= 2018 AFC Futsal Championship qualification =

Tournament details
- Host countries: Vietnam (ASEAN); Thailand (East and West); Iran (South & Central)
- Dates: 15 October – 12 November 2017
- Teams: 29 (from 1 confederation)

Tournament statistics
- Matches played: 44
- Goals scored: 391 (8.89 per match)
- Attendance: 19,982 (454 per match)
- Top scorer: (Myanmar) Pyae Phyo Maung I (11 goals)

The 2018 AFC Futsal Championship qualification was the qualification process organized by the Asian Football Confederation (AFC) to determine the participating teams for the 2018 AFC Futsal Championship, the 15th edition of the international men's futsal championship of Asia.

A total of 16 teams qualified to play in the final tournament, including Chinese Taipei who qualified automatically as hosts.

The qualification process was divided into four zones, where the ASEAN Zone doubled as the 2017 AFF Futsal Championship, the East Zone and West Zone was played in Thailand, and the South Zone was merged to Central Zone as Nepal was the only team from South Zone.

== Qualification process ==
Of the 47 AFC member associations, a total of 29 teams entered the competition. The 16 spots in the final tournament are distributed as follows:

- Host : 1 spot
- ASEAN Zone : 4 spots
- South & Central Zone : 4 spots (the two zones were merged since Nepal was the only team from South Zone)
- West Zone : 4 spots
- East Zone : 3 spots

As the final tournament hosts had not been announced at the time of the qualifying draw, the hosts Chinese Taipei were also included in the draw. Despite having automatically qualified for the final tournament, they may still decide to participate in qualification, and if they finish in one of the qualification spots, the next best team in their zone (East) advances to play-off.

== Draw ==
=== Seeding ===
East Zone ranking
Team	Final	Qual
Japan	7	1
China	10	2
Chinese Taipei	13	3
South Korea	—	4
Mongolia	—	5
Hong Kong	—	6
Macau	—	—

South & Central Zone ranking
Team	Final	Qual
Iran	1	1
Uzbekistan	2	2
Kyrgyzstan	6	3
Tajikistan	14	4
Afghanistan	—	5
Turkmenistan	—	6
Nepal	—	—

West Zone ranking
Team	Final	Qual
Iraq	8	1
Qatar	9	2
Lebanon	11	3
Saudi Arabia	12	4
Jordan	15	5
United Arab Emirates	—	6
Bahrain	—	7
Syria	—	—

ASEAN Zone ranking
Team	Final	Zone
Thailand	3	1
Myanmar	—	2
Malaysia	16	3
Timor-Leste	—	4
Indonesia	—	5
Brunei	—	5
Laos	—	5
Vietnam	4	—
Australia	5	—
Philippines	—	—

=== AFF Draw ===
The original draw for the 2017 AFF Futsal Championship was held on 17 February 2017, 10:00 MMT (UTC+06:30) during the AFF Council Meeting at the Novotel Yangon Max Hotel in Yangon, Myanmar. After Australia withdrew from the competition, a re-draw was held on 23 September 2017 during the AFF Council Meeting in Bali, Indonesia.

The teams were seeded according to their performance in the 2016 AFF Futsal Championship tournament.

Pot 1	Pot 2	Pot 3
1. **Vietnam** **(H)**; 2. **Thailand**	3. **Myanmar**; 4. **Malaysia**	Brunei; Indonesia; Laos; Philippines*; Timor-Leste*

Notes

- (*) Not vying for qualification but will still play matches.
- Teams in **bold** qualified for the final tournament.

=== AFC Draw ===
The draw was held on 6 July 2017, 15:00 MYT (UTC+8), at the AFC House in Kuala Lumpur, Malaysia, except for the ASEAN Zone which uses the 2017 AFF Futsal Championship as their qualification tournament and whose draw had already been held. The mechanism for each zone is as follows:

- East Zone : seven teams from East Asia, were drawn into one group of four teams and one group of three teams.
- South & Central Zone : seven teams from South Asia and Central Asia, were drawn into one group of four teams and one group of three teams.
- West Zone : eight teams from West Asia, were drawn into two groups of four teams.

The teams were seeded according to their performance in the 2016 AFC Futsal Championship final tournament and qualification.

	Pot 1	Pot 2	Pot 3	Pot 4
East Zone Host: Thailand	1. **Japan**; 2. **China**	3. **Chinese Taipei**; 4. **South Korea**	5. Mongolia; 6. Hong Kong; 7. Macau	
South & Central Zone Host: Iran	1. **Iran**; 2. **Uzbekistan**	3. **Kyrgyzstan**; 4. **Tajikistan**	5. Afghanistan; 6. Turkmenistan; 7. Nepal	
West Zone Host: Thailand	1. **Iraq**; 2. Qatar	3. **Lebanon**; 4. Saudi Arabia	5. **Jordan**	6. United Arab Emirates; 7. **Bahrain**; 8. Syria

Notes

- Teams in **bold** qualified for the final tournament.

Did not enter
ASEAN Zone	Australia (withdrew); Cambodia; Philippines (competing but not vying for qualification); Timor-Leste (competing but not vying for qualification)
East Zone	Guam; Northern Mariana Islands; North Korea
South & Central Zone	Bangladesh; Bhutan; India; Maldives; Pakistan; Sri Lanka
West Zone	Kuwait (suspended); Oman; Palestine; Yemen

== Format ==
In each group, teams play each other once at a centralised venue; except ASEAN Zone, South & Central Zone.

=== Tiebreakers ===
Teams are ranked according to points (3 points for a win, 1 point for a draw, 0 points for a loss), and if tied on points, the following tiebreaking criteria are applied, in the order given, to determine the rankings (Regulations Article 11.5):

1. Points in head-to-head matches among tied teams;
2. Goal difference in head-to-head matches among tied teams;
3. Goals scored in head-to-head matches among tied teams;
4. If more than two teams are tied, and after applying all head-to-head criteria above, a subset of teams are still tied, all head-to-head criteria above are reapplied exclusively to this subset of teams;
5. Goal difference in all group matches;
6. Goals scored in all group matches;
7. Penalty shoot-out if only two teams are tied and they met in the last round of the group;
8. Disciplinary points (yellow card = 1 point, red card as a result of two yellow cards = 3 points, direct red card = 3 points, yellow card followed by direct red card = 4 points);
9. Drawing of lots.

== ASEAN Zone ==
- The (AFC) matches were played between 26 October and 30 October 2017.
- All matches were held in Vietnam.
- Times listed are UTC+7.
- In the event the Philippines, Timor Leste or both finish among the top two teams in their group the next best team/s qualify for the final tournament instead since both countries did not submit their entries for the 2018 AFC Futsal Championship.

=== Group A ===
Pos	Team	Pld	W	D	L	GF	GA	GD	Pts	Qualification
1	Vietnam (H)	4	4	0	0	49	3	+46	12	Semi-finals and 2018 AFC Futsal Championship
2	Myanmar	4	3	0	1	41	5	+36	9	Semi-finals and 2018 AFC Futsal Championship
3	Indonesia	4	2	0	2	35	7	+28	6	
4	Brunei	4	1	0	3	5	40	−35	3	
5	Philippines (Note: Philippines are not eligible for AFC Futsal Championship qualification.)	4	0	0	4	0	75	−75	0	

Source: AFC & AFF
Rules for classification: Qualification tiebreakers
(H) Hosts
Notes:
26 October 2017
12:00

Brunei	0–13	Myanmar
	Report	Pyae Phyo Maung I 3', 14', 14', 28'; Sai Pyone Aung 7', 7'; Hlaing Min Tun 10'; Aung Aung 16', 38'; Aung Zin Oo 20'; Naing Ye Kyaw 27', 29'; Kyaw Kyaw Tun 36'

Phú Thọ Indoor Stadium, Ho Chi Minh City
Attendance: 50
Referee: Osama Saeed Idrees Sedaif (Bahrain)
26 October 2017
14:30

Indonesia	21–0	Philippines
Syauqi 4', 13', 32'; Ardiansyah 6', 31', 33', 33'; Nawawi 9', 18'; Saptaji 10', 37'; Subhan 20', 21', 30', 38'; Aditya 21'; Miranda 22' (o.g.); Mustamu 25', 40'; Suhendra 35'; Mushar 40'	Report

Phú Thọ Indoor Stadium, Ho Chi Minh City
Attendance: 75
Referee: Hasan Mousa Al-Gburi (Iraq)

27 October 2017
17:00

Indonesia	9–0	Brunei
Ardiansyah 3'; Ariwibowo 9'; Mustamu 12'; Syauqi 12', 30'; Saptaji 15', 27'; Iqbal 36'; Larawo 40'	Report

Phú Thọ Indoor Stadium, Ho Chi Minh City
Attendance: 100
Referee: Husein Khalaileh (Jordan)
27 October 2017
19:30

Philippines	0–24	Vietnam
	Report	Vũ Quốc Hưng 2', 3', 27', 37'; Nguyễn Minh Trí 4', 21'; Phùng Trọng Luân 6', 28', 38'; Trần Thái Huy 10', 20', 33', 34'; Phạm Đức Hòa 11', 36', 36'; Cổ Trí Kiệt 12'; Khổng Đình Hùng 16'; Ngô Ngọc Sơn 18', 28'; Lê Quốc Nam 24', 26'; Đinh Văn Toàn 27'; Trần Văn Vũ 40'

Phú Thọ Indoor Stadium, Ho Chi Minh City
Attendance: 3,000
Referee: Husain Ali Al-Bahhar (Bahrain)

28 October 2017
17:00

Myanmar	25–0	Philippines
Nyein Min Soe 1', 16', 34'; Pyae Phyo Maung I 2', 15', 24', 25', 34'; Naing Ye Kyaw 4'; Khin Zaw Lin 7', 18', 19'; Hein Min Soe 10', 36'; Myo Myint Soe 10', 37'; Hlaing Min Tun 12', 37'; Hermosa 16' (o.g.); Aung Zin Oo 18'; Pyae Phyo Maung II 19', 38'; Ko Ko Lwin 28', 38'; Aung Aung 31'	Report

Phú Thọ Indoor Stadium, Ho Chi Minh City
Attendance: 150
Referee: Hasan Mousa Al-Gburi (Iraq)
28 October 2017
19:30

Vietnam	4–3	Indonesia
Phùng Trọng Luân 7', 32', 36'; Nguyễn Minh Trí 40'	Report	Nawawi 12', 35' (pen.); Ardiansyah 34'

Phú Thọ Indoor Stadium, Ho Chi Minh City
Attendance: 2,900
Referee: Osama Saeed Idrees Sedaif (Bahrain)

29 October 2017
16:00

Myanmar	3–2	Indonesia
Pyae Phyo Maung I 3', 24'; Kyaw Soe Moe 35'	Report	Syauqi 8'; Saptaji 40'

Phú Thọ Indoor Stadium, Ho Chi Minh City
Attendance: 120
Referee: Husein Khalaileh (Jordan)
29 October 2017
19:00

Brunei	0–18	Vietnam
	Report	Ngô Ngọc Sơn 1', 10', 23', 30'; Vũ Quốc Hưng 3'; Đinh Văn Toàn 5'; Trần Thái Huy 5', 24', 26', 33'; Phùng Trọng Luân 9', 34', 39'; Lê Quốc Nam 12'; Vũ Xuân Du 23'; Danh Phát 25', 27', 39'

Phú Thọ Indoor Stadium, Ho Chi Minh City
Attendance: 2,000
Referee: Mohamad Chami (Lebanon)

30 October 2017
16:00

Philippines	0–5	Brunei
	Report	Maziri 7'; Naqib 24'; Faiz 28', 39'; Raimi 33'

Phú Thọ Indoor Stadium, Ho Chi Minh City
Attendance: 60
Referee: Vahid Arzpeyma Mohamareh (Iran)
30 October 2017
19:00

Vietnam	3–0	Myanmar
Phùng Trọng Luân 13'; Lê Quốc Nam 40'; Nguyễn Văn Huy 40'	Report

Phú Thọ Indoor Stadium, Ho Chi Minh City
Attendance: 3,000
Referee: Husain Ali Al-Bahhar (Bahrain)

=== Group B ===
Pos	Team	Pld	W	D	L	GF	GA	GD	Pts	Qualification
1	Thailand	3	3	0	0	37	5	+32	9	Semi-finals and 2018 AFC Futsal Championship
2	Malaysia	3	2	0	1	16	11	+5	6	Semi-finals and 2018 AFC Futsal Championship
3	Laos	3	1	0	2	9	24	−15	3	
4	Timor-Leste (Note: Timor-Leste are not eligible for AFC Futsal Championship qualification.)	3	0	0	3	8	30	−22	0	

Source: AFC & AFF
Rules for classification: Qualification tiebreakers
Notes:
26 October 2017
17:00

Thailand	14–0	Laos
Chaivit 1', 3'; Weerasak 4', 23'; Jetsada 4', 35'; Peerapol 5', 37'; Nawin 8'; Warut 12'; Osamanmusa 14', 23', 31'; Nattawut 35'	Report

Phú Thọ Indoor Stadium, Ho Chi Minh City
Attendance: 150
Referee: Mahmoudreza Nasirloo (Iran)
26 October 2017
19:30

Malaysia	7–2	Timor-Leste
Akmarul 2'; Haniffa 2', 18'; Awalluddin 19', 26'; Khairul 32'; Azwann 36'	Report	Gomes 8'; Nunes 31'

Phú Thọ Indoor Stadium, Ho Chi Minh City
Attendance: 80
Referee: Lee Po-fu (Chinese Taipei)

27 October 2017
12:00

Laos	3–6	Malaysia
Soulichanh 15', 30'; Nidnilanh 38'	Report	Khairul 2', 10', 27'; Akmarul 10'; Azri 12', 39'

Phú Thọ Indoor Stadium, Ho Chi Minh City
Attendance: 80
Referee: Mohamad Chami (Lebanon)
27 October 2017
14:30

Timor-Leste	2–17	Thailand
Gomes 8', 12'	Report	Peerapol 3', 4', 12'; Vong 5' (o.g.); Sorasak 6', 16'; Panut 9'; Jetsada 10', 19', 36'; Chaivit 12'; Osamanmusa 14', 15', 29', 30', 39'; Weerasak 22'

Phú Thọ Indoor Stadium, Ho Chi Minh City
Attendance: 200
Referee: Vahid Arzpeyma Mohamareh (Iran)

28 October 2017
12:00

Thailand	6–3	Malaysia
Osamanmusa 11', 15'; Ronnachai 12'; Nattawut 25'; Nawin 27'; Warut 30'	Report	Khairul 29', 32'; Azwann 34'

Phú Thọ Indoor Stadium, Ho Chi Minh City
Attendance: 150
Referee: Mahmoudreza Nasirloo (Iran)
28 October 2017
14:30

Timor-Leste	4–6	Laos
Gomes 8', 11'; Mu Kui Sen 14'; Duarte 34'	Report	Chanthaphone 2'; Khampha 11'; Phonephet 16'; Soulichanh 21', 40'; Nidnilanh 33'

Phú Thọ Indoor Stadium, Ho Chi Minh City
Attendance: 50
Referee: Lee Po-fu (Chinese Taipei)

=== Semi-finals ===
1 November 2017
16:00

Thailand	8–3	Myanmar
Nawin 13'; Osamanmusa 17', 28'; Nattawut 26', 27'; Peerapol 34'; Chaivit 36'; Weerasak 40'	Report	Pyae Phyo Maung I 21'; Nyein Min Soe 27'; Chaivit 40' (o.g.)

Phú Thọ Indoor Stadium, Ho Chi Minh City
Attendance: 800
Referee: Osama Saeed Idrees Sedaif (Bahrain)
1 November 2017
19:00

Vietnam	1–5	Malaysia
Ngô Ngọc Sơn 36'	Report	Khairul 10', 12'; Awalluddin 14'; Akmarul 15', 35'

Phú Thọ Indoor Stadium, Ho Chi Minh City
Attendance: 3,400
Referee: Mahmoudreza Nasirloo (Iran)

=== Third place match ===
3 November 2017
16:00

Vietnam	2–2	Myanmar
Phùng Trọng Luân 10'; Danh Phát 26'	Report	Kyaw Soe Moe 33'; Nyein Min Soe 36'
Penalties
Phạm Đức Hòa (penalty scored); Vũ Xuân Du (penalty scored); Nguyễn Minh Trí (penalty missed); Phùng Trọng Luân (penalty scored); Danh Phát (penalty missed)	3–4	(penalty scored) Pyae Phyo Maung I; (penalty missed) Pyae Phyo Maung II; (penalty scored) Kyaw Soe Moe; (penalty scored) Naing Ye Kyaw; (penalty scored) Aung Aung

Phú Thọ Indoor Stadium, Ho Chi Minh City
Attendance: 1,500
Referee: Vahid Arzpeyma Mohamareh (Iran)

=== Final ===
3 November 2017
19:00

Malaysia	3–4 (a.e.t.)	Thailand
Awalluddin 1'; Ridzwan 6'; Awaluddin 23'	Report	Tanachot 13'; Osamanmusa 27'; Jetsada 30'; Ronnachai 44'

Phú Thọ Indoor Stadium, Ho Chi Minh City
Attendance: 3,100
Referee: Husein Khalaileh (Jordan)

== East Zone ==
- The matches were played between 4 and 8 November 2017.
- All matches are held in Thailand.
- Times listed are UTC+7.

=== Group A ===
Pos	Team	Pld	W	D	L	GF	GA	GD	Pts	Qualification
1	Japan	3	3	0	0	24	2	+22	9	2018 AFC Futsal Championship
2	Chinese Taipei (Note: Chinese Taipei, as final tournament hosts, automatically qualified regardless of qualification results.)	3	2	0	1	13	10	+3	6	Play-off
3	Mongolia	3	1	0	2	9	13	−4	3	
4	Macau	3	0	0	3	2	23	−21	0	

Source: AFC
Rules for classification: Qualification tiebreakers
Notes:
4 November 2017
14:30

Japan	5–1	Mongolia
Shimizu 3', 11'; Nibuya 25'; Morioka 34'; Watanabe 37'	Report	Pagamsürengiin 29'

Bangkok Arena, Bangkok
Attendance: 100
Referee: Ryan Shepheard (Australia)
4 November 2017
17:00

Chinese Taipei	6–0	Macau
Chi Sheng-fa 16' (pen.); Lin Chih-hung 18', 20', 32', 40'; Chan Tsz Yeung 24' (o.g.)	Report

Bangkok Arena, Bangkok
Attendance: 30
Referee: Nurdin Bukuev (Kyrgyzstan)

5 November 2017
14:30

Mongolia	2–6	Chinese Taipei
Temuujin 23', 38'	Report	Chi Sheng-fa 6', 15', 30'; Huang Po-chun 7'; Lai Ming-hui 18', 30'

Bangkok Arena, Bangkok
Attendance: 55
Referee: Azat Hajypolatov (Turkmenistan)
5 November 2017
17:00

Macau	0–11	Japan
	Report	Shimizu 2', 3', 30'; Minamoto 16', 28'; Murota 22', 40'; Saito 23'; Hoshi 25'; Mayedonchi 29', 35'

Bangkok Arena, Bangkok
Attendance: 100
Referee: Yuttakon Maiket (Thailand)

6 November 2017
14:30

Japan	8–1	Chinese Taipei
Shimizu 3'; Hoshi 5', 13', 25'; Nibuya 6', 15'; Mayedonchi 32'; Yoshikawa 35'	Report	Huang Tai-hsiang 8'

Bangkok Arena, Bangkok
Attendance: 100
Referee: Anatoliy Rubakov (Uzbekistan)
6 November 2017
17:00

Macau	2–6	Mongolia
Kwok Siu Tin 19'; Cheong Loi 39'	Report	Munguntulga 3', 13'; Bat-Orgil 10', 11'; Purevdorj 12'; Pagamsuren 20'

Bangkok Arena, Bangkok
Attendance: 8
Referee: Kim Jong-hee (South Korea)

=== Group B ===
Pos	Team	Pld	W	D	L	GF	GA	GD	Pts	Qualification
1	South Korea	2	2	0	0	8	4	+4	6	2018 AFC Futsal Championship
2	China	2	1	0	1	7	5	+2	3	Play-off
3	Hong Kong	2	0	0	2	2	8	−6	0	

Source: AFC
Rules for classification: Qualification tiebreakers
4 November 2017
12:00

Hong Kong	0–5	China
	Report	Li Jianjia 17', 40'; Xu Yang 20'; Zeng Liang 23'; Peng Boyao 34'

Bangkok Arena, Bangkok
Attendance: 30
Referee: Trương Quốc Dũng (Vietnam)

5 November 2017
12:00

South Korea	3–2	Hong Kong
Shin Jong-hoon 18'; Chun Jin-woo 18'; Shin Ha-il 25'	Report	Liu Yik Shing 5'; Li Ka Chun 34'

Bangkok Arena, Bangkok
Attendance: 100
Referee: Mahmoudreza Nasirloo (Iran)

6 November 2017
12:00

China	2–5	South Korea
Zhuang Jianfa 16', 32'	Report	Kim Gyeong-geun 7'; Lee Sun-ho 25'; Shin Jong-hoon 30'; Kim Min-kuk 38', 40'

Bangkok Arena, Bangkok
Attendance: 30
Referee: Helday Idang (Malaysia)

=== Play-off ===
Winner qualified for 2018 AFC Futsal Championship.

8 November 2017
12:00

Chinese Taipei	2–2	China
Lin Chih-hung 3'; Hung Wei-teng 20'	Report	Zhao Liang 13'; Li Zhiheng 25'
Penalties
Chu Chia-wei (penalty missed); Chang Chien-ying (penalty scored); Huang Tai-hsiang (penalty scored)	2–3	(penalty scored) Zhang Yameng; (penalty scored) Zhao Liang; (penalty scored) Li Zhiheng

Bangkok Arena, Bangkok
Attendance: 50
Referee: Azat Hajypolatov (Turkmenistan)

== South & Central Zone ==
- The matches were played between 15 and 17 October 2017.
- All matches are held in Iran.
- Times listed are (IRST +3:30).

=== Group A ===
Pos	Team	Pld	W	D	L	GF	GA	GD	Pts	Qualification
1	Uzbekistan	3	3	0	0	22	6	+16	9	2018 AFC Futsal Championship
2	Kyrgyzstan	3	2	0	1	13	7	+6	6	2018 AFC Futsal Championship
3	Turkmenistan	3	1	0	2	14	12	+2	3	
4	Nepal	3	0	0	3	4	28	−24	0	

Source: AFC
Rules for classification: Qualification tiebreakers
15 October 2017
14:00

Uzbekistan	14–1	Nepal
D. Rakhmatov 2', 6', 22'; Abdumavlyanov 3'; Choriev 4', 24'; Abdurakhmonov 5'; Yunusov 13', 13'; A. Rakhmatov 26'; Nishonov 33'; Magar 35' (o.g.); Shavkatov 39', 40'	Report	Raut 22'

Shahid Poursharifi, Tabriz
Attendance: 200
Referee: An Ran (China)
15 October 2017
16:30

Kyrgyzstan	5–3	Turkmenistan
Zholdubaev 22', 40'; Baigazy Uulu 25'; Alimov 29'; Imanbekov 36'	Report	Alimov 3' (o.g.); Soltanow 11'; Annagulyýew 25'

Shahid Poursharifi, Tabriz
Attendance: 200
Referee: Tomohiro Kozaki (Japan)

16 October 2017
14:00

Nepal	0–5	Kyrgyzstan
	Report	Alimov 1'; Tashtanov 5', 37'; Baigazy Uulu 13'; Kanetov 21'

Shahid Poursharifi, Tabriz
Attendance: 100
Referee: Rey Ritaga (Philippines)
16 October 2017
16:30

Turkmenistan	2–4	Uzbekistan
Meredow 37'; Annagulyýew 38'	Report	Hamroev 12'; Yunusov 21'; Abdumavlyanov 24'; Choriev 27'

Shahid Poursharifi, Tabriz
Attendance: 100
Referee: Trương Quốc Dũng (Vietnam)

17 October 2017
14:00

Uzbekistan	4–3	Kyrgyzstan
Abdurakhmonov 4'; Sviridov 5'; Adilov 11'; Shavkatov 15'	Report	Kanetov 8', 35'; Anarbekov 15'

Shahid Poursharifi, Tabriz
Attendance: 85
Referee: Helday Idiang (Malaysia)
17 October 2017
16:30

Turkmenistan	9–3	Nepal
Magar 9' (o.g.); Soltanow 10', 21'; Kurbanow 11'; Annagulyýew 27'; Ataýew 28', 30'; Sähedow 33'; Muhammetmyradow 40'	Report	Lama 3'; Gurung 8'; Raut 14'

Shahid Poursharifi, Tabriz
Attendance: 200
Referee: Lee Po-fu (Chinese Taipei)

=== Group B ===
Pos	Team	Pld	W	D	L	GF	GA	GD	Pts	Qualification
1	Iran (H)	2	2	0	0	20	4	+16	6	2018 AFC Futsal Championship
2	Tajikistan	2	1	0	1	6	15	−9	3	2018 AFC Futsal Championship
3	Afghanistan	2	0	0	2	5	12	−7	0	

Source: AFC
Rules for classification: Qualification tiebreakers
(H) Hosts
15 October 2017
19:00

Afghanistan	2–8	Iran
Kazemi 8'; Khademi 21'	Report	Javid 2', 18', 28'; Hassanzadeh 5', 7', 29'; Talebi 15'; Abbasi 19'

Shahid Poursharifi, Tabriz
Attendance: 2,125
Referee: Mohamad Chami (Lebanon)

16 October 2017
19:00

Tajikistan	4–3	Afghanistan
Kazemi 3' (o.g.); Halimov 9'; Salomov 39'; Alimakhmadov 40'	Report	Haidari 9'; Rezayi 14'; Jafari 40'

Shahid Poursharifi, Tabriz
Attendance: 300
Referee: Liu Jianqiao (China)

17 October 2017
19:00

Iran	12–2	Tajikistan
Tavakoli 3', 4'; Orouji 6'; Alighadr 17', 18', 31'; Javid 18', 18'; Lotfi 19'; Talebi 30'; Abbasi 34'; Hassanzadeh 39'	Report	Sardorov 6'; Bekmurodov 39'

Shahid Poursharifi, Tabriz
Attendance: 3,254
Referee: Hiroyuki Kobayashi (Japan)

== West Zone ==
- The matches were played between 10 and 12 November 2017.
- All matches are held in Thailand.
- Times listed are UTC+7.

=== Group A ===
Pos	Team	Pld	W	D	L	GF	GA	GD	Pts	Qualification
1	Bahrain	3	2	1	0	8	4	+4	7	2018 AFC Futsal Championship
2	Iraq	3	1	1	1	9	8	+1	4	2018 AFC Futsal Championship
3	Saudi Arabia	3	0	3	0	7	7	0	3	
4	United Arab Emirates	3	0	1	2	2	7	−5	1	

Source: AFC
Rules for classification: Qualification tiebreakers
10 November 2017
14:30

Iraq	2–3	Bahrain
Khalid 7' (pen.); Dakheel 38'	Report	Saleh 2', 16', 40'

Bangkok Arena, Bangkok
Attendance: 92
Referee: Ryan Shepheard (Australia)
10 November 2017
17:00

Saudi Arabia	1–1	United Arab Emirates
Al-Asiri 4'	Report	Khalil 1'

Bangkok Arena, Bangkok
Attendance: 50
Referee: Anatoliy Rubakov (Uzbekistan)

11 November 2017
14:30

Bahrain	1–1	Saudi Arabia
Abbas 2'	Report	Mubarak 35'

Bangkok Arena, Bangkok
Attendance: 50
Referee: Trương Quốc Dũng (Vietnam)
11 November 2017
17:00

United Arab Emirates	0–2	Iraq
	Report	Jabbar 11'; Bachay 37'

Bangkok Arena, Bangkok
Attendance: 85
Referee: Mahmoudreza Nasirloo (Iran)

12 November 2017
14:30

Iraq	5–5	Saudi Arabia
Dakheel 1' (pen.); Al-Zubaidi 4'; Abdeen 6'; Riyadh 39'; Bachay 40'	Report	Jmah 1'; Al-Zahrani 11'; Al-Alouni 16', 35'; Mubarak 32'

Bangkok Arena, Bangkok
Attendance: 95
Referee: Nurdin Bukuev (Kyrgyzstan)
12 November 2017
17:00

United Arab Emirates	1–4	Bahrain
T. Abdulla 15'	Report	Abbas 17'; Obaid 23' (o.g.); Maula 38'; Mohamed 38'

Bangkok Arena, Bangkok
Attendance: 50
Referee: Azat Hajypolatov (Turkmenistan)

=== Group B ===
Pos	Team	Pld	W	D	L	GF	GA	GD	Pts	Qualification
1	Lebanon	2	2	0	0	6	2	+4	6	2018 AFC Futsal Championship
2	Jordan	2	1	0	1	4	4	0	3	2018 AFC Futsal Championship
3	Qatar	2	0	0	2	2	6	−4	0	
4	Syria	0	0	0	0	0	0	0	0	Withdrew

Source: AFC
Rules for classification: Qualification tiebreakers
10 November 2017
12:00

Jordan	3–1	Qatar
Samara 2'; Al-Deen 6', 37'	Report	Al-Bulushi 15'

Bangkok Arena, Bangkok
Attendance: 100
Referee: Yuttakon Maiket (Thailand)

11 November 2017
12:00

Lebanon	3–1	Jordan
Samara 6' (o.g.); Al-Ashran 15' (o.g.); El-Homsi 31'	Report	Samara 21'

Bangkok Arena, Bangkok
Attendance: 28
Referee: Azat Hajypolatov (Turkmenistan)

12 November 2017
12:00

Qatar	1–3	Lebanon
Al-Masoudi 40'	Report	Zeitoun 16', 40'; Kouyoumjian 31'

Bangkok Arena, Bangkok
Attendance: 100
Referee: Rey Ritaga (Philippines)

== Qualified teams ==
The following 16 teams qualified for the final tournament.

Team	Qualified as	Qualified on	Previous appearances in AFC Futsal Championship^{1}
Chinese Taipei	Hosts	29 July 2017	11 (2001, 2002, 2003, 2004, 2005, 2006, 2008, 2010, 2012, 2014, 2016)
Vietnam	ASEAN Zone Group A winners	29 October 2017	4 (2005, 2010, 2014, 2016)
Myanmar	ASEAN Zone Group A runners-up	29 October 2017	0 (debut)
Thailand	ASEAN Zone Group B winners	27 October 2017	14 (1999, 2000, 2001, 2002, 2003, 2004, 2005, 2006, 2007, 2008, 2010, 2012, 2014, 2016)
Malaysia	ASEAN Zone Group B runners-up	27 October 2017	11 (1999, 2001, 2002, 2003, 2004, 2005, 2006, 2007, 2008, 2014, 2016)
Japan	East Zone Group A winners	6 November 2017	14 (1999, 2000, 2001, 2002, 2003, 2004, 2005, **2006**, 2007, 2008, 2010, **2012**, **2014**, 2016)
South Korea	East Zone Group B winners	6 November 2017	12 (1999, 2000, 2001, 2002, 2003, 2004, 2005, 2007, 2008, 2010, 2012, 2014)
China	East Zone Play-off winners	8 November 2017	11 (2002, 2003, 2004, 2005, 2006, 2007, 2008, 2010, 2012, 2014, 2016)
Uzbekistan	South & Central Zone Group A winners	16 October 2017	14 (1999, 2000, 2001, 2002, 2003, 2004, 2005, 2006, 2007, 2008, 2010, 2012, 2014, 2016)
Kyrgyzstan	South & Central Zone Group A runners-up	16 October 2017	14 (1999, 2000, 2001, 2002, 2003, 2004, 2005, 2006, 2007, 2008, 2010, 2012, 2014, 2016)
Iran	South & Central Zone Group B winners	16 October 2017	14 (**1999**, **2000**, **2001**, **2002**, **2003**, **2004**, **2005**, 2006, **2007**, **2008**, **2010**, 2012, 2014, **2016**)
Tajikistan	South & Central Zone Group B runners-up	16 October 2017	9 (2001, 2005, 2006, 2007, 2008, 2010, 2012, 2014, 2016)
Bahrain	West Zone Group A winners	12 November 2017	1 (2002)
Iraq	West Zone Group A runners-up	12 November 2017	10 (2001, 2002, 2003, 2005, 2006, 2007, 2008, 2010, 2014, 2016)
Lebanon	West Zone Group B winners	12 November 2017	10 (2003, 2004, 2005, 2006, 2007, 2008, 2010, 2012, 2014, 2016)
Jordan	West Zone Group B runners-up	12 November 2017	1 (2016)

^{1} Bold indicates champions for that year. Italic indicates hosts for that year.

== Goalscorers ==
There were 391 goals scored in 44 matches, for an average of 8.89 goals per match.

11 goals

- (Myanmar) Pyae Phyo Maung I

10 goals

- (Thailand) Muhammad Osamanmusa
- (Vietnam) Phùng Trọng Luân

8 goals

- (Vietnam) Trần Thái Huy

6 goals

- (Indonesia) Ardiansyah
- (Indonesia) Syauqi Saud
- (Japan) Kazuya Shimizu
- (Malaysia) Khairul Effendy
- (Vietnam) Ngô Ngọc Sơn

5 goals

- (Chinese Taipei) Lin Chih-hung
- (Indonesia) Bayu Saptaji
- (Iran) Mahdi Javid
- (Thailand) Jetsada Chudech
- (Thailand) Peerapol Satsue
- (Timor-Leste) Bruno Gomes
- (Vietnam) Vũ Quốc Hưng

4 goals

- (Chinese Taipei) Chi Sheng-fa
- (Indonesia) Abdul Rohman Nawawi
- (Indonesia) Subhan Faidasa
- (Iran) Ali Asghar Hassanzadeh
- (Japan) Shota Hoshi
- (Laos) Soulichanh Phasawaeng
- (Vietnam) Lê Quốc Nam

3 goals

- (Bahrain) Jassam Saleh
- (Indonesia) Johanis Mustamu
- (Iran) Mehran Alighadr
- (Japan) Matías Hernán Mayedonchi
- (Japan) Kazuhiro Nibuya
- (Kyrgyzstan) Emil Kanetov
- (Myanmar) Aung Aung
- (Myanmar) Hlaing Min Tun
- (Myanmar) Khin Zaw Lin
- (Myanmar) Naing Ye Kyaw
- (Myanmar) Nyein Min Soe
- (Thailand) Chaivit Jamgrajang
- (Thailand) Weerasak Srichai
- (Turkmenistan) Mülkaman Annagulyýew
- (Turkmenistan) Maksat Soltanow
- (Uzbekistan) Davron Choriev
- (Uzbekistan) Dilshod Rakhmatov
- (Uzbekistan) Dilmurod Shavkatov
- (Uzbekistan) Artur Yunusov
- (Vietnam) Danh Phát
- (Vietnam) Nguyễn Minh Trí
- (Vietnam) Phạm Đức Hòa

2 goals

- (Bahrain) Falah Abbas
- (Brunei) Faiz Hasnan
- (China) Li Jianjia
- (China) Zhuang Jianfa
- (Chinese Taipei) Lai Ming-hui
- (Iran) Saeid Ahmad Abbasi
- (Iran) Shahab Talebi
- (Iran) Farhad Tavakoli
- (Iraq) Mustafa Bachay
- (Iraq) Hasan Dakheel
- (Japan) Akira Minamoto
- (Japan) Yuki Murota
- (Jordan) Samer Al-Deen
- (Jordan) Ahmad Samara
- (Kyrgyzstan) Maksat Alimov
- (Kyrgyzstan) Aktai Tashtanov
- (Kyrgyzstan) Ulanbek Baigazy Uulu
- (Kyrgyzstan) Mirlan Zholdubaev
- (Laos) Nidnilanh Chanchaleune
- (Lebanon) Hassan Zeitoun
- (Malaysia) Akmarul Nizam
- (Malaysia) Awalluddin Nawi
- (Malaysia) Azri Rahman
- (Malaysia) Azwann Ismail
- (Malaysia) Haniffa Hasan
- (Mongolia) Bat-Orgil Erdenebat
- (Mongolia) Munguntulga Battsagaan
- (Mongolia) Temuujin Altansukh
- (Myanmar) Aung Zin Oo
- (Myanmar) Hein Min Soe
- (Myanmar) Ko Ko Lwin
- (Myanmar) Myo Myint Soe
- (Myanmar) Pyae Phyo Maung II
- (Myanmar) Sai Pyone Aung
- (Nepal) Suraj Raut
- (Saudi Arabia) Abdulaziz Al-Alouni
- (Saudi Arabia) Aroan Mubarak
- (South Korea) Kim Min-kuk
- (South Korea) Shin Jong-hoon
- (Thailand) Nattawut Madyalan
- (Thailand) Sorasak Phoonjungreed
- (Thailand) Nawin Rattanawongswa
- (Thailand) Warut Wangsama-aeo
- (Turkmenistan) Watan Ataýew
- (Uzbekistan) Farkhod Abdumavlyanov
- (Uzbekistan) Davronjon Abdurakhmonov
- (Vietnam) Đinh Văn Toàn

1 goal

- (Afghanistan) Jawad Haidari
- (Afghanistan) Ali Jafari
- (Afghanistan) Akbar Kazemi
- (Afghanistan) Hussain Khademi
- (Afghanistan) Mohsen Rezayi
- (Bahrain) Sayed Mohamed
- (Bahrain) Salman Maula
- (Brunei) Raimi Karim
- (Brunei) Maziri Maidin
- (Brunei) Naqib Timbang
- (China) Li Zhiheng
- (China) Peng Boyao
- (China) Xu Yang
- (China) Zeng Liang
- (China) Zhao Liang
- (Chinese Taipei) Huang Po-chun
- (Chinese Taipei) Huang Tai-hsiang
- (Chinese Taipei) Hung Wei-teng
- (Hong Kong) Li Ka Chun
- (Hong Kong) Liu Yik Shing
- (Indonesia) Guntur Ariwibowo
- (Indonesia) Alexander Larawo
- (Indonesia) Randy Mushar
- (Indonesia) Aditya Rasyid
- (Indonesia) Iqbal Rahmatullah
- (Indonesia) Sunny Suhendra
- (Iran) Abolghasem Orouji
- (Iran) Touhid Lotfi
- (Iraq) Zainal Abdeen
- (Iraq) Hussein Al-Zubaidi
- (Iraq) Hassan Ali Jabbar
- (Iraq) Waleed Khalid
- (Iraq) Ghaith Riyadh
- (Japan) Kaoru Morioka
- (Japan) Koichi Saito
- (Japan) Tomoaki Watanabe
- (Japan) Tomoki Yoshikawa
- (Kyrgyzstan) Kelkel Anarbekov
- (Kyrgyzstan) Adilet Imanbekov
- (Laos) Khampha Phiphakkhavong
- (Laos) Phonephet Sihabouth
- (Laos) Chanthaphone Waenvongsoth
- (Lebanon) Ali El-Homsi
- (Lebanon) Serge Kouyoumjian
- (Macau) Cheong Loi
- (Macau) Kwok Siu Tin
- (Mongolia) Altantulga Pagamsuren
- (Mongolia) Pagamsürengiin Altantulga
- (Mongolia) Purevdorj Erdenebat
- (Myanmar) Kyaw Kyaw Tun
- (Myanmar) Kyaw Soe Moe
- (Nepal) Nirmal Gurung
- (Nepal) Nabin Lama
- (Qatar) Said Al-Bulushi
- (Qatar) Issa Al-Masoudi
- (Saudi Arabia) Moath Al-Asiri
- (Saudi Arabia) Jwher Jmah
- (Saudi Arabia) Mansour Al-Zahrani
- (South Korea) Chun Jin-woo
- (South Korea) Kim Gyeong-geun
- (South Korea) Lee Sun-ho
- (South Korea) Shin Ha-il
- (Tajikistan) Nekruz Alimakhmadov
- (Tajikistan) Firuz Bekmurodov
- (Tajikistan) Shavqat Halimov
- (Tajikistan) Dilshod Salomov
- (Tajikistan) Fayzali Sardorov
- (Thailand) Ronnachai Jungwongsuk
- (Thailand) Panat Kittipanuwong
- (Timor-Leste) Remigio Duarte
- (Timor-Leste) Mu Kui Sen
- (Timor-Leste) Ilidio Nunes
- (Turkmenistan) Allamyrat Kurbanow
- (Turkmenistan) Allaberdi Meredow
- (Turkmenistan) Öwezbaý Muhammetmyradow
- (Turkmenistan) Gurbangeldi Sähedow
- (United Arab Emirates) Tariq Abdulla
- (United Arab Emirates) Ahmed Khalil
- (Uzbekistan) Mashrab Adilov
- (Uzbekistan) Ilhomjon Hamroev
- (Uzbekistan) Khusniddin Nishonov
- (Uzbekistan) Anaskhon Rakhmatov
- (Uzbekistan) Konstantin Sviridov
- (Vietnam) Cổ Trí Kiệt
- (Vietnam) Khổng Đình Hùng
- (Vietnam) Nguyễn Văn Huy
- (Vietnam) Trần Văn Vũ
- (Vietnam) Vũ Xuân Du

1 own goal

- (Afghanistan) Akbar Kazemi (against Tajikistan)
- (Jordan) Ahmad Al-Ashran (against Lebanon)
- (Jordan) Ahmad Samara (against Lebanon)
- (Kyrgyzstan) Maksat Alimov (against Turkmenistan)
- (Macau) Chan Tsz Yeung (against Chinese Taipei)
- (Philippines) Lorenzo Hermosa (against Myanmar)
- (Philippines) Julian Pio Miranda (against Indonesia)
- (Timor-Leste) Andre Vong (against Thailand)
- (United Arab Emirates) Rashid Obaid (against Bahrain)

2 own goals

- (Nepal) Saurabh Magar (against Uzbekistan, Turkmenistan)
