= Kyrgyzstan national futsal team =

Kyrgyzstan
- Nickname(s): "Ак барстар" / "Ak Barstar" (The Snow Leopards)
- Association: Kyrgyz Football Union (KFU)
- Confederation: AFC (Asia)
- Head coach: Luis Bernat Molina
- FIFA code: KGZ
- FIFA ranking: 49 ▼6 (8 May 2026)
Home colours	Away colours

First international
- Singapore 5 – 9 Kyrgyzstan (Kuala Lumpur, Malaysia; 5 March 1999)

Biggest win
- Kyrgyzstan 14 – 0 Guam (Macau, Macau; 10 February 2006)

Biggest defeat
- Kyrgyzstan 0 – 21 Iran (Kuala Lumpur, Malaysia; 7 March 1999)

FIFA World Cup
- Appearances: 0

AMF World Cup
- Appearances: 1 (First in 2015)
- Best result: First Round (2015)

AFC Futsal Championship
- Appearances: 16 (First in 1999)
- Best result: (bronze) 3rd place (2005)

Asian Indoor and Martial Arts Games
- Appearances: 3 (First in 2005)
- Best result: Quarterfinals (2005)

The Kyrgyzstan national futsal team (Kyrgyz: Кыргызстан улуттук футзал курамасы, romanized: Keurgeuzstan Uluttuk Futsal Kuramaseu) represents Kyrgyzstan in international futsal competitions and is controlled by the Kyrgyz Football Union.

Kyrgyzstan has yet to participate in the FIFA Futsal World Cup. Their biggest attempt came in 2016 and 2024, when had some winnings to defending champion at that time Japan in AFC Futsal Asian Cup, but then lost both fifth-place matches.

== Competition records ==
=== FIFA Futsal World Cup ===
FIFA World Cup record
Year	Result	Position	Pld	W	D	L	GF	GA
(Netherlands) 1989	Part of Soviet Union							
(Hong Kong) 1992	Did not enter							
(Spain) 1996	Did not enter							
(Guatemala) 2000	Did not enter							
(Taiwan) 2004	Did not qualify							
(Brazil) 2008	Did not qualify							
(Thailand) 2012	Did not qualify							
(Colombia) 2016	Did not qualify							
(Lithuania) 2021	Did not qualify							
(Uzbekistan) 2024	Did not qualify							
2028	To be determined							
Total	0/10	0	0	0	0	0	0	0

=== Futsal at the Asian Indoor and Martial Arts Games ===
Asian Indoor and Martial Arts Games record
Year	Round	M	W	D	L	GF	GA	GD
(Thailand) 2005	Quarter-finals	3	2	0	1	12	7	+5
(Macau) 2007	Group stage	4	0	0	4	8	25	-17
(Vietnam) 2009	Did not enter							
(South Korea) 2013	Did not enter							
(Turkmenistan) 2017	Group stage	3	1	0	2	5	19	-14
Total	3/5	10	3	0	7	25	51	-26

=== AFC Futsal Asian Cup ===
Asian Cup record									Qualification							
Year	Result	M	W	D	L	GF	GA	GD	M	W	D	L	GF	GA	GD	Link
(Malaysia) 1999	Group Stage	4	1	1	2	18	45	−27	No qualification							
(Thailand) 2000	Group Stage	4	1	0	3	13	34	−21	No qualification							
(Iran) 2001	Group Stage	3	1	1	1	13	16	−3	No qualification							
(Indonesia) 2002	Quarter-finals	5	1	2	2	14	17	−3	No qualification							
(Iran) 2003	Quarter-finals	4	2	0	2	16	18	−2	No qualification							
(Macau) 2004	Group Stage	4	2	1	1	15	7	+8	No qualification							
(Vietnam) 2005	Third Place	7	5	0	2	23	12	+11	No qualification							
(Uzbekistan) 2006	Fourth Place	5	3	0	2	19	13	+6								
(Japan) 2007	Fourth Place	6	3	1	2	20	15	+5								
(Thailand) 2008	Quarter-finals	4	2	0	2	14	8	+6								
(Uzbekistan) 2010	Quarter-finals	4	1	1	2	10	14	−4								
(United Arab Emirates) 2012	Quarter-finals	4	2	0	2	5	5	0								
(Vietnam) 2014	Group Stage	3	1	1	1	6	7	−1	3	0	1	2	7	15	–8	
(Uzbekistan) 2016	Quarter-finals	6	2	1	3	15	20	−5	3	1	2	0	6	5	+1	
(Chinese Taipei) 2018	Group Stage	3	1	1	1	6	11	−5	3	2	0	1	13	7	+6	
(Turkmenistan) 2020	Cancelled								2	1	0	1	6	10	–4	
(Kuwait) 2022	Did not qualify								3	1	0	2	9	12	–3	
(Thailand) 2024	Quarter-finals	6	2	2	2	17	22	−5	3	2	0	1	15	17	–2	
2026	Group Stage	3	1	0	2	8	11	−3	3	3	0	0	14	4	+10	
Total:17/18	Third Place	75	31	12	32	232	275	−43	20	10	3	7	70	70	0	–

==== AFC Cup Results ====
AFC Futsal Asian Cup history
Year	Round	Opponent	Scores	Result	Venue
1999	Group stage	South Korea	2–2	Draw	Kuala Lumpur, Malaysia
1999	Group stage	Singapore	9–5	Won	Kuala Lumpur, Malaysia
1999	Group stage	Iran	0–21	Loss	Kuala Lumpur, Malaysia
1999	Group stage	Thailand	7–17	Loss	Kuala Lumpur, Malaysia
2000	Group stage	Macau	6–3	Won	Bangkok, Thailand
2000	Group stage	Uzbekistan	6–15	Loss	Bangkok, Thailand
2000	Group stage	Japan	0–6	Loss	Bangkok, Thailand
2000	Group stage	Iran	1–10	Loss	Bangkok, Thailand
2001	Group stage	Thailand	4–3	Won	Tehran, Iran
2001	Group stage	Iraq	5–5	Draw	Tehran, Iran
2001	Group stage	South Korea	4–8	Loss	Tehran, Iran
2002	Group stage	Kuwait	2–2	Draw	Jakarta, Indonesia
2002	Group stage	Japan	1–2	Loss	Jakarta, Indonesia
2002	Group stage	Indonesia	3–3	Draw	Jakarta, Indonesia
2002	Group stage	China	6–0	Won	Jakarta, Indonesia
2002	Quarter-finals	Iran	2–10	Loss	Jakarta, Indonesia
2003	Group stage	China	9–4	Won	Tehran, Iran
2003	Group stage	Iran	1–10	Loss	Tehran, Iran
2003	Group stage	Lebanon	5–2	Won	Tehran, Iran
2003	Quarter-finals	Thailand	1–2	Loss	Tehran, Iran
2004	Group stage	Philippines	5–0	Won	Macau, Macau
2004	Group stage	Macau	7–1	Won	Macau, Macau
2004	Group stage	Japan	1–4	Loss	Macau, Macau
2004	Group stage	Lebanon	2–2	Draw	Macau, Macau
2005	Preliminary round	Vietnam	4–1	Won	Ho Chi Minh, Vietnam
2005	Preliminary round	Iraq	2–0	Won	Ho Chi Minh, Vietnam
2005	Preliminary round	Hong Kong	5–0	Won	Ho Chi Minh, Vietnam
2005	Cup competition	Kuwait	4–1	Won	Ho Chi Minh, Vietnam
2005	Cup competition	Tajikistan	3–0	Won	Ho Chi Minh, Vietnam
2005	Cup competition	Uzbekistan	2–6	Loss	Ho Chi Minh, Vietnam
2005	Semi-finals	Japan	3–4	Loss	Ho Chi Minh, Vietnam
2006	Group stage	Australia	5–1	Won	Tashkent, Uzbekistan
2006	Group stage	Lebanon	7–3	Won	Tashkent, Uzbekistan
2006	Group stage	Kuwait	2–0	Won	Tashkent, Uzbekistan
2006	Semi-finals	Uzbekistan	2–4	Loss	Tashkent, Uzbekistan
2006	Third place	Iran	3–5	Loss	Tashkent, Uzbekistan
2007	Group stage	South Korea	4–3	Won	Amagasaki, Japan
2007	Group stage	Turkmenistan	7–1	Won	Amagasaki, Japan
2007	Group stage	Australia	3–3	Draw	Osaka, Japan
2007	Quarter-finals	Lebanon	3–2 (a.e.t.)	Won	Amagasaki, Japan
2007	Semi-finals	Japan	1–2	Loss	Osaka, Japan
2007	Third place	Uzbekistan	3–5	Loss	Osaka, Japan
2008	Group stage	Indonesia	5–1	Won	Bangkok, Thailand
2008	Group stage	Iraq	8–0	Won	Bangkok, Thailand
2008	Group stage	Thailand	1–3	Loss	Bangkok, Thailand
2008	Quarter-finals	Japan	0–4	Loss	Bangkok, Thailand
2010	Group stage	Thailand	2–4	Loss	Tashkent, Uzbekistan
2010	Group stage	Vietnam	4–2	Won	Tashkent, Uzbekistan
2010	Group stage	South Korea	4–4	Draw	Tashkent, Uzbekistan
2010	Quarter-finals	Japan	0–4	Loss	Tashkent, Uzbekistan
2012	Group stage	Thailand	0–2	Loss	Dubai, United Arab Emirates
2012	Group stage	United Arab Emirates	3–1	Won	Dubai, United Arab Emirates
2012	Group stage	Turkmenistan	2–1	Won	Dubai, United Arab Emirates
2012	Quarter-finals	Japan	0–1	Loss	Dubai, United Arab Emirates
2014	Group stage	Uzbekistan	2–2	Draw	Ho Chi Minh, Vietnam
2014	Group stage	South Korea	4–1	Won	Ho Chi Minh, Vietnam
2014	Group stage	Japan	0–4	Loss	Ho Chi Minh, Vietnam
2016	Group stage	Lebanon	4–4	Draw	Tashkent, Uzbekistan
2016	Group stage	Uzbekistan	1–2	Loss	Tashkent, Uzbekistan
2016	Group stage	Saudi Arabia	3–2	Won	Tashkent, Uzbekistan
2016	Quarter-finals	Iran	0–7	Loss	Tashkent, Uzbekistan
2016	Consolation semifinals	Japan	6–2	Won	Tashkent, Uzbekistan
2016	Fifth place	Australia	1–3	Loss	Tashkent, Uzbekistan
2018	Group stage	Lebanon	2–2	Draw	New Taipei City, Chinese Taipei
2018	Group stage	Jordan	3–1	Won	New Taipei City, Chinese Taipei
2018	Group stage	Thailand	1–8	Loss	Taipei, Chinese Taipei
2024	Group stage	Japan	3–2	Won	Bangkok, Thailand
2024	Group stage	Tajikistan	2–2	Draw	Bangkok, Thailand
2024	Group stage	South Korea	5–5	Draw	Bangkok, Thailand
2024	Quarter-finals	Iran	1–6	Loss	Bangkok, Thailand
2024	Play-offs 2	Vietnam	3–2	Won	Bangkok, Thailand
2024	Play-offs 3	Afghanistan	3–5	Loss	Bangkok, Thailand
2026	Group stage	Iraq	2–4	Loss	Jakarta, Indonesia
2026	Group stage	Indonesia	3–5	Loss	Jakarta, Indonesia
2026	Group stage	South Korea	3–2	Won	Jakarta, Indonesia

=== Tulpar Cup ===
- 2008: - (bronze) Third Place

=== Baltika Cup ===
- 2007 - (gold) Champions

=== ELF Cup ===
- 2006 - (bronze) Third Place

In 2006, Kyrgyzstan took part in the inaugural ELF Cup in Northern Cyprus. This competition was originally intended to be for teams that were not members of FIFA; however, the organisers extended invitations to both Kyrgyzstan and Tajikistan, who were both represented by their national futsal teams.

== Players ==
=== Current squad ===
The following 14 players are called up for the 2026 AFC Futsal Asian Cup qualification in Bishkek, Kyrgyzstan.

No.	Pos.	Player	Date of birth (age)	Caps	Goals	Club
1	GK	Ulan Chorobek uulu	1 August 2004 (age 22)			(Uzbekistan Football Association) Nasaf
2	GK	Bekbolot Akmataliev	13 November 1994 (age 31)			(Football Federation of Armenia) Unisport
3	DF	Donierbek Amanbaev	10 October 1997 (age 28)			(Uzbekistan Football Association) Nasaf
12	DF	Arkhat Medetbekov	28 April 2006 (age 20)			(Russian Football Union) MFK Sinara Yekaterinburg
5	DF	Erbol Doolotov	28 November 2007 (age 18)			(Football Federation of Armenia) Unisport
13	DF	Kairat Kubanychov (vice-captain)	16 June 1999 (age 27)			(Kyrgyz Football Union) Alay
7	MF	Shokhrukh Makhmadaminov (captain)	16 July 1998 (age 28)			(Football Federation of Belarus) MFC Stalitsa Minsk
10	MF	Muhammed Askarbekov	29 June 2001 (age 25)			(Russian Football Union) MFC «LKS»
11	MF	Islam Turatbekov	1 November 2005 (age 20)			(Kyrgyz Football Union) MFC Toyota
4	MF	Kanat Sadykov	4 July 2005 (age 21)			(Kyrgyz Football Union) Alay
6	MF	Semetey Murzakulov	27 December 2003 (age 22)			(Football Federation of Armenia) Unisport
9	FW	Maksat Alimov	3 August 1990 (age 35)			(Kyrgyz Football Union) Art Blast Group
8	FW	Denis Amandyk uulu	12 September 1999 (age 26)			(Kyrgyz Football Union) MFC Toyota
14	FW	Samat Zhanat uulu	11 September 2002 (age 23)			(Kyrgyz Football Union) Art Blast Group

== All-time record against opponents ==
Against	Played	Won	Drawn	Lost	GF	GA	GD
Afghanistan	3	1	1	1	13	10	+3
Australia	3	1	1	1	9	7	+2
China	3	2	0	1	16	7	+9
Chinese Taipei	2	2	0	0	7	2	+5
Guam	1	1	0	0	14	0	+14
Hong Kong	1	1	0	0	5	0	+5
Indonesia	4	1	1	2	13	12	+1
Iran	9	0	0	9	8	89	–81
Iraq	3	2	1	0	15	5	+10
Japan	10	1	0	9	11	32	–21
Jordan	1	0	0	1	1	7	–6
Kazakhstan	2	0	0	2	3	8	−5
Kuwait	3	2	1	0	8	3	+5
Lebanon	6	2	3	1	20	14	+6
Macau	2	2	0	0	13	4	+9
Nepal	1	1	0	0	5	0	+5
Philippines	1	1	0	0	5	0	+5
Qatar	1	1	0	0	5	2	+3
Saudi Arabia	2	1	0	1	8	14	–6
Singapore	1	1	0	0	9	5	+4
South Korea	5	2	2	1	18	18	0
Tahiti	1	1	0	0	4	2	+2
Tajikistan	5	4	0	1	20	16	+6
Thailand	7	1	0	6	18	38	−20
Turkmenistan	6	3	3	0	19	10	+9
United Arab Emirates	1	1	0	0	3	1	+2
Uzbekistan	15	1	2	12	34	68	−34
Vietnam	2	2	0	0	8	3	+5
Total	100	38	15	47	309	371	−62

== See also ==
- Kyrgyzstan women's national futsal team
