= AFC Futsal Asian Cup qualification (East Asia) =

The East Zone of the AFC Futsal Asian Cup Qualifiers is an international futsal competition contested between East Asian nations. It has been held as a qualifying competition for the AFC Futsal Asian Cup (AFC Futsal Championship) since 2009. The inaugural tournament was held by East Asian Football Federation.

== Results ==
Year	Host	Final			Third place match		
Year	Host	Winner	Score	Runner-up	3rd place	Score	4th place
2009; Details	China	China	5–4	Japan	Chinese Taipei	7–6	South Korea
2011; Details	Malaysia	China	5–3 (a.e.t.)	South Korea	Chinese Taipei	5–4	Hong Kong
2013; Details	Vietnam	China	Round-robin	Chinese Taipei	South Korea	Round-robin	Hong Kong
2015; Details	Mongolia	China	Round-robin	Chinese Taipei	South Korea	Round-robin	Mongolia
Year	Host	Group A winner	—	Group B winner	3rd place	Score	4th place
2017; Details	Thailand	Japan	Not held	South Korea	China	2–2 (3–2 p)	Chinese Taipei
2019; Details	China	China	Not held	Japan	South Korea	5–0	Mongolia
Year	Host	Winner	—	Runner-up	3rd place	—	4th place
2022; Details	Malaysia	Japan	Round-robin	South Korea	Chinese Taipei	Round-robin	Hong Kong

== Summary ==
Nation	Winners	Runners-up	Third place	Advances to finals (Note: Including automatical advances.)
China	5 (2009, 2011, 2013, 2015, 2019)	—	1 (2017)	6
Japan	3 (2017, 2019, 2022)	1 (2009)	—	7
South Korea	1 (2017)	2 (2011, 2022)	3 (2013, 2015, 2019)	6
Chinese Taipei	—	2 (2013, 2015)	3 (2009, 2011, 2022)	5

== All-time table ==
Nation	Part	Pld	W	D	L	GF	GA	GD	Win %	Pts
China	6	22	18	3	1	124	30	+94	81.82	57
Chinese Taipei	7	28	16	3	9	111	101	+10	57.14	51
South Korea	7	25	14	2	9	131	73	+58	56.00	44
Japan	4	14	13	0	1	119	18	+101	92.86	39
Hong Kong	7	26	5	2	19	70	123	−53	19.23	17
Mongolia	5	17	3	2	12	37	83	−46	17.65	11
Macau	5	16	1	0	15	28	129	−101	6.25	3
Guam	1	4	0	0	4	5	68	−63	0.00	0
