= 2010 AFC Futsal Championship qualification =

The 2010 AFC Futsal Championship qualification was held in late 2009 and early 2010 to determine 12 spots to the final tournament in Uzbekistan. The teams finishing first, second and third in the 2008 AFC Futsal Championship, and the host nation for the 2010 competition, receive automatic byes to Finals.

== System ==
Twenty-six teams registered in qualifying action for 12 places in the finals but Saudi Arabia and Brunei later withdrew, The teams have been divided into two qualifying groups in each zone. The top two teams from each group qualified for the crossover semifinals in their respective zones with only the top three going through to the Finals.

Reigning champions Iran, runners-up Thailand, Japan and 2010 edition hosts Uzbekistan have direct entry into the tournament proper. but Japan took part in the qualifiers because the East Asian Football Federation (EAFF) has designated the event as their official regional tournament.

== Qualified teams ==
Team	Qualified as	Qualification date	Appearance in finals
Thailand	2008 AFC Futsal Championship Runners-up	16 May 2008	11th
Iran	2008 AFC Futsal Championship Winners	16 May 2008	11th
Japan	2008 AFC Futsal Championship Third place and East Group Runners-up	18 May 2008	11th
Uzbekistan	Host	2 March 2009	11th
Iraq	West Group Runners-up	17 October 2009	8th
Lebanon	West Group Winners	17 October 2009	7th
Kuwait	West Group Third place	18 October 2009	9th
Kyrgyzstan	South & Central Group Winners	11 November 2009	11th
Turkmenistan	South & Central Group Third place	12 November 2009	5th
Tajikistan	South & Central Group Runners-up	12 November 2009	6th
China	East Group Winners	25 November 2009	8th
Chinese Taipei	East Group Third place	25 November 2009	8th
South Korea	East Group Fourth place	25 November 2009	10th
Indonesia	ASEAN Group Runners-up	24 February 2010	7th
Australia	ASEAN Group Winners	24 February 2010	4th
Vietnam	ASEAN Group Third place	25 February 2010	2nd

== Zones ==
=== ASEAN ===
==== Group stage ====
===== Group A =====
Team	Pld	W	D	L	GF	GA	GD	Pts
Australia	2	2	0	0	10	2	+8	6
Indonesia	2	1	0	1	8	5	+3	3
Myanmar	2	0	0	2	2	13	−11	0

20 February 2010
14:30

Australia	6–1	Myanmar
Giovenali 3', 12'; Rogić 10', 16'; Fogarty 19'; Fernando 32'	Report	Zaw Moe Naing 6'

Tennis Indoor Stadium, Jakarta
Attendance: 200
Referee: Rey Ritaga (Philippines)

21 February 2010
14:30

Myanmar	1–7	Indonesia
Han Naing Soe 38'	Report	Handoyo 5', 6'; Matulessy 19', 23'; Purba 28'; Karmadi 33'; Ohorella 34'

Tennis Indoor Stadium, Jakarta
Attendance: 1,200
Referee: Yasukazu Nobumoto (Japan)

22 February 2010
14:30

Australia	4–1	Indonesia
Seeto 5'; Keith 14'; Fernando 27'; Giovenali 37'	Report	Karismawan 9'

Tennis Indoor Stadium, Jakarta
Attendance: 1,200
Referee: Vadim Baratov (Turkmenistan)

===== Group B =====
Team	Pld	W	D	L	GF	GA	GD	Pts
Malaysia	3	2	1	0	19	4	+15	7
Vietnam	3	2	1	0	18	5	+13	7
Philippines	3	1	0	2	10	12	−2	3
Cambodia	3	0	0	3	7	33	−26	0

20 February 2010
16:15

Malaysia	4–1	Philippines
Mohamad 14'; Zainal 29'; Effendy 31'; Harif 33'	Report	Zerrudo 38'

Tennis Indoor Stadium, Jakarta
Attendance: 165
Referee: Scott Kidson (Australia)

20 February 2010
18:30

Vietnam	12–2	Cambodia
Trần Quang Duy 8', 39'; Nguyễn Quốc Bảo 11', 30'; Nguyễn Bảo Quân 11', 32'; Nguyễn Hoàng Giang 16', 39'; Nguyễn Trọng Thiện 18'; Phạm Minh Giang 29'; Nguyễn Đình Hoàng 32'; Nguyễn Quang Minh 33'	Report	Dor Vireak 18'; Ouk Sereyratanak 28'

Tennis Indoor Stadium, Jakarta
Attendance: 100
Referee: Nurdin Bukuev (Kyrgyzstan)

21 February 2010
16:15

Philippines	1–4	Vietnam
Bahadoran 40'	Report	Ngô Duy Khánh 6'; Zerrudo 27' (o.g.); Nguyễn Quốc Bảo 33'; Phạm Minh Giang 34'

Tennis Indoor Stadium, Jakarta
Attendance: 700
Referee: Kim Jang-kwan (South Korea)

21 February 2010
18:30

Cambodia	1–13	Malaysia
Ouk Sereyratanak 30'	Report	Kadir 3', 12', 31', 32'; Abdul Aziz 10', 18', 31'; Mohamad 25'; Harif 25', 27'; Noor 35', 38'; Karnim 39'

Tennis Indoor Stadium, Jakarta
Attendance: 240
Referee: Somsak Littiron (Thailand)

22 February 2010
16:15

Malaysia	2–2	Vietnam
Noor 31'; Effendy 33'	Report	Nguyễn Trọng Thiện 10'; Trương Quốc Tuấn 12'

Tennis Indoor Stadium, Jakarta
Attendance: 750
Referee: Hla Min (Myanmar)

22 February 2010
18:30

Cambodia	4–8	Philippines
Dor Vireak 8'; Soun Thorn 14'; Bahadoran 16' (o.g.); Be Put Sotha 31'	Report	Bahadoran 5', 6', 21', 24', 25', 39'; Mallari 9'; Zerrudo 29'

Tennis Indoor Stadium, Jakarta
Attendance: 120
Referee: Chen Kun-shan (Chinese Taipei)

==== Knockout stage ====
Semi-finals
February 24 – Jakarta
Malaysia	3
Indonesia	5
February 24 – Jakarta
Australia	4
Vietnam	1

Final
February 25 – Jakarta
Australia	3
Indonesia	0
Third place
February 25 – Jakarta
Malaysia	3
Vietnam (aet)	6

===== Semi-finals =====
24 February 2010
16:15

Malaysia	3–5	Indonesia
Karnim 18'; Harif 37'; Haris 39'	Report	Ladjanibi 28', 35' (pen.); Suryasaputra 33'; Purba 35'; Karmadi 39'

Tennis Indoor Stadium, Jakarta
Attendance: 2,000
Referee: Vadim Baratov (Turkmenistan)

24 February 2010
18:30

Australia	4–1	Vietnam
Fernando 16', 39'; Seeto 18', 31'	Report	Trương Quốc Tuấn 21'

Tennis Indoor Stadium, Jakarta
Attendance: 360
Referee: Siva Sangkaran Muniady (Malaysia)

===== Third place play-off =====
25 February 2010
16:15

Malaysia	3–6 (a.e.t.)	Vietnam
Kadir 12'; Zainal 14'; Effendy 24'	Report	Ngô Duy Khánh 5', 50', 50', 50'; Nguyễn Hoàng Giang 19', 40'

Tennis Indoor Stadium, Jakarta
Attendance: 450
Referee: Scott Kidson (Australia)

===== Final =====
25 February 2010
18:30

Indonesia	0–3	Australia
	Report	Seeto 7', 38'; Vizzari 21'

Tennis Indoor Stadium, Jakarta
Attendance: 1,010
Referee: Yasukazu Nobumoto (Japan)

=== East ===
==== Group stage ====
===== Group A =====
Team	Pld	W	D	L	GF	GA	GD	Pts
Japan	3	3	0	0	22	3	+19	9
Chinese Taipei	3	2	0	1	13	10	+3	6
Hong Kong	3	1	0	2	10	11	−1	3
Macau	3	0	0	3	7	28	−21	0

24 November 2009
14:00

Japan	10–1	Macau
Nagashima 1'; Minamoto 2', 30'; Kawamata 8', 15', 40'; Fujikawa 9'; Nibuya 18', 30'; Watanabe 35'	Report	Ho Wai Tong 26'

University of Technology Stadium, Beijing
Attendance: 50
Referee: Jemenico Porferio (Philippines)

24 November 2009
16:20

Chinese Taipei	2–1	Hong Kong
Lo Chih-en 31'; Lo Chih-an 35'	Report	Li Hang Wui 4'

University of Technology Stadium, Beijing
Attendance: 100
Referee: Ryan Shepheard (Australia)

25 November 2009
14:00

Macau	5–9	Chinese Taipei
Libano 4'; Kwok Siu Tin 6'; Ho Wai Tong 8'; Cheung 28'; Chan Man Hou 35'	Report	Fang Ching-jen 8', 27', 38', 38'; Wang Yong-lun 13'; Chang Fu-hsiang 24', 35'; Lo Chih-en 25'; Lee Meng-chian 37'

University of Technology Stadium, Beijing
Attendance: 100
Referee: Jemenico Porferio (Philippines)

25 November 2009
19:45

Hong Kong	0–8	Japan
	Report	Minamoto 2', 24'; Nagashima 5'; Nishitani 8'; Moriya 13'; Kawamata 13'; Sugawara 24', 36'

University of Technology Stadium, Beijing
Attendance: 100
Referee: Mei Ling (China)

26 November 2009
14:00

Japan	4–2	Chinese Taipei
Fujikawa 5', 24'; Kawamata 9'; Shinzo 27'	Report	Lee Meng-chian 11'; Fang Ching-jen 32'

University of Technology Stadium, Beijing
Attendance: 50
Referee: Kim Jang-kwan (South Korea)

26 November 2009
16:20

Hong Kong	9–1	Macau
Cheung Siu Wai 2', 13', 34'; So Loi Keung 3', 32'; Li Ling Fung 10'; Yau Kam Leung 26'; Chu Kwok Leung 31'; Li Hang Wui 33'	Report	Ho Wai Tong 23'

University of Technology Stadium, Beijing
Attendance: 100
Referee: Naoki Miyatani (Japan)

===== Group B =====
Team	Pld	W	D	L	GF	GA	GD	Pts
China	2	2	0	0	28	4	+24	6
South Korea	2	1	0	1	30	6	+24	3
Guam	2	0	0	2	1	49	−48	0

24 November 2009
19:45

Guam	0–23	China
	Report	Liang Shuang 2', 4', 21', 30'; Zhang Xi 5', 7'; Wang Wei 15', 17', 18', 27'; Huang He 15', 26'; Hu Jie 21'; Zhang Jiong 22', 31'; Zhang Xiao 22', 23', 31', 32', 37'; Li Xin 25', 27'; Xia Xun 32'

University of Technology Stadium, Beijing
Attendance: 3,000
Referee: Wong Yuen Chi (Hong Kong)

25 November 2009
16:20

South Korea	26–1	Guam
Shin Jong-hoon 1', 3', 11', 23', 32', 34', 37', 39'; Lee Jung-gyu 1', 21'; Ha Jin-won 9', 35'; Kim Doo-kyo 10'; Kim In-woo 11', 25', 25', 26', 31', 39'; Kim Min-kuk 12'; Kim Jong-man 16'; Jang Min-gyu 17', 39'; Kim Sun-ho 31', 37'; Kang Joo-hyeon 35'	Report	Cruz 39'

University of Technology Stadium, Beijing
Attendance: 100
Referee: Wong Yuen Chi (Hong Kong)

26 November 2009
19:45

China	5–4	South Korea
Wang Wei 9', 16'; Zhang Xi 16'; Zhang Xiao 17'; Li Xin 30'	Report	Shin Jong-hoon 1', 16'; Kim Doo-kyo 18'; Ha Jin-won 38'

University of Technology Stadium, Beijing
Attendance: 500
Referee: Yoichi Shibamura (Japan)

==== Classification ====
Team	Pld	W	D	L	GF	GA	GD	Pts
Hong Kong	2	2	0	0	20	3	+17	6
Macau	2	1	0	1	9	11	−2	3
Guam	2	0	0	2	4	19	−15	0

28 November 2009
14:00

Macau	8–2	Guam
Ho Wai Tong 17', 32'; Leong Chong In 18', 26', 39'; Bush 18' (o.g.); Kwok Siu Tin 21'; Libano 31'	Report	Cruz 8'; Laanan 24'

University of Technology Stadium, Beijing
Attendance: 20
Referee: Yoichi Shibamura (Japan)

29 November 2009
10:00

Hong Kong	11–2	Guam
So Sheung Kwai 3', 25'; Chu Kwok Leung 5'; Yau Kam Leung 8'; Li Ling Fung 13', 39'; So Loi Keung 15', 25'; Chan Man Chun 22', 29'; Cheung Siu Wai 30'	Report	Asoshina 22'; Spindel 31'

University of Technology Stadium, Beijing
Attendance: 50
Referee: Kim Jang-kwan (South Korea)

==== Knockout stage ====
Semi-finals
November 28 – Beijing
China	5
Chinese Taipei	1
November 28 – Beijing
Japan	6
South Korea	1

Final
November 29 – Beijing
China	5
Japan	4
Third place
November 29 – Beijing
Chinese Taipei	7
South Korea	6

===== Semi-finals =====
28 November 2009
16:30

China	5–1	Chinese Taipei
Zhang Xiao 4', 29'; Wang Wei 23'; Hu Jie 26', 27'	Report	Lo Chih-en 36'

University of Technology Stadium, Beijing
Attendance: 200
Referee: Naoki Miyatani (Japan)

28 November 2009
19:45

Japan	6–1	South Korea
Nagashima 12'; Watanabe 12', 21', 23'; Sato 19', 20'	Report	Jang Min-gyu 37'

University of Technology Stadium, Beijing
Attendance: 100
Referee: Jemenico Porferio (Philippines)

===== Third place play-off =====
29 November 2009
14:00

Chinese Taipei	7–6	South Korea
Hsieh Meng-hsuan 2', 27'; Chang Fu-hsiang 3'; Chang Han 18', 29'; Lee Meng-chian 21'; Feng Pao-hsing 29'	Report	Shin Jong-hoon 2', 34'; Kim Sun-ho 16', 33'; Jang Min-gyu 31'; Kang Woo-ram 31'

University of Technology Stadium, Beijing
Attendance: 100
Referee: Naoki Miyatani (Japan)

===== Final =====
29 November 2009
16:30

China	5–4	Japan
Zhang Xi 8', 29'; Li Xin 33', 37'; Hu Jie 38'	Report	Watanabe 2'; Nibuya 11'; Fujikawa 12'; Nagashima 39'

University of Technology Stadium, Beijing
Attendance: 1,500
Referee: Ryan Shepheard (Australia)

=== South & Central ===
Team	Pld	W	D	L	GF	GA	GD	Pts
Kyrgyzstan	3	2	1	0	13	7	+6	7
Tajikistan	3	2	0	1	19	8	+11	6
Turkmenistan	3	1	1	1	7	9	−2	4
Afghanistan	3	0	0	3	5	20	−15	0

10 November 2009
12:00

Kyrgyzstan	8–3	Afghanistan
Djetybaev 3'; Kadyrov 6', 21', 25'; Tilekeev 10'; Malinin 23'; Baitikov 28'; Abdurazakov 36'	Report	Tilekeev 9' (o.g.); Andar 12'; Hashemi 17'

Tan Binh Gymnasium, Ho Chi Minh City
Attendance: 60
Referee: Christopher Colley (Australia)

10 November 2009
14:30

Turkmenistan	3–7	Tajikistan
Resulov 8'; Muhamedmuradov 13'; Tagayev 31' (pen.)	Report	S. Jumaev 7', 18', 25', 30'; Vasiev 11'; Ulmasov 24'; Esenmamedov 34' (o.g.)

Tan Binh Gymnasium, Ho Chi Minh City
Attendance: 50
Referee: Alireza Rajabi (Iran)

11 November 2009
12:00

Afghanistan	0–2	Turkmenistan
	Report	Allaberdiyev 25'; Resulov 34'

Tan Binh Gymnasium, Ho Chi Minh City
Attendance: 70
Referee: Mei Ling (China)

11 November 2009
14:30

Tajikistan	2–3	Kyrgyzstan
Ulmasov 28'; Fatkhulloev 38'	Report	Kadyrov 10', 35'; Malinin 11'

Tan Binh Gymnasium, Ho Chi Minh City
Attendance: 70
Referee: Naoki Miyatani (Japan)

12 November 2009
12:00

Kyrgyzstan	2–2	Turkmenistan
Djetybaev 19'; Malinin 25'	Report	Atayev 15'; Chariyev 16'

Tan Binh Gymnasium, Ho Chi Minh City
Attendance: 40
Referee: Prasert Krutsri (Thailand)

12 November 2009
14:30

Tajikistan	10–2	Afghanistan
S. Jumaev 2', 35', 36'; Ulmasov 6', 24', 31'; Fatkhulloev 13', 19'; A. Jumaev 39'; Mamedbabaev 40'	Report	Nejrabi 20'; Hashemi 35'

Tan Binh Gymnasium, Ho Chi Minh City
Attendance: 45
Referee: Alireza Sohrabi (Iran)

=== West ===
==== Group stage ====
===== Group A =====
Team	Pld	W	D	L	GF	GA	GD	Pts
Lebanon	2	1	1	0	12	7	+5	4
Qatar	2	1	0	1	7	11	−4	3
Bahrain	2	0	1	1	7	8	−1	1

13 October 2009
19:15

Bahrain	4–4	Lebanon
Abbas 8'; S. Mohamed 12', 22'; A. Mohamed 18'	Report	Takaji 2', 24'; Atwi 32', 35'

Al-Gharafa Indoor Stadium, Doha
Attendance: 100
Referee: Mohammed Gheni (Iraq)

14 October 2009
19:15

Qatar	4–3	Bahrain
Gholam 12', 27'; Radhi 27' (o.g.); Yousuf 37'	Report	J. Mohamed 27'; Radhi 38'; A. Mohamed 40'

Al-Gharafa Indoor Stadium, Doha
Attendance: 300
Referee: Mohammad Al-Haddad (Kuwait)

15 October 2009
19:15

Lebanon	8–3	Qatar
Atwi 1', 33'; Takaji 3', 22', 25'; Kawsan 23'; El Homsi 34'; Said 40'	Report	Yousuf 13'; Murtada 15'; Eisa 25'

Al-Gharafa Indoor Stadium, Doha
Attendance: 300
Referee: Emad Shraim (Jordan)

===== Group B =====
Team	Pld	W	D	L	GF	GA	GD	Pts
Iraq	2	1	0	1	7	4	+3	3
Kuwait	2	1	0	1	3	3	0	3
Jordan	2	1	0	1	4	7	−3	3

13 October 2009
17:00

Jordan	2–6	Iraq
Al-Zuod 22'; Naji 34'	Report	Abu Al-Hail 2'; Mohsin 9', 37'; Khalid 17', 28'; Hanna 38'

Al-Gharafa Indoor Stadium, Doha
Attendance: 100
Referee: Nasser Al-Hmidi (Syria)

14 October 2009
17:00

Kuwait	1–2	Jordan
Al-Mekaimi 36'	Report	Arab 9'; Nasereddin 29'

Al-Gharafa Indoor Stadium, Doha
Attendance: 200
Referee: Ali Abdulla (Bahrain)

15 October 2009
17:00

Iraq	1–2	Kuwait
Khalid 10'	Report	Abu Al-Hail 27' (o.g.); Al-Mesned 27'

Al-Gharafa Indoor Stadium, Doha
Attendance: 200
Referee: Saad Al-Kathairi (Saudi Arabia)

==== Knockout stage ====
Semi-finals
October 17 – Doha
Lebanon	1
Kuwait	0
October 17 – Doha
Iraq	4
Qatar	0

Final
October 18 – Doha
Lebanon	3
Iraq	1
Third place
October 18 – Doha
Kuwait (aet)	13
Qatar	9

===== Semi-finals =====
17 October 2009
17:00

Iraq	4–0	Qatar
Saadi 26'; Khalid 32'; Bachay 34'; Mohsin 39'	Report

Al-Gharafa Indoor Stadium, Doha
Attendance: 500
Referee: Mohamad Chami (Lebanon)

17 October 2009
19:30

Lebanon	1–0	Kuwait
Fadel 36'	Report

Al-Gharafa Indoor Stadium, Doha
Attendance: 250
Referee: Emad Shraim (Jordan)

===== Third place play-off =====
18 October 2009
17:00

Kuwait	13–9 (a.e.t.)	Qatar
Al-Jaser 3', 17', 33', 36', 43'; Al-Asfour 9'; Al-Nakkas 20', 50'; Al-Mesned 23', 43'; Aman 42'; Al-Turaeji 47'; Al-Othman 49'	Report	Eisa 17', 49'; Khalid 23'; Raja 26', 26', 34'; Ebrahim 35'; Gholam 38', 41'

Al-Gharafa Indoor Stadium, Doha
Attendance: 350
Referee: Mohammed Gheni (Iraq)

===== Final =====
18 October 2009
19:30

Lebanon	3–1	Iraq
Atwi 29' (pen.); Kawsan 29'; Takaji 40'	Report	Bachay 28'

Al-Gharafa Indoor Stadium, Doha
Attendance: 500
Referee: Saad Al-Kathairi (Saudi Arabia)
