= 2005 AFC Futsal Championship =

Giải Bóng đá trong nhà vô địch Châu Á 2005

Tournament details
- Host country: Vietnam
- Dates: 22 May – 4 June
- Teams: 24 (from 1 confederation)
- Venues: 2 (in 1 host city)

Final positions
- Champions: Iran (7th title)
- Runners-up: Japan

Tournament statistics
- Matches played: 78
- Goals scored: 720 (9.23 per match)
- Top scorer: (Iran) Vahid Shamsaei (23 goals)
- Best player: (Japan) Kenichiro Kogure

The 2005 AFC Futsal Championship was held in Ho Chi Minh City, Vietnam from 22 May to 4 June 2005.

== Venues ==
Ho Chi Minh City
Phú Thọ Indoor Stadium	Army Zone Stadium
Capacity: 5,000	Capacity: 25,000

== Draw ==
Group A	Group B	Group C	Group D	Group E	Group F
Thailand; China; Maldives; Turkmenistan	Uzbekistan; Macau; Philippines; Palestine	Iran; Kuwait; Lebanon; Bhutan	South Korea; Chinese Taipei; Tajikistan; Qatar	Japan; Malaysia; Indonesia; Guam	Kyrgyzstan; Iraq; Hong Kong; Vietnam

== Preliminary round ==
=== Group A ===
Team	Pld	W	D	L	GF	GA	GD	Pts
Thailand	3	2	1	0	49	3	+46	7
China	3	2	1	0	37	2	+35	7
Turkmenistan	3	1	0	2	8	38	−30	3
Maldives	3	0	0	3	0	51	−51	0

23 May 2005
15:00

Thailand	23–2	Turkmenistan
	Report

Phú Thọ Indoor Stadium, Ho Chi Minh City
Referee: Badrul Hisham Kalam (Malaysia)

23 May 2005
17:00

China	21–0	Maldives
	Report

Phú Thọ Indoor Stadium, Ho Chi Minh City
Referee: Mohammad Al-Haddad (Kuwait)

24 May 2005
15:00

Turkmenistan	5–0	Maldives
	Report

Army Zone Stadium, Ho Chi Minh City
Referee: Nazrul Anuar Khairuddin (Malaysia)

24 May 2005
17:00

China	1–1	Thailand
	Report

Army Zone Stadium, Ho Chi Minh City
Referee: Manouchehr Nazari (Iran)

26 May 2005
15:00

Turkmenistan	1–15	China
	Report

Phú Thọ Indoor Stadium, Ho Chi Minh City
Referee: Badrul Hisham Kalam (Malaysia)

26 May 2005
15:00

Thailand	25–0	Maldives
	Report

Army Zone Stadium, Ho Chi Minh City
Referee: Manouchehr Nazari (Iran)

=== Group B ===
Team	Pld	W	D	L	GF	GA	GD	Pts
Uzbekistan	3	3	0	0	29	3	+26	9
Palestine	3	2	0	1	24	15	+9	6
Philippines	3	0	1	2	7	23	−16	1
Macau	3	0	1	2	5	24	−19	1

23 May 2005
19:00

Uzbekistan	7–1	Philippines
	Report

Phú Thọ Indoor Stadium, Ho Chi Minh City
Referee: Vadim Baratov (Turkmenistan)

23 May 2005
21:00

Palestine	9–2	Macau
	Report

Phú Thọ Indoor Stadium, Ho Chi Minh City
Referee: Tinawat Nantanimit (Thailand)

24 May 2005
19:00

Philippines	2–2	Macau
	Report

Army Zone Stadium, Ho Chi Minh City
Referee: Puji Suprayitno Dalil (Indonesia)

24 May 2005
21:00

Palestine	1–9	Uzbekistan
	Report

Army Zone Stadium, Ho Chi Minh City
Referee: Badrul Hisham Kalam (Malaysia)

26 May 2005
16:45

Philippines	4–14	Palestine
	Report

Phú Thọ Indoor Stadium, Ho Chi Minh City
Referee: Vadim Baratov (Turkmenistan)

26 May 2005
16:45

Uzbekistan	13–1	Macau
	Report

Army Zone Stadium, Ho Chi Minh City
Referee: Fusaya Suzuki (Japan)

=== Group C ===
Team	Pld	W	D	L	GF	GA	GD	Pts
Iran	3	3	0	0	38	5	+33	9
Kuwait	3	2	0	1	16	4	+12	6
Lebanon	3	1	0	2	19	15	+4	3
Bhutan	3	0	0	3	5	54	−49	0

23 May 2005
15:00

Iran	27–2	Bhutan
	Report

Army Zone Stadium, Ho Chi Minh City
Referee: Sayfiddin Amanov (Uzbekistan)

23 May 2005
17:00

Kuwait	3–2	Lebanon
	Report

Army Zone Stadium, Ho Chi Minh City
Referee: Kazuya Isokawa (Japan)

25 May 2005
15:00

Bhutan	2–14	Lebanon
	Report

Phú Thọ Indoor Stadium, Ho Chi Minh City
Referee: Ali Sabah (Iraq)

25 May 2005
17:00

Kuwait	0–1	Iran
	Report

Phú Thọ Indoor Stadium, Ho Chi Minh City
Referee: Sayfiddin Amanov (Uzbekistan)

26 May 2005
18:30

Bhutan	1–13	Kuwait
	Report

Army Zone Stadium, Ho Chi Minh City
Referee: Tinawat Nantanimit (Thailand)

26 May 2005
18:30

Iran	10–3	Lebanon
	Report

Phú Thọ Indoor Stadium, Ho Chi Minh City
Referee: Nazrul Anuar Khairuddin (Malaysia)

=== Group D ===
Team	Pld	W	D	L	GF	GA	GD	Pts
Tajikistan	3	3	0	0	19	11	+8	9
Chinese Taipei	3	2	0	1	14	7	+7	6
South Korea	3	1	0	2	14	13	+1	3
Qatar	3	0	0	3	8	24	−16	0

23 May 2005
19:00

South Korea	7–3	Qatar
	Report

Army Zone Stadium, Ho Chi Minh City
Referee: Nazrul Anuar Khairuddin (Malaysia)

23 May 2005
21:00

Chinese Taipei	2–4	Tajikistan
	Report

Army Zone Stadium, Ho Chi Minh City
Referee: Ali Sabah (Iraq)

25 May 2005
19:00

Qatar	3–7	Tajikistan
	Report

Phú Thọ Indoor Stadium, Ho Chi Minh City
Referee: Mohammad Al-Haddad (Kuwait)

25 May 2005
21:00

Chinese Taipei	2–1	South Korea
	Report

Phú Thọ Indoor Stadium, Ho Chi Minh City
Referee: Tinawat Nantanimit (Thailand)

26 May 2005
20:15

Qatar	2–10	Chinese Taipei
	Report

Army Zone Stadium, Ho Chi Minh City
Referee: Abdolvahed Beit-Sayyah (Iran)

26 May 2005
20:15

South Korea	6–8	Tajikistan
	Report

Phú Thọ Indoor Stadium, Ho Chi Minh City
Referee: Adel Al-Shatti (Kuwait)

=== Group E ===
Team	Pld	W	D	L	GF	GA	GD	Pts
Japan	3	3	0	0	32	0	+32	9
Indonesia	3	2	0	1	17	10	+7	6
Malaysia	3	1	0	2	11	9	+2	3
Guam	3	0	0	3	2	43	−41	0

22 May 2005
16:00

Japan	18–0	Guam
	Report

Army Zone Stadium, Ho Chi Minh City
Referee: Fusaya Suzuki (Japan)

22 May 2005
18:00

Malaysia	1–2	Indonesia
	Report

Army Zone Stadium, Ho Chi Minh City
Referee: Manouchehr Nazari (Iran)

24 May 2005
15:00

Guam	2–15	Indonesia
	Report

Phú Thọ Indoor Stadium, Ho Chi Minh City
Referee: Kim Jang-kwan (South Korea)

24 May 2005
17:00

Malaysia	0–7	Japan
	Report

Phú Thọ Indoor Stadium, Ho Chi Minh City
Referee: Abdolvahed Beit-Sayyah (Iran)

25 May 2005
15:00

Guam	0–10	Malaysia
	Report

Army Zone Stadium, Ho Chi Minh City
Referee: Vadim Baratov (Turkmenistan)

25 May 2005
17:00

Japan	7–0	Indonesia
	Report

Army Zone Stadium, Ho Chi Minh City
Referee: Jeffrey Goh (Singapore)

=== Group F ===
Team	Pld	W	D	L	GF	GA	GD	Pts
Kyrgyzstan	3	3	0	0	11	1	+10	9
Iraq	3	2	0	1	13	5	+8	6
Hong Kong	3	0	1	2	3	11	−8	1
Vietnam	3	0	1	2	3	13	−10	1

22 May 2005
16:00

Kyrgyzstan	4–1	Vietnam
	Report

Phú Thọ Indoor Stadium, Ho Chi Minh City
Referee: Adel Al-Shatti (Kuwait)

22 May 2005
18:00

Iraq	5–2	Hong Kong
	Report

Phú Thọ Indoor Stadium, Ho Chi Minh City
Referee: Fusaya Suzuki (Japan)

24 May 2005
19:00

Vietnam	1–1	Hong Kong
	Report

Phú Thọ Indoor Stadium, Ho Chi Minh City
Referee: Li Zhizhong (China)

24 May 2005
21:00

Iraq	0–2	Kyrgyzstan
	Report

Phú Thọ Indoor Stadium, Ho Chi Minh City
Referee: Fusaya Suzuki (Japan)

25 May 2005
19:00

Vietnam	1–8	Iraq
	Report

Army Zone Stadium, Ho Chi Minh City
Referee: Kazuya Isokawa (Japan)

25 May 2005
21:00

Kyrgyzstan	5–0	Hong Kong
	Report

Army Zone Stadium, Ho Chi Minh City
Referee: Adel Al-Shatti (Kuwait)

=== Second placed teams ===
Team	Pld	W	D	L	GF	GA	GD	Pts
China	3	2	1	0	37	2	+35	7
Kuwait	3	2	0	1	16	4	+12	6
Palestine	3	2	0	1	24	15	+9	6
Iraq	3	2	0	1	13	5	+8	6
Indonesia	3	2	0	1	17	10	+7	6
Chinese Taipei	3	2	0	1	14	7	+7	6

== Plate competition ==
=== Second round ===
==== Group I ====
Team	Pld	W	D	L	GF	GA	GD	Pts
Palestine	3	3	0	0	34	8	+26	9
Turkmenistan	3	2	0	1	20	15	+5	6
Qatar	3	1	0	2	24	24	0	3
Guam	3	0	0	3	5	36	−31	0

28 May 2005
18:30

Palestine	14–0	Guam
	Report

Phú Thọ Indoor Stadium, Ho Chi Minh City
Referee: Vadim Baratov (Turkmenistan)

28 May 2005
21:15

Turkmenistan	8–6	Qatar
	Report

Phú Thọ Indoor Stadium, Ho Chi Minh City
Referee: Ali Sabah (Iraq)

30 May 2005
15:00

Guam	4–14	Qatar
	Report

Phú Thọ Indoor Stadium, Ho Chi Minh City
Referee: Fusaya Suzuki (Japan)

30 May 2005
16:45

Turkmenistan	4–8	Palestine
	Report

Phú Thọ Indoor Stadium, Ho Chi Minh City
Referee: Mohammad Al-Haddad (Kuwait)

31 May 2005
18:30

Guam	1–8	Turkmenistan
	Report

Phú Thọ Indoor Stadium, Ho Chi Minh City
Referee: Kazuya Isokawa (Japan)

31 May 2005
20:15

Palestine	12–4	Qatar
	Report

Army Zone Stadium, Ho Chi Minh City
Referee: Abdolvahed Beit-Sayyah (Iran)

==== Group J ====
Team	Pld	W	D	L	GF	GA	GD	Pts
Iraq	3	3	0	0	14	5	+9	9
Vietnam	3	2	0	1	10	6	+4	6
Philippines	3	1	0	2	6	8	−2	3
Bhutan	3	0	0	3	8	19	−11	0

28 May 2005
18:30

Iraq	1–0	Vietnam
	Report

Army Zone Stadium, Ho Chi Minh City
Referee: Fusaya Suzuki (Japan)

28 May 2005
21:15

Philippines	3–1	Bhutan
	Report

Army Zone Stadium, Ho Chi Minh City
Referee: Abdolvahed Beit-Sayyah (Iran)

30 May 2005
15:00

Vietnam	6–3	Bhutan
	Report

Army Zone Stadium, Ho Chi Minh City
Referee: Badrul Hisham Kalam (Malaysia)

30 May 2005
16:45

Philippines	1–3	Iraq
	Report

Army Zone Stadium, Ho Chi Minh City
Referee: Jeffrey Goh (Singapore)

31 May 2005
18:30

Vietnam	4–2	Philippines
	Report

Phú Thọ Indoor Stadium, Ho Chi Minh City
Referee: Mohammad Al-Haddad (Kuwait)

31 May 2005
20:15

Iraq	10–4	Bhutan
	Report

Army Zone Stadium, Ho Chi Minh City
Referee: Manouchehr Nazari (Iran)

==== Group K ====
Team	Pld	W	D	L	GF	GA	GD	Pts
Lebanon	3	3	0	0	20	5	+15	9
Indonesia	3	1	1	1	16	10	+6	4
Malaysia	3	1	1	1	14	9	+5	4
Macau	3	0	0	3	2	28	−26	0

29 May 2005
18:30

Indonesia	9–1	Macau
	Report

Phú Thọ Indoor Stadium, Ho Chi Minh City
Referee: Nazrul Anuar Khairuddin (Malaysia)

29 May 2005
21:15

Lebanon	5–1	Malaysia
	Report

Phú Thọ Indoor Stadium, Ho Chi Minh City
Referee: Kazuya Isokawa (Japan)

30 May 2005
18:30

Macau	0–9	Malaysia
	Report

Phú Thọ Indoor Stadium, Ho Chi Minh City
Referee: Fusaya Suzuki (Japan)

30 May 2005
21:15

Lebanon	5–3	Indonesia
	Report

Phú Thọ Indoor Stadium, Ho Chi Minh City
Referee: Manouchehr Nazari (Iran)

1 June 2005
15:00

Macau	1–10	Lebanon
	Report

Phú Thọ Indoor Stadium, Ho Chi Minh City
Referee: Vadim Baratov (Turkmenistan)

1 June 2005
16:45

Indonesia	4–4	Malaysia
	Report

Phú Thọ Indoor Stadium, Ho Chi Minh City
Referee: Kazuya Isokawa (Japan)

==== Group L ====
Team	Pld	W	D	L	GF	GA	GD	Pts
Hong Kong	3	3	0	0	11	3	+8	9
Chinese Taipei	3	2	0	1	8	5	+3	6
South Korea	3	1	0	2	18	11	+7	3
Maldives	3	0	0	3	5	23	−18	0

29 May 2005
18:30

Chinese Taipei	4–1	Maldives
	Report

Army Zone Stadium, Ho Chi Minh City
Referee: Jeffrey Goh (Singapore)

29 May 2005
21:15

South Korea	2–4	Hong Kong
	Report

Army Zone Stadium, Ho Chi Minh City
Referee: Tinawat Nantanimit (Thailand)

30 May 2005
18:30

Maldives	1–6	Hong Kong
	Report

Army Zone Stadium, Ho Chi Minh City
Referee: Vadim Baratov (Turkmenistan)

30 May 2005
21:15

South Korea	3–4	Chinese Taipei
	Report

Army Zone Stadium, Ho Chi Minh City
Referee: Nazrul Anuar Khairuddin (Malaysia)

1 June 2005
18:30

Maldives	3–13	South Korea
	Report

Phú Thọ Indoor Stadium, Ho Chi Minh City
Referee: Mohammad Al-Haddad (Kuwait)

1 June 2005
20:15

Chinese Taipei	0–1	Hong Kong
	Report

Phú Thọ Indoor Stadium, Ho Chi Minh City
Referee: Fusaya Suzuki (Japan)

=== Knockout stage ===
Semi-finals
June 3 – Ho Chi Minh City
Palestine	3
Lebanon	6
June 3 – Ho Chi Minh City
Iraq	4
Hong Kong	3

Final
June 4 – Ho Chi Minh City
Lebanon	6
Iraq	2

==== Semi-finals ====
3 June 2005
16:00

Palestine	3–6	Lebanon
	Report

Phú Thọ Indoor Stadium, Ho Chi Minh City
Referee: Manouchehr Nazari (Iran)

3 June 2005
18:00

Iraq	4–3	Hong Kong
	Report

Phú Thọ Indoor Stadium, Ho Chi Minh City
Referee: Kazuya Isokawa (Japan)

==== Final ====
4 June 2005
14:30

Lebanon	6–2	Iraq
Takaji; Said; Itani; Abou-Chaaya; Atwi	Report	Ghazi; Shamil

Phú Thọ Indoor Stadium, Ho Chi Minh City
Referee: Fusaya Suzuki (Japan)

== Cup Competition ==
=== Second Round ===
==== Group G ====
Team	Pld	W	D	L	GF	GA	GD	Pts
Japan	3	3	0	0	12	4	+8	9
Iran	3	1	1	1	14	9	+5	4
Thailand	3	1	1	1	8	9	−1	4
China	3	0	0	3	6	18	−12	0

28 May 2005
13:15

Thailand	3–2	China
Munjarern 20'; Janta 33', 34'	Report	Yan Fei 19'; Zhang Xi 36'

Phú Thọ Indoor Stadium, Ho Chi Minh City
Referee: Adel Al-Shatti (Kuwait)

28 May 2005
13:15

Iran	1–3	Japan
Soltani 38'	Report	Kogure 25', 29'; Fujii 35'

Phú Thọ Indoor Stadium, Ho Chi Minh City
Referee: Kim Jang-kwan (South Korea)

29 May 2005
15:00

China	1–5	Japan
Wang Xiaoyu 21'	Report	Ono 7'; Suzumura 20'; Fujii 25'; Kogure 28'; Kanayama 31'

Phú Thọ Indoor Stadium, Ho Chi Minh City
Referee: Badrul Hisham Kalam (Malaysia)

29 May 2005
16:45

Iran	3–3	Thailand
Zareei 14'; Shamsaei 34'; Hashemzadeh 37'	Report	Janta 2', 26'; Piemkum 3'

Phú Thọ Indoor Stadium, Ho Chi Minh City
Referee: Adel Al-Shatti (Kuwait)

31 May 2005
15:00

China	3–10	Iran
Zhang Jiong 22'; Li Jian 35'; Yan Fei 40'	Report	Zareei 3', 7', 15'; Soltani 12', 40'; Hashemian 13'; Shamsaei 20', 24'; Heidarian 23'; Hashemzadeh 29'

Phú Thọ Indoor Stadium, Ho Chi Minh City
Referee: Sayfiddin Amanov (Uzbekistan)

31 May 2005
16:45

Thailand	2–4	Japan
Janta 35'; Munjarern 40'	Report	Suzumura 1'; Kogure 16', 40'; Ono 40'

Army Zone Stadium, Ho Chi Minh City
Referee: Badrul Hisham Kalam (Malaysia)

==== Group H ====
Team	Pld	W	D	L	GF	GA	GD	Pts
Uzbekistan	3	3	0	0	17	5	+12	9
Kyrgyzstan	3	2	0	1	9	7	+2	6
Kuwait	3	1	0	2	11	15	−4	3
Tajikistan	3	0	0	3	6	16	−10	0

29 May 2005
15:00

Kuwait	1–4	Kyrgyzstan
Al-Nakkas	Report	Kenjisariev; Abdyraimov; Duvanaev

Army Zone Stadium, Ho Chi Minh City
Referee: Kim Jang-kwan (South Korea)

29 May 2005
16:45

Tajikistan	1–5	Uzbekistan
Nasikhov	Report	Kudratov; Korolev; Ahmedov; Zakirov

Army Zone Stadium, Ho Chi Minh City
Referee: Manouchehr Nazari (Iran)

30 May 2005
13:15

Uzbekistan	6–2	Kuwait
Ahmedov 3'; Odushev 16'; Sharafutdinov 18'; Mamedov 31'; Korolev 39', 40'	Report	Al-Mass 36'; Khalf 38'

Army Zone Stadium, Ho Chi Minh City
Referee: Kazuya Isokawa (Japan)

30 May 2005
13:15

Tajikistan	0–3	Kyrgyzstan
	Report	Pestryakov 21'; Abdyraimov 23'; Kenjisariev 24'

Phú Thọ Indoor Stadium, Ho Chi Minh City
Referee: Tinawat Nantanimit (Thailand)

31 May 2005
15:00

Kuwait	8–5	Tajikistan
Al-Otaibi 6', 23', 30'; Al-Asfour 9', 15', 35'; Khalf 18'; Al-Naqi 20'	Report	Khojaev 5', 14'; Makhmudov 6'; Ulmasov 11'; Davlatbekov 19'

Phú Thọ Indoor Stadium, Ho Chi Minh City
Referee: Tinawat Nantanimit (Thailand)

31 May 2005
16:45

Uzbekistan	6–2	Kyrgyzstan
Ahmedov 2'; Mamedov 18'; Buriev 25', 37'; Odushev 29', 39'	Report	Sardarov 34'; Abdyraimov 36'

Army Zone Stadium, Ho Chi Minh City
Referee: Adel Al-Shatti (Kuwait)

=== Knockout stage ===
Semi-finals
June 2 – Ho Chi Minh City
Japan	4
Kyrgyzstan	3
June 2 – Ho Chi Minh City
Uzbekistan	1
Iran	4

Final
June 4 – Ho Chi Minh City
Japan	0
Iran	2

==== Semifinal ====
2 June 2005
16:00

Japan	4–3	Kyrgyzstan
Takahashi 20'; Kogure 21', 23'; Suzumura 27'	Report	Djetybaev 5', 13', 19'

Phú Thọ Indoor Stadium, Ho Chi Minh City
Referee: Adel Al-Shatti (Kuwait)

2 June 2005
18:00

Uzbekistan	1–4	Iran
Korolev 36'	Report	Raeisi 3'; Hashemzadeh 8'; Shamsaei 13', 15'

Phú Thọ Indoor Stadium, Ho Chi Minh City
Referee: Kim Jang-kwan (South Korea)

==== Final ====
4 June 2005
16:00

Japan	0–2	Iran
	Report	Shamsaei 3'; Zareei 8'

Phú Thọ Indoor Stadium, Ho Chi Minh City
Referee: Badrul Hisham Kalam (Malaysia)

== Awards ==
AFC Futsal Championship 2005 winners

Iran
7th title

Reza Nasseri, Amin Hashemian, Morteza Azimaei, Mohsen Zareei, Mohammad Hashemzadeh, Hossein Soltani, Mostafa Imanvand, Majid Raeisi, Vahid Shamsaei, Mohammad Reza Heidarian, Majid Tikdarinejad, Hamid Reza Abrarinia, Mohammad Taheri, Javad Maheri
Coach: (Brazil) Jurandir Dutra

- Most Valuable Player
  - (Japan) Kenichiro Kogure
- Top Scorer
  - (Iran) Vahid Shamsaei (23 goals)

== Goalscorers ==
23 goals

- (Iran) Vahid Shamsaei

21 goals

- (Japan) Kenichiro Kogure

13 goals

- (Turkmenistan) Taji Abdullayev

12 goals

- (Palestine) Hassan Huthut
- (Thailand) Panuwat Janta

11 goals

- (Lebanon) Hayssam Atwi
- (Lebanon) Khaled Takaji
- (Qatar) Abdulaziz Al-Kuwari

10 goals

- (Iraq) Abdul-Karim Ghazi
- (Lebanon) Mahmoud Itani
- (Palestine) Nader Hajjar
- (South Korea) Lee Sang-keun

9 goals

- (Palestine) Mohammed Hassanain
- (South Korea) Lee Kyung-min

8 goals

- (Kyrgyzstan) Emil Kenjisariev
- (Palestine) Hashem Al-Shurafa
- (Palestine) Hazem Hajjar
- (Qatar) Rashid Al-Dosari
- (Thailand) Anucha Munjarern
- (Thailand) Joe Nueangkord
- (Turkmenistan) Yilham Ilmuradov

7 goals

- (Indonesia) Viernes Ricardo Polnaya
- (Iran) Mohammad Hashemzadeh
- (Iran) Hossein Soltani
- (Iraq) Wameedh Shamil
- (Japan) Kensuke Takahashi
- (Kuwait) Ahmad Al-Asfour
- (Qatar) Khalid Gharib
- (Thailand) Prasert Innui
- (Uzbekistan) Abdulla Buriev
- (Uzbekistan) Nikolay Odushev

6 goals

- (China) Wu Zhuoxi
- (China) Yan Fei
- (China) Zhang Jiong
- (Indonesia) Andi Irawan
- (Iran) Majid Raeisi
- (Iran) Mohsen Zareei
- (Kyrgyzstan) Nurjan Djetybaev
- (Palestine) Rafat Rabee
- (Thailand) Lertchai Issarasuwipakorn
- (Thailand) Pattaya Piemkum
- (Uzbekistan) Bahodir Ahmedov

5 goals

- (China) Zhang Xi
- (Hong Kong) Leung Chi Kui
- (Indonesia) Sayan Karmadi
- (Indonesia) Jaelani Ladjanibi
- (Iraq) Zaid Watheq
- (Japan) Kenta Fujii
- (Kuwait) Nawaf Al-Otaibi
- (Lebanon) Rabih Abu Chaaya
- (Malaysia) Ng Boon Leong
- (Tajikistan) Khurshed Makhmudov
- (Turkmenistan) Agajan Resulov
- (Uzbekistan) Aleksandr Korolev
- (Uzbekistan) Anvar Mamedov
- (Uzbekistan) Farruh Zakirov
- (Vietnam) Lê Quốc Khương
- (Vietnam) Nguyễn Tuấn Thành

4 goals

- (China) Wang Xiaoyu
- (China) Yang Du
- (Chinese Taipei) Chang Fu-hsiang
- (Chinese Taipei) Hsueh Ming-wen
- (Indonesia) Vennard Hutabarat
- (Iraq) Zaman Majid
- (Japan) Yuki Kanayama
- (Japan) Takuya Suzumura
- (Kuwait) Fawzi Al-Mass
- (Malaysia) Faizul Abdul Gaffar
- (Palestine) Ahmed Abdalhadi
- (Palestine) Mustafa Yasin
- (Philippines) Alexander Borromeo
- (Thailand) Narongsak Khongkaew
- (Uzbekistan) Furkat Kudratov
- (Uzbekistan) Saidolimhon Sharafutdinov

3 goals

- (Bhutan) Passang Tshering
- (China) Li Jian
- (China) Xiong Sui
- (Chinese Taipei) Chen Kun-shan
- (Chinese Taipei) Ho Kuo-chen
- (Hong Kong) So Sheung Kwai
- (Indonesia) Wahyu Triyanto
- (Iran) Mohammad Reza Heidarian
- (Iran) Javad Maheri
- (Iraq) Yasir Hameed
- (Kuwait) Raed Khalf
- (Kyrgyzstan) Daniar Abdyraimov
- (Kyrgyzstan) Andrey Pestryakov
- (Lebanon) Hassan Hammoud
- (Lebanon) Ibrahim Hammoud
- (Lebanon) Serge Said
- (Macau) Ho Wai Tong
- (Macau) Leong Lap San
- (Malaysia) Mohd Saiful Mohd Noor
- (Philippines) Anton del Rosario
- (Qatar) Mohsin Ali
- (South Korea) Cho Jae-suk
- (South Korea) Oh Su-taek
- (Tajikistan) Eradzh Nasikhov
- (Uzbekistan) Shavkatbek Muhitdinov
- (Uzbekistan) Ilhom Yusupdjanov
