= Chen Kun-shan =

Taiwanese scientist (born 1960)

- 陳錕山
- Born: October 1, 1960 (age 65); Taichung City, Taiwan
- Education: National Taipei University of Technology (BS); National Taiwan University of Science and Technology (MS); University of Texas at Arlington (MS, PhD)
- Scientific career
- Fields: Electrical engineering
- Institutions: Nanjing University; National Central University; Chinese Academy of Sciences
- Thesis: Numerical and theoretical study of rough surface scattering (1990)

Chen Kun-shan (Chinese: 陳錕山; pinyin: Chén Kūnshān; born 1 October 1960) is a Taiwanese electrical engineer. He is a fellow of the Institute of Electrical and Electronics Engineers (IEEE).

== Early life and education ==
Chen was born and raised in Taichung City, Taiwan. He graduated from National Taipei University of Technology with a bachelor's degree in electrical engineering and earned a master's degree in electrical engineering from the National Taiwan University of Science and Technology. He then completed graduate studies in the United States at the University of Texas at Arlington, where he earned a master's degree in electrical engineering in 1987 and his Ph.D. in the subject in 1990.

== Career ==
Chen returned to Taiwan in 1992, and worked at National Central University, he was an editor of IEEE Transactions on Geoscience and Remote Sensing, Journal of Electromagnetic Waves and Applications, and Journal of Aerospace.

Chen became a professor at National Central University in August 1996.

In 2006, he was elected a fellow of the Institute of Electrical and Electronics Engineers (IEEE). In September 2013, he abandoned his job at Taiwan's National Central University and moved to Beijing and worked at the Chinese Academy of Sciences. His action triggered national security concerns in Taiwan.
