= Chinese Taipei national futsal team =

Chinese Taipei
- Association: Chinese Taipei; Football Association
- Confederation: AFC (Asia)
- Head coach: (Chinese Taipei) Liu Hsiang-Hsing
- FIFA code: TPE
- FIFA ranking: 88 (24 September 2026)
Home colours	Away colours

First international
- Chinese Taipei 7–3 Singapore (Tehran, Iran, 14 July 2001)

Biggest win
- Chinese Taipei 11–2 Maldives (Macau, 21 April 2004)

Biggest defeat
- Chinese Taipei 1–16 Iran (Jakarta, Indonesia, 25 October 2002)

FIFA World Cup
- Appearances: 1 (First in 2004)
- Best result: Group stage (2004)

AFC Futsal Championship
- Appearances: 11 (First in 2001)
- Best result: Quarterfinals (2003)

EAFF Futsal Championship
- Appearances: 2 (First in 2009)
- Best result: (silver) 2nd place (2013)

The Chinese Taipei national futsal team represents Taiwan in international futsal competitions. It is governed by the Chinese Taipei Football Association.

== Competition history ==
=== FIFA Futsal World Cup ===
World Cup record
Year	Round	Pld	W	D	L	GS	GA	DIF
(Netherlands) 1989	did not enter							
(Hong Kong) 1992	did not enter							
(Spain) 1996	did not enter							
(Guatemala) 2000	did not enter							
(Taiwan) 2004	Group Stage	3	0	0	3	2	29	-27
(Brazil) 2008	did not qualify							
(Thailand) 2012	did not qualify							
(Colombia) 2016	did not qualify							
(Lithuania) 2020	did not qualify							
(Uzbekistan) 2024	did not qualify							
Total	1/10	3	0	0	3	2	29	–27

=== Asian Indoor Games ===
Asian Indoor and Martial Arts Games record
Year	Round	M	W	D	L	GF	GA	GD
(Thailand) 2005	Did not enter							
(Macau) 2007	Did not enter							
(Vietnam) 2009	Did not enter							
(South Korea) 2013	Group stage	2	0	0	2	2	12	-10
(Turkmenistan) 2017	Group stage	4	1	0	3	8	15	-7
Total	2/5	6	1	0	5	10	27	-17

=== AFC Futsal Asian Cup ===
AFC Futsal Asian Cup									Qualification							
Year	Round	M	W	D	L	GF	GA	GD	M	W	D	L	GF	GA	GD	Link
(Malaysia) 1999	did not enter								No qualification							
(Thailand) 2000	did not enter								No qualification							
(Iran) 2001	Group Stage	4	1	0	3	16	25	–9	No qualification							
(Indonesia) 2002	Group Stage	3	0	0	3	8	28	–20	No qualification							
(Iran) 2003	Quarterfinals	4	2	0	2	14	21	–7	No qualification							
(Macau) 2004	Group Stage	3	1	0	2	14	11	+3	No qualification							
(Vietnam) 2005	Second round (Plate)	6	4	0	2	22	12	+10	No qualification							
(Uzbekistan) 2006	First round	3	0	0	3	7	16	–9								
(Japan) 2007	did not qualify															
(Thailand) 2008	Group Stage	3	0	0	3	4	20	–16								
(Uzbekistan) 2010	Group Stage	3	0	0	3	6	16	–10								
(United Arab Emirates) 2012	Group Stage	3	0	0	3	7	15	–8								
(Vietnam) 2014	Group Stage	3	1	0	2	10	15	–5								
(Uzbekistan) 2016	Group Stage	3	0	1	2	9	15	–6								
(Taiwan) 2018	Group Stage	3	1	1	1	8	9	–1								
(Turkmenistan) 2020	did not qualify/Cancelled															
(Kuwait) 2022	Group Stage	3	0	1	2	3	15	–12								
(Thailand) 2024	Did not qualify															
(Indonesia) 2026	Did not qualify															
Total	13/18	44	10	3	31	128	218	–90								

=== AFC Futsal Asian Cup qualification (East Asia) ===
EAFF Futsal Championship record
Year	Round	Pld	W	D	L	GS	GA	DIF
(China) 2009	Third place	5	3	0	2	21	21	0
(Malaysia) 2012	Third place	4	2	0	2	20	18	+2
(Vietnam) 2013	Runners-up	4	3	1	0	14	8	+6
(Mongolia) 2015	Runners-up	4	3	0	1	18	15	+3
(Thailand) 2017	Fourth place	4	2	1	1	15	12	+3
(China) 2019	Fifth place	3	1	1	1	10	13	-3
(Malaysia) 2022	Third place	4	2	0	2	13	14	-1
Total	7/7	29	17	3	9	111	101	+10

== Players ==
=== Current squad ===
Players called for the 2024 AFC Futsal Asian Cup Qualification.

No.	Pos.	Player	Date of birth (age)	Club
1	GK	Chiang Hsin-wei	9 December 1996 (age 29)	(Chinese Taipei Football Association) YTFC
2	FP	Hsieh Ching-cheng		(Chinese Taipei Football Association) Chiayi Tien Ching F.C.
3	FP	Liu Ju-ming		(Chinese Taipei Football Association) Taichung Travellers F.C.
4	FP	Huang Wei-lun		(Chinese Taipei Football Association) Chiayi Tien Ching F.C.
5	FP	Wang Kun-wei		(Chinese Taipei Football Association) Chiayi Tien Ching F.C.
6	FP	Tai Wei-jen		(Chinese Taipei Football Association) YTFC
7	FP	Tang Wei-tai		(Chinese Taipei Football Association) YTFC
8	FP	Huang Po-chun	23 August 1993 (age 33)	(Chinese Taipei Football Association) YTFC
9	FP	Lin Chih-hung	26 July 1997 (age 29)	(Chinese Taipei Football Association) Chiayi Tien Ching F.C.
10	FP	Chi Sheng-fa	21 August 1993 (age 33)	(Chinese Football Association) Ningbo Brave Tiger F.C.
11	FP	Ho Chia-chen		(Chinese Taipei Football Association) Chiayi Tien Ching F.C.
12	GK	Chen Wei-chun	18 February 2000 (age 26)	(Chinese Taipei Football Association) Chiayi Tien Ching F.C.
13	FP	Chen Ching-hsuan		(Chinese Taipei Football Association) Chiayi Tien Ching F.C.
14	FP	Hou Pei-hong		(Chinese Taipei Football Association) Chiayi Tien Ching F.C.

=== Previous squads ===
AFC Futsal Championship

- 2018 AFC Futsal Championship squads

== Managers ==
- Damien Knabben (2004)
- Chen Kuei-Jen (陳貴人) (2007–2011)
- Tsai Chia-Feng (蔡佳峰) (2011–2015)
- Chen Yung-Sheng (陳永盛) (2015–2017)
- José Adil Amarante (阿迪爾) (2017–2018, 2023)
- Chang Chien-Ying (張仟縈) (2018–2022)
- Liu Hsiang-Hsing (劉祥興) (2025-)

== See also ==
- Chinese Taipei national football team
