= Hong Kong national futsal team =

Hong Kong
- Association: Football Association of Hong Kong, China
- Confederation: AFC (Asia)
- FIFA code: HKG
- FIFA ranking: 118 (24 September 2026)
Home colours	Away colours

First international
- Hong Kong 0 – 6 United States (Hong Kong; 13 November 1992)

Biggest win
- Hong Kong 14 – 2 Macau (Kuantan; 20 April 2006)

Biggest defeat
- Hong Kong 0 – 15 Iran (Macau; 17 April 2004)

FIFA World Cup
- Appearances: 1 (First in 1992)
- Best result: Round 1 (1992)

AFC Futsal Championship
- Appearances: 5 (First in 2003)
- Best result: Round 1 (2003, 2004, 2005, 2006, 2007)

EAFF Futsal Championship
- Appearances: 2 (First in 2009)
- Best result: Fourth place (2013)

The Hong Kong national futsal team represents Hong Kong during international futsal competitions. It is under the administration of the Football Association of Hong Kong, China. The national team was first formed in 1992 due to the 1992 FIFA Futsal World Championship being held in Hong Kong.

== Competition record ==
=== FIFA Futsal World Cup ===
- 1989 – Did not enter
- 1992 – Round 1 (host)
- 1996 – Did not qualify
- 2000 – Did not enter
- 2004 – Did not qualify
- 2008 – Did not enter
- 2012 – Did not qualify
- 2016 – Did not qualify
- 2021 – Did not qualify
- 2024 – Did not qualify

=== AFC Futsal Championship ===
- 1999 – Did not enter
- 2000 – Did not enter
- 2001 – Did not enter
- 2002 – Did not enter
- 2003 – Round 1
- 2004 – Round 1
- 2005 – Round 1
- 2006 – Round 1
- 2007 – Round 1
- 2008 – Did not enter
- 2010 – Did not qualify
- 2012 – Did not qualify
- 2014 – Did not qualify
- 2016 – Did not qualify
- 2018 – Did not qualify
- 2020 – Cancelled
- 2022 – Did not qualify
- 2024 – Did not qualify
- 2026 – Did not qualify

=== EAFF Futsal Championship ===
- 2009 – Group stage
- 2013 – Fourth place

== Results and fixtures ==
Win Draw Lose

== Coaches ==
- 1992: Victor Hermans
- 2003–2009: Tsang Wai Chung
