= Evgeniy Malinin =

Kyrgyzstani footballer

Personal information
- Date of birth: 8 September 1986 (age 40)
- Place of birth: Kyrgyz SSR, Soviet Union
- Height: 1.77 m (5 ft 10 in)
- Position: Midfielder

Senior career*
Years	Team	Apps	(Gls)
2004	Abdysh-Ata Kant	16	(1)
2005	Alma-Ata	4	(0)
2005	Tsesna	21	(5)
2006	Astana	1	(0)
2007	Kairat	13	(0)
2007	Megasport	13	(0)

International career^{‡}
2011	Kyrgyzstan	3	(0)
- * Club domestic league appearances and goals as of 1 February 2018 ‡ National team caps and goals as of 1 February 2018

Evgeniy Malinin (Russian: Евгений Малинин, born 8 September 1986) is a Kyrgyzstan footballer

He is a member of the Kyrgyzstan national football team.

== Club career stats ==
Last update: 16 March 2008

Season	Team	Country	Division	Apps	Goals
2004	Abdish-Ata Kant	Kyrgyzstan	1	16	1
2005	FC Almaty	Kazakhstan	1	4	0
2005	FC Cesna	Kazakhstan	2	21	5
2006	FC Astana	Kazakhstan	1	1	0
2007	FC Kairat Almaty	Kazakhstan	1	13	0
