= Tajikistan national futsal team =

Tajikistan
- Nickname(s): The Persian Lions (Persian: Шерҳои Порсӣ, Sherhoi Porsi, شیرهای پارسی)
- Association: Tajikistan Football Federation
- Confederation: AFC (Asia)
- Head coach: Pairav Vakhidov
- FIFA code: TJK
- FIFA ranking: 49 ▲1 (24 September 2026)
- Highest FIFA ranking: 34 (June 2024)
Home colours	Away colours

First international
- Tajikistan 3–10 Kazakhstan (Tehran, Iran; 1 May 1996)

Biggest win
- Tajikistan 22–1 Guam (Macau, Macau; 29 October 2007)

Biggest defeat
- Iran 19–2 Tajikistan (Tashkent, Uzbekistan; 23 May 2010)

FIFA World Cup
- Appearances: 1 (First in 2024)
- Best result: Group stage (2024)

AFC Futsal Championship
- Appearances: 11 (First in 2001)
- Best result: Fourth place (2024)

Asian Indoor and Martial Arts Games
- Appearances: 2 (First in 2007)
- Best result: Quarterfinals (2007)

The Tajikistan national futsal team (Tajik: Тими Миллии футсоли Тоҷикистон, Timi Millii Futsoli Tojikiston}) represents Tajikistan in international futsal competitions and is controlled by the Tajikistan Football Federation, the governing body for futsal in Tajikistan.

== Results ==
- Tajikistan 0-0 Uzbekistan
- Tajikistan 0-3 Japan
- Tajikistan 1-1 Australia

== Tournaments ==
=== FIFA Futsal World Cup ===
FIFA World Cup record
Year	Round	Pld	W	D	L	GS	GA
(Netherlands) 1989	Part of Soviet Union						
(Hong Kong) 1992	Did not enter						
(Spain) 1996	Did not enter						
(Guatemala) 2000	Did not enter						
(Taiwan) 2004	Did not enter						
(Brazil) 2008	Did not qualify						
(Thailand) 2012	Did not qualify						
(Colombia) 2016	Did not qualify						
(Lithuania) 2021	Did not qualify						
(Uzbekistan) 2024	Group stage	3	0	0	3	7	15
Total	1/10	3	0	0	3	7	15

=== Futsal at the Asian Indoor and Martial Arts Games ===
Asian Indoor and Martial Arts Games record
Year	Round	Pld	W	D	L	GS	GA
(Thailand) 2005	Did not enter						
(Macau) 2007	Quarter-finals	5	2	1	2	30	22
(Vietnam) 2009	Group stage	2	0	0	2	4	11
(South Korea) 2013	Did not enter						
(Turkmenistan) 2017	Did not enter						
Total	2/5	7	2	1	4	34	33

=== AFC Futsal Asian Cup ===
AFC Futsal Asian Cup									Qualification							
Year	Round	M	W	D	L	GF	GA	GD	M	W	D	L	GF	GA	GD	Link
(Malaysia) 1999	Did not enter								No qualification							
(Thailand) 2000	Did not enter								No qualification							
(Iran) 2001	Group Stage	4	1	0	3	16	26	-10	No qualification							
(Indonesia) 2002	Did not enter								No qualification							
(Iran) 2003	Did not enter								No qualification							
(Macau) 2004	Did not enter								No qualification							
(Vietnam) 2005	Round 2 (Cup)	6	3	0	3	25	27	-2	No qualification							
(Uzbekistan) 2006	Group Stage	3	2	0	1	16	18	-2								
(Japan) 2007	Quarter-finals	4	1	1	2	11	15	-4								
(Thailand) 2008	Group Stage	3	1	0	2	6	27	-21								
(Uzbekistan) 2010	Group Stage	3	1	0	2	10	27	-17								
(United Arab Emirates) 2012	Group Stage	3	1	0	2	8	12	-4								
(Vietnam) 2014	Group Stage	3	0	0	3	5	21	-16								
(Uzbekistan) 2016	Group Stage	3	0	1	2	8	16	-6								
(Taiwan) 2018	Group Stage	3	1	0	2	11	8	+3								
(Kuwait) 2022	Quarter-finals	4	2	0	2	16	14	+2								
(Thailand) 2024	Fourth Place	6	2	4	0	15	12	+3								
2026	Group Stage	3	0	2	1	1	4	-3								
Total:13/18	Fourth Place	48	15	8	25	148	227	-79								

== Players ==
=== Current squad ===
The following players were called up to the squad for the 2023 Arab Futsal Cup.

No.	Pos.	Player	Date of birth (age)	Club
1	GK	Firuz Bekmurodov	10 January 1998 (age 28)	(Tajikistan Football Federation) Istiklol
2	GK	Murodullo Alikulov	9 June 1987 (age 39)	(Tajikistan Football Federation) Amonatbank
16	GK	Firuz Bozmamadov		(Tajikistan Football Federation) Soro Company
3	FP	Abdukayum Umarov		(Tajikistan Football Federation) Istiklol
4	FP	Samandar Rizomov		(Tajikistan Football Federation) Soro Company
5	FP	Sobirdzhon Gulyakov	8 February 1998 (age 28)	(Tajikistan Football Federation) Amonatbank
6	FP	Idris Yorov		(Tajikistan Football Federation) Soro Company
7	FP	Rustam Hamidov		(Tajikistan Football Federation) Istiklol
8	FP	Muhamadjon Sharipov	12 September 1997 (age 29)	(Tajikistan Football Federation) Soro Company
9	FP	Fayzali Sardorov	8 April 1998 (age 28)	(Tajikistan Football Federation) Soro Company
10	FP	Umed Kuziev	17 December 1997 (age 28)	(Tajikistan Football Federation) Amonatbank
11	FP	Komron Aliyev		(Tajikistan Football Federation) Istiklol
12	FP	Shavkat Halimov	15 November 1997 (age 28)	(Tajikistan Football Federation) Istiklol
13	FP	Bakhtiyor Saliev	16 December 2001 (age 24)	(Tajikistan Football Federation) Soro Company
14	FP	Dilshod Salomov (captain)	5 October 1995 (age 31)	(Tajikistan Football Federation) Soro Company

=== Previous squads ===
AFC Futsal Championship

- 2018 AFC Futsal Championship squads

== See also ==
- Tajikistan national football team
- Tajikistan national under-17 football team
- Tajikistan national under-20 football team
- Tajikistan national under-23 football team
- Tajikistan futsal league
