= Yan Fei =

- Traditional Chinese: 顏斐
- Simplified Chinese: 颜斐
Transcriptions
Standard Mandarin
- Hanyu Pinyin: Yán Fěi
Yue: Cantonese
- Jyutping: Ngaan^{4} Fei^{2}

Courtesy name
- Chinese: 文林
Transcriptions
Standard Mandarin
- Hanyu Pinyin: Wén Lín
Yue: Cantonese
- Jyutping: Man^{4} Lam^{4}

Yan Fei (simplified Chinese: 颜斐; traditional Chinese: 顏斐), courtesy name Wenlin (Chinese: 文林), was a Grand Administrator of Jingzhao during the Three Kingdoms period.

Yan Fei was from Jibei. When Cao Pi was the presumptive heir to the Cao Wei throne, Yan was one of his attendants. After Cao became the emperor, Yan was appointed a Gentleman-in-Attendance of the Yellow Gates, an official who served at the palace. After Jingzhao experienced a civil war and was conquered by the general Ma Chao, Yan "restored good and popular government" upon becoming the region's grand administrator. People at the time largely had little experience in farming. Yan encouraged his people to do urban agriculture work, suggesting that they use their leisurely time to farm. At his home, Yan started vegetable plots. Observing that the citizenry were in the predicament of lacking carts and cattle, he urged them to make carts, sell pigs and dogs, and buy cattle. Within two years, nearly all households had carts and cattle. According to the Chinese historical text Weilüe, under Yan's leadership, Jingzhao became the best of Yongzhou's ten prefectures.

== See also ==
- Lists of people of the Three Kingdoms
