= 2004 AFC Futsal Championship =

2004年亞洲五人制足球錦標賽 Copa Asiática de Futsal da AFC 2004

Tournament details
- Host country: Macau
- Dates: 16–25 April
- Teams: 18 (from 1 confederation)
- Venue: 1 (in 1 host city)

Final positions
- Champions: Iran (6th title)
- Runners-up: Japan
- Third place: Thailand
- Fourth place: Uzbekistan

Tournament statistics
- Matches played: 40
- Goals scored: 433 (10.83 per match)
- Top scorer: (Iran) Vahid Shamsaei (33 goals)
- Best player: (Iran) Mohammad Reza Heidarian

The 2004 AFC Futsal Championship was held in Macau from 16 to 25 April 2004.

== Venue ==
Macau
IPM Multisport Pavilion
Capacity: 3,800
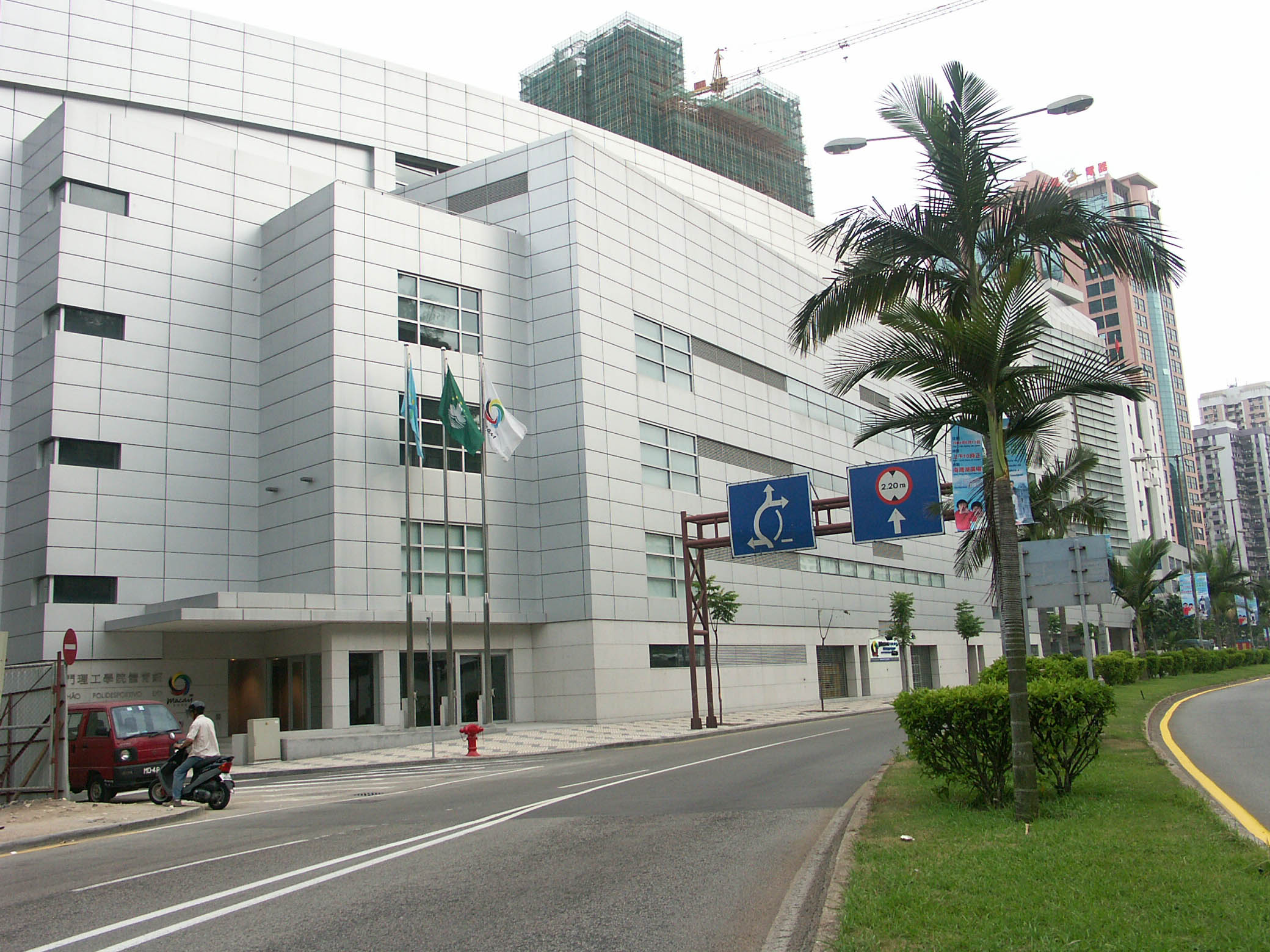

== Draw ==
Group A	Group B	Group C	Group D
Iran; Uzbekistan; Cambodia; Indonesia; Hong Kong	Chinese Taipei; Kuwait; South Korea; Maldives	Japan; Macau; Kyrgyzstan; Lebanon; Philippines	Thailand; China; Malaysia; Guam

== Group stage ==
=== Group A ===
Team	Pld	W	D	L	GF	GA	GD	Pts
Iran	4	4	0	0	60	5	+55	12
Uzbekistan	4	3	0	1	20	9	+11	9
Indonesia	4	1	0	3	11	22	−11	3
Hong Kong	4	1	0	3	10	31	−21	3
Cambodia	4	1	0	3	12	46	−34	3

16 April 2004
14:00

Cambodia	8–4	Hong Kong

IPM Multisport Pavilion, Macau

17 April 2004
18:00

Hong Kong	0–15	Iran

IPM Multisport Pavilion, Macau

17 April 2004
21:30

Indonesia	0–1	Uzbekistan

IPM Multisport Pavilion, Macau

18 April 2004
21:30

Iran	13–3	Indonesia

IPM Multisport Pavilion, Macau

19 April 2004
19:45

Cambodia	1–13	Uzbekistan

IPM Multisport Pavilion, Macau

19 April 2004
21:30

Hong Kong	6–3	Indonesia

IPM Multisport Pavilion, Macau

20 April 2004
19:45

Uzbekistan	5–0	Hong Kong

IPM Multisport Pavilion, Macau

20 April 2004
21:30

Iran	24–1	Cambodia

IPM Multisport Pavilion, Macau

21 April 2004
19:45

Uzbekistan	1–8	Iran

IPM Multisport Pavilion, Macau

21 April 2004
21:30

Cambodia	2–5	Indonesia

IPM Multisport Pavilion, Macau

=== Group B ===
Team	Pld	W	D	L	GF	GA	GD	Pts
South Korea	3	3	0	0	32	8	+24	9
Kuwait	3	2	0	1	28	6	+22	6
Chinese Taipei	3	1	0	2	14	11	+3	3
Maldives	3	0	0	3	5	54	−49	0

16 April 2004
21:00

Kuwait	20–0	Maldives

IPM Multisport Pavilion, Macau

17 April 2004
16:15

South Korea	4–2	Chinese Taipei

IPM Multisport Pavilion, Macau

18 April 2004
16:15

Maldives	3–23	South Korea

IPM Multisport Pavilion, Macau

19 April 2004
14:30

Chinese Taipei	1–5	Kuwait

IPM Multisport Pavilion, Macau

20 April 2004
16:15

Kuwait	3–5	South Korea

IPM Multisport Pavilion, Macau

21 April 2004
14:30

Chinese Taipei	11–2	Maldives

IPM Multisport Pavilion, Macau

=== Group C ===
Team	Pld	W	D	L	GF	GA	GD	Pts
Japan	4	4	0	0	37	1	+36	12
Lebanon	4	2	1	1	19	8	+11	7
Kyrgyzstan	4	2	1	1	15	7	+8	7
Macau	4	1	0	3	9	35	−26	3
Philippines	4	0	0	4	4	33	−29	0

16 April 2004
15:45

Kyrgyzstan	5–0	Philippines

IPM Multisport Pavilion, Macau

16 April 2004
17:30

Lebanon	0–4	Japan

IPM Multisport Pavilion, Macau

17 April 2004
19:45

Lebanon	8–1	Macau

IPM Multisport Pavilion, Macau

18 April 2004
18:00

Macau	1–7	Kyrgyzstan

IPM Multisport Pavilion, Macau

18 April 2004
19:45

Philippines	1–9	Lebanon

IPM Multisport Pavilion, Macau

19 April 2004
16:15

Macau	7–3	Philippines

IPM Multisport Pavilion, Macau

19 April 2004
18:00

Japan	4–1	Kyrgyzstan

IPM Multisport Pavilion, Macau

20 April 2004
18:00

Japan	12–0	Philippines

IPM Multisport Pavilion, Macau

21 April 2004
16:15

Kyrgyzstan	2–2	Lebanon

IPM Multisport Pavilion, Macau

21 April 2004
18:00

Macau	0–17	Japan

IPM Multisport Pavilion, Macau

=== Group D ===
Team	Pld	W	D	L	GF	GA	GD	Pts
Thailand	3	2	1	0	36	4	+32	7
China	3	2	1	0	34	4	+30	7
Malaysia	3	1	0	2	18	18	0	3
Guam	3	0	0	3	1	63	−62	0

16 April 2004
19:15

Thailand	21–0	Guam

IPM Multisport Pavilion, Macau

17 April 2004
14:30

Malaysia	1–5	China

IPM Multisport Pavilion, Macau

18 April 2004
14:30

Guam	0–15	Malaysia

IPM Multisport Pavilion, Macau

19 April 2004
12:45

China	2–2	Thailand

IPM Multisport Pavilion, Macau

20 April 2004
14:30

China	27–1	Guam

IPM Multisport Pavilion, Macau

21 April 2004
12:45

Thailand	13–2	Malaysia

IPM Multisport Pavilion, Macau

== Knockout stage ==
Quarter-finals
April 23 – Macau
Japan	5
China	2
April 23 – Macau
South Korea	5
Uzbekistan	6
April 23 – Macau
Thailand	9
Lebanon	3
April 23 – Macau
Iran	10
Kuwait	3

Semi-finals
April 24 – Macau
Japan	4
Uzbekistan	2
April 24 – Macau
Thailand	1
Iran	6

Final
April 25 – Macau
Japan	3
Iran	5
Third place
April 25 – Macau
Uzbekistan	1
Thailand	3

=== Quarter-finals ===
23 April 2004
14:30

Japan	5–2	China

IPM Multisport Pavilion, Macau

23 April 2004
16:15

Thailand	9–3	Lebanon

IPM Multisport Pavilion, Macau

23 April 2004
18:00

Iran	10–3	Kuwait

IPM Multisport Pavilion, Macau

23 April 2004
19:45

South Korea	5–6	Uzbekistan

IPM Multisport Pavilion, Macau

=== Semi-finals ===
24 April 2004
16:00

Japan	4–2	Uzbekistan

IPM Multisport Pavilion, Macau

24 April 2004
17:45

Thailand	1–6	Iran

IPM Multisport Pavilion, Macau

=== Third place play-off ===
25 April 2004
16:00

Uzbekistan	1–3	Thailand

IPM Multisport Pavilion, Macau

=== Final ===
25 April 2004
17:45

Japan	3–5	Iran
Kogure; Suzumura; Higa		Hashemzadeh; Mohammadi; Heidarian; Shamsaei

IPM Multisport Pavilion, Macau

== Awards ==
AFC Futsal Championship 2004 winners

Iran
6th title

Reza Nasseri, Kazem Sadeghi, Hamid Reza Abrarinia, Mohammad Reza Heidarian, Siamak Dadashi, Kazem Mohammadi, Mohsen Zareei, Vahid Shamsaei, Majid Raeisi, Mohammad Keshavarz, Mohammad Hashemzadeh, Amir Hanifi, Babak Masoumi, Farhad Fakhim
Coach: (Iran) Mohammad Hassan Ansarifard

- Most Valuable Player
  - (Iran) Mohammad Reza Heidarian
- Top Scorer
  - (Iran) Vahid Shamsaei (33 goals)
- Fair-Play Award
  - Iran
