= Macau national futsal team =

- Nickname(s): The Greens
- Association: Macau Football Association
- Confederation: AFC (Asia)
- FIFA code: MAC
- FIFA ranking: 116 (24 September 2026)
Home colours	Away colours

First international
- Iran 22–0 Macau (Bangkok, Thailand; 5 May 2000)

Biggest win
- Macau 13–4 Timor-Leste (Macau, Macau; 10 October 2006)

Biggest defeat
- Macau 0–38 Brazil (Macau, Macau; 11 November 2004)

FIFA World Cup
- Appearances: None

AFC Futsal Championship
- Appearances: 4 (First in 2000)
- Best result: Group stage (2000, 2003, 2004, 2005)

EAFF Futsal Championship
- Appearances: 2 (First in 2009)
- Best result: Group stage (2009, 2013, 2017)

The Macau national futsal team represents Macau in international futsal competitions. It is controlled by the Macau Football Association.

== Tournament records ==
=== FIFA Futsal World Cup ===
FIFA World Cup Record
Year	Round	Pld	W	D*	L	GS	GA
(Netherlands) 1989	did not enter						
(Hong Kong) 1992	did not enter						
(Spain) 1996	did not enter						
(Guatemala) 2000	did not qualify						
(Taiwan) 2004	did not qualify						
(Brazil) 2008	did not qualify						
(Thailand) 2012	did not qualify						
(Colombia) 2016	did not enter						
(Lithuania) 2021	did not qualify						
(Uzbekistan) 2024	did not qualify						
Total	0/10	-	-	-	-	-	-

=== AFC Futsal Asian Cup ===
AFC Futsal Asian Cup
Year	Round	Pld	W	D*	L	GS	GA
(Malaysia) 1999	did not enter						
(Thailand) 2000	Group stage	4	0	0	4	5	45
(Iran) 2001	did not enter						
(Indonesia) 2002	did not enter						
(Iran) 2003	Group stage	3	0	0	3	2	35
(Macau) 2004	Group stage	4	1	0	3	9	35
(Vietnam) 2005	Group stage	3	0	1	2	5	24
(Uzbekistan) 2006	did not qualify						
(Japan) 2007	did not enter						
(Thailand) 2008	did not qualify						
(Uzbekistan) 2010	did not qualify						
(United Arab Emirates) 2012	did not qualify						
(Vietnam) 2014	did not qualify						
(Uzbekistan) 2016	did not enter						
(Taiwan) 2018	did not qualify						
(Turkmenistan) 2020	cancelled						
(Kuwait) 2022	did not enter						
(Thailand) 2024	did not qualify						
(Indonesia) 2026	did not qualify						
Total	4/17	14	1	1	12	21	139

=== EAFF Futsal Championship ===
EAFF Futsal Championship
Year	Round	Pld	W	D*	L	GS	GA
(China) 2009	Group stage	3	0	0	3	7	28
(Malaysia) 2011	Group stage	2	0	0	2	2	21
(Vietnam) 2013	Group stage	4	0	0	4	5	45
(Mongolia) 2015	Did not enter						
(Thailand) 2017	Group stage	3	0	0	3	2	23
(China) 2019	Group stage	2	0	0	2	3	23
(Malaysia) 2022	Did not enter						
Total	5/7	14	0	0	14	19	140

== See also ==
- Sport in Macau
