= South Korea national futsal team =

Korea Republic
- Nickname(s): Taegeuk Warriors; The Red Devils; The Reds
- Association: Korea Football Association
- Confederation: AFC (Asia)
- Head coach: Lee Sang-jin
- Asst coach: Lee Chang-hwan
- Home stadium: Paju NFC Futsal Stadium
- FIFA code: KOR
- FIFA ranking: 69 ▲1 (24 September 2026)
Home colours	Away colours

First international
- Japan 1–2 South Korea (Shanghai, China; 27 March 1996)

Biggest win
- South Korea 26–1 Guam (Beijing, China; 25 November 2009)

Biggest defeat
- Iran 14–1 South Korea (Dubai, United Arab Emirates; 25 May 2012)

FIFA World Cup
- Appearances: 0

Asian Cup
- Appearances: 12 (First in 1999)
- Best result: Runners-up (1999)

Asian Indoor and Martial Arts Games
- Appearances: 2 (First in 2009)
- Best result: Quarter-finals (2013)

Confederations Cup
- Appearances: 0

Grand Prix de Futsal
- Appearances: 0

The South Korea national futsal team (Korean: 대한민국 풋살 국가대표팀, recognized as Korea Republic by FIFA) represents South Korea in international futsal and is governed by the Korea Football Association.

South Korea finished runners-up in inaugural AFC Futsal Asian Cup, but it lost its competitiveness in Asian futsal unlike in football due to lack of attention. In 2024, the president of Korea Futsal League (FK-League Federation) claimed the vitalization of South Korean futsal could help South Korean football expand its base, while the country was suffering from low fertility.

== All-time results ==
As of 11 October 2023

Year	Pld	W	D	L	GF	GA	GD	Win %	Ref.
1996	3	2	0	1	14	11	+3	66.67	
1997	Did not play								
1998	Did not play								
1999	8	3	1	4	33	40	−7	37.50	
2000	3	1	1	1	18	14	+4	33.33	
2001	6	4	0	2	20	22	−2	66.67	
2002	7	3	1	3	39	33	+6	42.86	
2003	4	3	1	0	19	11	+8	75.00	
2004	4	3	0	1	37	14	+23	75.00	
2005	6	2	0	4	32	24	+8	33.33	
2006	3	1	1	1	14	8	+6	33.33	
2007	6	3	0	3	43	15	+28	50.00	
2008	3	0	1	2	11	13	−2	0.00	
2009	6	1	0	5	41	27	+14	16.67	
2010	3	0	1	2	10	21	−11	0.00	
2011	4	3	0	1	22	9	+13	75.00	
2012	5	1	0	4	6	31	−25	20.00	
2013	9	4	0	5	44	28	+16	44.44	
2014	3	0	0	3	1	19	−18	0.00	
2015	4	2	1	1	21	14	+7	50.00	
2016	Did not play								
2017	2	2	0	0	8	4	+4	100.00	
2018	5	1	0	4	10	34	−24	20.00	
2019	3	2	0	1	13	5	+8	66.67	
2020	Did not play								
2021	Did not play								
2022	8	2	1	5	14	33	−19	25.00	
2023	3	2	0	1	13	7	+6	66.67	
Total	108	45	9	54	483	440	+43	41.67	—

== Recent results and fixtures ==
The following is a list of match results in the last 12 months, as well as any future matches that have been scheduled.

Win Draw Lose Fixture

== Players ==
=== Current squad ===
The following players were called for the 2022 AFC Futsal Asian Cup qualification, held in May 2022.

No.	Pos.	Player	Date of birth (age)	Club
1	GK	Seo Jung-woo	20 June 1990 (age 36)	(Korea Football Association) Gyeonggi LBFS
2	GK	Lee Woo-jin	8 September 1990 (age 36)	(Korea Football Association) Seoul Eunpyeong
3	FP	Ah Kwang-su	17 August 1992 (age 34)	(Korea Football Association) Jeonju MAG
4	FP	Kim Yun-young	16 November 2000 (age 26)	(Korea Football Association) Nowon FS
5	FP	Yoo Seung-mu	23 September 1989 (age 37)	(Korea Football Association) Goyang Bulls
6	FP	Lee Jin-hyuk	20 December 1995 (age 30)	(Korea Football Association) Yes Gumi
7	FP	Kim Min-kook	17 February 1987 (age 39)	(Korea Football Association) Gyeonggi LBFS
8	FP	Kang Ju-kwang	17 August 1994 (age 32)	(Korea Football Association) Seoul Eunpyeong
9	FP	Park Jeong-jin	12 October 1994 (age 32)	(Korea Football Association) Goyang Bulls
10	FP	Shin Jong-hoon	23 January 1990 (age 36)	(Korea Football Association) Jeonju MAG
11	FP	Chun Jin-woo	21 November 1987 (age 38)	(Korea Football Association) Yes Gumi
12	FP	Lee An	23 September 1993 (age 33)	(Korea Football Association) Yes Gumi
13	FP	Eom Tae-yeon	23 September 1994 (age 32)	(Korea Football Association) Nowon FS
14	FP	Un Hwang	4 September 1988 (age 38)	(Korea Football Association) Gyeonggi LBFS

== Competitive record ==
Champions Runners-up Third place Tournament played on home soil

=== FIFA Futsal World Cup ===
FIFA Futsal World Cup record									Qualification record					
Year	Round	Pld	W	D	L	GF	GA	Squad	Pld	W	D	L	GF	GA
(Netherlands) 1989	Did not enter								Not held					
(Hong Kong) 1992	Did not enter								Did not enter					
(Spain) 1996	Did not qualify								3	2	0	1	14	11
(Guatemala) 2000	Did not qualify								Via AFC Futsal Asian Cup					
(Taiwan) 2004	Did not qualify								Via AFC Futsal Asian Cup					
(Brazil) 2008	Did not qualify								Via AFC Futsal Asian Cup					
2012	Did not qualify								Via AFC Futsal Asian Cup					
(Colombia) 2016	Did not qualify								Via AFC Futsal Asian Cup					
(Lithuania) 2021	Did not qualify								Via AFC Futsal Asian Cup					
(Uzbekistan) 2024	Did not qualify								Via AFC Futsal Asian Cup					
Total	—	0	0	0	0	0	0	0/10	3	2	0	1	14	11

=== AFC Futsal Asian Cup ===
AFC Futsal Asian Cup record									Qualification record					
Year	Round	Pld	W	D	L	GF	GA	Squad	Pld	W	D	L	GF	GA
(Malaysia) 1999	Runners-up	6	3	1	2	33	27		Not held					
(Thailand) 2000	Group stage	3	1	1	1	18	14		Not held					
(Iran) 2001	Third place	6	4	0	2	20	22		Not held					
(Indonesia) 2002	Fourth place	7	3	1	3	39	33		Not held					
(Iran) 2003	Quarter-finals	4	3	1	0	19	11		Not held					
(Macau) 2004	Quarter-finals	4	3	0	1	37	14		Not held					
(Vietnam) 2005	Group stage	6	2	0	4	32	24		Not held					
(Uzbekistan) 2006	Did not qualify								3	1	1	1	14	8
(Japan) 2007	Group stage	3	1	0	2	9	9		3	2	0	1	34	9
(Thailand) 2008	Group stage	3	0	1	2	11	13		Directly qualified					
(Uzbekistan) 2010	Group stage	3	0	1	2	10	21		4	1	0	3	37	19
(United Arab Emirates) 2012	Group stage	3	0	0	3	4	26		4	3	0	1	22	9
(Vietnam) 2014	Group stage	3	0	0	3	1	19		4	2	0	2	19	10
(Uzbekistan) 2016	Did not qualify								4	2	1	1	21	14
(Taiwan) 2018	Group stage	3	0	0	3	4	25	Squad	2	2	0	0	8	4
(Turkmenistan) ~~2020~~	Cancelled								3	2	0	1	13	5
(Kuwait) 2022	Group stage	3	0	0	3	1	15	Squad	4	2	1	1	11	12
(Thailand) 2024	Group stage	3	0	1	2	5	12	Squad	3	2	0	1	13	7
(Indonesia) 2026	Group stage	3	0	0	3	4	11	Squad	3	2	1	0	7	2
Total	Runners-up	63	20	7	36	247	296	16/18	37	21	4	12	199	99

=== Asian Indoor and Martial Arts Games ===
Asian Indoor and Martial Arts Games record
Year	Round	Pld	W	D	L	GF	GA
(Thailand) 2005	Did not enter						
(Macau) 2007	Did not enter						
(Vietnam) 2009	Group stage	2	0	0	2	4	8
(South Korea) 2013	Quarter-finals	4	2	0	2	20	11
(Turkmenistan) 2017	Did not enter						
Total	Quarter-finals	6	2	0	4	24	19

== See also ==
- Football in South Korea
