= Guam national futsal team =

Guam
- Nickname(s): Matao
- Association: Guam Football Association
- Confederation: AFC (Asia)
- FIFA code: GUM
- FIFA ranking: NR (4 April 2025)
Home colors	Away colors

First international
- Thailand 21 – 0 Guam (Macau, Macau; 16 April 2004)

Biggest win
- no wins

Biggest defeat
- China 27 – 1 Guam (Macau, Macau; 20 April 2004)

FIFA World Cup
- Appearances: None

AFC Futsal Championship
- Appearances: 2 (First in 2004)
- Best result: Group stage (2004 and 2005)

EAFF Futsal Championship
- Appearances: 1 (First in 2009)
- Best result: Group stage (2009)

The Guam national futsal team represents Guam in international futsal competitions and is controlled by the Guam Football Association. They are affiliated to the Asian Football Confederation's East Asian Football Federation region.

== Tournaments ==
=== FIFA Futsal World Cup ===
- 1989 – Did not enter
- 1992 – Did not enter
- 1996 – Did not enter
- 2000 – Did not enter
- 2004 – Did not qualify
- 2008 – Did not enter
- 2012 – Did not enter
- 2016 – Did not enter
- 2021 – Did not qualify
- 2024 – Did not enter

=== AFC Futsal Championship ===
- 1999 – Did not enter
- 2000 – Did not enter
- 2001 – Did not enter
- 2002 – Did not enter
- 2003 – Did not enter
- 2004 – Group stage
- 2005 – Group stage
- 2006 – Did not enter
- 2007 – Did not qualify
- 2008 – Did not enter
- 2010 – Did not qualify
- 2012 – Did not enter
- 2014 – Did not enter
- 2016 – Did not enter

=== EAFF Futsal Championship ===
- 2009 – Group stage
- 2013 – Did not enter
