= Iran national futsal team results =

The following are the Iran national futsal team results in its official international matches.

== Total ==
Last Match 1 Jan 2024

- Win Draw Loss Void

	M	W	D	L	GF	GA	GD
Total	394	267	50	77	2240	878	+1362

=== Total ===
Last updated on April 24, 2024

Decade	M	W	D	L	GF	GA	GD
1990-1999	31	22	0	9	240	92	+148
2000-2009	160	105	17	38	949	373	+576
2010-2019	172	116	31	25	875	352	+523
2020-2029	57	46	2	9	252	85	+167
Total	420	289	50	81	2316	901	+1414

== 1990s ==
=== 1992 ===
Date	Venue	Opponent	Competition	Result	Iranian scorers	Report
2 May 1992	, Hong Kong	Kuwait	1992 WC qualification	19–6 W		Report
3 May 1992	, Hong Kong	Oman	1992 WC qualification	6–2 W		Report
16 November 1992	Hong Kong Coliseum, Hung Hom	Netherlands	1992 FIFA Futsal World Championship	1–2 L	Rajabi 29'03"	Report
18 November 1992	Hong Kong Coliseum, Hung Hom	Italy	1992 FIFA Futsal World Championship	7–5 W	Rajabi 6'01" – 19'05" – 38'10", Varmazyar 7'02" – 23'06", Yousefi 15'04", Fradella 39'12" (o.g.)	Report
20 November 1992	(Hong Kong) Kowloon Park Sports Center, Tsim Sha Tsui	Paraguay	1992 FIFA Futsal World Championship	10–6 W	Rajabi 5'01" – 22'05" – 25'06", Saleh 16'04" – 32'09", Yousefi 35'10" – 35'11", Garousi 37'13" – 39'14", Varmazyar 27'07"	Report
23 November 1992	(Hong Kong) Kowloon Park Sports Center, Tsim Sha Tsui	Poland	1992 FIFA Futsal World Championship	2–0 W	Yousefi 37'01", Rajabi 39'02"	Report
24 November 1992	Hong Kong Coliseum, Hung Hom	Spain	1992 FIFA Futsal World Championship	4–2 W	Rajabi 28'03" – 33'04" – 34'05" – 39'06"	Report
25 November 1992	Hong Kong Coliseum, Hung Hom	Belgium	1992 FIFA Futsal World Championship	4–2 W	Abtahi 7'01", Rajabi 26'03", Saleh 33'04", Varmazyar 39'06"	Report
27 November 1992	Hong Kong Coliseum, Hung Hom	United States	1992 FIFA Futsal World Championship	2–4 L	Rajabi 17'02", Abtahi 23'03"	Report
28 November 1992	Hong Kong Coliseum, Hung Hom	Spain	1992 FIFA Futsal World Championship	6–9 L	Rajabi 16'09" – 23'11", Noamouz 1'01", Abtahi 5'03", Varmazyar 10'04", Yousefi 24'12"	Report

=== 1995 ===
Date	Venue	Opponent	Competition	Result	Iranian scorers	Report
20 February 1995	(United Arab Emirates) , Abu Dhabi	Belarus	Abu Dhabi 1995	2–1 W		Report

=== 1996 ===
Date	Venue	Opponent	Competition	Result	Iranian scorers	Report
1 May 1996	(Iran) Azadi Indoor Stadium, Tehran	Kazakhstan	1996 WC qualification	14–2 W		Report
2 May 1996	(Iran) Azadi Indoor Stadium, Tehran	Tajikistan	1996 WC qualification	15–1 W		Report
3 May 1996	(Iran) Azadi Indoor Stadium, Tehran	Kazakhstan	1996 WC qualification	7–4 W	Hosseini4, Mansourian, Arsalani, Heydari	Report
3 May 1996	(Iran) Azadi Indoor Stadium, Tehran	Tajikistan	1996 WC qualification	11–1 W		Report
21 November 1996	(Spain) Pabellon Pedro Delgado Robledo, Segovia	Malaysia	Friendly	6–4 W	Heydari4, Varmazyar, Saleh	Report
25 November 1996	(Spain) Pabellon Pedro Delgado Robledo, Segovia	Cuba	1996 FIFA Futsal World Championship	7–1 W	Heydari 8'01" – 9'02" – 13'03" – 31'06" – 35'07", Varmazyar 22'04", Hosseini 30'05"	Report
27 November 1996	(Spain) Pabellon Pedro Delgado Robledo, Segovia	Belgium	1996 FIFA Futsal World Championship	2–5 L	Heydari 21'01", Hosseini 33'02"	Report
27 November 1996	(Spain) Pabellon Pedro Delgado Robledo, Segovia	Brazil	1996 FIFA Futsal World Championship	3–8 L	Heydari 20'03" – 39'09", Varmazyar 40'11"	Report

=== 1997 ===
Date	Venue	Opponent	Competition	Result	Iranian scorers	Report
4 December 1997	Singapore Indoor Stadium, Singapore	Spain	TIGER 5s 1997	1–7 L	Rezaei Kamal	Report
5 December 1997	Singapore Indoor Stadium, Singapore	Vietnam	TIGER 5s 1997	14–2 W		Report
6 December 1997	Singapore Indoor Stadium, Singapore	Italy	TIGER 5s 1997	0–4 L	Non	Report
7 December 1997	Singapore Indoor Stadium, Singapore	China	TIGER 5s 1997	5–1 W		Report

=== 1999 ===
Date	Venue	Opponent	Competition	Result	Iranian scorers	Report
10 February 1999	(Georgia (country)) , Tbilisi	Georgia	Friendly	1–4 L		Report
11 February 1999	(Georgia (country)) , Tbilisi	Georgia	Friendly	1–2 L		Report
7 March 1999	(Malaysia) Stadium Negara, Kuala Lumpur	Kyrgyzstan	1999 AFC Futsal Championship	21–0 W		Report
7 March 1999	(Malaysia) Stadium Negara, Kuala Lumpur	Singapore	1999 AFC Futsal Championship	36–0 W	Mohammadi7, Masoumi7, Rezaei Kamal6, Sanei4, Kazemi4, Baghbanbashi3, Heidarian2, Afzal2, Rezaeinejad	Report
8 March 1999	(Malaysia) Stadium Negara, Kuala Lumpur	South Korea	1999 AFC Futsal Championship	9–3 W	Mohammadi2, Rezaei Kamal2, Sanei2, Heidarian2, Kazemi	Report
8 March 1999	(Malaysia) Stadium Negara, Kuala Lumpur	Thailand	1999 AFC Futsal Championship	10–1 W		Report
9 March 1999	(Malaysia) Stadium Negara, Kuala Lumpur	Japan	1999 AFC Futsal Championship	5–2 W	Mohammadi2, Rezaei Kamal, Sanei, Masoumi	Report
10 March 1999	(Malaysia) Stadium Negara, Kuala Lumpur	South Korea	1999 AFC Futsal Championship	9–1 W	Heidarian2, Baghbanbashi2, Kazemi, Afzal, Masoumi, Mohammadi, Rezaeinejad	Report

=== Results by year ===
Year	Pld	W	D	L	GF	GA	GD
1992	10	7	0	3	61	38	+23
1993	0	0	0	0	0	0	0
1994	0	0	0	0	0	0	0
1995	1	1	0	0	2	1	+1
1996	8	6	0	2	65	26	+39
1997	4	2	0	2	20	14	+6
1998	0	0	0	0	0	0	0
1999	8	6	0	2	92	13	+79
Total	31	22	0	9	240	92	+148

== 2000s ==
=== 2000 ===
Date	Venue	Opponent	Competition	Result	Iranian scorers	Report
4 January 2000	(Iran) Pirouzi Arena, Isfahan	Russia	Isfahan 2000	3–3 D		Report
10 January 2000	(Iran) Pirouzi Arena, Isfahan	Russia	Friendly	2–3 L	Shamsaei 14', Baghbanbashi 36'	Report
5 May 2000	(Thailand) Nimibutr Indoor Stadium, Bangkok	Macau	2000 AFC Futsal Championship	22–0 W		Report
6 May 2000	(Thailand) Nimibutr Indoor Stadium, Bangkok	Japan	2000 AFC Futsal Championship	6–2 W	Shamsaei2, Pariazar2, Sanei, Baghbanbashi	Report
8 May 2000	(Thailand) Nimibutr Indoor Stadium, Bangkok	Uzbekistan	2000 AFC Futsal Championship	6–4 W		Report
9 May 2000	(Thailand) Nimibutr Indoor Stadium, Bangkok	Kyrgyzstan	2000 AFC Futsal Championship	10–1 W		Report
11 May 2000	(Thailand) Nimibutr Indoor Stadium, Bangkok	Thailand	2000 AFC Futsal Championship	8–2 W		Report
12 May 2000	(Thailand) Nimibutr Indoor Stadium, Bangkok	Kazakhstan	2000 AFC Futsal Championship	4–1 W		Report
5 October 2000	, Rio de Janeiro, Brazil	Belgium	Rio de Janeiro 2000	4–1 W	Shamsaei 1':01" – 2':49", Mohammadi 28':26", Baghbanbashi 39':39"	Report
6 October 2000	, Rio de Janeiro, Brazil	Brazil	Rio de Janeiro 2000	1–8 L	Ahmad Baghbanbashi	Report
7 October 2000	, Rio de Janeiro, Brazil	Canada	Rio de Janeiro 2000	6–2 W	Masoumi2, Heidarian2, Daniel Dufour o.g, Ted Ullrich o.g	Report
8 October 2000	, Rio de Janeiro, Brazil	Brazil	Rio de Janeiro 2000	1–7 L	Shamsaei 6':09"	Report
5 November 2000	(Russia) CSKA Hall, Moscow	Ukraine	Moscow 2000	2–0 W	Mohammadi, Masoumi	Report
6 November 2000	(Russia) CSKA Hall, Moscow	Russia	Moscow 2000	0–5 L	Non	Report
20 November 2000	Gimnasio Nacional Teodoro Palacios Flores, Guatemala City	Argentina	2000 FIFA Futsal World Championship	1–2 L	Mohammadi 19':02"	Report
22 November 2000	Gimnasio Nacional Teodoro Palacios Flores, Guatemala City	Spain	2000 FIFA Futsal World Championship	1–2 L	Ahmad Baghbanbashi 35':10", Moeeni 40':11"	Report
23 November 2000	Domo Polideportivo de la CDAG, Guatemala City	Cuba	2000 FIFA Futsal World Championship	3–0 W	Shamsaei 13':01", Dadashi 22':02", Heidarian 29':04"	Report

=== 2001 ===
Date	Venue	Opponent	Competition	Result	Iranian scorers	Report
14 July 2001	(Iran) Azadi Indoor Stadium, Tehran	Palestine	2001 AFC Futsal Championship	16–4 W	Shamsaei3, Shandizi3, Heidarian2, Hashemzadeh2, Dadashi2, Sanei, Pariazar, Mohammadi, Jamal Alhouli o.g	Report
15 July 2001	(Iran) Azadi Indoor Stadium, Tehran	Singapore	2001 AFC Futsal Championship	28–0 W	Shamsaei9, Pariazar3, Mohammadi3, Heidarian2, Hashemzadeh2, Sanei2, Raeisi2, Shandizi, Moeeni, Morgan o.g, Osman Mohammad Nour o.g, Izen Ben Ahmad o.g	Report
16 July 2001	(Iran) Azadi Indoor Stadium, Tehran	Chinese Taipei	2001 AFC Futsal Championship	10–1 W	Shamsaei4, Mohammadi3, Moeeni2, Heydari	Report
16 July 2001	(Iran) Azadi Indoor Stadium, Tehran	Japan	2001 AFC Futsal Championship	8–4 W	Shamsaei5, Shandizi, Moeeni, Mohammadi	Report
18 July 2001	(Iran) Azadi Indoor Stadium, Tehran	Kuwait	2001 AFC Futsal Championship	18–2 W	Shamsaei4, Mohammadi4, Shandizi3, Heidarian2, Sanei2, Moeeni2, Pariazar	Report
20 July 2001	(Iran) Azadi Indoor Stadium, Tehran	Japan	2001 AFC Futsal Championship	8–2 W	Shamsaei2, Mohammadi, Heidarian, Moeeni, Pariazar, Hashemzadeh, Raeisi	Report
20 July 2001	(Iran) Azadi Indoor Stadium, Tehran	Uzbekistan	2001 AFC Futsal Championship	9–0 W	Shamsaei4, Dadashi, Sanei, Pariazar, Hashemzadeh, Heidarian	Report
27 November 2001	, Singapore	Spain	Tiger 5's 2001	0–3 L	Non	Report
28 November 2001	, Singapore	China	Tiger 5's 2001	10–1 W	Shamsaei 8' – 16' – 28' – 32', Hashemzadeh 9' – 10', Mohammadi 16' – 18', Sanei 20', Pariazar 17'	Report
30 November 2001	, Singapore	Costa Rica	Tiger 5's 2001	7–0 W	Shamsaei 5' – 29' – 38', Moeeni 24', Heidarian 26', Hashemzadeh 32', Pariazar 39'	Report
2 December 2001	, Singapore	Japan	Tiger 5's 2001	5–3 W	Dadashi 4', Shamsaei 6' – 15', Hashemzadeh 12', Moeeni 21'	Report

=== 2002 ===
Date	Venue	Opponent	Competition	Result	Iranian scorers	Report
19 March 2002	(Italy) Palapentimele, Reggio Calabria	Argentina	2002 Futsal Mundialito	3–5 L	Shamsaei 17', Dadashi 18' – 39':22"	Report
20 March 2002	(Italy) Palapentimele, Reggio Calabria	Czech Republic	2002 Futsal Mundialito	3–5 L	Mohammadi 13', Sanei 19', Pariazar 37'	Report
22 March 2002	(Italy) Palapentimele, Reggio Calabria	Russia	2002 Futsal Mundialito	2–3 L	Hashemzadeh 38', Dadashi 39'	Report
24 March 2002	(Italy) Palapentimele, Reggio Calabria	Belgium	2002 Futsal Mundialito	9–2 W	Sanei 00':20", Heidarian 17' – 37', Shamsaei 32' – 32':30", Asghari Moghaddam 33':30", Hashemzadeh 35' – 36':30", Seyedi 38':30"	Report
22 October 2002	(Indonesia) Istora Gelora Bung Karno, Jakarta	Uzbekistan	2002 AFC Futsal Championship	5–0 W	Shamsaei3, Hashemzadeh2	Report
23 October 2002	(Indonesia) Istora Gelora Bung Karno, Jakarta	Turkmenistan	2002 AFC Futsal Championship		///	Report
24 October 2002	(Indonesia) Istora Gelora Bung Karno, Jakarta	Malaysia	2002 AFC Futsal Championship	17–0 W	Shamsaei7, Ahangaran3, Raeisi2, Hashemzadeh2, Moeeni2, Pariazar	Report
25 October 2002	(Indonesia) Istora Gelora Bung Karno, Jakarta	Chinese Taipei	2002 AFC Futsal Championship	16–1 W		Report
28 October 2002	(Indonesia) Istora Gelora Bung Karno, Jakarta	Kyrgyzstan	2002 AFC Futsal Championship	10–2 W		Report
29 October 2002	(Indonesia) Istora Gelora Bung Karno, Jakarta	South Korea	2002 AFC Futsal Championship	7–4 W	Shamsaei2, Hashemzadeh2, Sanei, Moeeni, Hamid Shandizi	Report
30 October 2002	(Indonesia) Istora Gelora Bung Karno, Jakarta	Japan	2002 AFC Futsal Championship	6–0 W	Shamsaei2, Moeeni, Pariazar, Heidarian, Dadashi	Report

=== 2003 ===
Date	Venue	Opponent	Competition	Result	Iranian scorers	Report
14 January 2003	(Iran) Azadi Indoor Stadium, Tehran	Italy	Friendly	3–3 D	Shamsaei 26':12", Montovanelli 31':00" o.g, Mohammadi 31':42"	Report
15 January 2003	(Iran) Azadi Indoor Stadium, Tehran	Italy	Friendly	5–5 D	Sanei 2':17", Shamsaei 26':10" – 28':15" – 31':40" – 36':42"	Report
28 April 2003	(Spain) Palacio de Deportes de Santander, Santander	Spain	Friendly	2–6 L	Shamsaei 16' – 26'	Report
29 April 2003	(Spain) Pabellon Municipal de La Rioja, La Rioja	Spain	Friendly	2–2 D	Dadashi 31', Moeeni 35'	Report
3 June 2003	(Malaysia) , Kuala Lumpur	Uzbekistan	KL 5's – Kuala Lumpur 2003	7–1 W	Sanei 3' – 5', Mohammadi 12' – 16', Shandizi 14', Moeeni 15', Dadashi 21'	Report
4 June 2003	(Malaysia) , Kuala Lumpur	England	KL 5's – Kuala Lumpur 2003	14–1 W	Hashemzadeh 5', Shandizi 10' – 27', Moeeni 14' – 32', Pariazar 17' – 28', Sanei 18' – 26', Mohammadi 22', Zareei 32' – 35', Heidarian 38' – 39'	Report
6 June 2003	(Malaysia) , Kuala Lumpur	Argentina	KL 5's – Kuala Lumpur 2003	1–2 L	Mohammadi 9'	Report
27 July 2003	(Iran) Azadi Indoor Stadium, Tehran	Lebanon	2003 AFC Championship	15–2 W	Shamsaei8, Heidarian3, Abdollahnejad2, Hashemzadeh, Dadashi	Report
31 July 2003	(Iran) Azadi Indoor Stadium, Tehran	Kyrgyzstan	2003 AFC Championship	10–1 W	Shamsaei4, Mohammadi2, Zareei, Heidarian, Abdollahnejad, Pariazar	Report
1 August 2003	(Iran) Azadi Indoor Stadium, Tehran	China	2003 AFC Championship	12–2 W	Pariazar4, Shamsaei3, Shandizi2, Heidarian, Dadashi, Raeisi	Report
3 August 2003	(Iran) Azadi Indoor Stadium, Tehran	Uzbekistan	2003 AFC Championship	7–2 W	Shamsaei3, Abdollahnejad, Dadashi, Mohammadi, Zareei	Report
4 August 2003	(Iran) Azadi Indoor Stadium, Tehran	Kuwait	2003 AFC Championship	10–2 W	Shamsaei2, Abdollahnejad2, Mohammadi2, Shandizi2, Zareei, Raeisi	Report
5 August 2003	(Iran) Azadi Indoor Stadium, Tehran	Japan	2003 AFC Championship	6–4 W	Shamsaei 5' – 6' – 22' – 38', Heidarian 2' – 31'	Report
20 October 2003	(Iran) Azadi Indoor Stadium, Tehran	Armenia	Tefal Cup	20–2 W	Shamsaei7, Moeeni3, Zareei2, Raeisi2, Nasseri, Pariazar, Mohammadi, Dadashi, Abdollahnejad, Hashemzadeh	Report
21 October 2003	(Iran) Azadi Indoor Stadium, Tehran	Spain	Tefal Cup	2–2 W	Shamsaei 25' – 40'	Report

=== 2004 ===
Date	Venue	Opponent	Competition	Result	Iranian scorers	Report
30 March 2004	(Iran) Azadi Indoor Stadium, Tehran	Russia	Friendly	3–6 L	Masoumi, Heidarian, Hanifi	Report
31 March 2004	(Iran) Azadi Indoor Stadium, Tehran	Russia	Friendly	3–8 L	Shamsaei 34' – 39', Hanifi 27'	Report
11 April 2004	(Iran) Shahid Dastgerdi Arena, Tehran	Malaysia	Friendly	10–0 W	Shamsaei2, Heidarian2, Masoumi2, Fakhim2, Raeisi, Pariazar	Report
17 April 2004	IPM Multisport Pavilion, Macau	Hong Kong	2004 AFC Futsal Championship	15–0 W	Shamsaei 2' – 5' – 15' – 24' – 35' – 39' – 39', Mohammadi 6' – 37' – 37', Heidarian 14' – 39', Fakhim 13', Masoumi 18', Hanifi 33'	Report
18 April 2004	IPM Multisport Pavilion, Macau	Indonesia	2004 AFC Futsal Championship	13–3 W	Shamsaei 16' – 18' – 20' – 34' – 35' – 36', Hanifi 30' – 31', Hashemzadeh 36' – 37', Mohammadi 23', Heidarian 17', Fakhim 19'	Report
20 April 2004	IPM Multisport Pavilion, Macau	Cambodia	2004 AFC Futsal Championship	24–1 W	Shamsaei9, Raeisi4, Hanifi3, Hashemzadeh3, Mohammadi3, Dadashi2	Report
21 April 2004	IPM Multisport Pavilion, Macau	Uzbekistan	2004 AFC Futsal Championship	8–1 W	Shamsaei4, Masoumi, Raeisi, Hanifi, Fakhim	Report
23 April 2004	IPM Multisport Pavilion, Macau	Kuwait	2004 AFC Futsal Championship	10–3 W	Shamsaei3, Mohammadi3, Hashemzadeh2, Masoumi, Sanei	Report
24 April 2004	IPM Multisport Pavilion, Macau	Thailand	2004 AFC Futsal Championship	6–1 W	Shamsaei2, Hashemzadeh2, Masoumi, Zareei	Report
25 April 2004	IPM Multisport Pavilion, Macau	Japan	2004 AFC Futsal Championship	5–3 W	Hashemzadeh2, Shamsaei, Mohammadi, Heidarian	Report
17 June 2004	(Brazil) Ginásio Paulo Sarasate, Fortaleza	Brazil	Friendly	2–8 L	Hashemzadeh 26':51", Heidarian 34':21"	Report
20 June 2004	(Brazil) Ginásio Paulo Sarasate, Fortaleza	Brazil	Friendly	4–10 L	Shamsaei 32':21" – 36':08" – 39':23", Fakhim 34':26"	Report
2 September 2004	(Iran) Azadi Indoor Stadium, Tehran	Ukraine	Tehran Cup 2004	4–2 W	Shamsaei 4' – 11', Mohammadi 31', Hanifi 34'	Report
3 September 2004	(Iran) Azadi Indoor Stadium, Tehran	Brazil	Tehran Cup 2004	4–4 D	Shamsaei 20' – 36' – 39', Mohammadi 22'	Report
19 September 2004	(Russia) Podmoskovie Arena, Shchyolkovo	Russia	Moscow Cup	2–3 L	Shamsaei 8', Zareei 29'	Report
19 November 2004	(Chinese Taipei) NTU Gymnasium, Taipei	Chinese Taipei	Friendly	8–0 W	Shamsaei 3, Kazem Mohammadi's 2 goals, Majid Rayesi's 2 goals and Amir Hanifi's single goal	Report
22 November 2004	(Chinese Taipei) NTU Gymnasium, Taipei	Portugal	2004 FIFA Futsal World Championship	0–4 L	Non	Report
24 November 2004	(Chinese Taipei) NTU Gymnasium, Taipei	Cuba	2004 FIFA Futsal World Championship	8–3 W	Shamsaei 2' – 39' – 39', Heidarian 8' – 18, Mohammadi 10', Lotfi 35', Fakhim 37'	Report
26 November 2004	(Chinese Taipei) NTU Gymnasium, Taipei	Argentina	2004 FIFA Futsal World Championship	1–6 L	Shamsaei 15':06"	Report

=== 2005 ===
Date	Venue	Opponent	Competition	Result	Iranian scorers	Report
16 April 2005	(Iran) Handball Arena, Tehran	Japan	Friendly	5–3 W	Shamsaei 7' – 40', Hashemzadeh 16', Raeisi 22', Maheri 38'	Report
23 May 2005	(Vietnam) Army Zone Stadium, Ho Chi Minh City	Bhutan	2005 AFC Futsal Championship	27–2 W	Shamsaei14, Soltani4, Raeisi2, Hashemzadeh2, Maheri2, Zareei, Heidarian, Azimaei	Report
25 May 2005	(Vietnam) Phú Thọ Indoor Stadium, Ho Chi Minh City	Kuwait	2005 AFC Futsal Championship	1–0 W	Hashemzadeh	Report
26 May 2005	(Vietnam) Phú Thọ Indoor Stadium, Ho Chi Minh City	Lebanon	2005 AFC Futsal Championship	10–3 W	Shamsaei4, Raeisi3, Hashemzadeh, Maheri, Heidarian	Report
28 May 2005	(Vietnam) Phú Thọ Indoor Stadium, Ho Chi Minh City	Japan	2005 AFC Futsal Championship	1–3 L	Soltani 38'	Report
29 May 2005	(Vietnam) Phú Thọ Indoor Stadium, Ho Chi Minh City	Thailand	2005 AFC Futsal Championship	3–3 D	Zareei 14', Shamsaei 34', Hashemzadeh 37'	Report
31 May 2005	(Vietnam) Phú Thọ Indoor Stadium, Ho Chi Minh City	China	2005 AFC Futsal Championship	10–3 W	Zareei 3' – 7' – 15', Soltani 12' – 40', Hashemian 13', Shamsaei 20' – 24', Heidarian 23', Hashemzadeh 29'	Report
2 June 2005	(Vietnam) Phú Thọ Indoor Stadium, Ho Chi Minh City	Uzbekistan	2005 AFC Futsal Championship	4–1 W	Raeisi 3', Hashemzadeh 8', Shamsaei 13' – 15'	Report
4 June 2005	(Vietnam) Phú Thọ Indoor Stadium, Ho Chi Minh City	Japan	2005 AFC Futsal Championship	2–0 W	Shamsaei 3', Zareei 8'	Report

=== 2006 ===
Date	Venue	Opponent	Competition	Result	Iranian scorers	Report
8 May 2006	(Lebanon) Notre Dame Jamhour, Beirut	Lebanon	Friendly	11–3 W	Latifi 9', Mohammadi 13'-36', Zareei 15', Shamsaei 17'-19'-20'-20'-37'-39', Tikdarinejad 27'	Report
9 May 2006	(Lebanon) Notre Dame Jamhour, Beirut	Lebanon	Friendly	9–1 W	Mohammadi 9'-18', Shamsaei 5'-7', Hashemzadeh 15'-23', Raeisi 25', Daneshvar 33', Hassanzadeh 35'	Report
21 May 2006	(Uzbekistan) Yunusabad Sports Complex, Tashkent	Turkmenistan	AFC Futsal Championship	14–0 W	Hashemzadeh 5'-22'-38', Shamsaei 6'-16'-24'-33'-34', Raeisi 13', Mohammadi 14'-19', Hassanzadeh 32', Latifi 36'-37'	Report
22 May 2006	(Uzbekistan) Yunusabad Sports Complex, Tashkent	Indonesia	AFC Futsal Championship	20–1 W	Mohammadi 4'-21'-25', Latifi 11', Shamsaei 17'-18'-23'-25'-32'-33'-40', Zareei 17'-19'-24'-36', Hashemzadeh 20', Raeisi 26'-29', Tikdarinejad 27', Daneshvar 40'	Report
23 May 2006	(Uzbekistan) Yunusabad Sports Complex, Tashkent	Thailand	AFC Futsal Championship	6–3 W	Shamsaei 2'-20'-30', Nazari 24', Raeisi 27', Zareei 34'	Report
26 May 2006	(Uzbekistan) Yunusabad Sports Complex, Tashkent	Japan	AFC Futsal Championship	1–5 L	Shamsaei 24'	Report
27 May 2006	(Uzbekistan) Yunusabad Sports Complex, Tashkent	Kyrgyzstan	AFC Futsal Championship	5–3 W	Daneshvar 33'-33', Mohammadi 35'-40', Zareei 36'	Report
18 November 2006	(Italy) PalaDolmen, Bisceglie	Italy	Friendly	0–2 L	Non	Report
19 November 2006	(Italy) PalaDolmen, Bisceglie	Italy	Friendly	2–3 L	Pariazar 02':48", Raeisi 29':42"	Report
27 December 2006	(Spain) Pabellón La Rosaleda de Benavente, Benavente	Spain	Friendly	3–3 D	Shamsaei 5', Keshavarz 16'-29'	Report
28 December 2006	(Spain) Pabellón La Rosaleda de Benavente, Benavente	Spain	Friendly	2–5 L	Zareei 11', Azimaei 16'	Report

=== 2007 ===
Date	Venue	Opponent	Competition	Result	Iranian scorers	Report
26 January 2007	(Iran) Azadi Indoor Stadium, Tehran	Russia	B Five Cup 2007	1–2 L	Shamsaei 6'	Report
27 January 2007	(Iran) Azadi Indoor Stadium, Tehran	Uzbekistan	B Five Cup 2007	7–0 W	Shamsaei 2, Masoumi 2, Asghari Moghaddam, Taheri, Hashemzadeh	Report
23 April 2007	(Iran) Handball Federation Arena, Tehran	Thailand	Friendly	8–2 W	Mohammadi 3, Heidarian 2, Taheri 2, Shamsaei	Report
8 May 2007	(Iran) Shahid Heidarian Arena, Qom	Ukraine	Friendly	5–2 W	Shamsaei 6':16" – 15':35" – 23':57" – 37':15", Pariazar 37':57"	Report
13 May 2007	(Japan) Commemoration Park Gymnasium, Amagasaki	Lebanon	2007 AFC Futsal Championship	8–4 W	Taheri 6' – 13' – 32', Asghari Moghaddam 12', Shamsaei 17', Heidarian 23', Hashemzadeh 30', Latifi 39'	Report
14 May 2007	(Japan) Commemoration Park Gymnasium, Amagasaki	Malaysia	2007 AFC Futsal Championship	15–1 W	Latifi 1', Hashemzadeh 4' – 14' – 24', Pariazar 5' – 34', Shamsaei 16' – 17' – 30' – 31' – 35' – 40', Mohammadi 17' – 27', Zahmatkesh 40'	Report
15 May 2007	(Japan) Commemoration Park Gymnasium, Amagasaki	China	2007 AFC Futsal Championship	8–0 W	Asghari Moghaddam 7' – 30', Mohammadi 17', Masoumi 24', Taheri 34', Zahmatkesh 36', Hashemzadeh 38', Pariazar 40'	Report
17 May 2007	(Japan) Commemoration Park Gymnasium, Amagasaki	Australia	2007 AFC Futsal Championship	8–0 W	Latifi 15' – 37', Hashemzadeh 16' – 35' – 36', Masoumi 17', Shamsaei 27' – 31'	Report
18 May 2007	(Japan) Municipal Central Gymnasium, Osaka	Uzbekistan	2007 AFC Futsal Championship	7–3 W	Taheri 4' – 5', Asghari Moghaddam 10', Pariazar 17' – 28', Keshavarz 24', Shamsaei 39'	Report
19 May 2007	(Japan) Municipal Central Gymnasium, Osaka	Japan	2007 AFC Futsal Championship	4–1 W	Latifi 15', Taheri 26', Shamsaei 31', Mohammadi 37'	Report
20 October 2007	(Brazil) Arena Jaraguá, Jaraguá do Sul	Paraguay	2007 Grand Prix de Futsal	6–4 W	Mohammadi3, Hashemzadeh2, Raeisi	Report
21 October 2007	(Brazil) Arena Jaraguá, Jaraguá do Sul	Uzbekistan	2007 Grand Prix de Futsal	2–0 W	Fakhim, Pariazar	Report
22 October 2007	(Brazil) Arena Jaraguá, Jaraguá do Sul	Slovenia	2007 Grand Prix de Futsal	2–4 L	Fakhim 22':23", Mohammadi 33':40"	Report
24 October 2007	(Brazil) Arena Jaraguá, Jaraguá do Sul	Uruguay	2007 Grand Prix de Futsal	6–3 W	Mohammadi 1':22", Asghari Moghaddam 14':29", Zahmatkesh 16':22" – 27':08", Pariazar 22':07" – 22':33"	Report
25 October 2007	(Brazil) Arena Jaraguá, Jaraguá do Sul	Argentina	2007 Grand Prix de Futsal	3–2 W	Mohammadi 4':20" – 22':45", Pariazar 24':44"	Report
27 October 2007	(Brazil) Arena Jaraguá, Jaraguá do Sul	Brazil	2007 Grand Prix de Futsal	0–4 L	Non	Report
14 November 2007	(Hungary) Fonix Sporthall, Debrecen	Brazil	Fonix Cup 2007	2–7 L	Asghari Moghaddam 36':32", Raeisi 39':20"	Report
15 November 2007	(Hungary) Fonix Sporthall, Debrecen	Hungary	Fonix Cup 2007	4–2 W	Taheri 27':44" – 32':47", Daneshvar 28':50, Baranyai 33':33" o.g	Report
17 November 2007	(Hungary) Fonix Sporthall, Debrecen	Turkey	Fonix Cup 2007	6–5 W		Report

=== 2008 ===
Date	Venue	Opponent	Competition	Result	Iranian scorers	Report
30 January 2008	Kuala Lumpur, Malaysia	Brazil	Tiger's Cup 2008	0–4 L	Non	Report
31 January 2008	Kuala Lumpur, Malaysia	Netherlands	Tiger's Cup 2008	3–1 W	Shamsaei2, Taheri	Report
1 February 2008	Kuala Lumpur, Malaysia	China	Tiger's Cup 2008	6–1 W	Shamsaei2, Hassanzadeh2, Keshavarz, Asghari Moghaddam	Report
1 February 2008	Kuala Lumpur, Malaysia	Thailand	Tiger's Cup 2008	2–3 L	Shamsaei 13', Hashemzadeh 36'	Report
2 February 2008	Kuala Lumpur, Malaysia	Indonesia	Tiger's Cup 2008	13–1 W	Keshavarz 9', Daneshvar 13', Latifi 14', Zahmatkesh 17' – 26' – 28' – 33', Asghari Moghaddam 19' – 20', Hassanzadeh 21', Shamsaei 25', Mohammadi 32', Taheri 39'	Report
3 February 2008	Kuala Lumpur, Malaysia	Netherlands	Tiger's Cup 2008	2–1 W	Latifi 31' – 39'	Report
25 March 2008	(Portugal) Pavilhão Municipal de Santo Tirso, Santo Tirso	Portugal	Friendly	2–2 D	Asghari Moghaddam 17', Hashemzadeh 23'	Report
26 March 2008	(Portugal) Municipal Pavilion of Vila Das Aves, Santo Tirso	Portugal	Friendly	1–2 L	Majid Latifi 4'	Report
22 April 2008	Tashkent, Uzbekistan	Uzbekistan	Friendly	1–0 W	Zahmatkesh 35'	Report
24 April 2008	Tashkent, Uzbekistan	Uzbekistan	Friendly	3–0 W	Hassanzadeh, Keshavarz, Daneshvar	Report
11 May 2008	(Thailand) Hua Mark Indoor Stadium, Bangkok	Kuwait	AFC Futsal Championship	12–0 W	Taheri 10' – 27', Heidarian 10', Raeisi 15' – 39', Shamsaei 16' – 37', Hassanzadeh 19' – 36', Asghari Moghaddam 22', Hashemzadeh 23', Keshavarz 35'	Report
12 May 2008	(Thailand) Hua Mark Indoor Stadium, Bangkok	China	AFC Futsal Championship	8–1 W	Taheri 3', Shamsaei 9' – 29', Hassanzadeh 26' – 35', Heidarian 26', Latifi 31', Mohammadi 38'	Report
13 May 2008	(Thailand) Hua Mark Indoor Stadium, Bangkok	Tajikistan	AFC Futsal Championship	14–0 W	Hassanzadeh 5', Sufiev 7' o.g, Shamsaei 9' – 13' – 14' – 40' – 40', Tayyebi 9' – 13', Latifi 13' – 18', Ismoilov 15' o.g, Asghari Moghaddam 36', Heidarian 36'	Report
15 May 2008	(Thailand) Hua Mark Indoor Stadium, Bangkok	Lebanon	AFC Futsal Championship	9–1 W	Taheri 3' – 30', Hashemzadeh 9', Mohammadi 10', Shamsaei 12', Hassanzadeh 23', Latifi 35', M. Tayyebi 36', Raeisi 38'	Report
16 May 2008	(Thailand) Hua Mark Indoor Stadium, Bangkok	Japan	AFC Futsal Championship	1–0 W	Shamsaei 20'	Report
18 May 2008	(Thailand) Hua Mark Indoor Stadium, Bangkok	Thailand	AFC Futsal Championship	4–0 W	Latifi 8', Shamsaei 16' – 23', Heidarian 37'	Report
9 August 2008	(Iran) Azadi Indoor Stadium, Tehran	China	2008 Tehran Cup	5–1 W	Hassanzadeh2, Latifi2, Azimaei	Report
10 August 2008	(Iran) Azadi Indoor Stadium, Tehran	Thailand	2008 Tehran Cup	5–1 W	Hassanzadeh2, Taheri2, Keshavarz	Report
11 August 2008	(Iran) Azadi Indoor Stadium, Tehran	Hungary	2008 Tehran Cup	9–1 W	Shamsaei3, Hassanzadeh2, Taheri2, Keshavarz, Daneshvar	Report
19 August 2008	(Iran) Handball Federation Arena, Tehran	Spain	Friendly	1–2 L	Hassanzadeh 30':28"	Report
20 August 2008	(Iran) Handball Federation Arena, Tehran	Spain	Friendly	1–2 L	Shamsaei 00':12"	Report
1 October 2008	(Brazil) Ginásio do Maracanãzinho, Rio de Janeiro	Spain	2008 FIFA Futsal World Cup	3–3 D	Taheri 3':29", Shamsaee 11':29", Hassanzadeh 11':46"	Report
5 October 2008	(Brazil) Ginásio do Maracanãzinho, Rio de Janeiro	Libya	2008 FIFA Futsal World Cup	4–2 W	Taheri 4':34", Hashemzadeh 6':28" – 16':48", M. Tayyebi 31':54"	Report
7 October 2008	(Brazil) Ginásio do Maracanãzinho, Rio de Janeiro	Uruguay	2008 FIFA Futsal World Cup	4–2 W	Taheri 2':14", M. Tayyebi 8':28", Shamsaee 20':49", Hashemzadeh 27':14"	Report
9 October 2008	(Brazil) Nilson Nelson Gymnasium, Brasília	Czech Republic	2008 FIFA Futsal World Cup	3–2 W	Hassanzadeh 16':42" – 39':33", Shamsaee 30':14"	Report
11 October 2008	(Brazil) Ginásio do Maracanãzinho, Rio de Janeiro	Brazil	2008 FIFA Futsal World Cup	0–1 L	Non	Report
12 October 2008	(Brazil) Ginásio do Maracanãzinho, Rio de Janeiro	Ukraine	2008 FIFA Futsal World Cup	5–4 W	Shamsaee 9':01" pen – 12':26" pen, Pylypiv 10':57" o.g, Taheri 14':08" – 19':03" pen	Report
14 October 2008	(Brazil) Nilson Nelson Gymnasium, Brasília	Italy	2008 FIFA Futsal World Cup	5–5 D	Daneshvar 10':38" – 35':30", Masoudi 12':23", Hashemzadeh 26':30", Hassanzadeh 28':29"	Report

=== 2009 ===
Date	Venue	Opponent	Competition	Result	Iranian scorers	Report
14 March 2009	(Slovenia) Dvorana Lukna, Maribor	Slovenia	Friendly	2–1 W	Latifi 9', Azimaei 39'	Report
15 March 2009	(Slovenia) Rdeca dvorana, Velenje	Slovenia	Friendly	2–2 D	Hassanzadeh 14', Abrarinia 20'	Report
29 March 2009	(Brazil) Ginásio Milton Olaio Filho, São Carlos	Brazil	Friendly	2–4 L	Taheri 26':30", Keshavarz 37':59"	Report
30 March 2009	(Brazil) Ginásio Milton Olaio Filho, São Carlos	Brazil	Friendly	2–2 D	Taheri 8':08", Tikdarinejad 36':02"	Report
27 May 2009	Tripoli, Libya	Libya	Friendly	3–3 D	M. Tayyebi, Shamsaei, Taheri	Report
28 May 2009	Gharyan, Libya	Libya	Friendly	4–1 W		Report
29 May 2009	Sabratha, Libya	Libya	Friendly	4–2 W	Taheri 2, Tikdarinejad, Hassanzadeh	Report
28 June 2009	(Brazil) Goiânia Arena, Goiânia	Uruguay	2009 Grand Prix	5–3 W	J. Soltani 6', Kiaei 14', Tikdarinejad 21', Daneshvar 24', Azimaei 36'	Report
29 June 2009	(Brazil) Goiânia Arena, Goiânia	Romania	2009 Grand Prix	5–2 W	Daneshvar2, Kiaei2, J. Soltani	Report
30 June 2009	(Brazil) Goiânia Arena, Goiânia	Costa Rica	2009 Grand Prix	1–1 D	Azimaei	Report
2 July 2009	(Brazil) Goiânia Arena, Goiânia	Ukraine	2009 Grand Prix	1 (5) – 1 (3) W	Daneshvar	Report
3 July 2009	(Brazil) Goiânia Arena, Goiânia	Czech Republic	2009 Grand Prix	4 (4) – 4 (1) W	H. Soltani2, J. Soltani, Daneshvar	Report
5 July 2009	(Brazil) Ginásio Newton de Faria, Anápolis	Brazil	2009 Grand Prix	1–7 L	J. Soltani 30':08"	Report
21 September 2009	(Iran) Azadi Indoor Stadium, Tehran	Brazil	Friendly	3–4 L	Hassanzadeh 0':45", Taheri 5':17", Nazari 22':10"	Report
23 September 2009	(Iran) Azadi Indoor Stadium, Tehran	Brazil	Friendly	2–4 L	Taheri, Azimaei	Report
7 October 2009	(Libya) Tripoli Grand Hall, Tripoli	Guatemala	2009 Confederations Cup	4–2 W	Tikdarinejad, Taheri, Shamsaei, Asghari Moghaddam	Report
9 October 2009	(Libya) Tripoli Grand Hall, Tripoli	Uruguay	2009 Confederations Cup	4–2 W	Taheri, Shamsaei, M. Tayebi, Hashemzadeh	Report
10 October 2009	(Libya) Tripoli Grand Hall, Tripoli	Solomon Islands	2009 Confederations Cup	6–0 W	Shamsaei2, Taheri, Asghari Moghaddam, Tikdarinejad, Zahmatkesh	Report
12 October 2009	(Libya) Tripoli Grand Hall, Tripoli	Libya	2009 Confederations Cup	1–0 W	Zahmatkesh	Report
22 November 2009	(Iran) Pirouzi Arena, Esfahan	Slovenia	Friendly	3–2 W	Asghari Moghaddam 18', Taheri 24', Latifi 38'	Report
23 November 2009	(Iran) Pirouzi Arena, Esfahan	Slovenia	Friendly	3–2 W	Shamsaei, Taheri, Zahmatkesh	Report

=== Results by year ===
Year	Pld	W	D	L	GF	GA	GD
2000	17	10	1	6	80	43	+37
2001	11	10	0	1	119	20	+99
2002	10	7	0	3	78	22	+56
2003	15	9	4	2	116	37	+79
2004	19	11	1	7	130	66	+64
2005	9	7	1	1	63	18	+45
2006	11	6	1	4	73	29	+44
2007	19	15	0	4	102	46	+56
2008	28	19	3	6	126	43	+83
2009	21	11	6	4	62	49	+13
Total	160	105	17	38	949	373	+576

== 2010s ==
=== 2010 ===
Date	Venue	Opponent	Competition	Result	Iranian scorers	Report
14 January 2010	(Belgium) Topevenementenhal De Soeverein, Lommel	Belgium	Friendly	4–4 D	Taheri 14' – 25', Shamsaei 14', Hassanzadeh 33'	Report
15 January 2010	(Belgium) Topevenementenhal De Soeverein, Lommel	Belgium	Friendly	5–0 W	Daneshvar 4':30", Taheri 6':35" – 9':48", Shamsaei 36':9", Jonathan 19':34" (o.g.)	Report
8 April 2010	(Thailand) CentralPlaza Udon Thani, Udon thani	Uzbekistan	2010 Thailand Five's	2–1 W	Keshavarz 3', Daneshvar 9'	Report
9 April 2010	(Thailand) CentralPlaza Udon Thani, Udon thani	Thailand	2010 Thailand Five's	4–3 W	Taheri 6', Daneshvar 12' – 26', Issarasuwipakorn 22' (o.g.)	Report
10 April 2010	(Thailand) CentralPlaza Udon Thani, Udon thani	Argentina	2010 Thailand Five's	3–1 W	Hashemzadeh 21', Taheri 36', Asghari Moghaddam 37'	Report
23 May 2010	Uzbekistan Sports Complex, Tashkent	Tajikistan	2010 AFC Futsal Championship	19–2 W	Hassanzadeh 1' – 2' – 4', Taheri 4' – 12' – 21' – 22' – 23' – 28' – 38', Zahmatkesh 6' – 8' – 32', Daneshvar 18' – 22' – 30' – 37', Raeisi 24', Tayyebi 37'	Report
24 May 2010	Uzbekistan Sports Complex, Tashkent	Australia	2010 AFC Futsal Championship	9–3 W	Zahmatkesh 4' – 29', Taheri 8' – 32', Keshavarz 14', Tayyebi 24' – 40', Asghari Moghaddam 38', Rahnama 39'	Report
25 May 2010	Uzbekistan Sports Complex, Tashkent	Kuwait	2010 AFC Futsal Championship	7–0 W	Daneshvar 6', Hashemzadeh 9', Tayyebi 22' – 31', Zahmatkesh 36', Taheri 39' – 40'	Report
27 May 2010	Uzbekistan Sports Complex, Tashkent	Lebanon	2010 AFC Futsal Championship	7–1 W	Keshavarz 7', Hashemzadeh 9', Daneshvar 13' – 24', Tayyebi 14', Zahmatkesh 27', Taheri 34'	Report
28 May 2010	Uzbekistan Sports Complex, Tashkent	Japan	2010 AFC Futsal Championship	7–0 W	Daneshvar 1' – 12', Tayyebi 21', Asghari Moghaddam 24' – 27' – 31', Keshavarz 35'	Report
30 May 2010	Uzbekistan Sports Complex, Tashkent	Uzbekistan	2010 AFC Futsal Championship	8–3 W	Asghari Moghaddam 5', Raeisi 12' – 24', Taheri 19', Daneshvar 22' – 31', Hassanzadeh 25' – 27'	Report
17 October 2010	(Brazil) Ginásio Newton de Faria, Anápolis	Russia	2010 Grand Prix de Futsal	2–2 D	Nugumanov 6' (o.g.), Zahmatkesh 10'	Report
18 October 2010	(Brazil) Ginásio da UniEvangélica, Anápolis	Guatemala	2010 Grand Prix de Futsal	6–1 W	Zahmatkesh 16' – 17', Lotfi 16', Taheri 22', Keshavarz 23', Hassanzadeh 24'	Report
19 October 2010	(Brazil) Ginásio da UniEvangélica, Anápolis	Portugal	2010 Grand Prix de Futsal	5–3 W	Taheri 14', Zahmatkesh 16', Hassanzadeh 20', Daneshvar 32', Asghari Moghaddam 33'	Report
21 October 2010	(Brazil) Ginásio Newton de Faria, Anápolis	Argentina	2010 Grand Prix de Futsal	2–0 W	Tayyebi 41', Zahmatkesh 49'	Report
22 October 2010	(Brazil) Ginásio Newton de Faria, Anápolis	Spain	2010 Grand Prix de Futsal	4–6 L	Asghari Moghaddam 6' – 19', Daneshvar 14', Taheri 37'	Report
23 October 2010	(Brazil) Ginásio Newton de Faria, Anápolis	Paraguay	2010 Grand Prix de Futsal	3–5 L	Hassanzadeh 3', Keshavarz 17', Asghari Moghaddam 39'	Report
9 November 2010	(Iran) Pirouzi Arena, Esfahan	Russia	Friendly	3–3 D	Shamsaei 29', Taheri 35', Hassanzadeh 37'	Report
10 November 2010	(Iran) Pirouzi Arena, Esfahan	Russia	Friendly	5–3 W	Montazer 1', Keshavarz 13', Taheri 29' – 38', Shamsaei 36'	Report

=== 2011 ===
Date	Venue	Opponent	Competition	Result	Iranian scorers	Report
16 January 2011	(Iran) Shahediyeh Indoor Hall, Yazd	Belgium	Friendly	4–1 W	Keshavarz, Taheri, Asghari Moghaddam 19':53", Shamsaei	Report
18 January 2011	(Iran) Shahediyeh Indoor Hall, Yazd	Belgium	Friendly	7–1 W	Hassanzadeh2, Tayyebi2, Keshavarz, Taheri, Shamsaei	Report
23 February 2011	(Iran) Pirouzi Arena, Isfahan	Brazil	Friendly	3–4 L	Hassanzadeh, Shamsaei, Taheri	
26 February 2011	(Iran) Pirouzi Arena, Isfahan	Brazil	Friendly	2–3 L	Hassanzadeh, Kazemi	
1 June 2011	Hangzhou, China	Brazil	Friendly	1–3 L	Kiaei 12'	
2 June 2011	Hangzhou, China	Romania	Friendly	3–3 D	Taheri3	
3 June 2011	Hangzhou, China	Japan	Friendly	2–2 D		
4 June 2011	Hangzhou, China	China	Friendly	9–2 W	Shamsaei2, Asghari Moghaddam2, Daneshvar, Tayyebi, Taheri, Javid, Taghizadeh	
16 October 2011	(Brazil) Amadeu Teixeira Arena, Manaus	Belgium	2011 Grand Prix	4–2 W	Hassanzadeh, Shamsaei, Tayyebi, Asghari Moghaddam	
17 October 2011	(Brazil) Amadeu Teixeira Arena, Manaus	United States	2011 Grand Prix	8–0 W	Tayyebi 2, Keshavarz 2, Hassanzadeh 2, Shamsaei, Asghari Moghaddam	
18 October 2011	(Brazil) Amadeu Teixeira Arena, Manaus	Uruguay	2011 Grand Prix	3–1 W	Taheri2, Keshavarz	
20 October 2011	Manaus, Brazil	Guatemala	2011 Grand Prix	4–2 W	Taheri, Hassanzadeh, Shamsaei, Keshavarz	
21 October 2011	Manaus, Brazil	Brazil	2011 Grand Prix	1–4 L	Tayyebi	
22 October 2011	Manaus, Brazil	Argentina	2011 Grand Prix	2–4 L	Javid2	Report
13 November 2011	(Iran) Mokhaberat Arena, Isfahan	Russia	Friendly	3–0 W	Hassanzadeh 32' – 38', Tayyebi 37'	
15 November 2011	(Iran) Mokhaberat Arena, Isfahan	Russia	Friendly	2–3 L	Tayyebi, Yousefi	
27 November 2011	(Iran) Shahediyeh Indoor Hall, Yazd	Croatia	Friendly	4–4 D	Taheri3, Shamsaei	
28 November 2011	(Iran) Shahediyeh Indoor Hall, Yazd	Croatia	Friendly	5–1 W	Taheri2, Hassanzadeh2, Shamsaei	

=== 2012 ===
Date	Venue	Opponent	Competition	Result	Iranian scorers	Report
17 January 2012	(Croatia) Spaladium Arena, Split	Croatia	Friendly	2–1 W	Javid 6', Asghari Moghaddam 23'	Report
19 January 2012	(Croatia) Sportska Dvorana, Jelsa	Croatia	Friendly	2–1 W	Asghari Moghaddam, Taheri	Report
15 April 2012	(Iran) Bandar Festival Hall, Bandar Abbas	Uzbekistan	Friendly	2–2 D	Daneshvar, Shamsaei	Report
17 April 2012	(Iran) Bandar Festival Hall, Bandar Abbas	Uzbekistan	Friendly	4–1 W	Taheri, Esmaeilpour, Shamsaei, Hassanzadeh	Report
27 April 2012	(Iran) Ghadir Hall, Urmia	Kuwait	WAFF Futsal Championship	9–2 W	Shamsaei 21' – 40', Keshavarz 23', Tayyebi 25', Latifi 27', Javid 29', Esmaeilpour 34', Asghari Moghaddam 34' – 37'	Report
29 April 2012	(Iran) Ghadir Hall, Urmia	Palestine	WAFF Futsal Championship	19–1 W	Keshavarz 1' – 24', Hassanzadeh 3' – 5' – 18' – 23', Shamsaei 4' – 22' – 32' – 33' – 38', Asghari Moghaddam 7' – 16' – 30' – 40', Tayyebi 17' – 28' – 34', Esmaeilpour 18'	Report
1 May 2012	(Iran) Ghadir Hall, Urmia	Iraq	WAFF Futsal Championship	7–3 W	Shamsaei 2', Keshavarz 12', Esmaeilpour 14' – 15', Hassanzadeh 21', Asghari Moghaddam 29' – 40'	Report
2 May 2012	(Iran) Ghadir Hall, Urmia	Jordan	WAFF Futsal Championship	5–0 W	Esmaeilpour 9' – 11', Tayyebi 23' – 33', Keshavarz 40'	Report
12 May 2012	(China) Zhejiang Dragon Sports Centre, Hangzhou	China	Friendly	3–1 W	Esmaeilpour, ?, ?	Report
13 May 2012	(China) Zhejiang Dragon Sports Centre, Hangzhou	Japan	Friendly	2–2 D	Hassanzadeh 2	Report
14 May 2012	(China) Zhejiang Dragon Sports Centre, Hangzhou	Romania	Friendly	2–4 L		Report
25 May 2012	(United Arab Emirates) Al-Shabab Stadium, Dubai	South Korea	AFC Futsal Championship	14–1 W	Esmaeilpour 7', Taheri 11', Hassanzadeh 11' – 12' – 33', Javid 15' – 17' – 27', Keshavarz 23' – 29', Asghari Moghaddam 29' – 39', Tayyebi 31', Jeong Eui-Hyun 36' (o.g.)	Report
26 May 2012	(United Arab Emirates) Al-Shabab Stadium, Dubai	Qatar	AFC Futsal Championship	8–0 W	Taheri 1', Keshavarz 2', Tayyebi 15' – 37', Ahmadi 18', Shamsaei 23' – 31', Hassanzadeh 29'	Report
27 May 2012	(United Arab Emirates) Al-Wasl Stadium, Dubai	Australia	AFC Futsal Championship	9–0 W	Taheri 11' – 22', Shamsaei 13' – 40', Hassanzadeh 14' – 33', Bahadori 16', Tayyebi 29', Asghari Moghaddam 37'	Report
29 May 2012	(United Arab Emirates) Al-Shabab Stadium, Dubai	Uzbekistan	AFC Futsal Championship	6–3 W	Ahmadi 5' – 39', Esmaeilpour 7', Hassanzadeh 20', Taheri 22', Tayyebi 32'	Report
30 May 2012	(United Arab Emirates) Al-Wasl Stadium, Dubai	Thailand	AFC Futsal Championship	4–5 L	Shamsaei 4' – 49', Tayyebi 7', Asghari Moghaddam 30'	Report
1 June 2012	(United Arab Emirates) Al-Wasl Stadium, Dubai	Australia	AFC Futsal Championship	4–0 W	Asghari Moghaddam 36' – 40', Taheri 37', Shamsaei 40'	Report
17 September 2012	(Iran) Pirouzi Arena, Esfahan	Russia	Friendly	1–2 L	Keshavarz	Report
18 September 2012	(Iran) Pirouzi Arena, Esfahan	Russia	Friendly	3–3 D	Taheri, Kazemi, Daneshvar	Report
30 October 2012	(Thailand) Sripatum University Arena, Bangkok	Australia	Friendly	0–0 D	Non	Report
2 November 2012	(Thailand) Hua Mark Indoor Stadium, Bangkok	Spain	FIFA Futsal World Cup	2–2 D	Daneshvar 27'50", Tayyebi 30'42"	Report
5 November 2012	(Thailand) Hua Mark Indoor Stadium, Bangkok	Morocco	FIFA Futsal World Cup	2–1 W	Hassanzadeh 19'17", Kazemi 32'05"	Report
8 November 2012	(Thailand) Hua Mark Indoor Stadium, Bangkok	Panama	FIFA Futsal World Cup	4–3 W	Esmaeilpour 3'00", Kazemi 13'02", Taheri 18'44" – 37'12"	Report
11 November 2012	(Thailand) Nimibutr Stadium, Bangkok	Colombia	FIFA Futsal World Cup	1–2 L	Rahnama 34'33"	Report

=== 2013 ===
Date	Venue	Opponent	Competition	Result	Iranian scorers	Report
9 March 2013	(Russia) Centralny, Tyumen	Russia	Friendly	2–2 D	Kiaei 8', Hassanzadeh 19'	Report
10 March 2013	(Russia) Centralny, Tyumen	Russia	Friendly	4–4 D	Sergeev 11'(o.g.), Vafaei 24', Orouji 38', Tayyebi 39'	Report
8 June 2013	(Iran) Shahid Dastgerdi Arena, Tehran	Uzbekistan	Friendly	6–1 W	Javid 14' – 39' – 40', Taheri 24', Vafaei 25', Tayyebi 31'	Report
9 June 2013	(Iran) Shahid Dastgerdi Arena, Tehran	Uzbekistan	Friendly	9–3 W	Taheri 2', Javid 2' – 18', Tayyebi 6' – 16' – 21', Mortazavi 8', Bahadori 20', Vafaei 33'	Report
13 June 2013	(China) Zhejiang Dragon Sports Centre, Hangzhou	Russia	Friendly	5–1 W	Shafiei 2' – 19', Tayyebi 15' – 30', Hassanzadeh 25'	Report
14 June 2013	(China) Zhejiang Dragon Sports Centre, Hangzhou	Netherlands	Friendly	4–3 W	Shafiei 12' – 16', Hassanzadeh 20', Bahadori 25'	Report
15 June 2013	(China) Zhejiang Dragon Sports Centre, Hangzhou	China	Friendly	5–2 W	Mortazavi 12', Hassanzadeh 16', Taheri 24', Shafiei 30', Tayyebi 36'	Report
27 June 2013	(South Korea) Songdo Global University Campus, Incheon	United Arab Emirates	2013 Asian Indoor-Martial Arts Games	13–0 W	Taheri 3' – 3' – 24', Tayyebi 8' – 40' – 40', Javid 10' – 20' – 25', Kiaei 16', Hassanzadeh 20', Bahadori 21' – 40'	Report
1 July 2013	(South Korea) Songdo Global University Campus, Incheon	Iraq	2013 Asian Indoor-Martial Arts Games	12–3 W	Hassanzadeh 10' – 12', Shafiei 16' – 16', Kiaei 21' – 39', Taheri 24' – 30', Tayyebi 26' – 28', Vafaei 31', Bahadori 34'	Report
3 July 2013	(South Korea) Dongbu Student Gymnasium, Incheon	China	2013 Asian Indoor-Martial Arts Games	8–0 W	Bahadori 15', Hassanzadeh 20' – 28' – 30', Tayyebi 22' – 37', Khayyam 27', Javid 31'	Report
4 July 2013	(South Korea) Songdo Global University Campus, Incheon	Thailand	2013 Asian Indoor-Martial Arts Games	5–4 W	Tayyebi 5' – 7' – 25', Khayyam 20', Bahadori 34'	Report
6 July 2013	(South Korea) Songdo Global University Campus, Incheon	Japan	2013 Asian Indoor-Martial Arts Games	5–2 W	Vafaei 21', Tayyebi 23', Taheri 31', Hassanzadeh 37', Shafiei 38'	Report
21 October 2013	(Brazil) Ginásio Chico Neto, Maringá	Guatemala	Friendly	7–0 W	Fakhim 2, Tayyebi 2, Shafiei, Khayyam, Hassannejad	Report
22 October 2013	(Brazil) Ginásio Chico Neto, Maringá	Argentina	2013 Grand Prix de Futsal	2–2 D	Tavakoli 12', Shafiei 19'	Report
23 October 2013	(Brazil) Ginásio Chico Neto, Maringá	Japan	2013 Grand Prix de Futsal	3–1 W	Takita 2' (o.g.), Tayyebi 18', Asghari Moghaddam 38'	Report
24 October 2013	(Brazil) Ginásio Chico Neto, Maringá	Brazil	2013 Grand Prix de Futsal	2–7 L	Hassanzadeh 28', Bahadori 38'	Report
26 October 2013	(Brazil) Ginásio Chico Neto, Maringá	Russia	2013 Grand Prix de Futsal	2–4 L	Tayyebi 35', Bahadori 39'	Report
27 October 2013	(Brazil) Ginásio Chico Neto, Maringá	Paraguay	2013 Grand Prix de Futsal	6–2 W	Bahadori 4' – 5' – 26' – 36', Asghari Moghaddam 19', Fakhim 26'	Report
2 December 2013	(Iran) Shahediyeh Arena, Yazd	Russia	Friendly	6–3 W	Keshavarz 4' – 39', Bahadori 7', Taheri 33', Tayyebi 35', Esmaeilpour 38'	Report
3 December 2013	(Iran) Shahediyeh Arena, Yazd	Russia	Friendly	2–2 D	Tavakoli 14', Bahadori 31'	Report

=== 2014 ===
Date	Venue	Opponent	Competition	Result	Iranian scorers	Report
19 April 2014	Uzbekistan Sports Center, Tashkent	Uzbekistan	Friendly	6–1 W	Shajari 10', Fakhim 12', Khayyam 20', Shafiei 30' – 35', Vafaei 36'	Report
20 April 2014	Uzbekistan Sports Center, Tashkent	Uzbekistan	Friendly	6–2 W	Fakhim 13', Tavakoli 14', Vafaei 15', Javid 25', Esmaeilpour 32', Alighadr 34'	Report
30 April 2014	(Vietnam) Ton Duc Thang University Gymnasium, Ho Chi Minh City	Indonesia	2014 AFC Futsal Championship	5–1 W	Tayyebi 8', Tavakoli 17' – 17', Hassanzadeh 18', Shafiei 38'	Report
2 May 2014	(Vietnam) Ton Duc Thang University Gymnasium, Ho Chi Minh City	China	2014 AFC Futsal Championship	12–0 W	Hassanzadeh 1' – 2' – 25', Tayyebi 1' – 12' – 27' – 35', Tavakoli 5', Shafiei 10' – 28', Fakhim 24', Ahmadi 40'	Report
4 May 2014	(Vietnam) Phú Thọ Indoor Stadium, Ho Chi Minh City	Australia	2014 AFC Futsal Championship	8–1 W	Tayyebi 2' – 10' – 11', Taheri 10' – 29', Vafaei 15', Shafiei 17', Esmaeilpour 28'	Report
7 May 2014	(Vietnam) Phú Thọ Indoor Stadium, Ho Chi Minh City	Vietnam	2014 AFC Futsal Championship	15–4 W	Tayyebi 2' – 10' – 24', Fakhim 11' – 36' – 38', Esmaeilpour 12', Vafaei 17' – 36', Hassanzadeh 25' – 26' – 28', Shajari 29' – 32', Jafari 30'	Report
8 May 2014	(Vietnam) Phú Thọ Indoor Stadium, Ho Chi Minh City	Uzbekistan	2014 AFC Futsal Championship	10–0 W	Vafaei 1', Tayyebi 5' – 24' – 28', Shafiei 10' – 23' – 31', Hassanzadeh 5', Esmaeilpour 7', Shajari 30'	Report
10 May 2014	(Vietnam) Phú Thọ Indoor Stadium, Ho Chi Minh City	Japan	2014 AFC Futsal Championship	2(0) – 2(3) L	Fakhim 8', Tayyebi 43'	Report
11 November 2014	Brazil	Vietnam	Friendly	6–1 W	Orouji3, Javid2, Khayyam	Report
12 November 2014	(Brazil) Ginásio Poliesportivo Adib Moysés Dib, São Bernardo do Campo	Guatemala	2014 Grand Prix de Futsal	7–2 W	Tayyebi 07':26" – 08':17" – 10':00", Javid 11':27", Shajari 13':48", Hassanzadeh 23':12", Tavakoli 32':05"	Report
14 November 2014	(Brazil) Ginásio Poliesportivo Adib Moysés Dib, São Bernardo do Campo	Costa Rica	2014 Grand Prix de Futsal	5–1 W	Tayyebi 10':00" – 25':17", Esmaeilpour 28':46" – 30':00", Hassanzadeh 39':00"	Report
15 November 2014	(Brazil) Ginásio Poliesportivo Adib Moysés Dib, São Bernardo do Campo	Colombia	2014 Grand Prix de Futsal	3–4 L	Hassanzadeh 12':18" – 21':22", Tavakoli 21':00"	Report
16 November 2014	(Brazil) Ginásio Poliesportivo Adib Moysés Dib, São Bernardo do Campo	Guatemala	2014 Grand Prix de Futsal	10–4 W	Jafari 9':17" – 30':04", Hassanzadeh 9':32" – 13':04" – 35':03", Tayyebi 22':28" – 24':09" – 31':08" – 36':01", Khayyam 39':10"	Report
1 December 2014	(Iran) Shahid Heidarian Arena, Qom	Russia	Friendly	1–1 D	Vafaei 19'	Report
2 December 2014	(Iran) Shahid Heidarian Arena, Qom	Russia	Friendly	0–0 D	Non	Report

=== 2015 ===
Date	Venue	Opponent	Competition	Result	Iranian scorers	Report
6 January 2015	(Croatia) GŠSD, Pazin	Croatia	Friendly	4–1 W	Shafiei 1', Bahadori 22' – 28', Ebrahimi 25'	Report
7 January 2015	(Croatia) Športno društvo Novigrad, Novigrad	Croatia	Friendly	2–0 W	Sangsefidi 12', Ebrahimi 26'	Report
10 February 2015	(Slovenia) Kidričevo Sports Hall, Kidričevo	Slovenia	Friendly	4–2 W	Javid 3', Ahmadi 17', Tavakoli 29', Orouji 32'	Report
11 February 2015	(Slovenia) Tri Lilije Hall, Laško	Slovenia	Friendly	2–1 W	Esmaeilpour 7', Tavakoli 32'	Report
10 October 2015	(Iran) Ghadir Arena, Urmia	Russia	Friendly	3–1 W	Tayyebi 2', Ahmadi 5', Hassanzadeh 39'	Report
11 October 2015	(Iran) Ghadir Arena, Urmia	Russia	Friendly	2–2 D	Javid 29', Esmaeilpour 32'	Report
20 October 2015	(Italy) Estra Forum, Prato	Italy	Friendly	0–2 L	Non	Report
21 October 2015	(Italy) Estra Forum, Prato	Italy	Friendly	2–3 L	Ahmadi 9':30", Bahadori 18':18"	Report
4 November 2015	(Brazil) Centro Olímpico Engenheiro Wagner do Nascimento, Uberaba	Colombia	2015 Grand Prix de Futsal	4–1 W	Tayyebi 11' – 23', Hassanzadeh 20', Ahmadi 20'	Report
5 November 2015	(Brazil) Centro Olímpico Engenheiro Wagner do Nascimento, Uberaba	Angola	2015 Grand Prix de Futsal	7–0 W	Tavakoli2, Hassanzadeh2, Ahmadi, Esmaeilpour, Bahadori	Report
6 November 2015	(Brazil) Centro Olímpico Engenheiro Wagner do Nascimento, Uberaba	Uruguay	2015 Grand Prix de Futsal	7–3 W	Tayyebi 8', Tavakoli 13', Hassanzadeh 17' – 38', Hajibandeh 18', Javid 23', Taheri 36'	Report
7 November 2015	(Brazil) Centro Olímpico Engenheiro Wagner do Nascimento, Uberaba	Paraguay	2015 Grand Prix de Futsal	2–0 W	Javid 17', Hassanzadeh 38'	Report
8 November 2015	(Brazil) Centro Olímpico Engenheiro Wagner do Nascimento, Uberaba	Brazil	2015 Grand Prix de Futsal	3–4 L	Bahadori 7':05", Javid 29':27", Tayyebi 36':32"	Report
18 December 2015	(China) Changshu Sports Center, Changshu	Myanmar	Changshu International Tournament	15–2 W	Javid 4, Hassanzadeh 4, Safari 3, Vafaei, Kazemi, Kouhestani, Shajari	Report
19 December 2015	(China) Changshu Sports Center, Changshu	Mexico	Changshu International Tournament	5–1 W	Javid 2, Hassanzadeh, Safari, Kouhestani	Report
20 December 2015	(China) Changshu Sports Center, Changshu	China	Changshu International Tournament	3–3 D	Vafaei, Kazemi, Kouhestani	Report

=== 2016 ===
Date	Venue	Opponent	Competition	Result	Iranian scorers	Report
10 February 2016	(Uzbekistan) Universal Stadium, Tashkent	Jordan	2016 AFC Futsal Championship	6–0 W	Hassanzadeh 2' – 27', Tayyebi 10', Bahadori 31', Javid 34' – 36'	Report
12 February 2016	(Uzbekistan) Universal Stadium, Tashkent	China	2016 AFC Futsal Championship	7–0 W	Taheri 1', Hassanzadeh 6', Ahmadi 17', Keshavarz 26' – 28', Tayyebi 27', Bahadori 32'	Report
14 February 2016	Uzbekistan Stadium, Tashkent	Iraq	2016 AFC Futsal Championship	13–2 W	Taheri 1' – 10', Tayyebi 3' – 11' – 18' – 28', Hassanzadeh 5' – 40', Ahmadi 6', Javid 6' – 15' – 34', Tavakoli 20'	Report
17 February 2016	Uzbekistan Stadium, Tashkent	Kyrgyzstan	2016 AFC Futsal Championship	7–0 W	Tayyebi 7' – 15' – 32', Taheri 8', Hassanzadeh 26', Bahadori 26', Alighadr 29'	Report
19 February 2016	Uzbekistan Stadium, Tashkent	Vietnam	2016 AFC Futsal Championship	13–1 W	Javid 2' – 20' – 32', Tavakoli 8' – 8' – 20' – 22', Ahmadi 13', Tayyebi 16' – 27', Vafaei 26', Keshavarz 37' – 39'	Report
21 February 2016	Uzbekistan Stadium, Tashkent	Uzbekistan	2016 AFC Futsal Championship	2–1 W	Bahadori 9', Keshavarz 14'	Report
20 August 2016	(Thailand) Bangkok Arena, Bangkok	Kazakhstan	2016 Thailand Five's	3–3 D	Tavakoli 12', Alighadr 13', Javid 25'	Report
21 August 2016	(Thailand) Bangkok Arena, Bangkok	Thailand	2016 Thailand Five's	5–7 L	Esmaeilpour 1', Tavakoli 12', Sangsefidi 14', Javid 27', Alighadr 31'	Report
23 August 2016	(Thailand) Bangkok Arena, Bangkok	Japan	2016 Thailand Five's	4–2 W	Taheri 8' – 27', Tavakoli 7', Alighadr 17'	Report
28 August 2016	(Iran) Shahid Beheshti Arena, Mashhad	Uzbekistan	Friendly	3–0 W	Tavakoli 23', Taheri 26', Keshavarz 28'	Report
29 August 2016	(Iran) Shahid Beheshti Arena, Mashhad	Uzbekistan	Friendly	6–3 W	Tavakoli 2' – 40', Tayyebi 9' – 29', Bahadori 19', Javid 39'	Report
12 September 2016	(Colombia) Coliseo Iván de Beodut, Medellín	Spain	2016 FIFA Futsal World Cup	1–5 L	Hassanzadeh 27':12"	Report
15 September 2016	(Colombia) Coliseo Iván de Beodut, Medellín	Morocco	2016 FIFA Futsal World Cup	5–3 W	Tayyebi 9':49", Javid 14':54", Hassanzadeh 16':00" – 23':40", Tavakoli 17':03"	Report
18 September 2016	(Colombia) Coliseo Iván de Beodut, Medellín	Azerbaijan	2016 FIFA Futsal World Cup	3–3 D	Esmaeilpour 1':00", Tavakoli 20':31", Tayyebi 35':35"	Report
21 September 2016	(Colombia) Coliseo Bicentenario, Bucaramanga	Brazil	2016 FIFA Futsal World Cup	4 (3) – 4 (2) W	Tayyebi 13':52", Kazemi 30':55", Hassanzadeh 36':55", Keshavarz 47':34"	Report
24 September 2016	(Colombia) Coliseo Bicentenario, Bucaramanga	Paraguay	2016 FIFA Futsal World Cup	4–3 W	Esmaeilpour 15':33", 49':37", Javid 22':29", 35':35"	Report
27 September 2016	(Colombia) Coliseo Iván de Beodut, Medellín	Russia	2016 FIFA Futsal World Cup	3–4 L	Esmaeilpour 16':27", Hassanzadeh 29':12", Javid 39':49"	Report
1 October 2016	(Colombia) Coliseo El Pueblo, Cali	Portugal	2016 FIFA Futsal World Cup	2 (4) – 2 (3) W	Kazemi 25':29", Javid 35':39"	Report
5 December 2016	(Iran) Handball Federation Arena, Tehran	Russia	Friendly	6–4 W	Tayyebi 10' – 20' – 38', Hassanzadeh 20', Ahmadi 23', Sangsefidi 37'	Report
6 December 2016	(Iran) Handball Federation Arena, Tehran	Russia	Friendly	1–6 L	Tayyebi 16'	Report

=== 2017 ===
Date	Venue	Opponent	Competition	Result	Iranian scorers	Report
11 March 2017	(Iran) Azad university Arena, Shiraz	Iraq	Friendly	3–2 W	Ezzati 10', Bandi Saadi 19', Talebi 37'	Report
12 March 2017	(Iran) Azad university Arena, Shiraz	Iraq	Friendly	9–3 W	Askari Kohan 3', Shajari 6' – 29', Ezzati 8', Ahmadabbasi 12' – 15' – 19', Rafieipour 25', Amjad Kareem Hwede 30' (o.g.)	Report
3 April 2017	(Croatia) Sportskoj dvorani Osnovna škola Župa Dubrovačka, Župa dubrovačka	Croatia	Friendly	2–4 L	Shajari 28', Alighadr 40'	Report
4 April 2017	(Croatia) Sportskoj dvorani Osnovna škola Župa Dubrovačka, Župa dubrovačka	Croatia	Friendly	1–1 D	Bahadori 8'	Report
18 September 2017	(Turkmenistan) Ice Palace Hall 2, Ashgabat	Tahiti	Asian Indoor Games	16–1 W	Javid 16' – 27' – 30' – 36', Tavakoli 4' – 13' – 13', Esmaeilpour 8' – 10' – 17', Shajari 31' – 31', Ahmadabbasi 11', Hassanzadeh 33', Tayyebi 35', Ahmadi 39'	Report
19 September 2017	(Turkmenistan) Ice Palace Hall 2, Ashgabat	Jordan	Asian Indoor Games	7–3 W	Javid 20' – 27' – 33', Esmaeilpour 3' – 22', Orouji 5', Tayyebi 16'	Report
21 September 2017	(Turkmenistan) Ice Palace Hall 2, Ashgabat	Kyrgyzstan	Asian Indoor Games	10–0 W	Ahmadabbasi 9' – 11' – 18' – 23' – 32', Tavakoli 17' – 24' – 34', Kadyrov 27' (o.g.), Esmaeilpour 39'	Report
23 September 2017	(Turkmenistan) Ice Palace Hall 1, Ashgabat	Thailand	Asian Indoor Games	10–4 W	Tayyebi 18' – 24' – 29', Sangsefidi 5', Orouji 12', Esmaeilpour 14', Hassanzadeh 18', Tavakoli 19', Oladghobad 28', Javid 29'	Report
24 September 2017	(Turkmenistan) Ice Palace Hall 1, Ashgabat	Afghanistan	Asian Indoor Games	8–2 W	Javid 14' – 36' – 37', Esmaeilpour 4', Orouji 5', Tayyebi 8', Ahmadabbasi 12', Ahmadi 14'	Report
26 September 2017	(Turkmenistan) Ice Palace Hall 1, Ashgabat	Uzbekistan	Asian Indoor Games	7–1 W	Javid 4' – 9' – 32' – 36', Hassanzadeh 21' – 37', Ahmadi 31'	Report
15 October 2017	(Iran) Shahid Poursharifi, Tabriz	Afghanistan	AFC Futsal qualification	8–2 W	Javid 2' – 18' – 28', Hassanzadeh 6' – 7' – 29', Talebi 15', Ahmadabbasi 19'	Report
17 October 2017	(Iran) Shahid Poursharifi, Tabriz	Tajikistan	AFC Futsal qualification	12–2 W	Tavakoli 3' – 4', Orouji 6', Alighadr 17' – 18' – 31', Javid 18' – 18', Lotfi 19', Talebi 30', Ahmadabbasi 34', Hassanzadeh 39'	Report
3 December 2017	(Iran) 25 Aban Arena, Isfahan	Azerbaijan	Caspian Cup 2017	3–3 D	Hassanzadeh 3', Tayyebi 3', Shajari 39'	Report
4 December 2017	(Iran) 25 Aban Arena, Isfahan	Kazakhstan	Caspian Cup 2017	2–1 W	Tayyebi 4', Esmaeilpour 40'	Report
6 December 2017	(Iran) 25 Aban Arena, Isfahan	Russia	Caspian Cup 2017	4–0 W	Javid 19' – 29', Rafieipour 32', Shajari 38'	Report

=== 2018 ===
Date	Venue	Opponent	Competition	Result	Iranian scorers	Report
14 January 2018	(Iran) Handball Federation Arena, Tehran	Belarus	Friendly	5–0 W	Esmaeilpour 10', Orouji 15', Tavakoli 16', Hassanzadeh 30', Alighadr 33'	Report
15 January 2018	(Iran) Handball Federation Arena, Tehran	Belarus	Friendly	2–1 W	Esmaeilpour 8', Hassanzadeh 11'	Report
23 January 2018	(Azerbaijan) Baku Sports Hall, Baku	Azerbaijan	Friendly	3–3 D	Alighadr 8', Tayyebi 20', Javid 35'	Report
24 January 2018	(Azerbaijan) Baku Sports Hall, Baku	Azerbaijan	Friendly	4–1 W	Tayyebi 12', Orouji 16', Oladghobad 32', Tavakoli 36'	Report
2 February 2018	(Taiwan) University of Taipei Gymnasium, Taipei	Myanmar	2018 AFC Futsal Championship	14–0 W	Javid 1' – 8' – 22' – 31', Hassanzadeh 1' – 4' – 8' – 39', Tayyebi 6' – 8' – 15', Alighadr 7', Ahmadabbasi 35', Oladghobad 37'	Report
4 February 2018	(Taiwan) University of Taipei Gymnasium, Taipei	China	2018 AFC Futsal Championship	11–1 W	Tayyebi 3' – 14' – 37', Tavakoli 10' – 27', Javid 10' – 14', Shajari 14', Hassanzadeh 21' – 24', Esmaeilpour 24'	Report
6 February 2018	(Taiwan) University of Taipei Gymnasium, Taipei	Iraq	2018 AFC Futsal Championship	5–3 W	Tayyebi 8' – 38', Hassanzadeh 12', Oladghobad 26', Tavakoli 31'	Report
8 February 2018	(Taiwan) Xinzhuang Gymnasium, New Taipei City	Thailand	2018 AFC Futsal Championship	9–1 W	Esmaeilpour 1' – 3', Hassanzadeh 4', Tayyebi 5' – 16' – 36', Javid 21', Shajari 24' – 35'	Report
9 February 2018	(Taiwan) Xinzhuang Gymnasium, New Taipei City	Uzbekistan	2018 AFC Futsal Championship	7–1 W	Javid 2' – 15' – 16', Hassanzadeh 3' – 30', Tayyebi 10' – 34'	Report
11 February 2018	(Taiwan) Xinzhuang Gymnasium, New Taipei City	Japan	2018 AFC Futsal Championship	4–0 W	Hassanzadeh 19' – 28', Tavakoli 21', Tayyebi 39'	Report
23 September 2018	(Iran) Shahid Poursharifi, Tabriz	Belarus	Tabriz 2018	3–1 W	Ahmadabbasi, Sangsefidi, Javid	Report
24 September 2018	(Iran) Shahid Poursharifi, Tabriz	Japan	Tabriz 2018	3–3 D	Javid 2', Orouji 26', Shajari	Report
26 September 2018	(Iran) Shahid Poursharifi, Tabriz	Ukraine	Tabriz 2018	2–1 W	Oladghobad, Javid	Report
4 December 2018	(Slovakia) Hant Arena, Bratislava	Russia	Slovak Futsal Week 2018	5–4 W	Hassanzadeh3, Javid, Orouji	Report
5 December 2018	(Slovakia) Hant Arena, Bratislava	Slovakia	Slovak Futsal Week 2018	0–0 D	Non	Report

=== 2019 ===
Date	Venue	Opponent	Competition	Result	Iranian scorers	Report
4 February 2019	(Serbia) Sportski centar Lagator, Loznica	Serbia	Friendly	6–3 W	Ahmadabbasi 7' – 30' – 38', Tayyebi 12', Shajari 14', Oladghobad 28'	Report
5 February 2019	(Serbia) Hala Sportova Zorka, Šabac	Serbia	Friendly	4–3 W	Tayyebi 19' – 24', Rajčević 3' (o.g.), Hassanzadeh 10'	Report
22 September 2019	(Russia) Zvozdnyy, Astrakhan	Kazakhstan	Caspian Cup	2–1 W	Hassanzadeh 10', Tavakoli 11'	Report
23 September 2019	(Russia) Zvozdnyy, Astrakhan	Azerbaijan	Caspian Cup	2–2 D	Javid 21', Orouji 34'	Report
25 September 2019	(Russia) Zvozdnyy, Astrakhan	Russia	Caspian Cup	3–9 L	Esmaeilpour 15', Orouji 36', Azimi 38'	Report
23 October 2019	(Iran) Ghadir Arena, Urmia	Turkmenistan	AFC Futsal Championship 2020 qualification	4–0 W	Hassanzadeh 3', Javid 18', Sähedow 27' (o.g.), Karimi 34'	Report
25 October 2019	(Iran) Ghadir Arena, Urmia	Kyrgyzstan	AFC Futsal Championship 2020 qualification	8–3 W	Javid 13' – 18' – 39', Karimi 10' – 32', Ahmadi 2', Hassanzadeh 7', Nematian 15'	Report
1 December 2019	(Iran) Shahid Beheshti Arena, Mashhad	Slovakia	Mashhad Cup	5–5 D	Sangsefidi2, Ahmadi, Tavakoli, Ahmadabbasi	Report
3 September 2019	(Iran) Shahid Beheshti Arena, Mashhad	Belarus	Mashhad Cup	2–3 L	Javid, Hassanzadeh	Report
4 September 2019	(Iran) Shahid Beheshti Arena, Mashhad	Slovakia	Mashhad Cup	6–3 W	Bahadori3, Tayyebi2, Karimi	Report

=== Results by year ===
Year	Pld	W	D	L	GF	GA	GD
2010	19	14	3	2	105	41	+64
2011	18	9	3	6	67	40	+27
2012	24	15	5	4	115	40	+75
2013	20	14	4	2	108	46	+62
2014	15	11	3	1	96	24	+72
2015	16	11	2	3	65	26	+39
2016	20	12	4	4	98	53	+45
2017	15	12	2	1	102	29	+73
2018	15	12	3	0	77	21	+56
2019	10	6	2	2	42	32	+10
Total	172	116	31	25	875	352	+523

== 2020s ==
=== 2020 ===
Date	Venue	Opponent	Competition	Result	Iranian scorers	Report
7 October 2020	Uzbekistan Stadium, Tashkent	Uzbekistan	Friendly	2–1 W	Nematian 9', Ebrahimi 13'	Report
9 October 2020	Uzbekistan Stadium, Tashkent	Uzbekistan	Friendly	3–2 W	Ebrahimi 9', Anorov 19' (o.g.), Karimi 23'	Report

=== 2021 ===
Date	Venue	Opponent	Competition	Result	Iranian scorers	Report
25 July 2021		Lithuania	Continental Futsal Championship	5–0 W	Ahmadabbasi2, Javid2, Hassanzadeh	
26 July 2021		Tajikistan	Continental Futsal Championship	7–0 W	Javid3, Tayyebi, Sangsefidi, Tavakoli, Ahmadabbasi	
27 July 2021		Egypt	Continental Futsal Championship	2–2 D	Ahmadabbasi, Javid	
29 July 2021		Uzbekistan	Continental Futsal Championship	7–5 W	Tavakoli2, Ahmadabbasi2, Azimi, Hassanzadeh, Javid	
30 July 2021		Thailand	Continental Futsal Championship	5–1 W	Azimi2, Rafieipour2, Tavakoli	
30 August 2021		Belarus	Friendly	8–2 W	Ahmadabbasi2, Hassanzadeh2, Tayyebi, Ahmadi, Esmaeilpour, Parkas	
31 August 2021		Belarus	Friendly	5–1 W	Ahmadabbasi2, Oladghobad2, Tavakoli	
14 September 2021	Avia Solutions Group Arena, Vilnius	Serbia	2021 FIFA Futsal World Cup	3–2 W	Ahmadi 4', Fakhim 4', Esmaeilpour 37'	Report (FIFA)
17 September 2021	Avia Solutions Group Arena, Vilnius	United States	2021 FIFA Futsal World Cup	4–2 W	Tavakoli 3', Javid 7', Esmaeilpour 10', Ahmadabbasi 39'	Report (FIFA)
20 September 2021	Avia Solutions Group Arena, Vilnius	Argentina	2021 FIFA Futsal World Cup	1–2 L	Hassanzadeh 30'	Report (FIFA)
24 September 2021	Avia Solutions Group Arena, Vilnius	Uzbekistan	2021 FIFA Futsal World Cup	9–8 W	Hassanzadeh 1' 28', Javid 5' 25', Ahmadabbasi 16' 22' 37', Tavakoli 18', Oladghobad 30'	Report (FIFA)
27 September 2021	Žalgiris Arena, Kaunas	Kazakhstan	2021 FIFA Futsal World Cup	2–3 L	Oladghobad 8', Esmaeilpour 15'	Report (FIFA)
20 December 2021	Emilia Romagna Arena, Salsomaggiore Terme	Italy	Friendly	6–4 W	Karimi 2' – 12' – 22', Shajari 26', Tayyebi 34', Ahmadabbasi 40'	Report (NAZIONALI)
21 December 2021	Emilia Romagna Arena, Salsomaggiore Terme	Italy	Friendly	3–4 L	Ahmadabbasi 19' – 20' – 37'	Report (NAZIONALI)

=== 2022 ===
Date	Venue	Opponent	Competition	Result	Iranian scorers	Report
28 March 2022		Afghanistan	Friendly	2–2 D	Kadkhodaei, Ahmadabbasi	
10 April 2022	Gazprom Sports Complex, Bishkek	Maldives	2022 AFC Futsal Asian Cup qualification	17–0 W	Aghapour 5' – 15', Derakhshani 6', Tayyebi 11' – 25' – 26', Karimi 20', Ahmadabbasi 20' – 20' – 23' – 33' – 33', Kadkhodaei 34' – 35', Yousef 37' – 37', Rafieipour 38'	
11 April 2022	Gazprom Sports Complex, Bishkek	Turkmenistan	2022 AFC Futsal Asian Cup qualification	3–0 W	Tayyebi 12', Ahmadabbasi 20', Baýramdurdyýew 38' (o.g.)	
12 April 2022	Gazprom Sports Complex, Bishkek	Kyrgyzstan	2022 AFC Futsal Asian Cup qualification	8–1 W	Tayyebi 14', Ezzati 14', Rafieipour 30' – 31', Derakhshani 34', Kadkhodaei 36', Abbasi 37', Yousef 40'	
11 September 2022	Indoor Stadium Huamark, Bangkok	Finland	Continental Futsal Championship	2–1 W	Aghapour, Oladghobad	
13 September 2022	Indoor Stadium Huamark, Bangkok	Vietnam	Continental Futsal Championship	3–1 W	Javan2, Karimi	
15 September 2022	Indoor Stadium Huamark, Bangkok	Thailand	Continental Futsal Championship	3–2 W	Derakhshani, Ahmadabbasi, Aghapour	
16 September 2022	Indoor Stadium Huamark, Bangkok	Morocco	Continental Futsal Championship	3–4 L	Ahmadabbasi, Tayyebi2	
28 September 2022	Saad Al Abdullah Hall, Kuwait City	Indonesia	2022 AFC Futsal Asian Cup	5–0 W	Ahmadabbasi 2' – 22' ,Oladghobad 2' ,Asadshir 9' ,Tayyebi 24'	Report (AFC)
30 September 2022	Saad Al Abdullah Hall, Kuwait City	Chinese Taipei	2022 AFC Futsal Asian Cup	10–1 W	Bazyar 2' ,Tayyebi 3' – 16' – 36' ,Ahmadabbasi 4' – 16' – 18' ,Aghapour 22' ,Javan 28' ,Karimi 35'	Report (AFC)
2 October 2022	Saad Al Abdullah Hall, Kuwait City	Lebanon	2022 AFC Futsal Asian Cup	9–0 W	Aghapour 8' – 32' ,Tayyebi 17' – 39' ,Rhyem 17' (o.g.), Oladghobad 19' ,Jafari 21' ,Karimi 28' ,Bazyar 27'	Report (AFC)
4 October 2022	Saad Al Abdullah Hall, Kuwait City	Vietnam	2022 AFC Futsal Asian Cup - Quarterfinals	8–1 W		Report (AFC)
6 October 2022	Saad Al Abdullah Hall, Kuwait City	Thailand	2022 AFC Futsal Asian Cup - Semifinal	5–0 W		Report (AFC)
8 October 2022	Saad Al Abdullah Hall, Kuwait City	Japan	2022 AFC Futsal Asian Cup - Final	2–3 W		Report (AFC)

=== 2023 ===
Date	Venue	Opponent	Competition	Result	Iranian scorers	Report
1 March 2023	Pattaya City, Thailand	Saudi Arabia	NSDF Futsal Championship 2023	11–0 W		Report (AFC)
3 March 2023	Pattaya City, Thailand	Egypt	NSDF Futsal Championship 2023	3–1 W		Report (AFC)
5 March 2023	Pattaya City, Thailand	Thailand	NSDF Futsal Championship 2023	5–1 W		Report (AFC)
7 March 2023	Pattaya City, Thailand	Japan	NSDF Futsal Championship 2023	4–1 W		Report (AFC)
16 April 2023	Tehran, Irán	Uzbekistan	Friendly	5–3 W		Report (AFC)
18 April 2023	Tehran, Irán	Uzbekistan	Friendly	8–1 W		Report (AFC)
23 July 2023	Dushanbe, Tajikistan	Turkmenistan	CAFA Futsal Championship 2023	1–2 W		Report (AFC)
24 July 2023	Dushanbe, Tajikistan	Kyrgyzstan	CAFA Futsal Championship 2023	1–0 W		Report (AFC)
26 July 2023	Dushanbe, Tajikistan	Afghanistan	CAFA Futsal Championship 2023	5–1 W		Report (AFC)
28 July 2023	Dushanbe, Tajikistan	Uzbekistan	CAFA Futsal Championship 2023	5–0 W		Report (AFC)
30 July 2023	Dushanbe, Tajikistan	Tajikistan	CAFA Futsal Championship 2023	1–0 W		Report (AFC)
13 September 2023	Sorocaba, Brazil	Paraguay	Copa das Nações 2023	2–1 W		Report (AFC)
15 September 2023	Sorocaba, Brazil	Colombia	Copa das Nações 2023	2–0 W		Report (AFC)
16 September 2023	Sorocaba, Brazil	Japan	Copa das Nações 2023	2–0 W		Report (AFC)
17 September 2023	Sorocaba, Brazil	Brazil	Copa das Nações 2023	2–4 W		Report (AFC)
07 October 2023	Bishkek, Kyrgyz Republic	Maldives	AFC Futsal Asian Cup - Thailand 2024	18–2 W		Report (AFC)
09 October 2023	Bishkek, Kyrgyz Republic	Kyrgyzstan	AFC Futsal Asian Cup - Thailand 2024	10–2 W		Report (AFC)
11 October 2023	Bishkek, Kyrgyz Republic	Lebanon	AFC Futsal Asian Cup - Thailand 2024	6–0 W		Report (AFC)
18 December 2023	IRN	Russia	Friendly	3–2 W		Report (AFC)
20 December 2023	IRN	Russia	Friendly	2–6 L		Report (AFC)

=== 2024 ===
Date	Venue	Opponent	Competition	Result	Iranian scorers	Report
28 March 2024	Ho Chi Minh City, Vietnam	Morocco	Torneio 4 Nações Vietname 2024	4–5 L		[ ()]
30 March 2024	Ho Chi Minh City, Vietnam	New Zealand	Torneio 4 Nações Vietname 2024	5–1 W		[ ()]
31 March 2024	Ho Chi Minh City, Vietnam	Vietnam	Torneio 4 Nações Vietname 2024	3–1 W		[ ()]
18 April 2024	Bangkok, Thailand	Afghanistan	AFC Futsal Asian Cup 2024	3–1 W		[ ()]
20 April 2024	Bangkok, Thailand	Bahrain	AFC Futsal Asian Cup 2024	5–3 W		[ ()]
22 April 2024	Bangkok, Thailsnd	Kuwait	AFC Futsal Asian Cup 2024	4–0 W		[ ()]
24 April 2024	Bangkok, Thailand	Kyrgyzstan	AFC Futsal Asian Cup 2024	6–1 W		[ ()]
26 April 2024	Bangkok, Thailand	Uzbekistan	AFC Futsal Asian Cup 2024	3–3 p (5–4) W		[ ()]
28 April 2024	Bangkok, Thailand	Thailand	AFC Futsal Asian Cup 2024	4–1 W		[ ()]
30 August 2024	Astaneh, Kazakhstan	Kazakhstan	Friendly	1–4 L		[ ()]
01 September 2024	Astaneh, Kazakhstan	Kazakhstan	Friendly	1–1 D		[ ()]
16 September 2024	Bukhara, Uzbekistan	Venezuela	FIFA Futsal World Cup 2024	7–1 W		[ ()]
19 September 2024	Bukhara, Uzbekistan	Guatemala	FIFA Futsal World Cup 2024	9–4 W		[ ()]
22 September 2024	Bukhara, Uzbekistan	France	FIFA Futsal World Cup 2024	4–1 W		[ ()]
26 September 2024	Bukhara, Uzbekistan	Morocco	FIFA Futsal World Cup 2024	3–4 L		[ ()]

=== 2025 ===
Date	Venue	Opponent	Competition	Result	Iranian scorers	Report
06 March 2025	Paraná, Brazil	Brazil	Copa Intercontinental de Seleções	2–5 L		[ ()]
07 March 2025	Paraná, Brazil	Greenland	Copa Intercontinental de Seleções	11–2 W		[ ()]
08 March 2025	Paraná, Brazil	Afghanistan	Copa Intercontinental de Seleções	4–3 W		[ ()]
09 March 2025	Paraná, Brazil	Brazil	Copa Intercontinental de Seleções	0–3 L		[ ()]
09 April 2025	Nakhon Ratchasima, Thailand	Russia	SAT Futsal Championship 2025	1–2 L		[ ()]
10 April 2025	Nakhon Ratchasima, Thailand	Kuwait	SAT Futsal Championship 2025	5–0 W		[ ()]
12 April 2025	Nakhon Ratchasima, Thailand	Thailand	SAT Futsal Championship 2025	6–2 W		[ ()]
20 September 2025		Bangladesh	AFC Asian Cup (Q) 2026	12–0 W		[ ()]
22 September 2025		United Arab Emirates	AFC Asian Cup (Q) 2026	10–0 W		[ ()]
24 September 2025		Malaysia	AFC Asian Cup (Q) 2026	4–0 W		[ ()]
16 October 2025		Russia	Friendly	1–1 D		[ ()]
18 October 2025		Russia	Friendly	5–2 L		[ ()]
04 November 2025		Morocco	Islamic Solidarity Games 2025	2–2 D		[ ()]
06 November 2025		Afghanistan	Islamic Solidarity Games 2025	2–2 D		[ ()]
08 November 2025		Tajikistan	Islamic Solidarity Games 2025	4–1 W		[ ()]
11 November 2025		Morocco	Islamic Solidarity Games 2025	5–0 W		[ ()]

=== 2026 ===
Date	Venue	Opponent	Competition	Result	Iranian scorers	Report
28 january 2026		Malaysia	AFC Futsal Asian Cup 2026	4–1 W		[ ()]
30 JANUARY 2026		Saudi Arabia	AFC Futsal Asian Cup 2026	2–0 W		[ ()]
01 February 2026		Afghanistan	AFC Futsal Asian Cup 2026	5–2 W		[ ()]
03 February 2026		Uzbekistan	AFC Futsal Asian Cup 2026	7–4 W		[ ()]
05 February 2026		Iraq	AFC Futsal Asian Cup 2026	4–2 W		[ ()]
07 February 2026		Indonesia	AFC Futsal Asian Cup 2026 Final	5–5 D		[ ()]

=== Results by year ===
Year	Pld	W	D	L	GF	GA	GD
2020	2	2	0	0	5	3	+2
2021	14	10	1	3	67	36	+31
2022	14	11	1	2	80	16	+64
2023	20	17	0	3	96	25	+71
2024	7	6	0	1	30	12	+18
2025	0	0	0	0	0	0	+0
2026	0	0	0	0	0	0	+0
Total	57	46	2	9	252	85	+167

== Note ==
- 1995 UAE Tournament not record complete
- 2000 in Rio de Janeiro Four Nations Cup Iran 4-1 Belgium not record
- 2013 Victory Day Women Cup Hungary vs Iran 2 – 2 (women mach record in men results)
- Some U21 and U23 match record in Senior team results (two match in 2011 : Iran vs Russia 3 – 0 and Iran vs Russia 1 – 2 in U21 not Senior national team)
- futsal planet not record goals in extra time and record draw but win in extra time should be record win and win in penalty kicks should be record draw)
- Iran 20-2 Armenia in 2003 Tehran cup but record 10–2 in futsal planet.
- some of match between Iran U21 and other national A team but because of lack of power source like to futsal planet we count this matches in friendly and total results table in this page:
  - 2007 Iran u21 2-1 Thailand national team
  - 2007 Iran u21 2-2 Thailand national team
  - 2009 Iran u21 4-3 Thailand national team ( Kiaei2, M. Tayebi, Sharifzadeh )
  - 2009 Iran u21 1-6 Thailand national team
  - 2009 Iran u23 7-0 Kyrgyzstan national team ( Hassanzadeh3, Daneshvar2, Esmaeilpour, Javid )
  - 2009 Iran u23 3-1 Uzbekistan national team
  - 2010 Iran u21 0-4 Uzbekistan national team
