= Ali Akbar Yousefi =

Ali Akbar Yousefi may refer to:

- Ali Akbar Yousefi (footballer)
- Ali Akbar Yousefi (wrestler)
