= Saeid Rajabi =

Saeid Rajabi may refer to:

- Saeid Rajabi (futsal) (born 1965), Iranian futsal player
- Saeid Rajabi (taekwondo) (born 1996), Iranian taekwondo competitor
