= Majid Tikdarinejad =

Iranian futsal player

Personal information
- Full name: Majid Hossein Tikdarinejad
- Date of birth: September 6, 1982 (age 44)
- Place of birth: Kerman, Iran

Youth career
- Shahrdari Kerman

Senior career*
Years	Team	Apps	(Gls)
- Fajr Kerman
- Pas
- Esteghlal
2006	Sazman Bazargani A. Sharghi		
2006–2009	Tam Iran Khodro		
2009–2012	Shahid Mansouri		
2012–2013	Shahrdari Tabriz	21	(2)
2013–2014	Giti Pasand		(1)
2014–2016	Bank Resalat		
2015	→ Lokomotiv Tashkent (loan)	2	(0)

International career^{‡}
–2012	Iran		
- * Club domestic league appearances and goals as of 21 January 2022 ‡ National team caps and goals as of 1 January 2022

Majid Hossein Tikdarinejad (Persian: مجید حسین تیکدری‌نژاد; born 6 September 1982) is an Iranian professional futsal player.

== Honours ==
=== Country ===
- AFC Futsal Championship
  - Champion (1): 2005
- Asian Indoor Games
  - Champion (1): 2005
- Confederations Cup
  - Champion (1): 2009
- WAFF Futsal Championship
  - Champion (1): 2012

=== Club ===
- AFC Futsal Club Championship
  - Runners-up (1): 2011 (Shahid Mansouri)
- Iranian Futsal Super League
  - Champion (2): 2010–11 (Shahid Mansouri) - 2011–12 (Shahid Mansouri)
  - Runners-up (1): 2013-14 (Giti Pasand)
