= Saeid Abdollahnejad =

Iranian futsal player and coach (born 1973)

Personal information
- Full name: Saeid Abdollahnejad
- Date of birth: 7 October 1973 (age 53)
- Place of birth: Tehran, Iran
- Position: Defender

Youth career
- Esteghlal (football)
- Persepolis (football)

Senior career*
Years	Team	Apps	(Gls)
- Fath (football)
- Poora (football)
- Farid Karaj
- Shensa
- Persepolis
- Esteghlal

International career^{‡}
- Iran U17
2000–2004	Iran		

Managerial career
- 2003–2004: Persepolis
- 2007: Esteghlal
- 2009–2010: Persepolis (assistant)
- 2010–2011: Dabiri (assistant)
- * Club domestic league appearances and goals as of 19 September 2022 ‡ National team caps and goals as of 19 September 2022

Saeid Abdollahnejad (Persian: سعید عبدالله نژاد; born 7 October 1973) is an Iranian professional futsal coach and former player.
