= Ali Sanei =

Iranian futsal player (born 1973)

Ali Saneei
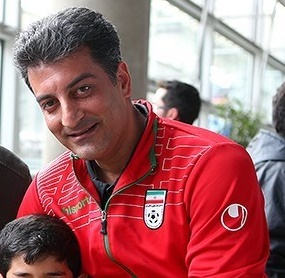

Personal information
- Full name: Ali Saneei Arani
- Date of birth: 28 June 1973 (age 53)
- Place of birth: Aran o Bidgol, Iran
- Position: Defender

Team information
- Current team: Iran U20 (manager)

Youth career
- 1990–1991: Keshtirani (football)

Senior career*
Years	Team	Apps	(Gls)
1994–1997	Shemiran (football)		
1997–2000	Atashneshani (football)		
2000–2001	Hesa		
2001–2005	Pas		
2005–2008	Azad University		

International career^{‡}
1999–2004	Iran	72	(36)

Managerial career
- 2005–2006: Azad University
- 2006–2011: Iran (assistant)
- 2011–2013: Iran
- 2013–2014: Tasisat Daryaei
- 2015–2016: Iran (technical manager)
- 2016–: Iran U20
- * Club domestic league appearances and goals as of 21 August 2022 ‡ National team caps and goals as of 10 January 2022

Ali Saneei Arani (Persian: علی صانعی آرانی; born 28 June 1973) is an Iranian professional futsal coach and former player. He is currently head coach of Iran national under-20 futsal team. He was the head coach of Iran national futsal team from 2011 to 2012. During his term as the head coach Iran did not perform well, resulting in the loss of Asian title in 2012, an early exit from the Futsal World Cup 2012 held in Thailand, and a drop in the world ranking from 4th place to 7th. He was sacked in Nov. 2012 just after the World Cup.

== Honours ==
=== Country ===
- AFC Futsal Championship
  - Champion (5): 1999 – 2000 – 2001 – 2002 – 2003

=== Club ===
- Iranian Futsal Super League
  - Champion (1): 2002–03 (Pas)
  - Runner-Up (2): 2000–01 (Hesa) – 2001–02 (Pas)
- Tehran Football Competitions
  - Champion (1): 1999–2000 (Atashneshani)

=== Managerial ===
- WAFF Futsal Championship
  - Champion (1): 2012
- AFC U-20 Futsal Championship
  - Champion (1): 2017
