= Sadegh Varmazyar =

Iranian footballer

Sadegh Varmazyar صادق ورمزیار
Personal information
- Full name: Sadegh Varmazyar
- Date of birth: March 21, 1966 (age 60)
- Place of birth: Malayer, Iran
- Position: Defender

Senior career*
| Years | Team | Apps | (Gls) |
| 1984–1997 | Esteghlal | 271 | (16) |

International career
| 1990–1996 | Iran | 15 | (0) |

Managerial career
- 2000–2004: Elmo Adab Mashhad
- 2007–2008: Esteghlal (assistant)
- 2008–2009: Saba Qom (assistant)
- 2016–2018: Esteghlal (academy director)
- * Club domestic league appearances and goals

Sadegh Varmazyar (Persian: صادق ورمزیار; born 1966) is an Iranian retired football defender who played for Iran national football team and Esteghlal FC. He also played for Iran national futsal team in the 1992 FIFA Futsal World Championship and 1996 FIFA Futsal World Championship.

== Honours ==
=== National ===
- FIFA Futsal World Cup

Fourth place: 1

1992

=== Club ===
- Asian Champions League

Winner: 1

1990–91 with Esteghlal FC

Runner up: 1

1991–92 with Esteghlal FC

- Qods League

Winner: 1

1989–90 with Esteghlal FC

- Azadegan League

Runner up: 2

1991–92 with Esteghlal FC
1994–95 with Esteghlal FC

Third Place: 1

1995–96 with Esteghlal FC

- Tehran Football League

Winner: 1

1984–85 with Esteghlal FC

Runner up: 1

1989–90 with Esteghlal FC
1990–91 with Esteghlal FC

Third Place: 2

1988–89 with Esteghlal FC
1986–87 with Esteghlal FC

- Iran Hazfi Cup

Winner: 1

1995–96 with Esteghlal FC

Runner up: 1

1990–91 with Esteghlal FC
