= Esteghlal FSC =

Iranian futsal club

Esteghlal Tehran FSC
- Full name: Esteghlal Tehran Futsal Club
- Founded: 1998
- Owner: Persian Gulf Holding
- Chairman: Ali Tajernia
- Manager: Mohammad Khodadadi
- League: Iranian Futsal Super League
- Website: fcesteghlal.ir

Esteghlal Futsal Club (Persian: باشگاه فوتسال استقلال) was an Iranian futsal club based in Tehran, Iran. Esteghlal was the champion of the Premiere Futsal League in 2001 and 2002.

== background ==
Esteghlal Club launched its futsal team in 1998 and immediately achieved success in the Iranian Futsal Premier League; the team won two championships (1990 and 1999) and two runner-up finishes in these competitions. In the 1990s, stars such as Mohammad Reza Heydarian, Siamak Dadashi, and Amir and Vahid Shamsaei were part of the team. However, in 2008, due to administrative problems, including the failure to submit the list of players on time, Esteghlal Futsal team was removed from the Premier League and effectively disbanded.[7][8] After an 18-year hiatus, Esteghlal Club officially revived its men's futsal in October 2005 and participated in the Iranian Men's Futsal League One.[9][10]

== Honours ==
National

- Premiere Futsal League
  - Champions (2): 2000–2001, 2001–02
  - Runners-up (1): 2002–03

== Season-by-season ==
The table below chronicles the achievements of the Club in various competitions.

Season	League	Position	Notes
2000–01	Premiere Futsal League	1st
2001–02	Premiere Futsal League	1st
2002–03	Premiere Futsal League	2nd
2003–04	Futsal Super League	7th
2004–05	Futsal Super League	12th
2005–06	Futsal Super League	11th
2007–08	Futsal Super League	9th
2008–09	Futsal Super League		disqualification from the league before the beginning

== Managers ==
(Iran) Ahmad Taheri
(Iran) Mohammad Reza Heidarian

== Player ==
=== World Cup players ===
(Guatemala) World Cup 2000

- (Iran) Mohammad Reza Heidarian
- (Iran) Mojtaba Moeini
- (Iran) Babak Masoumi

(Chinese Taipei) World Cup 2004

- (Iran) Mohammad Hashemzadeh
- (Iran) Kazem Sadeghi

=== Notable players ===
- (Iran) Ahmad Baghbanbashi
- (Iran) Siamak Dadashi
- (Iran) Mohammad Hashemzadeh
- (Iran) Mohammad Reza Heidarian
- (Iran) Babak Masoumi
- (Iran) Kazem Mohammadi
- (Iran) Reza Nasseri
- (Iran) Amir Shamsaei
- (Iran) Vahid Shamsaei
- (Iran) Mostafa Nazari

== See also ==
- Esteghlal Tehran Football Club
