= 2000 AFC Futsal Championship =

ฟุตซอลชิงแชมป์เอเชีย 2000

Tournament details
- Host country: Thailand
- Dates: 5–12 May
- Teams: 9 (from 1 confederation)
- Venue: 1 (in 1 host city)

Final positions
- Champions: Iran (2nd title)
- Runners-up: Kazakhstan
- Third place: Thailand
- Fourth place: Japan

Tournament statistics
- Matches played: 20
- Goals scored: 223 (11.15 per match)
- Top scorer: (Thailand) Therdsak Chaiman (11 goals)

The 2000 AFC Futsal Championship was held in Bangkok, Thailand from 5 to 12 May 2000. The tournament acted as a qualifying tournament for the 2000 FIFA Futsal World Championship in Guatemala.

== Venue ==
Bangkok
Nimibutr Indoor Stadium
Capacity: 5,600
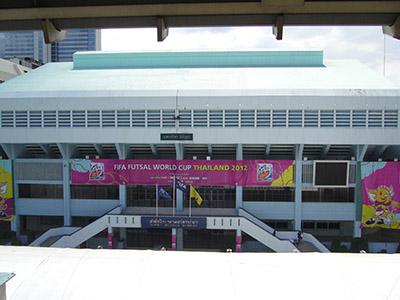

== Draw ==
Group A	Group B
Iran; Japan; Uzbekistan; Kyrgyzstan; Macau	Thailand; South Korea; Kazakhstan; Singapore

== Group stage ==
=== Group A ===
Team	Pld	W	D	L	GF	GA	GD	Pts
Iran	4	4	0	0	44	7	+37	12
Japan	4	3	0	1	24	9	+15	9
Uzbekistan	4	2	0	2	26	17	+9	6
Kyrgyzstan	4	1	0	3	13	34	−21	3
Macau	4	0	0	4	5	45	−40	0

5 May 1999

Japan	4–2	Uzbekistan

Nimibutr Indoor Stadium, Bangkok

5 May 1999

Iran	22–0	Macau

Nimibutr Indoor Stadium, Bangkok

6 May 1999

Iran	6–2	Japan

Nimibutr Indoor Stadium, Bangkok

6 May 1999

Kyrgyzstan	6–3	Macau

Nimibutr Indoor Stadium, Bangkok

7 May 1999

Macau	1–12	Japan

Nimibutr Indoor Stadium, Bangkok

7 May 1999

Uzbekistan	15–6	Kyrgyzstan

Nimibutr Indoor Stadium, Bangkok

8 May 1999

Uzbekistan	4–6	Iran

Nimibutr Indoor Stadium, Bangkok

8 May 1999

Kyrgyzstan	0–6	Japan

Nimibutr Indoor Stadium, Bangkok

9 May 1999

Macau	1–5	Uzbekistan

Nimibutr Indoor Stadium, Bangkok

9 May 1999

Iran	10–1	Kyrgyzstan

Nimibutr Indoor Stadium, Bangkok

=== Group B ===
Team	Pld	W	D	L	GF	GA	GD	Pts
Kazakhstan	3	2	1	0	26	6	+20	7
Thailand	3	2	0	1	19	9	+10	6
South Korea	3	1	1	1	18	14	+4	4
Singapore	3	0	0	3	4	38	−34	0

5 May 1999

South Korea	3–3	Kazakhstan

Nimibutr Indoor Stadium, Bangkok

6 May 1999

Singapore	3–11	South Korea

Nimibutr Indoor Stadium, Bangkok

7 May 1999

Kazakhstan	4–3	Thailand

Nimibutr Indoor Stadium, Bangkok

8 May 1999

Kazakhstan	19–0	Singapore

Nimibutr Indoor Stadium, Bangkok

8 May 1999

Thailand	8–4	South Korea

Nimibutr Indoor Stadium, Bangkok

9 May 1999

Singapore	1–8	Thailand

Nimibutr Indoor Stadium, Bangkok

== Knockout stage ==
Semi-finals
March 11 – Bangkok
Iran	8
Thailand	2
March 11 – Bangkok
Kazakhstan	9
Japan	6

Final
March 12 – Bangkok
Iran	4
Kazakhstan	1
Third place
March 12 – Bangkok
Thailand	8
Japan	6

=== Semi-finals ===
11 May 1999

Iran	8–2	Thailand

Nimibutr Indoor Stadium, Bangkok

11 May 1999

Kazakhstan	9–6	Japan

Nimibutr Indoor Stadium, Bangkok

=== Third place play-off ===
12 May 1999

Thailand	8–6	Japan

Nimibutr Indoor Stadium, Bangkok

=== Final ===
12 May 1999

Iran	4–1	Kazakhstan

Nimibutr Indoor Stadium, Bangkok

== Awards ==
AFC Futsal Championship 2000 winners

Iran
2nd title

Amir Farrashi, Asghar Ghahremani, Safar Ali Kazemi, Mohammad Reza Heidarian, Reza Rezaei Kamal, Reza Behbahani, Ahmad Baghbanbashi, Ahmad Pariazar, Kazem Mohammadi, Ali Saneei, Babak Masoumi, Vahid Shamsaei, Siamak Dadashi,
Coach: (Iran) Hossein Shams

- Top Scorer
  - (Thailand) Therdsak Chaiman (11 goals)
