= Mohammad Hashemzadeh =

Iranian footballer

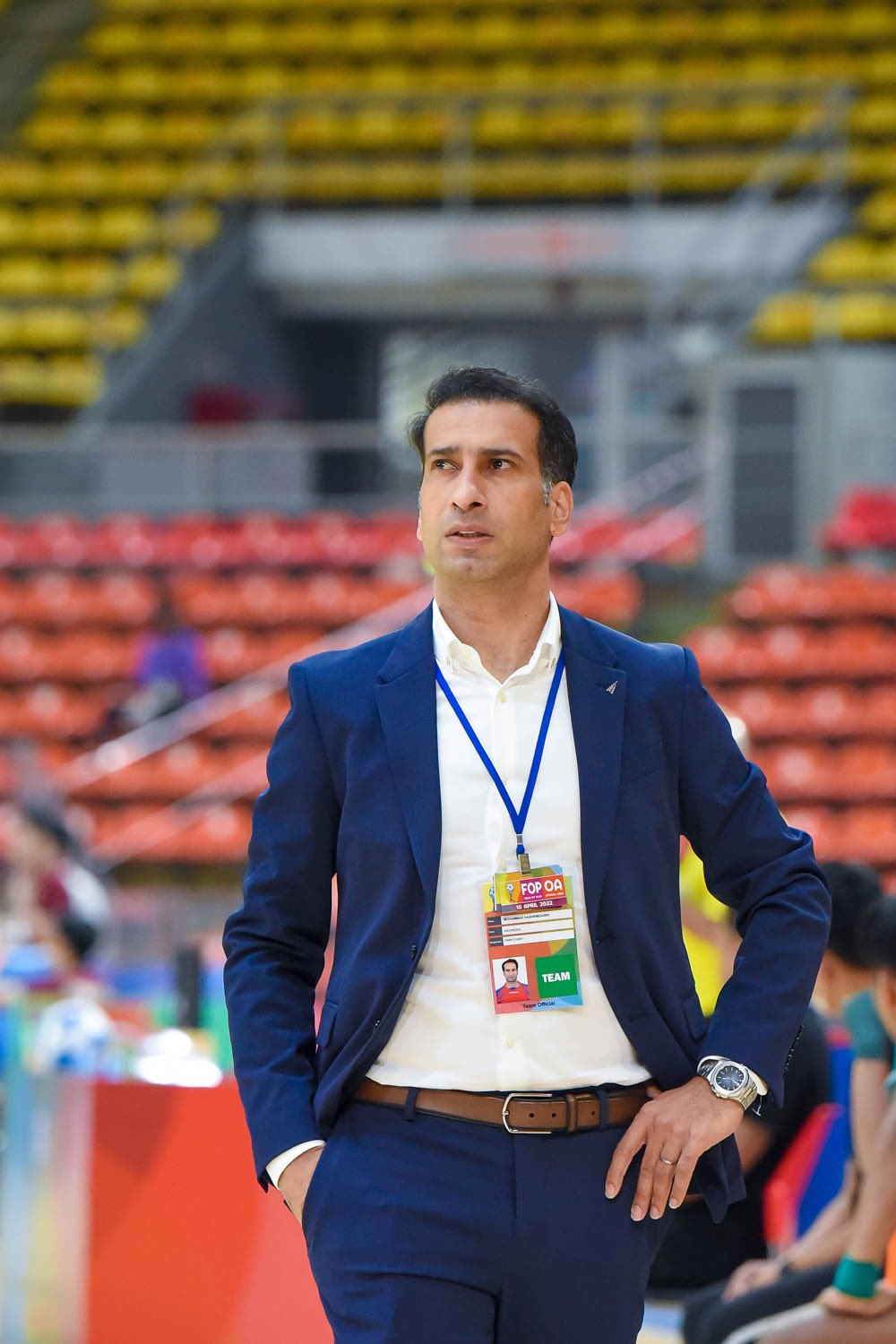

Personal information
- Full name: Mohammad Hashemzadeh
- Date of birth: 20 January 1977 (age 49)
- Place of birth: Abadan, Iran
- Position: Winger

Senior career*
Years	Team	Apps	(Gls)
- Dena Shiraz (football)
- Sanaye Electronic (football)
- Zarrin Dasht Shiraz
- Sadra
- Hesa
- Sadra
- Esteghlal
–2007	Elmo Adab		
2007–2008	Tam Iran Khodro		
2008–2012	Foolad Mahan		
2012–2013	Giti Pasand		(2)

International career
2001–2010	Iran	143	(57)

Managerial career
- 2011–2012: Foolad Mahan (assistant)
- 2012–2013: Giti Pasand (assistant)
- 2013–2020: Iran (assistant)
- 2020–2021: Giti Pasand (assistant)
- 2021: Iran (assistant)
- 2021–2022: Gohar Zamin (technical manager)
- 2022–2023: Indonesia
- * Club domestic league appearances and goals

Mohammad Hashemzadeh (Persian: محمد هاشم‌زاده; born 20 January 1977) is an Iranian professional futsal coach and former player.

== Achievements with Domestic Teams ==
First Runner-up of Iran's National League with Hesa Isfahan Club (1999-2000)

Second Runner-up of Iran's National League with Hesa Isfahan Club (2000-2001)

Championship of Iran's National League with Tam Irankhodro Club (2007-2008)

Championship of Iran's National League with Foolad Mahan Isfahan Club (2008-2009)

Championship of Iran's National League with Foolad Mahan Isfahan Club (2009-2010)

Championship of Iran's National League with Gitipasand Isfahan Club (2010-2011)

Championship of Iran's National League with Gitipasand Isfahan Club (2016-2017) – As Coach

Champion of Asian Futsal Clubs with Foolad Mahan Isfahan Club (2009)

== Achievements with Domestic Teams ==
Champion AFC Futsal Championship in Tehran in 2001

Champion AFC Futsal Championship in Indonesia in 2002

Champion AFC Futsal Championship in Tehran in 2003

Champion AFC Futsal Championship in Macao in 2004

Champion AFC Futsal Championship in Vietnam in 2005

Champion AFC Futsal Championship in Japan in 2007

Champion AFC Futsal Championship in Thailand in 2008

Champion AFC Futsal Championship in Uzbekistan in 2010 – Team Captain

Champion of The 1st Asian Indoor Games in Thailand in 2005

Presence in World Cup 2004 in Taipei

Stood at the 5th place in the Futsal World Cup in Brazil in 2008

First Runner-up of the 2014 AFC Futsal Championship in Vietnam – As Coach

Champion of the 2016 AFC Futsal Championship in Uzbekistan – As Coach

Second Runner-up of the Futsal World Cup in Columbia in 2016

Champion AFC Futsal Championship in Chinese Taipei in 2018

Champion of The 5 th Asian Indoor Games In Turkmenistan 2018
