= Babak Masoumi =

Iranian footballer (1972–2011)

Personal information
- Full name: Babak Masoumi Daraki
- Date of birth: 13 July 1972
- Place of birth: Tehran, Iran
- Date of death: 10 August 2011 (aged 39)
- Place of death: Tehran, Iran
- Position: Forward

Senior career*
Years	Team	Apps	(Gls)
1995–1999	Fath		
- PAS
- Esteghlal
–2006	Shahid Mansouri		
2006–2007	Tam Iran Khodro		

International career
1999–2007	Iran		

Managerial career
- 2009–2010: Persepolis
- 2010–2011: Dabiri
- 2011: Steel Azin
- * Club domestic league appearances and goals

Babak Masoumi (Persian: بابک معصومی; 13 July 1972 – 10 August 2011) was an Iranian professional futsal player and coach who captained the Iran national team.

== Career ==
Masoumi began his career playing football for Fath. He then changed codes and began to play futsal, where he played for Fath Tehran, PAS Tehran and Tam Iran Khodro.

Despite suffering from cancer, Masoumi was head coach of Persepolis futsal team in the 2008–09 season and a few weeks afterwards was appointed as technical manager of Steel Azin futsal team. He was head coach of Dabiri at the time of his death.

== Death ==
On 10 August 2011, Masoumi died from blood cancer from which he had been suffering since 2008. Despite this, Masoumi believed beforehand that he was cured of the disease.

Masoumi had struggled to pay for his medical care and in November 2008, an exhibition game was played between Esteghlal and a Selection of Karaj team in order to raise money for the medical treatment of Masoumi and Mohammad Parsa. In addition to this Iranian football star Ali Karimi paid for Masoumi's medical bills. His body was buried on 12 August 2011, in Karaj.

== Honours ==
Iran futsal

- AFC Futsal Championship: 1999, 2000, 2004, 2005, 2007

Individual

- Best Asian Futsal Player of the Year: 2003
