= Ghadir Arena of Urmia =

Sporting venue in Iran

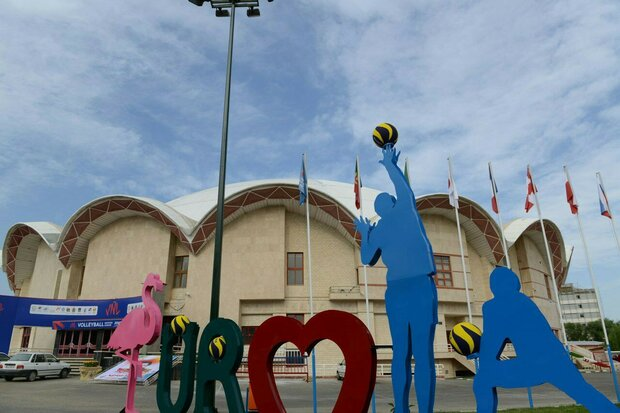
- Full name: Ghadir Arena of Urmia
- Location: Urmia, West Azerbaijan, Iran
- Owner: Physical Education Organization
- Capacity: 6,000

Construction
- Opened: 2007

Tenants
- 2010 Asian Men's Volleyball Cup; 2012 WAFF Futsal Championship; 2012 Asian Junior Men's Volleyball Championship; 2019 FIVB Volleyball Men's Nations League – Preliminary Round; 2020 AFC Futsal Championship qualification – Central & South Zone; 2023 Asian Men's Volleyball Championship; Shahrdari Urmia Volleyball Club Home Matches

The Ghadir Arena of Urmia is an indoor sports arena in Urmia, Iran. It is the home stadium of Volleyball Super League team Shahrdari Urmia. The stadium can hold up to 6,000 people. The Ghadir Arena in terms of ceiling height, distance to the spectators, type of flooring and equipment is the best volleyball hall in Iran.
