= Mohammad Reza Heidarian =

Iranian futsal manager (born 1974)

Personal information
- Full name: Mohammad Reza Heidarian
- Date of birth: 17 February 1974 (age 52)
- Place of birth: Tehran, Iran
- Height: 5 ft 11 1/2 in (1.82 m)
- Position: Winger

Senior career*
Years	Team	Apps	(Gls)
1994–2003	Esteghlal		
2003–2005	Ceccano		
2005–2007	Esteghlal		
2007–2008	Qatar SC		
2008–2009	Elmo Adab		
2009–2012	Persepolis		
2012	Shahrvand		
2013	Borna Khuzestan		

International career^{‡}
1999–2008	Iran		

Managerial career
- 2007: Esteghlal
- 2010–2011: Persepolis
- 2011: Iran
- 2011–2012: Persepolis
- 2012: Rah Sari
- 2013: Iran U23
- 2013: Borna Khuzestan
- 2016–2017: Yasin Pishro
- 2020–2022: Iran (assistant)
Medal record
Representing Iran
Men's Futsal
AFC Futsal Championship
Gold medal – first place	1999 Kuala Lumpur
Gold medal – first place	2000 Bangkok
Gold medal – first place	2001 Tehran
Gold medal – first place	2002 Jakarta
Gold medal – first place	2003 Tehran
Gold medal – first place	2004 Macau
Gold medal – first place	2005 Ho Chi Minh City
Gold medal – first place	2007 Osaka & Amagasaki
Gold medal – first place	2008 Bangkok
- * Club domestic league appearances and goals as of 17 January 2022 ‡ National team caps and goals as of 10 August 2016

Mohammad Reza Heidarian (Persian: محمدرضا حیدریان; born 17 February 1974) is an Iranian professional futsal coach and former player.

He was a Winger for Esteghlal, Ceccano, Qatar SC, Elmo Adab, Persepolis and was the captain of Iran national futsal team.

He has been awarded the most valuable player of the Asian Futsal Championship.

Heidarian played for Ceccano Calcio a 5, a Serie A2 futsal side based in the small town of Ceccano. He was highly successful at the club and was selected as captain of the club in the 2004–05 season.

Following Iran's success in the 2008 AFC Futsal Championship, Heidarian decided to bid farewell from international futsal and retired from the national side.

== Iran National Futsal Team ==
Heydarian was suggested to Iran football federation by Mohammad Nazemasharieh, current head coach of Iran national futsal team to join his team, and became coach of National team on 30 of June 2020 by decision of futsal and beach football technical committee of Iran Football Federation.

== Honours ==
=== Team ===
- AFC Futsal Championship
  - Champions (9): 1999, 2000, 2001, 2002, 2003, 2004, 2005, 2007, 2008

=== Individual ===
- Most Valuable Player, AFC Futsal Championship, 2004

== Notes and references ==
Sporting positions
Preceded by (Iran) Vahid Shamsaei	AFC Futsal Championship MVP; 2004	Succeeded by (Japan) Kenichiro Kogure
