= Javad Maheri =

Iranian footballer

Ali
Personal information
- Full name: .
- Date of birth: 10 December 1983 (age 42)
- Place of birth: Esfahan, Iran
- Position: Midfielder

Team information
- Current team: Mes Rafsanjan

Youth career
- –2006: Sepahan

Senior career*
Years	Team	Apps	(Gls)
2006–2007	Sepahan	16	(1)
2007–2009	Sepahan Novin	?	(8)
2009–2010	Sepahan	14	(1)
2010–2011	→ Foolad Natanz (loan)		
2011–2012	→ Mes Rafsanjan (loan)		
2012–2013	Shahrdari Arak	23	(0)
2013–	Giti Pasand	2	(1)

International career^{‡}
- Iran national futsal team
- * Club domestic league appearances and goals as of 2 June 2010 (UTC) ‡ National team caps and goals as of 2 June 2010

Javad Maheri (born December 10, 1983) is an Iranian footballer who plays for Sepahan in the Iran Pro League.

He currently plays as the loan for Mes Rafsanjan football club.

== Club career ==
Maheri joined Sepahan in 2009.

=== Club career statistics ===
As of 25 August 2010

Club performance			League		Cup		Continental		Total	
Season	Club	League	Apps	Goals	Apps	Goals	Apps	Goals	Apps	Goals
Iran			League		Hazfi Cup		Asia		Total	
2006–07	Sepahan	Persian Gulf Cup	16	1						
2007–08	Sepahan Novin	Azadegan League	?	2						
2008–09	Sepahan Novin	Azadegan League	?	6						
2009–10	Sepahan	Persian Gulf Cup	14	1						
2010–11	Foolad Natanz	Azadegan League	0	0	0	0	0	0	0	0
2011–12	Mes Rafsanjan	Azadegan League	0	0	0	0	0	0	0	0
Total	Iran		?	10						
Career total			?	10			0	0		

- Assist Goals

Season	Team	Assists
10–11	Sepahan	0

== Honours ==
=== Club ===
- Iran's Premier Football League
  - Winner: 2
    - 2009/10 with Sepahan
    - 2010/11 with Sepahan
