= Siamak Dadashi =

Iranian futsal

Personal information
- Full name: Siamak Dadashi
- Date of birth: 13 July 1974 (age 52)
- Place of birth: Tehran, Iran
- Position: Winger

Team information
- Current team: Iran (assistant)

Senior career*
Years	Team	Apps	(Gls)
- Peyman
- Esteghlal
- Shahid Mansouri
- Shensa

International career^{‡}
- Iran

Managerial career
- Iran U19
- 2022–2025: Iran (assistant)
- * Club domestic league appearances and goals as of 5 August 2022 ‡ National team caps and goals as of 14 April 2013

Siamak Dadashi (Persian: سیامک داداشی; born 13 July 1974) is an Iranian professional futsal coach and former player. He is currently assistant coach of Iran.

== Honours ==
=== Country ===
- AFC Futsal Championship
  - Champion (5): 2000 - 2001 - 2002 - 2003 - 2004
