= Kazem Mohammadi =

Iranian futsal player (1973–2021)

Personal information
- Full name: Kazem Mohammadi Tirabadi
- Date of birth: 23 August 1973
- Place of birth: Rey, Iran
- Date of death: 3 August 2021 (aged 47)
- Place of death: Karaj, Iran
- Position: Winger

Senior career*
Years	Team	Apps	(Gls)
- Peyman
- Pas
- Azad University
–2009	Tam Iran Khodro		
2009–2010	Persepolis		
2010–2011	Dabiri		

International career^{‡}
1998–2008	Iran		
Medal record
Representing Iran
Men's Futsal
AFC Futsal Championship
Gold medal – first place	1999 Kuala Lumpur
Gold medal – first place	2000 Bangkok
Gold medal – first place	2001 Tehran
Gold medal – first place	2003 Tehran
Gold medal – first place	2004 Macau
Gold medal – first place	2007 Osaka & Amagasaki
Gold medal – first place	2008 Bangkok
Asian Indoor Games
Gold medal – first place	2005 Bangkok
- * Club domestic league appearances and goals as of 10 January 2022 ‡ National team caps and goals as of 10 January 2022

Kazem Mohammadi (Persian: کاظم محمدی; 23 August 1973 – 3 August 2021) was an Iranian professional futsal player.

== Biography ==
Mohammadi was a winger, and a former member of the Iran national futsal team.

He played in 2004 FIFA Futsal World Championship in Chinese Taipei.

=== Death ===
After struggling over a week with COVID-19, Mohammadi died at Ghaem Hospital in Karaj on 3 August 2021, aged 47.

== Honours ==
Iran

- AFC Futsal Championship (7): 1999, 2000, 2001, 2003, 2004, 2007, 2008

Individual

- AFC Futsal Championship top scorer: 1999 (18 goals)
