= 1996 FIFA Futsal World Championship qualification (AFC) =

Tournament details
- Host countries: Shanghai, China (East); Tehran, Iran (West); Kuala Lumpur, Malaysia (ASEAN)
- Dates: March 27 – August 17
- Teams: 10 (from 1 confederation)

Tournament statistics
- Matches played: 15
- Goals scored: 181 (12.07 per match)

The 1996 FIFA Futsal World Championship qualification is the qualification process organized by the Asian Football Confederation (AFC) to determine the participating teams for the 1996 FIFA Futsal World Championship, the 3rd edition of the international men's futsal championship of FIFA. A total of 3 teams qualify to play in the World Championship. The qualification process will be divided to three zones.

== Draw ==
	Teams
East Zone Host: China	1. South Korea; 2. Hong Kong; 3. Japan; 4. **China**
West Zone Host: Iran	1. **Iran**; 2. Tajikistan; 3. Kazakhstan
ASEAN Zone Host: Malaysia	1. **Malaysia**; 2. Philippines; 3. Brunei

Notes

- Teams in **bold** qualified for the FIFA World Championship.

== East Zone ==
Pos	Team	Pld	W	D	L	GF	GA	GD	Pts	Qualification
1	China	3	3	0	0	29	14	+15	**9**	1996 FIFA Futsal World Championship
2	South Korea	3	2	0	1	14	11	+3	**6**	
3	Japan	3	0	1	2	8	12	−4	**1**	
4	Hong Kong	3	0	1	2	9	23	−14	**1**	

Source: RSSSF
Rules for classification: Qualification tiebreakers
27 March 1996

China	13 – 5	Hong Kong

27 March 1996

Japan	1 – 2	South Korea

28 March 1996

China	9 – 5	South Korea

28 March 1996

Japan	3 – 3	Hong Kong

29 March 1996

China	7 – 4	Japan

29 March 1996

Hong Kong	1 – 7	South Korea

== West Zone ==
Pos	Team	Pld	W	D	L	GF	GA	GD	Pts	Qualification
1	Iran	4	4	0	0	47	8	+39	**12**	1996 FIFA Futsal World Championship
2	Kazakhstan	4	2	0	2	20	27	−7	**6**	
3	Tajikistan	4	0	0	4	8	40	−32	**0**	

Source: RSSSF
Rules for classification: Qualification tiebreakers
1 May 1996

Iran	14 – 2	Kazakhstan

Azadi Indoor Stadium, Tehran
1 May 1996

Tajikistan	3 – 10	Kazakhstan

Azadi Indoor Stadium, Tehran

2 May 1996

Iran	15 – 1	Tajikistan

Azadi Indoor Stadium, Tehran
2 May 1996

Tajikistan	3 – 4	Kazakhstan

Azadi Indoor Stadium, Tehran

3 May 1996

Iran	7 – 4	Kazakhstan

Azadi Indoor Stadium, Tehran
3 May 1996

Iran	11 – 1	Tajikistan

Azadi Indoor Stadium, Tehran

== ASEAN Zone ==
Pos	Team	Pld	W	D	L	GF	GA	GD	Pts	Qualification
1	Malaysia	2	1	1	0	20	10	+10	**4**	1996 FIFA Futsal World Championship
2	Brunei	2	0	2	0	15	15	0	**2**	
3	Philippines	2	0	1	1	11	21	−10	**1**	

Source: RSSSF
Rules for classification: Qualification tiebreakers
15 August 1996

Brunei	8 – 8	Philippines

16 August 1996

Malaysia	13 – 3	Philippines

17 August 1996

Malaysia	7 – 7	Brunei

== Qualified teams ==
The following 3 teams qualified for the 1996 FIFA Futsal World Championship

Team	Qualified as	Previous appearances in FIFA Futsal World Championship^{1}
China	East Zone	1 (1992)
Iran	West Zone	1 (1992)
Malaysia	ASEAN Zone	0 (debut)

^{1} Bold indicates champions for that year. Italic indicates hosts for that year.

== See also ==
- 1996 FIFA Futsal World Championship
