= 1999 AFC Futsal Championship =

Kejohanan Futsal AFC 1999

Tournament details
- Host country: Malaysia
- Dates: 5–10 March
- Teams: 9 (from 1 confederation)
- Venue: 1 (in 1 host city)

Final positions
- Champions: Iran (1st title)
- Runners-up: South Korea
- Third place: Kazakhstan
- Fourth place: Japan

Tournament statistics
- Matches played: 20
- Goals scored: 253 (12.65 per match)
- Top scorer(s): (Iran) Kazem Mohammadi (Iran) Reza Rezaei Kamal (18 goals)

The 1999 AFC Futsal Championship was held in Kuala Lumpur, Malaysia from 5 to 10 March 1999.

== Venue ==
Kuala Lumpur
Stadium Negara
Capacity: 10,000
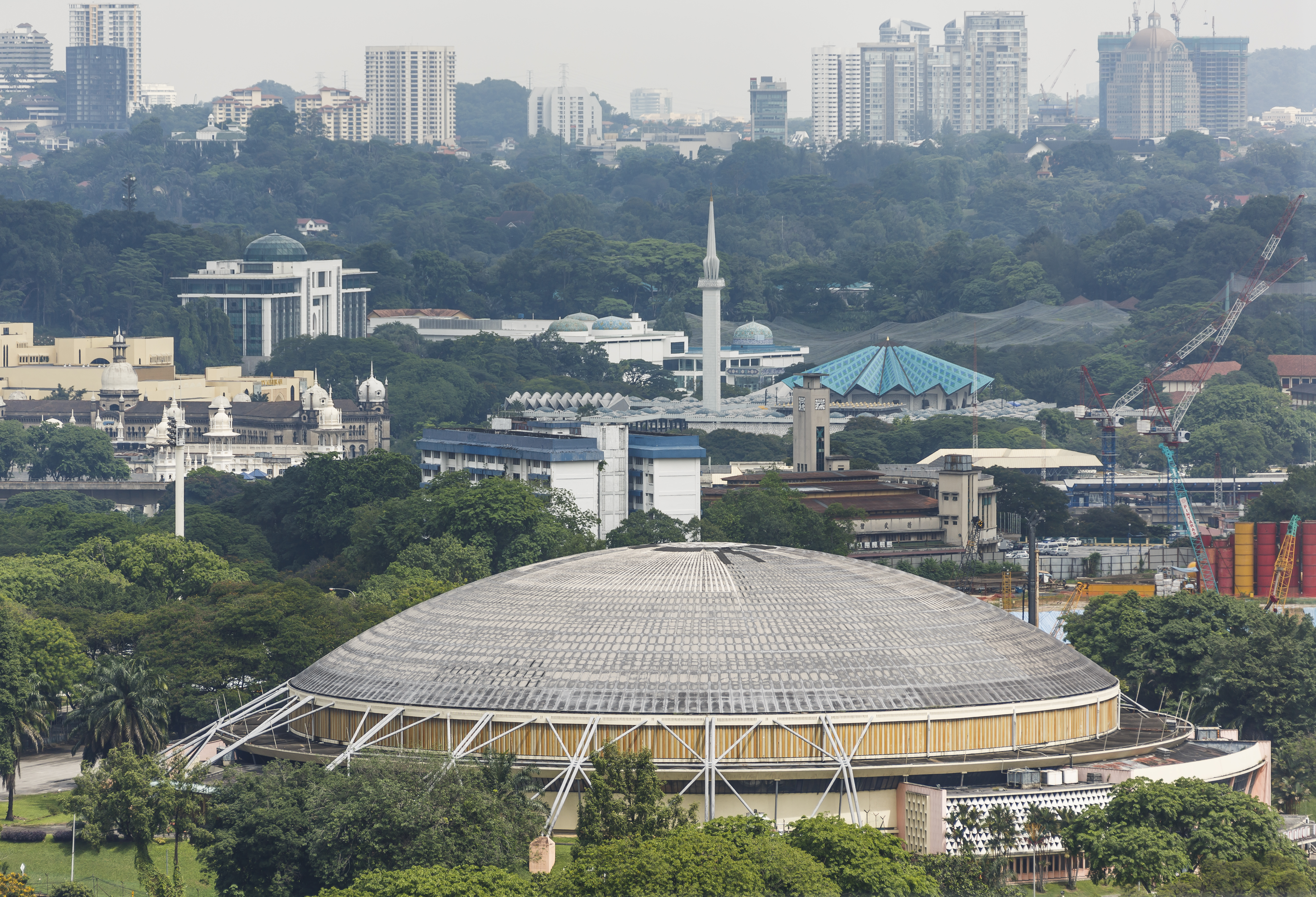

== Draw ==
Group A	Group B
Iran; Thailand; South Korea; Kyrgyzstan; Singapore	Malaysia; Japan; Uzbekistan; Kazakhstan

== Group stage ==
=== Group A ===
Team	Pld	W	D	L	GF	GA	GD	Pts
Iran	4	4	0	0	76	4	+72	12
South Korea	4	2	1	1	24	15	+9	7
Thailand	4	2	0	2	43	22	+21	6
Kyrgyzstan	4	1	1	2	18	45	−27	4
Singapore	4	0	0	4	5	80	−75	0

5 March 1999
10:00

Kyrgyzstan	2–2	South Korea

Stadium Negara, Kuala Lumpur

5 March 1999
13:00

Singapore	0–21	Thailand

Stadium Negara, Kuala Lumpur

5 March 1999
18:30

Singapore	5–9	Kyrgyzstan

Stadium Negara, Kuala Lumpur

5 March 1999
21:30

South Korea	5–4	Thailand

Stadium Negara, Kuala Lumpur

7 March 1999
10:00

Kyrgyzstan	0–21	Iran

Stadium Negara, Kuala Lumpur

7 March 1999
11:30

South Korea	14–0	Singapore

Stadium Negara, Kuala Lumpur

7 March 1999
21:30

Iran	36–0	Singapore

Stadium Negara, Kuala Lumpur

8 March 1999
10:00

Thailand	17–7	Kyrgyzstan

Stadium Negara, Kuala Lumpur

8 March 1999
11:30

Iran	9–3	South Korea

Stadium Negara, Kuala Lumpur

8 March 1999
21:30

Thailand	1–10	Iran

Stadium Negara, Kuala Lumpur

=== Group B ===
Team	Pld	W	D	L	GF	GA	GD	Pts
Kazakhstan	3	2	0	1	12	8	+4	6
Japan	3	1	2	0	14	11	+3	5
Uzbekistan	3	1	1	1	18	12	+6	4
Malaysia	3	0	1	2	11	24	−13	1

5 March 1999
08:30

Uzbekistan	2–3	Kazakhstan

Stadium Negara, Kuala Lumpur

5 March 1999
11:30

Malaysia	5–5	Japan

Stadium Negara, Kuala Lumpur

5 March 1999
17:00

Malaysia	4–11	Uzbekistan

Stadium Negara, Kuala Lumpur

5 March 1999
20:00

Kazakhstan	1–4	Japan

Stadium Negara, Kuala Lumpur

7 March 1999
20:00

Kazakhstan	8–2	Malaysia

Stadium Negara, Kuala Lumpur

8 March 1999
20:00

Japan	5–5	Uzbekistan

Stadium Negara, Kuala Lumpur

== Knockout stage ==
Semi-finals
March 9 – Kuala Lumpur
Iran	5
Japan	2
March 9 – Kuala Lumpur
Kazakhstan	3
South Korea	8

Final
March 10 – Kuala Lumpur
Iran	9
South Korea	1
Third place
March 10 – Kuala Lumpur
Japan	2 (3)
Kazakhstan (p)	2 (4)

=== Semi-finals ===
9 March 1999
20:00

Iran	5–2	Japan

Stadium Negara, Kuala Lumpur

9 March 1999
21:30

Kazakhstan	3–8	South Korea

Stadium Negara, Kuala Lumpur

=== Third place play-off ===
10 March 1999
20:00

Japan	2–2 (a.e.t.)	Kazakhstan
Penalties
	3–4

Stadium Negara, Kuala Lumpur

=== Final ===
10 March 1999
21:30

Iran	9–1	South Korea

Stadium Negara, Kuala Lumpur

== Awards ==
AFC Futsal Championship 1999 winners

Iran
1st title

Asghar Ghahremani, Masoud Seifi, Amir Farrashi, Mohammad Reza Heidarian, Abdollah Rezaeinejad, Babak Masoumi, Safar Ali Kazemi, Reza Rezaei Kamal, Ahmad Baghbanbashi, Alireza Afzal, Kazem Mohammadi, Ali Saneei
Coach: (Iran) Hossein Shams

Top Scorers

- (Iran) Kazem Mohammadi (18 goals)
- (Iran) Reza Rezaei Kamal (18 goals)
