= Persepolis FSC =

Iranian futsal club

- Full name: Persepolis Tehran Futsal Club
- Founded: 1975
- Dissolved: 2014
- Ground: Khorshid Arena, Tehran
- Website: http://fc-perspolis.com
Home colours	Away colours	Third colours

Persepolis Futsal Club (Persian: باشگاه فوتسال پرسپولیس) was an Iranian professional futsal club based in Tehran.

== Season-by-season ==
=== Men ===
The table below chronicles the achievements of the Club in various competitions.

Season	League	Position	Hazfi	Notes
2002-03	Premier League	4th
2003-04	Super League	9th
2004-05	Super League	14th		Relegation
2005~09	Dissolved
2009-10	1st Division	2nd/Group B		Promoted
2010-11	Super League	12th
2011-12	Super League	11th
2012–13	Super League	Dissolved
2013-14	1st Division	2nd/Group A	Round of 32

=== Women ===
Season	League	Position	Notes
2008-09	Premier League	3rd
2009~11	Dissolved
2011–12	Premier League	Champions
2012–13	Premier League	Runners-up
2013–14	Premier League	3rd

Champions	Runners-up	Third Place	Fourth Place	Relegation	Promoted	Did not qualify	not held

== Players ==
=== Former players ===
For details on former players, see Category:Persepolis FSC players.

=== World Cup players ===
(Chinese Taipei) World Cup 2004

- (Iran) Reza Nasseri
- (Iran) Amir Hanifi
- (Iran) Majid Raeisi

== Managers ==
(Iran) Mahmoud Khorakchi 2002–2003
(Iran) Saeid Abdollahnejad 2003–2004
(Iran) Mohammad Hassan Ansarifard 2004–2005
(Iran) Alireza Raadi 2009
(Iran) Babak Masoumi 2009–2010
(Iran) Mohammad Reza Heidarian 2010–2011
(Iran) Reza Kordi 2011
(Iran) Mohammad Reza Heidarian 2011–2012
(Iran) Vahid Nematollahi 2013–2014

== Honours ==
National:

- Iran Futsal's 1st Division
  - Champions (1): 2009–10
- Ramezan Cup
  - Champions (1): 2003

== Affiliated clubs ==
- (England) Birmingham Tigers Futsal Club
