= Saeid Rajabi (futsal) =

Iranian futsal player

Personal information
- Full name: Saeid Rajabi Shirazi
- Date of birth: 10 March 1965 (age 61)
- Place of birth: Karaj, Iran

Senior career*
Years	Team	Apps	(Gls)
1985–1990	Gostaresh (football)		
1990–2001	Saipa (football)		

International career^{‡}
1992–1995	Iran (futsal)		

Managerial career
- 2009–2012: Saipa U21
- 2013–2014: Iran U17
- 2013–2017: Saipa (assistant)
- 2016: Saipa (caretaker)
- * Club domestic league appearances and goals as of 7 September 2021 ‡ National team caps and goals as of 7 September 2021

Saeid Rajabi Shirazi (Persian: سعید رجبی شیرازی; born 10 March 1965) is an Iranian professional football coach and former football and futsal player.

== Honours ==
=== Individual ===
- Top Goalscorer:
  - FIFA Futsal World Cup: 1992 (17 goals)
