= Ali Akbar Yousefi (footballer) =

Iranian footballer

Personal information
- Full name: Ali Akbar Yousefi
- Date of birth: 12 September 1969 (age 57)
- Position: Midfielder

Senior career*
Years	Team	Apps	(Gls)
1990–1997	PAS Tehran		
1997–2001	Bahman		
2001–2002	PAS Tehran		
2003–2004	Saipa		

International career
1992–1996	Iran	8	(1)
1992	Iran (futsal)		
- * Club domestic league appearances and goals

Ali Akbar Yousefi is an Iranian football midfielder who played for Iran in the 1992 Asian Cup. He also played for PAS Tehran F.C. and Saipa F.C.
