= 2012 WAFF Futsal Championship =

Tournament details
- Host country: Iran
- Dates: 27 April – 2 May
- Teams: 5
- Venue: 1 (in 1 host city)

Final positions
- Champions: Iran (2nd title)
- Runners-up: Jordan
- Third place: Iraq
- Fourth place: Kuwait

Tournament statistics
- Matches played: 10
- Goals scored: 100 (10 per match)
- Top scorer(s): (Iran) Javad Asghari Moghaddam (Iran) Vahid Shamsaee (6 goals each)
- Best player: (Jordan) Samer Naser Aldeen

The 2012 WAFF Futsal Championship was the 3rd WAFF Futsal Championship. It was held in Ghadir Arena, Urmia, Iran between 27 April and 2 May 2012.

== Teams ==
- Iran (6)
- Iraq (55)
- Jordan (Inactive for more than 24 months)
- Kuwait (70)
- Palestine (90)

== Group stage ==
The draw was held on 26 April 2012.

Team	Pld	W	D	L	GF	GA	GD	Pts
Iran	4	4	0	0	40	6	+34	12
Jordan	4	2	1	1	18	14	+4	7
Iraq	4	2	0	2	19	23	–4	6
Kuwait	4	1	1	2	14	21	–7	4
Palestine	4	0	0	4	9	36	–27	0

27 April 2012
16:00

Iran	9 – 2	Kuwait
Vahid Shamsaei 21', 40'; Mohammad Keshavarz 23'; Hossein Tayyebi 25'; Majid Latifi 27'; Mahdi Javid 29'; Ahmad Esmaeilpour 34'; Javad Asghari Moghaddam 34', 37'	Report	Shaker Al Mutairi 22', 29'

Ghadir Hall, Urmia

27 April 2012
18:00

Jordan	8 – 4	Iraq
Samer Naser Aldeen 7', 18', 30'; Nooreddin Alkhaza'leh 13', 21', 39'; Amjed Alqorom 17'; Shady Jubran 28'	Report	Karrar Mohsin Mohammed 2', 32'; Hussein Abd ali Mohammed 3', 36'

Ghadir Hall, Urmia

28 April 2012
16:00

Iraq	5 – 4	Kuwait
Hashim Khalid Kadhim 12', 33'; Mustafa Bachay Hamzah 20'; Mohammed Ibrahim Ahmed 23'; Karrar Mohsin Mohammed 23'	Report	Ali Al Butai 13'; Abdulrahman Al Tawail 14', 15'; Abdulrahman Al Mosabehi 23'

Ghadir Hall, Urmia

28 April 2012
18:00

Jordan	6 – 1	Palestine
Shady Jubran 5'; Fahed Alqawasmi 11'; Ibrahim Qandeel 16'; Samer Naser Aldeen 30', 31'; Mahmoud Al Khatib 40'	Report	Mahmoud Bassam Alneirab 18'

Ghadir Hall, Urmia

29 April 2012
16:00

Palestine	1 – 19	Iran
Tareq Abugheneima 34'	Report	Mohammad Keshavarz 1', 24'; Ali Asghar Hassanzadeh 3', 5', 18', 23'; Vahid Shamsaei 4', 22', 32', 33', 38'; Javad Asghari Moghaddam 7', 16', 30', 40'; Hossein Tayyebi 17', 28', 34'; Ahmad Esmaeilpour 18'

Ghadir Hall, Urmia

29 April 2012
18:00

Kuwait	4 – 4	Jordan
Abdulrahman Al Tawail 6'; Abdulrahman Al Wadi 21', 22', 36'	Report	Majdi Qandeel 10'; Khaled Awad 17'; Samer Naser Aldeen 25', 30'

Ghadir Hall, Urmia

1 May 2012
15:00

Iraq	3 – 7	Iran
Karrar Mohsin Mohammed 8'; Idrees Ghadban Ahmed 18'; Mustafa Bachay Hamzah 33'	Report	Vahid Shamsaei 2'; Mohammad Keshavarz 12'; Ahmad Esmaeilpour 14', 15'; Ali Asghar Hassanzadeh 21'; Javad Asghari Moghaddam 29', 40'

Ghadir Hall, Urmia

1 May 2012
17:00

Kuwait	4 – 3	Palestine
Abdulrahman Al Tawail 32'; Salem Al Mukaimi 34'; Abdulrahman Al Mosabehi 36', 37'	Report	Mohammed Rebhi Ishtaiwi 27', 30'; Mahmoud Haidar Fahajan 35'

Ghadir Hall, Urmia

2 May 2012
15:00

Palestine	4 – 7	Iraq
Eid Adnan Alikkawi 2'; Mohammed Rebhi Ishtaiwi 8'; Mahmoud Haidar Fahajan 12'; Mahmoud Bassam Alneirab 33'	Report	Idrees Ghadban Ahmed 14', 30', 37'; Hashim Khalid Kadhim 14'; Mohammed Ibrahim Ahmed 15'; Karrar Mohsin Mohammed 19'; Kamil Shakir Wadi 25'

Ghadir Hall, Urmia

2 May 2012
17:00

Iran	5 – 0	Jordan
Ahmad Esmaeilpour 9', 11'; Hossein Tayyebi 23', 33'; Mohammad Keshavarz 40'	Report

Ghadir Hall, Urmia

== Awards ==
2012 WAFF Futsal Championship winners

Iran
Second title

- Most Valuable Player
  - (Jordan) Samer Naser Aldeen
- Top Scorer
  - (Iran) Javad Asghari Moghaddam
    (Iran) Vahid Shamsaei (8 goals each)
- Best Goalkeeper
  - (Iran) Mostafa Nazari
- Fair-Play Award
  - Kuwait

== See also ==
- West Asian Futsal Championship
