= India national futsal team results =

India national futsal team

This article summarizes the outcomes of all FIFA recognized matches played by the India national futsal team during the 2020s.Updated as of 26 January 2026 (vs Pakistan).

Summary Matches 1–16
Games	Won	Draw	Lost	GF	GA	Win %
16	4	2	10	47	69	25%
Biggest win
Bhutan 3–11 India 22 January 2026
Biggest defeat
India 1–10 Australia 22 September 2025
Honours
(silver) 2026 SAFF Championship, Thailand

Key
Indicates India national football team won the match
Indicates the match ended in draw
Indicates India national football team lost the match

== 2020s ==
=== 2023 ===
12 August 2023 Friendly	Bahrain	3–0	India	Isa Town, Bahrain
20:30 UTC+5:30	Jassam Saleh 19'; Ali Saleh; Mohamed Al-Sandi	AIFF		Stadium: Khalifa Sports City Stadium

14 August 2023 Friendly	Bahrain	4–0	India	Isa Town, Bahrain
20:30 UTC+5:30	Saleh Ahmed Mukhallaf 4'; Salman Maula 15'; Ammar Hasan Ali Myhad 38'; Nikhil Mali 38' (o.g.)	AIFF		Stadium: Khalifa Sports City Stadium

7 October 2023 2024 AFC Futsal Qual	Tajikistan	6–3	India	Dushanbe, Tajikistan
19:30 UTC+5:30	Kuziev Umed 2'; Sardorov Favazai 14', 35'; Sharipov Muhamadjon 31'	AFC; AIFF	David Laltlansanga 6', 14', 17'	Stadium: Dushanbe Indoor Hall

9 October 2023 2024 AFC Futsal Qual	India	2–5	Myanmar	Dushanbe, Tajikistan
16:30 UTC+5:30	K. Roluahpuia 11'; David Laltlansanga 39'	AFC; AIFF	T.P. Aung 3'; M.T. Aung 13', 40'; David Laltlansanga 19' (o.g.); H.M. Tun 40'	Stadium: Dushanbe Indoor Hall

11 October 2023 2024 AFC Futsal Qual	Palestine	6–5	India	Dushanbe, Tajikistan
16:30 UTC+5:30	Mousa Harara 3'; Zaher Alsamahi 6'; Ahmed Mohammed 20', 34'; Ahmad Massriea 23'	AFC; AIFF	David Laltlansanga 6', 16'; Mali 14', 16'; K. Roluahpuia 28'	Stadium: Dushanbe Indoor Hall

=== 2025 ===
13 September 2025 Friendly	Lebanon	7–2	India	Beirut, Lebanon
21:30 IST	Mario Abou Jaoude 5'; Hassan Maatouk 11', 29'; Steve Koukezian 14', 27'; Majd Hamouch 17'; Mohamad Osman 36'	AIFF	Seaon D'Souza 31'; Mahip Adhikari 38'	Stadium: Al Sadaka Sporting Complex

15 September 2025 Friendly	Lebanon	7–4	India	Beirut, Lebanon
21:30 IST	Mustafa Rhayem 1', 23'; Majd Hamouch 3'; Steve Koukezian 13'; Ali Hamam 28'; Mario Abou Jaoude 29'; Mohamad Kobeissi 38'	AIFF	David Laltlansanga 8'; Marshall 19'; Mali 20'; Aman Shah 30'	Stadium: Al Sadaka Sporting Complex

20 September 2025 2026 AFC Futsal Qual	Kuwait	4–1	India	Ardiya, Kuwait
22:30 IST	Saleh Al Fadhel 10'; Abdulaziz AlSarraj 18'; Mohammed Al Ajmi 27'; Abduellteif Al Basi 37'	AIFF; AFC	David Laltlansanga 9'	Stadium: Qushaian Al-Mutairi Hall

22 September 2025 2026 AFC Futsal Qual	India	1–10	Australia	Ardiya, Kuwait
18:30 IST	Seaon D'Souza 15'	AIFF; AFC	Scott Rogan 5', 32'; Michael Kouta 5'; Corey Sewell 11', 32'; Tyler Garner 17'; Jordan Guerreiro 18', 35'; Wayde Giovenali 20'; Ethan De Melo 21'	Stadium: Qushaian Al-Mutairi Hall

24 September 2025 2026 AFC Futsal Qual	Mongolia	0–3	India	Ardiya, Kuwait
18:30 IST		AIFF	Seaon D'Souza 17', 33'; Anmol Adhikari 35'	Stadium: Qushaian Al-Mutairi Hall

=== 2026 ===
14 January 2026 2026 SAFF Championship	India	4–4	Bangladesh	Bangkok, Thailand
15:00 IST	Anmol Adhikari 12'; Lalsawmpuia 20'; K Roluahpuia 27', 36'	SAFF; AIFF	Md Moin Ahmed 9', 31'; Md Rahbar Wahed Khan 12'16"	Stadium: Nonthaburi Stadium, Bangkok; Attendance: 70; Referee: Chris Sinclair (New Zealand)

18 January 2026 2026 SAFF Championship	India	3–3	Nepal	Bangkok, Thailand
12:30 IST	Laltluangzela 6'; Anmol Adhikari 39'; Nikhil Rajendra Mali 40'	SAFF; AIFF	Bikrant Narsing Rana 5'; Amit Lama 25'; Bijay Shrestha 40'	Stadium: Nonthaburi Stadium; Attendance: 56; Referee: Ali Ahmadi (Iran)

20 January 2026 2026 SAFF Championship	Maldives	5–0	India	Bangkok, Thailand
15:00 IST	Mohamed Imran 12', 30'; Abdulla Shafiu 22'; Ali Shamal Abdulla 24'; Ahmed Hameed 40'	SAFF; AIFF		Stadium: Nonthaburi Stadium; Attendance: 50; Referee: Ali Hafizi (Iran)

22 January 2026 2026 SAFF Championship	Bhutan	3–11	India	Bangkok, Thailand
17:30 IST	Jigme Tshultrim 11'; Jetsuen Dorji 15'; Nima Wangdi 35'	SAFF; AIFF	Jonathan Lalrawngbawla 4'; Jignam Seltob Dorji 6' (o.g.); Laltluangzela 9', 39'; Lalsawmpuia 15'; Anmol Adhikari 17', 32'; Seon D'Souza 34'; Nikhil Mali 40', 40', 40'	Stadium: Nonthaburi Stadium; Attendance: 50; Referee: Mohammad Javed Ehtesham (Iran)

24 January 2026 2026 SAFF Championship	Sri Lanka	1–4	India	Bangkok, Thailand
17:30 IST	Mohamed Kursheeth 19'	SAFF; AIFF	Seon D'Souza 3', 20'; Lalsawmpuia 10'; Nikhil Mali 12'	Stadium: Nonthaburi Stadium; Attendance: 19; Referee: Chonlakan Luangsa-Ard (Thailand)

26 January 2026 2026 SAFF Championship	India	4–1	Pakistan	Bangkok, Thailand
17:30 IST	Laltluangzela 6'; Lalsawmpuia 25', 40'; Nikhil Mali 32'	SAFF; AIFF	Ali Agha 19'	Stadium: Nonthaburi Stadium; Attendance: 135; Referee: Chris Sinclair (New Zealand)

=== Result by confederation ===
Confederation	Pld	W	D	L	GF	GA	GD	Win %	First meeting	Last meeting
AFC	16	4	2	10	47	69	–22	25%	2023	2026
CAF	0	0	0	0	0	0	0	0	—N/a	—N/a
CONCACAF	0	0	0	0	0	0	0	0	—N/a	—N/a
CONMEBOL	0	0	0	0	0	0	0	0	—N/a	—N/a
OFC	0	0	0	0	0	0	0	0	—N/a	—N/a
UEFA	0	0	0	0	0	0	0	0	—N/a	—N/a
FIFA	16	4	2	10	47	69	–22	25%	2023	2026

== See also ==
- Indian women's national futsal team results
