= India national futsal team =

Men's national futsal team representing India

India
- Shirt badge/Association crest
- Nickname(s): Futsal Tigers
- Association: All India Football Federation
- Confederation: AFC (Asia); SAFF (South Asia)
- Head coach: Reza Kordi
- Captain: Nikhil Mali
- Most caps: Nikhil Mali (16)
- Top scorer: Nikhil Mali (9)
- FIFA code: IND
- FIFA ranking: 130 (24 September 2026)
- Highest FIFA ranking: 130 (8 May 2026)
- Lowest FIFA ranking: 135 (6 May 2024)
Home colours	Away colours

First international
- Bahrain 3–0 India (Isa Town, Bahrain; 12 August 2023)

Biggest win
- Bhutan 3–11 India (Bangkok, Thailand; 22 January 2026)

Biggest defeat
- India 1–10 Australia (Ardiya, Kuwait; 22 September 2025)

FIFA World Cup
- Appearances: 0

AFC Futsal Asian Cup
- Appearances: 0

SAFF Futsal Championship
- Appearances: 1 (First in 2026)
- Best result: 2nd (2026)

The India national futsal team represents India in international futsal competitions. The team is controlled by the All India Football Federation (AIFF) under the Asian Football Confederation (AFC).

India made its debut against Bahrain in an international friendly on 12 August 2023, losing 3–0. The 2024 AFC Futsal Asian Cup qualification was their first international competition which was held in October 2023.

== History ==
=== Formation, debut and first tournament ===
On 10 December 2019, the then AIFF Executive Committee decided that a futsal club competition would be part of their calendar from 2020–21 season onwards. The club championship, that was conceptualized in 2019, was held for the first time in November 2021 and followed by the second edition in February 2023. Based on the performance of the players in Futsal Club Championship, AIFF scouts selected a 31 members squad for the national team camp for creating the India national futsal team. Victor Hermans as futsal advisor in May 2023, and Joshuah Vaz as head coach in July 2023, were appointed to guide the team for India's first participation in major tournament, the qualification competition for the 2024 AFC Futsal Asian Cup.

In August 2023, the AIFF announced that India would play two international friendlies against Bahrain as a preparation for the AFC Futsal Asian Cup qualification. A fourteen-member squad of the first ever India national team was announced. The team made its debut in a 3–0 loss against Bahrain at Khalifa Sports City Hall in Isa Town on 12 August 2023. In the second match on 14 August, India was defeated again by Bahrain with a bigger scoreline of 4–0.

India was drawn in Group E of the Asian Cup qualification where they faced Tajikistan, Myanmar and Palestine, from 2 to 13 October 2023. In the first match against Tajikistan, India lost 3–6 to the host. David Laltlansanga scored all the goals, thus becoming the first ever goalscorer, as well as scoring the first ever hat-trick for the national team. India again suffered loss in the next two matches, 2–5 to Myanmar and 5–6 to Palestine, thus failing to qualify for the 2024 AFC Futsal Asian Cup. K. Roluahpuia and Nikhil Mali scored twice each, while Laltlansanga scored six goals in this qualifying edition.

=== 2025–present ===
In March 2025, the AIFF announced that India will be participating in the 2026 AFC Futsal Asian Cup qualification. India was drawn in Group A along with Kuwait, Australia and Mongolia. Iranian Reza Kordi was appointed head coach of the national team. As a preparation for the qualifiers, India played two international friendlies against Lebanon, both of which they lost. In the qualifiers, India lost the first match against Kuwait by 1–4; in the second match against Australia on 22 September 2025, India registered its worst defeat of 1–10. However, in the third match India finally registered its first ever win, a 3–0 victory against Mongolia. With just 3 points, India failed to qualify for the 2026 AFC Futsal Asian Cup.

In May 2025, at the South Asian Football Federation (SAFF) Congress in Kathmandu, it was proposed that a SAFF Futsal Championship would be held annually. On 5 October 2025, SAFF announced that the first ever SAFF Futsal Championship for both men and women would be held from 13 to 26 January 2026, in Thailand. The tournament was in round-robin format. With 3 wins, 2 draws and 1 loss, India finished as runners-up. Out of the 3 wins, India's 11–3 victory against Bhutan is their biggest ever win.

== Coaching staff ==
Following is the current coaching staff.

Position	Name
Head coach	(Iran) Reza Kordi
Assistant coach	(Singapore) Hassan Khodabandehloo bin Abolfazl
Goalkeeping coach	(India) Veerababu Sivaneni

== Players ==
=== Current squad ===
Following 14 players were named in the squad for the 2026 SAFF Futsal Championship.

No.	Pos.	Player	Date of birth (age)	Caps	Goals	Club
1	GK	Aleef Rahman Mollah	18 April 2001 (age 25)			(All India Football Federation) Goal Hunterz
2	GK	Ozen Vivian Silva				(All India Football Federation) Ambelim
	DF	Lalsangkima		3	0	(All India Football Federation) Bhawanipore
	DF	Lalsawmpuia		0	0	(All India Football Federation) India
	MF	Anmol Adhikari				(All India Football Federation) Goal Hunterz
	MF	K. Roluahpuia				(All India Football Federation) India
	MF	Seaon D'Souza				(All India Football Federation) Golazo
7	MF	Nikhil Mali (captain)	11 November 1996 (age 30)	16	9	(All India Football Federation) Bhawanipore
	MF	H. Lalrinzuala				(All India Football Federation) India
	MF	Vincent Laltluangzela				(All India Football Federation) India
	FW	Hafis A. M.				(All India Football Federation) India
	FW	Jonathan Lalrawngbawla				(All India Football Federation) India
	FW	Palash Barber				(All India Football Federation) India
	FW	Tijo Job				(All India Football Federation) India

=== Recent callups ===
The following footballers were part of national selection in the past twelve months, but are not part of the current call-up.

Pos.	Player	Date of birth (age)	Caps	Goals	Club	Latest call-up

== Results and fixtures ==
For past match results of the national team, see the team's results page.

Matches in the last 12 months, and future scheduled matches

Win Draw Loss Fixture

=== 2026 ===
14 January 2026 2026 SAFF Championship	India	4–4	Bangladesh	Bangkok, Thailand
15:00 IST	Anmol Adhikari 12'; Lalsawmpuia 20'; K Roluahpuia 27', 36'	Report	Md Moin Ahmed 9', 31'; Md Rahbar Wahed Khan 12'16"	Stadium: Nonthaburi Stadium, Bangkok; Attendance: 70; Referee: Chris Sinclair (England)

18 January 2026 2026 SAFF Championship	India	3–3	Nepal	Bangkok, Thailand
12:30 IST	Laltluangzela 6'; Anmol Adhikari 39'; Nikhil Rajendra Mali 40'	Report	Bikrant Narsing Rana 5'; Amit Lama 25'; Bijay Shrestha 40'	Stadium: Nonthaburi Stadium; Attendance: 56; Referee: Ali Ahmadi (Iran)

20 January 2026 2026 SAFF Championship	Maldives	5–0	India	Bangkok, Thailand
15:00 IST	Mohamed Imran 12', 30'; Abdulla Shafiu 22'; Ali Shamal Abdulla 24'; Ahmed Hameed 40'	Report		Stadium: Nonthaburi Stadium; Attendance: 50; Referee: Ali Hafizi (Iran)

22 January 2026 2026 SAFF Championship	Bhutan	3–11	India	Bangkok, Thailand
17:30 IST	Jigme Tshultrim 11'; Jetsuen Dorji 15'; Nima Wangdi 35'	Report	Jonathan Lalrawngbawla 4'; Jignam Seltob Dorji 6' (o.g.); Laltluangzela 9', 39'; Lalsawmpuia 15'; Anmol Adhikari 17', 32'; Seon D'Souza 34'; Nikhil Mali 40', 40', 40'	Stadium: Nonthaburi Stadium; Attendance: 50; Referee: Mohammad Javed Ehtesham (Iran)

24 January 2026 2026 SAFF Championship	Sri Lanka	1–4	India	Bangkok, Thailand
17:30 IST	Mohamed Kursheeth 19'	Report	Seon D'Souza 3', 20'; Lalsawmpuia 10'; Nikhil Mali 12'	Stadium: Nonthaburi Stadium; Attendance: 19; Referee: Chonlakan Luangsa-Ard (Thailand)

26 January 2026 2026 SAFF Championship	India	4–1	Pakistan	Bangkok, Thailand
17:30 IST	Laltluangzela 6'; Lalsawmpuia 25', 40'; Nikhil Mali 32'	Report	Ali Agha 19'	Stadium: Nonthaburi Stadium; Attendance: 135; Referee: Chris Sinclair (New Zealand)

== Competitive record ==
=== FIFA Futsal World Cup ===
FIFA Futsal World Cup record
Year	Result	Position	Pld	W	T	L	GF	GA
1989–2020	Did not exist							
(Uzbekistan) 2024	Did not qualify							
Total	0/10	0	0	0	0	0	0	0

=== AFC Futsal Asian Cup ===
AFC Futsal Asian Cup record									Qualification record					
Year	Result	Position	Pld	W	T	L	GF	GA	Pld	W	T	L	GF	GA
1999–2022	Did not exist								Did not exist					
(Thailand) 2024	Did not qualify								3	0	0	3	10	17
(Indonesia) 2026	Did not qualify								3	1	0	2	5	14
Total	0/18	0	0	0	0	0	0	0	6	1	0	5	15	31

=== SAFF Futsal Championship ===
SAFF Futsal Championship records
Host/Year	Round	Position	GP	W	D	L	GF	GA
(Thailand) 2026	Runners-up	2nd	6	3	2	1	26	17
Total	Runners-up	2nd	6	3	2	1	26	17

=== Overall competitive record ===
As of 24 September 2025 (excluding friendlies & minor tournaments)

Competition	Pld	W	D	L	GF	GA	GD	Win%
AFC Futsal Asian Cup qualification	6	1	0	5	15	31	−16	16.67
SAFF Futsal Championship	6	3	2	1	26	17	+9	50.00
Total	12	4	2	6	41	48	−7	33.33

== Head-to-head record ==
As of 26 January 2025 vs Pakistan

The following table shows India's head-to-head records. (includes all matches)

Positive record
Neutral record
Negative record

Opponent	Pld	W	D	L	GF	GA	GD	Win %
Australia	1	0	0	1	1	10	−9	0.00
Bahrain	2	0	0	2	0	7	−7	0.00
Bangladesh	1	0	1	0	4	4	+0	0.00
Bhutan	1	1	0	0	11	3	+8	100.00
Kuwait	1	0	0	1	1	4	−3	0.00
Lebanon	2	0	0	2	6	14	−8	0.00
Maldives	1	0	0	1	0	5	−5	0.00
Mongolia	1	1	0	0	3	0	+3	100.00
Myanmar	1	0	0	1	2	5	−3	0.00
Nepal	1	0	1	0	3	3	+0	0.00
Pakistan	1	1	0	0	4	1	+3	100.00
Palestine	1	0	0	1	5	6	−1	0.00
Sri Lanka	1	1	0	0	4	1	+3	100.00
Tajikistan	1	0	0	1	3	6	−3	0.00
Total	16	4	2	10	47	69	−22	25.00

== See also ==
- Futsal Club Championship
- Futsal Association of India
- Football in India
- History of Indian football
- India national football team
- India women's national football team
- Sport in India
