= 2026 SAFF Futsal Championship squads =

The following squads were announced for the tournament. Each team is permitted to register their official player lineup and coaching staff.

== Bangladesh ==
Bangladesh announced their final squad on 23 December 2025.

Head coach: (Iran) Saeid Khodarahmi

Note: Flags indicate national team as defined under FIFA eligibility rules; some limited exceptions apply. Players may hold more than one non-FIFA nationality.

No.	Pos.	Nation	Player
1		BAN	Rahbar Khan (Captain)
2		BAN	Intishar Mostafa Chowdhury
3		BAN	Md Tuhin
4		BAN	Kazi Ibrahim Ahamed
5		BAN	Md Rashedol Islam
6		BAN	Mo Moin Ahmed
7		BAN	Tajware Bin Kashem
8		BAN	Foayej Ahammed

No.	Pos.	Nation	Player
9		BAN	Iman Mohammed Alam
10		BAN	Foysal Hossain
11		BAN	Fayed Azim
12		BAN	Md Abir Hossain
13		BAN	Rayan Mahabub Chowdhury
14	GK	BAN	Md Jahid Hasan Rabbi
15	GK	BAN	Md Jannatul Naym Parvege
16	GK	BAN	Tannuv Mehatab

== Bhutan ==
Bhutan's final squad was announced on 24 December 2025.

Head coach: (Bhutan) Passang Tshering

Note: Flags indicate national team as defined under FIFA eligibility rules; some limited exceptions apply. Players may hold more than one non-FIFA nationality.

No.	Pos.	Nation	Player
—		BHU	Ajay Gurung
—		BHU	Kelzang Dorji
—		BHU	Nima Wangdi
—	GK	BHU	Rigzin Sonam Tenzin
—		BHU	Jitsuen Dorji
—		BHU	Dechen Jigdrel
—		BHU	Dilip Monger

No.	Pos.	Nation	Player
—		BHU	Kinley Rabgay
—	GK	BHU	Gyeltshen Zangpo
—		BHU	Jigme Tsheltrim
—		BHU	Dawa Tshering
—	GK	BHU	Tashi Norbu
—		BHU	Jignam Seltop Dorji
—		BHU	Kinga Wangchuk (Captain)

== India ==
India named their final squad on 6 January 2026.

Head coach: (Iran) Reza Kordi

Note: Flags indicate national team as defined under FIFA eligibility rules; some limited exceptions apply. Players may hold more than one non-FIFA nationality.

No.	Pos.	Nation	Player
—	GK	IND	Aleef Rahman Mollah
—	GK	IND	Ozen Vivian Silva
—		IND	Lalsangkima
—		IND	Lalsawmpuia
—		IND	Anmol Adhikari
—		IND	K. Roluahpuia
—		IND	Seaon D'Souza

No.	Pos.	Nation	Player
—		IND	Nikhil Mali (Captain)
—		IND	H. Lalrinzuala
—		IND	Vincent Laltluangzela
—		IND	Hafis A. M.
—		IND	Jonathan Lalrawngbawla
—		IND	Palash Barber
—		IND	Tijo Job

== Maldives ==
Maldives named their final lineup on 7 January 2026.

Head coach: (Uzbekistan) Farrukh Zakirov

Note: Flags indicate national team as defined under FIFA eligibility rules; some limited exceptions apply. Players may hold more than one non-FIFA nationality.

No.	Pos.	Nation	Player
—	GK	MDV	Ibrahim Naajihu
—	GK	MDV	Zaidhaan Ahmed
—		MDV	Ali Shiyah
—		MDV	Ahmed Hameed
—		MDV	Ishan Ibrahim
—		MDV	Hussain Shareef
—		MDV	Mohamed Imran (Captain)

No.	Pos.	Nation	Player
—		MDV	Abdulla Shafiu
—		MDV	Hussain Suhail
—		MDV	Huzaifath Rasheed
—		MDV	Ahmed Rahil Rasheed
—		MDV	Abdulla Junaid
—		MDV	Ali Haisam
—		MDV	Ali Shamal Abdulla

== Nepal ==
Nepal's squad was announced on 7 January 2026.

Head coach: (Nepal) Anil Bahadur Gurung

Note: Flags indicate national team as defined under FIFA eligibility rules; some limited exceptions apply. Players may hold more than one non-FIFA nationality.

No.	Pos.	Nation	Player
—		NEP	Amit Lama
—		NEP	Ashok Darlami
—		NEP	Bijay Shrestha (Captain)
—		NEP	Bikrant Narsing Rana
—		NEP	Bishal Saru Magar
—	GK	NEP	Dipesh Shrestha
—		NEP	Jenish Prajapati

No.	Pos.	Nation	Player
—		NEP	Lakpa Tamang
—	GK	NEP	Padam Tamang
—		NEP	Pemba Dorje Lama
—		NEP	Sanje Syangtan
—		NEP	Saroj Tamang
—		NEP	Subet Lama
—		NEP	Suraj Gurung

== Pakistan ==
Pakistan's squad was announced on 9 January 2026.

Head coach: (Iran) Ali Imani

Note: Flags indicate national team as defined under FIFA eligibility rules; some limited exceptions apply. Players may hold more than one non-FIFA nationality.

No.	Pos.	Nation	Player
—	GK	PAK	Muhammad Tahir
—		PAK	Abdul Wadud
—		PAK	Muhammad Humza Khan
—		PAK	Asif Ahmad Chaudhry
—		PAK	Salar Ahmed Khan
—		PAK	Muhammad Adan Ashfaq
—		PAK	Muhammad Hassaan Zafar Khan (Captain)

No.	Pos.	Nation	Player
—		PAK	Hamza Nusrat
—		PAK	Ali Agha
—		PAK	Nisar Hussain
—		PAK	Abdul Hannan
—		PAK	Zaid Ullah Khan
—		PAK	Muhammad Ellham
—		PAK	Rajab Ali

== Sri Lanka ==
Sri Lanka's squad was announced on 11 January 2026.

Head coach: (Qatar) Ahmed Al Mannai

Note: Flags indicate national team as defined under FIFA eligibility rules; some limited exceptions apply. Players may hold more than one non-FIFA nationality.

No.	Pos.	Nation	Player
1	GK	SRI	Mohamed Mursith
2		SRI	Ahamed Shareef
3		SRI	Sivanathan Aarnikan
4		SRI	Woranda Manaram Perera
5		SRI	Mohamed Nilar Nadeem Ahamad
6		SRI	Fareeq Ahamedh
7		SRI	Mohamed Aakib

No.	Pos.	Nation	Player
8		SRI	Mohamed Aman (Captain)
9		SRI	Marshuk Firas Zeer
10		SRI	Mohamed Kursheeth
11		SRI	Naveen Jude Nicholas
12		SRI	Mohammed Thilham
13		SRI	Ashkar Ahmed
14		SRI	Abdul Azeez
