= 2026 SAFF Futsal Championship =

International futsal competition

Tournament details
- Host country: Thailand
- Dates: 14–26 January 2026
- Teams: 7 (from 1 sub-confederation)
- Venues: 2 (in 1 host city)

Final positions
- Champions: Maldives (1st title)
- Runners-up: India
- Third place: Nepal

Tournament statistics
- Matches played: 21
- Goals scored: 129 (6.14 per match)
- Attendance: 1,360 (65 per match)
- Top scorer(s): (Maldives) Mohamed Imran (9 goals in 6 matches)

The 2026 SAFF Futsal Championship was the inaugural edition of the SAFF Futsal Championship, the biennial international futsal championship organised by the South Asian Football Federation (SAFF) for the men's national teams of South Asia region countries. The tournament was played in Bangkok, Thailand from 14 to 26 January 2026.

The championship will be accompanied by capacity-building courses for coaches and referees, aimed at strengthening the foundation of futsal in the region.

== Venue ==
SAFF General Secretary, Purushottam Kattel, stated that Thailand was selected for its infrastructure, accessibility, and the limited futsal experience among member nations. He noted that potential India–Pakistan complications were also a factor in the decision.

Venues in Thailand
| Bangkok | | 2026 SAFF Futsal Championship (Thailand) |
|---|---|---|
| Nonthaburi Stadium | Hua Mak Indoor Stadium | 2026 SAFF Futsal Championship (Thailand) |
| Capacity: 4,000 | Capacity: 8,000 | 2026 SAFF Futsal Championship (Thailand) |
| Nonthaburi Province Stadium outside image | | 2026 SAFF Futsal Championship (Thailand) |

== Participating teams ==
All the seven member states made their debut in the inaugural edition.

| Country | Appearance | Previous best | FIFA Futsal ranking (December 2025) |
|---|---|---|---|
| Bangladesh | 1st (Debut) | —N/a | 139 |
| Bhutan | 1st (Debut) | —N/a | NR |
| India | 1st (Debut) | —N/a | 133 |
| Maldives | 1st (Debut) | —N/a | 109 |
| Nepal | 1st (Debut) | —N/a | 114 |
| Pakistan | 1st (Debut) | —N/a | 138 |
| Sri Lanka | 1st (Debut) | —N/a | NR |

== Match officials ==
Due to the limited number of SAFF futsal referees, SAFF appointed 10 futsal referees to officiate the tournament, nine of whom were from outside the regional body.

Referees

- (Australia) Nicholas Backo
- (Iran) Ali Ahmadi
- (Iran) Mohammad Javed Ehtesham
- (Iran) Ali Hafizi
- (India) Vaja Vishal Mahendrabhai
- (Lao Football Federation) Khampasong Xayavongsy
- (New Zealand) Chris Sinclair
- (Thailand) Benjapol Mucharoennsap
- (Thailand) Chonlakan Luangsa-Ard
- (Football Association of Thailand) Nattakit Hintua

Match Commissioners

- (India) De Sousa Jonathan
- (India) Bhattachrya Arunava
- (Bhutan) D. Tashi Wangmo
- (Maldives) Shahir Ahmed

Referee Accessors

- (Iran) Mahmoud Reza Nasirlou
- (Thailand) Presser Krutsri

== Standings ==
| Pos | Team | Pld | W | D | L | GF | GA | GD | Pts | Result | MDV | IND | NEP | PAK | BAN | SRI | BHU |
|---|---|---|---|---|---|---|---|---|---|---|---|---|---|---|---|---|---|
| 1 | Maldives (C) | 6 | 6 | 0 | 0 | 28 | 6 | +22 | 18 | Champions | | 5–0 | 2–1 | | 6–1 | | |
| 2 | India | 6 | 3 | 2 | 1 | 26 | 17 | +9 | 11 | Runners-up | | | 3–3 | 4–1 | 4–4 | | |
| 3 | Nepal | 6 | 3 | 2 | 1 | 18 | 12 | +6 | 11 | Third-place | | | | | | | |
| 4 | Pakistan | 6 | 3 | 1 | 2 | 20 | 20 | 0 | 10 | | 1–7 | | 4–4 | | | 5–2 | 4–2 |
| 5 | Bangladesh | 6 | 2 | 1 | 3 | 16 | 21 | −5 | 7 | | | | 1–4 | 1–5 | | 5–1 | 4–1 |
| 6 | Sri Lanka | 6 | 0 | 1 | 5 | 10 | 24 | −14 | 1 | | 2–5 | 1–4 | 1–2 | | | | 3–3 |
| 7 | Bhutan | 6 | 0 | 1 | 5 | 11 | 29 | −18 | 1 | | 1–3 | 3–11 | 1–4 | | | | |

Source: GSA
Legend: Blue = home team win; Yellow = draw; Red = away team win.
(C) Champions

== Matches ==
The SAFF had released its official match schedule for the season, detailing dates, venues, and kickoff times for all the matches.

14 January 2026
14:00
Match 1

| Sri Lanka | 3–3 | Bhutan |
|---|---|---|
| Mohamed Aakib 8', 18'; Mohammed Thilham 36' | Report | Jetsuen Dorji 2'; Nima 9'; Dawa 38' |

Nonthaburi Stadium, Bangkok, Thailand
Attendance: 75
Referee: Ali Ahmadi (Iran)
14 January 2026
16:30
Match 2

| India | 4–4 | Bangladesh |
|---|---|---|
| Anmol Adhikari 12'; Lalsawmpuia 20'; K Roluahpuia 27', 36' | Report | Moin Ahmed 9', 31'; Rahbar 16', 37' |

Nonthaburi Stadium, Bangkok, Thailand
Attendance: 70
Referee: Chris Sinclair (New Zealand)
14 January 2026
19:00
Match 3

| Pakistan | 1–7 | Maldives |
|---|---|---|
| Nisar Hussain 26' | Report | Ahmed Hameed 7'; Ali Shiyah 10'; Mohamed Imran 12', 24'; Zaidhaan Ahmed 20'; Shamal 20'; Abdulla Shafiu 33' |

Nonthaburi Stadium, Bangkok, Thailand
Attendance: 50
Referee: Benjapol Mucharoennsap (Thailand)

16 January 2026
14:00
Match 4

| Sri Lanka | 1–2 | Nepal |
|---|---|---|
| Mohamed Kursheeth 10' | Report | Saroj Tamang 15', 21' |

Hua Mak Indoor Stadium, Bangkok, Thailand
Attendance: 50
Referee: Chonlakan Luangsa-Ard (Thailand)
16 January 2026
16:30
Match 5

| Pakistan | 4–2 | Bhutan |
|---|---|---|
| Hassaan Zafar 28'; Asif Ahmad 32'; Adan Ashfaq 34', 35' | Report | Dawa 12', 13' |

Hua Mak Indoor Stadium, Bangkok, Thailand
Attendance: 50
Referee: Ali Hafizi (Iran)
16 January 2026
19:00
Match 6

| Maldives | 6–1 | Bangladesh |
|---|---|---|
| Mohamed Imran 1'; Ishan Ibrahim 9'; Ahmed Rahil Rasheed 10', 31'; Ali Shiyah 16' (pen.); Abdulla Shafiu 40' | Report | Kazi Ibrahim Ahamed 20' |

Hua Mak Indoor Stadium, Bangkok, Thailand
Attendance: 100
Referee: Ali Ahmadi (Iran)

18 January 2026
14:00
Match 7

| India | 3–3 | Nepal |
|---|---|---|
| Laltluangzela 6'; Anmol Adhikari 39'; Nikhil 40' | Report | Bikrant 5'; Amit Lama 25'; Bijay Shrestha 40' |

Nonthaburi Stadium, Bangkok, Thailand
Attendance: 56
Referee: Ali Ahmadi (Iran)
18 January 2026
16:30
Match 8

| Pakistan | 5–2 | Sri Lanka |
|---|---|---|
| Hamza Nusrat 2'; Ali Agha 7', 39'; Hassaan Zafar 30'; Asif Ahmad 34' | Report | Mohamed Aakib 34'; Abdul Azeez 40' |

Nonthaburi Stadium, Bangkok, Thailand
Attendance: 50
Referee: Mohammad Javed Ehtesham (Iran)
18 January 2026
19:00
Match 9

| Bangladesh | 4–1 | Bhutan |
|---|---|---|
| Moin Ahmed 5', 10'; Md Foysal Hossain 35'; Kazi Ibrahim Ahamed 36' | Report | Kinga 29' |

Nonthaburi Stadium, Bangkok, Thailand
Attendance: 85
Referee: Chris Sinclair (New Zealand)

20 January 2026
14:00
Match 10

| Pakistan | 4–4 | Nepal |
|---|---|---|
| Muhammad Ellham 25'; Nisar Hussain 33'; Asif Ahmad 34'; Hassaan Zafar 37' | Report | Bikrant 1', 19'; Jenish Prajapati 24'; Suraj Gurung 32' |

Nonthaburi Stadium, Bangkok, Thailand
Attendance: 52
Referee: Benjapol Mucharoennsap (Thailand)
20 January 2026
16:30
Match 11

| Maldives | 5–0 | India |
|---|---|---|
| Mohamed Imran 12', 30'; Abdulla Shafiu 22'; Shamal 24'; Ahmed Hameed 40' | Report |

Nonthaburi Stadium, Bangkok, Thailand
Attendance: 50
Referee: Ali Hafizi (Iran)
20 January 2026
19:00
Match 12

| Bangladesh | 5–1 | Sri Lanka |
|---|---|---|
| Rahbar 4', 19'; Moin Ahmed 22'; Tajware Bin Kashem 34'; Abir Hossain 39' | Report | Faizer 5' |

Nonthaburi Stadium, Bangkok, Thailand
Attendance: 51
Referee: Nattakit Hintua (Thailand)

22 January 2026
14:00
Match 13

| Maldives | 2–1 | Nepal |
|---|---|---|
| Abdulla Shafiu 23'; Mohamed Imran 33' | Report | Bikrant 24' |

Nonthaburi Stadium, Bangkok, Thailand
Attendance: 150
Referee: Ali Hafizi (Iran)
22 January 2026
16:30
Match 14

| Bangladesh | 1–5 | Pakistan |
|---|---|---|
| Fayed Azim 36' | Report | Ali Agha 18', 40'; Zaid Ullah Khan 31', 40'; Salar Ahmed Khan 37' |

Nonthaburi Stadium, Bangkok, Thailand
Attendance: 23
Referee: Chris Sinclair (New Zealand)
22 January 2026
19:00
Match 15

| Bhutan | 3–11 | India |
|---|---|---|
| Jigme Tshultrim 11'; Jetsuen Dorji 15'; Nima 35' | Report | Jonathan Lalrawngbawla 4'; Jignam Seltob Dorji 6' (o.g.); Laltluangzela 9', 39'; Lalsawmpuia 15'; Anmol Adhikari 17', 32'; Seon D'Souza 34'; Nikhil 40', 40', 40' |

Nonthaburi Stadium, Bangkok, Thailand
Attendance: 50
Referee: Mohammad Javed Ehtesham (Iran)

24 January 2026
14:00
Match 16

| Bangladesh | 1–4 | Nepal |
|---|---|---|
| Rahbar Khan 34' | Report | Lakpa Tamang 14'; Saroj Tamang 29'; Sanje Syangtan 35'; Bikrant 37' |

Nonthaburi Stadium, Bangkok, Thailand
Attendance: 36
Referee: Khamprasong Xayavongsy (Laos)
24 January 2026
16:30
Match 17

| Bhutan | 1–3 | Maldives |
|---|---|---|
| Jigme Tshultrim 12' | Report | Abdulla Junaid 19'; Ahmed Hameed 23'; Mohamed Imran 36' |

Nonthaburi Stadium, Bangkok, Thailand
Attendance: 100
Referee: Ali Ahmadi (Iran)
24 January 2026
19:00
Match 18

| Sri Lanka | 1–4 | India |
|---|---|---|
| Mohamed Kursheeth 19' | Report | Seon D'Souza 3', 20'; Lalsawmpuia 10'; Nikhil 12' |

Nonthaburi Stadium, Bangkok, Thailand
Attendance: 19
Referee: Chonlakan Luangsa-Ard (Thailand)

26 January 2026
14:00
Match 19

| Bhutan | 1–4 | Nepal |
|---|---|---|
| Jetsuen Dorji 16' | Report | Bijay Shrestha 21'; Pemba Dorje Lama 25', 31'; Saroj Tamang 38' |

Nonthaburi Stadium, Bangkok, Thailand
Attendance: 58
Referee: Ali Hafizi (Iran)
26 January 2026
16:30
Match 20

| Sri Lanka | 2–5 | Maldives |
|---|---|---|
| Mohammed Thilham 17'; Mohamed Aman 26' | Report | Mohamed Imran 12', 36'; Huzaifath Rasheed 20'; Mohamed Aakib 29' (o.g.); Hussain Suhail 34' |

Nonthaburi Stadium, Bangkok, Thailand
Attendance: 50
Referee: Nicholas Backo (Australia)
26 January 2026
19:00
Match 21

| India | 4–1 | Pakistan |
|---|---|---|
| Laltluangzela 6'; Lalsawmpuia 25', 40'; Nikhil Mali 32' | Report | Ali Agha 19' |

Nonthaburi Stadium, Bangkok, Thailand
Attendance: 135
Referee: Chris Sinclair (New Zealand)

== Statistics ==
=== Goalscorers ===
There were 129 goals scored in 21 matches, for an average of 6.14 goals per match.

9 goals

- (Maldives) Mohamed Imran

6 goals

- (India) Nikhil Mali

5 goals

- (Bangladesh) Moin Ahmed
- (Bangladesh) Rahbar Khan
- (India) Lalsawmpuia
- (Nepal) Bikrant Narsingh Rana
- (Pakistan) Ali Agha

4 goals

- (Maldives) Abdulla Shafiu
- (India) Anmol Adhikari
- (India) Laltluangzela
- (Nepal) Saroj Tamang

3 goals

- (Maldives) Ahmed Hameed
- (Bhutan) Dawa Kuenjung Tshering
- (Bhutan) Jetsuen Dorji
- (India) Seon D'Souza
- (Pakistan) Asif Ahmad
- (Pakistan) Hassaan Zafar
- (Sri Lanka) Mohamed Aakib Faizal

2 goals

- (Bangladesh) Fayed Azim
- (Bangladesh) Kazi Ibrahim Ahamed
- (Bhutan) Nima Wangdi
- (India) K Roluahpuia
- (Maldives) Ahmed Rahil Rasheed
- (Maldives) Ali Shamal Abdulla
- (Maldives) Ali Shiyah
- (Nepal) Bijay Shrestha
- (Nepal) Pemba Dorje Lama
- (Pakistan) Adan Ashfaq
- (Pakistan) Nisar Hussain
- (Pakistan) Zaid Ullah Khan
- (Sri Lanka) Mohamed Kursheeth
- (Sri Lanka) Mohamed Aman Faizer
- (Sri Lanka) Mohammed Thilham

1 goal

- (Bangladesh) Abir Hossain
- (Bangladesh) Md Foysal Hossain
- (Bangladesh) Tajware Bin Kashem
- (Bhutan) Jigme Tshultrim
- (Bhutan) Kinga Wingchuk
- (India) Jonathan Lalrawngbawla
- (Nepal) Amit Lama
- (Nepal) Jenish Prajapati
- (Nepal) Suraj Gurung
- (Nepal) Sanje Syangtan
- (Nepal) Lakpa Tamang
- (Maldives) Ishan Ibrahim
- (Maldives) Zaidhaan Ahmed
- (Maldives) Huzaifath Rasheed
- (Maldives) Hussain Suhail
- (Maldives) Abdulla Junaid
- (Pakistan) Hamza Nusrat
- (Pakistan) Muhammad Ellham
- (Pakistan) Salar Ahmed Khan
- (Sri Lanka) Abdul Azeez Mohamed Azmeer

1 own goal

- (Bhutan) Jignam Seltob Dorji (against India)
- (Sri Lanka) Mohamed Aakib (against Maldives)

== Broadcasting ==
| Territory | Broadcaster(s) | Notes |
|---|---|---|
| No restricted territory | Sportzworkz^{(YouTube channel)} | 2026 SAFF Futsal matches's channel on YouTube |

== See also ==
- 2026 SAFF U-17 Championship
- 2026 SAFF U-20 Championship
- 2026 SAFF U-23 Championship
- 2026 SAFF Championship
- 2026 SAFF Club Championship
- 2026 SAFF Women's Championship
- 2026 SAFF Women's Futsal Championship
