= 2026 AFC Futsal Asian Cup qualification =

International futsal competition

Tournament details
- Host countries: Kuwait (Group A); Thailand (Group B); Tajikistan (Group C); Saudi Arabia (Group D); China (Group E); Kyrgyzstan (Group F); Malaysia (Group G); Myanmar (Group H)
- Dates: 20–24 September 2025 (Groups A–C & E–H); 18–22 October 2025 (Group D)
- Teams: 31 (from 1 confederation)

Tournament statistics
- Matches played: 45
- Goals scored: 296 (6.58 per match)

The 2026 AFC Futsal Asian Cup qualification was the qualification process organized by the Asian Football Confederation (AFC) to determine the participating teams for the 2026 AFC Futsal Asian Cup, the 18th edition of the international men's futsal championship of Asia.

A total of 16 teams qualified to play in the final tournament. The host country Indonesia qualified automatically, while the other 15 teams were decided by qualification, with the matches played between 20 and 24 September 2025 in centralised venues.

== Draw ==
There are 31 teams that confirm their participation in the qualifiers. For the first time, the seeding for the draw will be based on the FIFA Futsal Men's World Ranking on 4 April 2025 (shown in parentheses below). The draw was held on 26 June 2025 at the AFC House in Kuala Lumpur, Malaysia.

	Pot 1	Pot 2	Pot 3	Pot 4
Host teams	2. **Thailand** (11) **(H)**; 7. **Kuwait** (40) **(H)**	9. **Tajikistan** (44) **(H)**; 10. **Kyrgyzstan** (48) **(H)**; 11. **Saudi Arabia** (50) **(H)**; 14. Myanmar (56) **(H)**; 16. **Malaysia** (76) **(H)**	17. China (79) **(H)**	
Remaining teams	1. **Iran** (5); 3. **Japan** (13); 4. **Uzbekistan** (23); 5. **Vietnam** (31); 6. **Afghanistan** (33); 8. **Iraq** (41)	12. **Australia** (52); 13. **Lebanon** (53); 15. **South Korea** (70)	18. Chinese Taipei (82); 19. Bahrain (83); 20. United Arab Emirates (97); 21. Maldives (106); 22. Timor-Leste (109); 23. Mongolia (112); 24. Macau (115)	25. Hong Kong (118); 26. Brunei (119); 27. Palestine (121); 28. Cambodia (125); 29. India (135); 30. Bangladesh (NR); 31. Pakistan (NR)

Did not enter

- Laos (65)
- Turkmenistan (67)
- Jordan (78)
- Qatar (92)
- Philippines (95)
- Oman (96)
- Nepal (120)
- Bhutan (NR)
- Guam (NR)
- North Korea (NR)
- Singapore (NR)
- Sri Lanka (NR)
- Syria (NR)
- Yemen (NR)
- Northern Mariana Islands (N/A)

Notes

- Teams in **bold** qualified for the final tournament.
- (H): Qualification group hosts.
- (NR): Not Ranked.

== Groups ==
=== Tiebreakers ===
Teams are ranked according to points (3 points for a win, 1 point for a draw, 0 points for a loss), and if tied on points, the following tiebreaking criteria are applied, in the order given, to determine the rankings:

1. Points in head-to-head matches among tied teams;
2. Goal difference in head-to-head matches among tied teams;
3. Goals scored in head-to-head matches among tied teams;
4. If more than two teams were tied, and after applying all head-to-head criteria above, a subset of teams are still tied, all head-to-head criteria above are reapplied exclusively to this subset of teams;
5. Goal difference in all group matches;
6. Goals scored in all group matches;
7. Penalty shoot-out if only two teams are tied and they are playing each other in the last round of the group;
8. Disciplinary points (yellow card = −1 point, red card as a result of two yellow cards = −3 points, direct red card = −3 points, yellow card followed by direct red card = −4 points);
9. Drawing of lots.

=== Group A ===
Pos	Team	Pld	W	D	L	GF	GA	GD	Pts	Qualification
1	Australia	3	2	1	0	20	4	+16	7	Final tournament
2	Kuwait (H)	3	2	1	0	12	5	+7	7	Final tournament
3	India	3	1	0	2	5	14	−9	3	
4	Mongolia	3	0	0	3	3	17	−14	0	

Source: AFC
Rules for classification: Qualification tiebreakers
(H) Hosts
20 September 2025
16:00

Australia	8–1	Mongolia
	Report

Qushaian Al-Mutairi Hall, Ardiya
20 September 2025
20:00

Kuwait	4–1	India
Fadhel 10'; Sarraj 18'; Ajmi 27'; Basi 37'	Report	Laltlansanga 9'

Qushaian Al-Mutairi Hall, Ardiya

22 September 2025
16:00

India	1–10	Australia
D'Souza 15'	Report	Rogan 5', 32'; Kouta 5'; Sewell 11', 32'; Garner 17'; Guerreiro 18', 35'; Giovenali 20'

Qushaian Al-Mutairi Hall, Ardiya
22 September 2025
20:00

Mongolia	2–6	Kuwait
	Report

Qushaian Al-Mutairi Hall, Ardiya

24 September 2025
16:00

Mongolia	0–3	India
	Report	D'Souza 17', 33'; A. Adhikari 35'

Qushaian Al-Mutairi Hall, Ardiya
24 September 2025
20:00

Kuwait	2–2	Australia
	Report

Qushaian Al-Mutairi Hall, Ardiya

=== Group B ===
Pos	Team	Pld	W	D	L	GF	GA	GD	Pts	Qualification
1	Thailand (H)	3	2	1	0	21	3	+18	7	Final tournament
2	South Korea	3	2	1	0	7	2	+5	7	Final tournament
3	Bahrain	3	1	0	2	9	6	+3	3	
4	Brunei	3	0	0	3	1	27	−26	0	

Source: AFC
Rules for classification: Qualification tiebreakers
(H) Hosts
20 September 2025
16:30

South Korea	2–0	Bahrain
Kang Ju-kwang 26'; Shin Jong-hoon 38'	Report

Nonthaburi Stadium, Nonthaburi
20 September 2025
19:30

Thailand	15–1	Brunei
Muhammad 3', 13', 23', 23'; Teerapat 4', 24'; Chaowala 6', 17', 18'; Worasak 7'; Anantachai 10'; Itticha 10'; Amarin 27'; Alongkorn 29'; Atippong 40'	Report	Teerapat 24' (o.g.)

Nonthaburi Stadium, Nonthaburi

22 September 2025
16:30

Brunei	0–3	South Korea
	Report	Eom Ji-yong 6'; Kim Eun-soo 20'; Amirul Syami Adillah Helmi 35' (o.g.)

Nonthaburi Stadium, Nonthaburi
22 September 2025
19:30

Bahrain	0–4	Thailand
	Report	Ammar Hasan Ali 4' (o.g.); Ronnachai 8'; Atippong 22'; Muhammad 30'

Nonthaburi Stadium, Nonthaburi

24 September 2025
16:30

Bahrain	9–0	Brunei
Salman Maula Muhammad 2', 7', 17', 18'; Ammar Hasan Ali 8', 18'; Ahmed Mohamed Antar 10'; Mohamed Abdulla Ali 22'; Ali Alaraibi 33'	Report

Nonthaburi Stadium, Nonthaburi
24 September 2025
19:30

Thailand	2–2	South Korea
Teerapat 25'; Muhammad 33'	Report	Kim Gun-woo 7'; Lee Han-wool 30'

Nonthaburi Stadium, Nonthaburi

=== Group C ===
Pos	Team	Pld	W	D	L	GF	GA	GD	Pts	Qualification
1	Japan	3	3	0	0	21	1	+20	9	Final tournament
2	Tajikistan (H)	3	2	0	1	18	6	+12	6	Final tournament
3	Cambodia	3	1	0	2	12	14	−2	3	
4	Macau	3	0	0	3	4	34	−30	0	

Source: AFC
Rules for classification: Qualification tiebreakers
(H) Hosts
20 September 2025
17:00

Japan	5–0	Cambodia
Shoto Yamanaka 5', 27'; Takehiro Motoishi 6'; Shunta Uchida 7', 7'	Report

Dushanbe Indoor Hall, Dushanbe
20 September 2025
20:00

Tajikistan	10–2	Macau
Dilshod Salomov 3'; Samandar Rizomov 4', 29'; Nasratsho Ismoilov 5'; Idris Yorov 8', 24', 25', 26'; Nekruz Idiev 21', 37'	Report	Fong Chi Wa 29', 37' (pen.)

Dushanbe Indoor Hall, Dushanbe

22 September 2025
17:00

Macau	0–13	Japan
	Report	Takehiro Motoishi 1'; Yusei Arai 7', 16', 26', 27', 35'; Shunta Uchida 14', 24'; Shunta Uchimura 15'; Shoto Yamanaka 20', 29'; Kokoro Harada 25'; Kazuya Shimizu 31'

Dushanbe Indoor Hall, Dushanbe
22 September 2025
20:00

Cambodia	1–7	Tajikistan
Keo Sochetra 15'	Report	Samandar Rizomov 4'; Idris Yorov 8'; Nasratsho Ismoilov 12'; Umed Kuziev 18', 39'; Muhamadjon Sharipov 27' (pen.); Firuz Bekmurodov 35'

Dushanbe Indoor Hall, Dushanbe

24 September 2025
17:00

Macau	2–11	Cambodia
Leong Hou In 32'; Fong Chi Wa 35'	Report	Chen Sovanhang 7', 15'; Chuop Seyha 11', 33', 39'; Danyth Saray 16'; Keo Cheatuo 23', 40'; Keo Sochetra 24'; Ros Simchamroeun 25'; Ros Sirotha 40'

Dushanbe Indoor Hall, Dushanbe
24 September 2025
20:00

Japan	3–1	Tajikistan
Sora Kanazawa 24'; Mitsuru Nakamura 30'; Kazuya Shimizu 40'	Report	Samandar Rizomov 13'

Dushanbe Indoor Hall, Dushanbe

=== Group D ===
Pos	Team	Pld	W	D	L	GF	GA	GD	Pts	Qualification
1	Iraq	3	3	0	0	14	2	+12	9	Final tournament
2	Saudi Arabia (H)	3	2	0	1	19	2	+17	6	Final tournament
3	Chinese Taipei	3	1	0	2	4	9	−5	3	
4	Pakistan	3	0	0	3	1	25	−24	0	

Source: AFC
Rules for classification: Qualification tiebreakers
(H) Hosts
18 October 2025
15:00

Iraq	8–1	Pakistan
	Report

Prince Nayef Sports City Hall, Dammam
18 October 2025
18:00

Saudi Arabia	5–0	Chinese Taipei
Muhalhil 1', 15', 29'; Alotaibi 30' (pen.); Aldahhan 39'	Report

Prince Nayef Sports City Hall, Dammam

20 October 2025
15:00

Chinese Taipei	0–4	Iraq
	Report	Majed 24', 37'; Kadhim 28'; Faisal 39'

Prince Nayef Sports City Hall, Dammam
20 October 2025
18:00

Pakistan	0–13	Saudi Arabia
	Report

Prince Nayef Sports City Hall, Dammam

22 October 2025
15:00

Chinese Taipei	4–0	Pakistan
Yousaf Ahmad 10' (o.g.); Hsieh Chin-Cheng 22'; Huang Wei-Lun 26'; Lin Kuan-Ting 36'	Report

Prince Nayef Sports City Hall, Dammam
22 October 2025
18:00

Iraq	2–1	Saudi Arabia
	Report

Prince Nayef Sports City Hall, Dammam

=== Group E ===
Pos	Team	Pld	W	D	L	GF	GA	GD	Pts	Qualification
1	Vietnam	3	3	0	0	20	3	+17	9	Final tournament
2	Lebanon	3	1	1	1	3	6	−3	4	Final tournament
3	China (H)	3	1	0	2	7	9	−2	3	
4	Hong Kong	3	0	1	2	2	14	−12	1	

Source: AFC
Rules for classification: Qualification tiebreakers
(H) Hosts
20 September 2025
15:30

Vietnam	9–1	Hong Kong
Châu Đoàn Phát 5'; Nguyễn Thịnh Phát 6'; Nhan Gia Hưng 10'; Nguyễn Đa Hải 18'; Phạm Đức Hòa 19'; Từ Minh Quang 21', 33', 40'; Nguyễn Mạnh Dũng 33'	Report	Tsang Tsz Hin 21'

Linping Sports Centre Gymnasium, Hangzhou
20 September 2025
19:30

Lebanon	2–1	China
Rhyem 8'; Ossman 36'	Report	Yakepujiang 37'

Linping Sports Centre Gymnasium, Hangzhou

22 September 2025
15:30

Hong Kong	1–1	Lebanon
	Report

Linping Sports Centre Gymnasium, Hangzhou
22 September 2025
19:30

China	2–7	Vietnam
Paihei'er 37'; Yimuran 39'	Report	Trần Quang Nguyên 1'; Vũ Ngọc Ánh 3', 3'; Nguyễn Đa Hải 10'; Nguyễn Thịnh Phát 16', 33', 34'

Linping Sports Centre Gymnasium, Hangzhou

24 September 2025
15:30

Vietnam	4–0	Lebanon
Nguyễn Đa Hải 08'13"; Nguyễn Mạnh Dũng 08'55"; Từ Minh Quang 10'39"; Vũ Ngọc Ánh 24'51"	Report

Linping Sports Centre Gymnasium, Hangzhou
24 September 2025
19:30

China	4–0	Hong Kong
	Report

Linping Sports Centre Gymnasium, Hangzhou

=== Group F ===
Pos	Team	Pld	W	D	L	GF	GA	GD	Pts	Qualification
1	Kyrgyzstan (H)	3	3	0	0	14	4	+10	9	Final tournament
2	Uzbekistan	3	2	0	1	16	5	+11	6	Final tournament
3	Timor-Leste	3	1	0	2	7	20	−13	3	
4	Palestine	3	0	0	3	6	14	−8	0	

Source: AFC
Rules for classification: Qualification tiebreakers
(H) Hosts
20 September 2025
16:00

Uzbekistan	7–1	Palestine
	Report

KFU National Football Academy Sports Compound, Bishkek
20 September 2025
20:00

Kyrgyzstan	9–1	Timor-Leste
	Report

KFU National Football Academy Sports Compound, Bishkek

22 September 2025
16:00

Timor-Leste	1–7	Uzbekistan
	Report

KFU National Football Academy Sports Compound, Bishkek
22 September 2025
20:00

Palestine	1–2	Kyrgyzstan
	Report

KFU National Football Academy Sports Compound, Bishkek

24 September 2025
16:00

Timor-Leste	5–4	Palestine
	Report

KFU National Football Academy Sports Compound, Bishkek
24 September 2025
20:00

Uzbekistan	2–3	Kyrgyzstan
	Report

KFU National Football Academy Sports Compound, Bishkek

=== Group G ===
Pos	Team	Pld	W	D	L	GF	GA	GD	Pts	Qualification
1	Iran	3	3	0	0	26	0	+26	9	Final tournament
2	Malaysia (H)	3	2	0	1	8	5	+3	6	Final tournament
3	United Arab Emirates	3	1	0	2	8	13	−5	3	
4	Bangladesh	3	0	0	3	3	27	−24	0	

Source: AFC
Rules for classification: Qualification tiebreakers
(H) Hosts
20 September 2025
16:00

Iran	12–0	Bangladesh
	Report

Stadium Tertutup Sukpa, Kuantan
20 September 2025
20:30

Malaysia	1–0	United Arab Emirates
Awalludin 28'	Report

Stadium Tertutup Sukpa, Kuantan

22 September 2025
16:00

United Arab Emirates	0–10	Iran
	Report

Stadium Tertutup Sukpa, Kuantan
22 September 2025
20:30

Bangladesh	1–7	Malaysia
Azim 8'	Report	Awalludin 7'; Danial 16'; Mahadir 18, 28'; Syahir 23'; Saad 35'; Faris 36'

Stadium Tertutup Sukpa, Kuantan

24 September 2025
16:00

United Arab Emirates	8–2	Bangladesh
	Report

Stadium Tertutup Sukpa, Kuantan
24 September 2025
20:30

Iran	4–0	Malaysia
Mehdikhani 4'; Derakhshani 12'; Tayyebi 33'; Khalilvand 36'	Report

Stadium Tertutup Sukpa, Kuantan

=== Group H ===
Pos	Team	Pld	W	D	L	GF	GA	GD	Pts	Qualification
1	Afghanistan	2	2	0	0	18	1	+17	6	Final tournament
2	Myanmar (H)	2	1	0	1	7	11	−4	3	
3	Maldives	2	0	0	2	4	17	−13	0	

Source: AFC
Rules for classification: Qualification tiebreakers
(H) Hosts
20 September 2025
16:00

Maldives	1–10	Afghanistan
Ishan Ibrahim 24'	Report	Akbar Kazemi 3', 9'; Seyed Hossein Mousavi 4'; Mohammad Moradi 11', 39'; Farzad Mahmoodi 18'; Hamid Reza Hossaini 19'; Ali Amiri 20'; Abbas Heydari 25'; Reza Hossein Poor 29'

MFF Futsal Indoor Stadium, Yangon

22 September 2025
16:00

Myanmar	7–3	Maldives
Nyein Min Soe 2', 17'; Min Khant Thu 5'; Aung Zin Oo 8', 15', 38', 39'; Myo Myint Soe 21'	Report	Ishan Ibrahim 6'; Ali Shiyah 6'; Huzaifath Rasheed 40'

MFF Futsal Indoor Stadium, Yangon

24 September 2025
16:00

Afghanistan	8–0	Myanmar
Akbar Kazemi 2'; Abbas Heydari 8'; Htun Aung Kyaw 10' (o.g.); Reza Hossein Poor 13'; Hamid Reza Hossaini 18'; Mohammad Moradi 20'; Seyed Hossein Mousavi 30'; Ali Amiri 35'	Report

MFF Futsal Indoor Stadium, Yangon

=== Ranking of runners-up ===
The seven best second-placed teams from the eight groups advanced to the final tournament along with the eight group winners. Due to fewer matches in groups H, results against the fourth-placed teams of each group A to G were not counted in determining the ranking of the second-placed teams.

Pos	Grp	Team	Pld	W	D	L	GF	GA	GD	Pts	Qualification
1	A	Kuwait	2	1	1	0	6	3	+3	4	Final tournament
2	B	South Korea	2	1	1	0	4	2	+2	4	Final tournament
3	F	Uzbekistan	2	1	0	1	9	4	+5	3	Final tournament
4	C	Tajikistan	2	1	0	1	8	4	+4	3	Final tournament
5	D	Saudi Arabia	2	1	0	1	6	2	+4	3	Final tournament
6	E	Lebanon	2	1	0	1	2	5	−3	3	Final tournament
7	G	Malaysia	2	1	0	1	1	4	−3	3	Final tournament
8	H	Myanmar	2	1	0	1	7	11	−4	3	

Source: AFC
Rules for classification: Qualification tiebreakers

== Qualified teams ==
The following teams qualified for the 2026 AFC Futsal Asian Cup.

Team	Method of qualification	Date of qualification	Finals appearances	Last appearance	Previous best performance
Indonesia	Hosts	8 October 2024	11th	2022	Quarter-finals (2022)
Australia	Group A winners	24 September 2025	9th	2024	Fourth place (2012)
Thailand	Group B winners	24 September 2025	18th	2024	Runners-up (2008, 2012, 2024)
Japan	Group C winners	24 September 2025	18th	2024	Champions (2006, 2012, 2014, 2022)
Iraq	Group D winners	22 October 2025	14th	2024	Fourth place (2018)
Vietnam	Group E winners	24 September 2025	8th	2024	Fourth place (2016)
Kyrgyzstan	Group F winners	24 September 2025	17th	2024	Fourth place (2005, 2006, 2007)
Iran	Group G winners	24 September 2025	18th	2024	Champions (1999, 2000, 2001, 2002, 2003, 2004, 2005, 2007, 2008, 2010, 2016, 2018, 2024)
Afghanistan	Group H winners	24 September 2025	2nd	2024	Quarter-finals (2024)
Kuwait	Best runners-up	22 October 2025	14th	2024	Fourth place (2003, 2014)
South Korea	2nd best runners-up	22 October 2025	15th	2024	Runners-up (1999)
Uzbekistan	3rd best runners-up	22 October 2025	18th	2024	Runners-up (2001, 2006, 2010, 2016)
Tajikistan	4th best runners-up	22 October 2025	13th	2024	Fourth place (2024)
Saudi Arabia	5th best runners-up	22 October 2025	4th	2024	Group stage (2016, 2022, 2024)
Lebanon	6th best runners-up	22 October 2025	13th	2022	Quarter-finals (2004, 2007, 2008, 2010, 2012, 2014, 2018)
Malaysia	7th best runners-up	22 October 2025	13th	2018	Group stage (1999, 2001, 2002, 2003, 2004, 2005, 2006, 2007, 2008, 2014, 2016, 2018)
