= Bangladesh national futsal team =

Men's Tutsal Team representing Bangladesh

Bangladesh
- Shirt badge/Association crest
- Nickname(s): Red & Green Tigers
- Association: Bangladesh Football Federation (BFF)
- Confederation: AFC (Asia); SAFF (South Asia)
- Head coach: Said Khodarahmi
- Captain: Rahbar Wahed Khan
- Top scorer: Moin Ahmed; Rahbar Wahed Khan (5 goals each)
- FIFA code: BAN
- FIFA ranking: 139
Home colours	Away colours

First international
- Bangladesh 0–12 Iran (Kuantan, Malaysia; 20 September 2025)

Biggest defeat
- Bangladesh 0–12 Iran (Kuantan, Malaysia; 20 September 2024)

The Bangladesh National Futsal Team (Bengali: বাংলাদেশ জাতীয় ফুটসাল দল) represents Bangladesh in international futsal competitions. The team is controlled by the Bangladesh Football Federation (BFF) as member of the Asian Football Confederation (AFC).

== History ==
A landmark achievement occurred in 2025 when Bangladesh participated in the 2026 AFC Futsal Asian Cup qualifiers for the first time. This debut signified the country's entry into the international futsal arena, reflecting the progress made in developing the sport domestically. Their opponents included Iran, Malaysia and United Arab Emirates. But Bangladesh lost all the matches of this qualifier.Bangladesh played 2026 SAFF Futsal Championship in Thailand and placed 5th among the seven team.

== Players ==
=== Current squad ===
The following players were named for 2026 SAFF Championship.

No.	Pos.	Player	Date of birth (age)	Club
1	FP	Rahbar Wahed Khan (C)		
2	FP	Intishar Mostafa Chowdhury (VC)		
3	FP	MD Tuhin		
4	FP	Kazi Ibrahim Ahamed		
5	FP	Foayej Ahammed		
6	FP	Moin Ahmed		
7	FP	Foysal Hossain		
8	FP	Fayed Azim		
9	FP	Tajware Bin Kashem		
10	FP	Iman Mohammed Alam		
11	FP	Mahamudul Hasan Kiron		
12	FP	Abir Hossain		
13	GK	Jahid Hasan Rabbi		
14	GK	Tannuv Mehatab		

== Top scorers ==
As of 24 January 2026

Rank	Names	Goals
1	Moin Ahmed	5
2	Rahbar Wahed Khan	5
3	Intishar Chowdhury	2
4	Kazi Ibrahim Ahamed	2
5	Fayed Azim	2
6	Abir Hossain	1
7	Md Foysal Hossain	1
8	Tajware Bin Kashem	1

== Results and fixtures ==
The following is a list of match results in the last 12 months, as well as any future matches that have been scheduled.

Legend

Win Draw Lose Fixture

=== 2026 ===
14 January 2026 2026 SAFF Futsal Championship	Bangladesh	4–4	India	Bangkok, Thailand
15:30 BST (UTC+6)	Md Moin Ahmed 9', 31'; Md Rahbar Wahed Khan 16', 37'	Report	Anmol Adhikari 12'; Lalsawmpuia 20'; K Roluahpuia 27', 36'	Stadium: Nonthaburi Stadium; Attendance: 70; Referee: Chris Sinclair (England)

16 January 2026 2026 SAFF Futsal Championship	Bangladesh	1–6	Maldives	Bangkok, Thailand
18:00 BST (UTC+6)	Kazi Ibrahim Ahamed 20'	Report	Mohamed Imran 1'; Ishan Ibrahim 9'; Ahmed Rahil Rasheed 10', 31'; Ali Shiyah 16' (pen.); Abdulla Shafiu 40'	Stadium: Nonthaburi Stadium; Attendance: 100; Referee: Ali Ahmadi (Iran)

18 January 2026 2026 SAFF Futsal Championship	Bangladesh	4–1	Bhutan	Bangkok, Thailand
18:00 BST (UTC+6)	Md Moin Ahmed 5', 10'; Md Foysal Hossain 35'; Kazi Ibrahim Ahamed 36'	Report	Kinga Wingchuk 29'	Stadium: Nonthaburi Stadium; Attendance: 85; Referee: Chris Sinclair (England)

20 January 2026 2026 SAFF Futsal Championship	Bangladesh	5–1	Sri Lanka	Bangkok, Thailand
18:00 BST (UTC+6)	Md Rahbar Wahed Khan 4', 18'; Md Moin Ahmed 22'; Tajware Bin Kashem 34'; Mohammad Abir Hossain 38'	Report	Mohamed Aman Mohamed Faizer 5'	Stadium: Nonthaburi Stadium; Attendance: 51; Referee: Nattakit Hintua

22 January 2026 2026 SAFF Futsal Championship	Bangladesh	1–5	Pakistan	Bangkok, Thailand
15:30 BST (UTC+6)	Fayed Azim 36'	Report	Ali Agha 18', 40'; Zaid Ullah Khan 31', 40'; Salar Ahmed Khan 37'	Stadium: Nonthaburi Stadium; Attendance: 23; Referee: Chris Sinclair

24 January 2026 2026 SAFF Futsal Championship	Bangladesh	1–4	Nepal	Bangkok, Thailand
13:00 BST (UTC+6)	Rahbar Khan 34'	Report	Sanje Syangtan 6'; Lakpa Tamang 14'; Saroj Tamang 29'; Bikrant Narsingh Rana 37'	Stadium: Nonthaburi Stadium; Attendance: 36

== Tournament history ==
=== FIFA Futsal World Cup ===
FIFA Futsal World Cup records
Year	Round	Position	GP	W	D	L	GF	GA
(Netherlands) 1989	Did not participate							
(Hong Kong) 1992	Did not participate							
(Spain) 1996	Did not participate							
(Guatemala) 2000	Did not participate							
(Taiwan) 2004	Did not participate							
(Brazil) 2008	Did not participate							
(Thailand) 2012	Did not participate							
(Colombia) 2016	Did not participate							
(Lithuania) 2021	Did not participate							
(Uzbekistan) 2024	Did not participate							
Total	0/10	0	0	0	0	0	0	0

=== AFC Futsal Asian Cup ===
AFC Futsal Asian Cup records
Year	Round	Position	GP	W	D	L	GF	GA
(Malaysia) 1999	Did not participate							
(Thailand) 2000	Did not participate							
(Iran) 2001	Did not participate							
(Indonesia) 2002	Did not participate							
(Iran) 2003	Did not participate							
(Macau) 2004	Did not participate							
(Vietnam) 2005	Did not participate							
(Uzbekistan) 2006	Did not participate							
(Japan) 2007	Did not participate							
(Thailand) 2008	Did not participate							
(Uzbekistan) 2010	Did not participate							
(United Arab Emirates) 2012	Did not participate							
(Vietnam) 2014	Did not participate							
(Uzbekistan) 2016	Did not participate							
(Taiwan) 2018	Did not participate							
(Turkmenistan) 2020	Did not participate							
(Kuwait) 2022	Did not participate							
(Thailand) 2024	Did not participate							
(Indonesia) 2026	Did not qualify							
Total	0/18	0	0	0	0	0	0	0

=== AFC Futsal Asian Cup qualification ===
AFC Futsal Asian Cup qualification records
Year	Round	Position	GP	W	D	L	GF	GA
2014	Did not participate							
2016	Did not participate							
2018	Did not participate							
2020	Did not participate							
2022	Did not participate							
2024	Did not participate							
(Malaysia) 2026	Group stage	4th	3	0	0	3	27	3
Total	1/7	0	3	0	0	3	27	3

=== SAFF Futsal Championship ===
SAFF Futsal Championship records
Host/Year	Round	Position	GP	W	D	L	GF	GA
(Thailand) 2026	Group stage	5th	6	2	1	3	16	21
Total	1/1	0 Title	6	2	1	3	16	21

== Head-to-head records ==
The following table shows Bangladesh's head-to-head records against all opponents.

As of 24 January 2026

Positive record
Neutral record
Negative record

Opponent	GP	W	D	L	GF	GA	GD	Win %
Bhutan	1	1	0	0	4	1	+3	100.00
India	1	0	1	0	4	4	+0	0.00
Iran	1	0	0	1	0	12	−12	0.00
Malaysia	1	0	0	1	1	7	−6	0.00
Maldives	1	0	0	1	1	6	−5	0.00
Nepal	1	0	0	1	1	4	−3	0.00
Pakistan	1	0	0	1	1	5	−4	0.00
Sri Lanka	1	1	0	0	5	1	+4	100.00
Arab Emirates	1	0	0	1	2	8	−6	0.00
Total	9	2	1	6	19	28	−9	22.22

== Coaching history ==
As of 24 January 2026

Head coach	From	To	P	W	D	L	GS	GA	%W
(Iran) Said Khodarahmi	1 October 2025	Present	9	2	1	6	18	44	22.22

== Current coaching staff ==
Position	Name
Team manager	(Bangladesh) Md Imranur Rahman
Head coach	(Iran) Said Khodarahmi
Assistant coach	(Iran) Mehrdad Mohammadi Aminabadi
Goalkeeping coach	(Myanmar) Kyaw Htet Aung
Physio	(Bangladesh) KM Shakib
Team staff	(Bangladesh) Md Azmul Hossain Bidduth

== See also ==
- Football in Bangladesh
- Sport in Bangladesh
