= Maldives national futsal team =

Represents Maldives in international futsal

- Nickname(s): Red Snappers
- Association: Football Association of Maldives
- Confederation: AFC (Asia)
- FIFA code: MDV
- FIFA ranking: 99 (24 September 2026)
Home colours	Away colours

First international
- Kuwait 20–0 Maldives (Macau, Macau; 16 April 2004)

Biggest win
- Pakistan 1–7 Maldives (Bangkok, Thailand; 14 January 2026)

Biggest defeat
- Thailand 25–0 Maldives (Ho Chi Minh City, Vietnam; 26 May 2005)

FIFA World Cup
- Appearances: None

AFC Futsal Championship
- Appearances: 2 (First in 2004)
- Best result: Group stage (2004 and 2005)

SAFF Futsal Championship
- Appearances: 1 (First in 2026)
- Best result: Champions (2026)

The Maldives national futsal team is controlled by the Football Association of Maldives, the governing body for futsal in the Maldives and represents the country in international futsal competitions.

== Results and fixtures ==
The following is a list of match results in the last 12 months, as well as any future matches that have been scheduled.

Legend

Win Draw Lose Fixture

=== 2026 ===
14 January 2026 2026 SAFF Futsal Championship	Pakistan	1–7	Maldives	Bangkok, Thailand
19:00 UTC+6:30		Report	Ahmed Hameed 7'; Ali Shiyah 10'; Mohamed Imran 12', 24'; Zaidhaan Ahmed 20'; Ali Shamal Abdulla 20'; Abdulla Shafiu 33'	Stadium: Nonthaburi Stadium, Bangkok

16 January 2026 2026 SAFF Futsal Championship	Maldives	6–1	Bangladesh	Bangkok, Thailand
19:00 UTC+6:30	Mohamed Imran 1'; Ishan Ibrahim 9'; Ahmed Rahil Rasheed 10', 31'; Ali Shiyah 16' (pen.); Abdulla Shafiu 40'	Report	Kazi Ibrahim Ahamed 20'	Stadium: Nonthaburi Stadium, Bangkok; Referee: Ali Ahmadi (Iran)

20 January 2026 2026 SAFF Futsal Championship	Maldives	5–0	India	Bangkok, Thailand
16:30 UTC+6:30	Mohamed Imran 12', 30'; Abdulla Shafiu 22'; Ali Shamal Abdulla 24'; Ahmed Hameed 40'	Report		Stadium: Nonthaburi Stadium, Bangkok; Referee: Ali Hafizi (Iran)

22 January 2026 2026 SAFF Futsal Championship	Maldives	2–1	Nepal	Bangkok, Thailand
14:00 UTC+6:30	Abdulla Shafiu 23'; Mohamed Imran 33'	Report	Bikrant Narsingh Rana 24'	Stadium: Nonthaburi Stadium, Bangkok; Referee: Ali Hafizi (Iran)

24 January 2026 2026 SAFF Futsal Championship	Bhutan	1–3	Maldives	Bangkok, Thailand
16:30 UTC+6:30	Jigme Tshultrim 12'	Report	Abdulla Junaid 19'; Ahmed Hameed 23'; Mohamed Imran 36'	Stadium: Nonthaburi Stadium, Bangkok; Referee: Ali Ahmadi (Iran)

26 January 2026 2026 SAFF Futsal Championship	Sri Lanka	2–5	Maldives	Bangkok, Thailand
16:30 UTC+6:30	Mohammed Thilham 17'; Mohamed Aman 26'	Report	Mohamed Imran 12', 36'; Huzaifath Rasheed 20'; Mohamed Aakib 29' (o.g.); Hussain Suhail 34'	Stadium: Nonthaburi Stadium; Attendance: 50; Referee: Nicholas Backo (Australia)

== Team ==
=== Current squad ===
The following 14 players are called for 2026 SAFF Futsal Championship in Thailand between 14 and 26 January 2026.

Head coach: (Uzbekistan) Farrukh Zakirov

No.	Pos.	Player	Date of birth (age)	Caps	Goals	Club
1	GK	Ibrahim Naajihu				
2	GK	Zaidhaan Ahmed				
3	GK	Ali Shiyah				
4		Ahmed Hameed				
5		Ishan Ibrahim				
6		Hussain Shareef				
7		Mohamed Imran				
8		Abdulla Shafiu				
9		Hussain Suhail				
10		Huzaifath Rasheed				
11		Ahmed Rahil Rasheed				
12		Abdulla Junaid				
13		Ali Haisam				
14		Ali Shamal Abdulla				

== Tournaments ==
=== FIFA Futsal World Cup ===
- 1989 – Did not enter
- 1992 – Did not enter
- 1996 – Did not enter
- 2000 – Did not enter
- 2004 – Did not qualify
- 2008 – Did not qualify
- 2012 – Did not enter
- 2016 – Did not enter
- 2021 – Did not qualify
- 2024 – Did not qualify

=== AFC Futsal Championship ===
- 1999 – Did not enter
- 2000 – Did not enter
- 2001 – Did not enter
- 2002 – Did not enter
- 2003 – Did not enter
- 2004 – Group stage
- 2005 – Group stage
- 2006 – Did not qualify
- 2007 – Did not qualify
- 2008 – Did not qualify
- 2010 – Did not enter
- 2012 – Did not enter
- 2014 – Did not enter
- 2016 – Did not enter

=== SAFF Futsal Championship ===
- 2026 – Champions

== Results ==
Number	Opponent	Result
2004 AFC Futsal Championship
1	Kuwait	0-20 L
2	South Korea	3-23 L
3	Chinese Taipei	2-11 L
2005 AFC Futsal Championship
4	China	0-21 L
5	Turkmenistan	0-5 L
6	Thailand	0-25 L
7	Chinese Taipei	1-4 L
8	Hong Kong	1-6 L
9	South Korea	3-13 L
2006 AFC Futsal Championship qualification
10	Turkmenistan	0-8 L
11	Cambodia	2-3 L
12	Malaysia	0-8 L
13	Vietnam	0-5 L
2007 AFC Futsal Championship qualification
14	Chinese Taipei	1-6 L
15	Lebanon	1-14 L
16	Philippines	2-5 L
2008 AFC Futsal Championship qualification
17	Chinese Taipei	2-4 L
18	Malaysia	4-9 L
19	Vietnam	2-4 L
Futsal at the 2017 Asian Indoor and Martial Arts Games
20	United Arab Emirates	1-3 L
21	Afghanistan	1-6 L
22	Uzbekistan	1-9 L
23	China	3-9 L
2022 Thailand Five's Futsal Tournament
24	Thailand	3-8 L
25	Oman	4-7 L
26	Mongolia	3-3 D (5-4 P)
2022 AFC Futsal Asian Cup qualification
27	Iran	0-17 L
28	Kyrgyzstan	1-7 L
29	Turkmenistan	0-7 L
2024 AFC Futsal Asian Cup qualification
30	Iran	2-18 L
31	Lebanon	1-6 L
32	Kyrgyzstan	3-8 L
2026 AFC Futsal Asian Cup qualification
33	Afghanistan	1-10 L
34	Myanmar	3-7 L
2026 SAFF Futsal Championship
35	Pakistan	1-7 W
36	Bangladesh	6-1 W
37	India	5-0 W
38	Nepal	2-1 W
39	Bhutan	3-1 W
40	Sri Lanka	5-2 W

Total : 40 M, 6 W, 1 D, 33 L, 72 GF, 308 GA, -236 GD

== Player records ==
As of 26 January 2026.

Players in bold were included in the most recent Maldives squad.

=== Top goalscorers ===
The table contains goals attributed to named Maldives players in the available match records. Some matches between 2004 and 2022 have incomplete goalscorer information; therefore, this is not necessarily a complete all-time ranking.

Rank	Player	Goals	Period
1	**Mohamed Imran**	10	2017–2026
2	**Abdulla Shafiu**	6	2022–2026
3	Ali Haafiz	5	2022–2023
3	**Ishan Ibrahim**	5	2022–2026
5	Ahmed Visal	4	2007–2008
5	**Ali Shiyah**	4	2023–2026
7	**Ahmed Hameed**	3	2026
7	**Huzaifath Rasheed**	3	2022–2026
9	Mohamed Haishan Najeeb	2	2008
9	Yamin Mohamed	2	2008
9	Ibrahim Furuqan	2	2017
9	Mohamed Nasid Ahmed Naseem	2	2017
9	**Ali Shamal Abdulla**	2	2026
9	**Ahmed Rahil Rasheed**	2	2026
15	Jaufar Mohamed Niyaz	1	2004
15	Ahmed Mohamed	1	2004
15	Abdul Rahman Naif	1	2004
15	Hussain Adeel	1	2007
15	Abdulla Naseer	1	2007
15	Mohamed Mahzoom	1	2007
15	Ismail Mohamed	1	2008
15	Ali Riswan Ahmed	1	2017
15	**Hussain Shareef**	1	2022
15	Mohamed Yafaau	1	2022
15	**Zaidhaan Ahmed**	1	2026
15	**Abdulla Junaid**	1	2026
15	**Hussain Suhail**	1	2026
