= Aman Faizer =

Sri Lankan footballer (born 1999)

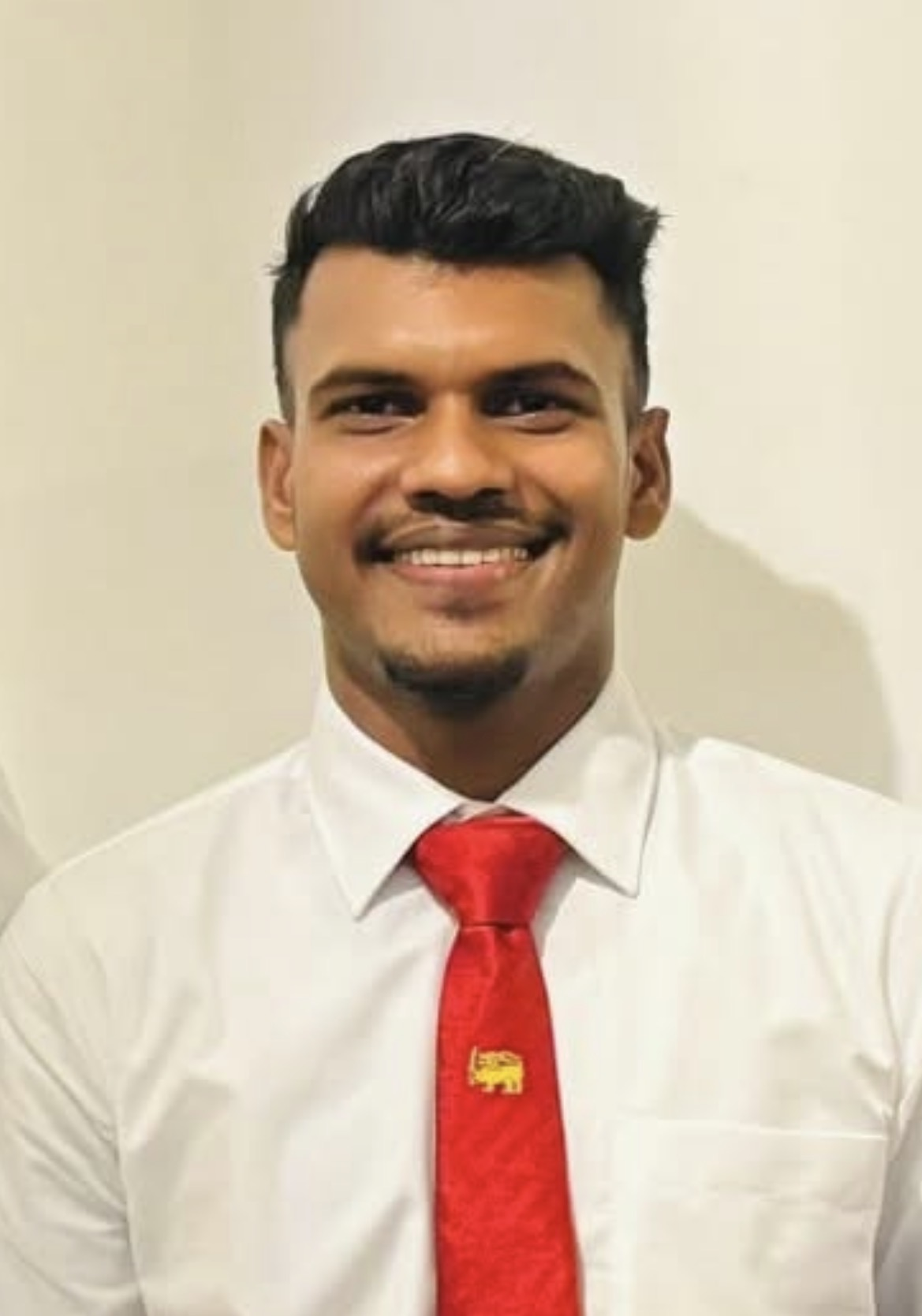

Personal information
- Full name: Mohamed Aman Faizer
- Date of birth: 12 March 1999 (age 27)
- Place of birth: Sri Lanka
- Height: 1.77 m (5 ft 10 in)
- Position: Midfielder

Team information
- Current team: Renown

Senior career*
Years	Team	Apps	(Gls)
2018–	Renown		

International career^{‡}
2019–	Sri Lanka	21	(0)
2026–	Sri Lanka futsal	6	(2)
- * Club domestic league appearances and goals as of 11:01, 8 October 2021 (UTC) ‡ National team caps and goals as of 1 February 2026

Mohamed Aman Faizer (born 12 March 1999; better known as Aman Faizer) is a Sri Lankan professional footballer who plays as a midfielder for Sri Lanka Champions League club Renown and the Sri Lanka national team and he is a proud production of Hameed Al Husseinie College Colombo.

== Career ==
Aman scored his first goal for Sri Lanka futsal team in the 2026 SAFF Futsal Championship.
