= 2024 AFC Futsal Asian Cup qualification =

International futsal competition

Tournament details
- Host countries: Thailand (Group A); Saudi Arabia (Group B); Kyrgyzstan (Group C); Mongolia (Group D); Tajikistan (Group E); Bahrain (Group F); Uzbekistan (Group G); Chinese Taipei (Group H)
- Dates: 7–13 October 2023
- Teams: 30 (from 1 confederation)

Tournament statistics
- Matches played: 43
- Goals scored: 303 (7.05 per match)
- Top scorer(s): (Iran) Saeid Ahmadabbasi (8 goals)

The 2024 AFC Futsal Asian Cup qualification was the qualification process organized by the Asian Football Confederation (AFC) to determine the participating teams for the 2024 AFC Futsal Asian Cup, the 17th edition of the international men's futsal championship of Asia.

A total of 16 teams qualified to play in the final tournament in Thailand. The host country Thailand qualified automatically, while the other 15 teams were decided by qualification, with the matches played between 7–13 October 2023 in centralised venues.

This tournament also served as the first stage of Asian qualification for the 2024 FIFA Futsal World Cup, where five teams from the Futsal Asian Cup qualify directly for the World Cup (plus hosts Uzbekistan).

== Format changes ==
The AFC Executive Committee had approved several strategic recommendations put forward by the AFC Competitions Committee, one of which was the removal of zoning principles in the AFC's Futsal and Beach Soccer competitions.

== Teams ==
The 46 AFC member associations were eligible to enter the qualification after Sri Lanka was barred from participating in international competitions due to FIFA suspension before the draw. The Northern Mariana Islands, whose association are not FIFA members, were not be eligible to qualify for the 2024 FIFA Futsal World Cup.

Only 30 teams including China, India and Macau who did not participate in the previous edition, entered the competition. Thailand automatically qualified for the final tournament as hosts, but decided to also participate in the qualifying competition. 17 teams including Turkmenistan who withdrew after the draw plus Oman and United Arab Emirates who did participate in the previous edition, did not enter to the qualification and were listed below. The following teams with asterisks are the teams never entered the qualification.

- Bangladesh*
- Bhutan
- Guam
- Jordan
- Laos
- Northern Mariana Islands*
- Oman
- Pakistan*
- North Korea*
- Philippines
- Qatar
- Singapore
- Sri Lanka* (suspended before the draw)
- Syria
- Turkmenistan (withdrew after the draw)
- United Arab Emirates
- Yemen*

=== Draw ===
The draw was held on 22 June 2023 at the AFC House in Kuala Lumpur, Malaysia.

31 teams including Turkmenistan who withdrew after the draw and Thailand who automatically qualified as hosts after the draw, were seeded into four pots based on their performance at the qualification and the final tournament of the previous edition. The eight hosts of the qualification including Indonesia who withdrew the hosts after the draw, were placed into the host pots.

==== Seeding ====
Teams who participated in the final tournament of the previous edition were ranked from the 1st to the 15th by their performance at that tournament and other teams who participated in the qualification of the previous edition were ranked from the 16th to 27th by their performance at that tournament. China, India and Macau who did not participate in the previous edition, were unranked.

Final rankings

Pos	Team	Pld	W	D	L	GF	GA	GD	Pts	Final results
1	**Japan**	6	5	0	1	17	7	+10	15	Champions
2	**Iran**	6	5	0	1	39	5	+34	15	Runners-up
3	**Uzbekistan**	6	5	0	1	29	7	+22	15	Third place
4	**Thailand**	6	3	1	2	16	20	−4	10	Fourth place
5	**Tajikistan**	4	2	0	2	16	14	+2	6	Eliminated in quarter-finals (Note: Teams are ranked in descending order as follows: goal difference in the quarter-finals, goals scored in the quarter-finals and the procedure used same as the teams eliminated in the group stage.)
6	**Indonesia**	4	2	0	2	13	11	+2	6	Eliminated in quarter-finals
7	**Kuwait**	4	1	2	1	11	9	+2	5	Eliminated in quarter-finals
8	**Vietnam**	4	2	0	2	9	12	−3	6	Eliminated in quarter-finals
9	**Saudi Arabia**	3	2	0	1	7	4	+3	6	Eliminated in group stage (Note: Teams are ranked in descending order as follows: position in the group stage, points, goal difference, goals scored and disciplinary points in all group matches and drawing of lots.)
10	**Iraq**	3	1	1	1	9	5	+4	4	Eliminated in group stage
11	**Bahrain**	3	0	1	2	8	14	−6	1	Eliminated in group stage
12	**Chinese Taipei**	3	0	1	2	3	15	−12	1	Eliminated in group stage
13	**Turkmenistan**	3	0	1	2	9	20	−11	1	Eliminated in group stage
14	**Lebanon**	3	0	1	2	3	17	−14	1	Eliminated in group stage
15	**South Korea**	3	0	0	3	1	15	−14	0	Eliminated in group stage
16	Oman	3	0	0	3	3	18	−15	0	Eliminated in group stage

Source: AFC

Qualification rankings

Pos	Team	Pld	W	D	L	GF	GA	GD	Pts	Qualification results
1	Japan	4	4	0	0	42	3	+39	12	Qualify for final tournament (Note: Teams are ranked in descending order as follows: position in the group stage, points in same number of group matches among the teams with same group position, goal difference in same number of group matches among the teams with same group position, goals scored in same number of group matches among the teams with same group position, disciplinary points in same number of group matches among the teams with same group position and drawing of lots.)
2	Iran	3	3	0	0	28	1	+27	9	Qualify for final tournament
3	Uzbekistan	3	3	0	0	15	4	+11	9	Qualify for final tournament
4	Thailand	6	4	2	0	40	7	+33	14	Qualify for final tournament
5	Iraq	2	1	1	0	3	1	+2	4	Qualify for final tournament
6	Lebanon	3	2	1	0	11	7	+4	7	Qualify for final tournament
7	Indonesia	6	4	2	0	38	8	+30	14	Qualify for final tournament
8	Vietnam	5	2	2	1	15	7	+8	8	Qualify for final tournament
9	Bahrain	2	1	1	0	2	1	+1	4	Qualify for final tournament
10	Saudi Arabia	3	1	2	0	10	9	+1	5	Qualify for final tournament
11	Turkmenistan	3	2	0	1	10	4	+6	6	Qualify for final tournament
12	Tajikistan	3	1	1	1	17	10	+7	4	Qualify for final tournament
13	South Korea	4	2	1	1	11	12	−1	7	Qualify for final tournament
14	Oman	4	1	2	1	9	8	+1	5	Qualify for final tournament
15	Chinese Taipei	4	2	0	2	13	14	−1	6	Qualify for final tournament
16	**Myanmar**	5	2	2	1	19	12	+7	8	Eliminated in qualification
17	**Afghanistan**	3	1	1	1	13	10	+3	4	Eliminated in qualification
18	United Arab Emirates	3	0	0	3	3	8	−5	0	Eliminated in qualification
19	**Kyrgyzstan**	3	1	0	2	9	12	−3	3	Eliminated in qualification
20	**Malaysia**	4	2	0	2	20	15	+5	6	Eliminated in qualification
21	**Australia**	3	1	0	2	9	15	−6	3	Eliminated in qualification
22	**Palestine**	3	0	1	2	8	12	−4	1	Eliminated in qualification
23	**Hong Kong**	4	0	2	2	6	17	−11	2	Eliminated in qualification
24	**Timor-Leste**	3	0	0	3	8	24	−16	0	Eliminated in qualification
25	**Nepal**	3	0	0	3	3	24	−21	0	Eliminated in qualification
26	**Cambodia**	4	0	1	3	10	36	−26	1	Eliminated in qualification
27	**Maldives**	3	0	0	3	1	31	−30	0	Eliminated in qualification
28	**Mongolia**	4	0	1	3	2	28	−26	1	Eliminated in qualification
29	**Brunei**	4	0	1	3	2	37	−35	1	Eliminated in qualification

Source: AFC

==== Pots ====
The 31 teams including Turkmenistan who withdrew after the draw and Thailand who automatically qualified as hosts after the draw, were drawn into six groups of four teams and two groups of three teams.

	Pot 1	Pot 2	Pot 3	Pot 4
Host teams	3. **Uzbekistan** **(H)**; 4. **Thailand** **(H, Q)**; 5. Indonesia; 6. **Tajikistan** **(H)**	11. **Bahrain** **(H)**; 13. Chinese Taipei **(H)**	18. **Kyrgyzstan** **(H)**	27. Mongolia **(H)**
Remaining teams	1. **Japan**; 2. **Iran**; 7. **Kuwait**; 8. **Vietnam**	9. **Saudi Arabia** **(H)**; 10. **Iraq**; 12. Turkmenistan **(W)**; 14. Lebanon; 15. **South Korea**; 16. **Myanmar**	17. **Afghanistan**; 19. Malaysia; 20. **Australia**; 21. Palestine; 22. Hong Kong; 23. Timor-Leste; 24. Nepal	25. Cambodia; 26. Maldives; 28. Brunei; 29. **China**; 29. India; 29. Macau

Notes

- Teams in **bold** qualified for the final tournament.
- (H): Qualification group hosts.
- (Q): Final tournament hosts, automatically qualified regardless of qualification results.
- (W): Withdrew after the draw.

== Groups ==
=== Tiebreakers ===
Teams are ranked according to points (3 points for a win, 1 point for a draw, 0 points for a loss), and if tied on points, the following tiebreaking criteria are applied, in the order given, to determine the rankings:

1. Points in head-to-head matches among tied teams;
2. Goal difference in head-to-head matches among tied teams;
3. Goals scored in head-to-head matches among tied teams;
4. If more than two teams were tied, and after applying all head-to-head criteria above, a subset of teams are still tied, all head-to-head criteria above are reapplied exclusively to this subset of teams;
5. Goal difference in all group matches;
6. Goals scored in all group matches;
7. Penalty shoot-out if only two teams are tied and they are playing each other in the last round of the group;
8. Disciplinary points (yellow card = −1 point, red card as a result of two yellow cards = −3 points, direct red card = −3 points, yellow card followed by direct red card = −4 points);
9. Drawing of lots.

=== Group A ===
Thailand already qualified to the final tournament as host country, so their matches were not taken into account when calculating the group ranking. Since Turkmenistan withdrew after the draw, China and Hong Kong played each other twice, and only the group winner advanced to the final tournament.

Pos	Team	Pld	W	D	L	GF	GA	GD	Pts	Qualification
1	China	2	2	0	0	11	2	+9	6	Final tournament
2	Hong Kong	2	0	0	2	2	11	−9	0	

Source: AFC
Rules for classification: Qualification tiebreakers
7 October 2023
18:00

China	1–5	Thailand
Wang Bo 39'	Report	Charoenphong 8'; Praphaphan 9'; Phalaphruek 11'; Srirangpirot 17'; Kittipanuwong 29'

Bangkok Arena, Bangkok

9 October 2023
17:00

Hong Kong	0–6	China
	Report	Lee Wo Ho 9' (o.g.); Wang Bo 23'; Paiheierding Tudahong 25' (pen.); Chow Ka Wa 28' (o.g.); Ding Shunjie 32'; Yakepujiang Maimaiti 37'

Bangkok Arena, Bangkok

11 October 2023
19:30

Thailand	6–0	Hong Kong
Srirangpirot 7', 22'; Praphaphan 9', 19'; Osamamusa 36', 40'	Report

Bangkok Arena, Bangkok

13 October 2023
17:00

China	5–2	Hong Kong
Yang Zu 4', 4', 26'; Pan Zhongdi 26'; Paiheierding Tudahong 31'	Report	Liu Kin Po 27'; Chan Lok Him 36'

Bangkok Arena, Bangkok

=== Group B ===
Pos	Team	Pld	W	D	L	GF	GA	GD	Pts	Qualification
1	Afghanistan	3	2	1	0	28	11	+17	7	Final tournament
2	Saudi Arabia (H)	3	2	0	1	14	5	+9	6	Final tournament
3	Indonesia	3	1	1	1	21	10	+11	4	
4	Macau	3	0	0	3	2	39	−37	0	

Source: AFC
Rules for classification: Qualification tiebreakers
(H) Hosts
7 October 2023
16:00

Indonesia	12–0	Macau
Antonio 3' (o.g.); Ardiansyah 4', 37'; Syauqi 16', 18', 39'; Alfajri 17'; Samuel 23'; So Ka Chon 28' (o.g.); Evan 34', 39', 39'	Report

Green Hall, Dammam
8 October 2023
19:00

Saudi Arabia	2–3	Afghanistan
F. Alasmari 2'; A. Alaqeeli 27'	Report	Kazemi 2', 7'; Mousavi 15'

Green Hall, Dammam

9 October 2023
19:00

Macau	0–9	Saudi Arabia
	Report	A. Alaqeeli 2', 40'; F. Almaleh 4', 12', 17', 20'; Alqarni 6'; F. Aljohani 13'; A. Alotaibi 38'

Green Hall, Dammam
9 October 2023
16:00

Afghanistan	7–7	Indonesia
Amiri 2' (pen.), 12'; Hossein Poor 3', 24'; Norowzi 9'; Gholami 12'; Gorgej 38'	Report	Samuel 7', 28', 36'; Rio 20'; Hossaini 36' (o.g.); Ardiansyah 39'; Ardiansyah Nur 40'

Green Hall, Dammam

11 October 2023
19:00

Indonesia	2–3	Saudi Arabia
Ardiansyah 14', 17'	Report	F. Almaleh 15'; Alasiri 16'; Aroan 18'

Green Hall, Dammam
11 October 2023
16:00

Afghanistan	18–2	Macau
Mousavi 4', 4', 10', 19', 22'; Norowzi 8'; Sadeqi 11'; Zadah 17'; Mahmoodi 20', 27'; Kazemi 23', 26', 27', 35'; Gholami 29', 39'; Poor 34'; Jafari 34'	Report	Fong 14' (pen.), 35'

Green Hall, Dammam

=== Group C ===
Pos	Team	Pld	W	D	L	GF	GA	GD	Pts	Qualification
1	Iran	3	3	0	0	34	4	+30	9	Final tournament
2	Kyrgyzstan (H)	3	2	0	1	15	17	−2	6	Final tournament
3	Lebanon	3	1	0	2	10	12	−2	3	
4	Maldives	3	0	0	3	6	32	−26	0	

Source: AFC
Rules for classification: Qualification tiebreakers
(H) Hosts
7 October 2023
16:00

Iran	18–2	Maldives
Aghapour 2'; Daoudi 5', 15'; Ahmadabbasi 6', 23', 27', 33', 35', 35'; Karimi 12'; Tayyebi 14', 21', 23', 39'; Derakhshani 27'; Azimihematabadi 28', 30'; Saamin Naseer 30' (o.g.)	Report	Ali Haafiz 18'; Ali Shiyah 32'

Bishkek Arena, Bishkek
7 October 2023
19:00

Lebanon	4–5	Kyrgyzstan
Alame 9'; El Khoury 11'; Kheir El Dine 24', 33'	Report	Alimov 5', 33'; Kubanychov 19', 35'; Abdyzhalil Uulu 39'

Bishkek Arena, Bishkek

9 October 2023
16:00

Maldives	1–6	Lebanon
Ali Haafiz 12'	Report	Rhyem 16', 20'; Abou Zeid 24'; Abou Jaoude 31'; El Khoury 35'; Ali Haafiz 36' (o.g.)

Bishkek Arena, Bishkek
9 October 2023
19:00

Kyrgyzstan	2–10	Iran
Daniiar Uulu 25'; Abdyzhalil Uulu 40'	Report	Tayyebi 2', 20' (pen.); Derakhshani 17', 34', 38'; Karimi 17', 30'; Daoudi 19'; Rostami Ha 24'; Ahmadabbasi 25'

Bishkek Arena, Bishkek

11 October 2023
16:00

Iran	6–0	Lebanon
Azimihematabadi 11', 37'; Parsapour 12'; Tayyebi 14'; Ahmadabbasi 16'; Oladghobad 18'	Report

Bishkek Arena, Bishkek
11 October 2023
19:00

Kyrgyzstan	8–3	Maldives
Abdyzhalil Uulu 4', 39'; Shokhrukh 19', 20', 27', 27', 32'; Daniiar 28'	Report	Shafiu 18'; Ali Haafiz 28' (pen.), 31'

Bishkek Arena, Bishkek

=== Group D ===
Pos	Team	Pld	W	D	L	GF	GA	GD	Pts	Qualification
1	Vietnam	3	3	0	0	16	3	+13	9	Final tournament
2	South Korea	3	2	0	1	13	7	+6	6	Final tournament
3	Nepal	3	0	1	2	2	11	−9	1	
4	Mongolia (H)	3	0	1	2	3	13	−10	1	

Updated to match(es) played on 11 October 2023. Source: AFC
Rules for classification: Qualification tiebreakers
(H) Hosts
7 October 2023
14:00

Vietnam	6–1	Mongolia
Nguyễn Thịnh Phát 9', 22'; Nguyễn Minh Trí 12'; Nhan Gia Hưng 21'; Ngô Ngọc Sơn 27'; Phạm Đức Hòa 31'	Report	Altantulga 22'

Buyant Ukhaa Sport Palace, Ulaanbaatar
7 October 2023
17:00

South Korea	5–1	Nepal
Lee Han-wool 4'; Shin Jong-hoon 10', 19', 31', 34' (pen.)	Report	Shrestha 21'

Buyant Ukhaa Sport Palace, Ulaanbaatar

9 October 2023
14:00

Mongolia	1–6	South Korea
Tumurbaatar 7'	Report	Shin Jong-hoon 3', 18'; Lee Min-hyeok 16'; Han Sang-seok 26'; Moon Hee-jae 27'; Kim Yun-young 30'

Buyant Ukhaa Sport Palace, Ulaanbaatar
9 October 2023
17:00

Nepal	0–5	Vietnam
	Report	Châu Đoàn Phát 2', 40'; Dương Ngọc Linh 9'; Nguyễn Minh Trí 19'; Từ Minh Quang 22'

Buyant Ukhaa Sport Palace, Ulaanbaatar

11 October 2023
14:00

Vietnam	5–2	South Korea
Dương Ngọc Linh 15', 29'; Nhan Gia Hưng 16'; Đinh Công Viên 29'; Nguyễn Minh Trí 35'	Report	Eom Jiyong 23'; Shin Jonghoon 40'

Buyant Ukhaa Sport Palace, Ulaanbaatar
11 October 2023
17:00

Nepal	1–1	Mongolia
Sumit Shrestha 11'	Report	Uuganbayar 19'

Buyant Ukhaa Sport Palace, Ulaanbaatar

=== Group E ===
Pos	Team	Pld	W	D	L	GF	GA	GD	Pts	Qualification
1	Tajikistan (H)	3	3	0	0	15	4	+11	9	Final tournament
2	Myanmar	3	2	0	1	7	6	+1	6	Final tournament
3	Palestine	3	1	0	2	8	13	−5	3	
4	India	3	0	0	3	10	17	−7	0	

Source: AFC
Rules for classification: Qualification tiebreakers
(H) Hosts
7 October 2023
16:00

Myanmar	2–1	Palestine
Nyein Min Soe 21', 40'	Report	Harara 17'

Dushanbe Indoor Hall, Dushanbe
7 October 2023
19:00

Tajikistan	6–3	India
Kuziev 2'; Yorov 14', 34'; Sardorov 19', 28'; Sharipov 30'	Report	Laltlansanga 6', 14', 17'

Dushanbe Indoor Hall, Dushanbe

9 October 2023
16:00

India	2–5	Myanmar
Roluahpuia 11'; Laltlansanga 39'	Report	Thyne Phwet Aung 3'; Myo Thet Aung 13', 40'; Laltlansanga 19' (o.g.); Hlaing Min Tun 40'

Dushanbe Indoor Hall, Dushanbe
9 October 2023
19:00

Palestine	1–6	Tajikistan
Harara 32'	Report	Fahjan 11' (o.g.); Rizomov 15'; Khojaev 25'; Fayzali 28'; Sharipov 37'; A. Mohammed 39' (o.g.)

Dushanbe Indoor Hall, Dushanbe

11 October 2023
19:00

Tajikistan	3–0	Myanmar
Yorov 31'; Sardorov 31'; Komron 33'	Report

Dushanbe Indoor Hall, Dushanbe
11 October 2023
16:00

Palestine	6–5	India
Harara 3'; Alsamahi 6'; Mohammed 20', 34'; Massriea 23'	Report	Laltlansanga 6', 16'; Mali 14', 16'; Roluahpuia 28'

Dushanbe Indoor Hall, Dushanbe

=== Group F ===
Pos	Team	Pld	W	D	L	GF	GA	GD	Pts	Qualification
1	Kuwait	3	3	0	0	17	6	+11	9	Final tournament
2	Bahrain (H)	3	2	0	1	10	6	+4	6	Final tournament
3	Timor-Leste	3	1	0	2	9	9	0	3	
4	Brunei	3	0	0	3	3	18	−15	0	

Source: AFC
Rules for classification: Qualification tiebreakers
(H) Hosts
7 October 2023
16:00

Kuwait	4–2	Brunei
Almansour 20'; Alfadhel 21'; Altawail 22' (pen.), 28' (pen.)	Report	Yunus 17'; Farhan 25'

Khalifa Sports City Hall, Isa Town
7 October 2023
18:30

Bahrain	1–0	Timor-Leste
Mahfoodh 39'	Report

Khalifa Sports City Hall, Isa Town

9 October 2023
16:00

Timor-Leste	1–8	Kuwait
Fernandes 19'	Report	Altawail 4'; Borashed 8'; Alalban 9'; Alfadel 13', 16', 34'; Alajmi 35'; Alabasi 37'

Khalifa Sports City Hall, Isa Town
9 October 2023
18:30

Brunei	1–6	Bahrain
Alsandi 14' (o.g.)	Report	A. Hamad 5'; F. Yusuf 6'; J. Anan 30'; S. Sanjar 33', 40'; S. Muhammad 39'

Khalifa Sports City Hall, Isa Town

11 October 2023
18:30

Kuwait	5–3	Bahrain
Altawail 4', 15', 20', 23'; Alajmi 35'	Report	F. Yusuf 6'; J. Anan 30', 34'

Khalifa Sports City Hall, Isa Town
11 October 2023
16:00

Timor-Leste	8–0	Brunei
Soares 1'; de Sousa 3', 39'; Costa 4'; Fernandes 18', 40'; Guterres 19'; Soares 39'	Report

Khalifa Sports City Hall, Isa Town

=== Group G ===
Pos	Team	Pld	W	D	L	GF	GA	GD	Pts	Qualification
1	Uzbekistan (H)	3	3	0	0	13	5	+8	9	Final tournament
2	Iraq	3	2	0	1	10	4	+6	6	Final tournament
3	Malaysia	3	1	0	2	9	8	+1	3	
4	Cambodia	3	0	0	3	3	18	−15	0	

Source: AFC
Rules for classification: Qualification tiebreakers
(H) Hosts
7 October 2023
15:00

Iraq	2–1	Malaysia
Arab 10'; Alhusaynat 14'	Report	Awalluddin 40'

Samo Sports Complex, Fergana
7 October 2023
18:00

Uzbekistan	6–1	Cambodia
Tulkinov 19'; Rakhmatov 25'; Nishonov 30', 36'; Rakhmatullaev 35'; Elibaev 38'	Report	Reechhee 18'

Samo Sports Complex, Fergana

9 October 2023
15:00

Cambodia	0–7	Iraq
	Report	Al-Mayali 5', 22', 31'; Al-Iedan 5'; Al-Husaynat 8', 34'; Bazooni 39'

Samo Sports Complex, Fergana
9 October 2023
18:00

Malaysia	3–4	Uzbekistan
Syahir 33', 39', 40'	Report	Ropiev 18'; Choriev 27'; Tulkinov 28'; Rakhmatov 38'

Samo Sports Complex, Fergana

11 October 2023
18:00

Uzbekistan	3–1	Iraq
Rakhmatov 5', 11'; Choriev 27'		Arab 10'

Samo Sports Complex, Fergana
11 October 2023
15:00

Malaysia	5–2	Cambodia
Syahir 1', 10', 35'; Shahril; 23', 27'		Ken Pouchit 22'; Ouk Lak Sam 33'

Samo Sports Complex, Fergana

=== Group H ===
Pos	Team	Pld	W	D	L	GF	GA	GD	Pts	Qualification
1	Japan	2	2	0	0	7	0	+7	6	Final tournament
2	Australia	2	1	0	1	3	6	−3	3	Final tournament
3	Chinese Taipei (H)	2	0	0	2	2	6	−4	0	

Source: AFC
Rules for classification: Qualification tiebreakers
(H) Hosts
7 October 2023
19:00

Australia	0–4	Japan
	Report	Yoshikawa 9'; Oliveira 13' (pen.), 33', 35'

University of Taipei Gymnasium, Taipei

9 October 2023
19:00

Chinese Taipei	2–3	Australia
Huang Wei-lun 33'; Huang Po-chun 36'	Report	Fornito 18'; Adeli 38', 40'

University of Taipei Gymnasium, Taipei

11 October 2023
19:00

Japan	3–0	Chinese Taipei
Hirata 7'; Uchida 17', 33'	Report

University of Taipei Gymnasium, Taipei

== Goalscorers ==
There have been 303 goals scored in 43 matches, for an average of 7.05 goals per match.

8 goals

- (Iran) Saeid Ahmadabbasi

7 goals

- (Iran) Hossein Tayyebi
- (Kuwait) Abdulrahman Altawail
- (South Korea) Shin Jong-hoon

6 goals

- (Afghanistan) Seyed Hossein Mousavi
- (Afghanistan) Akbar Kazemi
- (India) David Laltlansanga
- (Malaysia) Syahir Iqbal Khan

5 goals

- (Indonesia) Ardiansyah Runtuboy
- (Kyrgyzstan) Makhmadaminov Shokhrukh
- (Saudi Arabia) Fares Fahad Almaleh

4 goals

- (Indonesia) Samuel Eko
- (Iran) Behroz Azimihematabadi
- (Iran) Mohammad Hossein Derakhshani
- (Kuwait) Saleh Alfadhel
- (Kyrgyzstan) Aidarbek Abdyzhalil Uulu
- (Maldives) Ali Haafiz
- (Uzbekistan) Dilshod Rakhmatov

3 goals

- (Afghanistan) Mehran Gholami
- (Afghanistan) Reza Hossein Poor
- (Bahrain) Jassam Saleh Anan
- (Indonesia) Evan Soumilena
- (Indonesia) Syauqi Saud
- (Iran) Amirhossein Daoudi
- (Iran) Mahdi Karimi
- (Iraq) Salim Al-Husaynat
- (Iraq) Waleed Al-Mayali
- (Japan) Arthur Oliveira
- (Palestine) Mousa Harara
- (Saudi Arabia) Abdullah Mohammed Alaqeeli
- (Tajikistan) Fayzali Sardorov
- (Tajikistan) Idris Yorov
- (Vietnam) Dương Ngọc Linh
- (Vietnam) Nguyễn Minh Trí

2 goals

- (Afghanistan) Ali Amiri
- (Afghanistan) Farzad Mahmoodi
- (Afghanistan) Mahdi Norowzi
- (Australia) Shervin Keshavarz Adeli
- (Bahrain) Saleh Ahmed Sanjar
- (Bahrain) Falah Abbas Yusuf
- (China) Paiheierding Tudahong
- (China) Wang Bo
- (India) Nikhil Mali
- (India) K Roluahpuia
- (Iraq) Ghaith Arab
- (Japan) Shunta Uchida
- (Kuwait) Mohammad Alajmi
- (Kyrgyzstan) Maksat Alimov
- (Kyrgyzstan) Kairat Kubanychov
- (Lebanon) Ahmed Kheir El Dine
- (Lebanon) Georgio El Khoury
- (Lebanon) Mustafa Rhyem
- (Macau) Fong Chi Wa
- (Malaysia) Muhammad Aidil Shahril
- (Myanmar) Myo Thet Aung
- (Myanmar) Nyein Min Soe
- (Nepal) Sumit Shrestha
- (Palestine) Zaher Alsamahi
- (Palestine) Ahmed Mohammed
- (Tajikistan) Muhammadjon Sharipov
- (Thailand) Itticha Praphaphan
- (Thailand) Worasak Srirangpirot
- (Timor-Leste) Joao Paul de Sousa
- (Uzbekistan) Davron Choriev
- (Uzbekistan) Khusniddin Nishonov
- (Uzbekistan) Elbek Tulkinov
- (Vietnam) Châu Đoàn Phát
- (Vietnam) Nguyễn Thịnh Phát
- (Vietnam) Nhan Gia Hưng

1 goal

- (Afghanistan) Bahman Gorgej
- (Afghanistan) Hassan Ali Jafari
- (Afghanistan) Abdul Ghafar Sadeqi
- (Afghanistan) Hosain Hasan Zadah
- (Australia) Daniel Fornito
- (Bahrain) Ahmed Abdulnabi Hamad
- (Bahrain) Salman Fadhel Mahfoodh
- (Bahrain) Salman Maula Muhammad
- (Brunei) Mohd Fardi Farhan
- (Brunei) Abdul Malik Yunus
- (Cambodia) Cheap Reechhee
- (Cambodia) Ken Pouchit
- (Cambodia) Ouk Lak Sam
- (China) Ding Shunjie
- (China) Yakepujiang Maimaiti
- (China) Pan Zhongdi
- (China) Yang Zu
- (Chinese Taipei) Huang Po-chun
- (Chinese Taipei) Huang Wei-lun
- (Hong Kong) Chan Lok Him
- (Hong Kong) Liu Kin Po
- (Indonesia) Alfajri Zikri
- (Indonesia) Ardiansyah Nur
- (Indonesia) Rio Pangestu
- (Iran) Salar Aghapour
- (Iran) Moslem Oladghobad
- (Iran) Mogtaba Parsapour
- (Iran) Mahdi Rostami Ha
- (Iraq) Fadi Al-Iedan
- (Iraq) Abbas Bazooni
- (Japan) Neto Hirata
- (Japan) Tomoki Yoshikawa
- (Kuwait) Abduelleif Alabasi
- (Kuwait) Naser Alalban
- (Kuwait) Bader Almansour
- (Kuwait) Abd Al-Aziz Borashed
- (Kyrgyzstan) Talaibekov Daniiar
- (Kyrgyzstan) Abdurakhim Daniiar Uulu
- (Lebanon) Mario Abou Jaoude
- (Lebanon) Karim Abou Zeid
- (Lebanon) Hassan Alame
- (Malaysia) Awalluddin Nawi
- (Maldives) Abdulla Shafiu
- (Maldives) Ali Shiyah
- (Mongolia) Pagamsürengiin Altantulga
- (Mongolia) Ankhbayar Tumurbaatar
- (Mongolia) Erdenebat Uuganbayar
- (Myanmar) Hlaing Min Tun
- (Myanmar) Thyne Phwet Aung
- (Palestine) Ahmad Massriea
- (Saudi Arabia) Moath Mohammad Alasiri
- (Saudi Arabia) Farhan Ali Alasmari
- (Saudi Arabia) Fahad Awadh Aljohani
- (Saudi Arabia) Abdulilah Alotaibi
- (Saudi Arabia) Saleh Alqarni
- (Saudi Arabia) Nawaf Mubarak Aroan
- (South Korea) Eom Jiyong
- (South Korea) Han Sang-seok
- (South Korea) Kim Yun-young
- (South Korea) Lee Han-wool
- (South Korea) Lee Min-hyeok
- (South Korea) Moon Hee-jae
- (Tajikistan) Sardorov Fayzali
- (Tajikistan) Bahodur Khojaev
- (Tajikistan) Aliev Komron
- (Tajikistan) Umed Kuziev
- (Tajikistan) Samandar Rizomov
- (Thailand) Therdsak Charoenphong
- (Thailand) Panat Kittipanuwong
- (Thailand) Muhammad Osamanmusa
- (Thailand) Sarawut Phalaphruek
- (Timor-Leste) Jose Costa
- (Timor-Leste) Joel Baptista Fernandes
- (Timor-Leste) Miguel Fernandes
- (Timor-Leste) Ervinho Manuel Guterres
- (Timor-Leste) Eufrasio Amaral Soares
- (Timor-Leste) Jacinto Soares
- (Uzbekistan) Ravshan Elibaev
- (Uzbekistan) Jamshit Rakhmatullaev
- (Uzbekistan) Ikhtiyor Ropiev
- (Vietnam) Đinh Công Viên
- (Vietnam) Ngô Ngọc Sơn
- (Vietnam) Phạm Đức Hòa
- (Vietnam) Từ Minh Quang

1 own goal

- (Afghanistan) Hamid Reza Hossaini (against Indonesia)
- (Bahrain) Radhi Alsandi (against Brunei)
- (Hong Kong) Chow Ka Wa (against China)
- (Hong Kong) Lee Wo Ho (against China)
- (India) David Laltlansanga (against Myanmar)
- (Macau) Pedro Tong Antonio (against Indonesia)
- (Macau) So Ka Chon (against Indonesia)
- (Maldives) Ali Haafiz (against Lebanon)
- (Maldives) Saamin Mohamed Naseer (against Iran)
- (Palestine) Imad Fahjan (against Tajikistan)
- (Palestine) Ahmed Mohammed (against Tajikistan)

== Qualified teams for the 2024 AFC Futsal Asian Cup ==
Of the 16 teams qualified, 11 teams were returning after appearing in the 2022 edition.

Afghanistan were the only debutant in the final tournament, while Australia marked their return for the first time in 8 years. China, Kyrgyzstan and Myanmar also qualified for the first time in 6 years. Japan, Iran, Thailand and Uzbekistan were the only four teams to qualify for every edition.

Three nations from the previous edition failed to qualify (Chinese Taipei, Indonesia and Lebanon) and other two nations from the previous edition did not enter to qualifiers (Oman and Turkmenistan).

Team	Method of qualification	Date of qualification	Finals appearances	Last appearance	Previous best performance
Thailand	Hosts	5 September 2023	17th	2022	Runners-up (2008, 2012)
China	Group A winners	13 October 2023	13th	2018	Fourth place (2008, 2010)
Afghanistan	Group B winners	11 October 2023	1st	Debut	None
Saudi Arabia	Group B runners-up	11 October 2023	3rd	2022	Group stage (2016, 2022)
Iran	Group C winners	11 October 2023	17th	2022	Champions (1999, 2000, 2001, 2002, 2003, 2004, 2005, 2007, 2008, 2010, 2016, 2018)
Kyrgyzstan	Group C runners-up	11 October 2023	16th	2018	Fourth place (2006, 2007), Semi-finals (2005)
Vietnam	Group D winners	9 October 2023	7th	2022	Fourth place (2016)
South Korea	Group D runners-up	9 October 2023	15th	2022	Runners-up (1999)
Tajikistan	Group E winners	9 October 2023	12th	2022	Quarter-finals (2007, 2022)
Myanmar	Group E runners-up	9 October 2023	2nd	2018	Group stage (2018)
Kuwait	Group F winners	9 October 2023	13th	2022	Fourth place (2003, 2014)
Bahrain	Group F runners-up	9 October 2023	4th	2022	Quarter-finals (2018)
Uzbekistan	Group G winners	9 October 2023	17th	2022	Runners-up (2001, 2006, 2010, 2016)
Iraq	Group G runners-up	9 October 2023	13th	2022	Fourth place (2018)
Japan	Group H winners	11 October 2023	17th	2022	Champions (2006, 2012, 2014, 2022)
Australia	Group H runners-up	11 October 2023	8th	2016	Fourth place (2012)
