= Nikhil Mali =

Indian football and futsal player (born 1996)

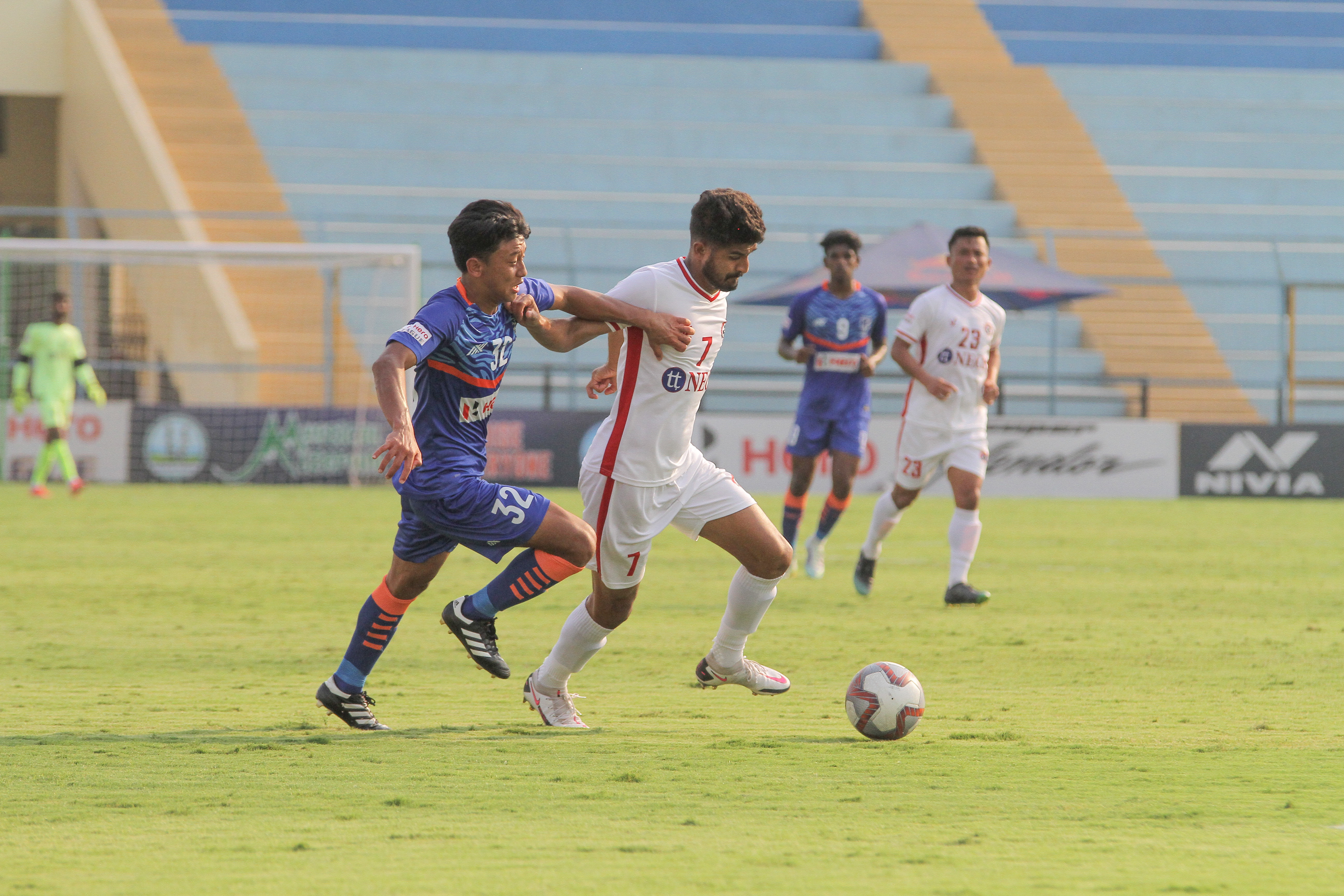
- Nikhil Mali playing for Aizawl

Personal information
- Full name: Nikhil Rajendra Mali
- Date of birth: 11 November 1996 (age 29)
- Place of birth: Lagos, Nigeria
- Height: 1.80 m (5 ft 11 in)
- Position: Winger

Youth career
- DSK Shivajians

Senior career*
| Years | Team | Apps | (Gls) |
| 2020 | Techtro Swades United FC | | |
| 2021 | Delhi FC (futsal) | 5 | (24) |
| 2021–2022 | → Aizawl FC (loan) | 7 | (0) |
| 2022–2023 | FC Bengaluru United | 10 | (3) |
| 2025 | Bhawanipore (futsal) | 4 | (14) |
| 2026 | Progressive Sports Academy (futsal) | 6 | (13) |

International career
| 2023– | India (futsal) | 16 | (9) |
Medal record
Men's futsal
Representing India
SAFF Futsal Championship
| Silver medal – second place | 2026 Bangkok | Team |
- * Club domestic league appearances and goals

Nikhil Rajendra Mali (born 11 November 1996) is an Indian professional football and futsal player. He was part of the Delhi FC side which won the inaugural Futsal Club Championship in 2021. He plays regularly for the Indian national futsal team and was named the most valuable player in two consecutive futsal club championships.

== Youth career ==
Nikhil Mali is a product of DSK Shivajians - Liverpool FC academy. He joined DSK Shivajians in 2015, after being selected during a trial in Pune. After completing his studies, he made a comeback to professional football.

== Club career ==
=== Delhi FC ===
The club participated in the 2021 Durand Cup where Nikhil played an important role in their run to the quarter-finals, scoring in the 1–5 defeat to Indian Super League team FC Goa.

==== I-League 2nd Division ====
Having been nominated by their state association (Football Delhi), Delhi FC were one of 10 teams to compete in 2021 I-League Qualifiers. Mali was part of the Delhi FC team which was placed in group B alongside Kenkre FC, Corbett FC, ARA FC and Kerala United. He appeared in every game and provided 3 assists as Delhi FC topped their group to advance to the final round. However, they finished third and failed to qualify for the Hero I-League.

=== Aizawl FC ===
Having helped Delhi FC win the Delhi Football League, Mali was loaned to Aizawl FC for the 2021–22 I-League.

=== Futsal Club Championship ===
Delhi FC was one of 16 teams to take part in the inaugural Futsal Club Championship in November 2021, placed in group C alongside Niaw Wasa FC, Telongjem FC and TRAU FC. Mali scored 15 goals in the group stage, helping Delhi FC qualify for the semifinals where they defeated Mangala Club 12–7. Mali scored 4 goals, adding 5 more in the final as Delhi FC defeated Mohammedan SC 7–2 to be crowned champions. He was named most valuable player and top goal scorer of the tournament. He also won the following edition with Minerva Academy, being awarded the top scorer again, with 25 goals.

After the I-League season, Nikhil returned to the Club Futsal Championship, leading Minerva Academy and scoring 24 goals in the campaign. Nikhil Mali returned for the fourth edition of Club Futsal Championship, representing Bhawanipore. He spearheaded their charge to the final, becoming the top scorer of the tournament. He scored 8 goals in the quarter-final clash against Minerva Academy, taking his tally to 16 in total.

== International career ==
=== 2024 AFC Futsal Asian Cup Qualification ===
Following the dominant campaign of Club Futsal Championship, Nikhil was selected to represent India. He spearheaded the campaign, appearing in friendlies and qualifiers, eventually scoring two goals.

=== 2026 AFC Futsal Asian Cup Qualification ===
After a stellar Futsal Club Championship, Nikhil was selected as the captain to lead India in the 2026 AFC Futsal Asian Cup qualifiers, helping India get its first ever win with two assists. against Kuwait, Australia and Mongolia.

== International goals ==
| No. | Date | Venue | Opponent | Score | Result | Competition |
|---|---|---|---|---|---|---|
| 1. | 11 October 2023 | Dushanbe, Tajikistan | Palestine | 2–2 | 5–6 | 2024 AFC Futsal Asian Cup qualification |
| 2. | 11 October 2023 | Dushanbe, Tajikistan | Palestine | 4–2 | 5–6 | 2024 AFC Futsal Asian Cup qualification |
| 3. | 15 September 2025 | Beirut, Lebanon | Lebanon | 3–3 | 4–7 | Friendly |
| 4. | 18 January 2026 | Bangkok, Thailand | Nepal | 3–2 | 3–3 | 2026 SAFF Futsal Championship |
| 5. | 22 January 2026 | Bangkok, Thailand | Bhutan | 9–3 | 11–3 | 2026 SAFF Futsal Championship |
| 6. | 22 January 2026 | Bangkok, Thailand | Bhutan | 10–3 | 11–3 | 2026 SAFF Futsal Championship |
| 7. | 22 January 2026 | Bangkok, Thailand | Bhutan | 11–3 | 11–3 | 2026 SAFF Futsal Championship |
| 8. | 24 January 2026 | Bangkok, Thailand | Sri Lanka | 3–0 | 4–1 | 2026 SAFF Futsal Championship |
| 9. | 26 January 2026 | Bangkok, Thailand | Pakistan | 3–1 | 4–1 | 2026 SAFF Futsal Championship |
