= Dawa Tshering (footballer, born 1995) =

Bhutanese footballer

Personal information
- Full name: Dawa Tshering
- Date of birth: 1 April 1995 (age 31)
- Place of birth: Bhutan
- Position: Midfielder

Senior career*
Years	Team	Apps	(Gls)
2009–2015	Yeedzin		
2016–2018	Transport United		
2019–2021	Paro		
2021–2022	Druk Lhayul		
2023	Thimphu Raven		

International career
2015–2016	Bhutan	4	(0)
- * Club domestic league appearances and goals

Dawa Tshering is a Bhutanese professional footballer. He made his first appearance in the 1988 World Cup qualifying match against Maldives.
