= Bikrant Narsingh Rana =

Nepalese national futsal player

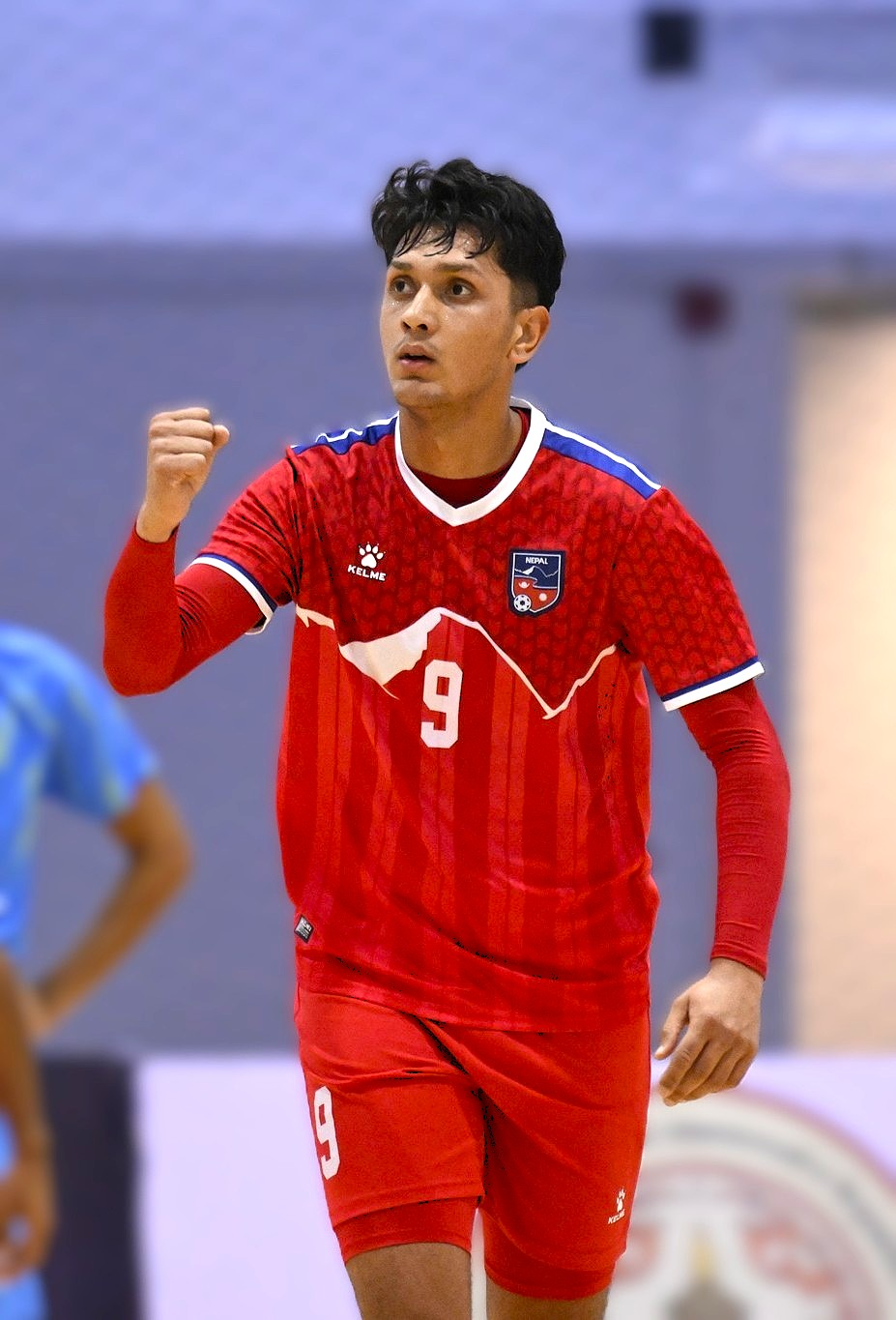

Personal information
- Full name: Bikrant Narsingh Rana
- Place of birth: Nepal
- Position: Midfielder

Team information
- Current team: Shree Bhagawati Club

Senior career*
Years	Team	Apps	(Gls)
- FC Khumaltar
- Dhuku Futsal Hub

International career
2026–	Nepal futsal		(5)
- * Club domestic league appearances and goals

Bikrant Narsingh Rana is a Nepalese futsal player who represents the Nepal national futsal team at international level. He was selected in Nepal's squad for the inaugural SAFF Futsal Championship in 2026, marking a significant milestone in his international career.

== Club career ==
At club level, Rana has competed in Nepal's futsal leagues, where he was named Man of the Match playing for Dhuku Futsal Hub in the 2021 'A' division national futsal league. He has also scored in ANFA league competition for Shree Bhagwati Club in the ANFA B-Division league.

== International career ==
Rana was named in the Nepal futsal squad for the 2026 SAFF Futsal Championship held in Thailand. The tournament marked Nepal's participation in the inaugural edition of the regional futsal competition organised by the South Asian Football Federation (SAFF).

=== 2026 SAFF Futsal Championship ===
During the 2026 SAFF Futsal Championship, Rana scored for Nepal in the 3–3 draw with India, helping his side to earn a point in the group stage. Rana was also recognised as a standout performer, being named Star Performer of the Match in that fixture.

In the men's competition of the 2026 SAFF Futsal Championship in Thailand, Nepal drew 4–4 with Pakistan in a high-scoring group stage match played on 20 January 2026. In the 4–4 draw with Pakistan, Rana scored one of Nepal's goals, helping secure the point for his team in the group stage.
