= Ardiya =

Ardiya العارضية
- Area
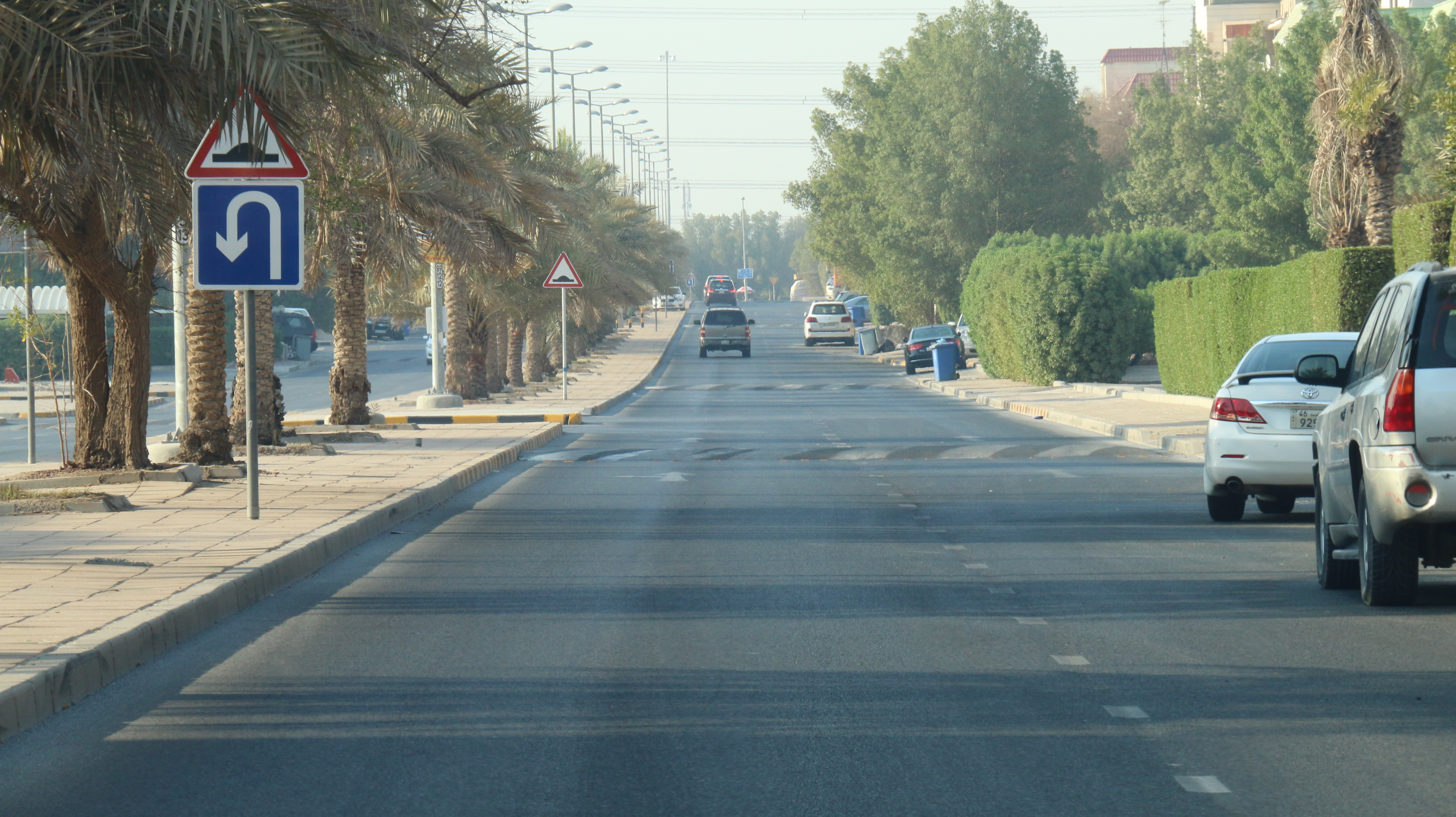
- Street sign marking Ardiya
- Interactive map of Ardiya
- Coordinates: 29°18′N 47°54′E
- Country: Kuwait
- Governorate: Farwaniya Governorate

Population (2024)
  - Total: 65,850
- Time zone: UTC+3 (AST)

Ardiya (Gulf Arabic: العارضية, romanized: il-ʿĀrð̣īya) is an area of Kuwait. It is located in the governorate of Farwaniya near Kuwait City. The population was 65,850 in June 2024. Jaber Al-Ahmad International Stadium, Kuwait's largest stadium, is located in Ardhiya.
