= Nima Wangdi =

Bhutanese footballer

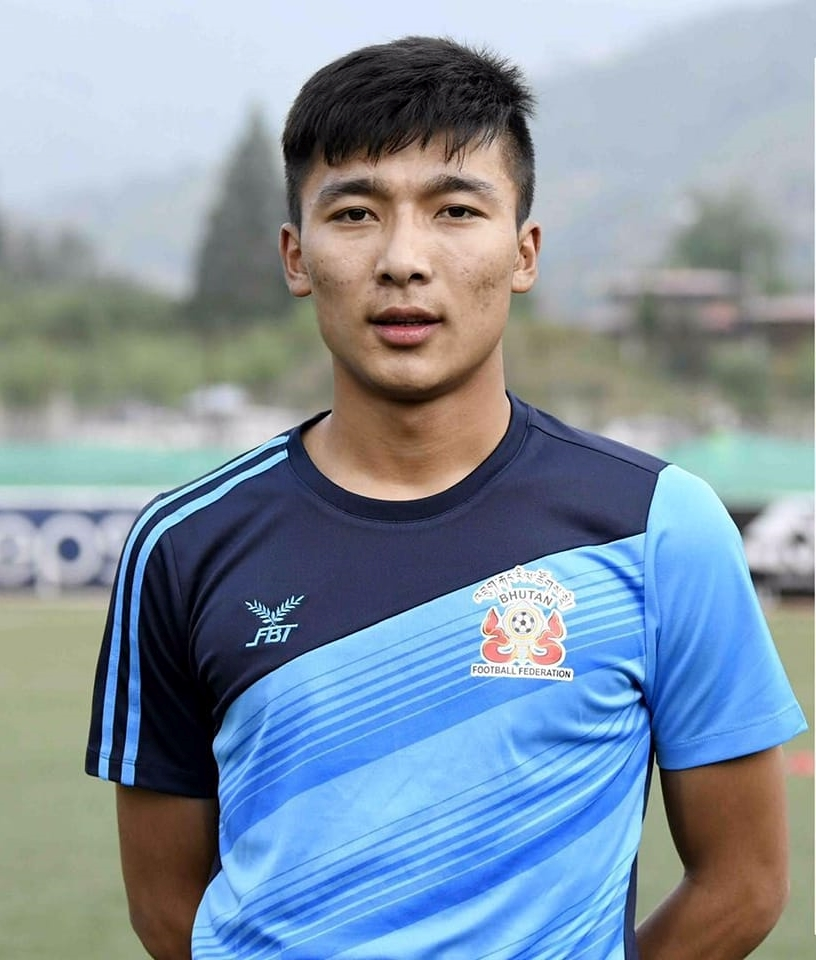
- Chutur Wangdi with Bhutan in 2022

Personal information
- Full name: Nima Wangdi
- Date of birth: 6 December 1998 (age 27)
- Place of birth: Tsholingkhar Gewog, Bhutan
- Height: 1.74 m (5 ft 8 1/2 in)
- Positions: Right back; right back

Team information
- Current team: Paro FC
- Number: 15

Senior career*
Years	Team	Apps	(Gls)
2016	FC Terton		
2017–2024	Thimphu City FC		
2024–	Paro FC		

International career^{‡}
2016–	Bhutan	22	(0)
- * Club domestic league appearances and goals ‡ National team caps and goals as of 17 October 2023

Nima Wangdi (born 6 December 1998), also known as Chutur, is a Bhutanese professional footballer. He made his first appearance in their 2019 AFC Asian Cup qualifying match against Bangladesh, being named in the starting lineup and playing the whole game, and also played the whole game in the second leg of the tie. He currently plays for Paro FC as a defender.
