= Ali Shamal Abdulla =

Maldivian footballer

Personal information
- Full name: Ali Shamal Abdulla
- Date of birth: 21 March 1999 (age 27)
- Place of birth: Fuvahmulah, Maldives
- Positions: Right-back; centre-back

Team information
- Current team: United Victory
- Number: 17

Youth career
- 2016–2018: Club Eagles

Senior career*
Years	Team	Apps	(Gls)
- Club Eagles
2020–	United Victory		

International career
2017	Maldives U19	4	(0)
2019	Maldives U23	2	(0)
2021–	Maldives	2	(0)
2025–	Maldives (futsal)	4	(1)
- * Club domestic league appearances and goals

Ali Shamal Abdulla (born 21 March 1999) is a Maldivian professional footballer who plays as a right-back or centre-back for United Victory and Maldives national team.

== Early life and club career ==
Shamal began playing football as a goalkeeper, in island level tournaments for the neighbourhood club, Dhoondigalona. He later had a brief trial at Maziya before playing for Dhoondigan as a back-up keeper for the 2015 Minivan Championship.

In 2016, he joined Club Eagles and played there three seasons before joining United Victory in 2020.

== International career ==
On 4 June 2021, Shamal made his debut for the Maldives national team against Syria, replacing Hamza Mohamed in the 61st minute, becoming the first player from Fuvahmulah to represent the senior football team.
