= Bhutan national futsal team =

Football team

Bhutan
- Nickname(s): Druk Eleven; Druk Yul; Dragon Boys
- Association: Bhutan Football Federation
- Confederation: AFC
- Most caps: Passang Tshering (6)
- Top scorer: Passang Tshering (3)
- FIFA code: BHU
- FIFA ranking: 141 (24 September 2026)
Home colours	Away colours

First international
- Iran 27–2 Bhutan (Ho Chi Minh City, Vietnam, 23 May 2005)

Biggest win
- None

Biggest defeat
- Thailand 29–1 Bhutan (Incheon, South Korea, 26 June 2013)

FIFA World Cup
- Appearances: None

AFC Futsal Championship
- Appearances: 1 (First in 2005)
- Best result: Plate competition (4th in group)

SAFF Futsal Championship
- Appearances: 1 (First in 2026)

The Bhutan national futsal team represents Bhutan in men's international futsal. The team is controlled by the governing body of football and futsal in Bhutan, the Bhutan Football Federation, which is currently a member of the Asian Football Federation and the regional body the South Asian Football Federation. Futsal used to be very much in an embryonic stage of development in Bhutan, with the team only having played eight competitive matches, ahead of the fourth Asian Indoor and Martial Arts Games held in Incheon, Korea, in 2013. In their first game, they were soundly beaten 29–1 by Thailand, despite scoring through Dawa Dhendup in the first minute. The team is currently ranked 150th and last in the world futsal rankings. By establishing National League and investing in futsal infrastructure, conditions have significantly improved since then.

== History ==
Bhutan first entered an international futsal competition in 2005 when they took part in the 2005 AFC Futsal Championship preliminary round. Travelling to Ho Chi Minh City in Vietnam, they were drawn in Group C for the preliminary round along with Iran, Kuwait and Lebanon. They suffered three heavy defeats, opening with a 27–2 loss to Iran, following that up with a 14–2 loss to Lebanon and ending with a 13–1 loss to Kuwait to finish bottom of their group with no points and a –49 goal difference from their three games.

The team then progressed to the plate competition, where they were drawn against Iraq, Vietnam and the Philippines. Although they were again beaten in all three matches, they performed more creditably. A narrow 3–1 loss to the Philippines was followed by a 6–3 loss to hosts Vietnam before their final match, a 10–4 defeat by Iraq. Finishing bottom of the group again with no points, but this time only a –11 goal difference, they did not qualify for the plate knock-out rounds. Although no placing matches were contested, Bhutan were the best performing of all the fourth-placed teams, all of whom suffered three defeats, finishing with a better goal difference than Guam, Macau and the Maldives.

Bhutan have not entered qualification for an AFC Futsal Championship since, and in fact withdrew entirely from the international futsal scene until July 2013 when they entered the 2013 Asian Indoor and Martial Arts Games. This followed the creation of a formally organised futsal championship which took place in February the same year which, although privately organised, took place in association with the Bhutan Football Federation. The team selected was very hastily arranged, with the decision to submit a team made at the last minute giving manager Pema Dorji only a week to decide on his players. The speed with which the organisation had to be carried out was reflected in the team's performances in the tournament.

Travelling to Incheon, South Korea, Bhutan were drawn in a three team group including Thailand, the reigning Asean and Southeast Asian Games champions and Malaysia. Their first game against Thailand pitted Bhutan against a team vastly superior on paper and one of the top ranked teams in the world. The match started very promisingly for Bhutan as Dawa Dhendup scored in the very first minute to give Bhutan the lead. This was, unfortunately, the high point of the match for the team as Thailand equalised within less than a minute through Kritsada Wongkaeo. Thailand then proceeded to demolish Bhutan in what would be a record win for them and a record loss for Bhutan, scoring a further thirteen times in the first half and another fifteen times in the second half to inflict a 29–1 defeat on Bhutan.

Two days later, Bhutan faced Malaysia in their other group game. Although they conceded fewer goals than against Thailand, they still lost the game 16–0, with Malaysia scoring seven goals in the first half and nine in the second. This match was also a record win for Malaysia and consigned Bhutan to last place in their group and they did not progress. An unnamed Bhutan Olympic Committee commented that the Bhutanese players selected were physically smaller than there opposition and were able to be dominated easily in addition to the fact that they lacked facilities, with the national team training on the futsal pitch in the car park of Changlimithang. The coach and the team also conceded that they were not yet ready to compete at an international level and that the sport had not yet taken off sufficiently within the country.

Upon their return, there was some dissatisfaction within the media about the manner in which the team had been selected, particularly that a number of members of the eleven-a-side team had been selected. The organiser of the championship that had taken place prior to the AIMAG noted that he had seen many players during that tournament who could have made the national side, recommending that the Bhutan Olympic Committee view all tournaments to ensure they select the best players. A young player, Tshering Dorji, argued that the team selected showed organisers favoured those who already played for the national team, whilst another organiser of the futsal championship noted that the skills required for futsal were markedly different to those required for the eleven-a-side version of the game. Manager Pema Dorji responded saying that he considered Futsal to be "basic football", that he expected futsal players to ultimately graduate to the main national squad, that the futsal championship had been considered as part of the selection process and that the team was selected from the fifty two players who turned up for formal selection. Instead, he argued, the reason for defeat was a lack of facilities and time for proper training.

Currently, Bhutan sit 155th and last in the world rankings, calculated on the Elo rating system, with 543 points, although since they have not played the minimum required ten matches, they are technically unranked as of July 2014.

== Competitive record ==
FIFA Futsal World Cup record

FIFA Futsal World Cup
Hosts / Year	Result	GP	W	D*	L	GS	GA
(Netherlands) 1989 to (Uzbekistan) 2024	Did not enter						
Total		0	0	0	0	0	0

AFC Futsal Championship record

AFC Futsal Championship
Hosts / Year	Result	GP	W	D*	L	GS	GA
(Malaysia) 1999 to (Macau) 2004	Did not enter						
(Vietnam) 2005	Plate - group stage	6	0	0	6	13	73
(Uzbekistan) 2006 to (Thailand) 2024	Did not enter						
Total		6	0	0	6	13	73

AFC Futsal Championship history
Year	Round	Score	Result
2005	Preliminary round	Iran 27–2 Bhutan	Loss
2005	Preliminary round	Bhutan 2–14 Lebanon	Loss
2005	Preliminary round	Bhutan 1–13 Kuwait	Loss
2005	Plate competition	Philippines 3–1 Bhutan	Loss
2005	Plate competition	Vietnam 6–3 Bhutan	Loss
2005	Plate competition	Iraq 10–4 Bhutan	Loss

Asian Indoor and Martial Arts Games

Asian Indoor and Martial Arts Games
Hosts / Year	Result	GP	W	D*	L	GS	GA
(Thailand) 2005 to (Vietnam) 2009	Did not enter						
(South Korea) 2013	Group stage	2	0	0	2	1	45
Total		2	0	0	2	1	45

Asian Indoor and Martial Arts Games History
Year	Round	Score	Result
2013	Group stage	Thailand 29–1 Bhutan	Loss
2013	Group stage	Malaysia 16–0 Bhutan	Loss

=== SAFF Futsal Championship ===
SAFF Futsal Championship records
Host/Year	Round	Position	GP	W	D	L	GF	GA
(Thailand) 2026	Group stage	7th	6	0	1	5	11	29
Total	1/1	0 Title	6	0	1	5	11	29

== International opponents ==
As at 23 July 2014:

Opponent	Played	Won	Drawn	Lost	For	Against	Diff	Win %	Loss %
Malaysia	1	0	0	1	0	16	-16	0%	100%
Thailand	1	0	0	1	1	29	-28	0%	100%
Iraq	1	0	0	1	4	10	-6	0%	100%
Vietnam	1	0	0	1	3	6	-3	0%	100%
Philippines	1	0	0	1	1	3	-2	0%	100%
Kuwait	1	0	0	1	1	13	-12	0%	100%
Lebanon	1	0	0	1	2	14	-12	0%	100%
Iran	1	0	0	1	2	27	-25	0%	100%
Total	8	0	0	8	14	118	-104	0%	100%
