= 2004 FIFA Futsal World Championship squads =

This article lists the confirmed national futsal squads for the 2004 FIFA Futsal World Championship tournament held in Chinese Taipei, between November 21 and December 5, 2004.

== Group A ==
=== Spain ===
No.	Pos.	Player	Date of birth (age)	Caps	Club
1	GK	Luis Amado			
2	FP	Julio			
3	FP	Torras			
4	FP	Fran Serrejon			
5	FP	Orol			
6	FP	Pipe			
7	FP	Javi Rodriguez			
8	FP	Kike			
9	FP	Andreu			
10	FP	Limones			
11	FP	Alberto Cogorro			
12	GK	Rafa			
13	GK	Paco Sedano			
14	FP	Marcelo			

== Group B ==
=== Australia ===
No.	Pos.	Player	Date of birth (age)	Caps	Club
1	GK	Gavin O'Brien			
2	FP	Elliott Zwangobani			
3	FP	Brett Hewitt			
4	FP	Scott Manson			
5	FP	Simon Keith			
6	FP	Damian Pilat			
7	FP	Paolo Lombardo			
8	FP	Andrew Nolan			
9	FP	Danny Ngalufe			
10	FP	Ben Singleton			
11	FP	Lachlan Wright			
12	GK	Peter Spathis			
13	FP	Luke Haydon			
14	FP	Adrian Vizzari			

=== Brazil ===
No.	Pos.	Player	Date of birth (age)	Caps	Club
1	GK	Lavoisier			
2	FP	Franklin			
3	FP	Schumacher			
4	FP	Neto			
5	FP	Manoel Tobias			
6	FP	Pablo			
7	FP	Vinicius			
8	FP	Euler			
9	FP	Indio			
10	FP	Fininho			
11	FP	Simi			
12	FP	Falcão			
13	GK	Angelo			
14	FP	Vander Carioca			

=== Thailand ===
Team coach: (Brazil) Glaucio De Oliveila

No.	Pos.	Player	Date of birth (age)	Caps	Goals	Club
1	GK	Somkid Chuenta	5 October 1978 (aged 26)			
2	GK	Parinya Pandee	4 April 1984 (aged 20)			
3	DF	Pattaya Piamkum (captain)	13 June 1968 (aged 36)			
4	MF	Panuwat Janta	14 February 1979 (aged 25)			
5	DF	Anupong Polasak	20 May 1973 (aged 31)			
6	FW	Lertchai Issarasuwipakorn	2 November 1982 (aged 22)			
7	FW	Anucha Munjarern	19 October 1979 (aged 21)			
8	DF	Yutthana Polsak	21 March 1970 (aged 34)			
9	MF	Sompong Phungphook	29 October 1970 (aged 34)			
10	MF	Joe Nueangkord	6 February 1978 (aged 26)			
11	MF	Prasert Innui	31 July 1978 (aged 26)			
12	MF	Jadet Punpoem	24 June 1986 (aged 18)			
13	MF	Sermphan Khumthinkaew	1 October 1981 (aged 23)			
14	DF	Narongsak Khongkaew	17 January 1979 (aged 25)			

== Group C ==
=== United States ===
No.	Pos.	Player	Date of birth (age)	Caps	Club
1	GK	Scott Hileman			
2	FP	Andy Gustaferro			
3	FP	Lee Tschantret			
4	FP	Jamar Beasley			
5	FP	Todd Dusosky			
6	FP	Sean Bowers			
7	FP	Pat White			
8	FP	Johnny Torres			
9	FP	Greg Howes			
10	FP	John Ball			
11	FP	Steve Butcher			
12	GK	Brett Phillips			
13	FP	Joel Shanker			
14	FP	Pat Morris			

=== Japan ===
Head coach: (Brazil) Sergio Sapo

No.	Pos.	Player	Date of birth (age)	Caps	Club
1	GK	Hisamitsu Kawahara	24 November 1978		
2		Takuya Suzumura	13 September 1978		
3		Yoshifumi Maeda	25 April 1977		
4		Yusuke Komiyama	22 December 1979		
5		Ricardo Higa	4 May 1973		F.C. Ryūkyū
6		Osamu Nambata	22 May 1977		
7		Yuki Kanayama	2 September 1977		
8		Kenta Fujii	3 August 1976		
9		Daisuke Ono	25 January 1980		
10		Kenichiro Kogure	11 November 1979		
11		Kiyoshi Sagane	4 October 1973		
12	GK	Hisao Sadanaga	17 January 1977		
13		Kensuke Takahashi	8 May 1982		
14	GK	Ryota Ishiwata	8 December 1976		

== Group D ==
=== Iran ===
Head coach: (Iran) Mohammad Hassan Ansarifard

No.	Pos.	Player	Date of birth (age)	Caps	Club
1	GK	Reza Naseri			
2	FP	Mahmoud Lotfi			
3	FP	Mohammad Keshavarz			
4	FP	Amir Hanifi			
5	FP	Mohammad Hashemzadeh			
6	FP	Siamak Dadashi			
7	FP	Babak Masoumi			
8	FP	Kazem Mohammadi			
9	FP	Vahid Shamsaei			
10	FP	Mohammad Reza Heidarian			
11	FP	Majid Raeisi			
12	FP	Hamid Reza Abrarinia			
13	GK	Kazem Sadeghi			
14	FP	Farhad Fakhimzadeh			
