= Futsal at the Asian Indoor and Martial Arts Games =

- Organiser(s): OCA; AFC
- Founded: 2005
- Region: Asia
- Current champions: M: Iran (5th title); W: Thailand (1st title)
- Most championships: M: Iran (5 titles); W: Japan (3 titles)

The Futsal at the Asian Indoor and Martial Arts Games is a futsal competition of the Asian Indoor and Martial Arts Games. It was first held in 2005 in Thailand.

== Results ==
=== Men ===
Year	Host	Final			Third place match		
Year	Host	Winner	Score	Runner-up	3rd place	Score	4th place
2005	(Thailand); Bangkok	Iran	3–0	Thailand	Uzbekistan	4–2	China
2007	Macau	Iran	7–4	Thailand	Uzbekistan	3–2	China
2009	(Vietnam); Hanoi	Iran	3–3 aet (5–4) pen	Thailand	Uzbekistan	2–0	Turkmenistan
2013	(South Korea); Incheon	Iran	5–2	Japan	Thailand	9–6	Kuwait
2017	(Turkmenistan); Ashgabat	Iran	7–1	Uzbekistan	Japan	1–1 (3–1) pen	Afghanistan
2026	(Saudi Arabia); Riyadh						

=== Women ===
Year	Host	Final			Third place match		
Year	Host	Winner	Score	Runner-up	3rd place	Score	4th place
2005	(Thailand); Bangkok	Uzbekistan	5–4	Thailand	Jordan	9–3	Philippines
2007	Macau	Japan	2–2 aet (3–1) pen	Thailand	Uzbekistan	2–1 aet	Vietnam
2009	(Vietnam); Hanoi	Japan	5–0	Jordan	Thailand	5–4	Iran
2013	(South Korea); Incheon	Japan	2–1 aet	Iran	Thailand	5–1	Indonesia
2017	(Turkmenistan); Ashgabat	Thailand	3–1	Japan	Iran	5–1	China
2026	(Saudi Arabia); Riyadh						

== Medal table ==
Rank	Nation	Gold	Silver	Bronze	Total
1	Iran (IRI)	5	1	1	7
2	Japan (JPN)	3	2	1	6
3	Thailand (THA)	1	5	3	9
4	Uzbekistan (UZB)	1	1	4	6
5	Jordan (JOR)	0	1	1	2
Totals (5 entries)		10	10	10	30

== Participating nations ==
Legend

- QF — Quarterfinals
- R1 — Round 1

=== Men ===
Team	(Thailand) 2005	(Macau) 2007	(Vietnam) 2009	(South Korea) 2013	(Turkmenistan) 2017	(Saudi Arabia) 2026	Years
Afghanistan		R1		R1	4th		3
Bahrain			R1				1
Bhutan				R1			1
China	4th	4th		QF	R1		4
Chinese Taipei				R1	R1		2
Hong Kong		R1		R1	R1		3
Indonesia		R1		R1			2
Iran	1st	1st	1st	1st	1st		5
Iraq				R1			1
Japan		QF	QF	2nd	3rd		4
Jordan			QF		QF		2
Kazakhstan							0
Kuwait	QF	R1	QF	4th			4
Kyrgyzstan	QF	R1			R1		3
Lebanon		QF		QF	R1		3
Macau	QF	R1	R1	R1			4
Maldives					R1		1
Malaysia		QF	QF	R1			3
Palestine				R1			1
Qatar	QF	R1		R1			3
Saudi Arabia		R1		R1			2
Solomon Islands					R1		1
South Korea			R1	QF			2
Tahiti					R1		1
Tajikistan		QF	R1				2
Thailand	2nd	2nd	2nd	3rd	QF		5
Timor-Leste		R1					1
Turkmenistan			4th	R1	QF		3
United Arab Emirates				R1	R1		2
Uzbekistan	3rd	3rd	3rd	QF	2nd		5
Vietnam		R1	R1	R1	QF		4
Number of teams	8	18	13	22	17		

=== Women ===
Team	(Thailand) 2005	(Macau) 2007	(Vietnam) 2009	(South Korea) 2013	(Turkmenistan) 2017	Years
China				R1	4th	2
Hong Kong				R1	R1	2
Indonesia				4th		1
Iran		5th	4th	2nd	3rd	4
Japan		1st	1st	1st	2nd	4
Jordan	3rd		2nd			2
Malaysia		7th	R1	R1		3
Palestine					R1	1
Philippines	4th	6th				2
Thailand	2nd	2nd	3rd	3rd	1st	5
Turkmenistan					R1	1
Uzbekistan	1st	3rd	R1	R1		4
Vietnam		4th	R1	R1		3
Number of teams	4	7	7	9	7	

== See also ==
- FIFA Futsal World Cup
- AFC Futsal Asian Cup
- AFC Women's Futsal Asian Cup
