= Futsal at the 2005 Asian Indoor Games =

- Venue: Thai-Japanese Youth Center
- Dates: 10–17 November 2005

Futsal at the 2005 Asian Indoor Games was held in Bangkok, Thailand from 10 November to 17 November 2005.

== Medalists ==
Event	Gold	Silver	Bronze
Men	Iran; Reza Nasseri; Morteza Azimaei; Majid Latifi; Mohsen Zareei; Mohammad Hashemzadeh; Hossein Soltani; Majid Raeisi; Kazem Mohammadi; Vahid Shamsaei; Mohammad Taheri; Majid Tikdarinejad; Mostafa Nazari; Mohammad Golzadeh; Arash Sheini	Thailand; Somkid Chuenta; Parinya Pandee; Pattaya Piamkum; Panuwat Janta; Anuwat Pathan; Lertchai Issarasuwipakorn; Anucha Munjarern; Sanphet Kaeochuai; Prasert Innui; Joe Nueangkord; Narongsak Khongkaew; Jadet Punpoem; Sermphan Khumthinkaew; Panupong Aramwiroj	Uzbekistan
Women	Uzbekistan; Yuliya Ahmedova; Mariya Sabirova; Shakhnoza Shukurova; Oliya Ahmedova; Nilufar Hodjaeva; Olga Kim; Komola Usmanova; Makhfuza Turapova; Gulnara Azamova; Olga Makhmudova; Maria Moiseeva; Elena Belova; Elmira Gulamova	Thailand; Wannapa Kanha; Nittaya Mankhong; Benjamas Ruktoum; Sirirat Chumrat; Potjaman Sanguansong; Wanna Srinamngern; Porntip Saekoo; Punyanud Komloy; Duangkamon Kankaeo; Nipa Tiansawang; Hataichanok Tappakun; Thanyaphorn Khlaykam; Duangdon Daengcham; Malisa Thanthawa	Jordan

== Medal table ==
Rank	Nation	Gold	Silver	Bronze	Total
1	Uzbekistan (UZB)	1	0	1	2
2	Iran (IRI)	1	0	0	1
3	Thailand (THA)	0	2	0	2
4	Jordan (JOR)	0	0	1	1
Totals (4 entries)		2	2	2	6

== Results ==
=== Men ===
==== Preliminary round ====
===== Group A =====
Pos	Team	Pld	W	D	L	GF	GA	GD	Pts
1	Iran	2	2	0	0	23	1	+22	6
2	China	2	1	0	1	5	6	−1	3
3	Macau	2	0	0	2	2	23	−21	0

Source: RSSSF
10 November
13:00

Iran	5–0	China
Shamsaei; Zareei; Mohammadi

Thai-Japanese Youth Center Hall 1, Bangkok

11 November
15:00

China	5–1	Macau

Thai-Japanese Youth Center Hall 1, Bangkok

12 November
11:00

Macau	1–18	Iran
		Taheri; Shamsaei; Mohammadi; Tikdarinejad; Sheini; Zareei; Raeisi; Azimaei

Thai-Japanese Youth Center Hall 1, Bangkok

===== Group B =====
Pos	Team	Pld	W	D	L	GF	GA	GD	Pts
1	Thailand	1	1	0	0	5	0	+5	3
2	Kuwait	1	0	0	1	0	5	−5	0

Source: RSSSF
10 November
17:00

Thailand	5–0	Kuwait
Janta; Nueangkord; Innui; Issarasuwipakorn; Piamkum

Thai-Japanese Youth Center Hall 1, Bangkok

===== Group C =====
Pos	Team	Pld	W	D	L	GF	GA	GD	Pts
1	Kyrgyzstan	2	2	0	0	11	4	+7	6
2	Uzbekistan	2	1	0	1	17	6	+11	3
3	Qatar	2	0	0	2	2	20	−18	0

Source: RSSSF
10 November
15:00

Uzbekistan	2–6	Kyrgyzstan
Odushev		Mamatov; Djetybaev; Riskulov

Thai-Japanese Youth Center Hall 1, Bangkok

11 November
17:00

Kyrgyzstan	5–2	Qatar

Thai-Japanese Youth Center Hall 1, Bangkok

12 November
13:00

Qatar	0–15	Uzbekistan

Thai-Japanese Youth Center Hall 1, Bangkok

==== Knockout round ====
Quarterfinals
14 November
Iran	11
Qatar	0
14 November
Kyrgyzstan	1
China	3
14 November
Thailand	15
Macau	2
14 November
Kuwait	0
Uzbekistan	3

Semifinals
15 November
Iran	4
China	2
15 November
Thailand	4
Uzbekistan	1

Final
17 November
Iran	3
Thailand	0
3rd place
17 November
China	2
Uzbekistan	4

===== Quarterfinals =====
14 November
13:00

Iran	11–0	Qatar
Shamsaei; Raeisi; Tikdarinejad; Latifi; Zareei

Thai-Japanese Youth Center Hall 1, Bangkok

14 November
15:00

Thailand	15–2	Macau
		Cheng Ching Yang; Cheung Ji Yuen

Thai-Japanese Youth Center Hall 1, Bangkok

14 November
17:00

Kyrgyzstan	1–3	China

Thai-Japanese Youth Center Hall 1, Bangkok

14 November
19:00

Kuwait	0–3	Uzbekistan

Thai-Japanese Youth Center Hall 1, Bangkok

===== Semifinals =====
15 November
15:00

Iran	4–2	China
Shamsaei; Hashemzadeh		Zhang Xi; Yan Fei

Thai-Japanese Youth Center Hall 1, Bangkok
15 November
17:00

Thailand	4–1	Uzbekistan

Thai-Japanese Youth Center Hall 1, Bangkok

===== 3rd place =====
17 November
15:00

China	2–4	Uzbekistan
Wu Zhuoxi 10'; Yan Fei 35'		Ahmedov 10'; Buriev 18'; Zakirov 30'; Yusupdjanov 33'

Thai-Japanese Youth Center Hall 1, Bangkok

===== Final =====
17 November
17:00

Iran	3–0	Thailand
Shamsaei 19'; Hashemzadeh 22', 28'

Thai-Japanese Youth Center Hall 1, Bangkok

=== Women ===
==== Preliminary round ====
Pos	Team	Pld	W	D	L	GF	GA	GD	Pts
1	Uzbekistan	3	3	0	0	14	5	+9	9
2	Thailand	3	2	0	1	17	10	+7	6
3	Jordan	3	1	0	2	18	12	+6	3
4	Philippines	3	0	0	3	3	25	−22	0

Source: RSSSF
13 November
15:00

Uzbekistan	5–1	Jordan

Thai-Japanese Youth Center Hall 2, Bangkok

13 November
17:00

Philippines	1–8	Thailand

Thai-Japanese Youth Center Hall 2, Bangkok

14 November
15:00

Philippines	2–6	Uzbekistan
Merlin 4'; Ruffy 11'

Thai-Japanese Youth Center Hall 2, Bangkok

14 November
17:00

Thailand	7–6	Jordan

Thai-Japanese Youth Center Hall 2, Bangkok

15 November
15:00

Uzbekistan	3–2	Thailand

Thai-Japanese Youth Center Hall 2, Bangkok

15 November
17:00

Jordan	11–0	Philippines

Thai-Japanese Youth Center Hall 2, Bangkok

==== Final round ====
===== 3rd place =====
16 November
15:00

Jordan	9–3	Philippines

Thai-Japanese Youth Center Hall 1, Bangkok

===== Final =====
16 November
17:00

Uzbekistan	5–4	Thailand
Kim 8'; Usmanova 17', 32', 36'; Azamova 37'		Kankaeo 5'; Tiansawang 23', 28'; Komloy 24'

Thai-Japanese Youth Center Hall 1, Bangkok
