= AFC Futsal Asian Cup =

- Organiser(s): AFC
- Founded: 1999; 27 years ago
- Region: Asia
- Teams: 16
- Current champions: Iran (14th title)
- Most championships: Iran (14 titles)
- 2026 AFC Futsal Asian Cup

The AFC Futsal Asian Cup, previously the AFC Futsal Championship, is the premier international futsal competition for the Asian Football Confederation (AFC) national teams. It was first held in 1999 and was played annually until 2008; since then it has been played biennially. From 2021, the tournament was rebranded from the AFC Futsal Championship to the AFC Futsal Asian Cup. The competition in a year divisible by four from 2000 to 2028 also serves as the qualification for the FIFA Futsal World Cup (a standalone qualifier for the World Cup will be held starting from the 2032 edition onwards). There are 47 countries and territories that are permitted to compete for qualification into the tournament.

Iran and Japan are the dominant nations being the only two nations to have won the tournament, and Iran is the only nation to have never finished outside the top three. Iran, champions of 14 of the 18 editions of the competition, won 7 straight editions before their streak was broken by Japan. Iran are the current reigning champions, having won the tournament in 2026.

== Results ==
Tournament names

- 1999–2020: AFC Futsal Championship
- 2022–present: AFC Futsal Asian Cup

#	Year	Hosts	Final			Semi-finalists			Number of teams
#	Year	Hosts	Winners	Score	Runners-up	Third place	Score	Fourth place	Number of teams
1	1999; Details	Malaysia	Iran	9–1	South Korea	Kazakhstan	2–2 (a.e.t.) (4–3 p)	Japan	9
2	2000; Details	Thailand	Iran	4–1	Kazakhstan	Thailand	8–6	Japan	9
3	2001; Details	Iran	Iran	9–0	Uzbekistan	South Korea	2–1	Japan	14
4	2002; Details	Indonesia	Iran	6–0	Japan	Thailand	4–2	South Korea	14
5	2003; Details	Iran	Iran	6–4	Japan	Thailand	8–2	Kuwait	16
6	2004; Details	Macau	Iran	5–3	Japan	Thailand	3–1	Uzbekistan	18
7	2005; Details	Vietnam	Iran	2–0	Japan	Uzbekistan and Kyrgyzstan			24
8	2006; Details	Uzbekistan	Japan	5–1	Uzbekistan	Iran	5–3	Kyrgyzstan	16
9	2007; Details	Japan	Iran	4–1	Japan	Uzbekistan	5–3	Kyrgyzstan	16
10	2008; Details	Thailand	Iran	4–0	Thailand	Japan	5–3	China	16
11	2010; Details	Uzbekistan	Iran	8–3	Uzbekistan	Japan	6–1	China	16
12	2012; Details	United Arab Emirates	Japan	6–1	Thailand	Iran	4–0	Australia	16
13	2014; Details	Vietnam	Japan	2–2 (a.e.t.) (3–0 p)	Iran	Uzbekistan	2–1	Kuwait	16
14	2016; Details	Uzbekistan	Iran	2–1	Uzbekistan	Thailand	8–0	Vietnam	16
15	2018; Details	Taiwan	Iran	4–0	Japan	Uzbekistan	4–4 (2–1 p)	Iraq	16
–	2020; Details	Turkmenistan	Cancelled due to COVID-19 pandemic						16
16	2022; Details	Kuwait	Japan	3–2	Iran	Uzbekistan	8–2	Thailand	16
17	2024; Details	Thailand	Iran	4–1	Thailand	Uzbekistan	5–5 (3–1 p)	Tajikistan	16
18	2026; Details	Indonesia	Iran	5–5 (a.e.t.) (5–4 p)	Indonesia	Japan and Iraq			16

== Performance ==
Team	Champions	Runners-up	Third place	Fourth place	Semi-finalists	Total
Iran	14 (1999, 2000, 2001*, 2002, 2003*, 2004, 2005, 2007, 2008, 2010, 2016, 2018, 2024, 2026)	2 (2014, 2022)	2 (2006, 2012)			18
Japan	4 (2006, 2012, 2014, 2022)	6 (2002, 2003, 2004, 2005, 2007*, 2018)	2 (2008, 2010)	3 (1999, 2000, 2001)	1 (2026)	16
Uzbekistan		4 (2001, 2006*, 2010*, 2016*)	5 (2007, 2014, 2018, 2022, 2024)	1 (2004)	1 (2005)	11
Thailand		3 (2008*, 2012, 2024*)	5 (2000*, 2002, 2003, 2004, 2016)	1 (2022)		9
South Korea		1 (1999)	1 (2001)	1 (2002)		3
Kazakhstan (Note: Kazakhstan has no longer competed since 2002 due to switched to UEFA.)		1 (2000)	1 (1999)			2
Indonesia		1 (2026*)				1
Kyrgyzstan				2 (2006, 2007)	1 (2005)	3
China				2 (2008, 2010)		2
Kuwait				2 (2003, 2014)		2
Iraq				1 (2018)	1 (2026)	2
Australia (Note: Australia is an AFC member from 2006.)				1 (2012)		1
Vietnam				1 (2016)		1
Tajikistan				1 (2024)		1

* = Hosts

== Summary ==
As of 2026 AFC Futsal Asian Cup

Rank	Team	Part	M	W	D	L	GF	GA	GD	Points
1	Iran	18	111	103	4	4	990	164	+826	313
2	Japan	18	106	78	7	21	497	203	+294	241
3	Uzbekistan	18	95	61	9	25	388	237	+151	192
4	Thailand	18	91	61	7	23	487	247	+240	190
5	Kyrgyzstan	17	75	31	12	32	232	275	−43	105
6	Iraq	14	58	23	5	30	201	203	−2	74
7	Kuwait	14	58	20	7	31	212	235	−23	67
8	South Korea	16	63	20	7	36	247	296	−49	67
9	Lebanon	13	52	19	9	24	184	211	−27	66
10	Tajikistan	13	48	15	8	25	148	227	−79	53
11	Australia	9	37	16	2	19	98	129	−31	50
12	China	13	50	16	2	32	187	220	−33	50
13	Indonesia	11	42	14	4	24	142	201	−59	46
14	Vietnam	8	32	14	3	19	91	121	−30	45
15	Chinese Taipei	13	44	10	3	31	128	218	−90	33
16	Kazakhstan	3	15	8	4	3	77	42	+35	28
17	Palestine	3	15	9	0	6	101	70	+31	27
18	Malaysia	13	43	8	2	33	114	253	−139	26
19	Hong Kong	5	20	7	1	12	58	100	−42	22
20	Turkmenistan	7	24	6	1	17	68	141	−73	19
21	Afghanistan	2	10	5	1	4	30	27	+3	16
22	Saudi Arabia	4	12	4	1	7	26	31	−5	13
23	Bahrain	4	14	2	3	9	38	60	−22	9
24	Qatar	3	12	3	0	9	47	70	−23	9
25	Philippines	3	13	1	2	10	21	85	−64	5
26	Myanmar	2	6	1	1	4	9	29	−20	4
27	Macau	4	17	1	1	15	23	167	−144	4
28	United Arab Emirates	1	3	1	0	2	6	8	−2	3
29	Cambodia	1	4	1	0	3	12	46	−34	3
30	Oman	1	3	0	0	3	3	18	−15	0
31	Jordan	2	6	0	0	6	7	25	−18	0
32	Brunei	1	4	0	0	4	7	53	−46	0
33	Bhutan	1	6	0	0	6	13	73	−60	0
34	Maldives	2	9	0	0	9	10	128	−118	0
35	Guam	2	9	0	0	9	8	142	−134	0
36	Singapore	3	11	0	0	11	15	170	−155	0

== Participating ==
=== Comprehensive team results by tournament ===
Legend

- 1st – Champions
- 2nd – Runners-up
- 3rd – Third place
- 4th – Fourth place
- SF – Semifinalist
- 5th – Fifth place
- 6th – Sixth place
- 7th – Seventh place
- 8th – Eighth place
- QF – Quarterfinals
- R2 – Round 2
- R1 – Round 1
- Q – Qualified for upcoming tournament
- •• – Qualified but withdrew
- • – Did not qualify
- × – Did not enter
- × – Withdrew / Banned / Entry not accepted by FIFA
- – To be determined
- – Hosts
- – Not an AFC member

Qualified teams

Team	(Malaysia) 1999	(Thailand) 2000	(Iran) 2001	(Indonesia) 2002	(Iran) 2003	(Macau) 2004	(Vietnam) 2005	(Uzbekistan) 2006	(Japan) 2007	(Thailand) 2008	(Uzbekistan) 2010	(United Arab Emirates) 2012	(Vietnam) 2014	(Uzbekistan) 2016	(Taiwan) 2018	(Kuwait) 2022	(Thailand) 2024	(Indonesia) 2026	Years
Afghanistan	×	×	×	×	×	×	×	×	×	×	•	×	×	•	•	•	QF	QF	2
Australia								R1	QF	QF	QF	4th	QF	5th	×	•	R1	R1	9
Bahrain	×	×	×	R1	×	×	×	×	×	×	•	•	×	•	QF	R1	R1	•	4
Bhutan	×	×	×	×	×	×	R1	×	×	×	×	×	×	×	×	×	×	×	1
Brunei	×	×	×	R1	••	×	×	×	×	•	×	×	•	•	•	×	•	•	1
Cambodia	×	×	×	×	×	R1	×	•	×	×	•	•	×	×	×	•	•	•	1
China	×	×	×	R1	R1	QF	R2	R1	R1	4th	4th	R1	R1	R1	R1	×	R1	•	13
Chinese Taipei	×	×	R1	R1	QF	R1	R1	R1	•	R1	R1	R1	R1	R1	R1	R1	•	•	13
Guam	×	×	×	×	×	R1	R1	×	•	×	•	×	×	×	×	×	×	×	2
Hong Kong	×	×	×	×	R1	R1	R1	R1	R1	×	•	•	•	•	•	•	•	•	5
Indonesia	×	×	×	R1	R1	R1	R1	R1	•	R1	R1	R1	R1	×	•	QF	•	2nd	11
Iran	1st	1st	1st	1st	1st	1st	1st	3rd	1st	1st	1st	3rd	2nd	1st	1st	2nd	1st	1st	18
Iraq	×	×	R1	QF	R1	×	R1	R1	R1	R1	R1	•	R1	8th	4th	R1	QF	SF	14
Japan	4th	4th	4th	2nd	2nd	2nd	2nd	1st	2nd	3rd	3rd	1st	1st	7th	2nd	1st	R1	SF	18
Jordan	×	×	×	×	×	×	×	×	×	×	•	×	×	R1	R1	×	×	×	2
Kazakhstan	3rd	2nd	QF																3
Kuwait	×	×	QF	QF	4th	QF	R2	R1	R1	R1	R1	QF	4th	×	×	QF	R1	R1	14
Kyrgyzstan	R1	R1	R1	QF	QF	R1	SF	4th	4th	QF	QF	QF	R1	6th	R1	•	QF	R1	17
Lebanon	×	×	×	×	R1	QF	R1	R1	QF	QF	QF	QF	QF	R1	QF	R1	•	R1	13
Macau	×	R1	×	×	R1	R1	R1	•	×	•	•	•	•	×	•	•	•	•	4
Malaysia	R1	×	R1	R1	R1	R1	R1	R1	R1	R1	•	•	R1	R1	R1	•	•	R1	13
Maldives	×	×	×	×	×	R1	R1	•	•	•	×	×	×	×	×	×	•	•	2
Myanmar	×	×	×	×	×	×	×	×	×	×	•	•	•	•	R1	•	R1	•	2
Oman	×	×	×	×	×	×	×	×	×	×	×	×	×	×	×	R1	×	×	1
Palestine	×	×	QF	×	R1	×	R1	×	×	×	×	•	×	×	×	•	•	•	3
Philippines	×	×	×	×	×	R1	R1	×	R1	×	•	•	•	•	×	×	×	×	3
Qatar	×	×	×	×	×	×	R1	×	×	•	•	R1	•	R1	•	•	×	×	3
Saudi Arabia	×	×	×	×	×	×	×	×	×	×	×	•	•	R1	•	R1	R1	R1	4
Singapore	R1	R1	R1	×	×	×	×	×	×	×	×	×	×	•	×	×	×	×	3
South Korea	2nd	R1	3rd	4th	QF	QF	R1	•	R1	R1	R1	R1	R1	•	R1	R1	R1	R1	16
Tajikistan	×	×	R1	×	×	×	R2	R1	QF	R1	R1	R1	R1	R1	R1	QF	4th	R1	13
Thailand	R1	3rd	QF	3rd	3rd	3rd	R2	R1	QF	2nd	QF	2nd	QF	3rd	QF	4th	2nd	QF	18
Turkmenistan	×	×	×	••	••	×	R1	R1	R1	R1	R1	R1	•	•	•	R1	×	×	7
United Arab Emirates	×	×	×	×	×	×	×	×	×	×	×	R1	×	•	•	•	×	•	1
Uzbekistan	R1	R1	2nd	QF	QF	4th	SF	2nd	3rd	QF	2nd	QF	3rd	2nd	3rd	3rd	3rd	QF	18
Vietnam	×	×	×	×	×	×	R1	•	×	•	R1	•	QF	4th	QF	QF	QF	QF	8
Total	9	9	14	14	16	18	24	16	16	16	16	16	16	16	16	16	16	16	

=== Teams yet to qualify for finals ===
The following twelve teams which are current AFC members have never qualified for the AFC Futsal Asian Cup.

Team	(Malaysia) 1999	(Thailand) 2000	(Iran) 2001	(Indonesia) 2002	(Iran) 2003	(Macau) 2004	(Vietnam) 2005	(Uzbekistan) 2006	(Japan) 2007	(Thailand) 2008	(Uzbekistan) 2010	(United Arab Emirates) 2012	(Vietnam) 2014	(Uzbekistan) 2016	(Taiwan) 2018	(Kuwait) 2022	(Thailand) 2024	(Indonesia) 2026	Years
Bangladesh	×	×	×	×	×	×	×	×	×	×	×	×	×	×	×	×	×	•	—
Timor-Leste							×	×	×	×	×	×	•	•	×	•	•	•	—
India	×	×	×	×	×	×	×	×	×	×	×	×	×	×	×	×	•	•	—
Laos	×	×	×	×	×	×	×	×	×	×	×	×	•	•	•	×	×	×	—
Mongolia	×	×	×	×	×	×	×	×	×	×	×	•	×	•	•	•	•	•	—
Nepal	×	×	×	×	×	×	×	×	×	×	×	×	×	×	•	•	•	×	—
North Korea	×	×	×	×	×	×	×	×	×	×	×	×	×	×	×	×	×	×	—
Northern Mariana Islands											×	×	×	×	×	×	×	×	—
Pakistan	×	×	×	×	×	×	×	×	×	×	×	×	×	×	×	×	×	•	—
Sri Lanka	×	×	×	×	×	×	×	×	×	×	×	×	×	×	×	×	×	×	—
Syria	×	×	×	×	×	×	×	×	×	×	×	•	×	×	×	×	×	×	—
Yemen	×	×	×	×	×	×	×	×	×	×	×	×	×	×	×	×	×	×	—
Total	9	9	14	14	16	18	24	16	16	16	16	16	16	16	16	16	16	16	

=== Qualification ===
#	Year	Games	Teams	Qualified Teams
1–7	1999 – 2005	No Qualification		
8	2006 AFC Futsal Championship	2006 Qualification	9	4 + 12
9	2007 AFC Futsal Championship	2007 Qualification	8	4 + 12
10	2008 AFC Futsal Championship	2008 Qualification	9	4 + 12
11	2010 AFC Futsal Championship	2010 Qualification	24	12 + 4
12	2012 AFC Futsal Championship	2012 Qualification	24	12 + 4
13	2014 AFC Futsal Championship	2014 Qualification	24	12 + 4
14	2016 AFC Futsal Championship	2016 Qualification	26	13 + 3
15	2018 AFC Futsal Championship	2018 Qualification	30	15 + 1
Cancelled	2020 AFC Futsal Championship	2020 Qualification	31	15 + 1
16	2022 AFC Futsal Asian Cup	2022 Qualification	31	15 + 1
17	2024 AFC Futsal Asian Cup	2024 Qualification	30	15 + 1
18	2026 AFC Futsal Asian Cup	2026 Qualification	31	15 + 1
Total	12	AFC Futsal Asian Cup Qualification	Max:31	Max:16

== FIFA Futsal World Cup ==
Legends

- 1st – Champions
- 2nd – Runners-up
- 3rd – Third place
- 4th – Fourth place
- QF – Quarterfinals
- R2 – Round 2 (1989–2008, second group stage, top 8; 2012–present: knockout round of 16)
- R1 – Round 1
- – Hosts
- – Not an AFC member
- Q – Qualified for upcoming tournament

Team	(Netherlands) 1989	(Hong Kong) 1992	(Spain) 1996	(Guatemala) 2000	(Taiwan) 2004	(Brazil) 2008	(Thailand) 2012	(Colombia) 2016	(Lithuania) 2021	(Uzbekistan) 2024	2028	Total
Afghanistan										R2		1
Australia							R1	R1				2
China		R1	R1			R1						3
Chinese Taipei					R1							1
Hong Kong		R1										1
Iran		4th	R1	R1	R1	R2	R2	3rd	QF	R2		9
Japan	R1				R1	R1	R2		R2			5
Kazakhstan				R1								1
Kuwait							R1					1
Malaysia			R1									1
Saudi Arabia	R1											1
Tajikistan										R1		1
Thailand				R1	R1	R1	R2	R2	R2	R2		7
Uzbekistan								R1	R2	R1		3
Vietnam								R2	R2			2
Total (15 Teams)	2	3	3	3	4	4	5	5	5	5	5	44

== Awards ==
=== Most Valuable Players ===
Year	Player
1999	Not awarded
2000	Not awarded
2001	Not awarded
2002	(Thailand) Anucha Munjarern
2003	(Iran) Vahid Shamsaei
2004	(Iran) Mohammad Reza Heidarian
2005	(Japan) Kenichiro Kogure
2006	(Japan) Kenichiro Kogure
2007	(Iran) Vahid Shamsaei
2008	(Iran) Vahid Shamsaei
2010	(Iran) Mohammad Taheri
2012	(Japan) Rafael Henmi
2014	(Iran) Ali Asghar Hassanzadeh
2016	(Iran) Ali Asghar Hassanzadeh
2018	(Iran) Ali Asghar Hassanzadeh
2022	(Iran) Moslem Oladghobad
2024	(Iran) Saeid Ahmadabbasi
2026	(Iran) Saeid Ahmadabbasi

=== Top Scorers ===
Year	Player	Goals
1999	(Iran) Kazem Mohammadi, Reza Rezaei	18
2000	(Thailand) Therdsak Chaiman	11
2001	(Iran) Vahid Shamsaei	31
2002	(Iran) Vahid Shamsaei	26
2003	(Iran) Vahid Shamsaei	24
2004	(Iran) Vahid Shamsaei	33
2005	(Iran) Vahid Shamsaei	23
2006	(Iran) Vahid Shamsaei	16
2007	(Japan) Kenichiro Kogure	12
2008	(Iran) Vahid Shamsaei	13
2010	(Iran) Mohammad Taheri	13
2012	(Iran) Vahid Shamsaei	7
2014	(Iran) Hossein Tayyebi	15
2016	(Thailand) Suphawut Thueanklang	14
2018	(Iran) Hossein Tayyebi	14
2022	(Iran) Hossein Tayyebi	10
2024	(Iran) Saeid Ahmadabbasi	8
2026	(Thailand) Muhammad Osamanmusa	6

=== Best Goalkeeper ===
Year	Player
1999	Not awarded
2000	Not awarded
2001	Not awarded
2002	Not awarded
2003	Not awarded
2004	Not awarded
2005	Not awarded
2006	Not awarded
2007	Not awarded
2008	Not awarded
2010	Not awarded
2012	Not awarded
2014	Not awarded
2016	Not awarded
2018	Not awarded
2022	(Japan) Guilherme Kuromoto
2024	(Iran) Bagher Mohammadi
2026	(Indonesia) Ahmad Habiebie

=== Fair Play Award ===
Year	Team
1999	Not awarded
2000	Not awarded
2001	Not awarded
2002	Thailand
2003	Iran
2004	Iran
2005	Not awarded
2006	Uzbekistan
2007	Iran
2008	Japan
2010	Iran
2012	Iran
2014	Japan
2016	Iran
2018	Iraq
2022	Uzbekistan
2024	Thailand
2026	Iraq

=== Total Awards (1999–2026) ===
Rank	Team	Numbers
1	Iran	33
2	Japan	7
3	Thailand	6
4	Uzbekistan	2
5	Iraq	2
6	Indonesia	1

== Best Wins ==
=== All Rounds (Wins with 10 and +10 GD) ===
Rank	Winner	Result	Loser	Year
1	Iran	36–0	Singapore	1999
2	Iran	28–0	Singapore	2001
3	China	27–1	Guam	2004
4	Iran	27–2	Bhutan	2005
5	Thailand	25–0	Maldives	2005
6	Iran	24–1	Cambodia	2004
7	Iran	22–0	Macau	2000
8	Thailand	23–2	Turkmenistan	2005
9	Thailand	21–0	Singapore	1999
10	Iran	21–0	Kyrgyzstan	1999
11	Thailand	21–0	Guam	2004
12	China	21–0	Maldives	2005
13	South Korea	23–3	Maldives	2004
14	Kuwait	20–0	Maldives	2004
15	Iraq	20–1	Brunei	2002
16	Iran	20–1	Indonesia	2006
17	Kazakhstan	19–0	Singapore	2000
18	Japan	18–0	Guam	2005
19	Iran	19–2	Tajikistan	2010
20	Iran	17–0	Malaysia	2002
21	Japan	17–0	Macau	2004
22	Iran	18–2	Kuwait	2001
23	Japan	16–0	Philippines	2007
24	Iran	16–1	Chinese Taipei	2002
25	Iran	15–0	Hong Kong	2004
26	Malaysia	15–0	Guam	2004
27	Kuwait	15–1	China	2002
28	China	15–1	Turkmenistan	2005
29	Iran	15–1	Malaysia	2007
30	South Korea	14–0	Singapore	1999
31	Palestine	14–0	Guam	2005
32	Iran	14–0	Turkmenistan	2006
33	Iran	14–0	Tajikistan	2008
34	Iran	14–0	Myanmar	2018
35	Iran	15–2	Lebanon	2003
36	Indonesia	15–2	Guam	2005
37	Thailand	14–1	Brunei	2002
38	Japan	14–1	Macau	2003
39	Iran	14–1	South Korea	2012
40	Iran	16–4	Palestine	2001
41	Lebanon	14–2	Bhutan	2005
42	Uzbekistan	13–1	Cambodia	2004
43	Uzbekistan	13–1	Macau	2005
44	Kuwait	13–1	Bhutan	2005
45	Iran	13–1	Vietnam	2016
46	Japan	12–0	Philippines	2004
47	Japan	12–0	Hong Kong	2006
48	Iran	12–0	Kuwait	2008
49	Iran	12–0	China	2014
50	Japan	12–0	South Korea	2014
51	Iran	15–4	Vietnam	2014
52	Thailand	13–2	Malaysia	2004
53	Iran	13–2	Iraq	2016
54	Uzbekistan	13–2	South Korea	2018
55	Japan	12–1	Macau	2000
56	Kuwait	12–1	Macau	2003
57	Thailand	11–0	Indonesia	2008
58	Thailand	17–7	Kyrgyzstan	1999
59	Palestine	14–4	Philippines	2005
60	Qatar	14–4	Guam	2005
61	Iran	13–3	Indonesia	2004
62	South Korea	13–3	Maldives	2005
63	Kazakhstan	12–2	Tajikistan	2001
64	Iran	12–2	China	2003
65	Japan	11–1	Malaysia	2016
66	Iran	11–1	China	2018
67	Malaysia	10–0	Guam	2005
68	Uzbekistan	10–0	Malaysia	2008
69	Iran	10–0	Uzbekistan	2014

=== Quarter-final ===
Rank	Winner	Result	Loser	Year
1	Iran	18–2	Kuwait	2001
2	Iran	15–4	Vietnam	2014
3	Iran	10–2	Kyrgyzstan	2002
4	Iran	9–1	Lebanon	2008
5	Iran	9–1	Thailand	2018

=== Semi-final ===
Rank	Winner	Result	Loser	Year
1	Iran	13–1	Vietnam	2016
2	Iran	10–0	Uzbekistan	2014
3	Iran	10–2	Kuwait	2003
4	Iran	8–2	Thailand	2000
5	Iran	8–2	Japan	2001

=== Third place ===
Rank	Winner	Result	Loser	Year
1	Thailand	8–2	Kuwait	2003
2	Uzbekistan	8–2	Thailand	2022
3	Thailand	8–0	Vietnam	2016
4	Japan	6–1	China	2010
5	Iran	4–0	Australia	2012

=== Final ===
Rank	Winner	Result	Loser	Year
1	Iran	9–0	Uzbekistan	2001
2	Iran	9–1	South Korea	1999
3	Iran	6–0	Japan	2002
4	Iran	8–3	Uzbekistan	2010
5	Japan	6–1	Thailand	2012

== +40 Minutes Matches ==
=== AET Matches ===
Matches that result defined in overtime (without penalty kicks) = AET

Number	Winner	Result	Loser	Year	Round
1	Uzbekistan	4–3	Thailand	2001	QF
2	Japan	3–2	Thailand	2003	SF
3	Kyrgyzstan	3–2	Lebanon	2007	QF
4	Australia	3–2	Kuwait	2012	QF
5	Thailand	5–4	Iran	2012	SF
6	Tajikistan	2–1	Afghanistan	2024	QF
7	Indonesia	5–3	Japan	2026	SF

=== PSO Matches ===
Matches that result defined in penalty kicks = PSO

Number	Winner	Result	Loser	Year	Round
1	Kazakhstan	2–2 / 4–3	Japan	1999	TP
2	Japan	2–2 / 7–6	Kazakhstan	2001	QF
3	Kuwait	1–1 / 6–5	South Korea	2003	QF
4	Japan	2–2 / 3–0	Iran	2014	F
5	Vietnam	4–4 / 2–1	Japan	2016	QF
6	Uzbekistan	2–2 / 3–1	Thailand	2016	SF
7	Iraq	2–2 / 9–8	Lebanon	2018	QF
8	Uzbekistan	4–4 / 2–1	Iraq	2018	TP
9	Thailand	3–3 / 6–5	Tajikistan	2024	SF
10	Iran	3–3 / 5–4	Uzbekistan	2024	SF
11	Uzbekistan	5–5 / 3–1	Tajikistan	2024	TP
12	Iran	5–5 / 5–4	Indonesia	2026	F

== See also ==
- FIFA Futsal World Cup
- AFC U-20 Futsal Asian Cup
- AFC Futsal Club Championship
- AFC Women's Futsal Asian Cup
