= Malaysia national futsal team =

Men's national sports team

Malaysia
- Nickname(s): Harimau Malaya (Malayan Tigers); Skuad Kebangsaan (National Team)
- Association: Football Association of Malaysia (FAM)
- Confederation: AFC (Asia); AFF (Southeast Asia)
- Head coach: Addie Azwan
- Captain: Khairul Effendy
- Most caps: Addie Azwan (105)
- Top scorer: Addie Azwan (61)
- Home stadium: Panasonic Sports Complex (3°3′22″N 101°32′51″E)
- FIFA code: MAS
- FIFA ranking: 79 (24 September 2026)
- Highest FIFA ranking: 70 (11 December 2025)
- Lowest FIFA ranking: 81 (2024)
Home colours	Away colours

First international
- Malaysia 13–3 Philippines (Kuala Lumpur, Malaysia; 16 August 1996)

Biggest win
- Malaysia 16–0 Bhutan (Incheon, South Korea; 28 June 2013)

Biggest defeat
- Malaysia 0–17 Iran (Jakarta, Indonesia; 24 October 2002)

FIFA World Cup
- Appearances: 1 (First in 1996)
- Best result: Round 1 (1996)

AFC Futsal Championship
- Appearances: 12 (First in 1999)
- Best result: Round 2 (plate), 2005

AFF Futsal Championship
- Appearances: 17 (First in 2001)
- Best result: (silver) Runners-up (2003, 2005, 2010, 2017, 2018)

OFC Futsal Championship
- Appearances: 2 (First in 2013)
- Best result: Champion, 2014

The Malaysia national futsal team represents Malaysia in international futsal competitions and is controlled by the Football Association of Malaysia. They qualified for their first and only FIFA Futsal World Cup in 1996.

== Tournament records ==
=== FIFA Futsal World Cup ===
Malaysia at the FIFA Futsal World Cup
Year	Round	Position	GP	W	D	L	GS	GA	DIF
(Netherlands) 1989	did not enter								
(Hong Kong) 1992	did not enter								
(Spain) 1996	Group Stage	14/16	3	0	0	3	4	24	−20
(Guatemala) 2000	did not qualify								
(Taiwan) 2004	did not qualify								
(Brazil) 2008	did not qualify								
(Thailand) 2012	did not qualify								
(Colombia) 2016	did not qualify								
(Lithuania) 2021	did not qualify								
(Uzbekistan) 2024	did not qualify								
Total	1/10	Group stage	3	0	0	3	4	24	-20

Results:

24 November 1996

Malaysia	1–10	Italy

26 November 1996

Uruguay	4–1	Malaysia

28 November 1996

United States	10–2	Malaysia

=== OFC Futsal Championship ===
Year	Round	Position	GP	W	D*	L	GS	GA
(Australia) 1992	did not enter							
(Vanuatu) 1996	did not enter							
(Vanuatu) 2000	did not enter							
(Australia) 2004	did not enter							
(Fiji) 2008	did not enter							
(Fiji) 2009	did not enter							
(Fiji) 2010	did not enter							
(Fiji) 2011	did not enter							
(New Zealand) 2013^	Runners-up	2/8	5	3	1	1	23	13
(New Caledonia) 2014^	Champions	1/5	4	3	0	1	21	14
(Fiji) 2016	did not enter							
Total	2/11	Champions	9	6	1	2	44	27

^Malaysia is not part of the OFC, invited as a guest nation.

=== AFC Futsal Asian Cup ===
AFC Futsal Asian Cup										Qualification							
Year	Round	Rank	M	W	D	L	GF	GA	GD	M	W	D	L	GF	GA	GD	Link
(Malaysia) 1999	Group stage	8/9	3	0	1	2	11	24	-13	No qualification							
(Thailand) 2000	did not enter									No qualification							
(Iran) 2001	Group stage	13/14	4	0	0	4	11	27	-16	No qualification							
(Indonesia) 2002	Group stage	12/14	3	1	0	2	8	30	-22	No qualification							
(Iran) 2003	Group stage	14/16	3	0	0	3	3	20	-17	No qualification							
(Macau) 2004	Group stage	11/18	3	1	0	2	18	18	0	No qualification							
(Vietnam) 2005	Round 2 (Plate)	19/24	6	2	1	3	25	18	+7	No qualification							
(Uzbekistan) 2006	Group stage	12/16	3	1	0	2	6	15	-9	4	3	1	0	30	13	+17	Link
(Japan) 2007	Group stage	16/16	3	0	0	3	3	26	-23	Automatically qualified							Link
(Thailand) 2008	Group stage	11/16	3	1	0	2	8	19	-11	3	2	1	0	20	12	+8	Link
(Uzbekistan) 2010	did not qualify									3	2	1	0	19	4	+15	Link
(United Arab Emirates) 2012	did not qualify									3	1	1	1	18	11	+7	Link
(Vietnam) 2014	Group stage	13/16	3	1	0	2	8	11	-3	2013 AFF Futsal Championship							Link
(Uzbekistan) 2016	Group stage	16/16	3	0	0	3	4	19	-15	2015 AFF Futsal Championship							Link
(Taiwan) 2018	Group stage	12/16	3	1	0	2	7	9	-2	2017 AFF Futsal Championship							Link
(Turkmenistan) 2020	did not qualify / Cancelled									2019 AFF Futsal Championship							Link
(Kuwait) 2022	did not qualify									2022 AFF Futsal Championship							Link
(Thailand) 2024	did not qualify									3	1	0	2	9	8	+1	Link
(Indonesia) 2026	Group stage	16/16	3	0	0	3	2	17	-15	3	2	0	1	8	5	+3	Link
Total:13/18	Round 2 (Plate)	11/16	43	8	2	33	114	253	-139	19	11	4	4	104	53	+51	–

=== AFF Futsal Championship ===
Malaysia's record at AFF Futsal Championship
Year	Round	Position	GP	W	D	L	GS	GA
(Malaysia) 2001	Third place	3/5	4	2	0	2	16	23
(Malaysia) 2003	Runners-up	2/6	6	4	0	2	21	19
(Thailand) 2005	Runners-up	2/6	6	3	1	2	21	15
(Thailand) 2006	Group stage	5/7	3	1	0	2	11	9
(Thailand) 2007	Third place	3/8	5	1	2	2	21	27
(Thailand) 2008	Third place	3/8	5	4	0	1	22	11
(Vietnam) 2009	Group stage	5/7	3	1	0	2	8	14
(Vietnam) 2010	Runners-up	2/5	5	3	0	2	9	14
(Thailand) 2012	Fourth place	4/10	6	3	0	3	22	24
(Thailand) 2013	Group stage	5/10	4	2	0	2	26	10
(Malaysia) 2014	Group stage	6/10	4	2	0	2	19	12
(Thailand) 2015	Third Place	3/10	6	4	0	2	30	20
(Thailand) 2016	Third Place	3/7	5	3	0	2	33	17
(Vietnam) 2017	Runners-up	2/9	5	3	0	2	21	15
(Indonesia) 2018	Runners-up	2/9	5	4	0	1	26	13
(Vietnam) 2019	Group stage	8/8	3	0	0	3	8	13
(Thailand) 2022	Group stage	5/9	4	2	0	2	20	15
(Thailand) 2024	Group stage	5/9	4	2	0	2	14	5
(Thailand) 2026	Group stage	5/9	3	1	0	2	9	7
Total	18/18	5 Runners-up	85	44	3	38	355	283

=== Asian Indoor and Martial Arts Games ===
[[Futsal at the Asian Indoor anf Martial Arts Games|Asian Indoor and Martial Arts Games Record]]
Year	Round	Position	GP	W	D	L	GS	GA
(Thailand) 2005	did not enter							
(Macau) 2007	Quarter final	8/18	4	2	0	2	13	17
(Vietnam) 2009	Quarter final	8/13	4	2	0	2	16	24
(South Korea) 2013	Group stage	10/22	2	1	0	1	17	4
(Turkmenistan) 2017	did not enter							
Total	4/4	2 Quarter final	10	5	0	5	46	45

=== Southeast Asian Games ===
[[Futsal at the SEA Games|SEA Games Record]]
Year	Round	Position	GP	W	D	L	GS	GA
(Thailand) 2007	Runners-up	2/7	5	3	0	2	19	22
(Indonesia) 2011	Fourth place	4/6	4	1	0	3	10	18
(Myanmar) 2013	Group stage	5/6	2	0	1	1	8	9
(Singapore) 2015	Not held							
(Malaysia) 2017	Runners-up	2/5	4	2	1	1	14	9
(Vietnam) 2021	Group stage	5/5	4	0	1	3	7	20
(Thailand) 2025	Third place	4/4	4	2	0	2	14	12
Total	5/5	Runners-up	23	8	3	12	72	90

=== Tiger's Cup/World 5's Futsal ===
[[Tiger's Cup/World 5's Futsal|Tiger's Cup/World 5's Futsal Record]]
Year	Round	Position	GP	W	D	L	GS	GA
(Singapore) 1997	did not enter							
(Singapore) 1999	Group stage	9/9	2	0	0	2	0	17
(Singapore) 2001	did not enter							
(Malaysia) 2003	Final (Bowl)	9/12	4	2	0	2	14	16
(Malaysia) 2008	Semi-final (Plate)	7/10	4	2	0	2	10	18
Total	3/5	Bowl Winners	8	4	0	4	24	34

*Red border colour indicates tournament was held on home soil.

== Current staff ==
Roles	Names
Manager	Hamdan Mohamed Khalib
Team Manager	Rosmadi Ismail
Security officer	Dali Wahid
Head coach	Vacant
Assistant coach	Chiew Chun Yong
Assistant coach	Jasman Patmee Meera
Assistant coach	Jamhuree Zainuddin
Physiotherapist	Harris Zafran Ahmad Haraman

== Coaches ==
Years	Names
1996	(Malaysia) Wan Jamak Wan Hassan
1996	(Netherlands) Victor Hermans
1999	(Malaysia) Abdul Rahman Ibrahim
2000–2002	(Malaysia) Bahwandi Hiralal
2002–2005	(Brazil) Silvio Sergio Machado
2006–2009	(Malaysia) P. Balakrishnan
2010–2014	(Malaysia) Maizal Hairi Marzuki
2015–2017	(Brazil) Marcelo Serpa Coelho
2017–2023	(Malaysia) Chiew Chun Yong
2023–2025	(Thailand) Rakphol Sainetngam
2025–	(Malaysia) Addie Azwan

== Players ==
=== Current squad ===
The following players were finalised for the 2026 AFC Futsal Asian Cup from 27 January–7 February in Jakarta, Indonesia.

No.	Pos.	Player	Date of birth (age)	Club
	GK	Syaifuddin Syukri	30 July 2002 (age 24)	(Football Association of Malaysia) Selangor
	GK	Muhammad Syawal Sabaruddin	10 February 1997 (age 29)	(Football Association of Malaysia) Selangor
	DF	Aidil Zakwan	(age 19)	(Football Association of Malaysia) Selangor
	DF	Firdaus Ambiah	2 May 1991 (age 35)	(Football Association of Malaysia) Johor Darul Ta'zim
	DF	Harith Na'im	18 January 2000 (age 26)	(Football Association of Malaysia) Pahang Rangers
	DF	Syed Shahrul Niezam	30 October 1999 (age 26)	(Football Association of Malaysia) Terengganu
	MF	Faris Johan	8 May 2000 (age 26)	(Football Association of Malaysia) Selangor
	MF	Khairul Effendy	3 December 1987 (age 38)	(Football Association of Malaysia) Selangor
	MF	Danial Dain	10 September 1996 (age 30)	(Football Association of Malaysia) Johor Darul Ta'zim
	MF	Saad Sani	27 February 1998 (age 28)	(Football Association of Malaysia) Johor Darul Ta'zim
	MF	Ridzwan Bakri	25 August 1994 (age 32)	(Football Association of Malaysia) Johor Darul Ta'zim
	MF	Norakmal Norizal	1 June 2004 (age 22)	(Football Association of Malaysia) Pahang Rangers
	FW	Awalluddin Mat Nawi	2 February 1998 (age 28)	(Football Association of Malaysia) Johor Darul Ta'zim
	FW	Ekmal Shahrin	13 July 2000 (age 26)	(Football Association of Malaysia) Johor Darul Ta'zim

=== Recent call-ups ===
The following players were called up to the squad in the last 12 months.

Pos.	Player	Date of birth (age)	Caps	Goals	Club	Latest call-up
GK	Zainulzahin Sinuan	2 January 2000 (age 26)	-	-	(Malaysia) Pahang Rangers	
DF	Mahadir Harahap	3 July 2000 (age 26)	-	-	(Malaysia) Johor Darul Ta'zim	
DF	Muhammad Aidil Shahril Rosli	23 April 1997 (age 29)	-	-	(Malaysia) Selangor	
MF	Razin Rahim	6 February 1995 (age 31)	-	-	(Malaysia) Pahang Rangers	
MF	Syahir Iqbal	29 September 2005 (age 21)	-	-	(Malaysia) Selangor	
MF	Haiqal Hasnor	(age 23)	-	-	(Malaysia) Selangor	
MF	Syahmie Rosli	(age 20)	-	-	(Malaysia) Pahang Rangers	

=== Previous squads ===
AFC Futsal Championship

- 2018 AFC Futsal Championship squads

Notes:

- ^{INJ} Withdrew due to injury
- ^{RET} Retired from the national team

== Results ==
=== 2025 ===
Win Draw Lose

15 December 2025 SEA Games	Thailand	7–1	Malaysia	Nonthaburi, Thailand
19:00 UTC+7	Worasak 1'; Chaowala 7'; Osamanmusa 8', 20', 37'; Atippong 37'; Ronnachai 39'	Report	Awalludin 12'	Stadium: Nonthaburi Sports Complex Gymnasium

16 December 2025 SEA Games	Malaysia	4–2	Vietnam	Nonthaburi, Thailand
16:00 UTC+7	Harith 4'; Syahir 7', 21'; Awalludin 18'	Report	Nguyễn Đa Hải 3'; Nguyễn Mạnh Dũng 37'	Stadium: Nonthaburi Sports Complex Gymnasium; Referee: Sukhrob Sattorov (Tajikistan)

17 December 2025 SEA Games	Malaysia	8–1	Myanmar	Nonthaburi, Thailand
19:00 UTC+7	Myo Mint Soe 4' (o.g.); Awalludin 7'; Harith 13'; Danial 14'; Firdaus 17'; Syahir 18', 28'; Syed Shahrul 39'		Ridzwan 16' (o.g.)	Stadium: Nonthaburi Sports Complex Gymnasium; Referee: Rawand Fattah Rashid (Iraq)

18 December 2025 SEA Games	Indonesia	2–1	Malaysia	Nonthaburi, Thailand
16:00 UTC+7	Evan Soumilena 4'; Reza Gunawan 13'	Report	Brian Ick 17' (o.g.)	Stadium: Nonthaburi Sports Complex Gymnasium

=== 2026 ===
28 January 2026 AFC Futsal Asian Cup	Iran	4–1	Malaysia	Jakarta, Indonesia
17:00 UTC+7	Derakhshani 1'; Azimi 24'; Tayebi 26'; Oladghobad 28'	Report; Report (AFC)	Awalluddin 39'	Stadium: Jakarta International Velodrome; Referee: Hawkar Ahmed (Iraq), Wahyu Wicaksono (Indonesia)

30 January 2026 AFC Futsal Asian Cup	Malaysia	0–7	Afghanistan	Jakarta, Indonesia
17:00 UTC+7		Report	Mousavi 7'; Mahmoodi 11'; Husseini 12'; Moradi 14'; Hossein Poor 27'; Safari 32'; Qanbari 38'	Stadium: Jakarta International Velodrome; Referee: Timur Ramazanov (Turkmenistan), Abdulrahman Al-Doseri (Bahrain)

1 February 2026 AFC Futsal Asian Cup	Saudi Arabia	6–1	Malaysia	Jakarta, Indonesia
19:00 UTC+7	Rudayni 4'; Mohamed 8', 16', 23'; Al-Johani 12'; Al-Aqeeli 35'	Report	Awalluddin 39'	Stadium: Indonesia Arena; Referee: Lee Po-fu (Chinese Taipei), Leung Chung Yin (Hong Kong)

== Honours ==
=== Continental ===
- Oceanian Futsal Championship

- Champion (1) : 2014
- Runner-up (1) : 2013

=== Regional ===
- ASEAN Futsal Championship

- Runner-up (5) : 2003, 2005, 2010, 2017, 2018
- Third place (4) : 2007, 2008, 2015, 2016
- Fourth place (1) : 2012

- SEA Games

- Silver medal (2) : 2007, 2017
- Third place (1) : 2025
- Fourth place (1) : 2011

- Pre-SEA Games Futsal Test match 2013

- Runner-up

=== Others ===
- KL World 5's

- Bowl Winners (1) : 2003

- Taipei 2004 International Tournament

- Fourth place

- Alcudia International Futsal Tournament

- Third place (1) : 2013

- England International Futsal 4 Nations Tournament

- Fourth place (1) : 2013

- Belt & Road Cup CFA Futsal

- Winners (1) : 2018

== All-time team record ==
The following table shows Malaysia's all-time international record, correct as of 8 September 2019.

Opponents	Played	Won	Drawn*	Lost	For	Against	Diff
Afghanistan	4	1	2	1	13	9	+4
Argentina	1	0	0	1	1	7	−6
Australia	9	0	2	7	15	35	−20
Bahrain	3	1	0	2	8	9	−1
Belgium	1	0	0	1	2	11	−9
Bhutan	1	1	0	0	16	0	+16
Brazil	1	0	0	1	0	15	−15
Brunei	8	6	2	0	49	24	+25
Cambodia	7	6	0	1	62	12	+50
Catalonia	1	0	0	1	1	4	−3
China	4	1	0	3	7	14	−7
Chinese Taipei	7	3	0	4	29	31	−2
Colombia	1	0	0	1	1	12	−11
Czech Republic	1	0	1	0	3	3	0
Egypt	1	0	0	1	3	7	−4
England	3	1	1	1	8	9	−1
France	1	0	0	1	0	2	−2
Guam	2	2	0	0	25	0	+25
Guatemala	1	0	0	3	7	17	−10
Hungary	1	0	0	1	0	12	−12
Indonesia	24	9	3	12	75	86	−11
Iran	5	0	0	5	6	64	−58
Iraq	1	0	0	1	2	8	−6
Italy	1	0	0	1	1	10	−9
Japan	5	0	1	4	6	31	−25
Jordan	1	0	0	1	1	3	−2
Kazakhstan	2	0	0	2	4	12	−8
Kuwait	2	0	1	1	7	8	−1
Laos	3	3	0	0	23	6	+17
Lebanon	5	2	0	3	16	24	−8
Macau	2	2	0	0	14	2	+12
Maldives	2	2	0	0	17	4	+13
Mexico	2	1	0	1	10	4	+6
Myanmar	11	9	1	1	44	24	+20
Netherlands	1	0	0	1	0	5	−5
New Caledonia	2	2	0	0	14	6	+8
New Zealand	2	1	0	1	8	5	+3
Panama	1	0	0	1	1	4	−3
Philippines	10	10	0	0	84	25	+59
Poland	1	0	0	1	1	6	−5
Qatar	3	1	0	2	7	12	−5
Saudi Arabia	3	1	1	1	11	11	0
Singapore	4	2	1	1	21	9	+12
Solomon Islands	1	1	0	0	4	1	+3
South Africa	1	1	0	0	4	2	+2
South Korea	1	1	0	0	4	3	+1
Spain	1	0	0	1	0	15	−15
(French Polynesia) Tahiti	2	1	1	0	8	5	+3
Tajikistan	1	0	0	1	1	9	−8
Timor-Leste	4	4	0	0	28	7	+21
Thailand	26	0	1	26	30	168	−138
Turkmenistan	2	0	2	0	12	12	0
United States	2	0	0	2	3	18	−15
Uruguay	2	0	0	2	4	9	−5
Uzbekistan	9	0	0	9	15	64	−49
Vanuatu	1	1	0	0	9	5	+4
Vietnam	24	8	4	12	74	82	-8
Total	226	83	25	119	820	986	−166

*Draws include knockout matches decided on penalty kicks.

== Player history ==
Players in bold are still active. As of 16 August 2014.

=== Top goalscorers ===
#	Name	Career	Goals	Caps	Position
1	Addie Azwan	2002–2011	61	105	Pivot
2	Saiful Mohd Noor	2001–2008	35		Ala
3	**Fawzul Hadzir**	2012–	31	48	Ala
4	**Qaiser Heshaam**	2009–	28	74	Ala
4	**Shamsul Akmar**	2012–	28		Ala
5	Fadhil Yusoff	2004–2009	24		Ala
6	Muizuddin Haris	2006–2013	22	93	Ala
7	Ruzaley Aziz	2003–2011	21		Pivot
8	**Asmie Amir**	2011–	20		Pivot
9	**Khairul Effendy**	2009–	18		Ala
9	Feroz Karnim	2003–2008	18		Ala
10	Faizul Gaffar	2002–2007	16		Fixo
10	**Ali Mahat**	2010–	16		Pivot
11	Fadzil Karnim	2007–2010	14		Ala
12	Jamhuri Zainuddin	2003–2009	13		Fixo
12	**Abu Haniffa**	2011–	13		Fixo
13	**Saiful Nizam**	2012–	12		Pivot
14	Ng Boon Leong	2004–2006	11		Ala
14	Rizal Rahim	2004–2007	11		Pivot
15	Safar Mohammad	2008–2012	10		Pivot

== Notable former players ==
- Anuar Jusoh
- Azman Adnan
- Mazran Ramli
- Azrul Amri Burhan
- Dollah Salleh
- Mudzar Mohamad
- Nazri Yunus
- Jamhuri Zainuddin
- Mior Zaki
- Faizul Gaffar
- Jerry Dinesh
- Fadzhim Khushaini
- Feroz Karnim
- Saiful Mohd Noor
- Rizal Rahim
- Zaidi Ibrahim
- Fairuz Mohd Noor
- Maizal Hairi Marzuki
- Addie Azwan
- Raizuwah Idris
- Khairul Azman Mohamed
- Lim Seng Kong
- Rosdee Sulong
- Zainal Abidin Hassan
- Zami Mohamed Nor
- Mohd Noor Derus
- Azmin Azram Abdul Aziz
- Yap Wai Loon
- Idris Abdul Karim
- Nazzab Hidzan
- Chiew Chun Yong
- Faris Ahmad
- Faidi Zakaria
- Ng Boon Leong
- Ruzaley Aziz
- S. Sathiyaseelan
- Fadhil Yusoff
- S. Devandran
- Fadzil Karnim
- Safar Mohammad
- Muizuddin Haris

== See also ==
- MPFL Division 1
- MPFL Division 2
- Malaysia Futsal Cup
