= 1992 FIFA Futsal World Championship qualification (AFC) =

Tournament details
- Host country: Hong Kong
- Dates: May 1–3
- Teams: 6 (from 1 confederation)
- Venue(s): (in 1 host city)

Tournament statistics
- Matches played: 6
- Goals scored: 87 (14.5 per match)

The 1992 FIFA Futsal World Championship qualification (AFC) was held in Hong Kong, from 1 May to 3 May 1992.

== Draw ==
Group A	Group B
Thailand; China; Japan	Iran; Kuwait; Oman

== Group stage ==
=== Group A ===
Team	Pld	W	D	L	GF	GA	GD	Pts	Qualification
China	2	2	0	0	21	9	+12	4	1992 FIFA Futsal World Championship
Japan	2	1	0	1	9	13	-4	2	
Thailand	2	2	0	2	9	17	-8	0	

May 1

China	9 – 4	Japan

May 2

China	12 – 5	Thailand

May 3

Japan	5 – 4	Thailand

=== Group B ===
Team	Pld	W	D	L	GF	GA	GD	Pts	Qualification
Iran	2	2	0	0	25	8	+17	4	1992 FIFA Futsal World Championship
Oman	2	1	0	1	14	9	+5	2	
Kuwait	2	2	0	2	9	31	-22	0	

May 1

Oman	12 – 3	Kuwait

May 2

Kuwait	6 – 19	Iran

May 3

Iran	6 – 2	Oman

== See also ==
- 1992 FIFA Futsal World Championship
