= Sompong Phungphook =

Thai beach soccer and futsal player

Personal information
- Full name: Sompong Phungphook
- Date of birth: 29 October 1970 (age 55)
- Place of birth: Bangkok, Thailand
- Position: Defender

International career
Years	Team	Apps	(Gls)
- Thailand

Sompong Phungphook (born 29 October 1970) is a Thailand national beach soccer team player.

He competed for Thailand at the 2000 and 2004 FIFA Futsal World Cup finals.
