= Khairul Azman Mohamed =

Malaysian footballer (born 1968)

Khairul Azman
Personal information
- Full name: Khairul Azman bin Mohamed
- Date of birth: 5 March 1968 (age 58)
- Place of birth: Kuantan, Pahang, Malaysia
- Height: 1.85 m (6 ft 1 in)
- Position: Goalkeeper

Team information
- Current team: Kedah Darul Aman (Goalkeeper coach)

Youth career
- Pahang

Senior career*
Years	Team	Apps	(Gls)
1985–1995	Pahang	315	(0)
1995–2005	Sabah	249	(0)

International career
1991–1997	Malaysia	40	(0)
1996	Malaysia futsal		
- * Club domestic league appearances and goals

Khairul Azman bin Mohamed (born 5 March 1968) is a former Malaysian footballer who was a goalkeeper for Pahang, Sabah and the Malaysia national team.

== Career ==
Khairul started his football career with Pahang youth team in 1985. At that time he was only seventeen and he was the best youth goalkeeper for Pahang. His impressive performance with the Pahang youth team had attract him to represent Malaysia at the ASEAN School Championship at Jakarta, Indonesia. He was then chosen to be the part of Pahang FA senior squad during 1985 season.

In 1991, he was chosen to be the part of Malaysia national football team. His memorable games at the international arena are against England national football team where Malaysia lost 2–4 against the world giant. 1993 saw him clinch his first international title after helping Malaysia to defeat South Korea 3–1 at the 1993 Merdeka Tournament.

During his time with Pahang, he helped the Tok Gajah to win 1992 Malaysia Cup and runners-up during 1994 and 1995 Malaysia Cup. After the 1995 season ended without winning any trophy, he transferred to Sabah FA, East Malaysia.

During his days with Sabah FA, he enjoyed many great success with The Rhinos. He won the Malaysian FA Cup in his first season with Sabah. Then, he helped Sabah to clinch their first Malaysian League title at 1996 season and brought Sabah to their first Malaysia Cup final. Sabah eventually lost their first final to Selangor by penalties but his impressive performance voted him as the Best Player during 1996 Malaysia Cup. He was then chosen to represent Malaysia at the 1996 Tiger Cup. He helped the Malaysia national football team to finish second after losing to Thailand 1–0.

He also played for Malaysia national futsal team, and was in the squad that took part in the 1996 FIFA Futsal World Championship in Spain.

In 2002 and 2003 season he helped Sabah to their second and third finals. However, he again failed to help Sabah to clinch Malaysia Cup title after again losing to Selangor 1–0 in 2002 and 3–0 to Selangor MPPJ FC in 2003. He officially retired from football during 2005 season after he failed to recover from an injury.

== Coaching career ==
After retired from playing football, Khairul Azman decided to become goalkeeper coach. He worked as a Sabah FA goalkeeper coach for four years and produce talent like Sabah's current goalkeeper Irwan Jamil. For the 2009 season Sabah FA replaced him for new senior team goalkeeper coach, Awal Taham.

In 2013, he moves to Darul Takzim FC to become their new goalkeepers' coach.

== Life after retirement ==
Khairul now leads a simple and quiet life with his wife Khairiah alias Caren John Bion in Penampang and their child. Khairul is currently unemployed and depends solely on a monthly pension of RM540 from the Social Security Organisation. His right knee does not have any ligaments, tendon or meniscus, key components that links limbs. His left knee is without ligaments and tendon. He has stated that he could not afford the RM16,000 needed for the operation to do tendon or ligament replacements. In an interview with New Straits Times he said "if I can have this surgery, I wish to return to coaching or even contribute to sports development in whatever manner. I will advise young athletes to take care of their health and not end up like me."

== Achievements ==
=== International ===
- Champion 1992 Indonesian Independence Cup
- Champion 1993 Merdeka Tournament
- Runner-up 1996 AFF Championship

=== Club ===
Sabah FA

- Champion 1996 Liga Perdana
- Champion 1995 Malaysia FA Cup
- Runners-up 1996, 2002, 2003 Malaysia Cup

Pahang FA

- Champion 1992 Liga Semi-Pro Divisyen 1
- Champion 1992 Malaysia Cup
- Runner-up 1994 Malaysia Cup

=== Individual ===
- Best Player 1996 Malaysia Cup
