= 2002 AFC Futsal Championship =

Kejuaraan Futsal AFC 2002

Tournament details
- Host country: Indonesia
- Dates: 22–30 October
- Teams: 14 (from 1 confederation)
- Venue: 1 (in 1 host city)

Final positions
- Champions: Iran (4th title)
- Runners-up: Japan
- Third place: Thailand
- Fourth place: South Korea

Tournament statistics
- Matches played: 34
- Goals scored: 307 (9.03 per match)
- Top scorer: (Iran) Vahid Shamsaei (26 goals)
- Best player: (Thailand) Anucha Munjarern

The 2002 AFC Futsal Championship was held in Jakarta, Indonesia from 22 to 30 October 2002.

== Venue ==
Jakarta
Istora Gelora Bung Karno
Capacity: 10,000
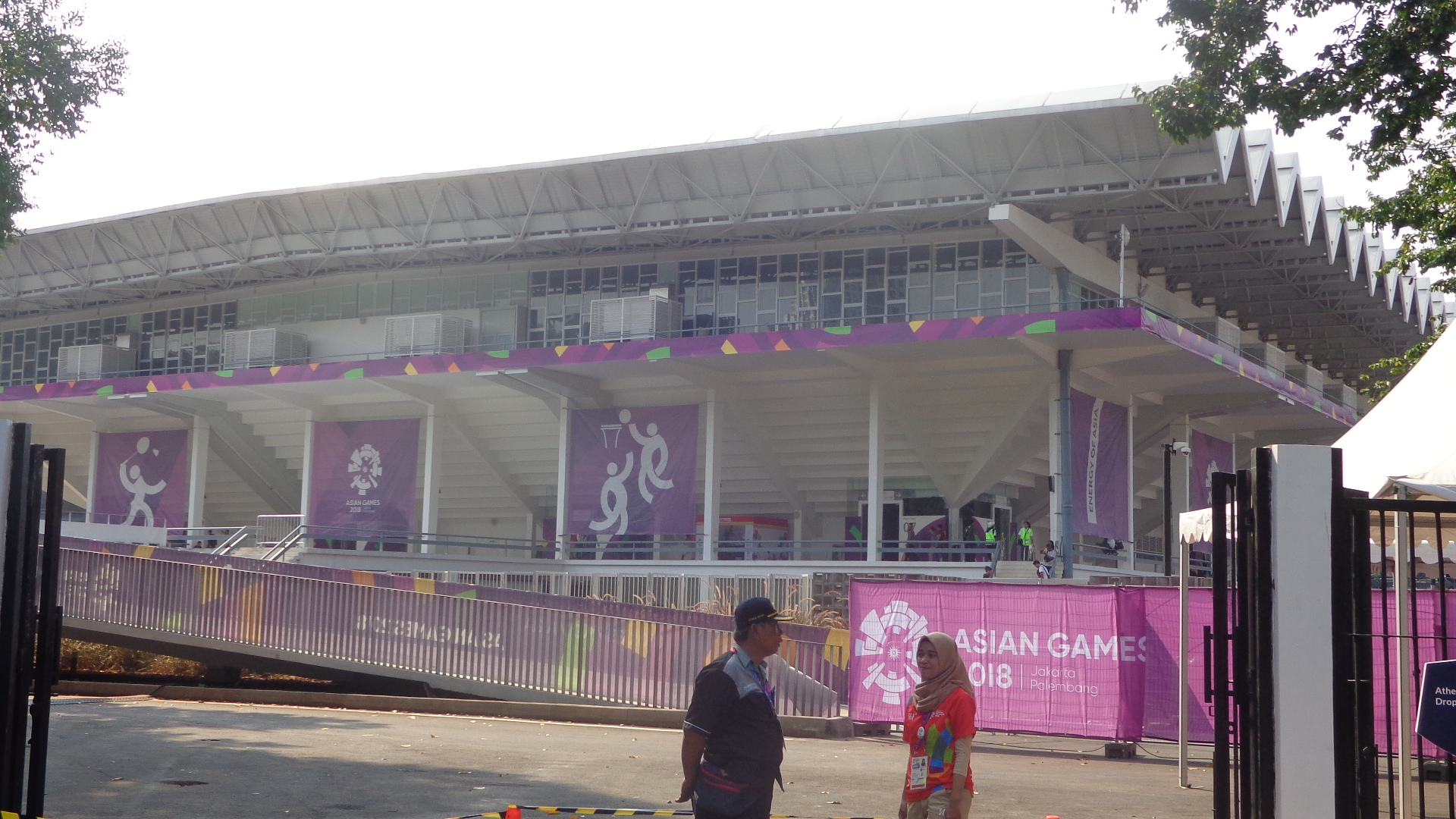

== Draw ==
Group A	Group B	Group C
South Korea; Thailand; Iraq; Bahrain; Brunei	Iran; Uzbekistan; Chinese Taipei; Malaysia; ~~Turkmenistan~~	Indonesia; Japan; Kuwait; Kyrgyzstan; China

== Group stage ==
=== Group A ===
Team	Pld	W	D	L	GF	GA	GD	Pts
Thailand	4	4	0	0	33	8	+25	12
South Korea	4	2	1	1	26	16	+10	7
Iraq	4	2	0	2	35	13	+22	6
Bahrain	4	1	1	2	18	29	−11	4
Brunei	4	0	0	4	7	53	−46	0

22 October 2002
10:00

South Korea	5–5	Bahrain

Istora Senayan, Jakarta

22 October 2002
11:45

Brunei	1–14	Thailand

Istora Senayan, Jakarta

23 October 2002
10:00

Thailand	12–4	Bahrain

Istora Senayan, Jakarta

23 October 2002
11:45

Iraq	5–8	South Korea

Istora Senayan, Jakarta

24 October 2002
10:00

Brunei	1–20	Iraq

Istora Senayan, Jakarta

24 October 2002
11:45

Thailand	4–2	South Korea

Istora Senayan, Jakarta

25 October 2002
08:30

South Korea	11–2	Brunei

Istora Senayan, Jakarta

25 October 2002
10:15

Bahrain	1–9	Iraq

Istora Senayan, Jakarta

26 October 2002
10:00

Iraq	1–3	Thailand

Istora Senayan, Jakarta

26 October 2002
11:45

Bahrain	8–3	Brunei

Istora Senayan, Jakarta

=== Group B ===
Team	Pld	W	D	L	GF	GA	GD	Pts
Iran	3	3	0	0	38	1	+37	9
Uzbekistan	3	2	0	1	12	7	+5	6
Malaysia	3	1	0	2	8	30	−22	3
Chinese Taipei	3	0	0	3	8	28	−20	0

22 October 2002
13:30

Iran	5–0	Uzbekistan

Istora Senayan, Jakarta

22 October 2002
15:15

Chinese Taipei	6–7	Malaysia

Istora Senayan, Jakarta

23 October 2002
13:30

Malaysia	1–7	Uzbekistan

Istora Senayan, Jakarta

24 October 2002
15:15

Malaysia	0–17	Iran

Istora Senayan, Jakarta

25 October 2002
14:00

Iran	16–1	Chinese Taipei

Istora Senayan, Jakarta

26 October 2002
15:15

Uzbekistan	5–1	Chinese Taipei

Istora Senayan, Jakarta

=== Group C ===
Team	Pld	W	D	L	GF	GA	GD	Pts
Japan	4	4	0	0	16	4	+12	12
Kuwait	4	2	1	1	20	7	+13	7
Kyrgyzstan	4	1	2	1	12	7	+5	5
Indonesia	4	1	1	2	12	11	+1	4
China	4	0	0	4	3	34	−31	0

22 October 2002
17:00

Indonesia	6–0	China

Istora Senayan, Jakarta

22 October 2002
18:45

Kyrgyzstan	2–2	Kuwait

Istora Senayan, Jakarta

23 October 2002
17:00

Kuwait	15–1	China

Istora Senayan, Jakarta

23 October 2002
18:45

Japan	5–1	Indonesia

Istora Senayan, Jakarta

24 October 2002
17:00

Kyrgyzstan	1–2	Japan

Istora Senayan, Jakarta

24 October 2002
18:45

Kuwait	3–2	Indonesia

Istora Senayan, Jakarta

25 October 2002
17:30

Indonesia	3–3	Kyrgyzstan

Istora Senayan, Jakarta

25 October 2002
19:15

China	2–7	Japan

Istora Senayan, Jakarta

26 October 2002
17:00

Japan	2–0	Kuwait

Istora Senayan, Jakarta

26 October 2002
18:45

China	0–6	Kyrgyzstan

Istora Senayan, Jakarta

=== Third placed teams ===
Team	Pld	W	D	L	GF	GA	GD	Pts
Iraq	4	2	0	2	35	13	+22	6
Kyrgyzstan	4	1	2	1	12	7	+5	5
Malaysia	3	1	0	2	8	30	−22	3

== Knockout stage ==
Quarter-finals
October 28 – Jakarta
Thailand	5
Iraq	2
October 28 – Jakarta
Japan	1
Uzbekistan	0
October 28 – Jakarta
Iran	10
Kyrgyzstan	2
October 28 – Jakarta
Kuwait	6
South Korea	7

Semi-finals
October 29 – Jakarta
Thailand	0
Japan	3
October 29 – Jakarta
Iran	7
South Korea	4

Final
October 30 – Jakarta
Japan	0
Iran	6
Third place
October 30 – Jakarta
Thailand	4
South Korea	2

=== Quarter-finals ===
28 October 2002
14:00

Thailand	5–2	Iraq

Istora Senayan, Jakarta

28 October 2002
15:45

Iran	10–2	Kyrgyzstan

Istora Senayan, Jakarta

28 October 2002
17:30

Japan	1–0	Uzbekistan

Istora Senayan, Jakarta

28 October 2002
19:15

Kuwait	6–7	South Korea

Istora Senayan, Jakarta

=== Semi-finals ===
29 October 2002
17:00

Thailand	0–3	Japan

Istora Senayan, Jakarta

29 October 2002
19:00

Iran	7–4	South Korea

Istora Senayan, Jakarta

=== Third place play-off ===
30 October 2002
15:00

Thailand	4–2	South Korea

Istora Senayan, Jakarta

=== Final ===
30 October 2002
17:00

Japan	0–6	Iran
		Shamsaei; Moeini; Pariazar; Heidarian; Dadashi

Istora Senayan, Jakarta

== Awards ==
AFC Futsal Championship 2002 winners

Iran
4th title

Vahid Shamsaei, Siamak Dadashi, Mojtaba Moeini, Hamid Reza Abrarinia, Hamid Shandizi, Mohammad Hashemzadeh, Majid Raeisi, Ahmad Pariazar, Mansour Molaei, Saeid Abdollahnejad, Reza Naseri, Ali Saneei, Mojtaba Ahangaran, Mohammad Reza Heidarian
Coach: (Iran) Mohammad Hassan Ansarifard

- Most Valuable Player
  - (Thailand) Anucha Munjarern
- Top Scorer
  - (Iran) Vahid Shamsaei (26 goals)
- Fair-Play Award
  - Thailand
