= China national futsal team =

Futsal team representing China

China
- Association: CFA
- Confederation: AFC (Asia)
- FIFA code: CHN
- FIFA ranking: 83 ▲5 (8 May 2026)
Home colours	Away colours

First international
- China 9–4 Japan (Hong Kong, 1 May 1992)

Biggest win
- China 27–1 Guam (Macau, China, 20 April 2004)

Biggest defeat
- Brazil 24–1 China (Singapore, Singapore, 5 December 1997)

FIFA World Cup
- Appearances: 3 (First in 1992)
- Best result: Round 1 (1992, 1996, 2008)

AFC Futsal Championship
- Appearances: 11 (First in 2002)
- Best result: 4th place (2008, 2010)

EAFF Futsal Championship
- Appearances: 2 (First in 2009)
- Best result: (gold) Champions (2009, 2011, 2013, 2015)

The China national futsal team represents the People's Republic of China in international futsal competition.

== Tournament ==
=== FIFA Futsal World Cup ===
FIFA Futsal World Cup record
Year	Round	Pld	W	D*	L	GS	GA	Dif
(Netherlands) 1989	did not enter							
(Hong Kong) 1992	First Round	3	0	0	3	7	23	-16
(Spain) 1996	First Round	3	0	0	3	3	18	-15
(Guatemala) 2000	did not enter							
(Taiwan) 2004	did not qualify							
(Brazil) 2008	First Round	4	0	0	4	5	25	-20
(Thailand) 2012	did not qualify							
(Colombia) 2016	did not qualify							
(Lithuania) 2021	did not qualify							
(Uzbekistan) 2024	did not qualify							
Total	3/10	10	0	0	10	15	66	-51

=== Futsal at the Asian Indoor and Martial Arts Games ===
Futsal at the Asian Indoor and Martial Arts Games record
Year	Round	Pld	W	D*	L	GS	GA	Dif
(Thailand) 2005	Fourth place	5	2	0	3	12	15	-3
(Macau) 2007	Fourth place	7	4	1	2	38	18	+20
(Vietnam) 2009	did not enter							
(South Korea) 2013	Quarter Finals	3	2	0	1	10	11	-1
(Turkmenistan) 2017	Group Stage	4	1	1	2	15	18	-3
Total	4/5	19	9	2	8	75	62	+13

=== AFC Futsal Asian Cup ===
AFC Futsal Asian Cup									Qualification							
Year	Round	M	W	D	L	GF	GA	GD	M	W	D	L	GF	GA	GD	Link
(Malaysia) 1999	Did not enter								No qualification							
(Thailand) 2000	Did not enter								No qualification							
(Iran) 2001	Did not enter								No qualification							
(Indonesia) 2002	First Round	4	0	0	4	3	34	-31	No qualification							
(Iran) 2003	First Round	3	0	0	3	9	25	-16	No qualification							
(Macau) 2004	Quarter Final	4	2	0	2	36	9	+27	No qualification							
(Vietnam) 2005	Second Round	6	2	1	3	43	20	+23	No qualification							
(Uzbekistan) 2006	First Round	3	2	0	1	10	8	+2	Automatically qualified							Link
(Japan) 2007	First Round	3	1	0	2	4	12	-8	Automatically qualified							Link
(Thailand) 2008	Fourth place	6	3	0	3	29	21	+8	Automatically qualified							Link
(Uzbekistan) 2010	Fourth place	6	3	0	3	27	25	+2	4	4	0	0	38	9	+29	Link
(United Arab Emirates) 2012	Group stage	3	1	0	2	6	9	-3	4	4	0	0	28	5	+23	Link
(Vietnam) 2014	Group stage	3	0	0	3	4	18	-14	4	3	1	0	18	2	+16	Link
(Uzbekistan) 2016	Group stage	3	1	0	2	6	14	-8	4	3	1	0	15	5	+10	Link
(Taiwan) 2018	Group stage	3	1	0	2	8	18	-10	3	1	1	1	9	7	+2	Link
(Turkmenistan) 2020	Cancelled								3	3	0	0	16	2	+14	Link
(Kuwait) 2022	Withdrew								Withdrew							Link
(Thailand) 2024	Group stage	3	0	0	3	2	7	-5	3	2	0	1	12	7	+5	Link
(Indonesia) 2026	Did not qualify								3	1	0	2	7	9	-2	Link
Total	13/18	50	16	2	32	186	220	-34	28	21	3	4	143	46	+97	–

== Matches ==
Team	Pld.	W	D	L	GF	GA	GD
Afghanistan	2	0	0	2	3	12	-9
Argentina	2	0	0	2	1	7	-6
Australia	5	2	1	2	12	11	+1
Brazil	4	0	0	4	3	40	-37
Chinese Taipei	10	7	2	1	39	13	+26
Cambodia	1	1	0	0	8	1	+7
Croatia	1	0	0	1	0	3	-3
Czech Republic	1	0	0	1	3	5	-2
Timor-Leste	1	1	0	0	20	1	+19
England	2	1	0	1	7	8	-1
Egypt	2	0	0	2	6	12	-6
Finland	1	0	0	1	1	5	-4
Guam	3	3	0	0	63	2	+61
Guatemala	1	0	0	1	1	10	-9
Hong Kong	7	6	0	1	41	10	+31
Hungary	2	0	1	1	3	4	-1
Indonesia	5	2	0	3	18	23	-5
Iraq	3	1	0	2	10	16	-6
Iran	22	1	2	19	30	149	-119
Italy	2	0	0	2	2	21	-19
Japan	15	4	1	10	38	62	-24
Jordan	1	1	0	0	5	1	+4
Kazakhstan	2	1	0	1	7	8	-1
Kyrgyzstan	3	1	0	2	7	16	-9
Kuwait	4	2	0	2	15	21	-6
Lebanon	4	0	1	3	11	15	-4
Macau	3	3	0	0	23	2	+21
Malaysia	4	3	0	1	15	7	+8
Maldives	2	2	0	0	30	3	+27
Mongolia	1	1	0	0	4	1	+3
Myanmar	7	6	0	1	27	14	+13
Morocco	2	0	0	2	4	14	-10
Mexico	4	1	2	1	11	9	+2
Netherlands	6	0	0	6	10	31	-21
New Zealand	3	1	0	2	4	12	-8
Portugal	1	0	0	1	0	15	-15
Qatar	2	1	1	0	6	3	+3
Romania	3	0	0	3	7	10	-3
Russia	2	0	0	2	2	21	-19
Spain	2	0	0	2	6	18	-12
Singapore	1	1	0	0	9	5	+4
South Korea	7	4	1	2	28	23	+5
Tajikistan	2	2	0	0	10	0	+10
Thailand	11	2	4	5	34	36	-2
Turkmenistan	2	2	0	0	21	3	+18
Ukraine	3	0	0	3	2	29	-27
United Arab Emirates	2	1	0	1	3	6	-3
United States	1	0	0	1	1	7	-6
Uzbekistan	10	1	2	7	19	27	-8
Vietnam	12	4	1	7	26	36	-10
Total	198	69	19	111	656	808	-152

== Roster ==
Following is the squad for the 2018 AFC Futsal Championship.

Name	Date of birth (Age)	Club
Goalkeepers
Zhu Bei (朱蓓)	12 February 1991 (age 35)	(China) Wuhan Dilong
Zhou Fan (周凡)	17 June 1996 (age 30)	(China) Dalian Yuan Dynasty
Field Players
Zhang Bin (张彬)	19 April 1988 (age 38)	(China) Nei Mongol Xuelang
Li Shunying (李顺荧)	21 October 1993 (age 32)	(China) Zhuhai Mingshi
Li Zhiheng (李志恒)	21 November 1993 (age 32)	(China) Dalian Yuan Dynasty
Zhuang Jianfa (庄健发)	23 July 1991 (age 35)	(China) Shenzhen Nanling
Xu Yang (徐洋)	14 February 1993 (age 33)	(China) Wuhan Dilong
Zhao Liang (赵亮)	26 March 1988 (age 38)	(China) Dalian Yuan Dynasty
Li Jianjia (李健佳)	16 August 1986 (age 39)	(China) Shenzhen Nanling
Gu Haitao (顾海涛)	12 May 1991 (age 35)	(China) Shenzhen Nanling
Lin Yuchen (林宇辰)	9 January 1993 (age 33)	(China) Dalian Yuan Dynasty
Shen Siming (沈思明)	26 July 1995 (age 31)	(China) Dalian Yuan Dynasty
Peng Boyao (彭搏耀)	24 September 1992 (age 33)	(China) Dalian Yuan Dynasty
Zhang Yameng (张亚朦)	9 August 1990 (age 35)	(China) Wuhan Dilong
