= 2008 FIFA Futsal World Cup qualification – AFC first round =

The 2008 AFC Futsal Championship qualification was held in March 2008 to determine 4 spots to the final tournament in Thailand. The top 11 teams of the 2007 AFC Futsal Championship, and the host nation for the 2008 competition, receive automatic byes to Finals.

== Groups ==
=== Group A ===
Team	Pld	W	D	L	GF	GA	GD	Pts
Malaysia	3	2	1	0	20	12	+8	7
Chinese Taipei	3	2	0	1	16	13	+3	6
Vietnam	3	1	1	1	12	14	−2	4
Maldives	3	0	0	3	8	17	−9	0

26 March 2008
12:00

Malaysia	4–4	Vietnam
Fe. Karnim 8', 39'; Zainal 35', 39'	Report	Đoàn Đình Hồng 2'; Nguyễn Quang Minh 4'; Ngô Anh Dũng 28'; Huỳnh Đông Kha 40'

Matsushita Sports Complex, Shah Alam
Attendance: 100
Referee: Christopher Colley (Australia)

26 March 2008
14:00

Chinese Taipei	4–2	Maldives
Fang Ching-jen 28', 34', 39'; Lin Po-yuan 31'	Report	Haishan 11'; I. Mohamed 24'

Matsushita Sports Complex, Shah Alam
Attendance: 50
Referee: Rey Ritaga (Philippines)

27 March 2008
12:00

Vietnam	4–8	Chinese Taipei
Nguyễn Quang Minh 5'; Huỳnh Bá Tuấn 23', 36'; Nguyễn Anh Khoa 33'	Report	Kuo Yin-hung 11'; Chen Bing-shin 11', 26'; Huang Chiu-ching 12'; Wang Yung-lun 18' (pen.), 38'; Lo Wen-hao 33'; Fang Ching-jen 37'

Matsushita Sports Complex, Shah Alam
Attendance: 300
Referee: Husein Khalaileh (Jordan)

27 March 2008
14:00

Maldives	4–9	Malaysia
V. Ahmed 9'; Yamin 17', 39'; Haishan 36' (pen.)	Report	Saravanakumar 10'; Ahmad 10', 39'; Abdul Aziz 11', 17', 24'; Fe. Karnim 19'; Haris 21', 26'

Matsushita Sports Complex, Shah Alam
Attendance: 50
Referee: Sayfiddin Amanov (Uzbekistan)

28 March 2008
12:00

Malaysia	7–4	Chinese Taipei
Abdul Aziz 3', 24'; Haris 17', 19'; Zainal 22', 30', 37'	Report	Wang Yung-lun 6', 17' (pen.), 19' (pen.); Wang Chih-sheng 7'

Matsushita Sports Complex, Shah Alam
Attendance: 150
Referee: Husein Khalaileh (Jordan)

28 March 2008
14:00

Vietnam	4–2	Maldives
Nguyễn Minh Tuấn 9', 19', 34'; Nguyễn Đình Hoàng 28'	Report	V. Ahmed 23', 24'

Matsushita Sports Complex, Shah Alam
Attendance: 50
Referee: Nurdin Bukuev (Kyrgyzstan)

=== Group B ===
Team	Pld	W	D	L	GF	GA	GD	Pts
Indonesia	4	3	0	1	19	6	+13	9
Kuwait	4	2	1	1	11	6	+5	7
Macau	4	2	1	1	10	8	+2	7
Qatar	4	2	0	2	7	10	−3	6
Brunei	4	0	0	4	2	19	−17	0

26 March 2008
16:00

Macau	4–2	Indonesia
Cheung 12'; Chong Kun Kan 21', 39'; Leong Chong In 36'	Report	Handoyo 6'; Ihsan 34'

Matsushita Sports Complex, Shah Alam
Attendance: 150
Referee: Shinichi Hirano (Japan)

26 March 2008
18:00

Qatar	2–0	Brunei
Gholam 13', 15'	Report

Matsushita Sports Complex, Shah Alam
Attendance: 200
Referee: Wong Yuen Chi (Hong Kong)

27 March 2008
16:00

Brunei	1–6	Kuwait
Johari 14'	Report	Al-Nakkas 5', 20' (pen.); Al-Asfour 7'; Al-Othman 25'; Al-Nagi 26'; Al-Mesned 35'

Matsushita Sports Complex, Shah Alam
Attendance: 50
Referee: Prasert Krutsri (Thailand)

27 March 2008
18:00

Qatar	3–2	Macau
Murtada 7'; Eisa 26', 30'	Report	Leong Chong In 32'; Lam Ka Koi 37'

Matsushita Sports Complex, Shah Alam
Attendance: 175
Referee: Kim Jang-kwan (South Korea)

28 March 2008
16:00

Kuwait	2–1	Qatar
Al-Enezi 7'; Al-Nagi 39'	Report	Eisa 12'

Matsushita Sports Complex, Shah Alam
Attendance: 100
Referee: Li Zhizhong (China)

28 March 2008
18:00

Indonesia	10–1	Brunei
Syaibani 3', 26'; Ladjanibi 9', 15' (pen.), 28'; Irawan 11'; Ihsan 16', 39'; Tamimy 22'; Assegaff 28'	Report	Karim 24'

Matsushita Sports Complex, Shah Alam
Attendance: 120
Referee: Kim Jang-kwan (South Korea)

29 March 2008
14:00

Indonesia	6–1	Qatar
Handoyo 9', 36'; Ladjanibi 24'; Wiyantoro 33'; Syaibani 39'; Ihsan 39'	Report	Gholam 11'

Matsushita Sports Complex, Shah Alam
Attendance: 200
Referee: Shinichi Hirano (Japan)

29 March 2008
16:00

Macau	3–3	Kuwait
Cheung 23', 32'; Leong Chong In 31'	Report	Al-Failakawi 12'; Al-Nagi 22'; Al-Nakkas 30'

Matsushita Sports Complex, Shah Alam
Attendance: 150
Referee: Kim Jang-kwan (South Korea)

30 March 2008
14:00

Brunei	0–1	Macau
	Report	Chong Kun Kan 34'

Matsushita Sports Complex, Shah Alam
Attendance: 75
Referee: Ali Sabah (Iraq)

30 March 2008
16:00

Kuwait	0–1	Indonesia
	Report	Syaibani 9'

Matsushita Sports Complex, Shah Alam
Attendance: 85
Referee: Li Zhizhong (China)

== Qualifiers ==
Host nation

- Thailand

2007 tournament

- Iran
- Japan
- Uzbekistan
- Kyrgyzstan
- Lebanon
- Tajikistan
- Australia
- South Korea
- Iraq
- China
- Turkmenistan

Qualification

- Malaysia
- Chinese Taipei
- Indonesia
- Kuwait
