= 2006 AFC Futsal Championship qualification =

The 2006 AFC Futsal Championship qualification was held in April 2006 to determine 4 spots to the final tournament in Uzbekistan. The top 11 teams of the 2005 AFC Futsal Championship, and the host nation for the 2006 competition, receive automatic byes to Finals.

== Groups ==
=== Group A ===
Team	Pld	W	D	L	GF	GA	GD	Pts
Malaysia	4	3	1	0	30	13	+17	10
Turkmenistan	4	3	1	0	21	7	+14	10
Vietnam	4	1	1	2	15	14	+1	4
Cambodia	4	1	1	2	11	21	−10	4
Maldives	4	0	0	4	2	24	−22	0

18 April 2006

Vietnam	4–4	Cambodia

Kuantan Indoor Stadium, Kuantan

18 April 2006

Turkmenistan	8–0	Maldives

Kuantan Indoor Stadium, Kuantan

19 April 2006

Malaysia	8–6	Vietnam

Kuantan Indoor Stadium, Kuantan

19 April 2006

Maldives	2–3	Cambodia

Kuantan Indoor Stadium, Kuantan

20 April 2006

Turkmenistan	6–2	Cambodia

Kuantan Indoor Stadium, Kuantan

20 April 2006

Malaysia	8–0	Maldives

Kuantan Indoor Stadium, Kuantan

21 April 2006

Malaysia	9–2	Cambodia

Kuantan Indoor Stadium, Kuantan

21 April 2006

Turkmenistan	2–0	Vietnam

Kuantan Indoor Stadium, Kuantan

22 April 2006

Vietnam	5–0	Maldives

Kuantan Indoor Stadium, Kuantan

22 April 2006

Malaysia	5–5	Turkmenistan

Kuantan Indoor Stadium, Kuantan

=== Group B ===
Team	Pld	W	D	L	GF	GA	GD	Pts
Australia	3	3	0	0	24	8	+16	9
Hong Kong	3	1	1	1	18	7	+11	4
South Korea	3	1	1	1	14	8	+6	4
Macau	3	0	0	3	5	38	−33	0

18 April 2006

South Korea	8–1	Macau

Kuantan Indoor Stadium, Kuantan

19 April 2006

Hong Kong	2–3	Australia

Kuantan Indoor Stadium, Kuantan

20 April 2006

Hong Kong	14–2	Macau

Kuantan Indoor Stadium, Kuantan

21 April 2006

South Korea	4–5	Australia

Kuantan Indoor Stadium, Kuantan

22 April 2006

Macau	2–16	Australia

Kuantan Indoor Stadium, Kuantan

22 April 2006

South Korea	2–2	Hong Kong

Kuantan Indoor Stadium, Kuantan

== Qualifiers ==
Host nation

- Uzbekistan

2005 tournament

- Iran
- Japan
- Kyrgyzstan
- Thailand
- Kuwait
- Tajikistan
- China
- Indonesia
- Iraq
- Chinese Taipei
- Lebanon

Qualification

- Malaysia
- Turkmenistan
- Australia
- Hong Kong
