= Parinya Pandee =

Thai futsal player

Personal information
- Date of birth: 4 April 1984 (age 42)
- Place of birth: Ang Thong, Thailand
- Height: 1.71 m (5 ft 7 in)
- Position: Goalkeeper

Team information
- Current team: TOT FC
- Number: 2

International career^{‡}
Years	Team	Apps	(Gls)
2005–	Thailand	53	(0)
- ‡ National team caps and goals as of 13:05, 23 May 2008 (UTC)

Parinya Pandee (Thai: ปริญญา ปั้นดี, born 4 April 1984) is a Thai futsal Goalkeeper, and currently a member of Thailand national futsal team.
