= Narongsak Khongkaew =

Thai futsal player

Personal information
- Date of birth: 17 January 1979 (age 47)
- Place of birth: Chantaburi, Thailand
- Height: 1.68 m (5 ft 6 in)
- Position: Defender

Team information
- Current team: เลิกเล่นแล้ว
- Number: 14

International career^{‡}
| Years | Team | Apps | (Gls) |
| 2003– | Thailand | 34 | (5) |
- ‡ National team caps and goals as of 13:05, 23 May 2008 (UTC)

Narongsak Khongkaew (Thai: ณรงค์ศักดิ์ คงแก้ว, born 17 January 1979) is a Thai futsal Defender, and currently a member of Thailand national futsal team.
