= Pattaya Piamkum =

Thai futsal player (born 1968)

Personal information
- Date of birth: 13 June 1968 (age 58)
- Place of birth: Bangkok, Thailand
- Height: 1.72 m (5 ft 8 in)
- Position: Midfielder

Youth career
- 1981–1983: Taweethapisek School
- 1984–1986: Institute of Physical Education Samut Sakhon
- 1987–1990: Srinakharinwirot University

Senior career*
| Years | Team | Apps | (Gls) |
| 1990–1992 | Rajpracha | 46 | (5) |
| 1993–1995 | Stock Exchange of Thailand | 29 | (2) |
| 1996–1998 | Bangkok Metro | 33 | (7) |
| 1999–2004 | Port Authority | 141 | (15) |

International career
| 1996–2004 | Thailand Futsal | 104 | (79) |

Managerial career
- 2005–2006: Chonburi Bluewave
- 2007: Thailand
- 2008–2010: Vietnam
- 2011–2012: Lampang United Futsal
- 2012–2013: Nakhon Ratchasima Futsal
- 2014–2015: Surat Thani Futsal
- 2015: Singapore
- 2016–: Surat Thani Futsal
- 2023–: Fafage Banua
- 2025–: Myanmar
- * Club domestic league appearances and goals

Pattaya Piamkum (Thai: พัทยา เปี่ยมคุ้ม, born 13 June 1968) is a former Thai Port FC player and is assistant coach of the Thailand national futsal team.

He played for Thailand national futsal team at the 2000 and 2004 FIFA Futsal World Championships. At the 2000 FIFA Futsal World Championship in Guatemala, Piamkum scored the first goal for Thailand in the history of the World Cup against Uruguay on 20 November 2000.

Following his playing career, he managed the Thailand and Vietnam national futsal teams.
