= Somkid Chuenta =

Iran futsal player

Personal information
- Date of birth: 5 October 1978 (age 48)
- Place of birth: Surin, Thailand
- Height: 1.74 m (5 ft 9 in)
- Position: Goalkeeper

Senior career*
Years	Team	Apps	(Gls)
1999–2002	Osotspa	47	(0)
2004–2006	Chonburi Blue Wave (Futsal)	72	(6)
2007	Thai Port	14	(0)
2008	Aktobe BTA (Futsal)	27	(2)
2009	Chonburi Blue Wave (Futsal)	16	(0)
2010–2014	Chanthaburi	14	(0)

International career^{‡}
2001–2009	Thailand Futsal	97	(10)
- * Club domestic league appearances and goals ‡ National team caps and goals as of 13:05, 23 May 2008 (UTC)

Somkid Chuenta (Thai: สมคิด ชื่นตา, born 5 October 1978 in Surin, Thailand) is a former Thai futsal Goalkeeper, and a member of Thailand national futsal team. He is a particularly eccentric player, known for his constant play outside the penalty area as well as his acrobatic style in goal.

== See also ==
- Thailand national beach soccer team
