= Anucha Munjarern =

Thai futsal player

Personal information
- Date of birth: 19 October 1979 (age 47)
- Place of birth: Surat Thani, Thailand
- Height: 1.83 m (6 ft 0 in)
- Position: Forward

Senior career*
| Years | Team | Apps | (Gls) |
- Chonburi Blue Wave

International career^{‡}
| 2000–2008 | Thailand Futsal | 117 | (109) |
- * Club domestic league appearances and goals ‡ National team caps and goals as of 13:05, 23 May 2008 (UTC)

Anucha Munjarern (Thai: อนุชา มั่นเจริญ; born 19 October 1979 in Surat Thani, Thailand) is a retired Thai futsal Pivot who is Thailand national futsal team's all-time top goalscorer. He was regarded as the icon of Thai futsal between 2000-2008 and was hailed as "พ่อมดฟุตซอล" (Thai Futsal Magician) by Thai futsal fans and media.

== Honours ==
=== AFC Futsal Championship ===
- 2000 - Third place
- 2002 - Third place
- 2003 - Third place
- 2004 - Third place
- 2008 - Runner-up

=== ASEAN Futsal Championship ===
- 2001 - Champions
- 2003 - Champions
- 2005 - Champions
- 2006 - Champions
- 2007 - Champions

=== Asian Indoor Games Futsal Championship ===
- 2005 - Runner-up
- 2007 - Runner-up

== Individual ==
=== Best player ===
- MVP AFC Futsal Championship: - 2002
