= Thailand national futsal team =

National sports team

Thailand
- Shirt badge/Association crest
- Nickname(s): โต๊ะเล็ก (The Small Table)
- Association: Football Association of Thailand
- Confederation: AFC (Asia)
- Head coach: Rakphol Sainetngam
- Captain: Kritsada Wongkaeo
- Most caps: Anucha Munjarern (117)
- Top scorer: Suphawut Thueanklang (173)
- Home stadium: Bangkok Arena
- FIFA code: THA
- FIFA ranking: 11 (24 September 2026)
- Highest FIFA ranking: 9 (May 2024)
- Lowest FIFA ranking: 11 (November 2024 – April 2025)
Home colours	Away colours	Third colours

First international
- Thailand 5–12 China (Hong Kong; 2 May 1992)

Biggest win
- Thailand 29–1 Bhutan (Incheon, South Korea; 26 June 2013)

Biggest defeat
- Brazil 11–0 Thailand (Rio Grande do Sul, Brazil; 24 October 2004)

FIFA World Cup
- Appearances: 7 (First in 2000)
- Best result: Round of 16 (2012, 2016, 2021, 2024)

AFC Futsal Championship
- Appearances: 17 (First in 1999)
- Best result: (silver) Runners-up (2008, 2012, 2024)

AFF Futsal Championship
- Appearances: 17 (First in 2001)
- Best result: (gold) Champions (2001, 2003, 2005, 2006, 2007, 2008, 2009, 2012, 2013, 2014, 2015, 2016, 2017, 2018, 2019, 2022)

The Thailand national futsal team represents Thailand in international futsal competitions and is controlled by the Football Association of Thailand.

== History ==
The Thailand national futsal team is regarded as one of the finest teams in the Asian Football Confederation and the most dominant team in Southeast Asia due to its high-profile records in the continental competitions. Thailand has played more than 250 official games against other national teams since their first international match in 1992. The national team reached its highest ranking in the Futsal World Rankings at ninth place on 9 July 2009.

Thailand started to form their national team in 1992 to attend the 1992 FIFA Futsal World Championship qualification tournament in Hong Kong. Thailand played their first international match ever against China which the Thais lost by 5–12 on 2 May 1992. Thailand lost 4–5 to Japan and ended their first qualification the next day.

After the 1992 World Championship qualification, Thailand's national Futsal team was disbanded for 7 years without any activity. The national team was then reformed again to compete in the 1999 AFC Futsal Championship, the first edition of the AFC Futsal Championship. Thailand finished their first ever Asian tournament in the group stage.

In 2000, Thailand hosted the 2000 AFC Futsal Championship in Bangkok. The tournament has become the big leap of Thailand in Asian Futsal. In this tournament, Thailand was drawn in group B with Singapore and 2 strong teams of South Korea and Kazakhstan. After losing to Kazakhstan in the opening match, the Thais got the surprising wins over South Korea and Singapore. Thailand reached the semi-final of the tournament and got beaten by eventual champions Iran. However, Thailand overcame Japan, one of the strongest teams in Asia, with an 8–6 result in the third-place playoff match. This wonder winning granted them their first ever achievement in the international futsal stage plus the right to play in the 2000 FIFA Futsal World Championship in Guatemala. After this tournament, Thailand has begun to gain the massive growth, become one of the best Asian teams and qualified for 7 consecutive World Cups since 2000.

=== World Cup ===
Thailand has attended 7 out of 10 FIFA Futsal World Cups. Their first ever participation was in 2000 at Guatemala and the latest was in 2016 at Colombia. Thailand never miss the World Championship after their debut in 2000, attended 5 consecutive editions included 2012 FIFA Futsal World Cup at Bangkok, Thailand.

==== Guatemala 2000 ====
"The debutant."

Thailand qualified for the 2000 FIFA Futsal World Championship by finishing as the third placed team at the 2000 AFC Futsal Championship. At the time, Thailand national had the lack of talent pool in futsal. Many members of the squad were the football players from Association football such as Therdsak Chaiman, Nirut Surasiang, Anucha Munjarern, Vilard Normcharoen and more. Thailand was placed in the same group with the Netherlands, Egypt, and Uruguay. Thailand was eliminated from the group stage without a single win.

==== Taiwan 2004 ====
"First win."

In 2004 at Taiwan, Thailand achieved their first win in the World Cup. After losing to Uruguay and Brazil respectively in the first two games of the group stage, Thailand manage to win 3–2 over Australia. Despite the first 3 points, Thailand was once again eliminated from the group stage.

==== Thailand 2012 ====
"The host and knock-out stage."

Thailand successfully beat the bids from China, Iran, Azerbaijan, Czech Republic, Sri Lanka and Guatemala to become the host of the 2012 FIFA Futsal World Cup. Under the coaching of Dutch Victor Hermans, Thailand made the impressive start by beating Costa Rica 3–1 in their first match in front of 4,379 crowds at Indoor Stadium Huamark. Thailand lost to Ukraine and Paraguay with the impressive performance in the group stage. Despite that, Thailand still qualified for the round of 16 for the first time in their history after finishing as one of the best third-place team across all of the group. Thailand played two-time world champion Spain and got knocked out from the competition after losing to them by 1–7. Thai 23-year-old Pivot, Suphawut Thueanklang won Goal of the Tournament award for his mark against Costa Rica.

==== Colombia 2016 ====
"Six points and goal fest."

Thailand under Victor Hermans qualified for the 2016 FIFA Futsal World Cup in Colombia after finishing as the third placed team in the 2016 AFC Futsal Championship. The Dutch coach left the team before the tournament and Football Association of Thailand appointed Miguel Rodrigo as the national trainer.

Thailand was placed in Group B along with Russia, Egypt and Cuba. At the first game, Thailand played against the third placed team in the World Rankings and UEFA Futsal Euro 2016 runner-up, Russia, and lost by 4–6 with an impressive performance. Thailand later won other two games in the group stage against Cuba and Egypt and then qualified for round of 16 as the runner-up of Group B. This is the first time in the history that Thailand could collect more than 3 points in the group stage. In the round of 16, Thailand lost to Azerbaijan with an 8–13 result in the extra-time after a 7–7 draw in 40 minutes.

In the 2016 edition, Thailand scored 22 goals from 4 games, almost matching the total record of the previous 4 editions of 23 goals from 14 games. Suphawut Thueanklang is the team highest scorer with six goals, followed by Jirawat Sornwichian (five goals).

== Team image ==
=== Nicknames ===
Thailand national futsal team was dubbed by the media and supporters as "Toh-Lek" (Thai: โต๊ะเล็ก lit. small table).

Toh-Lek or The Small Table is a slang term to call futsal in Thailand, as the sport is played on a small, indoor field, instead of its official word (Thai: ฟุตซอล). As a coincidence, The Small Table became the nickname of Thailand's futsal team to this day.

=== Home stadium ===
Thailand plays the home games at the Bangkok Futsal Arena with a capacity of 12,000 spectators, the Indoor Stadium Huamark with a capacity of 10,000 spectators and the Nonthaburi Sports Complex Gymnasium with a capacity of 4,000 spectators.

Nong Chok	Bangkok Metropolis	Bang Kapi
Bangkok Arena	Bangkok Metropolis	Indoor Stadium Huamark
Capacity: 12,000	Bangkok Metropolis	Capacity: 10,000
	Thailand national futsal team (Bangkok)	

== Results and fixtures ==
Recent results within last 12 months and upcoming fixtures.

Legend

Win Draw Loss Fixture

=== 2025 ===
15 December 2025 2025 SEA Games	Thailand	7–1	Malaysia	Nonthaburi, Thailand
19:00 UTC+7:00	Worasak 1'; Chaowala 7'; Muhammad 8', 20', 37'; Atippong 38'; Ronnachai 38'		Awalluddin 12'	Stadium: Nonthaburi Stadium

16 December 2025 2025 SEA Games	Myanmar	0–3	Thailand	Nonthaburi, Thailand
19:00 UTC+7:00			Itticha 14'; Sarawut 22'; Atippong 23'	Stadium: Nonthaburi Stadium

18 December 2025 2025 SEA Games	Vietnam	1–2	Thailand	Nonthaburi, Thailand
19:00 UTC+7:00	Nguyễn Đa Hải 30'		Muhammad 15'; Itticha 29'	Stadium: Nonthaburi Stadium

19 December 2025 2025 SEA Games	Thailand	1-6	Indonesia	Nonthaburi, Thailand
19:00 UTC+7:00				Stadium: Nonthaburi Stadium

=== 2026 ===
27 January 2026 2026 AFC Futsal Asian Cup	Thailand	2–0	Lebanon	Jakarta, Indonesia
13:00 UTC+7:00	Worasak 27'; Muhammad 34'	Report		Stadium: Jakarta International Velodrome; Referee: Anatoliy Rubakov (Uzbekistan), Sattorov Sukhrob (Tajikistan)

29 January 2026 2026 AFC Futsal Asian Cup	Kuwait	1–6	Thailand	Jakarta, Indonesia
17:00 UTC+7:00	Narongsak 30' (o.g.)	Report	Muhammad 16', 18', 22', 31'; Sarawut 25'; Itticha 36'	Stadium: Jakarta International Velodrome; Referee: Oya Tsubasa (Japan), Andrew Best (Australia)

31 January 2026 2026 AFC Futsal Asian Cup	Thailand	1–0	Vietnam	Jakarta, Indonesia
15:00 UTC+7:00	Krit 36'	Report		Stadium: Indonesia Arena; Referee: Fahad Al-Hosani (United Arab Emirates), Majid Al-Hatmi (Oman)

3 February 2026 2026 AFC Futsal Asian Cup QF	Thailand	2–4	Iraq	Jakarta, Indonesia
15:00 UTC+7:00	Muhammad 9'; Chaowala 40'	Report	Al-Bayati 8', 22'; Al-Darraji 33'; Al-Bustani 37'	Stadium: Indonesia Arena; Referee: Sukhrob Sattorov (Tajikistan), Abdulrahman Al-Doseri (Bahrain)

6 April 2026 2026 ASEAN Futsal Championship	Thailand	4–1	Timor-Leste	Nonthaburi, Thailand
20:00 UTC+7:00	Muhammad 6', 12'; Charoondej 17'; Narongsak 37'	Report	Bendito 33'	Stadium: Nonthaburi Sports Complex Gymnasium; Referee: Yahya Alathwani (Saudi Arabia)

7 April 2026 2026 ASEAN Futsal Championship	Myanmar	0–2	Thailand	Nonthaburi, Thailand
20:00 UTC+7:00		Report	Muhammad 2'; Sarawut 33'	Stadium: Nonthaburi Sports Complex Gymnasium; Referee: Muhamad Faiz Bin Jamaluddin (Malaysia)

8 April 2026 2026 ASEAN Futsal Championship	Thailand	4–2	Vietnam	Nonthaburi, Thailand
20:00 UTC+7:00	Itticha 16'; Sarawut 20'; Mintada 23'; Vũ Ngọc Ánh 40' (o.g.)		Từ Minh Quang 23'; Nguyễn Đa Hải 35'	Stadium: Nonthaburi Sports Complex Gymnasium; Referee: Kim Tae-wan (South Korea)

10 April 2026 2026 ASEAN Futsal Championship Semi-final	Thailand	4–3	Australia	Nonthaburi, Thailand
20:00 UTC+7:00	Itticha 9'; Muhammad 30'; Mintada 31'; Sarawut 35'	Report	Harb 10', 32'; De Melo 38'	Stadium: Nonthaburi Sports Complex Gymnasium; Referee: Ismail Msawed Yahya (Kuwait)

12 April 2026 2026 ASEAN Futsal Championship Final	Indonesia	1–2	Thailand	Nonthaburi, Thailand
20:00 UTC+7:00	Putra 16'	Report	Itticha 20'; Panat 31'	Stadium: Nonthaburi Sports Complex Gymnasium

1 August 2026 2026 Continental Futsal Championship	New Zealand	0–6	Thailand	Nonthaburi, Thailand
20:30 UTC+7:00			Adinan 11'; Worasak 12'; Itticha 18'; Narongsak 22'; Chaowala 24'; Panat 37'	Stadium: Nonthaburi Sports Complex Gymnasium

2 August 2026 2026 Continental Futsal Championship	Thailand	6–1	Afghanistan	Nonthaburi, Thailand
20:30 UTC+7:00	Sarawut 14'; Chaowala 27', 38'; Worasak 32'; Panat 37'; Mintada 39'		Moradi 34'	Stadium: Nonthaburi Sports Complex Gymnasium

5 August 2026 2026 Continental Futsal Championship	Vietnam	3–3	Thailand	Nonthaburi, Thailand
20:30 UTC+7:00	Châu Đoàn Phát 31'; Từ Minh Quang 34'; Nguyễn Đa Hải 38'		Therdsak 2'; Panut 7', 14'	Stadium: Nonthaburi Sports Complex Gymnasium

6 August 2026 2026 Continental Futsal Championship	Thailand	1–7	Russia	Nonthaburi, Thailand
20:30 UTC+7:00	Panat 17'		Moskalev 2', 15'; Ponkratov 19', 28'; Antoshkin 22'; Valeev 39'; Pirogov 40'	Stadium: Nonthaburi Sports Complex Gymnasium

== Coaching staff ==
=== Coaches history ===
	Nationality	Name	Period	Ref.
1	Thailand	Bongkarn Prompui	1999–2000	
2	Brazil	Silvalho	2000–2001	
3	Argentina	Vicente De Luise	2003	
4	Brazil	Gelacio de Castro	2004–2006	
5	Thailand	Pattaya Piamkum	2007	
6	Spain	Pulpis	2008–2011	
7	Netherlands	Victor Hermans	2012–2016	
8	Spain	Miguel Rodrigo	2016–2017	
9	Spain	Pulpis	2017–2021	
10	Thailand	Rakphol Sainetngam	2021–2022	
11	Spain	Carlos César Núñez Gago	2022–2023	
12	Spain	Eloy Alonso (Interim)	2023–2024	
13	Spain	José Lucas Mena	2024	
14	Spain	Miguel Rodrigo	2024–2025	
15	Thailand	Rakphol Sainetngram	2026–present	

== Team ==
=== Current squad ===
The following 14 players are called for 2024 FIFA Futsal World Cup in Uzbekistan between 14 September – 6 October 2024.

No.	Pos.	Player	Date of birth (age)	Club
1	GK	Arut Senbat	26 November 1988 (aged 35)	(Football Association of Thailand) Black Pearl United
2	DF	Narongsak Wingwon	18 February 1998 (aged 26)	(Football Association of Thailand) Hongyen Thakam
3	MF	Alongkorn Janphon	16 September 1994 (aged 29)	(Football Association of Thailand) Port
4	FW	Krit Aransanyalak	27 March 2001 (aged 23)	(Football Association of Thailand) Free Agent
5	DF	Itticha Praphaphan	31 December 1991 (aged 32)	(Football Association of Thailand) Port
6	DF	Jirawat Sornwichian	23 September 1988 (aged 35)	(Football Association of Thailand) Thammasat Stallion
7	MF	Kritsada Wongkaeo (captain)	29 April 1988 (aged 36)	(Football Association of Thailand) Chonburi Bluewave
8	FW	Worasak Srirangpirot	26 December 1992 (aged 31)	(Football Association of Thailand) Hongyen Thakam
9	FW	Suphawut Thueanklang	14 July 1989 (aged 35)	(Football Association of Thailand) Chonburi Bluewave
10	MF	Sarawut Phalaphruek	9 June 1997 (aged 27)	(Football Association of Thailand) Free Agent
11	MF	Muhammad Osamanmusa	19 January 1998 (aged 26)	(Royal Spanish Football Federation) Jimbee Cartagena
12	GK	Katawut Hankampa	27 May 1992 (aged 32)	(Football Association of Thailand) Thammasat Stallion
13	MF	Ronnachai Jungwongsuk	4 March 1997 (aged 27)	(Football Association of Thailand) Chonburi Bluewave
14	MF	Apiwat Chaemcharoen	31 March 1991 (aged 33)	(Football Association of Thailand) Chonburi Bluewave

=== Previous squads ===
FIFA Futsal World Cup

- 2000 FIFA Futsal World Cup squads
- 2004 FIFA Futsal World Cup squads
- 2008 FIFA Futsal World Cup squads
- 2012 FIFA Futsal World Cup squads
- 2016 FIFA Futsal World Cup squads
- 2021 FIFA Futsal World Cup squads
- 2024 FIFA Futsal World Cup squads

AFC Futsal Asian Cup

- 2018 AFC Futsal Championship squads
- 2022 AFC Futsal Asian Cup squads
- 2024 AFC Futsal Asian Cup squads

=== Notable players ===
- Therdsak Chaiman (1999–2005)
- Anucha Munjarern (2000–2008)

== Records ==
=== Most appearances ===
- Still active national team players are highlighted

Most capped players record
#	Player	Caps	Position	Career
1	Anucha Munjarern	117	FW	1993–2007
2	Pattaya Piamkum	104	MF	1996–2004
3	Somkid Chuenta	97	GK	2001–2009
4	Suphawut Thueanklang	89	FW	2008–Present
5	Kritsada Wongkaeo	77	MF	2009–Present
Last updated was against Indonesia on 27 October 2019

=== Top goalscorers ===
- Still active national team players are highlighted

Top scorers record
#	Player	Goals	Caps	Career	Ratio
1	Suphawut Thueanklang	184	89	2007–Present	2.08
2	Anucha Munjarern	109	117	2000–2008	0.93
3	Kritsada Wongkaeo	95	76	2009–Present	1.25
4	Jetsada Chudech	81	57	2007–Present	1.42
5	Pattaya Piamkum	79	104	1996–2004	0.76
Last updated was against Indonesia on 27 October 2019

== Competitive record ==
*Denotes draws includes knockout matches decided on penalty shootouts. Red border indicates that the tournament was hosted on home soil. Gold, silver, bronze backgrounds indicates 1st, 2nd and 3rd finishes respectively. Bold text indicates best finish in tournament.

=== FIFA Futsal World Cup ===
FIFA Futsal World Cup record
Year	Round	M	W	D	L	GF	GA
(Netherlands) 1989	Did not enter						
(Hong Kong) 1992	Did not qualify						
(Spain) 1996	Did not enter						
(Guatemala) 2000	Group stage	3	0	0	3	2	17
(Taiwan) 2004	Group stage	3	1	0	2	5	13
(Brazil) 2008	Group stage	4	1	0	3	7	15
(Thailand) 2012	**Round of 16**	4	1	0	3	9	16
(Colombia) 2016	**Round of 16**	4	2	0	2	22	25
(Lithuania) 2021	**Round of 16**	4	1	1	2	11	16
(Uzbekistan) 2024	**Round of 16**	4	2	0	2	15	20
**Total:7/11**	Round of 16	26	8	1	17	71	122

=== AFC Futsal Asian Cup ===
AFC Futsal Asian Cup record									Qualification record							
Year	Round	M	W	D	L	GF	GA	GD	M	W	D	L	GF	GA	GD	Link
(Malaysia) 1999	Group stage	4	2	0	2	43	22	+21	No qualification							
(Thailand) 2000	**Third place**	**5**	**3**	**0**	**2**	**29**	**23**	**+6**	No qualification							
(Iran) 2001	Quarter-finals	4	2	0	2	24	14	+10	No qualification							
(Indonesia) 2002	**Third place**	**7**	**6**	**0**	**1**	**42**	**15**	**+17**	No qualification							
(Iran) 2003	**Third place**	**6**	**5**	**0**	**1**	**23**	**7**	**+16**	No qualification							
(Macau) 2004	**Third place**	**6**	**4**	**1**	**1**	**49**	**14**	**+35**	No qualification							
(Vietnam) 2005	Second round	6	3	2	1	57	12	+45	No qualification							
(Uzbekistan) 2006	Group stage	3	2	0	1	19	11	+8	Automatically qualified							Link
(Japan) 2007	Quarter-finals	4	2	0	2	23	16	+7	Automatically qualified							Link
(Thailand) 2008	**Runners-up**	**6**	**5**	**0**	**1**	**27**	**10**	**+17**	Qualified as host							Link
(Uzbekistan) 2010	Quarter-finals	4	3	0	1	21	16	+5	Automatically qualified							Link
(United Arab Emirates) 2012	**Runners-up**	**6**	**5**	**0**	**1**	**22**	**16**	**+6**	5	5	0	0	45	5	+40	Link
(Vietnam) 2014	Quarter-finals	4	2	1	1	17	9	+12	2013 AFF Futsal Championship							Link
(Uzbekistan) 2016	**Third place**	**6**	**5**	**1**	**0**	**31**	**10**	**+21**	2015 AFF Futsal Championship							Link
(Taiwan) 2018	Quarter-finals	4	2	0	2	16	16	0	2017 AFF Futsal Championship							Link
(Turkmenistan) 2020	Cancelled due to COVID-19 pandemic								2019 AFF Futsal Championship							Link
(Kuwait) 2022	**Fourth place**	**6**	**3**	**1**	**2**	**16**	**20**	**-4**	2022 AFF Futsal Championship							Link
(Thailand) 2024	**Runners-up**	**6**	**4**	**1**	**1**	**17**	**11**	**+6**	2	2	0	0	11	1	+10	Link
(Indonesia) 2026	Quarter-finals	4	3	0	1	11	5	+6	3	2	1	0	21	3	+18	Link
**Total:18/18**	Runners-up	91	61	7	23	487	247	+240	10	9	1	0	77	9	+68	–

- In 2024 **Qualified as host** but was played in 2 matches.

=== Asian Indoor and Martial Arts Games ===
Asian Indoor and Martial Arts Games record
Year	Round	M	W	D	L	GF	GA
(Thailand) 2005	**Runners-up**	4	3	0	1	24	6
(Macau) 2007	**Runners-up**	6	5	0	1	48	14
(Vietnam) 2009	**Runners-up**	5	4	1	0	23	12
(South Korea) 2013	Third place	5	4	0	1	53	16
(Turkmenistan) 2017	Quarterfinals	3	1	0	2	13	18
(Saudi Arabia) 2026	TBD						
**Total**	5/5	23	17	1	5	161	66

=== ASEAN Futsal Championship ===
ASEAN Futsal Championship record
Year	Round	M	W	D	L	GF	GA
(Malaysia) 2001	**Champions**	5	5	0	0	62	5
(Malaysia) 2003	**Champions**	6	6	0	0	53	11
(Thailand) 2005	**Champions**	6	6	0	0	47	4
(Thailand) 2006	**Champions**	4	4	0	0	59	7
(Thailand) 2007	**Champions**	5	5	0	0	57	7
(Thailand) 2008^{[1]}	**Champions**	5	4	0	1	22	10
(Vietnam) 2009	**Champions**	5	5	0	0	38	14
(Vietnam) 2010^{[2]}	did not enter						
(Thailand) 2012	**Champions**	6	6	0	0	94	9
(Thailand) 2013	**Champions**	6	6	0	0	48	9
(Malaysia) 2014	**Champions**	6	5	0	1	39	8
(Thailand) 2015	**Champions**	6	6	0	0	53	8
(Thailand) 2016	**Champions**	4	4	0	0	41	8
(Vietnam) 2017	**Champions**	5	5	0	0	49	11
(Indonesia) 2018	**Champions**	5	5	0	0	42	5
(Vietnam) 2019	**Champions**	5	5	0	0	40	1
(Thailand) 2020	Cancelled						
(Thailand) 2021	Cancelled						
(Thailand) 2022	**Champions**	6	4	2	0	40	7
(Thailand) 2024	Third place	6	4	0	2	30	10
(Thailand) 2026	**Champions**	5	5	0	0	16	7
**Total**	18/21	96	90	2	4	779	151

^{1}In 2008 edition, Thailand used a U-21 squad to participate in the tournament.
^{2}In 2010 edition, Thailand withdrew from the competition to organize 2010 Thailand Five's at Udon Thani, Thailand in the same period.

=== Southeast Asian Games ===
Southeast Asian Games record
Year	Round	M	W	D	L	GF	GA	GD
(Thailand) 2007	**Champions**	5	5	0	0	50	6	+44
(Laos) 2009	No competition as not officially selected by host							
(Indonesia) 2011	**Champions**	4	4	0	0	42	8	+34
(Myanmar) 2013	**Champions**	4	4	0	0	32	5	+27
(Singapore) 2015	No competition as not officially selected by host							
(Malaysia) 2017	**Champions**	4	3	0	1	20	10	+10
(Philippines) 2019	No competition as not officially selected by host							
(Vietnam) 2021	**Champions**	4	3	1	0	11	4	+7
(Cambodia) 2023	No competition as not officially selected by host							
(Thailand) 2025	**Runners-up**	4	3	0	1	13	8	+5
**Total**	6/6	25	22	1	2	168	41	+127

=== Thailand Friendly Cup ===
Year	Rank	M	W	D	L	GF	GA	Ref
(Thailand) 2003	-	0	0	0	0	0	0	
(Thailand) 2004	-	0	0	0	0	0	0	
(Thailand) 2008	2nd	3	2	1	0	12	5	
(Thailand) 2010	-	0	0	0	0	0	0	
(Thailand) 2016	-	0	0	0	0	0	0	
(Thailand) 2017	-	0	0	0	0	0	0	
(Thailand) 2018	-	0	0	0	0	0	0	
(Thailand) 2019	-	0	0	0	0	0	0	
(Thailand) 2020-1	-	0	0	0	0	0	0	
(Thailand) 2020-2	-	0	0	0	0	0	0	
(Thailand) 2021	-	0	0	0	0	0	0	
(Thailand) 2022-1	-	0	0	0	0	0	0	
(Thailand) 2022-1	-	0	0	0	0	0	0	
(Thailand) 2023-1	-	0	0	0	0	0	0	
(Thailand) 2023-2	-	0	0	0	0	0	0	
**Total**	15/15	0	0	0	0	0	0	-

== World ranking ==
There is currently official FIFA futsal world ranking.
As of 29 August 2025, the top 10 AFC teams are:

AFF	AFC	FIFA	Nation	Points
	1	5	Iran	1485.1
1	2	11	Thailand	1324.77
	3	13	Japan	1267.21
	4	19	Uzbekistan	1201.34
2	5	23	Indonesia	1189.46
3	6	26	Vietnam	1171.02
	7	33	Afghanistan	1130.02
	8	41	Iraq	1091.27
	9	43	Kuwait	1085.51
	10	46	Tajikistan	1066.37

As of September 2025

== Head-to-head record ==
The record of Thailand against other countries since the first official international match against China on 2 May 1992. Only official games were regarded.

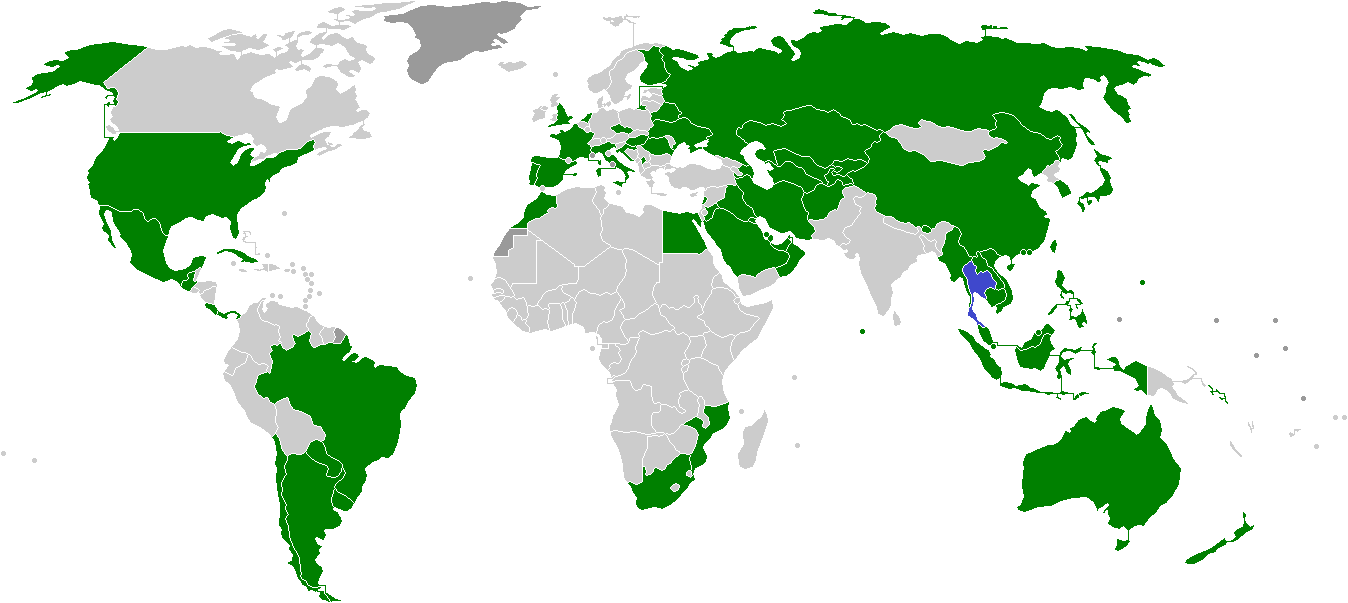
Thailand national futsal team opponents.

As of matches played on 6 August 2026

Opponents	Conf.	Played	Won	Drawn	Lost	GF	GA	GD
Afghanistan	AFC	5	5	0	0	39	7	+32
Argentina	CONMEBOL	5	1	1	3	10	15	-5
Australia	AFC	18	15	0	3	86	35	+51
Azerbaijan	UEFA	1	0	0	1	8	13	-5
Bahrain	AFC	3	3	0	0	23	4	+19
Belarus	UEFA	1	1	0	0	3	1	+2
Bhutan	AFC	1	1	0	0	29	1	+28
Brazil	CONMEBOL	8	0	0	8	6	61	-55
Brunei	AFC	14	14	0	0	189	13	+176
Cambodia	AFC	4	4	0	0	60	5	+55
Chile	CONMEBOL	1	1	0	0	6	1	+5
China	AFC	12	6	4	2	39	35	+4
Chinese Taipei	AFC	4	4	0	0	23	6	+17
Costa Rica	CONCACAF	2	1	0	1	4	3	+1
Croatia	UEFA	1	1	0	0	2	1	+1
Cuba	CONCACAF	2	2	0	0	18	10	+8
Czech Republic	UEFA	2	0	0	2	6	8	-2
Egypt	CAF	6	3	1	2	13	22	-9
England	UEFA	2	2	0	0	10	1	+9
Finland	UEFA	1	0	1	0	2	2	0
France	UEFA	1	0	0	1	2	5	-3
Guam	AFC	1	1	0	0	21	0	+21
Guatemala	CONCACAF	3	2	0	1	13	9	+4
Hong Kong	AFC	1	1	0	0	6	0	+6
Hungary	UEFA	1	0	1	0	4	4	0
Indonesia	AFC	24	16	3	5	103	53	+50
Iran	AFC	30	6	3	21	61	140	-79
Iraq	AFC	11	10	0	1	46	19	+27
Italy	UEFA	2	0	0	2	3	8	-5
Japan	AFC	25	7	2	16	55	78	-23
Jordan	AFC	2	2	0	0	14	1	+13
Kazakhstan	UEFA^{[1]}	4	0	1	3	7	16	-9
Kosovo	UEFA	1	0	1	0	6	6	0
Kuwait	AFC	14	11	1	2	67	28	+39
Kyrgyzstan	AFC	8	7	0	1	46	19	+27
Laos	AFC	7	7	0	0	98	9	+89
Lebanon	AFC	7	5	1	1	33	19	+14
Macau	AFC	3	3	0	0	32	7	+25
Malaysia	AFC	36	36	0	0	216	50	+166
Maldives	AFC	2	2	0	0	33	3	+30
Mexico	CONCACAF	1	1	0	0	7	0	+7
Morocco	CAF	3	0	2	1	4	8	-4
Mozambique	CAF	4	4	0	0	21	10	+11
Myanmar	AFC	23	23	0	0	189	41	+148
Netherlands	UEFA	3	0	1	2	5	12	-7
New Zealand	OFC	3	3	0	0	24	0	+24
Oman	AFC	4	3	1	0	25	2	+23
Panama	CONCACAF	1	0	0	1	5	7	-2
Paraguay	CONMEBOL	2	0	0	2	2	11	-9
Philippines	AFC	9	9	0	0	114	13	+101
Portugal	UEFA	5	0	1	4	6	14	-8
Qatar	AFC	1	1	0	0	4	3	+1
Romania	UEFA	3	2	0	1	17	11	+6
Russia	UEFA	5	0	0	5	10	24	-14
Saudi Arabia	AFC	2	2	0	0	5	2	+3
Singapore	AFC	6	6	0	0	72	4	+68
Solomon Islands	OFC	3	2	0	1	22	9	+13
South Africa	CAF	1	1	0	0	6	2	+4
South Korea	AFC	8	6	1	1	48	23	+25
Spain	UEFA	7	0	0	7	6	47	-41
Tajikistan	AFC	5	4	1	0	19	11	+8
Timor-Leste	AFC	8	8	0	0	100	10	+90
Turkmenistan	AFC	4	3	0	1	36	5	+31
Ukraine	UEFA	1	0	0	1	3	5	-2
United Arab Emirates	AFC	3	3	0	0	13	4	+9
United States	CONCACAF	1	1	0	0	5	3	+2
Uruguay	CONMEBOL	1	0	0	1	1	4	-3
Uzbekistan	AFC	12	8	1	3	36	27	+9
Vietnam	AFC	28	25	1	2	138	37	+101
69 Countries		433	294	29	109	2385	1067	+1318

^{1} Kazakhstan was still the member of the Asian Football Confederation (AFC) when Thailand played them for the first time in the 2000 AFC Futsal Championship at Bangkok, Thailand.

== See also ==
- Thailand Futsal League
