= Uzbekistan national futsal team =

Uzbekistan
- Nickname(s): Oq Boʻrilar/Oқ бўpилap (The White Wolves)
- Association: Uzbekistan Football Federation
- Confederation: AFC (Asia)
- Head coach: Jose Venancio Lopez
- FIFA code: UZB
- FIFA ranking: 24 ▼1 (24 September 2026)
Home colours	Away colours

First international
- Kazakhstan 3–2 Uzbekistan (Kuala Lumpur, Malaysia, 5 March 1999)

Biggest win
- Uzbekistan 15–0 Qatar (Bangkok, Thailand; 12 November 2005)

Biggest defeat
- Brazil 13–0 Uzbekistan (Lages, Brazil, 18 October 2007)

FIFA World Cup
- Appearances: 3 (First in 2016)
- Best result: Round of 16 (2021)

AFC Futsal Championship
- Appearances: 15 (First in 1999)
- Best result: (silver) Runners-up (2001, 2006, 2010, 2016)

Asian Indoor and Martial Arts Games
- Appearances: 5 (First in 2005)
- Best result: (silver) Runners-up (2017)

Grand Prix de Futsal
- Appearances: 1 (First in 2007)
- Best result: 9th place (2007)

The Uzbekistan national futsal team is controlled by the Uzbekistan Football Federation, the governing body for futsal in Uzbekistan and represents the country in international futsal competitions, such as the World Cup and the AFC Futsal Championship.

Uzbekistan hosted the 2024 FIFA Futsal World Cup marking the first time that Uzbekistan has ever hosted a FIFA tournament.

== Coaching staff ==
=== Current coaching staff ===
As of 7 September 2021

Role	Name
Head coach	(Uzbekistan) Bakhodir Akhmedov
Assistant coach	(Uzbekistan) Nodir Elibaev
Goalkeeping coach	(Spain) Karlos Corona Suarez
Physical coach	(Spain) Arcaitez Sisniega Gomez

== Results and fixtures ==
The following is a list of match results in the last 12 months, as well as any future matches that have been scheduled.

Legend

Win Draw Lose Fixture

=== 2026 ===
28 January 2026 2026 AFC Futsal Asian Cup	Uzbekistan	0–0	Tajikistan	Jakarta
19:00		Report		Stadium: Indonesia Arena; Referee: Ebrahim Mehrabiafshar (Iran), Yahya Al-Athwani (Saudi Arabia)

30 January 2026 2026 AFC Futsal Asian Cup	Australia	2–4	Uzbekistan	Jakarta
15:00	Harb 7'35"; Akhadjonov 7'47" (o.g.)	Report	Rakhmatov 8'29"; Ropiev 10'15"; Khamroev 18'29"; Akhadjonov 37'00"	Stadium: Indonesia Arena; Referee: Elias Al-Hakim (Lebanon), Abdulaziz Al-Sarraf (Kuwait)

1 February 2026 2026 AFC Futsal Asian Cup	Japan	2–1	Uzbekistan	Jakarta
15:00	Yamanaka 29'14", 36'30"	Report	Fakhriddinov 6'30"	Stadium: Indonesia Arena; Referee: Trương Quốc Dũng (Vietnam), Pornnarong Grairod (Thailand)

3 February 2026 2026 AFC Futsal Asian Cup knockout stage	Iran	7–4	Uzbekistan	Jakarta
13:00	Oladghobad 6'19"; Ahmadabbasi 8'22"; Derakhshani 11'24"; Sabzi 17'01", 39'40"; Tayebi 23'12" (pen.); Azimi 30'52"	Report	Ropiev 0'38" (pen.); Tulkinov 4'55"; Juraev 25'08"; Akhadjonov 31'59"	Stadium: Jakarta International Velodrome; Referee: Wahyu Wicaksono (Indonesia), Trương Quốc Dũng (Vietnam)

== Team ==
=== Current squad ===
Players who were called to compete in the 2020 FIFA Futsal World Cup for Uzbekistan.

No.	Pos.	Player	Date of birth (age)	Caps	Club
1	GK	Rustam Umarov (captain)	26 May 1984 (aged 37)		(Uzbekistan) Almalyk MFK
2	DF	Anaskhon Rakhmatov	20 June 1994 (aged 27)		(Uzbekistan) Almalyk MFK
3	DF	Mashrab Adilov	15 August 1994 (aged 27)		(Uzbekistan) Pakhtakor Tashkent FK
4	FW	Ikhtiyor Ropiev	19 September 1993 (aged 27)		(Uzbekistan) Almalyk MFK
5	FW	Muzaffar Akhadjonov	8 November 1997 (aged 23)		(Uzbekistan) Almalyk MFK
6	DF	Ilkhomjon Khamroev	25 September 1997 (aged 23)		(Uzbekistan) Almalyk MFK
7	MF	Dilshod Rakhmatov	4 December 1989 (aged 31)		(Uzbekistan) Jizzakh Khuasin
8	MF	Khusniddin Nishonov	19 May 1998 (aged 23)		(Uzbekistan) Almalyk MFK
9	FW	Elbek Tulkinov	24 December 2000 (aged 20)		(Uzbekistan) Maxam Chirchik
10	FW	Davron Choriev	1 January 1993 (aged 28)		(Uzbekistan) Almalyk MFK
11	FW	Akbar Usmonov	9 March 1997 (aged 24)		(Uzbekistan) Pakhtakor Tashkent FK
12	GK	Ravshan Elibaev	26 January 1987 (aged 34)		(Uzbekistan) Pakhtakor Tashkent FK
13	DF	Shakhzodjon Sadiev	21 September 2000 (aged 20)		(Uzbekistan) Almalyk MFK
14	DF	Khushnur Erkinov	7 May 1998 (aged 23)		(Uzbekistan) PFK Metallurg Bekabad
15	MF	Sunatulla Juraev	24 December 1994 (aged 26)		(Uzbekistan) Pakhtakor Tashkent FK
21	GK	Abbos Elmurodov	4 September 1998 (aged 23)		(Uzbekistan) Jizzakh Khuasin

=== Previous squads ===
FIFA Futsal World Cup

- 2016 FIFA Futsal World Cup squads

AFC Futsal Championship

- 2018 AFC Futsal Championship squads

== Competitive record ==
=== Summary ===
Event	Gold	Silver	Bronze	Total
AFC Futsal Asian Cup	0	4	6	10
Asian Indoor Games	0	1	3	4
Total	0	5	9	14

=== FIFA Futsal World Cup ===
FIFA Futsal World Cup record
Year	Round	Pld	W	D	L	GF	GA
(Netherlands) 1989	Part of Soviet Union						
(Hong Kong) 1992	did not enter						
(Spain) 1996	did not enter						
(Guatemala) 2000	did not qualify						
(Taiwan) 2004	did not qualify						
(Brazil) 2008	did not qualify						
(Thailand) 2012	did not qualify						
(Colombia) 2016	Group Stage	3	0	1	2	5	11
(Lithuania) 2021	Round of 16	4	1	0	3	16	19
(Uzbekistan) 2024	Group Stage	3	0	1	2	7	12
Total	3/10	10	1	2	7	28	42

=== AFC Futsal Asian Cup ===
AFC Futsal Asian Cup									Qualification							
Year	Round	M	W	D	L	GF	GA	GD	M	W	D	L	GF	GA	GD	Link
(Malaysia) 1999	Group Stage	3	1	1	1	18	12	+6	No qualification							
(Thailand) 2000	Group Stage	4	2	0	2	26	17	+9	No qualification							
(Iran) 2001	Runners-up	7	5	1	1	30	22	+8	No qualification							
(Indonesia) 2002	Quarter-finals	4	2	0	2	12	8	+4	No qualification							
(Iran) 2003	Quarter-finals	4	2	0	2	12	12	0	No qualification							
(Macau) 2004	Fourth Place	7	4	0	3	29	17	+12	No qualification							
(Vietnam) 2005	Third Place	7	6	0	1	47	12	+35	No qualification							
(Uzbekistan) 2006	Runners-up	5	4	0	1	22	8	+14	Qualified as host							Link
(Japan) 2007	Third Place	6	4	0	2	19	20	−1	Automatically qualified							Link
(Thailand) 2008	Quarter-finals	4	3	0	1	20	8	+12	Automatically qualified							Link
(Uzbekistan) 2010	Runners-up	6	5	0	1	23	18	+5	Qualified as host							Link
(United Arab Emirates) 2012	Quarter-finals	4	2	1	1	15	9	+6	Automatically qualified							Link
(Vietnam) 2014	Third Place	6	4	1	1	15	16	−1	3	3	0	0	20	6	+14	Link
(Uzbekistan) 2016	Runners-up	6	4	1	1	12	7	+5	Qualified as host							Link
(Taiwan) 2018	Third Place	6	3	1	2	27	20	+7	3	3	0	0	22	6	+16	Link
(Turkmenistan) 2020	Cancelled due to COVID-19 pandemic								3	3	0	0	19	6	+13	Link
(Kuwait) 2022	Third Place	6	5	0	1	29	7	+22	3	3	0	0	15	4	+11	Link
(Thailand) 2024	Third Place	6	4	2	0	20	13	+7	3	3	0	0	13	5	+8	Link
(Indonesia) 2026	Quarter-finals	4	1	1	2	9	11	−2	3	2	0	1	16	5	+11	Link
Total:18/18	Runners-up	95	61	9	25	388	237	+151	18	17	0	1	105	32	+73	–

=== Grand Prix de Futsal ===
Grand Prix de Futsal record
Year	Round	Pld	W	D*	L	GS	GA	DIF
(Brazil) 2005	did not enter							
(Brazil) 2006	did not enter							
(Brazil) 2007	9th Place	3	1	1	1	5	6	−1
(Brazil) 2008	did not enter							
(Brazil) 2009	did not enter							
(Brazil) 2010	did not enter							
(Brazil) 2011	did not enter							
(Brazil) 2013	did not enter							
(Brazil) 2014	did not enter							
(Brazil) 2015	did not enter							
(Brazil) 2018	did not enter							
Total	1/11	3	1	1	1	5	6	−1

=== Asian Indoor and Martial Arts Games ===
Asian Indoor and Martial Arts Games record
Year	Round	Pld	W	D*	L	GS	GA	DIF
(Thailand) 2005	Third Place	5	3	0	2	25	12	+13
(Macau) 2007	Third Place	6	3	1	2	23	9	+14
(Vietnam) 2009	Third Place	5	4	0	1	16	8	+8
(South Korea) 2013	Quarterfinals	3	2	0	1	20	8	+12
(Turkmenistan) 2017	Runners-up	7	3	2	2	26	14	+12
Total	5/5	26	16	3	7	110	51	+59

=== Islamic Solidarity Games ===
Islamic Solidarity Games record
Year	Round	Rank	M	W	D	L	GF	GA	GD
(Saudi Arabia) 2025	Third Place	3rd	5	2	2	1	23	11	+12
Total	1 title	1/1	5	2	2	1	23	11	+12

== See also ==
- Uzbekistan national football team
- Uzbekistan women's national futsal team
- Uzbekistan national under-17 football team
- Uzbekistan national under-19 football team
- Uzbekistan national under-23 football team
- Sport in Uzbekistan
