= 2026 Copa América de Futsal =

CONMEBOL Copa América de Futsal Paraguay 2026

Tournament details
- Host country: Paraguay
- City: Luque
- Dates: 24 January – 1 February
- Teams: 10 (from 1 confederation)
- Venue: COP Arena – Estadio Óscar Harrison

Final positions
- Champions: Brazil (12th title)
- Runners-up: Argentina
- Third place: Peru
- Fourth place: Venezuela

Tournament statistics
- Matches played: 27
- Goals scored: 115 (4.26 per match)

The 2026 CONMEBOL Copa América de Futsal was the 15th edition of the Copa América de Futsal, the international futsal championship under FIFA rules organised by CONMEBOL for the men's national teams of South America. It was held in Luque, Paraguay from 24 January to 1 February 2026.

Brazil were the defending champions.

== Teams ==
All ten CONMEBOL member national teams entered the tournament.

Team	Appearance	Previous best top-4 performance
Argentina (holders)	15th	Champions (2003, 2015, 2022)
Bolivia	8th	Fourth place (2000)
Brazil	15th	Champions (1992, 1995, 1996, 1997, 1998, 1999, 2000, 2008, 2011, 2017, 2024)
Chile	10th	None
Colombia	9th	Fourth place (2011, 2015, 2022)
Ecuador	9th	Fourth place (1992)
Paraguay (hosts)	15th	Runners-up (1998, 1999, 2015, 2022)
Peru	9th	None
Uruguay	13th	Runners-up (1996, 2008)
Venezuela	9th	Third place (2024)

=== Squads ===
Each national team had to submit a squad of at least 10 and up to 14 players, including a minimum of two goalkeepers (Regulations Article 45). Members of each squad are listed on the CONMEBOL website.

== Venue ==
On 11 December 2025, CONMEBOL confirmed Luque, Paraguay as the host city. This is the fourth time that Paraguay host the tournament and the third consecutive time after the 2022 and 2024 editions; it had also hosted the 2003 edition.

All matches took place at the COP Arena – Estadio Óscar Harrison located within the Parque Olímpico sports complex in Luque.

== Draw ==
The draw of the tournament was held on 18 December 2025 at the CONMEBOL Convention Centre in Luque, Paraguay. The hosts, Paraguay, and the previous tournament's champions, Brazil, were seeded and assigned to the head of the groups A and B respectively. The remaining eight teams were split into four "pairing pots" based on the final placement they reached in the previous edition of the tournament (shown in brackets).

Pot 1	Pot 2	Pot 3	Pot 4
Argentina (2); Venezuela (3)	Uruguay (5); Chile (6)	Peru (7); Colombia (8)	Bolivia (9); Ecuador (10)

From each pot, the first team drawn was placed into Group A and the second team drawn was placed into Group B. In both groups, teams from pot 1 were allocated in position 2, teams from pot 2 in position 3, teams from pot 3 in position 4 and teams from pot 4 in position 5.

The draw resulted in the following groups:

Group A
Pos	Team
A1	Paraguay
A2	Argentina
A3	Uruguay
A4	Peru
A5	Ecuador

Group B
Pos	Team
B1	Brazil
B2	Venezuela
B3	Chile
B4	Colombia
B5	Bolivia

== Match officials ==
In January 2026, CONMEBOL announced the referees appointed for the tournament.

== Group stage ==
The top two teams of each group advanced to the semi-finals.

Tiebreakers

In the preliminary stage, the teams were ranked according to points earned (three points for a win, one for a draw, none for a defeat). If tied on points, tiebreakers would be applied in the following order (Regulations Article 19 and 20):

1. Head-to-head result between tied teams;
  1. Points in head-to-head matches among the tied teams;
  2. Goal difference in head-to-head matches among the tied teams;
  3. Goals scored in head-to-head matches among the tied teams;
2. Goal difference in all group matches;
3. Goals scored in all group matches;
4. Fewer red cards;
5. Fewer yellow cards;
6. Drawing of lots.

All match times are in PYST (UTC−3), as listed by CONMEBOL.

=== Group A ===
Pos	Team	Pld	W	D	L	GF	GA	GD	Pts	Qualification
1	Argentina	4	3	1	0	13	3	+10	10	Semi-finals
2	Peru	4	3	0	1	11	7	+4	9	Semi-finals
3	Uruguay	4	2	1	1	7	6	+1	7	Fifth place play-off
4	Paraguay (H)	4	1	0	3	7	10	−3	3	Seventh place play-off
5	Ecuador	4	0	0	4	4	16	−12	0	Ninth place play-off

Source: CONMEBOL
Rules for classification: Group stage tiebreakers
(H) Hosts
1. Uruguay 3–2 Ecuador
2. Peru 3–1 Paraguay
3. Argentina 4–1 Peru
4. Paraguay 4–1 Ecuador
5. Peru 5–1 Ecuador
6. Argentina 1–1 Uruguay
7. Argentina 4–0 Ecuador
8. Uruguay 2–1 Paraguay
9. Peru 2–1 Uruguay
10. Argentina 4–1 Paraguay

=== Group B ===
Pos	Team	Pld	W	D	L	GF	GA	GD	Pts	Qualification
1	Brazil	4	3	1	0	12	3	+9	10	Semi-finals
2	Venezuela	4	3	0	1	14	8	+6	9	Semi-finals
3	Colombia	4	1	2	1	8	8	0	5	Fifth place play-off
4	Chile	4	1	1	2	8	8	0	4	Seventh place play-off
5	Bolivia	4	0	0	4	3	18	−15	0	Ninth place play-off

Source: CONMEBOL
Rules for classification: Group stage tiebreakers
1. Chile 4-0 Bolivia
2. Colombia 2-2 Brazil
3. Venezuela 3-2 Colombia
4. Brazil 6-0 Bolivia
5. Colombia 2-1 Bolivia
6. Venezuela 4-2 Chile
7. Venezuela 6-2 Bolivia
8. Brazil 2-0 Chile
9. Chile 2-2 Colombia
10. Brazil 2-1 Venezuela

== Final stage ==
In the final stage, if a match is tied after the regular playing time (Regulations Article 20):

- In the semi-finals and final, two extra time periods of five minutes each would be played. If still tied after extra time, the match would be decided by a penalty shoot-out.
- In the play-offs for third, fifth, seventh, and ninth place, extra time would not be played, and the match would be decided directly by a penalty shoot-out.

All match times are in PYST (UTC−3), as listed by CONMEBOL.

=== Bracket ===
Semi-finals
31 January
Argentina	2
Venezuela	0
31 January
Brazil	4
Peru	2

Final
1 February
Argentina	1
Brazil	2
Third place play-off
1 February
Venezuela	1
Peru	4

Ninth place play-off
31 January
Ecuador	2
Bolivia	0

Seventh place play-off
31 January
Paraguay	2
Chile	3

Fifth place play-off
1 February
Uruguay	2
Colombia	3

=== Semi-finals ===
31 January 2024
19:15

Brazil	4–2	Peru

COP Arena – Estadio Óscar Harrison, Luque

31 January 2024
16:30

Argentina	2–0	Venezuela

COP Arena – Estadio Óscar Harrison, Luque

=== Ninth place play-off ===
31 January 2024
11:30

Ecuador	2–0	Bolivia

COP Arena – Estadio Óscar Harrison, Luque

=== Seventh place play-off ===
31 January 2024
14:00

Paraguay	2–3	Chile

COP Arena – Estadio Óscar Harrison, Luque

=== Fifth place play-off ===
1 February 2024
11:30

Uruguay	2–3	Colombia

COP Arena – Estadio Óscar Harrison, Luque

=== Third place play-off ===
1 February 2024
14:00

Venezuela	1–4	Peru

COP Arena – Estadio Óscar Harrison, Luque

=== Final ===
1 February 2026
17:00

Argentina	1–2	Brazil

COP Arena – Estadio Óscar Harrison, Luque

== Ranking ==
Rank	Team	M	W	D	L	GF	GA	GD	Points
1	Brazil	6	5	1	0	18	6	+12	16
2	Argentina	6	4	1	1	17	6	+11	13
3	Peru	6	4	0	2	17	12	+5	12
4	Venezuela	6	3	0	3	15	14	+1	9
5	Colombia	5	2	2	1	11	10	+1	8
6	Uruguay	5	2	1	2	9	9	0	7
7	Chile	5	2	1	2	11	10	+1	7
8	Paraguay	5	1	0	4	9	13	−4	3
9	Ecuador	5	1	0	4	6	16	−10	3
10	Bolivia	5	0	0	5	3	20	−17	0
