= 2019 Copa América de Futsal =

CONMEBOL Copa América de Futsal Chile 2019

Tournament details
- Host country: Chile
- City: Los Ángeles
- Dates: Cancelled (23–30 October 2019)
- Teams: 10 (from 1 confederation)
- Venue: 1 (in 1 host city)

The 2019 CONMEBOL Copa América de Futsal was going to be the 13th edition of the Copa América de Futsal, the international futsal championship under FIFA rules organised by CONMEBOL for the men's national teams of South America. The tournament was originally to be held in Los Ángeles, Chile between 23–30 October 2019. However, on 22 October 2019, one day before the start of the tournament, CONMEBOL announced that it was cancelled due to the Chilean protests.

Brazil were the defending champions.

== Teams ==
All ten CONMEBOL member national teams entered the tournament.

| Team | Would-be Appearance | Previous best top-4 performance |
|---|---|---|
| Argentina | 13th | Champions (2003, 2015) |
| Bolivia | 6th | Fourth place (2000) |
| Brazil (holders) | 13th | Champions (1992, 1995, 1996, 1997, 1998, 1999, 2000, 2008, 2011, 2017) |
| Chile (hosts) | 8th | None |
| Colombia | 7th | Fourth place (2011, 2015) |
| Ecuador | 7th | Fourth place (1992) |
| Paraguay | 13th | Runners-up (1998, 1999, 2015) |
| Peru | 7th | None |
| Uruguay | 11th | Runners-up (1996, 2008) |
| Venezuela | 7th | None |

== Venues ==
The matches were originally to be played at the Polideportivo de Los Ángeles in Los Ángeles.

== Draw ==
The draw of the tournament was held on 26 September 2019, 12:30 CLST (UTC−3), at the Hotel Four Points at Los Ángeles, Chile. The ten teams were drawn into two groups of five. The hosts, Chile, and the title holders, Brazil, were seeded in Groups A and B respectively, while the other eight teams were divided into four pots based on their results in the 2017 Copa América de Futsal, and were drawn to the remaining group positions.

| Seeded | Pot 1 | Pot 2 | Pot 3 | Pot 4 |
|---|---|---|---|---|
| Chile (assigned to A1); Brazil (assigned to B1) | Argentina; Paraguay | Uruguay; Colombia | Venezuela; Bolivia | Ecuador; Peru |

== Squads ==
Each team has to submit a squad of 14 players, including a minimum of two goalkeepers.

== Group stage ==
The top two teams of each group advance to the semi-finals.

Tiebreakers

The ranking of teams in the first stage is determined as follows:

1. Points obtained in all group matches (three points for a win, one for a draw, none for a defeat);
2. Goal difference in all group matches;
3. Number of goals scored in all group matches;
4. Points obtained in the matches played between the teams in question;
5. Goal difference in the matches played between the teams in question;
6. Number of goals scored in the matches played between the teams in question;
7. Fair play points in all group matches (only one deduction could be applied to a player in a single match):
  - Yellow card: −1 points;
  - Indirect red card (second yellow card): −3 points;
  - Direct red card: −4 points;
  - Yellow card and direct red card: −5 points;
8. Drawing of lots.

All times local, CLST (UTC−3).

=== Group A ===
| Pos | Team | Pld | W | D | L | GF | GA | GD | Pts | Qualification |
|---|---|---|---|---|---|---|---|---|---|---|
| 1 | Chile (H) | 0 | 0 | 0 | 0 | 0 | 0 | 0 | 0 | Knockout stage |
| 2 | Bolivia | 0 | 0 | 0 | 0 | 0 | 0 | 0 | 0 | Knockout stage |
| 3 | Ecuador | 0 | 0 | 0 | 0 | 0 | 0 | 0 | 0 | Fifth place play-off |
| 4 | Uruguay | 0 | 0 | 0 | 0 | 0 | 0 | 0 | 0 | Seventh place play-off |
| 5 | Argentina | 0 | 0 | 0 | 0 | 0 | 0 | 0 | 0 | Ninth place play-off |

First match(es) will be played: 23 October 2019. Source: CONMEBOL
Rules for classification: Group stage tiebreakers
(H) Hosts
23 October 2019
18:15

| Bolivia | Cancelled | Argentina |

Polideportivo de Los Ángeles, Los Ángeles
23 October 2019
20:15

| Chile | Cancelled | Uruguay |

Polideportivo de Los Ángeles, Los Ángeles

24 October 2019
18:00

| Uruguay | Cancelled | Argentina |

Polideportivo de Los Ángeles, Los Ángeles
24 October 2019
20:00

| Chile | Cancelled | Ecuador |

Polideportivo de Los Ángeles, Los Ángeles

25 October 2019
18:00

| Bolivia | Cancelled | Uruguay |

Polideportivo de Los Ángeles, Los Ángeles
25 October 2019
20:00

| Argentina | Cancelled | Ecuador |

Polideportivo de Los Ángeles, Los Ángeles

26 October 2019
18:00

| Bolivia | Cancelled | Ecuador |

Polideportivo de Los Ángeles, Los Ángeles
26 October 2019
20:00

| Chile | Cancelled | Argentina |

Polideportivo de Los Ángeles, Los Ángeles

27 October 2019
18:00

| Ecuador | Cancelled | Uruguay |

Polideportivo de Los Ángeles, Los Ángeles
27 October 2019
20:00

| Chile | Cancelled | Bolivia |

Polideportivo de Los Ángeles, Los Ángeles

=== Group B ===
| Pos | Team | Pld | W | D | L | GF | GA | GD | Pts | Qualification |
|---|---|---|---|---|---|---|---|---|---|---|
| 1 | Brazil | 0 | 0 | 0 | 0 | 0 | 0 | 0 | 0 | Knockout stage |
| 2 | Venezuela | 0 | 0 | 0 | 0 | 0 | 0 | 0 | 0 | Knockout stage |
| 3 | Colombia | 0 | 0 | 0 | 0 | 0 | 0 | 0 | 0 | Fifth place play-off |
| 4 | Paraguay | 0 | 0 | 0 | 0 | 0 | 0 | 0 | 0 | Seventh place play-off |
| 5 | Peru | 0 | 0 | 0 | 0 | 0 | 0 | 0 | 0 | Ninth place play-off |

First match(es) will be played: 23 October 2019. Source: CONMEBOL
Rules for classification: Group stage tiebreakers
23 October 2019
13:30

| Venezuela | Cancelled | Peru |

Polideportivo de Los Ángeles, Los Ángeles
23 October 2019
15:30

| Brazil | Cancelled | Paraguay |

Polideportivo de Los Ángeles, Los Ángeles

24 October 2019
13:30

| Paraguay | Cancelled | Peru |

Polideportivo de Los Ángeles, Los Ángeles
24 October 2019
15:30

| Brazil | Cancelled | Colombia |

Polideportivo de Los Ángeles, Los Ángeles

25 October 2019
13:30

| Venezuela | Cancelled | Paraguay |

Polideportivo de Los Ángeles, Los Ángeles
25 October 2019
15:30

| Peru | Cancelled | Colombia |

Polideportivo de Los Ángeles, Los Ángeles

26 October 2019
13:30

| Venezuela | Cancelled | Colombia |

Polideportivo de Los Ángeles, Los Ángeles
26 October 2019
15:30

| Brazil | Cancelled | Peru |

Polideportivo de Los Ángeles, Los Ángeles

27 October 2019
13:30

| Colombia | Cancelled | Paraguay |

Polideportivo de Los Ángeles, Los Ángeles
27 October 2019
15:30

| Brazil | Cancelled | Venezuela |

Polideportivo de Los Ángeles, Los Ángeles

== Knockout stage ==
In the knockout stage, extra time and penalty shoot-out would be used to decide the winner if necessary (no extra time would be used in the play-offs for third to tenth place).

=== Bracket ===
Semi-finals
29 October
1st Group A
2nd Group B
29 October
1st Group B
2nd Group A

Final
30 October
Winner SF1
Winner SF2
Third place play-off
30 October
Loser SF1
Loser SF2

| Fifth place play-off |
| 30 October |
| 3rd Group A |
| 3rd Group B |

| Seventh place play-off |
| 30 October |
| 4th Group A |
| 4th Group B |

| Ninth place play-off |
| 29 October |
| 5th Group A |
| 5th Group B |

=== Ninth place play-off ===
29 October 2019
15:30

| 5th Group A | Cancelled | 5th Group B |

Polideportivo de Los Ángeles, Los Ángeles

=== Semi-finals ===
29 October 2019
18:00

| 1st Group A | Cancelled | 2nd Group B |

Polideportivo de Los Ángeles, Los Ángeles

29 October 2019
20:00

| 1st Group B | Cancelled | 2nd Group A |

Polideportivo de Los Ángeles, Los Ángeles

=== Seventh place play-off ===
30 October 2019
13:30

| 4th Group A | Cancelled | 4th Group B |

Polideportivo de Los Ángeles, Los Ángeles

=== Fifth place play-off ===
30 October 2019
15:30

| 3rd Group A | Cancelled | 3rd Group B |

Polideportivo de Los Ángeles, Los Ángeles

=== Third place play-off ===
30 October 2019
18:00

| Loser SF1 | Cancelled | Loser SF2 |

Polideportivo de Los Ángeles, Los Ángeles

=== Final ===
30 October 2019
20:00

| Winner SF1 | Cancelled | Winner SF2 |

Polideportivo de Los Ángeles, Los Ángeles
