= 2024 Copa América de Futsal =

CONMEBOL Copa América de Futsal Paraguay 2024

Tournament details
- Host country: Paraguay
- City: Luque
- Dates: 2–10 February
- Teams: 10 (from 1 confederation)
- Venue: COP Arena – Estadio Óscar Harrison

Final positions
- Champions: Brazil (11th title)
- Runners-up: Argentina
- Third place: Venezuela
- Fourth place: Paraguay

Tournament statistics
- Matches played: 27
- Goals scored: 108 (4 per match)
- Top scorer(s): (Brazil) Arthur Guilherme (Brazil) Rafa Santos (Colombia) Felipe Echavarría (4 goals each)

The 2024 CONMEBOL Copa América de Futsal was the 14th edition of the Copa América de Futsal, the international futsal championship under FIFA rules organised by CONMEBOL for the men's national teams of South America. It was held in Luque, Paraguay from 2 to 10 February 2024.

This edition marked the return of the tournament as the CONMEBOL qualifiers for the FIFA Futsal World Cup (the last time was in 2008) after CONMEBOL decided to discontinue its specific qualifying tournament for that purpose after three editions in 2012, 2016 and 2020. The top four teams of the tournament (the four semi-finalists) qualified for the 2024 FIFA Futsal World Cup in Uzbekistan as the CONMEBOL representatives.

Argentina were the defending champions.

== Teams ==
All ten CONMEBOL member national teams entered the tournament.

Team	Appearance	Previous best top-4 performance
Argentina (holders)	14th	Champions (2003, 2015, 2022)
Bolivia	7th	Fourth place (2000)
Brazil	14th	Champions (1992, 1995, 1996, 1997, 1998, 1999, 2000, 2008, 2011, 2017)
Chile	9th	None
Colombia	8th	Fourth place (2011, 2015, 2022)
Ecuador	8th	Fourth place (1992)
Paraguay (hosts)	14th	Runners-up (1998, 1999, 2015, 2022)
Peru	8th	None
Uruguay	12th	Runners-up (1996, 2008)
Venezuela	8th	None

=== Squads ===
Each national team had to submit a squad of at least 10 and up to 14 players, including a minimum of two goalkeepers (Regulations Article 45). Members of each squad are listed on the CONMEBOL website.

== Venue ==
On 19 December 2023, CONMEBOL confirmed Luque, Paraguay as the host city. This is the third time that Paraguay host the tournament and the second consecutive time after the previous edition in 2022; it had also hosted the 2003 edition.

All matches took place at the COP Arena – Estadio Óscar Harrison located within the Parque Olímpico sports complex in Luque.

== Draw ==
The draw of the tournament was held on 12 January 2024, 11:00 PYST (UTC−3), at the CONMEBOL Convention Centre in Luque, Paraguay. The hosts, Paraguay, and the previous tournament's champions, Argentina, were seeded and assigned to the head of the groups A and B respectively. The remaining eight teams were split into four "pairing pots" (Brazil–Colombia, Uruguay–Venezuela, Ecuador–Bolivia, Peru–Chile) based on the final placement they reached in the previous edition of the tournament (shown in brackets).

Pot 1	Pot 2	Pot 3	Pot 4
Brazil (3); Colombia (4)	Uruguay (5); Venezuela (6)	Ecuador (7); Bolivia (8)	Peru (9); Chile (10)

From each pot, the first team drawn was placed into Group A and the second team drawn was placed into Group B. In both groups, teams from pot 1 were allocated in position 2, teams from pot 2 in position 3, teams from pot 3 in position 4 and teams from pot 4 in position 5.

The draw resulted in the following groups:

Group A
Pos	Team
A1	Paraguay
A2	Colombia
A3	Venezuela
A4	Ecuador
A5	Chile

Group B
Pos	Team
B1	Argentina
B2	Brazil
B3	Uruguay
B4	Bolivia
B5	Peru

== Match officials ==
On 18 January 2024, CONMEBOL announced the referees appointed by its Referees Commission for the tournament.

Association	Referees
Argentina	Andrés Pena García, Lautaro Romero and Estefania Pinto
Bolivia	Henry Gutierrez
Brazil	Ricardo Messa and Anelize Schulz
Chile	Christian Espíndola, Rodrigo Concha and Valeria Palma
Colombia	Yuri García and Daniel Manrique
Ecuador	Jonathan Herbas and Leonel Ruales
Paraguay	Bill Villalba and Carlos Martínez
Peru	Rolly Rojas and Ulises Ureta
Uruguay	Daniel Rodríguez, Andrés Martínez and Federico Piccardo
Venezuela	Oriana Zambrano and Junior Patiño

== Group stage ==
The top two teams of each group advanced to the semi-finals and qualify for the 2024 FIFA Futsal World Cup.

Tiebreakers

In the preliminary stage, the teams were ranked according to points earned (three points for a win, one for a draw, none for a defeat). If tied on points, tiebreakers would be applied in the following order (Regulations Article 19 and 20):

1. Head-to-head result between tied teams;
  1. Points in head-to-head matches among the tied teams;
  2. Goal difference in head-to-head matches among the tied teams;
  3. Goals scored in head-to-head matches among the tied teams;
2. Goal difference in all group matches;
3. Goals scored in all group matches;
4. Fewer red cards;
5. Fewer yellow cards;
6. Drawing of lots.

All match times are in PYST (UTC−3), as listed by CONMEBOL.

=== Group A ===
Pos	Team	Pld	W	D	L	GF	GA	GD	Pts	Qualification
1	Paraguay (H)	4	2	2	0	8	3	+5	8	Semi-finals and 2024 FIFA Futsal World Cup
2	Venezuela	4	2	1	1	11	3	+8	7 (Note: Head-to-head points: Venezuela 3, Chile 0.)	Semi-finals and 2024 FIFA Futsal World Cup
3	Chile	4	2	1	1	10	9	+1	7	Fifth place play-off
4	Colombia	4	2	0	2	9	9	0	6	Seventh place play-off
5	Ecuador	4	0	0	4	5	19	−14	0	Ninth place play-off

Source: CONMEBOL
Rules for classification: Group stage tiebreakers
(H) Hosts
Notes:
2 February 2024
17:00

Chile	1–2	Venezuela
Sebastián Figueroa 11'	Report	Rafael Morillo 10'; Milton Francia 33' (pen.)

COP Arena – Estadio Óscar Harrison, Luque
Referee: Ricardo Messa (Brazil)
2 February 2024
19:15

Paraguay	2–1	Ecuador
Jorge Espinoza 15'; Javier Salas 19'	CONMEBOL; APF	Bryan Montaño 35'

COP Arena – Estadio Óscar Harrison, Luque
Referee: Rolly Rojas (Peru)

3 February 2024
17:00

Ecuador	1–5	Colombia
Jordan Mercado 1T'	Report	Felipe Echavarría 1T', 2T', 2T'; Eduardo Riaño 1T'; Luis Posada 2T'

COP Arena – Estadio Óscar Harrison, Luque
Referee: Lautaro Romero (Argentina)
3 February 2024
19:15

Chile	2–2	Paraguay
Javier Fuentealba 10'; Sebastián Figueroa 36'	CONMEBOL; APF	Jorge Espinoza 7', 37'

COP Arena – Estadio Óscar Harrison, Luque
Referee: Henry Gutierrez (Bolivia)

4 February 2024
17:00

Ecuador	3–4	Chile
Bryan Salazar 2T'; Dalember Segura 2T'; Jimmy Espinales 2T'	Report	Javier Fuentealba 2T'; Renato Martínez-Conde 2T'; Nicolás Lagos 2T'; Bernardo Araya 2T'

COP Arena – Estadio Óscar Harrison, Luque
Referee: Daniel Rodríguez (Uruguay)
4 February 2024
19:15

Colombia	2–1	Venezuela
Angellot Caro 5'; Jorge Cuervo 35'	Report	Maikel Torres 19'

COP Arena – Estadio Óscar Harrison, Luque
Referee: Andrés Pena García (Argentina)

6 February 2024
17:00

Colombia	2–3	Chile
Felipe Echavarría 19'; Harrison Santos 37'	CONMEBOL; APF	Sebastián Figueroa 30'; Nicolas Lagos 35'; Bilan De La Paz 40' (pen.)

COP Arena – Estadio Óscar Harrison, Luque
Referee: Rolly Rojas (Peru)
6 February 2024
19:15

Venezuela	0–0	Paraguay
	CONMEBOL; APF

COP Arena – Estadio Óscar Harrison, Luque
Referee: Daniel Rodríguez (Uruguay)

7 February 2024
17:00

Venezuela	8–0	Ecuador
Wilmer Cabarcas 1T'; Milton Francia 1T'; Kevin Briceño 1T', 1T'; Carlos Vento 1T'; Jean Trujillo 2T', 2T', 2T'	Report

COP Arena – Estadio Óscar Harrison, Luque
Referee: Rolly Rojas (Peru)
7 February 2024
19:15

Paraguay	4–0	Colombia
Pedro Pascottini 3'; Emerson Méndez 18'; Francisco Martínez 28'; Daniel Ozuna 38'	CONMEBOL; APF

COP Arena – Estadio Óscar Harrison, Luque
Referee: Andrés Pena García (Argentina)

=== Group B ===
Pos	Team	Pld	W	D	L	GF	GA	GD	Pts	Qualification
1	Brazil	4	4	0	0	21	3	+18	12	Semi-finals and 2024 FIFA Futsal World Cup
2	Argentina	4	3	0	1	11	5	+6	9	Semi-finals and 2024 FIFA Futsal World Cup
3	Uruguay	4	2	0	2	7	7	0	6	Fifth place play-off
4	Peru	4	1	0	3	5	17	−12	3	Seventh place play-off
5	Bolivia	4	0	0	4	3	15	−12	0	Ninth place play-off

Source: CONMEBOL
Rules for classification: Group stage tiebreakers
2 February 2024
11:45

Peru	1–5	Uruguay
Xavier Tavera 36' (pen.)	Report	Nicolás Martínez 3'; Brandon Díaz 23'; Mathías Fernández 32'; Nicolás Lamas 34'; Ignacio Salgués 40'

COP Arena – Estadio Óscar Harrison, Luque
Referee: Bill Villalba (Paraguay)
2 February 2024
14:00

Argentina	4–0	Bolivia
Santiago Basile 18'; Matías Rosa 18', 40'; Constantino Vaporaki 19'	Report

COP Arena – Estadio Óscar Harrison, Luque
Referee: Rodrigo Concha (Chile)

3 February 2024
11:45

Bolivia	1–7	Brazil
Alejandro Choqueticlla 40'	Report	Arthur Guilherme 7', 8', 10'; Gadeia 34'; Felipe Valério 35'; Vinícius Rocha 35'; Diego Nunes 38'

COP Arena – Estadio Óscar Harrison, Luque
Referee: Yuri García (Colombia)
3 February 2024
14:00

Peru	1–4	Argentina
Toni Alvarado 25'	Report	Borruto 27'; Matías Rosa 30'; Juan Pablo Saravia 33' (o.g.); Sebastián Corso 39'

COP Arena – Estadio Óscar Harrison, Luque
Referee: Christian Espíndola (Chile)

4 February 2024
11:45

Bolivia	2–3	Peru
Bruno Tecos 6'; Joel Guzmán 20'	Report	Toni Alvarado 12'; Denilson Zegarra 29'; Miguel Padilla 40' (o.g.)

COP Arena – Estadio Óscar Harrison, Luque
Referee: Carlos Martínez (Paraguay)
4 February 2024
14:00

Brazil	4–1	Uruguay
Dyego Zuffo 19'; Pito 22'; Arthur Guilherme 27'; Rafa Santos 34'	Report	Nicolás Lamas 21'

COP Arena – Estadio Óscar Harrison, Luque
Referee: Christian Espíndola (Chile)

6 February 2024
11:45

Brazil	6–0	Peru
Rafa Santos 4', 25'; Pito 12'; Felipe Valério 13'; Vinícius Rocha 18'; Leandro Lino 20'	CONMEBOL; APF

COP Arena – Estadio Óscar Harrison, Luque
Referee: Junior Patiño (Venezuela)
6 February 2024
14:00

Uruguay	0–2	Argentina
	CONMEBOL; APF	Lucas Tripodi 31'; Pablo Taborda 40'

COP Arena – Estadio Óscar Harrison, Luque
Referee: Yuri García (Colombia)

7 February 2024
11:45

Uruguay	1–0	Bolivia
Brandon Díaz 36'	Report

COP Arena – Estadio Óscar Harrison, Luque
Referee: Valeria Palma (Chile)
7 February 2024
14:00

Argentina	1–4	Brazil
Borruto 14'	Report	Marlon 11'; Felipe Valério 25'; Lucas Flores 25' (o.g.); Dyego Zuffo 36'

COP Arena – Estadio Óscar Harrison, Luque
Referee: Christian Espíndola (Chile)

== Final stage ==
In the final stage, if a match is tied after the regular playing time (Regulations Article 20):

- In the semi-finals and final, two extra time periods of five minutes each would be played. If still tied after extra time, the match would be decided by a penalty shoot-out.
- In the play-offs for third, fifth, seventh, and ninth place, extra time would not be played, and the match would be decided directly by a penalty shoot-out.

All match times are in PYST (UTC−3), as listed by CONMEBOL.

=== Bracket ===
Semi-finals
9 February
Paraguay	0
Argentina	1
9 February
Brazil	3
Venezuela	0

Final
10 February
Argentina	0
Brazil	2
Third place play-off
10 February
Paraguay	1
Venezuela	4

Ninth place play-off
9 February
Ecuador	0 (6)
Bolivia	0 (7)

Seventh place play-off
9 February
Colombia	1
Peru	4

Fifth place play-off
10 February
Chile	0
Uruguay	2

=== Semi-finals ===
9 February 2024
16:45

Brazil	3–0	Venezuela
Marcênio 12', 29'; Vinícius Rocha 39'	CONMEBOL; APF

COP Arena – Estadio Óscar Harrison, Luque
Referee: Ulises Ureta (Peru)

9 February 2024
19:30

Paraguay	0–1	Argentina
	CONMEBOL; APF	Matías Rosa 6'

COP Arena – Estadio Óscar Harrison, Luque
Referee: Yuri García (Colombia)

=== Ninth place play-off ===
9 February 2024
11:45

Ecuador	0–0	Bolivia
	CONMEBOL; APF
Penalties
Steven Soria (penalty scored); Jordan Mercado (penalty scored); Alejandro Nazareno (penalty scored); Bryan Montaño (penalty scored); Bryan Salazar (penalty missed); Dalember Segura (penalty scored); Jimmy Espinales (penalty scored); Felipe Cortez (penalty missed)	6–7	(penalty scored) Carlos Ramos; (penalty scored) Rubén Sandi; (penalty scored) Miguel Padilla; (penalty scored) Alan Valda; (penalty missed) Joel Guzmán; (penalty scored) Saúl Gareca; (penalty scored) Bruno Tecos; (penalty scored) Horacio Miranda

COP Arena – Estadio Óscar Harrison, Luque
Referee: Estefania Pinto (Argentina)

=== Seventh place play-off ===
9 February 2024
14:15

Colombia	1–4	Peru
Julián Pardo 24'	CONMEBOL; APF	Luis Pier Ramos 7'; Xavier Tavera 12', 37'; Juan Pablo Saravia 30'

COP Arena – Estadio Óscar Harrison, Luque
Referee: Anelize Schulz (Brazil)

=== Fifth place play-off ===
10 February 2024
14:00

Chile	0–2	Uruguay
	Report	Agustín Sosa 34', 40'

COP Arena – Estadio Óscar Harrison, Luque
Referee: Andrés Pena García (Argentina)

=== Third place play-off ===
10 February 2024
16:30

Paraguay	1–4	Venezuela
Pedro Pascottini 24'	CONMEBOL; APF	Rafael Morillo 14'; Carlos Sanz 21'; Víctor Carreño 39'; Jean Trujillo 40'

COP Arena – Estadio Óscar Harrison, Luque
Referee: Lautaro Romero (Argentina)

=== Final ===
10 February 2024
19:30

Argentina	0–2	Brazil
	CONMEBOL; APF	Pito 10'; Rafa Santos 40'

COP Arena – Estadio Óscar Harrison, Luque
Referee: Christian Espíndola (Chile)

== Qualified teams for FIFA Futsal World Cup ==
The following four teams from CONMEBOL qualified for the 2024 FIFA Futsal World Cup in Uzbekistan.

Team	Qualified on	Previous appearances in FIFA Futsal World Cup^{1}
Brazil	6 February 2024	9 (**1989**, **1992**, **1996**, 2000, 2004, **2008**, **2012**, 2016, 2021)
Argentina	6 February 2024	9 (1989, 1992, 1996, 2000, 2004, 2008, 2012, **2016**, 2021)
Venezuela	7 February 2024	1 (2021)
Paraguay	7 February 2024	7 (1989, 1992, 2004, 2008, 2012, 2016, 2021)

^{1} Bold indicates champions for that year. Italic indicates hosts for that year.

== Ranking ==
Rank	Team	M	W	D	L	GF	GA	GD	Points
1	Brazil	6	6	0	0	26	3	+23	18
2	Argentina	6	4	0	2	12	7	+5	12
3	Venezuela	6	3	1	2	15	7	+8	10
4	Paraguay	6	2	2	2	9	8	+1	8
5	Uruguay	5	3	0	2	9	7	+2	9
6	Chile	5	2	1	2	10	11	−1	7
7	Peru	5	2	0	3	9	18	−9	6
8	Colombia	5	2	0	3	10	13	−3	6
9	Bolivia	5	0	1	4	3	15	−12	1
10	Ecuador	5	0	1	4	5	19	−14	1
