= Colombia national futsal team =

Colombia
- Nickname(s): Los Cafeteros (The Coffee growers)
- Association: FIFA: Federación Colombiana de Fútbol; AMF: Fecolfutsal
- Confederation: FIFA: CONMEBOL (South America); AMF: CSFS, CPFS, CONCACFUTSAL
- Head coach: FIFA: Arney Fonnegra; AMF: Jaime Cuervo
- FIFA code: COL
- FIFA ranking: 26 ▲1 (8 May 2026)
Home colours	Away colours

First international
- FIFA; Colombia 5–2 Bolivia (Asunción, Paraguay; 26 August 2003)

Biggest win
- FIFA; Colombia 11–3 Solomon Islands (Bangkok, Thailand; 6 November 2012); Ecuador 1–9 Colombia (San Juan, Argentina; 6 April 2017); AMF; Colombia 21–0 Ecuador (Sopó, Colombia; 3 December 2025)

Biggest defeat
- FIFA; Paraguay 6–0 Colombia (Mar del Plata, Argentina; 17 November 2006); AMF; Brazil 5–0 Colombia (Puerto Iguazú, Argentina; 28 September 1986); Colombia 1–6 Brazil (Milan, Italy; 12 June 1991)

FIFA World Cup
- Appearances: 2 (First in 2012)
- Best result: Fourth place (2012)

AMF World Cup
- Appearances: 9 (First in 1982)
- Best result: (gold) Champions (2000, 2011, 2015)

Copa América
- Appearances: 5 (First in 2003)
- Best result: Fourth place (2011, 2015)

South American Futsal Championship
- Appearances: 6 (First in 1977)
- Best result: (gold) Champions (2014)

Confederations Cup
- Appearances: 1 (First in 2013)
- Best result: Runners-up (2013)

Grand Prix de Futsal
- Appearances: 4 (First in 2005)
- Best result: (silver) Runners-up (2005, 2014)

The Colombia national futsal team represents Colombia in international futsal competitions. It is overseen by the Colombian Football Federation in FIFA competitions and by the Fecolfutsal in AMF competitions.

The team's most notable performance in the FIFA Futsal World Cup was at the 2012 FIFA Futsal World Cup in Thailand, where they achieved fourth place. In the Copa América, the regional competition, the best results of the team were achieving fourth place in 2011 and 2015. In the AMF Futsal World Cup, the team was champion three times: 2000, 2011 and 2015. The team was also champion in the 2014 South American Futsal Championship.

== Competitive record ==
*Draws include knockout matches decided on penalty kicks.
**Gold background colour indicates that the tournament was won.
***Red border colour indicates tournament was held on home soil.

Champions Runners-up Third Place Fourth place

=== AMF ===
==== AMF Futsal World Cup ====
Year	Round	Position	Pld	W	D*	L	GF	GA
(Brazil) 1982	Fourth place	4th	6	2	1	3	14	11
(Spain) 1985	Did not enter							
(Australia) 1988	Did not enter							
(Italy) 1991	Ninth place	9th	6	5	0	1	52	13
(Argentina) 1994	Runners-up	2nd	6	3	2	1	24	12
(Mexico) 1997	Sixth place	6th	6	4	1	1	39	9
(Bolivia) 2000	Champions	1st	6	4	1	1	39	13
(Paraguay) 2003	Runners-up	2nd	7	5	1	1	40	19
(Argentina) 2007	Third place	3rd	6	5	0	1	40	17
(Colombia) 2011	Champions	1st	6	6	0	0	33	6
(Belarus) 2015	Champions	1st	6	6	0	0	34	6
(Argentina) 2019	Fifth place	5th	5	4	0	1	30	6
(Mexico) 2023	Third place	3rd	6	5	1	0	41	4
Total	Champions	11/13	66	49	7	10	386	116

=== FIFA ===
==== FIFA Futsal World Cup ====
FIFA World Cup record									FIFA World Cup qualification record					
Year	Round	Position	Pld	W	D*	L	GF	GA	Pld	W	D*	L	GF	GA
(Netherlands) 1989	Did not enter								Invited teams only					
(Hong Kong) 1992	Did not enter								Qualification by Copa América					
(Spain) 1996	Did not enter								Qualification by Copa América					
(Guatemala) 2000	Did not enter								Qualification by Copa América					
(Chinese Taipei) 2004	Did not qualify								Qualification by Copa América					
(Brazil) 2008	Did not qualify								Qualification by Copa América					
(Thailand) 2012	Fourth place	4th	7	3	0	4	19	18	6	3	0	3	20	14
(Colombia) 2016	Round of 16	12th	4	1	3	0	8	7	5	2	0	3	14	16
(Lithuania) 2021	Did not qualify								4	2	0	2	9	9
(Uzbekistan) 2024	Did not qualify								Qualification by Copa América					
Total	Fourth place	2/10	11	4	3	4	27	25	15	7	0	8	43	39

==== Copa América de Futsal ====
Year	Round	Position	Pld	W	D*	L	GF	GA
(Brazil) 1992	Did not enter							
(Brazil) 1995	Did not enter							
(Brazil) 1996	Did not enter							
(Brazil) 1997	Did not enter							
(Brazil) 1998	Did not enter							
(Brazil) 1999	Did not enter							
(Brazil) 2000	Did not enter							
(Paraguay) 2003	First Round		2	1	0	1	8	7
(Uruguay) 2008	Fifth place	5th	3	2	0	1	12	7
(Argentina) 2011	Fourth place	4th	6	3	1	2	12	11
(Ecuador) 2015	Fourth place	4th	5	2	0	3	7	12
(Argentina) 2017	Fifth place	5th	5	2	2	1	26	19
(Chile) 2019	Suspended							
(Paraguay) 2022	Fourth place	4th	6	3	0	3	14	14
(Paraguay) 2024	Eighth place	8th	5	2	0	3	10	13
(Paraguay) 2026	Fifth place	5th	5	2	2	1	11	10
Total	Fourth place	8/16	37	17	5	15	100	93

==== FIFA Futsal World Cup qualification (CONMEBOL)/CONMEBOL Preliminary Competition ====
Year	Round	Position	Pld	W	D*	L	GF	GA
(Brazil) 2012	Fourth place	4th	6	3	0	3	20	14
(Argentina) 2016	Sixth place	6th	5	2	0	3	14	16
(Brazil) 2020	Fifth place	5th	4	2	0	2	9	9
Total	Fourth place	3/3	15	7	0	8	43	39

==== CONMEBOL Futsal Evolution League ====
Year	Round	Position	Pld	W	D*	L	GF	GA
(Colombia) 2017	Group stage	2nd - NZ^{1}	3	1	1	1	8	4
(Brazil) 2018	Group stage	2nd - NZ^{1}	4	3	1	0	15	6
(Ecuador) 2019	Champions	1st - NZ^{1}	4	4	0	0	15	5
(Brazil) 2023	Group stage	3rd - NZ^{1}	4	2	0	2	9	8
(Brazil) 2024	Group stage	2nd - NZ^{1}	4	2	1	1	9	4
Total	Champions	5/5	19	12	3	4	56	27

^{1}North zone.

==== Futsal Confederations Cup ====
Year	Round	Position	Pld	W	D*	L	GF	GA
(History of Libya under Muammar Gaddafi) Libya 2009	did not Enter							
Brazil 2013	Runners-up	2nd	4	2	0	2	10	11
Kuwait 2014	did not Enter							
Total	Runners-up	1/3	3	2	0	1	9	7

==== Grand Prix de Futsal ====
Year	Round	Position	Pld	W	D*	L	GF	GA
Brazil 2005	Runners-up	2nd	4	3	0	1	10	7
Brazil 2006	did not Enter							
Brazil 2007	did not Enter							
Brazil 2008	Quarter-Finals	6th	4	2	0	2	10	7
Brazil 2009	did not Enter							
Brazil 2010	did not Enter							
Brazil 2011	did not Enter							
Brazil 2013	did not Enter							
Brazil 2014	Runners-up	2nd	4	2	0	2	12	16
Brazil 2015	Third Place	3rd	5	3	0	2	9	11
Brazil 2018	did not enter							
Total	Runners-up	4/11	17	10	0	7	41	41

== Colombia national under-20 futsal team ==
The Colombia national under-20 futsal team participates in FIFA' South American Under-20 Futsal Championship since its first edition in 2004. The best result of the team is to reach the final in four editions (three consecutive times in 2010, 2013 and 2014 and then again in 2024). Since 2017, they participate in the CONMEBOL Futsal Evolution League.

=== FIFA ===
==== South American Under-20 Futsal Championship ====
*Draws include knockout matches decided on penalty kicks.
**Gold background colour indicates that the tournament was won.
***Red border colour indicates tournament was held on home soil.

Champions Runners-up Third Place Fourth place

Year	Round	Position	Pld	W	D*	L	GF	GA
(Brazil) 2004	First Round	6th	4	1	0	3	10	14
(Venezuela) 2006	First Round	6th	3	1	0	2	8	7
(Colombia) 2008	Fourth place	4th	5	2	1	2	14	13
(Colombia) 2010	Runners-up	2nd	6	3	2	1	20	14
(Venezuela) 2013	Runners-up	2nd	5	2	3	0	12	11
(Brazil) 2014	Runners-up	2nd	6	5	1	0	20	6
(Uruguay) 2016	First Round	7th	4	1	1	2	9	14
(Peru) 2018	Fifth place	5th	5	3	0	2	12	13
(Venezuela) 2022	Third place	3rd	6	4	0	2	14	14
(Peru) 2024	Runners-up	2nd	6	3	0	3	16	10
Total	Runners-up	10/10	50	25	8	17	135	116

==== CONMEBOL Futsal Evolution League ====
Year	Round	Position	Pld	W	D*	L	GF	GA
(Colombia) 2017	Group stage	2nd - NZ^{1}	3	2	0	1	11	7
(Brazil) 2018	Group stage	2nd - NZ^{1}	4	3	1	0	18	7
(Ecuador) 2019	Group stage	2nd - NZ^{1}	4	3	0	1	17	10
(Brazil) 2023	Group stage	4th - NZ^{1}	4	1	0	3	12	13
(Brazil) 2024	Group stage	2nd - NZ^{1}	4	2	2	0	12	4
Total	Runners-up	5/5	19	11	3	5	70	41

^{1}North zone.

=== AMF ===
==== AMF Under-20 Futsal World Cup ====
Year	Round	Position	Pld	W	D*	L	GF	GA
(Chile) 2014	Third place	3rd	6	5	0	1	52	4
(Colombia) 2018	Quarter-finals	5nd	5	4	0	1	45	6
(Catalonia) 2024	Champions	1st	6	5	1	0	33	6
Total	Champions	3/3	17	14	1	2	130	16

== Colombia national under-17 futsal team ==
=== FIFA ===
==== South American Under-17 Futsal Championship ====
*Draws include knockout matches decided on penalty kicks.
**Gold background colour indicates that the tournament was won.
***Red border colour indicates tournament was held on home soil.

Champions Runners-up Third Place Fourth place

Year	Round	Position	Pld	W	D*	L	GF	GA
(Brazil) 2016	Did not enter							
(Paraguay) 2018	Third place	3rd	6	3	2	1	18	11
(Paraguay) 2022	Fourth place	4th	6	3	0	3	10	14
(Paraguay) 2024	Ninth place	9th	5	2	0	3	11	9
Total	Third place	3/4	17	8	2	7	39	34

=== AMF ===
==== AMF Under-17 Futsal World Cup ====
Year	Round	Position	Pld	W	D*	L	GF	GA
(Paraguay) 2016	First place	1st	7	5	2	0	26	8
(Paraguay) 2024	First place	1st	6	6	0	0	38	8
Total	First place	2/2	13	11	2	0	64	16

== Honours ==
=== FIFA ===
- FIFA Futsal World Cup:
  - Fourth place (1): 2012
- Copa América:
  - Fourth place (2): 2011, 2015
- Futsal Confederations Cup:
  - Runners-up (1): 2013
- Grand Prix de Futsal:
  - Runners-up (2): 2005, 2014
  - Third place (1): 2015
- Bolivarian Games:
  - Champions (3): 2009 Sucre, 2017 Santa Marta, 2022 Valledupar
  - Runners-up (1): 2013 Trujillo
  - Third place (2): 2024 Ayacucho, 2025 Ayacucho-Lima
- South American Games:
  - Champions (1): 2018 Cochabamba
  - Third place (3): 2010 Medellín, 2014 Santiago, 2022 Asunción

=== AMF ===
- AMF Futsal World Cup:
  - Champions (3): 2000, 2011, 2015
  - Runners-up (2): 1994, 2003
  - Third place (1): 2007
  - Fourth place (1): 1982
- South American Futsal Championship:
  - Champions (2): 2014, 2025
  - Runners-up (1): 1998
  - Third place (1): 1977
- Pan-American Futsal Championship:
  - Champions (2): 1990, 1993
  - Runners-up (1): 1996
  - Third place (2): 1984, 1999
- World Games:
  - Champions (1): 2013 Cali

== See also ==
- Colombia women's national futsal team
