= 2022 Copa América de Futsal =

CONMEBOL Copa América de Futsal Paraguay 2022

Tournament details
- Host country: Paraguay
- City: Asunción
- Dates: 29 January – 6 February
- Teams: 10 (from 1 confederation)
- Venue: SND Arena

Final positions
- Champions: Argentina (3rd title)
- Runners-up: Paraguay
- Third place: Brazil
- Fourth place: Colombia

Tournament statistics
- Matches played: 27
- Goals scored: 125 (4.63 per match)
- Top scorer(s): (Paraguay) Hugo Martínez (Peru) Sebastián Obando (5 goals each)

The 2022 CONMEBOL Copa América de Futsal was the 13th edition of the Copa América de Futsal, the international futsal championship under FIFA rules organised by CONMEBOL for the men's national teams of South America. It was held in Asunción, Paraguay from 29 January to 6 February 2022.

The tournament was originally scheduled to be held in Rio de Janeiro, Brazil. However, on 27 December 2021 the Brazilian Football Confederation asked CONMEBOL to transfer the event to Paraguay because of the sanitary restrictions imposed in Brazil due to the COVID-19 pandemic. CONMEBOL confirmed the change to Paraguay on 4 January 2022, maintaining the same dates. Planned to be held in 2021, the tournament was postponed until 2022 due to the COVID-19 pandemic and it marked the return of the Copa América de Futsal after four years as the 2019 edition ended up being cancelled.

Brazil were the defending champions, having won their tenth title in 2017, but were eliminated by Argentina in the semi-finals leading to the third place match against Colombia, which they won by 3–0 score. Argentina won their third title after defeating Paraguay 1–0 in the final.

== Teams ==
All ten CONMEBOL member national teams entered the tournament.

Team	Appearance	Previous best top-4 performance
Argentina	13th	Champions (2003, 2015)
Bolivia	6th	Fourth place (2000)
Brazil (holders)	13th	Champions (1992, 1995, 1996, 1997, 1998, 1999, 2000, 2008, 2011, 2017)
Chile	8th	None
Colombia	7th	Fourth place (2011, 2015)
Ecuador	7th	Fourth place (1992)
Paraguay (hosts)	13th	Runners-up (1998, 1999, 2015)
Peru	7th	None
Uruguay	11th	Runners-up (1996, 2008)
Venezuela	7th	None

== Venue ==
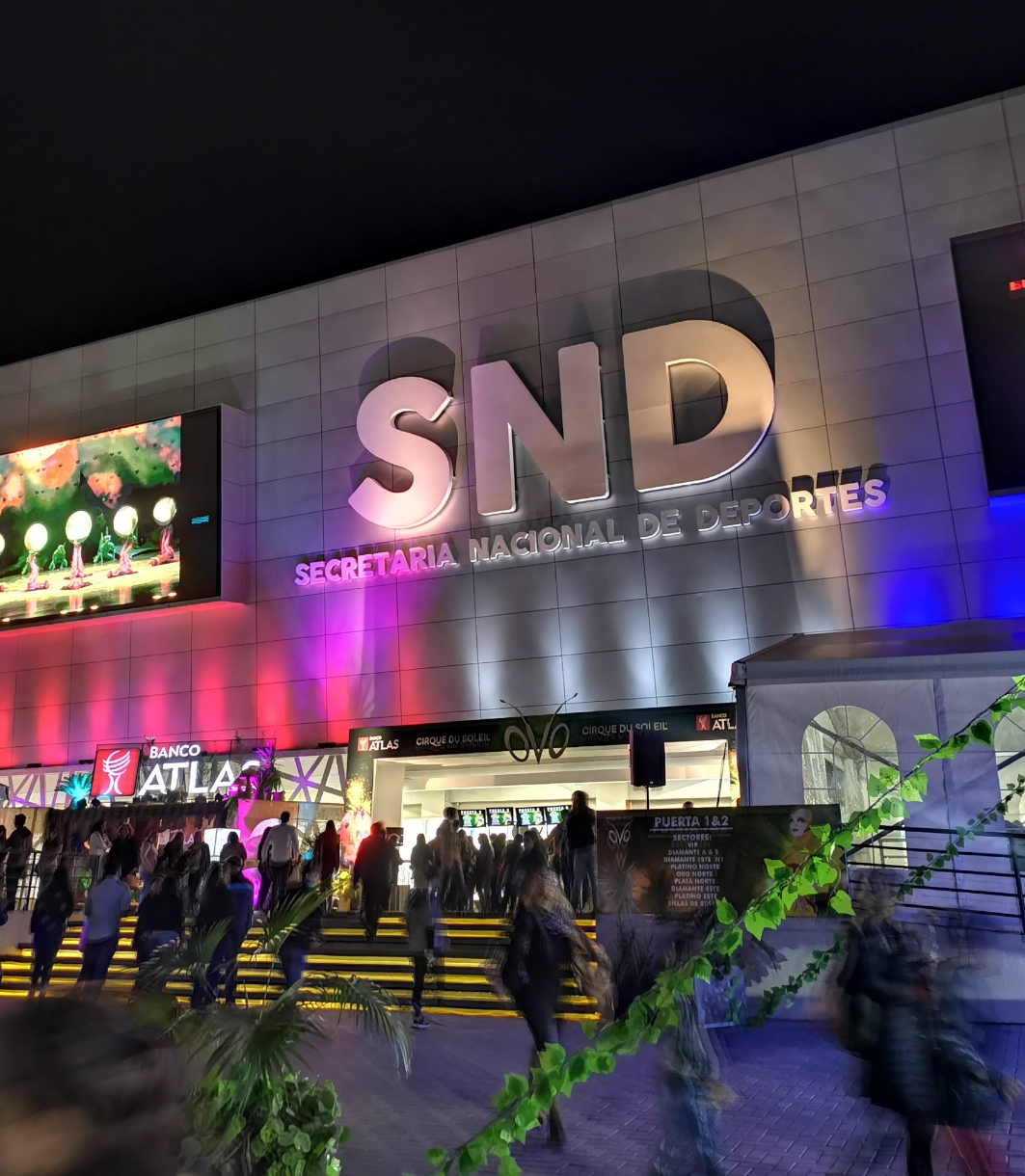
The SND Arena hosted the matches.

Rio de Janeiro, Brazil was originally named as host city of the tournament at the CONMEBOL Council meeting held on 27 October 2021. with the Barra Olympic Park as venue of the matches. However, on 27 December 2021 the Brazilian Football Confederation sent a letter to CONMEBOL requesting to transfer the tournament to Paraguay because it could not obtain the exceptions to the sanitary measures adopted by the Brazilian government related to the COVID-19 pandemic for the participating delegations. On 4 January 2022 CONMEBOL confirmed Asunción, Paraguay as the new host city through a note sent to its member associations.

All matches took place at the SND Arena owned by the National Secretary of Sports of Paraguay and located in the Hipódromo neighbourhood in Asunción.

== Draw ==
The draw of the tournament was held on 20 December 2021, 14:30 PYST (UTC−3), at the CONMEBOL Convention Centre in Luque, Paraguay. The hosts (at that moment) and holders, Brazil, and the previous tournament's runners-up, Argentina were seeded and assigned to the head of the groups A and B respectively. The remaining eight teams were split into four "pairing pots" (Paraguay–Uruguay, Colombia–Venezuela, Bolivia–Ecuador, Peru–Chile) based on the final placement they reached in the previous edition of the tournament (shown in brackets).

Pot 1	Pot 2	Pot 3	Pot 4
Paraguay (3); Uruguay (4)	Colombia (5); Venezuela (6)	Bolivia (7); Ecuador (8)	Peru (9); Chile (10)

From each pot, the first team drawn was placed into Group A and the second team drawn was placed into Group B. In both groups, teams from pot 1 were allocated in position 2, teams from pot 2 in position 3, teams from pot 3 in position 4 and teams from pot 4 in position 5.

The draw resulted in the following groups:

Group A
Pos	Team
A1	Brazil
A2	Uruguay
A3	Colombia
A4	Ecuador
A5	Chile

Group B
Pos	Team
B1	Argentina
B2	Paraguay
B3	Venezuela
B4	Bolivia
B5	Peru

== Match officials ==
On 28 December 2021, CONMEBOL informed to its member associations the referees appointed for the tournament.

Association	Referees
Argentina	Darío Santamaría and Bettina Cingari
Bolivia	Henry Gutierrez
Brazil	Felipe Ventura, Gean Telles, and Ricardo Messa
Chile	Valeria Palma, Christian Espíndola, and Rodrigo Concha
Colombia	Yuri García
Ecuador	Jonathan Herbas
Paraguay	José Ocampo and Bill Villalba
Peru	Rolly Rojas and Mario Espichán
Uruguay	Andrés Martínez and Daniel Rodríguez
Venezuela	Junior Patiño

== Squads ==
Each national team had to submit a squad of at least 10 and up to 14 players, including a minimum of two goalkeepers (Regulations Article 29).

== Group stage ==
The top two teams of each group advance to the semi-finals.

Tiebreakers

The ranking of teams in the group stage is determined as follows (Regulations article 19 and 20):

1. Points obtained in all group matches (three points for a win, one for a draw, none for a defeat);
2. Goal difference in the matches played between the teams in question;
3. Number of goals scored in the matches played between the teams in question;
4. Goal difference in all group matches;
5. Number of goals scored in all group matches;
6. Points obtained in the matches played between the teams in question;
7. Fewer red cards received
8. Fewer yellow cards received
9. Drawing of lots.

All match times listed are in PYST (UTC−3), as listed by CONMEBOL.

=== Group A ===
Pos	Team	Pld	W	D	L	GF	GA	GD	Pts	Qualification
1	Brazil	4	4	0	0	14	3	+11	12	Semi-finals
2	Colombia	4	3	0	1	12	7	+5	9	Semi-finals
3	Uruguay	4	2	0	2	8	6	+2	6	Fifth place play-off
4	Ecuador	4	1	0	3	8	18	−10	3	Seventh place play-off
5	Chile	4	0	0	4	5	13	−8	0	Ninth place play-off

Source: CONMEBOL
Rules for classification: Group stage tiebreakers
29 January 2022
13:00

Chile	1–3	Colombia
Cristian Arredondo 23'	Report CONMEBOL; Report APF	Brayan Zapata 29', 32'; Yulian Diaz 38'

SND Arena, Asunción
Referee: Bill Villalba (Paraguay) and José Ocampo (Paraguay)
29 January 2022
17:00

Brazil	5–1	Ecuador
Bruno 8'; Pito 9'; João Victor 15'; Daniel 18'; Bruno Taffy 34'	Report CONMEBOL; Report APF	Bryan Montaño 33'

SND Arena, Asunción
Referee: Mario Espichán (Peru) and Rolly Rojas (Peru)

30 January 2022
11:00

Ecuador	4–2	Chile
Jordan Mercado 16'; Dálember Segura 25'; Sindulfo Estacio 26'; Jimmy Espinales 39'	Report CONMEBOL; Report APF	Nicolás Lagos 32'; Joel González 39'

SND Arena, Asunción
Referee: Henry Gutierrez (Bolivia) and Junior Patiño (Venezuela)
30 January 2022
15:00

Uruguay	0–4	Colombia
	Report CONMEBOL; Report APF	Felipe Echavarría 2'; José Tangarife 16'; Angellot Caro 24'; Brayan Zapata 34'

SND Arena, Asunción
Referee: Darío Santamaría (Argentina) and Bettina Cingari (Argentina)

31 January 2022
11:00

Ecuador	0–6	Uruguay
	Report CONMEBOL; Report APF	Brandon Diaz 14'; Juan Custodio 23'; Nicolás Ordoqui 25'; Mathías Fernández 29'; Luciano Cosentino 34'; Agustín Sosa 38'

SND Arena, Asunción
Referee: José Ocampo (Paraguay) and Bill Villalba (Paraguay)
31 January 2022
15:00

Chile	2–4	Brazil
Renato Martínez-Conde 17'; Alan Morán 28'	Report CONMEBOL; Report APF	Ferrão 16'; Marlon Araújo 19', 34'; Pito 21'

SND Arena, Asunción
Referee: Rolly Rojas (Peru) and Mario Espichán (Peru)

2 February 2022
11:00

Uruguay	2–0	Chile
Richard Catardo 11'; Juan Custodio 12'	Report CONMEBOL; Report APF

SND Arena, Asunción
Referee: Henry Gutierrez (Bolivia) and Bettina Cingari (Argentina)
2 February 2022
15:00

Colombia	0–3	Brazil
	Report CONMEBOL; Report APF	Ferrão 17'; Felipe Valério 34'; Rafa Santos 37'

SND Arena, Asunción
Referee: Darío Santamaría (Argentina) and Bill Villalba (Paraguay)

3 February 2022
13:00

Colombia	5–3	Ecuador
Felipe Echavarría 3', 19', 32'; Angellot Caro 5'; Harrison Santos 9'	Report CONMEBOL; Report APF	Jordan Mercado 4', 10'; Dálember Segura 11'

SND Arena, Asunción
Referee: Henry Gutierrez (Bolivia) and Junior Patiño (Venezuela)
3 February 2022
17:00

Brazil	2–0	Uruguay
Pito 7', 17'	Report CONMEBOL; Report APF

SND Arena, Asunción
Referee: Rolly Rojas (Peru) and José Ocampo (Paraguay)

=== Group B ===
Pos	Team	Pld	W	D	L	GF	GA	GD	Pts	Qualification
1	Paraguay (H)	4	3	1	0	16	7	+9	10	Semi-finals
2	Argentina	4	3	1	0	12	6	+6	10	Semi-finals
3	Venezuela	4	2	0	2	10	10	0	6	Fifth place play-off
4	Bolivia	4	1	0	3	6	12	−6	3	Seventh place play-off
5	Peru	4	0	0	4	7	16	−9	0	Ninth place play-off

Source: CONMEBOL
Rules for classification: Group stage tiebreakers
(H) Hosts
29 January 2022
11:00

Peru	2–3	Venezuela
Samuel Angulo 24'; Jordi Rivera 37'	Report CONMEBOL; Report APF	Wilson Francia 8'; Andrés Terán 30'; Carlos Sanz 34'

SND Arena, Asunción
Referee: Yuri García (Colombia) and Jonathan Herbas (Ecuador)
29 January 2021
15:00

Argentina	2–1	Bolivia
Pablo Taborda 1', 27'	Report CONMEBOL; Report APF	Miguel Padilla 3'

SND Arena, Asunción
Referee: Christian Espíndola (Chile) and Rodrigo Concha (Chile)

30 January 2022
13:00

Bolivia	4–3	Peru
Miguel Padilla 3'; Raúl Ardaya 14'; Carlos Ramos 34'; José Herrera 38'	Report CONMEBOL; Report APF	Sebastián Obando 17'; Hugo Barrantes 21'; Xavier Tavera 25'

SND Arena, Asunción
Referee: Daniel Rodríguez (Uruguay) and Valeria Palma (Chile)
30 January 2022
17:00

Paraguay	4–3	Venezuela
Juan Gómez 12'; Hugo Martínez 23', 28'; Francisco Martínez 39'	Report CONMEBOL; Report APF	Rafael Morillo 13', 37', 40'

SND Arena, Asunción
Referee: Gean Telles (Brazil) and Felipe Ventura (Brazil)

31 January 2022
13:00

Bolivia	0–4	Paraguay
	Report CONMEBOL; Report APF	Hugo Martínez 2'; Damián Mareco 5'; Francisco Martínez 21'; Vander Méndez 28'

SND Arena, Asunción
Referee: Andrés Martínez (Uruguay) and Yuri Garcia (Colombia)
31 January 2022
17:00

Peru	1–4	Argentina
Sebastián Obando 40'	Report CONMEBOL; Report APF	Andrés Geraghty 7'; Sebastián Corso 8'; Maximiliano Rescia 11'; Constantino Vaporaki 35'

SND Arena, Asunción
Referee: Felipe Ventura (Brazil) and Ricardo Messa (Brazil)

2 February 2022
13:00

Paraguay	5–1	Peru
Arnaldo Báez 10'; Richard Rejala 13'; Juan Gómez Salas 19'; Hugo Martínez 21'; Javier Salas 34'	Report CONMEBOL; Report APF	Sebastián Obando 2'

SND Arena, Asunción
Referee: Ricardo Messa (Brazil) and Andrés Martinez (Uruguay)
2 February 2022
17:00

Venezuela	1–3	Argentina
Wilson Francia 22'	Report CONMEBOL; Report APF	Constantino Vaporaki 15'; Pablo Taborda 17'; Matías Edelstein 18'

SND Arena, Asunción
Referee: Valeria Palma (Chile) and Gean Telles (Brazil)

3 February 2022
11:00

Venezuela	3–1	Bolivia
Henry Gutiérrez 19', 35'; Oscar Fernández 28'	Report CONMEBOL; Report APF	Miguel Padilla 31'

SND Arena, Asunción
Referee: Rodrigo Concha (Chile) and Johnathan Herbas (Ecuador)
3 February 2022
15:00

Argentina	3–3	Paraguay
Matías Edelstein 18', 27'; Sebastián Corso 33'	Report CONMEBOL; Report APF	Arnaldo Báez 4'; Hugo Martínez 14'; Francisco Martínez 19'

SND Arena, Asunción
Referee: Daniel Rodríguez (Uruguay) and Christian Espíndola (Chile)

== Final stage ==
In the final stage, if a match is tied after the regular playing time (Regulations article 21):

- In the semi-finals and final, extra time would be played (two periods of five minutes each). If still tied after extra time, the match would be decided by a penalty shoot-out.
- In the play-offs for third to tenth place, extra time would not be played, and the match would be decided by a penalty shoot-out.

All match times listed are in PYST (UTC−3), as listed by CONMEBOL.

=== Bracket ===
Semi-finals
5 February
Brazil	3 (1)
Argentina (p)	3 (2)
5 February
Paraguay	4
Colombia	2

Final
6 February
Argentina	1
Paraguay	0
Third place play-off
6 February
Brazil	3
Colombia	0

Ninth place play-off
5 February
Chile	2
Peru	3

Seventh place play-off
5 February
Ecuador (p)	2 (7)
Bolivia	2 (6)

Fifth place play-off
6 February
Uruguay (p)	1 (7)
Venezuela	1 (6)

=== Semi-finals ===
5 February 2022
15:30

Paraguay	4–2	Colombia
Arnaldo Báez 17'; Francisco Martínez 29'; Damián Mareco 34'; Juan Gómez Salas 39'	Report CONMEBOL; Report APF	Camilo Sánchez 12', 37'

SND Arena, Asunción
Referee: Christian Espíndola (Chile)

5 February 2022
18:30

Brazil	3–3 (a.e.t.)	Argentina
Ferrão 11' (pen.); Matheus Rodrigues 27'; Cristian Borruto 36' (o.g.)	Report CONMEBOL; Report APF	Lucas Bolo 7'; Ángel Claudino 30'; Leandro Cuzzolino 34'
Penalties
Ferrão (penalty missed); Pito (penalty missed); Rafa Santos (penalty scored); Bruno Taffy (penalty missed); Marcênio (penalty missed)	1–2	(penalty missed) Lucas Bolo; (penalty scored) Matías Edelstein; (penalty scored) Ángel Claudino; (penalty missed) Pablo Taborda

SND Arena, Asunción
Referee: Daniel Rodríguez (Uruguay)

=== Ninth place play-off ===
5 February 2022
11:00

Chile	2–3	Peru
Nicolás Chacón 1'; Joel González 27'	Report CONMEBOL; Report APF	Sebastián Obando 6', 39'; Manuel Millares 32'

SND Arena, Asunción
Referee: Jonathan Herbas (Ecuador)

=== Seventh place play-off ===
5 February 2022
13:15

Ecuador	2–2 (a.e.t.)	Bolivia
Jerson Nazareno 35'; Dálember Segura 39'	Report CONMEBOL; Report APF	Rómer Herrera 13'; Saúl Gareca 29'
Penalties
	7–6

SND Arena, Asunción
Referee: Junior Patiño (Venezuela)

=== Fifth place play-off ===
6 February 2022
11:45

Uruguay	1–1	Venezuela
Alejandro Aunchayna 22'	Report CONMEBOL; Report APF	Alfredo Vidal 39'
Penalties
Nicolás Ordoqui (penalty missed); Richard Catardo (penalty scored); Juan Custodio (penalty scored); Luciano Cosentino (penalty scored); Ignacio Salgués (penalty scored); Federico Fedele (penalty scored); Mathías Fernández (penalty scored); Alejandro Aunchayna (penalty scored)	7–6	(penalty scored) Carlos Sanz; (penalty scored) Jesús Viamonte; (penalty scored) Jean Trujillo; (penalty scored) Henry Gutiérrez; (penalty missed) Rafael Morillo; (penalty scored) Wilson Escalona; (penalty scored) Alexander Moreno; (penalty missed) Andrés Terán

SND Arena, Asunción
Referee: Felipe Ventura (Brazil)

=== Third place play-off ===
6 February 2022
14:00

Brazil	3–0	Colombia
Ferrão 14'; Bruno Ramos 17'; João Victor 31'	Report CONMEBOL; Report APF

SND Arena, Asunción
Referee: Darío Santamaría (Argentina)

=== Final ===
6 February 2022
17:00

Argentina	1–0	Paraguay
Alan Brandi 18'	Report CONMEBOL; Report APF

SND Arena, Asunción
Referee: Gean Telles (Brazil)

== Notes ==
1. Replaced Andrés Peña Garcia
2. Replaced Anelize Schultz
