= 2022 South American Under-20 Futsal Championship =

CONMEBOL Sub 20 Futsal Venezuela 2022
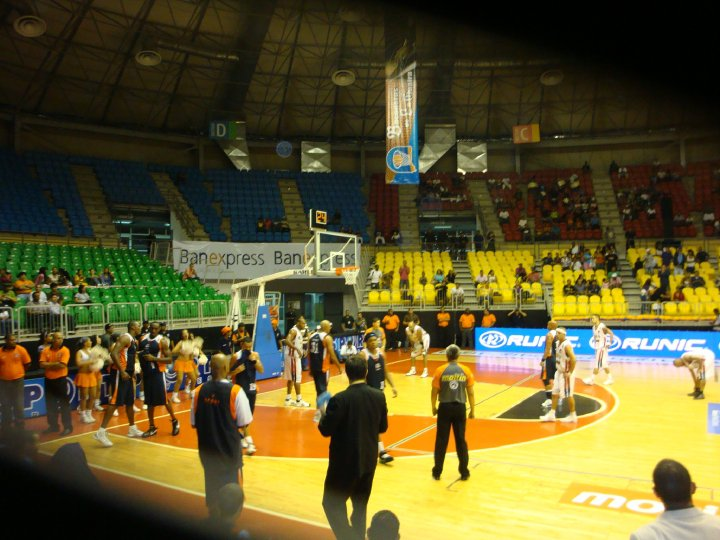
- All games were played at José María Vargas Dome.

Tournament details
- Host country: Venezuela
- City: La Guaira
- Dates: 9–17 September 2023
- Teams: 10 (from 1 confederation)
- Venue: 1 (in 1 host city)

Final positions
- Champions: Brazil (8th title)
- Runners-up: Argentina
- Third place: Colombia
- Fourth place: Chile

Tournament statistics
- Matches played: 27
- Goals scored: 136 (5.04 per match)

The 2022 South American Under-20 Futsal Championship, stylized as CONMEBOL SUB20 Futsal 2022, was the 9th edition of the South American Under-20 Futsal Championship (Spanish: Campeonato Sudamericano Sub-20 de Futsal), the biennial international youth futsal championship organised by the CONMEBOL for the men's under-20 national teams of South America. The tournament was held in La Guaira State, Venezuela between 9–17 September 2023.

== Teams ==
All ten CONMEBOL member national teams entered the tournament.

- Argentina
- Bolivia
- Brazil (title holders)
- Chile
- Colombia
- Ecuador
- Paraguay
- Peru
- Uruguay
- Venezuela (hosts)

== Venues ==
All matches were played in one venue: Domo José María Vargas.

== Group stage ==
All times are local, VET (UTC−4).

=== Group A ===
Pos	Team	Pld	W	D	L	GF	GA	GD	Pts	Qualification
1	Argentina	4	3	0	1	12	3	+9	9	Semi-finals
2	Colombia	4	3	0	1	11	8	+3	9	Semi-finals
3	Venezuela (H)	4	3	0	1	10	6	+4	9	Fifth place play-off
4	Uruguay	4	1	0	3	5	11	−6	3	Seventh place play-off
5	Ecuador	4	0	0	4	4	14	−10	0	Ninth place play-off

Source: CONMEBOL.com
(H) Hosts

=== Group B ===
Pos	Team	Pld	W	D	L	GF	GA	GD	Pts	Qualification
1	Brazil	4	4	0	0	33	3	+30	12	Semi-finals
2	Chile	4	2	1	1	12	10	+2	7	Semi-finals
3	Peru	4	2	0	2	8	23	−15	6	Fifth place play-off
4	Paraguay	4	1	0	3	9	12	−3	3	Seventh place play-off
5	Bolivia	4	0	1	3	5	19	−14	1	Ninth place play-off

Source: CONMEBOL.com

== Knockout stage ==
=== Bracket ===
Semi-finals
16 September
Argentina	3
Chile	1
16 September
Brazil	4
Colombia	0

Final
17 September
Argentina	0
Brazil	1
Third place
17 September
Chile	2
Colombia	3

Fifth place
17 September
Venezuela	4 (1)
Peru (p)	4 (3)

Seventh place
16 September
Uruguay	0
Paraguay	4

Ninth place
16 September
Ecuador	1
Bolivia	0

=== Semi-finals ===
16 September 2023
16:30

Argentina	3–1	Chile

Domo José María Vargas, Maiquetía
16 September 2023
19:00

Brazil	4–0	Colombia

Domo José María Vargas, Maiquetía

=== Ninth place play-off ===
16 September 2023
12:00

Ecuador	1–0	Colombia

Domo José María Vargas, Maiquetía

=== Seventh place play-off ===
16 September 2023
14:00

Uruguay	0–4	Paraguay

Domo José María Vargas, Maiquetía

=== Fifth place play-off ===
17 September 2023
12:00

Venezuela	4-4	Peru
Penalties
	1-3

Domo José María Vargas, Maiquetía

=== Third place play-off ===
17 September 2023
14:00

Chile	2-3	Colombia

Domo José María Vargas, Maiquetía

=== Final ===
17 September 2023
17:00

Argentina	0-1	Brazil

Domo José María Vargas, Maiquetía

CONMEBOL Under-20 Futsal 2022
champions

Brazil
8th title

== Final standings ==
Rank	Team
1	Brazil
2	Argentina
3	Colombia
4	Chile
5	Peru
6	Venezuela
7	Paraguay
8	Uruguay
9	Ecuador
10	Bolivia
