= Frank Carrasco =

Chilean futsal player

Personal information
- Full name: Frank Jordan Carrasco Kornich
- Date of birth: 5 October 1992 (age 34)
- Place of birth: Santiago, Chile
- Height: 1.74 m (5 ft 9 in)
- Position: Winger

Youth career
- Colo-Colo (football)

Senior career*
| Years | Team | Apps | (Gls) |
| 2010–? | Colo-Colo | | |
| 2012 | Colo-Colo B (football) | 2 | (0) |
- Deportes Concepción
- Cobresal
- Everton
| 2017 | Boca San Pablo | | |
| 2018–2019 | Universidad de Chile | | |
| 2020 | Hebraica Futsal | | |
| 2021–2022 | Universidad de Chile | | |

International career
| 2013 | Chile U20 | | |
| 2015–2022 | Chile | | |
- * Club domestic league appearances and goals

Frank Jordan Carrasco Kornich (born 5 October 1992) is a Chilean futsal player who plays as a winger. He has represented the Chile national team and played in the Argentine Primera División. .

== Career ==
A youth product of the Colo-Colo football team, playing also for Colo-Colo B in the 2012 Segunda División Profesional, Carrasco began to play for the futsal team in 2010. Subsequently, he played for the futsal teams of Deportes Concepción, Cobresal, Everton and Boca San Pablo before joining the Universidad de Chile futsal team in 2018. With them, he won both the 2018 Torneo Apertura and the Copa de Campeones against Deportes Melipilla, then the Torneo Clausura champions, qualifying to the 2019 Copa Libertadores.

In 2020, he moved to Argentine and joined Hebraica Futsal, becoming the first Chilean to play in the Argentine Primera División.

The next year, he rejoined Universidad de Chile, serving also as coordinator and logistics manager of the team. They took part in the 2021 Copa Libertadores.

=== Seven-a-side football ===
In 2022, Carrasco also played seven-a-side football for clubs such as Vecchia Signora and Embajada Las Américas from Santiago.

== International career ==
In 2013, Carrasco represented Chile at under-20 level in the South American Championship, reaching the fourth place.

At senior level, he has taken part with the Chile national team in many tournaments and friendlies such as the 2015 Copa América, the South American Futsal League, a tour in Morocco, the 2022 Copa América, among others.
