= Alex Valdés =

Chilean footballer

Personal information
- Full name: Alex Joel Valdés Voissin
- Date of birth: 8 August 2002 (age 24)
- Place of birth: Cerro Navia, Santiago, Chile
- Height: 1.80 m (5 ft 11 in)
- Position: Winger

Team information
- Current team: Ñublense

Youth career
- Santiago Morning (futsal)
- Santiago Morning

Senior career*
Years	Team	Apps	(Gls)
2022	Santiago Morning	18	(0)
2023–	Ñublense	33	(3)
2025	→ Cobreloa (loan)	32	(4)

International career
2018	Chile U20 (futsal)		
- * Club domestic league appearances and goals as of 21 December 2025

Alex Joel Valdés Voissin (born 8 August 2002) is a Chilean footballer who plays as a winger for Ñublense.

== Club career ==
Born in Cerro Navia commune, Santiago de Chile, Valdés started his career with Santiago Morning in 2022.

In January 2023, Valdés signed with Ñublense in the Chilean Primera División and made his debut scoring the first goal in the 3–2 win against Magallanes on 27 January. Later, he took part in both the 2023 Copa Libertadores and the 2023 Copa Sudamericana.

In January 2025, Valdés moved on loan to Cobreloa on a deal for a season.

== International career ==
As a player of Santiago Mornihg, Valdés represented the Chile national futsal under-20 team at the 2018 South American Championship.
