= Joel González (futsal player) =

Argentine-Chilean futsal player

Personal information
- Full name: Joel Esteban González Ochoa
- Date of birth: 17 September 1994 (age 32)
- Place of birth: Ushuaia, Argentina
- Position: Winger

Team information
- Current team: Gimnasia La Plata

Youth career
- Ateneo

Senior career*
Years	Team	Apps	(Gls)
- Ateneo
2019	Ushuaia (city team)		
2020	Barracas Central		
2020–2022	Ateneo		
2022	Newell's Old Boys		
2023–	Gimnasia La Plata		

International career
2021–	Chile		
- * Club domestic league appearances and goals

Joel Esteban González Ochoa (born 17 September 1994) is an Argentine-Chilean futsal player who plays as a winger for Gimnasia La Plata in the Argentine Primera División and the Chile national team.

== Career ==
Born in Ushuaia, Argentina, González began his career with the futsal team of Ateneo FC in his hometown. He also represented the Ushuaia city team in 2019, winning the Patagónico tournament.

In 2020, he had a brief stint with Barracas Central.

Back to Ateneo, he switched to Newell's Old Boys in July 2022.

In 2023, he joined Gimnasia La Plata in the Argentine top division .

== International career ==
Due to his dual Argentine-Chilean nationality, he was in contact with the coach Vicente De Luise to join the Chile national team before 2020, but he could be called up just in 2021 due to COVID-19 pandemic. Since then, he has been a permanent member of the squad in events such as the 2022 Copa América, a tour in Argentina and a tour in Uruguay.

He was included in the 2024 Copa América.

== Personal life ==
González holds dual Argentine-Chilean nationality since his mother is Chilean.
