= 2013 Futsal Confederations Cup =

Tournament details
- Host country: Brazil
- Dates: 5 December – 13 December
- Teams: 4 (from 2 confederations)
- Venue(s): 1 (in 1 host city)

Final positions
- Champions: Brazil (1st title)
- Runners-up: Colombia
- Third place: Chile
- Fourth place: Croatia

Tournament statistics
- Matches played: 7
- Goals scored: 35 (5 per match)

The 2013 Futsal Confederations Cup, which was called the Intercontinental Cup for this tournament, was held in Brazil.

Having participated in 2013 Grand Prix de Futsal, many continental championships are tired of playing another tournament, so Colombia gave up their right of hosting this tournament. Only some invitees come to Brazil.

== Participating teams ==
| Team | Confederation | Qualification |
|---|---|---|
| Brazil | CONMEBOL | Host and 2012 FIFA Futsal World Cup winners |
| Chile | CONMEBOL | Invitee |
| Colombia | CONMEBOL | Invitee |
| Croatia | UEFA | Invitee |

== Group stage ==
| Team | Pld | W | D | L | GF | GA | GD | Pts |
|---|---|---|---|---|---|---|---|---|
| Brazil | 3 | 3 | 0 | 0 | 15 | 1 | +14 | 9 |
| Colombia | 3 | 2 | 0 | 1 | 9 | 7 | +2 | 6 |
| Chile | 3 | 0 | 1 | 2 | 3 | 10 | −7 | 1 |
| Croatia | 3 | 0 | 1 | 2 | 3 | 12 | −9 | 1 |

5 December 2013

| Croatia | 2 – 4 | Colombia |

5 December 2013

| Brazil | 4 – 1 | Chile |

6 December 2013

| Chile | 1 – 1 | Croatia |

6 December 2013

| Brazil | 4 – 0 | Colombia |

7 December 2013

| Colombia | 5 – 1 | Chile |

7 December 2013

| Brazil | 7 – 0 | Croatia |

== Final Stage ==
8 December 2013

| Brazil | 4 – 1 | Colombia |

== Honors ==
2013 Futsal Continental Cup

Brazil
First title
