= 2017 Copa América de Futsal =

CONMEBOL Copa América de Futsal Argentina 2017

Tournament details
- Host country: Argentina
- City: San Juan
- Dates: 5–12 April
- Teams: 10 (from 1 confederation)
- Venue: 1 (in 1 host city)

Final positions
- Champions: Brazil (10th title)
- Runners-up: Argentina
- Third place: Paraguay
- Fourth place: Uruguay

Tournament statistics
- Matches played: 27
- Goals scored: 183 (6.78 per match)
- Top scorer(s): (Argentina) Leandro Cuzzolino (Brazil) Deives Moraes (Paraguay) Wilson Veiga Neto (6 goals each)

The 2017 CONMEBOL Copa América de Futsal was the 12th edition of the Copa América de Futsal, the international futsal championship under FIFA rules organised by CONMEBOL for the men's national teams of South America. The tournament was held in San Juan, Argentina between 5–12 April 2017.

== Teams ==
All ten CONMEBOL member national teams entered the tournament.

Team	Appearance	Previous best top-4 performance
Argentina (hosts and holders)	12th	Champions (2003, 2015)
Bolivia	5th	Fourth place (2000)
Brazil	12th	Champions (1992, 1995, 1996, 1997, 1998, 1999, 2000, 2008, 2011)
Chile	7th	None
Colombia	5th	Fourth place (2011, 2015)
Ecuador	6th	Fourth place (1992)
Paraguay	12th	Runners-up (1998, 1999, 2015)
Peru	6th	None
Uruguay	11th	Runners-up (1996, 2008)
Venezuela	7th	None

== Venues ==
All matches are played in one venue: Estadio Aldo Cantoni in San Juan.

== Draw ==
The draw of the tournament was held on 30 March 2017, 14:30 ART (UTC−3), at the Sports Secretariat of the city of San Juan. The ten teams were drawn into two groups of five teams. The hosts and defending champions Argentina and the defending runners-up Paraguay were seeded into Groups A and B respectively, while the remaining teams were placed into four "pairing pots" according to their results in the 2015 Copa América de Futsal: Brazil–Colombia, Chile–Uruguay, Venezuela–Peru, Ecuador–Bolivia.

== Squads ==
Each team had to submit a squad of 14 players, including a minimum of two goalkeepers (Regulations Article 4.1).

== Match officials ==
A total of 16 referees were appointed for the tournament.

== Group stage ==
The top two teams of each group advance to the semi-finals, while the teams in third, fourth and fifth advance to the fifth place, seventh place, and ninth place play-offs respectively. The teams are ranked according to points (3 points for a win, 1 point for a draw, 0 points for a loss). If tied on points, tiebreakers are applied in the following order (Regulations Article 6.2):

1. Results in head-to-head matches between tied teams (points, goal difference, goals scored);
2. Goal difference in all matches;
3. Goals scored in all matches;
4. Drawing of lots.

All times are local, ART (UTC−3).

=== Group A ===
Pos	Team	Pld	W	D	L	GF	GA	GD	Pts	Qualification
1	Brazil	4	3	1	0	23	3	+20	10	Knockout stage
2	Argentina (H)	4	3	1	0	21	4	+17	10	Knockout stage
3	Venezuela	4	2	0	2	10	16	−6	6	Fifth place play-off
4	Bolivia	4	1	0	3	4	19	−15	3	Seventh place play-off
5	Chile	4	0	0	4	3	19	−16	0	Ninth place play-off

Source: CONMEBOL
(H) Hosts
5 April 2017
19:00

Chile	1–2	Venezuela
Pávez 26'	Report	Silva 34'; W. Francia 36'

Estadio Aldo Cantoni, San Juan
Referee: Mario Espichán (Peru), Roly Rojas (Peru)
5 April 2017
21:00

Argentina	6–1	Bolivia
C. Vaporaki 3', 27'; Cuzzolino 4', 19'; A. Vaporaki 6'; Villalva 38'	Report	Rojas 12'

Estadio Aldo Cantoni, San Juan
Referee: Elvis Peña (Paraguay), Carlos Martínez (Paraguay)

6 April 2017
19:00

Bolivia	0–9	Brazil
	Report	Arthur 4', 15'; Deives 9', 19'; Felipe 25', 32'; Marcel 28'; Alex 37'; Lino 39'

Estadio Aldo Cantoni, San Juan
Referee: Yuri García (Colombia), Hugo Camargo (Colombia)
6 April 2017
21:00

Argentina	8–2	Venezuela
Wilhelm 4'; Rescia 16'; C. Vaporaki 18'; Stazzone 19', 31'; Borruto 21'; Rosa 23'; Cuzzolino 36' (pen.)	Report	W. Francia 17'; Cabarcas 29'

Estadio Aldo Cantoni, San Juan
Referee: José Hernández (Ecuador), Andrés Martínez (Uruguay)

7 April 2017
19:00

Venezuela	3–1	Bolivia
Cabarcas 11' (pen.), 33'; Viamonte 21'	Report	Paz 23'

Estadio Aldo Cantoni, San Juan
Referee: Mario Espichán (Peru), Daniel Rodríguez (Uruguay)
7 April 2017
21:00

Brazil	8–0	Chile
Nenê 2'; Alex 8', 32'; Escobar 22' (o.g.); López 31' (o.g.); Lino 33'; Felipe 37'; Deives 38'	Report

Estadio Aldo Cantoni, San Juan
Referee: Carlos Martínez (Paraguay), Elvis Peña (Paraguay)

8 April 2017
20:00

Argentina	0–0	Brazil
	Report

Estadio Aldo Cantoni, San Juan
Referee: Daniel Rodríguez (Uruguay), Yuri García (Colombia)
8 April 2017
22:00

Chile	1–2	Bolivia
Hurtado 29'	Report	Paz 13', 22'

Estadio Aldo Cantoni, San Juan
Referee: Hugo Camargo (Colombia), Andrés Martínez (Uruguay)

9 April 2017
20:00

Brazil	6–3	Venezuela
Felipe 8'; Lino 13'; Marcel 15'; Daniel 21'; Rocha 34'; Deives 35' (pen.)	Report	Silva 4'; Preciado 11', 33'

Estadio Aldo Cantoni, San Juan
Referee: Roly Rojas (Peru), José Hernández (Ecuador)
9 April 2017
22:00

Argentina	7–1	Chile
Rosa 9'; A. Vaporaki 13'; Cuzzolino 18'; Basile 32'; Claudino 33', 39', 39'	Report	Vidal 36'

Estadio Aldo Cantoni, San Juan
Referee: Elvis Peña (Paraguay), Carlos Martínez (Paraguay)

=== Group B ===
Pos	Team	Pld	W	D	L	GF	GA	GD	Pts	Qualification
1	Uruguay	4	2	2	0	18	13	+5	8	Knockout stage
2	Paraguay	4	2	1	1	18	13	+5	7	Knockout stage
3	Colombia	4	1	2	1	20	15	+5	5	Fifth place play-off
4	Ecuador	4	1	1	2	8	18	−10	4	Seventh place play-off
5	Peru	4	1	0	3	14	19	−5	3	Ninth place play-off

Source: CONMEBOL
5 April 2017
15:00

Peru	3–6	Uruguay
Tavera 15'; Herrera 18'; Ramírez 24'	Report	Catardo 27'; Fedele 27'; De los Santos 33'; Salgués 34'; Ordoqui 37' (pen.); Sosa 38'

Estadio Aldo Cantoni, San Juan
Referee: Darío Santamaría (Argentina), Marcelo Bais (Argentina)
5 April 2017
17:00

Paraguay	3–0	Ecuador
F. Martínez 4'; Ju. Salas 11'; Rejala 21'	Report

Estadio Aldo Cantoni, San Juan
Referee: Gean Telles (Brazil), José Villar (Venezuela)

6 April 2017
15:00

Ecuador	1–9	Colombia
Meza 28'	Report	Abril 0'; Reyes 15'; Caro 17', 37'; K. Mejía 19'; Cuervo 19'; Gómez 33'; Gualdrón 34'; Echeverría 38'

Estadio Aldo Cantoni, San Juan
Referee: Darío Santamaría (Argentina), Marcelo Bais (Argentina)
6 April 2017
17:00

Peru	2–6	Paraguay
Aguilar 3'; Rivera 24'	Report	Rejala 14'; Ja. Salas 19'; Ju. Salas 23', 29'; F. Martínez 30', 39'

Estadio Aldo Cantoni, San Juan
Referee: Cristian Espíndola (Chile), Rodrigo Concha (Chile)

7 April 2017
15:00

Ecuador	4–3	Peru
Meza 15'; Quinde 32'; Salas 36'; Mercado 37'	Report	Rivera 14', 33'; Herrera 31' (pen.)

Estadio Aldo Cantoni, San Juan
Referee: José Villar (Venezuela), Henry Gutiérrez (Bolivia)
7 April 2017
17:00

Colombia	3–3	Uruguay
Cárdenas 10'; Diaz 23'; Caro 39'	Report	Salgués 29', 33'; Fedele 34'

Estadio Aldo Cantoni, San Juan
Referee: Gean Telles (Brazil), Christian Espíndola (Chile)

8 April 2017
16:00

Uruguay	3–3	Ecuador
De los Santos 1'; Palleiro 23'; Fedele 39'	Report	Meza 19', 24'; Portocarrero 37'

Estadio Aldo Cantoni, San Juan
Referee: Marcelo Bais (Argentina), Mario Espichán (Peru)
8 April 2017
18:00

Paraguay	5–5	Colombia
Ja. Salas 15' (pen.); F. Martínez 32'; Rejala 34', 39'; Neto 37'	Report	Caro 6' (pen.); Cuervo 12'; Abril 16'; Diaz 30'; Ortiz 31'

Estadio Aldo Cantoni, San Juan
Referee: Darío Santamaría (Argentina), Henry Gutiérrez (Bolivia)

9 April 2017
16:00

Colombia	3–6	Peru
Echeverría 5', 35'; Cuervo 17'	Report	Barrantes 4'; Tavera 10', 34'; Herrera 32'; Morei 39'; Canto 39'

Estadio Aldo Cantoni, San Juan
Referee: Henry Gutiérrez (Bolivia), Rodrigo Concha (Chile)
9 April 2017
18:00

Uruguay	6–4	Paraguay
Ataídes 1'; De los Santos 4', 36'; Palleiro 21'; Salgués 26'; Catardo 33'	Report	Neto 17', 22', 34'; Rejala 35'

Estadio Aldo Cantoni, San Juan
Referee: Christian Espíndola (Chile), Gean Telles (Brazil)

== Knockout stage ==
In the semi-finals and final, extra time and penalty shoot-out are used to decide the winner if necessary.

=== Bracket ===
Semi-finals
11 April
Argentina	3
Uruguay	1
11 April
Brazil	5
Paraguay	2

Final
12 April
Argentina	2
Brazil (a.e.t.)	4
Third place
12 April
Uruguay	3
Paraguay	4

Fifth place
11 April
Venezuela	4
Colombia	6

Seventh place
11 April
Bolivia	3
Ecuador	1

Ninth place
11 April
Chile	1
Peru	5

=== Ninth place play-off ===
11 April 2017
13:00

Chile	1–5	Peru
Araya 38'	Report	Tavera 3'; Ramírez 6'; Rivera 18'; Barrantes 29'; Canto 35'

Estadio Aldo Cantoni, San Juan
Referee: José Villar (Venezuela), Hugo Camargo (Colombia)

=== Seventh place play-off ===
11 April 2017
15:00

Bolivia	3–1	Ecuador
Rojas 6'; Saavedra 22'; Paz 33'	Report	Salas 24'

Estadio Aldo Cantoni, San Juan
Referee: Marcelo Bais (Argentina), Rodrigo Concha (Chile)

=== Fifth place play-off ===
11 April 2017
17:00

Venezuela	4–6	Colombia
Preciado 19', 39'; Froilán 29'; Polo 31'	Report	Giraldo 4', 30', 32'; Echeverría 18'; Reyes 21'; K. Mejía 38' (pen.)

Estadio Aldo Cantoni, San Juan
Referee: Gean Telles (Brazil), Andrés Martínez (Uruguay)

=== Semi-finals ===
11 April 2017
19:30

Argentina	3–1	Uruguay
Cuzzolino 2', 15' (pen.); Borruto 21'	Report	De los Santos 37'

Estadio Aldo Cantoni, San Juan
Referee: Yuri Garcia (Colombia), Henry Gutiérrez (Bolivia)
11 April 2017
21:30

Brazil	5–2	Paraguay
Deives 9', 10'; Rocha 15'; Neguinho 28'; Daniel 37'	Report	Ju. Salas 16' (pen.), 18' (pen.)

Estadio Aldo Cantoni, San Juan
Referee: Roly Rojas (Peru), Christian Espíndola (Chile)

=== Third place play-off ===
12 April 2017
20:00

Uruguay	3–4	Paraguay
Ataídes 18', 27'; Palleiro 26'	Report	Neto 12', 37'; F. Martínez 23'; Ja. Salas 36' (pen.)

Estadio Aldo Cantoni, San Juan
Referee: Gean Telles (Brazil), Darío Santamaría (Argentina)

=== Final ===
12 April 2017
22:00

Argentina	2–4 (a.e.t.)	Brazil
Rescia 2:04'; Borruto 32:42'	Report	Lino 32:57'; Felipe 38:35'; Marcel 43:50'; Arthur 44:15'

Estadio Aldo Cantoni, San Juan
Attendance: 8,500
Referee: Daniel Rodríguez (Uruguay), Yuri García (Colombia)

== Final ranking ==
Rank	Team
1st place, gold medalist(s)	Brazil
2nd place, silver medalist(s)	Argentina
3rd place, bronze medalist(s)	Paraguay
4	Uruguay
5	Colombia
6	Venezuela
7	Bolivia
8	Ecuador
9	Peru
10	Chile
