= Ecuador national futsal team =

Ecuador
- Shirt badge/Association crest
- Nickname(s): La Tri (Tricolor)
- Association: Ecuadorian Football Federation (Federación Ecuatoriana de Fútbol)
- Confederation: CONMEBOL (South America)
- FIFA code: ECU
- FIFA ranking: 103 ▲2 (8 May 2026)
| Principal colours | Alternate colours |

First international
- Paraguay 4–4 Ecuador (Brazil, 1 April 1992)

Biggest win
- Guatemala 2–7 Ecuador (Guayaquil, Ecuador, 12 October 2006); Chile 3–8 Ecuador (Mercedes, Uruguay, 25 June 2008); Chile 0–5 Ecuador (Bello, Antioquia, Colombia, 25 March 2010)

Biggest defeat
- Brazil 14–0 Ecuador (Asunción, Paraguay, 9 February 2016)

FIFA World Cup
- Appearances: 0

AMF World Cup
- Appearances: 3 (First in 2003)
- Best result: Quarterfinals (2007)

Copa América de Futsal
- Appearances: 9 (First in 1992)
- Best result: 4th place (1992)

Grand Prix de Futsal
- Appearances: 1 (First in 2009)
- Best result: 15th place (2009)

The Ecuador national futsal team is controlled by the Federación Ecuatoriana de Fútbol, the governing body for futsal in Ecuador and represents the country in international futsal competitions, such as the World Cup and the Copa América.

== Tournament records ==
=== FIFA Futsal World Cup ===
- 1989 - did not enter
- 1992 - did not qualify
- 1996 - did not enter
- 2000 - did not qualify
- 2004 - did not qualify
- 2008 - did not qualify
- 2012 - did not qualify
- 2016 - did not qualify
- 2021 - did not qualify
- 2024 - did not qualify

=== Copa América de Futsal ===
- 1992 – 4th place
- 1995 – did not enter
- 1996 – did not enter
- 1997 – did not enter
- 1998 – did not enter
- 1999 – did not enter
- 2000 – 1st round
- 2003 – 8th place
- 2008 – 6th place
- 2011 – did not enter
- 2015 – 9th place (host)
- 2017 – 8th place
- 2022 – 7th place
- 2024 – 10th place
- 2026 – 9th place

=== FIFA Futsal World Cup qualification (CONMEBOL)/CONMEBOL Preliminary Competition ===
- 2012 – 10th place
- 2016 – 8th place

=== FIFUSA/AMF Futsal World Cup ===
- 1982 - did not enter
- 1985 - did not enter
- 1988 - did not enter
- 1991 - did not enter
- 1994 - did not enter
- 1997 - did not enter
- 2000 - did not enter
- 2003 - 1st round
- 2007 - Quarterfinals
- 2011 - 1st round
- 2015 - did not enter
- 2019 - TBD

=== Grand Prix de Futsal ===
- 2005 – did not enter
- 2006 – did not enter
- 2007 – did not enter
- 2008 – did not enter
- 2009 – 15th place
- 2010 – did not enter
- 2011 – did not enter
- 2013 – did not enter
- 2014 – did not enter
- 2015 – did not enter
- 2017 – TBD

=== Futsal at the Pan American Games ===
- 2007 – 8th place
