= 2018 South American Under-20 Futsal Championship =

CONMEBOL Sudamericano Sub-20 de Futsal Peru 2018
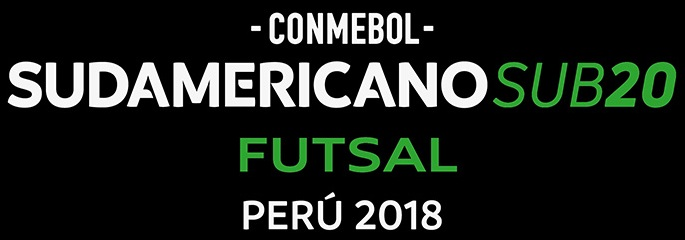
- 2018 South American Under-20 Futsal Championship logo

Tournament details
- Host country: Peru
- City: Lima
- Dates: 4–11 November 2018
- Teams: 10 (from 1 confederation)
- Venue: 1 (in 1 host city)

Final positions
- Champions: Brazil (7th title)
- Runners-up: Argentina
- Third place: Paraguay
- Fourth place: Venezuela

Tournament statistics
- Matches played: 27
- Goals scored: 177 (6.56 per match)
- Top scorer: (Brazil) Leonardo Caetano
- Best player: (Brazil) Evandro Borges
- Best goalkeeper: (Brazil) Kelvin Oliveira

The 2018 South American Under-20 Futsal Championship is the 8th edition of the South American Under-20 Futsal Championship (Spanish: CONMEBOL Sudamericano Sub-20 de Futsal), the biennial international youth futsal championship organised by the CONMEBOL for the men's under-20 national teams of South America. The tournament is held in Lima, Peru between 4–11 November 2018.

== Teams ==
All ten CONMEBOL member national teams entered the tournament.

- Argentina (title holders)
- Bolivia
- Brazil
- Chile
- Colombia
- Ecuador
- Paraguay
- Peru (hosts)
- Uruguay
- Venezuela

== Venues ==
All matches are played in one venue: Complejo Deportivo de la Federación Peruana de Fútbol in Lima.

== Draw ==
The draw of the tournament was held on 26 October 2018, 12:00 PET (UTC−5), at the headquarters of the Peruvian Football Federation. The ten teams were drawn into two groups of five teams. The defending champions Argentina and the hosts Peru were seeded into Groups A and B respectively, while the remaining teams were placed into four "pairing pots" according to their results in the 2016 South American Under-20 Futsal Championship: Brazil–Venezuela, Uruguay–Paraguay, Chile–Colombia, Bolivia–Ecuador.

== Group stage ==
All times are local, PET (UTC−5).

=== Group A ===
Pos	Team	Pld	W	D	L	GF	GA	GD	Pts	Qualification
1	Brazil	4	4	0	0	29	4	+25	12	Semi-finals
2	Argentina	4	3	0	1	14	9	+5	9	Semi-finals
3	Colombia	4	2	0	2	9	12	−3	6	Fifth place play-off
4	Uruguay	4	1	0	3	4	17	−13	3	Seventh place play-off
5	Ecuador	4	0	0	4	5	19	−14	0	Ninth place play-off

Source: CONMEBOL
4 November 2018
15:00

Brazil	8–0	Ecuador
	Report

Complejo Deportivo de la Federación Peruana de Fútbol, Lima
4 November 2018
17:00

Argentina	3–1	Colombia
	Report

Complejo Deportivo de la Federación Peruana de Fútbol, Lima

5 November 2018
15:00

Argentina	3–1	Uruguay
	Report

Complejo Deportivo de la Federación Peruana de Fútbol, Lima
5 November 2018
17:00

Colombia	3–2	Ecuador
	Report

Complejo Deportivo de la Federación Peruana de Fútbol, Lima

6 November 2018
15:00

Brazil	7–1	Colombia
	Report

Complejo Deportivo de la Federación Peruana de Fútbol, Lima
6 November 2018
17:00

Ecuador	1–2	Uruguay
	Report

Complejo Deportivo de la Federación Peruana de Fútbol, Lima

7 November 2018
15:00

Argentina	6–2	Ecuador
	Report

Complejo Deportivo de la Federación Peruana de Fútbol, Lima
7 November 2018
17:00

Brazil	9–1	Uruguay
	Report

Complejo Deportivo de la Federación Peruana de Fútbol, Lima

8 November 2018
15:00

Uruguay	0–4	Colombia
	Report

Complejo Deportivo de la Federación Peruana de Fútbol, Lima
8 November 2018
17:00

Argentina	2–5	Brazil
	Report

Complejo Deportivo de la Federación Peruana de Fútbol, Lima

=== Group B ===
Pos	Team	Pld	W	D	L	GF	GA	GD	Pts	Qualification
1	Venezuela	4	3	0	1	13	7	+6	9	Semi-finals
2	Paraguay	4	2	0	2	14	8	+6	6	Semi-finals
3	Peru (H)	4	2	0	2	14	11	+3	6	Fifth place play-off
4	Bolivia	4	2	0	2	11	14	−3	6	Seventh place play-off
5	Chile	4	1	0	3	8	20	−12	3	Ninth place play-off

Source: CONMEBOL
(H) Hosts
4 November 2018
19:00

Peru	7–2	Chile
	Report

Complejo Deportivo de la Federación Peruana de Fútbol, Lima
4 November 2018
21:00

Venezuela	3–2	Bolivia
	Report

Complejo Deportivo de la Federación Peruana de Fútbol, Lima

5 November 2018
19:00

Peru	0–5	Paraguay
	Report

Complejo Deportivo de la Federación Peruana de Fútbol, Lima
5 November 2018
21:00

Chile	1–3	Bolivia
	Report

Complejo Deportivo de la Federación Peruana de Fútbol, Lima

6 November 2018
19:00

Venezuela	4–5	Chile
	Report

Complejo Deportivo de la Federación Peruana de Fútbol, Lima
6 November 2018
21:00

Paraguay	3–5	Bolivia
	Report

Complejo Deportivo de la Federación Peruana de Fútbol, Lima

7 November 2018
19:00

Peru	7–1	Bolivia
	Report

Complejo Deportivo de la Federación Peruana de Fútbol, Lima
7 November 2018
21:00

Venezuela	3–0	Paraguay
	Report

Complejo Deportivo de la Federación Peruana de Fútbol, Lima

8 November 2018
19:00

Peru	0–3	Venezuela
	Report

Complejo Deportivo de la Federación Peruana de Fútbol, Lima
8 November 2018
21:00

Paraguay	6–0	Chile
	Report

Complejo Deportivo de la Federación Peruana de Fútbol, Lima

== Knockout stage ==
=== Bracket ===
Semi-finals
10 November
Venezuela	2
Argentina	5
10 November
Brazil	8
Paraguay	1

Final
11 November
Argentina	5 (0)
Brazil (p)	5 (2)
Third place
11 November
Venezuela	2
Paraguay	5

Fifth place
11 November
Colombia	3
Peru	1

Seventh place
11 November
Uruguay	4
Bolivia	3

Ninth place
10 November
Ecuador	11
Chile	1

=== Semi-finals ===
10 November 2018
19:00

Venezuela	2–5	Argentina

Complejo Deportivo de la Federación Peruana de Fútbol, Lima
10 November 2018
21:00

Brazil	8–1	Paraguay

Complejo Deportivo de la Federación Peruana de Fútbol, Lima

=== Ninth place play-off ===
10 November 2018
17:00

Ecuador	11–1	Chile

Complejo Deportivo de la Federación Peruana de Fútbol, Lima

=== Seventh place play-off ===
11 November 2018
14:00

Uruguay	4–3	Bolivia

Complejo Deportivo de la Federación Peruana de Fútbol, Lima

=== Fifth place play-off ===
11 November 2018
16:00

Colombia	3–1	Peru

Complejo Deportivo de la Federación Peruana de Fútbol, Lima

=== Third place play-off ===
11 November 2018
18:00

Venezuela	2–5	Paraguay

Complejo Deportivo de la Federación Peruana de Fútbol, Lima

=== Final ===
11 November 2018
20:00

Argentina	5–5 (a.e.t.)	Brazil
	Report
Penalties
	0–2

Complejo Deportivo de la Federación Peruana de Fútbol, Lima

== Final ranking ==
Rank	Team
1st place, gold medalist(s)	Brazil
2nd place, silver medalist(s)	Argentina
3rd place, bronze medalist(s)	Paraguay
4	Venezuela
5	Colombia
6	Peru
7	Uruguay
8	Bolivia
9	Ecuador
10	Chile
