= 2009 Grand Prix de Futsal =

Tournament details
- Host country: Brazil
- Dates: 28 June – 5 July
- Teams: 16 (from 5 confederations)
- Venue(s): 2 (in 2 host cities)

Final positions
- Champions: Brazil (5th title)
- Runners-up: Iran
- Third place: Romania
- Fourth place: Czech Republic

Tournament statistics
- Matches played: 48
- Goals scored: 349 (7.27 per match)

The 2009 Grand Prix de Futsal was the fifth edition of the international futsal competition of the same kind as the FIFA Futsal World Cup, but with invited nations and held annually in Brazil. It was first held in 2005.

== First round ==
=== Group A ===
Team	Pld	W	D	L	GF	GA	Diff	Pts
Brazil	3	3	0	0	29	3	26	9
Czech Republic	3	1	1	1	12	15	−3	4
Peru	3	1	0	2	7	20	−13	3
Mozambique	3	0	1	2	8	18	−10	1

=== Group B ===
Team	Pld	W	D	L	GF	GA	Diff	Pts
Iran	3	2	1	0	11	6	5	7
Romania	3	2	0	1	9	9	0	6
Costa Rica	3	1	1	1	6	7	−1	4
Uruguay	3	0	0	3	5	9	−4	0

=== Group C ===
Team	Pld	W	D	L	GF	GA	Diff	Pts
Paraguay	3	2	0	1	11	10	1	6
Guatemala	3	2	0	1	12	14	−2	6
Hungary	3	1	1	1	10	7	3	4
Angola	3	0	1	2	7	9	−2	1

=== Group D ===
Team	Pld	W	D	L	GF	GA	Diff	Pts
Argentina	3	3	0	0	11	5	6	9
Ukraine	3	1	1	1	7	5	2	4
Venezuela	3	0	1	2	8	11	−3	1
Ecuador	3	0	0	3	6	11	−5	0

=== Classification 9th–16th ===
Quarter finals
2 July
Peru	4
Angola	2
2 July
Venezuela	7
Uruguay	3
2 July
Costa Rica	4
Ecuador	3
2 July
Hungary	4
Mozambique	3

Semifinals (9th–12th)
3 July
Peru	3
Venezuela	4
3 July
Costa Rica	5
Hungary	2

Final
4 July
Venezuela	3
Costa Rica	2
11th place
4 July
Peru	3
Hungary	2

Semifinals (13th–16th)
3 July
Angola	3
Uruguay	5
3 July
Ecuador	2
Mozambique	4

13th place
4 July
Uruguay	6
Mozambique	3
15th place
4 July
Angola	2
Ecuador	3

=== Classification 1st–8th ===
Quarter finals
2 July
Brazil	8
Guatemala	2
2 July
Argentina	3 (2)
Romania	3 (4)
2 July
Iran	1 (5)
Ukraine	1 (3)
2 July
Paraguay	3 (2)
Czech Republic	3 (4)

Semifinals
3 July
Brazil	12
Romania	0
3 July
Iran	4 (4)
Czech Republic	4 (1)

Final
5 July
Brazil	7
Iran	1
3rd place
4 July
Romania	4
Czech Republic	2

Semifinals (5th–8th)
3 July
Guatemala	0
Argentina	3
3 July
Ukraine	4
Paraguay	2

5th place
4 July
Argentina	1 (4)
Ukraine	1 (3)
7th place
4 July
Guatemala	6
Paraguay	4

== Winner ==
Grand Prix de Futsal
2009 winners

Brazil
Fifth title
