= 2005 Grand Prix de Futsal =

Grand Prix das Américas 2005

Tournament details
- Host country: Brazil
- Dates: 20 September – 24 September
- Teams: 6 (from 1 confederation)
- Venue(s): 1 (in 1 host city)

Final positions
- Champions: Brazil (1st title)
- Runners-up: Colombia
- Third place: Argentina
- Fourth place: Uruguay

Tournament statistics
- Matches played: 17
- Goals scored: 95 (5.59 per match)

The 2005 Grand Prix de Futsal, also known as the Grand Prix das Américas 2005, was the inaugural edition of the international futsal competition of the same kind as the FIFA Futsal World Cup but with invited nations and held annually in Brazil.

== Venue ==
- Brusque/Santa Catarina (BRA)

== Teams ==
=== Group A ===
- Brazil
- Uruguay
- Venezuela

=== Group B ===
- Argentina
- Paraguay
- Colombia

== First round ==
=== Group A Standings ===
Team	Pld	W	D	L	GF	GA	Diff	Pts
Brazil	2	2	0	0	12	1	+11	6
Uruguay	2	0	1	1	1	5	−4	1
Venezuela	2	0	1	1	0	7	−7	1

20 September
18:30

Venezuela	0 – 0	Uruguay

Ginásio Arena Multiuso, Brusque/Santa Catarina
21 September
20:00

Brazil	5 – 1	Uruguay

Ginásio Arena Multiuso, Brusque/Santa Catarina
22 September
20:00

Brazil	7 – 0	Venezuela

Ginásio Arena Multiuso, Brusque/Santa Catarina

=== Group B Standings ===
Team	Pld	W	D	L	GF	GA	Diff	Pts
Colombia	2	2	0	0	4	0	+4	6
Argentina	2	1	0	1	4	4	0	3
Paraguay	2	0	0	2	3	7	−4	0

20 September
20:00

Paraguay	0 – 3	Colombia

Ginásio Arena Multiuso, Brusque/Santa Catarina
21 September
18:30

Argentina	0 – 1	Colombia

Ginásio Arena Multiuso, Brusque/Santa Catarina
22 September
18:30

Argentina	4 – 3	Paraguay

Ginásio Arena Multiuso, Brusque/Santa Catarina

== Final round ==
=== Classification 5th–6th ===
5th place
23 September
Paraguay	5
Venezuela	1

=== Classification 1st–4th ===
Semifinals
23 September
Colombia	3
Uruguay	0
23 September
Brazil	2
Argentina	0

Final
24 September
Brazil	7
Colombia	3
3rd place
24 September
Argentina	3
Uruguay	1

==== 5th/6th place match ====
23 September
17:00

Paraguay	5 – 1	Venezuela

Ginásio Arena Multiuso, Brusque/Santa Catarina

==== Semifinals ====
23 September
18:30

Colombia	3 – 0	Uruguay

Ginásio Arena Multiuso, Brusque/Santa Catarina
23 September
20:00

Brazil	2 – 0	Argentina

Ginásio Arena Multiuso, Brusque/Santa Catarina

==== 3rd/4th place match ====
24 September
08:00

Argentina	3 – 1	Uruguay

Ginásio Arena Multiuso, Brusque/Santa Catarina

==== Final ====
24 September
10:00

Brazil	7 – 3	Colombia

Ginásio Arena Multiuso, Brusque/Santa Catarina

Grand Prix das Américas
2005 winner

Brazil
First title
