= South American U-20 Futsal Championship =

CONMEBOL Sub 20 Futsal
- Organizer(s): CONMEBOL
- Founded: 2004; 22 years ago
- Region: South America
- Teams: 10
- Related competitions: CONMEBOL Sub 20 Futsal Femenina; CONMEBOL Sub 17 Futsal
- Current champion(s): Brazil (9th title)
- Most championships: Brazil (9 titles)
- Website: conmebol-sub-20-futsal
- 2024 CONMEBOL Sub 20 Futsal

The Sudamericano de Futsal Sub-20 (South American Under-20 Futsal Championship), branded as CONMEBOL Sub 20 Futsal, is an international futsal competition held every two years for South American under-20 men teams.

== Champions by year ==
Year	Host	Date	Gold	Silver	Bronze
2004	(Brazil) Fortaleza	Jun 14–20	Brazil	Venezuela	Uruguay
2006	(Venezuela) San Cristóbal	Oct 22–29	Brazil	Argentina	Venezuela
2008	(Colombia) Tunja	Dec 7–14	Brazil	Argentina	Venezuela
2010	(Colombia) Itagüí	Oct 30 – Nov 6	Brazil	Colombia	Argentina
2013	(Venezuela) Itagüí	Jun 15–22	Brazil	Colombia	Argentina
2014	(Brazil) Aracaju	Dec 15–21	Brazil	Colombia	Argentina
2016	(Uruguay) Montevideo	Dec 11–18	Argentina	Brazil	Venezuela
2018	(Peru) Lima	Nov 4–11	Brazil	Argentina	Paraguay
2020	Cancelled due to COVID-19 pandemic				
2022	(Venezuela) La Guaira	Sep 9–17 2023	Brazil	Argentina	Colombia
2024	(Peru) Villa El Salvador	Nov 16–24	Argentina	Colombia	Brazil
2026	(Venezuela) Barquisimeto	Sep 26 – Oct 4	Brazil	Venezuela	Colombia

== Medal count ==
Rank	Nation	Gold	Silver	Bronze	Total
1	Brazil	9	1	1	11
2	Argentina	2	4	3	9
3	Colombia	0	4	2	6
4	Venezuela	0	2	3	5
5	Paraguay	0	0	1	1
5	Uruguay	0	0	1	1
Totals (6 entries)		11	11	11	33
