= Jackson Samurai =

Brazilian futsal player

Personal information
- Full name: Jackson Van Riel Dalcanal
- Date of birth: 26 September 1989 (age 37)
- Place of birth: Não-Me-Toque, Brazil
- Height: 1.77 m (5 ft 10 in)
- Position: Winger

Team information
- Current team: Joinville
- Number: 2

Youth career
- 2002–2007: Joinville
- 2007–2009: Atlântico

Senior career*
Years	Team	Apps	(Gls)
2007	Joinville		
2007–2009	Atlântico		
2009–2012	Santos		
2013	Corinthians		
2013–2016	Intelli		
2017–	Joinville		

International career^{‡}
- Brazil
- * Club domestic league appearances and goals as of 00:00, 19 January 2019 (UTC) ‡ National team caps and goals as of 00:00, 19 January 2019 (UTC)

Jackson Van Riel Dalcanal (born 26 September 1989), commonly known as Jackson Samurai, is a Brazilian futsal player who plays as a winger for Joinville and the Brazilian national futsal team.
