= 2015 Copa América de Futsal =

Tournament details
- Host country: Ecuador
- City: Portoviejo
- Dates: 23–30 August
- Teams: 9 (from 1 confederation)
- Venue: 1 (in 1 host city)

Final positions
- Champions: Argentina (2nd title)
- Runners-up: Paraguay
- Third place: Brazil
- Fourth place: Colombia

Tournament statistics
- Matches played: 22
- Goals scored: 110 (5 per match)
- Top scorer(s): (Paraguay) Juan Salas (10 goals)

The 2015 Copa América de Futsal was the 11th edition of the Copa América de Futsal, the international futsal championship under FIFA rules organised by CONMEBOL for the men's national teams of South America. The tournament was held in Portoviejo, Ecuador between 23–30 August 2015.

== Teams ==
A total of nine CONMEBOL member national teams participated in the tournament. Bolivia did not participate due to financial problems.

Team	Previous best top-4 performance
Argentina	Champions (2003)
Brazil (holders)	Champions (1992, 1995, 1996, 1997, 1998, 1999, 2000, 2008, 2011)\
Chile	None
Colombia	Fourth place (2011)
Ecuador (hosts)	Fourth place (1992)
Paraguay	Runners-up (1998, 1999)
Peru	None
Uruguay	Runners-up (1996, 2008)
Venezuela	None

== Venues ==
All matches were played in one venue: Complejo Deportivo La California in Portoviejo.

== Referees ==
The official referees for the tournament were announced on 10 August 2015.

- (Argentina) Darío Santamarina
- (Argentina) Leonardo Lorenzo
- (Bolivia) Henry Gutiérrez
- (Brazil) Gean Telles
- (Chile) Cristian Espíndola
- (Colombia) Hugo Camargo
- (Colombia) Gury García
- (Ecuador) Jaime Játiva
- (Ecuador) José Hernández
- (Paraguay) Elvis Peña
- (Paraguay) Jorge Galeano
- (Peru) Mario Espichan
- (Peru) César Málaga
- (Uruguay) Daniel Rodríguez
- (Uruguay) Federico Cardozo
- (Venezuela) Félix Rumbos

== Group stage ==
The nine teams were drawn into one group of five teams and one group of four teams. The hosts Ecuador were placed in Group A, plus each group contained one team from each of the four "pairing pots": Argentina–Brazil, Colombia–Paraguay, Peru–Uruguay, Chile–Venezuela.

The top two teams of each group advance to the semi-finals, while the teams in third and fourth advance to the fifth place and seventh place play-offs respectively. The teams are ranked according to points (3 points for a win, 1 point for a draw, 0 points for a loss). If tied on points, tiebreakers are applied in the following order:

1. Goal difference in all games;
2. Goals scored in all games;
3. Head-to-head result in games between tied teams (two teams only);
4. Drawing of lots.

All times are local, ECT (UTC−5).

=== Group A ===
Pos	Team	Pld	W	D	L	GF	GA	GD	Pts	Qualification
1	Paraguay	4	3	1	0	20	7	+13	10	Knockout stage
2	Argentina	4	2	1	1	14	8	+6	7	Knockout stage
3	Chile	4	1	1	2	10	13	−3	4	Fifth place play-off
4	Peru	4	1	1	2	7	13	−6	4	Seventh place play-off
5	Ecuador (H)	4	0	2	2	5	15	−10	2	

Source: CONMEBOL
(H) Hosts
23 August 2015
18:00

Paraguay	5–1	Peru
Salas (??); Zaffe (??); H. Martínez (??); Rejala (??)	Report	Herrera (??)

Complejo Deportivo La California, Portoviejo
23 August 2015
20:00

Ecuador	2–2	Chile
Alcívar 11'; Espinales 15'	Report	Pávez 7'; Reyes 21'

Complejo Deportivo La California, Portoviejo

24 August 2015
17:00

Argentina	4–1	Chile
Bolo (??); Basile (??); Vaporaki (??)	Report	Carrasco (??)

Complejo Deportivo La California, Portoviejo
24 August 2015
21:00

Ecuador	1–1	Peru
Espinales 14'	Report	Aguilar 25'

Complejo Deportivo La California, Portoviejo

25 August 2015
15:00

Chile	5–2	Peru
Arriola (??); Concha (??); García (??); Fuentes (??); Araya (??)	Report	Ramírez (??); Yuptun (??)

Complejo Deportivo La California, Portoviejo
25 August 2015
19:00

Argentina	3–3	Paraguay
Kruger (??); Basile (??); Vaporaki (??)	Report	Alcaraz (??); Salas (??); Rejala (??)

Complejo Deportivo La California, Portoviejo

26 August 2015
18:00

Argentina	2–3	Peru
Vaporaki (??); Bolo (??)	Report	Falla (??); Tavera (??)

Complejo Deportivo La California, Portoviejo
26 August 2015
20:00

Ecuador	1–7	Paraguay
Alcívar (??)	Report	Salas (??); Villalba (??); Giménez (??); F. Martínez (??)

Complejo Deportivo La California, Portoviejo

27 August 2015
17:00

Paraguay	5–2	Chile
Salas (??); Zaffe (??); Pereira (??)	Report	Carrasco (??); Arriola (??)

Complejo Deportivo La California, Portoviejo
27 August 2015
21:00

Ecuador	1–5	Argentina
Meza (??)	Report	Kruger (??); González (??); Vaporaki (??); Abdala (??)

Complejo Deportivo La California, Portoviejo

=== Group B ===
Pos	Team	Pld	W	D	L	GF	GA	GD	Pts	Qualification
1	Brazil	3	3	0	0	11	2	+9	9	Knockout stage
2	Colombia	3	2	0	1	5	4	+1	6	Knockout stage
3	Uruguay	3	0	1	2	5	9	−4	1	Fifth place play-off
4	Venezuela	3	0	1	2	3	9	−6	1	Seventh place play-off

Source: CONMEBOL
24 August 2015
15:00

Colombia	2–0	Venezuela
Vivares (??); Caro (??)	Report

Complejo Deportivo La California, Portoviejo
Referee: César Malaga (Peru)
24 August 2015
19:00

Brazil	4–1	Uruguay
Dieguinho (??); Simi (??); Jackson (??)	Report	Otero (??)

Complejo Deportivo La California, Portoviejo

25 August 2015
17:00

Uruguay	2–2	Venezuela
Blankleider (??); Ordaqui (??)	Report	Figueroa (??); Quinteros (??)

Complejo Deportivo La California, Portoviejo
25 August 2015
21:00

Brazil	2–0	Colombia
Xuxa (??); Gadeia (??)	Report

Complejo Deportivo La California, Portoviejo

27 August 2015
15:00

Colombia	3–2	Uruguay
Caro 2', 39'; Díaz 38'	Report	Blankleider (??); Salgues (??)

Complejo Deportivo La California, Portoviejo
27 August 2015
19:00

Brazil	5–1	Venezuela
Thiaguinho (??); Pito (??); Rodrigo (??); Ciço (??)	Report	Falcón (??)

Complejo Deportivo La California, Portoviejo

== Knockout stage ==
In the knockout stage, extra time and penalty shoot-out are used to decide the winner if necessary.

=== Bracket ===
Semi-finals
29 August – Portoviejo
Paraguay	3
Colombia	1
29 August – Portoviejo
Brazil	2 (2)
Argentina	2 (3)

Final
30 August – Portoviejo
Paraguay	1
Argentina	4
Third place
30 August – Portoviejo
Colombia	1
Brazil	5

Fifth Place
29 August – Portoviejo
Uruguay	0
Chile	2
Seventh Place
29 August – Portoviejo
Peru	2
Venezuela	7

=== Seventh place play-off ===
29 August 2015
15:00

Peru	2–7	Venezuela
Herrera (??); Ramírez (??)		Manzanares (??); Polo (??); Sánchez (??); Rengifo (??); Rodríguez (??)

Complejo Deportivo La California, Portoviejo

=== Fifth place play-off ===
29 August 2015
17:00

Uruguay	0–2	Chile
		Carrasco (??); Pávez (??)

Complejo Deportivo La California, Portoviejo

=== Semi-finals ===
29 August 2015
19:00

Paraguay	3–1	Colombia
Villalba (??); Ayala (??)	Report	Reyes (??)

Complejo Deportivo La California, Portoviejo
29 August 2015
21:00

Brazil	2–2	Argentina
Simi (??); Gadeia (??)	Report	Basile (??); Kruger (??)
Penalties
Jackson (penalty scored); Rodrigo (penalty scored); Neto (penalty missed)	2–3	(penalty scored) Basile; (penalty scored) Abdala; (penalty scored) González

Complejo Deportivo La California, Portoviejo

=== Third place play-off ===
30 August 2015
15:00

Colombia	1–5	Brazil
Barreneche (??)	Report	Jackson (??); Rodrigo (??); Dieguinho (??); Arthur (??)

Complejo Deportivo La California, Portoviejo

=== Final ===
30 August 2015
17:30

Paraguay	1–4	Argentina
Zaffe (??)	Report	Stazzone (??); Abdala (??); Vaporaki (??); Bolo (??)

Complejo Deportivo La California, Portoviejo

== Final ranking ==
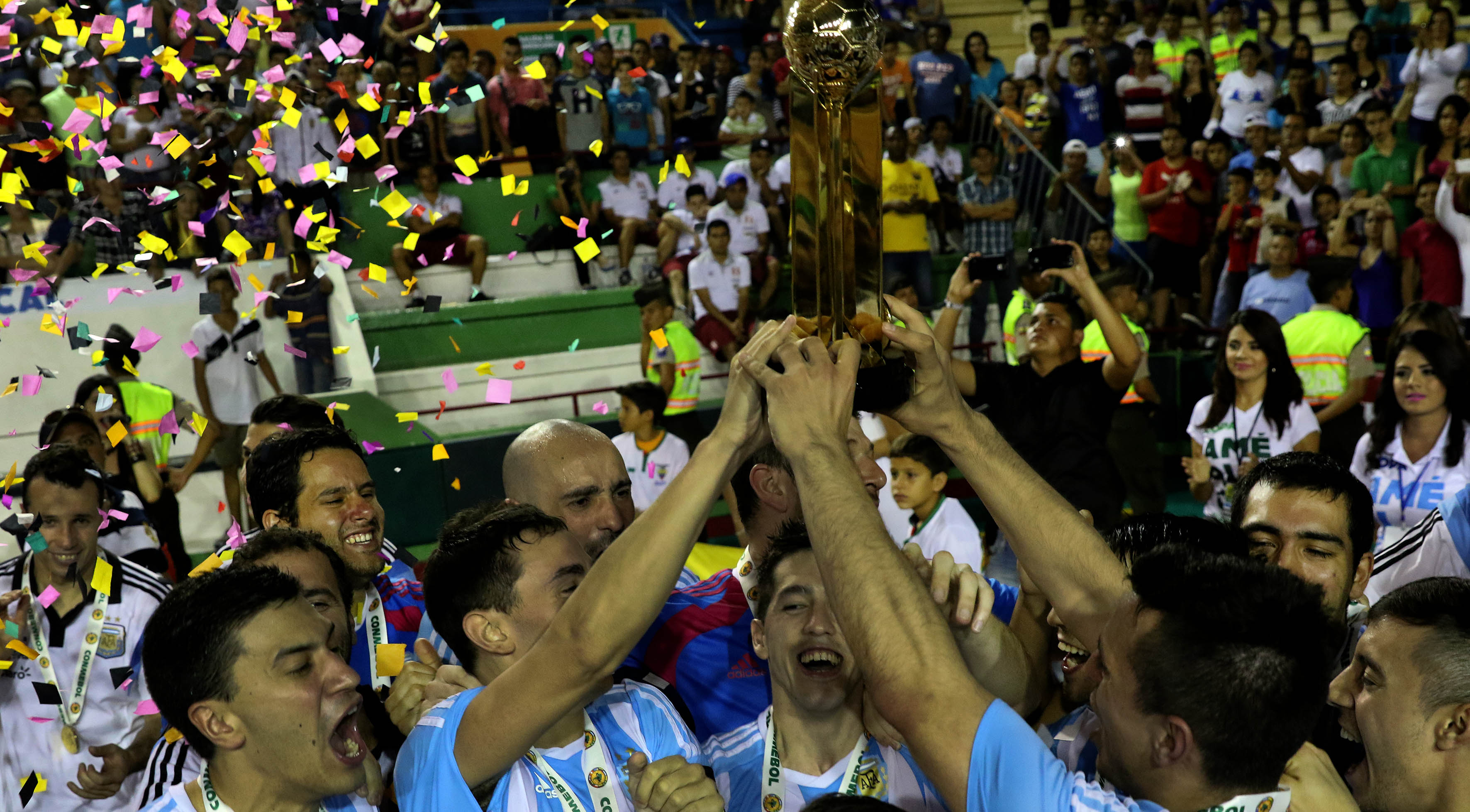
Argentina celebrating winning the trophy.

Per statistical convention in futsal, matches decided in extra time are counted as wins and losses, while matches decided by penalty shoot-out are counted as draws.

Pos	Team	Pld	W	D	L	GF	GA	GD	Pts
1st place, gold medalist(s)	Argentina	6	3	2	1	20	11	+9	11
2nd place, silver medalist(s)	Paraguay	6	4	1	1	24	12	+12	13
3rd place, bronze medalist(s)	Brazil	5	4	1	0	18	5	+13	13
4	Colombia	5	2	0	3	7	12	−5	6
5	Chile	5	2	1	2	12	13	−1	7
6	Uruguay	4	0	1	3	5	11	−6	1
7	Venezuela	4	1	1	2	10	11	−1	4
8	Peru	5	1	1	3	9	20	−11	4
9	Ecuador (H)	4	0	2	2	5	15	−10	2

Source: CONMEBOL
(H) Hosts

== Goalscorers ==
10 goals

- (Paraguay) Juan Salas

5 goals

- (Argentina) Alamiro Vaporaki

4 goals

- (Argentina) Santiago Basile
- (Argentina) Matías Kruger

3 goals

- (Argentina) Lucas Bolo
- (Brazil) Dieguinho
- (Brazil) Rodrigo
- (Colombia) Angellot Caro
- (Paraguay) René Villalba
- (Paraguay) Nicolás Zaffe

2 goals

- (Argentina) Gonzalo Abdala
- (Brazil) Gadeia
- (Brazil) Jackson
- (Brazil) Pito
- (Brazil) Simi
- (Chile) Carlos Arriola
- (Chile) Juan Antonio Carrasco
- (Chile) Milenko Pávez
- (Ecuador) Luis Alcívar
- (Ecuador) Jimmy Espinales
- (Paraguay) Richard Rejala
- (Peru) Martín Herrera
- (Peru) Renzo Ramírez
- (Peru) Xavier Tavera
- (Uruguay) Santiago Blankleider
- (Venezuela) Rosward Manzanares
- (Venezuela) Carlos Polo

1 goal

- (Argentina) Lucho González
- (Argentina) Damián Stazzone
- (Brazil) Arthur
- (Brazil) Ciço
- (Brazil) Thiaguinho
- (Brazil) Xuxa
- (Chile) Bernardo Araya
- (Chile) Frank Carrasco
- (Chile) Nilson Concha
- (Chile) Diego Fuentes
- (Chile) Yerko García
- (Chile) Christopher Reyes
- (Colombia) Luis Barreneche
- (Colombia) Yulián Díaz
- (Colombia) Andrés Camilo Reyes
- (Colombia) Johan Vivares
- (Ecuador) Darío Meza
- (Paraguay) Fabio Alcaraz
- (Paraguay) Emanuel Ayala
- (Paraguay) Gabriel Giménez
- (Paraguay) Francisco Martínez
- (Paraguay) Hugo Martínez
- (Paraguay) Magno Pereira
- (Peru) Jorge Aguilar
- (Peru) Vladimir Falla
- (Peru) Jorge Yuptun
- (Uruguay) Nicolás Ordaqui
- (Uruguay) Alexis Otero
- (Uruguay) Ignacio Salgues
- (Venezuela) José Falcón
- (Venezuela) Wilfredo Figueroa
- (Venezuela) Johan Quinteros
- (Venezuela) Kevin Rengifo
- (Venezuela) Edgar Rodríguez
- (Venezuela) Paolo Sánchez
