= 2014 Grand Prix de Futsal =

Tournament details
- Host country: Brazil
- Dates: 12 – 16 November
- Teams: 6 (from 3 confederations)
- Venue(s): 1 (in 1 host city)

Final positions
- Champions: Brazil (8th title)
- Runners-up: Colombia
- Third place: Iran
- Fourth place: Guatemala

Tournament statistics
- Matches played: 11
- Goals scored: 83 (7.55 per match)

The 2014 Grand Prix de Futsal was the ninth edition of the international futsal competition of the same kind as the FIFA Futsal World Cup but with invited nations and held annually in Brazil. It was first held in 2005.

== Participating ==
AFC (2)

- Iran
- Vietnam

CONCACAF (2)

- Costa Rica
- Guatemala

CONMEBOL (2)

- Brazil
- Colombia

== Group stage ==
=== Group A ===
Team	Pld	W	D	L	GF	GA	GD	Pts
Brazil	2	2	0	0	12	1	+11	6
Colombia	2	1	0	1	6	6	0	3
Vietnam	2	0	0	2	3	14	–11	0

12 November
18:45

Brazil	8 – 1	Vietnam

Ginásio Poliesportivo Adib Moysés Dib, São Bernardo do Campo
13 November
21:00

Brazil	4 – 0	Colombia

Ginásio Poliesportivo Adib Moysés Dib, São Bernardo do Campo
14 November
16:00

Colombia	6 – 2	Vietnam

Ginásio Poliesportivo Adib Moysés Dib, São Bernardo do Campo

=== Group B ===
Team	Pld	W	D	L	GF	GA	GD	Pts
Iran	2	2	0	0	12	3	+9	6
Guatemala	2	1	0	1	4	8	–4	3
Costa Rica	2	0	0	2	2	7	–5	0

12 November
16:00

Iran	7 – 2	Guatemala

Ginásio Poliesportivo Adib Moysés Dib, São Bernardo do Campo
13 November
16:15

Costa Rica	1 – 2	Guatemala

Ginásio Poliesportivo Adib Moysés Dib, São Bernardo do Campo
14 November
19:45

Iran	5 – 1	Costa Rica

Ginásio Poliesportivo Adib Moysés Dib, São Bernardo do Campo

== Final round ==
5th place
15 November
Vietnam	1
Costa Rica	3

Semifinals
15 November
Brazil	8
Guatemala	2
15 November
Iran	3
Colombia	4

Final
16 November
Brazil	7
Colombia	2
3rd place
16 November
Guatemala	4
Iran	10

=== Semi-finals ===
15 November
10:15

Brazil	8 – 2	Guatemala

Ginásio Poliesportivo Adib Moysés Dib, São Bernardo do Campo
15 November
12:00

Iran	3 – 4	Colombia

Ginásio Poliesportivo Adib Moysés Dib, São Bernardo do Campo

=== 5th place match ===
15 November
14:00

Vietnam	1 – 3	Costa Rica

Ginásio Poliesportivo Adib Moysés Dib, São Bernardo do Campo

=== 3rd place match ===
16 November
07:30

Guatemala	4 – 10	Iran

Ginásio Poliesportivo Adib Moysés Dib, São Bernardo do Campo

=== Final ===
16 November
10:30

Brazil	7 – 2	Colombia

Ginásio Poliesportivo Adib Moysés Dib, São Bernardo do Campo

== Final standing ==
Rank	Team
1st place, gold medalist(s)	Brazil
2nd place, silver medalist(s)	Colombia
3rd place, bronze medalist(s)	Iran
4	Guatemala
5	Costa Rica
6	Vietnam

2014 Grand Prix de Futsal winner

Brazil
