= Bolivia national futsal team =

Bolivia
- Nickname(s): La Verde (The Green one)
- Association: Federación Boliviana de Fútbol
- Confederation: CONMEBOL (South America)
- FIFA code: BOL
- FIFA ranking: 108 ▼2 (8 May 2026)
Home colours	Away colours

First international
- Brazil 6–2 Bolivia (Foz do Iguaçu, Brazil, 30 April 2000)

Biggest win
- Chile 4–12 Bolivia (Bello, Antioquia, Colombia, 24 March 2010)

Biggest defeat
- Brazil 15–1 Bolivia (Gramado, Brazil, 15 April 2012)

FIFA World Cup
- Appearances: 0

AMF World Cup
- Appearances: 6 (First in 1991)
- Best result: (silver) Runners-up (2000)

Copa América de Futsal
- Appearances: 8 (First in 2000)
- Best result: 4th place (2000)

The Bolivia national futsal team is controlled by the Federación Boliviana de Fútbol, the governing body for futsal in Bolivia and represents the country in international futsal competitions, such as the World Cup and the Copa América.

== Tournament records ==
=== FIFA Futsal World Cup ===
- 1989 - did not enter
- 1992 - did not enter
- 1996 - did not enter
- 2000 - did not qualify
- 2004 - did not qualify
- 2008 - did not qualify
- 2012 - did not qualify
- 2016 - did not qualify
- 2021 - did not qualify
- 2024 - did not qualify

=== Copa América ===
- 1992 – did not enter
- 1995 – did not enter
- 1996 – did not enter
- 1997 – did not enter
- 1998 – did not enter
- 1999 – did not enter
- 2000 – 4th place
- 2003 – 9th place
- 2008 – 8th place
- 2011 – 8th place
- 2015 – did not enter
- 2017 – 7th place
- 2022 – 8th place
- 2024 – 9th place
- 2026 – 10th place

=== FIFA Futsal World Cup qualification (CONMEBOL)/CONMEBOL Preliminary Competition ===
- 2012 – 9th place
- 2016 – 7th place

=== FIFUSA/AMF Futsal World Cup ===
- 1982 - did not enter
- 1985 - did not enter
- 1988 - did not enter
- 1991 - 4th place
- 1994 - Quarterfinals
- 1997 - 1st round
- 2000 - (silver) Runners-up (host)
- 2003 - (bronze) 3rd place
- 2007 - Quarterfinals
- 2011 - did not enter
- 2015 - did not enter
- 2019 - TBD
