= 2008 Copa América de Futsal =

Tournament details
- Host country: Uruguay
- Dates: 23–28 June
- Teams: 10 (from 1 confederation)
- Venue: 1 (in 1 host city)

Final positions
- Champions: Brazil (18th title)
- Runners-up: Uruguay
- Third place: Argentina
- Fourth place: Paraguay

Tournament statistics
- Matches played: 19
- Goals scored: 139 (7.32 per match)

The 2008 Copa América de Futsal was the 9th edition under FIFA rules, 20th edition of the main international futsal tournament of the South America region. It took place in Montevideo, Uruguay from 23 to 28 June 2008.

The tournament acted as a qualifying tournament for the 2008 FIFA Futsal World Cup in Brazil.

== Championship ==
The ten participating teams are divided into three groups of three in the first two groups and four teams in the last group, which will play each in a single round-robin format. The top team of each group advances to the semi-finals with the second placed team from Group C. The top three teams for the tournament will earn participation at the 2008 Futsal World Cup, if Brazil is one of the top 3, the third ticket to the World Cup will go to the fourth placed team in the championship.

=== Group A ===
| Team | Pld | W | D | L | GF | GA | GD | Pts |
|---|---|---|---|---|---|---|---|---|
| Argentina | 2 | 2 | 0 | 0 | 5 | 1 | +4 | 6 |
| Colombia | 2 | 1 | 0 | 1 | 6 | 6 | 0 | 3 |
| Venezuela | 2 | 0 | 0 | 2 | 4 | 8 | –4 | 0 |

2008-06-23
18:35

| Argentina | 2–1 | Colombia |

Mercedes

2008-06-24
18:00

| Colombia | 5–4 | Venezuela |

Mercedes

2008-06-25
18:35

| Argentina | 3–0 | Venezuela |

Mercedes

=== Group B ===
| Team | Pld | W | D | L | GF | GA | GD | Pts |
|---|---|---|---|---|---|---|---|---|
| Paraguay | 2 | 2 | 0 | 0 | 12 | 1 | +11 | 6 |
| Peru | 2 | 0 | 1 | 1 | 5 | 10 | –5 | 1 |
| Bolivia | 2 | 0 | 1 | 1 | 4 | 10 | –6 | 1 |

2008-06-23
16:45

| Paraguay | 6–0 | Bolivia |

Mercedes

2008-06-24
20:30

| Peru | 4–4 | Bolivia |

Canelones

2008-06-25
20:30

| Paraguay | 6–1 | Peru |

Canelones

=== Group C ===
| Team | Pld | W | D | L | GF | GA | GD | Pts |
|---|---|---|---|---|---|---|---|---|
| Brazil | 3 | 3 | 0 | 0 | 35 | 2 | +33 | 9 |
| Uruguay | 3 | 2 | 0 | 1 | 11 | 12 | –1 | 6 |
| Ecuador | 3 | 1 | 0 | 2 | 11 | 18 | –7 | 3 |
| Chile | 3 | 0 | 0 | 3 | 5 | 30 | –25 | 0 |

2008-06-23
20:10

| Uruguay | 6–2 | Chile |

Mercedes

21:50

| Brazil | 11–1 | Ecuador |

Mercedes

2008-06-24
20:10

| Uruguay | 4–2 | Ecuador |

Mercedes

22:00

| Brazil | 16–0 | Chile |

Mercedes

2008-06-25
20:10

| Uruguay | 1–8 | Brazil |

Mercedes

22:00

| Ecuador | 8–3 | Chile |

Mercedes

== Knockout stage ==
Semi-finals
27 June 2008 - Mercedes
Uruguay | 1 (3)
Paraguay | 1 (1)
27 June 2008 - Mercedes
Brazil | 5
Argentina | 2

Final
28 June 2008 - Mercedes
Uruguay | 2
Brazil | 6
Third place
28 June 2008 - Mercedes
Paraguay | 2
Argentina | 3

=== 9th place ===
2008-06-26
18:30

| Venezuela | 3–0 | Chile |

Canelones

=== 7th place ===
2008-06-26
22:00

| Peru | 5–2 | Bolivia |

Canelones

=== 5th place ===
2008-06-26
21:30

| Colombia | 6–1 | Ecuador |

Canelones

=== Semi-finals ===
2008-06-27
18:35

| Argentina | 2–5 | Brazil |

Mercedes
2008-06-27
20:10

| Uruguay | 1–1 (3–1 AET) | Paraguay |

Mercedes

=== 3rd Place ===
2008-06-28
17:00

| Argentina | 3–2 | Paraguay |

Mercedes

=== Final ===
2008-06-28
19:00

| Brazil | 6–2 | Uruguay |

Mercedes

2008 Copa America FIFA Futsal winners

Brazil
Eighteenth title

== Final classification ==
Team qualified for the 2008 FIFA Futsal World Cup as host
Team qualified for the 2008 FIFA Futsal World Cup

| Place | Team |
|---|---|
| 1 | Brazil |
| 2 | Uruguay |
| 3 | Argentina |
| 4 | Paraguay |
| 5 | Colombia |
| 6 | Ecuador |
| 7 | Peru |
| 8 | Bolivia |
| 9 | Venezuela |
| 10 | Chile |
