= 2003 Copa América de Futsal =

Tournament details
- Host country: Paraguay
- Dates: 26 August – 1 September
- Teams: 10 (from 1 confederation)
- Venue: 1 (in 1 host city)

Final positions
- Champions: Argentina (1st title)
- Runners-up: Brazil
- Third place: Paraguay
- Fourth place: Uruguay

Tournament statistics
- Matches played: 18
- Goals scored: 152 (8.44 per match)

The 2003 Copa América de Futsal was the 8th edition under FIFA rules, 19th edition of the main international futsal tournament of the South America region. It took place in Asunción, Paraguay from 26 August to 1 September 2003.

The tournament acted as a qualifying tournament for the 2004 FIFA Futsal World Championship in Taiwan.

== Championship ==
The ten participating teams are divided into three groups of three in the first two groups and four teams in the last group, which will play each in a single round-robin format. The top team of each group advances to the semi-finals with the second placed team from Group C. The top three teams for the tournament will earn participation at the 2004 Futsal World Championship.

=== Group A ===
Team	Pld	W	D	L	GF	GA	GD	Pts
Brazil	2	2	0	0	15	6	+9	6
Colombia	2	1	0	1	8	7	+1	3
Bolivia	2	0	0	2	5	15	–10	0

2003-08-26

Colombia	5–2	Bolivia

Estadio Sol de América, Asunción

2003-08-27

Brazil	10–3	Bolivia

Estadio Sol de América, Asunción

2003-08-28

Brazil	5–3	Colombia

Estadio Sol de América, Asunción

=== Group B ===
Team	Pld	W	D	L	GF	GA	GD	Pts
Argentina	2	2	0	0	11	3	+8	6
Venezuela	2	1	0	1	6	9	–3	1
Ecuador	2	0	0	2	6	11	–5	1

2003-08-26

Venezuela	5–4	Ecuador

Estadio Sol de América, Asunción

2003-08-27

Argentina	6–2	Ecuador

Estadio Sol de América, Asunción

2003-08-28

Argentina	5–1	Venezuela

Estadio Sol de América, Asunción

=== Group C ===
Team	Pld	W	D	L	GF	GA	GD	Pts
Paraguay	3	3	0	0	24	4	+20	9
Uruguay	3	2	0	1	12	6	+6	6
Peru	3	1	0	2	9	12	–3	3
Chile	3	0	0	3	6	30	–24	0

2003-08-26

Uruguay	4–1	Peru

Estadio Sol de América, Asunción

2003-08-26

Paraguay	16–2	Chile

Estadio Sol de América, Asunción

2003-08-27

Chile	3–6	Peru

Estadio Sol de América, Asunción

2003-08-27

Paraguay	4–0	Uruguay

Estadio Sol de América, Asunción

2003-08-28

Uruguay	8–1	Chile

Estadio Sol de América, Asunción

2003-08-28

Paraguay	5–2	Peru

Estadio Sol de América, Asunción

== Final round ==
Team	Pld	W	D	L	GF	GA	GD	Pts
Argentina	3	2	1	0	10	6	+4	7
Brazil	3	2	0	1	16	6	+10	6
Paraguay	3	1	1	1	15	14	+1	4
Uruguay	3	0	0	3	9	24	–15	0

2003-08-30

Brazil	8–1	Uruguay

Estadio Sol de América, Asunción

2003-08-30

Argentina	2–2	Paraguay

Estadio Sol de América, Asunción

2003-08-31

Brazil	0–1	Argentina

Estadio Sol de América, Asunción

2003-08-31

Paraguay	9–4	Uruguay

Estadio Sol de América, Asunción

2003-09-01

Argentina	7–4	Uruguay

Estadio Sol de América, Asunción

2003-09-01

Brazil	8–4	Paraguay

Estadio Sol de América, Asunción

2003 Copa America FIFA Futsal winners

Argentina
First title

== Final classification ==
Team qualified for the 2004 FIFA Futsal World Championship

Place	Team
1	Argentina
2	Brazil
3	Paraguay
4	Uruguay
5	Colombia
6	Peru
7	Venezuela
8	Ecuador
9	Bolivia
10	Chile
