= 2011 Copa América de Futsal =

Tournament details
- Host country: Argentina
- Dates: 11–17 September
- Teams: 9 (from 1 confederation)
- Venue: 1 (in 1 host city)

Final positions
- Champions: Brazil (19th title)
- Runners-up: Argentina
- Third place: Paraguay
- Fourth place: Colombia

Tournament statistics
- Matches played: 20
- Goals scored: 113 (5.65 per match)

The 2011 Copa América de Futsal was the 10th edition of the main international futsal tournament of the South America region under FIFA rules. It took place in Argentina from 11 to 17 September 2011.

Brazil won the competition.

== Venues ==
Venues Map

| Arena | Polideportivo de Almirante Brown |
|---|---|
| Picture | |
| City | Buenos Aires |
| Capacity | 5,000 |

== Referees ==
- (Argentina) Marcelo Bais
- (Argentina) Javier Santamaría
- (Brazil) Gean Telles
- (Chile) Ronald Silva
- (Colombia) Francisco Correa
- (Paraguay) Joel Ruíz
- (Paraguay) Óscar Ortiz
- (Peru) César Málaga
- (Uruguay) Ricardo Sosa
- (Venezuela) Manuel Benítez

== Group stage ==
=== Group A ===
| Team | Pts | Pld | W | D | L | GF | GA | GD |
|---|---|---|---|---|---|---|---|---|
| Brazil | 7 | 3 | 2 | 1 | 0 | 24 | 5 | 19 |
| Argentina | 7 | 3 | 2 | 1 | 0 | 14 | 6 | 8 |
| Peru | 3 | 3 | 1 | 0 | 2 | 6 | 16 | -10 |
| Chile | 0 | 3 | 0 | 0 | 3 | 5 | 22 | -17 |

12 September 2011
16:00

| Brazil | 14 – 2 | Chile |

Polideportivo Almirante Brown
Referee: Joel Ruiz (PAR) - Francisco Correa (COL)
12 September 2011
19:30

| Argentina | 7 – 2 | Peru |

Polideportivo Almirante Brown
Referee: Ricardo Sosa (URU) - Manuel Benitez (VEN)

13 September 2011
17:30

| Brazil | 8 – 1 | Peru |

Polideportivo Almirante Brown
Referee: Ricardo Sosa (URU) - Manuel Benitez (VEN)
13 September 2011
19:30

| Argentina | 5 – 2 | Chile |

Polideportivo Almirante Brown
Referee: Oscar Ortiz (PAR) - Manuel Benitez (VEN)

14 September 2011
18:00

| Chile | 1 – 3 | Peru |

Polideportivo Almirante Brown
Referee: Francisco Correa (COL) - Oscar Ortiz (PAR)
14 September 2011
20:00

| Argentina | 2 – 2 | Brazil |

Polideportivo Almirante Brown
Referee: Joel Ruiz (PAR) - Ricardo Sosa (URU)

=== Group B ===
| Team | Pts | Pld | W | D | L | GF | GA | GD |
|---|---|---|---|---|---|---|---|---|
| Colombia | 10 | 4 | 3 | 1 | 0 | 11 | 3 | 8 |
| Paraguay | 9 | 4 | 3 | 0 | 1 | 12 | 7 | 5 |
| Uruguay | 7 | 4 | 2 | 1 | 1 | 11 | 4 | 7 |
| Venezuela | 3 | 4 | 1 | 0 | 3 | 4 | 17 | -13 |
| Bolivia | 0 | 4 | 0 | 0 | 4 | 3 | 10 | -7 |

11 September 2011
17:00

| Bolivia | 0 – 2 | Colombia |

Polideportivo Almirante Brown
Referee: Marcelo Bais (ARG) - Dario Santamaria (ARG)
11 September 2011
19:00

| Uruguay | 0 – 1 | Paraguay |

Polideportivo Almirante Brown
Referee: Gean Telles (BRA) - Cesar Malaga (PER)

12 September 2011
12:00

| Venezuela | 0 – 3 | Colombia |

Polideportivo Almirante Brown
Referee: Cesar Malaga (PER) - Gean Telles (BRA)
12 September 2011
14:00

| Paraguay | 3 – 2 | Bolivia |

Polideportivo Almirante Brown
Referee: Dario Santamaria (ARG) - Ronald Silva (CHI)

13 September 2011
13:30

| Venezuela | 2 – 1 | Bolivia |

Polideportivo Almirante Brown
Referee: Gean Telles (BRA) - Ronald Silva (CHI)
13 September 2011
15:30

| Uruguay | 2 – 2 | Colombia |

Polideportivo Almirante Brown
Referee: Cesar Malaga (PER) - Marcelo Bais (ARG)

14 September 2011
14:00

| Paraguay | 7 – 1 | Venezuela |

Polideportivo Almirante Brown
Referee: Gean Telles (BRA) - Dario Santamaria (ARG)
14 September 2011
16:00

| Uruguay | 3 – 0 | Bolivia |

Polideportivo Almirante Brown
Referee: Marcelo Bais (ARG) - Cesar Malaga (PER)

15 September 2011
16:00

| Uruguay | 6 – 1 | Venezuela |

Polideportivo Almirante Brown
Referee: Gean Telles (BRA) - Dario Santamaria (ARG)
15 September 2011
18:00

| Paraguay | 1 – 4 | Colombia |

Polideportivo Almirante Brown
Referee: Marcelo Bais (ARG) - Manuel Benitez (VEN)

== Knockout stage ==
Semi-finals
16 September 2011 – B.A.
Argentina | 5
Colombia | 0
16 September 2011 – B.A.
Brazil | 6
Paraguay | 2

Final
17 September 2011 – B.A.
Argentina | 1
Brazil | 5
Third place
17 September 2011 – B.A.
Colombia | 1
Paraguay | 3

=== Semi-finals ===
16 September 2011
18:00

| Brazil | 6 – 2 | Paraguay |

Polideportivo Almirante Brown
Referee: Ricardo Sosa (URU) - Cesar Malaga (PER)
16 September 2011
20:00

| Argentina | 5 – 0 | Colombia |

Polideportivo Almirante Brown
Referee: Manuel Benitez (VEN) - Richard Silva (CHI)

=== Third Place ===
17 September 2011
14:00

| Colombia | 1 – 3 | Paraguay |

Polideportivo Almirante Brown

=== Final ===
17 September 2011
16:00

| Argentina | 1 – 5 | Brazil |

Polideportivo Almirante Brown
Referee: Joel Ruiz (PAR) - Marcelo Benitez (VEN)

2011 Copa America FIFA Futsal winners

Brazil
Nineteenth title

== Final ranking ==
| Gold medal | Brazil |
| Silver medal | Argentina |
| Bronze medal | Paraguay |
