= 2024 South American Under-20 Futsal Championship =

CONMEBOL Sub 20 Futsal Peru 2024

Tournament details
- Host country: Peru
- City: Villa El Salvador
- Dates: 16–24 November 2024
- Teams: 10 (from 1 confederation)
- Venue: 1 (in 1 host city)

Final positions
- Champions: Argentina (2nd title)
- Runners-up: Colombia
- Third place: Brazil
- Fourth place: Paraguay

Tournament statistics
- Matches played: 27
- Goals scored: 135 (5 per match)

The 2024 South American Under-20 Futsal Championship, stylized as CONMEBOL SUB20 Futsal 2022, was the 10th edition of the South American Under-20 Futsal Championship (Spanish: Campeonato Sudamericano Sub-20 de Futsal), the biennial international youth futsal championship organised by the CONMEBOL for the men's under-20 national teams of South America. The tournament was held in Villa El Salvador, Peru between 16–24 November 2024.

== Teams ==
All ten CONMEBOL member national teams entered the tournament.

- Argentina
- Bolivia
- Brazil (Title Holders)
- Chile
- Colombia
- Ecuador
- Paraguay
- Peru (Hosts)
- Uruguay
- Venezuela

== Venues ==
All matches were played in one venue: Legado Villa El Salvador.

== Group stage ==
All times are local, VET (UTC−4).

=== Group A ===
Pos	Team	Pld	W	D	L	GF	GA	GD	Pts	Qualification
1	Paraguay	4	3	1	0	10	5	+5	10	Semi-finals
2	Argentina	4	2	2	0	16	9	+7	8	Semi-finals
3	Peru	4	1	2	1	10	8	+2	5	Fifth place play-off
4	Ecuador	4	0	2	2	5	12	−7	2	Seventh place play-off
5	Chile	4	0	1	3	6	13	−7	1	Ninth place play-off

Source: futsalplanet.com

=== Group B ===
Pos	Team	Pld	W	D	L	GF	GA	GD	Pts	Qualification
1	Brazil	4	4	0	0	22	5	+17	12	Semi-finals
2	Colombia	4	2	0	2	12	6	+6	6	Semi-finals
3	Venezuela	4	2	0	2	11	6	+5	6	Fifth place play-off
4	Uruguay	4	2	0	2	8	9	−1	6	Seventh place play-off
5	Bolivia	4	0	0	4	2	29	−27	0	Ninth place play-off

Source: futsalplanet.com

== Knockout stage ==
=== Bracket ===
Semi-finals
23 November
Paraguay	0
Colombia	2
23 November
Brazil	0
Argentina	2

Final
24 November
Colombia	2
Argentina	4
Third place
24 November
Paraguay	0
Brazil	3

Fifth place
24 November
Peru	2
Venezuela	3

Seventh place
23 November
Ecuador	3
Uruguay	5

Ninth place
23 November
Chile	2
Bolivia	5

=== Semi-finals ===
23 November 2024
16:30

Paraguay	0–2	Colombia

legado Villa El Salvador, Villa El Salvador
23 November 2024
19:00

Brazil	0–2	Argentina

legado Villa El Salvador, Villa El Salvador

=== Ninth place play-off ===
23 November 2024
12:00

Chile	2–5	Bolivia

legado Villa El Salvador, Villa El Salvador

=== Seventh place play-off ===
23 November 2024
14:15

Ecuador	3–5	Uruguay

legado Villa El Salvador, Villa El Salvador

=== Fifth place play-off ===
24 November 2024
12:00

Peru	2-3	Venezuela

legado Villa El Salvador, Villa El Salvador

=== Third place play-off ===
24 November 2024
14:15

Paraguay	0-3	Brazil

legado Villa El Salvador, Villa El Salvador

=== Final ===
24 November 2024
17:00

Colombia	2-4	Argentina

legado Villa El Salvador, Villa El Salvador

CONMEBOL Under-20 Futsal 2024
champions

Argentina
2nd title

== Final standings ==
Rank	Team
1	Argentina
2	Colombia
3	Brazil
4	Paraguay
5	Peru
6	Venezuela
7	Ecuador
8	Uruguay
9	Bolivia
10	Chile
