= 2024 South American U-17 Futsal Championship =

2024 South American Under-17 Futsal Championship
CONMEBOL Sub 17 Futsal Paraguay 2024

Tournament details
- Host country: Paraguay
- City: Luque
- Dates: 17–25 August
- Teams: 10

Final positions
- Champions: Argentina
- Runners-up: Brazil
- Third place: Venezuela
- Fourth place: Bolivia

Tournament statistics
- Matches played: 27
- Goals scored: 158 (5.85 per match)

The 2024 South American Under-17 Futsal Championship was the 4th edition of the South American Under-17 Futsal Championship (Spanish: Campeonato Sudamericano de Futsal Sub-17), the biennial international youth futsal championship organised by the CONMEBOL for the men's under-17 national teams of South America. The tournament was held in Luque, Paraguay between 17 and 25 August 2024.

== Teams ==
All ten CONMEBOL member national teams entered the tournament.

- Argentina (title holders)
- Bolivia
- Brazil
- Chile
- Colombia
- Ecuador
- Paraguay (hosts)
- Peru
- Uruguay
- Venezuela

== Venues ==
All matches are played in one venue: at the Olympic Park's COP Arena in Luque, in the Greater Asunción area.

== Draw ==
The draw of the tournament was held on 27 May 2024 at the headquarters of the CONMEBOL in Luque. The ten teams were drawn into two groups of five teams. The hosts Paraguay and the defending champions Argentina were seeded into Groups A and B respectively, while the remaining teams were placed into four "pairing pots" according to their results in the 2022 South American Under-17 Futsal Championship: Brazil–Venezuela, Colombia–Peru, Chile–Ecuador and Bolivia–Uruguay.

== Group stage ==
The top two teams of each group advance to the semi-finals, while the teams in third, fourth and fifth advance to the fifth place, seventh place, and ninth place play-offs respectively. The teams are ranked according to points (3 points for a win, 1 point for a draw, 0 points for a loss). If tied on points, tiebreakers are applied in the following order (Regulations Article 6.2):

1. Results in head-to-head matches between tied teams (points, goal difference, goals scored);
2. Goal difference in all matches;
3. Goals scored in all matches;
4. Red cards in all matches;
5. Yellow cards in all matches
6. Drawing of lots.

All times are local, PYT (UTC−4).

=== Group A ===
Pos	Team	Pld	W	D	L	GF	GA	GD	Pts	Qualification
1	Brazil	4	4	0	0	18	3	+15	12	Knockout stage
2	Bolivia	4	2	0	2	17	19	−2	6 (Note: Head-to-head result: Bolivia 5–3 Paraguay.)	Knockout stage
3	Paraguay (H)	4	2	0	2	11	14	−3	6	Fifth place play-off
4	Ecuador	4	1	0	3	12	22	−10	3 (Note: Head-to-head result: Colombia 2–3 Ecuador.)	Seventh place play-off
5	Colombia	4	1	0	3	8	8	0	3	Ninth place play-off

Source: CONMEBOL
(H) Hosts
Notes:
17 August 2024

Bolivia	1–5	Colombia

COP Arena, Luque
17 August 2024

Paraguay	5–2	Ecuador

COP Arena, Luque

18 August 2024

Ecuador	1–6	Brazil

COP Arena, Luque
18 August 2024

Bolivia	5–3	Paraguay

COP Arena, Luque

19 August 2024

Ecuador	6–9	Bolivia

COP Arena, Luque
19 August 2024

Brazil	1–0	Colombia

COP Arena, Luque

21 August 2024

Brazil	5-2	Bolivia

COP Arena, Luque
21 August 2024

Colombia	1-3	Paraguay

COP Arena, Luque

22 August 2024

Colombia	2-3	Ecuador

COP Arena, Luque
22 August 2024

Paraguay	0-6	Brazil

COP Arena, Luque

=== Group B ===
Pos	Team	Pld	W	D	L	GF	GA	GD	Pts	Qualification
1	Argentina	4	4	0	0	14	2	+12	12	Knockout stage
2	Venezuela	4	3	0	1	11	4	+7	9	Knockout stage
3	Chile	4	2	0	2	11	10	+1	6	Fifth place play-off
4	Uruguay	4	0	1	3	7	16	−9	1	Seventh place play-off
5	Peru	4	0	1	3	6	17	−11	1	Ninth place play-off

Source: CONMEBOL
17 August 2024

Uruguay	4–4	Peru

COP Arena, Luque
17 August 2024

Argentina	4–2	Chile

COP Arena, Luque

18 August 2024

Chile	1–2	Venezuela

COP Arena, Luque
18 August 2024

Uruguay	0–5	Argentina

COP Arena, Luque

19 August 2024

Chile	5–3	Uruguay

COP Arena, Luque
19 August 2024

Venezuela	7–1	Peru

COP Arena, Luque

21 August 2024

Venezuela	2–0	Uruguay

COP Arena, Luque
21 August 2024

Peru	0–3	Argentina

COP Arena, Luque

22 August 2024

Peru	1-3	Chile

COP Arena, Luque
22 August 2024

Argentina	2-0	Venezuela

COP Arena, Luque

== Knockout stage ==
=== Bracket ===
Semi-finals
24 August
Brazil	3
Venezuela	0
24 August
Argentina	7
Bolivia	1

Final
25 August
Brazil	0
Argentina	2
Third place
25 August
Venezuela	2
Bolivia	0

Fifth place
25 August
Paraguay	5
Chile	4

Seventh place
23 August
Ecuador	8
Uruguay	7

Ninth place
24 August
Colombia	3
Peru	1

=== Ninth place play-off ===
24 August 2024

Colombia	3-1	Peru

COP Arena, Luque

=== Seventh place play-off ===
24 August 2024

Ecuador	8-7	Uruguay

COP Arena, Luque

=== Fifth place play-off ===
25 August 2024

Paraguay	5–4	Chile

COP Arena, Luque

=== Semi-finals ===
24 August 2024

Brazil	3–0	Venezuela

COP Arena, Luque
24 August 2024

Argentina	7–1	Bolivia

COP Arena, Luque

=== Third place play-off ===
25 August 2024

Venezuela	2–0	Bolivia

COP Arena, Luque

=== Final ===
25 August 2024

Brazil	0–2	Argentina

COP Arena, Luque

== Final ranking ==
Rank	Team
1st place, gold medalist(s)	Argentina
2nd place, silver medalist(s)	Brazil
3rd place, bronze medalist(s)	Venezuela
4	Bolivia
5	Paraguay
6	Chile
7	Ecuador
8	Uruguay
9	Colombia
10	Peru
