= 2020 FIFA Futsal World Cup qualification (CONMEBOL) =

Tournament details
- Host country: Brazil
- City: Carlos Barbosa
- Dates: 1–9 February 2020
- Teams: 10 (from 1 confederation)
- Venue: 1 (in 1 host city)

Final positions
- Champions: Argentina (2nd title)
- Runners-up: Brazil
- Third place: Paraguay
- Fourth place: Venezuela

Tournament statistics
- Matches played: 27
- Goals scored: 119 (4.41 per match)
- Top scorer: (Brazil) Gadeia (8 goals)
- Best goalkeeper: (Brazil) Guitta
- Fair play award: Argentina

The 2020 South American Futsal World Cup qualifiers was a men's futsal tournament that was used as the South American qualifying tournament to determine the four CONMEBOL teams playing in the 2021 FIFA Futsal World Cup (originally 2020 but postponed due to COVID-19 pandemic) in Lithuania. The tournament was held in Carlos Barbosa, Brazil between 1–9 February 2020.

Brazil were the defending champions.

Champions Argentina, runners-up Brazil, third-placed Paraguay and fourth-placed Venezuela qualified for the 2021 FIFA Futsal World Cup as the CONMEBOL representatives.

== Teams ==
All ten CONMEBOL member national teams entered the tournament.

Team	Previous best top-4 performance
Argentina	Champions (2012)
Bolivia	None
Brazil (holders and hosts)	Champions (2016)
Chile	None
Colombia	Fourth place (2012)
Ecuador	None
Paraguay	Runners-up (2012)
Peru	None
Uruguay	Fourth place (2016)
Venezuela	None

Note: Statistics start from 2012 when a separate qualifying tournament was held. Prior to 2012, the Copa América de Futsal was used as the CONMEBOL qualifying tournament for the FIFA Futsal World Cup.

== Venues ==
The matches were played at the Centro de Eventos Sérgio Luiz Guerra in Carlos Barbosa.

== Draw ==
The draw of the tournament was held on 15 January 2020, 12:30 PYST (UTC−3), at the CONMEBOL headquarters in Luque, Paraguay. The hosts and holders, Brazil, and the previous tournament's runners-up, Argentina, were seeded in Groups A and B respectively, while the other eight teams were divided into four pots based on their results in the 2016 qualifiers, and were drawn to the remaining group positions.

Seeded	Pot 1	Pot 2	Pot 3	Pot 4
Brazil (assigned to A1); Argentina (assigned to B1)	Paraguay; Uruguay	Venezuela; Colombia	Bolivia; Ecuador	Chile; Peru

== Group stage ==
The top two teams of each group advance to the knockout stage and qualify for the 2021 FIFA Futsal World Cup.

Tiebreakers

The ranking of teams in the first stage is determined as follows (Regulations Article 8):

1. Points obtained in all group matches (three points for a win, one for a draw, none for a defeat);
2. Goal difference in all group matches;
3. Number of goals scored in all group matches;
4. Points obtained in the matches played between the teams in question;
5. Goal difference in the matches played between the teams in question;
6. Number of goals scored in the matches played between the teams in question;
7. Fair play points in all group matches (only one deduction could be applied to a player in a single match):
  - Yellow card: −1 points;
  - Indirect red card (second yellow card): −3 points;
  - Direct red card: −4 points;
  - Yellow card and direct red card: −5 points;
8. Drawing of lots.

All times local, BRT (UTC−3).

=== Group A ===
Pos	Team	Pld	W	D	L	GF	GA	GD	Pts	Qualification
1	Brazil (H)	4	4	0	0	21	0	+21	12	Knockout stage and 2021 FIFA Futsal World Cup
2	Paraguay	4	3	0	1	11	5	+6	9	Knockout stage and 2021 FIFA Futsal World Cup
3	Colombia	4	2	0	2	9	9	0	6	Fifth place play-off
4	Peru	4	0	1	3	4	15	−11	1	Seventh place play-off
5	Ecuador	4	0	1	3	4	20	−16	1	Ninth place play-off

Source: CONMEBOL
Rules for classification: Group stage tiebreakers
(H) Hosts
1 February 2020
16:00

Brazil	3–0	Colombia
Gadeia x 2; Pito	Report

Centro de Eventos Sérgio Luiz Guerra, Carlos Barbosa
1 February 2020
20:00

Peru	2–2	Ecuador
Barrantes; Ramírez	Report	Quintilla; Izquierdo

Centro de Eventos Sérgio Luiz Guerra, Carlos Barbosa

2 February 2020
16:00

Brazil	2–0	Paraguay
Gadeia; Marlon Araújo	Report

Centro de Eventos Sérgio Luiz Guerra, Carlos Barbosa
2 February 2020
20:00

Colombia	5–1	Ecuador
Caro; Gómez; Díaz; Giraldo; Sánchez	Report	Caicedo

Centro de Eventos Sérgio Luiz Guerra, Carlos Barbosa

3 February 2020
18:00

Peru	1–3	Colombia
	Report

Centro de Eventos Sérgio Luiz Guerra, Carlos Barbosa
3 February 2020
20:00

Ecuador	1–2	Paraguay
	Report

Centro de Eventos Sérgio Luiz Guerra, Carlos Barbosa

5 February 2020
16:00

Brazil	11–0	Ecuador
	Report

Centro de Eventos Sérgio Luiz Guerra, Carlos Barbosa
5 February 2020
20:00

Peru	1–5	Paraguay
	Report

Centro de Eventos Sérgio Luiz Guerra, Carlos Barbosa

6 February 2020
18:00

Paraguay	4–1	Colombia
	Report

Centro de Eventos Sérgio Luiz Guerra, Carlos Barbosa
6 February 2020
20:00

Brazil	5–0	Peru
	Report

Centro de Eventos Sérgio Luiz Guerra, Carlos Barbosa

=== Group B ===
Pos	Team	Pld	W	D	L	GF	GA	GD	Pts	Qualification
1	Argentina	4	4	0	0	14	3	+11	12	Knockout stage and 2021 FIFA Futsal World Cup
2	Venezuela	4	3	0	1	12	5	+7	9	Knockout stage and 2021 FIFA Futsal World Cup
3	Uruguay	4	2	0	2	7	10	−3	6	Fifth place play-off
4	Chile	4	1	0	3	11	11	0	3	Seventh place play-off
5	Bolivia	4	0	0	4	1	16	−15	0	Ninth place play-off

Source: CONMEBOL
Rules for classification: Group stage tiebreakers
1 February 2020
14:00

Uruguay	2–0	Bolivia
Sosa; Navarro	Report

Centro de Eventos Sérgio Luiz Guerra, Carlos Barbosa
1 February 2020
18:00

Argentina	2–1	Venezuela
Vaporaki; Trípodi	Report	Viamonte

Centro de Eventos Sérgio Luiz Guerra, Carlos Barbosa

2 February 2020
14:00

Venezuela	3–0	Bolivia
Viamonte; Vidal; Fernández	Report

Centro de Eventos Sérgio Luiz Guerra, Carlos Barbosa
2 February 2020
18:00

Argentina	4–1	Chile
Taborda; Brandi; Tripodi; Basile	Report	Martínez

Centro de Eventos Sérgio Luiz Guerra, Carlos Barbosa

3 February 2020
14:00

Uruguay	1–5	Venezuela
	Report

Centro de Eventos Sérgio Luiz Guerra, Carlos Barbosa
3 February 2020
16:00

Chile	6–1	Bolivia
	Report

Centro de Eventos Sérgio Luiz Guerra, Carlos Barbosa

5 February 2020
14:00

Uruguay	3–2	Chile
	Report

Centro de Eventos Sérgio Luiz Guerra, Carlos Barbosa
5 February 2020
18:00

Argentina	5–0	Bolivia
	Report

Centro de Eventos Sérgio Luiz Guerra, Carlos Barbosa

6 February 2020
14:00

Chile	2–3	Venezuela
	Report

Centro de Eventos Sérgio Luiz Guerra, Carlos Barbosa
6 February 2020
16:00

Argentina	3–1	Uruguay
	Report

Centro de Eventos Sérgio Luiz Guerra, Carlos Barbosa

== Knockout stage ==
In the knockout stage, extra time and penalty shoot-out would be used to decide the winner if necessary (no extra time would be used in the play-offs for third to tenth place).

=== Bracket ===
Semi-finals
8 February
Brazil	3
Venezuela	0
8 February
Argentina	2
Paraguay	0

Final
9 February
Brazil	1
Argentina	3
Third place play-off
9 February
Venezuela	2
Paraguay	6

Ninth place play-off
8 February
Ecuador	2
Bolivia	0

Seventh place play-off
8 February
Peru	1 (4)
Chile (p)	1 (5)

Fifth place play-off
8 February
Colombia	4
Uruguay	0

=== Semi-finals ===
8 February 2020
11:00

Brazil	3–0	Venezuela
	Report

Centro de Eventos Sérgio Luiz Guerra, Carlos Barbosa

8 February 2020
13:00

Argentina	2–0	Paraguay
	Report

Centro de Eventos Sérgio Luiz Guerra, Carlos Barbosa

=== Ninth place play-off ===
8 February 2020
15:00

Ecuador	2–0	Bolivia
	Report

Centro de Eventos Sérgio Luiz Guerra, Carlos Barbosa

=== Seventh place play-off ===
8 February 2020
17:00

Peru	1–1	Chile
	Report
Penalties
	4–5

Centro de Eventos Sérgio Luiz Guerra, Carlos Barbosa

=== Fifth place play-off ===
8 February 2020
19:00

Colombia	4–0	Uruguay
	Report

Centro de Eventos Sérgio Luiz Guerra, Carlos Barbosa

=== Third place play-off ===
9 February 2020
11:00

Venezuela	2–6	Paraguay
	Report

Centro de Eventos Sérgio Luiz Guerra, Carlos Barbosa

=== Final ===
9 February 2020
13:00

Brazil	1–3	Argentina
Pito	Report	Cristian Borruto; Constantino Vaporaki; Pablo Taborda

Centro de Eventos Sérgio Luiz Guerra, Carlos Barbosa

== Final ranking ==
Teams qualified for the 2021 FIFA Futsal World Cup

Rank	Team
1st place, gold medalist(s)	Argentina
2nd place, silver medalist(s)	Brazil
3rd place, bronze medalist(s)	Paraguay
4	Venezuela
5	Colombia
6	Uruguay
7	Chile
8	Peru
9	Ecuador
10	Bolivia

== Qualified teams for FIFA Futsal World Cup ==
The following four teams from CONMEBOL qualified for the 2021 FIFA Futsal World Cup.

Team	Qualified on	Previous appearances in FIFA Futsal World Cup^{1}
Brazil	5 February 2020	8 (**1989**, **1992**, **1996**, 2000, 2004, **2008**, **2012**, 2016)
Venezuela	6 February 2020	0 (Debut)
Argentina	6 February 2020	8 (1989, 1992, 1996, 2000, 2004, 2008, 2012, **2016**)
Paraguay	6 February 2020	6 (1989, 1992, 2004, 2008, 2012, 2016)

^{1} Bold indicates champions for that year. Italic indicates hosts for that year.
