= FIFA Futsal World Cup qualification (CONMEBOL) =

- Organizing body: CONMEBOL
- Founded: 2012; 13 years ago
- Region: South America
- Number of teams: 10
- Current champion(s): Argentina (2nd title)
- Most successful team(s): Argentina (2 titles)
- Website: official
- 2020 qualifying tournament

The South American Futsal World Cup qualifiers (Spanish: Eliminatorias Sudamericanas de Futsal) is a futsal tournament organized by CONMEBOL to determine which South American teams qualified for the FIFA Futsal World Cup. The tournament has been organized every four years since 2012. Prior to it, the Copa América de Futsal was used as the South American qualifying tournament.

In general, the top four teams of the tournament qualify for the FIFA Futsal World Cup. However, if the World Cup hosts are from South America, only the top three teams plus the World Cup hosts qualify, such as in 2016 when Colombia were the World Cup hosts.

== Results ==
Ed.	Year	Host	Winner	Score	Runner-up	Third place	Score	Fourth place
1	2012	Brazil	Argentina	1–1 (a.e.t.) (7–6 p)	Paraguay	Brazil	5–1	Colombia
2	2016	Paraguay	Brazil	4–0	Argentina	Paraguay	7–2	Uruguay
3	2020	Brazil	Argentina	3–1	Brazil	Paraguay	6–2	Venezuela

== Medal summary ==
Rank	Nation	Gold	Silver	Bronze	Total
1	Argentina	2	1	0	3
2	Brazil	1	1	1	3
3	Paraguay	0	1	2	3
Totals (3 entries)		3	3	3	9

== See also ==
- Copa América de Futsal
