= 2016 FIFA Futsal World Cup qualification (CONMEBOL) =

Eliminatorias Sudamericanas de Futsal Paraguay 2016

Tournament details
- Host country: Paraguay
- City: Asunción
- Dates: 5–13 February 2016
- Teams: 10 (from 1 confederation)
- Venue: 1 (in 1 host city)

Final positions
- Champions: Brazil (1st title)
- Runners-up: Argentina
- Third place: Paraguay
- Fourth place: Uruguay

Tournament statistics
- Matches played: 27
- Goals scored: 154 (5.7 per match)
- Top scorer(s): (Brazil) Dione Veroneze (Colombia) Jonathan Giraldo (6 goals each)

The 2016 South American Futsal World Cup qualifiers was a men's futsal tournament that was used as the South American qualifying tournament to determine three of the four CONMEBOL teams in the 2016 FIFA Futsal World Cup final tournament in Colombia. The tournament was held in Asunción, Paraguay between 5–13 February 2016.

Champions Brazil, runners-up Argentina and third-placed Paraguay qualified for the 2016 FIFA Futsal World Cup as the CONMEBOL representatives, besides Colombia who qualified automatically as hosts.

== Teams ==
All ten CONMEBOL member national teams participated in the tournament.

Team	Previous best top-4 performance
Argentina (holders)	Champions (2012)
Bolivia	None
Brazil	Third place (2012)
Chile	None
Colombia	Fourth place (2012)
Ecuador	None
Paraguay (hosts)	Runners-up (2012)
Peru	None
Uruguay	None
Venezuela	None

Note: Statistics start from 2012 when a separate qualifying tournament was held. Prior to 2012, the Copa América de Futsal was used as the CONMEBOL qualifying tournament for the FIFA Futsal World Cup.

== Venues ==
The matches were played at the Polideportivo del Club Sol de América in Asunción.

== Group stage ==
The draw of the tournament was held on 23 October 2015 during the CONMEBOL Futsal Committee meeting at the CONMEBOL headquarters in Luque, Paraguay. The ten teams were drawn into two groups of five teams. Each group contained one team from each of the five "pairing pots": Argentina–Paraguay, Brazil–Colombia, Chile–Venezuela, Peru–Uruguay, Bolivia–Ecuador. The schedule of the tournament was announced on 8 January 2016.

The top two teams of each group advanced to the semi-finals, while the remaining teams proceeded to the classification play-offs for fifth to tenth place. The teams were ranked according to points (3 points for a win, 1 point for a draw, 0 points for a loss). If tied on points, tiebreakers were applied in the following order:

1. Head-to-head result in games between tied teams;
2. Goal difference in all games;
3. Goals scored in all games;
4. Drawing of lots.

All times local, PYST (UTC−3).

=== Group A ===
Pos	Team	Pld	W	D	L	GF	GA	GD	Pts	Qualification
1	Brazil	4	4	0	0	23	1	+22	12	Knockout stage
2	Paraguay (H)	4	2	1	1	11	6	+5	7	Knockout stage
3	Venezuela	4	2	0	2	11	13	−2	6	Fifth place play-off
4	Ecuador	4	1	0	3	7	22	−15	3	Seventh place play-off
5	Peru	4	0	1	3	5	15	−10	1	Ninth place play-off

Source: CONMEBOL
(H) Hosts
5 February 2016
21:00

Paraguay	2–2	Peru
Richard Rejala	Report	Martín Herrera; Milton Saldarriaga

Polideportivo del Club Sol de América, Asunción
Referee: Daniel Rodríguez, Federico Cardozo, Dario Santamaria
5 February 2016
22:30

Brazil	2–1	Venezuela
Jean Pierre Guisel (Pito); Diego Fonseca	Report	Rafael Morillo

Polideportivo del Club Sol de América, Asunción
Referee: Cristian Espindola, Herry Gutierrez, Yuri Garcia

6 February 2016
21:00

Venezuela	2–6	Paraguay
Wilfredo Figueroa; Teran Greydelvid	Report	Javier Salas; Richard Rejala; Francisco Martínez; Fabio Alcaraz; Rodrígo Ayala

Polideportivo del Club Sol de América, Asunción
Referee: Dario Santamaria, Marcelo Bais, Christian Espindola
6 February 2016
22:30

Peru	1–3	Ecuador
Martín Herrera	Report	Erick Miranda; Paul Santamaria; Jorge Portocarrero

Polideportivo del Club Sol de América, Asunción
Referee: Oswaldo Gómez, Yuri García, Federico Cardozo

8 February 2016
17:00

Ecuador	3–4	Venezuela
Jorge Portocarrero; Carlos Galarza	Report	Jorge Preciado; Carlos Méndez

Polideportivo del Club Sol de América, Asunción
Referee: Cristian Espíndola, Daniel Rodríguez, Henry Gutiérrez
8 February 2016
21:00

Paraguay	0–1	Brazil
	Report	Daniel Rollemberg

Polideportivo del Club Sol de América, Asunción
Referee: Yuri Garcia, Oswaldo Gomez, Marcelo Bais

9 February 2016
17:00

Brazil	14–0	Ecuador
Dione Veroneze; Luis Jeferson; Fernando Nascimiento; Jean Pierre Guisel (Pito); Rodrigo Hardy; Diego Fonseca; Ari Santos	Report

Polideportivo del Club Sol de América, Asunción
Referee: Federico Cardozo, Dario Santamaria, Daniel Rodríguez
9 February 2016
21:00

Venezuela	4–2	Peru
Alfredo Vidal; Carlos Méndez; Rafael Morillo; Wilfredo Figueroa	Report	Luis Ramos; Martín Herrera

Polideportivo del Club Sol de América, Asunción
Referee: Marcelo Bais, Henry Gutiérrez, Oswaldo Gómez

10 February 2016
19:00

Peru	0–6	Brazil
	Report	Ari Santos; Daniel Rollemberg; Diego Fonseca; Jean Pierre Guisel (Pito)

Polideportivo del Club Sol de América, Asunción
Referee: Oswaldo Gomez, Cristian Espinola, Federico Cardozo
10 February 2016
21:00

Ecuador	1–3	Paraguay
Carlos Galarza	Report	Juan Salas; Francisco Martínez; Fabio Alcaraz

Polideportivo del Club Sol de América, Asunción
Referee: Daniel Rodriguez, Yuri García, Dario Santamaria

=== Group B ===
Pos	Team	Pld	W	D	L	GF	GA	GD	Pts	Qualification
1	Argentina	4	4	0	0	20	2	+18	12	Knockout stage
2	Uruguay	4	2	1	1	13	6	+7	7	Knockout stage
3	Colombia	4	2	0	2	10	10	0	6	Fifth place play-off
4	Bolivia	4	0	2	2	6	20	−14	2	Seventh place play-off
5	Chile	4	0	1	3	6	17	−11	1	Ninth place play-off

Source: CONMEBOL
5 February 2016
17:00

Colombia	6–3	Chile
Wilmar Ramírez; Jonathan Giraldo; Yeison Fornera; Julián Díaz	Report	Juan Carrasco

Polideportivo del Club Sol de América, Asunción
Referee: Cesar Malga, Mario Espichan, José Hernández
5 February 2016
19:00

Argentina	4–2	Uruguay
Leandro Cuzzolino; Cristian Borruto; Maximiliano Rescia	Report	Nicolás Ordoqui

Polideportivo del Club Sol de América, Asunción
Referee: Gean Telles, Flavio Marques, Elvis Peña

6 February 2016
17:00

Uruguay	2–2	Bolivia
Federico Fedele; Nicolás Ordoqui	Report	Donald Montero; Iván Quisbert

Polideportivo del Club Sol de América, Asunción
Referee: Manuel Benítez, José Hernandez, Mario Espichan
6 February 2016
19:00

Chile	0–3	Argentina
	Report	Maximiliano Rescia; Cristian Borruto; Leandro Cuzzolino

Polideportivo del Club Sol de América, Asunción
Referee: Elvis Peña, Jorge Galeano, Flavio Marques

8 February 2016
19:00

Bolivia	3–3	Chile
Diego Montero; Ivan Quisbert; Carlos Fernández	Report	Bernardo Araya; Nilson Concha; Carlos Arriola

Polideportivo del Club Sol de América, Asunción
Referee: Mario Espichan, Gear Telles, Manuel Benítez
8 February 2016
22:30

Argentina	2–0	Colombia
Constantino Vaporaki; Taffarel Mauro	Report

Polideportivo del Club Sol de América, Asunción
Referee: Flavio Marques, Cesar Malaga, Jorge Galeano

9 February 2016
19:00

Colombia	4–1	Bolivia
Jonathan Giraldo; Luis Poveda; Angellot Caro	Report	Ivan Quisbert

Polideportivo del Club Sol de América, Asunción
Referee: José Hernández, Manuel Benítez, Cesar Malga
9 February 2016
22:30

Chile	0–5	Uruguay
	Report	Sebastián Castro; Leandro Ataides; Ignacio Buggiano; Gabriel Palleiro

Polideportivo del Club Sol de América, Asunción
Referee: Jorge Galeano, Elvis Peña, Gean Telles

10 February 2016
17:00

Bolivia	0–11	Argentina
	Report	Almiro Vaporaki; Lucas Volo; Leandro Cuzzolino; Pablo Taborda; Maximiliano Rescia; Santiago Basile; Alan Brandi

Polideportivo del Club Sol de América, Asunción
Referee: Elvis Peña, Flavio Marques, Jorge Galeano
10 February 2016
22:30

Uruguay	4–0	Colombia
Federico Fedele; Gabriel Palleiro; Ignacio Salgues	Report

Polideportivo del Club Sol de América, Asunción
Referee: Gean Telles, Mario Espichan, José Hernandez

== Knockout stage ==
In the knockout stage, extra time and penalty shoot-out were used to decide the winner if necessary (no extra time was used in the classification play-offs for fifth to tenth place).

=== Bracket ===
Semi-finals
Brazil	4
Uruguay	1
Argentina (p)	3 (3)
Paraguay	3 (2)

Final
Brazil	4
Argentina	0
Third place
Uruguay	2
Paraguay	7

Fifth Place
Venezuela	6
Colombia	4

Seventh Place
Ecuador	1
Bolivia	3

Ninth Place
Peru	2 (1)
Chile (p)	2 (2)

=== Ninth place play-off ===
12 February 2016
09:00

Peru	2–2	Chile
Martín Herrera; Milton Saldarriaga		Carlos Arriola; Yerko García
Penalties
Renzo Ramírez (penalty scored); Xavier Tavera (penalty missed); Luis Salerno (penalty missed)	1–2	(penalty scored) Juan Carrasco; (penalty scored) Gasaldy Pavez

Polideportivo del Club Sol de América, Asunción

=== Seventh place play-off ===
12 February 2016
10:30

Ecuador	1–3	Bolivia
Milton Nazate		Iber Paz; Mauricio Portocarrero; Robin Galvis

Polideportivo del Club Sol de América, Asunción

=== Fifth place play-off ===
12 February 2016
18:30

Venezuela	6–4	Colombia
Wilmer Cabarcas; Carlos Méndez; Lully Parada; Rafael Morillo; Greydelvid Terán; Johan Quintero		Richard Gutiérrez; James Castillo; Wilmar Ramírez; Jonathan Giraldo

Polideportivo del Club Sol de América, Asunción

=== Semi-finals ===
Winners qualified for 2016 FIFA Futsal World Cup.

12 February 2016
20:30

Brazil	4–1	Uruguay
Rafael Bezerra; Fernando Nascimiento; Dione Veroneze; Marcenio Ribeiro	Report	Nicolás Ordoqui

Polideportivo del Club Sol de América, Asunción
Referee: Cristian Espinola, Jose Hernández, Manuel Benítez

12 February 2016
22:30

Argentina	3–3 (a.e.t.)	Paraguay
Alamiro Vaporaki; Maximiliano Rescia; Cristian Borruto	Report	José Luis Santander; Richard Rejala; Rene Villalba
Penalties
Santiago Basile (penalty scored); Pablo Taborda (penalty missed); Leandro Cuzzolino (penalty scored); Maximiliano Rescia (penalty missed); Alan Brandi (penalty scored)	3–2	(penalty missed) René Villalba; (penalty scored) Javier Salas; (penalty scored) Juan Salas; (penalty missed) Francisco Martínez; (penalty missed) Richard Rejala

Polideportivo del Club Sol de América, Asunción
Referee: Yuri García, Cesar Malaga, Henry Gutiérrez

=== Third place play-off ===
Winner qualified for 2016 FIFA Futsal World Cup.

13 February 2016
20:30

Uruguay	2–7	Paraguay
Sebatián Castro	Report	Juan Salas; Richard Rejala; Francisco Martínez; René Villalba

Polideportivo del Club Sol de América, Asunción
Referee: Dario Santamaria, Gean Telles, Marcelos Bais

=== Final ===
13 February 2016
22:30

Brazil	4–0	Argentina
Luis Jeferson; Fernando Nascimiento; Rodrigo Hardy; Dione Veroneze	Report

Polideportivo del Club Sol de América, Asunción
Referee: Daniel Rodríguez, Elvis Peña, Mario Espichan

== Final ranking ==
Teams qualified for the 2016 FIFA Futsal World Cup

Rank	Team
1st place, gold medalist(s)	Brazil
2nd place, silver medalist(s)	Argentina
3rd place, bronze medalist(s)	Paraguay
4	Uruguay
5	Venezuela
6	Colombia
7	Bolivia
8	Ecuador
9	Chile
10	Peru

=== Qualified teams for FIFA Futsal World Cup ===
The following four teams from CONMEBOL qualified for the FIFA Futsal World Cup.

Team	Qualified on	Previous appearances in tournament^{1}
Colombia	28 May 2013	1 (2012)
Brazil	12 February 2016	7 (**1989**, **1992**, **1996**, 2000, 2004, **2008**, **2012**)
Argentina	12 February 2016	7 (1989, 1992, 1996, 2000, 2004, 2008, 2012)
Paraguay	14 February 2016	5 (1989, 1992, 2004, 2008, 2012)

^{1} Bold indicates champion for that year. Italic indicates host for that year.
