= José Botana Vázquez =

Venezuelan futsal player

Personal information
- Full name: Jose Manuel Botana Vazquez
- Date of birth: 24 January 1974 (age 52)
- Place of birth: Caracas, Venezuela
- Height: 1.78 m (5 ft 10 in)
- Position: Defender

Senior career*
Years	Team	Apps	(Gls)
1993 – 1996	Diablos de Miranda FSC		(57)
1996 – 1997	Saeta FSC		(8)
1997 – 1998	Bucaneros de Oriente FSC		(15)
1998 –	Huracanes de Apure FSC		(10)
2000 – 2001	A.S.D. Ariccia Colleferro		(9)
2001 – 2003	O Parrulo FS		(25)
2003 – 2004	Vefa Mera FS		(5)
Total		?	(129)

International career
1996 – 1998	Venezuela (futsal)	43	(25)
- * Club domestic league appearances and goals

Jose Manuel Botana Vazquez (born 24 January 1974), is a former Venezuelan futsal player of The Asociación Mundial de Futsal (AMF), is one of the members in the title of Venezuela national futsal team in AMF world cup 1997 celebrated in Guadalajara, Mexico.
