= Lucas Tripodi =

Argentine futsal player (born 1994)

Personal information
- Date of birth: 18 June 1994 (age 32)
- Place of birth: Buenos Aires, Argentina
- Position: Defender

Team information
- Current team: Ribera Navarra

Senior career*
Years	Team	Apps	(Gls)
2013	Pinocho		
2014	Villa La Ñata		
2015	Pinocho		
2015–2016	Palma		
2016–2018	Levante		
2018–2020	Ribera Navarra		
2020–2023	Inter		
2023–	Ribera Navarra		

International career
2014–	Argentina		
- * Club domestic league appearances and goals

Lucas Martín Tripodi (born 18 June 1994) is an Argentine futsal player who plays for Ribera Navarra and the Argentine national team.

== Club career ==
During his stint in Inter Movistar, Tripodi won the Supercopa de España, Copa de España and Copa del Rey in 2020–21 season.

== International career ==
Tripodi was Argentina's top scorer in the 2021 World Cup qualifiers, but was forced to miss the tournament due to a serious injury. In January 2024, he was included in the final list of players called up for the Copa América in which the Albiceleste were defeated in the final by Brazil 2–0.

== Honours ==
Inter

- Copa de España: 2020–21
- Copa del Rey: 2020–21
- Supercopa de España: 2020

Argentina

- Copa América runner-up: 2024
