= Chile national futsal team =

National sports team

Chile
- Shirt badge/Association crest
- Nickname(s): La Roja (The red one), El Equipo de Todos (Everybody's team)
- Association: Federación de Fútbol de Chile
- Confederation: CONMEBOL (South America)
- Head coach: (Argentina) Ignacio Cabral
- FIFA code: CHI
- FIFA ranking: 51 ▲1 (24 September 2026)
Home colours	Away colours

First international
- Brazil 4–2 Chile (Brasília, Brazil, 13 September 1987)

Biggest win
- Chile 7–0 Bolivia (Gramado, Brazil, 18 April 2012)

Biggest defeat
- Brazil 17–1 Chile (São Caetano do Sul, Brazil, 14 October 2006); Brazil 16–0 Chile (Mercedes, Uruguay, 24 June 2008)

FIFA World Cup
- Appearances: 0

AMF World Cup
- Appearances: 2 (First in 1994)
- Best result: 1st round (1994, 2003)

Copa América
- Appearances: 10 (First in 1986)
- Best result: 5th place (2015)

Confederations Cup
- Appearances: 1 (First in 2013)
- Best result: 3rd place (2013)

Grand Prix de Futsal
- Appearances: 3 (First in 2006)
- Best result: 6th place (2006)

The Chile national futsal team is controlled by the Federación de Fútbol de Chile, the governing body for futsal in Chile and represents the country in international futsal competitions, such as the World Cup and the Copa América de Futsal.

Chile has never achieved significant results at an international level, in the history of South American tournaments, it has never reached the top four places and therefore has never qualified for the World Cup, the first official victory in international competitions came in the 2000 Copa América in a 5-4 win over Ecuador.

The most significant results for the team to date came in the 2024 CONMEBOL Futsal Evolution League, where they finished first in the South zone in the senior category and were able to beat the South American powerhouses Paraguay and Argentina in official matches for the first time in history. Still, due to the results of the U-20 team, Chile finished second in the overall table and failed to qualify for the finals.

== Competitive record ==
=== FIFA Futsal World Cup ===
FIFA Futsal World Cup record										Qualification record						
Year	Round	Position	Pld	W	D	L	GF	GA	Squad	Outcome	Pld	W	D	L	GF	GA
(Netherlands) 1989	Did not enter									No qualification						
(Hong Kong) 1992	Did not enter									Qualification via Copa América de Futsal						
(Spain) 1996	Did not qualify									Qualification via Copa América de Futsal						
(Guatemala) 2000	Did not qualify									Qualification via Copa América de Futsal						
(Taiwan) 2004	Did not qualify									Qualification via Copa América de Futsal						
(Brazil) 2008	Did not qualify									Qualification via Copa América de Futsal						
(Thailand) 2012	Did not qualify									Group A 3rd place	5	1	1	3	12	23
(Colombia) 2016	Did not qualify									Group B 5th place	5	0	2	3	8	19
(Lithuania) 2021	Did not qualify									Group B 4th place	5	1	1	3	12	12
(Uzbekistan) 2024	Did not qualify									Qualification via Copa América de Futsal						
Total	—	0/10	0	0	0	0	0	0	—	3/3	15	2	4	9	32	54

=== Copa América de Futsal ===
Copa América de Futsal record
Year	Round	Position	Pld	W	D	L	GF	GA	Squad
(Brazil) 1992	Did not enter								
(Brazil) 1995	Did not enter								
(Brazil) 1996	Group stage	5th	2	0	1	1	3	4	—
(Brazil) 1997	Did not enter								
(Brazil) 1998	Did not enter								
(Brazil) 1999	Did not enter								
(Brazil) 2000	Group stage	6th	2	1	0	1	6	16	—
(Paraguay) 2003	Group stage	10th	3	0	0	3	6	30	—
(Uruguay) 2008	Group stage	10th	4	0	0	4	5	33	—
(Argentina) 2011	Group stage	9th	3	0	0	3	5	22	—
(Ecuador) 2015	Group stage	5th	5	2	1	2	12	13	—
(Argentina) 2017	Group stage	10th	5	0	0	5	4	24	—
(Paraguay) 2022	Group stage	10th	5	0	0	5	7	16	Squad
(Paraguay) 2024	Group stage	6th	5	2	1	2	10	11	Squad
(Paraguay) 2026	Group stage	7th	5	2	1	2	11	10	—
Total	5th place	10/15	39	7	4	28	69	179	—

=== FIFUSA/AMF Futsal World Cup ===
- 1982 – did not enter
- 1985 – did not enter
- 1988 – did not enter
- 1991 – did not enter
- 1994 – 1st round (forfeited)
- 1997 – did not enter
- 2000 – did not enter
- 2003 – 1st round
- 2007 – did not enter
- 2011 – did not enter
- 2015 – did not enter
- 2019 – TBD

=== Grand Prix de Futsal ===
- 2005 – did not enter
- 2006 – 6th place
- 2007 – 14th place
- 2008 – 14th place
- 2009 – did not enter
- 2010 – did not enter
- 2011 – did not enter
- 2013 – did not enter
- 2014 – did not enter
- 2015 – did not enter
- 2017 – TBD

=== Futsal Confederations Cup ===
- 2009 – did not enter
- 2013 – 3rd place
- 2014 – did not enter

== Players ==
=== Current squad ===
The following players were called up to the squad for the friendly matches against Russia on 23 and 24 September 2024.

No.	Pos.	Player	Date of birth (age)	Club
1	GK	Patricio Berríos	31 May 2004 (age 22)	(Argentine Football Association) Newell's Old Boys
12	GK	Bairont Morales	14 May 2006 (age 20)	(Football Federation of Chile) Magallanes
4	DF	Bernardo Araya (captain)	5 June 1993 (age 33)	(Royal Spanish Football Federation) Burela FS
5	DF	Iván Maldonado		(Argentine Football Association) Newell's Old Boys
14	DF	Bilan De La Paz	16 November 1995 (age 30)	(Argentine Football Association) Ferro Carril Oeste
2	MF	Francisco Soto	1 January 1997 (age 29)	(Italian Football Federation) ADJ Città di Anzio
3	MF	Alan Morán	3 September 2002 (age 24)	(Luxembourg Football Federation) Differdange 03
6	MF	Joshua Barrios	28 May 2000 (age 26)	(Brazilian Football Confederation) São Miguel Futsal
7	MF	Sebastián Figueroa	9 January 1995 (age 31)	(Football Federation of Belarus) Stalitsa Minsk
8	MF	Renato Martínez-Conde	27 December 1993 (age 32)	(Argentine Football Association) Ferro Carril Oeste
10	MF	Nicolás Lagos	7 December 1999 (age 26)	(Argentine Football Association) Ferro Carril Oeste
9	FW	Javier Fuentealba	9 November 2001 (age 24)	(Argentine Football Association) Barracas Central
11	FW	Cristian Arredondo	16 July 1990 (age 36)	(Luxembourg Football Federation) Differdange 03
13	FW	Sebastián Olave		(Argentine Football Association) Newell's Old Boys

=== Recent call-ups ===
The following players have also been called up to the squad within the last 12 months.

Pos.	Player	Date of birth (age)	Caps	Goals	Club	Latest call-up
^{COV} Player withdrew from the squad due to contracting COVID-19.^{INJ} Player withdrew from the squad due to an injury.^{PRE} Preliminary squad.^{RET} Retired from international futsal.
