= 2012 FIFA Futsal World Cup qualification (CONMEBOL) =

Tournament details
- Host country: Brazil
- City: Gramado
- Dates: 15–22 April 2012
- Teams: 10 (from 1 confederation)
- Venue(s): 1 (in 1 host city)

Final positions
- Champions: Argentina
- Runners-up: Paraguay
- Third place: Brazil
- Fourth place: Colombia

Tournament statistics
- Matches played: 27
- Goals scored: 185 (6.85 per match)

The tournament acted as the South American qualifying tournament for the 2012 FIFA Futsal World Cup in Thailand. It was held from 15 to 22 April 2012 in Gramado, Brazil. It was the first time a tournament different from Copa América qualified to the World Cup: the semi-finalists were qualified.

== Group stage ==
The draw was held on 3 March 2011. Ten teams were drawn into two groups. The top two finishers advanced to the semi-finals and qualified to the 2012 FIFA Futsal World Cup.

=== Group A ===
Team	Pld	W	D	L	GF	GA	GD	Pts
Brazil	4	4	0	0	37	1	+36	12
Argentina	4	3	0	1	16	5	+11	9
Chile	4	1	1	2	11	20	−9	4
Peru	4	1	1	2	9	20	−11	4
Bolivia	4	0	0	4	6	33	−27	0

15 April 2012
12:00

Brazil	15 – 1	Bolivia

15 April 2012
14:00

Argentina	6 – 0	Chile

16 April 2012
17:30

Argentina	6 – 2	Bolivia

16 April 2012
19:15

Brazil	9 – 0	Peru

17 April 2012
15:00

Chile	4 – 4	Peru

17 April 2012
21:00

Brazil	3 – 0	Argentina

18 April 2012
16:00

Argentina	4 – 0	Peru

18 April 2012
19:45

Chile	7 – 0	Bolivia

19 April 2012
15:00

Peru	5 – 3	Bolivia

19 April 2012
19:00

Brazil	10 – 0	Chile

=== Group B ===
Team	Pld	W	D	L	GF	GA	GD	Pts
Colombia	4	3	0	1	19	8	+11	9
Paraguay	4	3	0	1	15	9	+6	9
Uruguay	4	2	0	2	13	12	+1	6
Venezuela	4	2	0	2	12	17	−5	6
Ecuador	4	0	0	4	9	22	−13	0

15 April 2012
16:00

Uruguay	2 – 1	Venezuela

15 April 2012
18:00

Paraguay	3 – 0	Ecuador

16 April 2012
14:00

Paraguay	6 – 0	Venezuela

16 April 2012
16:00

Colombia	3 – 1	Uruguay

17 April 2012
17:00

Venezuela	5 – 4	Colombia

17 April 2012
19:00

Uruguay	8 – 4	Ecuador

18 April 2012
14:00

Venezuela	6 – 5	Ecuador

18 April 2012
17:45

Colombia	7 – 2	Paraguay

19 April 2012
17:00

Paraguay	4 – 2	Uruguay

19 April 2012
21:00

Ecuador	0 – 5	Colombia

== Knockout stage ==
Semi-finals
21 April 2012 – Gramado
Colombia	0
Argentina	1
21 April 2012 – Gramado
Brazil	3
Paraguay (a.e.t.)	5

Final
22 April 2012 – Gramado
Argentina (pen.)	1 (7)
Paraguay	1 (6)
Third place
22 April 2012 – Gramado
Colombia	1
Brazil	5

=== 9th place match ===
21 April 2012
09:00

Bolivia	5 – 4	Ecuador

=== 7th place match ===
21 April 2012
11:00

Peru	5 – 3	Venezuela

=== Semi-finals ===
21 April 2012
14:00

Colombia	0 – 1	Argentina

21 April 2012
16:00

Brazil	3 – 5 (a.e.t.)	Paraguay

=== 5th place match ===
22 April 2012
07:30

Chile	1 – 3	Uruguay

=== Third place play-off ===
22 April 2012
09:30

Colombia	1 – 5	Brazil

=== Final ===
22 April 2012
12:00

Argentina	1 – 1 (a.e.t.)	Paraguay
Penalties
	7 – 6

== Final classification ==
Team qualified for the 2012 FIFA Futsal World Cup

Place	Team
1	Argentina
2	Paraguay
3	Brazil
4	Colombia
5	Uruguay
6	Chile
7	Peru
8	Venezuela
9	Bolivia
10	Ecuador

== Awards ==
- Most Valuable Player
  - (Paraguay) Fabio Alcaraz
