= Paraguay national futsal team =

National futsal team of Paraguay

Paraguay
- Nickname(s): Guaraníes, La Albirroja (White and red)
- Association: Asociación Paraguaya de Fútbol (APF)
- Confederation: CONMEBOL (South America)
- FIFA code: PAR
- FIFA ranking: 18 (24 September 2026)
- Highest FIFA ranking: 12 (November 2024 – April 2025)
- Lowest FIFA ranking: 13 (May 2024)
Home colours	Away colours

First international
- United States 0–2 Paraguay (Brasília, Brazil; 15 September 1987)

Biggest win
- Paraguay 16–2 Chile (Asunción, Paraguay; 26 August 2003)

Biggest defeat
- Brazil 15–0 Paraguay (Umuarama, Brazil; 11 July 2005)

FIFA World Cup
- Appearances: 7 (First in 1989)
- Best result: Quarterfinals (2016, 2024)

AMF World Cup
- Appearances: 10 (First in 1982)
- Best result: (gold) Champions (1988, 2003, 2007, 2023)

Copa América de Futsal
- Appearances: 17 (First in 1965)
- Best result: (gold) Champions (1965)

Grand Prix de Futsal
- Appearances: 8 (First in 2005)
- Best result: (bronze) 3rd place (2010)

The Paraguay national futsal team represents Paraguay during international futsal competitions and is controlled by a branch of the Paraguayan Football Association (Spanish: Asociación Paraguaya de Fútbol). Its biggest accomplishment is becoming champions of the AMF Futsal World Cup on four occasions (1988, 2003, 2007, 2023).

== Competitive record ==
=== FIFA Futsal World Cup ===
FIFA Futsal World Cup record
Year	Round	GP	W	D	L	GS	GA
Netherlands 1989	Second round	6	2	2	2	14	14
Hong Kong 1992	First round	3	1	0	2	14	18
Spain 1996	did not qualify						
Guatemala 2000	did not qualify						
Taiwan 2004	First round	3	1	0	2	8	11
Brazil 2008	Second round	7	3	1	3	27	17
Thailand 2012	Round of 16	4	1	1	2	10	15
Colombia 2016	Quarterfinals	5	2	1	2	20	13
Lithuania 2021	Round of 16	4	2	0	2	7	12
Uzbekistan 2024	Quarterfinals	5	3	0	2	15	11
Total	8/10	37	15	5	17	115	111

=== FIFUSA/AMF Futsal World Cup ===
- 1982 — (silver) Second place
- 1985 — (bronze) Third place
- 1988 — (gold) Champions
- 1991 — (silver) Second place
- 1994 — Quarterfinals
- 1997 — did not play
- 2000 — Second round
- 2003 — (gold) Champions (host)
- 2007 — (gold) Champions
- 2011 — (silver) Second place
- 2015 — (silver) Second place
- 2019 — (bronze) Third place
- 2023 — (gold) Champions

=== South American Futsal Championship ===
- 1965 — (gold) Champions (host)
- 1969 — (silver) Second place (host)
- 1971 — (bronze) Third place
- 1973 — (bronze) Third place
- 1975 — (bronze) Third place
- 1976 — (silver) Second place
- 1977 — (silver) Second place
- 1979 — did not play
- 1983 — (silver) Second place
- 1986 — (silver) Second place
- 1989 — (silver) Second place
- 1992 — (bronze) Third place
- 1995 — Fourth place
- 1996 — Fourth place
- 1997 — (bronze) Third place
- 1998 — (silver) Second place
- 1999 — (silver) Second place
- 2000 — First round
- 2003 — (bronze) Third place (host)
- 2008 — Fourth place
- 2011 — (bronze) Third place
- 2015 — (silver) Second place
- 2017 — (bronze) Third place
- 2022 — (silver) Second place (host)
- 2024 — Fourth place (host)
- 2026 — Eighth place (host)

=== FIFA Futsal World Cup qualification (CONMEBOL) ===
- 2012 — (silver) Second place
- 2016 — (bronze) Third place (host)
- 2020 — (bronze) Third place

=== Grand Prix de Futsal ===
- 2005 — Fifth place
- 2006 — did not play
- 2007 — Twelfth place
- 2008 — Fourth place
- 2009 — Eighth place
- 2010 — (bronze) Bronze medal
- 2011 — Sixth place
- 2013 — Fourth place
- 2014 — did not play
- 2015 — Fourth place

=== Futsal Mundialito ===
- 1994 — did not play
- 1995 — did not play
- 1996 — (silver) Second place
- 1998 — did not play
- 2001 — did not play
- 2002 — did not play
- 2006 — did not play
- 2007 — did not play
- 2008 — did not play

=== Futsal Finalissima ===
- 2022 — (bronze) Third place

== Honours ==
- AMF Futsal World Cup
  - Winners (4): 1988, 2003, 2007, 2023
- Copa América de Futsal
  - Winners (1): 1965
- Futsal Mundialito
  - Silver Medal (1): 1996
- Futsal Finalissima
  - Bronze Medal (1): 2022
- Pan American Games
  - Bronze Medal (1): 2007
- Grand Prix de Futsal
  - Bronze Medal (1): 2010
- Bolivarian Games
  - Winners (1): 2013
  - Silver Medal (1): 2022

== Results and fixtures ==
The following is a list of match results in the last 12 months, as well as any future matches that have been scheduled.

Legend

Win Draw Lose Fixture

== Players ==
=== Current squad ===
The following players were called up to the Paraguay squad for the 2024 FIFA Futsal World Cup. Paraguay announced their 14-man squad on 30 August 2024.

Head coach: Carlos Chilavert

No.	Pos.	Player	Date of birth (age)	Club
1	GK	Igor Insfrán	29 August 2002 (aged 22)	(Paraguayan Football Association) Club Olimpia
2	DF	Alan Rojas	20 October 1998 (aged 25)	(French Football Federation) Sporting Paris
3	DF	Damián Mareco (captain)	4 September 1994 (aged 30)	(Royal Spanish Football Federation) Córdoba Futsal
4	MF	Emerson Méndez	18 November 2001 (aged 22)	(Paraguayan Football Association) Cerro Porteño
5	GK	Marcio Ramírez	10 June 2004 (aged 20)	(Paraguayan Football Association) Club Olimpia
6	MF	Lucas Suárez	7 February 1993 (aged 31)	(Argentine Football Association) 17 de Agosto
7	FW	Javier Salas	22 September 1993 (aged 30)	(Italian Football Federation) Napoli C5
8	MF	Pedro Pascottini	30 November 1998 (aged 25)	(Paraguayan Football Association) Cerro Porteño
9	MF	Hugo Martínez	12 January 1993 (aged 31)	(French Football Federation) Béthune Essars Futsal
10	FW	Arnaldo Báez	30 March 1996 (aged 28)	(Royal Spanish Football Federation) Córdoba Futsal
11	FW	Francisco Martínez	12 January 1993 (aged 31)	(French Football Federation) Béthune Essars Futsal
12	GK	Giovanni González	5 May 1995 (aged 29)	(Royal Spanish Football Federation) Servigroup Peñíscola
13	FW	Aldo Amarilla	31 December 1994 (aged 29)	(French Football Federation) Sporting Paris
14	MF	Jorge Espinoza	22 November 1993 (aged 30)	(Paraguayan Football Association) Cerro Porteño

=== Recent call-ups ===
The following players have also been called up to the squad within the last 12 months.

Pos.	Player	Date of birth (age)	Caps	Goals	Club	Latest call-up
FW	Vander Méndez Salas	3 October 1997 (age 29)			(Italy) Saviatesta Mantova	2022 Copa América de Futsal
DF	Neto Veiga	3 October 1998 (age 28)			(Thailand) Hongyen Thakam	2022 Copa América de Futsal
MF	Pedro Garay	23 March 1989 (age 37)			(Paraguay) Club Olimpia	2022 Copa América de Futsal
MF	Juan Manuel Benítez	1 January 1998 (age 28)			(Paraguay) Club Olimpia	2022 Copa América de Futsal
^{COV} Player withdrew from the squad due to contracting COVID-19.^{INJ} Player withdrew from the squad due to an injury.^{PRE} Preliminary squad.^{RET} Retired from international futsal.

== See also ==
- Paraguay national football team
