= Venezuela national futsal team =

Venezuela
- Nickname(s): La Vinotinto (The Burgundy); Los Llaneros (The Plainsmen)
- Association: Federación Venezolana de Fútbol
- Confederation: CONMEBOL (South America)
- Head coach: Robinson Romero
- FIFA code: VEN
- FIFA ranking: 15 ▲1 (24 September 2026)
Home colours	Away colours

First international
- Brazil 13–1 Venezuela (Niterói, Brazil, 16 April 1996)

Biggest win
- Peru 2–7 Venezuela (Portoviejo, Ecuador, 29 August 2015)

Biggest defeat
- Brazil 13–1 Venezuela (Niterói, Brazil, 16 April 1996)

FIFA World Cup
- Appearances: 2 (First in 2021)
- Best result: Quarterfinal (2024)

AMF World Cup
- Appearances: 6 (First in 1991)
- Best result: (gold) Champions (1997)

Copa América
- Appearances: 10 (First in 1996)
- Best result: 3rd place (2024)

Grand Prix de Futsal
- Appearances: 3 (First in 2005)
- Best result: 6th place (2005)

The Venezuela national futsal team represents Venezuela in international futsal competitions, such as the World Cup and the Copa América. It is controlled by the Federación Venezolana de Fútbol.

== Results and fixtures ==
The following is a list of match results in the last 12 months, as well as any future matches that have been scheduled.

Legend

Win Draw Lose Fixture

== Players ==
=== Current squad ===
The following 16 players were called up for 2021 FIFA Futsal World Cup

No.	Pos.	Player	Date of birth (age)	Caps	Club
1	GK	Jhonny Rueda	10 December 1988 (age 37)	71	(Spain) CSF Montsan
2	DF	Carlos Sanz	7 July 1980 (age 46)	32	(Croatia) Novo Vrijeme Makarska
3	FW	Wilmer Cabarcas	15 September 1994 (age 32)	10	(Italy) Modena Cavezzo
4	DF	Greydelvid Terán	24 November 1991 (age 34)	34	(Venezuela) La Fría del Sur
5	DF	Henry Gutiérrez	10 May 1997 (age 29)	22	(Finland) FC Kemi
6	DF	Carlos Polo	26 March 1992 (age 34)	12	(Venezuela) Delta Te Quiero
7	MF	Jesús Viamonte	9 April 1997 (age 29)	32	(Spain) Manzanares
8	FW	Enderson Suárez	9 April 1993 (age 33)	10	(Finland) FC Kemi
9	MF	Carlos Vento	27 February 1997 (age 29)	22	(Spain) Xota FS
10	FW	Wilson Francia	20 October 1992 (age 33)	31	(Venezuela) Caracas Futsal Club
11	MF	Alfredo Vidal	3 February 1994 (age 32)	30	(Peru) Panta Walon
12	GK	José Miguel Villalobos	26 November 1991 (age 34)	55	(Venezuela) Delta Te Quiero
13	MF	Milton Francia	18 December 1994 (age 31)	27	(Venezuela) Pumas de Vargas
14	FW	Rafael Morillo	20 October 1992 (age 33)	21	(Venezuela) Centauros de Caracas
15	GK	Freddy Chacín	6 December 1991 (age 34)	6	(Portugal) Macedense
16	MF	Andrés Terán	27 February 1994 (age 32)	13	(Indonesia) Unggul Futsal Club

== Competitive record ==
=== FIFA Futsal World Cup ===
FIFA Futsal World Cup record
Year	Round	Position	Pld	W	D	L	GS	GA
(Netherlands) 1989	Did not enter							
(Hong Kong) 1992	Did not enter							
(Spain) 1996	Did not qualify							
(Guatemala) 2000	Did not qualify							
(Chinese Taipei) 2004	Did not qualify							
(Brazil) 2008	Did not qualify							
(Thailand) 2012	Did not qualify							
(Colombia) 2016	Did not qualify							
(Lithuania) 2021	Round of 16	9th	4	2	1	1	6	5
(Uzbekistan) 2024	Quarterfinals	8th	5	2	0	3	17	27
Total	2/10		9	4	1	4	23	32

=== Copa América de Futsal ===
- 1992 – Did not enter
- 1995 – Did not enter
- 1996 – 1st round
- 1997 – Did not enter
- 1998 – Did not enter
- 1999 – Did not enter
- 2000 – 1st round
- 2003 – 7th place
- 2008 – 9th place
- 2011 – 7th place
- 2015 – 7th place
- 2017 – 6th place
- 2022 – 6th place
- 2024 – (bronze) 3rd place
- 2026 – 4th place

=== FIFA Futsal World Cup qualification (CONMEBOL)/CONMEBOL Preliminary Competition ===
- 2012 – 8th place
- 2016 – 5th place
- 2021 – 4th place

=== FIFUSA/AMF Futsal World Cup ===
- 1982 - Did not enter
- 1985 - Did not enter
- 1988 - Did not enter
- 1991 - 2nd round
- 1994 - Quarterfinals
- 1997 - (gold) Champions
- 2000 - Did not enter
- 2003 - Did not enter
- 2007 - 1st round
- 2011 - Quarterfinals
- 2015 - 1st round
- 2019 - TBD

=== Grand Prix de Futsal ===
- 2005 – 6th place
- 2006 – Did not enter
- 2007 – Did not enter
- 2008 – 9th place
- 2009 – 9th place
- 2010 – Did not enter
- 2011 – Did not enter
- 2013 – Did not enter
- 2014 – Did not enter
- 2015 – Did not enter
- 2017 – TBD

== Honours ==
- FIFUSA/AMF Futsal World Cup
  - Winners (1): 1997 (gold) Champions

== See also ==
- Venezuela national under-23 football team
- Venezuela national under-20 football team
- Venezuela national under-17 football team
- Venezuela national football team
