= Copa América de Futsal =

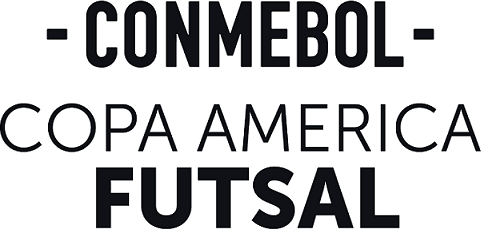
- Organizer(s): CONMEBOL
- Founded: 1992; 34 years ago
- Region: South America
- Teams: 10
- Qualifier for: Futsal Finalissima
- Related competitions: Copa América de Futsal Femenina
- Current champion: Brazil (12th title)
- Most championships: Brazil (12 titles)
- Website: futsalcopaamerica
- 2026 Copa América de Futsal

The CONMEBOL Copa América de Futsal is the main national futsal competition of the CONMEBOL nations. It was first held in 1964 and was organized by the Confederación Sudamericana de Fútbol de Salón (CSFS) and the Asociación Mundial de Futsal (AMF) as "Sudamericano de Futsal". The tournament was also a qualifier for the AMF Futsal World Cup. The CFS and AMF organised the championship until 1989.

In 1992, Conmebol organized its first South American in Aracaju under the name "Campeonato Conmebol de Futsal (FIFA)". In that tournament only 4 national teams participated (Brazil, Argentina, Paraguay and Ecuador) and it was used as a World Cup qualifier as well than the tournaments of 1996 and 2000 that were called with the same name.

The other tournaments played between 1995 and 1999 were played in Brazil and were called "Taça América de Futsal FIFA". The dominance was always of the local team although those tournaments were only competitive without prior classification to any contest.

As of the 2003 edition, it began to be called the "Copa América de Futsal", and the venue of the tournament began to rotate, just as it is done with the traditional Copa América. The first two editions were World Cup qualifying, but Conmebol created the South American Futsal Qualifiers in 2012, which were repeated in 2016 and 2020. Starting in 2024, the Copa América was used again to determine qualification for the FIFA Futsal World Cup.

== Results ==
=== AMF Futsal tournament ===
Not considered official by Conmebol/FIFA

Ed.	Year	Host	Final			Third place match		
Ed.	Year	Host	Champions	Score	Runners-up	Third place	Score	Fourth place
1	1965	Asunción	Paraguay	– (Note: No match held so the tournament was played under a round-robin format.)	Uruguay	Brazil	–	Argentina
2	1969	Asunción	Brazil	–	Paraguay	Argentina	–	Uruguay
3	1971	São Paulo	Brazil	–	Uruguay	Paraguay	–	Peru
4	1973	Montevideo	Brazil	–	Uruguay	Paraguay	–	Argentina
5	1975	Corrientes	Brazil	–	Uruguay	Paraguay	–	Argentina
6	1976	Montevideo	Brazil	–	Paraguay	Uruguay	–	Argentina
7	1977	Porto Alegre	Brazil	–	Paraguay	Colombia	–	Uruguay
8	1979	Bogotá	Brazil	2–0	Uruguay	?		?
9	1983	Montevideo	Brazil	–	Paraguay	Uruguay	–	Argentina
10	1986	Puerto Iguazú	Brazil	–	Paraguay	Argentina	–	Uruguay
11	1989	Aracaju	Brazil	–	Paraguay	Uruguay	–	Bolivia

=== Copa América de Futsal ===
Official tournament

Tournament names and editions

- CONMEBOL Futsal Championship: 1992, 1996, 2000
- Taça América de Futsal: 1995–1999
- Copa América: 2003–present

Ed.	Year	Host	Final			Third place match		
Ed.	Year	Host	Champions	Score	Runners-up	Third place	Score	Fourth place
1	1992	Brazil	Brazil	– (Note: No match held so the tournament was played under a round-robin format.)	Argentina	Paraguay	–	Ecuador
2	1995	Brazil	Brazil	–	Argentina	Uruguay	–	Paraguay
3	1996	Brazil	Brazil	8–1	Uruguay	Argentina	2–1	Paraguay
4	1997	Brazil	Brazil	6–0	Argentina	Paraguay	^{n/a}	Uruguay
5	1998	Brazil	Brazil	9–1	Paraguay	Uruguay	–	Argentina
6	1999	Brazil	Brazil	9–4	Paraguay	Argentina	–	Uruguay
7	2000	Brazil	Brazil	6–0	Argentina	Uruguay	4–2	Bolivia
8	2003	Paraguay	Argentina	–	Brazil	Paraguay	9–4	Uruguay
9	2008	Uruguay	Brazil	6–2	Uruguay	Argentina	3–2	Paraguay
10	2011	Argentina	Brazil	5–1	Argentina	Paraguay	3–1	Colombia
11	2015	Ecuador	Argentina	4–1	Paraguay	Brazil	5–1	Colombia
12	2017	Argentina	Brazil	4–2	Argentina	Paraguay	4–3	Uruguay
–	2019	Chile	Suspended due to 2019–2021 Chilean protests					
13	2022	Paraguay	Argentina	1–0	Paraguay	Brazil	3–0	Colombia
14	2024	Paraguay	Brazil	2–0	Argentina	Venezuela	4–1	Paraguay
15	2026	Paraguay	Brazil	2–1	Argentina	Peru	4–1	Venezuela

== Performance by nations ==
Team	Titles	Runners-up	Third place	Fourth place
Brazil	12 (1992*, 1995*, 1996*, 1997*, 1998*, 1999*, 2000*, 2008, 2011, 2017, 2024, 2026)	1 (2003)	2 (2015, 2022)	
Argentina	3 (2003, 2015, 2022)	8 (1992, 1995, 1997, 2000, 2011*, 2017*, 2024, 2026)	3 (1996, 1999, 2008)	1 (1998)
Paraguay		4 (1998, 1999, 2015, 2022*)	5 (1992, 1997, 2003*, 2011, 2017)	4 (1995, 1996, 2008, 2024*)
Uruguay		2 (1996, 2008*)	3 (1995, 1998, 2000)	4 (1997, 1999, 2003, 2017)
Venezuela			1 (2024)	1 (2026)
Peru			1 (2026)	
Colombia				3 (2011, 2015, 2022)
Bolivia				1 (2000)
Ecuador				1 (1992)

* = hosts

== Medals ==
Rank	Nation	Gold	Silver	Bronze	Total
1	Brazil	12	1	2	15
2	Argentina	3	8	3	14
3	Paraguay	0	4	5	9
4	Uruguay	0	2	3	5
5	Peru	0	0	1	1
5	Venezuela	0	0	1	1
Totals (6 entries)		15	15	15	45

== Participating nations ==
Legend

- 1st – Champions
- 2nd – Runners-up
- 3rd – Third place
- 4th – Fourth place
- 5th-10th – Fifth to Tenth place
- GS – Group stage
- × – Did not enter
- – Hosts

Team	(Brazil) 1992	(Brazil) 1995	(Brazil) 1996	(Brazil) 1997	(Brazil) 1998	(Brazil) 1999	(Brazil) 2000	(Paraguay) 2003	(Uruguay) 2008	(Argentina) 2011	(Ecuador) 2015	(Argentina) 2017	(Paraguay) 2022	(Paraguay) 2024	(Paraguay) 2026	Years
Argentina	2nd	2nd	3rd	2nd	4th	3rd	2nd	1st	3rd	2nd	1st	2nd	1st	2nd	2nd	15
Bolivia	×	×	×	×	×	×	4th	GS	8th	GS	×	7th	8th	9th	10th	8
Brazil	1st	1st	1st	1st	1st	1st	1st	2nd	1st	1st	3rd	1st	3rd	1st	1st	15
Chile	×	×	GS	×	×	×	GS	GS	10th	GS	5th	10th	10th	6th	7th	10
Colombia	×	×	×	×	×	×	×	GS	5th	4th	4th	5th	4th	8th	5th	8
Ecuador	4th	×	×	×	×	×	GS	GS	6th	×	9th	8th	7th	10th	9th	9
Paraguay	3rd	4th	4th	3rd	2nd	2nd	GS	3rd	4th	3rd	2nd	3rd	2nd	4th	8th	15
Peru	×	×	×	×	×	×	GS	GS	7th	GS	8th	9th	9th	7th	3rd	9
Uruguay	×	3rd	2nd	4th	3rd	4th	3rd	4th	2nd	GS	6th	4th	5th	5th	6th	14
Venezuela	×	×	GS	×	×	×	GS	GS	9th	GS	7th	6th	6th	3rd	4th	10
Total	4	4	6	4	4	4	9	10	10	9	9	10	10	10	10	

== Summary table (1992–2024) ==
As of 2024 Copa América de Futsal

Rank	Team	Part	M	W	D	L	GF	GA	GD	Points
1	Brazil	14	64	59	4	1	397	87	+310	181
2	Argentina	14	59	34	11	14	163	124	+39	113
3	Paraguay	14	63	29	9	25	219	193	+26	96
4	Uruguay	13	52	19	7	26	135	170	–35	61
5	Colombia	7	32	15	3	14	89	83	+6	48
6	Venezuela	9	33	12	3	18	77	117	–40	40
7	Peru	8	31	9	2	20	78	137	–59	29
8	Chile	9	34	5	3	26	58	169	–111	18
9	Bolivia	7	28	4	3	21	45	106	–61	15
10	Ecuador	8	28	3	6	21	62	135	–73	15

- Note: this table may not be perfectly precise.
- http://www.futsalplanet.com/
- https://www.rsssf.org/tablesf/futsal-sam.html
- http://old.futsalplanet.com/agenda/agenda-01.asp?id=19137
- http://old.futsalplanet.com/old/turniri/turniri.htm
- http://old.futsalplanet.com/old/Statistics/statistics.htm
- http://old.futsalplanet.com/old/Statistics/data/CONMEBOL.txt
- http://old.futsalplanet.com/agenda/agenda-01.asp?id=20882

== FIFA Futsal World Cup Qualifiers ==
Legend

- 1st – Champions
- 2nd – Runners-up
- 3rd – Third place
- 4th – Fourth place
- QF – Quarterfinals
- R2 – Round 2 (1989–2008, second group stage, top 8; 2012–present: knockout round of 16)
- R1 – Round 1
- – Hosts
- Q – Qualified for upcoming tournament

Team	(Netherlands) 1989	(Hong Kong) 1992	(Spain) 1996	(Guatemala) 2000	(Chinese Taipei) 2004	(Brazil) 2008	(Thailand) 2012	(Colombia) 2016	(Lithuania) 2020	(Uzbekistan) 2024	2028	Total
Argentina	R2	R2	R1	R2	4th	R2	QF	1st	2nd	2nd		10
Brazil	1st	1st	1st	2nd	3rd	1st	1st	R2	3rd	1st		10
Colombia							4th	R2				2
Paraguay	R2	R1			R1	R2	R2	QF	R2	QF		8
Uruguay			R2	R1		R1						3
Venezuela									R2	QF		2

== See also ==
- CONMEBOL Futsal Evolution League
- FIFA Futsal World Cup qualification (CONMEBOL)
- Confederación Panamericana de Futsal (CPFS/PANAFUTSAL) Americas
- Confederación Sudamericana de Futsal (CSFS) South America
- AMF Futsal World Cup
- Panamericana Futsal Clubs Championship
- Copa Libertadores de Futsal
- South American U-20 Futsal Championship
- South American U-17 Futsal Championship
- Copa América Femenina de Futsal
- South American U-20 Women's Futsal Championship
- AMF South American Futsal Championship
- AMF World Cup
- AMF Colombia Futsal Team
- FIFA Colombia Futsal Team
