= Uruguay national futsal team =

Uruguay
- Nickname(s): Los Charrúas; La Celeste (The Sky Blue One); La Garra Charrúa
- Association: AUF
- Confederation: CONMEBOL
- Home stadium: Various
- FIFA code: URU
- FIFA ranking: 28 ▲2 (8 May 2026)
Home colours	Away colours

First international
- Spain 6–0 Uruguay (Alcorcón, Spain; October 19, 1993)

Biggest win
- Chile 1–12 Uruguay (Foz do Iguaçu, Brazil; April 29, 2000)

Biggest defeat
- Brazil 12–0 Uruguay (Joinville, Brazil; October 14, 1999); Brazil 12–0 Uruguay (Manaus, Brazil; October 20, 2011)

FIFA World Cup
- Appearances: 3 (First in 1996)
- Best result: 2nd round (1996)

AMF World Cup
- Appearances: 10 (First in 1982)
- Best result: (silver) 2nd place (1997)

South American Futsal Championship
- Appearances: 25 (First in 1965)
- Best result: (silver) 2nd place (7 times)

Confederations Cup
- Appearances: 1 (First in 2009)
- Best result: 2nd place (2009)

Grand Prix de Futsal
- Appearances: 7 (First in 2005)
- Best result: (bronze) 3rd place (2018)

The Uruguay national futsal team represents Uruguay during international futsal competitions, such as the World Cup and the Copa América. It is governed by the Asociación Uruguaya de Fútbol.

== Squad ==
=== Goalkeepers ===
- 1 Giani Barros
- 12 Mauro Roibal
- 13 Juan Pablo Montans

=== Field players ===
- 2 Fabian Hernandez
- 3 Santiago Blankleider
- 4 Jorge Sena
- 5 Gonzalo Rodriguez
- 6 Daniel Laurino
- 7 Walter Skurko
- 8 Miguel Aguirrezabala
- 9 Nicolas Moliterno
- 10 Andres D'Alessandro
- 11 Martin Hernandez
- 14 Gabriel De Simone

== Results ==
=== FIFUSA/AMF Futsal World Cup record ===
- 1982 – (bronze) 3rd place
- 1985 – 5th place
- 1988 – 5th place
- 1991 – 10th place
- 1994 – (bronze) 3rd place
- 1997 – (silver) 2nd place
- 2000 – 2nd round
- 2003 – Did not play
- 2007 – 1st round
- 2011 – 1st round
- 2015 – Quarterfinals
- 2019 – To be determined

=== FIFA Futsal World Cup record ===
- 1989 - Did not enter
- 1992 - Did not enter
- 1996 - 2nd round
- 2000 - 1st round
- 2004 - Did not play
- 2008 - 1st round
- 2012 - Did not play
- 2016 - Did not play
- 2021 - Did not qualify
- 2024 - Did not qualify

=== Copa América de Futsal ===
- 1965 - (silver) 2nd place
- 1969 - 4th place
- 1971 - (silver) 2nd place
- 1973 - (silver) 2nd place
- 1975 - (silver) 2nd place
- 1976 - (bronze) 3rd place
- 1977 - 4th place
- 1979 - (silver) 2nd place
- 1983 - (bronze) 3rd place
- 1986 - 4th place
- 1989 - (bronze) 3rd place
- 1992 – Did not play
- 1995 – (bronze) 3rd place
- 1996 – (silver) 2nd place
- 1997 – 4th place
- 1998 – (bronze) 3rd place
- 1999 – 4th place
- 2000 – (bronze) 3rd place
- 2003 – 4th place
- 2008 – (silver) 2nd place
- 2011 – 5th place
- 2015 – 6th place
- 2017 – 4th place
- 2022 – 5th place
- 2024 – 5th place
- 2026 – 6th place

=== FIFA Futsal World Cup qualification (CONMEBOL)/CONMEBOL Preliminary Competition ===
- 2012 – 5th place
- 2016 – 4th place

=== Futsal Confederations Cup record ===
- 2009 – 2nd place
- 2013 – Did not enter
- 2014 – Did not enter

=== Grand Prix de Futsal record ===
- 2005 – 4th place
- 2006 – Did not enter
- 2007 – 7th place
- 2008 – 11th place
- 2009 – 13th place
- 2010 – Did not enter
- 2011 – 7th place
- 2013 – Did not enter
- 2014 – Did not enter
- 2015 – 5th place
- 2018 – (bronze) 3rd place

=== Futsal Mundialito record ===
- 1994 – Did not enter
- 1995 – Did not enter
- 1996 – Did not enter
- 1998 – Did not enter
- 2001 – 1st round
- 2002 – Did not enter
- 2006 – Did not enter
- 2007 – Did not enter
- 2008 – Did not enter

== See also ==
- Uruguay national football team
- Uruguay national under-23 football team
- Uruguay national under-20 football team
- Uruguay national under-18 football team
- Uruguay national under-17 football team
- Uruguay national under-15 football team
- Uruguay local national football team
