= Peru national futsal team =

Peru
- Shirt badge/Association crest
- Nickname(s): La Blanquirroja (The White and Red); Los Incas (The Incas)
- Association: F.P.F.
- Confederation: CONMEBOL (South America)
- Head coach: Pedro Sandoval Boudri
- Asst coach: Duílio Gamio Cisneros
- FIFA code: PER
- FIFA ranking: 34 ▲15 (8 May 2026)
Home colours	Away colours

First international
- Hungary 8–3 Peru (Budapest, Hungary, 18 November 1986)

Biggest win
- Peru 9–1 Bolivia (Lima, Peru, 22 November 2013)

Biggest defeat
- Brazil 13–2 Peru (Foz do Iguaçu, Brazil, 29 April 2000)

AMF World Cup
- Appearances: 3 (First in 2003)
- Best result: 4th (2003, 2007)

South American Futsal Championship
- Appearances: 9 (First in 1971)
- Best result: (bronze) Third place (2026)

Grand Prix de Futsal
- Appearances: 2 (First in 2008)
- Best result: 11th (2009)

The Peru national futsal team represents Peru in international futsal competitions, such as the World Cup and the Copa América. It is governed by the Federación Peruana de Futbol (FPF).

== Tournament records ==
=== FIFA Futsal World Cup ===
- 1989 - Did not enter
- 1992 - Did not enter
- 1996 - Did not enter
- 2000 - Did not qualify
- 2004 - Did not qualify
- 2008 - Did not qualify
- 2012 - Did not qualify
- 2016 - Did not qualify
- 2021 - Did not qualify
- 2024 - Did not qualify

=== FIFUSA/AMF Futsal World Cup ===
- 1982 – Did not enter
- 1985 – Did not enter
- 1988 – Did not enter
- 1991 – Did not enter
- 1994 – Did not enter
- 1997 – Did not enter
- 2000 – Did not enter
- 2003 – 4th place
- 2007 – 4th place
- 2011 – Quarterfinals
- 2015 – Did not enter
- 2019 – TBD

=== Copa América de Futsal ===
- 1965 - Did not enter
- 1969 - Did not enter
- 1971 - 4th place
- 1973 - Did not enter
- 1975 - Did not enter
- 1976 - Did not enter
- 1977 - Did not enter
- 1979 - Did not enter
- 1983 - Did not enter
- 1986 - Did not enter
- 1989 - Did not enter
- 1992 – Did not enter
- 1995 – Did not enter
- 1996 – Did not enter
- 1997 – Did not enter
- 1998 – Did not enter
- 1999 – Did not enter
- 2000 – 1st round
- 2003 – 6th place
- 2008 – 7th place
- 2011 – 1st round
- 2015 – 8th place
- 2017 – 9th place
- 2022 – 9th place
- 2024 – 7th place
- 2026 – (bronze) Third place

=== FIFA Futsal World Cup qualification (CONMEBOL)/CONMEBOL Preliminary Competition ===
- 2012 – 7th place
- 2016 – 10th place

=== Grand Prix de Futsal ===
- 2005 – did not enter
- 2006 – did not enter
- 2007 – did not enter
- 2008 – 15th place
- 2009 – 11th place
- 2010 – did not enter
- 2011 – did not enter
- 2013 – did not enter
- 2014 – did not enter
- 2015 – did not enter
- 2017 – TBD

== Current squad ==
- Players called up for the Grand Prix of Futsal 2009 held in Brazil.
- Coach: Pedro Sandoval

#	Name	Pos	DOB	Club
1	Edson (Edson Caceres)	GK	28 Dec 1977	Deportívo América
2	Salerno (Luís Salerno Reyes)	WG	15 Dec 1988	Tigregraph
3	Cesar (Cesar Fernández Valverde)	FP	19 Nov 1982	Grasshoppers
4	Diego (Diego Nalvarte Reatequi)	WG	25 May 1984	San Ignacio de Loyola
5	Carlos (Carlos Luna Herrera)	WG	26 Feb 1984	Grasshoppers
6	Luis (Luís Becerra Vilela)	PV	16 Sep 1974	Deportivo América
7	Tony (Toni Alvarado Estrada)	PV	17 Jun 1986	Tigregraph
8	Iván (Edgar Ivan Ubilluz Pezo)	WG	2 Mar 1984	Deportivo JAP
9	Manolo (Enrique Manuel Caldas Fernández)	PV	28 Dec 1974	Deportivo Ingeniería
10	Juan (Juan Sutta Soria)	FP	16 Apr 1974	Deportivo JAP
11	Marcos (Marcos Canto Lavalle)	FP	9 Sep 1985	Grasshoppers
12	Alonso (Julio Tizón Silva)	GK	3 Mar 1987	Deportivo JAP
13	Marvin (Marvin Fuertes Salvador)	WG	4 Apr 1987	Deportivo América
