= Argentina national futsal team =

Argentina
- Shirt badge/Association crest
- Nickname(s): La Albiceleste los Murciélagos
- Association: Argentine Football Association
- Confederation: CONMEBOL (South America)
- Head coach: Matías Lucuix
- Captain: Maximiliano Rescia
- FIFA code: ARG
- FIFA ranking: 4 (24 September 2026)
- Highest FIFA ranking: 3 (October 2024)
- Lowest FIFA ranking: 5 (May 2024)
Home colours	Away colours

First international
- Portugal 3–4 Argentina (Brasília, Brazil; 14 September 1987)

Biggest win
- Indonesia 1–20 Argentina (Kuala Lumpur, Malaysia; 4 June 2003)

Biggest defeat
- Brazil 14–1 Argentina (Santos, Brazil; 14 March 1999)

FIFA World Cup
- Appearances: 10 (First in 1989)
- Best result: (gold) Champions (2016)

AMF World Cup
- Appearances: 12 (First in 1982)
- Best result: (gold) Champions (1994, 2019)

South American Futsal Championship
- Appearances: 11 (First in 1992)
- Best result: (gold) Champions (2003, 2015, 2022)

Confederations Cup
- Appearances: 1 (First in 2014)
- Best result: Champions (2014)

Grand Prix de Futsal
- Appearances: 8 (First in 2005)
- Best result: (silver) Runner-up (2008)

Argentina national futsal team
Medal record

FIFA Futsal World Cup
Gold medal – first place	2016 Colombia	Team
Silver medal – second place	2021 Lithuania	Team
Silver medal – second place	2024 Uzbekistan	Team

AMF Futsal World Cup
Gold medal – first place	1994 Argentina	
Gold medal – first place	2019 Argentina	
Silver medal – second place	2007 Argentina	
Bronze medal – third place	2000 Bolivia	
Bronze medal – third place	2011 Colombia	
Bronze medal – third place	2015 Belarus	

The Argentina national futsal team represents Argentina during international futsal competitions. It is governed by the Argentine Football Association.

Argentina has qualified and participated in all eight FIFA Futsal World Cup tournaments and along with Brazil, Spain and Portugal are the only national teams that have won the FIFA Futsal World Cup, having won it in 2016. Argentina has also won the Copa América three times, in 2003, 2015 and 2022. Argentina is ranked 4th in the FIFA Futsal World Rankings.

In FIFUSA/AMF, Argentina won the 1994 FIFUSA Futsal World Cup and 2019 AMF Futsal Men's World Cup.

In IBSA, los Murciélagos have been crowned world champions twice in the Blind Soccer/Futsal World Championship, and in 2015 won its third world title: the IBSA World Games 2015. Los Murciélagos also won the Blind Futsal Copa Amèrica. Only Brazil and Argentina have won the Blind Futsal Copa Amèrica.

== Results and fixtures ==
The following is a list of match results in the last 12 months, as well as any future matches that have been scheduled.

Legend

Win Draw Lose Fixture

== Team ==
=== Current squad ===
The following players were called up to the Argentina squad for the 2022 Futsal Finalissima.
Head coach: Matías Lucuix

No.	Pos.	Player	Date of birth (age)	Caps	Club
1	GK	Nicolás Sarmiento	3 December 1992 (age 33)		(Spain) Real Betis Futsal
2	DF	Lucas Tripodi	18 June 1994 (age 32)		(Spain) Inter Movistar
3	MF	Ángel Claudino	8 December 1995 (age 30)		(Spain) Viña Albali Valdepeñas
4	MF	Lucas Bolo	12 March 1992 (age 34)		(Spain) Córdoba CF
5	DF	Maximiliano Rescia (captain)	29 October 1987 (age 38)		(Belgium) Anderlecht
6	DF	Sebastián Corso	12 February 1992 (age 34)		(Spain) Industrias Santa Coloma
7	MF	Gerardo Menzeguez	23 April 1993 (age 33)		(Spain) Jaén FS
8	MF	Santiago Basile	25 July 1988 (age 38)		(Argentina) Boca Juniors
9	FW	Cristian Borruto	7 May 1987 (age 39)		(Argentina) Boca Juniors
10	MF	Constantino Vaporaki	6 January 1990 (age 36)		(Italy) Meta Catania
11	FW	Alan Brandi	24 November 1987 (age 38)		(Spain) Jaén FS
12	GK	Matías Starna	26 January 1999 (age 27)		(Spain) Peñíscola FS
14	MF	Pablo Taborda	3 September 1986 (age 40)		(Spain) Jaén FS
16	MF	Matías Edelstein	18 June 1992 (age 34)		(Argentina) Hebraica

=== Recent call-ups ===
The following players have also been called up to the squad within the last 12 months.

Pos.	Player	Date of birth (age)	Caps	Goals	Club	Latest call-up
^{COV} Player withdrew from the squad due to contracting COVID-19.^{INJ} Player withdrew from the squad due to an injury.^{PRE} Preliminary squad.^{RET} Retired from international futsal.

== Competitive record ==
Champions Runners up Third place Fourth place

=== FIFA Futsal ===
==== FIFA Futsal World Cup ====
FIFA Futsal World Cup record
Years	Round	Position	Pld	W	D	L	GS	GA
(Netherlands) 1989	Second round	8th	6	2	0	4	13	18
(Hong Kong) 1992	Second round	6th	6	3	0	3	16	20
(Spain) 1996	First round	9th	3	1	1	1	7	9
(Guatemala) 2000	Second round	7th	6	3	0	3	16	19
(Taiwan) 2004	Fourth place	4th	8	4	1	3	21	18
(Brazil) 2008	Second round	6th	7	3	3	1	19	12
(Thailand) 2012	Quarter-finals	5th	5	3	0	2	18	9
(Colombia) 2016	Champions	1st	7	6	1	0	26	11
(Lithuania) 2021	Runners-up	2nd	7	5	1	1	27	8
(Uzbekistan) 2024	Runners-up	2nd	7	6	0	1	30	12
Total	1 title	10/10	62	36	7	19	193	136

==== Futsal Finalissima ====
Futsal Finalissima record
Years	Round	Position	Pld	W	D	L	GS	GA
(Argentina) 2022	Fourth place	4th	2	0	0	2	2	6
Total	-	1/1	2	0	0	2	2	6

==== Copa América de Futsal ====
Copa América de Futsal record
Years	Round	Position	Pld	W	D	L	GS	GA
(Brazil) 1992	Runners-up	2nd	3	1	1	1	6	6
(Brazil) 1995	Runners-up	2nd	3	2	0	1	11	9
(Brazil) 1996	Third place	3rd	4	1	2	1	5	10
(Brazil) 1997	Runners-up	2nd	4	2	0	2	11	16
(Brazil) 1998	Fourth place	4th	3	0	0	3	4	8
(Brazil) 1999	Third place	3rd	3	1	0	2	6	11
(Brazil) 2000	Runners-up	2nd	4	3	0	1	9	11
(Paraguay) 2003	Champions	1st	5	4	1	0	21	9
(Uruguay) 2008	Third place	3rd	4	3	0	1	10	8
(Argentina) 2011	Runners-up	2nd	5	3	1	1	20	11
(Ecuador) 2015	Champions	1st	6	3	2	1	20	11
(Argentina) 2017	Runners-up	2nd	6	4	1	1	26	9
(Paraguay) 2022	Champions	1st	6	4	2	0	16	9
(Paraguay) 2024	Runners-up	2nd	6	4	0	2	12	7
(Paraguay) 2026	Runners-up	2nd	6	4	1	1	17	5
Total	3 titles	15/15	65	37	11	17	185	136

==== FIFA Futsal World Cup qualification (CONMEBOL) ====
FIFA Futsal World Cup qualification record
Years	Round	Position	Pld	W	D	L	GS	GA
(Brazil) 2012	Champions	1st	6	4	1	1	18	6
(Paraguay) 2016	Runners-up	2nd	6	4	1	1	23	9
(Brazil) 2020	Champions	1st	6	6	0	0	19	4
Total	2 titles	3/3	18	14	2	2	60	19

==== Futsal Confederations Cup ====
Confederations Cup record
Years	Round	Position	Pld	W	D	L	GS	GA
(History of Libya under Muammar Gaddafi) 2009	Did not enter							
(Brazil) 2013	Did not enter							
(Kuwait) 2014	Champions	1st	5	4	0	1	23	8
(Thailand) 2022	Did not enter							
Total	1 title	1/4	5	4	0	1	23	8

==== Pan American Games ====
Pan American Games record
Years	Round	Position	Pld	W	D	L	GS	GA
(Brazil) 2007	Runners-up	2nd	5	2	2	1	13	8
Total	-	1/1	5	2	2	1	13	8

==== South American Games ====
South American Games record
Years	Round	Position	Pld	W	D	L	GS	GA
(Brazil) 2002	Final	2nd	6	4	0	2	14	12
(Argentina) 2006	Semifinals	3rd	6	3	2	1	18	8
(Chile) 2014	Round-robin	2nd	5	4	0	1	15	8
(Bolivia) 2018	Round-robin	3rd	5	4	0	1	13	7
(Paraguay) 2022	Round-robin	1st	5	4	1	0	14	3
Total	1 title	5/8	27	19	3	5	74	38

==== Grand Prix de Futsal ====
Grand Prix de Futsal record
Years	Round	Position	Pld	W	D	L	GS	GA
(Brazil) 2005	Semifinals	3rd	4	2	0	2	7	7
(Brazil) 2006	Semifinals	4th	4	1	1	2	2	4
(Brazil) 2007	Semifinals	3rd	5	4	0	1	27	9
(Brazil) 2008	Final	2nd	6	4	1	1	15	8
(Brazil) 2009	Quarterfinals	5th	4	3	1	0	14	8
(Brazil) 2010	Quarterfinals	7th	4	1	1	2	9	9
(Brazil) 2011	Semifinals	3rd	6	4	1	1	26	14
(Brazil) 2013	Final Round	5th	4	2	1	1	7	15
(Brazil) 2014	Did not enter							
(Brazil) 2015	Did not enter							
(Brazil) 2018	Did not enter							
Total	Runner Up	8/11	37	21	6	10	107	74

==== Futsal Mundialito ====
Futsal Mundialito record
Year	Position	Pld	W	D	L	GF	GA
(Italy) 1994	Did not enter						
(Brazil) 1995	5th	2	0	0	2	1	13
(Brazil) 1996	3rd	2	1	0	1	3	2
(Brazil) 1998	2nd	5	2	1	2	11	10
(Brazil) 2001	2nd	4	2	1	1	11	7
(Italy) 2002	4th	5	2	1	2	13	12
(Portugal) 2006	Did not enter						
(Portugal) 2007	Did not enter						
(Portugal) 2008	Did not enter						
Total	-	18	7	3	8	39	44

Note: Draws include knockout matches decided on penalty kicks.

==== South American U-20 Futsal Championship ====
South American U-20 Futsal Championship record
Years	Round	Position	Pld	W	D	L	GS	GA
(Brazil) 2004	First round	5th	4	2	0	2	9	9
(Venezuela) 2006	Runners-up	2nd	5	3	0	2	10	7
(Colombia) 2008	Runners-up	2nd	5	3	1	1	18	10
(Colombia) 2010	Third place	3rd	5	3	1	1	15	7
(Venezuela) 2013	Third place	3rd	5	4	1	0	15	6
(Brazil) 2014	Third place	3rd	6	3	3	0	31	15
(Uruguay) 2016	Champions	1st	6	5	1	0	30	7
(Peru) 2018	Runners-up	2nd	6	4	1	1	24	16
(Venezuela) 2022	Runners-up	2nd	6	4	0	2	15	5
(Peru) 2024	Champions	1st	6	4	2	0	22	11
Total	2 titles	10/10	54	35	10	9	189	93

==== South American U-17 Futsal Championship ====
South American U-17 Futsal Championship record
Years	Round	Position	Pld	W	D	L	GS	GA
(Brazil) 2016	Runners-up	2nd	6	4	1	1	24	9
(Paraguay) 2022	Champions	1st	6	5	1	0	19	3
(Paraguay) 2024	Champions	1st	6	6	0	0	23	3
(Paraguay) 2026	Champions	1st	6	5	0	1	23	5
Total	3 titles	4/4	24	20	2	2	65	11

=== AMF/FIFUSA Futsal ===
==== AMF/FIFUSA Futsal World Cup ====
AMF Futsal World Cup record
Years	Round	Position	Pld	W	D	L	GS	GA
(Brazil) 1982	First round	7th	4	1	1	2	7	14
(Spain) 1985	Fourth place	4th	6	3	0	3	23	29
(Australia) 1988	Second round	7th	6	2	1	3	28	31
(Italy) 1991	Quarter-finals	5th	7	5	0	2	31	12
(Argentina) 1994	Champions	1st	9	9	0	0	30	4
(Mexico) 1997	Quarter-finals	8th	6	2	1	3	26	7
(Bolivia) 2000	Third place	3rd	8	3	2	3	25	27
(Paraguay) 2003	Quarter-finals	6th	4	3	0	1	26	12
(Argentina) 2007	Runners-up	2nd	6	5	0	1	32	15
(Colombia) 2011	Third place	3rd	6	4	1	1	31	17
(Belarus) 2015	Third place	3rd	6	4	1	1	24	6
(Argentina) 2019	Champions	1st	6	6	0	0	44	7
(Mexico) 2023	Did not participate							
Total	2 titles	12/13	74	47	7	20	327	181

==== FIFUSA/AMF Futsal U-20 World Cup ====
Futsal U-20 World Cup record
Years	Round	Position	Pld	W	D	L	GS	GA
(Chile) 2014	Champions	1st	6	6	0	0	46	9
(Colombia) 2018	Runners-up	2nd	6	5	0	1	23	13
Total	1 title	2/2	12	11	0	1	69	22

=== IBSA Futsal ===
==== IBSA Blind Futsal World Championship ====
IBSA Blind Futsal World Championship record
Years	Round	Position	Pld	W	D	L	GS	GA
(Brazil) 1998	Runners-up	2nd	4	2	1	1	4	2
(Spain) 2000	Runners-up	2nd	5	3	1	1	7	5
(Brazil) 2002	Champions	1st	5	5	0	0	15	3
(Argentina) 2006	Champions	1st	5	4	1	0	12	2
(England) 2010	First round	7th	5	2	2	1	4	2
(Japan) 2014	Runners-up	2nd	6	3	2	1	4	2
(Spain) 2018	Runners-up	2nd	6	3	2	1	6	3
(England) 2023	Champions	1st	6	3	3	0	6	1
Total	3 titles	8/8	42	25	12	5	58	20

==== IBSA World Games ====
- 2015 – (gold) Champions

==== 4Nations World Series Jakarta 2025 ====
- 2025 – (gold) Champions

== See also ==
- Argentina women's national futsal team (women's national team)
