= 2021 FIFA Futsal World Cup =

International futsal event

Pasaulio Salės Futbolo Čempionatas (Lithuanian) Lithuania 2021

Tournament details
- Host country: Lithuania
- Dates: 12 September – 3 October
- Teams: 24 (from 6 confederations)
- Venues: 3 (in 3 host cities)

Final positions
- Champions: Portugal (1st title)
- Runners-up: Argentina
- Third place: Brazil
- Fourth place: Kazakhstan

Tournament statistics
- Matches played: 52
- Goals scored: 301 (5.79 per match)
- Attendance: 63,748 (1,226 per match)
- Top scorer(s): (Brazil) Ferrão (9 goals)
- Best player: (Portugal) Ricardinho
- Best goalkeeper: (Argentina) Nicolás Sarmiento
- Fair play award: Kazakhstan

The 2021 FIFA Futsal World Cup was the ninth edition of the FIFA Futsal World Cup, the quadrennial international futsal championship contested by the men's national teams of the member associations of FIFA. The tournament was held in Lithuania. It marked the first FIFA tournament ever hosted by Lithuania and the third Futsal World Cup hosted in Europe; the others being 1989 in the Netherlands and 1996 in Spain.

The tournament was originally scheduled to be held from 12 September to 4 October 2020 as the 2020 FIFA Futsal World Cup. However, due to the COVID-19 pandemic, FIFA announced on 3 April 2020 that a decision would be made whether the tournament would be postponed and rescheduled. On 12 May 2020, FIFA announced that the tournament would be held between 12 September and 3 October 2021, subject to further monitoring.

In the final, Portugal defeated the defending champions Argentina 2–1 to win their first World Cup title. They became the fourth team to win the competition, the second from Europe after Spain's triumphs in 2000 and 2004.

== Host selection ==
The following countries bid for the tournament:

- Costa Rica
- Croatia
- Iran
- Japan
- Kazakhstan
- Lithuania
- New Zealand
- United Arab Emirates

The eight bidders represent the highest ever for the FIFA Futsal World Cup. Since none of these countries have ever hosted the event before, the tournament will be heading to a new location, later shortlisted to four. The Czech Republic, Egypt, Georgia, the Netherlands and the United States expressed interest but eventually did not bid.

The host were originally to be appointed by December 2016, then delayed to December 2017. Costa Rica, Croatia, Kazakhstan and the United Arab Emirates were later eliminated from contention.

The hosts were selected by the FIFA Council on 26 October 2018 in Kigali, Rwanda from the final four candidates: Iran, Japan, Lithuania and New Zealand. Lithuania was chosen over Iran, Japan and New Zealand as host for the 2020 edition.

== Qualification ==
A total of 24 teams from six separate continental competitions qualified for the final tournament, in addition to hosts Lithuania. The slot allocation was approved by the FIFA Council on 10 June 2018.

Confederation	Qualified through	Team	Appearance	Last appearance	Previous best performance
AFC (Asia) (5 teams)	Three teams nominated by AFC, two teams determined by play-offs (Original championship cancelled)	Iran	8th	2016	Third place (2016)
AFC (Asia) (5 teams)	Three teams nominated by AFC, two teams determined by play-offs (Original championship cancelled)	Japan	5th	2012	Round of 16 (2012)
AFC (Asia) (5 teams)	Three teams nominated by AFC, two teams determined by play-offs (Original championship cancelled)	Uzbekistan	2nd	2016	Group stage (2016)
AFC (Asia) (5 teams)	Three teams nominated by AFC, two teams determined by play-offs (Original championship cancelled)	Thailand	6th	2016	Round of 16 (2012, 2016)
AFC (Asia) (5 teams)	Three teams nominated by AFC, two teams determined by play-offs (Original championship cancelled)	Vietnam	2nd	2016	Round of 16 (2016)
CAF (Africa) (3 teams)	2020 Africa Futsal Cup of Nations	Angola	1st	N/A	Debut
CAF (Africa) (3 teams)	2020 Africa Futsal Cup of Nations	Egypt	7th	2016	Quarter-finals (2016)
CAF (Africa) (3 teams)	2020 Africa Futsal Cup of Nations	Morocco	3rd	2016	Group stage (2012, 2016)
CONCACAF (Central, North America and Caribbean) (4 teams)	2021 CONCACAF Futsal Championship				
CONCACAF (Central, North America and Caribbean) (4 teams)	2021 CONCACAF Futsal Championship	Costa Rica	5th	2016	Round of 16 (2016)
CONCACAF (Central, North America and Caribbean) (4 teams)	2021 CONCACAF Futsal Championship	Guatemala	5th	2016	Group stage (2000, 2008, 2012, 2016)
CONCACAF (Central, North America and Caribbean) (4 teams)	2021 CONCACAF Futsal Championship	Panama	3rd	2016	Round of 16 (2012)
CONCACAF (Central, North America and Caribbean) (4 teams)	2021 CONCACAF Futsal Championship	United States	6th	2008	Runners-up (1992)
CONMEBOL (South America) (4 teams)	2020 FIFA Futsal World Cup qualification (CONMEBOL)	Argentina	9th	2016	Champions (2016)
CONMEBOL (South America) (4 teams)	2020 FIFA Futsal World Cup qualification (CONMEBOL)	Brazil	9th	2016	Champions (1989, 1992, 1996, 2008, 2012)
CONMEBOL (South America) (4 teams)	2020 FIFA Futsal World Cup qualification (CONMEBOL)	Paraguay	7th	2016	Quarter-finals (2016)
CONMEBOL (South America) (4 teams)	2020 FIFA Futsal World Cup qualification (CONMEBOL)	Venezuela	1st	N/A	Debut
OFC (Oceania) (1 team)	2019 OFC Futsal Nations Cup	Solomon Islands	4th	2016	Group stage (2008, 2012, 2016)
UEFA (Europe) (Hosts + 6 teams)	Host nation	Lithuania	1st	N/A	Debut
UEFA (Europe) (Hosts + 6 teams)	2020 FIFA Futsal World Cup qualification (UEFA)	Kazakhstan	3rd	2016	Round of 16 (2016)
UEFA (Europe) (Hosts + 6 teams)	2020 FIFA Futsal World Cup qualification (UEFA)	Portugal	6th	2016	Third place (2000)
UEFA (Europe) (Hosts + 6 teams)	2020 FIFA Futsal World Cup qualification (UEFA)	RFU	7th	2016	Runners-up (2016)
UEFA (Europe) (Hosts + 6 teams)	2020 FIFA Futsal World Cup qualification (UEFA)	Spain	9th	2016	Champions (2000, 2004)
UEFA (Europe) (Hosts + 6 teams)	2020 FIFA Futsal World Cup qualification (UEFA)	Czech Republic	4th	2012	Round of 16 (2012)
UEFA (Europe) (Hosts + 6 teams)	2020 FIFA Futsal World Cup qualification (UEFA)	Serbia	2nd	2012	Round of 16 (2012)

1. Note RUS: In accordance with the ban by the World Anti-Doping Agency and a December 2020 decision by the Court of Arbitration for Sport, the team from Russia participated at the tournament as neutral athletes of the Russian Football Union (RFU) and used the flag of the Russian Olympic Committee.

== Venues ==
Lithuania presented three cities – Vilnius (Avia Solutions Group Arena), Kaunas (Žalgiris Arena) and Klaipėda (Švyturys Arena) in their bid to host the event. During press conference on 22 November 2018 it was revealed that the Lithuanian Football Federation would like to expand number of host cities with up to 3 additional locations. Šiauliai (Šiauliai Arena), Panevėžys (Cido Arena) and Alytus (Alytus Arena) were named as additional candidates and are currently awaiting for a FIFA delegates inspection to determine their suitability. Further negotiations should resume in February 2019. An inspection was done on 10 May 2019 on all five potential host cities: Vilnius (Siemens Arena), Kaunas (Žalgiris Arena), Klaipėda (Švyturys Arena), Šiauliai (Šiauliai Arena) and Panevėžys (Cido Arena).

The final decision was made on 16 October 2019, it will be staged in three cities: Vilnius (Avia Solutions Group Arena), Kaunas (Žalgiris Arena) and Klaipėda (Švyturys Arena). Šiauliai (Šiauliai Arena) and Panevėžys (Cido Arena) were left out due to accommodation hotel concerns.

Vilnius	Kaunas	Klaipėda
Avia Solutions Group Arena	Žalgiris Arena	Švyturys Arena
Capacity: 10,000	Capacity: 13,807	Capacity: 6,200
2021 FIFA Futsal World Cup is located in Lithuania

== Marketing ==
The Emblem was launched on 17 January 2020 at the MO Museum in Vilnius.

The emblem highlights two of Lithuania's features: its natural resources and technological expertise. The base of the emblem represents the country's landscape, decorated with oak leaves. A symbol of strength, the native oak has been venerated in Lithuania for centuries. Following the lines of the FIFA Futsal World Cup Trophy, oaks give way to farmland and meadows in the colours of the Lithuanian flag. The prominence given to the landscape highlights Lithuania's commitment to the preservation of its natural heritage.

The top half of the emblem is inspired by Lithuania's modern technological industries. Lasers shoot skywards towards a stylised futsal pitch as a reminder of the country's accomplishments in the science and high-tech industries.

On 21 September 2020, Ivartito, a stork (which is the national bird of Lithuania since 1973), was unveiled as the official mascot.

== Draw ==
The official draw was held on 1 June 2021, 17:00 CEST (UTC+2), at the FIFA headquarters in Zürich, Switzerland. The 24 teams were drawn into six groups of four teams. The hosts Lithuania were automatically seeded into Pot 1 and assigned to position A1, while the remaining teams were seeded into their respective pots based on their results in the last five FIFA Futsal World Cups (more recent tournaments weighted more heavily), with bonus points awarded to confederation champions. No group could contain more than one team from each confederation, except there would be one group with two UEFA teams due to there being seven UEFA teams in total.

Pot 1	Pot 2	Pot 3	Pot 4
Lithuania (assigned to A1); Spain; Brazil; Argentina; RFU; Portugal	Iran; Paraguay; Egypt; Costa Rica; Thailand; Czech Republic	Solomon Islands; Japan; Guatemala; Kazakhstan; Serbia; Panama	Morocco; Vietnam; United States; Uzbekistan; Angola; Venezuela

== Match officials ==
The following officials were chosen for the tournament. For the very first time in a FIFA international tournament, the Video Support (VS) was implemented

Confederation	Referees
AFC	(Bahrain) Hussain Ali Al-Bahhar
AFC	(United Arab Emirates) Fahad Badir Ali Mohamed Alhosani
AFC	(Kyrgyzstan) Nurdin Bukuev
AFC	(Australia) Ryan Shepheard
AFC	(Japan) Tomohiro Kozaki
AFC	(China) Ran An
AFC	(Iran) Ebrahim Mehrabi Afshar
AFC	(Iran) Gelareh Nazemi Deylami
CAF	(Egypt) Tarek Elkhataby
CAF	(Egypt) Mohamed Youssef
CAF	(Morocco) Khalid Hnich
CAF	(Tunisia) Aymen Kammoun
CONCACAF	(Panama) Roberto Enrique López Fernández
CONCACAF	(Costa Rica) Ronny Castro Zumbado
CONCACAF	(El Salvador) Jorge Flores
CONCACAF	(Guatemala) Carlos González
CONCACAF	(Costa Rica) Diego Molina López
CONCACAF	(United States) Josh Wilkens

Confederation	Referees
CONMEBOL	(Chile) Cristian Espindola
CONMEBOL	(Chile) Valeria Palma
CONMEBOL	(Argentina) María Estefanía Pinto
CONMEBOL	(Uruguay) Daniel Rodríguez
CONMEBOL	(Argentina) Dario Santamaria
CONMEBOL	(Brazil) Gean Telles
CONMEBOL	(Bolivia) Henry Gutiérrez
CONMEBOL	(Paraguay) Carlos Martínez
OFC	(New Zealand) Anthony Riley
OFC	(New Zealand) Chris Sinclair
UEFA	(Spain) Juan José Cordero Gallardo
UEFA	(Czech Republic) Ondřej Černý
UEFA	(Hungary) Gábor Kovács
UEFA	(Portugal) Eduardo Fernandes
UEFA	(Spain) Alejandro Martínez Flores
UEFA	(Switzerland) Daniel Matković
UEFA	(Italy) Chiara Perona
UEFA	(France) Cédric Pelissier
UEFA	(Russia) Irina Velikanova
UEFA	(Croatia) Nikola Jelić
UEFA	(Bulgaria) Borislav Kolev (support)

== Squads ==
Each team has to name a preliminary squad of a maximum of 25 players (3 of whom must be goalkeepers). From the preliminary squad, the team has to name a final squad of 14 players (two of whom must be goalkeepers) by the FIFA deadline. Players in the final squad can be replaced by a player from the preliminary squad due to serious injury or illness up to 24 hours prior to kickoff of the team's first match.

== Group stage ==
The schedule of the competition was released on 30 April 2021.

The top two teams of each group and the four best third-placed teams advance to the round of 16.

Tiebreakers

The rankings of teams in each group are determined as follows:

1. points obtained in all group matches;
2. goal difference in all group matches;
3. number of goals scored in all group matches;

If two or more teams are equal on the basis of the above three criteria, their rankings are determined as follows:

4. points obtained in the group matches between the teams concerned;
5. goal difference in the group matches between the teams concerned;
6. number of goals scored in the group matches between the teams concerned;
7. fair play points in all group matches (only one deduction could be applied to a player in a single match):
  - Yellow card: −1 points;
  - Indirect red card (second yellow card): −3 points;
  - Direct red card: −4 points;
  - Yellow card and direct red card: −5 points;
8. drawing of lots by the FIFA Organising Committee.

All times are local, EEST (UTC+3).

=== Group A ===
Pos	Team	Pld	W	D	L	GF	GA	GD	Pts	Qualification
1	Kazakhstan	3	2	1	0	10	2	+8	7	Advance to the knockout stage
2	Venezuela	3	2	1	0	4	2	+2	7	Advance to the knockout stage
3	Costa Rica	3	1	0	2	7	9	−2	3	
4	Lithuania (H)	3	0	0	3	3	11	−8	0	

Source: FIFA
Rules for classification: Tiebreakers
(H) Hosts
12 September 2021
18:00

Kazakhstan	6–1	Costa Rica
Yessenamanov 10'; Tursagulov 11'; Douglas Jr. 14'; Taynan 17', 27'; Orazov 27'	Report	Rodríguez 12'

Žalgiris Arena, Kaunas
Attendance: 950
Referee: Mohamed Hassan Ahmed Youssef (Egypt)
12 September 2021
20:00

Lithuania	1–2	Venezuela
Zagurskas 7'	Report	Sanz 3'; Vidal 38'

Žalgiris Arena, Kaunas
Attendance: 1,534
Referee: Chris Sinclair (New Zealand)

15 September 2021
18:00

Costa Rica	0–1	Venezuela
	Report	Morillo 18'

Žalgiris Arena, Kaunas
Attendance: 846
Referee: An Ran (China)
15 September 2021
20:00

Lithuania	0–3	Kazakhstan
	Report	Taynan 1'; Tursagulov 30'; Akbalikov 36'

Žalgiris Arena, Kaunas
Attendance: 2,032
Referee: Gábor Kovács (Hungary)

18 September 2021
20:00

Costa Rica	6–2	Lithuania
Tijerino 19', 29'; Cordero 19'; Derendiajev 32' (o.g.); Gómez 34', 40'	Report	Samsonik 8'; Zagurskas 38'

Žalgiris Arena, Kaunas
Attendance: 3,532
Referee: Ebrahim Mehrabi (Iran)
18 September 2021
20:00

Venezuela	1–1	Kazakhstan
Vidal 40'	Report	Douglas Jr. 5'

Avia Solutions Group Arena, Vilnius
Attendance: 717
Referee: Aymen Kammoun (Tunisia)

=== Group B ===
Pos	Team	Pld	W	D	L	GF	GA	GD	Pts	Qualification
1	RFU	3	3	0	0	17	3	+14	9	Advance to the knockout stage
2	Uzbekistan	3	1	0	2	8	10	−2	3	Advance to the knockout stage
3	Guatemala	3	1	0	2	9	14	−5	3	
4	Egypt	3	1	0	2	7	14	−7	3	

Source: FIFA
Rules for classification: Tiebreakers
12 September 2021
16:00

RFU	9–0	Egypt
Kudziev 6'; Chishkala 13', 16', 30'; Antoshkin 28'; El-Ashwal 28' (o.g.); Abramov 31' (pen.), 32'; Milovanov 36'	Report

Avia Solutions Group Arena, Vilnius
Attendance: 500
Referee: Gean Telles (Brazil)
12 September 2021
18:00

Uzbekistan	4–5	Guatemala
Ropiev 6', 25', 35'; Enríquez 39' (o.g.)	Report	Campaignac 4'; Sandoval 5', 22'; Aguilar 7', 40'

Avia Solutions Group Arena, Vilnius
Attendance: 500
Referee: Nikola Jelić (Croatia)

15 September 2021
18:00

Egypt	6–3	Guatemala
Mansour 4'; El-Ashwal 32'; Shoola 35'; Eid 36', 37', 40'	Report	Mansilla 16'; P. Ruiz 25'; W. Ruiz 33'

Avia Solutions Group Arena, Vilnius
Attendance: 328
Referee: Gelareh Nazemi Deylami (Iran)
15 September 2021
20:00

Uzbekistan	2–4	RFU
Choriev 21'; Adilov 28'	Report	Robinho 10'; Niyazov 11', 35', 35'

Avia Solutions Group Arena, Vilnius
Attendance: 469
Referee: Cristian Espindola (Chile)

18 September 2021
18:00

Egypt	1–2	Uzbekistan
Eid 19'	Report	Nishonov 2'; A. Rakhmatov 34'

Avia Solutions Group Arena, Vilnius
Attendance: 661
Referee: Dario Santamaria (Argentina)
18 September 2021
18:00

Guatemala	1–4	RFU
Alvarado 25' (pen.)	Report	Afanasyev 2'; Asadov 10'; Abramov 14'; Antoshkin 27'

Žalgiris Arena, Kaunas
Attendance: 2,122
Referee: Henry Gutiérrez (Bolivia)

=== Group C ===
Pos	Team	Pld	W	D	L	GF	GA	GD	Pts	Qualification
1	Portugal	3	2	1	0	14	4	+10	7	Advance to the knockout stage
2	Morocco	3	1	2	0	10	4	+6	5	Advance to the knockout stage
3	Thailand	3	1	1	1	11	9	+2	4	Advance to the knockout stage
4	Solomon Islands	3	0	0	3	4	22	−18	0	

Source: FIFA
Rules for classification: Tiebreakers
13 September 2021
18:00

Morocco	6–0	Solomon Islands
El Mesrar 2'; Saoud 3'; El Fenni 18'; Bakkali 28'; Boumezou 31'; Borite 34'	Report

Žalgiris Arena, Kaunas
Attendance: 314
Referee: Daniel Rodríguez (Uruguay)
13 September 2021
20:00

Thailand	1–4	Portugal
Jirawat 16'	Report	Bruno Coelho 20'; Erick 27'; Zicky 30'; Pany 32'

Žalgiris Arena, Kaunas
Attendance: 362
Referee: Ronny Zumbado (Costa Rica)

16 September 2021
18:00

Solomon Islands	0–7	Portugal
	Report	Fábio Cecílio 4'; Ricardinho 12'; André Coelho 20', 23'; Sia 26' (o.g.); Erick 30'; Pany 38'

Žalgiris Arena, Kaunas
Attendance: 345
Referee: Carlos Martínez (Paraguay)
16 September 2021
20:00

Thailand	1–1	Morocco
Jirawat 40'	Report	Jouad 18'

Žalgiris Arena, Kaunas
Attendance: 331
Referee: Irina Velikanova (Russia)

19 September 2021
18:00

Solomon Islands	4–9	Thailand
Mana 15'; Ragomo 27' (pen.), 38'; Sia 40'	Report	Nawin 4'; Suphawut 6', 32', 39'; Kritsada 17'; Jetsada 24', 34'; Jirawat 37'; Peerapat 39'

Žalgiris Arena, Kaunas
Attendance: 302
Referee: Cédric Pelissier (France)
19 September 2021
18:00

Portugal	3–3	Morocco
Fábio Cecílio 9'; Tiago Brito 17'; Bruno Coelho 29'	Report	Jouad 2'; El Ayyane 24'; Bakkali 37'

Švyturys Arena, Klaipėda
Attendance: 1,860
Referee: Anthony Riley (New Zealand)

=== Group D ===
Pos	Team	Pld	W	D	L	GF	GA	GD	Pts	Qualification
1	Brazil	3	3	0	0	18	2	+16	9	Advance to the knockout stage
2	Czech Republic	3	1	1	1	6	6	0	4	Advance to the knockout stage
3	Vietnam	3	1	1	1	5	12	−7	4	Advance to the knockout stage
4	Panama	3	0	0	3	4	13	−9	0	

Source: FIFA
Rules for classification: Tiebreakers
13 September 2021
18:00

Panama	1–5	Czech Republic
Goodridge 39'	Report	Záruba 2'; Seidler 5', 9', 10'; Rešetár 30'

Švyturys Arena, Klaipėda
Attendance: 554
Referee: Fahad Alhosani (United Arab Emirates)
13 September 2021
20:00

Vietnam	1–9	Brazil
Khổng Đình Hùng 14'	Report	Rodrigo 3'; Ferrão 5', 7', 21', 24'; Dieguinho 14', 28'; Pito 19'; Leozinho 36'

Švyturys Arena, Klaipėda
Attendance: 667
Referee: Juan Cordero (Spain)

16 September 2021
18:00

Panama	2–3	Vietnam
Castrellón 10', 20'	Report	Nguyễn Minh Trí 2'; Châu Đoàn Phát 8'; Nguyễn Văn Hiếu 27'

Švyturys Arena, Klaipėda
Attendance: 767
Referee: Eduardo Fernandes (Portugal)
16 September 2021
20:00

Brazil	4–0	Czech Republic
Ferrão 23', 24'; Rodrigo 26'; Marlon 40'	Report

Švyturys Arena, Klaipėda
Attendance: 904
Referee: Carlos González (Guatemala)

19 September 2021
16:00

Brazil	5–1	Panama
Vinícius 15'; Gadeia 18'; Leozinho 29'; Pito 40'; Arthur 40'	Report	Maquensi 32'

Švyturys Arena, Klaipėda
Attendance: 1,643
Referee: Daniel Matković (Switzerland)
19 September 2021
16:00

Czech Republic	1–1	Vietnam
Rešetár 36'	Report	Châu Đoàn Phát 35'

Žalgiris Arena, Kaunas
Attendance: 280
Referee: María Estefanía Pinto (Argentina)

=== Group E ===
Pos	Team	Pld	W	D	L	GF	GA	GD	Pts	Qualification
1	Spain	3	3	0	0	12	3	+9	9	Advance to the knockout stage
2	Paraguay	3	2	0	1	6	6	0	6	Advance to the knockout stage
3	Japan	3	1	0	2	11	10	+1	3	Advance to the knockout stage
4	Angola	3	0	0	3	6	16	−10	0	

Source: FIFA
Rules for classification: Tiebreakers
14 September 2021
18:00

Paraguay	0–4	Spain
	Report	Solano 9'; Adri 20'; Gómez 29'; Campos 40'

Švyturys Arena, Klaipėda
Attendance: 550
Referee: Khalid Hnich (Morocco)
14 September 2021
20:00

Angola	4–8	Japan
Guga 19', 21'; R. Hoshi 24' (o.g.); Kaluanda 29'	Report	Oliveira 13', 20', 23', 37'; Murota 14'; R. Hoshi 25'; Nishitani 25'; S. Hoshi 40'

Švyturys Arena, Klaipėda
Attendance: 607
Referee: Diego López (Costa Rica)

17 September 2021
18:00

Spain	4–2	Japan
Borja 4'; Chino 26'; Campos 30'; Tolrà 39'	Report	S. Hoshi 5'; Henmi 8'

Švyturys Arena, Klaipėda
Attendance: 712
Referee: Valeria Palma (Chile)
17 September 2021
20:00

Angola	1–4	Paraguay
Manosele 10'	Report	J. Salas 3'; Rejala 13'; Baez 14'; F. Martínez 17'

Švyturys Arena, Klaipėda
Attendance: 798
Referee: Ryan Shepheard (Australia)

20 September 2021
18:00

Spain	4–1	Angola
Adolfo 4', 25', 27'; Ortiz 20'	Report	Guga 19'

Švyturys Arena, Klaipėda
Attendance: 606
Referee: Josh Wilkens (United States)
20 September 2021
18:00

Japan	1–2	Paraguay
Shimizu 3'	Report	Mareco 7'; J. Salas 33'

Avia Solutions Group Arena, Vilnius
Attendance: 792
Referee: Roberto López (Panama)

=== Group F ===
Pos	Team	Pld	W	D	L	GF	GA	GD	Pts	Qualification
1	Argentina	3	3	0	0	17	3	+14	9	Advance to the knockout stage
2	Iran	3	2	0	1	8	6	+2	6	Advance to the knockout stage
3	Serbia	3	1	0	2	11	7	+4	3	Advance to the knockout stage
4	United States	3	0	0	3	2	22	−20	0	

Source: FIFA
Rules for classification: Tiebreakers
14 September 2021
18:00

Serbia	2–3	Iran
Stojković 18'; Tomić 38'	Report	Ahmadi 4'; Fakhimzadeh 4'; Esmaeilpour 37'

Avia Solutions Group Arena, Vilnius
Attendance: 766
Referee: Carlos González (Guatemala)
14 September 2021
20:00

Argentina	11–0	United States
Brandi 1', 2', 12', 40'; Cuzzolino 4'; Rescia 5'; Basile 7', 16'; Claudino 17', 25'; Borruto 24'	Report

Avia Solutions Group Arena, Vilnius
Attendance: 834
Referee: Ondřej Černý (Czech Republic)

17 September 2021
18:00

Iran	4–2	United States
Tavakoli 3'; Javid 7'; Esmaeilpour 10'; Ahmadabbasi 39'	Report	González 3', 36'

Avia Solutions Group Arena, Vilnius
Attendance: 1,106
Referee: Tarek Elkhataby (Egypt)
17 September 2021
20:00

Argentina	4–2	Serbia
Aksentijević 9' (o.g.); Brandi 11'; Vaporaki 11'; Borruto 24'	Report	Rakić 7'; Lazarević 10'

Avia Solutions Group Arena, Vilnius
Attendance: 1,434
Referee: Nurdin Bukuev (Kyrgyzstan)

20 September 2021
20:00

Iran	1–2	Argentina
Hassanzadeh 30'	Report	Cuzzolino 24'; Stazzone 27'

Avia Solutions Group Arena, Vilnius
Attendance: 1,180
Referee: Alejandro Martínez Flores (Spain)
20 September 2021
20:00

United States	0–7	Serbia
	Report	Rakić 6'; Tomić 8', 17'; Petrov 20'; Milosavljević 32'; Lazarević 33'; Radovanović 38'

Švyturys Arena, Klaipėda
Attendance: 680
Referee: Chris Sinclair (New Zealand)

=== Ranking of third-placed teams ===
Pos	Grp	Team	Pld	W	D	L	GF	GA	GD	Pts	Qualification
1	C	Thailand	3	1	1	1	11	9	+2	4	Advance to the knockout stage
2	D	Vietnam	3	1	1	1	5	12	−7	4	Advance to the knockout stage
3	F	Serbia	3	1	0	2	11	7	+4	3	Advance to the knockout stage
4	E	Japan	3	1	0	2	11	10	+1	3	Advance to the knockout stage
5	A	Costa Rica	3	1	0	2	7	9	−2	3	
6	B	Guatemala	3	1	0	2	9	14	−5	3	

Source: FIFA
Rules for classification: 1) Points; 2) Goal difference; 3) Goals scored; 4) Fair play points; 5) Drawing of lots.

== Knockout stage ==
In the knockout stage, if a match is level at the end of normal playing time, extra time shall be played (two periods of five minutes each) and followed, if necessary, by kicks from the penalty mark to determine the winner. However, for the third place match, if it is played directly before the final, no extra time shall be played and the winner shall be determined by kicks from the penalty mark.

=== Bracket ===
Round of 16
22 September – Kaunas
Venezuela	2
Morocco	3
23 September – Kaunas
Brazil	4
Japan	2
22 September – Vilnius
RFU	3
Vietnam	2
23 September – Vilnius
Argentina	6
Paraguay	1
24 September – Vilnius
Spain	5
Czech Republic	2
24 September – Kaunas
Portugal (a.e.t.)	4
Serbia	3
24 September – Vilnius
Uzbekistan	8
Iran	9
23 September – Kaunas
Kazakhstan	7
Thailand	0

Quarter-finals
26 September – Vilnius
Morocco	0
Brazil	1
26 September – Kaunas
RFU	1 (4)
Argentina (p)	1 (5)
27 September – Vilnius
Spain	2
Portugal (a.e.t.)	4
27 September – Kaunas
Iran	2
Kazakhstan	3

Semi-finals
29 September – Kaunas
Brazil	1
Argentina	2
30 September – Kaunas
Portugal (p)	2 (4)
Kazakhstan	2 (3)

Final
3 October – Kaunas
Argentina	1
Portugal	2
Third place match
3 October – Kaunas
Brazil	4
Kazakhstan	2

Combinations of matches in the Round of 16

The specific match-ups involving the third-placed teams depend on which four third-placed teams qualified for the round of 16:

Combination according to the four qualified teams

Third-placed teams qualify from groups						1A vs	1B vs	1C vs	1D vs
A	B	C	D			3C	3D	3A	3B
A	B	C		E		3C	3A	3B	3E
A	B	C			F	3C	3A	3B	3F
A	B		D	E		3D	3A	3B	3E
A	B		D		F	3D	3A	3B	3F
A	B			E	F	3E	3A	3B	3F
A		C	D	E		3C	3D	3A	3E
A		C	D		F	3C	3D	3A	3F
A		C		E	F	3C	3A	3F	3E
A			D	E	F	3D	3A	3F	3E
	B	C	D	E		3C	3D	3B	3E
	B	C	D		F	3C	3D	3B	3F
	B	C		E	F	3E	3C	3B	3F
	B		D	E	F	3E	3D	3B	3F
		C	D	E	F	3C	3D	3F	3E

=== Round of 16 ===
22 September 2021
17:30

RFU	3–2	Vietnam
Robinho 11'; Chishkala 18', 30'	Report	Nguyễn Đắc Huy 18'; Phạm Đức Hòa 39'

Avia Solutions Group Arena, Vilnius
Attendance: 622
Referee: Roberto López (Panama)

22 September 2021
20:00

Venezuela	2–3	Morocco
Viamonte 7'; M. Francia 33'	Report	El Mesrar 2', 9', 31'

Žalgiris Arena, Kaunas
Attendance: 408
Referee: Hussain Al-Bahhar (Bahrain)

23 September 2021
17:30

Kazakhstan	7–0	Thailand
Tursagulov 3'; Douglas Jr. 4'; Chaivat 19' (o.g.); Taynan 23'; Nurgozhin 24'; Knaub 32'; Higuita 37'	Report

Žalgiris Arena, Kaunas
Attendance: 464
Referee: Mohamed Hassan Ahmed Youssef (Egypt)

23 September 2021
17:30

Argentina	6–1	Paraguay
Claudino 26'; Borruto 27'; Bolo 28'; Basile 29'; Stazzone 35'; Taborda 36'	Report	Mareco 13'

Avia Solutions Group Arena, Vilnius
Attendance: 564
Referee: Nurdin Bukuev (Kyrgyzstan)

23 September 2021
20:00

Brazil	4–2	Japan
Ferrão 5'; Leozinho 31'; Pito 38'; Kato 40' (o.g.)	Report	S. Hoshi 4'; Nishitani 38'

Žalgiris Arena, Kaunas
Attendance: 918
Referee: Irina Velikanova (Russia)

24 September 2021
17:30

Uzbekistan	8–9	Iran
Nishonov 9', 33'; D. Rakhmatov 17'; Ropiev 18'; A. Rakhmatov 28', 39'; Hamroev 31', 40'	Report	Hassanzadeh 1', 28'; Javid 5', 25'; Ahmadabbasi 16', 22', 37'; Tavakoli 18'; Oladghobad 30'

Avia Solutions Group Arena, Vilnius
Attendance: 907
Referee: Diego López (Costa Rica)

24 September 2021
20:00

Portugal	4–3 (a.e.t.)	Serbia
Ricardinho 14'; André Coelho 15'; Pany 43', 43'	Report	Lazarević 23', 28'; Matos 50' (o.g.)

Žalgiris Arena, Kaunas
Attendance: 782
Referee: Daniel Rodríguez (Uruguay)

24 September 2021
20:00

Spain	5–2	Czech Republic
Campos 4'; Gómez 5'; Raya 13'; Fernández 15'; Ortiz 39'	Report	Rešetár 23'; Holý 32'

Avia Solutions Group Arena, Vilnius
Attendance: 1,460
Referee: Tomohiro Kozaki (Japan)

=== Quarter-finals ===
26 September 2021
16:00

Morocco	0–1	Brazil
	Report	Rodrigo 11'

Avia Solutions Group Arena, Vilnius
Attendance: 1,516
Referee: Juan Cordero (Spain)

26 September 2021
18:30

RFU	1–1 (a.e.t.)	Argentina
Antoshkin 35'	Report	Cuzzolino 25'
Penalties
Abramov (penalty missed); Robinho (penalty scored); Lima (penalty scored); Antoshkin (penalty scored); Chishkala (penalty missed); Asadov (penalty scored); Rômulo (penalty missed)	4–5	(penalty scored) Bolo; (penalty scored) Basile; (penalty scored) Edelstein; (penalty missed) Stazzone; (penalty missed) Cuzzolino; (penalty scored) Claudino; (penalty scored) Taborda

Žalgiris Arena, Kaunas
Attendance: 1,108
Referee: Anthony Riley (New Zealand)

27 September 2021
17:30

Spain	2–4 (a.e.t.)	Portugal
Adolfo 22'; Adri 23'	Report	André Coelho 31'; Zicky 36'; Raya 43' (o.g.); Pany 48'

Avia Solutions Group Arena, Vilnius
Attendance: 1,629
Referee: Mohamed Hassan Ahmed Youssef (Egypt)

27 September 2021
20:00

Iran	2–3	Kazakhstan
Oladghobad 8'; Esmaeilpour 15'	Report	Samimi 25' (o.g.); Knaub 29'; Taynan 39'

Žalgiris Arena, Kaunas
Attendance: 512
Referee: Ryan Shepheard (Australia)

=== Semi-finals ===
29 September 2021
20:00

Brazil	1–2	Argentina
Ferrão 17'	Report	Vaporaki 11'; Borruto 13'

Žalgiris Arena, Kaunas
Attendance: 3,349
Referee: Juan Cordero (Spain)

30 September 2021
20:00

Portugal	2–2 (a.e.t.)	Kazakhstan
Pany 23'; Bruno Coelho 49'	Report	Nurgozhin 40'; Douglas Jr. 42'
Penalties
Bruno Coelho (penalty scored); André Coelho (penalty scored); Pany (penalty missed); Ricardinho (penalty scored); Tiago Brito (penalty scored)	4–3	(penalty missed) Douglas Jr.; (penalty scored) Tursagulov; (penalty scored) Higuita; (penalty scored) Akbalikov; (penalty missed) Knaub

Žalgiris Arena, Kaunas
Attendance: 2,052
Referee: Nikola Jelić (Croatia)

=== Third place match ===
3 October 2021
18:00

Brazil	4–2	Kazakhstan
Taynan 25' (o.g.); Rodrigo 32'; Ferrão 34'; Lé 35'	Report	Guitta 12' (o.g.); Taynan 31'

Žalgiris Arena, Kaunas
Attendance: 6,374
Referee: Valeria Palma (Chile)

=== Final ===
3 October 2021
20:00

Argentina	1–2	Portugal
Claudino 28'	Report	Pany 15', 28'

Žalgiris Arena, Kaunas
Attendance: 8,498
Referee: Nurdin Bukuev (Kyrgyzstan)

== Champions ==
FIFA Futsal World Cup
2021 winners

Portugal
First title

== Awards ==
The following awards were given for the tournament:

Golden Shoe winner	Golden Ball winner	Golden Glove winner
(Brazil) Ferrão	(Portugal) Ricardinho	(Argentina) Nicolás Sarmiento
Silver Shoe winner	Silver Ball winner	FIFA Fair Play Trophy
(Portugal) Pany Varela	(Portugal) Pany Varela	Kazakhstan
Bronze Shoe winner	Bronze Ball winner	Goal of the Tournament
(Kazakhstan) Taynan	(Kazakhstan) Douglas Júnior	(Vietnam) Nguyễn Văn Hiếu

== Goalscorers ==
There were 301 goals scored in 52 matches, for an average of 5.79 goals per match.

9 goals

- (Brazil) Ferrão

8 goals

- (Portugal) Pany Varela

6 goals

- (Kazakhstan) Taynan
- (Spain) Adolfo Fernández

5 goals

- (Argentina) Alan Brandi
- (Russia) Ivan Chishkala

4 goals

- (Argentina) Cristian Borruto
- (Argentina) Ángel Claudino
- (Brazil) Rodrigo
- (Egypt) Mostafa Eid
- (Iran) Saeid Ahmadabbasi
- (Japan) Arthur Oliveira
- (Kazakhstan) Douglas Júnior
- (Morocco) Soufiane El Mesrar
- (Portugal) André Coelho
- (Serbia) Jovan Lazarević
- (Uzbekistan) Ikhtiyor Ropiev

3 goals

- (Angola) Guga
- (Argentina) Santiago Basile
- (Argentina) Leandro Cuzzolino
- (Brazil) Leozinho
- (Brazil) Pito
- (Czech Republic) Lukáš Rešetár
- (Czech Republic) Michal Seidler
- (Iran) Ahmad Esmaeilpour
- (Iran) Ali Asghar Hassanzadeh
- (Iran) Mahdi Javid
- (Japan) Shota Hoshi
- (Kazakhstan) Dauren Tursagulov
- (Portugal) Bruno Coelho
- (Russia) Sergei Abramov
- (Russia) Artem Antoshkin
- (Russia) Artem Niyazov
- (Serbia) Dragan Tomić
- (Spain) Raúl Campos
- (Thailand) Jirawat Sornwichian
- (Thailand) Suphawut Thueanklang
- (Uzbekistan) Khusniddin Nishonov
- (Uzbekistan) Anaskhon Rakhmatov

2 goals

- (Argentina) Damián Stazzone
- (Argentina) Constantino Vaporaki
- (Brazil) Dieguinho
- (Costa Rica) Daniel Gómez
- (Costa Rica) Milinton Tijerino
- (Guatemala) Alan Aguilar
- (Guatemala) Marvin Sandoval
- (Iran) Moslem Oladghobad
- (Iran) Farhad Tavakoli
- (Japan) Ryosuke Nishitani
- (Kazakhstan) Arnold Knaub
- (Kazakhstan) Dauren Nurgozhin
- (Lithuania) Justinas Zagurskas
- (Morocco) Bilal Bakkali
- (Morocco) Youssef Jouad
- (Panama) Abdiel Castrellón
- (Paraguay) Julio Mareco
- (Paraguay) Juan Salas
- (Portugal) Erick Mendonça
- (Portugal) Fábio Cecílio
- (Portugal) Ricardinho
- (Portugal) Zicky Té
- (Russia) Robinho
- (Serbia) Stefan Rakić
- (Solomon Islands) Elliot Ragomo
- (Spain) Raúl Gómez
- (Spain) Carlos Ortiz
- (Thailand) Jetsada Chudech
- (United States) Luciano González
- (Uzbekistan) Ilhomjon Hamroev
- (Venezuela) Alfredo Vidal
- (Vietnam) Châu Đoàn Phát

1 goal

- (Angola) Kaluanda
- (Angola) Manosele
- (Argentina) Lucas Bolo
- (Argentina) Maximiliano Rescia
- (Argentina) Pablo Taborda
- (Brazil) Arthur
- (Brazil) Gadeia
- (Brazil) Jefferson Lé
- (Brazil) Marlon
- (Brazil) Vinícius Rocha
- (Costa Rica) Juan Cordero
- (Costa Rica) Pablo Rodríguez
- (Czech Republic) Michal Holý
- (Czech Republic) Radim Záruba
- (Egypt) Abdelrahman El-Ashwal
- (Egypt) Mohamed Mansour
- (Egypt) Tarek Shoola
- (Guatemala) Roman Alvarado
- (Guatemala) Fernando Campaignac
- (Guatemala) José Mansilla
- (Guatemala) Patrick Ruiz
- (Guatemala) Wanderley Ruiz
- (Iran) Hamid Ahmadi
- (Iran) Farhad Fakhimzadeh
- (Japan) Katsutoshi Henmi
- (Japan) Ryuta Hoshi
- (Japan) Yuki Murota
- (Japan) Kazuya Shimizu
- (Kazakhstan) Albert Akbalikov
- (Kazakhstan) Leo Higuita
- (Kazakhstan) Birzhan Orazov
- (Kazakhstan) Chingiz Yessenamanov
- (Lithuania) Genaras Samsonik
- (Morocco) Soufiane Borite
- (Morocco) Otmane Boumezou
- (Morocco) Anas El Ayyane
- (Morocco) Idriss El Fenni
- (Morocco) Achraf Saoud
- (Panama) Claudio Goodridge
- (Panama) Alfonso Maquensi
- (Paraguay) Arnaldo Baez
- (Paraguay) Francisco Martínez
- (Paraguay) Richard Rejala
- (Portugal) Tiago Brito
- (Russia) Andrei Afanasyev
- (Russia) Yanar Asadov
- (Russia) Ruslan Kudziev
- (Russia) Ivan Milovanov
- (Serbia) Lazar Milosavljević
- (Serbia) Strahinja Petrov
- (Serbia) Marko Radovanović
- (Serbia) Miloš Stojković
- (Solomon Islands) Elis Mana
- (Solomon Islands) Marlon Sia
- (Spain) Chino
- (Spain) Borja Díaz
- (Spain) Adri Martínez
- (Spain) José Raya
- (Spain) Francisco Solano
- (Spain) Marc Tolrà
- (Thailand) Peerapat Kaewwilai
- (Thailand) Nawin Rattanawongsawat
- (Thailand) Kritsada Wongkaeo
- (Uzbekistan) Mashrab Adilov
- (Uzbekistan) Davron Choriev
- (Uzbekistan) Dilshod Rakhmatov
- (Venezuela) Milton Francia
- (Venezuela) Rafael Morillo
- (Venezuela) Carlos Sanz
- (Venezuela) Jesús Viamonte
- (Vietnam) Khổng Đình Hùng
- (Vietnam) Nguyễn Đắc Huy
- (Vietnam) Nguyễn Minh Trí
- (Vietnam) Nguyễn Văn Hiếu
- (Vietnam) Phạm Đức Hòa

1 own goal

- (Brazil) Guitta (against Kazakhstan)
- (Egypt) Abdelrahman El-Ashwal (against RFU)
- (Guatemala) Walter Enriquez (against Uzbekistan)
- (Iran) Alireza Samimi (against Kazakhstan)
- (Japan) Ryuta Hoshi (against Angola)
- (Japan) Minami Kato (against Brazil)
- (Kazakhstan) Taynan (against Brazil)
- (Lithuania) Vladimir Derendiajev (against Costa Rica)
- (Portugal) João Matos (against Serbia)
- (Serbia) Miodrag Aksentijević (against Argentina)
- (Solomon Islands) Marlon Sia (against Portugal)
- (Spain) José Raya (against Portugal)
- (Thailand) Chaivat Jamgrajang (against Kazakhstan)

== Tournament ranking ==
Per statistical convention in football, matches decided in extra time are counted as wins and losses, while matches decided by penalty shoot-out are counted as draws.

Pos	Team	Pld	W	D	L	GF	GA	GD	Pts	Final result
1	Portugal	7	5	2	0	26	12	+14	17	Champions
2	Argentina	7	5	1	1	27	8	+19	16	Runners-up
3	Brazil	7	6	0	1	28	8	+20	18	Third place
4	Kazakhstan	7	4	2	1	24	10	+14	14	Fourth place
5	RFU	5	4	1	0	21	6	+15	13	Eliminated in Quarter-finals
6	Spain	5	4	0	1	19	9	+10	12	Eliminated in Quarter-finals
7	Iran	5	3	0	2	19	17	+2	9	Eliminated in Quarter-finals
8	Morocco	5	2	2	1	13	7	+6	8	Eliminated in Quarter-finals
9	Venezuela	4	2	1	1	6	5	+1	7	Eliminated in Round of 16
10	Paraguay	4	2	0	2	7	12	–5	6	Eliminated in Round of 16
11	Czech Republic	4	1	1	2	8	11	–3	4	Eliminated in Round of 16
12	Thailand	4	1	1	2	11	16	–5	4	Eliminated in Round of 16
13	Vietnam	4	1	1	2	7	15	–8	4	Eliminated in Round of 16
14	Serbia	4	1	0	3	14	11	+3	3	Eliminated in Round of 16
15	Japan	4	1	0	3	13	14	–1	3	Eliminated in Round of 16
16	Uzbekistan	4	1	0	3	16	19	–3	3	Eliminated in Round of 16
17	Costa Rica	3	1	0	2	7	9	–2	3	Eliminated in Group stage
18	Guatemala	3	1	0	2	9	14	–5	3	Eliminated in Group stage
19	Egypt	3	1	0	2	7	14	–7	3	Eliminated in Group stage
20	Lithuania	3	0	0	3	3	11	–8	0	Eliminated in Group stage
21	Panama	3	0	0	3	4	13	–9	0	Eliminated in Group stage
22	Angola	3	0	0	3	6	16	–10	0	Eliminated in Group stage
23	Solomon Islands	3	0	0	3	4	22	–18	0	Eliminated in Group stage
24	United States	3	0	0	3	2	22	–20	0	Eliminated in Group stage
