= 1996 FIFA Futsal World Championship =

Campeonato Mundial de Fútbol Sala de la FIFA 1996

Tournament details
- Host country: Spain
- Dates: 24 November – 8 December
- Teams: 16 (from 6 confederations)
- Venues: 4 (in 4 host cities)

Final positions
- Champions: Brazil (3rd title)
- Runners-up: Spain
- Third place: Russia
- Fourth place: Ukraine

Tournament statistics
- Matches played: 40
- Goals scored: 290 (7.25 per match)
- Attendance: 116,400 (2,910 per match)
- Top scorer: (Brazil) Manoel Tobias (14 goals)
- Best player: (Brazil) Manoel Tobias

The 1996 FIFA Futsal World Championship was the third FIFA Futsal World Championship, the quadrennial international futsal championship contested by the men's national teams of the member associations of FIFA. It was held between 24 November and 8 December 1996, in Spain.

Brazil won the tournament for the third consecutive time.

== Qualifying criteria ==
=== Qualified nations ===
Competition	Date	Venue	Berths	Qualified
Host Nation			1	Spain
AFC Preliminary Competition	27 March – 17 August 1996	China; Iran; Malaysia	3	China; Iran; Malaysia
1996 African Futsal Championship	16–21 April 1996	Egypt	1	Egypt
1996 CONCACAF Futsal Championship	20–29 July 1996	Guatemala	2	United States; Cuba
1996 South American Futsal Championship	16–20 April 1996	Brazil	3	Brazil; Uruguay; Argentina
1996 Oceanian Futsal Championship	3–8 August 1996	Vanuatu	1	Australia
UEFA Preliminary Competition			5	Belgium; Italy; Netherlands; Russia; Ukraine
TOTAL			16	Field is Finalized

== Venues ==
Murcia	Segovia	Castellón de la Plana	Barcelona
Palacio de Deportes de Murcia	Pabellon Pedro Delgado Robledo	Pabellon de Castellon	Palau Sant Jordi
Capacity: 7,500	Capacity: 2,050	Capacity: 4,357	Capacity: 15,000
1996 FIFA Futsal World Championship is located in Spain

== Draw ==
The 16 teams were divided in four groups, each group with four teams.

== First round ==
=== Group A ===
Team	Pld	W	D	L	GF	GA	GD	Pts
Spain	3	3	0	0	18	3	+15	9
Ukraine	3	2	0	1	22	9	+13	6
Egypt	3	1	0	2	13	19	−6	3
Australia	3	0	0	3	4	26	−22	0

24 November 1996

Spain	7–2	Egypt

24 November 1996

Ukraine	11–2	Australia

26 November 1996

Egypt	8–2	Australia

26 November 1996

Spain	4–1	Ukraine

28 November 1996

Ukraine	10–3	Egypt

28 November 1996

Spain	7–0	Australia

=== Group B ===
Team	Pld	W	D	L	GF	GA	GD	Pts
Netherlands	3	2	1	0	13	6	+7	7
Russia	3	1	2	0	15	5	+10	5
Argentina	3	1	1	1	7	9	−2	4
China	3	0	0	3	3	18	−15	0

25 November 1996

Argentina	2–1	China

25 November 1996

Netherlands	2–2	Russia

27 November 1996

Argentina	2–2	Russia

27 November 1996

Netherlands	5–1	China

28 November 1996

Russia	11–1	China

28 November 1996

Netherlands	6–3	Argentina

=== Group C ===
Team	Pld	W	D	L	GF	GA	GD	Pts
Italy	3	2	1	0	16	5	+11	7
Uruguay	3	2	1	0	7	3	+4	7
United States	3	1	0	2	12	7	+5	3
Malaysia	3	0	0	3	4	24	−20	0

24 November 1996

United States	0–1	Uruguay

24 November 1996

Malaysia	1–10	Italy

26 November 1996

Italy	4–2	United States

26 November 1996

Uruguay	4–1	Malaysia

28 November 1996

Uruguay	2–2	Italy

28 November 1996

United States	10–2	Malaysia

=== Group D ===
Team	Pld	W	D	L	GF	GA	GD	Pts
Brazil	3	3	0	0	31	5	+26	9
Belgium	3	2	0	1	13	10	+3	6
Iran	3	1	0	2	12	14	−2	3
Cuba	3	0	0	3	4	31	−27	0

25 November 1996

Brazil	5–2	Belgium

25 November 1996

Iran	7–1	Cuba

27 November 1996

Belgium	5–2	Iran

27 November 1996

Brazil	18–0	Cuba

28 November 1996

Brazil	8–3	Iran

28 November 1996

Belgium	6–3	Cuba

== Second round ==
=== Group E ===
Team	Pld	W	D	L	GF	GA	GD	Pts
Spain	3	3	0	0	8	2	+6	9
Russia	3	2	0	1	9	4	+5	6
Italy	3	1	0	2	5	8	−3	3
Belgium	3	0	0	3	4	12	−8	0

1 December 1996

Italy	4–1	Belgium

1 December 1996

Spain	2–0	Russia

2 December 1996

Italy	0–3	Russia

2 December 1996

Belgium	1–2	Spain

4 December 1996

Russia	6–2	Belgium

4 December 1996

Spain	4–1	Italy

=== Group F ===
Team	Pld	W	D	L	GF	GA	GD	Pts
Brazil	3	2	1	0	12	5	+7	7
Ukraine	3	1	2	0	11	9	+2	5
Uruguay	3	1	0	2	10	14	−4	3
Netherlands	3	0	1	2	9	14	−5	1

30 November 1996

Netherlands	4–4	Ukraine

30 November 1996

Brazil	5–2	Uruguay

1 December 1996

Ukraine	2–2	Brazil

1 December 1996

Uruguay	5–4	Netherlands

3 December 1996

Brazil	5–1	Netherlands

3 December 1996

Ukraine	5–3	Uruguay

== Third round ==
Semi-finals
6 December 1996
Brazil	6
Russia	2
6 December 1996
Spain	4
Ukraine	1

Final
8 December 1996
Brazil	6
Spain	4
Third place
8 December 1996
Russia	3
Ukraine	2

=== Semi-finals ===
6 December 1996

Brazil	6–2	Russia

6 December 1996

Spain	4–1	Ukraine

=== Third place match ===
8 December 1996

Russia	3–2	Ukraine

=== Final ===
8 December 1996
13:00

Brazil	6–4 (HT: 3–1)	Spain
Danilo 8′01″, 23′06″ Choco 16′02″ Marcio 18′04″ Vander 37′08″ Manoel Tobias 39′10″	Report	Pato 16′03″ Serginho 21′05″ (o.g.); Vicentin 26′07″, 39′09″

Palau Sant Jordi, Barcelona
Attendance: 15,500
Referee: Perry Gautier (Belgium)

== Champions ==
FIFA Futsal World Championships 1996 winners

Brazil
Third title

12–man Roster
Serginho, Marcio, Waginho, Manoel Tobias, Fininho, Sandrinho, Danilo, Choco, Vander, Bage, Clovis, Djacir
Head coach
Estaquio Afonso Araujo

== Tournament ranking ==
Per statistical convention in football, matches decided in extra time are counted as wins and losses, while matches decided by penalty shoot-out are counted as draws.

Pos	Team	Pld	W	D	L	GF	GA	GD	Pts	Final result
1	Brazil	8	7	1	0	55	16	+39	22	Champions
2	Spain	8	7	0	1	34	12	+22	21	Runners-up
3	Russia	8	4	2	2	29	17	+12	14	Third place
4	Ukraine	8	3	2	3	36	25	+11	11	Fourth place
5	Italy	6	3	1	2	21	13	+8	10	Eliminated in Second round
6	Uruguay	6	3	1	2	17	17	0	10	Eliminated in Second round
7	Netherlands	6	2	2	2	22	20	+2	8	Eliminated in Second round
8	Belgium	6	2	0	4	17	22	–5	6	Eliminated in Second round
9	Argentina	3	1	1	1	7	9	–2	4	Eliminated in First round
10	United States	3	1	0	2	12	7	+5	3	Eliminated in First round
11	Iran	3	1	0	2	12	14	–2	3	Eliminated in First round
12	Egypt	3	1	0	2	13	19	–6	3	Eliminated in First round
13	China	3	0	0	3	3	18	–15	0	Eliminated in First round
14	Malaysia	3	0	0	3	4	24	–20	0	Eliminated in First round
15	Australia	3	0	0	3	4	26	–22	0	Eliminated in First round
16	Cuba	3	0	0	3	4	31	–27	0	Eliminated in First round
