= Catalonia men's national futsal team =

Catalonia
- Nickname(s): La selecció
- Association: Federació Catalana de Futbol Sala
- Confederation: UEFS (Europe)
- Head coach: A confirmar
Home colours	Away colours

AMF World Cup
- Appearances: 2 (First in 2007)
- Best result: 7th place, (2011)

Europe UEFS Championship
- Appearances: 6 (First in 2004)
- Best result: Runners-up (2006)

The Catalonia national futsal team represents Catalonia in international futsal competitions organized by AMF and UEFS. It is controlled by the Catalonia Futsal Federation.

In 2006 they were the runners-up in the UEFS Championship.

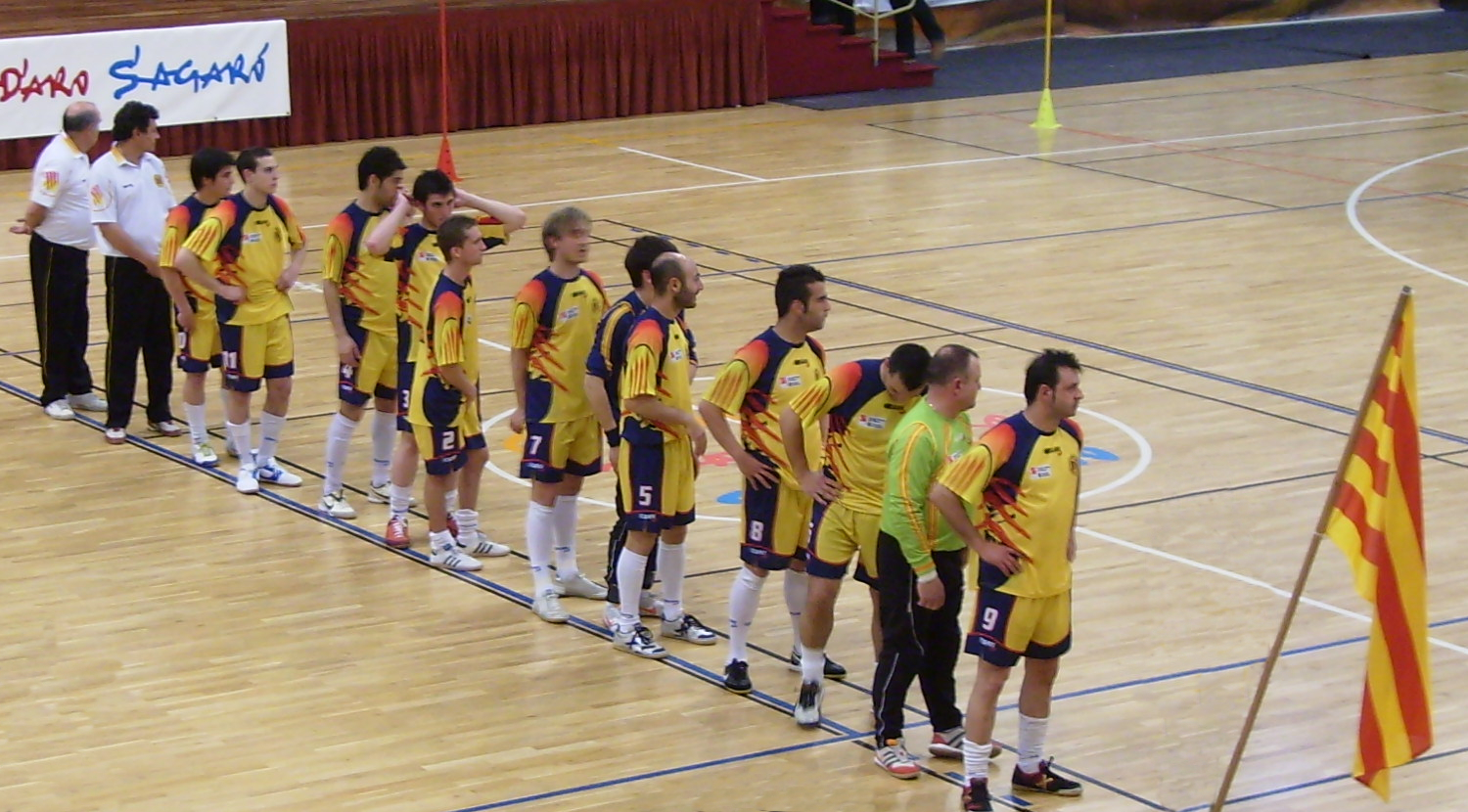
Catalonia national futsal team

== Tournament records ==
AMF World Cup record

Year	Position	GP	W	D	L	GS	GA
(Brazil) 1982	Did not enter						
(Spain) 1985	Did not enter						
(Australia) 1988	Did not enter						
(Italy) 1991	Did not enter						
(Argentina) 1994	Did not enter						
(Mexico) 1997	Did not enter						
(Bolivia) 2000	Did not enter						
(Paraguay) 2003	Did not enter						
(Argentina) 2007	Group Stage	3	0	1	2	10	18
(Colombia) 2011	Quarter-Finals	4	2	0	2	13	17
(Belarus) 2015	Withdrawn						
(Argentina) 2019	To be determined						
Total		7	2	1	4	23	35

UEFS European Championship record

Year	Position	GP	W	D	L	GS	GA
(Spain) 1989	Did not enter						
(Portugal) 1990	Did not enter						
(Portugal) 1992	Did not enter						
(Morocco) 1995	Did not enter						
(Slovakia) 1998	Did not enter						
(Belarus) 2004	Group Stage	4	1	1	2	16	17
(Catalonia) 2006	Runners-up	5	2	2	1	13	10
(Belgium) 2008	Group Stage	5	0	1	4	13	19
(Russia) 2010	Group Stage	4	1	0	3	9	12
(Belarus) 2012	Fourth Place	5	2	1	1	9	10
(Czech Republic) 2014	Third Place	5	3	0	2	9	10
(Russia) 2016	Did not enter						
(Catalonia) 2018	Group Stage						
Total		28	9	5	14	60	68

== Current squad ==
(2010 UEFS Futsal Championship)

Coach : Juan Antonio Fernández

#	Position	Name	Club
		Daniel Asensio Pérez	CFS La Garriga
		Edu Prat	Espardenya Masquefa
		Pere Cortacans	Conforsa Ripoll
		Ivan Mateos	Futsal LLivia
		Josep Maria Vila	Futsal Llívia
		Marc Paredes	FS Cardedeu
		Eric Requena	CFS La Garriga
		Edu Velilla	CFS La Garriga
		Sergi Castro	CFS La Garriga
		Jordi Torra	Espardenya Masquefa
		Francis García	Espardenya Masquefa
		Rafa García	Espardenya Masquefa
		Angel Durán	Espardenya Masquefa
		Gabri Fargas	Conforsa Ripoll

- In the 2007 AMF Futsal Men's World Cup, the players were Daniel Asensio Pérez, Osvald Casadesús, Juan Carlos Nieto, Israel Martínez, Joan Collboni, Isidoro Vargas, Antonio Manuel Matamoros, Javier Sánchez, Juan José Pavo, David Beltran, Llorenç Tarrés and José Manuel Lago.

== See also ==
- Catalonia women's national futsal team
- Futsal in Catalonia
