= Futsal in Catalonia =

Futsal in Catalonia, Spain is managed by the Catalonia Federation of Futsal (FCFS) (Federació Catalana de Futbol Sala), affiliated to European Union of Futsal in 2004 and recognised by the AMF in 2006.

It's also managed by Catalonia Football Federation (FCF) for the teams that play the FIFA game.

== FCFS hierarchical divisional breakdowns ==
- Divisió d'Honor Nacional Catalana
- Divisió d'Honor Territorial Catalana
- 2a Divisió FCFS
- 3a Divisió FCFS

=== FCFS men champions ===
- 2004–2005 – C.E. Brasil
- 2005–2006 – Sant Pau Segúries
- 2006–2007 – C.E. Brasil
- 2007–2008 –
- 2008–2009 –
- 2009–2010 – CFS LA Garriga

=== FCFS women champions ===
- 2009–2010 – CFS Casa Alcalà

== National teams ==
The Catalonia national futsal teams represent Catalonia in AMF World Cup and UEFS Futsal Championship.

The Catalonia women's national team are the current world champions after winning the 2008 World Cup. They also were the runners-up in the 2004 European Championship.

The Catalonia men's national team has played three times in UEFS European Championships, reaching the second place in 2006, and has played once in AMF Futsal World Cup, in 2007. Also played in the 2007 AMF World Tournament in Yakutia, with the sixth place.
