= 2008 UEFS Futsal Men's Championship =

VIII. European Men's Championship - Eurofutsal 2008

Tournament details
- Host country: Belgium
- Dates: 20 March – 24 March
- Teams: 8 (from 1 confederation)
- Venues: 6 (in 5 host cities)

Final positions
- Champions: Russia (3rd title)
- Runners-up: Czech Republic
- Third place: Belarus
- Fourth place: Belgium

Tournament statistics
- Matches played: 20
- Goals scored: 117 (5.85 per match)

The 2008 UEFS Futsal Men's Championship was the eighth UEFS futsal championship held in Belgium, with 8 national teams. The matches were played in Antwerp, Liège, Limbourg, La Louvière and Namur, from March 20 to March 24, 2008.

European Union of Futsal (UEFS) organizes the European Championship biennially.

== Teams ==
Group A
Czech Republic
Norway
Russia
Ukraine

Group B
Belgium
Belarus
Catalonia
France

== Group stage ==
=== Group A ===
Group A	Pts	P	W	D	L	G+	G-	DG
Russia	7	3	2	1	0	15	4	+11
Czech Republic	7	3	2	1	0	7	3	+4
Ukraine	3	3	1	0	2	7	10	-3
Norway	0	3	0	0	3	3	15	-12

March 20, 2008; 19:45
March 20, 2008; 19:45	Russia	1-1	Czech Republic	Houthalen-Helchteren A Limbourg

March 20, 2008; 21:30
March 20, 2008; 21:30	Norway	2-3	Ukraine	Houthalen-Helchteren B Limbourg

March 21, 2008; 19:00
March 21, 2008; 19:00	Russia	9-1	Norway	Lier; Antwerp

March 21, 2008; 21:00
March 21, 2008; 21:00	Czech Republic	3-2	Ukraine	Haine-St. Paul; La Louvière

March 22, 2008; 19:00
March 22, 2008; 19:00	Russia	5-2	Ukraine	Soumage; Liège

March 22, 2008; 19:00
March 22, 2008; 19:00	Czech Republic	3-0	Norway	Andenne; Namur

=== Group B ===
Group B	Pts	P	W	D	L	G+	G-	DG
Belgium	6	3	2	0	1	8	8	=
Belarus	6	3	2	0	1	12	7	+5
France	4	3	1	1	1	8	9	-1
Catalonia	1	3	0	1	2	6	10	-4

March 20, 2008; 19:45
March 20, 2008; 19:45	France	1-4	Belarus	Houthalen-Helchteren B Limbourg

March 20, 2008; 21:30
March 20, 2008; 21:30	Belgium	2-1	Catalonia	Houthalen-Helchteren A Limbourg

March 21, 2008; 19:00
March 21, 2008; 19:00	Belgium	3-5	France	Haine-St. Paul; La Louvière

March 21, 2008; 21:00
March 21, 2008; 21:00	Catalonia	3-6	Belarus	Liers; Antwerp

March 22, 2008; 21:00
March 22, 2008; 21:00	France	2-2	Catalonia	Soumage; Liège

March 22, 2008; 21:00
March 22, 2008; 21:00	Belgium	3-2	Belarus	Andenne; Namur

== Final stage ==
Semi-finals
March 23 - Hoboken (Antwerp)
Russia	3
Belarus	1
March 23 - Hoboken (Antwerp)
Belgium	1 (0)
Czech Republic	1* (2)

Final
March 24 - (Liège)
Russia	3* (3)
Czech Republic	3 (2)
Third place
March 24 - (Liège)
Belarus	2
Belgium	1

=== Semifinals ===
March 23, 2008; 19:00
March 23, 2008; 19:00	Russia	3-1	Belarus	Hoboken; Antwerp

March 23, 2008; 21:00
March 23, 2008; 21:00	Belgium	1-1 (0-2 pen.)	Czech Republic	Hoboken; Antwerp

=== 5th-8th places ===
March 23, 2008; 15:00
March 23, 2008; 15:00	Ukraine	4-3	Catalonia	Hoboken; Antwerp

March 23, 2008; 17:00
March 23, 2008; 17:00	France	6-5	Norway	Hoboken; Antwerp

=== 7th-8th places ===
March 24, 2008; 15:00
March 24, 2008; 15:00	Norway	5-4	Catalonia	Complexe Sportif Ethias; Liège

=== 5th-6th places ===
March 24, 2008; 17:00
March 24, 2008; 17:00	Ukraine	7-2	France	Complexe Sportif Ethias; Liège

=== 3rd-4th places ===
March 24, 2008; 19:00
March 24, 2008; 19:00	Belarus	2-1	Belgium	Complexe Sportif Ethias; Liège

=== Final ===
March 24, 2008; 21:00
March 24, 2008; 21:00	Russia	3-3 (3-2 pen.)	Czech Republic	Complexe Sportif Ethias; Liège

== Final standings ==
Final standings
	Russia
	Czech Republic
	Belarus
4.	Belgium
5.	Ukraine
6.	France
7.	Norway
8.	Catalonia

== See also ==
- UEFS Futsal Championship
- European Union of Futsal
