= 2012 UEFS Futsal Men's Championship =

2012 UEFS Futsal European Men's Championship
X. European Men's Championship

Tournament details
- Host country: Belarus
- Dates: 14 – 19 May
- Teams: 9 (from 1 confederation)
- Venue: 1 (in 1 host city)

Final positions
- Champions: Belgium (1st title)
- Runners-up: Czech Republic
- Third place: Russia
- Fourth place: Catalonia

Tournament statistics
- Matches played: 21
- Goals scored: 133 (6.33 per match)

The 2012 UEFS Futsal Men's Championship was the tenth men's UEFS futsal championship, held in Brest (Belarus) from May 14 to 19, with 9 national teams. Belgium won their first ever European championship defeating the Czech Republic 4-1 in the final.

European Union of Futsal (UEFS) organizes the European Championship biennially.

== Teams ==
Group A
Catalonia
Russia
South Ossetia

Group B
Belgium
Slovakia
Latvia

Group C
Belarus
Czech Republic
Norway

== First round ==
=== Group A ===
GROUP A	Pts	P	W	L	+	-	dif
Catalonia	6	2	2	0	4	2	+2
Russia	3	2	1	1	6	4	+2
South Ossetia	0	2	0	2	2	6	-4

14 May - 16:30
14 May - 16:30	South Ossetia	2-4	Russia	Brest

15 May - 16:30
15 May - 16:30	Catalonia	2-0	South Ossetia	Brest

16 May - 16:30
16 May - 16:30	Russia	2-2*	Catalonia	Brest

=== Group B ===
GROUP B	Pts	P	W	L	+	-	dif
Belgium	6	2	2	0	14	3	+11
Slovakia	3	2	1	1	7	5	+2
Latvia	0	2	0	2	1	14	-13

14 May - 18:00
14 May - 18:00	Slovakia	2-5	Belgium	Brest

15 May - 18:00
15 May - 18:00	Latvia	0-5	Slovakia	Brest

16 May - 18:00
16 May - 18:00	Belgium	9-1	Latvia	Brest

=== Group C ===
GROUP C	Pts	P	W	L	+	-	dif
Belarus	6	2	2	0	5	2	+3
Czech Republic	3	2	1	1	7	3	+4
Norway	0	2	0	2	3	10	-7

14 May - 19:30
14 May - 19:30	Norway	1-4	Belarus	Brest

15 May - 19:30
15 May - 19:30	Czech Republic	6-2	Norway	Brest

16 May - 19:30
16 May - 19:30	Belarus	1*-1	Czech Republic	Brest

== Final round ==
Quarter-finals
17 May
Catalonia	3
Norway	2
17 May
Czech Republic	5
Slovakia	2
17 May
Belgium	8
South Ossetia	4
17 May
Russia	2
Belarus	1

Semi-finals
18 May
Catalonia	1
Czech Republic	2
18 May
Belgium	5
Russia	2

Final
19 May
Czech Republic	1
Belgium	4
Third place
19 May
Catalonia	1
Russia	4

Quarter finals

17 May - 14:30
17 May - 14:30	Norway	2-3	Catalonia	Brest

17 May - 16:15
17 May - 16:15	Belgium	8-4	South Ossetia	Brest

17 May - 18:00
17 May - 18:00	Czech Republic	5-2	Slovakia	Brest

17 May - 19:15
17 May - 19:15	Belarus	1-2	Russia	Brest

Places 5-8

18 May - 17:00
18 May - 17:00	Norway	7-6	Slovakia	Brest

18 May - 15:15
18 May - 15:15	Belarus	6-4	South Ossetia	Brest

Semifinals

18 May - 17:00
18 May - 17:00	Czech Republic	2-1	Catalonia	Brest

18 May - 19:00
18 May - 19:00	Russia	2-5	Belgium	Brest

Places 7-8

19 May - 7:30
19 May - 7:30	Norway	4-3	South Ossetia	Brest

Places 5-6

19 May - 12:30
19 May - 12:30	Belarus	6-1	Slovakia	Brest

Places 3-4

19 May - 14:00
19 May - 14:00	Russia	4-1	Catalonia	Brest

FINAL

19 May - 16:00
19 May - 16:00	Belgium	4-1	Czech Republic	Brest

Winners
BELGIUM

== Final standings ==
Final standings
Gold medal	Belgium
Silver medal	Czech Republic
Bronze medal	Russia
4.	Catalonia
5.	(Belarus) Beelarus
6.	Slovakia
7.	Norway
8.	South Ossetia
9.	Latvia
