= 2010 UEFS Futsal Men's Championship =

IX. European Men's Championship

Tournament details
- Host country: Russia
- Dates: 3 – 8 May
- Teams: 11 (from 1 confederation)
- Venue(s): 2 (in 2 host cities)

Final positions
- Champions: Russia (4th title)
- Runners-up: Belgium
- Third place: Czech Republic
- Fourth place: Belarus

Tournament statistics
- Matches played: 24
- Goals scored: 207 (8.63 per match)

The 2010 UEFS Futsal Men's Championship was the ninth men's UEFS futsal championship, held in Kaliningrad and Gusev (Russia) from May 3 to 8, with 11 national teams in the competition.

European Union of Futsal (UEFS) organizes the European Championship biennially.

== Teams ==
Group A
Abkhazia
Israel
Russia

Group B
Catalonia
Czech Republic

Group C
Belarus
Kyrgyzstan
South Ossetia

Group D
Belgium
Latvia
Ukraine

== First round ==
=== Group A ===
GROUP A	Pts	P	W	D	L	+	-	dif
Russia	6	2	2	0	0	30	3	+27
Israel	3	2	1	0	1	11	16	-5
Abkhazia	0	2	0	0	2	7	29	-22

3 May - 19:00
3 May - 19:00	Israel	0–12	Russia	Kaliningrad

4 May - 18:30
4 May - 18:30	Russia	18–3	Abkhazia	Kaliningrad

5 May - 18:30
5 May - 18:30	Abkhazia	4–11	Israel	Kaliningrad

=== Group B ===
GROUP B	Pts	P	W	D	L	+	-	dif
Czech Republic	3	1	1	0	0	3	1	+2
Catalonia	0	1	0	0	1	1	3	-2

4 May - 18:30
4 May - 18:30	Czech Republic	3–1	Catalonia	Gusev

=== Group C ===
GROUP C	Pts	P	W	D	L	+	-	dif
Belarus	6	2	2	0	0	12	3	+9
South Ossetia	3	2	1	0	1	11	7	+4
Kyrgyzstan	0	2	0	0	2	2	15	-13

3 May - 11:00
3 May - 11:00	Belarus	7–0	Kyrgyzstan	Gusev

4 May - 17:00
4 May - 17:00	Kyrgyzstan	2–8	South Ossetia	Gusev

5 May - 16:30
5 May - 16:30	South Ossetia	3–5	Belarus	Gusev

=== Group D ===
GROUP D	Pts	P	W	D	L	+	-	dif
Belgium	6	2	2	0	0	16	6	+10
Latvia	3	2	1	0	1	9	7	+2
Ukraine	0	2	0	0	2	5	17	-12

3 May - 17:00
3 May - 17:00	Ukraine	1–7	Latvia	Kaliningrad

4 May - 17:00
4 May - 17:00	Latvia	2–6	Belgium	Kaliningrad

5 May - 17:00
5 May - 17:00	Belgium	10–4	Ukraine	Kaliningrad

== Second round ==
Quarter finals

6 May - 15:00
6 May - 15:00	Russia	7–0	Latvia	Kaliningrad

6 May - 16:30
6 May - 16:30	Belgium	11–1	Israel	Kaliningrad

6 May - 18:00
6 May - 18:00	Czech Republic	3–1	South Ossetia	Kaliningrad

6 May - 19:30
6 May - 19:30	Belarus	4–0	Catalonia	Kaliningrad

9th to 11th places

6 May - 18:00
6 May - 18:00	Abkhazia	0–6	Ukraine	Gusev

Kyrgyzstan	-

== Final round ==
Semi-finals
7 May
Russia	4
Belarus	2
7 May
Belgium (aet)	5
Czech Republic	4

Final
8 May
Russia	5
Belgium	2
Third place
8 May
Belarus	4 (1)
Czech Republic	4* (2)

9-10 places

7 May
7 May	Ukraine	1–3	Kyrgyzstan	Gusev

5-8 places

7 May
7 May	Latvia	6–6	South Ossetia	Kaliningrad
7 May		4-3 pen.		Kaliningrad

7 May
7 May	Israel	1–5	Catalonia	Kaliningrad

Semifinals

7 May
7 May	Russia	4–2	Belarus	Kaliningrad

7 May
7 May	Belgium	5–4	Czech Republic	Kaliningrad
7 May		OT		Kaliningrad

7-8 places

8 May
8 May	South Ossetia	7–1	Israel	Kaliningrad

5-6 places

8 May
8 May	Latvia	4–3	Catalonia	Kaliningrad

3-4 places

8 May
8 May	Belarus	4–4	Czech Republic	Kaliningrad
8 May		1-2 pen.		Kaliningrad

FINAL

8 May
8 May	Russia	5–2	Belgium	Kaliningrad

== Final standings ==
Final standings
	Russia
	Belgium
	Czech Republic
4.	Belarus
5.	Latvia
6.	Catalonia
7.	South Ossetia
8.	Israel
9.	Kyrgyzstan
10.	Ukraine
11.	Abkhazia
