= 2015 AMF Futsal Men's World Cup =

2015 XI AMF Futsal Men's World Cup
Чемпионат мира по футзалу (AMF) 2015
- Logo of the XI AMF Futsal Men's World Cup

Tournament details
- Host country: Belarus
- Dates: 17–25 April
- Teams: 16 (from 5 confederations)
- Venues: 6 (in 5 host cities)

Final positions
- Champions: Colombia (3rd title)
- Runners-up: Paraguay
- Third place: Argentina
- Fourth place: Belgium

Tournament statistics
- Matches played: 32
- Goals scored: 202 (6.31 per match)
- Top scorer(s): (Paraguay) Darío Herrera (Uruguay) Marcio Gentil (10 goals each)

The 2015 AMF Futsal Men's World Cup was the 11th edition of the AMF Futsal World Cup. The tournament was held in Belarus from 17 to 25 April in the cities of Brest, Minsk, Pinsk, Maladzyechna and Barysaw. Sixteen national teams from all confederations participated in the tournament. Colombia won the tournament by defeating Paraguay 4–0 in the final, achieving its second consecutive title and third overall.

== Venues ==
Matches were played in six venues across five cities: Brest, Minsk, Pinsk, Maladzyechna and Barysaw.

Minsk	2015 AMF Futsal Men's World Cup is located in Belarus	Minsk
Minsk-Arena	2015 AMF Futsal Men's World Cup is located in Belarus	Minsk Sports Palace
Capacity: 15,086	2015 AMF Futsal Men's World Cup is located in Belarus	Capacity: 3,311
Brest	2015 AMF Futsal Men's World Cup is located in Belarus	Pinsk
Sports Hall Victoria	2015 AMF Futsal Men's World Cup is located in Belarus	Polessie University
Capacity: 3,740	2015 AMF Futsal Men's World Cup is located in Belarus	Capacity: 640
Maladzyechna	2015 AMF Futsal Men's World Cup is located in Belarus	Barysaw
Ice Palace	2015 AMF Futsal Men's World Cup is located in Belarus	Barysaw Physical Center
Capacity: 2,000	2015 AMF Futsal Men's World Cup is located in Belarus	Capacity: 350

== Participating teams ==
In addition to host nation Belarus, 15 nations qualified.

Tournament	Date	Venue	Qualified teams	
Host	—	—	1	Belarus
2011 AMF Futsal Men's World Cup	15 – 26 March 2011	Colombia	1	Colombia
2014 UEFS Futsal Men's Championship	19 – 24 May 2014	Czech Republic	3	Belgium; ~~Catalonia~~; Russia; Slovakia
Europe qualification tournament	29 September – 3 October 2014	Catalonia	2	Czech Republic; Norway
Central America qualification tournament	11 – 19 October 2014	Suriname	1	Curaçao^{1}
South America qualification tournament	2 – 7 December 2014	Colombia	4	Paraguay; Argentina; Uruguay; Brazil
Invited	18 December 2014	—	3	Australia; Kyrgyzstan^{1} Morocco
Invited	19 January 2015	—	1	Venezuela
Total			16	

1.Teams that made their debut.

== Group stage ==
The group winners and runners up advanced to the quarter-finals.

=== Group A ===
Team	Pld	W	D	L	GF	GA	GD	Pts
Uruguay	3	3	0	0	12	5	+7	9
Belarus	3	2	0	1	6	5	+1	6
Brazil	3	1	0	2	7	5	+2	3
Australia	3	0	0	3	4	14	−10	0

17 April
19:00 UTC+3

Belarus	2–1	Brazil
Tesliuk 31'; Seliuk 33'	Report	Duran 31'

Minsk Arena, Minsk
18 April
17:00 UTC+3

Uruguay	7–2	Australia
Gentil 5', 13', 17', 22'; Gianechini 12', 21'; Triunfo 33'	Report 1 Report 2	Lynch 13'; Hoole 21'

Minsk Sports Palace, Minsk
19 April
17:00 UTC+3

Belarus	2–3	Uruguay
Seliuk 25'; Yakubov 40'	Report	Gentil 7', 37'; Hernández 17'

Minsk Sports Palace, Minsk
19 April
19:00 UTC+3

Brazil	5–1	Australia
Camargo 8'; Rocha 27'; Feitosa 36', 39'; Duran 39'	Report	Hoole 26'

Ice Palace, Maladzyechna
20 April
18:00 UTC+3

Uruguay	2–1	Brazil
Lorier 17'; Gentil 20'	Report	Duran 18'

Minsk Sports Palace, Minsk
20 April
20:00 UTC+3

Belarus	2–1	Australia
Yakubov 27'; Nalivaiko 34'	Report	Lynch 35'

Minsk Sports Palace, Minsk

=== Group B ===
Team	Pld	W	D	L	GF	GA	GD	Pts
Paraguay	3	2	0	1	15	8	+7	6
Belgium	3	1	1	1	14	12	+2	4
Morocco	3	1	1	1	15	16	−1	4
Norway	3	1	0	2	12	20	−8	3

18 April
16:00 UTC+3

Belgium	4–4	Morocco
El Merboh 19', 24'; Channouf 24'; Dillien 24'	Report	Qoli 11', 36'; Abdessamade 21'; Laaraj 28'

Ice Palace, Maladzyechna
18 April
19:00 UTC+3

Paraguay	6–1	Norway
Herrera 16'; Espinoza 19'; Saffe 25', 30'; Salinas 27'; Cáceres 28'	Report	Bjelland 10'

Minsk Sports Palace, Minsk
19 April
16:00 UTC+3

Norway	9–7	Morocco
Djedje 3', 20' (pen.), 37'; Bjelland 9'; Ersland 27', 29'; Lyngbø 31', 33'; Aano 40'	Report	Ammed 4', 19'; Abdessamade 6'; Smail 9'; Laaraj 12'; Ahmed 20'; Bilal 20' (pen.)

Barysaw Physical Center, Barysaw
Attendance: 500
19 April
19:00 UTC+3

Paraguay	6–3	Belgium
Cáceres 10'; Herrera 14', 38', 40'; Espinoza 18'; Saffe 27'	Report	Dillien 17'; Tigra 26'; Vanderveck 34'

Minsk Sports Palace, Minsk
21 April
18:00 UTC+3

Belgium	7–2	Norway
Channouf 2', 9', 19'; Dillien 5', 18', 30'; Lemaire 36'	Report	Lyngbø 23'; Djedje 27'

Minsk Sports Palace, Minsk
21 April
20:00 UTC+3

Paraguay	3–4	Morocco
Salinas 3'; Herrera 30'; Espinoza 34'	Report	Laaraj 15'; Abdessamade 18'; Qoli 28'; Amin 32'

Minsk Sports Palace, Minsk

=== Group C ===
Team	Pld	W	D	L	GF	GA	GD	Pts
Colombia	3	3	0	0	19	3	+16	9
Czech Republic	3	1	1	1	4	6	−2	4
Venezuela	3	1	0	2	9	8	+1	3
Curaçao	3	0	1	2	4	19	−15	1

18 April
16:00 UTC+3

Colombia	5–0	Venezuela
Gómez 6'; Pinilla 13', 23'; Celis 21'; Cuervo 32'	Report

Sports Hall Victoria, Brest
18 April
18:00 UTC+3

Czech Republic	1–1	Curaçao
Abrhám 7'	Report	Koeiman 16'

Sports Hall Victoria, Brest
19 April
16:00 UTC+3

Venezuela	8–1	Curaçao
Moreno 3'; Méndez 5'; Colina 19'; Suárez 24', 38'; Mena 27'; Sánchez 32'; Ramos 40'	Report	Hoyer 31'

Sports Hall Victoria, Brest
19 April
18:00 UTC+3

Colombia	4–1	Czech Republic
Cuervo 16'; Murillo 27', 32'; Pinilla 31'	Report	Sop 24'

Sports Hall Victoria, Brest
20 April
17:00 UTC+3

Czech Republic	2–1	Venezuela
Fichtner 3'; Rott 24'	Report	Moreno 6'

Sports Hall Victoria, Brest
20 April
19:00 UTC+3

Colombia	10–2	Curaçao
Gómez 12', 26'; Abril 17', 23'; Pinilla 27', 28'; Dimas 30'; Echavarría 31'; Martínez 38'; Castillo 39'	Report	Isenia 10'; Paulleta 24'

Sports Hall Victoria, Brest

=== Group D ===
Team	Pld	W	D	L	GF	GA	GD	Pts
Argentina	3	2	1	0	13	1	+12	7
Russia	3	2	1	0	11	5	+6	7
Slovakia	3	1	0	2	8	15	−7	3
Kyrgyzstan	3	0	0	3	2	13	−11	0

18 April
16:00 UTC+3

Argentina	10–0	Slovakia
Tapia 1', 3', 21'; Contreras 7'; Pires 7'; Cardone 12'; Grasso 17', 40'; Vázquez 19'; Mescolatti 24'	Report

Polessie University, Pinsk
18 April
18:00 UTC+3

Russia	6–1	Kyrgyzstan
Markov 5'; Zapletin 22', 36'; Senatorov 25'; Vardanjan 26'; Rahmanov 40'	Report	Kultaev 9'

Polessie University, Pinsk
19 April
16:00 UTC+3

Slovakia	5–1	Kyrgyzstan
Bahna 3'; Hubočan 15'; Németh 21'; Papajčík 27'; Ťažký 35'	Report	Abdraimov 1'

Polessie University, Pinsk
19 April
18:00 UTC+3

Argentina	1–1	Russia
Koltes 36'	Report	Rahmanov 37'

Polessie University, Pinsk
20 April
17:00 UTC+3

Russia	4–3	Slovakia
Harin 3', 23'; Chibirev 21'; Rahmanov 29'	Report	Pápež 25'; Baranovič 35', 37'

Polessie University, Pinsk
20 April
19:00 UTC+3

Argentina	2–0	Kyrgyzstan
Cardone 16'; Mescolatti 39'	Report

Polessie University, Pinsk

== Knockout stage ==
Quarter-finals
22 April — Minsk
Uruguay	4
Belgium (aet)	5
22 April — Brest
Colombia	5
Russia	3
22 April — Minsk
Paraguay	4
Belarus	0
22 April — Brest
Argentina (aet)	3
Czech Republic	2

Semi-finals
24 April — Minsk
Belgium	0
Colombia	6
24 April — Minsk
Paraguay	2
Argentina	1

Final
25 April — Minsk
Colombia	4
Paraguay	0
Third place
25 April — Minsk
Belgium	1
Argentina	7

=== Quarter-finals ===
22 April
19:00 UTC+3

Uruguay	4–5 (a.e.t.)	Belgium
Gentil 1', 22', 40'; Santos 26'	Report	Dillien 2', 49'; Lemaire 17', 20'; El Merboh 28'

Minsk Sports Palace, Minsk
22 April
19:00 UTC+3

Colombia	5–3	Russia
Cuervo 3'; Gómez 14', 18'; Pinilla 23'; Abril 26'	Report	Rahmanov 11'; Senatorov 18', 35'

Sports Hall Victoria, Brest
22 April
21:00 UTC+3

Paraguay	4–0	Belarus
Herrera 6', 19', 37'; Salinas 23'	Report

Minsk Sports Palace, Minsk
22 April
21:00 UTC+3

Argentina	3–2 (a.e.t.)	Czech Republic
Mescolatti 10'; Tapia 12', 46'	Report	Sop 2'; Rott 14'

Sports Hall Victoria, Brest

=== Semi-finals ===
24 April
19:00 UTC+3

Belgium	0–6	Colombia
	Report	Gómez 3', 25'; Pinilla 9'; Cuervo 10', 15'; Abril 29'

Minsk-Arena, Minsk
24 April
21:00 UTC+3

Paraguay	2–1	Argentina
Herrera 9', 17'	Report	Mescolatti 3'

Minsk-Arena, Minsk

=== Third place play-off ===
25 April
18:30 UTC+3

Belgium	1–7	Argentina
De Brandt 26'	Report	Contreras 14', 16'; Mescolatti 15', 18', 27'; Tapia 26'; Grasso 38'

Minsk-Arena, Minsk

=== Final ===
25 April
20:30 UTC+3

Colombia	4–0	Paraguay
Gómez 5'; Cuervo 17'; Abril 20'; Dimas 35'	Report

Minsk-Arena, Minsk

2015 AMF Futsal World Cup winners

Colombia
Third title

== Top goalscorers ==
10 goals

- (Paraguay) Darío Herrera
- (Uruguay) Marcio Gentil

8 goals

- (Colombia) Camilo Gómez

7 goals

- (Argentina) Marcelo Mescolatti
- (Belgium) Steven Dillien
- (Colombia) Jhon Pinilla

6 goals

- (Argentina) Miguel Tapia
- (Colombia) Jorge Cuervo

5 goals

- (Colombia) Diego Abril

4 goals

- (Belgium) Hicham Channouf
- (Norway) Thierry Djedje
- (Russia) Afgan Rahmanov

3 goals

- (Argentina) Facundo Contreras
- (Argentina) Renzo Grasso
- (Belgium) Bilal El Merboh
- (Belgium) Antoine Lemaire
- (Brazil) Rafael Duran
- (Morocco) El Hafid Abdessamade
- (Morocco) Yassine Laaraj
- (Morocco) Yassine Qoli
- (Norway) Thomas Lyngbø
- (Paraguay) Jorge Espinoza
- (Paraguay) Nicolás Saffe
- (Paraguay) Éver Salinas
- (Russia) Roman Senatorov

2 goals

- (Argentina) Mariano Cardone
- (Australia) Matthew Hoole
- (Australia) Grant Lynch
- (Belarus) Vladislav Seliuk
- (Belarus) Artiom Yakubov
- (Brazil) Julio César Feitosa
- (Colombia) Alejandro Dimas
- (Colombia) Andrés Murillo
- (Czech Republic) Miroslav Rott
- (Czech Republic) Martin Sop
- (Morocco) El Hammouchi Ammed
- (Norway) Jørgen Bjelland
- (Norway) Christian Ersland
- (Paraguay) Óscar Cáceres
- (Russia) Sergej Harin
- (Russia) Mihail Zapletin
- (Slovakia) Jakub Baranovič
- (Uruguay) Mauricio Gianechini
- (Venezuela) Humberto Moreno
- (Venezuela) Énderson Suárez

1 goal

- (Argentina) Diego Koltes
- (Argentina) Gonzalo Pires
- (Argentina) Diego Vázquez
- (Belgium) Angelo De Brandt
- (Belgium) Soufiane Tigra
- (Belgium) Domien Vanderveck
- (Belarus) Alekséi Nalivaiko
- (Belarus) Dmitri Tesliuk
- (Brazil) Gustavo Camargo
- (Brazil) Leonardo Rocha
- (Colombia) John Celis
- (Colombia) Felipe Echavarría
- (Colombia) Cristofer Martínez
- (Colombia) Diego Castillo
- (Curaçao) Luigino Hoyer
- (Curaçao) Stallone Isenia
- (Curaçao) Dannick Koeiman
- (Curaçao) Jean Paulleta
- (Czech Republic) Tomáš Abrhám
- (Czech Republic) Tomáš Fichtner
- (Kyrgyzstan) Daniar Abdraimov
- (Kyrgyzstan) Adilet Kultaev
- (Morocco) Alovaen Ahmed
- (Morocco) Bilal Amin
- (Morocco) Anin Bilal
- (Morocco) El Farrousi Smail
- (Norway) Alf Jakob Aano
- (Russia) Andrej Chibirev
- (Russia) Konstantin Markov
- (Russia) Boris Vardanjan
- (Slovakia) Anton Bahna
- (Slovakia) Miloš Hubočan
- (Slovakia) Michal Németh
- (Slovakia) Vladimír Papajčík
- (Slovakia) Jozef Pápež
- (Slovakia) Libor Ťažký
- (Uruguay) Elio Hernández
- (Uruguay) Esteban Lorier
- (Uruguay) Augusto Santos
- (Uruguay) Leonardo Triunfo
- (Venezuela) Marco Colina
- (Venezuela) Robert Mena
- (Venezuela) Carlos Méndez
- (Venezuela) Roberto Ramos
- (Venezuela) Paolo Sánchez

== Tournament team rankings ==
Pos.	Team	Pld	W	D	L	Pts	GF	GA	GD
1	Colombia	6	6	0	0	18	34	6	+28
2	Paraguay	6	4	0	2	12	21	13	+8
3	Argentina	6	4	1	1	13	24	6	+18
4	Belgium	6	2	1	3	7	20	29	−9
Eliminated in the quarter-finals
5	Uruguay	4	3	0	1	9	16	10	+6
6	Russia	4	2	1	1	7	14	10	+4
7	Belarus	4	2	0	2	6	6	9	−3
8	Czech Republic	4	1	1	2	4	6	9	−3
Eliminated in the group stage
9	Morocco	3	1	1	1	4	15	16	−1
10	Brazil	3	1	0	2	3	7	5	+2
11	Venezuela	3	1	0	2	3	9	8	+1
12	Slovakia	3	1	0	2	3	8	15	−7
13	Norway	3	1	0	2	3	12	20	−8
14	Curaçao	3	0	1	2	1	4	19	−15
15	Australia	3	0	0	3	0	4	14	−10
16	Kyrgyzstan	3	0	0	3	0	2	13	−11
