= UEFS Futsal Men's Championship =

Futsal competition

The UEFS Futsal Championship or Eurofutsal was the main national futsal competition for the UEFS nations. It was first held in 1989.

== Results ==
Year	Host	Final			Third place match
Year	Host	Champion	Score	Second place	Third place	Score	Fourth place
1989; Details	Spain	Portugal		Spain	Czechoslovakia	4–1	Israel
1990; Details	Portugal	Portugal		Czechoslovakia	Spain		England
1992; Details	Portugal	Spain		Russia	Portugal		Israel
1995; Details	Morocco	Slovakia	2–1	Morocco	Russia		Czech Republic
1998; Details	Slovakia	Russia	5–0	Spain	Slovakia		Belarus
2004; Details	Belarus	Belarus	4–0	Czech Republic	Russia	12–3	Ukraine
2006; Details	Catalonia	Russia	3–1	Catalonia	Czech Republic	4–3	Belgium
2008; Details	Belgium	Russia	3–3 aet (3–2 p)	Czech Republic	Belarus	2–1	Belgium
2010; Details	Russia	Russia	5–2	Belgium	Czech Republic	4–4 aet (2–1 p)	Belarus
2012; Details	Belarus	Belgium	4–1	Czech Republic	Russia	4–1	Catalonia
2014; Details	Czech Republic	Belarus	2–1	Belgium	Catalonia	2–1	Russia
2016; Details	Russia	Russia	5–4 (aet)	Italy	Czech Republic	and	Kazakhstan
2018; Details	Catalonia	Belgium	4–2	Czech Republic	Russia	and	Latvia

== Performance by members ==
=== Medal count ===
Rank	Nation	Gold	Silver	Bronze	Total
1	Russia	5	1	4	10
2	Belgium	2	2	0	4
3	Belarus	2	0	1	3
3	Portugal	2	0	1	3
5	Spain	1	2	1	4
6	Slovakia	1	0	1	2
7	Czech Republic	0	5	4	9
8	Catalonia	0	1	1	2
9	Italy	0	1	0	1
9	Morocco	0	1	0	1
11	Kazakhstan	0	0	1	1
11	Latvia	0	0	1	1
Totals (12 entries)		13	13	15	41

=== Participation details ===
Team	1989 (Spain) (8)	1990 (Portugal) (8)	1992 (Portugal) (10)	1995 (Morocco) (10)	1998 (Slovakia) (8)	2004 (Belarus) (8)	2006 (Catalonia) (10)	2008 (Belgium) (8)	2010 (Russia) (11)	2012 (Belarus) (9)	2014 (Czech Republic) (9)	2016 (Russia) (8)	2018 (Catalonia) (8)	Years
Abkhazia	×	×	×	×	×	×	×	×	11th	×	×	×	×	1
Armenia	×	×	×	×	×	6th	×	×	×	×	×	×	×	1
Australia	×	×	×	×	×	×	10th	×	×	×	×	×	×	1
(Basque Country (autonomous community)) Basque Country	×	×	×	×	×	×	8th	×	×	×	9th	×	×	2
Belarus	×	×	9th	8th	4th	1st	×	3rd	4th	5th	1st	5th	×	9
Belgium	×	×	×	×	8th	5th	4th	4th	2nd	1st	2nd	×	1st	8
Bosnia and Herzegovina	×	×	×	×	×	×	×	×	×	×	×	×	5th	1
Catalonia	×	×	×	×	×	7th	2nd	8th	6th	4th	3rd	×	7th	7
Czech Republic/ Czechoslovakia	3rd	2nd	×	4th	5th	2nd	3rd	2nd	3rd	2nd	6th	3rd	2nd	12
England	×	4th	10th	×	×	×	×	×	×	×	×	×	×	2
France	7th	×	8th	9th	6th	×	×	6th	×	×	×	6th	6th	7
Hungary	8th	7th	×	×	×	×	×	×	×	×	×	×	×	2
Hungary	8th	7th	×	×	×	×	×	×	×	×	×	×	×	2
Ireland	x	×	×	x	×	x	×	x	x	×	1			
Italy	6th	8th	6th	×	×	×	6th	×	×	×	×	2nd	×	5
Kazakhstan	×	×	×	×	×	×	×	×	×	×	×	3rd	×	1
Kyrgyzstan	×	×	×	×	×	×	×	×	9th	×	×	×	×	1
Latvia	×	×	×	×	×	×	×	×	5th	9th	×	×	3rd	3
Moldova	×	×	7th	10th	×	×	×	×	×	×	×	×	×	2
Morocco	×	×	×	2nd	×	×	×	×	×	×	×	×	×	1
Netherlands	5th	6th	×	×	×	×	×	×	×	×	×	×	×	2
Norway	×	×	×	×	×	8th	5th	7th	×	7th	8th	7th	×	6
Portugal	1st	1st	3rd	5th	7th	×	×	×	×	×	×	×	×	5
Russia	×	×	2nd	3rd	1st	3rd	1st	1st	1st	3rd	4th	1st	3rd	11
Saint Helena	×	×	×	×	×	×	7th	×	×	×	×	×	×	1
Slovakia	×	×	5th	1st	3rd	×	×	×	×	6th	5th	×	×	5
South Ossetia	×	×	×	×	×	×	×	×	7th	8th	×	×	×	2
Spain	2nd	3rd	1st	6th	2nd	×	×	×	×	×	×	×	8th	6
Ukraine	×	×	×	×	×	4th	×	5th	10th	×	×	×	×	3

Legend

- 1st – Champions
- 2nd – Runners-up
- 3rd – Third place
- 4th – Fourth place
- 5th-11th — Fifth to Eleventh place
- Q — Qualified for upcoming tournament
- •• — Qualified but withdrew
- • — Did not qualify
- × — Did not enter / Withdrew from the European Championship / Banned
- — Hosts
