= Junín Department =

Junín Department may refer to:

- Junín Department, Mendoza, Argentina
- Junín Department, San Luis, Argentina
- Department of Junín, Peru

== See also ==
- Junín (disambiguation)
