= 2006 UEFS Futsal Men's Championship =

VII. European Men's Championship

Tournament details
- Host country: Catalonia
- Dates: 28 November – 3 December
- Teams: 10 (from 1 confederation)
- Venue: 3 (in 3 host cities)

Final positions
- Champions: Russia (2nd title)
- Runners-up: Catalonia
- Third place: Czech Republic
- Fourth place: Belgium

Tournament statistics
- Matches played: 26
- Goals scored: 223 (8.58 per match)

The 2006 UEFS Futsal Men's Championship was the seventh UEFS futsal championship held in Catalonia, with 10 teams in competition. The matches were played from 28 November to 3 December in Santa Coloma de Farners, Arbúcies and Sant Hilari Sacalm.

== Teams ==
Group 1 Norway (Basque Country (autonomous community)) Basque Country Czech Republic Israel	Group 2 Belgium Russia Australia	Group 3 Catalonia Italy Saint Helena

== First round ==
=== Group 1 ===
Team	Pts	P	W	D	L	+	-	DG
Czech Republic	9	3	3	0	0	15	2	+13
Norway	6	3	2	0	1	12	12	=
(Basque Country (autonomous community)) Basque Country	3	3	1	0	2	10	15	-5
Israel	0	3	0	0	3	2	10	-8

28 November 2006; 16:00
28 November 2006; 16:00	Czech Republic	7-0	(Basque Country (autonomous community)) Basque Country	Pavelló Municipal de Santa Coloma de Farners
28 November 2006; 16:00	Macek (2); Šmeral(2); Neumann (2); Rajnoch			Pavelló Municipal de Santa Coloma de Farners

28 November 2006 - 20:00
28 November 2006 - 20:00	Norway	3-1	Israel	Pavelló Municipal de Santa Coloma de Farners
28 November 2006 - 20:00	Dje Dje 19'; Folgerø 27'; Nikodemussen 30'			Pavelló Municipal de Santa Coloma de Farners

29 November 2006 - 16:00
29 November 2006 - 16:00	Czech Republic	3-0	Israel	Pavelló Municipal de Santa Coloma de Farners
29 November 2006 - 16:00	Šnídl (2); Rajnoch			Pavelló Municipal de Santa Coloma de Farners

29 November 2006 - 20:00
29 November 2006 - 20:00	Norway	7-6	(Basque Country (autonomous community)) Basque Country	Pavelló Municipal de Santa Coloma de Farners

30 November 2006 - 16:00
30 November 2006 - 16:00	Basque Country (Basque Country (autonomous community))	4-1	Israel	Pavelló Municipal de Santa Coloma de Farners

30 November 2006 - 20:00
30 November 2006 - 20:00	Czech Republic	5-2	Norway	Pavelló Municipal de Santa Coloma de Farners
30 November 2006 - 20:00	Miczka (2); Dorozlo (2); Rajnoch		Folgerø 34'; Lopes 38'	Pavelló Municipal de Santa Coloma de Farners

=== Group 2 ===
Team	Pts	P	W	D	L	+	-	DG
Russia	6	2	2	0	0	25	2	+23
Belgium	3	2	1	0	1	12	8	+4
Australia	0	2	0	0	2	1	28	-27

28 November 2006 - 21:00
28 November 2006 - 21:00	Russia	18-0	Australia	Pavelló Municipal d'Arbúcies

29 November 2006 - 20:30
29 November 2006 - 20:30	Belgium	10-1	Australia	Pavelló Municipal d'Arbúcies

30 November 2006 - 20:30
30 November 2006 - 20:30	Russia	7-2	Belgium	Pavelló Municipal d'Arbúcies

=== Group 3 ===
Team	Pts	P	W	D	L	+	-	DG
Catalonia	4	2	1	1	0	8	4	+4
Saint Helena	4	2	1	1	0	6	5	+1
Italy	0	2	0	0	2	3	8	-5

28 November 2006 - 20:00
28 November 2006 - 20:00	Catalonia	3-3	Saint Helena	Pavelló Municipal de Sant Hilari Sacalm
28 November 2006 - 20:00	Gabri 15', 38' 39'		Bryers 18', 28'; Collian 30'	Pavelló Municipal de Sant Hilari Sacalm

29 November 2006 - 20:00
29 November 2006 - 20:00	Italy	2-3	Saint Helena	Pavelló Municipal de Sant Hilari Sacalm
29 November 2006 - 20:00	De Maria 17'; Licini 31'		Costa 22'; Maddison 36'; Corran 38'	Pavelló Municipal de Sant Hilari Sacalm

30 November 2006 - 20:00
30 November 2006 - 20:00	Catalonia	5-1	Italy	Pavelló Municipal de Sant Hilari Sacalm
30 November 2006 - 20:00	Gabri 6', 31'; Hermano 28', 29'; Collboni 23'		Licini 3'	Pavelló Municipal de Sant Hilari Sacalm

== Final round ==
Quarter-finals
1 December - Sant Hilari Sacalm
Czech Republic	5
Italy	2
1 December - Arbúcies
Russia	11
Saint Helena	0
1 December - Sant Hilari Sacalm
Norway	3
Belgium	6
1 December - Arbúcies
Catalonia	1
(Basque Country (autonomous community)) Basque Country	0

Semi-finals
2 December - Sta. Coloma de Farners
Czech Republic	1
Russia	5
2 December - Sta. Coloma de Farners
Belgium	3 (2)
Catalonia	3* (3)

Final
3 December - Sta. Coloma de Farners
Russia	3
Catalonia	1
Third place
3 December - Sta. Coloma de Farners
Czech Republic	4
Belgium	3

Quarterfinals

1 December - 18:30
1 December - 18:30	Czech Republic	5-2	Italy	Pavelló Municipal de Sant Hilari Sacalm
1 December - 18:30	Stojaník 12', 24; Macek 15', 22'; Šafránek 39'		Viscardi 28', 34'	Pavelló Municipal de Sant Hilari Sacalm

1 December - 18:30
1 December - 18:30	Russia	11-0	Saint Helena	Pavelló Municipal d'Arbúcies

1 December - 20:30
1 December - 20:30	Norway	3-6	Belgium	Pavelló Municipal de Sant Hilari Sacalm
1 December - 20:30	Kvisvik 17', 35'; Nikodemussen 13'		Vermeiren (3); Pauls; Heremans; Toullaux	Pavelló Municipal de Sant Hilari Sacalm

1 December - 20:30
1 December - 20:30	Catalonia	1-0	(Basque Country (autonomous community)) Basque Country	Pavelló Municipal d'Arbúcies
1 December - 20:30	Collboni 39'			Pavelló Municipal d'Arbúcies

9-10 places (1st)

1 December - 20:00
1 December - 20:00	Israel	15-1	Australia	Pavelló Municipal de Santa Coloma de Farners

5-8 places

2 December - 12:00
2 December - 12:00	Norway	6-3	(Basque Country (autonomous community)) Basque Country	Pavelló Municipal de Sant Hilari Sacalm
2 December - 12:00	Dje Dje 7', 37'; Arnesen 9', 22'; Nikodemusen 21'		J. Martínez (3)	Pavelló Municipal de Sant Hilari Sacalm

2 December - 12:00
2 December - 12:00	Italy	6-5	Saint Helena	Pavelló Municipal d'Arbúcies
2 December - 12:00	De Maria (2); Viscardi(2); Belloni; Licini			Pavelló Municipal d'Arbúcies

Semifinals

2 December - 18:30
2 December - 18:30	Czech Republic	1-5	Russia	Pavelló Municipal de Santa Coloma de Farners
2 December - 18:30	Neumann 12'			Pavelló Municipal de Santa Coloma de Farners

2 December - 20:30
2 December - 20:30	Belgium	3-3	Catalonia	Pavelló Municipal de Santa Coloma de Farners
2 December - 20:30		(2-3 P)	Isi 15', 28'; Osvald 4' pròrroga	Pavelló Municipal de Santa Coloma de Farners

9-10 places (2nd)

3 December - 10:00
3 December - 10:00	Australia	1-8	Israel	Pavelló Municipal d'Arbúcies

7-8 places

3 December - 10:00
3 December - 10:00	Basque Country (Basque Country (autonomous community))	7-9	Saint Helena	Pavelló Municipal de Sant Hilari Sacalm

5-6 places

3 December - 12:00
3 December - 12:00	Norway	11-6	Italy	Pavelló Municipal de Sant Hilari Sacalm

3rd-4th places

3 December - 16:00
3 December - 16:00	Czech Republic	4-3	Belgium	Pavelló Municipal de Santa Coloma de Farners
3 December - 16:00	Šafránek (2); Uhlíř; Maczek			Pavelló Municipal de Santa Coloma de Farners

Final

3 December - 18:00
3 December - 18:00	Catalonia	1-3	Russia	Pavelló Municipal de Santa Coloma de Farners
3 December - 18:00	Gabri '19		Ilha 12'; Konstantin 22', 36'	Pavelló Municipal de Santa Coloma de Farners

== Final standings ==
Final standings
	Russia
	Catalonia
	Czech Republic
4.	Belgium
5.	Norway
6.	Italy
7.	(Saint Helena) Santa Helena
8.	(Basque Country (autonomous community)) Basque Country
9.	Israel
10.	Australia

== See also ==
- UEFS Futsal Men's Championship
