= 2011 AMF Futsal Men's World Cup =

2011 X AMF Futsal Men's World Cup
Campeonato Mundial de Futsal AMF 2011
- Logo of the X AMF Futsal Men's World Cup

Tournament details
- Host country: Colombia
- Dates: 15–26 March
- Teams: 16 (from 4 confederations)
- Venue(s): 4 (in 4 host cities)

Final positions
- Champions: Colombia (2nd title)
- Runners-up: Paraguay
- Third place: Argentina
- Fourth place: Russia

Tournament statistics
- Matches played: 32
- Goals scored: 257 (8.03 per match)
- Top scorer(s): (Colombia) Jhon Pinilla (17 goals each)

The 2011 AMF Futsal Men's World Cup was the 10th edition of the AMF Futsal World Cup. The tournament was held in Colombia from 15 to 26 March in the cities of Bucaramanga, Bogotá, Villavicencio and Bello. Sixteen national teams from four confederations (South America, North America, Europe and Oceania) participated in the tournament. Colombia won the tournament by defeating Paraguay 8–2 in the final, achieving its second title.

== Venues ==
Matches were played in four venues across four cities: Bello, Bogotá, Bucaramanga and Villavicencio.

Bello	2011 AMF Futsal Men's World Cup is located in Colombia	Bogotá
Coliseo Tulio Ospina	2011 AMF Futsal Men's World Cup is located in Colombia	Coliseo El Salitre
Capacity: 7,000	2011 AMF Futsal Men's World Cup is located in Colombia	Capacity: 7,000
Bucaramanga	2011 AMF Futsal Men's World Cup is located in Colombia	Villavicencio
Coliseo Bicentenario	2011 AMF Futsal Men's World Cup is located in Colombia	Coliseo Álvaro Mesa Amaya
Capacity: 7,000	2011 AMF Futsal Men's World Cup is located in Colombia	Capacity: 4,000

== Participating teams ==
In addition to host nation Colombia, 15 nations qualified.

Tournament	Date	Venue	Qualified teams	
Host	—	—	1	Colombia
2007 AMF Futsal Men's World Cup	31 August – 9 September 2007	Argentina	1	Paraguay
2010 UEFS Futsal Men's Championship	3 – 8 May 2010	Russia	5	Russia; ~~Belgium~~; Czech Republic; Belarus; ~~Latvia~~; Catalonia; South Ossetia^{1}
Oceania qualification tournament	23 – 31 October 2010	Malaysia	1	New Zealand
Central America selected teams	—	—	2	Canada; Mexico
South America selected teams	—	—	6	Argentina; Brazil; Ecuador; Peru; Uruguay; Venezuela
Total			16	

1. Teams that made their debut.

== Group stage ==
The group winners and runners up advanced to the quarter-finals.

=== Group A ===
Team	Pld	W	D	L	GF	GA	GD	Pts
Argentina	3	2	1	0	14	10	+4	7
Russia	3	2	0	1	11	9	+2	6
Brazil	3	1	1	1	13	13	0	4
South Ossetia	3	0	0	3	6	12	−6	0

15 March
19:30 UTC−5

Argentina	5–5	Brazil

Coliseo Bicentenario, Bucaramanga
15 March
21:00 UTC−5

Russia	3–1	South Ossetia

Coliseo Bicentenario, Bucaramanga
17 March
19:30 UTC−5

Brazil	4–3	South Ossetia

Coliseo Bicentenario, Bucaramanga
17 March
21:00 UTC−5

Argentina	4–3	Russia

Coliseo Bicentenario, Bucaramanga
18 March
19:30 UTC−5

Russia	5–4	Brazil

Coliseo Bicentenario, Bucaramanga
18 March
21:00 UTC−5

Argentina	5–2	South Ossetia

Coliseo Bicentenario, Bucaramanga

=== Group B ===
Team	Pld	W	D	L	GF	GA	GD	Pts
Peru	3	3	0	0	15	7	+8	9
Catalonia	3	2	0	1	13	10	+3	6
Uruguay	3	1	0	2	12	13	−1	3
Canada	3	0	0	3	9	19	−10	0

16 March
19:30 UTC−5

Peru	3–2	Uruguay

Coliseo Álvaro Mesa Amaya, Villavicencio
16 March
21:00 UTC−5

Catalonia	4–3	Canada

Coliseo Álvaro Mesa Amaya, Villavicencio
17 March
19:30 UTC−5

Uruguay	8–3	Canada

Coliseo Álvaro Mesa Amaya, Villavicencio
17 March
21:00 UTC−5

Peru	5–2	Catalonia

Coliseo Álvaro Mesa Amaya, Villavicencio
18 March
19:30 UTC−5

Catalonia	7–2	Uruguay

Coliseo Álvaro Mesa Amaya, Villavicencio
18 March
21:00 UTC−5

Peru	7–3	Canada

Coliseo Álvaro Mesa Amaya, Villavicencio

=== Group C ===
Team	Pld	W	D	L	GF	GA	GD	Pts
Colombia	3	3	0	0	33	0	+33	9
Belarus	3	2	0	1	10	13	−3	6
Ecuador	3	1	0	2	8	24	−16	3
New Zealand	3	0	0	3	4	18	−14	0

16 March
19:30 UTC−5

Colombia	14–0	Ecuador

Coliseo El Salitre, Bogotá
16 March
21:00 UTC−5

Belarus	4–0	New Zealand

Coliseo El Salitre, Bogotá
17 March
19:30 UTC−5

Ecuador	6–4	New Zealand

Coliseo El Salitre, Bogotá
17 March
21:00 UTC−5

Colombia	11–0	Belarus

Coliseo El Salitre, Bogotá
18 March
19:30 UTC−5

Belarus	6–2	Ecuador

Coliseo El Salitre, Bogotá
18 March
21:00 UTC−5

Colombia	8–0	New Zealand

Coliseo El Salitre, Bogotá

=== Group D ===
Team	Pld	W	D	L	GF	GA	GD	Pts
Paraguay	3	2	1	0	22	4	+18	7
Venezuela	3	2	1	0	18	3	+15	7
Czech Republic	3	1	0	2	6	7	−1	3
Mexico	3	0	0	3	1	33	−32	0

16 March
19:30 UTC−5

Paraguay	2–2	Venezuela

Coliseo Tulio Ospina, Bello
16 March
21:00 UTC−5

Czech Republic	4–0	Mexico

Coliseo Tulio Ospina, Bello
17 March
19:30 UTC−5

Venezuela	11–0	Mexico

Coliseo Tulio Ospina, Bello
17 March
21:00 UTC−5

Paraguay	2–1	Czech Republic

Coliseo Tulio Ospina, Bello
18 March
19:30 UTC−5

Czech Republic	1–5	Venezuela

Coliseo Tulio Ospina, Bello
18 March
21:00 UTC−5

Paraguay	18–1	Mexico

Coliseo Tulio Ospina, Bello

== Knockout stage ==
Quarter-finals
20 March — Bogotá
Argentina	7
Catalonia	0
21 March — Bogotá
Colombia	4
Venezuela	2
20 March — Bogotá
Peru	2
Russia	6
21 March — Bogotá
Paraguay	3
Belarus	2

Semi-finals
23 March — Bucaramanga
Argentina	2
Colombia	3
24 March — Bello
Russia	5 (2)
Paraguay	5 (3)

Final
26 March — Bogotá
Colombia	8
Paraguay	2
Third place
26 March — Bogotá
Argentina	8
Russia	4

=== Quarter-finals ===
20 March
19:30 UTC−5

Argentina	7–0	Catalonia

Coliseo El Salitre, Bogotá
20 March
21:30 UTC−5

Peru	2–6	Russia

Coliseo El Salitre, Bogotá
21 March
19:30 UTC−5

Paraguay	3–2	Belarus

Coliseo El Salitre, Bogotá
21 March
21:30 UTC−5

Colombia	4–2	Venezuela

Coliseo El Salitre, Bogotá

=== Semi-finals ===
23 March
19:30 UTC−5

Argentina	2–3	Colombia

Coliseo Bicentenario, Bucaramanga
24 March
21:30 UTC−5

Russia	5–5	Paraguay
Penalties
	2–3

Coliseo Tulio Ospina, Bello

=== Third place play-off ===
26 March
19:30 UTC−5

Argentina	8–4	Russia

Coliseo El Salitre, Bogotá

=== Final ===
26 March
21:00 UTC−5

Colombia	8–2	Paraguay

Coliseo El Salitre, Bogotá

2011 AMF Futsal World Cup winners

Colombia
Second title

== Tournament team rankings ==
Pos.	Team	Pld	W	D	L	Pts	GF	GA	GD
1	Colombia	6	6	0	0	18	33	6	+27
2	Paraguay	6	3	2	1	11	32	19	+13
3	Argentina	6	4	1	1	13	31	18	+13
4	Russia	6	3	1	2	10	26	24	+2
Eliminated in the quarter-finals
5	Peru	4	3	0	1	9	17	13	+4
6	Venezuela	4	2	1	1	7	16	7	+9
7	Catalonia	4	2	0	2	6	13	16	−3
8	Belarus	4	2	0	2	6	12	16	−4
Eliminated in the group stage
9	Brazil	3	1	1	1	4	12	12	0
10	Uruguay	3	1	0	2	3	12	13	−1
11	Czech Republic	3	1	0	2	3	6	7	−1
12	Ecuador	3	1	0	2	3	8	24	−16
13	South Ossetia	3	0	0	3	0	6	11	−5
14	Canada	3	0	0	3	0	8	19	−11
15	New Zealand	3	0	0	3	0	4	18	−14
16	Mexico	3	0	0	3	0	1	29	−28
