= 1992–93 in Russian futsal =

== National team ==
Win Draw Loss

18 September 1992 Friendly (12)	Belgium	4–6	Russia	Eindhoven
			Eremenko; Stepanov A. Zakerov; Solodovnyk

19 September 1992 Friendly (13)	Czechoslovakia	1–3	Russia	Sittard
			Tchoukhlov; Kochtchoug

20 September 1992 Friendly (14)	Netherlands	3–2	Russia	Sittard
			Stepanov A. Zakerov

17 November 1992 WC 1992 (15)	Russia	3–8	United States	Tsim Sha Tsui
	Eremenko 33' 39'; Tchoukhlov 36'	Report	Clavjo 6'; Agoos 15' 22'; Borja 16' 30'; Woodberry 27'; Fernandez 29'; Irvine 39'	Stadium: Kowloon Park Sports Center; Attendance: 256; Referee: (Hong Kong) Samuel Chan Yam Ming

19 November 1992 WC 1992 (16)	China	1–10	Russia	Hung Hom
	Li Ming 5'	Report	Kochtchoug 5'; Tchoukhlov 16'; Eremenko 23' 27' 28' 29' 30' 31' 33'; Eprintsev 30'	Stadium: Hong Kong Coliseum; Attendance: 1 245; Referee: (Costa Rica) Jorge G. Cantillano Castro

21 November 1992 WC 1992 (17)	Spain	7–7	Russia	Tsim Sha Tsui
	Vicentin 16' 32' 34'; Julian 20'; Paco 32' 35'; Alvaro 37'	Report	Mirgalimov 19'; Eremenko 21' 25' 27' 37' 38' 38'	Stadium: Kowloon Park Sports Center; Attendance: 226; Referee: (Egypt) Ali Hussein Mousa

=== National students team ===
3rd World University Futsal Championship in Málaga
Russian students' futsal team was represented by club UPI Yekaterinburg

Group A
Team	Pld	W	D	L	GF	GA	GD	Pts	ESP	BEL	TAI	USA	SMR
Spain (H)	4	4	0	0	55	5	+50	8	—	8–1	17–3	15–0	15–1
Belgium	4	3	0	1	19	11	+8	6	1–8	—	6–2	6–0	6–1
Taiwan	4	2	0	2	17	28	−11	4	3–17	2–6	—	7–4	5–1
United States	4	0	1	3	6	30	−24	1	0–15	0–6	4–7	—	2–2
San Marino	4	0	1	3	5	28	−23	1	1–15	1–6	1–5	2–2	—

(H) Hosts

Group B
Team	Pld	W	D	L	GF	GA	GD	Pts	ITA	BRA	RUS	POR	CYP
Italy	4	4	0	0	26	6	+20	8	—	2–1	4–3	5–1	15–1
Brazil	4	3	0	1	24	7	+17	6	1–2	—	5–2	4–3	14–0
Russia	4	2	0	2	27	15	+12	4	3–4	2–5	—	11–2	11–4
Portugal	4	1	0	3	13	24	−11	2	1–5	3–4	2–11	—	7–4
Cyprus	4	0	0	4	9	47	−38	0	1–15	0–14	4–11	4–7	—

Semifinals
Spain	3
Brazil	2
Italy	4(1)
Belgium	4(4)

Final
Spain	8
Belgium	3

3rd Place
Brazil	2
Italy	3

5th Place
Taiwan	4
Russia	11

3rd Place
United States	1
Portugal	13

== Top League ==
=== Preliminary round ===
==== Group A ====
Pos	Team	Pld	W	D	L	GF	GA	GD	Pts	Qualification
1	(Moscow) Dina Moskva (A)	14	10	3	1	92	35	+57	23	Qualification to Championship group
2	(Chelyabinsk Oblast) Fenix Chelyabinsk (A)	14	8	3	3	85	57	+28	19	Qualification to Championship group
3	KSM-24 Moscow (A)	14	8	2	4	72	48	+24	18	Qualification to Championship group
4	(Sverdlovsk Oblast) Stroitel Verkh-Neyvinsky	14	5	4	5	75	82	−7	14	Qualification to Relegation group
5	(Novgorod Oblast) Zarya Novgorod	14	2	2	10	51	84	−33	6	Qualification to Relegation group
6	(Komi Republic) Smena Vorkuta (R)	10	0	0	10	29	98	−69	0	Withdraw after 2nd tour

Rules for classification: 1) points; 2) goal difference; 3) number of goals scored.
(A) Advance to a further round; (R) Relegated

==== Group B ====
Pos	Team	Pld	W	D	L	GF	GA	GD	Pts	Qualification
1	Spartak Moscow (A)	15	11	2	2	67	38	+29	24	Qualification to Championship group
2	(Sverdlovsk Oblast) UPI Yekaterinburg (A)	15	10	2	3	68	43	+25	22	Qualification to Championship group
3	Dina-MAB Moscow (A)	15	9	3	3	77	39	+38	21	Qualification to Championship group
4	(Krasnoyarsk Krai) Zarya Yemelyanovo	15	7	1	7	61	51	+10	15	Qualification to Relegation group
5	(Novosibirsk Oblast) Sibiryak Novosibirsk	15	3	1	11	40	67	−27	7	Qualification to Relegation group
6	(Sverdlovsk Oblast) AlAn Yekaterinburg	15	0	1	14	37	112	−75	1	Qualification to Relegation group

Rules for classification: 1) points; 2) goal difference; 3) number of goals scored.
(A) Advance to a further round

=== Championship group ===
Pos	Team	Pld	W	D	L	GF	GA	GD	Pts
1	(Moscow) Dina Moskva (C)	15	14	0	1	98	41	+57	28
2	Dina-MAB Moscow	15	8	2	5	59	53	+6	18
3	(Chelyabinsk Oblast) Fenix Chelyabinsk	15	8	1	6	71	56	+15	17
4	KSM-24 Moscow	15	8	0	7	59	50	+9	16
5	Spartak Moscow	15	2	3	10	40	73	−33	7
6	(Sverdlovsk Oblast) UPI Yekaterinburg	15	1	2	12	35	89	−54	4

Rules for classification: 1) points; 2) goal difference; 3) number of goals scored.
(C) Champions

=== Relegation group ===
Pos	Team	Pld	W	D	L	GF	GA	GD	Pts	Qualification
7	(Sverdlovsk Oblast) Stroitel Verkh-Neyvinsky	11	9	0	2	55	35	+20	18	
8	(Novgorod Oblast) Zarya Novgorod	11	6	2	3	52	34	+18	14	
9	(Novosibirsk Oblast) Sibiryak Novosibirsk	11	5	2	4	48	41	+7	12	
10	(Krasnoyarsk Krai) Zarya Yemelyanovo (R)	11	3	2	6	25	39	−14	8	Relegation to First League
11	(Sverdlovsk Oblast) AlAn Yekaterinburg (R)	8	0	0	8	10	41	−31	0	Withdraw after 2nd game in 2nd tour

Rules for classification: 1) points; 2) goal difference; 3) number of goals scored.
(R) Relegated

== National Cup ==
=== Preliminary round ===
==== Group 1-A ====
Pos	Team	Pld	W	D	L	GF	GA	GD	Pts	(Sverdlovsk Oblast) UPI	(Moscow) TOR	(Sverdlovsk Oblast) ROS	(Nizhny Novgorod Oblast) SYU
1	(Sverdlovsk Oblast) UPI Yekaterinburg (H)	3	2	1	0	16	8	+8	5	—	2–2	9–3	5–3
2	MKZ Torpedo Moscow	3	1	2	0	11	9	+2	4	2–2	—	7–5	2–2
3	(Sverdlovsk Oblast) Rossiya Yekaterinburg (H)	3	1	0	2	13	19	−6	2	3–9	5–7	—	5–3
4	(Nizhny Novgorod Oblast) Soyuz Nizhny Novgorod	3	0	1	2	8	12	−4	1	3–5	2–2	3–5	—

(H) Hosts

==== Group 1-B ====
Pos	Team	Pld	W	D	L	GF	GA	GD	Pts	(Sverdlovsk Oblast) STR	(Tatarstan) KOS	(Sverdlovsk Oblast) BIN	(Khanty-Mansi Autonomous Okrug) NPC
1	(Sverdlovsk Oblast) Stroitel Verkh-Neyvinsky	3	3	0	0	22	7	+15	6	—	8–4	8–2	6–1
2	(Tatarstan) Kosmos Kazan	3	2	0	1	26	13	+13	4	4–8	—	10–3	12–2
3	(Sverdlovsk Oblast) Binom Yekaterinburg (H)	3	1	0	2	13	21	−8	2	2–8	3–10	—	8–3
4	(Khanty-Mansi Autonomous Okrug) Neftyanik Pokachi	3	0	0	3	6	26	−20	0	1–6	2–12	3–8	—

(H) Hosts

==== Group 1-Final ====
Pos	Team	Pld	W	D	L	GF	GA	GD	Pts	(Sverdlovsk Oblast) STR	(Sverdlovsk Oblast) UPI	(Tatarstan) KOS	(Moscow) TOR
1	(Sverdlovsk Oblast) Stroitel Verkh-Neyvinsky (A)	3	3	0	0	22	11	+11	6	—	7–5	8–4	7–2
2	(Sverdlovsk Oblast) UPI Yekaterinburg (A)	3	1	1	1	18	13	+5	3	5–7	—	11–4	2–2
3	(Tatarstan) Kosmos Kazan	3	1	0	2	15	23	−8	2	4–8	4–11	—	7–4
4	MKZ Torpedo Moscow	3	0	1	2	8	16	−8	1	2–7	2–2	4–7	—

(A) Advance to a further round

Pos	Team	Pld	W	D	L	GF	GA	GD	Pts	(Sverdlovsk Oblast) ROS	(Nizhny Novgorod Oblast) SYU	(Sverdlovsk Oblast) BIN	(Khanty-Mansi Autonomous Okrug) NPC
5	(Sverdlovsk Oblast) Rossiya Yekaterinburg	3	3	0	0	27	9	+18	6	—	5–3	12–5	10–1
6	(Nizhny Novgorod Oblast) Soyuz Nizhny Novgorod	3	2	0	1	37	13	+24	4	3–5	—	15–5	19–3
7	(Sverdlovsk Oblast) Binom Yekaterinburg	3	1	0	2	18	30	−12	2	5–12	5–15	—	8–3
8	(Khanty-Mansi Autonomous Okrug) Neftyanik Pokachi	3	0	0	3	7	37	−30	0	1–10	3–19	3–8	—

==== Group 2-A ====
Pos	Team	Pld	W	D	L	GF	GA	GD	Pts	(Chelyabinsk Oblast) FNX	(Moscow) MAB	(Sverdlovsk Oblast) ALN	(Khanty-Mansi Autonomous Okrug) AVT
1	(Chelyabinsk Oblast) Fenix Chelyabinsk (H)	3	3	0	0	30	11	+19	6	—	7–4	12–3	11–4
2	Dina-MAB Moscow	3	2	0	1	25	10	+15	4	4–7	—	9–1	12–2
3	(Sverdlovsk Oblast) AlAn Yekaterinburg	3	1	0	2	10	23	−13	2	3–12	1–9	—	6–2
4	(Khanty-Mansi Autonomous Okrug) Avtomobilist Kogalym	3	0	0	3	8	29	−21	0	4–11	2–12	2–6	—

(H) Hosts

==== Group 2-B ====
Pos	Team	Pld	W	D	L	GF	GA	GD	Pts	(Moscow) KSM	(Sverdlovsk Oblast) UPI	(Sverdlovsk Oblast) LCH	(Sverdlovsk Oblast) MET
1	KSM-24 Moscow	3	3	0	0	32	6	+26	6	—	7–3	10–3	15–0
2	(Sverdlovsk Oblast) UPI-2 Yekaterinburg	3	2	0	1	20	12	+8	4	3–7	—	11–3	6–2
3	(Sverdlovsk Oblast) Luch Yekaterinburg	3	1	0	2	12	24	−12	2	3–10	3–11	—	6–3
4	(Sverdlovsk Oblast) Metallurg Serov	3	0	0	3	5	27	−22	0	0–15	2–6	3–6	—

==== Group 2-Final ====
Pos	Team	Pld	W	D	L	GF	GA	GD	Pts	(Chelyabinsk Oblast) FNX	(Moscow) KSM	(Moscow) MAB	(Sverdlovsk Oblast) UPI
1	(Chelyabinsk Oblast) Fenix Chelyabinsk (A)	3	2	1	0	17	10	+7	5	—	3–3	7–4	7–3
2	KSM-24 Moscow (A)	3	2	1	0	16	9	+7	5	3–3	—	6–3	7–3
3	Dina-MAB Moscow	3	1	0	2	13	15	−2	2	4–7	3–6	—	6–2
4	(Sverdlovsk Oblast) UPI-2 Yekaterinburg	3	0	0	3	8	20	−12	0	3–7	3–7	2–6	—

(A) Advance to a further round

Pos	Team	Pld	W	D	L	GF	GA	GD	Pts	(Sverdlovsk Oblast) LCH	(Sverdlovsk Oblast) ALN	(Sverdlovsk Oblast) MET	(Khanty-Mansi Autonomous Okrug) AVT
5	(Sverdlovsk Oblast) Luch Yekaterinburg	3	3	0	0	19	9	+10	6	—	3–1	6–3	10–5
6	(Sverdlovsk Oblast) AlAn Yekaterinburg	3	2	0	1	9	6	+3	4	1–3	—	2–1	6–2
7	(Sverdlovsk Oblast) Metallurg Serov	3	0	1	2	5	9	−4	1	3–6	1–2	—	1–1
8	(Khanty-Mansi Autonomous Okrug) Avtomobilist Kogalym	3	0	1	2	8	17	−9	1	5–10	2–6	1–1	—

==== Group 3-A ====
Pos	Team	Pld	W	D	L	GF	GA	GD	Pts	(Sverdlovsk Oblast) VIZ	(Novosibirsk Oblast) SIB	(Krasnoyarsk Krai) ZYM	(Sakha Republic) UNY
1	(Sverdlovsk Oblast) VIZ Yekaterinburg	3	3	0	0	18	9	+9	6	—	6–3	8–3	4–3
2	(Novosibirsk Oblast) Sibiryak Novosibirsk (H)	3	2	0	1	12	9	+3	4	3–6	—	4–3	5–0
3	(Krasnoyarsk Krai) Zarya Yemelyanovo	3	1	0	2	7	12	−5	2	3–8	3–4	—	1–0
4	(Sakha Republic) Universitet Yakutsk	3	0	0	3	3	10	−7	0	3–4	0–5	0–1	—

(H) Hosts

==== Group 3-B ====
Pos	Team	Pld	W	D	L	GF	GA	GD	Pts	(Moscow) SPM	(Moscow) TRS	(Sakhalin Oblast) MYS
1	Spartak Moscow	2	2	0	0	14	3	+11	4	—	6–3	8–0
2	Trasko Moscow	2	1	0	1	16	7	+9	2	3–6	—	13–1
3	(Sakhalin Oblast) Monolit Yuzhno-Sakhalinsk	2	0	0	2	1	21	−20	0	0–8	1–13	—

==== Group 3-Final ====
Pos	Team	Pld	W	D	L	GF	GA	GD	Pts	(Moscow) SPM	(Moscow) TRS	(Sverdlovsk Oblast) VIZ	(Novosibirsk Oblast) SIB
1	Spartak Moscow (A)	3	3	0	0	21	9	+12	6	—	6–3	6–4	9–2
2	Trasko Moscow (A)	3	2	0	1	15	13	+2	4	3–6	—	6–5	6–2
3	(Sverdlovsk Oblast) VIZ Yekaterinburg	3	1	0	2	15	15	0	2	4–6	5–6	—	6–3
4	(Novosibirsk Oblast) Sibiryak Novosibirsk	3	0	0	3	7	21	−14	0	2–9	2–6	3–6	—

(A) Advance to a further round

Pos	Team	Pld	W	D	L	GF	GA	GD	Pts	(Krasnoyarsk Krai) ZYM	(Sakha Republic) UNY	(Sakhalin Oblast) MYS
5	(Krasnoyarsk Krai) Zarya Yemelyanovo	2	2	0	0	8	5	+3	4	—	1–0	7–5
6	(Sakha Republic) Universitet Yakutsk	2	1	0	1	6	4	+2	2	0–1	—	6–3
7	(Sakhalin Oblast) Monolit Yuzhno-Sakhalinsk	2	0	0	2	8	13	−5	0	5–7	3–6	—

==== Group 4-A ====
Pos	Team	Pld	W	D	L	GF	GA	GD	Pts	(Novgorod Oblast) ZRN	(Moscow) MKS	(Moscow Oblast) ORR	(Saint Petersburg) MRS
1	(Novgorod Oblast) Zarya Novgorod (H)	3	3	0	0	18	11	+7	6	—	7–5	5–3	6–3
2	Minkassaciya Moscow	3	2	0	1	15	13	+2	4	5–7	—	6–5	4–1
3	(Moscow Oblast) Orly Rossii Lyubertsy	3	1	0	2	14	16	−2	2	3–5	5–6	—	6–5
4	(Saint Petersburg) Mars St. Petersburg	3	0	0	3	9	16	−7	0	3–6	1–4	5–6	—

(H) Hosts

==== Group 4-B ====
Pos	Team	Pld	W	D	L	GF	GA	GD	Pts	(Moscow) DIN	(Komi Republic) SMN	(Saint Petersburg) GLX	(Moscow Oblast) KVN
1	(Moscow) Dina Moskva	3	3	0	0	25	4	+21	6	—	7–3	10–1	8–0
2	(Komi Republic) Smena Vorkuta	3	2	0	1	12	12	0	4	3–7	—	7–4	2–1
3	(Saint Petersburg) Galax St. Petersburg	3	1	0	2	10	18	−8	2	1–10	4–7	—	5–1
4	(Moscow Oblast) Kvark Nefto Protvino	3	0	0	3	2	15	−13	0	0–8	1–2	1–5	—

==== Group 4-Final ====
Pos	Team	Pld	W	D	L	GF	GA	GD	Pts	(Moscow) DIN	(Novgorod Oblast) ZRN	(Moscow) MKS	(Komi Republic) SMN
1	(Moscow) Dina Moskva (A)	3	3	0	0	23	9	+14	6	—	9–5	7–1	7–3
2	(Novgorod Oblast) Zarya Novgorod (A)	3	2	0	1	17	16	+1	4	5–9	—	7–5	5–2
3	Minkassaciya Moscow	3	1	0	2	15	17	−2	2	1–7	5–7	—	9–3
4	(Komi Republic) Smena Vorkuta	3	0	0	3	8	21	−13	0	3–7	2–5	3–9	—

(A) Advance to a further round

Pos	Team	Pld	W	D	L	GF	GA	GD	Pts	(Saint Petersburg) GLX	(Moscow Oblast) KVN	(Moscow Oblast) ORR	(Saint Petersburg) MRS
5	(Saint Petersburg) Galax St. Petersburg	3	2	1	0	19	10	+9	5	—	5–1	9–4	5–5
6	(Moscow Oblast) Kvark Nefto Protvino	3	2	0	1	10	10	0	4	1–5	—	3–2	6–3
7	(Moscow Oblast) Orly Rossii Lyubertsy	3	1	0	2	12	17	−5	2	4–9	2–3	—	6–5
8	(Saint Petersburg) Mars St. Petersburg	3	0	1	2	13	17	−4	1	5–5	3–6	5–6	—

=== Final round ===
==== Group A ====
Pos	Team	Pld	W	D	L	GF	GA	GD	Pts	(Moscow) DIN	(Moscow) TRS	(Moscow) KSM	(Sverdlovsk Oblast) STR
1	(Moscow) Dina Moskva (H)	3	3	0	0	25	8	+17	6	—	10–3	5–1	10–4
2	Trasko Moscow (H)	3	2	0	1	14	18	−4	4	3–10	—	7–5	4–3
3	KSM-24 Moscow (H)	3	1	0	2	20	16	+4	2	1–5	5–7	—	14–4
4	(Sverdlovsk Oblast) Stroitel Verkh-Neyvinsky	3	0	0	3	11	28	−17	0	4–10	3–4	4–14	—

(H) Hosts

==== Group B ====
Pos	Team	Pld	W	D	L	GF	GA	GD	Pts	(Sverdlovsk Oblast) UPI	(Moscow) SPM	(Novgorod Oblast) ZRN	(Chelyabinsk Oblast) FNX
1	(Sverdlovsk Oblast) UPI Yekaterinburg	3	2	1	0	15	12	+3	5	—	4–4	8–6	3–2
2	Spartak Moscow (H)	3	2	1	0	13	8	+5	5	4–4	—	6–2	3–2
3	(Novgorod Oblast) Zarya Novgorod	3	1	0	2	13	16	−3	2	6–8	2–6	—	5–2
4	(Chelyabinsk Oblast) Fenix Chelyabinsk	3	0	0	3	6	11	−5	0	2–3	2–3	2–5	—

(H) Hosts

=== Final four ===
Semi-finals
(Moscow) Dina Moskva	7
Spartak Moscow	1
(Sverdlovsk Oblast) UPI Yekaterinburg	1
Trasko Moscow	6

Final
(Moscow) Dina Moskva	8
Trasko Moscow	3
Third place
Spartak Moscow	1
(Sverdlovsk Oblast) UPI Yekaterinburg	2

== Top League Cup ==
=== Quarterfinals ===
Quarterfinals
1	(Moscow) Dina Moskva	12	7	12
8	(Novgorod Oblast) Zarya Novgorod	6	2	6
2	Dina-MAB Moscow	5	5	4	8
7	(Sverdlovsk Oblast) Stroitel Verkh-Neyvinsky	3	7	2	3
3	(Chelyabinsk Oblast) Fenix Chelyabinsk	4	5	9	8
6	(Sverdlovsk Oblast) UPI Yekaterinburg	5	2	3	6
4	KSM-24 Moscow	+	+	+
5	Spartak Moscow	-	-	-

=== Semifinal ===
Pos	Team	Pld	W	D	L	GF	GA	GD	Pts	(Moscow) DIN	(Moscow) KSM	(Moscow) MAB	(Chelyabinsk Oblast) FNX
1	(Moscow) Dina Moskva (A)	3	2	0	1	21	10	+11	4	—	2–4	11–3	8–3
2	KSM-24 Moscow (A)	3	2	0	1	7	8	−1	4	4–2	—	0–4	3–2
3	Dina-MAB Moscow	3	2	0	1	9	11	−2	4	3–11	4–0	—	2–0
4	(Chelyabinsk Oblast) Fenix Chelyabinsk	3	0	0	3	5	13	−8	0	3–8	2–3	0–2	—

(A) Advance to a further round

=== Finals ===
Final
(Moscow) Dina Moskva (C)	3
KSM-24 Moscow	1

3rd Place
(Chelyabinsk Oblast) Fenix Chelyabinsk	2
Dina-MAB Moscow	0

== First League ==
=== Final stage ===
Pos	Team	Pld	W	D	L	GF	GA	GD	Pts	(Moscow) MKS	(Moscow) SRG	(Saint Petersburg) GLX	(Rostov Oblast) RSM
1	Minkas Moscow (P)	3	2	0	1	19	10	+9	4	—	3–6	7–2	9–2
2	Sargon Moscow (P)	3	1	2	0	12	9	+3	4	6–3	—	3–3	3–3
3	(Saint Petersburg) Galax St. Petersburg (P)	3	0	2	1	7	12	−5	2	2–7	3–3	—	2–2
4	(Rostov Oblast) Rostselmash Rostov-on-Don	3	0	2	1	7	14	−7	2	2–9	3–3	2–2	—

(P) Promoted

=== First stage ===
==== First group ====
Minkas Moscow
MKZ Torpedo Moscow
Minkas Moscow
Novorus Moscow
Sargon Moscow
(Sakha Republic) Universitet Yakutsk
(Sakha Republic) Kristall Neryungri

==== Second group ====
(Moscow Oblast) Orly Rossii Lyubertsy
(Moscow Oblast) ASKO Shchyolkovo
(Moscow Oblast) Kvark Nefto Protvino
Galax Saint Petersburg
Mars Saint Petersburg
(Sakhalin Oblast) Monolit Yuzhno-Sakhalinsk
(Novgorod Oblast) Zarya-2 Novgorog

==== Third group ====
(Nizhny Novgorod Oblast) Soyuz Nizhny Novgorod
(Tatarstan) Рerspektiva SKIF Naberezhnye Chelny
(Tatarstan) Tan Ehdikon Kazan
(Tatarstan) Kosmos Kazan
(Khanty-Mansi Autonomous Okrug) Avtomobilist Kogalym
(Chelyabinsk Oblast) Fenix-2 Chelyabinsk
(Rostov Oblast) Rostselmash Rostov-on-Don

==== Fourth group ====
(Khanty-Mansi Autonomous Okrug) Neftyanik Pokachi
(Sverdlovsk Oblast) UPI-2 Yekaterinburg
(Sverdlovsk Oblast) Metallurg Serov
(Sverdlovsk Oblast) Tornado Yekaterinburg
(Sverdlovsk Oblast) Iskra Kamensk-Uralsky
(Krasnoyarsk Krai) Torpedo Sosnovoborsk
(Sverdlovsk Oblast) VIZ Yekaterinburg
(Sverdlovsk Oblast) Luch Yekaterinburg
(Sverdlovsk Oblast) Severnye Yastreby Nizhnyaya Tura

== Women's League ==
1st Russian women futsal championship 1992/1993

=== Preliminary round ===
==== Third group ====
1. (Sverdlovsk Oblast) Malahit Yekaterinburg (Qualification to 5-8 places tournament)

=== Final round ===
==== 1-4th places ====
Pos	Team	Pld	W	D	L	GF	GA	GD	Pts	(Saint Petersburg) BAL	(Voronezh Oblast) TAN	(Moscow Oblast) GLO	(Moscow) SIU
1	(Saint Petersburg) Baltika St. Petersburg (C)	3	2	1	0	12	5	+7	5	—	3–1	5–0	4–4
2	(Voronezh Oblast) Tanais Voronezh	3	2	0	1	0	0	0	4	1–3	—	5–3	
3	(Moscow Oblast) Gloria Khimki	3	1	0	2	5	11	−6	2	0–5	3–5	—	2–1
4	Siurpriz Moscow	3	0	1	2	0	0	0	1	4–4		1–2	—

(C) Champions

==== 5-8th places ====
Pos	Team	Pld	W	D	L	GF	GA	GD	Pts	(Vladimir Oblast) VLA	(Moscow) TOR	(Sverdlovsk Oblast) MAL	(Moscow Oblast) ORL
5	(Vladimir Oblast) Team of Vladimir	3	2	1	0	19	5	+14	5	—	2–2	9–2	8–1
6	Torpedo Moscow	3	2	1	0	14	4	+10	5	2–2	—	2–0	10–2
7	(Sverdlovsk Oblast) Malahit Yekaterinburg	3	1	0	2	4	12	−8	2	2–9	0–2	—	2–1
8	(Moscow Oblast) Orlenok Krasnoarmeysk	3	0	0	3	4	20	−16	0	1–8	2–10	1–2	—
