= 2004 UEFS Futsal Men's Championship =

VI. European Men's Championship Eurofutsal 2004

Tournament details
- Host country: Belarus
- Dates: 24 – 28 November
- Teams: 8 (from 1 confederation)
- Venue: 1 (in 1 host city)

Final positions
- Champions: Belarus (1st title)
- Runners-up: Czech Republic
- Third place: Russia
- Fourth place: Ukraine

Tournament statistics
- Matches played: 18
- Goals scored: 140 (7.78 per match)

The 2004 UEFS Futsal Men's Championship was the sixth UEFS futsal European championship held in Baranovichi (Belarus), with 8 national teams.

European Union of Futsal (UEFS) organizes the European Championship biennially.

== Teams ==
Group A
Belarus
Belgium
Czech Republic
Norway

Group B
Armenia
Catalonia
Russia
Ukraine

== First round ==
=== Group A ===
Team	Pts	P	W	D	L	+	-	DG
Belarus	9	3	3	0	0	11	1	+10
Czech Republic	3	3	1	0	2	11	11	=
Belgium	3	3	1	0	2	9	12	-3
Norway	3	3	1	0	2	7	14	-7

24 November 2004
24 November 2004	Czech Republic	4-6	Belgium	Atlant Stadium

24 November 2004
24 November 2004	Norway	0-5	Belarus	Atlant Stadium

25 November 2004
25 November 2004	Belgium	3-4	Norway	Atlant Stadium

25 November 2004
25 November 2004	Belarus	2-1	Czech Republic	Atlant Stadium

26 November 2004
26 November 2004	Czech Republic	6-3	Norway	Atlant Stadium

26 November 2004
26 November 2004	Belarus	4-0	Belgium	Atlant Stadium

=== Group B ===
Team	Pts	P	W	D	L	+	-	DG
Russia	6	3	2	0	1	19	7	+12
Ukraine	6	3	2	0	1	18	9	+9
Armenia	3	3	1	0	2	9	29	-20
Catalonia	3	3	1	0	2	13	14	-1

24 November 2004
24 November 2004	Russia	4-3	Ukraine	Atlant Stadium

24 November 2004
24 November 2004	Armenia	7-6	Catalonia	Atlant Stadium

25 November 2004
25 November 2004	Russia	13-1	Armenia	Atlant Stadium

25 November 2004
25 November 2004	Ukraine	5-4	Catalonia	Atlant Stadium

26 November 2004
26 November 2004	Armenia	1-10	Ukraine	Atlant Stadium

26 November 2004
26 November 2004	Russia	2-3	Catalonia	Atlant Stadium

== Final round ==
Semi-finals
27 November - Atlant Stadium
Belarus	5
Ukraine	1
27 November - Atlant Stadium
Russia	5 (1)
Czech Republic	5* (3)

Final
28 November - Atlant Stadium
Belarus	4
Czech Republic	0
Third place
28 November - Atlant Stadium
Russia	12
Ukraine	3

7-8 places

27 November 2004
27 November 2004	Catalonia	3-3	Norway	Atlant Stadium
27 November 2004		(3-2 P)		Atlant Stadium

5-6 places

27 November 2004
27 November 2004	Belgium	2-0	Armenia	Atlant Stadium

Semifinals

27 November 2004
27 November 2004	Belarus	5-1	Ukraine	Atlant Stadium

27 November 2004
27 November 2004	Russia	5-5	Czech Republic	Atlant Stadium
27 November 2004		(1-3 P)		Atlant Stadium

3-4 places

28 November 2004
28 November 2004	Ukraine	3-12	Russia	Atlant Stadium

Final

28 November 2004
28 November 2004	Belarus	4-0	Czech Republic	Atlant Stadium

== Final standings ==
Final standings
	Belarus
	Czech Republic
	Russia
4.	Ukraine
5.	Belgium
6.	Armenia
7.	Catalonia
8.	Norway

== See also ==
- UEFS Futsal Men's Championship
- European Union of Futsal
