= Junín =

Junín may refer to:

== Places ==
=== Argentina ===
- Junín Partido
  - Junín, Buenos Aires
    - Junín Airport
- Junín Department, Mendoza
  - Junín, Mendoza
- Junín Department, San Luis
- Junín de los Andes, Neuquén

=== Colombia ===
- Junín, Cundinamarca
- Junín, Nariño

=== Ecuador ===
- Junín Canton, in Manabí Province

=== Peru ===
- Department of Junín
  - Junín Province
    - Junín, Peru
    - Junín District
    - Lake Junin, also known as Chinchayqucha
    - Junín National Reserve

=== Venezuela ===
- Junín Municipality, Táchira

== See also ==
- Battle of Junín, during the Peruvian War of Independence in 1824
