= 2014 UEFS Futsal Men's Championship =

2014 UEFS Futsal European Men's Championship
XI. European Men's Championship

Tournament details
- Host country: Czech Republic
- Dates: 19 – 23 May
- Teams: 9 (from 1 confederation)
- Venue(s): 1 (in 2 host cities)

Final positions
- Champions: Belarus (2nd title)
- Runners-up: Belgium
- Third place: Catalonia
- Fourth place: Russia

Tournament statistics
- Matches played: 21
- Goals scored: 117 (5.57 per match)

The 2014 UEFS Futsal Men's Championship was the 11th UEFS futsal European championship held in the Czech Republic from 19 May to 23 May, with 9 national teams.

European Union of Futsal (UEFS) organizes the European Championship biennially.

== First round ==
=== Group A ===
| # | Team | G | W | WP | LP | L | Goals | ± | Pts |
|---|---|---|---|---|---|---|---|---|---|
| 1 | Czech Republic | 2 | 2 | 0 | 0 | 0 | 12 − 5 | +7 | 6 |
| 2 | Norway | 2 | 1 | 0 | 0 | 1 | 6 − 9 | -3 | 3 |
| 3 | Israel | 2 | 0 | 0 | 0 | 2 | 4 − 8 | -4 | 0 |

| | (Czech Republic) | (Norway) | (Israel) |
|---|---|---|---|
| Czech Republic | — | 7:3 | 5:2 |
| Norway | 3:7 | — | 3:2 |
| Israel | 2:5 | 2:3 | — |

=== Group B ===
| # | Team | G | W | WP | LP | L | Goals | ± | Pts |
|---|---|---|---|---|---|---|---|---|---|
| 1 | Russia | 2 | 2 | 0 | 0 | 0 | 12 − 4 | +8 | 6 |
| 2 | Catalonia | 2 | 1 | 0 | 0 | 1 | 4 − 5 | -1 | 3 |
| 3 | (Basque Country (autonomous community)) Basque Country | 2 | 0 | 0 | 0 | 2 | 5 − 12 | -7 | 0 |

| | (Russia) | (Catalonia) | (Basque Country (autonomous community)) |
|---|---|---|---|
| Russia | — | 3:1 | 9:3 |
| Catalonia | 1:3 | — | 3:2 |
| Basque Country | 3:9 | 2:3 | — |

=== Group С ===
| # | Team | G | W | WP | LP | L | Goals | ± | Pts |
|---|---|---|---|---|---|---|---|---|---|
| 1 | Belarus | 2 | 0 | 2 | 0 | 0 | 3 − 3 | = | 4 |
| 2 | Slovakia | 2 | 1 | 0 | 1 | 0 | 4 − 3 | +1 | 4 |
| 3 | Belgium | 2 | 0 | 0 | 1 | 1 | 3 − 4 | -1 | 1 |

| | (Belarus) | (Slovakia) | (Belgium) |
|---|---|---|---|
| Belarus | — | 2^{2}:2^{1} | 1^{2}:1^{0} |
| Slovakia | 2^{1}:2^{2} | — | 2:1 |
| Belgium | 1^{0}:1^{2} | 1:2 | — |

== Final round ==
Quarter-finals
22 May
Russia | 9
Israel | 1
22 May
(Czech Republic) Czech Repuplic | 0
Belgium | 5
22 May
Belarus (aet) | 4
Norway | 2
22 May
Catalonia (aet) | 3
Slovakia | 2

Semi-finals
23 May
Russia | 2
Belgium (aet) | 4
23 May
Belarus | 2
Catalonia | 0

Final
24 May
Belgium | 1
Belarus | 2
Third place
24 May
Russia | 1
Catalonia | 2

=== 5th-8th place ===
Semi-finals
23 May
(Czech Republic) Czech Repuplic | 9
Israel | 0
23 May
Slovakia | 4
Norway | 3

Final
24 May
(Czech Republic) Czech Repuplic | 0 (1)
Slovakia | 0* (2)
Third place
24 May
Israel | 3
Norway | 2

== Final ranking ==
| Gold medal | Belarus |
| Silver medal | Belgium |
| Bronze medal | Catalonia |
| 4 | Russia |
| 5 | Slovakia |
| 6 | Czech Republic |
| 7 | Israel |
| 8 | Norway |
| 9 | (Basque Country (autonomous community)) Basque Country |
