= Liliu (futsal player) =

Brazilian-born Belgian futsal player

Personal information
- Full name: Wilson Pires de Carvalho
- Date of birth: 16 April 1979 (age 47)
- Place of birth: Joaçaba, Brazil
- Position: Winger

Team information
- Current team: Châtelineau

International career
Years	Team	Apps	(Gls)
- Belgium

Wilson Pires de Carvalho, a.k.a. Liliu (born 16 April 1979), is a Brazilian-born Belgian futsal player who plays for Châtelineau and the Belgian national futsal team.
