= 1982 FIFUSA Futsal World Cup =

1982 I FIFUSA Futsal World Championship
Tournament details
- Host country: Brazil
- Dates: 30 May – 6 June
- Teams: 10 (from 4 confederations)
- Venue: 1 (in 1 host city)

Final positions
- Champions: Brazil (1st title)
- Runners-up: Paraguay
- Third place: Uruguay
- Fourth place: Colombia

Tournament statistics
- Matches played: 24
- Goals scored: 132 (5.5 per match)
- Top scorer: (Paraguay) Ramón Carossini (11 goals)
- Best player: (Brazil) Jackson
- Fair play award: Czechoslovakia

The 1982 FIFUSA Futsal World Championship was the inaugural FIFUSA Futsal World Cup (now known as AMF Futsal World Cup). The tournament was held by Brazil from 30 May to 6 June in São Paulo. Ten national teams from four confederations (five from South America, three from Europe, one from Asia and one from North America) participated in the tournament.

== Venues ==
All matches were played in one venue: Ginásio do Ibirapuera in São Paulo.

São Paulo
Ginásio do Ibirapuera
Capacity: 11,000
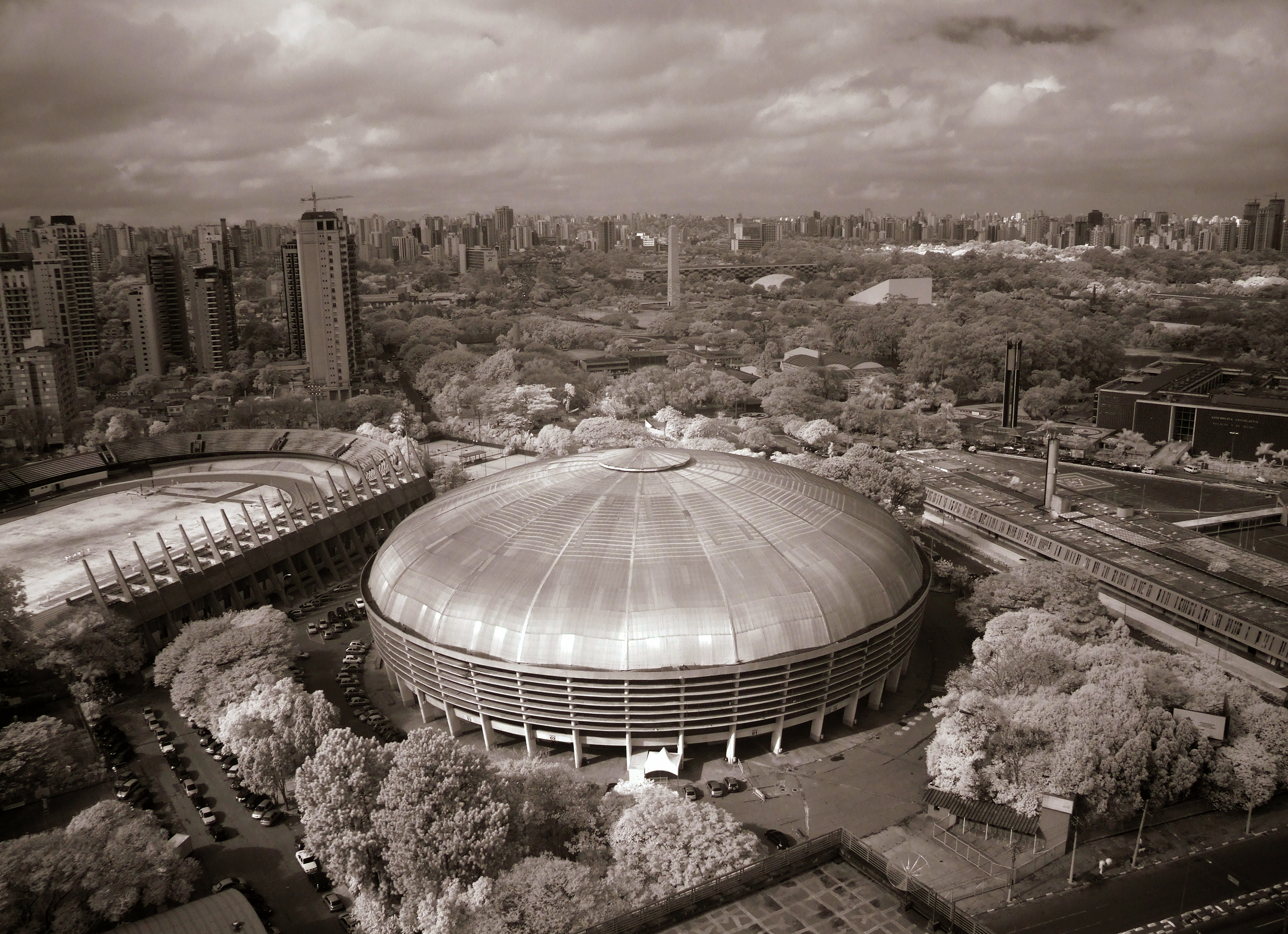

== Teams ==
- Argentina
- Brazil (host nation)
- Colombia
- Costa Rica
- Czechoslovakia
- Italy
- Japan
- Netherlands
- Paraguay
- Uruguay

== First round ==
The group winners and runners up advanced to the round of 16.

=== Group A ===
Team	Pld	W	D	L	GF	GA	GD	Pts
Brazil	4	4	0	0	28	2	+26	12
Uruguay	4	3	0	1	16	6	+10	9
Czechoslovakia	4	1	1	2	9	9	0	4
Argentina	4	1	1	2	7	14	−7	4
Costa Rica	4	0	0	4	5	35	−30	0

30 May

Brazil	5–0	Argentina

Ginásio do Ibirapuera
31 May

Uruguay	2–0	Czechoslovakia

Ginásio do Ibirapuera
31 May

Brazil	14–0	Costa Rica

Ginásio do Ibirapuera
1 June

Brazil	4–1	Czechoslovakia

Ginásio do Ibirapuera
1 June

Uruguay	8–1	Costa Rica

Ginásio do Ibirapuera
2 June

Argentina	1–1	Czechoslovakia

Ginásio do Ibirapuera
3 June

Argentina	6–3	Costa Rica

Ginásio do Ibirapuera
3 June

Brazil	5–1	Uruguay

Ginásio do Ibirapuera
4 June

Czechoslovakia	7–1	Costa Rica

Ginásio do Ibirapuera
4 June

Uruguay	5–0	Argentina

Ginásio do Ibirapuera

=== Group B ===
Team	Pld	W	D	L	GF	GA	GD	Pts
Paraguay	4	4	0	0	27	5	+22	12
Colombia	4	2	0	2	13	7	+6	6
Netherlands	4	2	0	2	8	14	−6	6
Italy	4	1	0	3	7	11	−4	3
Japan	4	1	0	3	4	22	−18	3

30 May

Japan	2–0	Italy

Ginásio do Ibirapuera
31 May

Colombia	5–0	Japan

Ginásio do Ibirapuera
31 May

Paraguay	5–3	Italy

Ginásio do Ibirapuera
1 June

Netherlands	3–2	Japan

Ginásio do Ibirapuera
1 June

Italy	3–2	Colombia

Ginásio do Ibirapuera
2 June

Paraguay	6–1	Netherlands

Ginásio do Ibirapuera
3 June

Colombia	5–2	Netherlands

Ginásio do Ibirapuera
3 June

Paraguay	14–0	Japan

Ginásio do Ibirapuera
4 June

Paraguay	2–1	Colombia

Ginásio do Ibirapuera
4 June

Netherlands	2–1	Italy

Ginásio do Ibirapuera

== Knockout phase ==
In the knockout stages, if a match is level at the end of normal playing time, extra time shall be played (two periods of five minutes each) and followed, if necessary, by kicks from the penalty mark to determine the winner.

=== Classification 1st–4th ===
Semifinals
5 June
Brazil	4
Colombia	1
5 June
Paraguay	2
Uruguay	0

Final
6 June
Brazil	1
Paraguay	0
3rd place
6 June
Uruguay	0 (2)
Colombia	0 (1)

=== Semifinals ===
5 June

Brazil	4–1	Colombia

Ginásio do Ibirapuera

5 June

Paraguay	2–0	Uruguay

Ginásio do Ibirapuera

=== Third place match ===
6 June

Uruguay	0–0	Colombia
Penalties
	2–1

Ginásio do Ibirapuera

=== Final ===
6 June

Brazil	1–0	Paraguay
Jackson 7' (2nd time)

Ginásio do Ibirapuera
Referee: Hermes Mancilla (Colombia)

== Ranking ==
Note: As per statistical convention in football, matches decided in extra time are counted as wins and losses, while matches decided by penalty shoot-outs are counted as draws.

Pos.	Team	Pld	W	D	L	Pts	GF	GA	GD
1	Brazil	6	6	0	0	18	33	3	+30
2	Paraguay	6	5	0	1	15	29	6	+23
3	Uruguay	6	3	1	2	10	16	8	+8
4	Colombia	6	2	1	3	7	14	11	+3
Eliminated in the group stage
5	Netherlands	4	2	0	2	6	8	14	−6
6	Czechoslovakia	4	1	1	2	4	9	9	0
7	Argentina	4	1	1	2	4	7	14	−7
8	Italy	4	1	0	3	3	7	11	−4
9	Japan	4	1	0	3	3	4	22	−18
10	Costa Rica	4	0	0	4	0	5	35	−30
