= Junín, Nariño =

Junín
- Populated center
- Location in Nariño and Colombia Junín (Colombia)
- Coordinates: 1°19′59.1312″N 78°8′59.1036″W
- Country: Colombia
- Department: Nariño
- Municipality: Barbacoas Municipality
- Elevation: 3,796 ft (1,157 m)

Population (2005)
  - Total: 44
- Time zone: UTC-5 (Colombia Standard Time)

Junín is a populated center of Colombia in Barbacoas Municipality, Nariño Department in Colombia.

== Climate ==
Junín has a relatively cool due to elevation and extremely wet tropical rainforest climate (Af). It is the wettest place in the department of Nariño.

Climate data for Junín
Month	Jan	Feb	Mar	Apr	May	Jun	Jul	Aug	Sep	Oct	Nov	Dec	Year
Mean daily maximum °C (°F)	24.6 (76.3)	25.0 (77.0)	25.4 (77.7)	25.5 (77.9)	25.4 (77.7)	25.5 (77.9)	25.4 (77.7)	25.4 (77.7)	25.3 (77.5)	24.8 (76.6)	24.6 (76.3)	24.4 (75.9)	25.1 (77.2)
Daily mean °C (°F)	20.5 (68.9)	20.8 (69.4)	21.1 (70.0)	21.1 (70.0)	21.1 (70.0)	21.0 (69.8)	20.7 (69.3)	20.8 (69.4)	20.7 (69.3)	20.6 (69.1)	20.4 (68.7)	20.4 (68.7)	20.8 (69.4)
Mean daily minimum °C (°F)	16.5 (61.7)	16.7 (62.1)	16.8 (62.2)	16.8 (62.2)	16.8 (62.2)	16.5 (61.7)	16.1 (61.0)	16.2 (61.2)	16.2 (61.2)	16.4 (61.5)	16.4 (61.5)	16.5 (61.7)	16.5 (61.7)
Average rainfall mm (inches)	811.5 (31.95)	660.9 (26.02)	779.5 (30.69)	945.0 (37.20)	896.8 (35.31)	720.0 (28.35)	561.7 (22.11)	448.9 (17.67)	614.1 (24.18)	846.2 (33.31)	686.7 (27.04)	839.7 (33.06)	8,811 (346.89)
Average rainy days	30.1	26.7	29.5	29.3	30.0	28.7	29.6	27.7	29.1	30.2	28.3	30.0	349.2
Source 1:
Source 2:
