= Andrés Murillo =

Colombian footballer (born 1996)

Personal information
- Full name: Andrés Felipe Murillo Segura
- Date of birth: 1 April 1996 (age 30)
- Place of birth: Zarzal, Colombia
- Height: 1.83 m (6 ft 0 in)
- Position: Defender

Youth career
- –2014: La Equidad
- 2016: → Santos Laguna (loan)

Senior career*
Years	Team	Apps	(Gls)
2014–2017	La Equidad	43	(2)
2016	→ Santos Laguna (loan)	0	(0)
2019–2020	La Equidad	40	(1)
2021–2023	Millonarios	47	(0)
2024	Deportivo Táchira	0	(0)
2024	Marathón	2	(0)
- * Club domestic league appearances and goals as of 30 November 2024

Andrés Felipe Murillo Segura (born 1 April 1996) is a Colombian professional footballer who plays as a defender.

== Honours ==
Millonarios

- Copa Colombia: 2022
- Categoría Primera A: 2023–I
