= Junín, Mendoza =

Junín
- Town
- Location of Junín in Argentina
- Coordinates: 33°08′S 68°28′W
- Country: Argentina
- Province: Mendoza
- Department: Junín
- Elevation: 657 m (2,156 ft)

Population
  - Total: 6,084
- Demonym: juninense
- Time zone: UTC−3 (ART)
- CPA base: M5573
- Dialing code: +54 2623
- Climate: BWk

Junín is a town in Mendoza Province, Argentina. It is the head town of Junín Department.

The town was founded on January 18, 1859.
