= Junín Department, Mendoza =

Junín Departamento Junín
- Department
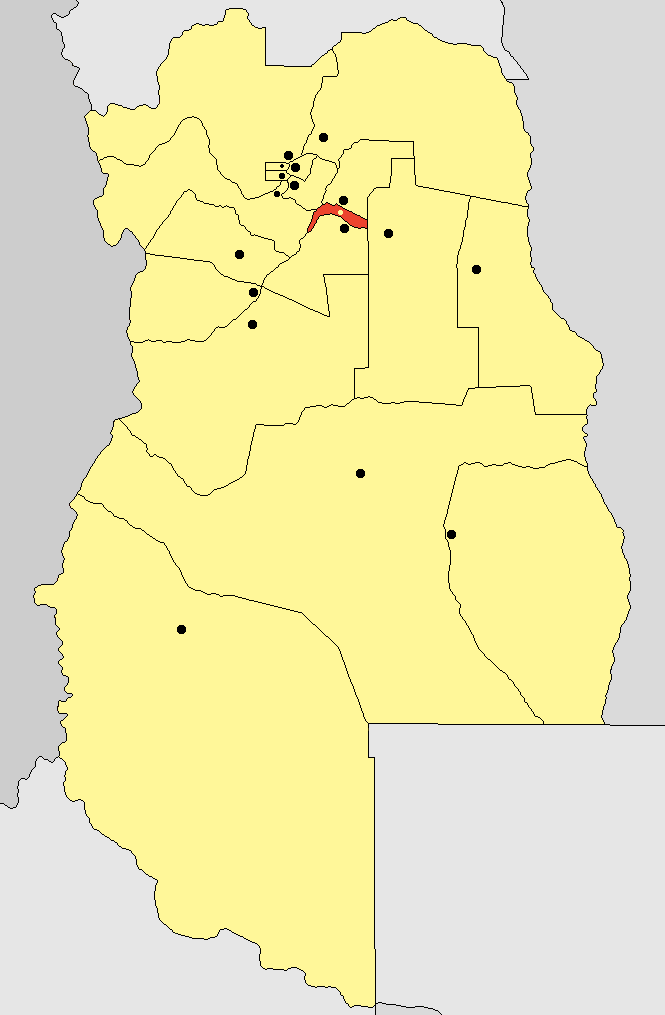
- location of Junín Department in Mendoza Province
- Coordinates: 33°15′S 68°43′W
- Country: Argentina
- Established: January 18, 1859
- Seat: Junín

Government
  - Intendant: Mario Abed, UCR

Area
  - Total: 263 km^{2} (102 sq mi)

Population (2022 census [INDEC])
  - Total: 46,604
  - Density: 177/km^{2} (459/sq mi)
- Demonym: junínense
- Postal Code: M5585
- IFAM: MZA004
- Area Code: 02623
- Patron saint: Our Lady of the Rosary
- Website: www.juninmendoza.gov.ar

Junín is a central department of Mendoza Province in Argentina.

The provincial subdivision has a population of about 35,000 inhabitants in an area of 263 km^{2} (102 sq mi), and its capital city is Junín, which is located around 1,080 km (670 mi) from the Capital Federal.

== Districts ==
- Algarrobo Grande
- Alto Verde
- Junín
- La Colonia
- Los Barriales
- Medrano
- Mundo Nuevo
- Phillips
- Rodríguez Peña
