= 2007 AMF Futsal Men's World Cup =

IX AMF Futsal World Championship
Tournament details
- Host country: Argentina
- Dates: 31 August–9 September
- Teams: 16 (from 3 confederations)
- Venue: 6 (in 6 Mendoza host cities)

Final positions
- Champions: Paraguay (3rd title)
- Runners-up: Argentina
- Third place: Colombia
- Fourth place: Peru

Tournament statistics
- Matches played: 32
- Goals scored: 292 (9.13 per match)

The 2007 AMF Futsal Men's World Cup was the 9th edition of the AMF Futsal World Cup. It was held in several cities in the province of Mendoza (Argentina), from August 31 to September 9. It was organized by the Confederación Argentina de Fútbol de Salón (CAFS) and the Asociación Mundial de Futsal (AMF) with the participation of 16 national teams. Paraguay was once again proclaimed as AMF Futsal World Champions when they defeated the host team, Argentina, in the final by a score of 1–0.

The matches were played in Las Heras, Luján de Cuyo, Maipú, Junín, Godoy Cruz and San Rafael.

== Teams ==
Pool A
Argentina
Uruguay
Belgium
Norway

Pool B
Paraguay
Catalonia
Ecuador
Chile

Pool C
Colombia
Czech Republic
Venezuela
Canada

Pool D
Bolivia
Russia
Peru
Costa Rica

== Pools round ==
POOL A	Pts	P	W	D	L	GF	GA	DG
Argentina	9	3	3	0	0	15	6	+9
Belgium	6	3	2	0	1	10	9	+1
Uruguay	3	3	1	0	2	11	14	−3
Norway	0	3	0	0	3	9	16	−7

September 1, 2007; 15:00
September 1, 2007; 15:00	Argentina	6–2	Norway	Polideportivo Andes Talleres; Godoy Cruz
September 1, 2007; 15:00	Femenía (1'); Chávez (10') ( ) Banegas (15'); Nuñez; Mescolatti		Roberto Rojas (28'); Ivan Olivares (29')	Polideportivo Andes Talleres; Godoy Cruz

September 1, 2007; 18:00
September 1, 2007; 18:00	Belgium	4–3	Uruguay	Polideportivo Vicente Polimeni; Las Heras

September 2, 2007; 15:00
September 2, 2007; 15:00	Argentina	7–3	Uruguay	Polideportivo Andes Talleres; Godoy Cruz

September 2, 2007; 20:00
September 2, 2007; 20:00	Belgium	5–4	Norway	Polideportivo Vicente Polimeni; Las Heras
September 2, 2007; 20:00	El Hafid(2); Hoste; Deleu; Beaudot			Polideportivo Vicente Polimeni; Las Heras

September 3, 2007; 20:00
September 3, 2007; 20:00	Uruguay	5–3	Norway	Polideportivo La Colonia; Junín

September 3, 2007; 21:30
September 3, 2007; 21:30	Argentina	2–1	Belgium	Polideportivo Andes Talleres; Godoy Cruz

POOL B	Pts	P	W	D	L	GF	GA	DG
Paraguay	9	3	3	0	0	41	8	+33
Ecuador	6	3	2	0	1	20	25	−5
Catalonia	1	3	0	1	2	10	18	−8
Chile	1	3	0	1	2	14	34	−20

September 1, 2007; 18:00
September 1, 2007; 18:00	Paraguay	18–1	Chile	Polideportivo Juan D. Ribosqui; Maipú
September 1, 2007; 18:00			P. Layseca(3')	Polideportivo Juan D. Ribosqui; Maipú

September 1, 2007; 20:00
September 1, 2007; 20:00	Catalonia	2–5	Ecuador	Polideportivo Juan D. Ribosqui; Maipú
September 1, 2007; 20:00	Matamoros(3'); Vargas(9')		F. Parrales (1')(28'); L. Parrales(21')(31')(39')	Polideportivo Juan D. Ribosqui; Maipú

September 2, 2007; 18:00
September 2, 2007; 18:00	Paraguay	17–6	Ecuador	Polideportivo Vicente Polimeni; Las Heras

September 2, 2007; 18:00
September 2, 2007; 18:00	Catalonia	7–7	Chile	Polideportivo Juan D. Ribosqui; Maipú
September 2, 2007; 18:00			P. Layseca (3')(7')(15')(22')(39')	Polideportivo Juan D. Ribosqui; Maipú

September 3, 2007; 17:00
September 3, 2007; 17:00	Ecuador	9–6	Chile	Polideportivo Juan D. Ribosqui; Maipú
September 3, 2007; 17:00			P. Layseca (9') (19')	Polideportivo Juan D. Ribosqui; Maipú

September 3, 2007; 17:00
September 3, 2007; 17:00	Paraguay	6–1	Catalonia	Polideportivo Hipólito Irigoyen; Luján de Cuyo
September 3, 2007; 17:00			Nieto	Polideportivo Hipólito Irigoyen; Luján de Cuyo

POOL C	Pts	P	W	D	L	GF	GA	DG
Colombia	9	3	3	0	0	24	5	+19
Czech Republic	6	3	2	0	1	4	12	−8
Canada	3	3	1	0	2	9	13	−4
Venezuela	0	3	0	0	3	9	16	−7

September 1, 2007; 18:00
September 1, 2007; 18:00	Colombia	5–1	Canada	Polideportivo Hipólito Irigoyen; Luján de Cuyo

September 1, 2007; 20:00
September 1, 2007; 20:00	Czech Republic	1–0	Venezuela	Polideportivo La Colonia; Junín
September 1, 2007; 20:00	Goj(5')			Polideportivo La Colonia; Junín

September 2, 2007; 17:00
September 2, 2007; 17:00	Colombia	9–4	Venezuela	Polideportivo Hipólito Irigoyen; Luján de Cuyo

September 2, 2007; 20:00
September 2, 2007; 20:00	Czech Republic	3–2	Canada	Polideportivo Juan D. Ribosqui; Maipú

September 3, 2007; 15:30
September 3, 2007; 15:30	Czech Republic	0–10	Colombia	Polideportivo Andes Talleres; Godoy Cruz

September 3, 2007; 15:30
September 3, 2007; 15:30	Canada	6–5	Venezuela	Polideportivo Juan D. Ribosqui; Maipú

POOL D	Pts	P	W	D	L	GF	GA	DG
Peru	6	3	2	0	1	13	10	+3
Bolivia	6	3	2	0	1	13	11	+2
Russia	3	3	1	0	2	13	15	−2
Costa Rica	3	3	1	0	2	13	16	−3

August 31, 2007; 22:00
August 31, 2007; 22:00	Russia	5–8	Peru	Polideportivo La Colonia; Junín

September 1, 2007; 20:00
September 1, 2007; 20:00	Bolivia	8–6	Costa Rica	Polideportivo Hipólito Irigoyen; Luján de Cuyo

September 2, 2007; 15:00
September 2, 2007; 15:00	Bolivia	1–2	Peru	Polideportivo Hipólito Irigoyen; Luján de Cuyo

September 2, 2007; 20:00
September 2, 2007; 20:00	Russia	5–3	Costa Rica	Polideportivo La Colonia; Junín

September 3, 2007; 15:30
September 3, 2007; 15:30	Peru	3–4	Costa Rica	Polideportivo Vicente Polimeni; Las Heras

September 3, 2007; 15:30
September 3, 2007; 15:30	Bolivia	4–3	Russia	Polideportivo Hipólito Irigoyen; Luján de Cuyo

== Final round ==
Quarter-finals
September 5 – Godoy Cruz
Argentina	10
Ecuador	2
September 5 – Luján de Cuyo
Colombia	4
Bolivia	1
September 5 – Junín
Paraguay	4
Belgium	1
September 5 – Maipú
Peru	7
Czech Republic	5

Semi-finals
September 7 – Godoy Cruz
Argentina	7
Colombia	6
September 7 – Las Heras
Paraguay	4
Peru	2

Final
September 9 – Godoy Cruz
Argentina	0
Paraguay	1
Third place
September 8 – Junín
Colombia	6
Peru	4

Quarter finals

September 5, 2007; 21:30
September 5, 2007; 21:30	Argentina	10–2	Ecuador	Polideportivo Andes Talleres; Godoy Cruz

September 5, 2007; 13:00
September 5, 2007; 13:00	Colombia	4–1	Bolivia	Polideportivo Hipólito Irigoyen; Luján de Cuyo

September 5, 2007; 20:00
September 5, 2007; 20:00	Paraguay	4–1	Belgium	Polideportivo La Colonia; Junín

September 5, 2007; 14:30
September 5, 2007; 14:30	Peru	7–5	Czech Republic	Polideportivo Juan D. Ribosqui; Maipú
September 5, 2007; 14:30			Goj (3); Stojaník; Šnídl	Polideportivo Juan D. Ribosqui; Maipú

Semifinals

September 7, 2007; 21:30
September 7, 2007; 21:30	Argentina	7–6	Colombia	Polideportivo Andes Talleres; Godoy Cruz
September 7, 2007; 21:30	Núñez (2); Figueroa (2); Femenía; Mescolatti; Santofino(pp)		Pinilla(2); Celis(2); Hernández; Parra	Polideportivo Andes Talleres; Godoy Cruz

September 7, 2007; 14:30
September 7, 2007; 14:30	Paraguay	4–2	Peru	Polideportivo Vicente Polimeni; Las Heras
September 7, 2007; 14:30	Zorrilla (2); Santander; Delgado		Hernández; Anaya	Polideportivo Vicente Polimeni; Las Heras

Third place

September 8, 2007; 19:30
September 8, 2007; 19:30	Peru	4–6	Colombia	Polideportivo La Colonia; Junín
September 8, 2007; 19:30	Hernández (2); García; Amaya		Céliz (2); Pinilla (2); Rodríguez; Hernández	Polideportivo La Colonia; Junín

Final

September 9, 2007; 19:00
September 9, 2007; 19:00	Argentina	0–1	Paraguay	Polideportivo Andes Talleres; Godoy Cruz
September 9, 2007; 19:00			Núñez	Polideportivo Andes Talleres; Godoy Cruz

2007 AMF Futsal World Cup winners

Paraguay
Third title

== Final standings ==
Final standings
1	Paraguay
2	Argentina
3	Colombia
4	Peru
5	Czech Republic
6	Belgium
7	Ecuador
8	Bolivia
9	Russia
10	Costa Rica
11	Uruguay
12	Canada
13	Catalonia
14	Chile
15	Norway
15	Venezuela
