= Belarus national futsal team =

Belarus
- Association: Football Federation of Belarus
- Confederation: UEFA (Europe)
- FIFA code: BLR
- FIFA ranking: 30 ▼1 (24 September 2026)
| Home colours | Away colours |

First international
- Belarus 1–2 Ukraine (Minsk, Belarus; 5 June 1994)

Biggest win
- England 2–16 Belarus (Sheffield, England; 30 May 2006); Belarus 14–0 Israel (Minsk, Belarus; 6 April 2021)

Biggest defeat
- Russia 9–0 Belarus (Russia; 28 September 2003); Brazil 9–0 Belarus (Brazil; 8 December 2009)

FIFA World Cup
- Appearances: None

AMF World Cup
- Appearances: 5 (First in 1994)
- Best result: Quarterfinals (1997, 2011, 2015)

UEFA Futsal Championship
- Appearances: 1 (First in 2010)
- Best result: 1st round (2010, 2026)

The Belarus national futsal team is the national futsal team of Belarus and is controlled by the Football Federation of Belarus and represents the country in international futsal competitions, such as the FIFA Futsal World Cup and the European Championships.

== Tournament records ==
=== FIFA Futsal World Cup ===
FIFA Futsal World Cup Record
| Year | Round | Position | Pld | W | D | L | GS | GA |
|---|---|---|---|---|---|---|---|---|
| (Netherlands) 1989 | Part of Soviet Union | | | | | | | |
| (Hong Kong) 1992 | Did not enter | | | | | | | |
| (Spain) 1996 | Did not qualify | | | | | | | |
| (Guatemala) 2000 | Did not qualify | | | | | | | |
| (Chinese Taipei) 2004 | Did not qualify | | | | | | | |
| (Brazil) 2008 | Did not qualify | | | | | | | |
| (Thailand) 2012 | Did not qualify | | | | | | | |
| (Colombia) 2016 | Did not qualify | | | | | | | |
| 2021 | Did not qualify | | | | | | | |
| (Uzbekistan) 2024 | Did not qualify | | | | | | | |
| Total | 0/10 | | 0 | 0 | 0 | 0 | 0 | 0 |

=== UEFA Futsal Championship ===
UEFA Futsal Championship record
| Year | Round | Position | Pld | W | D | L | GS | GA |
|---|---|---|---|---|---|---|---|---|
| (Spain) 1996 | Did not enter | | | | | | | |
| (Spain) 1999 | Did not qualify | | | | | | | |
| (Russia) 2001 | Did not qualify | | | | | | | |
| (Italy) 2003 | Did not qualify | | | | | | | |
| (Czech Republic) 2005 | Did not qualify | | | | | | | |
| (Portugal) 2007 | Did not qualify | | | | | | | |
| (Hungary) 2010 | Group stage | 9th | 2 | 0 | 1 | 1 | 6 | 14 |
| (Croatia) 2012 | Did not qualify | | | | | | | |
| (Belgium) 2014 | Did not qualify | | | | | | | |
| (Serbia) 2016 | Did not qualify | | | | | | | |
| (Slovenia) 2018 | Did not qualify | | | | | | | |
| (Netherlands) 2022 | Did not qualify | | | | | | | |
| (Latvia) (Lithuania) (Slovenia) 2026 | Group stage | 12th | 3 | 1 | 0 | 2 | 3 | 8 |
| Total:2/13 | Group stage | 9th | 5 | 1 | 1 | 3 | 9 | 22 |

== Current squad ==
The following players were named for UEFA Futsal Euro 2026

Head coach: Aleksandr Chernik

| No. | Pos. | Player | Date of birth (age) | Club |
|---|---|---|---|---|
| 12 | GK | Aleksei Luksha | 8 October 1992 (aged 33) | (Football Federation of Belarus) MFC Stalitsa Minsk |
| 16 | GK | Artem Petukhov | 22 June 2000 (aged 25) | (Football Federation of Belarus) BC Gomel |
| 5 | DF | Vladislav Selyuk | 19 November 1993 (aged 32) | (Football Federation of Belarus) VRZ Gomel |
| 17 | DF | Maksim Baturin | 12 September 1993 (aged 32) | (Football Federation of Belarus) Viten Orsha |
| 21 | DF | Igor Shcherbich | 21 December 1992 (aged 33) | (Football Federation of Belarus) MFC Stalitsa Minsk |
| 27 | DF | Pavel Ragovik | 27 January 1991 (aged 34) | (Football Federation of Belarus) Viten Orsha |
| 61 | DF | Artem Kozel | 20 June 1994 (aged 31) | (Football Federation of Belarus) MFC Stalitsa Minsk |
| 7 | FW | Aleksei Pinchuk | 2 November 1991 (aged 34) | (Football Federation of Belarus) VRZ Gomel |
| 11 | FW | Sergei Krykun | 11 July 1991 (aged 34) | (Russian Football Union) MFK KPRF |
| 13 | FW | Andrei Semianiuk | 17 March 1988 (aged 37) | (Football Federation of Belarus) FC Minsk |
| 15 | FW | Dmitri Shimanovski | 4 October 1994 (aged 31) | (Football Federation of Belarus) MFC Stalitsa Minsk |
| 26 | FW | Artem Yakubov | 26 August 1993 (aged 32) | (Football Federation of Belarus) MFC Stalitsa Minsk |
| 80 | FW | Dmitri Shvedko | 26 March 2000 (aged 25) | (Russian Football Union) MFK KPRF |
| 99 | FW | Yuri Dubkov | 30 June 2000 (aged 25) | (Football Federation of Belarus) VRZ Gomel |
