= Czech Republic national futsal team =

Czech Republic
- Nickname(s): Národní tým
- Association: Fotbalová asociace České republiky (FAČR)
- Confederation: UEFA (Europe)
- Head coach: Marek Kopecký
- FIFA code: CZE
- FIFA ranking: 19 (24 September 2026)
Home colours	Away colours

First international
- as Czechoslovakia; Czechoslovakia 2–8 Belgium (Rome, Italy, July 17, 1983) as Czech Republic; Russia 5–7 Czech Republic (Gdańsk, Poland; October 23, 1992)

Biggest win
- as Czechoslovakia; Czechoslovakia 2–0 Belgium (Jesi, Italy, November 10, 1991) as Czech Republic; Latvia 0–13 Czech Republic (Gdańsk, Poland; October 25, 1992); Czech Republic 16–3 Greenland (Prague, Czech Republic; January 16, 2016)

Biggest defeat
- as Czechoslovakia; Czechoslovakia 2–8 Belgium (Rome, Italy, July 17, 1983) as Czech Republic; Brazil 7–0 Czech Republic (Goiânia, Brazil; June 30, 2009); Czech Republic 1–8 Spain; Debrecen, Hungary; January 28, 2010); Brazil 9–2 Czech Republic (Anápolis, Brazil; October 17, 2010); Czech Republic 1–8 Spain (Antwerp, Belgium; February 2, 2014); Czech Republic 0–7 Italy (Belgrade, Serbia; February 7, 2016); Romania 7–0 Czech Republic (Deva, Romania; December 7, 2016)

FIFA World Cup
- Appearances: 4 (First in 2004)
- Best result: Round of 16 (2012, 2021)

AMF World Cup
- Appearances: 10 (First in 1982)
- Best result: Quarterfinals (2007, 2015)

European Championship
- Appearances: 8 (First in 2001)
- Best result: (bronze) 3rd place (2003, 2010)

Confederations Cup
- Appearances: 1 (First in 2014)
- Best result: 2nd place (2014)

Grand Prix de Futsal
- Appearances: 6 (First in 2006)
- Best result: (silver) 2nd place (2018)

The Czech Republic national futsal team recognised by FIFA as Czechia, is the national futsal team of the Czech Republic and represents the country in international futsal competitions, such as the FIFA Futsal World Cup and the European Championships. The team is controlled by the Football Association of the Czech Republic, which is affiliated with UEFA.

== Results and fixtures ==
The following is a list of match results in the last 12 months, as well as any future matches that have been scheduled.

Legend

Win Draw Lose Fixture

== Players ==
=== Current squad ===
The following players were called up to the squad for the UEFA 2024 FIFA Futsal World Cup qualification matches against Italy on 6 and 11 October 2023.

No.	Pos.	Player	Date of birth (age)	Caps	Goals	Club
1	GK	Lukáš Němec	22 February 1998 (age 28)	15	0	(Football Association of the Czech Republic) SK Interobal Plzeň
2	GK	Ondřej Vahala	25 May 1990 (age 36)	79	4	(Football Association of the Czech Republic) SK Interobal Plzeň
6	DF	Jan Homola	17 February 1994 (age 32)	14	1	(Football Association of the Czech Republic) SK Slavia Praha
8	DF	Matěj Slováček	8 October 1990 (age 36)	97	21	(Football Association of the Czech Republic) FK Chrudim
9	DF	Tomáš Koudelka	17 December 1990 (age 35)	92	17	(Football Association of the Czech Republic) FK Chrudim
12	DF	Lukáš Křivánek	23 June 1997 (age 29)	27	2	(Football Association of the Czech Republic) SK Interobal Plzeň
13	DF	Michal Holý	29 May 1990 (age 36)	108	31	(Football Association of the Czech Republic) SK Interobal Plzeň
4	FW	Radim Záruba	28 December 1994 (age 31)	97	38	(Football Association of the Czech Republic) FK Chrudim
5	FW	Pavel Drozd	12 September 1995 (age 31)	60	26	(Football Association of the Czech Republic) FK Chrudim
7	FW	Lukáš Rešetár (captain)	28 April 1984 (age 42)	157	88	(Football Association of the Czech Republic) SK Interobal Plzeň
10	FW	Michal Seidler	5 April 1990 (age 36)	145	114	(Polish Football Association) Rekord Bielsko-Biała
11	FW	David Drozd	12 September 1995 (age 31)	78	22	(Football Association of the Czech Republic) FK Chrudim
14	FW	Tomáš Vnuk	1 December 1993 (age 32)	66	17	(Football Association of the Czech Republic) SK Interobal Plzeň
18	FW	Adam Knobloch	29 September 2002 (age 24)	6	1	(Football Association of the Czech Republic) SK Interobal Plzeň

=== Recent call-ups ===
The following players have also been called up to the squad within the last 12 months.

Pos.	Player	Date of birth (age)	Caps	Goals	Club	Latest call-up
^{COV} Player withdrew from the squad due to contracting COVID-19.^{INJ} Player withdrew from the squad due to an injury.^{PRE} Preliminary squad.^{RET} Retired from international futsal.

== Competitive record ==
=== FIFA Futsal World Cup ===
FIFA Futsal World Cup record
Year	Round	Pld	W	D	L	GS	GA
Netherlands 1989	Did not qualify						
Hong Kong 1992	Did not qualify						
Spain 1996	Did not qualify						
Guatemala 2000	Did not qualify						
(Chinese Taipei) Taiwan 2004	2nd round (as Round 8)	6	2	0	4	12	18
Brazil 2008	1st round	4	2	0	2	10	10
Thailand 2012	Round of 16	4	1	1	2	7	14
Colombia 2016	Did not qualify						
Lithuania 2021	Round of 16	4	1	1	2	8	11
Uzbekistan 2024	Did not qualify						
Total	4/10	18	6	2	10	37	53

=== UEFA Futsal Championship ===
UEFA Futsal Championship record
Year	Round	Pld	W	D	L	GS	GA
Spain 1996	Did not qualify						
Spain 1999	Did not qualify						
Russia 2001	1st round	3	0	1	2	9	13
Italy 2003	3rd place	4	2	0	2	12	14
Czech Republic 2005	1st round	3	1	0	2	6	9
Portugal 2007	1st round	3	0	0	3	7	17
Hungary 2010	3rd place	5	2	1	2	16	25
Croatia 2012	1st round	2	0	0	2	5	8
Belgium 2014	1st round	2	0	1	1	4	11
Serbia 2016	1st round	2	0	0	2	3	11
Slovenia 2018	Did not qualify						
Netherlands 2022	Did not qualify						
Latvia/Lithuania/Slovenia 2026	Group stage	3	0	1	2	10	13
Total:9/13	3rd place	27	5	4	18	72	121

=== FIFUSA/AMF Futsal World Cup ===
FIFUSA Futsal World Championship record
Year	Round	Pld	W	D	L	GS	GA
Brazil 1982	1st round	4	1	1	2	9	9
Spain 1985	2nd round	?	?	?	?	?	?
Australia 1988	2nd round	?	?	?	?	?	?
Italy 1991	2nd round	?	?	?	?	?	?
Argentina 1994	2nd round	6	1	0	5	17	16
Mexico 1997	1st round	?	?	?	?	?	?
Bolivia 2000	did not enter	-	-	-	-	-	-
Paraguay 2003	1st round	3	2	0	1	13	10
Argentina 2007	Quarter-Finals	4	2	0	2	9	19
Colombia 2011	1st round	3	1	0	2	6	7
Belarus 2015	Quarter-Finals	4	1	1	2	6	9
Argentina 2019	did not enter	-	-	-	-	-	-
Total	10/12	?	?	?	?	?	?

=== Grand Prix de Futsal ===
Grand Prix de Futsal record
Year	Round	Pld	W	D	L	GS	GA
Brazil 2005	did not enter	-	-	-	-	-	-
Brazil 2006	5th Place	2	0	0	2	4	6
Brazil 2007	did not enter	-	-	-	-	-	-
Brazil 2008	8th Place	6	2	1	3	11	11
Brazil 2009	4th Place	6	2	2	2	26	28
Brazil 2010	8th Place	6	1	1	4	16	26
Brazil 2011	8th Place	6	2	1	3	18	22
Brazil 2013	did not enter	-	-	-	-	-	-
Brazil 2014	did not enter	-	-	-	-	-	-
Brazil 2015	did not enter	-	-	-	-	-	-
Brazil 2018	Runners-up	5	3	0	2	24	17
Total	6/11	31	10	5	16	92	102

=== Futsal Confederations Cup ===
Futsal Confederations Cup record
Year	Round	Pld	W	D	L	GS	GA
Libya 2009	did not enter	-	-	-	-	-	-
Brazil 2013	did not enter	-	-	-	-	-	-
Kuwait 2014	Runners-up	5	3	1	1	16	17
Total	1/3	5	3	1	1	16	17

=== Futsal Mundialito ===
Futsal Mundialito record
Year	Round	Pld	W	D*	L	GS	GA
Italy 1994	did not enter	-	-	-	-	-	-
Brazil 1995	did not enter	-	-	-	-	-	-
Brazil 1996	did not enter	-	-	-	-	-	-
Brazil 1998	did not enter	-	-	-	-	-	-
Brazil 2001	Fourth place	4	1	1	2	8	15
Italy 2002	1st round	3	1	0	2	8	10
Portugal 2006	did not enter	-	-	-	-	-	-
Portugal 2007	did not enter	-	-	-	-	-	-
Portugal 2008	did not enter	-	-	-	-	-	-
Total	2/9	7	2	1	4	16	25
