= European Union of Futsal =

International sports governing body

- Sport: Futsal
- Category: Sports federation
- Abbreviation: UEFS
- Founded: 1985 in Spain
- Regional affiliation: Europe
- Headquarters: Moscow, Russia
- Location: Barcelona, Spain
- President: Valeriy Akhumyan

Official website
- www.uefs-fifusa.org

The European Union of Futsal (UEFS), also known as the European Futsal Association, is a European governing body for futsal in the non-FIFA tradition of the sport, distinct from the game administered in Europe by UEFA. According to the Union of International Associations, it was founded in 1985 in Spain to organize futsal and microfutsal competitions across Europe.

UEFS was the European confederation of the Asociación Mundial de Futsal (AMF). Its member teams contested the AMF Futsal World Cup, the 2015 edition of which was held in Belarus. A dispute between the AMF and UEFS that began in 2016 led to UEFS's expulsion in 2017. At a congress that year presided over by AMF president Rolando Alarcón Ríos, Luca Alfieri was elected UEFS president; the AMF-aligned organization he led became the Futsal European Federation (FEF), which the AMF recognized as its European body. UEFS continued separately under president Valeriy Akhumyan.

== Competitions ==
UEFS organized men's and women's tournaments for both national and club teams; member bodies such as the Belarusian Futsal Federation, which joined in 1993, competed in its continental championships.

=== National teams ===
- UEFS Futsal Men's Championship
- UEFS Futsal Women's Championship
- UEFS Futsal Men's Under 21

=== Clubs ===
- UEFS Champions League
- UEFS Cup
- UEFS Veteran European Champions Cup
- UEFS Women's European Champions Cup
- UEFS Women's Cup
