= Belgium national futsal team =

Belgium
- Shirt badge/Association crest
- Nickname(s): Rode Duivels / Diables Rouges (Red Devils)
- Association: Belgian Football Association
- Confederation: UEFA (Europe)
- Head coach: Karim Bachar
- Most caps: Omar Rahou (104)
- Top scorer: Omar Rahou (79)
- FIFA code: BEL
- FIFA ranking: 36 ▼2 (8 May 2026)
Home colours	Away colours

First international
- Belgium 7–2 Netherlands (Genk, Belgium; April 22, 1977)

Biggest win
- Belgium 14–1 Moldova (Ghent, Belgium; October 24, 1995); Belgium 13–0 Malta (Bern, Switzerland; December 17, 2010)

Biggest defeat
- Belgium 1–11 Spain (Ans, Belgium; April 5, 2005)

FIFA World Cup
- Appearances: 3 (First in 1989)
- Best result: 4th place (1989)

AMF World Cup
- Appearances: 5 (First in 1997)
- Best result: 4th place (2015)

UEFA Futsal Championship
- Appearances: 5 (First in 1996)
- Best result: (bronze) 3rd place (1996)

Grand Prix de Futsal
- Appearances: 3 (First in 2007)
- Best result: 5th place (2007, 2018)

The Belgium national futsal team is the national futsal team of Belgium and is controlled by the Belgian Football Association and represents the country in international futsal competitions, such as the FIFA Futsal World Cup and the European Championships.

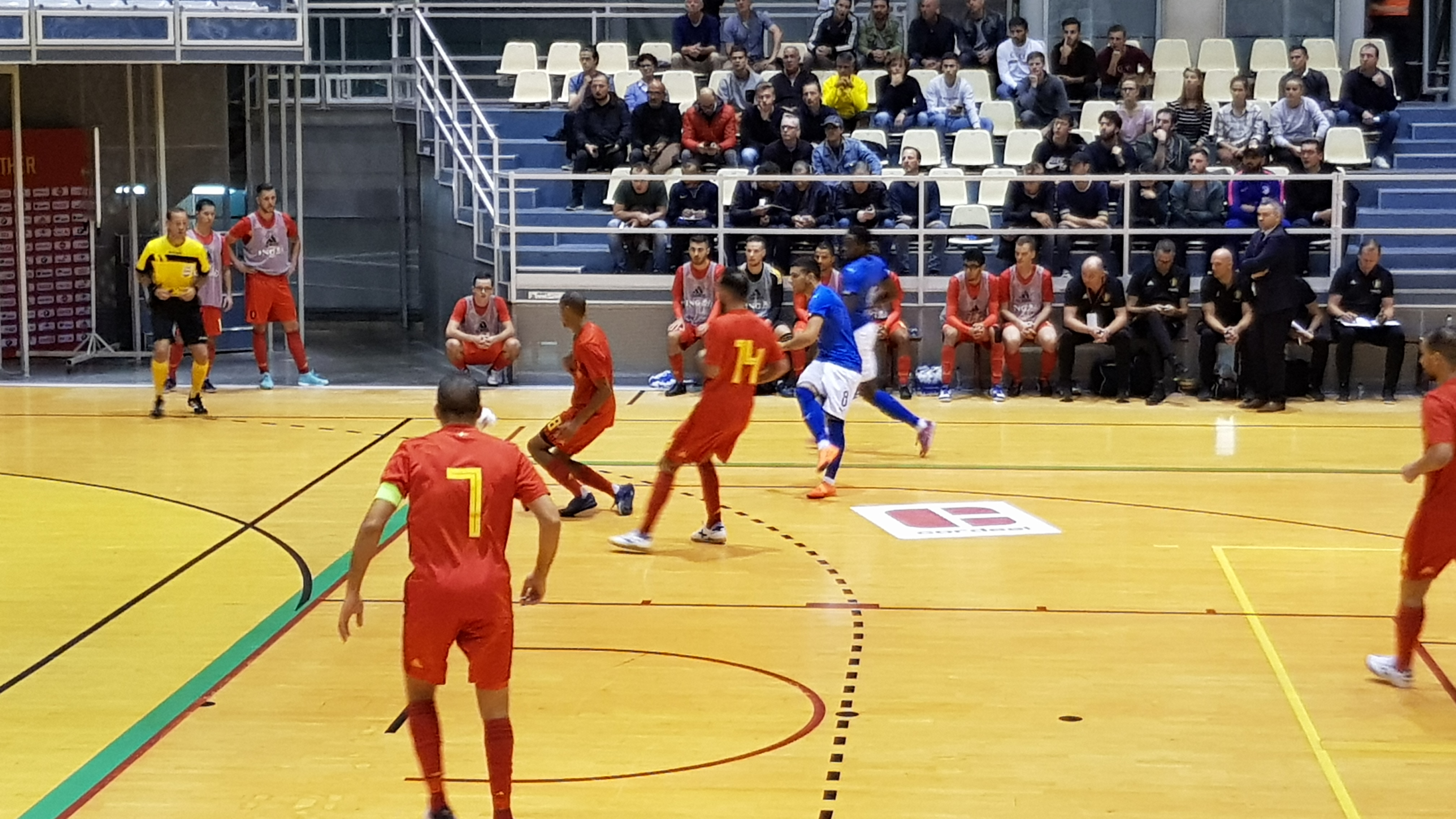
2020 World Cup qualification game Belgium–Italy in Ghent (September 2018)

== Tournament records ==
=== FIFA Futsal World Cup ===
FIFA Futsal World Cup record
Year	Round	Pld	W	D	L	GS	GA
(Netherlands) 1989	4th Place	8	5	2	1	22	11
(Hong Kong) 1992	2nd round	6	3	0	3	17	18
(Spain) 1996	2nd round	6	2	0	4	17	22
(Guatemala) 2000	Did not qualify						
(Chinese Taipei) 2004	Did not qualify						
(Brazil) 2008	Did not qualify						
(Thailand) 2012	Did not qualify						
(Colombia) 2016	Did not qualify						
(Lithuania) 2021	Did not qualify						
(Uzbekistan) 2024	Did not qualify						
Total	3/10	20	10	2	8	56	51

=== UEFA European Futsal Championship ===
UEFA European Futsal Championship Record
Year	Round	Pld	W	D*	L	GS	GA	DIF
(Spain) 1996	3rd Place	4	2	0	2	8	10	–2
(Spain) 1999	Group stage	3	0	1	2	1	7	–6
(Russia) 2001	Did not qualify							
(Italy) 2003	Group stage	3	0	1	2	5	11	–6
(Czech Republic) 2005	Did not qualify							
(Portugal) 2007	Did not qualify							
(Hungary) 2010	Group stage	2	0	0	2	2	8	–6
(Croatia) 2012	Did not qualify							
(Belgium) 2014	Group stage	2	0	1	1	1	6	–5
(Serbia) 2016	Did not qualify							
(Slovenia) 2018	Did not qualify							
(Netherlands) 2022	Did not qualify							
(Latvia) (Lithuania) (Slovenia) 2026	Quarter-finals	4	1	0	3	13	23	-10
Total: 6/13	3rd Place	18	3	3	12	30	65	–35

=== Grand Prix de Futsal ===
Grand Prix de Futsal Record
Year	Round	Pld	W	D	L	GS	GA
2005	did not enter						
2006	did not enter						
2007	5th Place	6	4	0	2	20	23
2008	did not enter						
2009	did not enter						
2010	did not enter						
2011	13th Place	6	3	2	1	32	21
2013	did not enter						
2014	did not enter						
2015	did not enter						
2018	5th Place	4	0	1	3	8	28
Total	3/11	16	7	3	6	60	72

=== Futsal Mundialito ===
Futsal Mundialito Record
Year	Round	Pld	W	D	L	GS	GA
1994	did not enter						
1995	did not enter						
1996	did not enter						
1998	5th Place	4	0	0	4	8	18
2001	did not qualify						
2002	8th Place	4	0	1	3	5	19
2006	did not enter						
2007	did not enter						
2008	did not enter						
Total	2/9	8	0	1	7	13	37

== Players ==
=== Current squad ===
The following players were called up to the squad for the UEFA 2024 FIFA Futsal World Cup qualification matches against Austria and Georgia on 5 and 8 October 2022, respectively.
Head coach: Karim Bachar

No.	Pos.	Player	Date of birth (age)	Caps	Club
1	GK	Moustafa Idrissi	25 July 1996 (age 30)		(Belgium) FT Charleroi
19	GK	Dries Vrancken	11 August 1998 (age 27)		(Belgium) Full Hasselt
3	DF	Charly Beeckman	10 May 1997 (age 29)		(Belgium) Futsal My-Cars
5	DF	Ahmed Sababti (captain)	10 December 1985 (age 40)		(Belgium) FT Antwerpen
8	DF	Ibrahim Adnane	28 September 1993 (age 32)		(Belgium) FT Antwerpen
11	DF	Soufian El Fakiri	7 October 1990 (age 35)		(Belgium) FT Antwerpen
14	DF	Mohamed Dahbi Reda	13 October 1987 (age 38)		(Belgium) FT Charleroi
2	FW	Abdelhakim Sababti	26 May 1992 (age 34)		(Belgium) Real Elmos Herentals
4	FW	Omar Rahou	19 July 1992 (age 34)		(Belgium) Futsal My-Cars
6	FW	Gréllo	4 July 1985 (age 41)		(Belgium) Anderlecht
7	FW	Steven Dillien	24 February 1992 (age 34)		(Belgium) Anderlecht
9	FW	Jawad Yachou	12 July 1994 (age 32)		(Belgium) Real Elmos Herentals
10	FW	Marvin Ghislandi	15 June 1999 (age 27)		(Belgium) FT Charleroi
13	FW	Mouhsin Bouzid	20 February 1998 (age 28)		(Belgium) FT Charleroi
15	FW	Kenneth Vanderheyden	1 October 1999 (age 26)		(Belgium) Full Hasselt
16	FW	Jasper Buyl	27 February 1996 (age 30)		(Belgium) FT Antwerpen

=== Notable players ===
- Liliu
- Lúcio
