= 2019–20 UEFA Futsal Champions League =

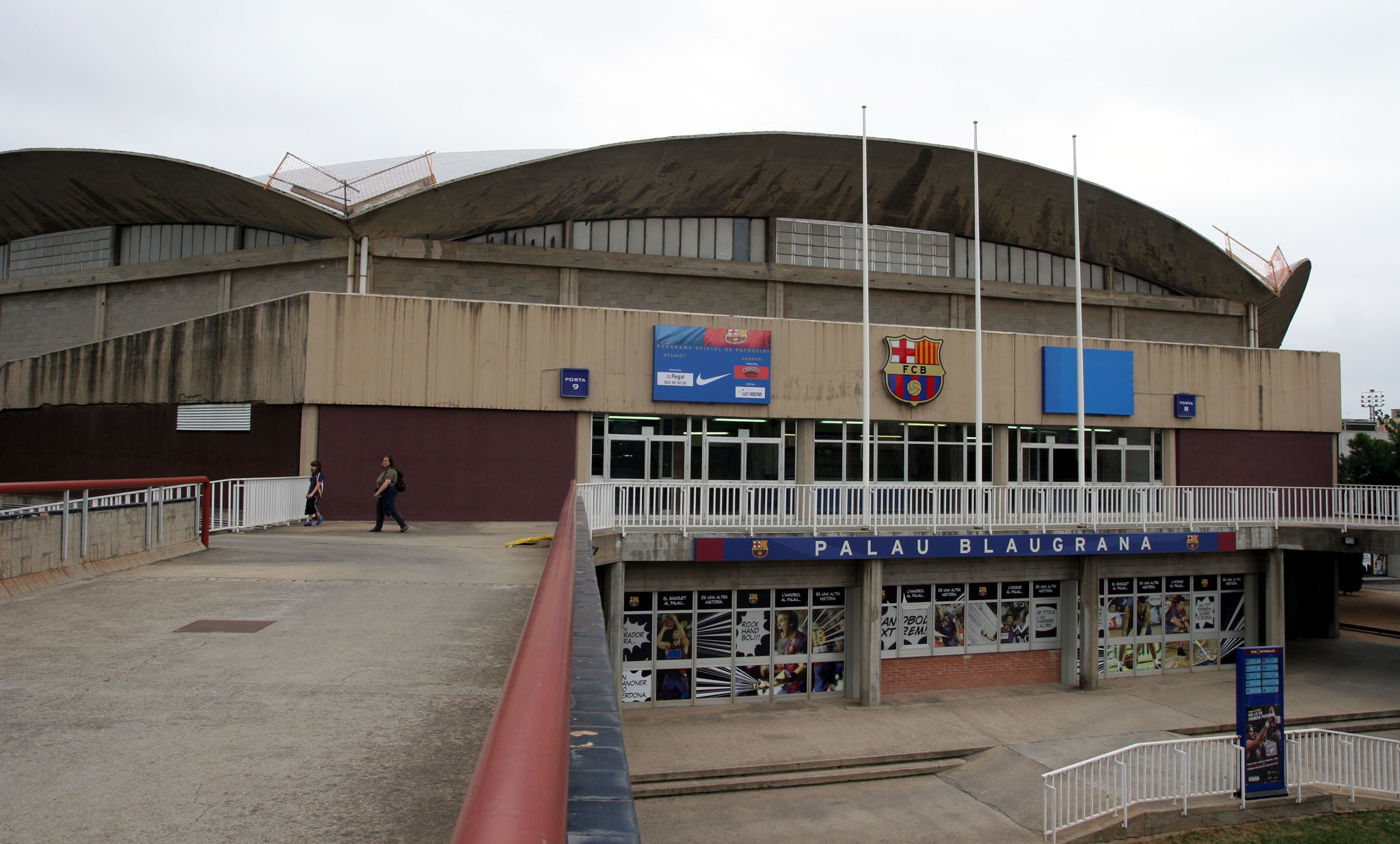
- The Palau Blaugrana in Barcelona hosted the final tournament

Tournament details
- Dates: Qualifying rounds: 27 August – 24 November 2019; Final tournament: 9–11 October 2020
- Teams: Final tournament: 4 Total: 57 (from 53 associations)

Final positions
- Champions: (Spain) Barcelona (3rd title)
- Runners-up: (Spain) ElPozo
- Third place: (Russia) KPRF
- Fourth place: (Russia) Tyumen

Tournament statistics
- Matches played: 124
- Goals scored: 856 (6.9 per match)
- Top scorer(s): Season total: (Brazil) Renan Roberto Mantelli (16 goals); Final tournament: (Russia) Yanar Asadov (2 goals)

The 2019–20 UEFA Futsal Champions League was the 34th edition of Europe's premier club futsal tournament, and the 19th edition organized by UEFA. It was also the second edition since the tournament was rebranded from "UEFA Futsal Cup" to "UEFA Futsal Champions League".

The final tournament, originally scheduled to be played from 24 to 26 April 2020 at the Minsk Arena in Minsk, Belarus, was postponed due to the COVID-19 pandemic in Europe. On 17 June 2020, UEFA announced that the final tournament would be played from 9 to 11 October 2020 at the Palau Blaugrana in Barcelona, Spain behind closed doors.

Barcelona defeated ElPozo in the final to win their third title. Sporting CP were the defending champions, but were eliminated in the elite round.

== Association team allocation ==
The association ranking based on the UEFA futsal national team coefficients is used to determine the number of participating teams for each association:

- The top three-ranked associations can enter two teams.
- The winners of the 2018–19 UEFA Futsal Champions League qualify automatically, and thus their association can also enter a second team. If they are from the top three-ranked associations, the fourth-ranked association can also enter two teams.
- All other associations can enter one team (the winners of their regular top domestic futsal league, or in special circumstances, the runners-up).

For this season, the top four-ranked associations, Spain, Portugal, Russia and Kazakhstan, can enter two teams, as Portugal's entries include the title holders, Sporting CP.

=== Distribution ===
Teams are ranked according to their UEFA futsal club coefficients, computed based on results of the last three seasons, to decide on the round they enter, as well as their seeding position in the preliminary round and main round draws.

The following is the access list for this season.

Access list for 2019–20 UEFA Futsal Champions League
		Teams entering in this round	Teams advancing from previous round
Preliminary round (34 teams)		34 teams ranked 23–56	
Main round	Path A (16 teams)	1 title holder; 15 teams ranked 1–11 and 16–19	
Main round	Path B (16 teams)	7 teams ranked 12–15 and 20–22	9 group winners from preliminary round
Elite round (16 teams)			4 group winners from main round path A; 4 group runners-up from main round path A; 4 group third-placed team from main round path A; 4 group winners from main round path B
Final tournament (4 teams)			4 group winners from elite round

=== Teams ===
An equal-record total of 57 teams from 53 of the 55 UEFA associations entered this season's competition (Faroe Islands and Liechtenstein did not enter).

The draws for the preliminary round and main round were held on 4 July 2019, 14:00 CEST (UTC+2), at the UEFA headquarters in Nyon, Switzerland. The mechanism of the draws for each round was as follows:

- In the preliminary round, the 34 teams were drawn into nine groups: seven groups of four containing one team from each of the seeding positions 1–4, and two groups of three containing one team from each of the seeding positions 1–3. First, the nine teams which were pre-selected as hosts were drawn from their own designated pot and allocated to their respective group as per their seeding positions. Next, the remaining 25 teams were drawn from their respective pot which were allocated according to their seeding positions.
- In the main round Path B, the 16 teams were drawn into four groups of four, containing one team from each of the seeding positions 1–4. First, the four teams which were pre-selected as hosts were drawn from their own designated pot and allocated to their respective group as per their seeding positions. Next, the remaining 12 teams were drawn from their respective pot which were allocated according to their seeding positions (including the nine preliminary round winners, whose identity was not known at the time of the draw, which were allocated to first seeding position 4, then seeding position 3, then seeding position 2).
- In the main round Path A, the 16 teams were drawn into four groups of four, containing one team from each of the seeding positions 1–4. First, the four teams which were pre-selected as hosts were drawn from their own designated pot and allocated to their respective group as per their seeding positions. Next, the remaining 12 teams were drawn from their respective pot which were allocated according to their seeding positions. Teams from the same association could be drawn in the same group. Based on the decisions taken by the UEFA Emergency Panel, teams from Russia and Ukraine could not be drawn in the same group.

Legend

- TH: Title holders
- (H): Preliminary and main round hosts

Qualified teams for 2019–20 UEFA Futsal Champions League

Teams entering main round
Rank	Association	Team	Coeff.	Path	Seed
TH	Portugal (Team 2)	Sporting CP	67.883	A	1
1	Spain (Team 1)	Barcelona	46.501	A	1
2	Kazakhstan (Team 1)	Kairat	42.667	A	1
3	Portugal (Team 1)	Benfica	30.833	A	1
4	Spain (Team 2)	ElPozo	29.167	A	2
5	Serbia	Ekonomac	19.001	A	2
6	Belgium	Halle-Gooik (H)	15.999	A	2
7	Kazakhstan (Team 2)	Ayat	15.000	A	2
8	Russia (Team 1)	Tyumen	13.833	A	3
9	Russia (Team 2)	KPRF	13.883	A	3
10	Azerbaijan	Araz Naxçivan	12.500	A	3
11	Slovenia	Dobovec (H)	9.167	A	3
12	Belarus	Stalitsa Minsk (H)	9.167	B	1
13	Italy	Italservice Pesaro	8.833	B	1
14	Croatia	Novo Vrijeme (H)	8.667	B	1
15	Poland	Rekord Bielsko-Biała	8.335	B	1
16	Hungary	MVFC Berettyóújfalu (H)	7.334	A	4
17	Ukraine	Prodexim Kherson	7.333	A	4
18	Lithuania	Vytis (H)	6.583	A	4
19	Bosnia and Herzegovina	Mostar	5.501	A	4
20	Czech Republic	Sparta Praha (H)	5.000	B	2
21	Kosovo	Liburni	4.667	B	2
22	Sweden	Uddevalla (H)	4.335	B	2

Teams entering preliminary round
Rank	Association	Team	Coeff.	Seed
23	Armenia	Leo	4.251	1
24	Romania	Miercurea Ciuc	4.167	1
25	Slovakia	Pinerola Bratislava	3.833	1
26	Latvia	LDZ Cargo/DFA	3.667	1
27	Georgia	Georgians Tbilisi	3.334	1
28	Malta	Luxol St Andrews	3.334	1
29	Germany	TSV Weilimdorf	3.250	1
30	Netherlands	Hovocubo (H)	3.167	1
31	Finland	Kampuksen Dynamo	2.833	1
32	Switzerland	Minerva	2.626	2
33	Denmark	JB Gentofte	2.335	2
34	Cyprus	Omonia (H)	2.167	2
35	France	Toulon Élite	2.000	2
36	North Macedonia	Shkupi (H)	1.834	2
37	England	Helvécia	1.667	2
38	Bulgaria	Varna City (H)	1.500	2
39	Norway	Sjarmtrollan (H)	1.417	2
40	Austria	Allstars (H)	1.167	2
41	Montenegro	Titograd (H)	1.167	3
42	Moldova	Dinamo Chişinău	1.167	3
43	Gibraltar	Lynx	1.001	3
44	Greece	AEK (H)	1.000	3
45	Israel	Maccabi Nahalat Yitzhak Tel Aviv	0.833	3
46	Albania	Tirana	0.750	3
47	Luxembourg	Racing Luxembourg	0.750	3
48	Wales	Cardiff University	0.501	3
49	Turkey	Gazi Üniversitesi	0.500	3
50	Republic of Ireland	Blue Magic	0.334	4
51	Estonia	SMS Viimsi (H)	0.333	4
52	Andorra	Encamp	0.251	4
53	San Marino	Fiorentino	0.167	4
54	Iceland	Vængir Júpiters	0.000	4
55	Northern Ireland	Sparta Belfast	0.000	4
56	Scotland	PYF Saltires	0.000	4

== Format ==
In the preliminary round, main round, and elite round, each group is played as a round-robin mini-tournament at the pre-selected hosts.

In the final tournament, the four qualified teams play in knockout format (semi-finals, third place match, and final), either at a host selected by UEFA from one of the qualified teams or at a neutral venue.

=== Tiebreakers ===
In the preliminary round, main round, and elite round, teams are ranked according to points (3 points for a win, 1 point for a draw, 0 points for a loss), and if tied on points, the following tiebreaking criteria are applied, in the order given, to determine the rankings (Regulations Articles 14.01 and 14.02):

1. Points in head-to-head matches among tied teams;
2. Goal difference in head-to-head matches among tied teams;
3. Goals scored in head-to-head matches among tied teams;
4. If more than two teams are tied, and after applying all head-to-head criteria above, a subset of teams are still tied, all head-to-head criteria above are reapplied exclusively to this subset of teams;
5. Goal difference in all group matches;
6. Goals scored in all group matches;
7. Penalty shoot-out if only two teams have the same number of points, and they met in the last round of the group and are tied after applying all criteria above (not used if more than two teams have the same number of points, or if their rankings are not relevant for qualification for the next stage);
8. Disciplinary points (red card = 3 points, yellow card = 1 point, expulsion for two yellow cards in one match = 3 points);
9. UEFA club coefficient;
10. Drawing of lots.

== Schedule ==
The schedule of the competition is as follows.

Schedule for 2019–20 UEFA Futsal Champions League
Round	Draw	Dates
Preliminary round	4 July 2019	27 August – 1 September 2019
Main round	4 July 2019	8–13 October 2019
Elite round	18 October 2019	19–24 November 2019
Final tournament	5 February 2020	Semi-finals: 9 October 2020 (originally 24 April 2020); Third place match & Final: 11 October 2020 (originally 26 April 2020)

In the preliminary round, main round and elite round, the schedule of each group is as follows, with one rest day between matchdays 2 and 3 for four-team groups, and no rest days for three-team groups (Regulations Articles 19.04, 19.05 and 19.06):

Note: For scheduling, the hosts are considered as Team 1, while the visiting teams are considered as Team 2, Team 3, and Team 4 according to their seeding positions.

Group schedule
Matchday	Matches (4 teams)	Matches (3 teams)
Matchday 1	2 v 4, 3 v 1	3 v 1
Matchday 2	3 v 2, 1 v 4	2 v 3
Matchday 3	4 v 3, 1 v 2	1 v 2

== Preliminary round ==
The winners of each group advanced to the main round Path B to join the seven teams which receive byes (another 16 teams receive byes to the main round Path A). The preliminary round was scheduled to be played between 27 August and 1 September 2019.

Times are CEST (UTC+2), as listed by UEFA (local times, if different, are in parentheses).

=== Group A ===
Pos	Team	Pld	W	D	L	GF	GA	GD	Pts	Qualification
1	(France) Toulon Élite	3	2	1	0	22	10	+12	7	Main round
2	(Estonia) SMS Viimsi (H)	3	2	1	0	15	8	+7	7	
3	(Finland) Kampuksen Dynamo	3	1	0	2	4	11	−7	3	
4	(Albania) Tirana	3	0	0	3	5	17	−12	0	

Source: UEFA
Rules for classification: Tiebreakers
(H) Hosts
28 August 2019
15:30 (16:30 EEST)

Kampuksen Dynamo (Finland)	1–0	(Albania) Tirana
Rautiainen 25:55	Report

Kalev Sports Hall, Tallinn
Referee: Filip Nešněra (Czech Republic), Daniel Decă (Romania)
28 August 2019
18:30 (19:30 EEST)

Toulon Élite (France)	5–5	(Estonia) SMS Viimsi
Pupa 6:00; Martins 6:26, 26:39, 39:59; Sanz Sendon 37:52	Report	Makarov 10:14; Kostin 10:49; Chudnov 20:39; Fetko 28:11, 36:18

Kalev Sports Hall, Tallinn
Referee: Dejan Veselič (Slovenia), Rastislav Behančín (Slovakia)

29 August 2019
15:30 (16:30 EEST)

Toulon Élite (France)	8–2	(Finland) Kampuksen Dynamo
Martins 4:15; Keny 15:57, 34:45; Korsunov 19:06 (o.g.); Tavares De Pina 22:14, 31:41, 35:41; De Menezes Souza 36:00	Report	David Parente 2:00, 26:37

Kalev Sports Hall, Tallinn
Referee: Rastislav Behančín (Slovakia), Filip Nešněra (Czech Republic)
29 August 2019
18:30 (19:30 EEST)

SMS Viimsi (Estonia)	7–2	(Albania) Tirana
Fetko 9:37; Merkurjev 18:30; Chudnov 21:52; Makarov 24:39; Stüf 26:34, 28:15; Kostin 33:20	Report	Rukovci 21:39; Kaca 29:21

Kalev Sports Hall, Tallinn
Referee: Daniel Decă (Romania), Dejan Veselič (Slovenia)

31 August 2019
15:30 (16:30 EEST)

Tirana (Albania)	3–9	(France) Toulon Élite
Kaca 1:51; Licaj 26:29; Rukovci 39:06	Report	Martins 0:25, 21:21; Souza Da Costa 14:41; Tavares De Pina 17:27, 18:44 (2pen.), 20:47, 27:32; Sanz Sendon 32:24; De Menezes Souza 33:22

Kalev Sports Hall, Tallinn
Referee: Daniel Decă (Romania), Filip Nešněra (Czech Republic)
31 August 2019
18:30 (19:30 EEST)

SMS Viimsi (Estonia)	3–1	(Finland) Kampuksen Dynamo
Fetko 15:35 (pen.), 39:55; O. Sorokin 19:57	Report	Rautiainen 25:13

Kalev Sports Hall, Tallinn
Referee: Dejan Veselič (Slovenia), Rastislav Behančín (Slovakia)

=== Group B ===
Pos	Team	Pld	W	D	L	GF	GA	GD	Pts	Qualification
1	(North Macedonia) Shkupi (H)	3	3	0	0	19	3	+16	9	Main round
2	(Latvia) LDZ Cargo/DFA	3	2	0	1	14	7	+7	6	
3	(Wales) Cardiff University	3	1	0	2	5	11	−6	3	
4	(Andorra) Encamp	3	0	0	3	5	22	−17	0	

Source: UEFA
Rules for classification: Tiebreakers
(H) Hosts
28 August 2019
17:30

LDZ Cargo/DFA (Latvia)	7–3	(Andorra) Encamp
Halimons 5:50, 9:25, 15:04 (2pen.), 17:58 (2pen.); Raščevskis 11:40, 30:26; Borisovs 20:29	Report	Alves 8:04; San Segundo 21:22; Genís García 39:03

SRC Kale, Skopje
Attendance: 40
Referee: Jagnar Jakobson (Estonia), Nebojša Panić (Serbia)
28 August 2019
20:00

Cardiff University (Wales)	0–5	(North Macedonia) Shkupi
	Report	Agushi 9:44; Ceka 12:14, 29:27; Gligorov 23:01; Dimovski 27:15

SRC Kale, Skopje
Attendance: 1000
Referee: Marco Rothenfluh (Switzerland), Turekhan Tursumbayev (Kazakhstan)

29 August 2019
17:30

Cardiff University (Wales)	1–5	(Latvia) LDZ Cargo/DFA
Maynard 32:01	Report	Kozhemiaka 8:41; Cirilo 11:36, 13:24, 39:38; Halimons 14:28

SRC Kale, Skopje
Attendance: 20
Referee: Turekhan Tursumbayev (Kazakhstan), Jagnar Jakobson (Estonia)
29 August 2019
20:00

Shkupi (North Macedonia)	11–1	(Andorra) Encamp
Sulejman 5:34, 6:35, 23:41; Gligorov 9:09; Seferi 10:22, 17:59, 31:14; Petrović 19:45 (2pen.); San Segundo 25:40 (o.g.); Shabani 29:36; Ismaili 35:11	Report	Neira 34:17

SRC Kale, Skopje
Attendance: 800
Referee: Nebojša Panić (Serbia), Marco Rothenfluh (Switzerland)

31 August 2019
17:30

Encamp (Andorra)	1–4	(Wales) Cardiff University
Andreu 10:57	Report	Bell 14:00; Emanuel 17:12; Dabbs 30:43, 38:31

SRC Kale, Skopje
Attendance: 30
Referee: Marco Rothenfluh (Switzerland), Turekhan Tursumbayev (Kazakhstan)
31 August 2019
20:00

Shkupi (North Macedonia)	3–2	(Latvia) LDZ Cargo/DFA
Seferi 4:26; Berisha 12:06; Petrović 35:42	Report	Raščevskis 23:52, 32:36

SRC Kale, Skopje
Attendance: 1400
Referee: Nebojša Panić (Serbia), Jagnar Jakobson (Estonia)

=== Group C ===
Pos	Team	Pld	W	D	L	GF	GA	GD	Pts	Qualification
1	(Romania) Miercurea Ciuc	3	3	0	0	19	6	+13	9	Main round
2	(Switzerland) Minerva	3	1	1	1	11	13	−2	4	
3	(Republic of Ireland) Blue Magic	3	0	2	1	8	17	−9	2	
4	(Greece) AEK (H)	3	0	1	2	10	12	−2	1	

Source: UEFA
Rules for classification: Tiebreakers
(H) Hosts
28 August 2019
16:30 (17:30 EEST)

Miercurea Ciuc (Romania)	9–0	(Republic of Ireland) Blue Magic
F. Matei 1:58; Hector 4:50; Pršić 10:32, 30:49, 39:49; Alvarito 12:36, 39:16 (2pen.); M. Matei 15:13, 16:01	Report

Dais Sports Center, Athens
Referee: Aurélien Uzan (France), Murat Çolak (Turkey)
28 August 2019
19:00 (20:00 EEST)

Minerva (Switzerland)	4–3	(Greece) AEK
Ruiz Fernandez 6:32, 7:36; Turé 38:02; Santona 38:46	Report	Thanasai 19:59 (2pen.); V. Asimakopoulos 35:42; K. Panou 36:50

Dais Sports Center, Athens
Referee: Hikmat Qafarli (Azerbaijan), Damian Grabowski (Poland)

29 August 2019
16:30 (17:30 EEST)

Minerva (Switzerland)	3–6	(Romania) Miercurea Ciuc
Marcoyannakis 2:55; Soares 7:48; Turé 23:52	Report	Hector 0:28; Pršić 3:37, 39:37; M. Matei 14:37; F. Matei 32:36; Deco 34:04

Dais Sports Center, Athens
Referee: Damian Grabowski (Poland), Aurélien Uzan (France)
29 August 2019
19:00 (20:00 EEST)

AEK (Greece)	4–4	(Republic of Ireland) Blue Magic
Manos 8:14; Hatzifotiou 9:56; K. Panou 15:56 (pen.); Skoutelis 33:05	Report	Micoski Lucas 9:47, 39:20; Byrne 19:15, 38:46

Dais Sports Center, Athens
Referee: Murat Çolak (Turkey), Hikmat Qafarli (Azerbaijan)

31 August 2019
16:30 (17:30 EEST)

Blue Magic (Republic of Ireland)	4–4	(Switzerland) Minerva
Byrne 23:10, 26:07, 36:19; Micoski Lucas 39:59 (2pen.)	Report	Turé 26:34; Mezger 28:23, 39:43 (pen.); Soares 38:46

Dais Sports Center, Athens
Referee: Aurélien Uzan (France), Murat Çolak (Turkey)
31 August 2019
19:00 (20:00 EEST)

AEK (Greece)	3–4	(Romania) Miercurea Ciuc
Thanasai 6:02 (pen.); Ntatis 28:30; Szöcs 39:41 (o.g.)	Report	Alvarito 10:47; Hector 17:43; Pršić 25:05; Savio Valadares 33:10

Dais Sports Center, Athens
Referee: Hikmat Qafarli (Azerbaijan), Damian Grabowski (Poland)

=== Group D ===
Pos	Team	Pld	W	D	L	GF	GA	GD	Pts	Qualification
1	(Cyprus) Omonia (H)	3	2	1	0	21	8	+13	7	Main round
2	(Turkey) Gazi Üniversitesi	3	2	0	1	12	11	+1	6	
3	(Slovakia) Pinerola Bratislava	3	1	1	1	15	9	+6	4	
4	(Iceland) Vængir Júpiters	3	0	0	3	2	22	−20	0	

Source: UEFA
Rules for classification: Tiebreakers
(H) Hosts
27 August 2019
15:30 (16:30 EEST)

Pinerola Bratislava (Slovakia)	8–0	(Iceland) Vængir Júpiters
Čeřovský 2:50; Halás 19:05; Štefaňák 24:58, 39:48; Bagin 30:41, 34:59; Kozár 32:56; Zaťovič 38:17	Report

Eleftheria Indoor Hall, Nicosia
Referee: Norbert Szilágyi (Hungary), Ademir Avdic (Sweden)
27 August 2019
18:00 (19:00 EEST)

Gazi Üniversitesi (Turkey)	2–8	(Cyprus) Omonia
Ozkul 13:14; Duzluoglu 16:30	Report	Mantelli 0:43, 20:43, 34:56, 37:19; Manoli 1:23; Diniz Pereira 1:50; Stylianou 6:07; Wanderson 36:04

Eleftheria Indoor Hall, Nicosia
Referee: Josip Dujmić (Croatia), Clinton Mario Cassar (Malta)

28 August 2019
15:30 (16:30 EEST)

Gazi Üniversitesi (Turkey)	4–2	(Slovakia) Pinerola Bratislava
Aydogan 3:07; Ugurlu 32:05; Zaťovič 32:31 (o.g.); Sümer Alvurdu 35:01	Report	Bagin 37:27; Marušinec 39:28

Eleftheria Indoor Hall, Nicosia
Referee: Clinton Mario Cassar (Malta), Norbert Szilágyi (Hungary)
28 August 2019
18:00 (19:00 EEST)

Omonia (Cyprus)	8–1	(Iceland) Vængir Júpiters
Mantelli 1:09, 2:18, 8:39; Diniz Pereira 2:47; Alves De Lima 4:32, 30:19; Stylianou 5:38; Manoli 23:13	Report	Rögnvaldsson 6:57

Eleftheria Indoor Hall, Nicosia
Referee: Ademir Avdic (Sweden), Josip Dujmić (Croatia)

30 August 2019
15:30 (16:30 EEST)

Vængir Júpiters (Iceland)	1–6	(Turkey) Gazi Üniversitesi
K. Kristinsson 13:53 (pen.)	Report	Ugurlu 5:41 (pen.), 6:05, 35:44; Aydogan 10:23; Guler 36:06; Koker 37:43

Eleftheria Indoor Hall, Nicosia
Referee: Josip Dujmić (Croatia), Ademir Avdic (Sweden)
30 August 2019
18:00 (19:00 EEST)

Omonia (Cyprus)	5–5	(Slovakia) Pinerola Bratislava
Alves De Lima 9:53, 18:56; Wanderson 10:17; G. Ioannou 24:38; Mantelli 35:51	Report	Kozár 0:28, 10:42, 13:34; Štrbák 16:19; Kyjovský 37:54

Eleftheria Indoor Hall, Nicosia
Referee: Norbert Szilágyi (Hungary), Clinton Mario Cassar (Malta)

=== Group E ===
Pos	Team	Pld	W	D	L	GF	GA	GD	Pts	Qualification
1	(Germany) TSV Weilimdorf	3	3	0	0	22	9	+13	9	Main round
2	(Austria) Allstars (H)	3	2	0	1	20	15	+5	6	
3	Racing Luxembourg	3	1	0	2	14	19	−5	3	
4	(Northern Ireland) Sparta Belfast	3	0	0	3	9	22	−13	0	

Source: UEFA
Rules for classification: Tiebreakers
(H) Hosts
28 August 2019
18:00

TSV Weilimdorf (Germany)	5–1	(Northern Ireland) Sparta Belfast
Bozinovic 0:45, 30:29, 36:35; Sipahi 15:36; Kopyt 29:28 (o.g.)	Report	Marcote 36:07

Arena Nova, Wiener Neustadt
Referee: Mantas Pomeckis (Lithuania), Denys Kutsyi (Ukraine)
28 August 2019
20:30

Racing Luxembourg	3–6	(Austria) Allstars
Carlos Soares 0:42, 0:56; Soares Valente 27:53	Report	Nuhanovic 8:32, 9:07; Muharemovic 9:19; Muharemovic 17:41 (2pen.); Škorić 26:24, 34:54

Arena Nova, Wiener Neustadt
Referee: Christos Christou (Cyprus), Done Ristovski (North Macedonia)

29 August 2019
18:00

Racing Luxembourg	3–9	(Germany) TSV Weilimdorf
Carlos Soares 18:06, 28:20; Da Veiga Monteiro 37:59 (2pen.)	Report	Bozinovic 4:07; Čačić 5:03, 10:33, 33:14; Delić 9:10, 33:49 (2pen.); Sipahi 30:47; Fischer 35:27; Windhager 38:10

Arena Nova, Wiener Neustadt
Referee: Done Ristovski (North Macedonia), Mantas Pomeckis (Lithuania)
29 August 2019
20:30

Allstars (Austria)	9–4	(Northern Ireland) Sparta Belfast
Jatic 3:35; Huseinbasic 5:52, 26:49; Muharemovic 14:05, 22:20, 32:34 (2pen.); Nuhanovic 14:33; Škorić 17:20; Muharemovic 39:25 (2pen.)	Report	Marcote 2:21, 24:11 (pen.); Millar 24:26; Wilson 39:58

Arena Nova, Wiener Neustadt
Referee: Denys Kutsyi (Ukraine), Christos Christou (Cyprus)

31 August 2019
18:00

Sparta Belfast (Northern Ireland)	4–8	Racing Luxembourg
Millar 11:38; Roohi 16:50; Marcote 21:29; Wilson 39:55	Report	Agovic 8:50, 33:28; Soares Valente 9:23; Teves Rocha 15:56; Da Veiga Monteiro 23:16, 36:33, 37:46; Paixão Guerrinha 32:06

Arena Nova, Wiener Neustadt
Referee: Done Ristovski (North Macedonia), Denys Kutsyi (Ukraine)
31 August 2019
20:30

Allstars (Austria)	5–8	(Germany) TSV Weilimdorf
Bezer 7:12; Baur 23:50 (o.g.); Nuhanovic 28:44; Skrgic 36:16; Muharemovic 39:32	Report	Matkovic 12:55, 17:30; Baur 16:10; Čačić 19:26, 24:47, 32:12; Sipahi 20:37, 30:27

Arena Nova, Wiener Neustadt
Referee: Christos Christou (Cyprus), Mantas Pomeckis (Lithuania)

=== Group F ===
Pos	Team	Pld	W	D	L	GF	GA	GD	Pts	Qualification
1	(Malta) Luxol St Andrews	3	3	0	0	18	6	+12	9	Main round
2	(Moldova) Dinamo Chişinău	3	1	1	1	14	9	+5	4	
3	(Norway) Sjarmtrollan (H)	3	1	1	1	7	10	−3	4	
4	(San Marino) Fiorentino	3	0	0	3	2	16	−14	0	

Source: UEFA
Rules for classification: Tiebreakers
(H) Hosts
28 August 2019
17:00

Luxol St Andrews (Malta)	5–0	(San Marino) Fiorentino
Bizjak 10:18; Vevé 20:00, 29:41; Maikinho 21:16; Celino Alves 22:28	Report

Tromsøhallen, Tromsø
Referee: Shota Kukhilava (Georgia), Gordon Mccabe (Scotland)
28 August 2019
19:30

Dinamo Chişinău (Moldova)	2–2	(Norway) Sjarmtrollan
Kalukov 4:06; Bagriak 4:49	Report	Schjetne 10:05; Vucenovic 25:24

Tromsøhallen, Tromsø
Referee: Alem Bajrović (Bosnia and Herzegovina), Lars Van Leeuwen (Netherlands)

29 August 2019
17:00

Dinamo Chişinău (Moldova)	3–5	(Malta) Luxol St Andrews
Cherniavskyi 23:16; Negara 39:13 (2pen.); Kalukov 39:39	Report	Maikinho 9:15; Celino Alves 20:29; Răducu 21:18; Vevé 36:20; Bizjak 37:46

Tromsøhallen, Tromsø
Referee: Lars Van Leeuwen (Netherlands), Shota Kukhilava (Georgia)
29 August 2019
19:30

Sjarmtrollan (Norway)	2–0	(San Marino) Fiorentino
Vucenovic 1:06; Vucenovic 17:48	Report

Tromsøhallen, Tromsø
Referee: Gordon Mccabe (Scotland), Alem Bajrović (Bosnia and Herzegovina)

31 August 2019
11:00

Fiorentino (San Marino)	2–9	(Moldova) Dinamo Chişinău
Belloni 3:16; Righi 18:21	Report	Kalukov 2:11, 24:55; Coceban 11:32; Busignani 15:50 (o.g.); Cherniavskyi 28:24, 34:06; Negara 31:39; Bondarenko 35:06; Fil 36:38 (pen.)

Tromsøhallen, Tromsø
Referee: Shota Kukhilava (Georgia), Lars Van Leeuwen (Netherlands)
31 August 2019
13:30

Sjarmtrollan (Norway)	3–8	(Malta) Luxol St Andrews
Vucenovic 0:42, 19:10 (2pen.), 26:04	Report	Sant' Anna Coriolano 3:49; Vevé 8:00; Maikinho 8:53, 34:10, 35:08; Bizjak 14:32 (2pen.), 37:57; Celino Alves 18:21

Tromsøhallen, Tromsø
Referee: Alem Bajrović (Bosnia and Herzegovina), Gordon Mccabe (Scotland)

=== Group G ===
Pos	Team	Pld	W	D	L	GF	GA	GD	Pts	Qualification
1	(Netherlands) Hovocubo (H)	3	3	0	0	20	3	+17	9	Main round
2	(England) Helvécia	3	2	0	1	17	11	+6	6	
3	(Scotland) PYF Saltires	3	1	0	2	9	18	−9	3	
4	(Gibraltar) Lynx	3	0	0	3	6	20	−14	0	

Source: UEFA
Rules for classification: Tiebreakers
(H) Hosts
27 August 2019
17:30

Helvécia (England)	7–3	(Scotland) PYF Saltires
Ari 1:04; Agusti Hidalgo 8:20, 8:50, 16:32; Raoni Medina 14:55; Dow 35:46 (o.g.); Álex del Amor 36:50	Report	Steedman 33:10, 34:43; K. Ballingall 39:04 (pen.)

Sporthal De Opgang, Zwaag
Referee: Maksim Dzeikala (Belarus), Raafat Al Hamola (Israel)
27 August 2019
20:00

Hovocubo (Netherlands)	6–1	(Gibraltar) Lynx
St Juste 5:55, 14:13; Darri 10:44; Molkarai 11:40; Mellah 13:10; Amrani 37:41	Report	Popo 12:08

Sporthal De Opgang, Zwaag
Referee: Christian Gundler (Germany), Daniele D'adamo (San Marino)

28 August 2019
17:30

Lynx (Gibraltar)	4–9	(England) Helvécia
Monti 1:45 (o.g.); El Andaloussi 10:45; Ruiz 16:50; Lopez 23:33	Report	Agusti Hidalgo 6:27, 23:48; Monti 15:32; Raoni Medina 17:52, 33:06; Lucas Ferras 25:01, 35:34; Álex del Amor 32:31, 36:08

Sporthal De Opgang, Zwaag
Referee: Raafat Al Hamola (Israel), Christian Gundler (Germany)
28 August 2019
20:00

Hovocubo (Netherlands)	10–1	(Scotland) PYF Saltires
Bouyouzan 0:56, 9:31; St Juste 2:59; Darri 4:48, 17:24, 18:30; Attahiri 7:50; Mellah 11:21; Amrani 33:34, 39:58	Report	McLaren 36:53

Sporthal De Opgang, Zwaag
Referee: Daniele D'adamo (San Marino), Maksim Dzeikala (Belarus)

30 August 2019
17:30

PYF Saltires (Scotland)	5–1	(Gibraltar) Lynx
McLaren 13:58, 34:56, 37:09; Kelly 27:46, 39:29	Report	Lopez 1:31

Sporthal De Opgang, Zwaag
Referee: Raafat Al Hamola (Israel), Daniele D'adamo (San Marino)
30 August 2019
20:00

Hovocubo (Netherlands)	4–1	(England) Helvécia
Molkarai 3:09, 10:05, 36:37; Darri 18:23	Report	Monti 25:24

Sporthal De Opgang, Zwaag
Referee: Maksim Dzeikala (Belarus), Christian Gundler (Germany)

=== Group H ===
Pos	Team	Pld	W	D	L	GF	GA	GD	Pts	Qualification
1	(Georgia (country)) Georgians Tbilisi	2	2	0	0	12	3	+9	6	Main round
2	(Israel) Maccabi Nahalat Yitzhak Tel Aviv	2	1	0	1	3	10	−7	3	
3	(Bulgaria) Varna City (H)	2	0	0	2	5	7	−2	0	

Source: UEFA
Rules for classification: Tiebreakers
(H) Hosts
29 August 2019
18:00 (19:00 EEST)

Maccabi Nahalat Yitzhak Tel Aviv (Israel)	3–2	(Bulgaria) Varna City
Diedunov 2:55; Cohen 15:01; Stunis 33:53	Report	Bl. Marev 24:58; Petev 34:23

Palace of Culture and Sports, Varna
Referee: Martin Køster (Denmark), David Berry (Republic of Ireland)

30 August 2019
18:00 (19:00 EEST)

Georgians Tbilisi (Georgia (country))	8–0	(Israel) Maccabi Nahalat Yitzhak Tel Aviv
Lukava 3:49; Vadot 8:40 (o.g.); Kekelia 11:01; Maisaia 18:12; Jvarashvili 30:02, 38:31; Kurtanidze 30:42; Tskhomaria 37:09	Report

Palace of Culture and Sports, Varna
Referee: Eduards Fatkuļins (Latvia), Martin Køster (Denmark)

31 August 2019
18:00 (19:00 EEST)

Varna City (Bulgaria)	3–4	(Georgia (country)) Georgians Tbilisi
Boycho Marev 11:10; Tipau 16:57, 33:03	Report	Lukava 12:51; Maisaia 16:00; Сhumburidze 29:55; Todua 35:32

Palace of Culture and Sports, Varna
Referee: David Berry (Republic of Ireland), Eduards Fatkuļins (Latvia)

=== Group I ===
Pos	Team	Pld	W	D	L	GF	GA	GD	Pts	Qualification
1	(Armenia) Leo	2	2	0	0	7	3	+4	6	Main round
2	(Denmark) JB Gentofte	2	1	0	1	8	7	+1	3	
3	(Montenegro) Titograd (H)	2	0	0	2	5	10	−5	0	

Source: UEFA
Rules for classification: Tiebreakers
(H) Hosts
28 August 2019
20:30

JB Gentofte (Denmark)	6–4	(Montenegro) Titograd
Larsen 17:30; Falck 27:38, 36:02; Jørgensen 28:48; Haagh 30:32; Andersen 39:28	Report	Bajović 2:23; Perošević 6:55; Mugoša 9:34, 22:47

Verde Complex, Podgorica
Referee: Panagiotis Ntalas (Greece), Carl Hughes (Wales)

29 August 2019
20:30

Leo (Armenia)	3–2	(Denmark) JB Gentofte
Francisco De Campos 15:43, 18:38, 23:59	Report	Jørgensen 23:48, 34:48

Verde Complex, Podgorica
Referee: Ivo Tsenov (Bulgaria), Panagiotis Ntalas (Greece)

30 August 2019
20:30

Titograd (Montenegro)	1–4	(Armenia) Leo
Uzunyan 10:28 (o.g.)	Report	Francisco De Campos 17:17; Dos Santos 27:06, 30:31; Mashumyan 38:49

Verde Complex, Podgorica
Referee: Carl Hughes (Wales), Ivo Tsenov (Bulgaria)

== Main round ==
The main round was scheduled to be played between 8 and 13 October 2019.

Times are CEST (UTC+2), as listed by UEFA (local times, if different, are in parentheses).

=== Path A ===
The top three teams of each group in Path A advanced to the elite round.

==== Group 1 ====
Pos	Team	Pld	W	D	L	GF	GA	GD	Pts	Qualification
1	(Portugal) Sporting CP	3	3	0	0	20	1	+19	9	Elite round
2	(Slovenia) Dobovec (H)	3	2	0	1	11	5	+6	6	Elite round
3	(Bosnia and Herzegovina) Mostar	3	0	1	2	3	13	−10	1	Elite round
4	(Serbia) Ekonomac	3	0	1	2	2	17	−15	1	

Source: UEFA
Rules for classification: Tiebreakers
(H) Hosts
9 October 2019
17:30

Sporting CP (Portugal)	5–0	(Bosnia and Herzegovina) Mostar
Pauleta 13:20; Alex 16:24; Cavinato 21:06; Pany Varela 25:11; Cardinal 31:29	Report

Podčetrtek Sports Hall, Podčetrtek
Referee: David Urdánoz Apezteguía (Spain), Jan Kresta (Czech Republic)
9 October 2019
20:00

Ekonomac (Serbia)	0–4	(Slovenia) Dobovec
	Report	Čujec 25:47, 29:25, 34:09; Čeh 30:43

Podčetrtek Sports Hall, Podčetrtek
Referee: Victor Berg-Audic (France), Peter Nurse (England)

10 October 2019
17:30

Ekonomac (Serbia)	1–12	(Portugal) Sporting CP
Vasić 29:19 (pen.)	Report	Taynan 1:43; Erick 2:19, 33:00; Cavinato 4:46, 5:12, 16:21; Cardinal 11:47, 21:38, 22:31; Rocha 18:34, 30:31; Alex Merlim 21:18

Podčetrtek Sports Hall, Podčetrtek
Referee: Jan Kresta (Czech Republic), Victor Berg-Audic (France)
10 October 2019
20:00

Dobovec (Slovenia)	7–2	(Bosnia and Herzegovina) Mostar
Matošević 2:22, 26:12, 29:00; Čujec 15:29; R. Mordej 15:58, 22:42; Fetić 30:44	Report	Vesić 14:06; I. Ivanković 27:36

Podčetrtek Sports Hall, Podčetrtek
Referee: Peter Nurse (England), David Urdánoz Apezteguía (Spain)

12 October 2019
17:30

Mostar (Bosnia and Herzegovina)	1–1	(Serbia) Ekonomac
Aladžić 19:01	Report	Digić 31:15

Podčetrtek Sports Hall, Podčetrtek
Referee: David Urdánoz Apezteguía (Spain), Victor Berg-Audic (France)
12 October 2019
20:00

Dobovec (Slovenia)	0–3	(Portugal) Sporting CP
	Report	João Matos 10:34; Alex 14:36; Cavinato 23:50

Podčetrtek Sports Hall, Podčetrtek
Referee: Jan Kresta (Czech Republic), Peter Nurse (England)

==== Group 2 ====
Pos	Team	Pld	W	D	L	GF	GA	GD	Pts	Qualification
1	(Portugal) Benfica	3	2	1	0	14	3	+11	7	Elite round
2	(Ukraine) Prodexim Kherson	3	2	1	0	16	7	+9	7	Elite round
3	(Belgium) Halle-Gooik (H)	3	1	0	2	10	14	−4	3	Elite round
4	(Azerbaijan) Araz Naxçivan	3	0	0	3	4	20	−16	0	

Source: UEFA
Rules for classification: Tiebreakers
(H) Hosts
9 October 2019
17:30

Benfica (Portugal)	1–1	(Ukraine) Prodexim Kherson
Fernandinho 16:04	Report	Zvarych 23:53

Sportcomplex De Bres, Halle
Referee: Moshe Bohbot (Israel), Viktor Bugenko (Moldova)
9 October 2019
20:30

Araz Naxçivan (Azerbaijan)	1–5	(Belgium) Halle-Gooik
Baghirov 20:24	Report	Gréllo 2:45; Atayev 16:29 (o.g.); Patias 17:57; Tomić 32:36; Carpes 34:03

Sportcomplex De Bres, Halle
Referee: Moshe Bohbot (Israel), Damian Jaruchiewicz (Poland)

10 October 2019
17:30

Araz Naxçivan (Azerbaijan)	0–7	(Portugal) Benfica
	Report	André Coelho 1:57; Ismayilov 5:39 (o.g.); Fits 7:33, 35:20; Chaguinha 31:13, 31:49; Tiago Brito 34:20

Sportcomplex De Bres, Halle
Referee: Damian Jaruchiewicz (Poland), Moshe Bohbot (Israel)
10 October 2019
20:30

Halle-Gooik (Belgium)	3–7	(Ukraine) Prodexim Kherson
Diogo 25:37; Carpes 36:41; Patias 38:28	Report	Roninho 18:52, 19:19; Korsun 23:23, 31:18; Fernandez 30:53; Zvarych 34:01, 39:05

Sportcomplex De Bres, Halle
Referee: Viktor Bugenko (Moldova), Nikola Jelić (Croatia)

12 October 2019
17:30

Prodexim Kherson (Ukraine)	8–3	(Azerbaijan) Araz Naxçivan
Dávid 8:24, 25:44; Korsun 9:43; Lanko 18:30; Shoturma 22:22, 39:24; Bilotserkivets 23:25, 30:01	Report	Zvarych 4:04 (o.g.); Atayev 29:52; Baghirov 39:05

Sportcomplex De Bres, Halle
Referee: Moshe Bohbot (Israel), Damian Jaruchiewicz (Poland)
12 October 2019
20:30

Halle-Gooik (Belgium)	2–6	(Portugal) Benfica
Patias 3:34; Tomić 16:41	Report	Fernandinho 3:17, 6:19; Robinho 4:14; Rafael Henmi 7:53; Fábio Cecílio 14:54, 18:37

Sportcomplex De Bres, Halle
Referee: Nikola Jelić (Croatia), Viktor Bugenko (Moldova)

==== Group 3 ====
Pos	Team	Pld	W	D	L	GF	GA	GD	Pts	Qualification
1	(Spain) Barcelona	3	3	0	0	16	1	+15	9	Elite round
2	(Russia) Tyumen	3	2	0	1	12	6	+6	6	Elite round
3	(Kazakhstan) Ayat	3	1	0	2	9	19	−10	3	Elite round
4	(Lithuania) Vytis (H)	3	0	0	3	6	17	−11	0	

Source: UEFA
Rules for classification: Tiebreakers
(H) Hosts
8 October 2019
15:30 (16:30 EEST)

Barcelona (Spain)	1–0	(Russia) Tyumen
Marcênio 6:47	Report

Jonava Sports Arena, Jonava
Referee: Trayan Enchev (Bulgaria), Filipe Gonçalo Santos Duarte (Portugal)
8 October 2019
18:00 (19:00 EEST)

Ayat (Kazakhstan)	5–4	(Lithuania) Vytis
Matheus Preá 8:14, 24:21, 34:13; Hebberth Bolt 14:54; Valiullin 17:01	Report	Juchno 7:30; Leandro 23:58, 38:43; Rafa 35:34 (pen.)

Jonava Sports Arena, Jonava
Referee: Alessandro Malfer (Italy), Ozan Soykan (Turkey)

9 October 2019
15:30 (16:30 EEST)

Ayat (Kazakhstan)	1–7	(Spain) Barcelona
Ryndin 39:33	Report	Adolfo 5:15, 39:12; Daniel Shiraishi 10:53, 16:40, 27:56; Joselito 14:50; Didac Plana 35:58

Jonava Sports Arena, Jonava
Referee: Ozan Soykan (Turkey), Trayan Enchev (Bulgaria)
9 October 2019
18:00 (19:00 EEST)

Vytis (Lithuania)	2–4	(Russia) Tyumen
Leandro 29:15; Isaac 38:25	Report	Bruno Taffy 1:52, 10:35; Batyrev 33:29; Loginov 37:48

Jonava Sports Arena, Jonava
Referee: Filipe Gonçalo Santos Duarte (Portugal), Alessandro Malfer (Italy)

11 October 2019
15:30 (16:30 EEST)

Tyumen (Russia)	8–3	(Kazakhstan) Ayat
Krikun 3:38; Antoshkin 7:01; Gereykhanov 11:45; Vilian Lourenço 31:06, 37:07; Emelyanov 31:26; Upalev 37:33; Bakhur 39:59	Report	Valiullin 6:12, 16:03; Hebberth Bolt 22:59

Jonava Sports Arena, Jonava
Referee: Filipe Gonçalo Santos Duarte (Portugal), Ozan Soykan (Turkey)
11 October 2019
18:00 (19:00 EEST)

Vytis (Lithuania)	0–8	(Spain) Barcelona
	Report	Rivillos 1:41, 28:45; Povill 5:36, 37:54; Daniel Shiraishi 6:04; Arthur 22:20; Marcênio 29:03; Roger 36:20

Jonava Sports Arena, Jonava
Referee: Alessandro Malfer (Italy), Trayan Enchev (Bulgaria)

==== Group 4 ====
Pos	Team	Pld	W	D	L	GF	GA	GD	Pts	Qualification
1	(Russia) KPRF	3	3	0	0	14	6	+8	9	Elite round
2	(Spain) ElPozo	3	2	0	1	13	8	+5	6	Elite round
3	(Kazakhstan) Kairat	3	1	0	2	5	6	−1	3	Elite round
4	(Hungary) MVFC Berettyóújfalu (H)	3	0	0	3	1	13	−12	0	

Source: UEFA
Rules for classification: Tiebreakers
(H) Hosts
8 October 2019
15:45

Kairat (Kazakhstan)	0–3	(Russia) KPRF
	Report	Saiotti 2:25; Razuvanov 10:56; Asadov 16:46

Pálfi István Rendezvénycsarnok, Berettyóújfalu
Referee: Nicola Manzione (Italy), Daniel Matkovic (Switzerland)
8 October 2019
18:00

ElPozo (Spain)	5–0	(Hungary) MVFC Berettyóújfalu
Fernan 4:06; Felipe Paradynski 10:19, 34:41, 35:26; Felipe Valério 28:01	Report

Pálfi István Rendezvénycsarnok, Berettyóújfalu
Referee: Timo Onatsu (Finland), Veljko Bošković (Montenegro)

9 October 2019
15:45

ElPozo (Spain)	3–2	(Kazakhstan) Kairat
Felipe Paradynski 13:34; Alex 21:01; Felipe Valério 35:27	Report	Douglas Júnior 13:21; Higuita 29:17

Pálfi István Rendezvénycsarnok, Berettyóújfalu
Referee: Veljko Bošković (Montenegro), Nicola Manzione (Italy)
9 October 2019
18:00

MVFC Berettyóújfalu (Hungary)	1–5	(Russia) KPRF
Henrique Da Silva 21:14	Report	Asadov 13:57, 32:45; Saiotti 17:21, 39:29; Castanhassi 39:13

Pálfi István Rendezvénycsarnok, Berettyóújfalu
Referee: Daniel Matkovic (Switzerland), Timo Onatsu (Finland)

11 October 2019
15:45

KPRF (Russia)	6–5	(Spain) ElPozo
Bagirov 2:15; Razorenov 13:48; Castanhassi 24:10, 34:43, 37:49; Niyazov 39:06	Report	Felipe Paradynski 27:15; Felipe Valério 33:17, 39:32; Rômulo 33:42 (o.g.); Pol 38:15

Pálfi István Rendezvénycsarnok, Berettyóújfalu
Referee: Nicola Manzione (Italy), Veljko Bošković (Montenegro)
11 October 2019
18:00

MVFC Berettyóújfalu (Hungary)	0–3	(Kazakhstan) Kairat
	Report	Luizinho 3:28, 28:41; Gabriel 13:08

Pálfi István Rendezvénycsarnok, Berettyóújfalu
Referee: Daniel Matkovic (Switzerland), Timo Onatsu (Finland)

=== Path B ===
The winners of each group in Path B advanced to the elite round.

==== Group 5 ====
Pos	Team	Pld	W	D	L	GF	GA	GD	Pts	Qualification
1	(Czech Republic) Sparta Praha (H)	3	3	0	0	16	5	+11	9	Elite round
2	(Romania) Miercurea Ciuc	3	1	1	1	7	10	−3	4	
3	(Poland) Rekord Bielsko-Biała	3	1	0	2	5	7	−2	3	
4	(Malta) Luxol St Andrews	3	0	1	2	4	10	−6	1	

Source: UEFA
Rules for classification: Tiebreakers
(H) Hosts
10 October 2019
17:30

Rekord Bielsko-Biała (Poland)	3–1	(Malta) Luxol St Andrews Futsal Club
Alex Viana 12:12; Bondar 32:43; Budniak 39:06	Report	Maikinho 26:02

Arena Sparta, Prague
Referee: Stefan Vrijens (Belgium), Ibrahim El Jilali (Netherlands)
10 October 2019
20:00

Miercurea Ciuc (Romania)	3–7	(Czech Republic) Sparta Praha
Hector 34:49; Rakić 37:26; F. Matei 38:35 (pen.)	Report	Grbeša 2:20; Seidler 16:34; Drahovský 16:59; Novak 22:45, 32:01; Rick 24:00; Wilde 35:03

Arena Sparta, Prague
Referee: Alejandro Martinez Flores (Spain), David Grøndal Nissen (Denmark)

11 October 2019
17:30

Miercurea Ciuc (Romania)	2–1	(Poland) Rekord Bielsko-Biała
F. Matei 1:58; Alvarito 36:11	Report	Marek 27:08

Arena Sparta, Prague
Referee: David Grøndal Nissen (Denmark), Stefan Vrijens (Belgium)
11 October 2019
20:00

Sparta Praha (Czech Republic)	5–1	(Malta) Luxol St Andrews Futsal Club
Drahovský 13:33; A. Brahimi 21:58; Wilde 25:55; Novak 30:27 (pen.); Seidler 32:24	Report	Pereira De Souza 29:16

Arena Sparta, Prague
Referee: Ibrahim El Jilali (Netherlands), Alejandro Martinez Flores (Spain)

13 October 2019
17:30

Luxol St Andrews Futsal Club (Malta)	2–2	(Romania) Miercurea Ciuc
Sant' Anna Coriolano 2:20; Vevé 14:20	Report	Savio Valadares 10:22; Alvarito 18:39

Arena Sparta, Prague
Referee: Stefan Vrijens (Belgium), Ibrahim El Jilali (Netherlands)
13 October 2019
20:00

Sparta Praha (Czech Republic)	4–1	(Poland) Rekord Bielsko-Biała
Grbeša 1:29; Seidler 8:54; Amadeu 24:49; Drahovský 39:48	Report	Bondar 20:38

Arena Sparta, Prague
Referee: Alejandro Martinez Flores (Spain), David Grøndal Nissen (Denmark)

==== Group 6 ====
Pos	Team	Pld	W	D	L	GF	GA	GD	Pts	Qualification
1	(Croatia) Novo Vrijeme (H)	3	3	0	0	14	7	+7	9	Elite round
2	(Armenia) Leo	3	2	0	1	16	12	+4	6	
3	(North Macedonia) Shkupi	3	1	0	2	11	15	−4	3	
4	(Cyprus) Omonia	3	0	0	3	11	18	−7	0	

Source: UEFA
Rules for classification: Tiebreakers
(H) Hosts
8 October 2019
18:00

Shkupi (North Macedonia)	2–7	(Armenia) Leo
Uzunyan 18:45 (o.g.); Alimi 36:13	Report	Pocaia 2:57, 32:52; Alves Dos Santos Junior 8:46, 13:17, 37:48; Martins De Souza 14:35; De Liz Mota 39:08

Gradski Sportski Centar Makarska, Makarska
Referee: Petar Radojčić (Serbia), Vlad Nicolae Ciobanu (Romania)
8 October 2019
20:30

Omonia (Cyprus)	2–5	(Croatia) Novo Vrijeme
Mantelli 32:07 (2pen.), 35:36	Report	Fideršek 16:04, 16:22; De Santana Brito 25:40, 30:36; Horvath 33:35

Gradski Sportski Centar Makarska, Makarska
Referee: Cédric Pelissier (France), Aleš Močnik Perič (Slovenia)

9 October 2019
18:00

Omonia (Cyprus)	4–7	(North Macedonia) Shkupi
Mantelli 5:11, 5:45, 23:40 (pen.); Manoli 29:39	Report	Seferi 2:44, 32:34; Leveski 17:36, 22:14; Alimi 17:49; Sulejman 30:39; Dimovski 36:51

Gradski Sportski Centar Makarska, Makarska
Referee: Vlad Nicolae Ciobanu (Romania), Cédric Pelissier (France)
9 October 2019
20:30

Novo Vrijeme (Croatia)	5–3	(Armenia) Leo
Kazazić 6:08; Bajrušović 21:44; Osredkar 24:10, 37:18, 39:59	Report	Francisco De Campos 4:19, 28:54; De Liz Mota 39:53

Gradski Sportski Centar Makarska, Makarska
Referee: Aleš Močnik Perič (Slovenia), Petar Radojčić (Serbia)

11 October 2019
18:00

Leo (Armenia)	6–5	(Cyprus) Omonia
Pocaia 8:00; Alves Dos Santos Junior 18:10, 38:25; De Liz Mota 26:44; Dos Santos 32:44; Mkrtchyan 38:41	Report	Mantelli 9:04, 9:36, 23:14; Duio 15:38 (o.g.); Lakoufis 39:13

Gradski Sportski Centar Makarska, Makarska
Referee: Petar Radojčić (Serbia), Vlad Nicolae Ciobanu (Romania)
11 October 2019
20:30

Novo Vrijeme (Croatia)	4–2	(North Macedonia) Shkupi
Osredkar 6:12; Babić 15:25, 31:05; Musinov 27:36	Report	Gligorov 17:23; Leveski 39:24

Gradski Sportski Centar Makarska, Makarska
Referee: Cédric Pelissier (France), Aleš Močnik Perič (Slovenia)

==== Group 7 ====
Pos	Team	Pld	W	D	L	GF	GA	GD	Pts	Qualification
1	(Belarus) Stalitsa Minsk (H)	3	2	1	0	13	3	+10	7	Elite round
2	(France) Toulon Élite	3	1	1	1	11	9	+2	4	
3	(Kosovo) Liburni	3	0	3	0	9	9	0	3	
4	(Netherlands) Hovocubo	3	0	1	2	5	17	−12	1	

Source: UEFA
Rules for classification: Tiebreakers
(H) Hosts
9 October 2019
16:00 (17:00 FET)

Liburni (Kosovo)	5–5	(France) Toulon Élite
Qerimi 3:31, 39:12; Alaj 13:56; Selmanaj 29:22; Selimi 32:14	Report	Jouad 2:35; Gutierrez Ojeda 2:59; Pupa 17:54; Diaz 21:53; Sanz Sendon 29:48

Sports Hall SCA, Minsk
Referee: Eduardo Fernandes Coelho (Portugal), Lukáš Peško (Slovakia)
9 October 2019
18:30 (19:30 FET)

Hovocubo (Netherlands)	1–9	(Belarus) Stalitsa Minsk
Darri 34:21	Report	Lazyuk 5:24; Rogovik 12:25, 14:35, 28:36, 39:32; Mykola Grytsyna 22:57; Gorbenko 27:07; Zhigalko 35:34; Olshevski 36:08

Sports Hall SCA, Minsk
Referee: Kirill Naishouler (Finland), Yasin Alageyik (Belgium)

10 October 2019
16:00 (17:00 FET)

Hovocubo (Netherlands)	3–3	(Kosovo) Liburni
Attahiri 12:45; Amrani 25:51; Bouyouzan 28:47	Report	Kryeziu 17:42; Alaj 30:18, 37:58

Sports Hall SCA, Minsk
Referee: Yasin Alageyik (Belgium), Eduardo Fernandes Coelho (Portugal)
10 October 2019
18:30 (19:30 FET)

Stalitsa Minsk (Belarus)	3–1	(France) Toulon Élite
Gorbenko 8:17, 36:56; Mykola Grytsyna 30:29	Report	Jouad 10:20

Sports Hall SCA, Minsk
Referee: Lukáš Peško (Slovakia), Kirill Naishouler (Finland)

12 October 2019
11:00 (12:00 FET)

Toulon Élite (France)	5–1	(Netherlands) Hovocubo
Gutierrez Ojeda 19:55; Sampaio Santos 26:01; Ouadi 36:09, 37:37, 38:09	Report	Bouyouzan 24:49

Sports Hall SCA, Minsk
Referee: Kirill Naishouler (Finland), Lukáš Peško (Slovakia)
12 October 2019
13:30 (14:30 FET)

Stalitsa Minsk (Belarus)	1–1	(Kosovo) Liburni
Zhigalko 5:16	Report	Qerimi 14:03

Sports Hall SCA, Minsk
Referee: Eduardo Fernandes Coelho (Portugal), Yasin Alageyik (Belgium)

==== Group 8 ====
Pos	Team	Pld	W	D	L	GF	GA	GD	Pts	Qualification
1	(Italy) Italservice Pesaro	3	3	0	0	13	5	+8	9	Elite round
2	(Georgia (country)) Georgians Tbilisi	3	2	0	1	11	9	+2	6	
3	(Germany) TSV Weilimdorf	3	1	0	2	9	11	−2	3	
4	(Sweden) Uddevalla (H)	3	0	0	3	3	11	−8	0	

Source: UEFA
Rules for classification: Tiebreakers
(H) Hosts
9 October 2019
17:00

Italservice Pesaro (Italy)	5–3	(Germany) TSV Weilimdorf
Marcelinho 4:50; Fortini 11:17; Borruto 17:24; Taborda 29:22; Canal 39:43	Report	Delić 17:35 (2pen.), 17:52; Bozinovic 19:56

Agnebergshallen, Uddevalla
Referee: Balázs Farkas (Hungary), Vasilios Christodoulis (Greece)
9 October 2019
19:30

Georgians Tbilisi (Georgia (country))	4–2	(Sweden) Uddevalla
Lukava 5:40; Tophuria 30:09, 33:56; Kurtanidze 32:16	Report	Al Mouti 14:20; Söderqvist 29:51

Agnebergshallen, Uddevalla
Referee: Javier Moreno Reina (Spain), Juan Boelen (Belgium)

10 October 2019
17:00

Georgians Tbilisi (Georgia (country))	1–5	(Italy) Italservice Pesaro
Kurtanidze 29:24	Report	Marcelinho 5:47, 8:33; Júlio de Oliveira 13:58; Fortini 30:10; Salas 37:03

Agnebergshallen, Uddevalla
Referee: Juan Boelen (Belgium), Balázs Farkas (Hungary)
10 October 2019
19:30

Uddevalla (Sweden)	0–4	(Germany) TSV Weilimdorf
	Report	Sipahi 7:57; Fischer 10:08, 24:26; Delić 14:02 (2pen.)

Agnebergshallen, Uddevalla
Referee: Vasilios Christodoulis (Greece), Javier Moreno Reina (Spain)

12 October 2019
14:00

TSV Weilimdorf (Germany)	2–6	(Georgia (country)) Georgians Tbilisi
Delić 18:16 (2pen.); Despotović 35:18	Report	Tskhomaria 14:33 (2pen.); Giorgaia 19:38; Todua 20:45, 30:58; Сhumburidze 38:58; Tophuria 39:41

Agnebergshallen, Uddevalla
Referee: Juan Boelen (Belgium), Vasilios Christodoulis (Greece)
12 October 2019
16:30

Uddevalla (Sweden)	1–3	(Italy) Italservice Pesaro
Raisi 14:09	Report	Canal 2:06; Marcelinho 4:12; Honorio 18:23

Agnebergshallen, Uddevalla
Referee: Javier Moreno Reina (Spain), Balázs Farkas (Hungary)

== Elite round ==
The draw for the elite round was held on 18 October 2019, 14:00 CEST (UTC+2), at the UEFA Headquarters in Nyon, Switzerland. The 16 teams were drawn into four groups of four, containing one Path A group winners (seeding position 1), one Path A group runners-up (seeding position 2), and two teams which were either Path A group third-placed teams or Path B group winners (seeding positions 3 or 4). First, the seven teams which were potential hosts were drawn from their own designated pot and allocated to their respective group as per their seeding positions, with the first four teams drawn selected as hosts. Next, the remaining nine teams were drawn from their respective pot which were allocated according to their seeding positions (teams, including potential hosts, which were neither Path A group winners nor runners-up were allocated to first seeding position 4, then seeding position 3). Winners and runners-up from the same Path A group could not be drawn in the same group, but third-placed teams could be drawn in the same group as winners or runners-up from the same Path A group. Teams from the same association could be drawn in the same group. Based on the decisions taken by the UEFA Emergency Panel, teams from Russia and Ukraine could not be drawn in the same group.

Legend

- (H): Elite round hosts selected by draw
- (h): Potential elite round hosts not selected by draw

Advanced from main round Path A
Group	Winners	Runners-up	Third-placed teams
Seed	Seeding position 1	Seeding position 2	Seeding position 3 or 4
1	(Portugal) Sporting CP (h)	(Slovenia) Dobovec	(Bosnia and Herzegovina) Mostar
2	(Portugal) Benfica (h)	(Ukraine) Prodexim Kherson	(Belgium) Halle-Gooik
3	(Spain) Barcelona	(Russia) Tyumen (H)	(Kazakhstan) Ayat
4	(Russia) KPRF (H)	(Spain) ElPozo (h)	(Kazakhstan) Kairat (H)

Advanced from main round Path B
Group	Winners
Seed	Seeding position 3 or 4
5	(Czech Republic) Sparta Praha
6	(Croatia) Novo Vrijeme
7	(Belarus) Stalitsa Minsk (H)
8	(Italy) Italservice Pesaro

The winners of each group advanced to the final tournament. The elite round was scheduled to be played between 19 and 24 November 2019.

Times are CET (UTC+1), as listed by UEFA (local times, if different, are in parentheses).

=== Group A ===
Pos	Team	Pld	W	D	L	GF	GA	GD	Pts	Qualification
1	(Russia) KPRF (H)	3	3	0	0	14	5	+9	9	Final tournament
2	(Slovenia) Dobovec	3	2	0	1	11	7	+4	6	
3	(Belgium) Halle-Gooik	3	1	0	2	10	8	+2	3	
4	(Bosnia and Herzegovina) Mostar	3	0	0	3	6	21	−15	0	

Source: UEFA
Rules for classification: Tiebreakers
(H) Hosts
19 November 2019
14:45 (16:45 MSK)

Dobovec (Slovenia)	3–1	(Belgium) Halle-Gooik
Turk 32:53; Diogo 37:50 (o.g.); Čujec 39:58	Report	Carpes 4:56

Universal Sports Hall CSKA, Moscow
Referee: Eduardo Fernandes Coelho (Portugal), Miguel Castilho (Portugal)
19 November 2019
17:30 (19:30 MSK)

KPRF (Russia)	7–2	(Bosnia and Herzegovina) Mostar
Niyazov 7:25; Castanhassi 10:51; Bagirov 14:10, 21:33, 35:39; Lin 16:14; Ponkratov 39:39	Report	Vesić 26:36; Lazarević 34:45

Universal Sports Hall CSKA, Moscow
Referee: Marc Birkett (England), Kamil Çetin (Turkey)

20 November 2019
14:45 (16:45 MSK)

Mostar (Bosnia and Herzegovina)	1–6	(Slovenia) Dobovec
Vesić 35:40	Report	Čeh 1:13, 10:57; Matošević 3:34, 30:15; Čujec 34:31; Vesić 34:53 (o.g.)

Universal Sports Hall CSKA, Moscow
Referee: Miguel Castilho (Portugal), Eduardo Fernandes Coelho (Portugal)
20 November 2019
17:45 (19:45 MSK)

KPRF (Russia)	2–1	(Belgium) Halle-Gooik
Fukin 15:34; Rômulo 25:45	Report	Dujacquier 14:01

Universal Sports Hall CSKA, Moscow
Referee: Kamil Çetin (Turkey), Marc Birkett (England)

22 November 2019
14:45 (16:45 MSK)

Halle-Gooik (Belgium)	8–3	(Bosnia and Herzegovina) Mostar
Gréllo 8:23; Leo 13:13, 33:16; Patias 17:53; Teixeira 21:35; Diogo 24:39; Tomić 32:58, 33:51	Report	Aladžić 6:06; I. Ivanković 7:37; Gosto 8:34

Universal Sports Hall CSKA, Moscow
Referee: Marc Birkett (England), Kamil Çetin (Turkey)
22 November 2019
17:45 (19:45 MSK)

Dobovec (Slovenia)	2–5	(Russia) KPRF
Čeh 6:11; Matošević 16:31	Report	Niyazov 8:56; Castanhassi 21:31; Bagirov 32:09; Burkov 37:12; Lin 39:13

Universal Sports Hall CSKA, Moscow
Referee: Eduardo Fernandes Coelho (Portugal), Miguel Castilho (Portugal)

=== Group B ===
Pos	Team	Pld	W	D	L	GF	GA	GD	Pts	Qualification
1	(Russia) Tyumen (H)	3	2	1	0	9	4	+5	7	Final tournament
2	(Portugal) Sporting CP	3	2	0	1	10	5	+5	6	
3	(Croatia) Novo Vrijeme	3	1	1	1	6	9	−3	4	
4	(Kazakhstan) Ayat	3	0	0	3	4	11	−7	0	

Source: UEFA
Rules for classification: Tiebreakers
(H) Hosts
21 November 2019
12:00 (16:00 YEKT)

Sporting CP (Portugal)	4–0	(Croatia) Novo Vrijeme
Alex 0:29; Pany Varela 7:33; Leo 21:33; Pauleta 21:48	Report

Sports Palace Tyumen, Tyumen
Referee: Juan José Cordero Gallardo (Spain), Alejandro Martinez Flores (Spain)
21 November 2019
15:00 (19:00 YEKT)

Tyumen (Russia)	3–0	(Kazakhstan) Ayat
Antoshkin 6:12, 37:07; Bruno Taffy 22:31	Report

Sports Palace Tyumen, Tyumen
Referee: Borislav Kolev (Bulgaria), Admir Zahović (Slovenia)

22 November 2019
12:00 (16:00 YEKT)

Ayat (Kazakhstan)	2–5	(Portugal) Sporting CP
Lopatyuk 0:28; Matheus Preá 32:57	Report	Cavinato 6:12; Alex Merlim 8:02; Alex 19:47; Cardinal 22:29, 38:38

Sports Palace Tyumen, Tyumen
Referee: Alejandro Martinez Flores (Spain), Juan José Cordero Gallardo (Spain)
22 November 2019
15:00 (19:00 YEKT)

Tyumen (Russia)	3–3	(Croatia) Novo Vrijeme
Antoshkin 7:21, 28:24; Bruno Taffy 8:15	Report	Osredkar 9:46; Fideršek 17:14, 32:57

Sports Palace Tyumen, Tyumen
Referee: Admir Zahović (Slovenia), Borislav Kolev (Bulgaria)

24 November 2019
11:00 (15:00 YEKT)

Novo Vrijeme (Croatia)	3–2	(Kazakhstan) Ayat
Musinov 17:30; Fideršek 35:22; Alves Carneiro Da Silva 38:16	Report	Agapov 1:42; Matheus Preá 30:22

Sports Palace Tyumen, Tyumen
Referee: Alejandro Martinez Flores (Spain), Admir Zahović (Slovenia)
24 November 2019
14:00 (18:00 YEKT)

Sporting CP (Portugal)	1–3	(Russia) Tyumen
Alex Merlim 18:56	Report	Lobkov 0:27; Batyrev 8:34; Antoshkin 26:02

Sports Palace Tyumen, Tyumen
Referee: Juan José Cordero Gallardo (Spain), Borislav Kolev (Bulgaria)

=== Group C ===
Pos	Team	Pld	W	D	L	GF	GA	GD	Pts	Qualification
1	(Spain) ElPozo	3	2	1	0	11	6	+5	7	Final tournament
2	(Italy) Italservice Pesaro	3	1	1	1	11	9	+2	4	
3	(Portugal) Benfica	3	1	0	2	8	12	−4	3 (Note: Ranked on head-to-head points: Benfica 3, Kairat 0.)	
4	(Kazakhstan) Kairat (H)	3	1	0	2	9	12	−3	3	

Source: UEFA
Rules for classification: Tiebreakers
(H) Hosts
Notes:
21 November 2019
11:30 (16:30 ALMT)

Benfica (Portugal)	1–5	(Italy) Italservice Pesaro
Robinho 29:14	Report	Borruto 11:11; Canal 33:56; Taborda 38:26, 39:13; Marcelinho 38:48

Baluan Sholak Sports Palace, Almaty
Referee: Ondřej Černý (Czech Republic), Cédric Pelissier (France)
21 November 2019
14:00 (19:00 ALMT)

Kairat (Kazakhstan)	1–4	(Spain) ElPozo
Luizinho 27:36	Report	Fernan 18:43; Matteus 33:49; Álex 35:57; Alberto 36:36

Baluan Sholak Sports Palace, Almaty
Referee: Saša Tomić (Croatia), Nikola Jelić (Croatia)

22 November 2019
11:30 (16:30 ALMT)

ElPozo (Spain)	4–2	(Portugal) Benfica
Matteus 9:20; Felipe Paradynski 10:52; Pol 12:02; Andresito 13:49	Report	Chaguinha 6:37; Fernandinho 38:51

Baluan Sholak Sports Palace, Almaty
Referee: Nikola Jelić (Croatia), Saša Tomić (Croatia)
22 November 2019
14:00 (19:00 ALMT)

Kairat (Kazakhstan)	5–3	(Italy) Italservice Pesaro
Edson 4:35, 26:46; Tonidandel 27:24 (o.g.); Luizinho 28:53; Orazov 39:55	Report	Tonidandel 9:18; Honorio 9:35; Júlio de Oliveira 21:51

Baluan Sholak Sports Palace, Almaty
Referee: Cédric Pelissier (France), Ondřej Černý (Czech Republic)

24 November 2019
10:30 (15:30 ALMT)

Italservice Pesaro (Italy)	3–3	(Spain) ElPozo
Salas 4:53; Andresito 30:51 (o.g.); Honorio 35:15	Report	Felipe Paradynski 31:12; Pol 37:16; Fernan 37:56

Baluan Sholak Sports Palace, Almaty
Referee: Nikola Jelić (Croatia), Ondřej Černý (Czech Republic)
24 November 2019
13:00 (18:00 ALMT)

Benfica (Portugal)	5–3	(Kazakhstan) Kairat
Bruno Coelho 1:11, 27:52; Chaguinha 16:30; Robinho 37:33; André Sousa 38:43	Report	Douglas Junior 5:01 (pen.), 9:43; Tayebi 24:26

Baluan Sholak Sports Palace, Almaty
Referee: Saša Tomić (Croatia), Cédric Pelissier (France)

=== Group D ===
Pos	Team	Pld	W	D	L	GF	GA	GD	Pts	Qualification
1	(Spain) Barcelona	3	3	0	0	12	4	+8	9	Final tournament
2	(Ukraine) Prodexim Kherson	3	2	0	1	9	7	+2	6	
3	(Czech Republic) Sparta Praha	3	1	0	2	7	9	−2	3	
4	(Belarus) Stalitsa Minsk (H)	3	0	0	3	4	12	−8	0	

Source: UEFA
Rules for classification: Tiebreakers
(H) Hosts
20 November 2019
15:00 (17:00 FET)

Barcelona (Spain)	2–1	(Czech Republic) Sparta Praha
Dyego 19:32; Aicardo 26:45	Report	Drahovský 2:48

Sports Hall SCA, Minsk
Referee: Angelo Galante (Italy), Alessandro Malfer (Italy)
20 November 2019
17:30 (19:30 FET)

Stalitsa Minsk (Belarus)	1–2	(Ukraine) Prodexim Kherson
Zhigalko 36:36	Report	Dávid 15:56; Volianiuk 35:35

Sports Hall SCA, Minsk
Referee: Gábor Kovács (Hungary), Balázs Farkas (Hungary)

21 November 2019
15:00 (17:00 FET)

Prodexim Kherson (Ukraine)	2–4	(Spain) Barcelona
Roninho 1:32; Zvarych 31:08	Report	Dyego 3:00; Ferrão 7:52; Daniel Shiraishi 28:40; Lozano 40:00

Sports Hall SCA, Minsk
Referee: Balázs Farkas (Hungary), Gábor Kovács (Hungary)
21 November 2019
17:30 (19:30 FET)

Stalitsa Minsk (Belarus)	2–4	(Czech Republic) Sparta Praha
Rogovik 14:32 (pen.); Zhigalko 36:25	Report	Wilde 7:23; Drahovský 12:59, 39:45 (2pen.); Amadeu 29:25

Sports Hall SCA, Minsk
Referee: Alessandro Malfer (Italy), Angelo Galante (Italy)

23 November 2019
10:00 (12:00 FET)

Sparta Praha (Czech Republic)	2–5	(Ukraine) Prodexim Kherson
Drahovský 1:12; Rick 18:07	Report	Volianiuk 0:53, 36:40; Shoturma 5:08; Zvarych 37:49, 38:52

Sports Hall SCA, Minsk
Referee: Alessandro Malfer (Italy), Gábor Kovács (Hungary)
23 November 2019
12:30 (14:30 FET)

Barcelona (Spain)	6–1	(Belarus) Stalitsa Minsk
Aicardo 2:10; Rivillos 8:22, 33:22, 36:58; Roger 10:15; Lozano 39:09	Report	Pessoa Dos Santos 19:14

Sports Hall SCA, Minsk
Referee: Angelo Galante (Italy), Balázs Farkas (Hungary)

== Final tournament ==
The final tournament, originally scheduled to be played on 24 and 26 April 2020 at the Minsk Arena, Minsk, was postponed due to concerns over the COVID-19 pandemic in Europe. It was rescheduled to be played on 9 and 11 October 2020 at the Palau Blaugrana, Barcelona.

=== Venue ===
The original hosts venue of the final tournament was selected at the UEFA Executive Committee meeting in Nyon, Switzerland on 4 December 2019, with the Minsk Arena in Minsk, Belarus appointed. This would have been the first time that the final tournament would be held at a neutral venue instead of in the country of one of the four qualified teams.

On 17 June 2020, the UEFA Executive Committee chose to relocate the 2020 finals to Palau Blaugrana, Barcelona, Spain due to the COVID-19 pandemic in Europe, and Minsk were instead chosen to host the finals of the 2020–21 UEFA Futsal Champions League in April 2021.

=== Qualified teams ===
The following four teams qualified for the final tournament.

In the following table, final tournaments until 2018 were in the Futsal Cup era, since 2019 were in the UEFA Futsal Champions League era. Only final tournaments in four-team format starting from 2007 are shown.

Group	Winners	Previous final tournament appearances (bold indicates winners)
A	(Russia) KPRF	None
B	(Russia) Tyumen	None
C	(Spain) ElPozo	2 (2007, 2008)
D	(Spain) Barcelona (hosts)	6 (**2012**, 2013, **2014**, 2015, 2018, 2019)

=== Final draw ===
The draw for the final tournament was held on 5 February 2020, 19:00 FET (UTC+3), by Aleksandr Hleb at the Belarus Olympic Committee headquarters in Minsk. The four teams were drawn into two semi-finals without any restrictions.

=== Bracket ===
In the semi-finals and final, extra time and penalty shoot-out are used to decide the winner if necessary; however, no extra time is used in the third place match (Regulations Article 17.01 and 17.02).

Semi-finals
9 October – Barcelona
**(Spain) Barcelona (p)**	**3 (5)**
(Russia) KPRF	3 (4)
9 October – Barcelona
**(Spain) ElPozo**	**2**
(Russia) Tyumen	1

Final
11 October – Barcelona
**(Spain) Barcelona**	**2**
(Spain) ElPozo	1
Third place match
11 October – Barcelona
**(Russia) KPRF (p)**	**2 (3)**
(Russia) Tyumen	2 (1)

Times are CEST (UTC+2), as listed by UEFA.

=== Semi-finals ===
9 October 2020
16:00

ElPozo (Spain)	2–1	(Russia) Tyumen
Rafa 14:45; Alberto García 31:36	Report	Abramovich 23:46

Palau Blaugrana, Barcelona
Attendance: 0
Referee: Ondřej Černý (Czech Republic), Borislav Kolev (Bulgaria)

9 October 2020
21:00

Barcelona (Spain)	3–3 (a.e.t.)	(Russia) KPRF
Lozano 6:01; Ferrão 7:51; Esquerdinha 42:45	Report	Rômulo 19:59; Asadov 29:12; Nando 49:49 (p)
Penalties
Ferrão (penalty scored); Daniel Japonês (penalty scored); Esquerdinha (penalty scored); Dyego (penalty scored); Lozano (penalty scored)	5–4	(penalty scored) Nando; (penalty missed) Lin; (penalty scored) Saiotti; (penalty scored) Rômulo; (penalty scored) Asadov

Palau Blaugrana, Barcelona
Attendance: 0
Referee: Angelo Galante (Italy), Nicola Manzione (Italy)

=== Third place match ===
11 October 2020
16:00

KPRF (Russia)	2–2	(Russia) Tyumen
Niyazov 34:02; Asadov 39:52	Report	Bruno Taffy 17:07; Milovanov 37:01
Penalties
Nando (penalty scored); Rômulo (penalty scored); Saiotti (penalty missed); Lin (penalty scored)	3–1	(penalty missed) Milovanov; (penalty missed) Lourenço; (penalty scored) Abramovich; (penalty missed) Bruno Taffy

Palau Blaugrana, Barcelona
Attendance: 0
Referee: Eduardo Fernandes Coelho (Portugal), Borislav Kolev (Bulgaria)

=== Final ===
11 October 2020
20:00

Barcelona (Spain)	2–1	(Spain) ElPozo
Dyego 3:10; Aicardo 8:28	Report	Leo Santana 24:52

Palau Blaugrana, Barcelona
Attendance: 0
Referee: Saša Tomić (Croatia), Nikola Jelić (Croatia)

== Top goalscorers ==
- Preliminary round: There were 385 goals scored in 48 matches, for an average of 8.02 goals per match.
- Main round: There were 314 goals scored in 48 matches, for an average of 6.54 goals per match.
- Elite round: There were 141 goals scored in 24 matches, for an average of 5.88 goals per match.
- Final tournament: There were 16 goals scored in 4 matches, for an average of 4 goals per match.

— Team eliminated / inactive for this stage.

Rank	Player	Team	PR	MR	ER	FT	Total
1	(Brazil) Renan Roberto Mantelli	(Cyprus) Omonia	8	8	—	—	16
2	(Czech Republic) Tomáš Drahovský	(Czech Republic) Sparta Praha	—	3	4	—	7
2	(Brazil) Felipe Paradynski	(Spain) ElPozo	—	5	2	0	7
2	(Cape Verde) Nilton Tavares De Pina	(France) Toulon Élite	7	0	—	—	7
