= 2022 Copa América de Futsal squads =

The 2022 Copa América de Futsal was an international futsal tournament held in Asunción, Paraguay from 29 January to 6 February 2021. The ten national teams involved in the tournament were required to register a squad of a minimum of 10 and up to 14 players, including at least two goalkeepers. Only players in these squads were eligible to take part in the tournament.

Each national team had to register its list of up to fourteen players in the COMET system and then submit it to CONMEBOL by 7 January 2022, 18:00 PYST (UTC−3) (Regulations Article 29). Teams are only permitted to make replacements in cases of serious injuries up to 48 hours before the start of the tournament (Regulations Article 31). Teams are also permitted to replace an injured goalkeeper with another at any time during the tournament (Regulations Article 32). In addition, any player with positive PCR tests for SARS-CoV-2 may be replaced at any moment before and during the tournament (Regulations Article 34). All the substitutions must have the approval of the CONMEBOL Medical Commission.

CONMEBOL published the lists of the 10 national teams on 14 January 2022.

The age listed for each player is as of 29 January 2022, the first day of the tournament. A flag is included for coaches who are of a different nationality than their own national team.

== Group A ==
=== Brazil ===
Brazil announced a preliminary squad of 15 players on 10 January 2021. The final squad of 14 players was announced on 13 January 2022. Defender Rangel and winger Arthur were ruled out because they did not have the full doses of the COVID-19 vaccine, they were replaced by defender João Victor (Neguinho) and goalkeeper Léo Gugiel respectively.

Head coach: Marquinhos Xavier

No.	Pos.	Player	DoB (Age)	Club
1	GK	Guitta	11 June 1987 (aged 34)	(Portugal) Sporting CP
2	GK	Diego Roncáglio	15 July 1988 (aged 33)	(Portugal) Benfica
3	WG	Daniel Airoso	25 April 1996 (aged 25)	(Portugal) Eléctrico
4	DF	Neguinho	12 July 2000 (aged 21)	(Spain) Palma Futsal
5	WG	Matheus Rodrigues	3 October 1996 (aged 25)	(Spain) Barcelona
6	WG	Felipe Valério	8 July 1993 (aged 28)	(Spain) ElPozo Murcia
7	WG	Bruno	10 April 1987 (aged 34)	(Russia) MFK Ukhta
8	DF	Marlon	28 December 1987 (aged 34)	(Spain) Palma Futsal
9	PV	Rafa Santos	25 September 1990 (aged 31)	(Spain) ElPozo Murcia
10	PV	Pito	6 November 1991 (aged 30)	(Spain) Barcelona
11	PV	Ferrão	29 October 1990 (aged 31)	(Spain) Barcelona
12	WG	Marcênio	5 October 1987 (aged 34)	(Spain) Barcelona
13	PV	Bruno Taffy	30 March 1990 (aged 31)	(Russia) MFK Tyumen
14	GK	Léo Gugiel	13 June 1996 (aged 25)	(Russia) MFK Tyumen

=== Uruguay ===
Uruguay announced a preliminary squad of 15 players on 27 December 2021. The final squad of 14 players was announced on 14 January 2022. Winger Yhordi Segui withdrew from the squad after testing positive for SARS-CoV-2 and was replaced by Luciano Cosentino on 26 January 2022.

Head coach: Gabriel de Simone

No.	Pos.	Player	DoB (Age)	Club
1	GK	Christian Gaitán	8 October 1992 (aged 29)	(Uruguay) Boston River
2	WG	Alejandro Aunchayna	25 July 1999 (aged 22)	(Uruguay) Peñarol
3	DF	Maximiliano Navarro	1 July 1991 (aged 30)	(Italy) Todis Lido di Ostia
4	WG	Brandon Diaz	10 May 1996 (aged 25)	(Uruguay) Peñarol
5	WG	Agustín Sosa	23 February 1995 (aged 26)	(Italy) Sangiovannese
6	WG	Luciano Cosentino	2 February 1997 (aged 24)	(Uruguay) Club Malvín
7	WG	Xande	27 April 1988 (aged 33)	(Finland) FC Kemi
8	PV	Ignacio Salgués	25 February 1989 (aged 32)	(Uruguay) Peñarol
9	WG	Juan Custodio	15 November 1985 (aged 36)	(Uruguay) Peñarol
10	WG	Richard Catardo	15 December 1988 (aged 33)	(Uruguay) Peñarol
11	PV	Nicolás Ordoqui	12 September 1990 (aged 31)	(Uruguay) Peñarol
12	GK	Mathías Fernández	5 October 1993 (aged 28)	(Uruguay) Peñarol
13	PV	Nicolás Martínez	24 May 1999 (aged 22)	(Italy) Sicurlube Regalbuto
14	WG	Federico Fedele	28 April 1988 (aged 33)	(Italy) Pirossigeno Città di Cosenza

=== Colombia ===
Colombia announced a preliminary squad of 15 players on 13 December 2021. The final squad of 14 players was announced by CONMEBOL on 14 January 2022, and by the Colombian Football Federation on 27 January 2022.

Head coach: Roberto Bruno

No.	Pos.	Player	DoB (Age)	Club
1	GK	Esteban Sánchez	21 April 1994 (aged 27)	(Colombia) Saeta
2	DF	Julian Pardo	21 April 1999 (aged 22)	(Spain) Real Betis Futsal B
3	WG	Brayan Zapata	17 September 2000 (aged 21)	(Colombia) Real Antioquia
4	WG	Harrison Santos	1 June 2006 (aged 15)	(Colombia) Universidad Sergio Arboleda
5	WG	Felipe Echavarría	2 November 1992 (aged 29)	(Argentina) San Lorenzo
6	PV	Sebastián Sánchez	3 September 1995 (aged 26)	(Kosovo) FC Liqeni
7	PV	José Luis Tangarife	8 March 1995 (aged 26)	(Colombia) Itagüí Leones
8	PV	Jorge Abril	26 July 1987 (aged 34)	(Kosovo) FC Liqeni
9	DF	Yulian Diaz	9 March 1995 (aged 26)	(Kosovo) FC Liqeni
10	WG	Angellot Caro	3 December 1988 (aged 33)	(Czech Republic) Sparta Prague
11	WG	Camilo Gómez	11 March 1985 (aged 36)	(Colombia) C.D. Lyon
12	GK	Diego Muñoz	5 January 1989 (aged 33)	(Colombia) Universidad de Manizales
13	PV	Brayan Mera	18 July 1992 (aged 29)	(Colombia) C.D. Lyon
14	PV	Wilmar Ramírez	23 January 1990 (aged 32)	(France) Beaucaire Futsal

=== Ecuador ===
Ecuador announced a preliminary squad of 15 players on 10 January 2022. The final squad of 14 players was announced by CONMEBOL on 14 January 2022, and by the Ecuadorian Football Federation on 25 January 2022 with the following changes: Erik Sarco, Haminton Villareal and Sindulfo Estacio were included in the squad replacing defender Bryan Salazar and wingers Nelson Bustos and Robert Román respectively.

Head coach: Darío Meza

No.	Pos.	Player	DoB (Age)	Club
1	GK	Juan Guamán	25 February 1992 (aged 29)	(Ecuador) Aviced F.C.
2	WG	Jhon Huilca	13 June 2000 (aged 21)	(Ecuador) La Onda F.C.
3	DF	Henry Calderón	22 June 1989 (aged 32)	(Ecuador) G13 FC
4	DF	Jerson Nazareno	14 February 1997 (aged 24)	(Ecuador) Unión Española
5	WG	Erik Sarco	31 July 2001 (aged 20)	(Ecuador) Fluminense Blasa
6	DF	Bryan Montaño	1 May 1999 (aged 22)	(Ecuador) Società Sportiva Bocca
7	DF	Haminton Villareal	16 July 1985 (aged 36)	(Ecuador) Espe
8	WG	Dálember Segura	24 November 1999 (aged 22)	(Ecuador) Società Sportiva Bocca
9	PV	Jordan Mercado	12 November 1994 (aged 27)	(Ecuador) Società Sportiva Bocca
10	WG	Jimmy Espinales	27 April 1994 (aged 27)	(Ecuador) Laboratorio Divino Niño
11	WG	Ángel Izquierdo	1 March 1990 (aged 31)	(Ecuador) Naranjito Sport
12	GK	Eddy Albarracín	7 December 1999 (aged 22)	(Ecuador) Società Sportiva Bocca
13	DF	Edisson Serrano	1 June 1996 (aged 25)	(Ecuador) Aviced F.C.
14	PV	Sindulfo Estacio	28 July 1998 (aged 23)	(Ecuador) San Miguel

=== Chile ===
Chile announced their final squad of 14 players on 7 January 2022. Wingers Frank Carrasco and Christian Palacios were replaced by Franco Luxardo and Nicolás Chacón.

Head coach: (Argentina) Vicente De Luise

No.	Pos.	Player	DoB (Age)	Club
1	GK	Benjamín Maldonado	29 February 2000 (aged 21)	(Chile) Coquimbo Unido
2	PV	Cristian Arredondo	16 July 1990 (aged 31)	(Chile) Deportes Recoleta
3	WG	Alan Morán	3 September 2002 (aged 19)	(Chile) Magallanes
4	DF	Nicolás Lagos	7 December 1999 (aged 22)	Universidad de Chile
5	WG	Matías Toledo	20 April 1998 (aged 23)	(Chile) Coquimbo Unido
6	WG	Franco Luxardo	2 June 1990 (aged 31)	Universidad de Chile
7	WG	Jonathan Cáceres	29 June 2000 (aged 21)	(Chile) Coquimbo Unido
8	WG	Renato Martínez-Conde	27 December 1993 (aged 28)	(Argentina) Newell's Old Boys
9	PV	Javier Fuentealba	9 November 2001 (aged 20)	(Chile) Magallanes
10	PV	Nicolás Chacón	4 March 1999 (aged 22)	(Argentina) Gimnasia La Plata
11	WG	Martín Albornoz	8 October 2001 (aged 20)	(Chile) Colo-Colo
12	GK	Benjamín Fuentes	27 January 1999 (aged 23)	Universidad de Chile
13	DF	Joel González	17 September 1994 (aged 27)	(Argentina) Ateneo
14	DF	Joshua Barrios	28 May 2000 (aged 21)	(Chile) Magallanes

== Group B ==
=== Argentina ===
Argentina announced a preliminary squad of 16 players on 15 December 2021. The final squad of 14 players was announced by CONMEBOL on 14 January 2021, and by the Argentine Football Association on 26 January 2022.

Head coach: Matías Lucuix

No.	Pos.	Player	DoB (Age)	Club
1	GK	Nicolás Sarmiento	3 December 1992 (aged 29)	(Spain) Real Betis Futsal
2	WG	Andrés Geraghty	22 January 1998 (aged 24)	(Spain) Viña Albali Valdepeñas
3	WG	Ángel Claudino	8 December 1995 (aged 26)	(Spain) Fútbol Emotion Zaragoza
4	DF	Lucas Bolo	12 March 1992 (aged 29)	(Italy) Italservice Pesaro
5	DF	Maximiliano Rescia	29 October 1987 (aged 34)	(Spain) Levante UD
6	DF	Sebastián Corso	12 February 1992 (aged 29)	(Spain) Industrias Santa Coloma
7	WG	Leandro Cuzzolino	21 May 1987 (aged 34)	(Italy) Italservice Pesaro
8	WG	Matías Edelstein	18 June 1992 (aged 29)	(Italy) CMB Matera
9	PV	Cristian Borruto	7 May 1987 (aged 34)	(Italy) Italservice Pesaro
10	WG	Constantino Vaporaki	6 January 1990 (aged 32)	(Italy) Meta Catania
11	PV	Alan Brandi	24 November 1987 (aged 34)	(Spain) Jaén Paraíso Interior
12	GK	Matías Starna	26 January 1999 (aged 23)	(Spain) Peñiscola FS
13	PV	Matías Rosa	18 September 1995 (aged 26)	(Spain) ElPozo Murcia
14	DF	Pablo Taborda	3 September 1986 (aged 35)	(Italy) Italservice Pesaro

=== Paraguay ===
Paraguay announced a preliminary squad of 21 players on 3 November 2021. The final squad of 14 players was announced by CONMEBOL on 14 January 2022, and by Paraguayan Football Association on 28 January 2022 with Juan Manuel Benítez being included in the squad replacing winger Diego Poggi.

Head coach: Carlos Chilavert

No.	Pos.	Player	DoB (Age)	Club
1	GK	Igor Insfrán	29 August 2002 (aged 19)	(Paraguay) Deportivo Humaitá
2	DF	Alan Rojas	20 October 1998 (aged 23)	(Paraguay) Cerro Porteño
3	DF	Damián Mareco	4 September 1994 (aged 27)	(Paraguay) Sport Colonial
4	PV	Vander Méndez	3 October 1997 (aged 24)	(Italy) Saviatesta Mantova
5	DF	Wilson Veiga	3 October 1998 (aged 23)	(Paraguay) Cerro Porteño
6	PV	Richard Rejala	5 February 1994 (aged 27)	(Argentina) 17 de Agosto
7	WG	Javier Salas	22 September 1993 (aged 28)	(Italy) Italservice Pesaro
8	WG	Aranaldo Baez	30 March 1996 (aged 25)	(Paraguay) Cerro Porteño
9	WG	Hugo Martínez	12 January 1993 (aged 29)	(Paraguay) Afemec
10	WG	Juan Gómez Salas	<20 October 1990 (aged 31)	(Italy) Real San Giuseppe
11	WG	Francisco Martínez	12 January 1993 (aged 29)	(Paraguay) Cerro Porteño
12	GK	Giovanni González	5 May 1995 (aged 26)	(Paraguay) Cerro Porteño
13	WG	Pedro Garay	23 March 1989 (aged 32)	(Paraguay) Barrio Guaraní
14	WG	Juan Manuel Benítez	1 January 1998 (aged 24)	(Paraguay) Exa Ysaty

=== Venezuela ===
Venezuela announced a preliminary squad of 20 players on 8 January 2022. The final squad of 14 players was announced by CONMEBOL on 14 January 2022, and by the Venezuelan Football Federation on 26 January 2022 with the following changes: defender Ángel Muñoz withdrew from the squad due to an injury (fracture of the left zygomatic arch), and pivot Enderson Suárez tested positive for SARS-CoV-2 and was replaced by Wilson Escalona, in addition, goalkepper Freddy Chacín and wingers Jackson Salazar and Alexander Moreno were included in the squad replacing goalkepper Keiverd Ortiz and defenders Keiber Quevedo and Ángel Muñoz respectively.

Head coach: Freddy González

No.	Pos.	Player	DoB (Age)	Club
1	GK	Freddy Chacín	6 December 1991 (aged 30)	(Portugal) Rangel
2	DF	Carlos Sanz	21 March 1996 (aged 25)	(Croatia) MNK Novo Vrijeme
3	WG	Oscar Fernández	21 August 1998 (aged 23)	(Argentina) Barracas Central
4	WG	Jackson Salazar	10 July 2001 (aged 20)	(Venezuela) DCN Futsal
5	DF	Henry Gutiérrez	10 May 1997 (aged 24)	(Finland) FC Kemi
6	WG	Alexander Moreno	3 October 1994 (aged 27)	(Estonia) FC Cosmos Tallinn
7	WG	Jesús Viamonte	9 April 1997 (aged 24)	(Spain) Manzanares FS
8	WG	Andrés Terán	20 April 1998 (aged 23)	(Argentina) Barracas Central
9	PV	Wilson Escalona	9 April 1993 (aged 28)	(Venezuela) Trujillanos
10	PV	Wilson Francia	25 May 1996 (aged 25)	(Spain) O Parrulo Ferrol
11	WG	Alfredo Vidal	3 February 1994 (aged 27)	(Venezuela) Portuguesa
12	GK	José Villalobos	26 November 1991 (aged 30)	(Venezuela) Dragones de Carabobo
13	WG	Jean Trujillo	5 May 1994 (aged 27)	(Bolivia) Petrolero
14	PV	Rafael Morillo	20 October 1992 (aged 29)	(Venezuela) Centauros de Caracas

=== Bolivia ===
Bolivia announced a preliminary squad of 27 players on 12 December 2021. The final squad of 14 players was announced on 14 January 2021. Winger Romario Tórrez and defender Roberto Guerrero were replaced by Miguel Padilla and Horacio Miranda respectively.

Head coach: Mauricio Arnez

No.	Pos.	Player	DoB (Age)	Club
1	WG	Miguel Padilla	12 June 1996 (aged 25)	(Bolivia) Víctor Muriel
2	GK	Ramiro Mendívil	7 November 1993 (aged 28)	(Bolivia) Deportivo Concepción
3	WG	Jesús Ardaya	3 June 2001 (aged 20)	(Bolivia) CRE
4	WG	Carlos Ramos	8 February 2000 (aged 21)	(Bolivia) San Martín
5	WG	Saúl Gareca	8 December 1995 (aged 26)	(Bolivia) San Martín
6	PV	Enrique Florero	31 May 1996 (aged 25)	(Bolivia) Víctor Muriel
7	PV	Alán Valda	19 February 1994 (aged 27)	(Bolivia) Deportivo Concepción
8	WG	Omar Gonzales	16 March 1996 (aged 25)	(Bolivia) Deportivo Concepción
9	WG	Juan Carlos Wiza	21 July 1993 (aged 28)	(Bolivia) Proyecto Latín
10	WG	Rómer Herrera	1 December 1995 (aged 26)	(Bolivia) CRE
11	WG	Bruno Tecos	30 April 1998 (aged 23)	(Bolivia) Proyecto Latín
12	GK	Carlos Vargas	6 June 2001 (aged 20)	(Bolivia) Nantes- Oscar Sánchez
13	WG	Horacio Miranda	17 September 1998 (aged 23)	(Bolivia) Petrolero
14	DF	Eduar Chavarría	28 February 1994 (aged 27)	(Bolivia) Petrolero

=== Peru ===
Peru's final squad of 14 players was announced by CONMEBOL on 14 January 2022, and by the Peruvian Football Federation on 18 January 2022. Winger Angello Paipay was replaced by Jordi Rivera.

Head coach: (Brazil) Francisco Castelo Branco

No.	Pos.	Player	DoB (Age)	Club
1	GK	Alonso Tizón	3 March 1987 (aged 34)	(Peru) Universitario
2	WG	Juan José Malache	19 December 1993 (aged 28)	(Peru) Universitario
3	WG	Sebastián Obando	1 November 1994 (aged 27)	(Peru) Universitario
4	DF	Paulo Herrera	13 November 1991 (aged 30)	(Peru) Deportivo Overall
5	PV	Hugo Barrantes	27 November 1991 (aged 30)	(Peru) Deportivo Overall
6	WG	Jorge Aguilar	6 June 1992 (aged 29)	(Peru) Universitario
7	WG	Junior Ulloa	8 February 2000 (aged 21)	(Peru) Deportivo Overall
8	DF	Samuel Angulo	17 October 1988 (aged 33)	(Peru) Panta Walon
9	WG	Manuel Millares	11 April 1993 (aged 28)	(Peru) Universitario
10	WG	Xavier Tavera	17 July 1990 (aged 31)	(Peru) Primero de Mayo
11	PV	Franco Colán	21 November 1990 (aged 31)	(Peru) Universitario
12	GK	Daniel Álvarez	14 May 2000 (aged 21)	(Spain) Fútbol Emotion Zaragoza
13	GK	Eder Pérez	18 August 1992 (aged 29)	(Peru) Panta Walon
14	WG	Jordi Rivera	10 June 1993 (aged 28)
