= Nationwide Futsal Cup =

The Nationwide Futsal Cup is a single futsal match played between league champions of Albania and Kosovo. It was established in 2010 in a match played in Pristina between FK Tirana of Tirana and FC Bamboo of Pristina.

After regular time ended 5-5, FK Tirana won by penalty shoot-outs and lifted the trophy for the first time.

The second final was played in Kumanovo between KS Ali Demi and FK Presevo. KS Ali Demi won 7–3, winning the Cup.

== Champions ==
| Season | Winner |
|---|---|
| 2010 | FK Tirana |
| 2015 | KS Ali Demi |
