= Pesaro Calcio a 5 =

Italservice Pesaro Calcio a 5
- Full name: Società Sportiva Dilettantistica Italservice Pesaro Calcio a 5
- Founded: 2011; 14 years ago
- Ground: PalaCampanara, Pesaro
- Chairman: Lorenzo Pizza
- Manager: Fulvio Colini
- League: Serie A
- 2018–19: Serie A, 1st
- Website: https://www.pesarocalcioa5.it/

Pesaro Calcio a 5, also known for sponsorship reasons as Italservice Pesaro, is a futsal club based in Pesaro, Italy. Founded in 2011, they play in the Serie A and won their first championship in 2019.

The club runs youth teams at under-19, under-17, under-15, esordiente, pulcini and primi calci.

== History ==
The club was founded in 2011 when Pesaro Five and Palextra Fano merged to form PesaroFano Calcio a 5. Carlo Mercantini, the owner of a furniture business, became its first president. In their debut season they played in the second-tier Serie A2, finishing in fifth place in Group A and reaching the quarter-finals.

In their third season, PesaroFano finished third in their group and again reached the quarterfinals. They also reached the finals of the Serie A2 Coppa Italia. The following year, naturalized Italian player Felipe Tonidandel was named team captain. They lost in the finals to Montesilvano, but won the 2014–2015 Serie A2 Coppa Italia to capture their first trophy in club history. Tonidandel scored the decisive penalty in the final against Orte, the team they had lost to in the finals the year before.

In 2016–17, PesaroFano placed first in Group A by winning 22 out of 26 regular-season games, directly qualifying for promotion to the top-tier Serie A. They also won the Serie A2 Coppa Italia for a second time. Héctor Albadalejo led the team in scoring in both competitions. The team name was shortened to Pesaro Calcio a 5 after the season.

=== Serie A ===
In the team's first season in the top division, Ramiro López Díaz served as their head coach. They finished in 7th place and lost in the first round of the playoffs to eventual champions Acqua e Sapone.

In the summer of 2018, the team purchased several world-class players, such as Italian national team members Humberto Honorio, Michele Miarelli, Mauro Canal and Ricardo Caputo as well as imports Cristian Borruto, Pablo Taborda and Javier Adolfo Salas. At head coach, they hired Fulvio Colini, who won the 2010–11 UEFA Futsal Cup with Montesilvano as well as four Serie A league titles with four different teams. That year, newly-named Italservice Calcio a 5 finished second in the regular-season standings behind Acqua e Sapone. Cristian Borruto led the league in goals scored with 28. In the playoff finals, Italservice defeated Acqua e Sapone in five games to win their first top division title. They also reached the finals of the Coppa Italia and the Coppa della Divisione.

One week before the start of the 2019–20 season, Italservice defeated Acqua e Sapon 4–2 to win the 2019 Supercoppa Italiana, the first in club history. Marcelinho, Pablo Taborda, Felipe Tonidandel and Jonas were the goalscorers. On February 16, 2020, Italservice defeated rivals Acqua e Sapon 5–1 for their tenth consecutive win. They defeated CAME Dosson 7–3 the following week, extending the streak to 11. However, they were not able to reach the record of 13 because the league announced in March it was suspending competition due to the COVID-19 pandemic.

Italservice qualified for the 2019–20 UEFA Futsal Champions League by winning the previous season's league title. They went undefeated in the main round, winning all three matches. For the elite round held in Almaty, they were placed in Group C, described as the "group of death" for including Benfica, ElPozo and Kairat. They began the stage by upsetting the eight time Portuguese league champions Benfica by a score of 5–1. However, they lost 5–3 to the hometown club Kairat the following day and subsequently tied 3–3 with Spanish giants ElPozo to finish second in the group. ElPozo moved on to the final four, which was cancelled due to the COVID-19 pandemic.

== Current squad ==
Last Update: 20 May 2023

#	Position	Name	Nationality
12	Goalkeeper	Tommaso Vesprini	(Italy)
27	Goalkeeper	Manuel Cianni	(Italy)
37	Goalkeeper	Davide Putano	(Italy)
5	Defender	Felipe Tonidandel	(Italy)
6	Defender	Jukka Kytölä	(Finland)
2	Winger	Diego Della Costanza	(Italy)
3	Winger	Alex Ugolini	(Italy)
7	Winger	Giuliano Fortini	(Italy)
8	Winger	Diego Pires	(Brazil)
11	Winger	Mauro Canal	(Italy)
16	Winger	Aaro Paappanen	(Finland)
21	Winger	Murilo Schiochet	(Brazil)
23	Winger	Eduardo Dalcin	(Brazil)
10	Pivot	João Miguel	(Portugal)
18	Pivot	Júlio de Oliveira	(Italy)
31	Pivot	Ruan Alflen	(Brazil)

== Managers ==
- (Brazil) Gil Marques (2011–2012)
- (Italy) Roberto Osimani (2012–2016)
- (Brazil) Cafu (2016–2017)
- (Spain) Ramiro López Díaz (2017–2018)
- (Italy) Fulvio Colini (2018–present)

== Honours ==
=== Domestic ===
==== League ====
- Serie A
  - Champions (3): 2018–19, 2020–21, 2021-22
- Serie A2 Group A
  - Champions (1): 2016–17

==== Cup ====
- Supercoppa Italiana
  - Winners (1): 2019
- Coppa Italia
  - Runners-up: 2018–2019
- Coppa della Divisione
  - Runners-up (1): 2018–2019
- Coppa Italia di Serie A2
  - Winners (1): 2014–2015, 2016–2017
  - Runners-up (1): 2013–2014

==== Youth ====
- Under-21 Serie A
  - Champions (1): 2011–12

== International results ==
Season	Competition	Round	Country	Opponent	Result	Venue (Host City)	Qualified
2019/20	UEFA Futsal; Champions League	Main Round	(Germany)	TSV Weilimdorf	5–3	Agnebergshallen (Uddevalla)	1st place
2019/20	UEFA Futsal; Champions League	Main Round	(Georgia (country))	Georgians Tbilisi	5–1	Agnebergshallen (Uddevalla)	1st place
2019/20	UEFA Futsal; Champions League	Main Round	(Sweden)	Uddevalla	3–1	Agnebergshallen (Uddevalla)	1st place
2019/20	UEFA Futsal; Champions League	Elite Round	(Portugal)	Benfica	5–1	Baluan Sholak; Sports Palace (Almaty)	2nd place
2019/20	UEFA Futsal; Champions League	Elite Round	(Kazakhstan)	Kairat	3–5	Baluan Sholak; Sports Palace (Almaty)	2nd place
2019/20	UEFA Futsal; Champions League	Elite Round	(Spain)	ElPozo	3–3	Baluan Sholak; Sports Palace (Almaty)	2nd place
2020/21	UEFA Futsal; Champions League	Preliminary Round	(Montenegro)	KMF Titograd	6–0	Verde Complex (Podgorica)	
2020/21	UEFA Futsal; Champions League	Round of 32	(France)	ACCS	2–2 (7–8 p)	Teddy Riner Arena (Asnières-sur-Seine)	
2021/22	UEFA Futsal; Champions League	Main Round	(Russia)	Tyumen	2–3	RDS Stadium (Rimini)	4th place
2021/22	UEFA Futsal; Champions League	Main Round	(Czech Republic)	Plzeň	4–2	RDS Stadium (Rimini)	4th place
2021/22	UEFA Futsal; Champions League	Main Round	(Kazakhstan)	Kairat	2–3	RDS Stadium (Rimini)	4th place
