= Tyumensky Legion =

Russian Ice Hockey team

- City: Tyumen, Russia
- League: Youth Hockey League (MHL)
- Conference: Eastern
- Division: silver
- Founded: 2010; 16 years ago
- Folded: 2026; 0 years ago
- Home arena: Sports Palace Tyumen
- Colors
- Head coach: Valeri Dudzinsky
- Affiliates: Rubin Tyumen (VHL)
- Website: legion.hcrubin.ru

Franchise history
- 2010–12: MHC Gazovik
- 2012–present: Tyumensky Legion

Tyumen Legion (Russian: Тюменский Легион) is an ice hockey team in Tyumen, Russia. Founded in 2012, they play in the Russian Minor Hockey League. The team plays its home games at the Sports Palace Tyumen.

In 6 june 2026, it was disbanded due to lack of funds.
