= Albanian Futsal Cup =

- Founded: 2011
- Country: Albania
- Confederation: UEFA
- Number of clubs: 8
- International cup: UEFA Futsal Cup
- Current champions: Flamurtari Vlorë
- Most championships: KS Ali Demi (4)

The Albanian Futsal Cup is the second most important event in Albanian futsal, after the League. It was founded in 2011 and 8 best teams of the season took part. KS Ali Demi were crowned winners of the first Cup, beating 5 times futsal champions Tirana by penalties 4–3, after regular and extra time finished in a 2–2 draw. The final was played out on December 24, 2011, and took place in Asllan Rusi Sports Palace in Tirana. The 2016 final played on May 3, 2016 between Ali Demi and Tirana ended 9–5, with Ali Demi triumphing once again with the same opponent and lifting their record 4th cup.

After a long pause, the Cup returned in January 2023 with its 6th edition. 4 teams took part and Flamurtari Vlorë Futsal won their first trophy, defeating KF Partizani 9-7 in the final. It was played on 18 February in the "Goga Complex" in Durrës.

KS Ali Demi are the most successful team with 4 trophies won.

== Winners ==
- 2011 KS Ali Demi
- 2012 Futsal Klub Tirana
- 2014 KS Ali Demi
- 2015 KS Ali Demi
- 2016 KS Ali Demi
- 2023 Futsal Klub Tirana
- 2024 Flamurtari Vlorë
- 2025 Flamurtari Vlorë

=== Champions ===
- KS Ali Demi: 4 times
- Futsal Klub Tirana: 2 times
- Flamurtari Vlorë: 2 times

== See also ==
- Albanian Cup, football men's cup
