= Maccabi Nahalat Yitzhak Tel Aviv =

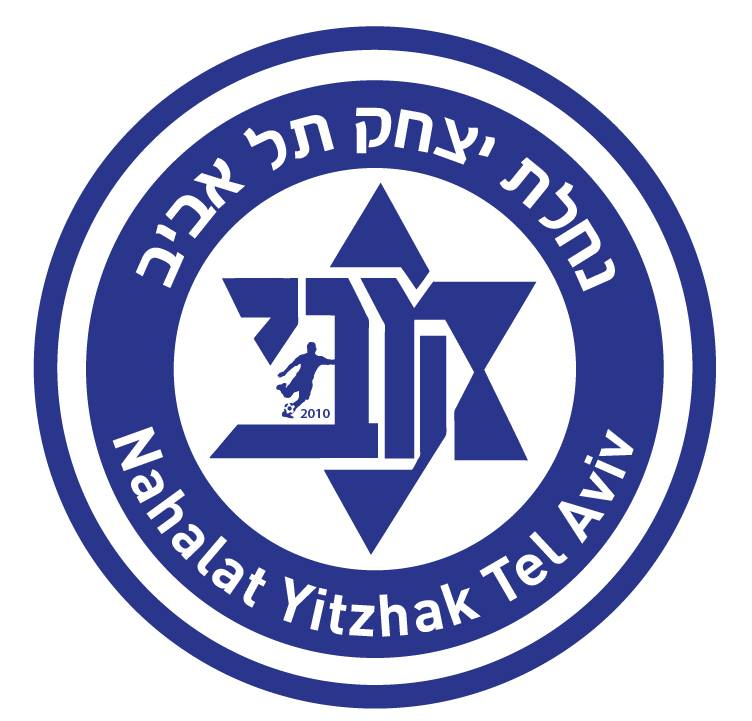
- Full name: Maccabi Nahalat Yitzhak Tel Aviv
- Founded: 2010
- Ground: Tichonet, Tel Aviv, Israel
- Capacity: 700
- Chairman: (Israel) Hen Levincron
- Manager: (Israel) Hen Levincron
- League: Israeli Futsal League
Home colours	Away colours

Maccabi Nahalat Yitzhak Tel Aviv is a futsal club based in Tel Aviv, israel. The club was founded in 2010, and plays in the Israeli Futsal League and other domestic and international competitions.

== History ==
Maccabi Nahalat Yitzhak Tel Aviv was founded in 2010 by two childhood friends: Hen Levincron and Doron Chicko, the first team's members were friends who grew up together from kindergarten in the small neighborhood, Nahalat Yitzhak, in the city Tel Aviv, Israel. Since that moment, the club's vision and DNA is based on great friendship between all members.

== Honours ==
=== National ===
- 5 Championships : 2011/12, 2016/17, 2017/18, 2018 (outdoor), 2018/19

=== International ===
- UEFA Futsal Cup Preliminary Round:
  - 2nd place : 2012/13
  - 3rd place : 2017/18
  - 3rd place : 2018/19
- Amsterdam Tournament 2014 : Winners
- European Maccabi Games 2015 Berlin: Silver Medal
- F5WC World Cup 2018: Semi Final

== Current squad ==
Note: Flags indicate national team as defined under FIFA eligibility rules; some limited exceptions apply. Players may hold more than one non-FIFA nationality.

No.	Pos.	Nation	Player
1	GK	ISR	Shlomi Malul
19	GK	ISR	Nadav Kastro
3	GK	ISR	Raz Burgana
2	DF	ISR	Ivan Diedunev
14	DF	ISR	Adam Cohen
20	DF	ISR	Alek Stunis
7	MF	ISR	Elad Rosenberger
10	MF	ISR	Tamir Shklonik
11	MF	ISR	Meir Wiess

No.	Pos.	Nation	Player
18	MF	ISR	Idan Shkolnik
6	FW	ISR	Or Goldstien
8	FW	ISR	Raz Zur
9	FW	ISR	Maor Vadut
12	FW	ISR	Dor Osadon
16	FW	ISR	Yehonatan Natan

== UEFA Club Competitions record ==
=== UEFA Futsal Cup ===
Season	Competition	Round	Country	Opponent	Result	Venue
2012/13	UEFA Futsal Cup	First Round	(Armenia)	Shaumyan Yerevan	3-3	Andorra la Vella
2012/13	UEFA Futsal Cup	First Round	(Norway)	Vegakameratne	0-0	Andorra la Vella
2012/13	UEFA Futsal Cup	First Round	(Andorra)	Encamp	7-4	Andorra la Vella
2017/18	UEFA Futsal Cup	First Round	(North Macedonia)	Shkupi	1-5	Linz, Austria
2017/18	UEFA Futsal Cup	First Round	(Austria)	Diamant Linz	3-1	Linz, Austria
2017/18	UEFA Futsal Cup	First Round	(Malta)	Luxol st Andrews Futsal Club	3-4	Linz, Austria
2018/19	UEFA Futsal Champions League	First Round	(Bosnia and Herzegovina)	Mostar	0-4	Mostar, Bosnia and Herzegovina
2018/19	UEFA Futsal Champions League	First Round	(Denmark)	Gentofte	1-8	Mostar, Bosnia and Herzegovina
2018/19	UEFA Futsal Champions League	First Round	(Scotland)	Wattcel	8-3	Mostar, Bosnia and Herzegovina
