= Futsal Klub Tirana =

- Full name: Futsal Klub Tirana
- Nicknames: Legjenda Bardh e Blu, Tirona, Bardheblutë
- Founded: 2002
- Ground: Tirana, Albania
- Chairman: Refik Halili
- Manager: Artur Angoni
- League: Albanian Futsal Championship
| Home colours | Away colours |

Futsal Klub Tirana or short FK Tirana (English: Futsal Club Tirana) are the most successful Albanian futsal club. In their short existence they have already won 15 major domestic trophies; 13 championships of the Albanian Futsal Championship and twice Cup winners. In international level they also hold one trophy of the Nationwide Futsal Cup.

This is the futsal wing of SK Tirana Multisport Club.

FK Tirana have also participated in UEFA Futsal Cup (now UEFA Futsal Champions League) 13 times, most of any other Albanian futsal club from Albania. Few of these participations have been successful, such those of seasons 2004–05, 2006–07, 2018–19 and 2022-23 when they achieved important victories and were excluded from Main Round only due to a single lost match.

== Domestic achievements ==
Albanian Futsal Championship Champions - 13 (2003–04, 2005–06, 2007–08, 2008–09, 2009–10, 2015–16, 2017–18, 2018–19, 2020–21, 2021–22, 2022–23, 2023–24, 2025-26)

Albanian Futsal Cup Winners - 2 (2012, 2023)

Albanian Futsal SuperCup Runners Up - 1 (2025)

== International ==
- Nationwide Futsal Cup
  - Winners (1): 2010

=== European results ===
Appearances: 12

| Season | Competition | Round | Country | Opponent | Result | Venue | Qualified |
|---|---|---|---|---|---|---|---|
| 2004–05 | UEFA Futsal Cup | Preliminary Round | (England) | Sheffield Hallam | 6–4 | EIS, Sheffield | 2nd place |
| 2004–05 | UEFA Futsal Cup | Preliminary Round | (Bulgaria) | MAG Varna | 3–3 | EIS, Sheffield | 2nd place |
| 2004–05 | UEFA Futsal Cup | First Qualifying Round | (Russia) | Dinamo Moskva | 2–23 | AWF, Kraków | 4th place |
| 2004–05 | UEFA Futsal Cup | First Qualifying Round | (Poland) | Baustal Krakow | 3–6 | AWF, Kraków | 4th place |
| 2004–05 | UEFA Futsal Cup | First Qualifying Round | (Georgia (country)) | Iberia Tbilisi | 5–7 | AWF, Kraków | 4th place |
| 2006–07 | UEFA Futsal Cup | Preliminary Round | (Sweden) | Skövde AIK | 5–8 | Arena Mladost, Sofia | 2nd place |
| 2006–07 | UEFA Futsal Cup | Preliminary Round | (Malta) | Hibernians FC | 7–3 | Arena Mladost, Sofia | 2nd place |
| 2006–07 | UEFA Futsal Cup | Preliminary Round | (Bulgaria) | Mladost Sofia | 10–9 | Arena Mladost, Sofia | 2nd place |
| 2008–09 | UEFA Futsal Cup | Preliminary Round | (Denmark) | Albertslund IF | 2–2 | S.Darius & S.Girenas Sport Center, Kaunas | 3rd place |
| 2008–09 | UEFA Futsal Cup | Preliminary Round | (Moldova) | Dinamo Chisinau | 4–9 | S.Darius & S.Girenas Sport Center, Kaunas | 3rd place |
| 2008–09 | UEFA Futsal Cup | Preliminary Round | (Lithuania) | Nautara Kaunas | 4–6 | S.Darius & S.Girenas Sport Center, Kaunas | 3rd place |
| 2009–10 | UEFA Futsal Cup | Preliminary Round | (Malta) | White Eagles | 4–3 | S.Darius & S.Girenas Sport Center, Kaunas | 2nd place |
| 2009–10 | UEFA Futsal Cup | Preliminary Round | (Andorra) | Madriu | 4–2 | S.Darius & S.Girenas Sport Center, Kaunas | 2nd place |
| 2009–10 | UEFA Futsal Cup | Preliminary Round | (Lithuania) | Nautara Kaunas | 3–4 | S.Darius & S.Girenas Sport Center, Kaunas | 2nd place |
| 2010-11 | UEFA Futsal Cup | Preliminary Round | (Finland) | Ilves FS | 1–3 | Cottonera Sports Complex, Cospicua | 4th place |
| 2010-11 | UEFA Futsal Cup | Preliminary Round | (Denmark) | Futsal BGA | 4–5 | Cottonera Sports Complex, Cospicua | 4th place |
| 2010-11 | UEFA Futsal Cup | Preliminary Round | (Malta) | ZC Excess | 2–4 | Cottonera Sports Complex, Cospicua | 4th place |
| 2016–17 | UEFA Futsal Cup | Preliminary Round | (Slovenia) | Brezje Maribor | 2–4 | Tabor Hall, Maribor | 4th place |
| 2016–17 | UEFA Futsal Cup | Preliminary Round | (Poland) | Zduńska Wola | 3–8 | Tabor Hall, Maribor | 4th place |
| 2016–17 | UEFA Futsal Cup | Preliminary Round | (Luxembourg) | FC Munsbach | 1–5 | Tabor Hall, Maribor | 4th place |
| 2018–19 | UEFA Futsal Champions League | Preliminary Round | (Germany) | Hohenstein-Ernstthal | 2-4 | HOT-Sportzentrum, Hohenstein-Ernstthal | 3rd place |
| 2018–19 | UEFA Futsal Champions League | Preliminary Round | (Greece) | Doukas | 1-1 | HOT-Sportzentrum, Hohenstein-Ernstthal | 3rd place |
| 2018–19 | UEFA Futsal Champions League | Preliminary Round | (Northern Ireland) | Belfast United | 5-4 | HOT-Sportzentrum, Hohenstein-Ernstthal | 3rd place |
| 2019–20 | UEFA Futsal Champions League | Preliminary Round | (Finland) | Kampuksen Dynamo | 0-1 | Kalev Sports Hall, Tallinn | 4th place |
| 2019–20 | UEFA Futsal Champions League | Preliminary Round | (Estonia) | SMS Viimsi | 2-7 | Kalev Sports Hall, Tallinn | 4th place |
| 2019–20 | UEFA Futsal Champions League | Preliminary Round | (France) | Toulon Élite | 3-9 | Kalev Sports Hall, Tallinn | 4th place |
| 2020–21 | UEFA Futsal Champions League | Preliminary Round | (Kosovo) | Prishtina | 0-3 | Palace of Youth and Sports, Pristina | |
| 2021–22 | UEFA Futsal Champions League | Preliminary Round | (Luxembourg) | Differdange 03 | 4-2 | Tirana Olympic Park, Tirana | 3rd place |
| 2021–22 | UEFA Futsal Champions League | Preliminary Round | (Norway) | Utleira | 2-4 | Tirana Olympic Park, Tirana | 3rd place |
| 2021–22 | UEFA Futsal Champions League | Preliminary Round | (Hungary) | Haladas | 2-3 | Tirana Olympic Park, Tirana | 3rd place |
| 2022–23 | UEFA Futsal Champions League | Preliminary Round | (Cyprus) | APOEL Futsal | 5-2 | Tirana Olympic Park, Tirana | 2nd place |
| 2022–23 | UEFA Futsal Champions League | Preliminary Round | (Northern Ireland) | Belfast United | 15-0 | Tirana Olympic Park, Tirana | 2nd place |
| 2022–23 | UEFA Futsal Champions League | Preliminary Round | (Luxembourg) | Differdange03 | 3-4 | Tirana Olympic Park, Tirana | 2nd place |
| 2023–24 | UEFA Futsal Champions League | Preliminary Round | (Northern Ireland) | Sparta Belfast | 7-3 | Tirana Olympic Park, Tirana | 2nd place |
| 2023–24 | UEFA Futsal Champions League | Preliminary Round | (Bosnia and Herzegovina) | KMF Radnik Bijeljina | 2-7 | Tirana Olympic Park, Tirana | 2nd place |

==== Overall results ====
| Overall | PPs | GP | W | D | L | GF | GA | GD | PTs |
|---|---|---|---|---|---|---|---|---|---|
| Total | 13 | 38 | 11 | 4 | 23 | 136 | 180 | -44 | 37 |

== Current squad ==
The following players played the 2021–22 UEFA Futsal Champions League.

| # | Position | Name | Nationality |
|---|---|---|---|
| 1 | Goalkeeper | Klodian Rrapi | (Albania) |
| 2 | Defender | Miland Prendi | (Albania) |
| 3 | Winger | Malush Qerimi | (Kosovo) |
| 4 | Winger | Klevis Malaj | (Albania) |
| 5 | Pivot | Halim Selmanaj | (Albania) |
| 6 | Defender | Jeton Rukovci | (Kosovo) |
| 7 | Winger | Vasil Kica | (Albania) |
| 8 | Winger | Ramadan Alaj | (Kosovo) |
| 9 | Pivot | Mentor Mejzini | (Albania) |
| 10 | Winger | Endrit Kaca | (Albania) |
| 11 | Winger | Arben Skanja | (Albania) |
| 12 | Goalkeeper | Alban Shiba | (Albania) |
| 13 | Defender | Ermir Kryeziu | (Albania) |
| 14 | Pivot | Melos Kelmendi | (Kosovo) |
