= Daniel Japonês =

Brazilian futsal player

Personal information
- Full name: Daniel Shiraishi Rollemberg Albuquerque
- Date of birth: 16 February 1986 (age 40)
- Place of birth: São Paulo, Brazil
- Height: 1.75 m (5 ft 9 in)
- Position: Winger

Team information
- Current team: Joinville
- Number: 6

Senior career*
Years	Team	Apps	(Gls)
2004	Banespa		
2005	Minas		
2006	São Paulo		
2007	São Bernardo		
2008–2014	Carlos Barbosa		
2015–2019	Inter FS		
2019–2021	Barcelona		
2021–	Joinville		

International career^{‡}
- Brazil
- * Club domestic league appearances and goals as of 00:00, 28 January 2022 (UTC) ‡ National team caps and goals as of 00:00, 19 January 2019 (UTC)

Daniel Shiraishi Rollemberg Albuquerque (born 16 February 1986), also known as Daniel Japonês, is a Brazilian futsal player of Japanese descent who plays as a winger for Joinville and the Brazilian national futsal team.

== Honours ==
- UEFA Futsal Champions League fourth place: 2018–19
