= Oleksandr Bondar (futsal player) =

Ukrainian futsal player (born 1981)

Personal information
- Full name: Oleksandr Bondar
- Date of birth: 24 September 1981 (age 45)
- Place of birth: Zdolbuniv, Ukraine
- Height: 1.72 m (5 ft 8 in)
- Position: Winger

Team information
- Current team: Rekord Bielsko-Biela

Senior career*
Years	Team	Apps	(Gls)
1999–2005	Kardynal-Rivne		
2005–2007	SK Energia Lviv		
2007–2010	Time Lviv		
2010–2011	SK Energia Lviv		
2011–2013	Kardynal-Rivne		
2014–2015	Wisła Krakbet Kraków	25	(28)
2015–2016	Red Devils Chojnice	24	(31)
2016–	BTS Rekord Bielsko-Biała	47	(46)

International career
- Ukraine
- * Club domestic league appearances and goals

Oleksandr Bondar, Ukrainian: Олександр Олександрович Бондар (born 24 September 1981 in Zdolbuniv), is a Ukrainian futsal player who plays for Rekord Bielsko-Biała and the Ukraine national futsal team.
