= Arena Nova =

Multi-purpose stadium in Wiener Neustadt, Austria

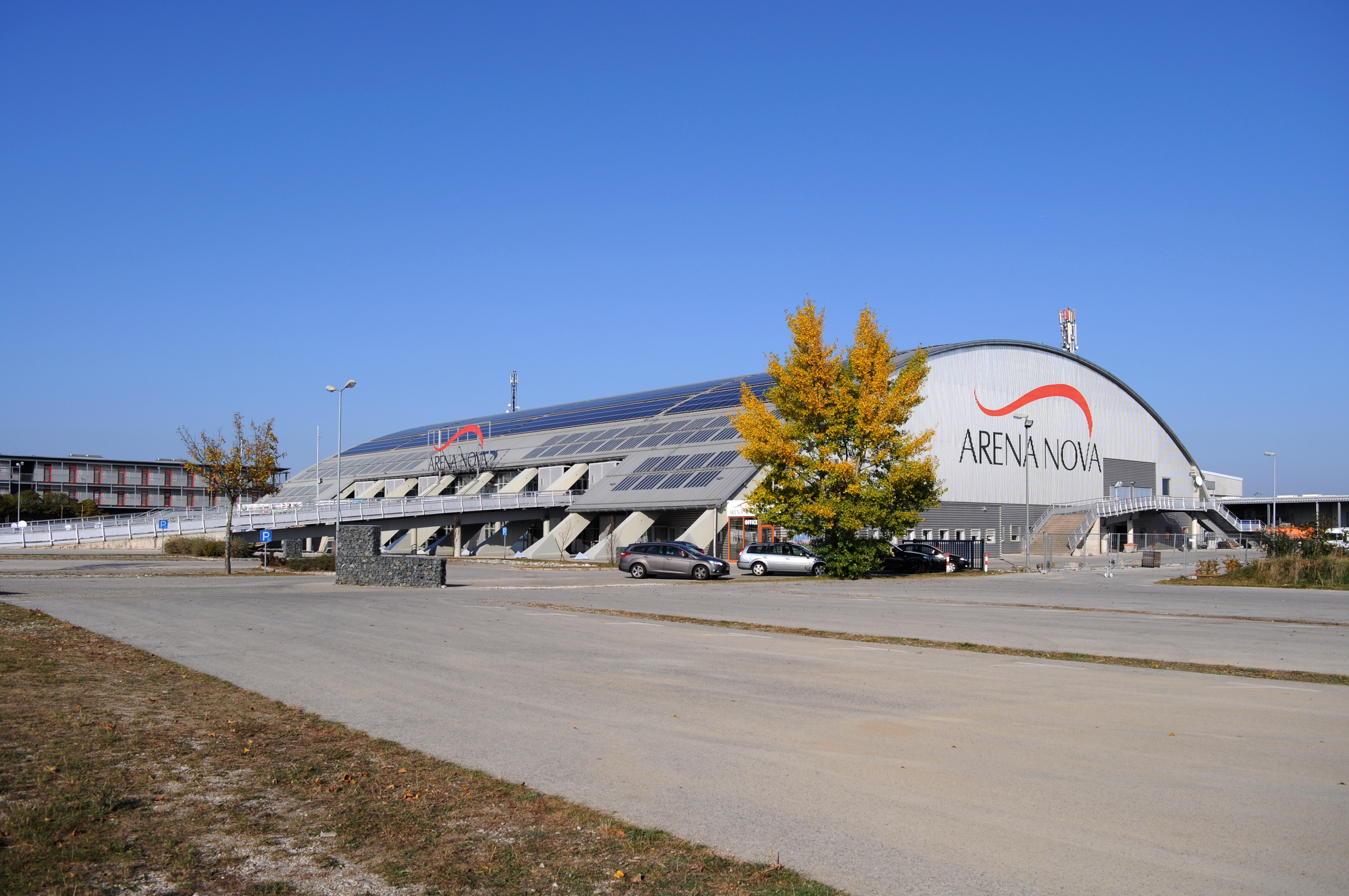
- Interactive map of Arena Nova
- Location: Wiener Neustadt, Vienna, Austria
- Coordinates: 47.840975°N 16.254101°E
- Capacity: 5,000
- Field size: 90 x 62 m

Construction
- Opened: 1994

Arena Nova is an indoor multi-purpose stadium located in Wiener Neustadt, Austria. The arena has an overall seating capacity of approximately 5,000.

This is the biggest event arena in Lower Austria, and it is used to hold sporting events, exhibitions and concerts.

== History ==
It was the venue for the Final of the 1995 World Women's Handball Championship, and one of the venues during the 2010 European Men's Handball Championship.

In 1999 the arena won the Bronze Medal at the IOC/IAKS Award.

== See also ==
- List of indoor arenas in Austria
