= Humberto Honorio =

Brazilian-born Italian futsal player

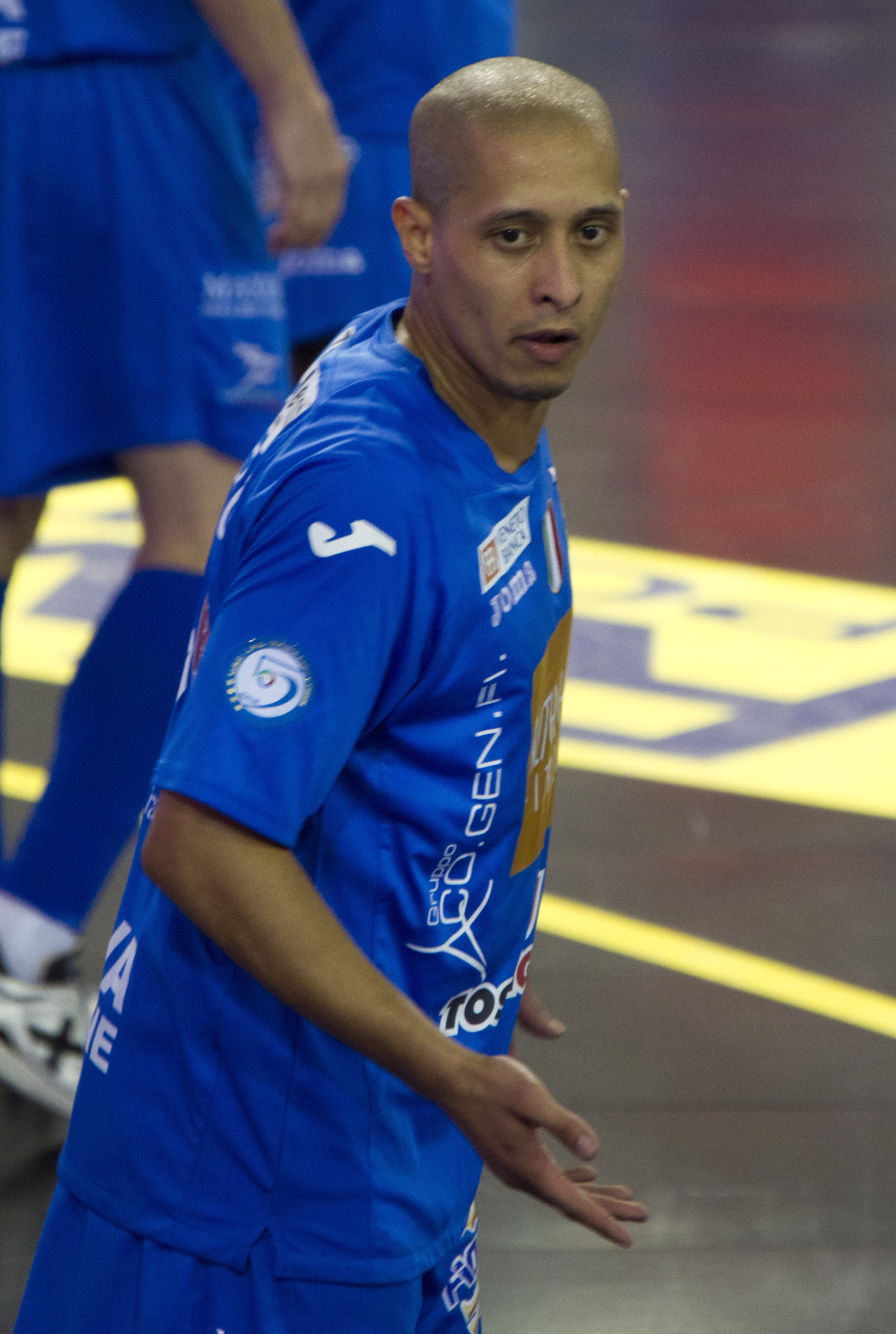

Personal information
- Full name: Humberto Honorio
- Date of birth: 21 July 1983 (age 43)
- Place of birth: São Paulo, Brazil
- Position: Pivot

Team information
- Current team: Italservice

Senior career*
Years	Team	Apps	(Gls)
2003–2004	San Lazzaro		
2004–2006	Prato		
2006–2018	Luparense		
2018–	Italservice		

International career
2005–	Italy	72	(23)
- * Club domestic league appearances and goals as of 19.01.18

Humberto Honorio (born 21 July 1983), is a Brazilian born, Italian futsal player who plays for Italservice and the Italian national futsal team.
