= European Maccabi Games 2015 =

International Jewish multi-sport event

The 14th European Maccabi Games (EMG2015) took place in Berlin from July 27 to August 5, 2015. The European Maccabiah Games take place in a four-year cycle, always two years after the Maccabiah in Israel. For this edition, Germany was selected as the venue for the first time in games' history. 2,300 athletes from 38 countries competed in 19 sports.

The main venue, the Oympia Stadion in Berlin was where the 1936 Summer Olympics were held, during the Nazi Germany regime. At that time, Jews were discouraged from participating.

== Sports ==
The 19 sports in which competitions were held included: badminton, basketball, bridge, dressage, fencing, field hockey, football, futsal, golf, half-marathon, chess, swimming, squash, tennis, ten pin bowling, table tennis, triathlon, volleyball, and water polo. Viewing of competitions was free for all spectators.

== Opening ceremony ==
The opening ceremony took place at the Waldbühne on July 28, 2015. The main speaker at the event was German President Joachim Gauck who was also the patron of this event. The event was designed by Ran Tzahor and moderated by Palina Rojinski. The traditional Maccabee-fire ceremony was performed by a group of motorcyclists - in memory of the motorcyclists who spread the message of the inaugural Maccabiah around Europe in 1931.
