= Ferrão =

Brazilian futsal player (born 1990)

Personal information
- Full name: Carlos Vagner Gularte Filho
- Date of birth: 29 October 1990 (age 36)
- Place of birth: Chapecó, Brazil
- Height: 1.80 m (5 ft 11 in)
- Position: Pivot

Team information
- Current team: FC Semey
- Number: 11

Senior career*
Years	Team	Apps	(Gls)
2007	Joinville		
2008–2009	Atlântico		
2010	Farroupilha		
2011–2014	MFK Tyumen		
2014–2024	Barcelona	247	(224)
2024–	FC Semey		

International career
- Brazil
- * Club domestic league appearances and goals

Carlos Vagner Gularte Filho (born 29 October 1990), known as Ferrão, is a Brazilian futsal player who plays for FC Semey and the Brazilian national futsal team as a pivot.

== Honours ==
- FIFA Futsal World Cup: 2024
- Primera División: 2018-19, 2020–21, 2021–22
- Copa del Rey: 2017-18, 2018-19, 2019-20
- UEFA Futsal Champions League: Champion: 2019-2020, 2021-2022
- Best Player in the World: 2019, 2020, 2021

== International goals ==
No.	Date	Venue	Opponent	Score	Result	Competition
1.	13 September 2021	Klaipėda, Lithuania	Vietnam	2–0	9–1	2021 FIFA Futsal World Cup
2.	13 September 2021	Klaipėda, Lithuania	Vietnam	3–0	9–1	2021 FIFA Futsal World Cup
3.	13 September 2021	Klaipėda, Lithuania	Vietnam	6–1	9–1	2021 FIFA Futsal World Cup
4.	13 September 2021	Klaipėda, Lithuania	Vietnam	7–1	9–1	2021 FIFA Futsal World Cup
5.	16 September 2021	Klaipėda, Lithuania	Czech Republic	1–0	4–0	2021 FIFA Futsal World Cup
6.	16 September 2021	Klaipėda, Lithuania	Czech Republic	2–0	4–0	2021 FIFA Futsal World Cup
7.	23 September 2021	Kaunas, Lithuania	Japan	1–1	4–2	2021 FIFA Futsal World Cup
8.	29 September 2021	Kaunas, Lithuania	Argentina	1–2	1–2	2021 FIFA Futsal World Cup
9.	3 October 2021	Kaunas, Lithuania	Kazakhstan	3–2	4–2	2021 FIFA Futsal World Cup
10.	31 January 2022	Asunción, Paraguay	Chile	1–0	4–2	2022 Copa América de Futsal
11.	2 February 2022	Asunción, Paraguay	Colombia	1–0	3–0	2022 Copa América de Futsal
12.	5 February 2022	Asunción, Paraguay	Argentina	1–0	1–1 (a.e.t.) (1–2 p)	2022 Copa América de Futsal
13.	6 February 2022	Asunción, Paraguay	Colombia	1–0	3–0	2022 Copa América de Futsal
