= Marcênio =

Brazilian futsal player

Marcênio ribeiro da silva
Personal information
- Full name: Marcênio Ribeiro da Silva.
- Date of birth: 5 October 1987 (age 39)
- Place of birth: Campo Grande, Brazil
- Height: 1.75 m (5 ft 9 in)
- Position: ala

Team information
- Current team: Jaraguá

Senior career*
Years	Team	Apps	(Gls)
2009–2012	Carlos Barbosa		
2013–2018	Gazprom-Ugra Yugorsk	70	(29)
2018–2023	Barcelona	212	(37)
2023	Anderlecht	14	(2)
2024–	Jaraguá	18	(7)

International career
2014–	Brazil	31	(8)
- * Club domestic league appearances and goals as of 12 September 2024

Marcênio Ribeiro da Silva (born 5 October 1987) simply known as Marcênio, is a Brazilian professional futsal player who plays as a winger for the Brazilian club Jaraguá.

== Career ==
Born in Campo Grande, Mato Grosso do Sul, Marcênio began his professional career with Carlos Barbosa, a team with which he won seven titles, with emphasis on the club world cup and the Copa Libertadores in the category. He transferred to Gazprom-Ugra in Russia and was again successful, winning the 2015–16 UEFA Futsal Cup.

In 2018, Marcênio transferred to Barcelona Futsal where he played for 4 seasons and won 16 titles. He played in the second half of 2023 for RSC Anderlecht and in 2024, he returned to Brazil to defend Jaraguá.

With the Brazil futsal team, he was champion of the Grand Prix in 2014, and more recently of the 2024 Copa America, which earned him a call-up to the 2024 FIFA Futsal World Cup.

== Honours ==
Carlos Barbosa

- Liga Nacional de Futsal: 2009
- Taça Brasil de Futsal: 2009
- Copa Libertadores de Futsal: 2011
- Intercontinental Futsal Cup: 2012
- Campeonato Gaúcho de Futsal: 2009, 2010, 2012

Gazprom-Ugra Yugorsk

- UEFA Futsal Cup: 2015–16
- Russian Futsal Super League: 2014–15, 2017–18
- Russian Cup: 2015–16, 2017–18

Barcelona

- UEFA Futsal Champions League: 2019–20, 2021-22
- Primera División de Futsal: 2018–19, 2020–21, 2021–22, 2022–23
- Copa del Rey de Futsal: 2018–19, 2019–20, 2022–23
- Supercopa de España de Futsal: 2019, 2022, 2023
- Copa de España de Futsal: 2019, 2020, 2022
- Catalonia Cup: 2022–23

Jaraguá

- Liga Nacional de Futsal: 2024

Brazil

- FIFA Futsal World Cup: 2024
- Copa América de Futsal: 2024
- Grand Prix de Futsal: 2014
