= KS Ali Demi =

- Full name: Klubi Sportiv Ali Demi
- Founded: 2004; 21 years ago
- Ground: Asllan Rusi Sports Palace
- Capacity: 4,000
- Presidents: Ergys Kadiu; Klodian Kadiu
- League: Albanian Futsal Championship
- 2018–19: 3rd
- Website: http://ksalidemi.al/
Home colours	Away colours

KS Ali Demi is a professional futsal team based in Tirana, Albania, since 2004, and plays in the Albanian Futsal Championship. The club's youth football academy is a partner of Italian club Torino.

== History ==
The club was founded by brothers Ergys and Klodian Kadiu in 2004, initially as a mini football and futsal club. The club is based in the Ali Demi neighbourhood of Tirana, which is where its base, the Ali Demi Sports Complex is situated. The futsal branch of the club was also founded in 2004, ahead of the 2004–05 edition of the Albanian Futsal Championship, in which Ali Demi finished 6th out of 8 teams in Group A, with a record of 6 wins, 2 draws and 6 losses, failing to make the playoffs. In 2005 the club launched its youth football academy for children which would go on to agree a partnership with Torino in September 2016, before becoming an official satellite academy in 2019.

== Honours ==
- Albanian Futsal Championship: 2
  - 2006–07, 2011–12
- Albanian Futsal Cup: 5
  - 2011, 2013, 2014, 2015, 2016
