= Agnebergshallen =

Sports venue in Uddevalla, Sweden

Coordinates: 58°20′50″N 11°56′35″E

Agnebergshallen is an indoor arena for sports events and concerts in Uddevalla, Sweden. The arena, which was inaugurated in 1987, has a capacity for 2.400 during sports events. It is the home arena of both the man and woman section of the handball club Kroppskultur (Kroppskultur Herr, Kroppskultur Dam). Both in the Swedish elite.
