= Sports Palace Tyumen =

Sports venue in Tyumen, Russia

- Sports Palace Tyumen
- Interactive map of Sports Palace Tyumen
- Full name: Sports Palace Tyumen
- Location: Tyumen, Russia
- Coordinates: 57°9′30″N 65°30′48″E
- Capacity: 3,500

Tenant
- Rubin Tyumen

Sports Palace Tyumen is an indoor sporting arena located in Tyumen, Russia. It is used for various indoor events and is the home arena of the Rubin Tyumen of the Russian Major League. The capacity of the arena is 3,500 spectators.
