= Cristian Borruto =

Argentine futsal player (born 1987)

Cristian "Titi" Borruto
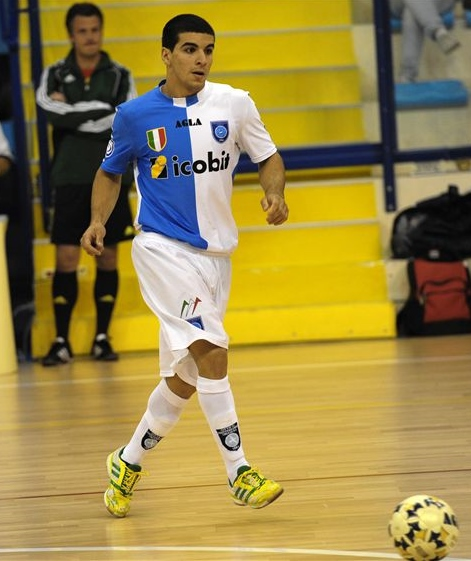

Personal information
- Full name: Cristian Borruto
- Date of birth: 7 June 1987 (age 39)
- Place of birth: Buenos Aires, Argentina
- Height: 1.68 m (5 ft 6 in)
- Position: Winger

Team information
- Current team: Napoli
- Number: 10

Senior career*
Years	Team	Apps	(Gls)
2007–2008	Independiente		
2008–2009	Napoli		
2009–2012	Montesilvano		
2012–2013	Inter Movistar		
2013–2015	Acqua & Sapone		
2015–2018	Pescara		
2018–2022	Italservice		
2022–2023	Boca Juniors		
2023-Current	Napoli		

International career
–	Argentina	58	(23)
Medal record
Representing Argentina
Men's Futsal
FIFA Futsal World Cup
Gold medal – first place	2016 Colombia
FIFA Futsal World Cup
Silver medal – second place	2021 Lithuania
Silver medal – second place	2024 Uzbekistan
- * Club domestic league appearances and goals

Cristian Borruto (born 7 May 1987) is an Argentine futsal player who plays for Napoli and the Argentine national futsal team. He won the FIFA Futsal World Cup in 2016 as captain, and the UEFA Futsal Cup in 2011.

He played five times the FIFA Futsal World Cup. Winning 2016 edition, and getting a bronze medal and a Silver medal too (2021 and 2024).

Borruto also played five Copa America Futsal: winning 2022 and 2024 editions and getting tree silvers. He also played and won FIFA Confederations Cup in 2014.
