= Futsal at the 2009 Asian Indoor Games =

- Venue: Phú Thọ Indoor Stadium; Tân Bình Gymnasium
- Dates: 28 October – 7 November 2009

Futsal at the 2009 Asian Indoor Games was held in Ho Chi Minh City, Vietnam, from 28 October to 7 November. All the women's events were in Tân Bình Gymnasium and the men's were in Phú Thọ Indoor Stadium.

== Medalists ==
| Event | Gold | Silver | Bronze |
|---|---|---|---|
| Men | Iran; Mohammad Mehdi Katebi; Taha Mortazavi; Hamid Ahmadi; Ali Kiaei; Ali Asghar Hassanzadeh; Shahram Sharifzadeh; Masoud Daneshvar; Mostafa Tayyebi; Ahmad Mollaali; Sajjad Bandi; Mehdi Javid; Ahmad Esmaeilpour; Mojtaba Nassirnia; Alireza Samimi | Thailand; Parinya Pandee; Natthapon Suttiroj; Panuwat Janta; Lertchai Issarasuwipakorn; Panomkorn Saisorn; Kritsada Wongkaeo; Tanakorn Santanaprasit; Suphawut Thueanklang; Ekkapong Suratsawang; Ekkapan Suratsawang; Surapong Tompa; Sermphan Khumthinkaew; Kiatiyot Chalarmkhet; Anucha Munjarern | Uzbekistan; Bekzod Khasanov; Dilshod Irsaliev; Nodir Elibaev; Shuhrat Tojiboev; Makhsud Fayzullaev; Jamoliddin Sharipov; Hurshid Tajibaev; Umid Holmatov; Shavkatbek Muhitdinov; Bahodir Ahmedov; Artur Yunusov; Tuychiboy Berdiyev; Fakhriddin Samegov; Leonid Gridnev |
| Women | Japan; Shizuka Kanbara; Ryoko Miyakawa; Yuuki Kozakura; Kana Watanabe; Azumi Fujita; Miru Utsugi; Yui Takahashi; Misato Ino; Junko Yokoyama; Shiori Nakajima; Naomi Eguchi; Sakae Honda; Mai Nagashima; Sayo Kikkawa | Jordan; Misda Ramounieh; Ayat Habeeb; Mira Zakaria; Waed Al-Rawashdeh; Zaina Petro; Stephanie Al-Naber; Abeer Al-Nahar; Farah Al-Azab; Maysa Jbarah; Ala'a Abu Kasheh; Enshirah Al-Hyasat; Shorooq Shathli; Sama'a Khraisat | Thailand; Wannapa Kanha; Pannipa Juijaroen; Jiraprapa Tupsuri; Hataichanok Tappakun; Siriporn Phimphisan; Siranya Srimanee; Orathai Srimanee; Sasicha Phothiwong; Prapasporn Sriroj; Pannipa Kamolrat; Darika Peanpailun; Nipaporn Sriwarom; Pavinee Netthip; Nipa Tiansawang |

== Medal table ==
| Rank | Nation | Gold | Silver | Bronze | Total |
|---|---|---|---|---|---|
| 1 | Iran (IRI) | 1 | 0 | 0 | 1 |
| 1 | Japan (JPN) | 1 | 0 | 0 | 1 |
| 3 | Thailand (THA) | 0 | 1 | 1 | 2 |
| 4 | Jordan (JOR) | 0 | 1 | 0 | 1 |
| 5 | Uzbekistan (UZB) | 0 | 0 | 1 | 1 |
| Totals (5 entries) | | 2 | 2 | 2 | 6 |

== Results ==
=== Men ===
==== Round 1 ====
===== Group A =====
| Pos | Team | Pld | W | D | L | GF | GA | GD | Pts |
|---|---|---|---|---|---|---|---|---|---|
| 1 | Iran | 2 | 2 | 0 | 0 | 32 | 3 | +29 | 6 |
| 2 | Turkmenistan | 2 | 1 | 0 | 1 | 6 | 8 | −2 | 3 |
| 3 | Macau | 2 | 0 | 0 | 2 | 0 | 27 | −27 | 0 |

Source: Futsal Planet
28 October
14:00

| Iran | 8–3 | Turkmenistan |
|---|---|---|
| Hassanzadeh 2', 30'; Daneshvar 2', 25'; Esmaeilpour 10'; Kiaei 16', 21'; Ahmadi 21' | | Ataýew 19' (pen.); Tagaýew 20', 32' |

Phú Thọ Indoor Stadium, Ho Chi Minh City
Referee: Prasert Krutsri (Thailand)

30 October
18:00

| Turkmenistan | 3–0 | Macau |
|---|---|---|
| Tagaýew 8', 35'; Kanaýew 19' |

Phú Thọ Indoor Stadium, Ho Chi Minh City
Referee: Husein Khalaileh (Jordan)

1 November
18:00

| Iran | 24–0 | Macau |
|---|---|---|
| Daneshvar 3', 5', 31', 36'; Javid 7', 19', 27', 29', 37'; Sharifzadeh 9', 10', 20', 36', 38'; Esmaeilpour 10', 18', 27', 30'; Tayyebi 12', 35'; Mortazavi 22'; Bandi 31', 38'; Mollaali 34' |

Phú Thọ Indoor Stadium, Ho Chi Minh City
Referee: Abdulla Mohammed (United Arab Emirates)

===== Group B =====
| Pos | Team | Pld | W | D | L | GF | GA | GD | Pts |
|---|---|---|---|---|---|---|---|---|---|
| 1 | Thailand | 2 | 2 | 0 | 0 | 10 | 4 | +6 | 6 |
| 2 | Japan | 2 | 1 | 0 | 1 | 7 | 6 | +1 | 3 |
| 3 | Tajikistan | 2 | 0 | 0 | 2 | 4 | 11 | −7 | 0 |

Source: Futsal Planet
29 October
14:00

| Thailand | 4–2 | Japan |
|---|---|---|
| Chalarmkhet 13'; Ekkapan Suratsawang 21'; Janta 22'; Thueanklang 37' | | Sugawara 40'; Yokoe 40' |

Phú Thọ Indoor Stadium, Ho Chi Minh City
Referee: Vahid Arzpeima (Iran)

31 October
18:00

| Japan | 5–2 | Tajikistan |
|---|---|---|
| Hatono 12'; Watanabe 16'; Nagashima 17'; Yokoe 30'; Moroe 37' | | Ulmasov 3'; Niyatbekov 32' |

Phú Thọ Indoor Stadium, Ho Chi Minh City
Referee: Husein Khalaileh (Jordan)

2 November
18:00

| Tajikistan | 2–6 | Thailand |
|---|---|---|
| Ulmasov 5'; Jumaev 27' | | Issarasuwipakorn 10'; Suttiroj 14'; Thueanklang 15'; Wongkaeo 15'; Ekkapong Suratsawang 16'; Chalarmkhet 19' |

Phú Thọ Indoor Stadium, Ho Chi Minh City
Referee: Siva Sangkaran Muniady (Malaysia)

===== Group C =====
| Pos | Team | Pld | W | D | L | GF | GA | GD | Pts |
|---|---|---|---|---|---|---|---|---|---|
| 1 | Jordan | 3 | 3 | 0 | 0 | 15 | 7 | +8 | 9 |
| 2 | Malaysia | 3 | 2 | 0 | 1 | 15 | 8 | +7 | 6 |
| 3 | Bahrain | 3 | 0 | 1 | 2 | 10 | 16 | −6 | 1 |
| 4 | Vietnam | 3 | 0 | 1 | 2 | 9 | 18 | −9 | 1 |

Source: Futsal Planet
28 October
16:00

| Vietnam | 2–8 | Malaysia |
|---|---|---|
| Nguyễn Bảo Quân 2', 32' | | Kadir 5', 24'; Haris 8', 32'; Zainuddin 22'; Zainal 26', 26'; Abdul Aziz 36' |

Phú Thọ Indoor Stadium, Ho Chi Minh City
Referee: Naoki Miyatani (Japan)

28 October
18:00

| Jordan | 6–3 | Bahrain |
|---|---|---|
| Abu Arab 11', 19', 35'; Naji 17', 31'; Al-Zuod 28' | | Darwish 9'; Al-Sharqawi 18', 32' |

Phú Thọ Indoor Stadium, Ho Chi Minh City
Referee: Abdolkarim Sistani (Iran)

30 October
14:00

| Bahrain | 4–4 | Vietnam |
|---|---|---|
| Darwish 5', 17', 34'; Abdulla 25' | | Nguyễn Trọng Thiện 25'; Nguyễn Hoàng Giang 25' (pen.); Trương Quốc Tuấn 33', 40' |

Phú Thọ Indoor Stadium, Ho Chi Minh City
Referee: Shukhrat Pulatov (Uzbekistan)

30 October
16:00

| Malaysia | 1–3 | Jordan |
|---|---|---|
| Abdul Aziz 39' | | Aqel 32'; Abu Arab 38'; Samih 40' |

Phú Thọ Indoor Stadium, Ho Chi Minh City
Referee: Prasert Krutsri (Thailand)

1 November
14:00

| Bahrain | 3–6 | Malaysia |
|---|---|---|
| A. Mohamed 5'; Abdulla 15'; Abbas 23' | | Zainal 7', 26'; Haris 8'; Zainuddin 20'; Karnim 31'; Kadir 37' |

Phú Thọ Indoor Stadium, Ho Chi Minh City
Referee: Naoki Miyatani (Japan)

1 November
16:00

| Vietnam | 3–6 | Jordan |
|---|---|---|
| Huỳnh Bá Tuấn 5'; Nguyễn Hoàng Giang 25'; Trương Quốc Tuấn 35' (pen.) | | Al-Zuod 7', 15', 34', 36'; Samih 8'; Abu Arab 12' |

Phú Thọ Indoor Stadium, Ho Chi Minh City
Referee: Vahid Arzpeima (Iran)

===== Group D =====
| Pos | Team | Pld | W | D | L | GF | GA | GD | Pts |
|---|---|---|---|---|---|---|---|---|---|
| 1 | Uzbekistan | 2 | 2 | 0 | 0 | 8 | 2 | +6 | 6 |
| 2 | Kuwait | 2 | 1 | 0 | 1 | 5 | 7 | −2 | 3 |
| 3 | South Korea | 2 | 0 | 0 | 2 | 4 | 8 | −4 | 0 |

Source: Futsal Planet
29 October
18:00

| Kuwait | 4–3 | South Korea |
|---|---|---|
| Al-Turaeji 4'; Al-Asfour 16'; Al-Othman 18'; Mohammad 40' | | Sin Han-kook 15', 19'; Kim Young-gwon 17' |

Phú Thọ Indoor Stadium, Ho Chi Minh City
Referee: Siva Sangkaran Muniady (Malaysia)

31 October
14:00

| South Korea | 1–4 | Uzbekistan |
|---|---|---|
| Kim In-woo 19' | | Fayzullaev 8'; Elibaev 17'; Tajibaev 29'; Irsaliev 37' |

Phú Thọ Indoor Stadium, Ho Chi Minh City
Referee: Mohamad Chami (Lebanon)

2 November
16:00

| Uzbekistan | 4–1 | Kuwait |
|---|---|---|
| Elibaev 3', 3'; Holmatov 13'; Irsaliev 28' | | Al-Mekaimi 36' |

Phú Thọ Indoor Stadium, Ho Chi Minh City
Referee: Rey Ritaga (Philippines)

==== Knockout round ====
Quarterfinals
4 November
Iran | 16
Malaysia | 1
4 November
Jordan | 2
Turkmenistan (a.e.t.) | 3
4 November
Thailand | 7
Kuwait | 4
4 November
Uzbekistan | 5
Japan | 3

Semifinals
5 November
Iran | 13
Turkmenistan | 0
5 November
Thailand | 3
Uzbekistan | 1

Final
7 November
Iran (p) | 3 (5)
Thailand | 3 (4)
Bronze medal match
7 November
Turkmenistan | 0
Uzbekistan | 2

===== Quarterfinals =====
4 November
10:00

| Iran | 16–1 | Malaysia |
|---|---|---|
| Daneshvar 1'; Esmaeilpour 8'; Hassanzadeh 13', 16', 23'; Tayyebi 15', 21', 22'; Sharifzadeh 16', 29'; Javid 16', 30', 30', 38'; Kiaei 18', 20' | | Mohamad 6' |

Phú Thọ Indoor Stadium, Ho Chi Minh City
Referee: Mohamad Chami (Lebanon)

4 November
12:30

| Thailand | 7–4 | Kuwait |
|---|---|---|
| Thueanklang 5'; Janta 11', 35'; Suttiroj 26'; Ekkapong Suratsawang 28', 31', 31' | | Al-Jaser 2'; Aman 13'; Al-Farhoud 18'; Al-Asfour 21' |

Phú Thọ Indoor Stadium, Ho Chi Minh City
Referee: Wadim Baratow (Turkmenistan)

4 November
14:30

| Jordan | 2–3 (a.e.t.) | Turkmenistan |
|---|---|---|
| Naji 1'; Samih 20' | | Ataýew 1', 37'; Kanaýew 43' |

Phú Thọ Indoor Stadium, Ho Chi Minh City
Referee: Prasert Krutsri (Thailand)

4 November
17:00

| Uzbekistan | 5–3 | Japan |
|---|---|---|
| Fayzullaev 16'; Irsaliev 16', 21'; Ahmedov 28'; Yunusov 33' | | Watanabe 14'; Yoshida 27', 40' |

Phú Thọ Indoor Stadium, Ho Chi Minh City
Referee: Siva Sangkaran Muniady (Malaysia)

===== Semifinals =====
5 November
14:30

| Iran | 13–0 | Turkmenistan |
|---|---|---|
| Tayyebi 1', 29'; Esmaeilpour 9'; Kiaei 14', 25'; Sharifzadeh 17', 29'; Bandi 17', 30'; Javid 19'; Mollaali 20'; Hassanzadeh 23', 31' |

Phú Thọ Indoor Stadium, Ho Chi Minh City
Referee: Somsak Littiron (Thailand)

5 November
17:00

| Thailand | 3–1 | Uzbekistan |
|---|---|---|
| Thueanklang 21' (pen.); Suttiroj 31'; Janta 32' | | Ahmedov 39' |

Phú Thọ Indoor Stadium, Ho Chi Minh City
Referee: Abdulla Mohammed (United Arab Emirates)

===== Bronze medal match =====
7 November
14:30

| Turkmenistan | 0–2 | Uzbekistan |
|---|---|---|
| | | Fayzullaev 5'; Muhitdinov 30' |

Phú Thọ Indoor Stadium, Ho Chi Minh City
Referee: Husein Khalaileh (Jordan)

===== Final =====
7 November
17:00

| Iran | 3–3 (a.e.t.) | Thailand |
|---|---|---|
| Javid 10'; Kiaei 24'; Tayyebi 31' | | Saisorn 12'; Thueanklang 28'; Chalarmkhet 28' |
Penalties
| Kiaei (penalty scored); Sharifzadeh (penalty scored); Daneshvar (penalty scored); Hassanzadeh (penalty scored); Esmaeilpour (penalty scored) | 5–4 | (penalty scored) Thueanklang; (penalty scored) Saisorn; (penalty missed) Chalarmkhet; (penalty scored) Janta; (penalty scored) Khumthinkaew |

Phú Thọ Indoor Stadium, Ho Chi Minh City
Referee: Wadim Baratow (Turkmenistan)

=== Women ===
==== Round 1 ====
===== Group A =====
| Pos | Team | Pld | W | D | L | GF | GA | GD | Pts |
|---|---|---|---|---|---|---|---|---|---|
| 1 | Thailand | 3 | 3 | 0 | 0 | 18 | 3 | +15 | 9 |
| 2 | Jordan | 3 | 2 | 0 | 1 | 10 | 7 | +3 | 6 |
| 3 | Vietnam | 3 | 1 | 0 | 2 | 6 | 9 | −3 | 3 |
| 4 | Malaysia | 3 | 0 | 0 | 3 | 2 | 17 | −15 | 0 |

Source: Futsal Planet
28 October
14:00

| Thailand | 6–1 | Vietnam |
|---|---|---|
| Phothiwong 4'; O. Srimanee 7', 22'; S. Srimanee 10'; Phimphisan 28'; Tupsuri 39' | | Đinh Thị Thùy Trang 8' |

Tân Bình Gymnasium, Ho Chi Minh City
Referee: Shukhrat Pulatov (Uzbekistan)

28 October
16:00

| Malaysia | 2–5 | Jordan |
|---|---|---|
| Aishah Noor 35'; Yunus 39' | | Al-Azab 10' (pen.), 21'; Shathli 11'; Al-Hyasat 18'; Al-Nahar 29' |

Tân Bình Gymnasium, Ho Chi Minh City
Referee: Wadim Baratow (Turkmenistan)

30 October
14:00

| Jordan | 2–3 | Thailand |
|---|---|---|
| Al-Rawashdeh 30'; Jbarah 34' | | S. Srimanee 2'; Phothiwong 37'; O. Srimanee 39' |

Tân Bình Gymnasium, Ho Chi Minh City
Referee: Da Fuping (China)

30 October
16:00

| Vietnam | 3–0 | Malaysia |
|---|---|---|
| Nguyễn Thị Lan 8'; Nguyễn Thị Mỹ Kim 26'; Nguyễn Thị Thành 32' |

Tân Bình Gymnasium, Ho Chi Minh City
Referee: Zhu Beiqian (China)

1 November
14:00

| Vietnam | 2–3 | Jordan |
|---|---|---|
| Nguyễn Thị Duyên 25'; Nguyễn Thị Thành 39' | | Al-Naber 8'; Jbarah 9', 26' |

Tân Bình Gymnasium, Ho Chi Minh City
Referee: Somsak Littiron (Thailand)

1 November
16:00

| Thailand | 9–0 | Malaysia |
|---|---|---|
| Tappakun 3'; Peanpailun 11'; O. Srimanee 13', 28', 37'; S. Srimanee 21', 36'; Netthip 33', 38' |

Tân Bình Gymnasium, Ho Chi Minh City
Referee: Zhu Beiqian (China)

===== Group B =====
| Pos | Team | Pld | W | D | L | GF | GA | GD | Pts |
|---|---|---|---|---|---|---|---|---|---|
| 1 | Iran | 2 | 2 | 0 | 0 | 9 | 3 | +6 | 6 |
| 2 | Japan | 2 | 1 | 0 | 1 | 7 | 6 | +1 | 3 |
| 3 | Uzbekistan | 2 | 0 | 0 | 2 | 4 | 11 | −7 | 0 |

Source: Futsal Planet
29 October
14:00

| Japan | 5–3 | Uzbekistan |
|---|---|---|
| Kikkawa 5'; Nakajima 21'; Utsugi 33'; Ahmedova 33' (o.g.); Fujita 38' | | Usmanova 1', 20'; Turapova 21' |

Tân Bình Gymnasium, Ho Chi Minh City
Referee: Mahmoud Al-Matrouk (Kuwait)

31 October
16:00

| Uzbekistan | 1–6 | Iran |
|---|---|---|
| Sarikova 32' | | Gholami 3' (pen.); Zareei 4', 19', 35'; Etedadi 29'; Sadaghianizadeh 37' |

Tân Bình Gymnasium, Ho Chi Minh City
Referee: Prasert Krutsri (Thailand)

2 November
16:00

| Japan | 2–3 | Iran |
|---|---|---|
| Eguchi 10'; Nakajima 17' | | Zareei 7'; Arjangi 15'; Etedadi 38' |

Tân Bình Gymnasium, Ho Chi Minh City
Referee: Ahmad Shehada (Syria)

==== Knockout round ====
Semifinals
4 November
Thailand | 2
Japan | 5
4 November
Iran | 1
Jordan | 2

Final
6 November
Japan | 5
Jordan | 0
Bronze medal match
6 November
Thailand | 5
Iran | 4

===== Semifinals =====
4 November
13:30

| Thailand | 2–5 | Japan |
|---|---|---|
| O. Srimanee 16'; S. Srimanee 30' | | Watanabe 11'; Nakajima 24', 40'; Fujita 27'; Kikkawa 30' |

Tân Bình Gymnasium, Ho Chi Minh City
Referee: Abdulla Mohammed (United Arab Emirates)

4 November
16:00

| Iran | 1–2 | Jordan |
|---|---|---|
| Gholami 35' (pen.) | | Al-Naber 18'; Jbarah 29' |

Tân Bình Gymnasium, Ho Chi Minh City
Referee: Rey Ritaga (Philippines)

===== Bronze medal match =====
6 November
13:30

| Thailand | 5–4 | Iran |
|---|---|---|
| O. Srimanee 12', 18', 34'; Peanpailun 21'; Netthip 35' | | Malmoli 9', 30'; Etedadi 12'; Zareei 23' |

Tân Bình Gymnasium, Ho Chi Minh City
Referee: Ahmad Shehada (Syria)

===== Final =====
6 November
16:00

| Japan | 5–0 | Jordan |
|---|---|---|
| Nakajima 5', 7'; Nagashima 25'; Takahashi 29', 34' |

Tân Bình Gymnasium, Ho Chi Minh City
Referee: Da Fuping (China)

== Goalscorers ==
=== Men ===
11 goals

- Mehdi Javid (IRI)

9 goals

- Shahram Sharifzadeh (IRI)

8 goals

- Mostafa Tayyebi (IRI)

7 goals

- Masoud Daneshvar (IRI)
- Ahmad Esmaeilpour (IRI)
- Ali Asghar Hassanzadeh (IRI)
- Ali Kiaei (IRI)

5 goals

- Ahmad Abu Arab (JOR)
- Mohammad Al-Zuod (JOR)
- Suphawut Thueanklang (THA)

4 goals

- Mohamed Darwish (BRN)
- Sajjad Bandi (IRI)
- Addie Azwan Zainal (MAS)
- Panuwat Janta (THA)
- Ekkapong Suratsawang (THA)
- Elman Tagaýew (TKM)
- Dilshod Irsaliev (UZB)

3 goals

- Mohammad Naji (JOR)
- Samer Samih (JOR)
- Muizzudin Mohd Haris (MAS)
- Qaiser Heshaam Kadir (MAS)
- Kiatiyot Chalarmkhet (THA)
- Natthapon Suttiroj (THA)
- Mergen Ataýew (TKM)
- Nodir Elibaev (UZB)
- Makhsud Fayzullaev (UZB)
- Trương Quốc Tuấn (VIE)

2 goals

- Hani Abdulla (BRN)
- Mohamed Al-Sharqawi (BRN)
- Ahmad Mollaali (IRI)
- Tomoaki Watanabe (JPN)
- Reo Yokoe (JPN)
- Akira Yoshida (JPN)
- Sin Han-kook (KOR)
- Ahmad Al-Asfour (KUW)
- Ruzaley Abdul Aziz (MAS)
- Jamhuri Zainuddin (MAS)
- Alisher Ulmasov (TJK)
- Guwanç Kanaýew (TKM)
- Bahodir Ahmedov (UZB)
- Nguyễn Bảo Quân (VIE)
- Nguyễn Hoàng Giang (VIE)

1 goal

- Abdulla Abbas (BRN)
- Ali Mohamed (BRN)
- Hamid Ahmadi (IRI)
- Taha Mortazavi (IRI)
- Ahmad Aqel (JOR)
- Daisuke Hatono (JPN)
- Kengo Moroe (JPN)
- Shun Nagashima (JPN)
- Kazunori Sugawara (JPN)
- Kim In-woo (KOR)
- Kim Young-gwon (KOR)
- Fahad Al-Farhoud (KUW)
- Omar Al-Jaser (KUW)
- Salem Al-Mekaimi (KUW)
- Hamad Al-Othman (KUW)
- Fahad Al-Turaeji (KUW)
- Salem Aman (KUW)
- Hamzah Mohammad (KUW)
- Fadzil Karnim (MAS)
- Safar Mohamad (MAS)
- Lertchai Issarasuwipakorn (THA)
- Panomkorn Saisorn (THA)
- Ekkapan Suratsawang (THA)
- Kritsada Wongkaeo (THA)
- Sherzod Jumaev (TJK)
- Shamshod Niyatbekov (TJK)
- Umid Holmatov (UZB)
- Shavkatbek Muhitdinov (UZB)
- Hurshid Tajibaev (UZB)
- Artur Yunusov (UZB)
- Huỳnh Bá Tuấn (VIE)
- Nguyễn Trọng Thiện (VIE)

=== Women ===
10 goals

- Orathai Srimanee (THA)

6 goals

- Shiori Nakajima (JPN)

5 goals

- Fahimeh Zareei (IRI)
- Siranya Srimanee (THA)

4 goals

- Maysa Jbarah (JOR)

3 goals

- Fatemeh Etedadi (IRI)
- Pavinee Netthip (THA)

2 goals

- Nasimeh Gholami (IRI)
- Soheila Malmoli (IRI)
- Farah Al-Azab (JOR)
- Stephanie Al-Naber (JOR)
- Azumi Fujita (JPN)
- Sayo Kikkawa (JPN)
- Yui Takahashi (JPN)
- Darika Peanpailun (THA)
- Sasicha Phothiwong (THA)
- Komola Usmanova (UZB)
- Nguyễn Thị Thành (VIE)

1 goal

- Fatemeh Arjangi (IRI)
- Arezoo Sadaghianizadeh (IRI)
- Enshirah Al-Hyasat (JOR)
- Abeer Al-Nahar (JOR)
- Waed Al-Rawashdeh (JOR)
- Shorooq Shathli (JOR)
- Naomi Eguchi (JPN)
- Mai Nagashima (JPN)
- Miru Utsugi (JPN)
- Kana Watanabe (JPN)
- Nurul Aishah Mohd Noor (MAS)
- Shahila Mohd Yunus (MAS)
- Siriporn Phimphisan (THA)
- Hataichanok Tappakun (THA)
- Jiraprapa Tupsuri (THA)
- Makhliyo Sarikova (UZB)
- Makhfuza Turapova (UZB)
- Đinh Thị Thùy Trang (VIE)
- Nguyễn Thị Duyên (VIE)
- Nguyễn Thị Lan (VIE)
- Nguyễn Thị Mỹ Kim (VIE)

1 own goal

- Oliya Ahmedova (UZB) (against JPN)
