= Futsal at the 2007 Asian Indoor Games =

- Venue: Tap Seac Multi-sports Pavilion; IPM Multisport Pavilion
- Dates: 26 October – 3 November 2007

Futsal at the 2007 Asian Indoor Games was held in Macau, China from 26 October to 3 November 2007.

== Medalists ==
Event	Gold	Silver	Bronze
Men	Iran; Mostafa Nazari; Mohammad Mehdi Katebi; Hassan Donyaei; Mostafa Tayyebi; Ali Kiaei; Majid Latifi; Ali Asghar Hassanzadeh; Mohammad Keshavarz; Masoud Daneshvar; Mohammad Taheri; Ahmad Mollaali; Hossein Mahdavinia; Sajjad Bandi; Ebrahim Masoudi	Thailand; Parinya Pandee; Sukrit Rojjanametheesap; Natthapon Suttiroj; Panuwat Janta; Lertchai Issarasuwipakorn; Panomkorn Saisorn; Anucha Munjarern; Prasert Innui; Ekkapong Suratsawang; Ekkapan Suratsawang; Nuttapun Namboonmee; Sermphan Khumthinkaew; Kiatiyot Chalarmkhet; Surapong Tompa	Uzbekistan; Bekzod Khasanov; Bahtiyor Ahunbabaev; Nodir Elibaev; Shuhrat Tojiboev; Shavkat Abduraimov; Javlon Anorov; Shavkatbek Muhitdinov; Umid Ergashev; Hayrullo Hodjimirzaev; Sarvar Akramov; Jamoliddin Sharipov; Muradhodja Azamatov
Women	Japan; Tomomi Mori; Tamaki Morikawa; Yui Takahashi; Ryoko Miyakawa; Shihoko Shinohara; Takako Inada; Azumi Fujita; Hiromi Maki; Sakae Honda; Natsumi Iwasaki; Shiori Nakajima; Yukiko Yoshimoto; Mai Nagashima	Thailand; Wannapa Kanha; Kanyawee Sudtavee; Sasicha Phothiwong; Jiraprapa Tupsuri; Orathai Srimanee; Pavinee Netthip; Nipa Tiansawang; Hathairat Thongsri; Hataichanok Tappakun; Nipaporn Sriwarom; Chownee Phanlert; Prapasporn Sriroj; Siranya Srimanee; Pisayaporn Mokthaisong	Uzbekistan; Elena Belova; Sadokat Ruzieva; Oliya Ahmedova; Maria Moiseeva; Olga Kim; Komola Usmanova; Makhliyo Sarikova; Makhfuza Turapova; Aziza Ermatova; Zebo Juraeva; Nassiba Tursunova; Shakhnoza Shukurova

== Medal table ==
Rank	Nation	Gold	Silver	Bronze	Total
1	Iran (IRI)	1	0	0	1
1	Japan (JPN)	1	0	0	1
3	Thailand (THA)	0	2	0	2
4	Uzbekistan (UZB)	0	0	2	2
Totals (4 entries)		2	2	2	6

== Results ==
=== Men ===
==== Preliminary ====
===== Group A =====
Pos	Team	Pld	W	D	L	GF	GA	GD	Pts
1	Thailand	3	3	0	0	38	5	+33	9
2	Malaysia	3	2	0	1	12	11	+1	6
3	Macau	3	1	0	2	7	14	−7	3
4	Afghanistan	3	0	0	3	5	32	−27	0

Source: RSSSF
26 October
9:00

Thailand	23–2	Afghanistan
Janta 8', 17', 39'; Ekkapong Suratsawang 8', 32'; Suttiroj 12', 13', 15'; Munjarern 15', 38', 39', 40'; Saisorn 16', 27', 37'; Innui 16', 26', 40'; Khumthinkaew 19', 38', 39'; Issarasuwipakorn 26'; Chalarmkhet 30'	Report	A. Ramazani 17'; Naserizada 29'

Tap Seac Multi-sports Pavilion, Macau
Referee: Rey Ritaga (Philippines)

26 October
12:00

Malaysia	5–2	Macau
Zainal 2'; Karnim 5', 15', 32', 34'	Report	Cheung 28'; Leong Chong In 33'

Tap Seac Multi-sports Pavilion, Macau
Referee: Ali Sabah (Iraq)

28 October
13:00

Thailand	7–2	Macau
Janta 11', 18'; Issarasuwipakorn 13', 15'; Ekkapan Suratsawang 33'; Munjarern 35'; Suttiroj 39'	Report	Cheung 24'; Chong Kun Kan 28'

IPM Multisport Pavilion, Macau
Referee: Puji Suprayanadi Ngadiman (Indonesia)

28 October
15:00

Afghanistan	1–6	Malaysia
A. Ramazani 23'	Report	Thayalan 10', 32'; Haris 16', 27'; Abdul Rahim 34', 35'

IPM Multisport Pavilion, Macau
Referee: Husein Khalaileh (Jordan)

30 October
13:00

Thailand	8–1	Malaysia
Janta 8', 37'; Khumthinkaew 12'; Munjarern 14'; Suttiroj 16', 29'; Innui 23'; Issarasuwipakorn 29'	Report	Abdul Rahim 30'

Tap Seac Multi-sports Pavilion, Macau
Referee: Sayfiddin Amanov (Uzbekistan)

30 October
13:00

Macau	3–2	Afghanistan
Leong Chong In 5', 21'; Own goal 40'	Report	Hashemi 34', 35'

IPM Multisport Pavilion, Macau
Referee: Kim Jang-kwan (South Korea)

===== Group B =====
Pos	Team	Pld	W	D	L	GF	GA	GD	Pts
1	Uzbekistan	3	2	1	0	13	2	+11	7
2	Japan	3	2	1	0	5	0	+5	7
3	Vietnam	3	1	0	2	6	10	−4	3
4	Hong Kong	3	0	0	3	2	14	−12	0

Source: RSSSF
26 October
14:00

Uzbekistan	0–0	Japan
	Report

Tap Seac Multi-sports Pavilion, Macau
Referee: Badrul Hisham Kalam (Malaysia)

26 October
16:00

Hong Kong	1–5	Vietnam
So Sheung Kwai 36'	Report	Nguyễn Bảo Quân 16', 39'; Huỳnh Bá Tuấn 23'; Phạm Minh Giang 29'; Huỳnh Đông Kha 40'

Tap Seac Multi-sports Pavilion, Macau
Referee: Kazuya Isokawa (Japan)

28 October
17:00

Uzbekistan	7–1	Vietnam
Muhitdinov 17'; Tojiboev 19'; Ahunbabaev 23', 35'; Own goal 26'; Elibaev 30'; Anorov 39'	Report	Huỳnh Đông Kha 33'

IPM Multisport Pavilion, Macau
Referee: Abdulrahman Abdulqader (Bahrain)

28 October
19:00

Japan	3–0	Hong Kong
Jin 12'; Koike 28'; Matsuura 33'	Report

IPM Multisport Pavilion, Macau
Referee: Ali Sabah (Iraq)

30 October
15:00

Uzbekistan	6–1	Hong Kong
Ahunbabaev 1'; Ergashev 7'; Hodjimirzaev 10', 33', 39'; Elibaev 20'	Report	So Sheung Kwai 13'

Tap Seac Multi-sports Pavilion, Macau
Referee: Husein Khalaileh (Jordan)

30 October
15:00

Vietnam	0–2	Japan
	Report	Yoshinari 3'; Jin 18'

IPM Multisport Pavilion, Macau
Referee: Prakongsuk Kuamala (Thailand)

===== Group C =====
Pos	Team	Pld	W	D	L	GF	GA	GD	Pts
1	Iran	4	4	0	0	41	4	+37	12
2	Lebanon	4	3	0	1	11	12	−1	9
3	Indonesia	4	2	0	2	7	12	−5	6
4	Saudi Arabia	4	1	0	3	15	29	−14	3
5	Kyrgyzstan	4	0	0	4	8	25	−17	0

Source: RSSSF
26 October
9:00

Iran	7–0	Indonesia
Kiaei 8', 33'; Mollaali 20'; Daneshvar 28'; Tayyebi 32'; Masoudi 35'; Hassanzadeh 39'	Report

IPM Multisport Pavilion, Macau
Referee: Mohammad Al-Haddad (Kuwait)

26 October
12:00

Saudi Arabia	2–5	Lebanon
Al-Halail 1', 32'	Report	Atwi 3'; Takaji 4', 31', 37'; Itani 12'

IPM Multisport Pavilion, Macau
Referee: Li Zhizhong (China)

27 October
13:00

Kyrgyzstan	0–1	Lebanon
	Report	Takaji 16'

IPM Multisport Pavilion, Macau
Referee: Abdolkarim Sistani (Iran)

27 October
15:00

Iran	15–1	Saudi Arabia
Taheri 7', 25', 34', 35', 36'; Tayyebi 17', 18', 18'; Daneshvar 18'; Hassanzadeh 18'; Kiaei 20'; Keshavarz 22'; Masoudi 23', 25'; Mollaali 39'	Report	Al-Qarni 11'

Tap Seac Multi-sports Pavilion, Macau
Referee: Jassem Al-Khori (Qatar)

28 October
13:00

Indonesia	4–0	Saudi Arabia
Matulessy 8', 11'; Handoyo 26'; Ladjanibi 31'	Report

Tap Seac Multi-sports Pavilion, Macau
Referee: Sayfiddin Amanov (Uzbekistan)

28 October
15:00

Kyrgyzstan	1–9	Iran
Sundeev 33'	Report	Keshavarz 3'; Kiaei 9', 31'; Hassanzadeh 20', 20', 33'; Daneshvar 25'; Mollaali 33'; Taheri 39'

Tap Seac Multi-sports Pavilion, Macau
Referee: Scott Kidson (Australia)

29 October
17:00

Lebanon	2–10	Iran
Itani 2'; Takaji 28'	Report	Mollaali 9', 28'; Daneshvar 19'; Latifi 22'; Taheri 24'; Masoudi 30', 30'; Hassanzadeh 35', 37'; Tayyebi 36'

Tap Seac Multi-sports Pavilion, Macau
Referee: Scott Kidson (Australia)

29 October
19:00

Indonesia	3–2	Kyrgyzstan
Ihsan 13'; Polnaya 24'; Ladjanibi 38'	Report	Sundeev 34'; Duvanaev 35'

Tap Seac Multi-sports Pavilion, Macau
Referee: Rey Ritaga (Philippines)

30 October
17:00

Saudi Arabia	12–5	Kyrgyzstan
Al-Harbi 6'; Al-Afify 16', 16'; Al-Qarni 16', 18', 36', 36'; Al-Halail 22', 32'; Sharahili 36'; Al-Margb 38'; Al-Shammari 38'	Report	Sundeev 7', 37'; Kadyrov 14'; Sadovsky 18'; Pestryakov 25'

Tap Seac Multi-sports Pavilion, Macau
Referee: Serudin Junaidi (Brunei)

30 October
17:00

Lebanon	3–0	Indonesia
Atwi 4'; Itani 24'; Abou Chaaya 31'	Report

IPM Multisport Pavilion, Macau
Referee: Li Zhizhong (China)

===== Group D =====
Pos	Team	Pld	W	D	L	GF	GA	GD	Pts
1	China	4	4	0	0	28	2	+26	12
2	Tajikistan	4	2	1	1	27	4	+23	7
3	Qatar	4	2	1	1	25	7	+18	7
4	Timor-Leste	4	1	0	3	6	61	−55	3
5	Kuwait	4	0	0	4	0	12	−12	0

Source: RSSSF
26 October
14:00

China	1–0	Tajikistan
Liu Xinyi 15'	Report

IPM Multisport Pavilion, Macau
Referee: Prakongsuk Kuamala (Thailand)

26 October
16:00

Kuwait	0–3 Awarded	Qatar
Al-Nakkas 6', 37'; Al-Asfour 26'; Al-Khalaf 28'; Al-Otaibi 32'	Report	Al-Ahraq 39'

IPM Multisport Pavilion, Macau
Referee: Abdulrahman Abdulqader (Bahrain)

27 October
17:00

Timor-Leste	1–19	Qatar
da Costa 26'	Report	Al-Ahraq 3', 14', 15'; Ah. Al-Baloshi 7', 25'; Al-Marri 7', 37', 37', 38'; Al-Subaey 17', 20', 27', 28'; Ab. Al-Baloshi 18', 29'; Attef 19'; Al-Fayadh 24', 37', 40'

Tap Seac Multi-sports Pavilion, Macau
Referee: Fadi El-Kareh (Lebanon)

27 October
19:00

China	3–0 Awarded	Kuwait
Li Xin 16'; Zhang Xiao 19'; Liang Shuang 22', 24'; Liu Xinyi 29'	Report	Al-Nakkas 35'

Tap Seac Multi-sports Pavilion, Macau
Referee: Alireza Sohrabi (Iran)

28 October
17:00

Tajikistan	3–0 Awarded	Kuwait
Jumaev 5', 26'; Ismoilov 10'; Ulmasov 15'; Faizullaev 35'; Burov 38'; Khojaev 39'	Report	Al-Enezi 1'; Al-Ajmi 39'

Tap Seac Multi-sports Pavilion, Macau
Referee: Nurdin Bukuev (Kyrgyzstan)

28 October
19:00

Timor-Leste	1–20	China
Leong 23'	Report	Liu Xinyi 3', 16', 17', 23', 36', 40'; Wu Zhuoxi 16', 40'; Zhang Jiong 19'; Wang Wei 22', 24', 37'; Hu Jie 26', 39'; Zhang Xiao 28', 30'; Chen Fangjing 29', 32'; Li Jian 34'; Zhang Xi 34'

Tap Seac Multi-sports Pavilion, Macau
Referee: Fadi El-Kareh (Lebanon)

29 October
17:00

Qatar	1–4	China
Ah. Al-Baloshi 25'	Report	Liu Xinyi 10', 11'; Wang Wei 13'; Zhang Xi 16'

IPM Multisport Pavilion, Macau
Referee: Kazuya Isokawa (Japan)

29 October
19:00

Tajikistan	22–1	Timor-Leste
Ismoilov 1', 3', 4', 31'; Jumaev 4', 20', 31', 32', 33'; Almukhamedov 7', 11', 21', 23'; Davlatbekov 8', 25', 37'; Ulmasov 11', 29'; Khojaev 18', 36', 40'; Faizullaev 24'	Report	Ximenes 12'

IPM Multisport Pavilion, Macau
Referee: Puji Suprayanadi Ngadiman (Indonesia)

30 October
19:00

Kuwait	0–3 Awarded	Timor-Leste
	Report

Tap Seac Multi-sports Pavilion, Macau
Referee: Jassem Al-Khori (Qatar)

30 October
19:00

Qatar	2–2	Tajikistan
Al-Mohannadi 5'; Adel 33'	Report	Jumaev 32', 34'

IPM Multisport Pavilion, Macau
Referee: Siva Sangkaran Muniady (Malaysia)
- Kuwait was disqualified from the tournament on 29 October after Kuwait Football Association was suspended by FIFA.

==== Knockout round ====
Quarterfinals
1 November
Thailand	2
Japan	1
1 November
Uzbekistan	6
Malaysia	1
1 November
Iran	18
Tajikistan	3
1 November
China (p)	5 (4)
Lebanon	5 (2)

Semifinals
2 November
Thailand	4
Uzbekistan	1
2 November
Iran	7
China	1

Gold medal match
3 November
Thailand	4
Iran	7
Bronze medal match
3 November
Uzbekistan	3
China	2

===== Quarterfinals =====
1 November
16:00

Uzbekistan	6–1	Malaysia
Muhitdinov 8', 15'; Ergashev 12', 18'; Elibaev 16'; Anorov 23'	Report	Zainal 39'

Tap Seac Multi-sports Pavilion, Macau
Referee: Ali Sabah (Iraq)

1 November
18:00

Iran	18–3	Tajikistan
Daneshvar 1', 3', 22'; Taheri 5', 33'; Tayyebi 6', 7'; Mollaali 8', 19', 28', 28'; Hassanzadeh 9', 27', 40'; Kiaei 13', 19', 39'; Latifi 35'	Report	Khojaev 1', 31'; Jumaev 12'

Tap Seac Multi-sports Pavilion, Macau
Referee: Rey Ritaga (Philippines)

1 November
20:00

China	5–5 (a.e.t.)	Lebanon
Li Jian 17', 49'; Zhang Xiao 22'; Li Xin 32'; Zhang Xi 37'	Report	Atwi 11', 25', 34'; Takaji 38', 46'
Penalties
Wu Zhuoxi (penalty missed); Zhang Xi (penalty scored); Zhang Xiao (penalty scored); Wang Wei (penalty scored); Li Xin (penalty scored)	4–2	(penalty scored) Abou Chaaya; (penalty scored) Itani; (penalty missed) Aboutaam; (penalty missed) Takaji

Tap Seac Multi-sports Pavilion, Macau
Referee: Abdolkarim Sistani (Iran)

1 November
22:00

Thailand	2–1	Japan
Munjarern 4', 40'	Report	Yoshinari 39'

Tap Seac Multi-sports Pavilion, Macau
Referee: Li Zhizhong (China)

===== Semifinals =====
2 November
17:00

Iran	7–1	China
Bandi 4'; Daneshvar 17'; Tayyebi 18', 26'; Hassanzadeh 20'; Masoudi 21'; Mollaali 28'	Report	Wu Zhuoxi 33'

Tap Seac Multi-sports Pavilion, Macau
Referee: Abdulrahman Abdulqader (Bahrain)

2 November
19:00

Thailand	4–1	Uzbekistan
Munjarern 2'; Khumthinkaew 8'; Ekkapong Suratsawang 13'; Innui 38'	Report	Muhitdinov 1'

Tap Seac Multi-sports Pavilion, Macau
Referee: Kim Jang-kwan (South Korea)

===== Bronze medal match =====
3 November
13:00

Uzbekistan	3–2	China
Sharipov 8'; Elibaev 9'; Tojiboev 33'	Report	Wang Wei 7'; Liu Xinyi 19'

Tap Seac Multi-sports Pavilion, Macau
Referee: Badrul Hisham Kalam (Malaysia)

===== Gold medal match =====
3 November
15:00

Thailand	4–7	Iran
Khumthinkaew 12'; Munjarern 17'; Innui 34'; Saisorn 39'	Report	Taheri 5', 12', 15'; Hassanzadeh 6'; Latifi 16'; Daneshvar 21'; Kiaei 37'

Tap Seac Multi-sports Pavilion, Macau
Referee: Kazuya Isokawa (Japan)

=== Women ===
==== Preliminary ====
===== Group A =====
Pos	Team	Pld	W	D	L	GF	GA	GD	Pts
1	Japan	3	3	0	0	15	8	+7	9
2	Thailand	3	2	0	1	27	5	+22	6
3	Iran	3	1	0	2	21	16	+5	3
4	Malaysia	3	0	0	3	1	35	−34	0

Source: RSSSF
27 October
15:00

Iran	13–1	Malaysia
Meisami 2', 3', 21', 24', 27'; Rezazadeh 13'; Zareei 19', 39'; Ziv. Babaei 23'; Armat 25'; Zib. Babaei 31'; Hosseini 32'; Rouhani 33'	Report	Yunus 14'

IPM Multisport Pavilion, Macau
Referee: Serudin Junaidi (Brunei)

27 October
17:00

Thailand	2–3	Japan
Tappakun 35'; Phothiwong 38'	Report	Maki 4'; Inada 26'; Fujita 29'

IPM Multisport Pavilion, Macau
Referee: Kim Jang-kwan (South Korea)

28 October
10:00

Japan	7–6	Iran
Fujita 1'; Nakajima 2', 4'; Morikawa 12', 36'; Takahashi 28', 38'	Report	Zib. Babaei 16'; Karimipour 17'; Zareei 20'; Meisami 22', 23'; Rezazadeh 39'

Tap Seac Multi-sports Pavilion, Macau
Referee: Siva Sangkaran Muniady (Malaysia)

28 October
10:00

Thailand	17–0	Malaysia
Phothiwong 3', 32', 35'; Tupsuri 3', 20'; O. Srimanee 8', 14', 22', 32'; Tiansawang 10'; Sriwarom 15', 17'; Tappakun 24', 26'; Phanlert 26', 40'; Netthip 38'	Report

IPM Multisport Pavilion, Macau
Referee: Wong Yuen Chi (Hong Kong)

29 October
15:00

Iran	2–8	Thailand
Meisami 22'; Zareei 23'	Report	O. Srimanee 4', 16'; Phothiwong 7', 24', 31'; Sriwarom 28'; Thongsri 37', 40'

Tap Seac Multi-sports Pavilion, Macau
Referee: Badrul Hisham Kalam (Malaysia)

29 October
15:00

Malaysia	0–5	Japan
	Report	Morikawa 4', 17'; Fujita 5', 31'; Miyakawa 14'

IPM Multisport Pavilion, Macau
Referee: Abdolkarim Sistani (Iran)

===== Group B =====
Pos	Team	Pld	W	D	L	GF	GA	GD	Pts
1	Uzbekistan	2	1	1	0	11	5	+6	4
2	Vietnam	2	1	1	0	10	7	+3	4
3	Philippines	2	0	0	2	4	13	−9	0

Source: RSSSF
27 October
19:00

Vietnam	4–4	Uzbekistan
Phùng Thị Minh Nguyệt 3'; Nguyễn Thị Thu Huyền 19'; Nguyễn Thị Duyên 34'; Lưu Ngọc Mai 37'	Report	Usmanova 9', 10'; Ahmedova 14'; Sarikova 28'

IPM Multisport Pavilion, Macau
Referee: Kayumars Sulaymonov (Tajikistan)

28 October
13:00

Philippines	3–6	Vietnam
Ninobla 15'; Ariel 23'; Servillon 26'	Report	Phùng Thị Minh Nguyệt 8', 10', 18', 36', 38'; Nguyễn Tâm Thu 11'

IPM Multisport Pavilion, Macau
Referee: Jassem Al-Khori (Qatar)

30 October
10:00

Uzbekistan	7–1	Philippines
Moiseeva 2', 14'; Turapova 12', 16'; Usmanova 16', 22', 22'	Report	Ninobla 7'

Tap Seac Multi-sports Pavilion, Macau
Referee: Alireza Sohrabi (Iran)

==== Placing ====
Pos	Team	Pld	W	D	L	GF	GA	GD	Pts
1	Iran	2	2	0	0	35	4	+31	6
2	Philippines	2	1	0	1	7	20	−13	3
3	Malaysia	2	0	0	2	4	22	−18	0

Source: RSSSF
31 October
10:00

Malaysia	2–5	Philippines
Aishah Noor 32'; Yunus 40'	Report	Merlin 3', 17', 18'; Servillon 18'; Ruffy 28'

Tap Seac Multi-sports Pavilion, Macau
Referee: Kim Jang-kwan (South Korea)

1 November
10:00

Iran	17–2	Malaysia
Meisami 2', 4', 28'; Armat 2'; Zareei 11', 13', 27', 31'; Rezazadeh 12', 26'; Karimipour 12', 29', 31', 33'; Hosseini 38'; Eghbali 39', 40'	Report	Gill 27'; Azlina Mohd 33'

Tap Seac Multi-sports Pavilion, Macau
Referee: Jassem Al-Khori (Qatar)

2 November
10:00

Philippines	2–18	Iran
Ninobla 14', 31'	Report	Meisami 4', 16', 16', 17', 23', 35', 37', 39'; Zareei 6', 8', 22', 27', 37'; Rezazadeh 27', 29'; Armat 30'; Ziv. Babaei 37'; Karimipour 38'

Tap Seac Multi-sports Pavilion, Macau
Referee: Sayfiddin Amanov (Uzbekistan)

==== Knockout round ====
Semifinals
2 November
Japan	6
Vietnam	1
2 November
Uzbekistan	1
Thailand	2

Gold medal match
3 November
Japan (p)	2 (3)
Thailand	2 (1)
Bronze medal match
3 November
Vietnam	1
Uzbekistan (a.e.t.)	2

===== Semifinals =====
2 November
13:00

Japan	6–1	Vietnam
Nakajima 6', 38'; Fujita 14'; Inada 18', 24'; Maki 21'	Report	Phan Thị Anh Đào 23'

Tap Seac Multi-sports Pavilion, Macau
Referee: Puji Suprayanadi Ngadiman (Indonesia)

2 November
15:00

Uzbekistan	1–2	Thailand
Sarikova 31'	Report	Tappakun 13'; Sriwarom 39'

Tap Seac Multi-sports Pavilion, Macau
Referee: Scott Kidson (Australia)

===== Bronze medal match =====
3 November
9:00

Vietnam	1–2 (a.e.t.)	Uzbekistan
Nguyễn Thị Thu Huyền 17'	Report	Usmanova 40', 47'

Tap Seac Multi-sports Pavilion, Macau
Referee: Li Zhizhong (China)

===== Gold medal match =====
3 November
11:00

Japan	2–2 (a.e.t.)	Thailand
Morikawa 34'; Nakajima 35'	Report	Sriwarom 22'; O. Srimanee 38'
Penalties
Fujita (penalty scored); Takahashi (penalty missed); Nakajima (penalty scored); Inada (penalty scored)	3–1	(penalty scored) Tupsuri; (penalty missed) O. Srimanee; (penalty missed) Sriwarom; (penalty missed) Phanlert

Tap Seac Multi-sports Pavilion, Macau
Referee: Ali Sabah (Iraq)

== Goalscorers ==
=== Men ===
12 goals

- Ali Asghar Hassanzadeh (IRI)
- Mohammad Taheri (IRI)

10 goals

- Liu Xinyi (CHN)
- Ahmad Mollaali (IRI)
- Anucha Munjarern (THA)

9 goals

- Masoud Daneshvar (IRI)
- Ali Kiaei (IRI)
- Mostafa Tayyebi (IRI)

8 goals

- Sherzod Jumaev (TJK)

7 goals

- Khaled Takaji (LIB)
- Panuwat Janta (THA)

6 goals

- Ebrahim Masoudi (IRI)
- Prasert Innui (THA)
- Sermphan Khumthinkaew (THA)
- Natthapon Suttiroj (THA)

5 goals

- Wang Wei (CHN)
- Aqeal Al-Qarni (KSA)
- Hayssam Atwi (LIB)
- Rustam Khojaev (TJK)

4 goals

- Mihail Sundeev (KGZ)
- Mohammed Al-Halail (KSA)
- Fadzil Karnim (MAS)
- Mohamed Al-Marri (QAT)
- Hassen Al-Subaey (QAT)
- Lertchai Issarasuwipakorn (THA)
- Panomkorn Saisorn (THA)
- Sergey Almukhamedov (TJK)
- Obidjon Ismoilov (TJK)
- Nodir Elibaev (UZB)
- Shavkatbek Muhitdinov (UZB)

3 goals

- Li Jian (CHN)
- Wu Zhuoxi (CHN)
- Zhang Xi (CHN)
- Zhang Xiao (CHN)
- Majid Latifi (IRI)
- Mahmoud Itani (LIB)
- Leong Chong In (MAC)
- Ahmad Rizal Abdul Rahim (MAS)
- Mohsin Al-Ahraq (QAT)
- Ahmed Gholam Al-Baloshi (QAT)
- Ahmad Al-Fayadh (QAT)
- Uvaydo Davlatbekov (TJK)
- Ekkapong Suratsawang (THA)
- Bahtiyor Ahunbabaev (UZB)
- Umid Ergashev (UZB)
- Hayrullo Hodjimirzaev (UZB)

2 goals

- Mustafa Hashemi (AFG)
- Amanullah Ramazani (AFG)
- Chen Fangjing (CHN)
- Hu Jie (CHN)
- So Sheung Kwai (HKG)
- Jaelani Ladjanibi (INA)
- Socrates Matulessy (INA)
- Mohammad Keshavarz (IRI)
- Keiji Jin (JPN)
- Kei Yoshinari (JPN)
- Mohammed Al-Afify (KSA)
- Geofredo Cheung (MAC)
- Muizzudin Mohd Haris (MAS)
- Thayalan Kandasamy (MAS)
- Addie Azwan Zainal (MAS)
- Abdulla Gholam Al-Baloshi (QAT)
- Alisher Ulmasov (TJK)
- Javlon Anorov (UZB)
- Shuhrat Tojiboev (UZB)
- Huỳnh Đông Kha (VIE)
- Nguyễn Bảo Quân (VIE)

1 goal

- Taleb Reza Naserizada (AFG)
- Li Xin (CHN)
- Zhang Jiong (CHN)
- Deny Handoyo (INA)
- Maulana Muhammad Ihsan (INA)
- Viernes Ricardo Polnaya (INA)
- Sajjad Bandi (IRI)
- Ryohei Koike (JPN)
- Ei Matsuura (JPN)
- Marat Duvanaev (KGZ)
- Dilshat Kadyrov (KGZ)
- Andrey Pestryakov (KGZ)
- Sergey Sadovsky (KGZ)
- Fuad Al-Harbi (KSA)
- Faisal Al-Margb (KSA)
- Salman Al-Shammari (KSA)
- Ali Sharahili (KSA)
- Rabih Abou Chaaya (LIB)
- Chong Kun Kan (MAC)
- Sobhi Adel (QAT)
- Saad Al-Mohannadi (QAT)
- Yousef Ahmed Attef (QAT)
- Kiatiyot Chalarmkhet (THA)
- Ekkapan Suratsawang (THA)
- Firdavs Faizullaev (TJK)
- Filipe Victor da Costa (TLS)
- Roger Leong (TLS)
- Angelino Ximenes (TLS)
- Jamoliddin Sharipov (UZB)
- Huỳnh Bá Tuấn (VIE)
- Phạm Minh Giang (VIE)

=== Women ===
19 goals

- Zohreh Meisami (IRI)

13 goals

- Fahimeh Zareei (IRI)

7 goals

- Sasicha Phothiwong (THA)
- Orathai Srimanee (THA)
- Komola Usmanova (UZB)

6 goals

- Azizeh Karimipour (IRI)
- Masoumeh Rezazadeh (IRI)
- Phùng Thị Minh Nguyệt (VIE)

5 goals

- Azumi Fujita (JPN)
- Tamaki Morikawa (JPN)
- Shiori Nakajima (JPN)
- Nipaporn Sriwarom (THA)

4 goals

- Shella Ninobla (PHI)
- Hataichanok Tappakun (THA)

3 goals

- Elnaz Armat (IRI)
- Takako Inada (JPN)
- Miriam Merlin (PHI)

2 goals

- Ziba Babaei (IRI)
- Zivar Babaei (IRI)
- Leila Eghbali (IRI)
- Maryam Hosseini (IRI)
- Hiromi Maki (JPN)
- Yui Takahashi (JPN)
- Shahila Mohd Yunus (MAS)
- Angelita Servillon (PHI)
- Chownee Phanlert (THA)
- Hathairat Thongsri (THA)
- Jiraprapa Tupsuri (THA)
- Maria Moiseeva (UZB)
- Makhliyo Sarikova (UZB)
- Makhfuza Turapova (UZB)
- Nguyễn Thị Thu Huyền (VIE)

1 goal

- Maryam Rouhani (IRI)
- Ryoko Miyakawa (JPN)
- Raveena Gill (MAS)
- Nurul Azlina Mohd (MAS)
- Nurul Aishah Mohd Noor (MAS)
- Marigen Ariel (PHI)
- Francine Grace Ruffy (PHI)
- Pavinee Netthip (THA)
- Nipa Tiansawang (THA)
- Oliya Ahmedova (UZB)
- Lưu Ngọc Mai (VIE)
- Nguyễn Tâm Thu (VIE)
- Nguyễn Thị Duyên (VIE)
- Phan Thị Anh Đào (VIE)
