= 2007 AFC Futsal Championship =

2007 AFCフットサル選手権

Tournament details
- Host country: Japan
- Dates: 13–19 May
- Teams: 16 (from 1 confederation)
- Venue: 2 (in 2 host cities)

Final positions
- Champions: Iran (8th title)
- Runners-up: Japan
- Third place: Uzbekistan
- Fourth place: Kyrgyzstan

Tournament statistics
- Matches played: 32
- Goals scored: 234 (7.31 per match)
- Attendance: 17,942 (561 per match)
- Top scorer: (Japan) Kenichiro Kogure (12 goals)
- Best player: (Iran) Vahid Shamsaei

The 2007 AFC Futsal Championship was held in Osaka and Amagasaki, Japan from 13 to 19 May 2007.

== Venues ==
Osaka	Amagasaki
Osaka Municipal Central Gymnasium	Commemoration Park Gymnasium
Capacity: 8,200	Capacity: Unknown

== Draw ==
The draw for the 2007 AFC Futsal Championship was held on 11 April 2007 in Tokyo, Japan.

Pot 1	Pot 2	Pot 3	Pot 4
Iran; Japan; Kyrgyzstan; Uzbekistan	Australia; China; Tajikistan; Thailand	Hong Kong; Kuwait; Malaysia; Turkmenistan	Iraq; South Korea; Lebanon; Philippines

== Group stage ==
=== Group A ===
Team	Pld	W	D	L	GF	GA	GD	Pts
Japan	3	3	0	0	30	2	+28	9
Tajikistan	3	1	1	1	10	12	−2	4
Hong Kong	3	1	0	2	7	16	−9	3
Philippines	3	0	1	2	4	21	−17	1

13 May 2007
13:00

Japan	16–0	Philippines
Kogure 5', 14', 23'; Kanayama 9', 22'; Kishimoto 13'; Suzumura 15', 16', 24', 33'; Koyama 18', 32'; Komiyama 29'; Kitahara 31'; Higa 34'; Ono 37'	Report

Municipal Central Gymnasium, Osaka
Attendance: 1,550
Referee: Li Zhizhong (China)

13 May 2007
19:00

Tajikistan	6–4	Hong Kong
Faizullaev 2'; Khojaev 2', 30'; S. Jumaev 11', 33'; Ulmasov 38'	Report	Chu Kwok Leung 4'; So Sheung Kwai 8'; Kwok Yue Hung 10', 21'

Municipal Central Gymnasium, Osaka
Attendance: 50
Referee: Kim Jang-kwan (South Korea)

14 May 2007
17:00

Philippines	2–2	Tajikistan
Zerrudo 25', 33'	Report	S. Jumaev 12'; Ulmasov 14'

Municipal Central Gymnasium, Osaka
Attendance: 50
Referee: Abdulrahman Abdulqader (Bahrain)

14 May 2007
19:00

Hong Kong	0–8	Japan
	Report	Fujii 4', 12', 19'; Kanayama 8', 23'; Kogure 11', 31'; Komiyama 35'

Municipal Central Gymnasium, Osaka
Attendance: 200
Referee: Manouchehr Nazari (Iran)

15 May 2007
19:00

Japan	6–2	Tajikistan
Kogure 1', 3'; Komiyama 12', 35'; Ono 30', 33'	Report	S. Jumaev 13'; Davlatbekov 38'

Municipal Central Gymnasium, Osaka
Attendance: 700
Referee: Mohammad Al-Haddad (Kuwait)

15 May 2007
19:00

Hong Kong	3–2	Philippines
So Sheung Kwai 1'; So Loi Keung 8'; Lo Kwan Yee 32'	Report	Nejadsafavi 32', 33'

Commemoration Park Gymnasium, Amagasaki
Attendance: 119
Referee: Scott Kidson (Australia)

=== Group B ===
Team	Pld	W	D	L	GF	GA	GD	Pts
Uzbekistan	3	2	0	1	8	5	+3	6
Thailand	3	2	0	1	17	7	+10	6
Kuwait	3	1	0	2	5	14	−9	3
Iraq	3	1	0	2	9	13	−4	3

May 13 May 2007
15:00

Thailand	8–0	Kuwait
Ekkapan Suratsawang 6'; Issarasuwipakorn 10'; Munjarern 13', 22'; Khumthinkaew 16'; Innui 21'; Janta 25'; Ekkapong Suratsawang 32'	Report

Municipal Central Gymnasium, Osaka
Attendance: 300
Referee: Shinichi Hirano (Japan)

13 May 2007
17:00

Uzbekistan	1–3	Iraq
Buriev 40'	Report	Abd-Ali 23'; Khalid 31', 32'

Municipal Central Gymnasium, Osaka
Attendance: 100
Referee: Badrul Hisham Kalam (Malaysia)

14 May 2007
13:00

Iraq	4–7	Thailand
Khalid 20'; Abd-Ali 24'; Ghazi 27'; Khalil 35'	Report	Ekkapan Suratsawang 10', 11', 18'; Janta 15', 32'; Khumthinkaew 25'; Ekkapong Suratsawang 34'

Municipal Central Gymnasium, Osaka
Attendance: 50
Referee: Kazuya Isokawa (Japan)

14 May 2007
15:00

Kuwait	0–4	Uzbekistan
	Report	Buriev 12', 37'; Yusupdjanov 14'; Zakirov 38'

Municipal Central Gymnasium, Osaka
Attendance: 50
Referee: Karim Sistani (Iran)

15 May 2007
15:00

Uzbekistan	3–2	Thailand
Buriev 8', 28'; Tajibaev 29'	Report	Janta 30'; Ekkapong Suratsawang 39'

Municipal Central Gymnasium, Osaka
Attendance: 50
Referee: Badrul Hisham Kalam (Malaysia)

15 May 2007
15:00

Kuwait	5–2	Iraq
Al-Othman 10', 35'; Al-Otaibi 22', 37'; Al-Nagi 40'	Report	Ghazi 12'; Abbas 36'

Commemoration Park Gymnasium, Amagasaki
Attendance: 101
Referee: Christopher Colley (Australia)

=== Group C ===
Team	Pld	W	D	L	GF	GA	GD	Pts
Kyrgyzstan	3	2	1	0	14	7	+7	7
Australia	3	1	1	1	6	5	+1	4
South Korea	3	1	0	2	9	9	0	3
Turkmenistan	3	1	0	2	4	12	−8	3

13 May 2007
13:00

Kyrgyzstan	4–3	South Korea
Abdyraimov 4', 18'; Djetybaev 8'; Duvanaev 21'	Report	Mamatov 1' (o.g.); Jeun Jun-young 17'; Lee Jong-yun 34'

Commemoration Park Gymnasium, Amagasaki
Attendance: 148
Referee: Prakongsuk Kuamala (Thailand)

13 May 2007
15:00

Australia	0–1	Turkmenistan
	Report	Tagayev 10'

Commemoration Park Gymnasium, Amagasaki
Attendance: 201
Referee: Mohammad Al-Haddad (Kuwait)

14 May 2007
13:00

South Korea	1–3	Australia
Lee Jong-yun 25'	Report	Whyte 33', 40'; Wright 39'

Commemoration Park Gymnasium, Amagasaki
Attendance: 186
Referee: Mutrif Al-Qahtani (Saudi Arabia)

14 May 2007
15:00

Turkmenistan	1–7	Kyrgyzstan
Resulov 4'	Report	Abdyraimov 5'; Djetybaev 14'; Ryskulov 17'; Duvanaev 17'; Cherevin 18'; Mendibaev 22'; Mamatov 29'

Commemoration Park Gymnasium, Amagasaki
Attendance: 126
Referee: Ali Sabah (Iraq)

15 May 2007
13:00

Kyrgyzstan	3–3	Australia
Mamatov 26', 39'; Djetybaev 33'	Report	Vizzari 5'; Haydon 22'; Wright 26'

Municipal Central Gymnasium, Osaka
Attendance: 50
Referee: Kazuya Isokawa (Japan)

15 May 2007
13:00

Turkmenistan	2–5	South Korea
Kanayev 28'; Orazov 40'	Report	Back Hyung-do 20', 24', 25'; Choi Yong-sun 39'; Kim In-woo 39'

Commemoration Park Gymnasium, Amagasaki
Attendance: 81
Referee: Manouchehr Nazari (Iran)

=== Group D ===
Team	Pld	W	D	L	GF	GA	GD	Pts
Iran	3	3	0	0	31	5	+26	9
Lebanon	3	2	0	1	17	12	+5	6
China	3	1	0	2	4	12	−8	3
Malaysia	3	0	0	3	3	26	−23	0

13 May 2007
17:00

Iran	8–4	Lebanon
Taheri 6', 13', 32'; Asghari 12'; Shamsaei 17'; Heidarian 23'; Hashemzadeh 30'; Latifi 39'	Report	Atwi 6', 7', 36'; Abou-Chaaya 19'

Commemoration Park Gymnasium, Amagasaki
Attendance: 304
Referee: Christopher Colley (Australia)

13 May 2007
19:00

China	2–0	Malaysia
Li Xin 26'; Zhang Jiong 38'	Report

Commemoration Park Gymnasium, Amagasaki
Attendance: 144
Referee: Jassem Al-Khori (Qatar)

14 May 2007
17:00

Lebanon	4–2	China
Takaji 11', 29'; Itani 15'; Said 34'	Report	Zhang Xiao 19'; Hu Jie 27'

Commemoration Park Gymnasium, Amagasaki
Attendance: 150
Referee: Nurdin Bukuev (Kyrgyzstan)

14 May 2007
19:00

Malaysia	1–15	Iran
Fa. Karnim 28'	Report	Latifi 1'; Hashemzadeh 4', 14', 24'; Pariazar 5', 34'; Shamsaei 16', 17', 30', 31', 35', 40'; Mohammadi 17', 27'; Zahmatkesh 40'

Commemoration Park Gymnasium, Amagasaki
Attendance: 202
Referee: Scott Kidson (Australia)

15 May 2007
17:00

Iran	8–0	China
Asghari 7', 30'; Mohammadi 17'; Masoumi 24'; Taheri 34'; Zahmatkesh 36'; Hashemzadeh 38'; Pariazar 40'	Report

Municipal Central Gymnasium, Osaka
Attendance: 500
Referee: Shinichi Hirano (Japan)

15 May 2007
17:00

Malaysia	2–9	Lebanon
Fa. Karnim 11'; Fe. Karnim 17'	Report	Takaji 2', 5', 31'; Abou-Chaaya 4', 11'; Atwi 32'; Kharma 34'; Itani 38'; Iskandarani 40'

Commemoration Park Gymnasium, Amagasaki
Attendance: 152
Referee: Mutrif Al-Qahtani (Saudi Arabia)

== Knockout stage ==
Quarter-finals
May 17 – Osaka
Uzbekistan	3
Tajikistan	1
May 17 – Amagasaki
Iran	8
Australia	0
May 17 – Osaka
Japan	9
Thailand	6
May 17 – Amagasaki
Kyrgyzstan (aet)	3
Lebanon	2

Semi-finals
May 18 – Osaka
Uzbekistan	3
Iran	7
May 18 – Osaka
Japan	1
Kyrgyzstan	0

Final
May 19 – Osaka
Iran	4
Japan	1
Third place
May 19 – Osaka
Uzbekistan	5
Kyrgyzstan	3

=== Quarter-finals ===
17 May 2007
17:00

Uzbekistan	3–1	Tajikistan
Odushev 8'; Buriev 9', 40'	Report	Faizullaev 23'

Municipal Central Gymnasium, Osaka
Attendance: 100
Referee: Ali Sabah (Iraq)

17 May 2007
17:00

Iran	8–0	Australia
Latifi 15', 37'; Hashemzadeh 16', 35', 36'; Masoumi 17'; Shamsaei 27', 31'	Report

Commemoration Park Gymnasium, Amagasaki
Attendance: 451
Referee: Shinichi Hirano (Japan)

17 May 2007
19:00

Japan	9–6	Thailand
Higa 9', 19'; Kogure 15', 29', 36', 37', 39'; Ono 15'; Suzumura 27'	Report	Janta 3', 12'; Saisorn 36', 38', 40'; Nueangkord 36'

Municipal Central Gymnasium, Osaka
Attendance: 1,000
Referee: Mohammad Al-Haddad (Kuwait)

17 May 2007
19:00

Kyrgyzstan	3–2 (a.e.t.)	Lebanon
Pestryakov 23', 24'; Abdyraimov 43'	Report	Atwi 26'; Takaji 34'

Commemoration Park Gymnasium, Amagasaki
Attendance: 401
Referee: Li Zhizhong (China)

=== Semi-finals ===
18 May 2007
17:00

Uzbekistan	3–7	Iran
Buriev 2'; Tajibaev 10'; Zakirov 34'	Report	Taheri 4', 5'; Asghari 10'; Pariazar 17', 28'; Keshavarz 24'; Shamsaei 39'

Municipal Central Gymnasium, Osaka
Attendance: 600
Referee: Abdulrahman Abdulqader (Bahrain)

18 May 2007
19:00

Japan	1–0	Kyrgyzstan
Suzumura 12'	Report

Municipal Central Gymnasium, Osaka
Attendance: 1,486
Referee: Ali Sabah (Iraq)

=== Third place play-off ===
19 May 2007
17:00

Uzbekistan	5–3	Kyrgyzstan
Mamedov 11'; Buriev 15', 16', 40'; Odushev 28'	Report	Pestryakov 27', 29'; Djetybaev 35'

Municipal Central Gymnasium, Osaka
Attendance: 3,051
Referee: Kazuya Isokawa (Japan)

=== Final ===
19 May 2007
19:00

Iran	4–1	Japan
Latifi 15'; Taheri 26'; Shamsaei 31'; Mohammadi 37'	Report	Higa 37'

Municipal Central Gymnasium, Osaka
Attendance: 5,289
Referee: Badrul Hisham Kalam (Malaysia)

== Awards ==
AFC Futsal Championship 2007 winners

Iran
8th title

Asghar Ghahremani, Babak Masoumi, Mohammad Taheri, Mohammad Keshavarz, Mohammad Hashemzadeh, Javad Asghari Moghaddam, Ahmad Pariazar, Kazem Mohammadi, Vahid Shamsaei, Mohammad Reza Heidarian, Mostafa Nazari, Mohammad Reza Zahmatkesh, Mansour Molaei, Majid Latifi
Coach: (Iran) Hossein Shams

- Most Valuable Player
  - (Iran) Vahid Shamsaei
- Top Scorer
  - (Japan) Kenichiro Kogure (12 goals)
- Fair-Play Award
  - Iran
- All-Star Team
  - (Iran) Mostafa Nazari (GK)
  - (Iran) Mohammad Reza Heidarian
  - (Iran) Vahid Shamsaei
  - (Japan) Kenichiro Kogure
  - (Iran) Kazem Mohammadi
  - Coach: Hossein Shams (Iran)

== Goalscorers ==
12 goals

- (Japan) Kenichiro Kogure

11 goals

- (Iran) Vahid Shamsaei
- (Uzbekistan) Abdulla Buriev

8 goals

- (Iran) Mohammad Hashemzadeh

7 goals

- (Iran) Mohammad Taheri

6 goals

- (Japan) Takuya Suzumura
- (Lebanon) Khaled Takaji
- (Thailand) Panuwat Janta

5 goals

- (Iran) Majid Latifi
- (Iran) Ahmad Pariazar
- (Lebanon) Hayssam Atwi

4 goals

- (Iran) Javad Asghari Moghaddam
- (Iran) Kazem Mohammadi
- (Japan) Ricardo Higa
- (Japan) Yuki Kanayama
- (Japan) Yusuke Komiyama
- (Japan) Daisuke Ono
- (Kyrgyzstan) Daniar Abdyraimov
- (Kyrgyzstan) Nurjan Djetybaev
- (Kyrgyzstan) Andrey Pestryakov
- (Tajikistan) Sherzod Jumaev
- (Thailand) Ekkapan Suratsawang

3 goals

- (Iraq) Hashim Khalid
- (Japan) Kenta Fujii
- (South Korea) Back Hyung-do
- (Kyrgyzstan) Jenish Mamatov
- (Lebanon) Rabih Abou-Chaaya
- (Thailand) Panomkorn Saisorn
- (Thailand) Ekkapong Suratsawang

2 goals

- (Australia) Matthew Whyte
- (Australia) Lachlan Wright
- (Hong Kong) Kwok Yue Hung
- (Hong Kong) So Sheung Kwai
- (Iran) Babak Masoumi
- (Iran) Mohammad Reza Zahmatkesh
- (Iraq) Hussein Abd-Ali
- (Iraq) Abdul-Karim Ghazi
- (Japan) Goshi Koyama
- (Kuwait) Hamed Al-Otaibi
- (Kuwait) Hamad Al-Othman
- (Kyrgyzstan) Marat Duvanaev
- (Lebanon) Mahmoud Itani
- (Malaysia) Fadzil Karnim
- (Philippines) Peyman Nejadsafavi
- (Philippines) Ariel Zerrudo
- (South Korea) Lee Jong-yun
- (Tajikistan) Firdavs Faizullaev
- (Tajikistan) Rustam Khojaev
- (Tajikistan) Alisher Ulmasov
- (Thailand) Sermphan Khumthinkaew
- (Thailand) Anucha Munjarern
- (Uzbekistan) Nikolay Odushev
- (Uzbekistan) Hurshid Tajibaev
- (Uzbekistan) Farruh Zakirov

1 goal

- (Australia) Luke Haydon
- (Australia) Adrian Vizzari
- (China) Hu Jie
- (China) Li Xin
- (China) Zhang Jiong
- (China) Zhang Xiao
- (Hong Kong) Chu Kwok Leung
- (Hong Kong) Lo Kwan Yee
- (Hong Kong) So Loi Keung
- (Iran) Mohammad Reza Heidarian
- (Iran) Mohammad Keshavarz
- (Iraq) Mohammed Abbas
- (Iraq) Waleed Khalil
- (Japan) Takeshi Kishimoto
- (Japan) Wataru Kitahara
- (Kuwait) Mohammed Al-Nagi
- (Kyrgyzstan) Vadim Cherevin
- (Kyrgyzstan) Azamat Mendibaev
- (Kyrgyzstan) Ulan Ryskulov
- (Lebanon) Mohammad Iskandarani
- (Lebanon) Francois Kharma
- (Lebanon) Serge Said
- (Malaysia) Feroz Karnim
- (South Korea) Choi Yong-sun
- (South Korea) Jeun Jun-young
- (South Korea) Kim In-woo
- (Tajikistan) Uvaydo Davlatbekov
- (Thailand) Prasert Innui
- (Thailand) Lertchai Issarasuwipakorn
- (Thailand) Joe Nueangkord
- (Turkmenistan) Guvanch Kanayev
- (Turkmenistan) Mergen Orazov
- (Turkmenistan) Agajan Resulov
- (Turkmenistan) Elman Tagayev
- (Uzbekistan) Anvar Mamedov
- (Uzbekistan) Ilhom Yusupdjanov

Own goals

- (Kyrgyzstan) Jenish Mamatov (for South Korea)
