= 2008 AFC Futsal Championship =

ฟุตซอลชิงแชมป์เอเชีย 2008

Tournament details
- Host country: Thailand
- Dates: 11–18 May
- Teams: 16 (from 1 confederation)
- Venue: 2 (in 1 host city)

Final positions
- Champions: Iran (9th title)
- Runners-up: Thailand
- Third place: Japan
- Fourth place: China

Tournament statistics
- Matches played: 32
- Goals scored: 240 (7.5 per match)
- Attendance: 42,820 (1,338 per match)
- Top scorer: (Iran) Vahid Shamsaei (13 goals)
- Best player: (Iran) Vahid Shamsaei

The 2008 AFC Futsal Championship was held in Bangkok, Thailand from 11 to 18 May 2008. The tournament acted as a qualifying tournament for the 2008 FIFA Futsal World Cup in Brazil.

== Venues ==
Bangkok
Hua Mark Indoor Stadium	Nimibutr Indoor Stadium
Capacity: 6,000	Capacity: 5,600

== Draw ==
The draw for the 2008 AFC Futsal Championship was held on 11 April 2008 in Bangkok, Thailand.

Pot 1	Pot 2	Pot 3	Pot 4
Iran; Japan; Kyrgyzstan; Uzbekistan	Australia; Lebanon; Tajikistan; Thailand	China; Iraq; South Korea; Turkmenistan	Chinese Taipei; Indonesia; Kuwait; Malaysia

== Group stage ==
=== Group A ===
Team	Pld	W	D	L	GF	GA	GD	Pts
Thailand	3	3	0	0	15	1	+14	9
Kyrgyzstan	3	2	0	1	14	4	+10	6
Indonesia	3	1	0	2	6	20	−14	3
Iraq	3	0	0	3	4	14	−10	0

11 May 2008
12:00

Kyrgyzstan	5–1	Indonesia
Abdyraimov 6'; Djetybaev 18', 22'; Mendibaev 26'; Duvanaev 38'	Report	Wiyantoro 37'

Nimibutr Indoor Stadium, Bangkok
Attendance: 2,000
Referee: Alireza Sohrabi (Iran)

11 May 2008
16:30

Thailand	1–0	Iraq
Janta 12'	Report

Nimibutr Indoor Stadium, Bangkok
Attendance: 4,700
Referee: Badrul Hisham Kalam (Malaysia)

12 May 2008
14:15

Indonesia	0–11	Thailand
	Report	Munjarern 5', 16', 35', 36'; Ihsan 12' (o.g.); Suttiroj 19'; Khumthinkaew 30'; Janta 33'; Santanaprasit 38', 39'; Tangtung 40'

Nimibutr Indoor Stadium, Bangkok
Attendance: 1,500
Referee: Karim Sistani (Iran)

12 May 2008
18:45

Iraq	0–8	Kyrgyzstan
	Report	Djetybaev 18', 27'; Malinin 23'; Sundeev 32'; Djumataev 34', 35'; Kadyrov 38'; Saad 39' (o.g.)

Nimibutr Indoor Stadium, Bangkok
Attendance: 200
Referee: Scott Kidson (Australia)

13 May 2008
16:30

Kyrgyzstan	1–3	Thailand
Kanetov 31'	Report	Munjarern 16'; Ekkapan Suratsawang 31'; Santanaprasit 38'

Nimibutr Indoor Stadium, Bangkok
Attendance: 3,000
Referee: Badrul Hisham Kalam (Malaysia)

13 May 2008
16:30

Iraq	4–5	Indonesia
Saad 15'; Ghazi 19', 23'; Khalid 24'	Report	Assegaff 3'; Handoyo 20'; Ladjanibi 29', 36'; Karmadi 39'

Hua Mark Indoor Stadium, Bangkok
Attendance: 100
Referee: Shinichi Hirano (Japan)

=== Group B ===
Team	Pld	W	D	L	GF	GA	GD	Pts
Japan	3	3	0	0	16	5	+11	9
Australia	3	2	0	1	11	5	+6	6
Turkmenistan	3	1	0	2	8	9	−1	3
Chinese Taipei	3	0	0	3	4	20	−16	0

11 May 2008
14:15

Japan	8–2	Chinese Taipei
Ono 4'; Kanayama 13', 31'; Lee Meng-chian 15' (o.g.); Komiyama 19'; Inaba 26'; Kogure 32', 37'	Report	Chang Fu-hsiang 11', 33'

Nimibutr Indoor Stadium, Bangkok
Attendance: 3,000
Referee: Nurdin Bukuev (Kyrgyzstan)

11 May 2008
18:45

Australia	3–1	Turkmenistan
Giovenali 17'; Zeballos 31'; Vizzari 40'	Report	Allaberdiyev 7'

Nimibutr Indoor Stadium, Bangkok
Attendance: 2,000
Referee: Kim Jang-kwan (South Korea)

12 May 2008
12:00

Chinese Taipei	0–6	Australia
	Report	Fang Ching-jen 13' (o.g.); Wright 14', 23', 35'; Vizzari 34'; Zeballos 40'

Nimibutr Indoor Stadium, Bangkok
Attendance: 750
Referee: Li Zhizhong (China)

12 May 2008
16:30

Turkmenistan	1–4	Japan
Muhamedmuradov 37'	Report	Fujii 1'; Inada 10'; Kanayama 13'; Kishimoto 27'

Nimibutr Indoor Stadium, Bangkok
Attendance: 400
Referee: Ali Sabah (Iraq)

13 May 2008
20:00

Japan	4–2	Australia
Kanayama 25'; Ono 28'; Inada 32'; Komiyama 40'	Report	Zeballos 13'; Haydon 16'

Nimibutr Indoor Stadium, Bangkok
Attendance: 1,300
Referee: Li Zhizhong (China)

13 May 2008
19:00

Turkmenistan	6–2	Chinese Taipei
Resulov 7', 34'; Esenmamedov 29'; Orazov 32'; Muhamedmuradov 39'; Tashliyev 39'	Report	Huang Shih-chan 30'; Chen Chun-chieh 35'

Hua Mark Indoor Stadium, Bangkok
Attendance: 50
Referee: Prasert Krutsri (Thailand)

=== Group C ===
Team	Pld	W	D	L	GF	GA	GD	Pts
Uzbekistan	3	3	0	0	19	4	+15	9
Lebanon	3	1	1	1	12	14	−2	4
Malaysia	3	1	0	2	8	19	−11	3
South Korea	3	0	1	2	11	13	−2	1

11 May 2008
12:00

Uzbekistan	10–0	Malaysia
Tajibaev 12', 15', 22', 32'; Odushev 18'; Holmatov 28'; Farhutdinov 29'; Yusupdjanov 34', 40'; Tojiboev 35'	Report

Hua Mark Indoor Stadium, Bangkok
Attendance: 300
Referee: Mohammad Al-Haddad (Kuwait)

11 May 2008
16:30

Lebanon	5–5	South Korea
Said 18'; Takaji 27', 39'; Itani 39'; Atwi 39'	Report	Jung Hae-hyuck 5'; Shin Han-kook 16'; Kang Hyun-uk 24'; Abou-Chaaya 26' (o.g.); Kim In-woo 39'

Hua Mark Indoor Stadium, Bangkok
Attendance: 300
Referee: Li Zhizhong (China)

12 May 2008
14:15

Malaysia	4–6	Lebanon
Abdul Aziz 4'; Sarmin 9'; Haris 25'; Zulkhapri 29'	Report	Atwi 5', 8' (pen.); Takaji 21', 26'; Said 26'; Abou-Chaaya 32'

Hua Mark Indoor Stadium, Bangkok
Attendance: 150
Referee: Shinichi Hirano (Japan)

12 May 2008
18:45

South Korea	3–4	Uzbekistan
Lee Jong-yun 17'; Shin Han-kook 18'; Jung Hyuk 18'	Report	Farhutdinov 5', 22'; Odushev 12', 36'

Hua Mark Indoor Stadium, Bangkok
Attendance: 150
Referee: Rey Ritaga (Philippines)

13 May 2008
12:00

Uzbekistan	5–1	Lebanon
Mamdjonov 9'; Farhutdinov 25'; Irsaliev 27', 33'; Yusupdjanov 37'	Report	Itani 9'

Nimibutr Indoor Stadium, Bangkok
Attendance: 220
Referee: Mohammad Al-Haddad (Kuwait)

13 May 2008
12:00

South Korea	3–4	Malaysia
Zulkhapri 6' (o.g.); Kang Hyun-uk 22'; Lee Jong-yun 36'	Report	Haris 8'; Mohamad 14', 37'; Zainal 22'

Hua Mark Indoor Stadium, Bangkok
Attendance: 100
Referee: Christopher Colley (Australia)

=== Group D ===
Team	Pld	W	D	L	GF	GA	GD	Pts
Iran	3	3	0	0	34	1	+33	9
China	3	2	0	1	19	8	+11	6
Tajikistan	3	1	0	2	6	27	−21	3
Kuwait	3	0	0	3	4	27	−23	0

11 May 2008
14:15

Iran	12–0	Kuwait
Taheri 10', 27'; Heidarian 10'; Raeisi 15', 39'; Shamsaei 16', 37'; Hassanzadeh 19', 36'; Asghari 22'; Hashemzadeh 23'; Keshavarz 35'	Report

Hua Mark Indoor Stadium, Bangkok
Attendance: 400
Referee: Kazuya Isokawa (Japan)

11 May 2008
21:20

Tajikistan	0–9	China
	Report	Liang Shuang 1'; Hu Jie 2'; Li Xin 6', 33'; Wang Wei 8'; Zhang Xiao 13'; Wu Zhuoxi 15' (pen.); Zhang Jiong 29'; Zhang Xi 38'

Nimibutr Indoor Stadium, Bangkok
Attendance: 50
Referee: Christopher Colley (Australia)

12 May 2008
12:00

Kuwait	4–6	Tajikistan
Al-Otaibi 17'; Al-Nagi 20'; Al-Nakkas 35'; Al-Othman 39'	Report	Faizullaev 5', 18'; Ismoilov 10'; Ulmasov 13', 29'; Jumaev 37'

Hua Mark Indoor Stadium, Bangkok
Attendance: 100
Referee: Sayfiddin Amanov (Uzbekistan)

12 May 2008
16:30

China	1–8	Iran
Liang Shuang 38'	Report	Taheri 3'; Shamsaei 9', 29'; Hassanzadeh 26', 35'; Heidarian 26'; Latifi 31'; Mohammadi 38'

Hua Mark Indoor Stadium, Bangkok
Attendance: 300
Referee: Prasert Krutsri (Thailand)

13 May 2008
14:15

Iran	14–0	Tajikistan
Hassanzadeh 5'; Sufiev 7' (o.g.); Shamsaei 9', 13', 14', 40', 40'; Tayyebi 9', 13'; Latifi 13', 18'; Ismoilov 15' (o.g.); Asghari 36'; Heidarian 36'	Report

Nimibutr Indoor Stadium, Bangkok
Attendance: 600
Referee: Ali Sabah (Iraq)

13 May 2008
14:15

China	9–0	Kuwait
Liu Xinyi 2'; Wang Wei 8', 11', 31'; Zhang Xiao 12', 22'; Li Xin 19'; Zhang Xi 36'; Wu Zhuoxi 37'	Report

Hua Mark Indoor Stadium, Bangkok
Attendance: 100
Referee: Abdulrahman Abdulqader (Bahrain)

== Knockout stage ==
Quarter-finals
May 15 – Bangkok
Thailand	5
Australia	2
May 15 – Bangkok
Uzbekistan	1
China	4
May 15 – Bangkok
Japan	4
Kyrgyzstan	0
May 15 – Bangkok
Iran	9
Lebanon	1

Semi-finals
May 16 – Bangkok
Thailand	7
China	3
May 16 – Bangkok
Japan	0
Iran	1

Final
May 18 – Bangkok
Thailand	0
Iran	4
Third place
May 18 – Bangkok
China	3
Japan	5

=== Quarter-finals ===
15 May 2008
15:00

Thailand	5–2	Australia
Ekkapong Suratsawang 7', 8'; Saisorn 17', 39'; Janta 35'	Report	Fernando 15', 28'

Nimibutr Indoor Stadium, Bangkok
Attendance: 3,500
Referee: Nurdin Bukuev (Kyrgyzstan)

15 May 2008
15:00

Uzbekistan	1–4	China
Tajibaev 38'	Report	Liu Xinyi 19'; Wu Zhuoxi 33'; Liang Shuang 39'; Li Xin 39'

Hua Mark Indoor Stadium, Bangkok
Attendance: 150
Referee: Kazuya Isokawa (Japan)

15 May 2008
17:30

Japan	4–0	Kyrgyzstan
Ono 17'; Duvanaev 19' (o.g.); Inada 34'; Kanayama 37'	Report

Nimibutr Indoor Stadium, Bangkok
Attendance: 2,200
Referee: Badrul Hisham Kalam (Malaysia)

15 May 2008
17:30

Iran	9–1	Lebanon
Taheri 3', 30'; Hashemzadeh 9'; Mohammadi 10'; Shamsaei 12'; Hassanzadeh 23'; Latifi 35'; Tayyebi 36'; Raeisi 38'	Report	Fadlallah 37'

Hua Mark Indoor Stadium, Bangkok
Attendance: 200
Referee: Kim Jang-kwan (South Korea)

=== Semi-finals ===
16 May 2008
15:00

Thailand	7–3	China
Saisorn 5', 14'; Innui 10', 25'; Munjarern 18'; Janta 20'; Santanaprasit 26'	Report	Liu Xinyi 18'; Li Jian 33'; Li Xin 36'

Nimibutr Indoor Stadium, Bangkok
Attendance: 2,800
Referee: Kim Jang-kwan (South Korea)

16 May 2008
17:30

Japan	0–1	Iran
	Report	Shamsaei 20'

Nimibutr Indoor Stadium, Bangkok
Attendance: 3,200
Referee: Scott Kidson (Australia)

=== Third place play-off ===
18 May 2008
14:30

China	3–5	Japan
Zhang Xi 25'; Liu Xinyi 33'; Liang Shuang 36'	Report	Ono 7'; Inada 22'; Kogure 35'; Komiyama 40', 40'

Nimibutr Indoor Stadium, Bangkok
Attendance: 3,000
Referee: Nurdin Bukuev (Kyrgyzstan)

=== Final ===
18 May 2008
17:00

Thailand	0–4	Iran
	Report	Latifi 8'; Shamsaei 16', 23'; Heidarian 37'

Nimibutr Indoor Stadium, Bangkok
Attendance: 6,000
Referee: Li Zhizhong (China)

== Awards ==
AFC Futsal Championship 2008 winners

Iran
9th title

Asghar Ghahremani, Mohammad Taheri, Mohammad Keshavarz, Mohammad Hashemzadeh, Javad Asghari Moghaddam, Kazem Mohammadi, Vahid Shamsaei, Mohammad Reza Heidarian, Majid Latifi, Mostafa Nazari, Majid Raeisi, Mostafa Tayyebi, Ali Asghar Hassanzadeh, Hamid Reza Abrarinia
Coach: (Iran) Hossein Shams

- Most Valuable Player
  - (Iran) Vahid Shamsaei
- Top Scorer
  - (Iran) Vahid Shamsaei (13 goals)
- Fair-Play Award
  - Japan
- All-Star Team
  - (Iran) Mostafa Nazari (GK)
  - (Iran) Mohammad Taheri
  - (Japan) Daisuke Ono
  - (Thailand) Panuwat Janta
  - (Iran) Vahid Shamsaei
  - Coach: Hossein Shams (Iran)
- Reserve All-Star Team
  - (China) Zheng Tao and (Thailand) Somkid Chuenta (GK)
  - (Iran) Mohammad Reza Heidarian
  - (Iran) Mohammad Keshavarz
  - (Thailand) Lertchai Issarasuwipakorn
  - (Iran) Majid Latifi
  - Coach: (Brazil) Farinha (China) and (Spain) Jose María Pazos (Thailand)

== Goalscorers ==
13 goals

- (Iran) Vahid Shamsaei

6 goals

- (Iran) Ali Asghar Hassanzadeh
- (Thailand) Anucha Munjarern

5 goals

- (China) Li Xin
- (Iran) Majid Latifi
- (Iran) Mohammad Taheri
- (Japan) Yuki Kanayama
- (Uzbekistan) Hurshid Tajibaev

4 goals

- (China) Liang Shuang
- (China) Liu Xinyi
- (China) Wang Wei
- (Iran) Mohammad Reza Heidarian
- (Japan) Yusuke Inada
- (Japan) Yusuke Komiyama
- (Japan) Daisuke Ono
- (Kyrgyzstan) Nurjan Djetybaev
- (Lebanon) Khaled Takaji
- (Thailand) Panuwat Janta
- (Thailand) Panomkorn Saisorn
- (Thailand) Tanakorn Santanaprasit
- (Uzbekistan) Farruh Farhutdinov

3 goals

- (Australia) Lachlan Wright
- (Australia) Christopher Zeballos
- (China) Wu Zhuoxi
- (China) Zhang Xi
- (China) Zhang Xiao
- (Iran) Majid Raeisi
- (Iran) Mostafa Tayyebi
- (Japan) Kenichiro Kogure
- (Lebanon) Hayssam Atwi
- (Uzbekistan) Nikolay Odushev
- (Uzbekistan) Ilhom Yusupdjanov

2 goals

- (Australia) Fernando
- (Australia) Adrian Vizzari
- (Chinese Taipei) Chang Fu-hsiang
- (Indonesia) Jaelani Ladjanibi
- (Iran) Javad Asghari Moghaddam
- (Iran) Mohammad Hashemzadeh
- (Iran) Kazem Mohammadi
- (Iraq) Abdul-Karim Ghazi
- (Kyrgyzstan) Talaibek Djumataev
- (Lebanon) Mahmoud Itani
- (Lebanon) Serge Said
- (Malaysia) Muizzudin Mohd Haris
- (Malaysia) Safar Mohamad
- (South Korea) Kang Hyun-uk
- (South Korea) Lee Jong-yun
- (South Korea) Shin Han-kook
- (Tajikistan) Firdavs Faizullaev
- (Tajikistan) Alisher Ulmasov
- (Thailand) Prasert Innui
- (Thailand) Ekkapong Suratsawang
- (Turkmenistan) Mekan Muhamedmuradov
- (Turkmenistan) Agajan Resulov
- (Uzbekistan) Dilshod Irsaliev

1 goal

- (Australia) Greg Giovenali
- (Australia) Luke Haydon
- (China) Hu Jie
- (China) Li Jian
- (China) Zhang Jiong
- (Chinese Taipei) Chen Chun-chieh
- (Chinese Taipei) Huang Shih-chan
- (Indonesia) Fachry Assegaff
- (Indonesia) Deny Handoyo
- (Indonesia) Sayan Karmadi
- (Indonesia) Topas Wiyantoro
- (Iran) Mohammad Keshavarz
- (Iraq) Hashim Khalid
- (Iraq) Ali Saad
- (Japan) Kenta Fujii
- (Japan) Kotaro Inaba
- (Japan) Takeshi Kishimoto
- (Kuwait) Meshari Al-Nakkas
- (Kuwait) Mohammad Al-Nagi
- (Kuwait) Hamed Al-Otaibi
- (Kuwait) Hamad Al-Othman
- (Kyrgyzstan) Daniar Abdyraimov
- (Kyrgyzstan) Marat Duvanaev
- (Kyrgyzstan) Dilshat Kadyrov
- (Kyrgyzstan) Emil Kanetov
- (Kyrgyzstan) Evgeniy Malinin
- (Kyrgyzstan) Azamat Mendibaev
- (Kyrgyzstan) Mihail Sundeev
- (Lebanon) Rabih Abou-Chaaya
- (Lebanon) Abbas Fadlallah
- (Malaysia) Ruzaley Abdul Aziz
- (Malaysia) Ahmad Hanif Sarmin
- (Malaysia) Addie Azwan Zainal
- (Malaysia) Zaidi Zulkhapri
- (South Korea) Jung Hae-hyuck
- (South Korea) Jung Hyuk
- (South Korea) Kim In-woo
- (Tajikistan) Obidjon Ismoilov
- (Tajikistan) Sherzod Jumaev
- (Thailand) Sermphan Khumthinkaew
- (Thailand) Ekkapan Suratsawang
- (Thailand) Natthapon Suttiroj
- (Thailand) Ukrit Tangtung
- (Turkmenistan) Ahmed Allaberdiyev
- (Turkmenistan) Bayrammurat Esenmamedov
- (Turkmenistan) Mergen Orazov
- (Turkmenistan) Ildar Tashliyev
- (Uzbekistan) Umid Holmatov
- (Uzbekistan) Gulomjon Mamdjonov
- (Uzbekistan) Shuhrat Tojiboev

Own goals

- (Chinese Taipei) Fang Ching-jen (for Australia)
- (Chinese Taipei) Lee Meng-chian (for Japan)
- (Indonesia) Maulana Ihsan (for Thailand)
- (Iraq) Ali Saad (for Kyrgyzstan)
- (Kyrgyzstan) Marat Duvanaev (for Japan)
- (Lebanon) Rabih Abou-Chaaya (for South Korea)
- (Malaysia) Zaidi Zulkhapri (for South Korea)
- (Tajikistan) Obidjon Ismoilov (for Iran)
- (Tajikistan) Bakhodur Sufiev (for Iran)
