= 2006 AFC Futsal Championship =

Futzal Bo'yicha 2006 Yilgi Osiyo Chempionati

Tournament details
- Host country: Uzbekistan
- Dates: 21–27 May
- Teams: 16 (from 1 confederation)
- Venue: 1 (in 1 host city)

Final positions
- Champions: Japan (1st title)
- Runners-up: Uzbekistan
- Third place: Iran
- Fourth place: Kyrgyzstan

Tournament statistics
- Matches played: 28
- Goals scored: 249 (8.89 per match)
- Top scorer: (Iran) Vahid Shamsaei (16 goals)
- Best player: (Japan) Kenichiro Kogure

The 2006 AFC Futsal Championship was held in Tashkent, Uzbekistan from 21 to 27 May 2006.

== Venue ==
Tashkent
Yunusabad Sports Complex
Capacity: Unknown

== Draw ==
The draw for the 2006 AFC Futsal Championship was held on 27 April 2006 in Tashkent, Uzbekistan.

Pot 1	Pot 2	Pot 3	Pot 4
Iran; Japan; Kyrgyzstan; Uzbekistan	China; Kuwait; Tajikistan; Thailand	Chinese Taipei; Indonesia; Iraq; Lebanon	Australia; Hong Kong; Malaysia; Turkmenistan

== Group stage ==
=== Group A ===
Team	Pld	W	D	L	GF	GA	GD	Pts
Uzbekistan	3	3	0	0	17	1	+16	9
China	3	2	0	1	10	8	+2	6
Malaysia	3	1	0	2	6	15	−9	3
Chinese Taipei	3	0	0	3	7	16	−9	0

22 May 2006
12:00

Uzbekistan	7–0	Malaysia
Buriev 2'; Tajibaev 5', 17', 27', 28'; Mamedov 8'; Odushev 33'

Yunusabad Sports Complex, Tashkent

22 May 2006
13:30

China	5–3	Chinese Taipei
Zhang Xi 19'; Li Xin 25'; Yang Qihua 27', 40'; Zhang Jiong 39'		Wang Chih-sheng 5'; Tseng Tai-lin 39', 40'

Yunusabad Sports Complex, Tashkent

23 May 2006
16:30

Chinese Taipei	0–6	Uzbekistan
		Tajibaevev 12'; Mamedov 14'; Yusupdjanov 14'; Holmatov 17'; Buriev 35'; Farhutdinov 39'

Yunusabad Sports Complex, Tashkent

23 May 2006
15:00

Malaysia	1–4	China
Zainal 23'		Yang Qihua 9'; Wu Zhuoxi 15', 20'; Li Xin 16'

Yunusabad Sports Complex, Tashkent

24 May 2006
18:00

Uzbekistan	4–1	China
Holmatov 4'; Buriev 33', 39'; Odushev 39'		Li Xin 32'

Yunusabad Sports Complex, Tashkent

24 May 2006
19:30

Malaysia	5–4	Chinese Taipei

Yunusabad Sports Complex, Tashkent

=== Group B ===
Team	Pld	W	D	L	GF	GA	GD	Pts
Japan	3	3	0	0	25	6	+19	9
Tajikistan	3	2	0	1	16	18	−2	6
Hong Kong	3	1	0	2	11	20	−9	3
Iraq	3	0	0	3	4	12	−8	0

21 May 2006
16:30

Tajikistan	4–2	Iraq
Kamaletdinov 9'; Jumaev 11'; Vasiev 12'; Makhmudov 27'		Khalaf 8'; Shamil 19'

Yunusabad Sports Complex, Tashkent

21 May 2006
15:00

Japan	12–0	Hong Kong
Fujii 2'; Higa 18'; Kogure 18', 26', 40'; Toyoshima 20'; Suzumura 24', 28'; Koyama 29', 31', 38'; Takahashi 36'

Yunusabad Sports Complex, Tashkent

22 May 2006
19:30

Iraq	0–2	Japan
		Kogure 8', 18'

Yunusabad Sports Complex, Tashkent

22 May 2006
18:00

Hong Kong	5–6	Tajikistan
Leung Chi Kui 4', 35', 39'; Li Hang Wui 8', 28'		Makhmudov 9', 9', 32', 33', 40'

Yunusabad Sports Complex, Tashkent

24 May 2006
12:00

Japan	11–6	Tajikistan
Suzumura 11', 35'; Komiyama 13'; Kogure 13', 15', 19', 26', 28', 39'; Maeda 18'; Ono 35'		Irgashev 4', 16'; Makhmudov 9', 35', 37', 40'

Yunusabad Sports Complex, Tashkent

24 May 2006
13:30

Hong Kong	6–2	Iraq
Lo Kwan Yee 14'; Liu Quankun 14', 36'; Cheung Kin Fung 24'; Li Hang Wui 27'; Leung Chi Kui 38'		Goal

Yunusabad Sports Complex, Tashkent

=== Group C ===
Team	Pld	W	D	L	GF	GA	GD	Pts
Kyrgyzstan	3	3	0	0	14	4	+10	9
Australia	3	2	0	1	14	13	+1	6
Kuwait	3	0	1	2	9	14	−5	1
Lebanon	3	0	1	2	12	18	−6	1

21 May 2006
18:00

Kyrgyzstan	5–1	Australia
Duvanaev 5'; Mamatov 12', 13'; Abdyraimov 15'; Cherevin 35'		Tolubai Uulu 40' (o.g.)

Yunusabad Sports Complex, Tashkent

21 May 2006
19:30

Kuwait	5–5	Lebanon
Al-Othman 5', 37'; Al-Asfour 8', 19', 23'		Atwi 23'; Takaji 24', 26'; Itani 27', 31'

Yunusabad Sports Complex, Tashkent

23 May 2006
12:00

Australia	7–4	Kuwait
Wright 5'; Nolan 15', 35', 39'; Haydon 19'; Zeballos 25', 37'		Humoud 12', 37'; Al-Ajmi 34', 36'

Yunusabad Sports Complex, Tashkent

23 May 2006
13:30

Lebanon	3–7	Kyrgyzstan
Itani 9'; Atwi 26'; Takaji 33'		Abdyraimov 18'; Pestryakov 18', 27', 38'; Sundeev 25', 27'; Duvanaev 39'

Yunusabad Sports Complex, Tashkent

24 May 2006
15:00

Kyrgyzstan	2–0	Kuwait
Mamatov 17'; Pestryakov 19'

Yunusabad Sports Complex, Tashkent

24 May 2006
16:30

Australia	6–4	Lebanon
Wright 5'; Downie 9'; Manson 13', 40'; Haydon 16'; Zeballos 30'		Fadlallah 10'; Atwi 18'; Daher 32'; Takaji 38'

Yunusabad Sports Complex, Tashkent

=== Group D ===
Team	Pld	W	D	L	GF	GA	GD	Pts
Iran	3	3	0	0	40	4	+36	9
Thailand	3	2	0	1	19	11	+8	6
Turkmenistan	3	1	0	2	11	25	−14	3
Indonesia	3	0	0	3	8	38	−30	0

21 May 2006
12:00

Iran	14–0	Turkmenistan
Hashemzadeh 5', 22', 38'; Shamsaei 6', 16', 24', 33', 34'; Raeisi 13'; Mohammadi 14', 19'; Hassanzadeh 32'; Latifi 36', 37'

Yunusabad Sports Complex, Tashkent

21 May 2006
13:30

Thailand	8–4	Indonesia
Piemkum 1', 3', 13', 39'; Nueangkord 5', 17'; Innui 6'; Khumthinkaew 23'		Irawan 5'; Handoyo 19'; Karmadi 27'; Ladjanibi 35'

Yunusabad Sports Complex, Tashkent

22 May 2006
15:00

Turkmenistan	1–8	Thailand
Goal		Nueangkord 4', 22', 31'; Innui 8'; Ekkapong Suratsawang 10', 11'; Janta 14'; Khumthinkaew 32'

Yunusabad Sports Complex, Tashkent

22 May 2006
16:30

Indonesia	1–20	Iran
Goal		Mohammadi 4', 21', 25'; Latifi 11'; Shamsaei 17', 18', 23', 25', 32', 33', 40'; Zareei 17', 19', 24', 36'; Hashemzadeh 20'; Raeisi 26', 29'; Tikdarinejad 27'; Daneshvar 40'

Yunusabad Sports Complex, Tashkent

23 May 2006
18:00

Iran	6–4	Thailand
Shamsaei 2', 20', 30'; Nazari 24'; Raeisi 27'; Zareei 34'		Janta 1'; Innui 18', 40'; Khumthinkaew 33'

Yunusabad Sports Complex, Tashkent

23 May 2006
19:30

Turkmenistan	10–3	Indonesia
Resulov 14'; Gevorkyan 7', 16', 19', 30'; Sidorov 10', 21'; Abdullayev 24', 32'; Orazov 38'		Issa 23'; Safarudin 39', 39'

Yunusabad Sports Complex, Tashkent

== Knockout stage ==
Semi-finals
May 26 – Tashkent
Uzbekistan	4
Kyrgyzstan	2
May 26 – Tashkent
Japan	5
Iran	1

Final
May 27 – Tashkent
Uzbekistan	1
Japan	5
Third place
May 27 – Tashkent
Kyrgyzstan	3
Iran	5

=== Semi-finals ===
26 May 2006
16:00

Uzbekistan	4–2	Kyrgyzstan
Tajibaev 5', 22'; Mamedov 27'; Buriev 34'		Duvanaev 3'; Sundeev 31'

Yunusabad Sports Complex, Tashkent

26 May 2006
18:00

Japan	5–1	Iran
Takahashi 16'; Kogure 30'; Ono 35', 39', 40'		Shamsaei 24'

Yunusabad Sports Complex, Tashkent

=== Third place play-off ===
27 May 2006
16:00

Kyrgyzstan	3–5	Iran
Hashemzadeh 34' (o.g.); Tolubai Uulu 36', 39'		Daneshvar 33', 33'; Mohammadi 35', 40'; Zareei 36'

Yunusabad Sports Complex, Tashkent

=== Final ===
27 May 2006
18:00

Uzbekistan	1–5	Japan
Mamedov 36'		Kogure 22', 36'; Suzumura 31'; Higa 32'; Ono 35'

Yunusabad Sports Complex, Tashkent
Attendance: 2,500

== Awards ==
AFC Futsal Championship 2006 winners

Japan
1st title

Ricardo Higa, Kenta Fujii, Kenichiro Kogure, Akira Toyoshima, Takuya Suzumura, Goshi Koyama, Kensuke Takahashi, Yusuke Komiyama, Yoshifumi Maeda, Daisuke Ono, Hisamitsu Kawahara
Coach: (Brazil) Sergio Sapo

- Most Valuable Player
  - (Japan) Kenichiro Kogure
- Top Scorer
  - (Iran) Vahid Shamsaei (16 goals)
- Fair-Play Award
  - Uzbekistan
