= 2010 AFC Futsal Championship =

Futzal Bo'yicha 2010 Yilgi Osiyo Chempionati

Tournament details
- Host country: Uzbekistan
- Dates: 23–30 May
- Teams: 16 (from 1 confederation)
- Venues: 2 (in 1 host city)

Final positions
- Champions: Iran (10th title)
- Runners-up: Uzbekistan
- Third place: Japan
- Fourth place: China

Tournament statistics
- Matches played: 32
- Goals scored: 260 (8.13 per match)
- Attendance: 22,600 (706 per match)
- Top scorer: (Iran) Mohammad Taheri (13 goals)
- Best player: (Iran) Mohammad Taheri

The 2010 AFC Futsal Championship was held in Tashkent, Uzbekistan from 23 to 30 May 2010.

== Venues ==
Tashkent
Uzbekistan Sports Complex	IT University Complex
Capacity: Unknown	Capacity: Unknown

== Draw ==
The draw for the 2010 AFC Futsal Championship was held on 20 March 2010 in Tashkent, Uzbekistan.

Pot 1	Pot 2	Pot 3	Pot 4
Uzbekistan; Iran; Japan; Thailand	Chinese Taipei; Kuwait; Turkmenistan; Vietnam	Australia; Indonesia; Iraq; South Korea	China; Kyrgyzstan; Lebanon; Tajikistan

== Group stage ==
=== Group A ===
Team	Pld	W	D	L	GF	GA	GD	Pts
Uzbekistan	3	3	0	0	11	4	+7	9
Lebanon	3	2	0	1	11	9	+2	6
Indonesia	3	1	0	2	10	9	+1	3
Chinese Taipei	3	0	0	3	6	16	−10	0

23 May 2010
12:30

Uzbekistan	3–1	Lebanon
Elibaev 7'; Tajibaev 10'; Irsaliev 40'	Report	Takaji 34'

Uzbekistan Sports Complex, Tashkent
Attendance: 1,200
Referee: Naoki Miyatani (Japan)

23 May 2010
17:30

Chinese Taipei	1–6	Indonesia
Fang Ching-jen 1'	Report	Haidar 3'; Hutabarat 6'; Matulessy 10'; Ladjanibi 19'; Handoyo 25'; Hera 34'

Uzbekistan Sports Complex, Tashkent
Attendance: 250
Referee: Kim Jang-kwan (South Korea)

24 May 2010
12:30

Lebanon	6–4	Chinese Taipei
Chaito 10', 10'; Atwi 13', 30'; Kawsan 21', 25'	Report	Wang Chih-sheng 11'; Fang Ching-jen 34', 35', 38'

Uzbekistan Sports Complex, Tashkent
Attendance: 150
Referee: Scott Kidson (Australia)

24 May 2010
17:30

Indonesia	2–4	Uzbekistan
Ohorella 27'; Purba 32'	Report	Irsaliev 12'; Samegov 32'; Elibaev 33'; Sviridov 36'

Uzbekistan Sports Complex, Tashkent
Attendance: 3,000
Referee: Alireza Sohrabi (Iran)

25 May 2010
12:30

Uzbekistan	4–1	Chinese Taipei
Elibaev 7'; Tajibaev 33'; Yunusov 34', 40'	Report	Lo Chih-an 21'

Uzbekistan Sports Complex, Tashkent
Attendance: 3,000
Referee: Vahid Arzpeima (Iran)

25 May 2010
12:30

Indonesia	2–4	Lebanon
Karmadi 14'; Haidar 20'	Report	Takaji 18', 30'; Kawsan 21', 22'

IT University Complex, Tashkent
Attendance: 250
Referee: Christopher Colley (Australia)

=== Group B ===
Team	Pld	W	D	L	GF	GA	GD	Pts
Iran	3	3	0	0	35	5	+30	9
Australia	3	2	0	1	12	15	−3	6
Tajikistan	3	1	0	2	10	27	−17	3
Kuwait	3	0	0	3	5	15	−10	0

23 May 2010
15:00

Iran	19–2	Tajikistan
Hassanzadeh 1', 2', 4'; Taheri 4', 12', 21', 22', 23', 28', 38'; Zahmatkesh 6', 8', 32'; Daneshvar 18', 22', 30', 37'; Raeisi 24'; Tayyebi 37'	Report	Vasiev 26'; Fatkhulloev 33'

Uzbekistan Sports Complex, Tashkent
Attendance: 150
Referee: Husein Khalaileh (Jordan)

23 May 2010
20:00

Kuwait	2–4	Australia
Al-Mekaimi 19'; Al-Jaser 34'	Report	Rogić 16', 21', 40'; Ngaluafe 17'

Uzbekistan Sports Complex, Tashkent
Attendance: 250
Referee: Mohamad Chami (Lebanon)

24 May 2010
15:00

Tajikistan	4–3	Kuwait
Ulmasov 3', 18', 38'; Makhmudov 6'	Report	Aman 23'; Mohammad 25'; Al-Jaser 39'

Uzbekistan Sports Complex, Tashkent
Attendance: 250
Referee: Prasert Krutsri (Thailand)

24 May 2010
20:00

Australia	3–9	Iran
Fogarty 9'; Giovenali 12' (pen.); Rogić 18'	Report	Zahmatkesh 4', 29'; Taheri 8', 32'; Keshavarz 14'; Tayyebi 24', 40'; Asghari 38'; Rahnama 39'

Uzbekistan Sports Complex, Tashkent
Attendance: 650
Referee: Vadim Baratov (Turkmenistan)

25 May 2010
15:00

Iran	7–0	Kuwait
Daneshvar 6'; Hashemzadeh 9'; Tayyebi 22', 31'; Zahmatkesh 36'; Taheri 39', 40'	Report

Uzbekistan Sports Complex, Tashkent
Attendance: 400
Referee: Naoki Miyatani (Japan)

25 May 2010
15:00

Australia	5–4	Tajikistan
Giovenali 14'; Miller 20', 26'; Rogić 23', 36'	Report	Makhmudov 5'; Jumaev 8', 22', 30'

IT University Complex, Tashkent
Attendance: 250
Referee: Rey Ritaga (Philippines)

=== Group C ===
Team	Pld	W	D	L	GF	GA	GD	Pts
Thailand	3	3	0	0	19	7	+12	9
Kyrgyzstan	3	1	1	1	10	10	0	4
Vietnam	3	1	0	2	11	12	−1	3
South Korea	3	0	1	2	10	21	−11	1

23 May 2010
12:30

Thailand	4–2	Kyrgyzstan
Chalarmkhet 18'; Suratsawang 21'; Thueanklang 32'; Tabaldiev 38' (o.g.)	Report	Mendibaev 3'; Kondratkov 14'

IT University Complex, Tashkent
Attendance: 500
Referee: Ryan Shepheard (Australia)

23 May 2010
17:30

Vietnam	7–3	South Korea
Nguyễn Trọng Thiện 4', 10', 23'; Nguyễn Hoàng Giang 32'; Trần Hoàng Vinh 37'; Huỳnh Bá Tuấn 38', 40'	Report	Kim Jeong-nam 3', 33'; Shin Jong-hoon 31'

IT University Complex, Tashkent
Attendance: 500
Referee: Christopher Colley (Australia)

24 May 2010
12:30

Kyrgyzstan	4–2	Vietnam
Kadyrov 15', 39'; Abdurazakov 19'; Djetybaev 24'	Report	Trần Hoàng Vinh 27', 34'

IT University Complex, Tashkent
Attendance: 500
Referee: Kazuya Isokawa (Japan)

24 May 2010
17:30

South Korea	3–10	Thailand
Jeong Eui-hyun 24'; Kim Jeong-nam 30', 37'	Report	Issarasuwipakorn 1', 1'; Thueanklang 4', 25'; Thusiri 6'; Wongkaeo 12'; Janta 16'; Chalarmkhet 30', 37', 39'

IT University Complex, Tashkent
Attendance: 400
Referee: Rey Ritaga (Philippines)

25 May 2010
17:30

Thailand	5–2	Vietnam
Thueanklang 3', 11'; Thusiri 15'; Trương Quốc Tuấn 29' (o.g.); Issarasuwipakorn 33'	Report	Nguyễn Quốc Bảo 9'; Trương Quốc Tuấn 35'

Uzbekistan Sports Complex, Tashkent
Attendance: 200
Referee: Vadim Baratov (Turkmenistan)

25 May 2010
17:30

South Korea	4–4	Kyrgyzstan
Jeong Eui-hyun 3', 33', 40'; Seok Dae-sung 29'	Report	Kadyrov 1'; Abdurazakov 12'; Mendibaev 30', 39'

IT University Complex, Tashkent
Attendance: 150
Referee: Abdulrahman Abdulqader (Bahrain)

=== Group D ===
Team	Pld	W	D	L	GF	GA	GD	Pts
Japan	3	3	0	0	16	2	+14	9
China	3	2	0	1	14	13	+1	6
Iraq	3	1	0	2	12	20	−8	3
Turkmenistan	3	0	0	3	5	12	−7	0

23 May 2010
15:00

Japan	5–1	China
Kamisawa 5', 35'; Murakami 18'; Takahashi 20'; Komiyama 27'	Report	Liang Shuang 40'

IT University Complex, Tashkent
Attendance: 500
Referee: Nurdin Bukuev (Kyrgyzstan)

23 May 2010
20:00

Turkmenistan	3–5	Iraq
Muhamedmuradov 5'; Muhammedov 33'; Esenmamedov 35'	Report	Mohsin 4', 35'; Bachay 28', 38'; Abd-Ali 40'

IT University Complex, Tashkent
Attendance: 350
Referee: Vahid Arzpeima (Iran)

24 May 2010
15:00

China	6–2	Turkmenistan
Zhang Xi 2'; Zheng Tao 3'; Zhang Xiao 4'; Huang He 15', 38'; Liang Shuang 25'	Report	Chariyev 3'; Atayev 15'

IT University Complex, Tashkent
Attendance: 250
Referee: Abdulrahman Abdulqader (Bahrain)

24 May 2010
20:00

Iraq	1–10	Japan
Majid 10'	Report	Kamisawa 2', 3'; Kogure 11'; Osodo 21', 36'; Takahashi 23', 31'; Hoshi 26'; Yoshida 27'; Matsumiya 36'

IT University Complex, Tashkent
Attendance: 150
Referee: Mohammad Al-Haddad (Kuwait)

25 May 2010
20:00

Japan	1–0	Turkmenistan
Kamisawa 11'	Report

Uzbekistan Sports Complex, Tashkent
Attendance: 400
Referee: Scott Kidson (Australia)

25 May 2010
20:00

Iraq	6–7	China
Mohsin 23', 34', 39'; Bachay 32'; Hanna 37'; Ghazi 38'	Report	Zhang Xi 3', 22', 29'; Zhang Jiong 10'; Li Xin 24'; Hu Jie 32' (pen.), 33'

IT University Complex, Tashkent
Attendance: 250
Referee: Nurdin Bukuev (Kyrgyzstan)

== Knockout stage ==
Quarter-finals
May 27 – Tashkent
Uzbekistan	5
Australia	3
May 27 – Tashkent
Thailand	2
China	9
May 27 – Tashkent
Iran	7
Lebanon	1
May 27 – Tashkent
Japan	4
Kyrgyzstan	0

Semi-finals
May 28 – Tashkent
Uzbekistan	4
China	3
May 28 – Tashkent
Iran	7
Japan	0

Final
May 30 – Tashkent
Uzbekistan	3
Iran	8
Third place
May 30 – Tashkent
China	1
Japan	6

=== Quarter-finals ===
27 May 2010
11:00

Thailand	2–9	China
Thueanklang 8'; Janta 28'	Report	Zhang Xi 2', 9', 31'; Wang Wei 9', 33'; Zhang Xiao 17'; Liang Shuang 30', 39'; Li Xin 31'

Uzbekistan Sports Complex, Tashkent
Attendance: 300
Referee: Alireza Sohrabi (Iran)

27 May 2010
14:00

Japan	4–0	Kyrgyzstan
Komiyama 8'; Matsumiya 16'; Murakami 33'; Hoshi 40'	Report

Uzbekistan Sports Complex, Tashkent
Attendance: 400
Referee: Kim Jang-kwan (South Korea)

27 May 2010
17:30

Uzbekistan	5–3	Australia
Yunusov 18', 33'; Fayzullaev 26'; Irsaliev 27'; Sviridov 36'	Report	Seeto 20'; Adeli 24'; Giovenali 35'

Uzbekistan Sports Complex, Tashkent
Attendance: 3,000
Referee: Kazuya Isokawa (Japan)

27 May 2010
20:00

Iran	7–1	Lebanon
Keshavarz 7'; Hashemzadeh 9'; Daneshvar 13', 24'; Tayyebi 14'; Zahmatkesh 27'; Taheri 34'	Report	Chaito 11'

Uzbekistan Sports Complex, Tashkent
Attendance: 550
Referee: Scott Kidson (Australia)

=== Semi-finals ===
28 May 2010
16:30

Uzbekistan	4–3	China
Yunusov 2'; Samegov 19', 33'; Elibaev 24'	Report	Li Xin 4', 8', 19'

Uzbekistan Sports Complex, Tashkent
Attendance: 2,500
Referee: Mohammad Al-Haddad (Kuwait)

28 May 2010
19:30

Iran	7–0	Japan
Daneshvar 1', 12'; Tayyebi 21'; Asghari 24', 27', 31'; Keshavarz 35'	Report

Uzbekistan Sports Complex, Tashkent
Attendance: 1,500
Referee: Ryan Shepheard (Australia)

=== Third place play-off ===
30 May 2010
15:00

China	1–6	Japan
Hu Jie 21'	Report	Takahashi 4', 15'; Murakami 16'; Osodo 24'; Matsumiya 27'; Takita 40'

Uzbekistan Sports Complex, Tashkent
Attendance: 1,500
Referee: Christopher Colley (Australia)

=== Final ===
30 May 2010
18:00

Uzbekistan	3–8	Iran
Irsaliev 2'; Elibaev 5', 22'	Report	Asghari 5'; Raeisi 12', 24'; Taheri 19'; Daneshvar 22', 31'; Hassanzadeh 25', 27'

Uzbekistan Sports Complex, Tashkent
Attendance: 3,500
Referee: Kazuya Isokawa (Japan)

== Awards ==
AFC Futsal Championship 2010 winners

Iran
10th title

Hamid Reza Abrarinia, Hossein Soltani, Mohammad Keshavarz, Mohammad Hashemzadeh, Javad Asghari Moghaddam, Ali Asghar Hassanzadeh, Majid Raeisi, Masoud Daneshvar, Mohammad Taheri, Mohammad Reza Zahmatkesh, Mostafa Nazari, Mostafa Tayyebi, Ali Rahnama, Mojtaba Nassirnia
Coach: (Iran) Hossein Shams

- Most Valuable Player
  - (Iran) Mohammad Taheri
- Top Scorer
  - (Iran) Mohammad Taheri (13 goals)
- Fair-Play Award
  - Iran

== Goalscorers ==
13 goals

- (Iran) Mohammad Taheri

11 goals

- (Iran) Masoud Daneshvar

7 goals

- (China) Zhang Xi
- (Iran) Mostafa Tayyebi
- (Iran) Mohammad Reza Zahmatkesh

6 goals

- (Australia) Tom Rogić
- (Thailand) Suphawut Thueanklang
- (Uzbekistan) Nodir Elibaev

5 goals

- (China) Li Xin
- (Iran) Javad Asghari Moghaddam
- (Iran) Ali Asghar Hassanzadeh
- (Iraq) Karrar Mohsin
- (Japan) Takanori Kamisawa
- (Japan) Kensuke Takahashi
- (Uzbekistan) Artur Yunusov

4 goals

- (China) Liang Shuang
- (Chinese Taipei) Fang Ching-jen
- (Lebanon) Kassem Kawsan
- (South Korea) Jeong Eui-hyun
- (South Korea) Kim Jeong-nam
- (Thailand) Kiatiyot Chalarmkhet
- (Uzbekistan) Dilshod Irsaliev

3 goals

- (Australia) Greg Giovenali
- (China) Hu Jie
- (Iran) Mohammad Keshavarz
- (Iran) Majid Raeisi
- (Iraq) Mustafa Bachay
- (Japan) Tetsuya Murakami
- (Japan) Mitsuyoshi Matsumiya
- (Japan) Nobuya Osodo
- (Kyrgyzstan) Dilshat Kadyrov
- (Kyrgyzstan) Azamat Mendibaev
- (Lebanon) Hassan Chaito
- (Lebanon) Khaled Takaji
- (Tajikistan) Sherzod Jumaev
- (Tajikistan) Alisher Ulmasov
- (Thailand) Lertchai Issarasuwipakorn
- (Uzbekistan) Fakhriddin Samegov
- (Vietnam) Nguyễn Trọng Thiện
- (Vietnam) Trần Hoàng Vinh

2 goals

- (China) Huang He
- (China) Wang Wei
- (China) Zhang Xiao
- (Indonesia) Ali Haidar
- (Iran) Mohammad Hashemzadeh
- (Japan) Shota Hoshi
- (Japan) Yusuke Komiyama
- (Kuwait) Omar Al-Jaser
- (Kyrgyzstan) Gulbek Abdurazakov
- (Lebanon) Hayssam Atwi
- (Tajikistan) Khurshed Makhmudov
- (Thailand) Panuwat Janta
- (Thailand) Natee Thusiri
- (Uzbekistan) Konstantin Sviridov
- (Uzbekistan) Hurshid Tajibaev
- (Vietnam) Huỳnh Bá Tuấn

1 goal

- (Australia) Shervin Adeli
- (Australia) Daniel Fogarty
- (Australia) Danny Ngaluafe
- (Australia) Tobias Seeto
- (China) Zhang Jiong
- (China) Zheng Tao
- (Chinese Taipei) Lo Chih-an
- (Chinese Taipei) Wang Chih-sheng
- (Indonesia) Deny Handoyo
- (Indonesia) Benny Hera
- (Indonesia) Vennard Hutabarat
- (Indonesia) Sayan Karmadi
- (Indonesia) Jaelani Ladjanibi
- (Indonesia) Socrates Matulessy
- (Indonesia) Hairul Saleh Ohorella
- (Indonesia) Jefri Purba
- (Iran) Ali Rahnama
- (Iraq) Hussein Abd-Ali
- (Iraq) Abdul-Karim Ghazi
- (Iraq) Admon Hanna
- (Iraq) Zaman Majid
- (Japan) Kenichiro Kogure
- (Japan) Manabu Takita
- (Japan) Akira Yoshida
- (Kuwait) Salem Al-Mekaimi
- (Kuwait) Salem Aman
- (Kuwait) Hamzah Mohammad
- (Kyrgyzstan) Nurjan Djetybaev
- (Kyrgyzstan) Vadim Kondratkov
- (South Korea) Seok Dae-sung
- (South Korea) Shin Jong-hoon
- (Tajikistan) Fatkhulo Fatkhulloev
- (Tajikistan) Dilshod Vasiev
- (Thailand) Ekkapong Suratsawang
- (Thailand) Kritsada Wongkaeo
- (Turkmenistan) Mergen Atayev
- (Turkmenistan) Annaberdy Chariyev
- (Turkmenistan) Bayrammurat Esenmamedov
- (Turkmenistan) Mekan Muhamedmuradov
- (Turkmenistan) Nuryagdy Muhammedov
- (Uzbekistan) Makhsud Fayzullaev
- (Vietnam) Nguyễn Hoàng Giang
- (Vietnam) Nguyễn Quốc Bảo
- (Vietnam) Trương Quốc Tuấn

Own goals

- (Kyrgyzstan) Erkin Tabaldiev (for Thailand)
- (Vietnam) Trương Quốc Tuấn (for Thailand)
