= Suzumura =

Suzumura is a Japanese surname. Notable people with the surname include:

- Kenichi Suzumura (born 1974), Japanese voice actor and singer
- Takuya Suzumura (born 1978), Japanese footballer
- Kotaro Suzumura (1944–2020), Japanese economist and academic
