= Takuya Suzumura =

Japanese footballer

Takuya Suzumura 鈴村 拓也
Personal information
- Date of birth: September 13, 1978 (age 48)
- Place of birth: Nagoya, Aichi, Japan
- Height: 1.75 m (5 ft 9 in)
- Position: Midfielder

Youth career
- 1994–1996: Yokkaichi Chuo Technical High School

Senior career*
Years	Team	Apps	(Gls)
1997–1998	Vissel Kobe	6	(0)
Total		6	(0)

International career
2000–2008	Japan Futsal		
- * Club domestic league appearances and goals

Takuya Suzumura (鈴村 拓也, Suzumura Takuya; born September 13, 1978) is a former Japanese football player.

== Football career ==
Suzumura was born in Nagoya on September 13, 1978. After graduating from high school, he joined newly was promoted to J1 League club, Vissel Kobe in 1997. Although he played as defensive midfielder in 1997, he could not play at all in the match in 1998 and retired from football career end of 1998 season.

== Futsal career ==
After retirement from football career, he became a futsal player in 2000. He was selected Japan national futsal team in 2000. He played at AFC Futsal Championship for 9 years in a row (2000-2008). Japan team won the champions in 2006 and the 2nd place 5 times (2002, 2003, 2004, 2005 and 2007). He also played for Japan at 2004 Futsal World Championship.

== Career statistics ==
Appearances and goals by club, season and competition
Club	Season	League			Emperor's Cup		J.League Cup		Total	
Club	Season	Division	Apps	Goals	Apps	Goals	Apps	Goals	Apps	Goals
Vissel Kobe	1997	J1 League	6	0	2	0	0	0	8	0
Vissel Kobe	1998	J1 League	0	0			0	0	0	0
Career total			6	0	2	0	0	0	8	0
