= Mostafa Tayyebi =

Iranian futsal player

Personal information
- Full name: Mostafa Tayyebi
- Date of birth: 9 June 1987 (age 39)
- Place of birth: Mashhad, Iran
- Height: 1.69 m (5 ft 7 in)
- Position: Left winger

Senior career*
Years	Team	Apps	(Gls)
–2010	Elmo Adab		
2010–2011	Foolad Mahan		
2011–2012	→ Firooz Sofeh (loan)		(8)
2012–2013	Shahid Mansouri		(2)
2013–2014	Aboomoslem (football)	12	(1)
2014–2016	Ferdosi Mashhad		(7)
2016	Tarh va Toseh		(1)
2016–2017	Azarakhsh		(3)
2017–2018	Farsh Ara		(12)
2018–2019	Azarakhsh		(4)
2019	Naft Al Janoob		
2019–2020	Mes Sungun		(0)
2020–2021	Al Jinssiya		
2021	Farsh Ara	1	(0)

International career^{‡}
- Iran U23
- Iran
- * Club domestic league appearances and goals as of 9 January 2022 ‡ National team caps and goals as of 7 July 2020

Mostafa Tayyebi (Persian: مصطفی طیبی; born 9 June 1987) is an Iranian professional futsal player.

== Honours ==
=== Country ===
- AFC Futsal Championship
  - Champion (2): 2008 - 2010
- Asian Indoor Games
  - Champion (2): 2007 - 2009

=== Club ===
- Iranian Futsal Super League
  - Champion (1): 2019–20 (Mes Sungun)
