= Majid Latifi =

Iranian futsal player

Personal information
- Full name: Majid Latifi
- Date of birth: 21 March 1981 (age 45)
- Place of birth: Rasht, Iran
- Height: 5 ft 9 in (1.75 m)
- Position: Defender

Senior career*
Years	Team	Apps	(Gls)
2003–2004	Moghavemat Gilan		
2004–2006	Pegah Gilan		
2006–2007	Rah Ahan Tehran		
2007–2009	Eram Kish		
2009–2012	Shahid Mansouri		
2012–2014	Farsh Ara		(15)
2014–2016	Shahid Mansouri		(4)
2016–2017	Shahrdari Rasht		(0)

International career^{‡}
	Iran	120	
- * Club domestic league appearances and goals as of 28 April 2021 ‡ National team caps and goals as of 1 September 2019

Majid Latifi (Persian: مجید لطیفی; born 21 March 1981) is an Iranian former professional futsal player.

== Honours ==
=== Country ===
- AFC Futsal Championship
  - Champion (2): 2007–2008
- Asian Indoor Games
  - Champion (2): 2005–2007
- WAFF Futsal Championship
  - Champion (2): 2007–2012

=== Club ===
- AFC Futsal Club Championship
  - Runner-Up (1): 2011 (Shahid Mansouri)
- Iranian Futsal Super League
  - Champion (2): 2010–11 (Shahid Mansouri) – 2011–12 (Shahid Mansouri)
