= Masoud Daneshvar =

Iranian futsal player

Personal information
- Full name: Masoud Daneshvar
- Date of birth: 30 January 1988 (age 38)
- Place of birth: Shiraz, Iran
- Height: 1.82 m (6 ft 0 in)
- Position: Pivot

Youth career
- Bargh Shiraz
- Fajr Sepasi

Senior career*
Years	Team	Apps	(Gls)
2004–2010	Sadra		
2010–2012	Giti Pasand		(30)
2011	→Shahid Mansouri (loan)	5	(2)
2012	Kuwait SC		
2012–2013	Labaniyat Arjan	9	(7)
2013	Shenzhen Nanling	5	(8)
2013–2014	Mahan Tandis		(0)
2017–2018	Giti Pasand		(4)
2018–2019	Sadra		(6)

International career^{‡}
- Iran U23
	Iran	95	(63)
- * Club domestic league appearances and goals as of 21 January 2022 ‡ National team caps and goals as of 2 January 2022

Masoud Daneshvar (Persian: مسعود دانشور; born 30 January 1988) is an Iranian former professional futsal player.

== Honours ==
=== Country ===
- AFC Futsal Championship
  - Champion (1): 2010
- Asian Indoor Games
  - Champion (2): 2007 - 2009
- WAFF Futsal Championship
  - Champion (1): 2007

=== Club ===
- AFC Futsal Club Championship
  - Runner-Up (1): 2011 (Shahid Mansouri)
- Iranian Futsal Super League
  - Runner-Up (2): 2010–11 (Giti Pasand) - 2011–12 (Giti Pasand)
- Iranian Futsal Hazfi Cup
  - Champion (1): 2013–14 (Mahan Tandis)

=== Individual ===
- Top Goalscorer:
  - Iranian Futsal Super League: 2010–11 (Giti Pasand) (24)

Sporting positions
Preceded by (Iran) Vahid Shamsaei	Iranian Futsal Super League top scorer 10-11 (24 Goals)	Succeeded by (Iran) Ahmad Esmaeilpour
