= Maria Moiseeva =

Uzbekistani footballer

Personal information
- Full name: Maria Moiseeva
- Place of birth: Uzbekistan
- Position: Midfielder

International career^{‡}
| Years | Team | Apps | (Gls) |
| 2009– | Uzbekistan | 5 | (0) |
- ‡ National team caps and goals as of 22:54, 20 March 2015 (UTC)

Maria Moiseeva is an Uzbekistani women's football midfielder.

== See also ==
- List of Uzbekistan women's international footballers
