= Makhliyo Sarikova =

Uzbekistani footballer

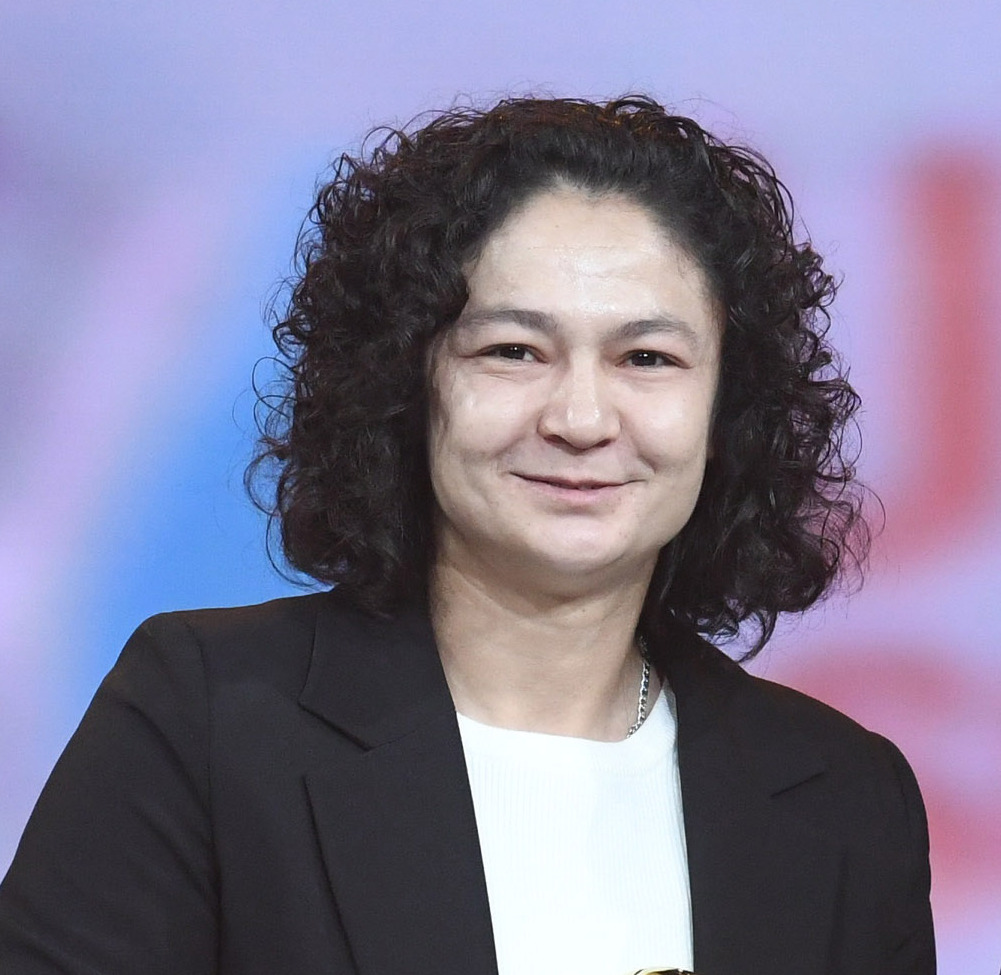
- Makhliyo Sarikova in 2022 UzFootball Awards Ceremony

Personal information
- Full name: Makhliyo Sarikova
- Date of birth: 3 March 1990 (age 36)
- Place of birth: Tashkent, Uzbekistan
- Position: Forward

Team information
- Current team: SShVSM-Kairat

Senior career*
Years	Team	Apps	(Gls)
- Sevinch Qarshi
- SShVSM-Kairat

International career
- Uzbekistan
- Uzbekistan (futsal)
- * Club domestic league appearances and goals

Makhliyo Sarikova is an Uzbekistani women's football striker currently playing for SSVSM-Kairat Almaty in the Kazakhstani Championship. She made her UEFA Champions League in October 2013, scoring one goal against Arsenal LFC.

She is a member of the Uzbekistani national team. She scored five of Uzbekistan's six goals in the 2012 Summer Olympics AFC Qualifiers' Second Round. She has also played for the national futsal team, winning a bronze in the 2007 Asian Indoor Games.

== International goals ==
Scores and results list Uzbekistan's goal tally first.

No.	Date	Venue	Opponent	Score	Result	Competition
1.	27 April 2009	KLFA Stadium, Kuala Lumpur, Malaysia	Maldives	1–0	5–0	2010 AFC Women's Asian Cup qualification
2.	29 April 2009	KLFA Stadium, Kuala Lumpur, Malaysia	Palestine	3–0	5–0	2010 AFC Women's Asian Cup qualification
3.	3 May 2009	KLFA Stadium, Kuala Lumpur, Malaysia	Jordan	2–1	2–2	2010 AFC Women's Asian Cup qualification
4.	20 March 2011	Bangabandhu National Stadium, Dhaka, Bangladesh	Bangladesh	2–0	3–0	2012 Summer Olympics qualifying
5.	23 March 2011	Bir Sherestha Shaheed Shipahi Mostafa Kamal Stadium, Dhaka, Bangladesh	India	5–1	5–1	2012 Summer Olympics qualifying
6.	3 June 2011	Amman International Stadium, Amman, Jordan	Thailand	1–0	1–5	2012 Summer Olympics qualifying
7.	5 June 2011	King Abdullah Stadium, Amman, Jordan	Jordan	2–0	3–0	2012 Summer Olympics qualifying
8.	5 June 2011	King Abdullah Stadium, Amman, Jordan	Jordan	3–0	3–0	2012 Summer Olympics qualifying
9.	10 June 2011	Amman International Stadium, Amman, Jordan	Vietnam	1–0	2–1	2012 Summer Olympics qualifying
10.	10 June 2011	Amman International Stadium, Amman, Jordan	Vietnam	2–0	2–1	2012 Summer Olympics qualifying
11.	5 June 2013	Amman International Stadium, Amman, Jordan	Kuwait	6–0	18–0	2014 AFC Women's Asian Cup qualification
12.	11 March 2015	Petra Stadium, Amman, Jordan	Palestine	1–0	6–0	2016 AFC Women's Olympic Qualifying Tournament
13.	9 April 2019	Lokomotiv Stadium, Tashkent, Uzbekistan	Hong Kong	1–0	5–1	2020 AFC Women's Olympic Qualifying Tournament
14.	9 April 2019	Lokomotiv Stadium, Tashkent, Uzbekistan	Hong Kong	2–0	5–1	2020 AFC Women's Olympic Qualifying Tournament
15.	9 April 2019	Lokomotiv Stadium, Tashkent, Uzbekistan	Hong Kong	4–1	5–1	2020 AFC Women's Olympic Qualifying Tournament
16.	20 September 2021	Pakhtakor Stadium, Tashkent, Uzbekistan	Mongolia	6–0	12–0	2022 AFC Women's Asian Cup qualification
17.	20 September 2021	Pakhtakor Stadium, Tashkent, Uzbekistan	Mongolia	9–0	12–0	2022 AFC Women's Asian Cup qualification
18.	20 September 2021	Pakhtakor Stadium, Tashkent, Uzbekistan	Mongolia	12–0	12–0	2022 AFC Women's Asian Cup qualification

== See also ==
- List of Uzbekistan women's international footballers
