= Komola Usmanova =

Uzbekistani footballer

Personal information
- Place of birth: Tashkent, Uzbekistan
- Position: Midfielder

International career^{‡}
Years	Team	Apps	(Gls)
2001–2009	Uzbekistan	6	(4)
- ‡ National team caps and goals as of 6 July 2009

Komola Usmanova is an Uzbekistani former footballer who played as a midfielder. She has been a member of the Uzbekistan women's national team.

== International career ==
Usmanova capped for Uzbekistan at senior level during the 2010 AFC Women's Asian Cup qualification.

== International goals ==
No.	Date	Venue	Opponent	Score	Result	Competition
1.	27 April 2009	KLFA Stadium, Kuala Lumpur, Malaysia	Maldives	2–0	5–0	2010 AFC Women's Asian Cup qualification
2.	1 May 2009	KLFA Stadium, Kuala Lumpur, Malaysia	Kyrgyzstan	1–0	2–0	2010 AFC Women's Asian Cup qualification
3.	6 July 2009	Rajamangala Stadium, Bangkok, Thailand	Iran	3–1	4–1	2010 AFC Women's Asian Cup qualification
4.	6 July 2009	Rajamangala Stadium, Bangkok, Thailand	Iran	4–1	4–1	2010 AFC Women's Asian Cup qualification

== See also ==
- List of Uzbekistan women's international footballers
