= Makhfuza Turapova =

Uzbekistani footballer

Personal information
- Full name: Makhfuza Turapova
- Place of birth: Tashkent, Uzbekistan
- Position: Midfielder

International career^{‡}
Years	Team	Apps	(Gls)
2009–	Uzbekistan	4	(2)
- ‡ National team caps and goals as of 22:57, 20 March 2015 (UTC)

Makhfuza Turapova is an Uzbekistani women's football midfielder.

== International goals ==
No.	Date	Venue	Opponent	Score	Result	Competition
1.	3 May 2009	KLFA Stadium, Kuala Lumpur, Malaysia	Jordan	1–0	2–2	2010 AFC Women's Asian Cup qualification
2.	5 June 2013	Amman International Stadium, Amman, Jordan	Kuwait	7–0	18–0	2014 AFC Women's Asian Cup qualification
3.	5 June 2013	Amman International Stadium, Amman, Jordan	Kuwait	9–0	18–0	2014 AFC Women's Asian Cup qualification
4.	5 June 2013	Amman International Stadium, Amman, Jordan	Kuwait	14–0	18–0	2014 AFC Women's Asian Cup qualification

== See also ==
- List of Uzbekistan women's international footballers
