= Serge Said =

Lebanese footballer (born 1985)

Personal information
- Full name: Serge Dovlet Said
- Date of birth: 11 November 1985 (age 41)
- Place of birth: Beirut, Lebanon
- Position: Attacking midfielder

Team information
- Current team: Lebanon U17 (assistant coach)

Senior career*
Years	Team	Apps	(Gls)
–2007	Homenmen		
2007–2022	Racing Beirut	160+	(13+)
2022–2023	Sagesse	16	(0)
Total		176+	(13+)

International career
2012–2016	Lebanon	8	(0)

Managerial career
- 2023–2024: Sagesse (assistant)
- 2026–: Lebanon U17 (assistant)
- * Club domestic league appearances and goals

Serge Dovlet Said (Arabic: سيرج دولت سعيد; born 11 November 1985) is a Lebanese football coach and former player who is the assistant coach of the Lebanon national under-17 team.

Said played as an attacking midfielder for Homenmen, Racing Beirut and Sagesse at the club level, and the Lebanon national team internationally.

== Club career ==
Said began his career at Homenmen, and moved to Racing Beirut in 2007. He stayed with Racing for 15 years, before he left the team on 30 June 2022. On 8 July, Said signed for Sagesse.

== International career ==
Said made his international debut for Lebanon in a friendly match against Iraq on 22 January 2012, which resulted in a 1–0 home win. He made eight caps, playing his last game against Equatorial Guinea on 11 October 2016.

== Managerial career ==
In June 2023, Sagesse announced Said as a new assistant coach. In 2026, he was the assistant coach of the Lebanon national under-17 team.

== Honours ==
Racing Beirut

- Lebanese Challenge Cup: 2016, 2017
