= Surapong Tompa =

Thai futsal player

Personal information
- Full name: Surapong Tompa
- Date of birth: 25 November 1978 (age 47)
- Place of birth: Nakhon Phanom, Thailand
- Height: 1.75 m (5 ft 9 in)
- Position: Goalkeeper

Team information
- Current team: Port Authority of Thailand FC
- Number: 12

International career^{‡}
Years	Team	Apps	(Gls)
2006–	Thailand	15	(0)
- ‡ National team caps and goals as of 13:05, 23 May 2008 (UTC)

Surapong Tompa (Thai สุรพงษ์ ทมพา), is a Thai futsal goalkeeper, and currently a member of Thailand national futsal team.

He competed for Thailand at the 2008 FIFA Futsal World Cup finals in Brazil.
