= Kiatiyot Chalarmkhet =

Thai futsal player (born 1989)

Personal information
- Full name: Kiatiyot Chalarmkhet
- Date of birth: 2 November 1989 (age 36)
- Place of birth: Bangkok, Thailand
- Height: 1.63 m (5 ft 4 in)
- Position: Winger

Team information
- Current team: Department of Highways Futsal Club
- Number: 14

Senior career*
| Years | Team | Apps | (Gls) |
| 2009–10 | CAT Telecom | | |
| 2010–2015 | Chonburi Blue Wave | | |
| 2016– | Department of Highways Futsal Club | | |

International career^{‡}
| 2007– | Thailand Futsal | 33 | (19) |
Medal record
Thailand national football team
AFF Futsal Championship
| Gold medal – first place | AFF Futsal Championship 2009 | Futsal |
Asian Indoor Games
| Silver medal – second place | Asian Indoor Games 2009 | Futsal |
Asian Championship
| Silver medal – second place | AFC Futsal Championship 2008 | Futsal |
- * Club domestic league appearances and goals ‡ National team caps and goals as of 13:05, 23 May 2008 (UTC)

Kiatiyot Chalarmkhet (Thai: เกียรติยศ แฉล้มเขตร์; born 2 November 1989), nickname MIX. He is now playing for Thailand national futsal team.

As a promising youngster, he scored 3 goals in 3 games of AFC Futsal championship first round, even though he had given short opportunity to play in each game.

== Bibliography ==
- AFC Futsal Championship 2008
- TFL Thailand Futsal League
