= Natthapon Suttiroj =

Thai futsal player (born 1983)

Personal information
- Full name: Natthapon Suttiroj
- Date of birth: 27 January 1983 (age 43)
- Place of birth: Bangkok, Thailand
- Height: 1.74 m (5 ft 8 1/2 in)
- Position: Midfielder

Team information
- Current team: Chonburi Bluewave

International career^{‡}
Years	Team	Apps	(Gls)
2005–	Thailand Futsal	25	(10)
- ‡ National team caps and goals as of 13:05, 23 May 2008 (UTC)

Natthapon Suttiroj (Thai ณัฐพล สุทธิโรจน์), is a Thai futsal Midfielder, and currently a member of Thailand national futsal team.

He competed for Thailand at the 2008 FIFA Futsal World Cup finals in Brazil.
