= Ekkapan Suratsawang =

Thai futsal player

Personal information
- Full name: Ekkapan Suratsawang
- Date of birth: 27 June 1986 (age 40)
- Place of birth: Yala, Thailand
- Height: 1.68 m (5 ft 6 in)
- Position: Striker

Team information
- Current team: Chonburi Blue Wave

International career^{‡}
Years	Team	Apps	(Gls)
2008–	Thailand	9	(8)
- ‡ National team caps and goals as of 13:05, 23 May 2008 (UTC)

Ekkapan Suratsawang (Thai เอกพันธ์ สุรัตน์สว่าง), is a Thai futsal Striker, and currently a member of Thailand national futsal team.

He competed for Thailand at the 2008 FIFA Futsal World Cup finals in Brazil.
