= Yusuke Komiyama =

Japanese futsal player

Personal information
- Full name: Yusuke Komiyama
- Date of birth: 22 December 1979 (age 46)
- Place of birth: Kanagawa Prefecture, Japan
- Height: 1.72 m (5 ft 7 1/2 in)
- Position: Defender

International career
Years	Team	Apps	(Gls)
–	Japan		

Yusuke Komiyama (born 22 December 1979), is a Japanese futsal player. Japanese national futsal team.

== Clubs ==
- 2000-2006 FIRE FOX
- 2007-2016 Bardral Urayasu

== Titles ==
- All Japan Futsal Championship (1)
  - 2008
