= Panomkorn Saisorn =

Thai footballer and futsal player (born 1981)

Personal information
- Full name: Panomkorn Saisorn
- Date of birth: 31 December 1981 (age 44)
- Place of birth: Yasothon, Thailand
- Height: 1.68 m (5 ft 6 in)
- Position: Midfielder

Senior career*
Years	Team	Apps	(Gls)
2009	Police United		
2010	Chonburi Bluewave		
2011	GH Bank-RBAC Futsal Club		
2012	Police United	17	(1)
2013–2015	TOT	56	(4)
2017–2018	Chamchuri United	29	(0)

International career^{‡}
- Thailand Futsal
- * Club domestic league appearances and goals ‡ National team caps and goals as of 13:05, 23 May 2008 (UTC)

Panomkorn Saisorn (Thai พนมกรณ์ สายสอน) is a Thai retired association football and futsal midfielder, and is a member of Thailand national futsal team.
