= Lertchai Issarasuwipakorn =

Thai futsal player

Personal information
- Date of birth: 2 November 1982 (age 43)
- Place of birth: Khon Kaen, Thailand
- Height: 1.81 m (5 ft 11 in)
- Position: Defender

Team information
- Current team: Port
- Number: 6

Senior career*
Years	Team	Apps	(Gls)
2007–2009	Chonburi Blue Wave		
2010	Fuchu Athletic		
2011	Chonburi Blue Wave		
2012	Nagoya Oceans		
2012–2015	Chonburi Blue Wave		
2015–	Thai Port Futsal Club		

International career^{‡}
2000–	Thailand Futsal	67	(29)
- * Club domestic league appearances and goals ‡ National team caps and goals as of 06:37, 13 July 2016 (UTC)

Lertchai Issarasuwipakorn (Thai: เลิศชาย อิสราสุวิภากร, born 2 November 1982 in Khon Kaen, Thailand) is a Thai futsal Defender.

He competed for Thailand at the 2004 and 2008 FIFA Futsal World Cup finals.
