= Sermphan Khumthinkaew =

Thai futsal player

Personal information
- Date of birth: 1 October 1981 (age 45)
- Place of birth: Ang Thong, Thailand
- Height: 1.70 m (5 ft 7 in)
- Position: Defender

Team information
- Current team: TOT FC

International career^{‡}
Years	Team	Apps	(Gls)
2003–	Thailand	57	(13)
- ‡ National team caps and goals as of 13:05, 23 May 2008 (UTC)

Sermphan Khumthinkaew (Thai: เสริมพันธ์ คุ้มถิ่นแก้ว, born 1 October 1981) is a Thai futsal Defender, and currently a member of Thailand national futsal team.

He competed for Thailand at the 2004 and 2008 FIFA Futsal World Cup finals.
