= Panuwat Janta =

Thai futsal player

Personal information
- Date of birth: 1979 (age 46–47)
- Place of birth: Chantaburi, Thailand
- Height: 1.74 m (5 ft 9 in)
- Position: Defender

Team information
- Current team: GH Bank RBAC
- Number: 4

International career^{‡}
Years	Team	Apps	(Gls)
2000–	Thailand	62	(48)
- ‡ National team caps and goals as of 13:05, 23 May 2008 (UTC)

Panuwat Janta (Thai: ภานุวัฒน์ จันทา, born 1979 in Chantaburi, Thailand) is a Thai futsal Defender, and currently the captain of Thailand national futsal team.

He competed for Thailand at the 2000, 2004 and 2008 FIFA Futsal World Cup finals.
