= 2023 Vietnam Futsal League =

Vietnam Futsal League
- Dates: 19 March – 14 August 2023
- AFC Futsal Club Championship: Thài Son Nam
- Matches: 32
- Goals: 120 (3.75 per match)
- Top goalscorer: (Vietnam) Trần Minh Tuấn (Savinest Khánh Hòa)
- Biggest home win: Sahako F.C 4–0 Cao Bằng (20 March 2023); Sahako F.C 5–1 Tân Hiệp Hưng (27 March 2023)
- Biggest away win: Sahako F.C 0–4 Cao Bằng (13 April 2023); GFDI Sông Hàn 0–4 TSN Hồ Chí Minh City (18 April 2023)
- Highest scoring: 7 goals Savinest Khánh Hòa 3–4 Sahako F.C (2 April 2023)
- Longest winning run: TSN Hồ Chí Minh City; Tân Hiệp Hưng; Cao Bằng (3 matches)
- Longest unbeaten run: TSN Hồ Chí Minh City (8 matches)
- Longest winless run: Cao Bằng (8 matches)
- Longest losing run: Cao Bằng (7 matches)
- Highest attendance: Sahako F.C 1–1 TSN Hồ Chí Minh City (2,000)

The 2023 Vietnam Futsal League was the fourteenth season of the Vietnam Futsal League, the Vietnam professional futsal league for futsal clubs. This season is hold by VFF and VOV Channel. The main sponsorship of this season are HD Bank and Cityland.

== Changes from the previous season ==
=== New Clubs ===
- Hà Nội F.C
- GFDI Sông Hàn

=== Name Changes ===
- Thái Sơn Nam F.C changed name into TSN Hồ Chí Minh City Futsal Club

=== Withdrew ===
- Đà Nẵng F.C
- Daklak F.C
- Sài Gòn F.C

== Teams ==
=== Stadiums and locations ===
Team	Location	Home Stadium	Capacity
Hà Nội F.C	Hà Nội	Mỹ Đình Palace of Athletics	3,110
Sanvinest Khánh Hòa	Khánh Hòa	Nha Trang Pedagogical College Hall	1,000
Thái Sơn Bắc	Hà Nội	Mỹ Đình Palace of Athletics	3,110
TSN Hồ Chí Minh City	Ho Chi Minh City	Thái Sơn Nam District 8 Arena	350
Tân Hiệp Hưng	Ho Chi Minh City	Lãnh Binh Thăng Arena	2,000
GFDI Sông Hàn	Đà Nẵng	Tiên Sơn Arena	7,200
Cao Bằng	Cao Bằng	Thái Sơn Nam District 8 Arena	350
Sahako F.C	Ho Chi Minh City	Lãnh Binh Thăng Arena	2,000

=== Personnel and kits ===
Note: Flags indicate national team as has been defined under FIFA eligibility rules. Players may hold more than one non-FIFA nationality.

Team	Manager	Captain	Kit manufacturer
Cao Bang	(Vietnam) Phạm Minh Giang	(Vietnam) Nguyễn Văn Quốc Huy	(Vietnam) Egan
GFDI Sông Hàn	(Vietnam) Huỳnh Việt Nam	(Vietnam) Đặng Phước Hạnh	(Vietnam) Egan
Hanoi	(Vietnam) Nguyễn Đình Hoàng	(Vietnam) Bùi Ngọc Long	(Vietnam) Kamito
Savinest Khánh Hòa	(Vietnam) Nguyễn Quốc Đàn (Vietnam) Mai Thành Đạt	(Vietnam) Phan Khắc Chí	(Vietnam) Fraser
Sahako	(Vietnam) Nguyễn Tuấn Anh	(Vietnam) Khổng Đình Hùng	(Vietnam) Egan
Tân Hiệp Hưng	(Vietnam) Trương Quốc Tuấn	(Vietnam) Trần Tấn Đông	(Vietnam) Kamito
Thái Sơn Bắc	(Spain) Victor Acosta Garcia	(Vietnam) Lê Quang Vinh	(Thailand) Grand Sport
TSN Ho Chi Minh City	(Argentina) Nicolas Gustavo (Vietnam) Nguyễn Minh Hải	(Vietnam) Trần Văn Vũ	(Japan) Mizuno

=== Foreign players ===
- Each team may register a maximum of 1 foreign player and 1 Overseas Vietnamese player.

Clubs	Player 1	Former player
Hà Nội F.C	-	-
Sanvinest Khánh Hòa	-	-
Thái Sơn Bắc	(Brazil) Anderson Da Rocha E Silva	-
TSN Hồ Chí Minh City	(Finland) Aleksi Pirttijoki	(Iran) Abolghasem Orouji
Tân Hiệp Hưng	-	-
GFDI Sông Hàn	-	-
Cao Bằng	-	-
Sahako F.C	(Brazil) Italo Henrique Bob	-

=== Dual nationality players ===
- Players name in **bold** indicates the player was registered after the start of the season.
- Player's name in italics indicates Overseas Vietnamese players whom have obtained a Vietnamese passport and citizenship, therefore being considered as local players.

Clubs	Player 1
Hà Nội F.C	-
Sanvinest Khánh Hòa	-
Thái Sơn Bắc	-
TSN Hồ Chí Minh City	-
Tân Hiệp Hưng	-
GFDI Sông Hàn	-
Cao Bằng	-
Sahako F.C	-

== Standings ==
=== League table ===
Pos	Team	Pld	W	D	L	GF	GA	GD	Pts	Qualification or relegation
1	TSN Hồ Chí Minh City (Q)	14	8	6	0	38	18	+20	30	Qualification for 2024 AFC Futsal Club Championship
2	Sahako F.C	14	9	2	3	52	30	+22	29	Qualification for 2024 AFF Futsal Club Championship
3	Thái Sơn Bắc	14	8	2	4	28	20	+8	26	
4	Savinest Khánh Hòa	14	6	3	5	27	21	+6	21	
5	Tân Hiệp Hưng	14	4	3	7	24	36	−12	15	
6	Cao Bằng F.C	14	4	2	8	16	28	−12	14	
7	GFDI Sông Hàn	14	4	1	9	17	29	−12	13	
8	Hà Nội F.C	14	3	1	10	18	38	−20	10	

Source: VFF
Rules for classification: 1) Points; 2) Head-to-head points 3) Goal difference; 4) Goals scored; 5) Disciplinary points; 6) Play-off (Only to decide champions, runners-up, third placed and relegation spots); 7) Drawing of lots
(Q) Qualified for the phase indicated

== Results ==
Home \ Away	CBF	GSH	HNF	SKH	SHK	THH	TSB	TSN
Cao Bằng F.C	—	2–1	0–1	2–0	1–4	2–2	0–3	1–2
GFDI Sông Hàn	2–1	—	2–0	1–2	3–1	0–1	1–3	0–4
Hà Nội F.C	1–2	2–1	—	0–1	3–8	1–4	1–3	0–3
Savinest Khánh Hòa	4–1	3–0	4–1	—	3–4	2–2	0–1	2–2
Sahako F.C	4–0	5–2	1–3	4–1	—	5–1	0–4	1–1
Tân Hiệp Hưng	1–2	1–2	4–2	0–4	2–6	—	3–1	1–4
Thái Sơn Bắc	1–0	3–1	2–2	1–1	1–4	2–0	—	1–4
TSN Hồ Chí Minh City	2–2	1–1	3–1	2–0	5–5	2–2	3–1	—

Source: VFF
Legend: Blue = home team win; Yellow = draw; Red = away team win.

== Season statistics ==
=== Top goalscorers ===
As of 29 June, 2023

No	Player	Club	Goal
1	(Vietnam) Trần Minh Tuấn	Sanvinest Khánh Hòa	7
2	(Vietnam) Trần Nhật Trung	Sahako	5
2	(Vietnam) Nguyễn Văn Tuấn	Thái Sơn Bắc	5
2	(Vietnam) Nguyễn Thịnh Phát	TSN Hồ Chí Minh City	5
3	(Vietnam) Nguyễn Nhân Nam	Hà Nội	4
3	(Vietnam) Trần Văn Thanh	Sanvinest Khánh Hòa	4
3	(Vietnam) Đào Minh Quảng	Tân Hiệp Hưng	4
3	(Vietnam) Từ Minh Quang	Thái Sơn Bắc	4
3	(Vietnam) Nguyễn Minh Trí	TSN Hồ Chí Minh City	4
3	(Vietnam) Nhan Gia Hưng	TSN Hồ Chí Minh City	4
4	(Vietnam) Phan Khắc Chí	Sanvinest Khánh Hòa	3
4	(Vietnam) Lâm Tấn Phát	Sahako	3
4	(Vietnam) Dương Ngọc Linh	TSN Hồ Chí Minh City	3
5	(Vietnam) Cao Hoài An	Cao Bằng	2
5	(Vietnam) Nguyễn Trần Duy	GFDI Sông Hàn	2
5	(Vietnam) Ngô Ngọc Sơn	Sahako	2
5	(Vietnam) Trần Quang Toàn	Sahako	2
5	(Vietnam) Đoàn Minh Quang	Sahako	2
5	(Vietnam) Nguyễn Xuân An	Tân Hiệp Hưng	2
5	(Vietnam) Trịnh Quang Vinh	Tân Hiệp Hưng	2
5	(Vietnam) Trần Tấn Đông	Tân Hiệp Hưng	2
5	(Vietnam) Lê Quang Vinh	Thái Sơn Bắc	2
5	(Vietnam) An Lâm Tới	Thái Sơn Bắc	2
5	(Vietnam) Trần Thái Huy	TSN Hồ Chí Minh City	2
6	(Vietnam) Nguyễn Trọng Tín	Cao Bằng	1
6	(Vietnam) Lê Trí Nhân	Cao Bằng	1
6	(Vietnam) Nguyễn Lâm Gia Thọ	Cao Bằng	1
6	(Vietnam) Nguyễn Huỳnh Thanh Huy	Cao Bằng	1
6	(Vietnam) Nguyễn Văn Nghĩa	GFDI Sông Hàn	1
6	(Vietnam) Nguyễn Hữu Thắng	GFDI Sông Hàn	1
6	(Vietnam) Hồ Khánh Huy	GFDI Sông Hàn	1
6	(Vietnam) Võ Duy Bình	GFDI Sông Hàn	1
6	(Vietnam) Phan Văn Chương	GFDI Sông Hàn	1
6	(Vietnam) Đào Công Hoàng	Hà Nội	1
6	(Vietnam) Tạ Đức Minh Hiếu	Hà Nội	1
6	(Vietnam) Đỗ Văn Thành	Hà Nội	1
6	(Vietnam) Dương Công Kiên	Hà Nội	1
6	(Vietnam) Huỳnh Tấn Lực	Hà Nội	1
6	(Vietnam) Nguyễn Thạc Hiếu	Hà Nội	1
6	(Vietnam) Nguyễn Văn Đạt	Hà Nội	1
6	(Vietnam) Nguyễn Hữu Phúc	Sanvinest Khánh Hòa	1
6	(Vietnam) Huỳnh Huy Hảo	Sanvinest Khánh Hòa	1
6	(Vietnam) Pi Năng Thái An	Sanvinest Khánh Hòa	1
6	(Vietnam) Phan Bảo Phúc	Sanvinest Khánh Hòa	1
6	(Vietnam) Huỳnh Mi Woen	Sahako	1
6	(Vietnam) Lưu Nhất Tiến	Sahako	1
6	(Vietnam) Đặng Phi Tiến	Sahako	1
6	(Vietnam) Khổng Đình Hùng	Sahako	1
6	(Brazil) Ítalo Henrique	Sahako	1
6	(Vietnam) Đinh Bộ Thành	Tân Hiệp Hưng	1
6	(Vietnam) Nguyễn Công Hai	Tân Hiệp Hưng	1
6	(Vietnam) Huỳnh Quốc Tâm	Tân Hiệp Hưng	1
6	(Vietnam) Trần Gia Huy	Tân Hiệp Hưng	1
6	(Vietnam) Vũ Ngọc Lân	Tân Hiệp Hưng	1
6	(Vietnam) Phạm Tấn Phát	Tân Hiệp Hưng	1
6	(Vietnam) Nguyễn Thành Tín	Thái Sơn Bắc	1
6	(Vietnam) Vũ Ngọc Ánh	Thái Sơn Bắc	1
6	(Vietnam) Triệu Xuân Linh	Thái Sơn Bắc	1
6	(Vietnam) Bùi Đình Văn	Thái Sơn Bắc	1
6	(Vietnam) Phạm Văn Tú	Thái Sơn Bắc	1
6	(Brazil) Anderson da Rocha	Thái Sơn Bắc	1
6	(Vietnam) Châu Đoàn Phát	TSN Hồ Chí Minh City	1
6	(Vietnam) Phạm Đức Hòa	TSN Hồ Chí Minh City	1
6	(Vietnam) Nguyễn Anh Duy	TSN Hồ Chí Minh City	1

==== Own Goals ====
No	Player	Club	Opponents	Goal
1	(Vietnam) Trần Văn Thanh	Sanvinest Khánh Hòa	Sahako	1
1	(Vietnam) Cổ Chí Kiệt	Cao Bằng	GFDI Sông Hàn	1
1	(Vietnam) Trương Trần Quang Nhật	Cao Bằng	Hà Nội	1

==== Hat-tricks ====
Player	Team	Opponents	Result	Date	Round
(Vietnam) Trần Minh Tuấn	Sanvinest Khánh Hòa	GFDI Sông Hàn	3–0 (H)	19 March	1
(Vietnam) Phan Khắc Chí	Sanvinest Khánh Hòa	Cao Bằng	4–1 (H)	8 April	4
