= 2015 Vietnam National Futsal League =

Giải Futsal Vô địch Quốc gia 2015
- Season: 2015
- Champions: Sanna Khánh Hòa
- Best Player: Thành Đạt (Sanna KH)
- Top goalscorer: Văn Vũ (TSN); Nguyễn Phúc (Sannatech KH)
- Best goalkeeper: Văn Huy (TSB)

It was the sixth season of the Vietnam Futsal League, the Vietnam professional futsal league for association football clubs.

== First stage ==
=== Group A ===
Team	Pld	W	D	L	GF	GA	GD	Pts
Sanna Khánh Hòa	4	3	0	1	8	4	+4	9
Thái Sơn Nam	4	3	0	1	19	9	+10	9
HPN Phú Nhuận	4	1	1	2	9	8	+1	3 (Note: HPN Phú Nhuận and Casanco were docked 1 point)
HT Đà Nẵng	4	1	0	3	5	13	−8	3
Casanco	4	1	1	2	9	15	−6	3

=== Group B ===
Team	Pld	W	D	L	GF	GA	GD	Pts
Sannatech Khánh Hòa	4	2	2	0	12	9	+3	8
Bình Thuận	4	2	1	1	11	10	+1	7
Thái Sơn Bắc	4	2	1	1	14	10	+4	7
Tân Hiệp Hưng	4	2	0	2	11	8	+3	6
Ninh Thuận	4	0	0	4	5	16	−11	0

== Second stage ==
Pos	Team	Pld	W	D	L	GF	GA	GD	Pts	Qualification
1	Sanna Khánh Hòa (C)	7	6	1	0	32	15	+17	19	AFC Futsal Club Championship
2	Thái Sơn Bắc	7	6	0	1	36	24	+12	18	
3	Thái Sơn Nam	7	4	1	2	28	19	+9	13	
4	Sannatech Khánh Hòa	7	3	1	3	31	30	+1	10	
5	Tân Hiệp Hưng	7	2	3	2	16	17	−1	9	
6	Hoàng Thư Đà Nẵng	7	2	1	4	19	32	−13	7	
7	Hải Phương Nam Phú Nhuận	7	1	0	6	16	28	−12	3	
8	BV An Phước Bình Thuận	7	0	1	6	12	24	−12	1	

Rules for classification: 1) points; 2) goal difference; 3) number of goals scored.
(C) Champions
