= Phạm Đức Hòa =

Vietnamese futsal player

Personal information
- Date of birth: 12 April 1991 (age 35)
- Place of birth: Hồ Chí Minh City, Vietnam
- Position: Midfielder

Team information
- Current team: Thái Sơn Nam HCMC
- Number: 6

Youth career
- –2008: Quân khu 7
- 2008–2011: TDC Bình Dương
- 2011: Becamex Bình Dương

Senior career*
| Years | Team | Apps | (Gls) |
| 2010–2011 | TDC Bình Dương (loan) | | |
| 2012–2013 | VLT Đà Nẵng | | |
| 2014–2015 | Hải Phương Nam Phú Nhuận | | |
| 2016–2020 | Thái Sơn Nam | | |
| 2020 | O Parrulo Ferrol | 4 | (1) |
| 2021–2025 | Thái Sơn Nam HCMC | | |

International career
| 2014–2025 | Vietnam | | |
- * Club domestic league appearances and goals

Phạm Đức Hòa (born 12 April 1991) is a futsal player who previously played as an ala (midfielder) for Vietnam Futsal League team Thái Sơn Nam HCMC and the Vietnam national futsal team.

== Early career ==
Đức Hòa was a youth product of football clubs Quân khu 7 and TDC Bình Dương.

== Club career ==
Đức Hòa was promoted to TDC Bình Dương first team in 2010 and played in the V.League 2 with the team. He was part of the that finished as runners-up at the 2011 Vietnamese National U-21 Championship. After the tournament, Đức Hòa decided to end his football career to concentrate on his university studies.

In 2012, he started his futsal career, playing for VLT Đà Nẵng. In 2014, he joined Hải Phương Nam Phú Nhuận. After two seasons at the club, he was recruited by Vietnamese futsal giant Thái Sơn Nam. With the team, he won the Vietnam Futsal League for five times in a row, from 2016 to 2020. He also took part in AFC Futsal Club Championship for three seasons, helped his club finished third place twice and runners-up once. During the 2018 AFC Futsal Club Championship, he scored the winning goal in the semi-final match to help his team advance to the final.

In 2020, Đức Hòa joined Spanish club O Parrulo Ferrol, signing a one-year contract, thus becoming the first Vietnamese futsal player to play in Europe. He scored his first goal in the 2020–21 Primera División de Futsal against Burela. However, the league was cancelled after five rounds due to the effects of the COVID-19 pandemic in Spain.

In 2021, Đức Hòa made his return to Thái Sơn Nam. He won two more Vietnam Futsal League titles in 2021 and 2023. In February 2024, he was given the Vietnamese Futsal Golden Ball award.

On 31 December 2025, he announced his retirement from futsal in his Facebook account.

== International career ==
In 2016, Đức Hòa took part in the Vietnam's first ever 2016 FIFA Futsal World Cup. The team reached the round of 16 and was given the Fair-Play Award in a historic campaign.

In 2021, Đức Hòa participated for the second time with Vietnam in the FIFA Futsal World Cup. Vietnam once again advance to the knockout stage and the round of 16 game, Đức Hòa scored his first World Cup goal in a 2–3 defeat against Russia.

== International goals ==
| No. | Date | Venue | Opponent | Score | Result | Competition |
|---|---|---|---|---|---|---|
| 1. | 2 May 2014 | Hồ Chí Minh City, Vietnam | Tajikistan | 5–1 | 10–4 | 2014 AFC Futsal Championship |
| 2. | 21 September 2014 | Shah Alam, Malaysia | Philippines | 7–0 | 11–1 | 2014 AFF Futsal Championship |
| 3. | 21 September 2014 | Shah Alam, Malaysia | Philippines | 8–0 | 11–1 | 2014 AFF Futsal Championship |
| 4. | 21 September 2014 | Shah Alam, Malaysia | Philippines | 10–1 | 11–1 | 2014 AFF Futsal Championship |
| 5. | 21 September 2014 | Shah Alam, Malaysia | Philippines | 11–1 | 11–1 | 2014 AFF Futsal Championship |
| 6. | 22 September 2014 | Shah Alam, Malaysia | Laos | 8–0 | 18–0 | 2014 AFF Futsal Championship |
| 7. | 22 September 2014 | Shah Alam, Malaysia | Laos | 14–0 | 18–0 | 2014 AFF Futsal Championship |
| 8. | 22 September 2014 | Shah Alam, Malaysia | Laos | 18–0 | 18–0 | 2014 AFF Futsal Championship |
| 9. | 11 October 2015 | Bangkok, Thailand | Philippines | 1–0 | 19–1 | 2015 AFF Futsal Championship |
| 10. | 11 October 2015 | Bangkok, Thailand | Philippines | 3–0 | 19–1 | 2015 AFF Futsal Championship |
| 11. | 11 October 2015 | Bangkok, Thailand | Philippines | 8–? | 19–1 | 2015 AFF Futsal Championship |
| 12. | 20 August 2017 | Shah Alam, Malaysia | Malaysia | 1–1 | 1–1 | 2017 SEA Games |
| 13. | 25 August 2017 | Shah Alam, Malaysia | Indonesia | 1–1 | 4–1 | 2017 SEA Games |
| 14. | 20 September 2017 | Ashgabat, Turkmenistan | Solomon Islands | 1–0 | 2–1 | 2017 Asian Indoor and Martial Arts Games |
| 15. | 22 October 2017 | Changshu, China | Netherlands | 2–2 | 2–2 | Friendly |
| 16. | 27 October 2017 | Hồ Chí Minh City, Vietnam | Philippines | 6–0 | 24–0 | 2018 AFF Futsal Championship |
| 17. | 27 October 2017 | Hồ Chí Minh City, Vietnam | Philippines | 21–0 | 24–0 | 2018 AFF Futsal Championship |
| 18. | 27 October 2017 | Hồ Chí Minh City, Vietnam | Philippines | 22–0 | 24–0 | 2018 AFF Futsal Championship |
| 19. | 5 February 2018 | New Taipei City, Taiwan | Chinese Taipei | 2–1 | 3–1 | 2018 AFC Futsal Championship |
| 20. | 23 June 2018 | Changsha, China | China | 2–0 | 4–0 | Friendly |
| 21. | 5 November 2018 | Yogyakarta, Indonesia | Brunei | 7–0 | 9–0 | 2018 AFF Futsal Championship |
| 22. | 23 October 2019 | Hồ Chí Minh City, Vietnam | Malaysia | 4–2 | 4–2 | 2019 AFF Futsal Championship |
| 23. | 27 October 2019 | Hồ Chí Minh City, Vietnam | Myanmar | 5–3 | 8–3 | 2019 AFF Futsal Championship |
| 24. | 11 December 2019 | Nakhon Ratchasima, Thailand | Guatemala | 2–? | 3–3 | Friendly |
| 25. | 17 May 2021 | Khor Fakkan, United Arab Emirates | Iraq | 1–1 | 2–1 | Friendly |
| 26. | 22 September 2021 | Vilnius, Lithuania | Russia | 2–3 | 2–3 | 2021 FIFA Futsal World Cup |
| 27. | 18 May 2022 | Phủ Lý, Vietnam | Myanmar | 1–0 | 4–0 | 2021 SEA Games |
| 28. | 15 September 2022 | Bangkok, Thailand | Mozambique | 1–1 | 3–1 | Friendly |
| 29. | 15 September 2022 | Bangkok, Thailand | Mozambique | 3–1 | 3–1 | Friendly |
| 30. | 30 September 2022 | Kuwait City, Kuwait | South Korea | 3–1 | 5–1 | 2022 AFC Futsal Asian Cup |
| 31. | 30 September 2022 | Kuwait City, Kuwait | South Korea | 5–1 | 5–1 | 2022 AFC Futsal Asian Cup |
| 32. | 4 October 2022 | Kuwait City, Kuwait | Iran | 1–8 | 1–8 | 2022 AFC Futsal Asian Cup |
| 33. | 6 June 2023 | Asunción, Paraguay | Paraguay | 2–4 | 4–4 | Friendly |
| 34. | 6 June 2023 | Asunción, Paraguay | Paraguay | 4–4 | 4–4 | Friendly |
| 35. | 19 September 2023 | Hồ Chí Minh City, Vietnam | Russia | 3–3 | 3–3 | Friendly |
| 36. | 7 October 2023 | Ulaanbaatar, Mongolia | Mongolia | 6–1 | 6–1 | 2024 AFC Futsal Asian Cup qualification |
| 37. | 30 March 2024 | Hồ Chí Minh City, Vietnam | Morocco | 2–1 | 3–3 | Friendly |
| 38. | 31 March 2024 | Hồ Chí Minh City, Vietnam | Iran | 1–3 | 1–3 | Friendly |
| 39. | 5 November 2024 | Nakhon Ratchasima, Thailand | Brunei | 6–0 | 14–0 | 2024 ASEAN Futsal Championship |
| 40. | 6 November 2024 | Nakhon Ratchasima, Thailand | Thailand | 1–1 | 3–2 | 2024 ASEAN Futsal Championship |
| 41. | 13 April 2025 | Hồ Chí Minh City, Vietnam | Kazakhstan | 2–1 | 4–1 | Friendly |
| 42. | 20 September 2025 | Hangzhou, China | Hong Kong | 5–0 | 9–1 | 2026 AFC Futsal Asian Cup qualification |

== Honours ==
Thái Sơn Nam

- Vietnam Futsal League: 2016, 2017, 2018, 2019, 2020, 2021, 2023

Individual

- Vietnamese Futsal Golden Ball: 2023
