= Châu Đoàn Phát =

Vietnamese futsal player

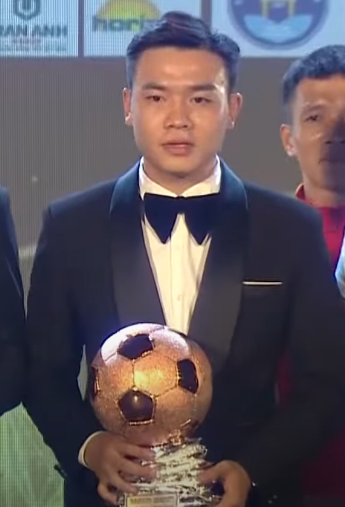
- Châu Đoàn Phát in 2022

Personal information
- Date of birth: 14 March 1999 (age 27)
- Place of birth: Cao Bằng, Vietnam
- Position: Midfielder

Team information
- Current team: Thái Sơn Nam HCMC
- Number: 19

Youth career
- 2011–2017: Thái Sơn Nam HCMC

Senior career*
Years	Team	Apps	(Gls)
2017–	Thái Sơn Nam HCMC		
2017–2018	→ Cao Bằng (loan)		

International career
2016–2019	Vietnam U20		
2016–	Vietnam		
- * Club domestic league appearances and goals

Châu Đoàn Phát (born 14 March 1999) is a futsal player who plays as an ala (midfielder) for Vietnam Futsal League team Thái Sơn Nam HCMC and the Vietnam national futsal team.

== Club career ==
Đoàn Phát is a youth product of Thái Sơn Nam. He was recruited to the club's youth academy in 2012 after displaying good performances during a youth futsal tournament in Cao Bằng.

In 2017, he was loaned to his hometown club Cao Bằng Futsal Club and made his debut in the Vietnam Futsal League. He remained for the club for one more season before being recalled to Thái Sơn Nam in 2019. He won four Vietnam Futsal League titles with the team in 2019, 2020, 2021 and 2023. He took part in the 2019 AFC Futsal Club Championship and helped the team finish in the third place.

== International career ==
In May 2021, in the deciding 2021 FIFA Futsal World Cup play off game against Lebanon, Đoàn Phát scored the goal that qualified Vietnam to the final tournament.

Later in the year, Đoàn Phát was named in Vietnam's 16-men squad for the 2021 FIFA Futsal World Cup. He scored 2 goals in the group stage, in the 3–2 win against Panama and in the 1–1 draw against Czech Republic, which helped Vietnam qualify to the round of 16 as one of the best third-placed teams. In the round of 16, Vietnam was defeated 2–3 by Russia. His performance in the tournament was deemed by the Vietnamese press as "heroic" and "brave" as his goals played a crucial role in helping Vietnam pass the World Cup group stage for the second time in history.

== Honours ==
Thái Sơn Nam

- Vietnam Futsal League: 2019, 2020, 2021, 2023, 2024

== International goals ==
List of international goals scored by Châu Đoàn Phát
No.	Date	Venue	Opponent	Score	Result	Competition
1.	23 June 2018	Changsha, China	China	2–0	4–0	Friendly
2.	5 November 2018	Yogyakarta, Indonesia	Brunei	7–0	9–0	2018 AFF Futsal Championship
3.	23 October 2019	Hồ Chí Minh City, Vietnam	Malaysia	4–2	4–2	2019 AFF Futsal Championship
4.	11 December 2019	Nakhon Ratchasima, Thailand	Guatemala	2–?	3–3	Friendly
5.	25 May 2021	Khor Fakkan, United Arab Emirates	Lebanon	1–0	1–1	2021 FIFA Futsal World Cup qualification
6.	16 September 2021	Klaipėda, Lithuania	Panama	2–0	3–2	2021 FIFA Futsal World Cup
7.	19 September 2021	Kaunas, Lithuania	Czech Republic	1–0	1–1	2021 FIFA Futsal World Cup
8.	6 April 2022	Bangkok, Thailand	Australia	4–1	5–1	2022 AFF Futsal Championship
9.	18 May 2022	Phủ Lý, Vietnam	Myanmar	4–0	4–0	2021 SEA Games
10.	15 September 2022	Bangkok, Thailand	Mozambique	2–1	3–1	Friendly
11.	30 September 2022	Kuwait City, Kuwait	Saudi Arabia	2–1	3–1	2022 AFC Futsal Asian Cup
12.	4 June 2023	Asunción, Paraguay	Paraguay	2–2	2–3	Friendly
13.	19 September 2023	Hồ Chí Minh City, Vietnam	Russia	2–3	3–3	Friendly
14.	9 October 2023	Ulaanbaatar, Mongolia	Nepal	1–0	5–0	2024 AFC Futsal Asian Cup qualification
15.	9 October 2023	Ulaanbaatar, Mongolia	Nepal	5–0	5–0	2024 AFC Futsal Asian Cup qualification
16.	5 November 2024	Nakhon Ratchasima, Thailand	Brunei	3–0	14–0	2024 ASEAN Futsal Championship
17.	13 April 2025	Hồ Chí Minh City, Vietnam	Kazakhstan	2–1	4–1	Friendly
18.	20 September 2025	Hangzhou, China	Hong Kong	1–0	9–1	2026 AFC Futsal Asian Cup qualification
19.	27 January 2026	Jakarta, Indonesia	Kuwait	1–2	5–4	2026 AFC Futsal Asian Cup
20.	12 April 2026	Nonthaburi, Thailand	Australia	2–0	4–0	2026 ASEAN Futsal Championship
21.	22 August 2026	Nonthaburi, Thailand	New Zealand	3–1	4–1	Friendly
22.	5 August 2026	Nonthaburi, Thailand	Thailand	1–3	3–3	Friendly
