= Hồ Văn Ý =

Vietnamese futsal player

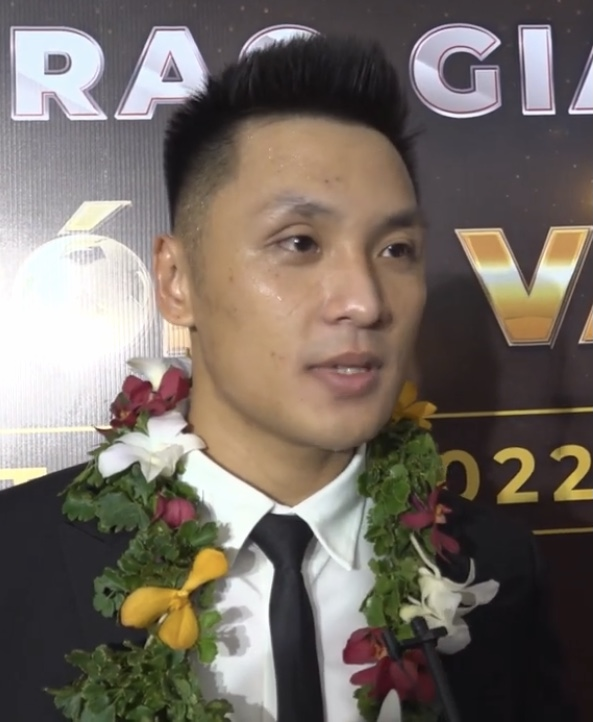
- Ý in 2022

Personal information
- Full name: Hồ Văn Ý
- Date of birth: January 1, 1997 (age 29)
- Place of birth: Điện Bàn, Quảng Nam, Vietnam
- Height: 1.83 m (6 ft 0 in)
- Position: Goalkeeper

Team information
- Current team: Thái Sơn Nam HCMC
- Number: 1

Senior career*
Years	Team	Apps	(Gls)
2015–2017	Đà Nẵng	38	(0)
2018–	Thái Sơn Nam HCMC	57	(2)

International career
2016–2017	Vietnam U20	4	(0)
2017–	Vietnam	44	(1)
- * Club domestic league appearances and goals

Hồ Văn Ý (born 1 January 1997) is a Vietnamese futsal player who plays as a goalkeeper for Thái Sơn Nam HCMC and Vietnam national futsal team.

== Playing career ==
On 1 January 1997, he was born in Quảng Nam, Vietnam. He played for Hoàng Thư Đà Nẵng from 2015 to 2017. After that, he has joined Thái Sơn Nam since 2018 and became the most important goalkeeper of club.

In 2018, he achieved success with Thái Sơn Nam by reaching to 2018 AFC Futsal Club Championship final. In this tournament, he scored a goal against Nagoya Oceans in the quarter-final to help Thái Sơn Nam beat them 3-2. Thanks to this performance, he was nominated 1 of 10 best goalkeepers of the World Futsal 2018

On April 13, 2025, he scored his first goal for the Vietnam national team, the goal to make it 3–1 in a 4–1 win over Kazakhstan.

== Honours ==
Thái Sơn Nam

- Vietnam Futsal League: 2018, 2019, 2020, 2021, 2023, 2024
- Vietnamese National Futsal Cup: 2018, 2020, 2023
- AFC Futsal Club Championship runner-up: 2018

Vietnam

- AFF Futsal Championship third place: 2019, 2022

Individual

- Vietnam Futsal Golden Ball: 2021, 2022
- Best Futsal Goalkeeper in the World nominee: 2018, 2021

== International goals ==
No.	Date	Venue	Opponent	Score	Result	Competition
1.	13 April 2025	Hồ Chí Minh City, Vietnam	Kazakhstan	3–1	4–1	Friendly
