= 2017 Vietnam National Futsal League =

Giải Futsal Vô địch Quốc gia 2017
- Season: 2017
- Champions: Thái Sơn Nam
- Matches: 110
- Goals: 558 (5.07 per match)

It was the eighth season of the Vietnam Futsal League, the Vietnam professional futsal league for association football clubs. This season is hold by VFF and VOV Channel. The main sponsorship of this season are HD Bank and Cityland.

== Teams changes ==
=== Former clubs ===
- V&V Quảng Nam
- BV An Phước Bình Thuận

=== New clubs ===
- Kim Toàn Đà Nẵng
- Sanest Tourist Khánh Hòa

== Rule changes ==
In this season, there are 2 stages. At the end of the First stage, 4 of 5 teams will be qualified to the Second stage, where we have 10 teams (6 automatic qualifications and 4 qualifications). The champion will be qualified to AFC Futsal Club Championship, while the runner-up will be qualified to AFF Futsal Club Championship.

== First stage ==
All matches are held in Quân Khu 5 Arena, Đà Nẵng from 17 February 2017 to 31 February 2017.

=== League table ===
Pos	Team	Pld	W	D	L	GF	GA	GD	Pts	Promotion or relegation
1	HPN Phú Nhuận	8	6	1	1	25	10	+15	19	Qualification to Second stage
2	Sài Gòn	8	4	2	2	21	15	+6	14	Qualification to Second stage
3	Hoàng Thư Đà Nẵng	8	3	3	2	24	18	+6	12	Qualification to Second stage
4	Sanest Tourist Khánh Hòa	8	2	2	4	13	20	−7	8	Qualification to Second stage
5	Kim Toàn Đà Nẵng	8	0	2	6	8	28	−20	2	

Updated to match(es) played on 31 March 2017. Source:
Rules for classification: 1) Points; 2) Goal difference; 3) Goals scored; 4) Head-to-head points; 5) Head-to-head goal difference; 6) Head-to-head goal scored

=== Results ===
Home \ Away	HPN	SGN	HTDN	STKH	KTDN
HPN Phu Nhuan Futsal Club		2–1	5–2	0–2	5–1
Sài Gòn Futsal Club	1–3		3–3	4–2	5–2
Hoàng Thư Đà Nẵng Futsal Club	1–1	2–2		3–4	6–0
Sanest Tourist Khánh Hòa Futsal Club	1–5	1–2	1–4		1–1
Kim Toàn Đà Nẵng Futsal Club	1–4	0–3	2–3	1–1	

Updated to match(es) played on 31 March 2017. Source:
Legend: Blue = home team win; Yellow = draw; Red = away team win.

== Second stage ==
All matches are held in Quân Khu 7 Arena, Hồ Chí Minh City from 8 April to 24 June 2017.

=== League table ===
Pos	Team	Pld	W	D	L	GF	GA	GD	Pts	Promotion or relegation
1	Thái Sơn Nam	18	14	3	1	82	31	+51	45	Qualification to 2018 AFC Futsal Club Championship
2	Sanatech Khánh Hòa	18	11	6	1	65	38	+27	39	Qualification to 2018 AFF Futsal Club Championship
3	HPN Phú Nhuận	18	12	1	5	54	38	+16	37	
4	Sanna Khánh Hòa	18	9	2	7	49	42	+7	29	
5	Sài Gòn	18	7	4	7	38	41	−3	25	
6	Thái Sơn Bắc	18	6	6	6	47	51	−4	24	
7	Cao Bằng	18	5	4	9	31	45	−14	19	Relegation to First Stage of 2018 Vietnam National Futsal League
8	Tân Hiệp Hưng	18	4	3	11	38	53	−15	15	Relegation to First Stage of 2018 Vietnam National Futsal League
9	Hoàng Thư Đà Nẵng	18	4	2	12	31	54	−23	14	Relegation to First Stage of 2018 Vietnam National Futsal League
10	Sanest Tourist Khánh Hòa	18	2	1	15	32	74	−42	7	Relegation to First Stage of 2018 Vietnam National Futsal League

Updated to match(es) played on 24 June 2017. Source:
Rules for classification: 1) Points; 2) Goal difference; 3) Goals scored; 4) Head-to-head points; 5) Head-to-head goal difference; 6) Head-to-head goal scored

=== Results ===
Home \ Away	HTDN	TSN	TSB	SKH	STKH	SNT	HPN	SGN	THH	CBG
Hoàng Thư Đà Nẵng Futsal Club		2–8	5–2	1–0	2–5	2–2	2–4	1–3	1–3	2–2
Thai Son Nam Futsal Club	6–0		4–4	2–1	4–1	1–1	7–2	4–1	3–0	4–0
Thái Sơn Bắc Futsal Club	4–3	3–6		2–4	3–5	3–3	1–3	2–4	8–6	2–2
Sanna Khanh Hoa Futsal Club	5–3	3–9	1–1		4–1	3–5	2–3	2–0	2–1	6–2
Sanest Tourist Khánh Hòa Futsal Club	1–3	2–7	1–4	1–4		1–7	2–6	1–5	2–2	0–2
Sanatech Khánh Hòa Futsal Club	2–1	5–3	1–2	3–2	6–4		3–3	6–2	5–2	1–1
HPN Phu Nhuan Futsal Club	2–0	1–3	0–2	3–2	4–0	1–4		5–0	2–3	5–3
Sài Gòn Futsal Club	2–0	0–3	2–2	2–2	4–1	2–2	3–4		2–1	3–1
Tân Hiệp Hưng Futsal Club	1–2	3–3	0–1	1–3	5–4	3–5	1–5	1–1		3–1
Cao Bằng Futsal Club	2–1	2–5	1–1	2–3	2–0	2–4	0–1	3–2	3–2	

Updated to match(es) played on 24 June 2017. Source: VFF
Legend: Blue = home team win; Yellow = draw; Red = away team win.

== Season awards ==
- Champion : Thái Sơn Nam (200,000,000 VND)
- Runner-up : Sanatech Khánh Hòa (100,000,000 VND)
- Third place : HPN Phú Nhuận (60,000,000 VND)
- Fair-play award : HPN Phú Nhuận (30,000,000 VND)
- Best player : Phạm Đức Hòa (Thái Sơn Nam) (10,000,000 VND)
- Best goalkeeper : Nguyễn Hoàng Anh (Sanatech Khánh Hòa) (10,000,000 VND)
- Top scorer : Mai Thành Đạt (Sanna Khánh Hòa, 15 goals) (10,000,000 VND)
