= Nguyễn Thịnh Phát =

Vietnamese futsal player

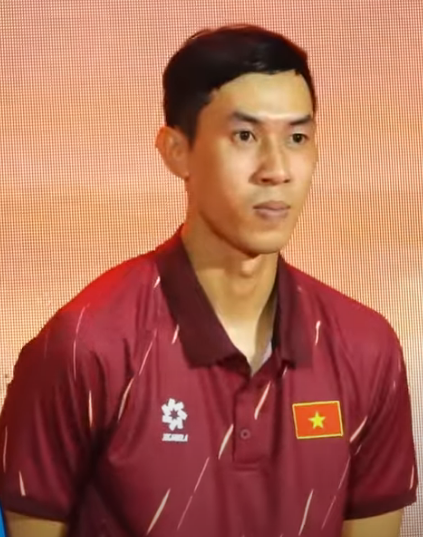
- Thịnh Phát in 2025

Personal information
- Date of birth: 10 June 1997 (age 29)
- Place of birth: Xuân Lộc, Đồng Nai, Vietnam
- Height: 1.82 m (6 ft 0 in)
- Position: Pivot

Team information
- Current team: Thái Sơn Nam HCMC
- Number: 20

Senior career*
Years	Team	Apps	(Gls)
2016–2017	Tân Hiệp Hưng		
2018	Cao Bằng		
2019	Sahako		
2020–	Thái Sơn Nam HCMC		
2021	→ Sahako (loan)		

International career
2022–	Vietnam		
- * Club domestic league appearances and goals

Nguyễn Thịnh Phát (born 10 June 1997) is a Vietnamese futsal player who plays as a pivot for Thái Sơn Nam HCMC and the Vietnam national team. He won the Vietnamese Golden Ball for futsal players in 2025.

== Club career ==
Thịnh Phát began his career as an amateur player at his hometown Đồng Nai. In 2016, he went on trial with Tân Hiệp Hưng and was admitted by the team. He then moved to Cao Bằng and then Sahako, before getting signed by Vietnamese futsal giants Thái Sơn Nam in 2020. In his first season at the club, he netted 18 goals, being one of the best goalscorers at the Vietnam Futsal League.

== International career ==
Thịnh Phát made his debut for Vietnam at the 2022 AFF Futsal Championship, scoring 5 goals as Vietnam finished third place.

Two years later, in 2024, Thịnh Phát featured in Vietnam's squad for the Asian Cup, and then at the ASEAN Championship, where he scored 5 goals again and lead Vietnam to the final. His performances during the year lead him to win the Vietnamese Futsal Golden Ball.

== Honours ==
Thái Sơn Nam

- Vietnam Futsal League: 2020, 2023, 2024

Individual

- Vietnamese Futsal Golden Ball: 2024

== International goals ==
List of international goals scored by Nguyễn Thịnh Phát
No.	Date	Venue	Opponent	Score	Result	Competition
1.	5 April 2022	Bangkok, Thailand	Timor-Leste	1–0	7–1	2022 AFF Futsal Championship
2.	5 April 2022	Bangkok, Thailand	Timor-Leste	3–1	7–1	2022 AFF Futsal Championship
3.	6 April 2022	Bangkok, Thailand	Australia	1–0	5–1	2022 AFF Futsal Championship
4.	6 April 2022	Bangkok, Thailand	Australia	3–1	5–1	2022 AFF Futsal Championship
5.	10 April 2022	Bangkok, Thailand	Myanmar	1–0	1–1 (4–1 p)	2022 AFF Futsal Championship
6.	14 May 2022	Phủ Lý, Vietnam	Malaysia	2–1	7–1	2021 SEA Games
7.	14 May 2022	Phủ Lý, Vietnam	Malaysia	3–1	7–1	2021 SEA Games
8.	13 September 2022	Bangkok, Thailand	Iran	1–1	1–3	Friendly
9.	25 May 2023	Hồ Chí Minh City, Vietnam	Solomon Islands	3–0	5–0	Friendly
10.	26 May 2023	Hồ Chí Minh City, Vietnam	Solomon Islands	2–0	5–0	Friendly
11.	7 October 2023	Ulaanbaatar, Mongolia	Mongolia	1–0	6–1	2024 AFC Futsal Asian Cup qualification
12.	7 October 2023	Ulaanbaatar, Mongolia	Mongolia	4–1	6–1	2024 AFC Futsal Asian Cup qualification
13.	24 April 2024	Bangkok, Thailand	Uzbekistan	1–0	1–2	2024 AFC Futsal Asian Cup
14.	29 October 2024	Bangkok, Thailand	Australia	?–?	5–3	Friendly
15.	2 November 2024	Nakhon Ratchasima, Thailand	Timor-Leste	3–1	4–1	2024 AFF Futsal Championship
16.	2 November 2024	Nakhon Ratchasima, Thailand	Timor-Leste	4–1	4–1	2024 AFF Futsal Championship
17.	4 November 2024	Nakhon Ratchasima, Thailand	Malaysia	2–0	2–0	2024 AFF Futsal Championship
18.	5 November 2024	Nakhon Ratchasima, Thailand	Brunei	8–0	14–0	2024 AFF Futsal Championship
19.	8 November 2024	Nakhon Ratchasima, Thailand	Australia	4–3	5–4 (a.e.t.)	2024 AFF Futsal Championship
20.	8 November 2024	Nakhon Ratchasima, Thailand	Australia	5–4	5–4 (a.e.t.)	2024 AFF Futsal Championship
21.	8 April 2025	Hồ Chí Minh City, Vietnam	Saudi Arabia	1–0	2–1	Friendly
22.	11 September 2025	Kuwait City, Kuwait	Kuwait	?–?	3–2	Friendly
23.	20 September 2025	Hangzhou, China	Hong Kong	2–0	9–1	2026 AFC Futsal Asian Cup qualification
24.	22 September 2025	Hangzhou, China	China	5–0	7–2	2026 AFC Futsal Asian Cup qualification
25.	22 September 2025	Hangzhou, China	China	6–0	7–2	2026 AFC Futsal Asian Cup qualification
26.	22 September 2025	Hangzhou, China	China	7–0	7–2	2026 AFC Futsal Asian Cup qualification
27.	27 January 2026	Jakarta, Indonesia	Kuwait	2–2	5–4	2026 AFC Futsal Asian Cup
28.	7 April 2026	Nonthaburi, Thailand	Timor-Leste	2–0	7–1	2026 ASEAN Futsal Championship
29.	12 April 2026	Nonthaburi, Thailand	Australia	3–0	4–0	2026 ASEAN Futsal Championship
30.	1 August 2026	Nonthaburi, Thailand	Russia	1–1	2–2	Friendly
31.	2 August 2026	Nonthaburi, Thailand	New Zealand	3–1	4–1	Friendly
32.	3 August 2026	Nonthaburi, Thailand	Afghanistan	1–0	2–1	Friendly
33.	6 November 2026	Bishkek, Kyrgyzstan	Kyrgyzstan	1–0	2–2	Friendly
34.	10 November 2026	Nizhny Novgorod, Russia	Russia	3–2	3–3	Friendly
