= Alireza Rafieipour =

Iranian futsal player

Personal information
- Full name: Alireza Rafieipour
- Date of birth: 9 October 1993 (age 33)
- Place of birth: Behbahan, Iran
- Height: 1.82 m (6 ft 0 in)
- Position: Defender

Team information
- Current team: Crop
- Number: 4

Senior career*
Years	Team	Apps	(Gls)
2012–2019	Melli Haffari		(44)
2019	Naft Al Wasat		
2019	Thái Sơn Nam		
2019–2020	SKN Kebumen		
2021–	Crop		(11)

International career^{‡}
2014–2015	Iran U23		
2017–	Iran		(7)
Medal record
Representing Iran
Men's Futsal as player
AFC Futsal Championship
Gold medal – first place	2018 Chinese Taipei
Silver medal – second place	2022 Kuwait
- * Club domestic league appearances and goals as of 8 July 2023 ‡ National team caps and goals as of 19 September 2022

Alireza Rafieipour (Persian: علیرضا رفیعی پور; born 9 October 1993) is an Iranian professional futsal player. He is currently a member of Crop in the Iranian Futsal Super League.

== Honours ==
=== International ===
- AFC Futsal Championship
  - Champion (1): 2018
  - Runner-up (1): 2022
