= Phạm Minh Giang =

Vietnamese futsal manager

Personal information
- Full name: Phạm Minh Giang
- Date of birth: 27 November 1981 (age 44)
- Place of birth: Bình Thuận, Vietnam
- Height: 1.75 m (5 ft 9 in)

Senior career*
Years	Team	Apps	(Gls)
–2014	Thái Sơn Nam	?	(?)

International career
2006–2011	Vietnam		

Managerial career
- 2014–2019: Tân Hiệp Hưng
- 2019–2022: Thái Sơn Nam
- 2019–2020: Vietnam (interim)
- 2020–2022: Vietnam
- 2023–2024: Cao Bằng
- 2024–: TD Soccer
- * Club domestic league appearances and goals

Phạm Minh Giang (born 27 November 1981) is a former futsal player and is currently the head coach of Canadian club TD Soccer. Phạm Minh Giang is the first domestic coach to lead the Vietnam national futsal team to participate in a FIFA Futsal World Cup.

== Playing career ==
When he was still a player, Phạm Minh Giang played for Thái Sơn Nam club.

== Coaching career ==
After retiring, Giang continued to work in Thái Sơn Nam, where he coached the team's youth sector. In 2014, he was appointed as the head coach of Tân Hiệp Hưng, where he remained for 5 years. In 2019, he returned to Thái Sơn Nam, where he was named as the team's new head coach. At the same year, he served as Miguel Rodrigo's assistant in the Vietnam national futsal team.

In December 2019, after Rodrigo's departure, he was appointed as the interim coach of Vietnam futsal team. From January 2020 to present, he is the official coach. Phạm Minh Giang's first task was to lead the team in the Asian Cup 2020, but due to the COVID-19 pandemic, this tournament was canceled. An year after, he and his team overcame Lebanon futsal team to qualify for the 2021 FIFA Futsal World Cup.

Giang continued to be Vietnam's head coach at the 2021 World Cup. At the opening match of the tournament, Vietnam suffered from a huge defeat against title contender Brazil, but then defeated Panama 3–2 and draw Czech Republic 1–1 in the following games, gaining Vietnam the qualification to the knockout stage for the second time in their history. In the round of 16, Giang was unable to coach the team after being positive for COVID-19. Vietnam then lost tightly to Russia 2–3 and was eliminated and exit the tournament.

In 2024, Giang emigrated to Canada with his family and settled in Saskatoon. There, he was hired as the coach of TD Soccer.
