= 2022 AFC Futsal Asian Cup =

International futsal competition

كأس آسيا لكرة الصالات 2022

Tournament details
- Host country: Kuwait
- Dates: 27 September – 8 October
- Teams: 16 (from 1 confederation)
- Venue: 1 (in 1 host city)

Final positions
- Champions: Japan (4th title)
- Runners-up: Iran
- Third place: Uzbekistan
- Fourth place: Thailand

Tournament statistics
- Matches played: 32
- Goals scored: 193 (6.03 per match)
- Top scorer: (Iran) Hossein Tayyebi (10 goals)
- Best player: (Iran) Moslem Oladghobad
- Best goalkeeper: (Japan) Guilherme Kuromoto
- Fair play award: Uzbekistan

The 2022 AFC Futsal Asian Cup was the 16th edition of the AFC Futsal Asian Cup, the biennial international futsal championship organised by the Asian Football Confederation (AFC) for the men's national teams of Asia. A total of 16 teams compete in the tournament.

Kuwait was appointed as hosts of the 2020 AFC Futsal Championship, after replacing the original hosts Turkmenistan. However, AFC announced the cancellation of the tournament on 25 January 2021 due to the COVID-19 pandemic. The tournament was scheduled to be played in Kuwait from 16 to 27 February 2022. On 5 July 2021, the AFC announced that the tournament would be held between 27 September and 8 October 2022.

Japan defeated defending champions Iran in the final to claim their fourth title.

== Qualification ==
Qualifiers were originally scheduled to be played from 13 to 24 October 2021. However, on 5 July 2021, the AFC announced that it would be held from 1 to 15 April 2022.

=== Qualified teams ===
The following 16 teams qualified for the final tournament.

Team	Qualified as	Appearances	Last Appearance	Previous best performance
Kuwait	Hosts	12th	2014	Fourth place (2003, 2014)
Lebanon	West Zone Group A winners	12th	2018	Quarter-finals (2004, 2007, 2008, 2010, 2012, 2014, 2018)
Saudi Arabia	West Zone Group A runners-up	2nd	2016	Group stage (2016)
Iraq	West Zone Group B winners	12th	2018	Fourth place (2018)
Bahrain	West Zone Group B runners-up	3rd	2018	Quarter-finals (2018)
Oman	West Zone playoff winner	1st	Debut	None
Thailand	ASEAN Zone winners	16th	2018	Runners-up (2008, 2012)
Indonesia	ASEAN Zone runners-up	10th	2014	Group stage (2002, 2003, 2004, 2005, 2006, 2008, 2010, 2012, 2014)
Vietnam	ASEAN Zone third place	6th	2018	Fourth place (2016)
Iran	Central and South Zone Group A winners	16th	2018	Champions (1999, 2000, 2001, 2002, 2003, 2004, 2005, 2007, 2008, 2010, 2016, 2018)
Turkmenistan	Central and South Zone Group A runners-up	7th	2012	Group stage (2005, 2006, 2007, 2008, 2010, 2012)
Uzbekistan	Central and South Zone Group B winners	16th	2018	Runners-up (2001, 2006, 2010, 2016)
Tajikistan	Central and South Zone Group B runners-up	11th	2018	Quarter-finals (2007)
Japan	East Zone winners	16th	2018	Champions (2006, 2012, 2014)
South Korea	East Zone runner-up	14th	2018	Runners-up (1999)
Chinese Taipei	East Zone third place	13th	2018	Quarter-finals (2003)

^{1} Italic indicates hosts for that year.

== Venues ==
Kuwait City
Saad Al Abdullah Hall
Capacity: 6,000

== Draw ==
The draw was held on 26 May 2022 in Kuala Lumpur, Malaysia.

Pot 1	Pot 2	Pot 3	Pot 4
1. Kuwait (hosts); 2. Iran; 3. Japan; 4. Uzbekistan	5. Iraq; 6. Lebanon; 7. Vietnam; 8. Bahrain	9. Thailand; 10. Chinese Taipei; 11. Tajikistan; 12. South Korea	13. Indonesia; 14. Turkmenistan; 15. Saudi Arabia; 16. Oman

== Squads ==
Each team had to submit a squad of 14 players, including a minimum of two goalkeepers.

== Group stage ==
The top two teams of each group advance to the quarter-finals.

Tiebreakers

Teams are ranked according to points (3 points for a win, 1 point for a draw, 0 points for a loss), and if tied on points, the following tiebreaking criteria are applied, in the order given, to determine the rankings (Regulations Article 11.5):

1. Points in head-to-head matches among tied teams;
2. Goal difference in head-to-head matches among tied teams;
3. Goals scored in head-to-head matches among tied teams;
4. If more than two teams are tied, and after applying all head-to-head criteria above, a subset of teams are still tied, all head-to-head criteria above are reapplied exclusively to this subset of teams;
5. Goal difference in all group matches;
6. Goals scored in all group matches;
7. Penalty shoot-out if only two teams are tied and they met in the last round of the group;
8. Disciplinary points (yellow card = 1 point, red card as a result of two yellow cards = 3 points, direct red card = 3 points, yellow card followed by direct red card = 4 points);
9. Drawing of lots.

All times are local, AST (UTC+3).

Schedule
Matchday	Matches
Matchday 1	1 v 4, 2 v 3
Matchday 2	4 v 2, 3 v 1
Matchday 3	1 v 2, 3 v 4

=== Group A ===
Pos	Team	Pld	W	D	L	GF	GA	GD	Pts	Qualification
1	Thailand	3	2	1	0	11	5	+6	7	Knockout stage
2	Kuwait (H)	3	1	2	0	11	6	+5	5	Knockout stage
3	Iraq	3	1	1	1	9	5	+4	4	
4	Oman	3	0	0	3	3	18	−15	0	

Source: AFC
Rules for classification: Group stage tiebreakers
(H) Hosts
27 September 2022
17:00

Iraq	2–3	Thailand
Zeyad 8'; Ihsan 14'	Report	Worasak 17'; Sarawut 25'; Jetsada 36'

Saad Al Abdullah Hall, Kuwait City
Referee: Hiroyuki Kobayashi (Japan)
27 September 2022
20:00

Kuwait	7–2	Oman
Al-Tawail 6', 23'; Al-Abbasi 8', 30'; Al-Basam 23'; Al-Khalifah 30'; Al-Fadhel 33'	Report	S. Al-Balushi 31'; Al-Maawali 38'

Saad Al Abdullah Hall, Kuwait City
Referee: Ebrahim Mehrabi Afshar (Iran)

29 September 2022
17:00

Oman	0–5	Iraq
	Report	Abdulhadi 4'; Faisal 4', 32', 35'; Riyadh 14'

Saad Al Abdullah Hall, Kuwait City
Referee: Mohamad Chami (Lebanon)
29 September 2022
20:00

Thailand	2–2	Kuwait
Sarawut 6'; Krit 35'	Report	Al-Fadhel 18'; Al-Basam 27'

Saad Al Abdullah Hall, Kuwait City
Referee: Husain Ali Al-Bahhar (Bahrain)

1 October 2022
17:00

Thailand	6–1	Oman
Warut 4'; Jetsada 16'; Worasak 18'; Sarawut 19'; Narongsak 32', 37'	Report	Taqi 34'

Saad Al Abdullah Hall, Kuwait City
Referee: Ebrahim Mehrabi Afshar (Iran)
1 October 2022
20:00

Kuwait	2–2	Iraq
Al-Wadi 2'; Al-Mosabehi 21'	Report	Faisal 13', 18'

Saad Al Abdullah Hall, Kuwait City
Referee: Ryan Shepheard (Australia)

=== Group B ===
Pos	Team	Pld	W	D	L	GF	GA	GD	Pts	Qualification
1	Uzbekistan	3	3	0	0	17	3	+14	9	Knockout stage
2	Tajikistan	3	2	0	1	14	11	+3	6	Knockout stage
3	Bahrain	3	0	1	2	8	14	−6	1	
4	Turkmenistan	3	0	1	2	9	20	−11	1	

Source: AFC
Rules for classification: Group stage tiebreakers
27 September 2022
11:00

Uzbekistan	8–0	Turkmenistan
Choriev 6'; Adilov 13', 22'; Ropiev 15', 33'; D. Rakhmatov 30'; Fakhriddinov 34'; Usmonov 40'	Report

Saad Al Abdullah Hall, Kuwait City
Referee: Fahad Al-Hosani (United Arab Emirates)
27 September 2022
14:00

Bahrain	3–4	Tajikistan
Mayhad 12'; Antar 34'; Saleh 39'	Report	Kuziev 8'; Soliev 23'; Sardorov 24'; Yorov 39'

Saad Al Abdullah Hall, Kuwait City
Referee: Lee Po-fu (Chinese Taipei)

29 September 2022
11:00

Turkmenistan	4–4	Bahrain
Sähedow 13', 14', 19', 26' (pen.)	Report	Antar 10'; M. Abdulla 13'; Abbas 26' (pen.); Al-Sandi 40'

Saad Al Abdullah Hall, Kuwait City
Referee: Hawkar Salar Ahmed (Iraq)
29 September 2022
14:00

Tajikistan	2–3	Uzbekistan
Sardorov 4', 38'	Report	Tulkinov 3'; Nishonov 7'; A. Rakhmatov 19'

Saad Al Abdullah Hall, Kuwait City
Referee: Gelareh Nazemi Deylami (Iran)

1 October 2022
11:00

Tajikistan	8–5	Turkmenistan
Yorov 8', 9', 22', 38'; Sharipov 11'; Baýramdurdyýew 19' (o.g.); Sardorov 37', 40'	Report	Soltanow 3'; Sähedow 20', 40'; Annagulyýew 35', 37'

Saad Al Abdullah Hall, Kuwait City
Referee: Mohamad Chami (Lebanon)
1 October 2022
14:00

Uzbekistan	6–1	Bahrain
Tulkinov 6'; Usmonov 20', 30'; Adilov 22'; Fakhriddinov 26'; Nishonov 27'	Report	Mayhad 35'

Saad Al Abdullah Hall, Kuwait City
Referee: Eisa Abdulhoussain (Kuwait)

=== Group C ===
Pos	Team	Pld	W	D	L	GF	GA	GD	Pts	Qualification
1	Iran	3	3	0	0	24	1	+23	9	Knockout stage
2	Indonesia	3	2	0	1	11	8	+3	6	Knockout stage
3	Chinese Taipei	3	0	1	2	3	15	−12	1	
4	Lebanon	3	0	1	2	3	17	−14	1	

Source: AFC
Rules for classification: Group stage tiebreakers
28 September 2022
17:00

Iran	5–0	Indonesia
Ahmadabbasi 2', 22'; Oladghobad 2'; Asadshir 9'; Tayyebi 24'	Report

Saad Al Abdullah Hall, Kuwait City
Referee: Ryan Shepheard (Australia)
28 September 2022
20:00

Lebanon	1–1	Chinese Taipei
Hammoud 18'	Report	Huang Wei-lun 13'

Saad Al Abdullah Hall, Kuwait City
Referee: Andrew Best (Australia)

30 September 2022
17:00

Indonesia	7–2	Lebanon
Pangestu 3'; Fajriyan 7'; Firman 19'; Iqbal 21'; Dewa 27'; Reza 37'; Syauqi 40'	Report	Zeitoun 25'; Koukezian 37'

Saad Al Abdullah Hall, Kuwait City
Referee: Trương Quốc Dũng (Vietnam)
30 September 2022
20:00

Chinese Taipei	1–10	Iran
He Chia-chen 31'	Report	Bazyar 2'; Tayyebi 3', 16', 36'; Ahmadabbasi 4', 16', 18'; Aghapour 22'; Javan 28'; Karimi 35'

Saad Al Abdullah Hall, Kuwait City
Referee: Helday Idang (Malaysia)

2 October 2022
17:00

Chinese Taipei	1–4	Indonesia
Lin Chih-hung 30'	Report	Fajriyan 10', 12', 12'; Syauqi 29'

Saad Al Abdullah Hall, Kuwait City
Referee: Husain Ali Al-Bahhar (Bahrain)
2 October 2022
20:00

Iran	9–0	Lebanon
Aghapour 8', 32'; Tayyebi 17', 39'; Rhyem 17' (o.g.); Oladghobad 19'; Jafari 21'; Karimi 28'; Bazyar 27'	Report

Saad Al Abdullah Hall, Kuwait City
Referee: Abdulrahman Al-Doseri (Bahrain)

=== Group D ===
Pos	Team	Pld	W	D	L	GF	GA	GD	Pts	Qualification
1	Japan	3	2	0	1	9	2	+7	6 (Note: Tied on head-to-head-points (3). Head-to-head goal difference: Japan +1, Vietnam 0, Saudi Arabia −1.)	Knockout stage
2	Vietnam	3	2	0	1	8	4	+4	6	Knockout stage
3	Saudi Arabia	3	2	0	1	7	4	+3	6	
4	South Korea	3	0	0	3	1	15	−14	0	

Source: AFC
Rules for classification: Group stage tiebreakers
Notes:
28 September 2022
11:00

Japan	1–2	Saudi Arabia
Crepaldi 3'	Report	Al-Harthi 11'; Fqihe 15'

Saad Al Abdullah Hall, Kuwait City
Referee: Anatoliy Rubakov (Uzbekistan)
28 September 2022
14:00

Vietnam	5–1	South Korea
Shin Jong-hoon 2' (o.g.); Trần Thái Huy 15', 34'; Phạm Đức Hòa 17', 35'	Report	Shin Jong-hoon 1'

Saad Al Abdullah Hall, Kuwait City
Referee: Benjapol Mucharoensap (Thailand)

30 September 2022
11:00

South Korea	0–6	Japan
	Report	Seo Jung-woo 5' (o.g.); Oliveira 6'; Mizutani 17'; Ishida 27'; Kanazawa 28'; Yoshikawa 39'

Saad Al Abdullah Hall, Kuwait City
Referee: Zari Fathi (Iran)
30 September 2022
14:00

Saudi Arabia	1–3	Vietnam
Châu Đoàn Phát 30' (o.g.)	Report	Nguyễn Anh Duy 12'; Châu Đoàn Phát 29'; Nguyễn Minh Trí 40'

Saad Al Abdullah Hall, Kuwait City
Referee: Osama Idrees Sedaif (Bahrain)

2 October 2022
11:00

South Korea	0–4	Saudi Arabia
	Report	Ali 4', 23'; Rudayni 12', 39'

Saad Al Abdullah Hall, Kuwait City
Referee: Leung Chung Yin (Hong Kong)
2 October 2022
14:00

Japan	2–0	Vietnam
Shimizu 6', 36'	Report

Saad Al Abdullah Hall, Kuwait City
Referee: Pornnarong Grairod (Thailand)

== Knockout stage ==
In the knockout stage, extra time and penalty shoot-out are used to decide the winner if necessary, except for the third place match where penalty shoot-out (no extra time) is used to decide the winner if necessary (Regulations Article 15.1).

=== Bracket ===
Quarter-finals
4 October – Saad Al Abdullah Hall
Thailand	3
Tajikistan	2
4 October – Saad Al Abdullah Hall
Iran	8
Vietnam	1
4 October – Saad Al Abdullah Hall
Uzbekistan	3
Kuwait	0
4 October – Saad Al Abdullah Hall
Japan	3
Indonesia	2

Semi-finals
6 October – Saad Al Abdullah Hall
Thailand	0
Iran	5
6 October – Saad Al Abdullah Hall
Uzbekistan	1
Japan	2

Final
8 October – Saad Al Abdullah Hall
Iran	2
Japan	3
Third place
8 October – Saad Al Abdullah Hall
Thailand	2
Uzbekistan	8

=== Quarter-finals ===
4 October 2022
11:00

Iran	8–1	Vietnam
Aghapour 9'; Rafieipour 9'; Tayyebi 15', 32', 33'; Bazyar 24'; Oladghobad 27'; Ahmadabbasi 37'	Report	Phạm Đức Hòa 37'

Saad Al Abdullah Hall, Kuwait City
Referee: Hiroyuki Kobayashi (Japan)

4 October 2022
14:00

Japan	3–2	Indonesia
Kanazawa 32'; Pires 38'; Mizutani 39'	Report	Eko 21'; Dewa 40'

Saad Al Abdullah Hall, Kuwait City
Referee: Trương Quốc Dũng (Vietnam)

4 October 2022
17:00

Thailand	3–2	Tajikistan
Panat 2'; Jetsada 35'; Worasak 40'	Report	Vositzoda 28'; Yorov 34'

Saad Al Abdullah Hall, Kuwait City
Referee: Ryan Shepheard (Australia)

4 October 2022
20:00

Uzbekistan	3–0	Kuwait
A. Rakhmatov 14'; Choriev 21'; Nishonov 34'	Report

Saad Al Abdullah Hall, Kuwait City
Referee: Ebrahim Mehrabi Afshar (Iran)

=== Semi-finals ===
6 October 2022
17:00

Uzbekistan	1–2	Japan
Khamroev 17'	Report	Oliveira 23'; Kanazawa 30'

Saad Al Abdullah Hall, Kuwait City
Referee: Husain Ali Al-Bahhar (Bahrain)

6 October 2022
20:00

Thailand	0–5	Iran
	Report	Tayyebi 1'; Derakhshani 22', 28'; Oladghobad 24', 27'

Saad Al Abdullah Hall, Kuwait City
Referee: Fahad Al-Hosani (United Arab Emirates)

=== Third place match ===
8 October 2022
17:00

Thailand	2–8	Uzbekistan
Wingwon 2'; Worasak 27'	Report	Ropiev 2', 26'; Choriev 7'; Tulkinov 14'; Nishonov 16'; Juraev 22'; A. Rakhmatov 23'; Khamroev 31'

Saad Al Abdullah Hall, Kuwait City
Referee: Ebrahim Mehrabi Afshar (Iran)

=== Final ===
8 October 2022
20:00

Iran	2–3	Japan
Ahmadabbasi 15'; Javan 40'	Report	Shimizu 16'; Oliveira 27'; Ahmadabbasi 40' (o.g.)

Saad Al Abdullah Hall, Kuwait City
Referee: Ryan Shepheard (Australia)

== Awards ==
The following awards were given at the conclusion of the tournament:

Top Goalscorer	Best Goalkeeper	Most Valuable Player	Fair Play Award
(Iran) Hossein Tayyebi	(Japan) Guilherme Kuromoto	(Iran) Moslem Oladghobad	Uzbekistan

== Goalscorers ==
There were 193 goals scored in 32 matches, for an average of 6.03 goals per match.

10 goals

- (Iran) Hossein Tayyebi

7 goals

- (Iran) Saeid Ahmadabbasi

6 goals

- (Tajikistan) Idris Yorov
- (Turkmenistan) Gurbangeldi Sähedow

5 goals

- (Iran) Moslem Oladghobad
- (Iraq) Salim Faisal
- (Tajikistan) Fayzali Sardorov

4 goals

- (Indonesia) Muhammad Fajriyan
- (Iran) Salar Aghapour
- (Thailand) Worasak Srirangpirot
- (Uzbekistan) Khusniddin Nishonov
- (Uzbekistan) Ikhtiyor Ropiev

3 goals

- (Iran) Mohammad Hossein Bazyar
- (Japan) Sora Kanazawa
- (Japan) Arthur Oliveira
- (Japan) Kazuya Shimizu
- (Thailand) Jetsada Chudech
- (Thailand) Sarawut Phalaphruek
- (Uzbekistan) Mashrab Adilov
- (Uzbekistan) Davron Choriev
- (Uzbekistan) Anaskhon Rakhmatov
- (Uzbekistan) Elbek Tulkinov
- (Uzbekistan) Akbar Usmonov
- (Vietnam) Phạm Đức Hòa

2 goals

- (Bahrain) Ahmed Antar
- (Bahrain) Ammar Hasan Mayhad
- (Indonesia) Dewa Rizki
- (Indonesia) Syauqi Saud
- (Iran) Mohammad Hossein Derakhshani
- (Iran) Alireza Javan
- (Iran) Mehdi Karimi
- (Japan) Soma Mizutani
- (Kuwait) Abdullatif Al-Abbasi
- (Kuwait) Abdulaziz Al-Basam
- (Kuwait) Saleh Al-Fadhel
- (Kuwait) Abdulrahman Al-Tawail
- (Saudi Arabia) Farhan Ali
- (Saudi Arabia) Fahad Rudayni
- (Thailand) Narongsak Wingwon
- (Turkmenistan) Mülkaman Annagulyýew
- (Uzbekistan) Shakhram Fakhriddinov
- (Uzbekistan) Ilkhomjon Khamroev
- (Vietnam) Trần Thái Huy

1 goal

- (Bahrain) Mohamed Abdulla
- (Bahrain) Jassam Saleh
- (Bahrain) Mohamed Al-Sandi
- (Bahrain) Falah Abbas
- (Chinese Taipei) He Chia-chen
- (Chinese Taipei) Huang Wei-lun
- (Chinese Taipei) Lin Chih-hung
- (Indonesia) Samuel Eko
- (Indonesia) Firman Adriansyah
- (Indonesia) Iqbal Rahmatullah
- (Indonesia) Rio Pangestu
- (Indonesia) Reza Gunawan
- (Iran) Mehdi Asadshir
- (Iran) Bahman Jafari
- (Iran) Alireza Rafieipour
- (Iraq) Mohanad Abdulhadi
- (Iraq) Mustafa Ihsan
- (Iraq) Ghaith Riyadh
- (Iraq) Tareq Zeyad
- (Japan) Vinícius Crepaldi
- (Japan) Kentaro Ishida
- (Japan) Higor Pires
- (Japan) Tomoki Yoshikawa
- (Kuwait) Yousef Al-Khalifah
- (Kuwait) Abdulrahman Al-Mosabehi
- (Kuwait) Abdulrahman Al-Wadi
- (Lebanon) Mouhammad Hammoud
- (Lebanon) Steve Koukezian
- (Lebanon) Hasan Zeitoun
- (Oman) Samer Al-Balushi
- (Oman) Khalfan Al-Maawali
- (Oman) Mohammed Taqi
- (Saudi Arabia) Mohsen Fqihe
- (Saudi Arabia) Nasser Al-Harthi
- (South Korea) Shin Jong-hoon
- (Tajikistan) Umed Kuziev
- (Tajikistan) Muhamadjon Sharipov
- (Tajikistan) Bakhtiyor Soliev
- (Tajikistan) Iqboli Vositzoda
- (Thailand) Krit Aransanyalak
- (Thailand) Panat Kittipanuwong
- (Thailand) Warut Wangsama-aeo
- (Thailand) Narongsak Wingwon
- (Turkmenistan) Maksat Soltanow
- (Uzbekistan) Sunatulla Juraev
- (Uzbekistan) Dilshod Rakhmatov
- (Vietnam) Châu Đoàn Phát
- (Vietnam) Nguyễn Anh Duy
- (Vietnam) Nguyễn Minh Trí

1 own goal

- (Iran) Saeid Ahmadabbasi (against Japan)
- (Lebanon) Mustafa Rhyem (against Iran)
- (South Korea) Seo Jung-woo (against Japan)
- (South Korea) Shin Jong-hoon (against Vietnam)
- (Turkmenistan) Şiri Baýramdurdyýew (against Tajikistan)
- (Vietnam) Châu Đoàn Phát (against Saudi Arabia)

== Final rankings ==
Pos	Team	Pld	W	D	L	GF	GA	GD	Pts	Final results
1	Japan	6	5	0	1	17	7	+10	15	Champions
2	Iran	6	5	0	1	39	5	+34	15	Runners-up
3	Uzbekistan	6	5	0	1	29	7	+22	15	Third place
4	Thailand	6	3	1	2	16	20	−4	10	Fourth place
5	Tajikistan	4	2	0	2	16	14	+2	6	Eliminated in quarter-finals
6	Indonesia	4	2	0	2	13	11	+2	6	Eliminated in quarter-finals
7	Vietnam	4	2	0	2	9	12	−3	6	Eliminated in quarter-finals
8	Kuwait	4	1	2	1	11	9	+2	5	Eliminated in quarter-finals
9	Saudi Arabia	3	2	0	1	7	4	+3	6	Third place in group stage
10	Iraq	3	1	1	1	9	5	+4	4	Third place in group stage
11	Bahrain	3	0	1	2	8	14	−6	1	Third place in group stage
12	Chinese Taipei	3	0	1	2	3	15	−12	1	Third place in group stage
13	Turkmenistan	3	0	1	2	9	20	−11	1	Fourth place in group stage
14	Lebanon	3	0	1	2	3	17	−14	1	Fourth place in group stage
15	South Korea	3	0	0	3	1	15	−14	0	Fourth place in group stage
16	Oman	3	0	0	3	3	18	−15	0	Fourth place in group stage

Source: AFC
