= 2018 Vietnam National Futsal League =

Giải Futsal Vô địch Quốc gia 2018
- Season: 2018
- Champions: Thái Sơn Nam

It was the ninth season of the Vietnam Futsal League, the Vietnam professional futsal league for association football clubs. This season is hold by VFF and VOV Channel. The main sponsorship of this season are HD Bank and Cityland.

== Teams changes ==
=== New clubs ===
- Vietfootball

=== Renamed clubs ===
- Sanatech Sanest Khánh Hòa

== Rule changes ==
In this season, there are 2 stages. At the end of the First stage, 4 of 6 teams will be qualified to the Second stage, where we have 10 teams (6 automatic qualifications and 4 qualifications). The champion will be qualified to AFC Futsal Club Championship, while the runner-up will be qualified to AFF Futsal Club Championship.

== First stage ==
All matches are held in Tiên Sơn Arena, Đà Nẵng from 1 May 2018 to 9 May 2018.

=== League table ===
Pos	Team	Pld	W	D	L	GF	GA	GD	Pts	Promotion or relegation
1	Cao Bằng	5	4	1	0	25	7	+18	13	Qualification to Second stage
2	Tân Hiệp Hưng	5	4	0	1	19	9	+10	12	Qualification to Second stage
3	Hoàng Thư Đà Nẵng	5	2	1	2	22	18	+4	7	Qualification to Second stage
4	Kim Toàn Đà Nẵng	5	2	1	2	9	9	0	7	Qualification to Second stage
5	Sanest Tourist Khánh Hòa	5	1	1	3	9	9	0	4	
6	Vietfootball	5	0	0	5	3	35	−32	0	

Updated to match(es) played on 9 May 2018. Source: VFF
Rules for classification: 1) Points; 2) Goal difference; 3) Goals scored; 4) Head-to-head points; 5) Head-to-head goal difference; 6) Head-to-head goal scored

== Second stage ==
Matches of the first leg are held in Tiên Sơn Arena, Đà Nẵng from 13 May to 3 June 2018. Matches of the second leg are held in Lãnh Bình Thăng Gymnasium, Hồ Chí Minh City from 7 September to 29 September 2018.

=== League table ===
Pos	Team	Pld	W	D	L	GF	GA	GD	Pts	Promotion or relegation
1	Thái Sơn Nam	18	14	2	2	65	23	+42	44	Qualification to 2019 AFC Futsal Club Championship
2	Sanatech Sanest Khánh Hòa	18	13	3	2	63	27	+36	42	Qualification to 2019 AFF Futsal Club Championship
3	HPN Phú Nhuận	18	12	3	3	57	28	+29	39	
4	Sài Gòn	18	10	2	6	41	36	+5	32	
5	Cao Bằng	18	9	4	5	52	34	+18	31	
6	Tân Hiệp Hưng	18	8	1	9	34	38	−4	25	
7	Thái Sơn Bắc	18	6	4	8	57	51	+6	22	Relegation to First Stage of 2019 Vietnam National Futsal League
8	Sanna Khánh Hòa	18	4	2	12	31	57	−26	14	Relegation to First Stage of 2019 Vietnam National Futsal League
9	Hoàng Thư Đà Nẵng	18	2	1	15	36	93	−57	7	Relegation to First Stage of 2019 Vietnam National Futsal League
10	Kim Toàn Đà Nẵng	18	1	0	17	25	74	−49	3	Relegation to First Stage of 2019 Vietnam National Futsal League

Updated to match(es) played on 16 May 2018. Source: VFF
Rules for classification: 1) Points; 2) Goal difference; 3) Goals scored; 4) Head-to-head points; 5) Head-to-head goal difference; 6) Head-to-head goal scored
