= Bahrain national futsal team =

Bahrain
- Nickname(s): Al-Ahmar (The Red)
- Association: Bahrain Football Association
- Confederation: AFC (Asia)
- Head coach: Rafael Fogageiro
- FIFA code: BHR
- FIFA ranking: 69 ▲14 (29 August 2025)
Home colours	Away colours

First international
- South Korea 5–5 Bahrain (Jakarta, Indonesia; 22 October 2002)

Biggest win
- Bahrain 8–3 Brunei (Jakarta, Indonesia; 26 October 2002)

Biggest defeat
- Bahrain 5–14 Jordan (Amman, Jordan; 2 September 2009)

FIFA World Cup
- Appearances: None

AFC Futsal Championship
- Appearances: 4 (First in 2002)
- Best result: Quarter-final (2018)

WAFF Futsal Championship
- Appearances: 2 (First in 2009)
- Best result: Fourth place (2009)

The Bahrain national futsal team represents Bahrain in international futsal competitions and is controlled by the Bahrain Football Association. As of August 2023, the team is placed 71 in FIFA rankings.

== Tournaments ==
=== FIFA Futsal World Cup ===
World Cup record
Year	Round	Pld	W	D	L	GS	GA	DIF
(Netherlands) 1989	Did not enter							
(Hong Kong) 1992	Did not enter							
(Spain) 1996	Did not enter							
(Guatemala) 2000	Did not enter							
(Taiwan) 2004	Did not enter							
(Brazil) 2008	Did not enter							
(Thailand) 2012	Did not qualify							
(Colombia) 2016	Did not qualify							
(Lithuania) 2021	Did not qualify							
(Uzbekistan) 2024	Did not qualify							
Total	0/10	0	0	0	0	0	0	0

=== AFC Futsal Championship ===
AFC Futsal Championship record
Year	Round	Pld	W	D	L	GS	GA	DIF
(Malaysia) 1999	Did not enter							
(Thailand) 2000	Did not enter							
(Iran) 2001	Did not enter							
(Indonesia) 2002	Group stage	4	1	1	2	18	29	-11
(Iran) 2003	Did not enter							
(Macau) 2004	Did not enter							
(Vietnam) 2005	Did not enter							
(Uzbekistan) 2006	Did not enter							
(Japan) 2007	Did not enter							
(Thailand) 2008	Did not enter							
(Uzbekistan) 2010	Did not qualify							
(United Arab Emirates) 2012	Did not qualify							
(Vietnam) 2014	Did not enter							
(Uzbekistan) 2016	Did not qualify							
(Taiwan) 2018	Quarter-final	4	1	1	2	6	7	-1
(Kuwait) 2022	Group stage	3	0	1	2	8	14	-6
(Thailand) 2024	Group stage	3	0	0	3	6	10	-4
(Indonesia) 2026	Did not qualify							
Total	4/17	14	2	3	9	38	60	-22

=== WAFF Futsal Championship ===
WAFF Futsal Championship record
Year	Round	Pld	W	D	L	GS	GA	DIF
(Iran) 2007	Did not enter							
(Jordan) 2009	Fourth place	4	2	0	2	11	8	+3
(Iran) 2012	Did not enter							
(Kuwait) 2022	Group stage	3	1	2	0	10	5	+5
Total	2/4	7	3	2	2	21	13	+8

== Players ==
=== Current squad ===
Players called for the 2018 AFC Futsal Championship.

No.	Pos.	Player	Date of birth (age)	Club
1	GK	Sayed Fadhel		(Bahrain Football Association) Al-Shabab
2	GK	Yusuf Abdulla		(Bahrain Football Association) Al-Najma
14	GK	Sayed Mohamed		
3	FP	Ali Al-Malki		
4	FP	Falah Abbas		(Bahrain Football Association) Al-Shabab
5	FP	Sayed Hashem		
6	FP	Ali Saleh		(Bahrain Football Association) Al-Najma
7	FP	Abdullah Al-Malki		(Bahrain Football Association) Al-Najma
8	FP	Mohamed Al-Sandi		(Bahrain Football Association) Al-Najma
9	FP	Mohammed Abdulla		(Bahrain Football Association) Al-Shabab
10	FP	Jassam Saleh		(Bahrain Football Association) Al-Najma
11	FP	Ahmed Abdulnabi		(Bahrain Football Association) Al-Shabab
12	FP	Salman Maula		(Bahrain Football Association) Al-Najma
13	FP	Ahmed Darwish		

=== Previous squads ===
AFC Futsal Championship

- 2018 AFC Futsal Championship squads
