= Hossein Tayyebi =

Iranian professional futsal player (born 1988)

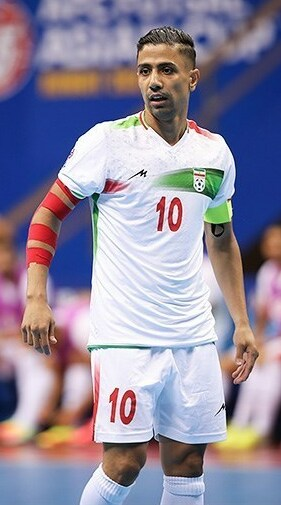
- Tayyebi with Iran in 2022

Personal information
- Full name: Hossein Tayyebi Bidgoli
- Date of birth: 29 September 1988 (age 38)
- Place of birth: Mashhad, Iran
- Height: 1.78 m (5 ft 10 in)
- Positions: Winger; pivot

Team information
- Current team: Palma
- Number: 15

Youth career
- 2000–2005: Pishgaman (football)
- 2005–2007: Elmo Adab

Senior career*
Years	Team	Apps	(Gls)
2007–2010	Elmo Adab		
2010–2012	Foolad Mahan		
2012–2013	Giti Pasand	22	(17)
2013–2015	Norilsk Nickel	90	(75)
2015–2016	Mes Sungun	25	(16)
2016	Tasisat Daryaei	4	(8)
2016–2020	Kairat Almaty	70	(105)
2017	→ Thái Sơn Nam (loan)	5	(8)
2018	→ Mes Sungun (loan)	5	(8)
2020–2022	Benfica	63	(47)
2022–2024	Palma	50	(28)

International career^{‡}
2006	Iran U18		
2007–2010	Iran U21		
2009–	Iran	130	(150)
Medal record
Representing Iran
Men's Futsal as player
FIFA Futsal World Cup
Bronze medal – third place	2016 Colombia
Grand Prix de Futsal
Silver medal – second place	2009 Brazil
Silver medal – second place	2015 Brazil
AFC Futsal Championship
Gold medal – first place	2016 Tashkent
Gold medal – first place	2018 Chinese Taipei
Silver medal – second place	2014 Ho Chi Minh City
Silver medal – second place	2022 Kuwait
Bronze medal – third place	2012 Dubai
AFC Futsal Asian Cup
Gold medal – first place	2026 Indonesia
Asian Indoor Games
Gold medal – first place	2013 Incheon
- * Club domestic league appearances and goals as of 8 July 2023 ‡ National team caps and goals as of 17 September 2020

Hossein Tayyebi Bidgoli (Persian: حسین طیبی بیدگلی; born 29 September 1988) is an Iranian professional futsal player who plays for Palma and the Iran national futsal team. His first match with Iran was in 2009 at the age of 20. He was ranked Top Goalscorer at the 2014 (15) and 2018 AFC Futsal Championship (14), and 5th Best Player in the World at the UMBRO Futsal Awards in 2017 and 2018.

== Honours ==
=== International ===
- FIFA Futsal World Cup
  - Third place (1): 2016
- AFC Futsal Championship
  - Champion (2): 2016, 2018
  - Runner-up (2): 2014, 2022
  - Third place (1): 2012
- Asian Indoor and Martial Arts Games
  - Champion (2): 2013, 2017
- Grand Prix
  - Runner-Up (2): 2009, 2015
  - Third place (2): 2013, 2014
- WAFF Futsal Championship
  - Champion (1): 2012

=== Club ===
- AFC Futsal Club Championship
  - Champion (1): 2018 (Mes Sungun)
  - Runner-Up (1): 2013 (Giti Pasand)
  - Third place (1): 2017 (Thái Sơn Nam)
- UEFA Futsal Champions League
  - champion: 2022–23, 2023-24 (AE Palma futsal)

Runner-up (1): 2018–19 (Kairat Almaty)

  - Third place (1): 2016–17 (Kairat Almaty)
- Iranian Futsal Super League
  - Champion (2): 2009–10 (Foolad Mahan), 2012–13 (Giti Pasand)
  - Runner-up (1): 2015–16 (Mes Sungun)
- Kazakhstani Futsal Championship
  - Champion (3): 2016–17 (Kairat Almaty), 2017–18 (Kairat Almaty), 2018–19 (Kairat Almaty)
- Kazakhstan Cup
  - Champion (2): 2016 (Kairat Almaty), 2017 (Kairat Almaty)
- Kazakhstan Super Cup
  - Champion (1): 2017 (Kairat Almaty)
- Eremenko Cup
  - Champion (2): 2017 (Kairat Almaty), 2018 (Kairat Almaty)

=== Individual ===
- Best new young player
  - Best new young futsal player of the 2009–10 Iranian Futsal Super League
- Best player
  - Best futsal player of the Futsal at the 2013 Asian Indoor and Martial Arts Games
  - Best futsal player of the 2015–16 Iranian Futsal Super League
- Top Goalscorer
  - Futsal at the 2013 Asian Indoor and Martial Arts Games
  - AFC Futsal Asian Cup: 2014 (15), 2018 (14)
  - Grand Prix de Futsal: 2014 (9)
  - Kazakhstan League & Cup: 2017 (Kairat Almaty) (11)
  - Eremenko Cup: 2017, 2018
- Runner-up Top Goalscorer
  - AFC Futsal Asian Cup: 2016
- UMBRO Futsal Awards
  - 5th Best Player in the World: 2017, 2018
- AFC Annual Awards
  - Nominated (among 3) for Futsal Player of the Year: 2013, 2014

== International goals ==
No.	Date	Venue	Opponent	Score	Result	Competition
1.	27 April 2012	Urmia, Iran	Kuwait	3–1	9–2	2012 WAFF Futsal Championship
2.	29 April 2012	Urmia, Iran	Palestine	8–0	19–1	2012 WAFF Futsal Championship
3.	29 April 2012	Urmia, Iran	Palestine	13–0	19–1	2012 WAFF Futsal Championship
4.	29 April 2012	Urmia, Iran	Palestine	17–0	19–1	2012 WAFF Futsal Championship
5.	2 May 2012	Urmia, Iran	Jordan	3–0	5–0	2012 WAFF Futsal Championship
6.	2 May 2012	Urmia, Iran	Jordan	4–0	5–0	2012 WAFF Futsal Championship
7.	25 May 2012	Dubai, UAE	South Korea	11–1	14–1	2012 AFC Futsal Championship
8.	26 May 2012	Dubai, UAE	Qatar	3–0	8–0	2012 AFC Futsal Championship
9.	26 May 2012	Dubai, UAE	Qatar	8–0	8–0	2012 AFC Futsal Championship
10.	27 May 2012	Dubai, UAE	Australia	6–0	9–0	2012 AFC Futsal Championship
11.	29 May 2012	Dubai, UAE	Uzbekistan	5–2	6–3	2012 AFC Futsal Championship
12.	30 May 2012	Dubai, UAE	Thailand	2–0	4–5 (a.e.t.)	2012 AFC Futsal Championship
13.	2 November 2012	Bangkok, Thailand	Spain	2–2	2–2	2012 FIFA Futsal World Cup
14.	27 June 2013	Incheon, South Korea	United Arab Emirates	3–0	13–0	2013 Asian Indoor and Martial Arts Games
15.	27 June 2013	Incheon, South Korea	United Arab Emirates	11–0	13–0	2013 Asian Indoor and Martial Arts Games
16.	27 June 2013	Incheon, South Korea	United Arab Emirates	12–0	13–0	2013 Asian Indoor and Martial Arts Games
17.	1 July 2013	Incheon, South Korea	Iraq	7–1	12–3	2013 Asian Indoor and Martial Arts Games
18.	1 July 2013	Incheon, South Korea	Iraq	8–2	12–3	2013 Asian Indoor and Martial Arts Games
19.	3 July 2013	Incheon, South Korea	China	3–0	8–0	2013 Asian Indoor and Martial Arts Games
20.	3 July 2013	Incheon, South Korea	China	8–0	8–0	2013 Asian Indoor and Martial Arts Games
21.	4 July 2013	Incheon, South Korea	Thailand	1–1	5–4	2013 Asian Indoor and Martial Arts Games
22.	4 July 2013	Incheon, South Korea	Thailand	2–1	5–4	2013 Asian Indoor and Martial Arts Games
23.	4 July 2013	Incheon, South Korea	Thailand	4–1	5–4	2013 Asian Indoor and Martial Arts Games
24.	6 July 2013	Incheon, South Korea	Japan	2–1	5–3	2013 Asian Indoor and Martial Arts Games
25.	30 April 2014	Hồ Chí Minh City, Vietnam	Indonesia	1–0	5–1	2014 AFC Futsal Championship
26.	2 May 2014	Hồ Chí Minh City, Vietnam	China	1–0	12–0	2014 AFC Futsal Championship
27.	2 May 2014	Hồ Chí Minh City, Vietnam	China	6–0	12–0	2014 AFC Futsal Championship
28.	2 May 2014	Hồ Chí Minh City, Vietnam	China	9–0	12–0	2014 AFC Futsal Championship
29.	2 May 2014	Hồ Chí Minh City, Vietnam	China	12–0	12–0	2014 AFC Futsal Championship
30.	4 May 2014	Hồ Chí Minh City, Vietnam	Australia	1–0	8–1	2014 AFC Futsal Championship
31.	4 May 2014	Hồ Chí Minh City, Vietnam	Australia	2–1	8–1	2014 AFC Futsal Championship
32.	4 May 2014	Hồ Chí Minh City, Vietnam	Australia	4–1	8–1	2014 AFC Futsal Championship
33.	7 May 2014	Hồ Chí Minh City, Vietnam	Vietnam	1–0	15–4	2014 AFC Futsal Championship
34.	7 May 2014	Hồ Chí Minh City, Vietnam	Vietnam	2–0	15–4	2014 AFC Futsal Championship
35.	7 May 2014	Hồ Chí Minh City, Vietnam	Vietnam	5–2	15–4	2014 AFC Futsal Championship
36.	8 May 2014	Hồ Chí Minh City, Vietnam	Uzbekistan	2–0	10–0	2014 AFC Futsal Championship
37.	8 May 2014	Hồ Chí Minh City, Vietnam	Uzbekistan	7–0	10–0	2014 AFC Futsal Championship
38.	8 May 2014	Hồ Chí Minh City, Vietnam	Uzbekistan	8–0	10–0	2014 AFC Futsal Championship
39.	10 May 2014	Hồ Chí Minh City, Vietnam	Japan	2–1	2–2 (a.e.t.) (0–3 p)	2014 AFC Futsal Championship
40.	10 February 2016	Tashkent, Uzbekistan	Jordan	2–0	6–0	2016 AFC Futsal Championship
41.	12 February 2016	Tashkent, Uzbekistan	China	5–0	7–0	2016 AFC Futsal Championship
42.	14 February 2016	Tashkent, Uzbekistan	Iraq	2–0	13–2	2016 AFC Futsal Championship
43.	14 February 2016	Tashkent, Uzbekistan	Iraq	6–0	13–2	2016 AFC Futsal Championship
44.	14 February 2016	Tashkent, Uzbekistan	Iraq	8–1	13–2	2016 AFC Futsal Championship
45.	14 February 2016	Tashkent, Uzbekistan	Iraq	12–1	13–2	2016 AFC Futsal Championship
46.	17 February 2016	Tashkent, Uzbekistan	Kyrgyzstan	1–0	7–0	2016 AFC Futsal Championship
47.	17 February 2016	Tashkent, Uzbekistan	Kyrgyzstan	3–0	7–0	2016 AFC Futsal Championship
48.	17 February 2016	Tashkent, Uzbekistan	Kyrgyzstan	7–0	7–0	2016 AFC Futsal Championship
49.	19 February 2016	Tashkent, Uzbekistan	Vietnam	5–0	13–1	2016 AFC Futsal Championship
50.	19 February 2016	Tashkent, Uzbekistan	Vietnam	10–1	13–1	2016 AFC Futsal Championship
51.	15 September 2016	Medellín, Colombia	Morocco	1–0	5–3	2016 FIFA Futsal World Cup
52.	18 September 2016	Medellín, Colombia	Azerbaijan	3–3	3–3	2016 FIFA Futsal World Cup
53.	21 September 2016	Bucaramanga, Colombia	Brazil	1–2	4–4 (a.e.t.) (3–2 p)	2016 FIFA Futsal World Cup
54.	18 September 2017	Ashgabat, Turkmenistan	Tahiti	15–1	16–1	2017 Asian Indoor and Martial Arts Games
55.	19 September 2017	Ashgabat, Turkmenistan	Jordan	3–0	7–3	2017 Asian Indoor and Martial Arts Games
56.	23 September 2017	Ashgabat, Turkmenistan	Thailand	4–2	10–4	2017 Asian Indoor and Martial Arts Games
57.	23 September 2017	Ashgabat, Turkmenistan	Thailand	7–2	10–4	2017 Asian Indoor and Martial Arts Games
58.	23 September 2017	Ashgabat, Turkmenistan	Thailand	8–2	10–4	2017 Asian Indoor and Martial Arts Games
59.	24 September 2017	Ashgabat, Turkmenistan	Afghanistan	3–0	8–2	2017 Asian Indoor and Martial Arts Games
60.	2 February 2018	Taipei, Taiwan	Myanmar	4–0	14–0	2018 AFC Futsal Championship
61.	2 February 2018	Taipei, Taiwan	Myanmar	6–0	14–0	2018 AFC Futsal Championship
62.	2 February 2018	Taipei, Taiwan	Myanmar	9–0	14–0	2018 AFC Futsal Championship
63.	4 February 2018	Taipei, Taiwan	China	1–0	11–1	2018 AFC Futsal Championship
64.	4 February 2018	Taipei, Taiwan	China	6–0	11–1	2018 AFC Futsal Championship
65.	4 February 2018	Taipei, Taiwan	China	11–1	11–1	2018 AFC Futsal Championship
66.	6 February 2018	Taipei, Taiwan	Iraq	1–1	5–3	2018 AFC Futsal Championship
67.	6 February 2018	Taipei, Taiwan	Iraq	5–3	5–3	2018 AFC Futsal Championship
68.	8 February 2018	New Taipei City, Taiwan	Thailand	4–0	9–1	2018 AFC Futsal Championship
69.	8 February 2018	New Taipei City, Taiwan	Thailand	5–0	9–1	2018 AFC Futsal Championship
70.	8 February 2018	New Taipei City, Taiwan	Thailand	9–1	9–1	2018 AFC Futsal Championship
71.	9 February 2018	New Taipei City, Taiwan	Uzbekistan	3–0	7–1	2018 AFC Futsal Championship
72.	9 February 2018	New Taipei City, Taiwan	Uzbekistan	7–0	7–1	2018 AFC Futsal Championship
73.	11 February 2018	New Taipei City, Taiwan	Japan	4–0	4–0	2018 AFC Futsal Championship
74.	10 April 2022	Bishkek, Kyrgyzstan	Maldives	3–0	17–0	2022 AFC Futsal Asian Cup qualification
75.	10 April 2022	Bishkek, Kyrgyzstan	Maldives	8–0	17–0	2022 AFC Futsal Asian Cup qualification
76.	10 April 2022	Bishkek, Kyrgyzstan	Maldives	9–0	17–0	2022 AFC Futsal Asian Cup qualification
77.	11 April 2022	Bishkek, Kyrgyzstan	Turkmenistan	1–0	3–0	2022 AFC Futsal Asian Cup qualification
78.	12 April 2022	Bishkek, Kyrgyzstan	Kyrgyzstan	1–1	8–1	2022 AFC Futsal Asian Cup qualification
79.	16 September 2022	Bangkok, Thailand	Morocco	?–?	3–4	Friendly
80.	16 September 2022	Bangkok, Thailand	Morocco	?–?	3–4	Friendly
81.	28 September 2022	Kuwait City, Kuwait	Indonesia	5–0	5–0	2022 AFC Futsal Asian Cup
82.	30 September 2022	Kuwait City, Kuwait	Chinese Taipei	2–0	10–1	2022 AFC Futsal Asian Cup
83.	30 September 2022	Kuwait City, Kuwait	Chinese Taipei	4–0	10–1	2022 AFC Futsal Asian Cup
84.	30 September 2022	Kuwait City, Kuwait	Chinese Taipei	10–1	10–1	2022 AFC Futsal Asian Cup
85.	2 October 2022	Kuwait City, Kuwait	Lebanon	2–0	9–0	2022 AFC Futsal Asian Cup
86.	2 October 2022	Kuwait City, Kuwait	Lebanon	9–0	9–0	2022 AFC Futsal Asian Cup
87.	4 October 2022	Kuwait City, Kuwait	Vietnam	3–0	8–1	2022 AFC Futsal Asian Cup
88.	4 October 2022	Kuwait City, Kuwait	Vietnam	6–0	8–1	2022 AFC Futsal Asian Cup
89.	4 October 2022	Kuwait City, Kuwait	Vietnam	7–0	8–1	2022 AFC Futsal Asian Cup
90.	6 October 2022	Kuwait City, Kuwait	Thailand	1–0	5–0	2022 AFC Futsal Asian Cup
91.	7 October 2023	Bishkek, Kyrgyzstan	Maldives	5–0	18–2	2024 AFC Futsal Asian Cup qualification
92.	7 October 2023	Bishkek, Kyrgyzstan	Maldives	7–1	18–2	2024 AFC Futsal Asian Cup qualification
93.	7 October 2023	Bishkek, Kyrgyzstan	Maldives	8–1	18–2	2024 AFC Futsal Asian Cup qualification
94.	7 October 2023	Bishkek, Kyrgyzstan	Maldives	18–2	18–2	2024 AFC Futsal Asian Cup qualification
95.	9 October 2023	Bishkek, Kyrgyzstan	Kyrgyzstan	1–0	10–2	2024 AFC Futsal Asian Cup qualification
96.	9 October 2023	Bishkek, Kyrgyzstan	Kyrgyzstan	5–0	10–2	2024 AFC Futsal Asian Cup qualification
97.	11 October 2023	Bishkek, Kyrgyzstan	Lebanon	3–0	6–0	2024 AFC Futsal Asian Cup qualification
