= Vietnamese National Futsal Cup =

- Founded: 2015
- Country: Vietnam
- Current champions: Thái Sơn Bắc F.C (2nd title) (2025)
- Most championships: Thái Sơn Nam (5 titles)
- Website: vff.org.vn
- Current: 2024 Vietnamese National Futsal Cup

The Vietnamese National Futsal Cup (Vietnamese: Giải Futsal Cup Quốc Gia) is a futsal cup competition in Vietnam. Hải Phương Nam (later known as Sahako F.C) won the first edition of the tournament.

The tournament plays on knock-out basis, so the winner of the tournament is the unbeaten team in each edition. Thái Sơn Nam is the most successful team with 5 times champion.

== List of winners ==
Year	Winner	Result	Runner-up	Venue
2015	Hải Phương Nam	6-1	An Phước Bình Thuận	Rạch Miễu Indoors Stadium
2016*	Thái Sơn Nam	1-1 (2-1)p	Hải Phương Nam	Rạch Miễu Indoors Stadium
2017	Thái Sơn Nam	2-1	Hải Phương Nam	Tiên Sơn Sport Complex
2018	Thái Sơn Nam	2-1	Sanna Khánh Hòa	Quảng Ninh Sport Complex
2019	Sanatech Khánh Hòa F.C	3-3 (3-2)p	Đà Nẵng F.C	Quân Khu 4 Sport Complex, Nghệ An
2020	Thái Sơn Nam	3-3 (6-5)p	Sanatech Khánh Hòa F.C	Đắk Lắk Arena, Đắk Lắk
2022	Sài Gòn F.C	6-4	Thái Sơn Nam	Lãnh Binh Thăng Arena, Ho Chi Minh City
2023	TSN Hồ Chí Minh City F.C	6-4	Cao Bằng	Lãnh Binh Thăng Arena, Ho Chi Minh City
2024	Thái Sơn Bắc F.C	10-1	TSN Hồ Chí Minh City F.C	Lãnh Binh Thăng Arena, Ho Chi Minh City
2025	Thái Sơn Bắc F.C	3-0	TSN Hồ Chí Minh City F.C	Lãnh Binh Thăng Arena, Ho Chi Minh City

(*) To be played in early 2017

== Top-performing clubs ==
Clubs	Champion	Runner-up
Thái Sơn Nam	5 (2016,2017,2018,2020,2023)	2 (2022,2024)
Thái Sơn Bắc F.C	2 (2024,2025)	0
Sahako F.C	1 (2015)	2 (2016,2017)
Sanatech Khánh Hòa F.C	1 (2019)	1 (2020)
Sài Gòn F.C	1 (2022)	0
An Phước Bình Thuận	0	1 (2015)
Sanna Khánh Hòa	0	1 (2018)
Đà Nẵng F.C	0	1 (2019)
Cao Bằng F.C	0	1 (2023)
