= 2018 AFC Futsal Championship =

2018亞足聯室內五人制足球錦標賽

Tournament details
- Host country: Taiwan
- Dates: 1–11 February
- Teams: 16 (from 1 confederation)
- Venue: 2 (in 2 host cities)

Final positions
- Champions: Iran (12th title)
- Runners-up: Japan
- Third place: Uzbekistan
- Fourth place: Iraq

Tournament statistics
- Matches played: 32
- Goals scored: 203 (6.34 per match)
- Attendance: 14,418 (451 per match)
- Top scorer: (Iran) Hossein Tayyebi (14 goals)
- Best player: (Iran) Ali Hassanzadeh
- Fair play award: Iraq

The 2018 AFC Futsal Championship was the 15th edition of the AFC Futsal Championship, the biennial international futsal championship organised by the Asian Football Confederation (AFC) for the men's national teams of Asia. The AFC appointed Taipei and New Taipei City, Taiwan (designated as Chinese Taipei by FIFA) as hosts on 29 July 2017; the tournament took place between 1 and 11 February 2018 at Xinzhuang Gymnasium and University of Taipei Gymnasium. A total of 16 teams played in the tournament.

Defending champions Iran defeated Japan in the final to win their 12th title.

== Qualification ==
Qualifying was played on 15 October – 12 November 2017.

=== Qualified teams ===
The following 16 teams qualified for the final tournament.

Team	Qualified as	Appearance	Previous best performance
Chinese Taipei	Hosts	12th	Quarter-finals (2003)
Vietnam	ASEAN Zone Group A winners	5th	Fourth place (2016)
Myanmar	ASEAN Zone Group A runners-up	1st	Debut
Thailand	ASEAN Zone Group B winners	15th	Runners-up (2008, 2012)
Malaysia	ASEAN Zone Group B runners-up	12th	Group stage (1999, 2001, 2002, 2003, 2004, 2005, 2006, 2007, 2008, 2014, 2016)
Japan	East Zone Group A winners	15th	Champions (2006, 2012, 2014)
South Korea	East Zone Group B winners	13th	Runners-up (1999)
China	East Zone play-off winners	12th	Fourth place (2008, 2010)
Uzbekistan	South & Central Zone Group A winners	15th	Runners-up (2001, 2006, 2010, 2016)
Kyrgyzstan	South & Central Zone Group A runners-up	15th	Semi-finals (2005), Fourth place (2006, 2007)
Iran	South & Central Zone Group B winners	15th	Champions (1999, 2000, 2001, 2002, 2003, 2004, 2005, 2007, 2008, 2010, 2016)
Tajikistan	South & Central Zone Group B runners-up	10th	Quarter-finals (2007)
Bahrain	West Zone Group A winners	2nd	Group stage (2002)
Iraq	West Zone Group A runners-up	11th	Quarter-finals (2002, 2016)
Lebanon	West Zone Group B winners	11th	Quarter-finals (2004, 2007, 2008, 2010, 2012, 2014)
Jordan	West Zone Group B runners-up	2nd	Group stage (2016)

== Venues ==
The competition was played in two venues in two cities.

New Taipei City	Taipei
Xinzhuang Gymnasium	University of Taipei (Tianmu Campus) Gymnasium
Capacity: 7,125	Capacity: 1,000

== Draw ==
The final draw was held on 12 December 2017, 11:00 TWT (UTC+8), at the Sherwood Taipei in Taipei. The 16 teams were drawn into four groups of four teams. The teams were seeded according to their performance in the 2016 AFC Futsal Championship final tournament and qualification, with the hosts Chinese Taipei automatically seeded and assigned to Position A1 in the draw.

Pot 1	Pot 2	Pot 3	Pot 4
1. Chinese Taipei (hosts); 2. Iran; 3. Uzbekistan; 4. Thailand	5. Vietnam; 6. Japan; 7. Iraq; 8. Kyrgyzstan	9. China; 10. Malaysia; 11. Lebanon; 12. Tajikistan	13. Jordan; 14. South Korea; 15. Bahrain; 16. Myanmar

== Squads ==
Each team must register a squad of 14 players, minimum two of whom must be goalkeepers (Regulations Articles 29.4 and 29.5).

== Match officials ==
The following referees were chosen for the 2018 AFC Futsal Championship.

Referees

- (Australia) Darius Turner
- (Bahrain) Hussain Ali Al-Bahhar
- (China) An Ran
- (China) Liu Jianqiao
- (Chinese Taipei) Lee Po-fu
- (Iran) Mahmoudreza Nasirloo
- (Iraq) Hasan Mousa Al-Gburi
- (Japan) Tomohiro Kozaki
- (South Korea) Kim Jong-hee
- (Kyrgyzstan) Nurdin Bukuev
- (Lebanon) Mohamad Chami
- (Malaysia) Helday Idang
- (Philippines) Rey Ritaga
- (Thailand) Yuttakon Maiket
- (Turkmenistan) Azat Hajypolatov
- (United Arab Emirates) Fahad Al-Hosani
- (Uzbekistan) Anatoliy Rubakov
- (Vietnam) Trương Quốc Dũng

== Group stage ==
The top two teams of each group advance to the quarter-finals.

Tiebreakers

Teams are ranked according to points (3 points for a win, 1 point for a draw, 0 points for a loss), and if tied on points, the following tiebreaking criteria are applied, in the order given, to determine the rankings (Regulations Article 11.5):

1. Points in head-to-head matches among tied teams;
2. Goal difference in head-to-head matches among tied teams;
3. Goals scored in head-to-head matches among tied teams;
4. If more than two teams are tied, and after applying all head-to-head criteria above, a subset of teams are still tied, all head-to-head criteria above are reapplied exclusively to this subset of teams;
5. Goal difference in all group matches;
6. Goals scored in all group matches;
7. Penalty shoot-out if only two teams are tied and they met in the last round of the group;
8. Disciplinary points (yellow card = 1 point, red card as a result of two yellow cards = 3 points, direct red card = 3 points, yellow card followed by direct red card = 4 points);
9. Drawing of lots.

All times are local, TWT (UTC+8).

Schedule
Matchday	Dates	Matches
Matchday 1	1–2 February 2018	1 v 4, 2 v 3
Matchday 2	3–4 February 2018	4 v 2, 3 v 1
Matchday 3	5–6 February 2018	1 v 2, 3 v 4

=== Group A ===
Pos	Team	Pld	W	D	L	GF	GA	GD	Pts	Qualification
1	Vietnam	3	2	0	1	6	4	+2	6	Knockout stage
2	Bahrain	3	1	1	1	6	5	+1	4	Knockout stage
3	Chinese Taipei (H)	3	1	1	1	8	9	−1	4	
4	Malaysia	3	1	0	2	7	9	−2	3	

Source: AFC
Rules for classification: Group stage tiebreakers
(H) Hosts
1 February 2018
16:30

Vietnam	1–2	Malaysia
Vũ Đức Tùng 19'	Report	Awalluddin 36', 40'

Xinzhuang Gymnasium, New Taipei City
Attendance: 182
Referee: Azat Hajypolatov (Turkmenistan)
1 February 2018
19:00

Chinese Taipei	2–2	Bahrain
Huang Tai-hsiang 30'; Lin Chih-hung 36'	Report	M. Abdulla 27'; Saleh 39'

Xinzhuang Gymnasium, New Taipei City
Attendance: 1,000
Referee: Hasan Mousa Al-Gburi (Iraq)

3 February 2018
16:30

Bahrain	1–2	Vietnam
Al-Sandi 28'	Report	Nguyễn Đắc Huy 18'; Phùng Trọng Luân 18'

Xinzhuang Gymnasium, New Taipei City
Attendance: 538
Referee: Tomohiro Kozaki (Japan)
3 February 2018
19:00

Malaysia	4–5	Chinese Taipei
Azwann 27'; Awalluddin 33'; Huang Tai-hsiang 35' (o.g.); Khairul 38'	Report	Lai Ming-hui 8', 32'; Lin Chih-hung 13', 39'; Chi Sheng-fa 21'

Xinzhuang Gymnasium, New Taipei City
Attendance: 2,477
Referee: Rey Ritaga (Philippines)

5 February 2018
19:00

Chinese Taipei	1–3	Vietnam
Huang Po-chun 19'	Report	Vũ Đức Tùng 29'; Phạm Đức Hòa 30'; Nguyễn Đắc Huy 39'

Xinzhuang Gymnasium, New Taipei City
Attendance: 2,200
Referee: Mohamad Chami (Lebanon)
5 February 2018
19:00

Malaysia	1–3	Bahrain
Aizad 33'	Report	Abdulnabi 3', 7'; Al-Sandi 40'

University of Taipei Gymnasium, Taipei
Attendance: 100
Referee: An Ran (China)

=== Group B ===
Pos	Team	Pld	W	D	L	GF	GA	GD	Pts	Qualification
1	Japan	3	3	0	0	13	6	+7	9	Knockout stage
2	Uzbekistan	3	2	0	1	19	8	+11	6	Knockout stage
3	Tajikistan	3	1	0	2	11	8	+3	3	
4	South Korea	3	0	0	3	4	25	−21	0	

Source: AFC
Rules for classification: Group stage tiebreakers
1 February 2018
16:30

Uzbekistan	13–2	South Korea
Yunusov 3'; Choriev 7', 8', 13'; Abdumavlyanov 11'; Ropiev 16'; Nishonov 22'; Shavkatov 22'; Hamroev 26'; D. Rakhmatov 31'; A. Rakhmatov 37'; Adilov 40', 40'	Report	Jang Yeong-cheol 25', 38'

University of Taipei Gymnasium, Taipei
Attendance: 100
Referee: Fahad Al-Hosani (United Arab Emirates)
1 February 2018
19:00

Japan	4–2	Tajikistan
Shimizu 1'; Nibuya 9'; Hoshi 11'; Morioka 37'	Report	Sardorov 6'; Alimakhmadov 13'

University of Taipei Gymnasium, Taipei
Attendance: 100
Referee: Yuttakon Maiket (Thailand)

3 February 2018
16:30

Tajikistan	2–4	Uzbekistan
Kuziev 18'; Salomov 39' (pen.)	Report	D. Rakhmatov 9'; Choriev 12', 37'; Adilov 26'

University of Taipei Gymnasium, Taipei
Attendance: 150
Referee: Nurdin Bukuev (Kyrgyzstan)
3 February 2018
19:00

South Korea	2–5	Japan
Park Young-jae 14'; Chun Jin-woo 29'	Report	Morioka 11', 29', 30', 39'; Takita 37'

University of Taipei Gymnasium, Taipei
Attendance: 683
Referee: Liu Jianqiao (China)

5 February 2018
16:30

Uzbekistan	2–4	Japan
Abdumavlyanov 3'; Yunusov 26'	Report	Morioka 21'; Hoshi 24', 35'; Nishitani 38'

University of Taipei Gymnasium, Taipei
Attendance: 96
Referee: Mahmoudreza Nasirloo (Iran)
5 February 2018
16:30

Tajikistan	7–0	South Korea
Halimov 11'; Khojaev 12'; Salomov 20'; R. Sharipov 23'; Hamidov 25'; Vositzoda 27'; Kuziev 39'	Report

Xinzhuang Gymnasium, New Taipei City
Attendance: 138
Referee: Darius Turner (Australia)

=== Group C ===
Pos	Team	Pld	W	D	L	GF	GA	GD	Pts	Qualification
1	Iran	3	3	0	0	30	4	+26	9	Knockout stage
2	Iraq	3	2	0	1	10	9	+1	6	Knockout stage
3	China	3	1	0	2	8	18	−10	3	
4	Myanmar	3	0	0	3	5	22	−17	0	

Source: AFC
Rules for classification: Group stage tiebreakers
2 February 2018
16:30

Iraq	4–2	China
Jabar 23', 28'; Dakheel 39' (pen.); Hameed 40'	Report	Gu Haitao 6'; Zhao Liang 11'

University of Taipei Gymnasium, Taipei
Attendance: 100
Referee: Anatoliy Rubakov (Uzbekistan)
2 February 2018
19:00

Iran	14–0	Myanmar
Javid 1', 8', 22', 31'; Hassanzadeh 1', 4', 8', 39'; Tayyebi 6', 8', 15'; Alighadr 7'; Ahmadabbasi 35'; Oladghobad 37'	Report

University of Taipei Gymnasium, Taipei
Attendance: 150
Referee: Lee Po-fu (Chinese Taipei)

4 February 2018
16:30

Myanmar	2–3	Iraq
Khin Zaw Lin 18'; Pyae Phyo Maung (2) 36'	Report	Khalid 15' (pen.), 36'; Jabar 22'

University of Taipei Gymnasium, Taipei
Attendance: 150
Referee: Yuttakon Maiket (Thailand)
4 February 2018
19:00

China	1–11	Iran
Xu Yang 20'	Report	Tayyebi 3', 14', 37'; Tavakoli 10', 27'; Javid 10', 14'; Shajari 14'; Hassanzadeh 21', 24'; Esmaeilpour 24'

University of Taipei Gymnasium, Taipei
Attendance: 216
Referee: Anatoliy Rubakov (Uzbekistan)

6 February 2018
16:30

Iran	5–3	Iraq
Tayyebi 8', 38'; Hassanzadeh 12'; Oladghobad 26'; Tavakoli 31'	Report	Khalid 8'; Mohammed 29', 34'

University of Taipei Gymnasium, Taipei
Attendance: 150
Referee: Hussain Ali Al-Bahhar (Bahrain)
6 February 2018
16:30

China	5–3	Myanmar
Shen Siming 10'; Zhang Yameng 14', 33'; Gu Haitao 19'; Xu Yang 21'	Report	Nyein Min Soe 1'; Pyae Phyo Maung (2) 35', 38'

Xinzhuang Gymnasium, New Taipei City
Attendance: 30
Referee: Darius Turner (Australia)

=== Group D ===
Pos	Team	Pld	W	D	L	GF	GA	GD	Pts	Qualification
1	Lebanon	3	2	1	0	9	5	+4	7	Knockout stage
2	Thailand	3	2	0	1	15	7	+8	6	Knockout stage
3	Kyrgyzstan	3	1	1	1	6	11	−5	4	
4	Jordan	3	0	0	3	3	10	−7	0	

Source: AFC
Rules for classification: Group stage tiebreakers
2 February 2018
16:30

Kyrgyzstan	2–2	Lebanon
Alimov 16'; Imanbekov 34'	Report	Kheir El-Dine 21', 28'

Xinzhuang Gymnasium, New Taipei City
Attendance: 50
Referee: Helday Idang (Malaysia)
2 February 2018
19:00

Thailand	5–1	Jordan
Apiwat 6', 18'; Jirawat 9' (pen.); Jetsada 32'; Kritsada 35'	Report	Abu Shaikha 20'

Xinzhuang Gymnasium, New Taipei City
Attendance: 150
Referee: Kim Jong-hee (South Korea)

4 February 2018
16:30

Jordan	1–3	Kyrgyzstan
Shabib 27'	Report	Alimov 8'; Abdrasul Uulu 11'; Imanbekov 34'

Xinzhuang Gymnasium, New Taipei City
Attendance: 150
Referee: Hasan Mousa Al-Gburi (Iraq)
4 February 2018
19:00

Lebanon	5–2	Thailand
Kobeissy 3'; Kheir El-Dine 5'; Tneich 22'; Zeitoun 25'; El-Homsi 39'	Report	M. Zeid 27' (o.g.); Suphawut 29'

Xinzhuang Gymnasium, New Taipei City
Attendance: 280
Referee: Hussain Ali Al-Bahhar (Bahrain)

6 February 2018
19:00

Thailand	8–1	Kyrgyzstan
Suphawut 3', 21', 31' (pen.); Apiwat 20', 20'; Nattawut 31'; Jetsada 33', 40'	Report	Salimbaev 37'

University of Taipei Gymnasium, Taipei
Attendance: 268
Referee: Rey Ritaga (Philippines)
6 February 2018
19:00

Lebanon	2–1	Jordan
El-Homsi 15'; Tneich 26'	Report	Samara 12'

Xinzhuang Gymnasium, New Taipei City
Attendance: 15
Referee: Trương Quốc Dũng (Vietnam)

== Knockout stage ==
In the knockout stage, extra time and penalty shoot-out are used to decide the winner if necessary, except for the third place match where penalty shoot-out (no extra time) is used to decide the winner if necessary (Regulations Article 15.1).

=== Bracket ===
Quarter-finals
8 February – U. of Taipei Gym.
Lebanon	2 (8)
Iraq (p)	2 (9)
8 February – U. of Taipei Gym.
Japan	2
Bahrain	0
8 February – Xinzhuang Gym.
Iran	9
Thailand	1
8 February – Xinzhuang Gym.
Vietnam	1
Uzbekistan	3

Semi-finals
9 February – Xinzhuang Gym.
Iraq	0
Japan	3
9 February – Xinzhuang Gym.
Iran	7
Uzbekistan	1

Final
11 February – Xinzhuang Gym.
Japan	0
Iran	4
Third place
11 February – Xinzhuang Gym.
Iraq	4 (1)
Uzbekistan (p)	4 (2)

=== Quarter-finals ===
8 February 2018
16:00

Lebanon	2–2 (a.e.t.)	Iraq
Koussan 11'; Tneich 22'	Report	Faisal 7', 26'
Penalties
Kheir El-Dine (penalty missed); K. Zeid (penalty scored); Tneich (penalty scored); Zeitoun (penalty scored); El-Homsi (penalty scored); Kobeissy (penalty scored); Hamadani (penalty scored); Hammoud (penalty scored); M. Zeid (penalty scored); Rhyem (penalty missed)	8–9	(penalty scored) Khalid; (penalty scored) Abdeen; (penalty missed) Dakheel; (penalty scored) Bachay; (penalty scored) Ali; (penalty scored) Mahdi; (penalty scored) Riyadh; (penalty scored) Al-Zubiaidi; (penalty scored) Mohammed; (penalty scored) Zeyad

University of Taipei Gymnasium, Taipei
Attendance: 200
Referee: Nurdin Bukuev (Kyrgyzstan)

8 February 2018
16:00

Iran	9–1	Thailand
Esmaeilpour 1', 3'; Hassanzadeh 4'; Tayyebi 5', 16', 36'; Javid 21'; Shajari 24', 35'	Report	Jirawat 22'

Xinzhuang Gymnasium, New Taipei City
Attendance: 300
Referee: Tomohiro Kozaki (Japan)

8 February 2018
19:00

Japan	2–0	Bahrain
Saito 7'; Shimizu 28'	Report

University of Taipei Gymnasium, Taipei
Attendance: 266
Referee: Mahmoudreza Nasirloo (Iran)

8 February 2018
19:00

Vietnam	1–3	Uzbekistan
Phùng Trọng Luân 28'	Report	Adilov 8'; Choriev 28'; Hamroev 39'

Xinzhuang Gymnasium, New Taipei City
Attendance: 350
Referee: Mohamad Chami (Lebanon)

=== Semi-finals ===
9 February 2018
16:00

Iraq	0–3	Japan
	Report	Morioka 1'; Nishitani 6'; Murota 19'

Xinzhuang Gymnasium, New Taipei City
Attendance: 450
Referee: Rey Ritaga (Philippines)

9 February 2018
19:00

Iran	7–1	Uzbekistan
Javid 2', 15', 16'; Hassanzadeh 3', 30'; Tayyebi 10', 34'	Report	A. Rakhmatov 39'

Xinzhuang Gymnasium, New Taipei City
Attendance: 740
Referee: An Ran (China)

=== Third place match ===
11 February 2018
16:00

Iraq	4–4	Uzbekistan
Ali 14'; Khalid 20'; Faisal 22'; Dakheel 34'	Report	Choriev 2'; Yunusov 25', 39'; Hamroev 27'
Penalties
Khalid (penalty scored); Dakheel (penalty missed); Abdeen (penalty missed)	1–2	(penalty scored) Abdurakhmanov; (penalty missed) Nishonov; (penalty scored) Sviridov

Xinzhuang Gymnasium, New Taipei City
Attendance: 889
Referee: Helday Idang (Malaysia)

=== Final ===
11 February 2018
19:00

Japan	0–4	Iran
	Report	Hassanzadeh 19', 28'; Tavakoli 21'; Tayyebi 39'

Xinzhuang Gymnasium, New Taipei City
Attendance: 1,750
Referee: Mohamad Chami (Lebanon)

== Awards ==
The following awards were given at the conclusion of the tournament:

Top Goalscorer	Most Valuable Player	Fair Play award
(Iran) Hossein Tayyebi	(Iran) Ali Asghar Hassanzadeh	Iraq

== Goalscorers ==
There were 203 goals scored in 32 matches, for an average of 6.34 goals per match.

14 goals

- (Iran) Hossein Tayyebi

12 goals

- (Iran) Ali Asghar Hassanzadeh

10 goals

- (Iran) Mahdi Javid

7 goals

- (Japan) Kaoru Morioka
- (Uzbekistan) Davron Choriev

4 goals

- (Iran) Farhad Tavakoli
- (Iraq) Waleed Khalid
- (Thailand) Apiwat Chaemcharoen
- (Thailand) Suphawut Thueanklang
- (Uzbekistan) Mashrab Adilov
- (Uzbekistan) Artur Yunusov

3 goals

- (Chinese Taipei) Lin Chih-hung
- (Iran) Ahmad Esmaeilpour
- (Iran) Mohammad Shajari
- (Iraq) Salim Faisal
- (Iraq) Hassan Ali Jabar
- (Japan) Shota Hoshi
- (Lebanon) Ahmad Kheir El-Dine
- (Lebanon) Ali Tneich
- (Malaysia) Awalluddin Nawi
- (Myanmar) Pyae Phyo Maung (2)
- (Thailand) Jetsada Chudech
- (Uzbekistan) Ilhomjon Hamroev

2 goals

- (Bahrain) Ahmed Abdulnabi
- (Bahrain) Mohamed Al-Sandi
- (China) Gu Haitao
- (China) Xu Yang
- (China) Zhang Yameng
- (Chinese Taipei) Lai Ming-hui
- (Iran) Moslem Oladghobad
- (Iraq) Hasan Dakheel
- (Iraq) Firas Mohammed
- (Japan) Ryosuke Nishitani
- (Japan) Kazuya Shimizu
- (Kyrgyzstan) Maksat Alimov
- (Kyrgyzstan) Adilet Imanbekov
- (Lebanon) Ali El-Homsi
- (South Korea) Jang Yeong-cheol
- (Tajikistan) Umed Kuziev
- (Tajikistan) Dilshod Salomov
- (Thailand) Jirawat Sornwichian
- (Uzbekistan) Farkhod Abdumavlyanov
- (Uzbekistan) Anaskhon Rakhmatov
- (Uzbekistan) Dilshod Rakhmatov
- (Vietnam) Nguyễn Đắc Huy
- (Vietnam) Phùng Trọng Luân
- (Vietnam) Vũ Đức Tùng

1 goal

- (Bahrain) Mohamed Abdulla
- (Bahrain) Ali Saleh
- (China) Shen Siming
- (China) Zhao Liang
- (Chinese Taipei) Chi Sheng-fa
- (Chinese Taipei) Huang Po-chun
- (Chinese Taipei) Huang Tai-hsiang
- (Iran) Saeid Ahmadabbasi
- (Iran) Mehran Alighadr
- (Iraq) Zaid Ali
- (Iraq) Rafid Hameed
- (Japan) Yuki Murota
- (Japan) Kazuhiro Nibuya
- (Japan) Koichi Saito
- (Japan) Manabu Takita
- (Jordan) Abdel Samara
- (Jordan) Qais Shabib
- (Jordan) Musa Abu Shaikha
- (Kyrgyzstan) Iuldashbai Salimbaev
- (Kyrgyzstan) Manas Abdrasul Uulu
- (Lebanon) Mohamad Kobeissy
- (Lebanon) Kassem Koussan
- (Lebanon) Hassan Zeitoun
- (Malaysia) Aizad Daniel
- (Malaysia) Azwann Ismail
- (Malaysia) Khairul Effendy
- (Myanmar) Khin Zaw Lin
- (Myanmar) Nyein Min Soe
- (South Korea) Chun Jin-woo
- (South Korea) Park Young-jae
- (Tajikistan) Nekruz Alimakhmadov
- (Tajikistan) Shavqat Halimov
- (Tajikistan) Rustam Hamidov
- (Tajikistan) Bahodur Khojaev
- (Tajikistan) Fayzali Sardorov
- (Tajikistan) Rahmonali Sharipov
- (Tajikistan) Iqboli Vositzoda
- (Thailand) Nattawut Madyalan
- (Thailand) Kritsada Wongkaeo
- (Uzbekistan) Khusniddin Nishonov
- (Uzbekistan) Ikhtiyor Ropiev
- (Uzbekistan) Dilmurod Shavkatov
- (Vietnam) Phạm Đức Hòa

1 own goal

- (Chinese Taipei) Huang Tai-hsiang (against Malaysia)
- (Lebanon) Mohammad Abou Zeid (against Thailand)

== Tournament team rankings ==
As per statistical convention in football, matches decided in extra time are counted as wins and losses, while matches decided by penalty shoot-outs are counted as draws.

Pos	Team	Pld	W	D	L	GF	GA	GD	Pts	Final results
1	Iran	6	6	0	0	50	6	+44	18	Champions
2	Japan	6	5	0	1	18	10	+8	15	Runners-up
3	Uzbekistan	6	3	1	2	27	20	+7	10	Third place
4	Iraq	6	2	2	2	16	18	−2	8	Fourth place
5	Lebanon	4	2	2	0	11	7	+4	8	Eliminated in quarter-finals
6	Thailand	4	2	0	2	16	16	0	6	Eliminated in quarter-finals
7	Vietnam	4	2	0	2	7	7	0	6	Eliminated in quarter-finals
8	Bahrain	4	1	1	2	6	7	−1	4	Eliminated in quarter-finals
9	Chinese Taipei (H)	3	1	1	1	8	9	−1	4	Third place in group stage
10	Kyrgyzstan	3	1	1	1	6	11	−5	4	Third place in group stage
11	Tajikistan	3	1	0	2	11	8	+3	3	Third place in group stage
12	China	3	1	0	2	8	18	−10	3	Third place in group stage
13	Malaysia	3	1	0	2	7	9	−2	3	Fourth place in group stage
14	Jordan	3	0	0	3	3	10	−7	0	Fourth place in group stage
15	Myanmar	3	0	0	3	5	22	−17	0	Fourth place in group stage
16	South Korea	3	0	0	3	4	25	−21	0	Fourth place in group stage

Source: AFC

== See also ==
- List of sporting events in Taiwan
