= Vietnam Futsal League =

- Founded: 2009
- Country: Vietnam
- Confederation: AFC
- Number of clubs: Men:8; Women:5
- Level on pyramid: 1
- Domestic cup(s): Vietnamese National Futsal Cup; LS Cup
- International cup(s): AFC Futsal Club Championship; AFF Futsal Club Championship
- Current champions: Thái Sơn Bắc (2nd title) (2026)
- Most championships: TSN Hồ Chí Minh City (13)
- Broadcaster(s): Q.net Television; SCTV
- Website: Vietnam Futsal League
- Current: 2026 Vietnam Futsal League

The Vietnam Futsal League (Vietnamese: Giải Futsal vô địch quốc gia, lit. 'National Futsal Championship') is the top league for Futsal in Vietnam. The winning team obtains the participation right to the AFC Futsal Club Championship.

== History ==
In 2007, Ho Chi Minh City Football Federation launched All Vietnam Futsal Championship (Vietnamese: Giải Futsal vô địch toàn quốc) aiming to develop futsal in Vietnam. In 2009, VFF announced to take control the competition. In 2015, the competition ran in league format and changed name into Vietnam Futsal League and it has been divided into 2 stages: First-stage will be runs by 10 teams and Second-stage will run by top 8 best team in First-stage. Top 6 best team in second-stage will join the second-stage in next edition automatically

Since 2023, there are 8 teams have joined and played under Home and Away Format

HD Bank is the main sponsored so it is also called as HD Bank Vietnam Futsal League (Vietnamese: Giải Futsal Vô địch Quốc gia cúp HD Bank)

== Clubs ==
Competition of 8 clubs in 2023 season:

| Team | Location | Home Stadium | Capacity | Founded |
|---|---|---|---|---|
| Hà Nội F.C | Hà Nội | Mỹ Đình Palace of Athletics | 3,110 | 2023 |
| Sanvinest Khánh Hòa | Khánh Hòa | Nha Trang Pedagogical College Hall | 1,000 | 2009 |
| Thái Sơn Bắc | Hà Nội | Mỹ Đình Palace of Athletics | 3,110 | 2010 |
| Thai Son Nam HCMC | Ho Chi Minh City | Thái Sơn Nam District 8 Arena | 350 | 2007 |
| Tân Hiệp Hưng | Ho Chi Minh City | Lãnh Binh Thăng Arena | 2,000 | 2008 |
| GFDI Sông Hàn | Đà Nẵng | Tiên Sơn Arena | 7,200 | 2023 |
| Cao Bằng | Cao Bằng | Thái Sơn Nam District 8 Arena | 350 | 2016 |
| Sahako F.C | Ho Chi Minh City | Lãnh Binh Thăng Arena | 2,000 | 2012 |

== Championship history ==
=== Vietnam Futsal League ===
| Season | Winner | Runner up | Third place |
|---|---|---|---|
| 2026 | Thái Sơn Bắc (2) | Thai Son Nam HCMC | Sahako F.C |
| 2025 | Thai Son Nam HCMC (13) | Thái Sơn Bắc | Sahako F.C |
| 2024 | Thai Son Nam HCMC (12) | Thái Sơn Bắc | Sahako F.C |
| 2023 | Thai Son Nam HCMC (11) | Sahako F.C | Thái Sơn Bắc |
| 2022 | Sahako F.C (1) | Thái Sơn Nam | Sài Gòn F.C |
| 2021 | Thái Sơn Nam (10) | Sahako F.C | Sài Gòn F.C |
| 2020 | Thái Sơn Nam (9) | Sahako F.C | Sanatech Khánh Hòa |
| 2019 | Thái Sơn Nam (8) | Sahako F.C | Sanatech Khánh Hòa |
| 2018 | Thái Sơn Nam (7) | Sanatech Khánh Hòa | Hải Phương Nam Phú Nhuận |
| 2017 | Thái Sơn Nam (6) | Sanatech Khánh Hòa | Hải Phương Nam Phú Nhuận |
| 2016 | Thái Sơn Nam (5) | Sanna Khánh Hòa | Sanatech Khánh Hòa |
| 2015 | Sanna Khánh Hòa (1) | Thái Sơn Bắc | Thái Sơn Nam |

=== All Vietnam Futsal Championship ===
| Season | Winner | Runner up | Third place |
|---|---|---|---|
| 2014 | Thái Sơn Nam (4) | Tâm Nhật Minh | Thái Sơn Bắc |
| 2013 | Thái Sơn Nam (3) | Sanna Khánh Hòa | Thái Sơn Bắc |
| 2012 | Thái Sơn Nam (2) | Sanna Khánh Hòa | Thái Sơn Bắc |
| 2011 | Tâm Nhật Minh (1) | Thái Sơn Nam | Tân Hiệp Hưng |
| 2010 | Thái Sơn Bắc (1) | Thái Sơn Nam | Hoàng Thư Đà Nẵng |
| 2009 | Thái Sơn Nam (1) | Hoàng Thư Đà Nẵng | Đất Lành |

=== Ho Chi Minh City Futsal Championship (Unofficial) ===
| Season | Winner | Runner up | Third place |
|---|---|---|---|
| 2008 | Thái Sơn Nam | Thái Sơn Bac | Hoàng Thư Đà Nẵng |
| 2007 | Dilmah Hà Nội | Police District 11 | Tiền Giang |

== Vietnam Women's Futsal Championship ==
| Season | Winner | Runner up | Third place |
|---|---|---|---|
| 2024 | Thái Sơn Nam (3) | Hồ Chí Minh City | Phong Phú Hà Nam |
| 2023 | Thái Sơn Nam (2) | Phong Phú Hà Nam | Hồ Chí Minh City |
| 2022 | Thái Sơn Nam (1) | Phong Phú Hà Nam | Hà Nội |

== License Broadcast Marketing Official ==
| Year | Broadcast channel |
|---|---|
| 2017-2022 | VTC (Digital TV Official) |
| 2017-2018 | MET TV (Online channel) |
| 2023-2024 | VTVcab; On Football VTC4 |
| 2025-2029 | SKTV8, SKTV Sports 2, SCTV15, SCTV17 |

== Digital New media ==
| Operating system | Application | channel | Ref. |
|---|---|---|---|
| Android | VTC Now | VTC3 | |
| iOS | VTC Now | VTC3 | |
