= Savinest Khánh Hòa Futsal Club =

Savinest Khánh Hòa
- Full name: Savinest Khánh Hòa Futsal Club
- Founded: 2009; 16 years ago (as Sanna Khánh Hòa); 2020; 5 years ago (as Savinest Khánh Hòa)
- Ground: Nha Trang Pedagogical College Hall
- Capacity: 1,000
- Chairman: Nguyễn Thanh Hải
- Manager: Mai Thành Đạt
- League: Vietnam Futsal League
- 2022: 6th
| Home colours | Away colours |

Savinest Khánh Hòa Futsal Club (Vietnamese: Câu lạc bộ bóng đá trong nhà Savinest Khánh Hòa) is a Vietnamese Futsal club. They currently play in the Vietnam National Futsal League

== Honours ==
=== Domestic Leagues ===
- Vietnam National Futsal League
  - Champion(1):2015
  - Runner-up (3):2013,2014,2016

=== Cup ===
- Vietnamese National Futsal Cup
  - Runner-up (1):2018

=== Continental ===
- AFC Futsal Club Championship
  - Quarter-Final (1): 2016

=== Regional ===
- AFF Futsal Club Championship
  - Runner-up(1): 2017

== Continental record ==
| Season | Competition | Round | Country | Opponent | Result | Venue |
|---|---|---|---|---|---|---|
| 2015 | AFF Futsal Club Championship | Group Stage | (Myanmar) | MIC | 1–1 | Bangkok |
| 2015 | AFF Futsal Club Championship | Group Stage | (Australia) | East Coast Heat | 1–3 | Bangkok |
| 2015 | AFF Futsal Club Championship | Group Stage | (Malaysia) | FELDA United | 2–4 | Bangkok |
| 2015 | AFF Futsal Club Championship | Group Stage | (Thailand) | Port F.C | 1–1 | Bangkok |
| 2016 | AFC Futsal Club Championship | Group Stage | (Chinese Taipei) | Taipower | 3–0 | Bangkok |
| 2016 | AFC Futsal Club Championship | Group Stage | (Qatar) | Al Sadd | 3–2 | Bangkok |
| 2016 | AFC Futsal Club Championship | Quarter-Finals | (United Arab Emirates) | Dibba Al-Hisn | 2–6 | Bangkok |
| 2017 | AFF Futsal Club Championship | Group Stage | (Malaysia) | Melaka United | 1–1 | Bangkok |
| 2017 | AFF Futsal Club Championship | Group Stage | (Laos) | Vientiane United | 9–2 | Bangkok |
| 2017 | AFF Futsal Club Championship | Group Stage | (Australia) | East Coast Heat | 6–2 | Bangkok |
| 2017 | AFF Futsal Club Championship | Semi-Finals | (Indonesia) | Permata Indah | 3–0 | Bangkok |
| 2017 | AFF Futsal Club Championship | Final | (Thailand) | Port F.C | 0–4 | Bangkok |

== Current players ==
Note: Flags indicate national team as defined under FIFA eligibility rules; some limited exceptions apply. Players may hold more than one non-FIFA nationality.

| No. | Pos. | Nation | Player |
|---|---|---|---|
| 1 | GK | (Vietnam) VIE | Nguyễn Đình Ý Hòa |
| 2 | DF | (Vietnam) VIE | Nguyễn Trung Nam |
| 3 | DF | (Vietnam) VIE | Lê Phi Thăng |
| 4 | MF | (Vietnam) VIE | Trần Ngọc Tuyên |
| 5 | DF | (Vietnam) VIE | Nguyễn Việt Tân |
| 6 | MF | (Vietnam) VIE | Trần Văn Thành |
| 7 | MF | (Vietnam) VIE | Đặng Phước Hạnh |
| 8 | DF | (Vietnam) VIE | Lê Anh Tuấn |

| No. | Pos. | Nation | Player |
|---|---|---|---|
| 9 | FW | (Vietnam) VIE | Nguyễn Đình Thanh |
| 10 | FW | (Vietnam) VIE | Phan Khắc Chí |
| 11 | MF | (Vietnam) VIE | Nguyễn Quốc Bảo |
| 12 | GK | (Vietnam) VIE | Nguyễn Hoàng Anh |
| 13 | GK | (Vietnam) VIE | Nguyễn Xuân Đức |
| 14 | FW | (Vietnam) VIE | Trần Quang Toàn |

== See also ==
Sanna Khánh Hòa F.C.
