= Thai Son Nam HCMC Futsal Club =

Thai Son Nam HCMC
- Full name: Thai Son Nam - Ho Chi Minh City Futsal Club
- Founded: 2001; 25 years ago
- Ground: Thai Son Nam Stadium
- Capacity: 2,500
- Chairman: Trần Anh Tú
- Coach: (Argentina) Nicolas Gustavo
- League: Vietnam Futsal League
- 2023: 1st
Home colours	Away colours

Thai Son Nam - Ho Chi Minh City Futsal Club (abbreviated TSN - HCMC FC, Vietnamese: Câu lạc bộ Futsal Thái Sơn Nam - Thành phố Hồ Chí Minh, or CLB Futsal TSN - TPHCM for short), simply Thai Son Nam is a Vietnamese futsal club based on Ho Chi Minh City, Vietnam. The team is the current champion of Vietnam National Futsal League and is the most successful futsal club in Vietnam. They also reached to AFC Futsal Club Championship final in 2018, and won three bronze medals in 2015, 2017 and 2019.

== Honours ==
=== League ===
- Vietnam Futsal League
  - Winners (12): 2009, 2012, 2013, 2014, 2016, 2017, 2018, 2019, 2020, 2021, 2023, 2024
  - (silver) Runners-up (3): 2010, 2011, 2022
  - (bronze) Third place (1): 2015

=== Cup ===
- Vietnamese National Futsal Cup
  - Champions (5): 2016, 2017, 2018, 2020, 2023
  - (silver) Runners-up (2): 2022, 2024
- Ho Chi Minh City Futsal Cup
  - Champions (4): 2015, 2017, 2018, 2019
  - (silver) Runners-up (1): 2014
  - (bronze) Third place (1): 2016

=== International ===
- AFC Futsal Club Championship
  - (silver) Runner-up (1): 2018
  - (bronze) Third place (3): 2015, 2017, 2019
- AFF Futsal Club Championship
  - (silver) Runner-up (1): 2016
  - (bronze) Third place (1): 2023

== AFC Championship appearances ==
- (Kuwait) 2012 — Group stage
- (Japan) 2013 — Group stage
- (Iran) 2015 — (bronze) Third place
- (Vietnam) 2017 — (bronze) Third place
- (Indonesia) 2018 — (silver) Runner-up
- (Thailand) 2019 — (bronze) Third place

== Kit suppliers and shirt sponsors ==
Period	Kit manufacturer	Shirt sponsor
2016-2018	(Spain) Joma	LS
2018–present	(Japan) Mizuno	LS

== International results ==
Season	Competition	Round	Country	Opponent	Result	Venue
2012	AFC Futsal Club Championship	Preliminary Round	(Australia)	Maccabi Hakoah	1–0	Ho Chi Minh City
2012	AFC Futsal Club Championship	Preliminary Round	(China)	Guangzhou Baiyunshan	3–1	Ho Chi Minh City
2012	AFC Futsal Club Championship	Preliminary Round	(Indonesia)	Pelindo	2–1	Ho Chi Minh City
2012	AFC Futsal Club Championship	Preliminary Round	(Thailand)	Chonburi Bluewave	0–1	Ho Chi Minh City
2012	AFC Futsal Club Championship	Group Stage	(Iran)	Giti Pasand Isfahan	0–8	Kuwait City
2012	AFC Futsal Club Championship	Group Stage	(Kuwait)	Al-Yarmouk	0–6	Kuwait City
2012	AFC Futsal Club Championship	Group Stage	(Qatar)	Al Rayyan	2–2	Kuwait City
2013	AFC Futsal Club Championship	Preliminary Round	(Australia)	Dural Warriors	6–2	Shah Alam
2013	AFC Futsal Club Championship	Preliminary Round	(Indonesia)	Pelindo	2–2	Shah Alam
2013	AFC Futsal Club Championship	Preliminary Round	(China)	Shenzhen Nanling	2–4 (a.e.t)	Shah Alam
2013	AFC Futsal Club Championship	Preliminary Round	(Australia)	Dural Warriors	6–3	Shah Alam
2013	AFC Futsal Club Championship	Group Stage	(China)	Shenzhen Nanling	2–2	Nagoya
2013	AFC Futsal Club Championship	Group Stage	(Japan)	Nagoya Oceans	2–7	Nagoya
2013	AFC Futsal Club Championship	Group Stage	(Lebanon)	Al Sadaka	1–6	Nagoya
2015	AFC Futsal Club Championship	Group Stage	(China)	Shenzhen Nanling	5–1	Isfahan
2015	AFC Futsal Club Championship	Group Stage	(Lebanon)	Bank of Beirut	3–3	Isfahan
2015	AFC Futsal Club Championship	Quarter-Finals	(Qatar)	Al Rayyan	2–1	Isfahan
2015	AFC Futsal Club Championship	Semi-Finals	(Kuwait)	Al Qadsia	3–3 (pens. 1–2)	Isfahan
2015	AFC Futsal Club Championship	Third-Place	(Iraq)	Naft Al-Wasat	7–3	Isfahan
2016	AFF Futsal Club Championship	Group Stage	(Laos)	Lanexang United	14–4	Naypyidaw
2016	AFF Futsal Club Championship	Group Stage	(Thailand)	Thai Port	0–4	Naypyidaw
2016	AFF Futsal Club Championship	Group Stage	(Indonesia)	Black Steel Manokwari	7–2	Naypyidaw
2016	AFF Futsal Club Championship	Group Stage	(Myanmar)	MIC	4–1	Naypyidaw
2016	AFF Futsal Club Championship	Final	(Thailand)	Thai Port	3–4	Naypyidaw
2017	AFC Futsal Club Championship	Group Stage	(Kyrgyzstan)	Osh EREM	4–5	Ho Chi Minh City
2017	AFC Futsal Club Championship	Group Stage	(Australia)	Vic Vipers	9–2	Ho Chi Minh City
2017	AFC Futsal Club Championship	Group Stage	(United Arab Emirates)	Al Dhafra	2–0	Ho Chi Minh City
2017	AFC Futsal Club Championship	Quarter-Finals	(Iraq)	Naft Al-Wasat	4–0	Ho Chi Minh City
2017	AFC Futsal Club Championship	Semi-Finals	(Thailand)	Chonburi Bluewave	0–6	Ho Chi Minh City
2017	AFC Futsal Club Championship	Third-Place	(Qatar)	Al Rayyan	6–1	Ho Chi Minh City
2018	AFC Futsal Club Championship	Group Stage	(South Korea)	Jeonju MAG	10–1	Yogyakarta
2018	AFC Futsal Club Championship	Group Stage	(Iraq)	Naft Al-Wasat	3–4	Yogyakarta
2018	AFC Futsal Club Championship	Group Stage	(United Arab Emirates)	Al Dhafra	4–3	Yogyakarta
2018	AFC Futsal Club Championship	Quarter-Finals	(Japan)	Nagoya Oceans	3–2 (a.e.t)	Yogyakarta
2018	AFC Futsal Club Championship	Semi-Finals	(Lebanon)	Bank of Beirut	6–5	Yogyakarta
2018	AFC Futsal Club Championship	Final	(Iran)	Mes Sungun	2–4	Yogyakarta
2019	AFC Futsal Club Championship	Group Stage	(Uzbekistan)	AGMK	4–1	Bangkok
2019	AFC Futsal Club Championship	Group Stage	(Qatar)	Al Rayyan	5–1	Bangkok
2019	AFC Futsal Club Championship	Group Stage	(Iraq)	Naft Al-Wasat	6–4	Bangkok
2019	AFC Futsal Club Championship	Quarter-Finals	(China)	Shenzhen Nanling	5–1	Bangkok
2019	AFC Futsal Club Championship	Semi-Finals	(Japan)	Nagoya Oceans	1–3	Bangkok
2019	AFC Futsal Club Championship	Third-Place	(Uzbekistan)	AGMK	6–4	Bangkok
2023	AFF Futsal Club Championship	Group Stage	(Indonesia)	Black Steel Papua	1–4	Nakhon Ratchasima
2023	AFF Futsal Club Championship	Group Stage	(Australia)	Football Victoria	3–1	Nakhon Ratchasima
2023	AFF Futsal Club Championship	Third-Place	(Malaysia)	Pahang Rangers	3–0	Nakhon Ratchasima

== Leadership and Coaches ==
Vị trí	Họ tên
President	(Vietnam) Trần Anh Tú
Vice-president	(Vietnam) Trần Long Vũ
Managing Director	(Vietnam) Quốc Khánh Trần
Technical director	(Vietnam) Ngô Lê Bằng
Vice Technical Director	(Vietnam) Nguyễn Bảo Trung
Assistant to President	(Vietnam) Nguyễn Thiên Phong
Head coach	(Argentina) Nicolas Gustavo
Assistant coach	(Vietnam) Trần Anh Vũ
Assistant coach	(Vietnam) Huỳnh Tấn Quốc
Goalkeeping coach	(Spain) Antonio Garcia Jimenez
Physical Assistant	(Spain) Miguel Ledesma Carrasco
Technical staff	(Vietnam) Nguyễn Thành Nguyên
Medical staff	(Vietnam) Nguyễn Văn Nu

== Current squad ==
Note: Flags indicate national team as defined under FIFA eligibility rules; some limited exceptions apply. Players may hold more than one non-FIFA nationality.

No.	Pos.	Nation	Player
1	GK	VIE	Hồ Văn Ý
2	GK	VIE	Châu Thạch Khánh Cường
3	MF	VIE	Lê Quốc Nam
4	DF	VIE	Vũ Xuân Du
5	DF	VIE	Nguyễn Mạnh Dũng
6	MF	VIE	Phạm Đức Hòa
7	MF	VIE	Nguyễn Anh Duy
8	FW	VIE	Nguyễn Minh Trí
9	MF	VIE	Trần Thái Huy
10	FW	VIE	Đặng Anh Tài
11	DF	VIE	Trần Văn Vũ (Captain)
12	MF	VIE	Dương Ngọc Linh

No.	Pos.	Nation	Player
13	DF	VIE	Nhan Gia Hưng
14	MF	VIE	Tôn Thất Phi
15	MF	VIE	Cổ Trí Kiệt
16	MF	VIE	Đặng Phi Tiến
17	MF	VIE	Lý Đăng Hưng
18	FW	VIE	Nguyễn Huỳnh Thanh Huy
19	MF	VIE	Châu Đoàn Phát
20	FW	VIE	Nguyễn Thịnh Phát
23	GK	VIE	Nguyễn Tăng Đình
24	GK	VIE	Vương Nguyễn Thuận
25	FW	FIN	Aleksi Pirttijoki

== Notable players ==
Brasil

- (Brazil) Baptista

Equatorial Guinea

- (Equatorial Guinea) Roberto Tobe

Finland

- (Finland) Aleksi Porttijoki

Iran

- (Iran) Hossein Tayyebi
- (Iran) Alireza Rafieipour
- (Iran) Abolghasem Orouji

Japan

- (Japan) Kazuya Shimizu

Kuwait

- (Kuwait) Abdulrahman Al-Tawail

Spain

- (Spain) Sául Olmo

Uzbekistan

- (Uzbekistan) Artur Yunusov
