= Tân Hiệp Hưng Futsal Club =

Tân Hiệp Hưng
- Full name: Tan Hiep Hung Futsal Club
- Founded: 2008; 17 years ago
- Ground: Lãnh Binh Thăng Arena
- Capacity: 2,000
- Chairman: Nguyễn Minh Thắng
- Manager: Trương Quốc Tuấn
- League: Vietnam Futsal League
- 2022: 5th

Tân Hiệp Hưng Futsal Club (Vietnamese: câu lạc bộ futsal Tân Hiệp Hưng) is a Viet futsal club. They currently play in the Vietnam National Futsal League.

They hired coach Trương Hồng Tài for the 2019 season, but he was replaced by Trần Hoàng Vinh after a year.

== Current squad ==
Note: Flags indicate national team as defined under FIFA eligibility rules; some limited exceptions apply. Players may hold more than one non-FIFA nationality.

No.	Pos.	Nation	Player
1	GK	(Vietnam) VIE	Huỳnh Văn Lê Hậu
3	DF	(Vietnam) VIE	Trương Quốc Dũng
6	DF	(Vietnam) VIE	Nguyễn Phước Quý Sang
7	MF	(Vietnam) VIE	Trần Quang Vinh
8	FW	(Vietnam) VIE	Huỳnh Quốc Tâm
9	FW	(Vietnam) VIE	Nguyễn Đắc Huy
12	MF	(Vietnam) VIE	Trần Thái Huy
14	FW	(Vietnam) VIE	Đặng Anh Tài

No.	Pos.	Nation	Player
17	DF	(Vietnam) VIE	Trần Minh Hoàng
18	MF	(Vietnam) VIE	Nguyễn Trọng Sơn
20	DF	(Vietnam) VIE	Lê Tuấn Kiệt
22	MF	(Vietnam) VIE	Nguyễn Thanh Phương
24	DF	(Vietnam) VIE	Trần Ngọc Minh Khoa
25	GK	(Vietnam) VIE	Ngô Đình Thuận
27	MF	(Vietnam) VIE	Hoàng Mạnh Cường
