= 2012 FIFA Futsal World Cup squads =

This article lists the confirmed national futsal squads for the 2012 FIFA Futsal World Cup tournament held in Thailand, between November 1 and November 18, 2012.

== Group A ==
=== Thailand ===
Head coach: (Netherlands) Victor Hermans

No.	Pos.	Player	Date of birth (age)	Caps	Club
1	GK	Prakit Dankhuntod	30 December 1983 (aged 28)		(Thailand) Thai Port
2	DF	Konghla Lakka	10 May 1986 (aged 26)		(Thailand) Surat Thani
3	DF	Natee Jeepon	28 October 1986 (aged 26)		(Thailand) Lampang United
4	DF	Piyapan Rattana	16 July 1985 (aged 27)		(Thailand) Thai Port
5	DF	Jirawat Sornwichian	25 October 1988 (aged 24)		(Thailand) Surat Thani
6	MF	Thananchai Chomboon	26 June 1985 (aged 27)		(Thailand) Surat Thani
7	MF	Kritsada Wongkaeo	29 April 1988 (aged 24)		(Thailand) G.H. Bank RBAC
8	FW	Jetsada Chudech	20 February 1989 (aged 23)		(Thailand) Rajnavy
9	FW	Suphawut Thueanklang	14 July 1989 (aged 23)		(Thailand) G.H. Bank RBAC
10	MF	Apiwat Chaemcharoen	31 March 1991 (aged 21)		(Thailand) G.H. Bank RBAC
11	MF	Nattawut Madyalan	12 April 1990 (aged 22)		(Thailand) Thai Port
12	GK	Surapong Tompa	25 November 1978 (aged 33)		(Thailand) Rajnavy
13	FW	Aref Ahamah	15 January 1987 (aged 25)		(Thailand) Thai Port
14	MF	Kiatiyot Chalarmkhet	2 November 1989 (aged 22)		(Thailand) G.H. Bank RBAC

=== Costa Rica ===
Head coach: (Costa Rica) Diego Solis

No.	Pos.	Player	Date of birth (age)	Caps	Club
1	GK	Jairo Toruno	22 November 1983 (aged 28)		(Costa Rica) T Shirt Mundo
2	FW	Adonay Vindas	25 October 1985 (aged 27)		(Costa Rica) Borussia Futsal
3	GK	Justin Wallace	28 May 1985 (aged 27)		(Costa Rica) Barrio Peralta
4	FW	Luís Navarrete	25 August 1991 (aged 21)		(Costa Rica) Municipal Alajuela
5	DF	Edwin Cubillo	23 August 1987 (aged 25)		(Costa Rica) Borussia Futsal
6	FW	Jorge Arias	13 February 1984 (aged 28)		(Costa Rica) T Shirt Mundo
7	DF	Alejandro Paniagua	20 May 1986 (aged 26)		(Costa Rica) Barrio Peralta
8	FW	José Guevara	16 March 1991 (aged 21)		(Costa Rica) Barrio Peralta
9	DF	Marco Carvajal	2 December 1981 (aged 30)		(Costa Rica) Goicoechea - Extremos
10	FW	Michael Córdoba	1 June 1983 (aged 29)		(Costa Rica) Goicoechea - Extremos
11	FW	Aarón Jerez	24 February 1982 (aged 30)		(Costa Rica) Paraiso Futsal
12	FW	Diego Zúñiga	11 July 1990 (aged 22)		(Costa Rica) T Shirt Mundo
13	FW	Erick Brenes	16 December 1989 (age 36)		(Costa Rica) Paraiso Futsal
14	GK	Álvaro Santamaría	1 April 1988 (age 38)		(Costa Rica) Barrio Peralta

=== Paraguay ===
Head coach: (Brazil) Fernando Leite

No.	Pos.	Player	Date of birth (age)	Caps	Club
1	GK	Carlos Espinola	6 April 1981 (aged 31)		(Paraguay) Pablo Rojas Futsal
2	MF	Enmanuel Ayala	3 December 1985 (aged 26)		(Italy) Acqua Claudia
3	DF	Fabio Alcaraz	7 January 1982 (aged 30)		(Italy) Lazio
4	MF	Gabriel Ayala	3 December 1985 (aged 26)		(Italy) Acqua Claudia
5	DF	Jose Luis Santander	10 April 1981 (aged 31)		(Paraguay) Star's Club Futsal
6	MF	Adolfo Salas	22 September 1993 (aged 19)		(Italy) Venezia
7	DF	Oscar Velazquez	26 May 1984 (aged 28)		(Italy) Montesilvano
8	FW	Nelson Lezcano	18 October 1987 (aged 25)		(Paraguay) Villa Hayes Futsal
9	MF	Juan Adrián Salas	20 October 1990 (aged 22)		(Italy) Lazio
10	FW	Walter Villalba	22 October 1977 (aged 35)		(Paraguay) Afemec Futsal
11	GK	Luis Molinas	16 February 1987 (aged 25)		(Paraguay) Cerro Porteño
12	MF	Marcos Benitez	17 February 1985 (aged 27)		(Italy) Pescara
13	GK	Gabriel Gimenez	29 May 1984 (aged 28)		(Paraguay) Star's Club Futsal
14	MF	Rene Villaba	8 July 1981 (aged 31)		(Paraguay) Afemec Futsal

=== Ukraine ===
Head coach: (Ukraine) Gennadiy Lisenchuk

No.	Pos.	Player	Date of birth (age)	Caps	Club
1	GK	Ievgen Ivanyak	28 September 1982 (aged 30)		(Ukraine) Lokomotiv Kharkiv
2	FW	Mykhaylo Romanov	21 July 1983 (aged 29)		(Russia) Politekh St Petersburg
3	DF	Stepan Struk	12 December 1984 (aged 27)		(Ukraine) Energia Lviv
4	MF	Sergiy Zhurba	14 March 1987 (aged 25)		(Ukraine) Lokomotiv Kharkiv
5	FW	Dmytro Sorokin	14 July 1988 (aged 24)		(Ukraine) Lokomotiv Kharkiv
6	MF	Sergiy Cheporkiuk	18 April 1982 (aged 30)		(Ukraine) Energia Lviv
7	DF	Maksym Pavlenko	15 September 1975 (aged 37)		(Ukraine) Energia Lviv
8	FW	Ievgen Rogachov	30 August 1983 (aged 29)		(Ukraine) Energia Lviv
9	MF	Dmytro Fedorchenko	31 May 1986 (aged 26)		(Ukraine) Lokomotiv Kharkiv
10	MF	Petro Shoturma	27 June 1992 (aged 20)		(Ukraine) Uragan Ivano-Frankovsk
11	FW	Denys Ovsiannikov	10 December 1984 (aged 27)		(Ukraine) Energia Lviv
12	GK	Kyrylo Tsypun	30 July 1987 (aged 25)		(Ukraine) Uragan Ivano-Frankovsk
13	DF	Oleksandr Sorokin	13 August 1987 (aged 25)		(Ukraine) Lokomotiv Kharkiv
14	GK	Dmytro Lytvynenko	16 April 1987 (aged 25)		(Ukraine) Lokomotiv Kharkiv

== Group B ==
=== Iran ===
Head coach: (Iran) Ali Sanei

No.	Pos.	Player	Date of birth (age)	Caps	Club
1	GK	Alireza Samimi	29 June 1987 (aged 25)		Melli Haffari Iran
2	DF	Ali Kiaei	20 April 1987 (aged 25)		(Iran) Shahid Mansouri
3	MF	Ali Rahnama	21 May 1985 (aged 27)		(Iran) Shahid Mansouri
4	DF	Mohammad Keshavarz	5 July 1982 (aged 30)		(Iran) Giti Pasand
5	DF	Hamid Ahmadi	24 November 1988 (aged 23)		(Iran) Shahid Mansouri
6	MF	Afshin Kazemi	24 October 1986 (age 39)		(Iran) Giti Pasand
7	MF	Ali Asghar Hassanzadeh	2 November 1987 (aged 24)		(Iran) Saba Qom
8	MF	Mostafa Tayyebi	9 June 1987 (aged 25)		(Iran) Shahid Mansouri
9	FW	Masoud Daneshvar	30 January 1988 (aged 24)		(Iran) Arjan Shiraz
10	FW	Mohammad Taheri	2 May 1985 (aged 27)		(Iran) Shahid Mansouri
11	FW	Hossein Tayyebi	29 September 1988 (aged 24)		(Iran) Giti Pasand
12	GK	Mostafa Nazari	11 December 1982 (aged 29)		(Iran) Dabiri Tabriz
13	MF	Ahmad Esmaeilpour	8 September 1988 (aged 24)		(Iran) Giti Pasand
14	GK	Sepehr Mohammadi	8 August 1989 (aged 23)		(Iran) Giti Pasand

=== Morocco ===
Head coach: (Morocco) Hicham Dguig

No.	Pos.	Player	Date of birth (age)	Caps	Club
1	GK	Rabie Zaari	26 July 1981 (aged 31)		(Morocco) KAC Kenitra
2	FW	Soufiane El Mesrar	5 June 1990 (aged 22)		(Morocco) Dynamo Kenitra
3	MF	Hatim Ouahabi	26 June 1988 (aged 24)		(Morocco) Ajax Tetouan
4	DF	Mohammed Dahou	20 June 1984 (aged 28)		(Morocco) Ajax Tanger
5	MF	Youssef El Mazray	1 July 1987 (aged 25)		(Morocco) Feth Sportif Settat
6	FW	Yahya Baya	23 January 1979 (aged 33)		(Morocco) KAC Kenitra
7	MF	Bilal Assoufi	14 September 1988 (aged 24)		(Morocco) Ajax Tanger
8	FW	Adil Habil	27 May 1982 (aged 30)		(Morocco) KAC Kenitra
9	DF	Mohammed Talibi	19 November 1983 (aged 28)		(Morocco) Jeunesse Khouribga
10	FW	Aziz Derrou	6 June 1986 (aged 26)		(Morocco) KAC Kenitra
11	MF	Anouar Chrayeh	20 July 1985 (aged 27)		(Morocco) Ajax Tanger
12	GK	Adil El Bettachi	6 March 1981 (aged 31)		(Morocco) Jeunesse Khouribga
13	FW	Yahya Jabrane	18 June 1991 (aged 21)		(Morocco) Feth Sportif Settat
14	GK	Younes Kelkaghi	19 September 1985 (aged 27)		(Morocco) Ajax Tanger

=== Panama ===
Head coach: (Cuba) Agustin Campuzano

No.	Pos.	Player	Date of birth (age)	Caps	Club
1	GK	Valencio Parks	28 March 1987 (aged 25)		(Panama) Curundu
2	DF	Miguel Bello	18 September 1981 (aged 31)		(Panama) Perejil
3	MF	Oscar Hinks	20 September 1985 (aged 27)		(Panama) San Martin
4	DF	Augusto Harrison	13 December 1976 (aged 35)		(Panama) San Martin
5	MF	Fernando Mena	8 August 1990 (aged 22)		(Panama) Perejil
6	DF	Edgar Rivas	21 April 1989 (aged 23)		(Panama) Santa Marta
7	MF	Claudio Goodridge	2 January 1990 (aged 22)		(Panama) Santa Marta
8	MF	Carlos Perez	29 August 1986 (aged 26)		(Panama) Perejil
9	FW	Miguel Lasso	3 December 1985 (aged 26)		(Panama) Chorrillo
10	MF	Alquis Alvarado	13 January 1986 (aged 26)		(Panama) San Martin
11	FW	Apolinar Galvez	14 November 1976 (aged 35)		(Panama) Samaria
12	GK	Jaime Londono	18 January 1991 (aged 21)		(Panama) Suntracs
13	MF	Michael De Leon	1 March 1989 (aged 23)		(Panama) San Martin
14	FW	Enrique Valdes	19 August 1982 (aged 30)		(Panama) La Turin

=== Spain ===
Head coach: (Spain) Venancio Lopez

No.	Pos.	Player	Date of birth (age)	Caps	Club
1	GK	Cristián	27 August 1982 (aged 30)		(Spain) FC Barcelona
2	DF	Ortiz	3 October 1983 (aged 29)		(Spain) Inter Movistar
3	DF	Aicardo	4 December 1988 (aged 23)		(Spain) FC Barcelona
4	FW	Torras	24 September 1980 (aged 32)		(Spain) FC Barcelona
5	MF	Fernando	16 August 1980 (aged 32)		(Spain) FC Barcelona
6	FW	Álvaro	29 September 1977 (aged 35)		(Spain) Inter Movistar
7	FW	Miguelín	9 May 1985 (aged 27)		(Spain) ElPozo Murcia
8	DF	Kike	4 May 1978 (aged 34)		(Spain) ElPozo Murcia
9	FW	Sergio Lozano	9 November 1988 (aged 23)		(Spain) FC Barcelona
10	MF	Borja	16 November 1984 (aged 27)		(Italy) Marca Futsal
11	FW	Lin	16 May 1986 (aged 26)		(Spain) FC Barcelona
12	GK	Juanjo	19 August 1985 (aged 27)		(Spain) Inter Movistar
13	GK	Rafa	13 June 1980 (aged 32)		(Spain) ElPozo Murcia
14	FW	Alemao	25 June 1976 (aged 36)		(Russia) MFK Dina Moskva

== Group C ==
=== Brazil ===
Head coach: (Brazil) Marcos Sorato

No.	Pos.	Player	Date of birth (age)	Caps	Club
1	GK	Guitta	11 June 1987 (aged 25)		(Brazil) Intelli/Orlândia
2	GK	Tiago Marinho	9 March 1981 (aged 31)		(Brazil) Krona/Joinville/DalPonte
3	GK	Franklin	18 May 1975 (aged 37)		(Brazil) Corinthians
4	FW	Ari	6 March 1982 (aged 30)		(Spain) FC Barcelona
5	MF	Rafael Rato	16 June 1983 (aged 29)		(Spain) Inter Movistar
6	MF	Gabriel	17 November 1980 (aged 31)		(Spain) FC Barcelona
7	MF	Vinícius	31 December 1977 (aged 34)		(Brazil) Intelli/Orlândia
8	MF	Leandro Simi	29 October 1977 (aged 35)		(Brazil) Corinthians
9	FW	Jé	15 November 1983 (aged 28)		(Brazil) Intelli/Orlândia
10	FW	Fernandinho	1 July 1983 (aged 29)		(Russia) MFK Dinamo Moskva
11	DF	Neto	5 September 1981 (aged 31)		(Brazil) Krona/Joinville/DalPonte
12	MF	Falcão	8 June 1977 (aged 35)		(Brazil) Intelli/Orlândia
13	FW	Wilde	14 April 1981 (aged 31)		(Spain) FC Barcelona
14	DF	Rodrigo Araújo	7 June 1984 (aged 28)		(Brazil) Carlos Barbosa

=== Japan ===
Head coach: (Spain) Miguel Rodrigo

No.	Pos.	Player	Date of birth (age)	Caps	Club
1	GK	Hisamitsu Kawahara	24 November 1978 (aged 33)		(Japan) Nagoya Oceans
2	GK	Jun Fujiwara	23 November 1982 (aged 29)		(Japan) Bardral Urayasu
3	DF	Wataru Kitahara	2 August 1982 (aged 30)		(Japan) Nagoya Oceans
4	DF	Yusuke Komiyama	22 December 1979 (aged 32)		(Japan) Bardral Urayasu
5	DF	Tetsuya Murakami	8 August 1967 (aged 45)		(Japan) Shriker Osaka
6	MF	Nobuya Osodo	28 June 1983 (aged 29)		(Japan) Vasagey Oita
7	FW	Kaoru Morioka	7 April 1979 (aged 33)		(Japan) Nagoya Oceans
8	FW	Kensuke Takahashi	8 May 1982 (aged 30)		(Japan) Bardral Urayasu
9	FW	Shota Hoshi	17 November 1985 (aged 26)		(Japan) Bardral Urayasu
10	MF	Kenichiro Kogure	11 November 1979 (aged 32)		(Japan) Nagoya Oceans
11	FW	Kazuyoshi Miura	26 February 1967 (aged 45)		(Japan) Yokohama FC
12	GK	Toru Fukimbara	18 October 1982 (aged 30)		(Japan) Deução Kobe
13	MF	Rafael Henmi	30 July 1992 (aged 20)		(Japan) Nagoya Oceans
14	MF	Kotaro Inaba	22 December 1982 (aged 29)		(Japan) Bardral Urayasu

=== Libya ===
Head coach: (Spain) Pablo Prieto

No.	Pos.	Player	Date of birth (age)	Caps	Club
1	GK	Yousef Bensaed	31 October 1983 (aged 29)		(Libya) Adhahra
2	DF	Ahmed Faraj	22 December 1987 (aged 24)		(Libya) Al Amen
3	FW	Bader Hasan	1 October 1987 (aged 25)		(Libya) Al Jazera Sabha
4	DF	Mohamed Rageb	12 October 1987 (aged 25)		(Libya) Al Ittihad Tripoli
5	FW	Abdusalam Sherad	20 November 1990 (aged 21)		(Libya) Al Ittihad Tripoli
6	FW	Rabie Abdel	19 June 1985 (aged 27)		No club affiliation
7	FW	Reda Fathe	20 January 1986 (aged 26)		(Libya) Al Ahli Benghazi
8	MF	Husam Al Wahishi	28 July 1986 (aged 26)		(Libya) Al Ahli Benghazi
9	FW	Ahmed Fathe	18 December 1987 (aged 24)		(Libya) Al Ahli Benghazi
10	DF	Mohamed Rahoma	5 May 1984 (aged 28)		No club affiliation
11	MF	Younis Shames	11 June 1991 (aged 21)		(Libya) Al Tersana
12	GK	Ramzi Al Sharif	28 November 1988 (aged 23)		(Libya) Al Ahli Benghazi
13	FW	Salem Aghila	24 December 1989 (aged 22)		(Libya) Al Khutut
14	GK	Husam Altumi	28 December 1990 (aged 21)		(Libya) Adhahra

=== Portugal ===
Head coach: (Portugal) Jorge Braz

No.	Pos.	Player	Date of birth (age)	Caps	Club
1	GK	João Benedito	7 October 1978 (aged 34)		(Portugal) Sporting CP
2	FW	Paulinho	12 March 1983 (aged 29)		(Portugal) Sporting CP
3	FW	Fernando Leitão	3 January 1981 (aged 31)		(Portugal) Sporting CP
4	FW	Pedro Cary	10 May 1984 (aged 28)		(Portugal) Sporting CP
5	MF	Nandinho	18 December 1982 (aged 29)		(Portugal) Modicus - Sandim
6	MF	Arnaldo Pereira	16 June 1979 (aged 33)		(Latvia) FK Nikars Riga
7	FW	Fernando Cardinal	26 June 1985 (aged 27)		(Portugal) Rio Ave
8	MF	Djô	11 January 1988 (aged 24)		(Portugal) Sporting CP
9	DF	Gonçalo Alves	1 July 1977 (aged 35)		(Portugal) SL Benfica
10	MF	Ricardinho	3 September 1985 (aged 27)		(Japan) Nagoya Oceans
11	DF	João Matos	21 February 1987 (aged 25)		(Portugal) Sporting CP
12	GK	Bebé	19 May 1983 (aged 29)		(Portugal) SL Benfica
13	MF	Marinho	30 March 1985 (aged 27)		(Portugal) SL Benfica
14	GK	André Sousa	25 February 1986 (aged 26)		(Portugal) Operário

== Group D ==
=== Argentina ===
Head coach: (Spain) Fernando Larrañaga

No.	Pos.	Player	Date of birth (age)	Caps	Club
1	GK	Santiago Elías	2 February 1983 (aged 29)		(Argentina) Pinocho
2	DF	Damian Stazzone	31 January 1986 (aged 26)		(Italy) Latina
3	MF	Matías Lucuix	20 November 1985 (aged 26)		(Spain) Inter Movistar
4	DF	Pablo Belsito	29 March 1986 (aged 26)		(Italy) Gruppo Fassina
5	MF	Pablo Taborda	3 September 1986 (aged 26)		(Argentina) Boca Juniors
6	MF	Maximiliano Rescia	29 October 1987 (aged 25)		(Italy) Futsal Samb
7	MF	Leandro Cuzzolino	21 May 1987 (aged 25)		(Italy) Montesilvano
8	MF	Hernan Garcias	2 June 1978 (aged 34)		(Italy) Asti
9	FW	Cristian Borruto	7 May 1987 (aged 25)		(Italy) Montesilvano
10	FW	Martin Amas	25 October 1984 (aged 28)		(Spain) Manacor
11	MF	Pablo Basile	25 July 1988 (aged 24)		(Argentina) Boca Juniors
12	GK	Matias Quevedo	11 March 1984 (aged 28)		(Argentina) Ferro Carril Oeste
13	FW	Alamiro Vaporaki	1 December 1983 (aged 28)		(Argentina) Boca Juniors
14	FW	Alan Calo	6 April 1987 (aged 25)		(Argentina) Pinocho

=== Australia ===
Head coach: (Australia) Steven Knight

No.	Pos.	Player	Date of birth (age)	Caps	Club
1	GK	Peter Spathis	9 April 1981 (aged 31)		(Australia) East Coast Heat
2	DF	Aaron Cimitile	8 April 1991 (aged 21)		(Australia) East Coast Heat
3	DF	Jarrod Basger	9 February 1991 (aged 21)		(Australia) Maccabi Hakoah
4	MF	Gregory Giovenali	14 August 1987 (aged 25)		(Australia) Dural Warriors
5	DF	Nathan Niski	24 May 1993 (aged 19)		(Australia) Dural Warriors
6	FW	Daniel Fogarty	10 January 1991 (aged 21)		(Australia) West City Crusaders
7	DF	Tobias Seeto	26 March 1988 (aged 24)		(Australia) Dural Warriors
8	FW	Fernando	21 January 1980 (aged 32)		(Australia) Victoria Vipers
9	FW	Chris Zeballos	16 June 1986 (aged 26)		(Australia) East Coast Heat
10	FW	Lachlan Wright	6 February 1981 (aged 31)		(Australia) Enfield Rovers
11	MF	Danny Ngaluafe	18 June 1987 (aged 25)		No club affiliation
12	GK	Gavin O Brien	30 September 1977 (aged 35)		(Australia) Campbelltown City Quake
13	GK	Angelo Konstantinou	8 November 1978 (aged 33)		(Australia) Boomerangs
14	MF	Keenan Duimpies	12 December 1989 (aged 22)		No club affiliation

=== Italy ===
Head coach: (Italy) Roberto Menichelli

No.	Pos.	Player	Date of birth (age)	Caps	Club
1	GK	Stefano Mammarella	2 February 1984 (aged 28)		(Italy) Montesilvano
2	DF	Marco Ercolessi	15 May 1986 (aged 26)		(Italy) Marca Futsal
3	DF	Marcio Forte	23 April 1977 (aged 35)		(Italy) Lazio
4	DF	Sergio Romano	28 September 1987 (aged 25)		(Italy) Cogianco Genzano
5	DF	Luca Leggiero	11 November 1984 (aged 27)		(Italy) Sport Five
6	FW	Humberto Honorio	21 July 1983 (aged 29)		(Italy) Luparense
7	FW	Giuseppe Mentasti	6 June 1991 (aged 21)		(Italy) Cogianco Genzano
8	FW	Rodolfo Fortino	30 April 1983 (aged 29)		(Italy) Luparense
9	FW	Alex Merlim	15 July 1986 (aged 26)		(Italy) Luparense
10	FW	Jairo Dos Santos	18 July 1984 (aged 28)		(Italy) Asti
11	DF	Saad Assis	26 October 1979 (aged 33)		(Spain) FC Barcelona
12	GK	Valerio Barigelli	19 October 1982 (aged 30)		(Italy) Lazio
13	DF	Gabriel Lima	19 August 1987 (aged 25)		(Italy) Asti
14	GK	Michele Miarelli	29 April 1984 (aged 28)		(Italy) Cogianco Genzano

=== Mexico ===
Head coach: (Mexico) Ramon Raya

No.	Pos.	Player	Date of birth (age)	Caps	Club
1	GK	Alonso Saavedra	8 November 1980 (aged 31)		No club affiliation
2	MF	Angel Rodriguez	21 February 1985 (aged 27)		No club affiliation
3	DF	Benjamin Mosco	2 September 1985 (aged 27)		No club affiliation
4	DF	Francisco Cati	18 December 1981 (aged 30)		No club affiliation
5	DF	Adrian Gonzalez	21 March 1986 (aged 26)		No club affiliation
6	MF	Miguel Limon	6 August 1985 (aged 27)		No club affiliation
7	MF	Jorge Rodriguez	4 May 1983 (aged 29)		No club affiliation
8	MF	Victor Quiroz	8 September 1976 (aged 36)		(United States) Wichita Wings
9	FW	Carlos Ramirez (futsal player)	6 November 1976 (aged 35)		No club affiliation
10	MF	Gustavo Rosales	26 February 1981 (aged 31)		No club affiliation
11	MF	Morgan Plata	11 December 1981 (aged 30)		No club affiliation
12	GK	Miguel Estrada	11 July 1983 (aged 29)		No club affiliation
13	MF	Jorge Quiroz	29 September 1981 (aged 31)		No club affiliation
14	FW	Omar Cervantes	27 September 1985 (aged 27)		No club affiliation

== Group E ==
=== Czech Republic ===
Head coach: (Czech Republic) Tomáš Neumann

No.	Pos.	Player	Date of birth (age)	Caps	Club
1	GK	Jakub Zdánský	28 May 1986 (aged 26)		(Czech Republic) Era-Pack Chrudim
2	FW	Tomáš Koudelka	23 November 1990 (aged 21)		(Czech Republic) Era-Pack Chrudim
3	DF	David Cupák	27 May 1989 (aged 23)		(Czech Republic) Helas Brno
4	FW	Matěj Slováček	8 October 1990 (aged 22)		(Czech Republic) Era-Pack Chrudim
5	DF	Michal Kovács	17 April 1990 (aged 22)		(Czech Republic) Tango Brno
6	FW	Jiří Novotný	12 July 1988 (aged 24)		(Czech Republic) Bohemians 1905
7	FW	Lukáš Rešetár	28 April 1984 (aged 28)		(Czech Republic) Era-Pack Chrudim
8	FW	Marek Kopecký	19 February 1977 (aged 35)		(Czech Republic) Era-Pack Chrudim
9	DF	David Frič	17 February 1983 (aged 29)		(Czech Republic) Bohemians 1905
10	FW	Michal Seidler	5 April 1990 (aged 22)		(Czech Republic) Tango Brno
11	FW	Michal Belej	16 November 1982 (aged 29)		(Czech Republic) Tango Brno
12	GK	Libor Gerčák	22 July 1975 (aged 37)		(Czech Republic) Vysoké Mýto
13	FW	Zdeněk Sláma	28 December 1982 (aged 29)		(Czech Republic) Bohemians 1905
14	FW	Jan Janovský	20 June 1985 (aged 27)		(Poland) Rekord Bielsko-Biala

=== Egypt ===
Head coach: (Egypt) Badr Khalil

No.	Pos.	Player	Date of birth (age)	Caps	Club
1	GK	Hema	28 May 1975 (aged 37)		(Egypt) El Shams
2	DF	Ahmed El-Agouz	21 May 1978 (aged 34)		(Egypt) El Shams
3	MF	Eslam Shalaby	1 December 1989 (aged 22)		(Egypt) Misr El Makasa
4	DF	Mohamed Edrees	6 January 1981 (aged 31)		(Egypt) Police
5	DF	Bougy	18 March 1987 (aged 25)		(Egypt) El Shams
6	MF	Mostafa Nader	14 October 1984 (aged 28)		(Egypt) Police
7	DF	Ahmed Abou Serie	30 October 1979 (aged 33)		(Egypt) Mit Oqba
8	FW	Mizo	15 October 1985 (aged 27)		(Egypt) El Shams
9	FW	Ramadan Samasry	11 July 1982 (aged 30)		(Egypt) El Shams
10	FW	Islam El Darwj	3 August 1983 (aged 29)		(Egypt) Police
11	FW	Ahmed Hussein	1 February 1984 (aged 28)		(Egypt) Arab Contractors
12	GK	Hussein Gharib	4 March 1978 (aged 34)		(Egypt) Misr El Makasa
13	DF	Islam Gamila	1 January 1988 (aged 24)		(Egypt) EL Behira Electric
14	FW	Ahmed Mohamed	16 August 1982 (aged 30)		(Egypt) Misr El Makasa

=== Kuwait ===
Head coach: (Spain) Luis Fonseca

No.	Pos.	Player	Date of birth (age)	Caps	Club
1	GK	Abdullah Hayah	19 December 1986 (aged 25)		Al Kuwait
2	DF	Mohammed Albedaih	22 August 1989 (aged 23)		(Kuwait) Al Salmiya
3	DF	Abdulrahman Almosabehi	13 June 1989 (aged 23)		(Kuwait) Al Arabi
4	FW	Ahmad Alfarsi	30 October 1989 (aged 23)		(Kuwait) Kazma
5	DF	Hayat Hamad	24 December 1986 (aged 25)		(Kuwait) Al Yarmouk
6	FW	Abdulrahman Alwadi	9 October 1986 (aged 26)		(Kuwait) Qadsia
7	FW	Abdulrahman Altawail	3 February 1991 (aged 21)		Al Kuwait
8	DF	Aman Salem	30 November 1981 (aged 30)		(Kuwait) Khitan
9	FW	Ali Albutai	9 June 1983 (aged 29)		(Kuwait) Qadsia
10	FW	Shaker Almutairi	18 April 1986 (aged 26)		(Kuwait) Fehayheel
11	DF	Abdullah Dabi	30 June 1988 (aged 24)		(Kuwait) Qadsia
12	DF	Hamad Al Awadhi	9 February 1989 (aged 23)		(Kuwait) Al Yarmouk
13	GK	Hani Mhsien	4 April 1989 (aged 23)		(Kuwait) Kazma
14	FW	Mohammad Mohammad	25 May 1989 (aged 23)		(Kuwait) Al Salmiya

=== Serbia ===
Head coach: (Serbia) Aca Kovačević

No.	Pos.	Player	Date of birth (age)	Caps	Club
1	GK	Miodrag Aksentijević	22 July 1983 (aged 29)		(Serbia) KMF Ekonomac Kragujevac
2	FW	Stefan Rakić	22 November 1993 (aged 18)		(Serbia) KMF Ekonomac Kragujevac
3	DF	Aleksandar Živanović	24 July 1988 (aged 24)		(Serbia) KMF Marbo Intermezzo
4	DF	Vladimir Milosavac	1 December 1985 (aged 26)		(Serbia) KMF Marbo Intermezzo
5	DF	Bojan Pavićević	20 October 1975 (aged 37)		(Serbia) KMF Marbo Intermezzo
6	FW	Boris Čizmar	28 August 1984 (aged 28)		(Serbia) KMF Marbo Intermezzo
7	FW	Slobodan Janjić	17 February 1987 (aged 25)		(Serbia) KMF Ekonomac Kragujevac
8	FW	Marko Pršić	13 September 1990 (aged 22)		(Serbia) KMF Marbo Intermezzo
9	FW	Vladimir Lazić	19 June 1984 (aged 28)		(Serbia) KMF Bečej
10	FW	Mladen Kocić	22 October 1988 (aged 24)		(Serbia) KMF Ekonomac Kragujevac
11	DF	Dragan Dordević	27 April 1984 (aged 28)		(Serbia) Futsal Klub Smederevo
12	GK	Aleksa Antonić	19 June 1981 (aged 31)		(Serbia) KMF Marbo Intermezzo
13	DF	Vidan Bojović	27 June 1979 (aged 33)		(Serbia) KMF Ekonomac Kragujevac
14	FW	Slobodan Rajčević	28 February 1985 (aged 27)		(Serbia) KMF Ekonomac Kragujevac

== Group F ==
=== Colombia ===
Head coach: (Colombia) Arney Fonnegra

No.	Pos.	Player	Date of birth (age)	Caps	Club
1	GK	Juan Lozano	17 September 1982 (aged 30)		(Colombia) Deportivo D'Martin
2	DF	Johann Prado	16 October 1984 (aged 28)		(Colombia) Deportivo Lyon
3	FW	Luis Barreneche	13 January 1986 (aged 26)		(Colombia) Talento Dorado
4	MF	Yefri Duque	24 March 1992 (aged 20)		(Colombia) Deportivo Meta
5	DF	Jose Quiroz	11 October 1985 (aged 27)		(Colombia) Barranquilla Futsal
6	FW	Miguel Sierra	13 April 1983 (aged 29)		(Venezuela) Caracas Futsal
7	MF	Jhonathan Toro	21 March 1988 (aged 24)		(Venezuela) Deportivo Tachira
8	DF	Jorge Abril	26 July 1987 (aged 25)		(Venezuela) Caracas Futsal
9	MF	Andres Reyes	24 November 1988 (aged 23)		(Venezuela) Deportivo Tachira
10	MF	Angellott Caro	3 December 1988 (aged 23)		(Venezuela) Trujillanos Futsal
11	MF	Alejandro Serna	10 September 1986 (aged 26)		(Colombia) Manizales Lineal
12	GK	Carlos Nanez	15 December 1984 (aged 27)		(Colombia) Deportivo Lyon
13	FW	Diego Barney	25 August 1993 (aged 19)		(Colombia) Deportivo Meta
14	MF	Yeisson Fonnegra	19 April 1992 (aged 20)		(Colombia) Talento Dorado

=== Guatemala ===
Head coach: (Guatemala) Carlos Estrada

No.	Pos.	Player	Date of birth (age)	Caps	Club
1	GK	Carlos Mérida	27 March 1978 (aged 34)		(Guatemala) Farmaceuticos
2	MF	Manuel Aristondo	26 February 1982 (aged 30)		(Guatemala) Glucosoral
3	DF	Miguel Santizo	17 May 1985 (aged 27)		(Guatemala) Aquasistemas
4	DF	José González	10 December 1986 (aged 25)		(Guatemala) Glucosoral
5	DF	Edgar Santizo	2 February 1987 (aged 25)		(Guatemala) Aquasistemas
6	FW	Daniel Tejada	22 November 1986 (aged 25)		(Guatemala) Glucosoral
7	FW	Billy Pineda	7 October 1986 (aged 26)		(Guatemala) Glucosoral
8	MF	Armando Escobar	29 March 1991 (aged 21)		(Guatemala) Aquasistemas
9	FW	Walter Enriquez	13 March 1988 (aged 24)		(Guatemala) Aquasistemas
10	FW	Erick Acevedo	20 September 1980 (aged 32)		(Guatemala) Glucosoral
11	FW	Alan Aguilar	2 December 1989 (aged 22)		(Guatemala) Glucosoral
12	GK	William Ramírez	2 February 1980 (aged 32)		(Guatemala) Glucosoral
13	DF	Estuardo de León	6 July 1977 (aged 35)		(Guatemala) Glucosoral
14	FW	Edgar Macal	5 December 1990 (aged 21)		(Guatemala) Deport

=== Russia ===
Head coach: (Russia) Sergey Skorovich

No.	Pos.	Player	Date of birth (age)	Caps	Club
1	GK	Leonid Klimovskiy	22 March 1983 (aged 29)		(Russia) Sibiryak Novosibirsk
2	FW	Vladislav Shayakhmetov	25 August 1981 (aged 31)		(Russia) MFK Dinamo Moskva
3	DF	Nikolay Pereverzev	15 December 1986 (aged 25)		(Russia) MFK Tyumen
4	FW	Dmitri Prudnikov	6 January 1988 (aged 24)		(Russia) MFK Viz-Sinara Yekaterinburg
5	MF	Sergey Sergeev	28 June 1983 (aged 29)		(Russia) MFK Dinamo Moskva
6	MF	Pavel Suchilin	18 October 1985 (aged 27)		(Russia) MFK Dinamo Moskva
7	FW	Pula	2 December 1980 (aged 31)		(Russia) MFK Dinamo Moskva
8	FW	Eder Lima	29 June 1984 (aged 28)		(Russia) Gazprom UGRA
9	DF	Pavel Chistopolov	15 March 1984 (aged 28)		(Russia) Gazprom UGRA
10	FW	Robinho	28 January 1983 (aged 29)		(Russia) Gazprom UGRA
11	DF	Cirilo	20 January 1980 (aged 32)		(Russia) MFK Dinamo Moskva
12	GK	Gustavo	5 February 1979 (aged 33)		(Russia) MFK Dinamo Moskva
13	FW	Aleksandr Fukin	26 March 1985 (aged 27)		(Russia) MFK Dinamo Moskva
14	MF	Ivan Milovanov	8 February 1989 (aged 23)		(Russia) MFK Tyumen

=== Solomon Islands ===
Head coach: (Solomon Islands) Dickson Kadau

No.	Pos.	Player	Date of birth (age)	Caps	Club
1	GK	Anthony Talo	8 January 1996 (aged 16)		(Solomon Islands) Central Kings
2	MF	Paul Huia	1 March 1983 (aged 29)		(Solomon Islands) Brisolona FC
3	DF	Elliot Ragomo	28 May 1990 (aged 22)		(Solomon Islands) Brisolona FC
4	DF	George Stevenson	7 February 1992 (aged 20)		(Solomon Islands) G. Camp United
5	DF	Stanley Puairana	24 August 1990 (aged 22)		(Solomon Islands) Brisolona FC
6	FW	Moffat Sikwaae	30 June 1990 (aged 22)		(Solomon Islands) Makuru
7	FW	James Egeta	10 August 1990 (aged 22)		(Solomon Islands) Marist Fire FC
8	MF	Jeffery Bule	15 November 1991 (aged 20)		(Solomon Islands) Koloale FC Honiara
9	FW	Micah Lea'alafa	1 June 1991 (aged 21)		(Solomon Islands) Kossa FC
10	FW	Samuel Osifelo	15 March 1991 (aged 21)		(Solomon Islands) Kossa FC
11	FW	Coleman Makau	25 November 1992 (aged 19)		(Solomon Islands) Boks FC
13	DF	Mathias Saru	5 February 1991 (aged 21)		(Solomon Islands) Real Kakamora
14	FW	Dickson Ramo	14 July 1990 (aged 22)		(Solomon Islands) Koloale FC Honiara
