= 2012 AFC Futsal Championship =

بطولة آسيا لكرة الصالات 2012

Tournament details
- Host country: United Arab Emirates
- Dates: 25 May – 1 June
- Teams: 16 (from 1 confederation)
- Venue: 2 (in 1 host city)

Final positions
- Champions: Japan (2nd title)
- Runners-up: Thailand
- Third place: Iran
- Fourth place: Australia

Tournament statistics
- Matches played: 32
- Goals scored: 198 (6.19 per match)
- Attendance: 9,077 (284 per match)
- Top scorer: (Iran) Vahid Shamsaei (7 goals)
- Best player: (Japan) Rafael Henmi

The 2012 AFC Futsal Championship was held in United Arab Emirates from 25 May to 1 June 2012. 16 countries took part in the 12th edition of the tournament. It was also the qualification event for the 2012 FIFA Futsal World Cup to be held in Thailand. The AFC Futsal Committee pushed the dates for the event forward from the original 18 to 25 May.

In its first meeting for the 2011-2015 term under the chairmanship of Guam's Richard Lai, the AFC Futsal Committee decided to award the championship to United Arab Emirates.

== Venues ==
Dubai
Al-Wasl Stadium	Al-Shabab Stadium
Capacity: Unknown	Capacity: Unknown

== Draw ==
The draw for the tournament was held on 11 March 2012 in United Arab Emirates.

Pot 1	Pot 2	Pot 3	Pot 4
United Arab Emirates; Iran; Uzbekistan; Japan	China; Thailand; Lebanon; Australia	Kyrgyzstan; Indonesia; Tajikistan; South Korea	Turkmenistan; Chinese Taipei; Kuwait; Qatar

== Group stage ==
=== Group A ===
Team	Pld	W	D	L	GF	GA	GD	Pts
Thailand	3	3	0	0	11	3	+8	9
Kyrgyzstan	3	2	0	1	5	4	+1	6
United Arab Emirates	3	1	0	2	6	8	−2	3
Turkmenistan	3	0	0	3	3	10	−7	0

25 May 2012
18:00

United Arab Emirates	3–1	Turkmenistan
Banihammad 5'; Ibrahim 35'; Jamil 40'	Report	M. Atayev 20'

Al-Wasl Stadium, Dubai
Attendance: 150
Referee: Alireza Sohrabi (Iran)

25 May 2012
20:30

Thailand	2–0	Kyrgyzstan
Chaemcharoen 33'; Ahamah 39'	Report

Al-Wasl Stadium, Dubai
Attendance: 150
Referee: Kim Jang-kwan (South Korea)

26 May 2012
17:30

Turkmenistan	1–5	Thailand
V. Atayev 4'	Report	Thueanklang 3', 9'; Chaemcharoen 6'; Lakka 36'; Wongkaeo 39'

Al-Wasl Stadium, Dubai
Attendance: 160
Referee: Scott Kidson (Australia)

26 May 2012
20:00

Kyrgyzstan	3–1	United Arab Emirates
Ermekov 22'; A. Abdulla 32' (o.g.); Kanetov 35'	Report	T. Abdulla 37'

Al-Wasl Stadium, Dubai
Attendance: 100
Referee: Timo Onatsu (Finland)

27 May 2012
20:00

United Arab Emirates	2–4	Thailand
Jamil 1', 40'	Report	Chaemcharoen 5'; Sornwichian 10'; Wongkaeo 17'; Thueanklang 38'

Al-Wasl Stadium, Dubai
Attendance: 250
Referee: Husein Khalaileh (Jordan)

27 May 2012
20:00

Kyrgyzstan	2–1	Turkmenistan
Djetybaev 15'; Kondratkov 17'	Report	Rahimov 37'

Al-Shabab Stadium, Dubai
Attendance: 150
Referee: Naoki Miyatani (Japan)

=== Group B ===
Team	Pld	W	D	L	GF	GA	GD	Pts
Japan	3	3	0	0	15	4	+11	9
Lebanon	3	2	0	1	7	6	+1	6
Tajikistan	3	1	0	2	8	12	−4	3
Chinese Taipei	3	0	0	3	7	15	−8	0

25 May 2012
12:00

Japan	3–2	Lebanon
Kitahara 4'; Hoshi 4'; Henmi 40'	Report	Abou-Zeid 5'; Kawsan 34'

Al-Wasl Stadium, Dubai
Attendance: 200
Referee: Christopher Colley (Australia)

25 May 2012
14:30

Chinese Taipei	4–6	Tajikistan
Liu Chi-chao 4'; Chen Po-hao 11'; Chang Han 17', 23'	Report	Nazarov 22'; Jumaev 25'; Dodkhudoev 34'; Yang Chao-hsun 35' (o.g.); Ulmasov 40', 40'

Al-Wasl Stadium, Dubai
Attendance: 96
Referee: Nurdin Bukuev (Kyrgyzstan)

26 May 2012
12:00

Lebanon	3–2	Chinese Taipei
Takaji 3', 25'; Kawsan 6'	Report	Pan Wen-chieh 15'; Liu Chi-chao 17'

Al-Wasl Stadium, Dubai
Attendance: 150
Referee: Mohammad Al-Haddad (Kuwait)

26 May 2012
14:30

Tajikistan	1–6	Japan
Mamedbabaev 5'	Report	Komiyama 1'; Murakami 4', 11'; Inaba 9', 25'; Henmi 37'

Al-Wasl Stadium, Dubai
Attendance: 100
Referee: Vahid Arzpeima (Iran)

27 May 2012
12:00

Japan	6–1	Chinese Taipei
Henmi 11', 21'; Komiyama 28'; Kogure 31', 33'; Murakami 35'	Report	Lo Chih-an 6'

Al-Wasl Stadium, Dubai
Attendance: 80
Referee: Kim Jang-kwan (South Korea)

27 May 2012
12:00

Tajikistan	1–2	Lebanon
Mamedbabaev 9'	Report	Takaji 1'; Atwi 30'

Al-Shabab Stadium, Dubai
Attendance: 91
Referee: Rey Ritaga (Philippines)

=== Group C ===
Team	Pld	W	D	L	GF	GA	GD	Pts
Iran	3	3	0	0	31	1	+30	9
Australia	3	2	0	1	9	10	−1	6
Qatar	3	1	0	2	7	14	−7	3
South Korea	3	0	0	3	4	26	−22	0

25 May 2012
18:00

Australia	3–1	Qatar
Zeballos 4', 29'; Gomez 39'	Report	Yousuf 38'

Al-Shabab Stadium, Dubai
Attendance: 250
Referee: Marc Birkett (England)

25 May 2012
20:30

Iran	14–1	South Korea
Esmaeilpour 7'; Taheri 11'; Hassanzadeh 11', 12', 33'; Javid 15', 17', 27'; Keshavarz 23', 29'; Asghari 29', 39'; Tayyebi 31'; Jeong Eui-hyun 36' (o.g.)	Report	Seo Dae-yun 30'

Al-Shabab Stadium, Dubai
Attendance: 728
Referee: Mohammad Al-Haddad (Kuwait)

26 May 2012
17:30

South Korea	0–6	Australia
	Report	Fernando 15', 19'; Seeto 22'; Fogarty 25'; Giovenali 33'; Spathis 40'

Al-Shabab Stadium, Dubai
Attendance: 54
Referee: Zhang Youze (China)

26 May 2012
20:00

Qatar	0–8	Iran
	Report	Taheri 1'; Keshavarz 2'; Tayyebi 15', 37'; Ahmadi 18'; Shamsaei 23', 31'; Hassanzadeh 29'

Al-Shabab Stadium, Dubai
Attendance: 300
Referee: Yasukazu Nobumoto (Japan)

27 May 2012
17:30

Iran	9–0	Australia
Taheri 11', 22'; Shamsaei 13', 40'; Hassanzadeh 14', 33'; Bahadori 16'; Tayyebi 29'; Asghari 37'	Report

Al-Wasl Stadium, Dubai
Attendance: 600
Referee: Marc Birkett (England)

27 May 2012
17:30

Qatar	6–3	South Korea
Khalifa 7'; Mohssein 21'; Bilal 24'; Yousuf 29'; Al-Sabah 33'; Mohammed 40'	Report	Mohammed 12' (o.g.); Kim Min-kuk 36'; Kim Jeong-nam 38'

Al-Shabab Stadium, Dubai
Attendance: 56
Referee: Mohamad Chami (Lebanon)

=== Group D ===
Team	Pld	W	D	L	GF	GA	GD	Pts
Kuwait	3	2	1	0	15	4	+11	7
Uzbekistan	3	2	1	0	12	3	+9	7
China	3	1	0	2	6	9	−3	3
Indonesia	3	0	0	3	6	23	−17	0

25 May 2012
12:00

Uzbekistan	1–1	Kuwait
Irsaliev 9'	Report	Sviridov 6' (o.g.)

Al-Shabab Stadium, Dubai
Attendance: 250
Referee: Naoki Miyatani (Japan)

25 May 2012
14:30

Indonesia	2–5	China
Tamimy 20'; Handoyo 35'	Report	Hu Jie 18', 40'; Zhao Liang 26'; Deng Tao 29'; Cong Lin 32'

Al-Shabab Stadium, Dubai
Attendance: 91
Referee: Husein Khalaileh (Jordan)

26 May 2012
12:00

Kuwait	9–3	Indonesia
Al-Wadi 6', 26', 35'; Al-Taweel 10', 13', 24', 33'; S. Al-Mutairi 12'; F. Haidar 36'	Report	Handoyo 3'; Saptaji 28'; Balfas 38'

Al-Shabab Stadium, Dubai
Attendance: 104
Referee: Rey Ritaga (Philippines)

26 May 2012
14:30

China	1–2	Uzbekistan
Hu Jie 4'	Report	Sviridov 19'; Irsaliev 36'

Al-Shabab Stadium, Dubai
Attendance: 200
Referee: Nurdin Bukuev (Kyrgyzstan)

27 May 2012
14:30

Uzbekistan	9–1	Indonesia
Irsaliev 4', 13'; Elibaev 8'; Tajibaev 17', 31'; Abdumavlyanov 21', 37'; Khalmukhamedov 25'; Rakhmatov 40'	Report	Wardhana 13'

Al-Wasl Stadium, Dubai
Attendance: 230
Referee: Alireza Sohrabi (Iran)

27 May 2012
14:30

China	0–5	Kuwait
	Report	Al-Farsi 10', 16', 28'; S. Al-Mutairi 30'; Al-Mosabehi 40'

Al-Shabab Stadium, Dubai
Attendance: 200
Referee: Christopher Colley (Australia)

== Knockout stage ==
Quarter-finals
May 29 – Dubai
Thailand	5
Lebanon	3
May 29 – Dubai
Iran	6
Uzbekistan	3
May 29 – Dubai
Japan	1
Kyrgyzstan	0
May 29 – Dubai
Kuwait	2
Australia (aet)	3

Semi-finals
May 30 – Dubai
Thailand (aet)	5
Iran	4
May 30 – Dubai
Japan	3
Australia	0

Final
June 1 – Dubai
Thailand	1
Japan	6
Third place
June 1 – Dubai
Iran	4
Australia	0

=== Quarter-finals ===
Winners qualified for 2012 FIFA Futsal World Cup. In case Thailand is among those, the best-placed losing team also qualified.

29 May 2012
15:30

Thailand	5–3	Lebanon
Chudech 5'; Thueanklang 8'; Chaemcharoen 20'; Madyalan 30'; Sornwichian 36'	Report	Kawsan 1', 4'; El Homsi 38'

Al-Wasl Stadium, Dubai
Attendance: 350
Referee: Scott Kidson (Australia)

29 May 2012
15:30

Iran	6–3	Uzbekistan
Ahmadi 5', 39'; Esmaeilpour 7'; Hassanzadeh 20'; Taheri 22'; Tayyebi 32'	Report	Tojiboev 22', 28'; Rakhmatov 40'

Al-Shabab Stadium, Dubai
Attendance: 1,038
Referee: Yasukazu Nobumoto (Japan)

29 May 2012
18:30

Japan	1–0	Kyrgyzstan
Henmi 12'	Report

Al-Wasl Stadium, Dubai
Attendance: 260
Referee: Timo Onatsu (Finland)

29 May 2012
18:30

Kuwait	2–3 (a.e.t.)	Australia
S. Al-Mutairi 15'; Al-Awadhi 28'	Report	Fogarty 3', 42'; Ngaluafe 16'

Al-Shabab Stadium, Dubai
Attendance: 250
Referee: Nurdin Bukuev (Kyrgyzstan)

=== Semi-finals ===
30 May 2012
15:30

Thailand	5–4 (a.e.t.)	Iran
Thueanklang 10', 30' (pen.), 50'; Sornwichian 32'; Chaemcharoen 43'	Report	Shamsaei 4', 49'; Tayyebi 7'; Asghari 30'

Al-Wasl Stadium, Dubai
Attendance: 800
Referee: Timo Onatsu (Finland)

30 May 2012
18:30

Japan	3–0	Australia
Kogure 29'; Kitahara 32'; Henmi 40'	Report

Al-Wasl Stadium, Dubai
Attendance: 113
Referee: Mohammad Al-Haddad (Kuwait)

=== Third place play-off ===
1 June 2012
16:00

Iran	4–0	Australia
Asghari 36', 40'; Taheri 37'; Shamsaei 40'	Report

Al-Wasl Stadium, Dubai
Attendance: 600
Referee: Naoki Miyatani (Japan)

=== Final ===
1 June 2012
19:30

Thailand	1–6	Japan
Wongkaeo 11'	Report	Kogure 4'; Kitahara 15'; Inaba 31'; Henmi 34'; Kawahara 37'; Murakami 38'

Al-Wasl Stadium, Dubai
Attendance: 926
Referee: Nurdin Bukuev (Kyrgyzstan)

== Awards ==
AFC Futsal Championship 2012 winners

Japan
2nd title

Hisamitsu Kawahara, Wataru Kitahara, Yusuke Komiyama, Tetsuya Murakami, Nobuya Osodo, Shota Hoshi, Kenichiro Kogure, Kensuke Takahashi, Toru Fukimbara, Kazuhiro Nibuya, Jun Fujiwara, Rafael Henmi, Kotaro Inaba, Manabu Takita
Coach: (Spain) Miguel Rodrigo

- Most Valuable Player
  - (Japan) Rafael Henmi
- Top Scorer
  - (Iran) Vahid Shamsaei (7 goals and 6 assists)
- Fair-Play Award
  - Iran

== Goalscorers ==
7 goals

- (Iran) Ali Asghar Hassanzadeh
- (Iran) Vahid Shamsaei
- (Japan) Rafael Henmi
- (Thailand) Suphawut Thueanklang

6 goals

- (Iran) Javad Asghari Moghaddam
- (Iran) Mohammad Taheri
- (Iran) Hossein Tayyebi

5 goals

- (Thailand) Apiwat Chaemcharoen

4 goals

- (Japan) Kenichiro Kogure
- (Japan) Tetsuya Murakami
- (Kuwait) Abdulrahman Al-Taweel
- (Lebanon) Kassem Kawsan
- (Uzbekistan) Dilshod Irsaliev

3 goals

- (Australia) Daniel Fogarty
- (China) Hu Jie
- (Iran) Hamid Ahmadi
- (Iran) Mehdi Javid
- (Iran) Mohammad Keshavarz
- (Japan) Kotaro Inaba
- (Japan) Wataru Kitahara
- (Kuwait) Ahmad Al-Farsi
- (Kuwait) Shaker Al-Mutairi
- (Kuwait) Abdulrahman Al-Wadi
- (Lebanon) Khaled Takaji
- (Thailand) Jirawat Sornwichian
- (Thailand) Kritsada Wongkaeo
- (United Arab Emirates) Abdulkarim Jamil

2 goals

- (Australia) Fernando
- (Australia) Chris Zeballos
- (Chinese Taipei) Chang Han
- (Chinese Taipei) Liu Chi-chao
- (Indonesia) Deny Handoyo
- (Iran) Ahmad Esmaeilpour
- (Japan) Yusuke Komiyama
- (Qatar) Rashid Yousuf
- (Tajikistan) Mansur Mamedbabaev
- (Tajikistan) Alisher Ulmasov
- (Uzbekistan) Farkhod Abdumavlyanov
- (Uzbekistan) Dilshod Rakhmatov
- (Uzbekistan) Hurshid Tajibaev
- (Uzbekistan) Shuhrat Tojiboev

1 goal

- (Australia) Greg Giovenali
- (Australia) Andres Gomez
- (Australia) Danny Ngaluafe
- (Australia) Tobias Seeto
- (Australia) Peter Spathis
- (China) Cong Lin
- (China) Deng Tao
- (China) Zhao Liang
- (Chinese Taipei) Chen Po-hao
- (Chinese Taipei) Lo Chih-an
- (Chinese Taipei) Pan Wen-chieh
- (Indonesia) Karami Balfas
- (Indonesia) Bambang Bayu Saptaji
- (Indonesia) Afif Tamimy
- (Indonesia) Gustian Sukima Wardhana
- (Iran) Ghodrat Bahadori
- (Japan) Shota Hoshi
- (Japan) Hisamitsu Kawahara
- (Kuwait) Hamad Al-Awadhi
- (Kuwait) Abdulrahman Al-Mosabehi
- (Kuwait) Fawaz Haidar
- (Kyrgyzstan) Nurjan Djetybaev
- (Kyrgyzstan) Rustam Ermekov
- (Kyrgyzstan) Emil Kanetov
- (Kyrgyzstan) Vadim Kondratkov
- (Lebanon) Karim Abou-Zeid
- (Lebanon) Hayssam Atwi
- (Lebanon) Ali El Homsi
- (Qatar) Ali Al-Sabah
- (Qatar) Saad Bilal
- (Qatar) Salem Khalifa
- (Qatar) Muneer Mohammed
- (Qatar) Amro Mohssein
- (South Korea) Kim Jeong-nam
- (South Korea) Kim Min-kuk
- (South Korea) Seo Dae-yun
- (Tajikistan) Orzu Dodkhudoev
- (Tajikistan) Sherzod Jumaev
- (Tajikistan) Akhtam Nazarov
- (Thailand) Aref Ahamah
- (Thailand) Jetsada Chudech
- (Thailand) Konghla Lakka
- (Thailand) Nattawut Madyalan
- (Turkmenistan) Mergen Atayev
- (Turkmenistan) Vatan Atayev
- (Turkmenistan) Nazim Rahimov
- (United Arab Emirates) Tariq Abdulla
- (United Arab Emirates) Yousif Banihammad
- (United Arab Emirates) Bader Ibrahim
- (Uzbekistan) Nodir Elibaev
- (Uzbekistan) Oleg Khalmukhamedov
- (Uzbekistan) Konstantin Sviridov

Own goals

- (Chinese Taipei) Yang Chao-hsun (for Tajikistan)
- (Qatar) Muneer Mohammed (for South Korea)
- (South Korea) Jeong Eui-hyun (for Iran)
- (United Arab Emirates) Abdulaziz Abdulla (for Kyrgyzstan)
- (Uzbekistan) Konstantin Sviridov (for Kuwait)
