= 2003 AFC Futsal Championship =

فوتسال قهرمانی ۲۰۰۳ آسیا

Tournament details
- Host country: Iran
- Dates: 27 July – 5 August
- Teams: 16 (from 1 confederation)
- Venue: 2 (in 2 host cities)

Final positions
- Champions: Iran (5th title)
- Runners-up: Japan
- Third place: Thailand
- Fourth place: Kuwait

Tournament statistics
- Matches played: 32
- Goals scored: 286 (8.94 per match)
- Top scorer: (Iran) Vahid Shamsaei (24 goals)
- Best player: (Iran) Vahid Shamsaei

The 2003 AFC Futsal Championship was held in Tehran and Karaj, Iran from 27 July to 5 August 2003.

== Venues ==
Tehran	Karaj
Azadi Indoor Stadium	Enghelab Indoor Stadium
Capacity: 12,000	Capacity: 2,500

== Draw ==
Group A	Group B	Group C	Group D
Japan; Kuwait; Macau; Palestine	South Korea; Indonesia; Chinese Taipei; Hong Kong; ~~Brunei~~	Iran; Kyrgyzstan; China; Lebanon	Thailand; Uzbekistan; Iraq; Malaysia; ~~Turkmenistan~~

== Group stage ==
=== Group A ===
Team	Pld	W	D	L	GF	GA	GD	Pts
Japan	3	3	0	0	23	1	+22	9
Kuwait	3	2	0	1	23	13	+10	6
Palestine	3	1	0	2	16	15	+1	3
Macau	3	0	0	3	2	35	−33	0

28 July 2003
14:30

Japan	4–0	Palestine

Azadi Indoor Stadium, Tehran

28 July 2003
19:45

Kuwait	12–1	Macau

Azadi Indoor Stadium, Tehran

29 July 2003
19:45

Kuwait	11–7	Palestine

Azadi Indoor Stadium, Tehran

30 July 2003
18:00

Japan	14–1	Macau

Azadi Indoor Stadium, Tehran

31 July 2003
14:30

Japan	5–0	Kuwait

Azadi Indoor Stadium, Tehran

31 July 2003
16:00

Macau	0–9	Palestine

Enghelab Indoor Stadium, Karaj

=== Group B ===
Team	Pld	W	D	L	GF	GA	GD	Pts
South Korea	3	3	0	0	18	10	+8	9
Chinese Taipei	3	2	0	1	14	14	0	6
Hong Kong	3	1	0	2	13	15	−2	3
Indonesia	3	0	0	3	14	20	−6	0

27 July 2003
16:45

South Korea	5–2	Hong Kong

Azadi Indoor Stadium, Tehran

28 July 2003
16:00

South Korea	6–4	Indonesia

Enghelab Indoor Stadium, Karaj

28 July 2003
18:00

Chinese Taipei	4–3	Hong Kong

Azadi Indoor Stadium, Tehran

29 July 2003
16:00

Chinese Taipei	6–4	Indonesia

Enghelab Indoor Stadium, Karaj

30 July 2003
16:00

Hong Kong	8–6	Indonesia

Enghelab Indoor Stadium, Karaj

31 July 2003
17:45

South Korea	7–4	Chinese Taipei

Enghelab Indoor Stadium, Karaj

=== Group C ===
Team	Pld	W	D	L	GF	GA	GD	Pts
Iran	3	3	0	0	37	5	+32	9
Kyrgyzstan	3	2	0	1	15	16	−1	6
Lebanon	3	1	0	2	8	23	−15	3
China	3	0	0	3	9	25	−16	0

27 July 2003
19:00

Iran	15–2	Lebanon

Azadi Indoor Stadium, Tehran

29 July 2003
16:15

China	4–9	Kyrgyzstan

Azadi Indoor Stadium, Tehran

30 July 2003
16:15

China	3–4	Lebanon

Azadi Indoor Stadium, Tehran

31 July 2003
19:45

Iran	10–1	Kyrgyzstan

Azadi Indoor Stadium, Tehran

1 August 2003
16:45

Kyrgyzstan	5–2	Lebanon

Azadi Indoor Stadium, Tehran

1 August 2003
18:00

Iran	12–2	China

Azadi Indoor Stadium, Tehran

=== Group D ===
Team	Pld	W	D	L	GF	GA	GD	Pts
Thailand	3	3	0	0	11	1	+10	9
Uzbekistan	3	2	0	1	10	5	+5	6
Iraq	3	1	0	2	12	10	+2	3
Malaysia	3	0	0	3	3	20	−17	0

28 July 2003
16:15

Thailand	3–1	Iraq

Azadi Indoor Stadium, Tehran

29 July 2003
18:00

Thailand	7–0	Malaysia

Azadi Indoor Stadium, Tehran

30 July 2003
19:45

Iraq	3–5	Uzbekistan

Azadi Indoor Stadium, Tehran

31 July 2003
16:15

Thailand	1–0	Uzbekistan

Azadi Indoor Stadium, Tehran

31 July 2003
18:00

Iraq	8–2	Malaysia

Azadi Indoor Stadium, Tehran

1 August 2003
14:30

Malaysia	1–5	Uzbekistan

Azadi Indoor Stadium, Tehran

== Knockout stage ==
Quarter-finals
August 3 – Tehran
Japan	7
Chinese Taipei	0
August 3 – Tehran
Thailand	2
Kyrgyzstan	1
August 3 – Tehran
Iran	7
Uzbekistan	2
August 3 – Tehran
South Korea	1 (5)
Kuwait (p)	1 (6)

Semi-finals
August 4 – Tehran
Japan (aet)	3
Thailand	2
August 4 – Tehran
Iran	10
Kuwait	2

Final
August 5 – Tehran
Japan	4
Iran	6
Third place
August 5 – Tehran
Thailand	8
Kuwait	2

=== Quarter-finals ===
3 August 2003
14:30

South Korea	1–1 (a.e.t.)	Kuwait
Kim Chul-ho 7'		Al-Othman 17'
Penalties
	5–6

Azadi Indoor Stadium, Tehran

3 August 2003
16:15

Thailand	2–1	Kyrgyzstan
Polsak 14'; Issarasuwipakorn 36'		Abdyraimov 37'

Azadi Indoor Stadium, Tehran

3 August 2003
18:00

Japan	7–0	Chinese Taipei
Fujii; Ichihara; Watanabe; Sagane; Kogure

Azadi Indoor Stadium, Tehran

3 August 2003
19:45

Iran	7–2	Uzbekistan
Shamsaei; Dadashi; Mohammadi; Abdollahnejad; Zareei		Goal

Azadi Indoor Stadium, Tehran

=== Semi-finals ===
4 August 2003
16:00

Japan	3–2 (a.e.t.)	Thailand
Kogure 10'; Maeda 13' 50'		Issarasuwipakorn 5'; Munjarern 35'

Azadi Indoor Stadium, Tehran

4 August 2003
18:00

Iran	10–2	Kuwait
Mohammadi; Shamsaei; Shandizi; Abdollahnejad; Raeisi; Zareei		Hussain; Al-Mass

Azadi Indoor Stadium, Tehran

=== Third place play-off ===
5 August 2003
16:00

Thailand	8–2	Kuwait
Polsak 3'; Piemkum 9', 22'; Munjarern 13', 16', 19'; Innui 37', 39'		Al-Othman 26'; Al-Enezi 34'

Azadi Indoor Stadium, Tehran

=== Final ===
5 August 2003
18:00

Japan	4–6	Iran
Nambata 12'; Suzumura 26'; Maeda 28'; Ichihara 33'		Heidarian 2', 31'; Shamsaei 5', 6', 22', 38'

Azadi Indoor Stadium, Tehran
Attendance: 12,000

== Awards ==
AFC Futsal Championship 2003 winners

Iran
5th title

Vahid Shamsaei, Mohammad Hashemzadeh, Siamak Dadashi, Saeid Abdollahnejad, Mohammad Reza Heidarian, Reza Nasseri, Hamid Shandizi, Kazem Mohammadi, Mohsen Zareei, Ali Saneei, Ahmad Pariazar, Majid Raeisi, Hamid Neshatjoo, Hamid Reza Abrarinia
Coach: (Iran) Mohammad Hassan Ansarifard

- Most Valuable Player
  - (Iran) Vahid Shamsaei
- Top Scorer
  - (Iran) Vahid Shamsaei (24 goals)
- Best Goalkeeper
  - (Japan) Hisamitsu Kawahara
- Fair-Play Award
  - Iran
