= 2013 Grand Prix de Futsal =

Tournament details
- Host country: Brazil
- Dates: 22–27 October
- Teams: 8 (from 4 confederations)
- Venue(s): 1 (in 1 host city)

Final positions
- Champions: Brazil (7th title)
- Runners-up: Russia
- Third place: Iran
- Fourth place: Paraguay

Tournament statistics
- Matches played: 18
- Goals scored: 115 (6.39 per match)

The 2013 Grand Prix de Futsal was the eighth edition of the international futsal competition of the same kind as the FIFA Futsal World Cup but with invited nations and held annually in Brazil. It was first held in 2005.

== Participating ==
Team	Confederation	Qualification
Iran	AFC	2012 AFC Futsal Championship Third Place
Japan	AFC	2012 AFC Futsal Championship Winners
Guatemala	CONCACAF	2012 CONCACAF Futsal Championship Runners-up
Brazil	CONMEBOL	2011 Copa América – FIFA Futsal Winners
Argentina	CONMEBOL	2011 Copa América – FIFA Futsal Runners-up
Paraguay	CONMEBOL	2011 Copa América – FIFA Futsal Third Place
Russia	UEFA	UEFA Futsal Euro 2012 Runners-up
Serbia	UEFA	Invitee

== First round ==
=== Group A ===
Team	Pld	W	D	L	GF	GA	GD	Pts
Brazil	3	3	0	0	25	5	+20	9
Iran	3	1	1	1	7	10	−3	4
Argentina	3	1	1	1	5	14	−9	4
Japan	3	0	0	3	4	12	−8	0

22 October 2013

Brazil	7–2	Japan

22 October 2013

Argentina	2–2	Iran

23 October 2013

Brazil	11–1	Argentina

23 October 2013

Iran	3–1	Japan

24 October 2013

Brazil	7–2	Iran

24 October 2013

Argentina	2–1	Japan

=== Group B ===
Team	Pld	W	D	L	GF	GA	GD	Pts
Russia	3	3	0	0	15	3	+12	9
Paraguay	3	2	0	1	7	8	−1	6
Guatemala	3	1	0	2	7	13	−6	3
Serbia	3	0	0	3	8	13	−5	0

22 October 2013

Russia	4–0	Guatemala

22 October 2013

Paraguay	2–1	Serbia

23 October 2013

Guatemala	7–4	Serbia

23 October 2013

Russia	7–0	Paraguay

24 October 2013

Guatemala	0–5	Paraguay

24 October 2013

Russia	4–3	Serbia

== Final round ==
=== Classification 7th–8th ===
7th place
25 October
Serbia	7
Japan	4

=== Classification 5th–6th ===
5th place
25 October
Argentina	2
Guatemala	1

=== Classification 1st–4th ===
Semifinals
26 October
Brazil	3
Paraguay	0
26 October
Russia	4
Iran	2

Final
27 October
Brazil	3(4)
Russia	3(2)
3rd place
27 October
Iran	6
Paraguay	2

==== 7th place match ====
25 October 2013
18:30

Serbia	7–4	Japan

==== 5th place match ====
25 October 2013
20:30

Argentina	2–1	Guatemala

==== Semifinal matches ====
26 October 2013
11:00

Brazil	3–0	Paraguay

26 October 2013
13:00

Russia	4–2	Iran

==== 3rd place match ====
27 October 2013
07:00

Iran	6–2	Paraguay

==== Final ====
27 October 2013
10:00

Brazil	3–3 (a.e.t.)	Russia
Penalties
	4–2

== Final standing ==
Rank	Team
1st place, gold medalist(s)	Brazil
2nd place, silver medalist(s)	Russia
3rd place, bronze medalist(s)	Iran
4	Paraguay
5	Argentina
6	Guatemala
7	Serbia
8	Japan

2013 Grand Prix de Futsal winner

Brazil
