= Hisamitsu =

Hisamitsu may refer to:

- Hisamitsu Pharmaceutical, a Japanese pharmaceutical company
- Hisamitsu Springs, a Japanese women's volleyball team based in Kobe city, Hyogo

== People with the given name ==
- Hisamitsu Kawahara (川原 永光, born 1978), Japanese futsal player
- Shimazu Hisamitsu (島津 久光, 1817–1887), Japanese samurai and daimyō
