= Kensuke Takahashi =

Kensuke Takahashi (高橋 健介, Takahashi Kensuke) may refer to:

- Kensuke Takahashi (futsal player) (高橋 健介, born 1982), Japanese futsal player
- Kensuke Takahashi (actor) (高橋 健介, born 1994), Japanese actor
