= 2007 AFC Futsal Championship qualification =

The 2007 AFC Futsal Championship qualification was held in March 2007 to determine 4 spots to the final tournament in Japan. The top 11 teams of the 2006 AFC Futsal Championship, and the host nation for the 2007 competition, receive automatic byes to Finals.

== Groups ==
=== Group A ===
Team	Pld	W	D	L	GF	GA	GD	Pts
Lebanon	3	2	1	0	23	4	+19	7
Philippines	3	2	0	1	11	12	−1	6
Chinese Taipei	3	1	1	1	9	6	+3	4
Maldives	3	0	0	3	4	25	−21	0

1 March 2007
17:20

Lebanon	8–2	Philippines
Takaji 3', 29'; Abou-Chaaya 4', 29'; Atwi 7', 7', 21'; Kawsan 32'		Ocampo 24'; Nejadsafavi 40'

Hsinchuang Gymnasium, Taipei
Attendance: 100

1 March 2007
19:00

Chinese Taipei	6–1	Maldives
Tseng Tai-lin 14'; Chang Fu-hsiang 17'; Fang Ching-jen 34', 34'; Chen Chun-chieh 35'; Tsai Chih-chieh 35'		V. Ahmed 22'

Hsinchuang Gymnasium, Taipei
Attendance: 150

3 March 2007
17:20

Maldives	1–14	Lebanon
Adeel 28'		Abou-Chaaya 5'; Atwi 6', 21', 37'; Itani 9', 10', 14'; Said 16', 40'; Takaji 22'; H. Hammoud 28', 29', 32'; Abou Taam 38'

Hsinchuang Gymnasium, Taipei
Attendance: 100

3 March 2007
19:00

Philippines	4–2	Chinese Taipei
Zerrudo 14', 30', 31', 33'		Chang Fu-hsiang 25'; Wang Chih-sheng 28'

Hsinchuang Gymnasium, Taipei
Attendance: 600

5 March 2007
17:20

Maldives	2–5	Philippines
N. Abdulla 35'; M. Mohamed 39'		Go 15'; Zerrudo 16', 22', 37'; Nejadsafavi 31'

Hsinchuang Gymnasium, Taipei
Attendance: 100

5 March 2007
19:00

Lebanon	1–1	Chinese Taipei
Abou-Chaaya 20'		Tseng Tai-lin 15'

Hsinchuang Gymnasium, Taipei
Attendance: 600

=== Group B ===
Team	Pld	W	D	L	GF	GA	GD	Pts
Iraq	3	3	0	0	34	7	+27	9
South Korea	3	2	0	1	34	9	+25	6
Indonesia	3	1	0	2	26	17	+9	3
Guam	3	0	0	3	4	65	−61	0

1 March 2007
14:00

Iraq	19–0	Guam
Khalil 2'; Ghazi 3', 6'; Jasim 4', 6', 10', 25', 39'; Khalid 7', 8', 17', 18', 18'; Hameed 16'; Abd-Ali 22', 31', 39'; Khalaf 24', 39'

Hsinchuang Gymnasium, Taipei
Attendance: 10

1 March 2007
15:40

Indonesia	1–6	South Korea
Ladjanibi 38'		Choi Yong-sun 6', 15', 38'; Kim Jeong-nam 30'; Lee Sang-keun 36', 39'

Hsinchuang Gymnasium, Taipei
Attendance: 10

3 March 2007
14:00

South Korea	3–6	Iraq
Kim Jeong-nam 14'; Lee Sang-keun 26', 40'		Jasim 10', 19', 38'; Khalid 15'; Ghazi 22'; Khalaf 25'

Hsinchuang Gymnasium, Taipei
Attendance: 30

3 March 2007
15:40

Guam	2–21	Indonesia
Gadia 3'; Pangelinan 10'		Handoyo 6', 15'; Matulessy 7', 7', 13', 23', 24', 39'; Suryasaputra 9', 17'; Ladjanibi 16', 17', 18', 25', 31', 39'; Syaibani 21', 30', 35'; Karmadi 27', 33'

Hsinchuang Gymnasium, Taipei
Attendance: 30

5 March 2007
14:00

South Korea	25–2	Guam
Choi Yong-sun 2', 3', 3', 7', 10', 13', 23', 27', 31', 32'; Sung Han-soo 3', 6', 9', 22', 24', 35'; Shin Han-kook 5'; Kim Jeong-nam 10', 33', 36'; Lee Sang-keun 15', 33', 39'; Merfalen 38' (o.g.)		Cruz 8'; Pangelinan 38'

Hsinchuang Gymnasium, Taipei
Attendance: 30

5 March 2007
15:40

Iraq	9–4	Indonesia
Khalid 3'; Jasim 7', 12', 35'; Ghazi 17', 19', 34'; Abd-Ali 37'; Hameed 40'		Issa 6'; Matulessy 12'; Karmadi 29'; Handoyo 32'

Hsinchuang Gymnasium, Taipei
Attendance: 30

== Qualifiers ==
Host nation

- Japan

2006 tournament

- Uzbekistan
- Iran
- Kyrgyzstan
- Thailand
- China
- Australia
- Tajikistan
- Hong Kong
- Malaysia
- Turkmenistan
- Kuwait

Qualification

- Lebanon
- Philippines
- Iraq
- South Korea
