= Asghar Ghahremani =

Iranian futsal player

Personal information
- Full name: Asghar Ghahremani Keri Bozorg
- Date of birth: 6 March 1972 (age 54)
- Height: 1.89 m (6 ft 2 in)
- Position: Goalkeeper

Team information
- Current team: Iran (goalkeeping coach)

Senior career*
Years	Team	Apps	(Gls)
2000	Payam Paykan		
2008	Shahr Aftab		
–2012	Persepolis		

International career^{‡}
- Iran

Managerial career
- Iran (assistant)
- Tasisat Daryaei (assistant)
- 2022–: Iran (goalkeeping coach)
- * Club domestic league appearances and goals as of 2 October 2022 ‡ National team caps and goals as of 17 August 2012

Asghar Ghahremani Keri Bozorg (Persian: اصغر قهرمانی کری بزرگ; born 6 March 1972) is an Iranian professional futsal coach and former player. He is currently goalkeeping coach of Iran national futsal team.

== Honours ==
=== Country ===
- AFC Futsal Championship
  - Champion (4): 1999 - 2000 - 2007 - 2008
