= Hamid Neshatjoo =

Iranian footballer

Personal information
- Full name: Hamid Neshatjoo
- Date of birth: January 13, 1979 (age 47)
- Place of birth: Iran
- Position: Goalkeeper

Senior career*
Years	Team	Apps	(Gls)
2006–2007	Shirin Faraz		
2007–2011	Steel Azin		
2011–2012	Shahrdari Arak		
2012–2015	Parseh Tehran		

International career^{‡}
- Iran national futsal team
- * Club domestic league appearances and goals as of 6 September 2010 ‡ National team caps and goals as of 7 March 2010

Hamid Neshatjoo (born January 13, 1979) is an Iranian footballer who plays for Steel Azin F.C. in the IPL.

== Career ==
Neshatjoo has spent his entire career with Steel Azin F.C.

=== Club Career Statistics ===
Last Update 13 December 2010

Club performance			League		Cup		Continental		Total	
Season	Club	League	Apps	Goals	Apps	Goals	Apps	Goals	Apps	Goals
Iran			League		Hazfi Cup		Asia		Total	
2007–08	Steel Azin	Azadegan		0		0	-	-		0
2008–09	Steel Azin	Azadegan		0		0	-	-		0
2009–10	Steel Azin	Persian Gulf Cup	25	0		0	-	-		0
2010–11	Steel Azin	Persian Gulf Cup	6	0	2	0	-	-	8	0
Total	Iran			0		0	0	0		0
Career total				0		0	0	0		0
