= Futsal Confederations Cup =

- Founded: 2009
- Region: International (FIFA)
- Teams: 8
- Current champions: Argentina (1st title)
- Most championships: Argentina; Brazil; Iran (1 title each)

The Futsal Confederations Cup is a futsal tournament for national teams. It is contested by the winners of each of the six FIFA confederation championships (AFC, CAF, CONCACAF, CONMEBOL, UEFA, OFC), the winner of the FIFA Futsal World Cup and the host country. It is not to be confused with the Continental Futsal Championship, a friendly tournament hosted annually by Thailand.

== History ==
On 2009, Iran became the first national team to win the inaugural Confederations Cup.

== Results ==
Year	Host	Winner	Score	Runner-up	Third place	Score	Fourth place	Number of teams
2009; Details	Libya	Iran	^{n/a}	Uruguay	Libya	^{n/a}	Guatemala	5
2013; Details	Brazil	Brazil	4–1	Colombia	Chile	^{n/a}	Croatia	4
2014; Details	Kuwait	Argentina	6–2	Czech Republic	Brazil	3–0	Italy	8

^n/a A round-robin tournament determined the final standings.

== Ranking ==
Team	Titles	Runners-up	Third place	Fourth place	Top 4 finishes
Brazil	1 (2013*)	0	1 (2014)	0	2
Iran	1 (2009)	0	0	0	1
Argentina	1 (2014)	0	0	0	1
Uruguay	0	1 (2009)	0	0	1
Colombia	0	1 (2013)	0	0	1
Czech Republic	0	1 (2014)	0	0	1
Libya	0	0	1 (2009*)	0	1
Chile	0	0	1 (2013)	0	1
Guatemala	0	0	0	1 (2009)	1
Croatia	0	0	0	1 (2013)	1
Italy	0	0	0	1 (2014)	1

* host nation

== Comprehensive team results by tournament ==
Legend

- 1st — Champions
- 2nd — Runners-up
- 3rd — Third place
- 4th — Fourth place
- 5th-8th — Fifth to eighth place
- R1 — Round 1
- × – Did not enter
- × – Entered but withdrew
- Q — Qualified for upcoming tournament
- — Hosts

Nation	2009 (Libya)	2013 (Brazil)	2014 (Kuwait)	Years
Argentina	×	×	1st	1
Brazil	×	1st	3rd	2
Chile	×	3rd	×	1
Colombia	×	2nd	×	1
Croatia	×	4th	×	1
Czech Republic	×	×	2nd	1
Egypt	×	×	5th	1
Guatemala	4th	×	8th	2
Iran	1st	×	×	1
Italy	×	×	4th	1
Japan	×	×	6th	1
Kuwait	×	×	7th	1
Libya	3rd	×	×	1
Solomon Islands	5th	×	×	1
Uruguay	2nd	×	×	1
Nations	5	4	8	-

== Overall team records ==
In this ranking 3 points are awarded for a win, 1 for a draw and 0 for a loss. As per statistical convention in football, matches decided in extra time are counted as wins and losses, while matches decided by penalty shoot-outs are counted as draws. Teams are ranked by total points, then by goal difference, then by goals scored. As of 2014

Rank	Team	Part	Pld	W	D	L	GF	GA	GD	Pts
1	Brazil	2	9	8	0	1	35	9	+26	24
2	Iran	2	8	7	0	1	26	8	+18	18
3	Argentina	1	5	4	0	1	23	8	+15	12
4	Italy	1	5	3	1	1	10	9	+1	10
5	Czech Republic	1	5	3	1	2	14	15	–1	7
6	Uruguay	1	4	2	0	2	19	11	+8	6
7	Libya	1	4	2	0	2	11	11	0	6
8	Colombia	1	4	2	0	2	10	11	–1	6
9	Guatemala	2	7	1	1	5	18	33	–15	4
10	Egypt	1	3	1	0	2	8	11	–3	3
11	Japan	1	3	1	0	2	6	9	–3	3
12	Chile	1	3	0	1	2	3	10	–7	1
13	Croatia	1	3	0	1	2	3	12	–9	1
14	Solomon Islands	1	4	0	1	3	12	29	–17	1
15	Kuwait	1	3	0	0	3	6	15	−9	0

== See also ==
- FIFA Futsal World Cup
