= Prakit Dankhuntod =

Thai futsal player

Personal information
- Full name: Prakit Dankhuntod
- Date of birth: 30 December 1983 (age 42)
- Place of birth: Chaiyaphum, Thailand
- Height: 1.70 m (5 ft 7 in)
- Position: Goalkeeper

Team information
- Current team: Port Authority of Thailand FC
- Number: 2

International career^{‡}
Years	Team	Apps	(Gls)
2012–	Thailand		
- ‡ National team caps and goals as of 13:05, 23 May 2008 (UTC)

Prakit Dankhuntod (Thai ประกิต ด่านขุนทด; born 30 December 1983), is a Thai futsal goalkeeper, and currently a member of Thailand national futsal team.

He competed for Thailand at the 2012 FIFA Futsal World Cup finals in Thailand.
