= Valerio Barigelli =

Italian futsal player

Barigelli
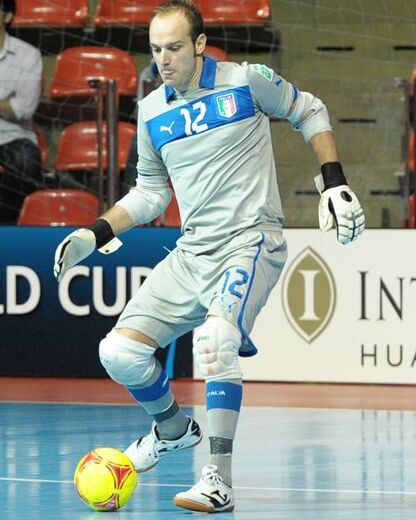
- Valerio Barigelli in 2012

Personal information
- Full name: Valerio Barigelli
- Date of birth: 19 October 1982 (age 44)
- Place of birth: Rome, Italy
- Position: Goalkeeper

Team information
- Current team: Lazio

Senior career*
Years	Team	Apps	(Gls)
2003–2004	Torrino		
2004–2006	Terni		
2006–2007	Roma		
2007–2010	Maran		
2010–12	Pescara		
2012–	Lazio		

International career
–	Italy		
- * Club domestic league appearances and goals

Valerio Barigelli (born 19 October 1982) is an Italian futsal player who plays for Lazio and the Italian national futsal team.
