= Salem Khalifa =

Saudi Arabian sprinter

Personal information
- Nationality: Saudi Arabian
- Born: 19 March 1955 (age 71)

Sport
- Sport: Sprinting
- Event: 4 × 100 metres relay

Salem Khalifa (Arabic: سالم خليفة; born 19 March 1955) is a Saudi Arabian sprinter. He competed in the men's 4 × 100 metres relay at the 1976 Summer Olympics.
