= 2009 Al-Fateh Confederations Futsal Cup =

Tournament details
- Host country: Libya
- Dates: 6 October – 11 October
- Teams: 5 (from 5 confederations)
- Venue(s): 1 (in 1 host city)

Final positions
- Champions: Iran (1st title)
- Runners-up: Uruguay
- Third place: Libya
- Fourth place: Guatemala

Tournament statistics
- Matches played: 10
- Goals scored: 71 (7.1 per match)
- Top scorer(s): (Solomon Islands) Elliot Ragomo
- Best player(s): (Iran) Vahid Shamsaei

The 2009 Al-Fateh Confederations Futsal Cup, being the first Futsal Confederations Cup, was held in Libya from 6 to 11 October 2009. The draw was held on 4 October 2009 in Tripoli. After Spain withdrew on 3 October, it was decided to be a single group competition. Iran won the tournament after winning all their matches.

== Participating teams ==
Team	Confederation	Qualification
Iran	AFC	2008 AFC Futsal Championship winners
Libya	CAF	Host and 2008 African Futsal Championship winners
Guatemala	CONCACAF	2008 CONCACAF Futsal Championship winners
Uruguay	CONMEBOL	2008 Copa América de Futsal runners-up
Solomon Islands	OFC	2009 Oceanian Futsal Championship winners
Spain (Withdrew)	UEFA	2007 UEFA Futsal Championship winners

== Referees ==
- (Libya) Tawfiq Al-Dawi
- (Libya) Ahmed Fitouri
- (Tunisia) Mohammed Obeid
- (Tunisia) Shams al-Din Allmty
- (Morocco) Abd-Alaali Alzeidani
- (Cameroon) Angulo Chataao
- (Mexico) Francisco Rivera Llerenas
- (Peru) Hector Asturado
- (Croatia) Edi Sunjc
- (Czech Republic) Karel Henych

== Tournament ==
=== Matches ===
Date	Team 1	Score (HT)	Team 2
2009-10-06	Libya	6–5 (1–3)	Solomon Islands
2009-10-07	Iran	4–2 (2–2)	Guatemala
2009-10-07	Solomon Islands	1–11 (0–7)	Uruguay
2009-10-08	Libya	3–2 (1–1)	Guatemala
2009-10-09	Iran	4–2 (3–1)	Uruguay
2009-10-09	Solomon Islands	6–6 (4–2)	Guatemala
2009-10-10	Solomon Islands	0–6 (0–4)	Iran
2009-10-10	Libya	2–3 (2–1)	Uruguay
2009-10-11	Uruguay	3–4 (1–2)	Guatemala
2009-10-12	Libya	0–1 (0–0)	Iran

=== Standings ===
Team	Pld	W	D	L	GF	GA	GD	Pts
Iran	4	4	0	0	15	4	+11	12
Uruguay	4	2	0	2	19	11	+8	6
Libya	4	2	0	2	11	11	0	6
Guatemala	4	1	1	2	14	16	−2	4
Solomon Islands	4	0	1	3	12	29	−17	1

== Honors ==
2009 Al-Fateh Confederations Futsal Cup

Iran
First title

- Best Player: (Iran) Vahid Shamsaei
- Best Goalkeeper: (Libya) Mohammed Al-Sharif
- Top Goal Scorer: (Solomon Islands) Elliot Ragomo
- Fair-Play Team: Libya
