= Jun Fujiwara =

Japanese futsal player (born 1982)

Personal information
- Date of birth: 23 November 1982 (age 43)
- Place of birth: Susono, Shizuoka, Japan
- Height: 1.80 m (5 ft 11 in)
- Position: Goalkeeper

Team information
- Current team: Bardral Urayasu

International career
Years	Team	Apps	(Gls)
- Japan

Jun Fujiwara (born 23 November 1982) is a Japanese futsal player who plays for Bardral Urayasu and the Japanese national futsal team.

== Clubs ==
- 2008-2010 Shriker Osaka
- 2010- Bardral Urayasu

== Titles ==
- F.League Ocean Cup (2)
  - 2008, 2009
