= Toru Fukimbara =

Japanese futsal player

Personal information
- Full name: Toru Fukimbara
- Date of birth: 18 October 1982 (age 44)
- Place of birth: Kanagawa Prefecture, Japan
- Height: 1.80 m (5 ft 11 in)
- Position: Goalkeeper

International career
| Years | Team | Apps | (Gls) |
| – | Japan | | |

Toru Fukimbara, (冨金原徹, born 18 October 1982), is a Japanese futsal player. Japanese national futsal team.

== Titles ==
- F.League (1)
  - 2016-17
- All Japan Futsal Championship (1)
  - 2017
