= Tetsuya Murakami =

Japanese futsal player and coach

Personal information
- Full name: Tetsuya Murakami
- Date of birth: 24 September 1981 (age 45)
- Place of birth: Ube, Yamaguchi, Japan
- Height: 1.74 m (5 ft 8 1/2 in)
- Position: Defender

International career
Years	Team	Apps	(Gls)
–	Japan		

Tetsuya Murakami (born 24 September 1981), is a Japanese futsal player and futsal coach. He is part of the Japanese national futsal team.

== Clubs ==
- 2005-2007 FIRE FOX
- 2008- Shriker Osaka

== Titles ==
- All Japan Futsal Championship (3)
  - 2010, 2012, 2017
