= Iran national futsal team =

Represents Iran in international futsal

Iran
- Shirt badge/Association crest
- Nickname(s): Team Melli (Persian: تیم ملی ) "The National Team", Cheetahs (Persian: یوزها) (Persian: شیرهای ایرانی) "Iranian Lions"
- Association: FFIRI
- Confederation: AFC (Asia)
- Head coach: Vahid Shamsaei
- Captain: Hossein Tayyebi
- Most caps: Ali Asghar Hassanzadeh (297)
- Top scorer: Vahid Shamsaei (392)
- Home stadium: Azadi Indoor Stadium
- FIFA code: IRN
- FIFA ranking: 5 (24 September 2026)
- Highest FIFA ranking: 4 (May 2024)
- Lowest FIFA ranking: 6 (October 2024)
| Home colours | Away colours |

First international
- Iran 19–6 Kuwait (Hong Kong; 2 May 1992)

Biggest win
- Iran 36–0 Singapore (Kuala Lumpur, Malaysia; 7 March 1999)

Biggest defeat
- Brazil 8–1 Iran (Rio de Janeiro, Brazil; 6 October 2000)

FIFA World Cup
- Appearances: 9 (First in 1992)
- Best result: (bronze) Third Place (2016 )

AFC Asian Cup
- Appearances: 18 (all) (First in 1999)
- Best result: (gold) Champions (1999, 2000, 2001, 2002, 2003, 2004, 2005, 2007, 2008, 2010, 2016, 2018, 2024, 2026); (silver) Runners-up (2014, 2022); (bronze) Third place (2006, 2012)

CAFA Futsal Cup
- Appearances: 1 (First in 2023 Muhammad Futsal Cup)
- Best result: (gold) Champions (2023)

Confederations Cup
- Appearances: 2 (First in 2009, 2022)
- Best result: Champions (2009); Runners up (2022)

Grand Prix de Futsal
- Appearances: 7 (First in 2007)
- Best result: (silver) Runners-up (2007, 2009, 2015); (bronze) Third place (2013, 2014); 4th place (2010, 2011)

The Iran national futsal team represents Iran in international futsal competitions and is controlled by the Futsal Commission of the Iranian Football Federation. According to the FIFA Men's Futsal Ranking, it is ranked 4th in the world, and 1st amongst Asian Football Confederation members.

The Iranian national team is a regular participant of the FIFA Futsal World Cup, reaching third place in 2016, after eliminating the favorites, Brazil, in the round of 16. Iran has won the first Futsal Confederations Cup in 2009, and also reached the second place in the Grand Prix de Futsal, known as Futsal Mini-World Cup, in multiple editions.

== Team image ==
=== Nicknames ===
The Iranian national team has received several nicknames from supporters and media. The most common one used to refer the team is "Team Melli", which literally means "The National Team". Also, "Cheetahs" are often used due to the existence of cheetahs in Iran. The picture of a cheetah is on the home kit of Iran helping to support and protect them.

=== Home stadium ===
Iran plays the home games at the Azadi Indoor Stadium with a capacity of 6,583 spectators.

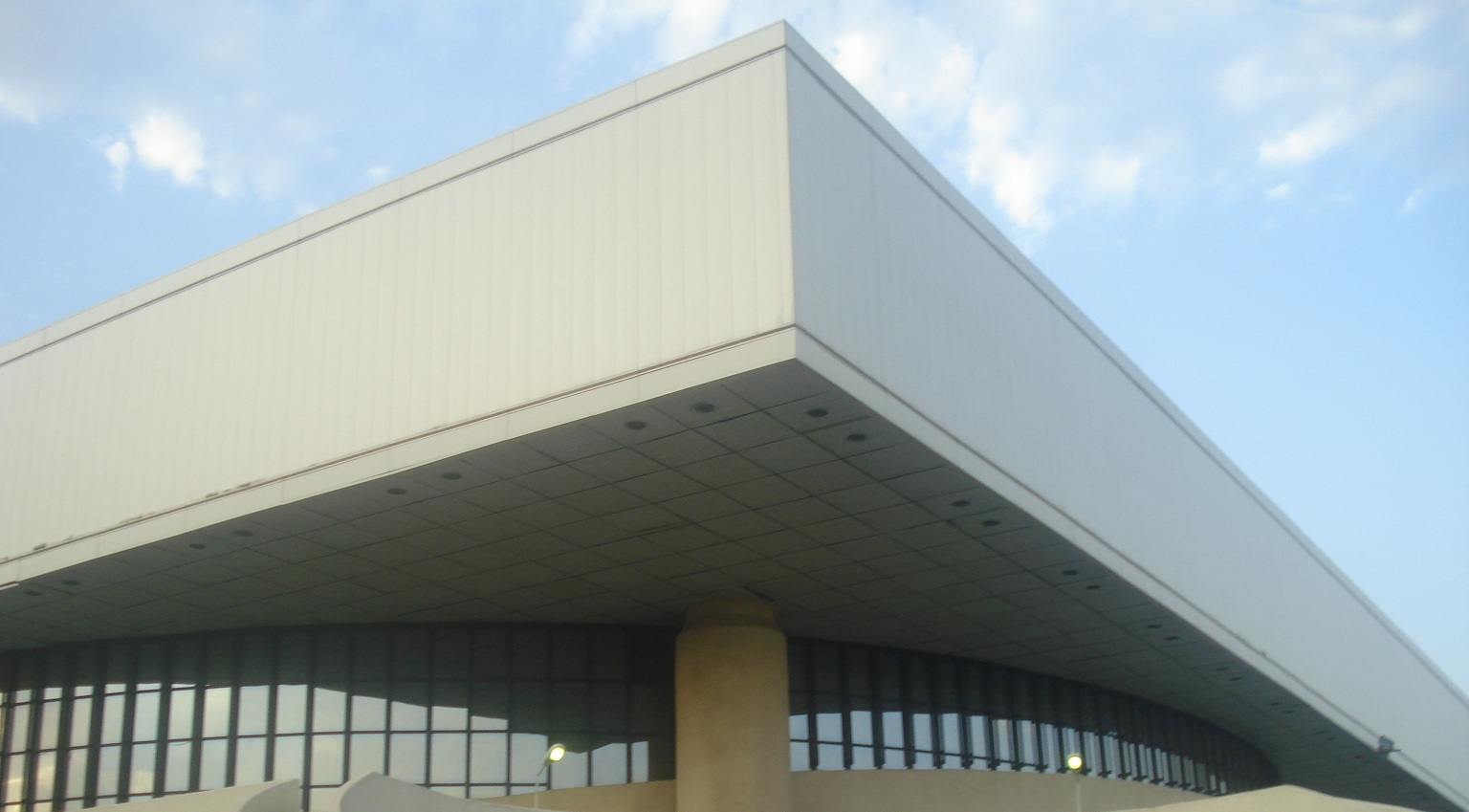
A view of Azadi Indoor Stadium

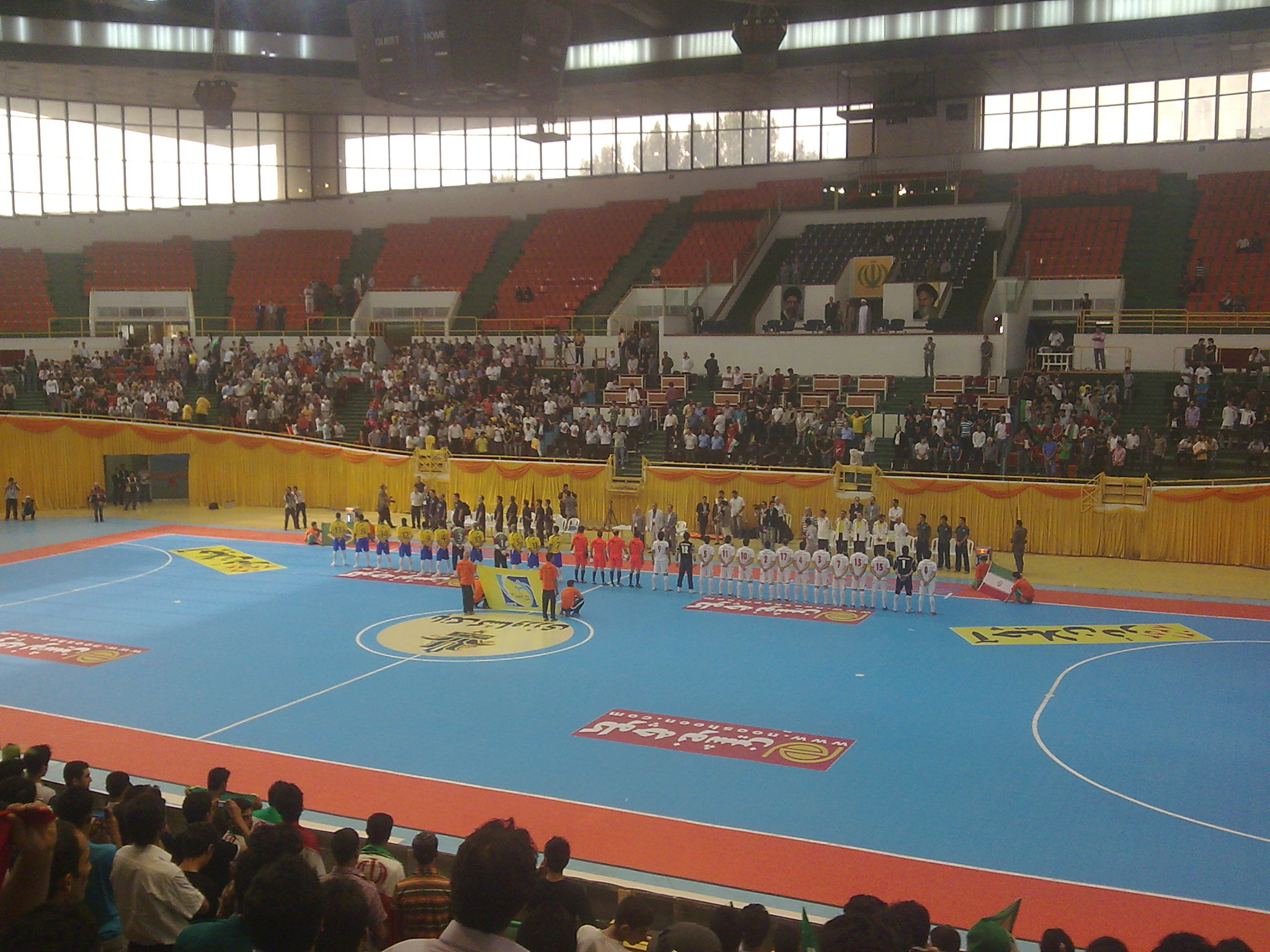
Iran national futsal team plays against Brazil in a friendly match

== Results and fixtures ==
=== Previous matches ===
Win Draw Loss

| Date | Venue | Opponent | Competition | Result | Iranian scorers | Match report |

== Coaching staff ==
=== Current coaching staff ===
| Head coach | (Iran) Vahid Shamsaei |
| Assistant coaches | (Iran) Shahabeddin Sofalmanesh (Iran) Siamak Dadashi |
| Goalkeeping coach | (Iran) Asghar Ghahremani |
| Supervisor | (Iran) Abolfazl Karimian |
| Doctor | (Iran) Mohammad Hossein Moghaddam |
| Physiotherapist | (Iran) Meysam Shirzad |
| Masseur | (Iran) Hamed Masoumi |
| Procurement | (Iran) Hassan Faraji Ghaleh Shahrokhi |
| Media director | (Iran) Amir Khosravi |
| Guard | (Iran) Reza Mobaraki |

Last updated: 2 October 2022

== Players ==
=== Current squad ===
The following players were called up to the squad for the 2024 FIFA Futsal World Cup.

Head coach: Vahid Shamsaei

| No. | Pos. | Player | Date of birth (age) | Club |
|---|---|---|---|---|
| 1 | GK | Bagher Mohammadi | 21 June 1991 (aged 33) | (Football Federation Islamic Republic of Iran) Giti Pasand |
| 2 | GK | Saeid Momeni | 23 November 1992 (aged 31) | (Football Federation Islamic Republic of Iran) Crop Alvand |
| 3 | MF | Sajad Youssefkhah | 17 April 1995 (aged 29) | (Football Federation Islamic Republic of Iran) Crop Alvand |
| 4 | DF | Alireza Rafieipour | 9 October 1993 (aged 30) | (Football Federation Islamic Republic of Iran) Giti Pasand |
| 5 | DF | Mohammad Hossein Derakhshani | 1 April 1993 (aged 31) | (Football Federation Islamic Republic of Iran) Giti Pasand |
| 6 | DF | Mohammad Reza Sangsefidi | 2 November 1989 (aged 34) | (Football Federation Islamic Republic of Iran) Giti Pasand |
| 7 | MF | Ali Asghar Hassanzadeh (captain) | 2 November 1987 (aged 36) | (Football Federation Islamic Republic of Iran) Mes Sungun |
| 8 | MF | Moslem Oladghobad | 29 November 1995 (aged 28) | (Football Federation Islamic Republic of Iran) Gohar Zamin |
| 9 | FW | Saeid Ahmadabbasi | 31 July 1992 (aged 32) | (Football Federation Islamic Republic of Iran) Giti Pasand |
| 10 | FW | Hossein Tayyebi | 29 September 1988 (aged 35) | (Football Federation Islamic Republic of Iran) Gohar Zamin |
| 11 | MF | Mahdi Karimi | 28 January 1997 (aged 27) | (Football Federation Islamic Republic of Iran) Giti Pasand |
| 12 | MF | Salar Aghapour | 7 March 2000 (aged 24) | (Football Federation Islamic Republic of Iran) Gohar Zamin |
| 13 | MF | Amir Hossein Davoudi | 16 August 2002 (aged 22) | (Football Federation Islamic Republic of Iran) Giti Pasand |
| 14 | FW | Behrooz Azimi | 25 August 2001 (aged 23) | (Football Federation Islamic Republic of Iran) Mes Sungun |

== Previous squads ==
Iran's first squad in 1992

=== FIFA Futsal World Cup ===
- 1992 FIFA Futsal World Cup squads
- 1996 FIFA Futsal World Cup squads
- 2000 FIFA Futsal World Cup squads
- 2004 FIFA Futsal World Cup squads
- 2008 FIFA Futsal World Cup squads
- 2012 FIFA Futsal World Cup squads
- 2016 FIFA Futsal World Cup squads
- 2021 FIFA Futsal World Cup squads
- 2024 FIFA Futsal World Cup squads

=== AFC Futsal Asian Cup ===
- 1999 AFC Futsal Championship squads
- 2000 AFC Futsal Championship squads
- 2001 AFC Futsal Championship squads
- 2002 AFC Futsal Championship squads
- 2003 AFC Futsal Championship squads
- 2004 AFC Futsal Championship squads
- 2005 AFC Futsal Championship squads
- 2007 AFC Futsal Championship squads
- 2008 AFC Futsal Championship squads
- 2010 AFC Futsal Championship squads
- 2018 AFC Futsal Championship squads
- 2022 AFC Futsal Championship squads
- 2024 AFC Futsal Championship squads
- 2026 AFC Futsal Championship squads

== Notable players ==
- Mehdi Abtahi
- Siamak Dadashi
- Mohsen Garousi
- Behzad Gholampour
- Mohammad Reza Heidarian
- Babak Masoumi
- Reza Nasseri
- Mostafa Nazari
- Saeid Rajabi
- Vahid Shamsaei
- Mohammad Reza Sangsefidi
- Sadegh Varmazyar

== Captains ==
=== FIFA Futsal World Cup ===
| # | Matches as captain (goals) | Player | World Cup played as captain |
|---|---|---|---|
| 1 | 8 (3) | Mehdi Abtahi | Hong Kong 1992 |
| 2 | 3 (2) | Sadegh Varmazyar | Spain 1996 |
| 3 | 3 (0) | Babak Masoumi | Guatemala 2000 |
| 4 | 3 (2) | Mohammad Reza Heidarian | Chinese Taipei 2004 |
| 5 | 7 (5) | Vahid Shamsaei | Brazil 2008 |
| 6 | 4 (0) | Mohammad Keshavarz | Thailand 2012 |
| 7 | 6 (1) | Mohammad Keshavarz | Colombia 2016 |
| 8 | 5 (3) | Ali Asghar Hassanzadeh | Lithuania 2021 |
| 9 | | | Uzbekistan 2024 |

=== AFC Futsal Asian Cup ===
| # | Matches as captain (goals) | Player | Asian Championship played as captain |
|---|---|---|---|
| 1 | | Babak Masoumi | Malaysia 1999 |
| 2 | | Babak Masoumi | Thailand 2000 |
| 3 | | Mohammad Reza Heidarian | Iran 2001 |
| 4 | | Mohammad Reza Heidarian | Indonesia 2002 |
| 5 | 6 (7) | Mohammad Reza Heidarian | Iran 2003 |
| 6 | 7 (4) | Mohammad Reza Heidarian | Macau 2004 |
| 7 | 9 (3) | Mohammad Reza Heidarian | Vietnam 2005 |
| 8 | | | Uzbekistan 2006 |
| 9 | 6 (1) | Mohammad Reza Heidarian | Japan 2007 |
| 10 | 6 (4) | Mohammad Reza Heidarian | Thailand 2008 |
| 11 | 6 (2) | Mohammad Hashemzadeh | Uzbekistan 2010 |
| 12 | 6 (7) | Vahid Shamsaei | UAE 2012 |
| 13 | 6 (2) | Mohammad Taheri | Vietnam 2014 |
| 14 | 6 (5) | Mohammad Keshavarz | Uzbekistan 2016 |
| 15 | 6 (12) | Ali Asghar Hassanzadeh | Chinese Taipei 2018 |
| 16 | 6 (10) | Hossein Tayyebi | Kuwait 2022 |
| 17 | | Ali Asghar Hassanzadeh | Thailand 2024 |

== Competitive record ==
*Denotes draws includes knockout matches decided on penalty shootouts.
**Red border indicates that the tournament was hosted on home soil.
***Gold, silver, bronze backgrounds indicates 1st, 2nd and 3rd finishes respectively. Bold text indicates best finish in tournament.

=== FIFA Futsal World Cup ===
| FIFA Futsal World Cup | | | | | | | | | | Qualification | | | | | | | |
| Year | Round | Rank | M | W | D | L | GF | GA | GD | M | W | D | L | GF | GA | GD | Link |
|---|---|---|---|---|---|---|---|---|---|---|---|---|---|---|---|---|---|
| (Netherlands) 1988 | Did not enter | | | | | | | | | No qualification | | | | | | | |
| (Hong Kong) 1992 | **Fourth place** | **4th** | **8** | **5** | **0** | **3** | **36** | **30** | **+6** | 2 | 2 | 0 | 0 | 25 | 8 | +17 | Link |
| (Spain) 1996 | First round | 11th | 3 | 1 | 0 | 2 | 12 | 14 | –2 | 4 | 4 | 0 | 0 | 47 | 8 | +39 | Link |
| (Guatemala) 2000 | First round | 10th | 3 | 1 | 0 | 2 | 6 | 9 | –3 | 2000 AFC Futsal Championship | | | | | | | – |
| (Taiwan) 2004 | First round | 11th | 3 | 1 | 0 | 2 | 9 | 13 | –4 | 2004 AFC Futsal Championship | | | | | | | – |
| (Brazil) 2008 | Second round | 5th | 7 | 4 | 2 | 1 | 24 | 19 | +5 | 2008 AFC Futsal Championship | | | | | | | – |
| (Thailand) 2012 | Round of 16 | 10th | 4 | 2 | 1 | 1 | 9 | 8 | +1 | 2012 AFC Futsal Championship | | | | | | | – |
| (Colombia) 2016 | **Third place** | **3rd** | **7** | **2** | **3** | **2** | **22** | **24** | **–2** | 2016 AFC Futsal Championship | | | | | | | – |
| (Lithuania) 2020 | Quarter-finals | 7th | 5 | 3 | 0 | 2 | 19 | 17 | +2 | Nominated by AFC | | | | | | | Link |
| (Uzbekistan) 2024 | Round of 16 | 9th | 4 | 3 | 0 | 1 | 23 | 10 | +13 | 2024 AFC Futsal Asian Cup | | | | | | | – |
| 2028 | - | - | - | - | - | - | - | - | - | 2028 AFC Futsal Asian Cup | | | | | | | – |
| Total : 9/10 | Third place | 3rd | 44 | 22 | 6 | 16 | 160 | 144 | +16 | 6 | 6 | 0 | 0 | 72 | 16 | +56 | – |

=== AFC Futsal Asian Cup ===
| AFC Futsal Asian Cup | | | | | | | | | | Qualification | | | | | | | |
| Year | Round | Rank | M | W | D | L | GF | GA | GD | M | W | D | L | GF | GA | GD | Link |
|---|---|---|---|---|---|---|---|---|---|---|---|---|---|---|---|---|---|
| (Malaysia) 1999 | **Champions** | 1st | 6 | 6 | 0 | 0 | 90 | 7 | +83 | No qualification | | | | | | | |
| (Thailand) 2000 | **Champions** | 1st | 6 | 6 | 0 | 0 | 56 | 10 | +46 | No qualification | | | | | | | |
| (Iran) 2001 | **Champions** | 1st | 7 | 7 | 0 | 0 | 97 | 13 | +84 | No qualification | | | | | | | |
| (Indonesia) 2002 | **Champions** | 1st | 6 | 6 | 0 | 0 | 61 | 7 | +54 | No qualification | | | | | | | |
| (Iran) 2003 | **Champions** | 1st | 6 | 6 | 0 | 0 | 60 | 13 | +47 | No qualification | | | | | | | |
| (Macau) 2004 | **Champions** | 1st | 7 | 7 | 0 | 0 | 81 | 12 | +69 | No qualification | | | | | | | |
| (Vietnam) 2005 | **Champions** | 1st | 8 | 6 | 1 | 1 | 58 | 15 | +43 | No qualification | | | | | | | |
| (Uzbekistan) 2006 | **Third place** | 3rd | 5 | 4 | 0 | 1 | 46 | 12 | +34 | Automatically qualified | | | | | | | Link |
| (Japan) 2007 | **Champions** | 1st | 6 | 6 | 0 | 0 | 50 | 9 | +41 | Automatically qualified | | | | | | | Link |
| (Thailand) 2008 | **Champions** | 1st | 6 | 6 | 0 | 0 | 48 | 2 | +46 | Automatically qualified | | | | | | | Link |
| (Uzbekistan) 2010 | **Champions** | 1st | 6 | 6 | 0 | 0 | 57 | 9 | +48 | Automatically qualified | | | | | | | Link |
| (United Arab Emirates) 2012 | **Third place** | 3rd | 6 | 5 | 0 | 1 | 45 | 9 | +36 | Automatically qualified | | | | | | | Link |
| (Vietnam) 2014 | **Runners-up** | 2nd | 6 | 5 | 1 | 0 | 52 | 8 | +44 | Automatically qualified | | | | | | | Link |
| (Uzbekistan) 2016 | **Champions** | 1st | 6 | 6 | 0 | 0 | 48 | 4 | +44 | Automatically qualified | | | | | | | Link |
| (Taiwan) 2018 | **Champions** | 1st | 6 | 6 | 0 | 0 | 50 | 6 | +44 | 2 | 2 | 0 | 0 | 20 | 4 | +16 | Link |
| (Turkmenistan) 2020 | Qualified but cancelled due to COVID-19 pandemic | | | | | | | | | 2 | 2 | 0 | 0 | 12 | 3 | +9 | Link |
| (Kuwait) 2022 | **Runners-up** | 2nd | 6 | 5 | 0 | 1 | 39 | 5 | +34 | 3 | 3 | 0 | 0 | 28 | 1 | +27 | Link |
| (Thailand) 2024 | **Champions** | 1st | 6 | 5 | 1 | 0 | 25 | 9 | +16 | 3 | 3 | 0 | 0 | 34 | 4 | +30 | Link |
| (Indonesia) 2026 | **Champions** | 1st | 6 | 5 | 1 | 0 | 27 | 14 | +13 | 3 | 3 | 0 | 0 | 26 | 0 | +26 | Link |
| Total : 18/18 | 14 titles | 1st | 111 | 103 | 4 | 4 | 990 | 164 | +826 | 13 | 13 | 0 | 0 | 120 | 12 | +108 | – |

=== Asian Indoor and Martial Arts Games ===
Asian Indoor and Martial Arts Games record
| Year | Round | Rank | M | W | D | L | GF | GA | GD |
|---|---|---|---|---|---|---|---|---|---|
| (Thailand) 2005^{*} | **Champions** | **1st** | **5** | **5** | **0** | **0** | **41** | **3** | **+38** |
| (Macau) 2007^{*} | **Champions** | **1st** | **7** | **7** | **0** | **0** | **73** | **12** | **+61** |
| (Vietnam) 2009^{*} | **Champions** | **1st** | **5** | **4** | **1** | **0** | **64** | **7** | **+57** |
| (South Korea) 2013 | **Champions** | **1st** | **5** | **5** | **0** | **0** | **43** | **9** | **+34** |
| (Turkmenistan) 2017 | **Champions** | **1st** | **6** | **6** | **0** | **0** | **58** | **11** | **+47** |
| (Saudi Arabia) 2026 | TBD | | | | | | | | |
| Total | 5 titles | 5/5 | 28 | 27 | 1 | 0 | 279 | 42 | +237 |

^{*} Iran played with U-23 team in this tournament.

=== Grand Prix de Futsal ===
Grand Prix de Futsal record
| Year | Round | Rank | M | W | D | L | GF | GA | GD |
|---|---|---|---|---|---|---|---|---|---|
| (Brazil) 2005 | Did not enter | | | | | | | | |
| (Brazil) 2006 | Did not enter | | | | | | | | |
| (Brazil) 2007 | **Runners-up** | 2nd | 6 | 4 | 0 | 2 | 19 | 17 | +2 |
| (Brazil) 2008 | Did not enter | | | | | | | | |
| (Brazil) 2009 | **Runners-up** | 2nd | 6 | 4 | 1 | 1 | 26 | 22 | +4 |
| (Brazil) 2010 | **Fourth place** | 4th | 6 | 3 | 1 | 2 | 24 | 15 | +9 |
| (Brazil) 2011 | **Fourth place** | 4th | 6 | 4 | 0 | 2 | 22 | 13 | +9 |
| (Brazil) 2013 | **Third place** | 3rd | 5 | 2 | 1 | 2 | 15 | 16 | –1 |
| (Brazil) 2014 | **Third place** | 3rd | 4 | 3 | 0 | 1 | 25 | 11 | +14 |
| (Brazil) 2015 | **Runners-up** | 2nd | 5 | 4 | 0 | 1 | 23 | 8 | +15 |
| (Brazil) 2018 | Did not enter | | | | | | | | |
| Total | Runners-up | 7/11 | 38 | 24 | 3 | 11 | 154 | 102 | +52 |

=== Futsal Confederations Cup ===
Futsal Confederations Cup record
| Year | Round | Rank | M | W | D | L | GF | GA | GD |
|---|---|---|---|---|---|---|---|---|---|
| (Libya) 2009 | **Champions** | **1st** | **4** | **4** | **0** | **0** | **15** | **4** | **+11** |
| (Brazil) 2013 | Did not enter | | | | | | | | |
| (Kuwait) 2014 | Did not qualify | | | | | | | | |
| Total | 1 title | 1/3 | 4 | 4 | 0 | 0 | 15 | 4 | +11 |

=== Islamic Solidarity Games ===
Islamic Solidarity Games record
| Year | Round | Rank | M | W | D | L | GF | GA | GD |
|---|---|---|---|---|---|---|---|---|---|
| (Saudi Arabia) 2025 | **Champions** | **1st** | **5** | **3** | **2** | **0** | **17** | **7** | **+10** |
| Total | 1 title | 1/1 | 5 | 3 | 2 | 0 | 17 | 7 | +10 |

=== West Asian Championship ===
West Asian Championship record
| Year | Round | Rank | M | W | D | L | GF | GA | GD |
|---|---|---|---|---|---|---|---|---|---|
| (Iran) 2007^{*} | **Champions** | **1st** | **3** | **3** | **0** | **0** | **21** | **4** | **+17** |
| (Jordan) 2009 | Did not enter | | | | | | | | |
| (Iran) 2012 | **Champions** | **1st** | **4** | **4** | **0** | **0** | **40** | **6** | **+34** |
| 2022–onwards | Not a WAFF member | | | | | | | | |
| Total | 2 titles | 2/4 | 7 | 7 | 0 | 0 | 61 | 10 | +51 |

^{*} Iran played with U-23 team in this tournament.

=== Central Asian Championship ===
Central Asian Championship record
| Year | Round | Rank | M | W | D | L | GF | GA | GD |
|---|---|---|---|---|---|---|---|---|---|
| (Tajikistan) 2023 | **Champions** | **1st** | **5** | **4** | **0** | **1** | **13** | **3** | **+10** |
| Total | 1 title | 1/1 | 5 | 4 | 0 | 1 | 13 | 3 | +10 |

^{*} Iran played with U-23 team in this tournament.

== Head-to-head record ==
The following table shows Iran's head-to-head record in the FIFA Futsal World Cup.

| Opponent | Pld | W | D | L | GF | GA | GD | Win % |
|---|---|---|---|---|---|---|---|---|
| Argentina | 3 | 0 | 0 | 3 | 3 | 10 | −7 | 0.00 |
| Azerbaijan | 1 | 0 | 1 | 0 | 3 | 3 | +0 | 0.00 |
| Belgium | 2 | 1 | 0 | 1 | 6 | 7 | −1 | 50.00 |
| Brazil | 3 | 0 | 1 | 2 | 7 | 13 | −6 | 0.00 |
| Cuba | 3 | 3 | 0 | 0 | 18 | 4 | +14 | 100.00 |
| Colombia | 1 | 0 | 0 | 1 | 1 | 2 | −1 | 0.00 |
| Czech Republic | 1 | 1 | 0 | 0 | 3 | 2 | +1 | 100.00 |
| France | 1 | 1 | 0 | 0 | 4 | 1 | +3 | 100.00 |
| Guatemala | 1 | 1 | 0 | 0 | 9 | 4 | +5 | 100.00 |
| Italy | 2 | 1 | 1 | 0 | 12 | 10 | +2 | 50.00 |
| Kazakhstan | 1 | 0 | 0 | 1 | 2 | 3 | −1 | 0.00 |
| Libya | 1 | 1 | 0 | 0 | 4 | 2 | +2 | 100.00 |
| Morocco | 3 | 2 | 0 | 1 | 10 | 8 | +2 | 66.67 |
| Netherlands | 1 | 0 | 0 | 1 | 1 | 2 | −1 | 0.00 |
| Panama | 1 | 1 | 0 | 0 | 4 | 3 | +1 | 100.00 |
| Paraguay | 2 | 2 | 0 | 0 | 14 | 9 | +5 | 100.00 |
| Poland | 1 | 1 | 0 | 0 | 2 | 0 | +2 | 100.00 |
| Portugal | 2 | 0 | 1 | 1 | 2 | 6 | −4 | 0.00 |
| Russia | 1 | 0 | 0 | 1 | 3 | 4 | −1 | 0.00 |
| Serbia | 1 | 1 | 0 | 0 | 3 | 2 | +1 | 100.00 |
| Spain | 6 | 1 | 2 | 3 | 18 | 28 | −10 | 16.67 |
| Ukraine | 1 | 1 | 0 | 0 | 5 | 4 | +1 | 100.00 |
| United States | 2 | 1 | 0 | 1 | 6 | 6 | +0 | 50.00 |
| Uruguay | 1 | 1 | 0 | 0 | 4 | 2 | +2 | 100.00 |
| Uzbekistan | 1 | 1 | 0 | 0 | 9 | 8 | +1 | 100.00 |
| Venezuela | 1 | 1 | 0 | 0 | 7 | 1 | +6 | 100.00 |
| Total | 44 | 22 | 6 | 16 | 160 | 144 | +16 | 50.00 |

ISNA.ir

== See also ==
- Futsal in Iran
- Iran national football team
- Iran national beach soccer team
- Iran women's national football team
- Iran women's national futsal team
- Futsal
- UEFA Futsal Champions League

Sporting positions
| Preceded by Inaugural champions | Asian Champions; 1999 (first title); 2000 (second title); 2001 (third title); 2002 (fourth title); 2003 (fifth title); 2004 (sixth title); 2005 (seventh title) | Succeeded by 2006 Japan |
| Preceded by 2006 Japan | Asian Champions; 2007 (eighth title); 2008 (ninth title); 2010 (tenth title) | Succeeded by 2012 Japan |
| Preceded by 2014 Japan | Asian Champions; 2016 (eleventh title); 2018 (twelfth title) | Succeeded by 2022 Japan |
