= Kotaro Inaba =

Japanese futsal player

Personal information
- Full name: Kotaro Inaba
- Date of birth: 22 December 1982 (age 43)
- Place of birth: Tokyo, Japan
- Height: 1.69 m (5 ft 6 1/2 in)
- Position: Wing

Team information
- Current team: Y.S.C.C. Yokohama

International career
Years	Team	Apps	(Gls)
–	Japan		

Kotaro Inaba (稲葉 洸太郎, Inaba Kōtarō; born 22 December 1982), is a Japanese futsal player who plays for Y.S.C.C. Yokohama and the Japanese national futsal team.

== Titles ==
- All Japan Futsal Championship (1)
  - 2008
