= Yutthana Polsak =

Thai footballer (born 1970)

Personal information
- Full name: Yutthana Polsak
- Date of birth: 21 March 1970 (age 56)
- Place of birth: Nong Khai, Thailand
- Height: 1.80 m (5 ft 11 in)
- Position: Defender

Senior career*
Years	Team	Apps	(Gls)
- Raj Pracha
- Thai Port

International career
1996–1999	Thailand		
2000–2005	Thailand (beach)		
Medal record
Thailand national football team
Sea Games
Gold medal – first place	Sea Games 1997	Football
- * Club domestic league appearances and goals

Yutthana Polsak (born 21 March 1970) is a Thai retired footballer. He represented Thailand at the 2000 and 2004 futsal world championships and the 2005 beach soccer world cup.

== See also ==
- Thailand Beach Soccer Team
- Thailand Squad On Fifa.com
