= Fernando de Moraes =

Australian soccer player (born 1980)

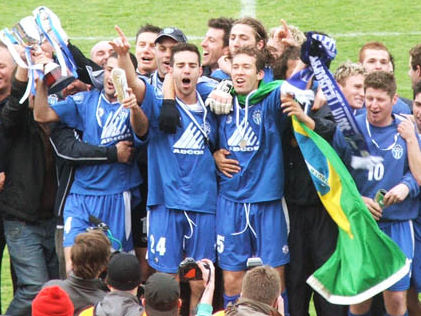
- With the Brazilian flag: Fernando celebrating the state championship 2006

Personal information
- Full name: Fernando Jorge Lima de Moraes
- Date of birth: 21 January 1980 (age 46)
- Place of birth: São Paulo, Brazil
- Position: Midfielder

Senior career*
Years	Team	Apps	(Gls)
2001	Esporte Club São Bernardo		
2002–2004	Palestra de São Bernardo		
2005–2014	South Melbourne	183	(61)
2006	→ New Zealand Knights (loan)	5	(0)

International career
2008–2014	Australia (futsal)	29	(20)
- * Club domestic league appearances and goals

Fernando Jorge Lima de Moraes (born 21 January 1980), commonly referred to as Fernando, is a retired soccer player who last played for South Melbourne in the Victorian Premier League. Born in Brazil, he played for the Australia national futsal team.

== Career ==
Fernando de Moraes initially specialised in futsal while playing in Brazil, and played his first match in the outdoor version of the game at the age of 21. He first played for PSB Palestra São Bernado in Brazil before moving to Australia (where his sister lives) to play for South Melbourne FC, having seen them play at the 2000 FIFA Club World Championship. He joined the team for the 2005 Victorian Premier League season. In 2006, he left the club to undertake an unsuccessful 4-week trial at Greek Super League club Egaleo, after which he returned to Australia and played a vital role in securing the championship for South Melbourne as their highest scoring player (with a total of 12). He was signed by A-League club New Zealand Knights FC shortly after the championship victory on a short-term contract, for a fee of £90,000 (€100,000), that was extended several times, but did not feature in the Knights' line-up and was soon relegated to the bench. He returned to South Melbourne at the conclusion of the Knights' season and joined the squad for pre-season matches, eventually signing a new 2-year contract.

One of his most important goals for South Melbourne came during the 2010 Singapore Cup when his goal put South Melbourne 2-1 up against Thai Premier League champions Bangkok Glass, however it would not be enough, as Bangkok would ultimately tie 3-3 allowing them to go through on aggregate, knocking out South Melbourne in the process.

In January 2014, de Moraes officially retired from playing football.

== Honours ==
With South Melbourne:

- Victorian Premier League Championship: 2006
- Hellenic Cup: 2007, 2009
- Theo Marmaras Medal: 2006, 2010
- Club Golden Boot: 2006, 2008, 2010

Individual

- Victorian Premier League player of the year: 2010
- Hummel F-League Golden Boot: 2013
- Jimmy Rooney Medal: 2006
- Theo Marmaras Medal: 2006, 2010

With North Melbourne Futsal Club:

- Futsal Oz V-League Premiership: 2011

With Vic Vipers Futsal Club:

- Hummel F-League Champions: 2013
