= Kenichiro Kogure =

Japanese futsal player and futsal manager

Personal information
- Full name: Kenichiro Kogure
- Date of birth: 11 November 1979 (age 46)
- Place of birth: Kanagawa Prefecture, Japan
- Height: 1.75 m (5 ft 9 in)
- Position: Wing

International career^{‡}
Years	Team	Apps	(Gls)
2021–	Japan		
- ‡ National team caps and goals as of 23 November 2021

Kenichiro Kogure (Japanese: 木暮 賢一郎, born 11 November 1979) is a Japanese former futsal player and, since 2021, the Japan national futsal team manager.

== Clubs ==
- 2001–2005: (Japan) FIRE FOX
- 2005–2008: (Spain) es:Clipeus Fútbol Sala Nazareno
- 2008–2009: (Spain) Carnicer Torrejón FS
- 2008: → (Spain) MM Pérez Bujalance (loan)
- 2009–2012: (Japan) Nagoya Oceans

== Titles ==
- F.League (3)
  - 2009–10, 2010–11, 2011–12
- F.League Ocean Cup (2)
  - 2010, 2011
- AFC Futsal Club Championship (1)
  - 2011
