= Hisamitsu Kawahara =

Japanese futsal player

Personal information
- Full name: Hisamitsu Kawahara
- Date of birth: 24 November 1978 (age 47)
- Place of birth: Fuji, Shizuoka, Japan
- Height: 1.78 m (5 ft 10 in)
- Position: Goalkeeper

International career
| Years | Team | Apps | (Gls) |
| – | Japan | | |

Hisamitsu Kawahara (川原 永光, Kawahara Hisamitsu; born 24 November 1978) is a Japanese futsal player for the Japan national team.

== Clubs ==
- 1996-2005 Tahara FC
- 2005-2009 Bardral Urayasu
- 2009-2014 Nagoya Oceans
- 2014-2015 Agleymina Hamamatsu

== Titles ==
- F.League (5)
  - 2009–10, 2010–11, 2011–12, 2012–13, 2013–14
- All Japan Futsal Championship (2)
  - 2013, 2014
- F.League Ocean Cup (5)
  - 2010, 2011, 2012, 2013, 2014
- AFC Futsal Club Championship (2)
  - 2011, 2014
