= Japan national futsal team =

Japan
- Nickname(s): サムライ・ファイブ (Samurai Five)
- Association: JFA
- Confederation: AFC
- Head coach: Kensuke Takahashi
- FIFA code: JPN
- FIFA ranking: 12 (24 September 2026)
- Highest FIFA ranking: 13 (November 2024 – April 2025)
- Lowest FIFA ranking: 15 (May 2024)
Home colours	Away colours

First international
- Belgium 3–0 Japan (Rotterdam, Netherlands, 6 January 1989)

Biggest win
- Japan 18–0 Guam (Ho Chi Minh City, Vietnam, 24 May 2005)

Biggest defeat
- Spain 16–0 Japan (Torrejon de Ardoz, Spain, 29 March 2002)

FIFA World Cup
- Appearances: 5 (First in 1989)
- Best result: Round of 16 (2012, 2021)

AFC Asian Cup
- Appearances: 16 (First in 1999)
- Best result: (gold) Champions (2006, 2012, 2014, 2022)

EAFF Futsal Championship
- Appearances: 4 (First in 2009)
- Best result: (gold) Champions (2017, 2019, 2022)

Confederations Cup
- Appearances: 1 (First in 2014)
- Best result: 6th place (2014)

Grand Prix de Futsal
- Appearances: 1 (First in 2013)
- Best result: 8th place (2013)

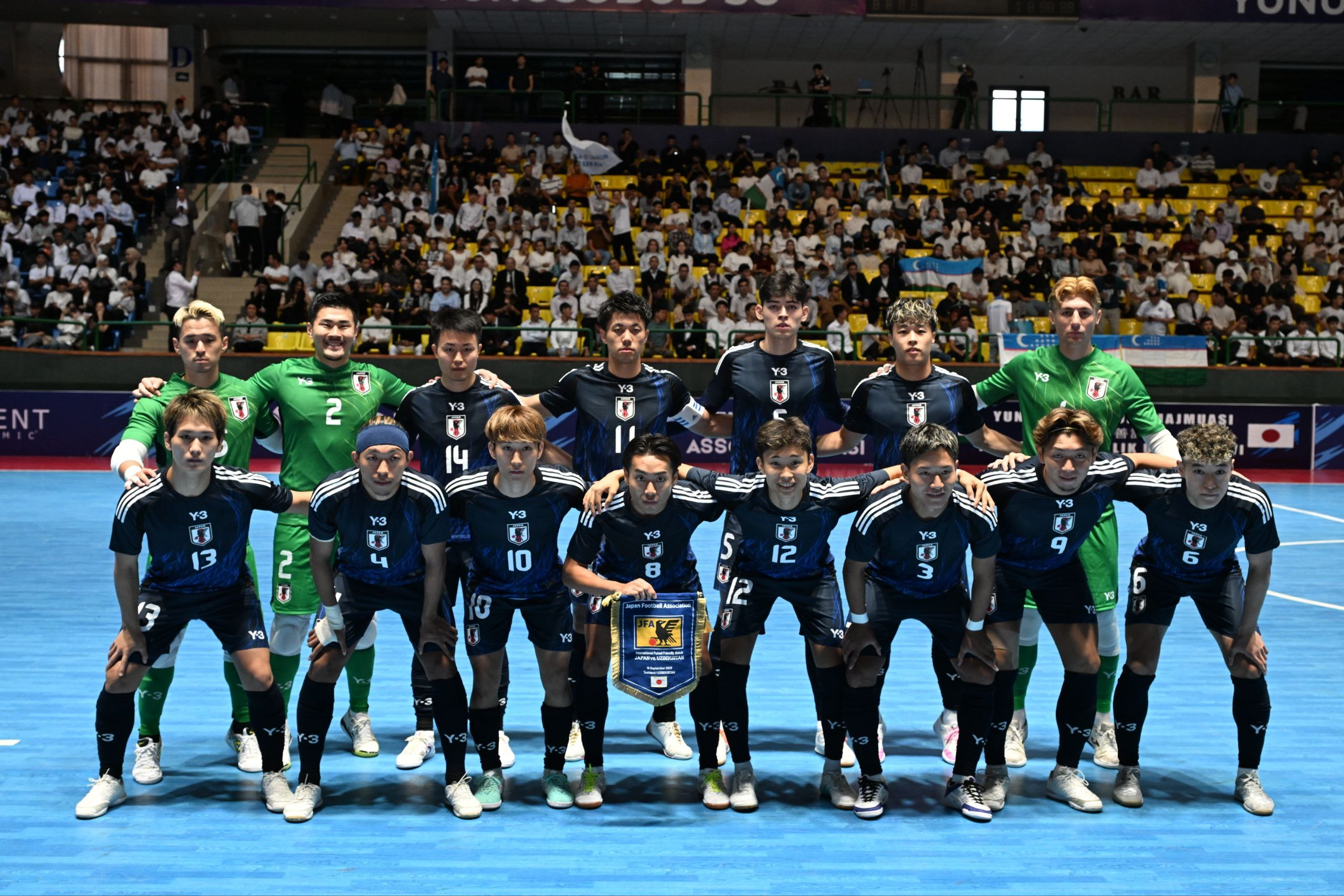
Japan national futsal team in the match Japan-Uzbekistan, 16th September 2025

The Japan national futsal team (Japanese: フットサル日本代表, Hepburn: Futtosaru Nippon Daihyō), nicknamed Samurai Five (サムライ・ファイブ, Samura Faibu), represents Japan in international futsal competitions and is controlled by the Japan Football Association.

Japan is one of the two teams besides Iran to have won the AFC Futsal Asian Cup, winning in 2006, 2012, 2014 and 2022. It has also played in five FIFA Futsal World Cups.

== Results and fixtures ==
Legend

Win Draw Lose Fixture

== Coaching staff ==
=== Current coaching staff ===
As of 9 October 2022

Role	Name
Head coach	(Japan) Kenichiro Kogure
Assistant coach	(Japan) Kensuke Takahashi (Japan) Takehiro Suga
Goalkeeping coach	(Japan) Keitaro Uchiyama
Physical coach	(Japan) Motonori Baba

=== Manager history ===
As of 24 September 2023.

Name	Period	Ref
(Spain) Bruno García Formoso	2016–2021	
(Japan) Kenichiro Kogure	2021–	

== Players ==
=== Current squad ===
The following players were called up for friendlies, played against Uzbekistan, on 22 and 24 November 2023, respectively.

No.	Pos.	Player	Date of birth (age)	Club
1	GK	Fabio Fiuza	26 January 1987 (age 39)	(Japan Football Association) Shonan Bellmare
2	GK	Guilherme Kuromoto	16 May 1986 (age 40)	(Japan Football Association) Shinagawa City
3	GK	Takuya Uehara	2 November 1996 (age 29)	(Japan Football Association) Vasagey Oita
4	FP	Kentaro Ishida	1 January 1998 (age 28)	(Japan Football Association) Bardral Urayasu
5	FP	Kyo Takahashi	5 August 1997 (age 29)	(Japan Football Association) YSCC Yokohama
6	FP	Tomoki Yoshikawa	3 February 1989 (age 37)	(Japan Football Association) Nagoya Oceans
7	FP	Shoto Yamanaka	30 July 2002 (age 24)	(Japan Football Association) Pescadola Machida
8	FP	Yuta Tsutsumi	7 October 1998 (age 28)	(Japan Football Association) YSCC Yokohama
9	FP	Takehiro Motoishi	19 September 1999 (age 27)	(Japan Football Association) Bardral Urayasu
10	FP	Sora Kanazawa	26 December 2001 (age 24)	(Japan Football Association) Nagoya Oceans
11	FP	Kazuya Shimizu	6 February 1997 (age 29)	(Japan Football Association) Nagoya Oceans
12	FP	Ruan Nakamatsu	23 January 2002 (age 24)	(Japan Football Association) Shriker Osaka
13	FP	Hyuga Saito	18 June 1998 (age 28)	(Japan Football Association) Shriker Osaka
14	FP	Shunta Uchimura	1 August 1991 (age 35)	(Japan Football Association) Shonan Bellmare
15	FP	Mitsuru Nakamura	2 January 1998 (age 28)	(Japan Football Association) Tachikawa Athletic
16	FP	Takumi Nagasaka	8 November 1994 (age 31)	(Japan Football Association) Bardral Urayasu

=== Previous squads ===
*Bold indicates winning squad

FIFA Futsal World Cup

- 1989 FIFA Futsal World Cup squad
- 2008 FIFA Futsal World Cup squad
- 2012 FIFA Futsal World Cup squad
- 2021 FIFA Futsal World Cup squad

AFC Futsal Asian Cup

- **2006 AFC Futsal Championship squad**
- **2012 AFC Futsal Championship squad**
- **2014 AFC Futsal Championship squad**
- 2016 AFC Futsal Championship squad
- 2018 AFC Futsal Championship squad
- **2022 AFC Futsal Asian Cup squad**

== Competitive record ==
=== Summary ===
Event	Gold	Silver	Bronze	Total
Futsal Asian Cup	4	6	2	12
Asian Indoor Games	0	1	1	2
East Asian Championship	3	1	0	4
Total	7	8	3	18

*Denotes draws include knockout matches decided on penalty kicks.
**Gold background color indicates that the tournament was won.
***Red border color indicates tournament was held on home soil.

=== FIFA Futsal World Cup ===
FIFA Futsal World Cup record
Year	Round	M	W	D	L	GF	GA	GD
(Netherlands) 1989	Group stage	3	0	0	3	3	11	-8
(Hong Kong) 1992	Did not qualify							
(Spain) 1996	Did not qualify							
(Guatemala) 2000	Did not qualify							
(Taiwan) 2004	Group stage	3	0	1	2	5	11	-6
(Brazil) 2008	Group stage	4	2	0	2	13	24	-11
(Thailand) 2012	Round of 16	4	1	1	2	13	17	-4
(Colombia) 2016	Did not qualify							
(Lithuania) 2021	Round of 16	4	1	0	3	13	14	-1
(Uzbekistan) 2024	Did not qualify							
Total	5/10	18	4	2	12	47	77	-30

=== AFC Futsal Asian Cup ===
AFC Futsal Asian Cup									Qualification							
Year	Round	M	W	D	L	GF	GA	GD	M	W	D	L	GF	GA	GD	Link
(Malaysia) 1999	Fourth Place	5	1	3	1	18	18	0	No qualification							
(Thailand) 2000	Fourth Place	6	3	0	3	36	26	+10	No qualification							
(Iran) 2001	Fourth Place	7	2	1	4	25	29	-4	No qualification							
(Indonesia) 2002	Runners-up	7	6	0	1	20	10	+10	No qualification							
(Iran) 2003	Runners-up	6	5	0	1	37	9	+28	No qualification							
(Macau) 2004	Runners-up	7	6	0	1	49	10	+39	No qualification							
(Vietnam) 2005	Runners-up	8	7	0	1	48	9	+39	No qualification							
(Uzbekistan) 2006	Champions	5	5	0	0	35	8	+27	Automatically qualified							Link
(Japan) 2007	Runners-up	6	5	0	1	41	12	+29	Qualified as host							Link
(Thailand) 2008	Third Place	6	5	0	1	25	9	+16	Automatically qualified							Link
(Uzbekistan) 2010	Third Place	6	5	0	1	26	10	+16	5	4	0	1	32	9	+23	Link
(United Arab Emirates) 2012	Champions	6	6	0	0	25	5	+20	Automatically qualified							Link
(Vietnam) 2014	Champions	6	4	1	1	28	7	+21	Automatically qualified							Link
(Uzbekistan) 2016	5th place play-offs	5	3	1	1	21	12	+9	Automatically qualified							Link
(Taiwan) 2018	Runners-up	6	5	0	1	18	10	+8	3	3	0	0	24	2	+22	Link
(Turkmenistan) 2020	Qualified but cancelled due to COVID-19 pandemic								2	2	0	0	21	4	+17	Link
(Kuwait) 2022	Champions	6	5	0	1	17	7	+10	4	4	0	0	42	3	+39	Link
(Thailand) 2024	Group Stage	3	1	1	1	8	4	+4	2	2	0	0	7	0	+7	Link
(Indonesia) 2026	Semi-finals	5	4	0	1	20	8	+12	3	3	0	0	21	1	+20	Link
Total:18/18	4 Titles	106	78	7	21	497	203	+294	19	18	0	1	147	19	+128	–

- In 2010 Automatically qualified but was played in 5 matches (EAFF Futsal Championship).

==== AFC Futsal Asian Cup Results ====
AFC Futsal Asian Cup history
Year	Round	Score	Result
1999	Round 1	Japan 5–5 Malaysia	Draw
1999	Round 1	Japan 4–1 Kazakhstan	Win
1999	Round 1	Japan 5–5 Uzbekistan	Draw
1999	Semi-finals	Japan 2–5 Iran	Loss
1999	Third place	Japan 2–2 (3–4)p Kazakhstan	Loss
2000	Round 1	Japan 4–2 Uzbekistan	Win
2000	Round 1	Japan 2–6 Iran	Loss
2000	Round 1	Japan 12–1 Macau	Win
2000	Round 1	Japan 6–0 Kyrgyzstan	Win
2000	Semi-finals	Japan 6–9 Kazakhstan	Loss
2000	Third place	Japan 6–8 Thailand	Loss
2001	Round 1	Japan 6–5 Chinese Taipei	Win
2001	Round 1	Japan 8–1 Singapore	Win
2001	Round 1	Japan 2–3 Palestine	Loss
2001	Round 1	Japan 4–8 Iran	Loss
2001	Quarter-finals	Japan 2–2 (7–6)p Kazakhstan	Win
2001	Semi-finals	Japan 2–8 Iran	Loss
2001	Third place	Japan 1–2 South Korea	Loss
2002	Round 1	Japan 5–1 Indonesia	Win
2002	Round 1	Japan 2–1 Kyrgyzstan	Win
2002	Round 1	Japan 7–2 China	Win
2002	Round 1	Japan 2–0 Kuwait	Win
2002	Quarter-finals	Japan 1–0 Uzbekistan	Win
2002	Semi-finals	Japan 3–0 Thailand	Win
2002	Final	Japan 0–6 Iran	Loss
2003	Round 1	Japan 4–0 Palestine	Win
2003	Round 1	Japan 14–1 Macau	Win
2003	Round 1	Japan 5–0 Kuwait	Win
2003	Quarter-finals	Japan 7–0 Chinese Taipei	Win
2003	Semi-finals	Japan 3–2 (a.e.t) Thailand	Win
2003	Final	Japan 4–6 Iran	Loss
2004	Round 1	Japan 4–0 Lebanon	Win
2004	Round 1	Japan 4–1 Kyrgyzstan	Win
2004	Round 1	Japan 12–0 Philippines	Win
2004	Round 1	Japan 17–0 Macau	Win
2004	Quarter-finals	Japan 5–2 China	Win
2004	Semi-finals	Japan 4–2 Uzbekistan	Win
2004	Final	Japan 3–5 Iran	Loss
2005	Round 1	Japan 18–0 Guam	Win
2005	Round 1	Japan 7–0 Malaysia	Win
2005	Round 1	Japan 7–0 Indonesia	Win
2005	Round 2	Japan 3–1 Iran	Win
2005	Round 2	Japan 5–1 China	Win
2005	Round 2	Japan 4–2 Thailand	Win
2005	Semi-finals	Japan 4–3 Kyrgyzstan	Win
2005	Final	Japan 0–2 Iran	Loss
2006	Round 1	Japan 12–0 Hong Kong	Win
2006	Round 1	Japan 2–0 Iraq	Win
2006	Round 1	Japan 11–6 Tajikistan	Win
2006	Semi-finals	Japan 5–1 Iran	Win
2006	Final	Japan 5–1 Uzbekistan	Win
2007	Round 1	Japan 16–0 Philippines	Win
2007	Round 1	Japan 8–0 Hong Kong	Win
2007	Round 1	Japan 6–2 Tajikistan	Win
2007	Quarter-finals	Japan 9–6 Thailand	Win
2007	Semi-finals	Japan 1–0 Kyrgyzstan	Win
2007	Final	Japan 1–4 Iran	Loss
2008	Round 1	Japan 8–2 Chinese Taipei	Win
2008	Round 1	Japan 4–1 Turkmenistan	Win
2008	Round 1	Japan 4–2 Australia	Win
2008	Quarter-finals	Japan 4–0 Kyrgyzstan	Win
2008	Semi-finals	Japan 0–1 Iran	Loss
2008	Third Place	Japan 5–3 China	Win
2010	Round 1	Japan 5–1 China	Win
2010	Round 1	Japan 10–1 Iraq	Win
2010	Round 1	Japan 1–0 Turkmenistan	Win
2010	Quarter-finals	Japan 4–0 Kyrgyzstan	Win
2010	Semi-finals	Japan 0–7 Iran	Loss
2010	Third Place	Japan 6–1 China	Win
2012	Round 1	Japan 3–2 Lebanon	Win
2012	Round 1	Japan 6–1 Tajikistan	Win
2012	Round 1	Japan 6–1 Chinese Taipei	Win
2012	Quarter-finals	Japan 1–0 Kyrgyzstan	Win
2012	Semi-finals	Japan 3–0 Australia	Win
2012	Final	Japan 6–1 Thailand	Win
2014	Round 1	Japan 12–0 South Korea	Win
2014	Round 1	Japan 1–2 Uzbekistan	Loss
2014	Round 1	Japan 4–0 Kyrgyzstan	Win
2014	Quarter-finals	Japan 3–2 Thailand	Win
2014	Semi-finals	Japan 6–1 Kuwait	Win
2014	Final	Japan 2–2(3–0)p Iran	Win
2016	Round 1	Japan 1–0 Qatar	Win
2016	Round 1	Japan 11–1 Malaysia	Win
2016	Round 1	Japan 3–1 Australia	Win
2016	Quarter-finals	Japan 4–4(1–2)p Vietnam	Loss
2016	Fifth Place	Japan 2–6 Kyrgyzstan	Loss
2018	Round 1	Japan 4–2 Tajikistan	Win
2018	Round 1	Japan 5–2 South Korea	Win
2018	Round 1	Japan 4–2 Uzbekistan	Win
2018	Quarter-finals	Japan 2–0 Bahrain	Win
2018	Semi-finals	Japan 3–0 Iraq	Win
2018	Final	Japan 0–4 Iran	Loss
2022	Round 1	Japan 1–2 Saudi Arabia	Loss
2022	Round 1	Japan 6–0 South Korea	Win
2022	Round 1	Japan 2–0 Vietnam	Win
2022	Quarter-finals	Japan 3–2 Indonesia	Win
2022	Semi-finals	Japan 2–1 Uzbekistan	Win
2022	Final	Japan 3–2 Iran	Win
2024	Round 1	Japan 2–3 Kyrgyzstan	Loss
2024	Round 1	Japan 5–0 South Korea	Win
2024	Round 1	Japan 1–1 Tajikistan	Draw
2026	Round 1	Japan 6–2 Australia	Win
2026	Round 1	Japan 3–0 Tajikistan	Win
2026	Round 1	Japan 2–1 Uzbekistan	Win
2026	Quarter-finals	Japan 6–0 Afghanistan	Win
2026	Semi-finals	Japan 3–5 Indonesia	Loss

=== Asian Indoor and Martial Arts Games ===
Asian Indoor and Martial Arts Games record
Year	Round	Pld	W	D	L	GF	GA	GD
(Thailand) 2005	did not enter							
(Macau) 2007	Quarter-final	4	2	1	1	6	2	+4
(Vietnam) 2009	Quarter-final	3	1	0	2	10	11	-1
(South Korea) 2013	Runners-up	5	4	0	1	19	15	+4
(Turkmenistan) 2017	Third Place	5	3	2	0	19	11	+8
Total	4/5	17	10	3	4	54	39	+15

=== Grand Prix de Futsal ===
Grand Prix de Futsal record
Year	Round	Pld	W	D*	L	GS	GA
(Brazil) 2005	did not enter						
(Brazil) 2006	did not enter						
(Brazil) 2007	did not enter						
(Brazil) 2008	did not enter						
(Brazil) 2009	did not enter						
(Brazil) 2010	did not enter						
(Brazil) 2011	did not enter						
(Brazil) 2013	Eighth Place	4	0	0	4	8	19
(Brazil) 2014	did not enter						
(Brazil) 2015	did not enter						
(Brazil) 2018	did not enter						
Total	1/11	4	0	0	4	8	19

=== Futsal Confederations Cup ===
Futsal Confederations Cup record
Year	Round	Pld	W	D*	L	GS	GA
(Libya) 2009	did not enter						
(Brazil) 2013	did not enter						
(Kuwait) 2014	Sixth Place	3	1	0	2	6	9
Total	1/3	3	1	0	2	6	9

== Head-to-head record ==
The following table shows Japan's head-to-head record in the FIFA Futsal World Cup.

Opponent	Pld	W	D	L	GF	GA	GD	Win %
Angola	1	1	0	0	8	4	+4	100.00
Argentina	1	0	0	1	1	2	−1	0.00
Belgium	1	0	0	1	0	3	−3	0.00
Brazil	3	0	0	3	4	20	−16	0.00
Canada	1	0	0	1	2	6	−4	0.00
Cuba	1	1	0	0	4	1	+3	100.00
Italy	1	0	0	1	0	5	−5	0.00
Libya	1	1	0	0	4	2	+2	100.00
Paraguay	2	0	0	2	5	7	−2	0.00
Portugal	1	0	1	0	5	5	+0	0.00
Russia	1	0	0	1	1	9	−8	0.00
Solomon Islands	1	1	0	0	7	2	+5	100.00
Spain	1	0	0	1	2	4	−2	0.00
Ukraine	1	0	0	1	3	6	−3	0.00
United States	1	0	1	0	1	1	+0	0.00
Total	18	4	2	12	47	77	−30	22.22

== World ranking ==
As of 8 May 2026, the top 10 AFC teams according to FIFA are:

FIFA	AFC	Nation	Points
5	1	Iran	1507.71
11	2	Thailand	1354.78
12	3	Japan	1315.11
14	4	Indonesia	1269.82
21	5	Afghanistan	1194.68
22	6	Vietnam	1191.44
23	7	Uzbekistan	1187.74
24	8	Iraq	1186.90
41	9	Saudi Arabia	1083.52
43	10	Kuwait	1080.32

As of 8 May 2026

== See also ==
Japan
Men's

- International footballers
- National football team (Results (2020–present))
- National under-23 football team
- National under-20 football team
- National under-17 football team
- National futsal team
- National under-20 futsal team
- National beach soccer team

Women's

- International footballers
- National football team (Results)
- National under-20 football team
- National under-17 football team
- National futsal team

Preceded by 2005 Iran	Asian Champions; 2006 (First title)	Succeeded by 2007 Iran
Preceded by 2010 Iran	Asian Champions; 2012 (Second title); 2014 (Third title)	Succeeded by 2016 Iran
