= 2026 AFC Futsal Asian Cup squads =

List of the national futsal squads that take part in the 2026 AFC Futsal Asian Cup

The following is a list of squads for each national team competing at the 2026 AFC Futsal Asian Cup. The tournament will be held in Indonesia from 27 January to 7 February 2026. The 16 national teams involved in the tournament were required by the AFC to register a squad of 14 players, including two goalkeepers.

== Group A ==
=== Indonesia ===
The Indonesia Futsal Federation first announced 19-men preliminary squad to participate in the national team's training camp on 30 November 2025. The final 14-men squad was announced on 24 January 2026.

Head coach: (Spain) Héctor Souto

No.	Pos.	Player	Date of birth (age)	Club
1	GK	Muhammad Nizar	17 February 1995 (aged 30)	(Football Association of Indonesia) Pangsuma
2	GK	Ahmad Habiebie	21 June 2000 (aged 25)	(Football Association of Indonesia) Bintang Timur
3	DF	Rizki Xavier	15 January 1999 (aged 27)	(Football Association of Indonesia) Cosmo
8	DF	Ardiansyah Nur	27 August 1997 (aged 28)	(Football Association of Indonesia) Black Steel
9	DF	Rio Pangestu	30 August 1997 (aged 28)	(Football Association of Indonesia) Bintang Timur
12	DF	Dewa Rizki	16 January 2001 (aged 25)	(Football Association of Indonesia) Cosmo
4	MF	Iqbal Iskandar (captain)	23 August 1995 (aged 30)	(Football Association of Indonesia) Bintang Timur
7	MF	Syauqi Saud	29 January 1997 (aged 28)	(Football Association of Indonesia) Bintang Timur
10	MF	Firman Adriansyah	9 February 2000 (aged 25)	(Football Association of Indonesia) Bintang Timur
11	MF	Reza Gunawan	25 October 1998 (aged 27)	(Football Association of Indonesia) Cosmo
13	MF	Brian Ick	14 October 1999 (aged 26)	(Football Association of Indonesia) Black Steel
14	MF	Yogi Saputra	17 June 2003 (aged 22)	(Football Association of Indonesia) Pangsuma
5	FW	Israr Megantara	30 October 2004 (aged 21)	(Football Association of Indonesia) Cosmo
6	FW	Samuel Eko	16 May 1998 (aged 27)	(Football Association of Indonesia) Bintang Timur

=== Iraq ===
The final squad was announced by the AFC on 26 January 2026.

Head coach: (Brazil) João Carlos Barbosa

No.	Pos.	Player	Date of birth (age)	Caps	Goals	Club
1	GK	Hussein Ahmed Naser	20 June 1997 (aged 28)	9	0	(Iraq Football Association) Masafi Al-Wasat
2	GK	Ibrahim Ahmed Al-Bustani	19 July 2001 (aged 24)	3	0	(Iraq Football Association) Basra Oil
12	GK	Layth Mohammed				
3	FP	Hayder Ali	3 January 2000 (aged 26)	0	0	(Iraq Football Association) Degla
4	FP	Hani Saad	16 May 2006 (aged 19)	0	0	(Iraq Football Association) Basra Municipality
5	FP	Mustafa Ihsan	1 December 1997 (aged 28)	17	8	(Iraq Football Association) Al-Shorta
6	FP	Harith Saad	31 March 2003 (aged 22)	10	2	(Iraq Football Association) Army
7	FP	Salim Faisal	16 January 1995 (aged 31)	50	25	(Iraq Football Association) Basra Oil
8	FP	Ghaith Riyadh	4 December 1999 (aged 26)	40	5	(Iraq Football Association) Degla
9	FP	Salim Kadhim	2 April 2003 (aged 22)	6	5	(Iraq Football Association) Masafi Al-Wasat
10	FP	Mohanad Abdul-Hadi	6 February 2002 (aged 23)	18	2	(Iraq Football Association) Al-Shorta
11	FP	Haedr Majed	30 January 1997 (aged 28)	30	8	(Iraq Football Association) Basra Oil
13	FP	Tareq Zeyad	1 January 1996 (aged 30)	36	11	(Iraq Football Association) Al-Shorta
14	FP	Ali Ayad	6 April 1997 (aged 28)	0	0	(Iraq Football Association) Baghdad Municipality

=== Kyrgyzstan ===
The final squad was announced by the AFC on 26 January 2026.

Head coach: Nurjan Djetybaev

No.	Pos.	Player	Date of birth (age)	Club
1	GK	Ulanbek Chorobek uulu	1 August 2004 (aged 21)	(Uzbekistan Football Association) Nasaf
2	GK	Bekbolot Akmataliev	13 November 1994 (aged 31)	(Football Federation of Armenia) Unisport
3	FP	Donierbek Amanbaev	10 October 1997 (aged 28)	(Uzbekistan Football Association) Nasaf
4	FP	Bektur Iliasov	16 December 2003 (aged 22)	(Kyrgyz Football Union) Art Blast
5	FP	Erbol Doolotov	28 November 2007 (aged 18)	(Football Federation of Armenia) Unisport
6	FP	Baatyrkhan Zhumadilov	10 September 2005 (aged 20)	(Kyrgyz Football Union) Art Blast
7	FP	Shokhrukh Makhmadaminov	16 July 1998 (aged 27)	(Russian Football Union) Torpedo
8	FP	Islam Turatbekov	17 February 2005 (aged 20)	(Kyrgyz Football Union) Toyota
9	FP	Maksat Alimov	3 August 1990 (aged 35)	(Kyrgyz Football Union) Art Blast
10	FP	Argen Abdurashit uulu	13 September 2002 (aged 23)	(Kyrgyz Football Union) Art Blast
11	FP	Daniiar Talaibekov	24 October 1998 (aged 27)	(Kyrgyz Football Union) Art Blast
12	FP	Arhat Medetbekov	28 April 2006 (aged 19)	(Russian Football Union) Sinara-2
13	FP	Kairat Kubanychov	16 June 1999 (aged 26)	(Kyrgyz Football Union) Naryn
14	FP	Samat Dzhanat uulu	11 September 2002 (aged 23)	(Kyrgyz Football Union) Art Blast

=== South Korea ===
The final squad was announced by the KFA on 17 January 2026.

Head coach: (Portugal) Paulo Fernandes

No.	Pos.	Player	Date of birth (age)	Club
1	GK	Jeong Joo-ho	19 April 1994 (aged 31)	(Korea Football Association) Yongin Daeheung
12	GK	Lee Jin-woo	7 June 2001 (aged 24)	(Korea Football Association) Goyang Bulls
4	DF	Kang Ju-kwang	17 August 1994 (aged 31)	(Korea Football Association) Yongin Daeheung
9	DF	Hwang Un	4 September 1988 (aged 37)	(Korea Football Association) Gyeonggi
10	DF	Shin Hai-il	12 October 1995 (aged 30)	(Korea Football Association) Yongin Daeheung
14	DF	Yoo Seung-mu	23 September 1989 (aged 36)	(Korea Football Association) Gyeonggi
2	MF	Kim Eun-soo	19 July 1999 (aged 26)	(Korea Football Association) Gyeonggi
5	MF	Eom Ji-yong	9 July 2003 (aged 22)	(Korea Football Association) Goyang Bulls
6	MF	Lee Jun-won	14 February 1994 (aged 31)	(Korea Football Association) Gyeonggi
7	MF	Eom Si-jun	18 June 1996 (aged 29)	(Korea Football Association) Gyeonggi
11	MF	Kim Joo-ho	7 April 1997 (aged 28)	(Korea Football Association) Yongin Daeheung
13	MF	Kim Min-seong	18 April 1998 (aged 27)	(Korea Football Association) Nowon Xenor
3	FW	Choi Hyun-bin	28 February 1996 (aged 29)	(Korea Football Association) Goyang Bulls
8	FW	Kim Gun-woo	3 April 1998 (aged 27)	(Korea Football Association) Gyeonggi

== Group B ==
=== Thailand ===
The final squad was announced on 24 January 2026.

Head coach: Rakphol Sainetngam

No.	Pos.	Player	Date of birth (age)	Club
1	GK	Arut Senbat	26 November 1988 (aged 37)	(Football Association of Thailand) Blackpearl United
2	GK	Nuttapong Yeemarep	9 September 1993 (aged 32)	(Football Association of Thailand) Port Futsal Club
5	DF	Ronnachai Jungwongsuk	4 March 1997 (aged 28)	(Football Association of Thailand) Bluewave Chonburi
6	DF	Itticha Praphaphan (captain)	31 December 1991 (aged 34)	(Football Association of Thailand) Port Futsal Club
7	DF	Narongsak Wingwon	18 February 1998 (aged 27)	(Football Association of Thailand) Hongyen Thakam
4	MF	Krit Aransanyalak	27 March 2001 (aged 24)	(Football Association of Thailand) Bluewave Chonburi
8	MF	Panat Kittipanuwong	14 May 1998 (aged 27)	(Football Association of Thailand) Chonburi Bluewave
10	MF	Mintada Piromyu	21 July 2004 (aged 21)	(Football Association of Thailand) Phetchaburi Rajabhat University
12	MF	Amarin Akapan	15 April 2002 (aged 23)	(Football Association of Thailand) Hongyen Thakam
13	MF	Therdsak Charoenphong	23 November 1996 (aged 29)	(Football Association of Thailand) Hongyen Thakam
14	MF	Chaowala Sriarwut	24 September 1999 (aged 26)	(Football Association of Thailand) Hongyen Thakam
3	FW	Worasak Srirangpiroat	26 December 1992 (aged 33)	(Football Association of Thailand) Hongyen Thakam
9	FW	Sarawut Phalaphruek	9 June 1997 (aged 28)	(Football Association of Thailand) Hongyen Thakam
11	FW	Muhammad Osamanmusa	19 January 1998 (aged 28)	(Royal Spanish Football Federation) Cartagena

=== Vietnam ===
Vietnam announced their 19-men preliminary squad in 29 December 2025. The final squad was announced on 23 January 2026.

Head coach: (Argentina) Diego Giustozzi

No.	Pos.	Player	Date of birth (age)	Club
1	GK	Phạm Văn Tú	7 April 1997 (aged 28)	(Vietnam Football Federation) Thái Sơn Bắc
2	GK	Trần Văn Lương	14 December 2003 (aged 22)	(Vietnam Football Federation) Thai Son Nam
3	DF	Trần Quang Nguyên	12 January 2006 (aged 20)	(Vietnam Football Federation) Thái Sơn Bắc
5	DF	Nguyễn Mạnh Dũng (captain)	9 June 1997 (aged 28)	(Vietnam Football Federation) Thai Son Nam
13	DF	Nhan Gia Hưng	13 July 2002 (aged 23)	(Vietnam Football Federation) Thai Son Nam
14	DF	Đinh Công Viên	7 January 2002 (aged 24)	(Vietnam Football Federation) Thai Son Nam
4	MF	Châu Đoàn Phát	14 March 1999 (aged 26)	(Vietnam Football Federation) Thai Son Nam
6	MF	Dương Ngọc Linh	20 May 1997 (aged 28)	(Vietnam Football Federation) Thai Son Nam
8	MF	Trịnh Công Đại	16 March 2005 (aged 20)	(Vietnam Football Federation) Thái Sơn Bắc
9	MF	Trần Thái Huy	12 October 1995 (aged 30)	(Vietnam Football Federation) Thai Son Nam
11	MF	Vũ Ngọc Ánh	22 February 2004 (aged 21)	(Vietnam Football Federation) Thái Sơn Bắc
12	MF	Từ Minh Quang	1 November 1998 (aged 27)	(Vietnam Football Federation) Thái Sơn Bắc
7	FW	Nguyễn Đa Hải	13 August 2005 (aged 20)	(Vietnam Football Federation) Thái Sơn Bắc
10	FW	Nguyễn Thịnh Phát	10 June 1997 (aged 28)	(Vietnam Football Federation) Thai Son Nam

=== Kuwait ===
The final squad was announced on 26 January 2026.

Head coach: (Spain) Bruno García Formoso

No.	Pos.	Player	Date of birth (age)	Club
1	GK	Khaled Abdullah	13 April 1995 (aged 30)	(Kuwait Football Association) Al-Arabi
2	GK	Fahad Al-Khawari	6 January 1995 (aged 31)	(Kuwait Football Association) Kazma
3	DF	Mohammad Al-Ajmi	21 January 2000 (aged 26)	(Kuwait Football Association) Al-Tadamon
6	DF	Al-Aziz Borashed	24 December 2001 (aged 24)	(Kuwait Football Association) Al-Tadamon
7	DF	Saleh Al-Fadhel	20 January 1995 (aged 31)	(Kuwait Football Association) Kazma
8	DF	Najeeb Ali	20 April 1995 (aged 30)	(Kuwait Football Association) Kuwait
13	DF	Salman Al-Baeijan	5 March 1996 (aged 29)	(Kuwait Football Association) Al-Arabi
4	MF	Ahmad Al-Farsi	30 November 1989 (aged 36)	(Kuwait Football Association) Kazma
9	MF	Abdullah Al-Hasawi	19 February 2003 (aged 22)	(Kuwait Football Association) Qadsia
12	MF	Omar Al-Shatti	14 November 1995 (aged 30)	(Kuwait Football Association) Al-Arabi
14	MF	Abdullah Thamer	4 August 1996 (aged 29)	(Kuwait Football Association) Al-Yarmouk
5	FW	Abdulaziz Al-Sarraj	3 October 1995 (aged 30)	(Kuwait Football Association) Kuwait
10	FW	Abduellteif Al-Abasi	2 December 1995 (aged 30)	(Kuwait Football Association) Kuwait
11	FW	Ahmad Al-Shatti	1 February 1998 (aged 27)	(Kuwait Football Association) Al-Arabi

=== Lebanon ===
The final squad was announced on 23 January 2026.

Head coach: (Spain) Ricardo Íñiguez

No.	Pos.	Player	Date of birth (age)	Club
1	GK	Karim Joueidi	6 June 1997 (aged 28)	(Lebanese Football Association) Central Jounieh
2	GK	Giorgio Makhoul	22 March 2002 (aged 23)	(Lebanese Football Association) Nejmeh
3	DF	Mohamad Ossman	4 April 1992 (aged 33)	(Lebanese Football Association) Army
5	DF	Ali Hamam	5 February 2002 (aged 23)	(Lebanese Football Association) Beirut Stars
11	DF	Mario Abou Jaoude	6 November 1996 (aged 29)	(Lebanese Football Association) NSK
4	MF	Ali Jammoul	15 January 2005 (aged 21)	(Lebanese Football Association) Nejmeh
6	MF	Majd Hamouch	23 October 2000 (aged 25)	(Lebanese Football Association) Central Jounieh
9	MF	Mustafa Rhyem	1 October 1993 (aged 32)	(Lebanese Football Association) Nejmeh
10	MF	Mohsen Mohsen	13 June 2005 (aged 20)	(Lebanese Football Association) Nejmeh
12	MF	Abed Sous	1 February 2003 (aged 22)	(Lebanese Football Association) Mabarrah
7	FW	Hassan Maatouk	18 December 2002 (aged 23)	(Lebanese Football Association) Beirut Stars
8	FW	Hadi Cheaito	5 March 2003 (aged 22)	(Lebanese Football Association) Sporting 1875
13	FW	Najib El-Kallab	26 August 2005 (aged 20)	(Lebanese Football Association) Beirut Stars
14	FW	John Jabbour	2 September 1996 (aged 29)	(Lebanese Football Association) Nejmeh

== Group C ==
=== Japan ===
The final squad was announced on 7 January 2026.

Head coach: Kensuke Takahashi

No.	Pos.	Player	Date of birth (age)	Club
1	GK	Fábio Fiúza	26 January 1987 (aged 39)	(Japan Football Association) Shonan Bellmare
2	GK	Hiroshi Tabuchi	18 June 1999 (aged 26)	(Japan Football Association) Nagoya Oceans
3	DF	Shunta Uchimura	1 August 1991 (aged 34)	(Japan Football Association) Shonan Bellmare
4	DF	Kentaro Ishida	1 January 1998 (aged 28)	(Japan Football Association) Nagoya Oceans
5	DF	Kaito Yamada	30 March 2000 (aged 25)	(Japan Football Association) Shinagawa City
8	DF	Ryuji Izu	28 July 2004 (aged 21)	(Japan Football Association) Nagoya Oceans
6	MF	Tomoki Yoshikawa	3 February 1989 (aged 36)	(Japan Football Association) Nagoya Oceans
7	MF	Shoto Yamanaka	30 July 2002 (aged 23)	(Japan Football Association) Pescadola Machida
10	MF	Shunta Uchida	27 January 1997 (aged 29)	(Royal Spanish Football Federation) Entrerríos Zaragoza
12	MF	Kokoro Harada	1 July 2004 (aged 21)	(Royal Spanish Football Federation) FS García
13	MF	Ryoto Kai	20 July 2001 (aged 24)	(Japan Football Association) Pescadola Machida
9	FW	Takehiro Motoishi	29 September 1999 (aged 26)	(Japan Football Association) Bardral Urayasu
11	FW	Kazuya Shimizu	6 February 1997 (aged 28)	(Japan Football Association) Nagoya Oceans
14	FW	Yusei Arai	1 November 1995 (aged 30)	(Japan Football Association) Shinagawa City

=== Uzbekistan ===
The final squad was announced on 21 January 2026.

Head coach: Nodir Elibaev

No.	Pos.	Player	Date of birth (age)	Club
1	GK	Shavkat Ibragimov	24 July 1996 (aged 29)	(Uzbekistan Football Association) Oil Star
12	GK	Abbos Elmurodov	4 September 1998 (aged 27)	(Uzbekistan Football Association) BMB
2	DF	Anaskhon Rakhmatov	20 June 1994 (aged 31)	(Uzbekistan Football Association) Nasaf
5	DF	Sunatulla Juraev	24 December 1994 (aged 31)	(Uzbekistan Football Association) Nasaf
6	DF	Ilkhomjon Khamroev	25 September 1997 (aged 28)	(Uzbekistan Football Association) Oil Star
3	MF	Abror Akhmetzyanov	22 May 2004 (aged 21)	(Uzbekistan Football Association) SQB
4	MF	Ikhtiyor Ropiev	19 September 1993 (aged 32)	(Uzbekistan Football Association) Nasaf
7	MF	Akbar Usmonov	9 March 1997 (aged 28)	(Uzbekistan Football Association) SQB
8	MF	Khayrullo Solikhov	26 March 2000 (aged 25)	(Uzbekistan Football Association) OKMK
10	MF	Shakhram Fakhriddinov	29 May 2002 (aged 23)	(Uzbekistan Football Association) OKMK
13	MF	Eldor Nigmatov	16 October 2001 (aged 24)	(Uzbekistan Football Association) Lokomotiv
14	MF	Samariddin Berkinov	18 July 2000 (aged 25)	(Uzbekistan Football Association) Oil Star
9	FW	Elbek Tulkinov	24 December 2000 (aged 25)	(Uzbekistan Football Association) Oil Star
11	FW	Muzaffar Akhmadjonov	8 November 1997 (aged 28)	(Uzbekistan Football Association) BMB

=== Tajikistan ===
The final squad was announced on 26 January 2026.

Head coach: Pairav Vohidov

No.	Pos.	Player	Date of birth (age)	Club
1	GK	Firuz Bekmurodov	10 January 1998 (aged 28)	(Tajikistan Football Federation) Sipar Khujand
2	GK	Nuriddin Dzhabarov	2 March 2002 (aged 23)	(Tajikistan Football Federation) Soro
4	DF	Nasratsho Ismoilov	20 January 2002 (aged 24)	(Tajikistan Football Federation) Istiklol
8	DF	Muhamadjon Sharipov	14 September 1998 (aged 27)	(Tajikistan Football Federation) Sipar Khujand
14	DF	Dilshod Salomov	5 October 1995 (aged 30)	(Tajikistan Football Federation) Soro
3	MF	Iqboli Vositzoda	8 May 1998 (aged 27)	(Tajikistan Football Federation) Sipar Khujand
9	MF	Muhammad Rajabov	1 November 1999 (aged 26)	(Tajikistan Football Federation) Soro
12	MF	Nekruz Idiev	28 August 2001 (aged 24)	(Tajikistan Football Federation) Istiklol
5	FW	Samandar Rizomov	5 January 2001 (aged 25)	(Tajikistan Football Federation) Soro
6	FW	Idris Yorov	18 September 2000 (aged 25)	(Uzbekistan Football Association) Bukhara
7	FW	Bahodur Khojaev	26 April 1995 (aged 30)	(Uzbekistan Football Association) Bukhara
10	FW	Umed Kuziev	17 December 1997 (aged 28)	(Tajikistan Football Federation) Amonatbonk
11	FW	Komron Aliev	8 February 2001 (aged 24)	(Tajikistan Football Federation) Istiklol
13	FW	Bakhtiyor Soliev	16 December 2001 (aged 24)	(Tajikistan Football Federation) Soro

=== Australia ===
The final squad was announced on 13 January 2026.

Head coach: Miles Downie

No.	Pos.	Player	Date of birth (age)	Club
1	GK	Aaron Yu	17 October 1994 (aged 31)	(Football Australia) Fitzroy Tigers
12	GK	Noah Feilich	12 September 2002 (aged 23)	(Football Australia) Eastern Suburbs Hakoah
2	DF	Tyler Garner	8 October 2000 (aged 25)	(Football Australia) Rockingham Cambio Cumbre
3	DF	César Casado	5 December 1995 (aged 30)	(Royal Spanish Football Federation) Rivas Futsal
5	DF	Jordan Guerreiro	23 August 1994 (aged 31)	(Football Australia) Mountain Majik
14	DF	Jamie Dib	14 August 1996 (aged 29)	(Football Australia) Mountain Majik
4	MF	Dominic Cox	4 August 1996 (aged 29)	(Football Australia) Sydney Allstars
6	MF	Wade Giovenali	15 August 1994 (aged 31)	(Football Australia) Dural Warriors
7	MF	Scott Rogan	29 September 1998 (aged 27)	(Football Australia) Fitzroy Tigers
8	MF	Ahmed Sweedan	14 June 2000 (aged 25)	(Football Australia) Moreland
10	MF	Ethan De Melo	23 December 2002 (aged 23)	(Football Australia) Mascot Vipers
11	MF	Jyden Harb	2 December 2005 (aged 20)	(Football Australia) Sydney Allstars
9	FW	Grant Lynch	4 August 1993 (aged 32)	(Football Australia) UTS Northside
13	FW	Michael Kouta	9 April 1997 (aged 28)	(Football Australia) Sydney Allstars

== Group D ==
=== Iran ===
The final squad was announced on 21 January 2026.

Head coach: Vahid Shamsaei

No.	Pos.	Player	Date of birth (age)	Club
1	GK	Bagher Mohammadi	21 June 1991 (aged 34)	
2	GK	Mahdi Rostami	3 March 2000 (aged 25)	
3	DF	Amirhossein Gholami	2 April 2001 (aged 24)	
4	DF	Hossein Sabzi	13 April 2000 (aged 25)	
5	DF	Mohammadhossein Derakhshani	1 April 1993 (aged 32)	
6	MF	Mehdi Mehdikhani	12 December 2000 (aged 25)	
7	MF	Mahdi Karimi	28 January 1997 (aged 28)	
8	MF	Moslem Oladghobad	29 November 1995 (aged 30)	
11	MF	Ali Khalilvand	10 September 1997 (aged 28)	
12	MF	Salar Aghapour	7 March 2000 (aged 25)	
13	MF	Masoud Yousef	27 October 2000 (aged 25)	
9	FW	Saeid Ahmadabbasi	31 July 1992 (aged 33)	
10	FW	Hossein Tayyebi	29 September 1988 (aged 37)	
14	FW	Behrooz Azimi	25 August 2001 (aged 24)	

=== Afghanistan ===
The final squad was announced on 24 January 2026.

Head coach: (Iran) Majid Mortezaei

No.	Pos.	Player	Date of birth (age)	Club
1	GK	Mohammad Javad Safari	16 March 2000 (aged 25)	(Football Federation Islamic Republic of Iran) Giti Pasand Isfahan
2	GK	Ali Mohseni	3 June 2003 (aged 22)	(Afghanistan Football Federation) Sadaqat
3	DF	Hamid Reza Hosseini	30 September 2000 (aged 25)	(Afghanistan Football Federation) Saadat Nimrooz
6	DF	Khodadad Ebrahimi	2 March 2004 (aged 21)	(Afghanistan Football Federation) Sadaqat
7	DF	Reza Hosseinpour	23 August 1999 (aged 26)	(Afghanistan Football Federation) Asree Jadid
4	MF	Sayed Murtaza Hussaini	5 March 2008 (aged 17)	(Football Federation Islamic Republic of Iran) Foolad Zarand
5	MF	Hussain Mohammadi	28 January 2005 (aged 20)	(Football Federation Islamic Republic of Iran) Farsh Ara Mashhad
8	MF	Abbas Heydari	4 January 2009 (aged 17)	(Afghanistan Football Federation) Sadaqat
11	MF	Mohammad Moradi	22 May 2005 (aged 20)	(Football Federation Islamic Republic of Iran) Giti Pasand Isfahan
12	MF	Farzad Mahmoodi	14 April 1999 (aged 26)	(Afghanistan Football Federation) Piroze Panjsher
9	FW	Omid Qanbari	29 June 2004 (aged 21)	(Afghanistan Football Federation) Sadaqat
10	FW	Akbar Kazemi	13 May 1996 (aged 29)	(Afghanistan Football Federation) Sadaqat
13	FW	Seyed Hossein Mousavi	13 March 2001 (aged 24)	(Football Federation Islamic Republic of Iran) Shahrdari Saveh
14	FW	Sayed Mojtaba Husseini	6 October 2003 (aged 22)	(Afghanistan Football Federation) Saadat Nimrooz

=== Saudi Arabia ===
The final squad was announced on 27 January 2026.

Head coach: (Spain) Andreu Plaza Álvarez

No.	Pos.	Player	Date of birth (age)	Club
1	GK	Humood Al-Dahhan	29 October 1998 (aged 27)	(Saudi Arabian Football Federation) Al-Ula
2	GK	Mohammed Abdulmohsen	21 June 1990 (aged 35)	(Saudi Arabian Football Federation) Al Qadsiah
3	FW	Nasser Al-Harthi	5 May 1998 (aged 27)	(Saudi Arabian Football Federation) Al Qadsiah
4	FW	Nawaf Aroan	31 March 1996 (aged 29)	(Saudi Arabian Football Federation) Al-Thoqbah
5	FW	Fahad Al-Johani	26 June 1999 (aged 26)	(Saudi Arabian Football Federation) Al-Ula
6	FW	Abdullah Al-Maghrabi	12 November 1997 (aged 28)	(Saudi Arabian Football Federation) Al Qadsiah
7	FW	Eihab Mohamed	13 June 1994 (aged 31)	(Saudi Arabian Football Federation) Al Qadsiah
8	FW	Abdulleh Al-Dossary	25 December 1998 (aged 27)	(Saudi Arabian Football Federation) Al Qadsiah
9	FW	Saleh Al-Qarni	7 July 1996 (aged 29)	(Saudi Arabian Football Federation) Al Qadsiah
10	FW	Moath Al-Asiri	6 April 1992 (aged 33)	(Saudi Arabian Football Federation) Al-Thoqbah
11	FW	Abdullah Al-Aqeeli	16 April 2001 (aged 24)	(Saudi Arabian Football Federation) Al Qadsiah
12	FW	Fahad Rudayni	27 April 1999 (aged 26)	(Saudi Arabian Football Federation) Al-Ula
13	FW	Mohsen Fqihe	28 February 1993 (aged 32)	(Saudi Arabian Football Federation) Radwa
14	FW	Farhan Al-Asmari	20 May 1996 (aged 29)	(Saudi Arabian Football Federation) Al-Ula

=== Malaysia ===
The final squad was announced by the FAM on 25 January 2026.

Head coach: Addie Azwan

No.	Pos.	Player	Date of birth (age)	Club
1	GK	Syawal Sabaruddin	10 February 1997 (aged 28)	(Football Association of Malaysia) Selangor
2	GK	Syaifuddin Syukri	7 November 1992 (aged 33)	(Football Association of Malaysia) Selangor
6	DF	Aidil Zakwan	18 September 2007 (aged 18)	(Football Association of Malaysia) Selangor
7	DF	Harith Na'im	18 January 2000 (aged 26)	(Football Association of Malaysia) Pahang Rangers
12	DF	Danial Dain	10 September 1996 (aged 29)	(Football Association of Malaysia) Johor Darul Ta'zim
14	DF	Firdaus Ambiah	2 May 1991 (aged 34)	(Football Association of Malaysia) Johor Darul Ta'zim
3	MF	Norakmal Norizal	1 June 2004 (aged 21)	(Football Association of Malaysia) Pahang Rangers
4	MF	Faris Johan	8 May 2000 (aged 25)	(Football Association of Malaysia) Selangor
8	MF	Syed Shahrul	30 October 1999 (aged 26)	(Football Association of Malaysia) Terengganu
9	MF	Khairul Effendy	3 December 1987 (aged 38)	(Football Association of Malaysia) Selangor
10	MF	Ridzwan Bakri	25 August 1994 (aged 31)	(Football Association of Malaysia) Johor Darul Ta'zim
11	MF	Saad Sani	27 February 1998 (aged 27)	(Football Association of Malaysia) Johor Darul Ta'zim
5	FW	Awalluddin Nawi	2 February 1998 (aged 27)	(Football Association of Malaysia) Johor Darul Ta'zim
13	FW	Ekmal Shahrin	13 July 2000 (aged 25)	(Football Association of Malaysia) Johor Darul Ta'zim
