= 2026 AFC Futsal Asian Cup =

International futsal competition

Piala Asia Futsal AFC 2026

Tournament details
- Host country: Indonesia
- Dates: 27 January – 7 February
- Teams: 16 (from 1 confederation)
- Venues: 2 (in 1 host city)

Final positions
- Champions: Iran (14th title)
- Runners-up: Indonesia

Tournament statistics
- Matches played: 31
- Goals scored: 166 (5.35 per match)
- Top scorer(s): (Thailand) Muhammad Osamanmusa (Japan) Kazuya Shimizu (Iran) Hossein Tayebi (6 goals each)
- Best player: (Iran) Saeid Ahmadabbasi
- Best goalkeeper: (Indonesia) Ahmad Habiebie
- Fair play award: Iraq

The 2026 AFC Futsal Asian Cup was the 18th edition of the AFC Futsal Asian Cup, the biennial international futsal championship organised by the Asian Football Confederation (AFC) for the men's national teams of Asia. Indonesia hosted the tournament for the second time after first hosting the tournament back in 2002.

Defending champions Iran successfully retained the title after winning against host Indonesia 5–4 on penalties following a 5–5 draw after extra time, and having won its record 14th title.

== Host selection ==
Initially, Pakistan and Indonesia expressed interest to host the tournament. Later, Indonesia was selected as hosts by the AFC Futsal Committee on 8 November 2024.

== Teams ==
The draw for the qualifiers was held on 26 June 2025. The host Indonesia qualified directly for the final tournament, while the other teams competed in the qualifying stage for the remaining 15 spots. The qualifiers were played between 20 September and 22 October 2025.

=== Qualified teams ===
Team	Qualification method	Date of qualification	Appearance(s)			Previous best performance (Note: Bold text indicates they hosted that edition.)
Team	Qualification method	Date of qualification	Total	First	Last	Previous best performance
Indonesia	Hosts	8 October 2024	11th	2002	2022	Quarter-finals (2022)
Australia	Group A winners	24 September 2025	9th	2006	2024	Fourth place (2012)
Thailand	Group B winners	24 September 2025	18th	1999	2024	Runners-up (2008, 2012, 2024)
Japan	Group C winners	24 September 2025	18th	1999	2024	Champions (2006, 2012, 2014, 2022)
Iraq	Group D winners	22 October 2025	14th	2001	2024	Fourth place (2018)
Vietnam	Group E winners	24 September 2025	8th	2005	2024	Fourth place (2016)
Kyrgyzstan	Group F winners	24 September 2025	17th	1999	2024	Fourth place (2005, 2006, 2007)
Iran	Group G winners	24 September 2025	18th	1999	2024	Champions (1999, 2000, 2001, 2002, 2003, 2004, 2005, 2007, 2008, 2010, 2016, 2018, 2024)
Afghanistan	Group H winners	24 September 2025	2nd	2024		Quarter-finals (2024)
Kuwait	Best runners-up	22 October 2025	14th	2001	2024	Fourth place (2003, 2014)
South Korea	2nd best runners-up	22 October 2025	15th	1999	2024	Runners-up (1999)
Uzbekistan	3rd best runners-up	22 October 2025	18th	1999	2024	Runners-up (2001, 2006, 2010, 2016)
Tajikistan	4th best runners-up	22 October 2025	13th	2001	2024	Fourth place (2024)
Saudi Arabia	5th best runners-up	22 October 2025	4th	2016	2024	Group stage (2016, 2022, 2024)
Lebanon	6th best runners-up	22 October 2025	13th	2003	2022	Quarter-finals (2004, 2007, 2008, 2010, 2012, 2014, 2018)
Malaysia	7th best runners-up	22 October 2025	13th	1999	2018	Group stage (1999, 2001, 2002, 2003, 2004, 2005, 2006, 2007, 2008, 2014, 2016, 2018)

=== Draw ===
The draw took place in Jakarta on 5 November 2025 at 14:00 local time (UTC+7).

The 16 teams were drawn into four groups of four teams. This is the first time seeding based on FIFA Futsal World Ranking instead of teams' performance at the qualification and the final of the previous edition. The host Indonesia were automatically placed in the first seed of Group A.

Pot 1	Pot 2	Pot 3	Pot 4
Indonesia (23) (hosts); Iran (5); Thailand (11); Japan (13)	Uzbekistan (19); Vietnam (26); Afghanistan (33); Iraq (41)	Kuwait (43); Tajikistan (46); Saudi Arabia (48); Kyrgyzstan (49)	Australia (53); Lebanon (54); South Korea (73); Malaysia (81)

== Venues ==
The tournament will be held at two venues in Jakarta.

The capacity of the venues listed below are the maximum capacity, as the seating of the Indonesia Arena for this tournament were reduced due to three of four telescopic seating being closed.

Jakarta		2026 AFC Futsal Asian Cup (Indonesia)
Indonesia Arena	Jakarta International Velodrome	2026 AFC Futsal Asian Cup (Indonesia)
Capacity: 16,500	Capacity: 8,500	2026 AFC Futsal Asian Cup (Indonesia)

== Referees ==
The AFC selected 10 referee pairs to officiate the tournament.

Pair (Australia) Andrew Best (Japan) Oya Tsubasa (Bahrain) Abdulrahman Al-Doseri (Turkmenistan) Timur Ramazanow (China) Liu Jianqiao (Hong Kong) Leung Chung Yin (Indonesia) Wahyu Wicaksono (Iraq) Hawkar Ahmed (Iran) Ebrahim Mehrabi (Saudi Arabia) Yahya Al-Athwani	Pair (Kuwait) Abdulaziz Al-Sarraf (Lebanon) Elias Al-Hakim (Malaysia) Helday Idan (Chinese Taipei) Lee Po-fu (Oman) Majid Al Hatmi (United Arab Emirates) Fahad Al-Hosani (Tajikistan) Sukhrob Sattorov (Uzbekistan) Anatoliy Rubakov (Thailand) Grairod Pornnarong (Vietnam) Trương Quốc Dũng

== Squads ==
Each team was required to registered a squad with a minimum of 14 players and a maximum of 25 players, at least two of whom had to be goalkeepers (Regulations Article 23).

== Group stage ==
=== Tiebreakers ===
Teams were ranked according to points (3 points for a win, 1 point for a draw, 0 points for a loss), and if tied on points, the following tiebreaking criteria were applied, in the order given, to determine the rankings (Regulations Article 7.3):

1. Points in head-to-head matches among tied teams;
2. Goal difference in head-to-head matches among tied teams;
3. Goals scored in head-to-head matches among tied teams;
4. If more than two teams were tied, and after applying all head-to-head criteria above, a subset of teams were still tied, all head-to-head criteria above were reapplied exclusively to this subset of teams;
5. Goal difference in all group matches;
6. Goals scored in all group matches;
7. Penalty shoot-out if only two teams were tied and they met in the last round of the group;
8. Disciplinary points (yellow card = 1 point, red card as a result of two yellow cards = 3 points, direct red card = 3 points, yellow card followed by direct red card = 4 points);
9. Drawing of lots.

=== Group A ===
Pos	Team	Pld	W	D	L	GF	GA	GD	Pts	Qualification
1	Indonesia (H)	3	2	1	0	11	4	+7	7	Advance to the knockout stage
2	Iraq	3	2	1	0	8	5	+3	7	Advance to the knockout stage
3	Kyrgyzstan	3	1	0	2	8	11	−3	3	
4	South Korea	3	0	0	3	4	11	−7	0	

Source: AFC
Rules for classification: Group stage tiebreakers
(H) Hosts
27 January 2026
15:00

Iraq	4–2	Kyrgyzstan
Faisal 12'30", 28'56"; Zeyad 16'50"; Abdul-Hadi 39'11"	Report	Amanbaev 0'53"; Kubanychov 25'51"

Indonesia Arena, Jakarta
Referee: Lee Po-fu (Chinese Taipei),
Helday Idang (Malaysia)
27 January 2026
19:00

Indonesia	5–0	South Korea
Iqbal 1'16", 20'54"; Rio 10'29"; Israr 28'52"; Reza 36'03"	Report

Indonesia Arena, Jakarta
Attendance: 6,360
Referee: Andrew Best (Australia),
Oya Tsubasa (Japan)

29 January 2026
15:00

South Korea	2–3	Iraq
Kim Gun-woo 20'16"; Eom Ji-yong 28'48"	Report	Majed 19'05" (pen.); Faisal 37'02"; Kadhim 39'25"

Indonesia Arena, Jakarta
Referee: Majid Al-Hatmi (Oman),
Fahad Al-Hosani (United Arab Emirates)
29 January 2026
19:00

Kyrgyzstan	3–5	Indonesia
Makhmadaminov 5'55", 26'00"; Alimov 26'23" (pen.)	Report	Iqbal 6'51"; Firman 11'57" (pen.); Rio 24'35"; Ardiansyah Nur 28'38"; Israr 33'50"

Indonesia Arena, Jakarta
Attendance: 6,501
Referee: Sukhrob Sattorov (Tajikistan),
Anatoliy Rubakov (Uzbekistan)

31 January 2026
19:00

Indonesia	1–1	Iraq
Samuel 5'41"	Report	Majed 29'27"

Indonesia Arena, Jakarta
Attendance: 10,076
Referee: Yahya Al-Athwani (Saudi Arabia),
Ebrahim Mehrabiafshar (Iran)
31 January 2026
19:00

Kyrgyzstan	3–2	South Korea
Makhmadaminov 15'10"; Talaibekov 28'45", 31'02"	Report	Eom Ji-yong 24'55"; Eom Si-jun 32'14"

Jakarta International Velodrome, Jakarta
Referee: Leung Chung Yin (Hong Kong),
Liu Jianqiao (China)

=== Group B ===
Pos	Team	Pld	W	D	L	GF	GA	GD	Pts	Qualification
1	Thailand	3	3	0	0	9	1	+8	9	Advance to the knockout stage
2	Vietnam	3	2	0	1	7	5	+2	6	Advance to the knockout stage
3	Kuwait	3	1	0	2	12	13	−1	3	
4	Lebanon	3	0	0	3	2	11	−9	0	

Source: AFC
Rules for classification: Group stage tiebreakers
27 January 2026
13:00

Thailand	2–0	Lebanon
Worasak 26'11"; Osamanmusa 33'13"	Report

Jakarta International Velodrome, Jakarta
Referee: Anatoliy Rubakov (Uzbekistan),
Sattorov Sukhrob (Tajikistan)
27 January 2026
17:00

Vietnam	5–4	Kuwait
Châu Đoàn Phát 8'44"; Nguyễn Thịnh Phát 14'53"; Nguyễn Mạnh Dũng 19'59", 31'58"; Từ Minh Quang 29'23"	Report	Al-Enezi 6'15"; Borashed 8'02"; O. Al-Shatti 18'01"; Al-Sarraj 37'44"

Jakarta International Velodrome, Jakarta
Referee: Liu Jianqiao (China),
Leung Chung Yin (Hong Kong)

29 January 2026
13:00

Lebanon	0–2	Vietnam
	Report	Đinh Công Viên 0'19"; Vũ Ngọc Ánh 3'34"

Jakarta International Velodrome, Jakarta
Referee: Helday Idang (Malaysia),
Lee Po-Fu (Chinese Taipei)
29 January 2026
17:00

Kuwait	1–6	Thailand
Narongsak 29'52" (o.g.)	Report	Osamanmusa 15'37", 17'13", 21'48", 30'05"; Sarawut 24'25"; Itticha 35'09"

Jakarta International Velodrome, Jakarta
Referee: Oya Tsubasa (Japan),
Andrew Best (Australia)

31 January 2026
15:00

Thailand	1–0	Vietnam
Krit 35'05"	Report

Indonesia Arena, Jakarta
Referee: Fahad Al-Hosani (United Arab Emirates),
Majid Al-Hatmi (Oman)
31 January 2026
15:00

Kuwait	7–2	Lebanon
Borashed 7'53"; Al-Sarraj 8'57"; Al-Abasi 15'01", 21'18"; Al-Ajmi 18'08"; Al-Enezi 28'52"; Al-Fadhel 39'00"	Report	Cheaito 31'50"; Souss 36'03"

Jakarta International Velodrome, Jakarta
Referee: Sukhrob Sattorov (Tajikistan),
Anatoliy Rubakov (Uzbekistan)

=== Group C ===
Pos	Team	Pld	W	D	L	GF	GA	GD	Pts	Qualification
1	Japan	3	3	0	0	11	3	+8	9	Advance to the knockout stage
2	Uzbekistan	3	1	1	1	5	4	+1	4	Advance to the knockout stage
3	Tajikistan	3	0	2	1	1	4	−3	2	
4	Australia	3	0	1	2	5	11	−6	1	

Source: AFC
Rules for classification: Group stage tiebreakers
28 January 2026
15:00

Japan	6–2	Australia
Motoishi 4'25"; Yamanaka 5'17"; Uchida 9'21"; Harada 17'03"; Yamada 29'28"; Shimizu 36'36" (2pen.)	Report	De Melo 0'29"; Harb 31'55"

Indonesia Arena, Jakarta
Referee: Abdulrahman Al-Doseri (Bahrain),
Timur Ramazanov (Turkmenistan)
28 January 2026
19:00

Uzbekistan	0–0	Tajikistan
	Report

Indonesia Arena, Jakarta
Referee: Ebrahim Mehrabiafshar (Iran),
Yahya Al-Athwani (Saudi Arabia)

30 January 2026
15:00

Australia	2–4	Uzbekistan
Harb 7'35"; Akhadjonov 7'47" (o.g.)	Report	Rakhmatov 8'29"; Ropiev 10'15"; Khamroev 18'29"; Akhadjonov 37'00"

Indonesia Arena, Jakarta
Referee: Elias Al-Hakim (Lebanon),
Abdulaziz Al-Sarraf (Kuwait)
30 January 2026
19:00

Tajikistan	0–3	Japan
	Report	Uchimura 17'06"; Yamada 34'30"; Yamanaka 39'48"

Indonesia Arena, Jakarta
Referee: Wahyu Wicaksono (Indonesia),
Hawkar Ahmed (Iraq)

1 February 2026
15:00

Japan	2–1	Uzbekistan
Yamanaka 29'14", 36'30"	Report	Fakhriddinov 6'30"

Indonesia Arena, Jakarta
Referee: Trương Quốc Dũng (Vietnam),
Pornnarong Grairod (Thailand)
1 February 2026
15:00

Tajikistan	1–1	Australia
Yorov 38'10"	Report	Guerreiro 38'57"

Jakarta International Velodrome, Jakarta
Referee: Wahyu Wicaksono (Indonesia),
Abdulrahman Al-Doseri (Bahrain)

=== Group D ===
Pos	Team	Pld	W	D	L	GF	GA	GD	Pts	Qualification
1	Iran	3	3	0	0	11	3	+8	9	Advance to the knockout stage
2	Afghanistan	3	2	0	1	12	5	+7	6	Advance to the knockout stage
3	Saudi Arabia	3	1	0	2	6	6	0	3	
4	Malaysia	3	0	0	3	2	17	−15	0	

Source: AFC
Rules for classification: Group stage tiebreakers
28 January 2026
13:00

Afghanistan	3–0	Saudi Arabia
Hosseinpour 19'43", 27'48"; Qanbari 38'43"	Report

Jakarta International Velodrome, Jakarta
Referee: Abdulaziz Al-Sarraf (Kuwait),
Elias Al-Hakim (Lebanon)
28 January 2026
17:00

Iran	4–1	Malaysia
Derakhshani 0'43"; Azimi 24'04"; Tayebi 26'14"; Oladghobad 27'59"	Report	Awalluddin 39'06"

Jakarta International Velodrome, Jakarta
Referee: Hawkar Ahmed (Iraq),
Wahyu Wicaksono (Indonesia)

30 January 2026
13:00

Saudi Arabia	0–2	Iran
	Report	Gholami 28'58"; Mohammadi 34'11"

Jakarta International Velodrome, Jakarta
Referee: Pornnarong Grairod (Thailand),
Trương Quốc Dũng (Vietnam)
30 January 2026
17:00

Malaysia	0–7	Afghanistan
	Report	Mousavi 7'32"; Mahmoodi 11'39"; Husseini 12'47"; Moradi 14'40"; Hosseinpour 27'15"; Safari 32'57"; Qanbari 38'54"

Jakarta International Velodrome, Jakarta
Referee: Timur Ramazanov (Turkmenistan),
Abdulrahman Al-Doseri (Bahrain)

1 February 2026
19:00

Iran	5–2	Afghanistan
Azimi 12'11"; Tayebi 28'01", 29'46" (pen.); Shavardazi 35'46"; Karimi 39'03"	Report	Hosseinpoor 31'46"; Safari 32'41"

Jakarta International Velodrome, Jakarta
Referee: Fahad Al-Hosani (United Arab Emirates),
Liu Jianqiao (China)
1 February 2026
19:00

Saudi Arabia	6–1	Malaysia
Rudayni 3'37"; Mohamed 8'14", 15'44", 22'52"; Al-Johani 11'48"; Al-Aqeeli 35'08"	Report	Awalluddin 38'50"

Indonesia Arena, Jakarta
Referee: Lee Po-fu (Chinese Taipei),
Leung Chung Yin (Hong Kong)

== Knockout stage ==
In the knockout stage, extra time and penalty shoot-out are used to decide the winner if necessary (Regulations Article 15.1).

=== Bracket ===
Quarter-finals
3 February – Indonesia Arena
Indonesia	3
Vietnam	2
3 February – Jakarta Velodrome
Japan	6
Afghanistan	0
3 February – Indonesia Arena
Thailand	2
Iraq	4
3 February – Jakarta Velodrome
Iran	7
Uzbekistan	4

Semi-finals
5 February – Indonesia Arena
Indonesia (a.e.t.)	5
Japan	3
5 February – Indonesia Arena
Iraq	2
Iran	4

Final
7 February – Indonesia Arena
Indonesia	5 (4)
Iran (p)	5 (5)

=== Quarter-finals ===
3 February 2026
13:00

Iran	7–4	Uzbekistan
Oladghobad 6'19"; Ahmadabbasi 8'22"; Derakhshani 11'24"; Sabzi 17'01", 39'40"; Tayebi 23'12" (pen.); Azimi 30'52"	Report	Ropiev 0'38" (pen.); Tulkinov 4'55"; Juraev 25'08"; Akhadjonov 31'59"

Jakarta International Velodrome, Jakarta
Referee: Wahyu Wicaksono (Indonesia),
Trương Quốc Dũng (Vietnam)

3 February 2026
15:00

Thailand	2–4	Iraq
Osamanmusa 8'17"; Chaowala 39'46"	Report	Ihsan 7'13", 21'59"; Kadhim 32'40"; Ahmed 36'51"

Indonesia Arena, Jakarta
Referee: Sukhrob Sattorov (Tajikistan),
Abdulrahman Al-Doseri (Bahrain)

3 February 2026
17:00

Japan	6–0	Afghanistan
Shimizu 4'06", 25'16", 37'02"; Uchida 26'06"; Yoshikawa 26'35"; Izu 35'09"	Report

Jakarta International Velodrome, Jakarta
Referee: Ebrahim Mehrabiafshar (Iran), Timur Ramazanov (Turkmenistan)

3 February 2026
19:00

Indonesia	3–2	Vietnam
Brian 3'47"; Ardiansyah Nur 10'23"; Reza 25'40"	Report	Nguyễn Đa Hải 24'51", 35'43"

Indonesia Arena, Jakarta
Attendance: 8,411
Referee: Hawkar Ahmed (Iraq),
Pornnarong Grairod (Thailand)

=== Semi-finals ===
5 February 2026
15:00

Iraq	2–4	Iran
Kadhim 9'25", 13'00"	Report	Derakhshani 10'18"; Azimi 16'11"; Tayebi 25'24"; Aghapour 39'01"

Indonesia Arena, Jakarta
Referee: Liu Jianqiao (China),
Andrew Best (Australia)

5 February 2026
19:00

Indonesia	5–3 (a.e.t.)	Japan
Samuel 11'30"; Motoishi 22'07" (o.g.); Firman 38'22"; Reza 44'16"; Dewa 47'01"	Report	Motoishi 30'21"; Shimizu 34'17", 39'22" (pen.)

Indonesia Arena, Jakarta
Attendance: 10,389
Referee: Fahad Al-Hosani (United Arab Emirates),
Anatoliy Rubakov (Uzbekistan)

=== Final ===
This was the first time ever that Indonesia and Iran met together in final. For Indonesia, this was their first appearance in an AFC final at any level since the U-20 team did in 1970 Youth tournament. This was also the first time Iran conceded 5 goals in the final match.

7 February 2026
19:00

Indonesia	5–5 (a.e.t.)	Iran
Gunawan 6'28"; Israr 7'37", 8'31", 48'05"; Samuel 23'20"	Report	Tayebi 2'53"; Karimi 17'59", 36'53"; Ahmadabbasi 22'57", 48'42"
Penalties
Firman (penalty scored); Rio (penalty scored); Rizki (penalty scored); Dewa (penalty missed); Ardiansyah Nur (penalty scored); Israr (penalty missed)	4–5	(penalty missed) Shavardazi; (penalty scored) Derakhshani; (penalty scored) Ahmadabbasi; (penalty scored) Aghapour; (penalty scored) Tayebi; (penalty scored) Sabzi

Indonesia Arena, Jakarta
Attendance: 10.733
Referee: Liu Jianqiao (China),
Sukhrob Sattorov (Tajikistan)

== Awards ==
The following awards were given at the conclusion of the tournament:

Top scorer	Best player	Best goalkeeper	Fair-play award
(Thailand) Muhammad Osamanmusa	(Iran) Saeid Ahmadabbasi	(Indonesia) Ahmad Habiebie	Iraq

In situations where several players are tied in the number of goals, they use other criteria such as assists or average minutes per goal.

== Goalscorers ==
There were 166 goals scored in 31 matches, for an average of 5.35 goals per match.

6 goals

- (Thailand) Muhammad Osamanmusa
- (Japan) Kazuya Shimizu
- (Iran) Hossein Tayebi

5 goals

- (Indonesia) Israr Megantara

4 goals

- (Afghanistan) Reza Hosseinpour
- (Japan) Shoto Yamanaka
- (Indonesia) Reza Gunawan
- (Iran) Behrooz Azimi
- (Iraq) Salim Kadhim

3 goals

- (Indonesia) Iqbal Iskandar
- (Indonesia) Samuel Eko
- (Iran) Mohammadhossein Derakhshani
- (Iran) Mahdi Karimi
- (Iran) Saeid Ahmadabbasi
- (Iraq) Salim Faisal
- (Saudi Arabia) Eihab Mohamed
- (Kyrgyzstan) Shokhrukh Makhmadaminov

2 goals

- (Afghanistan) Omid Qanbari
- (Afghanistan) Javad Safari
- (Australia) Jyden Harb
- (Indonesia) Ardiansyah Nur
- (Indonesia) Firman Adriansyah
- (Indonesia) Rio Pangestu
- (Iran) Hossein Sabzi
- (Iran) Salar Aghapour
- (Iraq) Mustafa Ihsan
- (Iraq) Haedr Majed
- (Japan) Kaito Yamada
- (Japan) Takehiro Motoishi
- (Japan) Shunta Uchida
- (Kuwait) Abduellteif Al-Abasi
- (Kuwait) Abdullah Al-Enezi
- (Kuwait) Abdulaziz Al-Sarraj
- (Kuwait) Abd Al-Aziz Borashed
- (South Korea) Eom Ji-yong
- (Kyrgyzstan) Daniiar Talaibekov
- (Malaysia) Awalluddin Nawi
- (Uzbekistan) Muzaffar Akhadjonov
- (Uzbekistan) Ikhtiyor Ropiev
- (Vietnam) Nguyễn Đa Hải
- (Vietnam) Nguyễn Mạnh Dũng

1 goal

- (Afghanistan) Sayed Mojtaba Husseini
- (Afghanistan) Farzad Mahmoodi
- (Afghanistan) Mohammad Moradi
- (Afghanistan) Seyed Hossein Mousavi
- (Australia) Ethan De Melo
- (Australia) Jordan Guerreiro
- (Indonesia) Brian Ick
- (Indonesia) Dewa Rizki
- (Iran) Masoud Shavardazi
- (Iran) Amirhossein Gholami
- (Iran) Bagher Mohammadi
- (Iran) Moslem Oladghobad
- (Iraq) Mohanad Abdulhadi
- (Iraq) Tareq Zeyad
- (Iraq) Ibrahim Ahmed
- (Japan) Kokoro Harada
- (Japan) Tomoki Yoshikawa
- (Japan) Ryuji Izu
- (Japan) Shunta Uchimura
- (Kuwait) Mohammad Al-Ajmi
- (Kuwait) Omar Al-Shatti
- (Kuwait) Saleh Al-Fadhel
- (Saudi Arabia) Abdullah Al-Aqeeli
- (Saudi Arabia) Fahad Al-Johani
- (Saudi Arabia) Fahad Rudayni
- (Kyrgyzstan) Maksat Alimov
- (Kyrgyzstan) Donierbek Amanbaev
- (Kyrgyzstan) Kairat Kubanychov
- (Lebanon) Hadi Cheaito
- (Lebanon) Abed Al Rahman Souss
- (South Korea) Eom Si-jun
- (South Korea) Kim Gun-woo
- (Thailand) Itticha Praphaphan
- (Thailand) Krit Aransanyalak
- (Thailand) Sarawut Phalaphruek
- (Thailand) Worasak Srirangpirot
- (Thailand) Chaowala Sriarwut
- (Tajikistan) Idris Yorov
- (Uzbekistan) Elbek Tulkinov
- (Uzbekistan) Ilkhomjon Khamroev
- (Uzbekistan) Anaskhon Rakhmatov
- (Uzbekistan) Sunatulla Juraev
- (Uzbekistan) Shakhram Fakhriddinov
- (Vietnam) Châu Đoàn Phát
- (Vietnam) Đinh Công Viên
- (Vietnam) Nguyễn Thịnh Phát
- (Vietnam) Từ Minh Quang
- (Vietnam) Vũ Ngọc Ánh

1 own goal

- (Thailand) Narongsak Wingwon (against Kuwait)
- (Uzbekistan) Muzaffar Akhadjonov (against Australia)
- (Japan) Takehiro Motoishi (against Indonesia)
