= Futsal in Iran =

Futsal in Iran is conducted under the auspices of the Futsal Commission of the Islamic Republic of Iran Football Federation. Futsal is a popular and growing sport in the country.

Iran has a strong national futsal team, which has won all the editions of Asian Futsal Championship except one. Iran's nationwide Futsal Super League is considered as the strongest futsal league in Asia and currently Iran's Shensa FSC holds the continent's Futsal Club Championship title.

Iran has some of the best futsal players in the continent and also in the world including Vahid Shamsaee, world's top international futsal scorer with over 330 goals scored so far.

Futsal teams in Iran partly enjoy their success due to the style of football played outside, Gol Koochik, which means small goal. The goal is approximately 100x60 cm in size and the ball is light-weight. This is the kind of soccer many Iranians play. Great dribbling skills are needed and players need to learn to maneuver the ball quickly.

== Results ==
As of 1 April 2025

=== Asian ===
Events	M	W	D	L	GF	GA	GD
AFC Men's Futsal Asian Cup	105	98	3	4	963	150	+863
AFC Women's Futsal Asian Cup	10	10	0	0	58	9	+49
AFC Men's U-20 Futsal Asian Cup	12	11	0	1	68	25	+43
AFC Women's U-20 Futsal Asian Cup	0	0	0	0	0	0	0
AFC Men's Futsal Club Championship	50	40	3	7	242	105	+137
AFC Women's Futsal Club Championship	0	0	0	0	0	0	0
Asian Indoor Games (Men)	28	27	1	0	279	42	+237
Asian Indoor Games (Women)	19	12	0	7	109	39	+70
Total	224	198	7	19	1719	370	+1349

=== Central Asian ===
Events	M	W	D	L	GF	GA	GD
CAFA Men's Futsal Championship	5	4	0	1	13	3	+10
CAFA Women's Futsal Championship	17	16	1	0	137	11	+126
CAFA Men's U19 Futsal Championship	4	4	0	0	25	6	+19
CAFA Women's U19 Futsal Championship	5	5	0	0	52	2	+50
Total	31	29	1	1	227	22	+205

== Medals ==
As of 1 April 2025

=== Asian ===
1. Men (1999-2024) - 17 Editions
2. Women (2015-2018) - 2 Editions
3. Men Youth (2017-2019) - 2 Editions
4. Women Youth () - 0 Editions
5. Men Club (2010-2019) - 10 Editions
6. Women Club () - 0 Editions
7. Men Indoor Games (2005-2017) - 5 Editions
8. Women Indoor Games (2005-2017) - 5 Editions

Rank	Nation	Gold	Silver	Bronze	Total
1	Iran (IRI)	25	7	5	37
2	Japan (JPN)	12	10	6	28
3	Thailand (THA)	3	9	12	24
4	Uzbekistan (UZB)	1	6	10	17
5	Iraq (IRQ)	0	2	0	2
6	Vietnam (VIE)	0	1	3	4
7	Jordan (JOR)	0	1	1	2
7	Kazakhstan (KAZ)	0	1	1	2
7	South Korea (KOR)	0	1	1	2
10	Afghanistan (AFG)	0	1	0	1
10	Kuwait (KUW)	0	1	0	1
10	Qatar (QAT)	0	1	0	1
13	Lebanon (LBN)	0	0	2	2
Totals (13 entries)		41	41	41	123

=== Central Asian ===
1. Men (2023) - 1 Editions
2. Women (2022-2025) - 4 Editions
3. Men Youth (2022) - 1 Editions
4. Women Youth (2020) - 1 Editions
5. Men Club () - 0 Editions
6. Women Club () - 0 Editions

Rank	Nation	Gold	Silver	Bronze	Total
1	Iran (IRI)	7	0	0	7
2	Uzbekistan (UZB)	0	5	1	6
3	Afghanistan (AFG)	0	2	0	2
4	Kyrgyzstan (KGZ)	0	0	4	4
5	Tajikistan (TJK)	0	0	1	1
5	Turkmenistan (TKM)	0	0	1	1
Totals (6 entries)		7	7	7	21

== Men's Futsal ==
=== National team ===
Iran national futsal team's first international match was on 2 May 1992 in a 19–6 victory against Kuwait national futsal team. The Iran men's national team is regarded as one of the strongest teams in the world of futsal and almost dominates Asia base on currently ranked fifth in the FIFA rankings. Iran has appeared in the FIFA Futsal World Cup six times, with their best result being a semi–final appearance in 1992. Iran have also won the AFC Futsal Championship a record ten times and have reached the final of the Grand Prix de Futsal three times. Vahid Shamsaei is Iran and international futsal's record international goalscorer with 390 goals in 189 matches.

Iran defeated world champions Brazil in the 2016 FIFA Futsal World Cup in the Round of 16 and reached the semi-finals of the tournament after defeating Paraguay in extra time.

=== Club Competition ===
The highest club futsal league in Iran is currently the Iranian Futsal Super League which was founded in 2003 with the current format followed by the 1st Division and the 2nd Division. The most successful club in the history of the Super League is Shahid Mansouri Gharchak who have won the league twice and finished runners up three times.

The Iranian Super League is the most successful league in the AFC Futsal Club Championship having won three of the seven editions and finishing runners up three other times.

== Women's Futsal ==
Iran has had a women's futsal team since 2001. The women's futsal team participated for the first time at the 2007 Asian Indoor Games finishing in fifth place. In 2013 Iran achieved their best ever result at the Asian Indoor Games, finishing as runner–up after a 2–1 loss to Japan in the final. Iran won AFC Women's Futsal Championship two times by defeating Japan in finals. 1–0 in 2015 and 5-2 in 2018.

== See also ==
- Sport in Iran
- Football in Iran
- Iran national futsal team
- Iran women's national futsal team
- Iran national under-20 futsal team
