= 2022 AFC Futsal Asian Cup qualification =

International futsal competition

Tournament details
- Host countries: Thailand (ASEAN); Kyrgyz Republic (Central & South); Malaysia (East); United Arab Emirates (West)
- Dates: 1 April – 21 May 2022
- Teams: 31 (from 1 confederation)

Tournament statistics
- Matches played: 52
- Goals scored: 377 (7.25 per match)
- Attendance: 3,255 (63 per match)
- Top scorer: (Thailand) Muhammad Osamanmusa (11 goals)

The 2022 AFC Futsal Asian Cup qualification was the qualification process organized by the Asian Football Confederation (AFC) to determine the participating teams for the 2022 AFC Futsal Asian Cup, the 17th edition of the international men's futsal championship of Asia.

A total of 15 teams qualified to play in the final tournament, excluding Kuwait - who automatically qualified as a host.

The qualification process was divided into four zones: ASEAN Zone, where the 2022 AFF Futsal Championship served as the qualifying competition, Central & South Zone, East Zone, and West Zone.

== Qualification process ==
Of the 47 AFC member associations, a total of 31 teams entered the competition. Sixteen spots in the final tournament were distributed as follows:

- Host: 1 spot (Kuwait)
- West Zone: 5 spots
- Central & South Zone: 4 spots
- East Zone: 3 spots
- ASEAN Zone: 3 spots

=== Draw ===
- In the West Zone, seven teams were drawn into one group of four teams and another group of three teams.

West Zone
Pot 1	Pot 2	Pot 3	Pot 4
**Iraq**; **Lebanon**	**Bahrain**; **Saudi Arabia**	United Arab Emirates	**Oman**; Palestine

- In the Central & South Zone, eight teams were drawn into two groups.

Central and South Zone
Pot 1	Pot 2	Pot 3	Pot 4
**Iran**; **Uzbekistan**	Kyrgyzstan; **Tajikistan**	**Turkmenistan**; Afghanistan	Nepal; Maldives

- In the East Zone, six teams were drawn into two group of three teams. Later, after China withdrew, the qualification was played as one group instead.

East Zone
Pot 1	Pot 2	Pot 3
**Japan**; **Chinese Taipei**	~~China~~; **South Korea**	Hong Kong; Mongolia

- Three berths from the ASEAN Zone were determined by 2022 AFF Futsal Championship where a separate draw was conducted by the ASEAN Football Federation on February 21.

ASEAN Zone
Pot 1	Pot 2	Pot 3	Pot 4	Pot 5
**Thailand**; **Vietnam**	Malaysia; Myanmar	**Indonesia**; Timor-Leste	Australia; Cambodia	Brunei

Notes

- Teams in **bold** qualified for the final tournament.

Did not enter
West Zone	Central and South Zone (all of them in South Zone)	East Zone	ASEAN Zone
Jordan; Qatar; Syria; Yemen	Bangladesh; Bhutan; India; Pakistan; Sri Lanka	Guam; Macau; Northern Mariana Islands; North Korea; China	Laos; Philippines; Singapore

== Format ==
The qualifiers took place between April 1 to 15 in centralized venues. In the West Zone, the United Arab Emirates were the hosts. Top two teams from each group and the winner of the play-off match between the third placed teams qualified. In the Central and South Zone, the matches were played in the Kyrgyz Republic where top two teams from each group advanced to the final tournament. The host for the East Zone were Malaysia. The top three teams from the five team group qualified for the tournament. The 2022 AFF Futsal Championship acts as the qualifiers for the ASEAN Zone, in which the top three teams (e.g. the two finalists and the winners of the third-place playoff) qualified.

== West Zone ==
Top two teams of each group, and the winner of the play-off between the group third-placed team, qualified for 2022 AFC Futsal Asian Cup.

- The matches were played between 5 and 9 April 2022.
- All matches were played in United Arab Emirates.
- Times listed are UTC+4.

=== Group A ===
Pos	Team	Pld	W	D	L	GF	GA	GD	Pts	Qualification
1	Lebanon	3	2	1	0	11	7	+4	7	2022 AFC Futsal Asian Cup
2	Saudi Arabia	3	1	2	0	10	9	+1	5	2022 AFC Futsal Asian Cup
3	Oman	3	0	2	1	4	5	−1	2	Play-off
4	Palestine	3	0	1	2	8	12	−4	1	

Source: AFC
Rules for classification: Qualification tiebreakers
5 April 2022
19:30

Lebanon	2–1	Oman
Taqi 16' (o.g.); Rhyem 25'	Report	Al-Shamsi 30'

Zayed Sports Complex, Fujairah
Referee: Ebrahim Mehrabi Afshar (Iran)
5 April 2022
21:30

Saudi Arabia	5–4	Palestine
Rudayni 4', 34'; Al-Zahrani 17', 28'; Al-Otaibi 20' (pen.)	Report	Shawahna 22'; Salloum 25', 38'; Mohammed 26'

Zayed Sports Complex, Fujairah
Referee: Helday Idang (Malaysia)

6 April 2022
19:30

Oman	2–2	Saudi Arabia
Taqi 1'; Al-Maawali 25'	Report	Rudayni 2'; Al-Harthi 14'

Zayed Sports Complex, Fujairah
Referee: Hiroyuki Kobayashi (Japan)
6 April 2022
21:30

Palestine	3–6	Lebanon
Shawahna 14'; Salloum 27'; Fahjan 37'	Report	Kawsan 6'; Rhyem 11', 34'; Zeitoun 24', 29'; Kobeissy 33'

Zayed Sports Complex, Fujairah
Referee: Zari Fathi (Iran)

7 April 2022
19:30

Lebanon	3–3	Saudi Arabia
Rhyem 19', 40'; Al-Harthi 40' (o.g.)	Report	Al-Maleh 5'; Al-Mulla 18'; Mubarak 21'

Zayed Sports Complex, Fujairah
Referee: Jargalsaikhan Rentsenkhand (Mongolia)
7 April 2022
21:30

Palestine	1–1	Oman
Salloum 20'	Report	Al-Shamsi 30'

Zayed Sports Complex, Fujairah
Referee: Lee Po-fu (Chinese Taipei)

=== Group B ===
Pos	Team	Pld	W	D	L	GF	GA	GD	Pts	Qualification
1	Iraq	2	1	1	0	3	1	+2	4	2022 AFC Futsal Asian Cup
2	Bahrain	2	1	1	0	2	1	+1	4	2022 AFC Futsal Asian Cup
3	United Arab Emirates (H)	2	0	0	2	0	3	−3	0	Play-off

Source: AFC
Rules for classification: Qualification tiebreakers
(H) Hosts
5 April 2022
23:30

United Arab Emirates	0–2	Iraq
	Report	Hameed 5'; Faisal 28'

Zayed Sports Complex, Fujairah
Referee: Anatoliy Rubakov (Uzbekistan)

6 April 2022
23:30

Bahrain	1–0	United Arab Emirates
Maula 37'	Report

Zayed Sports Complex, Fujairah
Referee: Benjapol Mucharoensap (Thailand)

7 April 2022
23:30

Iraq	1–1	Bahrain
Haqi 29'	Report	Abdulnabi 8'

Zayed Sports Complex, Fujairah
Referee: Ebrahim Mehrabi Afshar (Iran)

=== Play-off ===
The winner qualified for 2022 AFC Futsal Asian Cup.

9 April 2022
20:00

Oman	5–3	United Arab Emirates
Al-Shamsi 4', 24'; S. Al-Balushi 30'; Z. Al-Balushi 34', 39'	Report	Al-Falasi 18'; Obaid 26'; Al-Hammadi 27'

Zayed Sports Complex, Fujairah
Referee: Anatoliy Rubakov (Uzbekistan)

== Central and South Zone ==
Top two teams of each group qualified for 2022 AFC Futsal Asian Cup.

- The matches were played between 10 and 12 April 2022.
- All matches were played in Kyrgyzstan.
- Times are listed are UTC+6.

=== Group A ===
Pos	Team	Pld	W	D	L	GF	GA	GD	Pts	Qualification
1	Iran	3	3	0	0	28	1	+27	9	2022 AFC Futsal Asian Cup
2	Turkmenistan	3	2	0	1	10	4	+6	6	2022 AFC Futsal Asian Cup
3	Kyrgyzstan (H)	3	1	0	2	9	12	−3	3	
4	Maldives	3	0	0	3	1	31	−30	0	

Source: AFC
Rules for classification: Qualification tiebreakers
(H) Hosts
10 April 2022
17:00

Iran	17–0	Maldives
Aghapour 5', 15'; Derakhshani 6'; Tayyebi 11', 25', 26'; Karimi 20'; Ahmadabbasi 20', 20', 23', 33', 33'; Kadkhoda 34', 35'; Shavardazi 37', 37'; Rafieipour 38'	Report

Gazprom Sports Complex, Bishkek
Referee: Kim Jong-hee (South Korea)
10 April 2022
20:00

Kyrgyzstan	1–3	Turkmenistan
Makhmadaminov 31'	Report	Gurbanow 27'; Garajayew 28'; Baýramow 40'

Gazprom Sports Complex, Bishkek
Referee: Mohamad Chami (Lebanon)

11 April 2022
17:00

Turkmenistan	0–3	Iran
	Report	Tayyebi 12'; Ahmadabbasi 20'; Baýramdurdyýew 38' (o.g.)

Gazprom Sports Complex, Bishkek
Referee: Pornnarong Grairod (Thailand)
11 April 2022
20:00

Maldives	1–7	Kyrgyzstan
Shareef 31'	Report	Isabekov 7'; Dolotkeldiev 13', 40'; Zholdubaev 20'; Abdyzhalil Uulu 28'; Daniiar Uulu 30'; Naseer 31' (o.g.)

Gazprom Sports Complex, Bishkek
Referee: Jo Young-ha (South Korea)

12 April 2022
17:00

Turkmenistan	7–0	Maldives
Gurbanow 2'; Annagulyýew 20'; Berenow 24'; Sähedow 27', 40'; Garajayew 32', 37'	Report

Gazprom Sports Complex, Bishkek
Referee: Panadda Khotsenaphattra (Thailand)
12 April 2022
20:00

Iran	8–1	Kyrgyzstan
Tayyebi 14'; Ezzati 14'; Rafieipour 30', 31'; Derakhshani 34'; Kadkhoda 36'; Abbasi 37'; Shavardazi 40'	Report	Alimov 13'

Gazprom Sports Complex, Bishkek
Referee: Benjapol Mucharoensap (Thailand)

=== Group B ===
Pos	Team	Pld	W	D	L	GF	GA	GD	Pts	Qualification
1	Uzbekistan	3	3	0	0	15	4	+11	9	2022 AFC Futsal Asian Cup
2	Tajikistan	3	1	1	1	17	10	+7	4	2022 AFC Futsal Asian Cup
3	Afghanistan	3	1	1	1	13	10	+3	4	
4	Nepal	3	0	0	3	3	24	−21	0	

Source: AFC
Rules for classification: Qualification tiebreakers
10 April 2022
11:00

Uzbekistan	5–1	Nepal
Nishonov 2'; Usmonov 11'; Ropiev 16', 32'; Elmurodov 40'	Report	Lama 28'

Gazprom Sports Complex, Bishkek
Referee: Yuttakon Maiket (Thailand)
10 April 2022
14:00

Tajikistan	4–4	Afghanistan
Sharipov 1'; Sardorov 24'; Yorov 38', 40'	Report	Mahmoodi 25'; Sadeqi 26'; Yorov 28' (o.g.); Hossaini 34'

Gazprom Sports Complex, Bishkek
Referee: Trương Quốc Dũng (Vietnam)

11 April 2022
11:00

Nepal	1–11	Tajikistan
Hamid 3'	Report	Yorov 8', 38'; Kuziev 21', 34'; Sardorov 25', 31', 32'; Halimov 33', 34'; Rizomov 37', 38'

Gazprom Sports Complex, Bishkek
Referee: Tsubasa Oya (Japan)
11 April 2022
14:00

Afghanistan	1–5	Uzbekistan
Amiri 2'	Report	Nishonov 3'; Ropiev 7', 8'; Choriev 11'; Rakhmatov 32'

Gazprom Sports Complex, Bishkek
Referee: Eisa Abdulhoussain (Kuwait)

12 April 2022
11:00

Uzbekistan	5–2	Tajikistan
Nishonov 7'; Choriev 20', 40'; Rakhmatov 23'; Usmonov 33'	Report	Salomov 12'; Sardorov 33'

Gazprom Sports Complex, Bishkek
Referee: Khalil Balhawan (Lebanon)
12 April 2022
14:00

Afghanistan	8–1	Nepal
Karimi 1', 32' (pen.); Mohammadi 15'; Amiri 24'; Sadeqi 25', 36', 40'; Hashemi 33'	Report	Shrestha 39'

Gazprom Sports Complex, Bishkek
Referee: Kumi Hiruma (Japan)

== East Zone ==
The top three teams qualified for 2022 AFC Futsal Asian Cup. China withdrew from the tournament on 20 April 2022 due to the surge in COVID-19 cases in the country following the 2022 Shanghai COVID-19 outbreak. Before they withdrew, the qualification was to be staged between six teams which were drawn into two groups of three teams, with the group winners and a play-off winner between the group runner-ups to qualify for the final tournament.

- The matches were played between 17 and 21 May 2022.
- All matches were played in Malaysia.
- Times listed are UTC+8.

Pos	Team	Pld	W	D	L	GF	GA	GD	Pts	Qualification
1	Japan	4	4	0	0	42	3	+39	12	2022 AFC Futsal Asian Cup
2	South Korea	4	2	1	1	11	12	−1	7	2022 AFC Futsal Asian Cup
3	Chinese Taipei	4	2	0	2	13	14	−1	6	2022 AFC Futsal Asian Cup
4	Hong Kong	4	0	2	2	6	17	−11	2	
5	Mongolia	4	0	1	3	2	28	−26	1	

Source: AFC
Rules for classification: Qualification tiebreakers
17 May 2022
17:00

South Korea	4−2	Chinese Taipei
Shin Jong-hoon 8'; Kim Min-kuk 15'; Hwang Un 18'; Seo Jung-woo 40'	Report	Lin Chih-hung 2'; He Chia-chen 25'

Panasonic Sports Complex, Shah Alam
Referee: Trương Quốc Dũng (Vietnam)
17 May 2022
20:30

Mongolia	1−1	Hong Kong
Temüülen 7'	Report	Chow Ka Lok 34'

Panasonic Sports Complex, Shah Alam
Referee: Hasan Al-Gburi (Iraq)

18 May 2022
17:00

Hong Kong	2−11	Japan
Lee Ho Wo 1'; Chow Ka Lok 37'	Report	Crepaldi 2', 28', 30'; Kanazawa 3'; Uchida 6'; Uemura 12', 24'; Yoshikawa 20'; Oliveira 28'; Tsutsumi 31'; Mori 40'

Panasonic Sports Complex, Shah Alam
Referee: Ali Hafizi (Iran)
18 May 2022
20:30

Mongolia	0−6	South Korea
	Report	Hwang Un 2'; Kang Ju-kwang 4'; Shin Jong-hoon 7'; Eom Tae-yeon 23'; Ahn Kwang-su 32'; Lee Ahn 36'

Panasonic Sports Complex, Shah Alam
Referee: Gelareh Nazemi Deylami (Iran)

19 May 2022
17:00

Japan	15−0	Mongolia
Yoshikawa 4'; Kato 6'; Motoishi 8', 33', 35'; Kanazawa 11'; Oliveira 12'; Mori 14', 26'; Harada 24', 40'; Battogtokh 24' (o.g.); Crepaldi 30'; Uemura 35'; Tumurbaatar 35' (o.g.)	Report

Panasonic Sports Complex, Shah Alam
Referee: Behruz Murtazoev (Tajikistan)
19 May 2022
20:30

Chinese Taipei	4−2	Hong Kong
Liu Ju-ming 5', 26'; Lin Chih-hung 11'; Huang Wei-lun 19'	Report	Chow Ka Wa 5', 18'

Panasonic Sports Complex, Shah Alam
Referee: Wahyu Wicaksono (Indonesia)

20 May 2022
17:00

Chinese Taipei	6−1	Mongolia
Chen Ching-hsuan 16'; Lin Chih-hung 18'; Liu Ju-ming 18'; Chi Sheng-fa 20', 27'; Chu Chia-wei 36'	Report	Tumurbaatar 11'

Panasonic Sports Complex, Shah Alam
Referee: Gelareh Nazemi Deylami (Iran)
20 May 2022
20:30

South Korea	0−9	Japan
	Report	Lee Jin-hyuk 5' (o.g.); Uemura 7'; Oliveira 8'; Kanazawa 12', 21'; Kuromoto 19'; Hirata 32'; Uchida 39'; Kato 40'

Panasonic Sports Complex, Shah Alam
Referee: Pornnarong Grairod (Thailand)

21 May 2022
17:00

Hong Kong	1−1	South Korea
Lee Jin-hyuk 36' (o.g.)	Report	Kim Yun-young 31'

Panasonic Sports Complex, Shah Alam
Referee: Trương Quốc Dũng (Vietnam)
21 May 2022
20:30

Japan	7−1	Chinese Taipei
Uchida 6', 16', 22'; Crepaldi 24'; Oliveira 29' (pen.); Hirata 33'; Takami 37'	Report	Chi Sheng-fa 2'

Panasonic Sports Complex, Shah Alam
Referee: Hawkar Salar Ahmed (Iraq)

== ASEAN Zone ==
Top three teams of the 2022 AFF Futsal Championship qualified for 2022 AFC Futsal Asian Cup.

- The matches were played between 2 and 10 April 2022.
- All matches were held in Thailand.
- Times listed are UTC+7.

=== Group A ===
Pos	Team	Pld	W	D	L	GF	GA	GD	Pts	Qualification
1	Thailand (H)	4	3	1	0	35	4	+31	10	Semi-finals
2	Indonesia	4	3	1	0	30	5	+25	10	Semi-finals
3	Malaysia	4	2	0	2	20	15	+5	6	
4	Cambodia	4	0	1	3	10	36	−26	1	
5	Brunei	4	0	1	3	2	37	−35	1	

Source: AFF
Rules for classification: Qualification tiebreakers
(H) Hosts
2 April 2022
15:00

Malaysia	7–6	Cambodia
Saiful 1', 20'; Khairul 9', 39'; Abu 23', 32'; Sichamroeun 29' (o.g.)	Report	Sereyvong 6', 25'; Sichamroeun 17'; Prum 18'; Tong 33'; Lun 39'

Indoor Stadium Huamark, Bangkok
Attendance: 50
Referee: Leung Chung Yin (Hong Kong)
2 April 2022
17:00

Thailand	13–0	Brunei
Krit 1'; Panat 5'; Kritsada 9', 23', 40'; Apiwat 13'; Abdul 13' (o.g.); Peerapat 17', 34'; Ronnachai 22'; Aiman 25' (o.g.); Osamanmusa 37', 38'	Report

Indoor Stadium Huamark, Bangkok
Attendance: 100
Referee: Osama Idrees Sedaif (Bahrain)

3 April 2022
15:00

Brunei	0–12	Indonesia
	Report	Soumilena 2', 3'; Pangestu 5'; Sunny 7'; Syauqi 13', 20'; Ardiansyah 19', 33'; Ardiansyah N. 21'; Rizki 27', 34'; Khalil 40' (o.g.)

Indoor Stadium Huamark, Bangkok
Attendance: 50
Referee: Gelareh Nazemi Deylami (Iran)
3 April 2022
17:00

Cambodia	0–16	Thailand
	Report	Osamanmusa 5', 5', 12', 26'; Kritsada 7'; Ronnachai 11', 18'; Atsadawut 14'; Peerapat 21', 30'; Apiwat 23'; Phirun 23' (o.g.); Supakorn 24'; Krit 28'; Panat 37', 38'

Indoor Stadium Huamark, Bangkok
Attendance: 200
Referee: Fahad Al-Hosani (United Arab Emirates)

4 April 2022
15:00

Indonesia	5–1	Malaysia
Ardiansyah N. 21', 35'; Firman 29'; Soumilena 39', 39'	Report	Ridzwan 22'

Indoor Stadium Huamark, Bangkok
Attendance: 0
Referee: Fahad Al-Hosani (United Arab Emirates)
4 April 2022
17:00

Brunei	2–2	Cambodia
Zairul 20'; Sophath 34' (o.g.)	Report	Sereyvong 4'; Khalil 9' (o.g.)

Indoor Stadium Huamark, Bangkok
Attendance: 10
Referee: Leung Chung Yin (Hong Kong)

5 April 2022
15:00

Malaysia	10–0	Brunei
Ekmal 8', 34'; Juma 18' (o.g.); Sufri 21', 22'; Abu 33'; Farhan 33'; Lee 37', 37'; Aidil 38'	Report

Indoor Stadium Huamark, Bangkok
Attendance: 50
Referee: Andrew Best (Australia)
5 April 2022
17:00

Indonesia	2–2	Thailand
Soumilena 1'; Ardiansyah N. 6'	Report	Osamanmusa 11', 35'

Indoor Stadium Huamark, Bangkok
Attendance: 200
Referee: Osama Idrees Sedaif (Bahrain)

6 April 2022
15:00

Cambodia	2–11	Indonesia
Sirotha 8'; Tong 19'	Report	Ardiansyah 7', 22', 31', 36'; Iqbal 12'; Syauqi 21', 21', 22'; Wossiry 29'; Prum 30' (o.g.); Soumilena 37'

Indoor Stadium Huamark, Bangkok
Attendance: 50
Referee: Andrew Best (Australia)
6 April 2022
17:00

Thailand	4–2	Malaysia
Tanapol 7'; Sarawut 29', 34'; Kritsada 39'	Report	Farhan 12', 27'

Indoor Stadium Huamark, Bangkok
Attendance: 250
Referee: Gelareh Nazemi Deylami (Iran)

=== Group B ===
Pos	Team	Pld	W	D	L	GF	GA	GD	Pts	Qualification
1	Myanmar	3	2	1	0	17	5	+12	7	Semi-finals
2	Vietnam	3	2	1	0	13	3	+10	7	Semi-finals
3	Australia	3	1	0	2	9	15	−6	3	
4	Timor-Leste	3	0	0	3	8	24	−16	0	

Source: AFF
Rules for classification: Qualification tiebreakers
4 April 2022
11:00

Vietnam	1–1	Myanmar
Nhan Gia Hưng 13'	Report	Myo Myint Soe 27'

Indoor Stadium Huamark, Bangkok
Attendance: 50
Referee: Husain Ali Al-Bahhar (Bahrain)
4 April 2022
13:00

Timor-Leste	4–7	Australia
M. Fernandes 5'; Ximenes 8'; Mesquita 13'; Sweedan 20' (o.g.)	Report	Fornito 4'; Adeli 9', 29'; Rathjen 18'; Rogan 24', 35'; Guerreiro 25'

Indoor Stadium Huamark, Bangkok
Attendance: 50
Referee: Abdulrahman Al-Doseri (Bahrain)

5 April 2022
11:00

Australia	1–6	Myanmar
Haddad 10'	Report	Thyne Phwet Aung 4', 32'; Nyein Min Soe 16', 25'; Hein Min Soe 24'; Niski 27' (o.g.)

Indoor Stadium Huamark, Bangkok
Attendance: 20
Referee: Wahyu Wicaksono (Indonesia)
5 April 2022
13:00

Timor-Leste	1–7	Vietnam
Barreto 17'	Report	Nguyễn Thịnh Phát 1', 20'; Trần Thái Huy 19'; Lê Quốc Nam 22'; Nguyễn Văn Hiếu 23', 38'; Nguyễn Minh Trí 30'

Indoor Stadium Huamark, Bangkok
Attendance: 50
Referee: Ali Hafizi (Iran)

6 April 2022
11:00

Vietnam	5–1	Australia
Nguyễn Thịnh Phát 13', 34'; Trần Thái Huy 29'; Châu Đoàn Phát 35'; Nguyễn Văn Hiếu 38'	Report	Fornito 27' (pen.)

Indoor Stadium Huamark, Bangkok
Attendance: 25
Referee: Husain Ali Al-Bahhar (Bahrain)
6 April 2022
13:00

Myanmar	10–3	Timor-Leste
Myo Thet Aung 7', 9', 13'; Hlaing Min Tun 8', 12', 14', 34'; Thyne Phwet Aung 9'; Myo Myint Soe 21'; Wai Zin Oo 27'	Report	Guterres 13'; Mesquita 19'; M. Fernandes 23'

Indoor Stadium Huamark, Bangkok
Attendance: 50
Referee: Abdulaziz Al-Sarraf (Kuwait)

=== Semi-finals ===
The winners qualified for 2022 AFC Futsal Asian Cup.

8 April 2022
14:30

Myanmar	1–6	Indonesia
Hlaing Min Tun 37'	Report	Syauqi 17'; Soumilena 23'; Ardiansyah 25', 35'; Sulistyo 40'; Firman 40'

Indoor Stadium Huamark, Bangkok
Attendance: 250
Referee: Ali Hafizi (Iran)
8 April 2022
17:00

Thailand	3–1	Vietnam
Osamanmusa 22', 36'; Kritsada 39'	Report	Nguyễn Minh Trí 32'

Indoor Stadium Huamark, Bangkok
Attendance: 800
Referee: Fahad Al-Hosani (United Arab Emirates)

=== Third place match ===
The winner qualified for 2022 AFC Futsal Asian Cup.

10 April 2022
14:30

Myanmar	1–1	Vietnam
Khin Zaw Lin 39'	Report	Nguyễn Thịnh Phát 29'
Penalties
Myo Myint Soe (penalty missed); Aung Zin Oo (penalty missed); Nyein Min Soe (penalty scored)	1–4	(penalty scored) Trần Văn Vũ; (penalty scored) Phạm Đức Hoà; (penalty scored) Khổng Đình Hùng; (penalty scored) Nguyễn Minh Trí

Indoor Stadium Huamark, Bangkok
Attendance: 1,000
Referee: Fahad Al-Hosani (United Arab Emirates)

=== Final ===
10 April 2022
17:00

Indonesia	2–2	Thailand
Soumilena 8'; Ardiansyah 25'	Report	Krit 40'; Osamanmusa 40'
Penalties
Firman (penalty scored); Ardiansyah (penalty missed); Syauqi (penalty scored); Ardiansyah N. (penalty scored)	3–5	(penalty scored) Osamanmusa; (penalty scored) Ronnachai; (penalty scored) Panat; (penalty scored) Krit; (penalty scored) Peerapat

Indoor Stadium Huamark, Bangkok
Referee: Abdulrahman Al-Doseri (Bahrain)

== Qualified teams ==
The following 16 teams qualified for the final tournament.

Team	Qualified as	Qualified on	Previous appearances in AFC Futsal Championship^{1}
Kuwait	Hosts	25 January 2021	11 (2001, 2002, 2003, 2004, 2005, 2006, 2007, 2008, 2010, 2012, 2014)
Lebanon	West Zone Group A winners	6 April 2022	11 (2003, 2004, 2005, 2006, 2007, 2008, 2010, 2012, 2014, 2016, 2018)
Bahrain	West Zone Group B runners-up	6 April 2022	2 (2002, 2018)
Iraq	West Zone Group B winners	6 April 2022	11 (2001, 2002, 2003, 2005, 2006, 2007, 2008, 2010, 2014, 2016, 2018)
Saudi Arabia	West Zone Group A runners-up	7 April 2022	1 (2016)
Indonesia	ASEAN Zone runners-up	8 April 2022	9 (2002, 2003, 2004, 2005, 2006, 2008, 2010, 2012, 2014)
Thailand	ASEAN Zone winners	8 April 2022	15 (1999, 2000, 2001, 2002, 2003, 2004, 2005, 2006, 2007, 2008, 2010, 2012, 2014, 2016, 2018)
Oman	West Zone Play-off winners	9 April 2022	0 (debut)
Vietnam	ASEAN Zone third place	10 April 2022	5 (2005, 2010, 2014, 2016, 2018)
Uzbekistan	Central & South Zone Group B winners	11 April 2022	15 (1999, 2000, 2001, 2002, 2003, 2004, 2005, 2006, 2007, 2008, 2010, 2012, 2014, 2016, 2018)
Iran	Central & South Zone Group A winners	11 April 2022	15 (**1999**, **2000**, **2001**, **2002**, **2003**, **2004**, **2005**, 2006, **2007**, **2008**, **2010**, 2012, 2014, **2016**, **2018**)
Tajikistan	Central & South Zone Group B runners-up	12 April 2022	10 (2001, 2005, 2006, 2007, 2008, 2010, 2012, 2014, 2016, 2018)
Turkmenistan	Central & South Zone Group A runners-up	12 April 2022	6 (2005, 2006, 2007, 2008, 2010, 2012)
Japan	East Zone winners	19 May 2022	15 (1999, 2000, 2001, 2002, 2003, 2004, 2005, **2006**, 2007, 2008, 2010, **2012**, **2014**, 2016, 2018)
South Korea	East Zone runners-up	19 May 2022	13 (1999, 2000, 2001, 2002, 2003, 2004, 2005, 2007, 2008, 2010, 2012, 2014, 2018)
Chinese Taipei	East Zone third place	20 May 2022	12 (2001, 2002, 2003, 2004, 2005, 2006, 2008, 2010, 2012, 2014, 2016, 2018)

^{1} Bold indicates champions for that year. Italic indicates hosts for that year.

== Goalscorers ==
There were 377 goals scored in 52 matches, for an average of 7.25 goals per match.

11 goals

- (Thailand) Muhammad Osamanmusa

9 goals

- (Indonesia) Ardiansyah

8 goals

- (Indonesia) Holypaul Soumilena

6 goals

- (Indonesia) Syauqi Saud
- (Iran) Saeid Ahmadabbasi
- (Thailand) Kritsada Wongkaeo

5 goals

- (Iran) Hossein Tayyebi
- (Japan) Vinícius Crepaldi
- (Japan) Shunta Uchida
- (Lebanon) Mustafa Rhyem
- (Myanmar) Hlaing Min Tun
- (Tajikistan) Fayzali Sardorov
- (Vietnam) Nguyễn Thịnh Phát

4 goals

- (Afghanistan) Abdul Ghafar Sadeqi
- (Indonesia) Ardiansyah Nur
- (Japan) Sora Kanazawa
- (Japan) Arthur Oliveira
- (Japan) Atsuya Uemura
- (Oman) Muatasim Al-Shamsi
- (Palestine) Adnan Salloum
- (Tajikistan) Idris Yorov
- (Thailand) Peerapat Kaewwilai
- (Uzbekistan) Ikhtiyor Ropiev

3 goals

- (Cambodia) Orkchan Sereyvong
- (Chinese Taipei) Chi Sheng-fa
- (Chinese Taipei) Lin Chih-hung
- (Chinese Taipei) Liu Ju-ming
- (Iran) Hamzeh Kadkhoda
- (Iran) Alireza Rafieipour
- (Iran) Masoud Shavardazi
- (Japan) Gensuke Mori
- (Japan) Takehiro Motoishi
- (Malaysia) Abu Haniffa
- (Malaysia) Farhan Khairul
- (Myanmar) Myo Thet Aung
- (Myanmar) Thyne Phwet Aung
- (Saudi Arabia) Fahad Rudayni
- (Thailand) Krit Aransanyalak
- (Thailand) Ronnachai Jungwongsuk
- (Thailand) Panat Kittipanuwong
- (Turkmenistan) Daýanç Garajayew
- (Uzbekistan) Davron Choriev
- (Uzbekistan) Khusniddin Nishonov
- (Vietnam) Nguyễn Văn Hiếu

2 goals

- (Afghanistan) Ali Amiri
- (Afghanistan) Mohammad Reza Karimi
- (Australia) Shervin Adeli
- (Australia) Daniel Fornito
- (Australia) Scott Rogan
- (Cambodia) Chanmony Tong
- (Hong Kong) Chow Ka Lok
- (Hong Kong) Chow Ka Wa
- (Indonesia) Dewa Rizki
- (Indonesia) Firman Ardiansyah
- (Iran) Salar Aghapour
- (Iran) Mohammad Derakhshani
- (Japan) Kokoro Harada
- (Japan) António Hirata
- (Japan) Minami Kato
- (Japan) Tomoki Yoshikawa
- (Kyrgyzstan) Azamat Dolotkeldiev
- (Lebanon) Hassan Zeitoun
- (Malaysia) Ekmal Shahrin
- (Malaysia) Khairul Effendy
- (Malaysia) Joshua Lee
- (Malaysia) Saiful Nizam
- (Malaysia) Sufri Shamil
- (Myanmar) Myo Myint Soe
- (Myanmar) Nyein Min Soe
- (Oman) Zamel Al-Balushi
- (Palestine) Rashid Shawahna
- (Saudi Arabia) Mansour Al-Zahrani
- (South Korea) Hwang Un
- (South Korea) Shin Jong-hoon
- (Tajikistan) Shavqat Halimov
- (Tajikistan) Umed Kuziev
- (Tajikistan) Samandar Rizomov
- (Thailand) Apiwat Chaemcharoen
- (Thailand) Sarawut Phalaphruek
- (Timor-Leste) Miguel Fernandes
- (Timor-Leste) Joaquim Mesquita
- (Turkmenistan) Allamyrat Gurbanow
- (Turkmenistan) Gurbangeldi Sähedow
- (Uzbekistan) Dilshod Rakhmatov
- (Uzbekistan) Akbar Usmonov
- (Vietnam) Nguyễn Minh Trí
- (Vietnam) Trần Thái Huy

1 goal

- (Afghanistan) Sayed Hashemi
- (Afghanistan) Hamid Reza Hossaini
- (Afghanistan) Farzad Mahmoodi
- (Afghanistan) Mortaza Mohammadi
- (Australia) Jordan Guerreiro
- (Australia) Anthony Haddad
- (Australia) Nicholas Rathjen
- (Bahrain) Ahmed Abdulnabi
- (Bahrain) Salman Maula
- (Brunei) Zairul Hazmin
- (Cambodia) Diamant Prum
- (Cambodia) Ros Sichamroeun
- (Cambodia) Ros Sirotha
- (Cambodia) Sothydaroth Lun
- (Chinese Taipei) Chen Ching-hsuan
- (Chinese Taipei) Chu Chia-wei
- (Chinese Taipei) He Chia-chen
- (Chinese Taipei) Huang Wei-lun
- (Hong Kong) Lee Ho Wo
- (Indonesia) Iqbal Rahmattulah
- (Indonesia) Rio Pangestu
- (Indonesia) Sunny Rizky
- (Indonesia) Guntur Sulistyo
- (Indonesia) Marvin Wossiry
- (Iran) Masoud Abbasi
- (Iran) Morteza Ezzati
- (Iran) Mahdi Karimi
- (Iraq) Salim Faisal
- (Iraq) Rafid Hameed
- (Iraq) Ali Haqi
- (Japan) Guilherme Kuromoto
- (Japan) Masataka Takami
- (Japan) Yuta Tsutsumi
- (Kyrgyzstan) Aidarbek Abdyzhalil Uulu
- (Kyrgyzstan) Maksat Alimov
- (Kyrgyzstan) Abdurakhim Daniiar Uulu
- (Kyrgyzstan) Azamat Isabekov
- (Kyrgyzstan) Shokhrukh Makhmadaminov
- (Kyrgyzstan) Mirlan Zholdubaev
- (Lebanon) Kassem Kawsan
- (Lebanon) Mohamad Kobeissy
- (Malaysia) Aidil Shahril
- (Malaysia) Ridzwan Bakri
- (Maldives) Hussain Shareef
- (Mongolia) Amarsaikhan Temüülen
- (Mongolia) Ankhbayar Tumurbaatar
- (Myanmar) Hein Min Soe
- (Myanmar) Khin Zaw Lin
- (Myanmar) Wai Zin Oo
- (Nepal) Aadil Hamid
- (Nepal) Mani Lama
- (Nepal) Sumit Shrestha
- (Oman) Samer Al-Balushi
- (Oman) Mohammed Taqi
- (Oman) Khalfan Al-Maawali
- (Palestine) Imad Fahjan
- (Palestine) Ahmed Mohammed
- (Saudi Arabia) Nasser Al-Harthi
- (Saudi Arabia) Fares Al-Maleh
- (Saudi Arabia) Aroan Mubarak
- (Saudi Arabia) Abdulrahman Al-Mulla
- (Saudi Arabia) Abdulilah Al-Otaibi
- (South Korea) Ahn Kwang-su
- (South Korea) Eom Tae-youn
- (South Korea) Kang Juk-wang
- (South Korea) Kim Min-kuk
- (South Korea) Kim Yun-young
- (South Korea) Lee Ahn
- (South Korea) Seo Jung-woo
- (Tajikistan) Dilshod Salomov
- (Tajikistan) Muhamadjon Sharipov
- (Thailand) Supakorn Bovonratcadakul
- (Thailand) Atsadawut Jangkot
- (Thailand) Tanapol Maneepetch
- (Timor-Leste) Cesario Barreto
- (Timor-Leste) Venceslau Guterres
- (Timor-Leste) Bendito Ximenes
- (Turkmenistan) Mülkaman Annagulyýew
- (Turkmenistan) Meretgeldi Baýramow
- (Turkmenistan) Kadyr Berenow
- (United Arab Emirates) Abdulla Al-Falasi
- (United Arab Emirates) Khalid Al-Hammadi
- (United Arab Emirates) Rashid Obaid
- (Uzbekistan) Abbos Elmurodov
- (Vietnam) Châu Đoàn Phát
- (Vietnam) Lê Quốc Nam
- (Vietnam) Nhan Gia Hưng

1 own goal

- (Australia) Dylan Niski (against Myanmar)
- (Australia) Ahmed Sweedan (against Timor Leste)
- (Brunei) Abdul Khaaliq (against Thailand)
- (Brunei) Aiman Haji (against Thailand)
- (Brunei) Juma Metali (against Malaysia)
- (Cambodia) Diamant Prum (against Indonesia)
- (Cambodia) Duk Sophath (against Brunei)
- (Cambodia) Lak Phirun (against Thailand)
- (Cambodia) Ros Sichamroeun (against Malaysia)
- (Maldives) Saamin Naseer (against Kyrgyzstan)
- (Mongolia) Erdene-Undrakh Battogtokh (against Japan)
- (Mongolia) Ankhbayar Tumurbaatar (against Japan)
- (Oman) Mohammed Taqi (against Lebanon)
- (Saudi Arabia) Nasser Al-Harthi (against Lebanon)
- (Tajikistan) Idris Yorov (against Afghanistan)
- (Turkmenistan) Şiri Baýramdurdyýew (against Iran)

2 own goals

- (Brunei) Khalil Saab (against Indonesia, Cambodia)
- (South Korea) Lee Jin-hyuk (against Japan, Hong Kong)
