= Masoud Yousef =

Iranian futsal player (born 2000)

Masoud Yousef Shavardazi
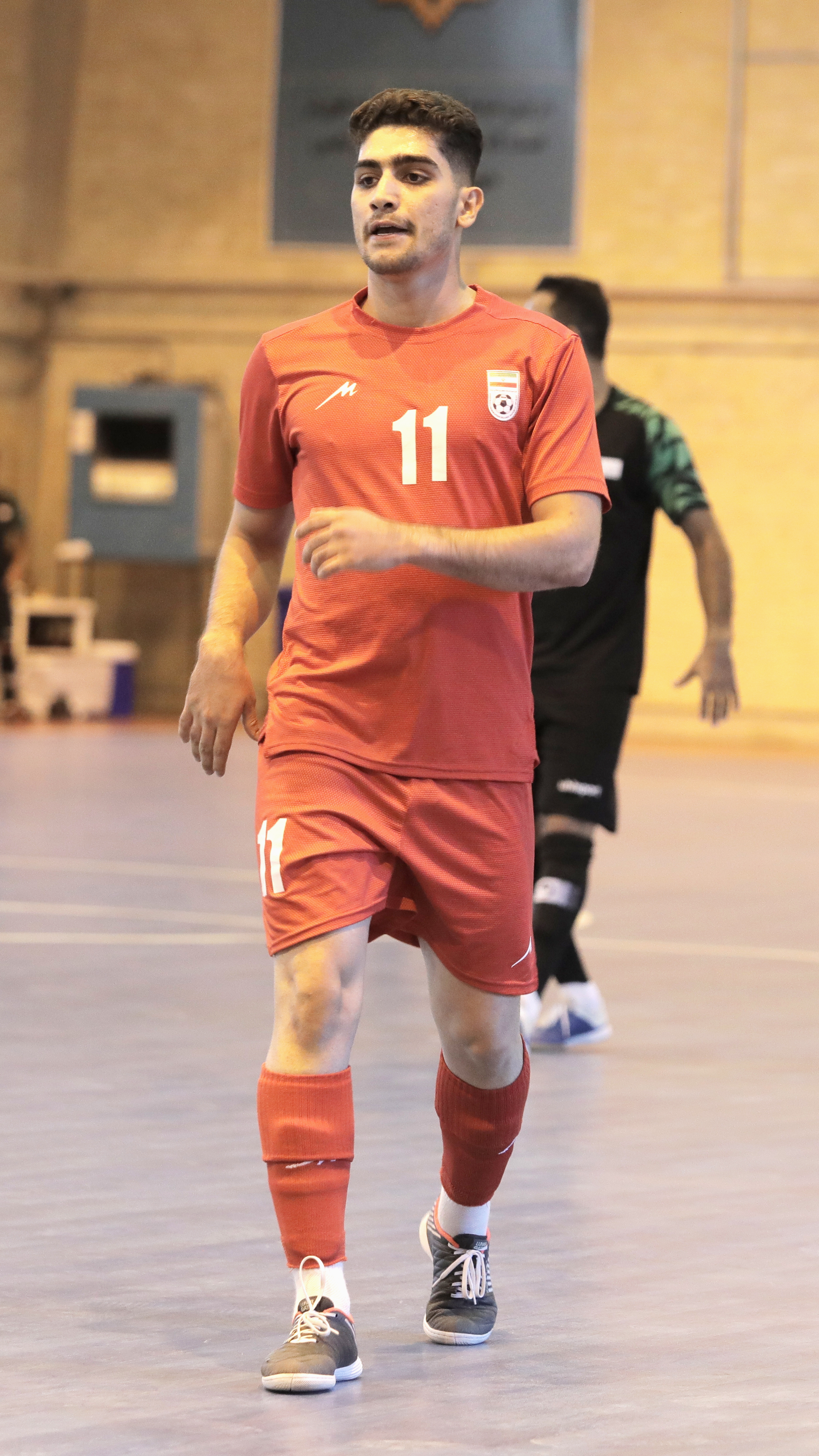

Personal information
- Full name: Masoud Yousef Shavardazi
- Date of birth: 27 October 2000 (age 26)
- Place of birth: Isfahan, Iran
- Height: 1.75 m (5 ft 9 in)
- Position: Flank

Team information
- Current team: Giti Pasand
- Number: 13

Youth career
- 2013-2017: Isfahan Students Club
- 2014-2017: Bayab F.C

Senior career*
Years	Team	Apps	(Gls)
2018-2019	Sadra F.C	16	(7)
2019-	Giti Pasand	136	(34)

International career^{‡}
2017-2018	Iran U18	5	(2)
2018-2019	Iran U20	12	(6)
2019-	Iran	25	(5)
Medal record
Representing Iran
Men's Futsal as player
Torneo Delle Nazioni U18
Gold medal – first place	2018 Italy
CTFA U20 Futsal Invitation
Bronze medal – third place	2019 Chinese Taipei
AFC U-20 Futsal Asian Cup
Bronze medal – third place	2019 Tabriz
CAFA Futsal Cup
Gold medal – first place	2023 Tajikistan
AFC Futsal Asian Cup
Gold medal – first place	2024 Thailand
Gold medal – first place	2026 Indonesia
- * Club domestic league appearances and goals as of 14 September 2024 ‡ National team caps and goals as of 14 September 2024

Masoud Yousef Shavardazi (Persian:مسعود یوسف شوردزی); (born 27 October 2000) is an Iranian futsal player who plays as a flank for Gity Pasand and the Iranian national futsal team.

== Early life ==
Masoud was born on 27 October 2000, in a family from Isfahan. In his early years, he had developed a passion for sports, which made him to start his career from the Sepahan SC talent Program. Yusuf played football until the end of elementary school, and then joined the Isfahan student futsal team and Bayab F.C.

== Honors ==
Club honors:

- Emerging talent of the league 1 in 2018 with Sadra Shiraz
- Champion of the U20 Premier League in 2018 with Gity Pasand
- Runner-up of the U20 Premier League in 2019 with Gity Pasand
- Runner-up of the Iranian Futsal Super League in 2018–19 season with Gity Pasand
- Runner-up of the Iranian Futsal Super League in 2019–20 season with Gity Pasand
- Champion of the Iranian Futsal Super League in 2020–21 season with Gity Pasand
- Runner-up of the Iranian Futsal Super League in 2021–22 season with Gity Pasand
- Champion of the Iranian Futsal Super League in 2022–23 season with Gity Pasand

National:

- Champion of the Torneo Delle Nazioni U18 with the youth national team in 2018
- The third place of the CTFA U20 Futsal Invitation with the U20 National Team in 2019
- The third place of the AFC U-20 Futsal Asian Cup in 2019
- Qualifiers at the 2021 AFC Asian Cup with the national team
- Champion of the 2023 CAFA Futsal Cup with U20 national team
- Champion of the 2024 AFC Futsal Asian Cup with Iran national futsal team
