= Seyed Hossein Mousavi =

Afghan futsal player (born 2001)

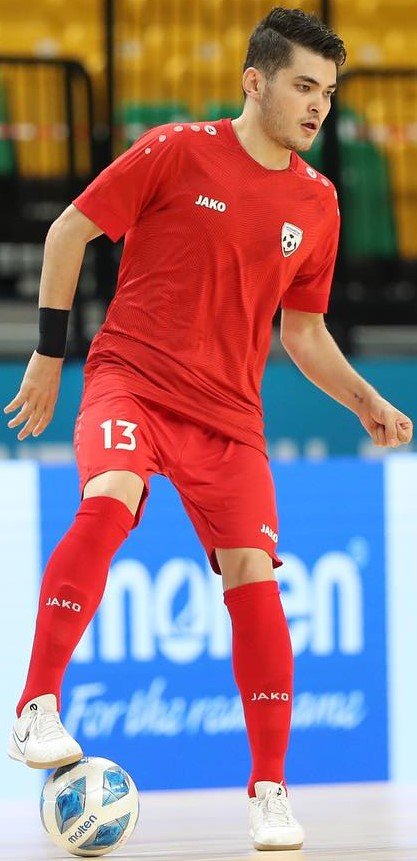
- Mousavi with Afghanistan in 2023

Personal information
- Full name: Seyed Hossein Mousavi
- Date of birth: March 13, 2001 (age 25)
- Place of birth: Bamyan Province, Afghanistan
- Height: 1.77 m (5 ft 10 in)
- Positions: Pivot; winger

Team information
- Current team: FC Daem Panah MAshhad
- Number: 13

Youth career
- 2012–2015: Kabul Youth
- 2015–2016: Zire Kafsh Rahimi
- 2017–2018: Moud Piradel Mashhad
- 2019: Moud Roshanavand Gonabad

Senior career*
Years	Team	Apps	(Gls)
2020	Al-Ghobeiry FC	4	(6)
2022	Rokn Azin Khavarmiyaneh	2	(0)
2023	Sadaqat Kabul	9	(8)
2023–2024	Iralco Arak	18	(5)
2024	Al-Tai	6	(9)
2024	Saadat Nimroz	9	(5)
2024–2025	Al-Tai	6	(8)
2025	Noorzad Nimroz	18	(9)
2025–2026	Shahrdari Saveh	4	(1)
2026-	FC Daem Panah Mashhad	1	(0)
Total		73	(50)

International career^{‡}
2018–2019	Afghanistan U20	14	(13)
2019–	Afghanistan	39	(21)
Medal record
Silver medal – second place	AFC Championship U20 2019 Tabriz
Silver medal – second place	Second Goal Scorer in AFC Championship U20 2019 Tabriz
Gold medal – first place	Afghanistan Premier League 2023
Silver medal – second place	Central Asian Football Assocition (CAFA) Tajikistan 2023
Bronze medal – third place	Inter Continental Thailand 2023
Silver medal – second place	Afghanistan Premier League 2024
Bronze medal – third place	Afghanistan Premier League 2025
Silver medal – second place	Copa Das Nações De Futsal 2026
- * Club domestic league appearances and goals as of 01 November 2025 ‡ National team caps and goals as of 01 November 2025

Seyed Hossein Mousavi (Persian: سید حسین موسوی; born 13 March 2001) is an Afghan futsal player who plays as a pivot or winger for FC Daem Panah MAshhad in Iran Futsal Premier League and the Afghanistan national futsal team.

He has played professionally in Lebanon, Afghanistan, Iran, and Saudi Arabia, and was part of Afghanistan's U20 team that finished runners-up at the 2019 AFC U-20 Futsal Championship.

== Club career ==
Mousavi was born in Bamyan Province, Afghanistan. He moved to Iran during his youth, where he developed his sporting career in the Mashhad region, playing both football and futsal at youth level before focusing on futsal.

Mousavi began his club career in 2017 with Moud Piradel Mashhad. In 2019, he moved to Ghobeiry Beirut in Lebanon. In 2022, he signed with Rokn Azin (formerly Chips Kamel Mashhad). Later in 2022, he joined Sadaqat Kabul in the Afghanistan Premier League and won the league championship with the team.

In 2023, Mousavi became a member of the futsal club of Iralco Arak in the Iranian Premier League. Later that year, he signed with the futsal club of Al-Tai in the Saudi Arabia Premier League.

In early 2024, he joined Saadat Nimroz and finished as the runner-up of the Afghan Premier League. Mousavi later returned to the futsal club of Al-Tai and played another season with the team. In the fourth season of the Afghanistan Premier League, he signed with Nowzad Nimroz and the team finished in third place. He is currently a member of FC Daem PAnah Mashhad and is expected to play for them in the second half of the Iranian Premier League season.

== International career ==
Mousavi was called up to the Afghanistan U20 in 2018. He contributed to the team's qualification for the final round of the AFC U-20 Futsal Championship. In 2019, Mousavi and the U20 team finished as runners-up in the tournament. Since 2019, he has been a member of the Afghanistan national futsal team and continues to represent the senior national team in international competitions.

=== International goals ===
Seyyed Hossein Mousavi's goals for the Afghanistan national futsal team:

No.	Date	Venue	Opponent	Goals	Result	Competition
1	24 October 2019	Ghadir Arena, Urmia, Iran	Tajikistan	1	5–2	2020 AFC Futsal Championship qualification
2	24 October 2019	Ghadir Arena, Urmia, Iran	Nepal	2	6–2	2020 AFC Futsal Championship qualification
3	29 May 2023	Beirut, Lebanon	Lebanon	1	2–2	Friendly
4	24 July 2023	Dushanbe, Tajikistan	Uzbekistan	1	3–4	2023 CAFA Futsal Cup
5	7 August 2023	Bangkok, Thailand	Czech Republic	1	4–4	Thailand Intercontinental Championship
6	2 October 2023	Bangkok, Thailand	Kyrgyzstan	2	3–4	Friendly
7	8 October 2023	Dammam, Saudi Arabia	Saudi Arabia	1	2–3	2024 AFC Futsal Asian Cup qualification
8	11 October 2023	Dammam, Saudi Arabia	Macau	5	2–18	2024 AFC Futsal Asian Cup qualification
9	13 April 2025	Rabat, Morocco	China	1	2–6	Friendly
10	15 April 2025	Rabat, Morocco	Morocco	2	7–4	Friendly
11	20 September 2025	Yangon, Myanmar	Maldives	1	1–10	2026 AFC Futsal Asian Cup qualification
12	24 September 2025	Yangon, Myanmar	Myanmar	1	0–8	2026 AFC Futsal Asian Cup qualification
	17 October 2026	Curitiba , Brazil	Cape Verde	1	2-4	Copa Das Nações De Futsal 2026

== Honours ==
Moud Roshanavand Gonabad

- Khorasan Razavi Youth Premier League: 2019

Sadaqat Kabul

- Afghan Futsal Premier League: 2023

Saadat Nimroz

- Afghan Futsal Premier League runner-up: 2024

Nowzad Nimroz

- Afghan Futsal Premier League third place: 2025

Afghanistan U-20

- AFC U-20 Futsal Championship runner-up: Tabriz 2019
- AFC U-20 Futsal Championship second top scorer: Tabriz 2019

Afghanistan

- CAFA Futsal Championship runner-up: Tajikistan 2023
- Intercontinental Futsal Cup third place: Thailand 2023
