= Behrooz Azimi =

Iranian futsal player

Personal information
- Full name: Behrooz Azimi Hematabadi
- Date of birth: 25 August 2001 (age 25)
- Place of birth: Hematabad, Bakharz, Razavi Khorasan Province, Iran
- Height: 1.85 m (6 ft 1 in)
- Position: Pivot

Team information
- Current team: Gohar Zamin Sirjan

Senior career*
Years	Team	Apps	(Gls)
2019	Estedad-e Derakhshan Mashhad		
2020	Shahid Mansouri Gharchak		
2021–2023	Moghavemat Alborz		
2023–2026	Mes Sungun Varzaghan		
2026–	Gohar Zamin Sirjan		

International career
2022–	Iran		
- * Club domestic league appearances and goals

Behrooz Azimi (Persian: بهروز عظیمی; born 25 August 2001) is an Iranian futsal player who plays as a pivot for Gohar Zamin Sirjan and the Iran national futsal team.

== Early life ==
Azimi was born in the village of Hematabad near Bakharz, Razavi Khorasan Province. He initially played team handball as a goalkeeper before moving to futsal. He was later selected for Iran's youth teams and was named the best player at an Iranian youth talent tournament.

== Club career ==
Azimi began his senior career with Estedad-e Derakhshan Mashhad and subsequently played for Shahid Mansouri Gharchak. He also spent a period with Setaregan Varamin before joining Moghavemat Alborz. During the 2022 Iranian Futsal Super League season, he scored four goals in Moghavemat Alborz's 5–2 win over Farsh Ara Mashhad and was among the league's leading scorers.

In March 2023, Azimi joined Mes Sungun Varzaghan. He became a regular scorer for the club and was named the Young Revelation of the Year for the 2023 season at the Iranian futsal awards.

In the 2025–26 season, Azimi was one of Mes Sungun's main scorers and helped the club finish as runners-up in the Iranian Futsal Super League.

In October 2025, he was briefly removed from Mes Sungun's squad following a disciplinary incident during training, before returning to the team shortly afterwards.

In December 2025, he scored twice in Mes Sungun's 6–2 comeback victory over Palayesh Naft Bandar Abbas.

In May 2026, Azimi left Mes Sungun and joined Gohar Zamin Sirjan. In September 2026, he scored twice in Gohar Zamin's 6–0 win over Foolad Zarand after a three-match scoreless start to the season.

== International career ==
Azimi represented Iran at youth level before joining the senior national team. He was part of the Iran under-20 squad that finished third at an international tournament in Thailand in 2020.

In 2023, he won the CAFA Futsal Championship with Iran and finished runner-up at the Copa das Nações de Futsal 2023 in Brazil.

He scored twice against Lebanon during the qualifying competition for the 2024 AFC Futsal Asian Cup.

At the 2024 AFC Futsal Asian Cup, Azimi scored three goals, including against Bahrain, Kyrgyzstan and Uzbekistan, as Iran won its record-extending 13th Asian title. Iran's 6–1 quarter-final win over Kyrgyzstan also secured qualification for the 2024 FIFA Futsal World Cup, with Azimi scoring the opening goal.

Azimi made his FIFA Futsal World Cup 2024 debut in Uzbekistan and scored three goals during the tournament. He scored twice in Iran's 7–1 win over Venezuela and once in the 9–4 win over Guatemala. FIFA also listed him among the leading scorers of the tournament.

In the 2026 AFC Futsal Asian Cup qualification tournament, Azimi scored once against Bangladesh and twice against the United Arab Emirates.

At the 2026 AFC Futsal Asian Cup, Azimi was part of the Iran squad that retained the title. He scored four goals during the competition, against Malaysia, Afghanistan, Uzbekistan and Iraq. He scored the equaliser in the semi-final against Iraq with a long-range strike as Iran won 4–2. Iran subsequently defeated Indonesia on penalties after a 5–5 draw after extra time to win the continental title for the 14th time.

== Honours ==
=== Iran U-20 ===
- Third place at an international tournament in Thailand: 2020

=== Iran ===
- CAFA Futsal Championship: 2023
- Runner-up at the Copa das Nações de Futsal: 2023
- AFC Futsal Asian Cup: 2024, 2026

=== Club ===
- Runner-up Iranian Futsal Super League: 2025–26 (Mes Sungun Varzaghan)

=== Individual ===
- Young Revelation of the Year: 2023
