= Afghanistan national futsal team =

National futsal team of Afghanistan

Afghanistan
- Nickname(s): شیران خراسان (The Lions of Khorasan)
- Association: Afghanistan Football Federation (AFF)
- Confederation: AFC (Asia)
- Head coach: Dejan Djedovic
- FIFA code: AFG
- FIFA ranking: 22 ▼1 (24 September 2026)
- Highest FIFA ranking: 21 (6 May 2026)
| Home colours | Away colours |

First international
- Thailand 23–2 Afghanistan (Macau, Macau; 26 October 2007)

Biggest win
- Afghanistan 18–2 Macau (Dammam, Saudi Arabia; 11 October 2023)

Biggest defeat
- Thailand 23–2 Afghanistan (Macau, Macau; 26 October 2007)

FIFA World Cup
- Appearances: 1 (First in 2024)
- Best result: Round of 16 (2024)

AFC Futsal Asian Cup
- Appearances: 1 (First in 2024)
- Best result: Quarter-final (2024)

CAFA Futsal Cup
- Appearances: 1 (First in 2023)
- Best result: Runners-up (2023)

The Afghanistan national futsal team is controlled by the Afghanistan Football Federation and represents Afghanistan in the international futsal competitions.

== History ==
=== 2023 ===
Afghanistan came second in the first edition of the CAFA Futsal Cup at the 2023 tournament.

=== 2024 ===
Afghanistan qualified for the 2024 tournament of the AFC Futsal Asian Cup for the first time, where they finished in fifth place. Afghanistan qualified for the 2024 tournament of the FIFA Futsal World Cup for the first time as well where they finished in 16th place. The national team reached its highest ranking in the Futsal World Rankings at 30th place in May 2024.

=== 2025 ===
Afghanistan qualified for the 2026 AFC Futsal Asian Cup.

== Team image ==
=== Nicknames ===
The Afghanistan national futsal team is dubbed by the media and supporters as شیران خراسان (The Lions of Khorasan).

== Results and fixtures ==
Win Draw Loss Fixture

== Players ==
=== Last selected squad ===
- Match date: 15 September 2024
- Tournament: 2024 FIFA Futsal World Cup
- Correct as of: October 2023

| No. | Pos. | Player | Date of birth (age) | Club |
|---|---|---|---|---|
| 1 | GK | Mohammad Javad Safari | 16 March 2000 (aged 24) | (Football Federation Islamic Republic of Iran) Giti Pasand |
| 2 | GK | Ali Reza Jafari | 23 January 2005 (aged 19) | (Football Federation Islamic Republic of Iran) Safir Gofteman |
| 3 | GK | Ali Ahmad Mohseni | 3 June 2003 (aged 21) | (Afghanistan Football Federation) Sidaqat Kabul |
| 4 | DF | Mahdi Nowrozi (captain) | 11 May 1996 (aged 28) | (Football Federation Islamic Republic of Iran) Sunich Saveh |
| 5 | MF | Hussain Mohammadi | 28 January 2005 (aged 19) | (Football Federation Islamic Republic of Iran) Farsh Ara Mashhad |
| 6 | MF | Hamid Reza Hossaini | 30 September 2000 (aged 23) | (Afghanistan Football Federation) Saadat Nimrooz |
| 7 | DF | Reza Hosseinpoor | 23 August 1999 (aged 25) | (Afghanistan Football Federation) Asree Jadid |
| 8 | MF | Mehran Gholami | 31 October 2005 (aged 18) | (Afghanistan Football Federation) Sidaqat Kabul |
| 9 | FW | Omid Qanbari | 29 June 2004 (aged 20) | (Afghanistan Football Federation) Sidaqat Kabul |
| 10 | FW | Akbar Kazemi | 12 May 1996 (aged 28) | (Afghanistan Football Federation) Sidaqat Kabul |
| 11 | MF | Mohammad Moradi | 22 May 2005 (aged 19) | (Football Federation Islamic Republic of Iran) Giti Pasand |
| 12 | MF | Farzad Mahmoodi | 14 April 1999 (aged 25) | (Afghanistan Football Federation) Piroze Panjsher |
| 13 | DF | Khodadad Ebrahimi | 2 March 2004 (aged 20) | (Afghanistan Football Federation) Sidaqat Kabul |
| 14 | DF | Sayed Mojtaba Hosseini | 6 October 2003 (aged 20) | (Afghanistan Football Federation) Saadat Nimrooz |

== Competitive record ==
=== FIFA Futsal World Cup ===
FIFA Futsal World Cup record
| Year | Round | Position | Pld | W | D | L | GF | GA | Squad |
|---|---|---|---|---|---|---|---|---|---|
| (Netherlands) 1989 | Did not enter | | | | | | | | |
| (Hong Kong) 1992 | Did not enter | | | | | | | | |
| (Spain) 1996 | Did not enter | | | | | | | | |
| (Guatemala) 2000 | Did not enter | | | | | | | | |
| (Taiwan) 2004 | Did not enter | | | | | | | | |
| (Brazil) 2008 | Did not enter | | | | | | | | |
| (Thailand) 2012 | Did not enter | | | | | | | | |
| (Colombia) 2016 | Did not qualify | | | | | | | | |
| (Lithuania) 2021 | Did not qualify | | | | | | | | |
| (Uzbekistan) 2024 | Round of 16 | 16th | 4 | 1 | 0 | 3 | 9 | 13 | Squad |
| Total | Round of 16 | 1/10 | 4 | 1 | 0 | 3 | 9 | 13 | — |

=== AFC Futsal Asian Cup ===
| AFC Futsal Asian Cup record | | | | | | | | | | Qualification record | | | | | | |
| Year | Round | Position | Pld | W | D | L | GF | GA | Squad | Pld | W | D | L | GF | GA | Link |
|---|---|---|---|---|---|---|---|---|---|---|---|---|---|---|---|---|
| (Malaysia) 1999 | Did not enter | | | | | | | | | No qualification | | | | | | |
| (Thailand) 2000 | Did not enter | | | | | | | | | No qualification | | | | | | |
| (Iran) 2001 | Did not enter | | | | | | | | | No qualification | | | | | | |
| (Indonesia) 2002 | Did not enter | | | | | | | | | No qualification | | | | | | |
| (Iran) 2003 | Did not enter | | | | | | | | | No qualification | | | | | | |
| (Macau) 2004 | Did not enter | | | | | | | | | No qualification | | | | | | |
| (Vietnam) 2005 | Did not enter | | | | | | | | | No qualification | | | | | | |
| (Uzbekistan) 2006 | Did not enter | | | | | | | | | Did not enter | | | | | | Link |
| (Japan) 2007 | Did not enter | | | | | | | | | Did not enter | | | | | | Link |
| (Thailand) 2008 | Did not enter | | | | | | | | | Did not enter | | | | | | Link |
| (Uzbekistan) 2010 | Did not qualify | | | | | | | | | 3 | 0 | 0 | 3 | 5 | 20 | Link |
| (United Arab Emirates) 2012 | Did not enter | | | | | | | | | Did not enter | | | | | | Link |
| (Vietnam) 2014 | Did not enter | | | | | | | | | Did not enter | | | | | | Link |
| (Uzbekistan) 2016 | Did not qualify | | | | | | | | | 3 | 1 | 1 | 1 | 12 | 11 | Link |
| (Taiwan) 2018 | Did not qualify | | | | | | | | | 2 | 0 | 0 | 2 | 5 | 12 | Link |
| (Turkmenistan) 2020 | Cancelled | | | | | | | | | 3 | 1 | 0 | 2 | 10 | 13 | Link |
| (Kuwait) 2022 | Did not qualify | | | | | | | | | 3 | 1 | 1 | 1 | 13 | 10 | Link |
| (Thailand) 2024 | Quarter-final | 5th | 6 | 3 | 1 | 2 | 18 | 16 | Squad | 3 | 2 | 1 | 0 | 28 | 11 | Link |
| (Indonesia) 2026 | Quarter-final | TBD | 4 | 2 | 0 | 2 | 12 | 11 | Squad | 2 | 2 | 0 | 0 | 18 | 1 | Link |
| Total:2/18 | Quarter-final | 5th | 10 | 5 | 1 | 4 | 30 | 27 | — | 19 | 7 | 3 | 9 | 91 | 78 | - |

== Honours ==
=== Regional ===
- CAFA Futsal Cup
  - Runners-up (1): 2023
