= Gol Koochik =

Variation of street football

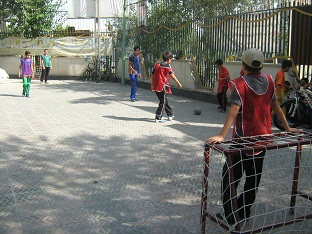
Gol Koochik settings

Gol Koochik (گل‌کوچیک in Persian spoken language, translates as "small goal" or small net) is a variation of street football that has been popular in Iran. The goal is approximately 100 x 60 cm in size and the ball is light-weight which can look like a makeshift ball. Given the limited space and the high density of player in the small-sized field, supreme dribbling skills are required for success in the game and players behoove to learn to maneuver the ball more quickly than normal football fields.

Pursuant to the effects of the Information Age, street football in general and Gol Koochik in particular have suffered from a weakened popularity over the past few years.

== Arrangement ==
Gol Koochik is in compliance with football and especially futsal in terms of scoring, physical contact and limitation of the field, outs and corners. There are differences, however, when it comes to the regulations for goal keeping and offside. In Gol Koochik, the keeper can not touch the ball with the hand, and saves must be done using only feet. This is due to the small scale of the goal and that it can be too easy to contain an attack if the keeper can use his hands. On the other hand, it would be too difficult to score if in such a small goal, the keeper could be allowed to use hands. This, in practice, means that everybody can be a goal keeper and the keeper can be a defender or striker at any given opportunity.

There is no offside in Gol Koochik and the strikers can be at any position when receiving the ball from teammates.

== See also ==
- Futsal in Iran
- Phutball
