= Chow Ka Lok =

Hong Kong footballer

Personal information
- Full name: Leo Chow Ka Lok
- Date of birth: 17 April 1999 (age 27)
- Place of birth: Hong Kong
- Height: 1.77 m (5 ft 10 in)
- Position: Midfielder

Youth career
- Freemen

Senior career*
Years	Team	Apps	(Gls)
2017–2020	Lee Man	1	(0)
2020–2022	Hong Kong Rangers	8	(0)
2021–2022	→ HK U23 (loan)	4	(0)
2022–2023	Sham Shui Po	17	(0)
2023–2024	North District	6	(0)
2024–	3 Sing	46	(5)
- * Club domestic league appearances and goals as of 26 May 2024

Leo Chow Ka Lok (Chinese: 周家樂; born 17 April 1999) is a former Hong Kong professional footballer who played as a midfielder.

== Club career ==
=== Rangers ===
On 10 September 2020, Rangers' Director of Football Philip Lee declared that Chow would join the club.

=== Sham Shui Po ===
On 8 August 2022, Chow joined Sham Shui Po.

=== North District ===
On 15 July 2023, Chow joined North District.

== Honours ==
=== Club ===
Lee Man

- Hong Kong Sapling Cup: 2017–18
