= Iqbal Iskandar =

Indonesian futsal player

Personal information
- Full name: Mochammad Iqbal Rahmatullah Iskandar
- Date of birth: 23 August 1995 (age 31)
- Place of birth: Bogor, West Java, Indonesia
- Position: Anchor

Team information
- Current team: Bintang Timur Surabaya

Senior career*
Years	Team	Apps	(Gls)
- Black Steel Manokwari
- Vamos Mataram
- Bintang Timur Surabaya

International career
- Indonesia (futsal)
- * Club domestic league appearances and goals

Mochammad Iqbal Rahmatullah Iskandar (born 23 August 1995) is an Indonesian professional futsal player who plays as an anchor for Bintang Timur Surabaya and the Indonesia national futsal team. He has served as captain of the national team and is considered one of the leading players in the Indonesian Pro Futsal League.

== Early life ==
Iqbal Iskandar was born in Bogor, West Java, Indonesia. He developed an interest in futsal at a young age and progressed through local competitions before entering the professional futsal league system in Indonesia.

== Club career ==
Iqbal began his professional career in Indonesia's futsal competitions, playing for several prominent clubs including Black Steel Manokwari, Vamos Mataram, and Bintang Timur Surabaya.

He achieved notable success in the Pro Futsal League (PFL), winning the league title with Black Steel Manokwari in 2016 and with Vamos Mataram in 2017 and 2018. He later continued his success with Bintang Timur Surabaya, contributing to the club's domestic achievements.

Individually, he was named Best Player of the Pro Futsal League in 2017 and 2018.

== International career ==
Iqbal Iskandar has represented the Indonesia national futsal team in regional and international competitions. He has served as team captain and played a key role in Indonesia's performances in Southeast Asian tournaments.

He was part of the squad that finished as runner-up in the AFF Futsal Championship in 2019 and 2022. and also finished as champion in 2024.

== Playing style ==
Iqbal primarily plays as an anchor, a defensive role in futsal responsible for organizing the team's defensive structure and initiating attacking plays from the back. He is known for his tactical awareness, positioning, and leadership on the court.

== Honours ==
=== Club ===
- Black Steel Manokwari
  - Pro Futsal League: 2016
- Vamos Mataram
  - Pro Futsal League: 2017, 2018
- Bintang Timur Surabaya
  - Pro Futsal League: (multiple titles)

=== International ===
- Indonesia
  - AFF Futsal Championship (champion): 2024
  - AFC Futsal Championship (runner up) : 2026

=== Individual ===
- Pro Futsal League Best Player: 2017, 2018, 2022–23, 2023-24
