= 2023 CAFA Futsal Cup =

International futsal event

Tournament details
- Host country: Tajikistan
- Dates: 23–30 July
- Teams: 6 (from 1 sub-confederation)
- Venue(s): 1 (in 1 host city)

Final positions
- Champions: Iran U23 (1st title)
- Runners-up: Afghanistan
- Third place: Uzbekistan

Tournament statistics
- Matches played: 15
- Goals scored: 71 (4.73 per match)
- Attendance: 13,631 (909 per match)
- Top scorer(s): (Uzbekistan) Khusniddin Nishonov (5 Goals)
- Best player(s): (Iran) Ali Akrami
- Best goalkeeper: (Iran) Mahdi Rostami
- Fair play award: Tajikistan

The 2023 CAFA Futsal Cup was the inaugural edition of the CAFA Futsal Championship, the international futsal championship contested by the men's national teams of the member associations of Central Asian Football Association.

Iran U23 national futsal team won the Tournament with 5 victories.

Iran national under-23 futsal team clinched the competition's title as they defeated Tajikistan one-nil on Sunday during Matchday 5, making them the inaugural champions.

== Participating teams ==
A total of 6 (out of 6) CAFA member national teams entered the tournament. Iran opted to field its under-23 side in the competition, rather than selecting its senior team.

Team	Appearance	Previous best performance
Afghanistan	1st	—
Iran U23	1st	—
Kyrgyz Republic	1st	—
Tajikistan	1st	—
Turkmenistan	1st	—
Uzbekistan	1st	—

== Match officials ==
Referees

== Main Tournament ==
Times are TJT (UTC+5).

Pos	Team	Pld	W	D	L	GF	GA	GD	Pts	Final result
1	Iran U23	5	4	0	1	13	3	+10	12	Champions
2	Afghanistan	5	3	1	1	15	16	−1	10	Runners-up
3	Uzbekistan	5	3	0	2	14	12	+2	9	Third place
4	Tajikistan (H)	5	2	1	2	13	12	+1	7	
5	Turkmenistan	5	2	0	3	9	11	−2	6	
6	Kyrgyz Republic	5	0	0	5	7	17	−10	0	

Updated to match(es) played on unknown. Source: CAFA
Rules for classification: Tiebreakers
(H) Hosts
23 July 2023
12:00

Kyrgyz Republic	4–5	Afghanistan
Talaibekov 5', 34'; Mahmadaminov 6'; Askarbekov 25'	Report (FFT); Report (CAFA)	Hossein Poor 10'; Fayazi 13'; Hossaini 15'; Gholami 18', 38'

Dushanbe Indoor Hall, Dushanbe
Attendance: 105
Referee: Anatoliy Rubakov (Uzbekistan)
Sukhrob Sattorov (Tajikistan)
Oybek Kalakhodjaev (Uzbekistan)
23 July 2023
15:00

Iran U23	1–2	Turkmenistan
Akrami 33'	Report (FFT); Report (CAFA)	Gylychmyradov 32'; Soltanov 38'

Dushanbe Indoor Hall, Dushanbe
Attendance: 300
Referee: Nikita Afinogenov (Uzbekistan)
Chyngyz Mustafaev (Kyrgyz Republic)
Eldiiar Keldibekov (Kyrgyz Republic)
23 July 2023
18:00

Uzbekistan	4–2	Tajikistan
Rakhmatov 16'; Nishonov 18'; Usmonov 24'; Khamroev 33'	Report (FFT); Report (CAFA)	Sardorov 19' (pen.); Salomov 25'

Dushanbe Indoor Hall, Dushanbe
Attendance: 800
Referee: Mohammad Tamim Hussaini (Afghanistan)
Ali Ahmadi (Iran)
Talantbek Raimberdiev (Kyrgyz Republic)

24 July 2023
14:00

Iran U23	1–0	Kyrgyz Republic
Rostami 38'	Report

Dushanbe Indoor Hall, Dushanbe
Attendance: 100
24 July 2023
17:00

Uzbekistan	3–4	Afghanistan
Nishonov 20', 20', 28'	Report	Hossaini 2'; Mousavi 34'; Fayazi 37'; Hossein Poor 40'

Dushanbe Indoor Hall, Dushanbe
Attendance: 150
24 July 2023
20:00

Tajikistan	4–2	Turkmenistan
Alimakhmadov 3'; Sardorov 6'; Sharipov 11'; Salomov 14'	Report	Bayramdurdyyev 6'; Idiev 36' (o.g)

Dushanbe Indoor Hall, Dushanbe
Attendance: 1,120

26 July 2023
14:00

Turkmenistan	1–3	Uzbekistan
Bayramdurdyyev 37'	Report	Ropiev 3'; Usmonov 13'; Khamroev 35'

Dushanbe Indoor Hall, Dushanbe
Attendance: 100
26 July 2023
17:00

Afghanistan	1–5	Iran U23
Gorgage 18'	Report	Azimihematabadi 3'; Kuraneh 8'; Balkaneh 11'; Somehsofla 30'; Shavardazi 36'

Dushanbe Indoor Hall, Dushanbe
Attendance: 1,000
26 July 2023
20:00

Tajikistan	5–3	Kyrgyz Republic
Alimakhmadov 9'; Sharipov 12'; Salomov 18'; Soliev 28'; Sardorov 39'	Report	Samat Uulu 5'; Ilyasov 10'; Askarbekov 17'

Dushanbe Indoor Hall, Dushanbe
Attendance: 2,500

28 July 2023
14:00

Iran U23	5–0	Uzbekistan
Somehsofla 2', 35'; Akrami 4'; Usmonov 8' (o.g.); Dehghanibangudi 33'	Report

Dushanbe Indoor Hall, Dushanbe
Attendance: 200
28 July 2023
17:00

Kyrgyz Republic	0–2	Turkmenistan
	Report	Annaguliyev 28'; Soltanov 37'

Dushanbe Indoor Hall, Dushanbe
Attendance: 104
28 July 2023
20:00

Afghanistan	2–2	Tajikistan
Gorgage 14'; Fayazi 35'	Report	Ismoilov 8'; Rizomov 38'

Dushanbe Indoor Hall, Dushanbe
Attendance: 3,298

30 July 2023
14:00

Turkmenistan	2–3	Afghanistan
Sahedov 33'; Gylychmyradov 39'	Report	Hossein Poor 22'; Sadeqi 28'; Gholami 39'

Dushanbe Indoor Hall, Dushanbe
Attendance: 289
30 July 2023
17:00

Uzbekistan	4–0	Kyrgyz Republic
Nishonov 10'; Solikhov 29'; Juraev 34'; Khamroev 40'	Report

Dushanbe Indoor Hall, Dushanbe
Attendance: 185
30 July 2023
20:00

Tajikistan	0–1	Iran U23
	Report	Bazar 25'

Dushanbe Indoor Hall, Dushanbe
Attendance: 3,380

== Goalscorers ==
There were 71 goals scored in 14 matches, for an average of 5.07 goals per match.

5 goals

- (Uzbekistan) Khusniddin Nishonov

3 goals

- (Afghanistan) Mohammad Ali Fayazi
- (Afghanistan) Reza Hossein Poor
- (Afghanistan) Mehran Gholami
- (Iran) Ali Khalilvand Somehsofla
- (Tajikistan) Dilshod Salomov
- (Tajikistan) Fayzali Sardorov
- (Uzbekistan) Ilkhomjon Khamroev

2 goals

- (Afghanistan) Bahman Gorgage
- (Afghanistan) Hamid Reza Hossaini
- (Iran) Ali Akrami
- (Kyrgyzstan) Mukhamed Askarbekov
- (Kyrgyzstan) Daniyar Talaibekov
- (Tajikistan) Muhamadjon Sharipov
- (Tajikistan) Nekruz Alimakhmadov
- (Turkmenistan) Shiri Bayramdurdyyev
- (Turkmenistan) Maksat Soltanov
- (Turkmenistan) Gylychmyrat Gylychmyradov
- (Uzbekistan) Akbar Usmonov

1 goal

- (Afghanistan) Seyid Hossein Mousavi
- (Afghanistan) Abdul Ghafar Sadeqi
- (Iran) Amirhossein Dehghanibangudi
- (Iran) Asoud Yousef Shavardazi
- (Iran) Behrooz Azimihematabadi
- (Iran) Belal Ismaily Kuraneh
- (Iran) Mahdi Rostami
- (Iran) Mohammadhossein Bazar
- (Iran) Soran Balkaneh
- (Kyrgyzstan) Almazbek Samat Uulu
- (Kyrgyzstan) Bektur Ilyasov
- (Kyrgyzstan) Shohrukh Mahmadaminov
- (Tajikistan) Bakhtiyor Soliev
- (Tajikistan) Nasratsho Ismoilov
- (Tajikistan) Samandar Rizomov
- (Turkmenistan) Gurbangeldi Sahedov
- (Turkmenistan) Mulkaman Annaguliyev
- (Uzbekistan) Dilshod Rakhmatov
- (Uzbekistan) Ikhtiyor Ropiev
- (Uzbekistan) Abdulla Solikhov
- (Uzbekistan) Sunatulla Juraev

1 own goal

- (Tajikistan) Nekruz Idiev (against Turkmenistan)
- (Uzbekistan) Akbar Usmonov (against Iran)

== Awards ==
The following awards were given at the conclusion of the tournament:

Most Valuable player Award
(Iran) Ali Akrami
Top Goalscorer Award
(Uzbekistan) Khusniddin Nishonov
Best Goalkeeper Award
(Iran) Mahdi Rostami
Fair Play Award
Tajikistan
Special Award
Tajikistan ?

== See also ==
- 2023 CAFA Women's Futsal Championship
- 2024 FIFA Futsal World Cup
