= CAFA Futsal Cup =

- Organiser(s): CAFA
- Founded: 2023
- Region: Central Asia
- Teams: 6 (2023)
- Current champions: Iran U23 (1st title)
- Website: Official website

The CAFA Futsal Cup is an international futsal competition in Central Asia for the member nations of the Central Asian Football Association (CAFA).

== History ==
The inaugural edition of the senior men's tournament was hosted by Tajikistan in 2023. In April 2025, it was announced that two European teams, Armenia and Russia, had been invited to the next CAFA Men's Futsal Championship, hosted by Iran.

== Results ==
Edition	Year	Hosts	Champions	Score	Runners-up	Third place	Score and venue	Fourth place	No. of teams
1	2023	Tajikistan	Iran U23	round-robin	Afghanistan	Uzbekistan	round-robin	Tajikistan	6

== Performance by nation ==
Nation	Titles	Runners-up	Third place	Fourth place	Total
Iran	1 (2023)				1
Afghanistan		1 (2023)			1
Uzbekistan			1 (2023)		1
Tajikistan				1 (2023^{*})	1

* = hosts

== Participating nations ==
Legend

- 1st – Champions
- 2nd – Runners-up
- 3rd – Third place
- 4th – Fourth place
- GS – Group stage
- Q – Qualified for the current tournament
- •• — Qualified but withdrew
- • – Did not qualify
- × – Did not enter / Withdrew / Banned
- – Hosts

Nation	(Tajikistan) 2023 (6)	Total
Afghanistan	2nd	1
Iran	1st	1
Kyrgyzstan	6th	1
Tajikistan	4th	1
Turkmenistan	5th	1
Uzbekistan	3rd	1

== Summary ==
As of the 2023 edition

Rank	Team	Part	Pld	W	D	L	GF	GA	GD	Pts
1	Iran	1	5	4	0	1	13	3	10	12
2	Afghanistan	1	5	3	1	1	15	16	–1	10
3	Uzbekistan	1	5	3	0	2	14	12	2	9
4	Tajikistan	1	5	2	1	2	13	12	1	7
5	Turkmenistan	1	5	2	0	3	9	11	–2	6
6	Kyrgyzstan	1	5	0	0	5	7	17	–10	0

== Under-age tournaments ==
=== U-19 men's ===
Year	Host	Final			Third place match			Refs
Year	Host	Champions	Score	Runners-up	3rd place	Score	4th place	Refs
2022	(Kyrgyzstan) Bishkek	Iran	Round-robin	Afghanistan	Kyrgyzstan	Round-robin	Uzbekistan	
