= 2020 AFC Futsal Championship qualification =

Tournament details
- Host countries: Vietnam (ASEAN); Iran (Central & South); China (East); Bahrain (West)
- Dates: 16–27 October 2019
- Teams: 31 (from 1 confederation)

Tournament statistics
- Matches played: 52
- Goals scored: 371 (7.13 per match)
- Attendance: 28,992 (558 per match)
- Top scorer: (Thailand) Muhammad Osamanmusa (7 goals)

The 2020 AFC Futsal Championship qualification was the qualification process organized by the Asian Football Confederation (AFC) to determine the participating teams for the 2020 AFC Futsal Championship, the 16th edition of the international men's futsal championship of Asia.

A total of 16 teams qualified to play in the final tournament, including Turkmenistan who automatically qualified as original hosts (tournament was later relocated to Kuwait before being cancelled).

The qualification process was divided into four zones: ASEAN Zone, where the 2019 AFF Futsal Championship served as the qualifying competition, Central & South Zone (Nepal being the only team from South Zone entering), East Zone, and West Zone.

== Qualification process ==
Of the 47 AFC member associations, a total of 31 teams entered the competition. Based on the teams’ performance of 2018 AFC Futsal Championship, the 16 spots in the final tournament were distributed as follows:

- Host: 1 spot
- ASEAN Zone: 3 spots
- Central & South Zone: 4 spots
- East Zone: 3 spots
- West Zone: 5 spots

=== Draw ===
In each zone, the teams were seeded according to their performance in the 2018 AFC Futsal Championship final tournament and qualification (overall ranking shown in parentheses; NR stands for non-ranked teams).

The draw for the 2019 AFF Futsal Championship, which served as the ASEAN Zone qualifying competition, was held by the AFF in July 2019. The eight teams were drawn into two groups of four teams.

ASEAN Zone
Pot 1	Pot 2	Pot 3	Pot 4
1. **Vietnam** (6); 2. **Thailand** (8)	3. Malaysia (13); 4. Myanmar (15)	5. **Indonesia** (18); 6. Timor-Leste (27)	7. Australia (NR); 8. Cambodia (NR)

The draw for the Central & South Zone, East Zone and West Zone, was held on 25 July 2019, 15:00 MYT (UTC+8), at the AFC House in Kuala Lumpur, Malaysia.

- In the Central & South Zone, the seven teams were drawn into two groups: one group of four teams and one group of three teams. Turkmenistan also entered the qualifying competition despite having automatically qualified for the final tournament.

Central & South Zone
Pot 1	Pot 2	Pot 3
1. **Iran** (1); 2. **Uzbekistan** (3)	3. **Kyrgyzstan** (10); 4. **Tajikistan** (11)	5. **Turkmenistan** (19); 6. Afghanistan (22); 7. Nepal (28)

- In the East Zone, the seven teams were drawn into two groups: one group of four teams and one group of three teams.

East Zone
Pot 1	Pot 2	Pot 3
1. **Japan** (2); 2. Chinese Taipei (9)	3. **China** (12); 4. **South Korea** (16)	5. Hong Kong (21); 6. Macau (23); 7. Mongolia (26)

- In the West Zone, the nine teams were drawn into two groups: one group of five teams and one group of four teams.

West Zone
Pot 1	Pot 2	Pot 3	Pot 4
1. Iraq (4); 2. **Lebanon** (5)	3. **Bahrain** (7)	4. **Saudi Arabia** (17); 5. Qatar (20); 6. United Arab Emirates (25)	7. **Kuwait** (NR); 8. **Oman** (NR); 9. Palestine (NR)

Notes

- Teams in **bold** qualified for the final tournament.

Did not enter
ASEAN Zone	Brunei; Laos; Philippines; Singapore
East Zone	Guam; Northern Mariana Islands; North Korea
South Zone	Bangladesh; Bhutan; India; Maldives; Pakistan; Sri Lanka
West Zone	Jordan; Syria; Yemen

== Format ==
In each group, teams played each other once at a centralised venue.

=== Tiebreakers ===
Teams are ranked according to points (3 points for a win, 1 point for a draw, 0 points for a loss), and if tied on points, the following tiebreaking criteria are applied, in the order given, to determine the rankings (Regulations Article 10.5):

1. Points in head-to-head matches among tied teams;
2. Goal difference in head-to-head matches among tied teams;
3. Goals scored in head-to-head matches among tied teams;
4. If more than two teams are tied, and after applying all head-to-head criteria above, a subset of teams are still tied, all head-to-head criteria above are reapplied exclusively to this subset of teams;
5. Goal difference in all group matches;
6. Goals scored in all group matches;
7. Penalty shoot-out if only two teams are tied and they met in the last round of the group;
8. Disciplinary points (yellow card = 1 point, red card as a result of two yellow cards = 3 points, direct red card = 3 points, yellow card followed by direct red card = 4 points);
9. Drawing of lots.

== ASEAN Zone ==
Top three teams of the tournament qualified for 2020 AFC Futsal Championship.

- The matches were played between 21 and 27 October 2019.
- All matches were held in Vietnam.
- Times listed are UTC+7.

Schedule
Matchday	Dates	Matches
Matchday 1	21 October 2019	1 v 4, 2 v 3
Matchday 2	22 October 2019	4 v 2, 3 v 1
Matchday 3	23 October 2019	1 v 2, 3 v 4
Matchday 4	25 October 2019	Semi-finals
Matchday 5	27 October 2019	Third place match & Final

=== Group A ===
Pos	Team	Pld	W	D	L	GF	GA	GD	Pts	Qualification
1	Thailand	3	3	0	0	33	1	+32	9	Knockout stage
2	Myanmar	3	2	0	1	19	13	+6	6	Knockout stage
3	Timor-Leste	3	0	1	2	6	22	−16	1	
4	Cambodia	3	0	1	2	7	29	−22	1	

Source: AFF AFC
21 October 2019
11:00

Thailand	12–0	Cambodia
Ronnachai 12', 33'; Osamanmusa 13', 21', 21'; Kritsada 30', 31'; Pornmongkol 33', 37', 40'; Jetsada 36'; Watchara 39'	Report

Phú Thọ Indoor Stadium, Ho Chi Minh City
Attendance: 120
Referee: Hawkar Salar Ahmed (Iraq)
21 October 2019
13:30

Myanmar	6–1	Timor-Leste
Khin Zaw Lin 10'; Hlaing Min Tun 20'; Nyein Min Soe 33', 35'; Pyae Phyo Maung I 36'; Kaung Chit Thu 40'	Report	Duarte 14'

Phú Thọ Indoor Stadium, Ho Chi Minh City
Attendance: 82
Referee: Lee Po-fu (Chinese Taipei)

22 October 2019
11:30

Cambodia	3–13	Myanmar
Keo Cheatuo 1', 29'; Orkchan Sereyvong 30'	Report	Nyein Min Soe 6'; Aung Zin Oo 8', 27', 28'; Ko Ko Lwin 13', 24'; Pyae Phyo Maung II 13', 14'; Hlaing Min Tun 21', 40'; Naing Ye Kyaw 26'; Wai Zin Oo 27'; Pyae Phyo Maung I 29'

Phú Thọ Indoor Stadium, Ho Chi Minh City
Attendance: 68
Referee: Abdulrahman Al-Doseri (Bahrain)
22 October 2019
14:00

Timor-Leste	1–12	Thailand
Nunes 14'	Report	Suphawut 6', 18' (pen.); E. Soares 6' (o.g.); Ronnachai 8', 28'; Apiwat 8'; Jetsada 10'; Nattawut 17'; Osamanmusa 20', 30', 40' (pen.); Watchara 22'

Phú Thọ Indoor Stadium, Ho Chi Minh City
Attendance: 100
Referee: Tsubasa Oya (Japan)

23 October 2019
11:30

Thailand	9–0	Myanmar
Warut 16', 25'; Jirawat 21'; Suphawut 23'; Jetsada 27'; Kritsada 32'; Nattawut 34'; Pornmongkol 39'; Watchara 40'	Report

Phú Thọ Indoor Stadium, Ho Chi Minh City
Attendance: 112
Referee: Tamim Hussaini (Afghanistan)
23 October 2019
14:00

Timor-Leste	4–4	Cambodia
Moniz 9', 30'; Ximenes 19'; E. Soares 32'	Report	Duarte 1' (o.g.); Ros Sirotha 2'; Heng Sokly 7'; Orkchan Sereyvong 22'

Phú Thọ Indoor Stadium, Ho Chi Minh City
Attendance: 145
Referee: Eisa Abdulhoussain (Kuwait)

=== Group B ===
Pos	Team	Pld	W	D	L	GF	GA	GD	Pts	Qualification
1	Indonesia	3	2	1	0	11	5	+6	7	Knockout stage
2	Vietnam (H)	3	2	1	0	6	2	+4	7	Knockout stage
3	Australia	3	1	0	2	9	14	−5	3	
4	Malaysia	3	0	0	3	8	13	−5	0	

Source: AFF AFC
(H) Hosts
21 October 2019
16:00

Malaysia	2–3	Indonesia
Ridzwan 27'; Saiful 27'	Report	Kustiawan 17'; Iqbal 17'; Syahidansyah 32'

Phú Thọ Indoor Stadium, Ho Chi Minh City
Attendance: 160
Referee: Fahad Al-Hosani (United Arab Emirates)
21 October 2019
19:00

Vietnam	2–0	Australia
Nguyễn Mạnh Dũng 28'; Nguyễn Minh Trí 37'	Report

Phú Thọ Indoor Stadium, Ho Chi Minh City
Attendance: 1,400
Referee: Takeshi Fujita (Japan)

22 October 2019
16:30

Indonesia	0–0	Vietnam
	Report

Phú Thọ Indoor Stadium, Ho Chi Minh City
Attendance: 1,922
Referee: Ebrahim Mehrabi Afshar (Iran)
22 October 2019
19:00

Australia	6–4	Malaysia
Lynch 1', 14'; W. Giovenali 3'; Cooper 6'; Niski 18'; Basger 38'	Report	G. Giovenali 20' (o.g.); Ridzwan 29', 34', 38'

Phú Thọ Indoor Stadium, Ho Chi Minh City
Attendance: 145
Referee: Khalil Balhawan (Lebanon)

23 October 2019
16:30

Indonesia	8–3	Australia
Ardiansyah N. 4'; Kustiawan 17', 22'; Subhan 25', 34'; Saptaji 33'; Iqbal 39', 40'	Report	Basger 14'; Fogarty 29', 33'

Phú Thọ Indoor Stadium, Ho Chi Minh City
Attendance: 562
Referee: Timur Ramzanov (Turkmenistan)
23 October 2019
19:00

Vietnam	4–2	Malaysia
Nguyễn Thành Tín 6'; Vũ Đức Tùng 24'; Nguyễn Minh Trí 39'; Châu Đoàn Phát 40'	Report	Haniffa 33'; Azwann 37'

Phú Thọ Indoor Stadium, Ho Chi Minh City
Attendance: 1,800
Referee: Takeshi Fujita (Japan)

=== Semi-finals ===
The winners qualified for 2020 AFC Futsal Championship.

25 October 2019
14:00

Thailand	2–0	Vietnam
Ronnachai 26'; Kritsada 26'	Report

Phú Thọ Indoor Stadium, Ho Chi Minh City
Attendance: 1,692
Referee: Lee Po-fu (Chinese Taipei)
25 October 2019
17:00

Indonesia	4–3	Myanmar
Firman 17'; Kustiawan 28'; Subhan 32'; Wossiry 40'	Report	Naing Ye Kyaw 23'; Nyein Min Soe 35'; Pyae Phyo Maung II 40'

Phú Thọ Indoor Stadium, Ho Chi Minh City
Attendance: 384
Referee: Takeshi Fujita (Japan)

=== Third place match ===
The winner qualified for 2020 AFC Futsal Championship.

27 October 2019
14:00

Vietnam	7–3	Myanmar
Trần Thái Huy 6', 6'; Nhận Gia Hưng 27'; Trần Văn Vũ 32', 38'; Phạm Đức Hòa 34'; Nguyễn Minh Trí 39'	Report	Naing Ye Kyaw 9', 33'; Kyaw Soe Moe 16'

Phú Thọ Indoor Stadium, Ho Chi Minh City
Attendance: 1,655
Referee: Hawkar Salar Ahmed (Iraq)

=== Final ===
27 October 2019
17:00

Thailand	5–0	Indonesia
Osamanmusa 10'; Suphawut 17'; Warut 24'; Kritsada 35', 40'	Report

Phú Thọ Indoor Stadium, Ho Chi Minh City
Attendance: 536
Referee: Ebrahim Mehrabi Afshar (Iran)

== Central & South Zone ==
Top two teams of each group qualified for 2020 AFC Futsal Championship. Had Turkmenistan occupied one of the qualifying spots, the best third-placed team from the two groups would also have qualified.

- The matches were played between 23 and 25 October 2019.
- All matches were held in Iran.
- Times listed are UTC+3:30.

Schedule
Matchday	Dates	Matches	
Matchday	Dates	Group A	Group B
Matchday 1	23 October 2019	1 v 4, 2 v 3	3 v 1
Matchday 2	24 October 2019	4 v 2, 3 v 1	2 v 3
Matchday 3	25 October 2019	1 v 2, 3 v 4	1 v 2

=== Group A ===
Pos	Team	Pld	W	D	L	GF	GA	GD	Pts	Qualification
1	Uzbekistan	3	3	0	0	19	6	+13	9	2020 AFC Futsal Championship
2	Tajikistan	3	2	0	1	14	11	+3	6	2020 AFC Futsal Championship
3	Afghanistan	3	1	0	2	10	13	−3	3	
4	Nepal	3	0	0	3	3	16	−13	0	

Source: AFC
Rules for classification: Qualification tiebreakers
23 October 2019
13:00

Tajikistan	6–0	Nepal
Hamidov 6', 24'; Sardorov 15', 24'; Kuziev 17'; Rakhmatov 21'	Report

Ghadir Arena, Urmia
Attendance: 200
Referee: Helday Idang (Malaysia)
23 October 2019
15:30

Uzbekistan	6–2	Afghanistan
Adilov 4'; Kazemi 8' (o.g.); Elibaev 10'; Khamroev 23'; Ropiev 35'; Nishonov 38'	Report	Kazemi 21', 36'

Ghadir Arena, Urmia
Attendance: 523
Referee: Husain Ali Al-Bahhar (Bahrain)

24 October 2019
13:00

Afghanistan	2–5	Tajikistan
Mousavi 12'; Fayazi 15'	Report	Rakhmatov 7'; Hamidov 24'; Salomov 27'; Halimov 30', 39'

Ghadir Arena, Urmia
Attendance: 123
Referee: Yuttakon Maiket (Thailand)
24 October 2019
15:30

Nepal	1–4	Uzbekistan
M. Lama 39'	Report	Nishonov 3', 15'; Usmonov 13'; Adilov 21'

Ghadir Arena, Urmia
Attendance: 343
Referee: Jo Young-ha (South Korea)

25 October 2019
13:00

Nepal	2–6	Afghanistan
Hamid 6'; M. Lama 16'	Report	Rezayi 2'; Mousavi 12', 40'; Kazemi 17'; Hashemi 27'; Mahmoodi 36'

Ghadir Arena, Urmia
Attendance: 105
Referee: Wahyu Wicaksono (Indonesia)
25 October 2019
15:30

Uzbekistan	9–3	Tajikistan
Usmonov 8', 17'; Nishonov 15'; Rakhmatov 18'; Choriev 20', 26', 28'; Erkinov 25'; Shavkatov 29'	Report	Khojaev 1', 4'; R. Sharipov 31'

Ghadir Arena, Urmia
Attendance: 1,106
Referee: Trương Quốc Dũng (Vietnam)

=== Group B ===
Pos	Team	Pld	W	D	L	GF	GA	GD	Pts	Qualification
1	Iran (H)	2	2	0	0	12	3	+9	6	2020 AFC Futsal Championship
2	Kyrgyzstan	2	1	0	1	6	10	−4	3	2020 AFC Futsal Championship
3	Turkmenistan (Note: Turkmenistan, as original final tournament hosts, automatically qualified regardless of qualification results.)	2	0	0	2	2	7	−5	0	2020 AFC Futsal Championship

Source: AFC
Rules for classification: Qualification tiebreakers
(H) Hosts
Notes:
23 October 2019
18:00

Turkmenistan	0–4	Iran
	Report	Hassanzadeh 3'; Javid 18'; Sähedow 27' (o.g.); Karimi 34'

Ghadir Arena, Urmia
Attendance: 3,590
Referee: Mohamad Chami (Lebanon)

24 October 2019
18:00

Kyrgyzstan	3–2	Turkmenistan
Tursunov 28', 39'; Salimbaev 37'	Report	Sähedow 17' (pen.); Annagulyýew 22'

Ghadir Arena, Urmia
Referee: Osama Saeed Idrees Sedaif (Bahrain)

25 October 2019
18:00

Iran	8–3	Kyrgyzstan
Ahmadi 2'; Hassanzadeh 7'; Karimi 10', 32'; Javid 13', 18', 39'; Nematian 15'	Report	Makhmadaminov 6'; Alimov 11'; Abdyldaev 19'

Ghadir Arena, Urmia
Attendance: 5,004
Referee: Kim Jong-hee (South Korea)

== East Zone ==
Winners of each group, and the winner of the play-off between the group runners-up, qualified for 2020 AFC Futsal Championship.

- The matches were played between 22 and 26 October 2019.
- All matches were held in China.
- Times listed are UTC+8.

Schedule
Matchday	Dates	Matches	
Matchday	Dates	Group A	Group B
Matchday 1	22 October 2019	1 v 4, 2 v 3	3 v 1
Matchday 2	23 October 2019	4 v 2, 3 v 1	2 v 3
Matchday 3	24 October 2019	1 v 2, 3 v 4	1 v 2
Matchday 4	26 October 2019	Play-off	

=== Group A ===
Pos	Team	Pld	W	D	L	GF	GA	GD	Pts	Qualification
1	China (H)	3	3	0	0	16	2	+14	9	2020 AFC Futsal Championship
2	Mongolia	3	1	1	1	10	10	0	4	Play-off
3	Chinese Taipei	3	1	1	1	10	13	−3	4	
4	Hong Kong	3	0	0	3	4	15	−11	0	

Source: AFC
Rules for classification: Qualification tiebreakers
(H) Hosts
22 October 2019
15:30

China	3–0	Mongolia
Xu Yang 29', 36'; Li Shunying 35'	Report

Ordos Sports Centre, Ordos
Attendance: 1,000
Referee: Vahid Arzpeyma Mohammreh (Iran)
22 October 2019
18:00

Chinese Taipei	4–1	Hong Kong
Chang Chien-ying 4', 31'; Huang Po-chun 11'; Chi Sheng-fa 19'	Report	Li Ka Chun 13'

Ordos Sports Centre, Ordos
Attendance: 70
Referee: Benjapol Mucharoensap (Thailand)

23 October 2019
15:30

Hong Kong	0–5	China
	Report	Xu Yang 16'; Wang Jiahao 19'; Deng Tao 25'; Shen Siming 32'; Geng Deyang 36'

Ordos Sports Centre, Ordos
Attendance: 1,400
Referee: Azat Hajypolatov (Turkmenistan)
23 October 2019
18:00

Mongolia	4–4	Chinese Taipei
Yalalt 16'; Pagamsuren 33'; Tumurbaatar 33'; Battulga 40'	Report	Huang Po-chun 11'; Tang Wei-tai 18'; Chi Sheng-fa 19'; Fu Li-wei 30'

Ordos Sports Centre, Ordos
Attendance: 100
Referee: Pornnarong Grairod (Thailand)

24 October 2019
15:30

Mongolia	6–3	Hong Kong
Pagamsuren 12'; P. Erdenebat 14', 27'; Li Ka Chun 18' (o.g.); Leung Chong Yip 27' (o.g.); Mandakh 40'	Report	Wong Chin Hung 21'; Liu Yik Shing 29'; Chow Ka Wa 40'

Ordos Sports Centre, Ordos
Attendance: 100
Referee: Ali Hafizi (Iran)
24 October 2019
18:00

Chinese Taipei	2–8	China
Chi Sheng-fa 28'; Chu Chia-wei 40'	Report	Xu Yang 10', 16', 18'; Li Jianjia 12'; Chang Chien-ying 17' (o.g.); Geng Deyang 18'; Wang Jiahao 21'; Chen Zhiheng 37'

Ordos Sports Centre, Ordos
Attendance: 1,700
Referee: Anatoliy Rubakov (Uzbekistan)

=== Group B ===
Pos	Team	Pld	W	D	L	GF	GA	GD	Pts	Qualification
1	Japan	2	2	0	0	21	4	+17	6	2020 AFC Futsal Championship
2	South Korea	2	1	0	1	8	5	+3	3	Play-off
3	Macau	2	0	0	2	3	23	−20	0	

Source: AFC
Rules for classification: Qualification tiebreakers
22 October 2019
13:00

Macau	2–17	Japan
Ho Wai Tong 7'; Fong Chi Wa 22'	Report	Hoshi 2', 10'; Yoshikawa 3', 21', 35'; Murota 6', 15', 29'; Kato 6', 14', 26'; Morimura 7'; Ando 11'; Shimizu 14'; Nishitani 22'; Morioka 26'; Nibuya 36'

Ordos Sports Centre, Ordos
Attendance: 100
Referee: Nurdin Bukuev (Kyrgyzstan)

23 October 2019
13:00

South Korea	6–1	Macau
Kim Min-kuk 1'; Lee Min-yong 22' (pen.), 31'; Cho Byung-geol 34'; Park Jeong-jin 35'; Lee Doo-yong 38'	Report	Fong Chi Wa 11'

Ordos Sports Centre, Ordos
Attendance: 100
Referee: Hasan Mousa Al-Gburi (Iraq)

24 October 2019
13:00

Japan	4–2	South Korea
Murota 7'; Kato 22', 26', 32' (pen.)	Report	Lee Min-yong 10' (pen.), 39' (pen.)

Ordos Sports Centre, Ordos
Attendance: 200
Referee: Abdallah Ghaith (Lebanon)

=== Play-off ===
The winner qualified for 2020 AFC Futsal Championship.

26 October 2019
18:00

Mongolia	0–5	South Korea
	Report	Kim Min-kuk 7', 26'; Park Han-ul 8'; Seo Won-geon 17'; Park Jeong-jin 27'

Ordos Sports Centre, Ordos
Attendance: 400
Referee: Rey Ritaga (Philippines)

== West Zone ==
Top two teams of each group, and the winner of the play-off between the group third-placed team, qualified for 2020 AFC Futsal Championship.

- The matches were played between 16 and 22 October 2019.
- All matches were held in Bahrain.
- Times listed are UTC+3.

Schedule
Matchday	Dates	Matches	
Matchday	Dates	Group A	Group B
Matchday 1	16 October 2019	3 v 2, 5 v 4	1 v 4, 2 v 3
Matchday 2	17 October 2019	4 v 1, 5 v 3	—
Matchday 3	18 October 2019	1 v 5, 2 v 4	4 v 2, 3 v 1
Matchday 4	19 October 2019	2 v 5, 3 v 1	—
Matchday 5	20 October 2019	4 v 3, 1 v 2	1 v 2, 3 v 4
Matchday 6	22 October 2019	Play-off	

=== Group A ===
Pos	Team	Pld	W	D	L	GF	GA	GD	Pts	Qualification
1	Kuwait	4	3	0	1	15	5	+10	9	2020 AFC Futsal Championship
2	Bahrain (H)	4	2	1	1	10	6	+4	7	2020 AFC Futsal Championship
3	United Arab Emirates	4	2	1	1	12	13	−1	7	Play-off
4	Iraq	4	2	0	2	11	11	0	6	
5	Palestine	4	0	0	4	9	22	−13	0	

Source: AFC
Rules for classification: Qualification tiebreakers
(H) Hosts
16 October 2019
17:00

Kuwait	7–1	Palestine
Al-Wadi 2', 5', 23'; Hamed 26' (o.g.); Al-Khalifah 27'; Al-Alban 27'; Al-Tawail 33'	Report	Khwailed 26'

Khalifa Sports City Arena, Isa Town
Attendance: 200
Referee: Mahmoudreza Nasirloo (Iran)
16 October 2019
19:00

United Arab Emirates	3–3	Bahrain
Al-Hosani 18' (pen.); Jamil 31'; Al-Dhanhani 31'	Report	Al-Sandi 8', 22'; Abdulnabi 25'

Khalifa Sports City Arena, Isa Town
Attendance: 100
Referee: Tomohiro Kozaki (Japan)

17 October 2019
17:00

Palestine	3–6	Iraq
Shawahna 4', 24'; Hamada 28'	Report	Zeyad 11'; Khalid 22', 23', 37'; Riyadh 28', 31'

Khalifa Sports City Arena, Isa Town
Attendance: 20
Referee: Trương Quốc Dũng (Vietnam)
17 October 2019
19:00

Kuwait	4–1	United Arab Emirates
Al-Wadi 3'; Al-Basam 17'; Al-Tawail 30'; Al-Farsi 35'	Report	T. Abdulla 16'

Khalifa Sports City Arena, Isa Town
Attendance: 200
Referee: Yuttakon Maiket (Thailand)

18 October 2019
17:00

Iraq	1–4	Kuwait
Methaq 27'	Report	Al-Khalifah 11'; Al-Mosabehi 11'; Al-Farsi 28'; Al-Tawail 29'

Khalifa Sports City Arena, Isa Town
Attendance: 200
Referee: Andrew Best (Australia)
18 October 2019
19:00

Bahrain	4–1	Palestine
Al-Sandi 12'; Ahmed 20'; Abdulnabi 33'; Al-Malki 33'	Report	Shawahna 15'

Khalifa Sports City Arena, Isa Town
Attendance: 200
Referee: Jargalsaikhan Rentsenkhand (Mongolia)

19 October 2019
17:00

United Arab Emirates	3–2	Iraq
Khalil 12'; Al-Hosani 20'; Jamil 33'	Report	Khalid 3'; Faisal 15'

Khalifa Sports City Arena, Isa Town
Attendance: 50
Referee: Anatoliy Rubakov (Uzbekistan)
19 October 2019
19:00

Bahrain	2–0	Kuwait
Abdulnabi 9'; Maula 35'	Report

Khalifa Sports City Arena, Isa Town
Attendance: 400
Referee: Azat Hajypolatov (Turkmenistan)

20 October 2019
17:00

Palestine	4–5	United Arab Emirates
Mohammed 17'; Shawahna 19'; Salloum 20', 34'	Report	Juma 11'; Al-Katheeri 21'; M. Obaid 32'; Hussain 38'; Jamil 39'

Khalifa Sports City Arena, Isa Town
Attendance: 40
Referee: Trương Quốc Dũng (Vietnam)
20 October 2019
19:00

Iraq	2–1	Bahrain
Khalid 13'; Methaq 37'	Report	Al-Naar 18'

Khalifa Sports City Arena, Isa Town
Attendance: 200
Referee: Jargalsaikhan Rentsenkhand (Mongolia)

=== Group B ===
Pos	Team	Pld	W	D	L	GF	GA	GD	Pts	Qualification
1	Lebanon	3	3	0	0	20	4	+16	9	2020 AFC Futsal Championship
2	Saudi Arabia	3	1	1	1	10	8	+2	4	2020 AFC Futsal Championship
3	Oman	3	1	1	1	9	14	−5	4	Play-off
4	Qatar	3	0	0	3	3	16	−13	0	

Source: AFC
Rules for classification: Qualification tiebreakers
16 October 2019
13:00

Lebanon	10–2	Oman
Kobeissy 1'; Abou Zeid 3', 14', 25', 34'; El-Homsi 7'; Tneich 9'; Koukezian 11'; El-Khoury 37', 38'	Report	Al-Maawali 17'; Al-Shamsi 35' (pen.)

Khalifa Sports City Arena, Isa Town
Attendance: 50
Referee: An Ran (China)
16 October 2019
15:00

Qatar	2–5	Saudi Arabia
An. Al-Yafei 17'; Al-Awlaqi 24'	Report	Jmah 4'; Mubarak 6', 37'; Al-Otaibi 18', 19'

Khalifa Sports City Arena, Isa Town
Attendance: 20
Referee: Anatoliy Rubakov (Uzbekistan)

18 October 2019
13:00

Oman	3–0	Qatar
Al-Shamsi 5'; Z. Al-Balushi 13'; S. Al-Balushi 40'	Report

Khalifa Sports City Arena, Isa Town
Attendance: 25
Referee: Leung Chung Yin (Hong Kong)
18 October 2019
15:00

Saudi Arabia	1–2	Lebanon
Al-Otaibi 28'	Report	Abou Zeid 6'; Tneich 23'

Khalifa Sports City Arena, Isa Town
Attendance: 150
Referee: Liu Jianqiao (China)

20 October 2019
13:00

Lebanon	8–1	Qatar
Tneich 11' (pen.), 13', 35'; Kheir El-Dine 20'; Zeitoun 21'; Koukezian 30'; Selwan 30'; El-Khoury 34'	Report	Al-Mosallam 23'

Khalifa Sports City Arena, Isa Town
Attendance: 20
Referee: Mahmoudreza Nasirloo (Iran)
20 October 2019
15:00

Saudi Arabia	4–4	Oman
Al-Otaibi 13'; Jmah 21', 21'; Fqihe 27'	Report	Al-Shibli 18', 33'; Al-Shamsi 38'; I. Al-Balushi 39'

Khalifa Sports City Arena, Isa Town
Attendance: 20
Referee: Tomohiro Kozaki (Japan)

=== Play-off ===
The winner qualified for 2020 AFC Futsal Championship.

22 October 2019
18:00

United Arab Emirates	1–5	Oman
T. Abdulla 40'	Report	Al-Shibli 27'; Al-Shamsi 32'; Al-Wahaibi 34', 35'; Al-Maawali 37'

Khalifa Sports City Arena, Isa Town
Attendance: 50
Referee: Leung Chung Yin (Hong Kong)

== Qualified teams ==
The following 16 teams qualified for the final tournament.

Team	Qualified as	Qualified on	Previous appearances in AFC Futsal Championship^{1}
Turkmenistan	Original hosts	15 April 2019	6 (2005, 2006, 2007, 2008, 2010, 2012)
Thailand	ASEAN Zone winners	25 October 2019	15 (1999, 2000, 2001, 2002, 2003, 2004, 2005, 2006, 2007, 2008, 2010, 2012, 2014, 2016, 2018)
Indonesia	ASEAN Zone runners-up	25 October 2019	9 (2002, 2003, 2004, 2005, 2006, 2008, 2010, 2012, 2014)
Vietnam	ASEAN Zone third place	27 October 2019	5 (2005, 2010, 2014, 2016, 2018)
Uzbekistan	Central & South Zone Group A winners	24 October 2019	15 (1999, 2000, 2001, 2002, 2003, 2004, 2005, 2006, 2007, 2008, 2010, 2012, 2014, 2016, 2018)
Tajikistan	Central & South Zone Group A runners-up	24 October 2019	10 (2001, 2005, 2006, 2007, 2008, 2010, 2012, 2014, 2016, 2018)
Iran	Central & South Zone Group B winners	24 October 2019	15 (**1999**, **2000**, **2001**, **2002**, **2003**, **2004**, **2005**, 2006, **2007**, **2008**, **2010**, 2012, 2014, **2016**, **2018**)
Kyrgyzstan	Central & South Zone Group B runners-up	24 October 2019	15 (1999, 2000, 2001, 2002, 2003, 2004, 2005, 2006, 2007, 2008, 2010, 2012, 2014, 2016, 2018)
China	East Zone Group A winners	24 October 2019	12 (2002, 2003, 2004, 2005, 2006, 2007, 2008, 2010, 2012, 2014, 2016, 2018)
Japan	East Zone Group B winners	24 October 2019	15 (1999, 2000, 2001, 2002, 2003, 2004, 2005, **2006**, 2007, 2008, 2010, **2012**, **2014**, 2016, 2018)
South Korea	East Zone Play-off winners	26 October 2019	13 (1999, 2000, 2001, 2002, 2003, 2004, 2005, 2007, 2008, 2010, 2012, 2014, 2018)
Kuwait	West Zone Group A winners	18 October 2019	11 (2001, 2002, 2003, 2004, 2005, 2006, 2007, 2008, 2010, 2012, 2014)
Bahrain	West Zone Group A runners-up	20 October 2019	2 (2002, 2018)
Lebanon	West Zone Group B winners	18 October 2019	11 (2003, 2004, 2005, 2006, 2007, 2008, 2010, 2012, 2014, 2016, 2018)
Saudi Arabia	West Zone Group B runners-up	20 October 2019	1 (2016)
Oman	West Zone Play-off winners	22 October 2019	0 (debut)

^{1} Bold indicates champions for that year. Italic indicates hosts for that year.

== Goalscorers ==
There were 371 goals scored in 52 matches, for an average of 7.13 goals per match.

7 goals

- (Thailand) Muhammad Osamanmusa

6 goals

- (China) Xu Yang
- (Japan) Minami Kato
- (Thailand) Kritsada Wongkaeo

5 goals

- (Iraq) Waleed Khalid
- (Lebanon) Karim Abou Zeid
- (Lebanon) Ali Tneich
- (Thailand) Ronnachai Jungwongsuk

4 goals

- (Indonesia) Andri Kustiawan
- (Iran) Mahdi Javid
- (Japan) Yuki Murota
- (Kuwait) Abdulrahman Al-Wadi
- (Malaysia) Ridzwan Bakri
- (Myanmar) Naing Ye Kyaw
- (Myanmar) Nyein Min Soe
- (Oman) Muatasim Al-Shamsi
- (Palestine) Rashid Shawahna
- (Saudi Arabia) Abdullah Al-Otaibi
- (South Korea) Lee Min-yong
- (Thailand) Pornmongkol Srisubseang
- (Thailand) Suphawut Thueanklang
- (Uzbekistan) Khusniddin Nishonov

3 goals

- (Afghanistan) Akbar Kazemi
- (Afghanistan) Seyed Mousavi
- (Bahrain) Ahmed Abdulnabi
- (Bahrain) Mohamed Al-Sandi
- (Chinese Taipei) Chi Sheng-fa
- (Indonesia) Iqbal Rahmatullah
- (Indonesia) Subhan Faidasa
- (Iran) Mahdi Karimi
- (Japan) Tomoki Yoshikawa
- (Kuwait) Abdulrahman Al-Tawail
- (Lebanon) Georgio El-Khoury
- (Myanmar) Aung Zin Oo
- (Myanmar) Hlaing Min Tun
- (Myanmar) Pyae Phyo Maung II
- (Oman) Muhannad Al-Shibli
- (Saudi Arabia) Jwher Jmah
- (South Korea) Kim Min-kuk
- (Tajikistan) Rustam Hamidov
- (Thailand) Jetsada Chudech
- (Thailand) Watchara Laisri
- (Thailand) Warut Wangsama-aeo
- (United Arab Emirates) Abdulkarim Jamil
- (Uzbekistan) Davron Choriev
- (Uzbekistan) Akbar Usmonov
- (Vietnam) Nguyễn Minh Trí

2 goals

- (Australia) Jarrod Basger
- (Australia) Daniel Fogarty
- (Australia) Grant Lynch
- (Cambodia) Keo Cheatuo
- (Cambodia) Orkchan Sereyvong
- (China) Geng Deyang
- (China) Wang Jiahao
- (Chinese Taipei) Chang Chien-ying
- (Chinese Taipei) Huang Po-chun
- (Iran) Ali Asghar Hassanzadeh
- (Iraq) Fahad Methaq
- (Iraq) Ghaith Riyadh
- (Japan) Shota Hoshi
- (Kuwait) Ahmad Al-Farsi
- (Kuwait) Yousef Al-Khalifah
- (Kyrgyzstan) Arstanbek Tursunov
- (Lebanon) Steve Koukezian
- (Macau) Fong Chi Wa
- (Mongolia) Purevdorj Erdenebat
- (Mongolia) Altantulga Pagamsuren
- (Myanmar) Ko Ko Lwin
- (Myanmar) Pyae Phyo Maung I
- (Nepal) Mani Lama
- (Oman) Khalfan Al-Maawali
- (Oman) Loay Al-Wahaibi
- (Palestine) Adnan Salloum
- (Saudi Arabia) Aroan Mubarak
- (South Korea) Park Jeong-jin
- (Tajikistan) Shavqat Halimov
- (Tajikistan) Bahodur Khojaev
- (Tajikistan) Parviz Rakhmatov
- (Tajikistan) Fayzali Sardorov
- (Thailand) Nattawut Madyalan
- (Timor-Leste) Mario Moniz
- (United Arab Emirates) Tariq Abdulla
- (United Arab Emirates) Abdalla Al-Hosani
- (Uzbekistan) Mashrab Adilov
- (Vietnam) Trần Thái Huy
- (Vietnam) Trần Văn Vũ

1 goal

- (Afghanistan) Mohammad Ali Fayazi
- (Afghanistan) Sayed Hashemi
- (Afghanistan) Farzad Mahmoodi
- (Afghanistan) Mohsen Rezayi
- (Australia) Adam Cooper
- (Australia) Wade Giovenali
- (Australia) Nathan Niski
- (Bahrain) Saleh Ahmed
- (Bahrain) Ali Al-Malki
- (Bahrain) Salman Maula
- (Bahrain) Talal Al-Naar
- (Cambodia) Heng Sokly
- (Cambodia) Ros Sirotha
- (China) Chen Zhiheng
- (China) Deng Tao
- (China) Li Jianjia
- (China) Li Shunying
- (China) Shen Siming
- (Chinese Taipei) Chu Chia-wei
- (Chinese Taipei) Fu Li-wei
- (Chinese Taipei) Tang Wei-tai
- (Hong Kong) Chow Ka Wa
- (Hong Kong) Li Ka Chun
- (Hong Kong) Liu Yik Shing
- (Hong Kong) Wong Chin Hung
- (Indonesia) Ardiansyah Nur
- (Indonesia) Firman Adriansyah
- (Indonesia) Syahidansyah Lubis
- (Indonesia) Bayu Saptaji
- (Indonesia) Marvin Wossiry
- (Iran) Hamid Ahmadi
- (Iran) Taha Nematian
- (Iraq) Salim Faisal
- (Iraq) Tareq Zeyad
- (Japan) Ryohei Ando
- (Japan) Takashi Morimura
- (Japan) Kaoru Morioka
- (Japan) Kazuhiro Nibuya
- (Japan) Ryosuke Nishitani
- (Japan) Kazuya Shimizu
- (Kuwait) Naser Al-Alban
- (Kuwait) Abdulaziz Al-Basam
- (Kuwait) Abdulrahman Al-Mosabehi
- (Kyrgyzstan) Nursultan Abdyldaev
- (Kyrgyzstan) Maksat Alimov
- (Kyrgyzstan) Shokhrukh Makhmadaminov
- (Kyrgyzstan) Iuldashbai Salimbaev
- (Lebanon) Ahmad Kheir El-Dine
- (Lebanon) Ali El-Homsi
- (Lebanon) Mohamad Kobeissy
- (Lebanon) Jamal Selwan
- (Lebanon) Hassan Zeitoun
- (Macau) Ho Wai Tong
- (Malaysia) Azwann Ismail
- (Malaysia) Haniffa Hasan
- (Malaysia) Saiful Nizam
- (Mongolia) Batbaatar Battulga
- (Mongolia) Chantsal Mandakh
- (Mongolia) Ankhbayar Tumurbaatar
- (Mongolia) Altansukh Yalalt
- (Myanmar) Kaung Chit Thu
- (Myanmar) Khin Zaw Lin
- (Myanmar) Kyaw Soe Moe
- (Myanmar) Wai Zin Oo
- (Nepal) Aadil Hamid
- (Oman) Issa Al-Balushi
- (Oman) Samer Al-Balushi
- (Oman) Zamel Al-Balushi
- (Palestine) Mohammad Hamada
- (Palestine) Adham Khwailed
- (Palestine) Ahmed Mohammed
- (Qatar) Tamim Al-Awlaqi
- (Qatar) Saif Al-Mosallam
- (Qatar) Abdulrahman Al-Yafei
- (Saudi Arabia) Mohsen Fqihe
- (South Korea) Cho Byung-geol
- (South Korea) Lee Doo-yong
- (South Korea) Park Han-ul
- (South Korea) Seo Won-geon
- (Tajikistan) Umed Kuziev
- (Tajikistan) Dilshod Salomov
- (Tajikistan) Rahmonali Sharipov
- (Thailand) Apiwat Chaemcharoen
- (Thailand) Jirawat Sornwichian
- (Timor-Leste) Remigio Duarte
- (Timor-Leste) Ilidio Nunes
- (Timor-Leste) Eufrasio Soares
- (Timor-Leste) Bendito Ximenes
- (Turkmenistan) Mülkaman Annagulyýew
- (Turkmenistan) Gurbangeldi Sähedow
- (United Arab Emirates) Wael Al-Dhanhani
- (United Arab Emirates) Ahmad Hussain
- (United Arab Emirates) Abdulla Juma
- (United Arab Emirates) Hamdan Al-Katheeri
- (United Arab Emirates) Ahmed Khalil
- (United Arab Emirates) Mohammed Obaid
- (Uzbekistan) Ravshan Elibaev
- (Uzbekistan) Khushnur Erkinov
- (Uzbekistan) Ilkhomjon Khamroev
- (Uzbekistan) Dilshod Rakhmatov
- (Uzbekistan) Ikhtiyor Ropiev
- (Uzbekistan) Dilmurod Shavkatov
- (Vietnam) Nguyễn Mạnh Dũng
- (Vietnam) Châu Đoàn Phát
- (Vietnam) Nguyễn Thành Tín
- (Vietnam) Nhận Gia Hưng
- (Vietnam) Phạm Đức Hòa
- (Vietnam) Vũ Đức Tùng

1 own goal

- (Afghanistan) Akbar Kazemi (against Uzbekistan)
- (Australia) Gregory Giovenali (against Malaysia)
- (Chinese Taipei) Chang Chien-ying (against China)
- (Hong Kong) Leung Chong Yip (against Mongolia)
- (Hong Kong) Li Ka Chun (against Mongolia)
- (Palestine) Husam Hamed (against Kuwait)
- (Timor-Leste) Remigio Duarte (against Cambodia)
- (Timor-Leste) Eufrasio Soares (against Thailand)
- (Turkmenistan) Gurbangeldi Sähedow (against Iran)
