= 2022 WAFF Futsal Championship =

بطولة اتحاد غرب آسيا لكرة الصالات 2022

Tournament details
- Host country: Kuwait
- City: Kuwait City
- Dates: 4–13 June
- Teams: 8 (from 1 sub-confederation)
- Venue(s): 1 (in 1 host city)

Final positions
- Champions: Kuwait (1st title)
- Runners-up: Saudi Arabia

Tournament statistics
- Matches played: 15
- Goals scored: 91 (6.07 per match)
- Top scorer(s): (Kuwait) Saleh AlFadhel (Saudi Arabia) Abdulilah AlOtaibi (5 goals each)
- Best player(s): (Saudi Arabia) Fahad Rudayni
- Best goalkeeper: (Kuwait) Mohammad AlHuzaim

The 2022 WAFF Futsal Championship (Arabic: بطولة اتحاد غرب آسيا لكرة الصالات 2022) was the fourth edition of the WAFF Futsal Championship. It was held in Kuwait City, Kuwait.

== Teams ==
Eight teams entered the tournament. Jordan, Qatar, Syria, Yemen won't participate.

Team	Appearance	Last appearance	Previous best performance
Bahrain	2nd	2009	Fourth place (2009)
Iraq	4th	2012	Champions (2009)
Kuwait	2nd	2012	Fourth place (2012)
Lebanon	3rd	2009	Runners-up (2007)
Oman	1st	—	Debut
Saudi Arabia	1st	—	Debut
Palestine	2nd	2012	Fifth place (2012)
United Arab Emirates	1st	—	Debut

== Referees ==
- (Bahrain) Husain Al Bahhar
- (Iraq) Rawand Rashid Shwan
- (Kuwait) Eisa Abdulhoussain
- (Lebanon) Khalil Balhawan
- (United Arab Emirates) Ahmed Al Ghais

== Group stage ==
=== Group A ===
Pos	Team	Pld	W	D	L	GF	GA	GD	Pts	Qualification
1	Kuwait (H)	3	2	1	0	12	7	+5	7	Knockout stage
2	Saudi Arabia	3	2	0	1	9	8	+1	6	Knockout stage
3	Iraq	3	1	1	1	10	9	+1	4	
4	Palestine	3	0	0	3	6	13	−7	0	

Source: WAFF
Rules for classification: Tiebreakers
(H) Hosts
4 June 2022
16:00

Palestine	1–2	Saudi Arabia
Shawahna 22'	Report; Pre-match Report	AlOtaibi 19'; Rudayni 39'

Al Naser Sporting Club
Referee: Khalil Balhawan (Lebanon)
4 June 2022
19:30

Kuwait	2–2	Iraq
AlKhalifah 12'; AlFadhel 15'	Report; Pre-match Report	AlMosabehi 9' (o.g.); Ismail 28'

Al Naser Sporting Club
Referee: Husain Al Bahhar (Bahrain)

6 June 2022
16:00

Iraq	6–4	Palestine
Drewil 28'; Fahem 29', 36'; Zirej 37'; Arab 38'; Ahmed 40'	Report; Pre-match Report	Khwailed 12', 25', 39'; Salloum 32'

Al Naser Sporting Club
Referee: Khalil Balhawan (Lebanon)
6 June 2022
19:30

Saudi Arabia	4–5	Kuwait
AlOtaibi 4', 7'; Rudayni 29'; AlMulla 33'	Report; Pre-match Report	AlBasam 5'; AlMosabehi 8', 14'; AlTawail 16'; AlFadhel 39'

Al Naser Sporting Club
Referee: Ahmed Al Ghais (United Arab Emirates)

8 June 2022
16:00

Kuwait	5–1	Palestine
AlBasam 13'; AlMosabehi 19'; Hayat 21'; AlFadhel 25'; AlBaeijan 30'	Report; Pre-match Report	Harara 20'

Al Naser Sporting Club
Referee: Ahmed Al Ghais (United Arab Emirates)
8 June 2022
19:30

Saudi Arabia	3–2	Iraq
AlOtaibi 29', 39'; AlQarni 39'	Report	Fahem 20'; Fqihe 32' (o.g.)

Al Naser Sporting Club

=== Group B ===
Pos	Team	Pld	W	D	L	GF	GA	GD	Pts	Qualification
1	Oman	3	1	2	0	9	7	+2	5 (Note: Goals scored in matches between tied teams: Oman 5, Lebanon 4, Bahrain 3)	Knockout stage
2	Lebanon	3	1	2	0	6	5	+1	5	Knockout stage
3	Bahrain	3	1	2	0	10	5	+5	5	
4	United Arab Emirates	3	0	0	3	5	13	−8	0	

Source: WAFF
Rules for classification: Tiebreakers
Notes:
5 June 2022
16:00

Lebanon	1–1	Bahrain
Zeitoun 39'	Report; Pre-match Report	Yusuf 32'

Al Naser Sporting Club
Referee: Eisa Abdulhoussain (Kuwait)
5 June 2022
19:30

Oman	4–2	United Arab Emirates
Alshamsi 12'; I. Albalushi 23'; S. Albalushi 29'; Allawati 32'	Report; Pre-match Report	Alfalasi 20'; Buzebar 40'

Al Naser Sporting Club
Referee: Rawand Rashid Shwan (Iraq)

7 June 2022
16:00

United Arab Emirates	1–2	Lebanon
Alblooshi 28'	Report; Pre-match Report	Kheir El Dine 33'; Hachem 34'

Al Naser Sporting Club
Referee: Eisa Abdulhoussain (Kuwait)
7 June 2022
19:30

Bahrain	2–2	Oman
Ali 4'; Anan 13'	Report; Pre-match Report	Alshamsi 7', 15'

Al Naser Sporting Club
Referee: Saad AlHayyan (Saudi Arabia)

9 June 2022
16:00

Bahrain	7–2	United Arab Emirates
Amheiri 6' (o.g.); Sanjar 10'; Muhammad 11', 17'; Antar 12'; Abbas 19'; Ali 23'	Report; Pre-match Report	Ali 23'; Alfalasi 31'

Al Naser Sporting Club
Referee: Eisa Abdulhoussain (Kuwait)
9 June 2022
19:30

Oman	3–3	Lebanon
Z. Albalushi 14'; Alshibli 18'; S. Albalushi 30'	Report	Hachem 17'; Zeitoun 20'; Kheir El Dine 29'

Al Naser Sporting Club

== Knockout stage ==
=== Bracket ===
Semi-finals
11 June
Kuwait	6
Lebanon	3
11 June
Oman	3
Saudi Arabia	4

Final
13 June
Kuwait	5
Saudi Arabia	3

=== Semi-finals ===
11 June 2022
16:00

Kuwait	6–3	Lebanon
AlTawail 1'; AlKhalifah 8', 34'; Hayat 19'; AlFadhel 22'; AlAwadhi 38'	Report; Pre-match Report	Rhyem 11', 36', 39'

Al Naser Sporting Club
Referee: Husain Al Bahhar (Bahrain)
11 June 2022
19:30

Oman	3–4	Saudi Arabia
Z. Albalushi 17'; Allawati 19', 28'	Report; Pre-match Report	Fqihe 8', 16'; AlMaghrabi 24', 29'

Al Naser Sporting Club

=== Final ===
13 June 2022
18:00

Kuwait	5–3	Saudi Arabia
AlFadhel 3'; AlMosabehi 7'; AlKhalifah 27'; AlAbasi 32'; AlTawail 36'	Report; Pre-match Report	AlMaghrabi 4'; AlAsiri 19'; AlQarni 24'

Al Naser Sporting Club
Referee: Khalil Balhawan (Lebanon)

== Goalscorers ==
There were 91 goals scored in 15 matches, for an average of 6.07 goals per match.

5 goals

- (Kuwait) Saleh AlFadhel
- (Saudi Arabia) Abdulilah AlOtaibi

4 goals

- (Kuwait) Abdulrahman AlMosabehi
- (Kuwait) Yousef AlKhalifah

3 goals

- (Iraq) Waleed Fahem
- (Lebanon) Mustafa Rhyem
- (Kuwait) Abdulrahman AlTawail
- (Oman) Muatasim Alshamsi
- (Oman) Mohammed Allawati
- (Palestine) Adham Khwailed
- (Saudi Arabia) Abdullah AlMaghrabi

2 goals

- (Bahrain) Ammar Ali
- (Bahrain) Salman Muhammad
- (Kuwait) Abdulaziz AlBasam
- (Kuwait) Hamad Hayat
- (Lebanon) Ali Hachem
- (Lebanon) Ahmad Kheir El Dine
- (Lebanon) Hassan Zeitoun
- (Oman) Samer Albalushi
- (Oman) Zamel Albalushi
- (Saudi Arabia) Fahad Rudayni
- (Saudi Arabia) Mohsen Fqihe
- (Saudi Arabia) Saleh AlQarni
- (United Arab Emirates) Abdulla Alfalasi

1 goal

- (Bahrain) Sayed Abbas
- (Bahrain) Jassam Anan
- (Bahrain) Ahmed Antar
- (Bahrain) Saleh Sanjar
- (Bahrain) Falah Yusuf
- (Iraq) Ali Ahmed
- (Iraq) Ghaith Arab
- (Iraq) Haeder Drewil
- (Iraq) Ali Ismail
- (Iraq) Hamid Zirej
- (Kuwait) Salman AlBaeijan
- (Kuwait) Hamad AlAwadhi
- (Kuwait) Abduellteif AlAbasi
- (Oman) Issa Albalushi
- (Oman) Muhannad Alshibli
- (Palestine) Mousa Harara
- (Palestine) Adnan Salloum
- (Palestine) Rashid Shawahna
- (Saudi Arabia) Abdulrahman AlMulla
- (Saudi Arabia) Moath AlAsiri
- (United Arab Emirates) Hamad Alblooshi
- (United Arab Emirates) Moohammad Ali
- (United Arab Emirates) Taher Buzebar

1 own goal

- (Kuwait) Abdulrahman AlMosabehi (against Iraq)
- (Saudi Arabia) Mohsen Fqihe (against Iraq)
- (United Arab Emirates) Khalid Amheiri (against Bahrain)

== Final ranking ==
Pos	Team	Pld	W	D	L	GF	GA	GD	Pts	Final result
1	Kuwait	5	4	1	0	23	13	+10	13	Champions
2	Saudi Arabia	5	3	0	2	16	16	0	9	Runners-up
3	Oman	4	1	2	1	12	11	+1	5	Third place
4	Lebanon	4	1	2	1	9	11	−2	5	Fourth place
5	Bahrain	3	1	2	0	10	5	+5	5	Fifth place
6	Iraq	3	1	1	1	10	9	+1	4	Sixth place
7	Palestine	3	0	0	3	6	13	−7	0	Seventh place
8	United Arab Emirates	3	0	0	3	5	13	−8	0	Eighth place
