= WAFF Futsal Championship =

- Founded: 2007
- Region: Asia (WAFF)
- Teams: 5
- Current champions: Kuwait (1st title)
- Most championships: Iran (2 titles)
- Website: www.the-waff.com
- 2022 WAFF Futsal Championship

The WAFF Futsal Championship is a futsal competition organised by the West Asian Football Federation.

== Results ==
Year	Host	Final			Third Place			Number of teams
Year	Host	Winner	Score	Runner-up	Third Place	Score	Fourth Place	Number of teams
2007; Details	Iran	Iran	Round-Robin	Lebanon	Iraq	Round-Robin	Jordan	4
2009; Details	Jordan	Iraq	No playoffs	Jordan	Bahrain	No playoffs	Lebanon	5
2012; Details	Iran	Iran	No playoffs	Jordan	Iraq	No playoffs	Kuwait	5
2022; Details	Kuwait	Kuwait	5–3	Saudi Arabia	Lebanon and Oman			8

== Medal summary ==
Rank	Nation	Gold	Silver	Bronze	Total
1	Iran	2	0	0	2
2	Iraq	1	0	2	3
3	Kuwait	1	0	0	1
4	Jordan	0	2	0	2
5	Lebanon	0	1	0	1
5	Saudi Arabia	0	1	0	1
7	Bahrain	0	0	1	1
Totals (7 entries)		4	4	3	11

== Participating nations ==
Team	(Iran) 2007	(Jordan) 2009	(Iran) 2012	(Kuwait) 2022	Total
Bahrain	×	3rd	×	R1	2
Iran	1st	×	1st	×	2
Iraq	3rd	1st	3rd	R1	4
Jordan	4th	2nd	2nd	×	3
Kuwait	×	×	4th	1st	2
Saudi Arabia	×	×	×	2nd	1
United Arab Emirates	×	×	×	R1	1
Oman	×	×	×	SF	1
Lebanon	2nd	4th	×	SF	3
Palestine	×	×	5th	R1	1
Syria	×	5th	×		1
Total	4	5	5	8	—

Legend

- 1st – Champions
- 2nd – Runners-up
- 3rd – Third place
- 4th – Fourth place
- SF – Semi-final (no third place match)
- GS – Group stage
- Q — Qualified for upcoming tournament
- × — Did not participate
- — Hosts

=== By debut ===
Year	New entry team(s)
2007	Iran, Iraq, Jordan, Lebanon
2009	Bahrain, Syria
2012	Kuwait, Palestine
2022	Oman, Saudi Arabia, United Arab Emirates

== All-time table ==
As of 2022 edition

Rank	Team	Part	Pld	W	D	L	GF	GA	Dif	Pts
1	Iran	2	7	7	0	0	61	10	+51	21
2	Iraq	4	14	6	3	5	46	51	-5	21
3	Lebanon	3	11	5	2	4	32	28	+4	17
4	Kuwait	2	9	5	2	2	37	34	+3	17
5	Jordan	3	11	4	2	5	45	43	+2	14
6	Bahrain	2	7	3	2	2	21	13	+8	11
7	Saudi Arabia	1	5	3	0	2	16	15	+1	9
8	Oman	1	4	1	2	1	12	11	+1	5
9	United Arab Emirates	1	3	0	0	3	5	13	-8	0
10	Syria	1	4	0	0	4	8	20	-12	0
11	Palestine	2	7	0	0	7	15	49	-34	0

== See also ==
- WAFF Championship
- WAFF Women's Futsal Championship
