= GCC Futsal Cup =

- Founded: 2012
- Region: West Asia (AFC / UAFA)
- Teams: 6
- Current champions: Kuwait (2nd title)
- Most championships: Kuwait (2 titles)
- 2015 GCC Futsal Cup

The GCC Futsal Cup is a futsal competition for the nations of the Gulf Cooperation Council. In 2012, the GCC countries established the competition; the first tournament took place in 2013 and was won by Kuwait.

Kuwait has been the most successful team in the cup, winning 2 tournaments out of 2 in total.

== Winners ==
Year	Host nation	Final			Third Place Match		
Year	Host nation	Champion	Score	Second Place	Third Place	Score	Fourth Place
2013; Details	Qatar	Kuwait	^{n/a}	Saudi Arabia	Bahrain	^{n/a}	Qatar
2015; Details	Bahrain	Kuwait	^{4-2}	Qatar	United Arab Emirates	^{3-2}	Oman

== See also ==
- Arabian Gulf Cup
- Arab Nations Cup
- GCC U-23 Championship
- GCC U-19 Championship
- GCC U-17 Championship
