= Lucas Oliveira =

Lucas Oliveira may refer to:

- Lucas Oliveira (footballer, born 1995), Brazilian football forward
- Lucas Oliveira (footballer, born 1996), Brazilian football centre-back

== See also ==
- Lucas Evangelista (born 1995), full name Lucas Evangelista Santana de Oliveira, Brazilian football midfielder
- Lucas Marques (footballer, born 1995), full name Lucas Marques de Oliveira, Brazilian football defensive midfielder
