= Saudi Arabia national futsal team =

Saudi Arabia
- Nickname(s): الصقور الخضر (Green Falcons)
- Association: Saudi Arabian Football Federation
- Confederation: AFC (Asia)
- Head coach: (Spain) Andreu Plaza
- FIFA code: KSA
- FIFA ranking: 45 ▲3 (12 December 2025)
- Highest FIFA ranking: 61 (April 2023)
- Lowest FIFA ranking: 91 (13 July 2016)
Home colours	Away colours

First international
- Spain 8–2 Saudi Arabia (Rotterdam, Netherlands; 6 January 1989)

Biggest win
- Saudi Arabia 16–1 Palestine (Kuwait City, Kuwait; 10 December 2011)

Biggest defeat
- Iran 15–1 Saudi Arabia (Macau; 27 October 2007)

The Saudi Arabia national futsal team is controlled by the Saudi Arabian Football Federation and represents Saudi Arabia at international futsal competitions.

== Results ==
=== 2022 ===
1 April Friendly	Japan	4–2	Saudi Arabia	Khor Fakkan, United Arab Emirates
14:00 (UTC+4)	Own goal 5'; Crepaldi 15'; Yoshikawa 21'; Uchida 36'	Report	25', 39'	Stadium: Khorfakkan Stadium Arena

5 April 2022 2022 AFC Futsal Asian Cup qualification	Saudi Arabia	5–4	Palestine	Fujairah, United Arab Emirates
21:30 (UTC+4)	Rudayni 4', 34'; Al-Zahrani 17', 28'; Al-Otaibi 20' (pen.)	Report	Shawahna 22'; Salloum 25', 38'; Mohammed 26'	Stadium: Zayed Sports Complex; Referee: Helday Idang (Malaysia)

6 April 2022 2022 AFC Futsal Asian Cup qualification	Oman	2–2	Saudi Arabia	Fujairah, United Arab Emirates
19:30 (UTC+4)	Taqi 1'; Al-Maawali 25'	Report	Rudayni 2'; Al-Harthi 14'	Stadium: Zayed Sports Complex, Fujairah; Referee: Hiroyuki Kobayashi (Japan)

7 April 2022 2022 AFC Futsal Asian Cup qualification	Lebanon	3–3	Saudi Arabia	Fujairah, United Arab Emirates
19:30 (UTC+4)	Rhyem 19', 40'; Al-Harthi 40' (o.g.)	Report	Al-Maleh 5'; Al-Mulla 18'; Mubarak 21'	Stadium: Zayed Sports Complex; Referee: Jargalsaikhan Rentsenkhand (Mongolia)

28 September 2022 2022 AFC Futsal Asian Cup	Japan	1–2	Saudi Arabia	Kuwait City, Kuwait
14:00 UTC+3	Crepaldi 3'	Report	Nasser Al-Harthi 11'; Mohsen Fqihe 15'	Stadium: Saad Al Abdullah Hall; Referee: Anatoliy Rubakov (Uzbekistan)

30 September 2022 2022 AFC Futsal Asian Cup	Saudi Arabia	1–3	Vietnam	Kuwait City, Kuwait
14:00 UTC+3	Châu Đoàn Phát 31' (o.g.)	Report	Nguyễn Anh Duy 11'; Châu Đoàn Phát 28'; Nguyễn Minh Trí 40'	Stadium: Saad Al Abdullah Hall; Referee: Osama Saeed (Bahrain)

2 October 2022 2022 AFC Futsal Asian Cup	South Korea	0–4	Saudi Arabia	Kuwait City, Kuwait
14:00 UTC+3		Report	Ali 4', 23'; Rudayni 11', 39'	Stadium: Saad Al Abdullah Hall; Referee: Leung Chung Yin (Hong Kong)

=== 2023 ===
1 March 2023 NSDF Futsal Invitation Championship	Iran	11–0	Saudi Arabia	Thailand

1 March 2023 NSDF Futsal Invitation Championship	Saudi Arabia	4–1	Egypt	Thailand

=== 2024 ===
17 April 2024 2024 AFC Futsal Asian Cup	Saudi Arabia	1–5	Iraq	Bangkok Arena, Bangkok
21:00	Al-Otaibi 10:31	Report	Al-Husaynat 0:51; Al-Bayati 4:24; Al-Taie 6:11; Al-Ogaili 23:30; Tareq 31:27	Referee: Pornnarong Grairod (Thailand)

19 April 2024 2024 AFC Futsal Asian Cup	Australia	2–4	Saudi Arabia	Bangkok Arena, Bangkok
16:00	De Melo 22:47; Dib 28:57	Report	Aroan 22:16, 25:16; Al-Maleh 30:13; Al-Maghrabi 39:39	Referee: An Ran (China)

21 April 2024 2024 AFC Futsal Asian Cup	Uzbekistan	3–1	Saudi Arabia	Bangkok Arena, Bangkok
21:00	Adilov 24:40; Akhmetzyanov 31:05; Elmurodov 38:57	Report	Mohamed 2:08	Referee: Fahad Al-Hosani (United Arab Emirates)

=== 2025 ===
8 April Friendly	Vietnam	2–1	Saudi Arabia	Ho Chi Minh City, Vietnam
18:00 UTC+7	Nguyễn Thịnh Phát 23'; Vũ Ngọc Ánh 32'	Report	Fahad 38'	Stadium: Thái Sơn Nam Arena

10 April Friendly	Vietnam	3–2	Saudi Arabia	Ho Chi Minh City, Vietnam
18:00 UTC+7				Stadium: Lãnh Binh Thăng

== Tournaments ==
=== FIFA Futsal World Cup ===
World Cup record									Qualification record					
Year	Round	M	W	D	L	GF	GA	GD	M	W	D	L	GF	GA
(Netherlands) 1989	Round 1	3	0	0	3	4	27	-23	No qualification					
(Hong Kong) 1992	Did not enter								Did not enter					
(Spain) 1996	Did not enter								Did not enter					
(Guatemala) 2000	Did not enter								Qualification via AFC Futsal Asian Cup					
(Taiwan) 2004	Did not enter								Qualification via AFC Futsal Asian Cup					
(Brazil) 2008	Did not enter								Qualification via AFC Futsal Asian Cup					
(Thailand) 2012	Did not qualify								Qualification via AFC Futsal Asian Cup					
(Colombia) 2016	Did not qualify								Qualification via AFC Futsal Asian Cup					
(Lithuania) 2021	Did not qualify								Qualification via AFC Futsal Asian Cup					
(Uzbekistan) 2024	Did not qualify								Qualification via AFC Futsal Asian Cup					
Total	1/10	3	0	0	3	4	27	-23	0	0	0	0	0	0

=== AFC Futsal Asian Cup ===
Asian Cup record									Qualification record							
Year	Round	M	W	D	L	GF	GA	GD	M	W	D	L	GF	GA	GD	Link
(Malaysia) 1999	Did not enter								No Qualification							
(Thailand) 2000	Did not enter								No Qualification							
(Iran) 2001	Did not enter								No Qualification							
(Indonesia) 2002	Did not enter								No Qualification							
(Iran) 2003	Did not enter								No Qualification							
(Macau) 2004	Did not enter								No Qualification							
(Vietnam) 2005	Did not enter								No Qualification							
(Uzbekistan) 2006	Did not enter								Did not enter							
(Japan) 2007	Did not enter								Did not enter							
(Thailand) 2008	Did not enter								Did not enter							
(Uzbekistan) 2010	Did not enter								Did not enter							
(United Arab Emirates) 2012	Did not qualify								4	2	0	2	27	14	+13	Link
(Vietnam) 2014	Did not qualify								4	0	1	3	10	15	-5	Link
(Uzbekistan) 2016	Group stage	3	0	1	2	7	11	-4	3	0	1	2	4	9	-5	Link
(Taiwan) 2018	Did not qualify								3	0	3	0	7	7	0	Link
(Turkmenistan) 2020	Cancelled								3	1	1	1	10	8	+2	Link
(Kuwait) 2022	Group stage	3	2	0	1	7	4	+3	3	1	2	0	10	9	+1	Link
(Thailand) 2024	Group stage	3	1	0	2	6	10	-4	3	2	0	1	14	5	+9	Link
(Indonesia) 2026	Group stage	3	1	0	2	6	6	0	3	2	0	1	19	2	+17	Link
Total:4/18	Group stage	12	4	1	7	26	31	-5	26	8	8	10	101	69	+32	-

=== Islamic Solidarity Games ===
Islamic Solidarity Games record
Year	Round	Rank	M	W	D	L	GF	GA	GD
(Saudi Arabia) 2025	Fourth Place	4th	5	2	1	2	16	13	+3
Total	1 title	1/1	5	2	1	2	16	13	+3

=== Asian Indoor and Martial Arts Games ===
Asian Indoor and Martial Arts Games record
Year	Round	Pld	W	D	L	GF	GA	GD
(Thailand) 2005	Did not enter							
(Macau) 2007	Group Stage	4	1	0	3	15	29	-14
(Vietnam) 2009	Did not enter							
(South Korea) 2013	Group Stage	2	0	0	2	1	7	-6
(Turkmenistan) 2017	Did not enter							
Total	2/5	6	1	0	5	16	36	-20

=== Arab Futsal Championship ===
Arab Futsal Championship record
Year	Round	Pld	W	D	L	GF	GA	GD
(Egypt) 1998	Did not enter							
(Libya) 2005	Did not enter							
(Egypt) 2007	Did not enter							
(Egypt) 2008	Did not enter							
(Saudi Arabia) 2022	6th	3	1	0	2	11	12	-1
(Saudi Arabia) 2023	7th	4	1	1	2	17	14	+3
Total	2/6	7	2	1	4	28	26	+2

=== GCC Futsal Cup ===
GCC Futsal Cup record
Year	Round	Pld	W	D	L	GF	GA	GD
(Qatar) 2013	Runners-up	4	2	1	1	15	13	+2
(Bahrain) 2015	6th	5	0	2	3	12	19	-7
Total	2/2	9	2	3	4	27	32	-5

=== WAFF Futsal Championship ===
2022 WAFF Futsal Championship

Palestine 1–2 Saudi Arabia

Saudi Arabia 4–5 Kuwait

Saudi Arabia 3–2 Iraq

Saudi Arabia 4–3 Oman

Saudi Arabia 3–5 Kuwait

=== 2022 GCC Games ===
Bahrain 1-3 Saudi Arabia

Saudi Arabia 2-3 Kuwait

UAE 5-2 Saudi Arabia

Saudi Arabia 3-0 Oman

== Summary Results ==
As of 30 March 2024

Year	M	W	D	L	GF	GA	GD	Ref
1995	0	0	0	0	0	0	0	
1996	0	0	0	0	0	0	0	
1997	0	0	0	0	0	0	0	
1998	0	0	0	0	0	0	0	
1999	0	0	0	0	0	0	0	
2000	0	0	0	0	0	0	0	
2001	0	0	0	0	0	0	0	
2002	0	0	0	0	0	0	0	
2003	0	0	0	0	0	0	0	
2004	0	0	0	0	0	0	0	
2005	0	0	0	0	0	0	0	
2006	0	0	0	0	0	0	0	
2007	0	0	0	0	0	0	0	
2008	0	0	0	0	0	0	0	
2009	0	0	0	0	0	0	0	
2010	0	0	0	0	0	0	0	
2011	0	0	0	0	0	0	0	
2012	0	0	0	0	0	0	0	
2013	0	0	0	0	0	0	0	
2014	0	0	0	0	0	0	0	
2015	0	0	0	0	0	0	0	
2016	0	0	0	0	0	0	0	
2017	0	0	0	0	0	0	0	
2018	0	0	0	0	0	0	0	
2019	0	0	0	0	0	0	0	
2020	0	0	0	0	0	0	0	
2021	0	0	0	0	0	0	0	
2022	0	0	0	0	0	0	0	
2023	0	0	0	0	0	0	0	
2024	0	0	0	0	0	0	0	
Total	0	0	0	0	0	0	+0	
