= 2021 Arab Futsal Cup =

كأس العرب لكرة القدم داخل الصالات 2021

Tournament details
- Host country: Egypt
- Dates: 20 − 29 May
- Teams: 8 (from 2 confederations)
- Venue: 1 (in 1 host city)

Final positions
- Champions: Morocco (1st title)
- Runners-up: Egypt

Tournament statistics
- Matches played: 15
- Goals scored: 89 (5.93 per match)
- Attendance: 0 (0 per match)
- Top scorer: (Morocco) Achraf Saoud (7 goals)
- Best player: (Morocco) Anás El Ayyane
- Best goalkeeper: (Morocco) Reda Khiyari

The 2021 Arab Futsal Cup hosted by the Egyptian city of 6th of October City was the fifth edition of the Arab Futsal Cup between 20 and 29 May 2021. Eight teams took part. Apart from Egypt and Morocco, all other participating teams (Bahrain, Comoros, Kuwait, Mauritania, Saudi Arabia and United Arab Emirates) made their tournament debut.

In this edition, the competition changed its name from Arab Futsal Championship to Arab Futsal Cup. It also marked the return of the competition after a 13-year hiatus.

Morocco defeated Egypt 4–0 in the final to win their first title.

== Qualification ==
The following eight teams qualified for the final tournament.

Team	Appearance	Previous best performance
Bahrain	1st	Debut
Comoros	1st	Debut
Egypt (hosts)	5th	Champions (1998, 2005)
Kuwait	1st	Debut
Mauritania	1st	Debut
Morocco	4th	Runners-up (1998, 2005)
Saudi Arabia	1st	Debut
United Arab Emirates	1st	Debut

== Venue ==
6th of October City	2021 Arab Futsal Cup is located in Egypt
Dr. Hassan Moustafa Sports Hall	2021 Arab Futsal Cup is located in Egypt
Capacity: 4,500	2021 Arab Futsal Cup is located in Egypt

29.953885°N 30.916967°E

== Group stage ==
The teams are divided into two groups.

=== Group 1 ===
Pos	Team	Pld	W	D	L	GF	GA	GD	Pts	Qualification
1	Egypt	3	2	1	0	11	3	+8	7	Semi-finals
2	Bahrain	3	2	0	1	9	5	+4	6	Semi-finals
3	Kuwait	3	1	1	1	12	6	+6	4	
4	Mauritania	3	0	0	3	4	22	−18	0	

20 May 2021
15:00

Egypt	8–1	Mauritania

Dr. Hassan Moustafa Sports Hall, 6th of October City
20 May 2021
18:00

Bahrain	3–2	Kuwait

Dr. Hassan Moustafa Sports Hall, 6th of October City

22 May 2021
15:00

Kuwait	2–2	Egypt

Dr. Hassan Moustafa Sports Hall, 6th of October City
22 May 2021
18:00

Mauritania	2–6	Bahrain

Dr. Hassan Moustafa Sports Hall, 6th of October City

24 May 2021
15:00

Egypt	1–0	Bahrain

Dr. Hassan Moustafa Sports Hall, 6th of October City
24 May 2021
18:00

Kuwait	8–1	Mauritania

Dr. Hassan Moustafa Sports Hall, 6th of October City

=== Group 2 ===
Pos	Team	Pld	W	D	L	GF	GA	GD	Pts	Qualification
1	Morocco	3	3	0	0	16	2	+14	9	Semi-finals
2	United Arab Emirates	3	2	0	1	10	9	+1	6	Semi-finals
3	Saudi Arabia	3	1	0	2	7	15	−8	3	
4	Comoros	3	0	0	3	3	10	−7	0	

21 May 2021
15:00

Morocco	5–1	United Arab Emirates

Dr. Hassan Moustafa Sports Hall, 6th of October City
21 May 2021
18:00

Saudi Arabia	4–1	Comoros

Dr. Hassan Moustafa Sports Hall, 6th of October City

23 May 2021
15:00

Comoros	1–3	Morocco

Dr. Hassan Moustafa Sports Hall, 6th of October City
23 May 2021
18:00

United Arab Emirates	6–3	Saudi Arabia

Dr. Hassan Moustafa Sports Hall, 6th of October City

25 May 2021
15:00

Morocco	8–0	Saudi Arabia

Dr. Hassan Moustafa Sports Hall, 6th of October City
25 May 2021
18:00

Comoros	1–3	United Arab Emirates

Dr. Hassan Moustafa Sports Hall, 6th of October City

== Knockout stage ==
=== Bracket ===
Semi-finals
27 May – Dr. Hassan Moustafa Sports Hall, 6th of October City
Egypt	4
United Arab Emirates	3
27 May – Dr. Hassan Moustafa Sports Hall, 6th of October City
Morocco	6
Bahrain	0

Final
29 May – Dr. Hassan Moustafa Sports Hall, 6th of October City
Egypt	0
Morocco	4

=== Semi-finals ===
27 May 2021
15:00

Egypt	4–3 (a.e.t.)	United Arab Emirates

Dr. Hassan Moustafa Sports Hall, 6th of October City

27 May 2021
18:00

Morocco	6–0	Bahrain

Dr. Hassan Moustafa Sports Hall, 6th of October City

=== Final ===
29 May 2021
12:00

Egypt	0–4	Morocco

Dr. Hassan Moustafa Sports Hall, 6th of October City

== Honors ==
2021 Arab Futsal Cup

Morocco
First title

- Best Player: Anás El Ayyane - Morocco
- Best Goalkeeper: Reda Khiyari - Morocco
- Top Goal Scorer: Achraf Saoud (7) - Morocco

== Tournament ranking ==
Per statistical convention in football, matches decided in extra time are counted as wins and losses, while matches decided by penalty shoot-out are counted as draws.

Pos	Team	Pld	W	D	L	GF	GA	GD	Pts	Final result
1	Morocco	5	5	0	0	26	2	+24	15	Champions
2	Egypt	5	3	1	1	15	10	+5	10	Runners-up
3	United Arab Emirates	4	2	0	2	13	13	0	6	Third place
4	Bahrain	4	2	0	2	9	11	−2	6	Fourth place
5	Kuwait	3	1	1	1	12	6	+6	4	Eliminated in Group stage
6	Saudi Arabia	3	1	0	2	7	15	−8	3	Eliminated in Group stage
7	Comoros	3	0	0	3	3	10	−7	0	Eliminated in Group stage
8	Mauritania	3	0	0	3	4	22	−18	0	Eliminated in Group stage
