= 2015 GCC Futsal Cup =

Tournament details
- Host country: Bahrain
- Dates: 14–30 May
- Teams: 6 (from 1 confederation)
- Venues: 2 (in 1 host city)

Final positions
- Champions: Kuwait (1st title)
- Runners-up: Qatar
- Third place: United Arab Emirates
- Fourth place: Oman

Tournament statistics
- Matches played: 19
- Goals scored: 109 (5.74 per match)

The 2015 GCC Futsal Cup (Arabic: كأس الخليج للصالات) was the second edition of the biennial Futsal competition. It took place in Bahrain in 2015.

== Tournament ==
The six teams in the tournament played a single round-robin style competition. The four top teams advance to Semi-finals

Team	Pld	W	D	L	GF	GA	GD	Pts
Kuwait	5	4	1	0	23	10	+12	13
Qatar	5	3	1	1	14	10	+4	10
United Arab Emirates	5	2	2	1	8	7	-1	8
Oman	5	2	0	3	13	16	-3	6
Bahrain	5	1	0	4	6	14	-8	3
Saudi Arabia	5	0	2	3	12	19	-7	2

== Round-robin Results ==
https://www.goalzz.com/main.aspx?c=5942&stage=1&sch=true

Oman 2 : 6 Kuwait

Qatar 4 : 1 Saudi Arabia

Bahrain 0 : 1 United Arab Emirates

Qatar 4 : 3 Oman

Kuwait 3 : 1 United Arab Emirates

Bahrain 4 : 2 Saudi Arabia

Saudi Arabia 4 : 4 Kuwait

Oman 0 : 2 United Arab Emirates

Bahrain 0 : 2 Qatar

United Arab Emirates 2 : 2 Qatar

Saudi Arabia 3 : 5 Oman

Kuwait 6 : 1 Bahrain

Saudi Arabia 2 : 2 United Arab Emirates

Qatar 2 : 4 Kuwait

Oman 3 : 1 Bahrain

== Knockouts ==
=== Semi-final ===
Kuwait	5-0	Oman

Qatar	4-3	United Arab Emirates

=== third-Place ===
United Arab Emirates	3-2	Oman

=== Final ===
Kuwait	4-2	Qatar

== Result ==
2015 GCC Futsal Cup winners

Kuwait
Second title
