= Qatar national futsal team =

Futsal team of Qatar

Qatar
- Nickname(s): Al-Annabi (The Maroons)
- Association: Qatar Football Association
- Confederation: AFC (Asia)
- Head coach: Tiago Polido
- FIFA code: QAT
- FIFA ranking: 89 ▲1 (24 September 2026)
Home colours	Away colours

First international
- Qatar 3–7 South Korea (Ho Chi Minh City, Vietnam; 23 May 2005)

Biggest win
- Qatar 19–1 Timor-Leste (Macau, Macau; 27 October 2007)

Biggest defeat
- Uzbekistan 15–0 Qatar (Bangkok, Thailand; 12 November 2005)

FIFA World Cup
- Appearances: None

AFC Futsal Championship
- Appearances: 3 (First in 2005)
- Best result: Round 1 (2005, 2012 and 2016)

Asian Indoor and Martial Arts Games
- Appearances: 3 (First in 2005)
- Best result: Quarterfinals (2005)

Grand Prix de Futsal
- Appearances: 1 (First in 2010)
- Best result: 16th place (2010)

The Qatar national futsal team represents Qatar in international futsal competitions. It has only qualified for three AFC Futsal Championships.

== Tournaments ==
=== FIFA Futsal World Cup ===
World Cup Record
Year	Round	Pld	W	D	L	GS	GA
(Netherlands) 1989	Did not enter						
(Hong Kong) 1992	Did not enter						
(Spain) 1996	Did not enter						
(Guatemala) 2000	Did not enter						
(Taiwan) 2004	Did not enter						
(Brazil) 2008	Did not qualify						
(Thailand) 2012	Did not qualify						
(Colombia) 2016	Did not qualify						
(Lithuania) 2020	Did not qualify						
(Uzbekistan) 2024	Did not qualify						
Total	0/10	–	–	–	–	–	–

=== AFC Futsal Championship ===
AFC Futsal Asian Cup record
Year	Round	Rank	Pld	W	D	L	GS	GA	GD
(Malaysia) 1999	Did not enter								
(Thailand) 2000	Did not enter								
(Iran) 2001	Did not enter								
(Indonesia) 2002	Did not enter								
(Iran) 2003	Did not enter								
(Macau) 2004	Did not enter								
(Vietnam) 2005	Round 1	19/24	6	1	0	5	32	48	−16
(Uzbekistan) 2006	Did not enter								
(Japan) 2007	Did not enter								
(Thailand) 2008	Did not qualify								
(Uzbekistan) 2010	Did not qualify								
(United Arab Emirates) 2012	Round 1	12/16	3	1	0	2	7	14	−7
(Vietnam) 2014	Did not qualify								
(Uzbekistan) 2016	Round 1	9/16	3	1	0	2	8	8	0
(Taiwan) 2018	Did not qualify								
(Turkmenistan) 2020	Did not qualify								
(Kuwait) 2022	Did not qualify								
(Thailand) 2024	Did not qualify								
(Indonesia) 2026	Did not qualify								
Total	3/18	0	12	3	0	9	47	70	−23

=== Futsal at the Asian Indoor and Martial Arts Games ===
- 2005 – Quarter-finals
- 2007 – Round 1
- 2009 – Did not enter
- 2013 – Round 1

=== Grand Prix de Futsal ===
- 2005 – Did not enter
- 2006 – Did not enter
- 2007 – Did not enter
- 2008 – Did not enter
- 2009 – Did not enter
- 2010 – 16th place
- 2011 – Did not enter
- 2013 – Did not enter
- 2014 – Did not enter
- 2015 – Did not enter
- 2016 – TBD

=== Arab Futsal Championship ===
Arab Futsal Championship record
Year	Round	Pld	W	D	L	GS	GA	DIF
(Egypt) 1998	Did not enter							
(Libya) 2005	Did not enter							
(Egypt) 2007	Did not enter							
(Egypt) 2008	Did not enter							
(Egypt) 2021	Did not enter							
Total	0/5	0	0	0	0	0	0	0

=== GCC Futsal Cup ===
GCC Futsal Cup record
Year	Round	Pld	W	D	L	GS	GA	DIF
(Qatar) 2013	4th Place	4	1	1	2	14	13	+1
(Bahrain) 2015	Runners-up	7	4	1	2	20	17	+3
Total	2/2	11	5	2	4	34	30	+4

== Managerial history ==
- (Spain) Eduardo Garcia Belda
- (Brazil) Flavio Do Amaral (July 2014-July 2015)
- (Czech Republic) Michel Stráž (Jan 2015–??) (CT)
- (Portugal) Tiago Polido (Aug 2015–)
