= 2010 Grand Prix de Futsal =

Tournament details
- Host country: Brazil
- Dates: 17 October – 24 October
- Teams: 16 (from 5 confederations)
- Venue: 2 (in 1 host city)

Final positions
- Champions: Spain (1st title)
- Runners-up: Brazil
- Third place: Paraguay
- Fourth place: Iran

Tournament statistics
- Matches played: 48
- Goals scored: 284 (5.92 per match)
- Top scorer: (Russia) Pula (11 goals)

The 2010 Grand Prix de Futsal was the sixth edition of the international futsal competition of the same kind as the FIFA Futsal World Cup but with invited nations and held annually in Brazil. It was first held in 2005.

This was the first and so far the only edition of the Grand Prix de Futsal not won by Brazil.

== Venues ==
Arena	Ginásio Newton de Faria	Ginásio da UniEvangélica
City	Anápolis	Anápolis
Capacity	6,000	2,000

== Participating ==
The following 16 teams, shown with they pre-tournament rankings.

AFC (2)

- Iran (6)
- Qatar (83)

CAF (2)

- Libya (28)
- Zambia (100)

CONCACAF (2)

- Costa Rica (24)
- Guatemala (30)

CONMEBOL (3)

- Argentina (7)
- Brazil (1)
- Paraguay (11)

UEFA (7)

- Czech Republic (16)
- Italy (3)
- Netherlands (20)
- Portugal (5)
- Romania (12)
- Russia (4)
- Spain (2)

=== Draw pots ===
- Pot 1

Brazil
Argentina
Iran
Paraguay

- Pot 2

Spain
Libya
Portugal
Zambia

- Pot 3

Italy
Costa Rica
Guatemala
Qatar

- Pot 4

Russia
Czech Republic
Netherlands
Romania

== Squads ==
Each nation submitted a squad of 15 players, including three goalkeepers.

== First round ==
=== Group A ===
Team	Pld	W	D	L	GF	GA	GD	Pts
Brazil	3	3	0	0	19	3	+16	9
Czech Republic	3	1	1	1	11	13	−2	4
Libya	3	0	2	1	6	7	-1	2
Costa Rica	3	0	1	2	5	18	−13	1

2010-10-17

Brazil	9–2	Czech Republic

Ginásio Newton de Faria
2010-10-17

Costa Rica	2–5	Libya

Ginásio da UniEvangélica
2010-10-18

Costa Rica	0–8	Brazil

Ginásio Newton de Faria
2010-10-18

Libya	2–2	Czech Republic

Ginásio da UniEvangélica
2010-10-19

Brazil	2–1	Libya

Ginásio Newton de Faria
2010-10-19

Czech Republic	7–2	Costa Rica

Ginásio da UniEvangélica

=== Group B ===
Team	Pld	W	D	L	GF	GA	GD	Pts
Spain	3	3	0	0	24	3	+21	9
Argentina	3	1	1	1	9	7	+2	4
Romania	3	1	1	1	7	10	−3	4
Qatar	3	0	0	3	2	22	−20	0

2010-10-17

Spain	13–0	Qatar

Ginásio Newton de Faria
2010-10-17

Argentina	2–2	Romania

Ginásio da UniEvangélica
2010-10-18

Argentina	2–4	Spain

Ginásio Newton de Faria
2010-10-18

Romania	4–1	Qatar

Ginásio da UniEvangélica
2010-10-19

Spain	7–1	Romania

Ginásio Newton de Faria
2010-10-19

Qatar	1–5	Argentina

Ginásio da UniEvangélica

=== Group C ===
Team	Pld	W	D	L	GF	GA	GD	Pts
Paraguay	3	3	0	0	13	2	+11	9
Italy	3	2	0	1	6	3	+3	6
Netherlands	3	1	0	2	9	9	0	3
Zambia	3	0	0	3	1	15	−14	0

2010-10-17

Italy	2–0	Zambia

Ginásio Newton de Faria
2010-10-17

Netherlands	1–5	Paraguay

Ginásio da UniEvangélica
2010-10-18

Netherlands	1–3	Italy

Ginásio Newton de Faria
2010-10-18

Paraguay	6–0	Zambia

Ginásio da UniEvangélica
2010-10-19

Italy	1–2	Paraguay

Ginásio Newton de Faria
2010-10-19

Zambia	1–7	Netherlands

Ginásio da UniEvangélica

=== Group D ===
Team	Pld	W	D	L	GF	GA	GD	Pts
Iran	3	2	1	0	13	6	+7	7
Portugal	3	2	0	1	7	6	+1	6
Russia	3	1	1	1	10	4	+6	4
Guatemala	3	0	0	3	1	15	−14	0

2010-10-17

Russia	2–2	Iran

Ginásio Newton de Faria
2010-10-17

Portugal	2–0	Guatemala

Ginásio da UniEvangélica
2010-10-18

Portugal	2–1	Russia

Ginásio Newton de Faria
2010-10-18

Guatemala	1–6	Iran

Ginásio da UniEvangélica
2010-10-19

Russia	7–0	Guatemala

Ginásio Newton de Faria
2010-10-19

Iran	5–3	Portugal

Ginásio da UniEvangélica

== Final round ==
=== Classification 9th–16th ===
Ginásio da UniEvangélica

Quarter finals
October 21
Libya	1
Zambia	0
October 21
Netherlands	2
Costa Rica	4
October 21
Romania	2
Guatemala	3
October 21
Russia	9
Qatar	2

Semifinals
October 22
Libya	5
Costa Rica	2
October 22
Guatemala	4
Russia	7

9th place
October 23
Libya	0
Russia	2
11th place
October 23
Costa Rica	1
Guatemala	3

Semifinals
October 22
Zambia	2
Netherlands	8
October 22
Romania	4
Qatar	1

13th place
October 23
Netherlands	3
Romania	1
15th place
October 23
Zambia	6
Qatar	3

==== 9th–16th playoffs ====
2010-10-21

Libya	1–0	Zambia

Ginásio da UniEvangélica
2010-10-21

Netherlands	2–4	Costa Rica

Ginásio da UniEvangélica
2010-10-21

Romania	2–3	Guatemala

Ginásio da UniEvangélica
2010-10-21

Russia	9–2	Qatar

Ginásio da UniEvangélica

==== 13th–16th playoffs ====
2010-10-22

Zambia	2–8	Netherlands

Ginásio da UniEvangélica
2010-10-22

Romania	4–1	Qatar

Ginásio da UniEvangélica

==== 9th–12th playoffs ====
2010-10-22

Libya	5–2	Costa Rica

Ginásio da UniEvangélica
2010-10-22

Guatemala	4–7	Russia

Ginásio da UniEvangélica

==== 15th place match ====
2010-10-23

Zambia	6–3	Qatar

Ginásio da UniEvangélica

==== 13th place match ====
2010-10-23

Netherlands	3–1	Romania

Ginásio da UniEvangélica

==== 11th place match ====
2010-10-23

Costa Rica	1–3	Guatemala

Ginásio da UniEvangélica

==== 9th place match ====
2010-10-23

Libya	0–2	Russia

Ginásio da UniEvangélica

=== Classification 1st–8th ===
Ginásio Newton de Faria

Quarter finals
October 21
Iran (aet)	2
Argentina	0
October 21
Spain	3
Portugal	1
October 21
Paraguay	7
Czech Republic	2
October 21
Brazil	6
Italy	1

Semifinals
October 22
Iran	4
Spain	6
October 22
Paraguay	3
Brazil	5

Final
October 24
Spain	2
Brazil	1
3rd place
October 23
Iran	3
Paraguay (aet)	5

Semifinals
October 22
Argentina	1
Portugal	2
October 22
Czech Republic	2
Italy	4

5th place
October 23
Portugal	0
Italy	3
7th place
October 23
Czech Republic	1
Argentina	2

==== Quarterfinals ====
2010-10-21

Iran	2–0 (a.e.t.)	Argentina

Ginásio Newton de Faria
2010-10-21

Spain	3–1	Portugal

Ginásio Newton de Faria
2010-10-21

Paraguay	7–2	Czech Republic

Ginásio Newton de Faria
2010-10-21

Brazil	6–1	Italy

Ginásio Newton de Faria

==== 5th–8th playoffs ====
2010-10-22

Argentina	1–2	Portugal

Ginásio Newton de Faria
2010-10-22

Czech Republic	2–4	Italy

Ginásio Newton de Faria

==== Semifinals ====
2010-10-22

Iran	4–6	Spain

Ginásio Newton de Faria
2010-10-22

Paraguay	3–5	Brazil

Ginásio Newton de Faria

==== 7th place match ====
2010-10-23

Czech Republic	1–2	Argentina

Ginásio Newton de Faria

==== 5th place match ====
2010-10-23

Portugal	0–3	Italy

Ginásio Newton de Faria

==== 3rd place match ====
2010-10-23

Iran	3–5 (a.e.t.)	Paraguay

Ginásio Newton de Faria

==== Final ====
2010-10-24

Spain	2–1	Brazil

Ginásio Newton de Faria

== Winner ==
Grand Prix de Futsal
2010 winners

Spain
First title

== Final standing ==
Rank	Team
1st place, gold medalist(s)	Spain
2nd place, silver medalist(s)	Brazil
3rd place, bronze medalist(s)	Paraguay
4	Iran
5	Italy
6	Portugal
7	Argentina
8	Czech Republic
9	Russia
10	Libya
11	Guatemala
12	Costa Rica
13	Netherlands
14	Romania
15	Zambia
16	Qatar

== See also ==
- VI GRAND PRIX FUTSAL – Sorteio-Final Draw
- GRAND PRIX 2010
