= 2016 AFC Futsal Championship =

Futzal Bo'yicha 2016 Yilgi Osiyo Chempionati

Tournament details
- Host country: Uzbekistan
- Dates: 10–21 February
- Teams: 16 (from 1 confederation)
- Venue: 2 (in 1 host city)

Final positions
- Champions: Iran (11th title)
- Runners-up: Uzbekistan
- Third place: Thailand
- Fourth place: Vietnam

Tournament statistics
- Matches played: 35
- Goals scored: 234 (6.69 per match)
- Attendance: 33,275 (951 per match)
- Top scorer: (Thailand) Suphawut Thueanklang (14 goals)
- Best player: (Iran) Ali Asghar Hassanzadeh
- Fair play award: Iran

The 2016 AFC Futsal Championship was the 14th edition of the AFC Futsal Championship, the biennial international futsal championship organised by the Asian Football Confederation (AFC) for the men's national teams of Asia. The tournament was held in Uzbekistan between 10–21 February 2016. A total of 16 teams played in the tournament.

The tournament was originally meant to be held in Taiwan (i.e. the Republic of China). It was originally scheduled for 12–27 March 2016, but this was changed following the adoption of the FIFA futsal international match calendar.

Same as previous editions held on the same year as the FIFA Futsal World Cup, the tournament acted as the AFC qualifiers for the World Cup. The top five teams of the tournament qualified for the 2016 FIFA Futsal World Cup in Colombia as the AFC representatives.

Champions Iran, runners-up Uzbekistan, third-placed Thailand, fourth-placed Vietnam and fifth place's play-off winners Australia qualified for the 2016 FIFA Futsal World Cup as the AFC representatives.

== Qualification ==
The draw for the qualifiers was held on 2 September 2015. Four teams qualified directly for the final tournament by their 2014 performance, while the other entrants competed in the qualifying stage for the remaining 12 spots. The qualifiers were played between 1 October and 19 November 2015.

=== Qualified teams ===
The following 16 teams qualified for the final tournament. Kuwait were replaced by Saudi Arabia due to FIFA's suspension of the Kuwait Football Association.

Team	Qualified as	Appearance	Previous best performance
Uzbekistan	Hosts and 2014 third place	14th	Runners-up (2001, 2006, 2010)
Japan	2014 winners	14th	Champions (2006, 2012, 2014)
Iran	2014 runners-up	14th	Champions (1999, 2000, 2001, 2002, 2003, 2004, 2005, 2007, 2008, 2010)
Lebanon	West Zone Group A winners	10th	Quarter-finals (2004, 2007, 2008, 2010, 2012, 2014)
Jordan	West Zone Group A runners-up	1st	Debut
Saudi Arabia	West Zone Group A third place	1st	Debut
Qatar	West Zone Group B winners	3rd	Group stage (2005, 2012)
Iraq	West Zone Group B runners-up	10th	Quarter-finals (2002)
Kyrgyzstan	Central Zone winners	14th	Fourth place (2005, 2006, 2007)
Tajikistan	Central Zone runners-up	9th	Quarter-finals (2007)
Thailand	ASEAN Zone Group A winners	14th	Runners-up (2008, 2012)
Malaysia	ASEAN Zone Group A runners-up	11th	Group stage (1999, 2001, 2002, 2003, 2004, 2005, 2006, 2007, 2008, 2014)
Australia	ASEAN Zone Group B winners	7th	Fourth place (2012)
Vietnam	ASEAN Zone Group B runners-up	4th	Quarter-finals (2014)
China	East Zone winners	11th	Fourth place (2008, 2010)
Chinese Taipei	East Zone runners-up	11th	Quarter-finals (2003)

== Venues ==
Tashkent
Uzbekistan Stadium	Universal Stadium
Capacity: Unknown	Capacity: Unknown

== Squads ==
Each team had to submit a squad of 14 players, including a minimum of two goalkeepers.

== Draw ==
The draw for the final tournament was held on 2 December 2015, 18:00 UZT (UTC+5), at the Zafarshan Hall in Tashkent. The 16 teams were drawn into four groups of four teams. The teams were seeded according to their performance in the previous season in 2014.

Pot 1	Pot 2	Pot 3	Pot 4
1. Uzbekistan (hosts); 2. Japan; 3. Iran; 4. Thailand	5. Australia; 6. Lebanon; 7. Vietnam; 8. Iraq	9. Kyrgyzstan; 10. Malaysia; 11. Chinese Taipei; 12. China	13. Tajikistan; 14. Saudi Arabia; 15. Qatar; 16. Jordan

== Match officials ==
The following referees were chosen for the 2016 AFC Futsal Championship.

Referees

- (Australia) Chris Colley
- (China) An Ran
- (China) Liu Jianqiao
- (Chinese Taipei) Lee Po-fu
- (Iran) Vahid Arzpeyma Mohammreh
- (Iraq) Hasan Mousa Al-Gburi
- (Iraq) Hawkar Salar Ahmed
- (Japan) Tomohiro Kozaki
- (Japan) Hiroyuki Kobayashi
- (Jordan) Husein Mahmoud Khalaileh
- (Kyrgyzstan) Nurdin Bukuev
- (Malaysia) Helday Idang
- (Philippines) Rey Ritaga Martinez
- (Thailand) Yuttakon Maiket
- (United Arab Emirates) Khamis Hassan Al Shamsi
- (Vietnam) Trương Quốc Dũng

== Group stage ==
The top two teams of each group advanced to the quarter-finals.

Tiebreakers

The teams were ranked according to points (3 points for a win, 1 point for a draw, 0 points for a loss). If tied on points, tiebreakers would be applied in the following order:

1. Greater number of points obtained in the group matches between the teams concerned;
2. Goal difference resulting from the group matches between the teams concerned;
3. Greater number of goals scored in the group matches between the teams concerned;
4. If, after applying criteria 1 to 3, teams still have an equal ranking, criteria 1 to 3 are reapplied exclusively to the matches between the teams in question to determine their final rankings. If this procedure does not lead to a decision, criteria 5 to 9 apply;
5. Goal difference in all the group matches;
6. Greater number of goals scored in all the group matches;
7. Penalty shoot-out if only two teams are involved and they are both on the field of play;
8. Fewer score calculated according to the number of yellow and red cards received in the group matches (1 point for a single yellow card, 3 points for a red card as a consequence of two yellow cards, 3 points for a direct red card, 4 points for a yellow card followed by a direct red card);
9. Drawing of lots.

All times were local, UZT (UTC+5).

=== Group A ===
Pos	Team	Pld	W	D	L	GF	GA	GD	Pts	Qualification
1	Uzbekistan (H)	3	3	0	0	9	3	+6	9	Knockout stage
2	Kyrgyzstan	3	1	1	1	8	8	0	4	Knockout stage
3	Lebanon	3	0	2	1	7	9	−2	2	
4	Saudi Arabia	3	0	1	2	7	11	−4	1	

Source: AFC
Rules for classification: Group stage tiebreakers
(H) Hosts
10 February 2016
16:00

Lebanon	4–4	Kyrgyzstan
Kobeissy 23', 32'; Tneich 24'; Zeitoun 28'	Report	Rusl. Ermekov 3'; Baigazy 9'; Alimov 25', 40'

Uzbekistan Stadium, Tashkent
Attendance: 1,800
Referee: Tomohiro Kozaki (Japan)
10 February 2016
19:00

Uzbekistan	5–2	Saudi Arabia
Choriev 17', 26'; Shalipov 25'; Yunusov 30'; Sviridov 33'	Report	Atiah 24'; Zafer 26'

Uzbekistan Stadium, Tashkent
Attendance: 2,600
Referee: Chris Colley (Australia)

12 February 2016
16:30

Saudi Arabia	3–3	Lebanon
Azmi 13'; Atiah 14'; Nawaf 33'	Report	Azmi 2' (o.g.); Kheir El Dine 14'; Tneich 24'

Uzbekistan Stadium, Tashkent
Attendance: 1,800
Referee: Yuttakon Maiket (Thailand)
12 February 2016
19:00

Kyrgyzstan	1–2	Uzbekistan
Alimov 40'	Report	Rakhmatov 20', 23'

Uzbekistan Stadium, Tashkent
Attendance: 2,600
Referee: Rey Ritaga (Philippines)

14 February 2016
19:00

Uzbekistan	2–0	Lebanon
Anorov 11'; Abdumavlyanov 16'	Report

Uzbekistan Stadium, Tashkent
Attendance: 2,600
Referee: Chris Colley (Australia)
14 February 2016
19:00

Kyrgyzstan	3–2	Saudi Arabia
Rust. Ermekov 4'; Chotbaev 16'; Alimov 38'	Report	Atiah 1'; Nasser 40'

Universal Stadium, Tashkent
Attendance: 250
Referee: Tomohiro Kozaki (Japan)

=== Group B ===
Pos	Team	Pld	W	D	L	GF	GA	GD	Pts	Qualification
1	Iran	3	3	0	0	26	2	+24	9	Knockout stage
2	Iraq	3	2	0	1	12	17	−5	6	Knockout stage
3	China	3	1	0	2	6	14	−8	3	
4	Jordan	3	0	0	3	4	15	−11	0	

Source: AFC
Rules for classification: Group stage tiebreakers
10 February 2016
16:00

Iraq	6–1	China
Waleed 13', 30'; Al-Zubaidi 18'; Rafid 26'; Saif 35', 38'	Report	Wang Hongwei 20'

Universal Stadium, Tashkent
Attendance: 50
Referee: Trương Quốc Dũng (Vietnam)
10 February 2016
19:00

Iran	6–0	Jordan
Hassanzadeh 2', 27'; Tayyebi 10'; Bahadori 31'; Javid 34', 36'	Report

Universal Stadium, Tashkent
Attendance: 500
Referee: Lee Po-fu (Chinese Taipei)

12 February 2016
16:30

China	0–7	Iran
	Report	Taheri 1'; Hassanzadeh 6'; Ahmadi 17'; Keshavarz 26', 28'; Tayyebi 27'; Bahadori 32'

Universal Stadium, Tashkent
Attendance: 350
Referee: Hiroyuki Kobayashi (Japan)
12 February 2016
19:00

Jordan	3–4	Iraq
Samih 5', 29'; Atef 26'	Report	Waleed 21'; Rafid 29'; Salim 36'; Firas 37'

Universal Stadium, Tashkent
Attendance: 300
Referee: Helday Idang (Malaysia)

14 February 2016
16:30

Iran	13–2	Iraq
Taheri 1', 10'; Tayyebi 3', 11', 18', 28'; Hassanzadeh 5', 40'; Ahmadi 6'; Javid 6', 15', 34'; Tavakoli 20'	Report	Waleed 17'; Amjad 38'

Uzbekistan Stadium, Tashkent
Attendance: 1,700
Referee: Trương Quốc Dũng (Vietnam)
14 February 2016
16:30

China	5–1	Jordan
Zeng Liang 25'; He Yihui 31'; Wang Hongwei 33'; Zhao Liang 36'; Li Jianjia 37'	Report	Mohammad 39'

Universal Stadium, Tashkent
Attendance: 400
Referee: Yuttakon Maiket (Thailand)

=== Group C ===
Pos	Team	Pld	W	D	L	GF	GA	GD	Pts	Qualification
1	Thailand	3	3	0	0	15	7	+8	9	Knockout stage
2	Vietnam	3	2	0	1	14	8	+6	6	Knockout stage
3	Chinese Taipei	3	0	1	2	9	15	−6	1	
4	Tajikistan	3	0	1	2	8	16	−8	1	

Source: AFC
Rules for classification: Group stage tiebreakers
11 February 2016
16:30

Thailand	5–4	Tajikistan
Suphawut 7', 30', 32'; Apiwat 25'; Wiwat 40'	Report	Alimakhmadov 11'; Mamedbabaev 21'; Sharipov 35', 39'

Universal Stadium, Tashkent
Attendance: 100
Referee: Hasan Mousa Al-Gburi (Iraq)
11 February 2016
19:00

Vietnam	5–4	Chinese Taipei
Nguyễn Bảo Quân 4' (pen.); Phùng Trọng Luân 6'; Lê Quốc Nam 28'; Trần Long Vũ 31'; Ngô Ngọc Sơn 37'	Report	Lin Chih-hung 4', 31'; Chi Sheng-fa 26'; Huang Po-chun 39'

Universal Stadium, Tashkent
Attendance: 100
Referee: Husein Mahmoud Khalaileh (Jordan)

13 February 2016
16:30

Chinese Taipei	2–7	Thailand
Chu Chia-wei 14'; Lai Ming-hui 36'	Report	Suphawut 2', 33'; Konghla 4'; Chang Chien-ying 22' (o.g.); Jetsada 28', 37'; Wiwat 37'

Universal Stadium, Tashkent
Attendance: 100
Referee: Hawkar Salar Ahmed (Iraq)
13 February 2016
19:00

Tajikistan	1–8	Vietnam
Sardorov 9'	Report	Dương Anh Tùng 1', 22'; Trần Văn Vũ 14', 37'; Nguyễn Bảo Quân 20'; Lê Quốc Nam 27'; Trần Long Vũ 34'; Phùng Trọng Luân 35'

Universal Stadium, Tashkent
Attendance: 300
Referee: Khamis Hassan Al Shamsi (United Arab Emirates)

15 February 2016
19:00

Thailand	3–1	Vietnam
Suphawut 32', 40', 40'	Report	Vũ Xuân Du 38'

Uzbekistan Stadium, Tashkent
Attendance: 700
Referee: Hasan Mousa Al-Gburi (Iraq)
15 February 2016
19:00

Chinese Taipei	3–3	Tajikistan
Chu Chia-wei 26'; Lin Chien-hsun 36'; Chang Chien-ying 39'	Report	Alimakhmadov 2'; Halimov 29'; Tillozoda 40'

Universal Stadium, Tashkent
Attendance: 100
Referee: Mahmoud Husein Khalaileh (Jordan)

=== Group D ===
Pos	Team	Pld	W	D	L	GF	GA	GD	Pts	Qualification
1	Japan	3	3	0	0	15	2	+13	9	Knockout stage
2	Australia	3	2	0	1	8	6	+2	6	Knockout stage
3	Qatar	3	1	0	2	8	8	0	3	
4	Malaysia	3	0	0	3	4	19	−15	0	

Source: AFC
Rules for classification: Group stage tiebreakers
11 February 2016
16:30

Japan	1–0	Qatar
Watanabe 16'	Report

Uzbekistan Stadium, Tashkent
Attendance: 430
Referee: Nurdin Bukuev (Kyrgyzstan)
11 February 2016
19:00

Australia	2–1	Malaysia
Basger 24'; G. Giovenali 26'	Report	Khairul 19'

Uzbekistan Stadium, Tashkent
Attendance: 1,000
Referee: Vahid Arzpeyma Mohammreh (Iran)

13 February 2016
16:30

Malaysia	1–11	Japan
Afif 14'	Report	Yoshikawa 3'; Takita 3', 7'; Morioka 13'; Osodo 13'; Watanabe 15'; Henmi 15'; Nishitani 16', 19'; Nibuya 19'; Murota 40'

Uzbekistan Stadium, Tashkent
Attendance: 430
Referee: Liu Jianqiao (China)
13 February 2016
19:00

Qatar	2–5	Australia
Al-Braidi 3'; Lucas 27'	Report	Fogarty 2'; G. Giovenali 3', 26'; Seeto 4', 37'

Uzbekistan Stadium, Tashkent
Attendance: 1,000
Referee: An Ran (China)

15 February 2016
16:30

Japan	3–1	Australia
Henmi 8'; Morioka 19'; Nibuya 34'	Report	G. Giovenali 12'

Uzbekistan Stadium, Tashkent
Attendance: 435
Referee: Nurdin Bukuev (Kyrgyzstan)
15 February 2016
16:30

Malaysia	2–6	Qatar
Akmarul Nizam 2'; Afif 18'	Report	Ali 2'; Bilal 5'; Al-Braidi 9', 26'; Lucas 39', 40'

Universal Stadium, Tashkent
Attendance: 50
Referee: Vahid Arzpeyma (Iran)

== Knockout stage ==
In the knockout stage, extra time and penalty shoot-out would be used to decide the winner if necessary (no extra time would be used in the third place match).

=== Bracket ===
Fifth place
D2	Australia	3
A2	Kyrgyzstan	1
Seventh place
B2	Iraq	8th
D1	Japan	7th

Consolation semifinals
B2	Iraq	3
D2	Australia	5
A2	Kyrgyzstan	6
D1	Japan	2

Quarterfinals
A1	Uzbekistan	3
B2	Iraq	0
C1	Thailand	6
D2	Australia	1
B1	Iran	7
A2	Kyrgyzstan	0
D1	Japan	4 (1)
C2	Vietnam (p)	4 (2)

Semifinals
A1	Uzbekistan (p)	2 (3)
C1	Thailand	2 (1)
B1	Iran	13
C2	Vietnam	1

Final
A1	Uzbekistan	1
B1	Iran	2
Third place
C1	Thailand	8
C2	Vietnam	0

=== Quarter-finals ===
Winners qualified for 2016 FIFA Futsal World Cup. Losers enter fifth place play-offs.

17 February 2016
16:00

Uzbekistan	3–0	Iraq
Rakhmatov 18', 39'; Elibaev 31'	Report

Uzbekistan Stadium, Tashkent
Attendance: 2,600
Referee: Liu Jianqiao (China)

17 February 2016
16:00

Thailand	6–1	Australia
Jirawat 5', 39'; Suphawut 10', 39'; Jetsada 27'; Wiwat 33'	Report	G. Giovenali 20'

Universal Stadium, Tashkent
Attendance: 500
Referee: Tomohiro Kozaki (Japan)

17 February 2016
19:00

Iran	7–0	Kyrgyzstan
Tayyebi 7', 15', 32'; Taheri 8'; Bahadori 26'; Hassanzadeh 26'; Alighadr 29'	Report

Uzbekistan Stadium, Tashkent
Attendance: 700
Referee: Trương Quốc Dũng (Vietnam)

17 February 2016
19:00

Japan	4–4 (a.e.t.)	Vietnam
Nibuya 8', 26'; Morioka 13', 42'	Report	Trần Văn Vũ 14', 39'; Danh Phát 35'; Trần Thái Huy 49'
Penalties
Morioka (penalty missed); Henmi (penalty scored); Nibuya (penalty missed)	1–2	(penalty scored) Nguyễn Bảo Quân; (penalty missed) Dương Anh Tùng; (penalty scored) Phùng Trọng Luân

Universal Stadium, Tashkent
Attendance: 150
Referee: Nurdin Bukuev (Kyrgyzstan)

=== Fifth place play-offs ===
18 February 2016
16:00

Iraq	3–5	Australia
Mustafa 8'; Saif 38'; Salim 39'	Report	Basger 6', 20'; Fogarty 11', 37'; W. Giovenali 35'

Uzbekistan Stadium, Tashkent
Attendance: 230
Referee: Trương Quốc Dũng (Vietnam)

18 February 2016
16:00

Kyrgyzstan	6–2	Japan
Baigazy 10', 30'; Chotbaev 13'; Alimov 24', 36', 40'	Report	Henmi 26'; Hoshi 39'

Universal Stadium, Tashkent
Attendance: 100
Referee: Vahid Arzpeyma Mohamareh (Iran)

=== Fifth place match ===
Australia qualified for 2016 FIFA Futsal World Cup.

19 February 2016
16:00

Australia	3–1	Kyrgyzstan
Merrin 6'; Lynch 20'; G. Giovenali 32'	Report	Kanetov 37'

Universal Stadium, Tashkent
Attendance: 100
Referee: Trương Quốc Dũng (Vietnam)

=== Semi-finals ===
19 February 2016
16:00

Uzbekistan	2–2 (a.e.t.)	Thailand
Jirawat 23' (o.g.); Yunusov 48'	Report	Jetsada 24'; Apiwat 41'
Penalties
Sviridov (penalty scored); Irsaliev (penalty scored); Fakhriddinov (penalty scored)	3–1	(penalty scored) Suphawut; (penalty missed) Jirawat

Uzbekistan Stadium, Tashkent
Attendance: 2,600
Referee: Chris Colley (Australia)

19 February 2016
19:00

Iran	13–1	Vietnam
Javid 2', 20', 32'; Tavakoli 8', 8', 20', 22'; Ahmadi 13'; Tayyebi 16', 27'; Vafaei 26'; Keshavarz 37', 39'	Report	Phùng Trọng Luân 17'

Uzbekistan Stadium, Tashkent
Attendance: 2,000
Referee: Nurdin Bukuev (Kyrgyzstan)

=== Third place match ===
21 February 2016
16:00

Thailand	8–0	Vietnam
Jetsada 6'; Apiwat 11', 12'; Suphawut 18' (pen.), 18' (pen.), 36', 40'; Jirawat 34'	Report

Uzbekistan Stadium, Tashkent
Attendance: 2,000
Referee: An Ran (China)

=== Final ===
21 February 2016
19:00

Uzbekistan	1–2	Iran
Irsaliev 6'	Report	Bahadori 9'; Keshavarz 14'

Uzbekistan Stadium, Tashkent
Attendance: 2,600
Referee: Tomohiro Kozaki (Japan)

== Goalscorers ==
There were 234 goals scored in 35 matches, for an average of 6.69 goals per match.

14 goals

- (Thailand) Suphawut Thueanklang

11 goals

- (Iran) Hossein Tayyebi

8 goals

- (Iran) Mahdi Javid

7 goals

- (Kyrgyzstan) Maksadbek Alimov

6 goals

- (Australia) Gregory Giovenali
- (Iran) Ali Asghar Hassanzadeh

5 goals

- (Iran) Farhad Tavakoli
- (Iran) Mohammad Keshavarz
- (Thailand) Jetsada Chudech

4 goals

- (Iran) Ghodrat Bahadori
- (Iran) Mohammad Taheri
- (Iraq) Waleed Khalid
- (Japan) Kaoru Morioka
- (Japan) Kazuhiro Nibuya
- (Thailand) Apiwat Chaemcharoen
- (Uzbekistan) Dilshod Rakhmatov
- (Vietnam) Trần Văn Vũ

3 goals

- (Australia) Jarrod Basger
- (Australia) Daniel Fogarty
- (Iran) Hamid Ahmadi
- (Iraq) Saif Abdulmalek
- (Japan) Rafael Henmi
- (Kyrgyzstan) Ulanbek Baigazy
- (Qatar) Hadi Al-Braidi
- (Qatar) Lucas Oliveira
- (Saudi Arabia) Essam Atiah
- (Thailand) Jirawat Sornwichian
- (Thailand) Wiwat Thaijaroen
- (Vietnam) Phùng Trọng Luân

2 goals

- (Australia) Tobias Seeto
- (China) Wang Hongwei
- (Chinese Taipei) Chu Chia-wei
- (Chinese Taipei) Lin Chih-hung
- (Iraq) Rafid Hameed
- (Iraq) Salim Faisal
- (Japan) Ryosuke Nishitani
- (Japan) Manabu Takita
- (Japan) Tomoaki Watanabe
- (Jordan) Samer Samih
- (Kyrgyzstan) Ilias Chotbaev
- (Lebanon) Mohamad Kobeissy
- (Lebanon) Ali Tneich
- (Malaysia) Afif Asyraf
- (Tajikistan) Nekruz Alimakhmadov
- (Tajikistan) Rahmonali Sharipov
- (Uzbekistan) Davron Choriev
- (Uzbekistan) Artur Yunusov
- (Vietnam) Dương Anh Tùng
- (Vietnam) Lê Quốc Nam
- (Vietnam) Nguyễn Bảo Quân
- (Vietnam) Trần Long Vũ

1 goal

- (Australia) Wade Giovenali
- (Australia) Grant Lynch
- (Australia) Daine Merrin
- (China) He Yihui
- (China) Li Jianjia
- (China) Zeng Liang
- (China) Zhao Liang
- (Chinese Taipei) Chang Chien-ying
- (Chinese Taipei) Chi Sheng-fa
- (Chinese Taipei) Huang Po-chun
- (Chinese Taipei) Lai Ming-hui
- (Chinese Taipei) Lin Chien-hsun
- (Iran) Mehran Alighadr
- (Iran) Alireza Vafaei
- (Iraq) Hussein Al-Zubaidi
- (Iraq) Amjad Kareem
- (Iraq) Firas Mohammed
- (Iraq) Mustafa Bachay
- (Japan) Shota Hoshi
- (Japan) Yuki Murota
- (Japan) Nobuya Osodo
- (Japan) Tomoki Yoshikawa
- (Jordan) Nooreddin Atef
- (Jordan) Mutaz Mohammad
- (Kyrgyzstan) Ruslan Ermekov
- (Kyrgyzstan) Rustam Ermekov
- (Kyrgyzstan) Emil Kanetov
- (Lebanon) Ahmad Kheir El Dine
- (Lebanon) Hassan Zeitoun
- (Malaysia) Akmarulnizam Idris
- (Malaysia) Khairul Effendy
- (Qatar) Mohamed Ali
- (Qatar) Saad Bilal
- (Saudi Arabia) Abdulaziz Azmi
- (Saudi Arabia) Eihab Nasser
- (Saudi Arabia) Aroan Nawaf
- (Saudi Arabia) Jwher Zafer
- (Tajikistan) Shavqat Halimov
- (Tajikistan) Mansur Mamedbabaev
- (Tajikistan) Fayzali Sardorov
- (Tajikistan) Mehruboni Tillozoda
- (Thailand) Konghla Lakka
- (Uzbekistan) Farkhod Abdumavlyanov
- (Uzbekistan) Javlon Anorov
- (Uzbekistan) Nodir Elibaev
- (Uzbekistan) Dilshod Irsaliev
- (Uzbekistan) Jamoliddin Shalipov
- (Uzbekistan) Konstantin Sviridov
- (Vietnam) Danh Phát
- (Vietnam) Ngô Ngọc Sơn
- (Vietnam) Trần Thái Huy
- (Vietnam) Vũ Xuân Du

1 own goal

- (Chinese Taipei) Chang Chien-ying (against Thailand)
- (Saudi Arabia) Abdulaziz Azmi (against Lebanon)
- (Thailand) Jirawat Sornwichian (against Uzbekistan)

Source: AFC

== Awards ==
- Most Valuable Player: (Iran) Ali Asghar Hassanzadeh
- Top Scorer: (Thailand) Suphawut Thueanklang
- Fair Play Award: Iran

== Final ranking ==
Teams qualified for the 2016 FIFA Futsal World Cup

Rank	Team
1st place, gold medalist(s)	Iran
2nd place, silver medalist(s)	Uzbekistan
3rd place, bronze medalist(s)	Thailand
4	Vietnam
5	Australia
6	Kyrgyzstan
7	Japan
8	Iraq
9	Qatar
10	China
11	Lebanon
12	Saudi Arabia
13	Chinese Taipei
14	Tajikistan
15	Jordan
16	Malaysia

Source: AFC

=== Qualified teams for FIFA Futsal World Cup ===
The following five teams from AFC qualified for the 2016 FIFA Futsal World Cup

Team	Qualified on	Previous appearances in tournament^{1}
Iran	17 February 2016	6 (1992, 1996, 2000, 2004, 2008, 2012)
Uzbekistan	17 February 2016	0 (debut)
Thailand	17 February 2016	4 (2000, 2004, 2008, 2012)
Vietnam	17 February 2016	0 (debut)
Australia	19 February 2016	6 (1989^{2}, 1992^{2}, 1996^{2}, 2000^{2}, 2004^{2}, 2012)

^{1} Bold indicates champion for that year. Italic indicates host for that year.
^{2} Australia qualified as a member of the OFC between 1989 and 2004.

== Broadcasting ==
Territory	Channel	Ref
Asia-Pacific	Fox Sports Asia	
Australia	Fox Sports Australia	
China	Star Sports	
Iran	IRIB 3	
Thailand	Channel 7 (Thailand)	
Uzbekistan	SPORT-UZ	
Kyrgyzstan	KTRK-Sport (Kyrgyzstan)	
