= 2013 GCC Futsal Cup =

Tournament details
- Host country: Qatar
- Dates: 12–28 May
- Teams: 5 (from 1 confederation)
- Venues: 2 (in 1 host city)

Final positions
- Champions: Kuwait (1st title)
- Runners-up: Saudi Arabia
- Third place: Bahrain
- Fourth place: Qatar

Tournament statistics
- Matches played: 10
- Goals scored: 75 (7.5 per match)

The 2013 GCC Futsal Cup (Arabic: كأس الخليج للصالات) was the first edition of the biennial Futsal competition. It took place in Qatar in 2013. The competition was originally scheduled to be hosted in the city of Bahrain, but was moved to Bahrain in October 2012 to ensure that they could suitably host the competition in the 2 edition.

== Tournament ==
The five teams in the tournament played a single round-robin style competition. The team achieving first place in the overall standings was the tournament winner.

Team	Pld	W	D	L	GF	GA	GD	Pts
Kuwait	4	4	0	0	23	9	+14	12
Saudi Arabia	4	2	1	1	15	13	+2	7
Bahrain	4	2	0	2	18	20	-2	6
Qatar	4	1	1	2	14	13	+1	3
United Arab Emirates	4	0	0	4	10	25	-15	0

== Result ==
https://www.goalzz.com/main.aspx?c=9302&stage=1&sch=true

Tuesday 24 September 2013 United Arab Emirates 4 : 6 Bahrain Round # 1

Qatar 3 : 3 Saudi Arabia Round # 1

Wednesday 25 September 2013 Kuwait 8 : 5 Bahrain Round # 2

Saudi Arabia 5 : 3 United Arab Emirates Round # 2

Friday 27 September 2013 Kuwait 4 : 1 Saudi Arabia Round # 3

Qatar 8 : 1 United Arab Emirates Round # 3

Saturday 28 September 2013 Kuwait 6 : 2 United Arab Emirates Round # 4

Qatar 2 : 4 Bahrain Round # 4

Monday 30 September 2013 Bahrain 3 : 6 Saudi Arabia Round # 5

Qatar 1 : 5 Kuwait Round # 5

2013 GCC Futsal Cup winners

Kuwait
First title
