= Oman national futsal team =

- Nickname(s): Al-Ahmar (The Reds)
- Association: Oman Football Association
- Confederation: AFC (Asia)
- FIFA code: OMN
- FIFA ranking: 91 ▲1 (24 September 2026)
Home colours	Away colours

First international
- Oman 12–3 Kuwait (Hong Kong; 1 May 1992)

Biggest win
- Oman 12–3 Kuwait (Hong Kong; 1 May 1992)

Biggest defeat
- Kuwait 5–0 Oman (Isa Town, Bahrain; 17 March 2015)

AFC Futsal Championship
- Appearances: 1 (First in 2022)
- Best result: Group Stage (2022)

The Oman national futsal team is controlled by the Oman Football Association, the governing body for futsal in Oman and represents the country in international futsal competitions.

== Tournaments ==
=== FIFA Futsal World Cup ===
- 1989 – Did not enter
- 1992 – Did not qualify
- 1996-2016 – Did not enter
- 2021 – Did not qualify
- 2024 – Did not enter

=== AFC Futsal Championship ===
AFC Futsal Championship record
Year	Round	Rank	Pld	W	D	L	GS	GA	GD
(Malaysia) 1999	Did Not Enter								
(Thailand) 2000	Did Not Enter								
(Iran) 2001	Did Not Enter								
(Indonesia) 2002	Did Not Enter								
(Iran) 2003	Did Not Enter								
(Macau) 2004	Did Not Enter								
(Vietnam) 2005	Did Not Enter								
(Uzbekistan) 2006	Did Not Enter								
(Japan) 2007	Did Not Enter								
(Thailand) 2008	Did Not Enter								
(Uzbekistan) 2010	Did Not Enter								
(United Arab Emirates) 2012	Did Not Enter								
(Vietnam) 2014	Did Not Enter								
(Uzbekistan) 2016	Did Not Enter								
(Taiwan) 2018	Did Not Enter								
(Turkmenistan) 2020	Cancelled, qualified though								
(Kuwait) 2022	Group Stage	16th	3	0	0	3	3	18	-15
(Thailand) 2024	did not enter								
Total	1/16	0	0	0	0	0	0	0	0

=== Arab Futsal Championship ===
Arab Futsal Championship record
Year	Round	Pld	W	D	L	GS	GA	DIF
(Egypt) 1998	Did not enter							
(Libya) 2005	Did not enter							
(Egypt) 2007	Did not enter							
(Egypt) 2008	Did not enter							
(Egypt) 2021	Did not enter							
Total	0/5	0	0	0	0	0	0	0

=== GCC Futsal Cup ===
GCC Futsal Cup record
Year	Round	Pld	W	D	L	GS	GA	DIF
(Qatar) 2013	Did not enter							
(Bahrain) 2015	4th Place	7	2	0	5	15	24	-9
Total	1/2	7	2	0	5	15	24	-9
