= Ahmad Kheir El Dine =

Lebanese footballer (born 1995)

- Kheir El Dine with Lebanon in 2024

Personal information
- Full name: Ahmad Hussein Kheir El Dine
- Date of birth: 7 July 1995 (age 31)
- Place of birth: Kfar Melki, Lebanon
- Height: 1.86 m (6 ft 1 in)
- Position: Midfielder

Team information
- Current team: Ansar
- Number: 12

Senior career*
Years	Team	Apps	(Gls)
2014–2019	Bank of Beirut (futsal)		
2019–2020	Naft Al-Junoob (futsal)		
2020–2022	Hurriya Saida (futsal)		
2022–2024	Nejmeh	36	(0)
2024–	Ansar	50	(0)

International career^{‡}
2014–2024	Lebanon (futsal)		(10)
2024–	Lebanon	17	(0)
- * Club domestic league appearances and goals as of 09:41, 3 August 2026 (UTC) ‡ National team caps and goals as of 17 November 2026

Ahmad Hussein Kheir El Dine (Arabic: أحمد حسين خير الدين; born 7 July 1995) is a Lebanese football and futsal player who plays as a midfielder for Lebanese Premier League club Ansar and the Lebanon national team.

== Club career ==
=== Futsal ===
Kheir El Dine was nominated in the All-Star Team of the 2018 AFC Futsal Club Championship with Bank of Beirut. In 2019, he joined Iraqi club Naft Al-Junoob. In 2021, Kheir El Dine returned to Lebanon and joined Hurriya Saida, with whom he played until 2022.

=== Nejmeh ===
In August 2022, after having played 10 years in futsal, Kheir El Dine made the change to football and signed for Lebanese Premier League club Nejmeh on a two-year deal. Kheir El Dine cited the lack of financial support for futsal in Lebanon as the main reason for the switch. He was one of a number of futsal players to switch to football and eventually join Nejmeh, including Khaled Takaji, Ali Tneich, Edmond Chehade, and Hassan Chaito. He won the league title with Nejmeh in 2023–24.

=== Ansar ===
On 11 July 2024, Kheir El Dine signed for cross-city rivals Ansar on a three-year contract. He won the 2024–25 and 2025–26 league titles with Ansar, and was crowned league champion for three consecutive times.

== International career ==
=== Futsal ===
Kheir El Dine has played for the Lebanon national futsal team since 2014, taking part in the AFC Futsal Asian Cup in 2014, 2016, 2018, 2020, and 2024. He also played for Lebanon in the 2021 FIFA Futsal World Cup qualification play-off game against Vietnam.

=== Football ===
Kheir El Dine was first called up to the Lebanon national football team in May 2024, ahead of two 2026 FIFA World Cup qualifiers against Palestine and Bangladesh in June. He made his debut on 4 September 2024, as a starter in the semi-final of the 2024 Merdeka Tournament, contributing to a 1–0 victory against Tajikistan.

== Personal life ==
Kheir El Dine got married in October 2022.

== Career statistics ==
=== Club ===
As of match played 8 March 2025

Appearances and goals by club, season and competition
Club	Season	League			FA Cup		Federation Cup		AFC Cup		Other		Total	
Club	Season	Division	Apps	Goals	Apps	Goals	Apps	Goals	Apps	Goals	Apps	Goals	Apps	Goals
Nejmeh	2022–23	Lebanese Premier League	14	0	1	0	—		—		—		15	0
Nejmeh	2023–24	Lebanese Premier League	22	0	2	0	2	0	4	0	—		30	0
Nejmeh	Total		36	0	3	0	2	0	4	0	0	0	45	0
Ansar	2024–25	Lebanese Premier League	9	0	0	0	—		—		1 (Note: Appearance in Lebanese Super Cup)	0	10	0
Career total			45	0	3	0	2	0	4	0	1	0	55	0

=== International ===
As of match played 17 November 2026

Appearances and goals by national team and year
National team	Year	Apps	Goals
Lebanon	2024	4	0
Lebanon	2025	9	0
Lebanon	2026	4	0
Total		17	0

== Honours ==
Bank of Beirut (futsal)

- Lebanese Futsal League: 2013–14, 2014–15, 2016–17, 2017–18, 2018–19

Hurriya Saida (futsal)

- Lebanese Futsal League: 2020–21

Nejmeh

- Lebanese Premier League: 2023–24
- Lebanese FA Cup: 2022–23
- Lebanese Super Cup: 2023

Ansar

- Lebanese Premier League: 2024–25, 2025–26
