= Kuwait national futsal team =

Futsal team

Kuwait
- Nickname(s): Al-Azraq (The Blue)
- Association: Kuwait Football Association
- Confederation: AFC (Asia)
- Head coach: Mohammad Nazemasharieh
- Top scorer: Abdulrahman Al Mosibaeh
- Home stadium: Daiya Futsal National Stadium
- FIFA code: KUW
- FIFA ranking: 43 ▼3 (8 May 2026)
Home colours	Away colours

First international
- Kuwait 3–12 Oman (Iran; 1 May 1992)

Biggest win
- Kuwait 20–0 Maldives (Macau, Macau; 16 April 2004)

Biggest defeat
- Iran 18–2 Kuwait (Tehran, Iran; 18 July 2001)

FIFA World Cup
- Appearances: 1 (First in 2012)
- Best result: Group stage (2012)

AFC Futsal Championship
- Appearances: 13 (First in 2001)
- Best result: 4th place (2003 and 2014)

WAFF Futsal Championship
- Appearances: 2 (First in 2012)
- Best result: Champions (2022)

Confederations Cup
- Appearances: 1 (First in 2014)
- Best result: 7th place (2014)

Grand Prix de Futsal
- Appearances: 0

The Kuwait national futsal team represents Kuwait in international futsal competitions and is controlled by the Kuwait Football Association.

== Coaches ==
- Hossein Shams (2003–2006)
- Ricardo Sobral (2018–2022)

== Tournaments ==
=== FIFA Futsal World Cup ===
FIFA World Cup Record
Year	Round	M	W	D	L	GF	GA
(Netherlands) 1989	did not enter						
(British Hong Kong) 1992	did not enter						
(Spain) 1996	did not enter						
(Guatemala) 2000	did not enter						
(Taiwan) 2004	did not enter						
(Brazil) 2008	did not enter						
(Thailand) 2012	Round 1	3	1	0	2	8	13
(Colombia) 2016	Disqualified						
(Lithuania) 2020	Disqualified						
(Uzbekistan) 2024	Did not qualify						
Total	1/10	3	1	0	2	8	13

=== Asian Indoor and Martial Arts Games ===
Asian Indoor and Martial Arts Games record
Year	Round	M	W	D	L	GF	GA	GD
(Thailand) 2005	Quarter-finals	2	0	0	2	0	8	−8
(Macau) 2007	First Round/Disqualified	4	0	0	4	0	12	−12
(Vietnam) 2009	Quarter-finals	3	1	0	2	9	16	−7
(South Korea) 2013	Fourth place	6	4	0	2	28	21	+7
(Turkmenistan) 2017	did not enter							
Total	4/5	15	5	0	10	37	55	−18

=== AFC Futsal Asian Cup ===
AFC Futsal Asian Cup									Qualification							
Year	Round	M	W	D	L	GF	GA	GD	M	W	D	L	GF	GA	GD	Link
(Malaysia) 1999	did not enter								No qualification							
(Thailand) 2000	did not enter								No qualification							
(Iran) 2001	Quarter-finals	5	2	0	3	14	32	-18	No qualification							
(Indonesia) 2002	Quarter-finals	5	2	1	2	26	14	+12	No qualification							
(Iran) 2003	Fourth place	6	2	1	3	28	32	-4	No qualification							
(Macau) 2004	Quarter-finals	4	2	0	2	31	16	+15	No qualification							
(Vietnam) 2005	Second round	6	3	0	3	27	19	+8	No qualification							
(Uzbekistan) 2006	Group stage	3	0	1	2	9	14	-5								
(Japan) 2007	Group stage	3	1	0	2	5	14	-9								
(Thailand) 2008	Group stage	3	0	0	3	4	27	-23								
(Uzbekistan) 2010	Group stage	3	0	0	3	5	15	-10								
(United Arab Emirates) 2012	Quarter-finals	4	2	1	1	17	7	+10								
(Vietnam) 2014	Fourth place	6	3	0	3	18	15	+3								
(Uzbekistan) 2016	Disqualified															
(Taiwan) 2018	Suspended by FIFA															
(Kuwait) 2020	Cancelled															
(Kuwait) 2022	Quarter-finals	4	1	2	1	11	9	+2								
(Thailand) 2024	Group stage	3	1	1	1	5	8	-3								
(Indonesia) 2026	Group stage	3	1	0	2	12	13	-1								
Total:14/18	Fourth place	58	20	7	31	212	235	-23								

* = At the first qualified because of top 4 in 2014 competition, but later could not participate due to FIFA's suspension of the Kuwait Football Association.

**= Could not participate in West Zone qualifier due to FIFA's suspension of the Kuwait Football Association was still in effect.

=== West Asian Championship ===
West Asian Championship record
Year	Round	Pld	W	D*	L	GS	GA	DIF
(Iran) 2007	did not enter							
(Jordan) 2009	did not enter							
(Iran) 2012	Fourth place	4	1	1	2	14	21	−7
(Kuwait) 2022	Champions	5	4	1	0	23	13	+10
Total	2/4	9	5	2	2	37	34	+3

=== Confederations Cup ===
Confederations Cup record
Year	Round	Pld	W	D*	L	GS	GA	DIF
(Libya) 2009	did not enter							
(Brazil) 2013	did not enter							
(Kuwait) 2014	First round	3	0	0	3	6	15	−9
Total	1/3	3	0	0	3	6	15	−9

*Denotes draws includes knockout matches decided on penalty shootouts. Red border indicates that the tournament was hosted on home soil. Gold, silver, bronze backgrounds indicates 1st, 2nd and 3rd finishes respectively.

== Summary Results ==
As of 30 March 2024

Year	M	W	D	L	GF	GA	GD	Ref
1995	0	0	0	0	0	0	0	
1996	0	0	0	0	0	0	0	
1997	0	0	0	0	0	0	0	
1998	0	0	0	0	0	0	0	
1999	0	0	0	0	0	0	0	
2000	0	0	0	0	0	0	0	
2001	0	0	0	0	0	0	0	
2002	0	0	0	0	0	0	0	
2003	0	0	0	0	0	0	0	
2004	0	0	0	0	0	0	0	
2005	0	0	0	0	0	0	0	
2006	0	0	0	0	0	0	0	
2007	0	0	0	0	0	0	0	
2008	0	0	0	0	0	0	0	
2009	0	0	0	0	0	0	0	
2010	0	0	0	0	0	0	0	
2011	0	0	0	0	0	0	0	
2012	0	0	0	0	0	0	0	
2013	0	0	0	0	0	0	0	
2014	0	0	0	0	0	0	0	
2015	0	0	0	0	0	0	0	
2016	0	0	0	0	0	0	0	
2017	0	0	0	0	0	0	0	
2018	0	0	0	0	0	0	0	
2019	0	0	0	0	0	0	0	
2020	0	0	0	0	0	0	0	
2021	0	0	0	0	0	0	0	
2022	0	0	0	0	0	0	0	
2023	0	0	0	0	0	0	0	
2024	0	0	0	0	0	0	0	
Total	0	0	0	0	0	0	+0	

== Honours ==
- GCC Futsal Cup: 2
  - 2013, 2015
- WAFF Futsal Championship: 1
  - 2022
- GCC Games: 1
  - Gold: 2022

=== Minor/Friendly ===
- Croatia Winter International:1
  - 2018
