= Wiwat Thaijaroen =

Thai futsal player

Personal information
- Full name: Wiwat Thaijaroen
- Date of birth: 31 December 1990 (age 35)
- Place of birth: Bangkok, Thailand
- Height: 1.63 m (5 ft 4 in)
- Position: Winger

Team information
- Current team: Department of Highways Futsal Club

Senior career*
Years	Team	Apps	(Gls)
2013–2015	CAT Telecom Futsal Club		
2016–	Department of Highways Futsal Club		

International career
2014–	Thailand Futsal		
- * Club domestic league appearances and goals

Wiwat Thaijaroen (Thai วิวัฒน์ ไทยเจริญ), is a Thai futsal Winger, and a member of Thailand national futsal team. He plays for Department of Highways Futsal Club in Futsal Thailand League.
