= Lucas Oliveira (footballer, born 1995) =

Brazilian footballer

Personal information
- Full name: Lucas Dias Pires de Oliveira
- Date of birth: 27 June 1995 (age 31)
- Place of birth: Anápolis, Brazil
- Height: 1.80 m (5 ft 11 in)
- Position: Winger

Youth career
- 2009–2014: Sporting Covilhã
- 2015: Paraná

Senior career*
Years	Team	Apps	(Gls)
2013–2014	Sporting Covilhã	4	(0)
2015	Osvaldo Cruz FC	4	(3)
2016–2017	Tupã	6	(1)
2017	Aiginiakos		
- * Club domestic league appearances and goals as of 25 September 2016

Lucas Dias Pires de Oliveira (born 27 June 1995) is a Brazilian professional footballer who plays as a winger.

== Career ==
On 4 August 2013, Lucas made his professional debut with Sporting Covilhã in a 2013–14 Taça da Liga match against UD Oliveirense.
