= Ali Tneich =

Lebanese footballer (born 1992)

- Tneich with Lebanon in 2024

Personal information
- Full name: Ali Samir Tneich
- Date of birth: 16 July 1992 (age 34)
- Place of birth: Jwaya, Lebanon
- Height: 1.78 m (5 ft 10 in)
- Position: Midfielder

Team information
- Current team: Ansar
- Number: 20

Senior career*
Years	Team	Apps	(Gls)
2011–2012	All Sports (futsal)		
2012–2013	Salam Zgharta		
2013–2020	Bank of Beirut (futsal)		
2016	→ Mayadeen (loan; futsal)		
2020–2021	Nejmeh	16	(1)
2021–	Ansar	113	(24)

International career^{‡}
2012–2021	Lebanon (futsal)		(23)
2022–	Lebanon	31	(1)
- * Club domestic league appearances and goals as of 09:38, 3 August 2026 (UTC) ‡ National team caps and goals as of 14 October 2025

Ali Samir Tneich (Arabic: علي سمير طنيش; born 16 July 1992), also known as Sisi (Arabic: السيسي), is a Lebanese footballer and former futsal player who plays as a midfielder for Lebanese Premier League club Ansar, whom he captains, and the Lebanon national team.

== Club career ==
Tneich played for Salam Zgharta in the Lebanese Second Division, helping them finish second in the 2012–13 season and gain promotion to the Lebanese Premier League.

Following a career as a futsal player, Tneich returned to football, joining Nejmeh ahead of the 2020–21 Lebanese Premier League season. On 13 December 2020, Tneich scored a long-distance goal against rivals Ansar, in a Beirut derby encounter in the league, to help Nejmeh win 2–1. The goal was noted as arguably one of the best in the derby. Tneich finished the season with one goal in 16 league games for Nejmeh. Tneich was regarded as the best midfielder of the season according to Tadamon Sour head coach Mohammed Zouheir.

The following season, on 30 June 2021, Tneich transferred to Ansar in a free transfer, on a two-year contract. Despite interest from Lebanese champions Ahed in 2023, Tneich extended his contract with Ansar a further three years.

== International career ==
Tneich made his debut for the Lebanon national team on 30 December 2022, in a friendly game against the United Arab Emirates. His first goal came on 12 October 2023, scoring in a 3–2 friendly defeat to Montenegro.

In December 2023, Tneich was included in the Lebanese squad for the 2023 AFC Asian Cup.

== Career statistics ==
=== International ===
As of match played 14 October 2025

Appearances and goals by national team and year
National team	Year	Apps	Goals
Lebanon	2022	1	0
Lebanon	2023	14	1
Lebanon	2024	10	0
Lebanon	2025	6	0
Total		31	1

Scores and results list Lebanon's goal tally first, score column indicates score after each Tneich goal.

List of international goals scored by Ali Tneich
No.	Date	Venue	Opponent	Score	Result	Competition
1	12 November 2023	Podgorica City Stadium, Podgorica, Montenegro	Montenegro	2–3	2–3	Friendly

== Honours ==
Salam Zgharta

- Lebanese Second Division: 2012–13 (group A)

Bank of Beirut (futsal)

- Lebanese Futsal League: 2013–14, 2014–15, 2016–17, 2017–18, 2018–19
- Lebanese Futsal Cup: 2014–15, 2015–16, 2017–18, 2018–19
- Lebanese Futsal Super Cup: 2014, 2017, 2018

Ansar

- Lebanese Premier League: 2024–25, 2025–26
- Lebanese FA Cup: 2023–24
- Lebanese Super Cup: 2021
