= United Arab Emirates national futsal team =

Futsal team

United Arab Emirates
- Association: UAEFA
- Confederation: AFC
- FIFA code: UAE
- FIFA ranking: 101 ▲2 (12 December 2025)
- Highest FIFA ranking: 75 (10 August 2015)
- Lowest FIFA ranking: 96 (13 July 2016)

First international
- United Arab Emirates 4–8 Belarus (Abu Dhabi; 17 February 1995)

Biggest win
- United Arab Emirates 8–2 Malta (Paola, Malta; 7 September 2011)

Biggest defeat
- Iran 13–0 United Arab Emirates (Incheon, South Korea; 27 June 2013)

The United Arab Emirates national futsal team represents United Arab Emirates in futsal.

== Tournament ==
=== World Cup ===
- 1989 – Did not enter
- 1992 – Did not enter
- 1996 – Did not enter
- 2000 – Did not enter
- 2004 – Did not enter
- 2008 – Did not enter
- 2012 – Did not qualify
- 2016 – Did not qualify
- 2021 – Did not qualify
- 2024 – Did not qualify

=== Asian Cup ===
Final											Qualification					
Year	Round	Rank	Pld	W	D	L	GS	GA	GD		GP	W	D	L	GF	GA
(Malaysia) 1999	Did not enter										Did not enter					
(Thailand) 2000	Did not enter										Did not enter					
(Iran) 2001	Did not enter										Did not enter					
(Indonesia) 2002	Did not enter										Did not enter					
(Iran) 2003	Did not enter										Did not enter					
(Macau) 2004	Did not enter										Did not enter					
(Vietnam) 2005	Did not enter										Did not enter					
(Uzbekistan) 2006	Did not enter										Did not enter					
(Japan) 2007	Did not enter										Did not enter					
(Thailand) 2008	Did not enter										Did not enter					
(Uzbekistan) 2010	Did not enter										Did not enter					
(United Arab Emirates) 2012	Round 1	9th	3	1	0	2	6	8	–2		Automatic qualification					
(Vietnam) 2014	Did not enter										Did not enter					
(Uzbekistan) 2016	Did not qualify										2	0	0	2	2	5
(Taiwan) 2018	Did not qualify										3	0	1	2	2	7
(Turkmenistan) 2020	Did not qualify										5	2	1	2	13	18
(Kuwait) 2022	Did not qualify										2	0	0	2	0	3
(Thailand) 2024	Did not qualify									3	0	0	3	3	8	
(Indonesia) 2026	Did not qualify									3	1	0	2	8	13	
Total			3	1	0	2	6	8	–2	18	3	3	13	28	53	
