= 2001 AFC Futsal Championship =

فوتسال قهرمانی ۲۰۰۱ آسیا

Tournament details
- Host country: Iran
- Dates: 14–20 July
- Teams: 14 (from 1 confederation)
- Venue: 1 (in 1 host city)

Final positions
- Champions: Iran (3rd title)
- Runners-up: Uzbekistan
- Third place: South Korea
- Fourth place: Japan

Tournament statistics
- Matches played: 34
- Goals scored: 328 (9.65 per match)
- Top scorer: (Iran) Vahid Shamsaei (31 goals)

The 2001 AFC Futsal Championship was held in Tehran, Iran from 14 to 20 July 2001.

== Venue ==
Tehran
Azadi Indoor Stadium
Capacity: 12,000
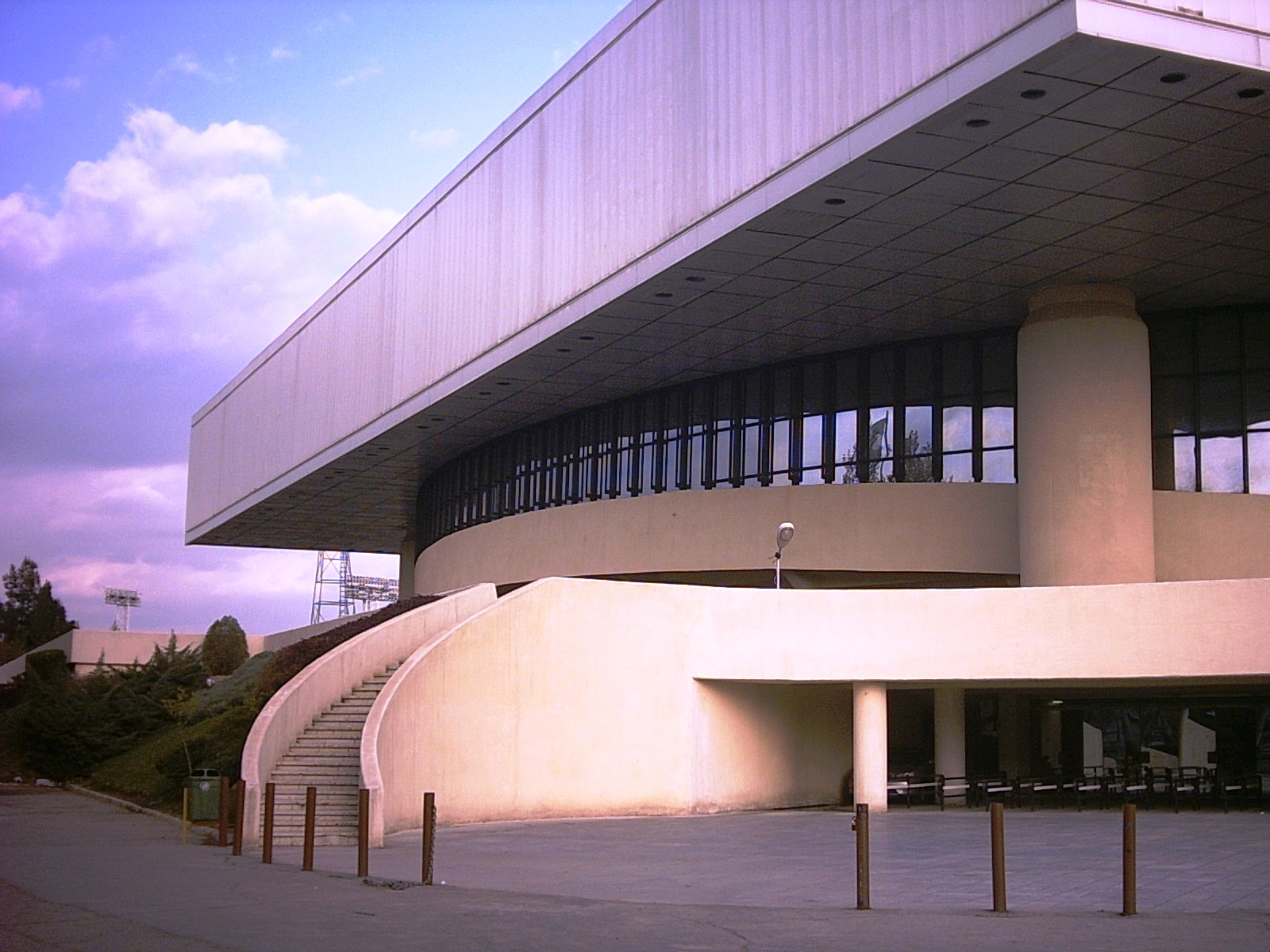

== Draw ==
Group A	Group B	Group C
Iran; Japan; Singapore; Chinese Taipei; Palestine	Kazakhstan; Uzbekistan; Malaysia; Kuwait; Tajikistan	Thailand; South Korea; Kyrgyzstan; Iraq

== Group stage ==
=== Group A ===
Team	Pld	W	D	L	GF	GA	GD	Pts
Iran	4	4	0	0	62	9	+53	12
Palestine	4	3	0	1	22	23	−1	9
Japan	4	2	0	2	20	17	+3	6
Chinese Taipei	4	1	0	3	16	25	−9	3
Singapore	4	0	0	4	6	52	−46	0

14 July 2001
8:00

Iran	16–4	Palestine

Azadi Indoor Stadium, Tehran

14 July 2001
10:00

Chinese Taipei	7–3	Singapore

Azadi Indoor Stadium, Tehran

14 July 2001
20:00

Palestine	6–3	Chinese Taipei

Azadi Indoor Stadium, Tehran

15 July 2001
8:00

Japan	6–5	Chinese Taipei

Azadi Indoor Stadium, Tehran

15 July 2001
12:00

Iran	28–0	Singapore

Azadi Indoor Stadium, Tehran

15 July 2001
20:00

Singapore	1–8	Japan

Azadi Indoor Stadium, Tehran

16 July 2001
7:30

Palestine	3–2	Japan

Azadi Indoor Stadium, Tehran

16 July 2001
9:15

Iran	10–1	Chinese Taipei

Azadi Indoor Stadium, Tehran

16 July 2001
18:00

Japan	4–8	Iran

Azadi Indoor Stadium, Tehran

16 July 2001
21:30

Singapore	2–9	Palestine

Azadi Indoor Stadium, Tehran

=== Group B ===
Team	Pld	W	D	L	GF	GA	GD	Pts
Kazakhstan	4	3	1	0	22	6	+16	10
Uzbekistan	4	3	1	0	22	10	+12	10
Kuwait	4	2	0	2	12	14	−2	6
Tajikistan	4	1	0	3	16	26	−10	3
Malaysia	4	0	0	4	11	27	−16	0

14 July 2001
12:00

Kazakhstan	4–0	Kuwait

Azadi Indoor Stadium, Tehran

14 July 2001
14:00

Tajikistan	9–1	Malaysia

Azadi Indoor Stadium, Tehran

14 July 2001
22:00

Kuwait	6–4	Tajikistan

Azadi Indoor Stadium, Tehran

15 July 2001
10:00

Uzbekistan	7–1	Tajikistan

Azadi Indoor Stadium, Tehran

15 July 2001
14:00

Kazakhstan	4–2	Malaysia

Azadi Indoor Stadium, Tehran

15 July 2001
22:00

Malaysia	5–10	Uzbekistan

Azadi Indoor Stadium, Tehran

16 July 2001
11:00

Kuwait	2–3	Uzbekistan

Azadi Indoor Stadium, Tehran

16 July 2001
12:45

Kazakhstan	12–2	Tajikistan

Azadi Indoor Stadium, Tehran

16 July 2001
19:45

Uzbekistan	2–2	Kazakhstan

Azadi Indoor Stadium, Tehran

16 July 2001
23:15

Malaysia	3–4	Kuwait

Azadi Indoor Stadium, Tehran

=== Group C ===
Team	Pld	W	D	L	GF	GA	GD	Pts
Thailand	3	2	0	1	21	10	+11	6
South Korea	3	2	0	1	15	15	0	6
Kyrgyzstan	3	1	1	1	13	16	−3	4
Iraq	3	0	1	2	8	16	−8	1

14 July 2001
16:00

Thailand	3–4	Kyrgyzstan

Azadi Indoor Stadium, Tehran

14 July 2001
18:00

Iraq	1–3	South Korea

Azadi Indoor Stadium, Tehran

15 July 2001
16:00

Kyrgyzstan	5–5	Iraq

Azadi Indoor Stadium, Tehran

15 July 2001
18:00

South Korea	4–10	Thailand

Azadi Indoor Stadium, Tehran

16 July 2001
14:30

Iraq	2–8	Thailand

Azadi Indoor Stadium, Tehran

16 July 2001
16:15

Kyrgyzstan	4–8	South Korea

Azadi Indoor Stadium, Tehran

=== Third placed teams ===
Team	Pld	W	D	L	GF	GA	GD	Pts
Japan	4	2	0	2	20	17	+3	6
Kuwait	4	2	0	2	12	14	−2	6
Kyrgyzstan	3	1	1	1	13	16	−3	4

== Knockout stage ==
Quarter-finals
July 18 – Tehran
Iran	18
Kuwait	2
July 18 – Tehran
Kazakhstan	2 (6)
Japan (p)	2 (7)
July 18 – Tehran
Thailand	3
Uzbekistan (aet)	4
July 18 – Tehran
Palestine	2
South Korea	3

Semi-finals
July 20 – Tehran
Iran	8
Japan	2
July 20 – Tehran
Uzbekistan	4
South Korea	0

Final
July 20 – Tehran
Iran	9
Uzbekistan	0
Third place
July 20 – Tehran
Japan	1
South Korea	2

=== Quarter-finals ===
18 July 2001
13:00

Iran	18–2	Kuwait

Azadi Indoor Stadium, Tehran

18 July 2001
15:00

Kazakhstan	2–2 (a.e.t.)	Japan
Penalties
	6–7

Azadi Indoor Stadium, Tehran

18 July 2001
17:00

Thailand	3–4 (a.e.t.)	Uzbekistan

Azadi Indoor Stadium, Tehran

18 July 2001
19:00

Palestine	2–3	South Korea

Azadi Indoor Stadium, Tehran

=== Semi-finals ===
20 July 2001
09:00

Iran	8–2	Japan

Azadi Indoor Stadium, Tehran

20 July 2001
13:00

Uzbekistan	4–0	South Korea

Azadi Indoor Stadium, Tehran

=== Third place play-off ===
20 July 2001
18:00

Japan	1–2	South Korea

Azadi Indoor Stadium, Tehran

=== Final ===
20 July 2001
20:00

Iran	9–0	Uzbekistan
Saneei; Dadashi; Hashemzadeh; Heidarian; Pariazar; Shamsaei

Azadi Indoor Stadium, Tehran
Attendance: 12,000

== Awards ==
AFC Futsal Championship 2001 winners

Iran
3rd title

Amir Farrashi, Mansour Molaei, Reza Nasseri, Mohammad Reza Heidarian, Ali Saneei, Mohammad Hashemzadeh, Ahmad Pariazar, Kazem Mohammadi, Majid Raeisi, Hamid Shandizi, Vahid Shamsaei, Siamak Dadashi, Mojtaba Moeini, Majid Molazem
Coach: (Netherlands) Victor Hermans

- Top Scorer
  - (Iran) Vahid Shamsaei (31 goals)
