= 2026 Futsal Africa Cup of Nations =

Tournament details
- Host country: Morocco
- City: Rabat
- Dates: 12–21 October
- Teams: 8 (from 1 confederation)
- Venues: 2 (in 1 host city)

Final positions
- Champions: Morocco (4th title)
- Runners-up: Angola
- Third place: Egypt
- Fourth place: Algeria

Tournament statistics
- Matches played: 16
- Goals scored: 97 (6.06 per match)
- Top scorer(s): (Angola) João Cambangula (8 goals)
- Best player: (Morocco) Youssef Jouad
- Best goalkeeper: (Morocco) Youssef Bensellam
- Fair play award: Morocco

The 2026 Futsal Africa Cup of Nations, commonly referred to as CAF Futsal AFCON 2026, will be the ninth edition of the Futsal Africa Cup of Nations, the biennial international futsal championship organised by CAF for the men's national teams of Africa.

This will be the first edition of the tournament to be staged on a biennial basis, following its previous quadrennial format. It will be hosted by Morocco for the third time in a row.

Morocco are three-time defending champions after previously winning in 2016, 2020 and 2024.

== Qualification ==
A record total of 18 teams registered to take part in the qualifying rounds. The eight lowest-ranked teams competed in the first round, with the four winners advancing to join the remaining ten teams in the second round. The winners of the seven ties then qualified to join the automatically qualified hosts and defending champions Morocco.

Of the eight teams, only five had previously participated in 2024. Algeria and Tanzania qualified for the first time, on their third and second attempts respectively. The only returning team was Mozambique, whose last appearance came in 2020, marking its fifth overall appearance.

Last edition debutants Mauritania and Namibia failed to qualify for a second appearance, while Ghana, who returned to the continental stage after a 28-year absence at the previous edition, also failed to secure back-to-back tournament qualifications.

=== Qualified teams ===
The following 8 teams qualified for the final tournament.

Team	Qualification method	Date of qualification	Appearance(s)				Previous best performance (Note: Bold text indicates they hosted that edition.)	WR (Note: World ranking at start of tournament)
Team	Qualification method	Date of qualification	Total	First	Last	Streak	Previous best performance	WR
Morocco	Host nation	5 January 2026	7th	2000	2024	7	Champions (2016, 2020, 2024)	6th
Tanzania	Second round winners	7 February 2026	1st	Debut				136th
Zambia	Second round winners	8 February 2026	4th	2008	2024	2	Fourth place (2016)	92th
Mozambique	Second round winners	8 February 2026	5th	2004	2020	1	Runners-up (2004)	85th
Algeria	Second round winners	8 February 2026	1st	Debut				100th
Egypt	Second round winners	8 February 2026	8th	1996	2024	8	Champions (1996, 2000, 2004)	39th
Libya	Second round winners	8 February 2026	6th	2000	2024	5	Champions (2008)	50th
Angola	Second round winners	9 February 2026	5th	2008	2024	5	Runners-up (2024)	59th

== Draw ==
The official draw ceremony took place in Rabat, Morocco, on August 10, 2026.

=== Draw Pot ===
This draw has been conducted based on the latest FIFA Men's Futsal World Ranking.

Pot 1	Pot 2	Pot 3	Pot 4
Morocco (6); Egypt (40)	Libya (53); Angola (54)	Mozambique (78); Zambia (86)	Algeria (89); Tanzania (134)

=== Draw Result ===
Group A
Pos	Team
A1	Morocco
A2	Libya
A3	Zambia
A4	Algeria

Group B
Pos	Team
B1	Egypt
B2	Angola
B3	Mozambique
B4	Tanzania

== Group stage ==
The group winners and runners-up will advance to the semi-finals.

=== Group A ===
Pos	Team	Pld	W	D	L	GF	GA	GD	Pts	Qualification
1	Morocco (H)	3	3	0	0	17	0	+17	9	Knockout stage
2	Algeria	3	1	1	1	9	10	−1	4	Knockout stage
3	Zambia	3	1	0	2	7	15	−8	3	
4	Libya	3	0	1	2	3	11	−8	1	

Source: CAF
Rules for classification: Tiebreakers
(H) Hosts
12 October 2026
17:00

Libya	1–3	Zambia
Abu-Raas 39'37"	Report	Chishala 1'14"; Mwila 5'35", 22'37"

Salle Moulay Abdellah, Rabat
Referee: Abdelakram El Hentati (Tunisia), Elhadji Diem (Senegal)
12 October 2026
20:00

Morocco	4–0	Algeria
M'kasri 9'04"; Jouad 11'02", 25'57", 31'40"	Report

Salle Moulay Abdellah, Rabat
Referee: Nabil Gueddich (Tunisia), Ahmed El-Abbasi (Egypt)

14 October 2026
17:00

Algeria	2–2	Libya
S. Si-Chaib 33'34"; Teffaf 38'42"	Report	Lemhammel 11'11"; Rashid 28'05"

Salle Moulay Abdellah, Rabat
Referee: Ahmed El-Abbasi (Egypt), Nabil Gueddich (Tunisia)
14 October 2026
20:00

Morocco	7–0	Zambia
Raiss El Fenni 2'25", 3'01", 8'52", 20'50"; Erraddaf 11'02"; Charraoui 37'29"; Jouad 39'53"	Report

Salle Moulay Abdellah, Rabat
Referee: Abdelakram El Hentati (Tunisia), To be confirmed (TBC)

16 October 2026
20:00

Morocco	6–0	Libya
El Mesrar 2'05", 7'05", 23'32"; El-Idrissi 11'36", 29'18"; Bakkali 29'32"	Report

Salle Moulay Abdellah, Rabat
Referee: Nabil Gueddich (Tunisia), Tchitcha Cazanga (Angola)
16 October 2026
20:00

Zambia	4–7	Algeria
Chiwaya 17'28", 17'34"; Chileshe 30'53", 35'58"	Report	Betterki 4'53", 10'44", 31'17"; Aït Hamadouche 9'50"; Haddad 12'08"; Hammad 31'41", 36'09"

Salle Ibn Yassine, Rabat
Referee: Éric Elingui (Cameroon), Ahmed El-Abbasi (Egypt)

=== Group B ===
Pos	Team	Pld	W	D	L	GF	GA	GD	Pts	Qualification
1	Angola	3	3	0	0	15	3	+12	9	Knockout stage
2	Egypt	3	2	0	1	14	4	+10	6	Knockout stage
3	Mozambique	3	1	0	2	5	9	−4	3	
4	Tanzania	3	0	0	3	0	18	−18	0	

Source: CAF
Rules for classification: Tiebreakers
13 October 2026
17:00

Egypt	8–0	Tanzania
I. El-Sayed 0'30", 24'09"; Talaat 4'50"; Said 5'49", 27'18"; Ali 30'01", 36'57"; Y. El-Sayed 36'13"	Report

Salle Moulay Abdellah, Rabat
Referee: Khalid Hnich (Morocco), Mustapha Rguig (Morocco)
13 October 2026
20:00

Angola	5–1	Mozambique
Santos 10'53", 28'54"; Fortes 14'36"; Santo 15'34"; Cambangula 29'03"	Report	Mário Jr. 19'49"

Salle Moulay Abdellah, Rabat
Referee: Saïd El Haoud (Morocco), Mohammed Al-Sertawi (Libya)

15 October 2026
17:00

Egypt	4–0	Mozambique
Talaat 7'33"; Mário Jr. 8'42" (og); Eissa 30'29"; Yousry 38'52"	Report

Salle Moulay Abdellah, Rabat
Referee: Ali Al-Ayat (Libya), Adel Chenaoua (Algeria)
15 October 2026
20:00

Tanzania	0–6	Angola
	Report	Santo 5'43", 12'43"; Cambangula 17'24", 18'57", 34'46", 36'31"

Salle Moulay Abdellah, Rabat
Referee: Mustapha Rguig (Morocco), Sipho Mahlangu (South Africa)

17 October 2026
20:00

Egypt	2–4	Angola
I. El-Sayed 5'34", 13'25"	Report	Cambangula 15'16", 29'44"; Gomes 24'04"; Fortes 39'54"

Salle Moulay Abdellah, Rabat
Referee: Abdelakram El Hentati (Tunisia), Sipho Mahlangu (South Africa)
17 October 2026
20:00

Mozambique	4–0	Tanzania
Zandamela 5'45", 9'12"; Uetimane 11'04", 33'01"	Report

Salle Ibn Yassine, Rabat
Referee: Elhadji Dieme (Senegal), John Tope Ojeleye (Nigeria)

== Knockout stage ==
In the knockout stage, extra time and penalty shoot-out are used to decide the winner if necessary, except for the third place match where extra time is not played but a direct penalty shoot-out is used, instead.

=== Bracket ===
Semi-finals
Morocco	6
Egypt	0
Angola	3
Algeria	2

Final
Morocco	5
Angola	2
Third place match
Egypt	8
Algeria	1

=== Semi-finals ===
19 October 2026
17:00

Angola	3–2	Algeria
Santos 28'04"; Santo 34'17"; Gabriel 37'19"	Report (CAF)	Hammad 8'31"; Aït Hamadouche 19'06"

Salle Moulay Abdellah, Rabat
Referee: Ali Al-Ayat (Libya), Éric Mindjih (Cameroon)

19 October 2026
20:00

Morocco	6–0	Egypt
Charraoui 8'15", 30'20", 37'07"; Amazal 9'53", 16'12"; Bakkali 21'13"	Report (CAF)

Salle Moulay Abdellah, Rabat
Referee: Nabil Gueddich (Tunisia), Mohammed Al-Sertawi (Libya)

=== Third place match ===
21 October 2026
17:00

Egypt	8–1	Algeria
Ali 13'10", 15'04", 24'29"; I. El-Sayed 13'30"; Ishak 30'41", 33'58"; Salman 32'47"; Yousry 36'47"	Report (CAF)	Aït Hamadouche 39'38"

Salle Moulay Abdellah, Rabat
Referee: Khalid Hnich (Morocco), Saïd El Haoud (Morocco)

=== Final ===
21 October 2026
20:00

Morocco	5–2	Angola
El-Idrissi 16'02"; Jouad 18'09"; Raiss El Fenni 20'38"; Amazal 32'17"; Bakkali 34'35"	Report (CAF)	Cambangula 17'49"; Fortes 37'00"

Salle Moulay Abdellah, Rabat
Referee: Abdelakram El Hentati (Tunisia), Sipho Mahlangu (South Africa)

== Goalscorers ==
There were 97 goals scored in 16 matches, for an average of 6.06 goals per match.

8 goals

- (Angola) João Cambangula "Jó Mahrez"

5 goals

- (Egypt) Ahmed Ali
- (Egypt) Ibrahim El-Sayed "Hema"
- (Morocco) Youssef Jouad
- (Morocco) Idriss Raiss El Fenni

4 goals

- (Angola) Hornes Santo "Ny Sola"
- (Morocco) Soufian Charraoui

3 goals

- (Algeria) Rayane Aït Hamadouche
- (Algeria) Walid Betterki
- (Algeria) Mathieu Hammad
- (Angola) Anderson Fortes
- (Angola) Adérito Santos
- (Morocco) Ismail Amazal
- (Morocco) Bilal Bakkali
- (Morocco) Othmane El-Idrissi
- (Morocco) Soufiane El Mesrar

2 goals

- (Egypt) Mostafa Ishak
- (Egypt) Mohamed Said
- (Egypt) Mohamed Talaat
- (Egypt) Khaled Yousry
- (Mozambique) José Uetimane
- (Mozambique) Délcio Zandamela
- (Zambia) Chota Chileshe
- (Zambia) Musa Chiwaya
- (Zambia) Patrick Mwila

1 goal

- (Algeria) Moussa Haddad
- (Algeria) Skender Si-Chaib
- (Algeria) Samyr Teffaf
- (Angola) Francisco Gabriel "Chico"
- (Angola) Magno Gomes "Mano Sele"
- (Egypt) Alaa Eissa
- (Egypt) Youssef El-Sayed
- (Egypt) Mohamed Salman
- (Libya) Mohammed Abu-Raas
- (Libya) Ibrahim Lemhammel
- (Libya) Abdulhakim Rashid
- (Morocco) Yanis Erraddaf
- (Morocco) Younes M'kasri
- (Mozambique) Mário Júnior
- (Zambia) Royd Chishala

1 own goal

- (Mozambique) Mário Júnior (vs. Egypt)

== Ranking ==
Pos.	Team	G	Pld	W	D	L	Pts	GF	GA	GD
1	Morocco	A	5	5	0	0	15	28	2	+26
2	Angola	B	5	4	0	1	12	20	10	+10
3	Egypt	B	5	3	0	2	9	22	11	+11
4	Algeria	A	5	1	1	3	4	12	21	−9
Eliminated in the group stage
5	Mozambique	B	3	1	0	2	3	5	9	−4
6	Zambia	A	3	1	0	2	3	7	15	−8
7	Libya	A	3	0	1	2	1	3	11	−8
8	Tanzania	B	3	0	0	3	0	0	18	−18
