= Morocco national futsal team =

Morocco
- Nickname(s): Atlas Lions أسود الأطلس ⵉⵣⵎⴰⵡⵏ ⵏ ⵡⴰⵟⵍⴰⵚ
- Association: Royal Moroccan Football Federation
- Confederation: CAF (Africa)
- Head coach: (Morocco) Hicham Dguig
- Captain: Soufiane El Mesrar
- Home stadium: Salle Mohammed V
- FIFA code: MAR
- FIFA ranking: 6 (24 September 2026)
- Highest FIFA ranking: 6 (May 2024; April 2025)
- Lowest FIFA ranking: 7 (October 2024)
Home colours	Away colours

First international
- Belarus 4–1 Morocco (Abu Dhabi, United Arab Emirates; 11 February 1995)

Biggest win
- Morocco 16–0 Somalia (Dammam, Saudi Arabia; 21 June 2022)

Biggest defeat
- Egypt 7–0 Morocco (Cairo, Egypt; 31 July 2004)

FIFA World Cup
- Appearances: 4 (First in 2012)
- Best result: Quarter finals (2021, 2024)

Africa Futsal Cup of Nations
- Appearances: 7 (First in 2000)
- Best result: (gold) Champions (2016, 2020, 2024, 2026)

Arab Futsal Cup
- Appearances: 6 (First in 1998)
- Best result: Champions (2021, 2022, 2023)

The Morocco national futsal team (Arabic: منتخب المغرب لكرة الصالات; Standard Moroccan Tamazight: ⵜⴰⵔⴰⴱⴱⵓⵜ ⵜⴰⵏⴰⵎⵓⵔⵜ ⵜⴰⵎⵖⵔⵉⴱⵉⵜ ⵏ ⵜⵡⵊⵊⴰ ⴳ ⵜⴷⴰⵍⴰ; French: équipe du Maroc de futsal) represents Morocco in international futsal competitions. It is affiliated to the Royal Moroccan Football Federation and is one of the strongest teams in the world.

The team has notably won 4 Africa Futsal Cup of Nations and 3 Arab Futsal Cup titles. They qualified for the World Cup four times, first appearing in 2012. Their best World Cup run was in 2021 and 2024, when they reached the quarter-finals.

== History ==
Morocco were runners-up in both the 1998 Arab Futsal Championship and the 2000 African Futsal Championship and finished in third place in the 2008 African Futsal Championship.

At the 2010 UNAF tournament in Libya, the Moroccan national team recorded comprehensive wins against Algeria 7-2, and Palestine 7-1, and a 4-4 draw against Tunisia. However, they lost against Libya 4-3 in the final and finished as runners-up.

That same year, the Moroccan team also competed in the Mediterranean Futsal Cup which also took place in Libya. After finishing second in their group with 4 points, the Atlas Lions fell to a 1-5 defeat against the eventual champions Croatia. The Moroccans would bounce back in the placement play-offs, where they defeated both Bosnia and Herzegovina 5-3 and Lebanon 6-2 to claim fifth place. Hicham Dguig won the best coach award while the player Yahya Baya featured in the team of the tournament.

On 24 April 2016, Morocco won its first ever African title after defeating Egypt 3-2 in the final. Four years later, they successfully defended their title on home soil with a 5-0 win against the Pharaohs in the final.

On 29 May 2021, They won their first Arab cup title after defeating hosts Egypt 4-0 in the final. In the 2021 FIFA Futsal World Cup, Morocco qualified to the knockout stages for the first time after finishing second in the group stage with 5 points following a 6-0 win against Solomon Islands and two draws against both Thailand and the eventual champions Portugal. They were knocked out in the quarter-finals after narrowly losing 1-0 to Brazil. The following year, they claimed their second Arab cup title after defeating Iraq 3-0. On 5 September 2022, they were ranked 8th in the Futsal world ranking ahead of Italy and behind Kazakhstan.

In September 2022, Morocco took part in the Continental Futsal Championship, a yearly friendly tournament hosted by Thailand. After a 2-2 draw against the hosts and a 4-2 win against fellow African side Mozambique in the first round, Morocco edged past Finland 4-1 in the semi-final. In the final, the Atlas Lions defeated Iran 4-3 to win their first title.

On 16 June 2023, Morocco defeated Kuwait 7-1 in the final, to win its third Arab cup title, becoming the outright most successful team in the competition in the process.

Morocco qualified for the 2024 Futsal Africa Cup of Nations with the country later being awarded the hosting rights of the tournament for the second consecutive time following the withdrawal of Mozambique. After topping their group with ease, with notably a 13-0 thrashing of Zambia in their last group game (their opponent's all-time worst defeat to date). The hosts lifted the trophy for the third time in a row after beating Angola 5-1 in the final, thus tying with Egypt as the most successful teams in the competition.

On 21 October 2026, Morocco claimed their fourth African title after defeating Angola 5-2 in the final.

== Competitive record ==
=== FIFA Futsal World Cup ===
FIFA Futsal World Cup record
Year	Round	Pld	W	D	L	GS	GA	GD
(Netherlands) 1989	Did not enter							
(British Hong Kong) 1992	Did not enter							
(Spain) 1996	Did not enter							
(Guatemala) 2000	Did not qualify							
(Chinese Taipei) 2004	Did not qualify							
(Brazil) 2008	Did not qualify							
2012	Group stage	3	0	0	3	5	15	−10
(Colombia) 2016	Group stage	3	0	0	3	6	14	−8
(Lithuania) 2021	Quarter-finals	5	2	2	1	13	7	+6
(Uzbekistan) 2024	Quarter-finals	5	3	0	2	16	15	+1
Total	4/10	16	5	2	9	40	51	−11

==== Futsal Confederations Cup ====
Futsal Confederations Cup record
Year	Round	Pld	W	D	L	GF	GA	GD
(Libya) 2009	Did not enter							
(Brazil) 2013	Did not enter							
(Kuwait) 2014	Did not enter							
Total	0/3	-	-	-	-	-	-	-

=== Africa Futsal Cup of Nations ===
Africa Futsal Cup of Nations record
Year	Round	Pld	W	D	L	GF	GA	GD
(Egypt) 1996	Did not enter							
(Egypt) 2000	Runners-up	3	1	1	1	24	12	+12
2004	Semi-Finals	2	0	0	2	3	11	−8
(Libya) 2008	Third place	6	4	0	2	20	11	+9
(Burkina Faso) 2011	Cancelled							
(South Africa) 2016	Champions	5	4	0	1	17	10	+7
(Morocco) 2020	Champions	5	5	0	0	23	1	+22
(Morocco) 2024	Champions	5	5	0	0	37	6	+31
(Morocco) 2026	Champions	5	5	0	0	28	2	+26
Total	7/8	31	24	1	5	152	53	+99

==== Arab Futsal Cup ====
Arab Futsal Cup record
Year	Round	Pld	W	D	L	GF	GA	GD
(Egypt) 1998	Runners-up	5	4	0	1	30	19	+11
(Egypt) 2005	Runners-up	5	4	0	1	30	15	+15
(Libya) 2007	Fourth Place	5	2	0	3	12	18	−6
(Egypt) 2008	Did not participate							
(Egypt) 2021	Champions	5	5	0	0	26	2	+24
(Saudi Arabia) 2022	Champions	6	6	0	0	46	6	+40
(Saudi Arabia) 2023	Champions	6	6	0	0	32	6	+26
Total	6/7	38	27	0	5	176	66	+110

=== North African Futsal Tournament ===
North African Futsal Tournament record
Year	Round	Pld	W	D	L	GF	GA	GD
(Libya) 2005	Runners-up	4	2	0	2	23	8	+15
(Tunisia) 2009	Did not participate							
(Libya) 2010	Runners-up	4	3	0	1	21	5	+16
Total	2/3	8	5	0	3	44	13	+31

== Head-to-head record ==
The following table shows Morocco's head-to-head record in the FIFA Futsal World Cup.

Opponent	Pld	W	D	L	GF	GA	GD	Win %
Azerbaijan	1	0	0	1	0	5	−5	0.00
Brazil	2	0	0	2	1	4	−3	0.00
Iran	3	1	0	2	8	10	−2	33.33
Panama	2	1	0	1	9	11	−2	50.00
Portugal	2	0	1	1	4	7	−3	0.00
Solomon Islands	1	1	0	0	6	0	+6	100.00
Spain	2	0	0	2	4	9	−5	0.00
Tajikistan	1	1	0	0	4	2	+2	100.00
Thailand	1	0	1	0	1	1	+0	0.00
Venezuela	1	1	0	0	3	2	+1	100.00
Total	16	5	2	9	40	51	−11	31.25

== World ranking ==
FIFA published the Futsal World Ranking for the first time in May 2024.

Africa	World	Country	Points
1	6	Morocco	1430.55
2	37	Egypt	1098.56
3	47	Angola	1054.42
4	50	Libya	1046.24
5	51	South Africa	1041.84
6	62	Equatorial Guinea	999.11
7	76	Ivory Coast	974.01
8	90	Zambia	954.34

As of September 2024

== Players ==
=== Current squad ===
The following players were called up to the squad for the 2023 Arab Futsal Cup.

No.	Pos.	Player	Date of birth (age)	Caps	Club
1	GK	Abdelkrim Anbia	8 April 1989 (age 37)		(Morocco) ASF Agadir
12	GK	Reda Khiyari	21 June 1990 (age 36)		(Morocco) CL Ksar El-Kebir
4	DF	Youssef Jouad	30 December 1999 (age 26)		(Morocco) SCC Mohammédia
5	DF	Anas Taybi	25 March 1996 (age 30)		(Morocco) CL Ksar El-Kebir
6	DF	Soufiane Borite	11 December 1992 (age 33)		(Finland) FC Kemi
17	DF	Othmane El-Idrissi	7 August 1999 (age 27)		(Morocco) CL Ksar El-Kebir
3	FW	Anás El-Ayyane	30 October 1992 (age 34)		(Spain) Ribera Navarra FS
7	FW	Ismail Amazal	10 October 1996 (age 30)		(Morocco) ASF Agadir
8	FW	Saad Knia (captain)	6 September 1987 (age 39)		(Morocco) SCC Mohammédia
9	FW	Otmane Boumezou	8 July 1992 (age 34)		(Morocco) SCC Mohammédia
10	FW	Soufian Charraoui	15 November 1996 (age 30)		(France) Mouvaux Lille MF
11	FW	Mohamed Kamal	20 July 2001 (age 25)		(Morocco) Club Feth Settat
13	FW	Hamza Maimón	11 July 1991 (age 35)		(Spain) Levante UD
14	FW	Idriss Raiss El-Fenni	9 May 1996 (age 30)		(Morocco) SCC Mohammédia
15	FW	Khalid Bouzid	20 April 1998 (age 28)		(Spain) Industrias Santa Coloma
16	FW	Anas Dahani	14 December 1999 (age 26)		(Morocco) SCC Mohammédia

=== Recent call-ups ===
The following players have also been called up to the squad within the last 12 months.

Pos.	Player	Date of birth (age)	Caps	Goals	Club	Latest call-up
^{COV} Player withdrew from the squad due to contracting COVID-19.^{INJ} Player withdrew from the squad due to an injury.^{PRE} Preliminary squad.^{RET} Retired from international futsal.

=== Previous squads ===
FIFA Futsal World Cup squads

- 2012 FIFA Futsal World Cup squad
- 2016 FIFA Futsal World Cup squad
- 2021 FIFA Futsal World Cup squad

Africa Futsal Cup of Nations

- 2020 Futsal Africa Cup of Nations squad
- 2024 Futsal Africa Cup of Nations squad

== Honours ==
=== Official competitions ===
Africa Futsal Cup of Nations

- Champions: 2016, 2020, 2024, 2026 (Record)
- Runner-up: 2000
- Third-place: 2008, 2004

Arab Futsal Cup

- (gold) Champions: 2021, 2022, 2023 (Record)
- (silver) Runners-up: 1998, 2005

UEFS Futsal Men's Championship

- (silver) Runners-up: 1995

Islamic Solidarity Games

- (silver) Runners-up: 2025

=== Friendly Tournaments ===
CFA International Futsal Tournament

- (gold) Champions: 2019

Continental Futsal Championship

- (gold) Champions: 2022

Rabat International Futsal Tournament

- (gold) Champions: 2023, 2025

Croatia International Futsal Tournament

- (gold) Champions: 2020, 2023, 2025, 2026

Vietnam International Futsal Tournament (Ho Chi Minh City)

- (gold) Champions: 2024

Berkane International Futsal Tournament

- (gold) Champions: 2026

== See also ==
- Sport in Morocco
- Morocco national football team
