= Zambia national futsal team =

- Nickname(s): Chipolopolo (The Bullets)
- Association: Football Association of Zambia
- Confederation: CAF (Africa)
- FIFA code: ZAM
- FIFA ranking: 87 ▲3 (4 April 2025)
| Home colours | Away colours |

First international
- Egypt 9–0 Zambia (Tripoli, Libya; 21 March 2008)

Biggest win
- Zambia 8–4 Angola (Tripoli, Libya; 24 March 2008); Costa Rica 3–7 Zambia (Manaus, Brazil; 21 October 2011)

Biggest defeat
- Morocco 13-0 Zambia (Rabat, Morocco; 15 April 2024)

FIFA World Cup
- Appearances: None

Africa Futsal Cup of Nations
- Appearances: 3 (First in 2008)
- Best result: 4th place (2016)

Grand Prix de Futsal
- Appearances: 3 (First in 2010)
- Best result: 8th place (2015)

The Zambia national futsal team is controlled by the Football Association of Zambia, the governing body for futsal in Zambia and represents the country in international futsal competitions.

== Tournaments ==
=== FIFA Futsal World Cup ===
- 1989 – Did not enter
- 1992 – Did not enter
- 1996 – Did not enter
- 2000 – Did not enter
- 2004 – Did not enter
- 2008 – Did not qualify
- 2012 – Did not qualify
- 2016 – Did not qualify
- 2021 – Did not qualify
- 2024 – Did not qualify

=== Africa Futsal Cup of Nations ===
- 1996 – Did not enter
- 2000 – Did not enter
- 2004 – Did not enter
- 2008 – Round 1
- 2011 – Cancelled
- 2016 – 4th place
- 2020 - Did not qualify
- 2024 - Group Stage

=== Grand Prix de Futsal ===
- 2005 – Did not enter
- 2006 – Did not enter
- 2007 – Did not enter
- 2008 – Did not enter
- 2009 – Did not enter
- 2010 – 15th place
- 2011 – 14th place
- 2013 – Did not enter
- 2014 – Did not enter
- 2015 – 8th place
- 2016 – TBD
