= 2020 Futsal Africa Cup of Nations squads =

The following is a list of squads for each national team which competed at the 2020 Futsal Africa Cup of Nations. The tournament took place in Morocco, between 28 January–7 February 2020. It was the sixth competition organised by the Confederation of African Football.

The eight national teams involved in the tournament were required to register a squad of maximum 14 players, minimum two of whom must be goalkeepers. Only players in these squads were eligible to take part in the tournament. CAF published the final lists with squad numbers on their website on 25 January 2020.

The full squad listings are below. The age listed for each player is on 28 January 2020, the first day of the tournament. The nationality for each club reflects the national association (not the league) to which the club is affiliated. A flag is included for coaches who are of a different nationality than their own national team.

== Group A ==
=== Morocco ===
Coach: Hicham Dguig

The final squad was announced on 18 January 2020.

No.	Pos.	Player	Date of birth (age)	Club
1	GK	Abdelkrim Nbia	8 April 1989 (aged 30)	(Royal Moroccan Football Federation) Ajax Tetouan
2	DF	Achraf Saoud	21 June 1990 (aged 29)	(Royal Moroccan Football Federation) Sakr Agadir
3	FW	Anás El-Ayyane	30 October 1992 (aged 27)	(Italian Football Federation) Lynx Latina
4	DF	Mohamed Jouad	4 March 1993 (aged 26)	(French Football Federation) Toulon Élite
5	MF	Youssef El Mazray	1 July 1987 (aged 32)	(Royal Moroccan Football Federation) Fath Settat
6	DF	Soufiane Borite	11 December 1992 (aged 27)	(Royal Moroccan Football Federation) Ville Haute Kénitra
7	MF	Zakaria Kauiri	17 August 1987 (aged 32)	(Royal Moroccan Football Federation) Loukous Ksar Elkbir
8	MF	Saad Knia	6 September 1987 (aged 32)	(Royal Moroccan Football Federation) Fath Settat
9	FW	Abdelatif Fati	25 December 1990 (aged 29)	(Royal Moroccan Football Federation) Fath Settat
10	FW	Soufiane El Mesrar	5 June 1990 (aged 29)	(French Football Federation) ACCES
11	MF	Bilal Bakkali	24 February 1993 (aged 26)	(French Football Federation) ACCES
12	GK	Reda Khiyari	21 May 1991 (aged 28)	(Royal Moroccan Football Federation) Ville Haute Kénitra
13	MF	Hamza Maimón	11 July 1991 (aged 28)	(Royal Spanish Football Federation) Palma
14	MF	Idriss El-Fenni	9 May 1996 (aged 23)	(Royal Moroccan Football Federation) Ajax Tanger

=== Libya ===
Coach: (Spain) Julio Fernández

The preliminary squad was announced on 11 December 2019.

No.	Pos.	Player	Date of birth (age)	Club
1	GK	Fatih Ali	24 September 1989 (aged 30)	(Libyan Football Federation) Al-Ittihad
2	DF	Mohamed Zreeg	28 April 1991 (aged 28)	(Libyan Football Federation) Asarya
3	GK	Abouaahman Al-Dabaiba	14 October 1981 (aged 38)	(Libyan Football Federation) Asswehly
4	DF	Mohamed Aboras	27 May 1992 (aged 27)	(Libyan Football Federation) Al-Tarsana
5	DF	Abdulhalim Al-Serksia	30 May 1988 (aged 31)	(Libyan Football Federation) Asswehly
6	MF	Husam Al-Warffali	3 December 1993 (aged 26)	(Libyan Football Federation) Al-Ittihad
7	FW	Hamdi Al-Shawain	17 January 1985 (aged 35)	(Libyan Football Federation) Asswehly
8	MF	Fadel Sleik	3 April 1998 (aged 21)	(Libyan Football Federation) Al-Ittihad
9	FW	Ali Ibrahim	17 September 1992 (aged 27)	(Libyan Football Federation) Abu Salem
10	FW	Mohamed Rahoma	5 May 1984 (aged 35)	(Libyan Football Federation) Al-Ittihad
11	FW	Adham Al-Toumi	6 December 1989 (aged 30)	(Libyan Football Federation) Aschat
12	GK	Ramzi Al-Sharif	28 November 1988 (aged 31)	(Libyan Football Federation) Al-Nasr
13	FW	Ibrahim Lamhammel	2 August 1999 (aged 20)	(Libyan Football Federation) Asswehly
14	DF	Mohamed Suleiman	27 September 1988 (aged 31)	(Libyan Football Federation) Asswehly

=== Equatorial Guinea ===
Coach: (Spain) Ricardo Íñiguez

No.	Pos.	Player	Date of birth (age)	Club
1	GK	Abubakar Alima	15 March 1999 (aged 20)	(Equatoguinean Football Federation) Leones Vegetarianos
2	MF	Donald Lopeo	13 July 1996 (aged 23)	(Equatoguinean Football Federation) Leones Vegetarianos
3	MF	Domingo Manami	22 May 1995 (aged 24)	(Equatoguinean Football Federation) Leones Vegetarianos
4	DF	Roberto Tobe	14 July 1984 (aged 35)	(Italian Football Federation) Signor Prestito
5	DF	Carlos Ndong	18 June 1996 (aged 23)	(Equatoguinean Football Federation) Leones Vegetarianos
6	MF	Keny	3 August 1981 (aged 38)	(Royal Spanish Football Federation) Manzanares
7	DF	Junior Wheeler	15 August 1991 (aged 28)	(Equatoguinean Football Federation) Asofnil
8	MF	Jesús Mba	5 May 2000 (aged 19)	(Equatoguinean Football Federation) Asofnil
9	FW	Claudio Bacale	27 May 1996 (aged 23)	(Equatoguinean Football Federation) Atlético Los Ángeles
10	MF	Muller	19 November 1998 (aged 21)	(Equatoguinean Football Federation) Leones Vegetarianos
11	MF	Vicente Owono	3 April 1999 (aged 20)	(Equatoguinean Football Federation) Leones Vegetarianos
12	FW	Paulino Chochi	25 January 1994 (aged 26)	(Equatoguinean Football Federation) Atlético Los Ángeles
13	GK	Juan Hipólito Mbaga	30 August 2003 (aged 16)	(Royal Spanish Football Federation) Inter Movistar
14	MF	David Ntutumu	12 August 2002 (aged 17)	(Equatoguinean Football Federation) Asofnil

=== Mauritius ===
Coach: (France) Théo Timboussaint

The final squad was announced on 22 January 2020.

No.	Pos.	Player	Date of birth (age)	Club
1	GK	Shane Arékion	23 December 1996 (aged 23)	(Mauritius Football Association) Cercle de Joachim
2	GK	Waiche Jamalkhan	17 May 1991 (aged 28)	(Mauritius Football Association) Red Warriors
3	DF	Suhayl Hurdoyal	1 September 2000 (aged 19)	(Mauritius Football Association) Cercle de Joachim
4	DF	Muhammad Nuckcheddy	30 April 1988 (aged 31)	(Mauritius Football Association) Castel Celtic
5	DF	Samuel Rebet	7 March 1987 (aged 32)	(Mauritius Football Association) Grande Rivière Noire
6	MF	Frédéric Sarah	26 February 1998 (aged 21)	(Mauritius Football Association) Cercle de Joachim
7	MF	Fabrice Agathe	18 April 1985 (aged 34)	(Mauritius Football Association) Rivière du Rempart
8	MF	Mercyn Jocelyn	21 August 1991 (aged 28)	(Mauritius Football Association) Pamplemousses
9	FW	Jordan Moutoula	18 April 2000 (aged 19)	(Mauritius Football Association) GRSE Wanderers
10	MF	Jean-Yves Rosario	3 July 1990 (aged 29)	(Mauritius Football Association) Entente Boulet Rouge
11	MF	Fabrice Pithia	7 May 1987 (aged 32)	(Mauritius Football Association) Savanne
12	DF	Robin Nurjandoa	31 May 1980 (aged 39)	(Mauritius Football Association) Red Warriors
13	DF	Pierre Rose	18 February 1998 (aged 21)	(Mauritius Football Association) Red Warriors
14	DF	Gérald René	20 June 1986 (aged 33)	(Mauritius Football Association) Red Warriors

== Group B ==
=== Egypt ===
Coach: Hesham Saleh

The final squad was announced on 23 January 2020.

No.	Pos.	Player	Date of birth (age)	Club
1	GK	Gamal Abdel Nasser	20 January 1993 (aged 27)	(Egyptian Football Association) National Bank of Egypt
2	GK	Mahmoud Shobier	26 March 1994 (aged 25)	(Egyptian Football Association) Media
3	FW	Abdel Rahman El Ashwal	25 December 1993 (aged 26)	(Egyptian Football Association) Misr Lel Makkasa
4	DF	Moamen Hamda		(Egyptian Football Association)
5	DF	Ibrahim Bogy	18 March 1987 (aged 32)	(Egyptian Football Association) Misr Lel Makkasa
6	GK	Emad Ahmed	1 January 1986 (aged 34)	(Egyptian Football Association) Media
7	FW	Ibrahim Eika	17 October 1987 (aged 32)	(Egyptian Football Association) Misr Lel Makkasa
8	FW	Mizo	15 October 1985 (aged 34)	(Egyptian Football Association) Keksada
9	FW	Tarek Shoola	12 June 1996 (aged 23)	(Egyptian Football Association) Ittihad El Shorta
10	DF	Ahmed Moza	18 October 1988 (aged 31)	(Egyptian Football Association) Misr Lel Makkasa
11	MF	Mohamed Said	30 September 1995 (aged 24)	(Egyptian Football Association) National Bank of Egypt
12	DF	Mostafa Eid	17 August 1992 (aged 27)	(Egyptian Football Association) Misr Lel Makkasa
13	DF	Koki	25 November 1994 (aged 25)	(Egyptian Football Association) Misr Lel Makkasa
14	MF	Khaled Maradona	12 April 1994 (aged 25)	(Saudi Arabian Football Federation) Al Nahda

=== Guinea ===
Coach: Mohamed Camara

No.	Pos.	Player	Date of birth (age)	Club
1	GK	Mohamed Laminy Diaby	2 December 1999 (aged 20)	(French Football Federation) C'West Nantes
2	DF	Moktar Keita	10 August 1992 (aged 27)	(French Football Federation) C'West Nantes
3	FW	Daouda Camara	1 January 2003 (aged 17)	(Guinean Football Federation) Académie Saboui
4	DF	Fansoumane Cissé	27 March 1995 (aged 24)	(French Football Federation) FC Robretieres
5	DF	Issiaga Sylla	5 December 2003 (aged 16)	(Guinean Football Federation) Espérance Kaloum
6	MF	Sidina Dramé	30 June 1994 (aged 25)	(French Football Federation) TA Rennes
7	FW	Batoura Keita	14 September 1994 (aged 25)	(French Football Federation) Plaisance All Stars
8	FW	Mohamadou Tamanaté	9 May 1992 (aged 27)	(French Football Federation) Bagneux
9	MF	Salim Keita	22 June 1996 (aged 23)	(French Football Federation) C'West Nantes
10	MF	Yamoussa Soumah	5 January 1998 (aged 22)	(Guinean Football Federation) Real Bonfi
11	FW	Hervé Camara	20 November 2002 (aged 17)	(Guinean Football Federation) Académie Lambanyi
12	GK	Mamadou Yéro Diallo	3 July 2003 (aged 16)	(Guinean Football Federation) Académie Sonny Sport
13	MF	Mbemba Fofana	19 August 1992 (aged 27)	(French Football Federation) C'West Nantes
14	MF	Jean Baruxakis	14 June 1995 (aged 24)	(French Football Federation) FC Essarts

=== Angola ===
Coach: Benvindo Inácio

The preliminary squad was announced on 22 January 2020.

No.	Pos.	Player	Date of birth (age)	Club
1	GK	Neblú	13 May 1994 (aged 25)	(Angolan Football Federation) Coprat FC
2	FW	Dabino	1 July 1992 (aged 27)	(Angolan Football Federation) Coprat FC
3	DF	Man-Tó	23 October 1994 (aged 25)	(Angolan Football Federation) RNT
4	DF	Leu	16 May 2000 (aged 19)	(Angolan Football Federation) Coprat FC
5	MF	Nonó	2 November 1991 (aged 28)	(Angolan Football Federation) Coprat FC
6	MF	António Dias	9 March 1995 (aged 24)	(Angolan Football Federation) RNT
7	FW	Prado	15 January 1991 (aged 29)	(Angolan Football Federation) Coprat FC
8	MF	Nuno dos Santos	27 April 1995 (aged 24)	(Angolan Football Federation) Coprat FC
9	MF	Caluanda	8 March 1995 (aged 24)	(Angolan Football Federation) Coprat FC
10	MF	Manocele	14 June 1997 (aged 22)	(Angolan Football Federation) RNT
11	MF	Jó	15 April 1998 (aged 21)	(Angolan Football Federation) Coprat FC
12	GK	Chico	27 September 1991 (aged 28)	(Angolan Football Federation) RNT
13	MF	Bebucho	15 February 1991 (aged 28)	(Angolan Football Federation) Académicos do Namibe
14	DF	Osnã	3 February 1994 (aged 25)	(Angolan Football Federation) Coprat FC

=== Mozambique ===
Coach: Naymo Abdul

The final squad was announced on 12 January 2020.

No.	Pos.	Player	Date of birth (age)	Club
1	GK	Nelson Luvala	14 April 1985 (aged 34)	(Mozambican Football Federation) Galácticos
2	FW	Idelson Benesse	9 February 1996 (aged 23)	(Mozambican Football Federation) GDI
3	MF	Ziraldo Daniel	9 August 1993 (aged 26)	(Mozambican Football Federation) GDI
4	FW	Abilio Levessene	22 February 1998 (aged 21)	(Mozambican Football Federation) Galácticos
5	MF	Dino Fernando	21 September 1996 (aged 23)	(Mozambican Football Federation) Liga Desportiva de Chimoio
6	DF	Flávio Chauque	14 January 1987 (aged 33)	(Mozambican Football Federation) GDI
7	DF	Mauro Cossa	26 March 1997 (aged 22)	(Mozambican Football Federation) Petromoc
8	MF	Oséias dos Santos	5 June 1993 (aged 26)	(Mozambican Football Federation) GDI
9	FW	Magu	25 April 1995 (aged 24)	(Mozambican Football Federation) GDI
10	DF	Edson Lamarques	4 July 1990 (aged 29)	(Mozambican Football Federation) Liga Muçulmana
11	MF	Mito	28 September 1991 (aged 28)	(Mozambican Football Federation) Petromoc
12	FW	Mário Júnior	25 February 1994 (aged 25)	(Mozambican Football Federation) GDI
13	DF	Vasquinho	30 May 1997 (aged 22)	(Mozambican Football Federation) Petromoc
14	GK	Custódio Rendição	4 April 1983 (aged 36)	(Mozambican Football Federation) Petromoc
