= Futsal Africa Cup of Nations =

African association football tournament for men's national futsal teams

- Organiser(s): CAF
- Founded: 1996
- Region: Africa
- Teams: 8
- Current champions: Morocco (4th title)
- Most championships: Morocco (4 titles)
- 2026 Futsal Africa Cup of Nations

The Futsal Africa Cup of Nations (previously known as the African Futsal Championship) is the main national futsal competition of the Confederation of African Football nations. It was first held in 1996 and was originally played every four years until it was announced that the tournament would take place every two years starting from 2026. It also serves as qualification to FIFA Futsal World Cup in years the World Cup takes place.

In 2015, the CAF Executive Committee changed the name of the tournament from the African Futsal Championship to the Futsal Africa Cup of Nations, similar to the football's version, Africa Cup of Nations.

Only three teams have won the cup since its foundation. Morocco is the most successful team with four titles, followed by Egypt with 3 titles. Libya has won it once. Currently, Morocco holds the title of African champion after defeating Angola 5–2 in the 2026 final held in the Moroccan capital.

== History ==
The first edition took place in 1996, which witnessed Egypt claiming the first continental title. Egypt went on to dominate winning three consecutive title before losing the 2008 final to Libya.

2011 African Futsal Championship has been cancelled as Burkina Faso withdrew from hosting the event which was meant to start at the beginning of April and a replacement could not be found.

In the 6th edition, Morocco won the title for the first time after defeating Egypt 3–2 in the final. In the following edition, Morocco defeated Egypt 5–0 in the 2020 final, becoming the second nation after Egypt to win back-to-back titles.

The 2024 Futsal Africa Cup of Nations was scheduled to be held in Mozambique, but Mozambique declined to host the competition, and Morocco was selected to host the 2024 edition. For this edition, Morocco defeated Angola 5–1 in the final, thus joining Egypt as the two teams to have won the continental championship on three occasions.

== Editions ==
| # | Year | Host | Final | | | Third Place Match | | | Teams |
| # | Year | Host | Winner | Score | Runner-up | Third Place | Score | Fourth Place | Teams |
| 1 | 1996; Details | Egypt | Egypt | ^{n/a} | Ghana | Zimbabwe | ^{n/a} | Somalia | 5 |
| 2 | 2000; Details | Egypt | Egypt | ^{n/a} | Morocco | Libya | ^{n/a} | South Africa | 4 |
| 3 | 2004; Details | Home & away | Egypt | 10 – 2; 3 – 5 | Mozambique | Morocco | ^{n/a} WO | Guinea-Bissau | 8 |
| 4 | 2008; Details | Libya | Libya | 4 – 3 a.e.t. | Egypt | Morocco | 3 – 1 a.e.t. | Mozambique | 10 |
| - | 2011; Details | Burkina Faso | ^{Cancelled} | | | ^{Cancelled} | | | - |
| 5 | 2016; Details | South Africa | Morocco | 3 – 2 | Egypt | Mozambique | 5 – 5 a.e.t. (2 – 1) pen | Zambia | 8 (14) |
| 6 | 2020; Details | Morocco | Morocco | 5 – 0 | Egypt | Angola | 2 – 0 | Libya | 8 (13) |
| 7 | 2024; Details | Morocco | Morocco | 5 – 1 | Angola | Libya | 2 – 2 (3 – 1) pen | Egypt | 8 (13) |
| 8 | 2026; Details | Morocco | Morocco | 5 – 2 | Angola | Egypt | 8 – 1 | Algeria | 8(19) |

^n/a A round-robin tournament determined the final standings.
^Cancelled The 2011 tournament was cancelled. To determine the three African qualifiers to the 2012 FIFA Futsal World Cup, a separate qualification tournament was held, with Egypt, Libya and Morocco qualifying.

== Performance by nations ==
| Team | Titles | Runners-up | Third place | Fourth place |
|---|---|---|---|---|
| Morocco | 4 (2016, 2020*, 2024*, 2026*) | 1 (2000) | 2 (2004, 2008) | |
| Egypt | 3 (1996*, 2000*, 2004) | 3 (2008, 2016, 2020) | 1 (2026) | 1 (2024) |
| Libya | 1 (2008*) | | 2 (2000, 2024) | 1 (2020) |
| Angola | | 2 (2024, 2026) | 1 (2020) | |
| Mozambique | | 1 (2004) | 1 (2016) | 1 (2008) |
| Ghana | | 1 (1996) | | |
| Zimbabwe | | | 1 (1996) | |
| Somalia | | | | 1 (1996) |
| South Africa | | | | 1 (2000) |
| Guinea-Bissau | | | | 1 (2004) |
| Zambia | | | | 1 (2016) |
| Algeria | | | | 1 (2026) |

* = hosts

== Medals ==
| Rank | Nation | Gold | Silver | Bronze | Total |
|---|---|---|---|---|---|
| 1 | Morocco | 4 | 1 | 2 | 7 |
| 2 | Egypt | 3 | 3 | 1 | 7 |
| 3 | Libya | 1 | 0 | 2 | 3 |
| 4 | Angola | 0 | 2 | 1 | 3 |
| 5 | Mozambique | 0 | 1 | 1 | 2 |
| 6 | Ghana | 0 | 1 | 0 | 1 |
| 7 | Zimbabwe | 0 | 0 | 1 | 1 |
| Totals (7 entries) | | 8 | 8 | 8 | 24 |

== Awards ==
| Year | Top goalscorer(s) | Gls | Best player | Best goalkeeper | Ref. |
|---|---|---|---|---|---|
| (Morocco) 2020 | (Mozambique) Jose da Silva Magu | 6 | - | (Morocco) Rheda Khiyari | |
| (Morocco) 2024 | (Morocco) Soufian Charraoui | 7 | (Morocco) Bilal Bakkali | (Morocco) Abdelkrim Anbia | |
| (Morocco) 2026 | (Angola) Joao Cambangula | 8 | (Morocco) Youssef Jouad | (Morocco) Youssef Bensellam | |

== Participating nations ==
| Team | (Egypt) 1996 | (Egypt) 2000 | h/a 2004 | (Libya) 2008 | (South Africa) 2016 | (Morocco) 2020 | (Morocco) 2024 | (Morocco) 2026 | Years |
|---|---|---|---|---|---|---|---|---|---|
| Algeria | × | × | × | × | × | • | • | 4th | 1 |
| Angola | × | × | × | R1 | R1 | 3rd | 2nd | 2nd | 4 |
| Cameroon | × | × | × | R1 | • | × | × | • | 1 |
| DR Congo | 5th | × | × | × | × | × | × | × | 1 |
| Egypt | 1st | 1st | 1st | 2nd | 2nd | 2nd | 4th | 3rd | 8 |
| Equatorial Guinea | × | × | × | × | × | R1 | × | × | 1 |
| Ghana | 2nd | × | × | × | × | × | R1 | • | 2 |
| Guinea | × | × | × | × | × | R1 | × | • | 1 |
| Guinea-Bissau | × | × | 4th | × | × | × | × | × | 1 |
| Libya | × | 3rd | × | 1st | R1 | 4th | 3rd | R1 | 6 |
| Mauritania | × | × | × | × | × | × | R1 | • | 1 |
| Mauritius | × | × | × | × | × | § | × | × | 1 |
| Morocco | × | 2nd | 3rd | 3rd | 1st | 1st | 1st | 1st | 7 |
| Mozambique | × | × | 2nd | 4th | 3rd | R1 | • | R1 | 5 |
| Namibia | × | × | × | × | × | × | R1 | • | 1 |
| Nigeria | × | × | × | R1 | × | × | × | × | 1 |
| Somalia | 4th | × | × | × | × | × | × | × | 1 |
| South Africa | × | 4th | R1 | R1 | R1 | •• | × | × | 4 |
| Tanzania | × | × | × | × | × | × | • | R1 | 1 |
| Tunisia | × | × | × | R1 | R1 | × | × | × | 2 |
| Zambia | × | × | × | R1 | 4th | • | R1 | R1 | 4 |
| Zimbabwe | 3rd | × | × | × | × | × | × | × | 1 |
| Total | 5 | 4 | 5 | 10 | 8 | 8 | 8 | 8 | |

Legend

- 1st – Champions
- 2nd – Runners-up
- 3rd – Third place
- 4th – Fourth place
- SF – Semifinals
- 5th – 5th place
- R1 – Round 1
- Q – Qualified for upcoming tournament
- × – Did not enter
- • – Did not qualify
- × – Withdrew / Banned / Entry not accepted by FIFA
- •• – Qualified but withdrew before the tournament
- § – Withdrew during the tournament (after one or more match(es))
- – To be determined
- – Hosts

== Summary (1996-2026) ==
As of 2026 Futsal Africa Cup of Nations

| Rank | Team | Part | M | W | D | L | GF | GA | GD | Points |
|---|---|---|---|---|---|---|---|---|---|---|
| 1 | Egypt | 8 | 36 | 24 | 5 | 7 | 213 | 95 | +118 | 77 |
| 2 | Morocco | 7 | 31 | 24 | 1 | 5 | 152 | 53 | +99 | 73 |
| 3 | Libya | 6 | 25 | 12 | 4 | 9 | 76 | 75 | +1 | 40 |
| 4 | Angola | 5 | 22 | 12 | 1 | 9 | 89 | 75 | +14 | 37 |
| 5 | Mozambique | 7 | 23 | 10 | 3 | 10 | 84 | 77 | +7 | 33 |
| 6 | Zambia | 4 | 14 | 4 | 2 | 8 | 49 | 85 | -36 | 14 |
| 7 | Ghana | 2 | 7 | 3 | 0 | 4 | 50 | 33 | +17 | 9 |
| 8 | Zimbabwe | 1 | 4 | 2 | 1 | 1 | 21 | 16 | +5 | 7 |
| 9 | Tunisia | 2 | 7 | 2 | 0 | 5 | 19 | 24 | -5 | 6 |
| 10 | South Africa | 4 | 12 | 2 | 0 | 10 | 33 | 102 | -69 | 6 |
| 11 | Algeria | 1 | 5 | 1 | 1 | 3 | 12 | 21 | -9 | 4 |
| 12 | Nigeria | 1 | 4 | 1 | 1 | 2 | 9 | 12 | -3 | 4 |
| 13 | Mauritania | 1 | 3 | 1 | 0 | 2 | 15 | 16 | -1 | 3 |
| 14 | Equatorial Guinea | 1 | 3 | 1 | 0 | 2 | 6 | 12 | -6 | 3 |
| 15 | Guinea | 1 | 3 | 1 | 0 | 2 | 8 | 17 | -9 | 3 |
| 16 | Cameroon | 1 | 4 | 0 | 1 | 3 | 6 | 22 | -16 | 1 |
| 17 | Somalia | 1 | 4 | 0 | 1 | 3 | 5 | 31 | -26 | 1 |
| 18 | DR Congo | 1 | 4 | 0 | 1 | 3 | 14 | 45 | -31 | 1 |
| 19 | Tanzania | 1 | 3 | 0 | 0 | 3 | 0 | 18 | -18 | 0 |
| 20 | Guinea-Bissau | 1 | 0 | 0 | 0 | 0 | 0 | 0 | 0 | 0 |
| 21 | Mauritius | 1 | 3 | 0 | 0 | 3 | 2 | 10 | -8 | 0 |
| 22 | Namibia | 1 | 3 | 0 | 0 | 3 | 12 | 26 | -14 | 0 |

– Record

== Qualification ==
| # | Year | Games | Teams | Qualified Teams |
|---|---|---|---|---|
| 1 | 1996 African Futsal Championship | No Qualification | | 5 |
| 2 | 2000 African Futsal Championship | No Qualification | | 4 |
| 3 | 2004 African Futsal Championship | No Qualification | | 8 |
| 4 | 2008 African Futsal Championship | No Qualification | | 10 |
| 5 | 2016 Futsal Africa Cup of Nations | 2016 Qualification | 12 | 6 + 2 |
| 6 | 2020 Futsal Africa Cup of Nations | 2020 Qualification | 10 | 5 + 3 |
| 7 | 2024 Africa Futsal Cup of Nations | 2024 Qualification | 10 | 5 + 3 |
| 8 | 2026 Futsal Africa Cup of Nations | 2026 Qualification | 19 | 7 + 1 |
| Total | 8 | 4 | Max:19 | Max:8 |

== Results at the FIFA Futsal World Cup ==
Legend

- 1st – Champions
- 2nd – Runners-up
- 3rd – Third place
- 4th – Fourth place
- QF – Quarterfinals
- R2 – Round 2 (1989–2008, second group stage, top 8; 2012–present: knockout round of 16)
- R1 – Round 1
- – Hosts
- – Not a CAF member
- Q – Qualified for upcoming tournament

| Team | (Netherlands) 1989 | (Hong Kong) 1992 | (Spain) 1996 | (Guatemala) 2000 | (Chinese Taipei) 2004 | (Brazil) 2008 | (Thailand) 2012 | (Colombia) 2016 | (Lithuania) 2021 | (Uzbekistan) 2024 | 2028 | Total |
|---|---|---|---|---|---|---|---|---|---|---|---|---|
| Algeria | R1 | | | | | | | | | | | 1 |
| Angola | | | | | | | | | R1 | R1 | | 2 |
| Egypt | | | R1 | R2 | R1 | R1 | R2 | QF | R1 | | | 7 |
| Libya | | | | | | R1 | R1 | | | R1 | | 3 |
| Morocco | | | | | | | R1 | R1 | QF | QF | | 4 |
| Mozambique | | | | | | | | R1 | | | | 1 |
| Nigeria | | R1 | | | | | | | | | | 1 |
| Zimbabwe | R1 | | | | | | | | | | | 1 |

== Sponsorship ==
In July 2016, Total has secured an eight-year sponsorship package from the Confederation of African Football (CAF) to support 10 of its principal competitions. Due to this sponsorship, the Africa Futsal Cup of Nations is named "Total Africa Futsal Cup of Nations".
