= Dina Kenitra Futsal Club =

Moroccan futsal club

- Full name: Dina Kenitra Futsal Club
- Founded: 2011
- Ground: Al Wahda Hall, Kénitra
- Capacity: 2,500
- Chairman: Moussa Talmoust
- Manager: Driss Talmoust
- League: Futsal D1
- Website: https://www.dinakenitrafc.ma

The Dina Kenitra Futsal Club (Arabic: نادي دينا القنيطرة لكرة القدم داخل الصالات) a professional futsal club based in Kenitra, Morocco, that competes in Futsal D1.

== History ==
=== Beginnings (2011-2014) ===
Dina Kenitra FC was founded in 2011 in Kenitra and quickly established itself as a major player in the Gharb League. The club was created to structure the practice of futsal in Kénitra, driven by Driss Talmoust, a central figure in its establishment. Before founding Dina Kenitra, Talmoust played and managed another local club, Dynamo Kenitra, alongside Aymene Derkaoui, who was the captain at that time.

However, disagreements regarding management and strategic directions led Talmoust to create a new entity: Dina Kenitra FC. This club adopted an innovative approach from the start, aspiring for international reach while being rooted in the local community.

Dina Kenitra officially joined the Gharb League for the 2011–2012 season, with a roster mainly composed of young players from Kénitra's neighborhoods. In its early seasons, the club achieved good results, quickly advancing in regional competitions. In 2014, Dina Kenitra won the Gharb League, marking a decisive step in its ascent. This title allowed the club to move up to the national second division (D2) for the 2014–2015 season.

=== Rapid rise in D2, then D1 (2014-2020) ===
In its first D2 season, Dina Kenitra built on its previous successes. The team, well-organized under Talmoust's guidance, managed to reach the top of D2 and won the championship at the end of the season, earning promotion to Futsal D1, the most prestigious futsal league in Morocco.

During the 2015–2016 season, Dina Kenitra FC finished 5th in D1, an impressive performance for a promoted team, thanks in part to emerging local talents such as Otmane Boumezou and Mohamed Nessis, who quickly distinguished themselves by their performances.

However, after the following season (2016–2017), disagreements arose between Talmoust and some players. A notable event was the departure of Ayoub El Ouandouri, another influential player who, dissatisfied with the club's direction, decided to leave Dina Kenitra. Boumezou and Nessis, close to El Ouandouri, also followed suit, which directly affected the club's performance.

These departures weakened Dina Kenitra, prompting the club to rethink its strategy and rebuild its roster. The club ultimately finished in 10th place in D1 during the 2017–2018 season, resulting in relegation to D2.

After relegation, Dina Kenitra sought to quickly return to the top division. In the 2018–2019 season, the club finished as runner-up in D2, but the promotion rules allowed only one team to move up to D1. Therefore, Dina Kenitra remained in D2 for another season. In the 2019–2020 season, as Otman Idel-Aouad, a notable figure in the club since its inception, retired from futsal, the club again finished as vice-champion of D2, narrowly missing promotion for the second consecutive year.

In 2020, the Royal Moroccan Football Federation (FRMF) restructured the futsal competitions, allowing additional teams, including Dina Kenitra, to be promoted to D1. This reorganization marked the club's return to the elite of Moroccan futsal.

=== Professionalization (since 2020) ===
Upon its return to Futsal D1 for the 2020–2021 season, Dina Kenitra became more competitive and organized. The club recruited experienced players while continuing to rely on locally trained young talents. This season saw the emergence of players like Soufiane Lahlioui, who finished as the league's top scorer with 40 goals.

In the 2021–2022 season, Dina Kenitra faced challenges due to the COVID-19 pandemic, leading to an annulment of the league. Nevertheless, the club bounced back in the 2022–2023 season, finishing 5th and reaching the semi-finals of the Moroccan Cup, showcasing its competitive edge.

In 2023, the club continued to strengthen its presence in Moroccan futsal by achieving significant results and expanding its community engagement initiatives, aiming to inspire the next generation of futsal players in Kénitra and beyond.

== Sporting achievements ==
=== Titles and awards ===
Achievements of Dina Kenitra Futsal Club
Regional Competitions	National Competitions
Gharb League (1); Champion : 2014	D2 Championship (1); Champion : 2015; Runner-up : 2019 and 2020; Cup of the Throne; None

== Notable personalities ==
=== Management and coaches ===
At its creation in 2011, the club was chaired by Mohammed Bensaid, a former coach of Dynamo Kenitra and ex-Moroccan international. With his experience, Bensaid provided a solid organizational structure for Dina Kenitra, which competed in the Gharb League. Under his presidency, the club navigated its early seasons, achieving encouraging results despite limited resources. Bensaid prioritized the development of local youth players and the establishment of a competitive framework within Moroccan futsal. He held this position until the middle of the 2012–2013 season.

During this time, the club went through a difficult period marked by internal tensions and declining sports results. Moussa Talmoust, already involved in managing the club as a player and founder, took over the presidency in 2013 as Bensaid decided to focus on an administrative role. Talmoust thus became president and coach of Dina Kenitra, a dual responsibility he undertook to revive the club. Under his leadership, the club underwent significant internal reorganization and strategic recruitment. Talmoust, with his experience and commitment to Moroccan futsal, led the club to rise to D2 and subsequently to Futsal D1.

=== Notable players ===
Dina Kenitra FC has seen several notable players who have marked the club's history and distinguished themselves by being selected for the Morocco national futsal team. Among them, Mohamed Nessis and Otmane Boumezou, who played for the club between 2015 and 2017, established themselves as key players before their departure. Anas Taybi, present from 2017 to 2019, and Soufiane Lahlioui, active from 2018 to 2022, also contributed significantly, particularly Lahlioui, who finished as the league's top scorer in the 2020–2021 season with 40 goals.

Other players like Anas Bakkali (2020–2023), Bilal Hamidouch (since 2022), as well as Ayoub El Ouandouri, Amine El Hiss, and Hamza Errouass have also showcased their talents while representing Morocco at the international level, further enhancing Dina Kenitra's reputation on the national stage.

== Current squad ==
As of 12 November 2025

#	Position	Name	Nationality
1	Goalkeeper	Azzedine Tale (c)	(Morocco)
12	Goalkeeper	Alaeddine Rahoui	(Morocco)
22	Goalkeeper	Zakaria El Mouedene	(Morocco)
2	Midfielder	Badr Barious	(Morocco)
3	Midfielder	Mohammed Belqasmi	(Morocco)
4	Midfielder	Tarik Elmissaoui	(Morocco)
6	Midfielder	Moaad Hame	(Morocco)
7	Midfielder	Issam Moumen	(Morocco)
8	Midfielder	Soufiane Ja	(Morocco)
9	Midfielder	Taha Amlaki	(Morocco)
10	Midfielder	Bilal Tayaaeddine	(Morocco)
11	Midfielder	Souhail Sliten	(Morocco)
14	Midfielder	Othmane Sitel	(Morocco)
17	Midfielder	Montasser Naia	(Morocco)
—	Goalkeeper	Mohammed Belkhoukh	(Morocco)

== Structure, venue, and image ==
Dina Kenitra FC's home matches are held at the Al Wahda Hall, located in Kénitra. The sports infrastructure is shared by all high-level futsal teams in Kénitra. With a capacity of 2,500, Al Wahda Hall provides an ideal setting for hosting matches, creating an intense and lively atmosphere during important games.

== Partnerships ==
In December 2023, Dina Kenitra FC signed a partnership with the Dutch club Tigers Roermond.
