= Mozambique national futsal team =

Mozambique
- Nickname(s): Os Mambas
- Association: Mozambican Football Federation
- Confederation: CAF (Africa)
- FIFA code: MOZ
- FIFA ranking: 78 ▲7 (8 May 2026)
Home colours	Away colours

First international
- Egypt 10–2 Mozambique (Cairo, Egypt; 27 August 2004)

Biggest win
- Canada 0–9 Mozambique (Joinville, Brazil; 22 October 2007)

Biggest defeat
- Brazil 15–3 Mozambique (Cali, Colombia; 17 September 2016)

FIFA World Cup
- Appearances: 1 (First in 2016)
- Best result: Group stage (2016)

Africa Futsal Cup of Nations
- Appearances: 4 (First in 2004)
- Best result: (silver) Runners-up (2004)

Grand Prix de Futsal
- Appearances: 4 (First in 2007)
- Best result: 11th place (2007)

The Mozambique national futsal team, nicknamed Os Mambas, represents Mozambique in international and African futsal competitions. It is affiliated to the Mozambican Football Federation.

== Tournament records ==
*Denotes draws include knockout matches decided on penalty kicks.
**Gold background color indicates that the tournament was won.
***Red border color indicates tournament was held on home soil.

=== FIFA Futsal World Cup ===
FIFA World Cup record
Year	Round	Pld	W	D*	L	GS	GA	DIF
Netherlands 1989	Did not enter	–	–	–	–	–	–	–
Hong Kong 1992	Did not enter	–	–	–	–	–	–	–
Spain 1996	Did not enter	–	–	–	–	–	–	–
Guatemala 2000	Did not enter	–	–	–	–	–	–	–
Chinese Taipei 2004	Did not qualify	–	–	–	–	–	–	–
Brazil 2008	Did not qualify	–	–	–	–	–	–	–
Thailand 2012	Did not qualify	–	–	–	–	–	–	–
Colombia 2016	Group stage	3	0	0	3	7	22	–15
Lithuania 2021	Did not qualify	–	–	–	–	–	–	–
Uzbekistan 2024	Did not qualify	–	–	–	–	–	–	–
Total	1/10	3	0	0	3	7	22	–15

=== Africa Futsal Cup of Nations ===
African Championship Record
Year	Round	Pld	W	D*	L	GS	GA	DIF
Egypt 1996	Did not enter	–	–	–	–	–	–	–
Egypt 2000	Did not enter	–	–	–	–	–	–	–
2004	Runners-up	6	5	0	1	19	13	+6
Libya 2008	Fourth place	6	2	1	3	27	19	+12
Burkina Faso 2011	Cancelled	-	-	-	-	-	-	-
South Africa 2016	Third place	5	2	2	1	24	19	+15
Morocco 2020	Group stage	3	0	0	3	9	17	-8
Morocco 2024	Did not qualify	-	-	-	-	-	-	-
Total	4/7	20	9	3	8	79	68	+11

=== Grand Prix de Futsal ===
Grand Prix de Futsal Record
Year	Round	Pld	W	D*	L	GS	GA	DIF
Brazil 2005	Did not enter	–	–	–	–	–	–	–
Brazil 2006	Did not enter	–	–	–	–	–	–	–
Brazil 2007	11th place	3	1	0	2	12	16	–4
Brazil 2008	12th place	6	2	1	3	14	21	–7
Brazil 2009	14th place	6	1	1	4	18	30	–12
Brazil 2010	Did not enter	–	–	–	–	–	–	–
Brazil 2011	12th place	6	1	0	5	16	32	–16
Brazil 2013	Did not enter	–	–	–	–	–	–	–
Brazil 2014	Did not enter	–	–	–	–	–	–	–
Brazil 2015	Did not enter	–	–	–	–	–	–	–
Brazil 2018	To be determined	–	–	–	–	–	–	–
Total	4/11	21	5	2	14	60	99	–39

== See also ==
- Mozambique national football team
