= 2024 Futsal Africa Cup of Nations =

كأس أمم إفريقيا لكرة القدم داخل الصالات 2024

Tournament details
- Host country: Morocco
- City: Rabat
- Dates: 11–21 April
- Teams: 8 (from 1 confederation)
- Venue: 2 (in 1 host city)

Final positions
- Champions: Morocco (3rd title)
- Runners-up: Angola
- Third place: Libya
- Fourth place: Egypt

Tournament statistics
- Matches played: 16
- Goals scored: 155 (9.69 per match)
- Top scorer(s): (Angola) Chico (Angola) Hélber (Morocco) Soufian Charraoui (7 goals each)
- Best player: (Morocco) Bilal Bakkali
- Best goalkeeper: (Morocco) Abdelkrim Anbia
- Fair play award: Ghana

The 2024 Futsal Africa Cup of Nations was the eighth edition of the Futsal Africa Cup of Nations, the quadrennial international futsal championship organised by the Confederation of African Football (CAF) for the men's national teams of Africa. The tournament was first planned to be held in Mozambique. However Mozambique declined after, to host the competition. Morocco announced the organization of the tournament for the second time in a row.

Same as previous editions, the tournament acted as the CAF qualifiers for the FIFA Futsal World Cup (except for 2012 when a separate qualifying tournament was organized as the 2011 African Futsal Championship was cancelled). The top three teams of the tournament will qualify for the 2024 FIFA Futsal World Cup in Uzbekistan as the CAF representatives.

Morocco are the defending champions.

== Qualification ==
=== Qualified teams ===
The following eight teams will qualify for the final tournament. The Draw took place on 23 December 2023 in the CAF Headquarters. The qualifiers will take place from 29 January to 11 February 2024. Angola, Egypt and Morocco who are all the highest ranked nations in the competition gained automatic entry.

Team	Appearance	Previous best performance
Angola	4th	Third place (2020)
Egypt	7th	Champions (1996, 2000, 2004)
Morocco (hosts)	6th	Champions (2016, 2020)
Mauritania	1st	Debut
Namibia	1st	Debut
Ghana	2nd	Runners-up (1996)
Zambia	3rd	Fourth place (2016)
Libya	5th	Champions (2008)

== Venues ==
The matches were played at two venues in Rabat.

- Salle Moulay Abdellah
- Salle Ibn Yassine

== Squads ==
Each squad can contained a maximum of 14 players.

== Group stage ==
The top two teams of each group will advance to the semi finals.

=== Group A ===
Pos	Team	Pld	W	D	L	GF	GA	GD	Pts	Qualification
1	Morocco (H)	3	3	0	0	26	5	+21	9	Advance to knockout stage
2	Angola	3	2	0	1	21	13	+8	6	Advance to knockout stage
3	Zambia	3	1	0	2	10	23	−13	3	
4	Ghana	3	0	0	3	8	24	−16	0	

Source: CAF
(H) Hosts
11 April 2024
17:00

Ghana	2–5	Zambia
Nakotey 7'33"; Boye 30'57"	Report (CAF)	Banda 18'54"; Chinyama 21'26"; Phiri 22'38"; Mwaliteta 33'33"; Simwami 38'14"

Salle Moulay Abdellah, Rabat
Referee: (Egypt)
11 April 2024
20:00

Morocco	5–2	Angola
Raiss El Fenni 7'13"; Charraoui 13'34", 15'46", 15'59"; El Ayyane 20'56"	Report (CAF)	Hélber 6'52"; Anderson 38'49"

Salle Moulay Abdellah, Rabat
Referee: Aymen Kammoun (Tunisia)

13 April 2024
17:00

Zambia	5–8	Angola
Banda 18'12"; Phiri 31'43", 36'28", 37'14"; Chinyama 34'19"	Report (CAF)	Lungu 23'08" (o.g.); Chico 29'42", 35'32", 39'07"; Pesado 30'54"; Hélber 32'16", 34'58"; Anderson 38'37"

Salle Moulay Abdellah, Rabat
13 April 2024
20:00

Morocco	8–3	Ghana
Jouad 0'14", 37'55"; El Mesrar 2'39", 10'40"; Charraoui 7'50", 16'16"; Bakkali 31'03" (pen.); Bouzid 34'21"	Report (CAF)	Arthur 5'41"; Boye 13'26", 16'32"

Salle Moulay Abdellah, Rabat

15 April 2024
20:00

Angola	11–3	Ghana
Braúlio 0'28", 22'34", 34'56"; Jô 0'51"; Arroz Doce 10'43", 25'27"; Chico 16'47" (pen.), 19'54", 23'36"; Hélber 30'04"; Kaluanda 32'27"	Report (CAF)	Adérito 8'13" (o.g.); Nakotey 14'53"; Arthur 38'37"

Salle Ibn Yassine, Rabat
15 April 2024
20:00

Zambia	0–13	Morocco
	Report (CAF)	El Mesrar 3'28"; Bakkali 4'03", 21'49"; Amazal 6'05"; Charraoui 6'30", 7'12"; Raiss El Fenni 10'54"; El Ayyane 16'53", 17'25"; Elidrissi 27'07"; Dahani 30'06"; Simwami 34'27" (o.g.); Jouad 39'58

Salle Moulay Abdellah, Rabat

=== Group B ===
Pos	Team	Pld	W	D	L	GF	GA	GD	Pts	Qualification
1	Egypt	3	3	0	0	21	9	+12	9	Advance to knockout stage
2	Libya	3	2	0	1	16	13	+3	6	Advance to knockout stage
3	Mauritania	3	1	0	2	15	16	−1	3	
4	Namibia	3	0	0	3	12	26	−14	0	

Source: CAF
12 April 2024
17:00

Egypt	4–0	Libya
Koki 9'11", 19'30"; Said 28'53"; Eissa 39'11"	Report (CAF)

Salle Moulay Abdellah, Rabat
Referee: Khalid Hnich (Morocco)
12 April 2024
20:00

Namibia	4–5	Mauritania
Salote 26'50", 38'43"; Mathys 29'30"; Haikali 33'23"	Report (CAF)	Bouhoumadi 4'13"; Sylla 12'28", 12'54"; Drame 17'54"; M'Hamed 25'23"

Salle Moulay Abdellah, Rabat
Referee: José Katchingavisa (Angola)

14 April 2024
17:00

Egypt	10–3	Namibia
Eissa 5'06"; Abdelhalim 12'23", 39'23"; Koki 17'41", 27'40"; Ramadan 20'50"; Moawad 30'55"; Aly 37'55", 39'04", 39'58"	Report (CAF)	Willemse 11'35"; Jager 12'56"; Usurua 18'08"

Salle Moulay Abdellah, Rabat
Referee: Pedro-Luis Ndong Ondo (Equatorial Guinea)
14 April 2024
20:00

Mauritania	4–5	Libya
N'Diel 8'33", 36'33"; Sow 22'15"; Bouhoumadi 33'51"	Report (CAF)	Shoshan 9'29", 16'53", 17'36"; Said 10'47"; Zreeg 32'41"

Salle Moulay Abdellah, Rabat

16 April 2024
20:00

Mauritania	6–7	Egypt
N'Diel 3'24"; M'Hamed 9'20"; Sow 16'02"; Chendhoura 26'50", 32'03", 37'52"	Report (CAF)	Koki 12'50", 27'26"; Abdelhalim 21'21", 29'57"; Moawad 22'26"; Eissa 28'03"; Said 35'04"

Salle Moulay Abdellah, Rabat
16 April 2024
20:00

Libya	11–5	Namibia
Said 0'47", 23'00"; Alajnaf 6'40", 39'39"; Zreeg 9'46", 27'22"; Shoshan 21'21", 22'23"; Elderwish 21'46"; Alghoul 35'34", 36'05"	Report (CAF)	Kamatuka 2'19"; Mathys 18'10", 30'05"; Salote 19'42"; Solunga 24'18"

Salle Ibn Yassine, Rabat

== Knockout stage ==
In the knockout stage, extra time and penalty shoot-out are used to decide the winner if necessary.

=== Bracket ===
Semi-finals
19 April
Morocco	6
Libya	0
19 April
Egypt	3
Angola	7

Final
21 April
Morocco	5
Angola	1
Third place match
21 April
Libya (p)	2 (3)
Egypt	2 (1)

=== Semi-finals ===
Winners qualify for 2024 FIFA Futsal World Cup.

19 April 2024
17:00

Egypt	3–7	Angola
Eissa 1'42", 18'28" (pen.); Said 36'06"	Report (CAF)	Chico 1'11"; Pesado 13'28"; Anderson 13'17; Gomito 34'27"; Hélber 37'29", 38'07", 38'58"

Salle Moulay Abdellah, Rabat
Referee: Abel Junior Kouamé (Ivory Coast)
19 April 2024
20:00

Morocco	6–0	Libya
El Mesrar 2'43", 21'51"; Jouad 5'04"; Bakkali 11'53", 28'12"; El Ayyane 16'49"	Report (CAF)

Salle Moulay Abdellah, Rabat
Referee: Eric Elingui Mindjih (Cameroon)

=== Third place match ===
Winner qualifies for 2024 FIFA Futsal World Cup.

21 April 2024
17:00

Libya	2–2	Egypt
Said 22'26"; Alghoul 37'03"	Report (CAF)	Ramadan 14'47", 18'14"
Penalties
Said (penalty scored); Rashid (penalty scored); Zreeg (penalty scored)	3–1	(penalty scored) Farag; (penalty missed) Eissa; (penalty missed) Aly; (penalty missed) Said

Salle Moulay Abdellah, Rabat
Referee: Khalid Hnich (Morocco)

=== Final ===
21 April 2024
20:00

Morocco	5–1	Angola
Borite 5'39"; Raiss El Fenni 15'07"; El Mesrar 16'35"; El Ayyane 30'23"; Bakkali 34'26" (pen.)	Report (CAF)	Adérito 6'14"

Salle Moulay Abdellah, Rabat
Referee: Mohamed Youssef (Egypt)

== Goalscorers ==
There were 155 goals scored in 16 matches, for an average of 9.69 goals per match.

7 goals

- (Angola) Chico
- (Angola) Hélber
- (Morocco) Soufian Charraoui

6 goals

- (Egypt) Koki
- (Morocco) Soufiane El Mesrar
- (Morocco) Bilal Bakkali

5 goals

- (Egypt) Alaa Eissa
- (Libya) Ali Shoshan
- (Morocco) Anas El Ayyane

4 goals

- (Egypt) Khaled Abdelhalim
- (Libya) Mohamed Said
- (Morocco) Youssef Jouad
- (Zambia) Wiseman Phiri

3 goals

- (Angola) Braúlio
- (Angola) Anderson
- (Egypt) Ahmed Aly
- (Egypt) Mohamed Said
- (Egypt) Essam Ramadan
- (Ghana) Philip Nii Boye
- (Libya) Mohamed Zreeg
- (Libya) Suhayb Alghoul
- (Mauritania) Yacoub N'Diel
- (Mauritania) Ely Chendhoura Ahmed Aidda
- (Morocco) Idriss Raiss El Fenni
- (Namibia) Remario Mathys
- (Namibia) Ken Salote

2 goals

- (Angola) Arroz Doce
- (Angola) Pesado
- (Egypt) Abdelrahman Moawad
- (Ghana) Emmanuel Nakotey
- (Ghana) Prince Arthur
- (Libya) Ahmed Alajnaf
- (Mauritania) Yakhouba Sylla
- (Mauritania) Abderhemane Bouhoumadi
- (Mauritania) M'Hamed M'Hamed
- (Mauritania) Dioncounda Sow
- (Zambia) Patrick Banda
- (Zambia) Francis Chinyam

1 goal

- (Angola) Jô
- (Angola) Kaluanda
- (Angola) Gomito
- (Angola) Adérito
- (Libya) Suliman Elderwish
- (Morocco) Khalid Bouzid
- (Morocco) Ismail Amazal
- (Morocco) Othmane Elidrissi
- (Morocco) Anas Dahani
- (Morocco) Soufiane Borite
- (Mauritania) Moudery Drame
- (Namibia) George Haikalia
- (Namibia) Reginald Willemse
- (Namibia) Rowen Jager
- (Namibia) Usurua Ryiena Riya
- (Namibia) Nanguei Kamatuka
- (Namibia) Luis Solunga
- (Zambia) Mbalika Mwaliteta
- (Zambia) Jackson Simwami

1 own goal

- (Angola) Adérito (against Ghana)
- (Zambia) Prince Lungu (against Angola)
- (Zambia) Jackson Simwami (against Morocco)

== Qualified teams for FIFA Futsal World Cup ==
The following three teams from CAF qualified for the 2024 FIFA Futsal World Cup.

Team	Qualified on	Previous appearances in FIFA Futsal World Cup
Angola	19 April 2024	1 (2021)
Morocco	19 April 2024	3 (2012, 2016, 2021)
Libya	21 April 2024	2 (2008, 2012)

== Ranking ==
Rank	Team	M	W	D	L	GF	GA	GD	Points
1	Morocco	5	5	0	0	37	6	+31	15
2	Angola	5	3	0	2	29	21	+8	9
3	Libya	5	2	1	2	18	21	-3	7
4	Egypt	5	3	1	1	26	18	+8	10
5	Mauritania	3	1	0	2	15	16	−1	3
6	Zambia	3	1	0	2	10	23	−13	3
7	Namibia	3	0	0	3	12	26	−14	0
8	Ghana	3	0	0	3	8	24	−16	0
