= 2024 Futsal Africa Cup of Nations squads =

The following is a list of squads for each national team which competed at the 2024 Futsal Africa Cup of Nations. The tournament took place in Morocco, between 11 and 21 April 2024. It was the eighth competition organised by the Confederation of African Football.

The eight national teams involved in the tournament were required to register a squad of maximum 14 players, minimum two of whom must be goalkeepers. Only players in these squads were eligible to take part in the tournament. CAF published the final lists with squad numbers on their website on 8 April 2024.

The full squad listings are below. The age listed for each player is on 11 April 2024, the first day of the tournament. The nationality for each club reflects the national association (not the league) to which the club is affiliated. A flag is included for coaches who are of a different nationality than their own national team.

== Group A ==
=== Angola ===
The final squad was announced on 31 March 2024.

Head coach: (Portugal) Marcos Antunes

| No. | Pos. | Player | Date of birth (age) | Club |
|---|---|---|---|---|
| 1 | GK | Micael Gabriel | 4 August 2002 (aged 21) | (Angola) JCY de Luanda |
| 2 | DF | Osvaldo de Carvalho | 3 July 1997 (aged 26) | (Angola) Maculusso |
| 3 | DF | Reveldinho Santos | 9 May 2000 (aged 23) | (Angola) 4 de Julho |
| 4 | FW | Gaspar Celestino | 22 June 2001 (aged 22) | (Angola) JCY de Luanda |
| 5 | FW | Braúlio Fontoura | 6 August 1994 (aged 29) | (Angola) RNT de Luanda |
| 6 | FW | Anderson Fortes | 20 January 2004 (aged 20) | (Portugal) Leões de Porto Salvo |
| 7 | MF | Osvaldo Kaluanda | 8 March 1995 (aged 29) | (Angola) JCY de Luanda |
| 8 | FW | Francisco Gabriel | 30 May 1997 (aged 26) | (Angola) Clinica Sagrada Esperança |
| 9 | FW | Helber Garcia | 27 August 2000 (aged 23) | (Angola) Maculusso |
| 10 | FW | Jô Cambangula | 15 April 1998 (aged 25) | (Portugal) Nun’Alvares |
| 11 | FW | Adérito Santos | 3 August 2001 (aged 22) | (Angola) JCY de Luanda |
| 12 | GK | Nelson Pereira | 19 September 1990 (aged 33) | (Angola) Maculusso |
| 13 | DF | Paulo Ricardo | 10 September 2001 (aged 22) | (Angola) Maculusso |
| 14 | DF | Dinilson Delme | 5 May 2003 (aged 20) | (Angola) RNT de Luanda |

=== Ghana ===
Head coach: Philip Boakye

| No. | Pos. | Player | Date of birth (age) | Club |
|---|---|---|---|---|
| 1 | GK | Raphael Tsigbe | 31 October 2003 (aged 20) | (Ghana) San Siro FC |
| 2 | DF | Prince Arthur | 8 March 2000 (aged 24) | (Ghana) Blessed Kickers FC |
| 3 | DF | Rafael Donu | 29 July 1996 (aged 27) | (Ghana) San Siro FC |
| 4 | DF | Stephen Sowah | 18 August 2003 (aged 20) | (Ghana) Gadu FC |
| 5 | DF | Emmanuel Pako | 9 May 2003 (aged 20) | (Ghana) Auxano FC |
| 6 | FW | Kelvin Aboagye | 2 August 2006 (aged 17) | (Ghana) AMG FC |
| 7 | DF | Mohammed Musah | 30 December 2001 (aged 22) | (Ghana) Future Stars FC |
| 8 | MF | Tsatsu Savior | 15 April 2003 (aged 20) | (Ghana) San Siro FC |
| 9 | FW | Emmanuel Ansong | 10 October 2007 (aged 16) | (Ghana) Blessed Kickers FC |
| 10 | FW | Philip Nii Boye | 4 January 2004 (aged 20) | (Ghana) Gadu FC |
| 11 | MF | Timothy Kantanka | 17 November 1995 (aged 28) | (Ghana) AMG FC |
| 12 | GK | Michael Ruttmern | 31 December 1995 (aged 28) | (Ghana) AMG FC |
| 13 | DF | Robert Ayettey | 13 October 2002 (aged 21) | (Ghana) Stitch In Time FC |
| 14 | DF | Samuel Koranteng | 16 February 2005 (aged 19) | (Malaysia) Sabah FC |

=== Morocco ===
The final squad was announced on 29 March 2024.

Head coach: Hicham Dguig

| No. | Pos. | Player | Date of birth (age) | Club |
|---|---|---|---|---|
| 1 | GK | Abdelkrim Anbia | 8 April 1989 (aged 35) | (Morocco) Faucon Agadir |
| 2 | MF | Anas Dahani | 14 December 1999 (aged 24) | (Morocco) Faucon Agadir |
| 3 | DF | Anás El Ayyane | 30 October 1992 (aged 31) | (Spain) Ribera Navarra FS |
| 4 | MF | Youssef Jouad | 30 December 1999 (aged 24) | (Morocco) SCC Mohammédia |
| 5 | DF | Othmane El Idrissi | 7 August 1999 (aged 24) | (Morocco) Loukous Ksar El Kabir |
| 6 | DF | Soufiane Borite | 11 December 1992 (aged 31) | (Finland) FC Kemi |
| 7 | MF | Ismail Amazal | 10 October 1996 (aged 27) | (Morocco) Faucon Agadir |
| 8 | DF | Soufian Charraoui | 15 November 1996 (aged 27) | (Morocco) Faucon Agadir |
| 9 | FW | Otmane Boumezou | 8 July 1992 (aged 31) | (Morocco) Loukous Ksar El Kabir |
| 10 | FW | Soufiane El Mesrar | 5 June 1990 (aged 33) | (France) Étoile Lavalloise |
| 11 | MF | Bilal Bakkali | 24 February 1993 (aged 31) | (France) Étoile Lavalloise |
| 12 | GK | Mohammed Cheridou | 20 September 1999 (aged 24) | (Morocco) Oussoud Khabazat |
| 13 | DF | Khalid Bouzid | 20 April 1998 (aged 25) | (Spain) Industrias Santa Coloma |
| 14 | FW | Idriss Raiss El-Fenni | 9 May 1996 (aged 27) | (Morocco) Faucon Agadir |

=== Zambia ===
The final squad was announced on 2 April 2024.

Head coach: (South Africa) Andrea Cristoforetti

| No. | Pos. | Player | Date of birth (age) | Club |
|---|---|---|---|---|
| 1 | GK | Jackson Chitungu | 24 June 1991 (aged 32) | (Zambia) Lusaka Automotive |
| 2 | DF | Chota Chileshe | 9 August 1997 (aged 26) | (Zambia) Lusaka Automotive |
| 3 | DF | Michelo Kaampwe | 1 May 1996 (aged 27) | (Zambia) Mudi Stars |
| 4 | FW | Patrick Banda | 3 October 2001 (aged 22) | (Zambia) Lusaka Automotive |
| 5 | DF | Hendricks Chisanga | 28 September 2001 (aged 22) | (Zambia) Mudi Stars |
| 6 | FW | James Mwila | 19 February 1999 (aged 25) | (Zambia) Lusaka Automotive |
| 7 | FW | Mbalika Mwaliteta | 26 June 1995 (aged 28) | (Zambia) Kafue Saints |
| 8 | MF | Francis Chinyama | 25 February 2002 (aged 22) | (Zambia) Lusaka Automotive |
| 9 | FW | Wiseman Phiri | 29 January 1999 (aged 25) | (Zambia) Lusaka Automotive |
| 10 | MF | Prince Lungu | 1 June 2000 (aged 23) | (Zambia) Lusaka Automotive |
| 11 | FW | Boniface Ndhlovu | 2 May 1997 (aged 26) | (Zambia) Mudi Stars |
| 12 | GK | Evaristo Mulolo | 22 June 2005 (aged 18) | (Zambia) Lusaka Automotive |
| 13 | MF | Lackson Daka | 26 August 1998 (aged 25) | (Zambia) Kitwe Bullet |
| 14 | DF | Jackson Simwami | 21 June 1997 (aged 26) | (Zambia) Lusaka Automotive |

== Group B ==
=== Egypt ===
The final squad was announced on 2 April 2024.

Head coach: Gehad Arafa

| No. | Pos. | Player | Date of birth (age) | Club |
|---|---|---|---|---|
| 1 | GK | Gamal Abdelnaser | 20 January 1993 (aged 31) | (Serbia) KMF Novi Pazar |
| 2 | GK | Mahmoud Abdel Wahab | 26 March 1994 (aged 30) | (Egypt) El Alameen |
| 3 | FW | Abdelrahman Eid | 25 December 1993 (aged 30) | (Iraq) Mawarid Maaiyah |
| 4 | DF | Alaa Eissa | 29 May 1999 (aged 24) | (Saudi Arabia) Magd |
| 5 | FW | Abdelrahman Sayed | 6 September 1992 (aged 31) | (Saudi Arabia) Al Ard |
| 6 | MF | Mohamed Talaat | 15 February 2000 (aged 24) | (Saudi Arabia) Al Ard |
| 7 | DF | Khaled Walid | 25 July 2002 (aged 21) | (Egypt) NBE |
| 8 | DF | Ahmed Aly | 7 December 2000 (aged 23) | (Egypt) NBE |
| 9 | FW | Mohamed Koki | 25 November 1994 (aged 29) | (Egypt) El Alameen |
| 10 | MF | Essam Alaa | 1 September 1994 (aged 29) | (Saudi Arabia) Al Nassr Futsal |
| 11 | FW | Mohamed Said | 30 September 1995 (aged 28) | (Egypt) El Alameen |
| 12 | FW | Mostafa Eid | 17 August 1992 (aged 31) | (Saudi Arabia) Massada |
| 13 | GK | Ahmed Fekry Saleh | 27 December 1994 (aged 29) | Egypt Telecom |
| 14 | MF | Khaled Maradona | 12 September 1994 (aged 29) | (Saudi Arabia) Al Assarawath |

=== Libya ===
Head coach: (Spain) Ricardo Iñiguez

| No. | Pos. | Player | Date of birth (age) | Club |
|---|---|---|---|---|
| 1 | GK | Ziyad Azeez | 12 October 2000 (aged 23) | (Libya) Al-Ittihad |
| 2 | DF | Ahmed Abdelaziz | 1 September 1994 (aged 29) | (Morocco) RS Berkane |
| 3 | DF | Suhayb Al-Ghoul | 29 January 1996 (aged 28) | (Libya) Al-Ittihad |
| 4 | DF | Mohamed Zreeg | 28 April 1991 (aged 32) | (Libya) Olympic |
| 5 | MF | Suliman El-Derwish | 15 December 1990 (aged 33) | (Libya) Asswehly |
| 6 | MF | Husam Al-Werffali | 3 December 1993 (aged 30) | (Libya) Al-Ittihad |
| 7 | FW | Ahmed Mohamed Al-Ajnaf | 14 December 2000 (aged 23) | (Libya) Olympic |
| 8 | MF | Mohamed Said | 1 February 1995 (aged 29) | (Libya) Asswehly |
| 9 | FW | Ali Shoshan | 17 September 1992 (aged 31) | (Libya) Al Ahli |
| 10 | FW | Ahmed Al-Yumni | 3 June 1994 (aged 29) | (Libya) Olympic |
| 11 | FW | Abdulhakim Rashid | 20 January 1998 (aged 26) | (Libya) Olympic |
| 12 | GK | Ayad Al-Wansi | 22 June 1997 (aged 26) | (Libya) Olympic |
| 13 | FW | Ibrahim Lemhammel | 25 August 1999 (aged 24) | (Libya) Asswehly |
| 14 | MF | Mohamed Suleiman Ghaeb | 27 September 1988 (aged 35) | (Libya) Al-Ittihad |

=== Mauritania ===
Head coach: (Morocco) Abdallah Selami

| No. | Pos. | Player | Date of birth (age) | Club |
|---|---|---|---|---|
| 1 | GK | Mohamed Imam Saff | 8 October 1996 (aged 27) | (Mauritania) Chemal FC |
| 2 | FW | Brahim Mohamedel El-Abd | 23 October 1995 (aged 28) | (Mauritania) FC Nouadhibou |
| 3 | DF | Ely El-Ghadhi | 3 December 1991 (aged 32) | (Mauritania) FC Arafat |
| 4 | DF | Yacoub N'Diel | 18 February 1997 (aged 27) | (Mauritania) Hala Rim |
| 5 | DF | Moudery Drame | 22 June 1994 (aged 29) | (France) Neuilly Futsal Club 92 |
| 6 | MF | Askeiry El-Bekay | 3 February 1998 (aged 26) | (Mauritania) Hala Rim |
| 7 | MF | M'hamed | 23 March 1999 (aged 25) | (Mauritania) Gendrim |
| 8 | MF | Dioncounda Sow | 7 April 1995 (aged 29) | (France) Torcy Futsal |
| 9 | FW | Abderhemane Bouhoumadi | 18 December 1991 (aged 32) | (Mauritania) Chenaghitta |
| 10 | MF | Abd Daym Khouna | 17 June 1999 (aged 24) | (Mauritania) Chenaghitta |
| 11 | FW | Yakhouba Sylla | 15 January 1999 (aged 25) | (France) Torcy Futsal |
| 12 | GK | Cheikh Tourad | 10 January 2003 (aged 21) | (Mauritania) Chenaghitta |
| 13 | MF | Ely Chendhoura | 22 November 2002 (aged 21) | (Mauritania) Jeunesse du Ksar |
| 14 | MF | Cheikh Elbou Hweibib | 13 August 1994 (aged 29) | (Mauritania) FC Nouadhibou |

=== Namibia ===
The final squad was announced on 4 April 2024.

Head coach: Ryan Jago

| No. | Pos. | Player | Date of birth (age) | Club |
|---|---|---|---|---|
| 1 | GK | Riya Usurua | 7 April 2004 (aged 20) | (Namibia) Ballers |
| 2 | DF | Donald Modise | 26 May 1994 (aged 29) | (Namibia) Ballers |
| 3 | DF | Nanguei Kamatuka | 3 November 2001 (aged 22) | (Namibia) Windhoek Futsal |
| 4 | MF | Reginald Willemse | 29 January 1997 (aged 27) | (Namibia) Selecao |
| 5 | DF | Elroi Drotsky | 20 May 2003 (aged 20) | (Namibia) Selecao |
| 6 | MF | Daniel Dausab | 31 July 1996 (aged 27) | (Namibia) Windhoek Futsal |
| 7 | FW | Ken Salote | 21 May 2003 (aged 20) | (Namibia) Quality |
| 8 | MF | Rowen Jager | 20 October 2004 (aged 19) | (Namibia) Ballers |
| 9 | FW | Remario Mathys | 8 January 2005 (aged 19) | (Namibia) Chile |
| 10 | MF | George Haikali | 22 November 1996 (aged 27) | (Namibia) Ballers |
| 11 | FW | Luis Solunga | 6 November 2002 (aged 21) | (Namibia) Quality |
| 12 | MF | Silas Matheus | 6 October 1996 (aged 27) | (Namibia) Patriots |
| 13 | MF | Bornface Siyanga | 5 August 1995 (aged 28) | (Namibia) Chile |
| 14 | GK | Cee-Jay Van Wyk | 7 May 1999 (aged 24) | (Namibia) Selecao |
