= Grand Prix de Futsal =

- Founded: 2005
- Region: International (FIFA)
- Teams: 5 (2018)
- Current champions: Brazil (10th title)
- Most championships: Brazil (10 titles)
- 2018 Grand Prix de Futsal

The Grand Prix de Futsal (Brazil International Futsal Cup) is an international futsal competition of the same kind of the FIFA Futsal World Cup but with invited nations and held annually in Brazil. It was first held in 2005.

== History ==
In 2007, the sixteen participating nations are divided in the first stage in four groups of four teams each. The nations play against each other once within their respective groups, and the two best placed teams of each group qualify to the second stage, which is the quarter-finals. The quarter-finals winners qualify to the semifinals. The semifinal winners play the final, while the losers play the third-place playoff.

Five teams took part in the 2018 tournament between 30 January and 4 February 2018.

After 2018 have some Brazil Futsal Cup with different names like Nations Cup or Intercontinental Cup or Brazil International Tournament. First time was held for women in 2019.

== Pre Grand Prix ==
=== FIFA Futsal Tournament ===
1986 Hungary: 1-HUN 2-NED 3- ITA 4- BEL 5-ESP 6-USA 7-PER 8- BRA

1987 Brazil: 1-PAR 2- BRA 3-NED 4- BEL 5-ESP 6-ARG 7-USA 8-POR

1987 Spain: 1-ESp 2- BEL 3-BRA / NED 5-HUN 6-POR 7-USA 8-ITA

Futsal Mundialito

=== Nations Cup ===
1997 Rio de Janeiro

2000 Rio de Janeiro

2002 Fortaleza

2003 São Bernardo do Campo

== Results ==
=== Men ===
#	Year	Host	Winner	Score	Runner-up	Third place	Score	Fourth place	Teams
1	2005; Details	Brusque, Brazil	Brazil	7 – 3	Colombia	Argentina	3 – 1	Uruguay	6
2	2006; Details	Caxias do Sul, Brazil	Brazil	5 – 3 (a.e.t.)	Italy	Croatia	0 – 0 (a.e.t.); 4 – 3 (p.s.o.)	Argentina	6
3	2007; Details	Lages / Joinville / Jaraguá do Sul, Brazil	Brazil	4 – 0	Iran	Argentina	5 – 4 (a.e.t.)	Hungary	15
4	2008; Details	Fortaleza, Brazil	Brazil	3 – 2	Argentina	Ukraine	5 – 4 (a.e.t.)	Paraguay	16
5	2009; Details	Anápolis / Goiânia, Brazil	Brazil	7 – 1	Iran	Romania	4 – 2	Czech Republic	16
6	2010; Details	Anápolis, Brazil	Spain	2 – 1	Brazil	Paraguay	5 – 3 (a.e.t.)	Iran	16
7	2011; Details	Manaus, Brazil	Brazil	2 – 1	Russia	Argentina	4 – 2	Iran	16
8	2013; Details	Maringá, Brazil	Brazil	3 – 3 (a.e.t.); 4 – 2 (p.s.o.)	Russia	Iran	6 – 2	Paraguay	8
9	2014; Details	São Bernardo, Brazil	Brazil	7 – 2	Colombia	Iran	10 – 4	Guatemala	6
10	2015; Details	Uberaba, Brazil	Brazil	4 – 3	Iran	Colombia	1 – 0	Paraguay	8
11	2018; Details	Brusque, Brazil	Brazil	4 – 2	Czech Republic	Uruguay	6 – 1	Costa Rica	5

- Nations Cup 2023: https://www.futsalplanet.com/news.aspx?id=905&pa=24
- Intercontinental Cup 2025: https://futsalplanet.com/news.aspx?id=1172&pa=1

=== Women ===
- 1st Women Grand Prix 2019: http://futsalplanet.com/news.aspx?id=345 - https://www.roon-ba.com/futsal/women/2019.html
- International Women's Futsal tournament 2023: https://www.futsalplanet.com/news.aspx?id=884&pa=26 - https://www.roon-ba.com/futsal/women/2023.html
- Brazil International Tournament 2024: https://www.futsalplanet.com/news.aspx?id=1055 - https://www.roon-ba.com/futsal/women/2024.html

== Performance ==
=== Men ===
Team	Champion	Runner-up	Third place	Fourth place
Brazil	10 (2005, 2006, 2007, 2008, 2009, 2011, 2013, 2014, 2015, 2018)	1 (2010)	–	–
Spain	1 (2010)	–	–	–
Iran	–	3 (2007, 2009, 2015)	2 (2013, 2014)	2 (2010, 2011)
Colombia	–	2 (2005, 2014)	1 (2015)	–
Russia	–	2 (2011, 2013)	–	–
Argentina	–	1 (2008)	3 (2005, 2007, 2011)	1 (2006)
Czech Republic	–	1 (2018)	–	1 (2009)
Italy	–	1 (2006)	–	–
Paraguay	–	–	1 (2010)	3 (2008, 2013, 2015)
Uruguay	–	–	1 (2018)	1 (2005)
Romania	–	–	1 (2009)	–
Ukraine	–	–	1 (2008)	–
Croatia	–	–	1 (2006)	–
Guatemala	–	–	–	1 (2014)
Hungary	–	–	–	1 (2007)
Costa Rica	–	–	–	1 (2018)

== Medals ==
=== Men (2005-2025) ===
Rank	Nation	Gold	Silver	Bronze	Total
1	Brazil	12	1	0	13
2	Spain	1	0	0	1
3	Iran	0	5	2	7
4	Colombia	0	2	1	3
5	Russia	0	2	0	2
6	Argentina	0	1	3	4
7	Czech Republic	0	1	0	1
7	Italy	0	1	0	1
9	Paraguay	0	0	2	2
10	Afghanistan	0	0	1	1
10	Croatia	0	0	1	1
10	Romania	0	0	1	1
10	Ukraine	0	0	1	1
10	Uruguay	0	0	1	1
Totals (14 entries)		13	13	13	39

=== Women (2019-2024) ===
Rank	Nation	Gold	Silver	Bronze	Total
1	Brazil	3	0	0	3
2	Paraguay	0	2	1	3
3	Argentina	0	1	1	2
4	Bolivia	0	0	1	1
Totals (4 entries)		3	3	3	9

== Participating nations ==
Legend

- 1st – Champions
- 2nd – Runners-up
- 3rd – Third place
- 4th – Fourth place
- 5th-16th – Fifth to Sixteenth place
- Q – Qualified for upcoming tournament

Team	2005	2006	2007	2008	2009	2010	2011	2013	2014	2015	2018	Years
Angola			13th	13th	16th		11th			7th		5
Argentina	3rd	4th	3rd	2nd	5th	7th	3rd	5th				8
Belgium			5th				13th				5th	3
Brazil	1st	1st	1st	1st	1st	2nd	1st	1st	1st	1st	1st	11
Canada			15th	16th								2
Chile		6th	14th	14th								3
Colombia	2nd			6th					2nd	3rd		4
Costa Rica					10th	12th	15th		5th		4th	5
Croatia		3rd		7th								2
Czech Republic		5th		8th	4th	8th	8th				2nd	6
Ecuador					15th							1
Egypt			8th	10th								2
Team	2005	2006	2007	2008	2009	2010	2011	2013	2014	2015	2018	Years
Guatemala					7th	11th	5th	6th	4th	6th		6
Hungary			4th		12th		10th					3
Iran			2nd		2nd	4th	4th	3rd	3rd	2nd		7
Italy		2nd				5th						2
Japan								8th				1
Libya						10th						1
Mozambique			11th	12th	14th		12th					4
Netherlands			10th			13th	9th					3
Paraguay	5th		12th	4th	8th	3rd	6th	4th		4th		8
Peru				15th	11th							2
Portugal						6th						1
Qatar						16th						1
Team	2005	2006	2007	2008	2009	2010	2011	2013	2014	2015	2018	Years
Romania					3rd	14th						2
Russia						9th	2nd	2nd				3
Serbia				5th				7th				2
Slovenia			6th									1
Spain						1st						1
Ukraine				3rd	6th							2
United States							16th					1
Uruguay	4th		7th	11th	13th		7th			5th	3rd	7
Uzbekistan			9th									1
Venezuela	6th			9th	9th							3
Vietnam									6th			1
Zambia						15th	14th			8th		3
Total	6	6	15	16	16	16	16	8	6	8	5	

== Summary (2005-2018) ==
=== Men (2005-2018) ===
Rank	Team	Part	M	W	D	L	GF	GA	GD	Points
1	Brazil	11	57	55	1	1	388	70	+318	163
2	Argentina	8	41	23	7	11	114	78	+36	76
3	Iran	7	38	24	3	11	154	102	+52	75
4	Paraguay	8	40	16	8	16	121	111	+10	56
5	Russia	3	17	13	2	2	79	29	+50	41
6	Uruguay	7	37	12	5	20	93	133	-40	38
10	Czech Republic	6	31	10	5	16	92	102	-10	35
7	Guatemala	6	30	9	4	17	70	127	-57	31
8	Colombia	4	17	10	0	7	41	41	0	30
13	Costa Rica	5	26	8	3	15	65	94	-29	27
9	Hungary	3	18	8	2	8	56	54	+2	26
11	Netherlands	3	15	7	3	5	50	41	+9	24
12	Belgium	3	16	7	3	6	60	72	-12	24
14	Ukraine	2	12	6	4	2	38	22	+16	22
15	Venezuela	3	15	6	3	6	32	41	-9	21
16	Italy	2	10	6	1	3	29	21	+8	19
17	Spain	1	6	6	0	0	35	9	+26	18
18	Angola	5	25	4	6	15	61	95	-34	18
19	Romania	2	12	5	2	5	30	43	-13	17
20	Mozambique	4	21	5	2	14	60	99	-39	17
21	Serbia	2	10	5	0	5	36	30	+6	15
22	Croatia	2	10	4	2	4	12	26	-14	14
23	Egypt	2	11	4	0	7	27	35	-8	12
24	Peru	2	12	4	0	8	28	49	-21	12
25	Portugal	1	6	3	0	3	10	13	-3	9
26	Zambia	3	16	3	0	13	33	91	-58	9
27	Libya	1	6	2	2	2	12	11	+1	8
28	Slovenia	1	6	1	3	2	13	16	-3	6
29	Uzbekistan	1	3	1	1	1	5	6	-1	4
30	Ecuador	1	6	1	1	4	14	21	-7	4
31	Chile	3	10	0	2	8	9	60	-51	2
32	Canada	2	9	0	1	8	8	56	-48	1
33	Japan	1	4	0	0	4	8	19	-11	0
34	Vietnam	1	3	0	0	3	4	17	-13	0
35	United States	1	6	0	0	6	10	35	-25	0
36	Qatar	1	6	0	0	6	8	41	-33	0

== Results by confederation ==
=== Men ===
==== AFC (Asia) ====
	2005	2006	2007	2008	2009	2010	2011	2013	2014	2015	2018	Total
Teams	0	0	2	0	1	2	1	2	2	1	0	11
1st	×	×	×	×	×	×	×	×	×	×	×	0
2nd	×	×	IRN	×	IRN	×	×	×	×	IRN	×	3
3rd	×	×	×	×	×	×	×	IRN	IRN	×	×	2
4th	×	×	×	×	×	IRN	IRN	×	×	×	×	2

==== CAF (Africa) ====
	2005	2006	2007	2008	2009	2010	2011	2013	2014	2015	2018	Total
Teams	0	0	3	3	2	2	3	0	0	2	0	15
1st	×	×	×	×	×	×	×	×	×	×	×	0
2nd	×	×	×	×	×	×	×	×	×	×	×	0
3rd	×	×	×	×	×	×	×	×	×	×	×	0
4th	×	×	×	×	×	×	×	×	×	×	×	0

==== CONCACAF (North, Central America and the Caribbean) ====
	2005	2006	2007	2008	2009	2010	2011	2013	2014	2015	2018	Total
Teams	0	0	1	1	2	2	3	1	2	1	1	14
1st	×	×	×	×	×	×	×	×	×	×	×	0
2nd	×	×	×	×	×	×	×	×	×	×	×	0
3rd	×	×	×	×	×	×	×	×	×	×	×	0
4th	×	×	×	×	×	×	×	×	GUA	×	CRC	2

==== CONMEBOL (South America) ====
	2005	2006	2007	2008	2009	2010	2011	2013	2014	2015	2018	Total
Teams	6	3	5	8	7	3	4	3	2	4	2	47
1st	BRA	BRA	BRA	BRA	BRA	×	BRA	BRA	BRA	BRA	BRA	10
2nd	COL	×	×	ARG	×	BRA	×	×	COL	×	×	4
3rd	ARG	×	ARG	×	×	PAR	ARG	×	×	COL	URU	6
4th	URU	ARG	×	PAR	×	×	×	PAR	×	PAR	×	5

==== OFC (Oceania) ====
	2005	2006	2007	2008	2009	2010	2011	2013	2014	2015	2018	Total
Teams	0	0	0	0	0	0	0	0	0	0	0	0
1st	×	×	×	×	×	×	×	×	×	×	×	0
2nd	×	×	×	×	×	×	×	×	×	×	×	0
3rd	×	×	×	×	×	×	×	×	×	×	×	0
4th	×	×	×	×	×	×	×	×	×	×	×	0

==== UEFA (Europe) ====
	2005	2006	2007	2008	2009	2010	2011	2013	2014	2015	2018	Total
Teams	0	3	4	4	4	7	5	2	0	0	2	31
1st	×	×	×	×	×	ESP	×	×	×	×	×	1
2nd	×	ITA	×	×	×	×	RUS	RUS	×	×	CZE	4
3rd	×	CRO	×	UKR	ROM	×	×	×	×	×	×	3
4th	×	×	HUN	×	CZE	×	×	×	×	×	×	2

== See also ==
- Futsal Mundialito
- Women's Futsal World Tournament
- Thailand International Futsal Cup
- Croatia International Futsal Cup
- Brazil International Futsal Cup
- China International Futsal Cup
- Iran International Futsal Cup
- Russia International Futsal Cup
- FIFA Futsal Tournament
- World University Futsal Championships
- Futsal Confederations Cup
