= 2020 Futsal Africa Cup of Nations =

2020 Africa Futsal Cup of Nations
Tournament details
- Host country: Morocco
- City: Laayoune
- Dates: 28 January – 7 February
- Teams: 8 (from 1 confederation)
- Venues: 2 (in 1 host city)

Final positions
- Champions: Morocco (2nd title)
- Runners-up: Egypt
- Third place: Angola
- Fourth place: Libya

Tournament statistics
- Matches played: 14
- Goals scored: 83 (5.93 per match)
- Top scorer: (Mozambique) Magu (6 goals)
- Best goalkeeper: (Morocco) Reda Khiyari
- Fair play award: Angola

The 2020 Africa Futsal Cup of Nations was the seventh edition of the Africa Futsal Cup of Nations, the quadrennial international futsal championship organised by the Confederation of African Football (CAF) for the men's national teams of Africa. The tournament was held in Morocco between 28 January – 7 February 2020 (original dates were 17–26 April 2020).

Same as previous editions, the tournament acted as the CAF qualifiers for the FIFA Futsal World Cup (except for 2012 when a separate qualifying tournament was organized as the 2011 African Futsal Championship was cancelled). The top three teams of the tournament qualified for the 2021 FIFA Futsal World Cup (originally 2020 but postponed due to COVID-19 pandemic) in Lithuania as the CAF representatives.

Morocco were the defending champions and successfully managed to defend their title after beating Egypt 5–0 in the final.

== Qualification ==
=== Qualified teams ===
The following eight teams qualified for the final tournament. South Africa withdrew from the tournament on 15 January 2020 as they refused to play in Laayoune of Western Sahara due to the Western Sahara conflict. They were replaced by Mauritius, which were eliminated by South Africa in the qualifying round. South Africa, together with Mauritius which withdrew after playing one match in the final tournament, were banned from the next two editions of the Africa Futsal Cup of Nations.

Team	Appearance	Previous best performance
Angola	3rd	Group stage (2008, 2016)
Egypt	6th	Champions (1996, 2000, 2004)
Equatorial Guinea	1st	Debut
Guinea	1st	Debut
Libya	4th	Champions (2008)
Mauritius	1st	Debut
Morocco (hosts)	5th	Champions (2016)
Mozambique	4th	Runners-up (2004)

== Venues ==
The matches were played at two venues in Laayoune.

- Hizam Hall
- El Massira Hall

== Squads ==
Each squad can contained a maximum of 14 players.

== Group stage ==
The draw for the final tournament took place on 7 December 2019, 19:00 WEST (UTC+1), at the Palais des Congrès in Laayoune. The eight teams were drawn into two groups of four. For the draw, the hosts Morocco were seeded in position A1, and Egypt, which had the highest ranking among the other teams, were seeded in position B1. The remaining six teams were drawn from one pot to fill the other positions in the two groups.

The top two teams of each group advance to the semi-finals.

Tiebreakers

The teams are ranked according to points (3 points for a win, 1 point for a draw, 0 points for a loss). If tied on points, tiebreakers are applied in the following order (Article 68):

1. Number of points obtained in games between the teams concerned;
2. Goal difference in games between the teams concerned;
3. Goals scored in games between the teams concerned;
4. If, after applying criteria 1 to 3 to several teams, two teams still have an equal ranking, criteria 1 to 3 are reapplied exclusively to the matches between the two teams in question to determine their final rankings. If this procedure does not lead to a decision, criteria 5 to 7 apply;
5. Goal difference in all games;
6. Goals scored in all games;
7. Drawing of lots.

All times are local, WEST (UTC+1).

=== Group A ===
Pos	Team	Pld	W	D	L	GF	GA	GD	Pts	Qualification
1	Morocco (H)	3	3	0	0	14	1	+13	9	Knockout stage
2	Libya	3	2	0	1	5	4	+1	6	Knockout stage
3	Equatorial Guinea	3	1	0	2	6	12	−6	3	
4	Mauritius	3	0	0	3	2	10	−8	0	Withdrew after one match (Note: On 30 January 2020, Mauritius announced that they had withdrawn from the tournament due to the Western Sahara conflict. Their remaining matches were awarded as 3–0 wins for their opponents (Regulations Article 81).)

Source: CAF
Rules for classification: Group stage tiebreakers
(H) Hosts
Notes:
28 January 2020
17:30

Equatorial Guinea	4–2	Mauritius
Tobe 24'; Owono 26', 32'; Wheeler 37'	Report	Jocelyn 28'; Pithia 40'

Hizam Hall, Laayoune
28 January 2020
21:00

Morocco	3–0	Libya
Knia 6'; El-Ayyane 12'; Jouad 31'	Report

Hizam Hall, Laayoune

30 January 2020
17:30

Mauritius	Cancelled Awarded 0–3	Libya

Hizam Hall, Laayoune
30 January 2020
21:00

Morocco	8–1	Equatorial Guinea
Jouad 8'; El-Mesrar 17'; Knia 19'; Saoud 20', 25'; Borite 31'; El-Fenni 34'; Maimón 38'	Report	Manami 10'

Hizam Hall, Laayoune

1 February 2020
21:00

Libya	2–1	Equatorial Guinea
Aboras 14'; Al-Toumi 39'	Report	Keny 17'

El Massira Hall, Laayoune
1 February 2020
21:00

Mauritius	Cancelled Awarded 0–3	Morocco

Hizam Hall, Laayoune

=== Group B ===
Pos	Team	Pld	W	D	L	GF	GA	GD	Pts	Qualification
1	Egypt	3	3	0	0	15	2	+13	9	Knockout stage
2	Angola	3	2	0	1	12	8	+4	6	Knockout stage
3	Guinea	3	1	0	2	8	17	−9	3	
4	Mozambique	3	0	0	3	9	17	−8	0	

Source: CAF
Rules for classification: Group stage tiebreakers
29 January 2020
17:30

Egypt	9–0	Guinea
Moza 4', 27'; El Ashwal 4'; Maradona 27'; Mizo 29'; Eid 33', 36'; Said 33'; Koki 34' (pen.)	Report

Hizam Hall, Laayoune
29 January 2020
21:00

Angola	7–4	Mozambique
Leu 7'; Magu 9' (o.g.); Jó 17'; Nonó 20', 35'; Manocele 23'; Levessene 37' (o.g.)	Report	Magu 9', 18', 31'; Mito 37' (pen.)

Hizam Hall, Laayoune

31 January 2020
17:30

Egypt	3–0	Angola
Said 5'; Moza 13'; El Ashwal 32'	Report

Hizam Hall, Laayoune
31 January 2020
21:00

Mozambique	3–7	Guinea
Magu 25', 32'; Dos Santos 36'	Report	B. Keita 18' (pen.), 31'; D. Camara 27', 35' (pen.), 37' (pen.); Fofana 32', 34'

Hizam Hall, Laayoune

2 February 2020
17:30

Mozambique	2–3	Egypt
Dos Santos (?); Magu (?)		Eika (?); Koki (?); Bogy 40'

Hizam Hall, Laayoune
2 February 2020
17:30

Guinea	1–5	Angola
Dramé 38'	Report	Jó 4', 16', 39'; Osnã 22'; Prado 30' (pen.)

El Massira Hall, Laayoune

== Knockout stage ==
In the knockout stage, extra time (two periods of 5 minutes each) and penalty shoot-out are used to decide the winner if necessary, except for the third place match where penalty shoot-out (no extra time) is used to decide the winner if necessary.

=== Bracket ===
Semi-finals
5 February – Hizam Hall
Morocco	4
Angola	0
5 February – Hizam Hall
Egypt	5
Libya	2

Final
7 February – Hizam Hall
Morocco	5
Egypt	0
Third place match
7 February – Hizam Hall
Angola	2
Libya	0

=== Semi-finals ===
Winners qualify for 2021 FIFA Futsal World Cup.

5 February 2020
17:30

Egypt	5–2	Libya
El Ashwal 2', 40'; Eid 23'; Mizo 32'; Moza 39'	Report	Suleiman 20'; Lamhammel 40'

Hizam Hall, Laayoune

5 February 2020
21:00

Morocco	4–0	Angola
Saoud 7', 17'; Jouad 8'; Maimón 33'	Report

Hizam Hall, Laayoune

=== Third place match ===
Winner qualifies for 2021 FIFA Futsal World Cup.

7 February 2020
17:30

Angola	2–0	Libya
Prado 17'; Manocele 40'	Report

Hizam Hall, Laayoune

=== Final ===
7 February 2020
21:00

Morocco	5–0	Egypt
El Mesrar 3', 17'; Fati 13'; El-Ayyane 23'; Knia 27'	Report

Hizam Hall, Laayoune

== Goalscorers ==
There were 83 goals scored in 14 matches, for an average of 5.93 goals per match.

6 goals

- (Mozambique) Magu

4 goals

- (Angola) Jó
- (Egypt) Abdel Rahman El Ashwal
- (Egypt) Ahmed Moza
- (Morocco) Achraf Saoud

3 goals

- (Egypt) Mostafa Eid
- (Guinea) Daouda Camara
- (Morocco) Soufiane El Mesrar
- (Morocco) Mohamed Jouad
- (Morocco) Saad Knia

2 goals

- (Angola) Manocele
- (Angola) Nonó
- (Angola) Prado
- (Egypt) Koki
- (Egypt) Mizo
- (Egypt) Mohamed Said
- (Equatorial Guinea) Vicente Owono
- (Guinea) Mbemba Fofana
- (Guinea) Batoura Keita
- (Morocco) Anás El-Ayyane
- (Morocco) Hamza Maimón
- (Mozambique) Oséias dos Santos

1 goal

- (Angola) Leu
- (Angola) Osnã
- (Egypt) Ibrahim Bogy
- (Egypt) Ibrahim Eika
- (Egypt) Khaled Maradona
- (Equatorial Guinea) Keny
- (Equatorial Guinea) Domingo Manami
- (Equatorial Guinea) Roberto Tobe
- (Equatorial Guinea) Junior Wheeler
- (Guinea) Sidina Dramé
- (Libya) Mohamed Aboras
- (Libya) Adham Al-Toumi
- (Libya) Ibrahim Lamhammel
- (Libya) Mohamed Suleiman
- (Mauritius) Mercyn Jocelyn
- (Mauritius) Fabrice Pithia
- (Morocco) Soufiane Borite
- (Morocco) Idriss El-Fenni
- (Morocco) Abdelatif Fati
- (Mozambique) Mito

1 own goal

- (Mozambique) Abilio Levessene (against Angola)
- (Mozambique) Magu (against Angola)

== Qualified teams for FIFA Futsal World Cup ==
The following three teams from CAF qualified for the 2021 FIFA Futsal World Cup.

Team	Qualified on	Previous appearances in FIFA Futsal World Cup^{1}
Egypt	5 February 2020	6 (1996, 2000, 2004, 2008, 2012, 2016)
Morocco	5 February 2020	2 (2012, 2016)
Angola	7 February 2020	0 (debut)

^{1} Bold indicates champions for that year. Italic indicates hosts for that year.
