= South Africa national futsal team =

South Africa
- Nickname(s): Bafana Bafana
- Association: South African; Football Association
- Confederation: CAF (Africa)
- FIFA code: RSA
- FIFA ranking: 58 ▼8 (12 December 2025)
Home colours	Away colours

First international
- South Africa 2–6 Libya (Cairo, Egypt; 16 April 2000)

Biggest win
- South Africa 4–2 Zimbabwe (Turffontein, South Africa; 5 May 2012)

Biggest defeat
- Brazil 30–0 South Africa (Kuala Lumpur, Malaysia; 3 June 2003)

FIFA World Cup
- Appearances: 0

Africa Futsal Cup of Nations
- Appearances: 4 (First in 2000)
- Best result: 4th place (2000)

The South Africa national futsal team is controlled by the South African Football Association, the governing body for futsal in South Africa and represents the country in international futsal competitions.

== Results ==
1. 2-6

== Tournaments ==
=== FIFA Futsal World Cup ===
- 1989 – Did not enter
- 1992 – Did not enter
- 1996 – Did not enter
- 2000 – Did not qualify
- 2004 – Did not qualify
- 2008 – Did not qualify
- 2012 – Did not qualify
- 2016 – Did not qualify
- 2021 – Withdrawn
- 2024 – Did not enter

=== Africa Futsal Cup of Nations ===
- 1996 – Did not enter
- 2000 – 4th place
- 2004 – First round
- 2008 – First round
- 2011 – Cancelled
- 2016 – First round (host)
- 2020 – Withdraw
- 2024 – Did not enter
