= 2016 Futsal Africa Cup of Nations =

2016 Africa Futsal Cup of Nations

Tournament details
- Host country: South Africa
- City: Johannesburg
- Dates: 15–24 April
- Teams: 8 (from 1 confederation)
- Venues: 2 (in 1 host city)

Final positions
- Champions: Morocco (1st title)
- Runners-up: Egypt
- Third place: Mozambique
- Fourth place: Zambia

Tournament statistics
- Matches played: 16
- Goals scored: 99 (6.19 per match)
- Top scorer: (Mozambique) Ricardo Lenio Mendes Muendane (10 goals)
- Fair play award: Mozambique

The 2016 Africa Futsal Cup of Nations was the sixth edition of the Africa Futsal Cup of Nations, the quadrennial international futsal championship organised by the Confederation of African Football (CAF) for the men's national teams of Africa. The tournament was held in South Africa between 15–24 April 2016. A total of eight teams played in the tournament.

Same as previous editions, the tournament acted as the CAF qualifiers for the FIFA Futsal World Cup (except for 2012 when a separate qualifying tournament was organized as the 2011 African Futsal Championship was cancelled). The top three teams of the tournament qualified for the 2016 FIFA Futsal World Cup in Colombia as the CAF representatives.

On 6 August 2015, the CAF Executive Committee decided to change the name of the tournament from the African Futsal Championship to the Africa Futsal Cup of Nations, similar to the football version, Africa Cup of Nations.

Champions Morocco, runners-up Egypt and third-placed Mozambique qualified for the 2016 FIFA Futsal World Cup as the CAF representatives.

== Qualification ==
South Africa qualified automatically as hosts, and Egypt also qualified automatically as the highest-placed African team in the 2012 FIFA Futsal World Cup, while the remaining six spots were determined by the qualifying rounds, which took take place in December 2015.

=== Qualified teams ===
The following eight teams qualified for the final tournament.

Team	Appearance	Previous best performance
Angola	2nd	Group stage (2008)
Egypt	5th	Champions (1996, 2000, 2004)
Libya	3rd	Champions (2008)
Morocco	4th	Runners-up (2000)
Mozambique	3rd	Runners-up (2004)
South Africa (hosts)	4th	Fourth place (2000)
Tunisia	2nd	Group stage (2008)
Zambia	2nd	Group stage (2008)

== Venues ==
The matches were played at the Ellis Park Arena and the Wembley Indoor Stadium in Johannesburg.

Johannesburg
Ellis Park Arena	Wembley Indoor Stadium
Capacity: 6,300	Capacity: 2,000
2016 Futsal Africa Cup of Nations is located in South Africa

== Squads ==
Each squad could contain a maximum of 14 players.

== Group stage ==
The draw for the final tournament of the competition took place on 17 February 2016, 11:00 UTC+2, at the Southern Sun Hotel OR Tambo International Airport in Johannesburg. The eight teams were drawn into two groups of four. For the draw, the hosts South Africa were seeded in position A1 and Egypt were seeded in position B1. The remaining six teams were drawn from one pot to fill the other positions in the two groups.

The top two teams of each group advanced to the semi-finals.

Tiebreakers

The teams were ranked according to points (3 points for a win, 1 point for a draw, 0 points for a loss). If tied on points, tiebreakers would be applied in the following order:

1. Number of points obtained in games between the teams concerned;
2. Goal difference in games between the teams concerned;
3. Goals scored in games between the teams concerned;
4. If, after applying criteria 1 to 3 to several teams, two teams still have an equal ranking, criteria 1 to 3 are reapplied exclusively to the matches between the two teams in question to determine their final rankings. If this procedure does not lead to a decision, criteria 5 to 7 apply;
5. Goal difference in all games;
6. Goals scored in all games;
7. Drawing of lots.

All times were local, SAST (UTC+2).

=== Group A ===
Pos	Team	Pld	W	D	L	GF	GA	GD	Pts	Qualification
1	Mozambique	3	2	1	0	15	9	+6	7	Knockout stage
2	Zambia	3	1	1	1	8	9	−1	4	Knockout stage
3	Tunisia	3	1	0	2	10	9	+1	3	
4	South Africa (H)	3	1	0	2	8	14	−6	3	

Source: CAF
Rules for classification: Group stage tiebreakers
(H) Hosts
15 April 2016
18:00

South Africa	4–7	Mozambique
Renaldo Donnelly 11', 35'; Nwashokwe Gift Mashaba 18'; Radlin Dwayne Sanssoucie 19'	Report	Ricardo Lenio Mendes Muendane 3', 15', 28'; José Da Silva Uetimane 8'; Amin Claudio Basilio Dale 9'; Flavio Boavida Chauque 38'; Ziraldo Joca Antonio Daniel 39'

Ellis Park Arena, Johannesburg
Referee: Ahmed Ali (Libya)
15 April 2016
21:00

Zambia	4–2	Tunisia
Adrian Chama 8', 12', 31'; Kelvin Kangwa 32'	Report	Zoubeir Amimi 9'; Bilel Ajmi 11'

Ellis Park Arena, Johannesburg
Referee: Mohamed Hassan Hassan Ahmed Youssef (Egypt)

17 April 2016
14:00

South Africa	3–0	Zambia
Renaldo Donnelly 26'; Wiseman Cele 28'; Nwashokwe Gift Mashaba 34'	Report

Ellis Park Arena, Johannesburg
Referee: Paul Akpome Umuago (Nigeria)
17 April 2016
17:00

Tunisia	1–4	Mozambique
Riadh Feker 17'	Report	Ricardo Lenio Mendes Muendane 18', 33'; Amin Claudio Basilio Dale 28', 39'

Ellis Park Arena, Johannesburg
Referee: José Francisco Katemo Katchingavisa (Angola)

19 April 2016
18:00

Tunisia	7–1	South Africa
Bilel Ajmi 21', 29', 37'; Zoubeir Amimi 36', 39', 39'; Moez Bacouche 37'	Report	Renaldo Donnelly 2' (pen.)

Ellis Park Arena, Johannesburg
Referee: Khalid Hnich (Morocco)
19 April 2016
18:00

Mozambique	4–4	Zambia
Mario Jona Junior 9'; Flavio Boavida Chauque 15', 24'; Ricardo Lenio Mendes Muendane 27'	Report	Adrian Chama 7', 36'; Chanda Brian Chungu 14'; Boniface Ndhlovu 37'

Wembley Indoor Stadium, Johannesburg
Referee: Mohamed Hassan Hassan Ahmed Youssef (Egypt)

=== Group B ===
Pos	Team	Pld	W	D	L	GF	GA	GD	Pts	Qualification
1	Egypt	3	2	1	0	7	4	+3	7	Knockout stage
2	Morocco	3	2	0	1	10	7	+3	6	Knockout stage
3	Libya	3	1	1	1	6	5	+1	4	
4	Angola	3	0	0	3	6	13	−7	0	

Source: CAF
Rules for classification: Group stage tiebreakers
16 April 2016
14:00

Egypt	0–0	Libya
	Report

Ellis Park Arena, Johannesburg
Referee: Moez Ben Salem (Tunisia)
16 April 2016
17:00

Angola	2–5	Morocco
Paulo Alberto Ribeiro 20'; Quissanga Alberto De Almeida 24'	Report	Saad Knia 4'; Artur Saddam Samuel Dasilva 26' (o.g.); Adil Habil 36'; Soufiane El Mesrar 37', 40'

Ellis Park Arena, Johannesburg
Referee: Adalbert Diouf (Senegal)

18 April 2016
18:00

Egypt	4–2	Angola
Mostafa Nader Rezk 3'; Mostafa Eid Mohamed 16', 21'; Ibrahim Magdy Ibrahim 39'	Report	Mario Jose Nogueira Antonio 39'; Osvaldo Saturnino Gama Inacio 39'

Ellis Park Arena, Johannesburg
Referee: Almoiz Ahmed Mohamed (Sudan)
18 April 2016
21:00

Morocco	3–2	Libya
Bilal Bakkali 18', 23'; Mohamed Jouad 28'	Report	Mohamed Ibrahim Shahout 32'; Rabia Abdelrahim 38'

Ellis Park Arena, Johannesburg
Referee: Theodore Yves Eyebe Messoa (Cameroon)

20 April 2016
18:00

Morocco	2–3	Egypt
Mostafa Eid Mohamed 14' (o.g.); Adil Habil 35'	Report	Ahmed Mohamed Abdelkader 12', 30'; Mostafa Eid Mohamed 33'

Ellis Park Arena, Johannesburg
Referee: Almoiz Ahmed Mohamed (Sudan)
20 April 2016
18:00

Libya	4–2	Angola
Salem Mustafa Aghila 2', 10', 22'; Mohamed Suleiman Ghaeb 7'	Report	Artur Saddam Samuel Dasilva 25'; Mario Jose Nogueira Antonio 36'

Wembley Indoor Stadium, Johannesburg
Referee: Moez Ben Salem (Tunisia)

== Knockout stage ==
In the knockout stage, if a match was level at the end of normal playing time, extra time would be played (two periods of 5 minutes each) and followed, if necessary, by kicks from the penalty mark to determine the winner, except for the third place match where no extra time would be played.

=== Bracket ===
Semi-finals
22 April – Johannesburg
Mozambique	1
Morocco	4
22 April – Johannesburg
Egypt	5
Zambia	4

Final
24 April – Johannesburg
Morocco	3
Egypt	2
Third place
24 April – Johannesburg
Mozambique (p)	5 (2)
Zambia	5 (1)

=== Semi-finals ===
Winners qualified for 2016 FIFA Futsal World Cup.

22 April 2016
18:00

Mozambique	1–4	Morocco
Ricardo Lenio Mendes Muendane 39'	Report	El Mesrar 13', 22'; Adil Habil 26' (pen.), 38'

Ellis Park Arena, Johannesburg
Referee: Moez Ben Salem (Tunisia)

22 April 2016
21:00

Egypt	5–4	Zambia
Mostafa Eid Mohamed 11', 11', 13'; Ahmed Mohamed Abdelkader 17'; Mohamed Mokhtar Mohamed 29'	Report	Boniface Ndhlovu 19'; Michelo Kaampwe 27', 35'; Donald Phiri 30' (pen.)

Ellis Park Arena, Johannesburg
Referee: Adalbert Diouf (Senegal)

=== Third place play-off ===
Winner qualified for 2016 FIFA Futsal World Cup.

24 April 2016
14:00

Mozambique	5–5	Zambia
Flavio Boavida Chauque 3'; Ricardo Lenio Mendes Muendane 5', 8', 34'; Amin Claudio Basilio Dale 35'	Report	Enock Shanchebo 4'; Ricardo Jorge Da Conceicao Ferreira 7' (o.g.); Michelo Kaampwe 25'; Nobet Mwinga 32'; Kenneth Chulu 40'
Penalties
Ricardo Lenio Mendes Muendane (penalty missed); Ziraldo Joca Antonio Daniel (penalty missed); Manuel Francisco (penalty scored); Amin Claudio Basilio Dale (penalty scored)	2–1	(penalty missed) Michelo Kaampwe; (penalty missed) Kenneth Chulu; (penalty scored) Adrian Chama; (penalty missed) Robby Phiri

Ellis Park Arena, Johannesburg
Referee: Ahmed Ali (Libya)

=== Final ===
24 April 2016
17:00

Morocco	3–2	Egypt
Mohamed Jouad 13'; Bilal Bakkali 19'; Adil Habil 38'	Report	Mostafa Eid Mohamed 12', 18'

Ellis Park Arena, Johannesburg
Referee: José Francisco Katemo Katchingavisa (Angola)

== Winners ==
2016 Africa Futsal Cup of Nations

Morocco
1st title

== Tournament ranking ==
The three best ranked teams qualified for the 2016 FIFA Futsal World Cup.

Pos	Team	Pld	W	D	L	GF	GA	GD	Pts	Final result
1	Morocco	5	4	0	1	17	10	+7	12	Champions
2	Egypt	5	3	1	1	14	11	+3	10	Runners-up
3	Mozambique	5	2	2	1	21	18	+3	8	Third place
4	Zambia	5	1	2	2	17	19	−2	5	Fourth place
5	Libya	3	1	1	1	6	5	+1	4	Eliminated in group stage
6	Tunisia	3	1	0	2	10	9	+1	3	Eliminated in group stage
7	South Africa (H)	3	1	0	2	8	14	−6	3	Eliminated in group stage
8	Angola	3	0	0	3	6	13	−7	0	Eliminated in group stage

(H) Hosts

=== Qualified teams for FIFA Futsal World Cup ===
The following three teams from CAF qualified for the FIFA Futsal World Cup.

Team	Qualified on	Previous appearances in tournament^{1}
Morocco	22 April 2016	1 (2012)
Egypt	22 April 2016	5 (1996, 2000, 2004, 2008, 2012)
Mozambique	24 April 2016	0 (debut)

^{1} Bold indicates champion for that year. Italic indicates host for that year.
