= Salle Ibn Yassine =

Indoor arena in Rabat, Morocco

Coordinates: 34.005157°N 6.846398°W

Salle Ibn Yassine is an indoor sporting arena located in Rabat, Morocco. The capacity of the arena is 5,000 people.

The arena co-hosted the 2024 Futsal Africa Cup of Nations in Rabat, alongside the larger Salle Moulay Abdellah.
