= Angola national futsal team =

Angola
- Nickname(s): Palancas Negras (Sable Antelopes)
- Association: Angolan Football Federation
- Confederation: CAF (Africa)
- FIFA code: ANG
- FIFA ranking: 53 ▲1 (24 September 2026)
Home colours	Third colours

First international
- Libya 2–5 Angola (Maputo, Mozambique; 27 April 2006)

Biggest win
- Timor-Leste 3–24 Angola (Macau, China; 14 October 2006)

Biggest defeat
- Brazil 12–0 Angola (Fortaleza, Brazil; 31 May 2008)

FIFA World Cup
- Appearances: 2 (First in 2021)
- Best result: Group Stage (2021, 2024)

AMF World Cup
- Appearances: 1 (First in 1997)
- Best result: 1st round (1997)

Africa Futsal Cup of Nations
- Appearances: 4 (First in 2008)
- Best result: Runners-up (2024), (2026)

Grand Prix de Futsal
- Appearances: 5 (First in 2007)
- Best result: 7th place (2015)

The Angola national futsal team is controlled by the Angolan Football Federation, the governing body for futsal in Angola, and represents the country in international futsal competitions.

== History ==
In the 2024 Futsal Africa Cup of Nations, Angola defeated Egypt 7–3 in the semi-finals to qualify for the final for the first time in their history. On 21 April 2024, Angola lost to hosts Morocco 5–1 in the Final.

In the 2026 Futsal Africa Cup of Nations, Angola qualified for the semi-finals after finishing top in the group stage, winning all three matches. In the semi-final, they beat Algeria 3–2, thus reaching the final for the second consecutive time. On 21 October 2026, Angola lost 5–2 to Morocco in the 2026 Futsal Africa Cup of Nations.

== Results and fixtures ==
Legend

Win Draw Lose Fixture

== Competitive record ==
=== FIFA Futsal World Cup ===
FIFA Futsal World Cup record
Year	Round	Pld	W	D	L	GS	GA
(Netherlands) 1989	Did not enter						
(Hong Kong) 1992	Did not enter						
(Spain) 1996	Did not enter						
(Guatemala) 2000	Did not enter						
(Chinese Taipei) 2004	Did not enter						
(Brazil) 2008	Did not qualify						
(Thailand) 2012	Did not enter						
(Colombia) 2016	Did not qualify						
(Lithuania) 2021	Group stage	3	0	0	3	6	16
(Uzbekistan) 2024	Group stage	3	0	0	3	11	22
Total	2/10	6	0	0	6	17	38

=== Africa Futsal Cup of Nations ===
Africa Futsal Cup of Nations record

- 1996–2004 – Did not enter
- 2008 – 1st round
- 2011 – Cancelled
- 2016 – 1st round
- 2020 – (bronze) 3rd place
- 2024 – (silver) Runners-up
- 2026 – (silver) Runners-up

=== Grand Prix de Futsal ===
- 2005 – Did not enter
- 2006 – Did not enter
- 2007 – 13th place
- 2008 – 13th place
- 2009 – 16th place
- 2010 – Did not enter
- 2011 – 11th place
- 2013 – Did not enter
- 2014 – Did not enter
- 2015 – 7th place
- 2018 – Did not enter

=== Futsal Mundialito ===
- 1994 – Did not enter
- 1995 – Did not enter
- 1996 – Did not enter
- 1998 – Did not enter
- 2001 – Did not enter
- 2002 – Did not enter
- 2006 – (bronze) 3rd place
- 2007 – 6th place
- 2008 – (bronze) 3rd place
