= 2015 Grand Prix de Futsal =

Tournament details
- Host country: Brazil
- Dates: 4 – 8 November
- Teams: 8 (from 4 confederations)
- Venue(s): 1 (in 1 host city)

Final positions
- Champions: Brazil (9th title)
- Runners-up: Iran
- Third place: Colombia
- Fourth place: Paraguay

Tournament statistics
- Matches played: 18
- Goals scored: 111 (6.17 per match)

The 2015 Grand Prix de Futsal was the tenth edition of the international futsal competition of the same kind as the FIFA Futsal World Cup but with invited nations and held annually in Brazil. It was first held in 2005.

== Participating ==
CONMEBOL (4)

- Brazil
- Colombia
- Uruguay
- Paraguay

AFC (1)

- Iran

CONCACAF (1)

- Guatemala

CAF (2)

- Angola
- Zambia

== First round ==
=== Group A ===
Team	Pld	W	D	L	GF	GA	GD	Pts
Brazil	3	3	0	0	23	3	+20	9
Paraguay	3	1	0	2	10	11	–1	3
Guatemala	3	1	0	2	9	17	–8	3
Zambia	3	1	0	2	9	20	–11	3

4 November
14:00

Paraguay	3 – 6	Guatemala

Centro Olímpico Engenheiro Wagner do Nascimento, Uberaba
4 November
19:15

Brazil	11 – 2	Zambia

Centro Olímpico Engenheiro Wagner do Nascimento, Uberaba
5 November
13:45

Zambia	2 – 6	Paraguay

Centro Olímpico Engenheiro Wagner do Nascimento, Uberaba
5 November
19:15

Brazil	9 – 0	Guatemala

Centro Olímpico Engenheiro Wagner do Nascimento, Uberaba
6 November
16:00

Guatemala	3 – 5	Zambia

Centro Olímpico Engenheiro Wagner do Nascimento, Uberaba
7 November
21:00

Brazil	3 – 1	Paraguay

Centro Olímpico Engenheiro Wagner do Nascimento, Uberaba

=== Group B ===
Team	Pld	W	D	L	GF	GA	GD	Pts
Iran	3	3	0	0	18	4	+14	9
Colombia	3	2	0	1	8	6	+2	6
Uruguay	3	1	0	2	9	15	–6	3
Angola	3	0	0	3	2	12	–10	0

4 November
16:00

Uruguay	4 – 2	Angola

Centro Olímpico Engenheiro Wagner do Nascimento, Uberaba
4 November
21:30

Colombia	1 – 4	Iran

Centro Olímpico Engenheiro Wagner do Nascimento, Uberaba
5 November
16:00

Uruguay	2 – 6	Colombia

Centro Olímpico Engenheiro Wagner do Nascimento, Uberaba
5 November
21:15

Iran	7 – 0	Angola

Centro Olímpico Engenheiro Wagner do Nascimento, Uberaba
6 November
14:00

Iran	7 – 3	Uruguay

Centro Olímpico Engenheiro Wagner do Nascimento, Uberaba
6 November
18:30

Angola	0 – 1	Colombia

Centro Olímpico Engenheiro Wagner do Nascimento, Uberaba

== Final round ==
=== Classification 7th–8th ===
7th place
7 November
Zambia	1
Angola	5

=== Classification 5th–6th ===
5th place
7 November
Guatemala	0
Uruguay	2

=== Classification 1st–4th ===
Semifinals
7 November
Brazil	5
Colombia	0
7 November
Iran	2
Paraguay	0

Final
8 November
Brazil	4
Iran	3
3rd place
8 November
Colombia	1
Paraguay	0

==== 7th place match ====
7 November
20:00

Zambia	1 – 5	Angola

Centro Olímpico Engenheiro Wagner do Nascimento, Uberaba

==== 5th place match ====
7 November
18:00

Guatemala	0 – 2	Uruguay

Centro Olímpico Engenheiro Wagner do Nascimento, Uberaba

==== Semifinal ====
7 November
13:00

Iran	2 – 0	Paraguay

Centro Olímpico Engenheiro Wagner do Nascimento, Uberaba
7 November
16:00

Brazil	5 – 0	Colombia

Centro Olímpico Engenheiro Wagner do Nascimento, Uberaba

==== 3rd place match ====
8 November
08:00

Colombia	1 – 0	Paraguay

Centro Olímpico Engenheiro Wagner do Nascimento, Uberaba

==== Final ====
8 November
11:00

Brazil	4 – 3	Iran

Centro Olímpico Engenheiro Wagner do Nascimento, Uberaba

== Final standing ==
Rank	Team
1st place, gold medalist(s)	Brazil
2nd place, silver medalist(s)	Iran
3rd place, bronze medalist(s)	Colombia
4	Paraguay
5	Uruguay
6	Guatemala
7	Angola
8	Zambia

2015 Grand Prix de Futsal winner

Brazil
