= Soufiane El Mesrar =

Moroccan futsal player

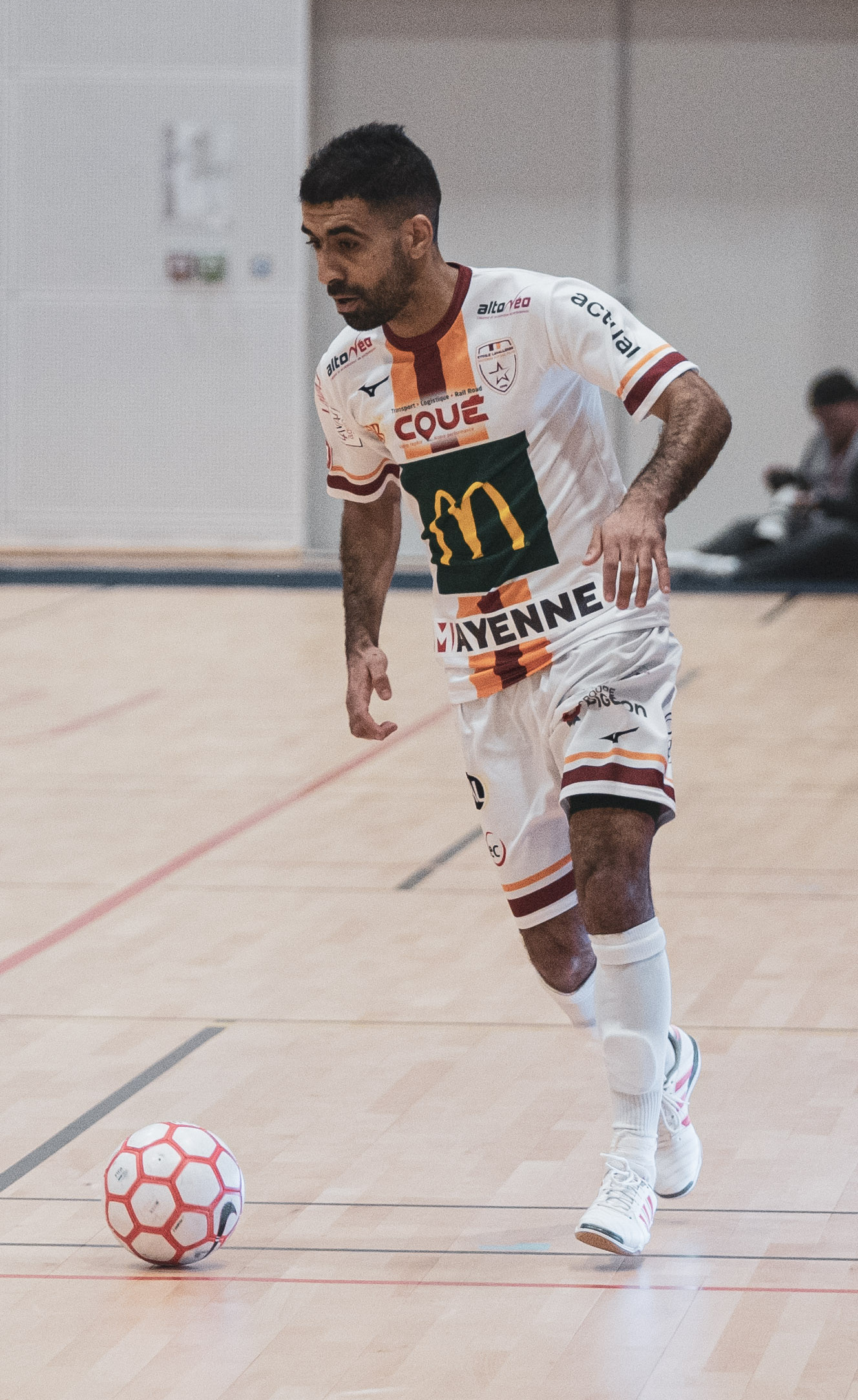

Personal information
- Date of birth: 5 June 1990 (age 36)
- Place of birth: Kenitra, Morocco
- Position: Midfielder

Team information
- Current team: Étoile lavalloise Futsal Club
- Number: 18

Senior career*
Years	Team	Apps	(Gls)
2010–2018	Dynamo Kénitra		
2018–2019	Montpellier MF	28	(19)
2019–2021	ACCS AV 92	49	(36)
2022–	Étoile lavalloise		

International career
2011–	Morocco		
- * Club domestic league appearances and goals

Soufiane El Mesrar (born 5 June 1990) is a Moroccan professional futsal player who plays for Étoile lavalloise Futsal Club and the Morocco national futsal team.

== Biography ==
=== Training at Dynamo Kenitra (2010–2018) ===
A former traditional football player at Kénitra AC, Soufiane El Mesrar began playing futsal at AC Dynamo Kénitra in 2010. With this club, he won the Moroccan championship twice, during the 2015–2016 and 2017–2018 seasons. In the meantime, he finished as the top scorer of the 2016–2017 season with 38 goals, ahead of Mohamed Jouad by two goals. With Dynamo Kenitra, he also won the Coupe du Trône in the 2017–2018 season.

=== First Experience in France with MMF (2018–2019) ===
El Mesrar arrived in France in August 2018 and signed with Montpellier Méditerranée Futsal alongside his compatriot Bilal Bakkali. Soufiane El Mesrar played his first match with the Montpellier club on 15 September 2018 against Futsal Dijon Clénay during the 1st day of the 2018–2019 French Second Division Futsal Championship, a match that ended with a victory for Montpellier, with a hat-trick from the Moroccan winger, his first goals in France. In the next match, in Corsica, El Mesrar contributed to his team's victory on the court of Entente Furiani (6–0) by scoring four goals. On 6 October 2018, MMF won at home (10–2) against AS Minguettes Vénissieux with a goal from the Moroccan. The Montpelliers traveled the following weekend to Plaisance All-Stars and won on their field (5–4) with a brace from the Kenitra-born player. Soufiane El Mesrar scored his 11th goal of the season on 20 October 2018 against Kingersheim during the 5th day of D2. On 10 November 2018, MMF drew with Strasbourg Neuhof (3–3) with a goal from El Mesrar. He scored a brace the following match against Elsass Pfastatt Futsal, in a match where Montpellier suffered their first loss of the season (5–3). MMF lost to Toulouse Métropole on 8 December 2018 by 4–2, with El Mesrar scoring one of his team's two goals. In the next match, he contributed to Montpellier's victory (4–2) against Entente Furiani with a brace.

Soufiane El Mesrar scored his 18th goal of the season on 26 January 2019 on the field of AS Minguettes Vénissieux, where MMF won (6–2).

On 9 February 2019, Montpellier Méditerranée started in the 2018–2019 National Cup by traveling to Pays Voironnais Futsal. MMF won the match with a brace from the Moroccan.

=== Discovery of D1 and the Champions League with ACCS 92 (2019–2021) ===
After a season at MMF, he joined, along with Bilal Bakkali, ACCS FC, a club competing in the elite of French futsal.

Soufiane El Mesrar played his first match for his new team on 14 September 2019 against Toulouse Métropole during the first round of the D1. ACCS won the match (8–1) but later lost on a technicality due to an irregularity.

He scored his first goal with ACCS in the next round against Nantes Métropole Futsal, helping the Parisian club win 7–1.

In the following round, ACCS secured a 9–3 home victory against Sporting Club de Paris, with a goal and an assist from the Moroccan.

On 3 November 2019, ACCS dealt a heavy blow to Roubaix AFS with an 18–1 victory, during which El Mesrar scored a hat-trick.

Soufiane El Mesrar scored his sixth goal of the season against Paris ACASA futsal on 9 November 2019.

He found the back of the net again on 15 December 2019 against Orchies Pévèle, in a 9–4 victory for ACCS.

The Moroccan winger scored a goal and provided two assists in a 9–1 win against Sporting Paris on 8 March 2020 during the 13th round of D1.

While the club was at the top of the standings, the 2019–2020 season was cut short due to the COVID-19 pandemic, and no title was awarded. El Mesrar had scored eight goals in 14 matches by the time the championships were halted. He continued his journey with ACCS and began the 2020–2021 season with a 6–0 victory for his team on 12 September 2020 on Nantes Métropole's court.

On October 10, 2020, during the fourth round, ACCS delivered a crushing defeat (14–2) to newly promoted Chavanoz, with a goal from El Mesrar. The following weekend, Soufiane El Mesrar scored a brace against Béthune Futsal.

== Honours ==
ACCS Asnières Villeneuve 92

- Championnat de France de Futsal: 2020–21

Étoile lavalloise

- Championnat de France de Futsal: 2022–23, 2023–24
- Coupe de France de futsal: 2022–23, 2023–24

Morocco National team

- Futsal Africa Cup of Nations: 2016, 2020 and 2024

=== Individual awards ===
- Top scorer of the Moroccan Futsal Championship: 2016–2017 (38 goals)
- Best player of the Arab Futsal Cup: 2022
- Top scorer of the Changshu International Tournament: 2019 (5 goals)
- 2-time Top scorer of the French D1 Championship: 2022–23 (30 goals) and French D1 Championship 2023–24 (25 goals)
- Best player of the French D1 Championship: 2022–2023
