= 2004 African Futsal Championship =

Tournament details
- Dates: 9 July – 3 September
- Teams: 8 (from 8 associations)

Final positions
- Champions: Egypt (3rd title)
- Runners-up: Mozambique

Tournament statistics
- Matches played: 6
- Goals scored: 56 (9.33 per match)

The 2004 African Futsal Championship took place between 9 July – 3 September 2004. The tournament was won by Egypt who qualified for the 2004 FIFA Futsal World Championship in Chinese Taipei.

== First round ==
(July 9/July 13)

Team 1	Agg.	Team 2	1st leg	2nd leg
Egypt	19–3	South Africa	11–1	8–2
Sudan	walkover	Morocco	0–3	0–3
Cape Verde	walkover	Guinea-Bissau	0–3	0–3
Cameroon	walkover	Mozambique	0–3	0–3

== Semi-finals ==
(Jul 31/Aug 15)

Team 1	Agg.	Team 2	1st leg	2nd leg
Egypt	11–3	Morocco	7–0	4–3
Guinea-Bissau	walkover	Mozambique	0–3	0–3

== Final ==
(Aug 27/Sep 03)

Team 1	Agg.	Team 2	1st leg	2nd leg
Egypt	13–7	Mozambique	10–2	3–5

2004 African Futsal Championship

Egypt
3rd title

== Ranking ==
Rank	Team	M	W	D	L	GF	GA	GD	Points
1	Egypt	6	5	0	1	43	13	+30	15
2	Mozambique	2	1	0	1	7	13	-6	3
3	Morocco	2	0	0	2	3	11	-8	0
4	Guinea-Bissau	0	0	0	0	0	0	0	0
5	South Africa	2	0	0	2	3	19	-16	0
6	Cameroon	0	0	0	0	0	0	0	0
7	Cape Verde	0	0	0	0	0	0	0	0
8	Sudan	0	0	0	0	0	0	0	0
