= 2000 African Futsal Championship =

Tournament details
- Dates: 16–21 April
- Teams: 4 (from 4 associations)

Final positions
- Champions: Egypt (2nd title)
- Runners-up: Morocco
- Third place: Libya
- Fourth place: South Africa

Tournament statistics
- Matches played: 6
- Goals scored: 74 (12.33 per match)
- All statistics correct as of 13 February 2016.

The 2000 African Futsal Championship took place in Cairo, Egypt from 16 to 21 April 2000. The tournament served as a qualifying tournament for the 2000 FIFA Futsal World Cup in Guatemala.

== Matches ==
Home	Score	Away
Egypt	3–2	Morocco
South Africa	2–6	Libya
Egypt	9–1	Libya
Morocco	14–1	South Africa
Morocco	8–8	Libya
Egypt	18–2	South Africa

== Standings ==
Team	Pld	W	D	L	GF	GA	GD	Pts	Qualification
Egypt	3	3	0	0	30	5	+25	9	African Futsal Champions and qualified for the 2000 FIFA Futsal World Cup
Morocco	3	1	1	1	24	12	+12	4	
Libya	3	1	1	1	15	19	−4	4	
South Africa	3	0	0	3	5	38	−33	0	

Source: rsssf.com

== Honors ==
2000 African Futsal Championship

Egypt
2nd title
