= List of Libya national futsal team matches =

These are the matches played by Libya national futsal team, matches are added as soon as the team plays them.

== Matches ==
=== 1974 ===
Date	Opposition	Result	Score (HT Score)	Competition
July 19	Italy	L	2-9	International Friendly

Pld	W	W%	D	D%	L	L%	GF	GA	GR
1	0	0%	0	0%	1	100%	2	9	0.22

=== 1998 ===
Date	Opposition	Result	Score (HT Score)	Competition
December 6	Morocco	L	3-6	1998 Arab Futsal Championship
December 7	Jordan	W	5-4	1998 Arab Futsal Championship
December 8	Algeria	W	11-4	1998 Arab Futsal Championship
December 10	Egypt	L	3-7	1998 Arab Futsal Championship
December 12	Palestine	W	6-2	1998 Arab Futsal Championship

Pld	W	W%	D	D%	L	L%	GF	GA	GR
5	3	60%	0	0%	2	40%	28	23	1.22

=== 2000 ===
Date	Opposition	Result	Score (HT Score)	Competition
April 16	South Africa	W	6-2	2000 African Futsal Championship
April 18	Egypt	L	1-9 (Note: Libya's Worst defeat.)	2000 African Futsal Championship
April 21	Morocco	D	8-8	2000 African Futsal Championship

Pld	W	W%	D	D%	L	L%	GF	GA	GR
3	1	33.3%	1	33.3%	1	33.3%	15	19	0.79

=== 2005 ===
Date	Opposition	Result	Score (HT Score)	Competition
July 19	Morocco	L	4-7	2005 Arab Futsal Championship
July 20	Iraq	W	9-4	2005 Arab Futsal Championship
July 21	Algeria	W	4-2	2005 Arab Futsal Championship
July 23	Egypt	L	6-7	2005 Arab Futsal Championship
July 24	Lebanon	L	5-8	2005 Arab Futsal Championship
September 19	Tunisia	W	12-6 (5-5)	2005 North African Futsal Cup
September 21	Morocco	W	2-1 (0-0)	2005 North African Futsal Cup
September 25	Tunisia	W	6-3 (3-2)	2005 North African Futsal Cup
September 26	Morocco	W	4-3 (0-1)	2005 North African Futsal Cup

Pld	W	W%	D	D%	L	L%	GF	GA	GR
9	6	66.7%	0	0%	3	33.3%	52	41	1.24

=== 2006 ===
Date	Opposition	Result	Score (HT Score)	Competition
April 10	Croatia	L	3-2	International Friendly
April 11	Croatia	L	5-4	International Friendly
April 27	Angola	L	2-5	Four Nations Futsal Tournament (Maputo, Mozambique)
April 28	Mozambique	W	5-3	Four Nations Futsal Tournament (Maputo, Mozambique)
April 29	South Africa	W	7-0	Four Nations Futsal Tournament (Maputo, Mozambique)
May 25	Tunisia	W	3-2	International Friendly
May 27	Tunisia	W	5-0	International Friendly
October 12	Tunisia	W	6-3	International Friendly
October 13	Tunisia	D	9-7 (Note: Penalty shootout.) 2-2	International Friendly
October 14	Tunisia	W	6-2	International Friendly
October 26	Algeria	W	5-0	International Friendly
October 27	Algeria	W	5-3	International Friendly
November 7	Morocco	D	1-1	International Friendly
November 8	Morocco	W	4-3	International Friendly
November 21	Egypt	D	3-3	International Friendly
November 22	Egypt	D	1-1	International Friendly
December 24	Morocco	W	4-2	International Friendly
December 25	Morocco	L	2-3	International Friendly

Pld	W	W%	D	D%	L	L%	GF	GA	GR
18	10	55.6%	4	22.2%	4	22.2%	67	41	1.6

=== 2007 ===
Date	Opposition	Result	Score (HT Score)	Competition
January 10	Morocco	W	6-3 (4-1)	2007 Arab Futsal Championship
January 12	Tunisia	W	3-1 (1-0)	2007 Arab Futsal Championship
January 14	Lebanon	W	4-2 (0-2)	2007 Arab Futsal Championship
January 18	Algeria	D	2-2 (1-1)	2007 Arab Futsal Championship
January 20	Egypt	W	2-0 (Note: Penalty for leaving match during play.) (0-0)	2007 Arab Futsal Championship
June 7	Mozambique	D	4-4	International Friendly
June 9	Mozambique	W	7-2	International Friendly
June 10	Mozambique	D	3-3	International Friendly
November 15	Macedonia	D	6-6	International Friendly
November 16	Macedonia	D	1-1	International Friendly
November 17	Macedonia	W	5-4	International Friendly
November 18	Macedonia	D	1-1	International Friendly

Pld	W	W%	D	D%	L	L%	GF	GA	GR
12	6	50%	6	50%	0	0%	44	29	1.52

=== 2008 ===
Date	Opposition	Result	Score (HT Score)	Competition
January 21	Brazil	L	2-3	International Friendly
January 23	Brazil	L	3-5	International Friendly
January 25	Brazil	L	1-2	International Friendly
March 4	Argentina	L	3-4	International Friendly
March 6	Argentina	L	3-4	International Friendly
March 21	Nigeria	W	4-0 (2-0)	2008 African Futsal Championship
March 22	Tunisia	W	4-2 (3-2)	2008 African Futsal Championship
March 23	Morocco	W	4-1	2008 African Futsal Championship
March 24	Cameroon	W	7-1 (3-1)	2008 African Futsal Championship
March 28	Mozambique	W	4-1 (2-1)	2008 African Futsal Championship
March 31	Egypt	W	4-3 AET (2-1, 3-3)	2008 African Futsal Championship
July 2	Georgia	W	4-1 (0-0)	2008 Futsal Mundialito
July 3	Portugal	L	0-4 (0-1)	2008 Futsal Mundialito
July 5	Hungary	L	3-4 AET (1-0, 2-2)	2008 Futsal Mundialito
July 6	Angola	L	2-5 (1-2)	2008 Futsal Mundialito
August 9	Argentina	L	1-3	International Friendly
August 10	Argentina	L	2-3	International Friendly
August 11	Argentina	D	5-5	International Friendly
August 12	Argentina	L	0-3	International Friendly
August 22	Serbia	W	7-1 (2-0)	El-Fatih International Futsal Championship
August 23	Romania	D	5-5 (2-1)	El-Fatih International Futsal Championship
August 25	Romania	W	6-3 (3-1)	El-Fatih International Futsal Championship
August 27	Serbia	D	2-2 (0-0)	El-Fatih International Futsal Championship
August 28	Syria	W	17-2 (7-1)	International Friendly
August 29	Syria	W	20-3 (Note: Libya's biggest win.)	International Friendly
September 13	Italy	L	0-4	International Friendly
October 1	Uruguay	D	3-3 (0-1)	2008 FIFA Futsal World Cup
October 3	Spain	L	0-3 (0-2)	2008 FIFA Futsal World Cup
October 5	Iran	L	2-4 (1-3)	2008 FIFA Futsal World Cup
October 7	Czech Republic	L	2-4 (1-2)	2008 FIFA Futsal World Cup
December 19	Lithuania	L	1-2 (0-1)	Four Nations Futsal Cup (Loughborough, England)
December 20	Ireland	W	4-0 (1-0)	Four Nations Futsal Cup (Loughborough, England)
December 21	England	W	3-2 (1-0)	Four Nations Futsal Cup (Loughborough, England)
December 24	Iraq	W	6-3 (4-1)	2008 Arab Futsal Championship
December 25	Lebanon	W	6-2 (2-2)	2008 Arab Futsal Championship
December 26	Yemen	W	12-0 (8-0)	2008 Arab Futsal Championship
December 27	Algeria	W	14-4 (8-1)	2008 Arab Futsal Championship
December 28	Jordan	W	2-0 (1-0)	2008 Arab Futsal Championship
December 29	Egypt	W	3-2 (1-1)	2008 Arab Futsal Championship

Pld	W	W%	D	D%	L	L%	GF	GA	GR
39	19	48.7%	4	10.3%	16	41%	171	103	1.66

=== 2009 ===
Date	Opposition	Result	Score (HT Score)	Competition
March 2	Hungary	D	2-2 (1-2)	2009 Sultat Shaab Cup
March 5	Albania	W	10-3 (3-3)	2009 Sultat Shaab Cup
March 8	Albania	W	4-0 (4-0)	International Friendly
May 11	Qatar	W	8-0	International Friendly
May 12	Qatar	W	7-1	International Friendly
May 27	Iran	D	3-3 (1-2)	International Friendly
May 28	Iran	L	1-4 (1-2)	International Friendly
May 29	Iran	L	2-4 (1-2)	International Friendly
July 20	Ukraine 'B'/U-21	W	11-1	International Friendly
July 21	Ukraine 'B'/U-21	D	0-0	International Friendly
July 22	Ukraine 'B'/U-21	W	7-0	International Friendly
July 31	Japan	W	6-3 (2-1)	International Friendly
August 1	Japan	D	2-2 (1-1)	International Friendly
August 12	Egypt	W	4-2 (2-1)	2009 North African Futsal Cup
August 14	Syria	W	11-1 (3-0)	2009 North African Futsal Cup
August 16	Tunisia	W	5-0 (3-0)	2009 North African Futsal Cup
September 16	Belarus	L	1-2 (0-0)	International Friendly
September 17	Belarus	D	1-1 (1-0)	International Friendly
October 6	Solomon Islands	W	6-5 (1-3)	2009 Al-Fateh Confederations Futsal Cup
October 8	Guatemala	W	3-2 (1-1)	2009 Al-Fateh Confederations Futsal Cup
October 10	Uruguay	L	2-3 (2-1)	2009 Al-Fateh Confederations Futsal Cup
October 11	Iran	L	0-1 (0-0)	2009 Al-Fateh Confederations Futsal Cup
December 4	England	D	1-1	International Friendly
December 5	England	L	1-2	International Friendly

Pld	W	W%	D	D%	L	L%	GF	GA	GR
24	12	50%	6	25%	6	25%	98	43	2.28

=== 2010 ===
Date	Opposition	Result	Score (HT Score)	Competition
February 22	Cameroon	W	6-2	International Friendly
February 23	Cameroon	W	3-0	International Friendly
February 24	Cameroon	W	10-3	International Friendly
March 2	Jordan	W	6-1 ( 3-1 )	2010 Sultat Shaab Cup
March 4	Cameroon	W	8-1 ( 4-0 )	2010 Sultat Shaab Cup
March 6	Ukraine	W	7-4 ( 1-2 )	2010 Sultat Shaab Cup
June 1	Czech Republic	L	4-5 ( 3-2 )	Omar Almokhtar Futsal International Cup
June 4	Greece	W	6-1 ( 3-1 )	Omar Almokhtar Futsal International Cup
June 6	Belarus	W	6-1 ( 2-0 )	Omar Almokhtar Futsal International Cup
July 16	World Stars	D	5-5 ( 1-3 )	International Friendly
July 17	World Stars	L	3-6 ( 1-5 )	International Friendly
September 20	Palestine	W	12-0 ( 8-0 )	2010 North African Futsal Cup
September 21	Tunisia	W	6-1 ( 2-0 )	2010 North African Futsal Cup
September 24	Algeria	W	12-2 (5-1)	2010 North African Futsal Cup
September 26	Morocco	W	4-3 (2-1)	2010 North African Futsal Cup
October 17	Costa Rica	D	3-3 (1-2)	2010 Grand Prix de Futsal
October 18	Czech Republic	D	2-2 (0-1)	2010 Grand Prix de Futsal
October 19	Brazil	L	1-2 (0-1)	2010 Grand Prix de Futsal
October 21	Zambia	W	1-0 (0-0)	2010 Grand Prix de Futsal
October 22	Costa Rica	W	5-2 (2-0)	2010 Grand Prix de Futsal
October 22	Russia	L	0-2 (0-1)	2010 Grand Prix de Futsal
November 1	Syria	W	16-2 (8-0)	2010 Mediterranean Futsal Cup
November 3	Morocco	W	7-4 (3-2)	2010 Mediterranean Futsal Cup
November 5	Greece	W	3-1 (3-1)	2010 Mediterranean Futsal Cup
November 7	Lebanon	W	3-2 (2-1)	2010 Mediterranean Futsal Cup
November 8	France	W	2-1 (0-1)	2010 Mediterranean Futsal Cup
November 10	Croatia	D	0-2 (Note: Penalty shootout.) 1-1 (0-1)	2010 Mediterranean Futsal Cup

Pld	W	W%	D	D%	L	L%	GF	GA	GR
27	19	70.4%	4	14.8%	4	14.8%	142	57	2.49

- Updated after Croatia game (10.11.2010)

== Overall Record ==
Team	Pld	W	W%	D	D%	L	L%	GF	GA	GR
Libya	138	76	55.1%	25	18.1%	37	26.8%	619	364	1.7
Albania	2	2	100%	0	0%	0	0%	14	3	4.66
Algeria	7	6	85.7%	1	14.3%	0	0%	53	17	3.12
Angola	2	0	0%	0	0%	2	100%	4	10	0.4
Argentina	6	0	0%	1	16.7%	5	83.3%	14	22	0.63
Belarus	3	1	33.3%	1	33.3%	1	33.3%	8	4	2
Brazil	4	0	0%	0	0%	4	100%	7	12	0.58
Cameroon	5	5	100%	0	0%	0	0%	34	7	4.86
Costa Rica	2	1	50%	1	50%	0	0%	8	5	1.6
Croatia	3	0	0%	1	33.3%	2	66.7%	7	9	0.78
Czech Republic	3	0	0%	1	33.3%	2	66.7%	8	11	0.73
Egypt	9	4	44.4%	2	22.3%	3	33.3%	27	34	0.79
England	3	1	33.3%	1	33.3%	1	33.3%	5	5	1
France	1	1	100%	0	0%	0	0%	2	1	2
Georgia	1	1	100%	0	0%	0	0%	4	1	4
Greece	2	2	100%	0	0%	0	0%	9	2	4.5
Guatemala	1	1	100%	0	0%	0	0%	3	2	1.5
Hungary	2	0	0%	1	50%	1	50%	5	6	0.83
Iran	5	0	0%	1	20%	4	80%	8	16	0.5
Iraq	2	2	100%	0	0%	0	0%	15	7	2.14
Ireland	1	1	100%	0	0%	0	0%	4	0	Inf.
Italy	2	0	0%	0	0%	2	100%	2	13	0.15
Japan	2	1	50%	1	50%	0	0%	8	5	1.6
Jordan	3	3	100%	0	0%	0	0%	13	5	2.6
Lebanon	4	3	75%	0	0%	1	25%	18	14	1.29
Lithuania	1	0	0%	0	0%	1	100%	1	2	0.5
Macedonia	4	1	25%	3	75%	0	0%	13	12	1.08
Morocco	13	8	61.5%	2	15.4%	3	23.1%	53	45	1.18
Mozambique	5	3	60%	2	40%	0	0%	23	13	1.76
Nigeria	1	1	100%	0	0%	0	0%	4	0	Inf.
Palestine	2	2	100%	0	0%	0	0%	18	2	9
Portugal	1	0	0%	0	0%	1	100%	0	4	0
Qatar	2	2	100%	0	0%	0	0%	15	1	15
Romania	2	1	50%	1	50%	0	0%	11	8	1.37
Russia	1	0	0%	0	0%	1	100%	0	2	0
Serbia	2	1	50%	1	50%	0	0%	9	3	3
Spain	1	0	0%	0	0%	1	100%	0	3	0
Syria	4	4	100%	0	0%	0	0%	64	8	8
Solomon Islands	1	1	100%	0	0%	0	0%	6	5	1.2
South Africa	2	2	100%	0	0%	0	0%	13	2	6.5
Tunisia	11	10	90.1%	1	9.9%	0	0%	58	22	2.64
Ukraine	1	1	100%	0	0%	0	0%	7	4	1.75
Ukraine 'B'/U-21	3	2	66.7%	1	33.3%	0	0%	18	1	18
Uruguay	2	0	0%	1	50%	1	50%	5	6	0.83
Yemen	1	1	100%	0	0%	0	0%	12	0	Inf.
World Stars	2	0	0%	1	50%	1	50%	8	11	0.73
Zambia	1	1	100%	0	0%	0	0%	1	0	Inf.

- Updated after Croatia game (10.11.2010)
