= 2023 Arab Futsal Cup =

كأس العرب لكرة الصالات 2023

Tournament details
- Host country: Saudi Arabia
- Dates: 6–16 June
- Teams: 12 (from 2 confederations)
- Venue: 1 (in 1 host city)

Final positions
- Champions: Morocco (3rd title)
- Runners-up: Kuwait

Tournament statistics
- Matches played: 25
- Goals scored: 166 (6.64 per match)
- Top scorer(s): (Kuwait) Abduellteif AlAbasi (7 goals)
- Best player: (Morocco) Anás El Ayyane
- Best goalkeeper: (Algeria) Samyr Teffaf

The 2023 Arab Futsal Cup hosted by the Saudi governorate of Jeddah was the seventh edition of the Arab Futsal Cup between 6 and 16 June 2023. For the first time, twelve teams took part: Saudi Arabia, Morocco, Iraq, Kuwait, Egypt, Tajikistan, Palestine, Algeria, Comoros, Lebanon, Libya, and Mauritania.

Morocco is the two-time defending champion. They became the first team to win the title for a record third consecutive time and overall, after defeating Kuwait 7-1 in the final.

== Qualification ==
The following twelve teams qualified for the final tournament.

| Team | Appearance | Previous best performance |
|---|---|---|
| Algeria | 6th | Group stage (1998, 2005, 2007, 2008, 2022) |
| Comoros | 2nd | Group stage (2021) |
| Egypt | 7th | Champions (1998, 2005) |
| Iraq | 4th | Runners-up (2022) |
| Kuwait | 3rd | Semi-finals (2022) |
| Lebanon | 4th | Third place (2005, 2007) |
| Libya | 6th | Champions (2007, 2008) |
| Mauritania | 3rd | Quarter-finals (2022) |
| Morocco | 6th | Champions (2021, 2022) |
| Palestine | 3rd | Fourth place (1998) |
| Saudi Arabia (hosts) | 3rd | Quarter-finals (2022) |
| ~~Sudan~~ w/o (Note: Sudan's futsal team withdrew from the Arab Cup tournament due to the situation in the country. Tajikistan were invited to replace their spot.) | 2nd | Group stage (1998) |
| Tajikistan (invited) | 1st | Debut |

Did not enter

- Bahrain
- Djibouti
- Jordan
- Oman
- Qatar
- Somalia
- Syria
- Tunisia
- Yemen
- United Arab Emirates

== Venue ==
Ministry of Sports Hall in the Prince Abdullah Al Faisal Complex in Jeddah.

== Match officials ==
The following officials were chosen for the tournament.

Referees

- (Algeria) Adel Chenaoua
- (Algeria) Ammar Balahouane
- (Bahrain) Abdulrahman Al Doseri
- (Bahrain) Hussain Al Bahhar
- (Egypt) Atef Hessien
- (Egypt) Mohamed Hassan
- (Egypt) Tarek ElKhataby
- (Iraq) Hasan Mussa
- (Iraq) Hawkar Ahmed
- (Kuwait) Abdulaziz AlSarraf
- (Kuwait) Eisa Abdulhoussain
- (Lebanon) Elias AlHakim
- (Lebanon) Khalil Balhawan
- (Libya) Ali AlAyat
- (Libya) Alghadi Ramzi
- (Morocco) Khalid Hnich
- (Morocco) Said El Haoud
- (Oman) Majid Al Hatmi
- (Palestine) Mohammed AlGhoul
- (Saudi Arabia) Saad Al Hayyan
- (Tunisia) Abdelakram El Hentati
- (Tunisia) Aymen Kammoun
- (United Arab Emirates) Ahmed AlGhais
- (United Arab Emirates) Fahad AlHosani

== Group stage ==
The teams are divided into three groups.

=== Group A ===
| Pos | Team | Pld | W | D | L | GF | GA | GD | Pts | Qualification |
|---|---|---|---|---|---|---|---|---|---|---|
| 1 | Libya | 3 | 2 | 0 | 1 | 9 | 7 | +2 | 6 | Knockout stage |
| 2 | Algeria | 3 | 1 | 2 | 0 | 9 | 8 | +1 | 5 | Knockout stage |
| 3 | Saudi Arabia | 3 | 1 | 1 | 1 | 15 | 9 | +6 | 4 | Knockout stage |
| 4 | Tajikistan | 3 | 0 | 1 | 2 | 3 | 12 | −9 | 1 | |

6 June 2023
16:30 UTC+3

| Saudi Arabia | 4–4 | Algeria |
|---|---|---|
| AlOtaibi 2:05, 39:48; Fqihe 32:22, 33:11 | Report | Betterki 14:01; Bessa 31:18; Al Shanqiti 33:38 (o.g.); Takdjerad 33:59 |

Ministry of Sports Hall, Jeddah
Referee: Mohamed Hassan (Egypt)
6 June 2023
19:00 UTC+3

| Libya | 2–1 | Tajikistan |
|---|---|---|
| Al Ajnef 0:12; Said 36:25 | Report | Sardorov 15:55 |

Ministry of Sports Hall, Jeddah
Referee: Hussain Al Bahhar (Bahrain)

8 June 2023
16:30 UTC+3

| Algeria | 3–2 | Libya |
|---|---|---|
| Bencherif 9:51; Betterki 11:55; Bensaber 31:29 | Report | Al Ajnef 28:43; Darweesh 38:04 |

Ministry of Sports Hall, Jeddah
Referee: Khalil Balhawan (Lebanon)
8 June 2023
19:00 UTC+3

| Tajikistan | 0–8 | Saudi Arabia |
|---|---|---|
| | Report | AlZahrani 15:21; AlDabel 15:59, 39:59; AlMaghribi 16:53; AlOtaibi 17:56; Arwan 28:36; AlAsmari 31:06; AlQarni 35:28 |

Ministry of Sports Hall, Jeddah
Referee: Abdulaziz AlSarraf (Kuwait)

10 June 2023
16:30

| Saudi Arabia | 3–5 | Libya |
|---|---|---|
| AlMaleh 16:15; Arwan 29:25, 37:26 | Report | Al Ajnef 6:43; Al Harthi 9:01 (o.g.); Said 19:59; Lamhammel 20:59, 25:08 |

Ministry of Sports Hall, Jeddah
Referee: Hawkar Ahmed (Iraq)
10 June 2023
19:00

| Tajikistan | 2–2 | Algeria |
|---|---|---|
| Yorov 16:59; Sharipov 21:57 | Report | Takdjerad 29:02; Modjahed 30:57 |

Ministry of Sports Hall, Jeddah
Referee: Tarek ElKhataby (Egypt)

=== Group B ===
| Pos | Team | Pld | W | D | L | GF | GA | GD | Pts | Qualification |
|---|---|---|---|---|---|---|---|---|---|---|
| 1 | Morocco | 3 | 3 | 0 | 0 | 15 | 2 | +13 | 9 | Quarter-finals |
| 2 | Kuwait | 3 | 2 | 0 | 1 | 14 | 10 | +4 | 6 | Quarter-finals |
| 3 | Lebanon | 3 | 1 | 0 | 2 | 10 | 14 | −4 | 3 | Quarter-finals |
| 4 | Comoros | 3 | 0 | 0 | 3 | 5 | 18 | −13 | 0 | |

7 June 2023
14:00 UTC+3

| Morocco | 5–0 | Comoros |
|---|---|---|
| El Fenni 13:40, 34:33; Jawad 15:11; Bouzian 29:43; Boumezou 35:02 | Report |

Ministry of Sports Hall, Jeddah
7 June 2023
16:30 UTC+3

| Kuwait | 5–4 | Lebanon |
|---|---|---|
| AlAbasi 11:10, 25:47; El Khoury 25:00 (o.g.); AlFadhel 27:27; O. AlMansour 37:30 | Report | Koukezian 1:31; Kobeissy 15:08; Rhyem 20:19; Mehrez 36:48 |

Ministry of Sports Hall, Jeddah
Referee: Fahad AlHosani (United Arab Emirates)

9 June 2023
19:00 UTC+3

| Comoros | 2–7 | Kuwait |
|---|---|---|
| Salim 19:59; Ahamada 27:04 | Report | AlKhawari 5:02; AlAbasi 5:41, 28:38, 30:59; AlAlban 7:04; AlBasam 13:43; B. AlMansour 18:07 |

Ministry of Sports Hall, Jeddah
Referee: Ali AlAyat (Libya)
9 June 2023
21:30 UTC+3

| Lebanon | 0–6 | Morocco |
|---|---|---|
| | Report | Boumezou 17:35, 30:58; Bouzid 25:03; El Fenni 28:41, 30:00; El Ayyane 32:48 |

Ministry of Sports Hall, Jeddah
Referee: Hussain Al Bahhar (Bahrain)

11 June 2023

| Morocco | 4–2 | Kuwait |
|---|---|---|
| El Fenni 04:17; Knia 12:07; Bouzid 19:07; Amzal 26:21 | Report | AlShatti 23:28; AlAlban 38:51 |

Ministry of Sports Hall, Jeddah
11 June 2023

| Lebanon | 6–3 | Comoros |
|---|---|---|
| Hamouch 27:33, 30:11, 34:36, 39:59; Issa 29:23; Farchakh 31:44 | Report | Boina 8:23; Hassani 10:16; Kadima 37:46 (pen.) |

Ministry of Sports Hall, Jeddah
Referee: Ahmed AlGhais (United Arab Emirates)

=== Group C ===
| Pos | Team | Pld | W | D | L | GF | GA | GD | Pts | Qualification |
|---|---|---|---|---|---|---|---|---|---|---|
| 1 | Egypt | 3 | 2 | 1 | 0 | 15 | 6 | +9 | 7 | Quarter-finals |
| 2 | Iraq | 3 | 2 | 1 | 0 | 13 | 4 | +9 | 7 | Quarter-finals |
| 3 | Palestine | 3 | 1 | 0 | 2 | 8 | 15 | −7 | 3 | |
| 4 | Mauritania | 3 | 0 | 0 | 3 | 7 | 18 | −11 | 0 | |

7 June 2023
19:00 UTC+3

| Egypt | 7–2 | Mauritania |
|---|---|---|
| Eid 2:27, 35:12; Mostafa 5:04; Ibrahim 26:21; Koki 32:58; A. Mohamed 37:34; Maradona 38:11 | Report | Sylla 2:38; Bouhamadi 14:11 |

Ministry of Sports Hall, Jeddah
Referee: Khalid Hnich (Morocco)
7 June 2023
21:30 UTC+3

| Palestine | 0–6 | Iraq |
|---|---|---|
| | Report | Jumaah 1:01, 15:28; Eesa 5:27; Kareem 25:28; Hadi 29:19; Abed 35:11 |

Ministry of Sports Hall, Jeddah
Referee: Aymen Kammoun (Tunisia)

9 June 2023
14:00 UTC+3

| Mauritania | 4–7 | Palestine |
|---|---|---|
| Sylla 20:00; Keurdidi 36:41, 38:59; J. Mohamed 39:18 | Report | Salloum 4:45; Habous 28:32, 33:09; Shawahna 24:09, 25:39, 34:12; Fahjan 30:07 |

Ministry of Sports Hall, Jeddah
9 June 2023
16:00 UTC+3

| Iraq | 3–3 | Egypt |
|---|---|---|
| Eesa 23:26; Drewil 27:50, 37:15 | Report | Eid 3:54; Koki 7:25; M. Mohamed 9:35 |

Ministry of Sports Hall, Jeddah
Referee: Fahad AlHosani (United Arab Emirates)

11 June 2023

| Egypt | 5–1 | Palestine |
|---|---|---|
| Eid 24:11; Dunga 33:05; A. Mohamed 38:55, 33:58; Fathi 35:47 | Report | Shawahna 40:00 |

Ministry of Sports Hall, Jeddah
Referee: Hussain Al Bahhar (Bahrain)
11 June 2023

| Iraq | 4–1 | Mauritania |
|---|---|---|
| Fahem 12:01; Sami 16:18; Kareem 20:41; Sajed 27:01 | Report | Dioncounda 35:26 |

Ministry of Sports Hall, Jeddah

== Ranking of third-placed teams ==
| Pos | Grp | Team | Pld | W | D | L | GF | GA | GD | Pts | Qualification |
|---|---|---|---|---|---|---|---|---|---|---|---|
| 1 | A | Saudi Arabia | 3 | 1 | 1 | 1 | 15 | 9 | +6 | 4 | Knockout stage |
| 2 | B | Lebanon | 3 | 1 | 0 | 2 | 10 | 14 | −4 | 3 | Knockout stage |
| 3 | C | Palestine | 3 | 1 | 0 | 2 | 8 | 15 | −7 | 3 | |

== Knockout stage ==
=== Quarter-finals ===
13 June 2023
14:00 UTC+3

| Libya | 5–2 | Lebanon |
|---|---|---|
| Said 12:43, 35:24; Aziz 15:26; Al Mariami 28:20; Al Ajnef 39:59 | Report | Mehrez 29:19; Hamouch 30:39 |

Ministry of Sports Hall, Jeddah
Referee: Eisa Abdulhoussain (Kuwait)

13 June 2023
16:30 UTC+3

| Morocco | 5–2 | Saudi Arabia |
|---|---|---|
| Bouzid 3:23; Chaaraoui 7:39; El Ayyane 11:12; Al Khyari 17:05; El Fenni 37:46 | Report | Arwan 37:31, 39:59 |

Ministry of Sports Hall, Jeddah
Referee: Mohamed Hassan (Egypt)

13 June 2023
19:00 UTC+3

| Egypt | 2–6 | Kuwait |
|---|---|---|
| Eid 24:41, 37:03 | Report | AlShatti 8:19; AlTawail 10:17; B. AlMansour 11:37, 21:49; AlOmran 26:41; AlAbasi 39:59 |

Ministry of Sports Hall, Jeddah
Referee: Aymen Kammoun (Tunisia)

13 June 2023
21:30 UTC+3

| Algeria | 2–0 | Iraq |
|---|---|---|
| Bencherif 14:05, 32:05 | Report |

Ministry of Sports Hall, Jeddah
Referee: Fahad AlHosani (United Arab Emirates)

=== Semi-finals ===
14 June 2023
16:30 UTC+3

| Libya | 1–5 | Morocco |
|---|---|---|
| Al Ajnef 33:57 | Report | Amzal 8:35; El Ayyane 10:47; Chaaraoui 13:59; Jawad 17:05, 22:01 |

Ministry of Sports Hall, Jeddah
Referee: Hawkar Ahmed (Iraq)

14 June 2023
19:00 UTC+3

| Kuwait | 3–2 | Algeria |
|---|---|---|
| AlAbasi 8:59; AlAlban 22:26; B. AlMansour 32:21 | Report | Bencherif 27:07; Takdjerad 31:10 |

Ministry of Sports Hall, Jeddah
Referee: Hussain Al Bahhar (Bahrain)

=== Final ===
16 June 2023
19:00 UTC+3

| Morocco | 7–1 | Kuwait |
|---|---|---|
| Amzal 1:39; Chaaraoui 5:22; Jawad 12:45; Bouzid 16:15; Bourite 17:11; Al Khyari 25:46; AlOmran 26:48 (o.g.) | Report | AlTawail 30:36 |

Ministry of Sports Hall, Jeddah
Referee: Mohamed Hassan (Egypt)

== Goalscorers ==
There were 166 goals scored in 25 matches, for an average of 6.64 goals per match.

7 goals

- (Kuwait) Abduellteif AlAbasi

6 goals

- (Egypt) Mostafa Eid
- (Morocco) Idriss Raiss El Fenni

5 goals

- (Saudi Arabia) Nawaf Arwan
- (Lebanon) Majd Hamouch
- (Libya) Ahmed Al Ajnef

4 goals

- (Palestine) Rashid Shawahna
- (Libya) Mohammed Said
- (Morocco) Khalid Bouzid
- (Morocco) Youssef Jawad

3 goals

- (Algeria) Azzedine Takdjerad
- (Algeria) Amine Bencherif
- (Egypt) Abdelrahman Mohamed
- (Saudi Arabia) Abdulelah AlOtaibi
- (Kuwait) Bader AlMansour
- (Lebanon) Issa Mehrez
- (Morocco) Othmane Boumezou
- (Morocco) Anás El Ayyane
- (Morocco) Ismail Amzal
- (Morocco) Soufian Charraoui

2 goals

- (Algeria) Walid Betterki
- (Egypt) Koki
- (Iraq) Haedr Drewil
- (Iraq) Mustafa Jumaah
- (Iraq) Rafid Eesa
- (Iraq) Ghaith Kareem
- (Kuwait) Omar Chotti
- (Kuwait) Nasser AlAlban
- (Kuwait) Abdulrahman Al Taweel
- (Libya) Ibrahim Lamhammel
- (Morocco) Reda Khiyari
- (Mauritania) Yakhouna Sylla
- (Mauritania) Wedadi Keurdidi
- (Palestine) Mohamed Habous
- (Saudi Arabia) Mohsen Fqihe
- (Saudi Arabia) Omar AlDabel

1 goal

- (Algeria) Amar Bessa
- (Algeria) Boumedyen Bensaber
- (Algeria) Sofian Modjahed
- (Comoros) Mazen Saïd Salim
- (Comoros) Souadroudine Ahamada
- (Comoros) Hanady Boyla
- (Comoros) Marwan Hassani
- (Comoros) Hakim Kadima
- (Egypt) Tarek Mostafa
- (Egypt) Ali Ibrahim
- (Egypt) Mohamed Mohamed
- (Egypt) Maradona
- (Egypt) Mahmoud FATHI
- (Egypt) A.I. DONGA
- (Iraq) Haedr Sagit
- (Iraq) Zaher Hadi
- (Iraq) Salim Abed
- (Iraq) Walid Fahim
- (Iraq) Fadi Sami
- (Kuwait) Saleh AlFadhel
- (Kuwait) Omar AlMansour
- (Kuwait) Fahad AlkKhawari
- (Kuwait) Abdulaziz AlBasam
- (Kuwait) Suleiman Al-Omran
- (Lebanon) Steve Koukezian
- (Lebanon) Mohamad Kobeissy
- (Lebanon) Mustafa Rhyem
- (Lebanon) Johnny Farchakh
- (Libya) Suleiman Darweesh
- (Libya) Ziad Aziz
- (Libya) Izz Al-Din Al-Marimi
- (Mauritania) Jemile Mohamed
- (Mauritania) Abd Rahman Bouhamadi
- (Mauritania) Sow Gonconda
- (Morocco) Hamza Bouzian
- (Morocco) Saad KNIA
- (Morocco) Soufiane Borite
- (Palestine) Adnan Salloum
- (Palestine) Imad Fahjan
- (Saudi Arabia) Mansour AlZahrani
- (Saudi Arabia) Abdullah AlMaghrabi
- (Saudi Arabia) Farhan AlAsmari
- (Saudi Arabia) Saleh AlQarni
- (Saudi Arabia) Fares AlMaleh
- (Tajikistan) Faizali Sardorov
- (Tajikistan) Idris Yorov
- (Tajikistan) Muhamadjon Sharipov

1 own goal

- (Lebanon) Georgio El Khoury (against Kuwait)
- (Kuwait) Suleiman Al-Omran (against Morocco)
- (Saudi Arabia) Abdul-Razak Al-Shanqiti (against Algeria)
- (Saudi Arabia) Nasser Al Harthi (against Libya)

== Honors ==
2023 Arab Futsal Cup

Morocco
Third title

- Best Player: Anás El Ayyane - Morocco
- Best Goalkeeper: Samir Teffaf - Algeria
- Top Goal Scorer: Abduellteif AlAbasi (7) - Kuwait
- Fair Play Award:

== Tournament ranking ==
Per statistical convention in football, matches decided in extra time are counted as wins and losses, while matches decided by penalty shoot-out are counted as draws.

| Pos | Team | Pld | W | D | L | GF | GA | GD | Pts | Final result |
|---|---|---|---|---|---|---|---|---|---|---|
| 1 | Morocco | 6 | 6 | 0 | 0 | 32 | 6 | +26 | 18 | Champions |
| 2 | Kuwait | 6 | 4 | 0 | 2 | 24 | 21 | +3 | 12 | Runners-up |
| 3 | Libya | 5 | 3 | 0 | 2 | 15 | 14 | +1 | 9 | Third place |
| 4 | Algeria | 5 | 2 | 2 | 1 | 13 | 11 | +2 | 8 | Fourth place |
| 5 | Iraq | 4 | 2 | 1 | 1 | 13 | 6 | +7 | 7 | Eliminated in Quarter-finals |
| 6 | Egypt | 4 | 2 | 1 | 1 | 17 | 12 | +5 | 7 | Eliminated in Quarter-finals |
| 7 | Saudi Arabia | 4 | 1 | 1 | 2 | 17 | 14 | +3 | 4 | Eliminated in Quarter-finals |
| 8 | Lebanon | 4 | 1 | 0 | 3 | 12 | 19 | -7 | 3 | Eliminated in Quarter-finals |
| 9 | Palestine | 3 | 1 | 0 | 2 | 8 | 15 | -7 | 3 | Eliminated in Group stage |
| 10 | Tajikistan | 3 | 0 | 1 | 2 | 3 | 12 | -9 | 1 | Eliminated in Group stage |
| 11 | Mauritania | 3 | 0 | 0 | 3 | 7 | 18 | -11 | 0 | Eliminated in Group stage |
| 12 | Comoros | 3 | 0 | 0 | 3 | 5 | 18 | -13 | 0 | Eliminated in Group stage |
