= Syria national futsal team =

Syria
- Shirt badge/Association crest
- Nickname(s): The Qasioun Eagles (Arabic: نسور قاسيون) (French: Les aigles du Qasioun)
- Association: Syrian Arab Federation for Football
- Confederation: AFC (Asia)
- FIFA code: SYR
- FIFA ranking: NR (12 December 2025)
Home colours	Away colours

First international
- Libya 17 – 2 Syria (Benghazi, Libya; 28 August 2008)

Biggest win
- Syria 17 – 6 Malta (Tripoli, Libya; 8 November 2010); Syria 15 – 4 Palestine (Kuwait City, Kuwait; 13 December 2011)

Biggest defeat
- Libya 20 – 3 Syria (Benghazi, Libya; 29 August 2008)

FIFA World Cup
- Appearances: none

AFC Futsal Championship
- Appearances: none

WAFF Futsal Championship
- Appearances: 1 (First in 2009)
- Best result: 5th place (2009)

The Syria national futsal team represents Syria in international futsal competitions and is controlled by the Syrian Arab Federation for Football, the governing body for futsal in Syria.

== Tournament records ==
=== FIFA Futsal World Cup ===
- 1989-2020 - Did not enter
- 2024 - Did not qualify

=== AFC Futsal Championship ===
AFC Futsal Championship record
Year	Round	Rank	Pld	W	D	L	GS	GA	GD
(Malaysia) 1999	Did not enter								
(Thailand) 2000	Did not enter								
(Iran) 2001	Did not enter								
(Indonesia) 2002	Did not enter								
(Iran) 2003	Did not enter								
(Macau) 2004	Did not enter								
(Vietnam) 2005	Did not enter								
(Uzbekistan) 2006	Did not enter								
(Japan) 2007	Did not enter								
(Thailand) 2008	Did not enter								
(Uzbekistan) 2010	Did not enter								
(United Arab Emirates) 2012	Did not qualify								
(Vietnam) 2014	Did not enter								
(Uzbekistan) 2016	Did not enter								
(Taiwan) 2018	Did not enter								
(Kuwait) 2022	Did not enter								
(Thailand) 2024	Did not enter								
Total	0/17	–	0	0	0	0	0	0	0

=== Futsal at the Asian Indoor and Martial Arts Games ===
- 2005-2021 - Did not enter

=== WAFF Futsal Championship ===
- 2007 - Did not enter
- 2009 - 5th place
- 2012 - Did not enter
- 2022 - Did not enter

=== Mediterranean Futsal Cup ===
- 2010 - 13th place

=== Arab Futsal Championship ===
- 1998-2007 - Did not enter
- 2008 - Group stage
- 2021-2022 - Did not enter

=== North African Futsal Cup ===
- 2009 - 4th

=== Zayed Arab University Futsal Championship ===
- 2022 - Quarterfinals

== Matches ==
Here are all the matches of Syrian national futsal team

Date	Opposition	Result	Score (HT Score)	Competition
December 23, 2008	Libya	L	2-17	International Friendly
December 24, 2008	Libya	L	3-20	International Friendly
December 23, 2008	Egypt	L	0-8	2008 Arab Futsal Championship
December 25, 2008	Tunisia	L	3-5	2008 Arab Futsal Championship
December 27, 2008	Jordan	L	4-9	2008 Arab Futsal Championship
August 14, 2009	Libya	L	1-11	2009 North African Futsal Cup
August 15, 2009	Tunisia	L	0-11	2009 North African Futsal Cup
August 16, 2009	Egypt	L	3-16	2009 North African Futsal Cup
August 31, 2009	Jordan	L	1-4	2009 West Asian Futsal Championship
September 1, 2009	Iraq	L	2-3	2009 West Asian Futsal Championship
September 2, 2009	Lebanon	L	1-6	2009 West Asian Futsal Championship
September 4, 2009	Bahrain	L	4-7	2009 West Asian Futsal Championship
January 16, 2010	Lebanon	L	1-4	International Friendly
January 17, 2010	Lebanon	L	6-7	International Friendly
November 8, 2010	Malta	W	17-6	International Friendly
December 13, 2011	Palestine	W	15-4	International Friendly
December 25, 2022	Algeria	W	3-1	Zayed Arab University Futsal Championship
December 26, 2022	Palestine	D	3-3	Zayed Arab University Futsal Championship
December 28, 2022	Iraq	L	1-2	Zayed Arab University Futsal Championship

== See also ==
- Syria national football team
- Syria national under-23 football team
- Syria national under-20 football team
- Syria national under-17 football team
- Syria women's national football team
- Syrian Football Association
- Football in Syria
- Sport in Syria
