= Mauritania national futsal team =

Mauritania
- Nickname(s): Des Mourabitounes
- Association: Football Federation of the Islamic Republic of Mauritania (FFIRM)
- Confederation: CAF (Africa)
- Head coach: (Morocco) Selami Abdallah
- FIFA code: MTN
- FIFA ranking: 129 ▼1 (4 April 2025)
Home colours	Away colours

First international
- Egypt 8–1 Mauritania (6th of October City, Egypt; 20 May 2021)

Biggest win
- Mauritania 8–1 Somalia (Dammam, Saudi Arabia; 20 June 2022)

Biggest defeat
- Mauritania 0–13 Morocco (Dammam, Saudi Arabia; 22 June 2022)

Africa Futsal Cup of Nations
- Appearances: 1 (First in 2024)
- Best result: Group Stage (2024)

Arab Futsal Cup
- Appearances: 3 (First in 2021)
- Best result: Quarterfinals (2022)

The Mauritania national futsal team is controlled by the Football Federation of the Islamic Republic of Mauritania, the governing body for futsal in Algeria and represents the country in international futsal competitions.

== Competitive records ==
=== Africa Futsal Cup of Nations ===
Africa Cup of Nations record
Year	Round	Pld	W	D	L	GF	GA	Diff
(Egypt) 1996	Did not enter							
(Egypt) 2000	Did not enter							
2004	Did not enter							
(Libya) 2008	Did not enter							
(Burkina Faso) 2011^{1}	Did not enter							
(South Africa) 2016	Did not enter							
(Morocco) 2020	Did not enter							
(Morocco) 2024	Group Stage	3	1	0	2	15	16	-1
Total	1/7	3	1	0	2	15	16	-1

^1 The 2011 edition was cancelled.

=== Arab Futsal Cup ===
Arab Futsal Cup record
Year	Round	Pld	W	D	L	GF	GA
(Egypt) 1998	Did not enter						
(Egypt) 2005	Did not enter						
(Libya) 2007	Did not enter						
(Egypt) 2008	Did not enter						
(Egypt) 2021	Group stage	3	0	0	3	4	22
(Saudi Arabia) 2022	Quarterfinals	4	1	0	3	12	24
(Saudi Arabia) 2023	Group stage	3	0	0	3	7	18
Total	3/7	10	1	0	9	23	64
