= Comoros national futsal team =

Comoros
- Nickname(s): Les Coelacanthes
- Association: Fédération de Football de Comores (FFC)
- Confederation: CAF (Africa)
- Head coach: (France) Sabry Bezahaf
- FIFA code: COM
- FIFA ranking: 102 (8 May 2026)
| Home colours | Away colours |

First international
- Mauritius 7–2 Comoros (Vacoas-Phoenix, Mauritius; 16 March 2018)

Biggest win
- No win registered yet

Biggest defeat
- Comoros 0–16 South Africa (Vacoas-Phoenix, Mauritius; 17 March 2018)

FIFA World Cup
- Appearances: 0

Africa Futsal Cup of Nations
- Appearances: 0

Arab Futsal Cup
- Appearances: 2 (First in 2021)
- Best result: Group Stage (2021, 2023)

The Comoros national futsal team is controlled by the Comoros Football Federation, the governing body for futsal in Comoros and represents the country in international futsal competitions.

== Competitive records ==
=== FIFA Futsal World Cup ===
FIFA World Cup record
| Year | Round | Pld | W | D | L | GF | GA |
|---|---|---|---|---|---|---|---|
| (Netherlands) 1989 | did not enter | | | | | | |
| (Hong Kong) 1992 | did not enter | | | | | | |
| (Spain) 1996 | did not enter | | | | | | |
| (Guatemala) 2000 | did not enter | | | | | | |
| (Chinese Taipei) 2004 | did not enter | | | | | | |
| (Brazil) 2008 | did not enter | | | | | | |
| (Thailand) 2012 | did not enter | | | | | | |
| (Colombia) 2016 | did not enter | | | | | | |
| (Lithuania) 2020 | did not enter | | | | | | |
| (Uzbekistan) 2024 | did not enter | | | | | | |
| Total | 0/10 | 0 | 0 | 0 | 0 | 0 | 0 |

=== Africa Futsal Cup of Nations ===
Africa Cup of Nations record
| Year | Round | Pld | W | D | L | GF | GA |
|---|---|---|---|---|---|---|---|
| (Egypt) 1996 | did not enter | | | | | | |
| (Egypt) 2000 | did not enter | | | | | | |
| 2004 | did not enter | | | | | | |
| (Libya) 2008 | did not enter | | | | | | |
| (Burkina Faso) 2011^{1} | did not enter | | | | | | |
| (South Africa) 2016 | did not enter | | | | | | |
| (Morocco) 2020 | did not enter | | | | | | |
| (Morocco) 2024 | did not enter | | | | | | |
| Total | 0/8 | 0 | 0 | 0 | 0 | 0 | 0 |

^1 The 2011 edition was cancelled.

=== Arab Futsal Cup ===
Arab Futsal Cup record
| Year | Round | Pld | W | D | L | GF | GA |
|---|---|---|---|---|---|---|---|
| (Egypt) 1998 | did not enter | | | | | | |
| (Egypt) 2005 | did not enter | | | | | | |
| (Libya) 2007 | did not enter | | | | | | |
| (Egypt) 2008 | did not enter | | | | | | |
| (Egypt) 2021 | Group stage | 3 | 0 | 0 | 3 | 3 | 10 |
| (Saudi Arabia) 2022 | did not enter | | | | | | |
| (Saudi Arabia) 2023 | Group stage | 3 | 0 | 0 | 3 | 5 | 18 |
| Total | 2/7 | 6 | 0 | 0 | 6 | 8 | 28 |

== Players ==
=== Current squad ===
The following players were called up to the squad for the 2023 Arab Futsal Cup.

| No. | Pos. | Player | Date of birth (age) | Caps | Club |
|---|---|---|---|---|---|
| 1 | GK | Faouziddine Abal | 22 May 1998 (age 27) | | (France) Garges Djibson |
| 12 | GK | Samir Aboudou | 4 June 1991 (age 34) | | (France) Paris ACASA |
| 15 | GK | Axel Hamza | 10 July 2001 (age 24) | | (France) Saint Henri Futsal |
| 2 | DF | Halim Hadji Ali | 27 May 1994 (age 31) | | (France) Sengol 77 |
| 3 | DF | Asmane Saïd | 4 February 1992 (age 34) | | (France) Caucriauville FC |
| 6 | DF | Barwane Hassani | 24 November 1999 (age 26) | | (France) Collectif Futsal Colmar |
| 9 | DF | Souadroudine Ahamada | 26 May 1990 (age 35) | | (France) FC Issy Futsal |
| 13 | DF | Mounawar Hamadi | 8 July 1995 (age 30) | | (France) AS La Courneuve |
| 4 | FW | Dayane Issmaila | 23 March 1999 (age 27) | | (France) Martel Caluire |
| 5 | FW | Mazen Saïd Salim (captain) | 17 February 1994 (age 32) | | (France) UJS Toulouse |
| 7 | FW | Hakim Kadima | 22 October 1992 (age 33) | | (France) GOAL FC |
| 8 | FW | Houladi Ali Boina | 14 February 1995 (age 31) | | (France) FC Port de Bouc |
| 10 | FW | Nadhir Bacar | 7 June 1995 (age 30) | | (France) Lyon Futsal |
| 11 | FW | Youssef Abdou Mhadji | 3 September 2002 (age 23) | | (France) Neuilly FC 92 |
| 14 | FW | Salim Abdou Mohamed | 3 August 1995 (age 30) | | (France) Neuilly FC 92 |

== See also ==
- Comoros national football team
- Comoros national beach soccer team
