= Futsal in Libya =

Futsal in Libya is governed by the Libyan Football Federation. It is one of the most popular sports in the country, and is widely played.

== National team ==
The Libya national futsal team made their first official appearance at the African Futsal Championship in Egypt in 2000. They have won several titles, including the African Futsal Championship in 2008, the Arab Futsal Championship in 2007, 2008 & the North African Futsal Cup in 2005, 2009 & 2010.

Libya reached the finals of the FIFA Futsal World Cup for the first time in 2008.

== See also ==
List of Libya national futsal team matches
