= Yemen national futsal team =

National futsal team of Yemen

Yemen
- Nickname(s): Al-Yemen A'Sa'eed (اليمن السعيد); The Red (Al-Ahmar) (الأحمر)
- Association: Yemen Football Association
- Confederation: AFC (Asia)
- FIFA code: YEM
- FIFA ranking: NR (24 September 2026)
Home colours	Away colours

First international
- Algeria 10 – 1 Yemen (Port Said, Egypt; 23 December 2008)

Biggest win
- no wins

Biggest defeat
- Lebanon 16 – 2 Yemen (Port Said, Egypt; 24 December 2008)

FIFA World Cup
- Appearances: 0

AFC Futsal Championship
- Appearances: 0

Arab Futsal Championship
- Appearances: 1 (First in 2008)
- Best result: 1st round (2008)

The Yemen national futsal team represents Yemen in international futsal competitions and is controlled by the Yemen Football Association.

== Tournament records ==
=== FIFA Futsal World Cup ===
- 1989-2024 - Did not enter

=== AFC Futsal Championship ===
- 1999-2018 - Did not enter

=== Futsal at the Asian Indoor and Martial Arts Games ===
- 2005-2017 - Did not enter

=== WAFF Futsal Championship ===
- 2007-2012 - Did not enter

=== Arab Futsal Championship ===
- 1998-2007 - Did not enter
- 2008 - 1st round

=== Matches ===
Here are all the matches of Yemen national futsal team

Date	Opposition	Result	Score (HT Score)	Competition
December 23, 2008	Algeria	L	1-10	2008 Arab Futsal Championship
December 24, 2008	Lebanon	L	2-16	2008 Arab Futsal Championship
December 26, 2008	Libya	L	0-12 (0-8)	2008 Arab Futsal Championship
December 27, 2008	Iraq	L	2-8	2008 Arab Futsal Championship
July 9, 2012	FC Treefrog	W	6-3	2012 Birmingham Futsal Monday Night League

=== Results By Years ===
Year	M	W	D	L	GF	GA	GD	Ref
2008	4	0	0	4	5	46	-41	
2009-2025	Did Not Compete							
Total	4	0	0	4	5	46	-41	
