= Tunisia national futsal team =

Tunisia
- Nickname(s): نسور قرطاج (Eagles of Carthage)
- Association: Tunisian Football Federation
- Other affiliation: UAFA (Arab World)
- Confederation: CAF (Africa)
- Sub-confederation: UNAF (North Africa)
- FIFA code: TUN
First colours	Second colours	Third colours

FIFA ranking
- Current: NR (24 September 2026)

First international
- Tunisia 3–10 Egypt (Cairo, Egypt; 20 July 2005)

Biggest win
- Tunisia 11–0 Syria (Tunis, Tunisia; 15 August 2009)

Biggest defeat
- Morocco 10–1 Tunisia (Tripoli, Libya; 24 September 2005); Egypt 11–2 Tunisia (Tripoli, Libya; 11 January 2007)

Futsal Africa Cup of Nations
- Appearances: 2 (first in 2008)
- Best result: Group stage (2008, 2016)

Arab Futsal Cup
- Appearances: 3 (first in 2005)
- Best result: Group stage (2005, 2007, 2008)

North African Futsal Tournament
- Appearances: 3 (first in 2005)
- Best result: Third place (2005, 2009, 2010)

The Tunisia national futsal team has represented Tunisia in men's international futsal competitions. The team is administered by the Tunisian Football Federation (TFF), which governs football in Tunisia. On a continental level, the team competes under the Confederation of African Football (CAF), which governs associate football in Africa, and is also affiliated with FIFA for global competitions. Additionally, the team is a member of the Union of North African Football (UNAF) and the Union of Arab Football Associations (UAFA). The team is colloquially known as Eagles of Carthage by fans and the media, with the bald eagle serving as its symbol. Their home kit is primarily white and their away kit is red, which is a reference to the national flag of the country.

Tunisia has never qualified for the FIFA Futsal World Cup and its participation in Futsal Africa Cup of Nations is sporadic, having only qualified for two editions in 2008 and 2016 and was eliminated in the group stage in both appearances. The team participated in the Arab Futsal Cup three times in 2005, 2007 and 2008 and was eliminated in the group stage on all occasions. He also participated in the North African Futsal Tournament in 2005, 2009 and 2010, finishing in third place on all occasions. Tunisia entered the Mediterranean Futsal Cup in 2010 and reached the quarter-finals.

Currently there is no futsal activity in Tunisia and the team is not ranked in the FIFA Futsal World Ranking.

== Competitive Records ==
Champions Runners-up Third place Fourth place

- Red border color indicates tournament was held on home soil.

=== FIFA Futsal World Cup ===
FIFA Futsal World Cup record
Year	Round	Position	Pld	W	D*	L	GF	GA
(Netherlands) 1989	Did not enter							
(Hong Kong) 1992	Did not enter							
(Spain) 1996	Did not enter							
(Guatemala) 2000	Did not enter							
(Taiwan) 2004	Did not enter							
(Brazil) 2008	Did not qualify							
(Thailand) 2012	Did not qualify							
(Colombia) 2016	Did not qualify							
(Lithuania) 2021	Did not enter							
(Uzbekistan) 2024	Did not enter							
Total	–	0/10	–	–	–	–	–	–

=== Futsal Africa Cup of Nations ===
Futsal Africa Cup of Nations record
Year	Round	Position	Pld	W	D*	L	GF	GA
(Egypt) 1996	Did not enter							
(Egypt) 2000	Did not enter							
2004	Did not enter							
(Libya) 2008	Group stage	7th	4	1	0	3	9	15
(Burkina Faso) 2011	Cancelled							
(South Africa) 2016	Group stage	6th	3	1	0	2	10	9
(Morocco) 2020	Did not enter							
(Morocco) 2024	Did not enter							
(Morocco) 2026	Did not enter							
Total	Group stage	2/8	7	2	0	5	19	24

=== Arab Futsal Cup ===
Arab Futsal Cup record
Year	Round	Position	Pld	W	D*	L	GF	GA
(Egypt) 1998	Did not enter							
(Egypt) 2005	Group stage		2	0	0	2	9	22
(Libya) 2007	Group stage	6th	5	1	0	4	15	29
(Egypt) 2008	Group stage		3	1	0	2	7	11
(Egypt) 2021	Did not enter							
(Saudi Arabia) 2022	Did not enter							
(Saudi Arabia) 2023	Did not enter							
Total	Group stage	3/7	10	2	0	8	31	62

=== North African Futsal Tournament ===
North African Futsal Tournament record
Year	Round	Position	Pld	W	D*	L	GF	GA
(Libya) 2005	Third place	3rd	4	0	0	4	11	37
(Tunisia) 2009	Third place	3rd	3	1	0	2	11	10
(Libya) 2010	Third place	3rd	4	2	0	2	11	16
Total	Third place	3/3	11	3	0	8	33	63

=== Mediterranean Futsal Cup ===
Mediterranean Futsal Cup record
Year	Round	Position	Pld	W	D*	L	GF	GA
(Libya) 2010	Quarter-finals	8th	6	3	1	2	22	19
Total	Quarter-finals	1/1	6	3	1	2	22	19

== Honours ==
- North African Futsal Tournament

(bronze) Third Place (3): 2005, 2009, 2010
