= North African Futsal Tournament =

- Organiser(s): UNAF
- Founded: 2005
- Abolished: 2010
- Region: North Africa
- Teams: 5 (plus guests)
- Last champions: Libya (3rd title)
- Most championships: Libya (3 titles)
- Website: unafonline.org

The North African Futsal Tournament was an international futsal tournament organized by the Union of North African Football (UNAF) However, the tournament invites teams from other nations. Libya are the most successful nation winning the tournament three times.

== Results ==
Ed.	Year	Host	First place game			Third place game		
Ed.	Year	Host	(gold) Champion	Score	(silver) Runner-up	(bronze) Third place	Score	Fourth place
1	2005	Libya	Libya	round-robin	Morocco	Tunisia		
2	2009	Tunisia	Libya	round-robin	Egypt	Tunisia	round-robin	Syria
3	2010	Libya	Libya	round-robin	Morocco	Tunisia	round-robin	Palestine

== Statistics ==
=== Summary ===
Team	Winners	Runners-up	Third place	Fourth place
Libya	3 (2005*, 2009, 2010*)	—	—	—
Morocco	—	2 (2005, 2010)	—	—
Egypt	—	1 (2009)	—	—
Tunisia	—	—	3 (2005, 2009*, 2010)	—
Syria	—	—	—	1 (2009)
Palestine	—	—	—	1 (2010)

* Hosts

Italic Invited nation

=== Participating nations ===
Team	(Libya) 2005	(Tunisia) 2009	(Libya) 2010	Apps.
Algeria	×	×	×	0
Egypt	×	2nd	×	1
Libya	1st	1st	1st	3
Morocco	2nd	×	2nd	2
Tunisia	3rd	3rd	3rd	3
Invited nations
Syria		4th		1
Palestine			4th	1

- 1st – Champions
- 2nd – Runners-up
- 3rd – Third place
- 4th – Fourth place
- Q – Qualified for upcoming tournament
- × — Did not enter / Withdrew / Disqualified
- — Hosts
