= Algeria national futsal team =

Algeria
- Nickname(s): الخُضر "El Khadra" / "Les Verts" (The Greens) الأفناك (The Fennecs) محاربي الصحراء (The Desert Warriors)
- Association: Algerian Football Federation (FAF)
- Confederation: CAF (Africa)
- Head coach: Nordine Benamrouche
- Home stadium: Hacène Harcha Arena, Algiers
- FIFA code: ALG
- FIFA ranking: 93 ▼4 (24 September 2026)
Home colours	Away colours

First international
- Paraguay 5–0 Algeria (Netherlands; 5 January 1989)

Biggest win
- Yemen 1–10 Algeria (Port Said, Egypt; 23 December 2008)

Biggest defeat
- Algeria 1–11 Palestine (Misrata, Libya; 25 September 2010); Slovenia 11–1 Algeria (Tripoli, Libya; 3 November 2010)

FIFA World Cup
- Appearances: 1 (First in 1989)
- Best result: Group stage (1989)

Futsal Africa Cup of Nations
- Appearances: 1 (First in 2026)
- Best result: Fourth place (2026)

Arab Futsal Cup
- Appearances: 6 (First in 1998)
- Best result: Semi-finals (2023)

The Algeria national futsal team (French: Équipe nationale algérienne de Futsal), represents Algeria in international futsal competitions, and is governed by the Algerian Football Federation (FAF).

Although the Futsal Fennecs were one of the first two African teams to qualify for a FIFA Futsal World Cup, they have yet to qualify for the Africa Cup of Nations. The team has mainly competed in the Arab Futsal Cup, with their best international performance coming at the 2023 edition, where they reached the semi-finals.

== History ==
Following the establishment of the FIFA Futsal World Championship in 1989, Algeria was one of two African countries invited to the tournament. On 5 January 1989, they played their first international match against Paraguay. The team went on to lose its next two matches, ending their campaign at the group stage.

After their participation in the World Cup, the team went into a hiatus before returning for the inaugural Arab Futsal Championship in 1998. Algeria exited at the group stage without recording a win, a result that was repeated at the 2005 edition. It was not until the 2007 tournament that Algeria secured its first victory, defeating Tunisia 4–3 and finishing fifth out of six teams.

At the following edition, Algeria recorded its largest victory to date with a 10–1 win over Yemen; however, defeats in their remaining matches saw the team continue its run of group-stage eliminations. In 2010, Algeria made its debut at the North African Futsal Tournament, where it finished last after losing all of its matches.

Algeria's first attempt to qualify for the Futsal Africa Cup of Nations came in 2020, when they faced Libya in a two-legged tie and lost both matches, with an aggregate score of 12–6.

By 2023, following the reinforcement of the squad with diaspora players based in France, the team showed significant improvement. This progress was highlighted by a historic run at the 2023 Arab Cup, where Algeria reached the semi-finals, with their only defeat coming against Kuwait.

In December of the same year, the team played its first international friendly matches against the Dominican Republic, winning both encounters 8–2 and 5–2. In February 2024, Algeria contested its second qualification campaign against Libya; the improved side earned a 4–4 draw away before losing the return leg 2–1 to a last-minute goal.

== Competitive record ==
=== FIFA Futsal World Cup ===
Year	Round	Position	GP	W	D	L	GS	GA
(Netherlands) 1989	Group stage	15th	3	0	0	3	5	17
(Hong Kong) 1992	did not enter							
(Spain) 1996	did not enter							
(Guatemala) 2000	did not enter							
(Chinese Taipei) 2004	did not enter							
(Brazil) 2008	did not enter							
(Thailand) 2012	did not enter							
(Colombia) 2016	did not enter							
(Lithuania) 2021	did not qualify							
(Uzbekistan) 2024	did not qualify							
Total	1/10		3	0	0	3	5	17

=== Arab Futsal Cup ===
Year	Round	Position	GP	W	D	L	GS	GA
(Egypt) 1998	Group stage	8th	3	0	0	3	12	32
(Egypt) 2005	Group stage	7th	3	0	0	3	6	14
(Libya) 2007	Round-robin	5th	5	1	1	3	11	17
(Egypt) 2008	Group stage	7th	4	1	0	3	20	25
(Egypt) 2021	did not enter							
(Saudi Arabia) 2022	Group stage	9th	2	0	0	2	2	5
(Saudi Arabia) 2023	Semi-finals	4th	5	2	2	1	13	11
Total	6/7		22	4	3	15	64	104

=== Futsal Africa Cup of Nations ===
Year	Round	Position	GP	W	D	L	GS	GA
(Egypt) 1996	did not enter							
(Egypt) 2000	did not enter							
2004	did not enter							
(Libya) 2008	did not enter							
(Burkina Faso) 2011	Cancelled							
(South Africa) 2016	did not enter							
(Morocco) 2020	did not qualify							
(Morocco) 2024	did not qualify							
(Morocco) 2026	Third place match	4th	5	1	1	3	12	21
2028	To be determined							
Total	1/8		5	1	1	3	12	21

=== North African Futsal Tournament ===
Year	Round	Position	GP	W	D	L	GS	GA
(Libya) 2005	did not enter							
(Tunisia) 2009	did not enter							
(Libya) 2010	Round-robin	5th	4	0	0	4	5	34
Total	1/3		4	0	0	4	5	34

=== Mediterranean Futsal Cup ===
Year	Round	Position	GP	W	D	L	GS	GA
(Libya) 2010	Classification round	12th	6	2	0	4	14	26
Total	1/1		6	2	0	4	14	26

== Players ==
=== Current squad ===
The following players were called by the coach Noredine Benamrouche for the 2026 Futsal Africa Cup of Nations final tournament.

No.	Pos.	Player	Date of birth (age)	Club
	GK	Samyr Teffaf	23 January 1999 (age 27)	(French Football Federation) Garges Djibson
	GK	Wassim Si Chaib	22 November 2001 (age 24)	(French Football Federation) Paris ACASA
	DF	Amar Bessa	12 September 1994 (age 32)	(French Football Federation) Paris ACASA
	FP	Abdelraouf Djelloul	27 November 1990 (age 35)	(Algerian Football Federation) Al Hilal BBA
	FP	Azeddine Takdjerad	22 April 1998 (age 28)	(French Football Federation) UJS Toulouse
	FP	Moussa Haddad	15 May 1998 (age 28)	(French Football Federation) Paris ACASA
	FP	Mathieu Hammad	9 June 1996 (age 30)	(French Football Federation) Les Artistes Futsal
	MF	Abdelhak Djebrani	6 October 1992 (age 34)	(Algerian Football Federation) Al Hilal BBA
	FP	Ali Skender Si Chaib	18 May 1993 (age 33)	(French Football Federation) Paris ACASA
	FP	Bilal Bentout	6 December 2003 (age 22)	(French Football Federation) AS Avion Futsal
	FP	Soufian Bakkioui	19 October 2004 (age 22)	(Royal Belgian Football Association) Bouraza Ft Brussels
	MF	Walid Riach	15 January 1997 (age 29)	(Algerian Football Federation) CF El Kseur
	FP	Walid Betterki	10 October 1995 (age 31)	(French Football Federation) AF Vaulx-en-Velin
	FW	Rayane Aït Hamadouche	12 November 1999 (age 26)	(Algerian Football Federation) MC El Bayadh

== See also ==
- Sport in Algeria
- Algeria national football team
