= Lebanon national futsal team =

Men's national futsal team representing Lebanon

Lebanon
- Nickname(s): رجال الأرز (The Cedars)
- Association: Lebanese Football Association (LFA)
- Confederation: AFC (Asia); WAFF (West Asia)
- Head coach: Ricardo Íñíguez Calabuig
- Home stadium: Sadaka Stadium
- FIFA code: LBN
- FIFA ranking: 71 ▲1 (24 September 2026)
- Highest FIFA ranking: 53 (November 2024 – April 2025)
- Lowest FIFA ranking: 54 (August 2025)
Home colours	Away colours

First international
- Iran 15–2 Lebanon (Tehran, Iran, 27 July 2003)

Biggest win
- Lebanon 16–2 Yemen (Port Said, Egypt, 24 December 2008)

Biggest defeat
- Iran 15–2 Lebanon (Tehran, Iran, 27 July 2003)

AFC Futsal Asian Cup
- Appearances: 11 (First in 2003)
- Best result: Quarter-finals (7 times)

Arab Futsal Cup
- Appearances: 4 (First in 2005)
- Best result: Third place (2005, 2007)

The Lebanon national futsal team (Arabic: منتخب لبنان لكرة الصالات; French: Équipe du Liban de futsal) represents Lebanon in international futsal competitions. Nicknamed "the Cedars", the team is controlled by the Lebanese Football Association (LFA).

Lebanon has yet to participate in the FIFA Futsal World Cup. Their closest attempt came in 2021, when they lost to Vietnam in the play-offs on the away goals rule. Lebanon are regulars at the AFC Futsal Asian Cup, having reached the quarter-finals on seven occasions. The team also competes in the Arab Futsal Cup and the WAFF Futsal Championship.

== Competitive record ==
=== FIFA Futsal World Cup ===
FIFA Futsal World Cup record									Qualification record						
Host nation(s) and year	Round	Pos	Pld	W	D	L	GF	GA	Outcome	Pld	W	D	L	GF	GA
(Netherlands) 1989	did not enter								did not enter						
(Hong Kong) 1992	did not enter								did not enter						
(Spain) 1996	did not enter								did not enter						
(Guatemala) 2000	did not enter								did not enter						
(Taiwan) 2004	did not qualify								The 2004 AFC Futsal Championship served as the qualifying tournament						
(Brazil) 2008	did not qualify								The 2008 AFC Futsal Championship served as the qualifying tournament						
(Thailand) 2012	did not qualify								The 2012 AFC Futsal Championship served as the qualifying tournament						
(Colombia) 2016	did not qualify								The 2016 AFC Futsal Championship served as the qualifying tournament						
(Lithuania) 2021	did not qualify								Play-off defeat	2	0	2	0	1	1
(Uzbekistan) 2024	did not qualify								The 2024 AFC Futsal Asian Cup served as the qualifying tournament						
Total	0/10	–	–	–	–	–	–	–	Total	2	0	2	0	1	1

=== AFC Futsal Asian Cup ===
AFC Futsal Asian Cup record									Qualification record							
Host nation(s) and year	Round	Pld	W	D	L	GF	GA	GD	Outcome	Pld	W	D	L	GF	GA	GD
(Malaysia) 1999	did not enter								did not enter							
(Thailand) 2000	did not enter								did not enter							
(Iran) 2001	did not enter								did not enter							
(Indonesia) 2002	did not enter								did not enter							
(Iran) 2003	Group stage	3	1	0	2	8	23	-15	qualified as invitees (No qualification)							
(Macau) 2004	Quarter-finals	5	2	1	2	22	17	+5	qualified as invitees (No qualification)							
(Vietnam) 2005	Round 2 (Plate)	8	6	0	2	51	25	+26	qualified as invitees (No qualification)							
(Uzbekistan) 2006	Group stage	3	0	1	2	12	18	-6	qualified as top 11 team at the previous tournament							
(Japan) 2007	Quarter-finals	4	2	0	2	19	15	+4	1st of 4	3	2	1	0	23	4	+19
(Thailand) 2008	Quarter-finals	4	1	1	2	13	23	-10	qualified as top 11 team at the previous tournament							
(Uzbekistan) 2010	Quarter-finals	4	2	0	2	12	16	-4	1st of 3, 1st of 4	4	3	1	0	16	8	+8
(United Arab Emirates) 2012	Quarter-finals	4	2	0	2	10	11	-1	2nd of 4, 3rd of 4	5	3	0	2	15	8	+7
(Vietnam) 2014	Quarter-finals	4	1	1	2	14	19	-5	1st of 5	4	3	1	0	13	9	+4
(Uzbekistan) 2016	Group stage	3	0	2	1	7	9	-2	1st of 4	3	3	0	0	16	6	+10
(Taiwan) 2018	Quarter-finals	4	2	2	0	11	7	+4	1st of 3	2	2	0	0	6	2	+4
(Turkmenistan) ~~2020~~	cancelled								1st of 4	3	3	0	0	20	4	+16
(Kuwait) 2022	Group stage	3	0	1	2	3	17	-14	1st of 4	3	2	1	0	11	7	+4
(Thailand) 2024	did not qualify								3rd of 4	3	1	0	2	10	12	-2
(Indonesia) 2026	Group stage	3	0	0	3	2	11	-9	2nd of 4	3	1	1	1	3	6	-3
Total:13/18	Quarter-finals	52	19	9	24	184	211	-27	Total	33	23	5	7	133	66	+67

=== Asian Indoor and Martial Arts Games ===
Asian Indoor and Martial Arts Games record
Host nation(s) and year	Round	Pld	W	D	L	GF	GA
(Thailand) 2005	did not enter						
(Macau) 2007	Quarter-finals	5	3	1	1	16	17
(Vietnam) 2009	did not enter						
(South Korea) 2013	Quarter-finals	3	1	1	1	14	11
(Turkmenistan) 2017	Group stage	2	0	0	2	4	10
Total	3/5	10	4	2	4	34	38

=== Arab Futsal Cup ===
Arab Futsal Cup record
Host nation(s) and year	Round	Pld	W	D	L	GF	GA
(Egypt) 1998	did not enter						
(Egypt) 2005	Third place	4	2	0	2	24	27
(Libya) 2007	Third place	5	2	0	3	24	21
(Egypt) 2008	Fourth place	6	3	0	3	33	20
(Egypt) 2021	did not enter						
(Saudi Arabia) 2022	did not enter						
(Saudi Arabia) 2023	Quarter-finals	4	1	0	3	12	19
Total	4/7	19	8	0	11	93	87

=== WAFF Futsal Championship ===
WAFF Futsal Championship record
Host nation(s) and year	Round	Pld	W	D	L	GF	GA
(Iran) 2007	Runners-up	3	2	0	1	12	9
(Jordan) 2009	Third place	4	2	0	2	11	8
(Iran) 2012	did not enter						
(Kuwait) 2022	Semi-finals	4	1	2	1	9	11
Total	3/4	11	5	2	4	32	28

=== Mediterranean Futsal Cup ===
Mediterranean Futsal Cup record
Host nation(s) and year	Round	Pld	W	D	L	GF	GA
(Libya) 2010	Sixth place	5	2	1	2	20	13
Total	1/1	5	2	1	2	20	13

== Results and fixtures ==
=== 2026 ===
15 January 2026 Friendly	Armenia	8–3	Lebanon	Yerevan, Armenia
18:00 UTC+2		Report		Stadium: FFA Technical Academy Center

17 January 2026 Friendly	Armenia	2–0	Lebanon	Yerevan, Armenia
15:00 UTC+2		Report		Stadium: FFA Technical Academy Center

27 January 2026 2026 Asian Cup	Thailand	2–0	Lebanon	Jakarta, Indonesia
13:00 UTC+7	Worasak 26:11; Osamanmusa 33:13	Report		Stadium: Jakarta International Velodrome; Referee: Anatoliy Rubakov (Uzbekistan)

29 January 2026 2026 Asian Cup	Lebanon	0–2	Vietnam	Jakarta, Indonesia
13:00 UTC+7		Report	Đinh Công Viên 0'19"; Vũ Ngọc Ánh 3'34"	Stadium: Jakarta International Velodrome; Referee: Helday Idang (Malaysia), Lee Po-Fu (Chinese Taipei)

31 January 2026 2026 Asian Cup	Kuwait	7–2	Lebanon	Jakarta, Indonesia
15:00 UTC+7	Borashed 7'53"; Al-Sarraj 8'57"; Al-Abasi 15'01", 21'18"; Al-Ajmi 18'08"; Al-Enezi 28'52"; Al-Fadhel 39'00"	Report	Cheaito 31'50"; Souss 36'03"	Stadium: Jakarta International Velodrome; Referee: Sukhrob Sattorov (Tajikistan), Anatoliy Rubakov (Uzbekistan)

5 November 2026 Friendly	Georgia	v	Lebanon	Telavi, Georgia
19:00 UTC+4				Stadium: Telavi Sports Palace

7 November 2026 Friendly	Georgia	v	Lebanon	Telavi, Georgia
14:00 UTC+4				Stadium: Telavi Sports Palace

== Players ==
=== Current squad ===
The following players were called up for the 2026 AFC Futsal Asian Cup, between 27 January and 7 February 2026.

No.	Pos.	Player	Date of birth (age)	Club
1	GK	Karim Joueidi		(Lebanese Football Association) Central Jounieh
2	GK	Giorgio Makhoul		(Lebanese Football Association) Nejmeh
4	FP	Mohamad Ossman		(Lebanese Football Association) Lebanese Army
4	FP	Ali Al Hadi Jammoul		(Lebanese Football Association) Nejmeh
5	FP	Ali Hamam		(Lebanese Football Association) Beirut Stars
6	FP	Majed Hamouch		(Lebanese Football Association) Central Jounieh
7	FP	Hassan Maatouk		(Lebanese Football Association) Beirut Stars
8	FP	Hadi Chaeito		(Lebanese Football Association) 1875 Sportif
9	FP	Mustafa Rhyem		(Lebanese Football Association) Nejmeh
10	FP	Mohsen Mohsen		(Lebanese Football Association) Nejmeh
11	FP	Mario Abou Jaoude		(Lebanese Football Association) NSK
12	FP	Abel Al Rahman Sous		(Lebanese Football Association) Mabarra
13	FP	Najib El Kallab		(Lebanese Football Association) Beirut Stars
14	FP	John Jabbour		(Lebanese Football Association) Nejmeh

=== Previous squads ===
AFC Futsal Asian Cup squads

- 2018 AFC Futsal Championship squads
- 2022 AFC Futsal Asian Cup squads
