= 2022 Arab Futsal Cup =

كأس العرب لكرة القدم داخل الصالات 2022

Tournament details
- Host country: Saudi Arabia
- Dates: 20−28 June
- Teams: 10 (from 2 confederations)
- Venue: 1 (in 1 host city)

Final positions
- Champions: Morocco (2nd title)
- Runners-up: Iraq

Tournament statistics
- Matches played: 12
- Goals scored: 101 (8.42 per match)
- Top scorer: (Kuwait) Abdulrahman Al Taweel (9 goals)
- Best player: (Morocco) Soufiane El Mesrar
- Best goalkeeper: (Iraq) Zaher Hadi
- Fair play award: Egypt

The 2022 Arab Futsal Cup hosted by the Saudi city of Dammam was the sixth edition of the Arab Futsal Cup between 20 and 28 June 2022. Ten teams took part: Saudi Arabia, Morocco, Palestine, Iraq, Kuwait, Mauritania, Egypt, Libya, Algeria and Somalia.

Morocco defeated Iraq 3–0 in the final to win their second title.

== Qualification ==
The following ten teams qualified for the final tournament.

Team	Appearance	Previous best performance
Algeria	5th	Group stage (1998, 2005, 2007, 2008)
Egypt	6th	Champions (1998, 2005)
Iraq	3rd	Group stage (2005, 2008)
Kuwait	2nd	Group stage (2021)
Libya	5th	Champions (2007, 2008)
Mauritania	2nd	Group stage (2021)
Morocco	5th	Champions (2021)
Palestine	2nd	Fourth place (1998)
Saudi Arabia (hosts)	2nd	Group stage (2021)
Somalia	2nd	Group stage (1998)

== Venue ==
Dammam	2022 Arab Futsal Cup is located in Saudi Arabia
The Green Hall	2022 Arab Futsal Cup is located in Saudi Arabia
Capacity: 5,200	2022 Arab Futsal Cup is located in Saudi Arabia

== Group stage ==
The teams are divided into three groups.

=== Group A ===
Pos	Team	Pld	W	D	L	GF	GA	GD	Pts	Qualification
1	Morocco	3	3	0	0	35	4	+31	9	Quarter-finals
2	Kuwait	3	2	0	1	20	10	+10	6	Quarter-finals
3	Mauritania	3	1	0	2	10	21	−11	3	Quarter-finals
4	Somalia	3	0	0	3	3	33	−30	0	

20 June 2022
14:00

Morocco	6–4	Kuwait

The Green Hall, Dammam
20 June 2022
16:30

Mauritania	8–1	Somalia

The Green Hall, Dammam

21 June 2022
14:00

Kuwait	7–2	Mauritania

The Green Hall, Dammam
21 June 2022
16:30

Somalia	0–16	Morocco

The Green Hall, Dammam

22 June 2022
14:00

Mauritania	0–13	Morocco

The Green Hall, Dammam
22 June 2022
16:30

Somalia	2–9	Kuwait

The Green Hall, Dammam

=== Group B ===
Pos	Team	Pld	W	D	L	GF	GA	GD	Pts	Qualification
1	Egypt	2	1	1	0	5	3	+2	4	Quarter-finals
2	Iraq	2	1	1	0	6	5	+1	4	Quarter-finals
3	Algeria	2	0	0	2	2	5	−3	0	

20 June 2022
19:00

Egypt	3–3	Iraq

The Green Hall, Dammam

21 June 2022
19:00

Iraq	3–2	Algeria

The Green Hall, Dammam

22 June 2022
19:00

Algeria	0–2	Egypt

The Green Hall, Dammam

=== Group C ===
Pos	Team	Pld	W	D	L	GF	GA	GD	Pts	Qualification
1	Saudi Arabia	2	1	0	1	9	9	0	3	Quarter-finals
2	Palestine	2	1	0	1	6	6	0	3	Quarter-finals
3	Libya	2	1	0	1	5	5	0	3	Quarter-finals

Updated to match(es) played on 22 June 2022. Source:
20 June 2022
21:30

Saudi Arabia	4–6	Palestine

The Green Hall, Dammam

21 June 2022
21:30

Palestine	0–2	Libya

The Green Hall, Dammam

22 June 2022
21:30

Libya	3–5	Saudi Arabia

The Green Hall, Dammam

== Ranking of third-placed teams ==
Pos	Grp	Team	Pld	W	D	L	GF	GA	GD	Pts	Qualification
1	C	Libya	2	1	0	1	5	5	0	3	Knockout stage
2	A	Mauritania	3	1	0	2	10	21	−11	3	Knockout stage
3	B	Algeria	2	0	0	2	2	5	−3	0	

Updated to match(es) played on 22 July 2022. Source:

== Knockout stage ==
=== Bracket ===
Quarter-finals
24 June – The Green Hall, Dammam
Morocco	3
Libya	0
24 June – The Green Hall, Dammam
Egypt	3
Mauritania	2
24 June – The Green Hall, Dammam
Saudi Arabia	2
Iraq	3
24 June – The Green Hall, Dammam
Kuwait	4(4)
Palestine	4(1)

Semi-finals
26 June – The Green Hall, Dammam
Morocco	5
Egypt	2
26 June – The Green Hall, Dammam
Iraq	2
Kuwait	1

Final
28 June – The Green Hall, Dammam
Morocco	3
Iraq	0

=== Quarter-finals ===
24 June 2022
13:30

Morocco	3–0	Libya

The Green Hall, Dammam
24 June 2022
16:30

Egypt	3–2	Mauritania

The Green Hall, Dammam
24 June 2022
19:30

Saudi Arabia	2–3 (a.e.t.)	Iraq

The Green Hall, Dammam
24 June 2022
22:30

Kuwait	4–4 (a.e.t.)	Palestine
Penalties
	4–1

The Green Hall, Dammam

=== Semi-finals ===
26 June 2022
16:30

Morocco	5–2	Egypt

The Green Hall, Dammam

26 June 2022
20:30

Iraq	2–1	Kuwait

The Green Hall, Dammam

=== Final ===
28 June 2022
16:00

Morocco	3–0	Iraq

The Green Hall, Dammam

== Honors ==
2022 Arab Futsal Cup

Morocco
Second title

- Best Player: Soufiane El Mesrar - Morocco
- Best Goalkeeper: Zaher Hadi - Iraq
- Top Goal Scorer: Abdulrahman Al Taweel (9) - Kuwait
- Fair Play Award: Egypt

== Tournament ranking ==
Per statistical convention in football, matches decided in extra time are counted as wins and losses, while matches decided by penalty shoot-out are counted as draws.

Pos	Team	Pld	W	D	L	GF	GA	GD	Pts	Final result
1	Morocco	6	6	0	0	46	6	40	18	Champions
2	Iraq	5	3	1	1	11	11	0	10	Runners-up
3	Kuwait	5	2	1	2	25	16	+9	7	Third place
4	Egypt	4	2	1	1	10	10	0	7	Fourth place
5	Palestine	3	1	1	1	10	10	0	4	Eliminated in Quarter-finals
6	Saudi Arabia	3	1	1	1	11	12	-1	4	Eliminated in Quarter-finals
7	Libya	3	1	0	2	5	8	-3	3	Eliminated in Quarter-finals
8	Mauritania	4	1	0	3	12	24	-12	3	Eliminated in Quarter-finals
9	Algeria	2	0	0	2	2	5	-3	0	Eliminated in Group stage
10	Somalia	3	0	0	3	3	33	-30	0	Eliminated in Group stage
