= 2010 Mediterranean Futsal Cup =

Tournament details
- Host country: Libya
- Dates: 1 November - 10 November
- Teams: 16 (from 3 confederations)
- Venues: 2 (in 1 host city)

Final positions
- Champions: Croatia (1st title)
- Runners-up: Libya
- Third place: Slovenia
- Fourth place: France

Tournament statistics
- Matches played: 48
- Goals scored: 372 (7.75 per match)
- Top scorer: (Syria) Mohamad Estanbolli (17)
- Best player: (Croatia) Dario Marinovic

The Mediterranean Futsal Cup was an international futsal competition, this was the first edition of the competition.

== Participating ==
The following 16 teams, shown with final pre-tournament rankings.

AFC (3)

- Lebanon
- Palestine
- Syria

CAF (4)

- Algeria
- Libya
- Morocco
- Tunisia

UEFA (9)

- Albania
- Bosnia and Herzegovina
- Croatia
- Cyprus
- France
- Greece
- Malta
- Slovenia
- Turkey

=== Draw pots ===
- Pot 1

Libya (19)
Slovenia (20)
Croatia (22)
Bosnia and Herzegovina (27)

- Pot 2

Greece (54)
France (55)
Cyprus (69)
Turkey (55)

- Pot 3

Malta (93)
Albania (82)
Palestine (61)
Syria (90)

- Pot 4

Morocco (37)
Algeria (80)
Tunisia (76)
Lebanon (41)

== First round ==
=== Group A ===
Team	Pld	W	D	L	GF	GA	GD	Pts
Libya	3	3	0	0	26	7	+19	9
Morocco	3	1	1	1	14	9	+5	4
Greece	3	1	1	1	6	7	−1	4
Syria	3	0	0	3	6	29	−23	0

2010-11-01
20:30

Libya	16 - 2 (8 - 0)	Syria

23 September
2010-11-02
20:00

Greece	1 - 1 (0 - 1)	Morocco

African Union
2010-11-03
20:00

Libya	7 - 4 (3 - 2)	Morocco

23 September
2010-11-03
20:00

Greece	4 - 3 (2 - 2)	Syria

African Union
2010-11-05
20:00

Greece	1 - 3 (1 - 3)	Libya

23 September
2010-11-05
20:00

Morocco	9 - 1 (6 - 0)	Syria

African Union

=== Group B ===
Team	Pld	W	D	L	GF	GA	GD	Pts
Slovenia	3	3	0	0	19	2	+17	9
France	3	2	0	1	10	5	+5	6
Algeria	3	1	0	2	7	17	−10	3
Albania	3	0	0	3	4	16	−12	0

2010-11-02
17:00

Slovenia	5 - 0 (3 - 0)	Albania

23 September
2010-11-02
17:00

France	4 - 0 (3 - 0)	Algeria

African Union
2010-11-03
17:00

Slovenia	11 - 1 (5 - 0)	Algeria

23 September
2010-11-03
17:00

France	5 - 2 (1 - 1)	Albania

African Union
2010-11-05
17:00

France	1 - 3 (1 - 3)	Slovenia

23 September
2010-11-05
17:00

Algeria	6 - 2 (2 - 1)	Albania

African Union

=== Group C ===
Team	Pld	W	D	L	GF	GA	GD	Pts
Tunisia	3	3	0	0	17	7	+10	9
Bosnia and Herzegovina	3	2	0	1	17	9	+8	6
Cyprus	3	1	0	2	8	11	−3	3
Malta	3	0	0	3	2	17	−15	0

2010-11-02
14:00

Bosnia and Herzegovina	8 - 1 (2 - 1)	Malta

23 September
2010-11-02
14:00

Cyprus	1 - 7 (0 - 4)	Tunisia

African Union
2010-11-03
14:00

Bosnia and Herzegovina	5 - 6 (1 - 2)	Tunisia

23 September
2010-11-03
14:00

Cyprus	5 - 0 (2 - 0)	Malta

African Union
2010-11-05
14:00

Cyprus	2 - 4 (0 - 2)	Bosnia and Herzegovina

23 September
2010-11-05
14:00

Tunisia	4 - 1 (1 - 0 )	Malta

African Union

=== Group D ===
Team	Pld	W	D	L	GF	GA	GD	Pts
Croatia	3	3	0	0	16	4	+12	9
Lebanon	3	2	0	1	16	8	+8	6
Turkey	3	1	0	2	10	10	0	3
Palestine	3	0	0	3	5	25	−20	0

2010-11-02
11:00

Croatia	8 - 1 (4 - 1)	Palestine

23 September
2010-11-02
11:00

Turkey	2 - 4 (0 - 2)	Lebanon

African Union
2010-11-03
11:00

Croatia	5 - 1 (2 - 1)	Lebanon

23 September
2010-11-03
11:00

Turkey	6 - 3 (1 - 1)	Palestine

African Union
2010-11-05
11:00

Turkey	2 - 3 (0 - 1)	Croatia

23 September
2010-11-05
11:00

Lebanon	11 - 1 (6 - 1)	Palestine

African Union

== Final round ==
=== Classification 9th–16th ===
Quarter finals
November 6
Algeria	2
Malta	1
November 6
Turkey	14
Syria	9
November 6
Greece	3
Palestine	2
November 6
Cyprus	3
Albania	4

Semifinals
November 8
Algeria	4
Turkey	5
November 8
Greece	2
Albania	1

9th place
November 9
Turkey (pen.)	3 (8)
Greece	3 (7)
11th place
November 9
Algeria	1
Albania	3

Semifinals
November 8
Malta	6
Syria	17
November 8
Palestine	3 (1)
Cyprus (pen.)	3 (3)

13th place
November 9
Syria (pen.)	6 (3)
Cyprus	6 (2)
15th place
November 9
Malta	3
Palestine	1

=== Classification 1st–8th ===
Quarter finals
November 7
Slovenia	6
Bosnia and Herzegovina	1
November 7
Croatia	5
Morocco	1
November 7
Libya	3
Lebanon	2
November 7
Tunisia	1
France	5

Semifinals
November 8
Slovenia	3
Croatia	7
November 8
Libya	2
France	1

Final
November 10
Croatia (pen.)	1 (2)
Libya	1 (0)
3rd place
November 10
Slovenia	4
France	2

Semifinals
November 8
Bosnia and Herzegovina	3
Morocco	5
November 8
Lebanon (pen.)	2 (4)
Tunisia	2 (2)

5th place
November 10
Morocco	6
Lebanon	2
7th place
November 10
Bosnia and Herzegovina	5
Tunisia	2

=== Matches ===
==== Quarter finals ====
===== 9th-16th =====
2010-11-06
17:00

Algeria	2 - 1 (2 - 1)	Malta

African Union
2010-11-06
17:00

Greece	3 - 2 (2 - 0)	Palestine

23 September
2010-11-06
20:00

Cyprus	3 - 4 (3 - 0)	Albania

African Union
2010-11-06
20:00

Turkey	14 - 9 (8 - 2)	Syria

23 September

===== 1st–8th =====
2010-11-07
11:00

Slovenia	6 - 1 (2 - 0)	Bosnia and Herzegovina

23 September
2010-11-07
14:00

Tunisia	1 - 5 (0 - 0)	France

23 September
2010-11-07
17:00

Croatia	5 - 1 (3 - 1)	Morocco

23 September
2010-11-07
20:00

Libya	3 - 2 (2 - 1)	Lebanon

23 September

==== Semifinals ====
===== 13th-16th =====
2010-11-08
11:00

Syria	17 - 6 (8 - 1)	Malta

African Union
2010-11-08
14:00

Palestine	3 - 3 (1 - 0)	Cyprus
Penalties
	1 – 3

African Union

===== 9th-12th =====
2010-11-08
11:00

Turkey	5 - 4 (4 - 0)	Algeria

23 September
2010-11-08
14:00

Greece	2 - 1 (2 - 1)	Albania

23 September

===== 5th-8th =====
2010-11-08
17:00

Morocco	5 - 3 (1 - 1)	Bosnia and Herzegovina

African Union
2010-11-08
20:00

Lebanon	2 - 2 (2 - 2)	Tunisia
Penalties
	4 – 2

African Union

===== 1st-4th =====
2010-11-08
17:00

Croatia	7 - 3 (2 - 2)	Slovenia

23 September
2010-11-08
20:00

Libya	2 - 1 (0 - 1)	France

23 September

==== Finals ====
===== 15th-16th =====
2010-11-09
11:00

Malta	3 - 1 (1 - 0)	Palestine

23 September

===== 13th-14th =====
2010-11-09
14:00

Syria	6 - 6 (4 - 4)	Cyprus
Penalties
	3 – 2

23 September

===== 11th-12th =====
2010-11-09
20:00

Algeria	1 - 3 (1 - 2)	Albania

23 September

===== 9th-10th =====
2010-11-09
17:00

Turkey	3 - 3 (2 - 1)	Greece
Penalties
	8 – 7

23 September

===== 7th-8th =====
2010-11-10
11:00

Bosnia and Herzegovina	5 - 2 (4 - 2)	Tunisia

23 September

===== 5th-6th =====
2010-11-10
14:00

Morocco	6 - 2 (2 - 0)	Lebanon

23 September

===== 3rd-4th =====
2010-11-10
17:00

Slovenia	4 - 2 (0 - 0)	France

23 September

==== Final ====
2010-11-10
20:00

Croatia	1 - 1 (0 - 1)	Libya
Penalties
	2 – 0

23 September

== Honors ==
2010 Mediterranean Futsal Cup

Croatia
1st title

- Topscorer: (Syria) Mohamad Estanbolli (17 goals)
- Best Goalkeeper: (Libya) Mohammed Al-Sharif
- Best Player: (Croatia) Dario Marinovic
- Fair-Play Award: Algeria

== Final standing ==
Pos	R.	Team	Pld	W	D	L	GF	GA	GD	Pts
1st place, gold medalist(s)	20	Croatia	6	5	1	0	29	9	+20	16
2nd place, silver medalist(s)	18	Libya	6	5	1	0	32	11	+21	16
3rd place, bronze medalist(s)	19	Slovenia	6	5	0	1	32	12	+20	15
4	54	France	6	3	0	3	18	12	+6	9
5	37	Morocco	6	3	1	2	26	19	+7	10
6	41	Lebanon	6	2	1	3	22	19	+3	7
7	27	Bosnia and Herzegovina	6	3	0	3	26	22	+4	9
8	76	Tunisia	6	3	1	2	22	19	+3	10
9	55	Turkey	6	3	1	2	32	26	+6	10
10	54	Greece	6	3	2	1	14	13	+1	11
11	82	Albania	6	2	0	4	12	22	−10	6
12	80	Algeria	6	2	0	4	14	29	−15	6
13	90	Syria	6	1	1	4	38	55	−17	4
14	69	Cyprus	6	1	2	3	20	24	−4	5
15	93	Malta	6	1	0	5	12	37	−25	3
16	61	Palestine	6	0	1	5	11	34	−23	1

== See also ==
- Futsal planet
