= 2010 North African Futsal Tournament =

Tournament details
- Host country: Libya
- Dates: September 20 - September 26
- Teams: 5 (from 2 confederations)
- Venue: 1 (in 1 host city)

Final positions
- Champions: Libya (3rd title)
- Runners-up: Morocco
- Third place: Tunisia
- Fourth place: Palestine

Tournament statistics
- Matches played: 10
- Goals scored: 88 (8.8 per match)

The 2010 North African Futsal Cup was the 3rd Championship and it took place in Misrata, Libya from September 20-26, 2010, Organised by the Union of North African Football Federations. Palestine was invited after the withdrawal of Egypt.

== Group stage ==
Team	Pld	W	D	L	GF	GA	GD	Pts
Libya	4	4	0	0	34	6	+28	12
Morocco	4	3	0	1	21	5	+16	9
Tunisia	4	2	0	2	11	16	−5	6
Palestine	4	1	0	3	16	26	−10	3
Algeria	4	0	0	4	5	34	−29	0

== Matches ==
Date	Time	Team 1	Score (HT Score)	Team 2
20 September	22:00	Libya	12 – 0 (8–0)	Palestine
21 September	18:00	Morocco	7 – 0 (4–0)	Algeria
21 September	20:15	Libya	6 – 1 (2–0)	Tunisia
23 September	18:00	Morocco	7 – 1 (3–1)	Palestine
23 September	20:15	Tunisia	4 – 2 (3–0)	Algeria
24 September	18:00	Tunisia	6 – 4 (6–3)	Palestine
24 September	20:15	Libya	12 – 2 (5–1)	Algeria
25 September	18:00	Algeria	1 – 11 (1–5)	Palestine
25 September	20:15	Morocco	4 – 0 (2–0)	Tunisia
26 September	20:15	Libya	4 – 3 (2–1)	Morocco

== Honors ==
2010 North African Futsal Cup

Libya
3rd title

- Best player: (Libya) Rabie Hoty
- Best goalkeeper: (Libya) Mohamed Sharif
- Best scorer: (Libya) Hamdi Shwein

== See also ==
- Futsal Planet
