= Arab Futsal Cup =

- Organiser(s): UAFA
- Founded: 1998
- Region: Arab world (UAFA)
- Teams: 10
- Current champions: Morocco (2023)
- Most championships: Morocco (3 titles)
- 2023 Arab Futsal Cup

The Arab Futsal Cup (Arabic: كأس العرب لكرة الصالات) is a futsal competition for Arab nations. It was first held in 1998. Only three teams have won the cup since its foundation. Morocco is the most successful having won the title three times, followed by Egypt and Libya with two titles each.

Three countries have hosted the Arab Cup. Egypt have hosted it four times, Saudi Arabia twice, while Libya hosted it.

As of the last edition, Morocco are the current champions having defeated Kuwait 7-1 in the final.

== History ==
The competition started in 1998 under the name of Arab Futsal Championship. From the 2021 edition, it was renamed to Arab Futsal Cup.

The first two editions of the futsal cup was won by Egypt, after defeating Morocco twice in the final, becoming the first nation to win back-to-back titles.

The third and forth edition of the Arab Futsal Cup was won by Libya, thus becoming the second nation to win back-to-back titles.

=== Moroccan domination ===
On 29 May 2021, Morocco won their first Arab Cup in 2021 after defeating Egypt 4-0 in the final.

The sixth edition witnessed the participation of 10 countries, Morocco went on to win the cup, claiming their second Arab Cup title after defeating Iraq 3-0, becoming the third nation after Egypt and Libya to win back-to-back titles.

On 16 June 2023, Morocco became the first nation to win the cup three consecutive times, after defeating Kuwait 7-1 in the final.

== Results ==
Ed.	Year	Host	First place game			Third place game		
Ed.	Year	Host	(gold) Champion	Score	(silver) Runner-up	(bronze) Third place	Score	Fourth place
1	1998	Egypt	Egypt	8–4	Morocco	Libya	6–2	Palestine
2	2005	Egypt	Egypt	5–1	Morocco	Lebanon	8–5	Libya
3	2007	Libya	Libya	2–0^{n/a}	Egypt	Lebanon	8–3^{n/a}	Morocco
4	2008	Egypt	Libya	3–2	Egypt	Jordan	4–1	Lebanon
5	2021	Egypt	Morocco	4–0	Egypt	Bahrain and United Arab Emirates		
6	2022	Saudi Arabia	Morocco	3–0	Iraq	Egypt and Kuwait		
7	2023	Saudi Arabia	Morocco	7–1	Kuwait	Algeria and Libya		

^n/a A round-robin tournament determined the final standings.

== Ranking ==
Team	Champion	Runner-up	Third	Semi-finalists	Fourth	Top 4
Morocco	3 (2021, 2022, 2023)	2 (1998, 2005)			1 (2007)	6
Egypt	2 (1998, 2005)	3 (2007, 2008, 2021)		1 (2022)		6
Libya	2 (2007, 2008)		1 (1998)	1 (2023)	1 (2005)	5
Kuwait		1 (2023)		1 (2022)		2
Iraq		1 (2022)				1
Lebanon			2 (2005, 2007)		1 (2008)	3
Jordan			1 (2008)			1
Bahrain				1 (2021)		1
United Arab Emirates				1 (2021)		1
Algeria				1 (2023)		1
Palestine					1 (1998)	1

== Summary (1998-2023) ==
Rank	Team	Part	M	W	D	L	GF	GA	GD	Points
1	Morocco	6	32	27	0	5	176	66	+110	81
2	Egypt	7	32	24	3	5	165	73	+92	75
3	Libya	6	29	19	1	9	137	92	+45	58
4	Lebanon	4	19	8	0	11	93	87	+6	24
5	Iraq	4	16	7	3	6	50	53	-3	24
6	Kuwait	3	14	7	2	5	61	43	+18	23
7	Algeria	6	22	4	3	15	64	102	-38	15
8	Palestine	3	11	4	2	6	38	46	-8	14
9	Jordan	2	8	4	0	4	42	32	+10	12
10	Saudi Arabia	3	10	3	2	5	35	41	-6	11
11	United Arab Emirates	1	4	2	0	2	13	13	0	6
12	Bahrain	1	4	2	0	2	9	11	-2	6
13	Tunisia	3	10	2	0	8	31	62	-31	6
14	Sudan	1	3	1	0	2	8	21	-13	3
15	Mauritania	3	10	1	0	10	23	64	-41	3
16	Tajikistan	1	3	0	1	2	3	12	-9	1
17	Syria	1	3	0	0	3	7	22	-15	0
18	Comoros	2	6	0	0	6	8	28	-20	0
19	Yemen	1	4	0	0	4	5	46	-41	0
20	Somalia	2	3	0	0	6	4	52	-48	0

– Record

== Awards ==
Year	Top goalscorer(s)	Gls	Best player	Best goalkeeper	Fair play team	Ref.
(Libya) 2007	(Libya) Abdul-Wahed Mohammed (Lebanon) Hithem Atwe	8	(Morocco) Morad Bokare	(Libya) Mohammed Al-Sharif	Tunisia	
(Egypt) 2008	(Lebanon) Khaled Takaji	13	(Libya) Rabie El-Hoti	(Libya) Mohammed Al-Sharif		
(Egypt) 2021	(Morocco) Achraf Saoud	7	(Morocco) Anás El-Ayyane	(Morocco) Reda Khiyari		
(Saudi Arabia) 2022	(Kuwait) Abdulrahman Al Taweel	9	(Morocco) Soufiane El Mesrar	(Iraq) Zaher Hadi	Egypt	
(Saudi Arabia) 2023	(Kuwait) Abduellteif AlAbasi	7	(Morocco) Anás El-Ayyane	(Algeria) Samir Teffaf		

== Participating nations ==
Team	(Egypt) 1998	(Egypt) 2005	(Libya) 2007	(Egypt) 2008	(Egypt) 2021	(Saudi Arabia) 2022	(Saudi Arabia) 2023	Years
Algeria	GS	GS	GS	GS		GS	SF	6
Bahrain					SF			1
Comoros					GS		GS	2
Egypt	1st	1st	2nd	2nd	2nd	SF	QF	7
Iraq		GS		GS		2nd	QF	4
Jordan	GS			3rd				2
Kuwait					GS	SF	2nd	3
Lebanon		3rd	3rd	4th			QF	4
Libya	3rd	4th	1st	1st		QF	SF	6
Mauritania					GS	QF	GS	3
Morocco	2nd	2nd	4th		1st	1st	1st	6
Palestine	4th					QF	GS	3
Saudi Arabia					GS	QF	QF	3
Somalia	GS					GS		2
Sudan	GS							1
Syria				GS				1
Tajikistan							GS	1
Tunisia		GS	GS	GS				3
United Arab Emirates					SF			1
Yemen				GS				1
Total	8	7	6	9	8	10	12	

Legend

- 1st – Champions
- 2nd – Runner-up
- 3rd – Third place
- 4th – Fourth place
- SF – Semi-final (no third place match)
- QF – Quarter-final
- GS – Group stage
- Q – Qualified for upcoming tournament
- – Hosts
