= 2009 WAFF Futsal Championship =

Tournament details
- Host country: Jordan
- Dates: 31 August – 5 September
- Teams: 5
- Venue: 1 (in 1 host city)

Final positions
- Champions: Iraq (1st title)
- Runners-up: Jordan
- Third place: Lebanon
- Fourth place: Bahrain

Tournament statistics
- Matches played: 10
- Goals scored: 68 (6.8 per match)

The 2009 West Asian Futsal Federation Championship was held from to in Amman, Jordan. Iraq won the tournament.

== Final standings ==
Team	Pts	Pld	W	D	L	GF	GA	GD
Iraq	10	4	3	1	0	10	7	+3
Jordan	7	4	2	1	1	20	9	+11
Lebanon	6	4	2	0	2	11	8	+3
Bahrain	6	4	2	0	2	19	24	−5
Syria	0	4	0	0	4	8	20	−12

== Matches and results ==
31 August 2009

Iraq	2–1	Lebanon

31 August 2009

Jordan	4–1	Syria

1 September 2009

Iraq	3–2	Syria

1 September 2009

Lebanon	2–4	Bahrain

2 September 2009

Bahrain	5–14	Jordan

2 September 2009

Syria	1–6	Lebanon

4 September 2009

Syria	4–7	Bahrain

4 September 2009

Iraq	1–1	Jordan

5 September 2009

Bahrain	3–4	Iraq

5 September 2009

Jordan	1–2	Lebanon

== Awards ==
2009 WAFF Futsal Championship winners

Iraq
First title

- Most Valuable Player
- Top Scorer
- Fair-Play Award

== See also ==
- West Asian Futsal Championship
