= 2009 North African Futsal Tournament =

Tournament details
- Host country: Tunisia
- Dates: August 10 - August 20
- Teams: 4 (from 2 confederations)
- Venue: 1 (in 1 host city)

Final positions
- Champions: Libya (2nd title)
- Runners-up: Egypt
- Third place: Tunisia
- Fourth place: Syria

Tournament statistics
- Matches played: 6
- Goals scored: 58 (9.67 per match)

The 2009 North African Futsal Cup was the 2nd Championship and it took place in Tunis, Tunisia from August 10–20, 2009, Organised by the Union of North African Football Federations. Syria were invited after the withdrawal of Algeria and Morocco.

== Group stage ==
Team	Pld	W	D	L	GF	GA	GD	Pts
Libya	3	3	0	0	20	3	+17	9
Egypt	3	2	0	1	23	7	+16	6
Tunisia	3	1	0	2	11	10	+1	3
Syria	3	0	0	3	4	38	−34	0

== Matches ==
Date	Time	Team 1	Score (HT Score)	Team 2
12 August 2009	19:00	Libya	4 - 2 (2-1)	Egypt
14 August 2009	19:00	Libya	11 - 1 (3-0)	Syria
14 August 2009	20:30	Tunisia	0 - 5 (0-1)	Egypt
15 August 2009	19:00	Tunisia	11 - 0 (4-0)	Syria
16 August 2009	19:00	Egypt	16-3 (9-1)	Syria
16 August 2009	20:30	Tunisia	0-5 (0-3)	Libya

== Honors ==
2009 North African Futsal Cup

Libya
2nd title

== See also ==
- Futsal Planet
