= Jordan national futsal team =

Jordan
- Nickname(s): النشامى; Al-Nashāmā ("The Chivalrous")
- Association: Jordan Football Association
- Confederation: AFC (Asia)
- Head coach: Saleh Abu Jafer
- FIFA code: JOR
- FIFA ranking: NR (8 May 2026)
Home colours	Away colours

First international
- Belarus 5 – 0 Jordan (Abu Dhabi, UAE, 13 February 1995)

Biggest win
- Jordan 14 – 5 Bahrain (Amman, Jordan, 2 September 2009)

Biggest defeat
- Iran 12 – 1 Jordan (Tehran, Iran, 16 October 2007)

AFC Futsal Championship
- Appearances: 2 (First in 2016)
- Best result: Group stage (2016, 2018)

Asian Indoor and Martial Arts Games
- Appearances: 2 (First in 2009)
- Best result: Quarterfinals (2009, 2017)

The Jordan national futsal team is controlled by the Jordan Football Association, the governing body for futsal in Jordan and represents the country in international futsal competitions.

== Tournaments ==
=== FIFA Futsal World Cup ===
FIFA Futsal World Cup Record
Year	Round	Pld	W	D	L	GS	GA
(Netherlands) 1989	Did not enter						
(Hong Kong) 1992	Did not enter						
(Spain) 1996	Did not enter						
(Guatemala) 2000	Did not enter						
(Taiwan) 2004	Did not enter						
(Brazil) 2008	Did not enter						
(Thailand) 2012	Did not enter						
(Colombia) 2016	Did not enter						
(Lithuania) 2020	Did not enter						
(Uzbekistan) 2024	Did not enter						
Total	0/10	0	0	0	0	0	0

=== AFC Futsal Championship ===
AFC Futsal Asian Cup record
Year	Round	Pld	W	D	L	GS	GA
(Malaysia) 1999	Did not enter						
(Thailand) 2000	Did not enter						
(Iran) 2001	Did not enter						
(Indonesia) 2002	Did not enter						
(Iran) 2003	Did not enter						
(Macau) 2004	Did not enter						
(Vietnam) 2005	Did not enter						
(Uzbekistan) 2006	Did not enter						
(Japan) 2007	Did not enter						
(Thailand) 2008	Did not enter						
(Uzbekistan) 2010	Did not qualify						
(United Arab Emirates) 2012	Did not enter						
(Vietnam) 2014	Did not enter						
(Uzbekistan) 2016	Group stage	3	0	0	3	4	15
(Taiwan) 2018	Group stage	3	0	0	3	3	10
(Kuwait) 2022	Did not qualify						
(Thailand) 2024	Did not qualify						
(Indonesia) 2026	Did not qualify						
Total	2/18	6	0	0	6	7	25

=== Futsal at the Asian Indoor and Martial Arts Games ===
Asian Indoor and Martial Arts Games record
Year	Round	Pld	W	D	L	GS	GA
(Thailand) 2005	Did not Enter						
(Macau) 2007	Did not Enter						
(Vietnam) 2009	Quarterfinals	4	3	0	1	17	10
(South Korea) 2013	Did not Enter						
(Turkmenistan) 2017	Quarterfinals	4	2	0	2	14	12
Total	2/5	8	5	0	3	31	22

=== WAFF Futsal Championship ===
West Asian Championship record
Year	Round	Pld	W	D	L	GS	GA
(Iran) 2007	Fourth Place	3	0	1	2	6	21
(Jordan) 2009	Runners-up	4	2	1	1	20	9
(Iran) 2012	Runners-up	4	2	0	2	19	23
Total	3/3	11	4	2	5	45	43

=== Arab Futsal Championship ===
Arab Futsal Championship record
Year	Round	Pld	W	D	L	GS	GA
(Egypt) 1998	Group stage	3	1	0	2	24	19
(Egypt) 2005	Did not Enter						
(Libya) 2007	Did not Enter						
(Egypt) 2008	Third Place	5	3	0	2	18	13
Total	2/4	8	4	0	4	42	32

== Players ==
=== Current squad ===
Players called for the 2018 AFC Futsal Championship.

No.	Pos.	Player	Date of birth (age)	Club
1	GK	Yusef Ayasrah	31 December 1987 (age 38)	(Jordan Football Association) Shocair
12	GK	Aledres Hasan		
14	GK	Majed Al-Hafi	26 June 1983 (age 43)	(Jordan Football Association) Hamadah
2	FP	Majdi Qandeel	20 August 1986 (age 39)	
3	FP	Qais Shabib	8 September 1996 (age 29)	(Jordan Football Association) Shocair
4	FP	Mutaz Mohammad		
5	FP	Abdel Samara	14 August 1992 (age 33)	(Jordan Football Association) Rusefa
6	FP	Musa Abu Shaikha	3 September 1994 (age 31)	
7	FP	Ahmed Arab	18 December 1980 (age 45)	(Jordan Football Association) Amman Municipality
8	FP	Yousef Al-Awadat	8 December 1989 (age 36)	
9	FP	Ibrahim Qandeel	2 January 1987 (age 39)	
10	FP	Samer Naser	26 January 1990 (age 36)	(Chinese Football Association) Wuhan Dilong
11	FP	Amjed Al-Qorom	18 September 1988 (age 37)	(Jordan Football Association) Shabab Al-Ordon
13	FP	Waleed Abed Ashour		

=== Previous squads ===
AFC Futsal Championship

- 2018 AFC Futsal Championship squads
