= Mediterranean Futsal Cup =

International futsal tournament

The Mediterranean Futsal Cup was an international futsal tournament for national teams from the countries in the Mediterranean Region.

== Results ==
Year	Hosts	Final			Third place match
Year	Hosts	Champions	Score	Runners-up	Third Place	Score	Fourth Place
2010; Details	(Libya) Tripoli	Croatia	3–1	Libya	Slovenia	4–2	France

== Ranking ==
Rank	Team	Champions	Runners-up	Third Place	Fourth Place
1	Croatia	1 (2010)			
2	Libya		1 (2010)		
3	Slovenia			1 (2010)	
4	France				1 (2010)
