= Iraq national futsal team =

Iraq
- Shirt badge/Association crest
- Nickname(s): Usood al-Rafidayn (Lions of Mesopotamia)
- Association: Iraq Football Association
- Confederation: AFC (Asia)
- Head coach: (Brazil) Ricardo Cámara
- Captain: Utayl Khaleel Abdulqader
- FIFA code: IRQ
- FIFA ranking: 23 ▲1 (24 September 2026)
Home colours	Away colours	Third colours

First international
- South Korea 3 – 1 Iraq (Tehran, Iran; 14 July 2001)

Biggest win
- Iraq 19 – 0 Guam (Taipei, Taiwan; 1 March 2007); Iraq 20 – 1 Brunei (Jakarta, Indonesia; 24 October 2002)

Biggest defeat
- Iran 13 – 2 Iraq (Tashkent, Uzbekistan; 14 February 2016)

AFC Futsal Championship
- Appearances: 12 (First in 2001)
- Best result: Fourth place (2018, 2026)

WAFF Futsal Championship
- Appearances: 3 (First in 2007)
- Best result: (gold) Champions (2009)

The Iraq national futsal team represents Iraq in international futsal competitions and is controlled by the Futsal Commission of the Iraq Football Association. It is one of the rising teams in Asia. As of October 2023, Iraq is ranked 43rd in the Futsal World Rankings. Iraq has played in eleven AFC Futsal Championships. Its best result was fourth place in 2018. Iraq has also played at three WAFF Futsal Championships where in 2009, they won the tournament to gain their first ever title on any international stage. Iraq also played three times at the Arab Futsal Cup, finishing as runners-up in the 2022 edition.

== History ==
On 28 June 2022, Iraq lost the 2022 Arab Futsal Cup against Morocco.

== Team image ==
=== Home stadium ===
Iraq plays the home games at the Baghdad Gymnasium with a capacity of 3,000 spectators. The complex was designed by the Swiss-French architect Charles-Édouard Jeanneret, commonly known as Le Corbusier.

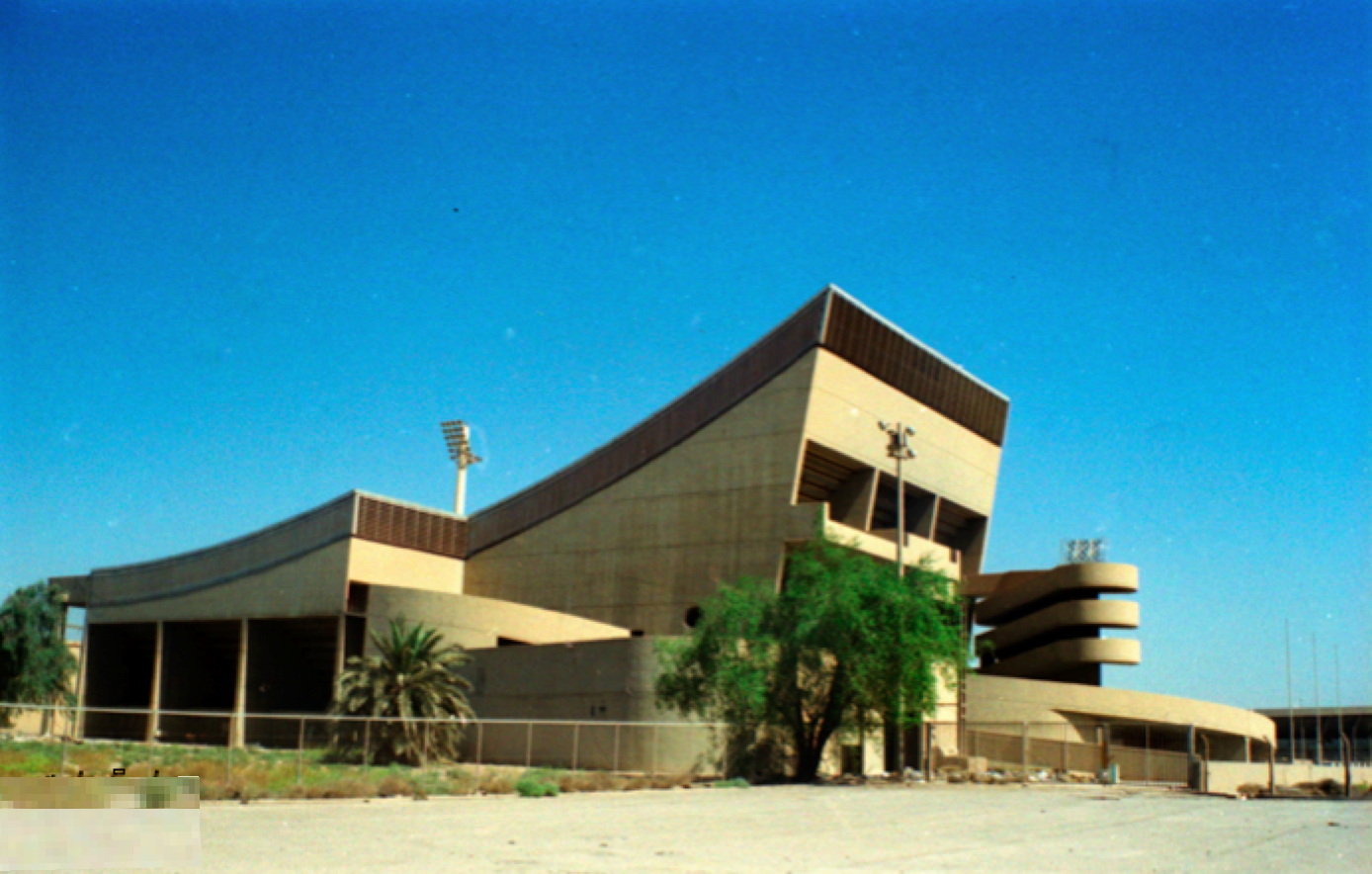
A view of Baghdad Gymnasium

== Recent results and fixtures ==
=== Previous matches ===
Win Draw Lose

== Coaching staff ==
As of 20 April 2024

Head coach	(Brazil) Ricardo Cámara Sobral (Cacau)
Assistant coaches	
Goalkeeping coach	
Translator	
Team doctors	
Equipment manager	
Team managers	

== Players ==
=== Current squad ===
Players called for the 2022 AFC Futsal Asian Cup.

No.	Pos.	Player	Date of birth (age)	Club
1	GK	Mohamed Sami		
2	GK	Ahmed Duraid		
3	FP	Ali Shihab		
4	FP	Fahad Methaq		
5	FP	Mustafa Ihsan		
6	FP	Mohanad Abdulhadi		
7	FP	Salim Faisal	16 January 1995 (aged 27)	
8	FP	Ghaith Riyadh		
9	FP	Muheb Aldeen		
10	FP	Rafid Hameed		
11	FP	Haedr Majed		
12	GK	Zaher Mahdi		
13	FP	Tareq Zeyad		
14	FP	Waleed Khalid	29 June 1992 (aged 30)	

=== Previous squads ===
AFC Futsal Championship

- 2018 AFC Futsal Championship squads

== Tournament records ==
=== FIFA Futsal World Cup ===
FIFA Futsal World Cup Record
Year	Round	Position	Pld	W	D	L	GF	GA
(Netherlands) 1989	Did not enter							
(Hong Kong) 1992	Did not enter							
(Spain) 1996	Did not enter							
(Guatemala) 2000	Did not enter							
(Taiwan) 2004	Did not qualify							
(Brazil) 2008	Did not qualify							
(Thailand) 2012	Did not qualify							
(Colombia) 2016	Did not qualify							
(Lithuania) 2020	Did not qualify							
(Uzbekistan) 2024	Did not qualify							
Total	0/10	Best:	0	0	0	0	0	0

=== AFC Futsal Asian Cup ===
AFC Futsal Asian Cup										Qualification							
Year	Round	Rank	M	W	D	L	GF	GA	GD	M	W	D	L	GF	GA	GD	Link
(Malaysia) 1999	Did not enter									No qualification							
(Thailand) 2000	Did not enter									No qualification							
(Iran) 2001	Group stage	16th	3	0	1	2	8	16	-8	No qualification							
(Indonesia) 2002	Quarter-finals	8th	5	2	0	3	37	18	+19	No qualification							
(Iran) 2003	Group stage	16th	3	1	0	2	12	10	+2	No qualification							
(Macau) 2004	Did not enter									No qualification							
(Vietnam) 2005	Group stage	16th	8	6	0	2	33	19	+14	No qualification							
(Uzbekistan) 2006	Group stage	16th	3	0	0	3	4	12	-8	Automatically qualified							Link
(Japan) 2007	Group stage	16th	3	1	0	2	9	13	-4	3	3	0	0	34	7	+27	Link
(Thailand) 2008	Group stage	16th	3	0	0	3	4	14	-10	Automatically qualified							Link
(Uzbekistan) 2010	Group stage	16th	3	1	0	2	12	20	-8	4	2	0	2	12	7	+5	Link
(United Arab Emirates) 2012	Did not qualify									5	2	2	1	11	6	+5	Link
(Vietnam) 2014	Group stage	16th	3	2	0	1	11	7	+4	4	1	2	1	8	8	0	Link
(Uzbekistan) 2016	Quarter-finals	8th	5	2	0	3	15	25	-10	2	1	0	1	4	3	+1	Link
(Chinese Taipei) 2018	Fourth place	4th	6	2	2	2	16	18	-2	3	1	1	1	9	8	+1	Link
(Turkmenistan) 2020	Cancelled									4	2	0	2	11	11	0	Link
(Kuwait) 2022	Group stage	10th	3	1	1	1	9	5	+4	2	1	1	0	3	1	+2	Link
(Thailand) 2024	Quarter-finals	8th	5	2	0	3	17	15	+2	3	2	0	1	10	4	+6	Link
2026	Semi-finals	4th	5	3	1	1	14	11	+3	3	3	0	0	14	2	+12	Link
Total:14/18	Fourth place	4th	58	23	5	30	201	203	−2	33	18	6	9	116	56	+60	–

=== Asian Indoor Games ===
Asian Indoor and Martial Arts Games record
Year	Round	Pld	W	D	L	GS	GA
(Thailand) 2005	did not enter						
(Macau) 2007	did not enter						
(Vietnam) 2009	did not enter						
(South Korea) 2013	Group stage	2	0	0	2	5	15
(Turkmenistan) 2017	did not enter						
(Saudi Arabia) 2026	TBD						
Total	1/5	2	2	0	0	5	15

=== WAFF Futsal Championship ===
West Asian Championship record
Year	Round	Pld	W	D	L	GS	GA
(Iran) 2007	Third Place	3	0	1	2	7	12
(Jordan) 2009	Champions	4	3	1	0	10	7
(Iran) 2012	Third Place	4	2	0	2	19	23
(Kuwait) 2022	Group Stage	3	1	1	1	10	9
Total	4/4	14	6	3	5	46	51

=== Arab Futsal Championship ===
Arab Futsal Championship record
Year	Round	Pld	W	D*	L	GS	GA
(Egypt) 1998	did not enter						
(Egypt) 2005	Group stage	3	1	0	2	9	19
(Libya) 2007	did not enter						
(Egypt) 2008	Group stage	4	2	0	2	17	17
(Egypt) 2021	did not enter						
(Saudi Arabia) 2022	Runners-up	5	3	1	1	11	11
Total	3/6	12	6	1	5	37	47

== See also ==
- Iraq national football team
- Iraq national beach soccer team

Preceded by 2007 Iran	WAFF Futsal Championship; 2009 (First title)	Succeeded by 2012 Iran
