= 2008 Arab Futsal Championship =

بطولة العرب لكرة القدم داخل الصالات 2008

Tournament details
- Host country: Egypt
- Dates: 23 − 29 December
- Teams: 10 (from 2 confederations)
- Venue: 1 (in 1 host city)

Final positions
- Champions: Libya (2nd title)
- Runners-up: Egypt
- Third place: Jordan
- Fourth place: Lebanon

Tournament statistics
- Matches played: 20
- Goals scored: 173 (8.65 per match)
- Top scorer(s): (Lebanon) Khaled Takaji (13 goals)
- Best player: (Libya) Rabie El-Hoti
- Best goalkeeper: (Libya) Mohammed Al-Sharif

The 2008 Arab Futsal Championship hosted by the Egyptian city of Port Said was the fourth edition of the Arab Futsal Championship between December 23 and 29, 2008. Ten teams took part, with Yemen making their futsal debut, and Syria making their competitive futsal debut after having played only 2 friendly matches. Libya successfully defended their title from the 2007 Championship.

== Qualification ==
The following nine teams qualified for the final tournament. Palestine withdrew.

Team	Appearance	Previous best performance
Algeria	4th	Group stage (1998, 2005, 2007)
Egypt (hosts)	4th	Champions (1998, 2005)
Iraq	2nd	Group stage (2005)
Jordan	2nd	Group stage (1998)
Lebanon	3rd	Third place (2005, 2007)
Libya	4th	Champions (2007)
Syria	1st	Debut
Tunisia	3rd	Group stage (2005, 2007)
Yemen	1st	Debut

Withdrew

- Palestine

== Venues ==
Cities	Venues	Capacity
Port Said	Port Said Hall	5 000

== Group stage ==
=== Group 1 ===
Pos	Team	Pld	W	D	L	GF	GA	GD	Pts	Qualification
1	Egypt	3	3	0	0	18	3	+15	9	Semi-finals
2	Jordan	3	2	0	1	14	10	+4	6	Semi-finals
3	Tunisia	3	1	0	2	7	11	−4	3	
4	Syria	3	0	0	3	7	22	−15	0	
5	Palestine (W)	0	-	-	-	-	-	—	0	

(W) Withdrew

Date	Team 1	Score	Team 2
2008-12-23	Egypt	8 - 0	Syria
2008-12-24	Jordan	3 - 1	Tunisia
2008-12-25	Syria	3 - 5	Tunisia
2008-12-26	Egypt	5 - 1	Tunisia
2008-12-26	Syria	4 - 9	Jordan
2008-12-27	Egypt	5 - 2	Jordan

=== Group 2 ===
Pos	Team	Pld	W	D	L	GF	GA	GD	Pts	Qualification
1	Libya	4	4	0	0	38	9	+29	12	Semi-finals
2	Lebanon	4	3	0	1	30	13	+17	9	Semi-finals
3	Iraq	4	2	0	2	17	17	0	6	
4	Algeria	4	1	0	3	20	25	−5	3	
5	Yemen	4	0	0	4	5	46	−41	0	

Date	Team 1	Score	Team 2
2008-12-23	Algeria	10 - 1	Yemen
2008-12-23	Iraq	1 - 7	Lebanon
2008-12-24	Iraq	3 - 6	Libya
2008-12-24	Lebanon	16 - 2	Yemen
2008-12-25	Algeria	2 - 5	Iraq
2008-12-25	Lebanon	2 - 6	Libya
2008-12-26	Algeria	4 - 5	Lebanon
2008-12-26	Libya	12 - 0	Yemen
2008-12-27	Algeria	4 - 14	Libya
2008-12-27	Iraq	8 - 2	Yemen

== Knockout stage ==
Semi-finals
28 December – Port Said
Egypt	3
Lebanon	2
28 December – Port Said
Libya	2
Jordan	0

Final
29 December – Port Said
Egypt	2
Libya	3
Third place
29 December – Port Said
Lebanon	1
Jordan	4

=== Semi-finals ===
Date	Team 1	Score	Team 2
2008-12-28	Egypt	3 - 2	Lebanon
2008-12-28	Libya	2 - 0	Jordan

=== Third place play-off ===
Date	Team 1	Score	Team 2
2008-12-29	Lebanon	1 - 4	Jordan

=== Final ===
29 December 2008

Egypt	2–3	Libya
Samy; Hasan		Rhouma; Khuja; Suleiman

Port Said Hall, Port Said
Attendance: 5,000

== Honors ==
2008 Arab Futsal Championship

Libya
2nd title

- Best Player: Rabie El-Hoti - Libya
- Best Goalkeeper: Mohammed Al-Sharif - Libya
- Top Goal Scorer: Khaled Takaji (13) - Lebanon
