= 2005 North African Futsal Tournament =

Tournament details
- Host country: Libya
- Dates: September 19 - September 26
- Teams: 3 (from 1 confederation)
- Venue: 1 (in 1 host city)

Final positions
- Champions: Libya (1st title)
- Runners-up: Morocco
- Third place: Tunisia

Tournament statistics
- Matches played: 6
- Goals scored: 58 (9.67 per match)

The 2005 North African Futsal Cup is the 1st Championship and it took place in Tripoli, Libya from September 19 - September 26, 2005.

== Group stage ==
Team	Pld	W	D	L	GF	GA	GD	Pts
Libya	4	4	0	0	24	13	+11	12
Morocco	4	2	0	2	23	8	+15	6
Tunisia	4	0	0	4	11	37	−26	0

Source: rsssf.com

== Matches ==
Date	Team 1	Score (HT Score)	Team 2
2005-09-19	Libya	12–6 (5–5)	Tunisia
2005-09-21	Morocco	1–2 (0–0)	Libya
2005-09-22	Morocco	9–1	Tunisia
2005-09-24	Morocco	10–1	Tunisia
2005-09-25	Libya	6–3 (3–2)	Tunisia
2005-09-26	Libya	4–3 (0–1)	Morocco

== Honors ==
2005 North African Futsal Cup

Libya
1st title

== See also ==
- Futsal Planet
- RSSF
