= Palestine national futsal team =

Palestine
- Shirt badge/Association crest
- Nickname(s): الفدائيون (The Fedayeen) الفرسان (The Knights) أسود كنعان (Lions of Canaan)
- Association: Palestinian Football Association
- Confederation: AFC (Asia)
- FIFA code: PLE
- FIFA ranking: 122 (24 September 2026)
Home colours	Away colours

First international
- Palestine 5–9 Egypt (Cairo, Egypt; 6 December 1998)

Biggest win
- Palestine 14–0 Guam (Ho Chi Minh City, Vietnam; 28 May 2005)

Biggest defeat
- Iran 19–1 Palestine (Urmia, Iran; 29 April 2012)

FIFA World Cup
- Appearances: None

AFC Futsal Asian Cup
- Appearances: 3 (First in 2001)
- Best result: Quarterfinals (2001)

WAFF Futsal Championship
- Appearances: 1 (First in 2012)
- Best result: 5th place (2012)

The Palestine national futsal team is controlled by the Palestinian Football Association, the governing body for futsal in Palestine and represents the country in international futsal competitions.

== Tournaments ==
=== FIFA Futsal World Cup ===
FIFA Futsal World Cup

- 1989 – Did not enter
- 1992 – Did not enter
- 1996 – Did not enter
- 2000 – Did not enter
- 2004 – Did not enter
- 2008 – Did not enter
- 2012 – Did not qualify
- 2016 – Did not enter
- 2021 – Did not qualify
- 2024 – Did not qualify

=== AFC Futsal Asian Cup ===
AFC Futsal Asian Cup record
Year	Round	Rank	Pld	W	D	L	GS	GA	GD
(Malaysia) 1999	Did not enter								
(Thailand) 2000	Did not enter								
(Iran) 2001	Quarter final		5	3	0	2	24	26	–2
(Indonesia) 2002	Did not enter								
(Iran) 2003	Group stage		3	1	0	2	16	15	+1
(Macau) 2004	Did not enter								
(Vietnam) 2005	Plate Semi-final		7	5	0	2	61	29	+32
(Uzbekistan) 2006	Did not enter								
(Japan) 2007	Did not enter								
(Thailand) 2008	Did not enter								
(Uzbekistan) 2010	Did not enter								
(United Arab Emirates) 2012	Did not enter								
(Vietnam) 2014	Did not enter								
(Uzbekistan) 2016	Did not enter								
(Taiwan) 2018	Did not enter								
(Kuwait) 2020	Did not qualify								
(Thailand) 2024	Did not qualify								
Total	3/16	–	15	9	0	6	101	70	+31

=== WAFF Futsal Championship ===
WAFF Futsal Championship record
Host nation(s) and year	Round	Pld	W	D	L	GF	GA
(Iran) 2007	did not enter						
(Jordan) 2009	did not enter						
(Iran) 2012	5th of 5	4	0	0	4	9	36
(Kuwait) 2022	Group stage	3	0	0	3	6	13
Total	2/4	7	0	0	7	15	49

=== Arab Futsal Cup ===
Arab Futsal Cup record
Host nation(s) and year	Round	Pld	W	D	L	GF	GA
(Egypt) 1998	Fourth place	5	2	0	3	20	21
(Egypt) 2005	withdrew						
(Libya) 2007	did not enter						
(Egypt) 2008	withdrew						
(Egypt) 2021	did not enter						
(Saudi Arabia) 2022	Quarter-finals	3	1	1	1	10	10
(Saudi Arabia) 2023	Group Stage	3	1	0	2	8	15
Total	3/7	10	4	1	5	38	46
