= Libya national futsal team =

Libya
- Nickname(s): Mediterranean Knights فرسان المتوسط
- Association: Libyan Football Federation
- Confederation: CAF (Africa)
- Head coach: (Spain) Ricardo Iñiguez
- Captain: Mohammed Al-Sharif
- Home stadium: Suliman Ad-Dharrath Arena
- FIFA code: LBY
- FIFA ranking: 52 ▲1 (24 September 2026)
- Highest FIFA ranking: 14 (March 2009)
- Lowest FIFA ranking: 71 (February 2004)
Home colours	Away colours

First international
- Italy 9–2 Libya (Roma, Italy; 19 July 1974)

Biggest win
- Libya 20–3 Syria (Benghazi, Libya; 29 August 2008)

Biggest defeat
- Libya 0–13 Brazil (Nakhon Ratchasima, Thailand; 4 November 2012)

FIFA World Cup
- Appearances: 3 (First in 2008)
- Best result: First round (2008, 2012, 2024)

African Futsal Championship
- Appearances: 5 (First in 2000)
- Best result: (gold) Champions (2008)

Confederations Cup
- Appearances: 1 (First in 2009)
- Best result: Third place (2009)

Grand Prix de Futsal
- Appearances: 1 (First in 2010)
- Best result: 10th place (2010)

The Libya national futsal team represents Libya in international futsal competitions and is controlled by the Libyan Football Federation. As of April 2016, Libya is ranked 31st in the Futsal World Rankings.

== Awards ==
- Team of the Year (2005)
- Mover of the Year (2005, 2008)

== Tournament records ==
=== FIFA Futsal World Cup ===
FIFA Futsal World Cup record
Year	Round	Position	Pld	W	D*	L	GF	GA
(Netherlands) 1989	Did not enter							
(British Hong Kong) 1992	Did not enter							
(Spain) 1996	Did not enter							
(Guatemala) 2000	Did not qualify							
(Chinese Taipei) 2004	Did not enter							
(Brazil) 2008	First round	16th	4	0	1	3	7	14
2012	First round	24th	3	0	0	3	3	22
(Colombia) 2016	Did not qualify							
(Lithuania) 2021	Did not qualify							
(Uzbekistan) 2024	Group stage	18th	3	1	0	2	4	13
Total	Group stage	3/10	10	1	1	8	14	49

=== Africa Futsal Cup of Nations ===
Africa Futsal Cup of Nations record
Year	Round	Position	Pld	W	D*	L	GF	GA
(Egypt) 1996	Did not enter							
(Egypt) 2000	Third Place	3rd	3	1	1	1	15	19
2004	Did not enter							
(Libya) 2008	Champions	1st	6	6	0	0	27	8
(Burkina Faso) 2011	Cancelled							
(South Africa) 2016	Round 1	5th	3	1	1	1	6	5
(Morocco) 2020	Fourth place	4th	5	2	0	3	7	11
(Morocco) 2024	Third Place	3rd	5	2	1	2	18	21
(Morocco) 2026	Group stage	7th	3	0	1	2	3	11
Total	1 Title	6/8	25	12	4	9	76	75

=== Futsal Confederations Cup ===
Futsal Confederations Cup record
Year	Round	Position	Pld	W	D*	L	GF	GA
(Libya) 2009	Third Place	3rd	4	2	0	2	11	11
(Brazil) 2013	Did not enter							
(Kuwait) 2014	Did not enter							
Total	Third Place	1/3	4	2	0	2	11	11

=== Mediterranean Futsal Cup ===
Futsal Confederations Cup record
Year	Round	Position	Pld	W	D*	L	GF	GA
(Libya) 2010	Runners-up	2nd	6	5	0	1	32	13
Total	Runners-up	1/3	4	2	0	2	11	11

=== Arab Futsal Championship ===
Arab Championship Record
Year	Round	Pld	W	D	L	GS	GA
Egypt 1998	Third Place	5	3	0	2	30	23
Egypt 2005	Fourth Place	5	2	0	3	27	28
Libya 2007	Champions	5	4	1	0	17	8
Egypt 2008	Champions	6	6	0	0	43	11
Total	4/4	21	15	1	5	117	70

=== North African Futsal tournament ===
North African Futsal Cup Record
Year	Round	Pld	W	D	L	GS	GA
Libya 2005	Champions	4	4	0	0	24	13
Tunisia 2009	Champions	3	3	0	0	20	3
Libya 2010	Champions	4	4	0	0	34	6
Total	3/3	11	11	0	0	78	22

=== Friendly tournaments ===
==== Futsal Mundialito ====
- 1994 – 2007 weren't invited
- 2008 – 4th Place

==== Grand Prix de Futsal ====
- 2005 – 2009 weren't invited
- 2010 – 10th Place (out of 16)
- 2011 – 2015 weren't invited
- 2017 – TBD

==== Sultat Shaab Cup ====
- 2009 – Champion
- 2010 – Champion

==== Other tournaments ====
- 2006 Four Nations Futsal Tournament (Maputo, Mozambique) – Second Place
- 2008 Four Nations Futsal Cup (Loughborough, England) – Second Place
- 2008 El-Fatih International Futsal Championship – Champion
- 2010 Omar Almokhtar Futsal International Cup –

== See also ==
- Futsal in Libya
- Libya national football team
- Libya women's national football team
- http://roonba.50webs.com/
