= 2005 Arab Futsal Championship =

Tournament details
- Host country: Egypt
- Dates: 19 July - 24 July
- Teams: 7 (from 2 confederations)
- Venue: 1 (in 1 host city)

Final positions
- Champions: Egypt (2nd title)
- Runners-up: Morocco
- Third place: Lebanon
- Fourth place: Libya

Tournament statistics
- Matches played: 13
- Goals scored: 135 (10.38 per match)

The 2005 Arab Futsal Championship took place in Cairo, Egypt from 19 July to 24 July 2005.

== Group stage ==
=== Group 1 ===
Team	Pld	W	D	L	GF	GA	GD	Pts
Egypt	2	2	0	0	18	3	+15	6
Lebanon	2	1	0	1	12	14	−2	3
Tunisia	2	0	0	2	9	22	−13	0
Palestine (W)	0	-	-	-	-	-	—	0

(W) Withdrew

Matches

Match No.	Date	Time	Team 1	Score	Team 2
3	2005-07-19	19:15	Egypt	8 - 0	Lebanon
6	2005-07-20	19:15	Tunisia	3 - 10	Egypt
9	2005-07-21	19:15	Lebanon	12 - 6	Tunisia

=== Group 2 ===
Team	Pld	W	D	L	GF	GA	GD	Pts
Morocco	3	3	0	0	21	6	+15	9
Libya	3	2	0	1	16	13	+3	6
Iraq	3	1	0	2	9	19	−10	3
Algeria	3	0	0	3	6	14	−8	0

Matches

Match No.	Date	Time	Team 1	Score	Team 2
1	2005-07-19	15:00	Morocco	7 - 4	Libya
2	2005-07-19	16:45	Algeria	3 - 4	Iraq
4	2005-07-20	15:00	Algeria	1 - 6	Morocco
5	2005-07-20	16:45	Libya	8 - 4	Iraq
7	2005-07-21	15:00	Morocco	8 - 1	Iraq
8	2005-07-21	16:45	Libya	4 - 2	Algeria

== Semifinals ==
Match No.	Date	Time	Team 1	Score	Team 2
10	2005-07-23	n/a	Egypt	7 - 6	Libya
11	2005-07-23	n/a	Morocco	8 - 4	Lebanon

== 3rd Place ==
Match No.	Date	Time	Team 1	Score	Team 2
12	2005-07-24	n/a	Lebanon	8 - 5	Libya

== Final ==
Match No.	Date	Time	Team 1	Score	Team 2
13	2005-07-24	n/a	Egypt	5 - 1	Morocco

== Honors ==
2005 Arab Futsal Championship

Egypt
Second title

== Sources ==
- Futsal Planet
- RSSF
