= Egypt national futsal team =

National sports team

Egypt
- Nickname(s): The Pharaohs
- Association: Egyptian Football Association
- Confederation: CAF (Africa)
- FIFA code: EGY
- FIFA ranking: 41 ▼1 (24 September 2026)
Home colours	Away colours

First international
- Egypt 6–6 Zimbabwe (Cairo, Egypt; 25 September 1996)

Biggest win
- Egypt 18–2 South Africa (Cairo, Egypt; 21 April 2000)

Biggest defeat
- Brazil 9–0 Egypt (Singapore; 28 November 2001); RFU 9–0 Egypt (Vilnius, Lithuania; 12 September 2021)

FIFA World Cup
- Appearances: 7 (First in 1996)
- Best result: 6th Place (2000)

African Futsal Championship
- Appearances: 6 (First in 1996)
- Best result: (gold) Champions (1996, 2000, 2004)

Confederations Cup
- Appearances: 1 (First in 2014)
- Best result: 5th place (2014)

Grand Prix de Futsal
- Appearances: 2 (First in 2007)
- Best result: 8th place (2007)

The Egyptian national futsal team represents Egypt during international futsal competitions. It is governed by the Egyptian Football Association and won the Africa Futsal Cup of Nations a record three times. Egypt has also represented Africa in the FIFA Futsal World Cup, with seven appearances.

== History ==
On 24 April 2016, Egypt lost the 2016 Africa Futsal Cup of Nations against Morocco after losing 3-2 in the final. 4 years later, they lost for the second consecutive time after being defeated 5-0 in the final.

== Results and fixtures ==
The following is a list of match results in the last 12 months, as well as any future matches that have been scheduled.

Legend

Win Draw Lose Fixture

== Team ==
Head coach: (Egypt) Hesham Saleh

=== Current squad ===
No.	Pos.	Player	Date of birth (age)	Caps	Club
1	GK	Gamal Abdelnaser	20 January 1993 (aged 23)		(Egypt) El-Alamein
2	GK	Mohamed Abdellatif	5 February 1995 (aged 21)		(Egypt) Misr Lel-Makkasa
3	FW	Abdelrahman Elashwal	25 December 1993 (aged 22)		(Egypt) Misr Lel-Makkasa
4	FW	Ahmed Homos	2 May 1993 (aged 23)		(Egypt) Misr Lel-Makkasa
5	DF	Essam Alla	1 September 1994 (aged 22)		(Egypt) El-Bank El-Ahly
6	DF	Mostafa Nader	14 October 1984 (aged 31)		(Egypt) Zamalek
7	DF	Ibrahim Eika	17 October 1987 (aged 28)		(Egypt) Misr Lel-Makkasa
8	DF	Mizo	15 October 1985 (aged 30)		(Egypt) Misr Lel-Makkasa
9	DF	Mohamed Mido	30 September 1984 (aged 31)		(Egypt) El-Shams
10	FW	Ahmed Moza	18 October 1988 (aged 27)		(Egypt) Misr Lel-Makkasa
11	DF	Said Bedir	31 July 1991 (aged 25)		(Egypt) El-Olympi
12	FW	Mostafa Eid	17 August 1992 (aged 24)		(Egypt) Misr Lel-Makkasa
13	FW	Salah Hosny	6 August 1990 (aged 26)		(Egypt) El-Shorta
14	FW	Saber Sayed	2 April 1989 (aged 27)		(Egypt) Misr Lel-Makkasa

== Competitive record ==
*Denotes draws include knockout matches decided on penalty kicks.
**Gold background color indicates that the tournament was won.
***Red border color indicates tournament was held on home soil.

=== FIFA Futsal World Cup ===
Egypt has reached the FIFA Futsal World Cup 7 times, the most in Africa. Egypt attended their first FIFA Futsal World Cup in 1996, when they achieved the first victory for Africa in the competition's history by beating Australia 8–2. Four years later, they reached the Second Round with notable victories over the likes of teams like Uruguay and Russia. Although a draw with Argentina would have granted them a place in the Semi-finals, they lost 3–4 to the Argentina and finished 6th place overall.

The Pharaohs appeared for the third successive time in Taiwan and despite a first-round exit, they made their mark with the biggest margin of victory in the tournament, 12–0 over the hosts.

Egypt didn't pass through the group stage again in 2008 but they progressed through the first round in 2012, losing to Italy 1-5.

Egypt appeared in the Quarterfinals in the 2016 edition, after a 4-3 revenge win against Italy in Extra Time. They would later lose to the eventual winners, Argentina. Egypt qualified to their 7th world cup appearance after reaching the final in the 2020 Africa Futsal Cup.

FIFA Futsal World Cup record
Year	Round	Pld	W	D*	L	GS	GA	DIF
(Netherlands) 1989	Did not enter	–	–	–	–	–	–	–
(Hong Kong) 1992	Did not enter	–	–	–	–	–	–	–
(Spain) 1996	Round 1	3	1	0	2	13	19	–6
(Guatemala) 2000	Round 2	6	3	0	3	27	27	0
(Taiwan) 2004	Round 1	3	1	0	2	16	12	+4
(Brazil) 2008	Round 1	4	1	0	3	9	12	–3
(Thailand) 2012	Round of 16	4	1	0	3	12	14	–2
(Colombia) 2016	Quarterfinals	5	2	0	3	13	17	-4
(Lithuania) 2021	Group stage	3	1	0	2	7	14	-7
(Uzbekistan) 2024	Did not qualify	–	–	–	–	–	–	–
Total	7/10	28	10	0	18	97	115	–18

=== Africa Futsal Cup of Nations ===
Egypt has reached the final match of every tournament.

Africa Futsal Cup of Nations record
Year	Round	Pld	W	D*	L	GS	GA	DIF
Egypt 1996	Champions	4	3	1	0	31	12	+19
Egypt 2000	Champions	3	3	0	0	30	5	+25
2004	Champions	4	3	0	1	43	13	+30
Libya 2008	Runners-up	6	3	2	1	27	12	+15
Burkina Faso 2011	Cancelled	-	-	-	-	-	-	-
South Africa 2016	Runners-up	5	3	1	1	14	11	+3
Morocco 2020	Runners-up	5	4	0	1	20	13	+7
Morocco 2024	Fourth place	5	3	1	1	26	18	+8
Total	6/7	32	22	5	5	191	84	+107

=== Grand Prix de Futsal ===
Egypt were only invited twice.

Grand Prix de Futsal record
Year	Round	Pld	W	D*	L	GS	GA	DIF
Brazil 2005	Did not enter	-	-	-	-	-	-	-
Brazil 2006	Did not enter	-	-	-	-	-	-	-
Brazil 2007	8th place	5	1	0	4	16	19	–3
Brazil 2008	10th place	6	3	0	3	11	16	–5
Brazil 2009-Brazil 2015	Did not enter	-	-	-	-	-	-	-
Total	2/11	11	4	0	7	27	35	-8

=== Futsal Confederations Cup ===
Futsal Confederations Cup record
Year	Round	Pld	W	D*	L	GS	GA	DIF
Libya 2009-Brazil 2013	Did not enter	-	-	-	-	-	-	-
Kuwait 2014	Round 1	3	1	0	2	8	11	–3
Total	1/3	3	1	0	2	8	11	–3

=== Arab Futsal Championship ===
Arab Futsal Championship record
Year	Round	Pld	W	D*	L	GS	GA	DIF
Egypt 1998	Champions	5	5	0	0	49	16	+33
Egypt 2005	Champions	4	4	0	0	30	10	+20
Libya 2007	Runners-up	5	4	0	1	21	7	+14
Egypt 2008	Runners-up	5	4	0	1	23	8	+15
Egypt 2021	Runners-up	5	3	1	1	15	10	+5
Total	5/5	24	20	1	3	138	51	+87
