= 2007 Arab Futsal Championship =

Tournament details
- Host country: Libya
- Dates: January 10 - January 20
- Teams: 6 (from 2 confederations)
- Venue: 1 (in 1 host city)

Final positions
- Champions: Libya (1st title)
- Runners-up: Egypt
- Third place: Lebanon
- Fourth place: Morocco

Tournament statistics
- Matches played: 15
- Goals scored: 101 (6.73 per match)
- Top scorer(s): Abdul-Wahed Mohammed Libya; Hithem Atwe Lebanon (8)
- Best player: Morad Bokare Morocco

The 2007 Arab Futsal Championship was the 3rd Championship and it took place in Tripoli, Libya from January 10 to January 20, 2007.

== Group stage ==
Team	Pld	W	D	L	GF	GA	GD	Pts
Libya	5	4	1	0	17	8	+9	13
Egypt	5	4	0	1	21	7	+14	12
Lebanon	5	2	0	3	24	21	+3	6
Morocco	5	2	0	3	12	18	−6	6
Algeria	5	1	1	3	11	17	−6	4
Tunisia	5	1	0	4	15	29	−14	3

== Matches ==
Date	Team 1	Score	Team 2
2007-01-10	Libya	6 - 3	Morocco
2007-01-11	Lebanon	7 - 3	Algeria
2007-01-11	Egypt	11 - 2	Tunisia
2007-01-12	Algeria	0 - 1	Morocco
2007-01-12	Libya	3 - 1	Tunisia
2007-01-13	Lebanon	0 - 3	Egypt
2007-01-13	Morocco	4 - 1	Tunisia
2007-01-14	Algeria	2 - 4	Egypt
2007-01-14	Libya	4 - 2	Lebanon
2007-01-16	Tunisia	8 - 7	Lebanon
2007-01-16	Morocco	1 - 3	Egypt
2007-01-17	Morocco	3 - 8	Lebanon
2007-01-18	Libya	2 - 2	Algeria
2007-01-20	Tunisia	3 - 4	Algeria
2007-01-20	Libya	2 - 0	Egypt

== Honors ==
2007 Arab Futsal Championship

Libya
First title

- Best Player: Morad Bokare - Morocco
- Best Goalkeeper: Mohammed Al-Sharif - Libya
- Top Goal Scorer: Abdul-Wahed Mohammed (8) - Libya & Hithem Atwe (8) - Lebanon
- Fair-Play Team: Tunisia

== Sources ==
- Futsal Planet
- RSSF
