= 1998 Arab Futsal Championship =

Tournament details
- Host country: Egypt
- Dates: 6 December - 12 December
- Teams: 8 (from 2 confederations)
- Venue: 1 (in 1 host city)

Final positions
- Champions: Egypt (1st title)
- Runners-up: Morocco
- Third place: Libya
- Fourth place: Palestine

Tournament statistics
- Matches played: 14
- Goals scored: 168 (12 per match)

The 1998 Arab Futsal Championship took place in Cairo, Egypt from 6 December to 12 December 1998. Mauritania were originally invited, but declined and were replaced by Palestine.

Egypt defeated Morocco in the final, 8-4.

== Group stage ==
=== Group 1 ===
| Team | Pld | W | D | L | GF | GA | GD | Pts |
|---|---|---|---|---|---|---|---|---|
| Egypt | 3 | 3 | 0 | 0 | 34 | 9 | +25 | 6 |
| Palestine | 3 | 2 | 0 | 1 | 17 | 11 | +6 | 4 |
| Sudan | 3 | 1 | 0 | 2 | 8 | 21 | −13 | 2 |
| Somalia | 3 | 0 | 0 | 3 | 1 | 19 | −18 | 0 |

Matches

| Date | Team 1 | Score | Team 2 |
|---|---|---|---|
| 1998-12-06 | Egypt | 9 - 5 | Palestine |
| 1998-12-06 | Sudan | 3 - 0 | Somalia |
| 1998-12-07 | Egypt | 12 - 3 | Sudan |
| 1998-12-07 | Palestine | 3 - 0 | Somalia |
| 1998-12-08 | Egypt | 13 - 1 | Somalia |
| 1998-12-08 | Palestine | 9 - 2 | Sudan |

=== Group 2 ===
| Team | Pld | W | D | L | GF | GA | GD | Pts |
|---|---|---|---|---|---|---|---|---|
| Morocco | 3 | 3 | 0 | 0 | 22 | 10 | +12 | 6 |
| Libya | 3 | 2 | 0 | 1 | 21 | 14 | +7 | 4 |
| Jordan | 3 | 1 | 0 | 2 | 24 | 19 | +5 | 2 |
| Algeria | 3 | 0 | 0 | 3 | 12 | 32 | −20 | 0 |

Matches

| Date | Team 1 | Score | Team 2 |
|---|---|---|---|
| 1998-12-06 | Morocco | 6 - 3 | Libya |
| 1998-12-06 | Algeria | 6 - 15 | Jordan |
| 1998-12-07 | Algeria | 2 - 8 | Morocco |
| 1998-12-07 | Libya | 5 - 4 | Jordan |
| 1998-12-08 | Morocco | 8 - 5 | Jordan |
| 1998-12-08 | Libya | 11 - 4 | Algeria |

== Semifinals ==
| Date | Team 1 | Score | Team 2 |
|---|---|---|---|
| 1998-12-10 | Egypt | 7 - 3 | Libya |
| 1998-12-10 | Morocco | 4 - 1 | Palestine |

== 3rd Place ==
| Date | Team 1 | Score | Team 2 |
|---|---|---|---|
| 1998-12-12 | Palestine | 2 - 6 | Libya |

== Final ==
| Date | Team 1 | Score | Team 2 |
|---|---|---|---|
| 1998-12-12 | Egypt | 8 - 4 (4-4) AET | Morocco |

== Honors ==
1998 Arab Futsal Championship

Egypt
First title

== Sources ==
- Futsal Planet
- RSSSF
- Scores
