= 2020 Futsal Africa Cup of Nations qualification =

2020 Africa Futsal Cup of Nations qualification
Tournament details
- Dates: 23–30 October 2019
- Teams: 10 (from 1 confederation)

Tournament statistics
- Matches played: 6
- Goals scored: 44 (7.33 per match)
- Top scorer(s): (Angola) Prado (5 goals)

The 2020 Africa Futsal Cup of Nations qualification was the qualification process organized by the Confederation of African Football (CAF) to determine the participating teams for the 2020 Africa Futsal Cup of Nations, the 6th edition of the international men's futsal championship of Africa.

== Teams ==
A total of 10 teams entered the qualifying rounds.

Round	Teams entering round	No. of teams
Preliminary round	Algeria; Angola; Cameroon; Cape Verde; Equatorial Guinea; Guinea; Libya; Mauritius; South Africa; Zambia	10
Final tournament	Morocco (hosts); Egypt (African team in 2016 FIFA Futsal World Cup); Mozambique (African team in 2016 FIFA Futsal World Cup)	3

Did not enter
- Benin
- Botswana
- Burkina Faso
- Burundi
- Central African Republic
- Chad
- Comoros
- Congo
- Djibouti
- DR Congo
- Eritrea
- Ethiopia
- Gabon
- Gambia
- Ghana
- Guinea-Bissau
- Ivory Coast
- Kenya
- Lesotho
- Liberia
- Madagascar
- Malawi
- Mali
- Mauritania
- Namibia
- Niger
- Nigeria
- Rwanda
- São Tomé and Príncipe
- Senegal
- Seychelles
- Sierra Leone
- Somalia
- South Sudan
- Sudan
- Eswatini
- Tanzania
- Togo
- Tunisia
- Uganda
- Zimbabwe

== Format ==
Qualification ties were played on a home-and-away two-legged basis. If the aggregate score was tied after the second leg, the away goals rule would be applied, and if still level, the penalty shoot-out would be used to determine the winner (no extra time would be played).

The five winners of the preliminary round qualified for the final tournament.

== Schedule ==
The schedule of the qualifying rounds was as follows.

Round	Leg	Date
Preliminary round	First leg	23–26 October 2019
Preliminary round	Second leg	29–30 October 2019

== Preliminary round ==
Morocco qualified automatically as hosts, and Egypt and Mozambique also qualified automatically as the other African teams in the 2016 FIFA Futsal World Cup, while the remaining five spots were determined by the qualifying rounds, which took take place in October 2019.

Team 1	Agg.	Team 2	1st leg	2nd leg
Cape Verde	w/o (Note: Guinea won on a walkover after Cape Verde withdrew.)	Guinea	—	—
Algeria	6–12	Libya	2–5	4–7
Equatorial Guinea	w/o (Note: Equatorial Guinea won on a walkover after Cameroon withdrew.)	Cameroon	—	—
Zambia	1–13	Angola	0–4	1–9
Mauritius	1–11	South Africa	0–6	1–5

26 October 2019
19:00 UTC+1

Algeria	2–5	Libya
Melki 37', 39'	Report	Al-Toumi 5'; Al-Mahmal 8'; Rahoma 10'; Suleiman 18'; Seghir 32'

La Coupole, Algiers
Referee: Nabil Guéddich (Tunisia)
30 October 2019
19:00 UTC+2

Libya	7–4	Algeria
Al-Toumi; Al-Mahmal; Al-Shoushan; Suleiman; Sharksih; Massaud		Goal

Maadi Olympic Center, Cairo (Egypt) (Note: Libya played their home leg in Egypt due to the Libyan Civil War.)
Referee: Tarek El-Khataby (Egypt)

Libya won 12–6 on aggregate.

23 October 2019
15:00 UTC+2

Zambia	0–4	Angola
		Prado 2', 20'; Caluanda 27'; Jó 28'

Olympic Youth Development Centre, Lusaka
29 October 2019
17:00 UTC+1

Angola	9–1	Zambia
Bebucho 4'; Manocele 7', 23', 25'; Caluanda 8' (pen.); Prado 24', 36', 39'; Jó 36'		Kaoma 40'

Pavilhão da Cidadela, Luanda
Referee: Sipho Mahlangu (South Africa)

Angola won 13–1 on aggregate.

26 October 2019
18:30 UTC+4

Mauritius	0–6	South Africa

Phoenix Gymnasium, Port Louis
30 October 2019
19:30 UTC+2

South Africa	5–1	Mauritius
Ngcobo 15'; Cele 25'; Joharie 27'; Donnelly 30'; Ryan 35'		Perle 36'

Orlando Community Hall, Soweto

South Africa won 11–1 on aggregate. South Africa withdrew from the tournament on 15 January 2020 as they refused to play in Laayoune of Western Sahara due to the Western Sahara conflict and were replaced by Mauritius.

== Qualified teams ==
The following eight teams qualified for the final tournament. South Africa, which originally qualified, withdrew and were replaced by Mauritius.

Team	Qualified on	Previous appearances in tournament^{1}
Morocco (hosts)	29 September 2018	4 (2000, 2004, 2008, **2016**)
Egypt	29 September 2018	5 (**1996**, **2000**, **2004**, 2008, 2016)
Mozambique	29 September 2018	3 (2004, 2008, 2016)
Guinea	26 September 2019	0 (debut)
Libya	30 October 2019	3 (2000, **2008**, 2016)
Equatorial Guinea	22 October 2019	0 (debut)
Angola	29 October 2019	2 (2008, 2016)
Mauritius	16 January 2020	0 (debut)

^{1} Bold indicates champion for that year. Italic indicates host for that year.

== Goalscorers ==
There were 27 goals scored in 4 matches, for an average of 6.75 goals per match.

5 goals

- (Angola) Prado

3 goals

- (Angola) Manocele

2 goals

- (Algeria) Bryan Melki
- (Angola) Caluanda
- (Angola) Jó

1 goal

- (Angola) Bebucho
- (Libya) Ibrahim Al-Mahmal
- (Libya) Adham Al-Toumi
- (Libya) Mohamed Rahoma
- (Libya) Abdelhalim Seghir
- (Libya) Mohamed Suleiman
- (Mauritius) Aurélien Perle
- (South Africa) Wiseman Cele
- (South Africa) Renaldo Donnelly
- (South Africa) Yazeed Joharie
- (South Africa) Quincy Ngcobo
- (South Africa) Jean-Marc Ryan
- (Zambia) Carlos Kaoma
