= 2026 Futsal Africa Cup of Nations qualification =

2026 Futsal Africa Cup of Nations qualifying
Tournament details
- Dates: 23 January – 8 February 2026
- Teams: 18 (from 1 confederation)

The 2026 Futsal Africa Cup of Nations qualifying competition is the upcoming men's futsal competition that will determine the 7 teams joining the automatically qualified hosts Morocco in the 2026 Futsal Africa Cup of Nations final tournament.

A total of 19 CAF member national teams entered the competition. Apart from host Morocco, the remaining 18 teams entered the qualifying competition. The 10 highest-ranked teams based on the FIFA Futsal World Ranking of 11 December 2025 were given byes to the second round, while the remaining 8 teams entered in the first round.

== Entrants ==
The teams were ranked according to their FIFA Futsal World Ranking of 11 December 2025.

Final tournament hosts
Team	Pts.	Rank
Morocco	1481.26	6

Participating teams for the 2026 Futsal Africa Cup of Nations qualifying rounds

Teams entering second round
Team	Pts.	Rank
Egypt	1098.56	39
Libya	1053.77	50
Angola	1021.19	59
Ivory Coast	974.01	76
Mozambique	952.11	85
Zambia	939.53	92
Algeria	916.56	100
Guinea	855.87	117
Mauritania	824.42	126
Ghana	746.68	134

Teams entering first round
Team	Pts.	Rank
Tanzania	730.96	136
Namibia	715.55	137
Cameroon	Unranked (Note: The team is unranked after exceeding the inactivity period; its last match was played on 13 December 2015 against Angola.)	
Cape Verde	—N/a	
Kenya	—N/a	
Senegal	—N/a	
South Sudan	—N/a	
Zimbabwe	—N/a	

Did not enter

The following 12 associations have futsal teams but chose not to enter the competition, while the remaining 23 associations do not have futsal national teams and therefore did not enter.

- Comoros (102)
- DR Congo
- Equatorial Guinea (66)
- Guinea-Bissau
- Madagascar
- Mauritius (111)
- Nigeria
- South Africa (58)
- São Tomé and Príncipe
- Somalia (168)
- Sudan
- Tunisia

== Draw ==
The draw for the qualifying competition took place in Rabat, Morocco at 18:00 GMT, 7 January 2026.

The eight lowest-ranked teams were divided into two pots and drawn in pairs to form four fixtures, with each pot producing two pairings.

Based on the FIFA rankings, the four highest-ranked teams (Egypt, Libya, Angola and Côte d'Ivoire) were drawn to face the winners of the First Round. In each tie, the higher-ranked team will host the second leg. The remaining teams were allocated into two pots, with the higher-ranked teams placed in Pot 3 and the remaining teams in Pot 4. One team from Pot 4 was drawn against one team from Pot 3 until all teams were paired, with the higher-ranked team hosting the second leg.

First round pots
Pot 1	Pot 2
Cameroon; Cape Verde; Senegal; South Sudan	Kenya; Namibia; Tanzania; Zimbabwe

Second round pots
Pot 3	Pot 4
Mozambique; Zambia; Algeria	Ghana; Guinea; Mauritania

== First round ==
Team 1	Agg.	Team 2	1st leg	2nd leg
Cape Verde	9–2	Senegal	4–0	5–2
Namibia	18–11	Kenya	8–4	10–7
Cameroon	w/o	South Sudan	—	—
Zimbabwe	w/o	Tanzania	—	—

23 January 2026
15:00 UTC−1

Cape Verde	4–0	Senegal
Helder Semedo; Rui Fortes; Ezequiel Reis

Pavilhão Municipal, Tarrafal
28 January 2026
16:00 UTC+0

Senegal	2–5	Cape Verde
		Isaías Furtado; Rui Fortes; Joel Ribeiro

Dakar Arena, Diamniadio

23 January 2026
19:00 UTC+2

Namibia	8–4	Kenya
Matheus Humphries; Ichshaun von Francois; Wesley Otto; George Haikali; Ken Salote		Mike Ochieng Otieno; Anas Mahad Shiek; Mohamed Hassan Yusuf

MTC The Dome, Swakopmund
28 January 2026
15:00 UTC+3

Kenya	7–10	Namibia
		Ichshaun Von Francois; Luis Solunga; Celso Roberto; Wesley Otto; Nanguei Kamatuka; Ken Salote; Undefined (o.g.)

Kasarani Indoor Arena, Nairobi

== Second round ==
Team 1	Agg.	Team 2	1st leg	2nd leg
Cape Verde	6–8	Egypt	5–5	1–3
Namibia	4–19	Libya	3–11	1–8
Cameroon	1–19	Angola	0–12	1–7
Tanzania	9–7	Ivory Coast	7–3	2–4
Ghana	6–8	Zambia	6–6	0–2
Mauritania	4–7	Mozambique	3–4	1–3
Guinea	1–11	Algeria	0–4	1–7

3 February 2026
16:00 UTC−1

Cape Verde	5–5	Egypt
Isaías Furtado; Undefined (o.g.); Rui Fortes; Gerson Sanches		Ahmed Ali; Ebrahim El Sayed; Khaled Yousry

Pavilhão Municipal, Tarrafal
8 February 2026
19:00 UTC+2

Egypt	3–1	Cape Verde

Cairo Stadium Hall 2, Cairo

4 February 2026
19:00 UTC+2

Namibia	3–11	Libya
Ichshaun von Francois; George Haikali; Luis Solunga		Ali Shoshan; Ibrahim Lemhammel; Fares Bukhshim; Ahmed Ezwai; Mohamed Said; Abdulhakim Rashid; Ahmed Al-Yumni

MTC The Dome, Swakopmund
8 February 2026
21:00 UTC+2

Libya	8–1	Namibia

Misrata Sporting Hall, Misrata

3 February 2026
17:00 UTC+1

Cameroon	0–12	Angola

Yaoundé Multipurpose Sports Complex, Yaoundé
9 February 2026
20:00 UTC+1

Angola	7–1	Cameroon

Arena do Quilamba, Luanda

3 February 2026
22:00 UTC+3

Tanzania	7–3	Ivory Coast
Gidion Paul; Sharif Wilson; Bashiri Kibaila; Razack Juma; Adolfu Hamisi		Stéphane Toh 7'; Roméo Langui 28'; Unknown

Amaan Stadium, Zanzibar
7 February 2026
16:00 UTC+0

Ivory Coast	4–2	Tanzania
		Razack Juma; Sharif Wilson

Parc des sports de Treichville, Abidjan
Referee: Said El Haoud (Morocco), Khalid Hnich (Morocco)

3 February 2026
18:00 UTC+0

Ghana	6–6	Zambia

UCC Sports Hall, Cape Coast
8 February 2026
16:00 UTC+2

Zambia	2–0	Ghana

Automotive Indoor Futsal Arena, Lusaka

3 February 2026
15:00 UTC+0

Mauritania	3–4	Mozambique

Salle Mohammed V, Casablanca (Morocco)
8 February 2026
16:30 UTC+2

Mozambique	3–1	Mauritania

Pavilhão Da Liga Desportiva De Maputo, Maputo

4 February 2026
16:00 UTC+0

Guinea	0–4	Algeria
		Rayane Aït Hamadouche; Walid Betterki; Abdelhak Djebrani

Stade du 28 Septembre Gymnasium, Conakry
Referee: Abel Kouamé Junior (Ivory Coast)
8 February 2026
18:00 UTC+1

Algeria	7–1	Guinea
Amar Bessa 2', 34'; Rayane Aït Hamadouche 13'; Walid Riache 18' (pen.); Samyr Teffaf 34'; Mathieu Hammad 36'; Bilal Bentout 40'		Mohamadou Tamanaté 7'

Miloud Hadefi Complex Omnisport Arena, Oran
Referee: Ndubuisi Ukah Odigomna (Nigeria)

== Qualified teams ==
The following 8 teams qualified for 2026 Futsal Africa Cup of Nations.

Team	Qualified as	Qualified on	Previous appearances in Futsal AFCON^{1}
Morocco	host	4 January 2026	6 (2000, 2004, 2008, **2016**, **2020**, **2024**)
Tanzania	Second round winners	7 February 2026	0 (debut)
Zambia	Second round winners	8 February 2026	3 (2008, 2016, 2024)
Mozambique	Second round winners	8 February 2026	4 (2004, 2008, 2016, 2020)
Algeria	Second round winners	8 February 2026	0 (debut)
Egypt	Second round winners	8 February 2026	7 (**1996**, **2000**, **2004**, 2008, 2016, 2020, 2024)
Libya	Second round winners	8 February 2026	5 (2000, **2008**, 2016, 2020, 2024)
Angola	Second round winners	9 February 2026	4 (2008, 2016, 2020, 2024)

^{1} Bold indicates champions for that year. Italic indicates hosts for that year.
