= 2024 Futsal Africa Cup of Nations qualification =

2024 Africa Futsal Cup of Nations qualification
Tournament details
- Dates: 2–11 February 2024
- Teams: 10 (from 1 confederation)

The 2024 Futsal Africa Cup of Nations qualification is the qualification process organized by the Confederation of African Football (CAF) to determine the participating teams for the 2024 Futsal Africa Cup of Nations, the 7th edition of the international men's futsal championship of Africa.

== Teams ==
A total of 10 teams entered the qualifying rounds.

| Round | Teams entering round | No. of teams |
|---|---|---|
| Preliminary round | Algeria; Cameroon; Ghana; Ivory Coast; Libya; Mauritania; Mozambique; Namibia; Tanzania; Zambia | 10 |
| Final tournament | Angola (2020 Futsal Afcon third place); Egypt (2020 Futsal Afcon runners-up); Morocco (2020 Futsal Afcon champions) | 3 |

Did not enter
- Benin
- Botswana
- Burkina Faso
- Burundi
- Cape Verde
- Central African Republic
- Chad
- Comoros
- Congo
- Djibouti
- DR Congo
- Equatorial Guinea
- Eritrea
- Ethiopia
- Gabon
- Gambia
- Guinea
- Guinea-Bissau
- Kenya
- Lesotho
- Liberia
- Madagascar
- Malawi
- Mali
- Mauritius
- Niger
- Nigeria
- Rwanda
- São Tomé and Príncipe
- Senegal
- Seychelles
- Sierra Leone
- Somalia
- South Africa
- South Sudan
- Sudan
- Eswatini
- Togo
- Tunisia
- Uganda
- Zimbabwe

== Draw ==
The 2024 Qualifiers official draw was held on 23 December 2024 at 6th of October City, Giza in Egypt, the CAF Headquarters.

| | Pot 1 | Pot 2 |
|---|---|---|
| Pots | 1. Mozambique; 2. Zambia; 3. Namibia; 4. Tanzania | 1. Cameroon; 2. Ghana; 3. Algeria; 4. Ivory Coast; 5. Libya; 6. Mauritania |

== Format ==
Qualification ties were played on a home-and-away two-legged basis. If the aggregate score was tied after the second leg, the away goals rule would be applied, and if still level, the penalty shoot-out would be used to determine the winner (no extra time would be played).

The five winners of the preliminary round qualified for the final tournament.

== Schedule ==
The schedule of the qualifying rounds was as follows.

| Round | Leg | Date |
|---|---|---|
| Preliminary round | First leg | 2–4 February 2024 |
| Preliminary round | Second leg | 9–11 February 2024 |

== Preliminary round ==
| Team 1 | Agg. | Team 2 | 1st leg | 2nd leg |
|---|---|---|---|---|
| Mozambique | 3–4 | Zambia | 3–2 | 0–2 |
| Namibia | 8–8 (a) | Tanzania | 2–5 | 6–3 |
| Libya | 6–5 | Algeria | 4–4 | 2–1 |
| Ghana | 6–6 (a) | Ivory Coast | 0–4 | 6–2 |
| Cameroon | dq | Mauritania | — | — |

3 February 2024
18:00 UTC+2

| Mozambique | 3–2 | Zambia |

Pavilhão Da Uem, Maputo
10 February 2024
16:00 UTC+2

| Zambia | 2–0 | Mozambique |
|---|---|---|
| Banda 14'; Chinyama 36' |

Automotive Futsal Arena, Lusaka

Zambia won 4–3 on aggregate.

3 February 2024
19:00 UTC+1

| Namibia | 2–5 | Tanzania |

Windhoek Showgrounds Sport Plaza, Windhoek
9 February 2024
20:00 UTC+3

| Tanzania | 3–6 | Namibia |

Starlight Futsal Arena, Dar es Salam

8–8 on aggregate. Namibia won on away goals.

3 February 2024
20:00 UTC+2

| Libya | 4–4 | Algeria |
|---|---|---|
| Al-Shushan ?, ?; Lamhammel ?; Al-Ajnaf ? | Report (FAF) | Bendifallah ?; Medjahed ?, ?; Teffaf ? |

Misrata Sporting Hall, Misrata
10 February 2024
19:00 UTC+1

| Algeria | 1–2 | Libya |
|---|---|---|
| Bensaber 1' | | Al-Ghoul ?; Al-Yamani 40' |

La Coupole, Algiers

Libya won 6–5 on aggregate.

2 February 2024
15:00 UTC+0

| Ghana | 0–4 | Ivory Coast |

University of Cape Coast Sports Hall, Cape Coast
9 February 2024
--:--

| Ivory Coast | 2–6 | Ghana |

6–6 on aggregate. Ghana won on away goals.

2–4 February 2024

| Cameroon | Cancelled | Mauritania |

9–11 February 2024

| Mauritania | Cancelled | Cameroon |

Mauritania advanced to the final tournament after Cameroon was disqualified from the competition due to sanctions imposed by CAF, for their withdrawal from last edition qualifiers.

== Qualified teams ==
The following eight teams qualified for the final tournament. Angola, Egypt and Morocco qualified automatically.

| Team | Qualified on | Previous appearances in tournament^{1} |
|---|---|---|
| Angola | 23 December 2023 | 3 (2008, 2016, 2020) |
| Egypt | 23 December 2023 | 6 (**1996**, **2000**, **2004**, 2008, 2016, 2020) |
| Morocco | 23 December 2023 | 5 (2000, 2004, 2008, **2016**, **2020**) |
| Mauritania | 28 January 2024 | 0 (debut) |
| Namibia | 9 February 2024 | 0 (debut) |
| Ghana | 9 February 2024 | 1 (1996) |
| Zambia | 10 February 2024 | 2 (2008, 2016) |
| Libya | 10 February 2024 | 4 (2000, **2008**, 2016, 2020) |

^{1} Bold indicates champion for that year. Italic indicates host for that year.
