= 2016 Futsal Africa Cup of Nations qualification =

2016 Africa Futsal Cup of Nations qualification
Tournament details
- Dates: 6–14 December 2015
- Teams: 12 (from 1 confederation)

Tournament statistics
- Matches played: 10
- Goals scored: 83 (8.3 per match)

The 2016 Africa Futsal Cup of Nations qualification was a men's futsal competition which decided the participating teams of the 2016 Futsal Africa Cup of Nations.

A total of eight teams qualified to play in the final tournament, including South Africa who qualified automatically as hosts, and Egypt who qualified automatically as the highest-placed African team in the 2012 FIFA Futsal World Cup.

== Teams ==
A total of 12 teams entered the qualifying rounds.

Round	Teams entering round	No. of teams
Preliminary round	Angola; Cameroon; Equatorial Guinea; Libya; Ivory Coast; Madagascar; Morocco; Mozambique; Nigeria; Sudan; Tunisia; Zambia	12
Final tournament	South Africa (hosts); Egypt (highest-placed African team in 2012 FIFA Futsal World Cup)	2

Did not enter
- Algeria
- Benin
- Botswana
- Burkina Faso
- Burundi
- Cape Verde
- Central African Republic
- Chad
- Comoros
- Congo
- Djibouti
- DR Congo
- Eritrea
- Ethiopia
- Gabon
- Gambia
- Ghana
- Guinea
- Guinea-Bissau
- Kenya
- Lesotho
- Liberia
- Malawi
- Mali
- Mauritania
- Mauritius
- Namibia
- Niger
- Rwanda
- São Tomé and Príncipe
- Senegal
- Seychelles
- Sierra Leone
- Somalia
- South Sudan
- Eswatini
- Tanzania
- Togo
- Uganda
- Zimbabwe

== Format ==
Qualification ties were played on a home-and-away two-legged basis. If the aggregate score was tied after the second leg, the away goals rule would be applied, and if still level, the penalty shoot-out would be used to determine the winner (no extra time would be played).

The six winners of the preliminary round qualified for the final tournament.

== Schedule ==
The schedule of the qualifying rounds was as follows.

Round	Leg	Date
Preliminary round	First leg	6 December 2015
Preliminary round	Second leg	13 December 2015

== Preliminary round ==
Winners qualified for 2016 Futsal Africa Cup of Nations.

Team 1	Agg.	Team 2	1st leg	2nd leg
Cameroon	4–12	Angola	3–5	1–7
Tunisia	w/o	Nigeria	—	—
Zambia	7–7 (a)	Equatorial Guinea	3–2	4–5
Ivory Coast	2–12	Morocco	2–7	0–5
Madagascar	4–17	Mozambique	1–7	3–10
Sudan	4–14	Libya	4–9	0–5

Notes

1. Nigeria withdrew from the tournament, therefore Tunisia qualified automatically.
2. In the second leg between Equatorial Guinea and Zambia, the referees incorrectly played extra time when the score at full time was 5–4 to Equatorial Guinea (7–7 on aggregate), which Equatorial Guinea went on to win 7–5 (8–7 on aggregate). CAF's rules state that the team with the most away goals wins in the event of a tie, and so CAF later declared the extra time played null and void, and Zambia the winners by virtue of the away goals rule.
3. Libya played their home match in Tunisia due to security concerns.
6 December 2015
15:00 UTC+1

Cameroon	3–5	Angola
Atangana 3', 24', 26'		Ribeiro 2', 39' (pen.); Dos Santos 6'; Barata 12'; Martins 36'

Yaoundé
13 December 2015
16:00 UTC+1

Angola	7–1	Cameroon
Silva 4', 18'; Texeira 10'; Ribeiro 20', 33'; Neto 36', 39'		Atangana 19'

Pavilhão da Cidadela, Luanda

Angola won 12–4 on aggregate.

6 December 2015

Tunisia	Cancelled	Nigeria

13 December 2015

Nigeria	Cancelled	Tunisia

Tunisia won on walkover.

6 December 2015
15:00 UTC+2

Zambia	3–2	Equatorial Guinea
Shanchebo 9'; Ndhlovu 12'; Chama 14'		Muller 33'; Tobe 34'

National Heroes Stadium, Lusaka
13 December 2015
18:00 UTC+1

Equatorial Guinea	5–4	Zambia
Muller 7'; Keny 12', 32'; Manami 13'; Tobe 26'		Chama 9'; Chulu 11'; Kaampze 21'; Phiri 23'

Malabo

7–7 on aggregate. Zambia won on away goals.

6 December 2015
19:00 UTC±0

Ivory Coast	2–7	Morocco
Goal		Goal

Abidjan
13 December 2015
15:00 UTC±0

Morocco	5–0	Ivory Coast
Mohamed Jouad 10', 29'; Bilal Bakkali 15'; Youssef Elmazray 25', 33'

Salle Futsal Saknia, Kenitra

Morocco won 12–2 on aggregate.

6 December 2015

Madagascar	1–7	Mozambique
Goal		Goal

13 December 2015
15:00 UTC+2

Mozambique	10–3	Madagascar
Goal		Goal

Pavilhao de Academica, Maputo

Mozambique won 17–4 on aggregate.

6 December 2015
17:00 UTC+3

Sudan	4–9	Libya
A. Ahmed 4', 30'; M. Ahmed 17'; Abdelnoor 33'		Rahoma 10', 31'; Al-Shawain 16'; Abdelrahim 18', 26', 29'; Al-Toumi 19'; Ahmed 32'; Al-Khoga 39'

Khartoum
13 December 2015
17:00 UTC+1

Libya	5–0	Sudan
Abdelrahim 3', 23'; Al-Serksia 17'; Aghila 31'; Al-Khoga 37'

Stade Mustapha Ben Jannet, Monastir

Libya won 14–4 on aggregate.

== Qualified teams ==
The following eight teams qualified for the final tournament.

Team	Qualified on	Previous appearances in tournament^{1}
South Africa (hosts)	3 November 2015	3 (2000, 2004, 2008)
Egypt	3 November 2015	4 (**1996**, **2000**, **2004**, 2008)
Angola	13 December 2015	1 (2008)
Tunisia	6 December 2015	1 (2008)
Zambia	13 December 2015	1 (2008)
Morocco	13 December 2015	3 (2000, 2004, 2008)
Mozambique	13 December 2015	2 (2004, 2008)
Libya	13 December 2015	2 (2000, **2008**)

^{1} Bold indicates champion for that year. Italic indicates host for that year.

== Goalscorers ==
There were 48 goals scored in 6 matches, for an average of 8 goals per match.

5 goals

- (Libya) Rabia Abdelrahim

4 goals

- (Angola) Paulo Ribeiro
- (Cameroon) Barnabé Atangana

2 goals

- (Angola) Edvanio Neto
- (Angola) Artur Silva
- (Equatorial Guinea) Keny
- (Equatorial Guinea) Muller
- (Equatorial Guinea) Roberto Tobe
- (Libya) Fathi Al-Khoga
- (Libya) Mohamed Rahoma
- (Sudan) Ammar Ahmed
- (Zambia) Adrian Chama

1 goal

- (Angola) Klisman Barata
- (Angola) Nuno Dos Santos
- (Angola) Celso Martins
- (Angola) Gilson Texeira
- (Equatorial Guinea) Domingo Manami
- (Libya) Salem Aghila
- (Libya) Bader Ahmed
- (Libya) Abdulhalim Al-Serksia
- (Libya) Hamdi Al-Shawain
- (Libya) Adham Al-Toumi
- (Sudan) Mergani Abdelnoor
- (Sudan) Mohamed Ahmed
- (Zambia) Kenneth Chulu
- (Zambia) Michelo Kaampze
- (Zambia) Boniface Ndhlovu
- (Zambia) Bobby Phiri
- (Zambia) Enock Shanchebo
