= 2012 FIFA Futsal World Cup qualification =

The qualification competition for the 2012 FIFA Futsal World Cup was a series of tournaments organised by the six FIFA confederations.

== Qualified teams ==
Team	Order of qualification	Method of qualification	Date of qualification	Finals appearance	Consecutive World Cups	Last appearance	Previous best performance
Thailand	1st	Host	19 Mar 2010	4	4	2008	Round 1 (2000, 2004, 2008)
Solomon Islands	2nd	Oceanian Futsal Championship	20 May 2011	2	2	2008	Round 1 (2008)
Ukraine	3rd	UEFA Preliminary Competition	8 Apr 2012	4	3	2008	4th (1996)
Serbia	4th	UEFA Preliminary Competition	8 Apr 2012	1	1	—	—
Russia	5th	UEFA Preliminary Competition	9 Apr 2012	5	2	2008	3rd (1996)
Spain	6th	UEFA Preliminary Competition	10 Apr 2012	7	7	2008	Winners (2000, 2004)
Portugal	7th	UEFA Preliminary Competition	10 Apr 2012	4	4	2008	3rd (2000)
Czech Republic	8th	UEFA Preliminary Competition	11 Apr 2012	3	3	2008	Round 2 (2004)
Italy	9th	UEFA Preliminary Competition	11 Apr 2012	6	3	2008	2nd (2004)
Brazil	10th	CONMEBOL Preliminary Competition	17 Apr 2012	7	7	2008	Winners (1989, 1992, 1996, 2008)
Argentina	11th	CONMEBOL Preliminary Competition	18 Apr 2012	7	7	2008	4th (2004)
Paraguay	12th	CONMEBOL Preliminary Competition	19 Apr 2012	5	3	2008	Round 2 (1989, 2008)
Colombia	13th	CONMEBOL Preliminary Competition	19 Apr 2012	1	1	—	—
Japan	14th	AFC Futsal Championship	01 Jun 2012	4	3	2008	Round 1 (2008)
Iran	15th	AFC Futsal Championship	01 Jun 2012	6	6	2008	4th (1992)
Australia	16th	AFC Futsal Championship	01 Jun 2012	6	5	2004	Round 1 (1989)
Kuwait	17th	AFC Futsal Championship	01 Jun 2012	1	1	—	—
Egypt	18th	CAF Preliminary Competition	19 Jun 2012	5	5	2008	Round 2 (2000)
Libya	19th	CAF Preliminary Competition	23 Jun 2012	2	2	2008	Round 1 (2008)
Morocco	20th	CAF Preliminary Competition	23 Jun 2012	1	1	—	—

== Africa (CAF) ==
Team 1	Agg.	Team 2	1st leg	2nd leg
Mozambique	6–7	Morocco	2–6	4–1
Egypt	8–2	Nigeria	8–2	w/o
Libya	10–4	South Africa	4–0	6–4

Morocco, Egypt & Libya qualified.

== Europe (UEFA) ==
Team 1	Agg.	Team 2	1st leg	2nd leg
Slovakia	0–12	Spain	0–4	0–8
Azerbaijan	4–5	Russia	2–3	2–2
Norway	0–7	Italy	0–5	0–2
Belarus	2–11	Portugal	1–7	1–4
Slovenia	3–4	Czech Republic	2–0	1–4
Romania	4–5	Ukraine	0–4	4–1
Hungary	2–6	Serbia	1–0	1–6

Spain, Russia, Italy, Portugal, Czech Republic, Ukraine & Serbia qualified.

== Asia (AFC) ==
Quarter-finals
May 29 – Dubai
Thailand	5
Lebanon	3
May 29 – Dubai
Iran	6
Uzbekistan	3
May 29 – Dubai
Japan	1
Kyrgyzstan	0
May 29 – Dubai
Kuwait	2
Australia (a.e.t.)	3

Semi-finals
May 30 – Dubai
Thailand (a.e.t.)	5
Iran	4
May 30 – Dubai
Japan	3
Australia	0

Final
June 1 – Dubai
Thailand	1
Japan	6
Third place
June 1 – Dubai
Iran	4
Australia	0

Japan, Iran, Australia & Kuwait qualified.

== North America, Central America and Caribbean (CONCACAF) ==
=== Group A ===
Team	Pld	W	D	L	GF	GA	GD	Pts
Guatemala	3	3	0	0	14	6	+8	9
Panama	3	2	0	1	15	12	+3	6
United States	3	1	0	2	6	9	-3	3
Canada	3	0	0	3	10	18	-8	0

=== Group B ===
Team	Pld	W	D	L	GF	GA	GD	Pts
Costa Rica	3	2	1	0	13	6	+7	7
Mexico	3	2	1	0	14	9	+5	7
Cuba	3	1	0	2	12	7	+5	3
Saint Kitts and Nevis	3	0	0	3	5	22	-17	0

Guatemala, Panama, Mexico & Costa Rica qualified.

== Oceania (OFC) ==
=== Final ===
20 May 2011

Tahiti	4–6	Solomon Islands

Vodafone Arena, Suva

Solomon Islands qualified.

== South America (CONMEBOL) ==
=== Group A ===
Team	Pld	W	D	L	GF	GA	GD	Pts
Brazil	4	4	0	0	37	1	+36	12
Argentina	4	3	0	1	16	5	+11	9
Chile	4	1	1	2	11	20	−9	4
Peru	4	1	1	2	9	20	−11	4
Bolivia	4	0	0	4	6	33	−27	0

=== Group B ===
Team	Pld	W	D	L	GF	GA	GD	Pts
Colombia	4	3	0	1	19	8	+11	9
Paraguay	4	3	0	1	15	9	+6	9
Uruguay	4	2	0	2	13	12	+1	6
Venezuela	4	2	0	2	12	17	−5	6
Ecuador	4	0	0	4	9	22	−13	0

Brazil, Argentina, Colombia & Paraguay qualified.
