= Namibia national futsal team =

Namibia
- Nickname(s): Brave 5
- Association: Namibia Football Association
- Confederation: CAF (Africa)
- Head coach: Marcos Antunes
- Asst coach: Donawald Modise
- Captain: Ken Salote
- Top scorer: Ken Salote (14)
- Home stadium: Windhoek Showgrounds Sport Plaza
- FIFA code: NAM
- FIFA ranking: 135 ▲1 (24 September 2026)

First international
- Namibia 2–5 Tanzania (Windhoek, Namibia; 3 February 2024)

Biggest win
- Namibia 8–4 Kenya (Swakopmund, Namibia; 23 January 2026)

Biggest defeat
- Libya 11–3 Namibia (Swakopmund, Namibia; 4 February 2026)

FIFA World Cup
- Appearances: 0

Futsal Africa Cup of Nations
- Appearances: 1 (First in 2024)
- Best result: Group Stage (2024)

The Namibia national futsal team is controlled by the Namibia Football Association, the governing body for futsal in Namibia, and represents the country in international futsal competitions.

== History ==
After three years of work and the creation of a league system, Futsal Namibia was accepted into the Namibia Football Association in July 2023. At that time, Futsal Namibia founder Andrei Tirtirau announced that the organization was planning to field the nation's first-ever national team. The team entered into 2024 Futsal Africa Cup of Nations qualification and were drawn against Tanzania for a home-and-away series. The home leg, to be played on 3 February 2024, would be Namibia's first-ever match.

Namibia went on to lose its debut by a score of 2–5. Maximillian Boll scored the team's first-ever goal while the second was added by Vilo Lawrence. In the away leg played in Dar es Salam, Namibia earned a surprise 6–3 victory. With the goals scored level at eight, Namibia advanced on away goals and qualified for the 2024 Futsal Africa Cup of Nations. Namibia lost its opening match of the tournament proper to fellow debutantes Mauritania by a score of 4–5. During the tournament, Namibia was managed by the team's first-ever head coach, Ryan Jago, who became the first English coach in AFCON history.

Two years later, Namibia entered qualification for the 2026 Futsal Africa Cup of Nations. Shortly before the competition began, Marcos Antunes of Portugal was named the team's head coach. Previously, Antunes had lead Angola to the silver medal at the 2024 edition of the tournament. Namibia was drawn against Kenya in the first round with the winner advancing to face Libya. Namibia won the first match of the series at home 8–4. The team won the second match 10–7 and advanced to face Libya in the second round of qualification.

== Coaching history ==
- (England) Ryan Jago (2024)
- (Portugal) Marcos Antunes (2026)

== Fixtures and results ==
=== 2026 ===
23 January 2026 2026 Futsal Africa Cup of Nations qualification	Namibia	8–4	Kenya	Swakopmund, Namibia
	Matheus Humphries; Ichshaun von Francois; Wesley Otto; George Haikali; Ken Salote,,,		Mike Ochieng Otieno; Anas Mahad Shiek, Mohamed Hassan Yusuf	Stadium: MTC Dome

28 January 2026 2026 Futsal Africa Cup of Nations qualification	Kenya	7–10	Namibia	Nairobi, Kenya
			Ichshaun Von Francois; Luis Solunga; Celso Roberto; Wesley Otto; Nanguei Kamatuka; Ken Salote; Undefined (o.g.)	Stadium: Kasarani Indoor Arena

4 February 2026 2026 Futsal Africa Cup of Nations qualification	Namibia	3–11	Libya	Swakopmund, Namibia
	Ichshaun von Francois; George Haikali; Luis Solunga		Ali Shoshan; Ibrahim Lemhammel; Fares Bukhshim; Ahmed Ezwai; Mohamed Said; Abdulhakim Rashid; Ahmed Al-Yumni	Stadium: MTC Dome

8 February 2026 2026 Futsal Africa Cup of Nations qualification	Libya	v	Namibia	Benghazi, Libya
				Stadium: Suliman Ad-Dharrath Arena

== Players ==
=== 2026 squad ===
The following players were called up for the 2026 Futsal Africa Cup of Nations.

No.	Pos.	Player	Date of birth (age)	Club
	GK	Riya Usurua	7 April 2004 (age 22)	(Namibia Football Association)
	GK	Rigardo Rooy		(Namibia Football Association)
	DF	Nanguei Kamatuka	3 November 2001 (age 24)	(Namibia Football Association)
	DF	Donald Modise	26 May 1994 (age 32)	(Namibia Football Association)
	MF	Bornface Siyanga	5 August 1995 (age 31)	(Namibia Football Association)
	MF	Celu Tobias		(Namibia Football Association)
	MF	Nigel Prins		(Namibia Football Association)
	MF	Luis Solunga	6 November 2002 (age 23)	(Namibia Football Association)
	MF	Ichshaun von Francois		(Namibia Football Association)
	MF	Wesley Otto		(Namibia Football Association)
	MF	Ichshaun von Francois		(Namibia Football Association)
	MF	George Haikali	22 November 1996 (age 29)	(Namibia Football Association)
	FW	Ken Salote	21 May 2003 (age 23)	(Namibia Football Association)
	FW	Martin Humphries		(Namibia Football Association)
	FW	Celso Roberto		(Namibia Football Association)

=== 2024 squad ===
The following players were called up for the 2024 Futsal Africa Cup of Nations.

No.	Pos.	Player	Date of birth (age)	Club
1	GK	Riya Usurua	7 April 2004 (age 22)	(Namibia Football Association) Ballers
2	DF	Donald Modise	26 May 1994 (age 32)	(Namibia Football Association) Ballers
3	DF	Nanguei Kamatuka	3 November 2001 (age 24)	(Namibia Football Association) Windhoek Futsal
4	MF	Reginald Willemse	29 January 1997 (age 29)	(Namibia Football Association) Selecao
5	DF	Elroi Drotsky	20 May 2003 (age 23)	(Namibia Football Association) Selecao
6	MF	Daniel Dausab	31 July 1996 (age 30)	(Namibia Football Association) Windhoek Futsal
7	FW	Ken Salote	21 May 2003 (age 23)	(Namibia Football Association) Quality
8	MF	Rowen Jager	20 October 2004 (age 22)	(Namibia Football Association) Ballers
9	FW	Remario Mathys	8 January 2005 (age 21)	(Namibia Football Association) Chile
10	MF	George Haikali	22 November 1996 (age 29)	(Namibia Football Association) Ballers
11	FW	Luis Solunga	6 November 2002 (age 23)	(Namibia Football Association) Quality
12	MF	Silas Matheus	6 October 1996 (age 30)	(Namibia Football Association) Patriots
13	MF	Bornface Siyanga	5 August 1995 (age 31)	(Namibia Football Association) Chile
14	GK	Cee-Jay Van Wyk	7 May 1999 (age 27)	(Namibia Football Association) Selecao

== Competitive record ==
FIFA Futsal World Cup record
Year	Round	Pld	W	D	L	GS	GA	DIF
(Netherlands) 1989	Did not enter							
(British Hong Kong) 1992	Did not enter							
(Spain) 1996	Did not enter							
(Guatemala) 2000	Did not enter							
(Chinese Taipei) 2004	Did not enter							
(Brazil) 2008	Did not enter							
2012	Did not enter							
(Colombia) 2016	Did not enter							
(Lithuania) 2021	Did not enter							
(Uzbekistan) 2024	Did not qualify							
Total	0/10	0	0	0	0	0	0	0

=== Africa Futsal Cup of Nations ===
Africa Futsal Cup of Nations record
Year	Round	Pld	W	D	L	GS	GA	DIF
(Egypt) 1996	Did not enter							
(Egypt) 2000	Did not enter							
2004	Did not enter							
(Libya) 2008	Did not enter							
(Burkina Faso) 2011	Did not enter							
(South Africa) 2016	Did not enter							
(Morocco) 2020	Did not enter							
(Morocco) 2024	Group Stage	3	0	0	3	12	26	-14
(Morocco) 2026	TBD							
Total	1/7	3	0	0	3	12	26	-14

=== Head-to-head record ===
As of match played 16 April 2024

Team	Pld	W	D	L	GF	GA	GD	WPCT
Egypt	1	0	0	1	3	10	−7	0.00
Kenya	1	1	0	0	8	4	+4	100.00
Libya	1	0	0	1	5	11	−6	0.00
Mauritania	1	0	0	1	4	5	−1	0.00
Tanzania	2	1	0	1	8	8	0	50.00
Total	6	2	0	4	28	38	−10	33.33

Source: Results
