= Tanzania national futsal team =

Tanzania
- Association: TFF
- Confederation: CAF (Africa)
- Head coach: Curtis Darrel Reid
- Home stadium: Starlight Futsal Arena
- FIFA code: TAN
- FIFA ranking: 137 ▼3 (24 September 2026)

First international
- Namibia 2–5 Tanzania (Windhoek, Namibia; 3 February 2024)

Biggest win
- Namibia 2–5 Tanzania (Windhoek, Namibia; 3 February 2024)

Biggest defeat
- Tanzania 2–14 Netherlands (Jakarta, Indonesia; 21 September 2025)

FIFA World Cup
- Appearances: 0

Futsal Africa Cup of Nations
- Appearances: 0

The Tanzania national futsal team is controlled by the Tanzania Football Federation, the governing body for futsal in Tanzania, and represents the country in international futsal competitions.

== History ==
Tanzania entered into 2024 Futsal Africa Cup of Nations qualification and were drawn against Namibia for a home-and-away series. The away leg, to be played on 3 February 2024, would be Namibia's first-ever match. Tanzania went on to win its debut by a score of 2–5 with David Jangandu scoring his country's first-ever goal. In the away leg played in Dar es Salam, Namibia earned a surprise 6–3 victory. With the goals scored level at eight, Namibia advanced on away goals and qualified for the 2024 Futsal Africa Cup of Nations.

== Competitive record ==
FIFA Futsal World Cup record
| Year | Round | Pld | W | D | L | GS | GA | DIF |
|---|---|---|---|---|---|---|---|---|
| (Netherlands) 1989 | Did not enter | | | | | | | |
| (British Hong Kong) 1992 | Did not enter | | | | | | | |
| (Spain) 1996 | Did not enter | | | | | | | |
| (Guatemala) 2000 | Did not enter | | | | | | | |
| (Chinese Taipei) 2004 | Did not enter | | | | | | | |
| (Brazil) 2008 | Did not enter | | | | | | | |
| 2012 | Did not enter | | | | | | | |
| (Colombia) 2016 | Did not enter | | | | | | | |
| (Lithuania) 2021 | Did not enter | | | | | | | |
| (Uzbekistan) 2024 | Did not qualify | | | | | | | |
| Total | 0/10 | 0 | 0 | 0 | 0 | 0 | 0 | 0 |

=== Africa Futsal Cup of Nations ===
Africa Futsal Cup of Nations record
| Year | Round | Pld | W | D | L | GS | GA | DIF |
|---|---|---|---|---|---|---|---|---|
| (Egypt) 1996 | Did not enter | | | | | | | |
| (Egypt) 2000 | Did not enter | | | | | | | |
| 2004 | Did not enter | | | | | | | |
| (Libya) 2008 | Did not enter | | | | | | | |
| (Burkina Faso) 2011 | Did not enter | | | | | | | |
| (South Africa) 2016 | Did not enter | | | | | | | |
| (Morocco) 2020 | Did not enter | | | | | | | |
| (Morocco) 2024 | Did not qualify | | | | | | | |
| Total | 0/7 | 0 | 0 | 0 | 0 | 0 | 0 | 0 |

=== Head-to-head record ===
As of match played 21 September 2025

Positive Record Neutral Record Negative Record

| Opponent | Pld | W | D | L | GF | GA | GD |
|---|---|---|---|---|---|---|---|
| Indonesia | 1 | 0 | 0 | 1 | 1 | 7 | –6 |
| Latvia | 1 | 0 | 0 | 1 | 0 | 3 | –3 |
| Namibia | 2 | 1 | 0 | 1 | 8 | 8 | 0 |
| Netherlands | 1 | 0 | 0 | 1 | 2 | 14 | –12 |
| Total | 2 | 1 | 0 | 1 | 8 | 8 | 0 |
