= Indomitable Lions =

Indomitable Lions is the name given to most of the national sporting teams of the African nation of Cameroon. These include:

- Cameroon national football team
- Cameroon national futsal team
- Cameroon national rugby league team
- Cameroon national rugby union team
- Cameroon national under-23 football team
