= Vicente Ndongo =

Equatoguinean-Spanish futsal player and YouTuber

Mauro Viñas Pene
- Born: Mauro Ndongo Pene; 22 January 1992 (age 34); Malabo, Equatorial Guinea
- Other names: Mostopapi, Ndg

YouTube information
- Channel: MostoPapiTV
- Years active: 2011–present
- Genre: Video blog
- Subscribers: 1.96 million
- Views: 256 million
Association football career
- Position: Pivot
International career
Years	Team	Apps	(Gls)
2015	Equatorial Guinea Futsal	2	(0)
- Last updated: 22 October 2025

Mauro Pene (born 22 January 1992), sportingly known as Vicente, is an Equatoguinean-Spanish retired futsal player, a former singer of hip hop and rhythm and blues and a current screenwriter and YouTuber who goes under the name Mostopapi. He has played as a pivot for the Equatorial Guinea national futsal team.

== Early life ==
Ndongo was born in Malabo. He moved to Spain at the age of 2. He is based in Bilbao.

== Futsal career ==
Ndongo capped for Equatorial Guinea at senior level during the 2016 Futsal Africa Cup of Nations qualification.
