= Fitzy =

Fitzy may refer to:

- Ryan Fitzgerald, former Big Brother Australia contestant and professional Australian football player
- John "Honey Fitz" Fitzgerald, late politician
- Daniel Fitzgerald (Neighbours), fictional character from the Australian soap opera Neighbours
- Fitzy Fitzgerald, mayor of Dog River in Canadian sitcom Corner Gas, played by Cavan Cunningham
- Constable Lara Fitzgerald, fictional character in Australian soap opera Home and Away
- Simon Fitzgerald (Home and Away), fictional character in Australian soap opera Home and Away
- Fitzpatrick Stadium, a 6,000 seat multi-purpose outdoor stadium in Portland, Maine
- John Fitzgerald (soccer), Canadian soccer player & businessman
- Dylan Fitzgerald-Agricultural Entrepreneur, Owner of Glitzys Grill, Leader of Glitzys Army, Champion of the North, LCA FINAL BOSS, Winner of 2025 conclave
