= Cameroon national futsal team =

Futsal team representing Cameroon

Cameroon
- Nickname(s): Les Lions Indomptables (The Indomitable Lions)
- Association: Cameroonian Football Federation
- Confederation: CAF (Africa)
- FIFA code: CMR
- FIFA ranking: NR (12 December 2025)
- Highest FIFA ranking: 85 (7 December 2015)
- Lowest FIFA ranking: 104 (1 January 2023)
Home colours	Away colours

First international
- Cameroon 3–3 Nigeria (Tripoli, Libya; 22 March 2008)

Biggest win
- no wins

Biggest defeat
- Morocco 8–1 Cameroon (Tripoli, Libya; 25 March 2008); Libya 10–3 Cameroon (Tripoli, Libya; 24 February 2010); Cameroon 5–12 Ukraine (Sabha, Libya; 3 March 2010); Libya 8–1 Cameroon (Sabha, Libya; 4 March 2010)

FIFA World Cup
- Appearances: None

African Futsal Championship
- Appearances: 1 (First in 2008)
- Best result: 1st round (2008)

The Cameroon national futsal team, also known as the Indomitable Lions, (Note: Most of the national sporting teams in Cameroon go by this name, including the Cameroon national rugby league team.) is controlled by the Cameroonian Football Federation, the governing body for futsal in Cameroon and represents the country in international futsal competitions.

== Tournaments ==
=== FIFA Futsal World Cup ===
FIFA World Cup record
Year	Round	Pld	W	D	L	GF	GA
(Netherlands) 1989	Did not enter						
(Hong Kong) 1992	Did not enter						
(Spain) 1996	Did not enter						
(Guatemala) 2000	Did not enter						
(Chinese Taipei) 2004	Did not enter						
(Brazil) 2008	Did not qualify						
(Thailand) 2012	Did not enter						
(Colombia) 2016	Did not qualify						
(Lithuania) 2020	Did not qualify						
(Uzbekistan) 2024	Did not qualify						
Total	1/9	3	0	0	0	5	17

=== African Futsal Championship ===
Africa Cup of Nations record
Year	Round	Pld	W	D	L	GF	GA
(Egypt) 1996	Did not enter						
(Egypt) 2000	Did not enter						
2004	Did not qualify						
(Libya) 2008	First Round	4	0	1	3	6	22
(Burkina Faso) 2011^{1}	Cancelled						
(South Africa) 2016	Did not qualify						
(Morocco) 2020	Did not qualify						
(Morocco) 2024	Did not qualify						
Total	1/7	4	0	1	3	6	22

== Overall Results ==
Active Years: 2008-2015 + 2026

=== Head-to-head record ===
As of 9 February 2026

Opponent	Played	Won	Drawn	Lost	GF	GA	GD
Angola	4	0	0	4	5	31	−26
Jordan	1	0	0	1	1	4	−3
Libya	4	0	0	4	7	31	−24
Morocco	1	0	0	1	1	8	−7
Nigeria	1	0	1	0	3	3	0
Tunisia	1	0	0	1	1	4	−3
Ukraine	1	0	0	1	5	12	−7
Total	13	0	1	12	23	93	−70

=== Results ===
#	Date	Time	Team 1	Score	Team 2	Venue	Tournament
1	22 March 2008	18:00	Cameroon	3–3	Nigeria	Tripoli, Libya	2008 African Futsal Championship
2	23 March 2008	18:00	Cameroon	1–4	Tunisia	Tripoli, Libya	2008 African Futsal Championship
3	24 March 2008	18:00	Cameroon	1–7	Libya	Tripoli, Libya	2008 African Futsal Championship
4	25 March 2008	20:00	Morocco	8–1	Cameroon	Tripoli, Libya	2008 African Futsal Championship
5	22 February 2010		Libya	6–2	Cameroon	Tripoli, Libya	Friendly
–	23 February 2010		Libya B	3–0	Cameroon	Tripoli, Libya	Friendly
6	24 February 2010		Libya	10–3	Cameroon	Tripoli, Libya	Friendly
7	3 March 2010		Ukraine	12–5	Cameroon	Sabha, Libya	2010 Sabha Tournament
8	4 March 2010		Libya	8–1	Cameroon	Sabha, Libya	2010 Sabha Tournament
9	5 March 2010		Jordan	4–1	Cameroon	Sabha, Libya	2010 Sabha Tournament
10	6 December 2015	15:00	Cameroon	3–5	Angola	Yaoundé, Cameroon	2016 Futsal Africa Cup of Nations qualification
11	13 December 2015	16:00	Angola	7–1	Cameroon	Luanda, Angola	2016 Futsal Africa Cup of Nations qualification
12	3 February 2026	17:00	Cameroon	0–12	Angola	Yaoundé, Cameroon	2026 Futsal Africa Cup of Nations qualification
13	9 February 2026	20:00	Angola	7–1	Cameroon	Luanda, Angola	2026 Futsal Africa Cup of Nations qualification
