= Jorge Akapo =

Equatoguinean futsal and football player

Personal information
- Full name: Jorge Ramón Akapo Mambo
- Date of birth: 21 November 1992 (age 33)
- Place of birth: Malabo, Equatorial Guinea
- Height: 1.70 m (5 ft 7 in)
- Position: Defender

Team information
- Current team: Atlético Semu

Senior career*
Years	Team	Apps	(Gls)
- Atlético Semu
2019	Deportivo Unidad		
2019	→ Akonangui (loan)		
2020–202?	Futuro Kings		
202?–	Atlético Semu		

International career^{‡}
2015	Equatorial Guinea (futsal)		
2018–	Equatorial Guinea	1	(0)
- * Club domestic league appearances and goals ‡ National team caps and goals as of 23 January 2018

Jorge Ramón Akapo Mambo (born 21 November 1992) is an Equatorial Guinean footballer and former futsal player who plays as a defender for Atlético Semu and the Equatorial Guinea national team.

== International career ==
Akapo made his international debut for Equatorial Guinea in 2018.

== Personal life ==
Akapo is a cousin of fellow Equatorial Guinean international footballer Carlos Akapo.
