= Keny (futsal player) =

Equatoguinean futsal player

Personal information
- Full name: Kennedy Ofong Ubenga
- Date of birth: 3 August 1981 (age 45)
- Place of birth: Malabo, Equatorial Guinea
- Height: 1.78 m (5 ft 10 in)
- Positions: Winger; defender

Team information
- Current team: Manzanares

Senior career*
Years	Team	Apps	(Gls)
2002–2006	Bargas		
2006–2007	Ocaña		
2007–2009	Guadalajara		
2009	Design Construct Brașov		
2010	Caja Segovia		
2010–2014	AD Sala 10		
2014–2015	Baku United		
2015–2016	Al-Yarmouk		
2016–2017	Bardral Urayasu		
2017–2019	Toulon		
2019–	Manzanares		

International career^{‡}
2015–	Equatorial Guinea	1	(2)
- * Club domestic league appearances and goals ‡ National team caps and goals as of 13 December 2015

Kennedy Ofong Ubenga (born 3 August 1981), known as Keny, is an Equatoguinean futsal player who plays for Manzanares as a winger and the Equatorial Guinea national futsal team. He also holds Spanish citizenship.

He is also the cousin of former footballer, and current football scout Ben Manga.

== International goals ==
Scores and results list Equatorial Guinea's goal tally first

No.	Date	Venue	Opponent	Score	Result	Competition
1	13 December 2015	Polideportivo de Malabo, Malabo, Equatorial Guinea	Zambia	2–0	5–4	2016 Futsal Africa Cup of Nations qualification
2	13 December 2015	Polideportivo de Malabo, Malabo, Equatorial Guinea	Zambia	5–4	5–4	2016 Futsal Africa Cup of Nations qualification

== Honors and awards ==
=== Clubs ===
Baku United

- FA National Futsal League: 2014–15
