= Muller (futsal player) =

Equatoguinean futsal player

Personal information
- Full name: Tomás Manga Angono
- Date of birth: 19 November 1998 (age 27)
- Position: Winger

Team information
- Current team: Leones Vegetarianos

Senior career*
Years	Team	Apps	(Gls)
- Leones Vegetarianos

International career^{‡}
2015–	Equatorial Guinea	2	(2)
- * Club domestic league appearances and goals ‡ National team caps and goals as of 13 December 2015

Tomás Manga Angono (born 19 November 1998), sportingly known as Muller, is an Equatoguinean futsal player who plays as a winger for Leones Vegetarianos FC and the Equatorial Guinea national futsal team.

== International career ==
Muller played for Equatorial Guinea at the 2016 Futsal Africa Cup of Nations qualification and was named for the 2020 Futsal Africa Cup of Nations.

=== International goals ===
Scores and results list Jamaica's goal tally first

No.	Date	Venue	Opponent	Score	Result	Competition
1	6 December 2015	Lusaka, Zambia	Zambia	1–3	2–3	2016 Futsal Africa Cup of Nations qualification
2	13 December 2015	Polideportivo, Malabo, Equatorial Guinea	Zambia	1–0	5-4	2016 Futsal Africa Cup of Nations qualification
