= 2012 FIFA Futsal World Cup qualification (CAF) =

The 2012 FIFA Futsal World Cup qualification for CAF was the qualifiers for Africa to determine the three teams who qualified for the 2012 FIFA Futsal World Cup.

== First round ==
Dates: 6–8 April and 20–22 April 2012

Team 1	Agg.	Team 2	1st leg	2nd leg
Gabon	w/o	Guinea	—	—
Zimbabwe	5–2	Sudan	5–2	—

Winners advances to the second round.

- Note: Guinea withdrew from the competition.
- Note: Sudan requested to CAF to play only one game due to the lack of suitable indoor facilities in the country.

== Second round ==
Dates: 4–6 May and 18–20 May 2012

Team 1	Agg.	Team 2	1st leg	2nd leg
Morocco	w/o	Guinea-Bissau	—	—
Mozambique	4–4 (5–4 p)	Zambia	1–3	3–1
Nigeria	w/o	Gabon	—	—
Tunisia	3–9	Egypt	1–4	2–5
South Africa	5–3	Zimbabwe	4–2	1–1 (in South Africa)
Cameroon	w/o	Libya	—	—

Winners advances to the third round.

- Note: Cameroon, Gabon and Guinea-Bissau withdrew from the competition.

== Third round ==
The six winners from the second round will face off in a home and away format for Africa's three slots at the 2012 FIFA Futsal World Cup in Thailand.

Dates: 8–10 June and 22–24 June 2012

Team 1	Agg.	Team 2	1st leg	2nd leg
Mozambique	6 – 7	Morocco	2 – 6	4 – 1
Egypt	8 – 2	Nigeria	8 – 2	w/o
Libya	10 – 4	South Africa	4 – 0	6 – 4

== Qualified nations ==
1. Egypt
2. Libya
3. Morocco
