= Equatorial Guinea national futsal team =

National futsal team representing Equatorial Guinea

Equatorial Guinea
- Nickname(s): Nzalang Nacional (National Thunder)
- Association: Equatoguinean Football Federation
- Confederation: CAF (Africa)
- Head coach: Gerardo Nchama Ayi Ekong
- Asst coach: Raúl Efa Mbong Mbou
- Captain: Javier Kaba Nzang Esono
- FIFA code: EQG
- FIFA ranking: 64 ▲1 (24 September 2026)
Home colours	Away colours

First international
- Zambia 3–2 Equatorial Guinea (Lusaka, Zambia; 6 December 2015)

Biggest win
- Equatorial Guinea 5–4 Zambia (Malabo, Equatorial Guinea; 13 December 2015)

Biggest defeat
- Zambia 3–2 Equatorial Guinea (Lusaka, Zambia; 6 December 2015)

Africa Futsal Cup of Nations
- Appearances: 1 (First in 2020)
- Best result: Group Stage (2020)

The Equatorial Guinea national futsal team is controlled by the Equatoguinean Football Federation, the governing body for futsal in Equatorial Guinea and represents the country in international futsal competitions.

== Tournaments ==
=== FIFA Futsal World Cup ===
- 1989 to 2012 – Did not enter
- 2016 – Did not qualify
- 2020 – Did not qualify
- 2024 – Did not enter

=== Africa Futsal Cup of Nations ===
- 1996 – Did not enter
- 2000 – Did not enter
- 2004 – Did not enter
- 2008 – Did not enter
- 2011 – Cancelled
- 2016 – Did not qualify
- 2020 – Group stage
- 2024 – Did not enter

== Notable players ==
- Keny, 2015–2020
- Domingo Manami, 2015–2020
- Muller, 2015–2020
- Roberto Tobe, 2015–2020
- Jorge Akapo, 2015
- Vicente Ndongo, 2015
- Bullicio, 2015
