= Rijnhal =

Indoor arena in Arnhem, Netherlands

Coordinates: 51°57′48″N 5°54′04″E

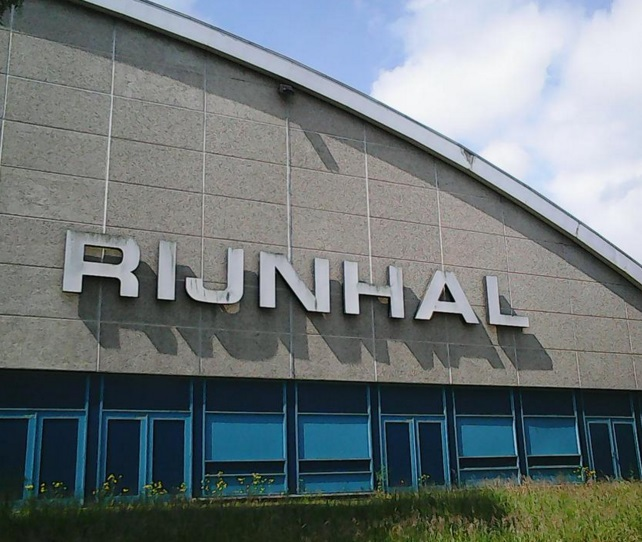
Rijnhal

Rijnhal was a 5,000-capacity indoor arena located in Arnhem, Netherlands. The arena opened in 1972 and is primarily used for sports and concerts. Past notable artists that have performed at Rijnhal include AC/DC, Bon Jovi, Alice Cooper, Scorpions and Aerosmith.

On June 1 2015 the arena closed down as a sports and concerts location. In 2016 after some opposition the building was repurposed as a location for the French sporting goods retailer Decathlon.
