= Adrian Chama =

Zambian footballer (born 1989)

Personal information
- Full name: Adrian Chama
- Date of birth: 18 March 1989 (age 37)
- Place of birth: Mansa, Zambia
- Height: 1.85 m (6 ft 1 in)
- Position: Defender

Team information
- Current team: ZESCO United

Senior career*
Years	Team	Apps	(Gls)
2012–2019	Green Buffaloes	2	(0)
2019–	ZESCO United	8	(0)

International career^{‡}
2014–	Zambia	45	(0)
- * Club domestic league appearances and goals ‡ National team caps and goals as of 14 July 2021

Adrian Chama (born 18 March 1989) is a Zambian footballer who plays for ZESCO United and the Zambia national team.

== International career ==
Chama made his senior international debut on 6 June 2014 in a 4-3 friendly defeat to Japan, coming on as an 88th-minute substitute for Jimmy Chisenga.
