= John Fitzgerald (soccer) =

Canadian soccer player, businessman, and corporate lawyer

Personal information
- Full name: John Kennedy Fitzgerald
- Date of birth: 4 December 1968 (age 57)
- Place of birth: Toronto, Ontario, Canada
- Position: Midfielder

Youth career
- Wexford SC

Senior career*
Years	Team	Apps	(Gls)
1988	North York Rockets	28	(4)
1989–1993	Toronto Blizzard	58+	(10+)

International career^{‡}
1988–1990	Canada	14	(0)
Medal record
Representing Canada
Men's Association football
North American Nations Cup
Winner	1990 Canada
- * Club domestic league appearances and goals as of 22 June 2009 ‡ National team caps and goals as of 22 June 2009

John Kennedy Fitzgerald (born 4 December 1968 in Toronto) is a Canadian former international soccer player. After retiring he became a businessman and corporate lawyer.

== Club career ==
He played for Ontario team Wexford SC from 1987 until 1988, then Toronto Blizzard until 1993. Whilst pursuing his undergraduate degree in Economics at the University of Toronto, he played for the Toronto Varsity Blues where he won a CIAU championship.

== International career ==
Fitzgerald a right-winger, played for Canada at the 1987 Pan American Games and 1987 FIFA World Youth Championship. He made his senior debut for Canada in a February 1988 friendly match against Bermuda, which was in preparation for Canada's 1990 World Cup qualification campaign. He earned a total of 14 senior caps. Fitzgerald also represented Canadian futsal team at the inaugural 1989 FIFA Futsal World Championship where he scored Canada's goal against Argentina.

His final international game was a May 1990 friendly match against Mexico.

== Personal life ==
In addition to studying Economics at the University of Toronto, Fitzgerald also earned a Bachelors of Law degree from the University of Western Ontario Faculty of Law in 1999. Since graduation, Fitzgerald has practiced corporate and securities law, served as general counsel, business consultant, and executive of various online gaming and cryptocurrency businesses, and has been a private equity investor. Fitzgerald is one of the co-founders of Virgin Gaming.

Since 2019, Fitzgerald has served as president and chief executive officer of Cryptologic Corp, a Canadian-based cryptocurrency mining and software development company.

Fitzgerald is also a season ticket holder with the Toronto Raptors of the NBA.

== Honours ==
Canada

- North American Nations Cup: 1990
