= Luis Jara Heyn =

Paraguayan footballer (born 1964)

Luis Ramón Jara Heyn (born 29 December 1964 in Asunción, Paraguay) is a former footballer and futsal player who was a midfielder.

Heyn played association football for most his career in Olimpia Asunción alongside his brother Adolfo for eight years. Heyn also played a few games for the Paraguay national football team during his career, including the U-20 FIFA World Cup of 1985. As a futsal player, he represented the Paraguay national futsal team in the 1989 FIFA Futsal World Cup.
