= Ghana national futsal team =

Ghana
- Nickname(s): Black Stars
- Association: Ghana Football Association
- Confederation: CAF (Africa)
- FIFA code: GHA
- FIFA ranking: 135 ▼1 (8 May 2026)
Home colours	Away colours

First international
- Ghana 19–5 Zaire (Cairo, Egypt; 25 September 1996)

Biggest win
- Ghana 19–5 Zaire (Cairo, Egypt; 25 September 1996)

Biggest defeat
- Morocco 8–3 Ghana (Rabat, Morocco; 13 April 2024)

FIFA World Cup
- Appearances: None

Africa Futsal Cup of Nations
- Appearances: 2 (First in 1996)
- Best result: (silver) 2nd place (1996)

The Ghana national futsal team is controlled by the Ghana Football Association, the governing body for futsal in Ghana and represents the country in international futsal competitions.

== Tournaments ==
=== FIFA Futsal World Cup ===
- 1989 to 1992 – Did not enter
- 1996 – Did not qualify
- 2000 to 2016 – Did not enter
- 2021 to 2024 – Did not qualify

=== Africa Futsal Cup of Nations ===
- 1996 – (silver) Second Place
- 2000 – Did not enter
- 2004 – Did not enter
- 2008 – Did not enter
- 2011 – Cancelled
- 2016 – Did not enter
- 2020 – Did not enter
- 2024 – Group Stage
