= Nigeria national futsal team =

- Nickname(s): Super Eagles
- Association: Nigeria Football Federation
- Confederation: CAF
- FIFA code: NGA
- FIFA ranking: NR (12 December 2025)
Home colours	Away colours

First international
- Argentina 6–2 Nigeria (Hung Hom, Hong Kong; 15 November 1992)

Biggest win
- Nigeria 5–3 Tunisia (African Union, Tripoli, Libya; 25 March 2008)

Biggest defeat
- Egypt 8–2 Nigeria (Cairo, Egypt; 8 June 2012)

FIFA World Cup
- Appearances: 1 (First in 1992)
- Best result: Round 1 (1992)

Africa Futsal Cup of Nations
- Appearances: 1 (First in 2008)
- Best result: Round 1 (2008)

The Nigeria national futsal team represents Nigeria in international futsal competitions and is controlled by the Futsal Commission of the Nigeria Football Federation. Nigeria have played in one edition of the Africa Futsal Cup of Nations after making their debut at the 2008 edition of the tournament where they were eliminated in the first round. Nigeria has also played in the FIFA Futsal World Cup making their debut on the international stage in 1992 where they were eliminated in the group stage after losing all three of their matches (to Argentina, Poland and host country Hong Kong respectively).

== Results ==
Nigeria not active in many years and have only 8 matches in 1992-2026 period:

1. Nigeria 2-6 Argentina 1992 FIFA Futsal World Championship
2. Nigeria 4-5 Poland 1992 FIFA Futsal World Championship
3. Nigeria 1-4 Hong Kong 1992 FIFA Futsal World Championship
4. Nigeria 0-4 Libya 2008 African Futsal Championship
5. Nigeria 3-3 Cameroon 2008 African Futsal Championship
6. Nigeria 1-2 Morocco 2008 African Futsal Championship
7. Nigeria 5-3 Tunisia 2008 African Futsal Championship
8. Nigeria 2-8 Egypt 2012 FIFA Futsal World Cup qualification (CAF)
- 2016 Futsal Africa Cup of Nations qualification WO
- 2012 : 3 matches WO GAB and EGY / 2016: 2 matches WO TUN

=== Overall competitive record ===
As of 5 Feb 2026

M	W	D	L	GF	GA	GD	Win %
Total	8	1	1	6	18	35	12.50

== Tournaments ==
=== FIFA Futsal World Cup ===
- 1989 – Did not enter
- 1992 – Round 1
- 1996 to 2004 – Did not enter
- 2008 to 2012 – Did not qualify
- 2016 – Did not enter
- 2021 – Did not qualify
- 2024 – Did not enter

=== Africa Futsal Cup of Nations ===
- 1996 – Did not enter
- 2000 – Did not enter
- 2004 – Did not enter
- 2008 – Round 1
- 2011 – Cancelled
- 2016 – Did not enter
- 2020 – Did not enter
- 2024 – Did not enter
- 2026 – Did not enter
