= Zimbabwe national futsal team =

Zimbabwe
- Nickname(s): The Warriors
- Association: Zimbabwe Football Association
- Confederation: CAF (Africa)
- Head coach: Phillip Zulu
- FIFA code: ZIM
- FIFA ranking: NR (8 May 2026)
Home colours	Away colours

First international
- Italy 5–1 Zimbabwe (Netherlands; 6 January 1989)

Biggest win
- Zaire 1–9 Zimbabwe (Cairo, Egypt; 29 September 1996)

Biggest defeat
- Ghana 9–2 Zimbabwe (Cairo, Egypt; 27 September 1996)

FIFA World Cup
- Appearances: 1 (First in 1989)
- Best result: First Round (1989)

Africa Futsal Cup of Nations
- Appearances: 1 (First in 1996)
- Best result: (bronze) 3rd place (1996)

The Zimbabwe national futsal team is controlled by the Zimbabwe Football Association, the governing body for futsal in Zimbabwe and represents the country in international futsal competitions.

== Tournaments ==
=== FIFA Futsal World Cup ===
- 1989 – 1st round
- 1992 – Did not enter
- 1996 – Did not qualify
- 2000 – Did not enter
- 2004 – Did not enter
- 2008 – Did not enter
- 2012 – Did not qualify
- 2016 – Did not enter
- 2021 – Did not enter
- 2024 – Did not enter

=== Africa Futsal Cup of Nations ===
- 1996 – (bronze) Third Place
- 2000 – Did not qualify
- 2004 – Did not qualify
- 2008 – Did not qualify
- 2011 – Cancelled
- 2016 – Did not enter
- 2020 – Did not enter
- 2024 – Did not enter
