= 1989 FIFA Futsal World Championship =

FIFA Wereldkampioenschap Futsal 1989

Tournament details
- Host country: Netherlands
- Dates: 5–15 January
- Teams: 16 (from 6 confederations)
- Venue: 5 (in 5 host cities)

Final positions
- Champions: Brazil (1st title)
- Runners-up: Netherlands
- Third place: United States
- Fourth place: Belgium

Tournament statistics
- Matches played: 40
- Goals scored: 221 (5.53 per match)
- Attendance: 86,500 (2,163 per match)
- Top scorer: (Hungary) Laszlo Zsadanyi (7 goals)
- Best player: (Netherlands) Victor Hermans
- Fair play award: United States

The 1989 FIFA Futsal World Championship was the first FIFA Futsal World Championship, the quadrennial international futsal championship contested by the men's national teams of the member associations of FIFA. It was held between 5 and 15 January 1989 in the Netherlands. It was the first non-Olympic FIFA tournament held in the country.

Brazil won the tournament.

== Participants ==
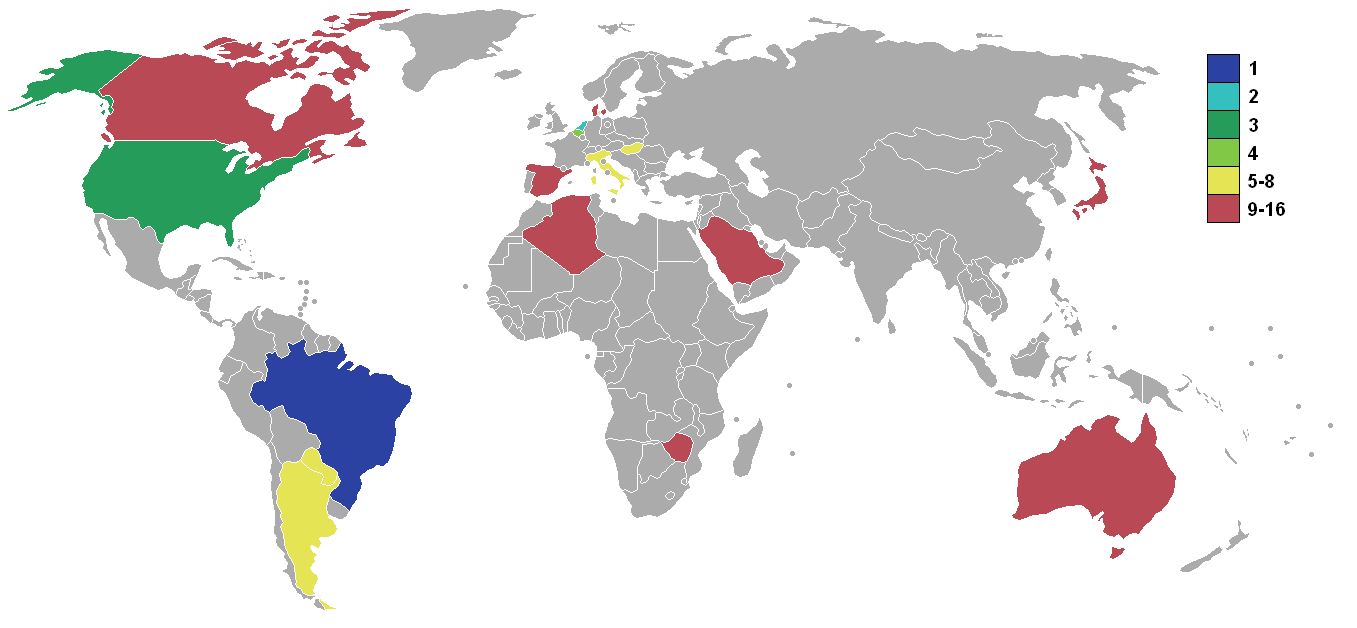
Participants

16 countries were invited to participate to the tournament. 6 from Europe, 3 from South America, 2 from North America, Africa and Asia respectively and 1 from Oceania.

Confederation	Berths	Qualified
Africa	2	Algeria; Zimbabwe
Asia	2	Japan; Saudi Arabia
Europe	6	Belgium; Denmark; Hungary; Italy; Netherlands; Spain
North America	2	Canada; United States
South America	3	Argentina; Brazil; Paraguay
Oceania	1	Australia
TOTAL	16	Field is Finalized

== Venues ==
Holland has many hundreds of sports halls. The KNVB's organizing committee has picked five of the largest and most attractive as the venues for the 1st FIFA World Championship for Five-A-Side Football.

Amsterdam	Arnhem	Leeuwarden	Rotterdam	Den Bosch
Sporthallen Zuid	Rijnhal	Sporthal Kalverdijkje	Rotterdam Ahoy Sportpaleis	Maaspoort Sports and Events
3,500	6,500	4,000	7,000	3,500

== First round ==
=== Group A ===
Team	Pld	W	D	L	GF	GA	GD	Pts
Netherlands	3	2	1	0	10	5	+5	5
Paraguay	3	1	2	0	9	4	+5	4
Denmark	3	1	1	1	12	10	+2	3
Algeria	3	0	0	3	5	17	−12	0

5 January 1989
20:15

Netherlands	4–2	Denmark
Faber 12', 33'; Tielens 40+3'; Hermans 40+10'	Report	Olsen 28'; Joergensen 40' (pen.)

Rotterdam Ahoy Sportpaleis, Rotterdam
Attendance: 6,000
Referee: Hernan Silva Arce (Chile)
5 January 1989
21:30

Paraguay	5–0	Algeria
Alcaraz 8', 20'; Sanchez 11', 40'; Ruiz-Diaz 20'	Report

Rotterdam Ahoy Sportpaleis, Rotterdam
Attendance: 6,000
Referee: Pierre Meysman (Belgium)

7 January 1989
19:30

Denmark	2–2	Paraguay
Olsen 30'; Laudrup 40+3'	Report	Jara 20'; Espineda 32'

Rotterdam Ahoy Sportpaleis, Rotterdam
Attendance: 2,000
Referee: Laszlo Molnar (Hungary)
7 January 1989
21:00

Netherlands	4–1	Algeria
Foree 2'; Seintner 17'; Loosveld 20', 25'	Report	Dahnoune 25'

Rotterdam Ahoy Sportpaleis, Rotterdam
Attendance: 2,000
Referee: Antonio Evangelista (Canada)

8 January 1989
14:30

Denmark	8–4	Algeria
Laudrup 20', 48', 49'; Joergensen 23'; Johansen 32'; Olsen 33', 47'; Moeller Nielsen 45'	Report	Lounici 22', 35', 50'; Belloumi 34'

Sporthallen Zuid, Amsterdam
Attendance: 1,500
Referee: Julio C. Salas (United States)
8 January 1989
14:30

Netherlands	2–2	Paraguay
Seintner 16'; Faber 44'	Report	Sanchez 5'; Jara 30'

Rijnhal, Arnhem
Attendance: 4,000
Referee: Emilio Soriano Aladren (Spain)

=== Group B ===
Team	Pld	W	D	L	GF	GA	GD	Pts
Brazil	3	2	0	1	14	4	+10	4
Hungary	3	2	0	1	17	9	+8	4
Spain	3	2	0	1	14	9	+5	4
Saudi Arabia	3	0	0	3	4	27	−23	0

6 January 1989
19:15

Hungary	3–2	Brazil
Borostyan 18'; Rozsa 34'; Zsadanyi 39'	Report	Toca 9'; Átila 13'

Sporthal Kalverdijkje, Leeuwarden
Attendance: 4,000
Referee: Alexis Ponnet (Belgium)
6 January 1989
20:30

Saudi Arabia	2–8	Spain
Al-Temyat 5'; Abu Humoud 20'	Report	Valencia 4', 7'; Bonilla 10'; González 16'; Armora 18', 31'; Ferre 29', 35'

Sporthal Kalverdijkje, Leeuwarden
Attendance: 4,000
Referee: Luigi Agnolin (Italy)

7 January 1989
19:30

Brazil	8–0	Saudi Arabia
Raul 8'; Toca 11', 29'; Gilson 15'; Benatti 37', 50'; Átila 44'; Neimar 48'	Report

Maaspoort Sports and Events, 's-Hertogenbosch
Attendance: 2,000
Referee: William N. M. Crombie (Scotland)
7 January 1989
20:00

Hungary	3–5	Spain
Zsadanyi 13'; Mozner 36'; Rozsa 46'	Report	Valencia 15'; Armora 24'; Iglesias 35', 40'; Navarro 45'

Maaspoort Sports and Events, 's-Hertogenbosch
Attendance: 2,000
Referee: Christiaan Van der Laar (Netherlands)

8 January 1989
14:30

Hungary	11–2	Saudi Arabia
Zsadanyi 1', 7', 14', 41' (pen.), 46'; Borostyan 3', 6', 12'; Olajos 13'; Qiriko 31', 44'	Report	Al-Behair 34'; Al-Temyat 39'

Sporthal Kalverdijkje, Leeuwarden
Attendance: 1,000
Referee: Abel Gnecco (Argentina)
8 January 1989
14:30

Brazil	4–1	Spain
Raul 15'; Benatti 18'; Marquinhos 33', 42'	Report	Bonilla 29'

Maaspoort Sports and Events, 's-Hertogenbosch
Attendance: 3,100
Referee: Juan Francisco Escobar (Paraguay)

=== Group C ===
Team	Pld	W	D	L	GF	GA	GD	Pts
Belgium	3	3	0	0	8	1	+7	6
Argentina	3	2	0	1	6	5	+1	4
Canada	3	1	0	2	7	7	0	2
Japan	3	0	0	3	3	11	−8	0

6 January 1989
19:45

Japan	0–3	Belgium
	Report	Janssen 20'; Schreurs 27'; Papanicolaou 42'

Maaspoort Sports and Events, 's-Hertogenbosch
Attendance: 200
Referee: Juan Francisco Escobar (Paraguay)
6 January 1989
21:00

Canada	1–3	Argentina
Fitzgerald 42'	Report	Hidalgo 8', 49'; Lozano 16'

Maaspoort Sports and Events, 's-Hertogenbosch
Attendance: 1,200
Referee: J. Oortman (Netherlands)

7 January 1989
18:00

Belgium	2–0	Canada
Maes 7'; Schreurs 22'	Report

Sporthal Kalverdijkje, Leeuwarden
Attendance: 1,500
Referee: Hernan Silva Arce (Chile)
7 January 1989
19:15

Japan	1–2	Argentina
Yato 39'	Report	Hidalgo 7' (pen.); Lozano 19'

Sporthal Kalverdijkje, Leeuwarden
Attendance: 1,500
Referee: J. Andreu Dubon (Spain)

8 January 1989
15:45

Japan	2–6	Canada
Kitazawa 12', 28'	Report	Ianiero 1'; Nocita 18'; Fitzgerald 31'; Berdusco 41'; Sarantopoulos 43'; Bunbury 48'

Sporthal Kalverdijkje, Leeuwarden
Attendance: 1,000
Referee: Pierluigi Pairetto (Italy)
8 January 1989
15:45

Belgium	3–1	Argentina
Schreurs 12'; Fostier 38'; Beyers 50'	Report	Alvarez 35'

Maaspoort Sports and Events, 's-Hertogenbosch
Attendance: 3,100
Referee: William N. M. Crombie (Scotland)

=== Group D ===
Team	Pld	W	D	L	GF	GA	GD	Pts
United States	3	2	1	0	10	3	+7	5
Italy	3	2	0	1	12	6	+6	4
Australia	3	1	1	1	6	8	−2	3
Zimbabwe	3	0	0	3	3	14	−11	0

6 January 1989
19:30

Italy	5–1	Zimbabwe
Albanesi 8'; Famà 20', 30'; de Simoni 25'; Albani 27'	Report	Kambani 44'

Sporthallen Zuid, Amsterdam
Attendance: 1,500
Referee: T. Van der Meer (Netherlands)
6 January 1989
21:00

United States	1–1	Australia
Eichmann 33' (pen.)	Report	Crino 50'

Sporthallen Zuid, Amsterdam
Attendance: 1,500
Referee: Emilio Soriano Aladren (Spain)

7 January 1989
19:30

Zimbabwe	1–5	United States
Munemo 39'	Report	Murray 7'; Vermes 22', 46'; Windischmann 25' (pen.); Ramos 28'

Rijnhal, Arnhem
Attendance: 500
Referee: Kim Milton Nielsen (Denmark)
7 January 1989
20:45

Italy	6–1	Australia
Albani 9' (pen.), 29'; Famà 15'; Minicucci 20'; Albanesi 33'; Roma 49'	Report	Crino 28' (pen.)

Rijnhal, Arnhem
Attendance: 500
Referee: Romualdo Arppi Filho (Brazil)

8 January 1989
15:45

Zimbabwe	1–4	Australia
Munemo 50'	Report	Trimboli 25', 49'; Odžakov 46'; Davidson 47'

Sporthallen Zuid, Amsterdam
Attendance: 1,500
Referee: Alexis Ponnet (Belgium)
8 January 1989
15:45

Italy	1–4	United States
Filippini 44'	Report	Lachowecki 13'; Gabarra 21', 40' (pen.); Goulet 49'

Rijnhal, Arnhem
Attendance: 4,000
Referee: Christiaan Van der Laar (Netherlands)

== Second round ==
=== Group A ===
Team	Pld	W	D	L	GF	GA	GD	Pts
Belgium	3	2	1	0	9	4	+5	5
Netherlands	3	1	1	1	8	6	+2	3
Hungary	3	0	2	1	6	8	−2	2
Italy	3	1	0	2	5	10	−5	2

10 January 1989
19:45

Netherlands	3–3	Hungary
Bakker 1'; Hermans 1', 7'	Report	Rozsa 6'; Borostyan 29'; Qiriko 43'

Rotterdam Ahoy Sportpaleis, Rotterdam
Attendance: 2,000
Referee: William N. M. Crombie (Scotland)
10 January 1989
21:00

Belgium	5–1	Italy
Fostier 4', 43'; Beyers 11'; Papanicolaou 28', 49'	Report	Famà 15'

Rijnhal, Arnhem
Attendance: 1,000
Referee: Emilio Soriano Aladren (Spain)

11 January 1989
19:45

Hungary	2–2	Belgium
Rozsa 28', 39'	Report	Maes 4'; Hernalsteen 40'

Rotterdam Ahoy Sportpaleis, Rotterdam
Attendance: 800
Referee: Romualdo Arppi Filho (Brazil)
11 January 1989
21:00

Netherlands	4–1	Italy
Hermans 21'; Bakker 24'; Demandt 38'; Loosveld 49'	Report	Minicucci 2'

Rijnhal, Arnhem
Attendance: 1,700
Referee: Juan Francisco Escobar (Paraguay)

12 January 1989
21:00

Netherlands	1–2	Belgium
Loosveld 7'	Report	Schreurs 6', 26'

Rijnhal, Arnhem
Attendance: 3,000
Referee: William N. M. Crombie (Scotland)
12 January 1989
21:00

Hungary	1–3	Italy
Borostyan 6'	Report	Roma 7'; Albani 18'; Famà 27'

Rotterdam Ahoy Sportpaleis, Rotterdam
Attendance: 1,000
Referee: Hernan Silva Arce (Chile)

=== Group B ===
Team	Pld	W	D	L	GF	GA	GD	Pts
United States	3	3	0	0	10	4	+6	6
Brazil	3	2	0	1	14	9	+5	4
Paraguay	3	1	0	2	5	10	−5	2
Argentina	3	0	0	3	7	13	−6	0

10 January 1989
19:45

Brazil	5–1	Paraguay
Átila 10', 20+5'; Benatti 14'; Neimar 40'; Adílio 40+10'	Report	Jara 35'

Rijnhal, Arnhem
Attendance: 500
Referee: Kim Milton Nielsen (Denmark)
10 January 1989
21:00

United States	3–1	Argentina
Vermes 33'; Ramos 44'; Visnyei 40+6'	Report	Ávalos 8'

Rotterdam Ahoy Sportpaleis, Rotterdam
Attendance: 2,000
Referee: Luigi Agnolin (Italy)

11 January 1989
19:45

Paraguay	0–2	United States
	Report	Vermes 7'; Gabarra 50'

Rijnhal, Arnhem
Attendance: 1,700
Referee: Hernan Silva Arce (Chile)
11 January 1989
21:00

Brazil	6–3	Argentina
Toca 7', 42'; Marquinhos 13'; Adílio 36'; Carlos Alberto 44'; Dirceu 47'	Report	Castaneira 39'; Hidalgo 45' (pen.); Valarin 50' (pen.)

Rotterdam Ahoy Sportpaleis, Rotterdam
Attendance: 1,000
Referee: Alexis Ponnet (Belgium)

12 January 1989
21:00

Brazil	3–5	United States
Raul 39' (pen.); Dirceu 47'; Neimar 48'	Report	Lawson 7'; Ramos 15'; Gabarra 27'; Goulet 40'; Eichmann 46'

Rotterdam Ahoy Sportpaleis, Rotterdam
Attendance: 1,000
Referee: Antonio Evangelista (Canada)
12 January 1989
21:00

Paraguay	4–3	Argentina
Flor 14'; López 26'; Sanchez 35'; Ruiz-Diaz 39'	Report	Avalos 18', 23', 30'

Rijnhal, Arnhem
Attendance: 3,000
Referee: J. Oortman (Netherlands)

== Final round ==
Semifinals
14 January 1989 – Rotterdam
Belgium	3 (3)
Brazil (p)	3 (5)
14 January 1989 – Rotterdam
United States	1
Netherlands	2

Final
15 January 1989 – Rotterdam
Brazil	2
Netherlands	1
Third place
15 January 1989 – Rotterdam
Belgium	2
United States (a.e.t.)	3

=== Semi-finals ===
14 January 1989
19:45

Belgium	3–3 (a.e.t.)	Brazil
Reul 16'; Schreurs 54'; Maes 57'	Report	Raul 41'; Cadinho 53'; Benatti 56'
Penalties
Beyers (penalty scored); Papanicolaou (penalty scored); Lamotte (penalty scored); Schreurs (penalty missed)	3–5	(penalty scored) Raul; (penalty scored) Marquinhos; (penalty scored) Benatti; (penalty scored) Carlos Alberto; (penalty scored) Serginho

Rotterdam Ahoy Sportpaleis, Rotterdam
Attendance: 2,500
Referee: Laszlo Molnar (Hungary)

14 January 1989
21:00

United States	1–2	Netherlands
Gabarra 33'	Report	Hermans 23', 26'

Rotterdam Ahoy Sportpaleis, Rotterdam
Attendance: 2,500
Referee: Emilio Soriano Aladren (Spain)

=== 3rd place ===
15 January 1989
14:00

Belgium	2–3 (a.e.t.)	United States
Maes 15', 25'	Report	Vermes 59'; Windischmann 43'

Rotterdam Ahoy Sportpaleis, Rotterdam
Attendance: 3,000
Referee: Hernan Silva Arce (Chile)

=== Final ===
15 January 1989
15:30

Brazil	2–1	Netherlands
Benatti 10'; Raul 46'	Report	Loosveld 43'

Rotterdam Ahoy Sportpaleis, Rotterdam
Attendance: 4,500
Referee: William N. M. Crombie (Scotland)

== Champions ==
FIFA Futsal World Championships 1989 winners

Brazil
First title

== Awards ==
Golden Ball winner
(Netherlands) Victor Hermans
Golden Shoe winner
(Hungary) Laszlo Zsadanyi
Silver Shoe winner
(Brazil) Benatti
Bronze Shoe winner
(Belgium) Rudi Schreurs
(Hungary) Mihaly Borostyan
(Netherlands) Victor Hermans
FIFA Fair Play Trophy
United States

== Goalscorers ==
7 goals

- (Hungary) Laszlo Zsadanyi

6 goals

- (Belgium) Rudi Schreurs
- (Brazil) Benatti
- (Hungary) Mihaly Borostyan
- (Netherlands) Victor Hermans
- (United States) Peter Vermes

5 goals

- (Belgium) Eric Maes
- (Brazil) Raul
- (Brazil) Toca
- (Hungary) Laszlo Rozsa
- (Italy) Andrea Famà
- (Netherlands) Marcel Loosveld
- (United States) Jim Gabarra

4 goals

- (Argentina) Juan Ávalos
- (Argentina) Nicolas Hidalgo
- (Brazil) Átila
- (Denmark) Brian Laudrup
- (Denmark) Lars Olsen
- (Italy) Raoul Albani
- (Paraguay) Jose Sanchez

3 goals

- (Algeria) Khaled Lounici
- (Belgium) Alain Fostier
- (Belgium) Nico Papanicolaou
- (Brazil) Marquinhos
- (Brazil) Neimar
- (Netherlands) Mario Faber
- (Spain) Daniel Armora
- (Spain) Domingo Valencia
- (United States) Tab Ramos

2 goals

- (Argentina) Fernando Lozano
- (Australia) Oscar Crino
- (Australia) Paul Trimboli
- (Brazil) Adílio
- (Brazil) Dirceu
- (Canada) John Fitzgerald
- (Denmark) Kurt Joergensen
- (Hungary) Sandor Olajos
- (Hungary) Laszlo Qiriko
- (Italy) Franco Albanesi
- (Italy) Paolo Minicucci
- (Italy) Giovanni Roma
- (Japan) Tsuyoshi Kitazawa
- (Netherlands) Andre Bakker
- (Netherlands) Michel Seintner
- (Paraguay) Francisco Alcaraz
- (Paraguay) Luis Jara
- (Paraguay) Mario Ruiz-Diaz
- (Saudi Arabia) Safouk Al-Temyat
- (Spain) Sergio Bonilla
- (Spain) Antonio Ferre
- (Spain) José Iglesias
- (United States) Eric Eichmann
- (United States) Brent Goulet
- (United States) Mike Windischmann
- (Zimbabwe) Clayton Munemo
- (Belgium) Herman Beyers

1 goal

- (Algeria) Lakhdar Belloumi
- (Algeria) Abderrahmane Dahnoune
- (Argentina) Ramon Alvarez
- (Argentina) Hugo Castaneira
- (Argentina) Gabriel Valarin
- (Australia) Alan Davidson
- (Australia) Žarko Odžakov
- (Belgium) Raf Hernalsteen
- (Belgium) Karel Janssen
- (Belgium) Luc Reul
- (Brazil) Cadinho
- (Brazil) Carlos Alberto
- (Brazil) Gilson
- (Canada) Eddy Berdusco
- (Canada) Alex Bunbury
- (Canada) Tony Nocita
- (Canada) Peter Sarantopoulos
- (Denmark) Torben Johansen
- (Denmark) Ole Moeller Nielsen
- (Hungary) Janos Mozner
- (Italy) Paolo de Simoni
- (Italy) Alfredo Filippini
- (Japan) Toshinori Yato
- (Netherlands) Eduard Demandt
- (Netherlands) Jeffrey Foree
- (Netherlands) Andre Tielens
- (Paraguay) Adolfo Jara
- (Paraguay) Omar Espineda
- (Paraguay) Luis Flor
- (Paraguay) Víctor López
- (Saudi Arabia) Khaled Al-Behair
- (Saudi Arabia) Abdullah Abu Humoud
- (Spain) Mario Gonzalez
- (Spain) Carlos Navarro
- (United States) A.J. Lachowecki
- (United States) Doc Lawson
- (United States) Bruce Murray
- (United States) Gyula Visnyei
- (Zimbabwe) Antony Kambani

== Tournament ranking ==
Per statistical convention in football, matches decided in extra time are counted as wins and losses, while matches decided by penalty shoot-out are counted as draws.

Pos	Team	Pld	W	D	L	GF	GA	GD	Pts	Final result
1	Brazil	8	5	1	2	33	17	+16	11	Champions
2	Netherlands	8	4	2	2	21	14	+7	10	Runners-up
3	United States	8	6	1	1	24	11	+13	13	Third place
4	Belgium	8	5	2	1	22	11	+11	12	Fourth place
5	Hungary	6	2	2	2	23	17	+6	6	Eliminated in Second round
6	Italy	6	3	0	3	17	16	+1	6	Eliminated in Second round
7	Paraguay	6	2	2	2	14	14	0	6	Eliminated in Second round
8	Argentina	6	2	0	4	13	18	–5	4	Eliminated in Second round
9	Spain	3	2	0	1	14	9	+5	4	Eliminated in First round
10	Denmark	3	1	1	1	12	10	+2	3	Eliminated in First round
11	Australia	3	1	1	1	6	8	–2	3	Eliminated in First round
12	Canada	3	1	0	2	7	7	0	2	Eliminated in First round
13	Japan	3	0	0	3	3	11	–8	0	Eliminated in First round
14	Zimbabwe	3	0	0	3	3	14	–11	0	Eliminated in First round
15	Algeria	3	0	0	3	5	17	–12	0	Eliminated in First round
16	Saudi Arabia	3	0	0	3	4	27	–23	0	Eliminated in First round
