= 2011 African Futsal Championship =

Tournament details
- Host country: Burkina Faso
- Dates: 3–17 April
- Teams: none (from 1 confederation)

The 2011 African Futsal Championship was the fifth edition of this tournament which took place on 3–17 April 2011 in Burkina Faso, but the tournament was ultimately cancelled.

== Qualified nations ==
Burkina Faso was an automatic qualifier as the host country. Libya also received an automatic berth for winning the previous edition.

Country	Qualified as	Previous appearance
Burkina Faso	Host	none
Libya	Winner of 2008 edition	2 (2000 & 2008)

== Draw ==
The draw was scheduled to take place on 9 October 2010 but was postponed till further notice.

The Confederation of African Football announced that the 2011 Futsal Championship has been cancelled. Burkina Faso withdrew from hosting the event which was meant to start at the beginning of April and a replacement could not be found therefore the championship wasn't held.

A separate qualifying tournament was organized for qualification to the 2012 FIFA Futsal World Cup.
