= 1996 African Futsal Championship =

Tournament details
- Host country: Egypt
- Dates: 25–30 September 1996
- Teams: 5 (from 5 associations)
- Venue: (in 1 host city)

Final positions
- Champions: Egypt (1st title)
- Runners-up: Ghana
- Third place: Zimbabwe
- Fourth place: Somalia

Tournament statistics
- Matches played: 10
- Goals scored: 113 (11.3 per match)

The 1996 African Futsal Championship took place in Cairo, Egypt from 25 to 30 September 1996. The tournament served as a qualifying tournament for the 1996 FIFA Futsal World Cup in Spain.

== Standings ==
Pos	Team	Pld	W	D	L	GF	GA	GD	Pts	Qualification
1	Egypt (H, C)	4	3	1	0	31	12	+19	10	Qualified for 1996 FIFA Futsal World Championship
2	Ghana	4	3	0	1	42	9	+33	9	
3	Zimbabwe	4	2	1	1	21	16	+5	7	
4	Somalia	4	0	1	3	5	31	−26	1	
5	Zaire	4	0	1	3	14	45	−31	1	

Source: RSSSF
(C) Champions; (H) Hosts

== Matches ==
25 September 1996

Zimbabwe	6–6	Egypt
	Report

25 September 1996

Ghana	19–5	Zaire
	Report

26 September 1996

Egypt	2–1	Ghana
	Report

26 September 1996

Somalia	4–4	Zaire
	Report

27 September 1996

Egypt	10–1	Somalia
	Report

27 September 1996

Ghana	9–2	Zimbabwe
	Report

29 September 1996

Ghana	13–0	Somalia
	Report

29 September 1996

Zimbabwe	9–1	Zaire
	Report

30 September 1996

Egypt	13–4	Zaire
	Report

30 September 1996

Zimbabwe	4–0	Somalia
	Report
