= 2008 African Futsal Championship =

Tournament details
- Host country: Libya
- Dates: 21–31 March
- Teams: 10 (from 1 confederation)
- Venues: 2 (in 1 host city)

Final positions
- Champions: Libya (1st title)
- Runners-up: Egypt
- Third place: Morocco
- Fourth place: Mozambique

Tournament statistics
- Matches played: 24
- Goals scored: 177 (7.38 per match)
- Best player: (Libya) Mohammed Shahout
- All statistics correct as of 25 December 2008.

The 2008 African Futsal Championship took place in Tripoli, Libya from 21 March to 30 March 2008. The tournament served as a qualifying tournament for the 2008 FIFA Futsal World Cup in Brazil.

The tournament was contested by ten teams, split into two groups of five. Group A was contested of hosts Libya, along with Cameroon, Morocco, Nigeria and Tunisia, while Group 2 consisted of Angola, Egypt, Mozambique, South Africa and Zambia. The matches were played at two venues in Tripoli: Cortuba and African Union.

== Group 1 ==
| Team | Pld | W | D | L | GF | GA | GD | Pts | Qualification |
|---|---|---|---|---|---|---|---|---|---|
| Libya | 4 | 4 | 0 | 0 | 19 | 4 | +15 | 12 | Advanced to the semi-finals |
| Morocco | 4 | 3 | 0 | 1 | 16 | 6 | +10 | 9 | Advanced to the semi-finals |
| Nigeria | 4 | 1 | 1 | 2 | 9 | 12 | −3 | 4 | Eliminated and missed out on the 2008 FIFA Futsal World Cup |
| Tunisia | 4 | 1 | 0 | 3 | 9 | 15 | −6 | 3 | Eliminated and missed out on the 2008 FIFA Futsal World Cup |
| Cameroon | 4 | 0 | 1 | 3 | 6 | 22 | −16 | 1 | Eliminated and missed out on the 2008 FIFA Futsal World Cup |

Matches

| Match No. | Date | Time | Team 1 | Score | Team 2 | Venue | Match Report |
|---|---|---|---|---|---|---|---|
| 2 | 2008-03-21 | 14:00 | Tunisia | 0 – 5 | Morocco | Cortuba | Match Report |
| 4 | 2008-03-21 | 20:30 | Libya | 4 – 0 | Nigeria | African Union | Match Report |
| 5 | 2008-03-22 | 18:00 | Cameroon | 3 – 3 | Nigeria | African Union | Match Report |
| 7 | 2008-03-22 | 20:00 | Libya | 4 – 2 | Tunisia | African Union | Match Report |
| 9 | 2008-03-23 | 18:00 | Cameroon | 1 – 4 | Tunisia | African Union | Match Report |
| 11 | 2008-03-23 | 20:00 | Libya | 4 – 1 | Morocco | African Union | Match Report |
| 15 | 2008-03-24 | 18:00 | Cameroon | 1 – 7 | Libya | African Union | Match Report |
| 16 | 2008-03-24 | 20:00 | Morocco | 2 – 1 | Nigeria | Cortuba | Match Report |
| 17 | 2008-03-25 | 18:00 | Nigeria | 5 – 3 | Tunisia | Cortuba | Match Report |
| 18 | 2008-03-25 | 20:00 | Morocco | 8 – 1 | Cameroon | African Union | Match Report |

== Group 2 ==
| Team | Pld | W | D | L | GF | GA | GD | Pts | Qualification |
|---|---|---|---|---|---|---|---|---|---|
| Egypt | 4 | 2 | 2 | 0 | 20 | 7 | +13 | 8 | Advanced to the semi-finals |
| Mozambique | 4 | 2 | 1 | 1 | 25 | 12 | +13 | 7 | Advanced to the semi-finals |
| Angola | 4 | 2 | 1 | 1 | 20 | 19 | +1 | 7 | Eliminated and missed out on the 2008 FIFA Futsal World Cup |
| Zambia | 4 | 1 | 0 | 3 | 15 | 28 | −13 | 3 | Eliminated and missed out on the 2008 FIFA Futsal World Cup |
| South Africa | 4 | 1 | 0 | 3 | 17 | 31 | −14 | 3 | Eliminated and missed out on the 2008 FIFA Futsal World Cup |

Matches

| Match No. | Date | Time | Team 1 | Score | Team 2 | Venue | Match Report |
|---|---|---|---|---|---|---|---|
| 1 | 2008-03-21 | 12:00 | South Africa | 4 – 8 | Angola | Cortuba | Match Report |
| 3 | 2008-03-21 | 16:00 | Egypt | 9 – 0 | Zambia | Cortuba | Match Report |
| 6 | 2008-03-22 | 18:00 | Egypt | 8 – 4 | South Africa | Cortuba | Match Report |
| 8 | 2008-03-22 | 20:00 | Mozambique | 9 – 2 | Zambia | Cortuba | Match Report |
| 10 | 2008-03-23 | 18:00 | Angola | 2 – 2 | Egypt | Cortuba | Match Report |
| 12 | 2008-03-23 | 20:00 | South Africa | 3 – 10 | Mozambique | Cortuba | Match Report |
| 13 | 2008-03-24 | 18:00 | Egypt | 1 – 1 | Mozambique | Cortuba | Match Report |
| 14 | 2008-03-24 | 20:00 | Zambia | 8 – 4 | Angola | African Union | Match Report |
| 19 | 2008-03-25 | 18:00 | Zambia | 5 – 6 | South Africa | Cortuba | Match Report |
| 20 | 2008-03-25 | 20:00 | Angola | 6 – 5 | Mozambique | African Union | Match Report |

== Semi-finals ==
| Match No. | Date | Time | Team 1 | Score | Team 2 | Venue | Match Report |
|---|---|---|---|---|---|---|---|
| 21 | 2008-03-28 | 17:00 | Egypt | 4 – 1 | Morocco | African Union | Match Report |
| 22 | 2008-03-28 | 19:30 | Libya | 4 – 1 | Mozambique | African Union | Match Report |

== 3rd Place ==
2008-03-30
17:00

| Morocco | 3 – 1 (a.e.t.) | Mozambique |
|---|---|---|
| | Match Report |

African Union

== Final ==
2008-03-31
19:30

| Egypt | 3 – 4 (a.e.t.) | Libya |
|---|---|---|
| | Match Report |

African Union

== Honors ==
2008 African Futsal Championship

Libya
1st title

=== Final standings ===
1. Libya (Qualified to 2008 World Cup)
2. Egypt (Qualified to 2008 World Cup)
3. Morocco
4. Mozambique

=== Best players ===
- Best Player: (Libya) Mohammed Shahout
- Best Goalkeeper: (Libya) Mohammed Ali Al-Sharif
