= 2010–11 Iranian Futsal Super League =

Iranian Futsal Super League
- Season: 2010–11
- Champions: Shahid Mansouri
- Relegated: Arash Beton; Poushineh Baft
- 2011 AFC Futsal Club Championship: Shahid Mansouri
- Matches: 144
- Goals: 846 (5.88 per match)
- Top goalscorer: 24 Goals; Masoud Daneshvar
- Biggest home win: Kish Air 12-1 Arash Beton
- Biggest away win: Arash Beton 0-7 Giti Pasand
- Highest scoring: Kish Air 12-1 Arash Beton; Shahid Mansouri 11-2 Persepolis

The 2010–11 Iranian Futsal Super League will be the 12th season of the Iran Pro League and the 7th under the name Futsal Super League. Foolad Mahan are the defending champions.

== Teams ==
Locations of clubs in 2010–11 Iranian Futsal Super League

| Team | City | Venue | Capacity | Head coach | Team captain | Past Season |
|---|---|---|---|---|---|---|
| Arash Beton | Qazvin | Shahid Babaei | 2,500 | (Iran) Amir Abbas Siahpoush | – | Promoted |
| Labaniyat Arjan | Shiraz | Shahid Abolfathi | – | (Iran) Vahid Nematollahi | – | 10th |
| Dabiri | Tabriz | Oloum Pezeshki | 2,000 | (Iran) Babak Masoumi | (Iran) Kazem Mohammadi | Replaced for Petroshimi |
| Elmo Adab | Mashhad | Shahid Beheshti | 6,000 | (Iran) Hamid Shandizi Moghaddam | (Iran) Hamid Shandizi Moghaddam | 7th |
| Firooz Sofeh | Isfahan | Pirouzi | 4,300 | (Iran) Alireza Afzal | (Iran) Mehrdad Jaberi | 8th |
| Foolad Gostar | Tabriz | Shahid Pour Sharifi | 6,000 | (Iran) Mahmoud Khorakchi | (Iran) Farrokh Shahrara | 6th |
| Foolad Mahan | Isfahan | Pirouzi | 4,300 | (Iran) Hossein Afzali | (Iran) Vahid Shamsaei | Champion |
| Giti Pasand | Isfahan | Pirouzi | 4,300 | (Iran) Seyed Mehdi Abtahi | (Iran) Mostafa Nazari | Replaced for Sadra |
| Kish Air | Qom | Karegaran | 1,000 | (Iran) Vahid Ghiasi | (Iran) Hossein Sabouri | Replaced for Eram Kish |
| Melli Haffari | Ahvaz | Naft | 1,000 | (Iran) Mohammad Reza Davoudinejad | – | 3rd |
| Persepolis | Tehran | Khorshid | – | (Iran) Mohammad Reza Heidarian | (Iran) Mohammad Reza Heidarian | Promoted |
| Rah | Sari | Sayed Rasoul Hosseini | 5,000 | (Iran) Mostafa Azari | (Iran) Mahmoud Lotfi | 9th |
| Shahid Mansouri | Qarchak | 7th Tir | 3,000 | (Iran) Reza Lak Aliabadi | (Iran) Hamid Nassiri | 2nd |

== Managerial changes ==
| Team | Outgoing head coach | Manner of departure | Date of vacancy | Position in table | Incoming head coach | Date of appointment | Position in table |
|---|---|---|---|---|---|---|---|
| Rah | (Iran) Mehdi Nemati | Resigned | 12 August 2010 | 2 | (Iran) Mostafa Azari | 25 August 2010 | 9 |
| Arash Beton | (Iran) Amir Abbas Siahpoush | Sacked | 10 September 2010 | 13 | (Iran) Mojtaba Moradi | 21 September 2010 | 13 |
| Giti Pasand | (Iran) Hossein Afzali | Resigned | 21 September 2010 | 1 | (Iran) Mohammad Nazemasharieh | 21 September 2010 | 2 |
| Foolad Mahan | (Iran) Mehdi Abtahi | Sacked | 23 September 2010 | 5 | (Iran) Hossein Afzali | 23 September 2010 | 3 |
| Arash Beton | (Iran) Mojtaba Moradi | Resigned | 13 October 2010 | 13 | (Iran) Amir Abbas Siahpoush | 22 October 2010 | 13 |
| Dabiri | (Iran) Nasser Rahnama | Sacked | | 11 | (Iran) Babak Masoumi | | 12 |
| Kish Air | (Iran) Reza Kordi | Resigned | 30 November 2010 | 10 | (Iran) Vahid Ghiasi | 30 November 2010 | 10 |
| Giti Pasand | (Iran) Mohammad Nazemasharieh | Sacked | 21 December 2010 | 2 | (Iran) Mehdi Abtahi | 21 December 2010 | 2 |

== League standings ==
| Pos | Team | Pld | W | D | L | GF | GA | GD | Pts | Qualification or relegation |
|---|---|---|---|---|---|---|---|---|---|---|
| 1 | Shahid Mansouri (C) | 23 | 15 | 5 | 3 | 101 | 54 | +47 | 50 | Qualification for the AFC Futsal Club Championship |
| 2 | Giti Pasand | 23 | 13 | 7 | 3 | 83 | 54 | +29 | 46 | |
| 3 | Foolad Mahan | 23 | 13 | 6 | 4 | 85 | 57 | +28 | 45 | |
| 4 | Firooz Sofeh | 23 | 11 | 6 | 6 | 73 | 66 | +7 | 39 | |
| 5 | Gostaresh Foolad | 23 | 11 | 4 | 8 | 61 | 51 | +10 | 37 | |
| 6 | Labaniyat Arjan | 23 | 11 | 3 | 9 | 74 | 65 | +9 | 36 | |
| 7 | Elmo Adab | 23 | 10 | 3 | 10 | 59 | 58 | +1 | 33 | |
| 8 | Melli Haffari | 23 | 8 | 4 | 11 | 63 | 68 | −5 | 28 | |
| 9 | Rah | 23 | 9 | 0 | 14 | 58 | 79 | −21 | 27 | |
| 10 | Kish Air | 23 | 7 | 4 | 12 | 70 | 68 | +2 | 25 | |
| 11 | Dabiri | 23 | 5 | 4 | 14 | 54 | 76 | −22 | 19 | |
| 12 | Persepolis | 23 | 6 | 3 | 14 | 51 | 67 | −16 | 18 (Note: Persepolis had 3 points deducted.) | |
| 13 | Arash Beton (R) | 12 | 0 | 1 | 11 | 15 | 74 | −59 | 1 (Note: Arash Beton withdrew from the league after the half season.) | Relegation to the 1st Division |
| 14 | Poushineh Baft (R) | 0 | 0 | 0 | 0 | 0 | 0 | 0 | 0 (Note: Poushineh Baft withdrew from the league before the beginning.) | Relegation to the 1st Division |

Updated to match(es) played on 11 January 2022. Source: Futsal Planet
Rules for classification: 1) points; 2) goal difference; 3) number of goals scored.
(C) Champions; (R) Relegated

== Positions by round ==
| Team ╲ Round | 1 | 2 | 3 | 4 | 5 | 6 | 7 | 8 | 9 | 10 | 11 | 12 | 13 | 14 | 15 | 16 | 17 | 18 | 19 | 20 | 21 | 22 | 23 | 24 | 25 | 26 |
|---|---|---|---|---|---|---|---|---|---|---|---|---|---|---|---|---|---|---|---|---|---|---|---|---|---|---|
| Shahid Mansouri | 7 | 4 | 2 | 3 | 3 | 3 | 4 | 4 | 5 | 5 | 3 | 2 | 1 | 1 | 1 | 1 | 1 | 1 | 1 | 1 | 1 | 2 | 2 | 1 | 1 | 1 |
| Giti Pasand | 8 | 3 | 1 | 1 | 2 | 1 | 1 | 1 | 2 | 4 | 2 | 3 | 2 | 2 | 2 | 2 | 2 | 2 | 2 | 2 | 3 | 3 | 3 | 3 | 2 | 2 |
| Foolad Mahan | 5 | 8 | 9 | 7 | 9 | 5 | 6 | 5 | 3 | 1 | 1 | 1 | 3 | 3 | 3 | 3 | 3 | 3 | 3 | 3 | 2 | 1 | 1 | 2 | 3 | 3 |
| Firooz Sofeh | 6 | 9 | 8 | 9 | 8 | 8 | 9 | 8 | 8 | 8 | 6 | 6 | 4 | 4 | 6 | 6 | 6 | 6 | 6 | 4 | 4 | 4 | 5 | 6 | 5 | 4 |
| Gostaresh Foolad | 3 | 2 | 5 | 4 | 4 | 6 | 3 | 3 | 1 | 2 | 4 | 4 | 6 | 5 | 4 | 4 | 4 | 4 | 5 | 6 | 6 | 5 | 4 | 4 | 4 | 5 |
| Labaniyat Arjan | 4 | 7 | 11 | 11 | 10 | 9 | 8 | 7 | 7 | 6 | 7 | 7 | 5 | 6 | 5 | 5 | 5 | 5 | 4 | 5 | 5 | 6 | 6 | 5 | 6 | 6 |
| Elmo Adab | 1 | 5 | 7 | 5 | 6 | 10 | 11 | 10 | 9 | 10 | 9 | 8 | 9 | 9 | 8 | 8 | 9 | 8 | 7 | 7 | 7 | 7 | 8 | 7 | 7 | 7 |
| Melli Haffari | 9 | 10 | 6 | 8 | 5 | 7 | 5 | 6 | 6 | 7 | 8 | 9 | 8 | 8 | 7 | 7 | 8 | 9 | 9 | 9 | 8 | 8 | 7 | 8 | 8 | 8 |
| Rah | 2 | 1 | 3 | 2 | 1 | 2 | 2 | 2 | 4 | 3 | 5 | 5 | 7 | 7 | 9 | 9 | 7 | 7 | 8 | 10 | 9 | 9 | 9 | 9 | 9 | 9 |
| Kish Air | 11 | 12 | 13 | 12 | 12 | 11 | 10 | 11 | 11 | 9 | 11 | 11 | 10 | 10 | 10 | 10 | 11 | 11 | 10 | 8 | 10 | 10 | 10 | 10 | 10 | 10 |
| Dabiri | 12 | 11 | 10 | 10 | 11 | 12 | 12 | 12 | 12 | 12 | 10 | 10 | 11 | 11 | 11 | 11 | 10 | 10 | 11 | 12 | 12 | 12 | 12 | 11 | 11 | 11 |
| Persepolis | 10 | 6 | 5 | 6 | 7 | 4 | 7 | 9 | 10 | 11 | 12 | 12 | 12 | 12 | 12 | 12 | 12 | 12 | 12 | 11 | 11 | 11 | 11 | 12 | 12 | 12 |
| Arash Beton | 13 | 13 | 12 | 13 | 13 | 13 | 13 | 13 | 13 | 13 | 13 | 13 | 13 | 13 | 13 | 13 | 13 | 13 | 13 | 13 | 13 | 13 | 13 | 13 | 13 | 13 |

| Leader / 2011 AFC Futsal Club Championship |
| Relegation to the 2011–12 Iran Futsal's 1st Division |

Source: Cups (in Persian)

== Results table ==
| Home \ Away | ARS | ARJ | DAB | ELM | FSO | GFT | MAH | SGP | AIR | HFR | PRS | RAS | MAN |
|---|---|---|---|---|---|---|---|---|---|---|---|---|---|
| Arash Beton | | 1–5 | 1–4 | | 2–2 | | 2–6 | 0–7 | | | | 0–4 | |
| Labaniyat Arjan | | | 5–1 | 5–1 | 4–3 | 3–2 | 3–4 | 4–3 | 3–2 | 3–2 | 2–1 | 1–0 | 2–4 |
| Dabiri | | 4–4 | | 2–2 | 0–2 | 0–1 | 1–5 | 3–2 | 3–5 | 6–3 | 4–3 | 6–1 | 2–3 |
| Elmo Adab | 6–0 | 3–2 | 5–2 | | 1–1 | 3–2 | 1–2 | 2–4 | 1–4 | 4–2 | 3–1 | 2–1 | 2–0 |
| Firooz Sofeh | | 7–3 | 1–5 | 3–2 | | 2–2 | 4–3 | 3–3 | 6–5 | 1–1 | 5–4 | 5–2 | 2–7 |
| Gostaresh Foolad | 8–2 | 2–1 | 3–1 | 1–0 | 2–3 | | 1–1 | 5–4 | 3–4 | 5–4 | 4–1 | 5–2 | 1–4 |
| Foolad Mahan | | 2–2 | 2–1 | 8–4 | 3–3 | 1–2 | | 2–2 | 6–4 | 7–1 | 2–4 | 6–2 | 4–4 |
| Giti Pasand | | 2–0 | 6–5 | 6–4 | 4–2 | 3–3 | 5–5 | | 2–0 | 3–3 | 4–1 | 4–2 | 1–1 |
| Kish Air | 12–1 | 5–3 | 6–1 | 2–2 | 3–4 | 1–1 | 1–2 | 1–5 | | 2–3 | 0–0 | 4–2 | 2–2 |
| Melli Haffari | 10–1 | 4–3 | 1–1 | 1–3 | 2–0 | 3–2 | 0–3 (Note: Melli Haffari received a technical loss of 3–0 to Foolad Mahan.) | 3–4 | 6–3 | | 2–1 | 2–4 | 4–3 |
| Persepolis | 5–4 | 4–4 | 2–2 | 1–3 | 2–3 | 1–2 | 6–2 | 0–1 | 2–0 | 2–1 | | 3–2 | 1–6 |
| Rah | | 3–4 | 4–3 | 4–3 | 4–3 | 3–2 | 1–5 | 2–5 | 4–2 | 3–1 | 5–4 | | 1–2 |
| Shahid Mansouri | 5–1 | 5–3 | 5–1 | 3–2 | 7–4 | 4–2 | 4–5 | 4–4 | 6–2 | 4–4 | 11–2 | 7–2 | |

Updated to match(es) played on 11 January 2022. Source: Cups.ir
Legend: Blue = home team win; Yellow = draw; Red = away team win.

== Clubs season-progress ==
| Team ╲ Round | 1 | 2 | 3 | 4 | 5 | 6 | 7 | 8 | 9 | 10 | 11 | 12 | 13 | 14 | 15 | 16 | 17 | 18 | 19 | 20 | 21 | 22 | 23 | 24 | 25 | 26 |
|---|---|---|---|---|---|---|---|---|---|---|---|---|---|---|---|---|---|---|---|---|---|---|---|---|---|---|
| Arash Beton | L | B | D | L | L | L | L | L | L | L | L | L | L | W/O | W/O | W/O | W/O | W/O | W/O | W/O | W/O | W/O | W/O | W/O | W/O | W/O |
| Labaniyat Arjan | W | L | L | L | W | D | B | W | W | B | L | W | W | D | W | L | W | L | W | L | L | B | B | W | L | W |
| Dabiri | L | L | W | L | L | D | L | D | L | W | W | B | L | L | W | D | W | L | L | L | L | L | L | B | B | L |
| Elmo Adab | W | L | B | W | L | L | L | D | W | L | W | W | L | B | W | B | L | D | D | W | W | L | L | W | W | L |
| Firooz Sofeh | D | D | D | B | W | D | L | W | D | L | W | W | W | W | L | B | B | D | W | W | W | L | W | L | W | W |
| Gostaresh Foolad | W | D | L | W | B | D | W | W | W | D | L | L | D | W | W | W | B | B | L | L | L | W | W | L | W | L |
| Foolad Mahan | D | D | W | L | D | W | B | W | W | W | W | W | B | L | L | W | L | D | D | W | W | W | W | W | B | B |
| Giti Pasand | D | W | W | W | D | D | W | B | D | D | W | W | W | D | L | W | L | D | W | B | B | W | L | W | W | W |
| Kish Air | L | L | L | D | L | W | W | L | L | W | B | L | D | L | D | L | L | W | D | W | L | L | B | B | L | W |
| Melli Haffari | B | D | W | L | W | D | W | L | W | L | L | L | W | B | W | L | L | L | L | D | W | W | L | W/O | L | B |
| Persepolis | L | W | L | W | L | W | B | L | L | L | L | L | L | D | D | D | W | W | B | B | L | L | W | L | L | L |
| Rah | W | W | L | W | W | B | W | L | L | W | L | L | L | W | L | L | W | B | B | L | W | W | L | L | L | L |
| Shahid Mansouri | D | W | W | D | W | L | L | W | B | W | W | W | W | D | L | W | W | W | D | D | B | B | L | W | W | W |

Source: Cups.ir
W = Win; D = Draw; L = Lose; B = Bye; W/O = Withdrew

== Top goalscorers ==
| Position | Player | Club | Goals |
|---|---|---|---|
| 1 | (Iran) Masoud Daneshvar | Giti Pasand | 24 |
| 2 | (Iran) Ghodrat Bahadori | Firooz Sofeh | 23 |
| 3 | (Iran) Mohammad Taheri | Foolad Mahan | 22 |
| 4 | (Iran) Shahram Sharifzadeh | Foolad Gostar | 21 |
| 5 | (Iran) Mohammad Reza Zahmatkesh | Giti Pasand | 18 |
| 5 | (Iran) Morteza Azimaei | Shahid Mansouri | 18 |
| 7 | (Iran) Mahmoud Lotfi | Rah | 17 |
| 7 | (Iran) Ali Rahnama | Shahid Mansouri | 17 |
| 7 | (Iran) Ahmad Esmaeilpour | Shahid Mansouri | 17 |
| 7 | (Iran) Hamid Shojaei | Labaniyat Arjan | 17 |
| 11 | (Iran) Saeid Taghizadeh | Kish Air | 15 |
| 12 | 2 players | | 14 |
| 14 | 5 players | | 13 |
| 19 | 4 players | | 12 |
| 23 | 8 players | | 11 |
| 31 | 7 players | | 10 |
| 38 | 3 players | | 9 |
| 41 | 2 players | | 8 |
| 43 | 5 players | | 7 |
| 48 | 10 players | | 6 |
| 58 | 9 players | | 5 |
| 67 | 11 players | | 4 |
| 78 | 11 players | | 3 |
| 89 | 24 players | | 2 |
| 113 | 23 players | | 1 |
| _ | 4 players | | OG |
| _ | 1 technical loses of 3–0 | | 3 |
| Total goals (Including technical loses) | | | 846 |
| Total games | | | 144 |
| Average per game | | | 5.88 |

Last updated: 17 February 2011

== Awards ==
Iranian Futsal Super League
2010–11 champions
Shahid Mansouri
First title

- Winner: Shahid Mansouri
- Runners-up: Giti Pasand
- Third-Place: Foolad Mahan
- Top scorer: (Iran) Masoud Daneshvar (Giti Pasand) (24)

== See also ==
- 2010–11 Futsal 1st Division
- 2011 Futsal 2nd Division
- 2010–11 Persian Gulf Cup
- 2010–11 Azadegan League
- 2010–11 Iran Football's 2nd Division
- 2010–11 Iran Football's 3rd Division
- 2010–11 Hazfi Cup
- Iranian Super Cup
