= Vahid Shafiei =

Iranian futsal player

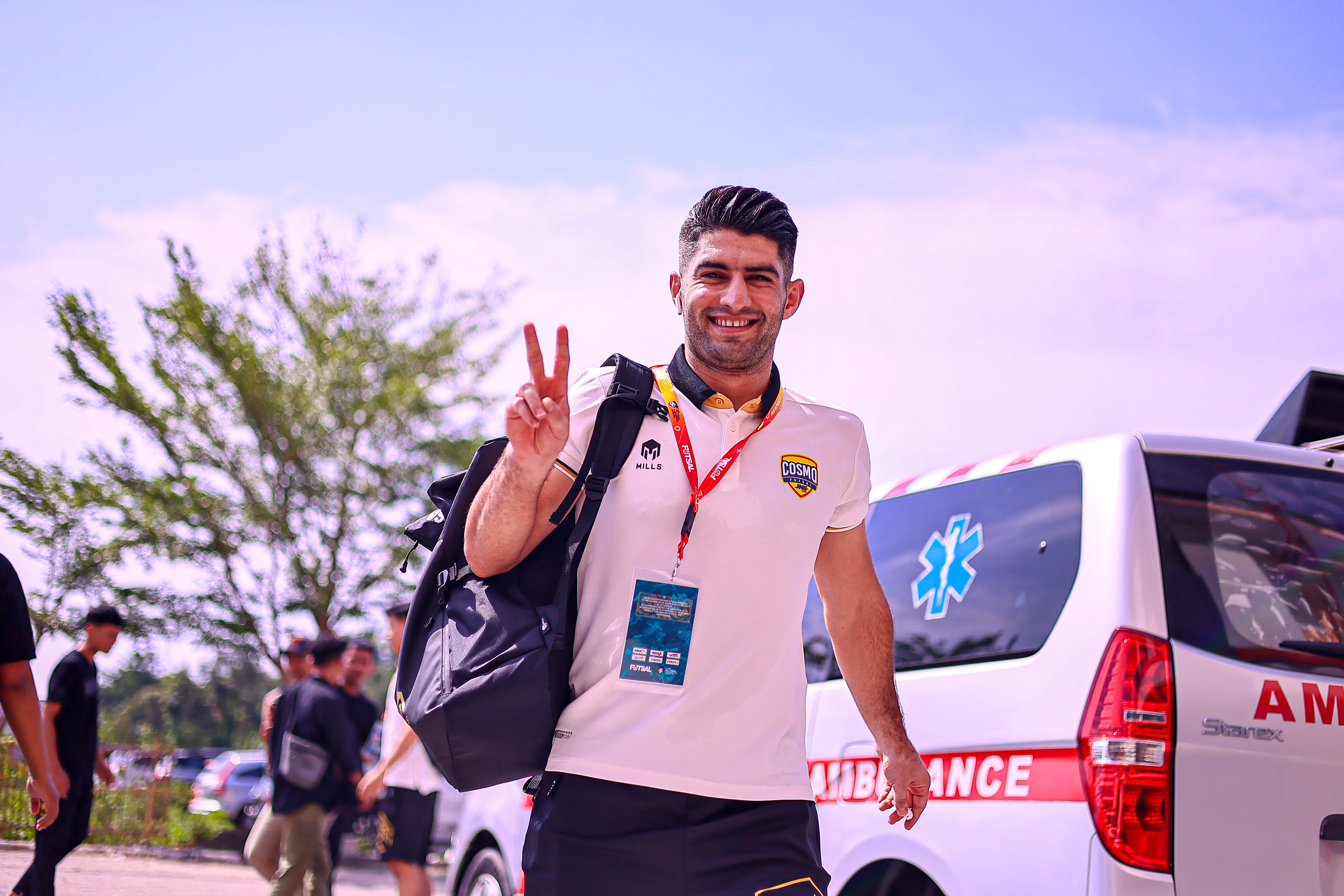

Personal information
- Date of birth: 29 September 1992 (age 34)
- Place of birth: Qazvin, Iran
- Height: 1.79 m (5 ft 10 in)
- Position: Defender

Team information
- Current team: Cosmo FC
- Number: 17

Senior career*
| Years | Team | Apps | (Gls) |
| 2011–2014 | Shahrdari Tabriz | | |
| 2014–2015 | Dabiri | | (5) |
| 2015–2017 | Moghavemat Alborz | | (8) |
| 2017 | Shahrdari Saveh | | (7) |
| 2017–2018 | Shenzhen Nanling | | |
| 2018–2019 | Sunich | | (6) |
| 2019 | Araz Naxçivan | | |
| 2019–2020 | Cosmo FC | | |
| 2020–2021 | Giti Pasand | | (4) |
| 2021– | Cosmo FC | | |

International career^{‡}
- Iran U23
| 2013–2015 | Iran | | (21) |
| 2019 | Azerbaijan | 3 | (0) |
- * Club domestic league appearances and goals as of 19 December 2021 ‡ National team caps and goals as of 19 December 2021

Vahid Shafiei (Persian: وحید شفیعی; born 29 September 1992) is an Iranian futsal player. He is a Defender, and currently a member of Cosmo FC in the Indonesia Pro Futsal League.

== Honours ==
=== Country ===
- AFC Futsal Championship
  - Runners-up (1): 2014
- Asian Indoor and Martial Arts Games
  - Champion (1): 2013

=== Club ===
- AFC Futsal Club Championship
  - Third place (1): 2014 (Dabiri)
- Chinese Futsal League
  - Champions (1): 2017–18 (Shenzhen Nanling)
- Iran Futsal's 1st Division
  - Champions (1): 2011–12 (Shahrdari Tabriz)

== International goals ==
| # | Date | Venue | Opponent | Score | Result | Competition |
|---|---|---|---|---|---|---|
| 1 | 13 June 2013 | (China) Zhejiang Dragon Sports Centre, Hangzhou | Russia | 1 – 0 | 5 – 1 | Friendly |
| 2 | 13 June 2013 | (China) Zhejiang Dragon Sports Centre, Hangzhou | Russia | 3 – 0 | 5 – 1 | Friendly |
| 3 | 14 June 2013 | (China) Zhejiang Dragon Sports Centre, Hangzhou | Netherlands | ? – ? | 4 – 3 | Friendly |
| 4 | 14 June 2013 | (China) Zhejiang Dragon Sports Centre, Hangzhou | Netherlands | ? – ? | 4 – 3 | Friendly |
| 5 | 15 June 2013 | (China) Zhejiang Dragon Sports Centre, Hangzhou | China | ? – ? | 5 – 2 | Friendly |
| 6 | 1 July 2013 | (South Korea) Songdo Global University Campus, Incheon | Iraq | 3 – 1 | 12 – 3 | 2013 Asian Indoor-Martial Arts Games |
| 7 | 1 July 2013 | (South Korea) Songdo Global University Campus, Incheon | Iraq | 4 – 1 | 12 – 3 | 2013 Asian Indoor-Martial Arts Games |
| 8 | 6 July 2013 | (South Korea) Songdo Global University Campus, Incheon | Japan | 5 – 2 | 5 – 2 | 2013 Asian Indoor-Martial Arts Games |
| - | 19 October 2013 | Sao Keatano, Brazil | (Brazil) Bank | 3 – 0 | 3 – 0 | Unofficial Friendly |
| 9 | 21 October 2013 | Maringa's Futsal Stadium, Brazil | Guatemala | ? – ? | 7 – 0 | Friendly |
| 10 | 23 October 2013 | (Brazil) Ginásio Chico Neto, Maringá | Argentina | 2 – 1 | 2 – 2 | 2013 Grand Prix de Futsal |
| 11 | 19 April 2014 | Uzbekistan Sports Center, Tashkent | Uzbekistan | 4 – 1 | 6 – 1 | Friendly |
| 12 | 19 April 2014 | Uzbekistan Sports Center, Tashkent | Uzbekistan | 5 – 1 | 6 – 1 | Friendly |
| - | 22 April 2014 | (Russia) , Moscow | (Russia) MFK Norilsk Nickel | 1 – 1 | 1 – 1 | Unofficial Friendly |
| - | 29 April 2014 | (Vietnam) Ho Chi Minh City | South Korea | ? – ? | 5 - 0 | Unofficial Friendly |
| 13 | 30 April 2014 | (Vietnam) Ton Duc Thang University Gymnasium, Ho Chi Minh City | Indonesia | 5 – 1 | 5 – 1 | 2014 AFC Futsal Championship |
| 14 | 2 May 2014 | (Vietnam) Ton Duc Thang University Gymnasium, Ho Chi Minh City | China | 5 – 0 | 12 – 0 | 2014 AFC Futsal Championship |
| 15 | 2 May 2014 | (Vietnam) Ton Duc Thang University Gymnasium, Ho Chi Minh City | China | 10 – 0 | 12 – 0 | 2014 AFC Futsal Championship |
| 16 | 4 May 2014 | (Vietnam) Phu Tho Gymnasium, Ho Chi Minh City | Australia | 6 – 1 | 8 – 1 | 2014 AFC Futsal Championship |
| 17 | 7 May 2014 | (Vietnam) Phu Tho Gymnasium, Ho Chi Minh City | Vietnam | 2 – 0 | 15 – 4 | 2014 AFC Futsal Championship |
| 18 | 8 May 2014 | (Vietnam) Phu Tho Gymnasium, Ho Chi Minh City | Uzbekistan | 5 – 0 | 10 – 0 | 2014 AFC Futsal Championship |
| 19 | 8 May 2014 | (Vietnam) Phu Tho Gymnasium, Ho Chi Minh City | Uzbekistan | 6 – 0 | 10 – 0 | 2014 AFC Futsal Championship |
| 20 | 8 May 2014 | (Vietnam) Phu Tho Gymnasium, Ho Chi Minh City | Uzbekistan | 10 – 0 | 10 – 0 | 2014 AFC Futsal Championship |
| 21 | 6 January 2015 | (Croatia) GŠSD, Pazin | Croatia | 1 – 0 | 4 – 1 | Friendly |
