= Profile Zali Mashhad FSC =

Iranian futsal club

Profile Zali Mashhad FSC پروفیل زالی مشهد
- Full name: Profile Zali Mashhad Futsal Club
- Short name: Profile Zali
- Founded: 12 November 2011
- Ground: Fayaz Bakhsh Arena; Mashhad
- Chairman: (Iran) Alireza Eslami
- Head Coach: (Iran) Hossein Eslami
- League: Iran Futsal's 1st Division
- 2011-12: 4th

Profile Zali Futsal Club (Persian: باشگاه فوتسال پروفیل زالی مشهد) is an Iranian futsal club based in Mashhad, Iran.They currently compete in the Iran Futsal's 1st Division, the 2nd tier of Iranian futsal.

== History ==
=== Establishment ===
The club was originally known as Etemad Iranian, competing in the Iran Futsal's 1st Division in the 2011-12 season with bought Farsh Ara licence. In the 2012–13 season it was renamed Profile Zali Mashhad due to change of sponsorship.

== Season-by-season ==
The table below chronicles the achievements of the Club in various competitions.

Season	League	Position	Notes
2011-12	1 Div	4th / Group A
2012-13	1 Div	3rd / Group A
