= Milad Tonekabon FSC =

Iranian futsal club

Milad Tonekabon
- Full name: Milad Tonekabon Futsal Club
- Dissolved: 2013
- Ground: , Tonekabon

Milad Tonekabon Futsal Club (Persian: باشگاه فوتسال میلاد تنکابن was an Iranian futsal club based in Tonekabon.

== Season-by-season ==
The table below chronicles the achievements of the Club in various competitions.

Season	League	Position	Notes
2001–02	Premier League
2002–03	Premier League
2003–04	Super League	12th	Relegation to Play Off
2004–05	1st Division
2006–07	1st Division
2007 ~ 2009	??
2009	2nd Division
2010	2nd Division
2011	2nd Division	11th/Group A	Relegation

== Famous players ==
- (Iran) Javad Asghari Moghaddam
- (Iran) Saeid Ahmadabbasi
- (Iran) Moslem Rostamiha
