= Esteghlal Novin Mahshahr FSC =

Iranian futsal club

- Full name: Esteghlal Novin Mahshahr Futsal Club
- Founded: October 31, 2010; 6 years ago
- Ground: Besat Arena, Mahshahr
- League: Iran Futsal's 1st Division
- 2016–17: 8th/Group A
- Website: http://hoomansazan.blogfa.com/

Esteghlal Novin Mahshahr Futsal Club (Persian: باشگاه فوتسال استقلال نوین ماهشهر) is an Iranian futsal club based in Mahshahr.

== Establishment ==
The club was originally known as Homan Saz Khozestan jonob, since the 2010 season. In the half season of 2012–13 Iran Futsal's 1st Division it was renamed Petroshimi Maron due to change of sponsorship. This season placed 8th in table and Relegatian to the 2nd Division. In 2013 they bought the right to play in Super League from Gaz Khozestan and renamed to Amaliyat Qeyr Sanati. This season placed 14th in table and Relegatian to the 1st Division. In the 2014–15 Iran Futsal's 1st Division it was renamed Esteghlal Novin Mahshahr due to change of sponsorship.

== Current squad 2012 ==
Note: Flags indicate national team as defined under FIFA eligibility rules; some limited exceptions apply. Players may hold more than one non-FIFA nationality.

No.	Pos.	Nation	Player
—		(Iran) IRN	Hossein Radmehr
—		(Iran) IRN	Farhad Khojasteh
—		(Iran) IRN	Shahin Niyayesh
—		(Iran) IRN	Hamed Mollaali
—		(Iran) IRN	Mehrdad Ghaderi
—		(Iran) IRN	Mehdi Heydari
—		(Iran) IRN	Shahram Sheyda
—		(Iran) IRN	Iman Ahangar
—		(Iran) IRN	Mohammad Mosalla

No.	Pos.	Nation	Player
—		(Iran) IRN	Ashkan Kaebi
—		(Iran) IRN	Ezat Mohammad Zadeh
—		(Iran) IRN	Hamid Bakhtiyari
—		(Iran) IRN	Mohammad Mortezaei
—		(Iran) IRN	Mohammad Askari
—		(Iran) IRN	Saeid Asakereh
—		(Iran) IRN	Reza Ghanavaati
—		(Iran) IRN	Mojtaba Rashedizadeh
—		(Iran) IRN	Malek Savari

== Season-by-season ==
The table below chronicles the achievements of the Club in various competitions.

Season	League	Position	Hazfi	Notes
2011	2nd Division	2nd/Group B		Promoted
2011-12	1st Division	6th/Group B
2012-13	1st Division	8th/Group A		Relegation
2013-14	Super League	14th	Withdrew	Relegation
2014-15	1st Division	6th/Group Persian Gulf
2015-16	1st Division	6th/Group A
2016-17	1st Division	8th/Group A		Relegation

== Honours ==
National:

- Iranian Futsal 2nd Division
  - Champions (1): 2010
