= 2009–10 Iranian Futsal Super League =

Futsal Super League
- Season: 2009–10
- Champions: Foolad Mahan
- Relegated: Shahr Aftab; Heyat Football
- AFC Futsal Club Championship: Foolad Mahan
- Matches played: 181
- Goals scored: 1,175 (6.49 per match)
- Top goalscorer: 34 Goals; Vahid Shamsaei
- Biggest home win: Melli Haffari 9-0 Heyat Football
- Biggest away win: Heyat Football 1-8 Foolad Mahan
- Highest scoring: Shahid Mansouri 8-9 Melli Haffari

The following is the standings of the 2009–10 Futsal Super League season. Foolad Mahan are the defending champions.

== Play-off ==
After the Tam Iran Khodro withdrew from league, Football Association decided to hold a playoff game between the two teams that lost Promoted play-off in the 2008–09 1st Division.

July 23, 2009
17:00

Bonyad Maskan	2 - 7	Petroshimi
	Report

7th Tir Arena, Qarchak

== League standings ==
Pos	Team	Pld	W	D	L	GF	GA	GD	Pts	Qualification or relegation
1	Foolad Mahan (C)	26	20	5	1	116	56	+60	65	Qualification for the AFC Futsal Club Championship
2	Shahid Mansouri	26	16	6	4	112	66	+46	54	
3	Melli Haffari	26	16	0	10	113	92	+21	48	
4	Petroshimi	26	11	8	7	87	72	+15	41	
5	Sadra	26	11	7	8	70	63	+7	40	
6	Gostaresh Foolad	26	11	6	9	78	72	+6	39	
7	Elmo Adab	26	10	7	9	77	77	0	37	
8	Firooz Sofeh	26	11	4	11	69	76	−7	37	
9	Rah	26	9	6	11	82	88	−6	33	
10	Labaniyat Arjan	26	6	8	12	78	98	−20	26	
11	Poushineh Baft	26	8	2	16	76	97	−21	26	
12	Eram Kish	26	7	5	14	67	92	−25	26	
13	Shahr Aftab (R)	26	6	6	14	80	105	−25	24	Relegation to the 1st Division
14	Heyat Football (R)	26	4	2	20	73	124	−51	14	Relegation to the 1st Division

Updated to match(es) played on 25 February 2010. Source: Cups.ir
Rules for classification: 1) points; 2) goal difference; 3) number of goals scored.
(C) Champions; (R) Relegated

== Results table ==
Home \ Away	ARJ	ELM	ERM	FSO	GFT	MAH	KER	HFR	PET	BAF	RAS	SAD	MAN	AFT
Labaniyat Arjan		4–1	5–1	3–1	1–1	4–4	8–2	2–7	2–2	7–5	4–4	0–6	3–4	5–4
Elmo Adab	5–5		3–2	2–2	4–3	0–4	3–1	3–2	1–1	3–4	3–2	2–2	5–5	3–3
Eram Kish	3–2	2–4		3–0	1–2	1–3	5–4	2–4	2–4	4–3	3–3	3–3	2–5	1–1
Firooz Sofeh	6–1	2–1	3–3		0–3	1–6	4–3	3–2	3–0	6–4	1–1	2–0	2–2	5–1
Gostaresh Foolad	3–3	0–4	5–5	3–2		4–5	3–3	4–3	5–3	2–4	5–2	2–0	2–2	2–0
Foolad Mahan	10–4	4–3	2–1	3–1	3–1		6–2	5–3	2–2	8–3	3–2	4–2	4–4	7–4
Heyat Football	2–1	3–5	3–4	2–4	2–6	1–8		5–7	3–3	4–5	7–2	6–7	2–4	1–5
Melli Haffari	6–3	5–2	6–5	7–5	3–6	1–5	9–0		3–2	4–2	4–3	1–2	0–4	6–1
Petroshimi	6–2	4–4	5–0	4–2	4–3	2–1	8–4	3–4		3–3	2–4	3–1	5–3	4–6
Poushineh Baft	4–2	1–3	3–4	2–3	1–2	3–5	4–2	3–7	3–2		4–2	0–3	1–3	3–3
Rah	5–3	4–3	5–2	7–3	1–1	1–5	5–3	4–2	2–5	3–2		5–3	3–4	3–3
Sadra	1–1	2–3	4–1	5–1	5–4	2–2	4–0	6–2	2–2	3–1	3–3		3–0 (Note: Shahid Mansouri received a technical loss of 3–0 to Sadra.)	3–3
Shahid Mansouri	2–2	7–5	7–1	5–1	4–1	2–2	6–1	8–9	4–5	5–3	4–1	9–1		7–1
Shahr Aftab	3–1	3–2	3–6	3–6	7–5	2–5	4–7	4–5	3–3	4–5	6–5	2–3	1–2	

Updated to match(es) played on 25 February 2010. Source: Cups.ir
Legend: Blue = home team win; Yellow = draw; Red = away team win.

== Top goalscorers ==
34 Goals

- (Iran) Vahid Shamsaei (Foolad Mahan)

31 Goals

- (Iran) Morteza Azimaei (Rah)

25 Goals

- (Iran) Mohammad Reza Zahmatkesh (Shahid Mansouri)

23 Goals

- (Iran) Masoud Daneshvar (Sadra)
- (Iran) Alireza Ghobeishavi (Melli Haffari)

22 Goals

- (Iran) Ali Abdollahi

(Poushineh Baft)

21 Goals

- (Iran) Mahmoud Lotfi (Rah)
- (Iran) Shahram Sharifzadeh (Petroshimi)

== Awards ==
Iranian Futsal Super League
2009–10 champions
Foolad Mahan
Second title

- Winner: Foolad Mahan
- Runners-up: Shahid Mansouri
- Third-Place: Melli Haffari
- Top scorer: (Iran) Vahid Shamsaei (Foolad Mahan) (34)

== See also ==
- 2009–10 Iran Futsal's 1st Division
- 2010 Iran Futsal's 2nd Division
- 2009–10 Persian Gulf Cup
- 2009–10 Azadegan League
- 2009–10 Iran Football's 2nd Division
- 2009–10 Iran Football's 3rd Division
- 2009–10 Hazfi Cup
- Iranian Super Cup
