= 2012–13 Iran Futsal's 1st Division =

Iranian Futsal 1st Division
- Season: 2012–13
- Champions: Giti Pasand Novin; Tasisat Daryaei
- Promoted: Giti Pasand Novin; Tasisat Daryaei
- Relegated: Sadra Shiraz; Petroshimi Maron
- Matches: 116
- Goals: 652 (5.62 per match)
- Biggest home win: Tasisat Daryaei 8 - 1 Shahrdari Kashan
- Biggest away win: Sadra 1 - 6 Shahrdari Isfahan
- Highest scoring: Tasisat Daryaei 9 - 3 Homan Saz; Giti Pasand Novin 8-4 Homan Saz; Shahrdari Kashan 9 - 3 Ferdosi
- Longest winning run: 7 Games; Giti Pasand Novin
- Longest unbeaten run: 12 Games; Sh. Isfahan
- Longest winless run: 10 Games; Homan Saz
- Longest losing run: 4 Games; Ferdosi; Moghavemat Kerman; Naft Omidiyeh

The 2012–13 Iranian Futsal 1st Division will be divided into two phases.

The league will also be composed of 16 teams divided into two divisions of 8 teams each, whose teams will be divided geographically. Teams will play only other teams in their own division, once at home and once away for a total of 14 matches each.

== Teams ==
=== Play Off ===
After the Maku Javan withdrew from league, Football Association decided to hold a playoff game between the two teams that won 3rd place in their group in the 2012 2nd Division.

Team 1	Score	Team 2
Ali Sadr	3-3 (3-4) P.K	Eisatis Yazd

(P) Eisatis Yazd Promoted to the 1st Division.

30 October 2012

Ali Sadr	3–3	Eisatis Yazd
	Report
Penalties
	3–4	(penalty scored) Ayat Aeli; (penalty scored) Fazlollah Askari; (penalty scored) Mohsen Soheyli; (penalty scored) Mohammad Askari

Fajr-e Felestin Hall, Saveh
Locations of clubs in 2011–12 Futsal 1st Division

=== Group A ===
Team	City	Venue	Capacity	Head coach	Past Season
Ferdosi Mashhad	Mashhad	Shahid Beheshti	6,000	-	5th/Group A
Giti Pasand Novin	Isfahan	Pirouzi	4,300	(Iran) Mehdi Mohammadi	Promoted
Petroshimi Maron	Mahshahr	Besat	-	(Iran) Khalil Savari	6th/Group B
Naft Omidiyeh	Omidiyeh	Velayat	-	-	4th/Group B
Profile Zali	Mashhad	Fayaz Bakhsh	-	(Iran) Hossein Eslami	4th/Group A
Shahrdari Kashan	Kashan	-	-	(Iran) Saeid Mahmodi	Replaced for Afzon Plast
Shahrvand Babol	Babol	Mokhaberat	-	(Iran) Mohsen Khabiri	6th/Group A
Tasisat Daryaei	Tehran	-	-	(Iran) Hossein Shams	Replaced for Steel Azin

=== Group B ===
Team	City	Venue	Capacity	Head coach	Past Season
Bargh Shiraz	Shiraz	22nd Bahman	-	(Iran) Alireza Sharghi	Promoted
DIET Shiraz	Shiraz	-	-	(Iran) Akbar Ghanbariyan	Replaced for Bonyad Maskan Shiraz
Eisatis Yazd	Yazd	Shahediyeh	-	(Iran) Mohamad Salehi	Promoted
Heyat Football Qazvin	Qazvin	Shahid Babaei	2,500	(Iran) Mahmoud Abdullahi	3rd/Group A
Moghavemat Kerman	Kerman	-	-	-	Replaced for Kaveh Zarand
Nik Andish Shahrdari Isfahan	Isfahan	Pirouzi	4,300	(Iran) Ahmad Baghbanbashi	Replaced for Foolad Mahan Novin
Sadra	Shiraz	-	-	(Iran) Mohammad Nazem Alshariee	Replaced for Heyat Football Fars
Shahrdari Neka	Neka	Sardar Tosi	2,500	(Iran) Mehdi Nemati	Promoted

== League standings ==
=== Group A ===
Pos	Team	Pld	W	D	L	GF	GA	GD	Pts	Qualification or relegation
1	Giti Pasand Novin	14	11	1	2	57	34	+23	34	Promoted playoff
2	Tasisat Daryaei	14	9	1	4	57	36	+21	28	Promoted playoff
3	Profile Zali	14	9	1	4	52	37	+15	28	
4	Naft Omidiyeh	14	5	3	6	45	44	+1	18	
5	Sh. Kashan	14	4	3	7	50	65	−15	15	
6	Shahrvand Babol	14	4	2	8	33	45	−12	14	
7	Ferdosi	14	4	2	8	39	54	−15	14	
8	Petroshimi Maron (R)	14	2	3	9	41	59	−18	9	Relegation to 2014 2nd Division Futsal

Updated to match(es) played on 15 February 2013. Source: Giti Pasand FSC
Rules for classification: 1) points; 2) goal difference; 3) number of goals scored.
(R) Relegated

=== Group B ===
Pos	Team	Pld	W	D	L	GF	GA	GD	Pts	Qualification or relegation
1	Sh. Isfahan	14	10	3	1	45	23	+22	33	Promoted playoff
2	Heyat Football Qazvin	14	6	4	4	32	29	+3	22	Promoted playoff
3	Bargh Shiraz	14	6	3	5	34	32	+2	21	
4	DIET	14	6	2	6	34	33	+1	20	
5	Moghavemat Kerman	14	5	3	6	36	37	−1	18	
6	Eisatis Yazd	14	4	4	6	28	36	−8	16	
7	Sh. Neka	14	4	3	7	30	37	−7	15	
8	Sadra Shiraz (R)	14	1	6	7	18	30	−12	9	Relegation to 2014 2nd Division Futsal

Updated to match(es) played on 15 February 2013. Source: Bargh Shiraz FSC
Rules for classification: 1) points; 2) goal difference; 3) number of goals scored.
(R) Relegated

== Results table ==
=== Group A ===
Home \ Away	FER	SGP	MAR	NAF	ZAL	SHK	SHR	TST
Ferdosi		4–2	0–1	4–5	3–5	5–1	3–3	1–2
Giti Pasand Novin	6–4		8–4	3–1	4–1	5–3	3–0 (Note: Shahrvand Babol received a technical loss of 3-0 to Giti Pasand)	2–3
Petroshimi Maron	3–3	2–4		3–3	2–3	4–5	1–2	4–6
Naft Omidiyeh	2–3	2–4	6–4		0–1	3–2	1–2	2–2
Profile Zali	7–0 (Note: The game score was 7-6 in favor of Profile Zali until the 19:45 minute of second half.)	1–1	6–4	3–5		7–2	3–1	4–2
Sh. Kashan	9–3	4–5	4–4	3–3	5–4		5–5	3–2
Shahrvand Babol	1–4	2–5	0–2	2–7	4–5	7–3		3–1
Tasisat Daryaei	7–2	3–5	9–3	6–3	4–2 (Note: The game score was 4-2 in favor of Tasisat Daryaei until the 34:00 minute of second half.)	8–1	2–1	

Updated to match(es) played on 15 February 2013. Source:
Legend: Blue = home team win; Yellow = draw; Red = away team win.

=== Group B ===
Home \ Away	BGH	DIT	EIS	QAZ	MOK	SAD	SHI	SHN
Bargh Shiraz		2–4	5–0	4–3	4–3	0–0	4–4	7–3
DIET	0–2		4–3	0–0	5–2	3–3	1–3	3–0 (Note: The game score was 4-2 in favor of Eisatis)
Eisatis Yazd	4–0 (Note: Sh. Neka received a technical loss of 3-0 to DIET)	2–1		2–2	3–3	1–4	3–3	2–3
Heyat Football Qazvin	3–4	3–0	2–2		5–3	2–1	4–3	2–1
Moghavemat Kerman	2–0	5–2	5–1	3–2		2–1	2–3	2–2
Sadra Shiraz	2–2	1–2	0–3 (Note: Sadra Shiraz received a technical loss of 0-3 to Eisatis)	1–1	1–1		1–6	2–2
Sh. Isfahan	1–0	5–4	3–0	3–0	3–0	3–0 (Note: Sadra Shiraz received a technical loss of 3–0 to Sh. Isfahan)		3–2
Sh. Neka	3–0 (Note: Bargh Shiraz received a technical loss of 3–0 to Sh. Neka)	2–5	1–2	2–3	5–3	2–1	2–2	

Updated to match(es) played on 7 February 2013. Source:
Legend: Blue = home team win; Yellow = draw; Red = away team win.

== Clubs season-progress ==
	Win
	Draw
	Lose
W/O	Withdrew

Team ╲ Round	1	2	3	4	5	6	7	8	9	10	11	12	13	14
Bargh Shiraz	D	W	L	W	W	W	L	D	W/O	W	W	L	L	D
DIET	D	L	D	L	L	L	W	L	W	W	W	W	L	W
Eisatis Yazd	L	W	L	L	D	L	L	D	L	D	W	D	W	W
Ferdosi	L	W	W	D	W	L	L	L	D	L	L	L	L	W
Giti Pasand Novin	W	W	W	L	L	W	W	W	W	W	W	W	D	W
Heyat Football Qazvin	D	W	W	L	D	D	W	W	L	W	L	D	W	L
Petroshimi Maron	D	L	L	D	L	L	D	L	L	L	W	L	W	L
Moghavemat Kerman	W	D	W	W	L	D	L	D	W	L	L	L	L	W
Naft Omidiyeh	D	L	L	L	L	W	W	W	W	L	W	D	D	L
Profile Zali	W	W	W	L	W	L	W	W	L	W	W	W	D	L
Sadra Shiraz	D	D	D	L	L	D	W	D	L	L	W/O	D	L	W/O
Sh. Isfahan	W	L	W	W	W	W	W	D	W	D	W	W	W	D
Sh. Kashan	L	W	L	W	L	L	D	L	L	W	L	D	D	W
Sh. Neka	L	L	L	W	W	D	L	D	W	L	L	D	W	W/O
Shahrvand Babol	L	L	L	W	W	W	L	W	D	L	L	D	L	W/O
Tasisat Daryaei	W	L	W	W	W	W	L	L	W	W	L	D	W	W

== Play Off ==
Team 1	Agg.	Team 2	1st leg	2nd leg
Giti Pasand Novin Isfahan	7 - 3	Heyat Football Qazvin	3 - 0	4 - 3

Winner Promoted to the Super League.

=== First leg ===
22 February 2013
19:00 UTC+03:30

Heyat Football Qazvin	0–3	Giti Pasand Novin Isfahan
	Report	Farshad Shareghi; Hamed Abdollahi; Iman Edris

Sahid Babaei Arena, Qazvin
Attendance: 400
Referee: Vahid Arzpeyma

=== Return leg ===
28 February 2013
17:00 UTC+03:30

Giti Pasand Novin Isfahan	4–3	Heyat Football Qazvin
Mohammad Dehkhoda 2 Hossein Kashani 2	Report

Pirouzi Arena, Isfahan

Team 1	Agg.	Team 2	1st leg	2nd leg
Tasisat Daryaei	6 - 5	Nik Andish Shahrdari Isfahan	2 - 2	4 - 3

Winner Promoted to the Super League.

=== First leg ===
22 February 2013
17:00 UTC+03:30

Tasisat Daryaei	2–2	Nik Andish Shahrdari Isfahan
	Report	Hamzeh Papi; Saeed Afshari

Khane Handball Hall, Tehran

=== Return leg ===
1 March 2013
17:00 UTC+03:30

Nik Andish Shahrdari Isfahan	3–4	Tasisat Daryaei

Pirouzi Arena, Isfahan

== See also ==
- 2012–13 Futsal Super League
- 2013 Iran Futsal's 2nd Division
- 2012–13 Persian Gulf Cup
- 2012–13 Azadegan League
- 2012–13 Iran Football's 2nd Division
- 2012–13 Iran Football's 3rd Division
- 2012–13 Hazfi Cup
- Iranian Super Cup
