= Bargh =

Bargh may refer to:

== People ==
- Ian Bargh (1935–2012), British jazz pianist
- John Bargh (born 1955), American social psychologist
- Maria Bargh, New Zealand academic
- Renee Bargh (born 1986), Australian entertainment reporter
- Robyn Bargh, New Zealand book publishing executive

== Sports ==
- Bargh Shiraz F.C., an Iranian football club based in Shiraz, Iran
- Bargh Tehran F.C., an Iranian football club based in Tehran, Iran, dissolved in 2007
- Bargh Shiraz FSC, an Iranian futsal club based in Shiraz

== Other uses ==
- Bargh., author abbreviation for American paleobotanist Elso Sterrenberg Barghoorn
- Bargh Glacier, in Antarctica
