= Hilal Ahmar Tabriz FSC =

Iranian futsal club

Hilal Ahmar هلال احمر
- Full name: Hilal Ahmar Tabriz Futsal Club
- Short name: Hilal Ahmar
- Dissolved: August 09, 2014
- Ground: Hilal Ahmar Arena, Tabriz
- Owner: Hilal Ahmar

Hilal Ahmar Tabriz Futsal Club (Persian: باشگاه فوتسال هلال احمر تبریز) was an Iranian futsal club based in Tabriz. Hilal Ahmar took over the licence of Gostaresh Foolad Tabriz in 2012-13 Super League.

== Season-by-season ==
The table below chronicles the achievements of the Club in various competitions.

Season	League	Position	Hazfi	Notes
2006–07	1st Division	?		Promoted Play Off
2007–08	1st Division	?		Promoted Play Off
2008 ~ 2012	?	?
2012–13	Super League	11th		bought Gostaresh Foolad Tabriz
2013–14	Super League	9th	Withdrew

== players ==
=== Current squad ===
Note: Flags indicate national team as defined under FIFA eligibility rules; some limited exceptions apply. Players may hold more than one non-FIFA nationality.

No.	Pos.	Nation	Player
1		IRN	Naser Esmaeili
3		IRN	Babak Alahverdikhani
6		IRN	Majid Iraji
7		IRN	Hadi Bafandeh
8		IRN	Asghar Khani
9		IRN	Sajad Torbat
10		IRN	Ahmad Safari
11		IRN	Mojtaba Vafadar

No.	Pos.	Nation	Player
12		IRN	Hasan Mohammadi
13		IRN	Amir Mir Mosaviyan
15		IRN	Mostafa Ekhlasiyan
19		IRN	Shahram Sharifzadeh
20		IRN	Hamid Vahedi
23		IRN	Ramin Jafari
32		IRN	Javad Montazar

=== Notable players ===
- (Iran) Shahram Sharifzadeh
