= 2008–09 Iranian Futsal Super League =

Futsal Super League
- Season: 2008–09
- Champions: Foolad Mahan
- Matches played: 182
- Goals scored: 1,175 (6.46 per match)
- Top goalscorer: 32 Goals; Morteza Azimaei; Vahid Shamsaei
- Biggest home win: Melli Haffari 9-0 Zoghalsang
- Biggest away win: Zoghalsang 1-8 Foolad Mahan
- Highest scoring: Labaniyat Arjan 5-10 Shahid Mansouri; Foolad Mahan 12-3 Eram Kish

The following is the standings of the Futsal Super League's 2008/09 season.

== League standings ==
Pos	Team	Pld	W	D	L	GF	GA	GD	Pts	Qualification or relegation
1	Foolad Mahan (C)	22	16	3	3	97	50	+47	51	League Champions
2	Eram Kish	22	13	4	5	88	60	+28	43	
3	Tam Iran Khodro	22	12	5	5	88	59	+29	41	
4	Shahid Mansouri	22	11	6	5	83	67	+16	39	
5	Rah	22	10	3	9	63	60	+3	33	
6	Gostaresh Foolad	22	10	2	10	70	65	+5	32	
7	Poushineh Baft	22	8	6	8	73	75	−2	30	
8	Labaniyat Arjan	22	7	6	9	67	83	−16	27	
9	Elmo Adab	22	5	8	9	50	67	−17	23	
10	Melli Haffari	22	5	5	12	81	102	−21	20	
11	Sadra	22	3	7	12	52	65	−13	16	
12	Zoghalsang	22	4	1	17	44	103	−59	13	
13	Azad University (R)	0	0	0	0	0	0	0	0 (Note: Azad University withdrew from the league before the beginning.)	Relegation to the 1st Division
14	Esteghlal (R)	0	0	0	0	0	0	0	0 (Note: Esteghlal disqualification from the league before the beginning.)	Relegation to the 1st Division

Updated to match(es) played on 17 January 2009. Source: http://cups.ir
Rules for classification: 1) points; 2) goal difference; 3) number of goals scored.
(C) Champions; (R) Relegated

== Results table ==
Home \ Away	ARJ	ELM	ERM	GFT	MAH	HFR	BAF	RAS	SAD	MAN	TAM	ZOG
Labaniyat Arjan		1–1	3–3	5–2	4–0	6–6	2–2	3–2	5–3	5–10	2–5	5–2
Elmo Adab	1–1		1–7	5–1	3–5	3–3	2–2	2–0	4–3	2–4	6–3	2–1
Eram Kish	7–3	1–1		2–1	0–5	5–2	3–0	3–1	6–1	8–3	4–5	7–1
Gostaresh Foolad	1–3	4–1	2–4		3–1	4–3	5–4	6–1	2–1	2–3	0–3	5–3
Foolad Mahan	8–4	3–3	12–3	1–3		8–3	6–3	5–1	3–2	5–2	2–2	6–2
Melli Haffari	5–1	4–4	2–5	5–4	2–6		5–4	2–2	3–2	1–2	3–8	10–2
Poushineh Baft	4–3	5–2	4–4	3–3	1–5	7–5		1–3	4–4	3–2	2–6	6–2
Rah	6–1	7–3	2–1	4–3	2–3	8–4	1–3		3–1	2–2	5–3	6–2
Sadra	2–3	2–2	1–3	2–4	1–3	6–6	4–1	3–1		3–3	1–1	1–1
Shahid Mansouri	7–3	2–1	5–4	3–3	1–1	7–4	2–5	3–3	3–3		3–0	5–2
Tam Iran Khodro	2–2	5–0	3–3	6–5	3–4	4–2	6–2	6–0	3–2	5–3		8–2
Zoghalsang	4–2	3–1	2–5	2–7	2–5	4–1	1–4	0–3	1–4	2–8	3–2	

Source: http://cups.ir
Legend: Blue = home team win; Yellow = draw; Red = away team win.

== Top goalscorers ==
32 Goals

- (Iran) Morteza Azimaei (Rah)
- (Iran) Vahid Shamsaei (Foolad Mahan)

== Awards ==
Iranian Futsal Super League
2008–09 champions
Foolad Mahan
First title

- Winner: Foolad Mahan
- Runners-up: Eram Kish
- Third-Place: Tam Iran Khodro
- Top scorer: (Iran) Morteza Azimaei (Rah) / (Iran) Vahid Shamsaei (Foolad Mahan) (32)

== See also ==
- 2008–09 Persian Gulf Cup
- 2008–09 Azadegan League
- 2008–09 Iran Football's 2nd Division
- 3rd Division
- 2008–09 Hazfi Cup
