= Petroshimi Tabriz FSC =

Iranian futsal club

Petroshimi
- Full name: Petroshimi Tabriz Futsal Club
- Nickname(s): Sky Blues (Persian: آسمانی پوشان); Azarbaijan's Petro
- Dissolved: 2010
- Ground: Petroshimi Arena, Tabriz
Home colours	Away colours

Petroshimi Tabriz Futsal Club (Persian: باشگاه فوتسال پتروشیمی تبریز) was an Iranian futsal club based in Tabriz. In 2010 Petroshimi Tabriz was terminate their Futsal activities. Dabiri Tabriz took over their license.

== Season-by-season ==
The table below chronicles the achievements of the Club in various competitions.

Season	League	Position	Notes
2007	2nd Division	??	Promoted Play Off
2008	2nd Division	??	Promoted Play Off
2008–09	1st Division	1st	Promoted Play Off
2009–10	Futsal Super League	4th

== Managers ==
(Iran) Shahabeddin Sofalmanesh
(Iran) Ali Khosravi

== See also ==
- Petrochimi Tabriz F.C.
- Petrochimi Tabriz Cycling Team
