= Shahrdari Tabriz FSC =

Iranian sports club

Shahrdari Tabriz FSC شهرداري تبريز
- Full name: Shahrdari Tabriz Futsal Club
- Dissolved: August, 2014
- Ground: Shahid Pour Sharifi Arena; Tabriz
- Capacity: 6,000
- Chairman: (Iran) Mir Masoum Sohrabi
- Head Coach: (Iran) Esmail Taghipour
- League: Super League
- 2013-14: 8th
- Website: http://sport.tabriz.ir/

Shahrdari Tabriz Cultural and Athletic Club (Persian: باشگاه فرهنگی ورزشی شهرداري تبريز) is an Iranian sports club most widely known for its professional futsal team based in Tabriz, Iran.They currently compete in the Iranian Futsal Super League, the 1st tier of Iranian futsal.

== Season-by-season ==
The table below chronicles the achievements of the Club in various competitions.

Season	League	Position	Hazfi	Notes
2009	2 Div	??		Promoted Play Off
2009–10	1 Div	6th/Group A		bought Romatism Tehran
2010–11	1 Div	4th/Group A
2011-12	1 Div	1st/Group A		Promoted
2012-13	Super League	7th
2013-14	Super League	8th	Semi-Final

== Honours ==
- Iran Futsal's 1st Division
  - Champions (1): 2011-12

== First-team squad 2012-13 ==
Note: Flags indicate national team as defined under FIFA eligibility rules; some limited exceptions apply. Players may hold more than one non-FIFA nationality.

No.	Pos.	Nation	Player
1		IRN	Yaghob Filgosh
2		IRN	Babak Akbari
3		IRN	Ramin Rostamiyan
5		IRN	Babak Nasiri
6		IRN	Moslm Rostamiha
7		IRN	Majid Tikdarinejad
8		IRN	Hashem Amnizadeh
10		IRN	Majid Rezaei
11		IRN	Hamed Hossienzadeh
12		IRN	Amin Mehmandoost

No.	Pos.	Nation	Player
13		IRN	Iraj Jahanbakhsh
16		IRN	Morteza Ezati
17		IRN	Davood Tajbakhsh
18	DF	IRN	Vahid Shafiei
19		IRN	Hamid Charkhiyan
21		IRN	Saeed Moemeni
22		IRN	Hatef Ghanbari
—		IRN	Afshin Sepah
—		IRN	Ali Mikaeili

== See also ==
- Shahrdari Tabriz Football Club
