= Bargh Shiraz FSC =

Iranian futsal club

- Full name: Bargh Shiraz Futsal Club
- Nickname(s): Bargh Shiraz
- Founded: 2008
- Dissolved: February, 2015
- Ground: 22nd Bahman Arena, Shiraz
- Owner: (Iran) Hossein Farsi
- Chairman: (Iran) Heydar Ali Kaamyab
- Head Coach: -
- League: Iran Futsal's 1st Division
- 2013-14: 9th / Group A
- Website: http://barghshirazfutsal.blogfa.com/

Bargh Shiraz Futsal Club (Persian: باشگاه فوتسال برق شیراز) is an Iranian futsal club based in Shiraz.

== Season-by-season ==
The table below chronicles the achievements of the club in various competitions.

Season	League	Position	Hazfi	Notes
2008-09	Shiraz Province League	4th
2009-10	Shiraz Province League	1st		Promoted
2011	2nd Division	5th/Group B
2012	2nd Division	1st/Group B		Promoted
2012-13	1st Division	3rd / Group B
2013-14	1st Division	9th / Group A	Withdrew	Relegation

== Honors ==
National:

- Iran Futsal's 2nd Division
  - Champions (1): 2012
- Shiraz Province League
  - Champions (1): 2009-10

== Current squad 2012 ==
Note: Flags indicate national team as defined under FIFA eligibility rules; some limited exceptions apply. Players may hold more than one non-FIFA nationality.

No.	Pos.	Nation	Player
9		(Iran) IRN	Mohammad Amin Sharghi (Captain)
—		(Iran) IRN	Mohammad Montazar Al Mahdi
—		(Iran) IRN	Mohammad Hasan Abbasi (Vice-Captain)
—		(Iran) IRN	Saeed Khosh Kholg
—		(Iran) IRN	Meysam Barmashori
—		(Iran) IRN	Farshid Shabani
—		(Iran) IRN	Farshid Sharifi
—		(Iran) IRN	Amir Aseman Bakhsh
—		(Iran) IRN	Milad Khabazzadeh
—		(Iran) IRN	MOhammadreza Moradiyan
—		(Iran) IRN	Saeed Hosseini

No.	Pos.	Nation	Player
—	GK	(Iran) IRN	Arash Dariushi
—		(Iran) IRN	Hamidreza Moghtadaei
—		(Iran) IRN	Ehsan Jamebozorgi
—		(Iran) IRN	Ali Hassan Shahi
—		(Iran) IRN	Ehsan Panahpour Salehi
—		(Iran) IRN	Mohammad Forotan
—		(Iran) IRN	Mehrzad Zarei
—		(Iran) IRN	Edris Sabaghi
—		(Iran) IRN	Arash Bagherzadeh
—		(Iran) IRN	Omid Norozi

== See also ==
- Bargh Shiraz Football Club
