= 2014–15 Iran Futsal's 1st Division =

Iranian Futsal 1st Division
- Season: 2014–15
- Champions: Kashi Nilou
- Promoted: Azarakhsh; Kashi Nilou
- Relegated: Shahrdari Neka; Yaran Javan
- Matches: 120
- Goals: 584 (4.87 per match)
- Biggest home win: Zagros 10 - 2 Yaran Javan
- Biggest away win: Zagros 2 - 6 Bazargani
- Highest scoring: Zagros 10 - 2 Yaran Javan
- Longest winning run: 4 Games Kashi Nilou (1st week~4th week)
- Longest unbeaten run: 9 Games Kashi Nilou (10th week~4th week play-off)
- Longest winless run: 9 Games Shahed (6th week~14th week)
- Longest losing run: 4 Games Yaran Javan (1st week~4th week); Iran Jahan (2nd week~5th week)

The 2014–15 Iranian Futsal 1st Division will be divided into two phases.

The league will also be composed of 16 teams divided into two divisions of 8 teams each, whose teams will be divided geographically. Teams will play only other teams in their own division, once at home and once away for a total of 14 matches each.

== Teams ==
Locations of clubs in 2014–15 Futsal 1st Division

=== Group Khazar Sea ===
| Team | City | Venue | Capacity | Head coach | Past Season |
|---|---|---|---|---|---|
| Azad University | Tehran | - | - | (Iran) Mahmoud Ghazi | Replaced for Persepolis Behzisti |
| Heyat Football Isfahan | Isfahan | Pirouzi | 4,300 | (Iran) Reza Sadeghi | Replaced for Nik Andish Shahrdari Isfahan |
| Iran Jahan | Mashhad | Fayaz Bakhsh | - | - | Replaced for Ali Sadr |
| Kashi Nilou | Isfahan | Pirouzi | 4,300 | (Iran) Alireza Afzal | 4th/Group A |
| Keshavarz Qazvin | Qazvin | Shahid Babaei | 2,500 | (Iran) Mahmoud Abdolahi | 3rd/Group A |
| Pas Qavamin | Tehran | Dastgerdi | - | (Iran) Gholamreza Moradi | Promoted |
| Pent House Mashhad | Mashhad | Kosar | - | (Iran) Ali Amini | 5th/Group B |
| Shahrdari Neka | Neka | Sardar Tosi | 2,500 | (Iran) Ahad Jafari | 6th/Group B |

=== Group Persian Gulf ===
| Team | City | Venue | Capacity | Head coach | Past Season |
|---|---|---|---|---|---|
| Arjan Shiraz | Shiraz | Shahid Nasiri | - | (Iran) Hamid Reza Kamali | 3rd/Group B |
| Azarakhsh | Bandar Abbas | Fajr Bandar Abbas | - | (Iran) Abbas Rozpeykar | Promoted |
| Bank Resalat Kerman^{1} | Kerman | Ostandari | - | (Iran) Mohsen Hakak | 5th/Group A |
| Bazargani Ideal | Yazd | Edalat | - | (Iran) Mohammad Baghban Salehi | Replaced for Eisatis Yazd |
| Esteghlal Novin^{2} | Mahshahr | Besat | - | (Iran) Babak Davani | Relegated |
| Shahed Shiraz | Shiraz | Shahid Abolfathi Arena | - | (Iran) Amir Hosein Barzegar | Replaced for DIET Shiraz |
| Yaran Javan | Bandar Abbas | Fajr Bandar Abbas | - | (Iran) Masoud Kiyanfar | Replaced for Zam Zam |
| Zagros Khozestan | Ahvaz | Jahad Keshavarzi | - | (Iran) Heydar Farhadi | 7th/Group B |

- ^{1} Moghavemat Kerman Renamed to Bank Resalat Kerman
- ^{2} Amaliyat Qeyr Sanati Renamed to Esteghlal Novin

== League standings ==
=== Group A ===
| Pos | Team | Pld | W | D | L | GF | GA | GD | Pts | Qualification or relegation |
|---|---|---|---|---|---|---|---|---|---|---|
| 1 | Kashi Nilou | 14 | 10 | 1 | 3 | 44 | 24 | +20 | 31 | Promoted playoff |
| 2 | Ayandeh Gostar | 14 | 8 | 1 | 5 | 38 | 32 | +6 | 25 | Promoted playoff |
| 3 | Pas Qavamin | 14 | 6 | 3 | 5 | 30 | 38 | −8 | 21 | |
| 4 | Azad University | 14 | 6 | 1 | 7 | 31 | 31 | 0 | 19 | |
| 5 | Pent House | 14 | 5 | 2 | 7 | 23 | 28 | −5 | 17 | |
| 6 | Iran Jahan | 14 | 4 | 3 | 7 | 32 | 38 | −6 | 15 | |
| 7 | Keshavarz Qazvin | 14 | 4 | 3 | 7 | 31 | 37 | −6 | 15 | |
| 8 | Sh. Neka | 14 | 3 | 4 | 7 | 26 | 27 | −1 | 13 | Relegation to 2016 Iran Futsal's 2nd Division |

Updated to match(es) played on 6 February 2015. Source:
Rules for classification: 1) points; 2) goal difference; 3) number of goals scored.

=== Group B ===
| Pos | Team | Pld | W | D | L | GF | GA | GD | Pts | Qualification or relegation |
|---|---|---|---|---|---|---|---|---|---|---|
| 1 | Bank Resalat | 14 | 9 | 3 | 2 | 41 | 31 | +10 | 30 | Promoted playoff |
| 2 | Azarakhsh | 14 | 8 | 1 | 5 | 35 | 30 | +5 | 25 | Promoted playoff |
| 3 | Zagros | 14 | 7 | 3 | 4 | 54 | 44 | +10 | 24 | |
| 4 | Bazargani Ideal | 14 | 7 | 3 | 4 | 36 | 27 | +9 | 24 | |
| 5 | Arjan | 14 | 6 | 3 | 5 | 34 | 33 | +1 | 21 | |
| 6 | Est. Novin Mahshahr | 14 | 3 | 3 | 8 | 31 | 40 | −9 | 12 | |
| 7 | Shahed Shiraz | 14 | 3 | 3 | 8 | 26 | 36 | −10 | 12 | |
| 8 | Yaran Javan | 14 | 2 | 3 | 9 | 32 | 48 | −16 | 9 | Relegation to 2016 Iran Futsal's 2nd Division |

Updated to match(es) played on 6 February 2015. Source:
Rules for classification: 1) points; 2) goal difference; 3) number of goals scored.

== Results table ==
=== Group A ===
| Home \ Away | AGI | UNI | JAH | NIL | KSH | QAV | PEN | SHN |
|---|---|---|---|---|---|---|---|---|
| Ayandeh Gostar | | 3–1 | 1–3 | 1–3 | 5–3 | 2–2 | 5–1 | 2–1 |
| Azad University | 1–4 | | 5–2 | 1–2 | 4–2 | 6–0 | 1–4 | 2–1 |
| Iran Jahan | 2–3 | 2–3 | | 2–2 | 1–4 | 5–1 | 3–3 | 1–4 |
| Kashi Nilou | 6–1 | 3–1 | 5–3 | | 4–2 | 4–2 | 2–1 | 2–0 |
| Keshavarz Qazvin | 2–4 | 3–2 | 0–1 | 4–3 | | 3–3 | 2–0 | 2–2 |
| Pas Qavamin | 3–2 | 1–1 | 4–2 | 3–2 | 2–0 | | 1–0 | 3–2 |
| Pent House | 2–1 | 1–3 | 1–3 | 2–3 | 4–2 | 3–2 | | 1–0 |
| Sh. Neka | 2–4 | 3–0 (Note: Azad University received a technical loss of 3-0 to Sh. Neka) | 2–2 | 1–3 | 2–2 | 6–3 | 0–0 | |

Updated to match(es) played on 6 February 2015. Source:
Legend: Blue = home team win; Yellow = draw; Red = away team win.

=== Group B ===
| Home \ Away | ARJ | AZA | BRK | BAZ | ESM | SHA | YAR | ZAG |
|---|---|---|---|---|---|---|---|---|
| Arjan | | 5–2 | 3–3 | 0–3 | 2–1 | 3–2 | 4–2 | 3–3 |
| Azarakhsh | 2–0 | | 4–1 | 1–0 | 3–2 | 3–2 | 5–4 | 4–0 |
| Bank Resalat | 3–1 | 4–2 | | 6–4 | 3–2 | 3–1 | 3–1 | 5–4 |
| Bazargani Ideal | 2–1 | 2–1 | 2–2 | | 3–3 | 1–0 | 4–1 | 2–1 |
| Est. Novin Mahshahr | 3–3 | 2–1 | 0–2 | 3–2 | | 4–2 | 0–0 | 4–5 |
| Shahed Shiraz | 1–3 | 2–2 | 2–2 | 3–2 | 3–3 | | 3–1 | 2–2 |
| Yaran Javan | 2–3 | 3–4 | 1–3 | 3–3 | 5–1 | 3–1 | | 5–5 |
| Zagros | 4–3 | 4–2 | 4–1 | 2–6 | 6–3 | 4–2 | 10–2 | |

Updated to match(es) played on 6 February 2015. Source:
Legend: Blue = home team win; Yellow = draw; Red = away team win.

== Clubs season-progress ==
| | Win |
| | Draw |
| | Lose |
| W/O | Withdrew |

| Team ╲ Round | 1 | 2 | 3 | 4 | 5 | 6 | 7 | 8 | 9 | 10 | 11 | 12 | 13 | 14 |
|---|---|---|---|---|---|---|---|---|---|---|---|---|---|---|
| Arjan | W | W | W | L | D | L | W | W | W | D | L | L | D | L |
| Ayandeh Gostar | L | W | W | D | W | W | W | L | W | L | L | W | W | L |
| Azad University | D | W | L | W/O | L | L | W | W | W | L | W | W | L | L |
| Azarakhsh | L | W | L | W | L | W | L | W | D | W | W | W | L | W |
| Bank Resalat | W | W | W | L | W | W | D | W | W | D | W | L | D | W |
| Bazargani Ideal | W | W | L | W | L | W | L | L | W | D | W | W | D | D |
| Est. Novin Mahshahr | L | L | L | W | L | L | W | L | L | D | D | D | W | D |
| Iran Jahan | W | L | L | L | L | W | L | L | L | W | D | D | D | W |
| Kashi Nilou | W | W | W | W | L | W | W | W | L | W | D | W | W | W |
| Keshavarz Qazvin | L | L | D | L | L | D | L | W | W | D | W | L | L | W |
| Pas Qavamin | D | L | W | D | W | D | W | L | W | L | W | L | W | L |
| Pent House | W | W | L | W | W | L | L | D | L | W | L | L | D | L |
| Sh. Neka | L | L | D | W | W | L | L | D | L | D | L | D | L | W |
| Shahed Shiraz | L | L | W | L | W | L | D | L | D | L | D | L | D | L |
| Yaran Javan | L | L | L | L | W | L | D | L | L | W | L | D | D | L |
| Zagros | W | L | W | W | D | W | D | W | L | L | L | W | D | W |

== Play-off ==
| Pos | Team | Pld | W | D | L | GF | GA | GD | Pts | Qualification | NIL | AZA | BRK | AGI |
|---|---|---|---|---|---|---|---|---|---|---|---|---|---|---|
| 1 | Kashi Nilou | 6 | 4 | 1 | 1 | 19 | 9 | +10 | 13 | Iranian Futsal Super League | | 2–0 | 3–0 (Note: Ayandeh Gostar and Bank Resalat received a technical loss of 3-0 to Azarakhsh and Kashi Nilou.) | 6–1 |
| 2 | Azarakhsh | 6 | 4 | 1 | 1 | 16 | 10 | +6 | 13 | Iranian Futsal Super League | 5–3 | | 3–1 | 2–2 |
| 3 | Bank Resalat | 6 | 1 | 2 | 3 | 12 | 14 | −2 | 5 | | 2–2 | 2–3 | | 6–2 |
| 4 | Ayandeh Gostar | 6 | 0 | 2 | 4 | 7 | 21 | −14 | 2 | | 1–3 | 0–3 | 1–1 | |

Updated to match(es) played on 12 March 2015. Source:
Rules for classification: 1) points; 2) goal difference; 3) number of goals scored.

=== Clubs season-progress ===
| | Win |
| | Draw |
| | Lose |
| W/O | Withdrew |

| Team ╲ Round | 1 | 2 | 3 | 4 | 5 | 6 |
|---|---|---|---|---|---|---|
| Ayandeh Gostar | L | D | D | L | L | W/O |
| Azarakhsh | W | L | D | W | W | W |
| Bank Resalat | L | D | D | L | W | W/O |
| Kashi Nilou | W | W | D | W | L | W |

== See also ==
- 2014–15 Futsal Super League
- 2015 Futsal's 2nd Division
- 2014–15 Iran Pro League
- 2014–15 Azadegan League
- 2014–15 Iran Football's 2nd Division
- 2014–15 Iran Football's 3rd Division
- 2014–15 Hazfi Cup
- Iranian Super Cup
