= Sadra Shiraz FSC =

Iranian futsal club

Sadra
- Full name: Sadra Shiraz Futsal Club
- Founded: 1995; 30 years ago
- Ground: Omid Indoor Stadium, Shiraz
- League: Iran Futsal's 2nd Division
- 2018-19: 9th (Group A) (relegated)
- Website: http://www.sadrasport.ir/

Sadra Shiraz Futsal Club (Persian: باشگاه فوتسال صدرا شیراز) was an Iranian futsal club based in Shahrak-e-Sadra, Shiraz.

== Season-by-season ==
The table below chronicles the achievements of the Club in various competitions.

Season	League	Position	Notes
1996-97	Shiraz Province League	2nd	
1997~2002	??	??	
2002-03	Premiere League	?	
2003-04	Super League	6th	
2004-05	Super League	11th	
2005-06	Super League	7th	
2007-08	Super League	12th	
2008-09	Super League	11th	
2009-10	Super League	5th	
2009-10	Super League	5th	
2010-11	1st Division	4th (Group B)	
2011-12	Dissolved		
2012-13	1st Division	8th (Group B)	Relegation
2013~2016	Dissolved		
2016	2nd Division	7th (Group 4)	Relegation
2017	2nd Division	4th (Group 3)	
2018	2nd Division	5th (Group 3)	
2018-19	1st Division	9th (Group A)	Relegation

== Honors ==
- Shiraz Province League
  - Runners-up (1): 1997

== Notable players ==
- (Iran) Mohammad Nazemasharieh
- (Iran) Masoud Daneshvar
- (Iran) Mohammad Hashemzadeh
- (Iran) Hamid Reza Abrarinia
- (Iran) Mehran Alighadr
- (Iran) Alireza Samimi

== Managers ==
- (Iran) Mohammad Abbasi
- (Iran) Asadollah Azizi
- (Iran) Abdolreza Barzegar
- (Iran) Ali Doran
- (Iran) Gholam Ali Honarpisheh
- (Iran) Mohammad Nazemasharieh
- (Iran) Mehdi Rastgou
