= Gaz Khozestan FSC =

Iranian futsal club

Gaz Khuzestan FSC
- Full name: Gaz Khuzestan Futsal Club
- Ground: Shohada Gaz, Ahvaz
- Head Coach: (Iran) Mohammad Reza Davoudinejad
- 2012-13: 12th
- Website: http://www.nigc-khgc.ir

Gaz Khuzestan Futsal Club (Persian: باشگاه فوتسال گاز خوزستان) is an Iranian futsal club based in Ahvaz.

== Season-by-season ==
The table below chronicles the achievements of the Club in various competitions.

Season	League	Position	Notes
2005	Khuzestan League	1st	Promoted
2005~08	???
2008-09	Local League	2nd	Promoted
2009	2nd Division	1st	Promoted Play Off
2009-10	1st Division	1st/Group B
2010-11	1st Division	6th/Group B
2011-12	1st Division	1st/Group B	Promoted Play Off
2012-13	Futsal Super League	12th

Champions	Runners-up	Third Place	Fourth Place	Relegation	Promoted	Did not qualify	not held

== Players ==
=== Current squad ===
Note: Flags indicate national team as defined under FIFA eligibility rules; some limited exceptions apply. Players may hold more than one non-FIFA nationality.

No.	Pos.	Nation	Player
1		(Iran) IRN	Mohammad Amin Ghasemi
4		(Iran) IRN	Abbolfazl Barani
5		(Iran) IRN	Humayoun Zanganeh
6		(Iran) IRN	Amir Shirali
8		(Iran) IRN	Yasin Sajjadi Mehr
9		(Iran) IRN	Jalaleddin Eizadpanah
10		(Iran) IRN	Alireza Ghobeishavi
13		(Iran) IRN	Hassan Sajedi
15		(Iran) IRN	Hahid Nabhani

No.	Pos.	Nation	Player
16		(Iran) IRN	Pedram Valipour
17		(Iran) IRN	Reza Rashto
22		(Iran) IRN	Ghader Dezfolizadeh
—		(Iran) IRN	Sadegh Loveini
—		(Iran) IRN	Shayan Bakhtiarizadeh
—		(Iran) IRN	Ezat Mohammadzadeh
—		(Iran) IRN	Amin Barati
—		(Iran) IRN	Poriya Hadizadeh

== Honours ==
- Iran Futsal's 1st Division
  - Champions (1): 2011-12
- Iran Futsal's 2nd Division
  - Champions (1): 2009
- Local League
  - Runners-up (1): 2008-09
- Khuzestan League
  - Champions (1): 2005
