= Ferdosi Mashhad FSC =

Iranian futsal club

Ferdosi Mashhad FSC فردوسی مشهد
- Full name: Eghtedar Novin Ferdosi Mashhad Futsal Club
- Short name: Ferdosi Mashhad
- Founded: October 2011; 5 years ago
- Ground: Kargaran Bagherabad Mashhad Arena; Mashhad
- Capacity: 1,000
- Owner(s): Ferdosi Finance & Credit Institution
- Chairman: (Iran) Mostafa Nemati
- Head Coach: (Iran) Mostafa Nemati
- League: Iran Futsal's 1st Division
- 2016-17: 4th / Group A
- Website: http://enfclub.com/

Eghtedar Novin Ferdosi Mashhad Futsal Club (Persian: باشگاه فوتسال اقتدار نوین فردوسی مشهد) is an Iranian futsal club based in Mashhad, Iran. They currently compete in the Iranian Futsal Super League, the 1st tier of Iranian futsal.

== Season-by-season ==
The table below chronicles the achievements of the Club in various competitions.

Season	League	Position	Hazfi	Notes
2011-12	1 Div	5th / Group A		bought Dabiri Novin
2012-13	1 Div	7th / Group A
2013-14	1 Div	2nd / Group B	Fourth Round	Promoted
2014-15	Super League	10th
2015-16	Super League	13th		Relegation
2016-17	1 Div	4th / Group A

== First-team squad ==
Note: Flags indicate national team as defined under FIFA eligibility rules; some limited exceptions apply. Players may hold more than one non-FIFA nationality.

No.	Pos.	Nation	Player
—		IRN	Ali Fakher
—		IRN	Mohsen Rajaei
—		IRN	Dariush Keshtokar
—		IRN	Mohsen Nezamdoust
—		IRN	Davoud Abbasi
—		IRN	Hashem Mohammadi
—		IRN	Morteza Mohammadi

No.	Pos.	Nation	Player
—		IRN	Arash Ghadimi
—		IRN	Mohammad Shamaei
—		IRN	Salar Vazifeshenas
—		IRN	Sajjad Bandi Saadi
—		IRN	Ebrahim Hajati
—		IRN	Emadeddin Mohammadi Reshvaei
—		IRN	Naser Ajam
