= Bank Resalat Kerman FSC =

Iranian futsal club

Bank Resalat
- Full name: Bank Resalat Kerman Futsal Club
- Founded: 2006 as Zoghalsang

Bank Resalat Kerman Futsal Club (Persian: باشگاه فوتسال بانک رسالت کرمان) is an Iranian futsal club based in Kerman.

== History ==
Zoghalsang Kerman Company bought Estandard Karaj FSC sports activities due to financial problems and took over their license in 2006–07 Iran Futsal's 1st Division.The club was originally known as Zoghalsang Kerman. In the half season of 2008–09 Iranian Futsal Super League it was renamed Ashkan Kerman due to change of sponsorship. in the 2009–10 Iranian Futsal Super League they were renamed again to Heyat Football Kerman. in the 2010–11 Iran Futsal's 1st Division they were renamed to Siman Kerman. in the 2011–12 Iran Futsal's 1st Division they were renamed to Kaveh Zarand Kerman due to change of sponsorship. in the 2012–13 Iran Futsal's 1st Division it was bought Moghavemat Tehran license and renamed to Moghavemat Kerman. in the 2014–15 Iran Futsal's 1st Division they were renamed to Bank Resalat Kerman due to change of sponsorship.

== Season-by-season ==
The table below chronicles the achievements of the Club in various competitions.

Season	League	Position	Hazfi	Notes
2006–07	1st Division	?		Promoted
2007–08	Super League	10th
2008–09	Super League	12th
2009–10	Super League	14th		Relegation
2010–11	1st Division	7th / Group B
2011–12	1st Division	7th / Group B
2012–13	1st Division	5th / Group B
2013–14	1st Division	5th / Group A	Withdrew
2014–15	1st Division	3rd / Play Off
2015–16	1st Division	6th/Group B

== Honours ==
- Iran Futsal's 1st Division
  - Champions (1): 2006–07

== Notable players ==
- (Iran) Javad Asghari Moghaddam
- (Iran) Majid Tikdarinejad
- (Iran) Hossein Sabouri
