= 2015–16 Iran Futsal's 1st Division =

Iranian Futsal 1st Division
- Season: 2015–16
- Champions: Labaniyat Arjan Shiraz
- Promoted: Labaniyat Arjan Shiraz; Shahrdari Saveh
- Relegated: Keshavarz Qazvin; Shahrvand Kashan
- Matches: 124
- Goals: 708 (5.71 per match)
- Biggest home win: Azad University 8 - 0 Sunich
- Biggest away win: Shahrvand Kashan 1 - 10 Sunich
- Highest scoring: Arjan 12 - 6 Moble Karimi; Pas 12 - 6 Shahrvand Kashan
- Longest winning run: 4 Games Zagros (2nd week~5th week); Arjan (5th week~8th week) (13th week~2nd week play-off); Azad University (11th week~14th week); Paj (10th week~13th week)
- Longest unbeaten run: 17 Games Arjan (1st week~3rd week play-off)
- Longest winless run: 9 Games Shahrvand Kashan (1st week~9th week)
- Longest losing run: 5 Games Moble Karimi (1st week~5th week)

The 2015–16 Iranian Futsal 1st Division will be divided into two phases.

The league will also be composed of 20 teams divided into two divisions of 10 teams each, whose teams will be divided geographically. Teams will play only other teams in their own division, once at home and once away for a total of 14 matches each.

== Teams ==
Locations of clubs in 2015–16 Futsal 1st Division

=== Group A ===
Team	City	Venue	Capacity	Head coach	Past Season
Arjan Shiraz	Shiraz	Shahid Nasiri	-	(Iran) Hamid Reza Kamali	5th/Group Persian Gulf
Atoliyeh Tehran Qom	Qom	Behzisti	-	(Iran) Hossein Sabouri	Replaced for Arash Novin Iranian
Esteghlal Novin	Mahshahr	Besat	-	(Iran) Kiyavash Alasvand	6th/Group Persian Gulf
Moble Karimi	Karaj	Enghelab	-	(Iran) Seyed Mohammad Karimi	
Pas Qavamin	Tehran	Dastgerdi	-	(Iran) Masoud Kiyanfar	3rd/Group Khazar Sea
Shahrdari Neka	Neka	Sardar Tosi	2,500	(Iran) Reza Zarkhanli	8th/Group Khazar Sea
Shahrvand Kashan	Kashan	7th Tir	-	(Iran) Amir Zaer Emam	Replaced for Ayandeh Gostar Isfahan
Sunich Saveh	Saveh	-	-	(Iran) Vahid Ghiasi	

=== Group B ===
Team	City	Venue	Capacity	Head coach	Past Season
Azad University	Tehran	Payambar Azam	-	(Iran) Mahmoud Ghazi	4th/Group Khazar Sea
Bank Resalat Kerman	Kerman	Ostandari	-	(Iran) Mohsen Hakak	1st/Group Persian Gulf
Chakad Atiyeh Javan	Shahriar	Takhti Shahriar	-	(Iran) Masoud Naji	Promoted
Keshavarz Qazvin	Qazvin	Shahid Babaei	2,500	(Iran) Mahmoud Abdollahi	7th/Group Khazar Sea
Paj	Mashhad	-	-	(Iran) Hadi Parsanejad	Replaced for Pent House
Shahed Shiraz	Shiraz	22 Bahman	-	(Iran) Amir Hossein Barzegar	7th/Group Persian Gulf
Shahrdari Saveh	Saveh	Fajr-e Felestin	2,500	(Iran) Mohsen Khabiri	Relegated
Zagros Khozestan	Ahvaz	Jahad Keshavarzi	-	(Iran) Yaghoub Maraghi	3rd/Group Persian Gulf

Note: Paya Sazeh, Yaran Javan Bandar Abbas, Iran Jahan Mashhad and Bazargani Ideal Yazd Withdrew from the league before the start of competition.

== League standings ==
=== Group A ===
Pos	Team	Pld	W	D	L	GF	GA	GD	Pts	Qualification or relegation
1	Arjan (Q)	14	9	5	0	59	28	+31	32	Promoted playoff
2	Sunich (Q)	14	6	6	2	54	35	+19	24	Promoted playoff
3	Atoliyeh Tehran Qom	14	7	3	4	36	31	+5	24	
4	Pas Qavamin	14	6	3	5	40	38	+2	21	
5	Moble Karimi	14	6	0	8	41	49	−8	18	
6	Est. Novin Mahshahr	14	4	4	6	32	37	−5	16	
7	Sh. Neka	14	2	6	6	26	42	−16	12	
8	Shahrvand Kashan (R)	14	1	3	10	36	64	−28	6	Relegation to Iran Futsal's 2nd Division

Updated to match(es) played on 6 March 2016. Source: Futsal Casa
Rules for classification: 1) points; 2) goal difference; 3) number of goals scored.
(Q) Qualified for the phase indicated; (R) Relegated

=== Group B ===
Pos	Team	Pld	W	D	L	GF	GA	GD	Pts	Qualification or relegation
1	Azad University (Q)	14	9	4	1	52	31	+21	31	Promoted playoff
2	Sh. Saveh (Q)	14	9	2	3	52	30	+22	29	Promoted playoff
3	Zagros	14	9	2	3	47	32	+15	29	
4	Paj	14	7	1	6	35	40	−5	22	
5	Chakad Atiyeh	14	5	2	7	31	32	−1	17	
6	Bank Resalat	14	4	2	8	30	42	−12	14	
7	Shahed Shiraz	14	3	2	9	24	40	−16	11	
8	Keshavarz Qazvin (R)	14	2	1	11	27	51	−24	7	Relegation to Iran Futsal's 2nd Division

Updated to match(es) played on 6 March 2016. Source: Futsal Casa
Rules for classification: 1) points; 2) goal difference; 3) number of goals scored.
(Q) Qualified for the phase indicated; (R) Relegated

== Results table ==
=== Group A ===
Home \ Away	ARJ	ATQ	ESM	MKA	QAV	SHN	SHK	SUN
Arjan		3–1	8–3	12–6	6–2	2–2	5–3	3–3
Atoliyeh Tehran Qom	0–4		1–0	2–1	3–2	8–3	3–3	2–1
Est. Novin Mahshahr	1–1	1–1		3–0 (Note: Moble Karimi received a technical loss of 3-0 to Est. Novin Mahshahr)	3–0	9–2	1–4	2–2
Moble Karimi	0–4	2–1	5–3		4–2	1–2	8–4	1–4
Pas Qavamin	1–3	4–2	1–1	3–2		0–0	12–6	3–3
Sh. Neka	2–2	1–4	5–0	1–4	1–2		1–1	2–2
Shahrvand Kashan	0–2	1–3	2–4	3–4	3–5	2–2		1–10
Sunich	4–4	5–5	1–5	5–3	1–3	5–2	4–3	

Updated to match(es) played on 6 March 2016. Source:
Legend: Blue = home team win; Yellow = draw; Red = away team win.

=== Group B ===
Home \ Away	UNI	BRK	ATI	KSH	PAJ	SHS	SHA	ZAG
Azad University		4–0	3–2	6–3	3–2	4–4	3–2	5–5
Bank Resalat	3–1		4–1	1–1	3–4	3–1	2–2	2–3
Chakad Atiyeh	2–2	3–1		4–3	2–2	3–1	3–2	1–2
Keshavarz Qazvin	1–5	3–2	2–1		1–6	3–6	3–5	3–4
Paj	2–6	3–0 (Note: Bank Resalat received a technical loss of 3-0 to Paj)	3–2	4–2		1–2	4–1	2–1
Sh. Saveh	3–3	6–2	5–2	2–1	8–0		4–1	5–3
Shahed Shiraz	1–2	2–4	0–4	2–1	3–2	0–2		2–2
Zagros	1–5	7–3	2–1	3–0	6–0	4–2	4–1	

Updated to match(es) played on 6 March 2016. Source:
Legend: Blue = home team win; Yellow = draw; Red = away team win.

== Clubs season-progress ==
Win
Draw
Lose

Team ╲ Round	1	2	3	4	5	6	7	8	9	10	11	12	13	14
Arjan	W	D	W	D	W	W	W	W	D	W	D	D	W	W
Atoliyeh Tehran Qom	W	W	L	D	D	L	W	D	L	W	W	W	L	W
Azad University	W	L	D	W	D	D	W	W	W	D	W	W	W	W
Bank Resalat	L	W	L	L	L	L	W	W	L	W	L	D	L	D
Chakad Atiyeh	W	L	W	L	D	W	L	L	D	L	W	L	W	L
Est. Novin Mahshahr	L	W	W	D	L	W	L	D	D	L	W	D	L	W
Keshavarz Qazvin	L	L	L	L	W	L	L	W	L	L	L	D	L	L
Moble Karimi	L	L	L	L	L	W	W	L	W	L	W	W	W	L
Paj	L	W	L	W	L	W	L	L	D	W	W	W	W	L
Pas Qavamin	D	L	W	W	W	D	L	W	D	L	L	W	W	L
Sh. Neka	D	D	L	D	W	L	L	L	D	D	D	L	W	L
Sh. Saveh	W	W	D	W	L	W	W	L	W	D	L	W	W	W
Shahed Shiraz	D	L	W	L	W	L	L	L	L	W	L	L	L	D
Shahrvand Kashan	L	D	L	D	L	L	L	L	D	W	L	L	L	L
Sunich	W	D	W	D	D	D	W	W	D	D	L	L	L	W
Zagros	D	W	W	W	W	D	W	W	W	L	W	L	L	W

== Play-off ==
Pos	Team	Pld	W	D	L	GF	GA	GD	Pts	Promotion	ARJ	SHS	UNI	SUN
1	Arjan (C, P)	6	3	2	1	25	20	+5	11	Iranian Futsal Super League		6–5	1–2	6–3
2	Sh. Saveh (P)	6	3	2	1	21	18	+3	11	Iranian Futsal Super League	2–2		2–2	6–5
3	Azad University	6	3	1	2	24	15	+9	10		4–6	2–3		8–0
4	Sunich	6	0	1	5	16	33	−17	1		4–4	1–3	3–6	

Updated to match(es) played on 20 May 2016. Source: Futsal Casa
Rules for classification: 1) points; 2) goal difference; 3) number of goals scored.
(C) Champions; (P) Promoted

=== Clubs season-progress ===
Win
Draw
Lose

Team ╲ Round	1	2	3	4	5	6
Arjan	W	W	D	L	D	W
Azad University	L	W	D	W	W	L
Sh. Saveh	W	L	D	W	D	W
Sunich	L	L	D	L	L	L

== See also ==
- 2015–16 Futsal Super League
- 2016 Futsal's 2nd Division
- 2015–16 Iran Pro League
- 2015–16 Azadegan League
- 2015–16 Iran Football's 2nd Division
- 2015–16 Iran Football's 3rd Division
- 2015–16 Hazfi Cup
- Iranian Super Cup
