= Iran Futsal's 1st Division =

- Country: Iran
- Confederation: AFC
- Divisions: 2
- Number of clubs: 26
- Level on pyramid: 2
- Promotion to: Iranian Futsal Super League
- Relegation to: 2nd Division
- Broadcaster(s): IRIB
- Website: IRIFF.ir
- Current: 2023–24 Iran Futsal's 1st Division

The Iran Futsal's 1st Division (Persian: ليگ دسته یک فوتسال ایران) is the second-highest division overall in the Iranian futsal league system after the Super League.

== League Champions ==
- 2002–03: Rah Ahan
- 2003–04: Tam Iran Khodro
- 2004–05: Elmo Adab
- 2005–06: not held
- 2006–07: Felamingo - Shohada Zoghalsang
- 2007–08: Melli Haffari - Labaniyat Arjan
- 2008–09: Firooz Sofeh - Shahr Aftab
- 2009–10: Persepolis - Arash Beton
- 2010–11: Shahrdari Saveh - Misagh
- 2011–12: Shahrdari Tabriz - Gaz Khuzestan
- 2012–13: Giti Pasand Novin - Tasisat Daryaei
- 2013–14: Ferdosi - Moghavemat Alborz
- 2014–15: Kashi Nilou
- 2015–16: Labaniyat Arjan
- 2016–17: Moghavemat Qarchak
- 2017–18: Sunich
- 2018–19: Shahin
- 2019–20: Foodka
- 2020–21: Zandi Beton
- 2021–22: Gohar Zamin
- 2022–23: Shahrdari Saveh
- 2023–24:

== See also ==
- Iranian Futsal Super League
- Iran Futsal's 2nd Division
- IPL
- Azadegan League
- Iran Football's 2nd Division
- Iran Football's 3rd Division
- Iranian Super Cup
- Hazfi Cup
