= Gostaresh Foolad Tabriz FSC =

Gostaresh Foolad
- Full name: Gostaresh Foolad Kowsar Tabriz Futsal Club
- Founded: 2008
- Dissolved: 2012
- Ground: Shahid Pour Sharifi Arena, Tabriz
- Capacity: 6,000
- Owner: Mohammad Reza Zenozi Motlagh
- Chairman: (Iran) Gholam Reza Samandar
- Head Coach: (Iran) Mir Masoum Sohrabi
- Website: https://web.archive.org/web/20120724152817/http://intro.gftclub.ir/

Gostaresh Foolad Kowsar Tabriz Futsal Club (Persian: باشگاه فوتسال گسترش فولاد کوثر تبریز) was an Iranian futsal club based in Tabriz. In June 2012 Gostaresh Foolad terminated their futsal activities. Hilal Ahmar Tabriz took over their license.

== Season-by-season ==
The table below chronicles the achievements of the Club in various competitions.

Season	League	Position	Notes
2008–09	Futsal Super League	6th	bought Sazman Bazargani Azarbayjan Sharghi
2009–10	Futsal Super League	6th
2010-11	Futsal Super League	5th
2011–12	Futsal Super League	5th

== Current squad 2011-12 ==
Note: Flags indicate national team as defined under FIFA eligibility rules; some limited exceptions apply. Players may hold more than one non-FIFA nationality.

No.	Pos.	Nation	Player
1	GK	(Iran) IRN	Yaghob Filgosh
2		(Iran) IRN	Babak Akbari
3		(Iran) IRN	Ramin Rostamiyan
6		(Iran) IRN	Shahram Sharifzadeh
7		(Iran) IRN	Behnam Ataei
8		(Iran) IRN	Afshin Sepah
9		(Iran) IRN	Amar Mosaferi
10		(Iran) IRN	Majid Zarei (Captain)
12		(Iran) IRN	Ahmad Safari

No.	Pos.	Nation	Player
14		(Iran) IRN	Babak Nasiri
15		(Iran) IRN	Mostafa Ekhlasiyan
16		(Iran) IRN	Morteza Ezati
17		(Iran) IRN	Rashid Gholipour
18		(Iran) IRN	Moslem Rostamiha
22		(Iran) IRN	Naser Esmaeili
23		(Iran) IRN	Amir Gafari
32	GK	(Iran) IRN	Seyed Javad Montazar
40		(Iran) IRN	Seyed Hatef Seyed Ganbari

== See also ==
- Gostaresh Foolad F.C.
