= Labaniyat Arjan Shiraz FSC =

Iranian futsal club

Labaniyat Arjan
- Full name: Labaniyat Arjan Shiraz Futsal Club
- Founded: 2005; 21 years ago
- Ground: Shahid Abolfathi Indoor Stadium, Shiraz
- League: Iran Futsal's 2nd Division

Labaniyat Arjan Shiraz Futsal Club (Persian: باشگاه فوتسال لبنیات ارژن شیراز) is an Iranian professional futsal club based in Shiraz.

== Season by season ==
The table below chronicles the achievements of the Club in various competitions.

Season	League	Position	Hazfi	Notes
2006–07	1st Division	??
2007–08	1st Division	1st / Group B		Promoted Play Off
2008–09	Super League	8th
2009–10	Super League	10th
2010–11	Super League	6th
2011–12	Super League	10th
2012–13	Super League	13th		Relegation
2013–14	1st Division	3rd/Group B	Withdrew
2014–15	1st Division	5th/Group Persian Gulf
2015–16	1st Division	1st / Group A		Promoted Play Off
2016–17	Super League	8th
2017–18	Super League	12th
2018–19	Super League	10th
2019–20	Super League	11th

Last updated: July 8, 2021

Champions	Runners-up	Third Place	Fourth Place	Relegation	Promoted	Did not qualify	not held

== Honours ==
- Iran Futsal's 1st Division
  - Champions (2): 2007–08, 2015–16
