= Keshavarz Qazvin FSC =

Iranian futsal club

Keshavarz
- Full name: Keshavarz Qazvin Futsal Club
- Ground: Shahid Babaei; Qazvin
- Capacity: 2500

Keshavarz Qazvin Futsal Club (Persian: باشگاه فوتسال کشاورز قزوین) was an Iranian professional Futsal club based in Qazvin.

== History ==
The club was originally known as Felamingo Qazvin. In the half season of 2007–08 Iranian Futsal Super League it was renamed Poushineh Baft Qazvin due to change of sponsorship. Did not participate in the 2010-11 due to financial problems and lack of sponsorship. in the 2011–12 Iran Futsal's 1st Division they were renamed again to Heyat Football Qazvin. In the 2013–14 Iran Futsal's 1st Division it was renamed Keshavarz Qazvin due to change of sponsorship.

== Season-by-season ==
The table below chronicles the achievements of the Club in various competitions.

Season	League	Position	Hazfi	Notes
2004–05	1st Division	?
2005-06	Not held
2006–07	1st Division	?		Promoted
2007–08	Super League	11th
2008–09	Super League	7th
2009–10	Super League	11th
2010–11	Super League	Withdrew from the league		Relegation
2011–12	1st Division	3rd / Group A
2012–13	1st Division	2nd / Group A		Promoted Play Off
2013–14	1st Division	3rd / Group A	Withdrew
2014–15	1st Division	7th / Group Khazar Sea
2015–16	1st Division	8th / Group B		Relegation

Last updated: May 2, 2021

Champions	Runners-up	Third Place	Fourth Place	Relegation	Promoted	Did not qualify	not held
