= 2006–07 Iran Futsal's 1st Division =

Iran Futsal's 1st Division
- Season: 2006–07
- Promoted: Felamingo; Zoghalsang

The 2006–07 Iranian Futsal 1st Division was divided into two phases.

The league was composed of 16 teams divided into two divisions of 8 teams each, whose teams were divided geographically. Teams play other teams in their own division, once at home and once away for a total of 14 matches, each.

== Teams ==
=== Group A ===
Team	City
Dabiri	Tabriz
Sanaye Choub Mahboubi	Amol
Felamingo	Qazvin
Nemouneh Restaurant	Qazvin
Sanaye Sang	Tonekabon
Hilal Ahmar	Qom
Hilal Ahmar	Tabriz
Daneshgah Oloum Pezeshki	Qom

=== Group B ===
Team	City
Persepolis	Ahvaz
Daryanavardan	Bushehr
Zoghalsang	Kerman
Chehel Sotoun	Isfahan
Moghavemat	Shiraz
Chini Hamgam	Shahrekord
Labaniyat Arjan	Shiraz
Tose Neyshekar	Ahvaz

== Play Off ==
Team 1	Agg.	Team 2	1st leg	2nd leg
Labaniyat Arjan	7-17	Felamingo	4-4	3-13

Felamingo Promoted to the Super League.

=== First leg ===
Labaniyat Arjan	4 - 4	Felamingo

, Shiraz

=== Return leg ===
March 17, 2007

Felamingo	13 - 3	Labaniyat Arjan
	Report

Shahid Babaei Arena, Qazvin

Team 1	Agg.	Team 2	1st leg	2nd leg
Zoghalsang	13-10	Hilal Ahmar	6-7	7-3

Zoghalsang Promoted to the Super League.

=== First leg ===
Hilal Ahmar	7 - 6	Zoghalsang

Tabriz

=== Return leg ===
March 15, 2007

Zoghalsang	7 - 3	Hilal Ahmar
Majid Hosseini 2 Arash Shini 2 Javad Asghari Moghaddam; Meysam Mozaffari; Hadi Abdollahi	Report	Nima Aliyari; Abolfazl Arjmandi; Amir Ghaffari

Shahid Tajali Arena, Kerman
Referee: Alireza Rajabi

== See also ==
- 2006–07 Persian Gulf Cup
- 2007 Iran Futsal's 2nd Division
- 2006–07 Azadegan League
- 2006–07 Iran Football's 2nd Division
- 2006–07 Iran Football's 3rd Division
- 2006–07 Hazfi Cup
- Iranian Super Cup
