= Kashi Nilou Isfahan FSC =

Iranian futsal club

- Full name: Kashi Nilou Isfahan Futsal Club
- Dissolved: 2015
- Owner: Nilou Taile Co.
- Chairman: (Iran) Mohammad Ali Talebi
- Head Coach: (Iran) Reza Sadeghi
- League: Iranian Futsal Super League
- 2015–16: 14th

Kashi Nilou Isfahan Futsal Club (Persian: باشگاه فوتسال کاشی نیلو اصفهان) was an Iranian futsal club based in Isfahan.

== History ==
=== 2015-16 ===
Kashi Nilou terminated their sports activities due to financial problems in half season 2015-16.

== Season-by-season ==
The table below chronicles the achievements of the Club in various competitions.

Season	League	Position	Hazfi	Notes
2013-14	1st Div	4th / Group A	Withdrew
2014-15	1st Div	1st		Promoted
2015–16	Super League	14th		Withdrew from the League in half season
