= 2013–14 Iran Futsal's 1st Division =

Iranian Futsal 1st Division
- Season: 2013–14
- Champions: Moghavemat Alborz; Ferdosi
- Promoted: Moghavemat Alborz; Ferdosi
- Relegated: Bargh Shiraz; Iran Jahan; Kiyan Pelast; Naft Omidiyeh
- Matches: 148
- Goals: 818 (5.53 per match)
- Biggest home win: Arjan 20 – 2 Kiyan Pelast (17th week)
- Biggest away win: Zagros 1 – 6 Arjan (1st week); Sh. Isfahan 0 – 5 Moghavemat Alborz (8th week)
- Highest scoring: Arjan 20 – 2 Kiyan Pelast (17th week)
- Longest winning run: 6 Games; Sh. Isfahan (10th week~16th week)
- Longest unbeaten run: 9 Games; Moghavemat Alborz (1st week~10th week)
- Longest winless run: 16 Games; Bargh Shiraz (1st week~18th week)
- Longest losing run: 8 Games; Bargh Shiraz (10tt week~18th week)

The 2013–14 Iranian Futsal 1st Division will be divided into two phases.

The league will also be composed of 18 teams divided into two divisions of 9 teams each, whose teams will be divided geographically. Teams will play only other teams in their own division, once at home and once away for a total of 14 matches each.

== Teams ==
Locations of clubs in 2013–14 Futsal 1st Division

=== Group A ===
Team	City	Venue	Capacity	Head coach	Past Season
Ali Sadr	Hamedan	Enghelab Hamedan	–	(Iran) Alireza Khosravi	Promoted
Bargh Shiraz	Shiraz	22nd Bahman	–	–	3rd/Group B
Borna Khozestan	Ahvaz	Git Bostan	–	(Iran) Heydar Farhadi	Replaced for DIET Shiraz
Eisatis Yazd	Yazd	Shahediyeh	–	–	6th/Group B
Iran Jahan	Mashhad	Fayaz Bakhsh	–	–	Replaced for Shahrvand Babol
Kashi Nilou	Isfahan	Pirouzi	4,300	(Iran) Ahmad Baghbanbashi	Replaced for Foolad Mahan
Keshavarz Qazvin^{1}	Qazvin	Shahid Babaei	2,500	(Iran) Mahmoud Abdullahi	2nd/Group B
Moghavemat Kerman	Kerman	–	–	–	5th/Group B
Persepolis Behzisti	Tehran	–	–	(Iran) Vahid Nemat-Allahi	Relegated

- ^{1} Heyat Football Qazvin Renamed to Keshavarz Qazvin

=== Group B ===
Team	City	Venue	Capacity	Head coach	Past Season
Arjan Shiraz	Shiraz	Shahid Abolfathi Arena	–	(Iran) Hamid Reza Kamali	Relegated
Ferdosi Mashhad	Mashhad	Shahid Beheshti	6,000	–	7th/Group A
Kiyan Pelast Sepahan Kashan	Kashan	–	–	–	5th/Group A
Moghavemat Alborz	Karaj	Enghelab	-	-	Promoted
Naft Omidiyeh	Omidiyeh	Velayat	–	–	4th/Group A
Nik Andish Shahrdari Isfahan	Isfahan	Pirouzi	4,300	(Iran) Alireza Afzal	1st/Group B
Penthouse Mashhad	Mashhad	Fayaz Bakhsh	–	(Iran) Hamid Bigham	Replaced for Roghan Motor Simorgh
Shahrdari Neka	Neka	Sardar Tosi	2,500	(Iran) Mahdi Nemati	7th/Group B
Zagros Khozestan	Ahvaz	-	–	–	Replaced for Firooz Sofeh

== League standings ==
=== Group A ===
Pos	Team	Pld	W	D	L	GF	GA	GD	Pts	Qualification or relegation
1	Eisatis Yazd	16	9	4	3	39	24	+15	31	Promoted playoff
2	Persepolis Behzisti	16	9	3	4	63	42	+21	30	Promoted playoff
3	Keshavarz Qazvin	16	9	3	4	51	38	+13	30	
4	Kashi Nilou	16	7	5	4	42	40	+2	26	
5	Moghavemat Kerman	16	6	4	6	45	37	+8	22	
6	Ali Sadr	16	5	6	5	51	47	+4	21	
7	Borna Khozestan	16	6	2	8	36	52	−16	20	
8	Iran Jahan	16	6	0	10	31	47	−16	18	Relegation to 2015 Iran Futsal's 2nd Division
9	Bargh Shiraz	16	0	3	13	23	54	−31	3	Relegation to 2015 Iran Futsal's 2nd Division

Updated to match(es) played on 20 February 2014. Source: Futsal Iran.IR
Rules for classification: 1) points; 2) goal difference; 3) number of goals scored.

=== Group B ===
Pos	Team	Pld	W	D	L	GF	GA	GD	Pts	Qualification or relegation
1	Moghavemat Alborz	16	11	2	3	64	44	+20	35	Promoted playoff
2	Ferdosi	16	8	4	4	36	34	+2	28	Promoted playoff
3	Arjan	16	8	3	5	63	37	+26	27	
4	Sh. Isfahan	16	8	2	6	44	30	+14	26	
5	Pent House	16	8	1	7	44	34	+10	25	
6	Sh. Neka	16	6	2	8	38	40	−2	20	
7	Zagros	16	6	2	8	39	58	−19	20	
8	Naft Omidiyeh	16	4	2	10	46	56	−10	14	Relegation to 2015 Iran Futsal's 2nd Division
9	Kiyan Pelast	16	2	4	10	42	83	−41	10	Relegation to 2015 Iran Futsal's 2nd Division

Updated to match(es) played on 20 February 2014. Source: Futsal Iran.IR
Rules for classification: 1) points; 2) goal difference; 3) number of goals scored.

== Results table ==
=== Group A ===
Home \ Away	ALI	BGH	BOR	EIS	JAH	NIL	KSH	MOK	PRS
Ali Sadr		5–5	5–2	1–1	2–0	1–2	2–2	2–2	3–3
Bargh Shiraz	3–7		0–0	1–3	3–4	1–2	1–2	0–3	2–2
Borna Khozestan	4–2	4–0		1–2	2–6	1–2	5–1	2–1	1–1
Eisatis Yazd	3–2	4–1	2–3		4–2	2–2	0–1	1–1	6–5
Iran Jahan	3–2	3–2	1–2	0–5		3–1	2–3	3–2	0–3 (Note: The game score was 2–1 in favor of Iran Jahan)
Kashi Nilou	5–5	4–3	5–2	0–0	4–0		1–5	4–3	2–4
Keshavarz Qazvin	3–4	3–0 (Note: Bargh Shiraz received a technical loss of 3–0 to Keshavarz Qazvin)	10–2	3–2	4–2	3–3		2–2	5–3
Moghavemat Kerman	7–3	4–1	3–2	0–1	3–1	3–3	4–2		4–5
Persepolis Behzisti	2–5	4–0	11–3	1–3	5–1	4–3	5–2	5–3	

Updated to match(es) played on 20 February 2014. Source:
Legend: Blue = home team win; Yellow = draw; Red = away team win.

=== Group B ===
Home \ Away	ARJ	FER	KIA	MOA	NAF	PEN	SHI	SHN	ZAG
Arjan		2–3	20–2	3–3	5–4	3–2	1–1	4–2	1–4
Ferdosi	3–1		3–3	3–2	3–2	4–2	1–1	3–3	1–0
Kiyan Pelast	3–6	2–3		2–6	3–5	1–4	1–2	3–2	4–4
Moghavemat Alborz	4–3	5–2	6–6		4–2	2–1	3–0	3–1	5–3
Naft Omidiyeh	0–3 (Note: The game score was 3–2 in favor of Naft Omidiyeh)	2–2	6–4	2–4		2–3	1–3	1–3	5–4
Pent House	0–0	3–1	4–1	9–3	2–4		2–0	4–1	3–0
Sh. Isfahan	2–3	1–0	6–0	0–5	3–4	8–4		2–0	12–2
Sh. Neka	3–2	4–0 (Note: The game score was 4–1 in favor of Sh. Neka until the 19:56 minute of second half.)	2–2	3–6	4–3	3–1	0–1		6–3
Zagros	3–6	1–4	4–2	4–3	3–3	1–0	3–2	2–1	

Updated to match(es) played on 20 February 2014. Source:
Legend: Blue = home team win; Yellow = draw; Red = away team win.

== Clubs season-progress ==
	Win
	Draw
	Lose
	Bye
W/O	Withdrew

Team ╲ Round	1	2	3	4	5	6	7	8	9	10	11	12	13	14	15	16	17	18
Ali Sadr	B	L	L	W	D	L	W	W	D	B	W	D	D	L	D	L	D	W
Arjan	W	W	L	W	D	D	B	W	D	L	L	L	W	W	L	B	W	W
Bargh Shiraz	D	L	D	L	L	L	L	B	D	L	L	L	L	L	L	W/O	B	L
Borna Khozestan	D	W	B	L	D	W	W	W	W	W	L	B	L	L	L	L	L	L
Eisatis Yazd	W	W	L	W	D	L	D	W	B	D	W	L	W	W	W	D	W	B
Ferdosi	W	L	W	W	D	W	D	B	D	L	W	W	D	L	W	L	B	W
Iran Jahan	W	L	W	B	L	W	L	L	L	L	L	L	B	L	W	W	W	W
Kashi Nilou	D	W	W	W	B	L	D	D	W	L	W	D	W	B	L	D	W	L
Keshavarz Qazvin	D	L	W	L	W	B	W	L	L	W	W	W	D	W	B	W	D	W
Kiyan Pelast	L	D	D	L	L	L	D	L	B	L	L	W	D	W	L	L	L	B
Moghavemat Alborz	W	W	W	W	B	D	D	W	W	W	L	W	L	B	W	W	W	L
Moghavemat Kerman	L	B	L	W	W	W	L	D	L	D	B	W	D	W	D	W	L	L
Naft Omidiyeh	B	W	L	L	W	W	W	L	D	B	L	L	L	L	L	D	L	L
Pent House	L	L	B	L	D	W	W	L	W	W	W	B	W	L	W	L	W	L
Persepolis Behzisti	L	W	D	L	D	W	B	L	W	W	L	W	D	W	W	B	L	W
Sh. Isfahan	W	B	L	W	D	L	L	L	D	W	B	W	W	W	W	W	L	L
Sh. Neka	L	L	D	L	W	B	D	W	L	L	W	L	L	L	B	W	W	W
Zagros	L	D	W	B	L	L	L	W	L	W	W	L	B	W	L	D	L	W

== Play-off ==
Team 1	Agg.	Team 2	1st leg	2nd leg
Persepolis Behzisti	5–9	Moghavemat Alborz	3–5	2–4
Eisatis Yazd	0–4	Ferdosi Mashhad	0–4	(w/o)^{1}

Winner Promoted to the Super League.
^{1} Eisatis Yazd withdrew after 1st leg.

=== First leg ===
8 June 2014	Persepolis Behzisti	3–5	Moghavemat Alborz	Tehran
17:00				Stadium: Elmo Sanat University Arena

13 June 2014	Ferdosi Mashhad	4–0	Eisatis Yazd	Mashhad
17:00	Mohammad Shamaei 3 Davoud Abbasi			Stadium: Kragaran Arena

=== Return leg ===
13 June 2014	Moghavemat Alborz	4–2	Persepolis Behzisti	Karaj
17:00	Amin Nasrolah 2 Ali Abdin; Majid Khazaei			Stadium: Enghelab Arena

20 June 2014	Eisatis Yazd	0–3 (w/o)	Ferdosi Mashhad	Yazd
17:00				Stadium: Edalat Arena

== See also ==
- 2013–14 Iranian Futsal Super League
- 2014 Iran Futsal's 2nd Division
- 2013–14 Iranian Futsal Hazfi Cup
- 2013–14 Persian Gulf Cup
- 2013–14 Azadegan League
- 2013–14 Iran Football's 2nd Division
- 2013–14 Iran Football's 3rd Division
- 2013–14 Hazfi Cup
- Iranian Super Cup
