= Firooz Sofeh FSC =

Iranian futsal club

Firooz Sofeh
- Full name: Firooz Sofeh Futsal Club
- Founded: 2008
- Dissolved: 17 July 2012
- Ground: Pirouzi Arena, Isfahan
- Capacity: 4,300
- Website: http://fooladmahansports.com/

Firooz Sofeh Isfahan Futsal Club (Persian: باشگاه فوتسال فیروز صفه اصفهان) was an Iranian futsal club based in Isfahan.

== Season-by-season ==
The table below chronicles the achievements of the Club in various competitions.

Season	League	Position	Notes
2008–09	1st Division	2nd	Promoted
2009–10	Futsal Super League	8th
2010-11	Futsal Super League	4th
2011–12	Futsal Super League	7th
2012–13	Futsal Super League	Dissolved

== Famous players ==
- (Iran) Ghodrat Bahadori
- (Iran) Mostafa Tayyebi
- (Iran) Javad Asghari Moghaddam
