= Zam Zam Isfahan FSC =

Iranian futsal club

- Full name: Zam Zam Isfahan Club
- Nickname(s): Zam Zam
- Founded: July 17, 2010
- Dissolved: 2014
- Ground: Pirouzi, Isfahan
- Capacity: 4,300
- Owner: Zam Zam Isfahan Co.
- Head Coach: (Iran) Hossein Afzali
- League: Iranian Futsal Super League
- 2013-14: 12th

Zam Zam Isfahan Futsal Club (Persian: باشگاه فوتسال زمزم اصفهان) is an Iranian futsal club based in Isfahan.

== History ==
=== Establishment ===
The club was originally known as Sanaye Giti Pasand Novin Isfahan, In the August 27, 2013, it was renamed Zam Zam Isfahan due to change of sponsorship.

=== Dissolution of Zam Zam ===
In July 2014 Zam Zam terminated their sports activities due to financial problems. Rah Sari futsal club owned by Saeed Najarian took over their license. The new club was named Shahrvand Sari.

== Season-by-season ==
The table below chronicles the achievements of the Club in various competitions.

Season	League	Position	Hazfi	Notes
2011	2nd Division	7th/Group B
2012	2nd Division	2nd/Group B		Promoted
2012-13	1st Division	1st/Group A		Promoted
2013-14	Super League	12th	Withdrew

== Honors ==
National:

- Iran Futsal's 1st Division
  - Champions (1): 2012-13
- Iran Futsal's 2nd Division
  - Runners-up (1): 2012
