= 2009–10 Iran Futsal's 1st Division =

Iranian Futsal 1st Division
- Season: 2009–10
- Promoted: Persepolis; Arash Beton Qazvin
- Relegated: Saipa Ardabil; Saman Saz
- Matches: 116
- Goals: 767 (6.61 per match)
- Biggest home win: Farsh Ara 9 – 4 Sanaye Mahboubi
- Biggest away win: Zar Sim Saveh 1 – 8 Bonyad Maskan
- Highest scoring: Farsh Ara 9 – 4 Sanaye Mahboubi; Bonyad Maskan 8 – 5 Gaz Khuzestan

The 2009–10 Iranian Futsal 1st Division will be divided into two phases, the regular season, played from 13 November 2009.

The league will also be composed of 16 teams divided into two divisions of 8 teams each, whose teams will be divided geographically. Teams will play only other teams in their own division, once at home and once away for a total of 14 matches each.

== Teams ==
Locations of clubs in 2010–11 Futsal 1st Division

=== Group A ===
| Team | City | Past Season |
|---|---|---|
| Arash Beton Qazvin | Takestan | Replaced for Hefazati Shab |
| Dabiri Tabriz | Tabriz | |
| Farsh Ara Mashhad | Mashhad | |
| Saipa Ardebil | Ardebil | |
| Sanaye Mahbobi Amol | Amol | |
| Sepah Shohada Urmia | Urmia | |
| Shahrdari Tabriz | Tabriz | |
| Shahrvand Babol | Babol | |

=== Group B ===
| Team | City | Past Season |
|---|---|---|
| Bonyad Maskan Shiraz | Shiraz | |
| Saman Saz Arak^{1} | Arak | Replaced for Romatism Tehran |
| Gaz Khozestan | Ahvaz | Promoted |
| Heyat Roustaei va Ashayeri Qom | Qom | |
| Jame Jam Yazd | Yazd | |
| Moghavemat Fars | Shiraz | |
| Persepolis | Tehran | |
| Zar Sim Saveh | Saveh | |

- ^{1} Fakhr Aluminium Arak terminated their sports activities due to financial problems. Saman Saz Arak took over their license.

== League standings ==
=== Group A ===
| Pos | Team | Pld | W | D | L | GF | GA | GD | Pts | Qualification or relegation |
|---|---|---|---|---|---|---|---|---|---|---|
| 1 | Dabiri Tabriz | 14 | 9 | 2 | 3 | 57 | 35 | +22 | 29 | Promoted playoff |
| 2 | Arash Beton | 14 | 8 | 4 | 2 | 48 | 37 | +11 | 28 | Promoted playoff |
| 3 | Farsh Ara | 14 | 8 | 3 | 3 | 58 | 38 | +20 | 27 | |
| 4 | Sepah Shohada Urmia | 14 | 5 | 3 | 6 | 49 | 46 | +3 | 18 | |
| 5 | Shahrvand Babol | 14 | 5 | 3 | 6 | 37 | 36 | +1 | 18 | |
| 6 | Sh. Tabriz | 14 | 5 | 2 | 7 | 37 | 50 | −13 | 17 | |
| 7 | Sanaye Mahbobi Amol | 14 | 2 | 4 | 8 | 31 | 50 | −19 | 10 | |
| 8 | Saipa Ardebil | 14 | 3 | 1 | 10 | 40 | 68 | −28 | 10 | Relegation to 2nd Division |

Updated to match(es) played on 9 February 2010. Source:
Rules for classification: 1) points; 2) goal difference; 3) number of goals scored.

=== Group B ===
| Pos | Team | Pld | W | D | L | GF | GA | GD | Pts | Qualification or relegation |
|---|---|---|---|---|---|---|---|---|---|---|
| 1 | Gaz Khozestan | 14 | 9 | 2 | 3 | 60 | 47 | +13 | 29 | Promoted playoff |
| 2 | Persepolis | 14 | 8 | 3 | 3 | 44 | 29 | +15 | 27 | Promoted playoff |
| 3 | Moghavemat Fars | 14 | 7 | 3 | 4 | 42 | 39 | +3 | 24 | |
| 4 | Bonyad Maskan Shiraz | 14 | 7 | 2 | 5 | 63 | 52 | +11 | 23 | |
| 5 | Jame Jam | 14 | 4 | 4 | 6 | 49 | 49 | 0 | 16 | |
| 6 | Zar Sim Saveh | 14 | 3 | 5 | 6 | 39 | 50 | −11 | 14 | |
| 7 | Heyat Roustaei va Ashayeri | 14 | 3 | 3 | 8 | 44 | 56 | −12 | 12 | |
| 8 | Saman Saz | 14 | 3 | 2 | 9 | 39 | 57 | −18 | 11 | Relegation to 2nd Division |

Updated to match(es) played on 9 February 2010. Source:
Rules for classification: 1) points; 2) goal difference; 3) number of goals scored.

== Results table ==
=== Group A ===
| Home \ Away | ARS | DAB | ARA | SIA | MAH | SEP | SHT | SHR |
|---|---|---|---|---|---|---|---|---|
| Arash Beton | | 0–3 | 4–3 | 8–3 | 4–1 | 4–3 | 4–3 | 3–3 |
| Dabiri Tabriz | 2–5 | | 6–3 | 7–2 | 6–1 | 6–2 | 5–1 | 5–4 |
| Farsh Ara | 4–0 | 7–2 | | 5–3 | 9–4 | 6–5 | 5–2 | 1–1 |
| Saipa Ardebil | 3–7 | 2–7 | 2–4 | | 3–2 | 3–4 | 4–5 | 4–3 |
| Sanaye Mahbobi Amol | 1–1 | 2–2 | 0–3 | 4–4 | | 1–1 | 4–2 | 5–2 |
| Sepah Shohada Urmia | 4–4 | 3–4 | 4–4 | 5–1 | 4–2 | | 6–2 | 5–4 |
| Sh. Tabriz | 1–1 | 2–1 | 3–3 | 5–3 | 5–4 | 3–2 | | 2–4 |
| Shahrvand Babol | 0–3 (Note: Shahrvand Babol received a technical loss of 3–0 to Arash Beton.) | 1–1 | 2–1 | 2–3 | 4–0 | 3–2 | 4–1 | |

Updated to match(es) played on 9 February 2010. Source:
Legend: Blue = home team win; Yellow = draw; Red = away team win.

=== Group B ===
| Home \ Away | BMS | GAZ | RVA | JAM | MOG | PRS | SAM | ZAR |
|---|---|---|---|---|---|---|---|---|
| Bonyad Maskan Shiraz | | 8–5 | 6–3 | 8–5 | 1–2 | 2–2 | 5–3 | 4–3 |
| Gaz Khozestan | 8–3 | | 7–4 | 3–1 | 4–2 | 3–1 | 6–1 | 6–5 |
| Heyat Roustaei va Ashayeri | 5–4 | 4–4 | | 4–3 | 2–3 | 2–3 | 6–1 | 3–3 |
| Jame Jam | 5–5 | 5–3 | 3–2 | | 4–5 | 4–5 | 6–1 | 3–3 |
| Moghavemat Fars | 2–6 | 1–3 | 5–4 | 1–3 | | 2–2 | 6–1 | 3–3 |
| Persepolis | 5–1 | 3–4 | 3–1 | 2–1 | 1–1 | | 6–1 | 4–2 |
| Saman Saz | 3–2 | 6–2 | 8–4 | 3–3 | 1–4 | 3–8 | | 3–5 |
| Zar Sim Saveh | 1–8 | 2–2 | 1–3 | 3–3 | 3–5 | 3–2 | 6–1 | |

Updated to match(es) played on 9 February 2010. Source:
Legend: Blue = home team win; Yellow = draw; Red = away team win.

== Play-off ==
| Team 1 | Agg. | Team 2 | 1st leg | 2nd leg |
|---|---|---|---|---|
| Persepolis | 9–5 | Dabiri Tabriz | 7–5 | 2–0 |

Persepolis Promoted to the Super League.

=== First leg ===
| Persepolis | 7–5 | Dabiri Tabriz |
|---|---|---|
| M. Heidarian 2 A. Sedigh 2 M.zarei; S. Parsi; K. Mohammadi |

Saha Tehran Arena, Tehran

=== Return leg ===
15 April 2010

| Dabiri Tabriz | 0–2 | Persepolis |
|---|---|---|
| | Report | Mohsen zarei Kazem Mohammadi |

Olom Pezeshki Arena, Tabriz
Referee: Alireza Sohrabi

| Team 1 | Agg. | Team 2 | 1st leg | 2nd leg |
|---|---|---|---|---|
| Gaz Khozestan | 8–8 | Arash Beton Qazvin | 3–4 | 5–4 |

Arash Beton Qazvin Promoted to the Super League.

=== First leg ===
| Arash Beton Qazvin | 4–3 | Gaz Khozestan |

Qazvin

=== Return leg ===
| Gaz Khozestan | 5–4 | Arash Beton Qazvin |
|---|---|---|
| | Report |

Ahvaz

== See also ==
- 2009–10 Iranian Futsal Super League
- 2010 Iran Futsal's 2nd Division
- 2009–10 Persian Gulf Cup
- 2009–10 Azadegan League
- 2009–10 Iran Football's 2nd Division
- 2009–10 Iran Football's 3rd Division
- 2009–10 Hazfi Cup
- Iranian Super Cup
