= 2008–09 Iran Futsal's 1st Division =

Iranian Futsal 1st Division
- Season: 2008–09
- Promoted: Firooz Sofeh; Shahr Aftab

The 2008–09 Iranian Futsal 1st Division will be divided into two phases.

The league will also be composed of 18 teams divided into two divisions of 9 teams each, whose teams will be divided geographically. Teams will play only other teams in their own division, once at home and once away for a total of 18 matches each.

== Teams ==
=== Group A ===
| Team | City | Past Season |
|---|---|---|
| Azad University | Tehran | Relegated |
| Dabiri Tabriz | Tabriz | |
| Esteghlal | Tehran | Relegated |
| Fajr Ghaem Galoogah | Galoogah | |
| Farsh Ara | Mashhad | |
| Hefazati Shab | Qazvin | |
| Petroshimi Tabriz | Tabriz | Replaced for Azar Ab |
| Shahr Aftab | Tehran | |
| Sanaye Mahbobi Amol | Amol | |

=== Group B ===
| Team | City | Past Season |
|---|---|---|
| Bonyad Maskan Shiraz | Shiraz | Promoted |
| Faraz Qom | Qom | |
| Firooz Sofeh | Isfahan | |
| Moghavemat Fars | Shiraz | |
| Moghavemat Shahrekord | Shahrekord | |
| Nirogah Yazd | Yazd | |
| Persepolis Javan | Tehran | Relegated |
| Sanat Naft | Ahvaz | Promoted |
| Tarbiat Badani Saveh | Saveh | Replaced for Saveh Shen |

== Play Off ==
First leg to be played April 09, 2009; return leg to be played April 16, 2009

| Team 1 | Agg. | Team 2 | 1st leg | 2nd leg |
|---|---|---|---|---|
| Bonyad Maskan Shiraz | 11-13 | Shahr Aftab | 6-9 | 5-4 |

Shahr Aftab Promoted to the Super League.

=== First leg ===
April 09, 2009
15:00

| Shahr Aftab | 9 - 6 | Bonyad Maskan Shiraz |

, Tehran

=== Return leg ===
April 16, 2009
15:00

| Bonyad Maskan Shiraz | 5 - 4 | Shahr Aftab |
|---|---|---|
| | Report |

, Shiraz

First leg to be played April 09, 2009; return leg to be played April 16, 2009

| Team 1 | Agg. | Team 2 | 1st leg | 2nd leg |
|---|---|---|---|---|
| Firooz Sofeh | 6-4 | Petroshimi Tabriz | 3-3 | 3-1 |

Firooz Sofeh Promoted to the Super League.

=== First leg ===
April 09, 2009
15:00

| Firooz Sofeh | 3 - 3 | Petroshimi Tabriz |

Pirouzi Arena, Isfahan

=== Return leg ===
April 16, 2009
15:00

| Petroshimi Tabriz | 1 - 3 | Firooz Sofeh |
|---|---|---|
| | Report |

Petroshimi Arena, Tabriz

== See also ==
- 2008–09 Iranian Futsal Super League
- 2008–09 Persian Gulf Cup
- 2008–09 Azadegan League
- 2008–09 Iran Football's 2nd Division
- 2008–09 Iran Football's 3rd Division
- 2008–09 Hazfi Cup
- Iranian Super Cup
