= Hossein Eslami =

Iranian cyclist (born 1969)

Personal information
- Born: 22 May 1969 (age 57)

Cycling career
- Sport: Cycling

Hossein Eslami (Persian: حسین اسلامی, born 22 May 1969) is an Iranian former cyclist. He competed in two events at the 1992 Summer Olympics.
