= 2011–12 Iran Futsal's 1st Division =

Iranian Futsal 1st Division
- Season: 2011–12
- Relegated: Faraz Qom, Arash Beton
- Matches: 116
- Goals: 627 (5.41 per match)
- Biggest home win: Foolad Mahan 8 – 0 Gaz Khozestan; Heyat Football Fars 11 – 3 Faraz Qom
- Biggest away win: Maku Javan 2 – 7 Heyat Football Qazvin
- Highest scoring: Heyat Football Fars 11–3 Faraz Qom

The 2011–12 Iranian Futsal 1st Division will be divided into two phases, the regular season, played from 24 November 2011.

The league will also be composed of 16 teams divided into two divisions of 8 teams each, whose teams will be divided geographically. Teams will play only other teams in their own division, once at home and once away for a total of 14 matches each.

== Teams ==
Locations of clubs in 2010–11 Futsal 1st Division

=== Group A ===
Team	City	Venue	Capacity	Head coach	Past Season
Arash Beton	Qazvin	Shahid Babaei	2,500	(Iran) Amir Abbas Siyah Poush	Relegated
Etemad Iranian	Mashhad	Shahid Beheshti	6,000	(Iran) Hossein Eslami	Replaced for Farsh Ara
Ferdosi Mashhad	Mashhad	Shahid Beheshti	6,000	(Iran) Vahdat Baghr Abadi	Replaced for Dabiri
Heyat Football Qazvin	Qazvin	Shahid Babaei	2,500	(Iran) Mohammad Baghban Salehi	Replaced for Poushineh Baft
Maku Javan	Maku	Valiasr Maku	2,000	(Iran) Mehdi Taghi Zadeh	Replaced for Sepah Shohada
Shahrdari Tabriz	Tabriz	Tavana Tabriz	1,000	(Iran) Hossein Ghazaei	4th/Group A
Shahrvand Babol	Babol	Mokhaberat		(Iran) Mojtaba Habibiyan	7th/Group A
Steel Azin	Tehran	Keraman Khodro		(Iran) Ali Khosravi	Replaced for Shahr Aftab

=== Group B ===
Team	City	Venue	Capacity	Head coach	Past Season
Bonyad Maskan Shiraz	Shiraz	Shahid Abolfathi	–	(Iran) Gholam Ali Honarpisheh	1st/Group B
Faraz Qom	Qom	Shahid Heidarian	2,000	(Iran) Abollfazl Sani	5th/Group B
Foolad Mahan Novin	Isfahan	Pirouzi	4,300	(Iran) Ahmad Baghbanbashi	Promoted
Gaz Khozestan	Ahvaz	Shohada Gaz	–	(Iran) Heydar Farhadi	6th/Group B
Heyat Football Fars	Shiraz	Sanayeh Elektronik	2,500	(Iran) Mohammad Nazem Alshariee	Replaced for Sadra
Homan Saz	Mahshahr	Besat	–	(Iran) Iman Isa Zadeh	Promoted
Kaveh Zarand	Zarand	Daneshgah Azad	–	(Iran) Mehdi Haji Zadeh	Replaced for Siman Kerman
Naft Omidiyeh	Omidiyeh	Velayat	–	(Iran) Mohammad Farhani	3rd/Group B

== League standings ==
=== Group A ===
Pos	Team	Pld	W	D	L	GF	GA	GD	Pts	Qualification or relegation
1	Sh. Tabriz	14	9	2	3	40	24	+16	29	Promoted playoff
2	Steel Azin	14	8	3	3	42	32	+10	27	Promoted playoff
3	Heyat Football Qazvin	14	7	4	3	42	27	+15	25	
4	Etemad Iranian	14	6	4	4	31	24	+7	22	
5	Ferdosi	14	5	5	4	37	34	+3	20	
6	Shahrvand Babol	14	4	3	7	31	38	−7	15	
7	Maku Javan	14	3	1	10	27	42	−15	10	
8	Arash Beton (R)	14	2	2	10	21	50	−29	8	Relegation to 2013 2nd Division Futsal

Updated to match(es) played on 28 February 2012. Source:
Rules for classification: 1) points; 2) goal difference; 3) number of goals scored.
(R) Relegated

=== Group B ===
Pos	Team	Pld	W	D	L	GF	GA	GD	Pts	Qualification or relegation
1	Gaz Khozestan	14	9	2	3	50	38	+12	29	Promoted playoff
2	Foolad Mahan Novin	14	9	1	4	49	26	+23	28	Promoted playoff
3	Heyat Football Fars	14	8	2	4	53	43	+10	26	
4	Naft Omidiyeh	14	7	4	3	45	29	+16	25	
5	Bonyad Maskan Shiraz	14	6	3	5	48	40	+8	21	
6	Homan Saz	14	2	4	8	29	48	−19	10	
7	Kaveh Zarand	14	2	4	8	36	40	−4	10	
8	Faraz Qom (R)	14	3	0	11	20	56	−36	9	Relegation to 2013 2nd Division Futsal

Updated to match(es) played on 28 February 2012. Source:
Rules for classification: 1) points; 2) goal difference; 3) number of goals scored.
(R) Relegated

== Results table ==
=== Group A ===
Home \ Away	ARS	ETI	FER	QAZ	MKU	SHT	SHR	STL
Arash Beton		3–3	3–4	0–1	4–3	0–2	2–1	2–8
Etemad Iranian	3–0		1–0	1–3	3–1	1–3	4–0	2–1
Ferdosi	2–2	2–2		4–3	4–0	2–3	3–3	5–3
Heyat Football Qazvin	6–2	3–3	4–1		4–3	0–1	3–3	4–4
Maku Javan	3–0 (Note: The game score was 3–0 in favor of Maku Javan until when the Arash Beton players left the field to protest against the match officials.)	3–2	2–2	2–7		0–2	5–2	2–3
Sh. Tabriz	5–1	2–0	4–4	0–2	4–1		4–7	5–0
Shahrvand Babol	6–2	1–4	1–2	1–1	1–0	3–2		2–3
Steel Azin	3–0 (Note: Arash Beton received a technical loss of 3–0 to Steel Azin.)	2–2	3–2	2–1	4–2	3–3	3–0	

Updated to match(es) played on 28 February 2012. Source:
Legend: Blue = home team win; Yellow = draw; Red = away team win.

=== Group B ===
Home \ Away	BMS	FRA	MAH	GAZ	FRS	HSJ	KZK	NAF
Bonyad Maskan Shiraz		7–0	4–5	3–2	2–2	5–3	3–3	2–4
Faraz Qom	3–1			0–3	0–3		5–3	1–2
Foolad Mahan Novin	2–4			8–0	5–1	7–1	1–0	2–5
Gaz Khozestan	3–1	8–1	2–2		6–4	3–3	3–0	4–3
Heyat Football Fars	4–3	11–3	3–0	4–6		4–1	6–3	3–3
Homan Saz	1–4		3–2	0–4	2–3		3–3	3–4
Kaveh Zarand	6–7	3–0 (Note: Faraz Qom received a technical loss of 3–0 to Kaveh Zarand and Naft Omidiyeh.)	2–6	3–6	2–4	2–2		4–2
Naft Omidiyeh	2–2	3–0	1–3	4–0 (Note: The game score was 4–0 in favor of Naft Omidiyeh between two half when the Gaz Khozestan players left the field to protest against the disturbance of the fans.)	7–1	3–3	2–2	

Updated to match(es) played on 28 February 2012. Source:
Legend: Blue = home team win; Yellow = draw; Red = away team win.

== Clubs season-progress ==
	Win
	Draw
	Lose
W/O	Withdrew

Team ╲ Round	1	2	3	4	5	6	7	8	9	10	11	12	13	14
Arash Beton	L	L	W	L	L	D	L	L	D	L	W	L	L	W/O
Bonyad Maskan Shiraz	L	W	L	L	W	L	W	D	L	W	W	W	D	D
Faraz Qom	W/O	L	W	W/O	L	L	W	W	W	L	L	L	L	W
Etemad Iranian	D	W	D	D	W	W	L	W	D	L	W	L	W	L
Ferdosi	D	D	D	D	W	D	L	L	W	W	L	L	W	W
Foolad Mahan Novin	L	W	L	W	L	L	W	W	W	W	L	W	W	D
Gaz Khozestan	W	W	W	D	W	W	L	L	W	L	W	W	W	D
Heyat Football Fars	W	L	W	W	W	W	L	D	L	W	W	W	L	D
Heyat Football Qazvin	W	L	D	W	D	W	W	W	D	W	W	D	L	L
Homan Saz	W	D	L	D	L	D	L	L	L	L	L	L	D	L
Kaveh Zarand	W	L	W	L	L	D	L	L	L	D	L	L	D	D
Maku Javan	L	D	L	L	L	L	W	L	L	W	L	W	L	L
Naft Omidiyeh	L	D	L	W	W	W	W	W	W	D	W	L	D	D
Sh. Tabriz	W	L	W	D	W	L	W	W	L	D	W	W	W	W
Shahrvand Babol	L	W	D	W	D	L	L	L	W	L	L	D	L	W
Steel Azin	W	W	L	D	L	W	W	W	D	D	L	W	W	W

== Play Off ==
First leg to be played 8 March 2012; return leg to be played 16 March 2012

Team 1	Agg.	Team 2	1st leg	2nd leg
Shahrdari Tabriz	5–4	Foolad Mahan Novin	2–3	3–1

Winner Promoted to the Super League.

=== First leg ===
8 March 2012
15:30

Foolad Mahan Novin	3–2	Shahrdari Tabriz
Peyman Hafizi 2 Iman Edris	Report	Hashem Amanzadeh; Amin Mehmandoostan

Pirouzi Arena, Isfahan
Attendance: 3,000
Referee: Alireza Abdolghani

=== Return leg ===
16 March 2012
15:30

Shahrdari Tabriz	3–1	Foolad Mahan Novin
Majid Rezaei 2 Hashem Amanzadeh		Mohsen Zarei

Shahrdari Tabriz Arena, Tabriz

First leg to be played 8 March 2012; return leg to be played 16 March 2012

Team 1	Agg.	Team 2	1st leg	2nd leg
Gaz Khozestan	9–8	Steel Azin	3–3	6–5

Winner Promoted to the Super League.

=== First leg ===
8 March 2012
17:30

Steel Azin	3–3	Gaz Khozestan
		Yasin Sajadi 2 Amir Shir Ali

Khorshid Arena, Tehran
Referee: Alireza Sohrabi

=== Return leg ===
16 March 2012
15:30

Gaz Khozestan	6–5	Steel Azin
Yasin Sajadi; Amir Shir Ali 2 Morteza Loveimi 2 Kiyanosh Alasvand

Shohada Gaz Arena, Ahvaz

== See also ==
- 2011–12 Iranian Futsal Super League
- 2011–12 Persian Gulf Cup
- 2011–12 Azadegan League
- 2011–12 Iran Football's 2nd Division
- 2011–12 Iran Football's 3rd Division
- 2011–12 Hazfi Cup
- Iranian Super Cup
