= Mohammad Nazemasharieh =

Iranian futsal coach (born 1969)

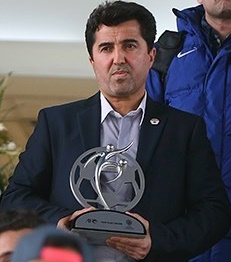

Personal information
- Full name: Seyyed Mohammad Nazemasharieh
- Date of birth: 22 September 1969 (age 57)
- Place of birth: Shiraz, Iran

Team information
- Current team: Kuwait (manager)

Senior career*
Years	Team	Apps	(Gls)
1997	Sadra		

International career^{‡}
1985–1989	Iran U23		

Managerial career
- 1997: Sadra
- 2003–2006: Iran U23
- 2010: Giti Pasand
- 2011–2013: Melli Haffari
- 2013–2015: Iran U23
- 2013–2015: Iran (assistant)
- 2015–2022: Iran
- 2022–2023: Iraq
- 2023: Kuwait
- * Club domestic league appearances and goals as of 17 March 2022 ‡ National team caps and goals as of 27 June 2021

Seyyed Mohammad Nazemasharieh (Persian: سید محمد ناظم‌الشریعه; born 22 September 1969) is an Iranian professional futsal coach and former player. He is currently the head coach of Kuwait national futsal team.

== Honours ==
=== National ===
- Third-place, FIFA Futsal World Cup, 2016
- Champions, AFC Futsal Championship, 2016; 2018
- Runners-up, Grand Prix de Futsal, 2015
- Champions, Futsal at the 2017 Asian Indoor and Martial Arts Games
