= 2010–11 Iran Futsal's 1st Division =

Iranian Futsal 1st Division
- Season: 2010–11
- Promoted: Shahrdari Saveh; Misagh Tehran
- Relegated: Daneshgah Olom Pezezhki; Jame Jam Yazd
- Matches: 115
- Goals: 651 (5.66 per match)
- Biggest home win: Jame Jam 8–0 Gaz Khozestan
- Biggest away win: Siman Kerman 2–15 Sh. Saveh
- Highest scoring: Siman Kerman 2–15 Sh. Saveh

The 2010–11 Iranian Futsal 1st Division will be divided into two phases, the regular season, played from 11 November 2010.

The league will also be composed of 16 teams divided into two divisions of 8 teams each, whose teams will be divided geographically. Teams will play only other teams in their own division, once at home and once away for a total of 14 matches each.

== Teams ==
Locations of clubs in 2010–11 Futsal 1st Division

=== Group A ===
Team	City
Dabiri Novin Tabriz	Tabriz
Daneshgah Olom Pezezhki Mazandaran	Sari
Farsh Ara Mashhad	Mashhad
Misagh Tehran	Tehran
Sepah Shohada Urmia	Urmia
Shahr Aftab	Hashtgerd
Shahrdari Tabriz	Tabriz
Shahrvand Babol	Babol

=== Group B ===
Team	City
Bonyad Maskan Shiraz	Shiraz
Faraz Qom	Qom
Gaz Khozestan	Ahvaz
Jame Jam Yazd	Yazd
Naft Omidiyeh	Omidiyeh
Sadra Shiraz	Shiraz
Shahrdari Saveh	Saveh
Siman Kerman	Kerman

== League standings ==
=== Group A ===
Pos	Team	Pld	W	D	L	GF	GA	GD	Pts	Qualification or relegation
1	Misagh Tehran	13	10	0	3	43	31	+12	30	Promoted playoff
2	Farsh Ara	14	8	3	3	45	35	+10	27	Promoted playoff
3	Sepah Shohada Urmia	14	7	3	4	44	38	+6	24	
4	Sh. Tabriz	14	7	0	7	36	37	−1	21	
5	Dabiri Novin	14	5	2	7	37	30	+7	17	
6	Shahr Aftab	13	5	2	6	31	35	−4	17	
7	Shahrvand Babol	14	5	2	7	41	46	−5	17	
8	Daneshgah Olom Pezezhki (R)	14	0	4	10	21	50	−29	4	Relegation to 2nd Division

Updated to match(es) played on 25 February 2011. Source:
Rules for classification: 1) points; 2) goal difference; 3) number of goals scored.
(R) Relegated

=== Group B ===
Pos	Team	Pld	W	D	L	GF	GA	GD	Pts	Qualification or relegation
1	Bonyad Maskan Shiraz	14	11	1	2	52	29	+23	34	Promoted playoff
2	Sh. Saveh	14	7	4	3	53	37	+16	25	Promoted playoff
3	Naft Omidiyeh	14	7	4	3	50	34	+16	25	
4	Sadra Shiraz	14	6	3	5	40	32	+8	21	
5	Faraz Qom	14	4	4	6	34	38	−4	16	
6	Gaz Khozestan	14	4	4	6	34	43	−9	16	
7	Siman Kerman	14	3	3	8	32	55	−23	12	
8	Jame Jam (R)	14	2	1	11	31	59	−28	7	Relegation to 2nd Division

Updated to match(es) played on 25 February 2011. Source:
Rules for classification: 1) points; 2) goal difference; 3) number of goals scored.
(R) Relegated

== Results table ==
=== Group A ===
Home \ Away	DAB	OLO	ARA	MIS	SEP	AFT	SHT	SHR
Dabiri Novin		5–1	3–4	3–4	1–0	5–2	3–4	6–2
Daneshgah Olom Pezezhki	1–1		1–2	1–2	1–1	5–2	1–2	2–2
Farsh Ara	2–1	6–1			4–4	3–3	8–4	4–2
Misagh Tehran	0–2	4–0	3–1		5–3	2–1	2–1	4–2
Sepah Shohada Urmia	1–1	7–5	3–1	6–5		3–0 (Note: Shahr Aftab received a technical loss of 3–0 to Sepah Shohada Urmia.)	2–0	3–1
Shahr Aftab	3–2	4–4	2–4	0–2	3–2		5–1	2–1
Sh. Tabriz	2–1	4–1	1–4	4–3	2–3	4–1		4–1
Shahrvand Babol	4–3	4–0	1–1	5–7	9–6	4–2	3–2	

Updated to match(es) played on 25 February 2011. Source:
Legend: Blue = home team win; Yellow = draw; Red = away team win.

=== Group B ===
Home \ Away	BMS	FRA	GAZ	JAM	NAF	SAD	SHS	SIM
Bonyad Maskan Shiraz		6–4	2–1	6–1	9–4	4–1	2–1	9–3
Faraz Qom	1–3		5–2	2–1	1–1	2–2	2–2	2–0
Gaz Khozestan	2–1			6–0	1–1	4–4	4–3	2–2
Jame Jam	5–2	2–5	8–0		2–7	3–7	1–6	2–2
Naft Omidiyeh		4–3	5–2	4–1		6–1	2–2	3–1
Sadra Shiraz	2–3	6–0	2–1		2–1		1–2	2–2
Sh. Saveh	2–2	5–2	3–3	5–3	5–4	2–0		10–3
Siman Kerman	0–2	2–2	6–4	2–1	2–6	1–5	2–15	

Updated to match(es) played on 25 February 2011. Source:
Legend: Blue = home team win; Yellow = draw; Red = away team win.

== Play Off ==
First leg to be played 4 March 2011; return leg to be played 10 March 2011

Team 1	Agg.	Team 2	1st leg	2nd leg
Misagh	7–5	Bonyad Maskan	3–3	4–2

Misagh Promoted to the Super League.

=== First leg ===
4 March 2011
15:00

Misagh	3–3	Bonyad Maskan
	Report	Javad Javanmardi; Shahram Amiri; 40' Hojjat Raeisi

Shahrdari Mantaghe 11 Arena, Tehran
Referee: Yahya Hossieni Talari

=== Return leg ===
10 March 2011
15:00

Bonyad Maskan	2–4	Misagh
Shahram Amiri 9'; Hojjat Raeisi 26' (pen.)	Report	6'; 8'; 26'; 37'

Shahid Abolfathi Arena, Shiraz
Referee: Alireza Sohrabi

First leg to be played 3 March 2011; return leg to be played 9 March 2011

Team 1	Agg.	Team 2	1st leg	2nd leg
Farsh Ara	6–8	Sh. Saveh	5–4	1–4

Sh. Saveh Promoted to the Super League.

=== First leg ===
3 March 2011
15:00

Sh. Saveh	4–5	Farsh Ara
Ehsan Mohammadian; Mehrdad Karimi; Nasser Babaei	Report	Davoud Abbasi; Mostafa Zarifian

Fajr-e Felestin Hall, Saveh
Referee: Mahmoud Nassirlou

=== Return leg ===
9 March 2011
15:00

Farsh Ara	1–4	Sh. Saveh
Davoud Abbasi	Report	Maziar Amirkhanlou; Ehsan Mohammadian; Nasser Babaei

Shahid Beheshti Arena, Mashhad
Referee: Vahid Arzpeima

== See also ==
- 2010–11 Iranian Futsal Super League
- 2011 Iran Futsal's 2nd Division
- 2010–11 Persian Gulf Cup
- 2010–11 Azadegan League
- 2010–11 Iran Football's 2nd Division
- 2010–11 Iran Football's 3rd Division
- 2010–11 Hazfi Cup
- Iranian Super Cup
