= List of Iranian club futsal top goal scorers =

Season by Season Top Goalscorers of club futsal competitions in Iran are listed below.

== Top division nationwide league ==
=== Province Championship ===
Season	Player	Club	Goals
1996–97			
1997–98			
1998–99			
1999–00			
2000–01			
2001–02			

=== Premiere League ===
Season	Player	Club	Goals
1998–99			
1999–00			
2000–01	(Iran) Vahid Shamsaei	Peyman	34
2001–02			
2002–03			

=== Super League ===
Season	Player	Club	Goals
2003–04	(Iran) Mahmoud Lotfi	Shahrvand	36
2004–05	(Iran) Vahid Shamsaei	Eram Kish	38
2005–06	(Iran) Vahid Shamsaei	Tam Iran Khodro	55
2007–08	(Iran) Mohammad Taheri	Shahid Mansouri	52
2008–09	(Iran) Morteza Azimaei	Rah	32
2008–09	(Iran) Vahid Shamsaei	Foolad Mahan	32
2009–10	(Iran) Vahid Shamsaei	Foolad Mahan	34
2010–11	(Iran) Masoud Daneshvar	Giti Pasand	24
2011–12	(Iran) Ahmad Esmaeilpour	Shahid Mansouri	32
2012–13	(Iran) Ali Asghar Hassanzadeh	Saba	28
2012–13	(Iran) Ahmad Esmaeilpour	Giti Pasand	28
2013–14	(Iran) Farhad Fakhimzadeh	Dabiri	26
2014–15	(Iran) Moslem Rostamiha	Mes Sungun	26
2015–16	(Iran) Ali Asghar Hassanzadeh	Tasisat Daryaei	29
2016–17	(Iran) Mahdi Javid	Giti Pasand	36
2017–18	(Iran) Mahdi Javid	Tasisat Daryaei	35
2018–19	(Iran) Mahdi Javid	Giti Pasand	36
2019–20	(Iran) Mahdi Javid	Mes Sungun	34
2020–21	(Iran) Saeid Ahmadabbasi	Giti Pasand	26
2021–22	(Iran) Saeid Ahmadabbasi	Giti Pasand	41
2022–23	(Iran) Mahdi Javid	Mes Sungun	37

== See also ==
- Futsal in Iran
- Iranian Futsal Super League
- List of Iranian Futsal champions
- List of Iranian futsal league winning managers
