= Hamid Ahmadi (futsal) =

Iranian futsal player

Personal information
- Full name: Hamid Ahmadi Dazaj
- Date of birth: 24 November 1988 (age 37)
- Place of birth: Pakdasht, Tehran province, Iran
- Height: 1.81 m (5 ft 11 in)
- Position: Defender

Team information
- Current team: Mes Sungun
- Number: 5

Senior career*
Years	Team	Apps	(Gls)
- Elmo Adab
–2012	Melli Haffari		
2012	Kuwait SC		
2012–2013	Shahid Mansouri		(2)
2013–2014	Zam Zam		(1)
2014–2016	Tasisat Daryaei		(11)
2016–2017	Dabiri		(16)
2017–2019	Mes Sungun		(22)
2019	Sipar Khujand		
2019–2021	Giti Pasand		(16)
2021–2022	Mes Sungun		(11)
2022	Hangzhou Wuyue Qiantang		
2022–	Mes Sungun		(0)

International career^{‡}
- Iran U23
2009–	Iran		
- * Club domestic league appearances and goals as of 24 October 2022 ‡ National team caps and goals as of 1 February 2022

Hamid Ahmadi Dazaj (Persian: حمید احمدی دزج; born 24 November 1988) is an Iranian professional futsal player. He is currently a member of Mes Sungun in the Iranian Futsal Super League.

== Honours ==
=== Country ===
- FIFA Futsal World Cup
  - Third place (1): 2016
- AFC Futsal Championship
  - Champion (1): 2016
  - Runners-up (1): 2014
- Asian Indoor Games
  - Champion (2): 2009 – 2017
- Grand Prix
  - Runner-Up (1): 2015

=== Club ===
- AFC Futsal Club Championship
  - Champion (2): 2015 (Tasisat Daryaei), 2018 (Mes Sungun)
- Iranian Futsal Super League
  - Champions (4): 2014–15 (Tasisat Daryaei) – 2015–16 (Tasisat Daryaei) – 2017–18 (Mes Sungun), 2018–19 (Mes Sungun)
