= Farhad Fakhimzadeh =

Iranian futsal player

Personal information
- Full name: Farhad Fakhimzadeh
- Date of birth: 14 October 1984 (age 42)
- Place of birth: Tabriz, Iran
- Height: 1.80 m (5 ft 11 in)
- Position: Left flank

Team information
- Current team: Giti Pasand

Senior career*
| Years | Team | Apps | (Gls) |
| –2004 | Pas | | |
| –2010 | Gostaresh Foolad | | |
| 2010–2011 | Foolad Mahan | | |
| 2011–2012 | Firooz Sofeh | | |
| 2012–2017 | Dabiri | | (101) |
| 2017–2022 | Mes Sungun | | (102) |
| 2018 | → Vamos Mataram (loan) | 8 | (6) |
| 2019 | → Sipar Khujand (loan) | | |
| 2022 | Giti Pasand | 5 | (2) |

International career^{‡}
| 2004–2021 | Iran | | |
- * Club domestic league appearances and goals as of 2 November 2022 ‡ National team caps and goals as of 22 January 2022

Farhad Fakhimzadeh (Persian: فرهاد فخیم‌زاده; born 14 October 1984) is an Iranian professional futsal player. He is currently a member of Giti Pasand in the Iranian Futsal Super League. He is the first captain in the Iranian Futsal Super League to win four consecutive championships. The last championship of him and his team in the 2020–21 season of Iranian Futsal League.

== Honours ==
=== Country ===
- AFC Futsal Championship
  - Champion (1): 2004
  - Runners-up (1): 2014

=== Club ===
- Iranian Futsal Super League
  - Champions (4): 2013–14 (Dabiri) - 2017–18 (Mes Sungun), 2018–19 (Mes Sungun), 2019–20 (Mes Sungun)
  - Runners-up (1): 2016–17 (Dabiri)
- Indonesia Pro Futsal League
  - Champions: 2018 (Vamos Mataram)
- AFC Futsal Club Championship
  - Champion (1): 2018 (Mes Sungun)
  - Runners-up (1): 2019 (Mes Sungun)
  - Third place (1): 2014 (Dabiri)

=== Individual ===
- Top Goalscorer:
  - Iranian Futsal Super League: 2013–14 (Dabiri) (26)

Sporting positions
| Preceded by (Iran) Ali Asghar Hassanzadeh (Iran) Ahmad Esmaeilpour | Iranian Futsal Super League top scorer 13-14 (26 Goals) | Succeeded by (Iran) Moslem Rostamiha |
