= Saeid Taghizadeh =

Iranian futsal player

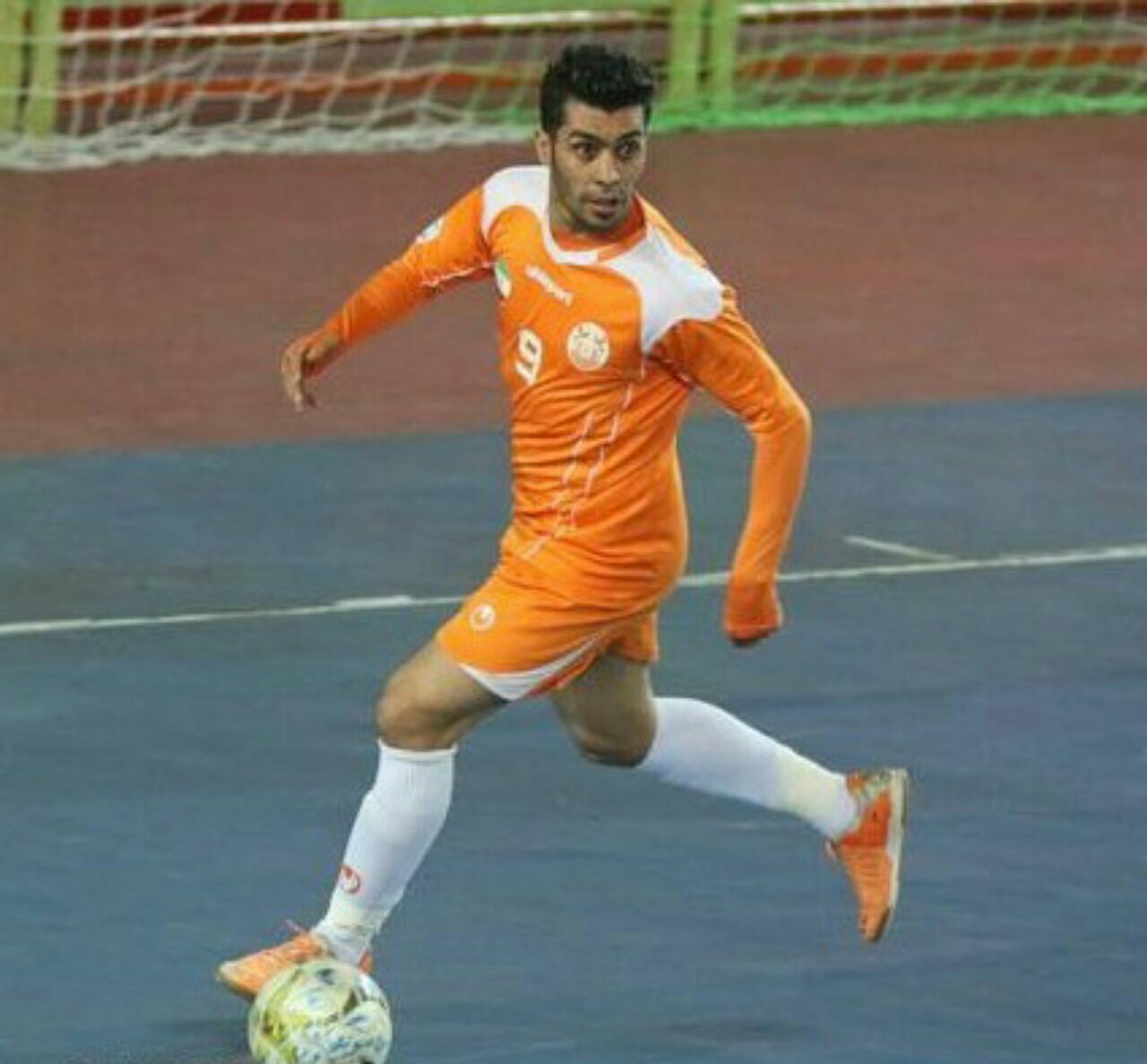
- Taghizadeh with Mes Sungun in 2018

Personal information
- Full name: Saeid Taghizadeh
- Date of birth: 15 August 1988 (age 38)
- Place of birth: Qom, Iran
- Position: Left flank

Team information
- Current team: Ghand Katrin
- Number: 13

Senior career*
Years	Team	Apps	(Gls)
–2010	Eram Kish		
2010–2011	Kish Air		(15)
2011–2012	Saba		(14)
2012–2016	Giti Pasand		(49)
2016	Al Kufa		
2016–2017	Shahrdari Saveh		(16)
2017	Ghaz Al Shamal		
2017–2021	Mes Sungun		(25)
2021	Raga		(2)
2021–2022	Mes Sungun		(8)
2022–	Ghand Katrin		(0)

International career^{‡}
- Iran U23
- * Club domestic league appearances and goals as of 11 December 2022 ‡ National team caps and goals as of 7 July 2020

Saeid Taghizadeh (Persian: سعید تقی‌زاده; born 15 August 1988) is an Iranian professional futsal player. He is currently a member of Ghand Katrin in the Iranian Futsal Super League.

== Honours ==
- AFC Futsal Club Championship
  - Champion (2): 2012 (Giti Pasand), 2018 (Mes Sungun)
  - Runners-up (2): 2013 (Giti Pasand), 2019 (Mes Sungun)
- Iranian Futsal Super League
  - Champion (4): 2012–13 (Giti Pasand), 2017–18 (Mes Sungun), 2018–19 (Mes Sungun), 2019–20 (Mes Sungun)
  - Runners-up (2): 2013–14 (Giti Pasand), 2014–15 (Giti Pasand)
