= 2013–14 Iranian Futsal Super League =

Iranian Futsal Super League
- Season: 2013–14
- Champions: Dabiri Tabriz
- Matches: 182
- Goals: 1,039 (5.71 per match)
- Top goalscorer: 25 Goals; Farhad Fakhim; Ahmad Esmaeilpour
- Biggest home win: Giti Pasand 7-0 Zam Zam
- Biggest away win: Qeyr Sanati 1-7 Melli Haffari
- Highest scoring: Tasisat Daryaei 9-5 Sh. Saveh; Rah Sari 5-9 Giti Pasand
- Longest winning run: 5 Games; Melli Haffari (7th week~11th week); Misagh (9th week~13th week); Dabiri (10th week~14th week)
- Longest unbeaten run: 18 Games; Dabiri (1st week~18th week)
- Longest winless run: 11 Games; Qeyr Sanati (1st week~11th week)
- Longest losing run: 9 Games; Qeyr Sanati (1st week~9th week)

The 2013–14 Iranian Futsal Super League was the 15th season of the Iran Pro League and the 10th under the name Futsal Super League. Giti Pasand Isfahan were the defending champions. The season featured 12 teams from the 2011–12 Iranian Futsal Super League and two new teams promoted from the 2012–13 Iran Futsal's 1st Division: Giti Pasand Novin and Tasisat Daryaei. The regular season started on 1 August 2013.

== Teams ==
Locations of clubs in 2013–14 Iranian Futsal Super League

=== Stadia, locations and personnel ===
Team	City	Venue	Capacity	Head coach	Team captain	Past Season
Amaliyat Qeyr Sanati	Mahshahr	Besat	5,000	(Iran) Babak Davani	–	Replaced for Gaz Khozestan
Dabiri	Tabriz	Oloum Pezeshki	2,000	(Iran) Amir Shamsaei	–	4th
Farsh Ara	Mashhad	Shahid Beheshti	6,000	(Iran) Majid Mortezaei	(Iran) Naser Ajam	8th
Giti Pasand	Isfahan	Pirouzi	4,300	(Iran) Reza Lak Aliabadi	(Iran) Mohammad Keshavarz	Champion
Hilal Ahmar	Tabriz	Shahid Pour Sharifi	6,000	(Iran) Mohsen Khabiri	–	11th
Mahan Tandis	Qom	Shahid Heidarian	2,000	(Iran) Mohsen Hassanzadeh	(Iran) Saeid Ghasemi	Replaced for Saba Qom
Melli Haffari Iran	Ahvaz	Naft	1,000	(Iran) Mohammad Nazemasharieh	–	6th
Misagh	Tehran	Shahrdari Mantagheh 11	300	(Iran) Mahmoud Khorakchi	–	5th
Rah	Sari	Sayed Rasoul Hosseini	5,000	(Iran) Masoud Najjarian	–	10th
Shahid Mansouri	Gharchak	7th Tir	3,000	(Iran) Reza Davarzani	–	3rd
Shahrdari Saveh	Saveh	Fajr-e Felestin	2,500	(Iran) Reza Oghabi	(Iran) Morteza Vakili	9th
Shahrdari Tabriz	Tabriz	Shahid Pour Sharifi	6.000	(Iran) Esmaeil Taghipour	–	7th
Tasisat Daryaei	Tehran	Shahid Dastgerdi	1,000	(Iran) Ali Sanei	–	Promoted
Zam Zam	Isfahan	Pirouzi	4,300	(Iran) Hossein Afzali	(Iran) Hasan Lolaki	Replaced for Giti Pasand Novin

=== Number of teams by region ===
	Region	Number of teams	Teams
1	Tehran	3	Misagh, Shahid Mansouri, Tasisat Daryaei
2	East Azerbaijan	3	Dabiri, Hilal Ahmar, Shahrdari Tabriz
3	Khuzestan	2	Amaliyat Qeyr Sanati, Melli Haffari
4	Isfahan	2	Giti Pasand, Zam Zam
5	Markazi	1	Shahrdari Saveh
6	Qom	1	Mahan Tandis
7	Razavi Khorasan	1	Farsh Ara
8	Mazandaran	1	Rah Sari

== Managerial changes ==
=== Before the start of the season ===
Team	Outgoing head coach	Manner of departure	Date of vacancy	Position in table	Incoming head coach	Date of appointment
Tasisat Daryaei	(Iran) Hossein Shams	Contract expired	1 March 2013	Pre-season	(Iran) Ali Sanei	15 April 2013
Farsh Ara	(Iran) Hamid Bigham	Contract expired	1 March 2013	Pre-season	(Iran) Majid Mortezaei	11 May 2013
Giti Pasand	(Iran) Alireza Afzal	Contract expired	1 March 2013	Pre-season	(Iran) Reza Lak Aliabadi	10 June 2013
Dabiri Tabriz	(Iran) Shahram Dabiri Oskouei	Contract expired	1 March 2013	Pre-season	(Iran) Amir Shamsaei	27 June 2013
Shahrdari Saveh	(Iran) Reza Oghabi	Contract expired	1 March 2013	Pre-season	(Iran) Mehdi Abtahi	7 July 2013
Rah Sari	(Iran) Jaber Kiyannejad	Contract expired	1 March 2013	Pre-season	(Iran) Saeid Bastami	13 August 2013
Shahid Mansouri	(Iran) Reza Lak Aliabadi	Contract expired	1 March 2013	Pre-season	(Iran) Reza Davarzani	20 August 2013
Melli Haffari	(Iran) Mehdi Abtahi	Contract expired	1 March 2013	Pre-season	(Iran) Mohammad Nazemasharieh	??
Hilal Ahmar	(Iran) Alireza Khosravi	Contract expired	1 March 2013	Pre-season	(Iran) Mohsen Khabiri	??

=== In season ===
Team	Outgoing head coach	Manner of departure	Date of vacancy	Position in table	Incoming head coach	Date of appointment	Position in table
Mahan Tandis	(Iran) Reza Kordi	Separation agreement	21 September 2013	5	(Iran) Vahid Ghiasi	21 September 2013	9
Rah Sari	(Iran) Saeid Bastami	Sacked	1 November 2013	13	(Iran) Naser Saleh	1 November 2013	13
Zam Zam Isfahan	(Iran) Mehdi Mohammadi	Sacked	9 November 2013	12	(Iran) Hossein Afzali	9 November 2013	12
Mahan Tandis	(Iran) Vahid Ghiasi	Resigned	17 November 2013	9	(Iran) Mohsen Hassanzadeh	19 November 2013	6
Rah Sari	(Iran) Naser Saleh	Resigned	21 January 2014	13	(Iran) Masoud Najjarian	21 January 2014	14
Shahrdari Saveh	(Iran) Mehdi Abtahi	Sacked	16 February 2014	12	(Iran) Reza Oghabi	16 February 2014	11

== League standings ==
Pos	Team	Pld	W	D	L	GF	GA	GD	Pts	Qualification or relegation
1	Dabiri Tabriz	26	18	6	2	112	64	+48	60	AFC Futsal Club Championship
2	Giti Pasand	26	18	5	3	112	60	+52	59	
3	Melli Haffari Iran	26	15	5	6	87	53	+34	50	
4	Shahid Mansouri	26	14	6	6	82	60	+22	48	
5	Misagh Tehran	26	13	5	8	80	65	+15	44	
6	Mahan Tandis	26	12	4	10	91	77	+14	40	
7	Farsh Ara	26	10	7	9	65	67	−2	37	
8	Sh. Tabriz	26	9	8	9	74	66	+8	35	
9	Hilal Ahmar Tabriz	26	9	5	12	62	70	−8	32	
10	Tasisat Daryaei	26	8	6	12	66	77	−11	30	
11	Sh. Saveh	26	5	8	13	53	72	−19	23	
12	Zam Zam	26	6	5	15	40	76	−36	23	
13	Amaliyat Qeyr Sanati	26	4	3	19	52	115	−63	15	Relegation to 1st Division
14	Rah Sari	26	3	3	20	64	118	−54	12	Relegation to 1st Division

Updated to match(es) played on 16 January 2022. Source:
Rules for classification: 1) points; 2) goal difference; 3) number of goals scored.

== Positions by round ==
Team ╲ Round	1	2	3	4	5	6	7	8	9	10	11	12	13	14	15	16	17	18	19	20	21	22	23	24	25	26
Dabiri Tabriz	3	1	2	1	1	1	1	1	2	1	1	1	1	1	1	1	1	1	1	1	1	1	1	1	1	1
Giti Pasand	1	3	1	2	4	2	2	2	1	2	2	2	2	2	2	2	2	3	2	2	2	2	2	2		
Melli Haffari Iran	7	10	4	4	5	8	6	4	3	3	3	4	4	3	3	3	3	2	3	3	3	3	3	3		
Shahid Mansouri	9	6	8	8	7	3	3	6	5	5	4	5	5	6	5	4	4	5	4	4	4	4	4	4		
Misagh Tehran	5	4	3	3	2	4	8	9	7	6	5	3	3	4	4	5	5	4	5	5	5	5	5	5		
Farsh Ara	6	8	10	10	8	5	4	7	8	7	6	7	6	5	6	6	6	6	6	6	8	8	6	7		
Sh. Tabriz	2	5	7	7	6	9	7	5	6	8	8	6	7	7	7	7	8	8	8	8	7	6	7	8		
Mahan Tandis	4	2	5	5	3	6	9	8	9	9	9	9	9	9	9	8	7	7	7	7	6	7	8	6		
Hilal Ahmar Tabriz	13	9	6	6	9	7	5	3	4	4	7	8	8	8	8	9	9	9	9	9	10	10	10	9		
Tasisat Daryaei	12	7	11	11	11	10	10	10	10	10	10	10	10	10	10	10	10	10	10	10	9	9	9	10		
Sh. Saveh	11	11	9	9	10	11	11	11	11	11	11	11	11	11	11	11	11	11	11	12	12	11	11	11		
Zam Zam	14	14	14	12	12	12	12	12	12	13	13	13	12	12	12	12	12	12	12	11	11	12	12	12		
Amaliyat Qeyr Sanati	8	13	13	14	14	14	14	14	14	14	14	14	14	14	14	13	13	13	13	13	14	14	13	13		
Rah Sari	10	12	12	13	13	13	13	13	13	12	12	12	13	13	13	14	14	14	14	14	13	13	14	14		

Leader / AFC Futsal Club Championship
Relegation to the 1st Division

== Results table ==
Home \ Away	DAB	ARA	SGP	HLA	TAN	HFR	MIS	PET	RAS	MAN	SHS	SHT	TST	ZAM
Dabiri Tabriz		6–3	6–4	5–1	5–3	5–3	4–3	7–2	6–2	7–3	5–2	5–2	3–1	2–2
Farsh Ara	4–4		0–4	3–1	2–1	1–3	1–3	2–4	1–0	2–2	4–2	1–1	4–0	4–0
Giti Pasand	3–3	7–1		8–7	4–2	1–2	3–4	7–1	9–2	4–1	3–1	5–4	3–2	7–0
Hilal Ahmar Tabriz	1–4	2–3	1–1		2–2	4–1	4–2	4–5	1–2	2–0	2–3	5–4	0–0	2–1
Mahan Tandis	5–3	2–3	3–5	4–3		4–6	3–1	4–1	5–3	4–2	4–1	1–4	6–4	8–3
Melli Haffari Iran	3–4	2–0	3–3	4–1	4–4		2–2	7–3	5–3	2–3	2–1	2–2	7–0	3–0
Misagh Tehran	0–3 (Note: The game score was 3-3 until the 14 minute of second half.)	4–1	2–3	2–2	2–1	2–6		9–4	3–1	4–3	5–3	2–4	3–1	6–2
Amaliyat Qeyr Sanati	2–4	2–6	1–4	0–4	4–6	1–7	1–6		4–4	1–1	3–2	0–5	2–3	0–1
Rah Sari	5–4	3–7	5–9	3–5	3–10	2–2	2–3	4–5		2–5	3–5	6–4	3–4	0–3 (Note: The game score was 1-3 in favor of Zam Zam until the 12 minute of second half.)
Shahid Mansouri	2–2	4–2	4–4	7–2	2–0	2–1	3–3	2–0	5–1		4–1	4–2	3–1	5–2
Sh. Saveh	2–2	2–2	1–2	3–1	1–1	1–5	4–4	3–2	5–1	2–2		0–2	1–2	0–0
Sh. Tabriz	3–3	3–3	2–3	2–2	6–3	1–1	3–1	3–3	3–3	2–5	1–1		6–2	1–0
Tasisat Daryaei	2–5	1–1	2–2	1–2	1–1	2–4	1–3	5–0	2–1	4–6	9–5	4–3		7–0
Zam Zam	1–4	4–4	0–4	0–1	2–4	0–1	2–2	5–2	3–0	3–2	1–1	2–1	4–4	

Updated to match(es) played on 16 January 2022. Source: Futsal Planet
Legend: Blue = home team win; Yellow = draw; Red = away team win.

== Clubs season-progress ==
Team ╲ Round	1	2	3	4	5	6	7	8	9	10	11	12	13	14	15	16	17	18	19	20	21	22	23	24	25	26
Dabiri Tabriz	W	W	D	W	D	W	W	W	D	W	W	W	W	W	D	W	W	W	L	W	L	W	D	W	W	D
Farsh Ara	W	L	D	D	W	W	W	L	L	W	W	L	W	W	D	L	D	D	L	D	L	L	W	D	L	W
Giti Pasand	W	D	W	D	D	W	W	W	W	L	W	W	W	W	L	D	W	L	W	W	W	W	W	W	D	W
Hilal Ahmar Tabriz	L	W	W	D	L	W	W	W	L	W	L	D	L	L	D	L	L	D	D	L	L	L	W	W	W	L
Mahan Tandis	W	W	L	D	W	L	L	W	L	L	L	W	L	D	W	D	W	D	W	L	W	L	L	W	W	W
Melli Haffari Iran	W	D	W	D	D	L	W	W	W	W	W	L	D	W	W	D	W	W	L	W	W	W	W	L	L	D
Misagh Tehran	W	D	W	D	W	L	L	L	W	W	W	W	W	D	W	D	L	W	D	L	L	W	L	L	W	W
Amaliyat Qeyr Sanati	L	L	L	L	L	L	L	L	L	D	L	W	L	L	L	W	L	D	W	L	L	L	W	D	L	L
Rah Sari	L	L	L	L	D	L	L	L	W	D	L	L	L	L	L	L	L	L	L	W	W	D	L	L	L	L
Shahid Mansouri	L	W	D	D	W	W	W	L	D	W	W	L	W	D	W	W	W	L	W	W	W	L	W	D	D	L
Sh. Saveh	L	D	W	D	L	D	L	L	W	L	L	L	L	D	L	W	L	D	D	L	L	W	D	D	W	L
Sh. Tabriz	W	L	D	D	W	L	W	W	L	L	W	W	D	L	D	L	D	D	L	W	W	D	L	D	L	D
Tasisat Daryaei	L	W	L	D	L	W	L	W	D	L	L	D	L	W	W	D	L	L	W	L	W	W	L	D	L	D
Zam Zam	L	L	L	W	L	D	L	L	D	L	L	L	W	L	L	D	W	W	D	D	L	L	L	L	W	W

W = Win; D = Draw; L = Lose; W/O = Withdrew

== Statistics ==
=== Top goalscorers ===
Position	Player	Club	Goals
1	(Iran) Ahmad Esmaeilpour	Giti Pasand	25
1	(Iran) Farhad Fakhim	Dabiri Tabriz	25
3	(Iran) Mohammad Kermani	Mahan Tandis	23
3	(Iran) Mehdi Javid	Giti Pasand	23
5	(Iran) Vahid Shafiei	Shahrdari Tabriz	22
6	(Iran) Shahram Sharifzadeh	Hilal Ahmar Tabriz	21
7	(Iran) Mojtaba Hasannejad	Misagh Tehran	20
7	(Iran) Javad Asghari Moghaddam	Dabiri Tabriz	20
7	(Iran) Hamid Nasiri	Shahid Mansouri Gharchak	20
10	(Iran) Mohammad Reza Kord	Rah Sari	17
10	(Iran) Ghodrat Bahadori	Farsh Ara	17
10	(Iran) Mohammad Taheri	Giti Pasand	17
10	(Iran) Mojtaba Moridizadeh	Melli Haffari Iran	17
14	(Iran) Ali Rahnama	Shahid Mansouri Gharchak	15
14	(Iran) Vahid Shamsaei	Dabiri Tabriz	15
16	(Iran) Saeid Taghizadeh	Giti Pasand	14
17	(Iran) Afshin Kazemi	Giti Pasand	13
17	(Iran) Farid Namazi	Melli Haffari Iran	13
19	(Iran) Alireza Vafaei	Mahan Tandis	12
19	(Iran) Mohammad Kouhestani	Mahan Tandis	12
19	(Iran) Behrouz Jafari	Dabiri Tabriz	12
19	(Iran) Mohammad Shajari	Shahrdari Saveh	12
23	(Iran) Mohsen Farahmand	Misagh Tehran	11
23	(Iran) Farhad Tavakoli	Melli Haffari Iran	11
23	(Iran) Meysam Khayyam	Shahid Mansouri Gharchak	11
26	8 players		10
34	13 players		9
47	13 players		8
60	8 players		7
68	15 players		6
83	7 players		5
90	11 players		4
101	13 players		3
114	13 players		2
127	27 players		1
_	8 players		OG
_	1 technical loses (3-0)		
Total goals (Including technical loses)			1039
Total games			182
Average per game			5.71

Last updated: 29 July 2019

== Awards ==
Iranian Futsal Super League
2013–14 champions

First title

- Winner: Dabiri Tabriz
- Runners-up: Giti Pasand Isfahan
- Third-Place: Sherkat Melli Haffari Iran
- Top scorer: (Iran) Farhad Fakhimzadeh (Dabiri Tabriz) (26)
- Best Player: (Iran) Mahdi Javid (Giti Pasand Isfahan)
- Best Manager: (Iran) Vahid Shamsaei (Dabiri Tabriz)
- Best Goal Keeper: Alireza Samimi (Sherkat Melli Haffari Iran)
- Best Young Player: (Iran) Mohammad Reza Kourd (Rah Sari)
- Best Pivot: (Iran) Mahdi Javid (Giti Pasand Isfahan)
- Best Winger: (Iran) Ahmad Esmaeilpour (Giti Pasand Isfahan)
- Best Defender: (Iran) Mohammad Keshavarz (Giti Pasand Isfahan)

== See also ==
- 2013–14 Futsal 1st Division
- 2014 Iran Futsal's 2nd Division
- 2013–14 Futsal Hazfi Cup
- 2013–14 Persian Gulf Cup
- 2013–14 Azadegan League
- 2013–14 Iran Football's 2nd Division
- 2013–14 Iran Football's 3rd Division
- 2013–14 Hazfi Cup
- Iranian Super Cup
