= Alireza Samimi =

Iranian professional futsal player (born 1987)

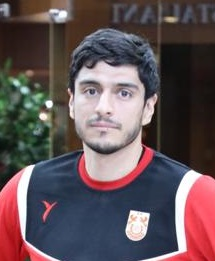

Personal information
- Full name: Alireza Samimi
- Date of birth: 29 June 1987 (age 39)
- Place of birth: Bushehr, Iran
- Height: 1.87 m (6 ft 2 in)
- Position: Goalkeeper

Team information
- Current team: Mes Sungun
- Number: 20

Senior career*
Years	Team	Apps	(Gls)
2005–2006	Daryanavardan		
2006–	Elmo Adab		
- Sadra
–2015	Melli Haffari		
AFCC 2012	→ Giti Pasand (loan)	5	(1)
AFCC 2014	→ Dabiri (loan)		(0)
2015–	Mes Sungun		(1)

International career^{‡}
2007–2008	Iran U23		
2008–	Iran		
- * Club domestic league appearances and goals as of 1 February 2022 ‡ National team caps and goals as of 1 February 2022

Alireza Samimi (Persian: علیرضا صمیمی; born 29 June 1987) is an Iranian professional futsal player. He is a Goalkeeper, and currently a member of Mes Sungun and the Iran national futsal team.

He was among the top ten goalkeepers in the world in 2018, 2017 and 2016, according to the list published by the Futsal Planet website.

== Honours ==
=== Country ===
- FIFA Futsal World Cup
  - Third place (1): 2016
- AFC Futsal Championship
  - Champion (2): 2016 - 2018
  - Runners-up (1): 2014
- Asian Indoor and Martial Arts Games
  - Champion (3): 2009 - 2013 - 2017
- Grand Prix
  - Runner-Up (1): 2015

=== Club ===
- AFC Futsal Club Championship
  - Champion (2): 2012 (Giti Pasand), 2018 (Mes Sungun)
  - Runners-up (1): 2019 (Mes Sungun)
  - Third place (1): 2014 (Dabiri)
- Iranian Futsal Super League
  - Champion (3): 2017–18 (Mes Sungun), 2018–19 (Mes Sungun), 2019–20 (Mes Sungun)
  - Runners-up (1): 2015–16 (Mes Sungun)

=== Individual ===
- Best goalkeeper:
  - Iranian Futsal Super League (2): 2013–14 (Melli Haffari) - 2017–18 (Mes Sungun)
- UMBRO Futsal Awards
  - 10 Best Goalkeepers of the World (3): 2018 (7th), 2017 (7th), 2016 (7th)
