= Paya Sazeh FSC =

Iranian futsal club

Paya Sazeh
- Full name: Paya Sazeh Azerbaijan Rad Futsal Club
- Founded: June 2013
- Ground: Shahid Poursharifi Arena
- Capacity: 6.000
- Owner: Ahad Zareei Lahijan
- Chairman: Yousef Javidan
- League: Iranian Futsal Local League
- 2014-15: 14th
- Website: http://psa-club.com

Paya Sazeh Azarbaijan Rad Futsal Club (Persian: باشگاه فوتسال پایا سازه آذربایجان راد) is an Iranian Futsal club based in Tabriz.

== Season-by-season ==
The table below chronicles the achievements of the Club in various competitions.

Season	League	Position	Notes
2013–14	Local League	3rd	Promoted
2014–15	Super League	14th	bought Hilal Ahmar
2015–16	1st Division	Withdrew	Relegation

== First-team squad ==
Source: Note: Flags indicate national team as defined under FIFA eligibility rules; some limited exceptions apply. Players may hold more than one non-FIFA nationality.

No.	Pos.	Nation	Player
—		(Iran) IRN	Amir Raeisi
—		(Iran) IRN	Majid Abdolrahim Nasab
—		(Iran) IRN	Nima Nabi Zadvardin
—		(Iran) IRN	Hadi Bafandeh
—		(Iran) IRN	Afshin Sepah
—		(Iran) IRN	Majid Iraji
—		(Iran) IRN	Ahmad Safari

No.	Pos.	Nation	Player
—		(Iran) IRN	Behnam Ataei
—		(Iran) IRN	Ebrahim Ghobadi
—		(Iran) IRN	Hashem Haghverdian
—		(Iran) IRN	Nasser Esmaeili
—		(Iran) IRN	Ramin Jafari
—		(Iran) IRN	Shahin Borhani
—		(Iran) IRN	Hamid Vahedi
