= Mes Sungun FSC =

Iranian futsal club

Futsal Mes Sungun
- Full name: Mes Sungun Sports Club
- Nickname: معدنچی‌های آذربایجان شرقی (Azerbaijani Miners)
- Founded: 1 May 2010; 16 years ago
- Ground: Shahid Poursharifi Arena
- Capacity: 6,000
- Owner: National Iranian Copper Industries Company
- Chairman: Esmaeil Taghipour
- League: Azadegan League
- 2024–25: Azadegan League, 14th
- Website: http://www.msvclub.ir
Home colours	Away colours

Mes Sungun Azerbaijan Sports Club (Persian: باشگاه ورزشی مس سونگون آذربایجان, Bāshgāh-e Varzeshi-e Mes-e Sungun-e Azerbaijan) is an Iranian professional sports club based in Tabriz.

== Season to season ==
The table below chronicles the achievements of the Club in various competitions.

Season	League										Rank	League's top goalscorer		Manager
Season	Division		P	W	D	L	GF	GA	Pts	Pos	Rank	Name	Goals	Manager
2014–15	Super League		26	14	3	9	73	69	45	3rd^{1}	Third Place	Moslem Rostamiha	26	Esmaeil Taghipour / Nasser Ranjbar / Hossein Shams
2015–16	Super League		25	16	4	5	89	55	52	2nd	Runners-up	Bello	19	Alireza Afzal
2016–17	Super League		26	18	4	4	73	41	58	3rd^{1}	Third Place	Taynan	23	Alireza Afzal
2017–18	Super League		26	20	5	1	108	44	65	1st	Champions	Farhad Fakhimzadeh	28	Hamid Bigham
2018–19	Super League	Group stage	26	16	7	3	96	61	55	2nd	Champions	Farhad Fakhimzadeh	21	Hamid Bigham / Esmaeil Taghipour
2018–19	Super League	Quarter-finals	1st leg: Mes Sungun 6 – 1 Shahrvand; 2nd leg: Shahrvand 5 – 6 Mes Sungun								Champions	Farhad Fakhimzadeh	21	Hamid Bigham / Esmaeil Taghipour
2018–19	Super League	Semi-finals	1st leg: Sohan Mohammad Sima 3 – 4 Mes Sungun; 2nd leg: Mes Sungun 3 – 3 Sohan Mohammad Sima								Champions	Farhad Fakhimzadeh	21	Hamid Bigham / Esmaeil Taghipour
2018–19	Super League	Finals	1st leg: Mes Sungun 0 – 0 Giti Pasand; 2nd leg: Giti Pasand 3 – 5 Mes Sungun								Champions	Farhad Fakhimzadeh	21	Hamid Bigham / Esmaeil Taghipour
2018–19	AFC Futsal Club Championship	Group stage	3	3	0	0	21	4	9	1st	Champions	Hossein Tayyebi	8	Hamid Bigham
2018–19	AFC Futsal Club Championship	Quarter-finals	Mes Sungun 8 – 3 (Kyrgyzstan) Osh EREM								Champions	Hossein Tayyebi	8	Hamid Bigham
2018–19	AFC Futsal Club Championship	Semi-finals	Mes Sungun 3 – 2 (Iraq) Naft Al Wasat								Champions	Hossein Tayyebi	8	Hamid Bigham
2018–19	AFC Futsal Club Championship	Finals	Mes Sungun 4 – 2 (Vietnam) Thái Sơn Nam								Champions	Hossein Tayyebi	8	Hamid Bigham
2019–20	Super League	Group stage	26	19	3	4	100	50	60	1st	Champions	Mahdi Javid	34	Esmaeil Taghipour / Alireza Afzal
2019–20	Super League	Quarter-finals	1st leg: Melli Haffari 3 (6) – 3 (5) Mes Sungun; 2nd leg: Mes Sungun 8 – 4 Melli Haffari; 3rd leg: Mes Sungun 1 – 0 Melli Haffari								Champions	Mahdi Javid	34	Esmaeil Taghipour / Alireza Afzal
2019–20	Super League	Semi-finals	1st leg: Setaregan 1 – 5 Mes Sungun; 2nd leg: Mes Sungun 2 – 0 Setaregan								Champions	Mahdi Javid	34	Esmaeil Taghipour / Alireza Afzal
2019–20	Super League	Finals	1st leg: Giti Pasand 4 – 3 Mes Sungun; 2nd leg: Mes Sungun 3 (6) – 3 (5) Giti Pasand								Champions	Mahdi Javid	34	Esmaeil Taghipour / Alireza Afzal
2019–20	AFC Futsal Club Championship	Group stage	3	2	0	1	15	5	6	2nd	Runners-up	Mahdi Javid	7	Esmaeil Taghipour
2019–20	AFC Futsal Club Championship	Quarter-finals	Mes Sungun 3 – 2 (Lebanon) Bank of Beirut								Runners-up	Mahdi Javid	7	Esmaeil Taghipour
2019–20	AFC Futsal Club Championship	Semi-finals	Mes Sungun 7 – 3 (Uzbekistan) AGMK								Runners-up	Mahdi Javid	7	Esmaeil Taghipour
2019–20	AFC Futsal Club Championship	Finals	Mes Sungun 0 – 2 (Japan) Nagoya Oceans								Runners-up	Mahdi Javid	7	Esmaeil Taghipour
2019–20	Intercontinental Futsal Cup	Group stage	2	0	0	2	1	10	0	3rd	8th	Mahdi Javid	2	Esmaeil Taghipour
2019–20	Intercontinental Futsal Cup	Eighth-place match	Mes Sungun 4 – 2 (Morocco) Feth Sportif Settat								8th	Mahdi Javid	2	Esmaeil Taghipour
Super League Total			168	112	30	26	589	349	366					
AFC Futsal Club Championship Total			12	10	0	2	61	23	30					
Intercontinental Futsal Cup Total			3	1	0	2	5	12	3					
Total			183	123	30	30	655	384	399					

Last updated: 9 April 2022

Notes:
* unofficial titles
1 worst title in history of club

Key

- P = Played
- W = Games won
- D = Games drawn
- L = Games lost
- GF = Goals for
- GA = Goals against
- Pts = Points
- Pos = Final position

Champions	Runners-up	Third Place	Fourth Place	Relegation	Promoted	Did not qualify	not held

== Honours ==
=== Domestic ===
- Iranian Futsal Super League

Winners (5) – record: 2017–18, 2018–19, 2019–20, 2020–2021, 2022–2023
Runners-up (2): 2015–16, 2021–22

=== Continental ===
- AFC Futsal Club Championship

Winners (1): 2018
Runners-up (1): 2019

=== Friendly ===
- Pasargad Cup

Winners (1): 2023

Awards

- Best team of Iranian Futsal Super League:

Winners (2): 2017–2018, 2022–2023

- AFC Fair Play Award

Winners (1): 2019

=== Individual ===
Top Goalscorer

- Iranian Futsal Super League:

2014–15 Iranian Futsal Super League
(Iran) Moslem Rostamiha (26 goals)
2019–20 Iranian Futsal Super League
(Iran) Mahdi Javid (34 goals)

Best player

- Iranian Futsal Super League

2017–18 Iranian Futsal Super League
(Iran) Alireza Samimi (Best Goalkeeper)

Best Manager

  - 2017–18 Iranian Futsal Super League – (Iran) Hamid Bigham

== Players ==
=== Current squad ===
As of 2 November 2022

#	Position	Name	Nationality
2	Goalkeeper	Mahdi Rostamiha	(Iran)
4	Flank	Mahdi MohammadKhani	(Iran)
5	Defender	Hamid Ahmadi	(Iran)
6	Left flank	Behrouz Azimi	(Iran)
7	Flank	Ali Asghar Hassanzadeh	(Iran)
8	Flank	Mojtaba Parsapour	(Iran)
9		Belal Esmaeili	(Iran)
10	Pivot	Farhad Fakhim	(Iran)
11	Flank	Hamzeh Kadkhoda	(Iran)
12		Mohammad Shajari	(Iran)
13		Mohammad Hajizadeh	(Iran)
14	Pivot	Mahdi Javid	(Iran)
16	Flank	Morteza Ezzati	(Iran)
17		Hossein Sabzi	(Iran)
18		Yashar Ganjehei	(Iran)
19		Alireza Sheikhlar	(Iran)
20	Goalkeeper	Alireza Samimi	(Iran)
21	Defender	Babak Nassiri	(Iran)
88		Mohamad Najafsangi	(Iran)

=== Notable players ===
- (Iran) Alireza Vafaei
- (Iran) Abolghasem Orouji
- (Iran) Saeid Taghizadeh
- (Iran) Ali Asghar Hassanzadeh
- (Iran) Mahdi Javid
- (Iran) Hossein Tayyebi
- (Iran) Farhad Fakhimzadeh
- (Iran) Moslem Oladghobad
- (Iran) Meysam Khayyam
- (Iran) Alireza Samimi
- (Iran) Mostafa Tayyebi
- (Iran) Hamid Ahmadi
- (Iran) Mohammad Reza Sangsefidi
- (Iran) Mohammad Shajari
- (Iran) Moslem Rostamiha
- (Iran) Mohammad Taheri
- (Iran) Saeid Momeni
- (Iran) Alireza Askari Kohan
- (Iran) Morteza Ezzati
- (Iran) Babak Nassiri
- (Brazil) Jean Gaucho
- (Brazil) Bello
- (Brazil) Farinha
- (Italy) Bocão
- (Italy) Vampeta
- (Kazakhstan) Taynan da Silva
- (Thailand) Suphawut Thueanklang

== Personnel ==
=== Current technical staff ===
Position	Name
Head coach	(Iran) Esmaeil Taghipour
Assistant coaches	(Iran) Farrokh Shahrara (Iran) Majid Zareei
Goalkeeping coach	(Iran) Faramarz Vafaei
Fitness coach	(Iran) Hossein Vatanpour
Supervisor	(Iran) Ali Saleh Panahi
Doctor	(Iran) Kazem Es'haghi
Procurment	(Iran) Behzad Abdollahpour
Media director	(Iran) Saeid Abdi
Under-23's head coach	(Iran) Hossein Mobaraki

Last updated: 17 October 2022

== Club statistics and records ==
=== Statistics in super league ===
- Seasons in Iranian Futsal Super League: 8
- Best position in Iranian Futsal Super League: First (2017–18, 2018–19, 2019–20, 2020–21)
- Worst position in Iranian Futsal Super League: 3rd (2014–15, 2016–17)
- Most goals scored in a season: 126 (2019–20)
- Most goals scored in a match:
- Most goals conceded in a match:
- Top scorer: Farhad Fakhimzadeh with 98 goals

=== General statistics ===
- All-time most goals scored in a match:

=== Top goalscorers ===
As of 2 November 2022
No.	Player	Years	Goals
1	(Iran) Farhad Fakhimzadeh	2017–2022	113
2	(Iran) Alireza Askari Kohan	2017–2022	66
3	(Iran) Morteza Ezzati	2014–2019, 2022–	65
4	(Iran) Babak Nassiri	2014–2021, 2022–	52
5	(Iran) Mahdi Javid	2019–2020, 2022–	43
6	(Iran) Saeid Taghizadeh	2017–2022	39
7	(Iran) Moslem Rostamiha	2014–2016	36
8	(Brazil) Bello	2015–2018	33
8	(Iran) Hamid Ahmadi	2017–2019, 2021–	33
10	(Iran) Abolghasem Orouji	2018–2019, 2021–2022	28
10	(Iran) Salar Aghapour	2019–	28

== See also ==
- Mes Sungun Varzaghan Football Club

Achievements
Preceded by Giti Pasand	Iranian Futsal Super League; 2017–18 (First title); 2018–19 (Second title); 2019–20 (Third title)	Succeeded by Incumbent
Preceded by Chonburi Bluewave (Thailand)	AFC Futsal Club Championship; 2018 (First title)	Succeeded by Nagoya Oceans (Japan)
