= Moslem Rostamiha =

Iranian futsal player (born 1992)

Personal information
- Full name: Moslem Rostamiha
- Date of birth: 18 June 1992 (age 34)
- Place of birth: Hesar Kharvan, Iran
- Position: Left flank

Team information
- Current team: Safir Gofteman
- Number: 6

Youth career
- Shahrvand Qazvin
- Milad

Senior career*
Years	Team	Apps	(Gls)
2011	Milad		(14)
2011–2012	Gostaresh Foolad		(4)
2012–2014	Shahrdari Tabriz		(27)
2014–2016	Mes Sungun		(36)
2018	Sunich		(2)
2019–2020	Setaregan		(12)
2021–2022	Crop		(10)
2022–	Safir Gofteman		(0)

International career^{‡}
2011–2014	Iran U23	41	(25)
2015–	Iran		
- * Club domestic league appearances and goals as of 30 October 2022 ‡ National team caps and goals as of 15 February 2021

Moslem Rostamiha (Persian: مسلم رستمی‌ها; born 18 June 1992) is an Iranian professional futsal player. He is currently a member of Safir Gofteman in the Iranian Futsal Super League.

== Honours ==
=== Club ===
- Iranian Futsal Super League
  - Runners-up (1): 2015–16 (Mes Sungun)

=== Individual ===
- Best player:
  - Best Young Player of the 2014–15 Iranian Futsal Super League (Mes Sungun)
- Top Goalscorer:
  - Iranian Futsal Super League: 2014–15 (Mes Sungun) (25 goals)

Sporting positions
Preceded by (Iran) Farhad Fakhimzadeh	Iranian Futsal Super League top scorer 14-15 (26 Goals)	Succeeded by (Iran) Ali Asghar Hassanzadeh
