= Mahdi Javid =

Iranian futsal player (born 1987)

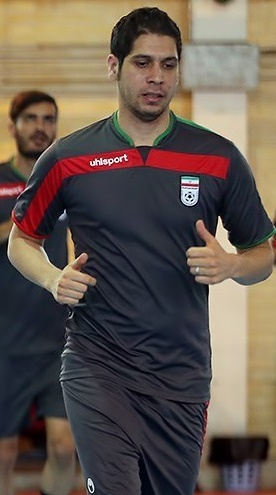

Personal information
- Full name: Mahdi Javid
- Date of birth: 3 May 1987 (age 39)
- Place of birth: Mashhad, Iran
- Height: 1.82 m (6 ft 0 in)
- Position: Pivot

Team information
- Current team: Mes Sungun
- Number: 14

Youth career
- 2000–: Dehdari Mashhad (football)
- –2006: Shahrdari Mashhad (football)
- 2006: Elmo Adab

Senior career*
Years	Team	Apps	(Gls)
2008–2010	Elmo Adab		(42)
2010–2012	Foolad Mahan		(17)
2012–2013	Shahid Mansouri		(18)
2013–2016	Giti Pasand		(64)
2015	→ Bank of Beirut (loan)	3	(1)
2016	Bank of Beirut		
2016–2017	Giti Pasand		(36)
2017–2018	Tasisat Daryaei		(35)
2018	Bank of Beirut	6	(12)
2018–2019	Giti Pasand		(37)
2019–2020	Mes Sungun		(34)
2020–2022	Crop		(43)
2022–	Mes Sungun		(15)

International career^{‡}
2009–	Iran	125	(130)
Medal record
Representing Iran
Men's Futsal as player
FIFA Futsal World Cup
Bronze medal – third place	2016 Colombia
AFC Futsal Championship
Gold medal – first place	2016 Tashkent
Gold medal – first place	2018 Chinese Taipei
Bronze medal – third place	2012 Dubai
Asian Indoor Games
Gold medal – first place	2017 Macau
Gold medal – first place	2009 Ho Chi Minh City
Gold medal – first place	2013 Incheon
Grand Prix de Futsal
Silver medal – second place	2011 Brazil
Silver medal – second place	2015 Brazil
- * Club domestic league appearances and goals as of 24 October 2022 ‡ National team caps and goals as of 27 July 2018

Mahdi Javid (Persian: مهدی جاوید; born 3 May 1987) is an Iranian professional futsal player. He is currently a member of Mes Sungun in the Iranian Futsal Super League. He was named the best player of the Asian Clubs Cup in 2018 by the AFC Futsal Club Championship. He has been selected as the best scorer of the Iranian Futsal Super League in the years 2016, 2017, 2018, 2019.

== Honours ==
=== Country ===
  - FIFA Futsal World Cup
    - Third place (1): 2016
  - AFC Futsal Championship
    - Champion (3): 2012, 2016, 2018
    - Third place (1): 2012
  - Asian Indoor and Martial Arts Games
    - Champion (4): 2007, 2009, 2013, 2017
  - Grand Prix
    - Runners-up (2): 2011, 2015
  - WAFF Futsal Championship
    - Champion (2): 2007, 2012

=== Club ===
- AFC Futsal Club Championship
  - Runners-up (2): 2013 (Giti Pasand), 2019 (Mes Sungun)
  - Third Place (1): 2018 (Bank of Beirut)
- Iranian Futsal Super League
  - Champion (2): 2016–17 (Giti Pasand), 2019–20 (Mes Sungun)
  - Runners-up (4): 2013–14 (Giti Pasand) - 2014–15 (Giti Pasand) - 2017–18 (Tasisat Daryaei) - 2018–19 (Giti Pasand)
- Lebanon Futsal League
  - Runners-up (1): 2015–16 (Bank of Beirut)

=== Individual ===
- Best player:
  - Iranian Futsal Super League Player of the Year (2): 2013–14 (Giti Pasand) - 2017–18 (Tasisat Daryaei)
  - AFC Futsal Club Championship Most Valuable Player (1): 2018
- Top Goalscorer:
  - Asian Indoor Games top scorer (2): 2009 (11 Goals) - 2017 (15 Goals)
  - Iranian Futsal Super League top scorer (4): 2016–17 (Giti Pasand) (36 Goals) - 2017–18 (Tasisat Daryaei) (35 Goals) - 2018–19 (Giti Pasand) (36 Goals) - 2019–20 (Mes Sungun) (34 Goals)
  - AFC Futsal Club Championship top scorer (1): 2018 (12) (Bank of Beirut)

Sporting positions
Preceded by (Iran) Mahdi Javid	Iranian Futsal Super League top scorer 2016–17 (36 Goals); 2017–18 (35 Goals); 2018–19 (36 Goals); 2019–20 (34 Goals)	Succeeded by Incumbent
Preceded by (Iran) Mahdi Javid	AFC Futsal Club Championship MVP; 2018	Succeeded by (Iran) Mahdi Javid
Preceded by (Iran) Mahdi Javid	AFC Futsal Club Championship Top Scorers; 2018 (12 Goals)	Succeeded by (Iran) Mahdi Javid
