= Meysam Khayyam =

Iranian footballer

Personal information
- Full name: Meysam Khayyam Rayeni
- Date of birth: 4 May 1992 (age 34)
- Place of birth: Kerman, Iran
- Height: 1.80 m (5 ft 11 in)
- Position: Right winger

Team information
- Current team: Crop
- Number: 6

Youth career
- –2011: Milad Kerman

Senior career*
| Years | Team | Apps | (Gls) |
| 2011–2012 | Foolad Mahan | | |
| 2012–2014 | Shahid Mansouri | | (16) |
| 2014–2016 | Ferdosi | | (24) |
| 2016–2017 | Mes Sungun | | (7) |
| 2017–2018 | Azarakhsh | | (14) |
| 2018–2019 | Moghavemat Alborz | | (21) |
| 2019–2021 | Mes Sungun | | (18) |
| 2021–2022 | Giti Pasand | | (7) |
| 2022– | Crop | | (3) |

International career^{‡}
| 2009 | Iran U23 | | |
| 2013– | Iran | | (6) |
- * Club domestic league appearances and goals as of 25 April 2023 ‡ National team caps and goals as of 7 July 2020

Meysam Khayyam (Persian: میثم خیام; born 4 May 1992) is an Iranian professional futsal player. He is currently a member of Crop in the Iranian Futsal Super League.

== Honours ==
=== Country ===
- Asian Indoor and Martial Arts Games
  - Champion (1): 2013

=== Club ===
- Iranian Futsal Super League
  - Champion (1): 2019–20 (Mes Sungun)
