= 2018 AFC Futsal Club Championship =

Tournament details
- Host country: Indonesia
- City: Yogyakarta
- Dates: 1–12 August 2018
- Teams: 16 (from 16 associations)
- Venue: 2 (in 1 host city)

Final positions
- Champions: (Iran) Mes Sungun (1st title)
- Runners-up: (Vietnam) Thái Sơn Nam
- Third place: (Lebanon) Bank of Beirut
- Fourth place: (Iraq) Naft Al-Wasat

Tournament statistics
- Matches played: 32
- Goals scored: 240 (7.5 per match)
- Attendance: 6,874 (215 per match)
- Top scorer: (Iran) Mahdi Javid (12 goals)
- Best player: (Iran) Mahdi Javid
- Fair play award: (Iraq) Naft Al-Wasat

The 2018 AFC Futsal Club Championship was the 9th edition of the AFC Futsal Club Championship, an annual international futsal club tournament in Asia organised by the Asian Football Confederation (AFC). It was held in Yogyakarta, Indonesia between 1–12 August 2018.

In the final, Mes Sungun defeated Thái Sơn Nam to win their first title. Chonburi Bluewave were the defending champions, but were eliminated in the quarter-final VS Bank of Beirut

== Teams ==
Of the 47 AFC member associations, a total of 16 associations teams entered the competition, each entering one team. There was no qualification, and all entrants advanced to the final tournament.

All 14 associations which participated in the 2017 AFC Futsal Club Championship returned for 2018. Moreover, South Korea entered a team for the first time ever, and Myanmar entered a team for the first time since 2012, when they participated in qualification.

Association	Team	Qualifying method
Australia	Vic Vipers	2016 F-League champions (2017 season cancelled)
China	Dalian Yuan Dynasty	2016–17 China Futsal Super League champions
Indonesia (hosts)	Vamos Mataram	2017–18 Indonesia Pro Futsal League champions
Iraq	Naft Al-Wasat	2017–18 Iraq Futsal League champions
Iran	Mes Sungun	2017–18 Iranian Futsal Super League champions
Japan	Nagoya Oceans	2017–18 F.League champions
Kyrgyzstan	Osh EREM	2017–18 Kyrgyzstan Futsal League champions
(South Korea) South Korea	Jeonju MAG	2017–18 FK-League champions
Lebanon	Bank of Beirut	2017–18 Lebanon Futsal League champions
Myanmar	Victoria University College	2017 Myanmar Futsal League third place
Qatar	Al-Sailiya	2017–18 Qatar Futsal League champions
Tajikistan	Sipar Khujand	2017–18 Tajikistan Futsal League runners-up
Thailand	Chonburi Bluewave	2017 Futsal Thai League champions
(United Arab Emirates) United Arab Emirates	Al-Dhafra	2017–18 UAE Futsal League champions
Uzbekistan	AGMK	2017–18 Uzbekistan Futsal League champions
Vietnam	Thái Sơn Nam	2017 Vietnam National Futsal League champions

== Venues ==
Yogyakarta
GOR UNY	GOR Among Rogo
Capacity: 6,000	Capacity: 5,000

== Draw ==
The draw was held on 18 May 2018, 11:00 WIB (UTC+7), at the Fairmont Hotel in Jakarta. The 16 teams were drawn into four groups of four teams. The teams were seeded according to their association's performance in the 2017 AFC Futsal Club Championship, with the team from hosts Indonesia automatically seeded and assigned to Position A1 in the draw.

Pot 1	Pot 2	Pot 3	Pot 4
1. (Indonesia) Vamos Mataram; 2. (Thailand) Chonburi Bluewave; 3. (Iran) Mes Sungun; 4. (Vietnam) Thái Sơn Nam	5. (Qatar) Al-Sailiya; 6. (United Arab Emirates) Al-Dhafra; 7. (Japan) Nagoya Oceans; 8. (Lebanon) Bank of Beirut	9. (Iraq) Naft Al-Wasat; 10. (Kyrgyzstan) Osh EREM; 11. (Uzbekistan) AGMK; 12. (China) Dalian Yuan Dynasty	13. (Tajikistan) Sipar Khujand; 14. (Australia) Vic Vipers; 15. (South Korea) Jeonju MAG (unranked); 16. (Myanmar) Victoria University College (unranked)

== Squads ==
Each team must register a squad of 14 players, minimum two of whom must be goalkeepers (Regulations Articles 30.1 and 30.2).

== Group stage ==
The top two teams of each group advance to the quarter-finals.

Tiebreakers

Teams are ranked according to points (3 points for a win, 1 point for a draw, 0 points for a loss), and if tied on points, the following tiebreaking criteria are applied, in the order given, to determine the rankings (Regulations Article 10.5):

1. Points in head-to-head matches among tied teams;
2. Goal difference in head-to-head matches among tied teams;
3. Goals scored in head-to-head matches among tied teams;
4. If more than two teams are tied, and after applying all head-to-head criteria above, a subset of teams are still tied, all head-to-head criteria above are reapplied exclusively to this subset of teams;
5. Goal difference in all group matches;
6. Goals scored in all group matches;
7. Penalty shoot-out if only two teams are tied and they met in the last round of the group;
8. Disciplinary points (yellow card = 1 point, red card as a result of two yellow cards = 3 points, direct red card = 3 points, yellow card followed by direct red card = 4 points);
9. Drawing of lots.

All times are local, WIB (UTC+7).

Schedule
Matchday	Dates	Matches
Matchday 1	1–2 August 2018	1 v 4, 2 v 3
Matchday 2	3–4 August 2018	4 v 2, 3 v 1
Matchday 3	5–6 August 2018	1 v 2, 3 v 4

=== Group A ===
Pos	Team	Pld	W	D	L	GF	GA	GD	Pts	Qualification
1	(Japan) Nagoya Oceans	3	3	0	0	14	1	+13	9	Knockout stage
2	(Indonesia) Vamos Mataram (H)	3	1	1	1	11	8	+3	4	Knockout stage
3	(China) Dalian Yuan Dynasty	3	1	1	1	7	11	−4	4	
4	(Myanmar) Victoria University College	3	0	0	3	3	15	−12	0	

Source: AFC
Rules for classification: Group stage tiebreakers
(H) Hosts
1 August 2018
14:00

Vamos Mataram (Indonesia)	8–1	(Myanmar) Victoria University College
Zikri 5'; Bawana 7'; Himawan 8', 37'; Anzar 10'; Sumawijaya 15'; Wossiry 31'; Aliefian 40'	Report	Naing Lin Tun Kyaw 29'

GOR UNY, Yogyakarta
Attendance: 500
Referee: Hussain Ali Al-Bahhar (Bahrain)
1 August 2018
18:00

Nagoya Oceans (Japan)	6–1	(China) Dalian Yuan Dynasty
Hashimoto 10', 22'; Yoshikawa 15'; Luizinho 24', 33'; Ando 40'	Report	Shen Siming 39' (pen.)

GOR UNY, Yogyakarta
Attendance: 77
Referee: Vahid Arzpeyma Mohammreh (Iran)

3 August 2018
14:00

Dalian Yuan Dynasty (China)	3–3	(Indonesia) Vamos Mataram
Diogo 22', 32'; Li Zhiheng 36'	Report	Wossiry 4'; Bawana 38'; Himawan 40'

GOR UNY, Yogyakarta
Attendance: 576
Referee: Hawkar Salar Ahmed (Iraq)
3 August 2018
18:00

Victoria University College (Myanmar)	0–4	(Japan) Nagoya Oceans
	Report	Hirata 13'; Ando 16'; Luizinho 27'; Nishitani 36'

GOR UNY, Yogyakarta
Attendance: 35
Referee: Khalil Balhawan (Lebanon)

5 August 2018
14:00

Vamos Mataram (Indonesia)	0–4	(Japan) Nagoya Oceans
	Report	Hirata 8', 26'; Luizinho 23'; Hashimoto 32'

GOR UNY, Yogyakarta
Attendance: 811
Referee: Nurdin Bukuev (Kyrgyzstan)
5 August 2018
14:00

Dalian Yuan Dynasty (China)	3–2	(Myanmar) Victoria University College
Wang Hongwei 10'; Li Zhiheng 33', 38'	Report	Aung Zin Oo 4'; Nyein Min Soe 40'

GOR Among Rogo, Yogyakarta
Attendance: 80
Referee: Osama Saeed Idrees Sedaif (Bahrain)

=== Group B ===
Pos	Team	Pld	W	D	L	GF	GA	GD	Pts	Qualification
1	(Iraq) Naft Al-Wasat	3	2	1	0	11	5	+6	7	Knockout stage
2	(Vietnam) Thái Sơn Nam	3	2	0	1	17	8	+9	6	Knockout stage
3	(United Arab Emirates) Al-Dhafra	3	1	1	1	13	7	+6	4	
4	(South Korea) Jeonju MAG	3	0	0	3	4	25	−21	0	

Source: AFC
Rules for classification: Group stage tiebreakers
1 August 2018
14:00

Thái Sơn Nam (Vietnam)	10–1	(South Korea) Jeonju MAG
Nguyễn Minh Trí 3', 26'; Tobe 13'; Phạm Đức Hòa 22'; Al-Tawail 25', 37'; Vũ Đức Tùng 28'; Trần Văn Vũ 29'; Ngô Ngọc Sơn 34'; Tôn Thất Phi 39'	Report	Cho Byung-geol 23'

GOR Among Rogo, Yogyakarta
Attendance: 50
Referee: Anatoliy Rubakov (Uzbekistan)
1 August 2018
18:00

Al-Dhafra (United Arab Emirates)	1–1	(Iraq) Naft Al-Wasat
Fadaaq 24'	Report	Jabar 33'

GOR Among Rogo, Yogyakarta
Attendance: 95
Referee: Nurdin Bukuev (Kyrgyzstan)

3 August 2018
14:00

Naft Al-Wasat (Iraq)	4–3	(Vietnam) Thái Sơn Nam
Tavakoli 25', 38'; Khalid 31'; Bahadori 32' (pen.)	Report	Tobe 2'; Tôn Thất Phi 36'; Khalid 38' (o.g.)

GOR Among Rogo, Yogyakarta
Attendance: 80
Referee: Ebrahim Mehrabi Afshar (Iran)
3 August 2018
18:00

Jeonju MAG (South Korea)	2–9	(United Arab Emirates) Al-Dhafra
Kim In-woo 2'; Shin Jong-hoon 34'	Report	Fadaaq 8', 9', 26', 33'; Y. Al-Hammadi 14'; Vassoura 20', 40'; Hezam 27'; Al-Katheeri 38'

GOR Among Rogo, Yogyakarta
Attendance: 60
Referee: Yuttakon Maiket (Thailand)

5 August 2018
18:00

Thái Sơn Nam (Vietnam)	4–3	(United Arab Emirates) Al-Dhafra
Nguyễn Minh Trí 9'; Châu Đoàn Phát 19'; Nguyễn Đắc Huy 36'; Vũ Quốc Hưng 40'	Report	Jamil 31'; Obaid 33'; Vassoura 37'

GOR Among Rogo, Yogyakarta
Attendance: 40
Referee: Ridzuan Rozali (Malaysia)
5 August 2018
18:00

Naft Al-Wasat (Iraq)	6–1	(South Korea) Jeonju MAG
Tavakoli 10', 40'; Khalid 11'; Bachay 13', 33'; Ali 37'	Report	Shin Jong-hoon 40'

GOR UNY, Yogyakarta
Attendance: 75
Referee: Vahid Arzpeyma Mohammreh (Iran)

=== Group C ===
Pos	Team	Pld	W	D	L	GF	GA	GD	Pts	Qualification
1	(Thailand) Chonburi Bluewave	3	3	0	0	21	5	+16	9	Knockout stage
2	(Kyrgyzstan) Osh EREM	3	2	0	1	9	8	+1	6	Knockout stage
3	(Qatar) Al-Sailiya	3	1	0	2	7	13	−6	3	
4	(Australia) Vic Vipers	3	0	0	3	6	17	−11	0	

Source: AFC
Rules for classification: Group stage tiebreakers
2 August 2018
14:00

Chonburi Bluewave (Thailand)	9–2	(Australia) Vic Vipers
Kritsada 1', 23', 29'; Xapa 19', 23'; Nattawut M. 24'; Sorasak 25'; Jirawat 30'; Suphawut 30'	Report	Yazid 21'; Brauner 25'

GOR Among Rogo, Yogyakarta
Attendance: 75
Referee: Hiroyuki Kobayashi (Japan)
2 August 2018
18:00

Al-Sailiya (Qatar)	1–4	(Kyrgyzstan) Osh EREM
Al-Suhaiqi 12'	Report	Kanetov 24'; Salimbaev 25'; Kazemi 26'; Alimov 26'

GOR Among Rogo, Yogyakarta
Attendance: 20
Referee: Rey Ritaga (Philippines)

4 August 2018
14:00

Osh EREM (Kyrgyzstan)	1–5	(Thailand) Chonburi Bluewave
Kultaev 28'	Report	Suphawut 3', 8', 23'; Xapa 20'; Kritsada 24'

GOR Among Rogo, Yogyakarta
Attendance: 80
Referee: Fahad Al-Hosani (United Arab Emirates)
4 August 2018
18:00

Vic Vipers (Australia)	2–4	(Qatar) Al-Sailiya
Alinejad 13'; Barrientos 38'	Report	Al-Mohannadi 8'; Golabvand 17'; Al-Shahwani 18'; Murilo 25'

GOR Among Rogo, Yogyakarta
Attendance: 78
Referee: Kim Jong-hee (South Korea)

6 August 2018
18:00

Chonburi Bluewave (Thailand)	7–2	(Qatar) Al-Sailiya
Jirawat 1'; Xapa 11'; Kritsada 16'; Nattawut M. 29'; Panat 31', 38'; Sorasak 33'	Report	Nattawut M. 21' (o.g.); Al-Braidi 39'

GOR Among Rogo, Yogyakarta
Attendance: 100
Referee: An Ran (China)
6 August 2018
18:00

Osh EREM (Kyrgyzstan)	4–2	(Australia) Vic Vipers
Kadyrov 2'; Alimov 7'; Salimbaev 23'; Taku 27'	Report	Alinejad 26'; Yazid 30'

GOR UNY, Yogyakarta
Attendance: 23
Referee: Hussain Ali Al-Bahhar (Bahrain)

=== Group D ===
Pos	Team	Pld	W	D	L	GF	GA	GD	Pts	Qualification
1	(Iran) Mes Sungun	3	3	0	0	21	4	+17	9	Knockout stage
2	(Lebanon) Bank of Beirut	3	2	0	1	16	6	+10	6	Knockout stage
3	(Tajikistan) Sipar Khujand	3	1	0	2	6	21	−15	3	
4	(Uzbekistan) AGMK	3	0	0	3	3	15	−12	0	

Source: AFC
Rules for classification: Group stage tiebreakers
2 August 2018
14:00

Mes Sungun (Iran)	9–2	(Tajikistan) Sipar Khujand
Bibudov 5' (o.g.); Hassanzadeh 8'; Taghizadeh 11'; Lotfi 15'; Fakhimzadeh 19'; Ezzati 23'; Tayyebi 34', 35', 38'	Report	Hamidov 30'; Gulyakov 40'

GOR UNY, Yogyakarta
Attendance: 80
Referee: Trương Quốc Dũng (Vietnam)
2 August 2018
18:00

Bank of Beirut (Lebanon)	4–1	(Uzbekistan) AGMK
Kheir El-Dine 8'; Javid 9', 22', 39'	Report	Tojiboev 28'

GOR UNY, Yogyakarta
Attendance: 56
Referee: Ryan Shepheard (Australia)

4 August 2018
14:00

AGMK (Uzbekistan)	1–9	(Iran) Mes Sungun
Usmonov 14'	Report	Ezzati 5'; Tayyebi 9', 9', 27', 40'; Hassanzadeh 13'; Taghizadeh 17'; Fakhimzadeh 19'; Orouji 30'

GOR UNY, Yogyakarta
Attendance: 30
Referee: An Ran (China)
4 August 2018
18:00

Sipar Khujand (Tajikistan)	2–11	(Lebanon) Bank of Beirut
Jumaev 16'; Kuziev 23'	Report	Javid 7', 12', 13'; Kheir El-Dine 10'; Kobeissy 20', 32'; Serhan 21'; Bello 24'; Tneich 36'; El-Homsi 40'; Koubeissi 40'

GOR UNY, Yogyakarta
Attendance: 18
Referee: Lee Po-fu (Chinese Taipei)

6 August 2018
14:00

Mes Sungun (Iran)	3–1	(Lebanon) Bank of Beirut
Ezzati 9', 30'; Fakhimzadeh 10'	Report	Javid 31'

GOR Among Rogo, Yogyakarta
Attendance: 40
Referee: Ryan Shepheard (Australia)
6 August 2018
14:00

AGMK (Uzbekistan)	1–2	(Tajikistan) Sipar Khujand
Sharipov 40'	Report	Vositzoda 27'; Kuziev 29'

GOR UNY, Yogyakarta
Attendance: 35
Referee: Hawkar Salar Ahmed (Iraq)

== Knockout stage ==
In the knockout stage, extra time and penalty shoot-out are used to decide the winner if necessary, except for the third place match where penalty shoot-out (no extra time) is used to decide the winner if necessary (Regulations Articles 14.1 and 15.1).

=== Bracket ===
Quarter-finals
8 August – GOR UNY
(Japan) Nagoya Oceans	2
(Vietnam) Thái Sơn Nam (a.e.t.)	3
8 August – GOR UNY
(Thailand) Chonburi Bluewave	7 (2)
(Lebanon) Bank of Beirut (p)	7 (3)
8 August – GOR Among Rogo
(Iraq) Naft Al-Wasat (a.e.t.)	7
(Indonesia) Vamos Mataram	4
8 August – GOR Among Rogo
(Iran) Mes Sungun	8
(Kyrgyzstan) Osh EREM	3

Semi-finals
10 August – GOR UNY
(Vietnam) Thái Sơn Nam	6
(Lebanon) Bank of Beirut	5
10 August – GOR UNY
(Iraq) Naft Al-Wasat	2
(Iran) Mes Sungun	3

Final
12 August – GOR UNY
(Vietnam) Thái Sơn Nam	2
(Iran) Mes Sungun	4
Third place
12 August – GOR UNY
(Lebanon) Bank of Beirut	5
(Iraq) Naft Al-Wasat	3

=== Quarter-finals ===
8 August 2018
14:00

Chonburi Bluewave (Thailand)	7–7 (a.e.t.)	(Lebanon) Bank of Beirut
Suphawut 1', 21', 23', 41'; Jirawat 14', 19'; Peerapat 17'	Report	Hammoud 5', 10'; Javid 7'; Kobeissy 8', 15'; Kheir El-Dine 18'; Bello 46'
Penalties
Suphawut (penalty missed); Jirawat (penalty scored); Xapa (penalty scored)	2–3	(penalty scored) Abou Zeid; (penalty scored) Bello; (penalty scored) Javid

GOR UNY, Yogyakarta
Attendance: 68
Referee: Vahid Arzpeyma Mohammreh (Iran)

8 August 2018
14:00

Mes Sungun (Iran)	8–3	(Kyrgyzstan) Osh EREM
Hassanzadeh 1'; Sangsefidi 3'; Taghizadeh 5', 13'; Orouji 8'; Askari Kohan 12', 21'; Alimov 37' (o.g.)	Report	Sangsefidi 2' (o.g.); Baigazy Uulu 33'; Taku 33'

GOR Among Rogo, Yogyakarta
Attendance: 50
Referee: Hiroyuki Kobayashi (Japan)

8 August 2018
18:00

Nagoya Oceans (Japan)	2–3 (a.e.t.)	(Vietnam) Thái Sơn Nam
Ando 6'; Nishitani 20'	Report	Nguyễn Minh Trí 18', 21'; Hồ Văn Ý 44'

GOR UNY, Yogyakarta
Attendance: 95
Referee: Osama Saeed Idrees Sedaif (Bahrain)

8 August 2018
18:00

Naft Al-Wasat (Iraq)	7–4 (a.e.t.)	(Indonesia) Vamos Mataram
Jabar 1', 34', 41'; Bahadori 8', 31'; Tavakoli 44', 46'	Report	Wossiry 11', 40'; Aliefian 22', 29'

GOR Among Rogo, Yogyakarta
Attendance: 702
Referee: An Ran (China)

=== Semi-finals ===
10 August 2018
15:00

Naft Al-Wasat (Iraq)	2–3	(Iran) Mes Sungun
Faisal 20'; Bahadori 37'	Report	Hassanzadeh 16', 27'; Fakhimzadeh 37'

GOR UNY, Yogyakarta
Attendance: 500
Referee: Nurdin Bukuev (Kyrgyzstan)

10 August 2018
18:00

Thái Sơn Nam (Vietnam)	6–5	(Lebanon) Bank of Beirut
Vũ Quốc Hưng 19', 29'; Vũ Đức Tùng 33'; Nguyễn Thành Tín 33', 38'; Phạm Đức Hòa 39'	Report	Hammoud 3', 21'; Abou Zeid 15', 39'; Javid 40'

GOR UNY, Yogyakarta
Attendance: 578
Referee: Ryan Shepheard (Australia)

=== Third place match ===
12 August 2018
15:00

Bank of Beirut (Lebanon)	5–3	(Iraq) Naft Al-Wasat
Javid 6', 34', 35'; Bello 11'; Kobeissy 18'	Report	Khalid 3'; Jabar 12', 22'

GOR UNY, Yogyakarta
Attendance: 567
Referee: Yuttakon Maiket (Thailand)

=== Final ===
12 August 2018
18:00

Thái Sơn Nam (Vietnam)	2–4	(Iran) Mes Sungun
Phạm Đức Hòa 5'; Trần Văn Vũ 18'	Report	Tayyebi 10'; Fakhimzadeh 12', 23'; Hassanzadeh 39' (pen.)

GOR UNY, Yogyakarta
Attendance: 1,200
Referee: Hiroyuki Kobayashi (Japan)

== Winners ==
AFC Futsal Club Championship
2018 Champions

Mes Sungun
First Title

== Awards ==
Top Goalscorer	Most Valuable Player	Fair Play award
(Iran) Mahdi Javid (12 goals) (Bank of Beirut)	(Iran) Mahdi Javid (Bank of Beirut)	(Iraq) Naft Al-Wasat

=== All-Star Team ===
All-Star Team	Reserve All-Star Team
(Iran) Alireza Samimi (Mes Sungun) (GK) (Iran) Farhad Tavakoli (Naft Al-Wasat) (Lebanon) Ahmad Kheir El-Dine (Bank of Beirut) (Brazil) Luizinho (Nagoya Oceans) (Iran) Mahdi Javid (Bank of Beirut)	(Vietnam) Hồ Văn Ý (Thái Sơn Nam) (GK) (Iran) Farhad Fakhimzadeh (Mes Sungun) (Vietnam) Tôn Thất Phi (Thái Sơn Nam) (Iran) Abolghasem Orouji (Mes Sungun) (Thailand) Suphawut Thueanklang (Chonburi Bluewave)
Coach
(Iran) Hamid Bigham (Mes Sungun)

== Top goalscorers ==
Rank	Player	Team	Goals
1	(Iran) Mahdi Javid	(Lebanon) Bank of Beirut	12
2	(Thailand) Suphawut Thueanklang	(Thailand) Chonburi Bluewave	8
2	(Iran) Hossein Tayyebi	(Iran) Mes Sungun	8
4	(Iran) Farhad Fakhimzadeh	(Iran) Mes Sungun	6
4	(Iran) Ali Asghar Hassanzadeh	(Iran) Mes Sungun	6
4	(Iraq) Hassan Ali Jabar	(Iraq) Naft Al-Wasat	6
4	(Iran) Farhad Tavakoli	(Iraq) Naft Al-Wasat	6
8	(United Arab Emirates) Mohamed Fadaaq	(United Arab Emirates) Al-Dhafra	5
8	(Lebanon) Mohamad Kobeissy	(Lebanon) Bank of Beirut	5
8	(Thailand) Kritsada Wongkaeo	(Thailand) Chonburi Bluewave	5
8	(Vietnam) Nguyễn Minh Trí	(Vietnam) Thái Sơn Nam	5

Source: stats.the-afc.com

== Tournament team rankings ==
As per statistical convention in football, matches decided in extra time are counted as wins and losses, while matches decided by penalty shoot-outs are counted as draws.

Pos	Team	Pld	W	D	L	GF	GA	GD	Pts	Final result
1st place, gold medalist(s)	(Iran) Mes Sungun	6	6	0	0	36	11	+25	18	Champions
2nd place, silver medalist(s)	(Vietnam) Thái Sơn Nam	6	4	0	2	28	19	+9	12	Runners-up
3rd place, bronze medalist(s)	(Lebanon) Bank of Beirut	6	3	1	2	33	22	+11	10	Third place
4	(Iraq) Naft Al-Wasat	6	3	1	2	23	17	+6	10	Fourth place
5	(Thailand) Chonburi Bluewave	4	3	1	0	28	12	+16	10	Eliminated in quarter-finals
6	(Japan) Nagoya Oceans	4	3	0	1	16	4	+12	9	Eliminated in quarter-finals
7	(Kyrgyzstan) EREM	4	2	0	2	12	16	−4	6	Eliminated in quarter-finals
8	(Indonesia) Vamos Mataram (H)	4	1	1	2	15	15	0	4	Eliminated in quarter-finals
9	(United Arab Emirates) Al-Dhafra	3	1	1	1	13	7	+6	4	Eliminated in group stage
10	(China) Dalian Yuan Dynasty	3	1	1	1	7	11	−4	4	Eliminated in group stage
11	(Qatar) Al Sailiya	3	1	0	2	7	13	−6	3	Eliminated in group stage
12	(Tajikistan) Sipar Khujand	3	1	0	2	6	21	−15	3	Eliminated in group stage
13	(Australia) Vic Vipers	3	0	0	3	6	17	−11	0	Eliminated in group stage
14	(Uzbekistan) AGMK	3	0	0	3	3	15	−12	0	Eliminated in group stage
15	(Myanmar) Victoria University College	3	0	0	3	3	15	−12	0	Eliminated in group stage
16	(South Korea) Jeonju MAG	3	0	0	3	4	25	−21	0	Eliminated in group stage

Source: Pending
(H) Hosts
