= Tarh va Toseh Sabz Alvand Qazvin FSC =

Iranian futsal club

Tarh va Toseh Sabz Alvand
- Full name: Tarh va Toseh Sabz Alvand Futsal Club
- Founded: 14 August 2016
- Ground: Yadegar Emam Alvand Arena
- Chairman: (Iran) Heydar Vaezi

Tarh va Toseh Sabz Alvand Futsal Club (Persian: باشگاه فوتسال طرح و توسعه سبز الوند) was an Iranian futsal club based in Alvand.

== History ==
The club was founded in August 2016 in Alvand, and they competed in the Iranian Futsal Super League. In their first season the club finished in second last place and was relegated to the 1st Division.

== Season-by-season ==
The table below chronicles the achievements of the Club in various competitions.

Season	League	Position	Notes
2016–17	Super League	14th	Relegation
