= Alireza Vafaei =

Iranian professional futsal player (born 1989)

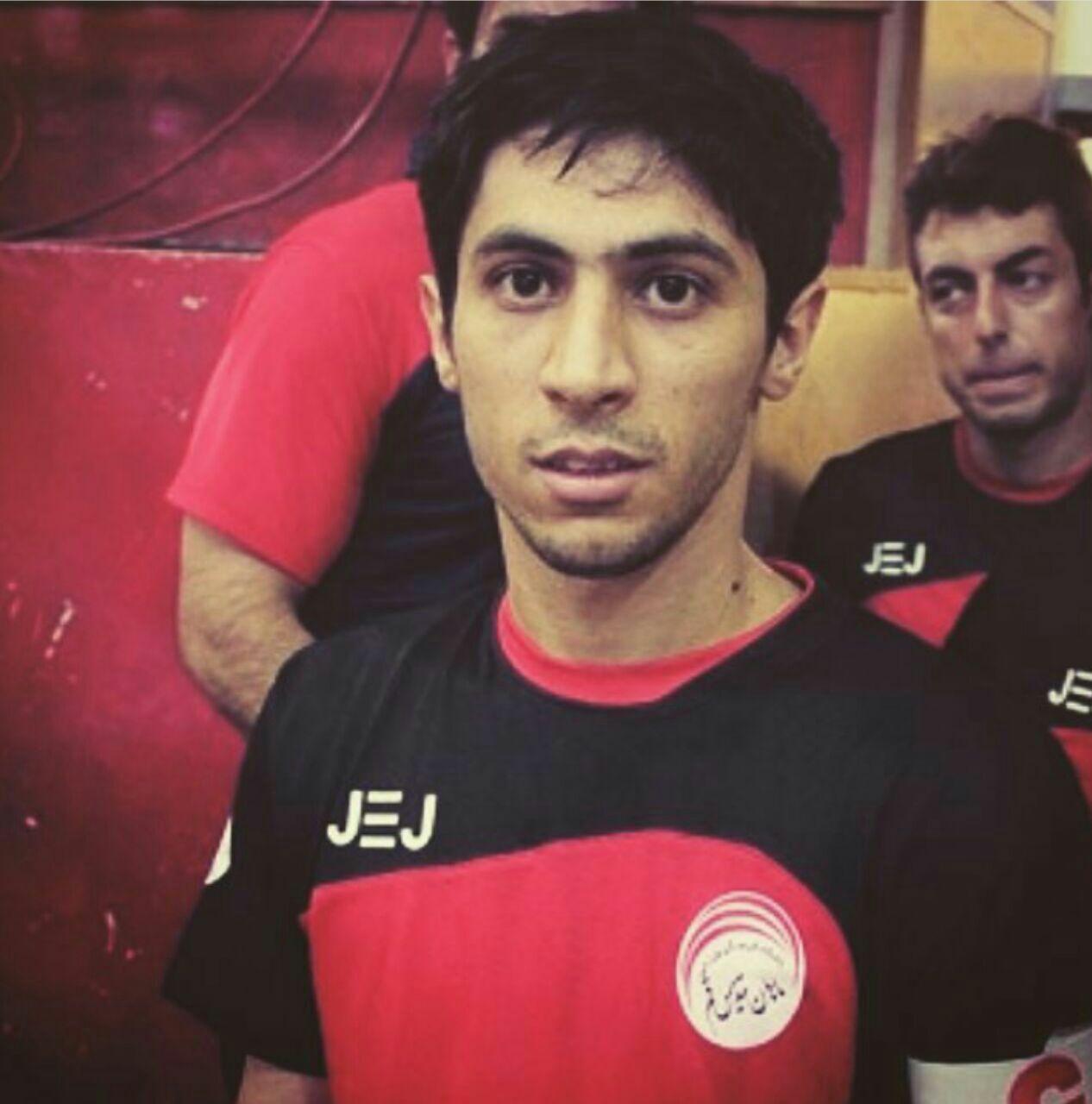
- Vafaei with Mahan Tandis

Personal information
- Full name: Alireza Vafaei
- Date of birth: 6 January 1989 (age 37)
- Place of birth: Qom, Iran
- Height: 1.73 m (5 ft 8 in)
- Position: Left winger

Team information
- Current team: Ana Sanat
- Number: 6

Youth career
- 2006–2007: Sadra Sistem
- 2007–2008: Eram Kish

Senior career*
Years	Team	Apps	(Gls)
2008–2009	Faraz		
2009–2010	Eram Kish		
2010–2011	Kish Air		
2011–2013	Saba		(45)
2013–2015	Mahan Tandis		(36)
2015–2016	Yasin Pishro		(10)
2016–2018	Tasisat Daryaei		(20)
2018–2019	Ana Sanat		(16)
2019	Mes Sungun		(1)
2019–2020	Ana Sanat	15	(13)
2020–2023	Giti Pasand		(15)
2023–	Ana Sanat	6	(0)

International career^{‡}
- Iran U20
- Iran U23
2013–	Iran		(15)
- * Club domestic league appearances and goals as of 7 September 2023 ‡ National team caps and goals as of 6 July 2020

Alireza Vafaei (Persian: علیرضا وفایی; born 6 January 1989) is an Iranian professional futsal player. He is currently a member of Ana Sanat in the Iranian Futsal Super League.

== Honours ==
=== Country ===
- AFC Futsal Championship
  - Champion (1): 2016
  - Runners-up (1): 2014
- Asian Indoor and Martial Arts Games
  - Champion (1): 2013

=== Club ===
- AFC Futsal Club Championship
  - Runners-up (1): 2019 (Mes Sungun)
- Iranian Futsal Super League
  - Runners-up (3): 2012–13 (Saba) - 2017–18 (Tasisat Daryaei) - 2020–21 (Giti Pasand)
- Iranian Futsal Hazfi Cup
  - Champion (1): 2013–14 (Mahan Tandis)

=== Individual ===
- Best player:
  - Best futsal player of the 2014–15 Iranian Futsal Super League
