= Ali Asghar Hassanzadeh =

Iranian professional futsal player (born 1987)

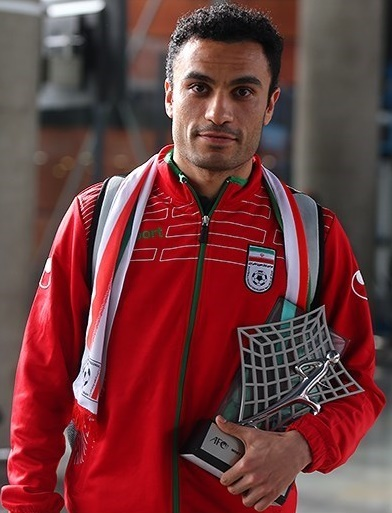

Personal information
- Full name: Ali Asghar Hassanzadeh Navlighi
- Date of birth: 2 November 1987 (age 38)
- Place of birth: Qom, Iran
- Height: 1.70 m (5 ft 7 in)
- Position: Left winger

Team information
- Current team: Giti Pasand
- Number: 7

Youth career
- Hilal Ahmar (football)
- 2003–2004: Eram Kish

Senior career*
Years	Team	Apps	(Gls)
2004–2009	Eram Kish	102	(97)
2009–2012	Foolad Mahan	84	(48)
2011	→ Al Rayyan (loan)	5	(10)
2012–2013	Saba	24	(28)
2013–2015	Norilsk Nickel	73	(58)
2015–2016	Tasisat Daryaei		(29)
2016–2018	Giti Pasand		(32)
2018	Mes Sungun	6	(6)
2018–2019	Shenzhen Nanling	37	(48)
2019–	Giti Pasand		(44)

International career^{‡}
2004–2007	Iran U23		
2005–	Iran	297	(334)
Medal record
Representing Iran
Men's Futsal as player
FIFA Futsal World Cup
Bronze medal – third place	2016 Colombia
Grand Prix de Futsal
Silver medal – second place	2009 Brazil
Silver medal – second place	2015 Brazil
AFC Futsal Championship
Gold medal – first place	2008 Bangkok
Gold medal – first place	2010 Tashkent
Gold medal – first place	2016 Tashkent
Gold medal – first place	2018 Chinese Taipei
Gold medal – first place	2024 Thailand
Silver medal – second place	2014 Ho Chi Minh City
Bronze medal – third place	2012 Dubai
Asian Indoor Games
Gold medal – first place	2007 Macau
Gold medal – first place	2009 Ho Chi Minh City
Gold medal – first place	2013 Incheon
Futsal Confederations Cup
Gold medal – first place	2009 Tripoli
- * Club domestic league appearances and goals as of 12 March 2022 ‡ National team caps and goals as of 26 August 2019

Ali Asghar Hassanzadeh Navlighi (Persian: علی‌اصغر حسن‌زاده ناولیقی; born 2 November 1987) is an Iranian professional futsal player. He is a left winger, and currently a member of Giti Pasand in the Iranian Futsal Super League and the Iran national futsal team. Hassanzadeh is regarded as one of the greatest Asian futsal players in history and has been named AFC Futsal Player of the Year four times (2014, 2016, 2017, and 2018) and was a nominee for World Futsal Player of the Year in 2015. He is also the all-time top goalscorer of the AFC Futsal Club Championship with 33 goals.

Hassanzadeh is sponsored by Spanish brand Joma.

== Career ==
=== Eram Kish ===
Born in Qom, Hassanzadeh started out playing for his local club Eram Kish Qom and signed his first professional contract with the club in 2004. In his first season with the club, Eram finished runners–up in the league.

=== Foolad Mahan ===
In the summer of 2009 Hassanzadeh left Eram and signed with champions Foolad Mahan. In his first season with the club Foolad won the league and the 2010 AFC Futsal Club Championship.

=== Al Rayyan (loan) ===
In 2011 Hassanzadeh was loaned out to Qatari side Al Rayyan for the duration of the 2011 AFC Futsal Club Championship, he was the top scorer of the tournament with ten goals and helped Al Rayyan to a fourth-place finish.

=== Saba ===
In 2012 Hassanzadeh returned Qom and signed with Saba Qom where he won the league in the 2012–13 season and was also named the top scorer of the league for the first time, with 28 goals in 24 games.

=== Norilsk Nickel ===
In 2013 Hassanzadeh accepted an offer from Russian club MFK Norilsk Nickel becoming one of three Iranian's playing for that club. Hassanzadeh scored 8 goals in 10 games for the club and left only after one season.

=== Tasisat Daryaei ===
He returned to Iran in 2015 and signed with champions Tasisat Daryaei, in his first season he was the leading scorer of the league with 29 goals and also helped the club win the double.

== International career ==
Hassanzadeh made his debut with the Iran national futsal team in 2005 and won the AFC Futsal Championship for the first time in 2008. Hassanzadeh won the tournament with Iran again in 2010 and 2016 and finished runners up in 2014, he was named the best player in the 2014 and 2016 tournaments. Hassanzadeh has appeared in three World Cups with Iran (2008, 2012, and 2016), the most notable of which was 2016 where Hassanzadeh scored in Iran's historic Round of 16 win against Brazil.

== Honours ==
=== Country ===
- FIFA Futsal World Cup
  - Third place (1): 2016
- AFC Futsal Championship
  - Champion (5): 2008, 2010, 2016, 2018, 2024
  - Runners-up (1): 2014
  - Third place (1): 2012
- Asian Indoor and Martial Arts Games
  - Champion (4): 2007, 2009, 2013, 2017
- Confederations Cup
  - Champion (1): 2009
- Grand Prix
  - Runners-up (2): 2009, 2015
- WAFF Futsal Championship
  - Champion (2): 2007, 2012

=== Club ===
- AFC Futsal Club Championship
  - Champion (3): 2010 (Foolad Mahan), 2015 (Tasisat Daryaei), 2018 (Mes Sungun)
  - Runners-up (1): 2017 (Giti Pasand)
- Iranian Futsal Super League
  - Champion (3): 2009–10 (Foolad Mahan), 2015–16 (Tasisat Daryaei), 2016–17 (Giti Pasand)
  - Runners-up (3): 2004–05 (Eram Kish), 2008–09 (Eram Kish), 2012–13 (Saba)

=== Individual ===
- Asian Indoor Games top scorer: 2007 (12 goals)
- AFC Futsal Club Championship top scorer: 2011 (10 goals)
- Iranian Futsal Super League top scorer (2): 2012–13 (Saba) (28 goals), 2015–16 (Tasisat Daryaei) (29 goals)
- AFC Futsal Championship Most Valuable Player (3): 2014, 2016, 2018
- AFC Futsal Player of the Year: 2014, 2016, 2017, 2018
- AFC Futsal Club Championship Most Valuable Player (1): 2017
- Iranian Futsal Super League Best Player (1): 2016–17

Sporting positions
Preceded by (Iran) Vahid Shamsaei	AFC Futsal Club Championship Top Scorers; 2011 (10 Goals)	Succeeded by (Iran) Ahmad Esmaeilpour
Preceded by (Iran) Ahmad Esmaeilpour	Iranian Futsal Super League top scorer 2012–13 (28 Goals) with Ahmad Esmaeilpour	Succeeded by (Iran) Ahmad Esmaeilpour
Preceded by (Iran) Moslem Rostamiha	Iranian Futsal Super League top scorer 2015–16 (29 Goals)	Succeeded by (Iran) Mahdi Javid
Preceded by (Japan) Rafael Henmi	AFC Futsal Championship MVP; 2014; 2016; 2018	Succeeded by Incumbent
Preceded by (Thailand) Suphawut Thueanklang	Asian Futsaler of the Year; 2014	Succeeded by (Iran) Vahid Shamsaei
Preceded by (Iran) Vahid Shamsaei	Asian Futsaler of the Year; 2016; 2017; 2018	Succeeded by (Japan) Tomoki Yoshikawa
Preceded by (Iran) Farhad Tavakoli	AFC Futsal Club Championship MVP; 2017	Succeeded by (Iran) Mahdi Javid
