= Sherkat Melli Haffari Iran FSC =

Iranian futsal club

Melli Haffari
- Full name: Sherkat Melli Haffari Iran Futsal Club
- Founded: 2006; 19 years ago
- Ground: Imam Reza Indoor Stadium, Shahrak Naft, Ahvaz
- Capacity: 1,000
- Owner: National Iranian Drilling Company
- Chairman: Salar Mohammadnia
- Head coach: Heydar Farhadi
- League: Iran Futsal's 1st Division
- 2021–22: 13th of 14 (relegated)

Sherkat Melli Haffari Iran Futsal Club (Persian: باشگاه فوتسال شرکت ملی حفاری ایران, Bashgah-e Futsal-e Shirkât-e Mili-ye Hefari Iran) is an Iranian professional futsal club based in Ahvaz.

== Season to season ==
The table below chronicles the achievements of the Club in various competitions.

| Season | League | Position | Hazfi Cup | Notes |
|---|---|---|---|---|
| 2006–07 | 2nd Division | ? | | Promoted Play Off |
| 2007–08 | 1st Division | ? | | Promoted Play Off |
| 2008–09 | Super League | 10th |
| 2009–10 | Super League | 3rd |
| 2010–11 | Super League | 8th |
| 2011–12 | Super League | 4th |
| 2012–13 | Super League | 6th |
| 2013–14 | Super League | 3rd | Withdrew |
| 2014–15 | Super League | 4th |
| 2015–16 | Super League | 5th |
| 2016–17 | Super League | 4th |
| 2017–18 | Super League | 4th |
| 2018–19 | Super League | 3rd |
| 2019–20 | Super League | 8th |
| 2020–21 | Super League | 9th |
| 2021–22 | Super League | 13th |

Last updated: 14 March 2022

| Champions | Runners-up | Third Place | Fourth Place | Relegation | Promoted | Did not qualify | not held |

== Players ==
=== Current squad ===
As of 11 December 2022

| # | Position | Name | Nationality |
|---|---|---|---|
| 1 | Goalkeeper | Hamdollah Ghanavati | (Iran) |
| 6 | | Houman Yaghoubinejad | (Iran) |
| 8 | | Behzad Khalili | (Iran) |
| 11 | | Mohammad Robihavi | (Iran) |
| 13 | | Morteza Taherpour | (Iran) |
| 14 | | Abolfazl Abbasi | (Iran) |
| 19 | Winger | Hossein Fahimi Moghaddam | (Iran) |
| 20 | | Mahdi Albufatileh | (Iran) |
| 21 | | Ali Shaverdi | (Iran) |
| 25 | | Rahman Eskandari | (Iran) |
| 26 | | Ahmad Reza Albumorad | (Iran) |
| 33 | Goalkeeper | Akbar Shahpari Moghaddam | (Iran) |
| 64 | | Fares Ziyagham | (Iran) |
| 72 | | Mojtaba Moridizadeh | (Iran) |
| 78 | | Mohammad Soleimani | (Iran) |
| 88 | | Ruhollah Ghanbari | (Iran) |

=== World cup players ===
(Thailand) World Cup 2012

- (Iran) Alireza Samimi

(Colombia) World Cup 2016

- (Iran) Farhad Tavakoli

=== Notable players ===
- (Iran) Farhad Tavakoli
- (Iran) Alireza Samimi
- (Iran) Meysam Ilanlou
- (Iran) Mohammad Shajari
- (Iran) Hamid Ahmadi
- (Iran) Alireza Rafieipour
- (Iran) Mehran Alighadr

== Personnel ==
=== Current technical staff ===
| Position | Name |
|---|---|
| Head coach | (Iran) Heydar Farhadi |
| Assistant coach | (Iran) Riah Mohammadi |
| Goalkeeping coach | (Iran) Ali Golabian |
| Fitness coach | (Iran) Amin Boyerahmadi |
| Technical director | (Iran) Kiyavash Alasvand |
| Supervisor | (Iran) Ahmad Poundeh Nejadan |
| Doctor | (Iran) Abdolreza Davoudi |
| Procurment | (Iran) Mohammad Saeid Helichi |

Last updated: January 7, 2022

== See also ==
- Sherkat Melli Haffari Football Club
