= Azarakhsh Bandar Abbas FSC =

Iranian futsal club

Azarakhsh
- Full name: Azarakhsh Sarkhun-e-Bandar Abbas Futsal Club
- Founded: 2000
- Dissolved: 2 February 2021
- Ground: Fajr Indoor Stadium, Bandar Abbas
- Capacity: 4,000
- Website: https://web.archive.org/web/20170825014455/http://www.azarakhshsarkhon.com/

Azarakhsh Sarkhun-e-Bandar Abbas Futsal Club (Persian: باشگاه فوتسال آذرخش سَرخون بندرعباس) was an Iranian futsal club based in Sarkhun.

== Season-by-season ==
The table below chronicles the achievements of the Club in various competitions.

Season	League	Position	Hazfi	Notes
2012–13	2nd Division	2nd / Group B
2013–14	2nd Division	1st / Group C	Withdrew	Promoted
2014–15	1st Division	2nd / Group B		Promoted Play Off
2015–16	Super League	7th
2016–17	Super League	12th
2017–18	Super League	7th
2018–19	Super League	9th
2019–20	Super League	13th		Relegation

Champions	Runners-up	Third Place	Fourth Place	Relegation	Promoted	Did not qualify	not held

== Honours ==
- Iran Futsal's 1st Division

Runners-up (1): 2014–15

- Iran Futsal's 2nd Division

Winners (1): 2014
