= 2017–18 Iranian Futsal Super League =

Iranian Futsal Super League
- Season: 2017–18
- Champions: Mes Sungun
- Relegated: Parsian; Heyat Football
- 2018 AFC Futsal Club Championship: Mes Sungun
- Matches: 182
- Goals: 1,012 (5.56 per match)
- Top goalscorer: Mahdi Javid (35 goals)
- Biggest home win: Melli Haffari 5 - 0 Azarakhsh
- Biggest away win: Shahrdari 0 - 2 Farsh Ara
- Highest scoring: Tasisat Daryaei 6 - 4 Melli Haffari; Tasisat Daryaei 6 - 4 Moghavemat Alborz
- Longest winning run: 3 Games Giti Pasand (1st week~3rd week); Tasisat Daryaei (2nd week~4th week)
- Longest unbeaten run: 4 Games Giti Pasand; Shahrvand (1st week~4th week)Heyat Football
- Longest winless run: 5 Games Heyat Football (1st week~5th week)
- Longest losing run: 4 Games Heyat Football (1st week~4th week)

The 2017–18 Iranian Futsal Super League are the 19th season of the Iran Pro League and the 14th under the name Futsal Super League. Giti Pasand are the defending champions. The season will feature 12 teams from the 2016–17 Super League and two new teams promoted from the 2016–17 1st Division: Atoliyeh Tehran and Moghavemat Qarchak.

== Teams ==
=== Stadia, locations and Personnel ===
Locations of clubs in 2017–18 Iranian Futsal Super League

| Team | City | Venue | Capacity | Head coach | Team captain | Past Season |
|---|---|---|---|---|---|---|
| Atoliyeh Tehran | Qom | Shahid Heidarian | 2,000 | (Iran) Vahid Ghiasi | (Iran) Hashem Farajzadeh | Promoted |
| Azarakhsh | Sarkhun | Fajr | 4,000 | (Iran) Abbas Rouzpeikar | – | 12th |
| Farsh Ara | Mashhad | Shahid Beheshti | 6,000 | (Iran) Mohsen Khabiri | (Iran) Ghodrat Bahadori | 9th |
| Giti Pasand | Isfahan | Pirouzi | 4,300 | (Iran) Hossein Shams | – | Champion |
| Heyat Football^{1} | Qom | Shahid Heidarian | 2,000 | (Iran) Mahdi Ghiasi | (Iran) Mohammad Kermani | 10th |
| Labaniyat Arjan | Shiraz | Shahid Abolfathi | – | (Iran) Hamid Reza Kamali | – | 8th |
| Melli Haffari | Ahvaz | Emam Reza | 1,000 | (Iran) Kiyavash Alasvand | (Iran) Farid Namazi | 4th |
| Mes Sungun | Varzaqan | Shahid Pour Sharifi | 6,000 | (Iran) Hamid Bigham | (Iran) Babak Nassiri | 3rd |
| Moghavemat | Karaj | Enghelab Eslami | 2,500 | (Iran) Masoud Kianfar | – | 11th |
| Moghavemat | Qarchak | Shohadaye 7th Tir | 3,000 | (Iran) Reza Zarkhanli | (Iran) Mojtaba Nassirnia | Promoted |
| Parsian | Shahr-e Qods | Al Ghadir | 1,000 | (Iran) Mahmoud Khorakchi | – | Replaced for Dabiri |
| Shahrdari | Saveh | Fajr-e Felestin | 2,500 | (Iran) Reza Lak Aliabadi | – | 6th |
| Shahrvand | Sari | Sayed Rasoul Hosseini | 5,000 | (Iran) Mohammad Ali Esmaeilpour | – | 7th |
| Tasisat Daryaei | Tehran | Handball Federation | – | (Iran) Vahid Shamsaei (unofficial) (Iran) Reza Naseri (official) | (Iran) Vahid Shamsaei | 5th |

- ^{1} Yasin Pishro Renamed to Heyat Football.

=== Number of teams by region ===
| | Region | Number of teams | Teams |
|---|---|---|---|
| 1 | Tehran | 3 | Moghavemat Qarchak, Parsian, Tasisat Daryaei |
| 2 | Qom | 2 | Atoliyeh Tehran, Heyat Football |
| 3 | Alborz | 1 | Moghavemat Alborz |
| 4 | Fars | 1 | Labaniyat Arjan |
| 5 | East Azerbaijan | 1 | Mes Sungun |
| 6 | Khuzestan | 1 | Melli Haffari |
| 7 | Isfahan | 1 | Giti Pasand |
| 8 | Hormozgan | 1 | Azarakhsh |
| 9 | Mazandaran | 1 | Shahrvand |
| 10 | Markazi | 1 | Shahrdari |
| 11 | Razavi Khorasan | 1 | Farsh Ara |

== League standings ==
| Pos | Team | Pld | W | D | L | GF | GA | GD | Pts | Qualification or relegation |
|---|---|---|---|---|---|---|---|---|---|---|
| 1 | Mes Sungun (C) | 26 | 20 | 5 | 1 | 108 | 44 | +64 | 65 | Qualification for the AFC Futsal Club Championship |
| 2 | Tasisat Daryaei | 26 | 19 | 2 | 5 | 106 | 68 | +38 | 59 | |
| 3 | Giti Pasand | 26 | 15 | 6 | 5 | 93 | 63 | +30 | 51 | |
| 4 | Melli Haffari | 26 | 12 | 10 | 4 | 96 | 65 | +31 | 46 | |
| 5 | Atoliyeh Tehran | 26 | 11 | 7 | 8 | 71 | 64 | +7 | 40 | |
| 6 | Farsh Ara | 26 | 11 | 5 | 10 | 60 | 64 | −4 | 38 | |
| 7 | Azarakhsh | 26 | 10 | 5 | 11 | 60 | 68 | −8 | 35 | |
| 8 | Moghavemat Qarchak | 26 | 9 | 6 | 11 | 69 | 71 | −2 | 33 | |
| 9 | Shahrvand | 26 | 7 | 9 | 10 | 61 | 63 | −2 | 30 | |
| 10 | Shahrdari | 26 | 8 | 4 | 14 | 70 | 90 | −20 | 28 | |
| 11 | Moghavemat Alborz | 26 | 7 | 7 | 12 | 56 | 82 | −26 | 28 | |
| 12 | Labaniyat Arjan | 26 | 7 | 3 | 16 | 60 | 77 | −17 | 24 | |
| 13 | Parsian (R) | 26 | 5 | 5 | 16 | 60 | 98 | −38 | 20 | Relegation to the 1st Division |
| 14 | Heyat Football (R) | 26 | 2 | 4 | 20 | 42 | 95 | −53 | 10 | Relegation to the 1st Division |

Updated to match(es) played on 13 March 2022. Source: Futsal Casa
Rules for classification: 1) Points; 2) Goal difference; 3) Goals scored.
(C) Champions; (R) Relegated

== Positions by round ==
| Team ╲ Round | 1 | 2 | 3 | 4 | 5 | 6 | 7 | 8 | 9 | 10 | 11 | 12 | 13 | 14 | 15 | 16 | 17 | 18 | 19 | 20 | 21 | 22 | 23 | 24 | 25 | 26 |
|---|---|---|---|---|---|---|---|---|---|---|---|---|---|---|---|---|---|---|---|---|---|---|---|---|---|---|
| Labaniyat Arjan | | | | | | | | | | | | | | | | | | | | | | | | | | |
| Giti Pasand | | | | | | | | | | | | | | | | | | | | | | | | | | |
| Atoliyeh Tehran | | | | | | | | | | | | | | | | | | | | | | | | | | |
| Mes Sungun | | | | | | | | | | | | | | | | | | | | | | | | | | |
| Melli Haffari | | | | | | | | | | | | | | | | | | | | | | | | | | |
| Tasisat Daryaei | | | | | | | | | | | | | | | | | | | | | | | | | | |
| Shahrdari | | | | | | | | | | | | | | | | | | | | | | | | | | |
| Shahrvand | | | | | | | | | | | | | | | | | | | | | | | | | | |
| Farsh Ara | | | | | | | | | | | | | | | | | | | | | | | | | | |
| Heyat Football | | | | | | | | | | | | | | | | | | | | | | | | | | |
| Moghavemat Alborz | | | | | | | | | | | | | | | | | | | | | | | | | | |
| Azarakhsh | | | | | | | | | | | | | | | | | | | | | | | | | | |
| Parsian | | | | | | | | | | | | | | | | | | | | | | | | | | |
| Moghavemat Qarchak | | | | | | | | | | | | | | | | | | | | | | | | | | |

| Leader / 2018 AFC Futsal Club Championship |
| Relegation to the 2018–19 Iran Futsal's 1st Division |

Updated to match(es) played on 14 January 2022. Source:

== Results table ==
| Home \ Away | ARJ | ATQ | AZA | ARA | SGP | HFQ | HFR | MES | MOA | MOQ | PAR | SHS | SAR | TST |
|---|---|---|---|---|---|---|---|---|---|---|---|---|---|---|
| Labaniyat Arjan | | 1–3 | 4–0 | 0–1 | 1–3 | 4–0 | 2–2 | 2–2 | 3–3 | 4–3 | 6–1 | 6–3 | 3–0 | 0–2 |
| Atoliyeh Tehran | 3–2 | | 2–2 | 4–2 | 3–3 | 5–0 | 3–3 | 1–1 | 3–3 | 2–1 | 2–3 | 4–2 | 4–3 | 5–6 |
| Azarakhsh | 3–1 | 1–2 | | 4–2 | 2–3 | 2–1 | 3–4 | 1–2 | 3–3 | 2–2 | 2–0 | 3–1 | 4–2 | 5–1 |
| Farsh Ara | 7–2 | 1–3 | 3–0 (Note: Azarakhsh received a technical loss of 3-0 to Farsh Ara.) | | 3–2 | 2–1 | 3–3 | 1–6 | 1–2 | 2–2 | 1–0 | 3–3 | 4–2 | 1–2 |
| Giti Pasand | 3–2 | 6–1 | 2–2 | 3–2 | | 3–1 | 3–3 | 4–5 | 5–3 | 6–3 | 9–1 | 5–3 | 2–1 | 2–4 |
| Heyat Football | 1–3 | 3–5 | 1–2 | 1–2 | 0–3 (Note: Heyat Football received a technical loss of 3-0 to Giti Pasand.) | | 2–3 | 3–7 | 1–1 | 3–3 | 2–9 | 2–2 | 3–0 | 3–4 |
| Melli Haffari | 5–3 | 3–2 | 5–0 | 5–2 | 7–3 | 10–3 | | 1–2 | 6–2 | 3–2 | 1–1 | 3–3 | 1–1 | 7–4 |
| Mes Sungun | 6–1 | 6–2 | 7–2 | 3–0 | 3–3 | 9–1 | 2–2 | | 4–1 | 7–1 | 7–1 | 4–2 | 4–0 | 2–1 |
| Moghavemat Alborz | 3–2 | 0–3 | 3–2 | 2–2 | 1–6 | 3–2 | 3–2 | 2–4 | | 1–2 | 7–1 | 1–3 | 2–2 | 1–8 |
| Moghavemat Qarchak | 4–2 | 3–1 | 1–0 | 2–3 | 2–2 | 2–2 | 2–1 | 5–2 | 0–2 | | 5–2 | 5–2 | 4–1 | 3–4 |
| Parsian | 3–1 | 2–2 | 4–5 | 3–3 | 0–5 | 3–2 | 1–5 | 0–2 | 1–1 | 7–5 | | 1–4 | 3–3 | 3–4 |
| Shahrdari | 6–3 | 4–3 | 3–5 | 0–2 | 2–3 | 4–1 | 3–3 | 3–4 | 4–1 | 3–2 | 4–3 | | 1–2 | 2–4 |
| Shahrvand | 7–2 | 2–2 | 4–1 | 2–4 | 3–3 | 2–0 | 3–3 | 2–2 | 5–1 | 3–3 | 3–1 | 5–2 | | 1–1 |
| Tasisat Daryaei | 3–0 | 1–0 | 4–4 | 7–3 | 4–0 | 2–3 | 6–4 | 2–5 | 6–4 | 4–1 | 7–5 | 12–1 | 3–2 | |

Updated to match(es) played on 10 September 2019. Source:
Legend: Blue = home team win; Yellow = draw; Red = away team win.

== Clubs season-progress ==
| Team ╲ Round | 1 | 2 | 3 | 4 | 5 | 6 | 7 | 8 | 9 | 10 | 11 | 12 | 13 | 14 | 15 | 16 | 17 | 18 | 19 | 20 | 21 | 22 | 23 | 24 | 25 | 26 |
|---|---|---|---|---|---|---|---|---|---|---|---|---|---|---|---|---|---|---|---|---|---|---|---|---|---|---|
| Labaniyat Arjan | D | L | L | L | W | | | | | | | | | | | | | | | | | | | | | |
| Atoliyeh Tehran | W | W | D | W | L | | | | | | | | | | | | | | | | | | | | | |
| Azarakhsh | W/O | L | L | W | L | | | | | | | | | | | | | | | | | | | | | |
| Farsh Ara | W | W | D | L | W | | | | | | | | | | | | | | | | | | | | | |
| Giti Pasand | W | W | W | D | | | | | | | | | | | | | | | | | | | | | | |
| Heyat Football | W/O | L | L | L | D | | | | | | | | | | | | | | | | | | | | | |
| Melli Haffari | D | L | W | D | W | | | | | | | | | | | | | | | | | | | | | |
| Mes Sungun | W | W | W | L | W | | | | | | | | | | | | | | | | | | | | | |
| Moghavemat Alborz | D | L | D | L | W | | | | | | | | | | | | | | | | | | | | | |
| Moghavemat Qarchak | L | W | D | W | L | | | | | | | | | | | | | | | | | | | | | |
| Parsian | L | L | D | W | L | | | | | | | | | | | | | | | | | | | | | |
| Shahrdari | W | L | L | D | D | | | | | | | | | | | | | | | | | | | | | |
| Shahrvand | D | W | D | D | L | | | | | | | | | | | | | | | | | | | | | |
| Tasisat Daryaei | L | W | W | W | | | | | | | | | | | | | | | | | | | | | | |

Updated to match(es) played on 14 January 2022. Source:
W = Win; D = Draw; L = Lose; W/O = Withdrew

== Awards ==
Iranian Futsal Super League
2017–18 champions
Mes Sungun
First title

- Winner: Mes Sungun
- Runners-up: Tasisat Daryaei
- Third-Place: Giti Pasand
- Top scorer: (Iran) Mahdi Javid (Tasisat Daryaei) (35 goals)
- Best player: (Iran) Mahdi Javid
- Best manager: (Iran) Hamid Bigham (Mes Sungun)
- Best goalkeeper: (Iran) Alireza Samimi (Mes Sungun)
- Best team: Mes Sungun
- Fairplay man: (Iran) Sepehr Mohammadi (Giti Pasand)
- Best referee: Mahmoud Nasirlou

== See also ==
- 2017–18 Iran Futsal's 1st Division
- 2018 Futsal's 2nd Division
- 2017–18 Persian Gulf Cup
- 2017–18 Azadegan League
- 2017–18 Iran Football's 2nd Division
- 2017–18 Iran Football's 3rd Division
- 2017–18 Hazfi Cup
- 2017 Iranian Super Cup
