= 2014–15 Iranian Futsal Super League =

Iranian Futsal Super League
- Season: 2014–15
- Champions: Tasisat
- Relegated: Paya Sazeh; Sh.Saveh
- 2015 AFC Futsal Club Championship: Tasisat
- Matches: 154
- Goals: 810 (5.26 per match)
- Top goalscorer: 26 Goals; Moslem Rostamiha
- Biggest home win: Tasisat 5 – 0 Moghavemat; Mes Sungun 6 – 1 Sh. Saveh; Melli Haffari 6 – 1 Misagh
- Biggest away win: Shahid Mansouri 1 – 6 Giti Pasand
- Highest scoring: Shahid Mansouri 10–6 Sh. Saveh
- Longest winning run: 7 Games; Mahan Tandis (1st week~7th week)
- Longest unbeaten run: 18 Games; Melli Haffari (1st week~18th week)
- Longest winless run: 8 Games; Paya Sazeh (10th week~17th week)
- Longest losing run: 6 Games; Sh. Saveh (2nd week~7th week) / (9th week~14th week)

The 2014–15 Iranian Futsal Super League are the 16th season of the Iran Pro League and the 11th under the name Futsal Super League. Dabiri Tabriz are the defending champions. The season will feature 12 teams from the 2013–14 Iranian Futsal Super League and two new teams promoted from the 2013–14 Iran Futsal's 1st Division: Moghavemat Alborz and Ferdosi Mashhad.

== Teams ==
Locations of clubs in 2014–15 Iranian Futsal Super League

=== Stadia, locations and Personnel ===
Team	City	Venue	Capacity	Head coach	Team captain	Past Season
Dabiri	Tabriz	Shahid Pour Sharifi	6,000	(Iran) Javad Asghari Moghaddam	–	Champion
Farsh Ara	Mashhad	Shahid Beheshti	6,000	(Iran) Majid Mortezaei	(Iran) Ghodrat Bahadori	7th
Ferdosi	Mashhad	Karegaran	–	(Iran) Mostafa Nemati	–	Promoted
Giti Pasand	Isfahan	Pirouzi	4,300	(Iran) Mohammad Keshavarz	–	2nd
Mahan Tandis	Qom	Shahid Heidarian	2,000	(Iran) Alireza Radi	(Iran) Saeid Ghasemi	6th
Melli Haffari Iran	Ahvaz	Naft	1,000	(Iran) Mohammad Nazemasharieh	(Iran) Ramin Kariminezhad	3rd
Mes Sungun	Varzaqan	Shahid Pour Sharifi	6,000	(Iran) Hossein Shams	(Iran) Ramin Rostamiyan	Replaced for Shahrdari Tabriz
Misagh	Tehran	Shahrdari Mantagheh 11	300	(Iran) Reza Lak Aliabadi	–	5th
Moghavemat Alborz	Karaj	Enghelab	2,500	(Iran) Reza Fallahzadeh	–	Promoted
Paya Sazeh	Tabriz	Shahid Pour Sharifi	6,000	(Iran) Naser Rahnama	–	Replaced for Hilal Ahmar Tabriz
Shahid Mansouri	Gharchak	7th Tir	3,000	(Iran) Reza Davarzani	–	4th
Shahrdari	Saveh	Fajr-e Felestin	2,500	(Iran) Mahmoud Khorakchi	–	11th
Shahrvand	Sari	Sayed Rasoul Hosseini	5,000	(Iran) Mehdi Abtahi	(Iran) Mahmoud Lotfi	Replaced for Zam Zam Isfahan
Tasisat Daryaei	Tehran	Handball Federation	–	(Iran) Vahid Shamsaei	–	10

=== Number of teams by region ===
	Region	Number of teams	Teams
1	Tehran	3	Misagh, Shahid Mansouri, Tasisat Daryaei
2	East Azerbaijan	3	Dabiri, Paya Sazeh, Mes Sungun
3	Razavi Khorasan	2	Farsh Ara, Ferdosi
4	Markazi	1	Shahrdari Saveh
5	Mazandaran	1	Shahrvand Sari
6	Qom	1	Mahan Tandis
7	Alborz	1	Moghavemat
8	Isfahan	1	Giti Pasand
9	Khuzestan	1	Melli Haffari

== Managerial changes ==
=== Before the start of the season ===
Team	Outgoing head coach	Manner of departure	Date of vacancy	Position in table	Incoming head coach	Date of appointment
Dabiri Tabriz	(Iran) Amir Shamsaei	Resigned	13 March 2014	Pre-season	(Iran) Hossein Shams	25 June 2014
Tasisat Daryaei	(Iran) Ali Sanei	Contract expired	13 March 2014	Pre-season	(Iran) Vahid Shamsaei	26 June 2014
Mahan Tandis	(Iran) Mohsen Hassanzadeh	Contract expired	13 March 2014	Pre-season	(Iran) Amir Shamsaei	12 July 2014
Giti Pasand Isfahan	(Iran) Reza Lak Aliabadi	Contract expired	13 March 2014	Pre-season	(Iran) Mohammad Keshavarz	4 August 2014
Misagh	(Iran) Mahmoud Khorakchi	Contract expired	13 March 2014	Pre-season	(Iran) Reza Lak Aliabadi	13 August 2014
Shahrvand Sari	(Iran) Masoud Najjarian	Contract expired	13 March 2014	Pre-season	(Iran) Mehdi Abtahi	21 August 2014

=== In season ===
Team	Outgoing head coach	Manner of departure	Date of vacancy	Position in table	Incoming head coach	Date of appointment	Position in table
Shahrdari Saveh	(Iran) Reza Oghabi	Resigned	29 September 2014	14	(Iran) Nader Mohammadi (temporary)	29 September 2014	14
Dabiri Tabriz	(Iran) Hossein Shams	Resigned	3 October 2014	5	(Iran) Shahram Dabiri Oskouei (temporary)	6 October 2014	6
Shahrdari Saveh	(Iran) Nader Mohammadi (temporary)	-	4 October 2014	14	(Iran) Mahmoud Khorakchi	4 October 2014	
Dabiri Tabriz	(Iran) Shahram Dabiri Oskouei (temporary)	-	15 October 2014	6	(Iran) Javad Asghari Moghaddam	15 October 2014	
Paya Sazeh	(Iran) Hossein Ghazaei	Resigned	18 October 2014	12	(Iran) Naser Rahnama	20 October 2014	
Mahan Tandis	(Iran) Amir Shamsaei	Adaptive	25 November 2014	2	(Iran) Vahid Ghiasi	25 November 2014	2
Mahan Tandis	(Iran) Vahid Ghiasi	Adaptive	9 November 2014	2	(Iran) Alireza Radi	10 December 2014	
Mes Sungun	(Iran) Esmaeil Taghipour	Expulsion	22 February 2015	3	(Iran) Naser Ranjbar (temporary)	22 February 2015	3
Mes Sungun	(Iran) Naser Ranjbar (temporary)	Expulsion	24 February 2015	3	(Iran) Hossein Shams	24 February 2015	

== League standings ==
Pos	Team	Pld	W	D	L	GF	GA	GD	Pts	Qualification or relegation
1	Tasisat Daryaei	26	14	9	3	64	40	+24	51	AFC Futsal Club Championship
2	Giti Pasand	26	14	8	4	87	60	+27	50	
3	Mes Sungun	26	14	3	9	73	69	+4	45	
4	Melli Haffari Iran	26	11	11	4	73	58	+15	44	
5	Shahid Mansouri	26	11	5	10	71	64	+7	38	
6	Mahan Tandis	26	11	5	10	77	78	−1	38	
7	Farsh Ara	26	10	6	10	75	73	+2	36	
8	Dabiri Tabriz	26	10	5	11	77	85	−8	35	
9	Misagh Tehran	26	9	6	11	50	55	−5	33	
10	Ferdosi	26	8	7	11	73	78	−5	31	
11	Shahrvand Sari	26	7	7	12	75	80	−5	28	
12	Moghavemat Alborz	26	7	6	13	58	78	−20	27	
13	Sh. Saveh	26	6	6	14	71	84	−13	24	Relegation to 1st Division 2015–16
14	Paya Sazeh	26	5	6	15	58	80	−22	21	Relegation to 1st Division 2015–16

Updated to match(es) played on 13 March 2015. Source:
Rules for classification: 1) points; 2) goal difference; 3) number of goals scored.

== Positions by round ==
Team ╲ Round	1	2	3	4	5	6	7	8	9	10	11	12	13	14	15	16	17	18	19	20	21	22	23	24	25	26
Tasisat Daryaei	2	6	10	6	5	4	3	3	3	3	3	1	1	1	1	1	1	1	1	1	1	1	1	1	1	1
Giti Pasand	3	1	3	2	4	3	4	6	4	4	6	6	4	3	3	4	3	2	2	3	2	2	2	2	2	2
Mes Sungun	9	4	4	3	2	2	2	2	2	1	1	3	7	6	4	3	2	4	4	4	3	3	3	3	3	3
Melli Haffari Iran	8	8	7	9	9	6	7	7	7	7	5	4	3	2	2	2	4	3	3	2	4	4	4	4	4	4
Shahid Mansouri	13	12	6	8	7	7	8	8	5	8	8	8	9	8	8	9	8	8	8	8	8	7	6	6	6	5
Mahan Tandis	1	2	1	1	1	1	1	1	1	2	2	2	2	4	5	6	5	5	5	5	5	5	5	5	5	6
Farsh Ara	12	11	5	7	6	8	5	4	6	5	7	7	5	5	6	7	7	6	6	6	7	8	8	8	8	7
Dabiri Tabriz	7	3	2	4	3	5	6	5	8	6	4	5	6	7	7	5	6	7	7	7	6	6	7	7	7	8
Misagh Tehran	14	14	9	10	10	9	9	9	9	10	9	9	8	10	9	8	9	9	9	10	10	10	9	9	9	9
Ferdosi	4	5	8	5	8	10	10	10	11	9	10	10	10	9	10	10	10	10	10	9	9	9	10	10	10	10
Shahrvand Sari	11	10	13	11	11	12	13	11	12	13	12	12	11	12	12	12	12	11	12	12	11	11	11	11	11	11
Moghavemat Alborz	5	7	12	13	13	13	12	13	13	12	11	11	12	11	11	11	11	12	11	11	12	12	12	12	12	12
Sh. Saveh	6	13	14	14	14	14	14	14	14	14	14	14	14	14	14	14	14	14	14	14	14	13	14	14	13	13
Paya Sazeh	10	9	11	12	12	11	11	12	10	11	13	13	13	13	13	13	13	13	13	13	13	14	13	13	14	14

Leader / 2015 AFC Futsal Club Championship
Relegation to the 2015–16 Iran Futsal's 1st Division

== Results table ==
Home \ Away	DAB	ARA	FER	SGP	TAN	HFR	MES	MIS	MOA	PSA	MAN	SHS	SAR	TST
Dabiri Tabriz		6–3	4–2	0–1	1–3	1–4	4–2		5–2	2–6		5–4	5–1	5–2
Farsh Ara	3–2		1–2	3–3	4–3	2–2	3–1	5–2	4–0		2–3	4–2	4–4	
Ferdosi	3–3	5–3		1–2	3–4	2–3	3–4	4–3		3–0	3–2		3–3	3–3
Giti Pasand	3–5	5–1				2–2	5–6	3–2	3–0 (Note: Moghavemat Alborz received a technical loss of 3-0 to Giti Pasand)	3–1	2–3	1–1	3–2	1–1
Mahan Tandis	4–1		5–1	3–3		2–2	2–0	2–1		5–2	2–4	3–3	5–3	1–3
Melli Haffari Iran	1–1	1–1		4–4	2–4		5–2	6–1	3–3	3–2	4–2		5–1	2–1
Mes Sungun	4–2	3–2	5–3	4–1		2–2			3–5	1–1	2–0	6–1	1–0	1–5
Misagh Tehran	2–2		3–3	2–4	4–1	1–1	2–1		2–1	2–1		0–3	2–2	0–2
Moghavemat Alborz	1–5	2–3	2–4	1–3	4–2	4–4	2–3	0–2			4–2	3–3		0–0
Paya Sazeh	5–4	2–4	3–3		2–1		2–2	1–2	1–2		2–2	5–3	1–3	1–3
Shahid Mansouri	2–3	3–1	3–2	1–6	1–3	3–1		1–1	3–4	2–0		10–6	2–0	
Sh. Saveh		4–1	3–4	1–4	5–3	3–4	2–5	0–2	1–4	6–3	3–3			2–2
Shahrvand Sari		1–1	3–3	5–7	4–4		4–5	4–3	5–2	6–2	3–3	5–4		2–3
Tasisat Daryaei	0–0	3–3	2–1		2–4	5–5		2–0	5–0	3–2	2–0	2–0	3–2	

Updated to match(es) played on 17 February 2015. Source: Futsal Planet
Legend: Blue = home team win; Yellow = draw; Red = away team win.

== Clubs season-progress ==
Team ╲ Round	1	2	3	4	5	6	7	8	9	10	11	12	13	14	15	16	17	18	19	20	21	22	23	24	25	26
Dabiri Tabriz	D	W	W	L	W	L	L	W	L	W	W	W	D	L	D	W	L	L	L	W	D	W				
Farsh Ara	L	D	W	D	W	L	W	W	L	W	D	W	W	L	D	L	D	W	D	L	L	L				
Ferdosi	W	L	L	W	L	L	D	L	D	W	L	W	L	W	L	W	D	D	L	W	D	D				
Giti Pasand	W	W	D	W	L	W	L	L	W	D	D	W	W	W	D	D	W	W	D	L	W	W				
Mahan Tandis	W	W	W	W	W	W	W	L	D	L	D	L	W	L	L	L	W	L	W	D	D	W				
Melli Haffari Iran	D	D	D	D	D	W	D	W	D	W	W	W	W	W	D	D	D	W	L	W	D	L				
Mes Sungun	D	W	W	W	D	W	W	L	W	W	L	L	L	D	W	W	W	L	L	W	W	L				
Misagh Tehran	L	L	W	L	D	W	D	W	L	L	W	D	D	L	W	W	D	L	L	L	W	L				
Moghavemat Alborz	D	D	L	L	L	L	W	L	L	W	W	L	L	W	D	L	W/O	L	W	W	L	D				
Paya Sazeh	D	D	L	L	L	W	D	L	W	L	L	L	L	D	L	L	L	W	W	L	L	L				
Shahid Mansouri	L	D	W	D	W	L	L	W	W	L	L	D	L	W	W	L	W	D	W	L	L	W				
Sh. Saveh	D	L	L	L	L	L	L	W	L	L	L	L	L	L	D	W	L	D	W	D	D	W				
Shahrvand Sari	L	D	L	D	D	L	L	W	D	L	W	L	W	L	D	L	L	W	L	D	W	D				
Tasisat Daryaei	W	L	L	W	W	W	W	L	W	D	D	W	W	W	D	W	W	D	W	D	D	D				

Updated to match(es) played on 17 February 2015. Source:
W = Win; D = Draw; L = Lose; W/O = Withdrew

== Awards ==
Iranian Futsal Super League
2014–15 champions

First title

- Winner: Tasisat Daryaei
- Runners-up: Giti Pasand Isfahan
- Third-Place: Mes Sungun
- Top scorer: (Iran) Moslem Rostamiha (Mes Soongoun) (25)
- Best Player: (Iran) Alireza Vafaei (Mahan Tandis)
- Best Manager: (Iran) Vahid Shamsaei (Tasisat Daryaei)
- Best Goal Keeper: (Iran) Mostafa Nazari (Tasisat Daryaei)
- Best Young Player: (Iran) Moslem Rostamiha (Mes Soongoun)

== See also ==
- 2014–15 Futsal's 1st Division
- 2015 Futsal's 2nd Division
- 2014–15 Persian Gulf Cup
- 2014–15 Azadegan League
- 2014–15 Iran Football's 2nd Division
- 2014–15 Iran Football's 3rd Division
- 2014–15 Hazfi Cup
- Iranian Super Cup
