= 2016–17 Iranian Futsal Super League =

Iranian Futsal Super League
- Season: 2016–17
- Champions: Giti Pasand
- Relegated: Tarh va Toseh Sabz; Azad University
- 2017 AFC Futsal Club Championship: Giti Pasand
- Matches: 182
- Goals: 1,009 (5.54 per match)
- Top goalscorer: Mahdi Javid (36 goals)
- Biggest home win: Melli Haffari 11 - 0 Azad University
- Biggest away win: Tarh va Toseh Sabz 2 - 8 Giti Pasand; Shahrvand 2 - 8 Giti Pasand
- Highest scoring: Shahrvand 9 - 6 Labaniyat Arjan
- Longest winning run: 10 Games Giti Pasand (1st week~10th week)
- Longest unbeaten run: 11 Games Giti Pasand (1st week~11th week)
- Longest winless run: 12 Games Azarakhsh (2nd week~13th week); Tarh va Toseh Sabz (14th week~25th week)
- Longest losing run: 9 Games Azad University (7th week~15th week); Azarakhsh (5th week~13th week); Tarh va Toseh Sabz (16th week~25th week)

The 2016–17 Iranian Futsal Super League are the 18th season of the Iran Pro League and the 13th under the name Futsal Super League. Tasisat Daryaei are the defending champions. The season will feature 12 teams from the 2015–16 Iranian Futsal Super League and two new teams promoted from the 2015–16 Iran Futsal's 1st Division: Labaniyat Arjan and Shahrdari.

== Teams ==
=== Stadia, locations and Personnel ===
Locations of clubs in 2016–17 Iranian Futsal Super League

Team	City	Venue	Capacity	Head coach	Team captain	Past Season
Azad University	Tehran	Payambar Azam	2,000	(Iran) Mahmoud Ghazi	(Iran) Hadi Bafandeh	Replaced for Shahid Mansouri
Azarakhsh	Sarkhun	Fajr	4,000	(Iran) Abbas Rouzpeikar	(Iran) Mohammad Baniasadi	7th
Dabiri	Tabriz	Oloum Pezeshki	2,000	(Iran) Javad Asghari Moghaddam	(Iran) Javad Asghari Moghaddam	4th
Farsh Ara	Mashhad	Shahid Beheshti	6,000	(Iran) Majid Mortezaei	(Iran) Ghodrat Bahadori	11th
Giti Pasand	Isfahan	Pirouzi	4,300	(Iran) Reza Lak Aliabadi	(Iran) Afshin Kazemi	3rd
Labaniyat Arjan	Shiraz	Shahid Abolfathi	–	(Iran) Hamid Reza Kamali	–	Promoted
Melli Haffari	Ahvaz	Emam Reza	1,000	(Iran) Kiyavash Alasvand	(Iran) Farid Namazi	5th
Mes Sungun	Varzaqan	Shahid Pour Sharifi	6,000	(Iran) Alireza Afzal	(Iran) Babak Nassiri	2nd
Moghavemat	Karaj	Enghelab Eslami	2,500	(Iran) Reza Fallahzadeh	(Iran) Hamid Bakhshi	10th
Shahrdari	Saveh	Fajr-e Felestin	2,500	(Iran) Mohsen Hassanzadeh	–	Promoted
Shahrvand	Sari	Sayed Rasoul Hosseini	5,000	(Iran) Alireza Raadi	(Iran) Mahmoud Lotfi	12th
Tarh va Toseh Sabz	Alvand	Yadegar Emam	3,500	(Iran) Mahmoud Abdollahi	(Iran) Mostafa Ekhlasian	Replaced for Misagh
Tasisat Daryaei	Tehran	Handball Federation	–	(Iran) Vahid Shamsaei	(Iran) Vahid Shamsaei	Champion
Yasin Pishro	Qom	Shahid Heidarian	2,000	(Iran) Mohammad Reza Heidarian	(Iran) Saeid Ghasemi	6th

== League standings ==
Pos	Team	Pld	W	D	L	GF	GA	GD	Pts	Qualification or relegation
1	Giti Pasand (C)	26	19	3	4	112	63	+49	60	Qualification for the AFC Futsal Club Championship
2	Dabiri	26	19	2	5	91	55	+36	59	
3	Mes Sungun	26	18	4	4	73	41	+32	58	
4	Melli Haffari	26	18	3	5	101	50	+51	57	
5	Tasisat Daryaei	26	16	2	8	79	56	+23	50	
6	Shahrdari	26	14	6	6	86	68	+18	48	
7	Shahrvand	26	11	4	11	88	95	−7	37	
8	Labaniyat Arjan	26	11	2	13	81	82	−1	35	
9	Farsh Ara	26	9	7	10	64	67	−3	34	
10	Yasin Pishro	26	9	2	15	50	69	−19	29	
11	Moghavemat	26	5	6	15	45	82	−37	21	
12	Azarakhsh	26	4	3	19	42	83	−41	15	
13	Tarh va Toseh Sabz (R)	26	3	2	21	47	102	−55	11	Relegation to the 1st Division
14	Azad University (R)	26	2	2	22	55	101	−46	8	Relegation to the 1st Division

Updated to match(es) played on 13 March 2022. Source: Iranian Futsal News Agency
Rules for classification: 1) points; 2) goal difference; 3) number of goals scored.
(C) Champions; (R) Relegated

== Positions by round ==
Team ╲ Round	1	2	3	4	5	6	7	8	9	10	11	12	13	14	15	16	17	18	19	20	21	22	23	24	25	26
Giti Pasand	4	2	1	1	1	1	1	1	1	1	1	1	1	1	1	1	1	1	1	1	1	1	1	1	1	1
Dabiri	6	7	5	7	5	7	7	4	4	2	3	4	4	5	3	4	3	3	3	2	2	2	2	2	2	2
Mes Sungun	11	6	8	9	8	5	4	3	2	4	2	2	2	2	2	2	2	2	2	3	3	3	3	3	3	3
Melli Haffari	3	3	6	2	3	2	2	2	3	5	4	3	3	3	4	5	4	4	5	5	4	4	4	4	4	4
Tasisat Daryaei	13	9	7	3	2	4	3	5	5	3	5	5	5	4	5	3	5	5	4	4	5	5	5	5	5	5
Shahrdari	1	1	2	5	6	8	8	8	9	10	9	9	7	6	6	6	6	7	7	7	6	6	6	6	6	6
Shahrvand	9	14	11	8	9	6	5	6	6	6	6	6	6	7	7	7	7	6	6	6	7	7	7	7	7	7
Labaniyat Arjan	2	8	8	12	10	10	11	10	10	9	8	7	8	9	9	9	8	8	8	8	8	8	9	8	8	8
Farsh Ara	7	4	3	4	7	9	9	9	8	8	10	10	10	8	8	8	9	9	9	9	9	9	8	9	9	9
Yasin Pishro	8	5	4	6	4	3	6	7	7	7	7	8	9	10	10	10	10	10	10	10	10	10	10	10	10	10
Moghavemat	10	11	12	11	12	13	10	11	11	11	11	11	11	11	11	11	11	11	11	11	11	11	11	11	11	11
Azarakhsh	5	10	10	10	11	12	13	13	13	13	13	13	14	12	13	12	12	12	12	12	12	12	12	12	12	12
Azad University	14	13	14	13	13	11	12	12	12	12	12	12	13	14	14	14	14	14	14	14	13	13	13	13	13	13
Tarh va Toseh Sabz	12	12	13	14	14	14	14	14	14	14	14	14	12	13	12	13	13	13	13	13	14	14	14	14	14	14

Leader / 2017 AFC Futsal Club Championship
Relegation to the 2017–18 Iran Futsal's 1st Division

Updated to match(es) played on 14 January 2022. Source:

== Results table ==
Home \ Away	ARJ	UNI	AZA	DAB	ARA	SGP	HFR	MES	MOA	SHS	SAR	TVT	TST	YAS
Labaniyat Arjan		2–1	2–1	0–4	3–0	2–4	4–3	0–2	7–1	1–4	4–4	7–1	4–2	3–4
Azad University	1–4		3–4	1–2	3–4	3–3	2–4	0–1	2–3	4–5	2–0	2–4	3–4	3–5
Azarakhsh	2–3	1–1		3–4	1–1	1–3	1–3	1–3	3–3	1–3	4–5	4–1	2–7	1–0
Dabiri	6–4	2–1	8–2		3–2	7–5	4–1	2–1	4–0	7–2	5–0	3–0 (Note: Tarh va Toseh Sabz received a technical loss of 3-0 to Dabiri.)	4–3	7–2
Farsh Ara	3–2	4–2	5–2	2–2		1–3	2–1	1–1	6–3	1–2	6–2	3–2	0–1	2–1
Giti Pasand	6–3	9–5	3–1	6–3	5–2		0–6 (Note: The game score was 3-5.)	3–1	3–3	6–3	5–0	7–2	3–2	5–0
Melli Haffari	6–3	11–0	6–2	1–1	3–2	3–1		4–2	6–1	4–1	2–2	4–0	1–2	5–3
Mes Sungun	2–1	6–4	2–0	3–0	2–2	4–2	5–2		2–1	5–1	3–1	3–1	3–2	1–3
Moghavemat	3–1	2–1	3–0	1–4	3–3	2–3	1–5	1–6		4–6	1–1	1–2	1–1	1–2
Shahrdari	4–4	5–0	1–0	4–1	5–4	2–4	3–3	1–1	1–1		9–3	6–0	3–2	0–0
Shahrvand	9–6	8–6	4–2	5–0 (Note: The game score was 6-6.)	8–4	2–8	3–4	2–3	4–3	4–4		7–1	3–5	3–2
Tarh va Toseh Sabz	1–5	4–1	1–2	2–3	1–1	2–8	2–4	4–4	1–2	4–5	3–5		3–4	2–3
Tasisat Daryaei	8–3	2–3	3–0	2–1	4–1	1–1	3–5	0–2	5–0	4–3	2–1	5–3		4–3
Yasin Pishro	0–3 (Note: The game score was 4-3.)	2–1	5–1	2–4	2–2	2–6	0–4	2–5	3–0	0–3 (Note: Yasin Pishro received a technical loss of 3-0 to Shahrdari.)	1–2	3–0	0–1	

Updated to match(es) played on 14 January 2022. Source: Futsal Planet
Legend: Blue = home team win; Yellow = draw; Red = away team win.

== Clubs season-progress ==
Team ╲ Round	1	2	3	4	5	6	7	8	9	10	11	12	13	14	15	16	17	18	19	20	21	22	23	24	25	26
Labaniyat Arjan	W	L	L	L	D	L	L	W	D	W	W	W	L	L	W	L	W	L	W	L	W	L	L	W	W	L
Azad University	L	L	L	D	L	W	L	L	L	L	L	L	L	L	L	W	L	L	L	L	D	L	W	L	L	L
Azarakhsh	W	L	L	D	L	L	L	L	L	L	L	L	L	W	L	D	W	W	L	L	L	L	D	L	L	L
Dabiri	W	L	W	L	W	L	W	W	W	W	D	W	W	L	W	D	W	W	W	W	W	W	L	W	W	W
Farsh Ara	D	W	W	D	L	L	L	D	W	L	D	D	L	W	W	D	D	L	W	L	W	L	W	L	W	L
Giti Pasand	W	W	W	W	W	W	W	W	W	W	D	L	W	D	W	W	L	W	W	W	D	W	L	W	L	W
Melli Haffari	W	W	L	W	D	W	W	W	L	L	W	W	W	D	L	D	W	W	L	W	W	W	W	W	W	W
Mes Sungun	L	W	D	D	W	W	W	W	W	L	W	W	W	W	D	W	D	W	W	L	W	L	W	W	W	W
Moghavemat	L	L	L	W	L	L	D	D	W	W	L	D	L	D	L	D	L	L	W	L	L	W	D	L	L	L
Shahrdari	W	W	D	L	D	L	D	D	D	L	W	D	W	W	W	L	W	L	L	W	W	W	W	W	W	W
Shahrvand	L	L	W	W	D	W	W	D	L	W	W	L	L	D	L	D	W	W	L	W	L	W	L	W	L	L
Tarh va Toseh Sabz	L	L	L	L	L	W	L	L	L	L	L	D	W	L	D	L	L	L	L	L	L	W/O	L	L	L	W
Tasisat Daryaei	L	W	W	W	W	L	W	L	W	W	D	D	W	W	L	W	L	W	W	W	L	W	L	L	W	W
Yasin Pishro	D	W	W	L	W	W	L	L	L	W	L	D	L	L	W	L	L	L	L	W	L	L	W	L	W/O	L

Updated to match(es) played on 14 January 2022. Source:
W = Win; D = Draw; L = Lose; W/O = Withdrew

== Awards ==
Iranian Futsal Super League
2016–17 champions
Giti Pasand
Second title

- Winner: Giti Pasand
- Runners-up: Dabiri
- Third-Place: Mes Sungun
- Top scorer: (Iran) Mahdi Javid (Giti Pasand) (36 goals)
- Best player: (Iran) Ali Asghar Hassanzadeh (Giti Pasand)
- Best manager: (Iran) Reza Lak Aliabadi (Giti Pasand)
- Best goalkeeper: (Iran) Sepehr Mohammadi (Giti Pasand)
- Best young player: (Iran) Moslem Oladghobad (Shahrdari Saveh)
- Best team: Giti Pasand
- Fairplay man: (Iran) Mohammad Taheri (Shahrvand)
- Fairplay team: Farsh Ara

== See also ==
- 2016–17 Iran Futsal's 1st Division
- 2017 Futsal's 2nd Division
- 2016–17 Persian Gulf Cup
- 2016–17 Azadegan League
- 2016–17 Iran Football's 2nd Division
- 2016–17 Iran Football's 3rd Division
- 2016–17 Hazfi Cup
- Iranian Super Cup 2016
