= Setaregan Varamin FSC =

Iranian futsal club

Setaregan
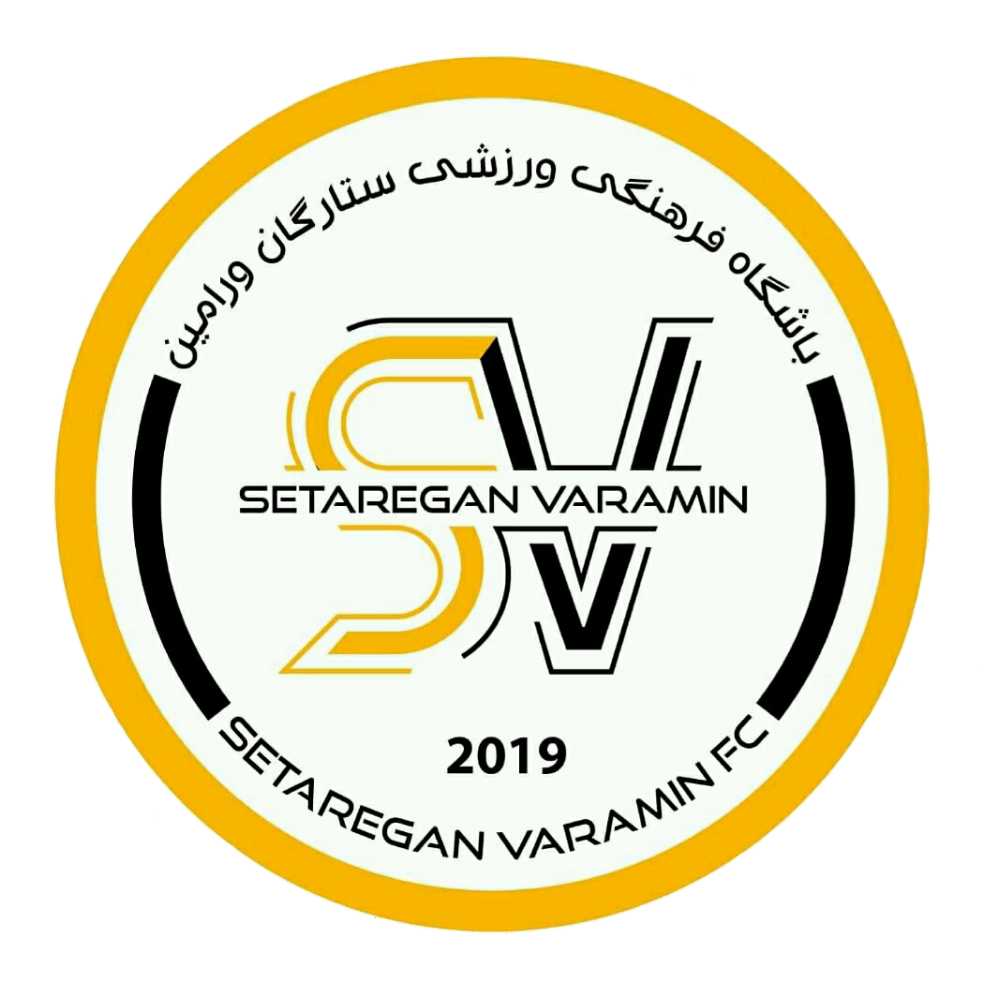
- Full name: Setaregan Varamin Futsal Club
- Nickname(s): ستارگان (Stars)
- Founded: 2019
- Dissolved: 2020
- Ground: Shahid Amir Golabbasi Indoor Stadium, Varamin
- Capacity: 1,500

Setaregan Varamin Futsal Club (Persian: باشگاه فوتسال ستارگان ورامین) was an Iranian professional futsal club based in Varamin.

== Season by season ==
The table below chronicles the achievements of the Club in various competitions.

Season	League	Position	Notes
2019–20	Super League	3rd	Replaced for Moghavemat Qarchak

Last updated: May 17, 2021

Champions	Runners-up	Third Place	Fourth Place	Relegation	Promoted	Did not qualify	not held
