= Sipar Khujand =

Tajik futsal club

- Founded: 2013; 12 years ago
- Chairman: Zafar Rahmonov
- League: Tajikistan Futsal League
- 2018–2019: 2nd
Home colours	Away colours

FC Sipar is a Tajik futsal club based in Khujand. They currently play in Premier Tajikistan futsal league.

== Trophies ==
=== League ===
- 2017/2018 runner up
- 2018/2019 runner up

== Club management ==
Position	Name
President	(Tajikistan) Zafar Rahmonov
Team Director	(Tajikistan) Pulod Aliev
Head Coach	(Iran) Ali Lak
Team Manager	(Tajikistan) Valijon Valiev
Team Doctor	(Tajikistan) Dr.Ummat Pirov
