= Dabiri Tabriz FSC =

Iranian futsal club

Dabiri
- Full name: Dabiri Tabriz Futsal Club
- Founded: 1998
- Dissolved: 2017
- Ground: Oloum Pezeshki Indoor Stadium, Tabriz
- Capacity: 2,000

Dabiri Tabriz Futsal Club (Persian: باشگاه فوتسال دبیری تبریز) was an Iranian professional futsal club based in Tabriz.

== History ==
Dabiri, placed 14th in table in the 2011–12 season and relegated to the 1st Division. But by the increasing of the number of teams, futsal committee decided to stay at the Super league. They won Iranian Futsal Super League title for the first time in the 2013–14 season,– under the guidance of Vahid Shamsaei.

== Season-by-season ==
The table below chronicles the achievements of the club in various competitions.

| Season | League | Position | Hazfi | Asia | Notes |
|---|---|---|---|---|---|
| 1998–99 | Tabriz First Division | Champions | | | Promoted |
| 1999–00 | East Azerbaijan Local League | Champions | | | Promoted |
| 2000–01 | Local League | Champions | | | Promoted |
| 2001–02 | First Division | Champions | | | Promoted |
| 2002–03 | Premier League | ? |
| 2003–04 | First Division | ? | | | Promoted Play Off |
| 2004–05 | First Division | ? |
| 2005–06 | Did not enter |
| 2006–07 | Did not enter |
| 2007–08 | Did not enter |
| 2008–09 | First Division | ? |
| 2009–10 | First Division | 1st / Group A | | | Promoted Play Off |
| 2010–11 | Super League | 11th | | | bought Petroshimi Tabriz |
| 2011–12 | Super League | 14th |
| 2012–13 | Super League | 4th |
| 2013–14 | Super League | Champions | Withdrew | 3rd |
| 2014–15 | Super League | 8th |
| 2015–16 | Super League | 4th |
| 2016–17 | Super League | 2nd |

| Champions | Runners-up | Third Place | Fourth Place | Did not qualify | not held |

== Honours ==
=== Domestic ===
- Iranian Futsal Super League

Winners (1): 2013–14
Runners-up (1): 2016–17

- Iran Futsal's 1st Division

Winners (1): 2001-02

- Local League

Winners (1): 2000-01

- East Azerbaijan Local League

Winners (1): 1999

- Tabriz First Division

Winners (1): 1999

=== Continental ===
- AFC Futsal Club Championship

Third Place (1): 2014

=== Individual ===
Top Goalscorer

- Iranian Futsal Super League

2013–14 Iranian Futsal Super League
(Iran) Farhad Fakhimzadeh (26 goals)

Achievements
| Preceded by Giti Pasand | Iranian Futsal Super League; 13-14 (First title) | Succeeded by Tasisat Daryaei |
