= Shahid Poursharifi Arena =

Sports venue in Tabriz, Iran

Coordinates: 38°04′01″N 46°18′09″E

Shahid Pour Sharifi Arena
- Interactive map of Shahid Pour Sharifi Arena
- Full name: Shahid Poursharifi Arena
- Location: Tabriz, Iran
- Owner: Physical Education Organization
- Capacity: 6,000
- Surface: 11,009 m^{2}

Construction
- Opened: 7 June 2009

Tenants
- Mes Sungun; 16th Wrestle International Children's Day; 2014 Asian Men's Junior Handball Championship; 2018 AFC Futsal Championship qualification

The Shahid Pour Sharifi Arena is an indoor sports arena in Tabriz, Iran. It is the home stadium of Futsal Super League team Mes Sungun FSC. The stadium holds up to 6,000 people.

It hosted the Asian Men's Junior Handball Championship in August 2014.
