= Almas Shahr Qom FSC =

Iranian futsal club

Almas Shahr
- Full name: Almas Shahr Qom Futsal Club
- Nickname(s): الماس ها (Diamonds)
- Dissolved: 2019
- Ground: Shahid Jafar Heidarian Indoor Stadium, Qom
- Capacity: 2,000

Almas Shahr Futsal Club (Persian: باشگاه فوتسال الماس شهر) was an Iranian professional futsal club based in Qom.

== History ==
The club was originally known as Soheil, it was renamed Eram Kish due to change of sponsorship. In the 2010–11 Iranian Futsal Super League they were renamed again to Kish Air. In the May 12, 2011 they were renamed again to Saba. In the August 26, 2013 they were renamed to Mahan Tandis. In the July, 2015 they were renamed to Atoliyeh Tehran for 3 weeks. then they were renamed to "Yasin Pishro". In the 2017–18 Iranian Futsal Super League they were renamed again to Heyat Football and relegation to Iran Futsal's 1st Division. In the 2018–19 Iran Futsal's 1st Division they were renamed again to Almas Shahr.

== Crest ==
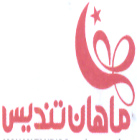
2013–2015

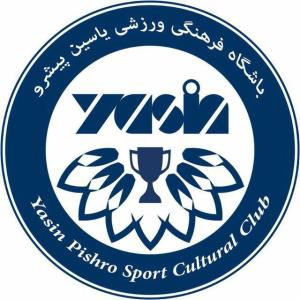
2015–2017

== Season-by-season ==
The table below chronicles the achievements of the Club in various competitions.

Season	League										Hazfi	League's top goalscorer		Manager
Season	Division		P	W	D	L	GF	GA	Pts	Pos	Hazfi	Name	Goals	Manager
2003–04	Super League		22	10	7	5	101	80	37	3rd				Hossein Shams
2004–05	Super League		26	16	2	8	105	88	50	2nd		Vahid Shamsaei	38	Hossein Shams
2005–06	Super League		26	8	3	15	93	101	27	12th				Hossein Hosseini / Sadegh Varmazyar
2007–08	Super League		25	12	5	8	87	74	41	4th				Reza Kordi / Amir Shamsaei
2008–09	Super League		22	13	4	5	88	60	43	2nd				Mehdi Abtahi
2009–10	Super League		26	7	5	14	67	92	26	12th				Reza Kordi / Vahid Ghiasi / Abolfazl Sani / Amir Shamsaei
2010–11	Super League		Renamed Kish Air									Saeid Taghizadeh	15	Reza Kordi / Vahid Ghiasi
2010–11	Super League		23	7	4	12	70	68	25	10th		Saeid Taghizadeh	15	Reza Kordi / Vahid Ghiasi
2011–12	Super League		Renamed Saba									Mohammad Kouhestani	21	Mahdi Ghiasi / Hossein Ganjian
2011–12	Super League		26	12	3	11	83	81	39	6th		Mohammad Kouhestani	21	Mahdi Ghiasi / Hossein Ganjian
2012–13	Super League		24	18	2	4	124	66	56	2nd		Ali Asghar Hassanzadeh	28	Amir Shamsaei / Ghodratollah Bagheri / Mohsen Hassanzadeh
2013–14	Super League		Renamed Mahan Tandis								Champions	Mohammad Kermani	23	Reza Kordi / Vahid Ghiasi / Mohsen Hassanzadeh
2013–14	Super League		26	12	4	10	91	77	40	6th	Champions	Mohammad Kermani	23	Reza Kordi / Vahid Ghiasi / Mohsen Hassanzadeh
2013–14	Hazfi Cup	Round of 32	Mahan Tandis 4 – 2 Persepolis Behzisti								Champions	Mohammad Kermani / Alireza Vafaei	5	Mohsen Hassanzadeh
2013–14	Hazfi Cup	Round of 16	Shahin Kermanshah 2 – 7 Mahan Tandis								Champions	Mohammad Kermani / Alireza Vafaei	5	Mohsen Hassanzadeh
2013–14	Hazfi Cup	1/4 Final	Mahan Tandis 7 – 0 Nezam Mohandesi Kermanshah								Champions	Mohammad Kermani / Alireza Vafaei	5	Mohsen Hassanzadeh
2013–14	Hazfi Cup	Semi-Final	Shahrdari Tabriz 7 - 7 (a) Mahan Tandis								Champions	Mohammad Kermani / Alireza Vafaei	5	Mohsen Hassanzadeh
2013–14	Hazfi Cup	Fifth Round	Misagh Tehran 3 (1) – (4) 3 p Mahan Tandis								Champions	Mohammad Kermani / Alireza Vafaei	5	Mohsen Hassanzadeh
2014–15	Super League		26	11	5	10	77	78	38	6th		Alireza Vafaei	24	Amir Shamsaei / Vahid Ghiasi / Alireza Raadi
2015–16	Super League		Renamed Atoliyeh Tehran (for 4 weeks) and Yasin Pishro									Mohammad Kouhestani	20	Mahdi Ghiasi
2015–16	Super League		25	11	4	10	79	77	37	6th		Mohammad Kouhestani	20	Mahdi Ghiasi
2016–17	Super League		26	8	2	16	45	69	26	10th		Amin Majidipour	8	Mohammad Reza Heidarian
2017–18	Super League		Renamed Heyat Football Qom									Farhad Falamarzi	8	Abolfazl Sani / Mahdi Ghiasi
2017–18	Super League		26	2	4	20	42	95	10	14^{1}		Farhad Falamarzi	8	Abolfazl Sani / Mahdi Ghiasi
2018–19	1st Division		Renamed Almas Shahr Qom									Abolfazl Rezaeian	11	Bahram Vafaei / Vahid Ghiasi / Mohammad Reza Ghasemi
2018–19	1st Division		16	2	3	11	30	56	9	8^{1}		Abolfazl Rezaeian	11	Bahram Vafaei / Vahid Ghiasi / Mohammad Reza Ghasemi
Super league total			349	147	54	148	1152	1106	495					
Hazfi cup total			6	4	1	1	28	14	13					
1st Division total			16	2	3	11	30	56	9					
Total			371	153	58	160	1210	1176	517					

Notes:
* unofficial titles
1 worst title in history of club

Key

- P = Played
- W = Games won
- D = Games drawn
- L = Games lost
- GF = Goals for
- GA = Goals against
- Pts = Points
- Pos = Final position

Champions	Runners-up	Third Place	Fourth Place	Relegation	Promoted	Did not qualify	not held

== Honours ==
=== Domestic ===
- Iranian Futsal Super League

Runners-up (3): 2004–05, 2008–09, 2012–13

- Iranian Futsal Hazfi Cup

Winners (1): 2013–14

=== Individual ===
Top Goalscorer

- Iranian Futsal Super League

2004–05 Iranian Futsal Super League
(Iran) Vahid Shamsaei (38 goals)
2012–13 Iranian Futsal Super League
(Iran) Ali Asghar Hassanzadeh (28 goals)

== All-time record ==
=== Head to head records ===
As of 2 September 2019

Team	Played	Won	Drawn	Lost	GF	GA	Diff
Shahrvand Sari	28						
Shahid Mansouri Gharchak	24						
Melli Haffari Iran	20						
Giti Pasand Isfahan	16						
Arjan Shiraz	14						
Farsh Ara Mashhad	14						
Foolad Mahan Isfahan	14						
Dabiri Tabriz	14						
Sadra Shiraz	14						
Misagh Tehran	11						
Shahrdari Saveh	11						
Elmo Adab Mashhad	10						
Tasisat Daryaei Tehran	10						
Persepolis Tehran	9						
Esteghlal Tehran	8						
Mes Sungun	8						
Tam Iran Khodro Tehran	8						
Moghavemat Alborz	8						
Azad University Tehran	8						
Rah Ahan Tehran	8						
Gostaresh Foolad Tabriz	8						
Shensa Saveh	7						
Azarakhsh Bandar Abbas	6						
Firooz Sofeh Isfahan	6						
Zoghalsang Kerman	6						
Poushineh Baft Qazvin	6						
Sazman Bazargani Azerbaijan Sharghi	6						
Shahrdari Tabriz	6						
Chini Hamgam Shahrekord	4						
Pegah Gilan	4						
Hilal Ahmar Tabriz	4						
Ferdosi Mashhad	4						
Atoliyeh Tehran Qom	2						
Shahrdari Tonekabon	2						
Pas Tehran	2						
Shahr Aftab Tehran	2						
Petroshimi Tabriz	2						
Sazman Bazargani Gilan	2						
Fajr Ghaem Galoogah	2						
Zam Zam Isfahan	2						
Gaz Khozestan	2						
Paya Sazeh Tabriz	2						
Amaliyat Qeyr Sanati Mahshahr	2						
Moghavemat Qarchak	2						
Tarh va Toseh Sabz Alvand Qazvin	2						
Parsian Shahr-e Qods	2						
Hyper Shahr Shahin Shahr	2						
Naft Omidiyeh	2						
Khales Sazan Zanjan	2						
Shahrdari Rasht	2						
Nam Avaran Resalat Mazandaran	2						
PAS Naja Alborz	2						
Hebelex Razavi Mashhad	2						
Arash Beton Qazvin	1						
Kashi Nilou Isfahan	1						
Shahin Kermanshah	1						
Nezam Mohandesi Kermanshah	1						
Total							

== Players ==
=== Players on international cups ===
Cup	Players
(Macau) AFC Championship 2004	(Iran) Vahid Shamsaei
(Chinese Taipei) World Cup 2004	(Iran) Vahid Shamsaei
(Uzbekistan) AFC Championship 2006	(Iran) Ali Asghar Hassanzadeh
(Japan) AFC Championship 2007	(Iran) Majid Latifi (Iran) Mostafa Nazari
(Thailand) AFC Championship 2008	(Iran) Ali Asghar Hassanzadeh (Iran) Majid Latifi (Iran) Mostafa Nazari
(Brazil) World Cup 2008	(Iran) Ali Asghar Hassanzadeh (Iran) Majid Latifi (Iran) Mostafa Nazari
(United Arab Emirates) AFC Championship 2012	(Iran) Ali Asghar Hassanzadeh
(Thailand) World Cup 2012	(Iran) Ali Asghar Hassanzadeh
(Vietnam) AFC Championship 2014	(Iran) Alireza Vafaei
(Uzbekistan) AFC Championship 2016	(Iran) Alireza Vafaei

=== Notable players ===
- (Iran) Mohsen Hassanzadeh
- (Iran) Hossein Sabouri
- (Iran) Vahid Shamsaei
- (Iran) Ali Asghar Hassanzadeh
- (Iran) Vahid Ghiasi
- (Iran) Alireza Vafaei
- (Iran) Meysam Ilanlou
- (Iran) Saeid Taghizadeh
- (Iran) Mostafa Nazari
- (Iran) Majid Latifi
- (Iran) Ali Rahnama
- (Iran) Ali Ebrahimbeigi
- (Iran) Taha Nematian
- (Iran) Mohammad Dehghan
- (Iran) Abolghasem Orouji
- (Iran) Saeid Ghasemi
- (Iran) Ruhollah Isari
- (Iran) Mojtaba Nassirnia
- (Iran) Ebrahim Masoudi
- (Iran) Moslem Oladghobad
- (Iran) Masoud Daneshvar
