= Taha Nematian =

Iranian futsal player

Personal information
- Full name: Mohammad Taha Nematian Jelodar
- Date of birth: 8 February 1995 (age 31)
- Place of birth: Qom, Iran
- Height: 1.84 m (6 ft 0 in)
- Position: Left Flank

Team information
- Current team: Naft Al Wasat

Youth career
- 2013–2015: Mahan Tandis

Senior career*
Years	Team	Apps	(Gls)
2013–2015	Mahan Tandis		(0)
2015–2016	Moghavemat Alborz		(0)
2016–2017	Moghavemat Qarchak		(3)
2017–2018	Ana Sanat		(14)
2018–2019	Moghavemat Qarchak		(6)
2019	Araz Naxçivan		
2019–2022	Sunich		(24)
2022–	Naft Al Wasat		(0)

International career^{‡}
2015–	Iran		(2)
- * Club domestic league appearances and goals as of 8 October 2022 ‡ National team caps and goals as of 17 October 2020

Mohammad Taha Nematian (Persian: محمد طه نعمتیان; born 8 February 1995) is an Iranian professional futsal player. He is currently a member of Naft Al Wasat in the Iraq Futsal League.

== Honours ==
=== Club ===
- Azerbaijan Futsal Premier League
  - Champion (1): 2018–19 (Araz Naxçivan)
- Iran Futsal's 1st Division
  - Champion (1): 2016–17 (Moghavemat Qarchak)

== International goals ==
As of 19 December 2021

No.	Date	Venue	Opponent	Result	Competition
1.	25 October 2019	Ghadir Arena, Urmia, Iran	Kyrgyzstan	8-3	2020 AFC Futsal Championship qualification
2.	7 October 2020	Uzbekistan Stadium, Tashkent, Uzbekistan	Uzbekistan	2-1	Friendly
