= 2013–14 Iranian Futsal Hazfi Cup =

Tournament details
- Country: Iran

Final positions
- Champions: Mahan Tandis Qom (1st title)
- Runners-up: Misagh Tehran

Tournament statistics
- Matches played: 38
- Goals scored: 255 (6.71 per match)

The 2013–14 Iranian Futsal Hazfi Cup were the 1st season of the Iranian futsal knockout competition. Mahan Tandis Qom won the title with defeating Misagh Tehran in the final.

== Participating teams ==
Totally 67 teams participate in the 2013–14 season. These teams are divided into three main groups which are introduced here. Teams in bold are still active in the competition:

Group 1 (Start their matches from the first round)

- In total 16 teams (16 teams from 16 different provinces in Iran (each province: one)).
- Computer Shahram Alborz (Alborz Province)
- Kiyan Ardabil (Ardabil Province)
- Urom Alyazh Urmia (West Azerbaijan Province)
- Farid Lahijan (Gilan Province)
- Sorkhpoushan Hamadan (Hamadan Province)
- Taid Water Hormozgan (Hormozgan Province)
- Moghavemat Basij Ilam (Ilam Province)
- Sheydan Isfahan (Isfahan Province)
- Arg Birjand (South Khorasan Province)
- Nezam Mohandesi Kermanshah (Kermanshah Province)
- Foolad Sadat Gachsaran (Kohgiluyeh and Boyer-Ahmad Province)
- Payam Valiasr Arak (Markazi Province)
- Setaregan Bartar Garmsar (Semnan Province)
- Shahrdari Iranshahr (Sistan and Baluchistan Province)
- Labaniyat Aala Abarkuh (Yazd Province)
- Khales Sazan Zanjan (Zanjan Province)

Group 2 (Start their matches from the second or third round)

- In total 37 teams (All teams playing in Iran Futsal's 2nd Division & Iran Futsal's 1st Division):

Iran Futsal's 2nd Division

- Afagh Tehran
- Azarakhsh Bandar Abbas
- Barobon Qazvin
- Borna Khuzestan B
- Cut Shahrud
- Kiyan Isfahan
- Mes Rafsanjan
- Milad Nour Markazi
- Moghavemat Qarchak
- Pas Qavamin
- Polad Gostaresh Borujerd
- Safa Tos
- Shahid Faraji
- Shahid Jahan Nejhadiyan
- Shahin Lordegan
- Shahin Kermanshah
- Shahin Kuhdasht
- Shahrdari Rasht
- Shohada Jalin Gorgan

Iran Futsal's 1st Division

- Ali Sadr Hamadan
- Arjan Shiraz
- Bargh Shiraz
- Borna Khuzestan
- Eisatis Yazd
- Ferdosi Mashhad
- Iran Jahan Mashhad
- Kashi Nilou Isfahan
- Keshavarz Qazvin
- Kiyan Pelast
- Moghavemat Alborz
- Moghavemat Kerman
- Naft Omidiyeh
- Shahrdari Isfahan
- Penthouse Mashhad
- Persepolis Behzisti
- Shahrdari Neka
- Zagros Khuzestan

Group 3 (Start their matches from the fourth round)

- In total 14 teams (All teams playing in Iranian Futsal Super League):

Iranian Futsal Super League

- Dabiri Tabriz
- Farsh Ara Mashhad
- Giti Pasand Isfahan
- Hilal Ahmar Tabriz
- Mahan Tandis Qom
- Melli Haffari Iran
- Misagh Tehran
- Amaliyat Qeyr Sanati Mahshahr
- Rah Sari
- Shahid Mansouri Qarchak
- Shahrdari Saveh
- Shahrdari Tabriz
- Tasisat Daryaei
- Zam Zam Isfahan

== First stage ==
=== First round ===
Team 1	Agg.	Team 2	1st leg	2nd leg
Foolad Sadat Gachsaran	9 - 0	Taid Water Hormozgan	6-0	3-0
Sheydan Isfahan	(w/o)^{1}	Khales Sazan Zanjan	-	-
Computer Shahram Alborz	1 - 3	Moghavemat Basij Ilam	1-3	(w/o)^{2}
Farid Lahijan	2 - 4	Payam Valiasr Arak	1-3	1-1
Kiyan Ardabil	4 - 3	Arg Birjand	4-3	(w/o)^{3}
Sorkhpoushan Hamadan	4 - 3	Labaniyat Aala Abarkuh	3-1	1-2
Shahrdari Iranshahr	6 - 7	Nezam Mohandesi Kermanshah	4-3	2-4
Setaregan Bartar Garmsar	8 - 7	Urom Alyazh Urmia	5-4	3-3

^{1} Sheydan Isfahan withdrew.
^{2} Computer Shahram Alborz withdrew after 1st leg.
^{3} Kiyan Ardabil withdrew after 1st leg

=== Second round ===
19 January 2014 1	Cut Shahrud	5 – 2	Afagh Tehran	Shahrud
17:00	Hossein Ghasemi; Salman Khoram; Mohammadreza Khodaveri; Meysam Safari; Ibrahim Falamarzpour	Report		Stadium: Shahid Akbari Arena

19 January 2014 2	Naft Omidiyeh	2 – 1	Polad Gostaresh Borujerd	Omidiyeh
15:00		Report		Stadium: Naft Arena

19 January 2014 3	Milad Nor Markazi	3 – 0 (w/o)	Zagros Khozestan	Arak
15:00
Note: Zagros Khozestan withdrew

19 January 2014 4	Shahin Kermanshah	7 – 2	Shahid Jahan Nejhadiyan Abadan	Kermanshah
15:00		Report		Stadium: Qamar Bani Hashem Arena

21 January 2014 5	Sorkhpoushan Hamedan	5 – 6	Nezam Mohandesi Kermanshah	Hamedan
15:00		Report		Stadium: Enghelab Arena

21 January 2014 6	Moghavemat Alborz	0 – 3 (w/o)	Shahin Kuhdasht	Karaj
15:00		Report		Stadium: Enghelab Arena
Note: Moghavemat Alborz withdrew

20 January 2014 7	Shahin Lordegan	3 – 0 (w/o)	Safa Tos Mashhad	Lordegan
15:00				Stadium: Takhti Arena
Note: Safa Tos Mashhad withdrew

19 January 2014 8	Moghavemat Basij Ilam	3 – 0 (w/o)	Shahrdari Neka	Ilam
15:00		Report		Stadium: Shahid Falavizan Arena
Note: Shahrdari Neka withdrew

21 January 2014 9	Moghavemat Qarchak	3 – 0 (w/o)	Kashi Nilo Isfahan	Qarchak
15:00		Report		Stadium: 7th Tir Arena
Note: Kashi Nilo Isfahan withdrew

20 January 2014 10	Kiyan Isfahan	3 – 0 (w/o)	Barobon Qazvin	Isfahan
15:00				Stadium: Atashneshani Arena
Note: Barobon Qazvin withdrew

20 January 2014 11	Pas Qavamin Tehran	3 – 0 (w/o)	Penthouse Mashhad	Tehran
15:00		Report		Stadium: Dastgerdi Arena
Note: Penthouse Mashhad withdrew

19 January 2014 12	Keshavarz Qazvin	0 – 3 (w/o)	Nik Andish Shahrdari Isfahan	Qazvin
15:00		Report		Stadium: Shahid Babaei Arena
Note: Keshavarz Qazvin withdrew

20 January 2014 13	Setareghan Bartar Garmsar	4 - 6	Payam Valiasr Arak	Garmsar
15:00		Report	Ashkan Salehi 3 Iman Falahi 2 Mehrdad Heydari	Stadium: Shahid Bahonar Arena

=== Third round ===
26 January 2014 14	Borna Khozestan B	0 – 3 (w/o)	Cut Shahrud	Ahvaz
15:00		Report
Note: Borna Khozestan withdrew

27 January 2014 15	Naft Omidiyeh	3 – 0 (w/o)	Kiyan Pelast Sepahan Kashan	Omidiyeh
15:00		Report		Stadium: Naft Arena
Note: Kiyan Pelast withdrew

26 January 2014 16	Ferdosi Mashhad	3 – 0 (w/o)	Foolad Sadat Gachsaran	Mashhad
15:00		Report		Stadium: Kargaran Arena
Note: Foolad Sadat Gachsaran withdrew

27 January 2014 17	Iran Jahan Mashhad	3 – 0 (w/o)	Milad Nor Markazi	Mashhad
15:00				Stadium: Kosar Arena
Note: Milad Nor withdrew

24 January 2014 18	Arg Birjand	2 – 7	Shahin Kermanshah	Birjand
17:00		Report		Stadium: Shahid Ghasemi Arena

27 January 2014 19	Persepolis Behzisti	3 – 0 (w/o)	Moghavemat Kerman	Tehran
15:00				Stadium: Handball Arena
Note: Moghavemat Kerman withdrew

28 January 2014 20	Nezam Mohandesi Kermanshah	4 – 2	Eisatis Yazd	Kermanshah
15:00		Report	Hamed Pishdad 2	Stadium: Qamar Bani Hashem Arena

26 January 2014 21	Shahin Kuhdasht	3 – 0 (w/o)	Shahrdari Rasht	Kuhdasht
15:00		Report
Note: Shahrdari Rasht withdrew

27 January 2014 22	Shahin Lordegan	3 – 0 (w/o)	Arjan Shiraz	Lordegan
15:00				Stadium: Takhti Arena
Note: Arjan Shiraz withdrew

26 January 2014 23	Moghavemat Basij Ilam	3 – 0 (w/o)	Shohada Jalin Gorgan	Ilam
15:00				Stadium: Shahid Falavizan Arena
Note: Shohada Jalin Gorgan withdrew

26 January 2014 24	Shahid Faraji Qazvin	6 – 5 (a.e.t.)	Moghavemat Qarchak	Qazvin
15:00		Report		Stadium: Shahid Babaei Arena

26 January 2014 25	Kiyan Isfahan	0 – 3 (w/o)	Borna Khozestan	Isfahan
15:00				Stadium: Atashneshani Arena
Note: Kiyan Isfahan withdrew

27 January 2014 26	Azarakhsh Bandar Abbas	3 – 0 (w/o)	Bargh Shiraz	Bandar Abbas
15:00
Note: Bargh Shiraz withdrew

27 January 2014 27	Pas Qavamin	3 – 0 (w/o)	Mes Rafsanjan	Tehran
15:00
Note: Mes Rafsanjan withdrew

27 January 2014 28	Ali Sadr Hamedan	3 – 0 (w/o)	Nik Andish Shahrdari Isfahan	Hamedan
15:00				Stadium: Enghelab Arena
Note: Nik Andish withdrew

26 January 2014 29	Payam Valiasr Arak	2 – 2 (a.e.t.) (6 - 4 p)	Khales Sazan Zanjan	Arak
15:00		Report		Stadium: Aluminium Sazi Arena
Note: Nik Andish withdrew

== Second stage ==
=== Fourth round (round of 32) ===
2 February 2014 30	Cut Shahrud	3 – 0 (w/o)	Rah Sari	Shahrud
14:30		Report		Stadium: Shahid Akbari Arena
Note: Rah Sari withdrew

2 February 2014 31	Farsh Ara Mashhad	3 – 0 (w/o)	Naft Omidiyeh	Mashhad
15:00		Report		Stadium: Shahid Beheshti Arena
Note: Naft Omidiyeh withdrew

10 February 2014 32	Shahrdari Tabriz	3 – 1	Ferdosi Mashhad	Tabriz
15:00				Stadium: Shahid Pour Sharifi Arena

2 February 2014 33	Dabiri Tabriz	3 – 0 (w/o)	Iran Jahan Mashhad	Tabriz
15:00		Report		Stadium: Olom Pezeshki Arena
Note: Iran Jahan Mashhad withdrew

2 February 2014 34	Shahin Kermanshah	3 – 0 (w/o)	Melli Haffari Iran	Kermanshah
15:00		Report		Stadium: Qamar Bani Hashem Arena
Note: Melli Haffari withdrew

2 February 2014 35	Mahan Tandis Qom	4 – 2	Persepolis Behzisti	Qom
15:00	M. Kouhestani; A. Orouji; F. Falamarzi; S. Ghasemi	Report	Jasem Soltani	Stadium: Shahid Heidarian Arena

3 February 2014 36	Nezam Mohandesi Kermanshah	4 – 3 (a.e.t.)	Shahrdari Saveh	Kermanshah
15:00		Report		Stadium: Qamar Bani Hashem Arena

2 February 2014 37	Moghavemat Basij Ilam	3 – 0 (w/o)	Zam Zam Isfahan	Ilam
15:00		Report		Stadium: Shahid Ghasemi Arena
Note: Zam Zam withdrew

2 February 2014 38	Shahid Faraji Qazvin	3 – 6	Misagh Tehran	Qazvin
15:00	Sadegh Mohammadniya 2 Davood Dorodgar	Report		Stadium: Shahid Babaei Arena

2 February 2014 39	Amaliyat Qeyr Sanati	0 – 3 (w/o)	Borna Khozestan	Mahshahr
15:00		Report		Stadium: Besat Arena
Note: Amaliyat Qeyr Sanati withdrew

2 February 2014 40	Giti Pasand Isfahan	3 – 0 (w/o)	Azarakhsh Bandar Abbas	Isfahan
15:00		Report		Stadium: Pirouzi Arena
Note: Azarakhsh Bandar Abbas withdrew

2 February 2014 41	Pas Qavamin Tehran	3 – 0 (w/o)	Hilal Ahmar Tabriz	Tehran
15:00		Report		Stadium: Dastgerdi Arena
Note: Hilal Ahmar withdrew

2 February 2014 42	Ali Sadr Hamedan	3 – 0 (w/o)	Shahid Mansouri Gharchak	Hamedan
15:00		Report		Stadium: Enghelab Arena
Note: Shahid Mansouri withdrew

2 February 2014 43	Tasisat Daryaei	6 – 1	Payam Valiasr Arak	Tehran
17:00		Report		Stadium: Dastgerdi Arena

=== Fifth round (round of 16) ===
10 February 2014 44	Farsh Ara Mashhad	3 – 0 (w/o)	Cut Shahrud	Mashhad
14:30		Report		Stadium: Shahid Beheshti Arena
Note: Cut Shahrud withdrew

17 February 2014 45	Shahrdari Tabriz	3 – 0 (w/o)	Dabiri Tabriz	Tabriz
15:00		Report		Stadium: Shahid Pour Sharifi Arena
Note: Dabiri withdrew

10 February 2014 46	Shahin Kermanshah	2 – 7	Mahan Tandis Qom	Kermanshah
15:00		Report	A. Vafaei 2 M. Kermani 2 A. Ahmadi; A. Ebrahimbeigi; M. Oladghobad	Stadium: Qamar Bani Hashem Arena

12 February 2014 47	Nezam Mohandesi Kermanshah	9 – 4	Shahin Kuhdasht	Kermanshah
15:00		Report	M. Rezaei 3 M. Adinvand	Stadium: Qamar Bani Hashem Arena

10 February 2014 48	Shahin Lordegan	3 – 5	Moghavemat Ilam	Lordegan
15:00		Report		Stadium: Takhti Arena

10 February 2014 49	Misagh Tehran	4 – 3	Borna Khuzestan	Tehran
15:00				Stadium: Shahrdari Mantaghe 11 Arena

10 February 2014 50	Giti Pasand Isfahan	0 – 3 (w/o)	Pas Qavamin Tehran	Isfahan
15:00		Report		Stadium: Pirouzi Arena
Note: Giti Pasand withdrew

10 February 2014 51	Tasisat Daryaei	3 - 2	Ali Sadr Hamedan	Tehran
15:00				Stadium: Dastgerdi Arena

=== Sixth round (1/4 Final - Last 8) ===
23 February 2014 52	Farsh Ara Mashhad	3 – 4 (a.e.t.)	Shahrdari Tabriz	Mashhad
17:00	N. Ajam 2 Gh. Bahadori 39'	Report		Stadium: Shahid Beheshti Arena

17 February 2014 53	Mahan Tandis Qom	7 – 0	Nezam Mohandesi Kermanshah	Qom
15:00	M. Kouhestani; A. Orouji; M. Kermani; A. Vafaei; M. Oladghobad; A. Ebrahimbeigi; M. Ramouz	Report		Stadium: Shahid Heidarian Arena

17 February 2014 54	Misagh Tehran	6 – 3	Moghavemat Ilam	Lordegan
15:00		Report		Stadium: Takhti Arena

17 February 2014 50	Pas Qavamin Tehran	1 – 5	Tasisat Daryaei	Isfahan
15:00		Report		Stadium: Shahid Dastgerdi Arena

=== Semi-final (1/2 Final - Last 4) ===
Team 1	Agg.	Team 2	1st leg	2nd leg
Misagh Tehran	(w/o)	Tasisat Daryaei	-	-
Shahrdari Tabriz	7 - 7 (a)	Mahan Tandis Qom	5-3	2-4

==== 1st leg ====
16 May 2014	Misagh Tehran	(w/o)	Tasisat Daryaei	Tehran
18:00				Stadium: Shahrdari Mantagheh 11 Arena

16 May 2014	Shahrdari Tabriz	5 – 3	Mahan Tandis Qom	Tabriz
18:00	M. Jaberi (2); M. Ezzati; B. Nassiri; V. Shafiei		M. Kermani; M. Kouhestani; S. Ghasemi	Stadium: Shahid Pour Sharifi Arena

==== 2nd leg ====
22 May 2014	Tasisat Daryaei	(w/o)	Misagh Tehran	Tehran
18:00				Stadium: Shahid Dastgerdi Arena

22 May 2014	Mahan Tandis Qom	4 – 2	Shahrdari Tabriz	Qom
18:00	M. Kermani 13'; A. Vafaei 19'; A. Ebrahimbeigi 29'; M. Vazirzadeh 39' (pen.)		B. Nassiri 22'; V. Shafiei 37'	Stadium: Shahid Heidarian Arena

=== Final ===
27 May 2014	Misagh Tehran	3 – 3 (a.e.t.) (1 - 4 p)	Mahan Tandis Qom	Tehran
17:00	M. Raeisi; M. Hassandoust; M. Farahmand		A. Orouji; A. Vafaei; M. Oladghobad	Stadium: Handball Arena
	Penalties
	M. Hassannejad (penalty missed); H. Soltani (penalty missed); M. Farahmand (penalty scored)		(penalty scored) Masoud Daneshvar; (penalty scored) M. Kermani; (penalty scored) M. Kouhestani; (penalty scored) S. Ghasemi

== Awards ==
Iranian Futsal Hazfi Cup
2013–14 champion

First title

- Winner: Mahan Tandis Qom
- Runners-up: Misagh Tehran

== Bracket ==
1/16 Final
H	Cut Shahrud	(w/o)
A	Rah Sari
H	Farsh Ara Mashhad	(w/o)
A	Naft Omidiyeh
H	Shahrdari Tabriz	3
A	Ferdosi Mashhad	1
H	Dabiri Tabriz	(w/o)
A	Iran Jahan Mashhad
H	Shahin Kermanshah	(w/o)
A	Melli Haffari Iran
H	Mahan Tandis Qom	4
A	Persepolis Behzisti	2
H	Nezam Mohandesi	4*
A	Shahrdari Saveh	3
Shahin Kuhdasht	Bay
Shahin Lordegan	Bay
H	Moghavemat Ilam	(w/o)
A	Zam Zam Isfahan
H	Shahid Faraji Qazvin	3
A	Misagh Tehran	6
H	Amaliyat Qeyr Sanati
A	Borna Khozestan	(w/o)
H	Giti Pasand Isfahan	(w/o)
A	Azarakhsh
H	Pas Qavamin Tehran	(w/o)
A	Hilal Ahmar Tabriz
H	Ali Sadr Hamedan	(w/o)
A	Shahid Mansouri
H	Tasisat Daryaei	6
A	Payam Valiasr Arak	1

1/8 Final
A	Cut Shahrud
H	Farsh Ara Mashhad	(w/o)
H	Shahrdari Tabriz	(w/o)
A	Dabiri Tabriz
H	Shahin Kermanshah	2
A	Mahan Tandis Qom	7
H	Nezam Mohandesi	9
A	Shahin Kuhdasht	4
H	Shahin Lordegan	3
A	Moghavemat Ilam	5
H	Misagh Tehran	4
A	Borna Khozestan	3
H	Giti Pasand Isfahan
A	Pas Qavamin Tehran	(w/o)
A	Ali Sadr Hamedan	2
H	Tasisat Daryaei	3

Quarter-finals
H	Farsh Ara Mashhad	3
A	Shahrdari Tabriz	4*
H	Mahan Tandis Qom	7
A	Nezam Mohandesi	0
A	Moghavemat Ilam	3
H	Misagh Tehran	6
H	Pas Qavamin Tehran	1
A	Tasisat Daryaei	5

Semifinals
H/A	Shahrdari Tabriz	5	2
A/H	Mahan Tandis Qom	3	4(a)
Misagh Tehran	(w/o)	(w/o)
Tasisat Daryaei

Final
H	Misagh Tehran	3/(1)
A	Mahan Tandis Qom	3/(4)

* after extra time

== See also ==
- 2013–14 Iranian Futsal Super League
- 2013–14 Futsal 1st Division
- 2014 Iran Futsal's 2nd Division
- 2013–14 Persian Gulf Cup
- 2013–14 Azadegan League
- 2013–14 Iran Football's 2nd Division
- 2013–14 Iran Football's 3rd Division
- 2013–14 Hazfi Cup
- Iranian Super Cup
