= Saeid Ghalandari =

Iranian futsal player

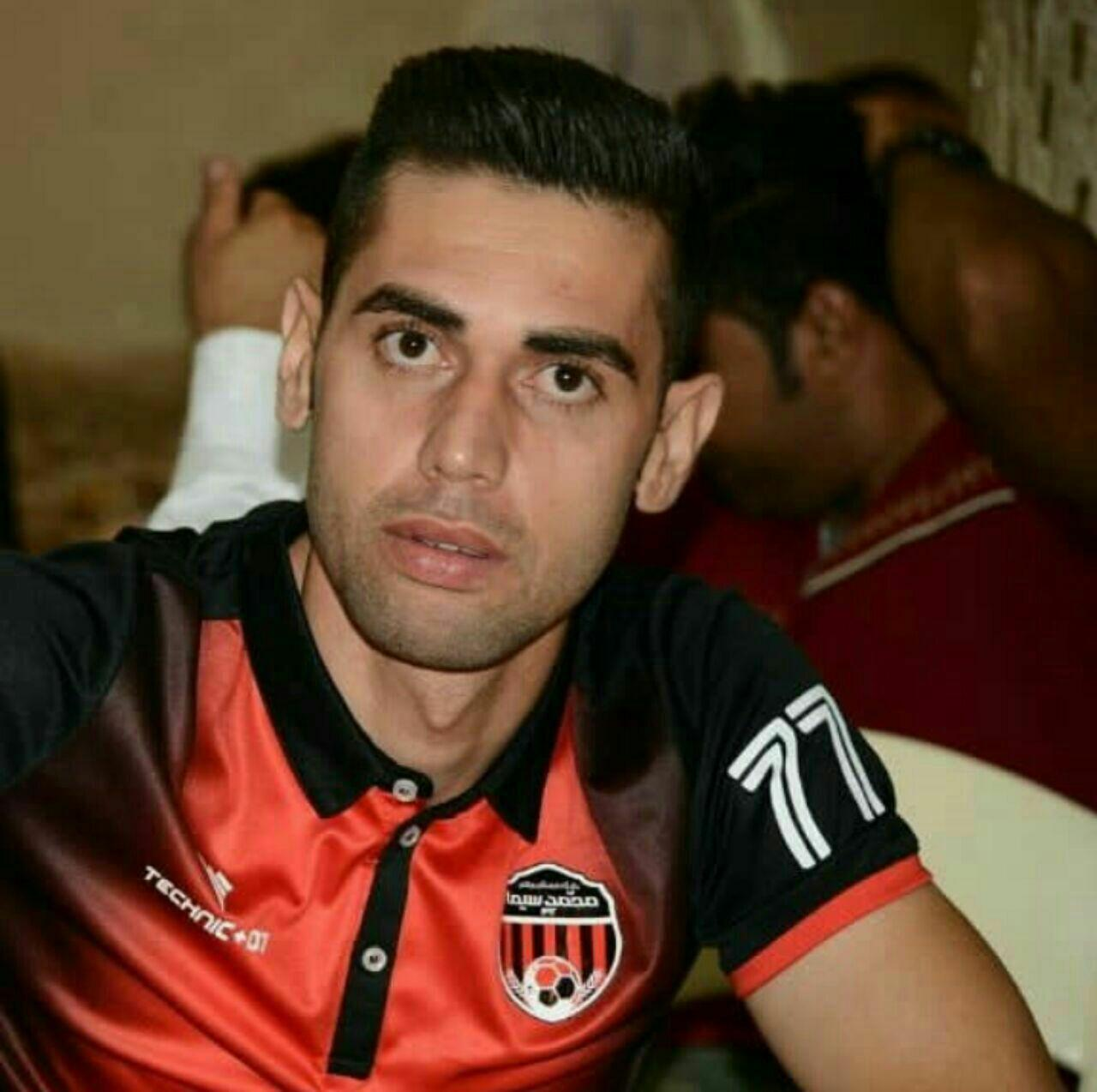
- Ghalandari with Ana Sanat in 2018

Personal information
- Full name: Saeid Ghalandari
- Date of birth: 17 February 1990 (age 36)
- Place of birth: Qom, Iran
- Position: Winger

Senior career*
Years	Team	Apps	(Gls)
–2014	Farid Qom		
2014–2018	Ana Sanat		
2018–2019	Moghavemat Qarchak		(1)
2019–2020	Ana Sanat		(7)
2020–2021	Shahid Mansouri		(2)
2021	Shahrdari Saveh		(3)
2021–2023	Ana Sanat		(8)
- * Club domestic league appearances and goals as of 11 August 2023

Saeid Ghalandari (Persian: سعید قلندری; born 17 February 1990) is an Iranian professional futsal player.

== Club career ==
=== Ferdows ===
He scored his first goal in the Iranian Futsal Super League in a 4–2 win over Farsh Ara.

== Honours ==
- Iran Futsal's 1st Division
  - Runners-up (1): 2016–17 (Ana Sanat)
