= Mohammad Dehghan (futsal player) =

Iranian futsal player

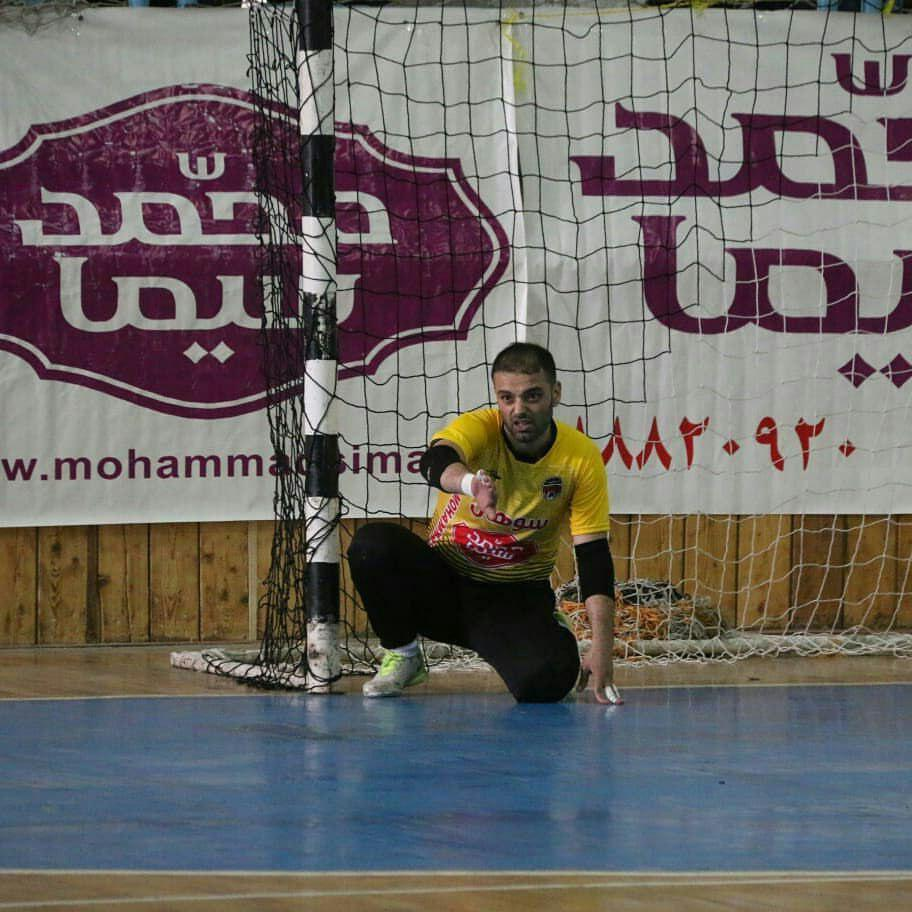
- Dehghan with Ana Sanat in 2019

Personal information
- Full name: Mohammad Reza Dehghani Fordoei
- Date of birth: 23 July 1988 (age 38)
- Place of birth: Fordo, Iran
- Position: Goalkeeper

Team information
- Current team: Ana Sanat (goalkeeping coach)

Youth career
- 2005–2006: Miladi Qom (football)
- 2006–2007: Eram Kish

Senior career*
Years	Team	Apps	(Gls)
2007–2010	Eram Kish		
2010–2011	Kish Air		
2011–2013	Saba		(0)
2013–2014	Mahan Tandis		(0)
2014–2015	Shahid Mansouri		(0)
2015–2020	Ana Sanat		

International career^{‡}
- Iran U20
- Iran U23

Managerial career
- 2022–: Ana Sanat (goalkeeping coach)
- * Club domestic league appearances and goals as of 20 October 2022 ‡ National team caps and goals as of 16 October 2020

Mohammad Dehghan (Persian: محمد دهقان; born 23 July 1988) is an Iranian professional futsal coach and former player. He is currently goalkeeping coach of Ana Sanat in the Iranian Futsal Super League.

== Honours ==
=== Club ===
- Iranian Futsal Super League
  - Runners-up (2): 2008–09 (Eram Kish) - 2012–13 (Saba)
- Iranian Futsal Hazfi Cup
  - Champion (1): 2013–14 (Mahan Tandis)
- Iran Futsal's 1st Division
  - Runners-up (1): 2016–17 (Ana Sanat)
