= Ali Ebrahimbeigi =

Iranian futsal player

Personal information
- Full name: Ali Ebrahimbeigi
- Date of birth: 19 May 1984 (age 42)
- Place of birth: Qom, Iran

Youth career
- Persepolis Qom (football)

Senior career*
Years	Team	Apps	(Gls)
2006–2007	Daneshgah Oloum Pezezhki		
2007–2010	Eram Kish		
2010–2011	Kish Air		
2011–2012	Saba		(7)
2012–2013	Dabiri		(2)
2013–2014	Mahan Tandis		(2)
2014–2015	Ana Sanat		
2015–2016	Sunich		
2016–2018	Ana Sanat		(8)
2018–2019	Farsh Asayesh Aran o Bidgol		
2020–2021	Delsoukhtegan Ahlebeit Qom		
- * Club domestic league appearances and goals as of 11 September 2022

Ali Ebrahimbeigi (Persian: علی ابراهیم بیگی; born 19 May 1984) is an Iranian professional futsal player.

== Honours ==
=== Club ===
- Iranian Futsal Super League
  - Runners-up (1): 2008–09 (Eram Kish)
- Iranian Futsal Hazfi Cup
  - Champion (1): 2013–14 (Mahan Tandis)
- Iran Futsal's 1st Division
  - Runners-up (1): 2016–17 (Ana Sanat)
