= Moslem Oladghobad =

Iranian futsal player

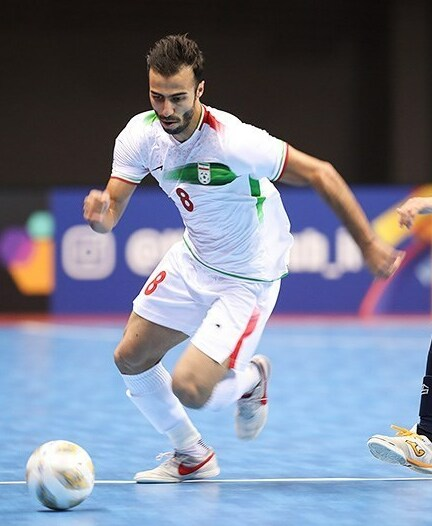
- Oladghobad with Iran in 2022

Personal information
- Full name: Moslem Oladghobad
- Date of birth: 29 November 1995 (age 30)
- Place of birth: Kuhdasht, Iran
- Height: 1.83 m (6 ft 0 in)
- Position: Right flank

Team information
- Current team: Palma
- Number: 13

Youth career
- –2012: Dehyaran
- 2012–2013: Shahin Javan
- 2013–2015: Mahan Tandis

Senior career*
Years	Team	Apps	(Gls)
2012–2013	Shahin Javan		
2013–2015	Mahan Tandis		(13)
2015–2016	Yasin Pishro		(5)
2016–2017	Shahrdari Saveh		(11)
2017–2018	Tasisat Daryaei		(9)
2018–2019	Giti Pasand		(7)
2019–2021	Mes Sungun		(12)
2021–2022	Crop		(13)
2022–	Palma	4	(2)

International career^{‡}
- Iran U20
- Iran U23
2017–	Iran		(11)
Medal record
Representing Iran
Men's Futsal as player
AFC Futsal Championship
Gold medal – first place	2018 Chinese Taipei
Gold medal – first place	2024 Thailand
Silver medal – second place	2022 Kuwait
AFC Futsal Asian Cup
Gold medal – first place	2026 Indonesia
Asian Indoor and Martial Arts Games
Gold medal – first place	2017 Ashgabat
- * Club domestic league appearances and goals as of 25 April 2023 ‡ National team caps and goals as of 18 September 2022

Moslem Oladghobad (Persian: مسلم اولادقباد; born 29 November 1995) is an Iranian professional futsal player. He is currently a member of Palma in the Primera División de Futsal.

== International goals ==
No.	Date	Venue	Opponent	Score	Result	Competition
1.	23 September 2017	Ashgabat, Turkmenistan	Thailand	10–2	10–4	2017 Asian Indoor and Martial Arts Games
2.	24 January 2018	Baku, Azerbaijan	Azerbaijan	3–1	4–1	Friendly
3.	2 February 2018	Taipei, Taiwan	Myanmar	13–0	14–0	2018 AFC Futsal Championship
4.	6 February 2018	Taipei, Taiwan	Iraq	3–1	5–3	2018 AFC Futsal Championship
5.	26 September 2018	Tabriz, Iran	Ukraine	1–1	2–1	Friendly
6.	11 September 2022	Bangkok, Thailand	Finland	2–1	2–1	Friendly
7.	28 September 2022	Kuwait City, Kuwait	Indonesia	2–0	5–0	2022 AFC Futsal Asian Cup
8.	2 October 2022	Kuwait City, Kuwait	Lebanon	4–0	9–0	2022 AFC Futsal Asian Cup
9.	4 October 2022	Kuwait City, Kuwait	Vietnam	5–0	8–1	2022 AFC Futsal Asian Cup
10.	6 October 2022	Kuwait City, Kuwait	Thailand	3–0	5–0	2022 AFC Futsal Asian Cup
11.	6 October 2022	Kuwait City, Kuwait	Thailand	4–0	5–0	2022 AFC Futsal Asian Cup

== Honours ==
=== International ===
- AFC Futsal Championship
  - Champion (2): 2018, 2024
  - Runner-up (1): 2022
- Asian Indoor and Martial Arts Games
  - Champion (1): 2017

=== Club ===
- UEFA Futsal Champions League
  - champion: 2022–23, 2023-24 (AE Palma futsal)
- Iranian Futsal Super League
  - Champion (1): 2019–20 (Mes Sungun)
  - Runners-up (2): 2017–18 (Tasisat Daryaei) - 2018–19 (Giti Pasand)
- Iranian Futsal Hazfi Cup
  - Champion (1): 2013–14 (Mahan Tandis)

=== Individual ===
- AFC Futsaler of the Year: 2022
