= Meysam Ilanlou =

Iranian futsal player

Personal information
- Full name: Meysam Ilanlou
- Date of birth: 1989 (age 36–37)
- Place of birth: Qom, Iran

Team information
- Current team: Mes Sarcheshmeh
- Number: 3

Youth career
- 2007–2008: Eram Kish

Senior career*
Years	Team	Apps	(Gls)
2007–2008	Eram Kish		
2008–2009	Faraz Qom		
2009–2010	Heyat Roustaei va Ashayeri Qom		
2010–2011	Shahrdari Saveh		
2011–2012	Bonyad Maskan Shiraz		
2012–2013	Saba		(11)
2013–2014	Dabiri		(8)
2014	Mahan Tandis		(2)
2014–2015	Shahid Mansouri		(0)
2015–2017	Yasin Pishro		(9)
2017–2018	Ana Sanat		(2)
2018–2019	Farsh Ara		(4)
2019	Labaniyat Arjan		(5)
2019–2020	Melli Haffari		(0)
2021–	Mes Sarcheshmeh		(0)
- * Club domestic league appearances and goals as of 11 September 2022

Meysam Ilanlou (Persian: میثم ایلانلو) is an Iranian professional futsal player. He is currently a member of Mes Sarcheshmeh in the Iran Futsal's 1st Division.

== Honours ==
=== Club ===
- Iranian Futsal Super League
  - Champion (1): 2013–14 (Dabiri)
  - Runners-up (1): 2012–13 (Saba)
