= Abolghasem Orouji =

Iranian futsal player

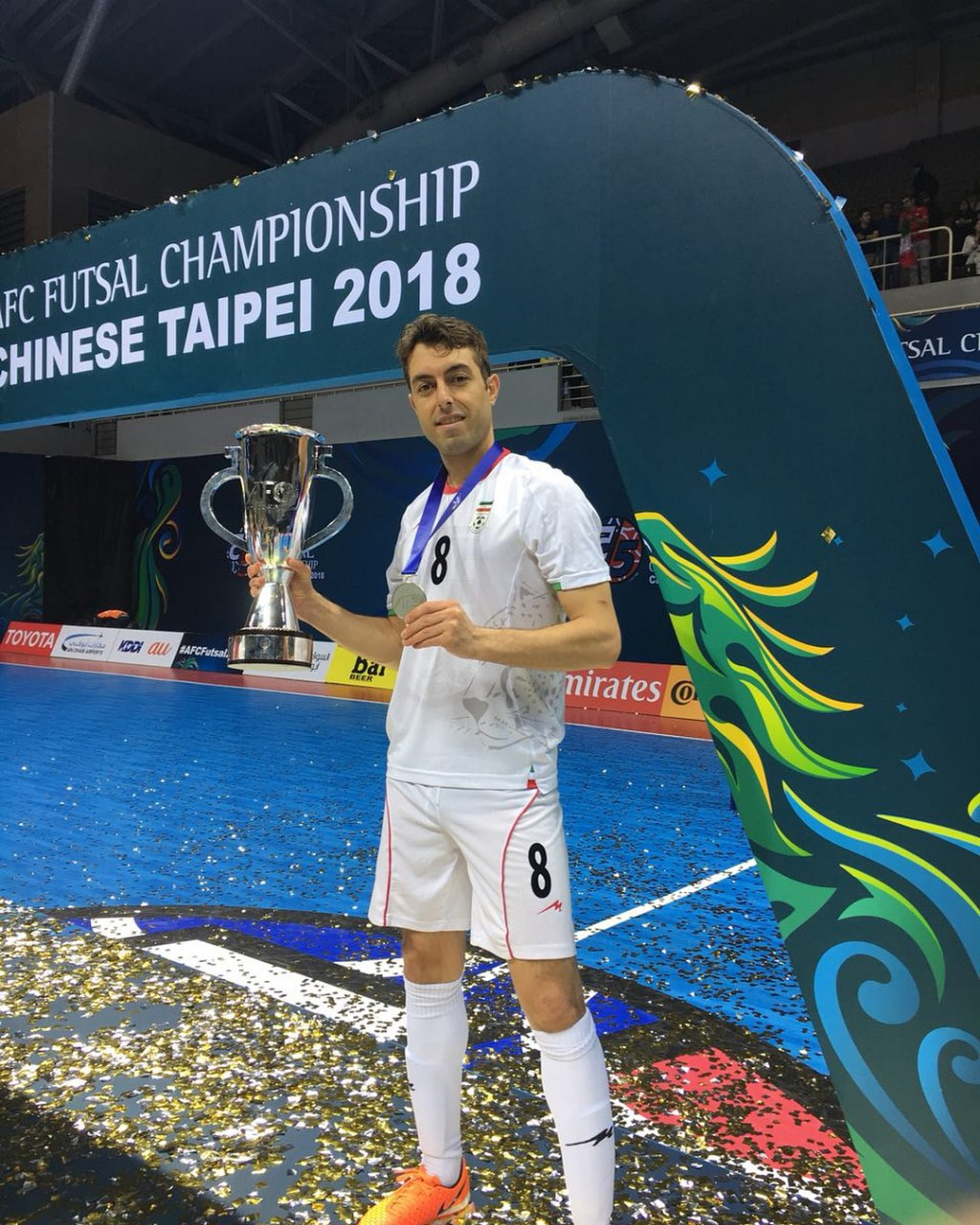
- Orouji with Iran in 2018

Personal information
- Full name: Abolghasem Orouji
- Date of birth: 2 December 1989 (age 36)
- Place of birth: Qom, Iran
- Height: 1.76 m (5 ft 9 in)
- Position: Right winger

Team information
- Current team: Ana Sanat
- Number: 10

Youth career
- –2009: Shahid Raeis Karami
- 2009–2010: Eram Kish

Senior career*
Years	Team	Apps	(Gls)
2009–2010	Eram Kish		
2010–2012	Faraz		
2012–2013	Saba		(9)
2013–2015	Mahan Tandis		(20)
2015–2017	Tasisat Daryaei		(13)
2017–2018	Giti Pasand		(9)
2018–2019	Mes Sungun		(18)
2019	→ Sipar Khujand (loan)		
2021–2022	Mes Sungun		(7)
2022–2023	Giti Pasand		(4)
2023	Thái Sơn Nam		
2023–	Ana Sanat	6	(4)

International career^{‡}
2013–2019	Iran		(15)
- * Club domestic league appearances and goals as of 7 September 2023 ‡ National team caps and goals as of 3 June 2020

Abolghasem Orouji (Persian: ابوالقاسم عروجی; born 2 December 1989) is an Iranian professional futsal player. He is currently a member of Ana Sanat in the Iranian Futsal Super League.

== Honours ==
=== Country ===
- AFC Futsal Championship
  - Champion (1): 2018
- Asian Indoor and Martial Arts Games
  - Champion (1): 2017

=== Club ===
- AFC Futsal Club Championship
  - Champion (2): 2015 (Tasisat Daryaei), 2018 (Mes Sungun)
  - Runner-Up (2): 2017 (Giti Pasand), 2019 (Mes Sungun)
- Iranian Futsal Super League
  - Champion (2): 2015–16 (Tasisat Daryaei), 2018–19 (Mes Sungun)
  - Runners-up (2): 2012–13 (Saba), 2017–18 (Tasisat Daryaei)
- Iranian Futsal Hazfi Cup
  - Champion (1): 2013–14 (Mahan Tandis)
