= Mojtaba Nassirnia =

Iranian futsal player (born 1985)

Personal information
- Full name: Mojtaba Nassirnia Farouji
- Date of birth: 9 September 1985 (age 41)
- Place of birth: Tehran, Iran
- Height: 1.76 m (5 ft 9 in)
- Position: Goalkeeper

Team information
- Current team: Safir Gofteman
- Number: 2

Youth career
- Moghavemat Qarchak (Football)
- Kowsar Tehran (Football)

Senior career*
Years	Team	Apps	(Gls)
2003–2004	Shahrdari Qarchak		
2004–2014	Shahid Mansouri		(2)
AFCC 2013	→ Giti Pasand (loan)	5	(0)
2014–2015	Ferdosi Mashhad		(0)
2015–2016	Shahid Mansouri		(0)
2016–2017	Yasin Pishro		(0)
2017–2019	Moghavemat Qarchak		(0)
2019–2020	Setaregan		(0)
2020–2021	Raga		(0)
2021–2022	Shahrdari Saveh		(0)
2022–	Safir Gofteman		(0)

International career^{‡}
2003–2006	Iran U21		
2009–	Iran	62	
- * Club domestic league appearances and goals as of 30 October 2022 ‡ National team caps and goals as of 7 September 2019

Mojtaba Nassirnia Farouji (Persian: ﻣﺠﺘﺒﯽ ﻧﺼﯿﺮﻧﯿﺎ ﻓﺎﺭﻭﺟﯽ; born 9 September 1985) is an Iranian professional futsal player. He is currently a member of Safir Gofteman in the Iranian Futsal Super League.

== Honours ==
=== Country ===
- AFC Futsal Championship
  - Champion (1): 2010
- Asian Indoor and Martial Arts Games
  - Champion (1): 2009
- WAFF Futsal Championship
  - Champion (1): 2012

=== Club ===
- AFC Futsal Club Championship
  - Runner-Up (2): 2011 (Shahid Mansouri) - 2013 (Giti Pasand)
- Iranian Futsal Super League
  - Champion (2): 2010–11 (Shahid Mansouri) - 2011–12 (Shahid Mansouri)
  - Runner-Up (2): 2007–08 (Shahid Mansouri) - 2009–10 (Shahid Mansouri)
