= Mohammad Beyzaeinejad =

Iranian futsal player

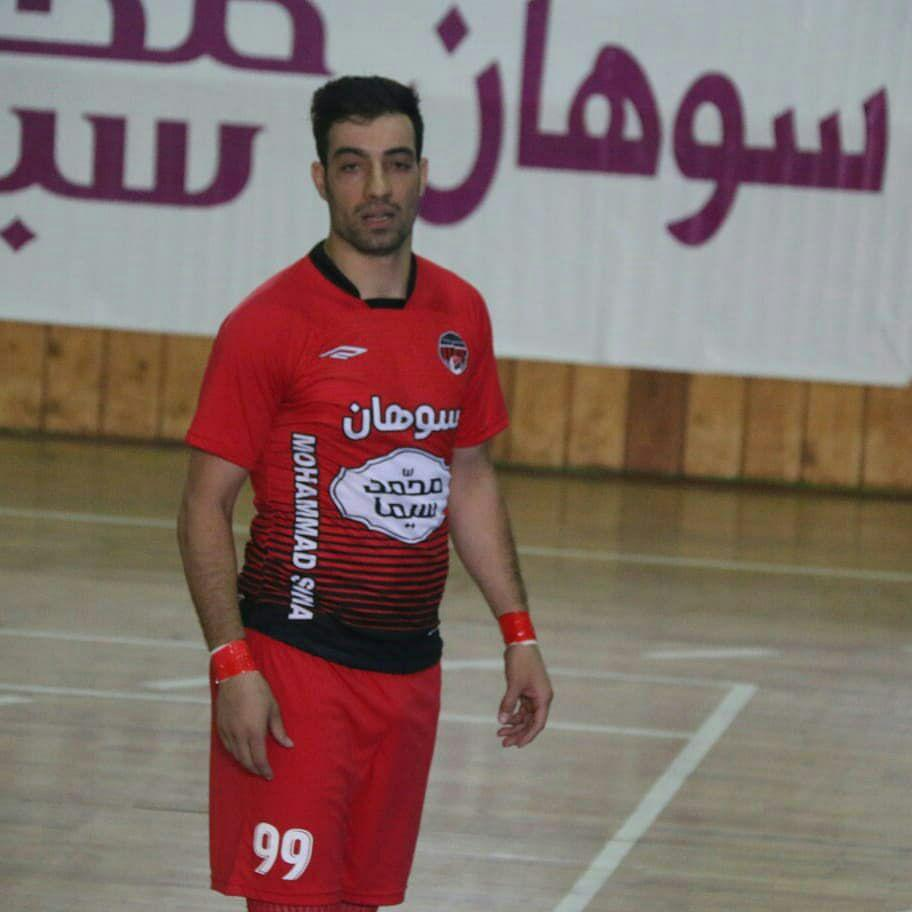
- Beyzaeinejad with Ferdows in 2019

Personal information
- Full name: Mohammad Beyzaeinejad
- Date of birth: 21 November 1988 (age 37)
- Place of birth: Shiraz, Iran
- Height: 1.87 m (6 ft 2 in)
- Position: Pivot

Team information
- Current team: Gohar Zamin
- Number: 9

Youth career
- 2006–2008: Moghavemat Shiraz

Senior career*
Years	Team	Apps	(Gls)
2008–2013	Labaniyat Arjan		
2013	Misagh		(2)
2014	Tasisat Daryaei		(4)
2014–2015	Shahrdari Saveh		(7)
2015–2018	Labaniyat Arjan		(48)
2018	Neftçi Baku		
2018–2019	Parsian		(11)
2019	Ana Sanat		(5)
2019–2020	Labaniyat Arjan		(15)
2020–2021	Farsh Ara		(1)
2021–	Gohar Zamin		

International career^{‡}
2008–2011	Iran U23		
2012	Iran		
- * Club domestic league appearances and goals as of 11 September 2022 ‡ National team caps and goals as of 3 January 2021

Mohammad Beyzaeinejad (Persian: محمد بیضایی‌نژاد; born 21 November 1988) is an Iranian professional futsal player. He is currently a member of Gohar Zamin in the Iranian Futsal Super League.

== Honours ==
=== Club ===
- Iran Futsal's 1st Division
  - Champion (1): 2015–16 (Labaniyat Arjan)
