= Ali Rahnama (futsal player) =

Iranian futsal player (born 1985)

Personal information
- Full name: Ali Rahnama
- Date of birth: 21 May 1985 (age 41)
- Place of birth: Behshahr, Iran
- Height: 1.78 m (5 ft 10 in)
- Position: Pivot

Team information
- Current team: Safir Gofteman
- Number: 9

Youth career
- –2002: Sardar Kimiya

Senior career*
| Years | Team | Apps | (Gls) |
| 2002–2003 | Saipa Behshahr | | |
| 2003–2005 | Shohada Rostamkola | | |
| 2005–2006 | Saipa Behshahr | | |
| 2006–2007 | Moghavemat Mazandaran | | |
| 2007 | Fajr Ghaem Galugah | | |
| 2007–2008 | Saveh Shen | | |
| 2008–2009 | Eram Kish | | |
| 2009–2014 | Shahid Mansouri | | |
| 2014–2015 | Misagh | | (0) |
| 2015–2016 | Shahrvand Novin Surak | | |
| 2016–2017 | Shahrdari Saveh | | (7) |
| 2017–2018 | Moghavemat Qarchak | | (12) |
| 2018–2019 | Shahrvand | | (3) |
| 2019–2020 | Setaregan | | (12) |
| 2020–2021 | Shahid Mansouri | | (2) |
| 2021–2022 | Shahrdari Saveh | | (7) |
| 2022– | Safir Gofteman | | (0) |

International career^{‡}
| 2008 | Iran U23 | | |
| 2008– | Iran | | (2) |
- * Club domestic league appearances and goals as of 30 October 2022 ‡ National team caps and goals as of 28 April 2021

Ali Rahnama (Persian: علی رهنما; born 21 May 1985) is an Iranian professional futsal player. He is currently a member of Safir Gofteman in the Iranian Futsal Super League.

== Honours ==
=== Country ===
- AFC Futsal Championship
  - Champion (1): 2010
- Confederations Cup
  - Champion (1): 2009

=== Club ===
- AFC Futsal Club Championship
  - Runners-up (1): 2011 (Shahid Mansouri)
- Iranian Futsal Super League
  - Champion (2): 2010–11 (Shahid Mansouri) - 2011–12 (Shahid Mansouri)
  - Runners-up (2): 2008–09 (Eram Kish) - 2009–10 (Shahid Mansouri)
- Iran Futsal's 2nd Division
  - Champion (1): 2007 (Saveh Shen)

== International goals ==
| # | Date | Venue | Opponent | Score | Result | Competition |
|---|---|---|---|---|---|---|
| 1 | 24 May 2010 | Uzbekistan Sports Complex, Tashkent | Australia | 3-9 | 3–9 | 2010 AFC Futsal Championship |
| 2 | 11 November 2012 | (Thailand) Nimibutr Indoor, Bangkok | Colombia | 1–2 | 1–2 | 2012 FIFA Futsal World Cup |
