= Alê Falcone =

Brazilian futsal player (born 1990)

Personal information
- Full name: Alexey Fernandes Falcone
- Date of birth: 3 August 1990 (age 36)
- Place of birth: São Bernardo do Campo، Brazil
- Height: 1.73 m (5 ft 8 in)
- Position: Goalkeeper

Team information
- Current team: Associação de Futsal de Umuarama
- Number: 90

Senior career*
| Years | Team | Apps | (Gls) |
| 2007–2009 | Augusta 1986 | | |
| 2010–2014 | Palmeiras | | |
| 2014–2015 | Guarapuava | | |
| 2015–2017 | Carlos Barbosa | | |
| 2017–2018 | Copagril | 1 | (0) |
| 2018–2019 | Cascavel | 43 | (2) |
| 2018 | → Unidos Pinheirense (loan) | 5 | (0) |
| 2019–2020 | Giti Pasand | | (1) |
- * Club domestic league appearances and goals

Alexey Fernandes Falcone (born 3 August 1990) is a Brazilian futsal player. He plays as a goalkeeper for Giti Pasand. People usually call him (Alê Falcone).

He started futsal in August 1986, then he played for some Brazilian clubs such as Carlos Barbosa and Palmeiras. He joined Giti Pasand in September 2018. He made his debut against Hyper Shahr Shahin Shahr on 31 October 2018. He caught a penalty in that match.

== Honours ==
Winner the Liga Nacional de Futsal with Carlos Barbosa in 2015. Winner the Liga Nacional de Futsal with Atlântico de Erechim in 2023.
