= 2018–19 Iranian Futsal Super League =

Iranian Futsal Super League
- Season: 2018–19
- Champions: Mes Sungun
- Relegated: Parsian; Shahrdari
- Matches: 197
- Goals: 1,150 (5.84 per match)
- Top goalscorer: Mahdi Javid (37 goals)
- Biggest home win: Giti Pasand 6 – 0 Shahrdari; Shahrvand 7 – 1 Sohan Mohammad Sima
- Biggest away win: Shahrdari 2 – 8 Parsian
- Highest scoring: Sohan Mohammad Sima 7 – 5 Ahoora

The 2018–19 Iranian Futsal Super League are the 20th season of the Iran Pro League and the 15th under the name Futsal Super League. Mes Sungun are the defending champions. The season will feature 12 teams from the 2017–18 Super League and two new teams promoted from the 2017–18 1st Division: Sunich and Ahoora.

== Teams ==
=== Stadia, locations and Personnel ===
Locations of clubs in 2018–19 Iranian Futsal Super League

Team	City	Venue	Capacity	Head coach	Team captain	Past Season
Ahoora	Behbahan	Ali ibn Abi Talib	1,000	(Iran) Mohammad Hojjat	(Iran) Amir Shojaei	Promoted
Azarakhsh	Sarkhun	Fajr	4,000	(Iran) Abbas Rouzpeikar	(Iran) Mohammad Baniasadi	7th
Farsh Ara	Mashhad	Shahid Beheshti	6,000	(Iran) Mohsen Hassanzadeh	(Iran) Abdolrahman Sarani	6th
Giti Pasand	Isfahan	Pirouzi	4,300	(Iran) Reza Lak Aliabadi	(Iran) Mohammad Keshavarz	3rd
Labaniyat Arjan	Shiraz	Shahid Abolfathi	–	(Iran) Hamid Reza Kamali	–	12th
Melli Haffari	Ahvaz	Emam Reza	1,000	(Iran) Mohammad Reza Davoudinejad	(Iran) Fares Ziyagham	4th
Mes Sungun	Varzaqan	Shahid Pour Sharifi	6,000	(Iran) Esmaeil Taghipour	(Iran) Farhad Fakhimzadeh	Champion
Moghavemat	Karaj	Enghelab Eslami	2,500	(Iran) Farhad Keshavarz	–	11th
Moghavemat	Qarchak	Shohadaye 7th Tir	3,000	(Iran) Reza Zarkhanli	(Iran) Mostafa Zarifian	8th
Parsian	Shahr-e Qods	Al Ghadir	1,000	(Iran) Esmaeil Taheri	–	Replaced for Tasisat Daryaei
Shahrdari	Saveh	Fajr-e Felestin	2,500	(Iran) Reza Fallahzadeh	–	10th
Shahrvand	Sari	Sayed Rasoul Hosseini	5,000	(Iran) Mohammad Ali Esmaeilpour	(Iran) Morteza Azimaei	9th
Sohan Mohammad Sima	Qom	Shahid Heidarian	2,000	(Iran) Hossein Sabouri	(Iran) Hashem Farajzadeh	5th
Sunich	Saveh	Fajr-e Felestin	2,500	(Iran) Javad Asghari Moghaddam	–	Promoted

=== Number of teams by region ===
	Region	Number of teams	Teams
1	Tehran	2	Moghavemat Qarchak, Parsian
2	Khuzestan	2	Melli Haffari, Ahoora
3	Markazi	2	Shahrdari, Sunich
4	Qom	1	Sohan Mohammad Sima
5	Alborz	1	Moghavemat Alborz
6	Mazandaran	1	Shahrvand
7	East Azerbaijan	1	Mes Sungun
8	Isfahan	1	Giti Pasand
9	Hormozgan	1	Azarakhsh
10	Razavi Khorasan	1	Farsh Ara
11	Fars	1	Labaniyat Arjan

== League standings ==
Pos	Team	Pld	W	D	L	GF	GA	GD	Pts	Qualification or relegation
1	Giti Pasand	26	22	1	3	111	58	+53	67	Qualification for the Championship playoffs
2	Mes Sungun	26	16	7	3	96	61	+35	55	Qualification for the Championship playoffs
3	Farsh Ara	26	15	2	9	79	63	+16	47	Qualification for the Championship playoffs
4	Melli Haffari	26	12	8	6	74	65	+9	44	Qualification for the Championship playoffs
5	Sunich	26	12	5	9	73	67	+6	41	Qualification for the Championship playoffs
6	Sohan Mohammad Sima	26	11	7	8	69	74	−5	40	Qualification for the Championship playoffs
7	Shahrvand	26	11	6	9	87	78	+9	39	Qualification for the Championship playoffs
8	Moghavemat Alborz	26	9	6	11	66	71	−5	33	Qualification for the Championship playoffs
9	Azarakhsh	26	8	5	13	73	86	−13	29	
10	Labaniyat Arjan	26	7	6	13	59	60	−1	27	
11	Moghavemat Qarchak	26	6	8	12	55	71	−16	26	
12	Ahoora	26	6	5	15	75	108	−33	23	
13	Parsian (R)	26	6	4	16	82	93	−11	22	Relegation to the 1st Division
14	Shahrdari (R)	26	3	6	17	63	107	−44	15	Relegation to the 1st Division

Updated to match(es) played on 13 March 2022. Source: Fut5al.ir
Rules for classification: 1) Points; 2) Goal difference; 3) Goals scored.
(R) Relegated

== Positions by round ==
Team ╲ Round	1	2	3	4	5	6	7	8	9	10	11	12	13	14	15	16	17	18	19	20	21	22	23	24	25	26
Giti Pasand	7	5	1	1	1	1	1	1	1	1	1	1	1	1	1	1	1	1	1	1	1	1	1	1	1	1
Mes Sungun	6	4	4	3	6	9	5	5	2	2	3	2	2	2	2	2	2	2	2	2	2	2	2	2	2	2
Farsh Ara	1	1	2	4	7	5	7	8	8	6	5	6	4	4	3	4	3	3	3	3	3	4	3	3	3	3
Melli Haffari	2	2	3	2	3	4	3	2	4	7	4	5	7	6	4	3	4	4	6	4	5	5	4	4	4	4
Sunich	3	7	8	8	5	8	6	6	7	5	6	4	6	7	7	7	6	5	7	5	7	6	7	7	6	5
Sohan Mohammad Sima	4	3	6	6	4	2	4	3	6	4	7	7	5	5	6	6	7	7	5	7	4	3	5	5	5	6
Shahrvand	14	9	10	11	10	7	8	7	3	3	2	3	3	3	5	5	5	6	4	6	6	7	6	6	7	7
Moghavemat Alborz	8	11	11	9	9	6	9	9	9	9	9	9	8	8	8	8	8	9	10	8	8	8	8	8	8	8
Azarakhsh	5	8	5	7	8	10	10	11	10	10	10	10	10	9	9	11	9	8	8	9	9	9	9	9	9	9
Labaniyat Arjan	9	10	7	5	2	3	2	4	5	8	8	8	9	10	10	9	10	10	9	10	10	10	10	10	10	10
Moghavemat Qarchak	12	12	12	13	13	11	12	10	11	11	12	11	11	11	11	10	11	11	11	11	11	11	11	11	11	11
Ahoora	13	13	13	14	14	14	14	14	14	14	14	14	14	14	14	14	14	13	13	13	13	13	13	12	13	12
Parsian	10	6	9	10	11	12	11	12	12	12	11	12	12	12	12	12	12	12	12	12	12	12	12	13	12	13
Shahrdari	11	14	14	12	12	13	13	13	13	13	13	13	13	13	13	13	13	14	14	14	14	14	14	14	14	14

Leader / AFC Futsal Club Championship
Relegation to the 1st Division

Updated to match(es) played on 15 January 2022. Source:

== Results table ==
Home \ Away	AHO	ARJ	AZA	ARA	SGP	HFR	MES	MOA	MOQ	PAR	SHS	SAR	SMS	SUN
Ahoora		3–1	3–2	5–6	2–7	4–3	3–3	3–8	2–2	5–4	4–4	3–4	2–2	2–2
Labaniyat Arjan	5–1		1–3	2–3	1–2	5–0	1–1	5–0	3–3	5–4	2–2	0–0	1–3	1–2
Azarakhsh	3–1	4–3		1–3	4–7	2–2	3–3	1–1	3–1	3–1	2–2	5–3	1–2	8–6
Farsh Ara	3–1	3–1	1–0		1–4	3–3	3–5	5–3	0–1	3–2	8–3	6–2	1–2	4–1
Giti Pasand	8–3	6–2	5–4	5–2		7–4	5–4	2–1	6–3	8–3	6–0	0–3 (Note: The game score was 0–2.)	4–1	4–2
Melli Haffari	3–2	1–1	2–0	3–3	2–3		3–3	2–1	3–1	3–2	3–1	3–1	7–2	3–2
Mes Sungun	4–0	2–1	6–4	1–5	4–3	4–0		6–1	5–3	7–2	3–0	3–2	7–2	1–1
Moghavemat Alborz	3–1	3–1	3–4	2–1	3–4	2–1	4–2		1–1	4–1	6–3	1–3	2–2	1–0
Moghavemat Qarchak	3–4	2–2	1–1	2–0	0–3	2–5	1–5	5–1		2–1	2–2	4–3	1–1	4–5
Parsian	8–3	2–6	7–5	2–3	0–1	3–3	2–3	4–3	3–1		3–3	2–4	2–3	6–2
Shahrdari	5–9	3–4	5–3	2–4	2–3	3–3	3–4	5–3	2–1	2–8		1–4	0–2	1–4
Shahrvand	5–4	1–2	4–2	2–4	3–2	4–4	3–3	6–6	4–4	6–6	5–2		7–1	3–2
Sohan Mohammad Sima	7–5	3–2	6–1	5–3	2–2	1–2	5–6	2–2	3–4	2–2	5–4	3–2		0–0
Sunich	3–0	3–1	7–4	3–1	2–4	3–6	1–1	1–1	3–1	3–2	6–3	5–3	4–2	

Updated to match(es) played on 29 December 2021. Source: Fut5al
Legend: Blue = home team win; Yellow = draw; Red = away team win.

== Championship playoffs ==
=== Calendar ===
Round	Date	Fixtures	Clubs	Notes
Quarter-finals			8 → 4	Teams who win 2 games of 3 qualify to next round
Semifinals			4 → 2	
Final			2 → 1	

=== Bracket ===
Quarter-finals
1	Giti Pasand	6	6
8	Moghavemat Alborz	1	1
4	Melli Haffari	6	2	6
5	Sunich	3	3	3
2	Mes Sungun	6	6
7	Shahrvand	1	5
3	Farsh Ara	0	0
6	Sohan Mohammad Sima	1	2

Semifinals
1	Giti Pasand	2	5
4	Melli Haffari	3	0
2	Mes Sungun	4	3
6	Sohan Mohammad Sima	3	3

Final
1	Giti Pasand	0	3
2	Mes Sungun	0	5

== Awards ==
Iranian Futsal Super League
2018–19 champions
Mes Sungun
Second title

- Winner: Mes Sungun
- Runners-up: Giti Pasand
- Third-Place: Melli Haffari
- Top scorer: (Iran) Mahdi Javid (Giti Pasand) (37 goals)
- Best player:
- Best manager:
- Best goalkeeper:
- Best team:
- Fairplay man:
- Best referee:
