= Saeid Ghasemi =

Iranian futsal player

Personal information
- Full name: Saeid Ghasemi
- Date of birth: 10 December 1985 (age 40)
- Place of birth: Isfahan, Iran
- Position: Defender

Youth career
- 2001–2002: Persepolis Qom (football)
- 2002–2003: Hilal Ahmar Qom (football)

Senior career*
Years	Team	Apps	(Gls)
2003–2010	Eram Kish		
2010–2011	Kish Air		
2011–2013	Shahrdari Saveh		
2013–2015	Mahan Tandis		(17)
2015–2017	Yasin Pishro		(14)
2017–2018	Shahed Tehran		(1)
2018–2022	Ana Sanat		(5)

International career^{‡}
2005–2009	Iran U23		

Managerial career
- 2022: Ana Sanat (Player-coach)
- * Club domestic league appearances and goals as of 17 December 2022 ‡ National team caps and goals as of 3 January 2021

Saeid Ghasemi (Persian: سعید قاسمی; born 10 December 1985) is an Iranian professional futsal coach and former player.

== Honours ==
- Iranian Futsal Super League
  - Runners-up (1): 2008–09 (Eram Kish)
- Iranian Futsal Hazfi Cup
  - Champion (1): 2013–14 (Mahan Tandis)
