= Ana Sanat F.C. =

Iranian futsal club

Ana Sanat
- Full name: Ana Sanat Pasargad Futsal Club
- Founded: 2013; 12 years ago as Atoliyeh Tehran
- Ground: Shahid Jafar Heidarian Indoor Stadium, Qom
- Capacity: 2,000
- Owner: Majid Sherafati
- Chairman: Mohammad Sherafati
- Head coach: Hossein Sabouri
- League: Iranian Futsal Super League
- 2022–23: 11th of 14
Home colours	Away colours

Ana Sanat Pasargad Futsal Club (Persian: باشگاه فوتسال آنا صنعت پاسارگاد), commonly referred to as Ana Sanat, is an Iranian professional futsal club based in Qom.

== History ==
The club was founded in 2013 by Rasoul Gholizadeh as Atoliyeh Tehran. In recent years, due to the changes in sponsorship, it has had different names such as Ana Beton, Sohan Mohammad Sima and Ferdows Commercial Complex.

On September 5, 2022, the franchise of this club was officially handed over to Majid Sherafati, and its name was changed to Ana Sanat Pasargad.

== Crest ==
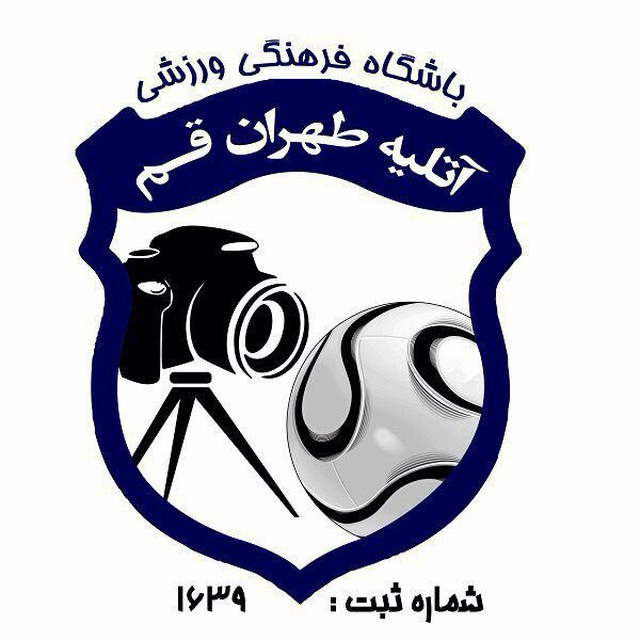
2013–2018

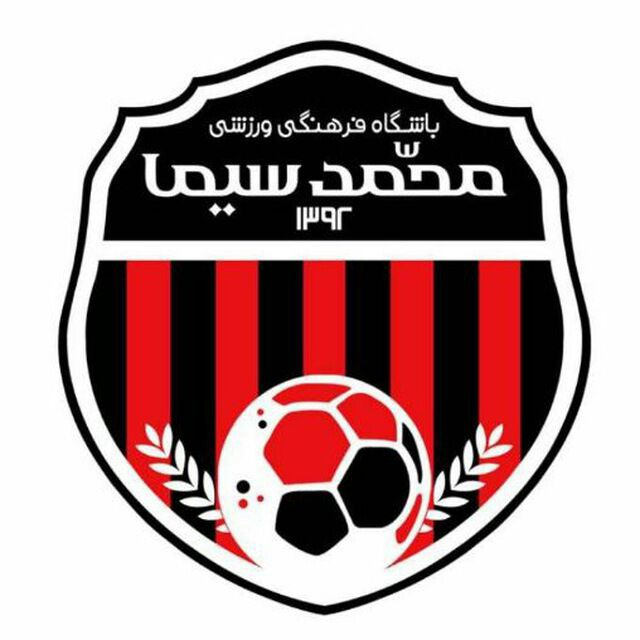
2018–2020

== Season to season ==
The table below chronicles the achievements of the Club in various competitions.

Season	League									Leagues top goalscorer	
Season	Division	P	W	D	L	GF	GA	Pts	Pos	Name	Goals
2013–14	Qom league										
2014–15	2nd Division	Renamed Ana Beton									
2014–15	2nd Division	12	7	4	1	40	20	25	1st / Group South-East		
2014–15	Play Off	2	0	1	1	8	9	1	7th		
2015–16	1st Division	Renamed Atoliyeh Tehran								Ruhollah Isari	15
2015–16	1st Division	14	7	3	4	36	31	24	3rd / Group A	Ruhollah Isari	15
2016–17	1st Division	16	9	2	5	60	43	29	2nd / Group A	Mohsen Bakhshi; Saeid Ghalandari	16
2016–17	Play Off	6	3	1	2	18	15	10	2nd	Mohsen Bakhshi; Saeid Ghalandari	16
2017–18	Super League	26	11	7	8	71	64	40	5th	Taha Nematian	12
2018–19	Super League	Renamed Sohan Mohammad Sima								Ruhollah Isari	22
2018–19	Super League	26	11	7	8	69	74	40	6th	Ruhollah Isari	22
2018–19	Play Off	4	2	1	1	9	7	7	4th	Ruhollah Isari	22
2019–20	Super League	26	11	5	10	77	68	38	7th	Ruhollah Isari	20
2019–20	Play Off	2	0	0	2	4	11	0	7th	Ruhollah Isari	20
2020–21	Super League	Renamed Ferdows								Ruhollah Isari	16
2020–21	Super League	12	4	3	5	36	36	15	4th / Group A	Ruhollah Isari	16
2021–22	Super league	26	6	7	13	61	86	25	10th	Masoud Abbasi	18
2022–23	Super League	Renamed Ana Sanat Pasargad								Behdad Sheikh Ahmadi	9
2022–23	Super League	26	8	4	14	52	66	28	11th	Behdad Sheikh Ahmadi	9
2023–24	Super league	6	4	1	1	16	10	13	4th	Soran Balkaneh; Abolghasem Orouji	4
Qom league total											
2nd Division total		14	7	5	2	48	29	26			
1st Division total		36	19	6	11	114	89	63			
Super league total		154	57	35	62	395	422	206			
Total		204	83	46	75	557	540	295			

Last updated: 7 September 2023

Notes:
* unofficial titles
1 worst title in history of club

Key

- P = Played
- W = Games won
- D = Games drawn
- L = Games lost
- GF = Goals for
- GA = Goals against
- Pts = Points
- Pos = Final position

Champions	Runners-up	Third Place	Fourth Place	Relegation	Promoted	Did not qualify	not held

== Honours ==
- Iran Futsal's 1st Division

Runners-up (1): 2016–17

== Players ==
=== Current squad ===
As of 5 August 2023

#	Position	Name	Nationality
1	Goalkeeper	Mojtaba Nemati	(Iran)
5	Defender	Soran Balkaneh	(Iran)
6	Left flank	Alireza Vafaei	(Iran)
7	Right flank	Shahab Basharidoust	(Iran)
10	Right flank	Abolghasem Orouji	(Iran)
13	Defender	Hashem Farajzadeh	(Iran)
14		Fardin Ghasemi	(Iran)
17		Amir Hamzeh Seddighzadeh	(Iran)
18		Amir Mohammad Moradbayati	(Iran)
19	Left flank	Masoud Abbasi	(Iran)
20	Goalkeeper	Amir Hossein Arbabi	(Iran)
21	Goalkeeper	Hamid Reza Dehnamaki	(Iran)
27		Arta Rezaei	(Iran)
77	Right flank	Mohammad Arjmandzadeh	(Iran)
78		Reza Hosseinpour	(Afghanistan)
79	Flank	Mohammad Rahmati	(Iran)
88		Milad Barahouei	(Iran)
99		Abolfazl Hashemi	(Iran)

=== Notable players ===
- (Iran) Alireza Vafaei
- (Iran) Ruhollah Isari
- (Iran) Meysam Ilanlou
- (Iran) Taha Nematian
- (Iran) Saeid Ghasemi
- (Iran) Saeid Ghalandari
- (Iran) Ali Ebrahimbeigi
- (Iran) Mohammad Dehghan
- (Iran) Abolghasem Orouji
- (Iran) Mohammad Beyzaeinejad
- (Iran) Mohammad Kouhestani
- (Iran) Mohammad Kermani
- (Iran) Mehdi Hassanzadeh
- (Iran) Hashem Farajzadeh
- (Iran) Mohsen Shanoufi
- (Iran) Mohammad Geravand
- (Iran) Shahab Basharidoust
- (Iran) Masoud Ayazipour
- (Iran) Mohsen Bakhshi
- (Iran) Hossein Razavi
- (Iran) Nasser Etminan
- (Iran) Jafar Najafi
- (Iran) Hamid Rashidi
- (Iran) Hossein Amini
- (Iran) Mahdi Fathi
- (Iran) Ali Mikaeili
- (Iran) Ali Hosseini
- (Iran) Mohammad Ghadimi
- (Iran) Mohammad Barzegar
- (Iran) Ali Asghar Ahmadi
- (Iran) Mehran Rezapour
- (Iran) Masoud Abbasi
- (Iran) Mohammad Hatefi
- (Afghanistan) Reza Hosseinpour
- (Afghanistan) Mohammad Ali Fayazi
- (Afghanistan) Mahdi Norouzi

=== Club captains ===
#	Name	Captaincy
1	(Iran) Ali Ebrahimbeigi	2014–2015
2	(Iran) Mohammad Dehghan	2015–2016
3	(Iran) Ali Ebrahimbeigi	2016–2017
4	(Iran) Hashem Farajzadeh	2017–2020
5	(Iran) Saeid Ghasemi	2020–2021
6	(Iran) Nasser Etminan	2021
7	(Iran) Ruhollah Isari	2021–2022
8	(Iran) Hashem Farajzadeh	2022–

== Personnel ==
=== Current technical staff ===
Position	Name
Head coach	(Iran) Hossein Sabouri
Assistant coach	(Iran) Hossein Ganjian
Goalkeeping coach	(Iran) Mohammad Dehghan
Doctor	(Iran) Reza Farjad
Masseur	(Iran) Ali Alizadeh
Team manager	(Iran) Ali Masoudi
Procurement manager	(Iran) Mostafa Vafaei
Procurement	(Iran) Hassan Rezaei
Media director	(Iran) Hamed Esmaeili
Photographer	(Iran) Mohsen Amini
Head of academy	(Iran) Ebrahim Jokar
Under-21's head coach	(Iran) Vahid Ghiasi
Under-21's team manager	(Iran) Ebrahim Jokar
Under-19's head coach	(Iran) Vahid Ghiasi
Under-17's head coach	(Iran) Mahdi Kakaei
Under-17's assistant coaches	(Iran) Mohammad Javad Esmaeili (Iran) Hamed Rezaei
Under-17's goalkeeping coach	(Iran) Reza Zareei
Under-17's team manager	(Iran) Morteza Beydaghi

Last updated: 1 September 2023

== Managers ==
Last updated: 7 September 2023

Name	Nat	From	To	Record				
Name	Nat	From	To	M	W	D	L	Win %
Abolfazl Sani	(Iran)	2013	May 2015					
Mahdi Ghiasi	(Iran)	May 2015	July 2015	12	7	4	1	58.33
Yadollah Yamola	(Iran)	July 2015	December 2015	2	0	1	1	0.00
Bahram Vafaei	(Iran)	December 2015	December 2015	3	2	0	1	66.67
Ahmad Jalali	(Iran)	December 2015	January 2016	3	0	2	1	0.00
Hossein Sabouri	(Iran)	January 2016	November 2016	8	5	1	2	62.50
Vahid Ghiasi	(Iran)	November 2016	May 2018	48	23	10	15	47.92
Hossein Sabouri	(Iran)	May 2018	April 2019	30	13	8	9	43.33
Mahdi Ghiasi	(Iran)	April 2019	August 2019	8	4	2	2	50.00
Mohsen Hassanzadeh	(Iran)	August 2019	December 2019	11	5	2	4	45.45
Vahid Ghiasi	(Iran)	December 2019	January 2020	9	2	1	6	22.22
Hossein Sabouri	(Iran)	September 2020	March 2021	12	4	3	5	33.33
Ali Zandipour	(Iran)	July 2021	October 2021	6	2	0	4	33.33
Reza Zarkhanli	(Iran)	October 2021	March 2022	20	4	7	9	20.00
Vahid Ghiasi	(Iran)	July 2022	September 2022	8	1	3	4	12.50
Saeid Ghasemi	(Iran)	September 2022	December 2022	9	4	0	5	44.44
Farhad Keshavarz	(Iran)	December 2022	March 2023	9	3	1	5	33.33
Hossein Sabouri	(Iran)	March 2023	Present	6	4	1	1	66.67

== Club officials ==
Position	Name
Owner	(Iran) Majid Sherafati
Chairman	(Iran) Mohammad Sherafati
Vice-chairman	(Iran) Rouzbeh Boroufeh
Chairman of the board	(Iran) Majid Sherafati
Members of the board	(Iran) Ahmad Reza Homami (Iran) Rouzbeh Boroufeh (Iran) Mohammad Sherafati (Iran) Majid Sherafati

Last updated: 19 August 2023

== Club statistics and records ==
=== Statistics in super league ===
- Seasons in Iranian Futsal Super League: 7
- Best position in Iranian Futsal Super League: 4th (2018–19)
- Worst position in Iranian Futsal Super League: 11th (2022–23)
- Most goals scored in a season: 81 (2019–20)
- Most goals scored in a match:
  - Sohan Mohammad Sima 7 - 5 Ahoora
  - Sohan Mohammad Sima 7 - 2 Shahin
  - Ferdows 7 - 2 Shahrvand
- Most goals conceded in a match:
  - Ferdows 2 - 9 Giti Pasand
- Top scorer: Ruhollah Isari with 75 goals

=== General statistics ===
- All-time most goals scored in a match:
  - Atoliyeh Tehran 8 - 3 Shahrdari Neka
  - Atoliyeh Tehran 8 - 1 Shahed Shiraz

=== Top goalscorers ===
As of 19 August 2023
No.	Player	Years	Goals
1	(Iran) Ruhollah Isari	2015–2016, 2017–2022	100
2	(Iran) Saeid Ghalandari	2014–2018, 2019–2020, 2021–2023	45
3	(Iran) Alireza Vafaei	2018–2020, 2023–	29
4	(Iran) Mohsen Bakhshi	2015–2019	27
4	(Iran) Nasser Etminan	2017–2021	27
6	(Iran) Masoud Abbasi	2021–2022, 2023–	21
7	(Iran) Mehran Rezapour	2017–2018, 2021–2022	17
8	(Iran) Taha Nematian	2017–2018	14
8	(Iran) Hossein Razavi	2015–2017, 2018–2023	14
8	(Iran) Hashem Farajzadeh	2017–2020, 2022–	14
