= Vahid Ghiasi =

Iranian retired futsal player

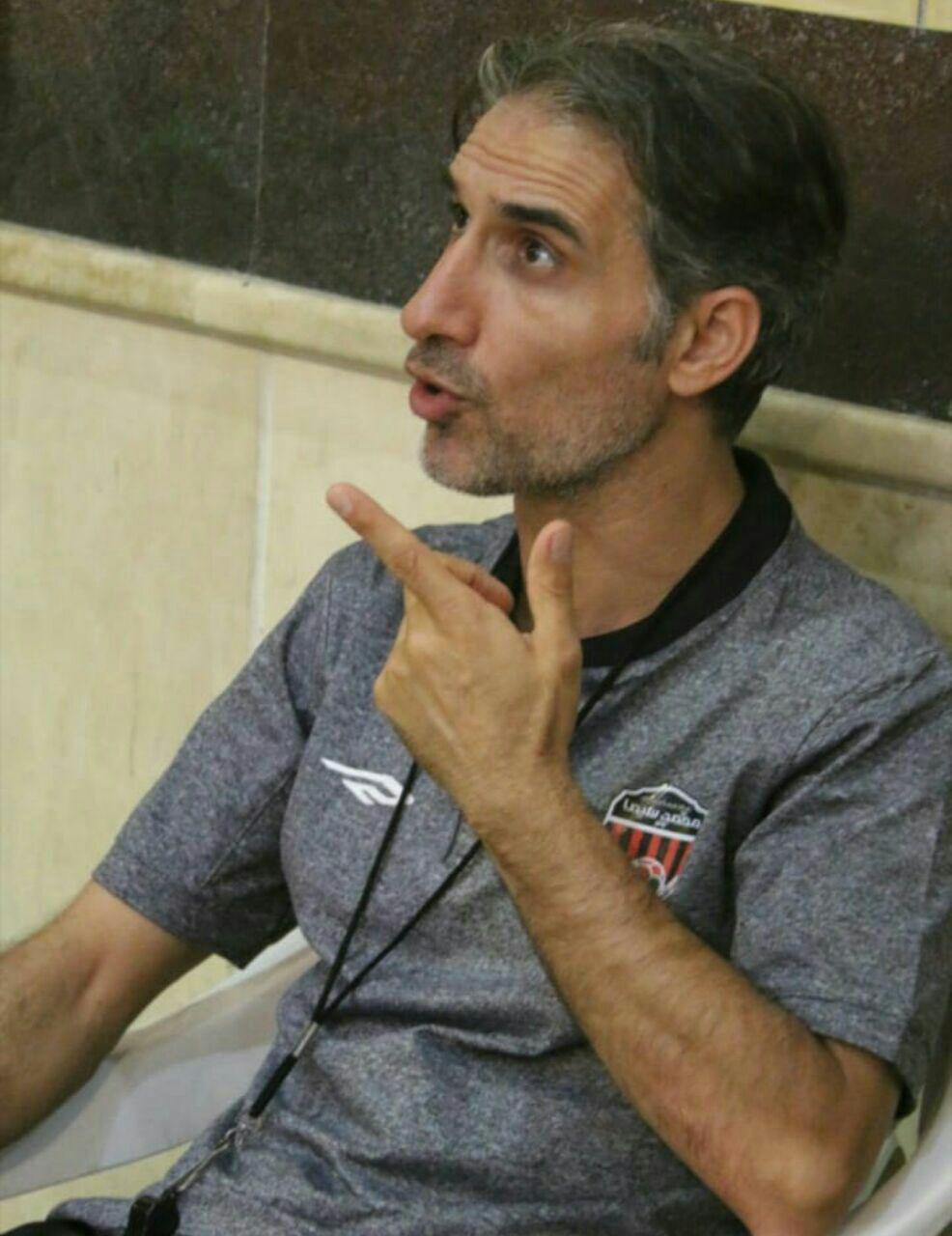
- Ghiasi with Ana Sanat in 2019

Personal information
- Full name: Seyyed Vahid Ghiasi
- Date of birth: 23 August 1975 (age 51)
- Place of birth: Qom, Iran

Team information
- Current team: Ana Sanat (youth)

Youth career
- Soheil (football)

Senior career*
| Years | Team | Apps | (Gls) |
- Pars Khodro (football)
- Fajr Sepah
- Eram Kish
| 2008–2009 | Faraz | | |
| 2009–2010 | Eram Kish | | |
| 2010–2011 | Kish Air | | |
| 2011–2012 | Saba | | (4) |
| 2012–2013 | Dabiri | | (0) |

International career^{‡}
- Iran

Managerial career
- 2009: Eram Kish (Player-coach)
- 2010–2011: Kish Air (Player-coach)
- 2013: Mahan Tandis
- 2014: Mahan Tandis
- 2016: Sunich
- 2016–2018: Ana Sanat
- 2018: Almas Shahr
- 2018–2019: Apko Pars
- 2019: Ana Sanat (assistant)
- 2019–2020: Ana Sanat
- 2020: Omid Pirouz Kavir
- 2020–2021: Ana Sanat (technical manager)
- 2021: Delsoukhtegan Ahlebeit
- 2021–2022: Shahrdari Saveh
- 2022: Ana Sanat
- 2023–: Ana Sanat (youth)
- * Club domestic league appearances and goals as of 12 August 2023 ‡ National team caps and goals as of 29 July 2019

Seyyed Vahid Ghiasi (Persian: سید وحید غیاثی; born 23 August 1975) is an Iranian professional futsal coach and former player, currently the head coach of Ana Sanat youth team. He is the younger brother of Mahdi Ghiasi.

== Honours ==
=== Player ===
- Iranian Futsal Super League
  - Runners-up (1): 2004–05 (Eram Kish)

=== Manager ===
- Iran Futsal's 1st Division
  - Runners-up (1): 2016–17 (Ana Sanat)
