= Walex dos Santos =

Brazilian futsal player

Personal information
- Full name: Walex Raimundo dos Santos
- Date of birth: 8 March 1993 (age 33)
- Place of birth: Estância, Brazil
- Position: Winger

Team information
- Current team: Peñíscola

Senior career*
Years	Team	Apps	(Gls)
- Lagarto
- Vento em Popa
2015	Boquim		
2016–2017	Grêmio América		
2018	Jaraguá	16	(7)
2019	Sorocaba	44	(8)
2019–2020	Giti Pasand		(5)
2020–	Peñíscola		

International career^{‡}
2018–	Brazil		
- * Club domestic league appearances and goals as of 19:15, 9 July 2020 (UTC) ‡ National team caps and goals as of 00:00, 30 June 2019 (UTC)

Walex Raimundo dos Santos (born 8 March 1993), also known as Lacraia, is a Brazilian futsal player who plays as a winger for Peñíscola and the Brazil national futsal team.
