= Taha Mortazavi =

Iranian futsal player (born 1988)

Personal information
- Full name: Taha Mortazavi SorkhKolaei
- Date of birth: 28 May 1988 (age 38)
- Place of birth: Sari, Iran
- Height: 1.78 m (5 ft 10 in)
- Position: Left winger

Youth career
- Shahrvand

Senior career*
Years	Team	Apps	(Gls)
–2013	Shahrvand		
2013–2014	Giti Pasand		(0)
2014–2015	Shahrdari Saveh		(2)
2015–2021	Shahrvand		(78)
2021–2022	Giti Pasand		(5)

International career^{‡}
- Iran U23
2013–	Iran	12	(2)
- * Club domestic league appearances and goals as of 26 July 2022 ‡ National team caps and goals as of 28 April 2021

Taha Mortazavi SorkhKolaei (Persian: طه مرتضوی سرخکُلائی; born 28 May 1988) is an Iranian professional futsal player.

== Honours ==
=== Country ===
- Asian Indoor and Martial Arts Games
  - Champion (2): 2009 - 2013

=== Club ===
- AFC Futsal Club Championship
  - Runner-Up (1): 2013 (Giti Pasand)
- Iranian Futsal Super League
  - Runners-up (1): 2013–14 (Giti Pasand)

== International goals ==
#	Date	Venue	Opponent	Score	Result	Competition
1	8 June 2013	(Iran) Shahid Dastgerdi Arena, Tehran	Uzbekistan	3 – 1	9 – 3	Friendly
2	15 June 2013	(China) Zhejiang Dragon Sports Centre, Hangzhou	China	1 – 0	5 – 2	Friendly
