= Ruhollah Isari =

Iranian futsal player

Personal information
- Full name: Ruhollah Isari
- Date of birth: 2 June 1992 (age 34)
- Place of birth: Sorkheh, Iran
- Position: Pivot

Team information
- Current team: Sunich

Youth career
- 2010–2011: Darband Roz Mehdishahr

Senior career*
| Years | Team | Apps | (Gls) |
| 2011–2012 | Saman Rayan Semnan | | (12) |
| 2012 | Beton Saraye Salim | | |
| 2012–2013 | MDF Rostamian Semnan | | |
| 2013–2015 | Farid Qom | | |
| 2015–2016 | Ana Sanat | | (25) |
| 2016–2017 | Yasin Pishro | | (5) |
| 2017–2022 | Ana Sanat | | (75) |
| 2020 | → Badamlı Naxçıvan (loan) | 5 | (10) |
| 2021 | → Soro Company (loan) | | (15) |
| 2022– | Sunich | | (0) |
- * Club domestic league appearances and goals as of 11 September 2022

Ruhollah Isari (Persian: روح الله ایثاری; born 2 June 1992) is an Iranian professional futsal player. He is currently a member of Sunich in the Iranian Futsal Super League.

== Honours ==
=== Club ===
- Badamli - Naxçıvan Kuboku
  - Champion (1): 2019–20 (Badamlı Naxçıvan)
- Tajikistan Futsal Super Cup
  - Champion (1): 2021 (Soro Company)
- Tajikistan Futsal League
  - Champion (1): 2021 (Soro Company)
