= Reza Fallahzadeh =

Futsal player and coach

Personal information
- Full name: Reza Fallahzadeh
- Date of birth: 11 December 1976 (age 49)

Team information
- Current team: Buta Pars Iranian (manager)

Senior career*
Years	Team	Apps	(Gls)
1998–2001	Farid Karaj		
2001–2004	Persepolis		
2004–2006	Esteghlal		
2006–2009	Tam Iran Khodro		

Managerial career
- 2011–2017: Moghavemat Alborz
- 2017–2018: Vamos Mataram
- 2018–2019: Shahrdari Saveh
- 2021–: Buta Pars Iranian
- * Club domestic league appearances and goals as of 2 February 2022

Reza Fallahzadeh (Persian: رضا فلاح زاده; born 11 December 1976) is an Iranian professional futsal coach and former player. He is currently head coach of Buta Pars Iranian in the Iran Futsal's 1st Division.

== Honours ==
=== Player ===
- Iranian Futsal Super League
  - Champion (1): 2007–08 (Tam Iran Khodro)

=== Manager ===
- Iran Futsal's 1st Division
  - Champion (1): 2013–14 (Moghavemat Alborz)
- Iran Futsal's 2nd Division
  - Champion (1): 2013 (Moghavemat Alborz)
- Indonesia Pro Futsal League
  - Champion (2): 2017 - 2018 (Vamos Mataram)
