= Hossein Sabouri =

Iranian futsal coach

Personal information
- Full name: Hossein Sabouri
- Date of birth: 3 July 1978 (age 48)
- Place of birth: Qom, Iran

Team information
- Current team: Ana Sanat (manager)

Senior career*
Years	Team	Apps	(Gls)
- Faraz Qom
- Shensa
- Eram Kish
2007–2008	Zoghalsang		
2008–2010	Eram Kish		
2010–2011	Kish Air		
2011–2012	Saba		(1)

Managerial career
- 2016: Ana Sanat
- 2016–2017: Shahrdari Saveh (assistant)
- 2017–2018: Ana Sanat (assistant)
- 2018–2019: Ana Sanat
- 2019–2020: Shahrdari Saveh
- 2020–2021: Ana Sanat
- 2021: Shahrdari Saveh
- 2021–2022: Sunich (assistant)
- 2022–2023: Sunich
- 2023–: Ana Sanat
- * Club domestic league appearances and goals as of 5 August 2023

Hossein Sabouri (Persian: حسین صبوری; born 3 July, 1978) is an Iranian professional futsal coach and former player. He currently serves as the head coach of Ana Sanat in the Iranian Futsal Super League.

== Honours ==
=== Player ===
- Iranian Futsal Super League
  - Runners-up (2): 2004–05 (Eram Kish), 2008–09 (Eram Kish)
