= Reza Oghabi =

Iranian football manager (born 1953)

Personal information
- Date of birth: 14 June 1969 (age 57)
- Place of birth: Saveh, Iran
- Position: Forward

Youth career
- Esteghlal Saveh

Senior career*
Years	Team	Apps	(Gls)
- Esteghlal Saveh
1989–1991	Oghab		
1991–1992	Bank Sepah		
1992–1993	Persepolis		
1993–1996	Shamoushak		
1996–1998	Sepahan		
1998–1999	Fajr Sepasi		
1999–2000	Machine Sazi		
2000–2004	Shamoushak		

International career
	Iran	5	

Managerial career
- 2003–2005: Academi Shensa Saveh
- 2005–2006: Tarbiat Badani Saveh
- 2006–2007: Saveh Shan
- 2007–2008: Tarbiat Badani Saveh
- 2008–2009: Zar Sim Saveh
- 2009–2010: Jam Jam Yazd
- 2010–2013: Shahrdari Saveh
- 2014: Shahrdari Saveh
- 2015–: Sunich Saveh
- * Club domestic league appearances and goals

Reza Oghabi (Persian: رضا عقابی, born 5 June 1953 in Saveh) is a retired Iranian football player and now coach.
