= Giti Pasand Isfahan FSC =

Giti Pasand
- Full name: Sanaye Giti Pasand Isfahan Futsal Club
- Founded: 8 July 2010; 16 years ago
- Ground: Pirouzi Indoor Stadium, Isfahan
- Capacity: 4,300
- Owner: Alireza Jannati
- Chairman: Alireza Jannati
- Head coach: Mohammad Keshavarz
- League: Iranian Futsal Super League
- 2021–22: 1st of 14 (champions)
- Website: http://www.sgpco-club.com/
Home colours

Sanaye Giti Pasand Futsal Club (Persian: باشگاه فوتسال صنایع گیتی‌پسند) is part of Giti Pasand Sports Club in Iran. It is based in Isfahan.

== Season to season ==
The table below chronicles the achievements of the Club in various competitions.

Season	League										Rank	League's top goalscorer	
Season	Division		P	W	D	L	GF	GA	Pts	Pos	Rank	Name	Goals
2010–11	Super League		Replaced for Sadra								Runners-up	Masoud Daneshvar	24
2010–11	Super League		23	13	7	3	83	54	46	2nd	Runners-up	Masoud Daneshvar	24
2011–12	Super League		26	20	5	1	101	42	59^{1}	2nd	Runners-up	Rudimar Venâncio	21
2011–12	AFC Futsal Club Championship	Group stage	3	3	0	0	20	1	9	1st	Champions	Ahmad Esmaeilpour	9
2011–12	AFC Futsal Club Championship	Semi-finals	Giti Pasand Isfahan 6 - 3 (Japan) Nagoya Oceans								Champions	Ahmad Esmaeilpour	9
2011–12	AFC Futsal Club Championship	Finals	Giti Pasand Isfahan 2 - 1 (Uzbekistan) Ardus Tashkent								Champions	Ahmad Esmaeilpour	9
2012–13	Super League		24	18	4	2	100	46	58	1st	Champions	Ahmad Esmaeilpour	28
2012–13	AFC Futsal Club Championship	Group stage	3	2	0	1	8	7	6	2nd	Runners-up	Mohammad Taheri / Hossein Tayyebi	3
2012–13	AFC Futsal Club Championship	Semi-finals	Giti Pasand Isfahan 3-2 (Japan) Nagoya Oceans								Runners-up	Mohammad Taheri / Hossein Tayyebi	3
2012–13	AFC Futsal Club Championship	Finals	Giti Pasand Isfahan 1-1 (1-4 P) (Thailand) Chonburi Blue Wave								Runners-up	Mohammad Taheri / Hossein Tayyebi	3
2013–14	Super League		26	18	5	3	112	60	59	2nd	Runners-up	Ahmad Esmaeilpour	25
2013–14	Hazfi Cup	Fourth Round	Giti Pasand Isfahan 3 – 0 (w/o) Azarakhsh Bandar Abbas								Withdrew	—	—
2013–14	Hazfi Cup	Fifth Round	Giti Pasand Isfahan 0 – 3 (w/o) Pas Qavamin Tehran								Withdrew	—	—
2014–15	Super League		26	14	8	4	87	60	50	2nd	Runners-up	Ahmad Esmaeilpour	24
2015–16	Super League		25	15	5	5	94	65	50	3rd^{1}	Third Place	Mahdi Javid	23
2016–17	Super League		26	19	3	4	112	63	60	1st	Champions	Mahdi Javid	36
2017–18	Super League		26	15	6	5	93	63	51	3rd^{1}	Third Place	Ahmad Esmaeilpour	24
2017–18	AFC Futsal Club Championship	Group stage	2	2	0	0	10	2	6	1st	Runners-up	Ahmad Esmaeilpour	7
2017–18	AFC Futsal Club Championship	Quarter-finals	Giti Pasand Isfahan 2 – 0 (Lebanon) Bank of Beirut								Runners-up	Ahmad Esmaeilpour	7
2017–18	AFC Futsal Club Championship	Semi-finals	Giti Pasand Isfahan 4 – 2 (Qatar) Al Rayyan								Runners-up	Ahmad Esmaeilpour	7
2017–18	AFC Futsal Club Championship	Finals	Giti Pasand Isfahan 2 – 3 (Thailand) Chonburi Blue Wave								Runners-up	Ahmad Esmaeilpour	7
2018–19	Super League	Group stage	26	22	1	3	111	58	67	1st	Runners-up	Mahdi Javid	37
2018–19	Super League	Quarter-finals	1st leg: Giti Pasand 6 – 1 Moghavemat Alborz; 2nd leg: Moghavemat Alborz 1 – 6 Giti Pasand								Runners-up	Mahdi Javid	37
2018–19	Super League	Semi-finals	1st leg: Melli Haffari 3 – 2 Giti Pasand; 2nd leg: Giti Pasand 5 – 0 Melli Haffari								Runners-up	Mahdi Javid	37
2018–19	Super League	Finals	1st leg: Mes Sungun 0 – 0 Giti Pasand; 2nd leg: Giti Pasand 3 – 5 Mes Sungun								Runners-up	Mahdi Javid	37
2019–20	Super League	Group stage	26	15	9	2	89	56	54	2nd	Runners-up	Saeid Ahmadabbasi	28
2019–20	Super League	Quarter-finals	1st leg: Sohan Mohammad Sima Qom 2 – 6 Giti Pasand; 2nd leg: Giti Pasand 5 – 2 Sohan Mohammad Sima Qom								Runners-up	Saeid Ahmadabbasi	28
2019–20	Super League	Semi-finals	1st leg: Sunich Saveh 4 – 7 Giti Pasand; 2nd leg: Giti Pasand 4 – 5 Sunich Saveh; 3rd leg: Giti Pasand 5 – 2 Sunich Saveh								Runners-up	Saeid Ahmadabbasi	28
2019–20	Super League	Finals	1st leg: Giti Pasand 4 – 3 Mes Sungun; 2nd leg: Mes Sungun 3 (6) – 3 (5) Giti Pasand								Runners-up	Saeid Ahmadabbasi	28
Super league total			267	176	55	36	1037	604	577				
AFC futsal club championship total			15	12	1	2	58	22	37				
Total			282	188	56	38	1095	626	614				

Last updated: December 29, 2021

^{1} Persepolis and Giti Pasand were penalized 6 points in the 2011–12 season by the Iranian Football Federation. Notes:
* unofficial titles
1 worst title in history of club

Key

- P = Played
- W = Games won
- D = Games drawn
- L = Games lost
- GF = Goals for
- GA = Goals against
- Pts = Points
- Pos = Final position

Champions	Runners-up	Third Place	Fourth Place	Relegation	Promoted	Did not qualify	not held

== Honours ==
=== Domestic ===
- Iranian Futsal Super League

Winners (5): Futsal Super League,2012–13, 2016–17, 2021–22 2023–24
Runners-up (8): 2010, 2010–11, 2011–12, 2013–14, 2014–15, 2018–19, 2019–20, 2020–21

=== Continental ===
- AFC Futsal Club Championship

Winners (1): 2012
Runners-up (2): 2013, 2017

=== Individual ===
Best player

- Futsal goalkeeper of the world in 2010 – Mostafa Nazari
- Asian Futsaler of the Year 2011 – Mohammad Keshavarz
- Best futsal player of the 2016–17 Iranian Futsal Super League – Ali Asghar Hassanzadeh
- Best goalkeeper of the 2015–16 Iranian Futsal Super League – Sepehr Mohammadi
- Best goalkeeper of the 2016–17 Iranian Futsal Super League – Sepehr Mohammadi
- AFC Futsal Club Championship MVP Award:
  - (Iran) 2012 - Mohammad Keshavarz
  - (Iran) 2017 - Ali Asghar Hassanzadeh
- Iran World Cup captains:
  - (Iran) 2012 – Mohammad Keshavarz

Top Goalscorer

- Iranian Futsal Super League:

2010–11 Iranian Futsal Super League
(Iran) Masoud Daneshvar (24 goals)
2012–13 Iranian Futsal Super League
(Iran) Ahmad Esmaeilpour (28 goals)
2013–14 Iranian Futsal Super League
(Iran) Ahmad Esmaeilpour (25 goals)
2016–17 Iranian Futsal Super League
(Iran) Mahdi Javid (36 goals)
2018–19 Iranian Futsal Super League
(Iran) Mahdi Javid (37 goals)
2020–21 Iranian Futsal Super League
(Iran) Saeid Ahmadabbasi (26 goals)
2021–22 Iranian Futsal Super League
(Iran) Saeid Ahmadabbasi (41 goals)

- AFC Futsal Club Championship:

2012 AFC Futsal Club Championship
(Iran) Ahmad Esmaeilpour (9 goals)
Best Manager

- Best Manager of the 2016–17 Iranian Futsal Super League – Reza Lak Aliabadi

Best Team

- Best Team of the 2016–17 Iranian Futsal Super League

== Statistics and records ==
=== Statistics in super league ===
- Seasons in Iranian Futsal Super League: 12
- Best position in Iranian Futsal Super League: First (2012–13, 2016–17, 2021–22)
- Worst position in Iranian Futsal Super League: 3rd (2015–16, 2017–18)
- Most goals scored in a season: 133 (2018–19)
- Most goals scored in a match: 11 - 2, 11 - 4
- Most goals conceded in a match: 5 - 6, 0 - 6
- Top scorer: Saeid Ahmadabbasi with 147 goals

=== Statistics in AFC Futsal Club Championship ===
- Most goals scored in a match: 8 – 0 (1 time)
- Most goals conceded in a match: 6 - 3

=== General statistics ===
- All-time top scorer: Ahmad Esmaeilpour with 154 goals (All Competitions)
- All-time Most Appearances:
- Player who has won most titles:

=== Top goalscorers ===
As of 29 August 2022
No.	Player	Years	Goals
1	(Iran) Ahmad Esmaeilpour	2012–2018	154
2	(Iran) Saeid Ahmadabbasi	2017–2022	147
3	(Iran) Mahdi Javid	2013–2017, 2018–2019	139
4	(Iran) Ali Asghar Hassanzadeh	2016–2018, 2019–	80
5	(Iran) Afshin Kazemi	2010–2015, 2016–2019	60
6	(Iran) Saeid Taghizadeh	2012–2016	50
7	(Iran) Mohammad Keshavarz	2011–2015, 2016–2020	42
8	(Iran) Mehran Alighadr	2015–2017, 2018–2020	40
9	(Iran) sajjad Bandi Saadi	2010–2014	37
10	(Iran) Masoud Daneshvar	2010–2012, 2017–2018	34

== Players ==
=== Current squad ===
As of 7 December 2022

#	Position	Name	Nationality
1	Goalkeeper	Sepehr Mohammadi	(Iran)
2	Goalkeeper	Abolfazl Hassankhani	(Iran)
6	Winger	Alireza Vafaei	(Iran)
7	Defender	Ali Asghar Hassanzadeh	(Iran)
8	Defender	Mohammad Shajari	(Iran)
10	Winger	Ali Morovvati	(Iran)
11	Winger	Abolghasem Orouji	(Iran)
13	Winger	Masoud Yousef	(Iran)
17	Pivot	Alireza Askari Kohan	(Iran)
18	Defender	Farhad Tavakoli	(Iran)
28	Goalkeeper	Behzad Rasouli	(Iran)
32		Sina Esfandiari	(Iran)
77	Winger	Mohammad Hossein Derakhshani	(Iran)
99	Winger	Mehdi Karimi	(Iran)
	Left flank	Farhad Fakhimzadeh	(Iran)
		Hossein Khoddami Fard	(Iran)
		Reza Ghanbari	(Iran)
		Shayan Akbari	(Iran)
		Amin Jafari	(Iran)
		Ramin Khanahmadi	(Iran)

=== World cup players ===
(Thailand) World Cup 2012

- (Iran) Mohammad Keshavarz
- (Iran) Afshin Kazemi
- (Iran) Hossein Tayyebi
- (Iran) Ahmad Esmaeilpour
- (Iran) Sepehr Mohammadi

(Colombia) World Cup 2016

- (Iran) Sepehr Mohammadi
- (Iran) Ahmad Esmaeilpour
- (Iran) Mohammad Keshavarz
- (Iran) Ali Asghar Hassanzadeh
- (Iran) Afshin Kazemi
- (Iran) Mehran Alighadr
- (Iran) Mahdi Javid

=== Notable players ===
- (Iran) Vahid Shamsaei
- (Iran) Alireza Vafaei
- (Iran) Ahmad Esmaeilpour
- (Iran) Mohammad Keshavarz
- (Iran) Mojtaba Nassirnia
- (Iran) Majid Tikdarinejad
- (Iran) Abolghasem Orouji
- (Iran) Moslem Oladghobad
- (Iran) Mohammad Shajari
- (Iran) Saeid Ahmadabbasi
- (Iran) Hamid Ahmadi
- (Iran) Saeid Taghizadeh
- (Iran) Mostafa Nazari
- (Iran) Mahdi Javid
- (Iran) Sepehr Mohammadi
- (Iran) Mohammad Taheri
- (Iran) Vahid Shafiei
- (Iran) Ghodrat Bahadori
- (Iran) Hossein Tayyebi
- (Iran) Mehran Alighadr
- (Iran) Masoud Daneshvar
- (Iran) Farhad Tavakoli
- (Iran) Ebrahim Masoudi
- (Iran) Taha Mortazavi
- (Iran) Alireza Samimi
- (Iran) Afshin Kazemi
- (Iran) Farhad Fakhimzadeh
- (Iran) Ali Asghar Hassanzadeh
- (Iran) Mohammad Hashemzadeh
- (Iran) Mohammad Reza Sangsefidi
- (Iran) Meysam Khayyam
- (Brazil) Rudimar Venâncio
- (Brazil) Alê Falcone
- (Brazil) Walex dos Santos
- (Brazil) Gabriel Laranjeira de Angelo
- (Brazil) Jonatan Bruno Santiago
- (Brazil) Vitor Hugo Da Silva
- (Brazil) Lucas Rozenski
- (Brazil) João Batista

== Personnel ==
=== Current technical staff ===
Position	Name
Head coach	(Iran) Mohammad Keshavarz
Assistant coaches	(Iran) Ahmad Pari Azar (Iran) Mehdi Mohammadi
Goalkeeping coach	(Iran) Hamid Reza Abrarinia
Fitness coach	(Iran) Amir Houshang Momeni
Analyst	(Iran) Mojtaba Mazrouei
Supervisor	(Iran) Ali Havakeshian
Doctor	(Iran) Reza Nikbakht
Assistant doctor	(Iran) Hossein Nazifi
Masseurs	(Iran) Ehsan Rezvani (Iran) Mostafa Karimi
Procurment	(Iran) Masoud Zareein
Manager of futsal teams	(Iran) Mohsen Ghaedi
Director of sports medicine	(Iran) Amirhossein Rowshanfekr
Media director	(Iran) Javad Sharif
Under-23's supervisor	(Iran) Taghi Mousavi
Under-23's head coach	(Iran) Ali Nateghi
Under-20's supervisor	(Iran) Majid Ghasemi
Under-20's head coach	(Iran) Behrouz Khademi
Under-17's supervisor	(Iran) Taghi Mousavi
Under-17's head coach	(Iran) Alireza Jafari
Under-17's assistant coaches	(Iran) Meysam Zhianmehr (Iran) Reza Amini
Under-14's supervisor	(Iran) Majid Ghasemi
Under-14's head coach	(Iran) Amir Diani
Under-14's assistant coaches	(Iran) Ahmad Reza Abedi (Iran) Mohammad Sajjad Mohammadi
Technical advisor to the base teams	(Iran) Mehdi Mohammadi

Last updated: November 19, 2021

== Managers ==
#	Name	Nat	Period			Honours	Note
#	Name	Nat	from	until	days	Honours	Note
1	Hossein Afzali	Iran	19 June 2010	21 September 2010	94 days	None	
2	Mohammad Nazemasharieh	Iran	21 September 2010	21 December 2010	91 days	None	
3	Mehdi Abtahi	Iran	21 December 2010	17 February 2011	58 days	Super League: 2010–11 Runner-up	
4	Alireza Afzal	Iran	25 April 2011	1 March 2013	1 year, 310 days	Super League: 2011–12 Runner-up - 2012–13 Champion; AFC Futsal Club Championship: 2012 Champion	
5	Reza Lak Aliabadi	Iran	10 June 2013	13 March 2014	276 days	AFC Futsal Club Championship: 2013 Runner-up; Super League: 2013–14 Runner-up	
6	Mohammad Keshavarz	Iran	4 August 2014	13 March 2015	221 days	Super League: 2014–15 Runner-up	
7	Mahmoud Khorakchi	Iran	14 June 2015	8 October 2015	116 days	None	
8	Reza Lak Aliabadi	Iran	15 October 2015	8 March 2017	1 year, 292 days	Super League: 2015–16 3rd - 2016–17 Champion	
9	Alireza Afzal	Iran	24 April 2017	21 October 2017	180 days	AFC Futsal Club Championship: 2017 Runner-up	
10	Hossein Shams	Iran	23 October 2017	10 January 2018	79 days	Super League: 2017–18 3rd	
11	Reza Lak Aliabadi	Iran	5 May 2018	8 March 2019	307 days	Super League: 2018–19 Runner-up	
12	Hamid Bigham	Iran	18 April 2018	27 June 2020	1 year, 70 days	Super League: 2019–20 Runner-up	
13	Vahid Shamsaei	Iran	26 July 2020	13 May 2021	291 days	Super League: 2020–21 Runner-up	
14	Mohammad Keshavarz	Iran	30 May 2021	Present	5 years, 81 days	Super League: 2021–22 Champion	

Last updated: 12 March 2022

== Club officials ==
Position	Name
Owner	(Iran) Alireza Jannati
Chairman	(Iran) Alireza Jannati
Vice-chairman	(Iran) Mohammad Hossein Araghizadeh
Consultant of chairman	(Iran) Masoud Tabesh
Chairman of the board	(Iran) Alireza Jannati
Members of the board	(Iran) Mohammad Hossein Araghizadeh (Iran) Mostafa Vaeidi (Iran) Pouria Jannati (Iran) Amirhossein Jannati
Member of the Technical Committee	(Iran) Mohammad Reza Karimi
Director of Public Relations	(Iran) javad sharif

Last updated: November 19, 2021

== See also ==
- Giti Pasand Football Club

Achievements
Preceded by Nagoya Oceans (Japan)	AFC Futsal Club Championship; 2012 (First title)	Succeeded by Chonburi Blue Wave (Thailand)
Preceded by Shahid Mansouri	Iranian Futsal Super League; 12-13 (First title)	Succeeded by Dabiri
Preceded by Tasisat Daryaei	Iranian Futsal Super League; 16-17 (Second title)	Succeeded by Mes Sungun
