= Parsian Shahr-e Qods FSC =

Iranian futsal club

Parsian
- Full name: Parsian Shahr-e Qods Futsal Club
- Dissolved: 3 April 2021
- Ground: Alghadir Indoor Stadium, Shahr-e Qods

Parsian Shahr-e Qods Futsal Club (Persian: باشگاه فوتسال پارسیان شهر قدس) was an Iranian professional futsal club based in Shahr-e Qods.

== Season by season ==
The table below chronicles the achievements of the Club in various competitions.

Season	League	Position	Notes
2016–17	1st Division	Replaced for Chakad Atiyeh
2016–17	1st Division	3rd / Group B
2017–18	Super League	bought Dabiri licence	Relegation
2017–18	Super League	13th	Relegation
2018–19	Super League	Replaced for Tasisat Daryaei	Relegation
2018–19	Super League	13th	Relegation
2019–20	1st Division	11th	Relegation

Last updated: July 20, 2021

Champions	Runners-up	Third Place	Fourth Place	Relegation	Promoted	Did not qualify	not held
