= 2016–17 Iran Futsal's 1st Division =

Iranian Futsal 1st Division
- Season: 2016–17
- Champions: Moghavemat Qarchak
- Promoted: Atoliyeh Tehran Qom; Moghavemat Qarchak
- Relegated: Est. Novin Mahshahr; Behrad; Rad Padafand; Sh. Mashhad
- Matches: 156
- Goals: 904 (5.79 per match)
- Top goalscorer: 26 Goals Hashem Shirali
- Biggest home win: Haji Monsef 10 - 2 Behrad
- Biggest away win: Behrad 1 - 6 Atoliyeh; Danesh Varzesh 5 - 10 Zagros; Zagros 4 - 9 Naft Omidiyeh
- Highest scoring: Danesh Varzesh 5 - 10 Zagros
- Longest winning run: 9 Games Parsian (6th week~15th week)
- Longest unbeaten run: 10 Games Sunich (1st week~11th week)
- Longest winless run: 13 Games Behrad (4th week~18th week)
- Longest losing run: 6 Games Behrad; Rad Padafand (12th week~18th week); Sh. Mashhad (6th week~12th week)

The 2016–17 Iranian Futsal 1st Division will be divided into two phases.

The league is composed of 18 teams divided into two divisions of 9 teams each, whose teams are divided geographically. Teams will play only other teams in their own division, once at home and once away for a total of 16 matches each.

== Teams ==
Locations of clubs in 2016–17 Futsal 1st Division

=== Group A ===
| Team | City | Venue | Capacity | Head coach | Past Season |
|---|---|---|---|---|---|
| Atoliyeh Tehran Qom | Qom | Behzisti | - | (Iran) Vahid Ghiasi | 3rd/Group A |
| Behrad Ardebil | Ardebil | Rezazadeh Stadium | 6,000 | (Iran) Hamidreza Eyni | Buy license from Federation |
| Esteghlal Novin | Mahshahr | Besat | - | (Iran) Mehdi Abtahi | 6th/Group A |
| Ferdosi Mashhad | Mashhad | - | - | (Iran) Mostafa Nemati | Relegated |
| Haji Monsef Qaem Shahr | Qaem Shahr | Azad University | - | (Iran) Iman Ahmadi | Buy license from Federation |
| Moble Karimi | Karaj | Enghelab | - | (Iran) Mohammad Karimi | 5th/Group A |
| Moghavemat Qarchak | Qarchak | 7th Tir | 3,000 | (Iran) Reza Zarkhanli | Buy license from Federation |
| Pas Qavamin | Tehran | Dastgerdi | - | (Iran) Gholamreza Moradi | 4th/Group A |
| Shahed Shiraz | Shiraz | 22 Bahman | - | (Iran) Amir Hossein Barzegar | 7th/Group B |

=== Group B ===
| Team | City | Venue | Capacity | Head coach | Past Season |
|---|---|---|---|---|---|
| Balan Sanat Shiraz | Shiraz | Shahid Abolfathi | - | (Iran) Ali Akbar Soltani | Replaced for Shahrdari Neka |
| Danesh Va Varzesh Fariman^{1} | Fariman | Motahari | - | (Iran) Ali Asghar Tavakoli | 4th/Group B |
| Naft Omidiyeh | Omidiyeh | Velayat | - | (Iran) Mahdi Heydari | Promoted |
| Parsian Shahr-e Qods | Shahr-e Qods | - | - | (Iran) Muhammad Yahyazadeh | Replaced for Chakad Atiyeh |
| Rad Padafand Isfahan | Isfahan | - | - | (Iran) Abbas Mirzaee | Replaced for Kashi Nilou |
| Shahrdari M.P. Mashhad | Mashhad | - | - | (Iran) Ahmad Shafiee | Promoted |
| Shahrdari Rasht | Rasht | - | - | (Iran) Hasan Arsalani | Buy license from Federation |
| Sunich Saveh | Saveh | Fajr-e Felestin | 2,500 | (Iran) Reza Oghabi | 4th/Play Off |
| Zagros Khozestan | Ahvaz | Jahad Keshavarzi | - | (Iran) Yaghob Maraghi | 3rd/Group B |

- ^{1} Paj Mashhad Renamed to Danesh Va Varzesh Fariman

Note: Persepolis Behzisti and Bank Resalat Kerman Withdrew from the league before the start of competition.

== League standings ==
=== Group A ===
| Pos | Team | Pld | W | D | L | GF | GA | GD | Pts | Qualification or relegation |
|---|---|---|---|---|---|---|---|---|---|---|
| 1 | Moghavemat Qarchak | 16 | 8 | 6 | 2 | 57 | 34 | +23 | 30 | Promoted playoff |
| 2 | Atoliyeh Tehran Qom | 16 | 9 | 2 | 5 | 60 | 43 | +17 | 29 | Promoted playoff |
| 3 | Haji Monsef | 16 | 8 | 4 | 4 | 50 | 35 | +15 | 28 | |
| 4 | Ferdosi | 16 | 7 | 2 | 7 | 41 | 42 | −1 | 23 | |
| 5 | Shahed Shiraz | 16 | 7 | 1 | 8 | 41 | 52 | −11 | 22 | |
| 6 | Pas Qavamin | 16 | 6 | 3 | 7 | 43 | 48 | −5 | 21 | |
| 7 | Moble Karimi | 16 | 5 | 5 | 6 | 56 | 51 | +5 | 20 | |
| 8 | Est. Novin Mahshahr | 16 | 5 | 3 | 8 | 44 | 54 | −10 | 18 | Relegation to Iran Futsal's 2nd Division |
| 9 | Behrad | 16 | 2 | 4 | 10 | 31 | 64 | −33 | 10 | Relegation to Iran Futsal's 2nd Division |

Updated to match(es) played on 16 March 2017. Source: Futsal Iran.IR
Rules for classification: 1) points; 2) goal difference; 3) number of goals scored.

=== Group B ===
| Pos | Team | Pld | W | D | L | GF | GA | GD | Pts | Qualification or relegation |
|---|---|---|---|---|---|---|---|---|---|---|
| 1 | Sunich | 16 | 13 | 2 | 1 | 65 | 44 | +21 | 41 | Promoted playoff |
| 2 | Naft Omidiyeh | 16 | 12 | 0 | 4 | 55 | 31 | +24 | 36 | Promoted playoff |
| 3 | Parsian | 16 | 11 | 0 | 5 | 45 | 29 | +16 | 33 | |
| 4 | Zagros | 16 | 6 | 3 | 7 | 54 | 52 | +2 | 21 | |
| 5 | Sh. Rasht | 16 | 5 | 5 | 6 | 41 | 42 | −1 | 20 | |
| 6 | Danesh Varzesh | 16 | 6 | 1 | 9 | 48 | 60 | −12 | 19 | |
| 7 | Balan Sanat | 16 | 4 | 3 | 9 | 33 | 44 | −11 | 15 | |
| 8 | Rad Padafand | 16 | 4 | 1 | 11 | 37 | 55 | −18 | 13 | Relegation to Iran Futsal's 2nd Division |
| 9 | Sh. Mashhad | 16 | 2 | 3 | 11 | 33 | 54 | −21 | 9 | Relegation to Iran Futsal's 2nd Division |

Updated to match(es) played on 16 March 2017. Source: Futsal Iran.IR
Rules for classification: 1) points; 2) goal difference; 3) number of goals scored.

== Results table ==
=== Group A ===
| Home \ Away | ATQ | BEH | ESM | FER | HMQ | MKA | MOQ | QAV | SHA |
|---|---|---|---|---|---|---|---|---|---|
| Atoliyeh Tehran Qom | | 3–0 | 5–4 | 5–3 | 4–3 | 6–5 | 3–3 | 5–1 | 8–1 |
| Behrad | 1–6 | | 1–1 | 2–1 | 3–3 | 2–2 | 1–5 | 1–2 | 2–3 |
| Est. Novin Mahshahr | 4–2 | 4–5 | | 1–2 | 2–2 | 7–6 | 2–2 | 4–1 | 3–2 |
| Ferdosi | 3–2 | 3–0 | 6–4 | | 1–1 | 3–2 | 0–4 | 1–1 | 3–0 |
| Haji Monsef | 2–2 | 10–2 | 2–1 | 4–3 | | 1–0 | 4–3 | 6–1 | 4–2 |
| Moble Karimi | 3–1 | 3–3 | 7–3 | 4–2 | 1–0 | | 2–2 | 4–5 | 2–3 |
| Moghavemat Qarchak | 5–3 | 7–2 | 7–0 | 3–1 | 5–3 | 4–4 | | 1–1 | 0–3 |
| Pas Qavamin | 2–3 | 7–3 | 4–2 | 5–4 | 3–4 | 4–4 | 1–2 | | 3–1 |
| Shahed Shiraz | 3–2 | 4–3 | 1–3 | 4–5 | 2–1 | 5–7 | 4–4 | 3–2 | |

Updated to match(es) played on 16 March 2017. Source:
Legend: Blue = home team win; Yellow = draw; Red = away team win.

=== Group B ===
| Home \ Away | BAL | DVF | NAF | PAR | RAD | SHM | SHR | SUN | ZAG |
|---|---|---|---|---|---|---|---|---|---|
| Balan Sanat | | 2–2 | 0–2 | 1–2 | 2–3 | 6–2 | 2–1 | 3–5 | 5–5 |
| Danesh Varzesh | 0–3 | | 0–4 | 4–3 | 7–3 | 5–1 | 2–4 | 3–6 | 5–10 |
| Naft Omidiyeh | 4–0 | 4–0 | | 2–5 | 2–1 | 3–2 | 5–2 | 2–3 | 5–3 |
| Parsian | 3–0 | 4–2 | 1–3 | | 4–2 | 2–1 | 1–2 | 6–2 | 1–4 |
| Rad Padafand | 5–1 | 1–4 | 2–1 | 0–1 | | 4–3 | 5–6 | 3–6 | 1–2 |
| Sh. Mashhad | 2–3 | 2–4 | 4–5 | 0–3 | 3–2 | | 1–1 | 5–5 | 3–2 |
| Sh. Rasht | 2–2 | 4–3 | 2–3 | 1–3 | 1–1 | 6–2 | | 3–3 | 2–2 |
| Sunich | 2–1 | 6–2 | 2–1 | 5–4 | 5–3 | 2–1 | 4–3 | | 5–1 |
| Zagros | 4–2 | 3–5 | 4–9 | 0–2 | 7–1 | 1–1 | 3–1 | 3–4 | |

Updated to match(es) played on 16 March 2017. Source:
Legend: Blue = home team win; Yellow = draw; Red = away team win.

== Clubs season-progress ==
| | Win |
| | Draw |
| | Lose |
| | Bye |
| W/O | Withdrew |

| Team ╲ Round | 1 | 2 | 3 | 4 | 5 | 6 | 7 | 8 | 9 | 10 | 11 | 12 | 13 | 14 | 15 | 16 | 17 | 18 |
|---|---|---|---|---|---|---|---|---|---|---|---|---|---|---|---|---|---|---|
| Atoliyeh Tehran Qom | D | W | L | B | W | L | W | L | W | W | W | D | B | L | W | L | W | W |
| Balan Sanat | W | L | D | L | L | L | B | D | W | D | L | L | L | L | L | B | W | W |
| Behrad | D | W | W | L | B | D | L | L | L | D | D | L | L | B | L | L | L | L |
| Danesh Varzesh | W | L | W | W | W | L | L | D | B | W | L | W | L | L | L | L | L | B |
| Est. Novin Mahshahr | W | L | L | W | L | W | L | B | L | W | D | D | L | D | L | W | B | L |
| Ferdosi | B | W | L | D | L | L | L | W | W | B | W | W | L | D | L | W | L | W |
| Haji Monsef | D | L | W | D | W | D | B | W | L | L | W | D | W | L | W | B | W | W |
| Moble Karimi | D | W | D | D | L | B | W | L | L | D | L | L | D | W | B | L | W | W |
| Moghavemat Qarchak | W | B | W | D | W | W | L | W | W | D | B | D | D | D | W | D | W | L |
| Naft Omidiyeh | W | W | B | L | W | W | W | W | L | W | L | B | L | W | W | W | W | W |
| Parsian | B | L | L | W | L | W | W | W | W | B | W | W | W | W | W | L | W | L |
| Pas Qavamin | L | L | D | L | W | L | W | L | B | D | L | W | W | D | W | W | L | B |
| Rad Padafand | L | W | L | W | D | B | L | L | W | L | W | L | L | L | B | L | L | L |
| Shahed Shiraz | L | W/O | B | W | L | W | W | W | W | L | L | B | W | W | L | D | L | L |
| Sh. Mashhad | L | B | D | L | W | L | L | L | L | L | B | L | W | D | L | L | D | L |
| Sh. Rasht | L | W | D | B | D | L | L | L | D | D | W | W | B | W | D | W | L | L |
| Sunich | W | W | W | W | B | W | W | W | D | W | W | L | W | B | W | W | D | W |
| Zagros | L | L | D | L | L | W | W | B | L | L | L | W | W | D | D | W | B | W |

== Play off ==
=== Standings ===
| Pos | Team | Pld | W | D | L | GF | GA | GD | Pts | Qualification |
|---|---|---|---|---|---|---|---|---|---|---|
| 1 | Moghavemat Qarchak | 6 | 3 | 2 | 1 | 19 | 16 | +3 | 11 | Iranian Futsal Super League |
| 2 | Atoliyeh Tehran Qom | 6 | 3 | 1 | 2 | 18 | 15 | +3 | 10 | Iranian Futsal Super League |
| 3 | Sunich | 6 | 2 | 2 | 2 | 18 | 23 | −5 | 8 | |
| 4 | Naft Omidiyeh | 6 | 1 | 1 | 4 | 15 | 16 | −1 | 4 | |

Updated to match(es) played on 23 July 2019. Source: Futsalcasa.com
Rules for classification: 1) points; 2) goal difference; 3) number of goals scored.

=== Results table ===
| Home \ Away | ATQ | MOQ | NAF | SUN |
|---|---|---|---|---|
| Atoliyeh Tehran Qom | | 2–1 | 3–0 | 2–2 |
| Moghavemat Qarchak | 5–4 | | 2–2 | 5–3 |
| Naft Omidiyeh | 2–3 | 2–3 | | 7–2 |
| Sunich | 5–4 | 3–3 | 3–2 | |

Updated to match(es) played on 23 July 2019. Source:
Legend: Blue = home team win; Yellow = draw; Red = away team win.

=== Clubs season-progress ===
| Win |
| Draw |
| Lose |

| Team ╲ Round | 1 | 2 | 3 | 4 | 5 | 6 |
|---|---|---|---|---|---|---|
| Atoliyeh Tehran Qom | L | L | W | W | D | W |
| Moghavemat Qarchak | W | W | W | L | D | D |
| Naft Omidiyeh | W | L | L | L | D | L |
| Sunich | L | W | L | W | D | D |

== See also ==
- 2016–17 Futsal Super League
- 2017 Futsal's 2nd Division
- 2016–17 Iran Pro League
- 2016–17 Azadegan League
- 2016–17 Iran Football's 2nd Division
- 2016–17 Iran Football's 3rd Division
- 2016–17 Hazfi Cup
- Iranian Super Cup
