= Shahrdari Saveh FSC =

Iranian futsal club

Shahrdari Saveh
- Full name: Shahrdari Saveh Futsal Club
- Founded: 2006; 19 years ago
- Ground: Fajr-e Felestin Hall
- Capacity: 2,500
- Owner: Saveh Municipality
- Chairman: Mohammad Shokravi
- Head Coach: Saeid Keshavarzi
- League: Iran Futsal's 1st Division
- 2020–21: 5th / Group B

Shahrdari Saveh Futsal Club (Persian: باشگاه فوتسال شهرداری ساوه) is an Iranian professional futsal club based in Saveh.

== History ==
The club was originally known as Saveh Shen, competing in the 2nd Division since the 2006. In the first season of 2007–08 Iran Futsal's 1st Division it was renamed Tarbiat Badani Saveh due to change of sponsorship. In the 2008–09 Iran Futsal's 1st Division they were renamed again to Zar Sim Saveh. They were once again renamed for the 2010–11 to Shahrdari Saveh.

== Season-by-season ==
The table below chronicles the achievements of the Club in various competitions.

Season	League	Position	Hazfi Cup	Notes	Manager
2005–06	2nd Division				Reza Oghabi
2006–07	2nd Division	1st		Promoted Play Off	Reza Oghabi
2007–08	1st Division	3rd / Group A			Reza Oghabi
2008–09	1st Division	3rd / Group B			Reza Oghabi
2009–10	1st Division	6th / Group B			Davoud Choupani
2010–11	1st Division	2nd / Group B		Promoted Play Off	Reza Oghabi
2011–12	Super League	9th			Reza Oghabi
2012–13	Super League	9th			Reza Oghabi
2013–14	Super League	11th	Round of 32		Mehdi Abtahi / Reza Oghabi
2014–15	Super League	13th		Relegation	Reza Oghabi / Mahmoud Khorakchi
2015–16	1st Division	2nd / Group B		Promoted Play Off	Mohsen Khabiri
2016–17	Super League	6th			Mohsen Hassanzadeh
2017–18	Super League	10th			Masoud Naji / Reza Lak Aliabadi
2018–19	Super League	14th		Relegation	Mohsen Khabiri / Reza Fallahzadeh
2019–20	1st Division	3rd / Group B			Reza Oghabi / Hossein Sabouri
2020–21	1st Division	5th / Group B			Masoud Kianfar / Hossein Sabouri
2021–22	1st Division				Vahid Ghiasi / Mehrdad Karimi

Last updated: 16 July 2022

Champions	Runners-up	Third Place	Fourth Place	Relegation	Promoted	Did not qualify	not held

== Honours ==
- Iran Futsal's 1st Division
  - Champions (1): 2010–11
  - Runners-up (1): 2015–16
- Iran Futsal's 2nd Division
  - Champions (1): 2007

== Players ==
=== Current squad ===
As of 9 December 2022

#	Position	Name	Nationality
5		Morteza Vakili	(Iran)
12	Goalkeeper	Javad Kamali	(Iran)
15		Mojtaba Kamran	(Iran)
17		Reza Babanazari	(Iran)
23	Goalkeeper	Amir Hesam Erfani Nasab	(Iran)
33		Vahid Ehsani	(Iran)
44		Behnam Khademi	(Iran)
77		Mahdi Goudarzi	(Iran)
88		Morteza Alishahi	(Iran)
	Pivot	Hassan Mohammadi	(Iran)
		Ali Ramezanpour	(Iran)
	Defender	Mohammad Amirhosseini	(Iran)
		Mostafa Fakhri	(Iran)
	Pivot	Mohammad Zareei	(Iran)
		Mohsen Baghishani	(Iran)

=== Notable players ===
- (Iran) Mohsen Hassanzadeh
- (Iran) Mohammad Shajari
- (Iran) Moslem Oladghobad
- (Iran) Ahmad Esmaeilpour
- (Iran) Esmaeil Abbasian
- (Iran) Mohammad Beyzaeinejad
- (Iran) Saeid Taghizadeh
- (Iran) Mojtaba Nassirnia
- (Iran) Saeid Ghalandari
- (Iran) Ali Rahnama
- (Iran) Reza Naseri
- (Iran) Ali Kiaei
- (Iran) Taha Mortazavi
- (Iran) Saeid Ghasemi
- (Iran) Vahid Shafiei
- (Iran) Ali Hosseini
- (Iran) Mohammad Kouhestani
- (Iran) Hamid Rashidi
- (Iran) Mostafa Zarifian
- (Iran) Mehdi Karimi
- (Iran) Mohsen Shonoufi
- (Iran) Mehran Rezapour
- (Iran) Mohammad Vazirzadeh
- (Iran) Ali Morovvati
- (Iran) Mehdi Hassanzadeh
- (Iran) Maziar Amirkhanlou
- (Iran) Mojtaba Moridizadeh
- (Iran) Ehsan Mohammadian
- (Iran) Ehsan Zahmatkesh
- (Iran) Shahram Sharifzadeh
- (Iran) Esmaeil Vatankhah
- (Brazil) Rudimar Venâncio

== Personnel ==
=== Current technical staff ===
Position	Name
Head coach	(Iran) Saeid Keshavarzi
Assistant coaches	(Iran) Sajjad Mirahmadi (Iran) Nasser Babaei
Goalkeeping coach	(Iran) Vahid Ehsani
Supervisor	(Iran) Mohammad Jokar
Procurment	(Iran) Ali Akbar Ahmadi
Under-23's head coach	(Iran) Hamid Ashrafi
Under-20's head coach	(Iran) Sajjad Mirahmadi

Last updated: 7 December 2022
