= Shahin Kermanshah FSC =

Iranian futsal club

Shahin
- Full name: Shahin Kermanshah Futsal Club
- Nickname(s): شاهین ها (Falcons)
- Founded: 2012; 13 years ago
- Ground: Shohadaye Bazi Deraz Indoor Stadium, Kermanshah
- Capacity: 700
- Owner: Ehsan Ehsani
- Chairman: Ehsan Ehsani
- Head coach: Mansour Mahmoudi
- League: Iran Futsal's 1st Division
- 2020–21: 2nd / Group C

Shahin Kermanshah Futsal Club (Persian: باشگاه فوتسال شاهین کرمانشاه) is an Iranian professional futsal club based in Kermanshah.

== Season by season ==
The table below chronicles the achievements of the Club in various competitions.

Season	League	Position	Notes
2012–13	2nd Division	5th / Group B
2013–14	2nd Division	3rd
2014–15	2nd Division	1st / Group North-West
2015–16	2nd Division	2nd / Group 3
2016–17	2nd Division	4th / Group A
2017–18	2nd Division	2nd / Group B	Promoted
2018–19	1st Division	2nd / Group B	Promoted Play Off
2019–20	Super League	14th	Relegation
2020–21	1st Division	2nd / Group C
2021–22	1st Division

Last updated: 17 February 2022

Champions	Runners-up	Third Place	Fourth Place	Relegation	Promoted	Did not qualify	not held

== Honours ==
- Iran Futsal's 1st Division
  - Champions (1): 2018–19

== Players ==
=== Current squad ===
As of 14 March 2022

#	Position	Name	Nationality
1	Goalkeeper	Mohammad Mohammadi	(Iran)
4		Hamid Mohammadi	(Iran)
7		Payam Rostami	(Iran)
8	Pivot	Kouros Mohammadi	(Iran)
9		Babak Sohrabi	(Iran)
10		Ramin Babajani	(Iran)
11		Majid Salehi	(Iran)
14		Ali Mohammadi	(Iran)
17		Mohsen Saeidi	(Iran)
19		Hamed Eivani	(Iran)
20		Alireza Ahmadi	(Iran)
21		Milad Najafi	(Iran)
22	Goalkeeper	Erfan Jamshidi	(Iran)
23		Mohammad Reza Shamkhali	(Iran)
26		Abbas Zandi	(Iran)
30	Goalkeeper	Meysam Sousani	(Iran)
70	Defender	Dariush Kakavandi	(Iran)
88	Winger	Hamid Reza Soleimani	(Iran)
98		Ali Nouri	(Iran)
		Mahdi Shekari	(Iran)

== Personnel ==
=== Current technical staff ===
Position	Name
Head coach	(Iran) Mansour Mahmoudi
Assistant coaches	(Iran) Amirhossein Dowlatyari (Iran) Hadi Soleimani
Supervisor	(Iran) Ehsan Ehsani
Physiotherapist	(Iran) Milad Gholami
Procurment	(Iran) Jahanshah Valadian

Last updated: 9 April 2022
