= Moghavemat Qarchak FSC =

Iranian futsal club

Moghavemat Qarchak
- Full name: Shohadaye Moghavemat Qarchak Futsal Club
- Founded: 2014
- Dissolved: 2019
- Ground: Shohadaye 7th Tir Indoor Stadium, Qarchak
- Capacity: 3.000

Shohadaye Moghavemat Qarchak Futsal Club (Persian: باشگاه فوتسال شهدای مقاومت قرچک) was an Iranian professional futsal club based in Qarchak.

== Season-by-season ==
The table below chronicles the achievements of the Club in various competitions.

Season	League	Position	Hazfi	Notes
2013–14	2nd Division	6th/Main Round	Third Round
2014–15	2nd Division	4th/North-East
2015–16	2nd Division	3rd/Main Round
2016–17	1st Division	1st/Main Round		Buy license from Federation
2017–18	Super League	8th
2018–19	Super League	11th

Last updated: December 20, 2021

Champions	Runners-up	Third Place	Fourth Place	Relegation	Promoted	Did not qualify	not held
