= List of Iranian futsal league winning managers =

This is a list of Iranian League winning futsal managers.

== By year ==
=== Province championship ===
Season	Nationality	Winning manager	Club
1996–97			Gilan province
1997–98			Tehran province
1998–99			Tehran province
1999–00			Fars province
2000–01			Tehran province
2001–02			Tehran province

=== Premier league ===
Season	Nationality	Winning manager	Club
1998–99	Iran	Mehdi Abtahi	Peyman
1999–00	Iran	Mehdi Abtahi	Peyman
2000–01	Iran	Mehdi Abtahi	Esteghlal
2001–02	Iran	Mohammad Reza Heidarian	Esteghlal
2002–03	Iran	Hossein Shams	Pas

=== Super league ===
Season	Nationality	Winning manager	Club
2003–04	Iran	Saeid Tahmtan	Shensa
2004–05	Iran	Mohammad Hassan Ansarifard	Tam Iran Khodro
2005–06	Brazil	Sávio Sousa	Shensa
2007–08	Iran	Mahmoud Khorakchi	Tam Iran Khodro
2008–09	Iran	Alireza Afzal	Foolad Mahan
2009–10	Iran	Hossein Afzali	Foolad Mahan
2010–11	Iran	Reza Lak Aliabadi	Shahid Mansouri
2011–12	Iran	Reza Lak Aliabadi	Shahid Mansouri
2012–13	Iran	Alireza Afzal	Giti Pasand
2013–14	Iran	Amir Shamsaei	Dabiri
2014–15	Iran	Vahid Shamsaei	Tasisat Daryaei
2015–16	Iran	Vahid Shamsaei	Tasisat Daryaei
2016–17	Iran	Reza Lak Aliabadi	Giti Pasand
2017–18	Iran	Hamid Bigham	Mes Sungun
2018–19	Iran	Esmaeil Taghipour	Mes Sungun
2019–20	Iran	Alireza Afzal	Mes Sungun
2020–21	Iran	Ahmad Baghbanbashi	Mes Sungun
2021–22	Iran	Mohammad Keshavarz	Giti Pasand
2022–23	Iran	Esmaeil Taghipour	Mes Sungun
2023–24			

== See also ==
- List of Iranian football league winning managers
- Iranian Futsal Super League
- List of Iranian Futsal champions
- List of Iranian club futsal top goal scorers
