= 2012–13 Iranian Futsal Super League =

Iranian Futsal Super League
- Season: 2012–13
- Champions: Giti Pasand
- Relegated: Arjan Shiraz
- 2013 AFC Futsal Club Championship: Giti Pasand
- Matches: 144
- Goals: 963 (6.69 per match)
- Top goalscorer: 28 Goals; Ali Asghar Hassanzadeh; Ahmad Esmaeilpour
- Biggest home win: Saba Qom 9 – 2 Arjan; Saba Qom 10 – 3 Gaz Khozestan; Giti Pasand 11 - 4 Gaz Khozestan
- Biggest away win: Gaz Khozestan 0 - 8 Giti Pasand
- Highest scoring: Giti Pasand 11 - 4 Gaz Khozestan
- Longest winning run: 8 Games; Saba Qom
- Longest unbeaten run: 14 Games; Saba Qom
- Longest winless run: 10 Games; Arjan
- Longest losing run: 10 Games; Arjan

The 2012–13 Iranian Futsal Super League are the 14th season of the Iran Pro League and the 9th under the name Futsal Super League. Shahid Mansouri are the defending champions. The season will feature 14 teams from the 2011–12 Iranian Futsal Super League and two new teams promoted from the 2011–12 Iran Futsal's 1st Division: Shahrdari Tabriz and Gaz Khozestan. The regular season, was played from 26 July 2012.

== Teams ==
Locations of clubs in 2012–13 Iranian Futsal Super League

Team	City	Venue	Capacity	Head coach	Team captain	Past Season
Arjan	Shiraz	Shahid Abolfathi	–	(Iran) Hamid Reza Kamali	–	10th
Dabiri	Tabriz	Oloum Pezeshki	2,000	(Iran) Shahram Dabiri Oskouei	(Iran) Farhad Fakhim	14th
Farsh Ara	Mashhad	Shahid Beheshti	6,000	(Iran) Hamid Bigham	–	8th
Gaz Khozestan	Ahvaz	Shohada Gaz	–	(Iran) Mohammad Reza Davoudinejad	–	Promoted
Giti Pasand	Isfahan	Pirouzi	4,300	(Iran) Alireza Afzal	(Iran) Mohammad Keshavarz	2nd
Hilal Ahmar	Tabriz	Hilal Ahmar	–	(Iran) Alireza Khosravi	–	Replaced for Gostaresh Foolad
Misagh	Tehran	Shahrdari Mantagheh 11	300	(Iran) Mahmoud Khorakchi	–	12th
Melli Haffari Iran	Ahvaz	Naft	1,000	(Iran) Seyed Mehdi Abtahi	–	4th
Rah	Sari	Sayed Rasoul Hosseini	5,000	(Iran) Jaber Kiyannejad	(Iran) Mahmoud Lotfi	13th
Saba	Qom	Shahid Heidarian	2,000	(Iran) Mohsen Hassanzadeh	(Iran) Mohsen Hassanzadeh	6th
Shahid Mansouri	Gharchak	7th Tir	3,000	(Iran) Reza Lak Aliabadi	–	Champion
Shahrdari Saveh	Saveh	Fajr-e Felestin	2,500	(Iran) Reza Oghabi	(Iran) Reza Nasseri	9th
Shahrdari Tabriz	Tabriz	Tavana	1,000	(Iran) Esmaeil Taghipour	(Iran) Moslem Rostamiha	Promoted

1- Persepolis, Firooz Sofeh and Foolad Mahan withdrew from the league before the beginning.
2- Rah sari and Dabiri Tabriz, in last season placed 13th and 14th in table and Relegatian to the 1st Division. But by the increasing of the number of teams, futsal committee decided to stay at the Super league.

== Managerial changes ==
=== Before the start of the season ===
Team	Outgoing head coach	Manner of departure	Date of vacancy	Position in table	Incoming head coach	Date of appointment
Farsh Ara	(Iran) Majid Mortezaei	Contract expired	9 March 2012	Pre-season	(Iran) Hamid Bigham	1 May 2012
Dabiri Tabriz	(Iran) Hasan Ali Shiri	Contract expired	9 March 2012	Pre-season	(Iran) Mehdi Ghiasi	15 June 2012
Saba Qom	(Iran) Hossein Ganjian	Contract expired	9 March 2012	Pre-season	(Iran) Amir Shamsaei	26 June 2012
Rah Sari	(Iran) Alireza Radi	Contract expired	9 March 2012	Pre-season	(Iran) Mohammad Reza Heidarian	20 July 2012
Shahrdari Tabriz	(Iran) Hossein Ghazaei	Contract expired		Pre-season	(Iran) Esmaeil Taghipour	

=== In season ===
Team	Outgoing head coach	Manner of departure	Date of vacancy	Position in table	Incoming head coach	Date of appointment	Position in table
Dabiri Tabriz	(Iran) Mehdi Ghiasi	?	2012		(Iran) Shahram Dabiri Oskouei	2012	4th
Saba Qom	(Iran) Amir Shamsaei	Resigned	11 September 2012	3rd	(Iran) Ghodratollah Bagheri	24 September 2012	1st
Misagh Tehran	(Iran) Reza Zarkhanli	Resigned	5 October 2012	11th	(Iran) Mahmoud Khorakchi	6 October 2012	5th
Rah Sari	(Iran) Mohammad Reza Heidarian	Sacked	9 December 2012	8th	(Iran) Jaber Kiyannejad	9 December 2012	10th
Saba Qom	(Iran) Ghodratollah Bagheri	Resigned	December 2012	1st	(Iran) Mohsen Hassanzadeh	December 2012	2nd
Gaz Khozestan	(Iran) Heydar Farhadi	Sacked	26 December 2012	13th	(Iran) Mohammad Reza Davoudinejad	26 December 2012	12th
Arjan Shiraz	(Iran) Vahid Nematollahi	Sacked	4 February 2013	13th	(Iran) Hamid Reza Kamali	4 February 2013	13th

== League standings ==
Pos	Team	Pld	W	D	L	GF	GA	GD	Pts	Qualification or relegation
1	Giti Pasand (C)	24	18	4	2	100	46	+54	58	AFC Futsal Club Championship
2	Saba Qom	24	18	2	4	124	66	+58	56	
3	Shahid Mansouri	24	16	1	7	76	63	+13	49	
4	Dabiri Tabriz	24	11	4	9	71	69	+2	37	
5	Misagh Tehran	24	10	6	8	83	68	+15	36	
6	Melli Haffari Iran	24	10	6	8	66	58	+8	36	
7	Sh. Tabriz	24	10	6	8	74	70	+4	36	
8	Farsh Ara	24	11	2	11	75	74	+1	35	
9	Sh. Saveh	24	8	5	11	63	74	−11	29	
10	Rah Sari	24	7	2	15	67	79	−12	23	
11	Hilal Ahmar Tabriz	24	5	2	17	51	89	−38	17	
12	Gaz Khozestan	24	5	2	17	60	106	−46	17	
13	Arjan (R)	24	5	2	17	53	101	−48	17	Relegation to 2013–14 Iran Futsal's 1st Division
14	Firooz Sofeh (R)	0	0	0	0	0	0	0	0	Withdrew from the league
15	Foolad Mahan (R)	0	0	0	0	0	0	0	0	Withdrew from the league
16	Persepolis (R)	0	0	0	0	0	0	0	0	Withdrew from the league

Updated to match(es) played on 3 March 2013. Source: Futsal Planet (in English)
Rules for classification: 1) points; 2) goal difference; 3) number of goals scored.
(C) Champions; (R) Relegated

== Positions by round ==
Team ╲ Round	1	2	3	4	5	6	7	8	9	10	11	12	13	14	15	16	17	18	19	20	21	22	23	24	25	26
Giti Pasand	6	3	1	1	2	1	2	3	2	1	1	2	2	2	2	2	2	2	2	2	2	2	2	2	2	1
Saba Qom	2	2	3	3	1	3	3	2	1	3	2	1	1	1	1	1	1	1	1	1	1	1	1	1	1	2
Shahid Mansouri	13	8	11	6	6	7	6	5	3	2	5	4	5	6	5	3	3	3	3	4	3	3	3	3	3	3
Dabiri Tabriz	4	7	9	5	5	4	4	6	6	6	6	6	6	5	6	6	6	5	4	3	4	4	4	4	4	4
Misagh Tehran	1	4	5	8	9	9	9	9	11	10	10	10	10	10	9	10	10	8	8	8	8	8	7	8	7	5
Melli Haffari Iran	5	1	2	2	3	2	1	1	4	4	3	3	4	3	4	5	5	6	6	5	5	5	5	7	5	6
Sh. Tabriz	12	9	6	7	7	5	7	7	8	8	7	7	8	9	10	8	7	7	7	6	7	6	6	5	6	7
Farsh Ara	3	6	4	4	4	6	5	4	5	5	4	5	3	4	3	4	4	4	5	7	6	7	8	6	8	8
Sh. Saveh	9	5	7	9	10	10	10	10	9	9	8	9	9	8	7	7	8	9	10	10	10	10	9	9	9	9
Rah Sari	8	10	8	10	8	8	8	8	7	7	9	8	7	7	8	9	9	10	9	9	9	9	10	10	10	10
Hilal Ahmar Tabriz	11	13	10	11	11	12	12	13	13	12	12	12	11	11	11	11	11	11	11	11	11	11	11	11	11	11
Gaz Khozestan	10	11	12	12	13	11	11	11	12	13	13	13	13	13	13	13	12	12	12	12	12	12	12	12	12	12
Arjan	7	12	13	13	12	13	13	12	10	11	11	11	12	12	12	12	13	13	13	13	13	13	13	13	13	13

Leader / 2013 AFC Futsal Club Championship
Relegation to the 2013–14 Iran Futsal's 1st Division

== Results table ==
Home \ Away	ARJ	DAB	ARA	GAZ	SGP	HLA	HFR	MIS	RAS	SAB	MAN	SHS	SHT
Arjan		1–5	3–5	5–4	1–6	1–0	2–5	2–1	6–3	4–6	2–5	3–4	1–4
Dabiri Tabriz	5–2		6–4	2–1	2–2	3–1	4–6	2–2	4–2	6–5	2–3	5–2	3–4
Farsh Ara	1–2	2–3		5–4	2–1	3–3	3–0 (Note: Melli Haffari received a technical loss of 3-0 to Farsh Ara.)	2–2	3–1	5–4	0–1	5–3	3–4
Gaz Khozestan	1–1	1–0	3–1		0–8	5–1	1–3	5–6	5–4	2–4	2–3	3–2	2–5
Giti Pasand	9–3	3–2	6–5	11–4		3–1	2–0	4–4	2–1	5–2	4–0	3–1	4–0
Hilal Ahmar Tabriz	3–2	1–3	2–6	4–3	1–6		6–4	4–4	1–5	1–4	3–4	6–4	0–3
Melli Haffari Iran	3–0	2–2	3–0	6–2	3–2	5–1		0–3	2–2	4–4	3–4	1–1	4–4
Misagh Tehran	6–4	3–2	1–3	7–1	1–2	2–3	1–2		4–3	1–2	7–4	3–3	3–3
Rah Sari	5–2	1–4	5–6	4–4	3–4	2–1	3–2	4–1		2–6	2–4	2–4	6–5
Saba Qom	9–2	7–1	6–1	10–3	3–3	9–4	3–0 (Note: The game score was 3-2 in favor of Saba until the 19:33 minute of second half.)	8–5	3–2		5–2	4–1	6–2
Shahid Mansouri	4–2	5–2	4–3	6–0	2–2	3–1	1–2	0–7 (Note: The game score was 7-2 in favor of Misagh until the 18:40 minute of second half.)	3–1	6–3		3–0 (Note: The game score was 2-2 until the 15:00 minute when the Sh. Saveh players left the field to protest against the match officials.)	4–5
Sh. Saveh	5–0	1–1	6–5	4–2	2–3	2–1	5–4	1–3	0–2	4–8	4–3		2–2
Sh. Tabriz	2–2	8–2	1–2	4–2	3–5	3–2	2–2	4–6	3–2	0–3	1–2	2–2	

Updated to match(es) played on 3 March 2013. Source: Futsal Planet
Legend: Blue = home team win; Yellow = draw; Red = away team win.

== Clubs season-progress ==
	Win
	Draw
	Lose
	Bye
W/O	Withdrew

Team ╲ Round	1	2	3	4	5	6	7	8	9	10	11	12	13	14	15	16	17	18	19	20	21	22	23	24	25	26
Arjan	B	L	L	L	W	L	L	D	W	L	L	L	L	B	L	L	L	L	L	L	W	L	L	D	W	W
Dabiri Tabriz	W	L	L	W	W	W	D	D	L	D	B	D	W	W	L	L	W	W	W	W	L	W	L	B	L	D
Farsh Ara	W	L	W	W	L	L	W	W	L	W	W	B	W	L	W	L	D	L	W	L	D	L	L	W	B	L
Gaz Khozestan	L	B	L	L	L	W	L	D	L	L	L	L	L	L	B	W	L	L	D	W	L	W	L	L	L	W
Giti Pasand	W	W	W	W	B	D	D	D	W	W	W	D	W	W	L	W	W	B	W	W	W	L	W	W	W	W
Hilal Ahmar Tabriz	L	L	W	B	L	L	L	L	L	W	L	L	W	L	W	L	B	L	L	L	D	W	L	L	L	D
Melli Haffari Iran	W	W	W	D	L	W	W	D	L	D	W	D	B	W	L	L	D	D	W/O	W	L	W	L	L	W	B
Misagh Tehran	W	D	L	L	L	D	D	L	B	D	L	W	L	W	W	W	D	W	W	L	L	B	W	W	W	D
Rah Sari	L	L	W	L	W	L	W	L	W	B	L	W	W	L	L	L	L	D	D	W	L	L	B	L	L	L
Saba Qom	W	W	L	W	W	D	B	W	W	D	W	W	W	W	W	W	W	W	L	B	W	L	W	W	W	L
Shahid Mansouri	L	W	L	W	W	B	W	W	W	W	L	D	L	L	W	W	W	W	B	L	W	W	W	W	L	W
Sh. Saveh	L	W	B	L	L	D	D	D	W	L	W	D	L	W	W	B	L	L	L	L	W	L	W	L	D	W
Sh. Tabriz	L	D	W	D	W	W	L	B	L	L	W	D	L	L	L	W	D	W	W	W	B	W	W	D	D	L

== Statistics ==
=== Top goalscorers ===
Position	Player	Club	Goals
1	(Iran) Ali Asghar Hassanzadeh	Saba Qom	28
1	(Iran) Ahmad Esmaeilpour	Giti Pasand	28
3	(Iran) Alireza Vafaei	Saba Qom	27
4	(Iran) Morteza Azimaei	Rah Sari	24
5	(Iran) Mohammad Taheri	Shahid Mansouri	20
5	(Iran) Mohammad Kermani	Saba Qom	20
5	(Iran) Shahram Sharifzadeh	Hilal Ahmar	20
8	(Iran) Ghodrat Bahadori	Farsh Ara	19
9	(Iran) Mohammad Kouhestani	Saba Qom	18
9	(Iran) Moslem Rostamiha	Shahrdari Tabriz	18
11	(Iran) Mehdi Javid	Shahid Mansouri	17
11	(Iran) Hossein Tayyebi	Giti Pasand	17
13	(Iran) Mojtaba Hassan Nejad	Misagh	16
13	(Iran) Rashid Gholipour	Dabiri Tabriz	16
15	(Iran) Farhad Fakhim	Dabiri Tabriz	15
15	(Iran) Sajad Bandi Saadi	Giti Pasand	15
15	(Iran) Babak Nasiri	Shahrdari Tabriz	15
15	(Iran) Mohsen Farahmand	Misagh	15
19	(Iran) Farhad Tavakoli	Melli Haffari	14
19	(Iran) Emrahim Hajati	Farsh Ara	14
21	(Iran) Farid Namazi	Melli Haffari	13
22	(Iran) Ali Asadi	Shahrdari Saveh	12
22	(Iran) Saeid Taghizadeh	Giti Pasand	12
22	(Iran) Javad Asghari Moghaddam	Dabiri Tabriz	12
22	(Iran) Yasin Sajadi Mehr	Gaz Khozestan	12
26	(Iran) Mohammad Reza Zahmatkesh	Shahrdari Saveh	11
26	(Iran) Meysam Ilanlou	Saba Qom	11
26	(Iran) Afshin Kazemi	Giti Pasand	11
26	(Iran) Amir Raeisi	Farsh Ara	11
26	(Iran) Mojtaba Moridi Zadeh	Melli Haffari	11
26	(Iran) Majid Raeisi	Misagh	11
26	(Iran) Majid Hajibandeh	Misagh	11
26	(Iran) Taha Mortazavi	Rah Sari	11
34	4 players		10
38	4 players		9
42	10 players		8
52	6 players		7
58	9 players		6
67	6 players		5
73	9 players		4
82	18 players		3
100	19 players		2
119	17 players		1
_	2 players		OG
_	3 technical loses (3-0)		
Total goals (Including technical loses)			963
Total games			144
Average per game			6.69

Last updated: 28 July 2019

=== Cards ===
Position	Player	Club	Yellow card	Red card	Total
1	(Iran) Rashid Gholipour	Dabiri Tabriz	11	1	12
2	(Iran) Ali Kiaei	Shahid Mansouri	9	1	10
3	(Iran) Mohammad Reza Zahmatkesh	Shahrdari Saveh	7	2	9
3	(Iran) Ghodrat Bahadori	Farsh Ara	8	1	9
3	(Iran) Sadegh Loveini	Gaz Khozestan	8	1	9
6	(Iran) Mohsen Adibi	Arjan Shiraz	7	1	8
6	(Iran) Yaser Shahvand	Arjan Shiraz	7	1	8
6	(Iran) Ali Abdollahhi	Farsh Ara	7	1	8
6	(Iran) Ahmad Safari	Hilal Ahmar	7	1	8
6	(Iran) Ebrahim Hajati	Farsh Ara	8	0	8
6	(Iran) Hadi Bafandeh	Arjan Shiraz	8	0	8
6	(Iran) Yaser Ebrahimi	Rah Sari	8	0	8
13	2 players		6	1	7
15	3 players		7	0	7
18	1 player		4	2	6
19	6 players		6	0	6
25	3 players		4	1	5
28	11 players		5	0	5
39	3 players		3	1	4
42	14 players		4	0	4
56	3 players		2	1	3
59	19 players		3	0	3
78	29 players		2	0	2
106	1 player		0	1	1
107	37 players		1	0	1

Last updated: 31 August 2019

== Awards ==
Iranian Futsal Super League
2012–13 champions

First title

- Winner: Giti Pasand Isfahan
- Runners-up: Saba Qom
- Third-Place: Shahid Mansouri Gharchak
- Top scorer: (Iran) Ali Asghar Hassanzadeh (Saba Qom) – (Iran) Ahmad Esmaeilpour (Giti Pasand Isfahan) (28)

== See also ==
- 2012–13 Futsal 1st Division
- 2013 Iran Futsal's 2nd Division
- 2012–13 Persian Gulf Cup
- 2012–13 Azadegan League
- 2012–13 Iran Football's 2nd Division
- 2012–13 Iran Football's 3rd Division
- 2012–13 Hazfi Cup
- Iranian Super Cup
