= Mohammad Keshavarz =

Iranian futsal player

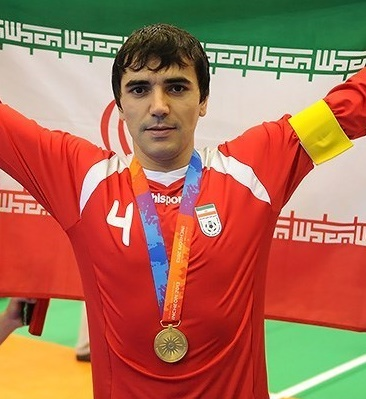

Personal information
- Full name: Mohammad Keshavarz
- Date of birth: 5 July 1982 (age 44)
- Place of birth: Ray, Iran
- Height: 1.75 m (5 ft 9 in)
- Position: Defender

Team information
- Current team: Giti Pasand (manager)

Senior career*
Years	Team	Apps	(Gls)
1997–1998	Saipa Rey (football)		
1998–1999	Daraei Rey (football)		
1999–2000	Bazyaft Tehran (football)		
2000–2002	Pasargad (football)		
2002–2003	Kowsar (football)		
2003	Shohada Basij		
2003–2006	Shensa		
2006–2009	Shahid Mansouri		
2009–2010	Foolad Mahan		
2010–2011	Shahid Mansouri		(5)
2011–2015	Giti Pasand		(25)
2015–2016	Tasisat Daryaei		(7)
2016–2020	Giti Pasand		(15)
2020–2021	Raga		(2)

International career^{‡}
2001–2005	Iran U23		
2003–2016	Iran		

Managerial career
- 2014–2015: Giti Pasand (Player-coach)
- 2020–2021: Raga (Player-coach)
- 2021–: Giti Pasand
Medal record
Representing Iran
Men's Futsal
FIFA Futsal World Cup
Bronze medal – third place	2016 Colombia
Grand Prix de Futsal
Silver medal – second place	2007 Brazil
Silver medal – second place	2009 Brazil
AFC Futsal Championship
Gold medal – first place	2004 Macau
Gold medal – first place	2007 Osaka & Amagasaki
Gold medal – first place	2008 Bangkok
Gold medal – first place	2010 Tashkent
Bronze medal – third place	2012 Dubai
Gold medal – first place	2016 Tashkent
Asian Indoor Games
Gold medal – first place	2007 Macau
Gold medal – first place	2013 Incheon
Futsal Confederations Cup
Gold medal – first place	2009 Tripoli
- * Club domestic league appearances and goals as of 21 January 2022 ‡ National team caps and goals as of 7 September 2019

Mohammad Keshavarz (Persian: محمد کشاورز; born 5 July 1982) is an Iranian professional futsal coach and former player. He is currently head coach of Giti Pasand in the Iranian Futsal Super League.

== Honours ==
=== Player ===
Country

- FIFA Futsal World Cup
  - Third place (1): 2016
- AFC Futsal Championship
  - Champion (5): 2004 – 2007 – 2008 – 2010 – 2016
- Asian Indoor and Martial Arts Games
  - Champion (2): 2007 – 2013
- Confederations Futsal Cup
  - Champion (1): 2009
- Grand Prix
  - Runner-Up (3): 2007 – 2009 – 2015
- WAFF Futsal Championship
  - Champion (2): 2007 – 2012

Club

- AFC Futsal Club Championship
  - Champion (4): 2006 (Shensa) – 2010 (Foolad Mahan) – 2012 (Giti Pasand) – 2015 (Tasisat Daryaei)
  - Runner-Up (3): 2011 (Shahid Mansouri) – 2013 (Giti Pasand) – 2017 (Giti Pasand)
- Iranian Futsal Super League
  - Champion (7): 2003–04 (Shensa) – 2005–06 (Shensa) – 2009–10 (Foolad Mahan) – 2010–11 (Shahid Mansouri) – 2012–13 (Giti Pasand) – 2015–16 (Tasisat Daryaei) – 2016–17 (Giti Pasand)
  - Runner-Up (5): 2007–08 (Shahid Mansouri) – 2011–12 (Giti Pasand) – 2013–14 (Giti Pasand) – 2014–15 (Giti Pasand) – 2018–19 (Giti Pasand)

=== Manager ===
- Iranian Futsal Super League
  - Runner-Up (1): 2014–15 (Giti Pasand)

=== Individual ===
- Best player:
  - 2011 AFC Futsal Player of the Year
  - 2011 AFC Futsal Club Championship
  - 2012 AFC Futsal Club Championship
  - 2013–14 Iranian Futsal Super League Best Defender (Giti Pasand)

== Managerial career ==
=== Statistics ===
As of 12 March 2022

Team	From	To	Record							
Team	From	To	G	W	D	L	GF	GA	+/-	Win %
Giti Pasand	2014	2015	26	14	8	4	87	60	+27	53.85
Raga	2020	2021	12	4	2	6	29	32	−3	33.33
Giti Pasand	2021	present	26	21	1	4	129	54	+75	80.77

Sporting positions
Preceded by (Iran) Mohammad Taheri	Asian Futsaler of the Year; 2011	Succeeded by (Japan) Katsutoshi Henmi
Preceded by (Iran) Vahid Shamsaei	AFC Futsal Club Championship MVP; 2011; 2012	Succeeded by (Thailand) Suphawut Thueanklang
