= Afshin Kazemi =

Iranian futsal player (born 1986)

Personal information
- Full name: Afshin Kazemi Ghezeljeh
- Date of birth: 23 November 1986 (age 39)
- Place of birth: Karaj, Iran
- Height: 1.70 m (5 ft 7 in)
- Position: Winger

Senior career*
Years	Team	Apps	(Gls)
2003–2007	Shensa		
2007–2009	Tam Iran Khodro		
2010–2015	Giti Pasand		(48)
2015–2016	Shahid Mansouri		(9)
2016–2019	Giti Pasand		(5)
2019–2021	Crop		
2022	Shahrvand		(0)

International career^{‡}
2011–	Iran		(7)
Medal record
FIFA Futsal World Cup
Bronze medal – third place	2016 Colombia
Shensa Saveh
Winner	Futsal Super League	2003–04
Winner	Futsal Super League	2005–06
Winner	Asia Futsal Cup	2006
Tam Iran Khodro
Winner	Futsal Super League	2007–08
Giti Pasand
Runner-up	Futsal Super League	2010–11
Runner-up	Futsal Super League	2011–12
Winner	AFCC	2012
- * Club domestic league appearances and goals as of 17 December 2022 ‡ National team caps and goals as of 10 August 2018

Afshin Kazemi Ghezeljeh (Persian: افشین کاظمی قزلجه; born 23 November 1986) is an Iranian professional futsal player.

== Honours ==
=== Country ===
- FIFA Futsal World Cup
  - Third place (1): 2016

=== Club ===
- AFC Futsal Club Championship
  - Champions (2): 2006 (Shensa) – 2012 (Giti Pasand)
  - Runner-Up (1): 2013 (Giti Pasand)
- Iranian Futsal Super League
  - Champion (5): 2003–04 (Shensa) – 2005–06 (Shensa) – 2007–08 (Tam Iran Khodro) – 2012–13 (Giti Pasand) – 2016–17 (Giti Pasand)
  - Runner-Up (4): 2010–11 (Giti Pasand) – 2011–12 (Giti Pasand) – 2013–14 (Giti Pasand) – 2014–15 (Giti Pasand)

== International goals ==
#	Date	Venue	Opponent	Score	Result	Competition
1	26 February 2011	(Iran) Pirouzi Arena, Esfahan	Brazil	2–1	2–3	Friendly
2	18 September 2012	(Iran) Pirouzi Arena, Esfahan	Russia	2–3	3–3	Friendly
3	5 November 2012	(Thailand) Hua Mark Indoor Stadium, Bangkok	Morocco	2–1	2–1	2012 FIFA Futsal World Cup
4	8 November 2012	(Thailand) Hua Mark Indoor Stadium, Bangkok	Panama	2–1	4–3	2012 FIFA Futsal World Cup
5	18 December 2015	(China) Changshu Sports Center, Changshu	Myanmar	?? – ??	15–2	Changshu International Tournament
6	20 December 2015	(China) Changshu Sports Center, Changshu	China	?? – ??	3–3	Changshu International Tournament
–	1 June 2016	Iran National Futsal Camp, Tehran	Balan Sanat Fars	3–3	3–6	Unofficial friendly
7	21 September 2016	(Colombia) Coliseo Bicentenario, Bucaramanga	Brazil	2–3	4 (3) – 4 (2)	2016 FIFA Futsal World Cup
8	1 October 2016	(Colombia) Coliseo El Pueblo, Cali	Portugal	1–2	2 (4) – 2 (3)	2016 FIFA Futsal World Cup
