= Ebrahim Masoudi =

Iranian futsal player (born 1982)

Personal information
- Full name: Ebrahim Masoudi Karijani
- Date of birth: 16 August 1982 (age 44)
- Place of birth: Karaj, Iran
- Height: 1.75 m (5 ft 9 in)

Senior career*
Years	Team	Apps	(Gls)
2004–2005	Persepolis		(17)
2005–2008	Shensa		(44)
2008–2009	Tam Iran Khodro		(21)
2009–2010	Petroshimi		(25)
2010–2012	Giti Pasand		(4)
2012–2013	Tasisat Daryaei		
2013–2014	Misagh		
2014–2015	Bank Resalat		
2015	Lija Athletic		
2016–2017	Yasin Pishro		
2017	Moghavemat Alborz		
2019–2020	Parsian		

International career^{‡}
- Iran
- * Club domestic league appearances and goals as of 21 January 2022 ‡ National team caps and goals as of 28 December 2013

Ebrahim Masoudi Karijani (Persian: ابراهیم مسعودی کاریجانی; born 16 August 1982) is an Iranian professional futsal player.

== Honours ==
=== Country ===
- Asian Indoor Games
  - Champion (1): 2007
- Grand Prix
  - Runner-Up (1): 2009
- WAFF Futsal Championship
  - Champion (1): 2007

=== Club ===
- Iranian Futsal Super League
  - Champion (1): 2005–06 (Shensa)
  - Runner-Up (2): 2010–11 (Giti Pasand) – 2011–12 (Giti Pasand)
- Golden CUP
  - Champion (1): 2007 (Shensa)

=== Individual ===
- Offensive fastest goal in World Cup 2008 Brazil
