= Mostafa Nazari =

Iranian futsal player (born 1982)

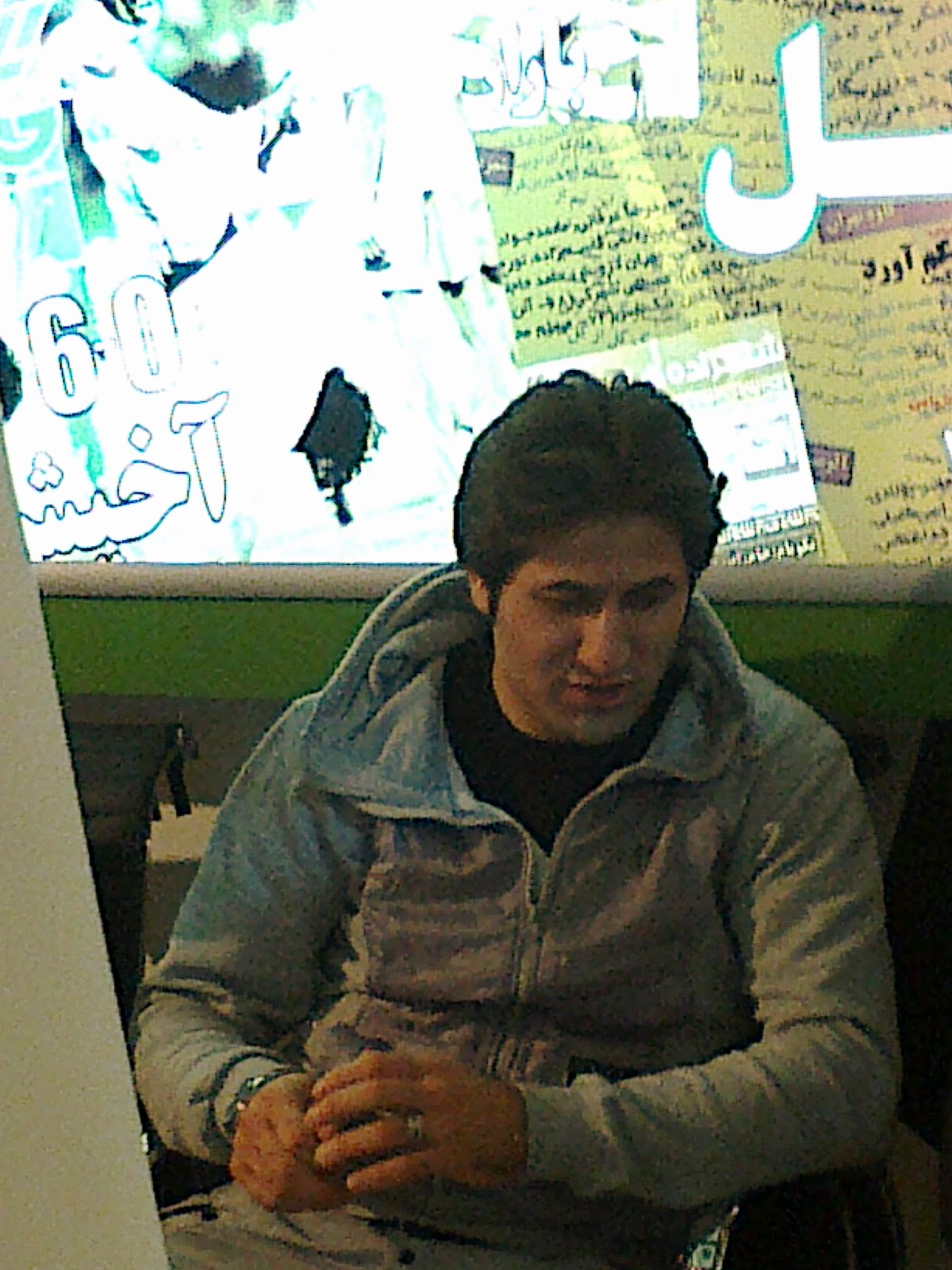

Personal information
- Date of birth: 11 December 1982 (age 43)
- Place of birth: Tehran, Iran
- Height: 5 ft 10 in (1.78 m)
- Position: Goalkeeper

Youth career
- 1997–1998: Shariati (football)
- 1998: Persepolis (football)
- 1998–1999: Etka (football)
- 1999–2001: Abfa (football)
- 2001–2002: Esteghlal (football)

Senior career*
Years	Team	Apps	(Gls)
2002–2004	Shohada Basij		
2004–2005	Chini Hamgam		
2005–2007	Shensa		
2007–2009	Eram Kish		
2009–2010	Foolad Mahan		
2010–2012	Giti Pasand		(0)
2012–2013	Dabiri		
2013–2014	Norilsk Nickel		
2014–2018	Tasisat Daryaei		
2018–2019	Vamos Mataram		
2019–2020	Sunich		(0)
2020–2021	Crop		(0)

International career
2002–2004	Iran U23		
2004–2018	Iran		

Managerial career
- 2022: Iran (goalkeeping coach)
Medal record
Representing Iran
Men's Futsal as player
Grand Prix de Futsal
Silver medal – second place	2009 Brazil
Silver medal – second place	2015 Brazil
AFC Futsal Championship
Gold medal – first place	2008 Bangkok
Gold medal – first place	2010 Tashkent
Gold medal – first place	2016 Tashkent
Gold medal – first place	2018 Chinese Taipei
Silver medal – second place	2014 Ho Chi Minh City
Bronze medal – third place	2012 Dubai
Asian Indoor Games
Gold medal – first place	2007 Macau
Gold medal – first place	2009 Ho Chi Minh City
Gold medal – first place	2013 Incheon
Futsal Confederations Cup
Gold medal – first place	2009 Tripoli
- * Club domestic league appearances and goals

Mostafa Nazari (Persian: مصطفی نظری; born 11 December 1982) is an Iranian professional futsal coach and former player. Nazari was selected as the best futsal goalkeeper in the world in 2010.

== Honours ==
=== Country ===
- AFC Futsal Championship
  - Champions (3): 2007 - 2008 - 2010
- Asian Indoor Games
  - Champion (2): 2005 - 2007
- Confederations Cup
  - Champion (1): 2009
- WAFF Futsal Championship
  - Champion (1): 2012

=== Club ===
- AFC Futsal Club Championship
  - Champion (3): 2006 (Shensa) - 2010 (Foolad Mahan) - 2015 (Tasisat Daryaei)
- Iranian Futsal Super League
  - Champion (4): 2005–06 (Shensa) - 2009–10 (Foolad Mahan) - 2014–15 (Tasisat Daryaei) - 2015–16 (Tasisat Daryaei)
  - Runner-Up (4): 2008–09 (Eram Kish), 2010–11 (Giti Pasand) - 2011–12 (Giti Pasand) - 2017–18 (Tasisat Daryaei)
- Indonesia Pro Futsal League
  - Champions (1): 2019 (Vamos Mataram)

=== Individual ===
- Best player:
  - Best futsal goalkeeper of the Iran in 2007–08.
  - Best futsal goalkeeper of the world in 2010.
  - Best futsal goalkeeper of the 2012 WAFF Futsal Championship
  - Best futsal goalkeeper of the 2014–15 Iranian Futsal Super League
