= 2007 WAFF Futsal Championship =

Tournament details
- Host country: Iran
- Dates: 16–18 October
- Teams: 4
- Venue(s): 1 (in 1 host city)

Final positions
- Champions: Iran U-23 (1st title)
- Runners-up: Lebanon
- Third place: Iraq
- Fourth place: Jordan

Tournament statistics
- Matches played: 6
- Goals scored: 46 (7.67 per match)

West Asian Championship (Men) 2007 (Iran)

== Final table ==
All matches in Amol.

Team	Pts	Pld	W	D	L	GF	GA	GD
Iran U-23	9	3	3	0	0	21	4	+17
Lebanon	6	3	2	0	1	12	9	+3
Iraq	1	3	0	1	2	7	12	−5
Jordan	1	3	0	1	2	6	21	−15

== Matches and results ==
16 October 2007
15:00

Lebanon	5 – 2	Iraq

Payambar Azam Arena, Amol
Referee: Mamhoud Reza Nasirloo (Iran)

16 October 2007
18:45

U-23 Iran	12 – 1	Jordan
M. Daneshvar 4 M. Latifi 2 A. Hassanzadeh 2 E. Masoudi; A. Kiaei; M. Taheri; A. Mollaali

Payambar Azam Arena, Amol

17 October 2007
16:30

Jordan	3 – 7	Lebanon

Payambar Azam Arena, Amol

17 October 2007
18:30

U-23 Iran	5 – 3	Iraq
E. Masoudi 11'; M. Keshavarz 17'; M. Tayyebi 26'; M. Taheri 28'; M. Daneshvar 29'		H. Abdoli 19', 47'; H. Khaled 22'

Payambar Azam Arena, Amol

18 October 2007
16:30

Jordan	2 – 2	Iraq

Payambar Azam Arena, Amol

18 October 2007
18:30

Lebanon	0 – 4	Iran U-23
		M. Daneshvar 19'; A. Hassanzadeh 27'; M. Taheri 30'; E. Masoudi 34'

Payambar Azam Arena, Amol
Referee: Mamhoud Reza Nasirloo (Iran)

== Winner ==
2007 WAFF Futsal Championship winners

Iran
First title
