= Ahmad Esmaeilpour =

Iranian futsal player

Personal information
- Full name: Ahmad Esmaeilpour
- Date of birth: 8 September 1988 (age 38)
- Place of birth: Saveh, Iran
- Height: 1.86 m (6 ft 1 in)
- Position: Right winger

Team information
- Current team: Shenzhen Nanling Tielang
- Number: 5

Youth career
- 2000–2004: Mahfel Ons Ba Qoran Saveh
- 2004–2006: Saveh Shen

Senior career*
Years	Team	Apps	(Gls)
2006–2008	Saveh Shen		
2008–2009	Zar Sim		
2009–2010	Foolad Mahan		(1)
2010–2012	Shahid Mansouri	46	(49)
2012–2018	Giti Pasand		(136)
2015	→ Shenzhen Nanling (loan)	2	(1)
2018–2019	Qingdao Impulse Chenxi	23	(64)
2019–	Shenzhen Nanling		

International career^{‡}
2008–2012	Iran U23	10	(9)
2010–2022	Iran		(46)
Medal record
Representing Iran
Men's Futsal as player
FIFA Futsal World Cup
Bronze medal – third place	2016 Colombia
Grand Prix de Futsal
Silver medal – second place	2015 Brazil
AFC Futsal Championship
Gold medal – first place	2018 Chinese Taipei
Silver medal – second place	2014 Ho Chi Minh City
Bronze medal – third place	2012 Dubai
Asian Indoor Games
Gold medal – first place	2009 Ho Chi Minh City
Gold medal – first place	2017 Ashgabat
- * Club domestic league appearances and goals as of 17 January 2022 ‡ National team caps and goals as of 19 April 2022

Ahmad Esmaeilpour (Persian: احمد اسماعیل‌پور; born 8 September 1988) is an Iranian professional futsal player. He plays in the position of Right Winger and is currently a member of Shenzhen Nanling Tielang in the Chinese Futsal League and the Iran national futsal team.

Esmaeilpour was part of the Iranian team for the 2016 FIFA Futsal World Cup who finished third place after defeating Portugal in penalties. Esmaeilpour scored four goals throughout the tournament and won the Bronze Ball which is given to the third best player of the tournament.

== Awards and honours ==
=== Country ===
- FIFA Futsal World Cup
  - Third place (1): 2016
- AFC Futsal Championship
  - Champion (1): 2018
  - Runners-up (1): 2014
  - Third place (1): 2012
- Asian Indoor Games
  - Champion (2): 2009 - 2017
- WAFF Futsal Championship
  - Champion (1): 2012
- Grand Prix
  - Runner-Up (1): 2015

=== Club ===
- AFC Futsal Club Championship
  - Champions (2): 2010 (Foolad Mahan) - 2012 (Giti Pasand)
  - Runner-Up (3): 2011 (Shahid Mansouri) - 2013 (Giti Pasand) - 2017 (Giti Pasand)
- Iranian Futsal Super League
  - Champions (5): 2009–10 (Foolad Mahan) - 2010–11 (Shahid Mansouri) - 2011–12 (Shahid Mansouri) - 2012–13 (Giti Pasand) - 2016–17 (Giti Pasand)
  - Runners-up (2): 2013–14 (Giti Pasand) - 2014–15 (Giti Pasand)

=== Individual ===
- Top Goalscorer:
  - AFC Futsal Club Championship: 2012 (Giti Pasand) (9 goals)
  - Iranian Futsal Super League: 2011–12 (Shahid Mansouri) (32 goals) - 2012–13 (Giti Pasand) (28 goals)
  - Chinese Futsal League: 2018–19 (Qingdao Impulse Chenxi) (64 goals)
- Best Player:
  - Best Winger: 2013–14 Iranian Futsal Super League (Giti Pasand)
- Bronze Ball:
  - 2016 FIFA Futsal World Cup

== International goals ==
#	Date	Venue	Opponent	Score	Result	Competition
1	17 April 2012	Bandar Abbas, Iran	Uzbekistan	2–1	4–1	Friendly
2	27 April 2012	(Iran) Ghadir Arena, Urmia	Kuwait	6–2	9–2	2012 WAFF Futsal Championship
3	29 April 2012	(Iran) Ghadir Arena, Urmia	Palestine	8–0	19–1	2012 WAFF Futsal Championship
4	1 May 2012	(Iran) Ghadir Arena, Urmia	Iraq	3–1	7–3	2012 WAFF Futsal Championship
5	1 May 2012	(Iran) Ghadir Arena, Urmia	Iraq	4–1	7–3	2012 WAFF Futsal Championship
6	2 May 2012	(Iran) Ghadir Arena, Urmia	Jordan	1–0	5–0	2012 WAFF Futsal Championship
7	2 May 2012	(Iran) Ghadir Arena, Urmia	Jordan	2–0	5–0	2012 WAFF Futsal Championship
8	12 May 2012	(China) Zhejiang Dragon Sports Centre, Hangzhou	China	1–0	3–1	Friendly
9	25 May 2012	(United Arab Emirates) Al-Shabab Stadium, Dubai	South Korea	1–0	14–1	2012 AFC Futsal Championship
10	29 May 2012	(United Arab Emirates) Al-Shabab Stadium, Dubai	Uzbekistan	2–0	6–3	2012 AFC Futsal Championship
11	8 November 2012	(Thailand) Hua Mark Indoor Stadium, Bangkok	Panama	1–0	4–3	2012 FIFA Futsal World Cup
12	2 December 2013	(Iran) Shahediyeh Arena, Yazd	Russia	5–3	6–3	Friendly
13	20 April 2014	(Uzbekistan) Sports Center, Tashkent	Uzbekistan	5–2	6–2	Friendly
-	29 April 2014	(Vietnam) Ho Chi Minh City	South Korea	?–0	5–0	Unofficial Friendly
-	29 April 2014	(Vietnam) Ho Chi Minh City	South Korea	?–0	5–0	Unofficial Friendly
14	4 May 2014	(Vietnam) Phu Tho Gymnasium, Ho Chi Minh City	Australia	7–1	8–1	2014 AFC Futsal Championship
15	8 May 2014	(Vietnam) Phu Tho Gymnasium, Ho Chi Minh City	Uzbekistan	4–0	10–0	2014 AFC Futsal Championship
16	14 November 2014	(Brazil) Ginásio Poliesportivo Adib Moysés Dib, São Bernardo do Campo	Costa Rica	1–0	5–1	2014 Grand Prix de Futsal
17	14 November 2014	(Brazil) Ginásio Poliesportivo Adib Moysés Dib, São Bernardo do Campo	Costa Rica	5–1	5–1	2014 Grand Prix de Futsal
18	11 February 2015	(Slovenia) Športno društvo Tri lilije, Laško	Slovenia	1–0	2–1	Friendly
19	11 October 2015	(Iran) Ghadir Arena, Urmia	Russia	2–1	2–2	Friendly
20	5 November 2015	(Brazil) Centro Olímpico Engenheiro Wagner do Nascimento, Uberaba	Angola	?–0	7–0	2015 Grand Prix de Futsal
21	21 August 2016	(Thailand) Bangkok Arena, Bangkok	Thailand	1–0	5–7	2016 Thailand Five's
22	18 September 2016	(Colombia) Coliseo Iván de Beodut, Medellín	Azerbaijan	1–0	3–3	2016 FIFA Futsal World Cup
23	24 September 2016	(Colombia) Coliseo Bicentenario, Bucaramanga	Paraguay	1–1	4–3	2016 FIFA Futsal World Cup
24	24 September 2016	(Colombia) Coliseo Bicentenario, Bucaramanga	Paraguay	4–3	4–3	2016 FIFA Futsal World Cup
25	27 September 2016	(Colombia) Coliseo Iván de Beodut, Medellín	Russia	1–1	3–4	2016 FIFA Futsal World Cup
26	18 September 2017	(Turkmenistan) Ice Palace Hall 2, Ashgabat	Tahiti	2–0	16–1	2017 Asian Indoor Games
27	18 September 2017	(Turkmenistan) Ice Palace Hall 2, Ashgabat	Tahiti	3–0	16–1	2017 Asian Indoor Games
28	18 September 2017	(Turkmenistan) Ice Palace Hall 2, Ashgabat	Tahiti	8–0	16–1	2017 Asian Indoor Games
29	19 September 2017	(Turkmenistan) Ice Palace Hall 2, Ashgabat	Jordan	1–0	7–3	2017 Asian Indoor Games
30	19 September 2017	(Turkmenistan) Ice Palace Hall 2, Ashgabat	Jordan	5–0	7–3	2017 Asian Indoor Games
31	23 September 2017	(Turkmenistan) Ice Palace Hall 1, Ashgabat	Thailand	3–2	10–4	2017 Asian Indoor Games
32	24 September 2017	(Turkmenistan) Ice Palace Hall 1, Ashgabat	Afghanistan	1–0	8–2	2017 Asian Indoor Games
33	4 December 2017	(Iran) 25 Aban Arena, Isfahan	Kazakhstan	2–1	2–1	Isfahan 2017
34	14 January 2018	(Iran) Handball Federation Arena, Tehran	Belarus	1–0	5–0	Friendly
35	15 January 2018	(Iran) Handball Federation Arena, Tehran	Belarus	1–0	2–1	Friendly
36	4 February 2018	(Taiwan) University of Taipei Gymnasium, Taipei	China	9–1	11–1	2018 AFC Futsal Championship
37	8 February 2018	(Taiwan) Xinzhuang Gymnasium, New Taipei City	Thailand	1–0	9–1	2018 AFC Futsal Championship
38	8 February 2018	(Taiwan) Xinzhuang Gymnasium, New Taipei City	Thailand	2–0	9–1	2018 AFC Futsal Championship

Sporting positions
Preceded by (Iran) Ali Asghar Hassanzadeh	AFC Futsal Club Championship Top Scorers; 2012 (9 Goals)	Succeeded by (Japan) Kaoru Morioka
Preceded by (Iran) Masoud Daneshvar	Iranian Futsal Super League top scorer 11-12 (32 Goals); 12-13 (28 Goals) with Ali Asghar Hassanzadeh	Succeeded by (Iran) Farhad Fakhim
