= Reza Naseri =

Iranian footballer (born 1975)

Personal information
- Date of birth: 16 September 1975 (age 51)
- Position: Goalkeeper

Youth career
- Shariyati (football)
- Esteghlal (football)
- Fath (football)
- PAS Tehran (football)
- Pars Khodro (football)
- Malavan (football)

Senior career*
Years	Team	Apps	(Gls)
- Malavan (football)
- Niro Daryaei (football)
- Part Sazan Mashhad (football)
–2004	Esteghlal		
2004–2005	Persepolis		
2005–2009	Tam Iran Khodro		
2009–2010	Shahid Mansouri		
2010–2011	Foolad Mahan		
2011–2013	Shahrdari Saveh		

International career^{‡}
- Iran U17
- Iran U20
2000–2006	Iran		

Managerial career
- 2014–2016: Tasisat Daryaei (technical manager)
- 2017–2018: Tasisat Daryaei
- * Club domestic league appearances and goals as of 20:08, 26 April 2020 (UTC) ‡ National team caps and goals as of 20:08, 26 April 2020 (UTC)

Reza Naseri (Persian: رضا ناصری, born 16 September 1975) who was also known as Reza Nasseri is a football and futsal player, futsal coach, expert and sports presenter from Iran. He is also referred to as "the defender of Iran's national futsal team".

== Early life ==
Reza Naseri is a former player of the Iranian national football and futsal team, and a futsal coach. During his career as a player, Naseri was known as "the defender of Iran's national futsal team". During his career as a player in Iran's premier soccer and futsal leagues, he was on the field as a goalkeeper. He started his coaching career with the Futsal Tasisat Daryaei FSC. Reza Naseri works as an expert and sports presenter in Iran Broadcasting.

== Honors ==
=== Country ===
- AFC Futsal Championship
  - Champions (5): 2001 - 2002 - 2003 - 2004 - 2005
- Asian Indoor Games
  - Champion (1): 2005

=== Club ===
- Iranian Futsal Super League
  - Champion (1): 2007–08 (Tam Iran Khodro)
  - Runner-Up (2): 2005–06 (Tam Iran Khodro) - 2009–10 (Shahid Mansouri)

=== Individual ===
- Best player:
  - Best futsal goalkeeper of the Iran in 2007–08.
  - Member of Iran national U-17 Football and Futsal (Captain)
  - Member of Iran national Youth Team Football
  - Member of Iran Army National Team (Football)
  - Member of Esteglal F.C. in Asia Champion Cup
  - Head coach of Tasisat Daryaei FSC
  - Technical Manager of Tasisat Daryaei FSC Futsal Club in Asia Championship
  - CEO of Arash Club
  - Manager of Isargaran-e-Shohada Club
  - Sport Expert and TV host in many Sport programs
  - Member of Tam Iran Khodro Club in Club World Cup
