= 2011–12 Iranian Futsal Super League =

Iranian Futsal Super League
- Season: 2011–12
- Champions: Shahid Mansouri Gharchak
- Relegated: Dabiri Tabriz; Rah Sari
- Matches: 182
- Goals: 1,087 (5.97 per match)
- Top goalscorer: 32 Goals; Ahmad Esmaeilpour
- Biggest home win: Mahan 13–2 Dabiri
- Biggest away win: Misagh 0–8 Firooz Sofeh
- Highest scoring: Mahan 13–2 Dabiri
- Longest winning run: 9 games Shahid Mansouri
- Longest unbeaten run: 17 games Shahid Mansouri
- Longest winless run: 13 games Dabiri Tabriz
- Longest losing run: 10 games Dabiri Tabriz

The 2011–12 Iranian Futsal Super League was the 13th season of the Iran Pro League and the 8th under the name Futsal Super League. Shahid Mansouri Gharchak are the defending champions. The regular season, played from 30 August 2011.

== Teams ==
Locations of clubs in 2011–12 Iranian Futsal Super League

Team	City	Venue	Capacity	Head coach	Team captain	Past Season
Arjan	Shiraz	Shahid Abolfathi	–	(Iran) Vahid Nematollahi	–	6th
Dabiri	Tabriz	Oloum Pezeshki	2,000	(Iran) Hasan Ali Shiri	(Iran) Jabbar Ebrahimi	11th
Farsh Ara^{1}	Mashhad	Shahid Beheshti	6,000	(Iran) Majid Mortezaei	(Iran) Naser Ajam	7th
Firooz Sofeh	Isfahan	Pirouzi	4,300	(Iran) Mahmoud Khorakchi	–	4th
Foolad Mahan	Isfahan	Pirouzi	4,300	(Iran) Hossein Afzali	(Iran) Javad Asghari Moghaddam	3rd
Giti Pasand	Isfahan	Pirouzi	4,300	(Iran) Alireza Afzal	(Iran) Mostafa Nazari	2nd
Gostaresh Foolad	Tabriz	Shahid Pour Sharifi	6,000	(Iran) Mir Masoum Sohrabi	(Iran) Majid Zareei	5th
Misagh	Tehran	Shahrdari Mantagheh 11	300	(Iran) Reza Zarkhanli	–	Promoted
Melli Haffari Iran	Ahvaz	Naft	1,000	(Iran) Mehdi Abtahi	–	8th
Persepolis	Tehran	Khorshid	–	(Iran) Mohammad Reza Heidarian	(Iran) Mohammad Reza Heidarian	12th
Rah	Sari	Sayed Rasoul Hosseini	5,000	(Iran) Alireza Radi	(Iran) Mahmoud Lotfi	9th
Saba	Qom	Shahid Heidarian	2,000	(Iran) Hossein Ganjian	(Iran) Vahid Ghiasi	Replaced for Kish Air
Shahid Mansouri	Gharchak	7th Tir	3,000	(Iran) Reza Lak Aliabadi	(Iran) Hamid Nasiri	Champion
Shahrdari	Saveh	Fajr-e Felestin	2,500	(Iran) Reza Oghabi	(Iran) Reza Nasseri	Promoted

- ^{1} In December 2011 Elmo Adab terminated their sports activities due to financial problems. Farsh Ara (Ara Carpet Company) owned by Gholam Ali Mortezaei took over their license.

== Managerial changes ==
=== Before the start of the season ===
Team	Outgoing head coach	Manner of departure	Date of vacancy	Position in table	Incoming head coach	Date of appointment
Firooz Sofeh	(Iran) Alireza Afzal	Contract expired	17 February 2011	Pre-season	(Iran) Reza Kordi	5 July 2011
Giti Pasand	(Iran) Mehdi Abtahi	Contract expired	17 February 2011	Pre-season	(Iran) Alireza Afzal	25 April 2011
Gostaresh Foolad	(Iran) Mahmoud Khorakchi	Contract expired	17 February 2011	Pre-season	(Iran) Mir Masoum Sohrabi	12 May 2011
Firooz Sofeh	(Iran) Reza Kordi	Resigned	9 July 2011	Pre-season	(Iran) Mohammad Nazemasharieh	12 July 2011
Firooz Sofeh	(Iran) Mohammad Nazemasharieh	Resigned	25 July 2011	Pre-season	(Iran) Ahmad Baghbanbashi	28 July 2011
Melli Haffari Iran	(Iran) Mohammad Reza Davoudinejad	Contract expired	17 February 2011	Pre-season	(Iran) Mehdi Abtahi	9 August 2011

=== In season ===
Team	Outgoing head coach	Manner of departure	Date of vacancy	Position in table	Incoming head coach	Date of appointment
Persepolis	(Iran) Mohammad Reza Heidarian	Sacked	5 September 2011	14	(Iran) Reza Kordi	5 September 2011
Persepolis	(Iran) Reza Kordi	Resigned	11 October 2011	12	(Iran) Mohammad Reza Heidarian	20 October 2011
Dabiri Tabriz	(Iran) Naser Rahnama Helali	Sacked	24 October 2011	14	(Iran) Hasan Ali Shiri	24 October 2011
Rah Sari	(Iran) Mostafa Azari	Resigned	21 November 2011	11	(Iran) Alireza Radi	14 Des 2011
Firooz Sofeh	(Iran) Ahmad Baghbanbashi	Sacked	02 Des 2011	8	(Iran) Mahmoud Khorakchi	02 Des 2011
Farsh Ara	(Iran) Hamid Shandizi Moghaddam	Resigned	09 Des 2011	11	(Iran) Reza Kordi	23 Des 2011
Saba Qom	(Iran) Mehdi Ghiasi	Sacked	17 Des 2011	4	(Iran) Hossein Ganjian	18 Des 2011
Farsh Ara	(Iran) Reza Kordi	Resigned	4 January 2012	10	(Iran) Majid Mortezaei	4 January 2012
Misagh	(Iran) Reza Zarkhanli	Sacked	January 2012	12	(Iran) Amir Shamsaei	January 2012
Misagh	(Iran) Amir Shamsaei	Resigned	February 2012	12	(Iran) Reza Zarkhanli	February 2012

== League standings ==
Pos	Team	Pld	W	D	L	GF	GA	GD	Pts	Qualification
1	Shahid Mansouri (C)	26	21	2	3	114	56	+58	65	
2	Giti Pasand	26	20	5	1	101	42	+59	59 (Note: Persepolis and Giti Pasand were deducted 6 points in 2011–12 season issued by Iranian Football Federation.)	AFC Futsal Club Championship
3	Foolad Mahan	26	16	6	4	116	70	+46	54	
4	Melli Haffari Iran	26	13	6	7	95	77	+18	45	
5	Gostaresh Foolad	26	12	4	10	67	67	0	40	
6	Saba Qom	26	12	3	11	83	81	+2	39	
7	Firooz Sofeh	26	11	5	10	76	72	+4	38	
8	Farsh Ara	26	8	6	12	58	73	−15	30	
9	Sh. Saveh	26	7	7	12	54	66	−12	28	
10	Arjan	26	8	3	15	74	94	−20	27	
11	Persepolis	26	10	3	13	83	110	−27	27	
12	Misagh Tehran	26	7	3	16	47	86	−39	24	
13	Rah Sari	26	5	5	16	61	85	−24	20	
14	Dabiri Tabriz	26	3	2	21	58	108	−50	11	

Updated to match(es) played on 23 June 2012. Source: Futsal Planet (in English)
Rules for classification: 1) points; 2) goal difference; 3) number of goals scored.
(C) Champions

== Positions by round ==
Team ╲ Round	1	2	3	4	5	6	7	8	9	10	11	12	13	14	15	16	17	18	19	20	21	22	23	24	25	26
Shahid Mansouri	6	1	2	5	3	5	4	4	4	2	2	2	2	2	2	2	1	1	1	1	1	1	1	1	1	1
Giti Pasand	1	2	3	1	1	1	1	1	1	1	1	1	1	1	1	1	2	2	2	2	2	2	2	2	2	2
Foolad Mahan	7	3	1	2	2	2	2	2	3	3	3	3	3	3	3	3	3	3	3	3	3	3	3	3	3	3
Melli Haffari Iran	3	4	4	3	5	4	5	5	6	6	6	6	6	6	6	6	5	4	5	6	4	4	4	4	4	4
Gostaresh Foolad	4	5	5	6	7	7	6	6	5	5	5	5	5	5	5	5	6	5	6	5	6	5	5	5	5	5
Saba Qom	2	6	6	4	4	3	3	3	2	4	4	4	4	4	4	4	4	6	4	4	5	6	6	6	7	6
Firooz Sofeh	14	10	11	8	9	10	8	8	8	7	8	10	8	9	7	8	7	7	8	7	7	7	7	7	6	7
Farsh Ara	10	13	10	11	8	8	9	10	7	9	7	7	9	11	10	11	10	8	7	9	9	8	8	8	8	8
Sh. Saveh	13	9	9	10	13	11	11	9	9	8	9	12	10	10	12	10	9	11	11	11	11	11	10	9	10	9
Persepolis	12	14	14	13	11	13	12	13	11	10	10	8	11	7	8	7	8	10	10	8	8	9	9	10	9	10
Arjan	5	8	8	7	6	6	7	7	10	11	12	13	13	12	11	12	12	9	9	10	10	10	11	11	11	11
Misagh Tehran	11	11	12	12	10	9	10	12	12	13	11	9	7	8	9	9	11	12	12	12	12	12	12	12	12	12
Rah Sari	8	7	7	9	12	12	13	11	13	12	13	11	12	13	13	13	13	13	13	13	13	13	13	13	13	13
Dabiri Tabriz	9	12	13	14	14	14	14	14	14	14	14	14	14	14	14	14	14	14	14	14	14	14	14	14	14	14

Leader
Relegation to the 2012–13 Iran Futsal's 1st Division

== Results table ==
Home \ Away	ARJ	DAB	ARA	FSO	MAH	SGP	GFT	MIS	HFR	PRS	RAS	SAB	MAN	SHS
Arjan		4–3	2–2	2–2	4–8	2–5	1–2	3–1	4–1	4–6	4–4	6–2	2–6	4–2
Dabiri Tabriz	1–5		2–3	3–5	1–5	1–7	4–6	2–4	1–4	2–3	4–2	3–4	2–3	3–4
Farsh Ara	4–1	3–2		2–2	2–2	1–4	1–2	2–1	3–3	4–3	5–3	3–3	2–3	3–2
Firooz Sofeh	4–1	2–2	2–1		3–1	1–2	3–3	4–1	4–3	7–3	5–3	2–1	3–4	2–0
Foolad Mahan	4–3	13–2	4–0	9–3		4–4	4–1	8–1	4–5	4–3	2–1	3–2	3–7	4–4
Giti Pasand	4–1	3–2	2–0	8–2	2–2		1–0	4–2	9–4	11–2	6–1	2–1	5–2	1–0
Gostaresh Foolad	6–2	0–2	4–1	6–4	2–4	0–7		5–3	1–1	4–1	4–0	6–3	1–1	0–1
Misagh Tehran	3–4	3–3	2–4	0–8	4–2	1–2	2–0		3–2	3–1	1–0	3–5	4–3	0–0
Melli Haffari Iran	1–0	3–2	5–3	3–2	3–3	4–4	2–3	5–1		5–5	5–1	2–4	6–3	4–0
Persepolis	4–3	3–4	2–1	4–2	3–7	1–2	6–3	4–1	4–7		6–4	5–1	3–8	2–2
Rah Sari	4–6	5–2	3–0	2–2	3–4	1–1	4–4	0–0	2–4	5–4		3–4	3–5	3–0
Saba Qom	5–2	4–3	8–4	1–3	4–4	1–2	3–1	7–3	2–6	6–2	2–0		4–4	1–3
Shahid Mansouri	6–3	8–2	3–1	2–1	2–1	3–0	4–0 (Note: The game score was 4–2 in favor of Shahid Mansuri until the 9:30-minute of second half when the Gostaresh Foolad players left the field to protest against the match officials.)	5–1	6–4	8–1	4–1	3–0		7–1
Sh. Saveh	4–1	3–0	3–3	3–0	3–5	3–3	2–3	3–0	3–3	2–2	1–3	3–5	2–4	

Updated to match(es) played on 9 March 2012. Source: Futsal Planet
Legend: Blue = home team win; Yellow = draw; Red = away team win.

== Clubs season-progress ==
Team ╲ Round	1	2	3	4	5	6	7	8	9	10	11	12	13	14	15	16	17	18	19	20	21	22	23	24	25	26
Arjan	W	L	L	W	W	L	L	L	L	L	L	L	L	W	W	L	D	W	W	L	L	W	L	D	L	D
Dabiri Tabriz	L	L	L	L	L	L	L	L	L	L	D	L	L	W	W	L	L	L	L	L	L	L	W	L	D	L
Farsh Ara	L	L	W	L	W	D	L	L	W	L	W	L	D	L	D	L	D	W	W	L	W	W	D	D	L	L
Firooz Sofeh	L	W	L	W	L	L	W	L	D	D	D	L	W	L	W	L	D	W	L	W	W	L	W	W	W	D
Foolad Mahan	W	W	W	W	D	W	W	W	D	D	D	W	L	W	D	W	W	L	W	W	L	D	W	W	W	L
Giti Pasand	W	W	W	W	W	W	W	W	D	W	L	W	W	W	W	D	W	D	W	D	W	D	W	W	W	W
Gostaresh Foolad	W	D	W	L	L	D	W	W	D	W	W	L	W	L	W	W	L	W	L	W	L	W	L	L	L	D
Melli Haffari Iran	W	D	W	W	D	W	L	L	L	W	W	W	L	D	L	W	W	W	L	D	W	W	D	D	L	W
Misagh Tehran	L	L	L	W	L	W	L	L	D	L	W	W	W	L	L	L	L	L	L	L	W	L	W	D	D	L
Persepolis	L	L	L	L	W	L	D	L	W	W	L	W	L	W	L	W	L	L	W	D	W	L	L	D	W	L
Rah Sari	L	W	L	L	L	L	L	W	L	D	L	W	L	L	L	L	D	D	L	L	L	W	L	D	W	D
Saba Qom	W	L	W	W	W	W	W	W	W	L	D	D	D	L	L	W	L	L	W	W	L	L	L	L	L	W
Shahid Mansouri	W	W	W	L	W	D	W	W	W	W	W	D	W	W	W	W	W	W	W	W	W	L	W	L	W	W
Sh. Saveh	L	W	L	L	L	D	D	W	D	D	L	L	W	D	L	D	W	L	L	D	L	W	L	W	L	W

W = Win; D = Draw; L = Lose

== Top Goalscorers ==
Position	Player	Club	Goals
1	(Iran) Ahmad Esmaeilpour	Shahid Mansouri	32
2	(Iran) Nasrollah Momen	Persepolis	28
3	(Iran) Mohammad Taheri	Foolad Mahan	22
3	(Iran) Babak Sohrabi	Arjan Shiraz	22
5	(Iran) Mohammad Kouhestani	Saba Qom	21
6	(Iran) Ghodrat Bahadori	Firooz Sofeh	19
6	(Iran) Mojtaba Moridi Zadeh	Melli Haffari	19
6	(Iran) Ehsan Mohammadiyan	Shahrdari Saveh	19
6	(Brazil) Xapa	Giti Pasand	19
10	(Iran) Morteza Azimaei	Shahid Mansouri	18
10	(Iran) Ali Asghar Hassanzadeh	Foolad Mahan	18
10	(Iran) Farid Namazi	Melli Haffari Iran	18
10	(Iran) Alireza Vafaei	Saba Qom	18
14	(Iran) Iman Ahmadi	Rah Sari	17
14	(Iran) Vahid Shamsaei	Giti Pasand	17
14	(Iran) Mahdi Javid	Foolad Mahan	17
14	(Iran) Shahram Sharifzadeh	Gostaresh Foolad	17
18	5 players		16
23	1 player		15
24	3 players		14
27	3 players		13
30	3 players		12
33	7 players		11
40	4 players		10
44	7 players		9
51	10 players		8
61	5 players		7
66	4 players		6
70	12 players		5
82	11 players		4
93	14 players		3
107	21 players		2
128	30 players		1
_	1 players		OG
_	1 technical loses of 4–0		4
Total goals (Including technical loses)			1087
Total games			182
Average per game			5.97

Last updated: 9 March 2012

== Awards ==
Iranian Futsal Super League
2011–12 champions

Second title

- Winner: Shahid Mansouri Gharchak
- Runners-up: Giti Pasand Isfahan
- Third-Place: Foolad Mahan
- Top scorer: (Iran) Ahmad Esmaeilpour (Shahid Mansouri Gharchak) (32)

== See also ==
- 2011–12 Iran Futsal's 1st Division
- 2011–12 Persian Gulf Cup
- 2011–12 Azadegan League
- 2011–12 Iran Football's 2nd Division
- 2011–12 Iran Football's 3rd Division
- 2011–12 Hazfi Cup
- Iranian Super Cup
