= 2002–03 Iranian Premiere Futsal League =

Iranian Premier Futsal League
- Season: 2002–03
- Champions: Pas

The 2002–03 Iranian Premiere Futsal League was the 5th season of the Iran Pro League. The league will also be composed of 12 teams.

== Teams ==
Locations of clubs in 2002–03 Iranian Premier Futsal League

| Team | City |
|---|---|
| Chini Hamgam | Shahrekord |
| Dabiri | Tabriz |
| Esteghlal | Tehran |
| Faraz | Qom |
| Moghavemat | Rasht |
| Pas | Tehran |
| Persepolis | Tehran |
| Sadra | Shiraz |
| Shahrdari | Tonekabon |
| Shensa | Saveh |
| Sherkat Vahed | Qarchak |
| Shohada Basij | Ray |

== Awards ==
Iranian Premiere Futsal League
2002–03 champions
Pas
First title

- Winner: Pas
- Runners-up: Esteghlal
- Third-Place: Shensa
- Top scorer: ??
