= Payambar Azam Arena =

Indoor arena in Amol, Iran

Coordinates: 36.4697°N 52.3508°E

Payambar Azam پیامبر اعظم
- Interactive map of Payambar Azam پیامبر اعظم
- Full name: Payambar Azam Arena
- Location: Amol, Iran
- Owner: Iranian LIGA - Kalleh Mazandaran VC
- Capacity: 2,100
- Surface: Flooring

Construction
- Opened: 7 April

Tenant
- Kalleh Mazandarn VC Nirvana amol vc

The Payambar Azam Arena (Persian: مجموعه ورزشگاه پیامبر اعظم) is an indoor arena in Amol, Iran.

== Event ==
- 2007 WAFF Futsal Championship
- Martial qualifiers Iran 2008-2009-2010-2011

== See also ==
- Iran Sports Venue
