= Amir Shamsaei =

Iranian futsal player and coach

vahid Shamsaei
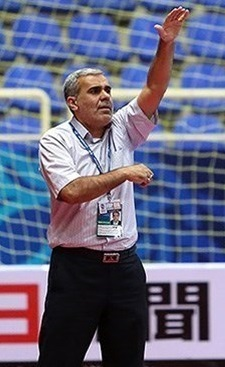

Personal information
- Full name: vahid Shamsaei
- Date of birth: 21 March 1967 (age 59)

Senior career*
| Years | Team | Apps | (Gls) |
- Entezam Tehran (football)
- Esteghlal
- Peyman Tehran
- Rah Ahan Tehran

International career^{‡}
- Iran

Managerial career
- Shensa
- 2007–2008: Eram Kish
- 2008: Poushineh Baft
- 2009–2010: Eram Kish
- 2012: Misagh
- 2012: Saba
- 2013–2014: Dabiri
- 2014: Mahan Tandis
- 2015–2016: Tasisat Daryaei
- Bank Pasargad
- 2020: Shahrdari Qazvin
- 2021: Pas Ghavamin (technical manager)
- * Club domestic league appearances and goals as of 20 July 2021 ‡ National team caps and goals as of 27 August 2019

Amir Shamsaei (Persian: امیر شمسایی; born 21 March 1967) is an Iranian professional futsal coach and former player.

== Personal life ==
He is the older brother of Vahid Shamsaei.

== Honours ==
- AFC Futsal Club Championship
  - Champions (1): 2015 (Tasisat Daryaei)
- Iranian Futsal Super League
  - Champion : 2013–14 (Dabiri)
