= Shensa Saveh FSC =

Iranian futsal club

Shensa
- Full name: Shensa Saveh Futsal Club
- Founded: 1999
- Dissolved: 2008
- Ground: Fajr-e Felestin Hall
- Capacity: 2,500
Home colours

Shensa Saveh Futsal Club (Persian: باشگاه فوتسال شن‌سا ساوه) was an Iranian futsal club based in Saveh.

== Honours ==
National

- Iranian Futsal Super League
  - Champions (2): 2003–04, 2005–06

Continental:

- Asia Futsal Cup
  - Champions (1): 2006
- Golden Cup
  - Champions (1): 2007

== Season-by-season ==
The table below chronicles the achievements of the Club in various competitions.

Season	League										Asia	Leagues Top goalscorer		Manager
Season	Division		P	W	D	L	GF	GA	Pts	Pos	Asia	Name	Goals	Manager
1999 ~ 2002	???													
2002–03	Super League									3rd				(Iran) Mehdi Abtahi
2003–04	Super League		22	18	2	2	106	49	56	1st				(Iran) Saeid Tahmtan
2004–05	Super League		26	12	7	7	78	71	43	3rd				
2005–06	Super League		26	19	4	3	101	61	61	1st	Champion*			(Brazil) Sávio Sousa
2005–06	AFC Futsal Club Championship	Group stage	2	2	0	0	15	0	6	1st	Champion*	(Iran) Mahmoud Lotfi	8	(Brazil) Sávio Sousa
2005–06	AFC Futsal Club Championship	Semi-finals	Shensa Saveh 10 - 5 (Thailand) CAT Telecom								Champion*	(Iran) Mahmoud Lotfi	8	(Brazil) Sávio Sousa
2005–06	AFC Futsal Club Championship	Finals	Shensa Saveh 5 - 1 (Uzbekistan) Ardus Tashkent								Champion*	(Iran) Mahmoud Lotfi	8	(Brazil) Sávio Sousa
2007–08	Super League		13	7	1	5	42	39	22	13th				(Brazil) Sávio Sousa
2007–08	Super League		Relegation to the 1st Division issued by Iranian Football Federation											(Brazil) Sávio Sousa

Notes:
* unofficial titles
1 worst title in history of club

Key

- P = Played
- W = Games won
- D = Games drawn
- L = Games lost
- GF = Goals for
- GA = Goals against
- Pts = Points
- Pos = Final position

Champions	Runners-up	Third Place	Fourth Place	Did not qualify	not held

== Players ==
=== World Cup players ===
(Guatemala) World Cup 2000

- (Iran) Moslem Tolouei

(Chinese Taipei) World Cup 2004

- (Iran) Mohammad Keshavarz

=== Notable players ===
- (Iran) Hossein Sabouri
- (Iran) Ebrahim Masoudi
- (Iran) Siamak Dadashi
- (Iran) Ali Kiaei
- (Iran) Mahmoud Lotfi
- (Iran) Mostafa Nazari
- (Iran) Afshin Kazemi
- (Iran) Mohsen Hassanzadeh
- (Iran) Saeid Abdollahnejadian
- (Iran) Reza Lak Aliabadi
- (Iran) Mohammad Keshavarz
- (Brazil) Sávio Sousa

Achievements
Preceded by Inaugural Champions	Asia Futsal Cup; 2006 (trial edition)	Succeeded by Foolad Mahan (Iran)
Preceded by Pas	Iranian Futsal Super League; 03-04 (First title)	Succeeded by Tam Iran Khodro
Preceded by Tam Iran Khodro	Iranian Futsal Super League; 05-06 (Second title)	Succeeded by Tam Iran Khodro
