= Sávio Sousa =

Brazilian footballer and trainer

Personal information
- Full name: Domingos Sávio Asevedo de Sousa
- Date of birth: 7 March 1977 (age 49)
- Place of birth: Parnaíba, Brazil

Youth career
- 1995: S.C Corinthians (Football)
- 1996: Ferroviário (CE) (Football)
- 1997: Parnaiba Sport Club (Football)

Senior career*
Years	Team	Apps	(Gls)
- Club Atletico Onix
1997–1998	FC Benavent		
1998–1999	Danon Ibarra		
1999–2001	In Time Aramis		
2001	Santa Fe Do Sul		
2005–2007	Shensa Saveh		

Managerial career
- 2001–2002: Brescia Calcio U-21
- 2003–2004: Peru national futsal team
- 2003–2004: Deportiva Casuarinas
- 2004–2005: Godolloi Bikaki
- 2005–2007: Shensa Saveh
- 2009: Shensa Arak (Technical Staff)
- 2009–2010: Shensa Arak
- * Club domestic league appearances and goals

Domingos Sávio Asevedo de Sousa (born 3 March 1977), or Sávio Sousa, is football coach and former player. He was a futsal trainer for the Iranian team Shensa Saveh, winning the Iran Super League and the Asian Champions Cup.

== Playing career ==
Sávio Sousa was born in Parnaíba, Piauí, Brazil. He joined the Iranian club Shensa Saveh in 2005 and was player-manager for the team.

== Managerial career ==
Sávio Sousa became the coach of Shensa Saveh in 2005 and won the Iranian Super league and Asian champions league in futsal. He became the coach of Shensa Arak in November 2009.

== Managerial statistics ==
As of 12 December 2009

Nat	Team	From	To	Record							
Nat	Team	From	To	G	W	D	L	Win %	GF	GA	+/-
(Iran)	Shensa Arak	October 2009	2010	7	2	3	2	30%	6	6	0
Total				7	2	3	2	30%	6	6	0

== Honours ==
With Shensa Saveh:

Iranian Super League (Futsal) champion:

  - 2006-07

AFC Futsal Club Championship Champion:

  - 2006
