= Shahid Mansouri Qarchak FSC =

Iranian futsal club

Shahid Mansouri
- Full name: Shahid Mansouri Qarchak Futsal Club
- Founded: 1997
- Dissolved: 2021
- Ground: Shohadaye 7th Tir Indoor Stadium, Qarchak
- Capacity: 3,000

Shahid Mansouri Qarchak Futsal Club (Persian: باشگاه فوتسال شهید منصوری قرچک, Bashgah-e Futsal-e Shihid Minsuri Qârcek) was an Iranian professional Futsal club based in Qarchak.

== History ==
The club was founded in 1997. After a string of 2nd place finishes in the league, Shahid Mansouri finally won the league for the first time in the 2010-11 season. During the same season in the 2011 AFC Futsal Club Championship they finished second after losing in the final 3-2 to Japanese club Nagoya Oceans. The club repeated as champions n the 2011–12 season. Since then the club has had several top 4 finishes in the league.

Before the 2016–17 Shahid Mansouri sold their license to Azad University and were instead placed in the 2nd Division (3rd tier).

== Season-by-season ==
The table below chronicles the achievements of the Club in various competitions.

| Season | League | | | | | | | | | | Asia | Hazfi | Leagues Top goalscorer | | Manager |
| Season | Division | | P | W | D | L | GF | GA | Pts | Pos | Asia | Hazfi | Name | Goals | Manager |
|---|---|---|---|---|---|---|---|---|---|---|---|---|---|---|---|
| 1997 ~ 2002 | ??? | | | | | | | | | | | | | | |
| 2002–03 | Premier League | | ??? | | | | | | | | | | | | |
| 2003–04 | Super League | | 22 | 12 | 2 | 8 | 81 | 83 | 38 | 2nd | | | | | |
| 2004–05 | Super League | | 26 | 10 | 5 | 11 | 94 | 93 | 35 | 9th^{1} | | | | | |
| 2005–06 | Super League | | 26 | 11 | 3 | 12 | 93 | 94 | 36 | 8th | | | | | Reza Davarzani / Nasser Saleh / Mohammadreza Edalatkhah |
| 2007–08 | Super League | | 25 | 17 | 6 | 2 | 133 | 69 | 57 | 2nd | | | Mohammad Taheri | 52 | Mohammadreza Edalatkhah |
| 2008–09 | Super League | | 22 | 11 | 6 | 5 | 83 | 67 | 39 | 4th | | | | | Saeid Tahmtan / Mostafa Emadi |
| 2009–10 | Super League | | 26 | 16 | 6 | 4 | 112 | 66 | 54 | 2nd | | | Mohammad Reza Zahmatkesh | 25 | Mehdi Abtahi |
| 2010–11 | Super League | | 23 | 15 | 5 | 3 | 101 | 54 | 50 | 1st | Runners-up | | Morteza Azimaei | 18 | Reza Lak Aliabadi |
| 2010–11 | AFCFCC | Group stage | 3 | 3 | 0 | 0 | 14 | 9 | 9 | 1st | Runners-up | | Morteza Azimaei | 7 | Reza Lak Aliabadi |
| 2010–11 | AFCFCC | Semi-finals | Shahid Mansouri 6 - 5 (Qatar) Al-Rayyan | | | | | | | | Runners-up | | Morteza Azimaei | 7 | Reza Lak Aliabadi |
| 2010–11 | AFCFCC | Finals | Shahid Mansouri 2 - 3 (Japan) Nagoya Oceans | | | | | | | | Runners-up | | Morteza Azimaei | 7 | Reza Lak Aliabadi |
| 2011–12 | Super League | | 26 | 21 | 2 | 3 | 114 | 56 | 65 | 1st | | | Ahmad Esmaeilpour | 32 | Reza Lak Aliabadi |
| 2012–13 | Super League | | 24 | 16 | 1 | 7 | 76 | 63 | 49 | 3rd | | | Mohammad Taheri | 20 | Reza Lak Aliabadi |
| 2013–14 | Super League | | 26 | 14 | 6 | 6 | 82 | 60 | 48 | 4th | | Withdrew | Hamid Nassiri | 20 | Reza Davarzani |
| 2013–14 | Hazfi Cup | Fourth Round | Ali Sadr Hamedan 3 – 0 (w/o) Shahid Mansouri | | | | | | | | | Withdrew | – | – | – |
| 2014–15 | Super League | | 26 | 11 | 5 | 10 | 71 | 64 | 38 | 5th | | | Hamid Nassiri | 19 | Reza Davarzani |
| 2015–16 | Super League | | 25 | 8 | 6 | 11 | 59 | 67 | 30 | 8th | | | Mohammad Taheri | 25 | Reza Davarzani |
| 2016–17 | Super League | | Sell his license to Azad University | | | | | | | | | | – | – | – |
| 2016–17 | 2nd Division | Group stage | 14 | 4 | 5 | 5 | 48 | 48 | 17 | 5th / Group 1 | | | | | Mahdi Golpour / Hadi Mansouri |
| 2020–21 | Super League | | 12 | 4 | 1 | 7 | 30 | 39 | 13 | 5th / Group A | | | Mohammad Najaf Zangi | 6 | Mohsen Hassanzadeh |
| Super league total | | | 309 | 166 | 54 | 89 | 1129 | 875 | 552 | | | | | | |
| AFCFCC total | | | 5 | 4 | 0 | 1 | 22 | 17 | 12 | | | | | | |
| 2nd Division total | | | 14 | 4 | 5 | 5 | 48 | 48 | 17 | | | | | | |
| Total | | | 328 | 174 | 59 | 95 | 1199 | 940 | 581 | | | | | | |

Last updated: April 29, 2021

Notes:
* unofficial titles
1 worst title in history of club

Key

- P = Played
- W = Games won
- D = Games drawn
- L = Games lost
- GF = Goals for
- GA = Goals against
- Pts = Points
- Pos = Final position

| Champions | Runners-up | Third Place | Fourth Place | Did not qualify | not held |

== Honours ==
National:

- Iranian Futsal Super League
  - Champions (2): 2010–11 - 2011–12
  - Runners-up (3): 2003–04 - 2007–08 - 2009–10

Continental:

- AFC Futsal Club Championship
  - Runners-up (1): 2011

Individual

- Top Goalscorer:
  - 2007–08: (Iran) Mohammad Taheri (52 Goals)
  - 2011–12: (Iran) Ahmad Esmaeilpour (32 Goals)
- Best player:
  - (Iran) AFC Futsal Club Championship 2011 – Mohammad Keshavarz

== Players ==
=== World cup players ===
(Chinese Taipei) World Cup 2004

- (Iran) Siamak Dadashi
- (Iran) Babak Masoumi

(Brazil) World Cup 2008

- (Iran) Mohammad Keshavarz
- (Iran) Mohammad Taheri

(Thailand) World Cup 2012

- (Iran) Ali Kiaei
- (Iran) Ali Rahnama
- (Iran) Hamid Ahmadi
- (Iran) Mostafa Tayyebi
- (Iran) Mohammad Taheri

=== Notable players ===
- (Iran) Mohammad Keshavarz
- (Iran) Reza Lak Aliabadi
- (Iran) Mohammad Dehggan
- (Iran) Mohammad Kouhestani
- (Iran) Masoud Daneshvar
- (Iran) Meysam Khayyam
- (Iran) Majid Tikdarinejad
- (Iran) Meysam Ilanlou
- (Iran) Morteza Azimaei
- (Iran) Siamak Dadashi
- (Iran) Ahmad Esmaeilpour
- (Iran) Saeid Ghalandari
- (Iran) Babak Masoumi
- (Iran) Mohammad Taheri
- (Iran) Mojtaba Nassirnia
- (Iran) Mostafa Tayyebi
- (Iran) Ali Kiaei
- (Iran) Ali Rahnama
- (Iran) Majid Latifi
- (Iran) Reza Naseri
- (Iran) Mahdi Javid
- (Iran) Hamid Ahmadi
- (Iran) Afshin Kazemi
- (Iran) Reza Molaei
- (Iran) Ahmad Pari Azar
- (Iran) Davoud Abbasi
- (Iran) Mohammadreza Zahmatkesh
- (Iran) Maziar Amirkhanlou
- (Iran) Hamid Nassiri
- (Iran) Esmaeil Vatankhah
- (Iran) Amin Majidipour
- (Iran) Peyman Hafizi

== See also ==
- Moghavemat Qarchak
- Setaregan Varamin

Sporting positions
| Preceded by Foolad Mahan | Iranian Futsal Super League; 10-11 (First title); 11-12 (Second title) | Succeeded by Giti Pasand |
