= Ali Kiaei =

Iranian futsal player

Personal information
- Full name: Seyed Ali Kiaei
- Date of birth: 20 April 1987 (age 39)
- Place of birth: Karaj, Iran
- Height: 1.80 m (5 ft 11 in)
- Position: Right winger

Team information
- Current team: Moghavemat Alborz (assistant)

Senior career*
Years	Team	Apps	(Gls)
- Persepolis
- Shensa
2010–2016	Shahid Mansouri		
2016–2018	Shahrvand		(3)
2018–2019	Shahrdari Saveh		(7)

International career^{‡}
- Iran U23
- Iran

Managerial career
- 2021–: Moghavemat Alborz (assistant)
- * Club domestic league appearances and goals as of 17 December 2022 ‡ National team caps and goals as of 28 April 2021

Seyed Ali Kiaei (Persian: سید علی کیایی; born 20 April 1987) is an Iranian professional futsal coach and former player. He is currently assistant coach of Moghavemat Alborz in the Iranian Futsal Super League.

== Honours ==
=== Country ===
- Asian Indoor and Martial Arts Games
  - Champions (3): 2007, 2009 - 2013

=== Club ===
- AFC Futsal Club Championship
  - Runners-up (1): 2011 (Shahid Mansouri)
- Iranian Futsal Super League
  - Champions (2): 2010–11 (Shahid Mansouri) - 2011–12 (Shahid Mansouri)
