= Mahmoud Lotfi =

Iranian futsal player

Personal information
- Full name: Mahmoud Lotfi
- Date of birth: 9 January 1984 (age 42)
- Position: Defender

Senior career*
Years	Team	Apps	(Gls)
2001–2006	Shahrvand		
2006–2007	Shensa		
2007–2017	Shahrvand		

International career^{‡}
- Iran

Managerial career
- 2021: Shahrvand (assistant)
- * Club domestic league appearances and goals as of 11 October 2021 ‡ National team caps and goals as of 7 October 2014

Mahmoud Lotfi (Persian: محمود لطفی; born 9 January 1984) is an Iranian professional futsal coach and former player.

== Honours ==
=== Country ===
- Confederations Cup
  - Champion (1): 2009

=== Club ===
- AFC Futsal Club Championship
  - Champion (1): 2006 (Shensa)

=== Individual ===
- Top Goalscorer:
  - AFC Futsal Club Championship: 2006 (Shensa) (8 goals)
  - Iranian Futsal Super League: 2003–04 (Shahrvand) (36 goals)

Sporting positions
Preceded by -	Iranian Futsal Super League top scorer 03-04 (36 Goals)	Succeeded by (Iran) Vahid Shamsaei
