= 2007–08 Iran Futsal's 1st Division =

Iranian Futsal 1st Division
- Season: 2007–08
- Promoted: Labaniyat Arjan; Melli Haffari

The 2007–08 Iranian Futsal 1st Division will be divided into two phases.

The league will also be composed of 16 teams divided into two divisions of 8 teams each, whose teams will be divided geographically. Teams will play only other teams in their division, once at home and once away for a total of 14 matches each.

== Teams ==
Locations of clubs in 2007–08 Futsal 1st Division

=== Group A ===
Team	City
Azarab	Tabriz
Daneshgah Oloum Pezeshki	Qom
Fajr Ghaem Galoogah	Galoogah
Hefazati Shab	Qazvin
Hilal Ahmar Tabriz	Tabriz
Sanaye Mahbobi Amol	Amol
Saveh Shen	Saveh
Shahrvand Babol	Babol

=== Group B ===
Team	City
Abipooshan Isfahan	Isfahan
Arjan Shiraz	Shiraz
Daryanavardan Bushehr	Bushehr
Moghavemat Fars	Shiraz
Moghavemat Shahrekord	Shahrekord
Persepolis Khozestan	Ahvaz
Melli Haffari Iran	Ahvaz
Tarbiat Badani Yazd	Yazd

== Play Off ==
First leg to be played April 03, 2008; return leg to be played April 10, 2008

Team 1	Agg.	Team 2	1st leg	2nd leg
Azar Aab	7-7	Melli Haffari	5-4	2-3

Melli Haffari Promoted to the Super League.

=== First leg ===
April 03, 2008

Azar Aab	5 - 4	Melli Haffari

, Tabriz

=== Return leg ===
April 10, 2008

Melli Haffari	3 - 2	Azar Aab
Alireza Ghobeishavi 2', 7'; Morteza Loveimi 23'	Report	Mohammadreza Boraghjam 13'; Reza Shams 20'

Naft Arena, Ahvaz

First leg to be played April 03, 2008; return leg to be played April 10, 2008

Team 1	Agg.	Team 2	1st leg	2nd leg
Labaniyat Arjan	10-9	Hilal Ahmar Tabriz	6-5	4-4

Labaniyat Arjan Promoted to the Super League.

=== First leg ===
April 03, 2008

Labaniyat Arjan	6- 5	Hilal Ahmar Tabriz

Sadra Arena, Shiraz

=== Return leg ===
April 10, 2008

Hilal Ahmar Tabriz	4 - 4	Labaniyat Arjan
Shahram Sharifzadeh 2 Nima Aalyari	Report	Mohsen Nemati; Gholam Hossein Saberi; Mohammad Kazem Heydari; Arash Nemat-Allahi

Shahrdari Tabriz Arena, Tabriz
Attendance: 5.000

== See also ==
- 2007–08 Iranian Futsal Super League
- 2007–08 Persian Gulf Cup
- 2007–08 Azadegan League
- 2007–08 Iran Football's 2nd Division
- 2007–08 Iran Football's 3rd Division
- 2007–08 Hazfi Cup
- Iranian Super Cup
