= Chinese Futsal League =

- Country: China
- Confederation: AFC
- Number of clubs: 12
- Level on pyramid: 1
- International cup: AFC Futsal Club Championship
- Current champions: Shenzhen Nanling (2022/2023)
- Current: 2022/2023 China Futsal Super League

The Chinese Futsal League (CFL) is the top league for futsal in China. The winning team obtains the participation right to the AFC Futsal Club Championship.

== History ==
| Seasons | Winner |
|---|---|
| 2003-2004 | Guangzhou Guowang |
| 2005 | Wuhan Dilong |
| 2006 | Wuhan Dilong |
| 2007 | Wuhan Dilong |
| 2007-2008 | Wuhan Dilong |
| 2008-2009 | Wuhan Dilong |
| 2009-2010 | Wuhan Dilong |
| 2010-2011 | Shenzhen Nanling |
| 2011-2012 | Shenzhen Nanling |
| 2012-2013 | Shenzhen Nanling |
| 2013-2014 | Shenzhen Nanling |
| 2014-2015 | Dalian Yuan Dynasty |
| 2015-2016 | Shenzhen Nanling |
| 2016-2017 | Guangdong Yingde |
| 2017-2018 | Hangzhou Wuyue |
| 2019 | Ningbo Daxie |
| 2021 | Xinjiang Sparta |
| 2022 | Zhaoqing Aodong Lizhou |
| 2023 | Ningxia Pingluo Hengli |
| 2024 | Xinjiang Hatila |
