= Misagh Tehran FSC =

Iranian futsal club

- Full name: Misagh Tehran Futsal Club
- Founded: 2008
- Dissolved: 14 August 2016
- Ground: Shahrdari Mantaghe 11 Arena, Tehran
- Capacity: 300
- Website: http://www.fcmisagh.com

Misagh Tehran Futsal Club (Persian: باشگاه فوتسال میثاق تهران) was an Iranian futsal club based in Tehran.

== Dissolution ==
On 14 August 2016 Misagh terminated their activities due to financial problems.

== Season-by-season ==
The table below chronicles the achievements of the Club in various competitions.

Season	League	Position	Hazfi	Notes
2008	Tehran Province League	1st		Promoted
2008-09	Local League	??
2009	Tehran Province League	1st		Promoted
2009-10	Local League	1st		Promoted
2010	2nd Div	1st		Promoted
2010-11	1st Div	1st		Promoted
2011-12	Futsal Super League	12th
2012-13	Futsal Super League	5th
2013-14	Futsal Super League	5th	Runners-up
2014-15	Futsal Super League	9th
2015-16	Futsal Super League	9th

== Honors ==
National:

- Iranian Futsal Hazfi Cup
  - Runners-up (1): 2013–14
- Tehran Province League
  - Champions (2): 2008, 2009
- Local League
  - Champions (1): 2009-10
- Iran Futsal's 2nd Division
  - Champions (1): 2010
- Iran Futsal's 1st Division
  - Champions (1): 2010-11

== First-team squad ==
Source: Note: Flags indicate national team as defined under FIFA eligibility rules; some limited exceptions apply. Players may hold more than one non-FIFA nationality.

No.	Pos.	Nation	Player
6		(Iran) IRN	Majid Hajibandeh
7		(Iran) IRN	Mousa Hasandoost
8		(Iran) IRN	Mojtaba Hassanzadeh
10		(Iran) IRN	Morteza Farahani
13		(Iran) IRN	Mohsen Kabirian
18		(Iran) IRN	Farid Soheili
20		(Iran) IRN	Hossein Soltani

No.	Pos.	Nation	Player
—		(Iran) IRN	Vahid Ghoreshi
—		(Iran) IRN	Mehrdad Azamei
—		(Iran) IRN	Zahir Kamyab
—		(Iran) IRN	Mohsen Farahmand
—		(Iran) IRN	Elias Barati
—		(Iran) IRN	Aref Boloki
