= Mohammad Taheri =

Iranian futsal player

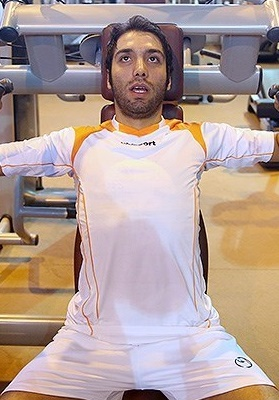

Personal information
- Full name: Mohammad Taheri
- Date of birth: 2 May 1985 (age 41)
- Place of birth: Tehran, Iran
- Height: 1.76 m (5 ft 9 in)
- Position: Left winger

Youth career
- –2002: Dokhaniat Tehran

Senior career*
Years	Team	Apps	(Gls)
2002–2009	Shahid Mansouri		
2009–2012	Foolad Mahan		
2011	→ Al Rayyan (loan)	5	(5)
2012–2013	Shahid Mansouri		(20)
2013–2015	Giti Pasand		(24)
2015–2016	Shahid Mansouri	25	(25)
2015	→ Qadsia SC (loan)	5	(4)
2016	Gas Al Janoob		
2016–2018	Shahrvand		(11)
2018–2019	Moghavemat Qarchak		(8)
2019–2020	Setaregan		(12)
2020–2021	Shahid Mansouri		(4)
2021–2022	Mes Sungun		(0)

International career^{‡}
2004–2006	Iran U23		
2004–2016	Iran	170	(160)
Medal record
Representing Iran
Men's Futsal
FIFA Futsal World Cup
Bronze medal – third place	2016 Colombia
AFC Futsal Championship
Gold medal – first place	2005 Ho Chi Minh City
Gold medal – first place	2007 Osaka & Amagasaki
Gold medal – first place	2008 Bangkok
Gold medal – first place	2010 Tashkent
Gold medal – first place	2016 Tashkent
Silver medal – second place	2014 Ho Chi Minh City
Asian Indoor Games
Gold medal – first place	2005 Bangkok
Gold medal – first place	2007 Macau
Gold medal – first place	2013 Incheon
Futsal Confederations Cup
Gold medal – first place	2009 Tripoli
- * Club domestic league appearances and goals as of 1 May 2022 ‡ National team caps and goals as of 28 April 2021

Mohammad Taheri (Persian: محمد طاهری; born 2 May 1985) is an Iranian professional futsal player.

== Honours ==
=== Country ===
- FIFA Futsal World Cup
  - Third place (1): 2016
- AFC Futsal Championship
  - Champion (5): 2005 - 2007 - 2008 - 2010 - 2016
  - Runners-up (1): 2014
- Asian Indoor and Martial Arts Games
  - Champion (3): 2005 - 2007 - 2013
- Confederations Cup
  - Champion (1): 2009
- WAFF Futsal Championship
  - Champion (1): 2007
- Grand Prix
  - Runner-Up (1): 2015

=== Club ===
- AFC Futsal Club Championship
  - Champion (1): 2010 (Foolad Mahan)
  - Runner-Up (1): 2013 (Giti Pasand)
- Iranian Futsal Super League
  - Champion (1): 2009–10 (Foolad Mahan)
  - Runners-up (4): 2003–04 (Shahid Mansouri) - 2007–08 (Shahid Mansouri) - 2013–14 (Giti Pasand) - 2014–15 (Giti Pasand)

=== Individual ===
- Best player:
  - 2010 AFC Futsal Player of the Year
  - 2010 AFC Futsal Championship
- Top Goalscorer:
  - Asian Indoor Games: 2007 (12 goals)
  - AFC Futsal Championship: 2010 (13 goals)
  - Iranian Futsal Super League: 2007–08 (Shahid Mansouri) (52 goals)

Sporting positions
Preceded by Vahid Shamsaei	Asian Futsaler of the Year; 2010	Succeeded by Mohammad Keshavarz
Preceded by Vahid Shamsaei	AFC Futsal Championship Top Scorers; 2010 (13 Goals)	Succeeded by Vahid Shamsaei
Preceded by Vahid Shamsaei	AFC Futsal Championship MVP; 2010	Succeeded by Rafael Henmi
Preceded by Vahid Shamsaei	Iranian Futsal Super League top scorer 07-08 (52 Goals)	Succeeded by Vahid Shamsaei; Morteza Azimaei
