= 2006 Asia Futsal Cup =

Tournament details
- Host country: Iran
- Dates: March 7–12
- Teams: 6
- Venue: 1 (in 1 host city)

Final positions
- Champions: (Iran) Shensa Saveh (1st title)
- Runners-up: (Uzbekistan) Ardus Tashkent
- Third place: (Thailand) CAT Telecom
- Fourth place: (Japan) Sharks

Tournament statistics
- Matches played: 10
- Goals scored: 70 (7 per match)
- Top scorer: (Iran) Mahmoud Lotfi (8)

The 2006 Asia Futsal Cup was the trial edition AFC Futsal Club Championship. It was held in Saveh, Iran between March 7 and March 12, 2006.

== Qualified teams ==
The following six teams will play the final tournament.

- (Uzbekistan) Ardus Tashkent
- (Thailand) CAT Telecom
- (Kyrgyzstan) Energobank
- Malaysia national futsal team
- (Japan) Sharks
- (Iran) Shensa Saveh

== Venue ==
Saveh
Fajr-e Felestin Hall
Capacity: 2,500
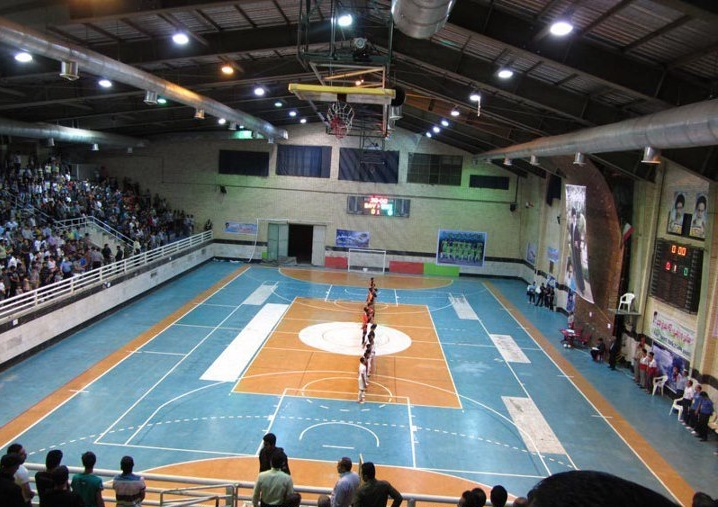

== Group stage ==
=== Group A ===
Team	Pld	W	D	L	GF	GA	GD	Pts
(Iran) Shensa Saveh	2	2	0	0	15	0	+15	6
(Japan) Sharks	2	1	0	1	6	6	0	3
Malaysia	2	0	0	2	1	16	−15	0

March 7
16:00

Shensa Saveh (Iran)	10 – 0	Malaysia
M. Lotfi 4 A. Kazemi 2 G. Brandao 2 J. Machado; V. Ebrahimi	Report

Fajr-e Felestin Hall, Saveh
Attendance: 2,500
Referee: Abdulrahman Abdulqader Abdulrahman Abdulla (Bahrain)

March 8
16:00

Sharks (Japan)	6 – 1	Malaysia
	Report

Fajr-e Felestin Hall, Saveh

March 9
16:00

Shensa Saveh (Iran)	5 – 0	(Japan) Sharks
M. Lotfi 2 M. Keshavarz; A. Kazemi; Mauro

Fajr-e Felestin Hall, Saveh
Referee: Kalam Badralhesham (Malaysia)

=== Group B ===
Team	Pld	W	D	L	GF	GA	GD	Pts
(Uzbekistan) Ardus Tashkent	2	1	1	0	7	5	+2	4
(Thailand) CAT Telecom	2	0	2	0	5	5	0	2
(Kyrgyzstan) Energobank	2	0	1	1	4	6	−2	1

March 7
18:00

CAT Telecom (Thailand)	2 – 2	(Kyrgyzstan) Energobank
	Report

Fajr-e Felestin Hall, Saveh

March 8
18:00

Ardus Tashkent (Uzbekistan)	4 – 2	(Kyrgyzstan) Energobank
	Report

Fajr-e Felestin Hall, Saveh

March 9
18:00

Ardus Tashkent (Uzbekistan)	3 – 3	(Thailand) CAT Telecom

Fajr-e Felestin Hall, Saveh

== Knockout stage ==
Semi-finals
March 11 – Saveh
(Iran) Shensa Saveh	10
(Thailand) CAT Telecom	5
March 11 – Saveh
(Uzbekistan) Ardus Tashkent	5
(Japan) Sharks	1

Final
March 12 – Saveh
(Iran) Shensa Saveh	5
(Uzbekistan) Ardus Tashkent	1
Third place
March 12 – Saveh
(Thailand) CAT Telecom	4
(Japan) Sharks	1

=== Semi-finals ===
March 11
16:00

Shensa Saveh (Iran)	10 – 5	(Thailand) CAT Telecom
A. Kazemi 3 M. Keshavarz 2 G. Brandao; F. Machado; M. Lotfi; R. Azeredo; A. Keshvar	Report

Fajr-e Felestin Hall, Saveh

March 11
18:00

Ardus Tashkent (Uzbekistan)	5 – 1	(Japan) Sharks
	Report

Fajr-e Felestin Hall, Saveh

=== Third place play-off ===
March 12
15:30

CAT Telecom (Thailand)	4 – 1	(Japan) Sharks
P. Innovi 11', 39'; P. Panta 12', 16'	Report	H. Takao 11'

Fajr-e Felestin Hall, Saveh

=== Final ===
March 12
17:30

Shensa Saveh (Iran)	5 – 1	(Uzbekistan) Ardus Tashkent
R. Azevedo 7', 22'; M. Keshavarz 25'; M. Lotfi 26'; A. Keshvar 26'	Report	F. Fahrutdinov 34'

Fajr-e Felestin Hall, Saveh
Attendance: 2,500

== Awards ==
Asia Futsal Cup
2006 Champions

Shensa Saveh

- Most Valuable Player
- Top Scorer
  - (Iran) Mahmoud Lotfi (8 goals)
- Fair-Play Award
