= Mehdi Abtahi =

Iranian futsal coach

Seyyed Mehdi Abtahi
Personal information
- Full name: Seyyed Mehdi Abtahi
- Date of birth: March 2, 1963 (age 63)
- Place of birth: Tehran, Iran
- Position: Left winger

Senior career*
Years	Team	Apps	(Gls)
1983–1993	Vahdat		
1987	→Persepolis (loan)		
1990	→Esteghlal (loan)		
1992	→Esteghlal (loan)		
1994	Keshavarz	13	(1)
1994–1995	Moghavemat Basij		
1995–1996	Bahman	30	(1)

International career^{‡}
1985–1993	Iran	33	(3)
1992	Iran (futsal)		

Managerial career
- 2002–2003: Shensa
- 2004: Pegah Gilan
- 2006: Fajr Ghaem Galugah
- 2008–2009: Eram Kish
- 2009–2010: Shahid Mansouri
- 2010: Foolad Mahan
- 2010–2011: Giti Pasand
- 2011–2013: Melli Haffari
- 2013–2014: Shahrdari Saveh
- 2014–2015: Shahrvand
- 2015: Gallery Armin (technical manager)
- 2017: Esteghlal Novin
- * Club domestic league appearances and goals as of 20 July 2021 ‡ National team caps and goals as of 20 July 2021

Seyyed Mehdi Abtahi (Persian: سیدمهدی ابطحی; born 2 March 1963) is an Iranian professional futsal coach and former footballer.

== Career ==
Abtahi made 33 appearances for the Iran national football team from 1985 to 1993.

== Honors ==
=== Iran ===
- AFC Asian Cup
  - 1988, Third Place
  - 1992, Group Stage
- Asian Games
  - 1986 Asian Games Quarter Final
  - 1990 Asian Games Champions

=== Esteghlal FC ===
- Asian Club Championship
  - 1990–91 Champions
  - 1992 Runner-up

=== Bahman FC ===
- Azadegan League
  - 1995–96 Runner-up
