= Tam Iran Khodro Tehran FSC =

Football club in Tehran, Iran

- Full name: Tam Iran Khodro Tehran Futsal Club
- Nickname(s): Tam Iran Khodro
- Dissolved: 2009
- Ground: SAPCO Arena, Tehran
- Owner: Tam Iran Khodro
- Chairman: Nader Zandi
- League: Iranian Futsal Super League
- 2008–09: 3rd

Tam Iran Khodro Tehran Futsal Club (Persian: باشگاه فوتسال تام ایران خودرو) was an Iranian futsal club based in Tehran.

== Notable players ==
- (Iran) Mohammad Hashemzadeh
- (Iran) Ebrahim Masoudi
- (Iran) Babak Masoumi
- (Iran) Reza Naseri
- (Iran) Vahid Shamsaei
- (Iran) Majid Tikdarinejad

== Honours ==
National:

- Futsal Super League
  - Champions (2): 2004–05, 2007–08
  - Runners-up (1): 2005–06
- Iran Futsal's 1st Division
  - Champions (1): 2003–04

Individual

- Top Goalscorer:
  - 2005–06: (Iran) Vahid Shamsaei (55)

== Season-by-season ==
The table below chronicles the achievements of the Club in various competitions.

Season	League	Position	Notes
2003–04	1st Division	1st
2004–05	Futsal Super League	1st
2005–06	Futsal Super League	2nd
2007–08	Futsal Super League	1st
2008–09	Futsal Super League	3rd

Achievements
Preceded by Shensa Saveh	Iranian Futsal Super League; 04-05 (First title)	Succeeded by Shensa Saveh
Preceded by Shensa Saveh	Iranian Futsal Super League; 07-08 (Second title)	Succeeded by Foolad Mahan
