= 2004–05 Iranian Futsal Super League =

Iranian Futsal Super League
- Season: 2004–05
- Champions: Tam Iran Khodro
- Relegated: Chini Hamgam; Persepolis
- Matches played: 182
- Goals scored: 1,248 (6.86 per match)

The 2004–05 Iranian Futsal Super League will be the 2nd season of the Futsal Super League.

== Play Off ==
- Dabiri
- Chini Hamgam
- Post
- Shahrdari Tonekabon

== League standings ==
Pos	Team	Pld	W	D	L	GF	GA	GD	Pts	Qualification or relegation
1	Tam Iran Khodro (C)	26	15	7	4	106	84	+22	52	League Champions
2	Eram Kish	26	16	2	8	105	88	+17	50	
3	Shensa	26	12	7	7	78	71	+7	43	
4	Pegah	26	13	3	10	100	88	+12	42	
5	Post	26	12	5	9	83	69	+14	41	
6	Azad University	26	11	6	9	70	68	+2	39	
7	Sazman Bazargani	26	9	9	8	81	78	+3	36	
8	Rah Sari	26	10	5	11	102	101	+1	35	
9	Shahid Mansouri	26	10	5	11	94	93	+1	35	
10	Rah Ahan	26	8	6	12	85	87	−2	30	
11	Sadra	26	8	6	12	99	102	−3	30	
12	Esteghlal	26	8	6	12	76	95	−19	30	
13	Chini Hamgam (R)	26	6	4	16	94	120	−26	22	Relegation to the 1st Division
14	Persepolis (R)	26	5	7	14	75	104	−29	22	Relegation to the 1st Division

Updated to match(es) played on 14 October 2005. Source: Futsal Planet
Rules for classification: 1) points; 2) goal difference; 3) number of goals scored.
(C) Champions; (R) Relegated

== Awards ==
Iranian Futsal Super League
2004–05 champions
Tam Iran Khodro
First title

- Winner: Tam Iran Khodro
- Runners-up: Eram Kish
- Third-Place: Shensa
- Top scorer: (Iran) Vahid Shamsaei (Eram Kish) (38)
