= Fajr-e Felestin Hall =

Fajr Hall
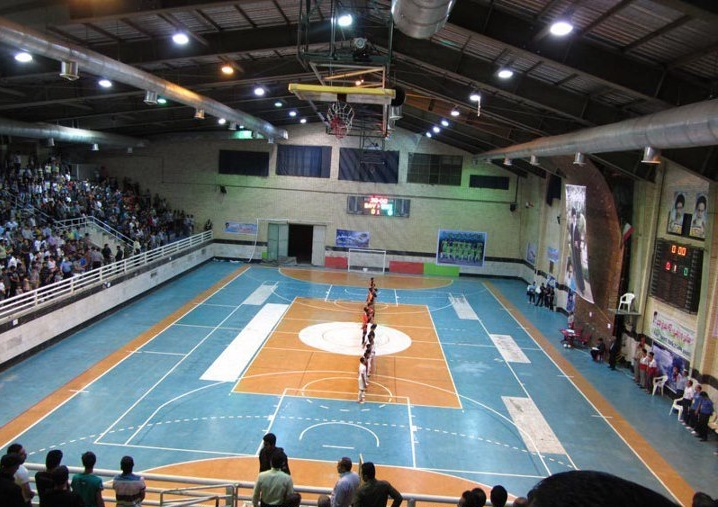
- Full name: Fajr-e Felestin Hall
- Location: Saveh, Iran
- Owner: Iran Physical Education Organization
- Capacity: 2,500
- Field size: 3,975 m

Tenants
- Sunich; Shahrdari Saveh; AFC Futsal Club Championship : 2006

The Fajr-e Felestin Hall is an indoor sports arena in Saveh, Iran. It is the home stadium of Futsal Super League teams Shahrdari Saveh. The facility seats 2,500 people.

Preceded by	AFC Futsal Club Championship; Host Venue; 2006	Succeeded by Pirouzi Arena (Iran) Esfahan
