= Foolad Mahan FSC =

Iranian futsal club

Foolad Mahan
- Full name: Foolad Mahan Sepahan Isfahan Futsal Club
- Nickname: Foolad Mahan
- Founded: 2008
- Dissolved: 17 July 2012
- Ground: Pirouzi Arena, Isfahan
- Capacity: 4,300
- Owner: (Iran) Behrouz Rikhtegaran
- Chairman: (Iran) Mohammad Reza Saket
- Head Coach: (Iran) Hossein Afzali
- League: Iranian Futsal Super League
- 2011–12: 3rd
- Website: http://fooladmahansports.com/

Foolad Mahan Sepahan Isfahan Futsal Club (Persian: باشگاه فوتسال فولاد ماهان سپاهان اصفهان) was an Iranian Futsal club based in Isfahan, Iran. It was part of Foolad Mahan Sepahan Sports Club. Foolad Mahan hosted the first AFC champions league tournament during March 4–12, 2010.

== History ==
The club was originally known as Post Isfahan. In the 2007–08 Iranian Futsal Super League it was renamed Foolad Mahan due to change of sponsorship. They have been champions of the Iranian Futsal Super League twice, and have also won the AFC Futsal Club Championship once.

== Season-by-season ==
The table below chronicles the achievements of the Club in various competitions.

Season	League	Position	Asia	Notes
2003-04	1st Div	??	Did not qualify	Promoted
2004–05	Futsal Super League	5th	Did not qualify
2005–06	Futsal Super League	4th	Did not qualify
2007–08	Futsal Super League	3rd	Did not qualify
2008–09	Futsal Super League	1st	Did not qualify
2009–10	Futsal Super League	1st	Champion
2010-11	Futsal Super League	3rd	Did not qualify
2011-12	Futsal Super League	3rd	Did not qualify	-

== Honours ==
National:

- Iranian Futsal Super League:
  - Champions (2): 2008–09, 2009–10

Continental:

- AFC Futsal Club Championship:
  - Champions (1): 2010

Individual

- Best player:
  - (Iran) Asian Futsaler of the Year 2008 – Vahid Shamsaei
  - (Iran) Asian Futsaler of the Year 2010 – Mohammad Taheri
- AFC Futsal Club Championship MVP Award:
  - (Iran) 2010 – Vahid Shamsaei
- AFC Futsal Championship MVP Award:
  - (Iran) 2010 – Mohammad Taheri
- Iran World Cup captains:
  - (Iran) 2008 – Vahid Shamsaei
- Top Goalscorer:
  - 2010 AFC Futsal Club Championship: (Iran) Vahid Shamsaei (17)
  - 2008–09 Iranian Futsal Super League: (Iran) Vahid Shamsaei (31)
  - 2009–10 Iranian Futsal Super League: (Iran) Vahid Shamsaei (34)

== Statistics and records ==
=== Statistics in IPL ===
- Seasons in Iranian Futsal Super League: 7
- Best position in Iranian Futsal Super League: First (2008–09), (2009–10)
- Worst position in Iranian Futsal Super League: 5th (2004–05)
- Most goals scored in a season: 116 (2009–10), (2011–12)
- Most goals scored in a match: 13 - 2
- Most goals conceded in a match: 8 - 6

=== Statistics in AFC Futsal Club Championship ===
- Most goals scored in a match: 12 – 1 (1 time)
- Most goals conceded in a match: 5 – 3 (1 time)

=== General statistics ===
- All-time top scorer: ? with ? goals (All Competitions)
- All-time Most Appearances:
- Player who has won most titles:

== Players ==
=== 2011-12 First-team squad ===
Note: Flags indicate national team as defined under FIFA eligibility rules; some limited exceptions apply. Players may hold more than one non-FIFA nationality.

No.	Pos.	Nation	Player
1	GK	IRN	Hamid Reza Abrarinia
6	WI	BRA	Café
8		IRN	Majid Raeisi
10	WI	IRN	Javad Asghari Moghaddam (Captain)
11		IRN	Mohammad Taheri
12	GK	IRN	Sepehr Mohammadi
14		IRN	Mahdi Javid

No.	Pos.	Nation	Player
17		IRN	Mehrzad Jaberi
—		BRA	Jé
—		IRN	Hossein Tayyebi
—		IRN	Hossein Mahdavi
—		IRN	Saeed Ghasemi
—		IRN	Mohammad Zarei
—		IRN	Mohammad Hashemzadeh

=== Former players ===
For details on former players, see Category:Foolad Mahan FSC players.

=== World Cup Players ===
(Brazil) World Cup 2008

- (Iran) Hamid Reza Abrarinia
- (Iran) Vahid Shamsaei
- (Iran) Javad Asghari Moghaddam
- (Iran) Mohammad Hashemzadeh

=== Famous players ===
- (Iran) Hamid Reza Abrarinia
- (Iran) Javad Asghari Moghaddam
- (Iran) Ahmad Esmaeilpour
- (Iran) Mohammad Hashemzadeh
- (Iran) Mohammad Keshavarz
- (Iran) Reza Nasseri
- (Iran) Mostafa Nazari
- (Iran) Majid Raeisi
- (Iran) Vahid Shamsaei
- (Iran) Mohammad Taheri
- (Brazil) Ciço
- (Brazil) Jé

== See also ==
- Foolad Mahan Novin Futsal Club
- Foolad Mahan Isfahan Football Club

Achievements
Preceded by Shensa Saveh (Iran)	AFC Futsal Club Championship; 2010 (First title)	Succeeded by Nagoya Oceans (Japan)
Preceded by Tam Iran Khodro	Iranian Futsal Super League; 08-09 (First title); 09-10 (Second title)	Succeeded by Shahid Mansouri
