= Vahid Shamsaei =

Iranian futsal player and coach

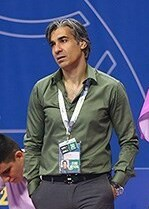
- Shamsaei in 2022

Personal information
- Date of birth: 21 September 1975 (age 51)
- Place of birth: Tehran, Iran
- Height: 5 ft 10 in (1.78 m)
- Position: Pivot

Team information
- Current team: Iran (manager)

Senior career*
Years	Team	Apps	(Gls)
1999–2002	Peyman		
2002–2003	Esteghlal		
2003–2004	Lazio	11	(19)
2004–2005	Eram Kish		(38)
2005–2008	Tam Iran Khodro		
2008–2011	Foolad Mahan		
2011–2012	Giti Pasand		(17)
2012–2013	Shenzhen Nanling		
2013–2014	Dabiri		(15)
2014–2018	Tasisat Daryaei		(55)
2021	Giti Pasand	4	(1)

International career^{‡}
1999–2017	Iran	189	(392)

Managerial career
- 2014–2018: Tasisat Daryaei (Player-coach)
- 2020–2021: Giti Pasand (Player-coach)
- 2022–: Iran
Medal record
Representing Iran
Men's Futsal
AFC Futsal Championship
Gold medal – first place	2000 Bangkok
Gold medal – first place	2001 Tehran
Gold medal – first place	2002 Jakarta
Gold medal – first place	2003 Tehran
Gold medal – first place	2004 Macau
Gold medal – first place	2005 Ho Chi Minh City
Gold medal – first place	2007 Osaka & Amagasaki
Gold medal – first place	2008 Bangkok
Bronze medal – third place	2006 Tashkent
Bronze medal – third place	2012 Dubai
Gold medal – first place	2014 Kerman
Gold medal – first place	2016 Bam
Asian Indoor Games
Gold medal – first place	2005 Bangkok
Futsal Confederations Cup
Gold medal – first place	2009 Tripoli
- * Club domestic league appearances and goals as of 17 January 2022 ‡ National team caps and goals as of 20 May 2015

Vahid Shamsaei (Persian: وحید شمسايی; born 21 September 1975) is an Iranian professional futsal coach and former player. He was a Pivot and he scored 392 goals in international matches. He is currently head coach of Iran national futsal team. Shamsaei has been named AFC Futsal Player of the Year on three occasions (2007, 2008 and 2015). He has also won eight AFC Futsal Championships with Iran. Shamsaei is regarded as the Ali Daei of futsal by the Asian Football Confederation.

== International career ==
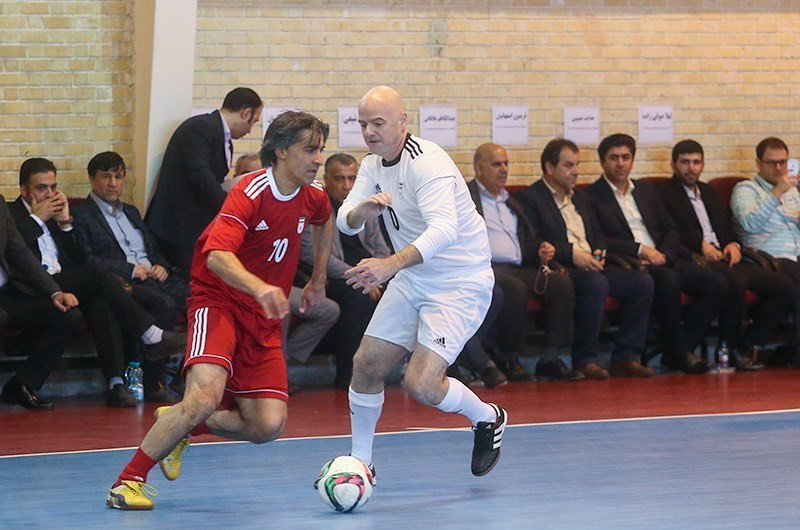
Vahid Shamsaei and Gianni Infantino in Tehran

He is the leading goalscorer for the national team, the seven time Top Goalscorer of the Asian Futsal Championship.

On 19 May 2007 after scoring one goal against Japan in Iran's 4–1 victory in the final of the 2007 AFC Futsal Championship, he scored his 316th national goal. He is officially the world's Top Futsal Goalscorer with 82 goals ahead of Manoel Tobias of Brazil national futsal team, the previous holder of the title with 302 goals.

== Honours ==
=== Player ===
Country

- AFC Futsal Championship
  - Champion (8): 2000, 2001, 2002, 2003, 2004, 2005, 2007, 2008
  - Third place (2): 2006, 2012
- Asian Indoor Games
  - Champion (1): 2005
- Confederations Futsal Cup
  - Champion (1): 2009
- WAFF Futsal Championship
  - Champion (1): 2012

Club

- AFC Futsal Club Championship
  - Champion (2): 2010 (Foolad Mahan) - 2015 (Tasisat Daryaei)
- Iranian Futsal Super League
  - Champions (6): 2007–08 (Tam Iran Khodro) - 2008–09 (Foolad Mahan) - 2009–10 (Foolad Mahan) - 2013–14 (Dabiri) - 2014–15 (Tasisat Daryaei) - 2015–16 (Tasisat Daryaei)
  - Runner-Up (5): 2004–05 (Eram Kish) - 2005–06 (Tam Iran Khodro) - 2011–12 (Giti Pasand) - 2017–18 (Tasisat Daryaei) - 2020–21 (Giti Pasand)

=== Manager ===
- Iranian Futsal Super League
  - Champions (3): 2013-2014 (Dabiri) - 2014–15 (Tasisat Daryaei) - 2015–16 (Tasisat Daryaei)
  - Runner-Up (2): 2017–18 (Tasisat Daryaei) - 2020–21 (Giti Pasand)
- Iran
  - AFC Futsal Championship: 2022 (Runner-Up)
  - AFC Futsal Championship: 2024 (Champion)
  - AFC Futsal Championship: 2026 (Champion)

=== Individual ===
- Best player:
  - AFC Futsal Player of the Year: 2007 - 2008 - 2015
  - MVP AFC Futsal Championship: - 2000 - 2003 - 2007 - 2008
  - MVP AFC Futsal Club Championship: 2010 - 2015
  - MVP Futsal Confederations Cup : 2009
  - International special award (2007–08) shared with Ali Daei (Iran Football Federation Award)
  - Best futsal player of Iran (2007–08)
- Top Goalscorer
  - World's Top Futsal Goalscorer of All Time (392 goals)
  - AFC Futsal Championship: 2001 (31) - 2002 (26) - 2003 (24) - 2004 (32) - 2005 (23) - 2006 (16) - 2008 (13) - 2012 (7)
  - AFC Futsal Championship Top Goalscorer of All Time (194 goals) = 2000 (11) - 2001 (31) - 2002 (26) - 2003 (24) - 2004 (32) - 2005 (23) - 2006 (16) - 2007 (11) - 2008 (13) - 2012 (7)
  - Asian Indoor Games: 2005 (31)
  - AFC Futsal Club Championship, 2010 (17) - 2015 (10)
  - WAFF Futsal Championship: 2012 (8 goals)
  - Iranian Futsal Super League: 2000–01 (Peyman) (34 goals) - 2004–05 (Eram Kish) (38 goals) - 2005–06 (Tam Iran Khodro) (55 goals) - 2008–09 (Foolad Mahan) (32 goals) - 2009–10 (Foolad Mahan) (34 goals)
- Best Manager
  - Iranian Futsal Super League: 2013–14 (Dabiri)
  - Iranian Futsal Super League: 2014–15 (Tasisat Daryaei)

== International goals ==
No.	Date	Venue	Opponent	Score	Result	Competition
1.	10 January 2000	Isfahan, Iran	Russia	1–?	2–3	Friendly
2.	21 May 2006	Tashkent, Uzbekistan	Turkmenistan	2–0	14–0	2006 AFC Futsal Championship
2.	21 May 2006	Tashkent, Uzbekistan	Turkmenistan	5–0	14–0	2006 AFC Futsal Championship
3.	21 May 2006	Tashkent, Uzbekistan	Turkmenistan	8–0	14–0	2006 AFC Futsal Championship
4.	21 May 2006	Tashkent, Uzbekistan	Turkmenistan	10–0	14–0	2006 AFC Futsal Championship
5.	21 May 2006	Tashkent, Uzbekistan	Turkmenistan	11–0	14–0	2006 AFC Futsal Championship
6.	22 May 2006	Tashkent, Uzbekistan	Indonesia	3–0	20–1	2006 AFC Futsal Championship
7.	22 May 2006	Tashkent, Uzbekistan	Indonesia	5–0	20–1	2006 AFC Futsal Championship
8.	22 May 2006	Tashkent, Uzbekistan	Indonesia	9–0	20–1	2006 AFC Futsal Championship
9.	22 May 2006	Tashkent, Uzbekistan	Indonesia	12–0	20–1	2006 AFC Futsal Championship
10.	22 May 2006	Tashkent, Uzbekistan	Indonesia	16–0	20–1	2006 AFC Futsal Championship
11.	22 May 2006	Tashkent, Uzbekistan	Indonesia	17–0	20–1	2006 AFC Futsal Championship
12.	22 May 2006	Tashkent, Uzbekistan	Indonesia	19–0	20–1	2006 AFC Futsal Championship
13.	23 May 2006	Tashkent, Uzbekistan	Thailand	1–1	6–3	2006 AFC Futsal Championship
14.	23 May 2006	Tashkent, Uzbekistan	Thailand	2–2	6–3	2006 AFC Futsal Championship
15.	23 May 2006	Tashkent, Uzbekistan	Thailand	5–2	6–3	2006 AFC Futsal Championship
16.	26 May 2006	Tashkent, Uzbekistan	Japan	1–1	1–5	2006 AFC Futsal Championship
17.	13 May 2007	Amagasaki, Japan	Lebanon	4–2	8–4	2007 AFC Futsal Championship
18.	14 May 2007	Amagasaki, Japan	Malaysia	5–0	15–1	2007 AFC Futsal Championship
19.	14 May 2007	Amagasaki, Japan	Malaysia	6–0	15–1	2007 AFC Futsal Championship
20.	14 May 2007	Amagasaki, Japan	Malaysia	10–1	15–1	2007 AFC Futsal Championship
21.	14 May 2007	Amagasaki, Japan	Malaysia	11–1	15–1	2007 AFC Futsal Championship
22.	14 May 2007	Amagasaki, Japan	Malaysia	13–1	15–1	2007 AFC Futsal Championship
23.	14 May 2007	Amagasaki, Japan	Malaysia	15–1	15–1	2007 AFC Futsal Championship
24.	17 May 2007	Amagasaki, Japan	Australia	4–0	8–0	2007 AFC Futsal Championship
25.	17 May 2007	Amagasaki, Japan	Australia	5–0	8–0	2007 AFC Futsal Championship
26.	18 May 2007	Osaka, Japan	Uzbekistan	7–3	7–3	2007 AFC Futsal Championship
27.	19 May 2007	Osaka, Japan	Japan	3–0	4–1	2007 AFC Futsal Championship
28.	11 May 2008	Bangkok, Thailand	Kuwait	4–0	12–0	2008 AFC Futsal Championship
29.	11 May 2008	Bangkok, Thailand	Kuwait	12–0	12–0	2008 AFC Futsal Championship
30.	12 May 2008	Bangkok, Thailand	China	2–0	8–1	2008 AFC Futsal Championship
31.	12 May 2008	Bangkok, Thailand	China	5–0	8–1	2008 AFC Futsal Championship
32.	13 May 2008	Bangkok, Thailand	Tajikistan	3–0	14–0	2008 AFC Futsal Championship
33.	13 May 2008	Bangkok, Thailand	Tajikistan	?–0	14–0	2008 AFC Futsal Championship
34.	13 May 2008	Bangkok, Thailand	Tajikistan	8–0	14–0	2008 AFC Futsal Championship
35.	13 May 2008	Bangkok, Thailand	Tajikistan	13–0	14–0	2008 AFC Futsal Championship
36.	13 May 2008	Bangkok, Thailand	Tajikistan	14–0	14–0	2008 AFC Futsal Championship
37.	15 May 2008	Bangkok, Thailand	Lebanon	4–0	9–1	2008 AFC Futsal Championship
38.	16 May 2008	Bangkok, Thailand	Japan	1–0	1–0	2008 AFC Futsal Championship
39.	18 May 2008	Bangkok, Thailand	Thailand	2–0	4–0	2008 AFC Futsal Championship
40.	18 May 2008	Bangkok, Thailand	Thailand	3–0	4–0	2008 AFC Futsal Championship
41.	27 April 2008	Urmia, Iran	Kuwait	1–0	9–2	2012 WAFF Futsal Championship
42.	27 April 2008	Urmia, Iran	Kuwait	9––2	9–2	2012 WAFF Futsal Championship
43.	29 April 2012	Urmia, Iran	Palestine	3–0	19–1	2012 WAFF Futsal Championship
44.	29 April 2012	Urmia, Iran	Palestine	11–0	19–1	2012 WAFF Futsal Championship
45.	29 April 2012	Urmia, Iran	Palestine	15–0	19–1	2012 WAFF Futsal Championship
46.	29 April 2012	Urmia, Iran	Palestine	16–1	19–1	2012 WAFF Futsal Championship
47.	29 April 2012	Urmia, Iran	Palestine	18–1	19–1	2012 WAFF Futsal Championship
48.	1 May 2012	Urmia, Iran	Iraq	1–0	7–3	2012 WAFF Futsal Championship
49.	26 May 2012	Dubai, UAE	Qatar	3–0	8–0	2012 AFC Futsal Championship
50.	26 May 2012	Dubai, UAE	Qatar	8–0	8–0	2012 AFC Futsal Championship
51.	27 May 2012	Dubai, UAE	Australia	2–0	9–0	2012 AFC Futsal Championship
52.	27 May 2012	Dubai, UAE	Australia	9–0	9–0	2012 AFC Futsal Championship
53.	30 May 2012	Dubai, UAE	Thailand	1–0	4–5 (a.e.t.)	2012 AFC Futsal Championship
54.	30 May 2012	Dubai, UAE	Thailand	4–4	4–5 (a.e.t.)	2012 AFC Futsal Championship
55.	1 June 2012	Dubai, UAE	Australia	4–0	4–0	2012 AFC Futsal Championship

== Managerial career ==
=== Statistics ===
As of 17 January 2022

Team	From	To	Record							
Team	From	To	G	W	D	L	GF	GA	+/-	Win %
Tasisat Daryaei	2014	2018	57	35	14	8	185	110	+75	61.40
Giti Pasand	2020	2021	22	14	5	3	80	48	+32	63.64
Iran	2022	Present	0	0	0	0	0	0	+0	—

Sporting positions
Preceded by Kenichiro Kogure	Asian Futsaler of the Year; 2007; 2008	Succeeded by Mohammad Taheri
Preceded by Ali Asghar Hassanzadeh	Asian Futsaler of the Year; 2015	Succeeded by Ali Asghar Hassanzadeh
Preceded by Therdsak Chaiman	AFC Futsal Championship Top Scorers; 2001 (31 Goals); 2002 (26 Goals); 2003 (24 Goals); 2004 (33 Goals); 2005 (23 Goals); 2006 (16 Goals)	Succeeded by Kenichiro Kogure
Preceded by Kenichiro Kogure	AFC Futsal Championship Top Scorers; 2008 (13 Goals)	Succeeded by Mohammad Taheri
Preceded by Mohammad Taheri	AFC Futsal Championship Top Scorers; 2012 (7 Goals)	Succeeded by Hossein Tayyebi
Preceded by Anucha Munjarern	AFC Futsal Championship MVP; 2003	Succeeded by Mohammad Reza Heidarian
Preceded by Kenichiro Kogure	AFC Futsal Championship MVP; 2007; 2008	Succeeded by Mohammad Taheri
Preceded by -	AFC Futsal Club Championship Top Scorers; 2010 (17 Goals)	Succeeded by Ali Asghar Hassanzadeh
Preceded by Kaoru Morioka	AFC Futsal Club Championship Top Scorers; 2015 (10 Goals)	Succeeded by Jirawat Sornwichian
Preceded by -	AFC Futsal Club Championship MVP; 2010	Succeeded by Mohammad Keshavarz
Preceded by Kaoru Morioka	AFC Futsal Club Championship MVP; 2015	Succeeded by Farhad Tavakoli
Preceded by Mahmoud Lotfi	Iranian Futsal Super League top scorer 04-05 (38 Goals); 05-06 (55 Goals)	Succeeded by Mohammad Taheri
Preceded by Mohammad Taheri	Iranian Futsal Super League top scorer 08-09 (32 Goals) with Morteza Azimaei; 09-10 (34 Goals)	Succeeded by Masoud Daneshvar
