= Shohada Basij Ray FSC =

Iranian futsal club

- Full name: Shohada Basij Ray Futsal Club
- Founded: 1997
- Chairman: (Iran)
- Head Coach: (Iran)

Shohada Basij Ray Futsal Club (Persian: باشگاه فوتسال شهدای بسیج ری was an Iranian futsal club based in Rey, Iran. The team played in the Iranian Futsal Super League a professional futsal league competition for clubs located at the highest level of the Iranian futsal league system.

Source : FootBall-Tehran
