= 2003–04 Iranian Futsal Super League =

Iranian Futsal Super League
- Season: 2003–04
- Champions: Shensa
- Matches played: 132
- Goals scored: 1,055 (7.99 per match)

The 2003–04 Iranian Futsal Super League will be the first season of the Futsal Super League.

== League standings ==
Pos	Team	Pld	W	D	L	GF	GA	GD	Pts	Qualification or relegation
1	Shensa (C)	22	18	2	2	106	49	+57	56	League Champions
2	Shahid Mansouri	22	12	2	8	81	83	−2	38	
3	Eram Kish	22	10	7	5	101	80	+21	37	
4	Rah Ahan	22	11	4	7	81	77	+4	37	
5	Pas	22	10	5	7	86	70	+16	35	
6	Sadra	22	8	5	9	85	81	+4	29	
7	Esteghlal	22	8	4	10	74	85	−11	28	
8	Shahrvand	22	7	7	8	84	98	−14	28	
9	Persepolis	22	7	5	10	91	100	−9	26	
10	Pegah	22	7	4	11	81	90	−9	25	
11	Chini Hamgam (O)	22	5	4	13	108	114	−6	19	Qualification for the relegation play-offs
12	Shahrdari Tonekabon (R)	22	3	3	16	77	134	−57	12	Qualification for the relegation play-offs

Updated to match(es) played on 13 August 2004. Source: Futsal Planet
Rules for classification: 1) points; 2) goal difference; 3) number of goals scored.
(C) Champions; (O) Play-off winners; (R) Relegated

== Top goalscorers ==
36 Goals

- (Iran) Mahmoud Lotfi (Shahrvand)

== Awards ==
Iranian Futsal Super League
2003–04 champions
Shensa
First title

- Winner: Shensa
- Runners-up: Shahid Mansouri
- Third-Place: Eram Kish
- Top scorer: (Iran) Mahmoud Lotfi (Shahrvand) (36)
