= 2005–06 Iranian Futsal Super League =

Futsal Super League
- Season: 2005–06
- Champions: Shensa
- Relegated: Fajr Ghaem; Sazman Bazargani Gilan
- Matches played: 182
- Goals scored: 1,184 (6.51 per match)

The 2005–06 Iranian Futsal Super League will be the 3rd season of the Futsal Super League.

== League standings ==
| Pos | Team | Pld | W | D | L | GF | GA | GD | Pts | Qualification or relegation |
|---|---|---|---|---|---|---|---|---|---|---|
| 1 | Shensa (C) | 26 | 19 | 4 | 3 | 101 | 61 | +40 | 61 | Qualification for the Asia Futsal Cup |
| 2 | Tam Iran Khodro | 26 | 15 | 6 | 5 | 146 | 90 | +56 | 51 | |
| 3 | Rah Ahan | 26 | 14 | 4 | 8 | 108 | 90 | +18 | 46 | |
| 4 | Post | 26 | 14 | 3 | 9 | 87 | 79 | +8 | 45 | |
| 5 | Elmo Adab | 26 | 13 | 5 | 8 | 95 | 71 | +24 | 44 | |
| 6 | Rah Sari | 26 | 12 | 2 | 12 | 85 | 105 | −20 | 38 | |
| 7 | Sadra | 26 | 11 | 3 | 12 | 83 | 70 | +13 | 36 | |
| 8 | Shahid Mansouri | 26 | 11 | 3 | 12 | 93 | 94 | −1 | 36 | |
| 9 | Sazman Bazargani East Azerbaijan | 26 | 10 | 5 | 11 | 93 | 79 | +14 | 35 | |
| 10 | Azad University | 26 | 9 | 7 | 10 | 80 | 76 | +4 | 34 | |
| 11 | Esteghlal | 26 | 10 | 3 | 13 | 74 | 94 | −20 | 33 | |
| 12 | Eram Kish | 26 | 8 | 3 | 15 | 93 | 101 | −8 | 27 | |
| 13 | Fajr Ghaem (R) | 26 | 8 | 2 | 16 | 90 | 133 | −43 | 26 | Relegation to the 1st Division |
| 14 | Sazman Bazargani Gilan (R) | 26 | 3 | 0 | 23 | 49 | 134 | −85 | 9 | Relegation to the 1st Division |

Updated to match(es) played on 2 February 2007. Source: Futsal Planet
Rules for classification: 1) points; 2) goal difference; 3) number of goals scored.
(C) Champions; (R) Relegated

== Results table ==
| Home \ Away | UNI | ELM | ERM | EST | FAJ | POS | RAH | RAS | SAD | SBA | SBG | MAN | SNA | TAM |
|---|---|---|---|---|---|---|---|---|---|---|---|---|---|---|
| Azad University | | 2–2 | 2–2 | 2–4 | 11–4 | 4–0 | 2–2 | 4–1 | 2–2 | 3–5 | 6–2 | 4–6 | 1–7 | 3–2 |
| Elmo Adab | 5–2 | | 2–1 | 3–0 | 6–2 | 2–4 | 4–5 | 4–2 | 2–3 | 3–0 | 4–0 | 1–0 | 3–4 | 4–5 |
| Eram Kish | 2–4 | 3–3 | | 3–4 | 9–4 | 4–1 | 5–4 | 6–2 | 1–2 | 5–4 | 5–0 | 8–4 | 2–4 | 2–6 |
| Esteghlal | 3–6 | 3–8 | 3–2 | | 2–0 | 2–4 | 6–7 | 2–2 | 1–1 | 4–4 | 3–0 | 4–3 | 3–2 | 3–2 |
| Fajr Ghaem | 2–1 | 3–6 | 3–5 | 2–3 | | 4–3 | 4–3 | 5–6 | 3–0 | 2–4 | 7–4 | 7–3 | 6–6 | 4–3 |
| Post | 2–2 | 3–3 | 3–1 | 4–1 | 6–3 | | 2–4 | 4–2 | 5–4 | 4–3 | 6–0 | 5–4 | 4–4 | 6–3 |
| Rah Ahan | 3–2 | 0–4 | 5–5 | 5–4 | 14–7 | 1–0 | | 3–1 | 2–1 | 2–2 | 8–1 | 7–13 | 3–4 | 3–7 |
| Rah Sari | 0–2 | 6–4 | 5–4 | 6–5 | 2–4 | 4–5 | 3–2 | | 2–0 | 3–2 | 10–1 | 1–0 | 4–2 | 8–8 |
| Sadra | 6–2 | 3–5 | 9–4 | 4–2 | 6–2 | 3–4 | 2–4 | 6–3 | | 3–2 | 6–1 | 2–3 | 0–1 | 5–5 |
| Sazman Bazargani East Azerbaijan | 2–2 | 2–2 | 3–1 | 8–2 | 10–4 | 2–4 | 3–3 | 6–0 | 3–2 | | 7–3 | 6–4 | 2–3 | 2–5 |
| Sazman Bazargani Gilan | 0–2 | 4–5 | 1–0 | 2–4 | 4–3 | 3–2 | 0–7 | 5–6 | 2–6 | 2–6 | | 0–3 | 1–6 | 3–7 |
| Shahid Mansouri | 5–4 | 4–2 | 5–4 | 4–3 | 2–2 | 5–2 | 3–5 | 2–3 | 1–3 | 3–2 | 6–5 | | 2–3 | 5–5 |
| Shensa | 2–2 | 5–3 | 5–4 | 3–2 | 7–1 | 6–2 | 3–0 | 4–2 | 2–1 | 2–1 | 4–1 | 5–2 | | 4–4 |
| Tam Iran Khodro | 5–3 | 5–5 | 13–5 | 7–1 | 7–2 | 5–2 | 2–6 | 15–1 | 6–3 | 8–2 | 5–4 | 1–1 | 5–3 | |

Updated to match(es) played on 16 September 2019. Source: Futsal Planet
Legend: Blue = home team win; Yellow = draw; Red = away team win.

== Awards ==
Iranian Futsal Super League
2005–06 champions
Shensa
Second title

- Winner: Shensa
- Runners-up: Tam Iran Khodro
- Third-Place: Rah Ahan
- Top scorer: Vahid Shamsaei (Tam Iran Khodro) (55)
