= 2007–08 Iranian Futsal Super League =

Futsal Super League
- Season: 2007–08
- Champions: Tam Iran Khodro
- Relegated: Rah Ahan; Shensa
- Matches played: 169
- Goals scored: 1,162 (6.88 per match)
- Biggest home win: Tam Iran Khodro 13-2 Zoghalsang
- Biggest away win: Zoghalsang 0-8 Azad University
- Highest scoring: Tam Iran Khodro 13-2 Zoghalsang

The 2007–08 Iranian Futsal Super League will be the 4th season of the Futsal Super League.

== League standings ==
Pos	Team	Pld	W	D	L	GF	GA	GD	Pts	Qualification or relegation
1	Tam Iran Khodro (C)	25	18	5	2	131	57	+74	59	League Champions
2	Shahid Mansouri	25	17	6	2	133	69	+64	57	
3	Foolad Mahan	25	15	2	8	87	70	+17	47	
4	Eram Kish	25	12	5	8	87	74	+13	41	
5	Elmo Adab	25	11	6	8	77	65	+12	39	
6	Sazman Bazargani	25	11	6	8	83	75	+8	39	
7	Azad University	25	8	7	10	75	76	−1	31	
8	Rah Sari	25	8	4	13	78	108	−30	28	
9	Esteghlal	25	7	4	14	66	90	−24	25	
10	Zoghalsang	25	7	4	14	83	132	−49	25	
11	Poushineh Baft	25	6	6	13	80	89	−9	24	
12	Sadra	25	6	6	13	69	92	−23	24	
13	Shensa (R)	13	7	1	5	42	39	+3	22 (Note: Relegation to the 1st Division issued by Iranian Football Federation.)	Relegation to the 1st Division
14	Rah Ahan (R)	25	4	2	19	71	126	−55	14	Relegation to the 1st Division

Updated to match(es) played on 1 March 2008. Source: Futsal Planet
Rules for classification: 1) points; 2) goal difference; 3) number of goals scored.
(C) Champions; (R) Relegated

== Results table ==
Home \ Away	UNI	ELM	ERM	EST	MAH	BAF	RAH	RAS	SAD	SBA	MAN	SNA	TAM	ZOG
Azad University		2–5	3–3	4–4	1–2	3–2	2–1	3–4	6–1	5–5	2–6	3–4	2–4	3–2
Elmo Adab	3–1		6–2	6–4	1–1	4–3	4–2	2–5	3–3	3–1	3–3	5–2	0–0	6–3
Eram Kish	7–3	3–1		5–2	2–1	2–0	4–2	10–3	5–3	1–2	2–2	5–0	4–6	1–1
Esteghlal	1–2	1–1	2–2		2–4	1–6	1–2	4–1	5–1	2–2	2–4	1–3	1–2	5–2
Foolad Mahan	5–4	3–2	6–4	3–2		5–7	11–2	6–7	1–2	3–1	6–2		3–2	3–0
Poushineh Baft	2–2	2–2	4–7	3–4	2–3		4–3	6–2	2–2	1–1	5–5		2–0	3–4
Rah Ahan	2–2	3–2	1–2	3–4	4–7	4–7		6–5	2–3	2–3	4–7	2–3	4–9	5–8
Rah Sari	1–5	2–1	5–3	4–5	2–0	6–6	2–3		8–6	2–2	4–8	3–0 (Note: Shensa received a technical loss of 3–0 to Rah Sari.)	3–3	4–5
Sadra	1–3	2–4	3–4	4–1	2–4	4–3	4–2	0–0		2–2	3–4		3–5	11–3
Sazman Bazargani	7–2	5–3	5–1	3–0	1–4	3–1	3–2	6–1	2–2		5–4		4–5	9–4
Shahid Mansouri	2–2	3–1	6–2	11–1	4–2	4–1	12–1	7–2	4–1	9–4		6–3	4–4	8–2
Shensa					6–1	3–4			3–3	7–2			4–3	4–1
Tam Iran Khodro	2–2	6–2	3–2	6–4	5–0	5–2	10–2	9–1	9–0	5–3	2–2			13–2
Zoghalsang	0–8	3–7	4–4	6–7	3–3	4–2	7–7	2–1	7–3	4–2	5–6		1–7	

Updated to match(es) played on 1 March 2008. Source: Futsal Planet
Legend: Blue = home team win; Yellow = draw; Red = away team win.

== Top goalscorers ==
52 Goals

- (Iran) Mohammad Taheri (Shahid Mansouri)

== Awards ==
Iranian Futsal Super League
2007–08 champions
Tam Iran Khodro
Second title

- Winner: Tam Iran Khodro
- Runners-up: Shahid Mansouri
- Third-Place: Foolad Mahan
- Top scorer: (Iran) Mohammad Taheri (Shahid Mansouri) (52)

== See also ==
- 2007–08 Iran Futsal's 1st Division
- 2007–08 Persian Gulf Cup
- 2007–08 Azadegan League
- 2007–08 Iran Football's 2nd Division
- 2007–08 Iran Football's 3rd Division
- 2007–08 Hazfi Cup
- Iranian Super Cup
