= AFC Futsal Club Championship records and statistics =

This page details statistics of the AFC Futsal Club Championship.

== General performance ==
=== By nation ===
Nation	Winners	Runners-up	Total
Iran	4	4	8
Japan	4	0	4
Thailand	2	1	3
Vietnam	0	1	1
Qatar	0	1	1
Iraq	0	1	1
Kuwait	0	1	1
Uzbekistan	0	1	1

=== Winners by club ===
Club	Winner	Runner-up	Years won	Years runner-up
(Japan) Nagoya Oceans	**4**	0	**2011**, **2014**, **2016**, **2019**	
(Thailand) Chonburi Bluewave	**2**	1	**2013**, **2017**	2014
(Iran) Giti Pasand	**1**	2	**2012**	2013, 2017
(Iran) Mes Sungun	**1**	1	**2018**	2019
(Iran) Foolad Mahan	**1**	0	**2010**	
(Iran) Tasisat Daryaei	**1**	0	**2015**	
(Qatar) Al-Sadd	0	1		2010
(Iran) Shahid Mansouri	0	1		2011
(Uzbekistan) Ardus Tashkent	0	1		2012
(Kuwait) Al-Qadsia	0	1		2015
(Iraq) Naft Al-Wasat	0	1		2016
(Vietnam) Thái Sơn Nam	0	1		2018

=== All-time table ===
As of 2019:

Best finish	Winner	Runners-up	Semifinals	Quarterfinals

Rank	Club	Seasons	Games	W	D	L	GF	GA	GD	Pts	W	F	SF	QF
1	(Japan) Nagoya Oceans	9	43	23	6	8	176	104	+72	93	4		3	1
2	(Thailand) Chonburi Blue Wave	8	32	19	7	6	130	79	+51	64	2	1	1	1
3	(Vietnam) Thái Sơn Nam	6	29	16	4	9	107	89	+18	52		1	3	
4	(Iran) Giti Pasand	3	15	12	1	2	58	22	+36	37	1	2		
5	(Iraq) Naft Al-Wasat	5	23	11	4	8	88	75	+13	37		1	2	1
6	(Iran) Mes Sungun	2	12	10	0	2	61	23	+38	30	1	1		
7	(Lebanon) Bank of Beirut	5	19	8	3	8	78	72	+6	27			1	2
8	(Qatar) Al Rayyan	5	22	7	2	13	61	89	-28	23			3	1
9	(Iran) Tasisat Daryaei	2	8	7	1	0	45	17	+28	22	1			1
10	(Qatar) Al Sadd	3	12	6	0	6	57	44	+13	18		1		1
11	(China) Shenzhen Nanling	5	18	5	3	10	55	76	-21	18			2	1
12	(Thailand) Thai Port	2	10	5	2	3	42	35	+7	17			1	1
13	(Iran) Foolad Mahan	1	5	5	0	0	36	9	+27	15	1			
14	(Kyrgyzstan) Osh EREM	3	10	5	0	5	26	38	-12	15				1
15	(United Arab Emirates) Al Dhafrah	3	10	4	1	5	29	25	+4	13				1
16	(Indonesia) Vamos Mataram	3	11	4	1	6	34	36	-2	13				2
17	(Iran) Shahid Mansouri	1	5	4	0	1	22	17	+5	12		1		
18	(Kuwait) Al Qadsia	2	8	3	2	3	38	37	+1	11		1		
19	(Uzbekistan) Ardus	3	11	3	2	6	34	35	-1	11		1		
20	(Uzbekistan) AGMK	4	14	3	1	10	36	66	-30	10			1	1
21	(Lebanon) Al Sadaka	2	8	2	2	4	24	24	0	8			1	
22	(Iran) Dabiri	1	5	2	1	2	20	17	+3	7			1	
23	(Lebanon) Pro's Cafe	1	4	2	1	1	19	18	+1	7				
24	(China) Wuhan Dilong	1	4	2	0	2	23	22	+1	6				
25	(Vietnam) Sanna Khánh Hòa	1	3	2	0	1	8	8	0	6				1
26	(United Arab Emirates) Dibba Al-Hisn	1	5	1	2	2	11	14	-3	5			1	
27	(China) Dalian Yuan Dynasty	2	5	1	2	2	9	17	-8	5				
28	(Kyrgyzstan) MFC Emgek	1	3	1	1	1	11	9	+2	4				1
29	(Lebanon) All Sports	1	3	1	1	1	11	10	+1	4				
30	(Japan) Shriker Osaka	1	3	1	0	2	9	8	+1	3				1
31	(Kuwait) Yarmouk	1	3	1	0	2	10	10	0	3				
32	(Tajikistan) Soro Company	1	3	1	0	2	12	18	-6	3				
33	(Qatar) Al-Sailiya	1	3	1	0	2	7	13	-6	3				
34	(Uzbekistan) Lokomotiv Tashkent	2	5	1	0	4	15	25	-10	3				
35	(Kyrgyzstan) AUB-Altyn-Tash	1	3	1	0	2	9	20	-11	3				
36	(Tajikistan) Sipar Khujand	1	3	1	0	2	6	21	-15	3				
37	(Iraq) Al Karkh	1	3	0	1	2	11	15	-4	1				
38	(Lebanon) Al Mayadeen	1	2	0	1	1	4	8	-4	1				
39	(China) Zhejiang Dragon	1	3	0	1	2	6	18	-12	1				
40	(Australia) Vic Vipers	4	11	0	1	10	17	55	-38	1				
41	(South Korea) FS Seoul	1	3	0	0	3	5	11	-6	0				
42	(Tajikistan) Disi Invest	1	2	0	0	2	3	9	-6	0				
43	(Chinese Taipei) Taiwan Power	1	2	0	0	2	0	7	-7	0				
44	(Kuwait) Kazma	1	3	0	0	3	5	14	-9	0				
45	(Australia) NSW Thunder	1	4	0	0	4	15	27	-12	0				
46	(Uzbekistan) Stroitel Zarafshan	1	3	0	0	3	7	22	-15	0				
47	(United Arab Emirates) Al-Khaleej	1	2	0	0	2	2	17	-15	0				
48	(Myanmar) Victoria University College	2	6	0	0	6	10	28	-18	0				
49	(South Korea) Jeonju MAG	1	3	0	0	3	4	25	-21	0				

=== All-time table (nations) ===
As of 2019 AFC Futsal Club Championship:

Rank	Nation	Part	M	W	D	L	GF	GA	GD	Points
1	Iran	10	50	40	3	7	242	105	+137	123
2	Japan	10	46	30	6	10	185	112	+73	96
3	Thailand	10	42	24	9	9	172	114	+58	81
4	Vietnam	7	32	18	4	10	115	97	+18	58
5	Lebanon	10	36	13	8	15	136	132	+4	47
6	Qatar	9	37	14	2	21	125	146	-21	44
7	Iraq	6	26	11	5	10	99	90	+9	38
8	China	9	30	8	6	16	93	133	-40	30
9	Uzbekistan	10	33	7	3	23	92	148	-56	24
10	Kyrgyzstan	5	16	7	1	8	46	67	-21	22
11	United Arab Emirates	5	17	5	3	9	42	56	-14	18
12	Kuwait	4	14	4	2	8	53	61	-8	14
13	Indonesia	3	11	4	1	6	34	36	-2	13
14	Tajikistan	3	8	2	0	6	21	48	-27	6
15	Australia	5	15	0	1	14	32	82	-50	1
16	Chinese Taipei	1	2	0	0	2	0	7	-7	0
17	Myanmar	2	6	0	0	6	10	28	-18	0
18	South Korea	2	6	0	0	6	9	36	-27	0

=== Number of participating clubs ===
The following is a list of clubs that have played in the group stages. The list is arrayed in alphabetical order of nation.

Nation	Total #	GS #	GU #	Clubs	Group stage years	Qualification years
Australia	1	0	1	Dural Warriors		2013
Australia	1	0	1	Maccabi Hakoah		2012
Australia	1	1	0	NSW Thunder	2010	
Australia	4	4	0	Vic Vipers	2014, 2016, 2017, 2018	
China PR	2	2	0	Dalian Yuan Dynasty	2016, 2018	
China PR	1	0	1	Guangzhou Baiyunshan		2012
China PR	5	5	0	Shenzhen Nanling	**2013**, **2014**, 2015, 2017, **2019**	
China PR	1	1	0	Wuhan Dilong	2010	
China PR	1	1	0	Zhejiang Dragon	2011	
Chinese Taipei	1	0	1	Tainan City		2013
Chinese Taipei	1	1	0	Taiwan Power Company	2016	
Indonesia	1	0	1	Harimau Rawa		2011
Indonesia	2	0	2	Pelindo		2012, 2013
Indonesia	3	3	0	Vamos Mataram	2017, **2018**, **2019**	
Iran	1	1	0	Dabiri	**2014**	
Iran	1	1	0	Foolad Mahan	**2010**	
Iran	3	3	0	Giti Pasand	**2012**, **2013**, **2017**	
Iran	2	2	0	Mes Sungun	**2018**, **2019**	
Iran	1	1	0	Shahid Mansouri	**2011**	
Iran	2	2	0	Tasisat Daryaei	**2015**, **2016**	
Iraq	2	1	1	Al Karkh	2011	2012
Iraq	6	5	1	Naft Al Wasat	**2015**, **2016**, **2017**, **2018**, 2019	2013
Japan	9	9	0	Nagoya Oceans	**2010**, **2011**, **2012**, **2013**, **2014**, **2015**, **2016**, **2018**, **2019**	
Japan	1	1	0	Shriker Osaka	**2017**	
Kuwait	1	0	1	Al Salmiya		2013
Kuwait	2	2	0	Al Qadsia	2014, **2015**	
Kuwait	1	1	0	Yarmouk	2012	
Kuwait	1	1	0	Kazma	2019	
Kyrgyzstan	1	1	0	AUB-Altyn-Tash	2010	
Kyrgyzstan	1	0	1	Dordoi		2013
Kyrgyzstan	1	1	0	MFC Emgek	**2015**	
Kyrgyzstan	1	0	1	Nalogovik Bishkek		2012
Kyrgyzstan	3	3	0	Osh EREM	2017, **2018**, 2019	
Lebanon	1	1	0	Al Mayadeen	2016	
Lebanon	2	2	0	Al Sadaka	**2011**, 2013	
Lebanon	1	1	0	All Sports	2012	
Lebanon	5	5	0	Bank of Beirut	2014, **2015**, **2017**, **2018**, **2019**	
Lebanon	1	1	0	Pro's Cafe	2010	
Myanmar	1	0	1	ACE		2012
Myanmar	2	2	0	Victoria University College	2018, 2019	
Philippines	1	0	1	Pasargad		2013
Qatar	5	5	0	Al Rayyan	**2011**, **2012**, **2015**, **2017**, 2019	
Qatar	3	3	0	Al Sadd	**2010**, 2013, **2016**	
Qatar	1	1	0	Al Sailiya	2018	
South Korea	1	1	0	Jeonju MAG	2018	
South Korea	1	1	0	Seoul	2019	
Tajikistan	1	1	0	Disi Invest	2017	
Tajikistan	1	1	0	Sipar Khujand	2018	
Tajikistan	1	1	0	Soro Company	2019	
Thailand	8	8	0	Chonburi Blue Wave	2011, 2012, **2013**, **2014**, 2015, **2016**, **2017**, **2018**	
Thailand	2	2	0	Thai Port	**2010**, **2019**	
United Arab Emirates	3	3	0	Al Dhafrah	**2017**, 2018, 2019	
United Arab Emirates	1	1	0	Al Khaleej	2015	
United Arab Emirates	2	0	2	Al Wasl		2012, 2013
United Arab Emirates	1	1	0	Dibba Al Hissin	**2016**	
Uzbekistan	4	4	0	AGMK	**2016**, 2017, 2018, **2019**	
Uzbekistan	3	3	0	Ardus	2011, **2012**, 2013	
Uzbekistan	2	2	0	Lokomotiv Tashkent	2014, 2015	
Uzbekistan	1	1	0	Stroitel Zarafshan	2010	
Vietnam	1	1	0	Sanna Khánh Hòa	**2016**	
Vietnam	6	6	0	Thái Sơn Nam	2012, 2013, **2015**, **2017**, **2018**, **2019**	

Club in bold: qualified for knockout phase

== Clubs ==
=== By semifinal appearances ===
Club	No. of appearances	Years in
(Japan) Nagoya Oceans	7	2010, 2011, 2012, 2013, 2014, 2016, 2019
(Thailand) Chonburi Blue Wave	4	2013, 2014, 2016, 2017
(Vietnam) Thái Sơn Nam	4	2015, 2017, 2018, 2019
(Qatar) Al Rayyan	3	2011, 2012, 2017
(Iran) Giti Pasand	3	2012, 2013, 2017
(Iraq) Naft Al Wasat	3	2015, 2016, 2018
(China) Shenzhen Nanling	2	2013, 2014
(Iran) Mes Sungun	2	2018, 2019
(Thailand) Thai Port	1	2010
(Iran) Foolad Mahan	1	2010
(Qatar) Al Sadd	1	2010
(Iran) Shahid Mansouri	1	2011
(Lebanon) Al Sadaka	1	2011
(Uzbekistan) Ardus Tashkent	1	2012
(Iran) Dabiri	1	2014
(Iran) Tasisat Daryaei	1	2015
(Kuwait) Al Qadsia	1	2015
(United Arab Emirates) Dibba Al Hisn	1	2016
(Lebanon) Bank of Beirut	1	2018
(Uzbekistan) AGMK	1	2019

=== Unbeaten ===
- Six clubs have won either the AFC Futsal Club Championship unbeaten:
  - Foolad Mahan had 5 wins in 2010.
  - Nagoya Oceans had 5 wins in 2011.
  - Giti Pasand had 5 wins in 2012.
  - Tasisat Daryaei had 5 wins in 2015.
  - Chonburi Bluewave had 5 wins in 2017.
  - Mes Sungun had 6 wins in 2018.
  - Nagoya Oceans had 6 wins in 2019.

=== Consecutive participations ===
- Chonburi Bluewave hold the record number of consecutive participations in the AFC Futsal Club Championship with 8 from 2011 to 2018.

=== Biggest wins ===
Date	Club win	Score	Club lose	Venue	Location
Mar 8, 2010	Foolad Mahan (Iran)	12-1	(Uzbekistan) Stroitel Zarafshan	(Iran) Pirouzi Arena	Isfahan
Mar 5, 2010	Al Sadd (Qatar)	11-3	(Australia) NSW Thunder	(Iran) Pirouzi Arena	Isfahan
Mar 5, 2010	Foolad Mahan (Iran)	8-1	(Kyrgyzstan) AUB-Altyn-Tash	(Iran) Pirouzi Arena	Isfahan
Jun 26, 2011	Nagoya Oceans (Japan)	8-1	(China) Zhejiang Dragon	(Qatar) Al-Rayyan Main Hall	Doha
July 01, 2012	Giti Pasand (Iran)	8-0	(Vietnam) Thái Sơn Nam	(Kuwait) Al Yarmouk Futsal Stadium	Kuwait City
July 02, 2012	Giti Pasand (Iran)	7-0	(Qatar) Al Rayyan	(Kuwait) Al Yarmouk Futsal Stadium	Kuwait City
July 02, 2012	Yarmouk (Kuwait)	6-0	(Vietnam) Thái Sơn Nam	(Kuwait) Al Yarmouk Futsal Stadium	Kuwait City
July 03, 2012	Ardus Tashkent (Uzbekistan)	9-2	(Thailand) GH Bank RBAC	(Kuwait) Al Arabi SC Futsal Stadium	Kuwait City
April 11, 2013	Shenzhen Nanling (China)	10-2	(Philippines) Pasargad	(Malaysia) Panasonic Sports Complex	Shah Alam
April 12, 2013	Chonburi Blue Wave (Thailand)	10-2	(Philippines) Pasargad	(Malaysia) Panasonic Sports Complex	Shah Alam
April 15, 2013	Chonburi Blue Wave (Thailand)	8-1	(Australia) Dural Warriors	(Malaysia) Panasonic Sports Complex	Shah Alam
April 16, 2013	Chonburi Blue Wave (Thailand)	7-1	(China) Shenzhen Nanling	(Malaysia) Panasonic Sports Complex	Shah Alam
August 26, 2014	Nagoya Oceans (Japan)	6-0	(Australia) Vic Vipers	(China) Shuangliu Sports Centre	Chengdu
July 31, 2015	Tasisat Daryaei (Iran)	8-1	(United Arab Emirates) Al-Khaleej	(Iran) Naghsh-e-Jahan Stadium	Isfahan
August 1, 2015	Al-Qadsia (Kuwait)	9-1	(United Arab Emirates) Al-Khaleej	(Iran) Naghsh-e-Jahan Stadium	Isfahan
July 21, 2017	Chonburi Blue Wave (Thailand)	9-0	(Lebanon) Bank of Beirut	(Vietnam) Phú Thọ Indoor Stadium	Ho Chi Minh City
July 22, 2017	Giti Pasand (Iran)	7-0	(China) Shenzhen Nanling	(Vietnam) Phú Thọ Indoor Stadium	Ho Chi Minh City
July 22, 2017	Thái Sơn Nam (Vietnam)	9-2	(Australia) Vic Vipers	(Vietnam) Phú Thọ Indoor Stadium	Ho Chi Minh City
July 28, 2017	Chonburi Blue Wave (Thailand)	6-0	(Vietnam) Thái Sơn Nam	(Vietnam) Phú Thọ Indoor Stadium	Ho Chi Minh City
August 1, 2018	Vamos Mataram (Indonesia)	8-1	(Myanmar) Victoria University College	(Indonesia) GOR UNY Indoor Stadium	Yogyakarta
August 1, 2018	Thái Sơn Nam (Vietnam)	10-1	(South Korea) Jeonju MAG FC	(Indonesia) GOR UNY Indoor Stadium	Yogyakarta
August 2, 2018	Chonburi Bluewave (Thailand)	9-2	(Australia) Vic Vipers	(Indonesia) GOR UNY Indoor Stadium	Yogyakarta
August 2, 2018	Mes Sungun (Iran)	9-2	(Tajikistan) Sipar Khujand	(Indonesia) GOR UNY Indoor Stadium	Yogyakarta
August 3, 2018	Al-Dhafrah (United Arab Emirates)	9-2	(South Korea) Jeonju MAG FC	(Indonesia) GOR UNY Indoor Stadium	Yogyakarta
August 4, 2018	Mes Sungun (Iran)	9-1	(Uzbekistan) AGMK	(Indonesia) GOR UNY Indoor Stadium	Yogyakarta
August 4, 2018	Bank of Beirut (Lebanon)	11-2	(Tajikistan) Sipar Khujand	(Indonesia) GOR UNY Indoor Stadium	Yogyakarta
August 8, 2019	Mes Sungun (Iran)	8-2	(Kuwait) Kazma	(Thailand) Bangkok Arena	Bangkok

== Players ==
=== All-time top goalscorers ===
As of August 8, 2021

excluding qualifying games

Player	Clubs	Goals
(Iran) Ali Asghar Hassanzadeh	(Iran) Foolad Mahan, (Qatar) Al Rayyan٬ (Iran) Tasisat Daryaei, (Iran) Giti Pasand, (Iran) Mes Sungun, (China) Shenzhen Nanling	33
(Thailand) Suphawut Thueanklang	(Thailand) Chonburi Blue Wave, (Lebanon) Bank of Beirut	33
(Iran) Vahid Shamsaei	(Iran) Foolad Mahan٬ (Iran) Tasisat Daryaei	29
(Thailand) Jirawat Sornwichian	(Thailand) Chonburi Blue Wave	29
(Japan) Kaoru Morioka	(Japan) Nagoya Oceans	28
(Iran) Hossein Tayyebi	(Iran) Giti Pasand, (Iran) Tasisat Daryaei, (Vietnam) Thái Sơn Nam, (Iran) Mes Sungun	25
(Iran) Mahdi Javid	(Iran) Giti Pasand, (Lebanon) Bank of Beirut, (Iran) Mes Sungun	22
(Iran) Ahmad Esmaeilpour	(Iran) Shahid Mansouri, (Iran) Giti Pasand, (China) Shenzhen Nanling	20
(Iran) Ghodrat Bahadori	(Iran) Tasisat Daryaei٬ (Iraq) Naft Al Wasat	19
(Japan) Yoshio Sakai	(Japan) Nagoya Oceans	18
(Lebanon) Khaled Takaji	(Lebanon) Pro's Cafe, (Lebanon) Al-Sadaka, (Lebanon) All Sports, (Lebanon) Al Mayadeen	16
(Brazil) Rudimar Venâncio	(Iran) Giti Pasand, (Thailand) Chonburi Blue Wave	15
(Iran) Zahir Kamyab	(Qatar) Al Sadd	15
(Iran) Farhad Fakhimzadeh	(Iran) Dabiri, (Iran) Mes Sungun	14
(Iran) Mohammad Taheri	(Iran) Foolad Mahan, (Qatar) Al Rayyan, (Iran) Giti Pasand, (Kuwait) Al Qadsia	14
(Iran) Farhad Tavakoli	(Iraq) Naft Al Wasat	13
(Thailand) Nattawut Madyalan	(Thailand) Thai Port, (Thailand) Chonburi Blue Wave	13
(Japan) Yoshikawa Tomoki	(Japan) Nagoya Oceans	13
(Iran) Mohammad Nasser Safari	(Iraq) Naft Al Wasat, (Qatar) Al Sailiya, (Qatar) Al Rayyan	12
(Lebanon) Ahmad Kheir El Dine	(Lebanon) Bank of Beirut	12
(Iraq) Waleed Khalid	(Iraq) Naft Al Wasat	12
(Lebanon) Ali El Homsi	(Lebanon) Al-Sadaka, (Lebanon) Pro's Cafe, (Lebanon) All Sports, (Lebanon) Bank of Beirut	12
(Lebanon) Karim Abou Zeid	(Lebanon) Al-Sadaka, (Lebanon) Bank of Beirut, (United Arab Emirates) Dibba Al Hisn	12
(Japan) Wataru Kitahara	(Japan) Nagoya Oceans	12
(Vietnam) Nguyễn Minh Trí	(Vietnam) Thái Sơn Nam	11
(Japan) Bruno Takashi	(Japan) Nagoya Oceans, (Lebanon) All Sports, (Vietnam) Thái Sơn Nam, (China) Shenzhen Nanling, (United Arab Emirates) Al Dhafra	11
(Japan) Shimizu Kazuya	(Vietnam) Thái Sơn Nam	10
(Thailand) Kritsada Wongkaeo	(Thailand) Chonburi Blue Wave	10
(Kuwait) Abdulrahman Al Tawail	(Kuwait) Yarmouk, (Kuwait) Al Qadsia, (Vietnam) Thái Sơn Nam	10
(Japan) Rafael Henmi	(Japan) Nagoya Oceans, (United Arab Emirates) Al Dhafra	10
(Azerbaijan) Vassoura	(United Arab Emirates) Al Dhafra	9
(Vietnam) Trần Văn Vũ	(Vietnam) Thái Sơn Nam	9
(Uzbekistan) Dilshod Irsaliev	(Uzbekistan) Ardus Tashkent, (Uzbekistan) Almalyk	9
(Japan) Watanabe Tomoaki	(Japan) Nagoya Oceans	9
(Japan) Kenichiro Kogure	(Japan) Nagoya Oceans	9
(Brazil) Rodriguinho	(Qatar) Al Sadd	9

=== Top scorer awards ===
- Vahid Shamsaei (Foolad Mahan) has the record for most goals in one season with 17 in 2010
- Kaoru Morioka (Nagoya Oceans) has the record for fewest goals in one season with 5 in 2014
- Iranian players have received the most awards with 5:
  - Vahid Shamsaei in 2010 and 2015
  - Ali Asghar Hassanzadeh in 2011
  - Ahmad Esmaeilpour in 2012
  - Mahdi Javid in 2018

==== List of hat-tricks ====
Player	For	Against	Result	Date
(Brazil) Rodriguinho	(Qatar) Al-Sadd	(Lebanon) Pro's Cafe	8 – 6	2010-3-4
(Lebanon) Khaled Takaji	(Lebanon) Pro's Cafe	(Qatar) Al-Sadd	6 – 8	2010-3-4
(Iran) Zahir Kamyab^{4}	(Qatar) Al-Sadd	(Australia) NSW Thunder	11 – 3	2010-3-5
(Iran) Vahid Shamsaei^{4}	(Iran) Foolad Mahan	(Kyrgyzstan) AUB-Altyn-Tash	8 – 1	2010-3-5
(Japan) Kaoru Morioka	(Japan) Nagoya Oceans	(Kyrgyzstan) AUB-Altyn-Tash	8 – 3	2010-3-6
(Iran) Zahir Kamyab	(Qatar) Al-Sadd	(Thailand) Thai Port	16 – 2	2010-3-6
(Iran) Zahir Kamyab^{4}	(Qatar) Al-Sadd	(China) Wuhan Dilong	6 – 11	2010-3-8
(China) Li Xin	(China) Wuhan Dilong	(Qatar) Al-Sadd	11 – 6	2010-3-8
(China) Zhang Xi	(China) Wuhan Dilong	(Qatar) Al-Sadd	11 – 6	2010-3-8
(Thailand) Ukrit Taengtung	(Thailand) Thai Port	(Australia) NSW Thunder	6 – 5	2010-3-8
(Iran) Vahid Shamsaei^{6}	(Iran) Foolad Mahan	(Uzbekistan) Stroitel Zarafshan	12 – 1	2010-3-8
(Thailand) Ulid Rossanakarn^{4}	(Thailand) Thai Port	(China) Wuhan Dilong	9 – 5	2010-3-9
(Thailand) Nattawut Madyalan	(Thailand) Thai Port	(China) Wuhan Dilong	9 – 5	2010-3-9
(Uzbekistan) Farruh Zakirov	(Uzbekistan) Stroitel Zarafshan	(Kyrgyzstan) AUB-Altyn-Tash	4 – 5	2010-3-9
(Iran) Vahid Shamsaei	(Iran) Foolad Mahan	(Thailand) Thai Port	5 – 3	2010-3-11
(Iraq) Hashim Khalid	(Iraq) Al-Karkh	(Qatar) Al-Rayyan	5 – 6	2011-6-26
(Japan) Rafael Sakai	(Japan) Nagoya Oceans	(Qatar) Al-Rayyan	8 – 3	2011-6-28
(Iran) Ali Asghar Hassanzadeh	(Qatar) Al-Rayyan	(Japan) Nagoya Oceans	3 – 8	2011-6-28
(Uzbekistan) Dilshod Irsaliev^{4}	(Uzbekistan) Ardus Tashkent	(Thailand) GH Bank RBAC	9 – 2	2012-7-3
(Iran) Ahmad Esmaeilpour	(Iran) Giti Pasand	(Kuwait) Yarmouk	5 – 1	2012-7-3
(Iran) Ahmad Esmaeilpour	(Iran) Giti Pasand	(Japan) Nagoya Oceans	6 – 3	2012-7-5
(Japan) Kaoru Morioka^{4}	(Japan) Nagoya Oceans	(Vietnam) Thai Son Nam	7 – 2	2013-8-28
(Japan) Kaoru Morioka	(Japan) Nagoya Oceans	(China) Shenzhen Nanling	6 – 4	2013-9-1
(Brazil) Ximbinha	(Japan) Nagoya Oceans	(Australia) Vic Vipers	7 – 0	2014-8-26
(Kuwait) Hamad Alawadhi	(Kuwait) Al Qadsia	(Lebanon) Bank of Beirut	10 – 7	2014-8-27
(Jordan) Samer Aldeen	(Kuwait) Al Qadsia	(Lebanon) Bank of Beirut	10 – 7	2014-8-27
(Brazil) Danilo Moura	(China) Shenzhen Nanling	(Japan) Nagoya Oceans	6 – 6	2014-8-27
(Australia) Miguel Barrigos	(Australia) Vic Vipers	(Uzbekistan) Lokomotiv Tashkent	3 – 7	2014-8-27
(Brazil) Rubinho	(China) Shenzhen Nanling	(Iran) Dabiri	5 – 5	2014-8-30
(Spain) Saul Olmo Campana	(Vietnam) Thái Sơn Nam	(China) Shenzhen Nanling	5 – 1	2015-7-31
(Kuwait) Abdulrahman Altawail	(Kuwait) Al Qadsia	(United Arab Emirates) Al-Khaleej	9 – 1	2015-8-1
(Iran) Vahid Shamsaei^{4}	(Iran) Tasisat Daryaei	(Kuwait) Al Qadsia	9 – 2	2015-8-2
(Iran) Mohammad Nasser Safari	(Iraq) Naft Al-Wasat	(Lebanon) Bank of Beirut	4 – 4	2015-8-4
(Iran) Majid Raeisi	(Iran) Tasisat Daryaei	(Iraq) Naft Al-Wasat	7 – 3	2015-8-5
(Iran) Hossein Tayyebi	(Iran) Tasisat Daryaei	(Lebanon) Al-Mayadeen	6 – 2	2016-7-17
(Kyrgyzstan) Maksadbek Alimov	(Kyrgyzstan) EREM	(Vietnam) Thái Sơn Nam	5 – 4	2017-7-20
(Iran) Ghodrat Bahadori^{5}	(Iraq) Naft Al-Wasat	(Tajikistan) Disi Invest	7 – 2	2017-7-21
(Thailand) Jirawat Sornwichian^{5}	(Thailand) Chonburi Bluewave	(Lebanon) Bank of Beirut	9 – 0	2017-7-21
(Vietnam) Lê Quốc Nam	(Vietnam) Thái Sơn Nam	(Australia) Vic Vipers	9 – 2	2017-7-22
(Iran) Ahmad Esmaeilpour	(Iran) Giti Pasand	(China) Shenzhen Nanling	7 – 0	2017-7-22
(Indonesia) Andri Kustiawan	(Indonesia) Vamos Mataram	(Tajikistan) Disi Invest	5 – 2	2017-7-25
(Thailand) Jirawat Sornwichian	(Thailand) Chonburi Bluewave	(Vietnam) Thái Sơn Nam	6 – 0	2017-7-28
(Thailand) Suphawut Thueanklang	(Thailand) Chonburi Bluewave	(Iran) Giti Pasand	3 – 2	2017-7-30
(Thailand) Kritsada Wongkaeo	(Thailand) Chonburi Bluewave	(Australia) Vic Vipers	9 – 2	2018-8-2
(Iran) Hossein Tayyebi	(Iran) Mes Sungun	(Tajikistan) Sipar Khujand	9 – 2	2018-8-2
(Iran) Mahdi Javid	(Lebanon) Bank of Beirut	(Uzbekistan) AGMK	4 – 1	2018-8-2
(United Arab Emirates) Mohamed Fadaaq^{4}	(United Arab Emirates) Al-Dhafrah	(South Korea) Jeonju MAG	9 – 2	2018-8-3
(Thailand) Suphawut Thueanklang	(Thailand) Chonburi Bluewave	(Kyrgyzstan) EREM	5 – 1	2018-8-4
(Iran) Hossein Tayyebi^{4}	(Iran) Mes Sungun	(Uzbekistan) AGMK	9 – 1	2018-8-4
(Iran) Mahdi Javid	(Lebanon) Bank of Beirut	(Tajikistan) Sipar Khujand	11 – 2	2018-8-4
(Thailand) Suphawut Thueanklang^{4}	(Thailand) Chonburi Bluewave	(Lebanon) Bank of Beirut	7 – 7	2018-8-8
(Iraq) Al-Saedi	Naft Al-Wasat Iraq	(Indonesia) Vamos Mataram	7 – 4	2018-8-8
(Iran) Mahdi Javid	(Lebanon) Bank of Beirut	Naft Al-Wasat Iraq	5 – 3	2018-8-8
(Colombia) Ángellott Caro^{4}	(Iraq) Naft Al-Wasat	(Qatar) Al-Rayyan	9 – 4	2019-8-7
(Iran) Ali Asghar Hassanzadeh	(China) Shenzhen Nanling Tielang	(Kyrgyzstan) Osh EREM	8 – 3	2019-8-7
(Uzbekistan) Ikhtiyor Ropiev	(Uzbekistan) AGMK	(Iraq) Naft Al-Wasat	5 – 3	2019-8-9
(Lebanon) Ahmad Kheir El Dine	(Lebanon) Bank of Beirut	(Tajikistan) Soro Company	7 – 2	2019-8-10
(Iran) Mohammad Nasser Safari	(Qatar) Al-Rayyan	(Uzbekistan) AGMK	5 – 7	2019-8-11
(Myanmar) Aung Zin Oo^{4}	(Myanmar) Victoria University College	(Tajikistan) Soro Company	5 – 6	2019-8-12
(Thailand) Muhammad Osamanmusa	(Thailand) Port FC	(Uzbekistan) AGMK	3 – 4	2019-8-14
(Iran) Mahdi Javid	(Iran) Mes Sungun	(Uzbekistan) AGMK	7 – 3	2019-8-15
(Japan) Kazuya Shimizu	(Vietnam) Thái Sơn Nam	(Uzbekistan) AGMK	6 – 4	2019-8-17

- ^{4} Player scored 4 goals
- ^{5} Player scored 5 goals
- ^{6} Player scored 6 goals

== Managers ==
Rank	Nation	Manager	Won	Runner-up	Years won	Years runner-up	Clubs won	Clubs runner-up
1	(Spain)	José María Pazos Méndez	1	1	2013	2014	(Thailand) Chonburi Blue Wave	(Thailand) Chonburi Blue Wave
1	(Iran)	Alireza Afzal	1	1	2012	2017	(Iran) Giti Pasand	(Iran) Giti Pasand
3	(Iran)	Hossein Afzali	1	0	2010		(Iran) Foolad Mahan	
3	(Portugal)	José Adil Amarante	1	0	2011		(Japan) Nagoya Oceans	
3	(Spain)	Victor Acosta Garcia	1	0	2014		(Japan) Nagoya Oceans	
3	(Iran)	Amir Shamsaei	1	0	2015		(Iran) Tasisat Daryaei	
3	(Portugal)	Pedro Costa	1	0	2016		(Japan) Nagoya Oceans	
3	(Thailand)	Rakphol SaiNetngam	1	0	2017		(Thailand) Chonburi Blue Wave	
3	(Iran)	Hamid Bigham	1	0	2018		(Iran) Mes Sungun	
3	(Spain)	Juan Francisco Fuentes Zamora	1	0	2019		(Japan) Nagoya Oceans	
11	(Iran)	Reza Lak Aliabadi	0	2		2011, 2013		(Iran) Shahid Mansouri, (Iran) Giti Pasand
12	(Brazil)	Fabiano Ribeiro	0	1		2010		(Qatar) Al Sadd
12	(Uzbekistan)	Alexander Petrov	0	1		2012		(Uzbekistan) Ardus Tashkent
12	(Brazil)	Fabio Cortez Torres	0	1		2015		(Kuwait) Al-Qadsia
12	(Iraq)	Haitham Abbas Bawei	0	1		2016		(Iraq) Naft Al-Wasat
12	(Spain)	Miguel Rodrigo	0	1		2018		(Vietnam) Thái Sơn Nam
12	(Iran)	Esmaeil Taghipour	0	1		2019		(Iran) Mes Sungun
