= 2013 AFC Futsal Club Championship qualification =

AFC Futsal Club Championship
- Season: 2013
- Champions: Zone 1 Al Sadd Zone 2 Chonburi Blue Wave
- 2013 AFC Futsal Club Championship: Chonburi Blue Wave; Shenzhen Nanling; Thai Son Nam; Al Sadd; Al Sadaka
- Matches: 22
- Goals: 171 (7.77 per match)

The 2013 AFC Futsal Club Championship qualification were held to determine 5 spots to the final tournament. The teams finishing first, second and third in the 2012 AFC Futsal Club Championship, receive automatic byes to the final round. It will between 11 and 24 April 2013.

== Format ==
Sixteen teams registered in qualifying action for 5 places in the finals. Reigning champions Iran, runners-up Uzbekistan, Japan have direct entry into the tournament proper. The remaining Thirteen team will play in the qualification rounds. The result of the draw for the groups was announced on 13 February 2013. Zone 1 teams will play a round-robin groupstage, with the top two teams qualifying to the semi-finals. The winner of both semi-finals will the progress to the final tournament as well. Zone 2 will play a round-robin groupstage, with the top two teams qualifying to the semi-finals. A total of three teams from Zone 2 qualifiers will qualify for the finals.

== Zones ==
=== West, South and Central Asian (Zone 1) ===
The matches will be played in Panasonic Sports Complex, Shah Alam, Malaysia from April 19 to 24, 2013.

==== Group A ====
Team	Pld	W	D	L	GF	GA	GD	Pts
(Lebanon) Al Sadaka	2	1	1	0	9	5	+4	4
(United Arab Emirates) Al Wasl	2	1	0	1	7	10	-3	3
(Iraq) Naft Al Wasat	2	0	1	1	7	8	-1	1

April 19
18:30

Al Sadaka (Lebanon)	3 - 3	(Iraq) Naft Al Wasat
H. Chaito 21', 36'; P. Rajić 28'	Report	F. Mohammed Abed 1'; K. Mohsin Mohammed 13'; M. Bachay Hamzah 24'

Panasonic Sports Complex, Shah Alam
Attendance: 100
Referee: Rey Ritaga (Philippines)

April 20
18:30

Al Wasl (United Arab Emirates)	5 - 4	(Iraq) Naft Al Wasat
R. Henmi 16'; J. Abdulkarim 23'; A. Mahmood 37'; A. Alexander 38', 39'	Report	H. Niazi 24'; M. Bachay Hamzah 26'; K. Mohsin Mohammed 33'; F. Tavakoli 40'

Panasonic Sports Complex, Shah Alam
Attendance: 120
Referee: Abdulrahman Abdulqader Abdulrahman Abdulla (Bahrain)

April 21
18:30

Al Sadaka (Lebanon)	6 - 2	(United Arab Emirates) Al Wasl
H. Chaito 9'; Y. Salman 10'; K. Kawsan 14'; R. El Kakhi 18'; J. Kouteny 18'; M. Georges 27'	Report	B. Ibrahim 28'; J. Abdulkarim 30'

Panasonic Sports Complex, Shah Alam
Attendance: 80
Referee: Liu Jianqiao (China)

==== Group B ====
Team	Pld	W	D	L	GF	GA	GD	Pts
(Qatar) Al Sadd	2	2	0	0	10	5	+5	6
(Kuwait) Al Salmiya	2	1	0	1	9	10	-1	3
(Kyrgyzstan) Dordoi	2	0	0	2	4	8	-4	0

April 19
15:30

Al Sadd (Qatar)	3 - 1	(Kyrgyzstan) Dordoi
A. Mollaali 16' (pen.); M. Ibrahim 28'; M. Ahmed Ismail 32'	Report	E. Kesha 39'

Panasonic Sports Complex, Shah Alam
Attendance: 100
Referee: Scott Bradley Kidson (Australia)

April 20
15:30

Al Salmiya (Kuwait)	5 - 3	(Kyrgyzstan) Dordoi
H. Muhammad 17', 35'; A. Alwadi 18'; N. Alqalaf 24'; S. Mauricio 34'	Report	Ch. China 3'; Sh. Jumaev 4', 36'

Panasonic Sports Complex, Shah Alam
Attendance: 80
Referee: Kim Jang-Kwan (South Korea)

April 21
15:30

Al Sadd (Qatar)	7 - 4	(Kuwait) Al Salmiya
P. Vieira 2'; A. Mohaseen 3', 4', 8'; M. Ibrahim 17'; F. Barreto 26', 38'	Report	N. Alqalaf 2'; S. Almekaimi 19'; H. Muhammad 26', 27'

Panasonic Sports Complex, Shah Alam
Attendance: 100
Referee: Truong Quoc Dung (Vietnam)

==== Semi-finals ====
April 23
15:30

Al Sadaka (Lebanon)	6 - 2	Al Salmiya (Kuwait)
M. Serhan 15', 29'; P. Rajić 16'; Y. Salman 35'; H. Chaito 39'; K. Zeid 40'	Report	S. Almekaimi 3'; S. Mauricio 4'

Panasonic Sports Complex, Shah Alam
Attendance: 100
Referee: Kim Jang-Kwan (South Korea)

April 23
19:00

Al Sadd (Qatar)	5 - 3	Al Wasl (United Arab Emirates)
P. Vieira 9'; A. Mohaseen 11', 26'; M. Ibrahim 22'; Kh. Ahmad 39'	Report	J. Abdulkarim 32'; S. Hazem 33'; O. Abdulraouf 36'

Panasonic Sports Complex, Shah Alam
Attendance: 50
Referee: Scott Kidson (Australia)

==== Final ====
April 24
18:30

Al Sadaka (Lebanon)	2 - 5	Al Sadd (Qatar)
K. Markovic 2'; H. Chaito 36'	Report	M. Ahmed Ismail 13'; M. Ibrahim 31', 39'; M. Georges 36' (o.g.); A. Mohaseen 40'

Panasonic Sports Complex, Shah Alam
Attendance: 70
Referee: Truong Quoc Dung (Vietnam)

port

=== ASEAN/East (Zone 2) ===
The matches will be played in Panasonic Sports Complex, Shah Alam, Malaysia from April 11 to 16, 2013.

==== Group A ====
Team	Pld	W	D	L	GF	GA	GD	Pts
(Thailand) Chonburi Blue Wave	3	3	0	0	21	8	+13	9
(China) Shenzhen Nanling	3	2	0	1	17	7	+10	6
(Chinese Taipei) Tainan City	3	1	0	2	10	13	-3	3
(Philippines) Pasargad	3	0	0	3	4	24	-20	0

April 11
12:30

Chonburi Blue Wave (Thailand)	7 - 5	(Chinese Taipei) Tainan City
W. Kritsada 2', 16'; T. Santanaprasit 11'; Ch. Apiwat 25', 26'; Xapa 30'; Ch. Kiatiyot 31'	Report	H. Cheng-Tsung 5', 38'; L. Chi-Chao 14'; Ch. Han 23'; Wu, Chun-Ching 33'

Panasonic Sports Complex, Shah Alam
Attendance: 67
Referee: Nurdin Bukuev (Kyrgyzstan)

April 11
18:30

Shenzhen Nanling (China)	10 - 2	(Philippines) Pasargad
Danilo 9', 11', 24'; Y. Lu 13'; L. Zeng 14', 24'; J. Huang 19'; V. Shamsaei 21', 32', 34'	Report	L. Zeng 14' (o.g.); S. Zalmoo 34'

Panasonic Sports Complex, Shah Alam
Attendance: 104
Referee: Mohamad Chami (Lebanon)

April 12
12:30

Tainan City (Chinese Taipei)	1 - 6	(China) Shenzhen Nanling
Ch. Han 30'	Report	Danilo 3', 33'; Y. Lu 11'; V. Shamsaei 20', 27'; L. Zeng 39'

Panasonic Sports Complex, Shah Alam
Attendance: 120
Referee: Helday Idang (Malaysia)

April 12
18:30

Pasargad (Philippines)	2 - 10	(Thailand) Chonburi Blue Wave
D. Abassi 32', 33'	Report	T. Santanaprasit 10', 19'; Tu. Suphawut 22'; W. Kritsada 23', 30'; Xapa 25'; Ch. Kiatiyot 26'; Ch. Apiwat 27'; L. Issarasuwipakorn 28'; U. Lassanakarn 40'

Panasonic Sports Complex, Shah Alam
Attendance: 105
Referee: Vahid Arzpeyma Mohanareh (Iran)

April 13
12:30

Chonburi Blue Wave (Thailand)	4 - 1	(China) Shenzhen Nanling
Tu. Suphawut 11'; W. Kritsada 16', 27'; T. Santanaprasit 32'	Report	Y. Lu 23'

Panasonic Sports Complex, Shah Alam
Attendance: 255
Referee: Nurdin Bukuev (Kyrgyzstan)

April 13
18:30

Pasargad (Philippines)	0 - 4	(Chinese Taipei) Tainan City
	Report	L. Chi-Chao 9', 37'; Ch. Han 22'; Wu, Chun-Ching 30'

Panasonic Sports Complex, Shah Alam
Attendance: 45
Referee: Mamhoud Reza Nasirloo (Iran)

==== Group B ====
Team	Pld	W	D	L	GF	GA	GD	Pts
(Vietnam) Thai Son Nam	2	1	1	0	8	4	+4	4
(Australia) Dural Warriors	2	1	0	1	6	8	-2	3
(Indonesia) Pelindo	2	0	1	1	4	6	-2	1

April 11
15:30

Thai Son Nam (Vietnam)	6–2	(Australia) Dural Warriors
Inaba 14', 31'; Phùng Trọng Luân 18', 39'; Phạm Thành Đạt 38', 38'	Report	Giovenali 15'; Bradley 37'

Panasonic Sports Complex, Shah Alam
Attendance: 85
Referee: Mamhoudreza Nasirloo (Iran)

April 12
15:30

Pelindo (Indonesia)	2 - 4	(Australia) Dural Warriors
A. Zulfikar 7'; S. Ohorella 40'	Report	B. Rosier 23'; N. Niski 26'; Z. Caruana 28'; G. Giovenali 30' (pen.)

Panasonic Sports Complex, Shah Alam
Attendance: 47
Referee: Husein Khalaileh (Jordan)

April 13
15:30

Thai Son Nam (Vietnam)	2–2	(Indonesia) Pelindo
Nguyễn Bảo Quân 35'; Inaba 40'	Report	Ohorella 8'; Zulfikar 37'

Panasonic Sports Complex, Shah Alam
Attendance: 70
Referee: Hiroyuki Kobayashi (Japan)

==== Semi-finals ====
April 15
15:30

Chonburi Blue Wave (Thailand)	8 - 1	(Australia) Dural Warriors
Ch. Kiatiyot 3', 37'; W. Kritsada 7', 14'; Ch. Apiwat 12'; Tu. Suphawut 22', 28', 30'	Report	J. Basger 32'

Panasonic Sports Complex, Shah Alam
Attendance: 65
Referee: Nurdin Bukuev (Kyrgyzstan)

April 15
19:00

Thai Son Nam (Vietnam)	2–4 (a.e.t.)	(China) Shenzhen Nanling
Lê Quốc Nam 31'; Phùng Trọng Luân 36'	Report	Kuang Xuanpu 29', 38'; Shamsaei 40'; Danilo 50'

Panasonic Sports Complex, Shah Alam
Attendance: 120
Referee: Mohamad Chami (Lebanon)

==== 3rd/4th Placing ====
April 16
15:15

Dural Warriors (Australia)	3–6	(Vietnam) Thai Son Nam
Seeto 1'; Basger 11', 38'	Report	Lưu Quỳnh Toàn 8', 36'; Riquer 21', 39'; Nguyễn Bảo Quân 26'; Phùng Trọng Luân 28'

Panasonic Sports Complex, Shah Alam
Attendance: 40
Referee: Vahid Arzpeyma Mohanareh (Iran)

==== Final ====
April 16
18:30

Chonburi Blue Wave (Thailand)	7 - 1	(China) Shenzhen Nanling
L. Issarasuwipakorn 1'; T. Suphawut 14', 20', 36'; M. Nattawut 27'; U. Lassanakarn 30'; CH. Apiwat 40'	Report	Y. Lu 28'

Panasonic Sports Complex, Shah Alam
Attendance: 180
Referee: Mohamad Chami (Lebanon)

== Goal scorers ==
=== Zone 1 ===
6 goals

- (Qatar) Amro Mohaseen (Al Sadd)

5 goals

- (Lebanon) Hassan Chaito (Al Sadaka)
- (Qatar) Mohamed Ibrahim Rashid (Al Sadd)

4 goals

- (Kuwait) Hamzah Muhammad (Al Salmiya)

3 goals

- (United Arab Emirates) Jamil Abdulkarim (Al Wasl)

2 goals

- (Iraq) Mustafa Bachay Hamzah (Naft Al Wasat)
- (Iraq) Karrar Mohsin Mohammed (Naft Al Wasat)
- (Serbia) Predrag Rajić (Al Sadaka)
- (Brazil) Patrick Vieira Luz (Al Sadd)
- (Lebanon) Yasser Salman (Al Sadaka)
- (Lebanon) Moustafa Serhan (Al Sadaka)
- (United Arab Emirates) Mohamed Ismail Ahmed Ismail (Al Sadd)
- (Qatar) Flavio Barreto Arantes (Al Sadd)
- (Brazil) Sidnei Mauricio (Al Salmiya)
- (Kuwait) Naser Alqalaf (Al Salmiya)
- (Kuwait) Salem Almekaimi (Al Salmiya)
- (Colombia) Angellott Alexander (Al Wasl)

1 goal

- (Qatar) Ahmad Mollaali (Al Sadd)
- (United Arab Emirates) Ahmed Mahmood (Al Wasl)
- (Japan) Rafael Henmi (Al Wasl)
- (Lebanon) Rabie El Kakhi (Al Sadaka)
- (Lebanon) Jean Kouteny (Al Sadaka)
- (Qatar) Khalil Ahmad (Al Sadd)
- (Serbia) Kosta Markovic (Al Sadaka)
- (Kuwait) Abdulrahman Alwadi (Al Salmiya)
- (Iran) Hossein Niazi (Naft Al Wasat)
- (Iran) Farhad Tavakoli (Naft Al Wasat)
- (Lebanon) Kassem Kawsan (Al Sadaka)
- (Iraq) Marwan Georges (Al Sadaka)
- (United Arab Emirates) Salem Hazem (Al Wasl)
- (Tajikistan) Sherzod Jumaev (Dordoi)
- (Kyrgyzstan) Erkin Kesha (Dordoi)
- (Iraq) Firas Mohammed Abed (Naft Al Wasat)
- (Kyrgyzstan) Chingiz China (Dordoi)
- (Lebanon) Karim Zeid (Al Sadaka)
- (United Arab Emirates) Omar Abdulraouf (Al Wasl)
- (United Arab Emirates) Bader Ibrahim (Al Wasl)

Own goals

- (Iraq) Marwan Georges (Al Sadaka)

=== Zone 2 ===
8 goals

- (Thailand) Kritsada Wongkaeo (Chonburi Blue Wave)
- (Thailand) Suphawut Thueanklang (Chonburi Blue Wave)

6 goals

- (Iran) Vahid Shamsaei (Shenzhen Nanling)
- (Brazil) Danilo (Shenzhen Nanling)

5 goals

- (Thailand) Apiwat Chaemcharoen (Chonburi Blue Wave)

4 goals

- (Thailand) Tanakorn Santanaprasit (Chonburi Blue Wave)
- (Thailand) Kiatiyot Chalarmkhet (Chonburi Blue Wave)
- (Vietnam) Phung Trong Luan (Thái Sơn Nam)
- (China) Lu Yue (Shenzhen Nanling)

3 goals

- (Chinese Taipei) Chang Han (Tainan City)
- (Chinese Taipei) Liu Chi-Chao (Tainan City)
- (China) Zeng Liang (Shenzhen Nanling)
- (Australia) Jarrod Basger (Dural Warriors)
- (Japan) Kotaro Inaba (Thái Sơn Nam)

2 goals

- (Vietnam) Pham Thanh Dat (Thái Sơn Nam)
- (Vietnam) Nguyen Bao Quan (Thái Sơn Nam)
- (Vietnam) Luu Quynh Toan (Thái Sơn Nam)
- (Iran) Davod Abassi (Pasargad)
- (Australia) Gregory Giovenali (Dural Warriors)
- (Thailand) Lertchai Issarasuwipakorn (Chonburi Blue Wave)
- (Thailand) Ulit Lassanakarn (Chonburi Blue Wave)
- (Chinese Taipei) Wu, Chun-Ching (Tainan City)
- (Chinese Taipei) Huang Cheng-Tsung (Tainan City)
- (Spain) Alberto Riquer Anton (Thái Sơn Nam)
- (China) Kuang Xuanpu (Shenzhen Nanling)
- (Brazil) Xapa (Chonburi Blue Wave)
- (Indonesia) Ahmad Zulfikar (Pelindo)

1 goal

- (Australia) Blake Rosier (Dural Warriors)
- (Australia) Zach Caruana (Dural Warriors)
- (Australia) Adam Bradley (Dural Warriors)
- (Australia) Nathan Niski (Dural Warriors)
- (Australia) Tobias Seeto (Dural Warriors)
- (Indonesia) Hairul Saleh Ohorella (Pelindo)
- (Indonesia) Hairul Saleh Ohorella (Pelindo)
- (Thailand) Nattawut Madyalan (Chonburi Blue Wave)
- (Vietnam) Le Quoc Nam (Thái Sơn Nam)
- (Iran) Soroush Zalmoo (Pasargad)
- (China) Huang Jiafu (Shenzhen Nanling)

Own goals

(China) Zeng Liang (Shenzhen Nanling), Scored for Pasargad (1)

== Qualifiers ==
The following eight teams will play the final tournament.

2012 tournament

- (Iran) Giti Pasand Isfahan (Iranian Futsal Super League (1st))
- (Uzbekistan Futsal League (2nd))
- (Japan) Nagoya Oceans (F. League (3rd)) and Host nation

East and Southeast

- (Thailand) Chonburi Blue Wave (1st)
- (China) Shenzhen Nanling (2nd)
- (Vietnam) Thai Son Nam (3rd)

South and Central Asian

- (Qatar) Al Sadd (1st)
- (Lebanon) Al Sadaka (2nd)

== See also ==
- 2013 AFC Futsal Club Championship
