= 2012 AFC Futsal Club Championship qualification =

AFC Futsal Club Championship
- Season: 2012
- Champions: Zone 1 Ardus Zone 2 GH Bank RBAC
- 2012 AFC Futsal Club Championship: Al Rayyan; Ardus; GH Bank RBAC; Thai Son Nam
- Matches: 19
- Goals: 140 (7.37 per match)
- Top goalscorer: 9 Goals; Suphawut Thueanklang
- Highest scoring: GH Bank RBAC 12 - 2 ACE

The 2012 AFC Futsal Club Championship qualification was held in late 2012 to determine 4 spots to the final tournament in Kuwait City. The teams finishing first, second and third in the 2011 AFC Futsal Club Championship, and the host Champion for the 2012 competition, received automatic byes to Finals.

== Format ==
Fifteen teams registered in qualifying action for 4 places in the finals. Reigning champions Japan, runners-up Iran, Lebanon and 2012 edition hosts Kuwait received direct entry into the tournament proper. The remaining eleven teams played in the qualification rounds. The result of the draw for the groups was announced on 26 January 2012. Zone 1 teams played a round robin with the top two qualifying to the final tournament. Zone 2 played a round-robin groupstage, with the top two teams qualifying to the semi-finals. The winner of both semi-finals progressed to the final tournament as well.

== Zones ==
=== West, South and Central Asian (Zone 1) ===
The matches were played in Tashkent, Uzbekistan from March 19 and 24, 2012.

| Team | Pld | W | D | L | GF | GA | GD | Pts |
|---|---|---|---|---|---|---|---|---|
| (Uzbekistan) Ardus Tashkent | 4 | 4 | 0 | 0 | 24 | 6 | +18 | 12 |
| (Qatar) Al Rayyan | 4 | 2 | 1 | 1 | 17 | 18 | -1 | 7 |
| (United Arab Emirates) Al Wasl | 4 | 2 | 0 | 2 | 18 | 12 | +6 | 6 |
| (Kyrgyzstan) Nalogovik Bishkek | 4 | 1 | 1 | 2 | 14 | 15 | -1 | 4 |
| (Iraq) Al Karkh | 4 | 0 | 0 | 4 | 11 | 29 | -18 | 0 |

March 19
16:00

| Ardus Tashkent (Uzbekistan) | 2 - 1 | (United Arab Emirates) Al Wasl |
|---|---|---|
| A. Yunusov 5'; D. Rakhmatov 11' | Report | A. Hezam 23' |

Uzbekistan Sports Complex, Tashkent
Attendance: 300
Referee: Scott Bradley Kidson (Australia)

March 19
19:00

| Al Rayyan (Qatar) | 3 - 3 | (Kyrgyzstan) Nalogovik Bishkek |
|---|---|---|
| Saad Bilal 21'; H. Shota 21'; Sultan Bilal 38' | Report | R. Isaev 32'; A. Mendibaev 33'; U. Rysulov 34' |

Uzbekistan Sports Complex, Tashkent
Attendance: 150
Referee: Kim Jang-Kwan (South Korea)

March 20
16:00

| Nalogovik Bishkek (Kyrgyzstan) | 2 - 4 | (Uzbekistan) Ardus Tashkent |
|---|---|---|
| R. Isaev 8'; A. Kyrmanchy 18' | Report | D. Rakhmatov 24'; D. Irsaliev 30'; J. Sharipov 31'; K. Sviridov 33' |

Uzbekistan Sports Complex, Tashkent
Attendance: 400
Referee: Chiristopher Daniel Colley (Australia)

March 20
19:00

| Al Wasl (United Arab Emirates) | 7 - 3 | (Iraq) Al Karkh |
|---|---|---|
| S. Jamil 11', 12'; A. Jamil 17', 21', 29'; A. Idris 22'; Abdulraouf Omar 25' | Report | I. Ghadhban 10', 23'; A. Adnan 32' |

Uzbekistan Sports Complex, Tashkent
Attendance: 100
Referee: Kim Jang-Kwan (South Korea)

March 21
16:00

| Al Karkh (Iraq) | 2 - 7 | (Qatar) Al Rayyan |
|---|---|---|
| I. Ghadhban 12'; M. Abdullah 39' (pen.) | Report | Carlos Corvo 13', 16', 18', 20', 31'; M. Mohammed 29'; H. Shota 38' |

Uzbekistan Sports Complex, Tashkent
Attendance: 100
Referee: Zhang Youze (China)

March 21
19:00

| Al Wasl (United Arab Emirates) | 4 - 3 | (Kyrgyzstan) Nalogovik Bishkek |
|---|---|---|
| S. Jamil 16'; J. Soltani 18', 33'; A. Hezam 39' | Report | Z. Kasimov 29'; A. Pestryakov 31', 39' |

Uzbekistan Sports Complex, Tashkent
Attendance: 150
Referee: Mohamad Chami (Lebanon)

March 23
16:00

| Al Rayyan (Qatar) | 6 - 4 | (United Arab Emirates) Al Wasl |
|---|---|---|
| Saad Bilal 5', 35'; Vadillo Sanchez 9', 38'; A. Raja 12'; H. Shota 15' | Report | J. Soltani 6', 19'; A. Hezam 40'; S. Jamil 40' |

Uzbekistan Sports Complex, Tashkent
Attendance: 250
Referee: Scott Bradley Kidson (Australia)

March 23
19:00

| Al Karkh (Iraq) | 2 - 9 | (Uzbekistan) Ardus Tashkent |
|---|---|---|
| I. Ghadhban 33'; Zaid NajiA 39' | Report | J. Sharipov 4', 31'; N. Elibaev 5'; D. Rakhmatov 12', 39'; S. Buriev 30'; D. Irsaliev 31', 39', 39' |

Uzbekistan Sports Complex, Tashkent
Attendance: 300
Referee: Rey Ritaga (Philippines)

March 24
16:00

| Nalogovik Bishkek (Kyrgyzstan) | 6 - 4 | (Iraq) Al Karkh |
|---|---|---|
| R. Isaev 12'; A. Mendibaev 14', 26'; Zaid NajiA 27' (o.g.); A. Pestryakov 38'; E. Tabaldiev 40' | report | Zaid NajiA 23'; H. Jabbar 24'; Z. Salim 33'; I. Ghadhban 35' |

Uzbekistan Sports Complex, Tashkent
Attendance: 100
Referee: Samsudin Bin Ibrahim (Malaysia)

March 24
19:00

| Ardus Tashkent (Uzbekistan) | 9 - 1 | (Qatar) Al Rayyan |
|---|---|---|
| J. Sharipov 9', 13', 38'; F. Abdumavlyanov 10'; D. Irsaliev 15', 20', 32'; K. Sviridov 37'; D. Rakhmatov 40' | Report | S. Aljarhab 17' |

Uzbekistan Sports Complex, Tashkent
Attendance: 700
Referee: Chiristopher Daniel Colley (Australia)

=== ASEAN/East (Zone 2) ===
The matches were played in Ho Chi Minh City, Vietnam from March 19 and 24, 2012.

==== Group A ====
| Team | Pld | W | D | L | GF | GA | GD | Pts |
|---|---|---|---|---|---|---|---|---|
| (Vietnam) Thai Son Nam | 2 | 2 | 0 | 0 | 4 | 1 | +3 | 6 |
| (China) Guangzhou Baiyunshan | 2 | 1 | 0 | 1 | 5 | 6 | -1 | 3 |
| (Australia) Maccabi Hakoah | 2 | 0 | 0 | 2 | 3 | 5 | -2 | 0 |

March 19
19:00

| Thai Son Nam (Vietnam) | 1 - 0 | (Australia) Maccabi Hakoah |
|---|---|---|
| Luu Quynh Toan 37' | Report |

Phu Tho Stadium, Ho Chi Minh City
Attendance: 900
Referee: Mamhoud Reza Nasirloo (Iran)

March 20
19:00

| Guangzhou Baiyunshan (China) | 4 - 3 | (Australia) Maccabi Hakoah |
|---|---|---|
| Junior 3'; He Yihui 10', 18'; Fan Zhirui 25' | Report | F. Neale 13'; J. Basger 24'; Adriano Rodrigo 34' |

Phu Tho Stadium, Ho Chi Minh City
Attendance: 300
Referee: Mohammad Al-Haddad (Kuwait)

March 21
19:00

| Thai Son Nam (Vietnam) | 3 - 1 | (China) Guangzhou Baiyunshan |
|---|---|---|
| Phung Trong Luan 15'; Luu Quynh Toan 20'; Nguyen Bao Quan 33' | Report | Junior 3' |

Phu Tho Stadium, Ho Chi Minh City
Attendance: 1200
Referee: Vahid Arzpeyma Mohanareh (Iran)

==== Group B ====
| Team | Pld | W | D | L | GF | GA | GD | Pts |
|---|---|---|---|---|---|---|---|---|
| (Thailand) GH Bank RBAC | 2 | 2 | 0 | 0 | 19 | 2 | +17 | 6 |
| (Indonesia) Pelindo | 2 | 1 | 0 | 1 | 8 | 9 | -1 | 3 |
| (Myanmar) ACE | 2 | 0 | 0 | 2 | 4 | 20 | -16 | 0 |

March 19
16:00

| GH Bank RBAC (Thailand) | 12 - 2 | (Myanmar) ACE |
|---|---|---|
| K. Wongkaeo 3', 29', 38'; S. Thueanklang 10', 30', 37', 39'; Ch. Keattiyot 12'; Renato 34', 35'; Han Naing Soe 38' (o.g.); L. Issarasuwipakorn 39' | Report | T. Ko Ko 22'; A. Thu 26' |

Phu Tho Stadium, Ho Chi Minh City
Attendance: 100
Referee: Shukhrat Pulatov (Uzbekistan)

March 20
16:00

| Pelindo (Indonesia) | 8 - 2 | (Myanmar) ACE |
|---|---|---|
| A. Zulfikar 10', 30'; S. Matulessy 15'; S. Ohorella 19'; I. Purnomo 24'; G. Wardhana 29'; A. Taufiqurrahman 34'; C. Silitonga 38' | Report | T. Ko Ko 15'; A. Aung 39' |

Phu Tho Stadium, Ho Chi Minh City
Attendance: 100
Referee: Abdulrahman Abdulqader Abdulrahman Abdulla (Bahrain)

March 21
16:00

| GH Bank RBAC (Thailand) | 7 - 0 | (Indonesia) Pelindo |
|---|---|---|
| C. Silitonga 2' (o.g.); S. Thueanklang 12', 13', 32' (pen.); P. Kittipong 21'; Renato 26', 38' | Report |

Phu Tho Stadium, Ho Chi Minh City
Attendance: 100
Referee: Husein Khalaileh (Jordan)

==== Semi-finals ====
March 23
16:00

| Thai Son Nam (Vietnam) | 2 - 1 (a.e.t.) | (Indonesia) Pelindo |
|---|---|---|
| Tran Van Vu 13'; Pham Thana Tuan 42' | Report | A. Taufiqurrahman 18' |

Phu Tho Stadium, Ho Chi Minh City
Attendance: 1250
Referee: Nurdin Bukuev (Kyrgyzstan)

March 23
19:00

| GH Bank RBAC (Thailand) | 8 - 1 | (China) Guangzhou Baiyunshan |
|---|---|---|
| Ch. Keattiyot 4', 31'; L. Issarasuwipakorn 11'; S. Thueanklang 17', 29'; S. Khumthinkaew 33', 35'; P. Saisorn 39' | Report | Guan Zhichao 30' |

Phu Tho Stadium, Ho Chi Minh City
Attendance: 400
Referee: Alireza Sohrabi Balsin (Iran)

==== Final ====
March 24
16:00

| Thai Son Nam (Vietnam) | 0 - 1 | (Thailand) GH Bank RBAC |
|---|---|---|
| | Report | K. Wongkaeo 3' |

Phu Tho Stadium, Ho Chi Minh City
Attendance: 1800
Referee: Mohammad Al-Haddad (Kuwait)

== Top Goalscorers ==
=== Top Goalscorers, Zone 1 ===
7 Goals

- (Uzbekistan) Dilshod Irsaliev (Ardus Tashkent)

=== Top Goalscorers, Zone 2 ===
==== Group A ====
2 Goals

- (Vietnam) Luu Quynh Toan (Thai Son Nam)
- (Brazil) Junior (Guangzhou Baiyunshan)

==== Group B ====
9 Goals

- (Thailand) Suphawut Thueanklang (GH Bank RBAC)

== Qualifiers ==
The following eight teams played the final tournament.

Host nation

- Yarmouk (Kuwait Futsal Winner)

2011 tournament

- (Japan) Nagoya Oceans (F. League (1st))
- (Iran) Giti Pasand Isfahan (Iranian Futsal Super League (2nd))
- (Lebanon) All Sports (Lebanese Premiere League (3rd))

East and Southeast

- (Thailand) GH Bank RBAC (1st)
- (Vietnam) Thai Son Nam (2nd)

South and Central Asian

- (Uzbekistan) Ardus Tashkent (1st)
- (Qatar) Al Rayyan (2nd)
