= 2014 AFC Futsal Club Championship =

Tournament details
- Host country: China
- City: Chengdu
- Dates: Aug 25–30
- Teams: 8
- Venue: 2 (in 1 host city)

Final positions
- Champions: (Japan) Nagoya Oceans (2nd title)
- Runners-up: (Thailand) Chonburi Blue Wave
- Third place: (Iran) Dabiri Tabriz
- Fourth place: (China) Shenzhen Nanling

Tournament statistics
- Matches played: 16
- Goals scored: 127 (7.94 per match)
- Attendance: 4,075 (255 per match)
- Top scorer: (Japan) Kaoru Morioka (5 goals)
- Best player: (Japan) Kaoru Morioka

The 2014 AFC Futsal Club Championship was the 5th AFC Futsal Club Championship. It was held in Chengdu, China 25–30 August 2014.

== Qualification ==
Locations of clubs in 2014 AFC Futsal Club Championship

Apart from hosts China and defending champions Thailand, teams from Iran, Japan, Uzbekistan, Kuwait, Australia and Lebanon competed in this championship.

Team	Qualified as
(Iran) Dabiri Tabriz	Iranian Super League 2013–14 Champions
(Japan) Nagoya Oceans	F. League 2013–14 Champions
(Uzbekistan) Lokomotiv Tashkent	2014 Uzbekistan Futsal League Champions
(Thailand) Chonburi Blue Wave	2013-14 Thailand Futsal League Champions
(China) Shenzhen Nanling	2014 Chinese Futsal League Champions / Host
(Kuwait) Al Qadsia	2013-14 Kuwait Futsal League Champions
(Australia) Vic Vipers	2013 F-League Champions
(Lebanon) Bank of Beirut SC	2013-14 Lebanon Futsal League Champions

== Venues ==
Chengdu
Shuangliu Sports Centre	UEST Arena
Capacity: 3,400	Capacity:

== Group stage ==
=== Group A ===
Team	Pld	W	D	L	GF	GA	GD	Pts
(Japan) Nagoya Oceans	3	2	1	0	15	7	+8	7
(China) Shenzhen Nanling	3	2	1	0	15	8	+7	7
(Uzbekistan) Lokomotiv Tashkent	3	1	0	2	10	12	−2	3
(Australia) Vic Vipers	3	0	0	3	3	16	−13	0

August 25
17:00 +08:00 CST

Nagoya Oceans (Japan)	3 – 1	(Uzbekistan) Lokomotiv Tashkent
H. Shirakata 8'; W. Tomoaki 21'; K. Sviridov 30' (o.g.)	Report	F. Abdumavlyanov 38'

Shuangliu Sports Centre, Chengdu
Attendance: 300
Referee: Ali Reza Sohrabi Balsini (Iran)

August 25
20:00 +08:00 CST

Shenzhen Nanling (China)	3 – 0	(Australia) Vic Vipers
Z. Liang 8', 27'; C. Lin 23'	Report

Shuangliu Sports Centre, Chengdu
Attendance: 750
Referee: Mohamad Chami (Lebanon)

August 26
17:00 +08:00 CST

Vic Vipers (Australia)	0 – 6	(Japan) Nagoya Oceans
	Report	Y. Tomoki 3'; Ximbinha 9', 9', 15'; K. Morioka 12'; Y. Kiyato 27'

Shuangliu Sports Centre, Chengdu
Attendance: 100
Referee: Nurdin Bukuev (Kyrgyzstan)

August 26
20:00 +08:00 CST

Lokomotiv Tashkent (Uzbekistan)	2 – 6	(China) Shenzhen Nanling
O. Khalmukhamedov 20'; A. Yunusov 30'	Report	C. Lin 6'; L. Shiming 8', 13'; Rubinho 10', 38'; Z. Liang 14'

Shuangliu Sports Centre, Chengdu
Attendance: 300
Referee: Khamis Hasan Alshamsi (United Arab Emirates)

August 27
19:00 +08:00 CST

Shenzhen Nanling (China)	6 – 6	(Japan) Nagoya Oceans
D. Moura 10', 12', 17'; He Yihui 19'; D. Tao 25'; K. Morioka 33' (o.g.)	Report	Ximbinha 9', 19'; W. Kitahara 12'; W. Tomoaki 24'; Sh. Hidekazu 26'; K. Morioka 29'

Shuangliu Sports Centre, Chengdu
Attendance: 500
Referee: Hasan Mohammed Mousa Al-Gbur (Iraq)

August 27
19:00 +08:00 CST

Lokomotiv Tashkent (Uzbekistan)	7 – 3	(Australia) Vic Vipers
F. Abdumavlyanov 3', 34'; F. Moraes 8' (o.g.); V. Borisov 23', 35'; F. Azizov 27'; O. Khalmukhamedov 20'	Report	M. Barrigos 1', 19', 39'

UEST Arena, Chengdu
Attendance: 100
Referee: Ali Reza Sohrabi Balsini (Iran)

=== Group B ===
Team	Pld	W	D	L	GF	GA	GD	Pts
(Thailand) Chonburi Blue Wave	3	2	1	0	11	5	+6	7
(Iran) Dabiri Tabriz	3	2	0	1	13	6	+7	6
(Kuwait) Al Qadsia	3	1	1	1	16	18	−2	4
(Lebanon) Bank of Beirut	3	0	0	3	8	19	−11	0

August 25
12:00 +08:00 CST

Dabiri Tabriz (Iran)	5 – 1	(Lebanon) Bank of Beirut
J. Asghari Moghaddam 16'; V. Shafiei 24'; F. Namazi 35'; F. Fakhimzadeh 38'; N. Momen 39'	Report	A. Tneich 36'

Shuangliu Sports Centre, Chengdu
Attendance: 150
Referee: Chris Colley (Australia)

August 25
14:30 +08:00 CST

Chonburi Blue Wave (Thailand)	4 – 4	(Kuwait) Al Qadsia
Xapa 22'; H. Alawadhi 24' (o.g.); J. Sornwichian 28'; M. Al Nakkas 40' (o.g.)	Report	R. de Souza 12'; A. Al Wadi 30'; S. Al Mekaimi 36'; M. Al Nakkas 39'

Shuangliu Sports Centre, Chengdu
Attendance: 150
Referee: Hiroyuki Kobayashi (Japan)

August 26
12:00 +08:00 CST

Al Qadsia (Kuwait)	2 – 7	(Iran) Dabiri Tabriz
A. Altawail 5'; H. Alawadhi 30'	Report	M. Ezzati 11'; N. Momen 20'; B. Akbari 26'; F. Namazi 28'; B. Jafari 32'; J. Asghari Moghaddam 33'; V. Shafiei 35'

Shuangliu Sports Centre, Chengdu
Attendance: 75
Referee: Truong Quoc Dung (Vietnam)

August 26
14:30 +08:00 CST

Bank of Beirut (Lebanon)	0 – 4	(Thailand) Chonburi Blue Wave
	Report	S. Thueanklang 9', 35'; A. Chaemcharoen 28'; N. Madyalan 35'

Shuangliu Sports Centre, Chengdu
Attendance: 150
Referee: Liu Jianqiao (China)

August 27
16:00 +08:00 CST

Chonburi Blue Wave (Thailand)	3 – 1	(Iran) Dabiri Tabriz
S. Thueanklang 17'; J. Sornwichian 31'; F. Namazi 40' (o.g.)	Report	F. Namazi 36'

Shuangliu Sports Centre, Chengdu
Attendance: 100
Referee: Ryan Shepheard (Australia)

August 27
16:00 +08:00 CST

Bank of Beirut (Lebanon)	7 – 10	(Kuwait) Al Qadsia
M. Iskandarani 2'; A. El Dine 4', 33'; R. Ronquetti 29', 40'; Y. Salman 38'; A. El Homsi 40'	Report	H. Alawadhi 5', 32', 39'; R. De Souza 9', 24'; A. Altawail 11'; S. Al Mekaimi 26'; S. Aldeen 36', 38', 39'

UEST Arena, Chengdu
Attendance: 150
Referee: Yasukazu Nobumoto (Japan)

== Knockout stage ==
Semi-finals
August 29 – Chengdu
(Japan) Nagoya Oceans	6
(Iran) Dabiri Tabriz	2
August 29 – Chengdu
(Thailand) Chonburi Blue Wave	6
(China) Shenzhen Nanling	3

Final
August 30 – Chengdu
(Japan) Nagoya Oceans (a.e.t.)	5
(Thailand) Chonburi Blue Wave	4
Third place
August 30 – Chengdu
(Iran) Dabiri Tabriz (pen.)	5 (7)
(China) Shenzhen Nanling	5 (6)

=== Semi-finals ===
August 29
16:00 +08:00 CST

Nagoya Oceans (Japan)	6 – 2	(Iran) Dabiri Tabriz
W. Tomoaki 3'; Y. Tomoki 6'; W. Kitahara 28', 32'; Sh. Ryuma 39'; K. Morioka 39'	Report	M. Kouhestani 7'; F. Fakhimzadeh 8'

Shuangliu Sports Centre, Chengdu
Attendance: 150
Referee: Nurdin Bukuev (Kyrgyzstan)

August 29
19:00 +08:00 CST

Chonburi Blue Wave (Thailand)	6 – 3	(China) Shenzhen Nanling
Xapa 6'; J. Sornwichian 7', 24'; K. Chalarmkhet 16'; T. Santanaprasit 16'; S. Thueanklang 23'	Report	He Yihui 10', 40'; D. Tao 20'

Shuangliu Sports Centre, Chengdu
Attendance: 500
Referee: Chris Colley (Australia)

=== Third place play-off ===
August 30
16:00

Dabiri Tabriz (Iran)	5 – 5	(China) Shenzhen Nanling
B. Akbari 2'; F. Namazi 8', 25'; M. Ghasemi 14'; F. Fakhimzadeh 27'	Report	Rubinho 5', 13', 25'; Bruno 6'; Z. Liang 36'
Penalties
Vahid Shafiei (penalty missed); Mohammad Ghasemi (penalty scored); Farhad Fakhimzadeh (penalty scored); Javad Asghari Moghaddam (penalty scored); Farid Namazi (penalty scored); Nasrollah Momen (penalty scored); Morteza Ezzati (penalty scored); Mohammad Kouhestani (penalty scored)	7 – 6	(penalty scored) Rubinho; (penalty scored) Bruno; (penalty scored) Cong Lin; (penalty scored) Lu Yue; (penalty missed) Kuang Xuanpu; (penalty scored) He Yihui; (penalty scored) Deng Tao; (penalty missed) Zeng Liang

Shuangliu Sports Centre, Chengdu
Attendance: 300
Referee: Yasukazu Nobumoto (Japan)

=== Final ===
August 30
19:00

Nagoya Oceans (Japan)	5 – 4 (a.e.t.)	(Thailand) Chonburi Blue Wave
W. Kitahara 13', 49'; Sh. Hidekazu 22'; K. Morioka 27', 34'	Report	J. Sornwichian 9'; Xapa 13'; S. Jaipech 32', 40'

Shuangliu Sports Centre, Chengdu
Attendance: 300
Referee: Mahamed Chami (Lebanon)

== Awards ==
AFC Futsal Club Championship
2014 Champions

Nagoya Oceans
Second Title

- Most Valuable Player
  - (Japan) Kaoru Morioka
- Top Scorer
  - (Japan) Kaoru Morioka
- Fair-Play Award
  - (Japan) Nagoya Oceans
- All-Star Team
  - (Japan) Ryuma Shinoda (Nagoya Oceans) (GK)
  - (Japan) Kaoru Morioka (Nagoya Oceans)
  - (Iran) Vahid Shafiei (Dabiri Tabriz)
  - (Thailand) Suphawut Thueanklang (Chonburi Blue Wave)
  - (Thailand) Kritsada Wongkaeo (Chonburi Blue Wave)
- Reserve All-Star Team
  - (Iran) Esmail Abbasian (Chonburi Blue Wave) (GK)
  - (Iran) Farid Namazi (Dabiri Tabriz)
  - (Japan) Tomoki Yoshikawa (Nagoya Oceans)
  - (Brazil) Danilo Moura (Shenzhen Nanling Tielang)
  - (Iran) Behrouz Jafari (Dabiri Tabriz)
  - Coach: (Spain) Victor Acosta Garcia (Nagoya Oceans)

== Top scorers ==
Rank	Player	Club	Goals
1	(Japan) Kaoru Morioka	(Japan) Nagoya Oceans	5
1	(Iran) Farid Namazi	(Iran) Dabiri Tabriz	5
1	(Thailand) Jirawat Sornwichian	(Thailand) Chonburi Blue Wave	5
1	(Japan) Wataru Kitahara	(Japan) Nagoya Oceans	5
1	(Brazil) Rubens Roberto Salvador Claro	(China) Shenzhen Nanling	5
1	(Brazil) Ximbinha	(Japan) Nagoya Oceans	5
7	(Kuwait) Hamad Alawadhi	(Kuwait) Al Qadsia	4
7	(Thailand) Suphawut Thueanklang	(Thailand) Chonburi Blue Wave	4
9	(Uzbekistan) Farkhod Abdumavlyanov	(Uzbekistan) Lokomotiv Tashkent	3
9	(Brazil) Danilo Moura	(China) Shenzhen Nanling	3

== Final standing ==
Rank	Team
1st place, gold medalist(s)	(Japan) Nagoya Oceans
2nd place, silver medalist(s)	(Thailand) Chonburi Blue Wave
3rd place, bronze medalist(s)	(Iran) Dabiri Tabriz
4	(China) Shenzhen Nanling
5	(Kuwait) Al Qadsia
6	(Uzbekistan) Lokomotiv Tashkent
7	(Lebanon) Bank of Beirut SC
8	(Australia) Vic Vipers
