= 2012 AFC Futsal Club Championship =

Tournament details
- Host country: Kuwait
- City: Kuwait City
- Dates: July 1–6
- Teams: 8
- Venues: 2 (in 1 host city)

Final positions
- Champions: (Iran) Giti Pasand (1st title)
- Runners-up: (Uzbekistan) Ardus
- Third place: (Japan) Nagoya Oceans
- Fourth place: (Qatar) Al-Rayyan

Tournament statistics
- Matches played: 16
- Goals scored: 106 (6.63 per match)
- Attendance: 2,185 (137 per match)
- Top scorer: (Iran) Ahmad Esmaeilpour (9)
- Best player: (Iran) Mohammad Keshavarz

The 2012 AFC Futsal Club Championship was the 3rd AFC Futsal Club Championship. It was held in Kuwait City, Kuwait between July 1 and July 6, 2012.

On 21 November 2011 the AFC Futsal Committee, under the chairmanship of Guam's Richard Lai, proposed to award the hosting rights of the 2012 AFC Futsal Club Championship to Kuwait The draw for the tournament was held on 26 April 2012 in Movenpick Hotel, Kuwait City.

== Qualification ==
The national league champions of the three best placed teams in the 2011 Championship received a bye to the final as well as the host nation's champion. The remaining four spots were decided in two Asian qualifying tournaments.

Team	Qualified as
(Iran) Giti Pasand Isfahan	Iranian Super League 2011–12 Second
(Japan) Nagoya Oceans	F. League 2011–12 Winner
(Lebanon) All Sports	Lebanon Futsal League 2011–12 Winner
(Kuwait) Yarmouk	Kuwait Futsal 2011–12 Winner (host)
(Thailand) Government Housing Bank RBAC	East and Southeast 1st
(Vietnam) Thái Sơn Nam	East and Southeast 2nd
(Uzbekistan) Ardus Tashkent	South and Central 1st
(Qatar) Al-Rayyan	South and Central 2nd

== Venues ==
Kuwait City
Al-Yarmouk Futsal Stadium	Al-Arabi SC Futsal Stadium
Capacity:	Capacity:

== Group stage ==
=== Group A ===
Team	Pld	W	D	L	GF	GA	GD	Pts
(Iran) Giti Pasand	3	3	0	0	20	1	+19	9
(Qatar) Al-Rayyan	3	1	1	1	7	12	−5	4
(Kuwait) Yarmouk	3	1	0	2	10	10	0	3
(Vietnam) Thái Sơn Nam	3	0	1	2	2	16	−14	1

July 1
17:30

Giti Pasand (Iran)	8 – 0	(Vietnam) Thái Sơn Nam
Kazemi 3', 35'; Xapa 18', 34'; Esmaeilpour 29', 36'; Sharifzadeh 37'; Yousefi 39'	Report

Al-Yarmouk Futsal Stadium, Kuwait City
Attendance: 120
Referee: Naoki Miyatani (Japan)

July 1
20:00

Yarmouk (Kuwait)	3 – 5	(Qatar) Al-Rayyan
Thiago 1', 37'; Al-Awadhi 12'	Report	Shamari 5', 14'; Vadillo 15'; Minamoto 31'; Al-Sabah 40'

Al-Yarmouk Futsal Stadium, Kuwait City
Attendance: 150
Referee: Scott Kidson (Australia)

July 2
17:30

Al-Rayyan (Qatar)	0 – 7	(Iran) Giti Pasand
	Report	Esmaeilpour 5'; Yousefi 7'; Yousuf 7' (o.g.); Kazemi 10', 18'; Johar 37' (o.g.); Bandi 40'

Al-Yarmouk Futsal Stadium, Kuwait City
Attendance: 100
Referee: Nurdin Bukuev (Kyrgyzstan)

July 2
20:00

Thái Sơn Nam (Vietnam)	0 – 6	(Kuwait) Yarmouk
	Report	Nguyễn Bảo Quân 19' (o.g.); Mollaali 24'; Al-Taweel 29'; Hayat 31', 38'

Al-Yarmouk Futsal Stadium, Kuwait City
Attendance: 180
Referee: Mohamad Chami (Lebanon)

July 3
19:30

Yarmouk (Kuwait)	1 – 5	(Iran) Giti Pasand
Thiago 22'	Report	Esmaeilpour 10', 24', 25'; Bandi 23'; Taghizadeh 34'

Al-Yarmouk Futsal Stadium, Kuwait City
Attendance: 280
Referee: Shukhrat Pulatov (Uzbekistan)

July 3
19:30

Thái Sơn Nam (Vietnam)	2 – 2	(Qatar) Al-Rayyan
Phùng Trọng Luân 14'; Lê Quốc Nam 30'	Report	Mohssein 7'; Al-Sabah 24'

Al-Arabi SC Futsal Stadium, Kuwait City
Attendance: 90
Referee: Tomohiro Kozaki (Japan)

=== Group B ===
Team	Pld	W	D	L	GF	GA	GD	Pts
(Uzbekistan) Ardus	3	2	0	1	15	11	+4	6
(Japan) Nagoya Oceans	3	2	0	1	13	8	+5	6
(Lebanon) All Sports	3	1	1	1	11	10	+1	4
(Thailand) GH Bank RBAC	3	0	1	2	7	17	−10	1

July 1
12:30

All Sports (Lebanon)	3 – 3	(Thailand) GH Bank RBAC
Willian 18'; Kawsan 24'; El Homsi 39'	Report	Saisorn 7'; Wongkaeo 29' (pen.); Janta 39'

Al-Yarmouk Futsal Stadium, Kuwait City
Attendance: 115
Referee: Alireza Sohrabi (Iran)

July 1
15:00

Nagoya Oceans (Japan)	3 – 4	(Uzbekistan) Ardus
Morioka 1'; Yoshikawa 29'; Henmi 36'	Report	Shlema 16'; Irsaliev 31', 36'; Hernández 32'

Al-Yarmouk Futsal Stadium, Kuwait City
Attendance: 100
Referee: Abdulrahman Abdulqader (Bahrain)

July 2
12:30

Ardus (Uzbekistan)	2 – 6	(Lebanon) All Sports
Shlema 14'; Hernández 32'	Report	Tneich 24'; Takaji 29', 40'; El Homsi 31', 40'; Marques 40'

Al-Yarmouk Futsal Stadium, Kuwait City
Attendance: 100
Referee: Kim Jang-Kwan (South Korea)

July 2
15:00

GH Bank RBAC (Thailand)	2 – 5	(Japan) Nagoya Oceans
Saisorn 5'; Thueanklang 18'	Report	Morioka 2', 5'; Yoshikawa 15'; Watanabe 38'; Kitahara 39'

Al-Yarmouk Futsal Stadium, Kuwait City
Attendance: 100
Referee: Mohammad Al-Haddad (Kuwait)

July 3
16:00

Nagoya Oceans (Japan)	5 – 2	(Lebanon) All Sports
Henmi 3', 26'; Kogure 17'; Yoshikawa 30', 35'	Report	Katakeyama 25'; Kawahara 27' (o.g.)

Al-Yarmouk Futsal Stadium, Kuwait City
Attendance: 120
Referee: Samsudin Bin Ibrahim (Malaysia)

July 3
16:00

GH Bank RBAC (Thailand)	2 – 9	(Uzbekistan) Ardus
Saisorn 10'; Oliveira 38'	Report	Irsaliev 11', 22', 23', 37'; Hernández 12' (pen.), 40'; Sharipov 31', 39'; Umarov 39'

Al-Arabi SC Futsal Stadium, Kuwait City
Attendance: 70
Referee: Mahmoud Nassirloo (Iran)

== Knockout stage ==
Semi-finals
July 5 – Kuwait City
(Iran) Giti Pasand	6
(Japan) Nagoya Oceans	3
July 5 – Kuwait City
(Uzbekistan) Ardus	3
(Qatar) Al-Rayyan	1

Final
July 6 – Kuwait City
(Iran) Giti Pasand	2
(Uzbekistan) Ardus	1
Third place
July 6 – Kuwait City
(Japan) Nagoya Oceans	4
(Qatar) Al-Rayyan	1

=== Semi-finals ===
July 5
16:00

Giti Pasand (Iran)	6 – 3	(Japan) Nagoya Oceans
Esmaeilpour 14', 39', 40'; Kazemi 19'; Keshavarz 37'; Samimi 38'	Report	Mori 7'; Yoshikawa 25'; Morioka 40'

Al-Yarmouk Futsal Stadium, Kuwait City
Attendance: 140
Referee: Nurdin Bukuev (Kyrgyzstan)

July 5
19:30

Ardus (Uzbekistan)	3 – 1	(Qatar) Al-Rayyan
Yunusov 9'; Irsaliev 31'; Tojiboev 39'	Report	Bilal 32'

Al-Yarmouk Futsal Stadium, Kuwait City
Attendance: 130
Referee: Kim Jang-Kwan (South Korea)

=== Third place play-off ===
July 6
16:00

Nagoya Oceans (Japan)	4 – 1	(Qatar) Al-Rayyan
Henmi 9', 36'; Kitahara 14'; Mori 31'	Report	Vadillo 13'

Al-Yarmouk Futsal Stadium, Kuwait City
Attendance: 120
Referee: Shukhrat Pulatov (Uzbekistan)

=== Final ===
July 6
19:30

Giti Pasand (Iran)	2 – 1	(Uzbekistan) Ardus
Kazemi 3'; Xapa 24'	Report	Yunusov 21'

Al-Yarmouk Futsal Stadium, Kuwait City
Attendance: 270
Referee: Naoki Miyatani (Japan)

== Awards ==
AFC Futsal Club Championship
2012 Champions

Giti Pasand
First Title

- Most Valuable Player
  - (Iran) Mohammad Keshavarz
- Top Scorer
  - (Iran) Ahmad Esmaeilpour (9 goals)
- Fair-Play Award
  - (Japan) Nagoya Oceans
- All-Star Team
  - (Uzbekistan) Rustam Umarov (Ardus) (GK)
  - (Iran) Mohammad Keshavarz (Giti Pasand)
  - (Japan) Rafael Henmi (Nagoya Oceans)
  - (Iran) Ahmad Esmaeilpour (Giti Pasand)
  - (Peru) Kaoru Morioka (Nagoya Oceans)
- Reserve All-Star Team
  - (Iran) Alireza Samimi (Giti Pasand) (GK)
  - (Qatar) Amro Mohssein (Al-Rayyan)
  - (Iran) Afshin Kazemi (Giti Pasand)
  - (Uzbekistan) Dilshod Irsaliev (Ardus)
  - (Lebanon) Khaled Takaji (All Sports)
  - Coach: (Iran) Alireza Afzal (Giti Pasand)

== Final standing ==
Rank	Team
1st place, gold medalist(s)	(Iran) Giti Pasand Isfahan
2nd place, silver medalist(s)	(Uzbekistan) Ardus Tashkent
3rd place, bronze medalist(s)	(Japan) Nagoya Oceans
4	(Qatar) Al-Rayyan
5	(Lebanon) All Sports
6	(Kuwait) Yarmouk
7	(Thailand) Government Housing Bank RBAC
8	(Vietnam) Thái Sơn Nam

== Top scorers ==
Locations of clubs in 2012 AFC Futsal Club Championship

Rank	Player	Club	Goals
1	(Iran) Ahmad Esmaeilpour	(Iran) Giti Pasand	9
2	(Uzbekistan) Dilshod Irsaliev	(Uzbekistan) Ardus	7
3	(Iran) Afshin Kazemi	(Iran) Giti Pasand	6
4	(Japan) Rafael Henmi	(Japan) Nagoya Oceans	5
4	(Japan) Tomoki Yoshikawa	(Japan) Nagoya Oceans	5
6	(Spain) Carmelo Hernández	(Uzbekistan) Ardus	4
6	(Japan) Kaoru Morioka	(Japan) Nagoya Oceans	4
8	(Lebanon) Ali El Homsi	(Lebanon) All Sports	3
8	(Brazil) Xapa	(Iran) Giti Pasand	3
8	(Thailand) Panomkorn Saisorn	(Thailand) GH Bank RBAC	3
8	(Azerbaijan) Thiago	(Kuwait) Yarmouk	3
