= 2013 AFC Futsal Club Championship =

Tournament details
- Host country: Japan
- City: Nagoya
- Dates: Aug 27 – Sep 1
- Teams: 8
- Venues: 2 (in 2 host cities)

Final positions
- Champions: (Thailand) Chonburi Blue Wave (1st title)
- Runners-up: (Iran) Giti Pasand Isfahan
- Third place: (Japan) Nagoya Oceans
- Fourth place: (China) Shenzhen Nanling

Tournament statistics
- Matches played: 16
- Goals scored: 96 (6 per match)
- Attendance: 9,300 (581 per match)
- Top scorer: (Japan) Kaoru Morioka (8 goals)
- Best player: (Thailand) Suphawut Thueanklang

The 2013 AFC Futsal Club Championship was the 4th AFC Futsal Club Championship.It was held in Nagoya, Japan between 27 Aug and 1 Sep, 2013.

== Bid process ==
Japan beat bids from, Iran, and Uzbekistan.

== Draw ==
The draw for the finals of the AFC Futsal Club Championship Japan 2013 will be held on Friday, June 14 and will take place at the Petaling Jaya Hilton Hotel in Malaysia. Eight teams are in the fray including host club Nagoya Oceans and defending champions Giti Pasand Isfahan

The 8 teams were drawn in two groups, each group with four teams.

== Qualification ==
Locations of clubs in 2013 AFC Futsal Club Championship

The national league champions of the three best placed teams in the 2012 Championship received a bye to the final as well as the host nation's champion. The remaining four spots were decided in two Asian qualifying tournaments.

Team	Qualified as
(Iran) Giti Pasand Isfahan	Iranian Super League 2012–13 Champions
(Japan) Nagoya Oceans	F. League 2012–13 Champions / Host
(Uzbekistan) Ardus Tashkent	Uzbekistan Futsal League season 2012 Champions
(Thailand) Chonburi Blue Wave	East and Southeast 1st
(China) Shenzhen Nanling	East and Southeast 2nd
(Vietnam) Thai Son Nam	East and Southeast 3rd
(Qatar) Al Sadd	South and Central 1st
(Lebanon) Al Sadaka	South and Central 2nd

== Venues ==
Nagoya	Komaki
Teva Ocean Arena	Park Arena Komaki
Capacity: 2,569	Capacity: 5,000

== Group stage ==
=== Group A ===
Team	Pld	W	D	L	GF	GA	GD	Pts
(Japan) Nagoya Oceans	3	3	0	0	15	5	+10	9
(China) Shenzhen Nanling	3	1	1	1	8	10	−2	4
(Lebanon) Al Sadaka	3	1	0	2	12	10	+2	3
(Vietnam) Thai Son Nam	3	0	1	2	5	15	−10	1

- The standings are based on points, head-to-head, goal-difference and number of goals of the teams tied
August 27
17:00

Shenzhen Nanling (China)	2–2	(Vietnam) Thai Son Nam
M. Daneshvar 17'; Danilo 22'	Report	J. Rodriguez Cruz 36'; N. Bao Quan 39'

Ocean Arena, Nagoya
Attendance: 530
Referee: Samsudin Ibrahim (Malaysia)

August 27
19:30

Nagoya Oceans (Japan)	4–2	(Lebanon) Al Sadaka
R. Sakai 14'; K. Morioka 20'; B. Čizmar 25' (o.g.); Watanabe 26'	Report	K. Zeid 2', 36'

Ocean Arena, Nagoya
Attendance: 694
Referee: Mamhoud Reza Nasirloo (Iran)

August 28
17:00

Al Sadaka (Lebanon)	4–5	(China) Shenzhen Nanling
K. Kawsan 18'; K. Zeid 36', 37'; A. El Homsi 39'	Report	M. Daneshvar 1', 3'; Danilo 22'; He 28', 39'

Ocean Arena, Nagoya
Attendance: 457
Referee: Nurdin Bukuev (Kyrgyzstan)

August 28
19:30

Thai Son Nam (Vietnam)	2–7	(Japan) Nagoya Oceans
Bruno 12'; N. Trong Thien 38'	Report	Yoshikawa 11'; K. Morioka 14', 18', 19', 20'; Y. Murota 23'; Pedro Costa 33'

Ocean Arena, Nagoya
Attendance: 668
Referee: Ali Reza Sohrabi Balsini (Iran)

August 29
19:30

Nagoya Oceans (Japan)	4–1	(China) Shenzhen Nanling
R. Sakai 2', 14'; Watanabe 9'; J.H. Shin 21'	Report	Esteves 34'

Ocean Arena, Nagoya
Attendance: 657
Referee: Kim Jang Kwan (Korea Republic)

August 29
19:30

Thai Son Nam (Vietnam)	1–6	(Lebanon) Al Sadaka
Bruno 14'	Report	K. Zeid 4', 32'; A. El Homsi 9'; B. Čizmar 22'; M. Gorges 36'; S. Akil 39'

Park Arena Komaki, Komaki
Attendance: 355
Referee: Samsudin Ibrahim (Malaysia)

=== Group B ===
Team	Pld	W	D	L	GF	GA	GD	Pts
(Thailand) Chonburi Blue Wave	3	2	1	0	9	7	+2	7
(Iran) Giti Pasand Isfahan	3	2	0	1	8	7	+1	6
(Qatar) Al Sadd	3	1	0	2	9	9	0	3
(Uzbekistan) Ardus Tashkent	3	0	1	2	6	9	−3	1

August 27
12:00

Ardus Tashkent (Uzbekistan)	2–2	(Thailand) Chonburi Blue Wave
D. Rakhmatov 27', 33'	Report	Apiwat 16'; Jirawat 27'

Ocean Arena, Nagoya
Attendance: 279
Referee: Mohamad Chami (Lebanon)

August 27
14:30

Giti Pasand Isfahan (Iran)	3–2	(Qatar) Al Sadd
A. Esmaeilpour 1'; M. Taheri 3'; M. Javid 37'	Report	S. Samih 6', 25'

Ocean Arena, Nagoya
Attendance: 404
Referee: Kim Jang-Kwan (South Korea)

August 28
12:00

Al Sadd (Qatar)	5–3	(Uzbekistan) Ardus Tashkent
S. Jamoliddin 23' (o.g.); M. Ismail 24'; S. Samih 36'; M. Ibrahim 38', 40'	Report	F. Abdumavlyanov 5'; A. Yunosov 18'; Sh. Tojiboev 39'

Ocean Arena, Nagoya
Attendance: 259
Referee: Miyatani Naoki (Japan)

August 28
14:30

Chonburi Blue Wave (Thailand)	4–3	(Iran) Giti Pasand Isfahan
Jirawat 7'; Nattawut 37', 40'; Xapa 39'	Report	A. Esmaeilpour 15'; H. Tayyebi 21'; M. Taheri 29'

Ocean Arena, Nagoya
Attendance: 377
Referee: Scott Kidson (Australia)

August 29
16:30

Giti Pasand Isfahan (Iran)	2–1	(Uzbekistan) Ardus Tashkent
M. Taheri 2'; M. Javid 39'	Report	D. Rakhmatov 37'

Ocean Arena, Nagoya
Attendance: 345
Referee: Nurdin Bukuev (Kyrgyzstan)

August 29
16:30

Chonburi Blue Wave (Thailand)	3–2	(Qatar) Al Sadd
Suphawut 1', 38'; Kritsada 13'	Report	S. Samih 5', 17'

Park Arena Komaki, Komaki
Attendance: 312
Referee: Miyatani Naoki (Japan)

== Knockout stage ==
Semi-finals
August 31 – Nagoya
(Japan) Nagoya Oceans	2
(Iran) Giti Pasand Isfahan	3
August 31 – Nagoya
(Thailand) Chonburi Blue Wave	5
(China) Shenzhen Nanling	2

Final
September 1 – Nagoya
(Iran) Giti Pasand Isfahan	1 (1)
(Thailand) Chonburi Blue Wave	1 (4) (pen.)
Third place
September 1 – Nagoya
(Japan) Nagoya Oceans	6
(China) Shenzhen Nanling	4

=== Semi-finals ===
August 31
16:00

Nagoya Oceans (Japan)	2–3	(Iran) Giti Pasand Isfahan
W. Kitahara 9'; Yoshikawa 32'	Report	A. Kazemi 16'; T. Mortazavi 18'; H. Tayyebi 39'

Ocean Arena, Nagoya
Attendance: 1,321
Referee: Scott Kidson (Australia)

August 31
19:00

Chonburi Blue Wave (Thailand)	5–2	(China) Shenzhen Nanling
Xapa 3'; S. Thueanklang 8', 15'; T. Santanaprasit 16', 16'	Report	Z. Jianfa 7'; M. Daneshvar 40'

Ocean Arena, Nagoya
Attendance: 511
Referee: Nurdin Bukuev (Kyrgyzstan)

=== Third place play-off ===
September 1
16:30

Nagoya Oceans (Japan)	6–4	(China) Shenzhen Nanling
K. Morioka 16', 26', 36'; Shinoda 18'; Pedro Costa 18'; Shira 21'	Report	He 8', 15'; M. Daneshvar 19', 28'

Ocean Arena, Nagoya
Attendance: 1,398
Referee: Nurdin Bukuev (Kyrgyzstan)

=== Final ===
September 1
19:00

Giti Pasand Isfahan (Iran)	1–1 (a.e.t.)	(Thailand) Chonburi Blue Wave
H. Tayyebi 4'	Report	S. Thueanklang 39'
Penalties
Mohammad Taheri (penalty scored); Afshin Kazemi (penalty missed); Mehdi Javid (penalty missed)	1–4	(penalty scored) Suphawut Thueanklang; (penalty scored) Kritsada Wongkaeo; (penalty scored) Nattawut Madyalan; (penalty scored) Jirawat Sornwichian

Ocean Arena, Nagoya
Attendance: 733
Referee: Miyatani Naoki (Japan)

== Awards ==
AFC Futsal Club Championship
2013 Champions

Chonburi Blue Wave
First Title

- Most Valuable Player
  - (Thailand) Suphawut Thueanklang
- Top Scorer
  - (Japan) Kaoru Morioka (8 goals)
- Fair-Play Award
  - (China) Shenzhen Nanling

== Final standing ==
Rank	Team
1st place, gold medalist(s)	(Thailand) Chonburi Blue Wave
2nd place, silver medalist(s)	(Iran) Giti Pasand Isfahan
3rd place, bronze medalist(s)	(Japan) Nagoya Oceans
4	(China) Shenzhen Nanling
5	(Lebanon) Al Sadaka
6	(Qatar) Al Sadd
7	(Uzbekistan) Ardus Tashkent
8	(Vietnam) Thai Son Nam

== Top scorers ==
Rank	Player	Club	Goals
1	(Japan) Kaoru Morioka	(Japan) Nagoya Oceans	8
2	(Lebanon) Karim Abou Zeid	(Lebanon) Al Sadaka	6
2	(Iran) Masoud Daneshvar	(China) Shenzhen Nanling	6
4	(Qatar) Samer Samih	(Qatar) Al Sadd	5
4	(Thailand) Suphawut Thueanklang	(Thailand) Chonburi Blue Wave	5
6	(China) He	(China) Shenzhen Nanling	4
7	(Iran) Mohammad Taheri	(Iran) Giti Pasand Isfahan	3
7	(Iran) Hossein Tayyebi	(Iran) Giti Pasand Isfahan	3
7	(Japan) Rafael Sakai	(Japan) Nagoya Oceans	3
7	(Uzbekistan) Dilshod Rakhmatov	(Uzbekistan) Ardus Tashkent	3
