= Rabie El Kakhi =

Lebanese football player and coach

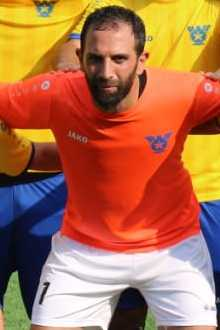
- El Kakhi with Safa in 2019

Personal information
- Full name: Rabie Jamil Najib El Kakhi
- Date of birth: 9 August 1984 (age 42)
- Place of birth: Maracaibo, Venezuela
- Height: 1.82 m (6 ft 0 in)
- Position: Goalkeeper

Senior career*
Years	Team	Apps	(Gls)
2005–2011	Safa		
2011–2015	Akhaa Ahli Aley	62	(0)
2011	Sadaka (futsal)		
2015–2017	Nejmeh	13	(0)
2017–2019	Ansar	12	(0)
2019–2021	Safa	7	(0)
2022–2023	Safa	23	(0)

International career
2011–2013	Lebanon	4	(0)
2011–2021	Lebanon (futsal)		

Managerial career
- 2021–2022: Akhaa Ahli Aley (goalkeeper)
- * Club domestic league appearances and goals as of 14:50, 7 July 2023 (UTC)

Rabie Jamil Najib El Kakhi (Arabic: ربيع جميل نجيب الكاخي; born 9 August 1984) is a football coach and former player. Born in Venezuela, he represented Lebanon internationally as a goalkeeper in both football and futsal.

== Club career ==
El Kakhi began his career at Safa. He moved to Akhaa Ahli Aley in 2011, simultaneously playing futsal for Sadaka in 2011. He was nominated among the best five futsal goalkeepers for 2011.

El Kakhi joined Nejmeh on 23 September 2015, on a five-year contract. On 4 August 2017, El Kakhi moved to Ansar; he returned to Safa on 8 August 2019. On 18 July 2021, El Kakhi announced his retirement. He returned from retirement on 12 February 2022, moving to Safa for a third time. He played eight games in 2021–22 and 15 games in 2022–23.

== International career ==
Having already represented the Lebanon national futsal team, El Kakhi returned to the team for the 2021 FIFA Futsal World Cup qualification matches against Vietnam.

== Coaching career ==
On 3 August 2021, El Kakhi was appointed goalkeeper coach of Akhaa Ahli Aley. He remained until February 2022, when he returned to play football.

== Honours ==
Safa

- Lebanese Elite Cup: 2009
- Lebanese FA Cup runner-up: 2007–08, 2010–11
- Lebanese Challenge Cup runner-up: 2022

Nejmeh

- Lebanese FA Cup: 2015–16
- Lebanese Elite Cup: 2016
- Lebanese Super Cup: 2016

Individual

- Lebanese Premier League Best Save: 2004–05

== See also ==
- List of Lebanon international footballers born outside Lebanon
