= Maccabi Hakoah Futsal Club =

Maccabi Hakoah
- Full name: Maccabi Hakoah Futsal Club
- Nickname(s): Maccabi
- Founded: 2008
- Chairman: Gareth Naar
- Coach: Steven Knight
- League: F-League
- Website: http://www.eastcoastheatfc.com/East_Coast_Heat/Home.html

Maccabi Hakoah Futsal Club is an Australian futsal club based in Sydney, New South Wales. They play in the F-League which is the top tier of Australian Futsal. The club was founded by Gareth Naar in 2008.

== History ==
In 2011 the club was the inaugural winner of the newly formed F-League competition. Due to their success the club qualified to participate in the 2012 AFC Futsal Club Championship.

== Club honors ==
- 2011 F-League Champions
- NSW Super League Minor Premiers
- NSW Super League Final Series Runners Up
- NZ National League Champions
