= Boris Čizmar =

Serbian futsal player

Čizmar
Personal information
- Full name: Boris Čizmar
- Date of birth: 28 August 1984 (age 42)
- Place of birth: SFR Yugoslavia
- Positions: Defender; winger

Team information
- Current team: FC Kemi Finland

Senior career*
Years	Team	Apps	(Gls)
28	KMF Liman(Serbia), KMF Tango( Serbia), AL-Gharaffa(Qatar), KMF Kolubara Lazarevac(Serbia), KMF Marbo-intermezzo (Serbia), Al-Sadaka Club(Lebanon), Deus (Serbia), JSK(Lebanon), Louazie (Lebanon), FC Kemi (Finland)		(0)

International career
- Serbia
- * Club domestic league appearances and goals

Boris Čizmar (born 28 August 1984), is a Serbian futsal player who plays for FC Kemi in Finland and ex player of Serbia national futsal team.
