= Vic Vipers Futsal Club =

Vic Vipers
- Full name: Vic Vipers Futsal Club
- Nickname(s): Vipers
- Founded: 1999
- Ground: Victoria Futsal Complex
- Manager: Milton Sakkos
- League: F-League; Victoria Futsal League
- Website: http://thefleague.com.au/vicvipers/

Vic Vipers Futsal Club is an Australian futsal club based in Victoria. They play in the F-League which is the top tier of Australian Futsal. The Vic Vipers was founded in late 1999 by Futsal Victoria.
