= Rafael Henmi =

Japanese futsal player

Personal information
- Full name: Rafael Katsutoshi Henmi
- Date of birth: 30 July 1992 (age 34)
- Place of birth: Japan
- Height: 1.69 m (5 ft 7 in)
- Position: Winger

Senior career*
Years	Team	Apps	(Gls)
2012	Nagoya Oceans		
2012–2013	Al Wasl SC		
2013	Nagoya Oceans		
2013–2022	Benfica	150	(51)
2022–2023	Real Betis FSN		
2023–	Braga		

International career
- Japan
- * Club domestic league appearances and goals

Rafael Katsutoshi Henmi (born 30 July 1992) is a Japanese futsal player that plays as a winger for Portuguese club Sporting Clube de Braga/AAUM and played for the Japan national team.

== Honours ==
Benfica

- Campeonato Nacional: 2014–15, 2018–19
- Taça de Portugal: 2014–15, 2016–17
- Taça da Liga: 2017–18, 2018–19, 2019–20
- Supertaça de Portugal: 2016

Sporting positions
Preceded by (Iran) Mohammad Keshavarz	Asian Futsaler of the Year; 2012	Succeeded by (Thailand) Suphawut Thueanklang
Preceded by (Iran) Mohammad Taheri	AFC Futsal Championship MVP; 2012	Succeeded by (Iran) Ali Asghar Hassanzadeh
