= Pelindo =

Indonesian seaport operator, developer and investor

PT Pelabuhan Indonesia (Persero)
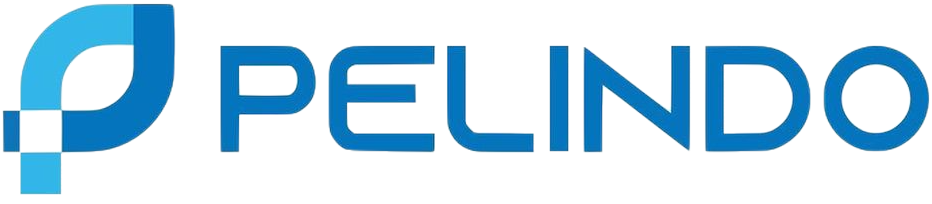
- Type: Port operator State-owned enterprise
- Industry: Transport; Container terminals
- Founded: 1992
- Headquarters: Jakarta, Indonesia
- Area served: West Sumatra; Jambi; South Sumatra; Bengkulu; Lampung; Bangka Belitung; Banten; Jakarta; West Java; East Java; West Kalimantan.
- Key people: Achmad Muchtasyar (CEO/President Director); Drajat Sulistyo (Vice President Director); Farid Padang (Director of Commercial); M. Suriawan Wakan (Director of Engineering); Prasetyadi (Director of Operation); Bachtiar Soeria Atmadja (Director of Finance); Dwi Fatan Lilyana (Director of Human Resources and General Affairs); Boy Robyanto (Director of Risk Management); Prasetyo (Director of Business Development); Hendri Ginting (Director of Institutional Relations)
- Revenue: ▲ Rp 35.48 trillion (2025)
- Net income: ▲ Rp4.36 trillion (2025)
- Total assets: ▲ Rp 52.04 trillion (2019)
- Owner: Government of Indonesia through Danantara
- Number of employees: 11,132 (2016)
- Subsidiaries: List: Pelindo Terminal Petikemas Pelindo Multi Terminal Pelindo Sinergi Lokaseva Pelindo Jasa Maritim IPC Multi Terminal PT RS Pelabuhan IPC Car Terminal IPC Dredging Service IPC Container Terminal IPC Eco Power IPC Indonesia Container Terminal Koja Container Terminal IPC Marine Service IPC Maritime Edu Center IPC Port Developer IPC Port Equipment IPC Port Operator
- Website: pelindo.co.id

PT Pelabuhan Indonesia (Persero), trading as Pelindo (English: Indonesian Ports Company or IPC), is Indonesian state-owned port operation company that offers an integrated port service throughout Indonesia. Pelindo officially founded on 1 October 2021 as a result of integration between four state-owned enterprises PT Pelindo I (Persero), PT Pelindo II (Persero), PT Pelindo III (Persero) and PT Pelindo IV (Persero); with PT Pelindo II as the surviving company. The establishment of Pelindo is a strategic initiative of the government as a shareholder to realize national connectivity and a stronger logistics ecosystem network. Maritime connectivity is projected to improve, whether it is local ports, or international ports.

== See also ==
- Port authority
- List of ports in Indonesia
- List of islands of Indonesia
- Ministry of Transportation (Indonesia)
- Transport in Indonesia
