= Al Rayyan SC Futsal Team =

Al Rayyan Sports Club
- Full name: Al Rayyan Futsal Team
- Nicknames: The Lions; Al-Raheeb (The Fearful)
- Founded: 2016; 9 years ago
- Ground: Al Rayyan Sports Complex; Al-Rayyan
- Capacity: 2,000
- Chairman: Sheikh Abdullah bin Hamad Al Thani
- League: Qatar Futsal League
Home colours	Third colours

Al Rayyan Futsal Team is part of Al Rayyan Sports Club in Qatar. It is based in Umm Al Afaei, Al Rayyan. The team was founded in 2006. Since the Qatar professional futsal league started in 2006/2007, Al Rayyan were the main force in Qatar. They won the first Qatar professional league when it first started in 2006/2007. Al Rayyan won the first Qatar Association Cup in 2008/2009, beating Qatar SC 7–5 in the final. In addition to the first league and cup titles, Al Rayyan secured the first Qatar Futsal Super Cup in 2010/2011 after beating Al Sadd 3–2 in a thrilling encounter. In the first time in the history of futsal in Qatar, the winner of the league would be decided by a play-off. Al Rayyan subsequently won their third league title by beating Al Gharafa 3–2 and 4–3 in both final games sealing their second consecutive league title.

Al Rayyan hosted the second AFC champions league tournament during 26-6-2011 and 1-7-2011. In May 2011 Al Rayyan signed two Iranian international stars on loan from Foolad Mahan to participate in the AFC Champions League 2011: Mohammad Taheri (the best Asian player in 2010) and Ali Hassanzadeh.

The team finished fourth, losing in the semi-finals to Shahid Mansouri from Iran 6–5 after extra time in a controversial match. Al Rayyan got the Fair Play Award and Ali Hassanzadeh won the tournament top scorer with 10 goals.

== Season to season ==
Season	Division	Place	Qatar Federation Cup	Super Cup	AFC Club Championship
2006/07	QFL	1st	Not Held	Not Held	Not Held
2007/08	QFL	2nd	Not Held	Not Held	Not Held
2008/09	QFL	2nd	1st	Not Held	Not Held
2009/2010	QFL	1st	Semi-finalist	Not Held	not qualified
2010/2011	QFL	1st	Finalist	1st	4th
2011/2012	QFL	??	??	Finalist	4th

== Former head coaches ==
- (Morocco) Hassan Rhouila 2006–2007
- (Morocco) Adil Sayeh 2007
- (Bosnia and Herzegovina) Dževad Habibija 2007-2008
- (Morocco) Hassan Rhouila 2008-2011
- (Spain) Juanito 2011–2012

== Club honours ==
- 3 Qatar League (2006–2007) (2009–2010) (2010–2011)
- 1 Qatar Association Cup (2008–2009)
- 1 Qatar Super Cup (2010–2011)
