= Wataru Kitahara =

Japanese futsal player

Personal information
- Full name: Wataru Kitahara
- Date of birth: 2 August 1982 (age 44)
- Place of birth: Tokyo, Japan
- Height: 1.79 m (5 ft 10 1/2 in)
- Position: Defender

International career
Years	Team	Apps	(Gls)
–	Japan		

Wataru Kitahara (北原 亘, Kitahara Wataru; born 2 August 1982) is a Japanese futsal player. Japanese national futsal team.

== Club ==
- 2007-2016 Nagoya Oceans

== Titles ==
- F.League (9)
  - 2007–08, 2008–09, 2009–10, 2010–11, 2011–12, 2012–13, 2013–14, 2014–15, 2015–16
- All Japan Futsal Championship (4)
  - 2007, 2013, 2014, 2015
- F.League Ocean Cup (5)
  - 2010, 2011, 2012, 2013, 2014
- AFC Futsal Club Championship (3)
  - 2011, 2014, 2016
