= Suphawut Thueanklang =

Thai futsal player

Personal information
- Full name: Suphawut Thueanklang
- Date of birth: 14 July 1989 (age 37)
- Place of birth: Ratchaburi, Thailand
- Height: 1.79 m (5 ft 10 1/2 in)
- Position: Pivot

Team information
- Current team: Chonburi Bluewave
- Number: 9

Youth career
- 2001–2006: Photha Wattana Senee School

Senior career*
Years	Team	Apps	(Gls)
2007–	Chonburi Bluewave	144	(231)
2010	→ Santiago Futsal (loan)		
2011	→ Persepolis (loan)		
2016–2017	→ Mes Sungun (loan)	8	(6)
2018	→ Black Steel (loan)	8	(6)
2019	→ Bank of Beirut (loan)	4	(4)
2020–2022	→ Nagoya Oceans (loan)	4	(1)

International career^{‡}
2008–	Thailand Futsal	96	(191)
Medal record
Thailand national football team
Sea Games
Gold medal – first place	2011 Southeast Asian Games	Futsal
AFF Futsal Championship
Gold medal – first place	AFF Futsal Championship 2008	Futsal
Gold medal – first place	AFF Futsal Championship 2009	Futsal
Gold medal – first place	AFF Futsal Championship 2012	Futsal
Gold medal – first place	AFF Futsal Championship 2019	Futsal
Asian Indoor Games
Silver medal – second place	Asian Indoor Games 2009	Futsal
Asian Championship
Silver medal – second place	AFC Futsal Championship 2012	Futsal
Silver medal – second place	AFC Futsal Championship 2024	Futsal
- * Club domestic league appearances and goals ‡ National team caps and goals as of 13:05, 23 May 2008 (UTC)

Suphawut Thueanklang (Thai: ศุภวุฒิ เถื่อนกลาง; born July 14, 1989) is a Thai futsal pivot and currently a member of Thailand national futsal team.

== Honours ==
=== Domestic ===
All with Chonburi Bluewave Futsal Club

- Thailand Futsal League
  - Winners (7): 2009, 2010, 2011–2012, 2012–2013, 2014, 2015, 2016
- Thai FA Futsal Cup
  - Winners (4): 2010, 2011–2012, 2014, 2015

All with Nagoya Oceans

- F.League
  - Winners (2): 2020-21, 2021–22

=== Continental ===
- AFC Futsal Club Championship
  - Winners (2): 2013, 2017

=== Individual ===
- 2012 FIFA Futsal World Cup Goal of The Tournament
- 2013 AFC Futsal Club Championship Qualification Asean/East Zone Top Scorer
- 2013 AFC Futsal Club Championship Most Valuable Player
- 2013 AFC Futsal Player of the Year
- 2016 AFC Futsal Championship Top Scorer (14 goals)
- 2016 FIFA Futsal World Cup Goal of The Tournament

== International career ==
=== International honours ===
- AFC Futsal Asian Cup
  - Runners-up (2): 2012, 2024
  - Third place (1): 2016
- Asian Indoor Games
  - Runners-up (1): 2009
  - Third place (1): 2013
- AFF Futsal Championship
  - Winners (6): 2008, 2009, 2012, 2013, 2014, 2015, 2019
- Southeast Asian Games
  - Winners (3): 2011, 2013, 2017

=== International goals ===
Suphawut Thueanklang's international goals
#	Date	Venue	Opponent	Score	Result	Goals	Competition
1.	27 August 2008	Bangkok, Thailand	Philippines	5–4	won	2	2008 AFF Futsal Championship
2.	30 August 2008	Bangkok, Thailand	Malaysia	4–0	won	1	2008 AFF Futsal Championship
3.	31 August 2008	Bangkok, Thailand	Indonesia	5–1	won	3	2008 AFF Futsal Championship
4.	8 June 2009	Ho Chi Minh City, Vietnam	Myanmar	16–6	won	2	2009 AFF Futsal Championship
5.	9 June 2009	Ho Chi Minh City, Vietnam	Malaysia	7–3	won	1	2009 AFF Futsal Championship
6.	12 June 2009	Ho Chi Minh City, Vietnam	Philippines	8–2	won	1	2009 AFF Futsal Championship
7.	14 June 2009	Ho Chi Minh City, Vietnam	Vietnam	4–1	won	1	2009 AFF Futsal Championship
8.	29 October 2009	Ho Chi Minh City, Vietnam	Japan	4–2	won	1	2009 Asian Indoor Games
9.	2 November 2009	Ho Chi Minh City, Vietnam	Tajikistan	6–2	won	1	2009 Asian Indoor Games
10.	4 November 2009	Ho Chi Minh City, Vietnam	Kuwait	7–4	won	1	2009 Asian Indoor Games
11.	5 November 2009	Ho Chi Minh City, Vietnam	Uzbekistan	3–1	won	1	2009 Asian Indoor Games
12.	7 November 2009	Ho Chi Minh City, Vietnam	Iran	3–3 pen 4-5	lost	1	2009 Asian Indoor Games
13.	9 April 2010	Udon Thani, Thailand	Iran	3–4	lost	1	Friendly
14.	10 April 2010	Udon Thani, Thailand	Uzbekistan	3–1	won	1	Friendly
15.	18 May 2010	Bangkok, Thailand	Australia	8–1	won	1	Friendly
16.	23 May 2010	Tashkent, Uzbekistan	Kyrgyzstan	4–2	won	1	2010 AFC Futsal Championship
17.	24 May 2010	Tashkent, Uzbekistan	South Korea	9–2	won	2	2010 AFC Futsal Championship
18.	25 May 2010	Tashkent, Uzbekistan	Vietnam	5–2	won	2	2010 AFC Futsal Championship
19.	27 May 2010	Tashkent, Uzbekistan	China	2–9	lost	1	2010 AFC Futsal Championship
20.	9 December 2010	Bangkok, Thailand	Vietnam	7–0	won	1	Friendly
21.	11 December 2010	Bangkok, Thailand	Japan	3–4	lost	1	Friendly
22.	12 December 2010	Bangkok, Thailand	Japan	2–0	won	1	Friendly
23.	17 November 2011	Jakata, Indonesia	Myanmar	17–0	won	3	2011 Southeast Asian Games
24.	18 November 2011	Jakata, Indonesia	Malaysia	9–2	won	3	2011 Southeast Asian Games
25.	22 November 2011	Jakata, Indonesia	Vietnam	8–3	won	3	2011 Southeast Asian Games
26.	21 February 2012	Bangkok, Thailand	Myanmar	13–0	won	4	2012 AFC Futsal Championship qualification
27.	22 February 2012	Bangkok, Thailand	Philippines	17–2	won	3	2012 AFC Futsal Championship qualification
28.	23 February 2012	Bangkok, Thailand	Indonesia	5–2	won	1	2012 AFC Futsal Championship qualification
29.	25 February 2012	Bangkok, Thailand	Australia	7–0	won	3	2012 AFC Futsal Championship qualification
30.	26 February 2012	Bangkok, Thailand	Indonesia	3–1	won	1	2012 AFC Futsal Championship qualification
31.	20 April 2012	Bangkok, Thailand	Brunei	22–0	won	5	2012 AFF Futsal Championship
32.	21 April 2012	Bangkok, Thailand	Laos	26–2	won	6	2012 AFF Futsal Championship
33.	23 April 2012	Bangkok, Thailand	Indonesia	6–1	won	2	2012 AFF Futsal Championship
34.	25 April 2012	Bangkok, Thailand	Malaysia	12–1	won	5	2012 AFF Futsal Championship
35.	27 April 2012	Bangkok, Thailand	Vietnam	9–4	won	3	2012 AFF Futsal Championship
36.	18 May 2012	Suphanburi, Thailand	Australia	4–3	won	2	Friendly
37.	20 May 2012	Bangkok, Thailand	Australia	4–2	won	2	Friendly
38.	26 May 2012	Dubai, United Arab Emirates	Turkmenistan	5–1	won	2	2012 AFC Futsal Championship
39.	27 May 2012	Dubai, United Arab Emirates	United Arab Emirates	4–2	won	1	2012 AFC Futsal Championship
40.	29 May 2012	Dubai, United Arab Emirates	Lebanon	5–3	won	1	2012 AFC Futsal Championship
41.	30 May 2012	Dubai, United Arab Emirates	Iran	5–4	won	3	2012 AFC Futsal Championship
42.	26 August 2012	Nakhon Ratchasima, Thailand	Spain	4–6	lost	3	Friendly
43.	22 October 2012	Bangkok, Thailand	Australia	4–5	lost	2	Friendly
44.	25 October 2012	Bangkok, Thailand	Panama	5–7	lost	2	Friendly
45.	1 November 2012	Bangkok, Thailand	Costa Rica	3–1	won	1	2012 FIFA Futsal World Cup
46.	4 November 2012	Bangkok, Thailand	Ukraine	3–5	lost	1	2012 FIFA Futsal World Cup
47.	7 November 2012	Bangkok, Thailand	Paraguay	2–3	lost	1	2012 FIFA Futsal World Cup
48.	30 May 2013	Bangkok, Thailand	Romania	9–4	won	3	Friendly
49.	1 June 2013	Bangkok, Thailand	Romania	7–3	won	3	Friendly
50.	26 June 2013	Incheon, South Korea	Bhutan	29–1	won	6	2013 Asian Indoor and Martial Arts Games
51.	3 July 2013	Incheon, South Korea	Lebanon	7–3	won	1	2013 Asian Indoor and Martial Arts Games
52.	4 June 2013	Incheon, South Korea	Iran	4–5	lost	1	2013 Asian Indoor and Martial Arts Games
53.	6 July 2013	Incheon, South Korea	Kuwait	9–6	won	1	2013 Asian Indoor and Martial Arts Games
54.	15 October 2013	Bangkok, Thailand	Laos	10–1	won	3	Friendly
55.	20 October 2013	Bangkok, Thailand	Philippines	20–1	won	6	2013 AFF Futsal Championship
56.	21 October 2013	Bangkok, Thailand	Brunei	8–1	won	1	2013 AFF Futsal Championship
57.	25 October 2013	Bangkok, Thailand	Indonesia	10–4	won	5	2013 AFF Futsal Championship
58.	27 October 2013	Bangkok, Thailand	Australia	2–1	won	2	2013 AFF Futsal Championship
59.	20 November 2013	Ho Chi Minh City, Vietnam	Brazil	1–5	lost	1	Friendly
60.	9 December 2013	Naypyidaw, Myanmar	Laos	12–3	won	4	2013 Southeast Asian Games
61.	15 December 2013	Naypyidaw, Myanmar	Vietnam	4–0	won	2	2013 Southeast Asian Games
62.	17 December 2013	Naypyidaw, Myanmar	Myanmar	8–1	won	2	2013 Southeast Asian Games
63.	20 December 2013	Naypyidaw, Myanmar	Vietnam	8–1	won	2	2013 Southeast Asian Games
64.	1 May 2014	Ho Chi Minh City, Vietnam	Malaysia	7–1	won	3	2014 AFC Futsal Championship
65.	3 May 2014	Ho Chi Minh City, Vietnam	Chinese Taipei	5–2	won	1	2014 AFC Futsal Championship
66.	5 May 2014	Ho Chi Minh City, Vietnam	Lebanon	3–3	drawn	2	2014 AFC Futsal Championship
67.	7 May 2014	Ho Chi Minh City, Vietnam	Japan	2–3	lost	1	2014 AFC Futsal Championship
68.	5 December 2014	Changshu, China	Myanmar	7–5	won	4	Friendly
69.	6 December 2014	Changshu, China	China	3–3	drawn	2	Friendly
70.	7 December 2014	Changshu, China	Mexico	7–0	won	3	Friendly
71.	26 September 2015	Samut Sakhon, Thailand	Bahrain	7–0	won	2	Friendly
72.	9 October 2015	Bangkok, Thailand	Singapore	8–0	won	1	2015 AFF Futsal Championship
73.	11 October 2015	Bangkok, Thailand	Brunei	12–2	won	3	2015 AFF Futsal Championship
74.	12 October 2015	Bangkok, Thailand	Timor-Leste	16–2	won	4	2015 AFF Futsal Championship
75.	14 October 2015	Bangkok, Thailand	Vietnam	6–0	won	3	2015 AFF Futsal Championship
76.	21 January 2016	Bangkok, Thailand	Jordan	9–0	won	2	Friendly
77.	11 February 2016	Tashkent, Uzbekistan	Tajikistan	5–4	won	3	2016 AFC Futsal Championship
78.	13 February 2016	Tashkent, Uzbekistan	Chinese Taipei	7–2	won	2	2016 AFC Futsal Championship
79.	15 February 2016	Tashkent, Uzbekistan	Vietnam	3–1	won	3	2016 AFC Futsal Championship
80.	17 February 2016	Tashkent, Uzbekistan	Australia	6–1	won	2	2016 AFC Futsal Championship
81.	21 February 2016	Tashkent, Uzbekistan	Vietnam	8–0	won	4	2016 AFC Futsal Championship
82.	20 August 2016	Bangkok, Thailand	Japan	2–2	drawn	1	Friendly
83.	21 August 2016	Bangkok, Thailand	Iran	7–5	won	3	Friendly
84.	23 August 2016	Bangkok, Thailand	Kazakhstan	3–3	drawn	1	Friendly
85.	10 September 2016	Medellín, Colombia	Russia	4–6	lost	1	2016 FIFA Futsal World Cup
86.	13 September 2016	Medellín, Colombia	Cuba	8–5	won	3	2016 FIFA Futsal World Cup
87.	22 September 2016	Medellín, Colombia	Azerbaijan	8–13	lost	2	2016 FIFA Futsal World Cup
88.	18 August 2017	Shah Alam, Malaysia	Vietnam	4–1	won	1	2017 Southeast Asian Games
89.	20 August 2017	Shah Alam, Malaysia	Indonesia	2–4	lost	1	2017 Southeast Asian Games
90.	27 August 2017	Shah Alam, Malaysia	Malaysia	4–3	won	2	2017 Southeast Asian Games
91.	9 September 2017	Bangkok, Thailand	Mozambique	6–3	won	1	Friendly
92.	19 September 2017	Ashgabat, Turkmenistan	Lebanon	5–2	won	1	2017 Asian Indoor and Martial Arts Games
93.	21 September 2017	Ashgabat, Turkmenistan	Japan	4–6	lost	1	2017 Asian Indoor and Martial Arts Games
94.	29 January 2018	Taipei, Taiwan	South Korea	6–1	won	1	Friendly
95.	4 February 2018	New Taipei City, Taiwan	Lebanon	2–5	lost	1	2018 AFC Futsal Championship
96.	6 February 2018	Taipei, Taiwan	Kyrgyzstan	8–1	won	3	2018 AFC Futsal Championship
97.	23 September 2019	Nagaoka, Japan	Japan	2–1	won	1	Friendly
98.	22 October 2019	Ho Chi Minh City, Vietnam	Timor-Leste	12–1	won	2	2019 AFF Futsal Championship
98.	23 October 2019	Ho Chi Minh City, Vietnam	Myanmar	9–0	won	1	2019 AFF Futsal Championship
99.	27 October 2019	Ho Chi Minh City, Vietnam	Indonesia	5–0	won	1	2019 AFF Futsal Championship
100.	11 December 2019	Nakhon Ratchasima, Thailand	Oman	11–0	won	1	Friendly
101.	15 December 2019	Nakhon Ratchasima, Thailand	Vietnam	3–1	won	1	Friendly
102.	2 February 2020	Hat Yai, Thailand	Malaysia	4–3	won	1	Friendly
103.	8 February 2020	Hat Yai, Thailand	Iran	2–1	won	1	Friendly
104.	26 July 2021	Bangkok, Thailand	Kosovo	6–6	drawn	2	Friendly
105.	27 July 2021	Bangkok, Thailand	Uzbekistan	4–3	won	2	Friendly
106.	29 July 2021	Bangkok, Thailand	Egypt	3–2	won	2	Friendly
107.	2 September 2021	Bangkok, Thailand	Oman	7–0	won	1	Friendly
108.	4 September 2021	Bangkok, Thailand	Chile	6–1	won	1	Friendly
109.	19 September 2021	Kaunas, Lithuania	Solomon Islands	9–4	won	3	2021 FIFA Futsal World Cup
110.	15 September 2022	Bangkok, Thailand	Iran	2–3	lose	1	Friendly
111.	27 March 2024	Nonthaburi, Thailand	Afghanistan	3–2	won	1	Friendly
112.	28 March 2024	Nonthaburi, Thailand	Australia	9–2	won	3	Friendly
113.	11 April 2024	Bangkok, Thailand	Japan	2–1	won	1	Friendly
114.	17 April 2024	Bangkok, Thailand	China	3–1	won	1	2024 AFC Futsal Asian Cup
115.	19 April 2024	Bangkok, Thailand	Myanmar	5–0	won	2	2024 AFC Futsal Asian Cup
116.	31 August 2024	Nonthaburi, Thailand	New Zealand	8–0	won	3	Friendly
117.	2 September 2024	Nonthaburi, Thailand	Kuwait	2–0	won	1	Friendly
118.	17 September 2024	Bukhara, Uzbekistan	Cuba	10–5	won	2	2024 FIFA Futsal World Cup
119.	27 September 2024	Bukhara, Uzbekistan	France	2–5	lost	1	2024 FIFA Futsal World Cup

== Royal decoration ==
- Commander (Third Class) of The Most Admirable Order of the Direkgunabhorn (2015)

Sporting positions
Preceded by (Japan) Rafael Henmi	Asian Futsaler of the Year; 2013	Succeeded by (Iran) Ali Asghar Hassanzadeh
Preceded by (Iran) Mohammad Keshavarz	AFC Futsal Club Championship MVP; 2013	Succeeded by (Japan) Kaoru Morioka
Preceded by (Iran) Hossein Tayyebi	AFC Futsal Championship Top Scorers; 2016 (14 Goals)	Succeeded by (Iran) Hossein Tayyebi
