= Al Wasl SC =

Emirati multi-sports club

Al Wasl Sports Club
- Full name: Al Wasl Club
- Founded: 1960; 66 years ago
- Ground: Zabeel Stadium; Dubai, United Arab Emirates
- Capacity: 8,439
- Chairman: pattern_la1=_blackshoulders
Home colours	Away colours

Al Wasl Sports Club (Arabic: نادي الوصل, romanized: al-waṣl, lit. 'United') is a multi-sports club in Dubai, the United Arab Emirates. It is best known for its football team.

== Current Board of Directors ==
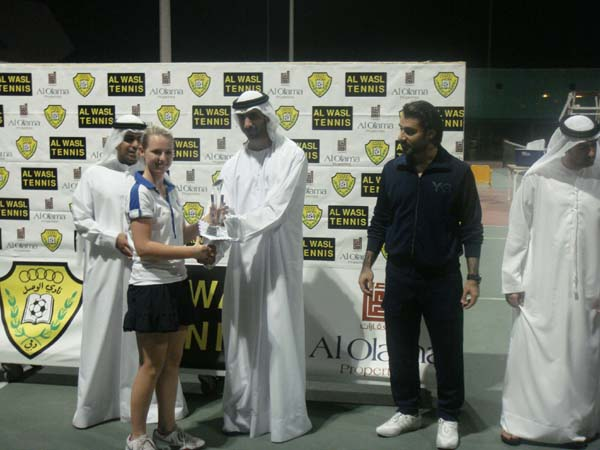
Al Wasl Cup prize distribution in 2009

Office	Name
Chairman of the Board	HE Rashid BelHoul AlMuhairi
Vice Chairman of the Board	Mohammed AlAmeri
Board Member	Sultan AbdulRahman Al Midfa
Board Member	Lt. Colonel Ahmed Mohammed Rafee
Board Member	Fahad Khamees
Board Member	Swaidan Saeed Juma Al Naboodah
Board Member	Mohammad Humaid Al Marri
Board Member	Nabil AbdulKarim
Board Member	Ali Burohaima
Board Member	Mohammad AbdulMajeed Al Mohairi

== See also ==
- Al Wasl FC — association football club
