= Rudimar Venâncio =

Brazilian futsal player

Xapa
Personal information
- Full name: Rudimar Venâncio
- Date of birth: 25 January 1984 (age 42)
- Place of birth: Lindóia do Sul, Santa Catarina, Brazil

Senior career*
Years	Team	Apps	(Gls)
2008–2011	FS Baix Maestrat		
2011–2013	Giti Pasand		(21)
2013–2015	Chonburi Bluewave		(21)
2015	Shahrdari Saveh		
2015–2019	Chonburi Bluewave		

International career
2010–	Brazil	70	(?)
- * Club domestic league appearances and goals as of 3 May 2021

Rudimar Venâncio (born 25 January 1984) commonly known as Xapa, is a Brazilian professional Futsal player.

== Club career ==
=== Chonburi Blue Wave ===
Thailand Futsal League

- Winners (4) 2012–2013,2014,2015,2016

Thai FA Cup

- Winners (1) 2015

AFC Futsal Club Championship

- Winners (2): 2013,2017

=== Giti Pasand ===
AFC Futsal Club Championship

- Winners (1): 2012
