= AFC Futsal Club Championship =

Futsal tournament for Asian clubs

- Organiser(s): AFC
- Founded: 2010; 16 years ago
- Region: Asia
- Current champions: (Japan) Nagoya Oceans (4th title)
- Most championships: (Japan) Nagoya Oceans (4 titles)
- Website: Official website

The AFC Futsal Club Championship is the current highest Asian futsal club competition, hosted by the Asian Football Confederation. It is futsal equivalent to AFC Champions League.

For the inaugural edition, AFC Futsal Committee decided to make it an invitational event, and each member association was asked to nominate their national league champions for the tournament.

== History and format ==
A trial edition, named 2006 Asia Futsal Cup, was run in 2006 with six teams participating. Iranian team Shensa Saveh beat Uzbek Ardus FC 5–1 in the final. The first recognised edition by the AFC was held in 2010 and ran with ten teams, forming two groups of five teams. The top two finishers then proceeded to the semi-finals. Since 2015 the final tournament is played with 12 teams. If more national league champions wish to enter a team, all but the top three finishers of the last tournament and the host nation, have to enter a qualification stage.

== Summaries ==
Edition	Year	Host	Final			Third place			Number of clubs
Edition	Year	Host	Winner	Score	Runner-up	Third place	Score	Fourth place	Number of clubs
1	2010; Details	(Iran); Isfahan	Foolad Mahan (Iran)	5–2	(Qatar) Al-Sadd	Nagoya Oceans (Japan)	6–6 aet (6–5) pen	(Thailand) Thai Port	10
2	2011; Details	(Qatar); Doha	Nagoya Oceans (Japan)	3–2 aet	(Iran) Shahid Mansouri	Al-Sadaka (Lebanon)	4–4 aet (4–3) pen	(Qatar) Al-Rayyan	8
3	2012; Details	Kuwait City	Giti Pasand (Iran)	2–1	(Uzbekistan) Ardus Tashkent	Nagoya Oceans (Japan)	4–1	(Qatar) Al-Rayyan	8
4	2013; Details	(Japan); Nagoya / Komaki	Chonburi Bluewave (Thailand)	1–1 aet (4–1) pen	(Iran) Giti Pasand	Nagoya Oceans (Japan)	6–4	(China) Shenzhen Nanling	8
5	2014; Details	(China); Chengdu	Nagoya Oceans (Japan)	5–4 aet	(Thailand) Chonburi Bluewave	Dabiri (Iran)	5–5 aet (7–6) pen	(China) Shenzhen Nanling	8
6	2015; Details	(Iran); Isfahan	Tasisat Daryaei (Iran)	5–4	(Kuwait) Al-Qadsia	Thái Sơn Nam (Vietnam)	7–3	(Iraq) Naft Al-Wasat	12
7	2016; Details	(Thailand); Bangkok	Nagoya Oceans (Japan)	4–4 aet (6–5) pen	(Iraq) Naft Al-Wasat	Chonburi Bluewave (Thailand)	6–1	(United Arab Emirates) Dibba Al-Hisn	12
8	2017; Details	(Vietnam); Ho Chi Minh City	Chonburi Bluewave (Thailand)	3–2	(Iran) Giti Pasand	Thái Sơn Nam (Vietnam)	6–1	(Qatar) Al Rayyan	14
9	2018; Details	(Indonesia); Yogyakarta	Mes Sungun (Iran)	4–2	(Vietnam) Thái Sơn Nam	Bank of Beirut (Lebanon)	5-3	(Iraq) Naft Al-Wasat	16
10	2019; Details	(Thailand); Bangkok	Nagoya Oceans (Japan)	2–0	(Iran) Mes Sungun	Thái Sơn Nam (Vietnam)	6–4	(Uzbekistan) AGMK	16
11	2023 Details

== Participating associations by debut ==
Year	New entry club(s)
2010	Australia, China, Iran, Iraq, Japan, Kyrgyzstan, Lebanon, Qatar, Thailand, Uzbekistan
2011	Indonesia
2012	Kuwait, Myanmar, United Arab Emirates, Vietnam
2013	Chinese Taipei, Philippines
2014–2016	None
2017	Tajikistan
2018	South Korea
2019	None
2020–2023	Afghanistan
2024	Jordan

== Statistics ==
=== Medals by nation ===
Rank	Nation	Gold	Silver	Bronze	Total
1	Iran	4	4	1	9
2	Japan	4	0	3	7
3	Thailand	2	1	1	4
4	Vietnam	0	1	3	4
5	Iraq	0	1	0	1
5	Kuwait	0	1	0	1
5	Qatar	0	1	0	1
5	Uzbekistan	0	1	0	1
9	Lebanon	0	0	2	2
Totals (9 entries)		10	10	10	30

=== Winners by club ===
Club	Winner	Runner-up	Years won	Years runner-up
(Japan) Nagoya Oceans	4	0	2011, 2014, 2016, 2019	
(Thailand) Chonburi Bluewave	2	1	2013, 2017	2014
(Iran) Giti Pasand	1	2	2012	2013, 2017
(Iran) Mes Sungun	1	1	2018	2019
(Iran) Foolad Mahan	1	0	2010	
(Iran) Tasisat Daryaei	1	0	2015	
(Qatar) Al-Sadd	0	1		2010
(Iran) Shahid Mansouri	0	1		2011
(Uzbekistan) Ardus Tashkent	0	1		2012
(Kuwait) Al-Qadsia	0	1		2015
(Iraq) Naft Al-Wasat	0	1		2016
(Vietnam) Thái Sơn Nam	0	1		2018

=== Performance by country ===
Rank	Country	Winners	Runners-up	Third place	Fourth place	Total
1	Iran	4	4	1	0	9
2	Japan	4	0	3	0	7
3	Thailand	2	1	1	1	5
4	Vietnam	0	1	3	0	4
5	Qatar	0	1	0	3	4
6	Iraq	0	1	0	2	3
7	Uzbekistan	0	1	0	1	2
8	Kuwait	0	1	0	0	1
9	Lebanon	0	0	2	0	2
10	China	0	0	0	2	2
11	United Arab Emirates	0	0	0	1	1
Total		10	10	10	10	40

== Awards ==
=== Most Valuable Player ===
Year	Footballer	Club
2010	(Iran) Vahid Shamsaei	(Iran) Foolad Mahan
2011	(Iran) Mohammad Keshavarz	(Iran) Shahid Mansouri
2012	(Iran) Mohammad Keshavarz	(Iran) Giti Pasand
2013	(Thailand) Suphawut Thueanklang	(Thailand) Chonburi Bluewave
2014	(Japan) Kaoru Morioka	(Japan) Nagoya Oceans
2015	(Iran) Vahid Shamsaei	(Iran) Tasisat Daryaei
2016	(Iran) Farhad Tavakoli	(Iraq) Naft Al-Wasat
2017	(Iran) Ali Asghar Hassanzadeh	(Iran) Giti Pasand
2018	(Iran) Mahdi Javid	(Lebanon) Bank of Beirut
2019	(Japan) Tomoki Yoshikawa	(Japan) Nagoya Oceans

=== Top scorer ===
Year	Player	Club	Goals
2010	(Iran) Vahid Shamsaei	(Iran) Foolad Mahan	17
2011	(Iran) Ali Asghar Hassanzadeh	(Qatar) Al Rayyan	10
2012	(Iran) Ahmad Esmaeilpour	(Iran) Giti Pasand	9
2013	(Japan) Kaoru Morioka	(Japan) Nagoya Oceans	8
2014	(Japan) Kaoru Morioka	(Japan) Nagoya Oceans	5
2015	(Iran) Vahid Shamsaei	(Iran) Tasisat Daryaei	10
2016	(Thailand) Jirawat Sornwichian	(Thailand) Chonburi Bluewave	7
2017	(Thailand) Jirawat Sornwichian	(Thailand) Chonburi Bluewave	9
2018	(Iran) Mahdi Javid	(Lebanon) Bank of Beirut	12
2019	(Japan) Kazuya Shimizu	(Vietnam) Thái Sơn Nam	10

=== AFC Fair Play Award ===
Year	Club
2010	(Iran) Foolad Mahan
2011	(Qatar) Al-Rayyan
2012	(Japan) Nagoya Oceans
2013	(China) Shenzhen Nanling
2014	(Japan) Nagoya Oceans
2015	(Vietnam) Thái Sơn Nam
2016	(United Arab Emirates) Dibba Al-Hisn
2017	(Vietnam) Thái Sơn Nam
2018	(Iraq) Naft Al-Wasat
2019	(Iran) Mes Sungun

== See also ==
- AFC Futsal Asian Cup
- AFF Futsal Club Championship
