= Nagoya Oceans =

Japanese futsal club

Nagoya Oceans 名古屋オーシャンズ
- Full name: Nagoya Oceans Futsal Club
- Founded: 2006; 20 years ago
- Ground: Takeda Teva Ocean Arena; Nagoya, Aichi
- Capacity: 2,569
- Head coach: Juan Francisco Fuentes
- League: F. League
- 2022–23: 1st of 12, Champions
Home colours	Away colours

Nagoya Oceans (名古屋オーシャンズ, Nagoya Ōshanzu) are a Japanese professional futsal club, currently playing in the F. League Division 1. The team is located in Nagoya, Aichi Prefecture, Japan. Their home ground is Takeda Teva Ocean Arena.

== Season-by-season ==
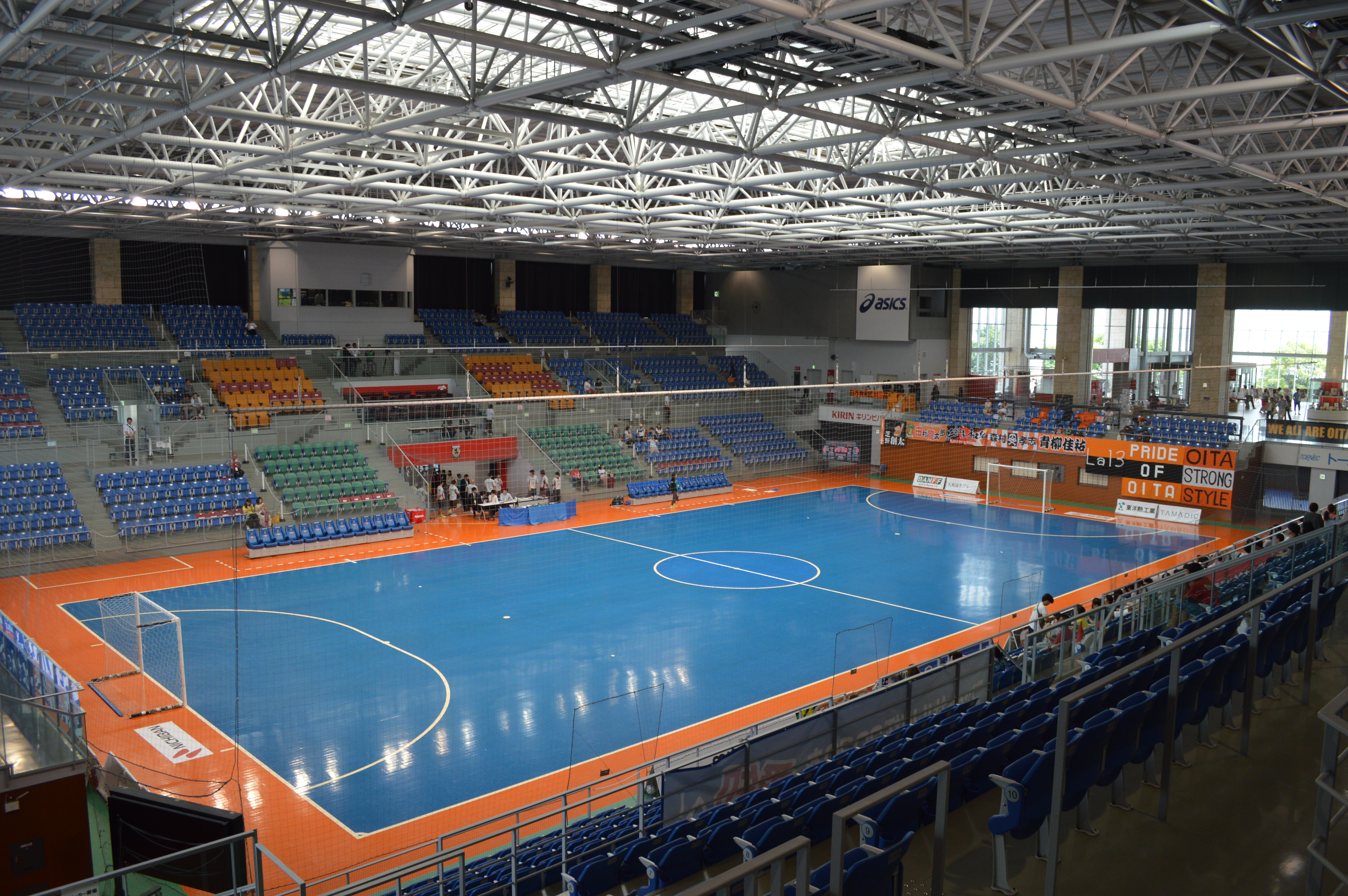
Takeda Teva Ocean Arena

Season	League	League Place		AFC Futsal Club Championship
Season	League	Regular season	Play-off	AFC Futsal Club Championship
2007-08	F. League	1st	none	
2008-09	F. League	1st	none	
2009-10	F. League	1st	none	
2010-11	F. League	1st	none	3rd place
2011-12	F. League	1st	none	Champion
2012-13	F. League	1st	Champion	3rd place
2013-14	F. League	1st	Champion	3rd place
2014-15	F. League	1st	Champion	Champion
2015-16	F. League	1st	Champion	Quarterfinal
2016-17	F. League	2nd	2nd stage	Champion
2017-18	F. League	1st	Champion	
2018-19	F. League	1st	Champion	Quarterfinal
2019-20	F. League	1st	Champion	Champion
2020-21	F. League	1st	Champion	
2021-22	F. League	1st	Champion	
2022-23	F. League	1st	Champion	
2023-24	F. League	1st	Champion	
2024-25	F. League			

== Sponsor ==
=== Technical sponsor ===
- 2007–2008 Topper
- 2009–2016 Asics
- 2016– Hummel

=== Official sponsor ===
- 2007-oggi Taiyo Yakuhin Co. Ltd.
- 2007-oggi Kajima Corporation
- 2010-oggi Toho Gas
- 2011–2013 Emirates
- 2011-present Kajima Corporation, Teva Pharma Japan Inc., AirAsia

== Trophies ==
- AFC Futsal Club Championship: 4
  - Winners: 2011, 2014, 2016, 2019
- F.League: 15
  - Winners: 2007–08, 2008–09, 2009–10, 2010–11, 2011–12, 2012–13, 2013–14, 2014–15, 2015–16, 2017–18, 2018–19, 2019–20, 2020–21, 2021–22, 2022–23
- All Japan Futsal Championship: 6
  - Winners: 2007, 2013, 2014, 2015, 2018, 2019
- F.League Ocean Cup: 9
  - Winners: 2010, 2011, 2012, 2013, 2014, 2017, 2018, 2019, 2022

== Current players ==
As of 22 September 2022

Note: Flags indicate national team as defined under FIFA eligibility rules; some limited exceptions apply. Players may hold more than one non-FIFA nationality.

No.	Pos.	Nation	Player
1	GK	JPN	Ryuma Shinoda
3	FP	JPN	Shokei Onizuka
4	FP	JPN	Soma Mizutani
6	FP	JPN	Oliveira Arthur
7	FP	JPN	Ryohei Ando
8	FP	ESP	Andresito
9	FP	JPN	Neto Massanori
13	FP	BRA	Darlan

No.	Pos.	Nation	Player
14	FP	JPN	Ryosuke Nishitani
15	FP	JPN	Tomoki Yoshikawa
17	FP	JPN	Kiyoto Yagi
21	GK	JPN	Hiroshi Tabuchi
32	FP	JPN	Yasuo Miyagawa
77	FP	BRA	Gabriel Penézio

== Coaches ==
- 2006-2007 (Brazil) Oscar Majikina
- 2007-2008 (Brazil) Mario Tateyama
- 2008-2013 (Portugal) Jose Ajiu Amarante
- 2013-2016 (Spain) Víctor Acosta García
- 2016-2019 (Portugal) Pedro Costa
- 2019- (Spain) Juan Francisco Fuentes Zamora

== Notable former players ==
- 2007-2008 (Japan) Ricardo Higa
- 2007-2016 (Japan) Wataru Kitahara
- 2007-2016 (Japan) Kaoru Morioka
- 2009-2012 (Japan) Kenichiro Kogure
- 2009-2014 (Japan) Hisamitsu Kawahara
- 2010-2013 (Portugal) Ricardinho
- 2011-2012 (Brazil) Marquinho
- 2011-2016 (Portugal) Pedro Costa
- 2012-2013 (Japan) Rafael Henmi
- 2012-2017 (Japan) Matías Hernán Mayedonchi
- 2012- (Japan) Tomoki Yoshikawa
- 2018- (Japan) Shota Hoshi 2020-2022 Suphawut Thueanklang

Achievements
Preceded by Foolad Mahan FSC (Iran)	AFC Futsal Club Championship; 2011 (First title)	Succeeded by Giti Pasand Isfahan (Iran)
Preceded by Chonburi Blue Wave Futsal Club (Thailand)	AFC Futsal Club Championship; 2014 (Second title)	Succeeded by Tasisat Daryaei (Iran)
Preceded by Tasisat Daryaei (Iran)	AFC Futsal Club Championship; 2016 (Third title)	Succeeded by Chonburi Blue Wave Futsal Club (Thailand)
Preceded by Mes Sungun (Iran)	AFC Futsal Club Championship; 2019 (Fourth title)	Succeeded by Incumbent
