= 2015 AFF Futsal Club Championship =

Tournament details
- Host country: Thailand
- City: Bangkok
- Dates: 23–29 November
- Teams: 10 (from 1 confederation)
- Venue: (in Bangkok host cities)

Final positions
- Champions: (Thailand) Thai Port (men) (Vietnam) Thai Son Nam (women)

2015 AFF Futsal Club Championship was the first edition of AFF Futsal Club Championship. The tournament was held in Bangkok, Thailand from 23 to 29 November. The Futsal clubs from AFF member countries were invited to compete in the tournament.

== Participants ==
=== Group A (Men’s) ===
- (Thailand) Thai Port
- (Malaysia) Felda United
- (Myanmar) MIC
- (Australia) East Coast Heat
- (Vietnam) Sanna Khanh Hoa

=== Group B (Women's) ===
- (Thailand) BG-College of Asian Scholars
- (Malaysia) Felda United
- (Myanmar) MIC
- (Australia) Dural Warriors
- (Vietnam) Thai Son Nam

== Venue ==
Bangkok
Bangkok Arena	Location of stadiums of the 2015 AFF Futsal Club Championship.
Capacity: 12,000	Location of stadiums of the 2015 AFF Futsal Club Championship.

== Group stage ==
=== Group A (Men’s) ===
Team	Pld	W	D	L	GF	GA	GD	Pts	Qualification
(Thailand) Thai Port	4	3	1	0	11	5	+6	10	Qualification to final match
(Malaysia) Felda United	4	2	1	1	12	8	+4	7	Qualification to final match
(Australia) East Coast Heat	4	1	1	2	7	9	−2	4	Qualification to third place match
(Myanmar) MIC	4	0	3	1	4	8	−4	3	Qualification to third place match
(Vietnam) Sanna Khanh Hoa	4	0	2	2	5	9	−4	2	

23 November 2015
14:00 UTC+7:00

East Coast Heat (Australia)	1 – 4	(Malaysia) Felda United
	Report

Bangkok Arena, Thailand
Referee: Mohd Nawawi A. Rahman (Malaysia)
23 November 2015
16:30 UTC+7:00

Sanna Khanh Hoa (Vietnam)	1 – 1	(Myanmar) MIC
	Report

Bangkok Arena, Thailand
Referee: Khampasong Xayavongsy (Laos)
24 November 2015
14:00 UTC+7:00

Sanna Khanh Hoa (Vietnam)	1 – 3	(Australia) East Coast Heat
	Report

Bangkok Arena, Thailand
Referee: Tiha Kyaw (Myanmar)
24 November 2015
19:00 UTC+7:00

MIC (Myanmar)	0 – 4	(Thailand) Thai Port
	Report

Bangkok Arena, Thailand
Referee: Mohd Kamir Yusof (Malaysia)
25 November 2015
14:00 UTC+7:00

Felda United (Malaysia)	4 – 2	(Vietnam) Sanna Khanh Hoa
	Report

Bangkok Arena, Thailand
Referee: Sopheak Saing (Cambodia)
25 November 2015
19:00 UTC+7:00

Thai Port (Thailand)	3 – 2	(Australia) East Coast Heat
	Report

Bangkok Arena, Thailand
Referee: Khampasong Xayavongsy (Laos)
26 November 2015
14:00 UTC+7:00

Felda United (Malaysia)	2 – 2	(Myanmar) MIC
	Report

Bangkok Arena, Thailand
Attendance: Sukry Matassim (Brunei)
26 November 2015
19:00 UTC+7:00

Sanna Khanh Hoa (Vietnam)	1 – 1	(Thailand) Thai Port
	Report

Bangkok Arena, Thailand
Referee: Mohd Kamir Yusof (Malaysia)
27 November 2015
14:00 UTC+7:00

East Coast Heat (Australia)	1 – 1	(Myanmar) MIC
	Report

Bangkok Arena, Thailand
27 November 2015
19:00 UTC+7:00

Thai Port (Thailand)	3 – 2	(Malaysia) Felda United
	Report

Bangkok Arena, Thailand

=== Third place match ===
29 November 2015
14:00 UTC+7:00

East Coast Heat (Australia)	2 – 4	(Myanmar) MIC
	Report

Bangkok Arena, Thailand
Referee: Apinan Damkilang (Thailand)

=== Final ===
29 November 2015
19:00 UTC+7:00

Thai Port (Thailand)	5 – 0	(Malaysia) Felda United
	Report

Bangkok Arena, Thailand
Referee: Sopheak Saing (Cambodia)

==== Winner ====
AFF Futsal Club Championship
2015 Men's Club Champions
(Thailand)
Thai Port
First title

=== Group B (Women's) ===
Team	Pld	W	D	L	GF	GA	GD	Pts	Qualification
(Vietnam) Thai Son Nam	4	3	1	0	16	3	+13	10	Qualification to final match
(Australia) Dural Warriors	4	3	0	1	5	2	+3	9	Qualification to final match
(Thailand) Asian Scholars	4	2	1	1	12	5	+7	7	Qualification to third place match
(Malaysia) Felda United	4	1	0	3	5	13	−8	3	Qualification to third place match
(Myanmar) MIC	4	0	0	4	1	14	−13	0	

23 November 2015
11:30 UTC+7:00

Dural Warriors (Australia)	3 – 0	(Myanmar) MIC
	Report

Bangkok Arena, Thailand
Referee: Mohd Nawawi A. Rahman (Malaysia)
23 November 2015
16:30 UTC+7:00

Thai Son Nam (Vietnam)	8 – 0	(Malaysia) Felda United
	Report

Bangkok Arena, Thailand
Referee: Sukry Matassim (Brunei)
24 November 2015
11:30 UTC+7:00

Thai Son Nam (Vietnam)	1 – 0	(Australia) Dural Warriors
	Report

Bangkok Arena, Thailand
Referee: Apinan Damkilang (Thailand)
24 November 2015
16:30 UTC+7:00

Felda United (Malaysia)	0 – 4	(Thailand) Asian Scholars
	Report

Bangkok Arena, Thailand
Referee: Jamilah Binti Zulkefle
25 November 2015
11:30 UTC+7:00

MIC (Myanmar)	0 - 4	(Vietnam) Thai Son Nam
	Report

Bangkok Arena, Thailand
Referee: Mohd Nawawi A. Rahman (Malaysia)
25 November 2015
16:30 UTC+7:00

Asian Scholars (Thailand)	1 – 2	(Australia) Dural Warriors
	Report

Bangkok Arena, Thailand
Attendance: Sukry Matassim (Brunei)
26 November 2015
11:30 UTC+7:00

Felda United (Malaysia)	3 – 1	(Myanmar) MIC
	Report

Bangkok Arena, Thailand
Referee: Khampasong Xayavongsy (Laos)
26 November 2015
16:30 UTC+7:00

Thai Son Nam (Vietnam)	3 – 3	(Thailand) Asian Scholars
	Report

Bangkok Arena, Thailand
Referee: Emmanuel Elloso (Philippines)
27 November 2015
11:30 UTC+7:00

Dural Warriors (Australia)	2 – 0	(Malaysia) Felda United
	Report

Bangkok Arena, Thailand
Referee: Khampasong Xayavongsy (Laos)
27 November 2015
16:30 UTC+7:00

Asian Scholars (Thailand)	4 – 0	(Myanmar) MIC
	Report

Bangkok Arena, Thailand

=== Third place match ===
29 November 2015
11:30 UTC+7:00

Asian Scholars (Thailand)	4 – 3	(Malaysia) Felda United
	Report

Bangkok Arena, Thailand
Referee: Emmanuel Elloso (Philippines)

=== Final ===
29 November 2015
16:30 UTC+7:00

Thai Son Nam (Vietnam)	3 – 1	(Australia) Dural Warriors
	Report

Bangkok Arena, Thailand
Referee: Sukry Matassim (Brunei)

==== Winner ====
AFF Futsal Club Championship
2015 Women's Club Champions
(Vietnam)
Thai Son Nam
First title
