= 2018 AFF Futsal Club Championship =

Tournament details
- Host country: Indonesia
- City: Yogyakarta
- Dates: 15–21 July
- Teams: 8 (from 1 sub-confederation)
- Venue: 1 (in 1 host city)

Final positions
- Champions: (Thailand) Bangkok BTS

Tournament statistics
- Matches played: 12
- Goals scored: 95 (7.92 per match)

2018 AFF Invitational Futsal Club Championship was the fourth edition of AFF Futsal Club Championship. The tournament was held in Yogyakarta, Indonesia from 15 to 21 July 2018. The defending champion was Thai Port.

== Participants ==
=== Group A ===
Association	Team
Australia	East Coast Heat
Brunei	Arbisyam
Myanmar	MIC
Cambodia	U.Y.F.C Komchaymear

=== Group B ===
Association	Team
Thailand	Bangkok BTS FC
Vietnam	Sanatech Khanh Hoa
Malaysia	Melaka United
Indonesia	SKN FC Kebumen

== Group stage ==
All times are local, WIB (UTC+7).

=== Group A ===
Pos	Team	Pld	W	D	L	GF	GA	GD	Pts	Qualification
1	(Australia) East Coast Heat	3	2	1	0	20	2	+18	7	Knockout stage
2	(Myanmar) MIC	3	2	1	0	15	4	+11	7	Knockout stage
3	(Brunei) Arbisyam	3	1	0	2	7	25	−18	3	
4	(Cambodia) U.Y.F.C Komchaymear	3	0	0	3	8	19	−11	0	

Source: AFF
15 July 2018
11:30

Arbisyam (Brunei)	0 : 9	(Myanmar) MIC

GOR UNY, Yogyakarta
15 July 2018
16:00

East Coast Heat (Australia)	8 : 0	(Cambodia) U.Y.F.C Komchaymear

GOR UNY, Yogyakarta
16 July 2018
11:30

U.Y.F.C Komchaymear (Cambodia)	2 : 4	(Myanmar) MIC

GOR UNY, Yogyakarta
16 July 2018
16:00

East Coast Heat (Australia)	10 : 0	(Brunei) Arbisyam

GOR UNY, Yogyakarta
17 July 2018
11:30

Arbisyam (Brunei)	7 : 6	(Cambodia) U.Y.F.C Komchaymear

GOR UNY, Yogyakarta
17 July 2018
16:00

East Coast Heat (Australia)	2 : 2	(Myanmar) MIC

GOR UNY, Yogyakarta

=== Group B ===
Pos	Team	Pld	W	D	L	GF	GA	GD	Pts	Qualification
1	(Thailand) Bangkok BTS FC	3	2	1	0	12	6	+6	7	Knockout stage
2	(Indonesia) SKN FC Kebumen (H)	3	1	2	0	16	9	+7	5	Knockout stage
3	(Vietnam) Sanatech Khanh Hoa	3	1	0	2	10	14	−4	3	
4	(Malaysia) Melaka United	3	0	1	2	7	16	−9	1	

Source: AFF
(H) Hosts
15 July 2018
14:00

Melaka United (Malaysia)	3 : 3	(Indonesia) SKN FC Kebumen

GOR UNY, Yogyakarta
15 July 2018
18:00

Bangkok BTS FC (Thailand)	2 : 1	(Vietnam) Sanatech Khanh Hoa

GOR UNY, Yogyakarta
16 July 2018
14:00

Bangkok BTS FC (Thailand)	4 : 4	(Indonesia) SKN FC Kebumen

GOR UNY, Yogyakarta
16 July 2018
18:00

Melaka United (Malaysia)	3 : 7	(Vietnam) Sanatech Khanh Hoa

GOR UNY, Yogyakarta
17 July 2018
14:00

Sanatech Khanh Hoa (Vietnam)	2 : 9	(Indonesia) SKN FC Kebumen

GOR UNY, Yogyakarta
17 July 2018
18:00

Melaka United (Malaysia)	1 : 6	(Thailand) Bangkok BTS FC

GOR UNY, Yogyakarta

== Knockout stage ==
=== Bracket ===
Semi-finals
East Coast Heat	6
SKN FC Kebumen	4
Bangkok BTS FC	3
MIC	1

Final
East Coast Heat	1
Bangkok BTS FC	7
Third place
MIC (p)	3(11)
SKN FC Kebumen	3(10)

=== Semi-finals ===
19 July 2018
11:00

Bangkok BTS FC (Thailand)	3 : 1	(Myanmar) MIC

GOR UNY, Yogyakarta
19 July 2018
14:00

SKN FC Kebumen (Indonesia)	4 : 6	(Australia) East Coast Heat

GOR UNY, Yogyakarta

=== Third-place match ===
21 July 2018
11:00

MIC (Myanmar)	3 : 3	(Indonesia) SKN FC Kebumen
Penalties
	11 : 10

GOR UNY, Yogyakarta

=== Final ===
21 July 2018
14:00

(Australia) East Coast Heat	1 : 7	(Thailand) Bangkok BTS FC

GOR UNY, Yogyakarta

== Winner ==
2018 AFF Futsal Club Championship Champion
(Thailand)
Bangkok BTS
First title

== Final ranking ==
Rank	Team
1st place, gold medalist(s)	(Thailand) Bangkok BTS
2nd place, silver medalist(s)	(Australia) East Coast Heat
3rd place, bronze medalist(s)	(Myanmar) MIU
4	(Indonesia) SKN FC Kebumen
5	(Vietnam) SS Khanh Hoa
6	(Brunei) Arbisyam
7	(Malaysia) Melaka United
8	(Cambodia) U.Y.F.C.Komchaymear
