= MIU =

Miu or MIU may refer to:

== People and culture ==
- Miu (given name)
- Miu (Naga festival)
- Miu language, an Austronesian language spoken in Papua New Guinea
- Ion Miu (born 1955), Romanian virtuoso cimbalom player

== Universities ==
- Al-Mustafa International University, in Qom, Iran
- Maharishi International University, formerly known as Maharishi University of Management
- Manarat International University, in Dhaka, Bangladesh
- Manipal International University, in Malaysia
- Manipur International University, located in Manipur, India
- Marconi International University, Florida; part of Marconi University
- Miami International University of Art & Design, Florida
- Misr International University, an Egyptian private university, Cairo
- Miyazaki International University, private university in Miyazaki prefecture, Japan.
- Mongolia International University, in Ulaanbaatar, Mongolia
- Myanmar Imperial University, in Yangon, Myanmar

== Other ==
- M.I.U. Album, by the Beach Boys
- Main instrument unit
- Minor injuries unit
- Mobile incinerator unit, a plant for Waste treatment
- Movement for Integration and Unification, an Albanian radical left-wing nationalist movement in Kosovo
- mIU is milli-IU, a thousandth of an international unit
- MU puzzle, also known as the MIU game
