= 2024 AFC Futsal Asian Cup =

International futsal competition

ฟุตซอลเอเชียนคัพ 2024

Tournament details
- Host country: Thailand
- Dates: 17–28 April
- Teams: 16 (from 1 confederation)
- Venues: 2 (in 1 host city)

Final positions
- Champions: Iran (13th title)
- Runners-up: Thailand
- Third place: Uzbekistan
- Fourth place: Tajikistan

Tournament statistics
- Matches played: 35
- Goals scored: 177 (5.06 per match)
- Top scorer(s): (Iran) Saeid Ahmadabbasi (8 goals)
- Best player: (Iran) Saeid Ahmadabbasi
- Best goalkeeper: (Iran) Bagher Mohammadi
- Fair play award: Thailand

The 2024 AFC Futsal Asian Cup was the 17th edition of the AFC Futsal Asian Cup, the biennial international futsal championship organised by the Asian Football Confederation (AFC) for the men's national teams of Asia. The tournament was held in Thailand between 17 and 28 April.

A total of 16 teams competed in the tournament. Japan, the defending champions, were eliminated in the group stage for the first time. Iran claimed their thirteenth Futsal Asian Cup after winning the final against the host Thailand 4–1. Uzbekistan defeated Tajikistan 3–1 on penalties following a 5–5 draw in the third place play-off.

Semi-finalists including Iran, Tajikistan and Thailand qualified for the 2024 FIFA Futsal World Cup besides Uzbekistan who automatically qualified as host. As Uzbekistan reached the semi-finals, a play-off round was held to determine the last Asian spot at the Futsal World Cup. Afghanistan won the play-off round.

Many accomplishments were achieved at the tournament. Afghanistan made their debut and also advanced to the quarter-finals. In the group stage, Myanmar gained their first win, while South Korea gained their first point in 14 years. Tajikistan made their first appearance in the semi-finals, while Thailand reached the final for the first time in 12 years. All five teams from Central Asia advanced to the quarter-finals, with three of them reaching the semi-finals.

== Host selection ==
India and Thailand expressed interest to host the tournament. Later, Thailand was selected as hosts by the AFC Futsal and Beach Soccer Committee on 5 September 2023.

== Teams ==
The draw for the qualifiers was held on 22 June 2023. The host Thailand qualified directly for the final tournament, while the other teams competed in the qualifying stage for the remaining 15 spots. The qualifiers were played between 7 and 13 October 2023.

=== Qualified teams ===
Of the 16 teams appearing, 11 teams were returning after appearing in the 2022 edition.

Afghanistan were the only debutant in the competition, while Australia marked their return for the first time in 8 years. China, Kyrgyzstan and Myanmar also qualified for the first time in 6 years. Iran, Japan, Thailand and Uzbekistan were the only four teams to qualify for every edition.

Three nations from the previous edition failed to qualify (Chinese Taipei, Indonesia and Lebanon) and other two nations from the previous edition did not enter to qualifiers (Oman and Turkmenistan).

Team	Method of qualification	Date of qualification	Finals appearances	Last appearance	Previous best performance
Thailand	Hosts	5 September 2023	17th	2022	Runners-up (2008, 2012)
China	Group A winners	13 October 2023	13th	2018	Fourth place (2008, 2010)
Afghanistan	Group B winners	11 October 2023	1st	Debut	None
Saudi Arabia	Group B runners-up	11 October 2023	3rd	2022	Group stage (2016, 2022)
Iran	Group C winners	11 October 2023	17th	2022	Champions (1999, 2000, 2001, 2002, 2003, 2004, 2005, 2007, 2008, 2010, 2016, 2018)
Kyrgyzstan	Group C runners-up	11 October 2023	16th	2018	Fourth place (2006, 2007), Semi-finals (2005)
Vietnam	Group D winners	9 October 2023	7th	2022	Fourth place (2016)
South Korea	Group D runners-up	9 October 2023	15th	2022	Runners-up (1999)
Tajikistan	Group E winners	9 October 2023	12th	2022	Quarter-finals (2007, 2022)
Myanmar	Group E runners-up	9 October 2023	2nd	2018	Group stage (2018)
Kuwait	Group F winners	9 October 2023	13th	2022	Fourth place (2003, 2014)
Bahrain	Group F runners-up	9 October 2023	4th	2022	Quarter-finals (2018)
Uzbekistan	Group G winners	9 October 2023	17th	2022	Runners-up (2001, 2006, 2010, 2016)
Iraq	Group G runners-up	9 October 2023	13th	2022	Fourth place (2018)
Japan	Group H winners	11 October 2023	17th	2022	Champions (2006, 2012, 2014, 2022)
Australia	Group H runners-up	11 October 2023	8th	2016	Fourth place (2012)

=== Draw ===
The draw was held on 14 December 2023 at the AFC House in Kuala Lumpur, Malaysia.

The 16 teams were drawn into four groups of four teams, with seeding based on their performance at the qualification and the final of the previous edition. Seeding was shown in parentheses except the team who previously did not participate, which were denoted by (–).

The host Thailand automatically seeded to Pot 1 and placed into the first position of Group A.

Pot 1	Pot 2	Pot 3	Pot 4
Thailand (4) (hosts); Japan (1); Iran (2); Uzbekistan (3)	Tajikistan (5); Kuwait (7); Vietnam (8); Saudi Arabia (9)	Iraq (10); Bahrain (11); South Korea (15); Myanmar (16)	Afghanistan (17); Kyrgyzstan (18); Australia (20); China (–)

== Venues ==
The tournament was held at two venues in Bangkok.

Bangkok
Bangkok Arena	Indoor Stadium Huamark
Capacity: 12,000	Capacity: 8,000

== Squads ==
Each team was required to registered a squad with a minimum of 14 players and a maximum of 25 players, at least two of whom had to be goalkeepers (Regulations Article 23).

== Group stage ==
=== Tiebreakers ===
Teams were ranked according to points (3 points for a win, 1 point for a draw, 0 points for a loss), and if tied on points, the following tiebreaking criteria were applied, in the order given, to determine the rankings (Regulations Article 7.3):

1. Points in head-to-head matches among tied teams;
2. Goal difference in head-to-head matches among tied teams;
3. Goals scored in head-to-head matches among tied teams;
4. If more than two teams were tied, and after applying all head-to-head criteria above, a subset of teams were still tied, all head-to-head criteria above were reapplied exclusively to this subset of teams;
5. Goal difference in all group matches;
6. Goals scored in all group matches;
7. Penalty shoot-out if only two teams were tied and they met in the last round of the group;
8. Disciplinary points (yellow card = 1 point, red card as a result of two yellow cards = 3 points, direct red card = 3 points, yellow card followed by direct red card = 4 points);
9. Drawing of lots.

=== Group A ===
Pos	Team	Pld	W	D	L	GF	GA	GD	Pts	Qualification
1	Thailand (H)	3	3	0	0	10	2	+8	9	Advance to the knockout stage
2	Vietnam	3	1	1	1	3	3	0	4	Advance to the knockout stage
3	Myanmar	3	1	1	1	4	7	−3	4	
4	China	3	0	0	3	2	7	−5	0	

Source: AFC
Rules for classification: Group stage tiebreakers
(H) Hosts
17 April 2024
14:00

Vietnam	1–1	Myanmar
Đào Minh Quảng 23'20"	Report	Ko Ko Lwin 28'31"

Indoor Stadium Huamark, Bangkok
Referee: Ebrahim Mehrabi Afshar (Iran)
17 April 2024
18:00

Thailand	3–1	China
Apiwat 12'00"; Suphawut 12'42"; Muhammad 15'12"	Report	Xu Yang 39'49"

Indoor Stadium Huamark, Bangkok
Referee: Hiroyuki Kobayashi (Japan)

19 April 2024
14:00

China	0–1	Vietnam
	Report	Nhan Gia Hưng 10'51" (pen.)

Indoor Stadium Huamark, Bangkok
Referee: Gelareh Nazemi Deylami (Iran)
19 April 2024
18:00

Myanmar	0–5	Thailand
	Report	Itticha 7'42"; Suphawut 20'47", 37'56" (pen.); Muhammad 29'25"; Panat 35'00"

Indoor Stadium Huamark, Bangkok
Referee: Nikita Afinogenov (Uzbekistan)

21 April 2024
18:00

Thailand	2–1	Vietnam
Muhammad 11'28"; Worasak 29'08"	Report	Từ Minh Quang 20'29"

Indoor Stadium Huamark, Bangkok
Referee: Eisa Abdul Houssain (Kuwait)
21 April 2024
18:00

Myanmar	3–1	China
Hlaing Min Tun 15'57"; Shen Siming 16'57" (o.g.); Ko Ko Lwin 33'53"	Report	Yakepujiang Maimaiti 9'34"

Bangkok Arena, Bangkok
Referee: Wahyu Wicaksono (Indonesia)

=== Group B ===
Pos	Team	Pld	W	D	L	GF	GA	GD	Pts	Qualification
1	Uzbekistan	3	3	0	0	10	4	+6	9	Advance to the knockout stage
2	Iraq	3	2	0	1	12	7	+5	6	Advance to the knockout stage
3	Saudi Arabia	3	1	0	2	6	10	−4	3	
4	Australia	3	0	0	3	6	13	−7	0	

Source: AFC
Rules for classification: Group stage tiebreakers
17 April 2024
16:00

Uzbekistan	3–2	Australia
Usmonov 20'39"; Rakhmatov 20'58", 35'30"	Report	Giovenali 4'59"; Garner 37'18"

Bangkok Arena, Bangkok
Referee: Eisa Abdul Houssain (Kuwait)
17 April 2024
21:00

Saudi Arabia	1–5	Iraq
Al-Otaibi 10'31"	Report	Al-Husaynat 0'51"; Al-Bayati 4'24"; Al-Taie 6'11"; Al-Ogaili 23'30"; Tareq 31'27"

Bangkok Arena, Bangkok
Referee: Pornnarong Grairod (Thailand)

19 April 2024
16:00

Australia	2–4	Saudi Arabia
De Melo 22'47"; Dib 28'57"	Report	Aroan 22'16", 25'16"; Al-Maleh 30'13"; Al-Maghrabi 39'39"

Bangkok Arena, Bangkok
Referee: An Ran (China)
19 April 2024
21:00

Iraq	1–4	Uzbekistan
Al-Ogaili 37'12"	Report	Usmonov 10'08"; Adilov 15'24"; Tulkinov 25'24"; Juraev 27'52"

Bangkok Arena, Bangkok
Referee: Husain Al-Bahhar (Bahrain)

21 April 2024
21:00

Uzbekistan	3–1	Saudi Arabia
Adilov 24'40"; Akhmetzyanov 31'05"; Elmurodov 38'57"	Report	Mohamed 2'08"

Bangkok Arena, Bangkok
Referee: Fahad Al-Hosani (United Arab Emirates)
21 April 2024
21:00

Iraq	6–2	Australia
Al-Husaynat 13'30"; Tareq 29'57", 32'21"; Al-Obaidi 30'22", 33'44"; Al-Bayati 35'44"	Report	Kouta 12'52"; Adeli 13'15"

Indoor Stadium Huamark, Bangkok
Referee: Ebrahim Mehrabi Afshar (Iran)

=== Group C ===
Pos	Team	Pld	W	D	L	GF	GA	GD	Pts	Qualification
1	Tajikistan	3	1	2	0	5	3	+2	5	Advance to the knockout stage
2	Kyrgyzstan	3	1	2	0	10	9	+1	5	Advance to the knockout stage
3	Japan	3	1	1	1	8	4	+4	4	
4	South Korea	3	0	1	2	5	12	−7	1	

Source: AFC
Rules for classification: Group stage tiebreakers
18 April 2024
14:00

Tajikistan	2–0	South Korea
Aliev 5'02"; Sardorov 8'19"	Report

Bangkok Arena, Bangkok
Referee: Hassan Al-Gburi (Iraq)
18 April 2024
18:00

Japan	2–3	Kyrgyzstan
Arai 37'34"; Tsutsumi 38'16"	Report	Dzhanat uulu 12'24"; Alimov 20'34"; Kubanychov 30'40"

Bangkok Arena, Bangkok
Referee: Andrew Best (Australia)

20 April 2024
14:00

Kyrgyzstan	2–2	Tajikistan
Makhmadaminov 36'25"; Alimov 39'49"	Report	Khojaev 9'00"; Aliev 29'23"

Bangkok Arena, Bangkok
Referee: Abdulaziz Al-Sarraf (Kuwait)
20 April 2024
18:00

South Korea	0–5	Japan
	Report	Arai 4'12", 22'30"; Hirata 8'51" (pen.), 18'31" (pen.); Nibuya 34'50"

Bangkok Arena, Bangkok
Referee: Zari Fathi (Iran)

22 April 2024
18:00

Japan	1–1	Tajikistan
Ishida 11'05"	Report	Sharipov 25'38"

Bangkok Arena, Bangkok
Referee: Trương Quốc Dũng (Vietnam)
22 April 2024
18:00

South Korea	5–5	Kyrgyzstan
Lim Seung-ju 6'46"; Lee Han-wool 10'25"; Kim Seung-hyun 11'49"; Kyoung Jeong-soo 24'53"; Yoo Kyung-dong 38'56"	Report	Amanbaev 3'42"; Kubanychov 15'09", 26'13"; Makhmadaminov 27'43"; Dzhanat uulu 29'28"

Indoor Stadium Huamark, Bangkok
Referee: Lee Po-fu (Chinese Taipei)

=== Group D ===
Pos	Team	Pld	W	D	L	GF	GA	GD	Pts	Qualification
1	Iran	3	3	0	0	12	4	+8	9	Advance to the knockout stage
2	Afghanistan	3	1	1	1	7	8	−1	4	Advance to the knockout stage
3	Kuwait	3	1	1	1	5	8	−3	4	
4	Bahrain	3	0	0	3	6	10	−4	0	

Source: AFC
Rules for classification: Group stage tiebreakers
18 April 2024
16:00

Iran	3–1	Afghanistan
Karimi 9'27"; Ahmadabbasi 20'09", 21'11"	Report	Gholami 26'01"

Indoor Stadium Huamark, Bangkok
Referee: Fahad Al-Hosani (United Arab Emirates)
18 April 2024
21:00

Kuwait	2–1	Bahrain
Al-Farsi 32'26"; Al-Baeijan 34'38"	Report	Al-Araibi 26'29"

Indoor Stadium Huamark, Bangkok
Referee: Anatoliy Rubakov (Uzbekistan)

20 April 2024
16:00

Afghanistan	3–3	Kuwait
Mahmoodi 1'53"; Hosseinpour 22'45", 29'38" (pen.)	Report	Al-Alban 10'49"; Al-Mansour 11'46"; Al-Fadhel 24'01"

Indoor Stadium Huamark, Bangkok
Referee: Ryan Shepheard (Australia)
20 April 2024
21:00

Bahrain	3–5	Iran
Al-Noaimi 11'24"; Sanjar 18'07"; Al-Araibi 29'16"	Report	Rafieipour 11'39"; Karimi 21'21"; Ahmadabbasi 28'34", 38'29"; Azimi 32'13"

Indoor Stadium Huamark, Bangkok
Referee: Liu Jianqiao (China)

22 April 2024
21:00

Iran	4–0	Kuwait
Akrami 7'46"; Al-Farsi 16'33" (o.g.); Ahmadabbasi 20'00", 32'03" (pen.)	Report

Indoor Stadium Huamark, Bangkok
Referee: Benjapol Mucharoensap (Thailand)
22 April 2024
21:00

Bahrain	2–3	Afghanistan
Ali 14'39"; Sanjar 16'51" (pen.)	Report	Norowzi 4'54"; Kazemi 25'01"; Gholami 34'10"

Bangkok Arena, Bangkok
Referee: Andrew Best (Australia)

== Knockout stage ==
In the knockout stage, extra time and penalty shoot-out are used to decide the winner if necessary, except for the third place match where penalty shoot-out without extra time is used to decide the winner if necessary (Regulations Article 10).

The competition of the play-offs depended on the performance of Uzbekistan, who qualified automatically for the 2024 FIFA Futsal World Cup as hosts. Uzbekistan advanced to the semi-finals, therefore the play-offs format was held for the remaining four quarter-final losers to play a single elimination play-off. The winner of the play-off 3 qualified the 2024 FIFA Futsal World Cup.

Play-off 3
28 April
Afghanistan	5
Kyrgyzstan	3

Play-off 1 and 2
26 April
Iraq	3
Afghanistan	5
26 April
Vietnam	2
Kyrgyzstan	3

Quarter-finals
24 April
Thailand	3
Iraq	2
24 April
Tajikistan (a.e.t.)	2
Afghanistan	1
24 April
Uzbekistan	2
Vietnam	1
24 April
Iran	6
Kyrgyzstan	1

Semi-finals
26 April
Thailand (p)	3 (6)
Tajikistan	3 (5)
26 April
Uzbekistan	3 (4)
Iran (p)	3 (5)

Final
28 April
Thailand	1
Iran	4
Third place play-off
28 April
Tajikistan	5 (1)
Uzbekistan (p)	5 (3)

=== Quarter-finals ===
Winners qualified for the 2024 FIFA Futsal World Cup. Losers advanced to the play-offs.

24 April 2024
14:00

Tajikistan	2–1 (a.e.t.)	Afghanistan
Hosseinpoor 18'20" (o.g.); Sardorov 46'06" (pen.)	Report	Mahmoodi 22'40"

Indoor Stadium Huamark, Bangkok
Referee: Fahad Al-Hosani (United Arab Emirates)

24 April 2024
16:00

Iran	6–1	Kyrgyzstan
Azimi 7'08"; Aghapour 9'20"; Ahmadabbasi 23'35"; Karimi 25'21", 35'36"; Hassanzadeh 36'40" (pen.)	Report	Amanbaev 8'08"

Bangkok Arena, Bangkok
Referee: Pornnarong Grairod (Thailand)

24 April 2024
18:00

Thailand	3–2	Iraq
Alongkorn 18'15", 30'30"; Therdsak 38'57"	Report	Al-Husaynat 2'01"; Zeyad 15'54"

Indoor Stadium Huamark, Bangkok
Referee: Anatoliy Rubakov (Uzbekistan)

24 April 2024
21:00

Uzbekistan	2–1	Vietnam
Tukinov 33'24"; Juraev 39'02"	Report	Nguyễn Thịnh Phát 16'35"

Bangkok Arena, Bangkok
Referee: Eisa Abdul Houssain (Kuwait)

=== Play-off 1 and 2 ===
26 April 2024
14:00

Iraq	3–5	Afghanistan
Al-Husaynat 4'34", 26'26"; Albu-Mohammed 10'36"	Report	Kazemi 6'18"; Mahmoodi 9'55"; Gholami 12'28", 16'14"; J. Safari 39'58"

Indoor Stadium Huamark, Bangkok
Referee: Husain Al-Bahhar (Bahrain)

26 April 2024
16:00

Vietnam	2–3	Kyrgyzstan
Nguyễn Mạnh Dũng 12'56", 37'24"	Report	Alimov 8'13"; Makhmadaminov 23'26"; Talaibekov 38'48"

Bangkok Arena, Bangkok
Referee: Ebrahim Mehrabi Afshar (Iran)

=== Play-off 3 ===
The winner qualified for the 2024 FIFA Futsal World Cup.

28 April 2024
12:00

Afghanistan	5–3	Kyrgyzstan
Qanbari 07'29"; Askarbekov 28'35" (o.g.); Kazemi 31'25"; Norowzi 34'52"; Gholami 38'45"	Report	Norowzi 29'58" (o.g.); Amanbaev 36'20"; Dzhanat Uulu 39'56"

Bangkok Arena, Bangkok
Referee: Anatoliy Rubakov (Uzbekistan)

=== Semi-finals ===
26 April 2024
18:00

Thailand	3–3 (a.e.t.)	Tajikistan
Worasak 12'36"; Alongkorn 29'25"; Therdsak 37'15"	Report	Salomov 19'54"; Khojaev 22'30", 28'35"
Penalties
Worasak (penalty scored); Jirawat (penalty missed); Ronnachai (penalty missed); Suphawut (penalty scored); Itticha (penalty scored); Panut (penalty scored); Alongkorn (penalty scored); Narongsak (penalty scored)	6–5	(penalty missed) Alimakhmadov; (penalty scored) Umarov; (penalty scored) Rizomov; (penalty scored) Soliev; (penalty missed) Sardorov; (penalty scored) Kuziev; (penalty scored) Khojaev; (penalty missed) Salomov

Indoor Stadium Huamark, Bangkok
Referee: Ryan Shepheard (Australia)

26 April 2024
21:00

Uzbekistan	3–3 (a.e.t.)	Iran
Juraev 6'31"; Akhmetzyanov 17'48", 24'40"	Report	Adilov 3'44" (o.g.); Akhmetzyanov 23'46" (o.g.); Azimi 28'39"
Penalties
Juraev (penalty missed); Ropiev (penalty scored); Akhmetzyanov (penalty scored); Rakhmatov (penalty scored); Tulkinov (penalty scored); Botirov (penalty missed)	4–5	(penalty scored) Rafieipour; (penalty missed) Ahmadabbasi; (penalty scored) Sangsefidi; (penalty scored) Hassanzadeh; (penalty scored) Aghapour; (penalty scored) Karimi

Bangkok Arena, Bangkok
Referee: Hiroyuki Kobayashi (Japan)

=== Third place play-off ===
28 April 2024
15:00

Tajikistan	5–5	Uzbekistan
Rizomov 9'55", 29'32", 33'39"; Aliev 21'35"; Kuziev 34'38"	Report	Khamroev 1'29"; Tulkinov 4'38"; Khudoyberdiev 23'40"; Ropiev 26'20" (pen.); Usmonov 39'07"
Penalties
Sardorov (penalty missed); Aliev (penalty missed); Umarov (penalty scored); Soliev (penalty missed)	1–3	(penalty missed) Juraev; (penalty scored) Ropiev; (penalty scored) Akhmetzyanov; (penalty missed) Rakhmatov; (penalty scored) Tulkinov

Bangkok Arena, Bangkok
Referee: Hassan Al-Gburi (Iraq)

=== Final ===
28 April 2024
18:00

Thailand	1–4	Iran
Jirawat 25'13"	Report	Karimi 0'56"; Ahmadabbasi 5'13"; Hassanzadeh 26'24"; Mohammadi 34'34"

Bangkok Arena, Bangkok
Referee: Fahad Al-Hosani (United Arab Emirates)

== Winners ==
2024 AFC Futsal Asian Cup
(Iran)
Iran
Thirteenth title

== Awards ==
The following awards were given at the conclusion of the tournament:

Top scorer	Best player	Best goalkeeper	Fair-play award
(Iran) Saeid Ahmadabbasi	(Iran) Saeid Ahmadabbasi	(Iran) Bagher Mohammadi	Thailand

== Goalscorers ==
There have been 177 goals scored in 35 matches, for an average of 5.06 goals per match. Scores in play-off matches for the 2024 FIFA Futsal World Cup were included but not considered for the top goalscorer.

8 goals

- (Iran) Saeid Ahmadabbasi

5 goals

- (Iran) Mahdi Karimi
- (Iraq) Salim Faisal Al-Husaynat

4 goals

- (Afghanistan) Mehran Gholami
- (Iraq) Tareq Zeyad

3 goals

- (Afghanistan) Farzad Mahmoodi
- (Iran) Behrouz Azimi
- (Japan) Yūsei Arai
- (Kyrgyzstan) Maksat Alimov
- (Kyrgyzstan) Donierbek Amanbaev
- (Kyrgyzstan) Samat Dzhanat uulu
- (Kyrgyzstan) Kairat Kubanychov
- (Kyrgyzstan) Shokhrukh Makhmadaminov
- (Tajikistan) Komron Aliev
- (Tajikistan) Bahodur Khojaev
- (Tajikistan) Samandar Rizomov
- (Thailand) Alongkorn Janphon
- (Thailand) Muhammad Osamanmusa
- (Thailand) Suphawut Thueanklang
- (Uzbekistan) Abror Akhmetzyanov
- (Uzbekistan) Sunatulla Juraev
- (Uzbekistan) Elbek Tulkinov
- (Uzbekistan) Akbar Usmonov

2 goals

- (Afghanistan) Reza Hosseinpour
- (Afghanistan) Akbar Kazemi
- (Afghanistan) Mahdi Norowzi
- (Bahrain) Ali Al-Araibi
- (Bahrain) Saleh Sanjar
- (Iran) Ali Asghar Hassanzadeh
- (Iraq) Mustafa Ihsan Al-Bayati
- (Iraq) Harith Al-Obaidi
- (Iraq) Haedr Majed Al-Ogaili
- (Japan) António Hirata
- (Myanmar) Ko Ko Lwin
- (Saudi Arabia) Nawaf Mubarak Aroan
- (Tajikistan) Fayzali Sardorov
- (Thailand) Therdsak Charoenphong
- (Thailand) Worasak Srirangpirot
- (Uzbekistan) Mashrab Adilov
- (Uzbekistan) Dilshod Rakhmatov
- (Vietnam) Nguyễn Mạnh Dũng

1 goal

- (Afghanistan) Omid Qanbari
- (Afghanistan) Mohammad Javad Safari
- (Australia) Shervin Adeli
- (Australia) Ethan De Melo
- (Australia) Jamie Dib
- (Australia) Tyler Garner
- (Australia) Wade Giovenali
- (Australia) Michael Kouta
- (Bahrain) Ammar Hasan Ali
- (Bahrain) Mirza Al-Noaimi
- (China) Yakepujiang Maimaiti
- (China) Xu Yang
- (Iran) Salar Aghapour
- (Iran) Ali Akrami
- (Iran) Salar Aghapour
- (Iran) Bagher Mohammadi
- (Iraq) Mohanad Abdulhadi Albu-Mohammed
- (Iraq) Muheb Al-Deen Al-Taiel
- (Japan) Kentaro Ishida
- (Japan) Kazuhiro Nibuya
- (Japan) Yuta Tsutsumi
- (Kuwait) Naser Al-Alban
- (Kuwait) Sulman Al-Baeijan
- (Kuwait) Saleh Al-Fadhel
- (Kuwait) Ahmad Al-Farsi
- (Kuwait) Omar Al-Mansour
- (Kyrgyzstan) Daniiar Talaibekov
- (Myanmar) Hlaing Min Tun
- (Saudi Arabia) Abdullah Al-Maghrabi
- (Saudi Arabia) Fares Fahad Al-Maleh
- (Saudi Arabia) Abdulilah Al-Otaibi
- (Saudi Arabia) Eihab Saied Mohamed
- (South Korea) Kim Seung-hyun
- (South Korea) Kyoung Jeong-soo
- (South Korea) Lee Han-wool
- (South Korea) Lim Seung-ju
- (South Korea) Yoo Kyung-dong
- (Tajikistan) Umed Kuziev
- (Tajikistan) Dilshod Salomov
- (Tajikistan) Muhamadjon Sharipov
- (Thailand) Apiwat Chaemcharoen
- (Thailand) Panat Kittipanuwong
- (Thailand) Itticha Praphaphan
- (Thailand) Jirawat Sornwichian
- (Uzbekistan) Abbos Elmurodov
- (Uzbekistan) Ilkhomjon Khamroev
- (Uzbekistan) Mekhroj Khudoyberdiev
- (Uzbekistan) Ikhtiyor Ropiev
- (Vietnam) Đào Minh Quảng
- (Vietnam) Nguyễn Thịnh Phát
- (Vietnam) Nhan Gia Hưng
- (Vietnam) Từ Minh Quang

1 own goal

- (Afghanistan) Reza Hosseinpoor (against Tajikistan)
- (Afghanistan) Mahdi Norowzi (against Kyrgyzstan)
- (China) Shen Siming (against Myanmar)
- (Kuwait) Ahmad Al-Farsi (against Iran)
- (Kyrgyzstan) Mukhamed Askarbekov (against Afghanistan)
- (Uzbekistan) Mashrab Adilov (against Iran)
- (Uzbekistan) Abror Akhmetzyanov (against Iran)

== Team rankings ==
As per statistical convention in futsal, matches decided in extra time are counted as wins and losses, while matches decided by penalty shoot-outs are counted as draws. The AFC published the tournament standings in August 2024. Statistics in play-off matches for the 2024 FIFA Futsal World Cup are included in this table.

Pos	Team	Pld	W	D	L	GF	GA	GD	Pts	Final result
1	Iran	6	5	1	0	25	9	+16	16	Champions
2	Thailand (H)	6	4	1	1	17	11	+6	13	Runners-up
3	Uzbekistan	6	4	2	0	20	13	+7	14	Third place
4	Tajikistan	6	2	4	0	15	12	+3	10	Fourth place
5	Afghanistan	6	3	1	2	18	16	+2	10	Eliminated in quarter-finals (Note: The results of play-off matches were considered for the final standings published by the AFC, in contradiction to the AFC's general principle that play-off matches for international competitions are not to be considered for the standings.)
6	Kyrgyzstan	6	2	2	2	17	22	−5	8	Eliminated in quarter-finals
7	Vietnam	5	1	1	3	6	8	−2	4	Eliminated in quarter-finals
8	Iraq	5	2	0	3	17	15	+2	6	Eliminated in quarter-finals
9	Japan	3	1	1	1	8	4	+4	4	Eliminated in group stage (Note: For 9th to 16th place, teams are ranked in descending order as follows: position in the group stage, points in all group matches, goal difference in all group matches, goals scored in all group matches, disciplinary points in all group matches and drawing of lots.)
10	Kuwait	3	1	1	1	5	8	−3	4	Eliminated in group stage
11	Myanmar	3	1	1	1	4	7	−3	4	Eliminated in group stage
12	Saudi Arabia	3	1	0	2	6	10	−4	3	Eliminated in group stage
13	South Korea	3	0	1	2	5	12	−7	1	Eliminated in group stage
14	Bahrain	3	0	0	3	6	10	−4	0	Eliminated in group stage
15	China	3	0	0	3	2	7	−5	0	Eliminated in group stage
16	Australia	3	0	0	3	6	13	−7	0	Eliminated in group stage

Source: AFC
(H) Hosts

== Qualified teams for the 2024 FIFA Futsal World Cup ==
Semi-finalists including Iran, Tajikistan and Thailand qualified for the 2024 FIFA Futsal World Cup besides Uzbekistan who automatically qualified as host. As Uzbekistan reached the semi-finals, a play-off round was held to determine the last Asian spot at the Futsal World Cup. Afghanistan won a play-off round. Thailand were the only team from ASEAN in the Futsal World Cup among the Central Asian teams.

Tajikistan and Afghanistan made their debut. Iran, Thailand and Uzbekistan continued their appearing. Iran have been the most appearances in the Futsal World Cup with eight and the most successful team from AFC with the third place in 2016. Thailand and Uzbekistan have appeared for the sixth and second time, respectively, with their best finish at the round of 16.

Japan and Vietnam who previously qualified in 2021 stopped qualifying in the Futsal World Cup for the sixth and third time, respectively. Japan were eliminated in the group stage for the first time by a loss to Kyrgyzstan and a draw to Tajikistan. Vietnam were eliminated in the play-offs after being defeated by Kyrgyzstan.

The following five teams from AFC qualified for the 2024 FIFA Futsal World Cup.

Team	Qualified on	Previous appearances in the FIFA Futsal World Cup
Uzbekistan	23 June 2023	2 (2016, 2021)
Tajikistan	24 April 2024	0 (debut)
Iran	24 April 2024	8 (1992, 1996, 2000, 2004, 2008, 2012, 2016, 2021)
Thailand	24 April 2024	6 (2000, 2004, 2008, 2012, 2016, 2021)
Afghanistan	28 April 2024	0 (debut)

^{1} Italic indicates host for that year.

== Marketing ==
=== Official song ===
The official song of the tournament, "What a Goal" by Ford Trio and Chucky Factory Land, was released on 4 April 2024.

=== Mascot ===
"Ramma Chana" was the mascot of the tournament. "Rama" refers to Phra Ram, main figures of Ramakien which is a Thai version of the ancient Indian epic Ramayana. "Chana" means win in Thai. It was formed by combining many types of animals such as onyx dragon, macchanu, elephants, tigers, cats, and kirin, creating a new character similar to the animals of Himavanta.

=== Sponsorship ===
Official Global Partners

- Continental AG
- Credit Saison
- Neom
- Qatar Airways
- Visit Saudi
- Yili Group (Joyday, Cremo Thailand, Ambpoeial Yili, Inikin Yili)

Official Global Supporters

- Kelme
- Konami (eFootball)

== Broadcasting rights ==
The broadcasters around the world that acquired the rights to the tournament included:

Territory	Broadcaster(s)
Australia	Paramount+
Bangladesh	T Sports
China	IQIYI Sports, Migu
India	FanCode
Indonesia	MNC Media, RCTI
Iraq	Alrabiaa
Japan	DAZN
Kyrgyzstan	KTRK
Macau	M Plus Live
Malaysia	Astro SuperSport
Maldives	MediaNet
Middle East	beIN Sports, Alkass
Mongolia	Premier Sports
Myanmar	Canal+
Saudi Arabia	SSC
South Korea	tvN SPORTS
Taiwan	ELTA
Thailand	T Sports 7
Timor-Leste	MNC Media, RCTI
Turkmenistan	Saran Media
United Arab Emirates	Abu Dhabi Media
Uzbekistan	MTRK
Vietnam	FPT

Territory	Broadcaster(s)
Austria	Sportdigital
Balkans	Sport Klub
Bulgaria	Gong.bg
Caribbean	ESPN
CIS	TV Start
Finland	MTV Kastomi
Germany	Sportdigital
Kazakhstan	Sport+
Latin America	Star+
Middle East	beIN Sports, Alkass
Pacific Islands	FreeTV Australia
Papua New Guinea	MNC Media, RCTI
Sub-Saharan Africa	beIN Sports, Alkass
Sweden	TV4 Play
Switzerland	Sportdigital
