= 2017 AFF Futsal Club Championship =

Tournament details
- Host country: Thailand
- City: Bangkok
- Dates: 3–9 July
- Teams: 8 (from 1 sub-confederation)
- Venue: 1 (in 1 host city)

Final positions
- Champions: (Thailand) Thai Port

Tournament statistics
- Matches played: 16
- Goals scored: 120 (7.5 per match)

2017 AFF Invitational Futsal Club Championship was the third edition of AFF Futsal Club Championship. The tournament was held in Bangkok, Thailand, from 3 to 9 July 2017. The futsal clubs from AFF member countries were invited to compete in this tournament. Thai Port (men) and Jaya Kencana Angels Futsal Club (women) were the title holders from the previous edition. For this edition, only the men's division was contested.

== Participants ==
=== Group A ===
| Association | Team |
|---|---|
| Thailand | Thai Port |
| Brunei | Shah United |
| Myanmar | Pyay United |
| Indonesia | Permata Indah Futsal |

=== Group B ===
| Association | Team |
|---|---|
| Australia | East Coast Heat |
| Vietnam | Sanna Khanh Hoa |
| Malaysia | Melaka United |
| Laos | Vientiane United |

== Venue ==
Bangkok
| Bangkok Arena | Location of stadiums of the 2017 AFF Futsal Club Championship. |
| Capacity: 12,000 | Location of stadiums of the 2017 AFF Futsal Club Championship. |

== Group stage ==
=== Group A ===
| Pos | Team | Pld | W | D | L | GF | GA | GD | Pts | Qualification |
|---|---|---|---|---|---|---|---|---|---|---|
| 1 | (Thailand) Thai Port (H) | 3 | 3 | 0 | 0 | 18 | 3 | +15 | 9 | Knockout stage |
| 2 | (Indonesia) Permata Indah Futsal | 3 | 2 | 0 | 1 | 16 | 11 | +5 | 6 | Knockout stage |
| 3 | (Myanmar) Pyay United | 3 | 1 | 0 | 2 | 12 | 14 | −2 | 3 | |
| 4 | (Brunei) Shah United | 3 | 0 | 0 | 3 | 6 | 24 | −18 | 0 | |

Source: AFF
(H) Hosts
3 July 2017
14:15 UTC+07:00

| Shah United (Brunei) | 1–8 | (Myanmar) Pyay United |
|---|---|---|
| Anto Cahyo 34' | AFF | Nyein Min Soe 8'; Aung Zin Oo 8', 18', 24', 24', 34'; Aung Myo Tun 27'; Aung Kyaw Soe 29' |

Bangkok Arena, Bangkok
Referee: Helday Idang (MAS)
3 July 2017
16:15 UTC+07:00

| Thai Port (Thailand) | 4–1 | (Indonesia) Permata Indah Futsal |
|---|---|---|
| Anukul Mini 6'; Lertchai Issarasuwipakorn 26'; Rattikun Plonghirun 28'; Thiago Mora 34' | AFF | Andri Yana 37' |

Bangkok Arena, Bangkok
Referee: Khampasong Xayavongsy (LAO)

4 July 2017
14:15 UTC+07:00

| Permata Indah Futsal (Indonesia) | 6–3 | (Brunei) Shah United |
|---|---|---|
| Fachri Reza 2'; Berkenice Victorius 7'; Rico Zulkarnain 8', 27'; Eko Sutrisno 25'; Ardianshah 38' | AFF | Dennis Guna 3'; Anton Cahyo 23', 40' |

Bangkok Arena, Bangkok
Referee: Mohd Ridzuan Rodzali (MAS)
4 July 2017
16:15 UTC+07:00

| Pyay United (Myanmar) | 0–4 | (Thailand) Thai Port |
|---|---|---|
| | AFF | Watchara Laisri 1'; Warin Romanee 32'; Chaivat Jamgrajang 35'; Thiago Mora 36' |

Bangkok Arena, Bangkok
Referee: Ly Hoang Ha Thi (VIE)

5 July 2017
14:15 UTC+07:00

| Permata Indah Futsal (Indonesia) | 9–4 | (Myanmar) Pyay United |
|---|---|---|
| Nyein Min Soe 11' (og.); Ardiansyah 12', 27'; Yusuf A. K 17'; Rahmat 26', 31', 35'; K. El Hattach 35'; Muhammad Ali 40' | AFF | Aung Myo Tun 25'; Pyae Phyo Maung 30'; Aung Zin Oo 32', 37' |

Bangkok Arena, Bangkok
Referee: Helday Idang (MAS)
5 July 2017
16:15 UTC+07:00

| Thai Port (Thailand) | 10–2 | (Brunei) Shah United |
|---|---|---|
| Anantachai Prabwongsa 1'; Rattikun Plonghirun 5', 27'; Thiago Mora 9'; Nopadol Kokpermsub 11'; Thanakorn Penpakul 19', 28'; Anton Cahyo 35' (og.); Sarawut Jaipech 36', 37' | AFF | Dennis Guna 22'; Abdul Azim 40' |

Bangkok Arena, Bangkok
Referee: Khampasong Xayavongsy (LAO)

=== Group B ===
| Pos | Team | Pld | W | D | L | GF | GA | GD | Pts | Qualification |
|---|---|---|---|---|---|---|---|---|---|---|
| 1 | (Vietnam) Sanna Khanh Hoa | 3 | 2 | 1 | 0 | 16 | 5 | +11 | 7 | Knockout stage |
| 2 | (Malaysia) Melaka United | 3 | 1 | 2 | 0 | 12 | 6 | +6 | 5 | Knockout stage |
| 3 | (Australia) East Coast Heat | 3 | 1 | 1 | 1 | 9 | 12 | −3 | 4 | |
| 4 | (Laos) Vientiane United | 3 | 0 | 0 | 3 | 7 | 21 | −14 | 0 | |

Source: AFF
3 July 2017
12:15 UTC+07:00

| East Coast Heat (Australia) | 4–3 | (Laos) Vientiane United |
|---|---|---|
| Jamie Dib 3'; Anthony Hadad 27', 29'; Laureano Gomez 30' | AFF | Chanthaphone Waenvongsoth 9'; Soulichanh Phasawaeng 33'; Alounyadeth Saysanavongsi 35' |

Bangkok Arena, Bangkok
Referee: Pornnarong Grairod (THA)
3 July 2017
18:15 UTC+07:00

| Sanna Khanh Hoa (Vietnam) | 1–1 | (Malaysia) Melaka United |
|---|---|---|
| Mai Thanh Dat 20' | AFF | Khairul Effendy 3' |

Bangkok Arena, Bangkok
Referee: Shukry Mattasim (BRU)

4 July 2017
12:15 UTC+07:00

| Vientiane United (Laos) | 2–9 | (Vietnam) Sanna Khanh Hoa |
|---|---|---|
| Phoumiphonh Detxomphou 12'; Khampha Phiphakkhavong 39' | AFF | Nguyen Quoc Bao 1', 33'; Y Nghia Eban 3'; Nguyen Nho 4'; Phan Khac Chi 19'; Mai Thanh Dat 21'; Tran Quang Toan 26'; Tran Van Thanh 30'; Nguyen Thanh Hung 35' |

Bangkok Arena, Bangkok
Referee: Ikhwan Laksono (IDN)
4 July 2017
18:15 UTC+07:00

| Melaka United (Malaysia) | 3–3 | (Australia) East Coast Heat |
|---|---|---|
| Khairul Effendy 3', 39'; Akmarulnizam 19' | AFF | Laureano Gomez 20'; Jordan Aaron 27'; Christopher Anthony 30' |

Bangkok Arena, Bangkok
Referee: Attapon Yanyongsewee (THA)

5 July 2017
12:15 UTC+07:00

| East Coast Heat (Australia) | 2–6 | (Vietnam) Sanna Khanh Hoa |
|---|---|---|
| Laureano Gomez 10'; Lachlan Wright 39' | AFF | Phan Khac Chi 22', 34', 39'; Y Nghia Eban 32'; Khong Dinh Hung 36'; Mai Thanh Dat 38' |

Bangkok Arena, Bangkok
Referee: Pornnarong Grairod (THA)
5 July 2017
18:15 UTC+07:00

| Vientiane United (Laos) | 2–8 | (Malaysia) Melaka United |
|---|---|---|
| Vanhnasone Lamxay 6'; Soulichanh Phasawaeng 34' | AFF | Awaluddin Hassan 1', 33'; Firdaus Ambiah 16'; Khairul Effendy 20'; Shamsul Amar 22', 32'; Yazid Kamaruzuan 38'; Jamaluddin Alias 38' |

Bangkok Arena, Bangkok
Referee: Shukry Mattasim (BRU)

== Knockout stage ==
=== Bracket ===
Semi-finals
Sanna Khanh Hoa | 3
Permata Indah Futsal | 0
Thai Port | 8
Melaka United | 1

Final
Sanna Khanh Hoa | 0
Thai Port | 4
Third place
Permata Indah Futsal | 2
Melaka United | 4

=== Semi-finals ===
7 July 2017
14:15 UTC+07:00

| Sanna Khanh Hoa (Vietnam) | 3–0 | (Indonesia) Permata Indah Futsal |
|---|---|---|
| Nguyen Quoc Bao 3'; Mai Thanh Dat 20'; Tran Van Thanh 29' | AFF |

Bangkok Arena, Bangkok
Referee: Mohd Ridzuan Rodzali (MAS)
7 July 2017
16:15 UTC+07:00

| Thai Port (Thailand) | 8–1 | (Malaysia) Melaka United |
|---|---|---|
| Thanakorn Panpakul 6', 39'; Shamsul Amar 9' (o.g.); Marcos Vinicius 12'; Anukul Mini 18'; Lertchai Issarasuwipakorn 29'; Warin Romanee 33'; Sarawut Jaipech 35' | AFF | Anukul Mini 5' (o.g.) |

Bangkok Arena, Bangkok
Referee: Khampasong Xayavongsy (LAO)

=== Third place match ===
9 July 2017
14:15 UTC+07:00

| Permata Indah Futsal (Indonesia) | 2–4 | (Malaysia) Melaka United |
|---|---|---|
| Firdaus Ambiah 6' (o.g.); Rahmat Arsyad 40' | AFF | Saiful Aula 8'; Shamsul Amar 35', 36'; Yazid Kamaruzuan 38' |

Bangkok Arena, Bangkok
Referee: Pannarong Grairod (THA)

=== Final ===
9 July 2017
16:15 UTC+07:00

| Sanna Khanh Hoa (Vietnam) | 0–4 | (Thailand) Thai Port |
|---|---|---|
| | AFF | Nguyen Quoc Bao 3' (o.g.); Chaivat Jamgrajang 5', 38'; Marcos Vinicius 33' |

Bangkok Arena, Bangkok
Referee: Helday Idang (MAS)

== Winner ==
2017 AFF Futsal Club Championship Champion
(Thailand)
Thai Port
Third title
