= 2016 AFF Futsal Club Championship =

Tournament details
- Host country: Myanmar
- City: Naypyidaw
- Dates: 10–16 July
- Teams: 5 Men Division 5 Women Division (from 1 confederation)
- Venue: Sport Complex Indoor Stadium (in Naypyidaw host cities)

Final positions
- Champions: (Thailand) Thai Port (men) (Indonesia) Jaya Kencana Angels (women)

2016 AFF Invitational Futsal Club Championship was the second edition of AFF Futsal Club Championship. The tournament was held in Naypyidaw, Myanmar from 10 to 16 July 2016. The futsal clubs from AFF member countries were invited to compete in this tournament. Thai Port (men) and Thai Son Nam (women) were the title holders from the previous edition.

== Participants ==
=== Men division ===
Association	Team	Qualified as
Thailand	Thai Port	Defending champion
Myanmar	MIC	Host representative / 2016 Myanmar Futsal League champion
Vietnam	Thai Son Nam	2016 Vietnam Futsal League champion
Laos	Lanexang United	Laos representatives
Indonesia	Black Steel Manokwari	2016 Indonesia Pro Futsal League champion

=== Women division ===
Association	Team	Qualified as
Vietnam	Thai Son Nam	Defending champion
Myanmar	WFC	Host representative
Thailand	Bangkok Futsal Team	2015 Thailand National Games runners-up
Thailand	Khon Kaen Futsal Team	2015 Thailand National Games semi-finalists
Indonesia	Jaya Kencana Angels	2016 Indonesia Women Futsal League Champion

== Venue ==
All matches of 2016 AFF Futsal Club Championship were held in Sport Complex Indoor Stadium, commonly named Wunna Theikdi Indoor Stadium, in Naypyidaw, Myanmar.

== Men division ==
=== Group stage ===
Team	Pld	W	D	L	GF	GA	GD	Pts	Qualification
(Thailand) Thai Port	4	4	0	0	19	3	+16	12	Qualification to final match
(Vietnam) Thai Son Nam	4	3	0	1	25	11	+14	9	Qualification to final match
(Indonesia) Black Steel	4	1	1	2	18	18	0	4	Qualification to third place match
(Myanmar) MIC FC	4	1	1	2	12	13	−1	4	Qualification to third place match
(Laos) Lanexang United	4	0	0	4	16	45	−29	0	

10 July 2016
14.00 UTC+6:30

MIC FC (Myanmar)	1 – 1	(Indonesia) Black Steel
Aung Aung 18'	Report	Panji 17'

Sport Complex Indoor Stadium, Naypyidaw
Attendance: N/A
Referee: Sopheak Saing (Cambodia)

10 July 2016
19.00 UTC+6:30

Lanexang United (Laos)	4 – 14	(Vietnam) Thai Son Nam
Chanchaleune 4'; Phasawaeng 23'; Phommalivong 19', 20'	Report	Nguyen Bao Quan 1', 19'; Ngo Ngoc Son 4', 12', 31', 33'; Iskanderovich 5'; Saul 16', 17'; Tran Thai Huy 18', 39'; Nguyen Minh Tri 25', 26', 36'

Sport Complex Indoor Stadium, Naypyidaw
Attendance: N/A
Referee: Nattawat Thongkham (Thailand)

11 July 2016
14.00 UTC+6:30

Thai Son Nam (Vietnam)	0 – 4	(Thailand) Thai Port
	Report	Laisri 6'; Chomboon 19'; Plonghurun 36'; Srisubseang 37'

Sport Complex Indoor Stadium, Naypyidaw
Attendance: 100
Referee: Sukry Haji Matassim (Brunei)

11 July 2016
19.00 UTC+6:30

Lanexang United (Laos)	5 – 9	(Myanmar) MIC FC
Kyaw Htet Aung 5 (og.)' Vongchiengkham 18', 31'; Phiphakkavong 22', 23'	Report	Aung Aung 1', 13', 24', 31', 39'; Kaung Chit Tu 7'; Naing Ye Kyaw 21', 38'; Tin Win Ko Ko 36'

Sport Complex Indoor Stadium, Naypyidaw
Attendance: 100
Referee: Nattawat Thongkham (Thailand)

12 July 2016
14.00 UTC+6:30

Thai Port (Thailand)	9 – 0	(Laos) Lanexang United
Srisubseang 12', 31'; Jamgrajang 14', 22'; De Oliveira 31'; Tabdoung 34'; Plonghirun 35'; Janhomhual 35'; Romanee 35'	Report

Sport Complex Indoor Stadium, Naypyidaw
Attendance: 100
Referee: Thiha Kyaw (Myanmar)

12 July 2016
19.00 UTC+6:30

Black Steel (Indonesia)	2 – 7	(Vietnam) Thai Son Nam
Mochammad Iqbal Iskandar 10'; Waroy 10'	Report	Tran Thai Huy 9'; Saul 26', 35'; Tran Long Vu 28'; Rumburen (og.) 32'; Iskanderovich 33', 38'

Sport Complex Indoor Stadium, Naypyidaw
Attendance: 100
Referee: Khampasong Xayavongsy (Laos)

13 July 2016
14.00 UTC+6:30

Lanexang United (Laos)	7 – 13	(Indonesia) Black Steel
Vongchiengkham 5'; Siviengxay 10'; Chanchaleune 21', 27', 32'; Kobari 39'; Nurhadi 40 (og.)'		Waroy 4', 19'; Runtuboy 5', 12', 37'; Rumburen 16'; Yembise 19'; Afdal 22', 37'; Iskandar 24'; Nurhadi 29'; Panji 25', 30'

Sport Complex Indoor Stadium, Naypyidaw

13 July 2016
19.00 UTC+6:30

MIC FC (Myanmar)	1 – 3	(Thailand) Thai Port

Sport Complex Indoor Stadium, Naypyidaw

14 July 2016
14.00 UTC+6:30

Thai Son Nam (Vietnam)	4 – 1	(Myanmar) MIC FC
Ngo Ngoc Son 5', 25'; Nguyen Minh Tri 16'; Tran Van Vu 36'	Report	Aung Aung 37'

Sport Complex Indoor Stadium, Naypyidaw
Attendance: 100
Referee: Nattawat Thongkham (Thailand)

14 July 2016
19.00 UTC+6:30

Black Steel (Indonesia)	2 – 3	(Thailand) Thai Port
Marselino 9', 38'	Report	Tabdoung 9'; De Oliveira 11'; Plonghirun 37'

Sport Complex Indoor Stadium, Naypyidaw
Attendance: 100
Referee: Thiha Kyaw (Myanmar)

=== Third place match ===
16 July 2016
14.00 UTC+6:30

MIC FC (Myanmar)	7 – 5	(Indonesia) Black Steel
Pyae Phyo Maung 9', 36', 36'; Kaung Chit Thu 14'; Htet Myat Naing 21'; Naing Ye Kyaw 27'; Aung Aung 39'		Runtuboy 7', 23'; Rumburen 8', 19'; Panji 21'

Sport Complex Indoor Stadium, Naypyidaw

=== Final ===
16 July 2016
19.00 UTC+6:30

Thai Port (Thailand)	4 – 3	(Vietnam) Thai Son Nam
Plonghirun 14'; Jamgrajang 23', 23'; De Oliveira 24'		Nguyen Minh Tri 8'; Nguyen Bao Quan 9'; Ngo Ngoc Son 25'

Sport Complex Indoor Stadium, Naypyidaw

=== Winner ===
AFF Futsal Club Championship
2016 Men Champions
(Thailand)
Thai Port
Second title

== Women division ==
=== Group stage ===
Team	Pld	W	D	L	GF	GA	GD	Pts	Qualification
(Indonesia) Jaya Kencana Angels	4	3	0	1	16	8	+8	9	Qualification to final match
(Thailand) Khon Kaen Futsal Team	4	3	0	1	11	6	+5	9	Qualification to final match
(Vietnam) Thai Son Nam	4	2	1	1	12	7	+5	7	Qualification to third place match
(Thailand) Bangkok Futsal Team	4	0	2	2	5	15	−10	2	Qualification to third place match
(Myanmar) WFC	4	0	1	3	6	14	−8	1	

10 July 2016
11.30 UTC+6:30

Bangkok Futsal Team (Thailand)	1 – 4	(Thailand) Khon Kaen Futsal Team
Bubpha 40'	Report	Sriroj 23'; Waenngoen 40'; Pakthongchai 14', 24'

Sport Complex Indoor Stadium, Naypyidaw
Attendance: 600
Referee: Thiya Kyaw (Myanmar)

10 July 2016
16.00 UTC+6:30

WFC (Myanmar)	3 – 5	(Indonesia) Jaya Kencana Angels
Pa Pa Win 28'; Su Po Po Kyaw 36'; Nilar Myint 38'	Report	Rosdiana 13'; Mulyasari 32', 40'; Septiawati 35'; Hilda 35'

Sport Complex Indoor Stadium, Naypyidaw
Attendance: N/A
Referee: Sukry Haji Matassim (Brunei)

11 July 2016
11.30 UTC+6:30

Jaya Kencana Angels (Indonesia)	1 – 3	(Vietnam) Thai Son Nam
Mulyasari 17'	Report	Thai Thi Thao 3', 29'; Nguyen Thi Thanh 6'

Sport Complex Indoor Stadium, Naypyidaw
Attendance: 100
Referee: Khampasong Xayavongsy (Laos)

11 July 2016
16.30 UTC+6:30

WFC (Myanmar)	1 – 1	(Thailand) Bangkok Futsal Team
Tint Tint Tun 38'	Report	Bubpha 21'

Sport Complex Indoor Stadium, Naypyidaw
Attendance: 100
Referee: Emmanuel Elloso (Philippines)

12 July 2016
11.30 UTC+6:30

Thai Son Nam (Vietnam)	5 – 1	(Myanmar) WFC
Do Thi Nguyen 4'; Le Thi My Hanh 5'; Nguyen Thi Chau 8'; Thai Thi Thao 17'; Zin Min Tun 19 (og.)'	Report	Khing Mar Oo 31'

Sport Complex Indoor Stadium, Naypyidaw
Attendance: 100
Referee: Nattawat Thongkham (Thailand)

12 July 2016
16.30 UTC+6:30

Khon Kaen Futsal Team (Thailand)	0 – 1	(Indonesia) Jaya Kencana Angels
		A. Sari 12'

Sport Complex Indoor Stadium, Naypyidaw
Attendance: N/A

12 July 2016
11.30 UTC+6:30

WFC (Myanmar)	1 – 3	(Thailand) Khon Kaen Futsal Team

Sport Complex Indoor Stadium, Naypyidaw
Attendance: N/A

13 July 2016
16.30 UTC+6:30

Bangkok Futsal Team (Thailand)	1 – 1	(Vietnam) Thai Son Nam

Sport Complex Indoor Stadium, Naypyidaw
Attendance: N/A

14 July 2016
11.30 UTC+6:30

Jaya Kencana Angels (Indonesia)	9 – 2	(Thailand) Bangkok Futsal Team
Susanti 1'; Mulyasari 5', 24'; Rosdiana 8', 16'; A. Sari 12'; Piranti 26', 29'; I. Sari 32'	Report	Lertlop 35'; Sampattonglan 40'

Sport Complex Indoor Stadium, Naypyidaw
Attendance: 100
Referee: Khampasong Xayavongsy (Laos)

14 July 2016
16.30 UTC+6:30

Khon Kaen Futsal Team (Thailand)	4 – 3	(Vietnam) Thai Son Nam
Tupsuri 23'; Sriroj 33', 33', 33'	Report	Nguyen Thi Thanh 2'; Thai Thi Thao 7', 31'

Sport Complex Indoor Stadium, Naypyidaw
Attendance: 100
Referee: Sukry Haji Matassim (Brunei)

=== Third place match ===
16 July 2016
12:30 UTC+6:30

Thai Son Nam (Vietnam)	3 – 2	(Thailand) Bangkok Futsal Team

Sport Complex Indoor Stadium, Naypyidaw

=== Final ===
16 July 2016
16.30 UTC+6:30

Khon Kaen Futsal Team (Thailand)	2 - 2 (a.e.t.)	(Indonesia) Jaya Kencana Angels
Hilda 2 (og.)' Sriroj 37'		Susanti 12'; Septiawati 27'
Penalties
Peanpailun (penalty scored); Tupsuri (penalty missed); Sriroj (penalty scored); Srimanee (penalty scored); Pakthongchai (penalty scored); Srimuang (penalty missed)	4-5	Novryliani (penalty scored); Susanti (penalty missed); Mulyasari (penalty scored); Piranti (penalty scored); Rosdiana (penalty scored); A. Sari (penalty scored)

Sport Complex Indoor Stadium, Naypyidaw

=== Winner ===
AFF Futsal Club Championship
2016 Women Champions
(Indonesia)
Jaya Kencana Angels
First title
