= 2020 Indonesia Pro Futsal League =

Indonesia Pro Futsal League
- Dates: 7 December 2019 – 28 March 2021
- Champions: Black Steel
- Matches: 116
- Goals: 764 (6.59 per match)
- Top goalscorer: Andri Kustiawan (Bintang Timur) (28 goals)
- All statistics correct as of 29 March 2021.

The 2020 Indonesia Pro Futsal League, was the thirteenth season of the Indonesia Pro Futsal League competition held by the Indonesian Futsal Federation, as well as the fifth season of futsal competition under the name "Professional Futsal League". The season started on 7 December 2019 and ended on 28 March 2021.

Vamos Mataram were the defending champions. A total of 16 Indonesian futsal clubs will compete for the championship of this competition, with four clubs coming from the 2019 Nusantara Futsal League semifinalists.

On 16 March 2020, the competition was suspended due to the COVID-19 pandemic in Indonesia, and restarted on 20 March 2021. All matches after the restart were played in Yogyakarta, with the final four played at the Among Rogo Sports Hall.

== Teams ==
A total of 16 Indonesian futsal clubs which are divided into two groups competed this season. Four of these clubs are 2019 Nusantara Futsal League.

=== Team changes ===
- Permata Indah FC Manokwari resigned and was replaced by Red Manguni FC from Minahasa.
- AXM FC Manado, one of the promoted teams from the 2019 Nusantara Futsal League, they resign from the competition due to internal problems. and was replaced by club from Surabaya, Mutiara FC
- Devina Kamiada FC resigned and was replaced by Futsal 35 FC from Bandung.

=== Name changes ===
- Young Rior FC partnership with corporate Aneka Tambang, and the name into MAS Young Rior FC.

Team	2019 season	City	Province
Bank Sumut	Nusantara League; 3rd place	Medan	North Sumatra
Bintang Timur	Pro League; 4th place	Surabaya	East Java
BJL 2000	Nusantara League champions	Semarang	Central Java
Black Steel	Pro League runner-up	Manokwari	West Papua
Cosmo FC	Pro League; 3rd in Group B	Jakarta	Jakarta
Futsal 35	Pro League; 4th in Grup B (Note: As Devina Kamiada)	Bandung	West Java
Giga FC	Pro League; 5th in Group B	Metro (city)	Lampung
Halus FC	Pro League; 4th in Group A	Jakarta	Jakarta
IPC Pelindo II	Pro League; 3rd in Group A	Jakarta	Jakarta
Jeck Kato 86	National League runner-up	Berau Regency	East Kalimantan
Kancil BBK	Pro League; 5th in Group A	Pontianak	West Kalimantan
MAS–Young Rior	Pro League; 6th in Group B	North Luwu Regency	South Sulawesi
Mutiara FC	Nusantara League; 4th place (Note: As AXM FC Manado)	Surabaya	East Java
Red Manguni	Pro League; 6th in Group A (Note: As Permata Indah Manokwari)	Minahasa Regency	North Sulawesi
SKN FC	Pro League; 3rd place	Kebumen	Central Java
Vamos FC	Pro League champions	Mataram (city)	West Nusa Tenggara

The 2020 Indonesia Pro Futsal League clubs origins ( Red: Group A, Blue: Group B).

== Venues and Schedule ==
Thirteen venues in eleven cities in Indonesia became the venue for the Indonesia 2020 Professional Futsal League. Regular season (group stage) began from December 7, 2019 to March 22, 2020, while the Big Four (final series) took place on March 28 and 29, 2020 in Yogyakarta.

Red: Regular season and Big four Yellow: Regular season.

Indonesian Professional Futsal League season 2020 regular schedule.

Grup A		Grup B	
Venues	Dates	Venues	Dates
Mustika Sports Hall, Blora	7-8 December 2019	Sasana Krida Sports Hall, Purwokerto	14-15 December 2019
Among Rogo Sports Hall, Yogyakarta	4-5 January 2020	Bojonegoro Sports Hall, Bojonegoro	11-12 January 2020
Ciracas Sports Hall, East Jakarta	18-19 January 2020	POPKI Sports Hall, Jakarta	25-26 January 2020
Sudiang Sports Hall, Makassar	1-2 February 2020	GSG Pemprov Sumatra Utara, Medan	8-9 February 2020
Giga Futsal Arena, Metro City	15-16 February 2020	Jakabaring Sport City, Palembang	22-23 February 2020
17 December Sports Hall, Mataram	29 February-1 March 2020	POPKI Sports Hall, Jakarta	7-8 March 2020
Sasana Krida Sports Hall, Purwokerto	14-15 March 2020	UNY Sports Hall, Yogyakarta	20-21 March 2021

== Regular season ==
=== Group A ===
Pos	Team	Pld	W	D	L	GF	GA	GD	Pts	Qualification or relegation
1	Black Steel	14	13	1	0	66	19	+47	40	Qualified to semi-final
2	Vamos FC	14	10	1	3	60	30	+30	31	Qualified to semi-final
3	MAS Young Rior	14	5	5	4	45	42	+3	20	
4	Giga FC	14	6	1	7	43	48	−5	19	
5	Halus FC	14	5	2	7	44	49	−5	17	
6	Jeck Kato 86	14	5	0	9	37	54	−17	15	
7	Futsal 35	14	3	3	8	31	53	−22	12	Relegation to Nusantara Futsal League
8	BJL 2000	14	2	1	11	25	56	−31	7	Relegation to Nusantara Futsal League

Updated to match(es) played on 15 March 2020. Source: Bolalob
Rules for classification: 1) Points; 2) Goal difference; 3) Goals scored.

Home \ Away	BJL	BSM	FTL	GIG	HAL	JEK	MSY	VAM
BJL 2000	—	1–5	1–4	2–3	1–5	2–3	3–2	3–6
Black Steel	7–1	—	8–1	3–1	2–1	6–2	2–2	4–2
Futsal 35	4–2	2–6	—	2–2	2–2	1–4	2–5	2–5
Giga FC	4–1	0–3	2–1	—	2–7	7–2	3–6	2–7
Halus FC	3–5	1–5	7–2	4–5	—	3–2	3–3	0–3
Jeck Kato 86	4–0	1–5	2–4	1–7	2–5	—	8–6	4–6
MAS Young Rior	2–2	3–6	2–2	4–3	6–2	1–0	—	2–2
Vamos FC	4–1	1–4	5–2	5–2	9–1	1–2	4–1	—

Updated to match(es) played on 15 March 2020. Source: Bolalob
Legend: Blue = home team win; Yellow = draw; Red = away team win.
For upcoming matches, an "a" indicates there is an article about the rivalry between the two participants.

=== Group B ===
Pos	Team	Pld	W	D	L	GF	GA	GD	Pts	Qualification or relegation
1	SKN FC	14	12	1	1	63	26	+37	37	Qualified to semi-final
2	Bintang Timur	14	10	2	2	84	27	+57	32	Qualified to semi-final
3	Cosmo FC	14	8	3	3	59	36	+23	27	
4	IPC Pelindo II	14	7	2	5	39	34	+5	23	
5	Kancil BBK	14	7	0	7	49	46	+3	21	
6	Bank Sumut	14	3	1	10	26	57	−31	10	
7	Red Manguni	13	2	2	9	36	80	−44	8	Relegation to Nusantara Futsal League
8	Mutiara FC	14	1	1	12	21	71	−50	4	Relegation to Nusantara Futsal League

Updated to match(es) played on 21 March 2021. Source: Bolalob
Rules for classification: 1) Points; 2) Goal difference; 3) Goals scored.

Home \ Away	BAS	BTS	COS	IPC	KAN	MTR	RMG	SKN
Bank Sumut	—	2–5	2–4	3–2	0–6	5–1	2–2	0–5
Bintang Timur	8–0	—	3–4	1–1	8–1	5–2	6–1	1–0
Cosmo Futsal	2–1	4–4	—	3–4	2–3	3–0	6–0	3–7
IPC Pelindo II	5–2	2–5	3–3	—	5–3	2–1	2–4	1–2
Kancil BBK	3–2	2–4	1–4	1–2	—	4–2	5–3	3–4
Mutiara FC	0–3	0–19	1–5	1–5	2–3	—	5–3	1–7
Red Manguni	6–3	1–11	2–11	2–3	6–13	3–3	—	0–6
SKN FC	8–1	6–3	5–5	3–2	2–1	4–2	4–3	—

Updated to match(es) played on 21 March 2021. Source: Bolalob
Legend: Blue = home team win; Yellow = draw; Red = away team win.
For upcoming matches, an "a" indicates there is an article about the rivalry between the two participants.

== Final season ==
Final season will be played on 27 and 28 March 2021.

- All matches will be played in Yogyakarta.
- All times listed are UTC+7

Semi-finals
27 March
Black Steel	3
Bintang Timur	2
27 March
SKN FC	9
Vamos FC	2

Final
28 March
Black Steel	6
SKN FC	2
Third place
28 March
Bintang Timur	9
Vamos FC	4

=== Semi-final ===
27 March 2021
11:30

Black Steel	3–2	Bintang Timur
Evan 3', 27'; da Cunha 35'	Report	Subhan 8', 14'

GOR Universitas Negeri Yogyakarta, Yogyakarta
27 March 2021
14:30

SKN FC	9–2	Vamos FC
Aditya 4', 9'; Sanjaya 10'; Yusuf 11', 34'; Ahmad 12'; Raka 18'; Dewa 19'; Rio 23'	Report	Dennis 5'; Marvin 24'

GOR Universitas Negeri Yogyakarta, Yogyakarta

=== Third place match ===
28 March 2021
11:00

Bintang Timur	9–4	Vamos FC
Anza 6', 39'; Friski 7', 24'; Andri 11', 20'; Subhan 21'; Raka 28'; Mossaoui 30'; Syauqi 34'	Report	Ari 15'; Marvin 20'; Nandi 33'; Dennis 34'

GOR Universitas Negeri Yogyakarta, Yogyakarta

=== Final ===
28 March 2021
14:00

Black Steel	6–2	SKN FC
Evan 9', 18', 28'; Yoseph 16'; Diego 31'; Marchelino 38'	Report	Cahyo 12', 37'

GOR Universitas Negeri Yogyakarta, Yogyakarta

== Season statistics ==
As of matches played on 8 March 2020.

=== Scoring ===
==== Top goalscorers ====
Rank	Player	Team	Goals
1	(Indonesia) Andri Kustiawan	Bintang Timur	16
2	(Indonesia) Evan Soumilena	Blacksteel	14
3	(Indonesia) Fhandy Permana	MAS Young Rior	12
3	(Indonesia) Samuel Eko	SKN FC	12
3	(Indonesia) Vahid Shafiei	Cosmo Futsal	12
6	(Indonesia) Rama Redoni	Kancil BBK	11
7	(Indonesia) Dennis Guna Bawana	Vamos FC	10
7	(Brazil) Diego Rodrigo Menezes	Blacksteel	10
7	(Indonesia) Iqbal Aliefian	Vamos FC	10
10	(Indonesia) Efrinaldi	Giga FC	9
10	(Indonesia) Fahrudin Puji	Futsal 35/Mutiara FC	9
10	(Indonesia) Rizky Permana	Red Manguni	9
13	(Indonesia) Ardiansyah Runtuboy	Bintang Timur	8
13	(Netherlands) Karim Mossaoui	Bintang Timur	8
13	(Indonesia) Rahmat Widyanto	Halus FC	8
13	(Indonesia) Sauqy Saud	Bintang Timur	8
17	(Indonesia) Alfajri Zikri	Vamos FC	7
17	(Indonesia) Ardiansyah Nur	Blacksteel	7
17	(Indonesia) Guntur Sulistyo	SKN FC	7
17	(Indonesia) Reza Gunawan	Cosmo Futsal	7
17	(Indonesia) Subhan Faidasa	Bintang Timur	7
17	(Indonesia) Syahril Rianto	Kancil BBK	7

1 own goal

- (Indonesia) Angga Sidik (Mutiara FC, against Cosmo Futsal on matchday 3rd)
- (Indonesia) Radyan Ferdiansyah (Futsal 35, against BJL 2000 on matchday 5th)
- (Indonesia) Febriand Alfindrio (Halus FC, against Giga FC on matchday 6th)
- (Indonesia) Petrus Alvarez (Red Manguni, against Bintang Timur on matchday 6th)
- (Indonesia) Afif Rizky (Halus FC, against Blacksteel on matchday 7th)
- (Indonesia) Anzar (Vamos FC, against Futsal 35 on matchday 8th)
- (Indonesia) Diaz Riansyah (Kancil BBK, against SKN FC on matchday 8th)
- (Indonesia) Ikrima Nofiansyah (Blacksteel, against BJL 2000 on matchday 10th)
- (Indonesia) Muhammad Jumadil Muzaik (Bank Sumut, against Kancil BBK on matchday 12th)
- (Indonesia) Rama Ramdhani (Red Manguni, against SKN FC Kebumen on matchday 12th)

==== Top assists ====
Rank	Player	Team	Assists
1	(Iran) Alireza Rafieipour	SKN FC	9
2	(Indonesia) Ardiansyah Nur	Blacksteel	8
2	(Indonesia) Ardiansyah Runtuboy	Bintang Timur	8
4	(Indonesia) Alfajri Zikri	Red Manguni	6
4	(Indonesia) Muhammad Iqbal Iskandar	Bintang Timur	6
4	(Indonesia) Rama Ramdhani	Red Manguni	6
8	(Indonesia) Rahmat Arsyad	MAS Young Rior	5
8	(Indonesia) Rio Pangestu	SKN FC	5
8	(Indonesia) Sauqy Saud Lubis	Bintang Timur	5
7	(Indonesia) Abdul Rahman Nawawi	Halus FC	4
7	(Indonesia) Achmad Alfyanto	Cosmo Futsal	4
7	(Indonesia) Farhan Rizky	Halus FC	4
7	(Indonesia) Guntur Sulistyo	SKN FC	4
7	(Brazil) Henrique Da Cunha	Blacksteel	4
7	(Indonesia) Muhammad Hardadi	Kancil BBK	4
7	(Indonesia) Sunny Rizky Suhendra	Bintang Timur	4

==== Hat-tricks ====
Player	For	Against	Result (W/L)	Date	Ref
(Indonesia) Abdul Rahman Nawawi	Halus FC	Futsal 35	7–2 (W)	7 December 2019	
(Indonesia) Ardiansyah Nur	Blacksteel	Jeck Kato 86	6–2 (W)	8 December 2019	
(Indonesia) Andri Kustiawan^{4}	Bintang Timur	Bank Sumut	6–0 (W)	14 December 2019	
(Indonesia) Samuel Eko^{4}	SKN FC	Bank Sumut	0–5 (W)	15 December 2019	
(Indonesia) Rama Redoni	Kancil BBK	Red Meguni	13–6 (W)	15 December 2019	
(Indonesia) Syahril Rianto^{4}	Kancil BBK	Red Meguni	13–6 (W)	15 December 2019	
(Indonesia) Rizky Permana	Red Meguni	Kancil BBK	13–6 (L)	15 December 2019	
(Brazil) Diego Rodrigo Menezes	Blacksteel	Futsal 35	2–6 (W)	5 January 2020	
(Indonesia) Guntur Sulistyo	SKN FC	Cosmo Futsal	7–3 (W)	12 January 2020	
(Indonesia) Fahrudin Puji	Mutiara FC	Red Manguni	5–3 (W)	12 January 2020	
(Indonesia) Dennis Guna Bawana	Vamos FC	Halus FC	9–1 (W)	18 January 2020	
(Indonesia) Bayu Aditya	Jeck Kato 86	Futsal 35	1–4 (W)	19 January 2020	
(Indonesia) Subhan Faidasa	Bintang Timur	Red Manguni	1–11 (W)	26 January 2020	
(Indonesia) Marchelino Waroy	Red Manguni	Bank Sumut	6–3 (W)	9 February 2020	
(Indonesia) Muhammad Rifai	IPC Pelindo II	Mutiara FC	1–5 (W)	9 February 2020	
(Indonesia) Evan Soumilena	Blacksteel	MAS Young Rior	3–6 (W)	15 February 2020	
(Indonesia) Andri Kustiawan	Bintang Timur	Red Manguni	6–1 (W)	22 February 2020	
(Indonesia) Evan Soumilena	Blacksteel	Futsal 35	8–1 (W)	29 February 2020	
(Indonesia) Randhyas Samsul Bachri	Jeck Kato 86	MAS Young Rior	8–6 (W)	1 March 2020	
(Indonesia) Fhandy Permana	MAS Young Rior	Jeck Kato 86	8–6 (L)	1 March 2020	
(Iran) Vahid Shafiei	Cosmo Futsal	Red Manguni	2–11 (W)	8 March 2020	
(Indonesia) Reza Gunawan	Cosmo Futsal	Red Manguni	2–11 (W)	7 March 2020	
(Indonesia) Andri Kustiawan^{4}	Bintang Timur	Bank Sumut	2–5 (W)	7 March 2020	

Notes

^{4} Player scored 4 goals
