= IFL Super League =

- Founded: 2006
- Country: Indonesia
- Confederation: AFC
- Number of clubs: 10
- Level on pyramid: 1
- Relegation to: Premier Division
- Domestic cup: • Indonesia Futsal National Cup • Indonesia Futsal Super Cup
- International cup: AFC Futsal Club Championship AFF Futsal Club Championship
- Current champions: Bintang Timur Surabaya FC (4th title) (2024-25)
- Most championships: Bintang Timur Surabaya FC (4 times)
- Website: http://www.pssi-football.com
- Current: 2025-26

Pro Futsal League Indonesia (Indonesian: Liga Futsal Profesional Indonesia) is the official main competition for professional futsal clubs in Indonesia. It is organized by PSSI (Football Association of Indonesia).

== Participating clubs in 2011 ==
- Electric PLN (Jakarta)
- Pelindo II (Jakarta)
- Limus IBM Jaya (West Java)
- Futsal Kota Bandung (West Java)
- Jatim Futsal (Surabaya)
- Bank Sumut FC (North Sumatra)
- Harimau Rawa (Riau)
- Sriwijaya United FC (South Sumatra)
- JICT Jakarta (Jakarta)
- Jaya Kencana United (South Tangerang)
- Green House Solo (Central Java)

* = It is a club that comes after PT. Sriwijaya Optimistic Mandiri (parent company of the ISL club Sriwijaya FC) to purchase a license from the club Isen Mulang (Central Kalimantan).
