= 2011 F-League =

1st season of the F-League

F-League
- Season: 2011
- Matches played: 48
- Goals scored: 389 (8.1 per match)
- Biggest home win: Inner City 12–1 Boomerangs
- Biggest away win: Parramatta Blues 4–12 Dural Warriors
- Highest scoring: Parramatta Blues 4–12 Dural Warriors

The 2011 F-League was the first season of the F-League, the top Australian professional league for futsal clubs.

== Teams ==
Six teams competed in the league.

- Boomerangs
- Dural Warriors
- Inner City
- Maccabi Hakoah
- Parramatta Blues
- St Albans Strikers

== League table ==
Pos	Team	Pld	W	D	L	GF	GA	GD	Pts	Qualification or relegation
1	Maccabi Hakoah	17	10	3	4	59	46	+13	33	Qualification to the 2011 F-League Finals series.
2	Inner City	16	10	1	5	78	46	+32	31	Qualification to the 2011 F-League Finals series.
3	Dural Warriors	16	9	2	5	74	61	+13	29	Qualification to the 2011 F-League Finals series.
4	St Albans Strikers	17	8	0	9	71	79	−8	24	Qualification to the 2011 F-League Finals series.
5	Parramatta Blues	15	5	2	8	46	63	−17	17	
6	Boomerangs	15	1	2	12	61	94	−33	5	

Updated to match(es) played on completed results. Source: SportsTG
Rules for classification: 1) Points; 2) Goal difference; 3) Goals scored

== Results ==
=== Regular season ===
Home \ Away	BFS	DUR	INN	MAC	PAR	SAS	BFS	DUR	INN	MAC	PAR	SAS
Boomerangs	—	5–5	3–8	6–7	4–5	5–6	—	6–4				
Dural Warriors	5–4	—	1–6		4–0	6–4		—		5–4		
Inner City	4–3	2–4	—	3–1	5–2		12–1	3–2	—		0–2	
Maccabi Hakoah	4–3	3–5	3–3	—	3–1	4–3	6–1	3–2	3–2	—	2–2	1–3
Parramatta Blues	7–4	4–12	3–6	3–1	—	3–2	5–5	5–6			—	2–3
St Albans Strikers	7–5	4–7	3–9	1–4	6–2	—	9–6	3–5	8–6	2–5		—

Updated to match(es) played on unknown. Source: SportsTG
Legend: Blue = home team win; Yellow = draw; Red = away team win.

=== Semi-finals ===
24 July 2011	Inner City	4–5	St Albans Strikers	Sydney
13:00		Report		Stadium: Menai Indoor Sports Centre

24 July 2011	Dural Warriors	1–3	Maccabi Hakoah	Sydney
14:20		Report		Stadium: Menai Indoor Sports Centre

=== Grand Final ===
25 July 2011	Maccabi Hakoah	5–2	St Albans Strikers	Sydney
16:20		Report		Stadium: Menai Indoor Sports Centre
