= F-League =

- Founded: 2011
- Folded: 2017
- Country: Australia
- Confederation: AFC (Asia)
- Number of clubs: 8
- International cup(s): AFC Futsal Club Championship; AFF Futsal Club Championship
- Last champions: East Coast Heat
- Current premiers: Vic Vipers
- Most championships: Dural Warriors; East Coast Heat (2 titles each)
- Most premierships: Vic Vipers (3 titles)
- Website: thefleague.com.au

The F-League was a futsal league endorsed and supported by Football Federation Australia and administered by Football NSW. As Australia's only endorsed national competition played under full FIFA laws of the game, it was considered the highest level of futsal in Australia.

The F-League was established in 2011 as a multi-weekend tournament in Sydney and grew into an eight-team competition played over a hybrid home and away format. Seasons ran from May to August with teams playing each other twice before contesting a Championship Series over a final weekend in Sydney.

Like other Australian sporting codes the winner of the regular season tournament was dubbed 'Premier' and the winner of the grand final was 'Champion'. A Championship Series was played each year with the exception of the 2012 season. From the 2012 season onward the competition was played under full FIFA laws of the game and the Premier was eligible to represent Australia at the AFC Futsal Club Championship. Since 2015 the Champion was also eligible to represent Australia at the AFF Futsal Club Championship.

Since the league's formation in 2011 there have been three Premiers and four Champions. A total of 17 clubs have participated in the competition from the Australian Capital Territory, New South Wales, Queensland and Victoria.

The competition was disbanded in 2017 due to Football NSW not receiving "the required number of applications to deliver a viable competition consistent with the standards set in previous seasons".

== History ==
=== Origins ===
Australia had not had a national futsal competition since the National Indoor Soccer League of the early 1990s which had enjoyed large crowds, sponsorship and television coverage. Despite this Australian futsal continued to grow through state-based competitions and the National Futsal Championships which were held annually. Australia continued to compete internationally as the dominant nation in the Oceania Football Confederation however failed to qualify for the 2008 FIFA Futsal World Cup in Brazil with their qualification path made more challenging by a switch to the Asian Football Confederation in 2006.

Stakeholders agreed an increased level of competition would assist Australian players competing in Asia and discussions of a national competition continued among State Federations. In 2010 Sydney based club Dural Warriors hosted an invitational weekend involving St Albans Strikers and Bayside Pirates from Victoria, Boomerangs F.S. from the ACT and NSW Futsal Premier League Champion Campbelltown City Quake. Matches were played by both men's and women's teams and were played under full FIFA laws of the game. Talks continued among the participating clubs towards the establishment of a league in 2011.

=== Inaugural season ===
The F-League began in 2011 as a six-team competition with teams from New South Wales, the Australian Capital Territory and Victoria participating across three weekends in Sydney. Boomerangs FS (ACT), Dural Warriors (NSW), Maccabi Hakoah (NSW), Parramatta Blues (NSW), Inner City FC (VIC) and St Albans Strikers (VIC) were the foundation clubs of the league. The competition was closely modeled on the New Zealand National Futsal League making use of the same weekend series format and was administered and supported by Football NSW.

The competition was considered a success with positive feedback from teams from each state that participated. Sydney based Maccabi Hakoah won the inaugural Premiership and Championship titles defeating St Albans Strikers in the grand final.

=== Expanded competition ===
In 2012 the renamed hummel F-League (for sponsorship reasons) expanded to an eight-team competition with teams again from New South Wales, Australian Capital Territory and Victoria. The competition was played across five weekends; three in Sydney, two in Melbourne and one in Canberra. For the first time the competition was played under full FIFA laws of the game and it was announced the winner would qualify as Australia's representative at the AFC Futsal Club Championship.

Foundation clubs Maccabi Hakoah and Inner City FC left the competition after one year and were replaced by East Coast Heat, Vic Vipers and Jaguars FSC, bringing Victorian representation for four out of the league's eight teams. The opening weekend saw the first F-League matches played in Melbourne with Vic Vipers and Jaguars FSC playing the first match of the 2012 season. Dural Warriors won the Premiership having gone the entire season undefeated. 2012 was the only year the competition did not play a Championship Series.

The 2012 season also coincided with Australia's qualification for the 2012 FIFA Futsal World Cup in Thailand. Thirteen of the 16 members of the Futsalroos team that competed in the 2012 FIFA Futsal World Cup played in the 2012 hummel F-League.

The 2013 season saw the same series format played in Sydney, Melbourne and Canberra with the addition of a top four Championship Series consisting of two semi finals and a grand final played at the end of the fifth weekend of competition. For the first time Friday night fixtures were introduced over a number of the rounds to give the competition additional exposure and provide clubs with more beneficial playing times.

Another foundation club, Parramatta Blues, withdrew from the competition and were replaced by Sydney Scorpions, who played their first match on the opening night of the league, defeating East Coast Heat. Vic Vipers won both the Premiership and Championship, defeating defending Premiers Dural Warriors 4–0 in the grand final at Dural Sports and Leisure centre in Sydney.

On 7 March 2017, Football NSW announced that the 2017 F-League season (for both men and women) would not be proceeding due to lack of sufficient numbers of applications to participate. It remains unclear as to how clubs will be able to qualify to play in AFC competitions in 2017 and beyond.

=== Hybrid home and away format ===
2014 saw a large change to the competition format introducing a hybrid home and away system with one to three matches played per weekend. This resulted in the competition running for consecutive weeks with fixtures spread more widely across the season allowing for more regular matches.

For the first time a team from Queensland, South Brisbane Futsal Club, entered the competition providing the league full representation of the eastern seaboard and Capital FC became the ACT's second representative. Both Jaguars FSC and Melbourne Heart left the competition in 2014 reducing the Victorian representation to two teams. Dural Warriors regained the Premiership, becoming the first club to win it twice and won their first Championship series in 2014, defeating East Coast Heat in the grand final at Valentine Sports Park in Sydney.

The same system was retained for 2015 with Galaxy F.C., Bayside Pirates and Inner West Magic joining the competition replacing the outgoing Sydney Scorpions. Vic Vipers won their second Premiership while in a rematch of the 2014 grand final East Coast Heat defeated Dural Warriors to win their first Championship.

=== Disbandment ===
On 7 March 2017, Football NSW announced that the 2017 F-League season (for both men and women) would not be proceeding due to lack of sufficient numbers of applications to participate.

== Competition format ==
The competition has retained its hybrid home and away format for the 2016 season which was introduced in 2014. The current format allows clubs the flexibility to host fixtures at times which best suit logistical considerations while reducing costs for the traveling teams.

The regular season consists of 14 weekends of fixtures where clubs play between one and three matches across Friday, Saturday and Sunday dependent on travel arrangements.

== Clubs ==
In 2016 the F-League was contested by eight teams: Two from the ACT, three from New South Wales, two from Queensland and one from Victoria. A total of seventeen clubs have competed at some point in the league's short history. Only two of the competitions foundation clubs, Dural Warriors and Boomerangs F.S. have remained since 2011.

The F-League comprises a single division and has no system for promotion or relegation of clubs. The teams operate on a license based system which they apply to the competition's administrator Football NSW on an annual basis.

=== 2016 season ===
Club	Location	Home Ground	Founded	Joined	Head Coach
Boomerangs F.S.	Canberra, Australian Capital Territory	Mpowerdome	2008	2011	(Australia) Kristian Collins
North Canberra Untouchables FC	Canberra, Australian Capital Territory	AIS Training Halls	2003	2016	(Australia) Bill Simeonovic
Dural Warriors	Sydney, New South Wales	Dural Sport and Leisure Centre	1994	2011	(Australia) Rob Varela
East Coast Heat	Sydney, New South Wales	Valentine Sports Park	2012	2012	(Australia) Jamie Amendolia
Galaxy FC	Gold Coast, Queensland	Logan Metro Indoor Sports Centre	2014	2015	(Brazil) Bruno Cannavan
Inner West Magic	Sydney, New South Wales	Valentine Sports Park	2003	2015	(Australia) Steven Knight
South Brisbane Futsal Club	Brisbane, Queensland	Eagles Sports Complex	2013	2014	(Brazil) Felipe Amorim
Vic Vipers	(Victoria (state)) Melbourne, Victoria	Victoria Futsal Centre	1999	2012	(Australia) Milton Sakkos

=== Former clubs ===
Club	Location	Seasons	Head Coach
Capital FC	Canberra, Australian Capital Territory	2014-2015	(Australia) Bill Simeonovic
Sydney Scorpions	Sydney, New South Wales	2013-2014	(Australia) Glenn Lockhart
Maccabi Hakoah	Sydney, New South Wales	2011	(Australia) Steven Knight
Parramatta Blues	Sydney, New South Wales	2011-2012	(Australia) Steven Lubric
Melbourne Heart	(Victoria (state)) Melbourne, Victoria	2012-2013	(Australia) Edgard Vatcky
Inner City FC	(Victoria (state)) Melbourne, Victoria	2011	(Australia) Paul Vidic
Jaguars FSC	(Victoria (state)) Melbourne, Victoria	2012-2013	(Australia) Jack Dugonjic
St. Albans Strikers FC	(Victoria (state)) Melbourne, Victoria	2011-2014	(Australia) Rob Lakovski
Bayside Pirates	(Victoria (state)) Melbourne, Victoria	2015	(Australia) Mark Georgeson

== Champions and Premiers ==
Season	Champions	Premiers
2011	Maccabi Hakoah	Inner City
2012	Dural Warriors	Dural Warriors
2013	Vic Vipers	Vic Vipers
2014	Dural Warriors	Dural Warriors
2015	East Coast Heat	Vic Vipers
2016	East Coast Heat	Vic Vipers
2017	No competition	

== Women's F-League ==
A six team women's F-League was established in 2013 under a similar format as the men's competition. In 2014 the women's competition adopted use of full FIFA laws of the game and fixtures were aligned with the hybrid home and away format of the men's competition. Currently seven teams contest the women's F-League; Boomerangs F.S., North Canberra Untouchables FC, Dural Warriors, East Coast Heat, South Brisbane Futsal Club, Vic Vipers and Bayside Pirates.

The winner of the 2015 Championship represented Australia at the AFF Futsal Club Championship.

2015 saw both the Men's and Women's Competitions increase to nine and seven teams respectively, including teams from NSW, ACT, VIC and QLD again competing in the hybrid home and away style of competition.

For 2016 there were eight Men's and eight Women's teams playing under the same format of competition as was seen in 2015, with teams again from NSW, ACT, VIC and QLD.

Women's Competition current Champions Galaxy FC (QLD)

Galaxy FC: Trudy Bartlett, Georgina Bridges, Mackenzie Douglas, Brooke Skelly, Jessica Dillon, Ashleigh Bucknall, Nichole Laws, Charlotte Boyes, Mariel Hecher, Lorena Maggio, Noran Abaza, Gabrielle Marzano, Joanne Burgess, Alisha Foote, coach Vinicius de Oliveira, assistant Barry McErlan, assistant Vinicius de Carvalho Leite, manager Armando Cacace, manager Andrew Parkes

2016 Women's Competition Clubs

Boomerangs FS (ACT)

North Canberra Untouchables (ACT)

Dural Warriors (NSW)

East Coast Heat (NSW)

Galaxy FC (QLD)

South Brisbane FC (QLD)

Bayside Pirates (VIC)

Vic Vipers (VIC)

On 7 March 2017, Football NSW announced that the 2017 F-League season (for both men and women) would not be proceeding due to lack of sufficient numbers of applications to participate.
