= AFF Futsal Club Championship =

Futsal tournament

- Organiser(s): AFF
- Founded: 2014; 12 years ago
- Region: Southeast Asia
- Current champions: (Indonesia) Black Steel Papua (men) (1 title) (Indonesia) Jaya Kencana Angels (women) (1 title)
- Most championships: (Thailand) Port (men) (3 titles) (Vietnam) Thái Sơn Nam (women) (2 titles)
- Website: Official website

The AFF Futsal Club Championship (formerly the AFF Futsal Cup) is the Southeast Asian futsal club competition hosted by the ASEAN Football Federation (AFF).

In May 2019, the AFF decided to change the name of the competition from AFF Futsal Club Championship into the AFF Futsal Cup. AFF Futsal Club Championship is the second-biggest futsal club competition in Asia behind AFC Futsal Club Championship.

== Summary ==
=== Men's ===
Year	Host	Final			Third place match
Year	Host	Champion	Score	Second place	Third place	Score	Fourth place
2014; Details	(Indonesia); Jakarta	(Indonesia); IPC Pelindo	Round-robin	(Malaysia); Felda United	(Vietnam); Hài Phương Nam	Round-robin	(Indonesia); Libido
2015; Details	(Thailand); Bangkok	(Thailand); Port	5–0	(Malaysia); Felda United	(Myanmar); MIC	4–2	(Australia); East Coast Heat
2016; Details	(Myanmar); Naypyidaw	(Thailand); Port	4–3	(Vietnam); Thái Sơn Nam	(Myanmar); MIC	7–5	(Indonesia); Black Steel Manokwari
2017; Details	(Thailand); Bangkok	(Thailand); Port	4–0	(Vietnam); Sanna Khánh Hòa	(Malaysia); Melaka United	4–2	(Indonesia); Permata Indah Manokwari
2018; Details	(Indonesia); Yogyakarta	(Thailand); Bangkok BTS	7–1	(Australia); East Coast Heat	(Myanmar); MIC	3–3 aet. (11−10) pen.	(Indonesia); SKN Kebumen
2019; Details	(Thailand); Nakhon Ratchasima	(Thailand); Chonburi Bluewave	9–1	(Vietnam) Sanatech Khánh Hòa	(Myanmar); MIC	9–5	(Cambodia); Down Town Sport
2021; Details	(Thailand); Nakhon Ratchasima	(Thailand); Chonburi Bluewave	Round-robin	(Thailand); Port	(Malaysia); Selangor MAC	Round-robin	(Malaysia); Pahang Rangers
2022; Details	(Thailand); Nakhon Ratchasima	(Indonesia); Bintang Timur Surabaya	4–2	(Thailand); Hongyen Thakam	(Malaysia); Selangor MAC	2–2 aet. (8–7) pen.	(Vietnam); Sahako
2023; Details	(Thailand); Nakhon Ratchasima	(Indonesia); Black Steel Papua	1–1 aet. (4–3) pen.	(Thailand); Hongyen Thakam	(Vietnam); Thái Sơn Nam	3–0	(Malaysia); Pahang Rangers

=== Medals by nation ===
Rank	Nation	Gold	Silver	Bronze	Total
1	Thailand (THA)	6	3	0	9
2	Indonesia (IDN)	3	0	0	3
3	Vietnam (VIE)	0	3	2	5
4	Malaysia (MAS)	0	2	3	5
5	Australia (AUS)	0	1	0	1
6	Myanmar (MYA)	0	0	4	4
Totals (6 entries)		9	9	9	27

=== Women's ===
Year	Host	Final			Third place match
Year	Host	Champion	Score	Second place	Third place	Score	Fourth place
2014; Details	(Indonesia); Jakarta	(Vietnam); Thái Sơn Nam	Round-robin	(Indonesia); UNJ	(Indonesia); UPI	Round-robin	(Malaysia); Felda United
2015; Details	(Thailand); Bangkok	(Vietnam); Thái Sơn Nam	3–1	(Australia); Dural Warriors	(Thailand); BG-College of Asian Scholars	4–3	(Malaysia); Felda United
2016; Details	(Myanmar); Naypyidaw	(Indonesia); Jaya Kencana Angels	2–2 aet (5−4) pen.	(Thailand); Khon Kaen	(Vietnam); Thái Sơn Nam	3–2	(Thailand); Bangkok

=== Medals by nation ===
Rank	Nation	Gold	Silver	Bronze	Total
1	Vietnam (VIE)	2	0	1	3
2	Indonesia (IDN)	1	1	1	3
3	Thailand (THA)	0	1	1	2
4	Australia (AUS)	0	1	0	1
Totals (4 entries)		3	3	3	9

== All medals by nation ==
Rank	Nation	Gold	Silver	Bronze	Total
1	Thailand (THA)	6	4	1	11
2	Indonesia (IDN)	4	1	1	6
3	Vietnam (VIE)	2	3	3	8
4	Malaysia (MAS)	0	2	3	5
5	Australia (AUS)	0	2	0	2
6	Myanmar (MYA)	0	0	4	4
Totals (6 entries)		12	12	12	36
