= Bangkok Arena =

Sports venue in Bangkok, Thailand

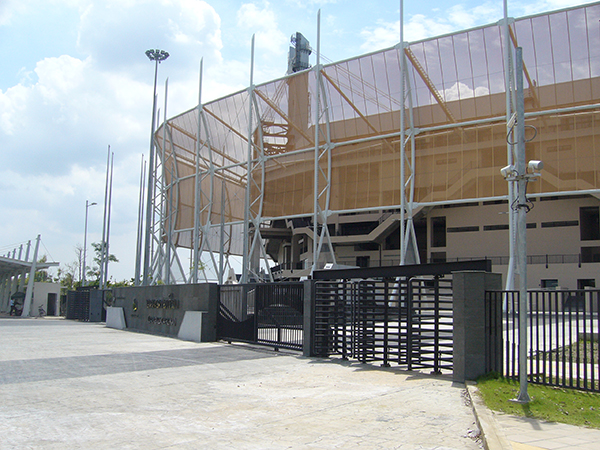
- Interactive map of Bangkok Arena
- Former names: Bangkok Futsal Arena
- Location: Nong Chok, Bangkok, Thailand
- Coordinates: 13.8338°N 100.8520°E
- Owner: Bangkok Metropolitan Administration (BMA)
- Operator: Bangkok Metropolitan Administration (BMA)
- Capacity: 12,000
- Field size: 116*132 m.

Construction
- Groundbreaking: 24 January 2012
- Built: January 2012
- Opened: 2015; 11 years ago
- Architect: King Mongkut's University of Technology Thonburi
- Project manager: Bangkok Metropolitan Administration (BMA)
- Main contractor: EMC Public Company Limited

Tenants
- 2015 AFF Futsal Championship; 2016 AFC Futsal Club Championship; 2017 AFC U-20 Futsal Championship; 2017 AFF Futsal Club Championship; 2018 AFC Women's Futsal Championship; 2019 AFC Futsal Club Championship; 2023 Teqball World Championships; 2024 AFC Futsal Asian Cup

Bangkok Arena (Thai: บางกอกอารีนา, pronounced [bāːŋ.kɔ̀ːk ʔāː.rīː.nâː]), formerly named Bangkok Futsal Arena (บางกอกฟุตซอลอารีนา), is an indoor sporting arena, located in Nong Chok District of Bangkok, Thailand. The capacity of the arena is 12,000 spectators and the construction of the arena was scheduled to be finished in 2012 for the 2012 FIFA Futsal World Cup but construction did not finish in time because of 2011 Thailand floods. The Arena was finally opened in 2015, in time for the 2015 AFF Futsal Championship. Expected uses include concerts, basketball, futsal and volleyball.

== History ==
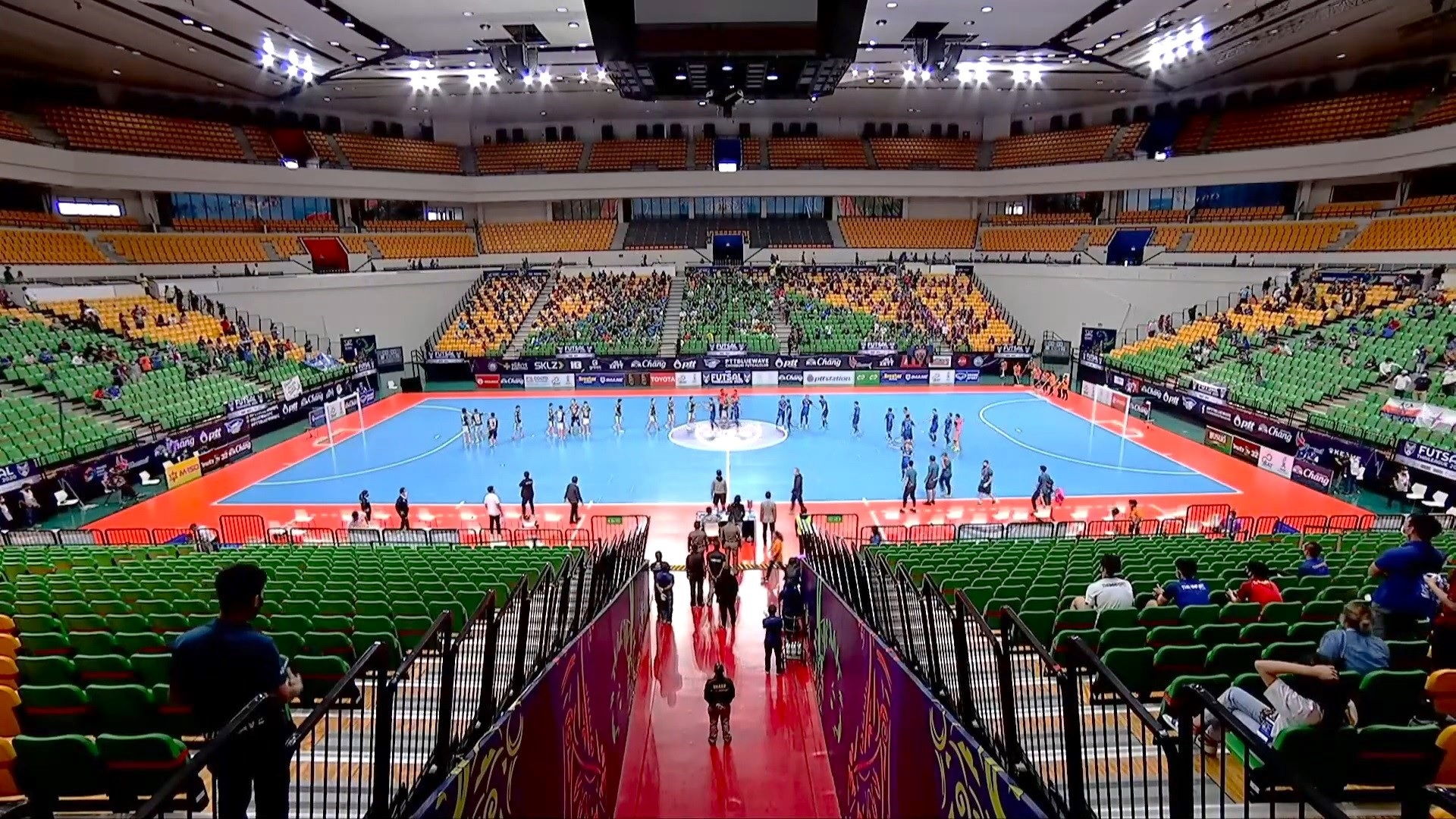
The arena hosting Futsal Thai League 2020

International Federation of Association Football resolved Thailand to host 2012 FIFA Futsal World Cup on 18 March 2010 which the Ministry of Tourism and Sports is responsible for the overall. Later in August of the same year Football Association of Thailand propose alternatives to the main course used for competition to meet the conditions set by FIFA that audience capacity 10,000-15,000 people to the Abhisit Government in three forms are construction of a new stadium by choosing from two areas including the land of the State Railway of Thailand and land at the Bangkok Civil Service Training Center in Nong Chok District another is renovation of Indoor Stadium Huamark and Nimibutr Stadium with the conclusion that To use the Bangkok Civil Service Training Center is the construction site. In May 2011, the Abhisit Government approved the budget for the construction of this stadium amounting to 1,239 million baht in which Bangkok has assigned King Mongkut's University of Technology Thonburi is the designer including studying the use of field areas and signed the contract to EMC Public Company Limited on 13 January 2012 with Bangkok Governor Sukhumbhand Paribatra informing FIFA requires that this stadium be named Bangkok Futsal Arena.

Subsequently, Bangkok Metropolitan Administration organized an event to officially open the field on 11 November 2012 while changing the name to Bangkok Arena.

== Arena details ==
The stadium is an indoor stadium style designed to be versatile To be able to apply the field in other activities. Later, the stadium is 116 meters wide, 132 meters long, 5-level amphitheater, 25 meters high (roof 34 meters high) with a capacity of 12,000 spectators. The building has a size of 10 rai, with a total usable area of approximately 30,000 square meters. Structural design of the field Using a steel cable rod length of 132 meters to pull the steel roof frame. Weighing about 3,000 tons.

Architectural features was the blossoms are the beginning of architectural concepts with the pillars and roof framing of Kranok pattern by combining the patterns of the blossoms.
