= 2021 AFF Futsal Cup =

AFF Futsal Cup 2021
เอเอฟเอฟ ฟุตซอล คัพ 2021

Tournament details
- Host country: Thailand
- City: Nakhon Ratchasima
- Dates: 13–17 September
- Teams: 5 (from 1 sub-confederation)
- Venue(s): 1 (in 1 host city)

Final positions
- Champions: (Thailand) FreeFire Bluewave Chonburi (2nd title)
- Runners-up: (Thailand) Port
- Third place: (Malaysia) Selangor MAC

Tournament statistics
- Matches played: 10
- Top scorer(s): (Thailand) Supakorn Sangom (FreeFire Bluewave Chonburi)
- Best player(s): (Brazil) Marcos Vinicius (Port)
- Fair play award: (Malaysia) Pahang Rangers

The 2021 AFF Futsal Cup was the sixth edition of AFF Futsal Cup. The tournament was held in Nakhon Ratchasima, Thailand from 13 to 17 September 2021.

The defending champion was Chonburi Bluewave and they became champions 2 times in a row.

== Participants ==
- (Thailand) FreeFire Bluewave Chonburi (Host)
- (Thailand) Port (Host)
- (Malaysia) Pahang Rangers
- (Malaysia) Selangor MAC
- (Cambodia) Mohahang All Star

== Venue ==
- Terminal 21 Hall Nakhon Rachasima, Thailand

== Standing ==
Pos	Team	Pld	W	D	L	GF	GA	GD	Pts	Result
1	(Thailand) FreeFire Bluewave Chonburi (C)	4	3	1	0	21	5	+16	10	Champion
2	(Thailand) Port	4	3	1	0	15	3	+12	10	Runner-Up
3	(Malaysia) Selangor MAC	4	2	0	2	12	10	+2	6	Third place
4	(Malaysia) Pahang Rangers	4	1	0	3	14	19	−5	3	
5	(Cambodia) Mohahang All Star	4	0	0	4	5	30	−25	0	

Source: AFF
(C) Champions

=== Match ===
13 September 2021
14:00

(Thailand) FreeFire Bluewave Chonburi	3–0	(Malaysia) Selangor MAC

Terminal 21 Hall, Nakhon Rachasima
13 September 2021
18:00

(Thailand) Port	2–0	(Malaysia) Pahang Rangers

Terminal 21 Hall, Nakhon Rachasima
14 September 2021
14:00

(Malaysia) Pahang Rangers	1–5	(Malaysia) Selangor MAC

Terminal 21 Hall, Nakhon Rachasima
14 September 2021
18:00

(Thailand) FreeFire Bluewave Chonburi	5–1	(Cambodia) Mohahang All Star

Terminal 21 Hall, Nakhon Rachasima
15 September 2021
14:00

(Cambodia) Mohahang All Star	2–12	(Malaysia) Pahang Rangers

Terminal 21 Hall, Nakhon Rachasima
15 September 2021
18:00

(Thailand) Port	4–0	(Malaysia) Selangor MAC

Terminal 21 Hall, Nakhon Rachasima
16 September 2021
14:00

(Thailand) FreeFire Bluewave Chonburi	10–1	(Malaysia) Pahang Rangers

Terminal 21 Hall, Nakhon Rachasima
16 September 2021
18:00

(Thailand) Port	6–0	(Cambodia) Mohahang All Star

Terminal 21 Hall, Nakhon Rachasima
17 September 2021
14:00

(Malaysia) Selangor MAC	7–2	(Cambodia) Mohahang All Star

Terminal 21 Hall, Nakhon Rachasima
17 September 2021
18:00

(Thailand) Port	3–3	(Thailand) FreeFire Bluewave Chonburi

Terminal 21 Hall, Nakhon Rachasima

== Winner ==
2021 AFF Futsal Cup Winner
(Thailand)
FreeFire Bluewave Chonburi
Second title
