= Boomerangs F.S. =

Boomerangs FS
- Full name: Boomerangs FS
- Founded: 2008
- Ground: AIS
- Capacity: 200
- President: Kristian Collins
- League: F-League
- Website: http://www.boomerangsfs.com

Boomerangs FS is an FFA Accredited Australian Futsal club based in Canberra, ACT. The Boomerangs play in a number of elite leagues including the ACT Premier League, the NSW Premier League and previously in the national F-League which is the top tier of Australian Futsal.

== ACT Premier League ==
The Boomerangs enters men's, women's and junior teams into the Capital Football ACT Futsal Premier League each season.

== NSW Futsal Leagues ==
Boomerangs FS played its first year of elite futsal in the Football NSW (FNSW) Super League in season 2009/2010. Since then, the club has continuously entered nine competitive teams into various levels of FNSW competition, including Premier League 1 (PL1), Premier League 2 (PL2 and State League.

== FFA Futsal Nationals ==
Boomerangs FS teams represented the Australian Capital Territory (ACT) in January 2015 at the Australian Futsal Nationals held in Sydney. Teams were represented in 12 Boys (2), 14 Boys, 15 Boys, Youth Men (2) and in 12 Girls, 16 Girls and Youth Women. Both the Youth Men and Youth Women qualified for the Grand Finals with the Youth Men defeating NSW Thunder to become National Champions.

In January 2016, the club again represented the ACT at the Futsal Nationals working in collaboration with Capital Football in sending 12 teams to the Championships held in Sydney.

== F-League ==
The Club entered a men's team into the inaugural year of the F-League in 2011, and again competed in that competition in 2012, finishing fourth on the competition table. Boomerangs FS is one of only two teams that has competed in all seasons of the F-League.

In 2013 the Club entered a team in the men's competition, and once again finished in fourth position. A semi-final was played against eventual Grand Final winners Vic Vipers, which the Boomerangs narrowly lost 3–4. The 2014 season saw – for the third season in succession – the men's team again finish fourth, and again be defeated by the eventual Grand Final winners, Dural Warriors in the semi-final.

The Boomerangs also entered a team in the inaugural year of the Women's F-League competition in 2013. The Boomerang's women's team finished second on the league table after fourteen rounds of competition. They won their semi-final over Melbourne Heart, and lost their Grand Final to Sydney Scorpions. In 2014, the Boomerangs women's team finished third on the table and defeated South Brisbane in their semi-final. For the second year in a row they were defeated (this time in a close match 3-2) by the Sydney Scorpions.

The 2015 season saw the Boomerangs again entering teams in both the men's and women's competition. Results for the 2015 season were not up to the level of previous seasons with the men finishing in eighth place and the women in sixth – both teams missing the finals series for the first time since they had been instigated.

The 2016 season saw some improvement in the results on the previous year for both the men's (6th) and women's (5th) teams, however, both remained short of a finals appearance.

The FFA (Football Federation Australia) ceased supporting the national men's and women's F-League in 2017. There has been no indication if it will return in the future, or in what form if it does.

2016 Men's F-League Squad

1. Keiran Stroh (GK) 2. Callum Smith 3. Nathan Megic 4. Daniel Giovinazzo 5. Brad Sawyer 6. Glenn Smith 7. Jason O'Dwyer (C) 9. Robbie Cattanach 11. Jonathan Ciminelli 15. Jake Wilsener 16. Nick Van Aalst (GK) 17. Ben Basser-Silk 18. Zac Sorenson (GK) 19. Ashley Collins 22. Nick Rathjen 23. Michael Rinaudo 26. Chris Smith 98. Elie Darwich

2016 Women's F-League Squad

2. Rachael Corbett 3. Hayley Buckingham 7. Tabitha Metherell 9. Michaela Day (C) 10. Sabrina Spinapolice 12. Alex Martens 14. Olivia Gurney 15. Natalie De Marco 16. Jess Giovinazzo (GK) 17. Kate Deakin 19. Amelia Turner 20. Hayley McLachlan 22. Isobel D'Amico 23. Eleni Haridemos 24. Ineka Voigt 25. Amy Abbey 28. Sonia Pasquariello 31. Ashlyn Garrity 32. Alicia Meuronen 34. Maddie Perceval

== Notable players ==
- Daniel Fulton (Futsalroos representative)
- Angelo Konstantinou (Futsalroos representative)
- George Cattanach (Futsalroos representative)
- Trent Flanigan (Futsalroos representative)
- Callum Smith (Futsalroos representative)

== Notable Coaches ==
- Kristian Collins (AFC Level 2)
- Sam Smith (AFC Level 2)
- Mark Dowling (AFC Level 1)
