= Ortuseight =

Indonesian manufacturing sportsware company

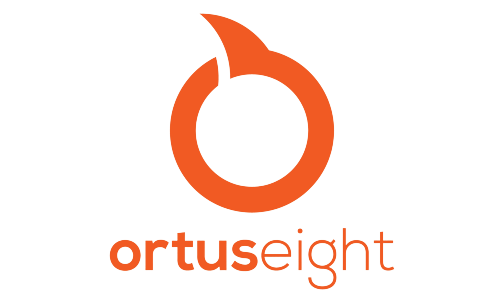
- Type: Limited
- Industry: Apparel; Sportswear; Sports equipment
- Founded: 19 February 2018; 8 years ago
- Founder: Arif Prijadi Wirawan
- Headquarters: Tangerang, Indonesia
- Products: Sneakers; Sports equipment
- Website: ortuseight.id

Ortuseight is an Indonesian sport manufacturing company based in Tangerang, Indonesia and it was established in 2018 which produces sports shoes and jerseys. Ortuseight's company name is PT. Vita Nova Atletik.

== Name ==
ORTUS is taken from the words "Optimism, Resilience, Trust, Upbeat, and Social". Ortus itself means sunrise, dawn, or beginning, and EIGHT is the number of teams that start a company.

== Sponsorship ==
=== Teams ===
==== Club teams ====
- (Indonesia) BJL 2000
- (Indonesia) Cosmo Futsal
- (Indonesia) Halus FC
- (Indonesia) Jeck Kato 86
- (Indonesia) MAS Young Rior
- (Indonesia) Mutiara FC
- (Indonesia) SKN FC Kebumen

=== Athletes ===
==== Futsal ====
- (Indonesia) Andri Kustiawan
- (Indonesia) Ardi Dwi Suwardy
- (Indonesia) Anzar
- (Indonesia) Fachri Reza
- (Indonesia) Samuel Eko
- (Indonesia) Syahidansyah Lubis
- (Indonesia) Muhammad Syaifullah
- (Indonesia) Ramadhan Zidani
- (Indonesia) Muhammad Rizki Xavier
- (Indonesia) Muhammad Iksan Rahadian
- (Indonesia) Hasriyanoor Hanafi
- (Indonesia) Andrei Harmaji
- (Indonesia) Efrinaldi
- (Indonesia) Muhammad Afif Rizky
- (Indonesia) Fhandy Pernama
- (Indonesia) Caisar Octavianus Silitonga
- (Indonesia) Krisna Bramenta
- (Indonesia) Salim Hanafi Sungkar
- (Indonesia) Tely Sarendra
- (Indonesia) Bambang Bayu Saptaji
- (Indonesia) Wahid Setiawan
- (Indonesia) Muhammad Nizar
- (Brazil) Diego Menezes
- (Netherlands) Khalid El Hattach
- (Netherlands) Karim Mossaoui
- (Indonesia) Valentino Vazandy Pim

==== Association football ====
- (Indonesia) Athallah Arraihan
- (Indonesia) Bayu Gatra
- (Indonesia) Beckham Putra
- (Indonesia) Fadil Sausu
- (Indonesia) Gian Zola
- (Indonesia) Rizky Dwi Febrianto
- (Indonesia) Rizky Ridho
- (Indonesia) Ryuji Utomo
- (Indonesia) Salman Alfarid
- (Indonesia) Sandi Sute
- (Indonesia) Rasyid Bakri
- (Indonesia) Hariono
- (Indonesia) Henhen Herdiana
- (Indonesia) Fahmi Al Ayyubi
- (Indonesia) Muhammad Arfan
- (Indonesia) Haudi Abdillah
- (Indonesia) Saddam Gaffar
- (Indonesia) Clio Yaveshly Solakhomi
- (Indonesia) Syafril Lestaluhu
- (Malaysia) Faisal Halim

==== Pencak silat ====
- (Indonesia) Puspa Arum Sari
