= Safin Futsal Club =

Indonesian futsal club

Safin Pati
- Full name: Safin Futsal Club Pati
- Nicknames: Bandeng Juwana (The Juwana Milkfish)
- Founded: 5 July 2017; 8 years ago
- Chairman: Saiful Arifin
- Coach: Alvaro Martinez
- League: Pro Futsal League
- 2020: PFL, Runner-up
- Website: https://sknfutsal.com

Safin Futsal Club Pati is an Indonesian professional futsal club based in Pati, Central Java. The club plays in the Indonesia Pro Futsal League.

== Players ==
=== Current squad ===
As of 5 December 2019

| # | Position | Name | Nationality |
|---|---|---|---|
| 2 | Goalkeeper | Tely Sarendra | (Indonesia) |
| 3 | Goalkeeper | Dimas Dwi | (Indonesia) |
| 4 | Winger | Muhammad Syaifullah | (Indonesia) |
| 7 | Defender | Aditya Muhammad | (Indonesia) |
| 8 | Pivot | Facundo Schusterman | (Argentina) |
| 9 | Pivot | Samuel Eko | (Indonesia) |
| 11 | Defender | Ahmad Khoeron | (Indonesia) |
| 12 | Goalkeeper | Krisna Bramenta | (Indonesia) |
| 13 | Winger | Rico Aji Putra | (Indonesia) |
| 14 | Winger | Filippo Inzaghi | (Indonesia) |
| 15 | Defender | Rio Pangestu | (Indonesia) |
| 16 | Winger | Guntur Sulistyo | (Indonesia) |
| 17 | Winger | Rizal Musthofa | (Indonesia) |
| 18 | Defender | Dewa Rizki | (Indonesia) |
| 19 | Winger | Anton Cahyo | (Indonesia) |
| 20 | Pivot | Muhammad Sanjaya | (Indonesia) |

== Sponsor ==
| Year | Apparel | Sponsors |
|---|---|---|
| 2019 | Ortuseight | SKN Group, Elastico, Jogokaryan |
| 2020 | Ortuseight | SKN Group, Elastico, Macaubet |

== Club Honours ==
=== National competitions ===
- Pro Futsal League
  - Runner-up: 2018, 2020
  - Third place: 2019

=== Continental competitions ===
- AFF Futsal Club Championship
  - Semi-finalist: 2018

== Coaching staff ==
As of 5 December 2019

| Position | Name |
|---|---|
| Head Coach | (Spain) Alvaro Martinez Castilla |
| Assistant Coach | (Indonesia) Sumianto |
| Goalkeeping Coach | (Indonesia) Eka Sanjaya |
| Physioterapist | (Indonesia) Sulaiman Budi |
