= 2025–26 MFF Futsal League =

MFF Futsal League I
- Season: 2025-26
- Champions: Yangon Royal Group (YRG FC)
- Matches: 264
- Goals: 854 (3.23 per match)
- Longest unbeaten run: YRG (21 matches)

The 2025–26 MFF Futsal League, also known as Glan Master Futsal League for sponsorship reasons, is the 11th season of the MFF Futsal League.

YRG become a champions of 2025-26 Glan Master MFF Fustal League champion and won 150 millions MMK. YCDT was the 1st runner-up and MIU was the 2nd runner-up.

== League standings ==
| Pos | Team | Pld | W | D | L | GF | GA | GD | Pts | |
|---|---|---|---|---|---|---|---|---|---|---|
| 1 | YRG FC | 22 | 21 | 0 | 1 | 150 | 33 | +117 | 63 | Champion |
| 2 | YCDC Dream Team | 22 | 21 | 0 | 1 | 114 | 63 | +51 | 63 | |
| 3 | MIU FC | 22 | 14 | 2 | 6 | 82 | 53 | +29 | 44 | |
| 4 | M2K FC | 22 | 12 | 2 | 8 | 81 | 57 | +24 | 38 | |
| 5 | TG United | 22 | 11 | 1 | 10 | 61 | 56 | +5 | 34 | |
| 6 | VUC FC | 22 | 9 | 3 | 10 | 65 | 79 | −14 | 30 | |
| 7 | Pacific Sun Far | 22 | 8 | 1 | 13 | 49 | 103 | −54 | 25 | |
| 8 | SGF FC | 22 | 7 | 2 | 13 | 56 | 75 | −19 | 23 | |
| 9 | United City FC | 22 | 7 | 2 | 13 | 69 | 95 | −26 | 23 | Relegation to the Futsal League 2 |
| 10 | Team Lions | 22 | 6 | 2 | 14 | 55 | 79 | −24 | 20 | Relegation to the Futsal League 2 |
| 11 | Gold Dream | 22 | 4 | 1 | 17 | 31 | 78 | −47 | 13 | Relegation to the Futsal League 2 |
| 12 | Chinland FC | 22 | 4 | 0 | 18 | 47 | 149 | −102 | 12 | Relegation to the Futsal League 2 |

Source: MFF Futsal League (Facebook)

== Honour ==
- Best Goalkeeper - Kyaw Ye Thwe (YCDC Dream team)
- The Best player - Ko Ko Lwin (YRG FC)

== External Link ==
- 2025-26 Myanmar National League
- 2025-26 Myanmar Women's League
