= Sydney Scorpions =

- Full name: Sydney Scorpions Futsal Club
- Nickname(s): Scorpions
- Founded: 2013
- Ground: Valentine Sports Park
- Chairmen: Jamie Amendolia; Peter Spathis
- League: F-League
- Website: http://sydneyscorpions.com.au/

Sydney Scorpions Futsal Club is an Australian Futsal club based in Sydney, NSW. They play in the F-League which is the top tier of Australian Futsal. The club was founded by Jamie Amendolia and futsalroo Peter Spathis in 2013.

== Notable players ==
- Aaron Cimitle (Futsalroos representative)
- Roberto Maiorana (Futsalroos representative)
- Peter Spathis (Futsalroos representative)
- Chris Zeballos (Futsalroos representative)
