= Sudiang Sports Hall =

Multipurpose sports arena in Makassar, Indonesia

- Gelanggang Olahraga Sudiang
- Location: Makassar, Indonesia
- Capacity: 5,000

Sudiang Sports Hall (Indonesian: Gedung Olahraga Sudiang) or commonly known as GOR Sudiang is a multifunctional sports arena in Biringkanaya, Makassar, South Sulawesi, Indonesia. This arena is used for basketball, badminton, volleyball, futsal, and taekwondo venues.
