= Myanmar Imperial University =

University in Myanmar

Coordinates: 16°47′21.9″N 96°09′05.1″E

- Established: 2010; 16 years ago
- Accreditation: Pearson Education
- Academic affiliations: University of Northampton
- Students: 1,400
- Location: No.1, Zay Myauk Street, Phayagyi Ward, Dagon Township, Yangon, Myanmar
- Website: www.miu.org.mm

Myanmar Imperial University, formerly Myanmar Imperial College, is a private university in Yangon, Myanmar, located in Dagon Township's Phayagyi ward. The institution began in 2010 as the Myanmar Imperial College; the university is accredited with Pearson Education in partnership with the University of Northampton in the United Kingdom. It has approximately 1,400 registered students and an alumni network of 3,200 graduates.

== Student life ==
In 2019, the university's futsal club won third place at the AFF Futsal Cup in Korat, Thailand.
