= Kranok pattern =

Kranok Sam Thua: the mother pattern of Kranok.

Kranok pattern (Thai: ลายกระหนก, RTGS: Lai Kranok) is a Thai motif pattern. It appears in many Thai artworks such as Tripiṭaka cabinets, the doors of Thai temples, and coffins. According to the Royal Institute Dictionary in 1982, Kranok refers to a pattern of lines. However, when it is written as Kanok, it means gold. The pattern basically repeats right triangles. The triangles may be the same size or different sizes. Often one point of each triangle goes in the same direction. In the Sanskrit language Kra-nok means thorns.

== History ==
=== Lai Thai pattern ===
The Thai pattern is inspired from nature, such as the Lotus, Jasmine, Java Cassia, and Sea Iceland Cotton

=== Lai Kranok pattern ===
The prototype of Lai Kranok is from the character of flame. The sacred lotus is the original of Kranok Sam-Tua and is the motif of other Kranok. In the past masters prescribed another name Kra-nok that means birds and woods (Dong Nok Dong Mai) that were created from nature. That can be spelled “Kor-Nok” but degenerate “O” vowel. A later generation called is Kra-Nok.

== Purpose ==
Thai patterns are to be used in religious institutions and the monarchy. The patterns decorate buildings and utensils such as a church, pavilion, palace, clothing, and ornaments.

== Template ==
=== Notch ===
Every Kranok features as notch or bezel. The notch divides the enveloping line equally. The notch can cut in or out.

The cut-in notch has a character similar to the lotus petal bud. The petal line bends into the flower. The depth is about half of the notch. The cut-out notch has a character similar to the petal of the lotus bloom. The petal line bends away from the flower.

=== Apex ===
The apex of Kranok is its most important feature. If the body has the perfect proportion but the apex is too strong, the pattern is destroyed.

=== Yhuk ===
To make the Kranok line look strong and lively, many artists draw the Yhuk (หยัก) shape. It looks like a small triangle with a curve. Yhuk is located on the side of the triangle. The spaces between each Yuk must be even. The top part of the triangle in the Kranok pattern is called Yaud Kranok (ยอดกระหนก).

== Types ==
Subtypes of Kranok pattern include:

- Kranok Sam Thua (กระหนกสามตัว)
- Kranok Plaew (กระหนกเปลว)
- Kranok Bai Tet (กระหนกใบเทศ)
- Kranok Pak Kud (กระหนกผักกูด)
- Kranok Kor (กระหนกกอ)
- Kranok Hang-Hong (กระหนกหางหงส์)

== Kranok Pattern in Artworks ==
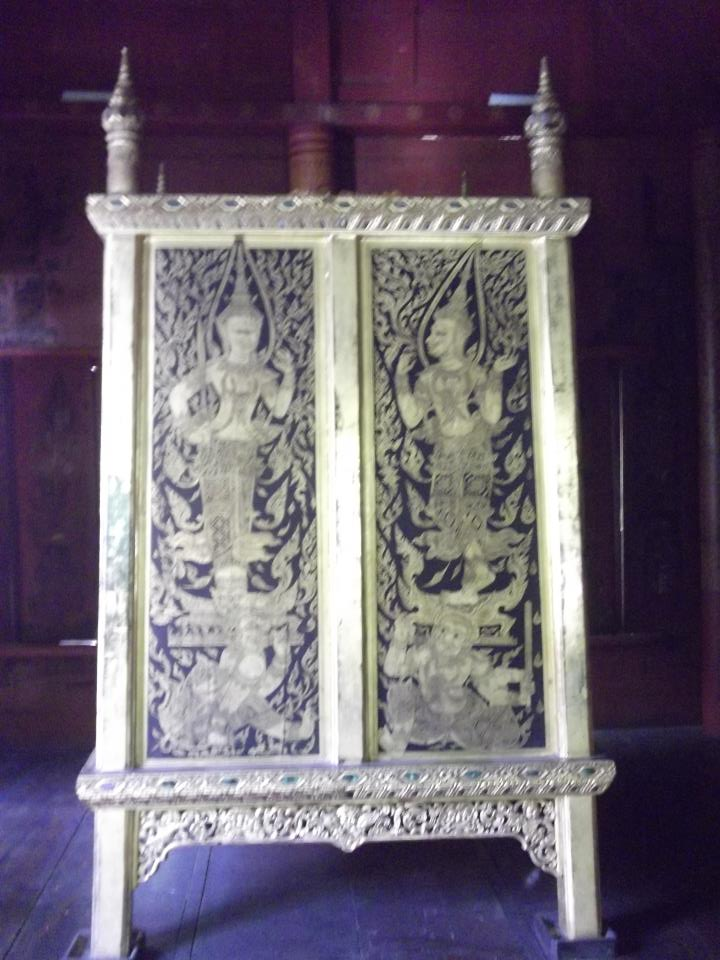
The Tripitaka cabinet with Kranok pattern.

One of the most famous Kranok artwork is the Tripitaka cabinet (Thai: ตู้พระไตรปิฎก), which can be found in most of Buddhist temples in Thailand.

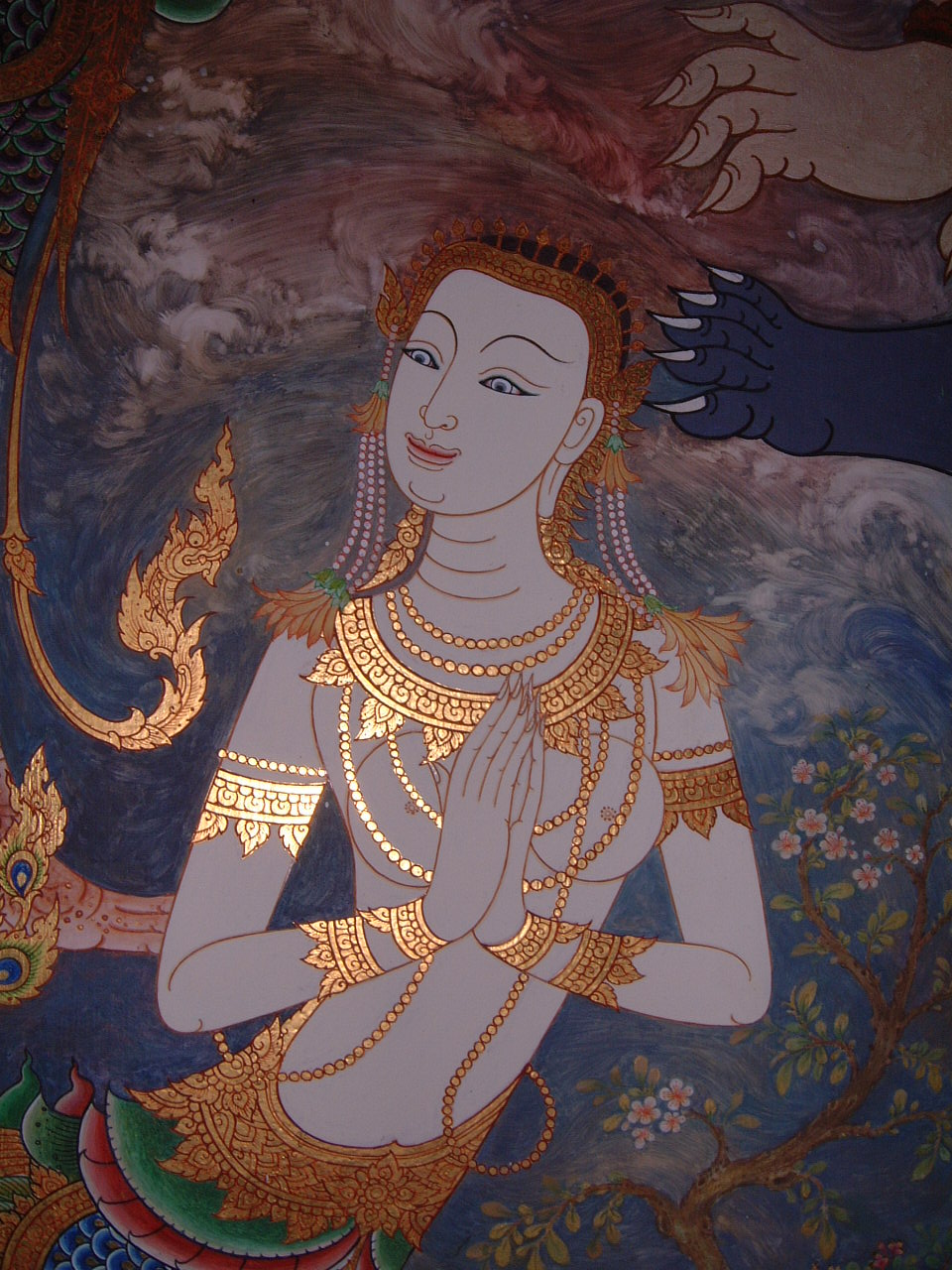
Kinnaree: a young woman wearing an angel-like costume.

The Kranok pattern can be used in many Thai designs. It is shown in general Thai artwork depending on the imagination of the artist. For example, in Thai painting and Thai carving, the delicate designs and gorgeous details are shown.
