= Miu (given name) =

- Gender: Female

Origin
- Origin: Japanese
- Meaning: Different meanings depending on the kanji used

Miu (written: 美雨, 美宇, 美優, 未生 or 海羽) is a feminine Japanese given name. Notable people with the name include:

- Miu Hirano (平野 美宇; born 2000), Japanese table tennis player
- Miu Sakamoto (坂本 美雨; born 1980), Japanese singer
- Miu Sato (佐藤 未生; born 1996), Japanese figure skater
- Miu Suzaki (須崎 海羽; born 1999), Japanese pair skater
- Miu Goto (後藤 希友; born 2001), Japanese softball left-handed

== Fictional characters ==
- Miu Fūrinji, protagonist of the manga series Shijou Saikyou no Deshi Kenichi
- Miu Kurosaki, from the video game The King of Fighters EX
- Miu Matsuoka, from the manga series Strawberry Marshmallow (Ichigo Mashimaro)
- Miu Sutō, main character from the Japanese television series Engine Sentai Go-onger
- Miu, character appearing in the hentai series Lolita Anime
- Miu Amano, from the manga series Blend S
- Miu Owusawa, from "Aesthetica of a Rogue Hero"
- Miu Iruma, from "Danganronpa V3: Killing Harmony"
- Miu Shinoda, from the manga and anime "Nana"
- Miu, character from the novel Sputnik Sweetheart
- Miu, from the manga DearS
- Miu Takigawa, character from 22/7 (group)
- Miu Hiyama, from the anime series Seiren
