= Shervin Adeli =

Australian futsal player

Personal information
- Full name: Shervin Keshavarz Adeli
- Date of birth: 4 May 1992 (age 34)
- Place of birth: Melbourne, Australia
- Position: Forward

Team information
- Current team: East Coast Heat

Senior career*
Years	Team	Apps	(Gls)
- East Coast Heat
- Northern Tigers FC

International career^{‡}
	Australia (futsal)	3	(2)
- * Club domestic league appearances and goals as of 9 January 2025 ‡ National team caps and goals as of 9 April 2015

Shervin Adeli (Persian: شروین عادلی; born 4 May 1992) is an Australian professional futsal player who plays for the East Coast Heat and the Australia national futsal team. He also plays outfield 11-a-side football for the Northern Tigers NPL club. He also plays for the Sixaroos, the Australian national six-a-side team captained by Samurai Sam.

== Career ==
Shervin Adeli has played for Australia in the 2010 AFC Futsal Championship, the 2016 FIFA Futsal World Cup, and the 2022 AFF Futsal Championship. He was suspended for four years from all football-related activity by the Asian Football Confederation after testing positive for the banned substance GW1516 during a futsal match at the 2024 AFC Futsal Asian Cup between Australia and Saudi Arabia on 19 April 2024. An appeal has been lodged against the decision, with proceedings pending.
