= Gong.bg =

gong.bg
- Website: www.gong.bg
- Launched: 26 January 2007; 19 years ago

Gong.bg is a sports media website based in Bulgaria. Over 80% of users are in Bulgaria, where it has an internet traffic rank of 35.

It was launched in 2007. The chief editor is Nikolai Alexandrov, a longstanding sports journalist with Darik Radio and Radio Gong.

Currently (April 2024) it has taken over the website of the Nova Sport sports channel.
