= Myanmar Futsal League =

- Founded: 2011
- Country: Myanmar
- Confederation: AFC (Asia)
- Number of clubs: 12
- Level on pyramid: 1
- Relegation to: MFF Futsal League II
- Domestic cup: MFF Futsal Champion Cup
- Current champions: YRG (2025-26)
- Most championships: MIU Futsal Club (5 titles)
- Broadcasters: HTV YouTube; MFF Futsal YouTube
- Website: Official Website
- Current: 2025-26 MFF Futsal League

The Myanmar Futsal League (Burmese: မြန်မာဖူဆယ်လိဂ်) is the top league for futsal clubs in Myanmar. Glan Master sponsors it for the 2025-2026 season and is therefore officially known as the Glan Master Futsal League.

== History ==
The Myanmar Futsal League, established in 2011, is the premier futsal competition in the country, featuring top clubs competing annually in a double round-robin format. The league has grown steadily over the years, with university-backed teams like Myanmar Imperial University (MIU) and Victoria University College (VUC) emerging as dominant forces. The 2024–25 season saw MIU clinch the championship with an impressive unbeaten run, securing 52 points from 17 wins and one draw. They were followed by MH Dream Team and YRG Futsal Team in second and third places, respectively. The league operates mainly at the MFF Futsal Court in Yangon and offers prize money to the top finishers, further incentivizing competition.

In addition to the men’s league, Myanmar has also developed a Women’s Futsal League, which launched in 2025 with ten teams participating in a similar double round-robin format. This development reflects growing support for women’s futsal in the country and aims to promote greater inclusivity and grassroots growth. The Myanmar Futsal League not only serves as a platform for local talent but also allows its champions to qualify for regional competitions organized by the Asian Football Confederation (AFC) and the ASEAN Football Federation (AFF), giving teams valuable international exposure.

Overall, the Myanmar Futsal League has become a key part of the country's sporting landscape, combining competitive play with developmental opportunities. Its expansion to include a women’s league further demonstrates the commitment to fostering futsal’s popularity across different demographics in Myanmar.

== Championship History ==
Season	Winner	Runner up	Third place
2011	ACE Futsal Club	UPT Futsal Club	Rakhine United
2012	ACE Futsal Club	Yangon City FC	UPT Futsal Club
2014-15	MIC Futsal Club	UPT Futsal Club	Pyay United
2016	MIC Futsal Club	Pyay United Futsal Club	VUC
2017	Pyay United Futsal Club	MIC Futsal Club	VUC
2018-19	MIU Futsal Club	VUC	GV Athletic
2019-20	MIU Futsal Club	VUC	GV Athletic
2022	VUC	MIU Futsal Club	Dream Team Futsal Club
2023	VUC	MIU Futsal Club	Generations Futsal CLUB
2024-2025	MIU Futsal Club	MH Dream Team	YRG Futsal Team
2025-2026	YRG	YCDC Dream Team	MIU Futsal Club

== See also ==
- Myanmar national futsal team
