= Dural Warriors =

- Full name: Dural Warriors Futsal Club
- Nickname: Warriors
- Founded: 1994
- Ground: Dural Sport and Leisure Centre
- Chairmen: Brian Codrington
- League: F-League; FNSW Premier League
- Website: http://www.dslc.com.au/futsal/dural-warriors/

Dural Warriors Futsal Club is an Australian Futsal club based in Sydney, NSW. They played in the F-League which was the top tier of Australian Futsal until Football New South Wales cut the funding resulting in the collapse of the F-League. The club was founded by Dural Baptist Church and Brian Codrington in 1994.

== Notable players ==
- Gregory Giovenali (Futsalroos representative)
- Tobias Seeto (Futsalroos representative)
- Wade Giovenali (Futsalroos representative)
- Daine Merrin (Futsalroos representative)
