= East Coast Heat F.C. =

East Coast Heat
- Full name: East Coast Heat Futsal Club
- Nickname: Heat
- Founded: 2012
- Ground: All Sorts Indoor Sports Centre
- Chairmen: Jamie Amendolia; Peter Spathis
- League: F-League
- Website: http://www.eastcoastheatfc.com/East_Coast_Heat/Home.html

East Coast Heat Futsal Club is an Australian futsal club based in Sydney, NSW. They play in the F-League which is the top tier of Australian Futsal. The club was founded by Jamie Amendolia and Futsalroo Peter Spathis in 2012.

== Notable players ==
- Aaron Cimitle (Futsalroos representative)
- Roberto Maiorana (Futsalroos representative)
- Peter Spathis (Futsalroos representative)
- Chris Zeballos (Futsalroos representative)
- Shervin Adeli (Futsalroos representative)
- Grant Lynch (Futsalroos representative)
- Jordan Guerreiro (Futsalroos representative)
