= List of top-division futsal clubs in AFC countries =

AFC countries on this map of the world's six football confederations.

This is a list of top-division association futsal clubs in AFC countries. The Asian Football Confederation (AFC) includes all Asian countries except Armenia, Azerbaijan, Cyprus, Georgia, Israel, Kazakhstan and Turkey as members, but also includes the Oceanian countries of Australia, Guam, and the Northern Mariana Islands (the association of the Northern Mariana Islands is a provisional associate member of AFC but not a member of FIFA).

The football associations of Armenia, Azerbaijan, Cyprus, Georgia, Israel, Kazakhstan and Turkey are members of UEFA, the European football confederation (Israel and Kazakhstan were previously AFC members but had left). Hong Kong and Macau, the special administrative regions of the People's Republic of China, have their own football associations which are members of AFC. The Republic of China (called Chinese Taipei in the international sports community) and Palestine, both members of the IOC but not the UN, also have their own football associations which are members of AFC.

Each of the AFC member countries have their own football league systems. The clubs playing in each top-level league compete for the title as the country's club champions, and also for places in next season's AFC club competitions, i.e., the AFC Futsal Club Championship. Due to promotion and relegation, the clubs playing in the top-level league are different every season; however, some league systems do not have promotion and relegation.

== Afghanistan ==
- Football association: Afghanistan Football Federation

== Australia ==
- Football association: Football Federation Australia
- Top-level league: F-League

Club	Location	Home Ground	Founded	Joined	Head Coach
Boomerangs F.S.	(Australian Capital Territory) Canberra, ACT	AIS Training Hall	2008	2011	(Australia) Simon Aitchison
Dural Warriors	(New South Wales) Sydney, NSW	Dural Sport and Leisure Centre	1994	2011	(Australia) Rob Varela
East Coast Heat	(New South Wales) Sydney, NSW		2012	2012	(Australia) Jamie Amendolia
Galaxy FC	(Queensland) Gold Coast, QLD	Gold Coast Sports & Leisure Centre	2015	2015	(Brazil) Vini Liete
Jaguars FSC	(Victoria (state)) Melbourne, VIC	Caroline Springs Leisure Centre	2012	2012	(Australia) Jack Dugonjic
Melbourne Heart FC	(Victoria (state)) Melbourne, VIC		2012	2012	(Australia) Edgard Vatcky
Sydney Scorpions	(New South Wales) Sydney, NSW		2013	2013	(Australia) Glenn Lockhart
St. Albans Strikers FC	(Victoria (state)) Melbourne, VIC	St Albans Secondary College	2006	2011	(Australia) Rob Lakovski
Vic Vipers	(Victoria (state)) Melbourne, VIC		1999	2012	(Australia) Milton Sakkos

== Bahrain ==
- Football association: Bahrain Football Association

== Bangladesh ==
- Football association: Bangladesh Football Federation

== Bhutan ==
- Football association: Bhutan Football Federation

== Cambodia ==
- Football association: Cambodian Football Federation

== People's Republic of China ==
- Football association: Football Association of the People's Republic of China
- Top-level league: Chinese Futsal League

== Republic of China (Chinese Taipei) ==
See Chinese Taipei for the naming issue.

- Football association: Chinese Taipei Football Association

== East Timor (Timor-Leste) ==
- Football association: Federaçao Futebol Timor-Leste

== Guam ==
- Football association: Guam Football Association

== Hong Kong ==
- Football association: The Hong Kong Football Association
- Top-level league: Hong Kong Futsal League

As of 2010–11 season:

- Homeless
- HKIED
- Kitchee
- Milk
- South China
- TSW Pegasus

== India ==
- Football association: All India Football Federation
- Top-level league: Premier Futsal

As of 2017 season:

- Mumbai Warriors
- Delhi Dragons
- Kerala Cobras
- Bengaluru Royals
- Telugu Tigers
- Chennai Singhams

== Indonesia ==
- Football association: Football Association of Indonesia
- Top-level league: Indonesia Pro Futsal League

As of 2023 season:

- Bintang Timur Surabaya
- Black Steel Papua
- Cosmo JNE Jakarta
- Giga FC
- Halus FC
- Kancil WHW Pontianak
- Pelindo Mutiara
- Pendekar United
- Radit FC
- Sadakata United Subulussalam
- Unggul FC
- Fafage Vamos Banua

== Iran ==
- Football association: Islamic Republic of Iran Football Federation
- Top-level league: Iranian Futsal Super League

As of 2013–14 season:

Team	City	Venue	Capacity	Head coach	Team captain	Past Season
Dabiri Tabriz	Tabriz	Olom Pezeshki	2,000	(Iran) Amir Shamsaei	–	4th
Farsh Ara	Mashhad	Shahid Beheshti	6,000	(Iran) Majid Mortezaei	–	8th
Giti Pasand	Esfahan	Pirouzi	4,000	(Iran) Reza Lak Aliabadi	(Iran) Mohammad Keshavarz	Champion
Hilal Ahmar Tabriz	Tabriz	Shahid Pour Sharifi	6,000	(Iran) Mohsen Khabiri	–	11th
Mahan Tandis	Qom	Shahid Heidarian	2,000	(Iran) Vahid Ghiyasi	(Iran) Saeed Ghasemi	Replaced for Saba Qom
Melli Haffari Iran	Ahvaz	Naft	1,000	(Iran) Mohammad Nazem Alsharie	–	6th
Misagh	Tehran	Shahrdari Mantaghe 11	–	(Iran) Mahmoud Khorakchi	–	5th
Petroshimi Maron	Mahshahr	Besat	–	–	–	Replaced for Gaz Khozestan
Rah Sari	Sari	Sayed Rasoul Hosseini	5,000	(Iran) Saeid Bastami	–	10th
Shahid Mansouri	Gharchak	7th Tir	3,000	(Iran) Reza Davarzani	–	3rd
Shahrdari Saveh	Saveh	Fajr	2,500	(Iran) Seyed Mehdi Abtahi	(Iran) Morteza Vakili	9th
Shahrdari Tabriz	Tabriz	Shahid Pour Sharifi	6.000	(Iran) Esmail Taghipour	–	7th
Tasisat Daryaei	Tehran	Dastgerdi	–	(Iran) Ali Sanei	–	Promoted
Zam Zam Isfahan	Esfahan	Pirouzi	4,000	(Iran) Mehdi Mohammadi	–	Replaced for Giti Pasand Novin

== Iraq ==
- Football association: Iraq Football Association

== Japan ==
- Football association: Japan Football Association
- Top-level league: F. League

As of 2012–13 season:

Team	City/Area	Main Arena
Espolada Hokkaido	Sapporo, Hokkaido	Hokkaido Prefectural Sports Center
Bardral Urayasu	Urayasu, Chiba	Urayasu General Gymnasium
Fuchu Athletic F.C.	Fuchū, Tokyo	Fuchu Sports Center
Pescadola Machida	Machida, Tokyo	Machida Municipal General Gymnasium
Shonan Bellmare	Hiratsuka, Kanagawa	Odawara Arena
Agleymina Hamamatsu	Hamamatsu, Shizuoka	Hamamatsu Arena
Nagoya Oceans	Nagoya, Aichi	Taiyo Yakuhin Ocean Arena
Shriker Osaka	Osaka, Osaka	Osaka Municipal Central Gymnasium
Deução Kobe	Kobe, Hyogo	Kobe Green Arena
Vasagey Oita	Oita, Oita	Oozu Sports Park

== Jordan ==
- Football association: Jordan Football Association

== Korea DPR ==
- Football association: DPR Korea Football Association

== Korea Republic ==
- Football association: Korea Football Association
- Top-level league: FK-League

As of 2012–13 season:

- Fantasia Bucheon FS
- Gyeongsan Osung FC
- Jecheon FS
- Jeonju MAG FC
- FS Seoul
- Seoul Eunpyeong FS
- Seoul Gwangjin FC
- Yes Gumi FC
- Yongin FS

== Kuwait ==
- Football association: Kuwait Football Association

== Kyrgyzstan ==
- Football association: Football Federation of Kyrgyz Republic
- Top-level league: Kyrgyzstan Futsal League

As of 2011 season:

Club
Nalogovik-1
Greenwich Club
Bank Asii
Jannat
Emir
6Chon-Tash
San&Co.
Bulat
RSK Bank
Ak-Jol
Nalogovik-2
Kumtor
Jetigen

== Laos ==
- Football association: Lao Football Federation

== Lebanon ==
- Football association: Federation Libanaise de Football

== Macau ==
- Football association: Macau Football Association

== Malaysia ==
- Football association: Football Association of Malaysia
- Top-level league: Malaysia Premier Futsal League

As of 2019 season:

Clubs	Location	Venue
Kedah	Alor Setar	Sultan Abdul Halim Stadium
Kuala Lumpur	Shah Alam	Panasonic Sport Complex
Kuala Lumpur City	Shah Alam	Panasonic Sport Complex
Penang	Gelugor	Azman Hashim USM Sport Arena
Melaka	Shah Alam	Panasonic Sport Complex
Pahang	Kuantan	SUKPA Indoor Stadium
Perak	Ipoh	Indera Mulia Stadium
Selangor	Shah Alam	Panasonic Sport Complex
Terengganu	Kuala Terengganu	Kuala Terengganu State Stadium

== Maldives ==
- Football association: Football Association of Maldives

== Mongolia ==
- Football association: Mongolian Football Federation

== Myanmar ==
- Football association: Myanmar Football Federation

== Nepal ==
- Football association: All Nepal Football Association

== Northern Mariana Islands ==
- Football association: Northern Mariana Islands Football Association

== Oman ==
- Football association: Oman Football Association

== Pakistan ==
- Football association: Pakistan Football Federation

== Palestine ==
- Football association: Palestinian Football Federation

== Philippines ==
- Football association: Philippine Football Federation

== Qatar ==
- Football association: Qatar Football Association
- Top-level league: Qatar Futsal League
- Table as of 2011-12 Season

Qatar Stars League
Club	Location
Al-Ahly Doha	Doha
Al-Arabi Doha Sports Club	Doha
Al-Gharafa Sports Club	Al-Gharafa, Al-Rayyan
Al-Khor Sports Club	Al Khor
Al Rayyan Futsal Team	Al-Rayyan
Al-Sadd Sports Club	Al-Sadd, Doha
Al-Wakrah Sports Club	Al Wakrah
Qatar SC	Al Dafna, Doha
Umm-Salal Sports Club	Umm Salal
Al-Shamal Sports Club	Madinat ash Shamal

== Saudi Arabia ==
- Football association: Saudi Arabia Football Federation

== Singapore ==
- Football association: Football Association of Singapore

== Sri Lanka ==
- Football association: Football Federation of Sri Lanka

== Syria ==
- Football association: Syrian Arab Federation for Football

== Tajikistan ==
- Football association: Tajikistan Football Federation

== Thailand ==
- Football association: Football Association of Thailand
- Top-level league: Thailand Futsal League

Competition of 16 club in 2012-13 league

- Bangkok F.C.
- CAT F.C.
- Hongyen Tha Kham Samut Songkhram Futsal Club
- Nonthaburi Futsal Club
- G.H. RBAC Chonburi
- Rajnavy
- Samut Prakan Futsal Club
- Samut Sakhon Futsal Club
- Sripatum Sunlite Sisaket
- Surat Thani Lightning Shrimps
- Thai Port Futsal Club
- Lampang United Pathum Kongka
- Highways Department FC
- Leo Bang Sue
- Phuket United
- Prachinburi Thai Tobacco Monopoly Futsal Club

== Turkmenistan ==
- Football association: Football Association of Turkmenistan

== United Arab Emirates ==
- Football association: United Arab Emirates Football Association

== Uzbekistan ==
- Football association: Uzbekistan Football Federation
- Top-level league: Uzbekistan Futsal League

Club
Ardus Tashkent
Lokomotiv Tashkent
Stroitel Zarafshan
Bunyodkor Tashkent
Maksam Chirchik
Kagan
Turon-S Andijan
Pahtakor Tashkent

== Vietnam ==
- Football association: Vietnam Football Federation
- Top-level league: Vietnam futsal championship

Competition of 8 club in 2015 league second-stage:

- Sanna Khanh Hoa
- Thai Son Bac
- Thai Son Nam
- Sannatech Khanh Hoa
- Tan Hiep Hung
- HT Da Nang
- HPN Phu Nhuan
- Binh Thuan

== Yemen ==
- Football association: Yemen Football Association

== See also ==
- List of top-division futsal clubs in CONMEBOL countries
- List of top-division futsal clubs in UEFA countries
