= 2010 FK Cup =

Tournament details
- Country: South Korea
- Teams: 5

Final positions
- Champions: FS Seoul (1st title)
- Runners-up: Jeonju MAG

Tournament statistics
- Matches played: 10
- Goals scored: 110 (11 per match)

Awards
- Best player: Ha Jin-won

The 2010 FK Cup was the first edition of the FK Cup, a competition for futsal clubs in South Korea. The competition was held from 13 to 15 August 2010 in Hoengseong, Gangwon. All matches were played at Songho College Gymnasium, Hoengseong.

== Table ==
Pos	Team	Pld	W	D	L	GF	GA	GD	Pts
1	FS Seoul (C)	4	4	0	0	26	12	+14	12
2	Jeonju MAG	4	2	1	1	25	18	+7	7
3	Seoul Gwangjin	4	2	1	1	22	18	+4	7
4	Yongin FS	4	1	0	3	20	28	−8	3
5	Yes Gumi	4	0	0	4	17	34	−17	0
