= 2011 FK Cup =

Tournament details
- Country: South Korea
- Teams: 12

Final positions
- Champions: FS Seoul (2nd title)
- Runners-up: Yongin FS

Tournament statistics
- Matches played: 15
- Goals scored: 173 (11.53 per match)
- Top goal scorer: Song Jung-sub

Awards
- Best player: Ha Jin-won

The 2011 FK Cup was the second edition of the FK Cup, a competition for futsal clubs in South Korea. The competition was held from 25 to 28 August 2011 in Boeun, Chungbuk. All matches were played at Boeun Gymnasium, Boeun. FS Seoul defeated Yongin FS by a score of 9–3 to win the championship for the second consecutive year.

== Group stage ==
=== Group A ===
Pos	Team	Pld	W	D	L	GF	GA	GD	Pts
1	Yongin FS	2	2	0	0	21	7	+14	6
2	Bucheon FS Looser	2	1	1	0	9	8	+1	4
3	Yes Gumi	2	0	1	1	8	11	−3	1
4	Pohang FC Link	2	0	0	2	7	19	−12	0

25 August 2011

Yes Gumi	4–4	Bucheon FS Looser
Penalties
	6–7

Boeun Gymnasium, Boeun

25 August 2011

Yongin FS	14–3	Pohang FC Link

Boeun Gymnasium, Boeun

26 August 2011

Bucheon FS Looser	5–4	Pohang FC Link

Boeun Gymnasium, Boeun

26 August 2011

Yongin FS	7–4	Yes Gumi

Boeun Gymnasium, Boeun

=== Group B ===
Pos	Team	Pld	W	D	L	GF	GA	GD	Pts
1	Jeonju MAG	2	2	0	0	21	8	+13	6
2	Danyang FC	2	1	1	0	9	8	+1	4
3	Beautiful Gyeongju	2	0	1	1	8	14	−6	1
4	Seoul Gwangjin	2	0	0	2	8	16	−8	0

25 August 2011

Seoul Gwangjin	4–5	Danyang FC

Boeun Gymnasium, Boeun

25 August 2011

Jeonju MAG	10–4	Beautiful Gyeongju

Boeun Gymnasium, Boeun

26 August 2011

Jeonju MAG	11–4	Seoul Gwangjin

Boeun Gymnasium, Boeun

26 August 2011

Danyang FC	4–4	Beautiful Gyeongju
Penalties
	3–4

Boeun Gymnasium, Boeun

=== Group C ===
Pos	Team	Pld	W	D	L	GF	GA	GD	Pts
1	FS Seoul	2	2	0	0	27	2	+25	6
2	Chuncheon Random	2	2	0	0	15	5	+10	6
3	Woosuk University	2	0	0	2	3	13	−10	0
4	Daejeon All-Star	2	0	0	2	4	29	−25	0

25 August 2011

FS Seoul	8–2	Woosuk University

Boeun Gymnasium, Boeun

25 August 2011

Chuncheon Random	10–4	Daejeon All-Star

Boeun Gymnasium, Boeun

26 August 2011

FS Seoul	19–0	Daejeon All-Star

Boeun Gymnasium, Boeun

26 August 2011

Chuncheon Random	5–1	Woosuk University

Boeun Gymnasium, Boeun

== Knockout stage ==
=== Semi-finals ===
27 August 2011

FS Seoul	10–4	Chuncheon Random

Boeun Gymnasium, Boeun

27 August 2011

Yongin FS	4–3	Jeonju MAG

Boeun Gymnasium, Boeun

=== Final ===
28 August 2011

FS Seoul	9–3	Yongin FS

Boeun Gymnasium, Boeun
