= 2009–10 FK-League =

FK-League
- Season: 2009–10
- Champions: Jeonju MAG (1st title)
- Matches: 31
- Goals: 359 (11.58 per match)
- Best Player: Oh Hyun-jong
- Top goalscorer: Shin Jong-hoon (22 goals)

The 2009–10 FK-League was the first season of the FK-League, the South Korean semi-professional futsal league. The season began on 25 December 2009, and ended on 19 March 2010. All matches were played at Yongin Gymnasium, Yongin.

== Teams ==
- Hanbang Jecheon
- Jeonju MAG
- FS Seoul
- Seoul Gwangjin
- Yes Gumi
- Yongin FS

== Regular season ==
Pos	Team	Pld	W	D	L	GF	GA	GD	Pts	Qualification
1	FS Seoul	10	8	1	1	80	41	+39	25	Advance to final
2	Jeonju MAG	10	7	0	3	56	31	+25	21	Advance to final
3	Hanbang Jecheon	10	6	1	3	68	54	+14	19	
4	Yongin FS	10	3	0	7	51	73	−22	9	
5	Seoul Gwangjin	10	2	2	6	59	82	−23	8	
6	Yes Gumi	10	1	2	7	37	70	−33	5	

== Final ==
19 March 2010
19:00

FS Seoul	2–6	Jeonju MAG

Yongin Gymnasium, Yongin

== Awards ==
- Most Valuable Player: Oh Hyun-jong (Jeonju MAG)
- Top goalscorer: Shin Jong-hoon (FS Seoul, 22 goals)
- Fair Play Award: Yongin FS
