= 2011–12 FK-League =

FK-League
- Season: 2011–12
- Champions: FS Seoul (2nd title)
- Matches: 42
- Goals: 368 (8.76 per match)
- Best Player: Shin Jong-hoon
- Top goalscorer: Song Jung-sub

The 2011–12 FK-League was the third season of the FK-League, the South Korean semi-professional futsal league. The season began on 9 December 2011, and ended on 24 March 2012. All matches were played at Boeun Gymnasium, Boeun.

== Teams ==
- Gyeongju Soonwoo
- Gyeongsan Five Stars
- Jeonju MAG
- FS Seoul
- Seoul Gwangjin
- Yes Gumi
- Yongin FS

== League table ==
Pos	Team	Pld	W	D	L	GF	GA	GD	Pts
1	FS Seoul (C)	12	11	1	0	88	18	+70	34
2	Jeonju MAG	12	9	2	1	55	27	+28	29
3	Gyeongsan Five Stars	12	6	1	5	51	44	+7	19
4	Yongin FS	12	4	2	6	55	73	−18	14
5	Seoul Gwangjin	12	4	0	8	40	70	−30	12
6	Yes Gumi	12	3	0	9	41	69	−28	9
7	Gyeongju Soonwoo	12	2	0	10	38	67	−29	6

== Awards ==
- Most Valuable Player: Shin Jong-hoon (FS Seoul)
- Top goalscorer: Song Jung-sub (FS Seoul)
- Best Goalkeeper: Heo Myung-beom (FS Seoul)
- Best Manager: Lee Chang-hwan (FS Seoul)
- Fair Play Award: Gyeongju Soonwoo
