= 2014–15 FK-League =

FK-League
- Season: 2014–15
- Champions: Jeonju MAG (4th title)
- Best Player: Shin Jong-hoon
- Top goalscorer: Oh Hyeon-jong
- Best goalkeeper: Han Min-gyu

The 2014–15 FK-League was the sixth season of the FK-League, the South Korean semi-professional futsal league. Jeonju MAG became the champions, winning the league for the third consecutive time, and bagging their fourth title overall.

== Teams ==
- Busan Kappa
- Chungbuk Jecheon
- IFC Daejeon
- Dream Hub Gunsan
- Fantasia Bucheon
- Seoul FITF
- Jeonju MAG
- FS Seoul
- Seoul Eunpyeong
- Seoul Gwangjin
- Yes Gumi
- Yongin FS

== Regular season ==
=== Group A ===
Pos	Team	Pld	W	D	L	GF	GA	GD	Pts	Qualification
1	FS Seoul	16	14	1	1	143	39	+104	43	Advance to play-offs semi-finals
2	Fantasia Bucheon	16	12	2	2	69	31	+38	38	Advance to play-offs first round
3	Seoul Eunpyeong	16	9	1	6	104	64	+40	28	Advance to play-offs first round
4	Dream Hub Gunsan	16	6	1	9	67	84	−17	19	
5	Seoul Gwangjin	16	2	3	11	60	117	−57	9	
6	Seoul FITF	16	0	1	15	61	206	−145	1	

=== Group B ===
Pos	Team	Pld	W	D	L	GF	GA	GD	Pts	Qualification
1	Jeonju MAG	16	13	3	0	76	43	+33	42	Advance to play-offs semi-finals
2	Chungbuk Jecheon	16	9	2	5	81	47	+34	29	Advance to play-offs first round
3	Yongin FS	16	8	2	6	91	68	+23	26	Advance to play-offs first round
4	Busan Kappa	16	7	0	9	62	55	+7	21	
5	Yes Gumi	16	5	1	10	55	63	−8	16	
6	IFC Daejeon	16	2	1	13	33	85	−52	7	

== Championship play-offs ==
First round
B2	Chungbuk Jecheon	9
A3	Seoul Eunpyeong	3
A2	Fantasia Bucheon	1
B3	Yongin FS	3

Semi-finals
A1	FS Seoul	6	6	12
Chungbuk Jecheon	2	6	8
B1	Jeonju MAG	4	7	11
Yongin FS	2	3	5

Final
FS Seoul	2	2	4
Jeonju MAG	3	5	8
