= 2018 AFC Futsal Championship squads =

The following is a list of squads for each national team competing at the 2018 AFC Futsal Championship. The tournament took place during February 2018 in Taiwan (referred to as Chinese Taipei by the AFC). It was the 15th competition organised by the Asian Football Confederation (AFC) for the men's national teams of Asia.

Each team had to register a squad of 14 players, minimum two of whom had to be goalkeepers. The full squad listings are below.

== Group A ==
=== Chinese Taipei ===
Chinese Taipei named their squad on 31 January 2018.

Head coach: (Portugal) Adil Amarante

No.	Pos.	Player	Date of birth (age)	Club
1	GK	Chiang Hsin-wei	9 December 1996 (aged 21)	(Chinese Taipei Football Association) Taipei Physical Education College
12	GK	Chen Wei-chun	18 February 2000 (aged 17)	(Chinese Taipei Football Association) Hualien High School of Agriculture
2	FP	Chiu Chia-wei	22 August 1986 (aged 31)	(Chinese Taipei Football Association) Hualien High School of Agriculture
3	FP	Chou I-te		(Chinese Taipei Football Association) University of Kang Ning
4	FP	Hung Kai-chun	4 March 1987 (aged 30)	(Chinese Taipei Football Association) Taiwan Power Company
5	FP	Huang Po-chun	23 August 1993 (aged 24)	
6	FP	Hung Wei-teng	12 November 1994 (aged 23)	(Chinese Taipei Football Association) Taipei Physical Education College
7	FP	Chang Chien-ying	29 December 1982 (aged 35)	
8	FP	Huang Tai-hsiang	5 March 1997 (aged 20)	(Chinese Taipei Football Association) Taipei Physical Education College
9	FP	Lin Chih-hung	26 July 1997 (aged 20)	(Chinese Taipei Football Association) Taipei Physical Education College
10	FP	Chi Sheng-fa	21 August 1993 (aged 24)	
11	FP	Lai Ming-hui	28 August 1997 (aged 20)	(Chinese Taipei Football Association) Taipei Physical Education College
13	FP	Lin Chien-hsun	10 January 1993 (aged 25)	(Chinese Taipei Football Association) Taiwan Power Company
14	FP	Chen Ching-hsuan		(Chinese Taipei Football Association) WuFeng University

=== Vietnam ===
Head coach: (Spain) Miguel Rodrigo

No.	Pos.	Player	Date of birth (age)	Club
1	GK	Ngô Đình Thuận	5 July 1987 (aged 30)	(Vietnam Football Federation) Thái Sơn Nam
2	GK	Nguyễn Văn Huy	13 August 1989 (aged 28)	(Vietnam Football Federation) Thái Sơn Bắc
3	FP	Lê Quốc Nam	14 November 1993 (aged 24)	(Vietnam Football Federation) Thái Sơn Nam
4	FP	Cổ Trí Kiệt	4 September 1995 (aged 22)	(Vietnam Football Federation) Thái Sơn Nam
5	FP	Ngô Ngọc Sơn	24 March 1995 (aged 22)	(Vietnam Football Federation) Thái Sơn Nam
6	FP	Phạm Đức Hòa	12 April 1991 (aged 26)	(Vietnam Football Federation) Thái Sơn Nam
7	FP	Phùng Trọng Luân	20 October 1985 (aged 32)	(Vietnam Football Federation) Thái Sơn Nam
8	FP	Vũ Quốc Hưng	20 June 1991 (aged 26)	(Vietnam Football Federation) Hải Phương Nam
9	FP	Trần Thái Huy	12 October 1995 (aged 22)	(Vietnam Football Federation) Thái Sơn Nam
10	FP	Vũ Đức Tùng	3 January 1995 (aged 23)	(Vietnam Football Federation) Thái Sơn Bắc
11	FP	Trần Văn Vũ (Captain)	30 May 1990 (aged 27)	(Vietnam Football Federation) Thái Sơn Nam
12	FP	Khống Đình Hùng	11 November 1989 (aged 28)	(Vietnam Football Federation) Sanest Khánh Hòa
13	FP	Đinh Văn Toàn	20 October 1997 (aged 20)	(Vietnam Football Federation) Hải Phương Nam
14	FP	Nguyễn Đắc Huy	10 May 1991 (aged 26)	(Vietnam Football Federation) Thai Son Nam

=== Malaysia ===
Malaysia named their squad on 1 February 2018.

Head coach: Chiew Chun Yong

No.	Pos.	Player	Date of birth (age)	Club
1	GK	Firdaus Razali	25 April 1984 (aged 33)	(Football Association of Malaysia) MPSJ
12	GK	Azrul Hadee	7 March 1987 (aged 30)	(Football Association of Malaysia) KL Marcerra United
3	FP	Nurasyraaf Azle		(Football Association of Malaysia) KL City
4	FP	Farikh Rahman	21 January 1997 (aged 21)	(Football Association of Malaysia) Perak FA
5	FP	Awalluddin Nawi	2 February 1998 (aged 19)	(Football Association of Malaysia) Perak FA
6	FP	Ridzwan Bakri	25 August 1994 (aged 23)	(Football Association of Malaysia) Sabah
7	FP	Khairul Effendy	3 December 1987 (aged 30)	(Football Association of Indonesia) SKN FC Kebumen
8	FP	Saiful Aula	1 February 1992 (aged 26)	(Football Association of Malaysia) Melaka
9	FP	Azwann Ismail	4 October 1991 (aged 26)	(Football Association of Malaysia) FELDA United
10	FP	Aizad Daniel	1 February 1996 (aged 22)	(Football Association of Malaysia) MPSJ
11	FP	Aidil Shahril	23 April 1997 (aged 20)	(Football Association of Malaysia) MPSJ
12	FP	Abu Haniffa	22 February 1991 (aged 26)	(Football Association of Malaysia) Melaka
13	FP	Saiful Nizam	13 October 1991 (aged 26)	(Football Association of Malaysia) Melaka
14	FP	Yazid Kamaruzuan	7 April 1992 (aged 25)	(Football Association of Malaysia) Kuantan Rangers

=== Bahrain ===
Head coach: Adel Marzooq

No.	Pos.	Player	Date of birth (age)	Club
1	GK	Sayed Fadhel	31 July 1987 (aged 30)	(Bahrain Football Association) Al-Shabab
2	GK	Yusuf Abdulla	17 August 1987 (aged 30)	(Bahrain Football Association) Al-Najma
14	GK	Sayed Mohamed	7 May 1986 (aged 31)	
3	FP	Ali Al-Malki		
4	FP	Falah Abbas	22 January 1991 (aged 27)	(Bahrain Football Association) Al-Shabab
5	FP	Sayed Hashem		(Bahrain Football Association) Al-Shabab
6	FP	Ali Saleh		(Bahrain Football Association) Al-Najma
7	FP	Abdullah Al-Malki		(Bahrain Football Association) Al-Najma
8	FP	Mohamed Al-Sandi	26 September 1988 (aged 29)	(Bahrain Football Association) Al-Najma
9	FP	Mohammed Abdulla	28 November 1990 (aged 27)	(Bahrain Football Association) Al-Shabab
10	FP	Jassam Saleh	21 August 1989 (aged 28)	(Bahrain Football Association) Al-Najma
11	FP	Ahmed Abdulnabi	9 October 1993 (aged 24)	(Bahrain Football Association) Al-Shabab
12	FP	Salman Maula	4 April 1993 (aged 24)	(Bahrain Football Association) Al-Najma
13	FP	Ahmed Darwish		(Bahrain Football Association) Al-Sanabis

== Group B ==
=== Uzbekistan ===
Uzbekistan named their squad on 29 January 2018.

Head coach: Bakhodir Akhmedov

No.	Pos.	Player	Date of birth (age)	Club
1	GK	Rustam Umarov	26 May 1984 (aged 33)	(Uzbekistan Football Association) Ardus
12	GK	Akmaljon Khazratkulov	31 March 1990 (aged 27)	(Uzbekistan Football Association) Pakhtakor
2	FP	Anaskhon Rakhmatov	20 June 1994 (aged 23)	(Uzbekistan Football Association) Ardus
3	FP	Mashrab Adilov	15 August 1994 (aged 23)	(Uzbekistan Football Association) Ardus
4	FP	Ikhtiyor Ropiev	19 September 1993 (aged 24)	(Uzbekistan Football Association) Maksam Chirchik
5	FP	Dilmurod Shavkatov	26 August 1994 (aged 23)	(Uzbekistan Football Association) Ardus
6	FP	Ilhomjon Hamroev	25 September 1997 (aged 20)	(Uzbekistan Football Association) Ardus
7	FP	Dilshod Rakhmatov	4 December 1989 (aged 28)	(Chinese Football Association) Dalian Yuan Dynasty
8	FP	Farkhod Abdumavlyanov	12 November 1987 (aged 30)	(Uzbekistan Football Association) Almalyk
9	FP	Davronjon Abdurakhmanov	19 November 1992 (aged 25)	(Uzbekistan Football Association) Almalyk
10	FP	Davron Choriev	1 January 1993 (aged 25)	(Uzbekistan Football Association) Ardus
11	FP	Artur Yunusov	8 October 1987 (aged 30)	(Uzbekistan Football Association) Lokomotiv
13	FP	Khusniddin Nishonov	19 May 1998 (aged 19)	(Uzbekistan Football Association) Nafis
14	FP	Konstantin Sviridov	11 March 1988 (aged 29)	(Uzbekistan Football Association) Almalyk

=== Japan ===
Japan named their squad on 16 January 2018.

Head coach: (Spain) Bruno Garcia Formoso

No.	Pos.	Player	Date of birth (age)	Club
1	GK	Yushi Sekiguchi	24 October 1991 (aged 26)	(Japan Football Association) Nagoya Oceans
2	GK	Higor Pires	7 July 1980 (aged 37)	(Japan Football Association) Pescadola Machida
16	GK	Daimu Yazawa	27 February 1994 (aged 23)	(Japan Football Association) Fugador Sumida
3	FP	Yuki Murota	13 April 1992 (aged 25)	(Japan Football Association) Pescadola Machida
4	FP	Koichi Saito	25 August 1994 (aged 23)	(Japan Football Association) Nagoya Oceans
5	FP	Minamoto Akira	28 January 1987 (aged 31)	(Japan Football Association) Fuchu Athletic
6	FP	Tomoki Yoshikawa	3 February 1989 (aged 28)	(Japan Football Association) Nagoya Oceans
7	FP	Rafael Henmi	30 July 1992 (aged 25)	(Portuguese Football Federation) Benfica
8	FP	Manabu Takita	26 July 1986 (aged 31)	(Japan Football Association) Pescadola Machida
9	FP	Kaoru Morioka	7 April 1979 (aged 38)	(Japan Football Association) Pescadola Machida
10	FP	Kazuhiro Nibuya	13 December 1987 (aged 30)	(Japan Football Association) Vasagey Oita
11	FP	Shota Hoshi	17 November 1985 (aged 32)	(Japan Football Association) Bardral Urayasu
12	FP	Kazuya Shimizu	6 February 1997 (aged 20)	(Japan Football Association) Fugador Sumida
13	FP	Tomoaki Watanabe	29 April 1986 (aged 31)	(Japan Football Association) Fuchu Athletic
14	FP	Ryosuke Nishitani	31 January 1986 (aged 32)	(Japan Football Association) Nagoya Oceans
15	FP	Minami Kato	20 December 1992 (aged 25)	(Japan Football Association) Shriker Osaka

=== Tajikistan ===
Tajikistan named their squad on 23 January 2018.

Head coach: Hussein Shodyev

No.	Pos.	Player	Date of birth (age)	Club
1	GK	Firuz Bekmurodov	10 January 1998 (aged 20)	(Tajikistan Football Federation) Disi Invest
2	GK	Murodullo Alikulov	9 June 1987 (aged 30)	(Tajikistan Football Federation) Sino
3	FP	Iqboli Vositzoda	8 May 1998 (aged 19)	(Tajikistan Football Federation) Sipar
4	FP	Bahodur Khojaev		(Tajikistan Football Federation) Sadova
5	FP	Sobirdzhon Gulyakov	8 February 1998 (aged 19)	(Tajikistan Football Federation) Disi Invest
6	FP	Rahmonali Sharipov	1 September 1994 (aged 23)	(Tajikistan Football Federation) Disi Invest
7	FP	Rustam Hamidov		(Kyrgyz Football Union) Sun City
8	FP	Shavqat Halimov	15 November 1997 (aged 20)	(Tajikistan Football Federation) Disi Invest
9	FP	Fayzali Sardorov	8 April 1998 (aged 19)	(Tajikistan Football Federation) Sipar
10	FP	Nekruz Alimakhmadov	10 August 1995 (aged 22)	(Tajikistan Football Federation) Sipar
11	FP	Firuz Sangov	10 April 1996 (aged 21)	(Tajikistan Football Federation) Soro Company
12	FP	Umed Kuziev	17 December 1997 (aged 20)	(Tajikistan Football Federation) Disi Invest
13	FP	Muhamadjon Sharipov	12 September 1997 (aged 20)	(Tajikistan Football Federation) Sipar
14	FP	Dilshod Salomov	5 October 1995 (aged 22)	(Tajikistan Football Federation) Disi Invest

=== South Korea ===
South Korea named their squad on 25 January 2018.

Head coach: Lee Sang-jin

No.	Pos.	Player	Date of birth (age)	Club
1	GK	Seo Jung-woo	20 June 1990 (aged 27)	(Korea Football Association) FS Seoul
4	GK	Kim Jun-ho	5 February 1993 (aged 24)	(Korea Football Association) Fantasia Bucheon
2	FP	Jang Yeong-cheol	26 October 1992 (aged 25)	(Korea Football Association) Yes Gumi
3	FP	Park Young-jae	5 August 1991 (aged 26)	(Korea Football Association) Seoul Eunpyeong
5	FP	Lim Yeong-seung	5 July 1994 (aged 23)	(Korea Football Association) FS Seoul
6	FP	Lee Doo-yong	4 February 1988 (aged 29)	(Korea Football Association) Fantasia Bucheon
7	FP	Kim Min-kuk	17 February 1987 (aged 30)	(Korea Football Association) FS Seoul
8	FP	Jeong Soo-in	20 March 1992 (aged 25)	(Korea Football Association) Yes Gumi
9	FP	Cho Byung-girl	5 April 1992 (aged 25)	(Korea Football Association) Jeonju MAG
10	FP	Lee Min-yong	25 September 1984 (aged 33)	(Korea Football Association) Yongin
11	FP	Chun Jin-woo	21 November 1987 (aged 30)	(Korea Football Association) Yes Gumi
12	FP	Lee Ahn	23 September 1993 (aged 24)	(Korea Football Association) Yes Gumi
13	FP	You Sang-yun	3 July 1989 (aged 28)	(Korea Football Association) Dream Hub Gunsan
14	FP	Park Han-ul	29 August 1985 (aged 32)	(Korea Football Association) FS Seoul

== Group C ==
=== Iran ===
Iran named their squad on 28 January 2018.

Head coach: Mohammad Nazemasharieh

No.	Pos.	Player	Date of birth (age)	Club
1	GK	Sepehr Mohammadi	8 August 1989 (aged 28)	(Football Federation Islamic Republic of Iran) Giti Pasand
2	GK	Alireza Samimi	29 June 1987 (aged 30)	(Football Federation Islamic Republic of Iran) Mes Sungun
3	FP	Ahmad Esmaeilpour	8 September 1988 (aged 29)	(Football Federation Islamic Republic of Iran) Giti Pasand
4	FP	Moslem Oladghobad	29 November 1995 (aged 22)	(Football Federation Islamic Republic of Iran) Heyat Football
5	FP	Alireza Rafieipour	9 October 1993 (aged 24)	(Football Federation Islamic Republic of Iran) Sherkat Melli Haffari
6	FP	Mohammad Reza Sangsefidi	2 November 1989 (aged 28)	(Football Federation Islamic Republic of Iran) Tasisat Daryaei
7	FP	Ali Asghar Hassanzadeh	2 November 1987 (aged 30)	(Football Federation Islamic Republic of Iran) Giti Pasand
8	FP	Abolghasem Orouji	2 December 1989 (aged 28)	(Football Federation Islamic Republic of Iran) Giti Pasand
9	FP	Saeid Ahmadabbasi	31 July 1992 (aged 25)	(Football Federation Islamic Republic of Iran) Giti Pasand
10	FP	Hossein Tayyebi	29 September 1988 (aged 29)	(Kazakhstan Football Federation) Kairat Almaty
11	FP	Mehran Alighadr	24 May 1989 (aged 28)	(Football Federation Islamic Republic of Iran) Giti Pasand
12	FP	Mohammad Shajari	30 August 1991 (aged 26)	(Football Federation Islamic Republic of Iran) Tasisat Daryaei
13	FP	Farhad Tavakoli	13 January 1989 (aged 29)	(Football Federation Islamic Republic of Iran) Sherkat Melli Haffari
14	FP	Mahdi Javid	3 May 1987 (aged 30)	(Football Federation Islamic Republic of Iran) Tasisat Daryaei

=== Iraq ===
Iraq named their squad on 29 January 2018.

Head coach: Haitham Abbas Bawei

No.	Pos.	Player	Date of birth (age)	Club
1	GK	Yahya Abdulnoor		
13	GK	Zaher Mahdi		
2	FP	Mustafa Bachay	14 January 1992 (aged 26)	(Iraq Football Association) Naft Al-Wasat
3	FP	Firas Mohammed	1 November 1982 (aged 35)	(Iraq Football Association) Naft Al-Wasat
4	FP	Tareq Zeyad		
5	FP	Hussein Al-Zubiaidi	4 August 1979 (aged 38)	
6	FP	Zaid Ali		
7	FP	Salim Faisal	16 January 1995 (aged 23)	(Iraq Football Association) Naft Al-Wasat
8	FP	Ghaith Riyadh		
9	FP	Hassan Ali Jabar	13 January 1989 (aged 29)	
10	FP	Hasan Dakheel	1 June 1992 (aged 25)	(Iraq Football Association) Naft Al-Wasat
11	FP	Rafid Hameed	9 January 1993 (aged 25)	(Iraq Football Association) Naft Al-Wasat
12	FP	Zainal Abdeen	13 December 1995 (aged 22)	
14	FP	Waleed Khalid	29 June 1992 (aged 25)	(Iraq Football Association) Naft Al-Wasat

=== China PR ===
Head coach: (Italy) Sergio Gargelli

No.	Pos.	Player	Date of birth (age)	Club
1	GK	Zhu Bei	12 February 1991 (aged 26)	(Chinese Football Association) Wuhan Dilong
12	GK	Zhou Fan	17 June 1996 (aged 21)	(Chinese Football Association) Dalian Yuan Dynasty
2	FP	Zhang Bin	19 April 1988 (aged 29)	(Chinese Football Association) Nei Mongol Xuelang
3	FP	Li Shunying	21 October 1993 (aged 24)	(Chinese Football Association) Zhuhai Mingshi
4	FP	Li Zhiheng	21 November 1993 (aged 24)	(Chinese Football Association) Dalian Yuan Dynasty
5	FP	Zhuang Jianfa	23 July 1991 (aged 26)	(Chinese Football Association) Shenzhen Nanling
6	FP	Xu Yang	14 February 1993 (aged 24)	(Chinese Football Association) Wuhan Dilong
7	FP	Zhao Liang	26 March 1988 (aged 29)	(Chinese Football Association) Dalian Yuan Dynasty
8	FP	Li Jianjia	16 August 1986 (aged 31)	(Chinese Football Association) Shenzhen Nanling
9	FP	Gu Haitao	12 May 1991 (aged 26)	(Chinese Football Association) Shenzhen Nanling
10	FP	Lin Yuchen	9 January 1993 (aged 25)	(Chinese Football Association) Dalian Yuan Dynasty
11	FP	Shen Siming	26 July 1995 (aged 22)	(Chinese Football Association) Dalian Yuan Dynasty
13	FP	Peng Boyao	24 September 1992 (aged 25)	(Chinese Football Association) Dalian Yuan Dynasty
14	FP	Zhang Yameng	9 August 1990 (aged 27)	(Chinese Football Association) Zhuhai Mingshi

=== Myanmar ===
Head coach: Htay Myint

No.	Pos.	Player	Date of birth (age)	Club
1	GK	Yan Paing Hein	7 August 1998 (aged 19)	(Myanmar Football Federation) MIC
2	GK	Zwe Pyae Sone	18 October 1994 (aged 23)	(Myanmar Football Federation) GV Athletic
3	FP	Ko Ko Lwin	4 November 1996 (aged 21)	(Myanmar Football Federation) MIC
4	FP	Kaung Chit Thu	22 February 1991 (aged 26)	(Myanmar Football Federation) GV Athletic
5	FP	Hein Min Soe	7 May 1990 (aged 27)	(Myanmar Football Federation) MIC
6	FP	Naing Ye Kyaw	24 April 1993 (aged 24)	(Myanmar Football Federation) MIC
7	FP	Myo Myint Soe	16 May 1991 (aged 26)	(Myanmar Football Federation) Pyay United
8	FP	Sai Pyone Aung	27 November 1992 (aged 25)	(Myanmar Football Federation) Pyay United
9	FP	Pyae Phyo Maung (3)	15 November 1988 (aged 29)	(Myanmar Football Federation) Pyay United
10	FP	Khin Zaw Lin	11 July 1993 (aged 24)	(Myanmar Football Federation) MIC
11	FP	Nyein Min Soe	19 May 1996 (aged 21)	(Myanmar Football Federation) Pyay United
12	FP	Ye Lin Tun	16 September 1998 (aged 19)	
13	FP	Aung Zin Oo	19 December 1993 (aged 24)	(Myanmar Football Federation) Pyay United
14	FP	Pyae Phyo Maung (2)	9 January 1992 (aged 26)	(Myanmar Football Federation) MIC

== Group D ==
=== Thailand ===
Thailand named their squad on 29 January 2018.

Head coach: (Spain) Pulpis

No.	Pos.	Player	Date of birth (age)	Club
1	GK	Kanison Phoopun	11 November 1991 (aged 26)	(Football Association of Thailand) Port
12	GK	Katawut Hankampa	27 May 1992 (aged 25)	(Football Association of Thailand) Chonburi Bluewave
2	FP	Peerapol Satsue	8 May 1992 (aged 25)	(Football Association of Thailand) Bangkok BTS
3	FP	Natthapon Suttiroj	27 January 1983 (aged 35)	(Football Association of Thailand) Chonburi Bluewave
4	FP	Nawin Rattanawongsawat	21 September 1992 (aged 25)	(Football Association of Thailand) Bangkok BTS
5	FP	Ronnachai Jungwongsuk	4 March 1997 (aged 20)	(Football Association of Thailand) Chonburi Bluewave
6	FP	Jirawat Sornwichian	25 October 1988 (aged 29)	(Football Association of Thailand) Chonburi Bluewave
7	FP	Kritsada Wongkaeo	29 April 1988 (aged 29)	(Football Association of Thailand) Chonburi Bluewave
8	FP	Jetsada Chudech	20 February 1989 (aged 28)	(Football Association of Thailand) Rajnavy
9	FP	Suphawut Thueanklang	14 July 1989 (aged 28)	(Football Association of Thailand) Chonburi Bluewave
10	FP	Nattawut Madyalan	12 April 1990 (aged 27)	(Football Association of Thailand) Chonburi Bluewave
11	FP	Muhammad Osamanmusa	19 January 1998 (aged 20)	(Football Association of Thailand) Bangkok BTS
13	FP	Chaivit Jamgrajang	13 November 1989 (aged 28)	(Football Association of Thailand) Port
14	FP	Apiwat Chaemcharoen	31 March 1991 (aged 26)	(Football Association of Thailand) Chonburi Bluewave

=== Kyrgyzstan ===
Kyrgyzstan named their squad on 31 January 2018.

Head coach: Amirzhan Mukanov

No.	Pos.	Player	Date of birth (age)	Club
1	GK	Kirill Ermolov	6 October 1984 (aged 33)	(Kyrgyz Football Union) Osh EREM
2	GK	Aktilek Esenaliev		
3	FP	Iuldashbai Salimbaev		
4	FP	Arstanbek Tursunov	16 December 1998 (aged 19)	
5	FP	Kelkel Anarbekov	11 December 1989 (aged 28)	
6	FP	Manas Abdrasul Uulu	13 August 1995 (aged 22)	(Kyrgyz Football Union) Osh EREM
7	FP	Dastan Rysbekov		(Kyrgyz Football Union) Emgek
8	FP	Adilet Imanbekov		(Kyrgyz Football Union) Alga Bishkek
9	FP	Maksat Alimov	3 August 1990 (aged 27)	(Kyrgyz Football Union) Osh EREM
10	FP	Ulanbek Baigazy Uulu	7 December 1993 (aged 24)	(Kyrgyz Football Union) Osh EREM
11	FP	Adilet Kultaev	27 February 1986 (aged 31)	(Kyrgyz Football Union) Osh EREM
12	FP	Aktai Tashtanov	10 January 1998 (aged 20)	(Kyrgyz Football Union) Nurfinans
13	FP	Mirlan Zholdubaev	13 July 1999 (aged 18)	
14	FP	Emil Kanetov	21 April 1985 (aged 32)	(Kyrgyz Football Union) Osh EREM

=== Lebanon ===
Lebanon named their squad on 27 January 2018.

Head coach: (Iran) Shahab Sofalmanesh

No.	Pos.	Player	Date of birth (age)	Club
1	GK	Hussein Hamadani	23 June 1984 (aged 33)	(Lebanese Football Association) Bank of Beirut
2	GK	Ghadi Abi Akl	9 April 1996 (aged 21)	(Lebanese Football Association) Shabab Al Ashrafieh
13	GK	Karim Joueidi		(Lebanese Football Association) Shabab Al Ashrafieh
3	FP	Mohammad Abou Zeid		(Lebanese Football Association) Army
4	FP	Mustafa Rhyem	1 October 1993 (aged 24)	
5	FP	Ahmad Kheir El-Dine	7 July 1995 (aged 22)	(Lebanese Football Association) Bank of Beirut
6	FP	Ali El-Homsi	20 October 1985 (aged 32)	(Lebanese Football Association) Bank of Beirut
7	FP	Hassan Zeitoun	15 February 1988 (aged 29)	(Lebanese Football Association) Al Fayhaa Tripoli
8	FP	Kassem Kawsan	1 October 1985 (aged 32)	(Lebanese Football Association) Al Fayhaa Tripoli
9	FP	Mouhammad Hammoud	7 June 1997 (aged 20)	(Lebanese Football Association) Bank of Beirut
10	FP	Ali Tneich	16 July 1992 (aged 25)	(Lebanese Football Association) Bank of Beirut
11	FP	Mohamad Kobeissy	1 October 1988 (aged 29)	(Lebanese Football Association) Bank of Beirut
12	FP	Karim Abou Zeid	11 January 1991 (aged 27)	(Lebanese Football Association) Bank of Beirut
14	FP	Moustafa Serhan	31 May 1989 (aged 28)	(Lebanese Football Association) Bank of Beirut

=== Jordan ===
Jordan named their squad on 25 January 2018.

Head coach: Saleh Abu Jafer

No.	Pos.	Player	Date of birth (age)	Club
1	GK	Yusef Ayasrah	31 December 1987 (aged 30)	(Jordan Football Association) Shocair
12	GK	Aledres Hasan		
14	GK	Majed Al-Hafi	26 June 1983 (aged 34)	(Jordan Football Association) Hamadah
2	FP	Majdi Qandeel	20 August 1986 (aged 31)	
3	FP	Qais Shabib	8 September 1996 (aged 21)	(Jordan Football Association) Shocair
4	FP	Mutaz Mohammad		
5	FP	Abdel Samara	14 August 1992 (aged 25)	(Jordan Football Association) Rusefa
6	FP	Musa Abu Shaikha	3 September 1994 (aged 23)	
7	FP	Ahmed Arab	18 December 1980 (aged 37)	(Jordan Football Association) Amman Municipality
8	FP	Yousef Al-Awadat	8 December 1989 (aged 28)	
9	FP	Ibrahim Qandeel	2 January 1987 (aged 31)	
10	FP	Samer Naser	26 January 1990 (aged 28)	(Chinese Football Association) Wuhan Dilong
11	FP	Amjed Al-Qorom	18 September 1988 (aged 29)	(Jordan Football Association) Shabab Al-Ordon
13	FP	Waleed Abed Ashour		
