= 2010–11 FK-League =

FK-League
- Season: 2010–11
- Champions: FS Seoul (1st title)
- Matches: 30
- Goals: 258 (8.6 per match)
- Best Player: Heo Chang-woo
- Top goalscorer: Shin Jong-hoon
- Best goalkeeper: Heo Myung-beom

The 2010–11 FK-League was the second season of the FK-League, the semi-professional futsal league in South Korea. The season began on 3 December 2010, and ended on 5 March 2011. All matches were played at Yongin Gymnasium, Yongin.

== Teams ==
- Jeonju MAG
- FS Seoul
- Seoul Gwangjin
- Yes Gumi
- Yongin FS

== League table ==
| Pos | Team | Pld | W | D | L | GF | GA | GD | Pts |
|---|---|---|---|---|---|---|---|---|---|
| 1 | FS Seoul (C) | 12 | 9 | 1 | 2 | 79 | 32 | +47 | 28 |
| 2 | Jeonju MAG | 12 | 8 | 3 | 1 | 46 | 33 | +13 | 27 |
| 3 | Yes Gumi | 12 | 5 | 1 | 6 | 42 | 54 | −12 | 16 |
| 4 | Yongin FS | 12 | 2 | 2 | 8 | 50 | 73 | −23 | 8 |
| 5 | Seoul Gwangjin | 12 | 1 | 3 | 8 | 41 | 66 | −25 | 6 |

== Awards ==
- Most Valuable Player: Heo Chang-woo (FS Seoul)
- Top goalscorer: Shin Jong-hoon (FS Seoul)
- Best Goalkeeper: Heo Myung-beom (FS Seoul)
- Best Manager: Lee Chang-hwan (FS Seoul)
- Fair Play Award: Yongin FS
