= 2012–13 FK-League =

FK-League
- Season: 2012–13
- Champions: Jeonju MAG (2nd title)
- Matches: 72
- Goals: 694 (9.64 per match)
- Best Player: Kim Ho-jin
- Top goalscorer: Choi Gyeong-jin
- Best goalkeeper: Han Min-gyu

The 2012–13 FK-League was the fourth season of the FK-League, the South Korean semi-professional futsal league. The season began on 24 November 2012, and ended on 23 March 2013.

== Teams ==
- Daegu Five Stars
- Seoul Gwangjin
- Seoul Eunpyeong
- FS Seoul
- Yes Gumi
- Yongin FS
- Jeonju MAG
- Chungbuk Jecheon
- Fantasia Bucheon

== Regular season ==
Pos	Team	Pld	W	D	L	GF	GA	GD	Pts	Qualification
1	Jeonju MAG	16	11	3	2	108	36	+72	36	Advance to play-offs final
2	Yongin FS	16	10	2	4	91	73	+18	32	Advance to play-offs semi-final
3	Chungbuk Jecheon	16	9	3	4	78	59	+19	30	Advance to play-offs first round
4	Daegu Five Stars	16	9	2	5	87	71	+16	29	Advance to play-offs first round
5	Fantasia Bucheon	16	7	4	5	59	61	−2	25	
6	Seoul Eunpyeong	16	5	4	7	86	90	−4	19	
7	Seoul Gwangjin	16	4	3	9	71	108	−37	15	
8	FS Seoul	16	3	2	11	54	96	−42	11	
9	Yes Gumi	16	2	1	13	60	100	−40	7	

== Championship play-offs ==
=== Bracket ===
First round
3	Chungbuk Jecheon	3
4	Daegu Five Stars	2

Semi-final
2	Yongin FS	1
Chungbuk Jecheon	2

Final
1	Jeonju MAG	6	6	12
Chungbuk Jecheon	3	3	6

=== First round ===
9 March 2013

Chungbuk Jecheon	3–2	Daegu Five Stars
Kim Do-hwan 7'; Kang Gyeong-mook 12'; Lee Hak-jin 33'	Report	Seo Dae-yoon 2'; Kim Do-hwan 10' (o.g.)

=== Semi-final ===
10 March 2013

Yongin FS	1–2	Chungbuk Jecheon
Kim Yoon-seong 40'	Report	Kang Gyeong-mook 28'; Kim Do-hwan 30'

=== Final ===
16 March 2013

Jeonju MAG	6–3	Chungbuk Jecheon
Lee Ji-hyeon 5'; Hwang Woon 15'; Oh Hyeon-jong 16', 18'; Kim Ho-jin 35', 36'	Report	Kim Hye-soo 2', 26'; Choi Byeong-joon 8'

17 March 2013

Chungbuk Jecheon	3–6	Jeonju MAG
Kang Gyeong-mook 4'; Lee Hak-jin 6'; Choi Byeong-joon 25'	Report	Oh Hyeon-jong 4', 17'; Kim Ho-jin 12'; Kim Jeong-nam 17'; Lee Ji-hyeon 27'; Kang Gyeong-mook 37' (o.g.)

Jeonju MAG won 12–6 on aggregate.
