= 2013–14 FK-League =

FK-League
- Season: 2013–14
- Champions: Jeonju MAG (3rd title)
- Best Player: Shin Jong-hoon
- Top goalscorer: Choi Gyeong-jin
- Best goalkeeper: Han Min-gyu

The 2013–14 FK-League was the fourth season of the FK-League, the South Korean semi-professional futsal league. The season began on 30 November 2013, and ended on 23 March 2014. Jeonju MAG became the champions, winning their second consecutive title, and their third title overall.

== Regular season ==
=== Group A ===
Pos	Team	Pld	W	D	L	GF	GA	GD	Pts	Qualification
1	Jeonju MAG	16	16	0	0	165	27	+138	48	Advance to play-offs
2	Fantasia Bucheon	16	11	0	5	108	51	+57	33	Advance to play-offs
3	Seoul Gwangjin	16	6	2	8	106	98	+8	20	
4	Daegu Five Stars	16	5	1	10	96	93	+3	16	
5	Dream Hub Gunsan	16	5	11	11	92	99	−7	15	
6	Seoul FITF	16	1	0	15	49	262	−213	3	

=== Group B ===
Pos	Team	Pld	W	D	L	GF	GA	GD	Pts	Qualification
1	Chungbuk Jecheon	16	11	2	3	125	51	+74	35	Advance to play-offs
2	Seoul Eunpyeong	16	11	1	4	135	73	+62	34	Advance to play-offs
3	Yongin FS	16	11	0	5	115	66	+49	33	
4	FS Seoul	16	9	3	4	101	56	+45	30	
5	Yes Gumi	16	5	1	10	71	93	−22	16	
6	IFC Daejeon	16	0	0	16	35	224	−189	0	

== Championship play-offs ==
Semi-finals
A1	Jeonju MAG	5
B2	Seoul Eunpyeong	3
B1	Chungbuk Jecheon (a.e.t.)	1
A2	Fantasia Bucheon	0

Final
Jeonju MAG	3	4	7
Chungbuk Jecheon	1	1	2

== Awards ==
- Most Valuable Player: Shin Jong-hoon (Jeonju MAG)
- Top goalscorer: Choi Gyeong-jin (Seoul Eunpyeong, 70 goals)
- Best Goalkeeper: Han Min-gyu (Jeonju MAG)
- Fair Play Award: Seoul FITF
