= List of top-division futsal clubs in UEFA countries =

UEFA countries on this map of the world's six football confederations

The Union of European Football Associations (UEFA) is the administrative and controlling body for European futsal. It consists of 54 member associations, each of which is responsible for governing futsal in their respective countries.

All widely recognize sovereign states located entirely within Europe are members, with the exceptions of the United Kingdom, Monaco and Vatican City. Eight states partially or entirely outside of Europe are also members: Armenia, Azerbaijan, Russia, Georgia, Kazakhstan, Israel, Cyprus and Turkey.

The United Kingdom is divided into the four separate football associations of England, Northern Ireland, Scotland, and Wales; each association has a separate UEFA membership.

Each UEFA member has its own futsal league system, except Liechtenstein. Clubs playing in each top-level league compete for the title as the country's club champions. Clubs also compete in the league or national cup competitions for places in the following season's UEFA club competitions, the UEFA Futsal Champions League.

== UEFA coefficients ==
The UEFA league coefficients, also known as the UEFA rankings, are used to rank the leagues of Europe, and thus determine the number of clubs from a league that will participate in UEFA Futsal Cup.

A country's ranking is calculated based on the results of its clubs in UEFA competitions over the past five seasons. Two points are awarded for each win by a club, and one for a draw. If a game goes to extra time, the result at the end of time is used to calculate ranking points; if the match goes to a penalty shootout, it is considered to be a draw for the purposes of the coefficient system. The number of points awarded to a country's clubs are added together, and then divided by the number of clubs that participated in European competitions that season.

== Albania ==
- Country: Albania
- Association: Football Association of Albania
- Top-level league: Albanian Futsal Championship
- UEFA ranking:

Clubs and locations as of the 2013–14 season:

Location of 2013–14 Albanian league.

Pos	Team	Pld	W	D	L	GF	GA	GD	Pts	Qualification or relegation
1	Flamurtari	9	7	2	0	41	17	+24	23	2014–15 UEFA Futsal Cup
2	Ali Demi	10	7	1	2	42	24	+18	22	
3	Tirana	10	6	3	1	44	28	+16	21	
4	Edro Vlorë	9	4	1	4	32	26	+6	13	
5	Vllaznia Futsal	9	2	1	6	21	30	−9	7	
6	Teuta	9	2	0	7	28	52	−24	6	
7	Flabina	10	1	0	9	33	64	−31	3	

Updated to match(es) played on 01/03/2014. Source: UEFA.com
Rules for classification: 1) points; 2) goal difference; 3) number of goals scored.

== Andorra ==
- Country: Andorra
- Association: Andorran Football Federation
- Top-level league: Primera Divisió (futsal)
- UEFA ranking:

Clubs and locations as of the 2013–14 season:

Location of teams in the 2013–14 Primera Divisió

Pos	Team	Pld	W	D	L	GF	GA	GD	Pts	Qualification or relegation
1	FC Encamp	14	14	0	0	107	26	+81	42	Play-off
2	FC Madriu	14	7	3	4	56	49	+7	24	Play-off
3	Pas de la Casa	14	7	2	5	53	46	+7	23	Play-off
4	UE Extremenya	14	6	3	5	55	54	+1	21	Play-off
5	CE Casa Portugal	14	5	1	8	51	58	−7	16	Play-out
6	FS La Massana	14	5	0	9	50	64	−14	15	Play-out
7	Inter Club Escaldes	14	3	2	9	44	84	−40	11	Play-out
8	CE Sacalma Blues	14	2	3	9	36	71	−35	9	Play-out

Updated to match(es) played on 01/03/2014. Source: UEFA.com
Rules for classification: 1) points; 2) goal difference; 3) number of goals scored.

== Armenia ==
- Country: Armenia
- Association: Football Federation of Armenia
- Top-level league: Armenian Futsal Premier League
- UEFA Ranking:

Clubs and locations as of the 2013–14 season:

Location of teams in the 2013–14 Armenian League

Pos	Team	Pld	W	D	L	GF	GA	GD	Pts	Qualification or relegation
1	Talgrig Yerevan	9	7	0	2	79	26	+53	21	2014–15 UEFA Futsal Cup
2	Politechnik	9	4	1	4	61	51	+10	13	
3	FC Gyumri	8	4	1	3	51	58	−7	13	
4	Hrazdan	8	1	0	7	32	88	−56	3	

Updated to match(es) played on 01/03/2014. Source: UEFA.com
Rules for classification: 1) points; 2) goal difference; 3) number of goals scored.

== Austria ==
- Country: Austria
- Association: Austrian Football Association
- Top-level league: Austrian Futsal Liga
- UEFA ranking:

Clubs and locations as of the 2013–14 season:

Location of teams in the 2013–14 Austrian league

Pos	Team	Pld	W	D	L	GF	GA	GD	Pts	Qualification or relegation
1	Futsal Schwaz	18	16	1	1	127	49	+78	49	2014–15 UEFA Futsal Cup
2	Allstars Wiener Neustadt	18	13	1	4	112	57	+55	40	
3	Stella Rossa Wien	18	12	2	4	102	40	+62	38	
4	Vienna International	18	9	3	6	94	50	+44	30	
5	Dynamo Triestingtal	18	8	1	9	113	82	+31	25	
6	Futsal Klagenfurt	18	7	3	8	90	74	+16	24	
7	Futsal Innsbruck	18	5	4	9	58	73	−15	19	
8	Polonia Wien	18	4	4	10	49	110	−61	16	
9	Futsal Vienna	18	2	3	13	52	140	−88	9	
10	SV Georgia	18	2	2	14	57	179	−122	8	Relegation

Updated to match(es) played on 01/03/2014. Source: UEFA.com
Rules for classification: 1) points; 2) goal difference; 3) number of goals scored.

== Azerbaijan ==
- Country: Azerbaijan
- Association: Association of Football Federations of Azerbaijan
- Top-level league: Azerbaijan Premier League (futsal)
- UEFA ranking:

Clubs and locations as of the 2013–14 season:

Location of teams in the 2013–14 Azerbaijan Premier League

Pos	Team	Pld	W	D	L	GF	GA	GD	Pts	Qualification or relegation
1	Araz Naxçivan	14	14	0	0	130	24	+106	42	2014–15 UEFA Futsal Cup
2	Fenerbagca	14	10	1	3	111	31	+80	31	
3	Neftchi Baku	13	10	0	3	138	30	+108	30	
4	Ekol Baku	13	8	1	4	75	24	+51	25	
5	Baku Fire	14	4	2	8	36	40	−4	14	
6	Baku Flames	14	4	2	8	49	69	−20	14	
7	Qarabag V. Agdam	14	2	0	12	22	168	−146	6	
8	PSL	14	0	0	14	13	188	−175	0	Relegation

Updated to match(es) played on 01/03/2014. Source: UEFA.com
Rules for classification: 1) points; 2) goal difference; 3) number of goals scored.

== Belarus ==
- Country: Belarus
- Association: Football Federation of Belarus
- Top-level league: Belarusian Futsal Premier League
- UEFA ranking:

Clubs and locations as of the 2014 season:

Locations of teams in the 2014 Belarusian Premier League

Pos	Team	Pld	W	D	L	GF	GA	GD	Pts	Qualification or relegation
1	Mapid Minsk	21	20	0	1	106	43	+63	60	2014–15 UEFA Futsal Cup
2	Lidselmash Lida	21	17	3	1	93	30	+63	54	
3	BC Gomel	21	18	0	3	86	41	+45	54	
4	MFK VitEn Vitebsk	21	14	4	3	85	36	+49	46	
5	FC Dorozhnik Minsk	21	12	2	7	68	38	+30	38	
6	Borisov-900 Borisov	21	12	0	9	75	57	+18	36	
7	Stolitsa	21	10	2	9	70	56	+14	32	
8	FC Granit Mikashevichi	21	9	2	10	88	90	−2	29	
9	BTEU Gomel	21	9	1	11	99	101	−2	28	
10	CKK Svetlogorsk	21	8	2	11	74	85	−11	26	
11	Ohrana-Dinamo	21	7	1	13	61	75	−14	22	
12	Dinamo-BNTU Minsk	21	7	1	13	57	89	−32	22	
13	Forte	21	5	4	12	69	106	−37	19	
14	Bazar Luninets	21	4	1	16	85	135	−50	13	
15	Neman	21	4	1	16	57	109	−52	13	
16	Rudakovo	21	0	0	21	42	124	−82	0	Relegation

Updated to match(es) played on 01/03/2014. Source: UEFA.com
Rules for classification: 1) points; 2) goal difference; 3) number of goals scored.

== Belgium ==
- Country: Belgium
- Association: Belgian Football Association
- Top-level league: Belgian Futsal Division 1
- UEFA ranking:

Clubs and locations as of the 2013–14 season:

Locations of teams in the 2013–14 Belgian Futsal Division 1

Pos	Team	Pld	W	D	L	GF	GA	GD	Pts	Qualification or relegation
1	Chase Antwerpen	15	14	1	0	102	37	+65	43	2014–15 UEFA Futsal Cup
2	Châtelineau	15	12	1	2	99	53	+46	37	
3	ZVK Proost Lier	15	9	2	4	72	56	+16	29	
4	FP Asse-Gooik	14	9	1	4	64	41	+23	28	
5	Futsal Hasselt	15	8	3	4	50	29	+21	27	
6	Malle Futsal	14	7	1	6	58	52	+6	22	
7	Futsal Beringen	15	5	2	8	42	55	−13	17	
8	Action 21 Charleroi	16	4	4	8	58	70	−12	16	
9	Celtic Houthalen '94	15	4	0	11	61	90	−29	12	
10	Bouraza Médina Bruxelles	15	3	3	9	36	70	−34	12	
11	Baio Futsal Morlanwelz	15	3	2	10	37	80	−43	11	
12	Turcs Herstal	14	0	2	12	36	82	−46	2	Relegation

Updated to match(es) played on 01/03/2014. Source: UEFA.com
Rules for classification: 1) points; 2) goal difference; 3) number of goals scored.

== Bosnia and Herzegovina ==
- Country: Bosnia and Herzegovina
- Association: Football Association of Bosnia and Herzegovina
- Top-level league: Futsal League of Bosnia and Herzegovina
- UEFA ranking:

== Bulgaria ==
- Country: Bulgaria
- Association: Bulgarian Football Union
- Top-level league: Bulgarian Premiere Futsal League
- UEFA ranking:

== Croatia ==
- Country: Croatia
- Association: Croatian Football Federation
- Top-level league: Croatian First Futsal League
- UEFA ranking: 15th

Clubs and locations as of the 2013–14 season:

Locations of teams in 2013–14 Prva HMNL

Pos	Team	Pld	W	D	L	GF	GA	GD	Pts	Qualification or relegation
1	Solin	14	9	2	3	50	31	+19	29	2014–15 UEFA Futsal Cup
2	Nacional Zagreb	14	7	6	1	41	21	+20	27	
3	Murter	14	8	2	4	55	44	+11	26	
4	Alumnus	13	6	4	3	35	25	+10	22	
5	Square	14	6	4	4	48	45	+3	22	
6	Skripta Osijek	13	6	2	5	42	36	+6	20	
7	Vrgorac	14	4	2	8	39	60	−21	14	
8	Novo Vrijeme	13	3	4	6	46	47	−1	13	
9	Kijevo Knin	14	4	1	9	41	63	−22	13	
10	Uspinjača Zagreb	14	3	3	8	40	50	−10	12	
11	Novi Marof	13	2	4	7	39	54	−15	10	Relegation

Updated to match(es) played on 01/03/2014. Source: UEFA.com
Rules for classification: 1) points; 2) goal difference; 3) number of goals scored.

== Cyprus ==
- Country: Cyprus
- Association: Cyprus Football Association
- Top-level league: Cypriot Futsal First Division
- UEFA ranking:

Clubs and locations as of the 2013–14 season:

Locations of teams in 2013–14 Cypriot Futsal First Division

Pos	Team	Pld	W	D	L	GF	GA	GD	Pts	Qualification or relegation
1	APOEL	18	17	0	1	127	44	+83	51	Play-off
2	AC Omonia Nicosia	18	13	1	4	102	54	+48	40	Play-off
3	Parnassos Strovolou	18	13	0	5	98	57	+41	39	Play-off
4	SPE Strovolos Nicosia	18	10	2	6	77	45	+32	32	Play-off
5	Dimitrakis Christodoulou Dherynia	18	9	3	6	82	76	+6	30	Play-out
6	AGBU Ararat Nicosia FC	18	8	0	10	61	68	−7	24	Play-out
7	Melissa FC	18	6	2	10	68	91	−23	20	Play-out
8	AEL Limassol FC	18	6	0	12	67	90	−23	18	Play-out
9	Livadiakos Livadion	18	3	0	15	53	92	−39	9	Relegation
10	Atlas Aglantzia	18	1	0	17	50	168	−118	3	Relegation

- Play-off:

Pos	Team	Pld	W	D	L	GF	GA	GD	Pts	Qualification or relegation
1	APOEL	21	19	0	2	143	53	+90	57	UEFA Futsal Cup
2	Parnassos Strovolou	21	15	0	6	108	68	+40	45	
3	AC Omonia Nicosia	21	14	1	6	112	67	+45	43	
4	SPE Strovolos Nicosia	21	11	2	8	85	56	+29	35	

Updated to match(es) played on 01/03/2014. Source: UEFA.com
Rules for classification: 1) points; 2) goal difference; 3) number of goals scored.

== Czech Republic ==
- Country: Czech Republic
- Association: Football Association of the Czech Republic
- Top-level league: Czech Futsal First League
- UEFA ranking: 5th

Clubs and locations as of the 2013–14 season:

Location of clubs in the 2013–14 Czech league.

Pos	Team	Pld	W	D	L	GF	GA	GD	Pts	Qualification or relegation
1	FK EP Chrudim	19	17	0	2	93	37	+56	51	2014–15 UEFA Futsal Cup
2	Teplice	19	15	2	2	88	42	+46	47	
3	Tango Brno	19	13	2	4	112	56	+56	41	
4	Helas Brno	19	10	1	8	63	51	+12	31	
5	FC Benago	19	9	3	7	85	64	+21	30	
6	SK Kladno	19	9	2	8	48	58	−10	29	
7	SK Slavia Praha	19	9	1	9	73	80	−7	28	
8	AC Sparta Praha	19	7	4	8	72	66	+6	25	
9	1. FC Nejzbach Vysoké Mýto	19	7	1	11	60	78	−18	22	
10	UFA Salamandr Hradec Králové	19	4	2	13	53	89	−36	14	
11	Agromeli Brno	19	3	1	15	52	102	−50	10	
12	SK Indoss Plzeň	19	1	1	17	42	118	−76	4	Relegation

Updated to match(es) played on 05/03/2014. Source: UEFA.com
Rules for classification: 1) points; 2) goal difference; 3) number of goals scored.

== Denmark ==
- Country: Denmark
- Association: Danish Football Association
- Top-level league: Danish Futsal Championship
- UEFA ranking:

== England ==
- Country: England
- Association: The Football Association
- Top-level league: FA National Futsal Series
- UEFA ranking: 30

Clubs and locations as of the 2019–20 season:

Locations of the 2019–20 Futsal League teams

Division 1
Pos	Team	Pld	W	D	L	GF	GA	GD	Pts	Qualification or relegation
1	Birmingham Futsal Club	0	0	0	0	0	0	0	0	Uefa Futsal Cup
2	Bolton Futsal Club	0	0	0	0	0	0	0	0	
3	Kent United Futsal Club	0	0	0	0	0	0	0	0	
4	London Helvecia	0	0	0	0	0	0	0	0	
5	Loughborough Students Futsal Club	0	0	0	0	0	0	0	0	
6	Manchester Futsal Club	0	0	0	0	0	0	0	0	
7	ProFutsal London	0	0	0	0	0	0	0	0	
8	Worcester Futsal Club	0	0	0	0	0	0	0	0	Relegation

update=27/04/2020 |source=THEFA.com

== Estonia ==
- Country: Estonia
- Association: Estonian Football Association
- Top-level league: Saalijalgpalli Meistriliiga
- UEFA ranking:

== Faroe Islands ==
- Country: Faroe Islands
- Association: Faroe Islands Football Association
- Top-level league: None
- UEFA ranking:

== Finland ==
- Country: Finland
- Association: Football Association of Finland
- Top-level league: Futsal-Liiga
- UEFA ranking:

== France ==
- Country: France
- Association: French Football Federation
- Top-level league: Championnat de France de Futsal
- UEFA ranking: 18

Clubs and locations as of the 2014–15 season:

Location of teams in the 2014–15 Division 1

Pos	Team	Pld	W	D	L	GF	GA	GD	Pts	Qualification or relegation
1	Sporting Club de Paris	0	0	0	0	0	0	0	0	2014–15 UEFA Futsal Cup
2	Cannes Bocca Futsal	0	0	0	0	0	0	0	0	
3	Kremlin Bicêtre United	0	0	0	0	0	0	0	0	
4	Bethune Futsal	0	0	0	0	0	0	0	0	
5	Bruguieres SC	0	0	0	0	0	0	0	0	
6	Toulon Tous Ensemble	0	0	0	0	0	0	0	0	
7	Futsal Erdre Atlantique	0	0	0	0	0	0	0	0	
8	Garges ASC	0	0	0	0	0	0	0	0	
9	Bagneux Futsal AS	0	0	0	0	0	0	0	0	
10	Clenay ASL	0	0	0	0	0	0	0	0	
11	Douai Gayant Futsal	0	0	0	0	0	0	0	0	Relegation
12	Echirolles FC Picasso	0	0	0	0	0	0	0	0	Relegation

Updated to match(es) played on 01/03/2014. Source: UEFA.com
Rules for classification: 1) points; 2) goal difference; 3) number of goals scored.

== Georgia ==
- Country: Georgia
- Association: Georgian Football Federation
- Top-level league: Georgian Futsal League
- UEFA ranking:

== Germany ==
- Country: Germany
- Association: German Football Association
- Top-level league: None
- Top-level championship: DFB Futsal Cup
- UEFA ranking:

== Greece ==
- Country: Greece
- Association: Hellenic Football Federation
- Top-level league: Hellenic Futsal Premiere League
- UEFA ranking:

== Hungary ==
- Country: Hungary
- Association: Hungarian Football Federation
- Top-level league: Hungarian National Championship
- UEFA ranking:

Pos	Team	Pld	W	D	L	GF	GA	GD	Pts
1	MVFC Berettyóújfalu	18	16	2	0	88	47	+41	50
2	Haladás VSE	18	15	1	2	87	32	+55	46
3	Nyírgyulaj KSE	18	9	2	7	59	54	+5	29
4	FTC-Fisher Klíma	18	8	2	8	68	64	+4	26
5	Aramis SE	18	8	1	9	58	67	-9	25
6	Dunaferr Due Dutrade FC	18	7	4	7	54	50	+4	25
7	Debreceni Egyetemi AC	18	6	2	10	46	62	-16	20
8	Futsal Club Veszprém	18	4	4	10	43	59	-16	16
9	Rubeola FC	18	3	3	12	36	63	-27	11
10	SG Kecskemét Futsal	18	3	1	14	30	71	-41	

As of the 2019–20 season.

== Iceland ==
- Country: Iceland
- Association: Football Association of Iceland
- Top-level league: Icelandic Futsal First Division
- UEFA ranking:

== Israel ==
- Country: Israel
- Association: Israel Football Association
- Top-level league: Israeli Futsal League
- UEFA ranking:

== Italy ==
- Country: Italy
- Association: Federazione Italiana Giuoco Calcio
- Top-level league: Serie A (futsal)
- UEFA ranking: 7th

Clubs and locations as of the 2013–14 season:

Locations of the 2013–14 Serie A teams

Pos	Team	Pld	W	D	L	GF	GA	GD	Pts	Qualification or relegation
1	Asti	13	7	6	0	65	32	+33	27	Play-off
2	Kaos Futsal	13	5	5	3	56	32	+24	20	Play-off
3	Acqua e Sapone	12	4	6	2	51	40	+11	18	Play-off
4	Lazio	13	4	6	3	46	47	−1	18	Play-off
5	Luparense	12	4	5	3	44	30	+14	17	Play-off
6	Napoli	13	5	2	6	52	49	+3	17	Play-off
7	Marca Futsal	13	4	3	6	33	87	−54	15	Play-off
8	Rieti	12	4	2	6	35	45	−10	14	Play-off
9	Pescara	12	3	3	6	38	44	−6	12	Play-out
10	LCF Martina	13	3	2	8	44	58	−14	11	Play-out

Updated to match(es) played on 01/03/2014. Source: UEFA.com
Rules for classification: 1) points; 2) goal difference; 3) number of goals scored.

== Kazakhstan ==
- Country: Kazakhstan
- Association: Football Union of Kazakhstan
- Top-level league: Kazakhstani Futsal Championship
- UEFA ranking:

Clubs and locations as of the 2013–14 season:

Location of teams in the 2013–14 Kazakhstani Futsal Championship

Pos	Team	Pld	W	D	L	GF	GA	GD	Pts	Qualification or relegation
1	Kairat Almaty	28	26	1	1	244	71	+173	79	2014–15 UEFA Futsal Cup
2	Tulpar Karagandy	28	23	3	2	202	59	+143	72	
3	SKA-Yug	28	16	3	9	147	134	+13	51	
4	Ayat	28	13	2	13	164	135	+29	41	
5	Ozen Munai	28	12	3	13	122	111	+11	39	
6	Ushkyn-Iskra Astana	28	8	2	18	88	162	−74	26	
7	CSKA	28	5	0	23	86	186	−100	15	
8	Akzhayik	28	2	0	26	63	258	−195	6	Relegation

Updated to match(es) played on 16/03/2014. Source: UEFA.com
Rules for classification: 1) points; 2) goal difference; 3) number of goals scored.

== Latvia ==
- Country: Latvia
- Association: Latvian Football Federation
- Top-level league: Latvian Futsal Premier League
- UEFA ranking:

== Liechtenstein ==
- Country: Liechtenstein
- Association: Liechtenstein Football Association
- Top-level league: None
- UEFA ranking:

== Lithuania ==
- Country: Lithuania
- Association: Lithuanian Football Federation
- Top-level league: Lithuanian Futsal Championship
- UEFA ranking:

== Luxembourg ==
- Country: Luxembourg
- Association: Luxembourg Football Federation
- Top-level league: None
- UEFA ranking:

== Malta ==
- Country: Malta
- Association: Malta Football Association
- Top-level league: Maltese Futsal League
- UEFA ranking:

== Moldova ==
- Country: Moldova
- Association: Football Association of Moldova
- Top-level league: Moldovan Futsal National Division
- UEFA ranking:

== Montenegro ==
- Country: Montenegro
- Association: Football Association of Montenegro
- Top-level league: Montenegrin Futsal First League
- UEFA ranking:

== Netherlands ==
- Country: Netherlands
- Association: Royal Dutch Football Association
- Top-level league: Topdivisie
- UEFA ranking:

Clubs and locations as of the 2013–14 season:

Location of teams in the Dutch Futsal League

Pos	Team	Pld	W	D	L	GF	GA	GD	Pts	Qualification or relegation
1	FC Marlène	17	13	3	1	80	46	+34	42	2014–15 UEFA Futsal Cup
2	CF Eindhoven	18	12	3	3	116	68	+48	39	
3	FCK De Hommel	17	11	3	3	81	40	+41	36	
4	Hovocubo	17	11	2	4	83	37	+46	35	
5	JCK / AISO	17	9	0	8	82	74	+8	27	
6	Groene Ster Vlissingen	17	9	0	8	80	86	−6	27	
7	Veerhuys/Desko	17	7	0	10	59	65	−6	21	
8	AORC	17	6	2	9	54	60	−6	20	
9	TPP Rotterdam	18	6	2	10	55	69	−14	20	
10	LZV/Kuypers	17	4	4	9	65	80	−15	16	
11	Leekster Eagles	17	2	1	14	52	89	−37	7	
12	TZR Fermonia Boys	17	2	2	13	40	133	−93	7 (Note: TZR Fermonia Boys have had 1 point(s) deducted)	Relegation

Updated to match(es) played on 09/03/2014. Source: UEFA.com
Rules for classification: 1) points; 2) goal difference; 3) number of goals scored.

== Northern Ireland ==
- Country: Northern Ireland
- Association: Irish Football Association
- Top-level league: None
- UEFA ranking:

== Norway ==
- Country: Norway
- Association: Football Association of Norway (NFF)
- Top-level league: NFF Futsal Eliteserie
- UEFA ranking:

Clubs and locations as of the 2013–14 season:

Locations of the teams in the 2013/14 Norwegian Futsal Premier League

Pos	Team	Pld	W	D	L	GF	GA	GD	Pts	Qualification or relegation
1	Vegakameratene	18	15	3	0	74	18	+56	48	2014–15 UEFA Futsal Cup
2	Grorud	18	10	4	4	86	60	+26	34	
3	Nidaros Futsal	18	11	0	7	65	41	+24	33	
4	Kongsvinger Futsal	18	10	1	7	71	61	+10	31	
5	Sjarmtrollan IL	18	9	2	7	70	63	+7	29	
6	Tiller	18	8	2	8	62	58	+4	26	
7	Sandefjord Fotball	18	8	1	9	61	51	+10	25	
8	KFUM Futsal Oslo	18	6	3	9	63	66	−3	21	
9	Solør	18	3	1	14	33	97	−64	10	
10	Horten	18	1	1	16	49	119	−70	4	Relegation

Updated to match(es) played on 17/03/2014. Source: UEFA.com
Rules for classification: 1) points; 2) goal difference; 3) number of goals scored.

== Poland ==
- Country: Poland
- Association: Polish Football Association
- Top-level league: Ekstraklasa (futsal)
- UEFA ranking:

Clubs and locations as of the 2013–14 season:

Location of teams in the 2013–14 Ekstraklasa

Pos	Team	Pld	W	D	L	GF	GA	GD	Pts	Qualification or relegation
1	Rekord Bielsko-Biała	17	14	0	3	67	32	+35	42	2014–15 UEFA Futsal Cup
2	Pogoń 04 Szczecin	16	12	1	3	58	40	+18	37	
3	Gatta Zdunska Wola	17	12	0	5	58	43	+15	36	
4	Wisła Krakbet Kraków	17	10	3	4	88	49	+39	33	
5	Clearex Chorzów	16	7	3	6	52	53	−1	24	
6	GAF Jasna Gliwice	17	7	2	8	58	62	−4	23	
7	AZS Uniwersytet Gdanski	17	6	4	7	44	48	−4	22	
8	Red Devils Chojnice	17	5	5	7	52	58	−6	20	
9	Euromaster Chrobry Głogów	17	5	5	7	49	52	−3	20	
10	AZS Uniwersytet Śląski Katowice	17	2	3	12	37	80	−43	9	
11	Remedium Pyskowice	17	4	4	9	39	53	−14	16	
12	GKS Tychy	17	2	0	15	51	83	−32	6	Relegation

Updated to match(es) played on 01/03/2014. Source: UEFA.com
Rules for classification: 1) points; 2) goal difference; 3) number of goals scored.

== Portugal ==
- Country: Portugal
- Association: Portuguese Football Federation
- Top-level league: Liga Portuguesa de Futsal
- UEFA ranking: 3rd

Clubs and locations as of the 2013–14 season:

Location of teams in the 2013–14 Liga Portuguesa

Pos	Team	Pld	W	D	L	GF	GA	GD	Pts	Qualification or relegation
1	Sporting CP	20	17	2	1	114	39	+75	53	Play-off
2	SL Benfica	20	16	2	2	86	47	+39	50	Play-off
3	Braga/AAUM	20	16	0	4	101	58	+43	48	Play-off
4	Leões de Porto Salvo	20	14	2	4	114	76	+38	44	Play-off
5	Boavista FC	20	9	2	9	59	77	−18	29	Play-off
6	Fundão	20	8	4	8	58	52	+6	28	Play-off
7	CF Os Belenenses	20	8	3	9	62	78	−16	27	Play-off
8	Rio Ave FC	20	6	6	8	52	57	−5	24	Play-off
9	Modicus	20	5	4	11	54	69	−15	19	
10	Dramático Cascais	20	5	4	11	59	81	−22	19	
11	Póvoa Futsal Clube	20	5	3	12	48	58	−10	18	
12	Vitória dos Olivais	20	3	6	11	52	72	−20	15	
13	Académica de Coimbra	20	4	3	13	46	88	−42	15	
14	Vila Verde	20	2	3	15	51	104	−53	9	Relegation

Updated to match(es) played on 01/03/2014. Source: UEFA.com
Rules for classification: 1) points; 2) goal difference; 3) number of goals scored.

== Republic of Ireland ==
- Country: Republic of Ireland
- Association: Football Association of Ireland
- Top-level league: Emerald Futsal League
- UEFA ranking:

2014–15 Emerald Futsal League

As of 2016:

Team	Home city/suburb	Court
Academic Futsal	Dublin	
B&H United Futsal	Dublin	
Blue Magic Futsal	Clondalkin	Collinstown Park Community College
Crumlin United Futsal	Crumlin, Dublin	
Puskas & Hagi Futsal	Dublin	
St Ita's Futsal	Donabate/Portrane	Donabate and Portrane Community and Leisure Centre
Saints & Scholars Futsal	Whitechurch, County Dublin	St Columba's College
Transylvania Futsal	Blanchardstown	IT Blanchardstown

== Republic of Macedonia ==
- Country: Republic of Macedonia
- Association: Football Federation of Macedonia
- Top-level league: Macedonian Futsal First League
- UEFA ranking:

Clubs and locations as of the 2013–14 season:

Locations of teams participating in the 2013–14 season

Pos	Team	Pld	W	D	L	GF	GA	GD	Pts	Qualification or relegation
1	Zelezarec Skopje	19	17	2	0	87	34	+53	53	2014–15 UEFA Futsal Cup
2	Skopje 2011	19	13	1	5	89	54	+35	40	
3	SEE Univerzitet Tetovo	19	12	3	4	90	55	+35	39	
4	Bigo Kumanovo	19	8	5	6	76	58	+18	29	
5	Royal Iliret Kumanovo	19	7	1	11	79	86	−7	22	
6	Crna Reka Kavadarci	19	5	5	9	94	109	−15	20	
7	Juventus Serava	19	6	4	9	53	75	−22	19 (Note: Juventus Serava have had 3 points deducted)	
8	Veles	19	5	3	11	49	66	−17	18	
9	Skendija Tetovo	19	5	1	13	70	123	−53	16	
10	M. Ajax	19	4	1	14	84	111	−27	13	Relegation

Updated to match(es) played on 09/03/2014. Source: UEFA.com
Rules for classification: 1) points; 2) goal difference; 3) number of goals scored.

== Romania ==
- Country: Romania
- Association: Romanian Football Federation
- Top-level league: Liga I (futsal)
- UEFA ranking:

Clubs and locations as of the 2013–14 season:

Location of teams in the 2013–14 Liga I

Pos	Team	Pld	W	D	L	GF	GA	GD	Pts	Qualification or relegation
1	Deva	16	15	1	0	121	37	+84	46	2014–15 UEFA Futsal Cup
2	Târgu Mureş	16	15	1	0	121	49	+72	46	
3	Odorheiu Secuiesc	16	13	1	2	128	44	+84	40	
4	United Galati	16	9	0	7	72	67	+5	27	
5	Sfintul Gheorghe	15	7	3	5	60	49	+11	24	
6	Dunărea Călărași	15	4	2	9	50	66	−16	14	
7	Studentesc Iasi	15	4	0	11	58	76	−18	12	
8	Târgu Secuiesc	16	4	0	12	37	105	−68	12	
9	Sportis Targoviste	15	3	2	10	52	95	−43	11	
10	CSM Focsani	15	3	1	11	40	88	−48	10	
11	Clujana Cluj Napoca	15	2	1	12	46	109	−63	7	Relegation

Updated to match(es) played on 09/03/2014. Source: UEFA.com
Rules for classification: 1) points; 2) goal difference; 3) number of goals scored.

== Russia ==
- Country: Russia
- Association: Football Union of Russia
- Top-level league: Russian Futsal Super League
- UEFA ranking: 4th

Clubs and locations as of the 2013–14 season:

Locations of teams in the 2013–14 Russian Super League

Pos	Team	Pld	W	D	L	GF	GA	GD	Pts	Qualification or relegation
1	Dynamo Moscow	27	19	7	1	127	77	+50	64	2014–15 UEFA Futsal Cup
2	Ugra Yugorsk	27	19	4	4	129	91	+38	61	
3	MFK Tyumen	27	18	3	6	115	67	+48	57	
4	Dina Moscow	27	17	5	5	126	83	+43	56	
5	Sinara Ekaterinburg	27	15	8	4	119	80	+39	53	
6	Sibiryak	27	14	1	12	113	108	+5	43	
7	Norilsky Nickel	27	11	6	10	110	99	+11	39	
8	MFK KPRF	27	6	5	16	67	96	−29	23	
9	Mytischi	27	6	4	17	90	111	−21	22	
10	Novaja Generacija	27	6	4	17	91	119	−28	22	
11	Politech St. Petersburg	27	5	2	20	93	137	−44	17	
12	MFK Progress	27	1	1	25	80	192	−112	4	Relegation

Updated to match(es) played on 01/03/2014. Source: UEFA.com
Rules for classification: 1) points; 2) goal difference; 3) number of goals scored.

== San Marino ==
- Country: San Marino
- Association: San Marino Football Federation
- League: Sammarinese Futsal Championship
- UEFA ranking:

== Scotland ==
- Country: Scotland
- Association: Scottish Football Association
- Top-level league: Scottish Futsal League
- UEFA ranking:

== Serbia ==
- Country: Serbia
- Association: Football Association of Serbia
- Top-level league: Serbian Prva Futsal Liga
- UEFA ranking: 7th

Clubs and locations as of the 2013–14 season:

Location of teams in the 2013–14 Serbian Prva Futsal Liga

Pos	Team	Pld	W	D	L	GF	GA	GD	Pts	Qualification or relegation
1	Ekonomac Kragujevac	13	12	1	0	86	13	+73	37	2014–15 UEFA Futsal Cup
2	Smederevo	13	6	5	2	41	31	+10	23	
3	Kopernikus Vidre Niš	13	5	6	2	55	43	+12	21	
4	Marbo Beograd	13	6	3	4	45	45	0	21	
5	Novi Pazar	13	6	3	4	36	43	−7	21	
6	Becej	13	6	1	6	43	48	−5	19	
7	Kalca	13	5	0	8	39	51	−12	15	
8	Vranje	13	3	3	7	43	47	−4	12	
9	VIK Naissus	13	3	2	8	35	49	−14	11	
10	Kolubara Lazarevac	13	1	0	12	27	80	−53	3	Relegation

Updated to match(es) played on 01/03/2014. Source: UEFA.com
Rules for classification: 1) points; 2) goal difference; 3) number of goals scored.

== Slovakia ==
- Country: Slovakia
- Association: Slovak Football Association
- Top-level league: Slovak Futsal Extraliga
- UEFA ranking: 14th

Clubs and locations as of the 2013–14 season:

Location of teams in the 2013–14 Slovak Futsal Extraliga

Pos	Team	Pld	W	D	L	GF	GA	GD	Pts	Qualification or relegation
1	Slov-Matic Bratislava	18	17	1	0	166	36	+130	52	2014–15 UEFA Futsal Cup
2	Pinerola Bratislava	18	12	3	3	86	40	+46	39	
3	Nové Zámky	18	8	3	7	72	82	−10	27	
4	FTVŠ UK Bratislava	18	8	2	8	56	77	−21	26	
5	Futsal Team Levice	18	8	1	9	71	77	−6	25	
6	FK Prešov	18	7	2	9	80	86	−6	23	
7	Makroteam Žilina	18	6	2	10	75	92	−17	20	
8	sTC Púchov	18	6	2	10	66	89	−23	20	
9	MFSK Nitra	18	6	2	10	64	97	−33	20	
10	Cekan Mekenroff 1897	18	2	2	14	47	107	−60	8	Relegation

Updated to match(es) played on 09/03/2014. Source: UEFA.com
Rules for classification: 1) points; 2) goal difference; 3) number of goals scored.

== Slovenia ==
- Country: Slovenia
- Association: Football Association of Slovenia
- Top-level league: Slovenian Futsal League

As of the 2024–25 season

Team locations in the 2024–25 season

Team	Location
Benedikt	Benedikt
Bronx Škofije	Škofije
Dobovec	Rogatec
Dobrepolje	Videm
Extrem	Ribnica
KIX Ajdovščina	Ajdovščina
Mlinše	Mlinše
Oplast Kobarid	Kobarid
Sevnica	Sevnica
Siliko	Vrhnika
Trzin	Trzin

== Spain ==
- Country: Spain
- Association: Royal Spanish Football Federation
- Top-level league: Primera División de Futsal
- UEFA ranking: 1st

Clubs and locations as of the 2013–14 season:

Location of teams in the 2013–14 Primera División de Futsal

Pos	Team	Pld	W	D	L	GF	GA	GD	Pts	Qualification or relegation
1	Inter Movistar	21	19	1	1	113	44	+69	58	Play-off
2	ElPozo Murcia	22	17	2	3	103	52	+51	53	Play-off
3	FC Barcelona	22	15	5	2	84	37	+47	50	Play-off
4	Marfil Santa Coloma	21	12	3	6	95	77	+18	39	Play-off
5	Navarra	21	11	1	9	80	79	+1	34	Play-off
6	Santiago	21	9	5	7	62	51	+11	32	Play-off
7	Burela	22	8	6	8	61	62	−1	30	Play-off
8	Ribera Navarra	21	8	6	7	54	59	−5	30	Play-off
9	Jumilla	21	7	5	9	65	72	−7	26	
10	Lugo	22	6	4	12	64	84	−20	22	
11	Jaén	21	5	4	12	46	70	−24	19	
12	Manacor	22	5	4	13	60	91	−31	19	
13	Peñiscola	22	3	9	10	41	72	−31	18	
14	Zaragoza	22	4	4	14	56	84	−28	16	
15	Gran Canaria	21	2	1	18	45	95	−50	7	Relegation

Updated to match(es) played on 01/03/2014. Source: UEFA.com
Rules for classification: 1) points; 2) goal difference; 3) number of goals scored.

== Sweden ==
- Country: Sweden
- Association: Swedish Football Association
- Top-level league: Swedish Futsal Championship
- UEFA ranking:

== Switzerland ==
- Country: Switzerland
- Association: Swiss Football Association
- Top-level league: Swiss Futsal Championship
- UEFA ranking:

Pos	Team	Pld	W	D	L	GF	GA	GD	Pts	Qualification or relegation
1	Uni Futsal Team Bulle	14	12	1	1	88	40	+48	37	2014–15 UEFA Futsal Cup
2	Futsal Minerva	14	8	3	3	70	45	+25	27	
3	FT Fribourg Old Fox	14	9	0	5	73	41	+32	27	
4	Mobulu Futsal UNI Bern	14	6	1	7	59	67	−8	19	
5	Futsal Löwen Zürich	14	6	0	8	63	66	−3	18	
6	FC Wettingen 93	14	5	0	9	53	92	−39	15	
7	MNK Croatia 97	14	3	2	9	61	92	−31	11	
8	FC Geneva	14	2	3	9	69	93	−24	6 (Note: Geneva have had 3 point(s) deducted)	Relegation

Updated to match(es) played on 01/03/2014. Source: UEFA.com
Rules for classification: 1) points; 2) goal difference; 3) number of goals scored.
Notes:

Play-off

Semifinals
4	Mobulu	2	3
1	Bulle	1	6
3	Fribourg	3	4
2	Minerva	8	5

Final
2	Minerva	4
1	Bulle	6

== Turkey ==
- Country: Turkey
- Association: Turkish Football Federation
- Top-level league: Turkish Futsal League
- UEFA ranking:

== Ukraine ==
- Country: Ukraine
- Association: Football Federation of Ukraine
- Top-level league: Extra-Liga
- UEFA ranking: 6th
Locations of team home grounds in the 2013–14 Ukrainian League

Clubs and locations as of the 2013–14 season:

Pos	Team	Pld	W	D	L	GF	GA	GD	Pts	Qualification or relegation
1	Enakievez Enakievo	16	12	2	2	48	29	+19	38	2014–15 UEFA Futsal Cup
2	Lokomotiv Kharkov	15	7	5	3	34	27	+7	26	
3	Uragan Ivano-Frankovsk	16	7	5	4	43	38	+5	26	
4	Energy Lviv	16	7	4	5	46	31	+15	25	
5	Kardinal Lviv	15	4	4	7	31	35	−4	16	
6	Lug.T.K. Lugansk	15	4	1	10	36	46	−10	13	
7	Sportleader	15	2	1	12	29	61	−32	7	

Updated to match(es) played on 01/03/2014. Source: UEFA.com
Rules for classification: 1) points; 2) goal difference; 3) number of goals scored.

== Wales ==
- Country: Wales
- Association: Football Association of Wales
- Top-level league: None
- Top-level championship: Welsh Futsal Cup

== See also ==
- List of top-division futsal clubs in AFC countries
- List of top-division futsal clubs in CONMEBOL countries
