= 2008–09 Norwegian Futsal Premier League =

Norwegian futsal league season

The 2008–09 Norwegian Futsal Premier League season (known as Telekiosken Futsal Liga for sponsorship reasons) is the first ever season for futsal in Norway. It began 29 November 2008 and ended 15 February 2009.

== League table ==
P	Team	Pld	W	D	L	GF	GA	GD	Pts	Qualification or relegation
1	Nidaros	18	15	0	3	127	63	+64	45	UEFA Futsal Cup 2009–10
2	KFUM Oslo	18	13	1	4	86	49	+37	40
3	Holmlia	18	12	1	5	99	81	+18	37
4	Vegakameratene	18	11	1	6	96	66	+30	34
5	Sandefjord	18	9	0	9	79	76	+3	27
6	Solør	18	7	1	10	68	77	−9	22
7	Horten	18	6	2	10	74	102	−28	20
8	Fyllingsdalen	18	5	1	12	61	105	−44	16
9	Harstad	18	3	3	12	66	101	−35	12	Relegation to First Division
10	Bogstadveien	18	4	0	14	63	99	−36	12	Relegation to First Division

Source: speaker.no
Rules for classification: 1st points; 2nd goal difference; 3rd goals scored.
P = Position; Pld = Matches played; W = Matches won; D = Matches drawn; L = Matches lost; GF = Goals for; GA = Goals against; GD = Goal difference; Pts = Points; (C) = Champion; (R) = Relegated.

== See also ==
- 2008 in Norwegian football
- 2009 in Norwegian football
- 2008–09 Norwegian Futsal First Division
