= 2009–10 Norwegian Futsal Premier League =

Norwegian futsal league season

The 2009–10 Norwegian Futsal Premier League season (known as Telekiosken Futsal Liga for sponsorship reasons) is the second season for futsal in Norway. It began 21 November 2009 and ended 7 March 2010.

== League table ==
P	Team	Pld	W	D	L	GF	GA	GD	Pts	Qualification or relegation
1	KFUM Oslo	18	13	4	1	94	40	+54	43	UEFA Futsal Cup 2010–11
2	Vegakameratene	18	14	0	4	69	48	+21	42
3	Nidaros	18	9	5	4	93	69	+24	32
4	Fyllingsdalen	18	8	4	6	80	69	+11	28
5	Solør	18	6	6	6	70	65	+5	24
6	Sandefjord	18	7	3	8	63	74	−11	24
7	Holmlia	18	5	7	6	49	57	−8	22
8	Horten	18	5	3	10	67	87	−20	18
9	Nordpolen	18	5	2	11	52	72	−20	17	Relegation to First Division
10	Lillehammer	18	1	0	17	54	110	−56	3	Relegation to First Division

Source: speaker.no
Rules for classification: 1st points; 2nd goal difference; 3rd goals scored.
P = Position; Pld = Matches played; W = Matches won; D = Matches drawn; L = Matches lost; GF = Goals for; GA = Goals against; GD = Goal difference; Pts = Points; (C) = Champion; (R) = Relegated.

== See also ==
- 2009 in Norwegian football
- 2010 in Norwegian football
- 2009–10 Norwegian Futsal First Division
