= Futsal in Brazil =

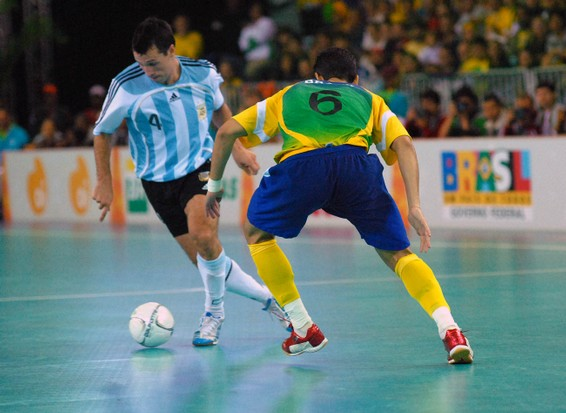
Brazil against Argentina at the 2007 Pan American Games final

Futsal in Brazil is governed by the Brazilian Futsal Confederation. Although it is not the most popular spectator sport in the country, it is the most practiced.

== History ==
Futsal was developed in Brazil and Uruguay around the same time, in 1934 in Uruguay and in the 1940s in Brazil. In Brazil the sport was developed by YMCA of São Paulo due to the lack of available football fields. Basketball courts and hockey posts were used to practice the sport.

In the 1950s, the first state futsal federations were founded, starting with the Federação Metropolitana de Futebol de Salão (Metropolitan Futsal Federation), of Rio de Janeiro state, founded on July 28, 1954, and currently known as Federação de Futebol de Salão do Estado do Rio de Janeiro (Rio de Janeiro State Futsal Federation), followed by the state federations of Minas Gerais, also founded in 1954, São Paulo, in 1955, Ceará, Paraná, Rio Grande do Sul and Bahia in 1956, and several others in the subsequent years.

On June 15, 1979, the Brazilian Futsal Confederation was founded, in Rio de Janeiro, after the Brazilian Sports Confederation (CBD), which was the responsible for the administration of several sports, folded. The founding states were Acre, Alagoas, Amapá, Amazonas, Bahia, Ceará, Distrito Federal, Espírito Santo, Goiás, Paraíba, Paraná, Pernambuco, Maranhão, Mato Grosso, Minas Gerais, Rio de Janeiro, Rio Grande do Norte, Rio Grande do Sul, Santa Catarina, São Paulo, and Sergipe. On August 27 of that year, Aécio de Borba Vasconcelos was elected as the organization's first president, and Fortaleza was chosen as its headquarters.

Futsal is played by most children in Brazil at some point. It combines the fast play and individual talent that is typical of Brazilian football. Many professional football players from Brazil started playing futsal. Perhaps the most notable of these were Falcão and Ronaldinho.

== National team ==
The Brazil national team is very successful, winning several titles, such as the FIFA Futsal World Cup, the South American Futsal Championship, the Grand Prix de Futsal, and the Futsal Mundialito. Brazil also won the first edition of the sport at the Pan American Games, in 2007.

The team was on a 167-game winning streak and was recently ended by Spain at the Grand Prix.

== Domestic competitions ==
There are two national competitions, which are the Liga Futsal, and the Taça Brasil de Futsal. Liga Futsal started in 1996, while Taça Brasil de Futsal is the oldest national futsal competition in Brazil, and started in 1968. Also, each state federation organizes its own state championship.

== See also ==
- List of futsal clubs in Brazil
