= List of top-division futsal clubs in CONMEBOL countries =

CONMEBOL countries on this map of the world's six football confederations

The South American Football Confederation (CONMEBOL) is the administrative and controlling body for South American futsal. It consists of 10 member associations, each of which is responsible for governing futsal in their respective countries.

All widely recognize sovereign states located entirely within Europe are members, with the exceptions of Guyana, Suriname and French Guiana.

Each CONMEBOL member has its own futsal league system. Clubs playing in each top-level league compete for the title as the country's club champions. Clubs also compete in the league or national cup competitions for places in the following season's CONMEBOL club competitions, the Copa Libertadores de Futsal.

== Argentina ==
- Football association: Argentine Football Association
- Top-level league: Primera División de Futsal

Clubs and locations as of the 2024 season:

Team	Location
17 de Agosto	(Buenos Aires) Villa Pueyrredón
América del Sud	(Buenos Aires) Parque Avellaneda
Atlanta	(Buenos Aires) Villa Crespo
Barracas Central	(Buenos Aires) Barracas
Boca Juniors	(Buenos Aires) La Boca
Camioneros	(Buenos Aires) Villa Real
Ferro Carril Oeste	(Buenos Aires) Caballito
Gimnasia y Esgrima LP	(Buenos Aires Province) La Plata
Glorias	(Buenos Aires Province) Tigre
Hebraica	(Buenos Aires Province) Pilar
Independiente	(Buenos Aires Province) Avellaneda
Jorge Newbery	(Buenos Aires) Villa Real
Kimberley	(Buenos Aires) Villa Devoto
Nueva Chicago	(Buenos Aires) Mataderos
Pinocho	(Buenos Aires) Villa Urquiza
Racing	(Buenos Aires Province) Avellaneda
SECLA	(Buenos Aires Province) Avellaneda
San Lorenzo	(Buenos Aires) Boedo

== Bolivia ==
- Football association: Bolivian Football Federation
- Top-level league: Liga Nacional de Futsal

Clubs and locations as of the 2023 season:

Team	Location
Adutoys	La Paz
Agua Santa	(Oruro Department) Oruro
Antofagasta	(Chuquisaca Department) Sucre
Concepción	(Potosí Department) Potosí
Cooperativa Rural Eléctrica	Santa Cruz de la Sierra
Fantasmas Morales Morralitos	(Oruro Department) Oruro
Lizondo	(Chuquisaca Department) Sucre
Morales Morralitos	(Oruro Department) Oruro
Nantes Vicky Ríos	(Tarija Department) Tarija
Petrolero	(Tarija Department) Yacuiba
La Prensa	(Tarija Department) Yacuiba
Proyecto Latín Cross	La Paz
San Martín de Porres	(Tarija Department) Tarija
Universitario	(Chuquisaca Department) Sucre
Víctor Muriel	(Cochabamba Department) Cochabamba
Wolf Sport	La Paz

== Brazil ==
- Football association: Brazilian Football Confederation
- Top-level league: Campeonato Brasileiro de Futsal

Clubs and locations as of the 2024 season:

Team	Location
ADS Sapezal	(Mato Grosso) Sapezal
América-MG	(Minas Gerais) Belo Horizonte
América-RN	(Rio Grande do Norte) Natal
Apodi Futsal	(Rio Grande do Norte) Apodi
Ceará	(Ceará) Fortaleza
CRB	(Alagoas) Maceió
Concórdia Futsal	(Santa Catarina (state)) Concórdia
Cruzeiro	(Minas Gerais) Belo Horizonte
Estrela do Norte	(Amazonas (Brazilian state)) Manaus
Sampaio Corrêa	(Maranhão) São Luís
ACEL Chopinzinho	(Paraná (state)) Chopinzinho
ASF Sorriso	(Mato Grosso) Sorriso
Vasco da Gama	(Rio de Janeiro (state)) Rio de Janeiro
Sergipe	(Sergipe) Aracaju
Náutico	(Pernambuco) Recife
Costa Rica	(Mato Grosso do Sul) Costa Rica
Fortaleza	(Ceará) Fortaleza
Passo Fundo Futsal	(Rio Grande do Sul) Passo Fundo
Sport	(Pernambuco) Recife
Yeesco Futsal	(Rio Grande do Sul) Carazinho

== Chile ==
- Football association: Football Federation of Chile
- Top-level league: Campeonato Nacional de Fútbol Sala

== Colombia ==
- Football association: Colombian Football Federation
- Top-level league: Liga Colombiana de Futsal

Clubs and locations as of the 2024 season:

Team	Location
Academia Central Cajicá	(Cundinamarca Department) Cajicá
Alpha FC	(Risaralda Department) Dosquebradas
Atlético Cauca	(Cauca Department) Popayán
Atlético Dorada Futsal	(Caldas Department) La Dorada
Buenaventura Futsal	(Valle del Cauca Department) Buenaventura
Club Atlético Santander	(Santander, Spain) Floridablanca
Club Baby Soccer	(Tolima Department) Ibagué
Club D`Martin FC	(Cundinamarca Department) Madrid
Club Sabaneros FC	(Sucre, Venezuela) Sincelejo
Corporación Real Antioquia	(Antioquia Department) Bello
Cúcuta Futsal FC	(Norte de Santander Department) Cúcuta
Deportivo Meta H & H	(Meta Department) Villavicencio
Deportivo Sanpas	(Boyacá Department) Tunja
El Carmen de Viboral	(Antioquia Department) Medellín
Fundación Inter de Cartagena	(Bolívar (state)) Cartagena
Futsal Rionegro	(Antioquia Department) Rionegro
Generaciones de Bolívar 90	(Bolívar (state)) Santa Rosa del Sur
Gremio Samario	(Magdalena Department) Santa Marta
Icsin FC	(Valle del Cauca Department) Yumbo
Independiente Barranquilla	(Atlántico Department) Barranquilla
Leones de Nariño	(Nariño Department) Pasto
Llaneros FC	(Meta Department) Villavicencio
Lyon de Cali	(Valle del Cauca Department) Cali
Real Bucaramanga	(Santander, Spain) Floridablanca
Saeta	(Cundinamarca Department) Bogotá
Santa Marta Beach Soccer	(Magdalena Department) Santa Marta
Sport Team Club	(Cundinamarca Department) Bogotá
Tigres del Quindío	(Quindío Department) Armenia
Utrahuilca	(Huila Department) Neiva
Universidad de Manizales	(Caldas Department) Manizales
Universidad Sergio Arboleda	(Cundinamarca Department) Bogotá
Leones FC	(Antioquia Department) Itagüí

== Ecuador ==
- Football association: Ecuadorian Football Federation
- Top-level league: Liga Nacional de Futsal Serie A

== Paraguay ==
- Football association: Paraguayan Football Association
- Top-level league: Liga Premium de Futsal

Clubs and locations as of the 2024 season:

Team	Location
AFEMEC	Asunción
Campo Alto	Asunción
Cerro Porteño	Asunción
Exa Ysaty	Asunción
Deportivo Humaitá	Asunción
Olimpia	Asunción
Presidente Hayes	Asunción
San Cristóbal	Asunción
Sport Colonial	Asunción
Star's Club	Asunción
Villa Hayes	(Presidente Hayes Department) Villa Hayes

== Peru ==
- Football association: Peruvian Football Federation
- Top-level league: Liga Futsal Pro

Clubs and locations as of the 2024 season:

Team	Location
ADEBAMI	Lima
AFA Rimac Rebaza	Lima
Cabitos Futsal	Lima
Hermanos Rey	Lima
Palermo FC	Lima
Panta Walon	Callao
Primero de Mayo	Lima
Santa María	Lima
Señor de los Milagros	Lima
Universitario de Deportes	Lima

== Uruguay ==
- Football association: Uruguayan Football Association
- Top-level league: Campeonato Uruguayo de Fútbol Sala

== Venezuela ==
- Football association: Venezuelan Football Federation
- Top-level league: Liga FUTVE Futsal 1

== See also ==
- List of top-division futsal clubs in AFC countries
- List of top-division futsal clubs in UEFA countries
