= Madriu =

Madriu may refer to:

- Madriu-Perafita-Claror Valley (a.k.a. Valley of Madriu or "Madriu"), a glacial valley, and UNESCO World Heritage Site, in Andorra
- Madriu (river) (or "Madriu"), a river in Andorra that flows into Lake Engolasters
- HD 131496 b (planet), Star Arcalis, Constellation Bootes; an exoplanet named after the glacial valley in Andorra
- FC Madriu (futsal), a futsal team in Andorra; see List of top-division futsal clubs in UEFA countries
