= FK Cup =

- Organiser(s): Korea Futsal League
- Founded: 2010
- Region: South Korea
- Current champions: Gyeonggi LBFS (2025)
- Most championships: Nowon FS (5 titles)
- Website: www.futsal.or.kr

The FK Cup (Korean: FK컵) is a cup competition for futsal clubs in South Korea. Its first edition started in 2010.

== Results ==
=== Finals ===
| Year | Champions | Score | Runners-up | Ref. |
|---|---|---|---|---|
| 2010 | FS Seoul | Round-robin | Jeonju MAG | |
| 2011 | FS Seoul | 9–3 | Yongin FS | |
| 2012 | FS Seoul | Unknown | Jeonju MAG | |
| 2013 | Jeonju MAG | 4–2 | Fantasia Bucheon | |
| 2014 | Jeonju MAG | 8–1 | Dream Hub Gunsan | |
| 2015 | Chungbuk Jecheon | 6–4 | Jeonju MAG | |
| 2016 | Fantasia Bucheon | 3–2 | FS Seoul | |
| 2017 | Jeonju MAG | 5–3 | Star FS Seoul | |
| 2018 | Jeonju MAG | 2–1 | Yes Gumi | |
| 2019 | Star FS Seoul | 8–2 | Goyang Bulls | |
| 2020 | Fantasia Bucheon | 8–4 | Star FS Seoul | |
| 2021 | Fantasia Bucheon | 3–3 (a.e.t.) (4–2 p) | Nowon FS | |
| 2022 | Nowon FS | 3–3 (a.e.t.) (4–2 p) | Gyeonggi LBFS | |
| 2023 | Gyeonggi LBFS | 3–0 | Nowon FS | |
| 2024 | Gyeonggi LBFS | 5–1 | Daegu FS | |
| 2025 | Gyeonggi LBFS | 3–0 | Seoul Eunpyeong ZD Sports | |

=== Titles by club ===
| Club | Champions | Runners-up | Seasons won | Seasons runner-up |
|---|---|---|---|---|
| Nowon FS | 5 | 5 | 2010, 2011, 2012, 2019, 2022 | 2016, 2017, 2020, 2021, 2023 |
| Jeonju MAG | 4 | 3 | 2013, 2014, 2017, 2018 | 2010, 2012, 2015 |
| Fantasia Bucheon | 3 | 1 | 2016, 2020, 2021 | 2013 |
| Gyeonggi LBFS | 3 | 1 | 2023, 2024, 2025 | 2022 |
| Chungbuk Jecheon | 1 | 0 | 2015 | — |
| Yongin FS | 0 | 1 | — | 2011 |
| Dream Hub Gunsan | 0 | 1 | — | 2014 |
| Yes Gumi | 0 | 1 | — | 2018 |
| Goyang Bulls | 0 | 1 | — | 2019 |
| Daegu FS | 0 | 1 | — | 2024 |
| Seoul Eunpyeong ZD Sports | 0 | 1 | — | 2025 |
