= Kyrgyz Football Union =

Governing body of football in Kyrgyzstan

Kyrgyz Football Union Кыргызский футбольный союз
AFC
- Short name: FFKR
- Founded: 1992 as Football Federation of Kyrgyz Republic
- Headquarters: Bishkek
- FIFA affiliation: 1994
- AFC affiliation: 1993 (associate member) 1994
- CAFA affiliation: 2015
- President: Kanatbek Mamatov
- Website: kfu.kg

The Kyrgyz Football Union (KFU; Kyrgyz: Кыргыз футболдук союзу, Kyrgyz futbolduk sojuzu, Russian: Кыргызский футбольный союз, Kyrgyzskiy futbol'nyy soyuz) is the governing body of football in Kyrgyzstan. The organization controls the Kyrgyzstan national football team, Kyrgyzstan national futsal team and sponsors the Kyrgyz Professional Football League.

== Competitions controlled by the Federation ==
- Kyrgyz Premier League
- Kyrgyzstan League Second Level
- Kyrgyzstan Cup
- Kyrgyzstan Super Cup
- Kyrgyzstan Futsal League
- Kyrgyzstan Women's Championship

== Executives ==
Name	Position	Source
(Kyrgyzstan) Kanat Mamatov	President	
(Kyrgyzstan) Askar Salymbekov	Vice President	
(Kyrgyzstan) Omurbek Kutuyev	2nd Vice President	
(Kyrgyzstan) Dastanbek Konobayev	3rd Vice President	
(Kyrgyzstan) Mederbek Sydykov	General Secretary	
(Kyrgyzstan) Ainur Kulzhayeva	Treasurer	
(Kyrgyzstan) Anarbek Ormombekov	Technical Director	
(Slovakia) Štefan Tarkovič	Men's team coach	
(Kyrgyzstan) Valery Berezovsky	Women's team coach	
(Kyrgyzstan) Natalia Ugriumova	Media/Communications Manager	
(Kyrgyzstan) Amirzhan Mukanov	Futsal Coordinator	
(Kyrgyzstan) Emil Busurmankulov	Referee Coordinator	
