= Nidaros Futsal =

Nidaros
- Full name: Nidaros Futsal
- Founded: 2003
- Ground: Dragvoll Idrettsenter; Trondheim, Norway
- League: Norwegian Futsal Premier League
- 2009–10: 3rd
| Home colours | Away colours |

Nidaros Futsal is a futsal club based in Trondheim, Norway, the club was founded in 2003. They won the first official Norwegian Futsal Premier League in 2008–09.

== Current squad ==
Note: Flags indicate national team as defined under FIFA eligibility rules; some limited exceptions apply. Players may hold more than one non-FIFA nationality.

| No. | Pos. | Nation | Player |
|---|---|---|---|
| — | GK | (Norway) NOR | Martin Fløystad |
| — | GK | (Norway) NOR | Ole Morten Lødin |
| — | DF | (Norway) NOR | Anders Mordal |
| — | DF | (Norway) NOR | Morten Sandvær |
| — | DF | (Norway) NOR | Stig Kammen |
| — | DF | (Norway) NOR | Bjørn Martin Saur |
| — | DF | (Norway) NOR | Anders Austeng |
| — | DF | (Norway) NOR | Stian Reinertsen |
| — | DF | (Norway) NOR | Christoffer Søndbø |

| No. | Pos. | Nation | Player |
|---|---|---|---|
| — | FW | (Norway) NOR | Runar Skippervik |
| — | FW | (Norway) NOR | Morten Ravlo |
| — | FW | (Norway) NOR | Trond B. Erichsen |
| — | FW | (Norway) NOR | Ali Darisio |
| — | FW | (Norway) NOR | André M. Larsen |
| — | FW | (Norway) NOR | Truls Håkon Helland |
| — | FW | (Norway) NOR | Nils D. Seip |
| — | FW | (Norway) NOR | Sindre Skippervik |
| — | FW | (Norway) NOR | Daniel Krogstad |

== Honours ==
- Norwegian Futsal Premier League: 2008–09
