= 2012 Melbourne Heart FC (Futsal) season =

Melbourne Heart
2012 season
- Chairman: (Australia) Peter Sidwell
- Coach: (Australia) Edgard Vatcky
- F-League Premiership: 7th
Home colours	Away colours

The 2012 season will be Melbourne Heart's first season in the F-League.

== Players ==
No.	Name	Position	Country of Birth	Nationality	Year of Birth
1	Claudio Palmeri	Goalkeeper (capt.)	(Italy)	(Italy) (Australia)	1987
2	Gianni Romano	Defender	(Australia)	(Australia)	1988
3	Ilir Pali	Flanker	(Australia)	(Australia)	1995
4	Lev Lewis	Flanker	(Australia)	(Australia)	1991
5	Callum Davies	Pivot	(Australia)	(Australia)	1993
6	David Filonzi	Flanker	(Australia)	(Australia)	1992
7	Hamid Hassanikhoo	Flanker	(Iran)	(Iran) (Australia)	1983
8	Muhammed (Moe) Tankir	Defender	(Australia)	(Australia)	1988
9	Anthony Ramzy	Flanker	(Australia)	(Australia)	1991
10	Adrian Fruscalzo	Defender	(Australia)	(Australia)	1992
11	Hossain Mirzaie	Pivot	(Iran)	(Iran)	1990
12	Dianoosh Rasoulzadeh	Goalkeeper	(Iran)	(Iran)	1988
13	Matthew Vragovski	Flanker	(Australia)	(Australia)	1995
14	Luke Cardamone	Defender	(Australia)	(Australia)	1992
15	Konrad Machoy	Flanker	(Australia)	(Australia)	1994
16	Vinicius (Vinny) De Carvalho Leite	Pivot	(Brazil)	(Brazil)	1984
17	Shayan Rashidi	Defender	(Iran)	(Iran) (Australia)	1991
18	Carlos Munoz	Flanker	(Australia)	(Chile)	1986
19	Doron (Doz) Pozniak	Defender	(Australia)	(Australia)	1982
20	Francesco Chiarella	Goalkeeper	(Australia)	(Australia)	1972

Note: Flags indicate national team as has been defined under FIFA eligibility rules. Players may hold more than one non-FIFA nationality.

== 2012 hummel F-League ==
Kick-off times are in AEDT

9 June 2012 1	Boomerangs FS	2 – 1	Melbourne Heart	YMCA Derrimut, Derrimut, Victoria
Saturday, 13:00 AEST		Report

10 June 2012 2	Parramatta Blues	6 – 0	Melbourne Heart	YMCA Derrimut, Derrimut, Victoria
Sunday, 10:00 AEST		Report

10 June 2012 3	St Albans Strikers	5 – 3	Melbourne Heart	YMCA Derrimut, Derrimut, Victoria
Sunday, 18:00 AEST		Report

23 June 2012 4	Melbourne Heart	3 - 4	Vic Vipers Futsal Club	Morris Iemma Indoor Sports Centre, Riverwood, NSW
Saturday, 11:00 AEST		Report

24 June 2012 5	Melbourne Heart	1 - 5	Dural Warriors	Morris Iemma Indoor Sports Centre, Riverwood, NSW
Sunday, 8:00 AEST		Report

24 June 2012 6	Melbourne Heart	1 - 6	East Coast Heat F.C.	Morris Iemma Indoor Sports Centre, Riverwood, NSW
Sunday, 16:00 AEST		Report

21 July 2012 7	Parramatta Blues	6 - 2	Melbourne Heart	AIS Training Halls, Canberra, ACT
Saturday, 11:00 AEST

21 July 2012 8	Boomerangs FS	4 - 2	Melbourne Heart	AIS Training Halls, Canberra, ACT
Saturday, 20:00 AEST

22 July 2012 9	Jaguars Futbal Sala Club	1 - 6	Melbourne Heart	AIS Training Halls, Canberra, ACT
Sunday, 12:00 AEST

18 August 2012 10	Melbourne Heart	9 - 3	St Albans Strikers FC	YMCA Derrimut, Derrimut, Victoria
Saturday, 9:00 AEST

18 August 2012 11	Melbourne Heart	1 - 2	East Coast Heat F.C.	YMCA Derrimut, Derrimut, Victoria
Saturday, 18:00 AEST

19 August 2012 12	Melbourne Heart	3 - 7	Dural Warriors	YMCA Derrimut, Derrimut, Victoria
Sunday, 16:00 AEST

8 September 2012 13	Melbourne Heart	4 - 4	Vic Vipers Futsal Club	Morris Iemma Indoor Sports Centre, Riverwood, NSW
Saturday, 11:00 AEST

9 September 2012 14	Melbourne Heart	6 - 3	Jaguars Futbal Sala Club	Morris Iemma Indoor Sports Centre, Riverwood, NSW
Sunday, 13:00 AEST

=== Results ===
==== Results by round ====
Round	1	2	3	4	5	6	7	8	9	10	11	12	13	14
Result	L	L	L	L	L	L	L	L	W	W	L	L	D	W
Position	5	7	7	8	8	8	8	8	7	7	7	8	8	7

Source: sportingpulse.com
W = Win; D = Draw; L = Loss
