= Melbourne Heart FC (futsal) =

Melbourne Heart Futsal
- Full name: Melbourne Heart FC Futsal
- Founded: 2012
- Dissolved: 2014
- League: F-League
Home colours	Away colours

Melbourne Heart FC (futsal) was the futsal team of Melbourne Heart Football Club (now known as Melbourne City) based in Melbourne, Victoria, founded in 2012. They played in the F-League, the top tier of Australian Futsal. The club was disbanded before the start of the 2014 season after the A-League team were bought by Manchester City FC.

== History ==
Melbourne Heart FC Futsal was established in 2012 after a partnership between the Cobras Futsal Club and Melbourne Heart FC. The two clubs teamed up to create a new futsal senior men's team who compete in the national F-League competition.

Although founded only in 2008, Melbourne Heart shows a firm commitment to growing the club into a total football club. Cobras Futsal Club started in 2006 and is one of the pioneer clubs in the FFV Melbourne Futsal League. Cobras boast having the largest number of Football Federation Victoria registered participants and teams in the MFL and State representative players in 2011. Cobras Futsal Club's core existence is the development of Futsal players and promoting of the Futsal sport.

Melbourne Heart's Football Operations Manager, John Didulica described the move to have a futsal program as pivotal to their footballing and cultural make-up.

"Eighteen months ago we spoke with Cobras (Futsal Club, based in Bulleen) about some involvement because I always wanted a futsal platform within the club, and its another area for fans to engage in. We said we'd keep in touch and when they were serious about getting into the F-League, we gave them our full support to get it across the line." "It's not just a branding, because we're actually going to develop some joint synergies. Player selection, coaching and player interaction are important and (jokingly) I’ve always left the door for our South Americans to get on the teamsheet."

The partnership between Heart and the Cobras intends venturing Futsal in Australia to the next level. After the final round of the 2012 Hummel F-League, the Australian Futsal National team coach invited Anthony Ramzy to train with the National squad, providing Melbourne Heart Futsal with their first player called into a National Squad.

Following the take-over of Melbourne Heart by the City Football Group, the decision was taken not to continue operating the futsal team, which then disbanded.

== Players ==
=== 2012 squad ===
The following players were selected for the 2012 F-League tournament, released on 3 June 2012.

No.	Name	Position	Country of Birth	Nationality	Year of Birth
1	Ryan Timmins (captain)	Goalkeeper	(Australia)	(Australia)	1988
2	Gianni Romano	Defender	(Australia)	(Australia)	1988
3	Jordan Michaelis	Defender	(Australia)	(Australia)	1993
4	Fikri Bozdogan	Flanker	(Australia)	(Australia)	1988
5	Callum Davies	Pivot	(Australia)	(Australia)	1993
6	Tuan Cao	Target	(Vietnam)	(Australia)	1983
8	Muhammed (Moe) Tankir	Defender	(Australia)	(Australia)	1988
9	Anthony Ramzy	Flanker	(Australia)	(Australia)	1991
10	Aaron Yu	Goal Keeper	(Hong Kong)	(Australia)	1992
11	Cesur Cicekdag	Defender	(Australia)	(Australia)	1987
12	Mehmet Parlak	Flanker	(Australia)	(Australia)	1988
13	Matthew Vragovski	Flanker	(Australia)	(Australia)	1995
14	Christian Skok	Flanker	(Australia)	(Australia)	1993
15	Konrad Machoy	Flanker	(Australia)	(Australia)	1994
17	Rasoul Bahmani	Flanker	(Iran)	(Iran) (Australia)	1985
18	Scott Fenn	Flanker	(Australia)	(Australia)	1988

== See also ==
- 2012 Melbourne Heart Futsal season
- Melbourne Heart FC
- F-League
