= Campeonato Brasileiro de Futsal =

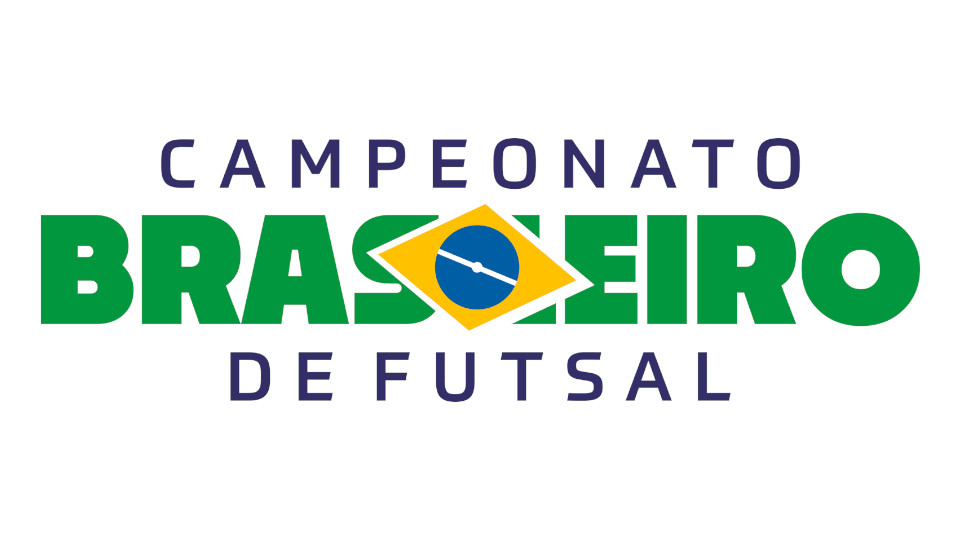
- First season: 2024
- Country: Brazil
- Confederation: CONMEBOL
- Number of clubs: 10
- Level on pyramid: 1st (First division)
- Sponsor(s): Penalty

The Campeonato Brasileiro de Futsal (English: Brazilian Futsal Championship) is a men's futsal competition between clubs in Brazil. It is organized by the Brazilian Futsal Confederation (CBFS), after they broke relations with the Liga Nacional de Futsal. Founded in 2023, the champions will qualify to the Supercopa do Brasil de Futsal starting with its 2025 edition, whose champion qualifies for Brazil to the Copa Libertadores de Futsal.

== History ==
Since the 1990s, the main futsal competition in Brazil had been the Liga Nacional de Futsal (LNF), organized independently by the clubs. Although the CBFS retained official institutional recognition from the Brazilian Football Confederation (CBF) and international governing bodies, the LNF became the country's leading national tournament throughout the 1990s and 2000s. The relationship between the CBFS and the LNF was marked by disagreements over the following decades, particularly regarding calendar management, territorial representation, and the qualification criteria for international competitions.

In 2023, the CBFS announced the creation of the Brazilian Futsal Championship. According to the confederation, the competition was established to expand the tournament's geographical reach and reaffirm the CBFS's role as the official organizer of futsal in Brazil. The inaugural edition featured traditional Brazilian football clubs that either maintained or resumed futsal programs, including América Mineiro, América de Natal, Ceará, Cruzeiro, Fortaleza, Sport Recife, and Vasco da Gama, alongside clubs already established in futsal. CBFS president Marcos Madeira stated that the creation of the tournament was part of a project initiated in 2015, when he assumed the presidency of the confederation.

== Teams ==
The 10 clubs participating in the third edition of the championship (2026).

Team	City	State
Chapecoense	Chapecó	Santa Catarina
Sorriso	Sorriso	Mato Grosso
Traipu	Traipu	Alagoas
Fazenda	Fazenda Rio Grande	Paraná
Magé	Magé	Rio de Janeiro
Atlético Piauiense	Teresina	Piauí
São João do Jaguaribe	São João do Jaguaribe	Ceará
Criciúma	Criciúma	Santa Catarina
América Mineiro	Belo Horizonte	Minas Gerais
São José	Macapá	Amapá

== Honours ==
=== List of champions ===
Brazilian Futsal Championship
Edition	Year	Champions	Runners-up
I	2024	Fortaleza	Apodi
II	2025	Atlético Piauiense	Traipu

=== Titles by club ===
Club	Champions	Runners-up	Championship years	Runner-up years
Fortaleza	1	0	2024	
Atlético Piauiense	1	0	2025	
Apodi	0	1		2024
Traipu	0	1		2025

=== Titles by states ===
Club	Champions	Runners-up	Championship years	Runner-up years
Ceará	1	0	2024	
Piauí	1	0	2025	
Rio Grande do Norte	0	1		2024
Alagoas	0	1		2025
