= Kyrgyzstan Futsal League =

- Country: Kyrgyzstan
- Confederation: AFC
- Number of clubs: 10
- Level on pyramid: 1
- International cup: AFC Futsal Club Championship
- Current champions: Nalogovik (2011)
- Current: Kyrgyzstan Futsal League 2019

The Kyrgyzstan Futsal League, is the top league for Futsal in Kyrgyzstan. The winning team obtains the participation right to the AFC Futsal Club Championship.

== Champions ==
Season	1st place, gold medalist(s)	2nd place, silver medalist(s)	3rd place, bronze medalist(s)
2007	ATF Bishkek		
2008	AUB Bishkek		
2009	ATF Bishkek	AUB Altyn Tash Bishkek	Nalogovik Bishkek
2010	Nalogovik Bishkek	AUB Altyn Tash Bishkek	Adilet Bishkek
2011	Nalogovik Bishkek	Spartak Batken	Khimik Kara-Balta
