= Hong Kong Futsal League =

- Founded: 2010
- Country: Hong Kong
- Confederation: AFC
- Number of clubs: 7
- Level on pyramid: 1
- Current: 2019–20

Hong Kong Futsal League (Chinese: 香港五人足球聯賽) is the official futsal league held by Hong Kong Football Association, established in 2010. For sponsorship reasons it is known also as the Jockey Club Futsal League.

== Top Division Teams in 2018–19 ==
List from HKFA

- Wong Tai Sin
- Resources Capital FC
- Tuen Mun
- Mutual
- Pak Hei
- Hoi King
- Eastern District
