= Campionato Sammarinese di Futsal =

Futsal championship in San Marino

- Founded: 2006
- Country: San Marino
- Confederation: UEFA
- Number of clubs: 16
- Level on pyramid: 1
- International cup: UEFA Futsal Cup
- Current champions: San Giovanni (2010–11)
- Most championships: Tre Fiori, San Giovanni (2 titles)
- Current: Current Season at UEFA.com

The San Marino Futsal Championship is the premier futsal championship in San Marino. It was founded in 2006. The San Marino championship currently consists of 12 teams. Organized by Federazione Sammarinese Giuoco Calcio.

== Champions ==
Season	Winner
2006/2007	Cosmos
2007/2008	Tre Fiori
2008/2009	Tre Fiori
2009/2010	San Giovanni
2010/2011	San Giovanni
