= São João do Jaguaribe =

Municipality in Ceará, Brazil

Coordinates: 5°16′S 38°16′W

- Municipality
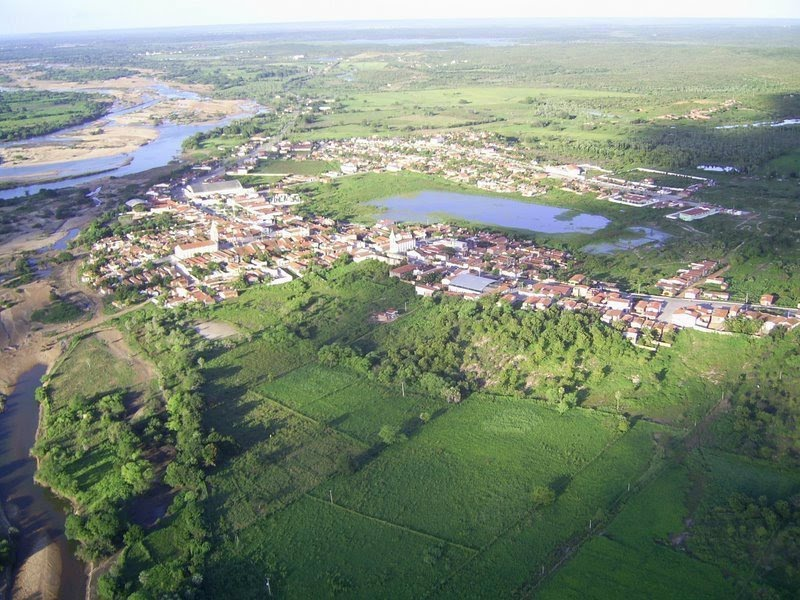

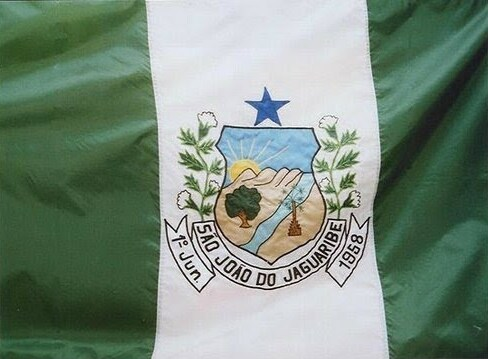
- Flag
- Interactive map of São João do Jaguaribe
- Country: Brazil
- Region: Nordeste
- State: Ceará
- Mesoregion: Jaguaribe

Population (2020)
  - Total: 7,601
- Time zone: UTC−3 (BRT)

São João do Jaguaribe is a municipality in the state of Ceará in the Northeast region of Brazil.

== See also ==
- List of municipalities in Ceará
