= FK-League =

- Organising body: Korea Futsal League
- Founded: 2009
- Country: South Korea
- Confederation: AFC
- Divisions: FK-League 1 FK-League 2
- Number of clubs: 12
- Level on pyramid: 1–2
- Domestic cup: FK Cup
- International cup: AFC Futsal Club Championship
- Current champions: Gyeonggi LBFS (2025–26)
- Most championships: Nowon FS; Jeonju MAG (6 titles each)
- Website: www.futsal.or.kr

The FK-League (Korean: FK리그) is the South Korean semi-professional futsal league, organized by Korea Futsal League. It was launched in 2009, and the inaugural season of the league began on 25 December 2009.

== Clubs ==
=== Current clubs ===
As of 2025–26 season

==== FK-League 1 ====
- Gangwon FS
- Goyang Bulls
- Gyeonggi LBFS
- Jeonju Citizen
- Nowon Xenor
- Seoul Eunpyeong Denforce

==== FK-League 2 ====
- Cheongju Palacio
- Daegu FS
- Dream Hub Gunsan
- Gumi FS
- Hwaseong FS
- Incheon Namdong
- Jecheon FC
- Yongin Daeheung

=== Former clubs ===
- Busan Kappa
- Daegu Five Stars
- Daejeon Taeyang
- Gapyeong FS
- Gwanak Field Stone
- Gyeongju Soonwoo
- Hanbang Jecheon
- IFC Daejeon
- Incheon FS
- Jecheon FS
- Seongdong FC
- Seoul FITF
- Seoul Gwangjin
- Siheung Footballeye

== Champions ==
=== Champions by season ===
Season	Champions	Runners-up	Ref.
2009–10	Jeonju MAG	FS Seoul	
2010–11	FS Seoul	Jeonju MAG	
2011–12	FS Seoul	Jeonju MAG	
2012–13	Jeonju MAG	Chungbuk Jecheon	
2013–14	Jeonju MAG	Chungbuk Jecheon	
2014–15	Jeonju MAG	FS Seoul	
2015–16	Yes Gumi	Fantasia Bucheon	
2016–17	Jeonju MAG	FS Seoul	
2017–18	Jeonju MAG	Star FS Seoul	
2018–19	Star FS Seoul	Jeonju MAG	
2019–20	Star FS Seoul	Jeonju MAG	
2020–21	Star FS Seoul	Seoul Eunpyeong Ninetyplus	
2021–22	Nowon FS	Yes Gumi	
2022–23	Gyeonggi LBFS	Nowon FS	
2023–24	Gyeonggi LBFS	Nowon Sunderland	
2024–25	Gyeonggi LBFS	Seoul Eunpyeong ZD Sports	
2025–26	Gyeonggi LBFS	Nowon Xenor	

=== Performance by club ===
Club	Champions	Runners-up	Seasons won	Seasons runner-up
Nowon Xenor	6	7	2010–11, 2011–12, 2018–19, 2019–20, 2020–21, 2021–22	2009–10, 2014–15, 2016–17, 2017–18, 2022–23, 2023–24, 2025–26
Jeonju MAG	6	4	2009–10, 2012–13, 2013–14, 2014–15, 2016–17, 2017–18	2010–11, 2011–12, 2018–19, 2019–20
Gyeonggi LBFS	4	0	2022–23, 2023–24, 2024–25, 2025–26	—
Yes Gumi	1	1	2015–16	2021–22
Chungbuk Jecheon	0	2	—	2012–13, 2013–14
Fantasia Bucheon	0	1	—	2015–16
Seoul Eunpyeong ZD Sports	0	2	—	2020–21, 2024–25

=== Champions by season (League 2) ===
Season	Champions	Runners-up	Ref.
2017–18	Goyang Bulls	Seoul Eunpyeong	
2018–19	Seoul Eunpyeong	Yongin Daeheung	
2019–20	Cheongju FS	Yongin Daeheung	
2020–21	Jecheon FS	Incheon AGON	
2021–22	Gyeonggi LBFS	Yongin Daeheung	
2022–23	Goyang Bulls	Gangwon FS	
2023–24	Jeonju MAG	Incheon ALTong	
2024–25	Goyang Bulls	Seongdong FC	
2025–26	Yongin Daeheung	Gumi FS	
