= 2011 Kyrgyzstan Futsal League =

== Kyrgyzstan Futsal League 2011 standings ==
Champion of Kyrgyzstan Futsal League 2011 is Nalogovik Bishkek.

Best player: Zakir Kasimov (Spartak Batken) and Vadim Kryakovskiy (Khimik Kara-Balta)

Best goalkeeper: Erkin Rasulov (Nalogovik Bishkek)

Best scorer: Rustam İsayev (Nalogovik Bishkek)

Pos	Club	Pld	W	D	L	Gf	GA	Pts
1	Nalogovik Bishkek	12	11	1	0	37	7	34
2	Spartak Batken	12	6	2	4	20	19	20
3	Khimik Kara-Balta	12	5	1	6	17	22	16
4	Abdısh-Ata Kant	12	0	0	12	6	29	0

- Kyrgyzstan Bishkek Premiere League 2010/2011

== League standings ==
Pos	Club	Pld	W	D	L	Gf	GA	Pts
1	Nalogovik-1	18	16	1	1	90	29	49
2	Greenwich Club	18	13	3	2	61	31	42
3	Bank Asii	18	11	1	6	56	43	34
4	Jannat	18	10	2	6	63	45	32
5	Emir	18	9	4	5	48	55	31
6	Chon-Tash	17	8	3	6	64	65	27
7	San&Co.	18	8	2	8	55	43	26
8	Bulat	17	7	1	94	49	53	22
9	RSK Bank	17	7	7	8	48	39	23
10	Ak-Jol	17	7	2	8	57	58	23
11	Nalogovik-2	17	6	1	10	55	53	19
12	Kumtor	17	4	2	11	58	77	14
13	Jetigen	17	1	2	14	36	78	5
