= Futsal in Norway =

In Norway, the 5-a-side indoor football version Futsal is one of the most growing sports.

== Organization ==
The actual administration of leagues/series is divided between:

1. The Football Association of Norway (NFF) – member of UEFA/FIFA
2. Indoor Football Scandinavia (IFS) – member of AMF / UEFS

This due to several factors which is ultimately a dispute between FIFA and AMF:

- Income and revenues organization
- Organization model
- Requirements
- Laws of the game

=== NFF Futsal ===
NFF is a member organization of the Norwegian Sports Federation (NIF)/Norwegian Olympic Committee (NOK), and by common law is recognized as a self governing authority for all organized football by the Norwegian state.

The highest authority of the NFF is the annual general assembly where all clubs are represented, and has the right of vote and speech. Therefore, NFF is ultimately controlled by independent (the club must be own by themselves not by any co-operate/organization) member clubs and local football associations. This in turn is controlled by the individual member of a club (democratic checks and balances).

A player is required to be a member of a club which are members of the NFF and pay licenses to compete, submit to official doping test, is a subject to the laws of the game and official decisions made by the International Football Association Board (IFAB)/FIFA and can be given disciplinary sanctions which are universal. This will result in that the player has official legal status as an eligible player in all league or international matches. And can officially claim the title (if one is a member of the national team that wins) as Norwegian Futsal Champion or FIFA Futsal World Champion.

Teams must meet certain organizational requirements and pay annual fees to the NFF. The NFF Futsal laws of the game is in accordance with FIFA Futsal rules, the critical difference is:

- NFF Futsal laws of the game do practise accumulation of direct free kicks
- A sending off will result in an automatically one match suspension or if more serious several match suspensions, that may be transferred to the 11-a-side (ordinary outdoor football) season
- All referees is required to use certified by the NFF, and has passed annual written and physical test. They are ranked based on this and their performance.

=== IFS Futsal ===
- Since IFS is not a member of the NIF/NOK, the organization has no official status as a sporting organization within NIF/NOK. Nevertheless, IFS is a member of the International and European Futsal Association. IFS has during its start in 1998 proclaimed that the organization and the teams should be independent from the official Norwegian sport organizations.
- Businesses/financial/social organizations may own teams
- No teams are member of official sporting associations, but registered within the IFS -futsal system
- IFS is recognized as legal authority under the flag of The International Futsal Association (AMF) and The European Futsal Union (UEFS)
- No requirements for how clubs are organized - the team decide for themselves how to organize their financial, social and activity structure

== Leagues and Series ==
=== NFF Futsal ===
The NFF has started up qualification for nationwide premiership league, 1st, 2nd 3rd divisions / regional / local F.A series. The final make up of the NFF futsal organization will be cemented in 2008 after the qualification and after decisions made by the NFF and its general assembly.

Link to FIFA / NFF Futsal site (only in Norwegian)

- NFF Homepage
- UEFA homepage
- FIFA Futsal homepage

=== IFS Futsal ===
The IFS premiership consists of eight series:

- Oslo
- Bergen
- Trondheim
- Stavanger
- Kristiansand
- Møre og Romsdal
- Vestfold
- Østfold

Norwegian indoor-league with around 50 nationwide tournaments as qualifying rounds

- About 30.000 participants annually

- Over 25.000 teams has been registered

- No recurring obligations - each team has to sign up for every tournament they would like to attend. No running membership

- Diversity - both for teams with high ambitions and a stable participation, as well as for teams who focus more on the social aspect of futsal

Final rounds: How far a team gets in the single tournaments finals will decide how many points the team achieves on the "marathon-ranking" for that specific city. The winning team gets 7 points, the second runner up gets 6 points, and so on. When the season is over, the Top 15 teams on the "marathon-ranking" in every city will meet for the ultimate finale rounds (Norwegian Futsal Championship).

IFS Futsal
