= NFF Futsal Eliteserie =

NFF Eliteserien Futsal
- Founded: 2008
- Country: Norway
- Confederation: UEFA
- Number of clubs: 10
- Relegation to: First Division
- Domestic cup: Norwegian Futsal Cup
- International cup: UEFA Futsal Champions League
- Current champions: Utleira (2025-26)
- Broadcaster(s): Direktesport
- Website: fotball.no

The Norwegian Futsal Premier League is the top division for men's futsal in Norway. Its official Norwegian name is NFF Eliteserien Futsal.

== Format ==
=== Competition ===
There are 10 clubs in the Norwegian Futsal Premier League. During the course of a season, each club plays the others twice, for a total of 18 games for each club, and a total of 90 games in a season. The season starts in late-October and lasts until mid-March. Matches are mostly played over a number weekends during the winter months with a short break during the Christmas holiday and New Year.

Teams receive three points for a win and one point for a draw. No points are awarded for a loss. Teams are ranked by total points, then goal difference, goals scored, and then head-to-head records used to separate teams on equal points. At the end of each season, the club with the most points is crowned "Champions". The two lowest placed teams are automatically relegated to the First Division and will be replaced by two teams from a playoff tournament in the First Division.

=== European qualification ===
The winners of the Norwegian Futsal Premier League qualifies for the UEFA Futsal Champions League preliminary round.

== Members for 2026–27 ==
The following 10 clubs are competing in the Norwegian Futsal Premier League during the 2026-27 season:

Club	Region	Placement previous season
Bossekop	Finnmark	8th
Gamle Oslo	Oslo	6th
HSIL	Oslo	5th
KFUM	Oslo	4th
NTNUI	Trøndelag	7th
Sjarmtrollan	Troms	2nd
Skjetten	Akerhus	Promoted
Skånland	Hålogaland	Promoted
Utleira	Trøndelag	1st
Vesterålen	Hålogaland	3rd
