= Jeonju MAG FC =

- Full name: Jeonju Made Axis Glory Futsal Club
- Founded: 2009; 17 years ago
- Ground: Palbok Ground
- Head coach: Lee Young-Jin
- League: FK-League
Home colours	Away colours

Jeonju Made Axis Glory Futsal Club, commonly known as Jeonju MAG FC (Korean: 전주 매그 FC), is a South Korean professional futsal club based in Jeonju, Jeollabuk-do. The club was founded in December 2009, in the same month when the inaugural season of the FK-League, the South Korean semi-professional futsal league, was launched.

== Honors ==
- FK-League
  - Champions (4) : 2009–10, 2012–13, 2013–14, 2014–15
  - Runners-up (2) : 2010–11, 2011–12
- FK Cup
  - champions (2) : 2013, 2014
  - Runners-up (2) : 2010, 2012
