= Seoul Gwangjin FC =

- Full name: Seoul Gwangjin Futsal Club
- Short name: SGFC
- Founded: 2009
- Ground: Acha Mountain Futsal Ground
- Head Coach: Jang Sung-Dae
- League: FK-League
- 2013–14 Season: Group A, 3rd
Home colours	Away colours

Seoul Gwangjin FC (Korean: 서울 광진 FC) is a South Korean futsal club based in Gwangjin-gu, Seoul. The club was founded in October 2009.
