= Yongin Daeheung FS =

- Full name: Yongin Futsal
- Founded: 2009
- Ground: Yongin Gymnasium
- Head Coach: Kim Sung-Yong
- League: FK-League
- 2010–11: 4th
Home colours	Away colours

Yongin Daeheung FS (Korean: 용인 대흥 FS) is a South Korean professional futsal club based in Yongin, Gyeonggi-do. The club was founded in November 2009.

== Name History ==
- 2009 : Founded as Yongin TMT Futsal Club
- 2010 : Renamed Yongin FutSal

== Honors ==
- FK Cup
  - Runners-up (1) : 2011
