= Nowon FS =

South Korean futsal club

FS Seoul
- Full name: Futsal Seoul
- Short name: FSS
- Founded: 2009; 17 years ago
- Ground: Songpa Futsal Ground
- Head coach: Lee Chang-hwan
- League: FK-League
Home colours	Away colours

FS Seoul (Korean: FS 서울) is a South Korean professional futsal club based in Songpa-gu, Seoul. The club was founded in December 2009, in the same month when the FK-League was launched.

== Honors ==
- FK-League
  - Champions (1) : 2010–11
  - Runners-up (1) : 2009–10
- FK Cup
  - Champions (2) : 2010, 2011
