= Gumi FS =

Gumi FC
- Full name: Yes Gumi Futsal Club
- Founded: 2009; 17 years ago
- Ground: Jisan Futsal Ground
- Head Coach: Lee Sang-Jin
- League: FK-League
Home colours	Away colours

Gumi FS (Korean: 구미 FS) is a South Korean professional futsal club based in Gumi, Gyeongsangbuk-do. The club was founded in October 2009. It competes in the South Korean semi-professional FK-League.
