= 2017 Futsal Thai League =

Futsal Thai League
- Season: 2017
- Champions: PTT Bluewave Chonburi
- Relegated: Nakhon Ratchasima V-One; Nonthaburi Futsal Club
- AFC Futsal Club Champ.: PTT Bluewave Chonburi
- AFF Futsal Club Championship: Bangkok BTS
- Matches: 182
- Top goalscorer: (Thailand) Nawin Rattanawongsawat (24 goals)

2017 Futsal Thai League (also known as AIS Futsal Thai League for sponsorship reasons) is top-tier professional futsal league under the Football Association of Thailand (FAT) and Advanced Info Service (AIS)'s control. This is the ninth edition of the league. A total of 14 teams join the league. The league is going to begin in March, 2017.

== Teams ==
Promoted teams

Sisaket and Thakham Cold Storage were promote from 2016 Thai Division 1 Futsal League

Relegated teams

Northeastern University - Khonkaen and CAT Telecom were relegated from 2016 Futsal Thailand League

Team	Province	Home stadium	Capacity
BTS Bangkok Futsal Club	Bangkok	His Majesty the King's 72nd Birthday Anniversary Gymnasium	2,000
Bangkok City Futsal Club	Bangkok	Thai-Japanese Youth Centre Hall 2	1,300
PTT Bluewave Chonburi Futsal Club	Chonburi	Bluewave Arena	3,000
Department of Highways Futsal Club	Bangkok	Plaibang Municipality Gymnasium	200
Kasem Bundit Futsal Club	Bangkok	12th floor Kasem Bundit University Gymnasium Romklao Campus	500
Pattaya Thai-Tech Futsal Club	Pattaya	Muang Pattaya 2 School Gymnasium	500
Nakhon Ratchasima V-One Futsal Club	Nakhon Ratchasima	Korat Chatchai Hall	5,000
Nonthaburi Futsal Club	Nonthaburi	Plaibang Municipality Gymnasium	200
ThaiPort Futsal Club	Bangkok	Port Authority of Thailand Futsal Pitch	200
Rajnavy Futsal club	Samut Prakan	Bhuti-anan Gymnasium	100
Samut Sakhon Futsal Club	Samut Sakhon	Samut Sakhon Wutthichai School Gymnasium	500
Surat Thani Futsal Club	Surat Thani	Chang Tapee Arena	4,500
Sisaket Futsal Club	Sisaket	Siriwanwalee Building, Sisaket Rajabhat University	1,000
Thakham Cold Storage Futsal Club	Samut Songkhram	Samut Sakhon Wutthichai School Gymnasium	500

== League table ==
Pos	Team	Pld	W	D	L	GF	GA	GD	Pts	Qualification or relegation
1	PTT Bluewave Chonburi Futsal Club	26	20	2	4	119	64	+55	62	AFC Futsal Club Championship (group stage)
2	ThaiPort Futsal Club	26	19	3	4	104	56	+48	60	AFF Futsal Club Championship (group stage)
3	BTS Bangkok Futsal Club	26	16	5	5	104	62	+42	53	
4	Surat Thani Futsal Club	26	15	3	8	95	83	+12	48	
5	Kasem Bundit Futsal Club	26	14	6	6	77	59	+18	48	
6	Samut Sakhon Futsal Club	26	13	3	10	77	68	+9	42	
7	Department of Highways Futsal Club	26	10	8	8	75	66	+9	38	
8	Thakham Cold Storage Futsal Club	26	11	2	13	81	90	−9	35	
9	Rajnavy Futsal club	26	9	5	12	83	77	+6	32	
10	Sisaket Futsal Club	26	8	3	15	69	88	−19	27	
11	Pattaya Thai-Tech Futsal Club	26	8	3	15	83	110	−27	27	
12	Bangkok City Futsal Club	26	6	2	18	83	116	−33	20	
13	Nonthaburi Futsal Club	26	5	3	18	58	102	−44	18	Relegation to the 2018 Futsal Thailand League Division 1
14	Nakhon Ratchasima V-One Futsal Club	26	3	2	21	63	127	−64	11	Relegation to the 2018 Futsal Thailand League Division 1

== Results ==
Results of the 2017 Futsal Thailand League.

Week 1
N.	Date	Time	Home team	Results	Away team
1	2017-03-18	16.00	Pattaya Thai-Tech Futsal Club	6-4	Nakhon Ratchasima V-One Futsal Club
2	2017-03-18	16.00	Thakham Cold Storage Futsal Club	3-6	BTS Bangkok Futsal Club
3	2017-03-18	18.00	Nonthaburi Futsal Club	2-1	Rajnavy Futsal club
4	2017-03-18	18.00	Kasem Bundit Futsal Club	3-0	Surat Thani Futsal Club
5	2017-03-19	16.00	PTT Bluewave Chonburi Futsal Club	1-2	ThaiPort Futsal Club
6	2017-03-19	18.00	Department of Highways Futsal Club	6-3	Bangkok City Futsal Club
7	2017-03-19	18.00	Samut Sakhon Futsal Club	3-1	Sisaket Futsal Club

Week 2
N.	Date	Time	Home team	Results	Away team
8	2017-03-25	16.00	Rajnavy Futsal club	3-3	Kasem Bundit Futsal Club
9	2017-03-25	16.00	Sisaket Futsal Club	2-3	Department of Highways Futsal Club
10	2017-03-25	18.00	Bangkok City Futsal Club	8-1	Nonthaburi Futsal Club
11	2017-03-25	18.00	Surat Thani Futsal Club	3-1	Thakham Cold Storage Futsal Club
12	2017-03-26	16.00	BTS Bangkok Futsal Club	2-1	ThaiPort Futsal Club
13	2017-03-26	16.00	Pattaya Thai-Tech Futsal Club	4-7	PTT Bluewave Chonburi Futsal Club
14	2017-03-26	18.00	Nakhon Ratchasima V-One Futsal Club	2-6	Samut Sakhon Futsal Club

Week 3
N.	Date	Time	Home team	Results	Away team
15	2017-04-01	16.00	Thakham Cold Storage Futsal Club	6-4	Rajnavy Futsal club
16	2017-04-01	16.00	Nonthaburi Futsal Club	6-0	Sisaket Futsal Club
17	2017-04-01	18.00	Kasem Bundit Futsal Club	2-1	Bangkok City Futsal Club
18	2017-04-01	18.00	ThaiPort Futsal Club	6-3	Surat Thani Futsal Club
19	2017-04-02	16.00	PTT Bluewave Chonburi Futsal Club	4-3	BTS Bangkok Futsal Club
20	2017-04-02	18.00	Samut Sakhon Futsal Club	3-1	Pattaya Thai-Tech Futsal Club
21	2017-04-02	18.00	Department of Highways Futsal Club	2-1	Nakhon Ratchasima V-One Futsal Club

Week 4
N.	Date	Time	Home team	Results	Away team
22	2017-04-08	16.00	Nakhon Ratchasima V-One Futsal Club	8-3	Nonthaburi Futsal Club
23	2017-04-08	18.00	Samut Sakhon Futsal Club	2-3	PTT Bluewave Chonburi Futsal Club
24	2017-04-09	16.00	Surat Thani Futsal Club	1-4	BTS Bangkok Futsal Club
25	2017-04-09	16.00	Bangkok City Futsal Club	6-3	Thakham Cold Storage Futsal Club
26	2017-04-09	18.00	Rajnavy Futsal club	4-5	ThaiPort Futsal Club
27	2017-04-09	18.00	Sisaket Futsal Club	1-1	Kasem Bundit Futsal Club
28	2017-04-09	18.00	Pattaya Thai-Tech Futsal Club	6-1	Department of Highways Futsal Club

Week 5
N.	Date	Time	Home team	Results	Away team
29	2017-04-19	14.00	ThaiPort Futsal Club	3-2	Bangkok City Futsal Club
30	2017-04-19	16.00	Nonthaburi Futsal Club	1-4	Pattaya Thai-Tech Futsal Club
31	2017-04-19	16.00	Thakham Cold Storage Futsal Club	2-1	Sisaket Futsal Club
32	2017-04-19	16.00	Kasem Bundit Futsal Club	6-0	Nakhon Ratchasima V-One Futsal Club
33	2017-04-19	18.00	PTT Bluewave Chonburi Futsal Club	5-1	Surat Thani Futsal Club
34	2017-04-19	18.00	BTS Bangkok Futsal Club	3-1	Rajnavy Futsal club
35	2017-04-19	19.00	Department of Highways Futsal Club	1-1	Samut Sakhon Futsal Club

Week 6
N.	Date	Time	Home team	Results	Away team
36	2017-04-22	16.00	Department of Highways Futsal Club	2-2	PTT Bluewave Chonburi Futsal Club
37	2017-04-22	16.00	Samut Sakhon Futsal Club	4-0	Nonthaburi Futsal Club
38	2017-04-23	16.00	Bangkok City Futsal Club	2-5	BTS Bangkok Futsal Club
39	2017-04-23	18.00	Rajnavy Futsal club	8-0	Surat Thani Futsal Club
40	2017-04-23	18.00	Sisaket Futsal Club	3-2	ThaiPort Futsal Club

Week 7
N.	Date	Time	Home team	Results	Away team
41	2017-04-29	16.00	Thakham Cold Storage Futsal Club	4-1	Pattaya Thai-Tech Futsal Club
42	2017-04-29	16.00	ThaiPort Futsal Club	9-1	Nakhon Ratchasima V-One Futsal Club
43	2017-04-29	16.00	Nonthaburi Futsal Club	2-1	Department of Highways Futsal Club
44	2017-04-29	16.00	BTS Bangkok Futsal Club	4-3	Sisaket Futsal Club
45	2017-04-30	18.00	PTT Bluewave Chonburi Futsal Club	3-2	Rajnavy Futsal club
46	2017-04-30	18.00	Kasem Bundit Futsal Club	2-1	Samut Sakhon Futsal Club
47	2017-04-30	18.00	Surat Thani Futsal Club	7-3	Bangkok City Futsal Club

Week 8
N.	Date	Time	Home team	Results	Away team
48	2017-05-06	16.00	Department of Highways Futsal Club	0-1	Kasem Bundit Futsal Club
49	2017-05-06	16.00	Sisaket Futsal Club	1-3	Surat Thani Futsal Club
50	2017-05-06	18.00	Samut Sakhon Futsal Club	3-2	Thakham Cold Storage Futsal Club
51	2017-05-06	18.00	Pattaya Thai-Tech Futsal Club	1-5	PTT Bluewave Chonburi Futsal Club
52	2017-05-07	16.00	Bangkok City Futsal Club	2-6	Rajnavy Futsal club
53	2017-05-07	18.00	Nonthaburi Futsal Club	1-2	ThaiPort Futsal Club
54	2017-05-07	18.00	Nakhon Ratchasima V-One Futsal Club	1-7	BTS Bangkok Futsal Club

Week 9
N.	Date	Time	Home team	Results	Away team
55	2017-05-13	18.00	Surat Thani Futsal Club	7-3	Nakhon Ratchasima V-One Futsal Club
56	2017-05-31	14.00	PTT Bluewave Chonburi Futsal Club	5-3	Bangkok City Futsal Club
57	2017-05-31	16.00	ThaiPort Futsal Club	5-1	Samut Sakhon Futsal Club
58	2017-05-31	16.00	BTS Bangkok Futsal Club	12-2	Pattaya Thai-Tech Futsal Club
59	2017-05-31	18.00	Thakham Cold Storage Futsal Club	4-4	Department of Highways Futsal Club
60	2017-05-31	18.00	Kasem Bundit Futsal Club	5-1	Nonthaburi Futsal Club
61	2017-05-31	18.00	Rajnavy Futsal club	2-4	Sisaket Futsal Club

Week 10
N.	Date	Time	Home team	Results	Away team
62	2017-06-03	16.00	Kasem Bundit Futsal Club	4-6	PTT Bluewave Chonburi Futsal Club
63	2017-06-03	16.00	Pattaya Thai-Tech Futsal Club	3-4	Surat Thani Futsal Club
64	2017-06-03	18.00	Nakhon Ratchasima V-One Futsal Club	0-4	Rajnavy Futsal club
65	2017-06-03	18.00	Nonthaburi Futsal Club	2-1	Thakham Cold Storage Futsal Club
66	2017-06-04	16.00	Department of Highways Futsal Club	1-1	ThaiPort Futsal Club
67	2017-06-04	18.00	Samut Sakhon Futsal Club	3-1	BTS Bangkok Futsal Club
68	2017-06-04	18.00	Sisaket Futsal Club	2-3	Bangkok City Futsal Club

Week 11
N.	Date	Time	Home team	Results	Away team
69	2017-06-10	16.00	Thakham Cold Storage Futsal Club	2-1	Kasem Bundit Futsal Club
70	2017-06-10	16.00	Rajnavy Futsal club	3-2	Pattaya Thai-Tech Futsal Club
71	2017-06-10	18.00	ThaiPort Futsal Club	4-0	Nonthaburi Futsal Club
72	2017-06-10	18.00	PTT Bluewave Chonburi Futsal Club	12-2	Sisaket Futsal Club
73	2017-06-11	16.00	BTS Bangkok Futsal Club	5-4	Department of Highways Futsal Club
74	2017-06-11	18.00	Bangkok City Futsal Club	7-1	Nakhon Ratchasima V-One Futsal Club
75	2017-06-11	18.00	Surat Thani Futsal Club	4-1	Samut Sakhon Futsal Club

Week 12
N.	Date	Time	Home team	Results	Away team
76	2017-06-17	16.00	Samut Sakhon Futsal Club	6-2	Rajnavy Futsal club
77	2017-06-17	16.00	Pattaya Thai-Tech Futsal Club	5-6	Bangkok City Futsal Club
78	2017-06-17	18.00	Nonthaburi Futsal Club	2-4	BTS Bangkok Futsal Club
79	2017-06-17	18.00	Kasem Bundit Futsal Club	1-8	ThaiPort Futsal Club
80	2017-06-18	16.00	PTT Bluewave Chonburi Futsal Club	7-3	Thakham Cold Storage Futsal Club
81	2017-06-18	18.00	Department of Highways Futsal Club	1-3	Surat Thani Futsal Club
82	2017-06-18	18.00	Nakhon Ratchasima V-One Futsal Club	1-4	Sisaket Futsal Club

Week 13
N.	Date	Time	Home team	Results	Away team
83	2017-06-24	16.00	Sisaket Futsal Club	4-6	Pattaya Thai-Tech Futsal Club
84	2017-06-24	16.00	ThaiPort Futsal Club	6-3	Thakham Cold Storage Futsal Club
85	2017-06-24	18.00	Bangkok City Futsal Club	2-4	Samut Sakhon Futsal Club
86	2017-06-24	18.00	Surat Thani Futsal Club	6-6	Nonthaburi Futsal Club
87	2017-06-25	16.00	Rajnavy Futsal club	6-4	Department of Highways Futsal Club
88	2017-06-25	18.00	BTS Bangkok Futsal Club	3-3	Kasem Bundit Futsal Club
89	2017-06-25	18.00	Nakhon Ratchasima V-One Futsal Club	2-3	PTT Bluewave Chonburi Futsal Club
