= 2017–18 Thai FA Futsal Cup =

AIS Thai FA Futsal Cup

Tournament details
- Country: Thailand
- Dates: 5 October 2017 – 7 January 2018
- Teams: 61

Final positions
- Champions: BTS Bangkok Futsal Club (1st title)
- Runners-up: Department of Highways

Tournament statistics
- Matches played: 46
- Top goal scorer: Peerapat Kaeowilai (7 Goal)

Awards
- Best player: Phiyakart Chanthem

The 2017–18 Thai FA Futsal Cup was the sixth season of Thailand's knockout futsal competition. It was sponsored by Advanced Info Service (AIS), and was known as the AIS FA Futsal Cup (Thai: เอไอเอส เอฟเอฟุตซอลคัพ) for sponsorship purposes. The tournament was organized by the Football Association of Thailand. 61 clubs were accepted into the tournament. It began with a qualification round from 6 October to 17 October 2017, and concluded with the final round from 25 November 2017 to 7 January 2018.

== Calendar ==
Round		Draw match	Team	Date
Qualification round	Preliminary round 1	5 October 2017	61	6-9 October 2017
Qualification round	Preliminary round 2	5 October 2017	61	10-14 October 2017
Qualification round	Play-off round	5 October 2017	61	16-17 October 2017
Main tournament	First round	14 December 2017	32	25-27 November 2017
Main tournament	Round of 16	14 December 2017	16	28-29 November 2017
Main tournament	Quarter-finals	14 December 2017	8	4 January 2018
Main tournament	Semi-finals	14 December 2017	4	6 January 2018
Main tournament	Final	14 December 2017	2	7 January 2018

== Results ==
=== First round ===
25 December 2017	Sarhaparnit futsal club	2 – 5	Breaker Pattaya futsal club	Bangkok
11:00 (UTC+7)	Surachat shinagram 2', 23'	Report	Arnon Orpipat 2', 33', 38'; Thanapon Wongsarart 11', 35'	Stadium: Fashion Island Stadium

25 December 2017	Rajchaphat Changmai futsal club	1 – 7	Northeast University futsal club	Bangkok
13:00 (UTC+7)	Anuwat shenkraw 12'; Nattaphon Singkar 16' (o.g.)	Report	Kirati Thoshatu 9', 30', 40'; Shurakrit Ritmun 31'; Waryut Sribua 33'; Agkraphon Kromkreang 34'	Stadium: Fashion Island Stadium

25 December 2017	Bangphub-don futsal club	9–4	Ferus kon18 futsal club	Bangkok
15:00 (UTC+7)	Vishawon cheheng 16'; Kritshanaphong Auchomwong 17'; Woraphot Putthaishong 18', 20'; Arphichat Nonserppaw 24'; Thanakorn Theangthit 25', 38'; Visharut Maichan 38'; Arnuwat Phanoppha 40'	Report	Narhongsak Leeaum 9' chatdanai sharlee 37'; Suphakorn Thongdung 38'; Arphiwat Mudnarhoo 39'	Stadium: Fashion Island Stadium

25 December 2017	Nakhon pathom futsal club	2–3	KBU futsal club	Bangkok
17:00 (UTC+7)	Natthawut Suankraw 4'; Sorrawit Maisak 39'	Report	Thanaphong ketuket 29', 36'; Phawarit Hronggern 40'	Stadium: Fashion Island Stadium

25 December 2017	Victory city futsal club	2–5	Nakhon chiangkhan futsal club	Bangkok
19:00 (UTC+7)	Khumpon Krinphutsorn 24', 38'	Report	Thanakrit buakraw 19', 30', 37'; Thartre Op-om 28'; Khomson karsee 35'	Stadium: Fashion Island Stadium

26 December 2017	Ratchaburi futsal club	0–8	BTS Bangkok Futsal Club	Bangkok
11:00 (UTC+7)	Nathapon Krinhom 18' (o.g.)	Report	Phunyaphon Phumwiset 12', 19', 20'; Phunya buwkum 22'; Muhammad Osamanmusa 28'; Thanachot Sorsaweang 32'; Arpiwat Phibansing 38'	Stadium: Fashion Island Stadium

26 December 2017	Thakham Cold Storage	1–2	Bangkok City Futsal Club	Bangkok
13:00 (UTC+7)		Report	Pratya Srimuntha 2', 4'; Thanakorn Rerdbunchu 23' (o.g.)	Stadium: Fashion Island Stadium

26 December 2017	Nonthaburi Futsal club	2–0	D-SPORT RMUTP	Bangkok
15:00 (UTC+7)	Teedarnai Yakreaw 9'; Chonrawin Phergyai 17'	Report		Stadium: Fashion Island Stadium

26 December 2017	Muhammadeeyar	3–7	CAT Futsal Club	Bangkok
17:00 (UTC+7)	Suphot Mamin 35' chitnarhong 36'; Thunva Devamard 38'	Report	Pronparshong Boonjoog 1'; Parphat Ausumran 12'; Kunphon Seingshagha 20'; Saharat Inpun 21', 26'; Sharok Hokon 31'; Trakran Termthanasak 33'	Stadium: Fashion Island Stadium

26 December 2017	PTT Bluewave Chonburi	11–2	RKR Futsal Club	Bangkok
19:00 (UTC+7)	Sorasak Phoonjungreed 4'; Pookun Dongdung 7', 32'; Peerapat Kaeowilai 15', 16', 20', 29', 36', 39'; Panat Kittipanuwong 25'; Werasak Srichai 35'	Report	Veerayut Bearchi 9'; Rangsiman channopkunAusumran 10'	Stadium: Fashion Island Stadium

27 December 2017	Sourd&charern	1–1 (3-4 p)	Kasem Bundit Futsal Club	Bangkok
9:00 (UTC+7)	Shomchai Ornyhongseang 24'	Report	Chancha Anver Butt 26'	Stadium: Fashion Island Stadium

27 December 2017	Warrix Praphathom Futsal club	4–8	Pattaya Thai-Tech Futsal Club	Bangkok
11:00 (UTC+7)	Nitiphat phuparditphong 15', 39'; Siriwat Kitchapitak 30'; Kittikorn Shaparpaporn 32'	Report	Nontaphun phortpert 1', 2', 18', 20'; Nukoon Prachit 14'; Anuphong Ritthaphorm 23'; Somchai radchawong 28'; Adisak chansar 32'	Stadium: Fashion Island Stadium

27 December 2017	Department of Highways	3–0	Thai port Futsal Club	Bangkok
13:00 (UTC+7)	Teerapat Artdej 11'; Kawin Viboonradchakit 27'; Jirasin khimseang 40'	Report		Stadium: Fashion Island Stadium

27 December 2017	Samut Sakhon Futsal Club	4–0	Nakhon Ratchasima V-One	Bangkok
15:00 (UTC+7)	Sittichai Prashongsin 14'; Pornthep Phonkreng 17'; Arhongkorn chanporn 27' chakrit Thonneam 34'	Report		Stadium: Fashion Island Stadium

27 December 2017	NAVA 1618	1–9	Rajnavy Futsal Club	Bangkok
17:00 (UTC+7)	Chitphong Montha 9'	Report	Aitticha parphapan 5', 17'; Vipoonsana Peamsawat 12'; Piyanat Nutyar 21'; Jetsada Chudech 22', 22'; Werayut Wongciangrak 23'; Thinakorn Sridej 34'	Stadium: Fashion Island Stadium

27 December 2017	Surat Thani Futsal Club	3–2	Sisaket Futsal Club	Bangkok
19:00 (UTC+7)	Thotsawat Phuathong 11'; Pornthep Sonamith 17'; Numthang Gyhocharernpaisan 35'	Report	Apisak Phandee 6'; Poomsup Wongsapicharn 34'	Stadium: Fashion Island Stadium

=== Round of 16 ===
28 December 2017	Surat Thani Futsal Club	1–2	Rajnavy Futsal Club	Bangkok
11:00 (UTC+7)	Nanthawat raksanatow 3'	Report	Piyanat Nutyar 6'; Werayut Wongciangrak 28'	Stadium: Island Hall Stadium

28 December 2017	Nonthaburi Futsal club	2–1	Bangphub-don futsal club	Bangkok
13:00 (UTC+7)	Visarut Maichan 11'; Wonniwat Kariphop 29'	Report	Thanakorn Theangthit 40'	Stadium: Island Hall Stadium

28 December 2017	Bangkok City Futsal Club	0–6	Samut Sakhon Futsal Club	Bangkok
15:00 (UTC+7)		Report	Sittichai Prashongsin 20', 27', 29'; Rattapon Runrherg 32'; Sittichai chombanpraw 34'; Phudit Towshongkrow 37'	Stadium: Island Hall Stadium

28 December 2017	KBU futsal club	2–2 (2–3 p)	Breaker Pattaya futsal club	Bangkok
17:00 (UTC+7)	Nattawut Shoheng 7', 37'	Report	Thanapon Wongsarart 22'; Arnon Orpipat 30'	Stadium: Island Hall Stadium

29 December 2017	BTS Bangkok Futsal Club	3–1	CAT Futsal club	Bangkok
11:00 (UTC+7)	Muhammad Osamanmusa 26', 38'; Nawin Ratthanawongsawat 36'	Report	Apiwat Changyaow 27'	Stadium: Island Hall Stadium

29 December 2017	Pattaya Thai-Tech Futsal Club	0–3	Department of Highways	Bangkok
13:00 (UTC+7)		Report	Kiatiyod charemket 3'; Artichai Phusawat 25'; Sarawut Pharaperg 34'	Stadium: Island Hall Stadium

29 December 2017	Northeast University futsal club	2–4	Nakhon chiangkhan futsal club	Bangkok
15:00 (UTC+7)	Kittiphong Sonsuvan 20', 37'	Report	Khomson karsee 11'; Thartre Op-om 25', 32'; Nantawut Jeepon 36'	Stadium: Island Hall Stadium

29 December 2017	Kasem Bundit Futsal Club	2–2 (5–4 p)	PTT Bluewave Chonburi	Bangkok
17:00 (UTC+7)	Chancha Anver Butt 12'; Anantachai Prabwongshar 40'	Report	Peerapat Kaeowilai 9'; Tairong Phettieam 40'	Stadium: Island Hall Stadium

=== Quarter-finals ===
4 January 2018	Kasem Bundit Futsal Club	7–2	Nakhon chiangkhan futsal club	Bangkok
12:00 (UTC+7)	Todsaporn O-Thong 11'; Chancha Anver Butt 14'; Burahamuddin Rawmae 16', 20'; Worapat Jiwajaratwong 17', 24'; Sahashup Thaweesuk 20'	Report	Thanakrit buaphan 35'; Nantawut Jeephon 36'	Stadium: Island Hall Stadium

4 January 2018	BTS Bangkok Futsal Club	3–3 (3–1 p)	Nonthaburi Futsal club	Bangkok
14:00 (UTC+7)	Nantikorn Namkam 6' Muhammad Osamanmusa 23'; Saharat Sriwongkot 37'	Report	Chonrawin Phergyai 7'; Teedarnai Yakreaw 38'; Wonniwat Kariphop 40'	Stadium: Island Hall Stadium

4 January 2018	Department of Highways	6–0	Breaker Pattaya futsal club	Bangkok
16:00 (UTC+7)	Kiatiyod charemket 4', 11'; Artiraj Sittisak 9'; Phassakorn Sakonvaree 24'; Attichai Phusawang 26'; Natee Tusiri 35'	Report		Stadium: Island Hall Stadium

4 January 2018	Samut Sakhon Futsal Club	1–1 (2–0 p)	Rajnavy Futsal Club	Bangkok
18:00 (UTC+7)	Sittichai Chombanpraw 26'	Report	Nattawut Namchan 20'	Stadium: Island Hall Stadium

=== Semi-finals ===
6 January 2018	Kasem Bundit Futsal Club	3–3 (1–3 p)	Department of Highways	Bangkok
14:00 (UTC+7)	Todsaporn O-Thong 10'; Anantachai Prabwongshar 20' (pen.), 36'	Report	Kiatiyod charemket 4', 18' (pen.); Natee Tusiri 36'	Stadium: Island Hall Stadium

6 January 2018	BTS Bangkok Futsal Club	1–0	Samut Sakhon Futsal Club	Bangkok
16:00 (UTC+7)	Phanya Arunphuvanat 37' (pen.)	Report		Stadium: Island Hall Stadium

=== Final ===
7 January 2018	Department of Highways	1–1 (8–9 p)	BTS Bangkok Futsal Club	Bangkok
14:00 (UTC+7)	Jeerasil Kimseang 9'	Report	Nawin Rattanawongsawat 47'	Stadium: Island Hall Stadium
	Penalties
	Kiattiyod Charemket (penalty scored); Padsakorn Sakhonwaree (penalty scored); Chanathip Jitviboon (penalty scored); Artichai Phusawat (penalty scored); Surasit Arunruak (penalty scored); Jeerasil Kimseang (penalty scored); Narit Srihawong (penalty scored); Artirat Sitisak (penalty missed)		(penalty scored) Phanya Aranphuvanat; (penalty scored) Teerawat Gramrit; (penalty scored) Nawin Rattanawongsawat; (penalty scored) Muhammad Osamanmusa; (penalty scored) Artiwat Phibarnsing; (penalty scored) anuwat sarket (penalty scored) Thanachot Sorsarveang; (penalty scored) Nunthakorn NarmKarm

== Awards ==
Awards	Team	Player	Prize money	REF.
(gold) Winner	BTS Bangkok Futsal Club	-	700,000 Baht	
(silver) Runner-up	Department of Highways	-	300,000 Baht	
Most Valuable Player	Department of Highways	Phiyakart Chanthem	20,000 Baht	
Top scorer	PTT Bluewave Chonburi	Peerapat Kaeowilai	20,000 Baht	
