= 2018 Futsal Thailand League =

Futsal Thailand League
- Season: 2018

The 2018 Futsal Thai League (also known as AIS Futsal Thai League for sponsorship reasons) was a top-tier professional futsal league under the Football Association of Thailand (FAT) and Advanced Info Service (AIS) It was the tenth edition of the league, with a total of 14 teams. The league began in April 2018 and finished in December 2018.

== Teams ==
Promoted teams

CAT Telecom Futsal Club and Northeastern University Futsal Club were promoted from the 2017 Thai Championship Futsal League by finishing in the first and second place, respectively.

Relegated teams

Nonthaburi Futsal Club and Nakhon Ratchasima V-One Futsal Club were relegated from the 2018 Thai Championship Futsal League by finishing in the last 2 places of the league.

Renamed teams

Loso-D Thai Tech was renamed to Sripathum GSB Thai-Tech and relocated from Chonburi Province to Bangkok.

Home Stadium
Team	Province	Home stadium	Capacity
Bangkok BTS Futsal Club	Bangkok	72nd Anniversary Gymnasium Meenburi	2,000
Bangkok City Futsal Club	Bangkok	Keelavesana 1 Gymnasium	2,000
CAT Telecom Futsal Club	Bangkok	North Bangkok University Saphan Mai Campus	500
Highway Department Futsal Club	Nonthaburi Province	Plaibang Municipality Gymnasium	500
Kasem Bundit University Futsal Club	Bangkok	12th floor Kasem Bundit University Romklao Campus Gymnasium	500
Northeastern University	Khon Kaen Province	Northeastern University Gymnasium	1,500
Port Futsal Club	Bangkok	Port Authority of Thailand Futsal Pitch	500
PTT Bluewave Chonburi Futsal Club	Chonburi Province	Institution of Physical and Education Chonburi Campus Multi-purposed Gymnasium	3,000
Royal Thai Navy Futsal Club	Samut Prakan Province	Bhuti-anan Gymnasium	500
Samut Sakhon Futsal Club		Samut Sakhon Wutthichai School Gymnasium	500
Sisaket Futsal Club	Sisaket Province	Siriwanwalee Building, Sisaket Rajabhat University	1,000
Sripathum GSB Thai Tech Futsal Club	Bangkok	12th floor Sripathum University Bang Khen Campus Gymnasium	500
Surat Thani Futsal Club	Surat Thani Province	Chang Tapee Arena	4,000
Takham Cold Storage Futsal Club	Samut Sakhon	Takham Cold Storage Sanamchai	

Former players
Team	Player 1	Player 2	Former player
Bangkok BTS Futsal Club			
Bangkok City Futsal Club	(Brazil) Francisco Jackson	(Brazil) Raimundo Helio Carneiro Neto	
CAT Telecom Futsal Club	(Brazil) Bruno Facanha	(Japan) Yudai Iwasaki	
Highway Department Futsal Club	(Brazil) Romualdo da Silva		
Kasem Bundit University Futsal Club			
Northeastern University Futsal Club			
Port Futsal Club	(Brazil) Marcos Vinicius	(Brazil) Rian Feitose Gomes	
PTT Bluewave Chonburi Futsal Club	(Brazil) Rudimar Venancio	(Brazil) Andre Thiago Grahl	
Royal Thai Navy Futsal Club	(Japan) Yuta Tokutake		
Samut Sakhon Futsal Club			
Sisaket Futsal Club	(Brazil) Cuart da Cruz Cristiano	(Brazil) Ramon Pavao	
Sripathum GSB Thai-Tech Futsal Club			
Surat Thani Futsal Club	(Brazil) Rosencler de Carvalho Junior	(Brazil) Felipe Costa Santos	
Thakham Cold Storage Futsal Club	(Brazil) Jacinilson Texeira Viana Braga	(Brazil) Wendel da Silva Mendes	
