= 2016 Futsal Thailand League =

Futsal Thailand League
- Season: 2016
- Matches: 97
- Goals: 668 (6.89 per match)
- Biggest home win: Bangkok City 11–1 Nonthaburi (4 June 2016); Chonburi Blue Wave 11–1 NEU. - Khon Kaen (7 August 2016)
- Biggest away win: NEU. - Khon Kaen 1–12 Nakhon Ratchasima V-One (11 June 2016)
- Highest scoring: NEU. - Khon Kaen 6–10 Department of Highways (29 May 2016)

The 2016 Futsal Thailand League (also known as the AIS Futsal Thailand League for sponsorship reasons) is the top-tier professional Futsal league under Football Association of Thailand (FAT) and Advanced Info Service (AIS)'s control. This is the eighth season of the league, the top Thai professional Futsal league. A total of 14 teams are competing in the league. The season is going to begin in May 2016.

Chonburi Blue Wave are the defending champions, having won the league title the previous season.

Following the death of King Bhumibol Adulyadej, the Football Association of Thailand ended the league after week 15. Chonburi Blue Wave who was the leader at that time was awarded as the champion.

== Teams ==
A total of 14 teams is going to take place the league.

Promoted teams

Kasem Bandit and Department of Highways were two teams that promoted from 2015 Thailand Division 1 Futsal League.

Renamed teams

Phuket United renamed to Bangkok City.

Sri Pathum - Sisaket renamed to Thai-Tech.

Team	Province	Stadium	Capacity
Chonburi Blue Wave	Chonburi	Chonburi Municipality Gymnasium	3,000
Port Futsal Club	Bangkok	Port Authority of Thailand Futsal Pitch	200
Bangkok City	Bangkok	Thai-Japanese Youth Centre Hall 1	1,500
Nakhon Ratchasima V-One	Nakhon Ratchasima	Korat Chatchai Hall	5,000
Surat Thani	Surat Thani	Chang Tapee Arena	4,500
LOSO-D Thai-Tech	Bangkok	Sripatum University Gymnasium	500
Nonthaburi	Nonthaburi	Durakij Pundit University Gymnasium	500
Department of Highways	Bangkok	Plaibang Municipality Gymnasium	200
Bangkok BTS	Bangkok	His Majesty the King's 72nd Birthday Anniversary Gymnasium	2,000
Samut Sakhon	Samut Sakhon	Samut Sakhon Wutthichai School Gymnasium	500
Rajnavy	Samut Prakan	Bhuti-anan Gymnasium	100
CAT	Bangkok	North Bangkok University Gymnasium Saphan Mai Campus	500
Kasem Bundit	Bangkok	12th floor Kasem Bundit University Gymnasium Romklao Campus	500
North Eastern University - Khon Kaen	Khon Kaen	North Eastern University Gymnasium	1,000

== League table ==
Pos	Team	Pld	W	D	L	GF	GA	GD	Pts	Qualification or relegation
1	Chonburi Blue Wave	15	14	0	1	87	27	+60	42	2017 AFC Futsal Club Championship Group stage
2	Port	15	12	1	2	62	28	+34	37	
3	Bangkok	15	10	2	3	69	42	+27	32	
4	Bangkok City	15	8	4	3	69	58	+11	28	
5	Rajnavy	15	8	3	4	57	46	+11	27	
6	Surat Thani	15	7	3	5	53	41	+12	24	
7	Department of Highways	15	6	3	6	60	62	−2	21	
8	Kasem Bundit University	15	5	3	7	36	48	−12	18	
9	Thai-Tech	15	5	2	8	43	60	−17	17	
10	Samut Sakhon	15	2	7	6	34	42	−8	13	
11	Nakhon Ratchasima	15	3	3	9	53	73	−20	12	
12	CAT	15	2	4	9	37	54	−17	10	
13	Nonthaburi	15	2	4	9	36	65	−29	10	Relegation to the 2017 Futsal Thailand League Division 1
14	North Eastern University-Khon Kaen	15	2	0	13	37	94	−57	6	Relegation to the 2017 Futsal Thailand League Division 1

Updated to match(es) played on 10 October 2016. Source: Futsal Thailand League
Rules for classification: 1) points; 2) goal difference; 3) number of goals scored.

== Results ==
Results of the 2016 Futsal Thailand League.

Week 1

Date	Time	Home team	Results	Away team
14/05/16	16.15	Bangkok BTS	6-3	Samut Sakhon
14/05/16	18.15	Kasem Bundit University	1-0	Nonthaburi
14/05/16	18.15	Department of Highways	6-5	Surat Thani
15/05/16	16.15	Chonburi Blue Wave	7-1	CAT
15/05/16	18.15	Bangkok City	8-7	Nakhon Ratchasima V-One
15/05/16	18.15	LOSO-D Thai-Tech	1-6	Rajnavy
16/05/16	21.15	Port Futsal Club	3-0	North Eastern University - Khon Kaen

Week 2

Date	Time	Home team	Results	Away team
20/05/16	16.15	Nakhon Ratchasima V-One	5-8	LOSO-D Thai-Tech
21/05/16	16.15	Samut Sakhon	2-3	Port Futsal Club
21/05/16	18.15	Surat Thani	2-2	Kasem Bundit University
21/05/16	18.15	North Eastern University - Khon Kaen	3-5	Bangkok City
22/05/16	16.15	Rajnavy	3-2	Department of Highways
22/05/16	18.15	CAT	1-1	Bangkok BTS
22/05/16	18.15	Nonthaburi	3-4	Chonburi Blue Wave

Week 3

Date	Time	Home team	Results	Away team
25/05/16	16.05	Rajnavy	4-3	Surat Thani
25/05/16	18.15	Department of Highways	4-2	Nakhon Ratchasima V-One
25/05/16	18.15	LOSO-D Thai-Tech	5-2	North Eastern University - Khon Kaen
25/05/16	18.15	Port Futsal Club	7-2	CAT
25/05/16	20.15	Chonburi Blue Wave	5-1	Kasem Bundit University
25/05/16	20.15	Bangkok BTS	9-2	Nonthaburi
25/05/16	20.15	Bangkok City	3-3	Samut Sakhon

Week 4

Date	Time	Home team	Results	Away team
28/05/16	16.15	CAT	4-4	Bangkok City
28/05/16	18.15	Samut Sakhon	0-0	LOSO-D Thai-Tech
28/05/16	18.15	Nakhon Ratchasima V-One	2-2	Rajnavy
29/05/16	16.05	Surat Thani	2-5	Chonburi Blue Wave
29/05/16	18.05	Nonthaburi	2-5	Port Futsal Club
29/05/16	18.05	North Eastern University - Khon Kaen	6-10	Department of Highways
30/05/16	21.30	Kasem Bundit University	5-7	Bangkok BTS

Week 5

Date	Time	Home team	Results	Away team
04/06/16	16.05	Bangkok City	11-1	Nonthaburi
04/06/16	18.15	LOSO-D Thai-Tech	4-3	CAT
04/06/16	18.15	Rajnavy	8-3	North Eastern University - Khon Kaen
05/06/16	18.15	Nakhon Ratchasima V-One	4-2	Surat Thani
05/06/16	18.15	Port Futsal Club	4-1	Kasem Bundit University
06/06/16	14.05	Department of Highways	4-4	Samut Sakhon
06/06/16	21.30	Bangkok BTS	1-3	Chonburi Blue Wave

Week 6

Date	Time	Home team	Results	Away team
11/06/16	16.05	North Eastern University - Khon Kaen	1-12	Nakhon Ratchasima V-One
11/06/16	18.15	CAT	3-6	Department of Highways
11/06/16	18.15	Samut Sakhon	5-5	Rajnavy
12/06/16	16.05	Surat Thani	2-0	Bangkok BTS
12/06/16	18.15	Kasem Bundit University	2-5	Bangkok City
12/06/16	18.05	Nonthaburi	3-3	LOSO-D Thai-Tech
13/06/16	21.30	Chonburi Blue Wave	5-3	Port Futsal Club

Week 7

Date	Time	Home team	Results	Away team
17/06/16	16.05	Rajnavy	2-1	CAT
18/06/16	16.05	Port Futsal Club	6-2	Bangkok BTS
18/06/16	18.15	LOSO-D Thai-Tech	7-0	Kasem Bundit University
18/06/16	18.15	Nakhon Ratchasima V-One	2-2	Samut Sakhon
19/06/16	16.05	Bangkok City	5-4	Chonburi Blue Wave
19/06/16	18.15	Department of Highways	5-4	Nonthaburi
19/06/16	18.15	North Eastern University - Khon Kaen	3-7	Surat Thani

Week 8

Date	Time	Home team	Results	Away team
22/06/16	16.05	Bangkok BTS	8-4	Bangkok City
22/06/16	18.15	Surat Thani	3-1	Port Futsal Club
22/06/16	18.15	Samut Sakhon	5-2	North Eastern University - Khon Kaen
22/06/16	18.15	CAT	3-4	Nakhon Ratchasima V-One
22/06/16	20.15	Kasem Bundit University	5-3	Department of Highways
22/06/16	20.15	Chonburi Blue Wave	9-2	LOSO-D Thai-Tech
22/06/16	20.15	Nonthaburi	2-6	Rajnavy

Week 9

Date	Time	Home team	Results	Away team
25/06/16	16.05	Samut Sakhon	0-2	Surat Thani
25/06/16	18.15	North Eastern University - Khon Kaen	3-5	CAT
25/06/16	18.15	LOSO-D Thai-Tech	1-4	Bangkok BTS
26/06/16	16.05	Department of Highways	0-5	Chonburi Blue Wave
26/06/16	18.15	Nakhon Ratchasima V-One	2-4	Nonthaburi
26/06/16	18.15	Rajnavy	4-1	Kasem Bundit University
27/06/16	21.30	Bangkok City	3-4	Port Futsal Club

Week 10

Date	Time	Home team	Results	Away team
30/06/16	16.05	Chonburi Blue Wave	8-3	Rajnavy
30/06/16	18.15	CAT	2-4	Samut Sakhon
30/06/16	18.15	Bangkok BTS	5-3	Department of Highways
30/06/16	18.15	Surat Thani	1-1	Bangkok City
30/06/16	20.15	Port Futsal Club	4-0	LOSO-D Thai-Tech
30/06/16	20.15	Nonthaburi	4-5	North Eastern University - Khon Kaen
30/06/16	20.15	Kasem Bundit University	8-3	Nakhon Ratchasima V-One

Week 11

Date	Time	Home team	Results	Away team
30/07/16	16.05	Department of Highways	2-2	Port Futsal Club
30/07/16	18.15	LOSO-D Thai-Tech	3-5	Bangkok City
30/07/16	18.15	Samut Sakhon	1-1	Nonthaburi
31/07/16	16.05	Rajnavy	1-3	Bangkok BTS
31/07/16	18.15	North Eastern University - Khon Kaen	3-2	Kasem Bundit University
31/07/16	18.15	CAT	5-2	Surat Thani
01/08/16	21.30	Nakhon Ratchasima V-One	0-7	Chonburi Blue Wave

Week 12

Date	Time	Home team	Results	Away team
03/08/16	16.05	Bangkok City	4-5	Rajnavy
03/08/16	18.15	Kasem Bundit University	1-1	CAT
03/08/16	18.15	Bangkok BTS	7-1	North Eastern University - Khon Kaen
03/08/16	18.15	Nonthaburi	2-6	Surat Thani
03/08/16	18.15	Chonburi Blue Wave	6-3	Samut Sakhon
04/08/16	16.05	Port Futsal Club	9-1	Nakhon Ratchasima V-One

Week 13

Date	Time	Home team	Results	Away team
06/08/16	16.05	Surat Thani	7-1	LOSO-D Thai-Tech
06/08/16	18.15	Bangkok City	6-3	Department of Highways
06/08/16	18.15	Nonthaburi	3-2	CAT
07/08/16	18.15	Chonburi Blue Wave	11-1	North Eastern University - Khon Kaen
07/08/16	18.15	Bangkok BTS	4-1	Nakhon Ratchasima V-One
08/08/16	18.15	Kasem Bundit University	2-1	Samut Sakhon
08/08/16	21.30	Port Futsal Club	2-1	Rajnavy
25/09/16	18.15	LOSO-D Thai-Tech	1-4	Department of Highways

Week 14

Date	Time	Home team	Results	Away team
01/10/16	16.05	Rajnavy	4-4	Bangkok City
01/10/16	18.15	Surat Thani	3-3	Nonthaburi
01/10/16	18.15	Department of Highways	2-3	LOSO-D Thai-Tech
02/10/16	16.05	Samut Sakhon	0-3	Chonburi Blue Wave
02/10/16	18.15	CAT	2-4	Kasem Bundit University]
02/10/16	18.15	North Eastern University - Khon Kaen	2-5	Bangkok BTS
03/10/16	21.30	Nakhon Ratchasima V-One	1-4	Port Futsal Club

Week 15

Date	Time	Home team	Results	Away team
08/10/16	16.05	Thai-Tech	4-6	Surat Thani
08/10/16	18.15	Nakhon Ratchasima V-One	7-7	Bangkok BTS
08/10/16	18.15	CAT	2-2	Nonthaburi
09/10/16	16.05	Department of Highways	6-8	Bangkok City
09/10/16	18.15	Samut Sakhon	1-1	Kasem Bundit University
09/10/16	18.15	North Eastern University - Khon Kaen	2-5	Chonburi Blue Wave
10/10/16	21.30	Rajnavy	3-5	Port Futsal Club
