= 2010 AFC Futsal Club Championship =

Tournament details
- Host country: Iran
- City: Isfahan
- Dates: March 4–12
- Teams: 9
- Venue: 1 (in 1 host city)

Final positions
- Champions: (Iran) Foolad Mahan (1st title)
- Runners-up: (Qatar) Al-Sadd
- Third place: (Japan) Nagoya Oceans
- Fourth place: (Thailand) Thai Port

Tournament statistics
- Matches played: 20
- Goals scored: 203 (10.15 per match)
- Attendance: 24,975 (1,249 per match)
- Top scorer: (Iran) Vahid Shamsaei (17)
- Best player: (Iran) Vahid Shamsaei

The 2010 AFC Futsal Club Championship was the 1st AFC Futsal Club Championship. It was held in Isfahan, Iran between March 4 and March 12, 2010. the event was scheduled to take place between July 4–12, 2009, but had to be postponed due to the political situation in Iran at the time.

== Qualified teams ==
Team	Qualified as
(Australia) New South Wales Thunder	FFA National Championships 2009 Winner
(China) Wuhan Dilong	Chinese League 2008–09 Winner
(Iran) Foolad Mahan Sepahan Isfahan	Iranian Super League 2008–09 Winner
(Iraq) Nawrouz	Iraqi Premier League 2008–09 Winner
(Japan) Nagoya Oceans	F. League 2008–09 Winner
(Kyrgyzstan) AUB-Altyn-Tash Bishkek	Kyrgyzstan League 2008–09 Winner
(Lebanon) Pro's Cafe Beirut	Lebanon Futsal League 2008–09 Winner
(Qatar) Al-Sadd	Qatar League 2008–09 Winner
(Thailand) Thai Port	Thailand League 2007–08 Winner
(Uzbekistan) Stroitel Zarafshan	Uzbek Premiere League 2008–09 Winner

== Venue ==
Isfahan
Pirouzi Arena
Capacity: 4,300

== Group stage ==
=== Group A ===
Team	Pld	W	D	L	GF	GA	GD	Pts
(Iran) Foolad Mahan	3	3	0	0	26	4	+22	9
(Japan) Nagoya Oceans	3	2	0	1	15	11	+4	6
(Kyrgyzstan) AUB-Altyn-Tash	3	1	0	2	9	20	−11	3
(Uzbekistan) Stroitel Zarafshan	3	0	0	3	7	22	−15	0
(Iraq) Nawrouz	0	0	0	0	0	0	0	0

Nawrouz suspended from the competition following the FIFA's ban of the Iraqi Football Association.

March 4
16:30

Stroitel Zarafshan (Uzbekistan)	2 – 5	(Japan) Nagoya Oceans
Khalmukhamedov 29'; Mamedov 36'	Report	Kogure 5'; Hatakeyama 7', 24'; Maruyama 28', 28'

Pirouzi Arena, Isfahan
Attendance: 200
Referee: Mohammad Al-Haddad (Kuwait)

March 5
19:00

AUB-Altyn-Tash (Kyrgyzstan)	1 – 8	(Iran) Foolad Mahan
Etienne 4'	Report	Asghari Moghaddam 9', 31'; Shamsaei 18' (pen.), 20', 34', 40'; Mendibaev 20' (o.g.); Raeisi 30'

Pirouzi Arena, Isfahan
Attendance: 4,300
Referee: Mei Ling (China)

March 6
14:00

Nagoya Oceans (Japan)	8 – 3	(Kyrgyzstan) AUB-Altyn-Tash
Sakai 7'; Morioka 12', 30', 37'; Kitahara 13'; Hatakeyama 15', 32'; Hirabayashi 32'	Report	Kadyrov 4'; Ryskulov 23'; Mendibaev 33'

Pirouzi Arena, Isfahan
Attendance: 35
Referee: Scott Kidson (Australia)

March 8
19:00

Stroitel Zarafshan (Uzbekistan)	1 – 12	(Iran) Foolad Mahan
Mamedov 25'	Report	Shamsaei 3', 9', 15', 23', 35', 38'; Asghari Moghaddam 4'; Taheri 8'; Hassanzadeh 15'; Raeisi 18'; Ghasemi 28'; Baghbanbashi 31'

Pirouzi Arena, Isfahan
Attendance: 4,250
Referee: Prasert Krutsri (Thailand)

March 9
16:30

AUB-Altyn-Tash (Kyrgyzstan)	5 – 4	(Uzbekistan) Stroitel Zarafshan
Geraldo 19', 37'; Kadyrov 24'; Etienne 30'; Tabaldiev 40'	Report	Zakirov 16', 17', 35'; Shapovalov 20'

Pirouzi Arena, Isfahan
Attendance: 470
Referee: Rey Ritaga (Philippines)

March 9
19:00

Foolad Mahan (Iran)	6 – 2	(Japan) Nagoya Oceans
Taheri 8'; Shamsaei 16', 39'; Asghari Moghaddam 28'; Ghasemi 29'; Raeisi 39'	Report	Hirabayashi 9'; Kitahara 13'

Pirouzi Arena, Isfahan
Attendance: 4,300
Referee: Scott Kidson (Australia)

=== Group B ===
Team	Pld	W	D	L	GF	GA	GD	Pts
(Qatar) Al-Sadd	4	3	0	1	31	22	+9	9
(Thailand) Thai Port	4	2	1	1	20	19	+1	7
(Lebanon) Pro's Cafe	4	2	1	1	19	18	+1	7
(China) Wuhan Dilong	4	2	0	2	23	22	+1	6
(Australia) NSW Thunder	4	0	0	4	15	27	−12	0

March 4
11:30

Al-Sadd (Qatar)	8 – 6	(Lebanon) Pro's Cafe
Kamyab 6', 25'; Rodriguinho 26', 31', 37'; Eisa 28'; Mohssein 29'; Errahmouni 30'	Report	Takaji 7', 19', 28'; Kawsan 8'; Itani 36'; El Homsi 39'

Pirouzi Arena, Isfahan
Attendance: 127
Referee: Nurdin Bukuev (Kyrgyzstan)

March 4
14:00

NSW Thunder (Australia)	3 – 4	(China) Wuhan Dilong
Zeballos 29', 38'; Vizzari 40'	Report	Li Xin 19'; Liang Shuang 24'; Wang Wei 39'; Hu Jie 40'

Pirouzi Arena, Isfahan
Attendance: 79
Referee: Husein Khalaileh (Jordan)

March 5
11:30

Al-Sadd (Qatar)	11 – 3	(Australia) NSW Thunder
Kamyab 5', 17', 33', 40'; Errahmouni 8', 19'; Rodriguinho 10', 35'; Eisa 20', 38'; E. Mohammed 40'	Report	Zeballos 19'; Alpkaya 23', 26'

Pirouzi Arena, Isfahan
Attendance: 49
Referee: Yasukazu Nobumoto (Japan)

March 5
14:00

Pro's Cafe (Lebanon)	3 – 3	(Thailand) Thai Port
Takaji 9', 39'; El Homsi 14'	Report	Madyalan 1', 11'; Eamchalard 39'

Pirouzi Arena, Isfahan
Attendance: 100
Referee: Rey Ritaga (Philippines)

March 6
11:30

Wuhan Dilong (China)	3 – 4	(Lebanon) Pro's Cafe
Hu Jie 5', 37'; Yan Fei 9'	Report	Itani 11', 33'; Takaji 38', 39'

Pirouzi Arena, Isfahan
Attendance: 65
Referee: Alireza Sohrabi (Iran)

March 6
16:30

Thai Port (Thailand)	2 – 6	(Qatar) Al-Sadd
Madyalan 10'; Santanaprasit 39'	Report	Kamyab 9', 12', 27'; Mohssein 15'; Rodriguinho 37'; Errahmouni 38'

Pirouzi Arena, Isfahan
Attendance: 50
Referee: Kazuya Isokawa (Japan)

March 8
11:30

Wuhan Dilong (China)	11 – 6	(Qatar) Al-Sadd
Liang Shuang 5'; Li Xin 9', 13', 30'; Hu Jie 10'; Errahmouni 26' (o.g.); Zhang Xi 21', 29', 35'; Yan Fei 27'; Wang Wei 28'	Report	Kamyab 7', 28', 32', 32'; Eisa 20'; Rodriguinho 28'

Pirouzi Arena, Isfahan
Attendance: 49
Referee: Kim Jang-Kwan (South Korea)

March 8
14:00

NSW Thunder (Australia)	5 – 6	(Thailand) Thai Port
Alpkaya 3', 23'; Lockhart 4'; Wetney 12'; Spathis 38'	Report	Taengtung 2', 29', 39'; Alpkaya 3' (o.g.); Madyalan 22'; Santanaprasit 35'

Pirouzi Arena, Isfahan
Attendance: 80
Referee: Vahid Arzpeima (Iran)

March 9
11:30

Pro's Cafe (Lebanon)	6 – 4	(Australia) NSW Thunder
Abu Chaaya 7', 22'; Itani 17'; Takaji 23', 38'; Kawsan 39'	Report	Wetney 22'; Alpkaya 31'; Martinez 38'; Lockhart 39'

Pirouzi Arena, Isfahan
Attendance: 18
Referee: Kazuya Isokawa (Japan)

March 9
14:00

Thai Port (Thailand)	9 – 5	(China) Wuhan Dilong
Taengtung 8'; Rossanakarn 11', 20', 35', 39'; Tintawee 12'; Madyalan 33', 40', 40'	Report	Zhang Xi 7', 23'; Wang Wei 22', 38'; Hu Jie 35'

Pirouzi Arena, Isfahan
Attendance: 60
Referee: Vahid Arzpeima (Iran)

== Knockout stage ==
Semi-finals
March 11 – Isfahan
(Iran) Foolad Mahan	5
(Thailand) Thai Port	3
March 11 – Isfahan
(Qatar) Al-Sadd	7
(Japan) Nagoya Oceans	4

Final
March 12 – Isfahan
(Iran) Foolad Mahan	5
(Qatar) Al-Sadd	2
Third place
March 12 – Isfahan
(Thailand) Thai Port	6 (5)
(Japan) Nagoya Oceans (pen.)	6 (6)

=== Semi-finals ===
March 11
16:30

Foolad Mahan (Iran)	5 – 3	(Thailand) Thai Port
Shamsaei 3', 5', 21'; Hashemzadeh 22'; Hassanzadeh 23'	Report	Keshavarz 1' (o.g.); Ghasemi 20' (o.g.); Romanee 21'

Pirouzi Arena, Isfahan
Attendance: 2,150
Referee: Mohammad Al-Haddad (Kuwait)

March 11
19:00

Al-Sadd (Qatar)	7 – 4	(Japan) Nagoya Oceans
Errahmouni 8'; Rodriguinho 21', 40'; Kamyab 24', 37'; Mohssein 35'; Ciz 39'	Report	Maeda 26'; Kogure 29', 39'; Kitahara 30'

Pirouzi Arena, Isfahan
Attendance: 893
Referee: Nurdin Bukuev (Kyrgyzstan)

=== Third place play-off ===
March 12
16:30

Thai Port (Thailand)	6 – 6 (a.e.t.)	(Japan) Nagoya Oceans
Rossanakarn 12', 13'; Taengtung 19', 50'; Madyalan 32'; Dankhunthod 46'	Report	Sakai 5', 11'; Mori 10'; Morioka 15'; Kogure 47'; Santanaprasit 50' (o.g.)
Penalties
	5 – 6

Pirouzi Arena, Isfahan
Attendance: 4,300
Referee: Alireza Sohrabi (Iran)

=== Final ===
March 12
19:00

Foolad Mahan (Iran)	5 – 2	(Qatar) Al-Sadd
Shamsaei 2', 39'; Taheri 8'; Asghari Moghaddam 37', 38'	Report	Errahmouni 13', 24'

Pirouzi Arena, Isfahan
Attendance: 3,400
Referee: Kim Jang-Kwan (South Korea)

== Awards ==
AFC Futsal Club Championship
2010 Champions

Foolad Mahan Sepahan Isfahan
First Title

- Most Valuable Player
  - (Iran) Vahid Shamsaei
- Top Scorer
  - (Iran) Vahid Shamsaei (17 goals)
- Fair-Play Award
  - (Iran) Foolad Mahan

== Final standing ==
Rank	Team
1st place, gold medalist(s)	(Iran) Foolad Mahan Sepahan Isfahan
2nd place, silver medalist(s)	(Qatar) Al-Sadd
3rd place, bronze medalist(s)	(Japan) Nagoya Oceans
4	(Thailand) Thai Port
5	(Lebanon) Pro's Cafe Beirut
6	(China) Wuhan Dilong
7	(Kyrgyzstan) AUB-Altyn-Tash Bishkek
8	(Uzbekistan) Stroitel Zarafshan
9	(Australia) New South Wales Thunder

== Top scorers ==
Rank	Player	Club	Goals
1	(Iran) Vahid Shamsaei	(Iran) Foolad Mahan	17
2	(Iran) Zahir Kamyab	(Qatar) Al-Sadd	15
3	(Qatar) Rodriguinho	(Qatar) Al-Sadd	9
3	(Lebanon) Khaled Takaji	(Lebanon) Pro's Cafe	9
5	(Thailand) Nattawut Madyalan	(Thailand) Thai Port	8
6	(Belgium) Bilal Errahmouni	(Qatar) Al-Sadd	7
7	(Iran) Javad Asghari Moghaddam	(Iran) Foolad Mahan	6
7	(Thailand) Ulid Rossanakarn	(Thailand) Thai Port	6
7	(Thailand) Ukrit Taengtung	(Thailand) Thai Port	6
10	(Australia) Ediz Alpkaya	(Australia) NSW Thunder	5
10	(China) Hu Jie	(China) Wuhan Dilong	5
10	(China) Zhang Xi	(China) Wuhan Dilong	5
13	(Qatar) Mohammed Eisa	(Qatar) Al-Sadd	4
13	(Japan) Takashi Hatakeyama	(Japan) Nagoya Oceans	4
13	(Japan) Kenichiro Kogure	(Japan) Nagoya Oceans	4
13	(Japan) Kaoru Morioka	(Japan) Nagoya Oceans	4
13	(Lebanon) Mahmoud Itani	(Lebanon) Pro's Cafe	4
13	(China) Li Xin	(China) Wuhan Dilong	4
13	(China) Wang Wei	(China) Wuhan Dilong	4
