= Real United =

Thai sports equipment company

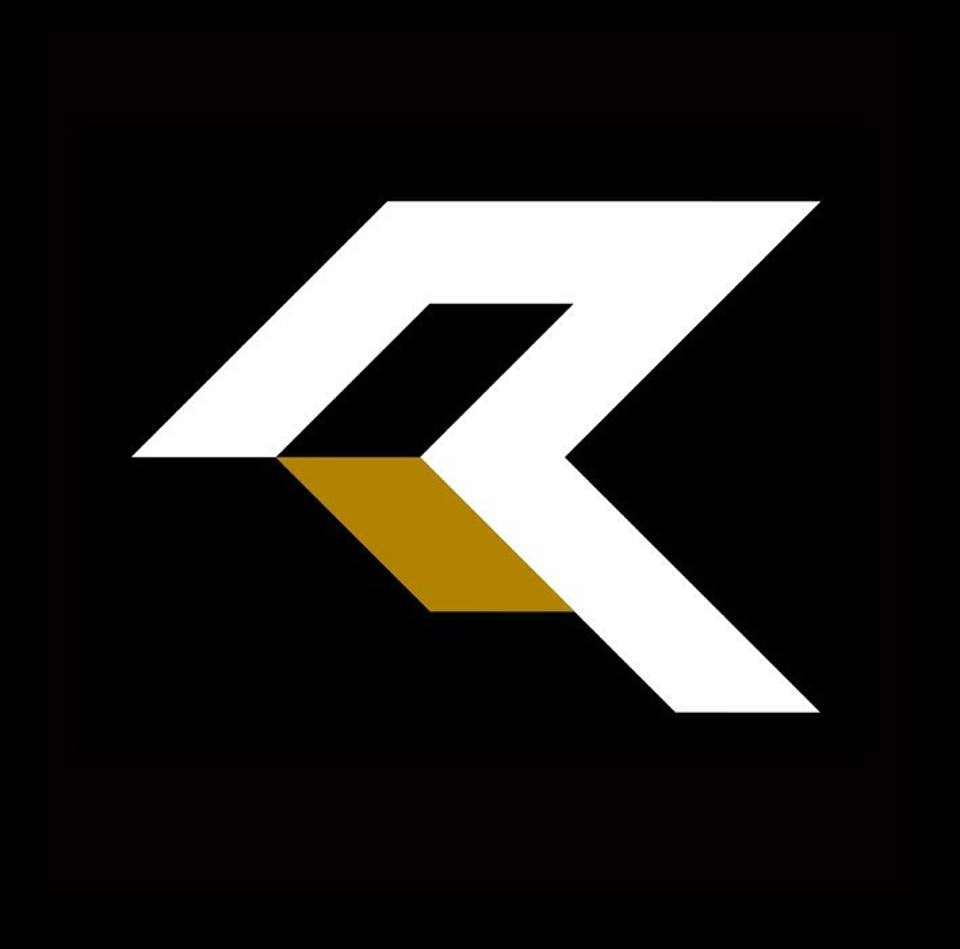
- Company type: Limited
- Industry: Sportswear; Sports equipment
- Founder: 2014
- Headquarters: Samut Sakhon, Thailand
- Area served: Thailand
- Products: Athletic shoes Apparel; Sports equipment

Real United or also known as Real is a Thai sports equipment company.

== Sponsorships ==
=== Football/Futsal ===
==== Club Teams ====
- Chonburi Blue Wave Futsal Club
- Rajnavy Futsal Club
- Surat Thani Futsal Club
- Lanexang United F.C.
- Nonthaburi F.C.

==== Presenter ====
- Panat Kittipanuwong Thailand national futsal Player
- Tairong Petchtiam Thailand national futsal Player
