= Muhammad Osamanmusa =

Thai futsal player

Personal information
- Date of birth: 19 January 1998 (age 28)
- Place of birth: Bangkok, Thailand
- Height: 1.78 m (5 ft 10 in)
- Position: Pivot

Team information
- Current team: Jimbee Cartagena
- Number: 20

Youth career
- 2010–2012: Wat Benchamabophit School
- 2013–2015: Rajavinit Bangkhen School

Senior career*
Years	Team	Apps	(Gls)
2016–2020	Bangkok BTS	34	(29)
2017	→ Santiago Futsal (loan)	1	(1)
2019	→ Port Futsal (loan)	3	(6)
2020–2022	Chonburi Bluewave	24	(30)
2022–2024	Black Pearl United	9	(5)
2022–2023	→ Córdoba Futsal (loan)	5	(1)
2023–2024	→ Córdoba Futsal (loan)	27	(13)
2024–	Jimbee Cartagena	47	(13)

International career
2017–2018	Thailand Futsal U20	8	(9)
2017–	Thailand Futsal	101	(110)
Medal record
Thailand national futsal team
SEA Games
Gold medal – first place	Kuala Lumpur 2017	Futsal
Gold medal – first place	Hanoi 2021	Futsal
ASEAN Futsal Championship
Gold medal – first place	AFF Futsal Championship 2016	Futsal
Gold medal – first place	AFF Futsal Championship 2017	Futsal
Gold medal – first place	AFF Futsal Championship 2018	Futsal
Gold medal – first place	AFF Futsal Championship 2019	Futsal
Gold medal – first place	AFF Futsal Championship 2022	Futsal
Gold medal – first place	ASEAN Futsal Championship 2026	Futsal
Asian Championship
Silver medal – second place	AFC Futsal Championship 2024	Futsal
- * Club domestic league appearances and goals

Muhamad Osamanmusa (Thai: มูฮัมหมัด อุสมานมูซา; born 19 January 1998) is a Thai futsal player. He plays for Jimbee Cartagena in the Primera División de Futsal, the premier professional futsal league in Spain, and the Thailand national futsal team. He made his international debut at the 2016 AFF Futsal Championship.

== Early life ==
Muhammad was born to a Ghanaian Gonja father, who was also a footballer who played for the Thailand Tobacco Monopoly and the Port Authority of Thailand, and a Thai Malay mother in Bangkok. He is a practicing Muslim.

Muhammad lost his father when he was three years old. His maternal grandmother raised him while his mother worked abroad.

== Honours ==
BTS Bangkok

- Thai FA Futsal Cup: 2017–18
- AFF Futsal Club Championship: 2018

Chonburi Bluewave

- Futsal Thai League: 2020, 2021–22

Jimbee Cartagena

- Primera División de Futsal: 2024–25
- Supercopa de España de Futsal: 2025, 2026
- UEFA Futsal Champions League third place: 2024–25, 2025–26

Thailand

- AFC Futsal Asian Cup Runners-up: 2024
- AFC U-20 Futsal Championship third place: 2017
- ASEAN Futsal Championship: 2016, 2017, 2018, 2019, 2022, 2026
- SEA Games: 2017, 2021

Individual

- AFC Futsal Player of the Year: 2026

== Career statistics ==
=== International goals ===
Scores and results list Thailand's goal tally first.

#	Date	Venue	Opponent	Score	Result	Goals	Competition
1.	23 January 2017	Bangkok, Thailand	Timor-Leste	11–2	won	1	2016 AFF Futsal Championship
2.	25 January 2017	Bangkok, Thailand	Brunei	17–2	won	4	2016 AFF Futsal Championship
3.	27 January 2017	Bangkok, Thailand	Malaysia	5–3	won	2	2016 AFF Futsal Championship
4.	1 August 2017	Bangkok, Thailand	Malaysia	3–1	won	2	Friendly
5.	18 August 2017	Shah Alam, Malaysia	Vietnam	4–1	won	1	2017 Southeast Asian Games
6.	25 August 2017	Shah Alam, Malaysia	Myanmar	10–2	won	1	2017 Southeast Asian Games
7.	9 September 2017	Bangkok, Thailand	Mozambique	6–3	won	2	Friendly
8.	19 September 2017	Ashgabat, Turkmenistan	Lebanon	5–2	won	2	2017 Asian Indoor and Martial Arts Games
9.	21 September 2017	Ashgabat, Turkmenistan	Japan	4–6	lost	2	2017 Asian Indoor and Martial Arts Games
10.	26 October 2017	Ho Chi Minh City, Vietnam	Laos	14–0	won	3	2017 AFF Futsal Championship
11.	27 October 2017	Ho Chi Minh City, Vietnam	Timor-Leste	17–2	won	5	2017 AFF Futsal Championship
12.	28 October 2017	Ho Chi Minh City, Vietnam	Malaysia	6–3	won	2	2017 AFF Futsal Championship
13.	1 November 2017	Ho Chi Minh City, Vietnam	Myanmar	8–3	won	2	2017 AFF Futsal Championship
14.	3 November 2017	Ho Chi Minh City, Vietnam	Malaysia	4–3	won	1	2017 AFF Futsal Championship
15.	21 October 2018	Bangkok, Thailand	Malaysia	7–1	won	2	Friendly
16.	23 October 2018	Bangkok, Thailand	Uzbekistan	6–3	won	2	Friendly
17.	5 November 2018	Yogyakarta, Indonesia	Timor-Leste	14–0	won	3	2018 AFF Futsal Championship
18.	11 November 2018	Yogyakarta, Indonesia	Malaysia	4–2	won	1	2018 AFF Futsal Championship
19.	17 February 2019	Bangkok, Thailand	Kuwait	1–3	lost	1	Friendly
20.	25 September 2019	Nagoya, Japan	Japan	1–3	lost	1	Friendly
21.	21 October 2019	Ho Chi Minh City, Vietnam	Cambodia	12–0	won	3	2019 AFF Futsal Championship
22.	22 October 2019	Ho Chi Minh City, Vietnam	Timor-Leste	12–1	won	3	2019 AFF Futsal Championship
23.	27 October 2019	Ho Chi Minh City, Vietnam	Indonesia	5–0	won	1	2019 AFF Futsal Championship
24.	11 December 2019	Nakhon Ratchasima, Thailand	Oman	11–0	won	2	Friendly
25.	13 December 2019	Nakhon Ratchasima, Thailand	Guatemala	6–1	won	1	Friendly
26.	8 February 2020	Hat Yai, Thailand	Iran	2–1	won	1	Friendly
27.	20 May 2021	Khor Fakkan, United Arab Emirates	Iraq	7–2	won	1	2021 FIFA Futsal World Cup qualification
28.	25 May 2021	Khor Fakkan, United Arab Emirates	Iraq	4–0	won	1	2021 FIFA Futsal World Cup qualification
29.	25 July 2021	Bangkok, Thailand	Mozambique	6–4	won	2	Friendly
30.	26 July 2021	Bangkok, Thailand	Kosovo	6–6	drawn	1	Friendly
31.	29 July 2021	Bangkok, Thailand	Egypt	3–2	won	1	Friendly
32.	4 September 2021	Bangkok, Thailand	Chile	6–1	won	1	Friendly
33.	2 April 2022	Bangkok, Thailand	Brunei	13–0	won	2	2022 AFF Futsal Championship
34.	3 April 2022	Bangkok, Thailand	Cambodia	16–0	won	4	2022 AFF Futsal Championship
35.	5 April 2022	Bangkok, Thailand	Indonesia	2–2	drawn	2	2022 AFF Futsal Championship
36.	8 April 2022	Bangkok, Thailand	Vietnam	3–1	won	2	2022 AFF Futsal Championship
37.	10 April 2022	Bangkok, Thailand	Indonesia	2–2	drawn	1	2022 AFF Futsal Championship
38.	11 May 2022	Phủ Lý, Vietnam	Malaysia	6–2	won	1	2021 Southeast Asian Games
39.	20 May 2022	Phủ Lý, Vietnam	Vietnam	2–0	won	1	2021 Southeast Asian Games
40.	11 October 2023	Bangkok, Thailand	Hong Kong	6–0	won	2	2024 AFC Futsal Asian Cup qualification
41.	17 April 2024	Bangkok, Thailand	China	3–1	won	1	2024 AFC Futsal Asian Cup
42.	19 April 2024	Bangkok, Thailand	Myanmar	5–0	won	1	2024 AFC Futsal Asian Cup
42.	21 April 2024	Bangkok, Thailand	Vietnam	2–1	won	1	2024 AFC Futsal Asian Cup
43.	31 August 2024	Nonthaburi, Thailand	New Zealand	8–0	won	2	Friendly
44.	4 September 2024	Nonthaburi, Thailand	Guatemala	4–6	lost	4	Friendly
45.	6 September 2024	Nonthaburi, Thailand	Afghanistan	2–1	won	1	Friendly
46.	14 September 2024	Bukhara, Uzbekistan	Croatia	2–1	won	1	2024 FIFA Futsal World Cup
47.	17 September 2024	Bukhara, Uzbekistan	Cuba	10–5	won	2	2024 FIFA Futsal World Cup
48.	20 September 2024	Bukhara, Uzbekistan	Brazil	1–9	lost	1	2024 FIFA Futsal World Cup
49.	9 April 2025	Nakhon Ratchasima, Thailand	Kuwait	4–3	won	1	Friendly
50.	31 July 2025	Nonthaburi, Thailand	New Zealand	10–0	won	2	Friendly
51.	2 August 2025	Nonthaburi, Thailand	Belarus	3–1	won	1	Friendly
52.	20 September 2025	Nonthaburi, Thailand	Brunei	15–1	won	4	2026 AFC Futsal Asian Cup qualification
53.	22 September 2025	Nonthaburi, Thailand	Bahrain	4–0	won	1	2026 AFC Futsal Asian Cup qualification
54.	24 September 2025	Nonthaburi, Thailand	South Korea	2–2	drawn	1	2026 AFC Futsal Asian Cup qualification
55.	15 December 2025	Nonthaburi, Thailand	Malaysia	7–1	won	3	2025 SEA Games
56.	18 December 2025	Nonthaburi, Thailand	Vietnam	2–1	won	1	2025 SEA Games
57.	27 January 2026	Jakarta, Indonesia	Lebanon	2–0	won	1	2026 AFC Futsal Asian Cup
58.	29 January 2026	Jakarta, Indonesia	Kuwait	6–1	won	4	2026 AFC Futsal Asian Cup
59.	3 February 2026	Jakarta, Indonesia	Iraq	2–4	lost	1	2026 AFC Futsal Asian Cup
60.	6 April 2026	Nonthaburi, Thailand	Timor-Leste	4–1	won	2	2026 ASEAN Futsal Championship
61.	7 April 2026	Nonthaburi, Thailand	Myanmar	2–0	won	1	2026 ASEAN Futsal Championship
61.	10 April 2026	Nonthaburi, Thailand	Australia	4–3	won	1	2026 ASEAN Futsal Championship
