= Tairong Petchtiam =

Thai futsal player (born 1993)

Personal information
- Full name: Tairong Petchtiam
- Date of birth: 1 July 1993 (age 33)
- Place of birth: Bangkok, Thailand
- Height: 1.77 m (5 ft 9 1/2 in)
- Position: Winger

Team information
- Current team: Surat Thani Futsal Club

Youth career
- 2007–2011: Patumkongka School

Senior career*
Years	Team	Apps	(Gls)
2013	Nonthaburi Futsal Club	9	(3)
2013–2015	North Eastern Uni Khon Kaen	44	(21)
2016–2018	Bangkok City Futsal Club	26	(20)
2019	Chonburi Bluewave Futsal Club		
2020–	Bangkok City Futsal Club	0	(0)

International career
2016–	Thailand Futsal	4	(1)
- * Club domestic league appearances and goals

Tairong Petchtiam (Thai ไตรรงค์ เพ็ชรเทียม), simply known as Deng (Thai เด้ง) is a Thai futsal Ala (winger), and a member of Thailand national futsal team in 2016 FIFA Futsal World Cup. He plays for Surat Thani Futsal Club in Futsal Thailand League.

== International career ==
Under Miguel Rodrigo, Tairong was called for Thailand national futsal team for the first time for 2016 Thailand Five's. He made the official debut on 20 August 2016 against Japan. He also scored a goal in his debut.
