= Mohsen Hassanzadeh =

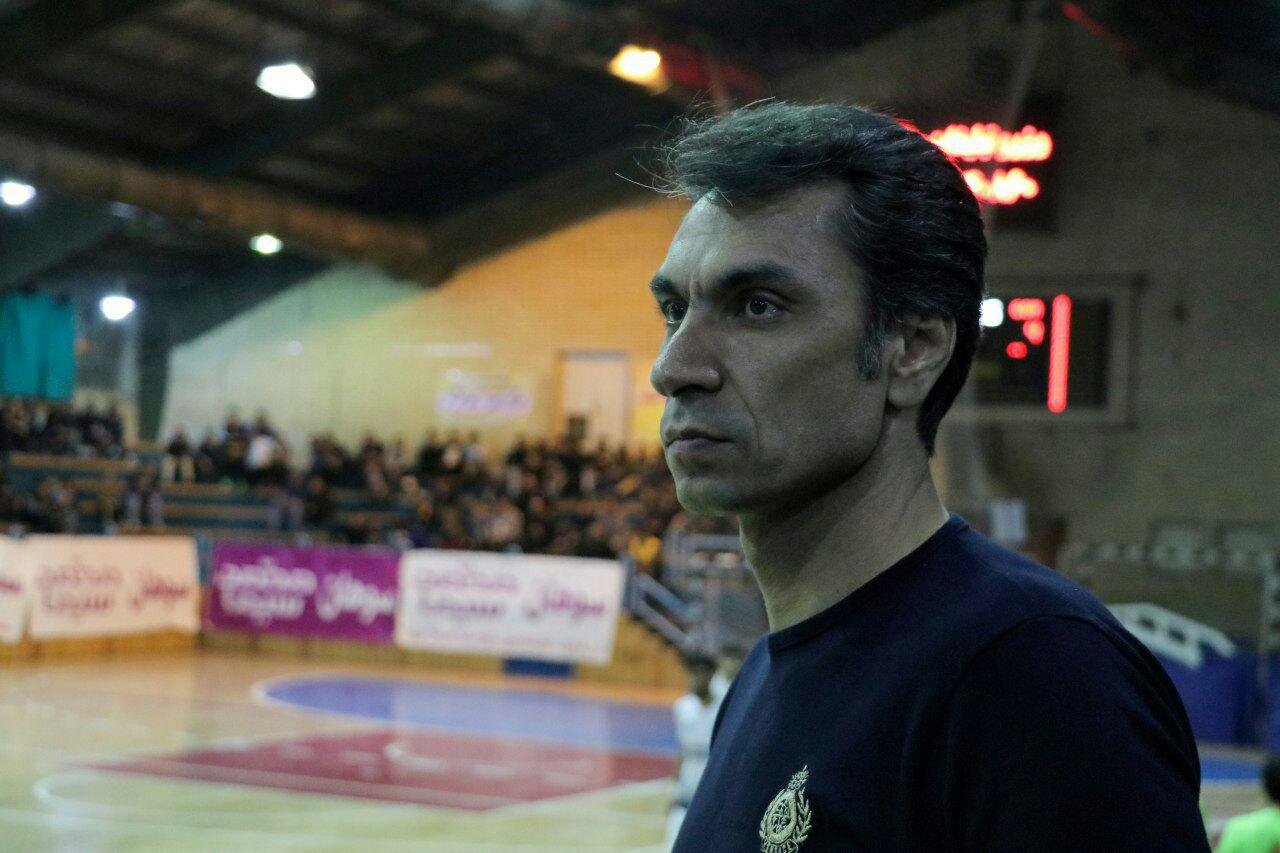
- Hassanzadeh with Ana Sanat in 2019

Personal information
- Full name: Mohsen Hassanzadeh Navlighi
- Date of birth: 28 September 1974 (age 52)
- Place of birth: Qom, Iran
- Position: Defender

Team information
- Current team: Farsh Ara (manager)

Youth career
- Saipa (football)

Senior career*
Years	Team	Apps	(Gls)
- Soheil Qom
- Peyman Tehran
- Faraz Qom
2002–2004	Shensa		
2004–2007	Elmo Adab		
2007–2009	Eram Kish		
2009	Al Sadd		
2010	Poushineh Baft		
2010–2011	Shahrdari Saveh		
2011–2012	Farsh Ara		(2)
2012–2013	Saba		(2)

International career^{‡}
2000–2008	Iran		

Managerial career
- 2012–2013: Saba
- 2013–2014: Mahan Tandis
- 2014–2015: Farsh Ara (assistant)
- 2015–2016: Melli Haffari
- 2016–2017: Shahrdari Saveh
- 2018–2019: Farsh Ara
- 2019: Ana Sanat (technical manager)
- 2019: Ana Sanat
- 2020–2021: Shahid Mansouri
- 2021–2022: Sunich
- 2023–: Farsh Ara
- * Club domestic league appearances and goals as of 15 September 2023 ‡ National team caps and goals as of 22 June 2019

Mohsen Hassanzadeh (Persian: محسن حسن زاده; born 28 September 1974) is an Iranian professional futsal coach and former player. He is currently head coach of Farsh Ara in the Iranian Futsal Super League.

== Personal life ==
He is the older brother of Ali Asghar Hassanzadeh and Mehdi Hassanzadeh.

== Honours ==
=== Player ===
- Iranian Futsal Super League
  - Champion (1): 2003–04 (Shensa)
  - Runners-up (2): 2008–09 (Eram Kish), 2012–13 (Saba)
- Iran Futsal's 1st Division
  - Champion (2): 2004–05 (Elmo Adab), 2010–11 (Shahrdari Saveh)

=== Manager ===
- Iranian Futsal Super League
  - Runners-up (1): 2012–13 (Saba)
- Iranian Futsal Hazfi Cup
  - Champion (1): 2013–14 (Mahan Tandis)
