= Esmaeil Abbasian =

Iranian futsal player (born 1989)

Personal information
- Full name: Esmaeil Abbasian Mehr
- Date of birth: 31 August 1989 (age 37)
- Place of birth: Mashhad, Iran
- Height: 1.80 m (5 ft 11 in)
- Position: Goalkeeper

Youth career
- Jame Asal
- –2007: Elmo Adab

Senior career*
Years	Team	Apps	(Gls)
2007–2010	Elmo Adab	21	
2012–2013	Ferdosi Mashhad	28	
2013	Chonburi Blue Wave	7	
2013–2014	Farsh Ara	12	(0)
2014	Chonburi Blue Wave	8	
2014–2015	Paya Sazeh	5	(0)
2016	Shahrdari Saveh	22	
2017–2018	Shahed Tehran		(0)
2018–2020	Safir Gofteman Tehran		(0)

International career^{‡}
2009–2013	Iran U21	15	
2013	Iran	5	
- * Club domestic league appearances and goals as of 26 May 2021 ‡ National team caps and goals as of 26 May 2021

Esmaeil Abbasian Mehr (Persian: اسماعيل عباسیان‌مهر; born 31 August 1989) is an Iranian professional futsal player.

== Honours ==
=== Country ===
- Grand Prix de Futsal
  - Third Place (1): 2013

=== Club ===
- AFC Futsal Club Championship
  - Champion (1): 2013 (Chonburi Blue Wave)
  - Runners-up (1): 2014 (Chonburi Blue Wave)
- Thailand Futsal League
  - Champion (1): 2014 (Chonburi Blue Wave)
