= 2011 AFC Futsal Club Championship =

Tournament details
- Host country: Qatar
- City: Doha
- Dates: 26 June – 1 July
- Teams: 8
- Venue: 2 (in 1 host city)

Final positions
- Champions: (Japan) Nagoya Oceans (1st title)
- Runners-up: (Iran) Shahid Mansouri
- Third place: (Lebanon) Al-Sadaka
- Fourth place: (Qatar) Al-Rayyan

Tournament statistics
- Matches played: 16
- Goals scored: 118 (7.38 per match)
- Attendance: 3,155 (197 per match)
- Top scorer: (Iran) Ali Asghar Hassanzadeh (10)
- Best player: (Iran) Mohammad Keshavarz

The 2011 AFC Futsal Club Championship was the 2nd AFC Futsal Club Championship. It was held in Doha, Qatar between June 26 and July 1, 2011.

== Qualified teams ==
Team	Qualified as
(China) Zhejiang Dragon	2009–10 Chinese Futsal League winner
(Iran) Shahid Mansouri	2010–11 Iranian Futsal Super League winner
(Japan) Nagoya Oceans	2010–11 F. League winner
(Lebanon) Al-Sadaka Beirut	2010–11 Lebanon Futsal League winner
(Qatar) Al-Rayyan	2009–10 Qatar Futsal League winner
(Thailand) Government Housing Bank RBAC	2010 Thailand Futsal League winner
(Uzbekistan) Ardus Tashkent	2010–11 Uzbek Premiere League winner
Play-off participants
(Indonesia) Harimau Rawa	2010 Indonesian Futsal League winner
(Iraq) Al-Karkh	2010–11 Iraqi Premier League winner

== Venues ==
Doha		Location of the host city of the 2011 AFC Futsal Club Championship.
Al-Rayyan Main Hall	Al-Gharafa Main Hall	Location of the host city of the 2011 AFC Futsal Club Championship.

== Play-off ==
June 22
17:00

Al-Karkh (Iraq)	6 – 1	(Indonesia) Harimau Rawa
Abd-Ali 2', 39'; Ghazi 20', 32', 38'; Saadi 29'	Report	Home 34'

Al-Rayyan Main Hall, Doha
Attendance: 150
Referee: Kim Jang-Kwan (South Korea)

== Group stage ==
=== Group A ===
Team	Pld	W	D	L	GF	GA	GD	Pts
(Japan) Nagoya Oceans	3	3	0	0	21	6	+15	9
(Qatar) Al-Rayyan	3	2	0	1	15	14	+1	6
(Iraq) Al-Karkh	3	0	1	2	11	15	−4	1
(China) Zhejiang Dragon	3	0	1	2	6	18	−12	1

June 26
11:30

Nagoya Oceans (Japan)	8 – 1	(China) Zhejiang Dragon
Kitahara 15'; Morioka 18', 37'; Sakai 23'; Watanabe 28'; Hatakeyama 32', 36'; Mori 39'	Report	Wang Xiang 15'

Al-Rayyan Main Hall, Doha
Attendance: 93
Referee: Nurdin Bukuev (Kyrgyzstan)

June 26
19:00

Al-Rayyan (Qatar)	6 – 5	(Iraq) Al-Karkh
Hassanzadeh 3', 10'; Taheri 12' (pen.), 24'; Raja 36', 36'	Report	Khalid 27', 28', 35'; Mohsin 31'; Ghazi 36'

Al-Rayyan Main Hall, Doha
Attendance: 250
Referee: Vadim Baratov (Turkmenistan)

June 27
11:30

Al-Karkh (Iraq)	2 – 5	(Japan) Nagoya Oceans
Abd-Ali 3' (pen.); Mohsin 36'	Report	Sakai 9'; Henmi 20', 37'; Kogure 25', 29'

Al-Rayyan Main Hall, Doha
Attendance: 50
Referee: Abdulrahman Abdulqader (Bahrain)

June 27
19:00

Zhejiang Dragon (China)	1 – 6	(Qatar) Al-Rayyan
Cong Lin 21'	Report	Bilal 17'; Taheri 17'; Hassanzadeh 25'; Kassab 28'; Mauricinho 35', 38'

Al-Rayyan Main Hall, Doha
Attendance: 328
Referee: Mohamad Chami (Lebanon)

June 28
19:00

Al-Rayyan (Qatar)	3 – 8	(Japan) Nagoya Oceans
Hassanzadeh 12', 23', 40'	Report	Maeda 4'; Kogure 23'; Sakai 26', 27', 28'; Henmi 35'; Kanai 38'; Watanabe 40'

Al-Rayyan Main Hall, Doha
Attendance: 409
Referee: Rey Ritaga (Philippines)

June 28
19:00

Zhejiang Dragon (China)	4 – 4	(Iraq) Al-Karkh
Zhang Wen 18'; Wang Xiang 27'; Cong Lin 30'; Deng Tao 37'	Report	Khalid 20'; Deng Tao 22' (o.g.); Ghazi 27'; Hamdi 28'

Al-Gharafa Main Hall, Doha
Attendance: 30
Referee: Ryan Shepheard (Australia)

=== Group B ===
Team	Pld	W	D	L	GF	GA	GD	Pts
(Iran) Shahid Mansouri	3	3	0	0	14	9	+5	9
(Lebanon) Al-Sadaka	3	1	1	1	7	8	−1	4
(Thailand) GH Bank RBAC	3	0	2	1	8	9	−1	2
(Uzbekistan) Ardus	3	0	1	2	9	12	−3	1

June 26
14:00

Shahid Mansouri (Iran)	4 – 2	(Uzbekistan) Ardus
Vatankhah 10'; Keshavarz 19'; Azimaei 28'; Daneshvar 38'	Report	Sviridov 31'; Sharipov 37'

Al-Rayyan Main Hall, Doha
Attendance: 120
Referee: Kim Jang-Kwan (South Korea)

June 26
16:30

GH Bank RBAC (Thailand)	0 – 0	(Lebanon) Al-Sadaka
	Report

Al-Rayyan Main Hall, Doha
Attendance: 109
Referee: Yasukazu Nobumoto (Japan)

June 27
14:00

Al-Sadaka (Lebanon)	3 – 5	(Iran) Shahid Mansouri
Gorges 14'; Takaji 27', 40'	Report	Azimaei 12', 35'; Daneshvar 22'; Vatankhah 26'; Pariazar 40'

Al-Rayyan Main Hall, Doha
Attendance: 64
Referee: Husein Khalaileh (Jordan)

June 27
16:30

Ardus (Uzbekistan)	4 – 4	(Thailand) GH Bank RBAC
Farhutdinov 8'; Sviridov 26', 37'; Sharipov 29'	Report	Khumthinkaew 6'; Janta 32'; Renato 37', 40'

Al-Rayyan Main Hall, Doha
Attendance: 70
Referee: Nurdin Bukuev (Kyrgyzstan)

June 28
16:00

Shahid Mansouri (Iran)	5 – 4	(Thailand) GH Bank RBAC
Azimaei 2'; Nassiri 11', 20'; Tikdarinejad 18', 38'	Report	Issarasuwipakorn 3', 11'; Renato 12', 40'

Al-Rayyan Main Hall, Doha
Attendance: 158
Referee: Vadim Baratov (Turkmenistan)

June 28
16:00

Al-Sadaka (Lebanon)	4 – 3	(Uzbekistan) Ardus
Koutany 7'; Chaito 7', 39'; Serginho 35'	Report	Irsaliev 2'; Sharipov 12'; Anorov 20'

Al-Gharafa Main Hall, Doha
Attendance: 50
Referee: Zhang Youze (China)

== Knockout stage ==
Semi-finals
June 30 – Doha (ARMH)
(Japan) Nagoya Oceans (a.e.t.)	2
(Lebanon) Al-Sadaka	1
June 30 – Doha (ARMH)
(Iran) Shahid Mansouri (a.e.t.)	6
(Qatar) Al-Rayyan	5

Final
July 1 – Doha (ARMH)
(Japan) Nagoya Oceans (a.e.t.)	3
(Iran) Shahid Mansouri	2
Third place
July 1 – Doha (ARMH)
(Lebanon) Al-Sadaka (pen.)	4 (4)
(Qatar) Al-Rayyan	4 (3)

=== Semi-finals ===
June 30
16:00

Nagoya Oceans (Japan)	2 – 1 (a.e.t.)	(Lebanon) Al-Sadaka
Morioka 3'; Maeda 41'	Report	El Homsi 34'

Al-Rayyan Main Hall, Doha
Attendance: 200
Referee: Nurdin Bukuev (Kyrgyzstan)

June 30
19:00

Shahid Mansouri (Iran)	6 – 5 (a.e.t.)	(Qatar) Al-Rayyan
Rahnama 13', 20'; Azimaei 17', 36'; Esmaeilpour 23'; Keshavarz 44'	Report	Raja 19'; Taheri 27'; Bilal 33'; Hassanzadeh 35', 40'

Al-Rayyan Main Hall, Doha
Attendance: 712
Referee: Kim Jang-Kwan (South Korea)

=== Third-place play-off ===
July 1
15:45

Al-Sadaka (Lebanon)	4 – 4 (a.e.t.)	(Qatar) Al-Rayyan
Koutany 26', 42'; Takaji 37'; El Homsi 37'	Report	Hassanzadeh 6', 42'; Taheri 38'; Serginho 40' (o.g.)
Penalties
Serginho (penalty missed); Hamadani (penalty scored); El Homsi (penalty scored); Takaji (penalty scored); Koutany (penalty scored)	4 – 3	(penalty scored) Mauricinho; (penalty scored) Taheri; (penalty missed) Hassanzadeh; (penalty missed) Kassab; (penalty scored) Raja

Al-Rayyan Main Hall, Doha
Attendance: 262
Referee: Ryan Shepheard (Australia)

=== Final ===
July 1
19:00

Nagoya Oceans (Japan)	3 – 2 (a.e.t.)	(Iran) Shahid Mansouri
Kogure 27'; Morioka 32'; Watanabe 48'	Report	Nassiri 16'; Azimaei 20'

Al-Rayyan Main Hall, Doha
Attendance: 250
Referee: Vadim Baratov (Turkmenistan)

== Awards ==
2011 AFC Futsal Club Championship winners

Nagoya Oceans
1st title

- Most Valuable Player
  - (Iran) Mohammad Keshavarz
- Top Scorer
  - (Iran) Ali Asghar Hassanzadeh (10 goals)
- Fair-Play Award
  - (Qatar) Al-Rayyan

== Final standing ==
Rank	Team
1st place, gold medalist(s)	(Japan) Nagoya Oceans
2nd place, silver medalist(s)	(Iran) Shahid Mansouri
3rd place, bronze medalist(s)	(Lebanon) Al-Sadaka Beirut
4	(Qatar) Al-Rayyan
5	(Thailand) Government Housing Bank RBAC
6	(Iraq) Al-Karkh
7	(Uzbekistan) Ardus Tashkent
8	(China) Zhejiang Dragon

== Top scorers ==
Location of the clubs participating in the 2011 AFC Futsal Club Championship.

Rank	Player	Club	Goals
1	(Iran) Ali Asghar Hassanzadeh	(Qatar) Al-Rayyan	10
2	(Iran) Morteza Azimaei	(Iran) Shahid Mansouri	7
3	(Iran) Mohammad Taheri	(Qatar) Al-Rayyan	5
3	(Brazil) Rafael Sakai	(Japan) Nagoya Oceans	5
5	(Iraq) Hashim Khalid	(Iraq) Al-Karkh	4
5	(Brazil) Renato	(Thailand) GH Bank RBAC	4
5	(Japan) Kenichiro Kogure	(Japan) Nagoya Oceans	4
5	(Japan) Kaoru Morioka	(Japan) Nagoya Oceans	4
9	(Qatar) Ahmad Raja	(Qatar) Al-Rayyan	3
9	(Lebanon) Jean Koutany	(Lebanon) Al-Sadaka	3
9	(Lebanon) Khaled Takaji	(Lebanon) Al-Sadaka	3
9	(Uzbekistan) Jamoliddin Sharipov	(Uzbekistan) Ardus	3
9	(Uzbekistan) Konstantin Sviridov	(Uzbekistan) Ardus	3
9	(Japan) Rafael Henmi	(Japan) Nagoya Oceans	3
9	(Japan) Tomoaki Watanabe	(Japan) Nagoya Oceans	3
9	(Iran) Hamid Nassiri	(Iran) Shahid Mansouri	3
