= Thanatorn Santanaprasit =

Thai futsal player

Personal information
- Birth name: Thanatorn Santanaprasit
- Date of birth: 11 June 1979 (age 47)
- Place of birth: Bangkok, Thailand
- Height: 1.69 m (5 ft 6 1/2 in)
- Position: Defender

Team information
- Current team: Chonburi Blue Wave (Head coach)

Senior career*
Years	Team	Apps	(Gls)
2006–2013	Port Futsal Club		
2014–2017	Chonburi Blue Wave		

International career^{‡}
2006–2017	Thailand	21	(9)

Managerial career
- 2026–: Chonburi Blue Wave
- * Club domestic league appearances and goals ‡ National team caps and goals as of 13:05, 23 May 2008 (UTC)

Thanatorn Santanaprasit (Thai: ธนาธร สันทนาประสิทธิ์), previously Tanakorn (ธนกร), is a former Thai futsal midfielder, and currently a head coach of the Thailand women's national futsal team.

He competed for Thailand at the 2008 FIFA Futsal World Cup finals in Brazil.
