= Thai FA Futsal Cup =

- Founded: 2010
- Country: Thailand
- Current champions: Chonburi Bluewave (2019)
- Most championships: Chonburi Bluewave (5 times)
- Website: http://www.ftlofficial.com/news.php?category=fa-cup
- Current: 2019 Thai FA Futsal Cup

The Thai FA Futsal Cup (Thai: ฟุตซอล เอฟเอคัพ) is a futsal cup competition in Thailand. It was established in 2010. GH Bank R-bac (later known as Chonburi Bluewave) won the first edition of the tournament.

The tournament plays on knock-out basis, so the winner of the tournament is the unbeaten team in each edition. All clubs of Futsal Thailand League and Thailand Division 1 Futsal League automatically qualified for the tournament while non-league teams, such as school, futsal academies, universities, amateur or semi-pro futsal teams, etc. joined the qualification stage of the tournament.

== List of winners ==
Year	Winner	Result	Runner-up	Venue
2010	GH Bank R-bac	4–4(8–7)p	Port Authority	MCC Hall The Mall Ngamwongwan
2011	GH Bank R-bac	5–4	Rajnavy	MCC Hall The Mall Ngamwongwan
2012–13	Rajnavy	4–1	CAT Futsal Club	Fashion Island Shopping Mall Ramindra
2014	Chonburi Bluewave	3–2	Bangkok	Fashion Island Shopping Mall Ramindra
2015	Chonburi Bluewave	3–2	Port Authority	Fashion Island Shopping Mall Ramindra
2017-18	BTS Bangkok Futsal Club	1-1 (9–8)p.	Department of Highways Futsal Club	Fashion Island Shopping Mall Ramindra
2018-19	Port	5-5 (7–6)p.	Chonburi Bluewave	Fashion Island Shopping Mall Ramindra
2019	Chonburi Bluewave	2-2 (6–5)p.	Port	Fashion Island Shopping Mall Ramindra
