= 2019 AFF Futsal Club Championship =

Tournament details
- Host country: Thailand
- City: Nakhon Ratchasima
- Dates: 18–23 June
- Teams: 6 (from 1 sub-confederation)
- Venue: 1 (in 1 host city)

Final positions
- Champions: (Thailand) PTT Chonburi Bluewave

Tournament statistics
- Matches played: 11

2019 AFF Invitational Futsal Club Championship was the fifth edition of AFF Futsal Club Championship. The tournament was held in Nakhon Ratchasima, Thailand from 18 to 23 June 2019. The title of the tournament was also changed into AFF Futsal Cup. The defending champion was Bangkok BTS but they didn't take part in this edition.

== Participants ==
=== Group A ===
Association	Team
Thailand	PTT Chonburi Bluewave
Vietnam	SS Khánh Hòa
Indonesia	Black Steel Manokwari

=== Group B ===
Association	Team
Malaysia	Melaka United
Myanmar	MIC
Cambodia	Down Town Sport

== Group stage ==
All times are local, WIB (UTC+7).

=== Group A ===
Pos	Team	Pld	W	D	L	GF	GA	GD	Pts	Qualification
1	(Thailand) PTT Chonburi Bluewave	2	1	1	0	13	7	+6	4	Knockout stage
2	(Vietnam) SS Khánh Hòa	2	1	0	1	7	9	−2	3	Knockout stage
3	(Indonesia) Black Steel Manokwari	2	0	1	1	6	10	−4	1	Fifth place playoff

Source: AFF
18 June 2019
14:00

Black Steel Manokwari (Indonesia)	5 : 5	(Thailand) PTT Chonburi Bluewave

Terminal 21 Hall, Nakhon Rachasima
19 June 2019
14:00

SS Khánh Hòa (Vietnam)	5 : 1	(Indonesia) Black Steel Manokwari

Terminal 21 Hall, Nakhon Rachasima
20 June 2019
14:00

PTT Chonburi Bluewave (Thailand)	8 : 2	(Vietnam) SS Khánh Hòa

Terminal 21 Hall, Nakhon Rachasima

=== Group B ===
Pos	Team	Pld	W	D	L	GF	GA	GD	Pts	Qualification
1	(Myanmar) MIC	2	2	0	0	16	5	+11	6	Knockout stage
2	(Cambodia) Down Town Sport	2	1	0	1	8	13	−5	3	Knockout stage
3	(Malaysia) Melaka United	2	0	0	2	6	12	−6	0	Fifth place playoff

Source: AFF
18 June 2019
16:00

Melaka United (Malaysia)	2 : 7	(Myanmar) MIC

Terminal 21 Hall, Nakhon Rachasima
19 June 2019
16:00

Down Town Sport (Cambodia)	5 : 4	(Malaysia) Melaka United

Terminal 21 Hall, Nakhon Rachasima
20 June 2019
16:00

MIC (Myanmar)	9 : 3	(Cambodia) Down Town Sport

Terminal 21 Hall, Nakhon Rachasima

== Fifth-place match ==
21 June 2019
12:45

Black Steel Manokwari (Indonesia)	2 : 2	(Malaysia) Melaka United
Penalties
	1 : 3

Terminal 21 Hall, Nakhon Rachasima

== Knockout stage ==
=== Bracket ===
Semi-finals
(Thailand) PTT Chonburi Bluewave	17
(Cambodia) Down Town Sport	0
(Myanmar) MIU	0
(Vietnam) SS Khánh Hòa	6

Final
(Thailand) PTT Chonburi Bluewave	9
(Vietnam) SS Khánh Hòa	1
Third place
(Cambodia) Downtown Sport	5
(Myanmar) MIU	9

=== Semi-finals ===
22 June 2019
12:45

MIU (Myanmar)	0 : 6	(Vietnam) SS Khánh Hòa

Terminal 21 Hall, Nakhon Rachasima
22 June 2019
14:45

PTT Chonburi Bluewave (Thailand)	17 : 0	(Cambodia) Downtown Sport

Terminal 21 Hall, Nakhon Rachasima

=== Third-place match ===
23 June 2019
12:45

Down Town Sport (Cambodia)	5 : 9	(Myanmar) MIU

Terminal 21 Hall, Nakhon Rachasima

=== Final ===
23 June 2019
14:45

PTT Chonburi Bluewave (Thailand)	9 : 1	(Vietnam) SS Khánh Hòa

Terminal 21 Hall, Nakhon Rachasima

== Winner ==
2019 AFF Futsal Club Championship Champion
(Thailand)
PTT Chonburi Bluewave
First title

== Final standings ==
Rank	Team
1st place, gold medalist(s)	(Thailand) PTT Chonburi Bluewave
2nd place, silver medalist(s)	(Vietnam) SS Khánh Hòa
3rd place, bronze medalist(s)	(Myanmar) MIU
4	(Cambodia) Downtown Sport
5	(Malaysia) Melaka United
6	(Indonesia) Black Steel Manokwari
