= Hamidreza Rahanjam =

Iranian futsal player (born 1994)

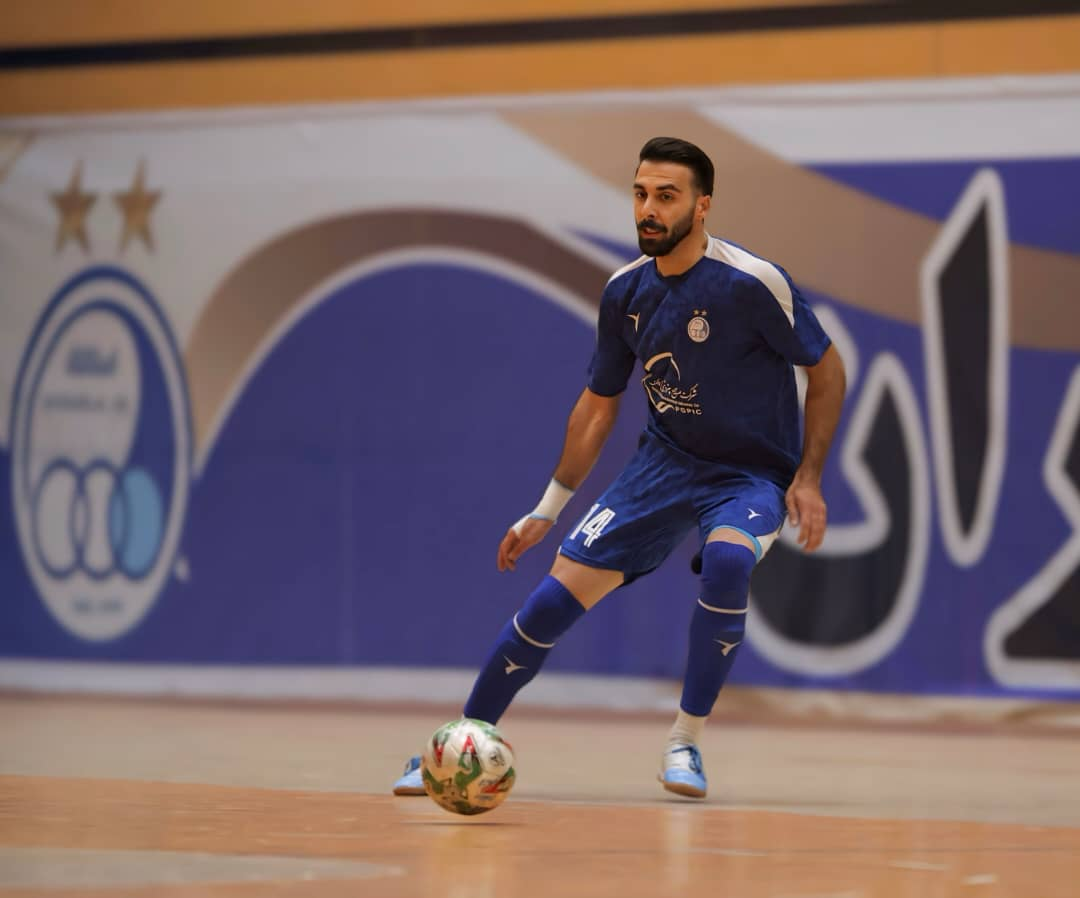

Personal information
- Full name: Hamidreza Rahanjam
- Date of birth: 30 April 1994 (age 32)
- Place of birth: Behshahr, Iran
- Height: 1.85 m (6 ft 1 in)
- Positions: Pivot; Flank

Team information
- Current team: Pendekar United Futsal Club Jakarta
- Number: 14

Senior career*
Years	Team	Apps	(Gls)
2013–2017	Shahrvand Sari		
2017–2018	Moghavemat Alborz		
2018–2020	Shahrvand Sari		
2019–2020	Naft Al-Wasat Iraq (loan)		
2020–2021	Raga Tehran		
2021–2022	Baiterek Kazakhstan		
2022–2023	Crop Alvand		
2022–2023	Gohar zamin Sirjan		
2023-	Pendekar United Futsal Club Jakarta		

International career
2016-Present	Iran		
- * Club domestic league appearances and goals

Hamidreza Rahanjam (Persian: حمیدرضا ره‌انجام; born 30 April 1994 in Behshahr) is an Iranian professional futsal player. He plays in Pendekar United Futsal Club Jakarta. Rahanjam has a record of scoring the most beautiful goal in Iranian Futsal Super League and has been a member of Iran national futsal team since 2015.

He managed to score the best goal of the season in the 21st season of Iranian Futsal Super League. Rahnjam was also selected as the best young player of the season in the 16th edition of Iranian Futsal Super League, which was held in 2014.

== Becoming a legionnaire ==
For the first time during his tenure in Shahrvand Sari team, Rahanjam faced an offer to participate in the Iraqi Futsal Premier League, which he accepted and joined the Naft Al-Wasat team. Hamidreza Rahanjam also has a history of playing in Kazakhstan's Baitrak team And after one season in the league of this country, he signed a contract and joined Crop Alvand FSC.

== Honours ==
- The best young player in the 16th season of Iranian premier futsal league
- The scorer of the best goal of the season in the 21st season of Iranian premier futsal league
- The best scorer of the Kazakhstan Futsal Premier League in 2021
