= I Am Sport Futsal Club =

Thai futsal club

I Am Sport
- Full name: I Am Sport Futsal Club
- Nickname(s): The Knights
- Founded: 2002
- Chairman: (Thailand) Pakpoom Kiatsrichai
- Manager: (Brazil) Ronaldo Castro
- League: Thailand Futsal League
Home colours	Away colours

I Am Sport Futsal Club (Thai: สโมสรฟุตซอลไอแอม สปอร์ต) is a Thai Futsal club. It currently plays in the Thailand Futsal League.

== Players ==
=== Current squad ===
Note: Flags indicate national team as defined under FIFA eligibility rules; some limited exceptions apply. Players may hold more than one non-FIFA nationality.

No.	Pos.	Nation	Player
—		(Thailand) THA	Sarawut Jaipet
—		(Brazil) BRA	Maykel Jamil Ferreira
—		(Thailand) THA	Kittipol Ekjit
—		(Brazil) BRA	Francisco Jackson
—		(Thailand) THA	Weerasak Aroonpulsub
—		(Thailand) THA	Anuwat Patarn
—		(Thailand) THA	Tum Timmanont
—		(Thailand) THA	Narongsak Kongkaew
—		(Thailand) THA	Pitipong Taweeklang
—		(Thailand) THA	Surachart Pongjeen
—		(Thailand) THA	Panya Buakam
—		(Thailand) THA	Nampol Sombunkit
