= Sripatum Sunlite Sisaket =

Thai futsal club

Sripatum Sisaket ศรีปทุม ศรีสะเกษ
- Full name: Sripatum sisaket Futsal Club สโมสรฟุตซอลศรีปทุม ศรีสะเกษ
- Nickname: The Bee Slayer
- Founded: 2012
- Ground: Sirivanvari Keelaves Arena
- Capacity: 2000
- Chairman: chatchai pukkhayaporn
- Manager: Settakornchai Chuenta
- League: Thailand Futsal League
Home colours	Away colours

Sripatum Sisaket Futsal Club (Thai สโมสรฟุตซอลศรีปทุม ศรีสะเกษ) is a Thai Futsal club, nicknamed The Bee Slayer and based in Sisaket Province located in the note eastern of Thailand. The club currently plays in the Thailand Futsal League.
