= Elmo Adab Mashhad FSC =

Iranian futsal club

Elmo Adab
- Full name: Elmo Adab Saipa Mashhad Futsal Club
- Founded: 1997
- Dissolved: Temporarily since December 2011
- Ground: Shahid Beheshti Arena, Mashhad
- Capacity: 6,000

Elmo Adab Mashhad Futsal Club (Persian: باشگاه فوتسال علم و ادب مشهد) was an Iranian Futsal club based in Mashhad, Iran. "Elm" means Science and "Adab" means Politeness. Elmo Adab FSC has been awarded a number of different moral titles such as the Morality Cup of the League, and the national title of premier moral club manager.

== History ==
Established in 1997, this club commenced its activity as the Seiro Safar club, later in 2004 the club title was changed to Elmo Adab. Also, in 2007–08, 2008–09, 2010–11, and the beginning of 2011–12, the club was operated under the sponsorship of Saipa Cultural and Athletic Corporation as the Elmo Adab of Saipa club. In mid-2011, the Elmo Adab futsal club was hired temporarily by the Farsh Ara.

== Season-by-season ==
The table below chronicles the achievements of the Club in various competitions.

Season	League										Leagues Top goalscorer		Manager
Season	Division		P	W	D	L	GF	GA	Pts	Pos	Name	Goals	Manager
2003–04	Local League	1st Round								1st			
2003–04	Local League	2nd Round								1st			
2003–04	Local League	Final	Daneshgah Oloum Pezeshki ?-? Elmo Adab							2nd			
2004–05	1st Division	Group Stage								1st			Sadegh Varmazyar
2004–05	1st Division	Play Off	Kesht va Sanat Neyshekar 3-6 Elmo Adab							Promoted			Hossein Shams
2004–05	1st Division	Final	Elmo Adab 12 - 2 Fajr Ghaem							Champions			Hossein Shams
2005–06	Super League		26	13	5	8	95	71	44	5th			Hossein Shams
2007–08	Super League		25	11	6	8	77	65	39	5th			Alireza Afzal
2008–09	Super League		22	5	8	9	50	67	23	9th^{1}			Alireza Pazoki / Amir Edalatkhah / Hamid Bigham
2009–10	Super League		26	10	7	9	77	77	37	7th	Mahdi Javid	17	Hamid Shandizi Moghaddam
2010–11	Super League		23	10	3	10	59	58	33	7th			Hamid Shandizi Moghaddam
2011–12	Super League		13	4	2	7	25	34	14	9th*			Hamid Shandizi Moghaddam
2011–12	Super League		terminated their sports activities due to financial problems in half season										Hamid Shandizi Moghaddam
Super League Total			135	53	31	51	385	375	190				

Notes:
* unofficial titles
1 worst title in history of club

Key

- P = Played
- W = Games won
- D = Games drawn
- L = Games lost
- GF = Goals for
- GA = Goals against
- Pts = Points
- Pos = Final position

Champions	Runners-up	Third Place	Fourth Place	Did not qualify	Promoted	not held

== Players ==
=== Notable players ===
- (Iran) Hossein Tayyebi
- (Iran) Mostafa Tayyebi
- (Iran) Mahdi Javid
- (Iran) Ghodrat Bahadori
- (Iran) Mohammad Reza Heidarian
- (Iran) Mohsen Hassanzadeh
- (Iran) Mohammad Hashemzadeh
- (Iran) Alireza Samimi

- (Iran) Esmaeil Abbasian
- (Iran) Hamid Ahmadi

== Honors ==
National:

- Local League
  - Runners-up (1): 2003–04
- Iran Futsal's 1st Division
  - Champions (1): 2004–05
