= Morteza Azimaei =

Iranian futsal player

Personal information
- Full name: Morteza Azimaei Divkolaei
- Date of birth: 11 September 1982 (age 44)
- Place of birth: Amirkola, Babol, Iran
- Position: Pivot

Senior career*
Years	Team	Apps	(Gls)
2003–2010	Shahrvand		(190)
2010–2012	Shahid Mansouri		(36)
2012–2018	Shahrvand		(69)
2018–2019	Houmine El Faouqa		(22)

International career^{‡}
- Iran

Managerial career
- 2021: Shahrvand (assistant)
- 2022: Ghand Katrin (assistant)
- * Club domestic league appearances and goals as of 29 August 2022 ‡ National team caps and goals as of 08 October 2014

Morteza Azimaei Divkolaei (Persian: مرتضی عظیمایی دیوکُلایی; born 11 September 1982) is an Iranian professional futsal coach and former player.

== Honours ==
=== Country ===
- AFC Futsal Championship
  - Champion (1): 2005
- Asian Indoor Games
  - Champion (1): 2005
- Confederations Cup
  - Champion (1): 2009
- Grand Prix de Futsal
  - Runner-up (1): 2009

=== Club ===
- AFC Futsal Club Championship
  - Runners-up (1): 2011 (Shahid Mansouri)
- Iranian Futsal Super League
  - Champion (2): 2010–11 (Shahid Mansouri) - 2011–12 (Shahid Mansouri)

=== Individual ===
- Top Goalscorer:
  - Iranian Futsal Super League: 2008–09 (Shahrvand) (32 goals)

Sporting positions
Preceded by (Iran) Vahid Shamsaei	Iranian Futsal Super League top scorer 08–09 (32 Goals) with Vahid Shamsaei	Succeeded by (Iran) Vahid Shamsaei
