= 2004–05 Iran Futsal's 1st Division =

Iranian Futsal 1st Division
- Season: 2004–05
- Champions: Elmo Adab
- Promoted: Elmo Adab; Fajr Ghaem
- Relegated: Fakhr Aluminium; Alisadr

The 2004–05 Iranian Futsal 1st Division will be divided into two phases.

The league will also be composed of 16 teams divided into two divisions of 8 teams each, whose teams will be divided geographically. Teams will play only other teams in their own division, once at home and once away for a total of 14 matches each.

== Teams ==
=== Group A ===
Team	City
Alisadr	Hamadan
Dabiri	Tabriz
Elmo Adab	Mashhad
Fajr Ghaem	Galugah
Felamingo	Qazvin
Nemoneh Restaurant	Qazvin
Sanaye Choub Mahboubi	Amol
Sanaye Sang	Tonekabon

=== Group B ===
Team	City
Fakhr Aluminium	Arak
Kesht va Sanat Neyshekar Amirkabir	Ahvaz
Daneshgah Oloum Pezeshki	Qom
Chehelsotoun	Isfahan
Daryanavardan	Bushehr
Moghavemat	Shiraz
Zoghalsang	Kerman
Payam Navid	Shiraz

== Play Off ==
Team 1	Agg.	Team 2	1st leg	2nd leg
Kesht va Sanat Neyshekar	3-6	Elmo Adab	2-4	1-2

Elmo Adab Promoted to the Super League.

=== First leg ===
Kesht va Sanat Neyshekar	2 - 4	Elmo Adab

=== Return leg ===
Elmo Adab	2 - 1	Kesht va Sanat Neyshekar
Moslem Tolouei; Daniar Abdyraimov		Ali Rashidi

Team 1	Agg.	Team 2	1st leg	2nd leg
Fajr Ghaem	10-10	Payam Navid	5-4	5-6

Fajr Ghaem Promoted to the Super League.

== Final ==
Elmo Adab	12 - 2	Fajr Ghaem

== See also ==
- 2004–05 Iranian Futsal Super League
- 2004–05 Persian Gulf Cup
- 2004–05 Azadegan League
- 2004–05 Iran Football's 2nd Division
- 2004–05 Iran Football's 3rd Division
- 2004–05 Hazfi Cup
- Iranian Super Cup
