= Phuket United Futsal Club =

Thai futsal club

Phuket United
- Full name: Phuket United Futsal Club
- Chairman: (Thailand)
- Manager: (Thailand)
- League: Thailand Futsal League

Phuket United Futsal Club (Thai สโมสรฟุตซอลภูเก็ตยูไนเต็ด) is a Thai Futsal club.
