= Pattaya Thai-Tech Futsal Club =

Thai futsal club

- Full name: Pattaya Thai-Tech Futsal Club
- Nickname(s): The Dolphins; Thai Tech
- Founded: 2017
- Ground: Muang Pattaya 2 School Gymnasium; Pattaya, Bang Lamung, Chonburi, Thailand
- Capacity: 500
- Chairman: Somchai Kaewsong
- Manager: Somkid Chuenta
- League: Futsal Thai League
Home colours	Away colours

Pattaya Thai-Tech Futsal Club (Thai สโมสรฟุตซอลพัทยา ไทย-เทค) is a Thai Futsal club based in Pattaya, Chonburi Province. The club plays in the Futsal Thai League.
