= Nakhon Ratchasima V-One Futsal Club =

Thai futsal club

- Full name: Nakhon Ratchasima V-One Futsal Club
- Nicknames: The Super Cats (เจ้าแมวพิฆาต)
- Founded: 2015
- Ground: Korat Chatchai Hall; Nakhon Ratchasima Province, Thailand
- Capacity: 5,000
- Chairman: Chatchavarn Wongjohn
- Manager: Dissapong Kongsawat
- League: Futsal Thai League
Home colours	Away colours

Nakhon Ratchasima V-One Futsal Club (Thai alphabet สโมสรฟุตซอลนครราชสีมา เดอะมอลล์ วี-วัน) is a Thailand futsal club based in Nakhon Ratchasima Province. The club plays in the Thailand Futsal League.
