= Qatar Futsal League =

- Founded: 2007
- Country: Qatar
- Confederation: AFC
- Number of clubs: 10
- Level on pyramid: 1
- Domestic cup: Qatari Futsal Super Cup
- International cup: AFC Futsal Club Championship
- Current champions: Al-Rayyan (2010–11)
- Most championships: Al-Rayyan (3 titles)
- Current: 2011-12 season

The Qatar Futsal League, is the top league for Futsal in Qatar. The league champions automatically qualify for the AFC Futsal Club Championship.

== History ==
The league was founded in 2007.

== Qatar Futsal League Member Clubs ==
- Table as of 2011-12 Season

Qatar Stars League
Club	Location
Al-Ahly Doha	Doha
Al-Arabi Doha Sports Club	Doha
Al-Gharafa Sports Club	Al-Gharafa, Al-Rayyan
Al-Khor Sports Club	Al Khor
Al Rayyan Futsal Team	Al-Rayyan
Al Sadd Futsal Team	Al-Sadd, Doha
Al-Wakrah Sports Club	Al Wakrah
Qatar SC	Al Dafna, Doha
Umm-Salal Sports Club	Umm Salal
Al-Shamal Sports Club	Madinat ash Shamal

== Championship history ==
Seasons	Winner
2006–07	Al-Rayyan
2007–08	Al-Saad
2008–09	Al-Saad
2009–10	Al-Rayyan
2010–11	Al-Rayyan
2011–12	Al-Saad
2012–13	Al-Saad
2013–14	Al-Rayyan
2014–15	Al-Rayyan
2015–16	Al-Saad
2016–17	Al-Saad
2017–18	Al-Sailiya
2018–19	Al-Rayyan
2019–20	Al Rayyan

== See also ==
- AFC Futsal Club Championship
