= Al Sadd Futsal Team =

Al Sadd
- Full name: Al Sadd Futsal Team
- Nicknames: Al Zaeem (The Boss); Al Dheeb (The Wolf)
- Ground: Jassim bin Hamad Indoor Hall; Doha, Qatar
- Capacity: 4,000
- Chairman: (Qatar) Mohammed bin Hamad Al Thani
- Manager: (Qatar) Mohammad Eisa Al-Qubaisi
- League: Qatar Futsal League
- 2012–13: 1st
Home colours	Away colours

Al Sadd Futsal Team is part of the Al Sadd Sports Club in Qatar. It is a futsal team based in Doha, Qatar and it plays its home matches in the Jassim bin Hamad Indoor Hall. Al Sadd have been the most successful team in the Qatar professional futsal league since its inauguration in 2006/2007, winning it a total of four times.

Al Sadd participated in the 2010 AFC Futsal Club Championship. They topped their group and advanced to the semi-finals where they beat Nagoya Oceans by a margin of 7–4. They subsequently lost 5–2 to Foolad Mahan in Tehran in the final. No other Qatari club has ever reached the finals of the AFC Futsal Club Championship since its inauguration in 2010.

The team was inaugurated in the Guinness Book of World Records in March 2014 for winning 34 matches in a row from January 2012 to March 2013, the most consecutive matches any futsal team has ever won.

== Season to season ==
As of December 31, 2013.

Season	Division	Place	Qatar Federation Cup	Super Cup	AFC Club Championship
2006/07	QFL	2nd	Not Held	Not Held	Not Held
2007/08	QFL	1st	Not Held	Not Held	Not Held
2008/09	QFL	1st	Semi Finalist	Not Held	Not Held
2009/2010	QFL	2nd	1st	Not Held	Finalist
2010/2011	QFL	3rd	Quarter Finalist	Finalist	Did not participate
2011/2012	QFL	1st	Not held	Did not participate	Did not participate
2012/2013	QFL	1st	Finalist	Finalist	Group Stages

== First team current squad 2012/13 ==
As of December 31, 2013.

No.	Player	Full name	Pos.	Nat.
1	Gabriel	Gabriel Giménez	Goalkeeper	(Paraguay)
2	Flavio	Flavio Barreto	Defender	(Brazil)
3	Samir	Samir Samih	Pivot	(Jordan)
4	Ebrahim	Ebrahim Abdollah	Defender	(Qatar)
5	M.Ali	Mohammed Ali	Defender	(Qatar)
7	Amro	Amro Mohssein (C)	Defender/Flank	(Qatar)
8	H.Al-Ahbabi	Hamad Al-Ahbabi	Pivot	(Qatar)
9	M.Ismail	Mohamed Ismail	Pivot	(Egypt)
10	Rodrigo	Rodrigo Rocha	Pivot	(Qatar)
11	E.Najjar	Ebrahim Najjar	Winger	(Qatar)
12	S.Taha	Saleh Taha	Pivot	(Qatar)
13	Nawaf	Nawaf Nasser	Goalkeeper	(Qatar)
15	M.Rashid	Mohammed Rashid	Defender	(Qatar)
18	A.Khalil	Ahmed Khalil	Goalkeeper	(Qatar)
20	A.Taha	Amr Taha	Goalkeeper	(Qatar)

== Current technical staff ==
As of December 31, 2013.

- Team manager: (Qatar) Ali Khalifa Al-Dosari
- Administrator: (Qatar) Abdullah Al-Balushi
- Head coach: (Qatar) Mohammad Eisa Al-Qubaisi
- Assistant coach: (Qatar) Mohammed Attiyah
- Goalkeeping coach: (Qatar) Mohsen Karim Dad
- Physiotherapist: (North Macedonia) Stefcho Petan

== Managerial history ==
- (Belgium) Redouane Lhbibani (2007–08)
- (Brazil) Fabiano Ribeiro (2009–10)
- (Qatar) Mohammad Eisa Al-Qubaisi (2011–present)

== Club honours ==
- 4 Qatar League: (2007–2008), (2008–2009), (2011–2012), (2012–2013)
- 1 Qatar Association Cup: (2009–2010)
