= Bangkok City Futsal Club =

Bangkok City บางกอกซิตี้
- Full name: Bangkok City Futsal Club สโมสรฟุตซอลบางกอกซิตี้
- Nicknames: The Godly Dragons มังกรเทพ
- Founded: 2016
- Ground: Thai-Japanese Youth Centre Hall 2 Bangkok, Thailand
- Capacity: 1,300
- Chairman: Rangsan Keeyapat
- Manager: Jeerawat Homklin
- League: Futsal Thai League
- 2016: 4th

Bangkok City Futsal Club (Thai สโมสรฟุตซอลบางกอกซิตี้) is a Thai Futsal club based in Bangkok. The club competes in the Thailand Futsal League, the top tier of Thai futsal.

The club was formed in 2016 following the dissolution of Phuket United Futsal Club. Entrepreneur Rangsan Keeyapat acquired the former club’s license, rebranded it as Bangkok City Futsal Club, and relocated the team to Bangkok.

Although sometimes described as a continuation of the former Phuket United team, Bangkok City’s competitive record officially begins in 2016 with its entry into the Thailand Futsal League. No verified record indicates that either Bangkok City or Phuket United won the 2008 Thai Futsal League, and that claim remains unconfirmed.
