= Department of Highways Futsal Club =

Thai futsal club

Department of Highways กรมทางหลวง ไฮเวย์
- Full name: Department of Highways Futsal Club สโมสรฟุตซอลกรมทางหลวง ไฮเวย์
- Nickname(s): The Highways
- Founded: 2012
- Ground: Plaibang Municipality Gymnasium
- Capacity: 200
- Chairman: (Thailand) Wisan Maiwijit
- League: Futsal Thai League
- 2016: 7th

Department of Highways Futsal Club (Thai สโมสรฟุตซอลกรมทางหลวง ไฮเวย์) is a Thai Futsal club based in Bangkok. The club currently plays in the Thailand Futsal League. The club was founded in 2012 under the control of Thai Mistry of Transport. The club promoted to the top league in 2016 season.
