= Port Futsal Club =

Thai futsal club

Port การท่าเรือ
- Full name: Port Futsal Club สโมสรฟุตซอลการท่าเรือ
- Nickname: The Port Lions
- Founded: 2006
- Ground: Kodang futsal stadium. Klong toey. Bangkok, Thailand
- Capacity: 600
- Chairman: (Thailand) Lt. Chamnarn Chairid
- Manager: (Thailand) Udom Taveesuk
- League: Futsal Thailand League
Home colours	Away colours

Port Futsal Club (Thai สโมสรฟุตซอลการท่าเรือ) is a Thai Futsal club. They currently play in the Thailand Futsal League.

There is an associated football club.

== Honours ==
=== Domestic Leagues ===
- Thailand Futsal League
  - (gold) Winners (4) : 2007, 2018, 2019, 2022–23
  - (silver) Runner Up (5) : 2010, 2012–13, 2014, 2016, 2017
  - (bronze) Third Place (2) : 2011–12, 2015
- Thai FA Futsal Cup
  - (gold) Winners (1) : 2018
  - (silver) Runner Up (3) : 2010, 2015, 2019

=== Continental ===
- AFC Futsal Club Championship
  - 4th Place (1) : 2010

=== Regional ===
- AFF Futsal Club Championship
  - (gold) Winners (3) : 2015, 2016, 2017

== Current players ==
Note: Flags indicate national team as defined under FIFA eligibility rules; some limited exceptions apply. Players may hold more than one non-FIFA nationality.

No.	Pos.	Nation	Player
2	GK	THA	Prakit Dankhuntod
3	FW	THA	Worasak Srirangpirot
5	MF	THA	Phakawat
6	DF	THA	Lertchai Issarasuwipakorn
7	DF	THA	Chaivat Jamgrajang
8	FW	THA	Jetsada Chudech
10	DF	BRA	Marcos De Mendonca
12	MF	THA	Watchara Laisri
13	FW	THA	Tanakol
14	DF	THA	Pornmongkol Srisubseang (captain)
15	MF	THA	Tharadol

No.	Pos.	Nation	Player
17	MF	THA	Thananchai Chomboon
18	GK	THA	Kanison Phoopan
20	FW	BRA	Gomes
22	MF	THA	Ankul
23	MF	THA	Pramot
24	MF	THA	Sorasak Phoonjungreed
27	GK	THA	Nuttapong
32	DF	THA	Weerayut
37	MF	THA	Suttiporn
