= Nonthaburi Futsal Club =

Thai futsal club

Nonthaburi
- Full name: Nonthaburi Futsal Club
- Nickname: The Killer Bees
- Founded: 2006
- Stadium: ลำโพสเตเดี้ยม
- Capacity: 200
- Chairman: (Thailand) Thongchai Yenprasert
- Manager: (Thailand) Pataveekorn Ruen-seur
- League: Futsal Thai League
Home colours	Away colours	Third colours

Previous logo

Nonthaburi Futsal Club (Thai สโมสรฟุตซอลนนทบุรี) is a Thai futsal club which currently plays in the Thailand Futsal League.

== Players ==
=== Current squad ===
Note: Flags indicate national team as defined under FIFA eligibility rules; some limited exceptions apply. Players may hold more than one non-FIFA nationality.

No.	Pos.	Nation	Player
—	GK	THA	Keerati Jongsatitsatien
—	GK	THA	Peerawat Changyao
—	DF	THA	Phuchong Jarernsrihassana
—	DF	THA	Boonsom Naktanom
—	DF	THA	Phudit Tosongkroh
—	MF	THA	Piyapong Songpew
—	MF	THA	Silayut Klerm-yai
—	MF	THA	Panjapol Sri-pat
—	MF	THA	Piyawong Jangveha
—	FW	THA	Prapassorn Srisukontamitr
—	FW	THA	Anucha Krai-rurk
—	FW	THA	Narongkorn Ploy-mee
