= Chonburi Bluewave Futsal Club =

Thai futsal club

Bluewave Chonburi บลูเวฟ ชลบุรี
- Full name: Bluewave Chonburi Futsal Club (สโมสรฟุตซอลบลูเวฟชลบุรี)
- Nicknames: The Sharks (ฉลามชลโต๊ะเล็ก)
- Founded: 2006
- Ground: Bluewave Arena, Mueang Chonburi, Chonburi, Thailand (บลูเวฟ อารีน่า, อำเภอเมืองชลบุรี, จังหวัดชลบุรี, ประเทศไทย)
- Capacity: 3,000
- Chairman: Tachapat Benjasiriwan
- Coach: Lluís Bernat Molina
- League: Futsal Thai League
Home colours	Away colours

Bluewave Chonburi Futsal Club (Thai สโมสรฟุตซอลชลบุรี บลูเวฟ) is a Thai futsal club based in Chonburi. They currently play in the Futsal Thailand League.

== History ==
=== Beginnings ===
Chonburi Bluewave Futsal Club founded in 2006 and affiliated to the first season of the Thailand Futsal League. Chonburi Bluewave Futsal Club won the championship two times in the 2006 and 2009 season before the end of the provisional squad.

=== The Thai giant ===
The team has come back again under the control by the Chonburi Sports Association and Chonburi Football Club as Government Housing Bank RBAC Chonburi Futsal Club or (GHB-RBAC Chonburi Futsal club) . Finally turning back to the old name Chonburi Bluewave. Chonburi have won the 2010, 2011–12, and the 2012-13 Futsal Thailand League.

=== The Greatest in Asia ===
In August 2013, After finishing champions in the 2012 Futsal Thailand League season, Chonburi Bluewave under Pulpis head coach secured direct qualification into the 2013 AFC Futsal Club Championship. In the group stages, for first games The Sharks draw Ardus Tashkent from Uzbekistan, 2–2 beat Giti Pasand, 4-3 and beat Al Sadd, 3–2. For their final leg of the AFC Futsal Club Championship Semi-finals against Chinese side Shenzhen Nanling. Having won, 5–2. In Final The Sharks draw Giti Pasand, 1-1 by 1 goal of Suphawut Thueanklang and the club won 1-4 by penalties after extra time. Suphawut Thueanklang received the most valuable player award.

In July 2017, After finishing champions in the 2016 Futsal Thailand League season, Chonburi Bluewave under Rakphol SaiNetngam head coach secured direct qualification into the 2017 AFC Futsal Club Championship. In the group stages, for first games The Sharks beat Bank of Beirut, 9–0 and beat AGMK from Uzbekistan, 5–0. For their final leg of the AFC Futsal Club Championship Quarter-finals against Japanese side Shriker Osaka. Having won, 4–2. In Semi-finals The Sharks beat Thái Sơn Nam, 6–0. The Sharks beat Giti Pasand, 3–2 in final by hattrick of Suphawut Thueanklang. Jirawat Sornwichian received a Top Scorer award with nine goals.

== Youth Academy ==
PTT Chonburi academy in Bangkok. The club have been sending coaches over to schools to teach kids how to play futsal.

== Trophies ==
=== League ===
- Thailand Futsal League

(gold) Winners (11) : 2006, 2009, 2010, 2011–12, 2012–13, 2014, 2015, 2016, 2017, 2020, 2021-22

=== Cup ===
- Thai Futsal FA Cup

(gold) Winners (5) : 2010, 2011–12, 2014, 2015, 2019

=== International ===
- Intercontinental Futsal Cup

Fourth place (1) : 2018

- AFC Futsal Club Championship

(gold) Winners (2) : 2013, 2017
(silver) Runner-up (1) : 2014
(bronze) Third place (1) : 2016

- AFC futsal team of the year (1): 2013
- AFF Futsal Club Championship

(gold) Winners (2) : 2019, 2021

== Current players ==
Note: Flags indicate national team as defined under FIFA eligibility rules; some limited exceptions apply. Players may hold more than one non-FIFA nationality.

No.	Pos.	Nation	Player
2	GK	THA	Wathanyu Sirirattanapun
4	DF	THA	Krit Arunsanyalak
5	DF	THA	Ronnachai Jungwongsuk
7	MF	THA	Kritsada Wongkaeo (captain)
8	DF	BRA	Marcos Vinícius
10	FW	THA	Warut Wangsama-aeo
11	FW	THA	Muhammad Osamanmusa
12	MF	THA	Nattawut Madyalan (vice-captain)
13	MF	THA	Supakorn Sang-om
14	MF	THA	Supakorn Bowornrachadakul
16	FW	THA	Peerapat Kaewwilai

No.	Pos.	Nation	Player
18	GK	THA	Boriboon Klangkhla
19	MF	THA	Apiwat Chaemcharoen
20	GK	THA	Arut Senbat
24	DF	THA	Sarawut Raungrag
33	MF	THA	Panupong Khampranom
42	GK	THA	Theerawat Keawwilai
77	MF	THA	Panat Kittipanuwong
91	MF	BRA	Raimundo
92	MF	BRA	Airton Oliveira
99	FW	THA	Joseph Khaosard

== Notable former players ==
- 2006-2013 (Thailand) Anucha Munjarern
- 2006-2011 (Thailand) Panuwat Janta
- 2007-2015 (Thailand) Lertchai Issarasuwipakorn
- 2007- (Thailand) Kritsada Wongkaeo
- 2007- (Thailand) Suphawut Thueanklang
- 2015- (Brazil) Xapa

== Asian Competitions Appearances ==
- AFC Futsal Club Championship: 8 appearances

2011: Group stage
2012: Group stage
2013: Champions
2014: Runner-up
2015: Group stage
2016: Third place
2017: Champions
2018: Quarter-final

== Sponsorship ==
Government Housing Bank (G.H. Bank) and Rattana Bundit University are the team's main sponsors.

Period	Sportswear	Sponsor	Title Sponsor
2012—2014	(United States) Nike	Chang Beer	-
2015	(Thailand) Real United	Chang Beer	-
2016	(Thailand) Warrix Sports	Chang Beer	-
2017	(Thailand) Ari	PTT	PTT
2020	(Thailand) ALL ZETT	PTT, Chang Beer, Thai Oil	PTT
2021			Free Fire

== Club officials ==
Position	Name	Ref.
Chairman	(Thailand) Tachapat Benjasiriwan	
Sporting Director	(United States) Benjamin Tuffnell	
Technical Development Director	(Spain) José María Pazos Méndez	
Manager	(Spain) Carlos César Núñez Gago	
Head coach	(Spain) Carlos César Núñez Gago	
Secretary	(Thailand) Narhong Phongsear	
Doctor	(Thailand) khomsan Sangthong	
Club Officer	(Thailand) Khomsan Thaikheing	
Club Officer	(Thailand) Phongpat Phokaew	
Physiotherapist	(Portugal) Alexandre Anholeto	
Marketing director	(Thailand) Thanyachapat Benjasiriwan	
Public Relations Director	(Thailand) Nattawut Khoykaew	
Public Relations Director	(Thailand) Patthawee chulka	

== Crests ==
Chonburi Blue Wave 2006-2009

Chonburi Blue Wave 2012–present

== See also ==
- Chonburi FC

Achievements
Preceded by Giti Pasand Isfahan (Iran)	AFC Futsal Club Championship; 2013 (First title)	Succeeded by Nagoya Oceans (Japan)
Preceded by Nagoya Oceans (Japan)	AFC Futsal Club Championship; 2017 (Second title)	Succeeded by Mes Sungun (Iran)
