= Rajnavy Futsal Club =

Thai futsal club

Rajnavy ราชนาวี
- Thai naval ensign "ธงราชนาวี"
- Full name: Rajnavy Futsal Club สโมสรฟุตซอลราชนาวี
- Nickname(s): Ta Han Nam
- Founded: 2006
- Ground: Bhuti-anan Gymnasium; Bangkok, Thailand
- Capacity: 100
- Chairman: (Thailand)
- Manager: (Thailand)
- League: Futsal Thai League
Home colours	Away colours

Active departments of Royal Thai Navy
Football	Football B	Futsal

Rajnavy Futsal Club (Thai สโมสรฟุตซอลราชนาวี) is a Thai Futsal club. They currently play in the Thailand Futsal League.
