= Surat Thani Futsal Club =

Thai futsal club

Surat Thani สุราษฎร์ธานี
- Full name: Surat Thani Futsal Club สโมสรฟุตซอลสุราษฎร์ธานี
- Nicknames: The Chargers (กุ้งสายฟ้า)
- Founded: 2007
- Ground: Chang Tapee Arena; Surat Thani, Thailand
- Capacity: 4,500
- Chairman: (Thailand) Tan Thuagsuban
- Manager: (Thailand) Pattaya Piamkum
- League: Futsal Thai League
Home colours	Away colours

Surat Thani Futsal Club (Thai สโมสรฟุตซอลสุราษฎร์ธานี) is a Thai Futsal club, nicknamed The Lightning Shrimps and based in Surat Thani Province located in the south of Thailand. The club currently plays in the Thailand Futsal League.

== Players ==
=== Current squad ===
Note: Flags indicate national team as defined under FIFA eligibility rules; some limited exceptions apply. Players may hold more than one non-FIFA nationality.

No.	Pos.	Nation	Player
1		THA	Kanin Srichand
3		THA	Watchara Laisri
4		THA	Jakkarin Pisutthiphan
5		THA	Pugun Dongdung
8		BRA	Rosencler De Carvalho Junior
9		THA	Nakhon Kidhen
10		THA	Natthawut Kongnimitr
12		THA	Namthang Ngowcharoenpaisan
13		THA	Vitoon Thapinna
14		THA	Pornthep Sonamitr

No.	Pos.	Nation	Player
17		THA	Sikarin Modewongwai
18		THA	Voratas Chantharuek
19		THA	Apichart Nonsuebphao
21		BRA	Felipe Costa Santos
22		THA	Peerapol Tagimnok
24		THA	Adisak Chulee
25	GK	THA	Kompol Pipop
27		THA	Sumin Booncharoen
28		THA	Kittipong Phochai
—	MF	THA	Tairong Petchtiam
