= Futsal Thai League =

Thai futsal club league

- Logo used since 2016
- Founded: 2006; 20 years ago
- Country: Thailand
- Confederation: AFC
- Number of clubs: 14
- Level on pyramid: 1
- Relegation to: Division 1
- Domestic cup: Thai FA Futsal Cup
- International cup(s): AFC Futsal Club Championship; AFF Futsal Club Championship
- Current champions: Hongyen Thakam (3rd title) (2025)
- Most championships: Chonburi Bluewave (11 titles)
- Broadcaster(s): TrueVisions
- Website: Official website
- Current: 2026

The Futsal Thai League (Thai: ฟุตซอล ไทยลีก) is the top league for futsal clubs in Thailand. It is sponsored by MEA and therefore officially known as the MEA Futsal Thai League.

== Sponsorship ==
The Futsal Thai League has been sponsored since 2006/07, 2010-2012 and has been sponsored again since 2016. The sponsor has been able to determine the league's sponsorship name. The list below details who the sponsors have been and what they called the competition:

- 2006/07: TOT (TOT Thailand Futsal League)
- 2007/08–2009: None (Thailand Futsal League)
- 2010–2012/13: UNIVERSAL SPORT MANAGEMENT (USM Thailand Futsal League)
- 2014–2015/16: None (Futsal Thailand Premier League)
- 2016–2019 : AIS (AIS Futsal Thailand League)
- 2020–2023 : None (Futsal ThaiLeague)
- 2024–Present : MEA (MEA Futsal Thai League)

== Clubs ==
There are 14 clubs in the league, with one promoted teams from Futsal Thai League Division 1

=== Current clubs ===
Note: Table lists in alphabetical order.

Team	Province	Stadium	Capacity
Bangkok FC	Bangkok (Min Buri)	72nd Anniversary Min Buri Stadium	4,000
Black Pearl United	prachuap khiri khan	Imane stadium	
Chonburi Bluewave	Chonburi (Mueang)	Bluewave Arena	3,000
Rajnavy	Bangkok (Bang Na)	Bhuti-anan Gymnasium	500
Thammasat Stallion	Pathum Thani		
Surat Thani	Surat Thani (Mueang)	Chang Tapee Arena	4,500
Hongyen Thakam	Samut Sakhon		
Kasembundit	Bangkok (Min Buri)	KBU Sports Complex	500
Nonthaburi	Nonthaburi (Bang Bua Thong)	Lumpo Stadium	500
Phetchaburi Rajabhat	Phetchaburi		
Port	Bangkok (Khlong Toei)	Kodang Stadium	1,000
Phuket united	Phuket		
Nakhonpathom christian united			
JT Truck Nakhonratchasima			

== Championship history ==
Season	Winner	Runner up	Third place
2006	Chonburi Bluewave	TOT	I Am Sport
2007	Port	Chonburi Bluewave	CAT Telecom
2009	Chonburi Bluewave	CAT Telecom	I Am Sport
2010	Chonburi Bluewave	Port	CAT Telecom
2011–12	Chonburi Bluewave	Lampang United	Port
2012–13	Chonburi Bluewave	Port	Sripatum Sunlite Sisaket
2014	Chonburi Bluewave	Port	Rajnavy
2015	Chonburi Bluewave	Bangkok BTS	Port
2016	Chonburi Bluewave	Port	Bangkok BTS
2017	Chonburi Bluewave	Port	Bangkok BTS
2018	Port	Chonburi Bluewave	Surat Thani
2019	Port	Chonburi Bluewave	Surat Thani
2020	Chonburi Bluewave	Port	CAT Telecom
2021–22	Chonburi Bluewave	Hongyen Thakam	Bangkok BTS
2022	Port	Hongyen Thakam	Black Pearl United
2023	Hongyen Thakam	Black Pearl United	Chonburi Bluewave
2024	Hongyen Thakam	Port	Chonburi Bluewave
2025	Hongyen Thakam	Port	Thammasat Stallion

Club	Winners	Winning seasons
Chonburi Bluewave	11	
Port	4	
Hongyen Thakam	3	

== Broadcast ==
Year	TV
2016	Thairath TV
2023/24	
2024	T Sports 7
2025	TrueVisions

== See also ==
- Thailand national futsal team
- Football records in Thailand
