= 2024 Copa Libertadores de Futsal =

Copa CONMEBOL Libertadores de Futsal Argentina 2024

Tournament details
- Host country: Argentina
- Cities: Tortuguitas, Buenos Aires
- Dates: 19–26 May 2024
- Teams: 12 (from 10 associations)
- Venue: 1 (in 1 host city)

Final positions
- Champions: (Brazil) Magnus Futsal (2nd title)
- Runners-up: (Argentina) Barracas Central
- Third place: (Uruguay) Peñarol
- Fourth place: (Colombia) Independiente Barranquilla

Tournament statistics
- Matches played: 32
- Goals scored: 157 (4.91 per match)

The 2024 Copa CONMEBOL Libertadores de Futsal was the 23rd edition of the Copa Libertadores de Futsal, South America's premier club futsal tournament organized by CONMEBOL. The tournament was held in Tortuguitas, Buenos Aires Province, Argentina between 19 and 26 May 2024.

Cascavel were the two-time defending champions but failed to retain the title after being eliminated in the quarter-finals. Magnus Futsal won its second title (the first was in 2015 under the name Brasil Kirin) after beating Barracas Central 4–2 in the final.

== Teams ==
The competition will contested by 12 teams: the title holders, one entry from each of the ten CONMEBOL associations, plus an additional entry from the host association.

Association	Team	Qualification method
Argentina (hosts)	San Lorenzo (Argentina 1)	2023 Torneo de Primera División de Futsal champions.
Argentina (hosts)	Barracas Central (Argentina 2)	2023 Liga Nacional de Futsal champions.
Bolivia	Morales Moralitos	2023 Liga Nacional de Futsal champions.
Brazil	Cascavel (holders)	2023 Copa Libertadores de Futsal champions.
Brazil	Magnus Futsal	2024 Supercopa de Futsal champions.
Chile	Santiago Wanderers	2023 Campeonato Nacional de Fútbol Sala Torneos Apertura and Clausura champions.
Colombia	Independiente Barranquilla	2024 Superliga Futsal FCF champions.
Ecuador	Bocca	2022 Liga Nacional de Futsal Serie A champions.
Paraguay	Cerro Porteño	2023 Liga Premium de Futsal champions.
Peru	Panta Walon	2023 Primera División Futsal Pro champions.
Uruguay	Peñarol	2023 Campeonato Uruguayo de Fútbol Sala champions.
Venezuela	Centauros	2023 Liga FUTVE Futsal 1 champions.

Notes

1. Chile (CHI): Santiago Wanderers qualified for the 2024 Copa Libertadores by winning both the Apertura and Clausura tournaments of the 2023 Campeonato Nacional de Fútbol Sala. The Chile berth was planned to be awarded to the winners of a single match called Copa de Campeones between the Apertura and Clausura winners, unless one team wins both tournaments.

=== Squads ===
Each team had to enter a squad of a maximum of 14 and a minimum of 9 players, including at least two goalkeepers (Regulations Article 48).

== Venue ==
The tournament will be entirely played at the Arena Tortuguitas, also known as DirecTV Arena, located in the city of Tortuguitas in Malvinas Argentinas Partido, Greater Buenos Aires. The Arena Tortuguitas has a capacity of 13,500 people seated and up to a total of 15,000 spectators.

== Draw ==
The draw for the groups composition was held on 2 May 2024, 12:00 PYT (UTC−4), at the CONMEBOL headquarters in Luque, Paraguay. The draw was conducted based on Regulations Article 16 as follows:

Initially, three teams were seeded and assigned to the head of the groups (Cascavel automatically to Group A, the others two via a draw from pot 1):

- To Group A: as 2023 Copa Libertadores champions, Cascavel (Brazil)
- To Group B: as the first representative of the host association, San Lorenzo (Argentina)
- To Group C: as the representative of the champion national association of the 2022 Copa Libertadores, Magnus Futsal (Brazil)

The remaining nine teams were split into three pots of three based on the final placement of their national association's club in the previous edition of the championship, with the highest three (Venezuela, Ecuador and Peru) placed in Pot 2, the next three (Uruguay, Paraguay and Bolivia) placed in Pot 3 and the lowest two (Colombia and Chile) in pot 4, alongside the additional Argentine team.

Pot 1 (seeds)	Pot 2	Pot 3	Pot 4
(Argentina) San Lorenzo; (Brazil) Magnus Futsal	(Venezuela) Centauros; (Ecuador) Bocca; (Peru) Panta Walon	(Uruguay) Peñarol; (Paraguay) Cerro Porteño; (Bolivia) Morales Moralitos	(Colombia) Independiente Barranquilla; (Chile) Santiago Wanderers; (Argentina) Barracas Central

From each pot (except pot 1), the first team drawn was placed into Group A, the second team drawn placed into Group B and the final team drawn placed into Group C. Teams from the same national association could not be drawn into the same group.

The draw resulted in the following groups:

Group A
Pos	Team
A1	(Brazil) Cascavel
A2	(Venezuela) Centauros
A3	(Paraguay) Cerro Porteño
A4	(Argentina) Barracas Central

Group B
Pos	Team
B1	(Argentina) San Lorenzo
B2	(Peru) Panta Walon
B3	(Bolivia) Morales Moralitos
B4	(Colombia) Independiente Barranquilla

Group C
Pos	Team
C1	(Brazil) Magnus Futsal
C2	(Ecuador) Bocca
C3	(Uruguay) Peñarol
C4	(Chile) Santiago Wanderers

== Match officials ==
On 30 April 2024, CONMEBOL announced the referees appointed for the tournament by its Referees Commission.

Association	Referees
Argentina	Andrés Pena García, Lautaro Romero and Estefania Pinto
Bolivia	Henry Gutiérrez and Alfredo Gutiérrez
Brazil	Ricardo Messa, Anelize Schulz and Alfredo Wagner
Chile	Christian Espíndola and Valeria Palma
Colombia	Yuri García and Daniel Manrique
Ecuador	Jonathan Herbas and Jaime Jativa
Paraguay	Bill Villalba and Feliciano Fariña
Peru	Rolly Rojas and Ulises Ureta
Uruguay	Daniel Rodríguez and Federico Piccardo
Venezuela	Oriana Zambrano and Félix Rumbos

== Group stage ==
The top two teams of each group and the two best third-placed teams advance to the quarter-finals.

Tiebreakers

Teams are ranked according to points earned (3 points for a win, 1 point for a draw, 0 points for a loss). If tied on points, tiebreakers are applied in the following order (Regulations Article 21):

1. Results in head-to-head matches between tied teams (points, goal difference, goals scored);
2. Goal difference in all matches;
3. Goals scored in all matches;
4. Fewest number of red cards received;
5. Fewest number of yellow cards received;
6. Drawing of lots.

All kick-off times are local times, ART (UTC−3), as listed by CONMEBOL.

=== Group A ===
Pos	Team	Pld	W	D	L	GF	GA	GD	Pts	Qualification
1	(Argentina) Barracas Central (H)	3	2	1	0	10	5	+5	7	Quarter-finals
2	(Brazil) Cascavel	3	2	1	0	8	3	+5	7	Quarter-finals
3	(Venezuela) Centauros	3	1	0	2	4	7	−3	3	Quarter-finals
4	(Paraguay) Cerro Porteño	3	0	0	3	7	14	−7	0	Eleventh place play-off

Source: CONMEBOL
Rules for classification: Group stage tiebreakers
(H) Hosts
19 May 2024
10:00

Centauros (Venezuela)	3–2	(Paraguay) Cerro Porteño
Saimond Francia 8'; Maikel Torres 19'; Victor Carreño 29'	Report	Pedro Pascottini 2'; Jorge Espinoza 9'

Arena Tortuguitas, Tortuguitas
Referee: Christian Espíndola (Chile)
19 May 2024
18:00

Cascavel (Brazil)	1–1	(Argentina) Barracas Central
Maicon 10'	Report	Ángel Claudino 3'

Arena Tortuguitas, Tortuguitas
Referee: Daniel Rodríguez (Uruguay)

20 May 2024
14:00

Cerro Porteño (Paraguay)	2–5	(Brazil) Cascavel
Pedro Pascottini 26', 38'	Report	Vitinho 8'; Ernandes 29'; Vandinho 34'; Jonatha 35'; Carlão 36'

Arena Tortuguitas, Tortuguitas
Referee: Daniel Manrique (Colombia)
20 May 2024
20:00

Centauros (Venezuela)	1–3	(Argentina) Barracas Central
Carlos Sanz 28'	Report	Kevin Arrieta 7', 19'; Marcos González 15'

Arena Tortuguitas, Tortuguitas
Referee: Yuri García (Colombia)

21 May 2024
16:00

Cascavel (Brazil)	2–0	(Venezuela) Centauros
Jonatha 15'; Michun 16'	Report

Arena Tortuguitas, Tortuguitas
Referee: Henrry Gutiérrez (Bolivia)
21 May 2024
18:00

Barracas Central (Argentina)	6–3	(Paraguay) Cerro Porteño
Facundo Fontanella 4'; Walter Toscano 13'; Gabriel Ramírez 14'; Ángel Claudinho 32', 33'; Alejo Gayraud 40'	Report	Pedro Pascottini 2', 31'; Jorge Espinoza 18'

Arena Tortuguitas, Tortuguitas
Referee: Daniel Rodríguez (Uruguay)

=== Group B ===
Pos	Team	Pld	W	D	L	GF	GA	GD	Pts	Qualification
1	(Peru) Panta Walon	3	3	0	0	7	2	+5	9	Quarter-finals
2	(Argentina) San Lorenzo (H)	3	2	0	1	5	3	+2	6	Quarter-finals
3	(Colombia) Independiente Barranquilla	3	1	0	2	11	8	+3	3	Quarter-finals
4	(Bolivia) Morales Moralitos	3	0	0	3	2	12	−10	0	Eleventh place play-off

Source: CONMEBOL
Rules for classification: Group stage tiebreakers
(H) Hosts
19 May 2024
16:00

Panta Walon (Peru)	2–1	(Bolivia) Morales Moralitos
Alfredo Vidal 18', 32'	Report	Joel Guzmán 13'

Arena Tortuguitas, Tortuguitas
Referee: Bill Villalba (Paraguay)
19 May 2024
20:00

San Lorenzo (Argentina)	3–2	(Colombia) Independiente Barranquilla
Matías Block 7', 33'; Gerardo Menzeguez 32'	Report	José Hernández 25'; José Gutiérrez 30'

Arena Tortuguitas, Tortuguitas
Referee: Alfredo Wagner (Brazil)

20 May 2024
16:00

Panta Walon (Peru)	4–1	(Colombia) Independiente Barranquilla
Alfredo Vidal 17'; Jordi Rivera 37'; Xavier Tavera 37'; Jesús Herrera 39'	Report	Eduardo Medina 16'

Arena Tortuguitas, Tortuguitas
Referee: Ricardo Messa (Brazil)
20 May 2024
18:00

Morales Moralitos (Bolivia)	0–2	(Argentina) San Lorenzo
	Report	Agustín Del Rey 13'; Thomas Baisel 39'

Arena Tortuguitas, Tortuguitas
Referee: Feliciano Fariña (Paraguay)

21 May 2024
14:00

Independiente Barranquilla (Colombia)	8–1	(Bolivia) Morales Moralitos
José Quiróz 7'; Freddy Grajeda 8' (o.g.); Jhonny Ramírez 12'; Brayan Guette 14', 38'; José Gutiérrez 19'; Leynner Pérez 28'; Jorge Cuervo 39'	Report	Iván Flores 40'

Arena Tortuguitas, Tortuguitas
Referee: Jonathan Herbas (Ecuador)
21 May 2024
20:00

San Lorenzo (Argentina)	0–1	(Peru) Panta Walon
	Report	Luis Ramos 5'

Arena Tortuguitas, Tortuguitas
Referee: Anelize Schulz (Brazil)

=== Group C ===
Pos	Team	Pld	W	D	L	GF	GA	GD	Pts	Qualification
1	(Brazil) Magnus Futsal	3	3	0	0	14	3	+11	9	Quarter-finals
2	(Uruguay) Peñarol	3	1	1	1	10	6	+4	4	Quarter-finals
3	(Chile) Santiago Wanderers	3	1	0	2	4	13	−9	3	Ninth place play-off
4	(Ecuador) Bocca	3	0	1	2	5	11	−6	1	Ninth place play-off

Source: CONMEBOL
Rules for classification: Group stage tiebreakers
19 May 2024
12:00

Magnus Futsal (Brazil)	4–1	(Chile) Santiago Wanderers
Lino 6'; Charuto 16'; Mendoça 32'; Rodrigo 39'	Report	Fabián Vázquez 9'

Arena Tortuguitas, Tortuguitas
Referee: Lautaro Romero (Argentina)
19 May 2024
14:00

Bocca (Ecuador)	2–2	(Uruguay) Peñarol
Eddie León 13', 16'	Report	Ramiro Caresani 1'; Brandon Díaz 36'

Arena Tortuguitas, Tortuguitas
Referee: Andrés Pena García (Argentina)

20 May 2024
10:00

Peñarol (Uruguay)	1–4	(Brazil) Magnus Futsal
Maximiliano Navarro 10'	Report	Joazinho 18', 28'; Lino 33'; Charuto 39'

Arena Tortuguitas, Tortuguitas
Referee: Rolly Rojas (Peru)
20 May 2024
12:00

Bocca (Ecuador)	2–3	(Chile) Santiago Wanderers
Alejandro Nazareno 6'; Agustín Cafure 20'	Report	Fabián Vásquez 10', 40'; Diego Jara 27'

Arena Tortuguitas, Tortuguitas
Referee: Henrry Gutiérrez (Bolivia)

21 May 2024
10:00

Magnus Futsal (Brazil)	6–1	(Ecuador) Bocca
Kelvin 4'; Charuto 16', 19'; Elisandro 23'; Carlinhos 28'; Gabriel 32'	Report	Mauro Sánchez 36'

Arena Tortuguitas, Tortuguitas
Referee: Estefanía Pinto (Argentina)
21 May 2024
12:00

Santiago Wanderers (Chile)	0–7	(Uruguay) Peñarol
	Report	Lucas Paroldo 5'; Maximiliano Navarro 17'; Manuel Suazo 23', 28'; Alejandro Aunchayna 33'; Jesús Viamonte 37'; Toni Alvarado 39'

Arena Tortuguitas, Tortuguitas
Referee: Yuri García (Colombia)

=== Ranking of third-placed teams ===
Pos	Grp	Team	Pld	W	D	L	GF	GA	GD	Pts	Qualification
1	B	(Colombia) Independiente Barranquilla	3	1	0	2	11	8	+3	3	Quarter-finals
2	A	(Venezuela) Centauros	3	1	0	2	4	7	−3	3	Quarter-finals
3	C	(Chile) Santiago Wanderers	3	1	0	2	4	13	−9	3	Ninth place play-off

Source: CONMEBOL
Rules for classification: 1) Points; 2) Goal difference; 3) Goals scored; 4) Fewest number of red cards received; 5) Fewest number of yellow cards received; 6) Draw.

=== Ranking of fourth-placed teams ===
Pos	Grp	Team	Pld	W	D	L	GF	GA	GD	Pts	Qualification
1	C	(Ecuador) Bocca	3	0	1	2	5	11	−6	1	Ninth place play-off
2	A	(Paraguay) Cerro Porteño	3	0	0	3	7	14	−7	0	Eleventh place play-off
3	B	(Bolivia) Morales Moralitos	3	0	0	3	2	12	−10	0	Eleventh place play-off

Source: CONMEBOL
Rules for classification: 1) Points; 2) Goal difference; 3) Goals scored; 4) Fewest number of red cards received; 5) Fewest number of yellow cards received; 6) Draw.

== Final stage ==
In the quarter-finals, semi-finals and final, extra time and penalty shoot-out would be used to decide the winner if necessary (no extra time would be used in the play-offs for third to twelfth place) (Regulations Article 22).

For the final stage, CONMEBOL implemented the use of the video assistant referee (VAR) for the first time in the tournament. It was the second CONMEBOL futsal competition to make use of VAR after the 2024 Copa América de Futsal.

All kick-off times are local times, ART (UTC−3), as listed by CONMEBOL.

=== Bracket ===
The quarter-final matchups are:

- QF1: Winner Group A vs. 2nd Best Third Place
- QF2: Winner Group B vs. 1st Best Third Place
- QF3: Winner Group C vs. Runner-up Group A
- QF4: Runner-up Group B vs. Runner-up Group C

The semi-final matchups are:

- SF1: Winner QF1 vs. Winner QF4
- SF2: Winner QF2 vs. Winner QF3

5th place match
25 May
(Venezuela) Centauros	1
(Brazil) Cascavel	2
7th place match
25 May
(Argentina) San Lorenzo	1
(Peru) Panta Walon	5

5th–8th place semi-finals
24 May
(Venezuela) Centauros	4
(Argentina) San Lorenzo	2
24 May
(Peru) Panta Walon	0
(Brazil) Cascavel	2

Quarter-finals
23 May
(Argentina) Barracas Central	2
(Venezuela) Centauros	1
23 May
(Argentina) San Lorenzo	0
(Uruguay) Peñarol	3
23 May
(Peru) Panta Walon	2
(Colombia) Independiente Barranquilla (a.e.t.)	3
23 May
(Brazil) Magnus Futsal	3
(Brazil) Cascavel	2

Semi-finals
25 May
(Argentina) Barracas Central	5
(Uruguay) Peñarol	2
25 May
(Colombia) Independiente Barranquilla	0
(Brazil) Magnus Futsal	5

Final
26 May
(Argentina) Barracas Central	2
(Brazil) Magnus Futsal	4
3rd place match
26 May
(Uruguay) Peñarol	3
(Colombia) Independiente Barranquilla	1

11th place match
24 May
(Paraguay) Cerro Porteño	8
(Bolivia) Morales Moralitos	2

9th place match
24 May
(Chile) Santiago Wanderers	4
(Ecuador) Bocca	1

=== Quarter-finals ===
23 May 2023
12:00

Panta Walon (Peru)	2–3 (a.e.t.)	(Colombia) Independiente Barranquilla
Jordi Rivera 4'; Hugo Barrantes 8'	Report	José Gutiérrez 26'; José Hernández 32'; Leynner Pérez 49'

Arena Tortuguitas, Tortuguitas
Referee: Henrry Gutiérrez (Bolivia)

23 May 2023
14:30

Magnus Futsal (Brazil)	3–2	(Brazil) Cascavel
Elisandro 15', 30'; Charuto 39'	Report	Maicon 15'; Ernandes 21'

Arena Tortuguitas, Tortuguitas
Referee: Daniel Rodríguez (Uruguay)

23 May 2023
17:00

San Lorenzo (Argentina)	0–3	(Uruguay) Peñarol
	Report	Maximiliano Navarro 9'; Lucas Paroldo 11'; Brandon Díaz 31'

Arena Tortuguitas, Tortuguitas
Referee: Christian Espíndola (Chile)

23 May 2023
19:30

Barracas Central (Argentina)	2–1	(Venezuela) Centauros
Facundo Fontanella 37'; Sergio Nieto 37'	Report	Maikel Torres 23'

Arena Tortuguitas, Tortuguitas
Referee: Bill Villalba (Paraguay)

=== Semi-finals ===
==== 5th–8th place ====
24 May 2023
16:00

Panta Walon (Peru)	0–2	(Brazil) Cascavel
		Carlão 3', 35'

Arena Tortuguitas, Tortuguitas
Referee: Federico Piccardo (Uruguay)

24 May 2023
18:00

Centauros (Venezuela)	4–2	(Argentina) San Lorenzo
Kevin Briceño 4'; Carlos Vento 11', 11'; Tomás Bazán 28' (o.g.)		Agustín Del Rey 33'; Enzo Báez 36'

Arena Tortuguitas, Tortuguitas
Referee: Alfredo Wagner (Brazil)

==== 1st–4th place ====
25 May 2023
17:00

Independiente Barranquilla (Colombia)	0–5	(Brazil) Magnus Futsal
	Report	Leandro Lino 11'; Joãozinho 14'; Mendoça 19'; Rodrigo 19'; Pepita 36'

Arena Tortuguitas, Tortuguitas
Referee: Christian Espíndola (Chile)

25 May 2023
19:30

Barracas Central (Argentina)	5–2	(Uruguay) Peñarol
Alejo Gayraud 4', 25'; Franco Pedrazzini 12', 19'; Facundo Fontanella 34'	Report	Jesús Viamonte 26'; Nicolás Ordoqui 37'

Arena Tortuguitas, Tortuguitas
Referee: Henrry Gutiérrez (Bolivia)

=== Finals ===
==== 11th place match ====
24 May 2023
12:00

Cerro Porteño (Paraguay)	8–2	(Bolivia) Morales Moralitos
Juan Arando 2' (o.g.); Pedro Pascottini 4', 6', 16', 32'; Enrique Areco 18', 19'; Andy Ledezma 26'		Andy Ledezma 7'; José Guerrero 40'

Arena Tortuguitas, Tortuguitas
Referee: Félix Rumbos (Venezuela)

==== 9th place match ====
24 May 2023
14:00

Santiago Wanderers (Chile)	4–1	(Ecuador) Bocca
Joshua Barrios 11'; Francisco Soto 14', 37'; Gonzalo Valdebenito 19' (pen.)		Agustín Cafure 10'

Arena Tortuguitas, Tortuguitas
Referee: Ricardo Messa (Brazil)

==== 7th place match ====
25 May 2023
12:00

San Lorenzo (Argentina)	1–5	(Peru) Panta Walon
Gerardo Menzeguez 37' (pen.)	Report	Enmanuel Gamboa 5'; Hugo Barrantes 10'; Jordi Rivera 10'; Alfonso Maquensi 34'; Xavier Tavera 33'

Arena Tortuguitas, Tortuguitas
Referee: Anelize Schulz (Brazil)

==== 5th place match ====
25 May 2023
14:30

Centauros (Venezuela)	1–2	(Brazil) Cascavel
Vandinho 28' (o.g.)	Report	Carlos Vásquez 26' (o.g.); Otanha 31'

Arena Tortuguitas, Tortuguitas
Referee: Estefanía Pinto (Argentina)

==== 3rd place match ====
26 May 2023
15:00

Peñarol (Uruguay)	3–1	(Colombia) Independiente Barranquilla
Brandon Díaz 2'; Ramiro Caresani 12'; Manuel Suazo 32'	Report	Jhonny Ramírez 32'

Arena Tortuguitas, Tortuguitas
Referee: Alfredo Wagner (Brazil)

==== Final ====
26 May 2023
18:00

Barracas Central (Argentina)	2–4	(Brazil) Magnus Futsal
Sergio Neto 30'; Brian Burgo 37'	Report	Charuto 8', 39'; Pepita 22'; Rodrigo 33'

Arena Tortuguitas, Tortuguitas
Referee: Daniel Rodríguez (Uruguay)

== Final ranking ==
Rank	Team
1st place, gold medalist(s)	(Brazil) Magnus Futsal
2nd place, silver medalist(s)	(Argentina) Barracas Central
3rd place, bronze medalist(s)	(Uruguay) Peñarol
4	(Colombia) Independiente Barranquilla
5	(Brazil) Cascavel
6	(Venezuela) Centauros
7	(Peru) Panta Walon
8	(Argentina) San Lorenzo
9	(Chile) Santiago Wanderers
10	(Ecuador) Bocca
11	(Paraguay) Cerro Porteño
12	(Bolivia) Morales Moralitos

=== Top scorers ===
As of May 21.

Rank	Player	Team	Goals
1	(Paraguay) Pedro Pascottini	(Paraguay) Cerro Porteño	5
2	(Brazil) Charles Ferreira	(Brazil) Magnus Futsal	4
3	(Argentina) Angel Claudino	(Argentina) Barracas Central	3
3	(Chile) Fabián Vasquez	(Chile) Santiago Wanderers	3
3	(Venezuela) Alfredo Vidal	(Peru) Panta Walon	3
