= 2025 Copa Libertadores de Futsal =

Copa CONMEBOL Libertadores de Futsal Paraguay 2025

Tournament details
- Host country: Paraguay
- City: Luque
- Dates: 25 May – 1 June
- Teams: 12 (from 10 associations)
- Venue: 1 (in 1 host city)

Final positions
- Champions: (Uruguay) Peñarol (1st title)
- Runners-up: (Brazil) Magnus Futsal
- Third place: (Brazil) Joinville
- Fourth place: (Venezuela) Centauros

Tournament statistics
- Matches played: 32
- Goals scored: 142 (4.44 per match)

The 2025 Copa CONMEBOL Libertadores de Futsal was the 24th edition of the Copa Libertadores de Futsal, South America's premier club futsal tournament organized by CONMEBOL. It was held in Luque, Paraguay from 25 May to 1 June 2025.

Originally planned to be held from 11 to 18 May 2025, the tournament dates were eventually moved up by two weeks.

Magnus Futsal were the defending champions but failed to retain the title after losing 3–1 in the final to Peñarol. In this way, Peñarol are the first Uruguayan side to reach the title and the third non-Brazilian team to achieve it, after Paraguayan side Cerro Porteño in 2016 and Argentine side San Lorenzo in 2021.

== Teams ==
The competition was contested by 12 teams: the title holders, one entry from each of the ten CONMEBOL associations, plus an additional entry from the host association.

| Association | Team | Qualification method |
|---|---|---|
| Argentina | 17 de Agosto | 2025 Copa Libertadores qualification play-off winners. |
| Bolivia | Morales Moralitos | 2024 Liga Nacional de Futsal champions. |
| Brazil | Magnus Futsal (holders) | 2024 Copa Libertadores de Futsal champions. |
| Brazil | Joinville | 2024 Supercopa de Futsal champions. |
| Chile | Colo-Colo | 2024 Copa de Campeones champions. |
| Colombia | Sabaneros | 2025 Superliga Futsal FCF champions. |
| Ecuador | Divino Niño | 2024 Liga Nacional de Futsal Serie A champions. |
| Paraguay (hosts) | Cerro Porteño | 2024 Liga Premium de Futsal champions. |
| Paraguay (hosts) | AFEMEC | 2024 Liga Premium de Futsal runners-up. |
| Peru | Universitario | 2024 Primera División Futsal Pro champions. |
| Uruguay | Peñarol | 2024 Campeonato Uruguayo de Fútbol Sala champions. |
| Venezuela | Centauros | 2024 Liga FUTVE Futsal 1 champions. |

Notes

1. Argentina (ARG): The Argentina berth was decided in a play-off played between the 2024 Campeonato de Primera División champions (17 de Agosto) and the 2024 Liga Nacional de Futsal champions (Pinocho).
2. Chile (CHI): The Chile berth was awarded to the winners of the Copa de Campeones, a final playoff match of the 2024 Campeonato Nacional de Fútbol Sala between the Apertura (Santiago Wanderers) and Clausura (Colo-Colo) champions.

=== Squads ===
Each team had to enter a squad of a minimum of 9 and a maximum of 14 players, including at least two goalkeepers (Regulations Article 50).

== Venue ==
| Luque | Location of the host city. |
| COP Arena | Location of the host city. |
| Capacity: 3,300 | Location of the host city. |

Paraguay was announced as host country for the tournament by the CONMEBOL President Alejandro Domínguez during a CONMEBOL Council meeting held on 10 April 2024. This is the fifth time that Paraguay host the tournament after the 2005, 2011, 2015 and 2016 editions.

All matches took place at the COP Arena – Estadio Óscar Harrison, located within the Parque Olímpico sports complex in Luque. Polideportivo Sol de América and Complejo Deportivo "Esc. Luis María Zubizarreta" were selected as training venues.

== Draw ==
The draw for the groups composition was held on 11 Abril 2025, 15:00 PYT (UTC−3), at the CONMEBOL headquarters in Luque, Paraguay. The draw was conducted based on Regulations Article 16 as follows:

Initially, three teams were seeded and assigned to the head of the groups (Magnus Futsal automatically to Group A, the others two via a draw from pot 1):

- To Group A: as 2024 Copa Libertadores champions, Magnus Futsal (Brazil)
- To Group B: as the first representative of the host association, Cerro Porteño (Paraguay)
- To Group C: as the representative of the champion national association of the 2024 Copa Libertadores, Joinville (Brazil)

The remaining nine teams were split into three pots of three based on the final placement of their national association's club in the previous edition of the championship, with the highest three (Argentina, Uruguay and Colombia) placed in Pot 2, the next three (Venezuela, Peru and Chile) placed in Pot 3 and the lowest two (Ecuador and Bolivia) in pot 4, alongside the additional Paraguayan team.

| Pot 1 (seeds) | Pot 2 | Pot 3 | Pot 4 |
|---|---|---|---|
| (Paraguay) Cerro Porteño; (Brazil) Joinville | (Argentina) 17 de Agosto; (Uruguay) Peñarol; (Colombia) Sabaneros | (Venezuela) Centauros; (Peru) Universitario; (Chile) Colo-Colo | (Ecuador) Divino Niño; (Bolivia) Morales Moralitos; (Paraguay) AFEMEC |

From each pot (except pot 1), the first team drawn was placed into Group A, the second team drawn placed into Group B and the final team drawn placed into Group C. Teams from the same national association could not be drawn into the same group.

The draw resulted in the following groups:

Group A
| Pos | Team |
|---|---|
| A1 | (Brazil) Magnus Futsal |
| A2 | (Colombia) Sabaneros |
| A3 | (Chile) Colo-Colo |
| A4 | (Paraguay) AFEMEC |

Group B
| Pos | Team |
|---|---|
| B1 | (Paraguay) Cerro Porteño |
| B2 | (Argentina) 17 de Agosto |
| B3 | (Venezuela) Centauros |
| B4 | (Ecuador) Divino Niño |

Group C
| Pos | Team |
|---|---|
| C1 | (Brazil) Joinville |
| C2 | (Uruguay) Peñarol |
| C3 | (Peru) Universitario |
| C4 | (Bolivia) Morales Moralitos |

== Match officials ==
On 7 May 2025, CONMEBOL announced the referees appointed for the tournament.

| Association | Referees |
|---|---|
| Argentina | Lautaro Romero and Fausto Vigano |
| Bolivia | Jhilber Choque and Henry Gutiérrez |
| Brazil | Ricardo Messa and Alfredo Wagner |
| Chile | Camilo Riquelme and Marcelo Lagos |
| Colombia | Daniel Manrique, Yuri García and Rolando Bermúdez |
| Ecuador | Jonathan Herbas and Jaime Jativa |
| Paraguay | Bill Villalba and Carlos Martínez |
| Peru | Rolly Rojas and Ulises Ureta |
| Uruguay | Daniel Rodríguez and Federico Piccardo |
| Venezuela | Linderman Bruzuela and Jesús Chinchilla |

== Group stage ==
The top two teams of each group and the two best third-placed teams advanced to the quarter-finals.

Tiebreakers

Teams were ranked according to points earned (3 points for a win, 1 point for a draw, 0 points for a loss). If tied on points, tiebreakers were applied in the following order (Regulations Article 24):

1. Results in head-to-head matches between tied teams (points, goal difference, goals scored);
2. Goal difference in all matches;
3. Goals scored in all matches;
4. Fewest number of red cards received;
5. Fewest number of yellow cards received;
6. Drawing of lots.

All kick-off times are local times, PYT (UTC−3), as listed by CONMEBOL.

=== Group A ===
| Pos | Team | Pld | W | D | L | GF | GA | GD | Pts | Qualification |
|---|---|---|---|---|---|---|---|---|---|---|
| 1 | (Brazil) Magnus Futsal | 3 | 3 | 0 | 0 | 21 | 3 | +18 | 9 | Quarter-finals |
| 2 | (Colombia) Sabaneros | 3 | 2 | 0 | 1 | 5 | 3 | +2 | 6 | Quarter-finals |
| 3 | (Chile) Colo-Colo | 3 | 1 | 0 | 2 | 7 | 13 | −6 | 3 | Ninth place play-off |
| 4 | (Paraguay) AFEMEC (H) | 3 | 0 | 0 | 3 | 5 | 19 | −14 | 0 | Eleventh place play-off |

Source: CONMEBOL
Rules for classification: Group stage tiebreakers
(H) Hosts
25 May 2025
14:00

| Sabaneros (Colombia) | 3–0 | (Chile) Colo-Colo |
|---|---|---|
| Jeiner Galindo (1T); Jorge Ospino (2T); Yeiner Monterroza (2T) | APF report |

COP Arena, Luque
Referee: Henry Gutiérrez (Bolivia)
25 May 2025
16:00

| Magnus Futsal (Brazil) | 12–1 | (Paraguay) AFEMEC |
|---|---|---|
| Diego da Silva (1T); Genaro Soares (1T); Gabriel Andrade (1T); João de Moraes (1T); Carlos Augusto (1T); Leonardo Periano (1T); Rodrigo Hardy (1T); Felipe Silva (2T) | APF report | Gonzalo Agüero (2T) |

COP Arena, Luque
Referee: Lautaro Romero (Argentina)

26 May 2025
14:00

| Sabaneros (Colombia) | 1–0 | (Paraguay) AFEMEC |
|---|---|---|
| Cristian Escobar (1T) | APF report |

COP Arena, Luque
Referee: Andrés Pena García (Argentina)
26 May 2025
16:00

| Colo-Colo (Chile) | 1–6 | (Brazil) Magnus Futsal |
|---|---|---|
| Diego López (1T) | APF report | Diego da Silva (1T); Gabriel Andrade (1T); Bruno Andrade (1T); Leandro Lino (2T) |

COP Arena, Luque
Referee: Jesús Chinchilla (Venezuela)

27 May 2025
14:00

| AFEMEC (Paraguay) | 4–6 | (Chile) Colo-Colo |
|---|---|---|
| Fernando Brambilla (1T); Juan Pedrozo (1T); Juan Morel (2T) | APF report | Ricardo Lagos (1T); Cristian Arredondo (1T); Jonathan Guajardo (1T); Diego López (2T); Nolberto Farías (2T) |

COP Arena, Luque
Referee: Jaime Jativa (Ecuador)
27 May 2025
16:00

| Magnus Futsal (Brazil) | 3–1 | (Colombia) Sabaneros |
|---|---|---|
| Carlos Augusto (2T); João de Moraes (2T); Rodrigo Hardy (2T) | APF report | Jorge Cuervo (1T) |

COP Arena, Luque
Referee: Federico Piccardo (Uruguay)

=== Group B ===
| Pos | Team | Pld | W | D | L | GF | GA | GD | Pts | Qualification |
|---|---|---|---|---|---|---|---|---|---|---|
| 1 | (Venezuela) Centauros | 3 | 2 | 1 | 0 | 6 | 3 | +3 | 7 | Quarter-finals |
| 2 | (Paraguay) Cerro Porteño (H) | 3 | 2 | 0 | 1 | 8 | 6 | +2 | 6 | Quarter-finals |
| 3 | (Argentina) 17 de Agosto | 3 | 1 | 1 | 1 | 6 | 8 | −2 | 4 | Quarter-finals |
| 4 | (Ecuador) Divino Niño | 3 | 0 | 0 | 3 | 6 | 9 | −3 | 0 | Eleventh place play-off |

Source: CONMEBOL
Rules for classification: Group stage tiebreakers
(H) Hosts
25 May 2025
18:00

| Cerro Porteño (Paraguay) | 3–2 | (Ecuador) Divino Niño |
|---|---|---|
| Pedro Pascottini (1T); Jorge Espinoza (2T) | APF report | Albenis García (1T) |

COP Arena, Luque
Referee: Ricardo Messa (Brazil)
25 May 2025
20:00

| 17 de Agosto (Argentina) | 1–1 | (Venezuela) Centauros |
|---|---|---|
| Nicolás Lachaga (1T) | APF report | Rafael Morillo (2T) |

COP Arena, Luque
Referee: Daniel Rodríguez (Uruguay)

26 May 2025
18:00

| 17 de Agosto (Argentina) | 3–2 | (Ecuador) Divino Niño |
|---|---|---|
| Lucas Suárez (1T); Franco Martínez (1T); Lucas Martínez (2T) | APF report | José Mite (2T); Jimmy Espinales (2T) |

COP Arena, Luque
Referee: Andrés Martínez (Uruguay)
26 May 2025
20:00

| Centauros (Venezuela) | 2–0 | (Paraguay) Cerro Porteño |
|---|---|---|
| Saimond Francia (2T); Maikel Torres (2T) | APF report |

COP Arena, Luque
Referee: Rolando Bermúdez (Colombia)

27 May 2025
18:00

| Divino Niño (Ecuador) | 2–3 | (Venezuela) Centauros |
|---|---|---|
| Jerson Nazareno (2T); Albenis García (2T) | APF report | Rafael Morillo (1T); Carlos Moreno (2T); Víctor Carreño (2T) |

COP Arena, Luque
Referee: Jhilber Choque (Bolivia)
27 May 2025
20:00

| Cerro Porteño (Paraguay) | 5–2 | (Argentina) 17 de Agosto |
|---|---|---|
| Jorge Espinoza (2T); Marcio Ramírez (2T); Emerson Méndez (2T); Pedro Pascottini (2T); Enmanuel Ayala (2T) | APF report | Lucas Suárez (1T); Ramiro Caresani (2T) |

COP Arena, Luque
Referee: Alfredo Wagner (Brazil)

=== Group C ===
| Pos | Team | Pld | W | D | L | GF | GA | GD | Pts | Qualification |
|---|---|---|---|---|---|---|---|---|---|---|
| 1 | (Uruguay) Peñarol | 3 | 2 | 0 | 1 | 5 | 2 | +3 | 6 (Note: Head-to-head result: Joinville 0–3 Peñarol.) | Quarter-finals |
| 2 | (Brazil) Joinville | 3 | 2 | 0 | 1 | 8 | 5 | +3 | 6 | Quarter-finals |
| 3 | (Bolivia) Morales Moralitos | 3 | 1 | 1 | 1 | 4 | 5 | −1 | 4 | Quarter-finals |
| 4 | (Peru) Universitario | 3 | 0 | 1 | 2 | 2 | 7 | −5 | 1 | Ninth place play-off |

Source: CONMEBOL
Rules for classification: Group stage tiebreakers
Notes:
25 May 2025
10:00

| Joinville (Brazil) | 3–1 | (Bolivia) Morales Moralitos |
|---|---|---|
| Éder Lima (2T); Alex Valentim (2T); Ángelo Santofimio (2T) | APF report | Yulian Díaz (2T) |

COP Arena, Luque
Referee: Carlos Martínez (Paraguay)
25 May 2025
12:00

| Peñarol (Uruguay) | 1–0 | (Peru) Universitario |
|---|---|---|
| Juan Custodio (2T) | APF report |

COP Arena, Luque
Referee: Yuri García (Colombia)

26 May 2025
10:00

| Peñarol (Uruguay) | 1–2 | (Bolivia) Morales Moralitos |
|---|---|---|
| Matheus de Oliveira (2T) | APF report | Jorge Abril (2T); Ángelo Santofimio (2T) |

COP Arena, Luque
Referee: Daniel Manrique (Colombia)
26 May 2025
12:00

| Universitario (Peru) | 1–5 | (Brazil) Joinville |
|---|---|---|
| Pedro Mallaupoma (2T) | APF report | Lucas de Brito (1T); Luis Coelho (1T); Lucas Santos (1T); Henrique Gonçalves (2T); Éder Lima (2T) |

COP Arena, Luque
Referee: Jonathan Herbas (Ecuador)

27 May 2025
10:00

| Morales Moralitos (Bolivia) | 1–1 | (Peru) Universitario |
|---|---|---|
| Angello Paipay (2T) | APF report | Sebastián Obando (1T) |

COP Arena, Luque
Referee: Fausto Vigano (Argentina)
27 May 2025
12:00

| Joinville (Brazil) | 0–3 | (Uruguay) Peñarol |
|---|---|---|
| | APF report | Franco Duque (1T); Sasha Zapponi (2T) |

COP Arena, Luque
Referee: Bill Villalba (Paraguay)

=== Ranking of third-placed teams ===
| Pos | Grp | Team | Pld | W | D | L | GF | GA | GD | Pts | Qualification |
|---|---|---|---|---|---|---|---|---|---|---|---|
| 1 | C | (Bolivia) Morales Moralitos | 3 | 1 | 1 | 1 | 4 | 5 | −1 | 4 | Quarter-finals |
| 2 | B | (Argentina) 17 de Agosto | 3 | 1 | 1 | 1 | 6 | 8 | −2 | 4 | Quarter-finals |
| 3 | A | (Chile) Colo-Colo | 3 | 1 | 0 | 2 | 7 | 13 | −6 | 3 | Ninth place play-off |

Source: CONMEBOL
Rules for classification: 1) Points; 2) Goal difference; 3) Goals scored; 4) Fewest number of red cards received; 5) Fewest number of yellow cards received; 6) Draw.

=== Ranking of fourth-placed teams ===
| Pos | Grp | Team | Pld | W | D | L | GF | GA | GD | Pts | Qualification |
|---|---|---|---|---|---|---|---|---|---|---|---|
| 1 | C | (Peru) Universitario | 3 | 0 | 1 | 2 | 2 | 7 | −5 | 1 | Ninth place play-off |
| 2 | B | (Ecuador) Divino Niño | 3 | 0 | 0 | 3 | 6 | 9 | −3 | 0 | Eleventh place play-off |
| 3 | A | (Paraguay) AFEMEC | 3 | 0 | 0 | 3 | 5 | 19 | −14 | 0 | Eleventh place play-off |

Source: CONMEBOL
Rules for classification: 1) Points; 2) Goal difference; 3) Goals scored; 4) Fewest number of red cards received; 5) Fewest number of yellow cards received; 6) Draw.

== Final stage ==
In the quarter-finals, semi-finals and final, extra time and penalty shoot-out would be used to decide the winner if necessary, with the play-offs for third to twelfth place being decided directly penalty shoot-out in case of tie (Regulations Article 22).

All kick-off times are local times, PYT (UTC−3), as listed by CONMEBOL.

=== Bracket ===
The quarter-final matchups are:

- QF1: Winner Group A vs. 2nd Best Third Place
- QF2: Winner Group B vs. 1st Best Third Place
- QF3: Winner Group C vs. Runner-up Group A
- QF4: Runner-up Group B vs. Runner-up Group C

The semi-final matchups are:

- SF1: Winner QF1 vs. Winner QF4
- SF2: Winner QF2 vs. Winner QF3

5th place match
31 May
(Paraguay) Cerro Porteño | 1
(Bolivia) Morales Moralitos | 0
7th place match
31 May
(Argentina) 17 de Agosto | 7
(Colombia) Sabaneros | 3

5th–8th place semi-finals
30 May
(Argentina) 17 de Agosto | 1
(Paraguay) Cerro Porteño | 2
30 May
(Bolivia) Morales Moralitos (p) | 3 (6)
(Colombia) Sabaneros | 3 (5)

Quarter-finals
29 May
(Brazil) Magnus Futsal | 2
(Argentina) 17 de Agosto | 0
29 May
(Paraguay) Cerro Porteño | 2
(Brazil) Joinville | 5
29 May
(Venezuela) Centauros | 2
(Bolivia) Morales Moralitos | 1
29 May
(Uruguay) Peñarol (p) | 4 (3)
(Colombia) Sabaneros | 4 (0)

Semi-finals
31 May
(Brazil) Magnus Futsal | 2
(Brazil) Joinville | 1
31 May
(Venezuela) Centauros | 0
(Uruguay) Peñarol | 1

Final
1 June
(Brazil) Magnus Futsal | 1
(Uruguay) Peñarol | 3
3rd place match
1 June
(Brazil) Joinville | 3
(Venezuela) Centauros | 0

| 11th place match |
| 30 May |
| (Ecuador) Divino Niño | 3 |
| (Paraguay) AFEMEC | 2 |

| 9th place match |
| 30 May |
| (Chile) Colo-Colo | 0 |
| (Peru) Universitario | 3 |

=== Quarter-finals ===
29 May 2025
11:30

| Peñarol (Uruguay) | 4–4 (a.e.t.) | (Colombia) Sabaneros |
|---|---|---|
| Mathías Fernández (1T); Nicolás Ordoqui (1T); Sasha Zapponi (1T) | APF report | Juan Blanco (1T); Brayan Guette (1T) |
Penalties
| Nicolás Ordoqui (penalty scored); Mathias Fernández (penalty scored); Caio dos Santos (penalty scored) | 3–0 | (penalty missed) Jeiner Galindo; (penalty missed) Leonel Martínez; (penalty missed) Brayan Guette |

COP Arena, Luque
Referee: Ricardo Messa (Brazil)

29 May 2025
14:00

| Centauros (Venezuela) | 2–1 | (Bolivia) Morales Moralitos |
|---|---|---|
| Jesús Viamonte (1T); Carlos Vento (2T) | APF report | Alejandro Choqueticlla (2T) |

COP Arena, Luque
Referee: Carlos Martínez (Paraguay)

29 May 2025
16:30

| Magnus Futsal (Brazil) | 2–0 | (Argentina) 17 de Agosto |
|---|---|---|
| Genaro Soares (2T); Rodrigo Hardy (2T) | APF report |

COP Arena, Luque
Referee: Yuri García (Colombia)

29 May 2025
19:00

| Cerro Porteño (Paraguay) | 2–5 | (Brazil) Joinville |
|---|---|---|
| Enmanuel Ayala (1T); Emerson Méndez (1T) | APF report | Luis Coelho (1T); Éder Lima (1T); Pedro Duarte (1T); Henrique Gonçalves (2T) |

COP Arena, Luque
Referee: Daniel Rodríguez (Uruguay)

=== Semi-finals ===
==== 5th–8th place ====
30 May 2025
16:30

| Morales Moralitos (Bolivia) | 3–3 | (Colombia) Sabaneros |
|---|---|---|
| Juan Wiza (2T); Luis Posada (2T) | APF report | Ronald Solorzano (1T); Jorge Ospino (2T); Juan David Blanco (2T) |
Penalties
| Luis Posada (penalty scored); Diego Ortiz (penalty scored); Yulian Díaz (penalty scored); Alejandro Choqueticlla (penalty scored); Esteban Sánchez (penalty scored); Dennys Gómez (penalty scored) | 6–5 | (penalty scored) Jorge Cuevo; (penalty scored) Brayan Guette; (penalty scored) Iván Monterroza; (penalty scored) Juan David Blanco; (penalty scored) Jorge Ospino; (penalty missed) Santiago Mosquera |

COP Arena, Luque
Referee: Andrés Pena García (Argentina)

30 May 2025
19:00

| 17 de Agosto (Argentina) | 1–2 | (Paraguay) Cerro Porteño |
|---|---|---|
| Ramiro Caresani (1T) | APF report | Rodrigo Duarte (2T); Enrique Areco (2T) |

COP Arena, Luque
Referee: Henry Gutiérrez (Bolivia)

==== 1st–4th place ====
31 May 2025
16:30

| Centauros (Venezuela) | 0–1 | (Uruguay) Peñarol |
|---|---|---|
| | APF report | Nicolás Tumkiewicz (1T) |

COP Arena, Luque
Referee: Daniel Manrique (Colombia)

31 May 2025
19:00

| Magnus Futsal (Brazil) | 2–1 | (Brazil) Joinville |
|---|---|---|
| Leandro Lino (2T); Diego Da Silva (2T) | APF report | Darci Neto (2T) |

COP Arena, Luque
Referee: Lautaro Romero (Argentina)

=== Finals ===
==== 11th place match ====
30 May 2025
11:30

| Divino Niño (Ecuador) | 3–2 | (Paraguay) AFEMEC |
|---|---|---|
| Bryan Almendariz (2T) | APF report | José Balbuena (1T); Christian Silva (2T) |

COP Arena, Luque
Referee: Camilo Riquelme (Chile)

==== 9th place match ====
30 May 2025
14:00

| Colo-Colo (Chile) | 0–3 | (Peru) Universitario |
|---|---|---|
| | APF report | Pedro Mallaupoma 5'; Oswaldo Cornejo 6'; Franco Colán 40' |

COP Arena, Luque
Referee: Linderman Bruzuela (Venezuela)

==== 7th place match ====
31 May 2025
11:30

| 17 de Agosto (Argentina) | 7–3 | (Colombia) Sabaneros |
|---|---|---|
| Nicolás Lachaga (1T); Ramiro Caresani (1T); Franco Martínez (2T); Matías Soñer (2T); Lucas Suárez (2T) | APF report | Carlos Colmenares (2T); Jeiber Galindo (2T); Brayan Guette (2T) |

COP Arena, Luque
Referee: Alfredo Wagner (Brazil)

==== 5th place match ====
31 May 2025
14:00

| Cerro Porteño (Paraguay) | 1–0 | (Bolivia) Morales Moralitos |
|---|---|---|
| Emerson Méndez (2T) | APF report |

COP Arena, Luque
Referee: Henry Gutiérrez (Bolivia)

==== 3rd place match ====
1 June 2025
15:00

| Joinville (Brazil) | 3–0 | (Venezuela) Centauros |
|---|---|---|
| Roniele dos Santos (1T); Éder Lima (1T); Ernani de Oliveira (2T) | APF report |

COP Arena, Luque
Referee: Daniel Rodríguez (Uruguay)

==== Final ====
1 June 2025
18:00

| Magnus Futsal (Brazil) | 1–3 | (Uruguay) Peñarol |
|---|---|---|
| Leandro Lino (2T) | APF report | Lucas Rodriguez (1T); Nicolás Ordoqui (2T); Franco Duque (2T) |

COP Arena, Luque
Referee: Henry Gutiérrez (Bolivia)

== Final ranking ==
| Rank | Team |
|---|---|
| 1st place, gold medalist(s) | (Uruguay) Peñarol |
| 2nd place, silver medalist(s) | (Brazil) Magnus Futsal |
| 3rd place, bronze medalist(s) | (Brazil) Joinville |
| 4 | (Venezuela) Centauros |
| 5 | (Paraguay) Cerro Porteño |
| 6 | (Bolivia) Morales Moralitos |
| 7 | (Argentina) 17 de Agosto |
| 8 | (Colombia) Sabaneros |
| 9 | (Peru) Universitario |
| 10 | (Chile) Colo-Colo |
| 11 | (Ecuador) Divino Niño |
| 12 | (Paraguay) AFEMEC |
