= 2023 Copa Libertadores de Futsal =

Copa CONMEBOL Libertadores de Futsal Venezuela 2023

Tournament details
- Host country: Venezuela
- City: Caracas
- Dates: 21–28 May 2023
- Teams: 12 (from 10 associations)
- Venue: 1 (in 1 host city)

Final positions
- Champions: (Brazil) Cascavel (2nd title)
- Runners-up: (Brazil) Joinville
- Third place: (Venezuela) Centauros
- Fourth place: (Ecuador) Bocca

Tournament statistics
- Matches played: 32
- Goals scored: 129 (4.03 per match)
- All statistics correct as of 28 May 2023.

The 2023 Copa CONMEBOL Libertadores de Futsal was the 22nd edition of the Copa Libertadores de Futsal, South America's premier club futsal tournament organized by CONMEBOL. The tournament was held in Caracas, Venezuela between 21 and 28 May 2023, with Brazilian team Cascavel taking the title for the second time in a row.

Cascavel are the defending champions.

== Teams ==
The competition was contested by 12 teams: the title holders, one entry from each of the ten CONMEBOL associations, plus an additional entry from the host association.

Association	Team	Qualification method
Argentina	Barracas Central	2023 Copa Libertadores qualification play-off winners.
Bolivia	Fantasmas	2022 Liga Nacional de Futsal champions.
Brazil	Cascavel (holders)	2022 Copa Libertadores de Futsal champions.
Brazil	Joinville	2023 Supercopa de Futsal champions.
Chile	Deportes Recoleta	2022 Supercopa de Futsal Primera winners.
Colombia	Real Antioquia	2022 Superliga Futsal FCF winners.
Ecuador	Bocca	2022 Liga Nacional de Futsal champions.
Paraguay	Cerro Porteño	2022 Liga Premium de Futsal champions.
Peru	Panta Walon	2022 Primera División Futsal Pro champions.
Uruguay	Peñarol	2022 Campeonato Uruguayo de Fútbol Sala champions.
Venezuela (hosts)	Centauros	2022 Liga FUTVE Futsal 1 champions.
Venezuela (hosts)	Tigres	2022 Liga FUTVE Futsal 1 Torneo Clausura runners-up.

Notes

1. Argentina (ARG): The Argentina berth was decided in a play-off played between the 2022 Campeonato Único de Primera División champions (San Lorenzo) and the 2022 Liga Nacional de Futsal champions (Barracas Central).
2. Venezuela (VEN): Venezuelan's second berth was originally assigned to Bucaneros (2022 Torneo Apertura runners-up) for being the team with the best performance in the 2022 season behind the champions Centauros. However, Bucaneros decided not to participate in the 2023 Liga FUTVE Futsal 1, and consequently its place in the 2023 Copa Libertadores was taken by Tigres, runners-up in the 2022 Torneo Clausura.

== Venue ==
The tournament will be entirely played at the Poliedro de Caracas located in La Rinconada zone in Caracas, Venezuela. The Poliedro de Caracas has a capacity for 13,000 spectators.

== Draw ==
The draw of the tournament will be held on 28 April 2023, 12:00 PYT (UTC−4), at the CONMEBOL headquarters in Luque, Paraguay. The draw was conducted based on Regulations Article 16 as follows:

Initially, three teams were seeded and assigned to the head of the groups (Cascavel automatically to Group A, the others two via a draw from pot 1):

- To Group A: as 2022 Copa Libertadores champions, Cascavel (Brazil)
- To Group B: as the representative of the champion national association of the 2022 Copa Libertadores, Joinville (Brazil)
- To Group C: as the first representative of the host association, Centauros (Venezuela)

The remaining nine teams were split into three pots of three based on the final placement of their national association's club in the previous edition of the championship, with the highest three (Uruguay, Argentina and Paraguay) placed in Pot 2, the next three (Peru, Ecuador and Colombia) placed in Pot 3 and the lowest two (Bolivia and Chile) in pot 4, alongside the additional Venezuelan team.

Pot 1 (seeds)	Pot 2	Pot 3	Pot 4
(Venezuela) Centauros; (Brazil) Joinville	(Uruguay) Peñarol; (Argentina) Barracas Central; (Paraguay) Cerro Porteño	(Peru) Panta Walon; (Ecuador) Bocca; (Colombia) Real Antioquia	(Bolivia) Fantasmas; (Chile) Deportes Recoleta; (Venezuela) Tigres

From each pot, the first team drawn was placed into Group A, the second team drawn placed into Group B and the final team drawn placed into Group C. Teams from the same national association could not be drawn into the same group.

The draw resulted in the following groups:

Group A
Pos	Team
A1	(Brazil) Cascavel
A2	(Paraguay) Cerro Porteño
A3	(Peru) Panta Walon
A4	(Venezuela) Tigres

Group B
Pos	Team
B1	(Brazil) Joinville
B2	(Argentina) Barracas Central
B3	(Colombia) Real Antioquia
B4	(Bolivia) Fantasmas

Group C
Pos	Team
C1	(Venezuela) Centauros
C2	(Uruguay) Peñarol
C3	(Ecuador) Bocca
C4	(Chile) Deportes Recoleta

== Squads ==
Each team had to enter a squad of a maximum of 14 and a minimum of 9 players, including at least two goalkeepers (Regulations Article 48).

== Group stage ==
The top two teams of each group and the two best third-placed teams advance to the quarter-finals.

Tiebreakers

Teams are ranked according to points earned (3 points for a win, 1 point for a draw, 0 points for a loss). If tied on points, tiebreakers are applied in the following order (Regulations Article 21):

1. Results in head-to-head matches between tied teams (points, goal difference, goals scored);
2. Goal difference in all matches;
3. Goals scored in all matches;
4. Fewest number of red cards received;
5. Fewest number of yellow cards received;
6. Drawing of lots.

All match times are in VET (UTC−4), as listed by CONMEBOL.

=== Group A ===
Pos	Team	Pld	W	D	L	GF	GA	GD	Pts	Qualification
1	(Brazil) Cascavel	3	2	1	0	10	4	+6	7	Quarter-finals
2	(Paraguay) Cerro Porteño	3	2	0	1	7	7	0	6	Quarter-finals
3	(Peru) Panta Walon	3	1	1	1	5	7	−2	4	Quarter-finals
4	(Venezuela) Tigres (H)	3	0	0	3	5	9	−4	0	Eleventh place play-off

Source: CONMEBOL
Rules for classification: Group stage tiebreakers
(H) Hosts
21 May 2023
10:00

Cascavel (Brazil)	3–1	(Venezuela) Tigres
Rafael Ernandes; Gessé; Micuim	Report	Maikel Hernández

Poliedro de Caracas, Caracas
Referee: Cristian Espíndola (Chile)
21 May 2023
12:00

Cerro Porteño (Paraguay)	3–0	(Peru) Panta Walon
Jorge Espinoza; Arnaldo Báez; Carlos Arana	Report

Poliedro de Caracas, Caracas
Referee: Lautaro Romero (Argentina)

22 May 2023
10:00

Panta Walon (Peru)	2–2	(Brazil) Cascavel
Leanderson Cameiro; Jordi Rivera	Report	Thales Feitosa; Rafael Ernandes

Poliedro de Caracas, Caracas
Referee: Henry Gutiérrez (Bolivia)
22 May 2023
12:00

Cerro Porteño (Paraguay)	3–2	(Venezuela) Tigres
Jorge Espinoza; Rodrigo Ayala; Gonzalo Abdala	Report	Greudy Salas; Gregory Veramendi

Poliedro de Caracas, Caracas
Referee: Yuri García (Colombia)

23 May 2023
10:00

Cascavel (Brazil)	5–1	(Paraguay) Cerro Porteño
Jorginho; Rafael Ernandes; Gessé; Jhony; Matheus De Lima	Report	(o.g.) Gustavinho

Poliedro de Caracas, Caracas
Referee: Andrés Peña (Argentina)
23 May 2023
12:00

Tigres (Venezuela)	2–3	(Peru) Panta Walon
Michael Gelvez; Wilmer Cabarcas	Report	Xavier Tavera; Leanderson Carneiro

Poliedro de Caracas, Caracas
Referee: Lautaro Romero (Argentina)

=== Group B ===
Pos	Team	Pld	W	D	L	GF	GA	GD	Pts	Qualification
1	(Brazil) Joinville	3	2	1	0	4	2	+2	7	Quarter-finals
2	(Argentina) Barracas Central	3	1	2	0	6	3	+3	5	Quarter-finals
3	(Colombia) Real Antioquia	3	0	2	1	3	4	−1	2	Ninth place play-off
4	(Bolivia) Fantasmas	3	0	1	2	4	8	−4	1	Ninth place play-off

Source: CONMEBOL
Rules for classification: Group stage tiebreakers
21 May 2023
14:00

Joinville (Brazil)	1–0	(Bolivia) Fantasmas
João Silveira	Report

Poliedro de Caracas, Caracas
Referee: Junior Patiño (Venezuela)
21 May 2023
16:00

Barracas Central (Argentina)	0–0	(Colombia) Real Antioquia
	Report

Poliedro de Caracas, Caracas
Referee: Daniel Rodriguez (Uruguay)

22 May 2023
14:00

Real Antioquia (Colombia)	0–1	(Brazil) Joinville
	Report	Rafinha

Poliedro de Caracas, Caracas
Referee: Cristian Espíndola (Chile)
22 May 2023
16:00

Barracas Central (Argentina)	4–1	(Bolivia) Fantasmas
Biagio Russo; Facundo Fontanella; Franco Garrido	Report	José Sánchez

Poliedro de Caracas, Caracas
Referee: Andrés Martínez (Uruguay)

23 May 2023
14:00

Joinville (Brazil)	2–2	(Argentina) Barracas Central
Éder Lima	Report	Biagio Russo; Gabriel Ramirez

Poliedro de Caracas, Caracas
Referee: Daniel Rodríguez (Uruguay)
23 May 2023
16:00

Fantasmas (Bolivia)	3–3	(Colombia) Real Antioquia
Roberto Guerrero; Nicolás Vásquez; Cristian Jiménez	Report	Cristian Arganfo; Yovan Cardenas; Juan Uribe

Poliedro de Caracas, Caracas
Referee: Rolly Rojas (Peru)

=== Group C ===
Pos	Team	Pld	W	D	L	GF	GA	GD	Pts	Qualification
1	(Venezuela) Centauros (H)	3	2	1	0	4	0	+4	7	Quarter-finals
2	(Ecuador) Bocca	3	1	1	1	4	3	+1	4	Quarter-finals
3	(Uruguay) Peñarol	3	0	3	0	1	1	0	3	Quarter-finals
4	(Chile) Deportes Recoleta	3	0	1	2	3	8	−5	1	Eleventh place play-off

Source: CONMEBOL
Rules for classification: Group stage tiebreakers
(H) Hosts
21 May 2023
18:00

Centauros (Venezuela)	3–0	(Chile) Deportes Recoleta
Kevin Briceño; Greydelvid Junior Teran; José Ascanio	Report

Poliedro de Caracas, Caracas
Referee: Felipe Ventura (Brazil)
21 May 2023
20:00

Peñarol (Uruguay)	0–0	(Ecuador) Bocca
	Report

Poliedro de Caracas, Caracas
Referee: Ricardo Messa (Brazil)

22 May 2023
18:00

Bocca (Ecuador)	0–1	(Venezuela) Centauros
	Report	Eneiker Morales

Poliedro de Caracas, Caracas
Referee: Rolly Rojas (Peru)
22 May 2023
20:00

Peñarol (Uruguay)	1–1	(Chile) Deportes Recoleta
Alfredo Vidal	Report	Moisés Pulgar

Poliedro de Caracas, Caracas
Referee: Andrés Peña (Argentina)

23 May 2023
18:00

Centauros (Venezuela)	0–0	(Uruguay) Peñarol
	Report

Poliedro de Caracas, Caracas
Referee: Anelize Schulz (Brazil)
23 May 2023
20:00

Deportes Recoleta (Chile)	2–4	(Ecuador) Bocca
Francisco Feliu; Moisés Pulgar	Report	Pedro Pascottini; Diego Bermudez; Sergio Arcibar

Poliedro de Caracas, Caracas
Referee: Felipe Ventura (Brazil)

=== Ranking of third-placed teams ===
Pos	Grp	Team	Pld	W	D	L	GF	GA	GD	Pts	Qualification
1	A	(Peru) Panta Walon	3	1	1	1	5	7	−2	4	Quarter-finals
2	C	(Uruguay) Peñarol	3	0	3	0	1	1	0	3	Quarter-finals
3	B	(Colombia) Real Antioquia	3	0	2	1	3	4	−1	2	Ninth place play-off

Source: CONMEBOL
Rules for classification: 1) Points; 2) Goal difference; 3) Goals scored; 4) Fewest number of red cards received; 5) Fewest number of yellow cards received; 6) Draw.

=== Ranking of fourth-placed teams ===
Pos	Grp	Team	Pld	W	D	L	GF	GA	GD	Pts	Qualification
1	B	(Bolivia) Fantasmas	3	0	1	2	4	8	−4	1	Ninth place play-off
2	C	(Chile) Deportes Recoleta	3	0	1	2	3	8	−5	1	Eleventh place play-off
3	A	(Venezuela) Tigres (H)	3	0	0	3	5	9	−4	0	Eleventh place play-off

Source: CONMEBOL
Rules for classification: 1) Points; 2) Goal difference; 3) Goals scored; 4) Fewest number of red cards received; 5) Fewest number of yellow cards received; 6) Draw.
(H) Hosts

== Final stage ==
In the quarter-finals, semi-finals and final, extra time and penalty shoot-out would be used to decide the winner if necessary (no extra time would be used in the play-offs for third to twelfth place) (Regulations Article 22).

All match times are in VET (UTC−4).

=== Bracket ===
The quarter-final matchups are:

- QF1: Winner Group A vs. 2nd Best Third Place
- QF2: Winner Group B vs. 1st Best Third Place
- QF3: Winner Group C vs. Runner-up Group A
- QF4: Runner-up Group B vs. Runner-up Group C

The semi-final matchups are:

- SF1: Winner QF1 vs. Winner QF4
- SF2: Winner QF2 vs. Winner QF3

5th place match
27 May
(Argentina) Barracas Central	3
(Peru) Panta Walon	2
7th place match
27 May
(Uruguay) Peñarol	3
(Paraguay) Cerro Porteño	1

5th–8th place semi-finals
26 May
(Uruguay) Peñarol	4
(Argentina) Barracas Central	5
26 May
(Peru) Panta Walon	5
(Paraguay) Cerro Porteño	3

Quarter-finals
25 May
(Brazil) Cascavel	4
(Uruguay) Peñarol	0
25 May
(Argentina) Barracas Central	1 (4)
(Ecuador) Bocca (p)	1 (5)
25 May
(Brazil) Joinville (p)	3 (3)
(Peru) Panta Walon	3 (1)
25 May
(Venezuela) Centauros	5
(Paraguay) Cerro Porteño	3

Semi-finals
27 May
(Brazil) Cascavel	3
(Ecuador) Bocca	2
27 May
(Brazil) Joinville	2
(Venezuela) Centauros	0

Final
28 May
(Brazil) Cascavel	3
(Brazil) Joinville	1
3rd place match
28 May
(Ecuador) Bocca	0
(Venezuela) Centauros	2

11th place match
26 May
(Chile) Deportes Recoleta	1
(Venezuela) Tigres	6

9th place match
26 May
(Colombia) Real Antioquia	2
(Bolivia) Fantasmas	5

=== Quarter-finals ===
25 May 2023
12:00

Cascavel (Brazil)	4–0	(Uruguay) Peñarol
Zequinha 3'; Rafael Ernandes 30', 35'; Thales Feitosa 37'	Report

Poliedro de Caracas, Caracas
Referee: Yuri García (Colombia)

25 May 2023
14:00

Joinville (Brazil)	3–3 (a.e.t.)	(Peru) Panta Walon
João Silveira 3'; Renatinho 14'; Henrique Gonçalves 27'	Report	Xavier Tavera 1', 38'; Ángel Angulo 32'
Penalties
João Silveira (penalty scored); Kevin (penalty scored); Rafinha (penalty scored)	3–1	(penalty missed) Xavier Tavera; (penalty scored) Ángel Angulo; (penalty missed) Robert Pereira; (penalty missed) Renzo Ramírez

Poliedro de Caracas, Caracas
Referee: Andrés Peña (Argentina)

25 May 2023
16:00

Barracas Central (Argentina)	1–1 (a.e.t.)	(Ecuador) Bocca
Marcos González 43'	Report	Josué Mercado 48'
Penalties
Matías Usinger (penalty scored); Alan De Candia (penalty scored); Augusto Van de Casteele (penalty scored); Nicolás Kravetsky (penalty scored); Facundo Fontanella (penalty missed)	4–5	(penalty scored) César Baldrich; (penalty scored) Sergio Alcíbar; (penalty scored) Alejandro Nazareno; (penalty scored) Josué Mercado; (penalty scored) Jerson Nazareno

Poliedro de Caracas, Caracas
Referee: Cristian Espíndola (Chile)

25 May 2023
18:00

Centauros (Venezuela)	5–3 (a.e.t.)	(Paraguay) Cerro Porteño
Kevin Briceño 12', 13'; Edward Marcano 41'; Greydavid Terán 48'; Luis Abello 49'	Report	Carlos Arana 17'; Arnaldo Báez 26'; Gonzalo Abdala 42'

Poliedro de Caracas, Caracas
Referee: Daniel Rodríguez (Uruguay)

=== Semi-finals ===
==== 5th–8th place ====
26 May 2023
16:00

Peñarol (Uruguay)	4–5	(Argentina) Barracas Central
Brandon Díaz 11'; Xapa 12', 36'; André Martins 13'		Matías Usinger 9'; Augusto Van de Casteele 13'; Alan De Candia 17'; Brian Burgos 34'; Franco Garrido 39'

Poliedro de Caracas, Caracas
Referee: Ricardo Messa (Brazil)

26 May 2023
18:00

Panta Walon (Peru)	5–3	(Paraguay) Cerro Porteño
Renzo Ramírez 24'; Xavier Tavera 33'; Leonel Valencia 34', 39'; Junior Ulloa 36'		Arnaldo Báez 24', 38'; Alan Rojas 37'

Poliedro de Caracas, Caracas
Referee: Anelize Schulz (Brazil)

==== 1st–4th place ====
27 May 2023
16:00

Cascavel (Brazil)	3–2	(Ecuador) Bocca
Jorginho; Zequinha; Claudinho		Alejandro Nazareno

Poliedro de Caracas, Caracas

27 May 2023
18:30

Joinville (Brazil)	2–0	(Venezuela) Centauros
Rafinha; Kevin Farias

Poliedro de Caracas, Caracas

=== Finals ===
==== 11th place match ====
26 May 2023
12:00

Deportes Recoleta (Chile)	1–6	(Venezuela) Tigres
Sebastián Olave 11'		Ángel Muñoz 10'; Jorge Preciado 19'; Gonzalo Pires 25', 34'; Gregory Veramendi 36'; Enso Valbuena 39'

Poliedro de Caracas, Caracas
Referee: Ulises Ureta (Peru)

==== 9th place match ====
26 May 2023
14:00

Real Antioquia (Colombia)	2–5	(Bolivia) Fantasmas
Yovan Cárdenas 18'; Kevin Terrazas 39' (o.g.)		Yulian Díaz 24', 31', 33', 34'; Freddy Grajeda 36'

Poliedro de Caracas, Caracas
Referee: Andrés Martínez (Uruguay)

==== 7th place match ====
27 May 2023
13:00

Peñarol (Uruguay)	3–1	(Paraguay) Cerro Porteño

Poliedro de Caracas, Caracas

==== 5th place match ====
27 May 2023
11:00

Barracas Central (Argentina)	3–2	(Peru) Panta Walon

Poliedro de Caracas, Caracas

==== 3rd place match ====
28 May 2023

Bocca (Ecuador)	0-2	(Venezuela) Centauros
	Report	Eneiker Morales; Kevin Briceño

Poliedro de Caracas, Caracas
Referee: Ricardo Amaral (Brazil)

==== Final ====
28 May 2023

Cascavel (Brazil)	3-1	(Brazil) Joinville
Zequinha 3'; Gessé 13'; Rafael Ernandes 38'	Report	39' Roni

Poliedro de Caracas, Caracas
Referee: Daniel Rodríguez (Uruguay)

== Final ranking ==
Rank	Team
1st place, gold medalist(s)	(Brazil) Cascavel
2nd place, silver medalist(s)	(Brazil) Joinville
3rd place, bronze medalist(s)	(Venezuela) Centauros
4	(Ecuador) Bocca
5	(Argentina) Barracas Central
6	(Peru) Panta Walon
7	(Uruguay) Peñarol
8	(Paraguay) Cerro Porteño
9	(Bolivia) Fantasmas
10	(Colombia) Real Antioquia
11	(Venezuela) Tigres
12	(Chile) Deportes Recoleta
