= Copa Libertadores de Futsal =

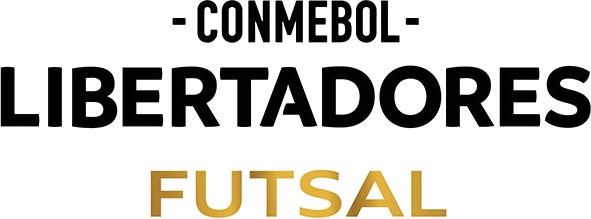
- Organizer(s): CONMEBOL
- Founded: 1970 (precursor); 2000 (current format)
- Region: South America
- Teams: 12
- Current champion(s): (Brazil) Carlos Barbosa (7th title)
- Most championships: (Brazil) Carlos Barbosa (7 titles)
- Website: conmebol.com
- 2026 Championship

The CONMEBOL Libertadores de Futsal (formerly South American Futsal Championship, Spanish: Campeonato Sudamericano de Futsal, Portuguese: Campeonato Sul-Americano de Futebol de Salão) is an international futsal competition disputed between the best clubs of South America. Since 2002, the tournament is formally organized by CONMEBOL.

== Competition format ==
Since 2002, the competition is divided in two zones, Zona Norte (North Zone) and Zona Sur (South Zone). This was intended to end the hegemony of the Brazilian teams in the tournament. Each zone is divided in two groups with a variable number of teams. The teams in each group play each other in a single party headquarters previously defined by CONMEBOL tournament for each zone. After playing all group matches the top two teams of each group meet in semifinals single party and crossed keys (first second of a group against the other), the winners of each match compete with each end of the area single party and the winner of the disputed area of the South American final against the winner of the other area the best of three games based determined by CONMEBOL. If a team does not attend matches as scheduled without justifying their absence and / or fails to reach agreement with the opposing team and the CONMEBOL to change dates, his opponent is declared as champion by walkover (W.O.).

== Results ==
Year	Host	Champion	Score	Runner-up
2000	(Brazil) Rio de Janeiro	(Brazil) Internacional	6–5	(Brazil) Vasco da Gama
2001	(Brazil) Carlos Barbosa	(Brazil) Banespa	6–5	(Brazil) Carlos Barbosa
2002	(Venezuela) Valera	(Brazil) Carlos Barbosa	7–4 / 9–6	(Venezuela) Pumas
2003	(Brazil) Carlos Barbosa	(Brazil) Carlos Barbosa	8–2 / 5–1	(Uruguay) Nacional
2004	(Peru) Lima	(Brazil) Jaraguá	13–6 / 8–1	(Peru) Kansas
2005	(Paraguay) Itauguá	(Brazil) Jaraguá	6–5 / 3–2	(Paraguay) Universidad Autónoma
2006	(Colombia) Fusagasugá	(Brazil) Jaraguá	5–2 / 8–3	(Colombia) Santa Fe
2007	(Brazil) Jaraguá do Sul	(Brazil) Jaraguá	7–1 / 6–2	(Colombia) Bello Jairuby
2008	(Brazil) Jaraguá do Sul	(Brazil) Jaraguá	11–4 / 10–2	(Venezuela) Deportivo Táchira
2009	(Argentina) Misiones	(Brazil) Jaraguá*	w/o	(Colombia) Bello Jairuby
2010	Not played			
2011**	(Paraguay) Encarnación	(Brazil) Carlos Barbosa	3–1	(Paraguay) Atlético Paranaense
2012	Not played			
2013	(Brazil) Orlândia	(Brazil) Intelli	4–1 / 7–2	(Colombia) Águilas Doradas
2014**	(Brazil) Erechim	(Brazil) Atlântico	3–2	(Argentina) Boca Juniors
2015	(Brazil) Itapetininga	(Brazil) Brasil Kirin	5–1 / 4–2	(Colombia) Real Bucaramanga
2016	(Paraguay) Asunción***	(Paraguay) Cerro Porteño	4–2	(Brazil) Jaraguá
2017	(Peru) Lima	(Brazil) Carlos Barbosa	2–1	(Paraguay) Cerro Porteño
2018	(Brazil) Carlos Barbosa	(Brazil) Carlos Barbosa	4–1	(Brazil) Joinville
2019	(Argentina) Buenos Aires	(Brazil) Carlos Barbosa	3–1	(Paraguay) Cerro Porteño
2020	Cancelled due to COVID-19 pandemic (originally scheduled 31 May – 7 June)			
2021	(Uruguay) Montevideo	(Argentina) San Lorenzo	4–3	(Brazil) Carlos Barbosa
2022	(Argentina) Buenos Aires	(Brazil) Cascavel	3–1	(Uruguay) Peñarol
2023	(Venezuela) Caracas	(Brazil) Cascavel	3–1	(Brazil) Joinville
2024	(Argentina) Tortuguitas	(Brazil) Magnus Futsal	4–2	(Argentina) Barracas Central
2025	(Paraguay) Asunción	(Uruguay) Peñarol	3–1	(Brazil) Magnus Futsal
2026	(Brazil) Carlos Barbosa	(Brazil) Carlos Barbosa	2-2 (p 7-6)	(Brazil) Magnus Futsal

Notes

* Jaraguá is declared champion because Bello Jairuby did not show to matches agreed to play in Brazil.

** The tournament was not played in the North Zone. Consequently, the South Zone tournament proclaimed a champion and runner-up on a continental level.

*** The tournament was originally scheduled to be played in La Guaira, Venezuela between 3–9 May 2016, but was later cancelled "for insurmountable force majeure and logistics". The tournament was relocated to be played in Asunción, Paraguay between 12 and 19 June 2016.

== Statistics ==
=== Performance by club ===
Club	Champion	Runner-up	Years won	Years runner-up
(Brazil) Carlos Barbosa	7	2	2002, 2003, 2011, 2017, 2018, 2019, 2026	2001, 2021
(Brazil) Jaraguá	6	1	2004, 2005, 2006, 2007, 2008, 2009	2016
(Brazil) Brasil Kirin/Magnus Futsal	2	2	2015, 2024	2025, 2026
(Brazil) Cascavel	2	0	2022, 2023	—
(Paraguay) Cerro Porteño	1	2	2016	2017, 2019
(Uruguay) Peñarol	1	1	2025	2022
(Brazil) Internacional	1	0	2000	—
(Brazil) Banespa	1	0	2001	—
(Brazil) Intelli	1	0	2013	—
(Brazil) Atlântico	1	0	2014	—
(Argentina) San Lorenzo	1	0	2021	—

=== Performance by nation ===
Nation	Winners	Runners-up	Years won
Brazil	21	8	2000, 2001, 2002, 2003, 2004, 2005, 2006, 2007, 2008, 2009, 2011, 2013, 2014, 2015, 2017, 2018, 2019, 2022, 2023, 2024, 2026
Paraguay	1	4	2016
Argentina	1	2	2021
Uruguay	1	2	2025
Colombia	0	5	
Venezuela	0	2	
Peru	0	1	
