= 2019 Copa Libertadores de Futsal =

Copa CONMEBOL Libertadores de Futsal Argentina 2019

Tournament details
- Host country: Argentina
- City: Buenos Aires
- Dates: 14–21 July 2019
- Teams: 12 (from 10 associations)
- Venue(s): 1 (in 1 host city)

Final positions
- Champions: (Brazil) Carlos Barbosa (7th title)
- Runners-up: (Paraguay) Cerro Porteño
- Third place: (Colombia) Alianza Platanera
- Fourth place: (Peru) Panta Walon

Tournament statistics
- Matches played: 32
- Goals scored: 184 (5.75 per match)

The 2019 Copa CONMEBOL Libertadores de Futsal was the 19th edition of the Copa Libertadores de Futsal, South America's premier club futsal tournament organized by CONMEBOL. The tournament was held at Buenos Aires, Argentina between 14–21 July 2019.

Carlos Barbosa were the defending champions.

== Teams ==
The competition was contested by 12 teams: the title holders, one entry from each of the ten CONMEBOL associations, plus an additional entry from the host association.

Association	Team
Argentina (hosts)	San Lorenzo
Argentina (hosts)	Villa La Ñata
Bolivia	Proyecto Latín
Brazil	Carlos Barbosa (holders)
Brazil	Corinthians
Chile	Universidad de Chile
Colombia	Alianza Platanera
Ecuador	Società Sportiva Bocca
Paraguay	Cerro Porteño
Peru	Panta Walon
Uruguay	Nacional
Venezuela	Bucaneros

== Venues ==
The tournament was played at the Polideportivo del Club San Lorenzo de Almagro in Buenos Aires.

== Draw ==
The draw of the tournament was held on 4 July 2019, 13:00 ART (UTC−3), at the Predio de Ezeiza of the Argentine Football Association in Buenos Aires. The twelve teams were drawn into three groups of four. The following three teams were seeded:

- Group A: the title holders
- Group B: the representative (champions) from the host association (Argentina)
- Group C: the representative from the association which were the runners-up from the previous edition (Brazil)

The other teams were seeded based on the results of their association in the 2018 Copa Libertadores de Futsal, with the additional entry from the host association seeded last. Each group, apart from the seeded team, contained one team from each of Pot 1, Pot 2, and Pot 3. Teams from the same association could not be drawn into the same group.

Seeds	Pot 1	Pot 2	Pot 3
(Brazil) Carlos Barbosa (Group A); (Argentina) San Lorenzo (Group B); (Brazil) Corinthians (Group C)	(Paraguay) Cerro Porteño; (Venezuela) Bucaneros; (Colombia) Alianza Platanera	(Uruguay) Nacional; (Bolivia) Proyecto Latín; Universidad de Chile	(Peru) Panta Walon; (Ecuador) Società Sportiva Bocca; (Argentina) Villa La Ñata

== Squads ==
Each team has to submit a squad of 14 players, including a minimum of two goalkeepers.

== Group stage ==
The top two teams of each group and the two best third-placed teams advance to the quarter-finals.

Tiebreakers

The teams are ranked according to points (3 points for a win, 1 point for a draw, 0 points for a loss). If tied on points, tiebreakers are applied in the following order (Regulations Article 21):

1. Results in head-to-head matches between tied teams (points, goal difference, goals scored);
2. Goal difference in all matches;
3. Goals scored in all matches;
4. Drawing of lots.

All times are local, ART (UTC−3).

=== Group A ===
Pos	Team	Pld	W	D	L	GF	GA	GD	Pts	Qualification
1	(Paraguay) Cerro Porteño	3	3	0	0	13	4	+9	9	Knockout stage
2	(Brazil) Carlos Barbosa	3	2	0	1	10	6	+4	6	Knockout stage
3	(Argentina) Villa La Ñata (H)	3	1	0	2	7	9	−2	3	Ninth place play-off
4	(Bolivia) Proyecto Latín	3	0	0	3	1	12	−11	0	Eleventh place play-off

Source: CONMEBOL
Rules for classification: Group stage tiebreakers
(H) Hosts
14 July 2019
10:00

Carlos Barbosa (Brazil)	2–4	(Paraguay) Cerro Porteño
	Report

Polideportivo del Club San Lorenzo de Almagro, Buenos Aires
14 July 2019
12:00

Proyecto Latín (Bolivia)	0–4	(Argentina) Villa La Ñata
	Report

Polideportivo del Club San Lorenzo de Almagro, Buenos Aires

15 July 2019
10:00

Cerro Porteño (Paraguay)	6–1	(Argentina) Villa La Ñata
	Report

Polideportivo del Club San Lorenzo de Almagro, Buenos Aires
15 July 2019
12:00

Carlos Barbosa (Brazil)	5–0	(Bolivia) Proyecto Latín
	Report

Polideportivo del Club San Lorenzo de Almagro, Buenos Aires

16 July 2019
10:00

Cerro Porteño (Paraguay)	3–1	(Bolivia) Proyecto Latín
	Report

Polideportivo del Club San Lorenzo de Almagro, Buenos Aires
16 July 2019
12:00

Villa La Ñata (Argentina)	2–3	(Brazil) Carlos Barbosa
	Report

Polideportivo del Club San Lorenzo de Almagro, Buenos Aires

=== Group B ===
Pos	Team	Pld	W	D	L	GF	GA	GD	Pts	Qualification
1	(Argentina) San Lorenzo (H)	3	2	1	0	7	2	+5	7	Knockout stage
2	(Colombia) Alianza Platanera	3	1	2	0	7	5	+2	5	Knockout stage
3	(Peru) Panta Walon	3	1	1	1	9	9	0	4	Knockout stage
4	Universidad de Chile	3	0	0	3	3	10	−7	0	Ninth place play-off

Source: CONMEBOL
Rules for classification: Group stage tiebreakers
(H) Hosts
14 July 2019
18:00

San Lorenzo (Argentina)	0–0	(Colombia) Alianza Platanera
	Report

Polideportivo del Club San Lorenzo de Almagro, Buenos Aires
14 July 2019
20:00

Universidad de Chile	2–3	(Peru) Panta Walon
	Report

Polideportivo del Club San Lorenzo de Almagro, Buenos Aires

15 July 2019
18:00

Alianza Platanera (Colombia)	4–4	(Peru) Panta Walon
	Report

Polideportivo del Club San Lorenzo de Almagro, Buenos Aires
15 July 2019
20:00

San Lorenzo (Argentina)	4–0	Universidad de Chile
	Report

Polideportivo del Club San Lorenzo de Almagro, Buenos Aires

16 July 2019
18:00

Alianza Platanera (Colombia)	3–1	Universidad de Chile
	Report

Polideportivo del Club San Lorenzo de Almagro, Buenos Aires
16 July 2019
20:00

Panta Walon (Peru)	2–3	(Argentina) San Lorenzo
	Report

Polideportivo del Club San Lorenzo de Almagro, Buenos Aires

=== Group C ===
Pos	Team	Pld	W	D	L	GF	GA	GD	Pts	Qualification
1	(Brazil) Corinthians	3	3	0	0	13	3	+10	9	Knockout stage
2	(Uruguay) Nacional	3	2	0	1	9	8	+1	6	Knockout stage
3	(Venezuela) Bucaneros	3	1	0	2	10	9	+1	3	Knockout stage
4	(Ecuador) Società Sportiva Bocca	3	0	0	3	10	22	−12	0	Eleventh place play-off

Source: CONMEBOL
Rules for classification: Group stage tiebreakers
14 July 2019
14:00

Corinthians (Brazil)	3–2	(Venezuela) Bucaneros
	Report

Polideportivo del Club San Lorenzo de Almagro, Buenos Aires
14 July 2019
16:00

Nacional (Uruguay)	7–5	(Ecuador) Società Sportiva Bocca
	Report

Polideportivo del Club San Lorenzo de Almagro, Buenos Aires

15 July 2019
14:00

Corinthians (Brazil)	3–1	(Uruguay) Nacional
	Report

Polideportivo del Club San Lorenzo de Almagro, Buenos Aires
15 July 2019
16:00

Bucaneros (Venezuela)	8–5	(Ecuador) Società Sportiva Bocca
	Report

Polideportivo del Club San Lorenzo de Almagro, Buenos Aires

16 July 2019
14:00

Società Sportiva Bocca (Ecuador)	0–7	(Brazil) Corinthians
	Report

Polideportivo del Club San Lorenzo de Almagro, Buenos Aires
16 July 2019
16:00

Bucaneros (Venezuela)	0–1	(Uruguay) Nacional
	Report

Polideportivo del Club San Lorenzo de Almagro, Buenos Aires

=== Ranking of third-placed teams ===
Pos	Grp	Team	Pld	W	D	L	GF	GA	GD	Pts	Qualification
1	B	(Peru) Panta Walon	3	1	1	1	9	9	0	4	Knockout stage
2	C	(Venezuela) Bucaneros	3	1	0	2	10	9	+1	3	Knockout stage
3	A	(Argentina) Villa La Ñata	3	1	0	2	7	9	−2	3	Ninth place play-off

Source: CONMEBOL
Rules for classification: 1) Points; 2) Goal difference; 3) Goals scored; 4) Draw.

=== Ranking of fourth-placed teams ===
Pos	Grp	Team	Pld	W	D	L	GF	GA	GD	Pts	Qualification
1	B	Universidad de Chile	3	0	0	3	3	10	−7	0	Ninth place play-off
2	A	(Bolivia) Proyecto Latín	3	0	0	3	1	12	−11	0	Eleventh place play-off
3	C	(Ecuador) Società Sportiva Bocca	3	0	0	3	10	22	−12	0	Eleventh place play-off

Source: CONMEBOL
Rules for classification: 1) Points; 2) Goal difference; 3) Goals scored; 4) Draw.

== Knockout stage ==
In the quarter-finals, semi-finals and final, extra time and penalty shoot-out would be used to decide the winner if necessary (no extra time would be used in the play-offs for third to twelfth place).

=== Bracket ===
The quarter-final matchups are:

- QF1: Winner Group A vs. 2nd Best Third Place
- QF2: Winner Group B vs. 1st Best Third Place
- QF3: Winner Group C vs. Runner-up Group A
- QF4: Runner-up Group B vs. Runner-up Group C

The semi-final matchups are:

- SF1: Winner QF1 vs. Winner QF4
- SF2: Winner QF2 vs. Winner QF3

Quarter-finals
18 July
(Paraguay) Cerro Porteño	9
(Venezuela) Bucaneros	4
18 July
(Colombia) Alianza Platanera	5
(Uruguay) Nacional	1
18 July
(Argentina) San Lorenzo	2
(Peru) Panta Walon (a.e.t.)	4
18 July
(Brazil) Corinthians	1
(Brazil) Carlos Barbosa	2

Semi-finals
20 July
(Paraguay) Cerro Porteño (a.e.t.)	5
(Colombia) Alianza Platanera	2
20 July
(Peru) Panta Walon	0
(Brazil) Carlos Barbosa	1

Final
21 July
(Paraguay) Cerro Porteño	1
(Brazil) Carlos Barbosa	3
Third place play-off
21 July
(Colombia) Alianza Platanera	4
(Peru) Panta Walon	1

Fifth to eighth place semi-finals
19 July
(Venezuela) Bucaneros	6
(Uruguay) Nacional	5
19 July
(Argentina) San Lorenzo	1
(Brazil) Corinthians	3

Fifth place play-off
20 July
(Venezuela) Bucaneros	1
(Brazil) Corinthians	4
Seventh place play-off
20 July
(Uruguay) Nacional	2
(Argentina) San Lorenzo	5

Ninth place play-off
19 July
(Argentina) Villa La Ñata	3
Universidad de Chile	5

Eleventh place play-off
19 July
(Bolivia) Proyecto Latín	3
(Ecuador) Società Sportiva Bocca	2

=== Quarter-finals ===
18 July 2019
14:00

Cerro Porteño (Paraguay)	9–4	(Venezuela) Bucaneros
	Report

Polideportivo del Club San Lorenzo de Almagro, Buenos Aires

18 July 2019
16:00

Corinthians (Brazil)	1–2	(Brazil) Carlos Barbosa
	Report

Polideportivo del Club San Lorenzo de Almagro, Buenos Aires

18 July 2019
18:00

Alianza Platanera (Colombia)	5–1	(Uruguay) Nacional
	Report

Polideportivo del Club San Lorenzo de Almagro, Buenos Aires

18 July 2019
20:00

San Lorenzo (Brazil)	2–4 (a.e.t.)	(Peru) Panta Walon
	Report

Polideportivo del Club San Lorenzo de Almagro, Buenos Aires

=== Eleventh place play-off ===
19 July 2019
14:00

Proyecto Latín (Bolivia)	3–2	(Ecuador) Società Sportiva Bocca
	Report

Polideportivo del Club San Lorenzo de Almagro, Buenos Aires

=== Ninth place play-off ===
19 July 2019
16:00

Villa La Ñata (Argentina)	3–5	Universidad de Chile
	Report

Polideportivo del Club San Lorenzo de Almagro, Buenos Aires

=== Fifth to eighth place semi-finals ===
19 July 2019
18:00

Bucaneros (Venezuela)	6–5	(Uruguay) Nacional
	Report

Polideportivo del Club San Lorenzo de Almagro, Buenos Aires

19 July 2019
20:00

San Lorenzo (Brazil)	1–3	(Brazil) Corinthians
	Report

Polideportivo del Club San Lorenzo de Almagro, Buenos Aires

=== Semi-finals ===
20 July 2019
14:00

Panta Walon (Peru)	0–1	(Brazil) Carlos Barbosa
	Report

Polideportivo del Club San Lorenzo de Almagro, Buenos Aires

20 July 2019
16:00

Cerro Porteño (Paraguay)	5–2 (a.e.t.)	(Colombia) Alianza Platanera
	Report

Polideportivo del Club San Lorenzo de Almagro, Buenos Aires

=== Seventh place play-off ===
20 July 2019
18:00

Nacional (Uruguay)	2–5	(Brazil) San Lorenzo
	Report

Polideportivo del Club San Lorenzo de Almagro, Buenos Aires

=== Fifth place play-off ===
20 July 2019
20:00

Bucaneros (Venezuela)	1–4	(Brazil) Corinthians
	Report

Polideportivo del Club San Lorenzo de Almagro, Buenos Aires

=== Third place play-off ===
21 July 2019
14:00

Alianza Platanera (Colombia)	4–1	(Peru) Panta Walon
	Report

Polideportivo del Club San Lorenzo de Almagro, Buenos Aires

=== Final ===
21 July 2019
16:00

Cerro Porteño (Paraguay)	1–3	(Brazil) Carlos Barbosa
	Report

Polideportivo del Club San Lorenzo de Almagro, Buenos Aires

== Final ranking ==
Rank	Team
1st place, gold medalist(s)	(Brazil) Carlos Barbosa
2nd place, silver medalist(s)	(Paraguay) Cerro Porteño
3rd place, bronze medalist(s)	(Colombia) Alianza Platanera
4	(Peru) Panta Walon
5	(Brazil) Corinthians
6	(Venezuela) Bucaneros
7	(Argentina) San Lorenzo
8	(Uruguay) Nacional
9	Universidad de Chile
10	(Argentina) Villa La Ñata
11	(Bolivia) Proyecto Latín
12	(Ecuador) Società Sportiva Bocca
