= Lucas Gomes (futsal player) =

Brazilian futsal player

Personal information
- Full name: Lucas Rodrigues Manardo Gomes
- Date of birth: 2 May 1999 (age 27)
- Place of birth: São Paulo, Brazil
- Height: 1.72 m (5 ft 8 in)
- Position: Defender

Team information
- Current team: Magnus Futsal

Youth career
- –2018: Magnus Futsal

Senior career*
Years	Team	Apps	(Gls)
2018–	Magnus Futsal	169	(48)

International career
2022–	Brazil	13	(3)
- * Club domestic league appearances and goals as of 12 September 2024

Lucas Rodrigues Manardo Gomes (born 2 May 1999), simply known as Lucas Gomes, is a Brazilian professional futsal player who plays as a defender for the Brazilian club Magnus Futsal.

== Career ==
Formed in Magnus Futsal de Sorocaba, a team that he defends to this day and has won several titles, Lucas Gomes stood out to the point of being called up for the Brazil national futsal team, when he won the 2023 Futsal Nations Cup

On 19 July 2024, Gomes was called up for the first 15 players list of 2024 FIFA Futsal World Cup, but ended up cut from the final list.

== Honours ==
Magnus Futsal

- Copa Libertadores de Futsal: 2024
- Liga Nacional de Futsal: 2020
- Taça Brasil de Futsal: 2021
- Copa do Brasil de Futsal: 2023
- Supercopa do Brasil de Futsal: 2018, 2021, 2024

Brazil

- Futsal Nations Cup: 2023
