= 2018 Copa Libertadores de Futsal =

Copa CONMEBOL Libertadores de Futsal Brasil 2018
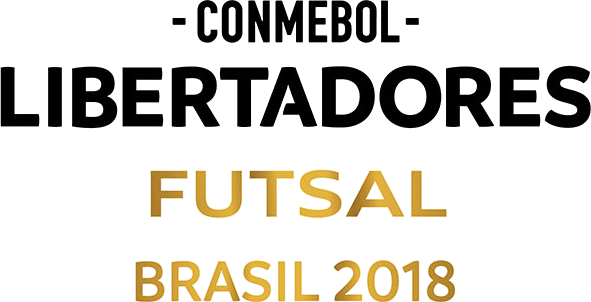

Tournament details
- Host country: Brazil
- City: Carlos Barbosa
- Dates: 22–29 April 2018
- Teams: 12 (from 10 associations)
- Venue(s): 1 (in 1 host city)

Final positions
- Champions: (Brazil) Carlos Barbosa (6th title)
- Runners-up: (Brazil) Joinville
- Third place: (Brazil) Sorocaba
- Fourth place: (Paraguay) Cerro Porteño

Tournament statistics
- Matches played: 26
- Goals scored: 157 (6.04 per match)
- Top scorer(s): Lé (7 goals)

The 2018 Copa CONMEBOL Libertadores de Futsal was the 18th edition of the Copa Libertadores de Futsal, South America's premier club futsal tournament organized by CONMEBOL.

The tournament was held at Carlos Barbosa, Brazil, between 22 and 29 April 2018.

Defending champions Carlos Barbosa defeated Joinville in the final to win their fifth title. Sorocaba defeated Cerro Porteño to finish third.

== Teams ==
The competition is contested by 12 teams: the title holders, one entry from each of the ten CONMEBOL associations, plus an additional entry from the host association.

Association	Team	Qualifying method
Argentina	Boca Juniors	2017 Campeonato de Futsal AFA champions
Bolivia	CRE	2017 Liga Nacional de Futsal champions
Brazil (hosts)	Carlos Barbosa	2017 Copa Libertadores de Futsal champions
Brazil (hosts)	Sorocaba	2018 Supercopa de Futsal champions
Brazil (hosts)	Joinville	2017 Taça Brasil de Futsal champions
Chile	Colo-Colo	2017 Campeonato Nacional de Futsal ANFP champions
Colombia	Leones de Nariño	2017 Superliga Colombiana de Fútsal champions
Ecuador	Società Sportiva Bocca	2016–17 Campeonato Nacional Futsal del Ecuador champions
Paraguay	Cerro Porteño	2017 Liga Nacional de Futsal FIFA champions
Peru	Panta Walon	2017 División de Honor de fútbol sala de Perú champions
Uruguay	Nacional	2017 Campeonato Uruguayo de Fútbol Sala champions
Venezuela	Caracas	2017 Torneo Superior de Futsal champions

== Venues ==
The tournament was played at the Centro Municipal de Eventos in Carlos Barbosa.

== Draw ==
The draw of the tournament was held on 3 April 2018 at the Centro Municipal de Eventos in Carlos Barbosa. The 12 teams were drawn into three groups of four containing one team from each of the four seeding pots. The following three teams were seeded:

- Group A: 2017 Copa Libertadores de Futsal champions, Carlos Barbosa (Brazil)
- Group B: 2017 Copa Libertadores de Futsal runners-up, Cerro Porteño (Paraguay)
- Group C: champions of the host association, Sorocaba (Brazil)

The other teams were seeded based on the results of their association in the 2017 Copa Libertadores de Futsal, with the additional entry from the host association seeded last.

Seeds	Pot 1	Pot 2	Pot 3
(Brazil) Carlos Barbosa (Group A); (Paraguay) Cerro Porteño (Group B); (Brazil) Sorocaba (Group C)	(Colombia) Leones de Nariño; (Peru) Panta Walon; (Argentina) Boca Juniors	(Ecuador) Società Sportiva Bocca; (Chile) Colo-Colo; (Venezuela) Caracas	(Bolivia) CRE; (Uruguay) Nacional; (Brazil) Joinville

== Squads ==
Each team has to submit a squad of 14 players, including a minimum of two goalkeepers (Regulations Article 31).

== Group stage ==
The top two teams of each group and the two best third-placed teams advance to the quarter-finals. The teams are ranked according to points (3 points for a win, 1 point for a draw, 0 points for a loss). If tied on points, tiebreakers are applied in the following order (Regulations Article 21):

1. Results in head-to-head matches between tied teams (points, goal difference, goals scored);
2. Goal difference in all matches;
3. Goals scored in all matches;
4. Drawing of lots.

All times are local, BRT (UTC−3).

=== Group A ===
Pos	Team	Pld	W	D	L	GF	GA	GD	Pts	Qualification
1	(Brazil) Carlos Barbosa (H)	3	3	0	0	11	3	+8	9	Quarter-finals
2	(Argentina) Boca Juniors	3	2	0	1	13	6	+7	6	Quarter-finals
3	(Bolivia) CRE	3	0	1	2	5	10	−5	1	
4	(Chile) Colo-Colo	3	0	1	2	6	16	−10	1	

Source: CONMEBOL
(H) Hosts
22 April 2018
12:00

Colo-Colo (Chile)	5–5	(Bolivia) CRE
	Report

Centro Municipal de Eventos, Carlos Barbosa
22 April 2018
20:30

Carlos Barbosa (Brazil)	5–3	(Argentina) Boca Juniors
	Report

Centro Municipal de Eventos, Carlos Barbosa

23 April 2018
16:00

Boca Juniors (Argentina)	3–0	(Bolivia) CRE
	Report

Centro Municipal de Eventos, Carlos Barbosa
23 April 2018
20:00

Carlos Barbosa (Brazil)	4–0	(Chile) Colo-Colo
	Report

Centro Municipal de Eventos, Carlos Barbosa

24 April 2018
14:00

Boca Juniors (Argentina)	7–1	(Chile) Colo-Colo
	Report

Centro Municipal de Eventos, Carlos Barbosa
24 April 2018
20:00

CRE (Bolivia)	0–2	(Brazil) Carlos Barbosa
	Report

Centro Municipal de Eventos, Carlos Barbosa

=== Group B ===
Pos	Team	Pld	W	D	L	GF	GA	GD	Pts	Qualification
1	(Brazil) Joinville (H)	3	2	1	0	11	5	+6	7	Quarter-finals
2	(Paraguay) Cerro Porteño	3	2	1	0	11	6	+5	7	Quarter-finals
3	(Venezuela) Caracas	3	1	0	2	7	10	−3	3	Quarter-finals
4	(Peru) Panta Walon	3	0	0	3	2	10	−8	0	

Source: CONMEBOL
(H) Hosts
22 April 2018
14:00

Cerro Porteño (Paraguay)	4–1	(Peru) Panta Walon
	Report

Centro Municipal de Eventos, Carlos Barbosa
22 April 2018
16:00

Caracas (Venezuela)	2–5	(Brazil) Joinville
	Report

Centro Municipal de Eventos, Carlos Barbosa

23 April 2018
10:00

Cerro Porteño (Paraguay)	5–3	(Venezuela) Caracas
	Report

Centro Municipal de Eventos, Carlos Barbosa
23 April 2018
14:00

Panta Walon (Peru)	1–4	(Brazil) Joinville
	Report

Centro Municipal de Eventos, Carlos Barbosa

24 April 2018
12:00

Panta Walon (Peru)	0–2	(Venezuela) Caracas
	Report

Centro Municipal de Eventos, Carlos Barbosa
24 April 2018
18:00

Joinville (Brazil)	2–2	(Paraguay) Cerro Porteño
	Report

Centro Municipal de Eventos, Carlos Barbosa

=== Group C ===
Pos	Team	Pld	W	D	L	GF	GA	GD	Pts	Qualification
1	(Brazil) Sorocaba (H)	3	2	1	0	19	4	+15	7	Quarter-finals
2	(Colombia) Leones de Nariño	3	2	1	0	12	4	+8	7	Quarter-finals
3	(Uruguay) Nacional	3	1	0	2	4	14	−10	3	Quarter-finals
4	(Ecuador) Società Sportiva Bocca	3	0	0	3	2	15	−13	0	

Source: CONMEBOL
(H) Hosts
22 April 2018
10:00

Società Sportiva Bocca (Ecuador)	0–2	(Uruguay) Nacional
	Report

Centro Municipal de Eventos, Carlos Barbosa
22 April 2018
18:00

Sorocaba (Brazil)	2–2	(Colombia) Leones de Nariño
	Report

Centro Municipal de Eventos, Carlos Barbosa

23 April 2018
12:00

Leones de Nariño (Colombia)	4–1	(Uruguay) Nacional
	Report

Centro Municipal de Eventos, Carlos Barbosa
23 April 2018
18:00

Sorocaba (Brazil)	7–1	(Ecuador) Società Sportiva Bocca
	Report

Centro Municipal de Eventos, Carlos Barbosa

24 April 2018
10:00

Leones de Nariño (Colombia)	6–1	(Ecuador) Società Sportiva Bocca
	Report

Centro Municipal de Eventos, Carlos Barbosa
24 April 2018
16:00

Nacional (Uruguay)	1–10	(Brazil) Sorocaba
	Report

Centro Municipal de Eventos, Carlos Barbosa

=== Ranking of third-placed teams ===
Pos	Grp	Team	Pld	W	D	L	GF	GA	GD	Pts	Qualification
1	B	(Venezuela) Caracas	3	1	0	2	7	10	−3	3	Quarter-finals
2	C	(Uruguay) Nacional	3	1	0	2	4	14	−10	3	Quarter-finals
3	A	(Bolivia) CRE	3	0	1	2	5	10	−5	1	

Source: CONMEBOL

== Knockout stage ==
In the quarter-finals, semi-finals and final, extra time and penalty shoot-out are used to decide the winner if necessary. In the third place match, penalty shoot-out (no extra time) is used to decide the winner if necessary.

=== Bracket ===
The quarter-final matchups are:

- QF1: Winner Group A vs. 2nd Best Third Place
- QF2: Winner Group B vs. 1st Best Third Place
- QF3: Winner Group C vs. Runner-up Group A
- QF4: Runner-up Group B vs. Runner-up Group C

The semi-final matchups are:

- SF1: Winner QF1 vs. Winner QF4
- SF2: Winner QF2 vs. Winner QF3

Quarter-finals
26 April
(Brazil) Carlos Barbosa	6
(Uruguay) Nacional	0
26 April
(Paraguay) Cerro Porteño	3
(Colombia) Leones de Nariño	0
26 April
(Brazil) Joinville (p)	3 (5)
(Venezuela) Caracas	3 (4)
26 April
(Brazil) Sorocaba	4
(Argentina) Boca Juniors	3

Semi-finals
28 April
(Brazil) Carlos Barbosa	6
(Paraguay) Cerro Porteño	1
28 April
(Brazil) Joinville	5
(Brazil) Sorocaba	4

Final
29 April
(Brazil) Carlos Barbosa	4
(Brazil) Joinville	1
Third place
29 April
(Paraguay) Cerro Porteño	5
(Brazil) Sorocaba	6

=== Quarter-finals ===
26 April 2018
14:00

Cerro Porteño (Paraguay)	3–0	(Colombia) Leones de Nariño
	Report

Centro Municipal de Eventos, Carlos Barbosa

26 April 2018
16:00

Joinville (Brazil)	3–3 (a.e.t.)	(Venezuela) Caracas
	Report
Penalties
	5–4

Centro Municipal de Eventos, Carlos Barbosa

26 April 2018
18:00

Sorocaba (Brazil)	4–3	(Argentina) Boca Juniors
	Report

Centro Municipal de Eventos, Carlos Barbosa

26 April 2018
20:00

Carlos Barbosa (Brazil)	6–0	(Uruguay) Nacional
	Report

Centro Municipal de Eventos, Carlos Barbosa

=== Semi-finals ===
28 April 2018
11:00

Joinville (Brazil)	5–4	(Brazil) Sorocaba
	Report

Centro Municipal de Eventos, Carlos Barbosa

28 April 2018
13:00

Carlos Barbosa (Brazil)	6–1	(Paraguay) Cerro Porteño
	Report

Centro Municipal de Eventos, Carlos Barbosa

=== Third place match ===
29 April 2018
11:00

Cerro Porteño (Paraguay)	5–6	(Brazil) Sorocaba
	Report

Centro Municipal de Eventos, Carlos Barbosa

=== Final ===
29 April 2018
13:00

Carlos Barbosa (Brazil)	4–1	(Brazil) Joinville
	Report

Centro Municipal de Eventos, Carlos Barbosa
