= 2022 Copa Libertadores de Futsal =

Copa CONMEBOL Libertadores de Futsal Argentina 2022

Tournament details
- Host country: Argentina
- City: Buenos Aires
- Dates: 24 September – 2 October 2022
- Teams: 12 (from 10 associations)
- Venue: 1 (in 1 host city)

Final positions
- Champions: (Brazil) Cascavel (1st title)
- Runners-up: (Uruguay) Peñarol
- Third place: (Argentina) San Lorenzo
- Fourth place: (Paraguay) Cerro Porteño

Tournament statistics
- Matches played: 32
- Goals scored: 149 (4.66 per match)
- Top scorer: (Argentina) Juan Rodríguez (6 goals)

The 2022 Copa CONMEBOL Libertadores de Futsal was the 21st edition of the Copa Libertadores de Futsal, South America's premier club futsal tournament organized by CONMEBOL. The tournament was held in Buenos Aires, Argentina between 24 September and 2 October 2022 (originally scheduled from 30 April to 7 May 2022).

San Lorenzo were the defending champions.

== Teams ==
The competition was contested by 12 teams: the title holders, one entry from each of the ten CONMEBOL associations, plus an additional entry from the host association.

Association	Team	Qualification method
Argentina (hosts)	San Lorenzo (holders)	2021 Copa Libertadores champions.
Argentina (hosts)	Barracas Central	2021 Campeonato Único de Primera División champions.
Argentina (hosts)	Boca Juniors	2021 Campeonato Único de Primera División and 2021 Liga Nacional de Futsal runners-up.
Bolivia	San Martín de Porres	2021 Liga Nacional de Futsal champions.
Brazil	Cascavel	2021 Liga Nacional de Futsal champions.
Chile	Universidad de Chile	2021 Campeonato Futsal Primera champions.
Colombia	Deportivo Meta	2021 Liga Nacional de Futsal champions.
Ecuador	Sportivo Bocca	2021 Liga Nacional de Futsal champions.
Paraguay	Cerro Porteño	2021 Liga Premium de Futsal FIFA champions.
Peru	Panta Walon	2022 Pre-Libertadores tournament winners.
Uruguay	Peñarol	2021 Liga Uruguaya de Fútbol Sala champions.
Venezuela	Bucaneros	2021 Liga FUTVE Futsal 1 champions.

Notes

1. Brazil (BRA): The Brazilian Football Confederation awarded to Cascavel the Brazil berth as winners of the 2021 Liga Nacional de Futsal. Previously, the Brazil berth was awarded to the champions of the Supercopa de Futsal, an event organized by Brazilian Futsal Confederation.
2. Argentina (ARG): The second Argentine berth was originally reserved for the 2021 Liga Nacional de Futsal champions, however, the second berth was awarded to Boca Juniors as Barracas Central were champions in both tournaments that awarded berths to the 2022 Copa Libertadores (2021 Campeonato Único de Primera División and 2021 Liga Nacional de Futsal), and Boca Junior were runners-up in both tournaments.

== Venue ==
The tournament was entirely played at the Microestadio Malvinas Argentinas (also known as Befol Arena), owned by Argentinos Juniors, located in La Paternal neighborhood in Buenos Aires, Argentina.

== Draw ==
The draw of the tournament was held on 29 August 2022, 12:00 PYT (UTC−4). The draw was conducted based on Regulations Article 16 as follows:

Initially, three teams were seeded and assigned to the head of the groups (San Lorenzo automatically to Group A, the others two via a draw from pot 1):

- To Group A: as 2021 Copa Libertadores champions, San Lorenzo (Argentina)
- To Group B: as the first representative of the host association, Barracas Central (Argentina)
- To Group C: as the representative of the runner-up national association of the 2021 Copa Libertadores, Cascavel (Brazil)

The remaining nine teams were split into three pots of three based on the final placement of their national association's club in the previous edition of the championship, with the highest three (Venezuela, Peru and Paraguay) placed in Pot 2, the next three (Colombia, Uruguay and Chile) placed in Pot 3 and the lowest two (Ecuador and Bolivia) in pot 4, alongside the additional Argentine club. From each pot, the first team drawn was placed into Group A, the second team drawn placed into Group B and the final team drawn placed into Group C. Clubs from the same association could not be drawn into the same group.

Pot 1 (seeds)	Pot 2	Pot 3	Pot 4
(Argentina) Barracas Central; (Brazil) Cascavel	(Venezuela) Bucaneros; (Peru) Panta Walon; (Paraguay) Cerro Porteño	(Colombia) Deportivo Meta; (Uruguay) Peñarol; Universidad de Chile	(Ecuador) Sportivo Bocca; (Bolivia) San Martín de Porres; (Argentina) Boca Juniors

The draw resulted in the following groups:

Group A
Pos	Team
A1	(Argentina) San Lorenzo
A2	(Paraguay) Cerro Porteño
A3	Universidad de Chile
A4	(Ecuador) Sportivo Bocca

Group B
Pos	Team
B1	(Brazil) Cascavel
B2	(Peru) Panta Walon
B3	(Uruguay) Peñarol
B4	(Argentina) Boca Juniors

Group C
Pos	Team
C1	(Argentina) Barracas Central
C2	(Venezuela) Bucaneros
C3	(Colombia) Deportivo Meta
C4	(Bolivia) San Martín de Porres

== Squads ==
Each team had to enter a squad of a maximum of 14 and a minimum of 9 players, including at least two goalkeepers (Regulations Article 32).

== Group stage ==
The top two teams of each group and the two best third-placed teams advance to the quarter-finals.

Tiebreakers

Teams are ranked according to points (3 points for a win, 1 point for a draw, 0 points for a loss). If tied on points, tiebreakers are applied in the following order (Regulations Article 21):

1. Results in head-to-head matches between tied teams (points, goal difference, goals scored);
2. Goal difference in all matches;
3. Goals scored in all matches;
4. Fewest red cards received;
5. Fewest yellow cards received;
6. Drawing of lots.

All match times are in PYT (UTC−4), as listed by CONMEBOL.

=== Group A ===
Pos	Team	Pld	W	D	L	GF	GA	GD	Pts	Qualification
1	(Paraguay) Cerro Porteño	3	3	0	0	9	3	+6	9	Knockout stage
2	(Argentina) San Lorenzo (H)	3	2	0	1	7	4	+3	6	Knockout stage
3	(Ecuador) Sportivo Bocca	3	1	0	2	13	7	+6	3	Knockout stage
4	Universidad de Chile	3	0	0	3	4	19	−15	0	Eleventh place play-off

Source: CONMEBOL
Rules for classification: Group stage tiebreakers
(H) Hosts
24 September 2022
10:00

San Lorenzo (Argentina)	3–1	(Ecuador) Sportivo Bocca
Felipe Echavarría; Damián Stazzone; Bernardo Araya	Report	Alfonso Maquensi

Microestadio Malvinas Argentinas, Buenos Aires
Referee: Rolly Rojas (Peru)
24 September 2022
12:00

Cerro Porteño (Paraguay)	5–1	Universidad de Chile
Jorge Espinoza; Yulián ‘Yuyo’ Díaz; Pedro Pascotinni; Arnaldo Báez	Report	Nicolás Lagos

Microestadio Malvinas Argentinas, Buenos Aires
Referee: Anelize Schulz (Brazil)

25 September 2022
18:00

Universidad de Chile	1–3	(Argentina) San Lorenzo
Martín Zúñiga	Report	Julián Caamaño; Juan Rodríguez

Microestadio Malvinas Argentinas, Buenos Aires
Referee: Henrry Gutiérrez (Bolivia)
25 September 2022
20:00

Cerro Porteño (Paraguay)	2–1	(Ecuador) Sportivo Bocca
Arnaldo Báez; Jorge Espinoza	Report	Johao Segura

Microestadio Malvinas Argentinas, Buenos Aires
Referee: Daniel Rodríguez (Uruguay)

Order of matches was reverted from the original schedule.

26 September 2022
12:00

Sportivo Bocca (Ecuador)	11–2	Universidad de Chile
Alfonso Maquensi; Nelson Bello; Bryan Montaño; Claudio Goodridge; Johao Segura; Jireth Alvarado; Jordan Mercado	Report	David Ortiz; Carlo Cerda

Microestadio Malvinas Argentinas, Buenos Aires
Referee: Ulises Ureta (Peru)
26 September 2022
14:00

San Lorenzo (Argentina)	1–2	(Paraguay) Cerro Porteño
Matías Block	Report	Marcos Solís; Fernando De los Santos

Microestadio Malvinas Argentinas, Buenos Aires
Referee: Ricardo Messa (Brazil)

=== Group B ===
Pos	Team	Pld	W	D	L	GF	GA	GD	Pts	Qualification
1	(Brazil) Cascavel	3	3	0	0	8	3	+5	9	Knockout stage
2	(Uruguay) Peñarol	3	1	1	1	5	5	0	4	Knockout stage
3	(Peru) Panta Walon	3	1	0	2	6	7	−1	3	Knockout stage
4	(Argentina) Boca Juniors	3	0	1	2	4	8	−4	1	Eleventh place play-off

Source: CONMEBOL
Rules for classification: Group stage tiebreakers
24 September 2022
14:00

Cascavel (Brazil)	4–1	(Argentina) Boca Juniors
Claudinho; Jorginho; Gessé; Dieguinho	Report	Bruno Ninotti

Microestadio Malvinas Argentinas, Buenos Aires
Referee: Yuri García (Colombia)
24 September 2022
16:00

Panta Walon (Peru)	2–3	(Uruguay) Peñarol
Juan Bastidas; Xavier Tavera	Report	Alejandro Aunchayna; Brandon Díaz; Wilmer Cabarcas

Microestadio Malvinas Argentinas, Buenos Aires
Referee: Christian Espíndola (Chile)

25 September 2022
10:00

Peñarol (Uruguay)	1–2	(Brazil) Cascavel
Juan Custodio	Report	Dieguinho; Ernani

Microestadio Malvinas Argentinas, Buenos Aires
Referee: Bill Villalba (Paraguay)
25 September 2022
12:00

Panta Walon (Peru)	3–2	(Argentina) Boca Juniors
Xavier Tavera; Brayan Mera	Report	Bruno Ninnoti; Franco Martínez Riveras

Microestadio Malvinas Argentinas, Buenos Aires
Referee: Junior Patiño (Venezuela)

26 September 2022
18:00

Cascavel (Brazil)	2–1	(Peru) Panta Walon
Kevin; Edimar	Report	Juan Bastidas

Microestadio Malvinas Argentinas, Buenos Aires
Referee: Yuri García (Colombia)
26 September 2022
20:00

Boca Juniors (Argentina)	1–1	(Uruguay) Peñarol
Juan Pablo Cuello	Report	Brandon Díaz

Microestadio Malvinas Argentinas, Buenos Aires
Referee: Christian Espíndola (Chile)

=== Group C ===
Pos	Team	Pld	W	D	L	GF	GA	GD	Pts	Qualification
1	(Colombia) Deportivo Meta	3	2	1	0	7	5	+2	7	Knockout stage
2	(Argentina) Barracas Central (H)	3	1	1	1	9	7	+2	4	Knockout stage
3	(Venezuela) Bucaneros	3	1	0	2	4	8	−4	3 (Note: Head-to-head result: Bucaneros 1–0 San Martín de Porres.)	Ninth place play-off
4	(Bolivia) San Martín de Porres	3	1	0	2	5	5	0	3	Ninth place play-off

Source: CONMEBOL
Rules for classification: Group stage tiebreakers
(H) Hosts
Notes:
24 September 2022
18:00

Barracas Central (Argentina)	1–3	(Bolivia) San Martín de Porres
Augusto Van de Casteele	Report	José Tangarife; Roberto Guerrero

Microestadio Malvinas Argentinas, Buenos Aires
Referee: Bill Villalba (Paraguay)
24 September 2022
20:00

Bucaneros (Venezuela)	1–2	(Colombia) Deportivo Meta
Greydelvid Terán	Report	Jimerzon Baquero; Yefry Duke

Microestadio Malvinas Argentinas, Buenos Aires
Referee: Daniel Rodríguez (Uruguay)

25 September 2022
14:00

Deportivo Meta (Colombia)	2–2	(Argentina) Barracas Central
Jhonathan Castillo; Yefry Duke	Report	Andrés Terán; Gonzalo Vinocour

Microestadio Malvinas Argentinas, Buenos Aires
Referee: Christian Espíndola (Chile)
25 September 2022
16:00

Bucaneros (Venezuela)	1–0	(Bolivia) San Martín de Porres
Carlos Jiménez	Report

Microestadio Malvinas Argentinas, Buenos Aires
Referee: Rolly Rojas (Peru)

26 September 2022
10:00

Barracas Central (Argentina)	6–2	(Venezuela) Bucaneros
Eneiker Morales (o.g.); Augusto Van de Casteele; Andrés Terán; Martín Dorda; Jerónimo Almeyda	Report	Edwin Bracho; Eneiker Morales

Microestadio Malvinas Argentinas, Buenos Aires
Referee: Daniel Rodríguez (Uruguay)
26 September 2022
12:00

San Martín de Porres (Bolivia)	2–3	(Colombia) Deportivo Meta
Roberto Guerrero; Juan Mesa	Report	Yefry Duke; Juan Asprilla

Microestadio Malvinas Argentinas, Buenos Aires
Referee: Atrid Mendoza (Paraguay)

=== Ranking of third-placed teams ===
Pos	Grp	Team	Pld	W	D	L	GF	GA	GD	Pts	Qualification
1	A	(Ecuador) Sportivo Bocca	3	1	0	2	13	7	+6	3	Knockout stage
2	B	(Peru) Panta Walon	3	1	0	2	6	7	−1	3	Knockout stage
3	C	(Venezuela) Bucaneros	3	1	0	2	4	8	−4	3	Ninth place play-off

Source: CONMEBOL
Rules for classification: 1) Points; 2) Goal difference; 3) Goals scored; 4) Fewest red cards received; 5) Fewest yellow cards received; 6) Draw.

=== Ranking of fourth-placed teams ===
Pos	Grp	Team	Pld	W	D	L	GF	GA	GD	Pts	Qualification
1	C	(Bolivia) San Martín de Porres	3	1	0	2	5	5	0	3	Ninth place play-off
2	B	(Argentina) Boca Juniors	3	0	1	2	4	8	−4	1	Eleventh place play-off
3	A	Universidad de Chile	3	0	0	3	4	19	−15	0	Eleventh place play-off

Source: CONMEBOL
Rules for classification: 1) Points; 2) Goal difference; 3) Goals scored; 4) Fewest red cards received; 5) Fewest yellow cards received; 6) Draw.

== Final stage ==
In the quarter-finals, semi-finals and final, extra time and penalty shoot-out would be used to decide the winner if necessary (no extra time would be used in the play-offs for third to twelfth place) (Regulations Article 22).

All match times are in PYT (UTC−4), except for the final matchday (2 October) which are in PYST (UTC−3).

=== Bracket ===
The quarter-final matchups are:

- QF1: Winner Group A vs. 2nd Best Third Place
- QF2: Winner Group B vs. 1st Best Third Place
- QF3: Winner Group C vs. Runner-up Group A
- QF4: Runner-up Group B vs. Runner-up Group C

The semi-final matchups are:

- SF1: Winner QF1 vs. Winner QF4
- SF2: Winner QF2 vs. Winner QF3

5th place match
1 October
(Peru) Panta Walon	4
(Ecuador) Sportivo Bocca	2
7th place match
1 October
(Argentina) Barracas Central	2
(Colombia) Deportivo Meta	0

5th–8th place semi-finals
29 September
(Peru) Panta Walon (p)	0 (5)
(Argentina) Barracas Central	0 (3)
29 September
(Ecuador) Sportivo Bocca	6
(Colombia) Deportivo Meta	5

Quarterfinals
28 September
(Paraguay) Cerro Porteño	4
(Peru) Panta Walon	1
28 September
(Uruguay) Peñarol (a.e.t.)	4
(Argentina) Barracas Central	2
28 September
(Brazil) Cascavel	5
(Ecuador) Sportivo Bocca	0
28 September
(Colombia) Deportivo Meta	1
(Argentina) San Lorenzo	8

Semifinals
30 September
(Paraguay) Cerro Porteño	0
(Uruguay) Peñarol	2
30 September
(Brazil) Cascavel	2
(Argentina) San Lorenzo	1

Final
2 October
(Uruguay) Peñarol	1
(Brazil) Cascavel	3
3rd place match
2 October
(Paraguay) Cerro Porteño	2
(Argentina) San Lorenzo	4

11th place match
29 September
(Argentina) Boca Juniors	3
Universidad de Chile	2

9th place match
29 September
(Venezuela) Bucaneros	3
(Bolivia) San Martín de Porres	1

=== Quarter-finals ===
28 September 2022
10:00

Cerro Porteño (Paraguay)	4–1	(Peru) Panta Walon
Jorge Espinoza; Pedro Pascotinni; Yulián Díaz	Report	Renzo Ramírez

Microestadio Malvinas Argentinas, Buenos Aires
Referee: Darío Santamaría (Argentina)

28 September 2022
12:00

Cascavel (Brazil)	5–0	(Ecuador) Sportivo Bocca
Kevin; Enanandes; Gessé; Ernani; Edimar	Report

Microestadio Malvinas Argentinas, Buenos Aires
Referee: Rolly Rojas (Peru)

28 September 2022
14:00

Peñarol (Uruguay)	4–2 (a.e.t.)	(Argentina) Barracas Central
Rudimar Venancio; Nicolás Martínez; Mathías Fernández	Report	Marco Politi; Nicolás Rosa

Microestadio Malvinas Argentinas, Buenos Aires
Referee: Yuri García (Colombia)

28 September 2022
16:00

Deportivo Meta (Colombia)	1–8	(Argentina) San Lorenzo
Juan Asprilla	Report	Matías Block; Juan Rodríguez; Tomás Bazán; Julio López

Microestadio Malvinas Argentinas, Buenos Aires
Referee: Christian Espíndola (Chile)

=== Semi-finals ===
==== 5th–8th place ====
29 September 2022
14:00

Sportivo Bocca (Ecuador)	6–5	(Colombia) Deportivo Meta
Andy Guillén; Bryan Montaño; Nelson Bello; Alfonso Maquensi		Jhonathan Castillo; Juan Asprilla; Jimerzon Baquero; Yefry Duque

Microestadio Malvinas Argentinas, Buenos Aires
Referee: Anelize Schulz (Brazil)

29 September 2022
16:00

Panta Walon (Peru)	0–0	(Argentina) Barracas Central
Penalties
Xavier Tavera (penalty scored); Ángel Angulo (penalty scored); Brayan Mera (penalty scored); Renzo Ramírez (penalty scored); Eder Pérez (penalty scored)	5–3	(penalty scored) Martín Dorda; (penalty missed) Oscar Fernández; (penalty scored) Jerónimo Almeyda; (penalty scored) Ángel Muñoz

Microestadio Malvinas Argentinas, Buenos Aires
Referee: Andrés Martínez (Uruguay)

==== 1st–4th place ====
30 September 2022
17:00

Cascavel (Brazil)	2–1	(Argentina) San Lorenzo
Gustavinho; Jhow	Report	Damián Stazzone

Microestadio Malvinas Argentinas, Buenos Aires
Referee: Christian Espíndola (Chile)

30 September 2022
19:00

Cerro Porteño (Paraguay)	0–2	(Uruguay) Peñarol
	Report	Nicolás Martínez; Rudimar ‘Xapa’ Venancio

Microestadio Malvinas Argentinas, Buenos Aires
Referee: Junior Patiño (Venezuela)

=== Finals ===
==== 11th place match ====
29 September 2022
10:00

Boca Juniors (Argentina)	3–2	Universidad de Chile
Juan Pablo Cuello; Cristian Borruto; Ezequiel Ramírez		David Ortiz; Felipe Escobar

Microestadio Malvinas Argentinas, Buenos Aires
Referee: Ulises Ureta (Peru)

==== 9th place match ====
29 September 2022
12:00

Bucaneros (Venezuela)	3–1	(Bolivia) San Martín de Porres
Teryul Rangel; José Landaeta; Ezequiel Ramírez		Roberto Guerrero

Microestadio Malvinas Argentinas, Buenos Aires
Referee: Andrés Pena García (Argentina)

==== 7th place match ====
1 October 2022
11:00

Barracas Central (Argentina)	2–0	(Colombia) Deportivo Meta
Ángel Muñoz; Nicolás Rosa	Report

Microestadio Malvinas Argentinas, Buenos Aires
Referee: Junior Patiño (Venezuela)

==== 5th place match ====
1 October 2022
13:00

Panta Walon (Peru)	4–2	(Ecuador) Sportivo Bocca
Edwar Murillo; Alfredo De Jesús Vidal; Ángel Angulo; Xavier Tavera	Report	Jireth Alvarado; Jordan Mercado

Microestadio Malvinas Argentinas, Buenos Aires
Referee: Nilson Noreña (Colombia)

==== 3rd place match ====
2 October 2022
10:00

Cerro Porteño (Paraguay)	2–4	(Argentina) San Lorenzo
Marcos Solís; Jorge Espinoza	Report	Juan Rodríguez; Agustín del Rey; Julián Caamaño; Dylan Vargas

Microestadio Malvinas Argentinas, Buenos Aires
Referee: Ricardo Messa (Brazil)

==== Final ====
2 October 2022
13:00

Peñarol (Uruguay)	1–3	(Brazil) Cascavel
Nicolás Ordoqui 13'	Report	18', 30', 36' Gessé Gonçalves Rodriguez

Microestadio Malvinas Argentinas, Buenos Aires
Referee: Andrés Pena García (Argentina)

== Final ranking ==
Rank	Team
1st place, gold medalist(s)	(Brazil) Cascavel
2nd place, silver medalist(s)	(Uruguay) Peñarol
3rd place, bronze medalist(s)	(Argentina) San Lorenzo
4	(Paraguay) Cerro Porteño
5	(Peru) Panta Walon
6	(Ecuador) Sportivo Bocca
7	(Argentina) Barracas Central
8	(Colombia) Deportivo Meta
9	(Venezuela) Bucaneros
10	(Bolivia) San Martín de Porres
11	(Argentina) Boca Juniors
12	Universidad de Chile
