= Cascavel Futsal Clube =

Brazilian futsal club

Cascavel
- Full name: Cascavel Futsal Clube
- Founded: 3 January 1991; 35 years ago
- Ground: Ginásio Odilon Reinhardt
- Capacity: 1,800
- Chairman: Jefferson Zini
- Coach: Lucas Vieira Chioro
- League: LNF
- 2022: Overall table: 5th of 22; Playoffs: Semifinals
- Website: https://www.cascavelfutsal.com.br/
colours	colours

Cascavel Futsal Clube is a Brazilian futsal club from Cascavel founded in 1991 which plays in Liga Nacional de Futsal.

== Club honours ==
=== National competitions ===
- Liga Nacional de Futsal (1):2021

=== State competitions ===
- Taça Paraná de Futsal (1): 2013
- Chave Ouro (7): 2003, 2004, 2005, 2011, 2012, 2020, 2021
- Chave Prata (1): 1998
- Jogos Abertos do Paraná (3): 1996, 2014, 2021

=== International competitions ===
- Copa Libertadores de Futsal (2): 2022, 2023

=== Other competitions ===
- Copa TV Naipi de Futsal (1): 2000
- Copa Três Coroas de Futsal (1): 2020

== Current squad ==
As of 22 May 2023

#	Position	Name	Nationality
1	Goalkeeper	Fernando Mamguê	(Brazil)
18	Goalkeeper	Matheus de Lima	(Brazil)
95	Goalkeeper	Obina	(Brazil)
3	Defender	Lucas Selbach	(Brazil)
5	Defender	Willian Dos Santos	(Brazil)
16	Defender	Thales Feitosa	(Georgia (country))
7	Winger	Micuim	(Brazil)
10	Winger	Igor Carioca	(Brazil)
11	Winger	Rabisco	(Brazil)
14	Winger	Natan Minatti	(Brazil)
17	Winger	Zequinha	(Brazil)
30	Winger	Rafael Ernandes	(Brazil)
77	Winger	Jhony	(Brazil)
90	Winger	Gustavinho	(Brazil)
19	Pivot	Jorginho	(Brazil)
22	Pivot	Claudinho	(Brazil)
23	Pivot	Gessé	(Brazil)
