= Kevin Farias =

Brazilian futsal player

Personal information
- Full name: Kevin Aluthgama Farias
- Date of birth: 21 March 1990 (age 36)
- Place of birth: Porto Alegre, Brazil
- Height: 1.73 m (5 ft 8 in)
- Position: Winger

Team information
- Current team: Sorocaba
- Number: 10

Youth career
- 2000–2003: Internacional (football)
- 2003: Porto Futsal
- 2004–2007: GN Gaúcho
- 2008–2010: Carlos Barbosa

Senior career*
Years	Team	Apps	(Gls)
2009–2017	Carlos Barbosa		
2018–	Sorocaba	23	(3)

International career
2018–	Brazil		
- * Club domestic league appearances and goals as of 00:00, 7 March 2019 (UTC)

Kevin Aluthgama Farias (born 21 March 1990) is a Brazilian futsal player who plays as a winger for Sorocaba and the Brazilian national futsal team.
