= Live Arena =

Arena in Tortuguitas, Argentina

- Interactive map of Live Arena
- Former names: DirecTV Arena
- Address: Av. Olivos, Tortuguitas; Argentina
- Owner: Ogden Argentina (IRSA)
- Capacity: 13,500

Construction
- Opened: October 31, 2015
- Closed: 2020
- Reopened: March 15, 2025
- Cost: AR$ 200 million

Live Arena (formerly called DirecTV Arena due to sponsorship reasons) is a multipurpose indoor arena located in the town of Tortuguitas in Buenos Aires, Argentina. It was inaugurated on 31 October 2015 with a concert by Sting.

In February 2018, the company ALG Sports announced the sale to Ogden Argentina, a group led by IRSA.

== History ==
The arena was inaugurated as "DirecTV Arena", which was built through a system of assembly, having capacity for 13,500 seats. For its size and its curved roof structure it is ideal for musical shows, but it can also host matches of tennis or basketball. The agreement signed by ALG with DirecTV is for five years, but with the intention to renew then, explained Matthias Lynch, CEO of ALG. The ground of 11 hectares on which develops the ALG center is leased to Chilean Errazuriz group, at an estimated value of US$1.5 per square meter. The satellite television company brings a sponsorship sum and also make cash outlays in various productions that will stage the new complex. As to the shows that are known to be held in the Arena DirecTV, they are: Sting, Luis Miguel and others.

According to promise strategic partners, the new giant has amenities for both spectators and artists, including a floor area of 10,000 square meters, three meeting rooms and press room, nine areas of baths, 20 dining venues, a full 12 dressing rooms, five-door access, elevator, modular stage and 20 exclusive boxes, among others.

For its size, this stadium was third in size in Latin America, behind Movistar Arena of Santiago, Chile, and Mexico City Arena, Mexico. This type of venues have specific spaces for the development of various shows. They consist of an indoor space, high technology and capacity to accommodate large numbers of spectators. Between the best known internationally Arenas: the Madison Square Garden, in New York; The O2, in London; Bercy Arena, in Paris, and Amsterdam Arena, among others. The DirecTV Arena will work within the ALG Center, located at kilometer 35 of the Pan American Av.

DirecTV remained as a sponsor until 2020.

Following a period of refurbishment, it reopened in March 2025 with a concert by the band The Offspring.

== Entertainment ==
The arena was used for more than just sporting events, with musical acts, family productions and many other events.

Entertainment events at DirecTV Arena
Date(s)	Artist(s)	Event(s)
2015
October 31	Sting	DirecTV Arena Grand Opening
November 14	Axel	—N/a
2016
February 11	Chayanne	—N/a
February 20	La Beriso	—N/a
March 24	Ricky Martin	One World Tour
March 26	Il Volo	Grande Amore Tour
April 1	Marco Antonio Solís	—N/a
April 17	Marc Anthony	Marc Anthony Live!
June 11	Eros Ramazzotti	Perfetto World Tour
June 26	Fifth Harmony	7/27 Tour
October 29	Ricky Martin	One World Tour
November 19	Los Nocheros	—N/a
November 26	Piñón Fijo	—N/a
December 3	Las Pastillas del Abuelo	—N/a
December 11	Maluma	Pretty Boy, Dirty Boy World Tour
2017
May 3	10,000 Maniacs	—N/a
June 2	Valeria Lynch	—N/a
July 5	Ariana Grande	Dangerous Woman Tour
September 21	CeeLo Green	—N/a
September 28	Incubus	8 South America Tour
November 25	Ricardo Arjona	Circo Soledad
November 26	Ricardo Arjona	Circo Soledad
November 29	Ricardo Arjona	Circo Soledad
November 30	Ricardo Arjona	Circo Soledad
December 1	Ricardo Arjona	Circo Soledad
2018
March 14	Liam Gallagher	As You Were Tour
May 23	Harry Styles	Harry Styles: Live on Tour
July 15	Got7	World Tour: Eyes On You 2018
September 8	No Te Va Gustar	Suenan Las Alarmas
October 20	Camila Cabello	Never Be The Same Tour

== See also ==
- List of indoor arenas in Argentina
