= 2014 Copa Libertadores de Futsal =

2014 Copa Libertadores Futsal
- Dates: April 2014

Final positions
- Champions: Atlántico Erechim (1st title)
- Runners-up: Boca Juniors

The 2014 Copa Libertadores de Futsal was the 14th edition of South America's premier club futsal tournament.

== South Zone ==
=== Group A ===
Team	Pld	W	D	L	GF	GA	Pts
(Brazil) Atlantico Erechim	4	4	0	0	24	3	12
(Argentina) America del Sud	4	3	0	1	16	10	9
(Uruguay) Old Christians	4	2	0	2	10	9	6
(Paraguay) Sport Colonial	4	1	0	3	8	20	3
(Chile) Palestino	4	0	0	4	2	18	0

=== Group B ===
Team	Pld	W	D	L	GF	GA	Pts
(Argentina) Boca Juniors	4	3	1	0	18	3	10
(Brazil) Intelli Orlandia	4	3	0	1	22	14	9
(Paraguay) Stars Club	4	1	1	2	16	14	4
(Uruguay) Peñarol	4	1	0	3	13	20	3
(Chile) Deportes Concepción	4	1	0	3	7	25	3

=== Knockout phase ===
Semi-finals
(Argentina) Boca Juniors	4
(Argentina) America	0
(Brazil) A. Erechim	4
(Brazil) Intelli	3

Final
(Argentina) Boca Juniors	2
(Brazil) A. Erechim	3
Third place
(Argentina) America	2
(Brazil) Intelli	7

== North Zone ==
The tournament was not played in the North Zone. Consequently the South Zone tournament proclaimed Champion and Runner on a continental level.
