= 2016 Copa Libertadores de Futsal =

Copa CONMEBOL Libertadores de Futsal Paraguay 2016

Tournament details
- Host country: Paraguay
- City: Asunción
- Dates: 12 – 19 June
- Teams: 10 (from 10 associations)
- Venue: 1 (in 1 host city)

Final positions
- Champions: (Paraguay) Cerro Porteño (1st title)
- Runners-up: (Brazil) Jaraguá
- Third place: (Colombia) Águilas Doradas
- Fourth place: (Argentina) Kimberley

The 2016 Copa Libertadores de Futsal was the 15th edition of the Copa Libertadores de Futsal, South America's premier club futsal tournament organized by CONMEBOL. It was held in Asunción, Paraguay from 12 to 19 June 2016.

It was originally scheduled to be played in La Guaira, Venezuela between 3–9 May 2016, but was later cancelled "for insurmountable force majeure and logistics". The tournament was relocated to be played in Asunción, Paraguay between 12 and 19 June 2016.

== Game system ==
The ten teams were divided into two groups of five, with each team playing a total of four matches. The fifth-placed teams from each group faced each other to determine 9th and 10th place, while the fourth-placed teams met to decide 7th and 8th place. The teams finishing third in each group played each other to determine 5th and 6th place. The top two teams from each group advanced to a direct elimination knockout stage in the semifinals as follows: 1st place Group A vs. 2nd place Group B, and 1st place Group B vs. 2nd place Group A. The winners of each semifinal qualified for the final, while the losers played for 3rd and 4th place.

== Teams ==
Association	Team	Qualification method
Argentina	Kimberley	2015 Copa Julio Grondona champions.
Bolivia	CRE Futsal	2015 Liga Nacional de Futsal champions.
Brazil	Jaraguá	2015 Liga Nacional de Futsal champions.
Chile	Cobresal	2015 Campeonato Nacional de Futsal champions.
Colombia	Águilas Doradas	2015-II Liga Colombiana de Fútbol Sala champions.
Ecuador	Galápagos	2014-2015 Campeonato Nacional Futsal champions.
Paraguay	Cerro Porteño	2015 Liga Premium de Futsal champions.
Peru	Primero de Mayo	2015 División de Honor de Fútbol Sala champions.
Uruguay	Old Christians Colonia	2015 Campeonato Uruguayo de Fútbol Sala champions.
Venezuela	Guerreros del Lago	2015 Torneo Superior de Futsal champions.

== Venue ==
The tournament was held at a single venue, the Polideportivo Sol de América in the Obrero neighborhood of Asunción, Paraguay.

== Group stage ==
=== Group A ===
Equipo	Pts	PJ	PG	PE	PP	GF	GC	DG
Cerro Porteño	12	4	4	0	0	23	5	18
Águilas Doradas	9	4	3	0	1	11	8	3
CRE	4	4	1	1	2	9	12	-3
Cobresal	4	4	1	1	2	11	16	-5
Galápagos	0	4	0	0	4	6	19	-13

Matches

June 12	Asunción	Cobresal	2-3	Águilas Doradas
June 12	Asunción	CRE	1-4	Cerro Porteño
June 13	Asunción	Águilas Doradas	4-3	Galápagos
June 13	Asunción	Cobresal	1-7	Cerro Porteño
June 14	Asunción	Cobresal	5-5	CRE
June 14	Asunción	Cerro Porteño	9-2	Galápagos
June 15	Asunción	CRE	3-0	Galápagos
June 15	Asunción	Águilas Doradas	1-3	Cerro Porteño
June 16	Asunción	Águilas Doradas	3-0	CRE
June 16	Asunción	Cobresal	3-1	Galápagos

=== Group B ===
Equipo	Pts	PJ	PG	PE	PP	GF	GC	DG
Jaraguá	12	4	4	0	0	12	4	8
Kimberley	7	4	2	1	1	10	8	2
Primero de Mayo	6	4	2	0	2	9	10	-1
Old Christians	4	4	1	1	2	10	9	1
Guerreros del Lago	0	4	0	0	4	8	18	-10

Matches

June 12	Asunción	Old Christians	1-1	Kimberley
June 12	Asunción	Primero de Mayo	3-1	Guerreros del Lago
June 13	Asunción	Old Christians	5-2	Guerreros del Lago
June 13	Asunción	Jaraguá	1-0	Kimberley
June 14	Asunción	Jaraguá	5-1	Guerreros del Lago
June 14	Asunción	Old Christians	2-3	Primero de Mayo
June 15	Asunción	Primero de Mayo	1-3	Jaraguá
June 15	Asunción	Kimberley	5-4	Guerreros del Lago
June 16	Asunción	Kimberley	4-2	Primero de Mayo
June 16	Asunción	Jaraguá	3-2	Old Christians

== 9th place match ==
18 June 2016
09:00

Guerreros del Lago (Venezuela)	6–4	(Ecuador) Galápagos
	Report

Polideportivo Sol de América, Asunción
Referee: Hugo Camargo (Colombia)

== 7th place match ==
18 June 2016
11:00

Cobresal (Chile)	4–4	(Uruguay) Old Christians Colonia
	Report
Penalties
	5–3

Polideportivo Sol de América, Asunción
Referee: Gean Telles (Brazil)

== 5th place match ==
18 June 2016
13:00

CRE Futsal (Bolivia)	7–1	(Peru) Primero de Mayo
	Report

Polideportivo Sol de América, Asunción
Referee: José Villar (Venezuela)

== Semifinals ==
18 June 2016
15:00

Jaraguá (Brazil)	4–0	(Colombia) Águilas Doradas
	Report

Polideportivo Sol de América, Asunción
Referee: Andrés Martínez (Uruguay)
18 June 2016
17:00

Cerro Porteño (Paraguay)	2–1	(Argentina) Kimberley
	Report

Polideportivo Sol de América, Asunción
Referee: Christian Espíndola (Chile)

== 3rd place match ==
19 June 2016
17:00

Águilas Doradas (Colombia)	2–1	(Argentina) Kimberley
	Report

Polideportivo Sol de América, Asunción
Referee: Henry Gutiérrez (Bolivia)

== Final ==
19 June 2016
19:00

Cerro Porteño (Paraguay)	4–2	(Brazil) Jaraguá
	Report

Polideportivo Sol de América, Asunción
Referee: Daniel Rodríguez (Uruguay)

== Individual awards ==
The President of the Paraguayan Football Association, Robert Harrison, presented the trophies and medals to the champions and runners-up, as well as the other awards to the players and officials included in the tournament's honors list.

- Fair Play:
  - Águilas Doradas (Colombia)
- Best Defensive Record:
  - Gabriel Giménez (Cerro Porteño)
- Top Scorer:
  - Juan Salas (Cerro Porteño)
- Best Coach:
  - José Sánchez (Cerro Porteño)
