= Microestadio Malvinas Argentinas =

Indoor arena in Buenos Aires, Argentina

Malvinas Argentinas Arena
- Estadio Cubierto Malvinas Argentinas
- Interactive map of Malvinas Argentinas Arena
- Location: La Paternal, Buenos Aires, Argentina
- Owner: Argentinos Juniors
- Capacity: 6,000 (Basketball); 7,500–9,000 (concert)
- Type: Arena
- Surface: 8,500 m^{2}
- Field size: 44 × 22 m

Construction
- Opened: 2006; 20 years ago

The Estadio Cubierto Malvinas Argentinas is an indoor arena in La Paternal, Buenos Aires. Its construction began in the 1980s but it was completed and officially inaugurated only in 2006, and belongs to Argentinos Juniors club. Even though some basketball and volleyball matches are played at the stadium, it is mostly used for concerts. It also hosted the 2023 Copa América Femenina de Futsal.

Among others some bands that have played at this venue are Big Time Rush, Limp Bizkit, Korn, Die Toten Hosen, Paramore, Bad Religion, The Offspring, Fall Out Boy, Simple Plan, Creed, Demi Lovato, Placebo, Megadeth, Babasonicos, Manu Chao, Nightwish, Tarja Turunen, Avril Lavigne, Franz Ferdinand, SOJA, Slash, Black Label Society, Rata Blanca and Almafuerte. It has also hosted the Nickelodeon Argentina Kids' Choice Awards since 2011.

The name reflects Argentina's claims of sovereignty over the Falkland Islands (Islas Malvinas in Spanish).

The stadium can be reached by Urquiza Line, at Arata station, by San Martín Line, at La Paternal station, or by nearby Line B, at Tronador-Villa Ortúzar station.

In 2023 the Argentine Football Association announced that the stadium would be one of the venues for Copa América de Futsal Femenina.
