= Tortuguitas =

- City
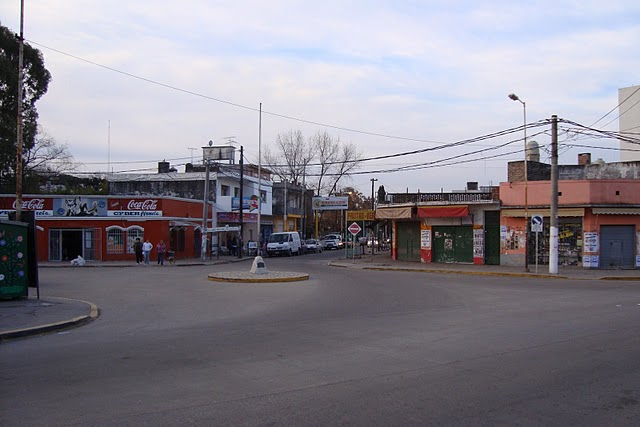

- Location in Greater Buenos Aires
- Coordinates: 34°28′30″S 58°45′20″W
- Country: Argentina
- Province: Buenos Aires
- Partido: Malvinas Argentinas
- established: 1947
- Elevation: 20 m (66 ft)

Population (2001 census [INDEC])
  - Total: 41,390
- CPA Base: B 1667
- Area code: +54 2320

Tortuguitas is a city in Greater Buenos Aires, Argentina, located 40 kilometres (25 mi) northwest of Buenos Aires. The city is located in Malvinas Argentinas Partido (county), and its population was 41,390 inhabitants as of the 2001 Census.

Part of a vast estancia in colonial times owned by Alonso de Escobar, the land was bought in 1925 by the Blas País family when the Córdoba Central Railway was built though the area in 1925. The establishment of the Tortugas Country Club by Antonio Maura in 1930 was followed by a stop nearby along the line known simply as Apeadero km 40 (Km. 40 Stop). The stop was upgraded as a station along the General Belgrano Railway on June 9, 1947.

The Blas País family began selling lots to developers as early as 1942, and the numerous dairy farms in the area were gradually developed into residential subdivisions that gave Tortuguitas its bedroom community character. Despite being located near the northwest end of the Greater Buenos Aires metro area, Tortuguitas benefited from direct access to the city via Route 8, which was converted into a freeway in the 1980s. This also promoted the development of a sizable manufacturing base in the eastern end of Tortuguitas, along Route 8.

The 88 hectares (220 acres) Tortuguitas Industrial Park, formally designated in 1999, includes the local affiliates of BASF, GE Plastics, and Unilever, as well as Molinos Río de la Plata's Lucchetti pasta plant. The contiguous El Triángulo District includes among others the SKF Argentina plant (1972) and the Tortugas Open Mall (2010). In 2015, the DirecTV Arena, Argentina's largest, opened in the city.
