= Joinville Futsal =

Brazilian futsal club

JEC Krona Futsal
- Full name: Joinville Esporte Clube / Associação Desportiva Recreativa Krona
- Founded: 2006
- Ground: Centreventos Cau Hansen
- Capacity: 3,500
- Chairman: Valdicir Kortmann
- Manager: Cassiano Klein
- League: LNF
- 2022: Overall table: 2nd of 22; Playoffs: Quarterfinals
colours	colours

JEC Krona Futsal, also known as Joinville or Krona Futsal, is a Brazilian futsal club from Joinville, Santa Catarina. Founded in 2006 it has won one Liga Nacional de Futsal and six Campeonato Catarinense de Futsal. The team is a partnership between the sports club Joinville Esporte Clube and Krona Tubos e Conexões.

== Club honours ==
=== National competitions ===
- Liga Nacional de Futsal (1): 2017
- Taça Brasil de Futsal (3): 2011, 2017, 2022
- Superliga de Futsal (1): 2012
- Supercopa do Brasil de Futsal (1): 2023

=== State competitions ===
- Campeonato Catarinense de Futsal (8): 2009, 2010, 2012, 2013, 2014, 2017, 2020, 2023
- Copa Santa Catarina de Futsal (1): 2022
- Recopa Santa Catarina de Futsal (3): 2014, 2021, 2023
- Jogos Abertos de Santa Catarina (5): 2005, 2006, 2012, 2013, 2014

=== Regional competitions ===
- Copa Cataratas de Futsal (1): 2013
- Copa Gramado de Futsal (1): 2023

== Current squad ==
As of 27 May 2023

#	Position	Name	Nationality
3	Goalkeeper	Willian Dorn	(Brazil)
25	Goalkeeper	Pato	(Brazil)
92	Goalkeeper	Deivão	(Brazil)
2	Defender	Leo Jaraguá	(Kazakhstan)
8	Defender	Ernani de Oliveira	(Brazil)
11	Defender	Henrique Gonçalves	(Brazil)
18	Defender	João Silveira	(Brazil)
55	Defender	Rafinha	(Brazil)
71	Defender	Fernando Drasler	(Georgia (country))
10	Winger	Kevin Farias	(Brazil)
13	Winger	Gabriel Gurgel	(Brazil)
20	Winger	Xuxa	(Brazil)
21	Winger	Renatinho	(Brazil)
22	Winger	Gabi	(Brazil)
77	Winger	Gabriel Penézio	(Brazil)
90	Winger	Anjinho	(Brazil)
5	Pivot	Éder Lima	(Russia)
7	Pivot	Roni	(Brazil)
9	Pivot	Vini	(Brazil)

== See also ==
- Joinville Esporte Clube
