= Magnus Futsal =

Brazilian futsal club

- Full name: Magnus Sorocaba Futsal-Athleta
- Founded: January 2014
- Ground: Arena Sorocaba
- Capacity: 4.263
- Chairman: Fellipe Drommond
- Coach: Ricardinho
- League: LNF
- 2023: Overall table: 3rd of 22; Playoffs: Semifinalist
colours	colours

Magnus Futsal, previously known as Sorocaba Futsal, is a Brazilian futsal club from Sorocaba, São Paulo. Founded in January, 2014 it has won two Liga Nacional de Futsal, two Liga Paulista de Futsal and two Copa Libertadores de Futsal.

== History ==
Sorocaba Futsal was founded in January 2014 as Futsal Brasil Kirin after their first sponsor Brasil Kirin. In their first season Sorocaba won the Liga Nacional de Futsal and the Liga Paulista de Futsal.

In 2016 Sorocaba changed to a new sponsor and adopted the name Magnus Futsal after them.

== Club honours ==
=== National competitions ===
- Liga Nacional de Futsal (2): 2014, 2020
- Taça Brasil de Futsal (1): 2021
- Supercopa do Brasil de Futsal (2): 2018, 2021

=== State competitions ===
- Liga Paulista de Futsal (2): 2014, 2017
- Campeonato Paulista de Futsal (3): 2020, 2021, 2022

=== International competitions ===
- Intercontinental Futsal Cup (3): 2016, 2018, 2019
- Copa Libertadores de Futsal (2): 2015, 2024

== Current squad ==
As of 28 May 2023

#	Position	Name	Nationality
2	Goalkeeper	Françoar Rodrigues	(Brazil)
3	Goalkeeper	Kelvin Oliveira	(Brazil)
4	Defender	Lucas Gomes	(Brazil)
5	Defender	Gabriel Ferro	(Brazil)
14	Defender	Rodrigo Araújo	(Brazil)
8	Winger	Ricardinho	(Brazil)
10	Winger	Leandro Lino	(Brazil)
11	Winger	Dieguinho	(Brazil)
17	Winger	Gabriel Pereira	(Brazil)
27	Winger	Ernesto Gris	(Brazil)
77	Winger	João Pinda	(Brazil)
88	Winger	Pepita	(Brazil)
9	Pivot	Charuto	(Brazil)
16	Pivot	Genaro Soares	(Brazil)
31	Pivot	Bruninho	(Brazil)
99	Pivot	Elisandro Gomes	(Georgia (country))
