= Time in Paraguay =

Paraguay observes UTC−03:00 year-round. Until 2024, it observed UTC−04:00 for standard time (PYT) and UTC−03:00 for daylight saving time / summer time (PYST).

== Daylight saving time ==
Paraguay used to observe DST under decree 1867 of March 5, 2004. DST ended on the third Sunday of March and started on the first Sunday of October. In 2010, Paraguay changed its own DST rules because of the energy crisis, ending DST on the second Sunday in April, a month later than previous years. In 2013 Paraguay changed the ending date of daylight saving to the fourth Sunday in March. The starting date remains unchanged.

On 5 August 2020, an initiative arose to keep the daylight saving time as the official year-round time, with the intention to align Paraguay with neighbors Argentina, Brazil and Uruguay. Legislative efforts to achieve this continued unsuccessfully until a law was passed by the Congress of Paraguay in September 2024.

To avoid confusion, the timezone continues to be referred to as PYST.

== See also ==
- Daylight saving time by country
