= Lavoisier (futsal player) =

Brazilian futsal player

Personal information
- Full name: Lavoisier Freire Martins
- Date of birth: 27 March 1974 (age 52)
- Place of birth: Ocara, Brazil
- Height: 1.66 m (5 ft 5 in)
- Position: Goalkeeper

Youth career
- Sumov Fortaleza

Senior career*
Years	Team	Apps	(Gls)
1988–1996	Sumov Fortaleza		
1996–1998	Tio Sam		
1998–2000	Vasco da Gama		
2001–2005	Carlos Barbosa		
2006	Intelli		
2007–2008	Ulbra Canoas		
2009–2012	Carlos Barbosa		

International career
1995–2004	Brazil		
- * Club domestic league appearances and goals

Lavoisier Freire Martins (born 27 March 1974), simply known as Lavoisier, is a Brazilian retired professional futsal player who played as a goalkeeper.

== Career ==
Born in Ocara, Ceará, Lavoisier began his career early, at the age of 14 for Sumov Fortaleza, where he played until 1996. He arrived in the Brazil futsal team despite being criticized due to his short height, and made history by playing more than 150 matches. He also became an idol of Carlos Barbosa, where he played more than 700 matches, and where he ended his career in 2012.

== Honours ==
Sumov/Fortaleza

- Campeonato Cearense de Futsal: 1991, 1992, 1993, 1994, 1995, 1996

Tio Sam

- Campeonato Carioca de Futsal: 1997

Vasco da Gama

- Liga Nacional de Futsal: 2000
- Taça Brasil de Futsal: 2000

Carlos Barbosa

- Intercontinental Futsal Cup: 2004
- Torneo Sudamericano de Clubes de Futsal: 2002, 2003
- Liga Nacional de Futsal: 2001, 2004
- Taça Brasil de Futsal: 2001, 2009
- Campeonato Gaúcho de Futsal: 2002, 2004, 2009, 2010

Brazil

- Copa América de Futsal: 1995, 1996, 1998, 1999
- Futsal Mundialito: 1996, 1998, 2001
- Tiger Beer Cup: 1999
- Torneio Internacional do Fundão: 2001
- Macau Cup: 2004
