= Supercopa do Brasil de Futsal =

- Organiser(s): Brazilian Futsal Confederation
- Founded: 2016; 10 years ago
- Region: Brazil
- Teams: 6
- Current champions: Magnus Futsal (4th title)
- Most championships: Magnus Futsal (4 titles)
- Website: cbfs.com.br

The Supercopa do Brasil de Futsal (English: Brazilian Futsal Super Cup) is an annual futsal competition organized by the Brazilian Futsal Confederation (CBFS). It brings together the finalists of the Campeonato Brasileño de Futsal, the finalists of Copa do Brasil de Futsal, the champions of Taça Brasil de Futsal and the Rigional Champions Cup winners to determine Brazil's representative in the Copa Libertadores de Futsal.

The inaugural edition was held in 2016 in Jaraguá do Sul, Santa Catarina. The host club, AD Jaraguá, became the first champion by defeating Carlos Barbosa in the final.

== Participants ==
- Campeonato Brasileño de Futsal champion and runner-up.
- Taça Brasil de Futsal champion and runner-up.
- Copa de Brasil de Futsal champion.
- Copa dos Campeões Regionais champion.

== Editions ==
#	Year	Host	Final		
#	Year	Host	Champion	Result	Runner-up
1	2016	Jaraguá do Sul	Jaraguá	2 – 2 (3 – 2 pen.)	Carlos Barbosa
2	2017	Carlos Barbosa	Carlos Barbosa	2 – 1	Corinthians
3	2018	Sorocaba	Magnus Futsal	3 – 0	Atlântico
4	2019	Francisco Beltrão	Corinthians	4 – 2	Marreco Futsal
5	2020	Erechim	Corinthians	1 - 1 (5 - 4 pen.)	Pato Futsal
6	2021	Sorocaba	Magnus Futsal	5 - 1	Minas
7	2023	Maracajú	Joinville	4 - 1	Magnus Futsal
8	2024	Jaraguá do Sul	Magnus Futsal	5 - 1	Praia Clube
9	2025	Joinville	Joinville	3 - 2	Atlântico
10	2026	Erechim	Magnus Futsal	4 - 2	Atlântico

== Titles by team ==
Team	Champion	Years	Runner-up	Years
Magnus (Sorocaba)	4	2018, 2021, 2024, 2026	1	2023
Corinthians (São Paulo)	2	2019, 2020	1	2017
Joinville (Joinville)	2	2023, 2025	0	–
Carlos Barbosa (Carlos Barbosa)	1	2017	1	2016
Jaraguá (Jaraguá do Sul)	1	2016	0	–
Atlântico (Erechim)	0	–	3	2018, 2025, 2026
Marreco Futsal (Francisco Beltrão)	0	–	1	2019
Pato Futsal (Pato Branco)	0	–	1	2020
Minas (Belo Horizonte)	0	–	1	2021
Praia Clube (Uberlândia)	0	–	1	2024

== Titles by state ==
Estado	Títulos
São Paulo	6
Santa Catarina	3
Río Grande del Sur	1

== See also ==
- Copa Libertadores de Futsal
- Taça Brasil de Futsal
