= Fininho (futsal player) =

Brazilian futsal player and futsal manager

Personal information
- Full name: Paulo Sérgio Lira Goés
- Date of birth: 6 July 1972 (age 54)
- Place of birth: João Pessoa, Paraíba, Brazil
- Height: 1.78 m (5 ft 10 in)
- Position: Winger

Senior career*
| Years | Team | Apps | (Gls) |
| 1990–1992 | SE Votorantim | | |
| 1993 | Sumov Fortaleza | | |
| 1994 | Inpacel Futsal | | |
| 1995 | Arsenal-MG | | |
| 1996 | Enxuta Futsal | | |
| 1997 | Vasco da Gama | | |
| 1997 | Carlos Barbosa | | |
| 1998–2000 | São Paulo | | |
| 2001–2004 | Carlos Barbosa | | |
| 2007 | Umuarama | | |
| 2011 | Arapoti | | |
| 2011–2012 | Augusta 1986 | | |

International career
| 1992–2004 | Brazil | | |
- * Club domestic league appearances and goals as of 13 September 2024

Paulo Sérgio Lira Goés (born 6 July 1972), simply known as Fininho, is a Brazilian retired professional futsal player who played as a winger, and a futsal manager.

== Career ==
Born in João Pessoa, Paraíba, Fininho began his career playing for SE Votorantim in Recife. He gained national recognition playing for Enxuta Futsal, from Caxias do Sul, where he won the Taça Brasil in 1996. Later, still in futsal in Rio Grande do Sul, he won several titles with Carlos Barbosa, in addition to a state title with São Paulo FC.

For the Brazilian futsal team, he competed in 4 FIFA Futsal World Cups, being champion in 1992 and 1996, runner-up in 2000 and third place in 2004, scoring 254 goals in total. He also won three editions of the Copa América de Futsal.

After retiring as a player, Fininho became a futsal coach, working especially for Carlos Barbosa, the team with which he created greater identification, and Toledo Fustal. In 2023 he coached the Concórdia team in the National League.

== Honours ==
Below is the total list of achievements of Fininho as a professional futsal player:

SE Votorantim

- Campeonato Pernambucano de Futsal: 1990, 1991, 1992

Sumov/Fortaleza

- Campeonato Cearense de Futsal: 1993

Inpacel Futsal

- Taça Brasil de Futsal: 1994

Arsenal de Santa Luzia

- Campeonato Mineiro de Futsal: 1995

Enxuta

- Taça Brasil de Futsal: 1996

Carlos Barbosa

- Intercontinental Futsal Cup: 2004
- Torneo Sudamericano de Clubes de Futsal: 2002, 2003
- Liga Nacional de Futsal: 1997, 2004
- Campeonato Gaúcho de Futsal: 1996, 1997, 2002, 2004

São Paulo

- Campeonato Paulista de Futsal (FPFS): 1999

Umuarama

- Campeonato Paranaense de Futsal: 2007

Brazil

- FIFA Futsal World Cup: 1992, 1996
- Copa América de Futsal: 1997, 1998, 1999
- Futsal Mundialito: 1995, 1996, 1998, 2001
