= Liga Futsal 2011 =

Brazilian futsal league

The Liga Futsal 2011 was the premier futsal league in Brazil, was the 16th edition and organized by the Brazilian Futsal Confederation (CBFS).

== Teams ==
- (São Paulo (state)) Santos
- (São Paulo (state)) São Paulo
- (São Paulo (state)) São Caetano/Corinthians
- (São Paulo (state)) Suzano
- (São Paulo (state)) São José
- (São Paulo (state)) Orlândia
- (Rio Grande do Sul) Carlos Barbosa
- (Rio Grande do Sul) Assoeva
- (Rio Grande do Sul) Atlântico
- (Paraná (state)) Copagril / Faville
- (Paraná (state)) Diplomata / Cascavel
- (Paraná (state)) Colégio Londrinense
- (Paraná (state)) Gazin
- (Santa Catarina (state)) Joinville / Krona
- (Santa Catarina (state)) Florianópolis Futsal
- (Santa Catarina (state)) Concórdia
- (Santa Catarina (state)) Unisul
- (Minas Gerais) V&M Minas
- (Minas Gerais) Praia Clube
- (Rio de Janeiro (state)) Macaé Sports
- (Rio de Janeiro (state)) Poker
- (Federal District (Brazil)) Peixe Futsal
- (Goiás) Anápolis

== The Championship ==
=== First phase ===
	Team	Pts	P	W	D	L	GF	GA	DG	Yellow card	Red card
1	Santos/Cortiana	57	22	18	3	1	88	49	39	36	4
2	Carlos Barbosa	54	22	17	3	2	84	38	46	27	0
3	Intelli/Orlândia	41	22	13	2	7	73	56	17	30	2
4	Krona/Joinville/DalPonte	39	22	12	3	7	72	51	21	41	2
5	Diplomata/Muffatão/Cvel	37	22	11	4	7	78	58	20	38	6
6	São José/ValeSul Shopping	37	22	11	4	7	68	55	13	33	6
7	Gazin/Oi/Penalty	37	22	10	7	5	55	49	6	31	5
8	Copagril/Faville/DalPonte	35	22	11	2	9	44	31	13	22	3
9	Atlântico Apti UriErechim	35	22	10	5	7	64	54	10	40	6
10	Poker/PEC	32	22	10	2	10	79	76	3	37	7
11	São Caetano/Corinthians	31	22	8	7	7	49	49	0	30	2
12	V&M Minas	27	22	8	3	11	62	70	-8	36	4
13	Florianópolis FutSal	27	22	7	6	9	43	47	-4	28	2
14	Hipper Freios/Unisul	27	22	7	6	9	54	64	-10	36	3
15	Peixe/Mazza	26	22	8	2	12	61	72	-11	33	2
16	Suzano/Drummond/Penalty	26	22	6	8	8	55	59	-4	29	3
17	Macaé Sports	25	22	7	4	11	50	59	-9	29	4
18	São Paulo/Marília/Construban	25	22	7	4	11	63	74	-11	41	3
19	Assoeva/Unisc/ALM	25	22	7	4	11	52	65	-13	29	0
20	Praia/Pepsi/Velox	24	22	7	3	12	40	68	-28	43	1
21	Colégio Londrinense/Sercomtel	23	22	5	8	9	66	79	-13	37	2
22	Concórdia/Umbro	20	22	6	2	14	54	72	-18	36	1
23	Anápolis Futsal/SuperBolla	02	22	0	2	20	39	98	-59	36	2

Qualified Grupo A	Qualified Grupo B	Qualified Grupo C	Qualified Grupo D	Eliminated

== Second phase ==
=== Group A ===
	Team	Pts	P	W	D	L	GF	GA	DG	Yellow card	Red card
1	Copagril/Faville/DalPonte	13	6	4	1	1	19	12	7	8	0
2	Santos/Cortiana	13	6	4	1	1	25	11	14	11	0
3	V&M Minas	6	6	2	0	4	13	20	-7	11	0
4	Suzano/Drummond/Penalty	3	6	1	0	5	8	22	-14	10	1

Qualified Knockout phase	Eliminated

=== Group B ===
	Team	Pts	P	W	D	L	GF	GA	DG	Yellow card	Red card
1	Carlos Barbosa	16	6	5	1	0	21	10	11	9	0
2	São Caetano/Corinthians	9	6	2	3	1	14	11	3	9	0
3	Gazin/Oi/Penalty	6	6	1	3	2	13	16	-3	5	0
4	Peixe/Mazza	1	6	0	1	5	10	21	-11	12	0

Qualified Knockout phase	Eliminated

=== Grupo C ===
	Team	Pts	P	W	D	L	GF	GA	DG	Yellow card	Red card
1	São José/ValeSul Shopping	13	6	4	1	1	18	17	1	11	1
2	Intelli/Orlândia	9	6	2	3	1	28	19	9	20	1
3	Poker/PEC	6	6	1	3	2	17	18	-1	14	3
4	Hipper Freios/Unisul	4	6	1	1	4	14	23	-9	11	1

Qualified Knockout phase	Eliminated

=== Grupo D ===
	Team	Pts	P	W	D	L	GF	GA	DG	Yellow card	Red card
1	Diplomata/Muffatão/Cvel	11	6	3	2	1	16	12	4	11	1
2	Florianópolis Futsal	9	6	2	3	1	10	10	0	18	0
3	Krona/Joinville/DalPonte	8	6	2	2	2	16	13	3	14	1
4	Atlântico/Erechim	3	6	0	3	3	13	20	-7	14	1

Qualified Knockout phase	Eliminated

== Knockout phase ==
Quarterfinals
1	Santos	6	2
8	Diplomata	1	2
5	Florianópolis	2	3
4	Copagril	1	2
3	São Caetano/Corinthians	2	3
6	São José	1	1
7	Orlândia	6	2
2	Carlos Barbosa	6	3

Semifinals
Santos	6	1
Florianópolis	0	1
São Caetano/Corinthians	1	4
Carlos Barbosa	6	4

Final
Santos	3	4
Carlos Barbosa	3 (7)	2 (6)

Liga Futsal 2011
(São Paulo (state))
Santos FC
(1st title)
