= Valdin =

Brazilian futsal player

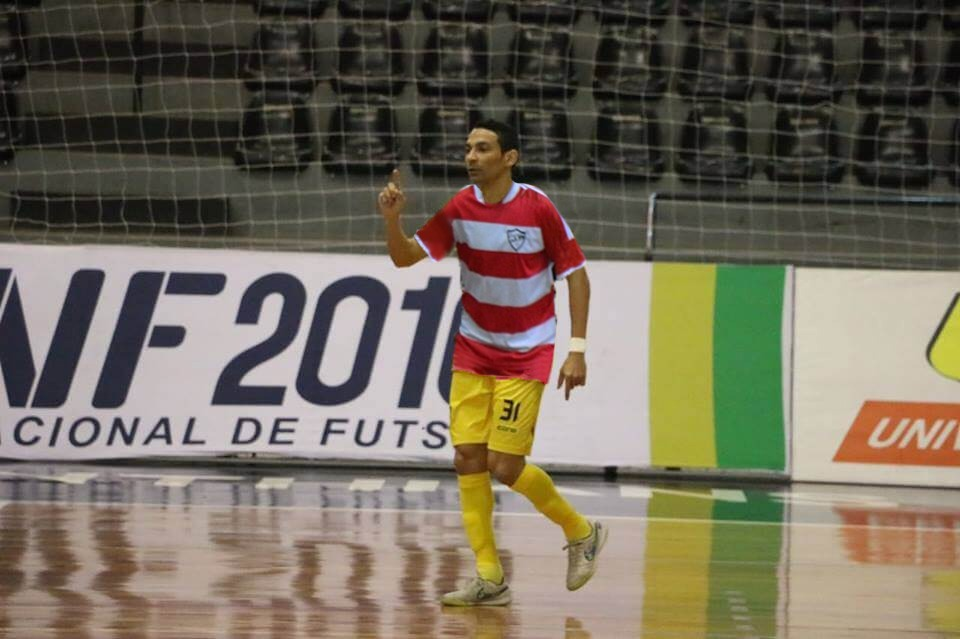

Personal information
- Full name: João Batista do Nascimento Carvalho
- Date of birth: 23 June 1979 (age 47)
- Place of birth: Fortaleza, Brazil
- Height: 1.68 m (5 ft 6 in)
- Positions: Winger; Pivot

Team information
- Current team: URCA JN
- Number: 13

Senior career*
Years	Team	Apps	(Gls)
–2002	Sumov		
2002–2003	Camocim		
2004	Palmeiras (GO)		
2005–2007	Jaraguá		
2007–2009	AFF		
2010	Jaraguá		
2011	Santos		
2012–2014	Joinville		
2015	Corinthians		
2016–2017	Assoeva	45	(14)
2018–	Carlos Barbosa	15	(5)

International career
2005–	Brazil		
- * Club domestic league appearances and goals as of 00:00, 7 March 2019 (UTC)

João Batista do Nascimento Carvalho (born 23 June 1979), known as Valdin, is a Brazilian futsal player who plays as a winger for Esporte Clube URCA JN and the Brazilian national futsal team. Valdin holds the record of the most goals scored in a single international game, when he scored 20 goals in a 76-0 win over Timor-Leste in the 2006 Lusophony Games.
