= Keké (futsal player) =

Brazilian futsal player

Personal information
- Full name: Clayton Lima Szabo
- Date of birth: 24 November 1982 (age 43)
- Place of birth: São Paulo, Brazil
- Height: 1.81 m (5 ft 11 in)
- Position: Pivot

Team information
- Current team: Intelli
- Number: 11

Senior career*
Years	Team	Apps	(Gls)
2006–2008	Corinthians		
2009	São José		
2010	Corinthians		
2011	São José		
2012	Joinville		
2013–2018	Atlântico	≥67	(≥46)
2019	Intelli	20	(10)
2019	Assoeva	14	(4)

International career
2017–	Brazil		
- * Club domestic league appearances and goals as of 17:30, 4 May 2021 (UTC)

Clayton Lima Szabo (born 24 November 1982), commonly known as Keké, is a Brazilian futsal player who plays as a pivot for Assoeva and the Brazilian national futsal team.
