= Liga Nacional de Futsal =

Brazilian sports league

- Founded: 1996; 30 years ago
- Country: Brazil
- Confederation: CONMEBOL
- Number of clubs: 24
- Level on pyramid: 1
- Domestic cup: Supercopa do Brasil de Futsal
- Current champions: (Santa Catarina (state)) Jaraguá (6th title)
- Most championships: (Santa Catarina (state)) Jaraguá (6 titles)
- Broadcaster(s): TV Brasil / SporTV
- Website: lnfoficial.com.br
- Current: 2026 LNF

The Liga Nacional de Futsal (LNF) (English: National Futsal League) is the premier futsal league in Brazil, and was created in 1996 with the purpose of setting up a championship with the best futsal teams of the country, corresponding to the Brazilian Football Championship Série A. It is organized by the Brazilian Futsal Confederation (CBFS).

The winner (and sometimes the runner-up) qualifies to the Supercopa do Brasil de Futsal.

== The Championship ==
=== History ===
The league was created in 1996, with the aim to improve the most important Brazilian clubs and help the growth of the sport in the country. The league was inspired by the American basketball league (NBA). On April 27, 1996, the Liga Futsal started.

=== Franchise system ===
To be eligible to participate in the league, there are three options available: buy a franchise, be appointed by a company which owns a franchise, or be invited by the league. It is necessary to send a proposal to the Liga Futsal, which will analyze and decide if the team's participation will be accepted, in a general assembly involving all the franchise representatives. Currently, a franchise is worth R$300,000.00.

=== Prize money ===
In 2007 the total prize money was R$75,000.00. The winner, besides being awarded R$50,000.00 (the runner-up was awarded R$25,000.00), won a scudetto, created by the CBFS and represented Brazil in two international competitions (South American Club Futsal Championship and Intercontinental Futsal Cup). The competition organizers also reserved R$1,237 million to cover expenses such as transportation, accommodation, food provision and referee taxes for the clubs which participated at least two times in the competition.

== Clubs ==
The following 24 clubs are competing in the Liga Nacional de Futsal during the 2023 season.

| Club | Location | Stadium | Capacity |
|---|---|---|---|
| (Rio Grande do Sul) Assoeva | Venâncio Aires | Ginásio Poliesportivo Parque do Chimarrão | 5,000 |
| (Rio Grande do Sul) Atlântico | Erechim | Clube Esportivo e Recreativo Atlântico | 3,500 |
| (Santa Catarina (state)) Blumenau Futsal | Blumenau | Complexo Esportivo Bernardo Werner | 5,000 |
| (Federal District (Brazil)) Brasília Futsal | Brasília | Ginásio Poliesportivo Vera Cruz | 1,200 |
| (Paraná (state)) Campo Mourão Futsal | Campo Mourão | Ginásio de Esportes Belin Carolo | 4,500 |
| (Rio Grande do Sul) Carlos Barbosa Futsal | Carlos Barbosa | Centro Municipal de Eventos Sérgio Luiz Guerra | 4,000 |
| (Paraná (state)) Cascavel Futsal | Cascavel | Ginásio Odilon Reinhardt | 1,800 |
| (São Paulo (state)) Corinthians | São Paulo | Ginásio Poliesportivo Wlamir Marques | 7,000 |
| (Paraná (state)) Esporte Futuro | Toledo | Ginásio de Esportes Alcides Pan | 3,780 |
| (Paraná (state)) Foz Cataratas Poker | Foz do Iguaçu | Ginásio Ministro Costa Cavalcanti | 3,500 |
| (Santa Catarina (state)) Jaraguá Futsal | Jaraguá do Sul | Arena Jaraguá | 8,000 |
| (Santa Catarina (state)) Joaçaba Futsal | Joaçaba | Centro de Eventos da UNOESC | 5,500 |
| (Santa Catarina (state)) JEC Krona Futsal | Joinville | Centreventos Cau Hansen | 2,500 |
| (São Paulo (state)) Magnus Futsal | Sorocaba | Arena Sorocaba | 5,000 |
| (Paraná (state)) Marreco Futsal | Francisco Beltrão | Complexo Esportivo Arrudão | 3,500 |
| (Minas Gerais) Minas Tênis Clube | Belo Horizonte | Arena UniBH | 3,600 |
| (Paraná (state)) Pato Futsal | Pato Branco | Ginásio Municipal Dolivar Lavarda | 1,500 |
| (Minas Gerais) Praia Clube | Uberlândia | Arena Praia | 2,200 |
| (São Paulo (state)) Santo André Intelli | Santo André | Ginásio de Esportes Noêmia Assunção | 1,000 |
| (São Paulo (state)) São José Futsal | São José dos Campos | Ginásio Tênis Clube | 2,500 |
| (Santa Catarina (state)) São Lourenço Futsal | São Lourenço do Oeste | Ginásio Poliesportivo do CEIM Monteiro Lobato | 1,900 |
| (São Paulo (state)) Taubaté Futsal | Taubaté | Ginásio Adib Moisés Dib | 5,730 |
| (Santa Catarina (state)) Tubarão Futsal | Tubarão | Ginásio Estener Soratto | 3,600 |
| (Paraná (state)) Umuarama Futsal | Umuarama | Ginásio Amário Vieira da Costa | 4,500 |

== Winners ==
| Season | Champion | Score | Runner-up | Losing semi-finalists |
|---|---|---|---|---|
| 1996 | (Rio Grande do Sul) Internacional/Ulbra | 12–3 (2–2, 4–0, 6–1) | (Rio Grande do Sul) Vasco da Gama/DalPonte/Unimed | Goiás/Futsal 2000 and (São Paulo (state)) GM/Chevrolet |
| 1997 | (Minas Gerais) Atlético Mineiro/Pax de Minas | 7–4 (3–3, 4–1) | (São Paulo (state)) Banespa/Phercani | (Rio Grande do Sul) Carlos Barbosa and (São Paulo (state)) GM/Chevrolet |
| 1998 | (Rio Grande do Sul) Ulbra | 11–3 (5–1, 6–2) | (Rio Grande do Sul) Carlos Barbosa | (São Paulo (state)) GM/Chevrolet and (Rio de Janeiro (state)) Iate/Kaiser |
| 1999 | (Minas Gerais) Atlético Mineiro/Pax de Minas | 10–7 (5–3, 5–4) | (Rio de Janeiro (state)) Rio/Miécimo | (São Paulo (state)) GM/Chevrolet and (São Paulo (state)) São Paulo/Osasco |
| 2000 | (Rio de Janeiro (state)) Vasco da Gama | 7–3 (3–1, 4–2) | (Minas Gerais) Atlético Mineiro | (Rio Grande do Sul) Ulbra and (São Paulo (state)) GM/Chevrolet |
| 2001 | (Rio Grande do Sul) Carlos Barbosa | 14–10 (3–7, 5–2, 6–1) | (Rio Grande do Sul) Ulbra | (Rio de Janeiro (state)) Flamengo and (Paraná (state)) Foz Futsal |
| 2002 | (Rio Grande do Sul) Ulbra | 11–6 (7–4, 4–2) | (Minas Gerais) W@ytv/Minas | (Santa Catarina (state)) Malwee/Jaraguá and UCG/Goiás |
| 2003 | (Rio Grande do Sul) Ulbra | 7–3 (2–0, 5–3) | (Rio Grande do Sul) Carlos Barbosa | (Santa Catarina (state)) Malwee/Jaraguá and (São Paulo (state)) ECB/São Bernardo |
| 2004 | (Rio Grande do Sul) Carlos Barbosa | 9–5 (1–2, 5–2, 3–1) | (Rio Grande do Sul) Ulbra | (Santa Catarina (state)) Malwee/Jaraguá and (Rio Grande do Sul) Atlântico |
| 2005 | (Santa Catarina (state)) Malwee/Jaraguá | 5–4 (2–2, 3–2) | (Rio Grande do Sul) Atlântico | (Rio Grande do Sul) John Deere Futsal and (Rio Grande do Sul) Ulbra |
| 2006 | (Rio Grande do Sul) Carlos Barbosa | 11–6 (3–4, 3–0, 5–2) | (Santa Catarina (state)) Malwee/Jaraguá | (Santa Catarina (state)) Joinville/Krona and (Rio Grande do Sul) Atlântico |
| 2007 | (Santa Catarina (state)) Malwee/Jaraguá | 11–4 (6–1, 5–3) | (Santa Catarina (state)) Joinville/Krona | (Rio Grande do Sul) Ulbra and (São Paulo (state)) Intelli/Orlândia |
| 2008 | (Santa Catarina (state)) Malwee/Jaraguá | 8–4 (2–2, 6–2) | (Rio Grande do Sul) Ulbra | (Rio Grande do Sul) Cortiana/UCS/AFF and (Rio Grande do Sul) Carlos Barbosa |
| 2009 | (Rio Grande do Sul) Carlos Barbosa | 9–6 (4–2, 5–4) | (Santa Catarina (state)) Malwee/Jaraguá | (Santa Catarina (state)) Floripa Futsal and (Paraná (state)) Umuarama |
| 2010 | (Santa Catarina (state)) Malwee/Jaraguá | 4–2 (2–2, 2–0) | (Paraná (state)) Copagril | (São Paulo (state)) Corinthians/São Caetano and (Rio Grande do Sul) Carlos Barbosa |
| 2011 | (São Paulo (state)) Santos/Cortiana | 6–6 (3–4, 3–2) (7–6 p) | (Rio Grande do Sul) Carlos Barbosa | (São Paulo (state)) Corinthians/São Caetano and (Santa Catarina (state)) Floripa Futsal |
| 2012 | (São Paulo (state)) Intelli/Orlândia | 5–4 (1–0, 4–4) | (Santa Catarina (state)) Joinville/Krona | (Rio Grande do Sul) Carlos Barbosa and (São Paulo (state)) Corinthians |
| 2013 | (São Paulo (state)) Intelli/Orlândia | 4–3 (2–1, 2–2) | (Santa Catarina (state)) Concórdia | (Santa Catarina (state)) Joinville/Krona and (São Paulo (state)) Corinthians |
| 2014 | (São Paulo (state)) Futsal Brasil Kirin | 6–7 (4–2, 2–5) 4–3 (aet) | (São Paulo (state)) Intelli/Orlândia | (Santa Catarina (state)) Jaraguá and (São Paulo (state)) Corinthians |
| 2015 | (Rio Grande do Sul) Carlos Barbosa | 10–4 (5–3, 5–1) | (São Paulo (state)) Intelli/Orlândia | (São Paulo (state)) Corinthians and (São Paulo (state)) Futsal Brasil Kirin |
| 2016 | (São Paulo (state)) Corinthians | 8–4 (3–2, 5–2) | (São Paulo (state)) Magnus Futsal | (Paraná (state)) Copagril and (Rio Grande do Sul) Assoeva |
| 2017 | (Santa Catarina (state)) Joinville/Krona | 3–3 (1–1, 2–2) 1–0 (aet) | (Rio Grande do Sul) Assoeva | (Paraná (state)) Foz Cataratas and (Paraná (state)) Marreco |
| 2018 | (Paraná (state)) Pato Futsal | 8–4 (6–0, 2–4) 2–1 (aet) | (Rio Grande do Sul) Atlântico | (São Paulo (state)) Magnus Futsal and (Paraná (state)) Copagril |
| 2019 | (Paraná (state)) Pato Futsal | 9–2 (3–2, 6–0) | (São Paulo (state)) Magnus Futsal | (Santa Catarina (state)) Joinville/Krona and (Santa Catarina (state)) Jaraguá |
| 2020 | (São Paulo (state)) Magnus Futsal | 4–1 (1–1, 3–0) | (São Paulo (state)) Corinthians | (Santa Catarina (state)) Joinville/Krona and (Santa Catarina (state)) Tubarão |
| 2021 | (Paraná (state)) Cascavel | 9–1 (3–1, 6–0) | (São Paulo (state)) Magnus Futsal | (Rio Grande do Sul) Carlos Barbosa and (Paraná (state)) Foz Cataratas |
| 2022 | (São Paulo (state)) Corinthians | 11–3 (6–2, 5–1) | (Rio Grande do Sul) Atlântico | (Paraná (state)) Cascavel and (Santa Catarina (state)) Jaraguá |
| 2023 | (Rio Grande do Sul) Atlântico | 2–1 | (Santa Catarina (state)) Joinville/Krona | (São Paulo (state)) Magnus Futsal and (Paraná (state)) Cascavel |
| 2024 | (Santa Catarina (state)) Jaraguá | 3–3 (6-5 pen.) | (Minas Gerais) Praia Clube | (Paraná (state)) Pato Futsal and (Paraná (state)) Umuarama |
| 2025 | (Santa Catarina (state)) Jaraguá | 6–3 (3–3, 3–0) | (São Paulo (state)) Corinthians | (Rio Grande do Sul) Atlântico and (Paraná (state)) Campo Mourão |

== Records and statistics ==
=== By team ===
| Team | Winner | Runner-up | Years won | Years runner-up |
|---|---|---|---|---|
| (Santa Catarina (state)) Jaraguá | 6 | 2 | 2005, 2007, 2008, 2010, 2024, 2025 | 2006, 2009 |
| (Rio Grande do Sul) Carlos Barbosa | 5 | 3 | 2001, 2004, 2006, 2009, 2015 | 1998, 2003, 2011 |
| (Rio Grande do Sul) Ulbra | 3 | 3 | 1998, 2002, 2003 | 2001, 2004, 2008 |
| (São Paulo (state)) Magnus Futsal (Note: Magnus Futsal was known as Futsal Brasil Kirin from 2014 until 2016.) | 2 | 3 | 2014, 2020 | 2016, 2019, 2021 |
| (São Paulo (state)) Intelli | 2 | 2 | 2012, 2013 | 2014, 2015 |
| (Minas Gerais) Atlético Mineiro | 2 | 1 | 1997, 1999 | 2000 |
| (São Paulo (state)) Corinthians | 2 | 2 | 2016, 2022 | 2020, 2025 |
| (Paraná (state)) Pato Futsal | 2 | 0 | 2018, 2019 | — |
| (Santa Catarina (state)) Joinville/Krona | 1 | 3 | 2017 | 2007, 2012, 2023 |
| (Rio Grande do Sul) Atlântico | 1 | 3 | 2023 | 2005, 2018, 2022 |
| (Rio Grande do Sul) Internacional | 1 | 0 | 1996 | — |
| (Rio de Janeiro (state)) Vasco da Gama | 1 | 0 | 2000 | — |
| (São Paulo (state)) Santos/Cortiana | 1 | 0 | 2011 | — |
| (Paraná (state)) Cascavel | 1 | 0 | 2021 | — |
| (Rio Grande do Sul) Vasco da Gama | 0 | 1 | — | 1996 |
| (São Paulo (state)) Banespa | 0 | 1 | — | 1997 |
| (Rio de Janeiro (state)) Rio/Miécimo | 0 | 1 | — | 1999 |
| (Minas Gerais) Minas Tênis Clube | 0 | 1 | — | 2002 |
| (Paraná (state)) Copagril | 0 | 1 | — | 2010 |
| (Santa Catarina (state)) Concórdia | 0 | 1 | — | 2013 |
| (Rio Grande do Sul) Assoeva | 0 | 1 | — | 2017 |
| (Minas Gerais) Praia Clube | 0 | 1 | — | 2024 |

=== By state ===
| Country | Winner | Runner-up |
|---|---|---|
| Rio Grande do Sul | 10 | 11 |
| São Paulo | 7 | 8 |
| Santa Catarina | 7 | 6 |
| Minas Gerais | 2 | 3 |
| Paraná | 3 | 1 |
| Rio de Janeiro | 1 | 1 |

=== Top scorers ===
| Season | Top scorer |
|---|---|
| 1996 | (Brazil) Luís Ortiz ( (Rio Grande do Sul) Internacional/Ulbra, 25 goals) |
| 1997 | (Brazil) Lenísio ( (São Paulo (state)) GM/Chevrolet, 36 goals) (Brazil) Vander Carioca ( (Minas Gerais) Atlético Mineiro/Pax de Minas, 36 goals) |
| 1998 | (Brazil) Índio ( (Rio Grande do Sul) Ulbra, 21 goals) |
| 1999 | (Brazil) Lenísio ( (Minas Gerais) Atlético Mineiro/Pax de Minas, 25 goals) |
| 2000 | (Brazil) Manoel Tobias ( (Minas Gerais) Atlético Mineiro, 52 goals) |
| 2001 | (Brazil) Lenísio ( (Rio Grande do Sul) Ulbra, 25 goals) |
| 2002 | (Brazil) Lenísio ( (Rio Grande do Sul) Ulbra, 31 goals) |
| 2003 | (Brazil) Pablo Ribeiro ( (Rio Grande do Sul) Carlos Barbosa, 25 goals) (Brazil) Serjão ( (Rio Grande do Sul) Ulbra, 25 goals) |
| 2004 | (Brazil) Pablo Ribeiro ( (Rio Grande do Sul) Carlos Barbosa, 27 goals) |
| 2005 | (Brazil) Falcão ( (Santa Catarina (state)) Jaraguá, 25 goals) |
| 2006 | (Brazil) Marinho ( (São Paulo (state)) Intelli/Orlândia, 25 goals) |
| 2007 | (Brazil) William Negão ( (Santa Catarina (state)) Malwee/Jaraguá, 31 goals) |
| 2008 | (Brazil) Falcão ( (Santa Catarina (state)) Malwee/Jaraguá, 32 goals) |
| 2009 | (Brazil) Falcão ( (Santa Catarina (state)) Malwee/Jaraguá, 32 goals) (Brazil) Lenísio ( (Santa Catarina (state)) Malwee/Jaraguá, 32 goals) |
| 2010 | (Brazil) Falcão ( (Santa Catarina (state)) Malwee/Jaraguá, 39 goals) |
| 2011 | (Brazil) Falcão ( (São Paulo (state)) Santos/Cortiana, 32 goals) |
| 2012 | (Brazil) Rodrigo ( (Rio Grande do Sul) Carlos Barbosa, 24 goals) |
| 2013 | (Brazil) Vander Carioca ( (Santa Catarina (state)) Joinville/Krona, 22 goals) |
| 2014 | (Brazil) Falcão ( (São Paulo (state)) Futsal Brasil Kirin, 19 goals) |
| 2015 | (Brazil) Dieguinho ( (São Paulo (state)) Intelli/Orlândia, 30 goals) |
| 2016 | (Brazil) Deives Moraes ( (São Paulo (state)) Corinthians, 20 goals) (Brazil) Rodrigo ( (São Paulo (state)) Magnus Futsal, 20 goals) |
| 2017 | (Brazil) Sinoê ( (Paraná (state)) Marreco, 15 goals) (Brazil) Well Pereira ( (Minas Gerais) Intelli, 15 goals) |
| 2018 | (Brazil) Keké ( (Rio Grande do Sul) Atlântico, 23 goals) |
| 2019 | (Brazil) Rodrigo ( (São Paulo (state)) Magnus Futsal, 18 goals) |
| 2020 | (Brazil) Rodrigo ( (São Paulo (state)) Magnus Futsal, 15 goals) |
| 2021 | (Brazil) Roni ( (Paraná (state)) Cascavel, 19 goals) |
| 2022 | (Brazil) Dieguinho ( (Santa Catarina (state)) Joinville/Krona, 25 goals) |
| 2023 | (Brazil) Richard ( (Rio Grande do Sul) Atlântico, 30 goals) |
| 2024 | (Brazil) Gilvan ( (Paraná (state)) Praia Clube, 30 goals) |
| 2025 | (Brazil) Vagner ( (Rio Grande do Sul) Atlântico, 20 goals) |
