= Léo Jaraguá =

Brazilian-born Kazakhstani futsal player

Leo Jaraguá
Personal information
- Full name: Leonardo Mendonça da Rosa
- Date of birth: 21 May 1987 (age 39)
- Place of birth: Jaraguá do Sul, Brazil
- Height: 1.83 m (6 ft 0 in)
- Positions: Defender; winger

Team information
- Current team: Sporting CP
- Number: 2

Senior career*
Years	Team	Apps	(Gls)
2006	Jaraguá		
2007	Tubarão		
2008	Foz Futsal		
2009–2018	Kairat Almaty		
2016–2017	→ Sporting CP (loan)	28	(11)
2018–	Sporting CP	13	(9)

International career
2015–	Kazakhstan		
- * Club domestic league appearances and goals as of 8 August 2018 (UTC)

Leonardo Mendonça da Rosa (born 21 May 1987), commonly known as Leo Jaraguá or just Leo, is a Brazilian born Kazakhstani futsal player who plays for Sporting CP and the Kazakhstani national futsal team as a defender and winger.

== Career ==
Leo started his career in his hometown team and Brazilian powerhouse, Jaraguá, followed by short stints at Tubarão, and Foz Futsal. In 2009 he was invited by a friend to play for Kairat Almaty in Kazakhstan where he played for eight seasons, winning two UEFA Futsal Cups at the club. After having previously spent one season on loan from Kairat Almaty at Sporting CP Leo made a permanent move to the team in the summer of 2018.

== Personal life ==
He is the older brother of Daniel Rosa, a futsal player who played alongside Leo at Kairat Almaty in the 2017/18 season. He is also the cousin of Willian Dorn who is playing as a goalkeeper for Brazil national futsal team.
