= Taynan da Silva =

Brazilian-born Kazakhstani futsal player

Personal information
- Full name: Taynan da Silva Rego
- Date of birth: 12 February 1993 (age 33)
- Place of birth: Campina Grande, Brazil
- Height: 1.79 m (5 ft 10 in)
- Positions: Winger; pivot

Team information
- Current team: Sporting CP
- Number: 33

Youth career
- 2003–2004: Blumenau
- 2005–2010: APAMA
- 2011: Campo Mourão
- 2011: Siderópolis
- 2012: Palmeiras
- 2013: Corinthians

Senior career*
Years	Team	Apps	(Gls)
2013	Jaraguá		
2014	Rio do Sul		
2015	Keima Futsal		
2016–2017	Mes Sungun		(23)
2017–2019	Kairat Almaty		
2019–2021	Sporting CP	63	(37)
2021–2023	ElPozo Murcia	10	(4)
2023–	Sporting CP		

International career
- Kazakhstan
- * Club domestic league appearances and goals as of 22 January 2022

Taynan da Silva Rego (born 12 February 1993) is a Brazilian-born Kazakh professional futsal player who plays as a winger and pivot for Sporting CP and the Kazakhstan national futsal team.

== Honours ==
- UEFA Futsal Champions League runner-up: 2018–19
