= Franklin (futsal player) =

Brazilian futsal player

Personal information
- Full name: Franklin Roosevelt Bueres Júnior
- Date of birth: 18 May 1971 (age 55)
- Place of birth: Osasco, Brazil
- Height: 1.81 m (5 ft 11 1/2 in)
- Position: Goalkeeper

Team information
- Current team: Corinthians

Senior career*
Years	Team	Apps	(Gls)
1989–1994	Eternit		
1994–1995	General Motors		
1995–1997	Corinthians		
1997–1999	Banespa		
1999–2001	General Motors		
2001	Soums		
2001–2004	Malwee/Jaraguá		
2004–2005	Luparense		
2005–2006	Cartagena		
2006–2008	Guadalajara		
2008–2010	Malwee/Jaraguá		
2011	Joinville		
2012	Corinthians		

International career
- Brazil
Medal record
Representing Brazil
Men's Futsal
FIFA Futsal World Cup
Winner	1992 Hong Kong
Winner	1996 Spain
Runner-up	2000 Guatemala
Third place	2004 Chinese Taipei
- * Club domestic league appearances and goals

Franklin Roosevelt Bueres Junior (born 18 May 1971), commonly known as Franklin, is a Brazilian futsal player who plays for Corinthians and the Brazilian national futsal team.
