= 2016 Futsal Intercontinental Cup =

2016 Intercontinental Futsal Cup
Tournament details
- Host country: Qatar
- Dates: 24–29 June
- Teams: 8 (from 6 associations)
- Venue: 2 (in 1 host city)

Final positions
- Champions: (Brazil) Magnus Futsal (1st title)
- Runners-up: (Brazil) Carlos Barbosa
- Third place: (Spain) FC Barcelona
- Fourth place: (Qatar) Al-Rayyan SC

Tournament statistics
- Matches played: 12
- Goals scored: 56 (4.67 per match)
- Top scorer: (Brazil) Wilde (5 goals)
- Best player: (Brazil) Marlon
- Best goalkeeper: (Brazil) Tiago

The 2016 Futsal Intercontinental Cup is the 17th edition of the world's premier club futsal tournament, and the 11th edition under FIFA recognition. It is organized by the Qatar Football Association in association with the Liga Nacional de Fútbol Sala.

Atlântico are the defending champions, but were not invited for this edition.

== Format ==
In the group stage, teams were drawn into groups of four teams. In each group, teams play against each other in a round-robin mini-tournament.

In the knockout stage, the four qualified teams (two from each group) play the semi-finals. The winners of the semi-finals qualify for the final match, to be played on 29 June 2016. The remaining teams play in a series of placement matches to determine the final standings.

== Teams ==
The following 8 teams were invited for the tournament.

Team	Tournament appearance	Last appearance	Previous best performance
(Qatar) Al-Rayyan SC	1st	—	Debut
(Spain) FC Barcelona	2nd	1997	Second place (1997)
(Portugal) SL Benfica	4th	2011	Third place (2011)
(Brazil) Carlos Barbosa	9th	2013	Champions (2004, 2012)
(Russia) MFK Dinamo Moskva	3rd	2014	Champions (2013)
(Spain) Inter FS	8th	2012	Champions (2005, 2006, 2007, 2008, 2011)
(Brazil) Magnus Futsal	1st	—	Debut
(Iran) Tasisat Daryaei FSC	1st	—	Debut

== Venues ==
The games of the tournament were played in two venues in the city of Doha.

Doha		Location of the host cities of the 2016 Futsal Intercontinental Cup.
Ali Bin Hamad Al Attiya Arena	Aspire Ladies Sports Hall	Location of the host cities of the 2016 Futsal Intercontinental Cup.
Capacity: 7,700	Capacity: 2,500	Location of the host cities of the 2016 Futsal Intercontinental Cup.

== Group stage ==
=== Group A ===
Pos	Team	Pld	W	D	L	GF	GA	GD	Pts	Qualification
1	(Spain) FC Barcelona	3	2	1	0	10	7	+3	7	Knockout stage
2	(Brazil) Carlos Barbosa	3	1	1	1	9	9	0	4	Knockout stage
3	(Russia) MFK Dinamo Moskva	3	1	1	1	7	7	0	4	
4	(Iran) Tasisat Daryaei FSC	3	0	1	2	7	10	−3	1	

Source: LNFS
24 June 2016
21:00

MFK Dinamo Moskva (Russia)	3–2	(Brazil) Carlos Barbosa
Cirilo 17'; Romulo 29'; Fukin 32'	Report	Rafa 1'; Zico 39'

Aspire Ladies Sports Hall, Doha
Referee: Gutiérrez Lumbreras, Peña Diaz (Spain)

24 June 2016
22:45

Tasisat Daryaei FSC (Iran)	2–4	(Spain) FC Barcelona
S. Ahmadabbasi 20'; V. Shamsaei 26'	Report	Wilde 1', 15', 35'; Lin 25'

Aspire Ladies Sports Hall, Doha
Referee: Saša Tomić (Croatia), Kamil Çetin (Turkey)

25 June 2016
21:00

FC Barcelona (Spain)	3–2	(Russia) MFK Dinamo Moskva
S. Lozano 22'; Dyego 25'; Saad 27'	Report	Pula 11'; Nando 38'

Aspire Ladies Sports Hall, Doha
Referee: Pascal Lemal (Belgium), Eduardo Fernandes (Portugal)

25 June 2016
22:45

Carlos Barbosa (Brazil)	4–3	(Iran) Tasisat Daryaei FSC
Bruno 5', 22'; Rafa 14'; Murilo 38'	Report	A. Vafaei 18'; M. Hajibandeh 24'; M. Sangsefidi 39'

Aspire Ladies Sports Hall, Doha
Referee: Alessandro Malfer (Italy), Khamis Alshamsi (United Arab Emirates)

26 June 2016
21:00

Carlos Barbosa (Brazil)	3–3	(Spain) FC Barcelona
Rafa 23', 24'; Zico 35'	Report	Wilde 4', 14'; S. Lozano 14'

Ali Bin Hamad Al Attiya Arena, Doha
Referee: Marc Birkett (England), Gábor Kovács (Spain)

26 June 2016
21:00

Tasisat Daryaei FSC (Iran)	2–2	(Russia) MFK Dinamo Moskva
M. Shajari 4'; H. Tayyebi 14'	Report	Cirilo 37', 38'

Aspire Ladies Sports Hall, Doha
Referee: Sherif Rashwan (Egypt), Salem Eid Ali (Qatar)

=== Group B ===
Pos	Team	Pld	W	D	L	GF	GA	GD	Pts	Qualification
1	(Qatar) Al-Rayyan SC	3	2	0	1	8	6	+2	6	Knockout stage
2	(Brazil) Magnus Futsal	3	2	0	1	7	6	+1	6	Knockout stage
3	(Spain) Inter FS	3	1	1	1	3	3	0	4	
4	(Portugal) SL Benfica	3	0	1	2	5	8	−3	1	

Source: LNFS
24 June 2016
21:00

Al-Rayyan SC (Qatar)	1–2	(Spain) Inter FS
T. Grippi 39'	Report	Borja 19'; Darlan 32'

Ali Bin Hamad Al Attiya Arena, Doha
Referee: Marc Birkett (England), Sherif Rashwan (Egypt)

24 June 2016
22:45

SL Benfica (Portugal)	2–4	(Brazil) Magnus Futsal
B. Coelho 36'; Alan Brandi 40'	Report	Rodrigo 6'; Falcão 18', 39'; Keko 21'

Ali Bin Hamad Al Attiya Arena, Doha
Referee: Gábor Kovács (Spain), Alessandro Malfer (Italy)

25 June 2016
21:00

Magnus Futsal (Brazil)	2–4	(Qatar) Al-Rayyan SC
Simi 29'; Rodrigo 35'	Report	Arthur 10', 33'; T. Grippi 25'; Amro. M 37'

Ali Bin Hamad Al Attiya Arena, Doha
Referee: Peña Diaz, Gutiérrez Lumbreras (Spain)

25 June 2016
22:45

Inter FS (Spain)	1–1	(Portugal) SL Benfica
Borja 8'	Report	Alan Brandi 2'

Ali Bin Hamad Al Attiya Arena, Doha
Referee: Salem Eid Ali (Qatar), Saša Tomić (Croatia)

26 June 2016
22:45

Al-Rayyan SC (Qatar)	3–2	(Portugal) SL Benfica
Serginho 33'; Nunes 34'; T. Grippi 39'	Report	Chaguinha 23'; F. Cecílio 36'

Aspire Ladies Sports Hall, Doha
Referee: Khamis Alshamsi (United Arab Emirates), Pascal Lemal (Belgium)

26 June 2016
22:45

Magnus Futsal (Brazil)	1–0	(Spain) Inter FS
Keko 22'	Report

Ali Bin Hamad Al Attiya Arena, Doha
Referee: Eduardo Fernandes (Portugal), Kamil Çetin (Turkey)

== Knockout stage ==
=== Bracket ===
Semi-finals
28 June – Doha (ABHAAA)
(Spain) FC Barcelona	3 (1)
(Brazil) Magnus Futsal (pen.)	3 (3)
28 June – Doha (ABHAAA)
(Qatar) Al-Rayyan SC	0
(Brazil) Carlos Barbosa	3

Final
29 June – Doha (ABHAAA)
(Brazil) Magnus Futsal (aet)	4
(Brazil) Carlos Barbosa	3
Third place
29 June – Doha (ABHAAA)
(Spain) FC Barcelona	6
(Qatar) Al-Rayyan SC	1

=== Semi-finals ===
28 June 2016
21:00

FC Barcelona (Spain)	3–3 (a.e.t.)	(Brazil) Magnus Futsal
S. Lozano 18', 38'; M. Tolrà 29'	Report	Falcão 10'; Simi 22', 40'
Penalties
S. Lozano (penalty scored); Ferrão (penalty missed)	1 – 3	(penalty scored) Rodrigo; (penalty scored) Simi; (penalty scored) Falcão

Ali Bin Hamad Al Attiya Arena, Doha

28 June 2016
23:00

Al-Rayyan SC (Qatar)	0–3	(Brazil) Carlos Barbosa
	Report	Canabarro 6'; Zico 13'; Felipe 17'

Ali Bin Hamad Al Attiya Arena, Doha

=== Third-place match ===
29 June 2016
21:00

FC Barcelona (Spain)	6–1	(Qatar) Al-Rayyan SC
Aicardo 5', 38'; Lin 14', 27'; Esteban 20'; Wilde 35'	Report	Cristian 31' (o.g.)

Ali Bin Hamad Al Attiya Arena, Doha
Referee: Pascal Lemal (Belgium), Alessandro Malfer (Italy)

=== Final ===
29 June 2016
23:00

Magnus Futsal (Brazil)	4–3 (a.e.t.)	(Brazil) Carlos Barbosa
Diego 18'; Mithyue 41'; Simi 45'; Neguinho 46'	Report	Canabarro 32'; Grillo 43'; Murilo 46'

Ali Bin Hamad Al Attiya Arena, Doha
Referee: Gutiérrez Lumbreras, Peña Diaz (Spain)
