= Gian Wolverine =

Brazilian futsal player

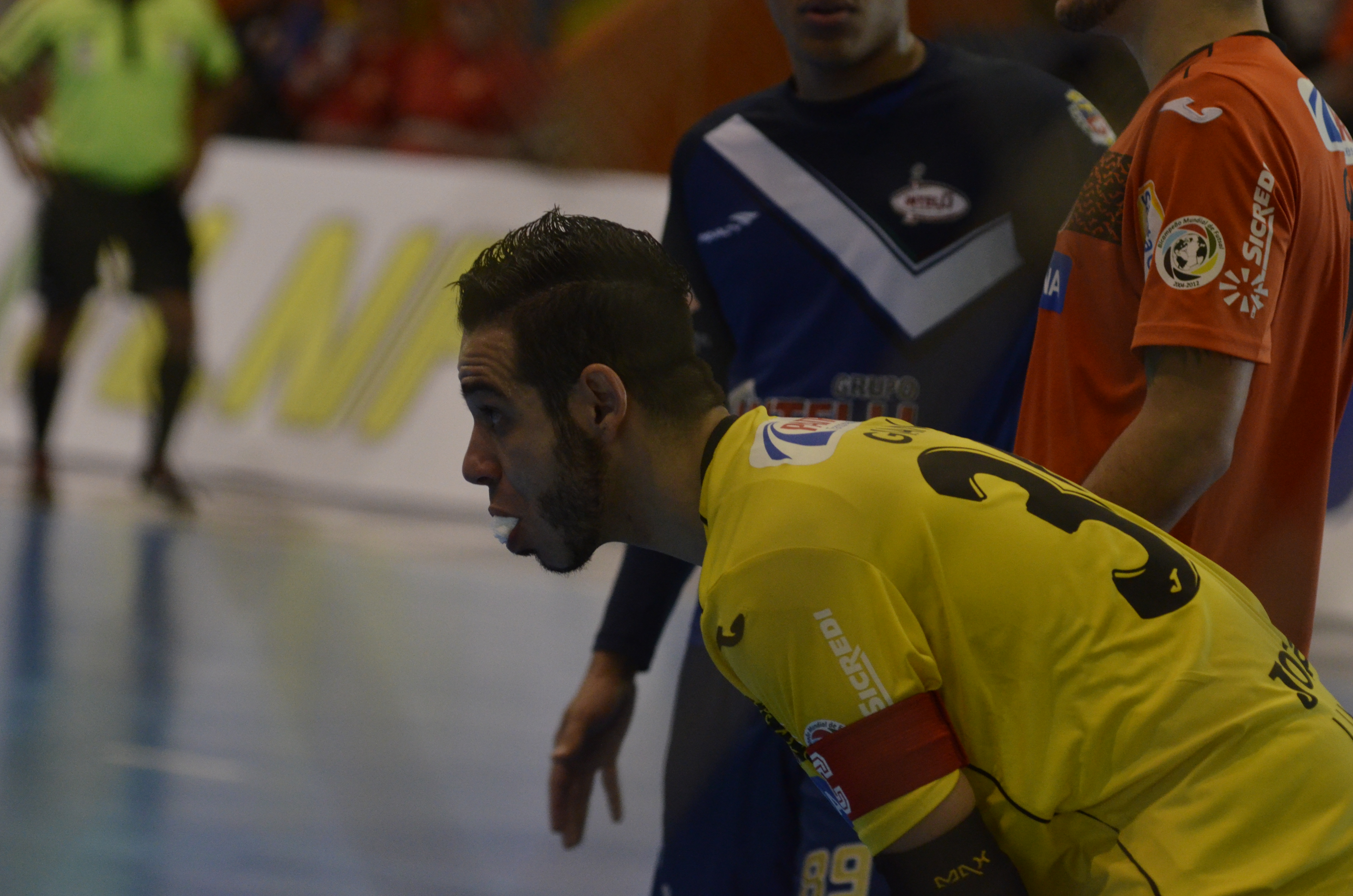

Personal information
- Full name: Giancarlo Ramos Rodolpho
- Date of birth: 14 February 1985 (age 41)
- Place of birth: Cambé, Brazil
- Height: 1.73 m (5 ft 8 in)
- Position: Goalkeeper

Team information
- Current team: Carlos Barbosa
- Number: 30

Senior career*
Years	Team	Apps	(Gls)
2002–2003	Londrina		
2004	Amafusa		
2004	Rio Verde		
2005–2011	Umuarama		
2012	Jaraguá		
2013	Concórdia		
2014–2015	Carlos Barbosa		
2016	Intelli	21	(1)
2017	Foz Cataratas	22	(0)
2018–	Carlos Barbosa	19	(2)

International career
2013–	Brazil		
- * Club domestic league appearances and goals as of 00:00, 11 March 2019 (UTC)

Giancarlo Ramos Rodolpho (born 14 February 1985), known as Gian Wolverine, is a Brazilian futsal player who plays as a goalkeeper for Carlos Barbosa and the Brazilian national futsal team.
