= Falcão (futsal player) =

Brazilian futsal player (born 1977)

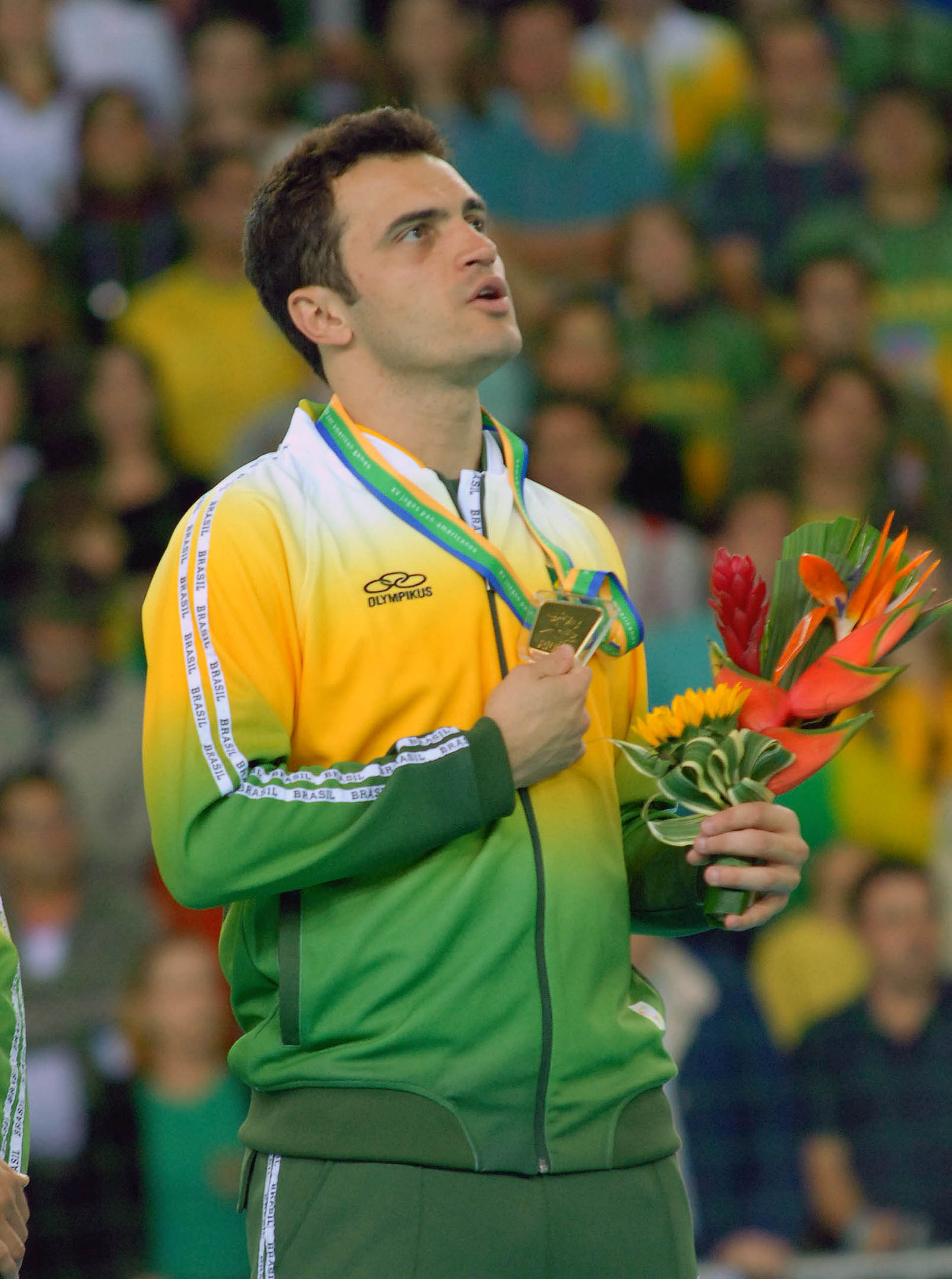
- Falcão in 2007

Personal information
- Full name: Alessandro Rosa Vieira
- Date of birth: 8 June 1977 (age 49)
- Place of birth: Santa Cruz do Rio Pardo, Brazil
- Height: 1.77 m (5 ft 10 in)
- Position: Winger

Senior career*
Years	Team	Apps	(Gls)
1989–1993	Guapira	47	(50)
1993–1996	Corinthians	132	(189)
1997–1998	GM-Chevrolet	38	(45)
1999	Atlético Mineiro	30	(38)
1999	Rio de Janeiro	29	(38)
2000	São Paulo	32	(39)
2000–2002	Banespa	51	(70)
2003–2005	Malwee/Jaraguá	62	(97)
2005	São Paulo (football)	2	(0)
2005–2010	Malwee/Jaraguá	168	(220)
2011	Cortiana/Santos	28	(36)
2012–2014	Intelli	48	(66)
2014	Madureira		
2015	Magnus Futsal		
2015	Vasco da Gama (futsal)		
2016	Chennai 5s	4	(5)
2020	Grêmio Futebol 7	1	(3)
Total		701	(1005)

International career^{‡}
1998–2018	Brazil	258	(401)
Medal record
Men's futsal
Representing Brazil
FIFA Futsal World Cup
Winner	2008 Brazil
Winner	2012 Thailand
Runner-up	2000 Guatemala
Third place	2004 Chinese Taipei
Copa América – FIFA Futsal
Winner	2000 Brazil
Winner	2008 Uruguay
Winner	2011 Argentina
Runner-up	2003 Paraguay
Pan American Games
Gold medal – first place	2007 Rio de Janeiro
- * Club domestic league appearances and goals as of 15 March 2011 ‡ National team caps and goals as of 1 November 2018

Alessandro Rosa Vieira (born 8 June 1977), known as Falcão, is a Brazilian retired professional futsal player, often regarded as the greatest futsal player of all time and its biggest icon. He is known for his flashy and potent dribbling skills and a powerful and accurate left foot. He is also the world's all-time leading goalscorer in men's international matches. He was named as the Best Futsal Player in the World four times (2004, 2006, 2011 and 2012) and won the FIFA Futsal World Cup Golden Shoe in 2004 and the Golden Ball twice, in 2004 and 2008. Today he is a YouTuber teaching futsal tricks and showing different things about futsal culture. He is also the worldwide ambassador of futsal as a sports discipline, playing showmatches in Brazil and around the world.

== Career ==
Born to João Eli Vieira, a butcher and amateur football player in north of São Paulo, and Reinalma Rosa Vieira, Falcão received his nickname from his father (also known as Falcão) because of the similarity to Paulo Roberto Falcão, then a Brazil national football team player.

Falcão joined the Guapira futsal club in the northern zone of the city at the age of 12. He joined Corinthians in 1993 and became professional the same year. He debuted in the senior team in 1994. In 1997, he joined GM-Chevrolet, owned by the General Motors company. After leaving in 1999, he switched teams frequently until 2003, when he ended up in Jaraguá. After changing clubs again from 2011 to 2012, he joined Sorocaba in 2013, where he played until 2018.

In 2004, 2006, 2011 and 2012, he was recognised as the Best Futsal Player in the World. On 26 June 2015, Falcão joined Nottingham Forest's futsal team for a tournament in Kuwait. He also played in the inaugural season of the Asian Premier Futsal Championship for Indian side Chennai 5s, scoring five goals in the tournament.

He also had a brief spell playing 11-a-side football with São Paulo Futebol Clube during the first half of 2005, including in the 2005 Copa Libertadores, but returned to futsal soon after.

Internationally, Falcão scored 401 goals in 258 appearances for the Brazil national futsal team. At the 2004 and 2008 FIFA Futsal World Cups, the latter on home soil, he was recognised by FIFA as the Best Player of the tournaments. In 2008 and 2012, he helped Brazil win their 4th and 5th title in the FIFA Futsal World Cup. On 22 September 2016, Falcão retired from the national team after they were eliminated by Iran in the round of 16 at the 2016 World Cup. Despite the early exit, he managed to score 10 goals, winning the Bronze Shoe and ultimately becoming the all-time top goalscorer in FIFA Futsal World Cup history, having scored 48 times. Falcão is considered by many football experts and players the greatest player in futsal history.

Besides being one of the greatest players in the sport's history, Falcão also participated on two of the most viewed futsal matches in history.

== Honours ==
=== Club ===
Futsal

- South-American Championship: 2001, 2004
- Liga Futsal: 1999, 2005, 2007, 2008, 2010, 2011, 2012, 2013, 2014
- Brazilian Club Cup: 1998, 2003, 2004
- São Paulo City Cup: 1995, 1998, 2002
- Paulista Championship: 1995, 1997, 2000, 2001, 2014, 2017
- Mineiro Championship: 1999
- Catarinense Championship: 2003
- Metropolitan Championship: 1997, 1998, 1999, 2000, 2001
- Topper São Paulo Cup: 1997, 2001

Football

- Copa Libertadores: 2005
- Campeonato Paulista: 2005

=== National team ===
- Futsal Mundialito: 2001
- Nations Cup: 2001
- RJ International Cup: 1998
- American Cup: 1998, 1999, 2011
- South American Qualification: 2000, 2008
- Latin Cup: 2003
- Tigers 5 Tournament – Singapore: 1999
- Egypt Tournament: 2002
- Thailand Tournament: 2003
- Pan American Games: 2007
- Grand Prix de Futsal: 2005, 2006, 2007, 2008, 2009, 2011, 2013, 2014, 2015, 2018
- KL World 5s – Malaysia: 2008
- FIFA Futsal World Cup: 2008, 2012
- ODESUR Games: 2002, 2010

=== Individual ===
- Best Futsal Player of the World: 2004, 2006, 2011, 2012
- FIFA Futsal World Cup Golden Shoe: 2004
- FIFA Futsal World Cup Golden Ball: 2004, 2008
- FIFA Futsal World Cup Silver Shoe: 2008
- FIFA Futsal World Cup Bronze Shoe: 2016
- The FIFA Award for an Outstanding Career: 2016

== International goals ==
No.	Date	Venue	Opponent	Score	Result	Competition
1.	5 October 2000	Rio de Janeiro, Brazil	Canada	2–0	22–0	Friendly
2.	5 October 2000	Rio de Janeiro, Brazil	Canada	4–0	22–0	Friendly
3.	5 October 2000	Rio de Janeiro, Brazil	Canada	5–0	22–0	Friendly
4.	5 October 2000	Rio de Janeiro, Brazil	Canada	9–0	22–0	Friendly
5.	5 October 2000	Rio de Janeiro, Brazil	Canada	18–0	22–0	Friendly
6.	5 October 2000	Rio de Janeiro, Brazil	Canada	19–0	22–0	Friendly
7.	6 October 2000	Rio de Janeiro, Brazil	Iran	?–?	8–1	Friendly
8.	17 June 2004	Fortaleza, Brazil	Iran	6–0	8–2	Friendly
9.	20 June 2004	Fortaleza, Brazil	Iran	2–0	10–4	Friendly
10.	20 June 2004	Fortaleza, Brazil	Iran	8–3	10–4	Friendly
11.	20 June 2004	Fortaleza, Brazil	Iran	10–3	10–4	Friendly
12.	21 September 2005	Brusque, Brazil	Uruguay	1–0	5–1	2005 Grand Prix de Futsal
13.	23 September 2005	Brusque, Brazil	Argentina	1–0	2–0	2005 Grand Prix de Futsal
14.	24 September 2005	Brusque, Brazil	Colombia	4–2	7–3	2005 Grand Prix de Futsal
15.	October 2006	Caxias do Sul, Brazil				2006 Grand Prix de Futsal
16.		Caxias do Sul, Brazil				2006 Grand Prix de Futsal
17.		Caxias do Sul, Brazil				2006 Grand Prix de Futsal
18.		Caxias do Sul, Brazil				2006 Grand Prix de Futsal
19.		Caxias do Sul, Brazil				2006 Grand Prix de Futsal
20.	21 October 2006	Caxias do Sul, Brazil	Italy	4–2	5–3 (a.e.t.)	2006 Grand Prix de Futsal
21.	21 October 2006	Caxias do Sul, Brazil	Italy	5–2	5–3 (a.e.t.)	2006 Grand Prix de Futsal
22.	23 July 2007	Rio de Janeiro, Brazil	Guatemala	4–1	4–1	2007 Pan American Games
23.	24 July 2007	Rio de Janeiro, Brazil	Cuba	1–0	8–0	2007 Pan American Games
24.	24 July 2007	Rio de Janeiro, Brazil	Cuba	4–0	8–0	2007 Pan American Games
25.	24 July 2007	Rio de Janeiro, Brazil	Cuba	7–0	8–0	2007 Pan American Games
26.	27 July 2007	Rio de Janeiro, Brazil	Costa Rica	6–0	8–1	2007 Pan American Games
27.	28 July 2007	Rio de Janeiro, Brazil	Argentina	1–0	4–1	2007 Pan American Games
28.	28 July 2007	Rio de Janeiro, Brazil	Argentina	2–0	4–1	2007 Pan American Games
29.	22 October 2007	Joinville, Brazil	Belgium	1–0	7–0	2007 Grand Prix de Futsal
30.	22 October 2007	Joinville, Brazil	Belgium	2–0	7–0	2007 Grand Prix de Futsal
31.	24 October 2007	Jaraguá do Sul, Brazil	Egypt	3–1	7–3	2007 Grand Prix de Futsal
32.	24 October 2007	Jaraguá do Sul, Brazil	Egypt	4–1	7–3	2007 Grand Prix de Futsal
33.	24 October 2007	Jaraguá do Sul, Brazil	Egypt	6–1	7–3	2007 Grand Prix de Futsal
34.	27 October 2007	Jaraguá do Sul, Brazil	Iran	1–0	4–0	2007 Grand Prix de Futsal
35.	27 October 2007	Jaraguá do Sul, Brazil	Iran	3–0	4–0	2007 Grand Prix de Futsal
36.	30 September 2008	Brasília, Brazil	Japan	3–0	12–1	2008 FIFA Futsal World Cup
37.	30 September 2008	Brasília, Brazil	Japan	10–1	12–1	2008 FIFA Futsal World Cup
38.	2 October 2008	Brasília, Brazil	Solomon Islands	4–0	21–0	2008 FIFA Futsal World Cup
39.	2 October 2008	Brasília, Brazil	Solomon Islands	7–0	21–0	2008 FIFA Futsal World Cup
40.	2 October 2008	Brasília, Brazil	Solomon Islands	9–0	21–0	2008 FIFA Futsal World Cup
41.	2 October 2008	Brasília, Brazil	Solomon Islands	15–0	21–0	2008 FIFA Futsal World Cup
42.	2 October 2008	Brasília, Brazil	Solomon Islands	20–0	21–0	2008 FIFA Futsal World Cup
43.	2 October 2008	Brasília, Brazil	Solomon Islands	21–0	21–0	2008 FIFA Futsal World Cup
44.	4 October 2008	Brasília, Brazil	Russia	6–0	7–0	2008 FIFA Futsal World Cup
45.	8 October 2008	Brasília, Brazil	Cuba	3–0	9–0	2008 FIFA Futsal World Cup
46.	8 October 2008	Brasília, Brazil	Cuba	7–0	9–0	2008 FIFA Futsal World Cup
47.	14 October 2008	Rio de Janeiro, Brazil	Ukraine	1–1	5–3	2008 FIFA Futsal World Cup
48.	14 October 2008	Rio de Janeiro, Brazil	Ukraine	2–1	5–3	2008 FIFA Futsal World Cup
49.	14 October 2008	Rio de Janeiro, Brazil	Ukraine	4–2	5–3	2008 FIFA Futsal World Cup
50.	16 October 2008	Rio de Janeiro, Brazil	Russia	2–0	4–2	2008 FIFA Futsal World Cup
51.	17 October 2010	Anápolis, Brazil	Czech Republic	5–1	9–2	2010 Grand Prix de Futsal
52.	17 October 2010	Anápolis, Brazil	Czech Republic	8–2	9–2	2010 Grand Prix de Futsal
53.	12 September 2011	Buenos Aires, Argentina	Chile	7–1	14–2	2011 Copa América de Futsal
54.	12 September 2011	Buenos Aires, Argentina	Chile	9–1	14–2	2011 Copa América de Futsal
55.	12 September 2011	Buenos Aires, Argentina	Chile	10–1	14–2	2011 Copa América de Futsal
56.	13 September 2011	Buenos Aires, Argentina	Peru	3–0	8–1	2011 Copa América de Futsal
57.	16 September 2011	Buenos Aires, Argentina	Paraguay	3–1	6–2	2011 Copa América de Futsal
58.	16 September 2011	Buenos Aires, Argentina	Paraguay	5–1	6–2	2011 Copa América de Futsal
59.	17 September 2011	Buenos Aires, Argentina	Argentina	3–1	5–1	2011 Copa América de Futsal
60.	15 April 2012	Gramado, Brazil	Bolivia	4–0	15–1	2012 FIFA Futsal World Cup qualification
61.	15 April 2012	Gramado, Brazil	Bolivia	7–0	15–1	2012 FIFA Futsal World Cup qualification
62.	15 April 2012	Gramado, Brazil	Bolivia	8–0	15–1	2012 FIFA Futsal World Cup qualification
63.	16 April 2012	Gramado, Brazil	Peru	1–0	9–0	2012 FIFA Futsal World Cup qualification
64.	16 April 2012	Gramado, Brazil	Peru	5–0	9–0	2012 FIFA Futsal World Cup qualification
65.	16 April 2012	Gramado, Brazil	Peru	6–0	9–0	2012 FIFA Futsal World Cup qualification
66.	17 April 2012	Gramado, Brazil	Argentina	1–0	3–0	2012 FIFA Futsal World Cup qualification
67.	22 April 2012	Gramado, Brazil	Colombia	3–0	5–1	2012 FIFA Futsal World Cup qualification
68.	12 November 2012	Nakhon Ratchasima, Thailand	Panama	14–0	16–0	2012 FIFA Futsal World Cup
69.	14 November 2012	Bangkok, Thailand	Argentina	2–2	3–2 (a.e.t.)	2012 FIFA Futsal World Cup
70.	14 November 2012	Bangkok, Thailand	Argentina	3–2	3–2 (a.e.t.)	2012 FIFA Futsal World Cup
71.	18 November 2012	Bangkok, Thailand	Spain	3–2	3–2 (a.e.t.)	2012 FIFA Futsal World Cup
72.	12 November 2014	São Bernardo do Campo, Brazil	Vietnam	8–1	8–1	2014 Grand Prix de Futsal
73.	13 November 2014	São Bernardo do Campo, Brazil	Colombia	3–0	4–0	2014 Grand Prix de Futsal
74.	15 November 2014	São Bernardo do Campo, Brazil	Guatemala	5–1	8–2	2014 Grand Prix de Futsal
75.	15 November 2014	São Bernardo do Campo, Brazil	Guatemala	6–2	8–2	2014 Grand Prix de Futsal
76.	15 November 2014	São Bernardo do Campo, Brazil	Guatemala	7–2	8–2	2014 Grand Prix de Futsal
77.	16 November 2014	São Bernardo do Campo, Brazil	Colombia	7–2	7–2	2014 Grand Prix de Futsal
78.	11 September 2016	Bucaramanga, Colombia	Ukraine	2–0	3–1	2016 FIFA Futsal World Cup
79.	14 September 2016	Bucaramanga, Colombia	Australia	3–1	11–1	2016 FIFA Futsal World Cup
80.	14 September 2016	Bucaramanga, Colombia	Australia	4–1	11–1	2016 FIFA Futsal World Cup
81.	14 September 2016	Bucaramanga, Colombia	Australia	11–1	11–1	2016 FIFA Futsal World Cup
82.	17 September 2016	Cali, Colombia	Mozambique	13–2	15–3	2016 FIFA Futsal World Cup
83.	17 September 2016	Cali, Colombia	Mozambique	14–2	15–3	2016 FIFA Futsal World Cup
84.	17 September 2016	Cali, Colombia	Mozambique	15–3	15–3	2016 FIFA Futsal World Cup
85.	21 September 2016	Bucaramanga, Colombia	Iran	1–0	4–4 (a.e.t.) (2–3 p)	2016 FIFA Futsal World Cup
86.	21 September 2016	Bucaramanga, Colombia	Iran	2–0	4–4 (a.e.t.) (2–3 p)	2016 FIFA Futsal World Cup
87.	21 September 2016	Bucaramanga, Colombia	Iran	4–3	4–4 (a.e.t.) (2–3 p)	2016 FIFA Futsal World Cup
