= Neguinho (futsal player, born 1992) =

Brazilian futsal player

Personal information
- Full name: Edison Machado Coelho
- Date of birth: 7 March 1992 (age 34)
- Place of birth: São Miguel do Oeste, Brazil
- Height: 1.92 m (6 ft 4 in)
- Positions: Winger; defender

Team information
- Current team: Pato Futsal
- Number: 7

Youth career
- ADR Toldo
- CRC Chapecó
- –2006: ASME
- 2007–2009: APAMA
- 2010: Jaraguá
- 2011–2012: Corinthians

Senior career*
Years	Team	Apps	(Gls)
2012–2014	Corinthians		
2015	Floripa		
2016	Sorocaba	26	(6)
2017	Pato Futsal	46	(18)
2022–	Bintang Timur Surabaya		

International career^{‡}
2012	Brazil U20		
2012–	Brazil		
- * Club domestic league appearances and goals as of 00:00, 1 July 2019 (UTC) ‡ National team caps and goals as of 00:00, 1 July 2019 (UTC)

Edison Machado Coelho (born 7 March 1992), better known as Neguinho, is a Brazilian futsal player who plays as a winger for Bintang Timur Surabaya and the Brazil national futsal team.

== Honours ==
Pato Futsal

- Liga Sul de Futsal: 2018
- Liga Nacional de Futsal: 2018, 2019

Bintang Timur Surabaya

- Indonesia Pro Futsal League: 2021-22
- AFF Futsal Cup: 2022

Brazil

- Copa América de Futsal: 2017
