= Lavoisier (disambiguation) =

Antoine Lavoisier (1743–1794) was a French chemist.

Lavoisier may also refer to:

== People ==
- Marie-Anne Paulze Lavoisier (1758–1836), French chemist, wife and collaborator of Antoine Lavoisier
- Lavoisier Freire Martins (born 1974), Brazilian futsal goalkeeper
- Lavoisier Maia (1928–2021), Brazilian physician and politician

== Other ==
- Lavoisier (crater), a lunar crater
- Lavoisier Group, an organisation based in Australia
- Lavoisier Island, a sub-Antarctic island
- Lavoisier Medal, a chemistry award
