= Sinoê =

Brazilian futsal player

Personal information
- Full name: Sinoê Alves Avencurt
- Date of birth: 25 April 1984 (age 42)
- Place of birth: Capão do Leão, Brazil
- Height: 1.68 m (5 ft 6 in)
- Position: Pivot

Team information
- Current team: Campo Mourão Futsal
- Number: 10

Youth career
- Brasil de Pelotas (football)

Senior career*
Years	Team	Apps	(Gls)
2005	Salto do Jacuí		
2006–2008	UCPel		
2009–2012	Carlos Barbosa		
2013	Intelli		
2014	Carlos Barbosa		
2015	Joinville		
2016	Nagoya Oceans		
2017–	Marreco	33	(19)

International career
2011–	Brazil		
- * Club domestic league appearances and goals as of 00:00, 7 March 2019 (UTC)

Sinoê Alves Avencurt (born 25 April 1984) is a Brazilian futsal player who plays as a pivot for Associação Campo Mourão Futsal and the Brazilian national futsal team.
