= Vander Carioca =

Brazilian futsal player

Personal information
- Full name: Vander dos Santos Ferreira
- Date of birth: 22 June 1976 (age 50)
- Place of birth: Rio de Janeiro, Brazil
- Height: 1.75 m (5 ft 9 in)
- Position: Forward

Youth career
- America-RJ

Senior career*
Years	Team	Apps	(Gls)
1995	Wimpro/Guarulhos		
1996	General Motors/Jambeiro		
1997	Atlético Mineiro		
1998	Flamengo		
2000–2001	Vasco da Gama		
2001–2003	Playas de Castellón		
2003–2004	Martorell		
2005	Arzignano		
2005–2008	Norilsk Nickel		
2009	Tyumen		
2010–2011	Petrópolis EC		
2012–2014	Joinville		
2015	Vasco da Gama		
2016–2018	Corinthians		
2021	Magé Futsal		

International career
1998–2004	Brazil	16	(14)
- * Club domestic league appearances and goals as of 12 September 2024

Vander dos Santos Ferreira (born 22 June 1976), better known as Vander Carioca, is a Brazilian retired professional futsal player who played as a forward.

== Career ==
Considered one of the greatest pivots of all time in Brazilian futsal, Vander Carioca came to play in America youth categories. In futsal, he began his career at Wimpro/Guarulhos, and played for countless Brazilian futsal clubs, in one of the longest careers in the category. He won the Brazilian National Futsal League twice, in 2000 with Vasco da Gama and 2016 with Corinthians, in addition to a Spanish title with Playas de Castellón in 2000–01.

Carioca was also part of the Brazil futsal team squads that played in the 2000 and 2004 FIFA Futsal World Cup, being runner-up in 2000 and third place in 2004, in addition to two Copa América titles.

He retired from Corinthians in 2018, but in 2021 he returned to the court at the age of 45 to defend the recently created Magé Futsal.

== Honours ==
Vasco da Gama

- Liga Nacional de Futsal: 2000

Playas de Castellón

- División de Honor de Futsal: 2000–01

Petrópolis

- Campeonato Carioca de Futsal: 2011

Joinville

- Campeonato Catarinense de Futsal: 2013, 2014

Corinthians

- Liga Nacional de Futsal: 2016

Brazil

- Copa América de Futsal: 1998, 1999
