= 2017 Copa Libertadores de Futsal =

Copa CONMEBOL Libertadores de Futsal Perú 2017

Tournament details
- Host country: Peru
- City: Lima
- Dates: 22–28 May 2017
- Teams: 12 (from 10 associations)
- Venues: 2 (in 1 host city)

Final positions
- Champions: (Brazil) Carlos Barbosa (5th title)
- Runners-up: (Paraguay) Cerro Porteño
- Third place: (Colombia) Real Antioquia
- Fourth place: (Paraguay) Afemec

Tournament statistics
- Matches played: 26
- Goals scored: 151 (5.81 per match)
- Top scorer: (Brazil) Deives Moraes
- Best player: (Brazil) Deives Moraes

The 2017 Copa CONMEBOL Libertadores de Futsal was the 17th edition of the Copa Libertadores de Futsal, South America's premier club futsal tournament organized by CONMEBOL.

The tournament was hosted by Peru and played from 22 to 28 May 2017.

== Teams ==
The competition was contested by 12 teams: one entry from each of the ten CONMEBOL associations, plus the title holders and an additional entry from the host association.

Association	Team	Qualifying method
Argentina	Kimberley AC	2016 Campeonato de Futsal AFA champions
Bolivia	Nantes	2016 Liga Nacional de Futsal runners-up (Note: Nantes replaced Rico Sur, the 2016 Liga Nacional de Futsal champions, who withdrew after the draw.)
Brazil	Carlos Barbosa	2016 Taça Brasil de Futsal champions
Chile	Santiago Wanderers	2016 Campeonato Nacional de Futsal ANFP champions
Colombia	Real Antioquia	2016 Superliga Colombiana de Fútsal champions
Ecuador	Società Sportiva Bocca	2015–16 Campeonato Nacional Futsal del Ecuador champions
Paraguay	Cerro Porteño	Title holders and 2016 Liga Nacional de Futsal FIFA champions
Paraguay	Afemec	2016 Liga Nacional de Futsal FIFA runners-up
Peru (hosts)	Primero de Mayo	2016 División de Honor de fútbol sala de Perú champions
Peru (hosts)	Panta Walon	2016 División de Honor de fútbol sala de Perú runners-up
Uruguay	Old Christians	2016 Campeonato Uruguayo de Fútbol Sala champions
Venezuela	Caracas	2016 Torneo Superior de Futsal champions

== Venues ==
The two venues in Lima were:

- Polideportivo 1 of the National Sports Village (VIDENA) of the Peruvian Sports Institute (IPD), with capacity for 2000 people.
- Coliseum of the Sports Complex of the Peruvian Football Federation (FPF), with capacity for 800 people.

== Draw ==
The draw of the tournament was held on 28 April 2017, 11:00 PET (UTC−5), at the headquarters of the Peruvian Football Federation in Lima. The 12 teams were drawn into three groups of four containing one team from each of the four seeding pots. The following three teams were seeded:

- Group A: champions of the host association, Primero de Mayo (Peru)
- Group B: 2016 Copa Libertadores de Futsal champions, Cerro Porteño (Paraguay)
- Group C: representatives of the association of the 2016 Copa Libertadores de Futsal runners-up, Carlos Barbosa (Brazil)

The other teams were seeded based on the results of their association in the 2016 Copa Libertadores de Futsal.

Seeds	Pot 1	Pot 2	Pot 3
(Peru) Primero de Mayo; (Paraguay) Cerro Porteño; (Brazil) Carlos Barbosa	(Colombia) Real Antioquia; (Argentina) Kimberley AC; (Bolivia) Rico Sur (later replaced by Nantes)	(Peru) Panta Walon; (Chile) Santiago Wanderers; (Uruguay) Old Christians	(Venezuela) Caracas; (Ecuador) Società Sportiva Bocca; (Paraguay) Afemec

== Squads ==
Each team had to submit a squad of 14 players, including a minimum of two goalkeepers (Regulations Article 4.1).

== Match officials ==
A total of 18 referees were appointed for the tournament.

== Group stage ==
The top two teams of each group and the two best third-placed teams advanced to the quarter-finals. The teams were ranked according to points (3 points for a win, 1 point for a draw, 0 points for a loss). If tied on points, tiebreakers were applied in the following order (Regulations Article 6.2):

1. Results in head-to-head matches between tied teams (points, goal difference, goals scored);
2. Goal difference in all matches;
3. Goals scored in all matches;
4. Drawing of lots.

All times were local, PET (UTC−5).

=== Group A ===
Pos	Team	Pld	W	D	L	GF	GA	GD	Pts	Qualification
1	(Paraguay) Afemec	3	2	1	0	14	3	+11	7	Knockout stage
2	(Peru) Primero de Mayo (H)	3	2	1	0	8	3	+5	7	Knockout stage
3	(Chile) Santiago Wanderers	3	1	0	2	7	14	−7	3	Knockout stage
4	(Bolivia) Nantes	3	0	0	3	2	11	−9	0	

Source: CONMEBOL
(H) Hosts
22 May 2017
14:00

Nantes (Bolivia)	0–7	(Paraguay) Afemec
	Report

22 May 2017
20:00

Primero de Mayo (Peru)	6–2	(Chile) Santiago Wanderers
	Report

23 May 2017
16:00

Afemec (Paraguay)	7–3	(Chile) Santiago Wanderers
	Report

23 May 2017
20:00

Primero de Mayo (Peru)	2–1	(Bolivia) Nantes
	Report

24 May 2017
16:00

Santiago Wanderers (Chile)	2–1	(Bolivia) Nantes
	Report

24 May 2017
18:00

Primero de Mayo (Peru)	0–0	(Paraguay) Afemec
	Report

=== Group B ===
Pos	Team	Pld	W	D	L	GF	GA	GD	Pts	Qualification
1	(Colombia) Real Antioquia	3	3	0	0	13	3	+10	9	Knockout stage
2	(Paraguay) Cerro Porteño	3	2	0	1	11	7	+4	6	Knockout stage
3	(Ecuador) Società Sportiva Bocca	3	1	0	2	10	14	−4	3	Knockout stage
4	(Uruguay) Old Christians	3	0	0	3	6	16	−10	0	

Source: CONMEBOL
22 May 2017
10:00

Società Sportiva Bocca (Ecuador)	6–5	(Uruguay) Old Christians
	Report

22 May 2017
12:00

Cerro Porteño (Paraguay)	1–4	(Colombia) Real Antioquia
	Report

23 May 2017
10:00

Real Antioquia (Colombia)	4–2	(Ecuador) Società Sportiva Bocca
	Report

23 May 2017
12:00

Old Christians (Uruguay)	1–5	(Paraguay) Cerro Porteño
	Report

24 May 2017
10:00

Cerro Porteño (Paraguay)	5–2	(Ecuador) Società Sportiva Bocca
	Report

24 May 2017
12:00

Real Antioquia (Colombia)	5–0	(Uruguay) Old Christians
	Report

=== Group C ===
Pos	Team	Pld	W	D	L	GF	GA	GD	Pts	Qualification
1	(Brazil) Carlos Barbosa	3	3	0	0	16	5	+11	9	Knockout stage
2	(Argentina) Kimberley AC	3	2	0	1	11	6	+5	6	Knockout stage
3	(Venezuela) Caracas	3	0	1	2	7	12	−5	1	
4	(Peru) Panta Walon (H)	3	0	1	2	5	16	−11	1	

Source: CONMEBOL
(H) Hosts
22 May 2017
16:00

Carlos Barbosa (Brazil)	4–1	(Argentina) Kimberley AC
	Report

22 May 2017
18:00

Panta Walon (Peru)	3–3	(Venezuela) Caracas
	Report

23 May 2017
14:00

Caracas (Venezuela)	3–5	(Brazil) Carlos Barbosa
	Report

23 May 2017
18:00

Panta Walon (Peru)	1–6	(Argentina) Kimberley AC
	Report

24 May 2017
14:00

Kimberley AC (Argentina)	4–1	(Venezuela) Caracas
	Report

24 May 2017
20:00

Panta Walon (Peru)	1–7	(Brazil) Carlos Barbosa
	Report

=== Ranking of third-placed teams ===
Pos	Grp	Team	Pld	W	D	L	GF	GA	GD	Pts	Qualification
1	B	(Ecuador) Società Sportiva Bocca	3	1	0	2	10	14	−4	3	Knockout stage
2	A	(Chile) Santiago Wanderers	3	1	0	2	7	14	−7	3	Knockout stage
3	C	(Venezuela) Caracas	3	0	1	2	7	12	−5	1	

Source: CONMEBOL

In the quarter-finals:

- The 1st best runner-up would play the winner of Group B.
- The 2nd best runner-up would play the winner of Group A.

== Knockout stage ==
In the quarter-finals, semi-finals and final, extra time and penalty shoot-out were used to decide the winner if necessary. In the third place match, penalty shoot-out (no extra time) were used to decide the winner if necessary.

=== Bracket ===
Quarter-finals
26 May
(Paraguay) Afemec	5
(Chile) Santiago Wanderers	1
26 May
(Paraguay) Cerro Porteño	3
(Argentina) Kimberley AC	2
26 May
(Colombia) Real Antioquia	6
(Ecuador) Società Sportiva Bocca	2
26 May
(Brazil) Carlos Barbosa (p)	2 (2)
(Peru) Primero de Mayo	2 (1)

Semi-finals
27 May
(Paraguay) Afemec	1
(Paraguay) Cerro Porteño	5
27 May
(Colombia) Real Antioquia	1
(Brazil) Carlos Barbosa	4

Final
28 May
(Paraguay) Cerro Porteño	1
(Brazil) Carlos Barbosa	2
Third place
28 May
(Paraguay) Afemec	2 (2)
(Colombia) Real Antioquia (p)	2 (3)

=== Quarter-finals ===
26 May 2017
14:00

Afemec (Paraguay)	5–1	(Chile) Santiago Wanderers
	Report

26 May 2017
16:00

Real Antioquia (Colombia)	6–2	(Ecuador) Società Sportiva Bocca
	Report

26 May 2017
18:00

Cerro Porteño (Paraguay)	3–2	(Argentina) Kimberley AC
	Report

26 May 2017
20:00

Carlos Barbosa (Brazil)	2–2 (a.e.t.)	(Peru) Primero de Mayo
	Report
Penalties
	2–1

=== Semi-finals ===
27 May 2017
17:00

Afemec (Paraguay)	1–5	(Paraguay) Cerro Porteño
	Report

27 May 2017
19:00

Real Antioquia (Colombia)	1–4	(Brazil) Carlos Barbosa
	Report

=== Third place match ===
28 May 2017
17:00

Afemec (Paraguay)	2–2	(Colombia) Real Antioquia
	Report
Penalties
	2–3

=== Final ===
28 May 2017
19:00

Cerro Porteño (Paraguay)	1–2	(Brazil) Carlos Barbosa
	Report
