= Neguinho =

Neguinho may refer to:

- Neguinho (futsal player, born 1992), Brazilian futsal winger Edison Machado Coelho
- Neguinho (futsal player, born 2000), Brazilian futsal defender João Victor Alves Sena
- Neguinho da Beija-Flor (born 1949), Brazilian samba singer and composer
- Neguinho do Samba (died 2009), Brazilian percussionist and musician
- Neguinho de Zé Ferreira (1970–1997), Brazilian mass muderer
