= Sol Sales =

Brazilian futsal player

Personal information
- Full name: Sol e Mar Stroesner Sales de Jesus
- Date of birth: 9 November 1988 (age 37)
- Place of birth: São Luís, Brazil
- Height: 1.78 m (5 ft 10 in)
- Position: Winger

Team information
- Current team: Marreco
- Number: 11

Senior career*
Years	Team	Apps	(Gls)
2011–2013	Foz Futsal		
2014	Crateús		
2014–2016	Umuarama		
2017–	Marreco	40	(8)

International career^{‡}
2018–	Brazil		
- * Club domestic league appearances and goals as of 00:00, 4 June 2019 (UTC) ‡ National team caps and goals as of 00:00, 4 June 2019 (UTC)

Sol e Mar Stroesner Sales de Jesus (born 9 November 1988) is a Brazilian futsal player who plays as a winger for Marreco and the Brazilian national futsal team.
