= Associação Joaçaba Esporte e Cultura =

Brazilian futsal club

Joaçaba
- Full name: Associação Joaçaba Esporte e Cultura
- Founded: 31 January 2001; 24 years ago
- Ground: Centro de Eventos da UNOESC
- Capacity: 5500
- Chairman: Maicon Eduardo Bortoluz
- Coach: Vandré
- League: LNF
- 2022: Overall table: 11th of 22; Playoffs: Round of 16
colours	colours

Associação Joaçaba Esporte e Cultura, is a Brazilian futsal club from Joaçaba. The team currently plays in Liga Futsal.

== Current squad ==
As of 23 May 2019

#	Position	Name	Nationality
2	Goalkeeper	Leo Gugiel	(Brazil)
3	Goalkeeper	Andrey da Caz	(Brazil)
4	Defender	Pirulito	(Brazil)
7	Winger	Adriano Lemos	(Brazil)
9	Pivot	Gabriel dos Santos	(Brazil)
9	Pivot	Rafa Stocker	(Brazil)
10	Winger	Duh Moura	(Brazil)
11	Pivot	Raul Weber	(Brazil)
12	Winger	Giancarlos Antoniazzi	(Brazil)
13	Winger	Richard da Silva	(Brazil)
18	Winger	Felipinho	(Brazil)
22	Goalkeeper	Pedro Henrique	(Brazil)
23	Winger	Jhony Franceschetto	(Brazil)
29	Defender	Duio	(Albania)
30	Defender	Dudu Farias	(Brazil)
32	Winger	Yan de Deus	(Brazil)
98	Pivot	Lucas Miguel	(Brazil)
