= Santos FC Futsal =

Santos
- Full name: Santos Futebol Clube
- Nicknames: Peixe (Fish); Santástico (Santastic); Alvinegro praiano (Beach black-and-white); Clube do povo (Club of the people)
- Founded: 2011
- Dissolved: December 27, 2011
- Ground: Arena Santos, Santos, Brazil
- Capacity: 5,120
- Website: http://www.santosfc.com.br
Home colors	Away colors

Santos Futebol Clube (Brazilian Portuguese: [ˈsɐ̃tus futʃiˈbɔw ˈklubi]; Santos Football Club), also known as Santos and familiarly as Peixe (pronounced [ˈpejʃi]), was a Brazilian professional futsal club, based in Santos, Brazil. They play in the Liga Futsal, Brazil's national league.

== History ==
Santos Futebol Clube was founded on April 14, 1912. The futsal department was created in 2011, after a partnership between Santos Futebol Clube and Cortiana Plásticos. Falcão has been signed for the club, to play for two seasons. They won the Copa Gramado in 2011, after beating Krona Futsal 3–1 on March 3, 2011. Santos debuted in the 2011 Liga Futsal on March 14, 2011, against Krona Futsal, at Ginásio da Univille, in Joinville, Santa Catarina. They beat Krona Futsal 3–2. Santos won the 2011 liga Futsal after beating Carlos Barbosa on penalties. Due to lack of funds, the club was dissolved on December 27, 2011.

== Achievements ==
- Liga Futsal (1): 2011
- Copa Gramado (1): 2011

== Arena ==
Santos Futebol Clube played their home games at Arena Santos. The stadium has a maximum capacity of 5,000 people.

== See also ==
- Santos FC
- Santos FC (women)
- Santos FC (beach soccer)
- Santos FC Futebol de mesa
- Santos FC Judô
- Santos FC Caratê
