= Marreco Futsal =

Brazilian futsal club

- Full name: Associação Amigos do Marreco Futsal
- Founded: 15 November 2007; 17 years ago
- Ground: Complexo Esportivo Arrudão
- Capacity: 3,500
- Chairman: Ivo Dolinski
- Coach: Banana
- League: LNF
- 2022: Overall table: 14th of 22; Playoffs: Round of 16
colours	colours

Associação Amigos do Marreco Futsal, is a Brazilian futsal club from Francisco Beltrão founded in 2007 which plays in Liga Futsal.

== Club honours ==
=== State competitions ===
- Taça Paraná de Futsal: 2011
- Chave Prata: 2008
- Jogos Abertos do Paraná Divisão A (2): 2011, 2015

== Current squad ==
As of 23 May 2019

#	Position	Name	Nationality
2	Goalkeeper	Marquinhos	(Brazil)
3	Defender	Fabiano Assad	(Italy)
6	Universal	Alexandre Pintinho	(Brazil)
8	Winger	Felipe Monteiro	(Brazil)
10	Pivot	Sinoê	(Brazil)
11	Winger	Sol Sales	(Brazil)
13	Defender	Douglas Moraes	(Brazil)
14	Winger	Glauber da Silva	(Brazil)
15	Goalkeeper	Quinzinho	(Brazil)
17	Defender	Kauê Araújo	(Brazil)
18	Pivot	Paulo Felipe	(Brazil)
19	Winger	Pedro Rei	(Brazil)
20	Goalkeeper	Di Fanti	(Brazil)
21	Winger	Paulinho	(Brazil)
31	Winger	Juninho	(Brazil)
50	Goalkeeper	Carlos Oliveira	(Brazil)
77	Winger	Zequinha	(Brazil)
91	Winger	Juninho Carioca	(Brazil)
93	Defender	Max Pinheiro	(Brazil)
99	Winger	Fabinho	(Brazil)
