= Ali Bin Hamad al-Attiyah Arena =

Sports arena in Al Rayyan, Qatar

- Interactive map of Ali Bin Hamad al-Attiyah Arena
- Location: Al Rayyan, Qatar
- Coordinates: 25.270111°N 51.489956°E
- Capacity: 7,700

Construction
- Opened: November 2014
- Cost: USD $ 142 million EUR € 110 million

Tenant
- Al-Sadd Sports Club

Ali Bin Hamad al-Attiyah Arena (Arabic: صالة علي بن حمد العطية), is an indoor sports arena in Al Rayyan, Qatar. It was built for the Qatar Olympic Committee, in order to host the 2015 World Men's Handball Championship.

After the tournament, the management of the arena was transferred to Al-Sadd Sports Club, to become the home venue for Al Sadd Handball Team.

== International sports events ==
The arena has hosted the following international sports events:

- 2015 World Men's Handball Championship
- 2015 AIBA World Boxing Championships
- 2016 Futsal Intercontinental Cup
- 2016 ITTF World Tour Grand Finals
- 2016 FIDE World Rapid and Blitz Championships
- QPW SuperSlam 2017
- 2023 World Judo Championships
- UFC Fight Night: Tsarukyan vs. Hooker
- UFC Fight Night: Procházka vs. Stirling

It will also serve as the venue for the 2027 FIBA Basketball World Cup.
