= João Salla =

Brazilian futsal player (born 1996)

Personal information
- Full name: João Vitor Salla Vivan
- Date of birth: 31 May 1996 (age 30)
- Place of birth: Nova Prata, Brazil
- Height: 1.84 m (6 ft 0 in)
- Position: Defender

Team information
- Current team: Carlos Barbosa
- Number: 7

Youth career
- Veranópolis
- Grêmio (football)
- Veranópolis
- Carlos Barbosa

Senior career*
Years	Team	Apps	(Gls)
2017–	Carlos Barbosa	37	(17)

International career
2017–	Brazil		
- * Club domestic league appearances and goals as of 00:00, 5 March 2019 (UTC)

João Vitor Salla Vivan (born 31 May 1996) is a Brazilian futsal player who plays as a defender for Carlos Barbosa and the Brazilian national futsal team.
