= Associação Desportiva Futsal Tubaronense =

Brazilian futsal club

Tubarão Futsal
- Full name: Associação Desportiva Futsal Tubaronense
- Founded: 10 October 2004; 20 years ago
- Ground: Ginásio Estener Soratto
- Capacity: 3,600
- Chairman: Eduardo Esmeraldino Rigotti
- Coach: Bruno Silva
- League: LNF
- 2022: 20th of 22
colours	colours

Associação Desportiva Futsal Tubaronense, known as Tubarão, is a Brazilian futsal club from Tubarão. It has won one Campeonato Catarinense. The club is a partnership with Unisul Esporte Clube, which owns the Liga Futsal franchise spot.

== Club honours ==
=== State competitions ===
- Campeonato Catarinense de Futsal: 2018

== Current squad ==
As of 23 May 2019

#	Position	Name	Nationality
5	Defender	Ferrugem	(Brazil)
7	Defender	Júlio César	(Brazil)
8	Defender	João Rigotti	(Brazil)
9	Pivot	Carlos Ronaldo	(Brazil)
10	Winger	Jedi Mota	(Brazil)
11	Winger	Rodriguinho	(Brazil)
14	Winger	Serginho	(Brazil)
17	Winger	Rodrigo Acco	(Brazil)
18	Winger	Vandinho	(Brazil)
20	Goalkeeper	Marcinho	(Brazil)
23	Goalkeeper	Henrique Barbieri	(Brazil)
27	Winger	Dieguinho	(Brazil)
70	Goalkeeper	Nicolas Martins	(Brazil)
77	Winger	Pakito	(Brazil)
98	Defender	Diego Passamani	(Brazil)
99	Pivot	Jean Paulo	(Brazil)
