= Canoas Sport Club =

Brazilian football club

Canoas
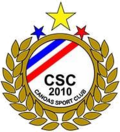
- Full name: Canoas Sport Club
- Nickname: Tricolor Canoense
- Founded: January 23, 1998 (28 years ago)
- Ground: Complexo Esportivo da Ulbra, Canoas, Brazil
- Capacity: 6750
- President: Gilson Alves Bernardo
- Head coach: Lorival Santos
Home colors	Away colors

Canoas Sport Club, usually known as Canoas, is a Brazilian football club from Canoas, Rio Grande do Sul, founded by the Lutheran University of Brazil (in Portuguese, Universidade Luterana do Brasil - ULBRA). The club is also active in futsal. The club was originally named Sport Club Ulbra and then Universidade Sport Club.

== History ==
On January 26, 1998, the club was founded by the Lutheran University of Brazil as Sport Club Ulbra. The club started with volleyball, futsal, handball, and athletics sections.

In 2001, the club started its football department, and joined the Rio Grande do Sul Football Federation.

In 2002, Ulbra competed in the Campeonato Gaúcho Third Division and the Second Division, because the competition's regulation allowed a club to play in both divisions in the same year. The club also participated in the national third division, the Campeonato Brasileiro Série C for the first time. The club was eliminated in the quarterfinals by Marília.

In 2003, the club won the Campeonato Gaúcho Second Division, and was promoted to the First Division for the following season. The club again competed in the Campeonato Brasileiro Série C. Ulbra was eliminated in the second stage by another club from the same state, RS.

In 2004, Ulbra was the Campeonato Gaúcho's runner-up. The club beat Grêmio 3-1 in the semifinals, but was defeated by Internacional in the final. The club competed again in the Campeonato Brasileiro Série C and was eliminated by Hermann Aichinger in the second stage.

In 2005, the club entered the national cup competition, the Copa do Brasil, for the first time. Ulbra was eliminated in the first round by Treze. In 2006 the club competed in the Campeonato Brasileiro Série C, but was eliminated in the second stage of the competition, and in 2007, the club was eliminated in the third stage of the championship.

The club was renamed to Universidade Sport Club in December 2009. The club was renamed to Canoas Sport Club on November 26, 2010.

== Football ==
=== Stadium ===
The club's home matches are usually played at Complexo Esportivo da Ulbra stadium, which has a maximum capacity of 5,000 people.

=== Honours ===
- Campeonato Gaúcho
  - Runners-up (1): 2004
- Copa FGF
  - Runners-up (2): 2005, 2006
- Campeonato Gaúcho Série A2
  - Winners (1): 2003
- Campeonato do Interior Gaúcho
  - Winners (1): 2004

=== Current squad ===
Note: Flags indicate national team as defined under FIFA eligibility rules; some limited exceptions apply. Players may hold more than one non-FIFA nationality.

No.	Pos.	Nation	Player
—	GK	BRA	Rafael Dal-Ri
—	GK	BRA	Evandro
—	GK	BRA	Márcio
—	DF	BRA	Carlinhos
—	DF	BRA	Marcão
—	DF	BRA	Bronzati
—	DF	BRA	Tiago Saletti
—	DF	BRA	Caçapa
—	DF	BRA	Leandro Xavier
—	DF	BRA	Teco
—	DF	BRA	Gélson Ventura
—	DF	BRA	Jonathan
—	MF	BRA	Éder Lazzari

No.	Pos.	Nation	Player
—	MF	BRA	Vanderson
—	MF	BRA	Cadu
—	MF	BRA	Ânderson Cruz
—	MF	BRA	Richardson
—	MF	BRA	Júnior
—	MF	BRA	Éverton Severo
—	MF	BRA	Diogo Rincón
—	FW	BRA	Flavinho
—	FW	BRA	Jacques
—	FW	BRA	Éber
—	FW	BRA	Gustavo
—	FW	BRA	Leandro Rodrigues
—	FW	BRA	Edílson
—	DF	BRA	Roberto Carvalho Cauê

== Futsal ==
=== Titles ===
- Intercontinental Futsal Cup (3): 1997, 1999, 2001
- Liga Futsal (3): 1998, 2002, 2003

=== Current squad ===
Note: Flags indicate national team as defined under FIFA eligibility rules; some limited exceptions apply. Players may hold more than one non-FIFA nationality.

No.	Pos.	Nation	Player
1	GK	BRA	Lavoisier
4	MF	BRA	Cris
5	DF	BRA	Lucas
6	DF	BRA	André
7	MF	BRA	Marinho
8	MF	BRA	Canabarro
9	FW	BRA	Índio
11	MF	BRA	Bruno Souza

No.	Pos.	Nation	Player
13	MF	BRA	Pica-Pau
14	FW	BRA	Caio
16	MF	BRA	Valtinho
18	MF	BRA	Alexandre
19	GK	BRA	Léo
20	GK	BRA	Cris Zaparoli
21	MF	BRA	P. C.
25	FW	BRA	Augusto

== Colors ==
The club's colors are blue, white and red.

== Other sports ==
Besides football and futsal, Canoas also has other sports sections, such as volleyball, judo, basketball, tennis, athletics and trampolining.
