= Liga Futsal 2010 =

The Liga Futsal 2010 is the premier futsal league in Brazil in the 15th edition. It is organized by the Brazilian Futsal Confederation (CBFS).

== The Championship ==
=== First phase ===
Pos	Team	Pld	W	D	L	GF	GA	GD	Pts
1	Joinville	20	14	4	2	54	32	+22	46
2	Corinthians/São Caetano	20	13	3	4	58	42	+16	42
3	Jaraguá	20	11	6	3	84	51	+33	39
4	Carlos Barbosa	20	11	5	4	60	35	+25	38
5	Orlândia	20	12	1	7	60	47	+13	37
6	Marechal Rondon	20	10	4	6	46	35	+11	34
7	Umuarama	20	9	7	4	56	52	+4	34
8	Florianópolis	20	10	2	8	61	53	+8	32
9	Foz do Iguaçú	20	8	6	6	46	39	+7	30
10	Minas	20	8	5	7	59	53	+6	29
11	Petrópolis	20	7	7	6	61	49	+12	28
12	Atlântico (Erechim)	20	7	5	8	53	71	−18	26
13	Macaé	20	8	1	11	59	55	+4	25
14	Venâncio Aires	20	7	4	9	45	55	−10	25
15	Cascavel	20	6	4	10	57	64	−7	22
16	Praia Clube	20	6	3	11	45	70	−25	21
17	Garça	20	5	5	10	50	61	−11	20
18	Farroupilha	20	4	5	11	41	61	−20	17
19	Anápolis	20	4	2	14	44	73	−29	14
20	São Paulo	20	3	5	12	39	61	−22	14
21	Unisul/Tubarão	20	3	4	13	57	80	−23	13

=== Second phase ===
==== Group A ====
Pos	Team	Pld	W	D	L	GF	GA	GD	Pts
1	Carlos Barbosa	10	6	1	3	33	29	+4	19
2	Marechal Rondon	10	5	2	3	24	21	+3	17
3	Joinville	10	4	3	3	27	21	+6	15
4	Atlântico (Erechim)	10	4	2	4	29	27	+2	14
5	Minas	10	3	3	4	37	40	−3	12
6	Florianópolis	10	1	3	9	21	33	−12	6

==== Group B ====
Pos	Team	Pld	W	D	L	GF	GA	GD	Pts
1	Corinthians/São Caetano	10	8	2	0	38	14	+24	26
2	Jaraguá	10	7	0	3	31	28	+3	21
3	Orlândia	10	5	0	5	31	29	+2	15
4	Petrópolis	10	3	3	4	31	30	+1	12
5	Umuarama	10	3	0	7	31	39	−18	9
6	Foz do Iguaçú	10	1	1	8	18	40	−22	4

=== Quarterfinals ===
Teams			Scores		Tie-breaker
Team #1	Points	Team #2	1st leg	2nd leg	Extra-time
Atlântico (Arechim)	1:4	Corinthians/São Caetano	1–1	3–5	–
Orlândia	3:3	Marechal Rondon	2–0	3–4	0–3
Petrópolis	1:4	Carlos Barbosa	2–2	3–6	–
Joinville	1:4	Jaraguá	2–2	1–4	–

=== Semifinals ===
Teams			Scores		Tie-breaker
Team #1	Points	Team #2	1st leg	2nd leg	Extra-time
Marechal Rondon	4:1	Corinthians/São Caetano	2–0	1–1	–
Carlos Barbosa	0:6	Jaraguá	1–2	1–3	–

=== Final ===
Teams			Scores		Tie-breaker
Team #1	Points	Team #2	1st leg	2nd leg	Extra-time
Marechal Rondon	1:4	Jaraguá	2–2	0–2	–
