= Arena Jaraguá =

Indoor arena in Jaraguá do Sul, Brazil

Coordinates: 26°29′24″S 49°5′41″W

- Interactive map of Arena Jaraguá
- Location: Jaraguá do Sul, Brazil
- Owner: Fundação Municipal de Esportes (FME)
- Capacity: 8,000

Construction
- Opened: May 2007

Tenant
- Associação Desportiva Jaraguá

Arena Jaraguá is an indoor sporting arena located in Jaraguá do Sul, Brazil. It is used mainly for futsal and volleyball. The capacity of the arena is 15,000 people and it was built in 2007. Malwee/Jaraguá plays its home matches at the stadium. UFC on FX: Belfort vs. Rockhold took place at the arena on May 18, 2013.
