= Blumenau Futsal =

Brazilian futsal club

- Full name: Blumenau Futsal
- Founded: 1 March 2017; 8 years ago
- Ground: Complexo Esportivo Bernardo Werner
- Capacity: 5,000
- Chairman: Alexandre Jahn
- Coach: Paulinho Cardoso
- League: LNF
- 2022: 22nd of 22
colours	colours

Blumenau Futsal, is a Brazilian futsal club from Blumenau founded in 2017 which plays in Liga Nacional de Futsal. The club was founded when Blumenau based AD Hering disbanded its futsal team after the 2015 season, opening a franchise position which was bought by the new club.

== Club honours ==
=== State competitions ===
- Copa Santa Catarina: 2017
- Jogos Abertos de Santa Catarina (2): 2019, 2021

== Current squad ==
As of 27 May 2023

#	Position	Name	Nationality
2	Goalkeeper	Kelwin Schmitt	(Brazil)
20	Goalkeeper	Marcinho	(Brazil)
7	Defender	Deivão	(Brazil)
22	Defender	João Pará	(Brazil)
29	Defender	Duio	(Albania)
98	Defender	Ângelo Passamani	(Brazil)
5	Winger	Théu Behnem	(Brazil)
8	Winger	Igor Gamarra	(Brazil)
10	Winger	Diogo Schlemper	(Brazil)
11	Winger	William Endler	(Brazil)
15	Winger	Lucas Fagundes	(Brazil)
16	Winger	Xuxa	(Brazil)
18	Winger	Lucas Schwartz	(Brazil)
49	Winger	Jefe Seco	(Brazil)
77	Winger	Jean Peruzzo	(Brazil)
88	Winger	Marquinhos	(Brazil)
9	Pivot	Lucas Miguel	(Brazil)
30	Pivot	Toninho	(Brazil)
