= Pato Futsal =

Brazilian futsal club

- Full name: Pato Futsal
- Founded: 2010
- Ground: Arena Cláudio Petrycoski
- Capacity: 5.000
- Chairman: Ricardo José Carnieletto
- Coach: Luciano Bonfim
- League: LNF
- 2022: Overall table: 13th of 22; Playoffs: Quarterfinals
colours	colours

Pato Futsal, is a Brazilian futsal club from Pato Branco. Founded in 2010 it has won two Liga Futsal and one Taça Brasil de Futsal.

== Club honours ==
=== National competitions ===
- Liga Futsal: 2018, 2019
- Taça Brasil de Futsal: 2018
- Copa do Brasil de Futsal: 2022

=== Regional competitions ===
- Liga Sul de Futsal: 2018

=== State competitions ===
- Chave Ouro: 2017, 2023, 2024, 2025
- Chave Prata (2): 2002, 2011, 2016
- Jogos Abertos do Paraná Divisão B: 2013

== Current squad ==
As of 16 Jan 2026

#	Position	Name	Nationality
1	Goalkeeper	Djony Mendes	(Brazil)
3	Goalkeeper	Alysson	(Brazil)
33	Goalkeeper	Renato	(Brazil)
8	Fixed	Gleidson	(Brazil)
17	Fixed	Hiago	(Brazil)
77	Fixed	Biel	(Brazil)
93	Fixed	Max	(Brazil)
30	Wings	Micael	(Brazil)
5	Wings	Zé Marques	(Brazil)
7	Wings	Guilherme	(Brazil)
10	Wings	Neto	(Brazil)
11	Wings	Duduzinho	(Brazil)
12	Winger	Vitinho	(Brazil)
14	Winger	Dudu	(Brazil)
15	Winger	Maicon	(Brazil)
16	Winger	Léo Catolé	(Brazil)
19	Winger	Mendes	(Brazil)
9	Pivots	Calvanese	(Brazil)
28	Pivots	Brayan	(Brazil)
29	Pivots	Gui Reis	(Brazil)
