= Intercontinental Futsal Cup =

The Intercontinental Futsal Cup is an international futsal club competition. Clubs from Asia, Europe, and South America primarily compete against each other, though teams from other continents have also participated over the years.

The tournament is usually organized by national federations or leagues. There are no official FIFA's sources stating that any of the tournament editions were included in the list of official tournaments which organized by the FIFA or with FIFA brand in the name. The tournament's status has always been unofficial.

== History ==
The Intercontinental Futsal Cup is held every year. The first event was held in 1997, in Porto Alegre. Since 2016 it is organized by LNFS and the Football Federation of Qatar.

In 2014 the official name of the tournament was World Futsal Super Cup.

The Intercontinental Futsal Cup is held every year. The first event was held in 1997 in Porto Alegre. Since 2016, it has been organized by LNFS and the Football Federation of Qatar. In 2014, the official name of the tournament was the World Futsal Super Cup.

The 2026 edition, organized by Mundo do Futsal, is scheduled to be held in November 2026 in Pato Branco, Paraná, Brazil. Confirmed participants include Bintang Timur (champion of the Pro Futsal League 2025–2026) and AlUla SC from Saudi Arabia, alongside Pato Futsal (Brazil, hosts), Palma (Spain, defending Intercontinental champions), Sporting CP (Portugal, champion of the 2025–26 UEFA Futsal Champions League), and the champion of the Copa Libertadores de Futsal.

== List of champions ==
Number	Year	Champion	Score	Runner-up	Host
1	1997	Internacional	4–2	FC Barcelona	Porto Alegre (Brazil)
2	1997	Dina Moskva	0–0 (5–4 pen), 3–2, 4–2	Internacional	Moscow (Russia)
3	1998	Atlético Mineiro	5–6, 4–0, 4–3	Dina Moskva	Moscow (Russia)
4	1999	Ulbra	4–4 (5–3 pen), 3–2, 3–4	Dina Moskva	Moscow (Russia)
5	2000	Caja Segovia	Group	Atlético Mineiro	Moscow (Russia)
6	2001	Ulbra	Group	Dina Moskva	Moscow (Russia)
—	2002	not held			
—	2003	not held			
7	2004	Carlos Barbosa	6 – 3	Playas de Castellón	Barcelona (Spain)
8	2005	Boomerang Interviú	5 – 2	Jaraguá	Puertollano (Spain)
9	2006	Boomerang Interviú	1 – 0	Jaraguá	Brusque (Brazil)
10	2007	Boomerang Interviú	3 – 1	Jaraguá	Portimão (Portugal)
11	2008	Interviú Fadesa	6 – 1	Jaraguá	Granada (Spain)
—	2009	not held			
—	2010	not held			
12	2011	Inter Movistar	2 – 1	Carlos Barbosa	Alcalá de Henares (Spain)
13	2012	Carlos Barbosa	4 – 1	Inter Movistar	Carlos Barbosa (Brazil)
14	2013	Dinamo Moskva	5 – 1	Carlos Barbosa	Greensboro (United States)
15	2014	Kairat	3 – 2	Dinamo Moskva	Almaty (Kazakhstan)
16	2015	Atlântico	4 – 3 (aet)	Kairat	Erechim (Brazil)
17	2016	Sorocaba	4 – 3 (aet)	Carlos Barbosa	Doha (Qatar)
—	2017	not held			
18	2018	Magnus	2 – 0	Carlos Barbosa	Bangkok (Thailand)
19	2019	Magnus	2 – 2 (3 – 1 pen.)	Boca Juniors	Bangkok (Thailand)
—	2020	not held			
—	2021	not held			
—	2022	not held			
20	2023	Palma	3 – 3 (4 – 3 pen.)	Cascavel	Foz do Iguaçu (Brazil)
21	2024	Palma	4 – 1	Magnus	Palma de Mallorca (Spain)
22	2025	Palma	4 – 2	Peñarol	Palma de Mallorca (Spain)
23	2026	Sporting CP	5 – 4	Palma	Pato Branco (Brazil)

In the 2nd, 3rd, and 4th tournaments (three-game series), teams received three points for a win (in regulation time or in extra time) and one point for a draw. If teams were tied on points, the winner was determined by the goal difference over the three matches. For winning a penalty shootout after a draw, a team received an additional point, but it was counted only if the teams had the same number of main points and the same goal difference. Based on the results, the winners in these tournaments were determined after the third matches. A penalty shootout victory was decisive in determining the title in 1999.

Internacional competed as Inter/Ulbra for sponsorship reasons in the 1st and 2nd tournaments in 1997. Later the ULBRA had created its own team.

== Titles by club ==
Club winners	Winners
Inter FS (as Boomerang Interviú, Interviú Fadesa, and Inter Movistar)	5
Sorocaba (as Magnus Futsal); Palma	3
Ulbra; Carlos Barbosa	2
Sporting CP; Internacional; Dina Moskva; Atlético Mineiro (as Atlético Mineiro/Pax de Minas); Caja Segovia; Dinamo Moskva; Kairat; Atlântico	1

== Titles by country ==
Country	Winners	Club winners
Brazil	10	Sorocaba (3); Ulbra (2); Carlos Barbosa (2); Internacional (1); Atlético Pax de Minas (1); Atlântico (1)
Spain	9	Inter (5); Palma (3); Caja Segovia (1)
Russia	2	Dina Moskva (1); Dinamo Moskva (1)
Portugal	1	Sporting CP (1)
Kazakhstan	1	Kairat (1)
