= São José Futsal =

Brazilian futsal club

São José
- Full name: São José Futsal
- Founded: 6 October 2006; 18 years ago
- Ground: Ginásio Tênis Clube
- Capacity: 2,500
- Chairman: Roberto Rocha Brandão
- Coach: Douglinhas
- League: LNF
- 2022: Overall table: 7th of 22; Playoffs: Round of 16
colours	colours

São José Futsal, is a Brazilian futsal club from São José dos Campos founded in 2006 which plays in Liga Futsal.

== Club honours ==
=== National competitions ===
- Jogos Abertos Brasileiros (3): 2007, 2011, 2012

=== State competitions ===
- Liga Paulista de Futsal (2): 2007, 2008

== Current squad ==
As of 25 May 2019

#	Position	Name	Nationality
18	Goalkeeper	Daniel Cardozo	(Brazil)
5	Defender	Romada	(Brazil)
7	Defender	Fabrício Lima	(Brazil)
8	Winger	Yuri Gavião	(Brazil)
9	Pivot	Xuxa	(Brazil)
10	Winger	Nikolas Costa	(Brazil)
13	Winger	Vandinho	(Brazil)
14	Pivot	Banana	(Brazil)
16	Winger	Biel Cardoso	(Brazil)
17	Defender	Pelé	(Brazil)
25	Defender	Gabriel Farina	(Brazil)
33	Goalkeeper	Rafa Pias	(Brazil)
50	Goalkeeper	Juninho	(Brazil)
77	Winger	Gê Silva	(Brazil)
90	Winger	Gustavinho	(Brazil)
97	Winger	Matheus Alegria	(Brazil)
99	Pivot	Don	(Brazil)
	Winger	Vitinho	(Brazil)
