= Taça Brasil de Futsal =

Brazilian futsal championship

The Taça Brasil de Futsal (Portuguese for Brazil Futsal Trophy) is a Brazilian futsal championship. It was the only futsal competition in Brazil until 1996, when the Liga Futsal started.

The Taça Brasil is one of the most traditional Brazilian Futsal Confederation (CBFS) competitions. The competition reunites representatives of the states (mostly of them are the state champions).

The first edition was disputed in 1968, in Lages, Santa Catarina state, and the champion was Carioca from Rio de Janeiro state, with Palmeiras from São Paulo finishing as the runner-up. Until 1980, the tournament took place every two years. Since 1981, the competition is disputed annually.

== List of winners ==
Year	Champion	Host city
1968	Carioca (RJ)	Lages (SC)
1970	Palmeiras (SP)	Natal (RN)
1972	Sumov (CE)	Recife (PE)
1974	Corinthians (SP)	Brasília (DF)
1976	Náutico (PE)	Cuiabá (MT)
1978	Sumov (CE)	Londrina (PR)
1980	Sumov (CE)	Natal (RN)
1981	Monte Sinai (RJ)	Cuiabá (MT)
1982	Sumov (CE)	Fortaleza (CE)
1983	Vasco da Gama (RJ)	São Paulo (SP)
1984	Atlântica (RJ)	Rio de Janeiro (RJ)
1985	Atlético Mineiro (MG)	Fortaleza (CE)
1986	Sumov (CE)	Curitiba (PR)
1987	Perdigão (SC)	São Paulo (SP)
1988	Água Branca (SP)	Caxias do Sul (RS)
1989	Enxuta (RS)	Rio de Janeiro (RJ)
1990	Perdigão (SC)	Videira (SC)
1991	Banfort (CE)	Belo Horizonte (MG)
1992	Banespa (SP)	Arapoti (PR)
1993	INPACEL (PR)	Cuiabá (MT)
1994	INPACEL (PR)	Natal (RN)
1995	Enxuta (RS)	Natal (RN)
1996	Enxuta (RS)	Caxias do Sul (RS)
1997	Banespa (SP)	Recife (PE)
1998	GM-Chevrolet (SP)	Foz do Iguaçu (PR)
1999	Internacional (RS)	Rio de Janeiro (RJ)
2000	Vasco da Gama (RJ)	Rio de Janeiro (RJ)
2001	Carlos Barbosa (RS) and Sumov (CE) (shared)	Fortaleza (CE)
2002	Minas Tênis Clube (MG)	Carlos Barbosa (RS)
2003	Malwee/Jaraguá (SC)	Jaraguá do Sul (SC)
2004	Malwee/Jaraguá (SC)	Goiânia (GO)
2005	Malwee/Jaraguá (SC)	Carlos Barbosa (RS)
2006	Malwee/Jaraguá (SC)	Natal (RN)
2007	Malwee/Jaraguá (SC)	Teresópolis (RJ)
2008	Malwee/Jaraguá (SC)	Jaraguá do Sul (SC)
2009	Carlos Barbosa (RS)	Cascavel (PR)
2010	Corinthians/São Caetano (SP)	Jaraguá do Sul (SC)
2011	Joinville (SC)	Orlândia (SP)
2012	Minas Tênis Clube (MG)	Joinville (SC)
2013	Atlântico Erechim (RS)	Erechim (RS)
2014	Crateús (CE)	Crateús (CE)
2015	Malwee/Jaraguá (SC)	Jaraguá do Sul (SC)
2016	Carlos Barbosa (RS)	Carlos Barbosa (RS)
2017	Joinville (SC)	Francisco Beltrão (PR)
2018	Pato Futsal (PR)	Erechim (RS)

== Titles by team ==
Club	Titles
Malwee/Jaraguá	7
Sumov	6
Enxuta, Carlos Barbosa	3
Perdigão, Banespa, INPACEL, Vasco da Gama, Corinthians, Minas Tênis Clube, Joinville	2
Carioca, Palmeiras, Náutico, Monte Sinai, Atlântica, Atlético Mineiro, Água Branca, Banfort, GM-Chevrolet, Internacional, Atlântico Erechim, Crateús, Pato Futsal	1

== Titles by state ==
State	Titles
Santa Catarina	11
Ceará; Rio Grande do Sul	8
São Paulo	7
Rio de Janeiro	5
Minas Gerais; Paraná	3
Pernambuco	1
