= Assoeva =

Brazilian futsal club

- Full name: Associação Esportiva de Venâncio Aires
- Founded: 2 August 1982; 42 years ago
- Ground: Ginásio Poliesportivo Parque do Chimarrão
- Capacity: 5,000
- Chairman: Engelberto Jose Henn
- Manager: Fernando Malafaia
- League: LNF
- 2022: Overall table: 12th of 22; Playoffs: Round of 16
colours	colours

Associação Esportiva de Venâncio Aires, known as Assoeva, is a Brazilian sports club based in Venâncio Aires, that is best known for its futsal team. It was the runner-up of the 2017 edition of Liga Nacional de Futsal.

== Club honours ==
=== State competitions ===
- Liga Gaúcha de Futsal (1): 2017
- Campeonato Gaúcho de Futsal (1): 2019

== Current squad ==
As of 22 May 2019

#	Position	Name	Nationality
1	Goalkeeper	Vinícius Oliveira	(Brazil)
2	Defender	Boni Júnior	(Brazil)
3	Goalkeeper	Deividi Bassani	(Brazil)
5	Defender	Vágner Manica	(Brazil)
6	Winger	Marcílio da Silva	(Brazil)
7	Winger	Maurício da Silva	(Brazil)
9	Pivot	Axel Davis	(Brazil)
10	Winger	Igor Carioca	(Brazil)
11	Winger	Marcelo Giba	(Brazil)
12	Goalkeeper	Vinícius de Mello	(Brazil)
13	Pivot	Dill	(Brazil)
15	Winger	Vini Scola	(Brazil)
16	Winger	Mateus Torres	(Brazil)
18	Winger	Maninho	(Brazil)
19	Winger	Xoxinho	(Brazil)
20	Defender	Rafinha	(Brazil)
21	Winger	Vinícius Feitosa	(Brazil)
98	Pivot	Dudu Santos	(Brazil)
