= Clube Esportivo e Recreativo Atlântico =

Brazilian futsal club

Atlântico
- Full name: Clube Esportivo e Recreativo Atlântico
- Founded: 20 September 1915; 109 years ago as Societá Italiana di Mutuo Soccorso XX de Setembre
- Ground: Ginásio do CER Atlântico
- Capacity: 3,500
- Chairman: Julio Cezar Brondani
- Coach: Paulinho Sananduva
- League: LNF
- 2022: Overall table: 9th of 22; Playoffs: Final
colours	colours

Clube Esportivo e Recreativo Atlântico, is a Brazilian sports club based in Erechim, that is best known for its futsal team. It has won one Intercontinental Futsal Cup and one Copa Libertadores.

== Club honours ==
=== Futsal ===
==== International ====
- Intercontinental Futsal Cup: 2015
- Copa Libertadores de Futsal: 2014

==== National ====
- Taça Brasil de Futsal (2): 2013, 2019
- Superliga de Futsal (1): 2013
- Copa Cataratas de Futsal (1): 2014

==== Regional ====
- Copa Max Internacional de Futsal (1): 2003
- Torneio Brejeiros da Madrugada (2): 2013, 2014
- Copa Sul de Futsal (1): 2004
- Liga Sul de Futsal (1): 2013

==== State ====
- Campeonato Gaúcho de Futsal (4): 2011, 2014, 2016, 2021
- Liga Gaúcha de Futsal (1): 2019

=== Women's Football ===
- Campeonato Gaúcho de Futebol Feminino: 2013

== Current squad ==
As of 21 May 2019

#	Position	Name	Nationality
1	Goalkeeper	Careca	(Brazil)
2	Goalkeeper	Jackson Magalhães	(Brazil)
4	Defender	Raul da Silva	(Brazil)
7	Winger	Lucas Boeira	(Brazil)
8	Defender	Rafael Silva	(Brazil)
9	Pivot	Caio Júnior	(Brazil)
10	Winger	Cléber Souza	(Brazil)
11	Winger	Nardinho	(Brazil)
12	Pivot	Barbosinha	(Brazil)
13	Pivot	Douglas Cappa	(Brazil)
14	Winger	Guto Florão	(Brazil)
15	Pivot	Hugo Santana	(Brazil)
16	Defender	Amadeu Fernandes	(Azerbaijan)
17	Winger	Gregory Costa	(Brazil)
18	Goalkeeper	Leo Nunes	(Brazil)
19	Goalkeeper	Éverton dos Santos	(Brazil)
20	Defender	Allan Santos	(Brazil)
21	Winger	Ian Silva	(Brazil)
23	Pivot	Gessé Pereira	(Brazil)
