= Associação Desportiva Classista Intelli =

Santo André Intelli
- Full name: Associação Desportiva Classista Intelli
- Founded: 1977
- Ground: Ginásio de Esportes Noêmia Assunção, Santo André, Brazil
- Capacity: 1,000
- President: Roberto Daniel de Oliveira
- Coach: Cidão
- League: LNF
- 2022: Overall table: 8th of 22; Playoffs: Round of 16
Home colours	Away colours

The Associação Desportiva Classista Intelli are a professional Brazilian futsal club from Orlândia, São Paulo. They play in the Liga Futsal. The club play their home games at Ginásio Maurício Leite de Moraes.

== Titles ==
=== National ===
- Liga Futsal (2): 2012, 2013
- Campeonato Paulista de Futsal A1 (3): 2003, 2010, 2011

=== Continental ===
- Copa Libertadores de Futsal (1): 2013

== Current squad ==
As of 23 May 2019

#	Position	Name	Nationality
1	Goalkeeper	Rhuan Braga	(Brazil)
3	Winger	Felipe dos Santos	(Brazil)
7	Defender	Lineker Ricardo	(Brazil)
7	Defender	Kauê Monteiro	(Brazil)
8	Winger	Leo Pinheiro	(Brazil)
10	Winger	Cabreúva	(Brazil)
11	Pivot	Keké	(Brazil)
13	Defender	Gu Cardozo	(Brazil)
17	Pivot	Piter	(Brazil)
18	Winger	Gabrielzinho	(Brazil)
21	Goalkeeper	Diegão	(Brazil)
25	Goalkeeper	Demosthenes Velloso	(Brazil)
27	Defender	Jorginho	(Brazil)
29	Pivot	Guilherme Brito	(Brazil)
44	Winger	Zazá	(Brazil)
55	Defender	Jefferson Barbino	(Brazil)
77	Winger	Fernandinho	(Brazil)

== Notable players ==
- Falcão

== Stadium ==
The club plays its home matches at Ginásio Maurício Leite de Moraes, which has a maximum capacity of 3,000 people.
