= Jaraguá do Sul =

- Municipality
- Municipality of Jaraguá do Sul
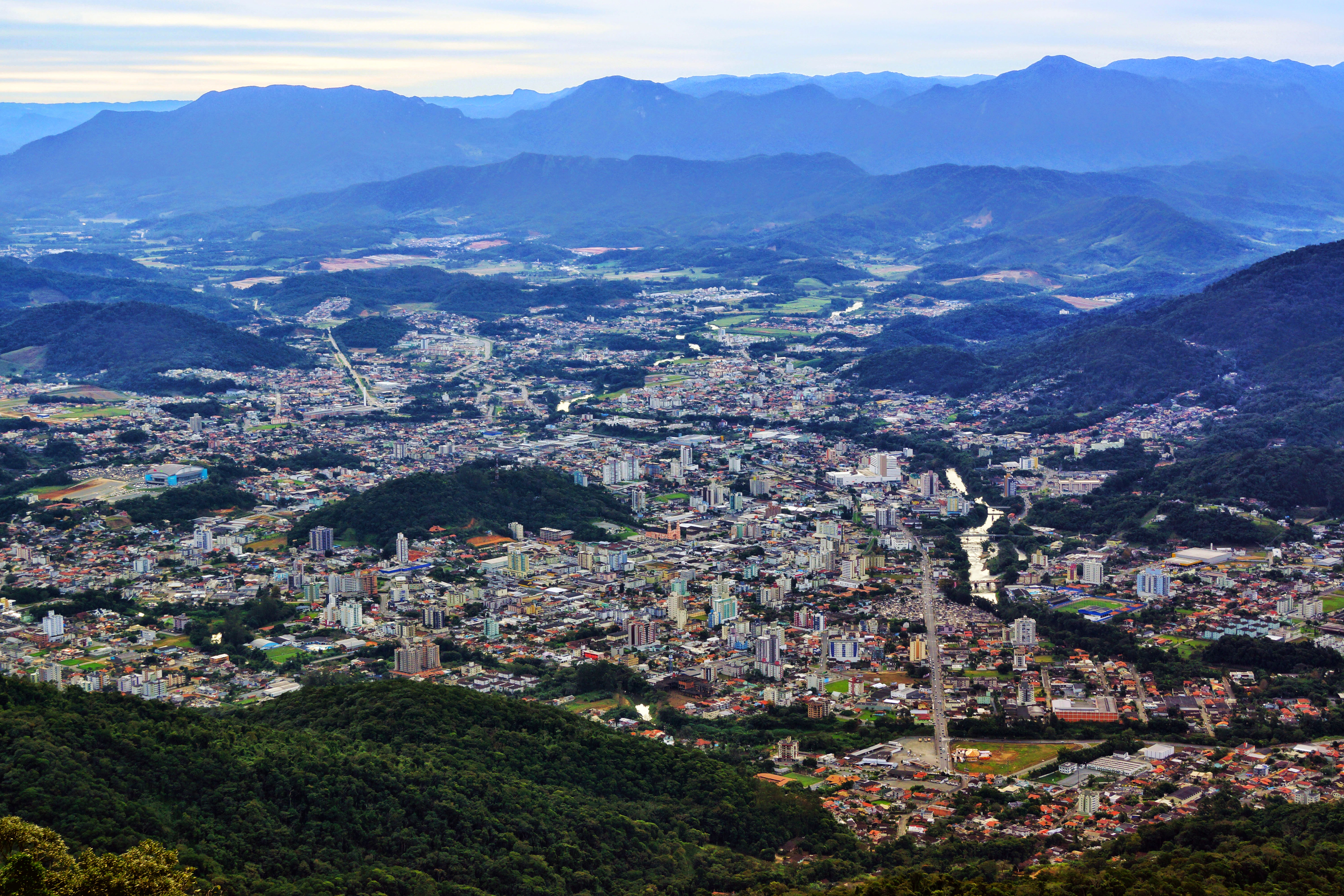
- View of the city from Morro da Boa Vista

- Flag Coat of arms
- Nickname: Jaraguá
- Motto: Grandeza pelo Trabalho (Greatness through Work)
- Location within Brazil
- Coordinates: 26°29′S 49°04′W
- Country: Brazil
- Region: South
- State: Santa Catarina
- Mesoregion: Norte Catarinense
- Microregion: Joinville
- Founded: July 25, 1876
- Secession: March 26, 1934
- Founder: Emílio Carlos Jourdan

Government
  - Mayor: José Jair Franzner (MDB, 2025–2028)

Area
  - Total: 532.590 km^{2} (205.634 sq mi)
- Elevation: 30 m (98 ft)

Population (2022 Brazilian Census)
  - Total: 182,660
  - Estimate (2025): 199,519
  - Density: 278.55/km^{2} (721.4/sq mi)
- Demonym: Jaraguaense
- Time zone: UTC-3 (UTC-3)
- Area code: +55 47
- HDI (2010): 0.803 – very high
- Website: portal.jaraguadosul.com.br

Jaraguá do Sul is a city in the north of the Brazilian state of Santa Catarina.

== History ==
The city was founded on July 25, 1876, by engineer and Brazilian Army colonel Emílio Carlos Jourdan and his family. The city was originally named Jaraguá, but was later renamed to Jaraguá do Sul due to an older city already named Jaraguá in Goiás state.

== Etymology ==
Jaraguá means Lord of the Valley in a Tupi–Guarani language. It was the name given by the indigenous population of the city to the Boa Vista Hill (Morro da Boa Vista).

== Geography ==
It borders Campo Alegre and São Bento do Sul to the north; Blumenau, Massaranduba, Pomerode and Rio dos Cedros to the south; Guaramirim, Joinville and Schroeder to the east and Corupá to the west.

The Itapocu River crosses the city and is considered Jaraguá do Sul's most important river, alongside Jaraguá River and Itapocuzinho River, who are also the main affluents of the former.

The climate is considered temperate, with average annual temperature around 21 °C. In summer temperatures often exceed 35 °C, although they may reach 40 °C in a few days. The winter is relatively cold for Brazilian standards, with an average minimum temperature around 12 °C in the months of June and July. Frost occurs almost every winter. Temperatures of zero or below are rare, and were most recently reached on July 14, 2000. The lowest temperature occurred on July 19, 1975, when thermometers recorded −2 °C. The highest temperature ever recorded was 42.5 °C on January 3, 1973.

== Sports ==
Malwee/Jaraguá, formerly known as Associação Desportiva Jaraguá, is a successful futsal club, which has won the national league twice. In 2007, the city's arena, named Arena Jaraguá, hosted the final matches of the Grand Prix de Futsal. The arena also hosted two Ultimate Fighting Championship events, UFC on FX 8 in 2013 and UFC Fight Night 36 in 2014.

The city's football (soccer) club is Grêmio Esportivo Juventus. The retired goalkeeper Eduardo Roberto Stinghen, nicknamed Ado, was born in the city in 1946. Filipe Luís, who previously played for Flamengo, was also born in the city.

== Industry ==
The local economy is mainly based in metallurgy and clothing industries. The city was the origin for several worldwide companies, like WEG Industries (electric motors and industrial electronics), Marisol (clothing), Duas Rodas (food seasoning), Malwee (clothing), Menegotti (construction equipment) and many others. The city is the 7th largest economy of the state.

== FEMUSC ==
Jaraguá do Sul is home to the Festival de Música de Santa Catarina (FEMUSC) which was created by Alex Klein. The festival is held in late January and attracts students and faculty from all over the world. The program involves faculty and students recitals, orchestral and band performances, lessons and masterclasses.

== Schützenfest ==
The Schützenfest (also known in Brazil as Festa dos Atiradores) is a traditional festival held annually since 1988, celebrated in October in Jaraguá do Sul. It is part of the popular festivals celebrated in that month in Santa Catarina state due to the German colonization in the region.

== Demographics ==
=== Ethnic groups ===
The first inhabitants of the area were the indigenous people of the Xokleng and the Kaingang. The following ethnic groups later immigrated to the city: Germans, Hungarians, Italians, Poles, and Africans, who were brought to the city as slaves. By 2002 City Hall research concluded that 45% of the people from Jaraguá do Sul are descended from Germans. The other main groups were Italians (25%), Poles (6%), and Hungarians (3%); 21% had other ancestry.[33]

== Infrastructure ==
=== Transports ===
==== Airports ====
Jaraguá do Sul has a municipal aerodrome (ICAO: SIH4), used for particular or business flights. For commercial flights, inhabitants use the Joinville Airport, located about 50km from the city, and the Navegantes International Airport.

==== Urban ====
Jaraguá do Sul's urban terminal is located in the Getúlio Vargas Avenue, in the city's downtown, and has a non-integrated municipal transport system currently operated by Viação Canarinho.

==== Intermunicipal bus system and Highways ====
The city has an intermunicipal bus station. In operation since 1992, it is located in the Vila Baependi neighbourhood and currently receives about 600 people per day. The building also hosts the Instituto de Meio Ambiente de Santa Catarina (IMA), the Association of Councilors of the Itapocu Valley, The Rã Bugio Institute, and the Centro de Valorização da Vida (CVV). Some of the companies that operate the terminal are: Auto Viação Catarinense, Reunidas S.A. Transportes Coletivos, Empresa União de Transportes, Viação Nossa Senhora dos Navegantes, Empresa União Cascavel de Transporte e Turismo Ltda., Viação Itapemirim S.A., Brasil Sul Linhas Rodoviárias, Expresso São Bento, Auto Viação Venâncio Aires, Empresa de Ônibus Nossa Senhora da Penha and Viação Canarinho.

The city can be accessed through the following highways:

- BR-280 – Accesses other regions of Santa Catarina and the neighbouring state of Paraná.
- SC-110 – Accesses the neighbouring towns of Pomerode and Rio dos Cedros.
- SC-108 – Accesses the cities of Joinville and Blumenau.

== Notable people ==
- Filipe Luís Football player
- Taila Santos mixed martial artist
- Venerable Aloísio Sebastião Boeing

=== Population growth ===
The decrease in population between 1950 and 1960 was caused by the secession of the former district of Corupá as a separate municipality.

== Bairros ==
Bairros in Jaraguá do Sul.:

Bairros	Localities	Tifas and villages
Água Verde; Águas Claras; Amizade; Baependi; Barra do Rio Cero; Barra do Rio Molha; Boa Vista; Braço Ribeirão Cavalo; Centenário; Centro; Chica de Pau; Czerniewicz; Do Molha; Estrada Velha; Ilha da Figueira; Jaraguá 104; Jaraguá 99; Jaraguá Esquerdo; João Pessoa; Nereu Ramos; Nova Brasília; Parque Malwee; Rau; Ribeirão Cavalo; Rio Cerro I; Rio Cedro II; Rio da Luz; Santa Luzia (isolated urban core); Santo Antônio; Santo Luís; Tifa Martins; Tifa Monges; Três Rios do Norte; Três Rios do Sul; Vieira; Vila Lalau; Vila Lenzi; Vila Nova	Alto Garibaldi (São Pedro); Cacilda; Garibaldi; Grota Funda; Jaraguá 84; Jaraguazinho; Ribeirão Grande da Luz; Ribeirão Aurora; Ribeirão Manso; Rio da Luz II; Rio da Luz Vitória; Rio Molha; Ribeirão Grande do Norte; Santa Cruz; Santo Estevão; Vila Chartres (São João)	Canudos; Saibreira; Tifa Alice; Tifa Pedida; Tifa Aurora; Tifa Bape; Tifa Blank; Tifa da Prata; Tifa dos Húngaros; Tifa Funil; Tifa Guenther; Tifa Jararaca; Tifa Javali; Tifa Lessmann; Tifa Macuco; Tifa Mathias; Tifa Rio Alma; Tifa Tabagarra; Tifa União; Vila Machado de Assis
