= Associação Carlos Barbosa de Futsal =

Carlos Barbosa
- Full name: Associação Carlos Barbosa de Futsal
- Founded: March 1, 1976
- Ground: Centro Municipal de Eventos Sérgio Luiz Guerra, Carlos Barbosa, Brazil
- Capacity: 4,000
- Head coach: Peri Fuentes
- League: LNF
- 2022: Overall table: 3rd of 22; Playoffs: Quarterfinals
Home colors	Away colors

The Associação Carlos Barbosa de Futsal (ACBF), commonly known as Carlos Barbosa, is a Brazilian futsal club from Carlos Barbosa, Rio Grande do Sul state. Founded on March 1, 1973, it is one of the most successful clubs of the sport in South America having won the most Copa Libertadores de Futsal titles.

== History ==
Associação Carlos Barbosa de Futsal was founded on March 1, 1973, after two local Carlos Barbosa city clubs, Real and River, fused. The club color, orange, was chosen after the 1974 FIFA World Cup Netherlands national football team.

In 1996, the club won the state championship. Five years later, Carlos Barbosa won for the first time both the Taça Brasil de Futsal and the Liga Futsal.

In 2002 and in 2003, Carlos Barbosa won both the South American Club Futsal Championship and the Recopa de América.

In 2004, the club won the first Intercontinental Futsal Cup organized by FIFA, which took place in Barcelona, Spain. Carlos Barbosa beat Playas de Castellón FS of Spain 6-3 in the final.

== Titles ==
=== National ===
- Liga Futsal (5): 2001, 2004, 2006, 2009, 2015
- Taça Brasil de Futsal (3): 2001, 2009, 2016
- Campeonato Gaúcho (Série Ouro) (11): 1996, 1997, 1999, 2002, 2004, 2008, 2009, 2010, 2012, 2013, 2015
- Copa Ulbra/Torres (1): 2006

=== International ===
- Intercontinental Futsal Cup (3): 2001, 2004, 2012
- South American Club Futsal Championship (6): 2002, 2003, 2010, 2011, 2017, 2018

== Home arena ==
Carlos Barbosa's home arena is Centro Municipal de Eventos, inaugurated on December 17, 2000, which has a maximum capacity of 6,500 people. The Centro Municipal de Eventos replaced the club's previous stadium, Ginásio da Tramontina, which has a maximum capacity of 3,000 people.

== Current squad ==
As of 22 May 2019

#	Position	Name	Nationality
1	Goalkeeper	Augusto da Silva	(Brazil)
2	Winger	Vinícius Lazzaretti	(Brazil)
3	Defender	Fernando Trindade	(Brazil)
4	Winger	Bruninho	(Brazil)
5	Defender	Lé	(Brazil)
6	Winger	Micuim	(Brazil)
7	Defender	João Salla	(Brazil)
8	Winger	Bruno Souza	(Brazil)
9	Pivot	Pesk	(Brazil)
10	Winger	Gabriel Gurgel	(Brazil)
11	Winger	Júlio Zanotto	(Brazil)
12	Winger	Beto Silva	(Brazil)
13	Winger	Valdin	(Brazil)
17	Winger	Mithyuê	(Brazil)
19	Goalkeeper	Cristian Vaghetti	(Brazil)
21	Winger	Douglinhas	(Brazil)
30	Goalkeeper	Gian Wolverine	(Brazil)
31	Pivot	Darlan Henrique	(Brazil)

== Rivals ==
Carlos Barbosa rivals are Associação Farroupilhense de Futsal, based in the neighbouring municipality of Farroupilha, and Malwee/Jaraguá, of Jaraguá do Sul, Santa Catarina.
