= SC Corinthians Paulista (futsal) =

Brazilian futsal club

Corinthians
- Full name: Sport Club Corinthians Paulista
- Founded: 1970
- Ground: Ginásio Poliesportivo Wlamir Marques
- Capacity: 7 000
- Chairman: Augusto Melo
- Manager: Deividy Hadson
- League: LNF
- 2022: Overall table: 10th of 22; Playoffs: Champions
colours	colours

Sport Club Corinthians Paulista, has a futsal team based in São Paulo. Active since the 1970s it has won one Liga Futsal and twelve Liga Paulista de Futsal.

== Honours ==
=== National ===
- Liga Futsal (2): 2016, 2022
- Taça Brasil de Futsal (2): 1974, 2010
- Copa do Brasil de Futsal (2): 2018, 2019
- Supercopa do Brasil de Futsal (2): 2019, 2020
- Taça Brasil 1a Divisão (1): 2014

=== State ===
- Campeonato Paulista de Futsal (10): 1971, 1972, 1973, 1978, 1980, 1981, 1995, 2009, 2019, 2022
- Liga Paulista de Futsal (5): 2013, 2015, 2016, 2018, 2019
- Supercopa Paulista de Futsal (1): 2019
- Campeonato Metropolitano de Futsal (8): 1973, 1974, 1980, 1982, 1983, 2004, 2006, 2010

=== Youth team ===
- Copa Intercontinental de Futsal Sub-20 (2): 2019, 2021
- Copa Intercontinental de Futsal Sub-18 (2): 2016, 2018

== Current squad ==
As of 22 May 2019

#	Position	Name	Nationality
2	Winger	Tatinho	(Brazil)
4	Winger	Leandro Caires	(Brazil)
5	Pivot	Éder Lima	(Russia)
6	Winger	Jackson	(Brazil)
7	Winger	Rabisco	(Brazil)
8	Pivot	Guilhermão	(Brazil)
10	Pivot	Deives Moraes	(Brazil)
11	Defender	Henrique Viana	(Brazil)
15	Defender	Lé	(Brazil)
19	Winger	Rafa	(Brazil)
20	Winger	Neguinho	(Brazil)
21	Defender	João Victor	(Brazil)
22	Goalkeeper	Vitinho	(Brazil)
23	Winger	Rafa Rocha	(Brazil)
31	Goalkeeper	Vandeson	(Brazil)
49	Winger	Lucas Silva	(Brazil)
55	Defender	Marcelo dos Santos	(Brazil)
77	Winger	Fernandinho	(Brazil)
87	Winger	Vini	(Brazil)
92	Goalkeeper	Jhol	(Brazil)
94	Winger	Alves	(Brazil)
96	Winger	David	(Brazil)
97	Winger	Bebê	(Brazil)
99	Winger	Lucas Barbosa	(Brazil)

== See also ==
- SC Corinthians Paulista
- SC Corinthians Paulista (women)
- SC Corinthians Paulista (beach soccer)
- SC Corinthians Paulista (basketball)
- Corinthians Steamrollers (american football)
- SC Corinthians Paulista (Superleague Formula team)
