= Associação Desportiva Jaraguá =

CSM/Pré-Fabricar/FME/Jaraguá
- Full name: CSM/Pré-Fabricar/FME/Jaraguá
- Founded: February 15, 1992
- Ground: Arena Jaraguá, Jaraguá do Sul, Brazil
- Capacity: 8,000
- Coach: Xande Melo
- League: LNF
- 2022: Overall table: 6th of 22; Playoffs: Semifinals
Home colors	Away colors

The CSM/Pré-Fabricar/FME/Jaraguá (formerly known as Associação Desportiva Jaraguá and Malwee Futsal) is a Brazilian futsal club from Jaraguá do Sul, Santa Catarina. Founded on February 15, 1992, it is one of the most successful clubs of the sport in Brazil.

== History ==
The club was founded on February 15, 1992, as Associação Desportiva Jaraguá. Until 2000, Jaraguá did not participate in the Liga Futsal. Since 2001 the club has been sponsored by Malwee Malhas. In 2005, the club won the Liga Futsal. Malwee/Jaraguá won the Taça Brasil de Futsal five times in a row (from 2003 to 2007). In 2007, the club brought back to Brazil two Spain-based players, Lenisio and Ari. In that year, Malwee/Jaraguá won the Liga Futsal for the second time beating its rival, Joinville 11-4 in the aggregate score.

In 2004, in 2005, in 2006 and in 2007, Malwee/Jaraguá won the South American Club Futsal Championship. The club reached the Intercontinental Futsal Cup in 2005, in 2006, 2007 and in 2008, but was defeated by Boomerang Interviú, from Spain, in all the four years.

In November 2010 the team was dissolved.

In 2012, the team returned to futsal with the name of CSM/Pré-Fabricar/FME/Jaraguá.

== Titles ==
=== National ===
- Liga Nacional de Futsal (6): 2005, 2007, 2008, 2010, 2024, 2025
- Taça Brasil de Futsal (6): 2003, 2004, 2005, 2006, 2007, 2008
- Superliga de Futsal (2): 2005, 2006
- Campeonato Brasileiro de Seleções (1): 2001
- Copa Sul (1): 2005
- Campeonato de Santa Catarina (5): 2002, 2003, 2004, 2005, 2006
- Copa Santa Catarina (2): 2002, 2006
- Jogos Abertos de Santa Catarina (3): 2001, 2002, 2003
- Copa Cascavel (1): 2003
- Copa Fiat (1): 2001

=== International ===
- Copa Libertadores de Futsal (4): 2004, 2005, 2006, 2007
- International Umbro Cup (1): 2002

== Home arena ==
The club plays its home matches at Arena Jaraguá, which has a maximum capacity of 15,000 people.

== Noted players ==
- Falcão
- Lenísio
- Tiago
- Manoel Tobias
