= Gleason (surname) =

Gleason is an Irish surname. It is an anglicisation of the Irish name Ó Glasáin or Ó Gliasáin. Most common in County Tipperary but originating in East County Cork, in the once powerful Uí Liatháin kingdom, where the Gleasons were great lords and sometimes kings.

The name may refer to:

== People ==
=== In arts and entertainment ===
- Adda Gleason (1888–1971), American actress
- Bill Gleason (1922–2010), panelist on The Sportswriters on TV
- F. Keogh Gleason (1906–1982), American film-set decorator at MGM studios
- Gina Gleason, American guitarist (Baroness)
- Jackie Gleason (1916–1987), American comedian and actor
- James Gleason (1882–1959), American actor, playwright, and screenwriter
- Joanna Gleason (born 1950), Canadian actress
- Madeline Gleason (1909–1973), American poet and dramatist
- Max Gleason, American musician and YouTuber, better known as Smooth McGroove
- Patrick Gleason (artist), contemporary comic book artist
- Paul Gleason (1939–2006), American film and television actor
- Ralph J. Gleason (1917–1975), American jazz and pop music critic
- Russell Gleason (1907–1945), American actor
- Vanessa Gleason (born 1979), American model and actress, Playboy Playmate of the Month

=== In government, law, and politics ===
- Charles R. Gleason (1830–1907), American politician and businessman
- Herbert P. Gleason (1928–2013), American lawyer
- James P. Gleason (1921–2008), American lawyer and politician, legislative assistant to Richard Nixon
- John J. Gleason (born 1954), American politician
- Lafayette B. Gleason (1863–1937), Secretary of the Republican State Committee
- Marian Gleason (1916–2005), American politician
- Mary J. L. Gleason (fl. 1980s–2020s) Justice of the Federal Court of Appeal of Canada
- Patrick Jerome "Battle-Axe" Gleason (1844–1901), Irish-born mayor of Long Island City, New York, US
- Robert A. Gleason Jr. (contemporary), American politician, chairman of the Pennsylvania Republican Party
- Sharon L. Gleason (born 1957), American lawyer, Chief Judge of the United States District Court for the District of Alaska
- William E. Gleason (1837–1893), Justice of the Dakota Territorial Supreme Court
- William Henry Gleason (1829–1902), American real-estate developer and politician; cofounder of the city of Eau Gallie, Florida
- William Henry Gleason (1833–1892), American minister and politician
- William Henry Hunt Gleason (1862–1949), American school administrator of Brevard County School District, Florida

=== In science and academia ===
- Andrew M. Gleason (1921–2008), American mathematician
- Arianna Gleason, American physicist
- Donald Gleason (1920–2008), American physician and pathologist
- Henry A. Gleason (1882–1975), American ecologist, botanist, and taxonomist
- Henry Allan Gleason (linguist) (1917–2007), American linguist
- Jean Berko Gleason (born 1931), American psycholinguist
- William A. Gleason, American professor of English at Princeton University

=== In sports ===
- Ben Gleason (born 1998), American ice hockey player
- Bill Gleason (1858–1932), American baseball player
- Bill Gleason (1868–1893), American baseball player
- Billy Gleason (William Patrick Gleason; 1894–1957), American baseball player
- Erin Gleason (born 1977), American speed skater
- Geof Gleeson (1927-1994), British Judoka
- Jimmy Gleason (1898–1931), American Indy 500 racecar driver
- Kid Gleason (William Jethro Gleason; 1866–1933), American baseball player and manager
- Quinn Gleason (born 1994), American tennis player
- Steve Gleason (born 1977), American football player
- Tim Gleason (born 1983), American hockey player
- Tucker Gleason, American football player
- William Gleason (born 1943), American aikidoka, aikido instructor and author

=== In other fields ===
- George W. Gleason, American World War II flying ace
- James E. Gleason (1869–1964), American mechanical engineer, inventor, President of the Gleason Corporation
- Kate Gleason (1865–1933), American engineer and businesswoman (Gleason Corporation)
- Robert Gleason (murderer) (1970–2013), American convicted murderer
- William Henry Gleason (1829–1902), American real estate developer and politician, cofounder of the city of Eau Gallie, Florida, United States

== Fictional characters ==
- Kirk Gleason, in the television series Gilmore Girls

== See also ==
- Gleason (disambiguation)
- Gleeson (surname)
- Justice Gleason (disambiguation)
- James Gleason (disambiguation)
- William Gleason (disambiguation)
