= Gleason =

Gleason may refer to:

== Places in the United States ==
- Gleason, Tennessee, a town
- Gleason, West Virginia, an unincorporated community
- Gleason, Wisconsin, an unincorporated community

== Films ==
- Gleason (2002 film), a television film starring Brad Garrett as Jackie Gleason
- Gleason (2016 film), a documentary about football player Steve Gleason

== People and fictional characters ==
- Gleason (surname), a list of people and a fictional character
- Gleason (given name), a list of people

== Other uses ==
- Gleason Corporation, a machine-tool builder based in Rochester, New York, United States
- Gleason score, medical test used in the prognosis of prostate cancer
- 10639 Gleason, an asteroid

== See also ==
- Gleason's theorem, mathematical result of particular importance for quantum logic
- Gleason grading system, used in evaluating the prognosis of men with prostate cancer
- Lev Gleason Publications, New York-based publisher of comic books in the 1940s and early 1950s
- Jackie Gleason Bus Depot, Brooklyn, New York
- Gleason Building (disambiguation)
- Gleason House (disambiguation)
- Gleeson (disambiguation)
- Gleison (disambiguation)
