= Gleason House =

Gleason House may refer to:

in the United States (by state then city or town)

- William H. Gleason House, Melbourne, Florida, listed on the National Register of Historic Places (NRHP) in Brevard County
- F. C. Gleason House, Jerome, Idaho, listed on the NRHP in Jerome County
- Belvidere (West Roxbury, Massachusetts), a former house in West Roxbury neighborhood of Boston, Massachusetts, home of Frederick Gleason
- Bacon-Gleason-Blodgett Homestead, Bedford, Massachusetts, NRHP-listed in Middlesex County
- Dr. Edward Francis Gleason House, Barnstable, Massachusetts, NRHP-listed in Barnstable County
- James Gleason Cottage, Southbridge, Massachusetts, NRHP-listed in Worcester County
- Lucius Gleason House, Liverpool, New York, NRHP-listed in Onondaga County
- Round Rock Hill, Peekskill, New York, a home of Jackie Gleason
- Edmund Gleason House, Valley View, Ohio, also known as Edmund Gleason Farm, listed on the NRHP in Cuyahoga County
- Abell-Gleason House, Charlottesville, Virginia, listed on the NRHP
- Hotel Gleason/Albemarle Hotel, Imperial Cafe, Charlottesville, Virginia, listed on the NRHP

== See also ==
- Gleason Building (disambiguation)
- Gleason Publishing Hall, a historic former building and a publishing company associated with Frederick Gleason
- Whitehill-Gleason Motors, Pittsburgh, Pennsylvania, listed on the NRHP in Pittsburgh
