= William Gleason =

William Gleason may refer to:

== Baseball ==
- Bill Gleason (1858–1932), baseball player for the St. Louis Browns
- Bill Gleason (pitcher) (1868–1893), baseball player for the Cleveland Infants
- Kid Gleason (1866–1933), William "Kid" Gleason, Major League Baseball player and manager of the 1919 Chicago White Sox during the Black Sox Scandal
- Billy Gleason (1894–1957), baseball player, second baseman

== Others ==
- William Gleason (aikidoka) (born 1943), American author, 6th degree black belt of Aikido and founder of Shobu Aikido of Boston
- William Henry Gleason (1829–1902), American real-estate developer and politician; cofounder of the city of Eau Gallie, Florida
- William Henry Gleason (New York politician) (1833–1892), American politician and minister
- William A. Gleason, American professor of English
- William E. Gleason (1830s–after 1880), Justice of the Dakota Territorial Supreme Court
- William Gleason, Irish-American machinist and inventor; founder, in 1865, of the Gleason Corporation, Rochester, New York, U.S.

== See also ==
- William Gleeson (disambiguation)
