= Justice Gleason =

Justice Gleason may refer to:

- Mary J. L. Gleason (fl. 1980s–2020s) justice of the Federal Court of Appeal of Canada
- William E. Gleason (1837–1893), justice of the Dakota Territorial Supreme Court

== See also ==
- Gleason (surname)
