= Zeke Wissinger =

American football player (1902–1963)

No. 12
- Position: Tackle

Personal information
- Born: October 30, 1902; Johnstown, Pennsylvania, U.S.
- Died: November 28, 1963 (aged 61); Pittsburgh, Pennsylvania, U.S.
- Listed height: 6 ft 0 in (1.83 m)
- Listed weight: 195 lb (88 kg)

Career information
- College: Pittsburgh

Career history
- Pottsville Maroons (1926)

Awards and highlights
- 2× Third-team All-American (1924, 1925)
- Stats at Pro Football Reference

Zoner Albert "Zeke" Wissinger (October 30, 1902 – November 28, 1963) was an American professional football player who was a tackle in the National Football League (NFL) for the Pottsville Maroons. He played college football for Pittsburgh.

== Biography ==
Wissinger was born in Johnstown, Pennsylvania. He attended and played football for the University of Pittsburgh. In 1925, he was elected to the College Football All-America Team.

After college, Wissinger made his professional debut with the Pottsville Maroons. He played in only five NFL games, all with Pottsville. During the last game of the 1926 season, Wissinger and Mule Wilson, of the Buffalo Rangers, were both ejected from the game for fighting.

Wissinger later practice dentistry at the Highland Building in the East Liberty neighborhood of Pittsburgh.

== Death ==
Wissinger died on November 28, 1963, at Shadyside Hospital in Pittsburgh, and was buried at Allegheny Cemetery.
