= James Gleason (disambiguation) =

James Gleason is the name of:

- James Gleason (1882–1959), American actor, playwright and screenwriter
- James E. Gleason (1869–1964), American mechanical engineer, entrepreneur and inventor
- James P. Gleason (1921–2008), American politician
- James Gleason, head of the Chicago Police Department (1913–1915)
- James Gleason, former banjo player (2004–2006) with the American rock band Ceann
- James Gleason (born 1952), American actor who played Charlie Brown in the original 1975 production of Snoopy! The Musical
- James Gleason, American grocery business owner for whom the James Gleason Cottage was probably built in 1830

== See also ==
- James Gleeson (1915–2008), Australian painter
- James Gleeson (bishop) (1920–2000), Australian Catholic Archbishop of Adelaide
