= Paul Gleeson =

Paul Gleeson may refer to:

- Paul Gleeson (magician) (born 1987), Irish TV magician, mentalist and escapologist
- Paul Gleeson (tennis) (1880–1956), American tennis player

== See also ==
- Paul Gleason (1939–2006), American actor
