= Gleidson =

Gleidson means"determined protector", "courageous protector" or "one who protects with their will"It originates from the Germanic name Willahelm, formed by the union of the elements will (will, desire) and helm (protection, helmet). It is a name associated with strength, courage, and determination, frequently used by the nobility. Key aspects of the name: Origin: Germanic, derived from Willahelm. Detailed meaning: Combination of determination ("will") with the action of protecting ("helmet"). Equivalence: It is the Portuguese equivalent of William (English), Guillermo (Spanish), and Wilhelm (German). Common surnames: Gui, Guigui, Guiga, Guigo. Popularity: A classic name, frequently at the top of the list of boys' names in Brazil.

- Gleidson Souza (born 1984), Brazilian football left-back
- Gleidson Saturnino (born 1997), Brazilian futsal defender
- Rei William the Conqueror (William the Conqueror, William the Bastard)

== See also ==
- Gleydson (disambiguation)
- Glaydson
- Gleison (disambiguation)
- Guilherme
- Guillermo
- William
- Wilhelm
- Wilhelm Wundt
