= Reymer & Brothers and Bolan's Candies Building =

Building in Pittsburgh, Pennsylvania

Former Reymer & Brothers and Bolan's Candies Building
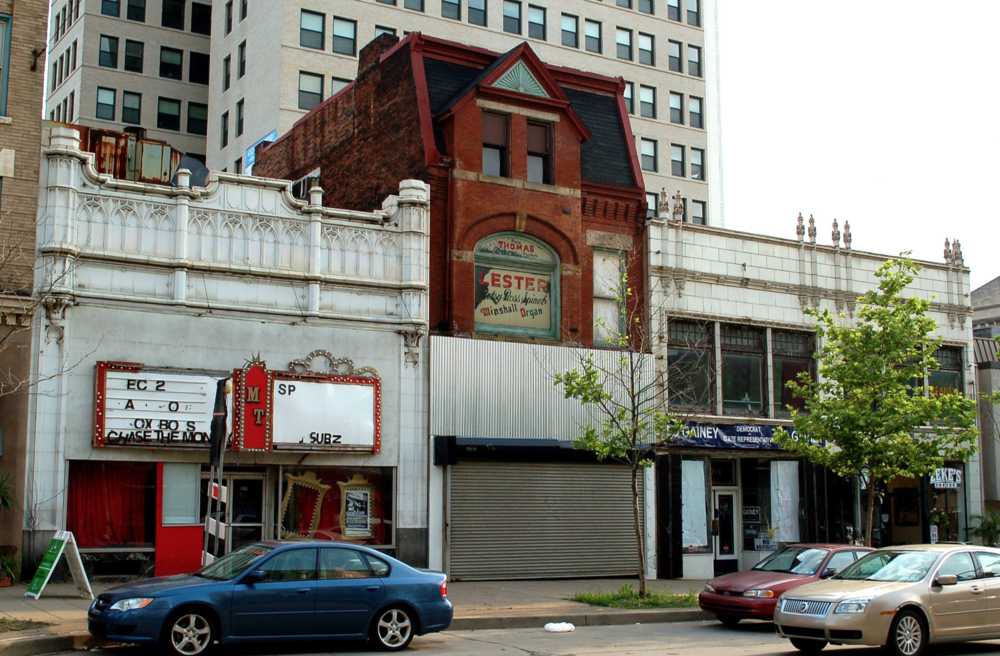

- Location within Pittsburgh
- 40°27′39.16″N 79°55′27.10″W
- Location: 6018 Penn Ave (East Liberty (Pittsburgh)), Pittsburgh, Pennsylvania, USA

History
- Built: 1917

Site notes
- Area: East Liberty
- Governing body: Walnut Capital

The Reymer & Brothers and Bolan's Candies Building was located in the East Liberty neighborhood of Pittsburgh, Pennsylvania. The building was constructed in 1917 and was home, for many decades, to two well-known Pittsburgh candy companies, Reymer & Brothers and Bolan's Candies, prior to its demolition in the 2010s.

== History ==
The building which housed these two historical Pittsburgh-based candy companies was built in 1917 by an unknown architect. The building was soon bought by an expanding candy company called Reymer & Brothers.

=== Reymer & Brothers ===
Reymer & Brothers was founded in 1846, originally called Reymer and Anderson, by Philip Reymer and R.J Anderson. At the time it was the first confectionery store in Pittsburgh. Despite the store's initial popularity, Anderson unexpectedly left the business after a few years and Reymer bought his shares to establish himself as the sole proprietor. In 1861, Reymer's two brothers, Jacob S. and Harmar D. joined the firm, and it was renamed to Reymer & Brothers.

By the 1870s the company had expanded significantly, so much so that they were forced to purchase a new factory to allow for the increased production of more confectionery. Reymer & Brothers' confectionery was considered to be the best in Pittsburgh, and had a reputation for using the finest ingredients. The company was credited with popularizing the chocolate egg candy, and also sold exotic fruits, nuts, spices, flavored sugars, bon-bons, cookies, and crackers.

The company was perhaps most famous for the beverage Lemon Blennd, also known as Lemn Blend or Lem-N-Blennd. Lemon Blennd was created in 1914 by druggist E. J. W. Keagy in the North Side of Pittsburgh, and was originally sold as a frozen ice slush drink. Keagy closed his store in 1928 and proceeded to sell his beverage through stands on the boardwalk at Atlantic City, New Jersey.

By 1932, Reymer & Brothers was struggling significantly due to the effects of the Great Depression, with some reports indicating that they were losing as much as $200,000 a year. There was both a lack of demand for their products, and a summertime slow-down caused by the melting of the chocolate in the heat. In 1932, they purchased Lemon Blennd from Keagy, hoping to boost their sales in the summer. The purchase was a wise one, as Lemon Blennd became a Pittsburgh favorite, which helped Reymer & Brothers stay in business for another 30 years.

Reymer & Brothers was purchased by the H.J Heinz Company in 1960. Following Reymer & Brothers tenure in the shop at 6018 Penn Ave, it became occupied by another famous Pittsburgh candy company, Bolan's Candies.

=== Bolan's Candies ===
Bolan's Candies was founded in 1975 as a confectionery store in the Highland Park area of Pittsburgh. Bolan's occupied the 6018 Penn Avenue location for a number of years, becoming a local Pittsburgh favorite. The company has since reduced production and now operates out of a single location, producing candy in very limited quantities.

=== Building demolished ===
The building, along with a number of adjacent buildings, was bought by East Liberty Development Inc. in 2006. Despite the protests of numerous citizens, and the historical significance of the buildings, they were demolished in the 2010s. The site is now home to the Penn Highland Building, a retail apartment building. In an attempt to save the site, the building was nominated in January 2015 as a City Historic Site by Preservation Pittsburgh.

== Architecture ==
The building at 6018 Penn Ave was constructed in 1917 in the Commercial Gothic Revival architectural style. The exterior of the building was occupied by a terracotta veneer, and had an ornate design on the second floor, which replaced the original glass façade of the building in the 1950s. The building today no longer stands as it did, and along with several of the buildings next door to it, is now the site of a modern style apartment building.

== Gallery ==
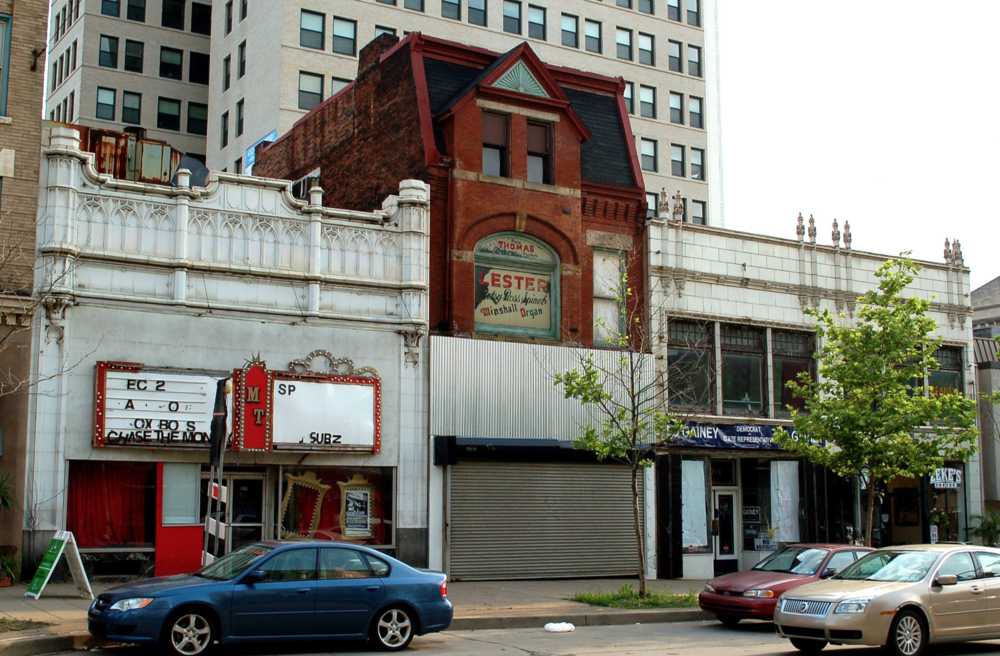
Photo of the building prior to demolition

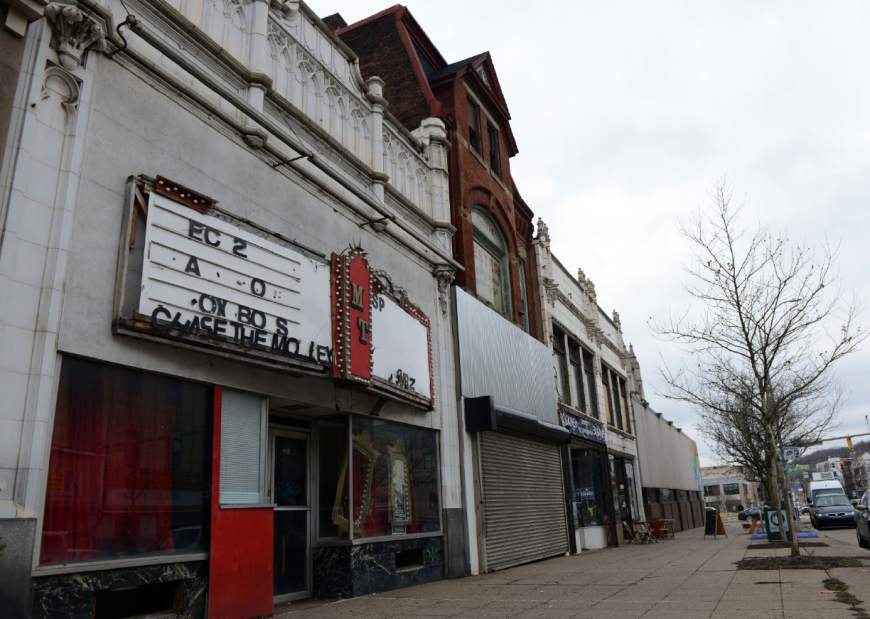
Side view of the former building

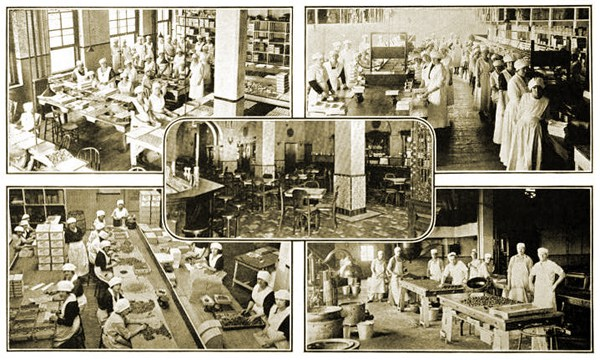
Inside of the Reymer & Brothers factory

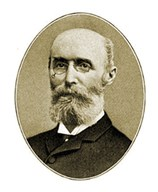
Portrait of Philip Reymer

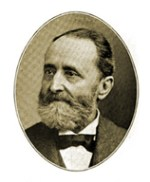
Portrait of Jacob Reymer

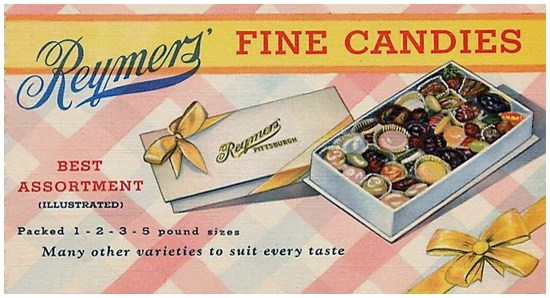
Reymer & Brothers candy advertisement

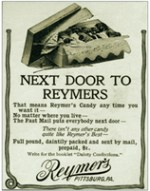
Advertisement for Reymer & Brothers
