= Mary Gleason =

Mary Gleason may refer to:

- Mary Gleason (basketball), American college basketball coach
- Mary J. L. Gleason, justice with the Federal Court of Appeal
- Mary Pat Gleason (born 1950), American actress and writer
- Mary Smith Gleason (1899–1967), interim member of the Louisiana House of Representatives
