= Gleeson (surname) =

Gleeson is an Irish and English surname. It is an anglicisation of the Irish name Ó Glasáin or Ó Gliasáin. The name is most common in County Tipperary, but originates in East County Cork, in the once-powerful Uí Liatháin kingdom, where the Gleesons were great lords and sometimes kings.

Notable people with the surname include:

== Arts and entertainment ==
- Brendan Gleeson (born 1955), Irish actor
- Brian Gleeson (actor) (born 1987), son of Brendan
- Dave Gleeson (born 1968), Australian rock singer
- Domhnall Gleeson (born 1983), Irish actor, son of Brendan
- Gabe Gleeson, aka Indian Summer, Australian record producer and musician
- Paul Gleeson (magician) (born 1987), Irish TV magician, mentalist and escapologist
- Jack Gleeson (born 1992), Irish actor
- James Gleeson (1915–2008), Australian surrealist artist, poet, and writer
- Johnny Tom Gleeson (1853–1924), Irish poet and songwriter
- Seán Gleeson, British actor, director and producer
- Simon Gleeson (born 1977), Australian soap opera actor in the UK
- Tom Gleeson (born 1974), Australian stand-up comedian, writer, television and radio presenter

== Law ==
- Dermot Gleeson (born 1949), Irish barrister, government adviser, and businessman
- Jacqueline Gleeson (born 1966), Australian judge, daughter of Murray Gleeson
- John Gleeson (judge) (born 1953), American judge
- Justin Gleeson (born 1961), Solicitor-General of Australia 2012–2016
- Murray Gleeson (born 1938), Australian jurist, Chief Justice of the High Court of Australia

== Politics ==
- Hampton Gleeson (1834–1907), Australian miner, pastoralist, politician and brewer
- Thomas Gleeson (Australian politician) (1895–1975), member of the New South Wales Legislative Council
- Thomas Gleeson (American politician), member of the Wisconsin State Assembly

== Sport ==
=== Association football ===
- Dan Gleeson (born 1985), English football player
- Jake Gleeson (born 1990), New Zealand football goalkeeper
- Eileen Gleeson (born 1972), Irish football manager
- Stephen Gleeson (born 1988), Irish professional football player

=== Australian football ===
- Adrian Gleeson (born 1967), Australian rules football player
- Bill Gleeson (1931–1998), Australian rules footballer with St Kilda
- Brian Gleeson (footballer) (born 1934)
- Martin Gleeson (Australian footballer) (born 1994), Australian rules football player

=== Hurling ===
- John Gleeson (hurler) (born 1941), Irish hurler
- William Gleeson (hurler, fl. 1880s) (fl. 1880s) Irish hurler who played for Cork
- Willie Gleeson (1893–1975), Irish hurler who played for Limerick

=== Rugby league ===
- John Gleeson (rugby league) (1938–2021), Australian rugby league footballer
- Martin Gleeson (rugby league) (born 1980), English rugby league player
- Sean Gleeson (rugby league) (born 1987), English rugby league player
- Tom Gleeson (rugby league), Australian rugby league player

=== Other sports ===
- John Gleeson (cricketer) (1938–2016), Australian cricketer
- Keith Gleeson (born 1976), Irish Australian rugby union football player
- Paul Gleeson (tennis) (1880–1956), American tennis player
- Robert Gleeson (1873–1919), South African cricketer
- Tom Gleeson (rugby union), Irish rugby union player
- Trevor Gleeson (born 1966), Australian basketball coach
- Jack Gleeson (rugby union), All Blacks Coach

== Other fields ==
- Dermot Gleeson (BBC) (born 1949), British governor of BBC
- Edward Burton Gleeson (1803–1870), South Australian pioneer, founder of the town of Clare
- Irene Gleeson (1944–2013), Australian humanitarian
- Maree Gleeson, Australian immunologist
- William Gleeson (priest) (1827–1903), Irish-American historian, linguist, and missionary

== Fictional characters ==
- Summer Gleeson, character in Batman: The Animated Series
- Tiger Gleeson, one of the main protagonists in Round the Twist

== See also ==
- Gleason (surname)
- Gleeson (disambiguation)
