= Foz Cataratas Futsal =

Brazilian futsal club

Foz Cataratas
- Full name: Foz Cataratas Futsal
- Founded: 19 February 2010; 15 years ago as União Independente de Pais e Atletas
- Ground: Ginásio Ministro Costa Cavalcanti
- Capacity: 3,500
- Owner: União Independente de Pais e Atletas
- Chairman: Adélio Demeterko
- Coach: Vanildo Neto
- League: LNF
- 2022: 17th of 22
colours	colours

Foz Cataratas Futsal, is a Brazilian futsal club based in Foz do Iguaçu. It has won the 2018 edition of Chave Ouro.

== Club honours ==
=== State competitions ===
- Chave Ouro: 2018

== Current squad ==
As of 22 May 2019

#	Position	Name	Nationality
2	Winger	Fernandinho	(Brazil)
3	Defender	Gleidson Saturnino	(Brazil)
4	Defender	Leo Evangelista	(Brazil)
5	Winger	Willian Brandão	(Brazil)
6	Pivot	Jaison Ramos	(Brazil)
7	Pivot	Andrei Grolli	(Brazil)
8	Winger	William Santos	(Brazil)
10	Winger	Daniel Feitosa	(Brazil)
12	Goalkeeper	Peixe	(Brazil)
13	Defender	Leo Costa	(Brazil)
14	Winger	João Gaúcho	(Brazil)
16	Winger	Pedro Gaúcho	(Brazil)
17	Defender	Allex Roberth	(Brazil)
18	Winger	Pedro Augusto	(Brazil)
19	Winger	Zico	(Brazil)
20	Defender	Matheus Sacon	(Brazil)
21	Goalkeeper	João Paulo	(Brazil)
31	Winger	Guilherme Ouchita	(Brazil)
39	Pivot	Vitão	(Brazil)
77	Winger	Luan Cola	(Brazil)
92	Goalkeeper	Henrique Rafagnin	(Brazil)
94	Winger	Rodrigo Trentin	(Brazil)
99	Winger	Brayan Pacagnan	(Brazil)
