= Highland Building =

- U.S. National Register of Historic Places
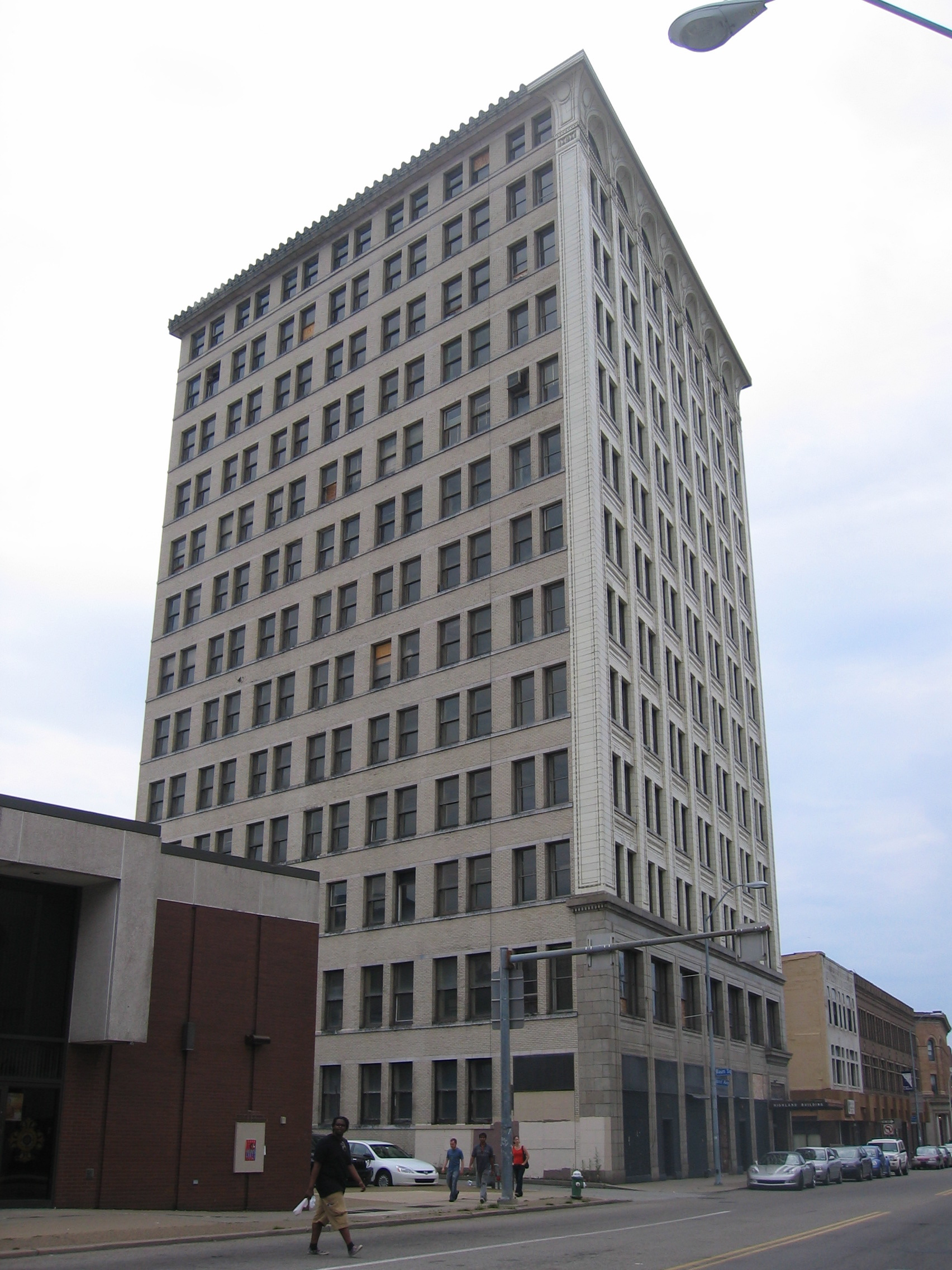

- Location within Pittsburgh Location within Pennsylvania Location within the United States
- Location: 121 S. Highland Ave, Pittsburgh, Pennsylvania
- Coordinates: 40°27′36″N 79°55′29″W
- Area: 0.2 acres (0.081 ha)
- Built: 1909
- Architect: Burnham, D.H., Co.
- Architectural style: Chicago
- NRHP reference No.: 91001123
- Added to NRHP: September 06, 1991

The Highland Building is a thirteen-story building which is located in the East Liberty neighborhood of Pittsburgh, Pennsylvania.

== History and architectural features ==
Construction on the building was completed in 1909, with Daniel Burnham being the principal designer. It was listed on the National Register of Historic Places in 1991.

Henry Clay Frick originally commissioned the building. Following the Chicago school of architecture style, the building features a granite base and terracotta exterior.

Beginning sometime around the 1960s, the building gradually fell into disrepair coinciding with the decline of East Liberty. A classical ornament on the roof was replaced with substandard material, allowing water to enter the basement. Over time, the interior was essentially destroyed.

The Highland Building subsequently experienced twenty years of complete dormancy during the latter part of the twentieth century and early twenty-first century. With assistance from the state of Pennsylvania and the Urban Redevelopment Authority of Pittsburgh, a new renovation effort was launched in 2012 to restore the exterior and reconstruct the interior of the Highland Building, attach it to the adjacent three-story Wallace Building and convert the entire complex into one hundred and twenty-seven apartments. The project, now completed, is described as, "Walnut on Highland" and is mostly leased. Recently, the last of the retail space in the Wallace Building was filled by a Mexican Restaurant.
