= Gleison =

Gleison may refer to:

- Gleison (footballer, born 1984), full name Gleison Rezende Vilela, Brazilian football striker
- Gleison (footballer, born 1995), full name Gleison Wilson da Silva Moreira, Brazilian football forward
- Gleison Bremer (born 1997), Brazilian football centre-back
- Gleison Santos (born 1981), Brazilian football defender
- Gleison Tibau (born 1983), Brazilian mixed martial artist

== See also ==
- Gleason (disambiguation)
- Gleidson (disambiguation)
