= Diana Fuss =

American scholar of literature

Diana Fuss is a professor of literature, film, and feminist studies. She is the emeritus Louis W. Fairchild Class of ‘24 Professor of English at Princeton University.

Fuss earned her PhD in English and Semiotics from Brown University and then joined the Princeton faculty in 1988.

Her book The Sense of an Interior won the Modern Language Association's James Russell Lowell Prize in 2004.

She edited the collection Inside/Out and co-edited The Pocket Instructor: 101 Exercises for the College Classroom with William A. Gleason.

== Works ==
=== As author ===
- Essentially Speaking (Routledge, 1989)
- Identification Papers (Routledge, 1995)
- The Sense of an Interior: Four Writers and the Rooms that Shaped Them (Routledge, 2004)
- Dying Modern: A Meditation on Elegy (Duke University Press, 2013)

=== As editor ===
- Inside/Out: Lesbian Theories, Gay Theories (Routledge, 1991)
- Pink Freud (GLQ, 1995)
- Human, All Too Human (Essays from the English Institute) (Routledge, 1996)
- The Pocket Instructor: Literature (with William A. Gleason, Princeton University Press, 2015)
