= Friendship (Pittsburgh) =

- Neighborhood of Pittsburgh
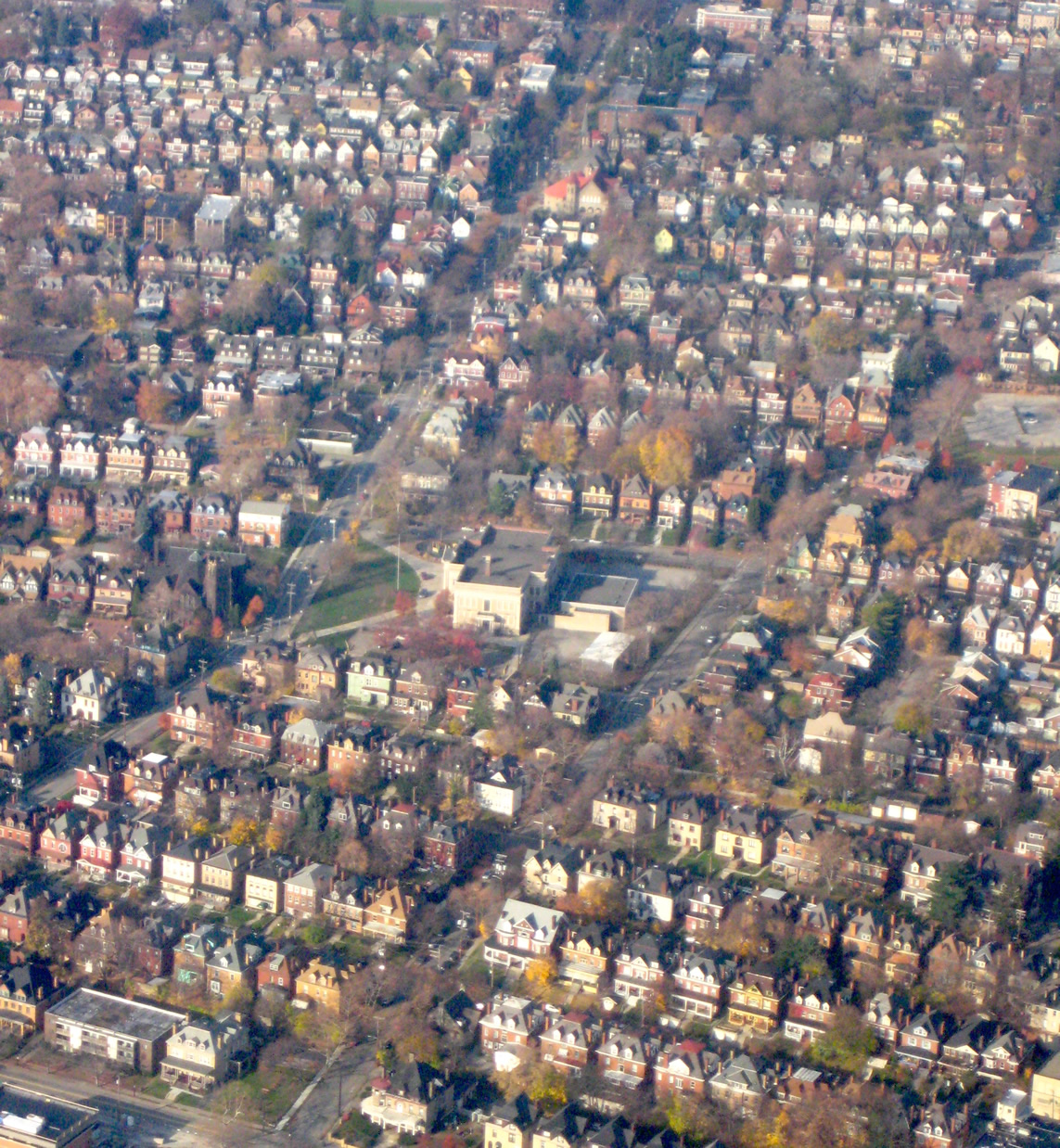

- Coordinates: 40.462°N 79.934°W
- Country: United States
- State: Pennsylvania
- County: Allegheny County
- City: Pittsburgh

Area
  - Total: 0.106 sq mi (0.27 km^{2})

Population (2010)
  - Total: 1,785
  - Density: 16,800/sq mi (6,500/km^{2})

Friendship is a neighborhood of large Victorian houses in the East End of the City of Pittsburgh, Pennsylvania, United States, about four miles (6 km) east of Pittsburgh's Golden Triangle. Friendship is bordered on the north by Garfield (at Penn Avenue), on the east by East Liberty (at Negley Avenue), on the south by Shadyside (at Centre Avenue), and on the west by Bloomfield (at Graham Street, according to the City of Pittsburgh). It is divided into three Pittsburgh City Council districts (7, 8, and 9).

== History ==
The City of Pittsburgh annexed the East End in 1868. What is now Bloomfield was developed first and was divided into narrow plots and used for rowhouses. The Roup holdings—today's Friendship—began to be developed later, when trolleys running along Baum Boulevard extended beyond Bloomfield in the 1890s.

Friendship was therefore built as a streetcar suburb, and its houses are large, square homes with elaborate architectural embellishments designed for professional-class families in the Victorian period. As a streetcar suburb, Friendship lacks its own business district, but its residents have access to shopping on Penn Avenue in nearby Garfield and East Liberty, on Liberty Avenue in Bloomfield, and on Walnut Street in Shadyside.

From the 1890s through the 1950s, Friendship was inhabited by prosperous families. Beginning around 1960, many of these families moved to the suburbs: they were attracted by perceived opportunities outside the city, and repulsed by the construction of large housing projects in nearby Garfield and East Liberty, and by urban renewal projects that damaged the previously-vibrant East Liberty commercial zone. After a zoning change in the 1950s, landlords broke the massive old Victorian houses up into multi-unit apartments, and ripped out or painted over many of their amenities in the process. By the 1980s, over 70% of the housing stock in Friendship was owned by landlords, many absentee.

Friendship experienced something of a second birth in the late 1980s. Urban homesteaders began to move into Friendship, looking past the blight to see an opportunity to buy large homes with features—high ceilings, plaster walls, stained-glass windows, and ornate woodwork—that were not available in newer suburban homes.

Because these new residents were focused on the housing stock, they saw Friendship as a unique neighborhood in its own right, with homes distinct from those in any of the bordering neighborhoods. By the early 1990s, the newcomers had succeeded in getting the neighborhood known as "Friendship", and had organized a Friendship Preservation Group to advocate for the area, and a subsidiary, the Friendship Development Associates, to buy and rehabilitate the most dilapidated properties. By 2004, a number of artists and architects had gravitated to the neighborhood, and its future seemed bright.

== Name and identity ==
Friendship takes its name from Friendship Avenue, an east-west thoroughfare that runs from Bloomfield to East Liberty. Some residents claim that Friendship Avenue is named after an alleged friendship between Joseph Conrad Winebiddle and William Penn. But this is a myth: the men were not contemporaries, and William Penn never visited Western Pennsylvania. Friendship Avenue in fact takes its name from a local farm that stood at the corner of Friendship and Roup and was named "Friendship" by its owner, one of Penn's descendants, who like Penn was a member of the religious Society of Friends.

As a wholly residential neighborhood, Friendship lacked an initial identity: early residents considered themselves to be living, not in Friendship, but in the nearest neighborhood with a business district. Since the 1990s newer residents, who are focused on the housing stock that makes Friendship distinct from its neighbors, and are often involved in organizations like the Friendship Preservation Group, have successfully encouraged the wider Pittsburgh community to call the area "Friendship" and to consider it as a unique neighborhood.

== Border Dispute ==
Because "Friendship" is a new name for an old neighborhood, Friendship's western border with Bloomfield is to some extent a disputed one. The City of Pittsburgh defines neighborhoods to be contiguous with federal census tracts, and as a result considers Friendship to abut Bloomfield at South Graham Street, at the western edge of census tract 807. However, the Friendship Community Group considers the border between Bloomfield and Friendship to lie at Gross Street. This western boundary includes census tract 806 and parts of tract 809, and corresponds to City of Pittsburgh zoning maps from the 1920s, but were defined by neighborhood surveys between 1990 and 1994, in which residents of Friendship, Garfield, Bloomfield, and Lawrenceville were asked to identify their own neighborhood.

== Work ==
Friendship is a strictly residential neighborhood, but many residents are employed by nearby hospitals and universities, including the University of Pittsburgh Medical Center, the University of Pittsburgh and Carnegie Mellon University. Friendship is within easy walking distance of UPMC – Shadyside, West Penn Hospital, and the new Children's Hospital on Penn Avenue and is about a half-hour on foot from the hospitals and universities in Oakland.

== See also ==
- List of Pittsburgh neighborhoods
