= East Liberty station =

Former passenger depot in Pennsylvania, United States

East Liberty
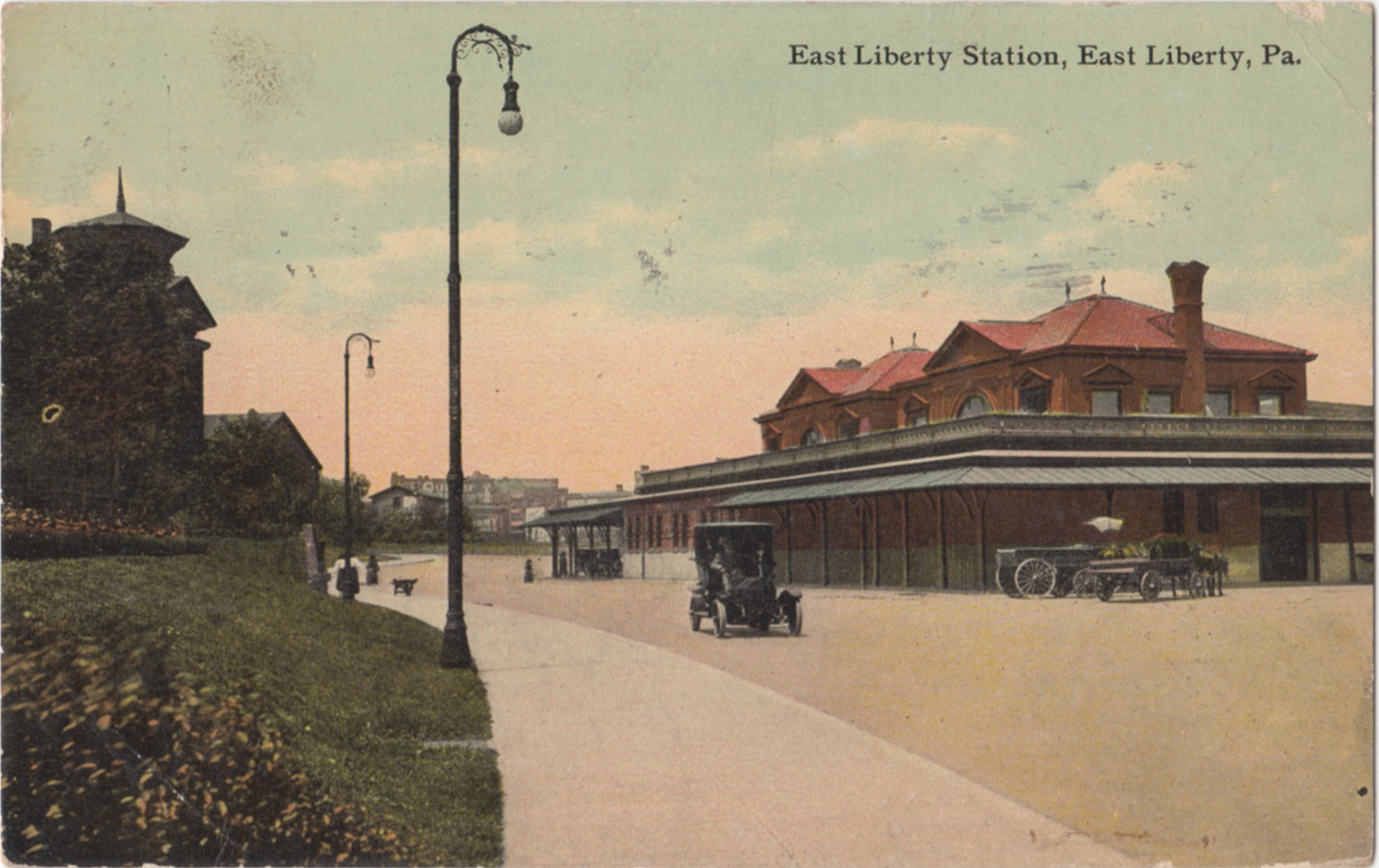
- Postcard showing East Liberty station about 1913

General information
- Coordinates: 40.4599°N 79.9182°W
- Line: Pittsburgh Line

History
- Closed: December 1, 1966

Former services
Preceding station	Pennsylvania Railroad	Following station
Pittsburgh toward Chicago	Main Line	Wilkinsburg toward New York or Exchange Place
Roop toward Pittsburgh	Pitcairn Local ended 1964	Fifth Avenue toward North Trafford
Pittsburgh Terminus	Pittsburgh – Oil City	Verona toward Oil City
Pittsburgh Terminus	Kittanning Local ended 1964	34th Street toward Kittanning
Location

East Liberty station was a passenger depot for the Pennsylvania Railroad located on its Main Line in the East Liberty neighborhood of Pittsburgh, Pennsylvania, U.S.A. The station existed from the mid-nineteenth century until 1963, when the last building was demolished.

== History ==
In the late 1840s, the Pennsylvania Railroad sought to connect Philadelphia and Pittsburgh by rail via the state capital, Harrisburg, a route that eventually became known as its Main Line. The section passing through the area known as East Liberty (so named because it was part of the eastern grazing land—or "liberty"—outside Pittsburgh) was completed in 1851, but the entire Main Line connecting the eastern and western principal cities of Pennsylvania would not be completed for another year. By 1855, maps indicate that the railroad had established a station at East Liberty, near where the railroad tracks traversed what would become Penn Avenue.

East Liberty, along with surrounding areas, was annexed to Pittsburgh formally in 1868, and in the post-Civil War era of the late nineteenth century these neighborhoods began to develop substantially, with East Liberty becoming a commercial and retail hub serving the growing residential sections of Shadyside, Homewood, Wilkinsburg, and Highland Park. The railroad also developed extensive stockyards and a freight depot to the east of the passenger station, located on the south side of the railroad tracks. Large numbers of passengers used the station as commuters from these areas into downtown Pittsburgh on a daily basis.

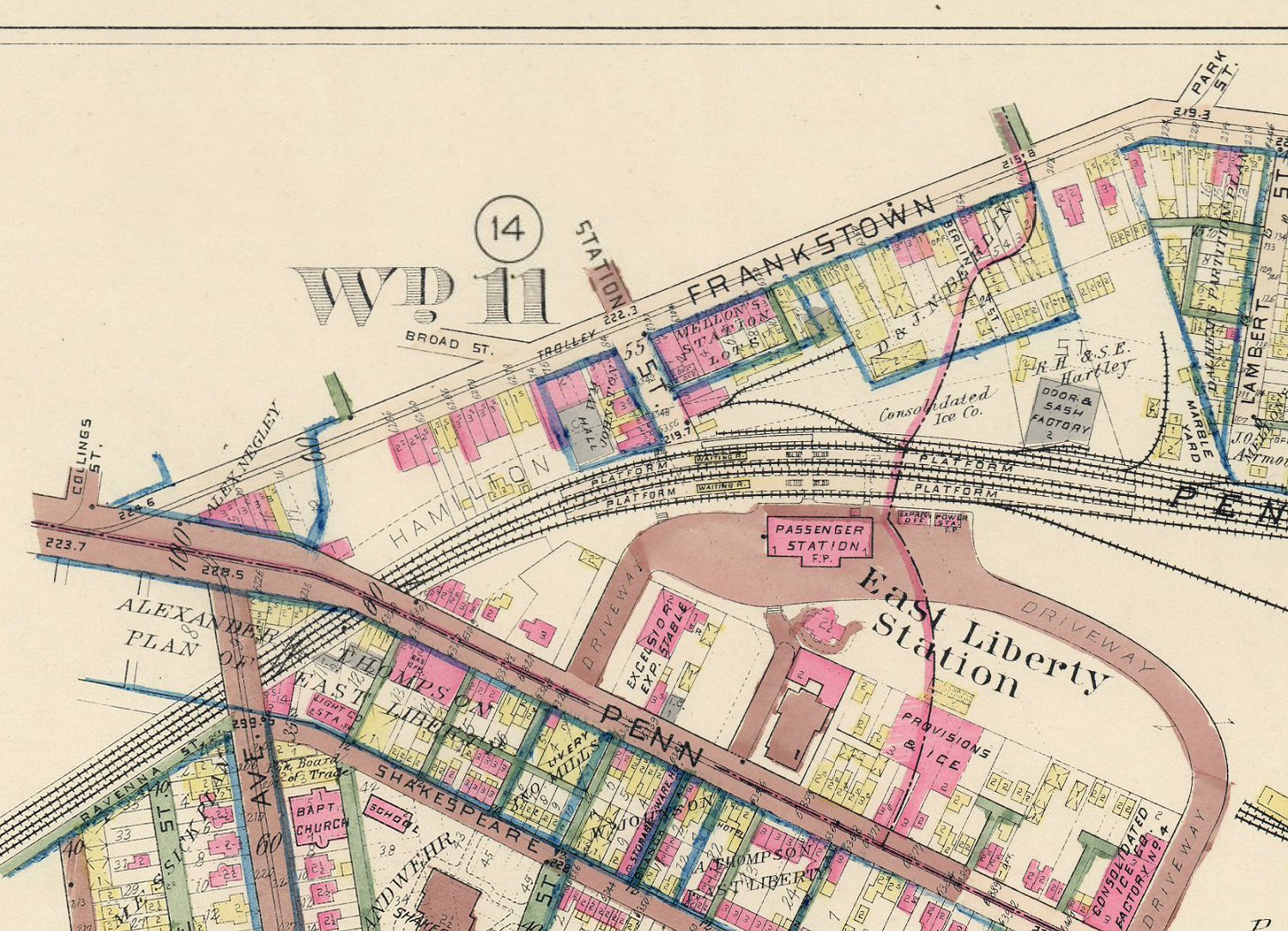
Map of East Liberty neighborhood in 1910, showing new passenger station with commodious driveway.

In 1905, the Pennsylvania Railroad decided to construct a new station to serve the increased passenger traffic. They hired famed Philadelphia architect Frank Furness, who had already enlarged Broad Street Station in Philadelphia, the crown jewel of the PRR's sprawling network, in the early 1890s and designed several PRR suburban stations along the Main Line outside Philadelphia. The station was located several yards to the east of the old structure, which was demolished shortly afterwards. The new station was accessed from Penn Avenue via a large driveway that looped around behind several businesses directly fronting the avenue, including an express livery stable. The new two-story brick station used a T-shaped plan, with a gabled roof and two large arched lunette windows on the front façade. It was nearly completely encircled by a large porch, and contained two covered steel island platforms among the four tracks. The impressive arcaded ticket lobby was lit by several skylights.

Rail service continued to East Liberty through the drastic decline in ridership after World War II, and the station building was demolished in 1963. The Pennsylvania Railroad formally dropped all suburban commuter rail service around Pittsburgh in 1964, with final passenger service ending in 1966. A strip mall now stands on the site.

== See also ==
- East Liberty (PAT station)
- Pennsylvania Railroad
- Main Line
