= Gleeson =

Gleeson may refer to:

- Gleeson, Arizona, an American ghost town
- Gleeson College, Adelaide, Australia, a Catholic secondary school
- Gleeson (surname), people with the surname
- Gleeson Hedge, a character in mythology novels by Rick Riordan

== See also ==
- Gleeson gunfight (1917), one of the last gunfights of the American Old West
- M J Gleeson, a UK-based housingbuilding company
- Gleason (disambiguation)
