= Gleydson =

Gleydson is a given name. It may refer to:

- Gleydson Carvalho (1982–2015), Brazilian radio show host

== See also ==
- Gleidson (disambiguation)
- Glaydson
