= William Gleeson =

William Gleeson may refer to:

- William Gleeson (hurler, fl. 1880s), Irish hurler for Cork
- William Gleeson (priest) (1827–1903), Roman Catholic priest, missionary, linguist, and historian
- Willie Gleeson (William Joseph Gleeson, 1893–1975), Irish hurler for Limerick
- Bill Gleeson (William Joseph Gleeson, 1931–1998), Australian rules footballer

== See also ==
- William Gleason (disambiguation)
