= Daniel Feitosa =

Brazilian futsal player

Personal information
- Full name: Daniel Feitosa de Araújo Monteiro
- Date of birth: 18 September 1992 (age 34)
- Place of birth: João Pessoa, Brazil
- Position: Winger

Team information
- Current team: Operario Laranjeiras
- Number: 10

Youth career
- Benfica FC

Senior career*
Years	Team	Apps	(Gls)
2012	João Pessoa		
2012–2013	Treze FC		
2014	Blumenau		
2015	Concórdia		
2016	Guarapuava	19	(13)
2017–	Foz Cataratas	38	(13)

International career
2017–	Brazil		
- * Club domestic league appearances and goals as of 00:00, 5 March 2019 (UTC)

Daniel Feitosa de Araújo Monteiro (born 18 September 1992) is a Brazilian futsal player who plays as a winger for Operário Laranjeiras and the Brazilian national futsal team.
