= Hotel Gleason/Albemarle Hotel, Imperial Cafe =

- U.S. National Register of Historic Places
- Virginia Landmarks Register
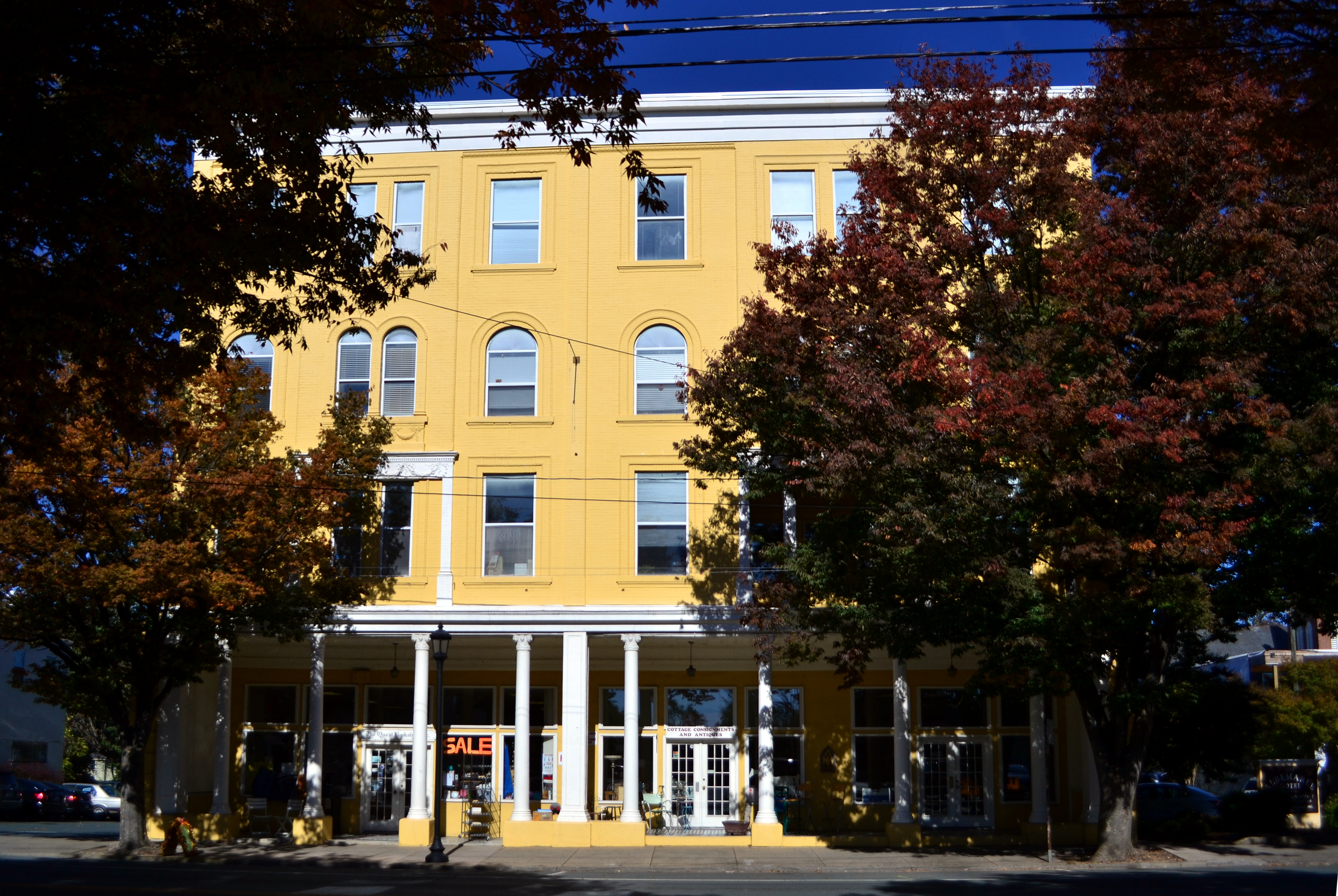
- Hotel Gleason / Albemarle Hotel / Imperial Cafe

- Location within Virginia Location within the United States
- Location: 617-619 W. Main St., Charlottesville, Virginia
- Coordinates: 38°1′52″N 78°29′21″W
- Area: less than one acre
- Built: 1896
- Architectural style: Late Victorian, Victorian
- MPS: Charlottesville MRA
- NRHP reference No.: 83003267
- VLR No.: 104-0374

Significant dates
- Added to NRHP: August 10, 1983
- Designated VLR: October 20, 1981

Hotel Gleason/Albemarle Hotel, Imperial Cafe is a historic hotel and commercial building located at Charlottesville, Virginia. It was built in 1896, and has a three-bay, three-story pressed-brick facade raised above the ground-floor recessed loggia in the Late Victorian style. The loggia is supported on four Corinthian order columns. The hotel closed in 1976.

It was listed on the National Register of Historic Places in 1983.
