= Edmund Gleason Farm =

Historic house in Ohio, United States

- Edmund Gleason House; Edmund Gleason Farm (Boundary Increase)
- U.S. National Register of Historic Places
- U.S. Historic district
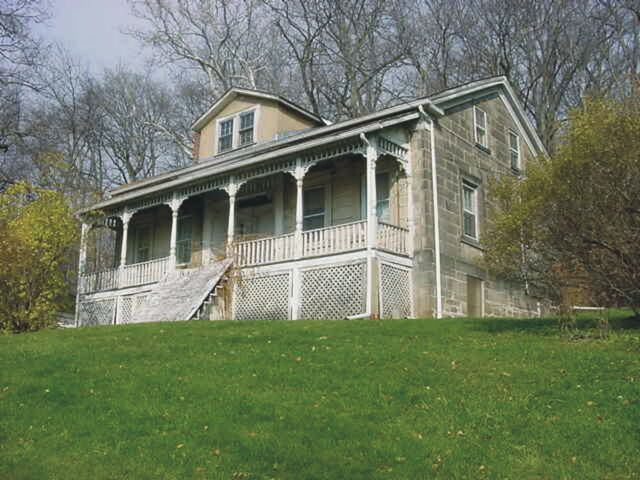
- Edmond Gleeson House

- Location within Ohio Location within the United States
- Location: 7243 Canal Rd., Valley View, Ohio
- Coordinates: 41°22′2″N 81°36′39″W
- Area: 2 acres (0.81 ha) (original); 13 acres (5.3 ha) (increase)
- Built: 1851
- Architectural style: Greek Revival (original); Wisconsin Dairy Barn (increase)
- MPS: Agricultural Resources of the Cuyahoga Valley MPS
- NRHP reference No.: 78000377 and 93000075
- Added to NRHP: December 18, 1978 (original); March 12, 1993 (increase)

The Edmund Gleason Farm is a historic district in Valley View, Ohio, United States. The core house was built in 1851 and was listed on the National Register of Historic Places in 1978 along with another building, on a 2-acre (0.81 ha) property. The historic designation was expanded in 1993 to add 13 acres (5.3 ha) including a dairy barn. In the twentieth century, the property became part of the Cuyahoga Valley National Park.

Gleason's house is a sandstone structure built into a hillside near the main line of the Ohio and Erie Canal. Its plan is that of a simple rectangle, divided into two bays on the ends and five on the front and rear, with the main entrance in the middle bay of the facade. The ends rise to gables, and elements such as gable returns and an undecorated frieze produce a Greek Revival appearance. The original structure was modified circa 1880, when a shed-roofed wooden porch was constructed; it bears its own ornamentation, including a bracketed frieze and a spindled railing.

Gleason and his wife Charlotte settled in present-day Valley View in an unknown year, although his first appearance in the tax records dates from 1843. According to the 1850 census, Gleason was a native of New York, and at the time of the census, he was engaged in farming.
