= Dr. Edward Francis Gleason House =

Historic house in Massachusetts, United States

- U.S. National Register of Historic Places
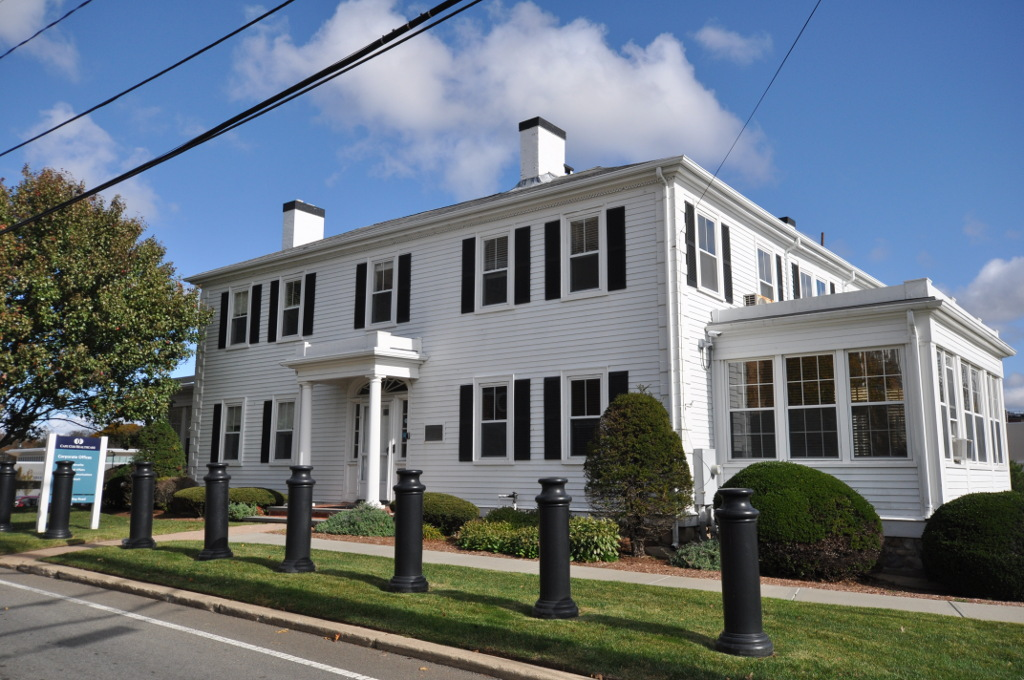

- Location within Cape Cod Location within Massachusetts Location within the United States
- Location: 88 Lewis Bay Rd., Barnstable, Massachusetts
- Coordinates: 41°39′10″N 70°16′30″W
- Area: 1.45 acres (0.59 ha)
- Built: 1790
- Architectural style: Federal
- MPS: Barnstable MRA
- NRHP reference No.: 87000262
- Added to NRHP: September 18, 1987

The Dr. Edward Francis Gleason House is a historic house in Barnstable, Massachusetts, United States.

== Description and history ==
The two story wood-frame house was built c. 1790, and is a fine local example of Federal styling. It has an L shape, with intersecting hip roofs, and two interior chimneys. The main entry is centered on the five-bay front facade, and is elaborately framed with sidelight windows and a fanlight, and is sheltered by a portico with Tuscan columns. The house is notable for its association with Dr. Edward Francis Gleason, founder of Cape Cod Hospital, and for its ownership by Timothy Baker, a ship's captain engaged in the coasting trade.

The house was listed on the National Register of Historic Places on September 18, 1987.

== See also ==
- National Register of Historic Places listings in Barnstable County, Massachusetts
