= Gleason Building =

Gleason Building may refer to:

- Gleason Building (Lawrence, Massachusetts), NRHP-listed
- Gleason Building (Stevensville, Montana), listed on the NRHP in Ravalli, Montana

== See also ==
- Gleason House (disambiguation)
