= Gleason, West Virginia =

Unincorporated community in West Virginia, United States

Gleason
- Unincorporated community
- Location within the state of West Virginia Gleason (the United States)
- Coordinates: 39°21′46″N 79°13′02″W
- Country: United States
- State: West Virginia
- County: Mineral
- Elevation: 1,765 ft (538 m)
- Time zone: UTC-5 (Eastern (EST))
  - Summer (DST): UTC-4 (EDT)
- GNIS feature ID: 1557043

Gleason was an unincorporated community located in Mineral County, West Virginia, United States.
