= Ceann =

American rock band

- Origin: Pittsburgh, Pennsylvania
- Genres: Irish rock, Celtic rock
- Years active: 2005-present
- Labels: CD Baby and Independent (2005-present)
- Members: Jeff Hoag; Brian Halloran; Scott Taylor; Tom Snodgrass; Patrick Mannion; Greg Sloan; Dan Rusnak; Marc Wisnosky
- Past members: Patrick Halloran; James G. Telfer, IV; John Shea; James Gleason

Ceann is an American rock band from Pittsburgh, Pennsylvania Most commonly known for their song "Pittsburgh Makes Me Drunk". Their influences include Pat McCurdy, The Kingston Trio, Great Big Sea, Cake, The Pogues, Johnny Cash, Flogging Molly, Ween, They Might Be Giants, The Town Pants, Barenaked Ladies and Willie Nelson.

== History ==
Patrick Halloran and Marc Wisnosky started the band in college, while undergraduates at The University of Pittsburgh. They wanted to play some Irish songs at a party on St. Patrick's Day of 1999, so they learned a few of the classic Irish pub tunes and wrote a couple of original Pittsburgh-themed Irish songs. They started off by playing at an open mic event. They began to play about fifteen to twenty Irish songs and then would eventually switch to songs by 'N Sync, Hanson, Snoop Dogg, NWA.

Patrick and Marc played in small bars in New York City and Pittsburgh into 2001, when they recorded their album Key-anna Ka-Ka with bass and fiddler player James Telfer in Saul Zonana's basement studio. This acoustic trio consisting of Halloran, Wisnosky, and Telfer IV played Irish pub music across the northeast with one two-week tour into North Carolina, Georgia, and Florida in 2004.

In 2005, the band shortened their name to Ceann. Ceann continued to mix fun Irish music with their popular originals. While some of Ceann's songs revolve around the culture of being Irish Americans, many of Ceann's most popular songs have distinctively more contemporary themes. Their songs appeal far beyond the normal reach of Irish music and have given them access to unprecedented markets for an Irish band. As one of the only Irish bands to find success on commercial radio, Ceann's fan base has grown as quickly outside of Irish music circles as quickly as it's grown within them. Their cross market appeal allowed them to be featured at Irish festivals and at non-Irish music festivals to equal success.

On February 1, 2011 lead singer Patrick Halloran was killed in a car accident in Vermont. The remaining members of Ceann, along with past members, played together at Halloran's memorial service. In July 2020, fiddle player Patrick "Tricky" Manion passed away.

In the summer of 2013, various Ceann members got together in Pittsburgh, PA, New York, NY, and Virginia Beach, VA to play shows in support of the tribute album The Legend of Handsome Pat, a compilation of songs written by Halloran and recorded by various artists. Produced by Halloran's brother, Brian Halloran, the album features contributions by Brian Halloran, Ceann, Paul Tabachneck, The Hang Lows, Icewagon Flu, Scythian, The Havers, Peanut Butter & Julie, The Fighting Jamesons, Cruel Seamus, and Patrick Halloran.

=== Name ===
Ceann is pronounced "Key-ANN". It means head. The original name was Ceann na Caca, which is Gaelic for "Head of Poop." It wasn't supposed to be funny or clever. Ceann was only going to play one show to parody The Pogues' original name, Pogue Mahone, which means "kiss my ass". They realized that some people became hesitant to book them because of the name, so they shortened it to Ceann.

== Sound ==
Five to six guys of ambiguous descent playing something that may or may not sound like Irish music. Some people say we sound like or may be influenced by the following bands: Cake, Stephen Lynch, Johnny Cash, Flogging Molly, Ween, Great Big Sea, They Might Be Giants, Barenaked Ladies, Black 47, The Pogues.

== Members ==
- Patrick Halloran (1999–2011), vocals, guitar
- Jeffrey A Hoag (2005–present), mandolin, acoustic/electric guitar, vocals, banjo, harmonica
- Brian Halloran (2011–present), vocals, guitar & (2008–2009) bass guitar
- Scott Taylor (2005–present), drums, vocals
- Tom Snodgrass (2009–present), bass guitar
- Dan Rusnak (2008–present), baritone saxophone
- Greg Sloan (2008–present), alto saxophone
- Brian Fitzgerald (2010–present), electric violin
- Patrick "Tricky" Manion (2008–2010, 2011–2020), fiddle
- John Shea (2004–2006), drums
- James Gleason (2004–2006), banjo
- James G. Telfer, IV (2000–2008), bass guitar, fiddle, bodhran, vocals
- Marc Wisnosky (1999–present), vocals, tin whistle, bodhran, Irish tenor banjo

== Discography ==
- Key’-anna ‘Ka-ka, n. – 2001
- Us Drunk Live – 2003
- Almost Irish – 2006
- Rave, Rant, Lose Pants – 2007
- Making Friends – 2008
- It's Not Hard – 2009
- Last One's Standing – 2010
- The Legend of Handsome Pat – 2013 (contributed "The Sun is My Least Favorite Star')
