= Whitehill-Gleason Motors =

- U.S. National Register of Historic Places
- Pennsylvania Historical Marker signification
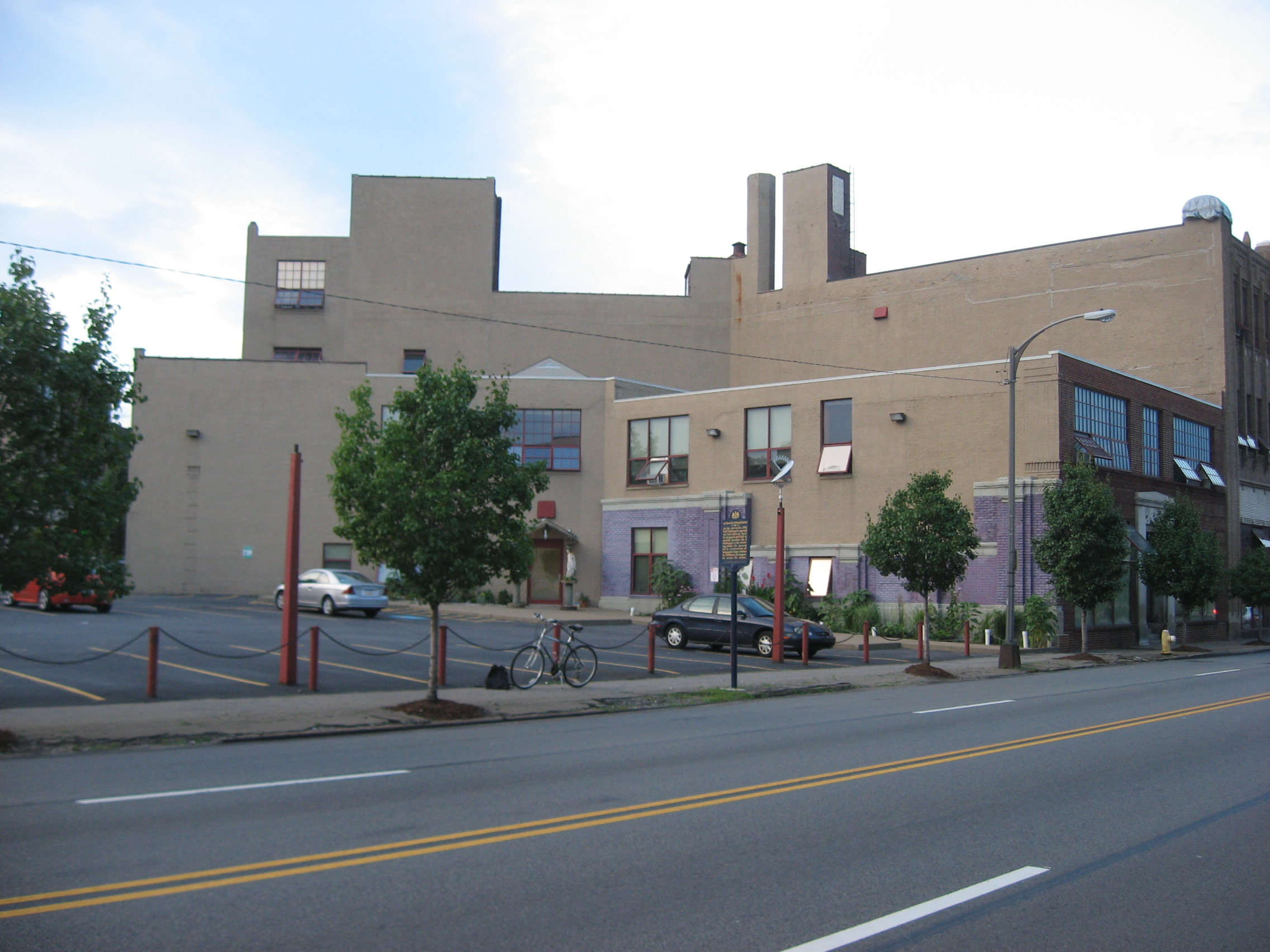

- Location within Pittsburgh Location within Pennsylvania Location within the United States
- Location: 5815 Baum Boulevard (East Liberty), Pittsburgh, Pennsylvania, USA
- Coordinates: 40°27′35″N 79°55′49″W
- Built: circa 1920s on the site of the first Drive-In Filling Station (1913)
- Architect: Maximilian Nirdlinger
- Architectural style: Early Commercial, Art Deco
- NRHP reference No.: 99000878

Significant dates
- Added to NRHP: July 22, 1999
- Designated PAHMDB: July 11, 2000

Whitehill-Gleason Motors at 5815 Baum Boulevard in the East Liberty neighborhood of Pittsburgh, Pennsylvania, was built in the 1920s on the site of the first drive-in filling station in the United States (1913).

It was added to the National Register of Historic Places on July 22, 1999, and was granted a Pennsylvania Historical Marker on July 11, 2000.

== History ==
In December 1913, the Gulf Refining Company opened its first drive-in facility, where motorists could purchase gasoline and oil and lubricant maintenance services for their automobiles, as well as road maps. Located on Pittsburgh's Baum Boulevard in the same neighborhood where multiple automobile dealerships were located, the station also offered free air and water and became so successful that additional drive-in filling stations were opened by Gulf and other gasoline retail companies nationwide.
