= East Liberty (Pittsburgh) =

- Neighborhood of Pittsburgh
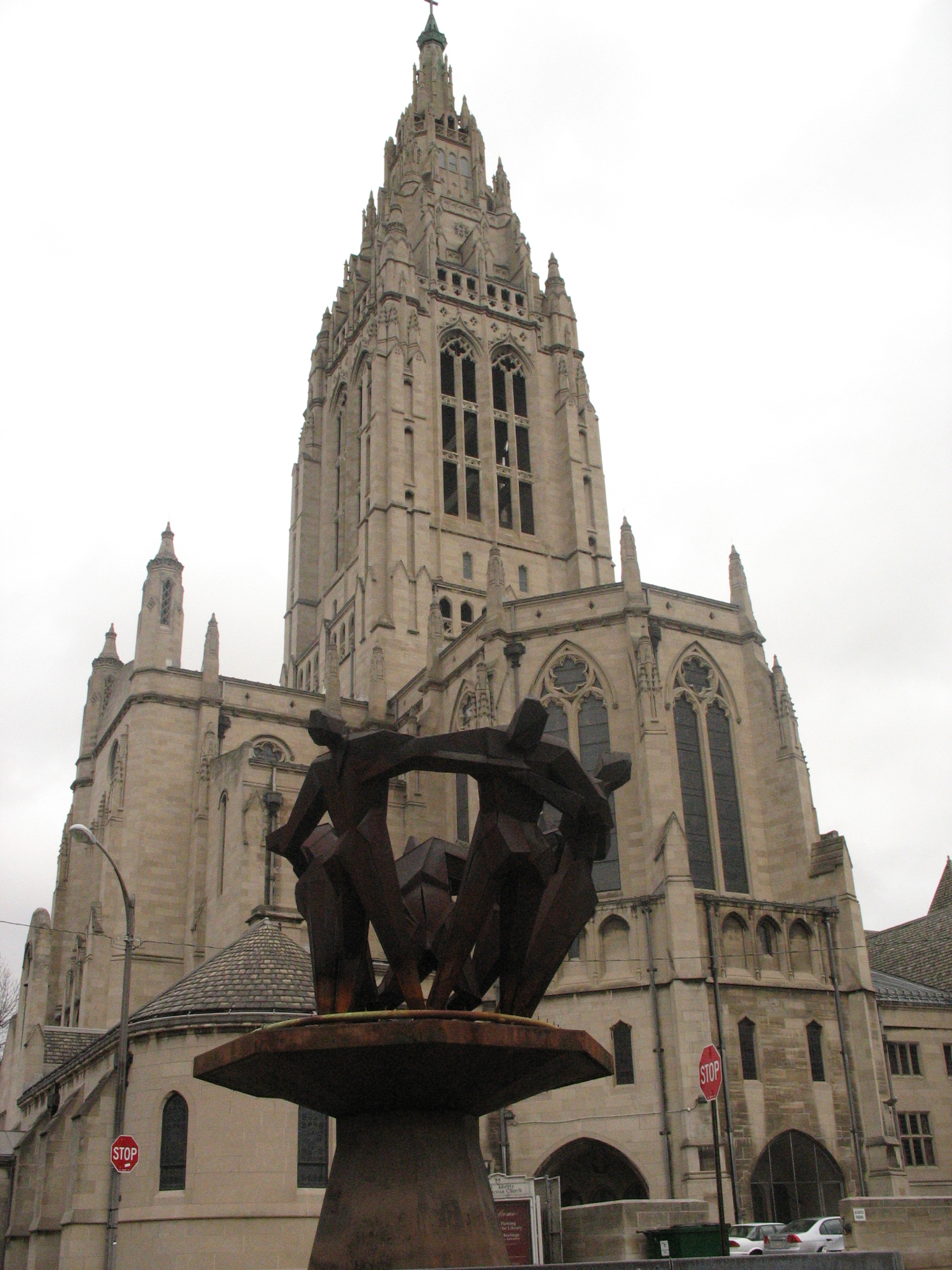
- East Liberty Presbyterian Church

- Coordinates: 40.462°N 79.924°W
- Country: United States
- State: Pennsylvania
- County: Allegheny County
- City: Pittsburgh

Area
  - Total: 0.581 sq mi (1.50 km^{2})

Population (2020)
  - Total: 6,187
  - Density: 10,600/sq mi (4,110/km^{2})

- East Liberty Commercial Historic District
- U.S. National Register of Historic Places
- U.S. Historic district
- Location within Pittsburgh Location within Pennsylvania Location within the United States
- Area: Roughly bounded by Penn, Sheridan, and Centre Avenues and Kirkwood and South Whitfield Streets
- NRHP reference No.: 10001072
- Added to NRHP: December 27, 2010

East Liberty is a neighborhood in Pittsburgh, Pennsylvania's East End. It is bordered by Highland Park, Morningside, Stanton Heights, Garfield, Friendship, Shadyside and Larimer, and falls largely within Pittsburgh City Council District 9, with a few areas in District 8. One of the most notable features in the East Liberty skyline is the East Liberty Presbyterian Church, which is an area landmark.

== Beginnings ==
Around the time of the American Revolution, East Liberty was a free grazing area in Allegheny County located a few miles east of the young, growing town called Pittsburgh. (In older English usage, a "liberty" was a plot of common land on the outskirts of a town.)

Two farming patriarchs owned much of the nearby land, and their descendants' names grace streets in and around East Liberty today. John Conrad Winebiddle owned land west of present-day East Liberty, in what are now Bloomfield, Garfield, and Friendship, and his daughter Barbara inherited a portion close to what is now East Liberty. Alexander Negley owned a farm called "Fertile Bottom" north of present-day East Liberty along the southern bank of the Allegheny River. Negley's land included some of present-day East Liberty and much of nearby Highland Park, Morningside, Larimer, and Stanton Heights.

Alexander Negley's son Jacob married Barbara Winebiddle, built a manor house, and developed a village that he called East Liberty after the old grazing commons. In 1816, Negley saw to it that the Pittsburgh-Greensburg turnpike was built through East Liberty, which made the area a trading center and ensured its future growth.

== Growth ==
East Liberty truly began to develop as a commercial area in 1843, when Jacob's daughter Sarah Jane Negley married the ambitious lawyer Thomas Mellon. Mellon had first visited the area of modern-day East Liberty in 1823, when as a 10-year-old he saw the Negley mansion for the first time and decided he wanted something like it. He achieved this goal and much more: after first becoming a prosperous lawyer, he made his true fortune by marrying Sarah Jane Negley, selling or renting the land near East Liberty that she inherited, and using the proceeds to finance Pittsburgh's nascent industries. Like Jacob Negley before him, Thomas Mellon worked to make East Liberty a transportation hub: Mellon convinced some of Pittsburgh's first trolley lines to pass through East Liberty.

East Liberty developed more or less independently of Pittsburgh until the Pennsylvania Railroad opened the East Liberty station in the 1850s. This passenger depot served to connect East Liberty to the city; twenty-six trains transported people to and from downtown on a daily basis. The rail connection was of crucial importance for the area's future development, because Pittsburgh was just about to enter its industrial boom period that would last between the end of the Civil War and World War I. As the city's population swelled to fuel the burgeoning iron and steel industry, East Liberty grew too. The neighborhood's population increased from under 1,000 in 1850 to over 46,000 by 1910. East Liberty acted as a first-ring residential suburb for elite families looking to escape the industrial smoke and soot of the city. By the turn of the century, it was one of the richest suburbs in America, containing many of the wealthy industrialists’ mansions. However, East Liberty was not exclusively an elite, Anglo-American neighborhood. The East Liberty Station brought floods of European immigrants and African American migrants from the South, who were drawn by Pittsburgh's manufacturing and industrial jobs. The neighborhood became home to an impressive number of churches for various religions and ethnicities by the late nineteenth century. There were separate places of worship for German and Italian Protestants, Irish, Italian and German Catholics, as well as a Presbyterian church for Anglo-Americans and an AME church for African Americans. East Liberty's diverse mix of Italian, Anglo-American, German, African-American, Jewish, Polish, Greek, and Irish residents stayed intact until after World War II.

On June 30, 1868, the City of Pittsburgh annexed Collins and Liberty townships, which together included East Liberty. Thanks to its favorable location and Mellon's guiding hand, East Liberty became a thriving commercial center in the following years. East Liberty's merchants served many of Pittsburgh's industrial millionaires, who settled in nearby Shadyside and Point Breeze. Professionals in Highland Park and Friendship and laborers in Bloomfield and Garfield also shopped in East Liberty. There were four movie theaters. Actor-singer Dick Powell got his start singing at the Enright Theater. By 1950, the area was a bustling and fully urban marketplace, anchored by Sears-Roebuck store on Highland Avenue and (Albert J )Mansmann's Department Store on Penn Avenue. It had become the largest, in terms of sales dollars, non-center-city business district in the country.

== Decline ==
East Liberty's decline was precipitated by a series of government policies relating to the underwriting of mortgages for homes commonly referred to as redlining. The residential areas immediately surrounding East Liberty's main business district consisted primarily of tightly packed wood frame homes built in the mid-to-late 1800s. In 1937, The George F Cram Company undertook the creation of federally sponsored surveys and maps which ultimately became the 'redlined' maps used by banks for underwriting. The Cram Maps listed this housing stock as "obsolete," noted the "infiltration of Jews... and Negroes", and the large number of people on relief (the New Deal version of Welfare) as justification for redlining the area. The result of this redlining was two-fold; first, it made accessing conventional forms of credit for home purchases and renovations difficult; and second, it fostered segregation of low income minorities in a neighborhood that was clearly racially diverse in 1937.

Because most real estate is purchased with a mortgage, and banks would not lend against properties in redlined areas, most prospective buyers could not buy homes in the area at competitive prices, causing an artificial collapse of demand and property value. Without capital to fund repairs and renovations, homes in poor repair deteriorated over time. Indeed, when urban renewal's blight remediation via demolition was undertaken in the 1960s, the areas redlined in 1937 were those designated as blighted, and razed.

The residential neighborhoods north of the redlined areas were not immune to the impact of redlining. The larger brick four-square homes built in the first 20 years of the 20th Century were interspersed with the estates of Pittsburgh's wealthy. However, the George F. Cram surveys noted "...negro encroachment threatening], calling it an obsolete, "...mediocre section of East Liberty."], and designated it as a higher risk for lenders. Though this area of the neighborhood declined in tandem with the greater East Liberty neighborhood, it was spared the greater destruction of Urban Renewal.

Two decisions in the 1960s exacerbated the trends begun with redlining. The first was an attempt to halt a slow trickle of businesses from the City to the suburbs. In the early 1960s, a few of East Liberty's larger merchants saw that some residents of Pittsburgh's East End were moving to the suburbs, and that suburban shopping malls were consequently growing and expanding. These merchants feared that suburban development would harm East Liberty's status as a market center, and asked the City of Pittsburgh's Urban Redevelopment Authority (URA) to take action.

The URA proposed creating an outdoor pedestrian mall on Penn Avenue, to be surrounded by car-friendly roads on which large stores, surrounded by parking lots, could serve shoppers just as the new suburban stores were doing. This plan required the demolition of roughly half of the 254 ac (103 ha) that comprised East Liberty. As noted previously, the area targeted for demolition roughly aligned with those parts of the neighborhood redlined in 1937. After some contentious debate, the plan was approved, and the URA stopped traffic on the busiest part of Penn Avenue (the old Greensburg-Pittsburgh turnpike of Jacob Negley's day) and routed it onto a series of new, one-way thoroughfares (called Penn Circle) that formed a ring around the central business district.

Many small shops were destroyed—a million square feet of retail space in all. These demolitions destroyed the dense, walkable commercial district and replaced much of it with unattractive parking lots and vacant properties, hastening the decline of the businesses that remained.

While the URA was remaking the street plan of East Liberty, the City of Pittsburgh's housing authority made a second set of changes to the neighborhood. Housing authority planners noted that the nearby African-American neighborhood of Homewood was overcrowded, largely as a result of the URA's earlier demolition of the lower Hill District to create the Civic Arena, which had forced many of the Hill's African-Americans out and into the North Side and Homewood. The housing authority's solution was to build three large housing complexes, each close to 20 stories tall, in East Liberty along the new Penn Circle roads.

These two measures ultimately failed to preserve East Liberty as a market center, and arguably hastened the old neighborhood's demise. By routing cars away from Penn Avenue, the URA's new street plan seemed to send a message that the neighborhood's commercial center was not worth visiting. The housing authority's massive housing complexes quickly developed a reputation as centers for crime, and this reputation likely did as much as the confusing street plan to drive commerce away from East Liberty. Redlining had already driven away middle class homebuyers, and the public housing complexes were exclusively for low-income renters. This created population demographics that were severely poor and unable to support a healthy commercial sector.

Urban renewal had devastating consequences for the neighborhood. There were some 575 businesses in East Liberty in 1959 but only 292 in 1970 and just 98 in 1979. The businesses that remained tended not to serve the majority of nearby Pittsburghers, but only the captive audience that remained in what was now an urban ghetto.

Steep population decline followed urban renewal. East Liberty became a segregated neighborhood with high poverty rates, low rates of homeownership, and a legacy of disinvestment that continued well after the Community Reinvestment Act eliminated redlining. In the past 20 years, the population fell from 7,973 in 1990 to 6,871 in 2000, and 5,698 in 2016. The reason for this is both the lingering effects of urban renewal and redlining. A 2018 study of demographic changes in East Liberty suggests that abandonment due to poor property condition drove the bulk of population change in East Liberty. Evidence of previous widespread abandonment exists both in the form of vacant lots which once held homes and in the presence of new homes and apartments built on previously vacant lots.

== Renewed growth ==
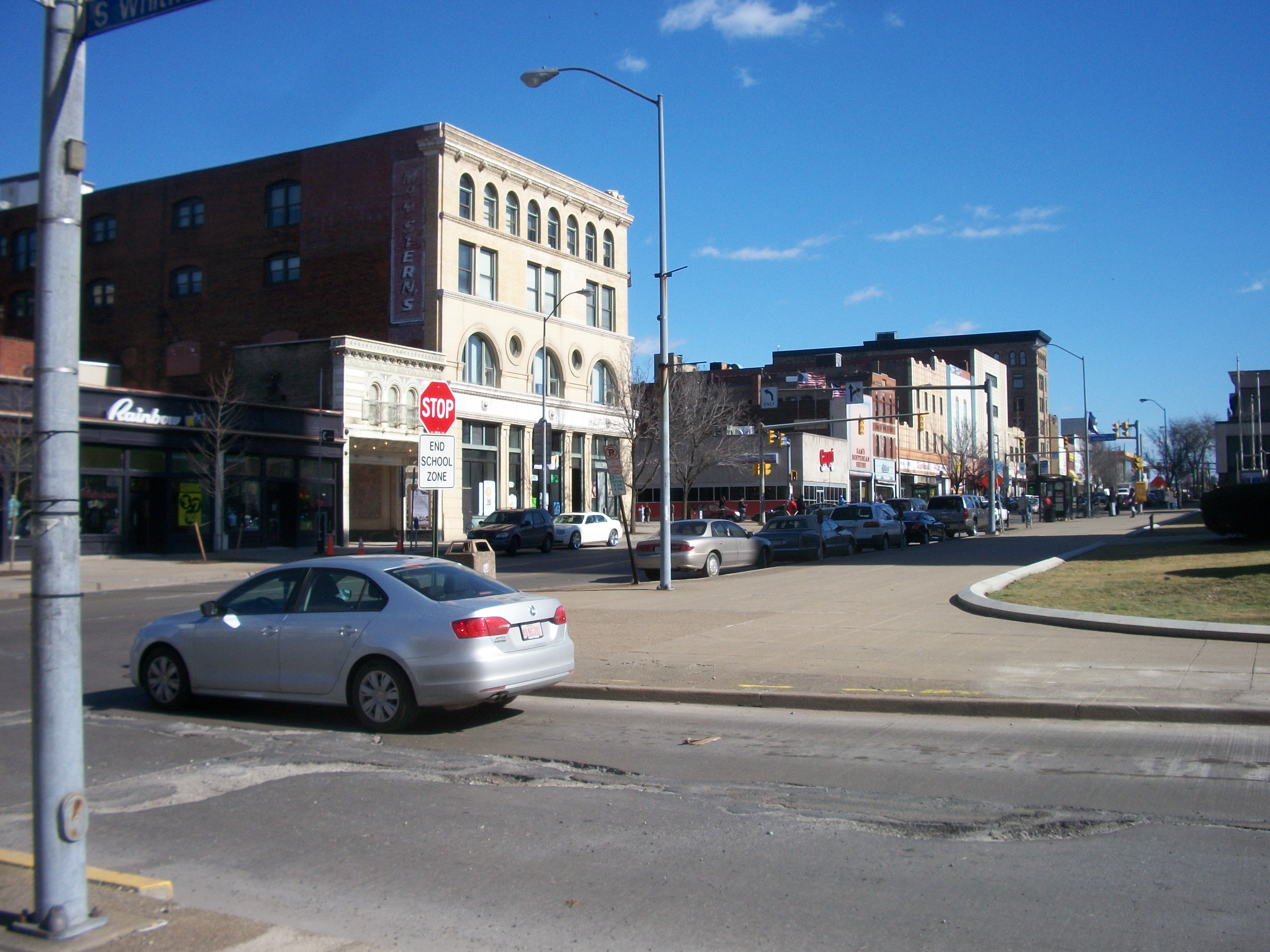
East Liberty business district along Penn Avenue.

In the three decades following 1980, East Liberty has slowly regained its status as a market destination for shoppers.

In 1979, Mellon Bank, Pittsburgh National Bank, local property owners and other businesses created a nonprofit community development corporation, East Liberty Development, Inc. (ELDI). and hired an executive director, David Feehan. During the 1980s, a number of important developments occurred, spearheaded by ELDI, which acquired and renovated a vacant hotel (now 100 Sheridan Square); purchased the block that included the Regent Theater and Penn Highland Building; and worked with developers to bring the first market rate condo to the community and a new shopping center called East Liberty Station on Penn Avenue, east of Penn Circle. During the 1980s, the collection of small shops on Penn Circle South expanded, more than 200 businesses located in East Liberty, and more than $80 million was invested in real estate development. In the fifteen years following its founding, ELDI focused on rehabilitating some of the East Liberty's historic commercial spaces. These included the Regent Theater (now called the Kelly-Strayhorn Theater) and Motor Square Garden.

ELDI's rehabilitation projects were time-consuming, and they did not make the neighborhood the destination for shoppers that it had formerly been. For example, ELDI and the Massaro Corporation recreated the Motor Square Garden building as an indoor mall in 1988, but consumers did not respond. The American Automobile Association bought the building in bankruptcy court in 1991 and now uses it as office space.

In addition to its moderately successful property rehabilitation efforts during the 1980s, ELDI was able to remove the failed pedestrian mall on Penn Avenue and return that thoroughfare to its traditional use as a two-way street. These successes set the stage for a large and somewhat controversial series of developments in the late 1990s and 2000s.

Between 1996 and 2006, ELDI and the City of Pittsburgh worked to attract new “big box” retailers to East Liberty and to remove the 20-story housing projects that surrounded the neighborhood. First, ELDI and the City used tax increment financing to lure two national retailers to the neighborhood: Home Depot and Whole Foods. Both of these stores thrived, and their success convinced small local merchants and other national retailers to invest in the neighborhood. Second, after a complex and time-consuming set of transactions, two of the three housing projects that visually barricaded the neighborhood were demolished in 2005, and the third was demolished in May 2009.

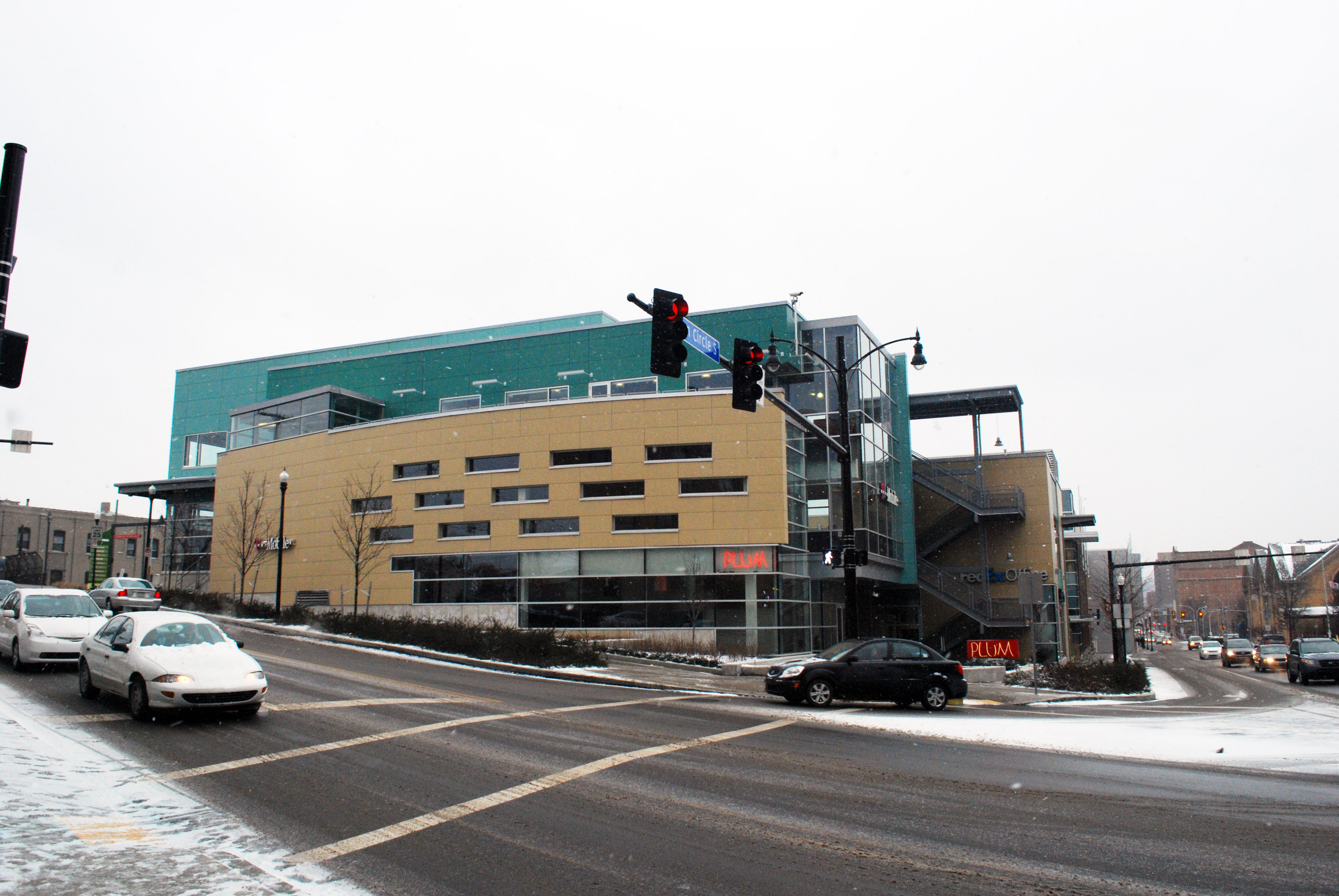
The EastSide development in East Liberty.

Because these efforts involved resettling the largely African-American population of East Liberty's housing projects and attracting several high-end retailers, ELDI and the City have been criticized for acting as agents of Gentrification. Some of these concerns have been assuaged by new mixed-income residential developments which have begun to replace the demolished housing projects, as the new developments provide arguably nicer and safer accommodations for some of the projects’ former residents - but much fewer of them.

By 2009, East Liberty more closely resembled the busy commercial neighborhood of 1959 than the struggling ghetto of 1979. Merchants continue to invest in the neighborhood, and outside observers consider it to be fully rehabilitated.

In 2010, The New York Times published an article about the revival of East Liberty, and cited the presence of a Google office as a sign of the neighborhood's success.

In 2011, the Pittsburgh Post-Gazette published an article entitled "The trend toward shared working areas arrives" which describes the creation of The Beauty Shoppe, East Liberty's first Coworking space. The space is owned by East Liberty Development Inc and currently houses several start ups and small businesses. The first business tenant was Thinktiv, Inc., a venture accelerator. Thinktiv was part of The Beauty Shoppe redevelopment effort alongside East Liberty Development Inc. and Edile, a real estate development firm.

The Highland Building hi-rise, vacant for 20 years, has been converted into luxurious apartments, as has the adjacent Wallace Building, through Walnut Capital, a local real estate company that also owns part of Bakery Square.

In April 2014, the streets making up Penn Circle were renamed, removing a highly visible reminder of the failed urban renewal plans of the 1960s. Several historic street names were restored, and Centre Avenue was extended beyond its original (pre-1968) terminus at Penn Avenue to East Liberty Boulevard, affording visitors to the neighborhood a less confusing path toward the business district. A decade-long effort to convert the streets from one-way back to two-way was finished in 2024.

In June 2014, USA Today named East Liberty one of the ten best up and coming neighborhoods around the USA.

== Transportation ==
East Liberty is served by the East Liberty station, also called the East Liberty Transit Center, on the Martin Luther King Jr. East Busway. This station was redeveloped in 2015. The publicly funded project aimed at transit-oriented development, placing residents and retail in close proximity to mass transit in order to encourage urban density and discourage automobile use. The transit center increases accessibility to the Martin Luther King Jr. East Busway that runs along the ravine where the Pennsylvania Railroad once ran. The busway connects Downtown with East End neighborhoods and eastern suburbs of Allegheny County. This $150 million project covers a total of 6 acres and added 3000 square feet of mixed-use commercial space.

This project has been a catalyst for heated debates in the past three years about the lack of affordable housing in East Liberty. The project's tax abatement program, which is meant to encourage development in the East Liberty transit district, has resulted in public funds being granted to private developers for high-end development, including hundreds of luxury apartments.

== Culture ==
In 2009, the Remnant Choir from East Liberty's Mt. Ararat Baptist Church won second place, and $20,000 in prize money, in a national contest that was sponsored by Verizon Wireless, and was designed to find the "Best Church Choir in America."

Legendary actor and dancer Gene Kelly was born in East Liberty in 1912.

David Tepper, a business man, owner of the NFL's Carolina Panthers and the MLS's Charlotte FC lived in East Liberty.

== See also ==
- List of Pittsburgh neighborhoods

== Gallery ==
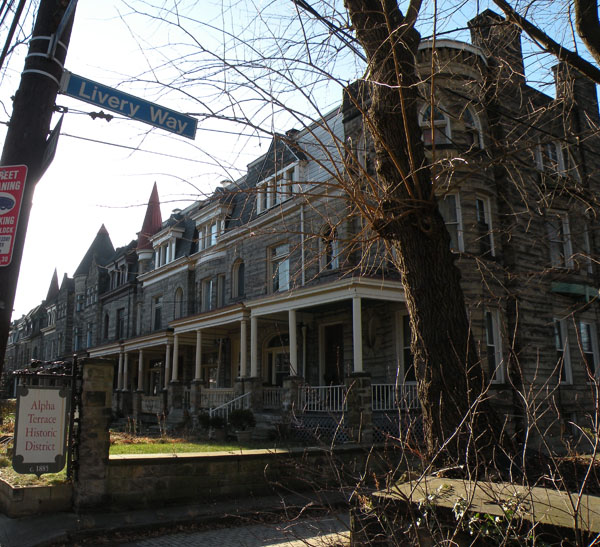
Alpha Terrace Historic District, built circa 1885, located at 716–740 and 721–743 North Beatty Street.

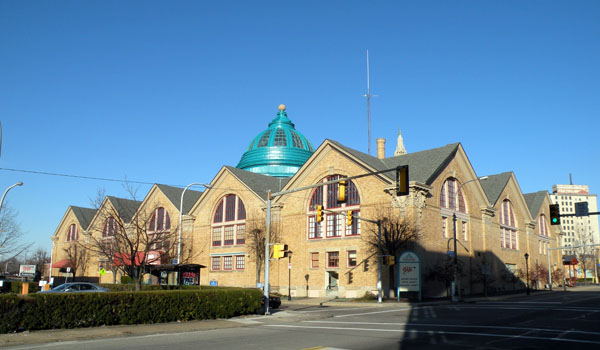
East Liberty Market (also known as Motor Square Garden), built from 1898 to 1900 by Pittsburgh banker Andrew Mellon, at 5900 Baum Boulevard.

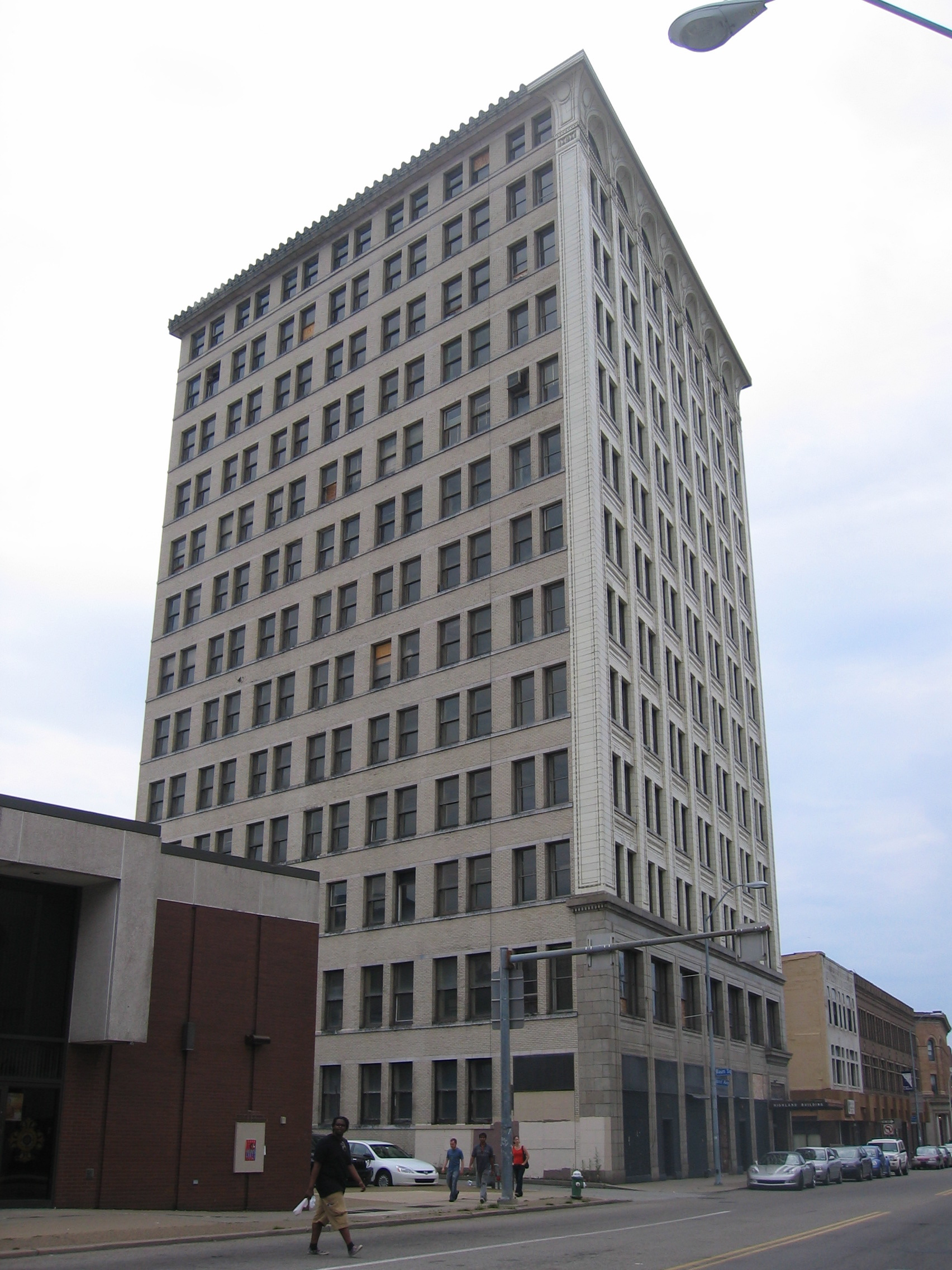
Highland Building, built in 1909 by Pittsburgh industrialist Henry Frick, with Chicago's famed Daniel Burnham as architect, at 121 South Highland Avenue.

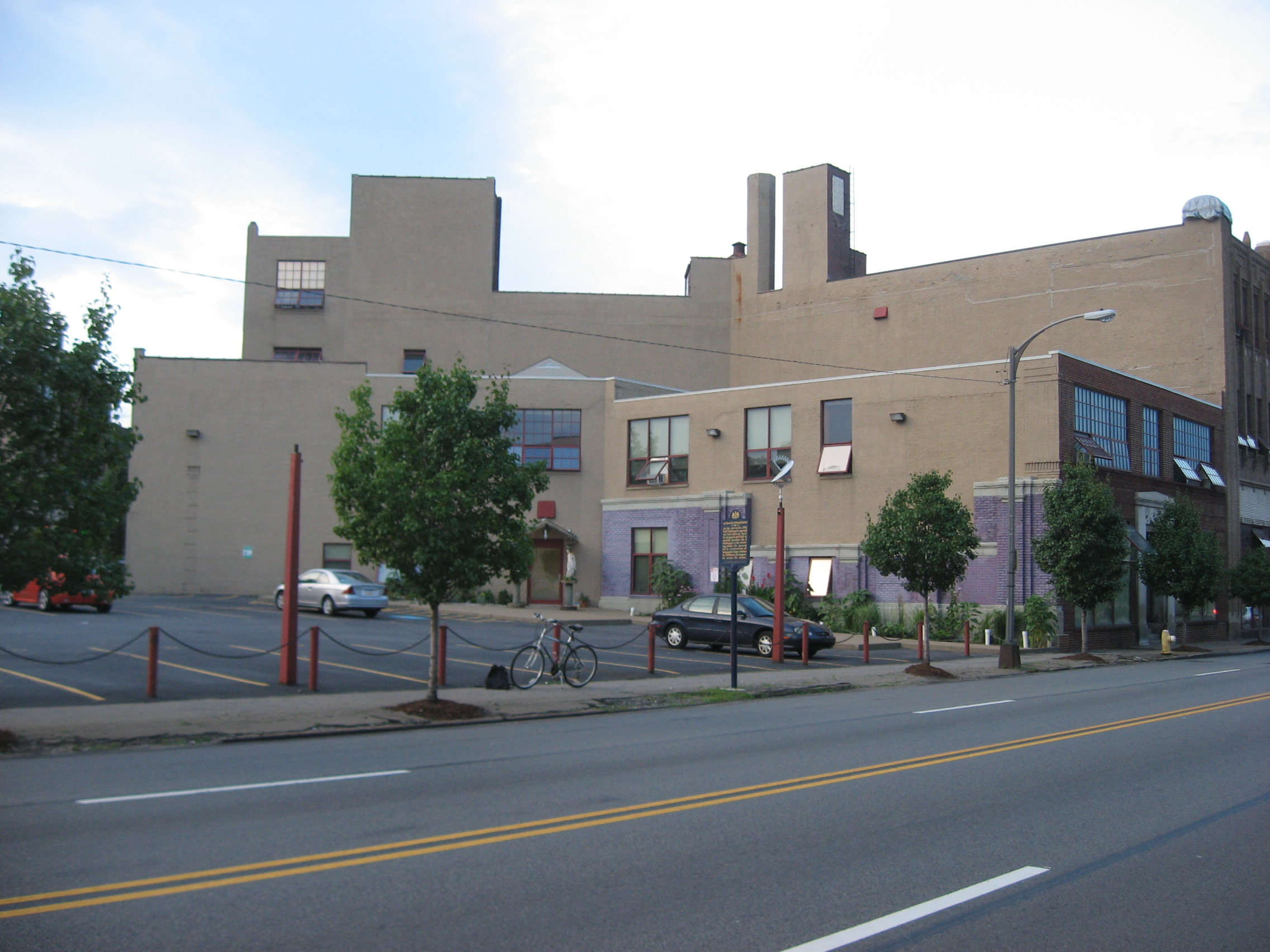
Whitehill-Gleason Motors (built circa 1920s), on the site of the first Drive-In Filling Station (1913), at Baum and St. Clair Streets (5815 Baum Boulevard).

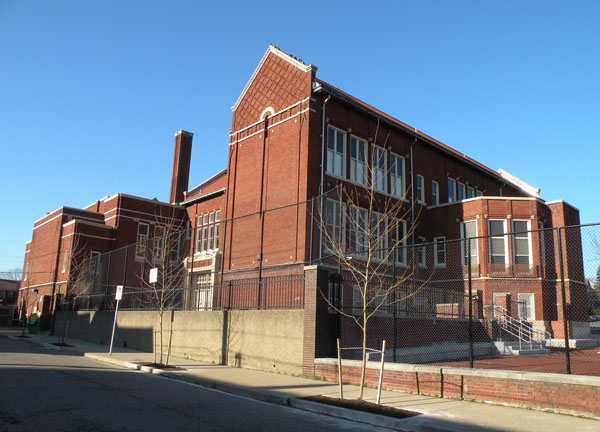
Dilworth Elementary School, a historic landmark built in 1915, located at 6200 Stanton Avenue.

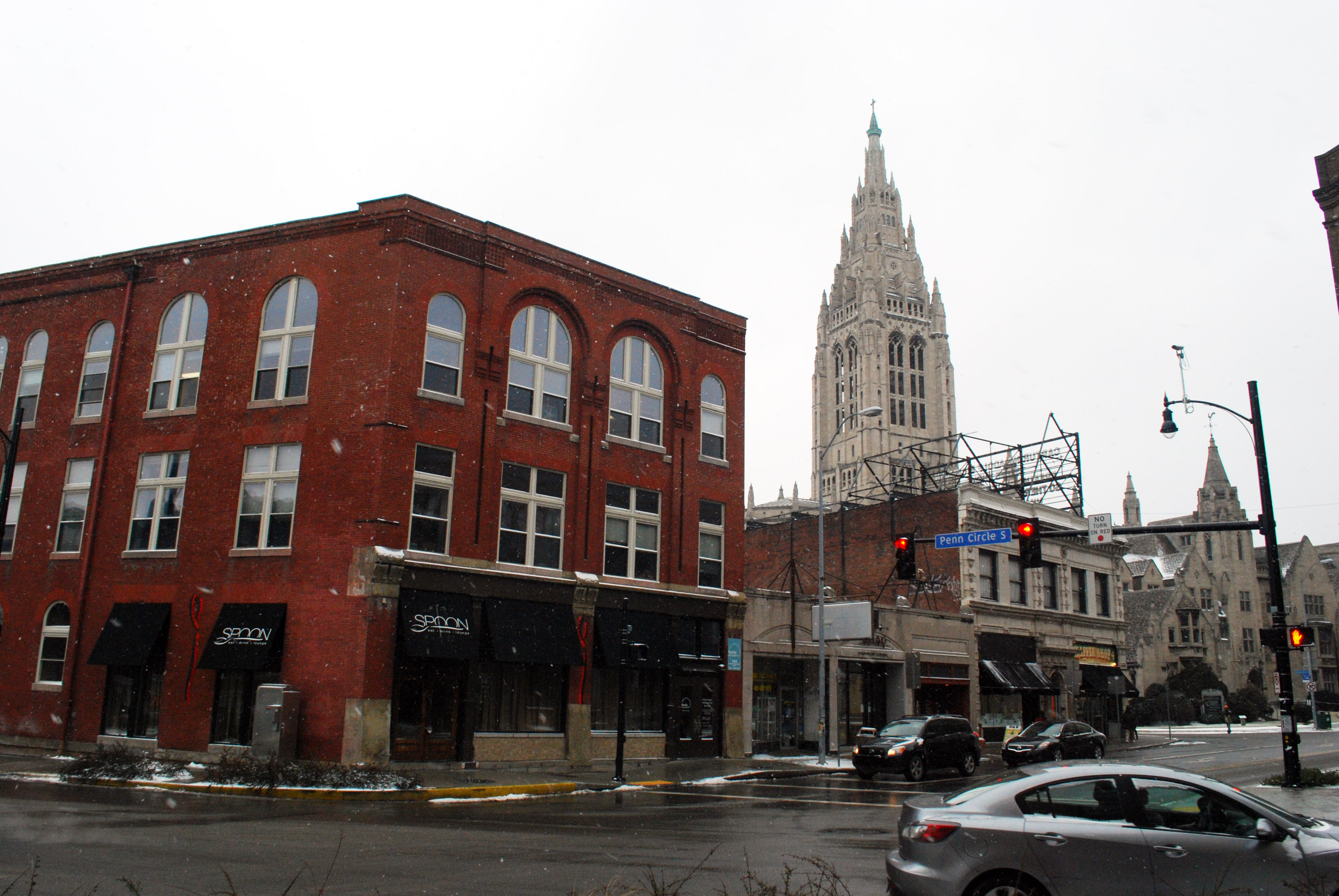
New restaurants near Centre Ave with East Liberty Presbyterian Church in background.

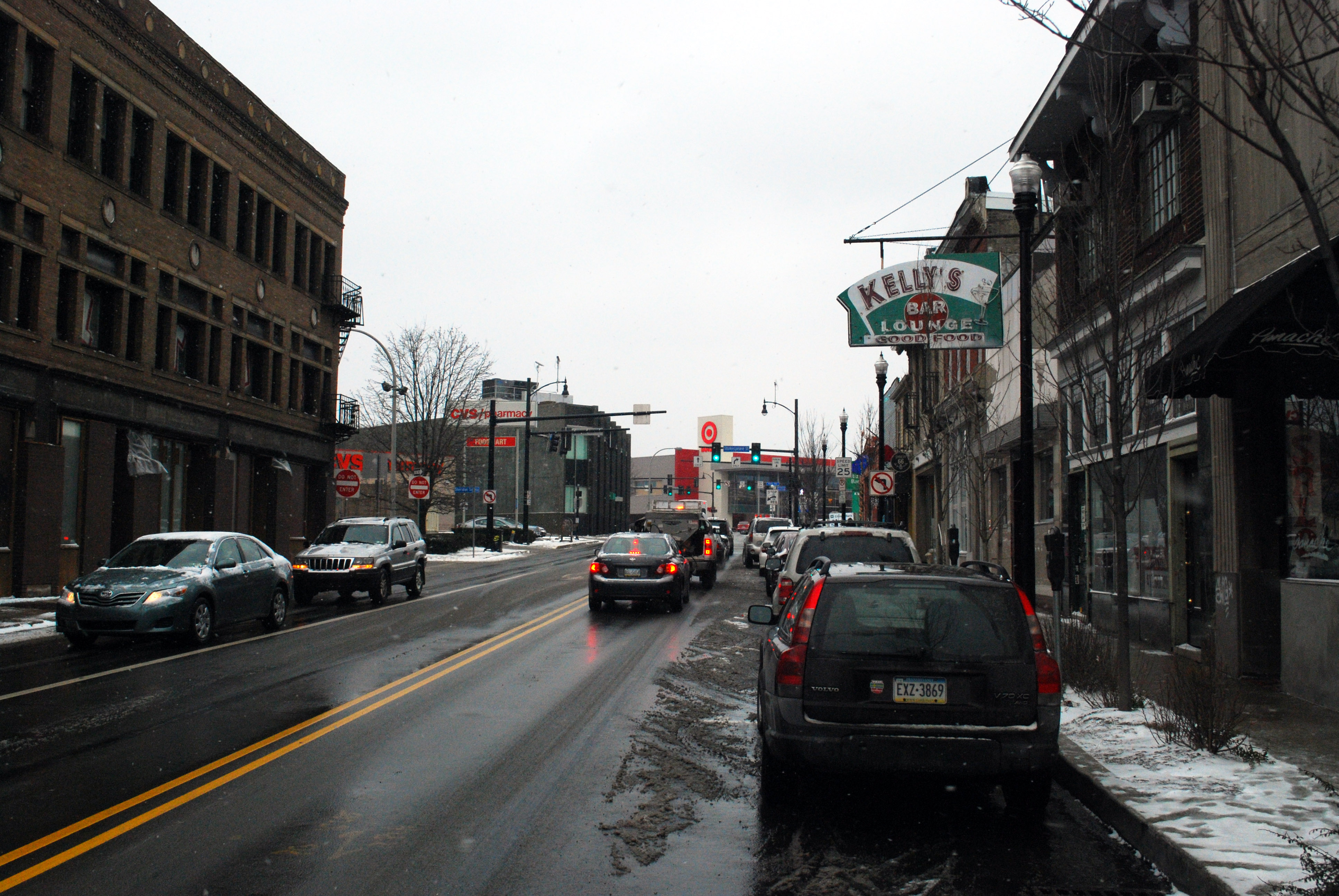
A Target retail store contrasted by small shops and eateries on Centre Ave.
