= Gleason (given name) =

Gleason is a masculine given name borne by:

- Gleason Archer Sr. (1880–1966), founder and first president of Suffolk University and Suffolk Law School in Boston, Massachusetts, writer and radio broadcaster
- Gleason Archer Jr. (1916–2004), American biblical scholar, theologian, educator and author, son of the above
- Gleason Belzile (1898–1950), Canadian politician
- Gleason Fournier (born 1991), Canadian ice hockey player
