= Gleidson Saturnino =

Brazilian futsal player

Personal information
- Full name: Gleidson Gomes Saturnino
- Date of birth: 11 April 1997 (age 29)
- Place of birth: Brazil
- Height: 1.70 m (5 ft 7 in)
- Position: Defender

Team information
- Current team: Sorocaba
- Number: 8

Youth career
- –2013: São Paulo
- 2014–2016: Corinthians

Senior career*
Years	Team	Apps	(Gls)
2016–2018	Corinthians	36	(3)
2019–	Sorocaba		

International career
2018–	Brazil		
- * Club domestic league appearances and goals as of 00:00, 9 March 2019 (UTC)

Gleidson Gomes Saturnino (born 11 April 1997) is a Brazilian futsal player who plays for Sorocaba and the Brazilian national futsal team as a defender.
