= James Gleason Cottage =

Historic house in Massachusetts, United States

- U.S. National Register of Historic Places
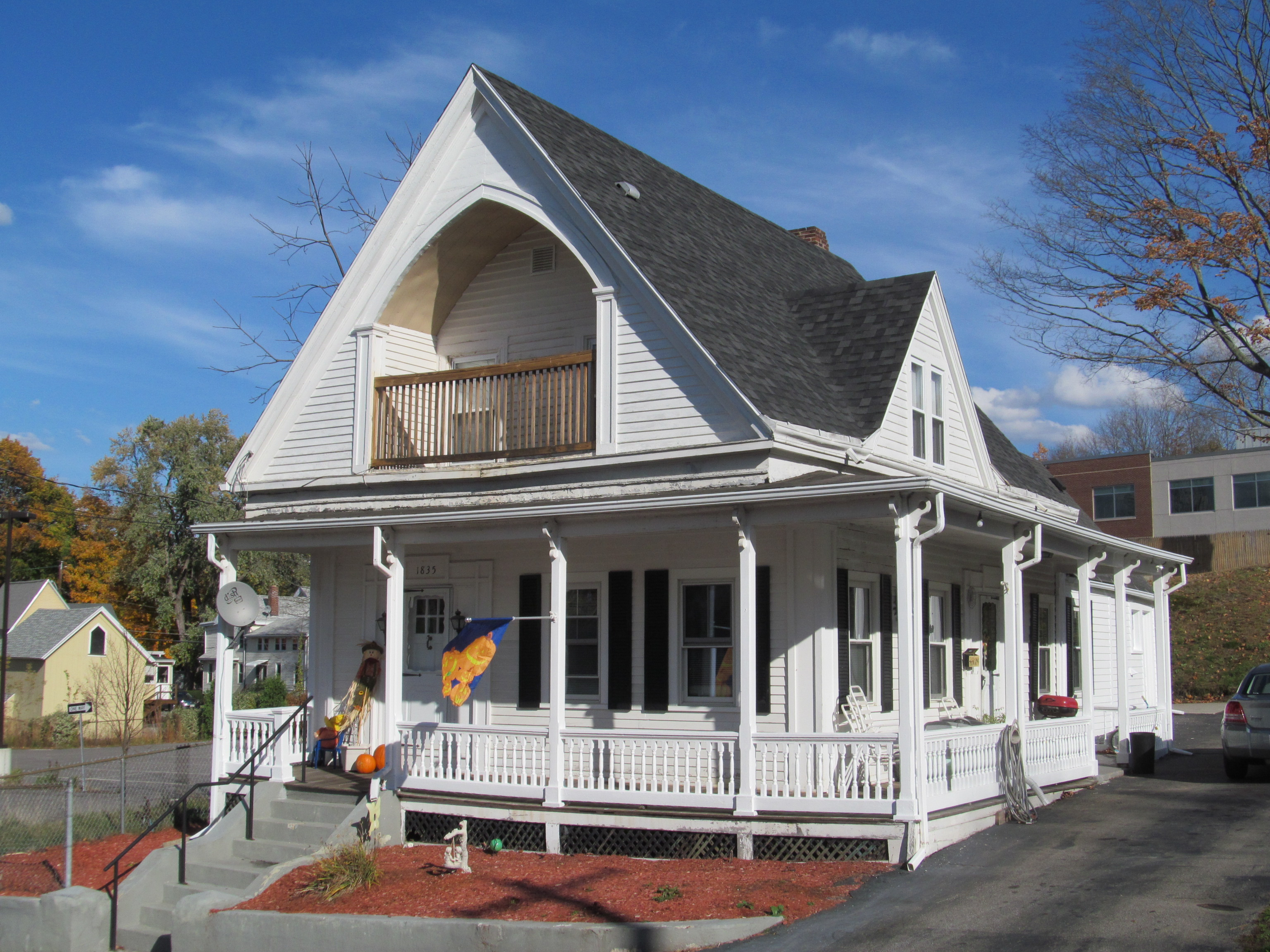

- Location within Massachusetts Location within the United States
- Location: 31 Sayles St., Southbridge, Massachusetts
- Coordinates: 42°4′45″N 72°2′37″W
- Area: less than one acre
- Built: 1830
- Architectural style: Greek Revival, Gothic
- MPS: Southbridge MRA
- NRHP reference No.: 89000533
- Added to NRHP: June 22, 1989

The James Gleason Cottage is a historic house at 31 Sayles Street in Southbridge, Massachusetts. Built about 1830 for a local businessman, it is a regionally rare example of vernacular Gothic Revival architecture. The house was listed on the National Register of Historic Places in 1989.

== Description and history ==
The James Gleason Cottage is located in Southbridge's Globe Village area, on the east side of Sayles Street near Ash Street. The house is a modest 1 1/2-story wood-frame structure with a steeply pitched gabled roof and clapboarded exterior. The main facade is three bays wide in the Greek Revival style, with corner pilasters and a pilastered entry in the left bay. A single-story porch extends across the front and right side, with bracketed square posts and turned balustrade. The front gable features a large recessed porch, its top consisting of an open Gothic arch. The right side has a gabled wall dormer projecting from the roof, and an ell extends to the rear.

The house is a rare regional example of a residential house with Greek Revival and Gothic Revival features. It was built c. 1830, probably for James Gleason, an owner of a successful grocery business in Globe Village. It was originally located nearer the corner of Main and Sayles Street, and was moved to its present location about 1900. It is now largely surrounded by parking lots of the adjacent medical center.

== See also ==
- National Register of Historic Places listings in Southbridge, Massachusetts
- National Register of Historic Places listings in Worcester County, Massachusetts
