= Paul Gleeson (magician) =

Irish magician

Paul Gleeson or Rua (born 7 December 1987) is an Irish TV magician, mentalist and escapologist, described by The Times as one of Ireland's leading professional magicians.

== Early life ==
Born in Monkstown, Dublin, Ireland, Rua developed his interest in magic at the age of 18. He had previously worked as a fire performer, and after a freak accident suffered second- and third-degree burns to his hands, face and chest. While he was in hospital, he was given a book on card tricks by a friend, through which he developed his interest in sleight of hand. Rua holds a BA Honours Degree in Communication Studies, and a master's degree in Film and Television Studies from Dublin City University.

Rua's television career began in 2012 when he started filming his debut series Draíocht for Irish national broadcaster TG4, with Midas Productions, the company that was originally behind Irish Hypnotist Keith Keith Barry's debut TV series in 2003. This 10-part series was the first Irish-language magic series to be broadcast in Ireland, and the first Irish television series that featured an escapologist. Rua has also been featured heavily in the Irish Media, performing on RTE's The Saturday Night Show, and 'Today', as well as TwoTube, Swipe, Elev8 and The Dig in Diner. TV3's Ireland AM the BBCNI's I Lár an Aonaigh and TG4's Cluiche Thart. In 2016, Rua was featured on Ireland's biggest afternoon show, RTE's Today Live. In April 2017, Rua made his debut appearance on the world's second longest running talk show, and Ireland's most watched programme, RTE's The Late Late Show.

In 2021, Rua was a featured act on The Big Deal, a variety talent competition co-produced by Fox Alternative Entertainment and Virgin Media Television, hosted by Vogue Williams and judged by Boy George, Deirdre O'Kane, Aston Merrygold, Jedward and Lyra. He progressed through to the show's semi-final round.

Rua has also appeared on TV3's Ireland AM, demonstrating mentalism techniques on presenter Simon Delaney.

== Curator ==
Rua was the co-curator and researcher for Dublin's Science Gallery 2013 Exhibition, 'ILLUSION', with Richard Wiseman, who was the primary curator with Michael John Gorman. This exhibition explored the neuroscience of magic and illusion. This exhibition is now touring globally as Science Gallery's most successful exhibition to date.

Rua was also the Lead Consultant for Dublin's World of Illusion museum, where he was responsible for selecting the exhibits and installations featured and coordinated with the artists who created them.

== Live shows ==
In 2013 and 2015, Rua had two successful runs of one-man shows in the Dublin Fringe Festival titled Of Rogues And Knaves. and "Secrets For Sale". Both shows explored the techniques of con-artists, pick – pockets, psychics and card cheats. The Irish Theatre Magazine wrote: "Gleeson has established himself as a master in the dying, though still fascinating craft of live deception."

During the summers of 2013, 2014, and 2015 he performed on stage at one of Europe's largest outdoor festivals, the Electric Picnic, as well as the somewhat smaller "Body and Soul Festival".
