= William A. Gleason =

American academic

- Education: Amherst College; University of California, Los Angeles
- Occupation: Academic
- Employer: Princeton University

William A. Gleason is an American academic. He is the Hughes-Rogers Professor of English and American Studies and former chair of the English department at Princeton University.

He received his PhD from the University of California, Los Angeles, in 1993. He specializes in American literature and culture. He wrote The Leisure Ethic: Work and Play in American Literature, 1840-1940 (Stanford University Press, 1999) and Sites Unseen: Architecture, Race, and American Literature (New York University Press, 2011), the latter of which was a runner-up for the 2012 John Hope Franklin Publication Prize from the American Studies Association. He co-edited The Pocket Instructor: Literature (Princeton University Press, 2015) with Diana Fuss, Keywords for Environmental Studies (New York University Press, 2016) with Joni Adamson and David Pellow, and Romance Fiction and American Culture (Ashgate, 2016) with Eric Murphy Selinger.
