= Urban Redevelopment Authority of Pittsburgh =

Urban Redevelopment Authority of Pittsburgh (URA)
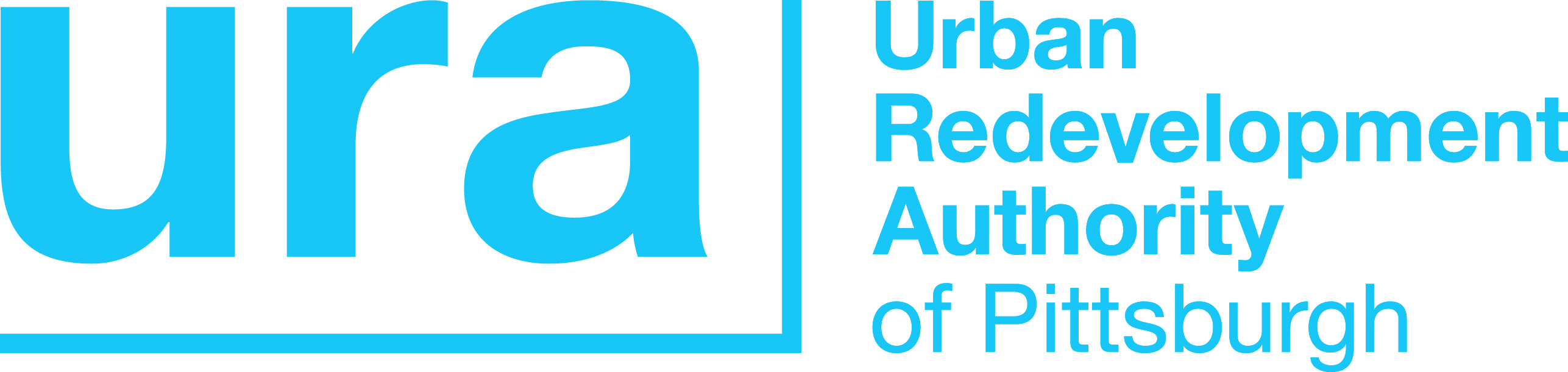

Agency overview
- Formed: 1946
- Jurisdiction: City of Pittsburgh
- Headquarters: 412 Boulevard of the Allies, Suite 900; Pittsburgh, Pennsylvania; 40°26′14.0136″N 79°59′58.938″W
- Agency executive: Susheela Nemani-Stanger, Executive Director; Kyle Chintalapalli, Chairman
- Website: www.ura.org

The Urban Redevelopment Authority of Pittsburgh (URA) is the City of Pittsburgh's economic development enterprise, committed to building a prosperous and equitable economy for the City. The URA helps bridge public and private interests to invest in financially viable equitable developments that promote housing affordability, economic mobility, entrepreneurship and neighborhood revitalization. Its work creates and sustains quality jobs, thriving neighborhoods, healthy communities and sustainable businesses for the benefit of all Pittsburghers.

== Impact ==
As of 2015, nearly $3 billion in private investment has been leveraged by $336 million in tax increment financing administered by the URA – a leverage ratio of 9 to 1.

Between 2006 and 2012, the URA:

- Issued 401 loans/grants totaling $580 million with $80 million of URA investment
- Invested $348 million in economic development projects, leveraging over a billion dollars in total project costs
- Leveraged $60 million in tax increment financing (TIF) to create $520 million in total investment
- Initiated $545 million in housing development projects, creating 4,024 housing units with $138 million of URA investment
- Provided $9.4 million in loans and grants to rehabilitate 611 housing units and $20.3 million in mortgage loans for the purchase of 422 housing units
