= James E. Gleason =

American mechanical engineer, entrepreneur and inventor

James Emmet Gleason (November 27, 1869 – February 10, 1964) was an American mechanical engineer, president of the Gleason Corporation, and inventor. He was awarded the ASME Medal in 1939.

Gleason was born in Rochester, New York, son of the Irish immigrant William Gleason (1836-1922), founder of the Gleason Corporation, and Ellen (McDermott) Gleason. He studied mechanical engineering at Cornell University. After his graduation he started his lifelong career at the Gleason Corporation, manufacturer of precision machine tools. He was president from 1922 to 1947, and until his death chairman of the board. He served as president of the National Machine Tool Builders Association. He was the brother of pioneering female engineer and businesswoman Kate Gleason.

== Selected publications ==
- Patent Patent US1236834 - Gear-cutter, 1915-17.
- Patent US 1236836 A - Gear-generator, 1917.
- Patent Patent US1372340 - Gear-cutting machine, 1917-21.
- Patent Patent US1612371 - Apparatus for finishing curved-tooth gears, 1926.
- Patent Method and apparatus for making gears - US 1660502 A, 1928.
