= Mary J. L. Gleason =

Canadian judge

Mary J.L. Gleason is a Canadian judge. Gleason was appointed as a justice of the Federal Court of Appeal in 2015. Prior to her appointment she was a senior partner with Norton Rose in Ottawa, Ontario.
