= Gleason Corporation =

Company in Rochester, United States

Gleason Corporation is a machine tool builder based in Rochester, New York, US. It has manufacturing plants in the US, Germany, Switzerland, China, Japan, and India as well as sales and service offices in all major industrial hubs globally.

Gleason's expertise lies in gear manufacturing — especially in building the machine tools that themselves cut the teeth. These gears and these machines are sold to industrial customers in a wide variety of fields, such as companies in the automotive and aerospace industries.

== History ==
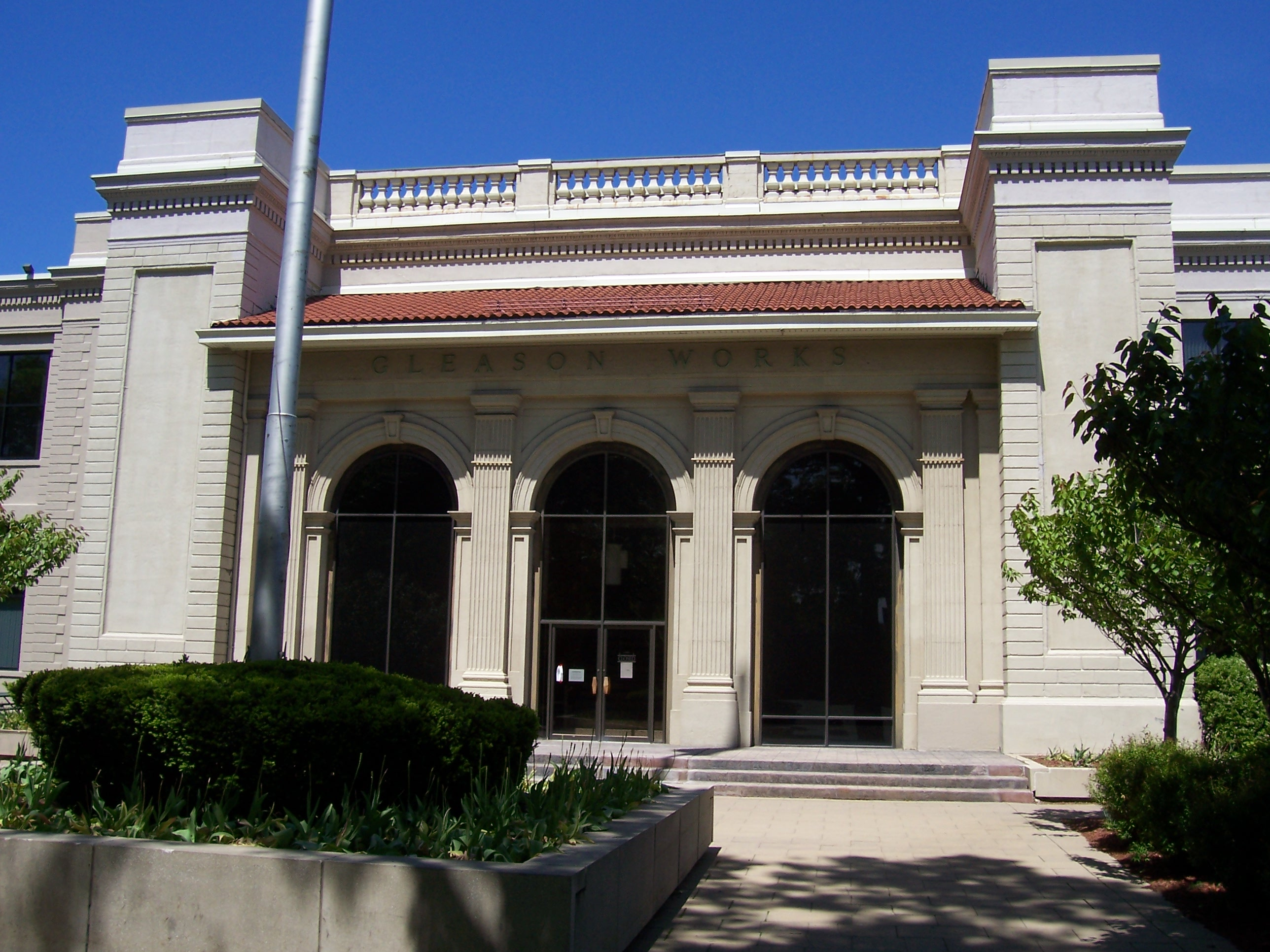
Headquarters in Rochester, New York

The Gleason Works, the machine shop that eventually evolved into the Gleason Corporation, was founded by Irish immigrant William Gleason in 1865 after his previous experience in other machine shops.

An important product came in 1874 with Gleason's invention of the first bevel gear planer, a planer with integral indexing head designed to specialize in planing bevel gears. Planers and indexing heads had been combined before, but never in the winning form factor that Gleason created specifically for gears.

Gleason's sons, James E. and Andrew C. Gleason as well as his daughter Kate Gleason were integral to the company's early success.

After engineers at Packard developed spiral bevel gears, Gleason pioneered the machine tools to mass-produce them (with automotive differentials being the primary market). Packard and Gleason settled an infringement lawsuit regarding Packard's patents (U.S. patent 725,328 and U.S. patent 1,209,682) and Gleason's patent (U.S. patent 1,325,784).

In 1927, Gleason Works again led the innovation in this market, as it was the first machine tool builder to create machine tools to cut hypoid gears (which are an advanced variant of spiral bevel gears).

== Organizational structure ==
Gleason was a publicly traded company under the symbol 'GLE' on the New York Stock Exchange. In December 1999, it agreed to be acquired by its chairman and chief executive, the senior management, the Gleason Foundation, and private equity firm Vestar Capital Partners.

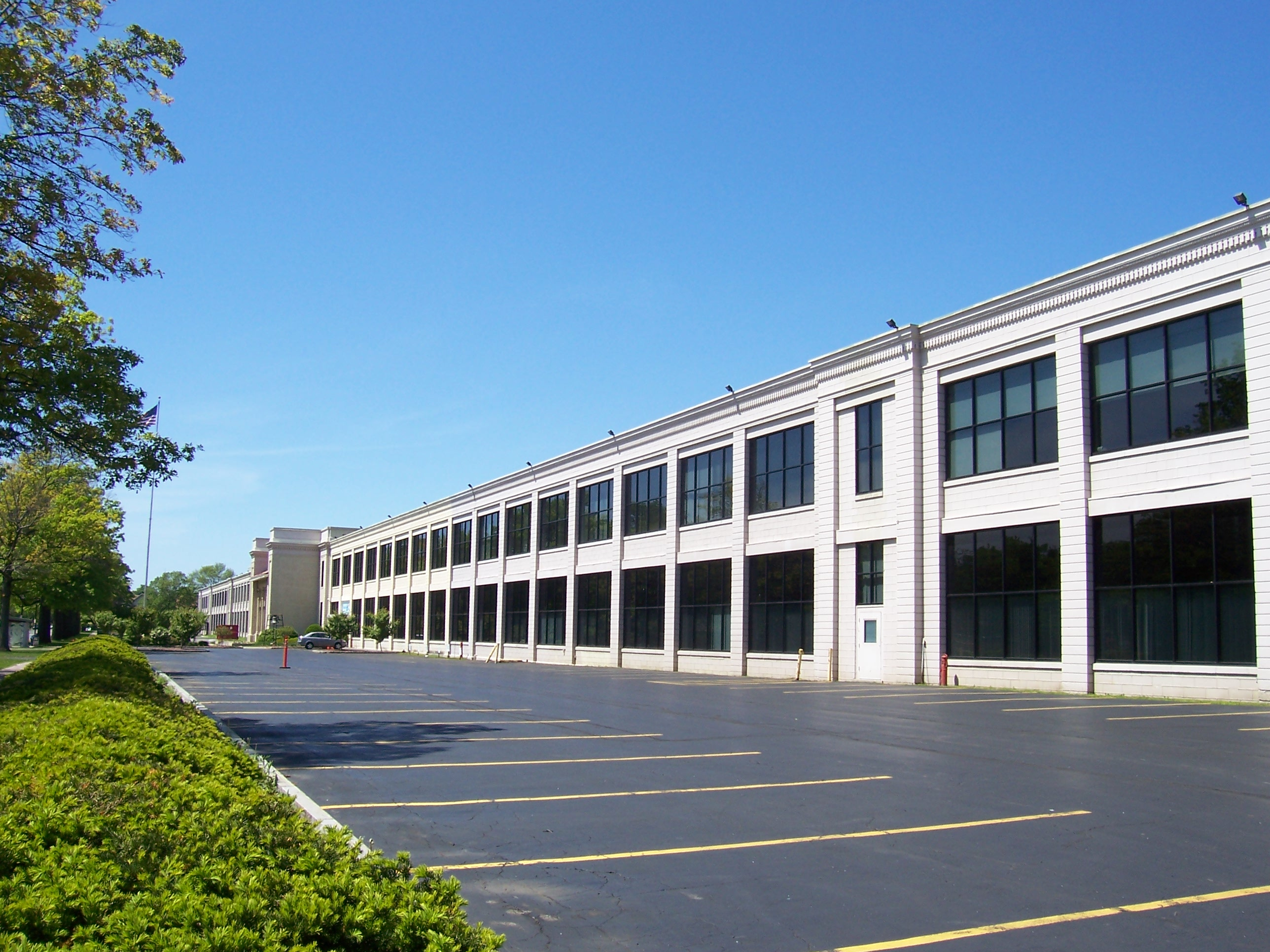
Manufacturing facility in Rochester, New York

There are multiple companies under the Gleason Corporation umbrella:

- The Gleason Works: The original company, located at Rochester, NY.
- Gleason Automation Systems: Formerly Distech Systems, acquired in 2014, located in Rochester, NY.
- Gleason Plastic Gears: Specializing in Precision Plastic Gearing, acquired in 2011, located in Bergen, NY.
- Gleason-Pfauter Maschinenfabrik GmbH: Originally 'Pfauter', based in Ludwigsburg, Germany, acquired by Gleason Corporation in 1997.
- Gleason Cutting Tools GmbH: Originally 'Hurth Maschinen und Werkzeuge GmbH', located in Munich, and IMS Koepfer Tool Operations, located in Eisenbach, Germany, acquired by Gleason Corporation in 1995 and 2014 respectively.
- Gleason Cutting Tools Corporation: Located at Loves Park, Illinois, US
- Gleason Works (India) Private Limited: Located at Bangalore, India.
- Gleason Metrology Systems: A company specializing in Gear Metrology Products, acquired in 2005, based in Dayton, OH.
- Gleason Switzerland AG: Machine tool manufacturing for cylindrical gears based in Studen, Switzerland
- Gleason Gear Technology (Suzhou) Co. Ltd: A 'Wholly Owned Foreign Enterprise' founded by the Gleason Corporation in Jiangsu, China in 2006.
