= William E. Gleason =

American judge (1837–1893)

- Born: 30 November 1837; Baltimore
- Died: 13 June 1893 (aged 55); Brooklyn
- Occupation: Lawyer, judge

William E. Gleason (also spelled Gleeson; November 30, 1837 – June 13, 1893) was a justice of the Dakota Territorial Supreme Court from 1865 to 1866, appointed by Abraham Lincoln on February 16, 1865 to succeed Joseph Lanier Williams. Gleason resigned June 30, 1866, and was replaced by John W. Boyle.

== Early life, education, and career ==
Born in Baltimore, Maryland, Gleason was orphaned at the age of 12. He was employed for a time by the mercantile firm of James Hodges & Brother, owned by James Hodges, and was able to attend Loyola College, where he was "noted for his love of languages", receiving his undergraduate degree in 1856, and a Master of Arts in 1858. He then studied law under James L. Bartol, who was later Chief Justice of Maryland, and served as librarian of the Baltimore Law Library from 1856 to 1859. An ardent supporter of Abraham Lincoln, he made several well-received speeches in support of Lincoln's presidential campaign in 1860.

== Service in the Dakota Territory ==
In 1861, Lincoln appointed Gleason as the first United States Attorney for the Dakota Territory. He was under thirty years of age at the time of his appointment. During his service in this office, Gleason "did not unite with the government and some of the other federal officials in territorial political matters, but became the chief counselor and advisor of General Todd and his friends". In 1865, Gleason was appointed to the territorial supreme court. Historian Doane Robinson noted that Gleason "was a somewhat brilliant lawyer and judge, though, like his predecessors, he did not sit in the supreme court, no case yet having arisen of sufficient moment to warrant an appeal". He was reported to have been "the youngest person ever appointed by the government to a judicial position".

== Diplomatic service and later life ==
Gleason resigned from the court to accept a diplomatic appointment from President Andrew Johnson to serve as a consul, in Bordeaux, France. He was confirmed on June 18, 1866, and departed for the office by steamer from New York City on July 28, 1866.

Robinson further noted that "[a]s a lawyer he was rather unscrupulous in his methods, and after his return [from Europe] he engaged in practice in Baltimore, where he made money, but was finally convicted of perjury and disbarred". In 1880, it was reported that "[e]x-Judge William E. Gleason has been disbarred by the supreme bench of Baltimore. The charge against him was that he purposely misled a judge by assuring him that a certain witness had been summoned which was untrue".

Gleason died in 1893, some years after his return to Baltimore from his consular duties.

Political offices
Preceded by Joseph Lanier Williams	Justice of the Dakota Territory Supreme Court; 1865–1866	Succeeded by John W. Boyle
