= 2018 CR Flamengo season =

Flamengo
2018 season
- President: Eduardo Bandeira de Mello
- Head coach: Paulo César Carpegiani (until 29 March); Mauricio Barbieri (caretaker, 30 March - 18 June); Mauricio Barbieri (19 June - 28 September); Dorival Júnior (from 28 September)
- Stadium: Estádio do Maracanã
- Série A: 2nd
- Campeonato Carioca: 3rd
- Copa do Brasil: Semi-finals
- Copa Libertadores: Round of 16
- Top goalscorer: League: Lucas Paquetá (10 goals); All: Lucas Paquetá & Henrique Dourado (12 goals)
- Highest home attendance: League/All: 66,046 (1 December vs. Atlético-PR)
- Lowest home attendance: League: 33,633 (8 September vs. Chapecoense); All: 4,045 (21 January vs. Cabofriense)
- Average home league attendance: 49,303
Home colours	Away colours	Third colours

The 2018 season was Clube de Regatas do Flamengo's 123rd year of existence, their 107th football season, and their 48th in the Brazilian Série A, having never been relegated from the top division.

The club will participate in the Brazilian Série A, the 2018 Campeonato Carioca (the Rio de Janeiro State League), Copa do Brasil and the CONMEBOL Copa Libertadores.

For the first time since 2010 Flamengo advanced past the Copa Libertadores group stage but were eliminated in the round of 16 by Cruzeiro. Flamengo finished runner-up in the Brasileirão behind Palmeiras after leading the league for much of the first half of the season before the league's pause during the 2018 FIFA World Cup.

== Kits ==
Flamengo unveiled their 2018-2019 home kit ahead of their first match of the 2018 Brasileirão season against Vitória. Flamengo renewed their outfit partnership with Adidas, originally signed in 2013. They unveiled their new white away kit ahead of their 31 May match against Bahia.

Adidas unveiled Flamengo's third kit for the 2018-2019 season on 23 July. It is part of Adidas' line of kits produced from recycled plastic, and its blue color is an allusion to the beaches of Rio de Janeiro.

Supplier: Adidas / Sponsor: Caixa / Back of the shirt: MRV / Lower back: Descomplica / Shoulder: Universidade Brasil / Sleeves: Carabao / Numbers: TIM / Socks: Kodilar

Home	Home alternate	Away	Away alternate	Third	Goalkeeper	Goalkeeper alternate

Last updated: 3 August 2018.
Source: ESPN.br

== Season overview ==
=== Pre-season ===
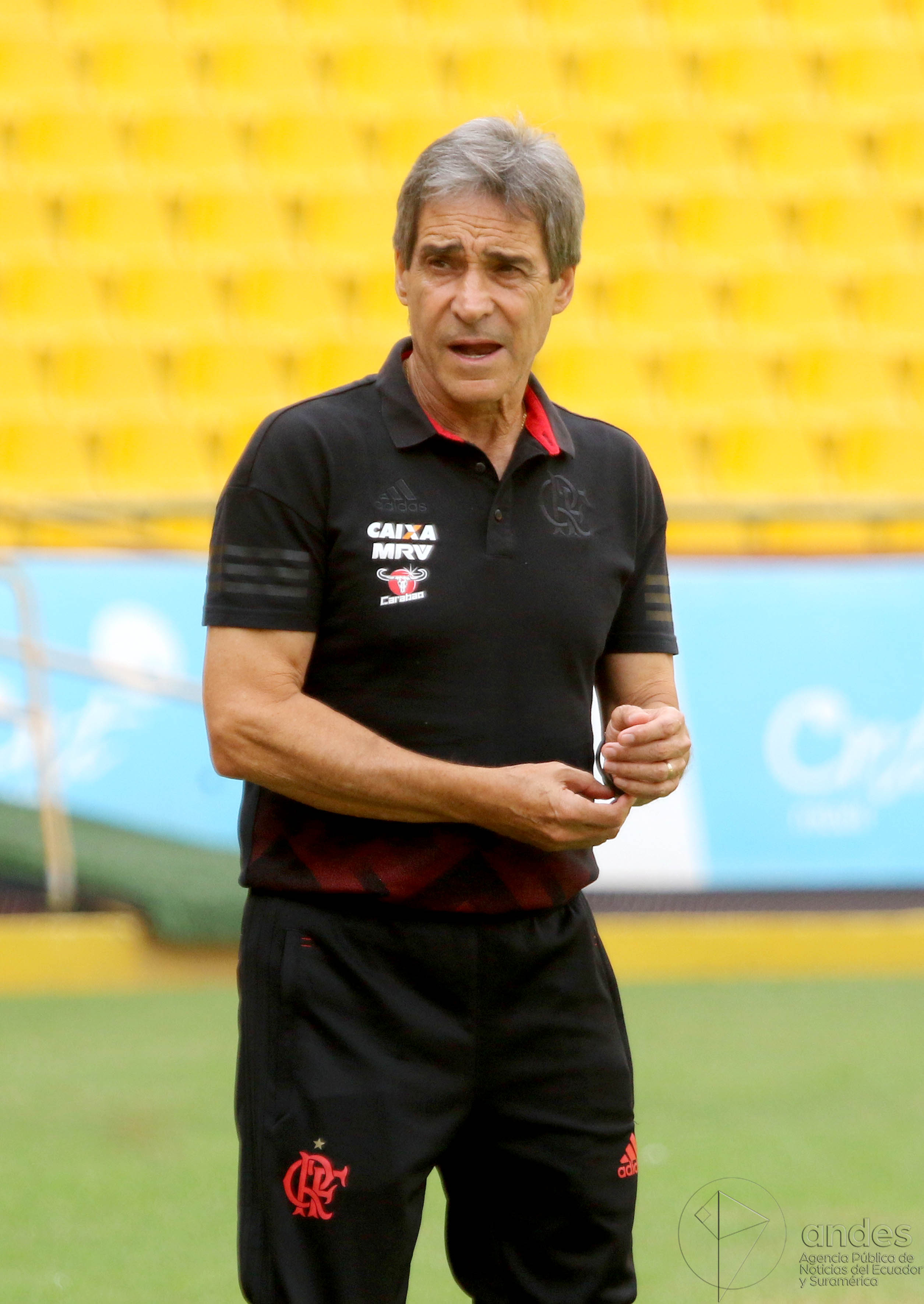
Paulo César Carpegiani managing Flamengo in 2018

Flamengo finished 6th in the 2017 Brasileirão and therefore qualified directly to the 2018 Copa Libertadores group stage and the 2018 Copa do Brasil round of 16.

On 8 January it was made official that head coach Reinaldo Rueda would be leaving Flamengo to manage the Chile national team (who had failed to qualify for the 2018 FIFA World Cup). Ruelda took Flamengo to the finals of the 2017 Copa Sudamericana and the Copa do Brasil, failing to win either. Under him, promising youth academy players Vinícius Júnior and Lucas Paquetá were given opportunities to play larger roles for the club. At the time of the announcement, Flamengo had already come to an agreement with coach Paulo César Carpegiani, manager of Flamengo for their 1981 Copa Libertadores and world championship season. This would be his third spell at Flamengo. The possibility of Ruelda leaving and Carpegiani coming in were already presumed in December.

The first player to depart Flamengo in 2018 was Márcio Araújo, one of the longest-serving players currently on the squad. He arrived in 2014 and had played 219 matches for the club. He left for a two-year contract with Chapecoense.

On 16 January, Marlos Moreno was announced as Flamengo's first loan signing of the season. Moreno was on loan to Girona in Spain and is under contract with Manchester City.

On 24 January CONMEBOL, the football governing body of South America, announced that Flamengo would be forced to play their first two home matches of the Copa Libertadores behind closed doors with no fans present. This was a punishment for the chaos during the second leg of the 2017 Copa Sudamericana final where crowds of Flamenguistas forcefully attempted to enter the Maracanã stadium without tickets. CONMEBOL determined that insufficient security and planning on Flamengo's behalf were at fault. The club was also fined $300,000. It was also announced at this time by the CONMEBOL Disciplinary Tribunal that Colombian defensive midfielder Gustavo Cuéllar would be suspended for Flamengo's first two Libertadores matches for insulting comments made to the referee while receiving the silver medal after the Copa Sudamericana finals.

On the 29th Flamengo announced the return of goalkeeper Júlio César after 13 years of playing in Europe. He signed a 3-month contract with his home club before his planned retirement. He will wear the number 12 shirt (a retired number in honor of Flamengo supporters as the "12th man"). On 1 February the club announced the signing of striker Henrique Dourado from Fluminense until the end of 2021 for $3.5 million.

On 7 February, Italian club Udinese announced the signing of 21 year-old striker Felipe Vizeu for $6 million. He remained with Flamengo until the World Cup break.

=== Paolo Guerrero ===
In December 2017 Peruvian striker Paolo Guerrero, under contract with Flamengo until August 2018, was banned by FIFA from all competitive fixtures for one year after testing positive for traces of cocaine. Twelve days later on appeal, his ban was reduced to six months thus making him eligible for the World Cup in June. For this period he was not permitted to train at Flamengo's facilities and the club supervised his pre-season activities from off-site. On 14 January Flamengo suspended his contract and withheld salary for a period of three months, a permissible act for an ineligible player. In February it was announced that the World Anti-Doping Agency planned to appeal against his reduced ban in the Court of Arbitration for Sport. Guerrero participated in three matches for Flamengo after his six-month ban ended in May, but on 14 May WADA's appeal was successful and Guerrero was suspended for an additional two months on top of the year-long ban, making him ineligible until 2019. At this time Flamengo suspended his contract again, further damaging ties between the player and the club. Guerrero was not pleased that the first contract suspension was made public and he sought retroactive payment of wages.

On 31 May the Swiss Federal Court granted a temporary freeze of his ban, permitting him to participate in the World Cup with Peru. On 2 July after Peru's elimination from the World Cup, Guerrero was re-presented at Flamengo. It was unclear if the Swiss court's decision to freeze the ban was still in effect. On 18 July, after seeking clarification from CAS, CBF, FIFA and the Brazilian Superior Court of Sport Justice, the club received confirmation from CAS that the striker was free to participate in the Brazilian championship. He appeared on the Flamengo bench that evening against São Paulo.

After the expiration of his term with Flamengo on 10 August, the striker signed a 3-year contract with Internacional.

=== January ===
As one of Brazil's largest clubs, Flamengo's season always begins with high expectations from supporters and media. The club's first test is the traditional Campeonato Carioca – the Rio de Janeiro State league – contested among clubs in the top flight of the FERJ's league (separate from the national league pyramid). The most important matches in the state are between the "big 4" clubs in the city of Rio – Flamengo, Fluminense, Vasco da Gama, and Botafogo.

Flamengo debuted in 2018 against Volta Redonda on 17 January with a team of young players and won 2-0 with two beautiful goals from Lucas Silva and Pepê. Flamengo had contested the final of the 2017 Copa Sudamericana only a month prior, so much of the Flamengo starting lineup had only just begun preseason training. With mostly young players, Flamengo carried a perfect record through the first three matches of the state league with goals from "wonderkids" Vinícius Júnior and Lincoln.

The Rubro-Negro’s first real test, the Clássico of Millions against Vasco in the Maracanã, was a 0-0 disappointment featuring many of Flamengo's first-team starters. Nevertheless, the draw guaranteed a top finish in the group stage and qualification to the Taça Guanabara semifinals. On 10 February against Botafogo, new signing from Fluminense Henrique Dourado made his Flamengo debut and scored. In the final minutes of stoppage time the youngster Vinícius Júnior scored, guaranteeing the victory by a 3-1 scoreline and taunting the Botafogo supporters with a "crybaby" gesture, earning a yellow card after being swarmed by the Botafogo players. Three days later on the 13th, the president of Botafogo announced that they would not allow their home stadium of Nilton Santos to be used for the Taça Guanabara final after the "disrespectful" gesture by Vinícius Jr. and no apology from Flamengo. Flamengo went on to defeat Boavista in the final the following week, played at the Kleber Andrade Stadium in the neighboring state of Espirito Santos. Vinícius scored again and claimed Flamengo's 21st Taça Guanabara title, closing out the first phase of the Rio de Janeiro league and qualifying for the Campeonato Carioca final stage.

=== February ===
The second phase of the Rio de Janeiro State League, the Taça Rio, coincided with Flamengo's first matches in the 2018 Copa Libertadores group stage. The long period of ill-will between the presidents of Flamengo and Botafogo appeared to be coming to an end prior to the "crybaby" incident. However, heavy winds and rain on 15 February caused two stadium light towers at Estádio Luso Brasileiro to collapse. Flamengo had been renting Luso Brasileiro from Portuguesa since the beginning of 2017 after failures to come to agreements with the state government of Rio de Janeiro and the operators of the Maracanã over costs and match revenue.

After the judgement from CONMEBOL in January for Flamengo to play two home matches in the Libertadores behind closed doors, Flamengo made the decision to play their matches at the smaller Luso Brasileiro instead of the Maracanã. After the lighting fixture collapse, Flamengo was under pressure to announce a new venue prior to 16 February. They reached a "peace treaty" with Botafogo in time to announce the rental of Nilton Santos stadium for two matches: their first match of the Taça Rio against Madueira on 21 Feb and their first match of their 2018 Copa Libertadores campaign against River Plate on 28 February.

Flamengo rolled out their starters against Madureira in their Taça Rio opener for preparation against River Plate the following week and created 4 goals from some of their most important playmakers: Diego, Henrique Dourado, Lucas Paquetá, and Vinícius Júnior. Three days later, Flamengo preserved their starters (resting all but goalkeeper Diego Alves) and were soundly thrashed by rival Fluminense 4-0.

On 28 February Flamengo hosted Argentine giants River Plate at an empty Nilton Santos Stadium. River Plate took advantage of the calm atmosphere throughout the scoreless first half, before the "Grim Reaper" (“Ceifador”) – Henrique Dourado – broke the deadlock. Rodrigo Mora equalized for River. Éverton gave Flamengo the lead again with an assist from Paquetá, but Camilo Mayada scored a goal from outside the box to finish the match 2-2, two leads lost by the Brazilians.

=== March ===
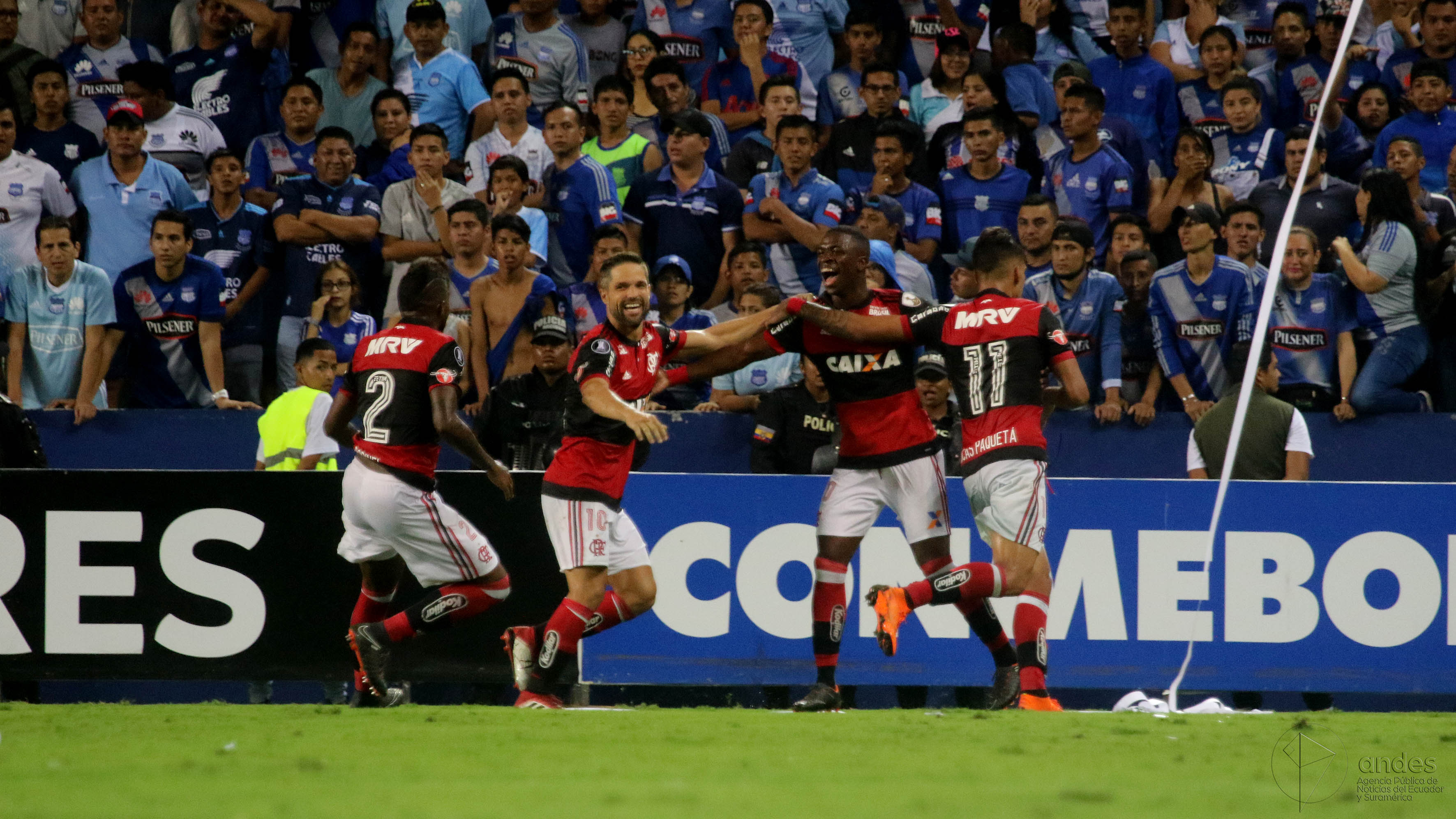
Vinícius Jr. and Flamengo celebrate after scoring against Emelec in Guayaquil in the 2018 Copa Libertadores

Flamengo returned to Rio action with a third "disappointing" result in a row: an uninspiring 1-0 victory over Botafogo, the credit of an allowed offside goal. On 7 March, beloved former Flamengo and Brazilian National Team goalkeeper Júlio César made his return to the club after 13 years in Europe. He signed a three-month contract with Flamengo prior to retirement and captained the match against Boavista, a 3-0 win. The congested schedule took its toll on the club another time: Flamengo rested their starters for Copa Libertadores again and lost to Macae on 10 March for the first time in their history.

Flamengo travelled to Guayaquil, Ecuador for their mid-week Copa Libertadores encounter with Emelec on 14 March and youngster Vinícius Júnior cemented his legacy as a rising star. With his club trailing 1-0 after a goal from Brayan Angulo, Vinícius was put on in the 67th minute and scored twice before the final whistle. This was Flamengo's first victory away from home in the Libertadores since 2014 (also against Emelec).

The Rubro-Negro returned to the state league to rout Portuguesa 4-0 with a penalty save from Diego Alves, but a Vasco victory over Botafogo landed Flamengo in 2nd place in the group before their semifinal match against Fluminense. Because Fluminense held the advantage of finishing top of their group, a draw would advance them and eliminate Flamengo. The semifinal match was exciting and full of attacking chances, with Gum of Fluminense opening the score in the first minute of the second half. Éverton equalized in the 86th minute but the team could not take the lead. Flamengo were eliminated from the second phase of the Carioca but were still guaranteed a place in the final stage.

Despite disappointments, Flamengo had collected the most points across the two group phases to finish top of the overall Rio de Janeiro State League table, and were paired with Botafogo in the semifinal on 28 March. Luiz Fernando scored in the 39th minute for Botafogo and returned a taunt to the Flamengo supporters at the Maracanã: the "little smell" gesture (“cheirinho”) by covering his nose with his fingers, a reference to Flamengo fans "smelling the Hexa" in 2016, anticipating their club's sixth Brazilian championship that never came. Flamengo pressed in the second half but could not score as their rivals bunkered down. Flamengo were eliminated and Botafogo went on to defeat Vasco in the two-legged final on penalties.

The following day Flamengo announced that head coach Paulo César Carpegiani and football director Rodrigo Caetano had been fired. Carpegiani had been at his post for 17 matches and less than three months. Caetano had been with Flamengo since 2015 and the club had only won the 2017 Campeonato Carioca in that span, finishing runners-up in the Copa do Brasil and Copa Sudamericana that same year. The decision was made by the vice presidents of the club who felt that the team's performance against Botafogo was "shameful." In an official statement, Carpegiani thanked the club and fans and wrote that he had won 11 of 17 matches, only one of their three defeats had been with the senior lineup, and Flamengo were currently top of their group in the Libertadores.

The Flamengo board began the process of hiring a new coach, interviewing with Cuca and Renato Gaucho and considering the possibility of tasking assistant coach 36 year-old Mauricio Barbieri as caretaker. Their goal was to have a new coach within a week to prepare for their 18 April Libertadores match against Santa Fe. Flamengo scheduled a friendly against Brazilian Série B side Atlético Goianiense on 7 April. Barbieri oversaw the team for the match in which Júlio César started in goal. Atlético-GO scored first but Diego scored twice in the 2nd half and Henrique Dourade converted a penalty to earn a 3-1 victory in the friendly before the first round of the Brasileirão the following week.

=== April ===
Mauricio Barbieri, hired at the start of 2018 as an assistant, was the acting head coach of Flamengo at the start of the Brazilian national league season. They began their season by flying northeast to meet Vitória. The match began perfectly with Paquetá scoring 16 seconds in, but ultimately the day ended in controversy. In the 10th minute Éverton Ribiero was sent off and a penalty was awarded to the home team for a wrongly assessed hand-ball in the box. In the 2nd half Flamengo took a 2-1 lead from an allowed offside Réver goal. The match ended in a 2-2 draw.

The club initially planned to host their second closed-door Libertadores home match at Nilton Santos again, but after coming to an agreement with the operators of the Maracanã they opted to play in the historic venue. The day before the match against Santa Fe, 45,000 fans attended open training in the Maracanã that was made available to the general public with reduced-price tickets. In the match, Henrique Dourado scored first from a corner kick in the 7th minute but conceded and finished as a 1-1 draw despite having several more scoring chances than their opponents. The result cast more doubt on the leadership and organization of the club.

The following weekend in the Maracanã, Fla faced América Mineiro in Júlio César's farewell match with reduced-price tickets. Henrique Dourado scored twice to lift his team to victory.

On 17 April it was announced that Flamengo had reached a deal with São Paulo over the transfer of striker Éverton for €3.5m. Éverton had been with Flamengo for four seasons and 118 matches.

As the leader of Group 4 in the Libertadores with two draws and one win, Flamengo traveled to Bogotá to face Santa Fe once more. Their recent lackluster performances had resulted in more protests and demonstrations back home, and the club (specifically president Eduardo Bandeira de Mello) were physically accosted by angry fans at the airport. On the field Flamengo and Santa Fe finished 0-0, with critics calling it a fortunate result for Flamengo's most apathetic performance so far. There was controversy at the end when the referee blew the final whistle in the middle of a promising attack for the Brazilians. Fans and media remained critical of their continental play (3 draws in 4 matches), some lamented the poor decision to release coach Zé Ricardo in 2017 and others demanded a replacement for Barbieri. Flamengo were again harassed by a mob before their flight to Fortaleza to face Ceará in league play, with much of the criticism targeted towards Diego and the team's lack of passion. Goalkeeper Diego Alves threw a cup of coffee at the protesters in retaliation. In the match, team spirits were lifted with two goals from Vinícius Júnior and one from Diego himself, who celebrated by embracing the Flamengo supporters in the crowd. The solid victory relieved some pressure on the team, but situations were still complicated in a club election year and with a board of directors still uncertain about their head coach after a month of service.

=== May ===
Flamengo's first domestic cup match came on 2 May away to Ponte Preta who they defeated 1-0. The following weekend Paolo Guerrero made his return after being suspended from competitive play for six months. The league match against Internacional in the Maracanã set a season attendance record Flamengo, who were victorious 2-0. In the home leg of their cup tie against Ponte Preta, Flamengo played compact and advance to the Copa do Brasil quarterfinals for the 18th time with a 0-0 draw.

Much pressure had subsided for Flamengo who were playing better and had not conceded a goal in 5 matches, having one of the best defenses in Serie A along with Grêmio. Sitting atop the league they rested four starters (Diego Alves, Réver, Paquetá, and Éverton Ribiero) for Chapecoense in preparation for a decisive Libertadores fixture against Emelec. Flamengo lost 3-2, their first league loss and Chape's first win. They remained at the top of the league, tied on points with Corinthians and Atlético-MG. Guerrero scored his first post-suspension goal.

On 16 May, Flamengo hosted Emelec for their first home Libertadores match in front of a crowd. The club announced new security measures and traffic controls. Everton Ribiero scored both Flamengo goals in a 2-0 victory just days after the birth of his newborn son. The result guaranteed Flamengo's qualification to the knockout round of the competition for the first time since 2010, and with a group stage match to spare.

The same week, TAS announced that they had extended Paolo Guerrero's suspension an additional eight months after appeal from WADA. He would miss the World Cup, and Flamengo suspended his contract for a second time.

In the 6th round of the Brasileirao the Rubro-Negro fought rival Vasco da Gama to a 1-1 draw. Vinicius scored, Rever came off due to injury, and the match ended with four player expulsions including Cueller and Rodolfo. Flamengo fell to 2nd place in the league behind Atletico Mineiro.

Set to face River Plate in the Monumental de Nuñez for control of first place in the group, midfielder Diego and head coach Mauricio Barbieri were suspended for their infractions against Emelec. Travelling supporters greeted the players with festivities and support in Buenos Aires. Flamengo played cautiously and the match ended scoreless, landing them at second place in the group.

With top spot in the league at stake, the club from Rio traveled to Belo Horizonte to face leaders Atletico Mineiro. Flamengo won 1-0, and with a Corinthians loss to Internacional the following day they moved back into the league leadership.

On 28 May, Lucas Paquetá was listed on Brazilian National Team head coach Tite's 12-man standby roster for the 2018 World Cup. Paquetá was the youngest player listed on standby. However he was not called up to the main squad.

=== June ===
With Libertadores and Copa do Brasil fixtures only resuming after the World Cup, Flamengo looked to take advantage of the following five rounds in the Brasileirão. On 31 May they defeated Bahia 2-0 in the Maracanã with a superb goal from Paquetá to preserve their tight lead in the table. After two months of Barbieri's caretaken tenure it was clear that he would soon become official and the club was still searching for coordinators to support him. On 31 May Paolo Guerrero was granted permission to play for Peru in the World Cup and he soon departed for training. Many of Flamengo's following matches would be played without Guerrero and Trauco (of the Peru national team) and Cuellar (on Colombia's selection).

Flamengo went on to defeat Corinthians at home, Fluminense in the capital city of Brasília, and Paraná Clube back in the Maracanã to open up a 6-point lead in the table after five straight victories. They outscored opponents 8 to 0 in that span with three goals contributed by Felipe Vizeu. On 10 June in the Maracanã, Vinícius Júnior and Felipe Vizeu gave a tearful farewell after defeating Paraná 2-0 in their final home match with Flamengo before departure to Europe (Vinícius to Real Madrid and Felipe to Udinese).

The final match before the World Cup break was against Palmieras at Allianz Parque. The final score was 1-1, keeping Flamengo four points above Atlético-MG and São Paulo, but it ended in chaos as three players from each side (Cuéllar, Jonas, and Henrique Dourado for Flamengo) were sent off in the final minutes.

On 19 June, Flamengo confirmed the appointment of Mauricio Barbieri as official head coach after 72 days as the interim. He led Flamengo into the World Cup break as league leader, 11 victories in 18 matches and at least one goal scored in every match. His new agreement allows for the possibility of renewal in 2019.

=== June - July ===
President Eduardo Bandeira expressed the importance of signing reinforcements to replace Éverton, Felipe Vizeu, and possibly Paulo Guerrero in preparation for a challenging August featuring Copa do Brasil and Copa Libertadores ties against tough opposition. On 11 June, the club agreed to a 2 1/2-year contract with the operators of the Estádio Maracanã for first preference for Flamengo home matches and an agreeable rental price. In the wake of this agreement, Flamengo terminated their contract with Portuguesa to rent the Ilha do Urubu stadium until the end of 2019 but confirmed that their lawsuit against the construction company that installed the collapsed lighting towers would continue.

On 22 June, defensive midfielder Jonas was sold to Saudi Arabian club Al-Ittihad for R$9 million (€2.1m). On the same day, Flamengo announced the signing of their first reinforcement: Colombian striker Fernando Uribe on a free transfer from Toluca. On 17 July the club announced contract renewals for defenders Rodinei and Thuler.

The Brazilian Serie A pauses for the World Cup every four years while the lower leagues continue. Flamengo's first match after the break resulted in their first loss in eight matches. Third-place club São Paulo visited the Maracanã and Éverton scored against his former team three months after being transferred. The Tricolor closed the gap to 1 point. Flamengo ended July with two home victories against Botafogo and Sport, and a draw against Santos at the Vila Belmiro. Uribe opened his account for Flamengo against Sport, and academy product Matheus Sávio made his impact in place of Vinícius Jr, scoring after 5 minutes against Botafogo. Paquetá's goal in that match badly injured and hospitalized Botafogo goalkeeper Jefferson.

On 24 July the club's signing of Vitinho from CSKA Moscow was confirmed after the Russian club accepted Flamengo's offer of €10m, Flamengo's most expensive signing and one of the most expensive signings in Brazilian club history. At this time, Flamengo was also attempting to move defensive midfielder Willian Arão to Olympiakos but the player did not agree to the contract terms.

=== August ===
Flamengo were scheduled to participate in a daunting nine matches in the month of August, three matches each against Grêmio and Cruzeiro. On 30 July, citing leg pain, Guerrero chose not travel with the team away to Porto Alegre for their Copa do Brasil match. Tite and European scouts were in attendance for the match against Grêmio. New transfer Vitinho made his debut, and 17 year-old Lincoln came on in substitution and scored dramatically late to equalize.

On 2 August Flamengo announced the signing of Paraguayan midfielder Robert Piris da Mota. Flamengo announced that Vitinho, Uribe, Savio, and Piris would replace Everton, Vinicius, Felipe Vizeu and Jonas on their Copa Libertadores round of 16 30-man roster.

On 5 August, São Paulo takes over the lead in the Brasileirao after an embarrassing 2-0 loss by Flamengo to Grêmio's mostly reserve lineup. With Lucas Paquetá unavailable in their Libertadores match against Cruzeiro, Flamengo were stunned 2-0 at home on the 8th. They suffered an early goal from Arrascaeta that they could not recover from, finding themselves at serious risk of elimination from the Copa Libertadores round of 16. Flamengo had difficulty organizing themselves without Paquetá.

The club's tumultuous relationship with Guerrero reached its end on 10 Aug. He did not train with the team for the week and Barbieri did not list him for Flamengo's league match against Cruzeiro on the 12th. He was released as a free agent and Internacional signed him to a 3-year contract.

By this point, the number of goals conceded by Flamengo had increased from 0.54 per match for their first 35 matches to 1.14 over their last seven matches. Flamengo faced Cruzeiro once again the following weekend in league play and earned a better result: with Paquetá available and coach Barieri insisting that the team would not preserve starters for the Libertadores or Copa do Brasil, Flamengo won 1-0 on a goal from Henrique Dourado who re-entered the starting lineup after the departure of Guerrero and a thigh injury suffered by Uribe. The team finished the first half of the league season in second place.

According to Barbieri, the league victory against Cruzeiro gave Flamengo the confidence needed in the return-leg of their cup tie against Grêmio. In a crowded Maracanã, Éverton Ribeiro scored early and withstood Grêmio's pressure, with only 40% total possession of their own. Flamengo eliminated Grêmio 2-1 on aggregate and advanced to the semifinal against Corinthians.

On 17 August, Tite and the Brazilian National Team announced the call-up of Lucas Paquetá for the first time for a pair of friendlies against the USA and El Salvador in September. Since the friendlies would coincide with key Copa do Brasil semifinal matches, the Selecao only called up one starter from each participating club. Flamengo president Bandeira expressed outraged at the decision to call Paquetá. The club's request to release Paquetá from the friendlies was rejected by CBF. Paquetá came on in substitute against El Salvador in Washington, D.C. on 11 September and still started and played 73 minutes against Corinthians the very next night in the Maracanã. Flamengo U-20 goalkeeper Hugo was also called up for the friendlies but did not play.

On 19 August Flamengo were humiliated in league play against Atlético Paranaense, conceding three goals in the first 21 minutes. Suffering the absences of Diego and Réver on suspension, Barbieri's positional adjustments and the team's low-intensity start surrendered the points early. Cuellar denied that a fight had occurred in training between him and Rodinei following the loss. On 22 August it was determined that Flamengo would host the first leg of their Copa do Brasil semifinal tie against Corinthians.

Flamengo renewed center-back Léo Duarte's contract through 2022.

Flamengo kept afloat in the league with a 1-0 home victory over Vitória (goal scored by Diego) but disappointingly conceded the equalizing goal against América-MG in the 87th minute after an undisciplined sending-off of Cuellar in the second half. They remained four points behind leader São Paulo.

The 15 September league match against Vasco da Gama was confirmed to be played at the Mané Garrincha in Brasília.

Regarded as Flamengo's "game of the year" by Barbieri, the Copa Libertadores away leg against Cruzeiro on 29 August would require Flamengo to overcome a 2-0 deficit. Still without Fernando Uribe, the Rubro-Negro played well and won 1-0 by a goal from Leo Duarte but it was not enough to overcome the mistakes of the first leg. Flamengo were eliminated from the Libertadores in the round of 16.

== Roster ==
As of the end of the season.

=== First-team squad ===
Note: Flags indicate national team as defined under FIFA eligibility rules; some limited exceptions apply. Players may hold more than one non-FIFA nationality.

No.	Pos.	Nation	Player
1	GK	BRA	Diego Alves
2	DF	BRA	Rodinei
4	DF	BRA	Juan (vice-captain)
5	MF	BRA	Willian Arão
6	DF	BRA	Renê
7	MF	BRA	Éverton Ribeiro
8	MF	COL	Gustavo Cuéllar
10	MF	BRA	Diego (3rd captain)
11	MF	BRA	Lucas Paquetá
13	DF	PER	Miguel Trauco
14	FW	BRA	Vitinho
15	DF	BRA	Réver (captain)
16	MF	BRA	Ronaldo
17	FW	COL	Marlos Moreno (on loan from Manchester City)
18	MF	BRA	Jean Lucas
19	FW	BRA	Henrique Dourado

No.	Pos.	Nation	Player
20	FW	COL	Fernando Uribe
21	DF	BRA	Pará
22	MF	BRA	Matheus Sávio
23	FW	BRA	Geuvânio (on loan from Tianjin Quanjian F.C.)
25	MF	PAR	Robert Piris Da Motta
26	DF	BRA	Matheus Thuler
27	MF	BRA	Rômulo
28	FW	COL	Orlando Berrío
29	FW	BRA	Lincoln
30	GK	BRA	Thiago
37	GK	BRA	César
43	DF	BRA	Léo Duarte
44	DF	BRA	Rhodolfo
45	GK	BRA	Gabriel Batista
—	DF	BRA	Kléber

Players with Dual Nationality

- (Brazil) (Italy) Diego Alves
- (Brazil) (Italy) Diego
- (Brazil) (Italy) Rhodolfo

=== Reserves ===
Note: Flags indicate national team as defined under FIFA eligibility rules; some limited exceptions apply. Players may hold more than one non-FIFA nationality.

No.	Pos.	Nation	Player
40	MF	BRA	Thiago Santos
46	GK	BRA	Yago Darub
52	DF	BRA	Patrick
53	FW	BRA	Lucas Silva
54	FW	BRA	Vitor Gabriel
55	DF	BRA	Matheus Dantas
57	MF	BRA	Pepê
58	DF	BRA	Rafael Santos
59	DF	BRA	Michael
–	GK	BRA	Hugo Souza

No.	Pos.	Nation	Player
–	DF	BRA	Pablo Maldini
–	DF	BRA	Ramon
–	DF	BRA	Dener
–	MF	BRA	Hugo Moura
–	MF	BRA	Gabriel Kazu
–	MF	BRA	Luiz Henrique
–	FW	BRA	Loran
–	FW	BRA	Wendel
–	FW	BRA	Gabriel Silva

== Transfers and loans ==
=== Transfers in ===
Position	Player	Transferred from	Fee	Date	Source
MF	(Brazil) Jajá	(Brazil) Vila Nova	Loan return	1 January 2018	
MF	(Brazil) Ronaldo	(Brazil) Atlético Goianiense	Loan return	1 January 2018	
MF	(Brazil) Jonas	(Brazil) Coritiba	Loan return	1 January 2018	
DF	(Brazil) Léo	(Brazil) Atlético Paranaense	Loan return	1 January 2018	
GK	(Brazil) Júlio César	Free agent	Free	29 January 2018	
FW	(Brazil) Henrique Dourado	(Brazil) Fluminense	US$3.5m / €2.8m	1 February 2018	
MF	(Brazil) Gabriel Kazu	(Brazil) Luverdense	Free	14 February 2018	
MF	(Brazil) Matheus Trindade	(India) Jamshedpur FC	Loan return	30 March 2018	
FW	(Brazil) Thiago Santos	(India) Mumbai City FC	Loan return	22 April 2018	
FW	(Brazil) Gabriel Silva	(Brazil) Tupi	Loan return	31 May 2018	
MF	(Brazil) Matheus Sávio	(Portugal) Estoril	Loan return	6 June 2018	
FW	(Colombia) Fernando Uribe	Free agent (Note: Uribe was signed from Deportivo Toluca on a free transfer.)	Free	26 June 2018	
FW	(Brazil) Vitinho	(Russia) CSKA Moscow	US$12.8m / €10m	24 July 2018	
MF	(Paraguay) Robert Piris Da Motta	(Argentina) San Lorenzo	US$2.9m / €2.5m	1 August 2018	
Total			US$19.2m / €15.3m		

=== Loan in ===
Position	Player	Loaned from	Start	End	Source
FW	(Colombia) Marlos Moreno	(England) Manchester City	12 January 2018	31 December 2018	

=== Transfers out ===
Position	Player	Transferred to	Fee	Date	Source
MF	(Argentina) Darío Conca	(China) Shanghai SIPG	Loan return	9 December 2017	
FW	(Brazil) Gabriel Ramos	Free agent	End of contract	1 January 2018	
FW	(Brazil) Douglas Baggio	Free agent	End of contract	1 January 2018	
FW	(Brazil) Rafinha	Free agent	End of contract	1 January 2018	
MF	(Brazil) Muralha	Free agent	End of contract	1 January 2018	
MF	(Brazil) Luiz Antônio	Free agent	End of contract	1 January 2018	
DF	(Brazil) Rafael Dumas	Free agent	End of contract	1 January 2018	
FW	(Brazil) Paulinho	Free agent	End of contract	1 January 2018	
MF	(Brazil) Márcio Araújo	(Brazil) Chapecoense	Free	5 January 2018	
HC	(Colombia) Reinaldo Rueda	Chile	US$0.8m / €0.6m	8 January 2018	
MF	(Argentina) Federico Mancuello	(Brazil) Cruzeiro	US$1.8m / €1.5m	16 January 2018	
MF	(Brazil) Éverton	(Brazil) São Paulo	US$4.2m / €3.5m	17 April 2018	
GK	(Brazil) Júlio César	Retired	End of contract	22 April 2018	
MF	(Brazil) Jonas	(Saudi Arabia) Al-Ittihad	US$2.4m / €2.1m	23 June 2018	
FW	(Brazil) Felipe Vizeu	(Italy) Udinese	US$6m / €4.9m	1 July 2018	
MF	(Brazil) Ederson	Free agent	End of contract	1 July 2018	
FW	(Brazil) Vinícius Júnior	(Spain) Real Madrid	US$53.4m / €45m	12 July 2018	
FW	(Peru) Paolo Guerrero	Free agent (Note: Guerrero signed with Internacional on a free transfer.)	End of contract	10 August 2018	
Total			US$68.6m / €57.6m		

=== Loan out ===
Position	Player	Loaned to	Start	End	Source
MF	(Brazil) Gabriel Silva	(Brazil) Veranópolis	5 January 2018	15 April 2018	
DF	(Brazil) Moraes	(Brazil) São Bento	5 January 2018	31 December 2018	
DF	(Brazil) Thiago Ennes	(Brazil) Náutico	5 January 2018	31 December 2018	
MF	(Brazil) Matheus Trindade	(India) Jamshedpur FC	5 January 2018	30 March 2018	
FW	(Brazil) Thiago Santos	(India) Mumbai City FC	5 January 2018	22 April 2018	
FW	(Brazil) Nixon	(Sweden) Kalmar	5 January 2018	31 December 2018	
MF	(Brazil) Matheus Sávio	(Portugal) Estoril	5 January 2018	5 June 2018	
MF	(Argentina) Héctor Canteros	(Brazil) Chapecoense	5 January 2018	31 December 2018	
MF	(Brazil) Gabriel	(Brazil) Sport Recife	15 January 2018	31 December 2018	
GK	(Brazil) Alex Muralha	(Japan) Albirex Niigata	23 January 2018	31 December 2018	
DF	(Brazil) Léo	(Brazil) Fluminense	24 January 2018	31 December 2018	
MF	(Brazil) Cafu	(Brazil) Botafogo-SP	25 January 2018	31 December 2018	
DF	(Brazil) Rafael Vaz	Universidad de Chile	25 January 2018	31 December 2018	
MF	(Brazil) Gabriel Silva	(Brazil) Tupi	16 April 2018	31 December 2018	
MF	(Brazil) Jajá	(Sweden) Kalmar	15 July 2018	31 December 2018	
MF	(Brazil) Matheus Trindade	(Brazil) Atlético Goianiense	3 August 2018	31 December 2018	

== Staff ==
Position	Staff
Head coach	(Brazil) Dorival Júnior
General manager	(Brazil) Carlos Noval
Supervisor	(Brazil) Bruno Coev
Supervisor	(Brazil) Marcio Santos
Assistant coach	(Brazil) Maurício Souza
Goalkeeping coach	(Brazil) Rogério Maia
Goalkeeping coach	(Brazil) José Jober
Fitness coach	(Brazil) Diogo Linhares
Fitness coach	(Brazil) Fábio Eiras
Fitness coach	(Brazil) Roberto Oliveira Junior
Medical staff manager	(Brazil) Marcio Tannure

Last updated: 28 September 2018
Source: Flamengo

=== Managerial changes ===
Outgoing manager	Manner of departure	Date of vacancy	Incoming manager	Date of appointment
(Brazil) Paulo César Carpegiani	Sacked	29 March 2018	(Brazil) Mauricio Barbieri (caretaker)	30 March 2018
(Brazil) Mauricio Barbieri	End of caretaker tenure	19 June 2018	(Brazil) Mauricio Barbieri	19 June 2018
(Brazil) Mauricio Barbieri	Sacked	28 September 2018	(Brazil) Dorival Júnior	28 September 2018

== Competitions ==
=== Overview ===
Competition	First match	Last match	Starting round	Final position	Record							
Competition	First match	Last match	Starting round	Final position	Pld	W	D	L	GF	GA	GD	Win %
Campeonato Carioca	17 January 2018	28 March 2018	Matchday 1	Semifinal	15	10	2	3	23	7	+16	66.67
Campeonato Brasileiro Série A	14 April 2018	1 December 2018	Round 1	Runners-up	38	21	9	8	59	29	+30	55.26
Copa do Brasil	2 May 2018	26 September 2018	Round of 16	Semifinals	6	2	3	1	4	3	+1	33.33
Copa Libertadores	28 February 2018	29 August 2018	Group stage	Round of 16	8	3	4	1	8	6	+2	37.50
Total					67	36	18	13	94	45	+49	53.73

Source: Competitions

=== Friendlies ===
Flamengo didn't play any pre-season match in 2018 and the only friendly of the year was on 7 April, few days after the elimination in Campeonato Carioca. The match was played against Série B club Atlético Goianiense.

7 April 2018 Friendly	Atlético Goianiense	1–3	Flamengo	Goiânia
16:00	Joanderson 39'	Report	Diego 46', 72'; Dourado 48' (pen.)	Stadium: Estádio Olímpico Pedro Ludovico; Referee: Bruno Rezende

=== Campeonato Carioca ===
Flamengo was drawn into Group A for the Campeonato Carioca, the Rio de Janeiro State League.

==== Taça Guanabara ====
Group A
Pos	Team	Pld	W	D	L	GF	GA	GD	Pts	Qualification
1	Flamengo	5	4	1	0	5	0	+5	13	Advance to Semifinals
2	Bangu	5	2	2	1	6	3	+3	8	Advance to Semifinals
3	Vasco da Gama	5	2	1	2	8	7	+1	7	
4	Nova Iguaçu	5	1	2	2	5	6	−1	5	
5	Cabofriense	5	1	1	3	5	8	−3	4	
6	Volta Redonda	5	1	1	3	6	11	−5	4	

Updated to match(es) played on February 4, 2018. Source: FERJ
Rules for classification: 1) points; 2) goal difference; 3) number of goals scored.

17 January 2018 1	Volta Redonda	0–2	Flamengo	Volta Redonda
21:45			Silva 34'; Pepê 50'	Stadium: Estádio Raulino de Oliveira

21 January 2018 2	Flamengo	1–0	Cabofriense	Rio de Janeiro
20:15	Vinícius Jr. 33'			Stadium: Ilha do Urubu; Attendance: 4,045; Referee: João Batista de Arruda

24 January 2018 3	Flamengo	1–0	Bangu	Rio de Janeiro
19:30	Lincoln 36'			Stadium: Ilha do Urubu; Attendance: 4,589; Referee: Leonardo Garcia Cavaleiro

27 January 2018 4	Flamengo	0–0	Vasco da Gama	Rio de Janeiro
17:00				Stadium: Estádio do Maracanã; Attendance: 20,862; Referee: Bruno Arleu de Araujo

4 February 2018 5	Nova Iguaçu	0–1	Flamengo	Brasília
17:00	Matheus (yellow card) 73' (red card) 80'		Rhodolfo 90+3'	Stadium: Estádio Nacional; Attendance: 16,088; Referee: Alexandre Vargas Tavares de Jesus

=== Semifinal ===
10 February 2018	Flamengo	3–1	Botafogo	Volta Redonda
16:30	Éverton 36'; Dourado 49'; Vinícius Jr. 90+4'		Kieza 69'	Stadium: Estádio Raulino de Oliveira; Referee: Bruno Arleu de Araujo

=== Final ===
18 February 2018	Boavista	0–2	Flamengo	Cariacica
17:00			Kadu 65' (o.g.); Vinícius Jr. 78'	Stadium: Estádio Kléber Andrade; Attendance: 17,787; Referee: Rodrigo Nunes de Sá

==== Taça Rio ====
Group A
Pos	Team	Pld	W	D	L	GF	GA	GD	Pts	Qualification
1	Vasco da Gama	6	4	1	1	12	8	+4	13	Advance to Semifinals
2	Flamengo	6	4	0	2	12	5	+7	12	Advance to Semifinals
3	Cabofriense	6	3	1	2	8	6	+2	10	
4	Bangu	6	1	2	3	5	11	−6	5	
5	Volta Redonda	6	0	3	3	5	9	−4	3	
6	Nova Iguaçu	6	0	1	5	5	11	−6	1	

Updated to match(es) played on March 18, 2018. Source: FERJ
Rules for classification: 1) points; 2) goal difference; 3) number of goals scored.

21 February 2018 1	Flamengo	4–0	Madureira	Rio de Janeiro
19:30	Diego 18'; Paquetá 35'; Dourado 55' (pen.); Vinícius Jr. 83'			Stadium: Estádio Nilton Santos; Attendance: 4,672; Referee: Marcelo de Lima Henrique

24 February 2018 2	Fluminense	4–0	Flamengo	Cuiabá
17:00	Marcos Júnior 2', 56'; Pedro 18'; Gilberto 40'		Cuéllar (yellow card) 35' (red card) 83'	Stadium: Arena Pantanal; Attendance: 15,884; Referee: Mauricio Machado Coelho Junior

3 March 2018 3	Flamengo	1–0	Botafogo	Brasília
17:00	Rhodolfo 4'			Stadium: Estádio Nacional; Attendance: 9,015; Referee: João Batista de Arruda

7 March 2018 4	Boavista	0–3	Flamengo	Volta Redonda
17:00			Rodinei 64'; Diego 81'; Paquetá 88'	Stadium: Estádio Raulino de Oliveira; Attendance: 3,601; Referee: João Ennio Sobral

10 March 2018 5	Macaé	1–0	Flamengo	Macaé
19:30	Lepu 65'			Stadium: Estádio Cláudio Moacyr; Attendance: 3,601; Referee: João Ennio Sobral

18 March 2018 6	Flamengo	4–0	Portuguesa	Cariacica
16:00	Ribeiro 18'; Dourado 60' (pen.); Geuvânio 85', 88'			Stadium: Estádio Kléber Andrade; Attendance: 5,407; Referee: Rodrigo Carvalhaes de Miranda

=== Semifinal ===
22 March 2018	Fluminense	1–1	Flamengo	Rio de Janeiro
20:00	Gum 45'		Éverton 86'	Stadium: Estádio Nilton Santos; Attendance: 18,627; Referee: Mauricio Machado Coelho Jr.

Pos	Team	Pld	W	D	L	GF	GA	GD	Pts	Qualification or relegation
1	Flamengo (A)	11	8	1	2	17	5	+12	25	Advance to Final Stage
2	Fluminense (A)	11	6	4	1	17	7	+10	22	Advance to Final Stage
3	Vasco da Gama (A)	11	6	2	3	20	15	+5	20	Advance to Final Stage
4	Botafogo (A)	11	5	4	2	12	9	+3	19	Advance to Final Stage
5	Boavista (Q)	11	6	0	5	16	17	−1	18	2019 Brasileiro Série D

Updated to match(es) played on March 18, 2018. Source: FERJ
Rules for classification: 1) points; 2) goal difference; 3) number of goals scored.
(A) Advance to a further round; (Q) Qualified for the phase indicated

==== Final stage ====
28 March 2018 Semifinal	Flamengo	0–1	Botafogo	Rio de Janeiro
21:45			Luiz Fernando 39'	Stadium: Estádio do Maracanã; Attendance: 31,888; Referee: Marcelo de Lima Henrique

=== Copa Libertadores ===
The draw was held on 20 December 2017. Flamengo was drawn into Group D.

==== Group stage ====
Pos	Team	Pld	W	D	L	GF	GA	GD	Pts	Qualification
1	(Argentina) River Plate	6	3	3	0	6	3	+3	12	Round of 16
2	(Brazil) Flamengo	6	2	4	0	7	4	+3	10	Round of 16
3	(Colombia) Santa Fe	6	1	4	1	5	3	+2	7	Copa Sudamericana
4	(Ecuador) Emelec	6	0	1	5	3	11	−8	1	

Source: CONMEBOL
Rules for classification: Group stage tiebreakers

28 February 2018 1	Flamengo (Brazil)	2–2	(Argentina) River Plate	Rio de Janeiro
21:45	Dourado 54' (pen.); Éverton 66'		Mora 55'; Mayada 87'	Stadium: Estádio Nilton Santos; Attendance: Closed doors Referee: Mauricio Espinosa

14 March 2018 2	Emelec (Ecuador)	1–2	(Brazil) Flamengo	Guayaquil
21:45	Angulo 65'		Vinícius Jr. 78', 85'	Stadium: Estadio George Capwell; Attendance: 30,000; Referee: Mario Díaz de Vivar

18 April 2018 3	Flamengo (Brazil)	1–1	(Colombia) Santa Fe	Rio de Janeiro
21:45	Dourado 8'		Morelo 31'	Stadium: Estádio do Maracanã; Attendance: Closed doors Referee: Andrés Cunha

25 April 2018 4	Santa Fe (Colombia)	0–0	(Brazil) Flamengo	Bogotá
21:45				Stadium: Estadio El Campín; Attendance: 20,312; Referee: Daniel Fedorczuk

16 May 2018 5	Flamengo (Brazil)	2–0	(Ecuador) Emelec	Rio de Janeiro
21:45	Ribeiro 48', 90+2'			Stadium: Estádio do Maracanã; Attendance: 40,390; Referee: Diego Haro

23 May 2018 6	River Plate (Argentina)	0–0	(Brazil) Flamengo	Buenos Aires
21:45				Stadium: Estadio Monumental; Referee: Andrés Cunha

==== Round of 16 ====
The draw for the round of 16 was held on 4 June 2018, 20:00 PYT (UTC−4), at the CONMEBOL Convention Centre in Luque, Paraguay.

8 August 2018 First leg	Flamengo (Brazil)	0–2	(Brazil) Cruzeiro	Rio de Janeiro
21:45			De Arrascaeta 10'; Neves 78'	Stadium: Estádio do Maracanã; Attendance: 45,967; Referee: Nestor Pitana

29 August 2018 Second leg	Cruzeiro (Brazil)	0–1 (2–1 agg.)	(Brazil) Flamengo	Belo Horizonte
21:45			Duarte 70'	Stadium: Mineirão; Referee: Andrés Cunha

=== Campeonato Brasileiro ===
==== League table ====
Pos	Team	Pld	W	D	L	GF	GA	GD	Pts	Qualification or relegation
1	Palmeiras (C)	38	23	11	4	64	26	+38	80	Qualification for Copa Libertadores group stage
2	Flamengo	38	21	9	8	59	29	+30	72	Qualification for Copa Libertadores group stage
3	Internacional	38	19	12	7	51	29	+22	69	Qualification for Copa Libertadores group stage
4	Grêmio	38	18	12	8	48	27	+21	66	Qualification for Copa Libertadores group stage
5	São Paulo	38	16	15	7	46	34	+12	63	Qualification for Copa Libertadores second stage

Source: CBF
Rules for classification: 1) points; 2) wins; 3) goal difference; 4) goals scored; 5) head-to-head results; 6) least red cards received; 7) least yellow cards received; 8) draw.
(C) Champions

==== Results by round ====
Round	1	2	3	4	5	6	7	8	9	10	11	12	13	14	15	16	17	18	19	20	21	22	23	24	25	26	27	28	29	30	31	32	33	34	35	36	37	38
Ground	A	H	A	H	A	H	A	H	H	A	H	A	H	H	A	H	A	H	A	H	A	H	A	H	A	H	A	A	H	A	H	A	A	H	A	H	A	H
Result	D	W	W	W	L	D	W	W	W	W	W	D	L	W	D	W	L	W	L	W	D	L	L	W	D	W	D	W	W	W	D	D	L	W	W	W	W	L
Position	10	3	1	1	1	2	1	1	1	1	1	1	1	1	1	1	2	2	3	3	3	3	4	4	4	4	5	3	3	2	2	3	3	3	2	2	2	2

Updated to match(es) played on 1 December 2018. Source: Matches
A = Away; H = Home; W = Win; D = Draw; L = Loss

==== Matches ====
Goals and red cards are shown.

14 April 2018 1	Vitória	2–2	Flamengo	Salvador
19:00	Yago 12' (pen.); Denílson 76'		Paquetá 1'; Réver 72'; Ribeiro (red card) 10'	Stadium: Barradão; Attendance: 13,142; Referee: Wagner Reway

21 April 2018 2	Flamengo	2–0	América Mineiro	Rio de Janeiro
19:00	Dourado 28', 35' (pen.)			Stadium: Estádio do Maracanã; Attendance: 52,106; Referee: Leandro Bizzio

29 April 2018 3	Ceará	0–3	Flamengo	Fortaleza
16:00			Vinícius Jr. 42', 53'; Diego 71'	Stadium: Arena Castelão; Attendance: 52,952; Referee: Anderson Daronco

6 May 2018 4	Flamengo	2–0	Internacional	Rio de Janeiro
16:00	Paquetá 71'; Ribeiro 87'		Pottker (red card) 79'	Stadium: Estádio do Maracanã; Attendance: 60,182; Referee: Luiz Flávio de Oliveira

13 May 2018 5	Chapecoense	3–2	Flamengo	Chapecó
16:00	Canteros 23'; Guilherme 68' (pen.); Pereira 90+1'		Guerrero 49'; Vinícius Jr. 78'	Stadium: Arena Condá; Attendance: 10,931; Referee: Leandro Vuaden

19 May 2018 6	Flamengo	1–1	Vasco da Gama	Rio de Janeiro
19:00	Vinícius Jr. 14'; Rhodolfo (red card) 90+5'; Cuéllar (yellow card) 87' (red card) 90+7'		Wágner 18'; Riascos (red card) 90+2'; Breno (red card) 90+5'	Stadium: Estádio do Maracanã; Attendance: 35,208; Referee: Ricardo Marques Ribeiro

26 May 2018 7	Atlético Mineiro	0–1	Flamengo	Belo Horizonte
21:00			Ribeiro 80'	Stadium: Estádio Independência; Attendance: 15,797; Referee: Anderson Daronco

31 May 2018 8	Flamengo	2–0	Bahia	Rio de Janeiro
16:00	Diego 42'; Paquetá 45+1'			Stadium: Estádio do Maracanã; Attendance: 55,382; Referee: Jean Pierre Gonçalves Lima

2 June 2018 9	Flamengo	1–0	Corinthians	Rio de Janeiro
16:00	Vizeu 80'			Stadium: Estádio do Maracanã; Attendance: 49,222; Referee: Anderson Daronco

7 June 2018 10	Fluminense	0–2	Flamengo	Brasília
20:00			Dourado 30' (pen.); Vizeu 79'	Stadium: Estádio Nacional Mané Garrincha; Attendance: 60,000; Referee: Dewson Fernando Silva

10 June 2018 11	Flamengo	2–0	Paraná	Rio de Janeiro
19:00	Diego 21'; Vizeu 66'			Stadium: Estádio do Maracanã; Attendance: 59,488; Referee: Marcelo Aparecido Ribeiro De Souza

13 June 2018 12	Palmeiras	1–1	Flamengo	São Paulo
21:00	Willian 6'; Dudu (red card) 90+6'; Jailson (red card) 90+7'; Luan (red card) 90+7'		Thuler 55'; Cuéllar (red card) 90+6'; Jonas (red card) 90+7'; Dourado (red card) 90+7'	Stadium: Allianz Parque; Attendance: 36,882; Referee: Braulio da Silva Machado

18 July 2018 13	Flamengo	0–1	São Paulo	Rio de Janeiro
21:45			Éverton 48'; Araruna (yellow card) (red card) 56'	Stadium: Estádio do Maracanã; Attendance: 55,986; Referee: Paulo Roberto Jr.

21 July 2018 14	Flamengo	2–0	Botafogo	Rio de Janeiro
19:00	Sávio 5'; Paquetá 7'		Aguirre (red card) 90+3'	Stadium: Estádio do Maracanã; Attendance: 42,182; Referee: Luiz Flávio de Oliveira

25 July 2018 15	Santos	1–1	Flamengo	Santos
21:45	Gabriel 33'		Bruno Henrique 2' (o.g.)	Stadium: Vila Belmiro; Attendance: 11,843; Referee: Jailson Macêdo Freitas

29 July 2018 16	Flamengo	4–1	Sport	Rio de Janeiro
16:00	Réver 14'; Paquetá 48'; Ribeiro 50'; Uribe 63'		Winck 44'	Stadium: Estádio do Maracanã; Attendance: 58,817; Referee: Marcelo Aparecido Ribeiro De Souza

4 August 2018 17	Grêmio	2–0	Flamengo	Porto Alegre
19:00	Jael 45+1'; Marinho 48'			Stadium: Arena do Grêmio; Attendance: 16,588; Referee: Rafael Traci

12 August 2018 18	Flamengo	1–0	Cruzeiro	Rio de Janeiro
16:00	Dourado 23'			Stadium: Estádio do Maracanã; Attendance: 55,276; Referee: Dewson Fernando Silva

19 August 2018 19	Atlético Paranaense	3–0	Flamengo	Curitiba
16:00	Pablo 10'; Veiga 17'; Zé Ivaldo 21'			Stadium: Arena da Baixada; Attendance: 22,061; Referee: Igor Benevenuto

23 August 2018 20	Flamengo	1–0	Vitória	Rio de Janeiro
19:30	Diego 41'			Stadium: Estádio do Maracanã; Attendance: 51,878; Referee: Wilton Pereira Sampaio

26 August 2018 21	América Mineiro	2–2	Flamengo	Belo Horizonte
16:00	Moura 23'; Magrão 87'		Ribeiro 15'; Paquetá 62'; Cuéllar (red card) 65'	Stadium: Estádio Independência; Attendance: 12,886; Referee: Jean Pierre Gonçalves Lima

2 September 2018 22	Flamengo	0–1	Ceará	Rio de Janeiro
11:00			Carvalho 90+1'	Stadium: Estádio do Maracanã; Attendance: 61,277; Referee: Raphael Claus

5 September 2018 23	Internacional	2–1	Flamengo	Porto Alegre
21:45	Pottker 6'; Dourado 59'		Vitinho 57'	Stadium: Estádio Beira-Rio; Attendance: 33,633; Referee: Ricardo Marques Ribeiro

8 September 2018 24	Flamengo	2–0	Chapecoense	Rio de Janeiro
21:00	Renê 44'; Diego 57' (pen.)			Stadium: Estádio do Maracanã; Attendance: 30,647; Referee: Leandro Bizzio

15 September 2018 25	Vasco da Gama	1–1	Flamengo	Brasília
19:00	Andrés Ríos 28'		Diego (red card) 59'; Luiz Gustavo 62' (o.g.)	Stadium: Estádio Nacional Mané Garrincha; Attendance: 54,288; Referee: Luiz Flávio de Oliveira

23 September 2018 26	Flamengo	2–1	Atlético Mineiro	Rio de Janeiro
16:00	Arão 2'; Paquetá 54'		Silva 23'	Stadium: Estádio do Maracanã; Attendance: 39,462; Referee: Rodolpho Toski Marques

29 September 2018 27	Bahia	0–0	Flamengo	Salvador
21:00				Stadium: Itaipava Arena Fonte Nova; Attendance: 31,626; Referee: Igor Benevenuto

5 October 2018 28	Corinthians	0–3	Flamengo	São Paulo
21:00			Paquetá 60', 66'; Renê 90+2'	Stadium: Arena Corinthians; Attendance: 41,943; Referee: Paulo Roberto Jr.

13 October 2018 29	Flamengo	3–0	Fluminenese	Rio de Janeiro
17:00	Uribe 11', 50'; Duarte 45+2'			Stadium: Estádio do Maracanã; Attendance: 52,924; Referee: Wilton Pereira Sampaio

21 October 2018 30	Paraná	0–4	Flamengo	Curitiba
19:00			Paquetá 19'; Vitinho 51'; Uribe 57'; Dourado 90+1'	Stadium: Vila Capanema; Attendance: 5,143; Referee: Braulio da Silva Machado

27 October 2018 31	Flamengo	1–1	Palmeiras	Rio de Janeiro
18:00	Moreno 81'		Dudu 50'	Stadium: Estádio do Maracanã; Attendance: 65,102; Referee: Rafael Traci

4 November 2018 32	São Paulo	2–2	Flamengo	São Paulo
17:00	Souza 8'; Helinho 50'		Uribe 10'; Rodinei 82'	Stadium: Morumbi; Attendance: 32,612; Referee: Wilton Pereira Sampaio

10 November 2018 33	Botafogo	2–1	Flamengo	Rio de Janeiro
19:00	Erik 19'; Valencia 29'		Vitinho 49'	Stadium: Estádio Nilton Santos; Attendance: 19,267; Referee: Braulio da Silva Machado

15 November 2018 34	Flamengo	1–0	Santos	Rio de Janeiro
19:00	Dourado 73'			Stadium: Estádio do Maracanã; Attendance: 46,067; Referee: Paulo Roberto Jr.

18 November 2018 35	Sport	0–1	Flamengo	Recife
19:00			Arão 82'; Paquetá (red card) 61'	Stadium: Ilha do Retiro; Attendance: 26,005; Referee: Rafael Claus

21 November 2018 36	Flamengo	2–0	Grêmio	Rio de Janeiro
21:45	Uribe 47'; Diego 90'			Stadium: Estádio do Maracanã; Attendance: 36,013; Referee: Braulio da Silva Machado

25 November 2018 37	Cruzeiro	0–2	Flamengo	Belo Horizonte
17:00			Ribeiro 8', 52'	Stadium: Estádio do Mineirão; Attendance: 27,616; Referee: Jean Pierre Goncalves Lima

1 December 2018 38	Flamengo	1–2	Atlético Paranaense	Rio de Janeiro
21:00	Rhodolfo 23'; Arão (red card) 83'		Rossetto 65'; Rony 71'; Rony (red card) 84'	Stadium: Estádio do Maracanã; Attendance: 66,046; Referee: Flavio Rodrigues de Souza

=== Copa do Brasil ===
As Flamengo participated in the 2018 Copa Libertadores, the club entered the Copa do Brasil in the round of 16. The draw was held on 20 April 2018.

==== Round of 16 ====
2 May 2018 First leg	Ponte Preta	0–1	Flamengo	Campinas
19:30			Dourado 33'	Stadium: Estádio Moisés Lucarelli; Attendance: 9,789; Referee: Jean Pierre Goncalves Lima

10 May 2018 Second leg	Flamengo	0–0 (1–0 agg.)	Ponte Preta	Rio de Janeiro
19:30				Stadium: Estádio do Maracanã; Attendance: 55,822; Referee: Ricardo Marques Ribeiro

==== Quarterfinals ====
1 August 2018 First leg	Grêmio	1–1	Flamengo	Porto Alegre
21:45	Luan 38'		Lincoln 90+4'	Stadium: Arena do Grêmio; Attendance: 40,075; Referee: Raphael Claus

15 August 2018 Second leg	Flamengo	1–0 (2–1 agg.)	Grêmio	Rio de Janeiro
21:45	Ribeiro 5'			Stadium: Estádio do Maracanã; Attendance: 55,461; Referee: Ricardo Marques

==== Semifinals ====
12 September 2018 First leg	Flamengo	0–0	Corinthians	Rio de Janeiro
21:45				Stadium: Estádio do Maracanã; Attendance: 53,303; Referee: Braulio da Silva Machado

26 September 2018 Second leg	Corinthians	2–1 (2–1 agg.)	Flamengo	São Paulo
21:45	Avelar 14'; Pedrinho 69'		Henrique 18' (o.g.)	Stadium: Arena Corinthians; Attendance: 44,606; Referee: Ricardo Marques Ribeiro

== Statistics ==
Last updated: 1 December 2018.

=== Appearances ===
No.	Pos.	Name	Série A		Copa do Brasil		Libertadores		Carioca		Total	
No.	Pos.	Name	Apps	Starts	Apps	Starts	Apps	Starts	Apps	Starts	Apps	Starts
Goalkeepers
1	GK	(Brazil) Diego Alves	23	23	6	6	8	8	7	7	44	44
22	GK	(Brazil) Gabriel Batista	0	0	0	0	0	0	3	3	3	3
37	GK	(Brazil) César	14	14	0	0	0	0	4	4	18	18
Defenders
2	DF	(Brazil) Rodinei	28	23	5	5	8	7	9	7	50	42
4	DF	(Brazil) Juan	4	4	0	0	5	5	5	5	14	14
6	DF	(Brazil) Renê	34	33	5	5	8	8	11	11	58	57
13	DF	(Peru) Miguel Trauco	6	4	1	1	0	0	3	2	10	7
15	DF	(Brazil) Réver	26	26	6	6	6	6	6	6	44	44
21	DF	(Brazil) Pará	20	16	2	1	2	1	6	6	30	24
26	DF	(Brazil) Matheus Thuler	7	5	0	0	0	0	5	5	12	10
43	DF	(Brazil) Léo Duarte	33	33	6	6	4	3	6	5	49	47
44	DF	(Brazil) Rhodolfo	12	9	0	0	2	2	9	8	23	19
Midfielders
5	MF	(Brazil) Willian Arão	23	15	3	1	3	1	5	2	34	19
7	MF	(Brazil) Éverton Ribeiro	345	34	6	6	7	7	9	9	57	56
8	MF	(Colombia) Gustavo Cuellar	28	27	6	6	6	6	22	6	51	45
10	MF	(Brazil) Diego	26	22	4	4	7	7	9	9	4	42
11	MF	(Brazil) Lucas Paquetá	32	31	6	6	7	7	11	11	56	55
16	MF	(Brazil) Ronaldo	0	0	0	0	0	0	4	4	4	4
18	MF	(Brazil) Jean Lucas	14	4	2	0	2	2	5	3	23	9
22	MF	(Brazil) Matheus Sávio	5	3	0	0	0	0	0	0	5	3
25	MF	(Paraguay) Robert Piris Da Mota	11	6	0	0	0	0	0	0	11	6
27	MF	(Brazil) Rômulo	7	4	1	0	1	0	4	3	13	7
Forwards
14	FW	(Brazil) Vitinho	22	19	4	2	2	1	0	0	28	22
17	FW	(Colombia) Marlos Moreno	21	6	5	1	5	2	4	1	35	10
19	FW	(Brazil) Henrique Dourado	20	16	5	4	7	6	8	8	40	34
20	FW	(Colombia) Fernando Uribe	20	16	2	2	1	1	0	0	23	19
23	FW	(Brazil) Geuvânio	12	3	2	2	3	0	6	1	23	6
28	FW	(Colombia) Orlando Berrío	9	0	0	0	0	0	0	0	9	0
29	FW	(Brazil) Lincoln	9	2	3	0	4	0	6	3	22	5
Players transferred out during the season
9	FW	(Peru) Paolo Guerrero	6	4	1	0	0	0	0	0	7	4
12	GK	(Brazil) Júlio César	1	1	0	0	0	0	1	1	2	2
14	MF	(Brazil) Jonas	7	4	0	0	5	2	11	8	23	14
20	FW	(Brazil) Vinícius Júnior	12	11	2	2	5	4	12	7	31	24
22	MF	(Brazil) Éverton	0	0	0	0	2	2	9	9	11	11
32	MF	(Brazil) Ederson	0	0	0	0	0	0	0	0	0	0
47	FW	(Brazil) Felipe Vizeu	5	1	0	0	0	0	6	3	11	4
50	MF	(Brazil) Jajá	0	0	0	0	0	0	2	0	2	0
Youth players with first-team appearances
31	DF	(Brazil) Kléber	0	0	0	0	0	0	4	2	4	2
46	MF	(Brazil) Hugo Moura	0	0	0	0	0	0	1	0	1	0
52	DF	(Brazil) Patrick	0	0	0	0	0	0	2	1	2	1
53	FW	(Brazil) Lucas Silva	0	0	0	0	0	0	2	2	2	2
54	FW	(Brazil) Vitor Gabriel	0	0	0	0	0	0	2	0	2	0
55	DF	(Brazil) Matheus Dantas	0	0	0	0	0	0	1	0	1	0
57	MF	(Brazil) Pepê	0	0	0	0	0	0	3	1	3	1
—	DF	(Brazil) Ramon	0	0	0	0	0	0	2	1	2	1
—	FW	(Brazil) Wendel	0	0	0	0	0	0	2	1	2	1

=== Goalscorers ===
Players in italics transferred out of the club during the season.

Rank	Pos.	No.	Player	Série A	Copa do Brasil	Libertadores	Carioca	Total
1	MF	11	(Brazil) Lucas Paquetá	10	0	0	2	12
1	FW	19	(Brazil) Henrique Dourado	6	1	2	3	12
3	MF	7	(Brazil) Éverton Ribeiro	6	1	2	1	10
3	FW	20	(Brazil) Vinícius Júnior	4	0	2	4	10
5	MF	10	(Brazil) Diego	6	0	0	2	8
6	FW	20	(Colombia) Fernando Uribe	6	0	0	—	6
7	FW	14	(Brazil) Vitinho	3	0	0	—	3
7	FW	47	(Brazil) Felipe Vizeu	3	—	—	0	3
7	DF	44	(Brazil) Rhodolfo	1	—	0	2	3
7	MF	22	(Brazil) Éverton	—	—	1	2	3
11	DF	6	(Brazil) Renê	2	0	0	0	2
11	MF	5	(Brazil) Willian Arão	2	0	0	0	2
11	DF	15	(Brazil) Réver	2	0	0	0	2
11	DF	2	(Brazil) Rodinei	1	0	0	1	2
11	DF	43	(Brazil) Léo Duarte	1	0	1	0	2
11	FW	29	(Brazil) Lincoln	0	1	0	1	2
11	FW	23	(Brazil) Geuvânio	0	0	0	2	2
18	FW	17	(Colombia) Marlos Moreno	1	0	0	0	1
18	MF	22	(Brazil) Matheus Sávio	1	—	—	—	1
18	DF	26	(Brazil) Matheus Thuler	1	—	—	0	1
18	FW	9	(Peru) Paolo Guerrero	1	0	—	—	1
18	FW	53	(Brazil) Lucas Silva	—	—	—	1	1
18	MF	57	(Brazil) Pepê	—	—	—	1	1
Own Goals				2	1	0	1	4
Total				59	4	8	23	94

=== Clean sheets ===
Rank	Player	Série A	Copa do Brasil	Libertadores	Carioca	Total
1	(Brazil) Diego Alves	11 / 23	4 / 6	4 / 8	3 / 7	22 / 44
2	(Brazil) César	8 / 14	—	—	3 / 4	11 / 18
3	(Brazil) Gabriel Batista	—	—	—	3 / 3	3 / 3
4	(Brazil) Júlio César	1 / 1	—	—	1 / 1	2 / 2
Total		20 / 38	4 / 6	4 / 8	10 / 15	38 / 67

=== Disciplinary record ===
Players in italics transferred out of the club during the season.

Pos.	No.	Player	Série A		Copa do Brasil		Libertadores		Carioca		Total	
Pos.	No.	Player	Yellow card	Red card	Yellow card	Red card	Yellow card	Red card	Yellow card	Red card	Yellow card	Red card
MF	10	(Brazil) Diego	10	1	1	0	4	0	3	0	18	1
MF	11	(Brazil) Lucas Paquetá	9	1	1	0	3	0	4	0	17	1
DF	6	(Brazil) Renê	7	0	1	0	2	0	1	0	11	0
MF	8	(Colombia) Gustavo Cuéllar	6	3	0	0	2	0	3	1	11	4
FW	19	(Brazil) Henrique Dourado	6	0	1	0	2	0	2	0	11	0
DF	43	(Brazil) Léo Duarte	3	0	0	0	1	0	3	1	7	1
MF	5	(Brazil) Willian Arão	6	1	1	0	0	0	0	0	7	1
MF	7	(Brazil) Éverton Ribeiro	5	1	0	0	0	0	1	0	6	1
GK	1	(Brazil) Diego Alves	2	0	1	0	1	0	1	0	5	0
FW	17	(Colombia) Marlos Moreno	3	0	1	0	0	0	1	0	5	0
FW	20	(Brazil) Vinícius Júnior	3	0	0	0	0	0	2	0	5	0
MF	14	(Brazil) Jonas	2	0	0	0	0	0	3	0	5	0
DF	2	(Brazil) Rodinei	3	0	0	0	1	0	0	0	4	0
DF	15	(Brazil) Réver	1	0	1	0	1	0	1	0	4	0
DF	21	(Brazil) Pará	4	0	0	0	0	0	0	0	4	0
MF	18	(Brazil) Jean Lucas	1	0	0	0	1	0	1	0	3	0
MF	22	(Brazil) Éverton	0	0	0	0	2	0	1	0	3	0
MF	25	(Paraguay) Robert Piris Da Motta	3	0	0	0	0	0	0	0	3	0
FW	14	(Brazil) Vitinho	2	0	0	0	0	0	0	0	2	0
DF	44	(Brazil) Rhodolfo	2	0	0	0	0	0	0	0	2	0
FW	23	(Brazil) Geuvânio	2	0	0	0	0	0	0	0	2	0
MF	27	(Brazil) Rômulo	1	0	0	0	0	0	1	0	2	0
FW	47	(Brazil) Felipe Vizeu	2	0	0	0	0	0	0	0	2	0
FW	20	(Colombia) Fernando Uribe	1	0	0	0	0	0	0	0	1	0
FW	29	(Brazil) Lincoln	0	0	1	0	0	0	0	0	1	0
GK	37	(Brazil) César	1	0	0	0	0	0	0	0	1	0
DF	4	(Brazil) Juan	1	0	0	0	0	0	0	0	1	0
DF	26	(Brazil) Matheus Thuler	1	0	0	0	0	0	0	0	1	0
MF	16	(Brazil) Ronaldo	0	0	0	0	0	0	1	0	1	0
MF	57	(Brazil) Pepê	0	0	0	0	0	0	1	0	1	0
Total			89	7	9	0	20	0	30	2	148	9

== Honors ==
=== Individuals ===
Name	Number	Country	Award
Lucas Paquetá	11	(Brazil)	Campeonato Brasileiro Série A Team of the Year Campeonato Carioca Team of the Year
Renê	6	(Brazil)	Campeonato Brasileiro Série A Team of the Year
Gustavo Cuéllar	8	(Colombia)	Campeonato Brasileiro Série A Fan-Voted Player of the Year
Éverton Ribeiro	7	(Brazil)	Campeonato Brasileiro Série A Goal of the Year

== Attendance ==
Includes all competition home matches in the 2018 season. Attendances recorded represent actual gate attendance, not paid attendance.

Source: Globo

=== Campeonato Brasileiro ===
Stadium	Matches	Average	Highest attendance	Lowest attendance
Estádio do Maracanã	19	49,303	66,046	33,633
Total	19	49,303	936,759	

=== Copa do Brasil ===
Stadium	Matches	Average	Highest attendance	Lowest attendance
Estádio do Maracanã	3	54,862	55,822	53,303
Total	3	54,862	164,586	

=== Copa Libertadores ===
Stadium	Matches	Average	Highest attendance	Lowest attendance
Estádio do Maracanã	2	43,178	45,967	40,390
Total	2	43,178	86,357	

=== Campeonato Carioca ===
Stadium	Matches	Average	Highest attendance	Lowest attendance
Estádio do Maracanã	2	23,466	28,345	18,587
Estádio Nilton Santos	2	5,630	7,396	3,865
Ilha do Urubu	2	3,554	3,777	3,332
Estádio Kléber Andrade	1	4,757	4,757	4,757
Estádio Raulino de Oliveira	1	5,460	5,460	5,460
Total	8	9,440	75,519	
