= Mithyuê =

Brazilian footballer and futsal player (born 1989)

Personal information
- Full name: Mithyuê de Linhares
- Date of birth: 16 October 1989 (age 37)
- Place of birth: Chapecó, Brazil
- Height: 1.73 m (5 ft 8 in)
- Position: Attacking midfielder

Team information
- Current team: Jaén Paraíso Interior FS
- Number: 17

Youth career
- 2007–2008: Joinville (futsal)
- 2009: Grêmio

Senior career*
Years	Team	Apps	(Gls)
2007–2008	Joinville (futsal)		(21)
2009–2014	Grêmio	3	(0)
2010	→ Atlético Paranaense (loan)	4	(0)
2012	→ Juventude (loan)	0	(0)
2013	→ CSA (loan)	14	(3)
2013–2014	→ Pelotas (loan)	16	(4)
2014–2016	Joinville	52	(22)
2016	Sorocaba		
2017–	Carlos Barbosa		

International career
2007–2008	Brazil (futsal)	15	(5)
- * Club domestic league appearances and goals as of 1 December 2016

Mithyuê de Souza Linhares (born 16 October 1989) or simply Mithyuê, is a Brazilian retired footballer and a current futsal player, who plays for Jaén Paraíso Interior FS. He is the cousin of fellow futsal player Sérgio Jamur.

== Career ==
=== Futsal career ===
Mithyuê was born in Chapecó, and started to play futsal at the age of six. He became a professional when he turned 17, playing for Joinville in Liga Futsal. He soon became well known in Brazil as the successor of Falcão, the best futsal player in the world. Mithyuê lead his team to a league runner-up campaign, scoring 13 goals, and was named rookie of the year and the best flanks position player, alongside Falcão. Also in 2007, he earned his first cap for the Brazil national futsal team, at age of 17, making him one of the youngest players ever to receive a cap. In the 2008 edition of Liga Futsal, he scored eight goals and JEC earned a 7th place.

=== Moving to football ===
==== Grêmio ====
In May 2008, Mithyuê was invited for the retired Brazil international midfielder Paulo César Carpegiani to make a trial in football for Grêmio. He accepted the challenge and signed 3-month trial deal to play for the youth team. Mithyuê's rising in football lead the club to extend his contract and he is expected to play for the first team in 2009.

In May 2012, claiming lack of opportunities, Mithyuê decided to switch back to futsal and is looking for a friendly termination of his contract with Grêmio.
