= Sueliton =

Sueliton is a name. Notable people with the name include:

== Given name ==
- Sueliton (footballer, born 1986), full name Sueliton Pereira de Aguiar, Brazilian football right-back
- Suéliton (footballer, born 1991), full name Suéliton Florencio Nogueira, Brazilian football centre-back

== See also ==
- Suelton (born 1991), full name Suelton Marques de Souza, Brazilian futsal player
