= Sérgio Jamur =

Brazilian futsal player

Personal information
- Full name: Sérgio Jamur de Souza
- Date of birth: 12 September 1990 (age 36)
- Place of birth: Chapecó, Brazil
- Height: 1.78 m (5 ft 10 in)
- Position: Winger

Team information
- Current team: Pahang Rangers
- Number: 22

Youth career
- Jaraguá

Senior career*
Years	Team	Apps	(Gls)
2006–2007	Jaraguá		
2008–2009	AFF		
2010	Jaraguá		
2011	Caxias (football)		
2011	Campo Mourão		
2011	Copagril		
2012	Rio do Sul		
2012	ADV		
2013	ALAF		
2014	Guarapuava		
2015	Sorocaba		
2015	Keima Futsal		
2015	Ponta Grossa		
2015–2016	Qadsia SC		
2016–2017	Acqua e Sapone		
2017	Pato Futsal	11	(8)
2018	Foz Cataratas	18	(9)
2019	Copagril	5	(1)
2023–	Pahang Rangers		

International career^{‡}
- Brazil U20
2018–	Brazil		
- * Club domestic league appearances and goals as of 00:00, 17 Jul 2023 (UTC) ‡ National team caps and goals as of 00:00, 30 May 2019 (UTC)

Sérgio Jamur de Souza (born 12 September 1990) is a Brazilian futsal player who plays as a winger for Pahang Rangers and the Brazilian national futsal team. He is the cousin of fellow futsal player Mithyuê.
