= Patrick (footballer, born 2000) =

Brazilian footballer

Personal information
- Full name: Patrick da Silva Ferreira Souza
- Date of birth: 28 February 2000 (age 26)
- Place of birth: Rio de Janeiro, Brazil
- Height: 1.85 m (6 ft 1 in)
- Position: Centre-back

Team information
- Current team: Joinville

Youth career
- 2015–2019: Flamengo
- 2019: → Midtjylland (loan)

Senior career*
Years	Team	Apps	(Gls)
2018–2022	Flamengo	2	(0)
2019–2020	→ Midtjylland (loan)	0	(0)
2022	→ Tombense (loan)	1	(0)
2023	Bangu	11	(0)
2023–	Joinville	0	(0)

International career
- Brazil U15
2017	Brazil U17	2	(0)
- * Club domestic league appearances and goals as of 19:41, 10 April 2023 (UTC)

Patrick da Silva Ferreira Souza (born 28 February 2000), commonly known as Patrick, is a Brazilian footballer who plays as a centre-back for Joinville.

== Career ==
=== Flamengo ===
==== FC Midtjylland (loan) ====
On 31 January 2019, Danish Superliga club FC Midtjylland confirmed, that they had signed Patrick on a 18-month loan deal with an option to buy.

== Career statistics ==
=== Club ===
As of 1 July 2019.

Club	Season	League			State League		Cup		Continental		Other		Total	
Club	Season	Division	Apps	Goals	Apps	Goals	Apps	Goals	Apps	Goals	Apps	Goals	Apps	Goals!
Flamengo	2018	Série A	0	0	2 (Note: Appearance(s) in Campeonato Carioca)	0	0	0	–		0	0	2	0
Flamengo	2019	Série A	0	0	0	0	0	0	0	0	0	0	0	0
Flamengo	Total		0	0	2	0	0	0	0	0	0	0	2	0
FC Midtjylland (loan)	2018–19	Superliga	0	0	–		0	0	0	0	0	0	0	0
FC Midtjylland (loan)	2019–20	Superliga	0	0	–		0	0	0	0	0	0	0	0
FC Midtjylland (loan)	Total		0	0	0	0	0	0	0	0	0	0	0	0
Tombense	2022	Série B	0	0	1 (Note: Appearance(s) in Campeonato Mineiro)	0	0	0	–		0	0	1	0
Tombense	Total	Série B	0	0	1	0	0	0	0	0	0	0	1	0
Career total			0	0	3	0	0	0	0	0	0	0	3	0
