= Lucas Silva (footballer, born 1998) =

Brazilian footballer

Personal information
- Full name: Lucas da Silva de Jesus
- Date of birth: 30 January 1998 (age 28)
- Place of birth: Rio de Janeiro, Brazil
- Height: 1.76 m (5 ft 9 in)
- Position: Winger

Team information
- Current team: Thep Xanh Nam Dinh
- Number: 30

Youth career
- 2015–2018: Flamengo

Senior career*
Years	Team	Apps	(Gls)
2018–2020	Flamengo	20	(2)
2020–2022	Paços de Ferreira	40	(3)
2022–2023	Avaí	13	(0)
2023	Guarani	14	(0)
2024	Torreense	16	(1)
2024–2025	Thep Xanh Nam Dinh	9	(3)
- * Club domestic league appearances and goals as of 20 June 2024

Lucas da Silva de Jesus (born 30 January 1998) is a Brazilian professional footballer who plays as a winger for V.League 1 club Thep Xanh Nam Dinh.

== Career ==
=== Early career ===
Born in Rio de Janeiro, Silva graduated from Flamengo's youth setup. In his youth career he won several important titles such as Copa São Paulo de Futebol Júnior, Campeonato Carioca U20 and Torneio Otávio Pinto Guimarães alongside teammates Vitor Gabriel, Pepê, Hugo Moura, Matheus Dantas, Matheus Thuler and Gabriel Batista.

=== Flamengo ===
==== 2018 season ====
On 18 January 2018, Silva made his professional debut and scored his first senior goal in a 2–0 win against Volta Redonda, in Campeonato Carioca. In April 2018, Silva suffered an ankle injury and returned to play in October in a Brasileiro under-20 match against Vasco da Gama.

==== 2019 season ====
In the beginning of the season Silva had few opportunities in the team having five appearances in the 2019 Campeonato Carioca. On 14 April Silva played his first continental match, a 6–1 Copa Libertadores win against San José at Maracanã Stadium, replacing Éverton Ribeiro in the 81st minute. On 1 May Silva debuted at Brazilian Série A, he replaced Willian Arão in the 79th minute against Internacional at Beira-Rio Stadium, Flamengo lost 2–1.

=== Paços de Ferreira ===
Having fallen out of favor at Flamengo, Lucas Silva had his contract terminated and signed with Paços de Ferreira in Portugal for a three-year term. The transfer fee was not disclosed. He scored his first goal for the club on August 9, in a 2–0 victory over Famalicão in the opening match of the Primeira Liga.

He scored his club's sole goal in a 1-0 win over Tottenham in the first leg of the UEFA Europa Conference League playoffs, a new tournament introduced by the UEFA this season. He participated in 49 appearances for the club, scoring four goals.

=== Avaí ===
On 16 August 2022, Silva left Paços de Ferreira and returned to Brazil, signing a one-and-a-half-year contract with Série A side Avaí.

=== Guarani ===
On 31 March 2023, Silva terminated his contract with Avaí and dropped down to Série B, joining Guarani.

=== Torreense ===
On 1 January 2024, Silva returned to Portugal, joining Liga Portugal 2 club Torreense.

== Career statistics ==
As of match played 25 November 2023

Appearances and goals by club, season and competition
Club	Season	League			State league		National cup		League cup		Continental		Total	
Club	Season	Division	Apps	Goals	Apps	Goals	Apps	Goals	Apps	Goals	Apps	Goals	Apps	Goals
Flamengo	2018	Série A	0	0	2 (Note: Appearances in Campeonato Carioca)	1	0	0	—		0	0	2	1
Flamengo	2019	Série A	9	0	5	0	0	0	—		2 (Note: Appearances in Copa Libertadores)	0	16	0
Flamengo	2020	Série A	0	0	4	1	0	0	—		0	0	4	1
Flamengo	Total		9	0	11	2	0	0	—		2	0	22	2
Paços de Ferreira	2020–21	Primeira Liga	6	0	—		0	0	1	0	—		7	0
Paços de Ferreira	2021–22	Primeira Liga	33	3	—		1	0	3	0	4 (Note: Appearances in UEFA Europa Conference League)	1	41	4
Paços de Ferreira	2022–23	Primeira Liga	1	0	—		0	0	0	0	—		1	0
Paços de Ferreira	Total		40	3	—		1	0	4	0	4	1	49	4
Avaí	2022	Série A	6	0	0	0	0	0	—		—		6	0
Avaí	2023	Série B	0	0	7 (Note: Appearances in Campeonato Catarinense)	0	1	1	—		—		8	1
Avaí	Total		6	0	7	0	1	1	—		—		14	1
Guarani	2023	Série B	14	0	0	0	—		—		—		14	0
Torreense	2023–24	Liga Portugal 2	0	0	—		0	0	0	0	—		0	0
Career total			69	3	18	2	2	1	4	0	6	1	99	7

== Honours ==
Flamengo

- Copa Libertadores: 2019
- Recopa Sudamericana: 2020
- Campeonato Brasileiro Série A: 2019
- Supercopa do Brasil: 2020
- Campeonato Carioca: 2019

Thep Xanh Nam Dinh

- Vietnamese Super Cup: 2024
