= Maurício Barbieri =

Brazilian football coach

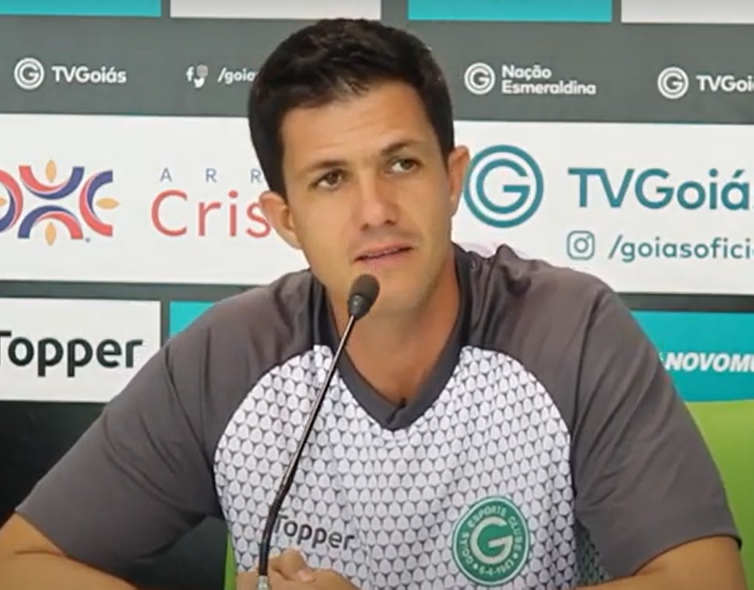
- Barbieri in 2019

Personal information
- Full name: Maurício Nogueira Barbieri
- Date of birth: 30 September 1981 (age 45)
- Place of birth: São Paulo, Brazil

Team information
- Current team: Juventude (head coach)

Managerial career
- Years: Team
- 2004–2010: Pão de Açúcar (youth)
- 2010–2011: Audax (assistant)
- 2011–2013: Audax Rio
- 2014–2016: Red Bull Brasil
- 2017: Guarani
- 2017–2018: Desportivo Brasil
- 2018: Flamengo (assistant)
- 2018: Flamengo
- 2019: Goiás
- 2019: América Mineiro
- 2020: CSA
- 2020–2022: Red Bull Bragantino
- 2023: Vasco da Gama
- 2024: Juárez
- 2025: Athletico Paranaense
- 2026–: Juventude

Maurício Nogueira Barbieri (born 30 September 1981) is a Brazilian professional football coach, currently the head coach of Juventude.

== Career ==
=== Early career ===
Born in São Paulo, Barbieri began his professional career at Pão de Açúcar in 2004, working with the youth setup. In 2010 he was promoted to the first team as an assistant coach.

On 20 September 2011, Barbieri was named head coach of Audax Rio, and managed to achieve promotion to the first division of the Campeonato Carioca in the following year, as runner-up. On 12 November 2013, he was announced at the helm of Red Bull Brasil.

After achieving promotion from Campeonato Paulista Série A2 and taking the club to their first national championship of their history, Barbieri renewed his contract for a further year on 21 September 2015. He left the club in the end of his contract.

=== Guarani ===
On 20 February 2017, Barbieri replaced departing Ney da Matta at Guarani. On 23 March, after just six matches in charge, he left the club.

=== Flamengo ===
Barbieri was subsequently in charge of Desportivo Brasil before leaving the club on 9 January 2018, after accepting an offer from Flamengo. Initially an assistant to Paulo César Carpegiani, he was appointed interim coach on 30 March 2018.

On 29 June 2018, after 19 matches in charge, Barbieri was definitely appointed as head coach until the end of the year. He was dismissed on 28 September, after being in charge of the club for 39 matches overall.

=== Goiás ===
Barbieri appointed head coach of newly promoted side Goiás on 1 December 2018, replacing departed Ney Franco. He was himself sacked the following 21 April, after losing the year's Campeonato Goiano.

=== América Mineiro ===
On 6 May 2019, Barbieri was announced as head coach of América Mineiro. On 15 July, after a 4–0 loss to Figueirense and only one win in seven matches, he was sacked.

=== CSA ===
Barbieri was appointed in charge of CSA on 10 December 2019, but was dismissed the following 10 February after only six matches in charge.

=== Red Bull Bragantino ===
On 2 September 2020, Barbieri took over Red Bull Bragantino in the top tier, replacing fired Felipe Conceição. After picking up the team in the 17th position, he managed to achieve a final 10th position in the season, qualifying to the 2021 Copa Sudamericana.

Barbieri reached the final of the Copa Sudamericana with Braga in 2021, but lost to Athletico Paranaense. On 10 November 2022, after a disappointing season overall, he was sacked.

=== Vasco da Gama ===
On 6 December 2022, Barbieri was named the new head coach of Vasco da Gama, also in the top tier. He was sacked on 23 June 2023, with the club in the relegation zone of the 2023 Série A.

=== Juárez ===
On 9 February 2024, Barbieri moved abroad for the first time in his career, after being appointed manager of Liga MX side Juárez. On 29 October, he was dismissed.

=== Athletico Paranaense ===
On 16 December 2024, Barbieri was named head coach of Athletico Paranaense, recently relegated to the second division. The following 4 May, he was sacked after a 4–1 home loss to Botafogo-SP.

=== Juventude ===
On 11 December 2025, Barbieri took over fellow second division side Juventude on a one-year contract.

== Coaching statistics ==
As of 15 November 2026

Coaching record by team and tenure
Team	Nat	From	To	Record								Ref
Team	Nat	From	To	G	W	D	L	GF	GA	GD	Win %	Ref
Audax Rio	(Brazil)	20 September 2011	12 November 2013	88	43	21	24	127	95	+32	48.86	
Red Bull Brasil	(Brazil)	12 November 2013	31 December 2016	78	36	19	23	114	98	+16	46.15	
Guarani	(Brazil)	20 February 2017	23 March 2017	6	1	4	1	7	7	+0	16.67	
Desportivo Brasil	(Brazil)	22 June 2017	9 January 2018	17	9	3	5	23	16	+7	52.94	
Flamengo	(Brazil)	30 March 2018	28 September 2018	38	18	12	8	46	28	+18	47.37	
Goiás	(Brazil)	1 December 2018	21 April 2019	20	14	2	4	34	16	+18	70.00	
América Mineiro	(Brazil)	1 May 2019	15 July 2019	7	1	2	4	6	12	−6	14.29	
CSA	(Brazil)	10 December 2019	10 February 2020	6	2	1	3	7	9	−2	33.33	
Red Bull Bragantino	(Brazil)	2 September 2020	10 November 2022	160	63	47	50	218	190	+28	39.38	
Vasco da Gama	(Brazil)	6 December 2022	23 June 2023	24	9	4	11	36	31	+5	37.50	
Juárez	(Mexico)	8 February 2024	29 October 2024	28	8	4	16	38	55	−17	28.57	
Athletico Paranaense	(Brazil)	16 December 2024	4 May 2025	24	12	7	5	37	24	+13	50.00	
Juventude	(Brazil)	11 December 2025	present	60	28	19	13	80	46	+34	46.67	
Total				555	243	145	167	770	626	+144	43.78	—
