= Grillo (futsal player) =

Brazilian futsal player

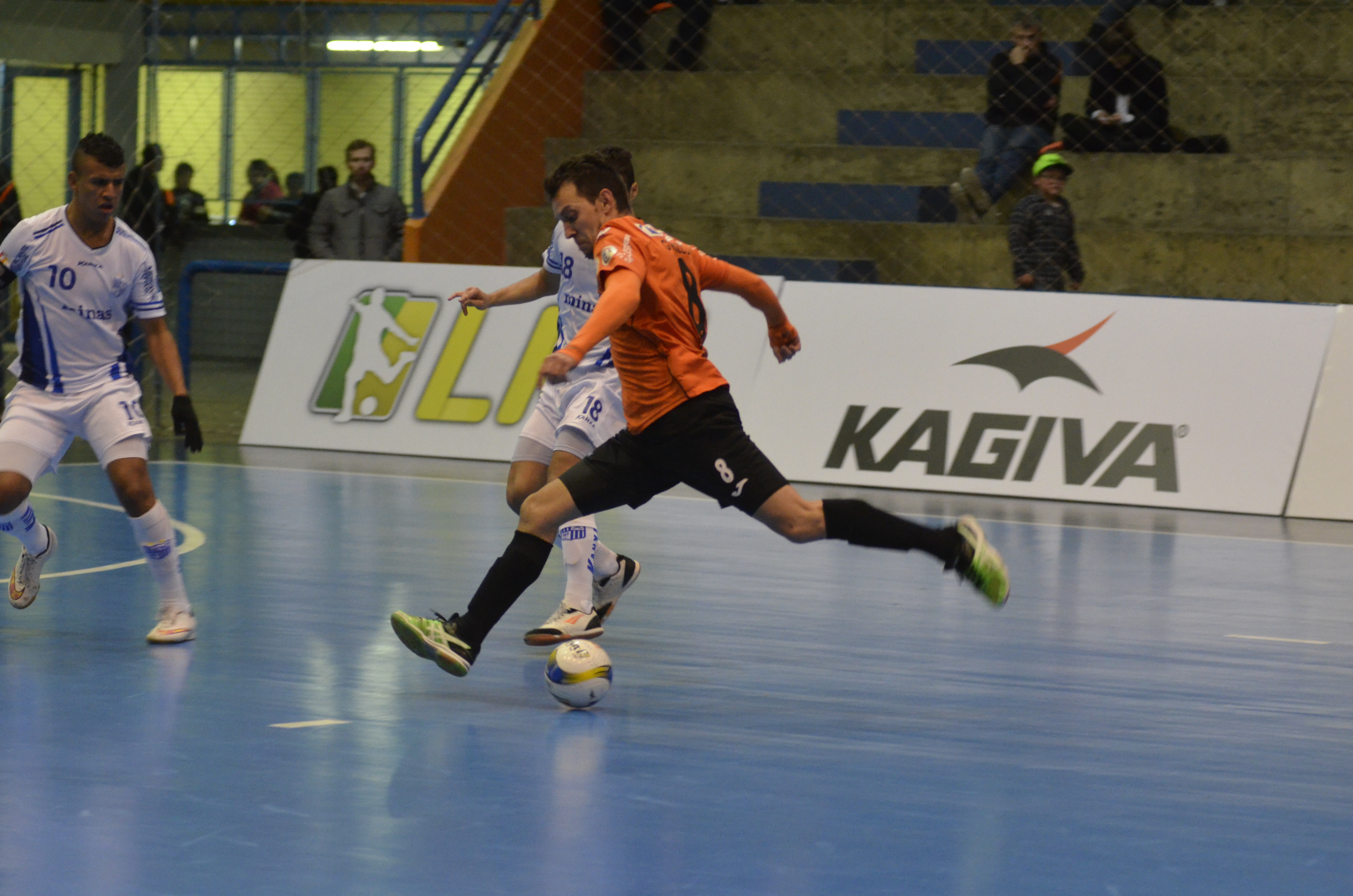

Personal information
- Full name: Eduardo Reis
- Date of birth: 17 November 1986 (age 39)
- Place of birth: Iporã do Oeste, Brazil
- Position: Defender

Team information
- Current team: Copagril
- Number: 17

Senior career*
Years	Team	Apps	(Gls)
2008–2013	Atlântico		
2014–2016	Carlos Barbosa		
2017	Atlântico	16	(7)
2018	Joinville	13	(2)
2019–	Copagril		

International career
2013–	Brazil		
- * Club domestic league appearances and goals as of 00:00, 27 February 2019 (UTC)

Eduardo Reis (born 17 November 1986), commonly known as Grillo, is a Brazilian futsal player who plays as a defender for Copagril and the Brazilian national futsal team.
