= Copagril Futsal =

Brazilian futsal club

- Full name: Associação Atlética Cultural Copagril
- Founded: 6 September 1974; 50 years ago
- Ground: Ginásio de Esportes Ney Braga
- Capacity: 4,200
- Chairman: Enoir José Primon
- Manager: Fernando Malafaia
- League: Liga Futsal
- 2018: Overall table: 7th Playoffs: Semi-finals
colours	colours

Associação Atlética Cultural Copagril, is a Brazilian sports club based in Marechal Cândido Rondon. It was founded in 1974 by the Cooperativa Agroindustrial Copagril, an industrial farming cooperative from western Paraná and southern Mato Grosso do Sul. Its futsal team currently plays in Liga Futsal.

== Club honours ==
=== National competitions ===
- Jogos Abertos Brasileiros (1) 2008

=== State competitions ===
- Chave Ouro (3): 2009, 2013, 2016
- Chave Prata (1) 2004
- Chave Bronze (1): 2001
- Taça Paraná de Futsal (3): 2009, 2010, 2012
- Jogos Abertos do Paraná (2): 2007, 2008
- Torneio dos Campeões de Futsal do Paraná (1): 2014

== Current squad ==
As of 23 May 2019

#	Position	Name	Nationality
2	Goalkeeper	André Deko	(Brazil)
4	Winger	Inácio Kratz	(Brazil)
5	Winger	João Perachi	(Brazil)
7	Winger	Sérgio Jamur	(Brazil)
8	Pivot	Well Pereira	(Brazil)
11	Winger	Eduardo Jabá	(Brazil)
12	Pivot	Bruno Petry	(Brazil)
13	Winger	Pixote	(Brazil)
14	Winger	Lucas Hansel	(Brazil)
17	Defender	Grillo	(Brazil)
19	Goalkeeper	Rennan Cabral	(Brazil)
20	Goalkeeper	Gustavo Pagliari	(Brazil)
22	Winger	Suelton Souza	(Brazil)
77	Defender	Biel	(Brazil)
88	Defender	Guilherme Meira	(Brazil)
93	Pivot	Rafael Vilela	(Azerbaijan)
