= Gabriel Kazu =

Brazilian footballer (born 1999)

Personal information
- Full name: Gabriel Kazu Rossato Yanagu
- Date of birth: 9 June 1999 (age 27)
- Place of birth: Seki, Japan
- Height: 1.80 m (5 ft 11 in)
- Position: Midfielder

Team information
- Current team: Tombense

Youth career
- 2015–2016: Luverdense

Senior career*
Years	Team	Apps	(Gls)
2016–2018	Luverdense	11	(0)
2018–2019	Flamengo	0	(0)
2019–	Tombense	0	(0)
2020	→ Paraná (loan)	14	(0)
2021	→ Luverdense (loan)	0	(0)
2021–2022	→ Avaí (loan)	4	(0)

International career^{‡}
2017	Brazil U20	3	(0)
- * Club domestic league appearances and goals as of 15:54, 8 December 2022 (UTC) ‡ National team caps and goals as of 22:51, 5 July 2019 (UTC)

Gabriel Kazu Rossato Yanagu (born 9 June 1999), commonly known as Kazu, is a Brazilian footballer who plays as a midfielder for Tombense.

== Early life ==
Kazu was born in Seki, Gifu Prefecture to a Japanese-Brazilian father and an Italian-Brazilian mother. His parents were injured in a car accident in 1998, and spent their life savings to pay the hospital bills. Kazu's father moved his family to his ancestral Japan to work as dekasegis to rebuild their life. Kazu was named after Japanese international footballer Kazuyoshi Miura.

== Career ==
=== Flamengo ===
On 14 February 2018 Flamengo signed Kazu from Luverdense on a free transfer, although the two parts agreed that Luverdense would keep 30% of this economic rights. In his first year at the club he was kept as a member of the under-20 team.

=== Tombense ===
Kazu left Flamengo at the end of 2019 where his contract expired and had already signed a pre-contract with Tombense in December 2019. He was immediately loaned out to Paraná Clube for the 2020 season.

== International career ==
Kazu was called up to the Brazil under-20 squad for the 2017 Toulon Tournament. He played 45 minutes before being replaced by Igor in a 1–0 win over Indonesia.

== Career statistics ==
=== Club ===
As of 5 July 2019.

Club	Season	League			State League		Cup		Continental		Other		Total	
Club	Season	Division	Apps	Goals	Apps	Goals	Apps	Goals	Apps	Goals	Apps	Goals	Apps	Goals
Luverdense	2016	Série B	5	0	0	0	0	0	–		0	0	5	0
Luverdense	2017	Série B	6	0	0	0	4 (Note: Appearances in the Copa do Brasil)	0	–		4 (Note: Appearances in the Copa Verde)	0	14	0
Luverdense	2018	Série B	0	0	0	0	0	0	–		1	0	1	0
Luverdense	Total		11	0	0	0	4	0	0	0	5	0	20	0
Flamengo	2018	Série A	0	0	0	0	0	0	0	0	0	0	0	0
Flamengo	2019	Série A	0	0	0	0	0	0	0	0	0	0	0	0
Flamengo	Total		0	0	0	0	0	0	0	0	0	0	0	0
Tombense	2020	Série C	0	0	0	0	0	0	0	0	0	0	0	0
Paraná (loan)	2020	Série B	0	0	8 (Note: Appearances in the Campeonato Paranaense)	0	0	0	0	0	0	0	8	0
Total			11	0	8	0	9	0	0	0	0	0	28	0
