= Suelton =

Brazilian futsal player

Personal information
- Full name: Suelton Marques de Souza
- Date of birth: 26 June 1991 (age 35)
- Place of birth: Guarabira, Brazil
- Height: 1.79 m (5 ft 10 in)
- Position: Winger

Team information
- Current team: Atlântico Futsal
- Number: 22

Youth career
- João Machado
- SESC-PB
- –2008: Benfica FC
- 2009: São Caetano
- 2010: Botafogo-PB
- 2011: Treze

Senior career*
Years	Team	Apps	(Gls)
2010	Botafogo-PB		
2012	Bento Gonçalves		
2013	Copagril		
2014–2017	Marreco		
2018–	Copagril	27	(17)

International career^{‡}
2018–	Brazil		
- * Club domestic league appearances and goals as of 00:00, 21 May 2019 (UTC) ‡ National team caps and goals as of 00:00, 21 May 2019 (UTC)

Suelton Marques de Souza (born 26 June 1991) is a Brazilian futsal player who plays for Copagril and the Brazilian national futsal team as a winger.
