= Vinícius Matheus =

Brazilian footballer

Personal information
- Full name: Vinícius Gonçalves Matheus
- Date of birth: 6 June 1994 (age 32)
- Place of birth: Nova Iguaçu, Brazil
- Height: 1.74 m (5 ft 9 in)
- Position: Midfielder

Team information
- Current team: Nova Iguaçu

Youth career
- –2015: Nova Iguaçu

Senior career*
Years	Team	Apps	(Gls)
2015–2018	Nova Iguaçu	46	(0)
2019	Goiânia	10	(0)
2019	SC Sagamihara	7	(0)
2020–	Nova Iguaçu	31	(0)
- * Club domestic league appearances and goals as of 16:14, 30 March 2021 (UTC)

Vinícius Gonçalves Matheus (born 6 June 1994) is a Brazilian footballer who currently plays as a midfielder for Nova Iguaçu.

== Career statistics ==
=== Club ===
As of 30 March 2021.

Club	Season	League			State League		Cup		Other		Total	
Club	Season	Division	Apps	Goals	Apps	Goals	Apps	Goals	Apps	Goals	Apps	Goals
Nova Iguaçu	2015	–			6 (Note: Appearances in the Campeonato Carioca)	0	0	0	6 (Note: Appearances in the Copa Rio (state cup))	0	12	0
Nova Iguaçu	2016	–			12 (Note: Appearances in the Campeonato Carioca A2)	0	0	0	0	0	12	0
Nova Iguaçu	2017	–			14	0	0	0	0	0	14	0
Nova Iguaçu	2018	Série D	5	0	9	0	1 (Note: Appearances in the Copa do Brasil)	0	0	0	15	0
Nova Iguaçu	Total		5	0	41	0	1	0	0	0	47	0
Goiânia	2019	–			10 (Note: Appearances in the Campeonato Goiano)	0	0	0	0	0	10	0
SC Sagamihara	2019	J3 League	7	0	–		0	0	0	0	7	0
Nova Iguaçu	2020	–			20	0	0	0	0	0	20	0
Nova Iguaçu	2021	–			11	0	0	0	0	0	11	0
Nova Iguaçu	Total		0	0	31	0	0	0	0	0	31	0
Career total			12	0	82	0	1	0	0	0	95	0
