= Vitor Gabriel (footballer, born 1997) =

Brazilian footballer

Personal information
- Full name: Vitor Gabriel Alves Nery
- Date of birth: 23 November 1997 (age 28)
- Place of birth: Arinos, Brazil
- Height: 1.66 m (5 ft 5 1/2 in)
- Position: Winger

Team information
- Current team: Académica
- Number: 33

Youth career
- –2016: Goiás
- 2016–2018: Santos

Senior career*
Years	Team	Apps	(Gls)
2018–2020	Gainare Tottori	41	(10)
2020	Manama Club		
2020–2021	Al-Riffa		
2021–2023	Mafra	46	(2)
2023–	Académica	18	(1)
- * Club domestic league appearances and goals as of 1 July 2024

Vitor Gabriel Alves Nery (born 23 November 1997) is a Brazilian professional footballer who plays as a winger for Portuguese Liga 3 club Académica.

== Career ==
Vitor Gabriel grew in the Santos youth ranks and then he was loaned to the B-team. Gainare Tottori wanted to scout him, so GM Masayuki Okano and returning Fernandinho went to Brazil to see with their own eyes the winger and another player, Leonardo. In January 2018, the Tottori-based club signed both class '97 for their incoming 2018 season.

On 29 June 2021, he signed a two-year contract with Liga Portugal 2 club Mafra.

On 15 September 2023, Vitor Gabriel signed for Liga 3 club Académica de Coimbra.
