= Paulo César Carpegiani =

Brazilian footballer and manager

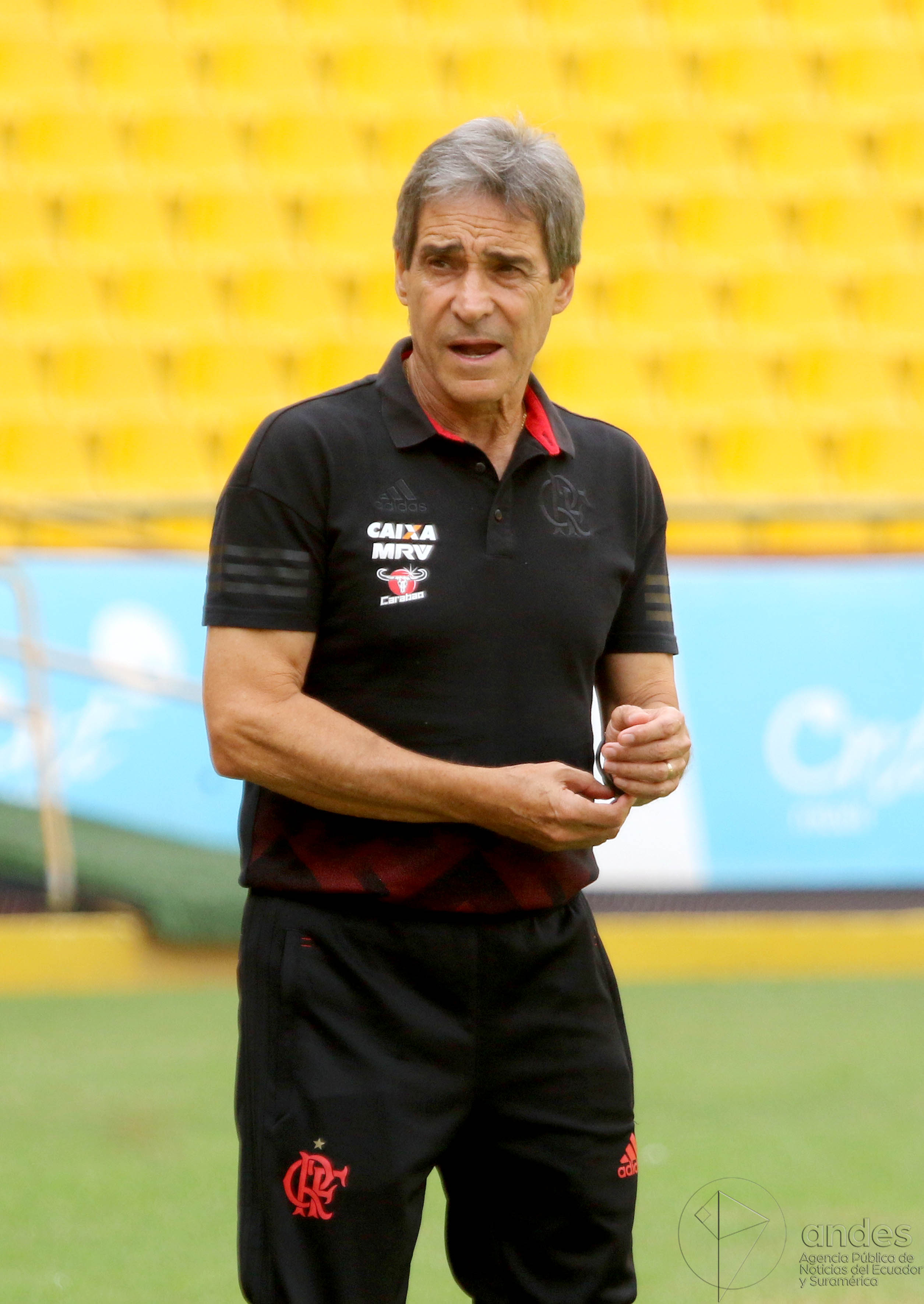

Personal information
- Full name: Paulo César Carpegiani
- Date of birth: 7 February 1949 (age 77)
- Place of birth: Erechim, Brazil
- Height: 1.75 m (5 ft 9 in)
- Position: Central midfielder

Youth career
- 1964–1969: Internacional

Senior career*
| Years | Team | Apps | (Gls) |
| 1970–1977 | Internacional | 77 | (31) |
| 1977–1980 | Flamengo | 55 | (29) |
| Total | | 132 | (60) |

International career
| 1974–1979 | Brazil | 16 | (0) |

Managerial career
- 1981–1983: Flamengo
- 1983–1984: Al Nassr
- 1985: Internacional
- 1986: Nautico
- 1986–1987: Bangu
- 1989: Internacional
- 1989: Nautico
- 1991: Cerro Porteño
- 1991–1992: Palmeiras
- 1992: Barcelona Guayaquil
- 1992–1994: Cerro Porteño
- 1995: Coritiba
- 1996–1998: Paraguay
- 1999: São Paulo
- 2000: Flamengo
- 2001: Atlético Paranaense
- 2001: Cruzeiro
- 2003–2004: Kuwait
- 2007: Corinthians
- 2009: Vitória
- 2010: Atlético Paranaense
- 2010–2011: São Paulo
- 2012: Vitória
- 2013: Ponte Preta
- 2016–2017: Coritiba
- 2017: Bahia
- 2018: Flamengo
- 2018: Vitória
- * Club domestic league appearances and goals

Paulo César Carpegiani (born 7 February 1949, in Erechim) is a Brazilian retired footballer who played as a midfielder.

== Playing career ==
Carpegiani began his professional career at Sport Club Internacional of Porto Alegre, in Rio Grande do Sul, where he played from 1970 to 1977, winning two Brazilian Championships (1975 and 1976). Carpegiani also played for Flamengo (1977–1980), winning the Brazilian Championship in 1980.

== Coaching career ==
Upon retiring, he started a career as a football coach. To begin with Carpegiani coached Flamengo and won the Copa Libertadores de América (Libertadores Cup) and the Intercontinental Cup, beating Liverpool, in 1981. He also won a Brazilian Championship in 1982. In 1992, he was coach of the Barcelona Sporting Club (Guayaquil - Ecuador). In 2007, he was hired by the Corinthians. The team lost in his first match, against Clube Náutico Capibaribe, and the club was eliminated from the Copa do Brasil in the quarter finals. His first match of the Campeonato Brasileiro was against Esporte Clube Juventude and Corinthians won.

His best performance as a coach was with the Paraguay national team from 1996 to 1998 (including a good run in the World Cup, losing to France in extra time). On April 10, 2009 Carpegiani was hired as Vitória's head coach. On June 1, 2010 Atlético Paranaense officials hired the former Vitória coach to replace Leandro Niehues.

== Career statistics ==
=== Head coach ===
| Nat | Team | From | To | Record | | | | |
| Nat | Team | From | To | P | W | D | L | Win % |
|---|---|---|---|---|---|---|---|---|
| (Brazil) | CR Flamengo | 1981 | 1983 | 116 | 71 | 27 | 18 | 61.21 |
| (Saudi Arabia) | Al Nassr | 1983 | 1984 | 21 | 9 | 6 | 6 | 42.86 |
| (Brazil) | Internacional | 1985 | 1985 | 52 | 28 | 14 | 10 | 53.85 |
| (Brazil) | Náutico | 1986 | 1986 | 26 | 10 | 5 | 11 | 38.46 |
| (Brazil) | Bangu | 1986 | 1987 | 73 | 30 | 24 | 19 | 41.10 |
| (Brazil) | Internacional | 1989 | 1989 | 38 | 20 | 8 | 10 | 52.63 |
| (Brazil) | Náutico | 1989 | 1989 | 28 | 9 | 7 | 12 | 32.14 |
| (Paraguay) | Cerro Porteño | 1991 | 1991 | 21 | 7 | 10 | 4 | 33.33 |
| (Brazil) | Palmeiras | 1991 | 1992 | 12 | 3 | 6 | 3 | 25.00 |
| (Ecuador) | Barcelona | 1992 | 1992 | 34 | 18 | 8 | 8 | 52.94 |
| (Paraguay) | Cerro Porteño | 1992 | 1994 | 102 | 52 | 34 | 16 | 50.98 |
| (Brazil) | Coritiba | 1995 | 1995 | 64 | 35 | 17 | 12 | 54.69 |
| (Paraguay) | Paraguay | 1996 | 1998 | 36 | 14 | 11 | 11 | 38.89 |
| (Brazil) | São Paulo | 1999 | 1999 | 67 | 40 | 9 | 18 | 59.70 |
| (Brazil) | CR Flamengo | 2000 | 2000 | 22 | 12 | 4 | 6 | 54.55 |
| (Brazil) | Atlético Paranaense | 2001 | 2001 | 25 | 16 | 4 | 5 | 64.00 |
| (Brazil) | Cruzeiro | 2001 | 2001 | 10 | 3 | 3 | 4 | 30.00 |
| (Kuwait) | Kuwait | 2003 | 2004 | 19 | 9 | 5 | 5 | 47.37 |
| (Brazil) | Corinthians | 2007 | 2007 | 23 | 6 | 9 | 8 | 26.09 |
| (Brazil) | Vitória | 2009 | 2009 | 26 | 11 | 6 | 9 | 42.31 |
| (Brazil) | Atlético Paranaense | 2010 | 2010 | 21 | 11 | 5 | 5 | 52.38 |
| (Brazil) | São Paulo | 2010 | 2011 | 47 | 30 | 4 | 13 | 63.83 |
| (Brazil) | Vitória | 2012 | 2012 | 32 | 19 | 7 | 6 | 59.38 |
| (Brazil) | Ponte Preta | 2013 | 2013 | 13 | 4 | 3 | 6 | 30.77 |
| (Brazil) | Coritiba | 2016 | 2017 | 32 | 11 | 10 | 11 | 34.38 |
| (Brazil) | Bahia | 2017 | 2017 | 12 | 5 | 4 | 3 | 41.67 |
| (Brazil) | CR Flamengo | 2018 | 2018 | 17 | 11 | 3 | 3 | 64.71 |
| (Brazil) | Vitória | 2018 | 2018 | 14 | 4 | 3 | 7 | 28.57 |
| Total | | | | 1,040 | 517 | 260 | 263 | 49.71 |

As of November 19, 2012

== Honors ==
=== Player ===
Internacional

- Campeonato Brasileiro Série A: 1975, 1976
- Campeonato Gaúcho: 1969, 1970, 1971, 1972, 1973, 1974, 1975, 1976

Flamengo

- Campeonato Brasileiro Série A: 1980
- Campeonato Carioca: 1978, 1979

=== Coach ===
Flamengo

- Copa Libertadores: 1981
- Intercontinental Cup: 1981
- Campeonato Carioca: 1981
- Campeonato Brasileiro Série A: 1982

Náutico

- Campeonato Brasileiro Série B: 1986

Cerro Porteño

- Paraguayan First Division: 1992, 1994

Atlético Paranaense

- Campeonato Paranaense: 2001

Vitória

- Campeonato Baiano: 2009

=== Individual ===
- Silver Ball Revista Placar- Internacional
- 3rd Paraguay best manager all time- 1998 FIFA World Cup
