= 2022 AFC Futsal Asian Cup squads =

List of the national futsal squads that take part in the 2022 AFC Futsal Asian Cup

The following is a list of squads for each national team competing at the 2022 AFC Futsal Asian Cup. The tournament was held in Kuwait from 27 September to 8 October 2022. The 16 national teams involved in the tournament were required by the AFC to register a squad of 14 players, including two goalkeepers.

The age listed for each player is as of 27 September 2022, the first day of the tournament.

== Group A ==
=== Kuwait ===
The final squad was announced on 26 September.

Head coach: (Brazil) Cacau

No.	Pos.	Player	Date of birth (age)	Club
1	GK	Mohammad Al-Huzaim		(Kuwait Football Association) Kazma
2	GK	Khaled Abdullah		(Kuwait Football Association) Al-Arabi
3	FP	Yousef Al-Khalifah		(Kuwait Football Association) Al-Qadsia
4	FP	Ahmed Al-Farsi	30 October 1989 (aged 32)	(Kuwait Football Association) Al-Kuwait
5	FP	Hamad Hayat (captain)	24 December 1986 (aged 35)	(Kuwait Football Association) Al-Yarmouk
6	FP	Abdulrahman Al-Wadi	9 October 1986 (aged 35)	(Kuwait Football Association) Al-Qadsia
7	FP	Abdulrahman Al-Tawail	3 February 1991 (aged 31)	(Kuwait Football Association) Al-Kuwait
8	FP	Najeeb Ali		
9	FP	Abdulrahman Al-Mosabehi	13 June 1989 (aged 33)	(Kuwait Football Association) Al-Arabi
10	FP	Abdullatif Al-Abbasi		(Kuwait Football Association) Al-Kuwait
11	FP	Abdulaziz Al-Basam		
12	FP	Hamad Al-Awadhi	9 February 1989 (aged 33)	(Kuwait Football Association) Al-Yarmouk
13	FP	Ali Al-Saif		(Kuwait Football Association) Al-Kuwait
14	FP	Saleh Al-Fadhel		(Kuwait Football Association) Kazma

=== Iraq ===
Head coach: (Iran) Mohammad Nazemasharieh

No.	Pos.	Player	Date of birth (age)	Club
1	GK	Mohammed Sami		(Iraq Football Association) Al-Shorta
2	GK	Ahmed Duraid		(Iraq Football Association) Al-Shorta
3	FP	Ali Shihab		(Iraq Football Association) Al-Shorta
4	FP	Fahad Methaq		
5	FP	Mustafa Ihsan		
6	FP	Mohanad Abdulhadi		
7	FP	Salim Faisal	16 January 1995 (aged 27)	
8	FP	Ghaith Riyadh		
9	FP	Muheb Al-Deen		(Iraq Football Association) Al-Shorta
10	FP	Rafid Hameed	9 January 1993 (aged 29)	
11	FP	Haedr Majed		(Iraq Football Association) Naft Al-Wasat
12	GK	Zaher Mahdi		(Iraq Football Association) Al-Jinsiya
13	FP	Tareq Zeyad		
14	FP	Waleed Khalid (captain)	29 June 1992 (aged 30)	(Iraq Football Association) Naft Al-Wasat

=== Thailand ===
The final squad was announced on 23 September.

Head coach: (Spain) Carlos Núñez Gago

No.	Pos.	Player	Date of birth (age)	Club
1	GK	Panurat Olan	9 February 1999 (aged 23)	(Football Association of Thailand) Thammasat Stallion
2	MF	Panat Kittipanuwong	14 May 1998 (aged 24)	(Football Association of Thailand) Chonburi Bluewave
3	MF	Worasak Srirangpirot	26 December 1992 (aged 29)	(Football Association of Thailand) Chonburi Bluewave
4	DF	Krit Aransanyalak	27 March 2001 (aged 21)	(Football Association of Thailand) Chonburi Bluewave
5	DF	Ronnachai Jungwongsuk	4 March 1997 (aged 25)	(Football Association of Thailand) Chonburi Bluewave
6	DF	Itticha Praphaphan		(Football Association of Thailand) Port
7	MF	Charoondej Muenthiang		(Football Association of Thailand) Black Pearl United
8	FW	Jetsada Chudech	20 February 1989 (aged 33)	(Football Association of Thailand) Port
9	FW	Suphawut Thueanklang (captain)	14 July 1989 (aged 33)	(Football Association of Thailand) Chonburi Bluewave
10	FW	Warut Wangsama-aeo	12 December 1992 (aged 29)	(Football Association of Thailand) Chonburi Bluewave
11	MF	Tanatip Sangsung	14 April 1994 (aged 28)	(Football Association of Thailand) Black Pearl United
12	GK	Katawut Hankampa	27 May 1992 (aged 30)	(Football Association of Thailand) Bangkok BTS
13	DF	Sarawut Phalaphruek	9 June 1997 (aged 25)	(Football Association of Thailand) Chonburi Bluewave
14	DF	Narongsak Wingwon	18 February 1998 (aged 24)	(Football Association of Thailand) Hongyen Thakam

=== Oman ===
The final squad was announced on 26 September.

Head coach: Younis Al-Fahdi

No.	Pos.	Player	Date of birth (age)	Club
1	GK	Hisham Al-Wahaibi		(Oman Football Association) Salalah
2	FP	Mohammed Taqi	12 September 1985 (aged 37)	
3	FP	Muhannad Al-Shibli		
4	FP	Mansoor Al-Hadi		(Oman Football Association) Salalah
5	FP	Ali Thani		
6	FP	Issa Al-Balushi		
7	FP	Muatasim Al-Shamsi		(Oman Football Association) Salalah
8	FP	Zamel Al-Balushi		(Oman Football Association) Salalah
9	FP	Khalfan Al-Maawali		(Oman Football Association) Salalah
10	FP	Samer Al-Balushi (captain)		(Oman Football Association) Salalah
11	FP	Loay Al-Wahaibi		
12	GK	Abdulaziz Al-Ruqadi	22 May 1990 (aged 32)	
13	FP	Ahmed Al-Khatri		(Oman Football Association) Al-Shabab
14	FP	Mu'ataz Thani		

== Group B ==
=== Uzbekistan ===
The final squad was announced on 22 September.

Head coach: Bakhodir Akhmedov

No.	Pos.	Player	Date of birth (age)	Club
1	GK	Rustam Umarov (captain)	26 May 1984 (aged 38)	(Uzbekistan Football Association) Jizzakh Khuasin
2	FP	Anaskhon Rakhmatov	20 June 1994 (aged 28)	(Uzbekistan Football Association) Jizzakh Khuasin
3	FP	Mashrab Adilov	8 August 1994 (aged 28)	(Uzbekistan Football Association) BMB
4	FP	Ikhtiyor Ropiev	19 September 1993 (aged 29)	(Uzbekistan Football Association) Jizzakh Khuasin
5	FP	Sunatulla Juraev	24 December 1994 (aged 27)	(Uzbekistan Football Association) Jizzakh Khuasin
6	FP	Ilkhomjon Khamroev	25 September 1997 (aged 25)	(Uzbekistan Football Association) Jizzakh Khuasin
7	FP	Dilshod Rakhmatov	4 December 1989 (aged 32)	(Uzbekistan Football Association) Jizzakh Khuasin
8	FP	Khusniddin Nishonov	19 May 1998 (aged 24)	(Uzbekistan Football Association) BMB
9	FP	Elbek Tulkinov	24 December 2000 (aged 21)	(Uzbekistan Football Association) Jizzakh Khuasin
10	FP	Davron Choriev	1 January 1993 (aged 29)	(Uzbekistan Football Association) BMB
11	FP	Akbar Usmonov	9 March 1997 (aged 25)	(Uzbekistan Football Association) BMB
12	GK	Ravshan Elibaev	26 January 1987 (aged 35)	(Uzbekistan Football Association) BMB
13	FP	Shakhram Fakhriddinov		(Uzbekistan Football Association) Jizzakh Khuasin
14	FP	Davlat Ibragimov		(Uzbekistan Football Association) Almalyk

=== Bahrain ===
The final squad was announced on 26 September.

Head coach: (Brazil) Lino Gomes

No.	Pos.	Player	Date of birth (age)	Club
1	GK	Yusuf Abdulla	17 August 1987 (aged 35)	
2	FP	Saleh Ahmed	10 November 1999 (aged 22)	(Bahrain Football Association) Mohammed Jalal and Sons
3	FP	Ahmed Antar	25 July 1991 (aged 31)	(Bahrain Football Association) Mohammed Jalal and Sons
4	FP	Falah Abbas	22 January 1991 (aged 31)	(Bahrain Football Association) Al-Saar
5	FP	Hasan Marzooq	6 March 1992 (aged 30)	(Bahrain Football Association) Al-Hidd
6	FP	Ammar Hasan Mayhad	2 October 1993 (aged 28)	(Bahrain Football Association) Al-Hidd
7	FP	Ali Al-Alwani	5 July 1993 (aged 29)	
8	FP	Mohamed Al-Sandi (captain)	26 September 1988 (aged 34)	(Bahrain Football Association) Al-Saar
9	FP	Mohamed Abdulla	28 November 1990 (aged 31)	
10	FP	Jassam Saleh	21 August 1989 (aged 33)	
11	FP	Hamed Abdulla	21 July 1997 (aged 25)	
12	FP	Salman Maula	4 April 1993 (aged 29)	(Bahrain Football Association) Al-Hidd
13	GK	Sayed Fadhel	31 July 1987 (aged 35)	(Bahrain Football Association) Al-Saar
14	GK	Sayed Mohamed	7 May 1986 (aged 36)	

=== Tajikistan ===
The final squad was announced on 20 September.

Head coach: Pairav Vakhidov

No.	Pos.	Player	Date of birth (age)	Club
1	GK	Firuz Bozmamadov		(Tajikistan Football Federation) Istiklol
2	GK	Firuz Bekmurodov	10 January 1998 (aged 24)	(Tajikistan Football Federation) Istiklol
3	FP	Bahodur Khojaev		(Tajikistan Football Federation) Istaravshan
4	FP	Shavqat Halimov	15 November 1997 (aged 24)	(Tajikistan Football Federation) Sipar
5	FP	Sobirdzhon Gulyakov	8 February 1998 (aged 24)	(Tajikistan Football Federation) Sipar
6	FP	Idris Yorov		(Tajikistan Football Federation) Soro Company
7	FP	Rustam Hamidov		(Tajikistan Football Federation) Istiklol
8	FP	Muhamadjon Sharipov	12 September 1997 (aged 25)	(Tajikistan Football Federation) Soro Company
9	FP	Fayzali Sardorov	8 April 1998 (aged 24)	(Tajikistan Football Federation) Soro Company
10	FP	Nekruz Alimakhmadov	10 August 1995 (aged 27)	(Tajikistan Football Federation) Soro Company
11	FP	Iqboli Vositzoda	8 May 1998 (aged 24)	(Tajikistan Football Federation) Sipar
12	FP	Umed Kuziev	17 December 1997 (aged 24)	(Tajikistan Football Federation) Sipar
13	FP	Bakhtiyor Soliev	16 December 2001 (aged 20)	(Tajikistan Football Federation) Soro Company
14	FP	Dilshod Salomov (captain)	5 October 1995 (aged 26)	(Tajikistan Football Federation) Soro Company

=== Turkmenistan ===
Head coach: Guwanç Kanaýew

No.	Pos.	Player	Date of birth (age)	Club
1	GK	Berdimyrat Sapardurdyýew	19 August 1993 (aged 29)	(Football Federation of Turkmenistan) Köpetdag
2	FP	Röwşen Orazmuhammedow	19 September 1992 (aged 30)	(Football Federation of Turkmenistan) Gümrükçi
3	FP	Gylyçmyrat Gylyçmyradow	6 August 1992 (aged 30)	(Football Federation of Turkmenistan) Deňizçi
4	FP	Maksat Soltanow	29 January 1993 (aged 29)	(Football Federation of Turkmenistan) Deňizçi
5	FP	Kerwen Annaorazow		(Football Federation of Turkmenistan) Köpetdag
6	FP	Danil Pançenko		(Football Federation of Turkmenistan) Deňizçi
7	FP	Gurbangeldi Sähedow	18 May 1994 (aged 28)	(Football Federation of Turkmenistan) Köpetdag
8	FP	Şiri Baýramdurdyýew	16 November 1990 (aged 31)	(Football Federation of Turkmenistan) Deňizçi
9	FP	Allamyrat Gurbanow	31 August 1995 (aged 27)	(Football Federation of Turkmenistan) Deňizçi
10	FP	Mülkaman Annagulyýew	16 October 1993 (aged 28)	(Football Federation of Turkmenistan) Köpetdag
11	FP	Watan Ataýew	11 November 1991 (aged 30)	(Football Federation of Turkmenistan) Köpetdag
12	GK	Meretgeldi Baýramow (captain)	8 January 1996 (aged 26)	(Football Federation of Turkmenistan) Deňizçi
13	FP	Kadyr Berenow	26 October 1994 (aged 27)	(Football Federation of Turkmenistan) Deňizçi
14	FP	Maksat Myradow		(Football Federation of Turkmenistan) Köpetdag

== Group C ==
=== Iran ===
The final squad was announced on 27 September.

Head coach: Vahid Shamsaei

No.	Pos.	Player	Date of birth (age)	Club
1	GK	Sina Parkas	17 August 1992 (aged 30)	(Football Federation Islamic Republic of Iran) Sunich Saveh
2	GK	Saeid Momeni	23 November 1992 (aged 29)	(Football Federation Islamic Republic of Iran) Crop Alvand
3	FP	Mahdi Asadshir		(Football Federation Islamic Republic of Iran) Sunich Saveh
4	FP	Alireza Rafieipour	9 October 1993 (aged 28)	(Football Federation Islamic Republic of Iran) Crop Alvand
5	FP	Hossein Derakhshani	1 April 1993 (aged 29)	(Football Federation Islamic Republic of Iran) Giti Pasand
6	FP	Bahman Jafari		(Football Federation Islamic Republic of Iran) Farsh Ara
7	FP	Mahdi Karimi	28 January 1997 (aged 25)	(Football Federation Islamic Republic of Iran) Giti Pasand
8	FP	Moslem Oladghobad	29 November 1995 (aged 26)	(Royal Spanish Football Federation) AE Palma
9	FP	Saeid Ahmadabbasi	31 July 1992 (aged 30)	(Royal Spanish Football Federation) Valdepeñas
10	FP	Hossein Tayyebi (captain)	29 September 1988 (aged 33)	(Royal Spanish Football Federation) AE Palma
11	FP	Alireza Javan	2 February 1995 (aged 27)	(Football Federation Islamic Republic of Iran) Crop Alvand
12	FP	Salar Aghapour	7 March 2000 (aged 22)	(Football Federation Islamic Republic of Iran) Mes Sungun
13	FP	Mohammad Hossein Bazyar	29 November 2003 (aged 18)	(Football Federation Islamic Republic of Iran) Sanaye Poshtiban
14	FP	Hamzeh Kadkhodaei	2 February 1997 (aged 25)	(Football Federation Islamic Republic of Iran) Mes Sungun

=== Lebanon ===
The final squad was announced on 24 September.

Head coach: (Portugal) João Almeida

No.	Pos.	Player	Date of birth (age)	Club
1	GK	Hussein Hamadani	23 June 1984 (aged 38)	(Lebanese Football Association) Horiya Saida
2	GK	Karim Joueidi		(Lebanese Football Association) Horiya Saida
3	FP	Ali Daher	1 May 1994 (aged 28)	(Lebanese Football Association) Houmin Fawqa
4	FP	Hussein Hamieh		(Lebanese Football Association) Choueifat
5	FP	Steve Koukezian	18 May 1999 (aged 23)	(French Football Federation) Elsass Pfastatt
6	FP	Issa Mehrez		(Lebanese Football Association) FC Jounieh
7	FP	Hassan Zeitoun	15 February 1988 (aged 34)	(Lebanese Football Association) Horiya Saida
8	FP	Kassem Kawsan	1 October 1985 (aged 36)	
9	FP	Mustafa Rhyem	1 October 1993 (aged 28)	(Lebanese Football Association) Houmin Fawqa
10	FP	Hassan Alame		
12	FP	Mouhammad Hammoud	7 June 1997 (aged 25)	(Lebanese Football Association) Horiya Saida
13	FP	Ali Hachem		(Lebanese Football Association) Horiya Saida
14	FP	Fadi Greij		(Lebanese Football Association) FC Jounieh

=== Chinese Taipei ===
The final squad was announced on 22 September 2022.

Head coach: (Portugal) José Adil Amarante

No.	Pos.	Player	Date of birth (age)	Club
1	GK	Chiang Hsin-wei	9 December 1996 (aged 25)	(Chinese Taipei Football Association) YTFC Taipei
2	GK	Chen Wei-chun	18 February 2000 (aged 22)	(Chinese Taipei Football Association) Chiayi Tienching
3	FP	Liu Ju-ming		(Chinese Taipei Football Association) Taichung Traveler
4	FP	Hsieh Chin-cheng		(Chinese Taipei Football Association) Chiayi Tienching
5	FP	Wang Kun-wei	7 April 2000 (aged 22)	(Chinese Taipei Football Association) Chiayi Tienching
6	FP	Chen Ching-hsuan		(Chinese Taipei Football Association) Chiayi Tienching
7	FP	Tang Wei-tai	8 August 1995 (aged 27)	(Chinese Taipei Football Association) YTFC Taipei
8	FP	Huang Wei-lun		(Chinese Taipei Football Association) Chiayi Tienching
9	FP	Lin Chih-hung	26 July 1997 (aged 25)	(Chinese Taipei Football Association) Chiayi Tienching
10	FP	Chi Sheng-fa (captain)	21 August 1993 (aged 29)	(Chinese Football Association) Ningbo Yonghu
11	FP	He Chia-chen	31 August 1996 (aged 26)	(Chinese Taipei Football Association) Chiayi Tienching
12	GK	Fu Li-wei	9 June 1993 (aged 29)	(Chinese Taipei Football Association) Taichung Traveler
13	FP	Lin Pang-ko		(Chinese Taipei Football Association) CTFA U20
14	FP	Tai Wei-jen	1 April 2000 (aged 22)	(Chinese Taipei Football Association) YTFC Taipei

=== Indonesia ===
The final squad was announced on 19 September.

Head coach: (Iran) Mohammad Hashemzadeh

No.	Pos.	Player	Date of birth (age)	Club
1	GK	Nazil Purnama	23 March 1992 (aged 30)	(Football Association of Indonesia) Bintang Timur Surabaya
2	GK	Nizar Nayaruddin	17 February 1995 (aged 27)	(Football Association of Indonesia) Kancil BBK
3	DF	Rizki Xavier	15 January 1999 (aged 23)	(Football Association of Indonesia) Cosmo JNE
4	DF	Iqbal Rahmatullah (captain)	23 August 1995 (aged 27)	(Football Association of Indonesia) Bintang Timur Surabaya
5	DF	Dewa Rizki	16 January 2001 (aged 21)	(Football Association of Indonesia) Cosmo JNE
6	MF	Wendy Brian	14 October 1999 (aged 22)	(Football Association of Indonesia) Black Steel Manokwari
7	MF	Syauqi Saud	29 January 1997 (aged 25)	(Football Association of Indonesia) Bintang Timur Surabaya
8	MF	Ardiansyah Nur	27 August 1997 (aged 25)	(Football Association of Indonesia) Black Steel Manokwari
9	FW	Rio Pangestu	30 August 1997 (aged 25)	(Football Association of Indonesia) Bintang Timur Surabaya
10	FW	Muhammad Fajriyan	23 August 1997 (aged 25)	(Football Association of Indonesia) DB Asia
11	MF	Firman Adriansyah	9 February 2000 (aged 22)	(Football Association of Indonesia) Cosmo JNE
12	FW	Samuel Eko	16 May 1998 (aged 24)	(Football Association of Indonesia) Bintang Timur Surabaya
13	MF	Reza Gunawan	25 October 1998 (aged 23)	(Football Association of Indonesia) Cosmo JNE
14	MF	Ryan Reynaldi	18 May 1998 (aged 24)	(Football Association of Indonesia) Halus FC

== Group D ==
=== Japan ===
The final squad was announced on 18 September 2022.

Head coach: Kenichiro Kogure

No.	Pos.	Player	Date of birth (age)	Club
1	GK	Higor Pires	7 July 1980 (aged 42)	(Japan Football Association) Bardral Urayasu
2	GK	Guilherme Kuromoto	16 May 1986 (aged 36)	(Japan Football Association) Tachikawa Athletic
3	MF	Soma Mizutani	24 July 1996 (aged 26)	(Japan Football Association) Nagoya Oceans
4	DF	Kentaro Ishida	1 January 1998 (aged 24)	(Japan Football Association) Bardral Urayasu
5	DF	Arthur Oliveira (captain)	30 July 1990 (aged 32)	(Japan Football Association) Nagoya Oceans
6	MF	Tomoki Yoshikawa	3 February 1989 (aged 33)	(Japan Football Association) Nagoya Oceans
7	MF	Sora Kanazawa	26 December 2001 (aged 20)	(Japan Football Association) Tachikawa Athletic
8	DF	Atsuya Uemura	21 November 1996 (aged 25)	(Japan Football Association) Tachikawa Athletic
9	FW	António Hirata	16 November 1995 (aged 26)	(Japan Football Association) Nagoya Oceans
10	MF	Vinícius Crepaldi	11 February 1987 (aged 35)	(Japan Football Association) Pescadola Machida
11	FW	Kazuya Shimizu	6 February 1997 (aged 25)	(Japan Football Association) Fugador Sumida
12	MF	Kokoro Harada	1 July 2004 (aged 18)	(Royal Spanish Football Federation) Barça Atlètic
13	MF	Takumi Nagasaka	8 November 1994 (aged 27)	(Japan Football Association) Bardral Urayasu
14	DF	Shunta Uchimura	1 August 1991 (aged 31)	(Japan Football Association) Shonan Bellmare

=== Vietnam ===
The final squad was announced on 24 September.

Head coach: (Argentina) Diego Giustozzi

No.	Pos.	Player	Date of birth (age)	Club
1	GK	Hồ Văn Ý	1 January 1997 (aged 25)	(Vietnam Football Federation) Thái Sơn Nam
2	GK	Mai Xuân Hiệp	1 July 1992 (aged 30)	(Vietnam Football Federation) Sahako
3	MF	Lê Quốc Nam	14 November 1993 (aged 28)	(Vietnam Football Federation) Thái Sơn Nam
4	MF	Châu Đoàn Phát	14 March 1999 (aged 23)	(Vietnam Football Federation) Thái Sơn Nam
5	DF	Nguyễn Mạnh Dũng	9 June 1997 (aged 25)	(Vietnam Football Federation) Thái Sơn Nam
6	DF	Phạm Đức Hòa	12 April 1991 (aged 31)	(Vietnam Football Federation) Thái Sơn Nam
7	MF	Nguyễn Anh Duy	12 December 1992 (aged 29)	(Vietnam Football Federation) Thái Sơn Nam
8	FW	Nguyễn Minh Trí	8 April 1996 (aged 26)	(Vietnam Football Federation) Thái Sơn Nam
9	MF	Trần Thái Huy	12 October 1995 (aged 26)	(Vietnam Football Federation) Thái Sơn Nam
10	FW	Nguyễn Thịnh Phát	10 June 1997 (aged 25)	(Vietnam Football Federation) Thái Sơn Nam
11	DF	Trần Văn Vũ (captain)	30 May 1990 (aged 32)	(Vietnam Football Federation) Thái Sơn Nam
12	FW	Nguyễn Đắc Huy	10 May 1991 (aged 31)	(Vietnam Football Federation) Sahako
13	DF	Nhan Gia Hưng	13 July 2002 (aged 20)	(Vietnam Football Federation) Thái Sơn Nam
14	MF	Chu Văn Tiến	19 September 1996 (aged 26)	(Vietnam Football Federation) Sahako

=== South Korea ===
Head coach: Lee Sang-jin

No.	Pos.	Player	Date of birth (age)	Club
1	GK	Seo Jung-woo	20 June 1990 (aged 32)	(Korea Football Association) Gyeonggi LBFS
2	GK	Lee Woo-jin	8 September 1990 (aged 32)	(Korea Football Association) Daegu Bukgu Dalseo
3	FP	Lee Han-wool	3 September 1992 (aged 30)	(Korea Football Association) Hongcheon Oryong
4	FP	Kim Yun-young	6 November 2000 (aged 21)	(Korea Football Association) Nowon FS
5	FP	Yoo Seung-mu	23 September 1989 (aged 33)	(Korea Football Association) Goyang Bulls
6	FP	Shin Ha-il	12 October 1995 (aged 26)	(Korea Football Association) Nowongu Daybreak
7	FP	Kim Min-kuk	17 February 1987 (aged 35)	(Korea Football Association) Seoul Songpa Guma
8	FP	Lee Ahn	23 September 1993 (aged 29)	(Korea Football Association) Daegu Bukgu Dalseo
9	FP	Park Jeong-jin	12 October 1994 (aged 27)	(Korea Football Association) Kanghwa Hanul
10	FP	Shin Jong-hoon	23 January 1990 (aged 32)	(Korea Football Association) Jeonju MAG
11	FP	Chun Jin-woo (captain)	21 November 1987 (aged 34)	(Korea Football Association) Chilgokgun Sungsan
12	FP	Kang Ju-kwang	17 August 1994 (aged 28)	(Korea Football Association) Dongducheon One Team
13	FP	Yoo Kyung-dong	11 December 1997 (aged 24)	(Korea Football Association) Gyeonggi LBFS
14	FP	Moon Hee-jae	17 May 1995 (aged 27)	(Korea Football Association) Fantasia Bucheon

=== Saudi Arabia ===
The final squad was announced on 22 September.

Head coach: (Spain) Andreu Plaza

No.	Pos.	Player	Date of birth (age)	Club
1	GK	Asaad Al-Saad	1 April 1983 (aged 39)	(Saudi Arabian Football Federation) Al Qadsiah
2	FP	Mohamed Al-Khammas		(Saudi Arabian Football Federation) Ettifaq
3	FP	Nasser Al-Harthi		(Saudi Arabian Football Federation) Ettifaq
4	GK	Humood Al-Dahhan		(Saudi Arabian Football Federation) Al-Thoqbah
5	FP	Abdulilah Al-Otaibi		(Saudi Arabian Football Federation) Al Qadsiah
6	FP	Abdullah Al-Maghrabi		
7	FP	Meshari Al-Obid		(Saudi Arabian Football Federation) Ettifaq
8	FP	Mansour Al-Zahrani		
9	FP	Saleh Al-Qarni		(Saudi Arabian Football Federation) Al Qadsiah
10	FP	Abdulaziz Al-Alwni (captain)	17 March 1989 (aged 33)	(Saudi Arabian Football Federation) Ettifaq
11	FP	Osama Baabdullah		(Saudi Arabian Football Federation) Ettifaq
12	FP	Fahad Rudayni		(Saudi Arabian Football Federation) Al-Raed
13	FP	Mohsen Fqihe		(Saudi Arabian Football Federation) Al-Raed
14	FP	Farhan Ali		(Saudi Arabian Football Federation) Al Qadsiah
