= 2024 AFC Futsal Asian Cup squads =

List of the national futsal squads that take part in the 2024 AFC Futsal Asian Cup

The following is a list of squads for each national team competing at the 2024 AFC Futsal Asian Cup. The tournament was held in Kuwait from 17 to 28 April 2024. The 16 national teams involved in the tournament were required by the AFC to register a squad of 14 players, including two goalkeepers.

== Group A ==
=== China ===
The final squad was announced on 7 April 2024.

Head coach: (China) Li Jiuquan

No.	Pos.	Player	Date of birth (age)	Club
1	GK	Zhu Bei (朱蓓)	12 February 1991 (aged 33)	(Chinese Football Association) Nanling Tielang
2	GK	Song Zechao (宋泽超)		(Chinese Football Association) Hangzhou Qiantang
3	FP	Wang Jialin (王佳林)		(Chinese Football Association) Shanghai Jiading
4	FP	Wang Bo (王博)		(Chinese Football Association) Nanling Tielang
5	FP	Kaisai'er Taximaimaiti (凯赛尔·塔西买买提)		(Chinese Football Association) Nanling Tielang
6	FP	Xu Yang (徐洋)	14 February 1993 (aged 31)	(Chinese Football Association) Hangzhou Qiantang
7	FP	Zhuang Jianfa (庄健发)	23 July 1991 (aged 32)	(Chinese Football Association) Shenzhen Nanling
8	FP	Chen Zhiheng (陈智恒)		(Chinese Football Association) Nanling Tielang
9	FP	Xiong Xiaoyi (熊霄毅)		(Chinese Football Association) Hangzhou Qiantang
10	FP	Yakepujiang Maimaiti (亚克普江·麦麦提)		(Chinese Football Association) Nanling Tielang
11	FP	Shen Siming (沈思明)	26 July 1995 (aged 28)	(Chinese Football Association) Hangzhou Qiantang
12	FP	Paihei'er Tudahong (排黑尔·吐达洪)		(Chinese Football Association) Shijiazhuang Fumei
13	FP	Geng Deyang (耿德旸)		(Chinese Football Association) Cixi Guanhaiwei University of Technology
14	FP	Xie Zhuozhuang (谢茁壮)		(Chinese Football Association) Hangzhou Qiantang

=== Myanmar ===
The final squad was announced on 12 April 2024.

Head coach: (Thailand) Bunlert Charoenwong

No.	Pos.	Player	Date of birth (age)	Club
1	GK	May Soe Myat Htwe	2003	(Myanmar Football Federation) MIU FC
2	GK	Nyi Nyi Thant	1997	(Myanmar Football Federation) MIU FC
3	MF	Ko Ko Lwin	4 November 1996 (aged 27)	(Myanmar Football Federation) MIU FC
4	DF	Myo Thet Aung	1 December 1988 (aged 35)	(Myanmar Football Federation) MIU FC
5	DF	Wai Zin Oo	1992	(Myanmar Football Federation) VUC FC
6	MF	Tun Min Hlaing	2002	(Myanmar Football Federation) VUC FC
7	MF	Nyein Min Soe	19 May 1996 (aged 27)	(Myanmar Football Federation) VUC FC
8	MF	Myo Myint Soe	16 May 1991 (aged 32)	(Myanmar Football Federation) VUC FC
9	FW	Myo Thet Kyaw	2002	(Myanmar Football Federation) VUC FC
10	FW	Hlaing Min Tun	1993	(Myanmar Football Federation) MIU FC
11	MF	Htut Wai Tun	2001	(Myanmar Football Federation) VUC FC
12	DF	Min Chit Thu	2002	(Myanmar Football Federation) M2K FC
13	FW	Aung Zin Oo	19 December 1993 (aged 30)	(Myanmar Football Federation) VUC FC
14	MF	Naing Lin Tun Kyaw	1993	(Myanmar Football Federation) VUC FC

=== Thailand ===
The final squad was announced on 12 April 2024.

Head coach: (Spain) Miguel Rodrigo

No.	Pos.	Player	Date of birth (age)	Club
1	GK	Arut Senbat	26 November 1988 (aged 35)	(Football Association of Thailand) Black Pearl United
2	DF	Narongsak Wingwon	18 February 1998 (aged 26)	(Football Association of Thailand) Hongyen Thakam
3	MF	Alongkorn Janphon	16 September 1994 (aged 29)	(Football Association of Thailand) Port
4	MF	Krit Aransanyalak	27 March 2001 (aged 23)	(Football Association of Thailand) Chonburi Bluewave
5	DF	Ronnachai Jungwongsuk	4 March 1997 (aged 27)	(Football Association of Thailand) Chonburi Bluewave
6	DF	Jirawat Sornwichian	23 October 1988 (aged 35)	(Football Association of Thailand) Black Pearl United
7	MF	Panat Kittipanuwong	14 May 1998 (aged 25)	(Football Association of Thailand) Black Pearl United
8	MF	Worasak Srirangpirot	26 December 1992 (aged 31)	(Football Association of Thailand) Hongyen Thakam
9	FW	Suphawut Thueanklang	14 July 1989 (aged 34)	(Football Association of Thailand) Chonburi Bluewave
10	DF	Itticha Praphaphan	31 December 1991 (aged 32)	(Football Association of Thailand) Port
11	FW	Muhammad Osamanmusa	19 January 1998 (aged 26)	(Royal Spanish Football Federation) Córdoba
12	GK	Katawut Hankampa	27 May 1992 (aged 31)	(Football Association of Thailand) Bangkok BTS
13	MF	Therdsak Charoenphong	23 November 1996 (aged 27)	(Football Association of Thailand) Hongyen Thakam
14	FW	Apiwat Chaemcharoen	31 March 1991 (aged 33)	(Football Association of Thailand) Chonburi Bluewave

=== Vietnam ===
The final squad was announced on 13 April 2024.

Head coach: (Argentina) Diego Giustozzi

No.	Pos.	Player	Date of birth (age)	Club
1	GK	Hồ Văn Ý	1 January 1997 (aged 27)	(Vietnam Football Federation) Thai Son Nam
2	GK	Nguyễn Hữu Phúc	7 December 1994 (aged 29)	(Vietnam Football Federation) Savinest Khánh Hòa
3	MF	Ngô Ngọc Sơn	24 March 1995 (aged 29)	(Vietnam Football Federation) Sahako
4	MF	Châu Đoàn Phát	14 March 1999 (aged 25)	(Vietnam Football Federation) Thai Son Nam
5	DF	Nguyễn Mạnh Dũng	9 June 1997 (aged 26)	(Vietnam Football Federation) Thai Son Nam
6	MF	Phạm Đức Hòa (Captain)	12 April 1991 (aged 33)	(Vietnam Football Federation) Thai Son Nam
7	MF	Nguyễn Anh Duy	20 September 1994 (aged 29)	(Vietnam Football Federation) Thai Son Nam
8	FW	Đào Minh Quảng	28 November 2000 (aged 23)	(Vietnam Football Federation) Thai Son Nam
9	MF	Trần Thái Huy	12 October 1995 (aged 28)	(Vietnam Football Federation) Thai Son Nam
10	FW	Nguyễn Thịnh Phát	10 June 1997 (aged 26)	(Vietnam Football Federation) Thai Son Nam
11	FW	Chu Văn Tiến	19 September 1996 (aged 27)	(Vietnam Football Federation) Sahako
12	MF	Từ Minh Quang	1 November 1998 (aged 25)	(Vietnam Football Federation) Thái Sơn Bắc
13	DF	Nhan Gia Hưng	13 July 2002 (aged 21)	(Vietnam Football Federation) Thai Son Nam
14	MF	Trần Nhật Trung	21 March 1997 (aged 27)	(Vietnam Football Federation) Sahako

== Group B ==
=== Australia ===
The final squad was announced on 3 April 2024.

Head coach: (Australia) Miles Downie

No.	Pos.	Player	Date of birth (age)	Club
1	GK	Domenic Badolato	23 July 1996 (aged 27)	(Football Australia) Enfield Allstars
2	DF	Tyler Garner		(Football Australia) Rockingham Cambio Cumbre
3	DF	Adam Cooper	18 April 1992 (aged 31)	(Football Australia) Moreland
4	MF	Dominic Cox	4 August 1996 (aged 27)	(Football Australia) Enfield Allstars
5	DF	Jordan Guerreiro		(Football Australia) Mountain Majik
6	MF	Wade Giovenali		(Football Australia) Dural Warriors
7	MF	Scott Rogan		(Football Australia) Fitzroy Tigers
8	MF	Daniel Fornito		(Football Australia) Mascot Vipers
9	FW	Grant Lynch	4 August 1993 (aged 30)	(Football Australia) UTS Northside
10	FW	Shervin Adeli	4 May 1992 (aged 31)	(Football Australia) Enfield Allstars
11	MF	Ethan De Melo		(Football Australia) Mascot Vipers
12	GK	Aaron Yu		(Football Australia) Western City
13	FW	Michael Kouta	4 September 1997 (aged 26)	(Football Australia) Enfield Allstars
14	DF	Jamie Dib		(Football Australia) Mountain Majik

=== Iraq ===
The final squad was announced on 17 April 2024.

Head coach: (Brazil) Cacau

No.	Pos.	Player	Date of birth (age)	Club
1	GK	Hussein Ahmed		
2	FP	Fahad Al-Azzawi		
3	FP	Ali Shihab		
4	FP	Muheb Al-Taie		
5	FP	Mustafa Al-Bayati		
6	FP	Harith Al-Obaidi		
7	FP	Salim Al-Husaynat		
8	FP	Ghaith Riadh		
9	FP	Salim Kadhim		
10	FP	Mohanad Abdul-Hadi		
11	FP	Haedr Al-Ogaili		
12	GK	Zaher Mahdi		
13	FP	Tareq Zeyad		
14	FP	Waleed Al-Mayali		

=== Saudi Arabia ===
Head coach: (Spain) Andreu Plaza

No.	Pos.	Player	Date of birth (age)	Club
1	GK	Humood Al-Dahhan		
2	GK	Mohammed Ahmed		
3	FP	Nasser Al-Harthi		
4	FP	Nawaf Aroan		
5	FP	Abdulilah Al-Otaibi		
6	FP	Abdullah Al-Maghrabi		
7	FP	Eihab Mohamed		
8	FP	Fahad Al-Johani		
9	FP	Abdulleh Al-Dossary		
10	FP	Moath Al-Asiri		
11	FP	Fares Al-Maleh		
12	FP	Abdullah Al-Aqeeli		
13	GK	Mahdi Al-Harqan		
14	FP	Farhan Al-Asmari		

=== Uzbekistan ===
The final squad was announced on 11 April 2024.

Head coach: (Spain) José Venancio López Hierro

No.	Pos.	Player	Date of birth (age)	Club
1	GK	Sunnatjon Anvarov	5 September 1998 (aged 25)	(Uzbekistan Football Association) Bunyodkor
2	FP	Fazliddin Botirov	12 November 2004 (aged 19)	(Uzbekistan Football Association) Maxam Chirchiq
3	FP	Mashrab Adilov	15 August 1994 (aged 29)	(Uzbekistan Football Association) BMB
4	FP	Ikhtiyor Ropiev	19 September 1993 (aged 30)	(Uzbekistan Football Association) Oil Star
5	FP	Sunatulla Juraev	24 December 1994 (aged 29)	(Uzbekistan Football Association) OKMK
6	FP	Ilkhomjon Khamroev	25 September 1997 (aged 26)	(Uzbekistan Football Association) Oil Star
7	FP	Dilshod Rakhmatov	4 December 1989 (aged 34)	(Uzbekistan Football Association) Oil Star
8	FP	Khusniddin Nishonov	19 May 1998 (aged 25)	(Uzbekistan Football Association) Oil Star
9	FP	Elbek Tulkinov	24 December 2000 (aged 23)	(Uzbekistan Football Association) OKMK
10	FP	Akbar Usmonov	9 March 1997 (aged 27)	(Uzbekistan Football Association) BMB
11	FP	Abror Akhmetzyanov	22 May 2004 (aged 19)	(Uzbekistan Football Association) Maxam Chirchiq
12	GK	Abbos Elmurodov	4 September 1998 (aged 25)	(Uzbekistan Football Association) BMB
13	FP	Mekhroj Khudoyberdiev	30 November 1996 (aged 27)	(Uzbekistan Football Association) Dinamo
14	FP	Samariddin Berkinov	18 July 2000 (aged 23)	(Uzbekistan Football Association) Dinamo

== Group C ==
=== Japan ===
The final squad was announced on 28 March 2024.

Head coach: (Japan) Kenichiro Kogure

No.	Pos.	Player	Date of birth (age)	Club
1	GK	Higor Pires	7 July 1980 (aged 43)	(Japan Football Association) Bardral Urayasu
2	GK	Guilherme Kuromoto	16 May 1986 (aged 37)	(Japan Football Association) Shinagawa City
3	DF	Kaito Yamada	30 March 2000 (aged 24)	(Royal Spanish Football Federation) Inter Movistar
4	DF	Kentaro Ishida	1 January 1998 (aged 26)	(Japan Football Association) Bardral Urayasu
5	DF	Kazuhiro Nibuya	13 December 1987 (aged 36)	(Japan Football Association) Vasagey Oita
6	MF	Tomoki Yoshikawa	3 February 1989 (aged 35)	(Japan Football Association) Nagoya Oceans
7	MF	Shoto Yamanaka	30 July 2002 (aged 21)	(Japan Football Association) Pescadola Machida
8	MF	Yuta Tsutsumi	7 October 1998 (aged 25)	(Japan Football Association) Shinagawa City
9	FW	António Hirata	16 November 1995 (aged 28)	(Royal Spanish Football Federation) FS García
10	MF	Sora Kanazawa	26 December 2001 (aged 22)	(Japan Football Association) Nagoya Oceans
11	DF	Ryohei Ando	3 February 1988 (aged 36)	(Japan Football Association) Nagoya Oceans
12	MF	Ryoto Kai	20 July 2001 (aged 22)	(Japan Football Association) Nagoya Oceans
13	MF	Takumi Nagasaka	8 November 1994 (aged 29)	(Japan Football Association) Bardral Urayasu
14	FW	Yūsei Arai	1 November 1995 (aged 28)	(Japan Football Association) Shinagawa City

=== Kyrgyzstan ===
The final squad was announced on 18 April 2024.

Head coach: (Spain) Lluís Bernat

No.	Pos.	Player	Date of birth (age)	Club
1	GK	Ulanbek Chorobek uulu	7 July 1980 (aged 43)	(Kyrgyz Football Union) Alay
2	GK	Bekbolot Akmataliev	13 November 1994 (aged 29)	(Kyrgyz Football Union) Osh State University
3	FP	Donierbek Amanbaev	10 October 1997 (aged 26)	(Russian Football Union) SIB-Tranzit
4	FP	Arstanbek Tursunov	16 December 1998 (aged 25)	(Kyrgyz Football Union) Alay
5	FP	Adil Boskunchiev		(Kyrgyz Football Union) Naryn
6	FP	Semetei Murzakulov	27 December 2003 (aged 20)	Unattached
7	FP	Shokhrukh Makhmadaminov	16 July 1998 (aged 25)	(Georgian Football Federation) New Vision Georgians
8	FP	Denisbek Amandyk uulu	13 November 1994 (aged 29)	(Kyrgyz Football Union) Osh State University
9	FP	Maksat Alimov	3 August 1990 (aged 33)	(Kyrgyz Football Union) Forwater-Aman
10	FP	Mukhamed Askarbekov	29 June 2001 (aged 22)	(Kyrgyz Football Union) Osh State University
11	FP	Daniiar Talaibekov	30 November 1996 (aged 27)	(Kyrgyz Football Union) Dordoi
12	FP	Daniiar Abdurakhim uulu		
13	FP	Kairat Kubanychov	16 June 1999 (aged 24)	(Kyrgyz Football Union) Alay
14	FP	Samat Dzhanat uulu	11 September 2002 (aged 21)	(Kyrgyz Football Union) Forwater-Aman

=== South Korea ===
The final squad was announced on 4 April 2024.

Head coach: (South Korea) Lee Chang-hwan

No.	Pos.	Player	Date of birth (age)	Club
1	GK	Han Sang-seok	14 May 1997 (aged 26)	(Korea Football Association) Nowon FS
2	GK	Park Jun-su	16 October 1994 (aged 29)	(Korea Football Association) Nowon FS
3	MF	Eom Ji-yong	9 July 2003 (aged 20)	(Football Association of Malaysia) Kuala Lumpur City
4	DF	Kyoung Jeong-soo	22 November 1997 (aged 26)	(Korea Football Association) Goyang Bulls
5	MF	Lim Seung-ju	11 August 1997 (aged 26)	(Korea Football Association) Nowon FS
6	MF	Kwak Ki-cheol	3 August 1997 (aged 26)	(Korea Football Association) Nowon FS
7	MF	Moon Hee-jae	17 May 1995 (aged 28)	(Korea Football Association) Gyeonggi LBFS
8	MF	Kim Seung-hyun	1 August 1994 (aged 29)	(Korea Football Association) Nowon FS
9	FW	Lee Han-wool	3 September 1992 (aged 31)	(Korea Football Association) Gangwon FC
10	FW	Eom Tae-youn	23 September 1994 (aged 29)	(Korea Football Association) Nowon FS
11	MF	Lee Jin-hyuk	20 December 1995 (aged 28)	(Korea Football Association) Gumi FS
12	MF	Kim Yun-young	6 November 2000 (aged 23)	(Korea Football Association) Nowon FS
13	DF	Park Jun-sung	24 March 1998 (aged 26)	(Korea Football Association) Nowon FS
14	DF	Yoo Kyung-dong	11 December 1997 (aged 26)	(Korea Football Association) Gyeonggi LBFS

=== Tajikistan ===
The final squad was announced on 7 April 2024.

Head coach: (Tajikistan) Pairav Vohidov

No.	Pos.	Player	Date of birth (age)	Club
1	GK	Murodullo Alikulov	9 June 1987 (aged 36)	(Tajikistan Football Federation) Amonatbank
2	GK	Firuz Bozmamadov		(Tajikistan Football Federation) Istiklol
3	FP	Abduqaiyum Umarov		(Tajikistan Football Federation) Istiklol
4	FP	Nasratsho Ismoilov	20 January 2002 (aged 22)	(Tajikistan Football Federation) Istiklol
5	FP	Samandar Rizomov	5 January 2001 (aged 23)	(Tajikistan Football Federation) Soro Company
6	FP	Idris Yorov	18 September 2000 (aged 23)	(Tajikistan Football Federation) Soro Company
7	FP	Bahodur Khojaev		(Tajikistan Football Federation) Istaravshan
8	FP	Muhamadjon Sharipov	12 September 1997 (aged 26)	(Tajikistan Football Federation) Istiklol
9	FP	Fayzali Sardorov	8 April 1998 (aged 26)	(Tajikistan Football Federation) Soro Company
10	FP	Nekruz Alimakhmadov	10 August 1995 (aged 28)	(Tajikistan Football Federation) Istiklol
11	FP	Komron Aliev	15 October 1998 (aged 25)	(Football Federation of Belarus) UVD-Dinamo Grodno
12	FP	Umed Kuziev	17 December 1997 (aged 26)	(Tajikistan Football Federation) Amonatbank
13	FP	Bakhtiyor Soliev	16 December 2001 (aged 22)	(Tajikistan Football Federation) Soro Company
14	FP	Dilshod Salomov	5 October 1995 (aged 28)	(Tajikistan Football Federation) Soro Company

== Group D ==
=== Afghanistan ===
The final squad was announced on 16 April 2024.

Head coach: (Iran) Majid Mortezaei Abroudi

No.	Pos.	Player	Date of birth (age)	Club
1	GK	Mohammad Javad Safari		
2	GK	Alireza Jafari		
3	GK	Ali Ahmad Mohseni		
4	DF	Mahdi Norowzi		
5	DF	Ali Jafari		
6	DF	Maysam Faizi		
7	MF	Reza Hosseinpour		
8	MF	Mehran Gholami		
9	MF	Omid Qanbari		
10	MF	Akbar Kazemi		
11	MF	Mohammad Moradi	6 June 2006 (aged 17)	
12	FW	Farzad Mahmoodi		
13	FW	Hussain Mohammadi		
14	FW	Sayed Mojtaba		

=== Bahrain ===
The final squad was announced on 10 April 2024.

Head coach: (Portugal) Rafael Fogageiro

No.	Pos.	Player	Date of birth (age)	Club
1	GK	Amin Mohamed		
2	FP	Saleh Mukhallaf		
3	FP	Hasan Ebrahim		
4	FP	Sayed Al-Mahfoodh		
5	FP	Hamed Abdulla		
6	FP	Ammar Hasan		
7	FP	Hasan Mohamed		
8	FP	Mohamed Al-Sandi		
9	FP	Mohamed Abdulla		
10	FP	Jassam Anan		
11	FP	Mirza Al-Noaimi		
12	FP	Ali Al-Araibi		
13	GK	Sayed Fadhel		
14	GK	Sayed Mohamed		

=== Iran ===
The final squad was announced on 13 April 2024.

Head coach: (Iran) Vahid Shamsaei

No.	Pos.	Player	Date of birth (age)	Club
1	GK	Bagher Mohammadi	21 June 1991 (aged 32)	(Football Federation Islamic Republic of Iran) Ghand Katrin Amol
2	GK	Saeid Momeni	23 November 1992 (aged 31)	(Football Federation Islamic Republic of Iran) Crop
3	FP	Ali Khalilvand		(Football Federation Islamic Republic of Iran) Giti Pasand
4	FP	Alireza Rafieipour	9 October 1993 (aged 30)	(Football Federation Islamic Republic of Iran) Crop
5	FP	Hossein Derakhshani	1 April 1993 (aged 31)	(Football Federation Islamic Republic of Iran) Giti Pasand
6	FP	Mohammad Reza Sangsefidi	2 November 1989 (aged 34)	(Football Federation Islamic Republic of Iran) Giti Pasand
7	FP	Ali Asghar Hassanzadeh	2 November 1987 (aged 36)	(Football Federation Islamic Republic of Iran) Mes Sungun
8	FP	Moslem Oladghobad	29 November 1995 (aged 28)	(Royal Spanish Football Federation) Palma
9	FP	Saeid Ahmadabbasi	31 July 1992 (aged 31)	(Royal Spanish Football Federation) Valdepeñas
10	FP	Salar Aghapour	7 March 2000 (aged 24)	(Football Federation Islamic Republic of Iran) Mes Sungun
11	FP	Mahdi Karimi	28 January 1997 (aged 27)	(Football Federation Islamic Republic of Iran) Giti Pasand
12	FP	Ali Akrami		(Football Federation Islamic Republic of Iran) Crop
13	FP	Masoud Yousef	27 October 2000 (aged 23)	
14	FP	Behrooz Azimi		

=== Kuwait ===
Head coach: (Iran) Mohammad Nazemasharieh

No.	Pos.	Player	Date of birth (age)	Club
1	GK	Mohammad Al-Huzaim		
3	FP	Mohammad Al-Ajmi		
4	FP	Ahmad Al-Farsi		
5	FP	Bader Al-Mansour		
6	FP	Sulaiman Al-Omran		
7	FP	Abdulrahman Al-Tawail	3 February 1991 (aged 33)	
8	FP	Omar Al-Mansour		
9	FP	Naser Al-Alban		
10	FP	Abdullatif Al-Abasi		
11	FP	Najeeb Ali		
12	GK	Mohammad Majeki		
13	FP	Salman Al-Baeijan		
14	FP	Saleh Al-Fadhel		
