= Sports in Tokyo =

Tokyo is a major center for sports in Japan. Its professional sports teams compete in baseball, football (soccer), sumo and basketball. It hosted the 1964 Summer Olympics and 2020 Summer Olympics.

== Overview ==
Two professional baseball clubs make their home in Tokyo. They are the Yakult Swallows (at Meiji-Jingu Stadium) and Yomiuri Giants (at Tokyo Dome

The Japan Sumo Association is also headquartered in Tokyo at the Ryōgoku Kokugikan sumo arena where three official sumo tournaments are held annually (in January, May, and September).

Football clubs in Tokyo include FC Tokyo and Tokyo Verdy, both of which play at Ajinomoto Stadium in Chōfu.

Tokyo hosted the 1964 Summer Olympics. National Stadium, also known as Olympic Stadium, Tokyo is host to a number of international sporting events. With a number of world-class sports venues, Tokyo often hosts national and international sporting events such as tennis tournaments, swim meets, marathons, American futbol exhibition games, judo, and karate. In 2013, Tokyo was announced as the host of the 2020 Summer Olympics.

Tokyo Metropolitan Gymnasium, in Sendagaya, Shibuya, is a large sports complex that includes pools, training rooms, and a large indoor arena.

Tokyo hosted the official 1967 Women's Volleyball World Championship and was one of the host cities for the 1998, 2006 and 2010 editions. Further, it hosted the official 1971 Asian Basketball Championship for men and the official 1982 Asian Basketball Championship for Women.

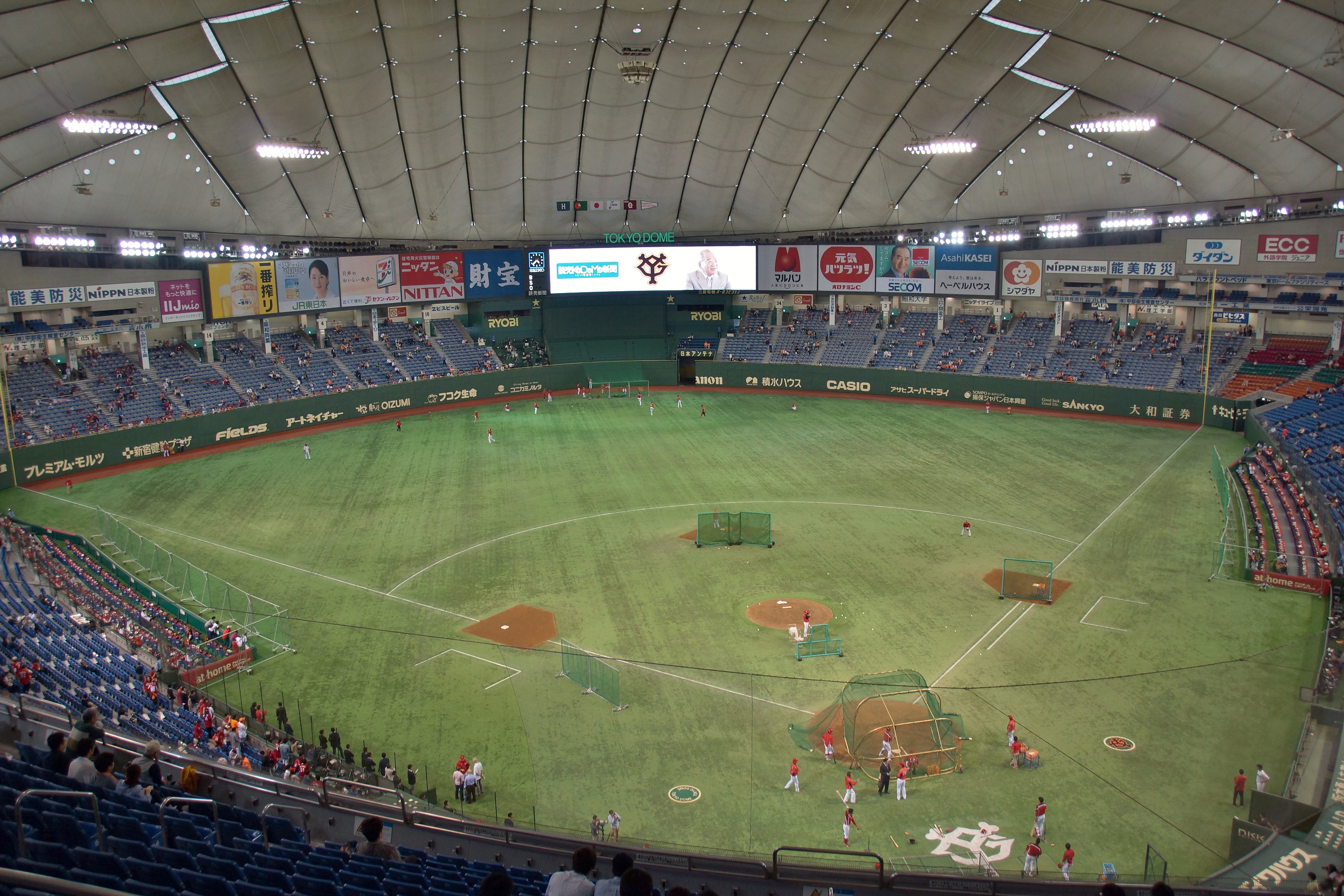
Tokyo Dome, home ground of Yomiuri Giants

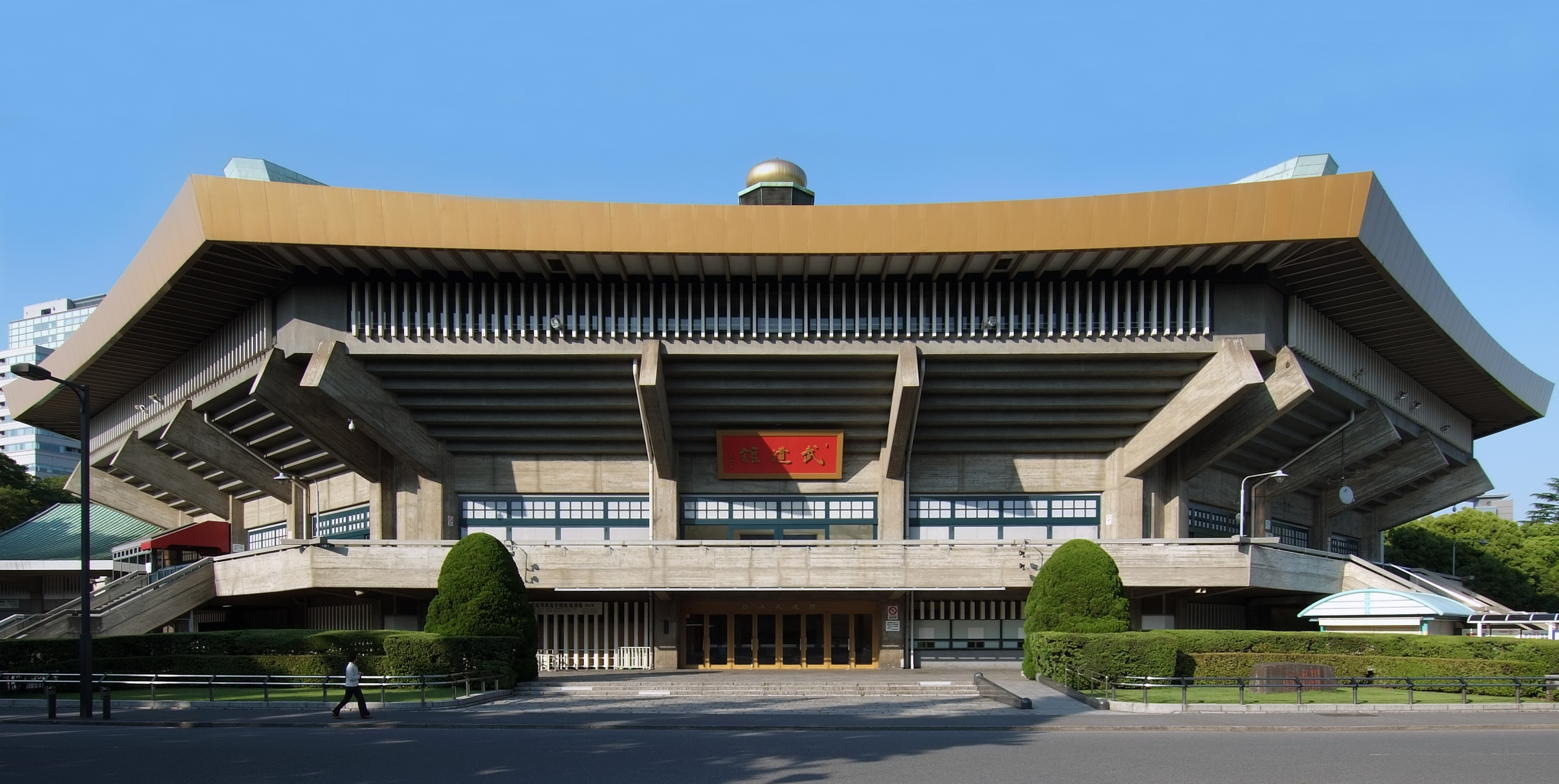
Nippon Budokan arena

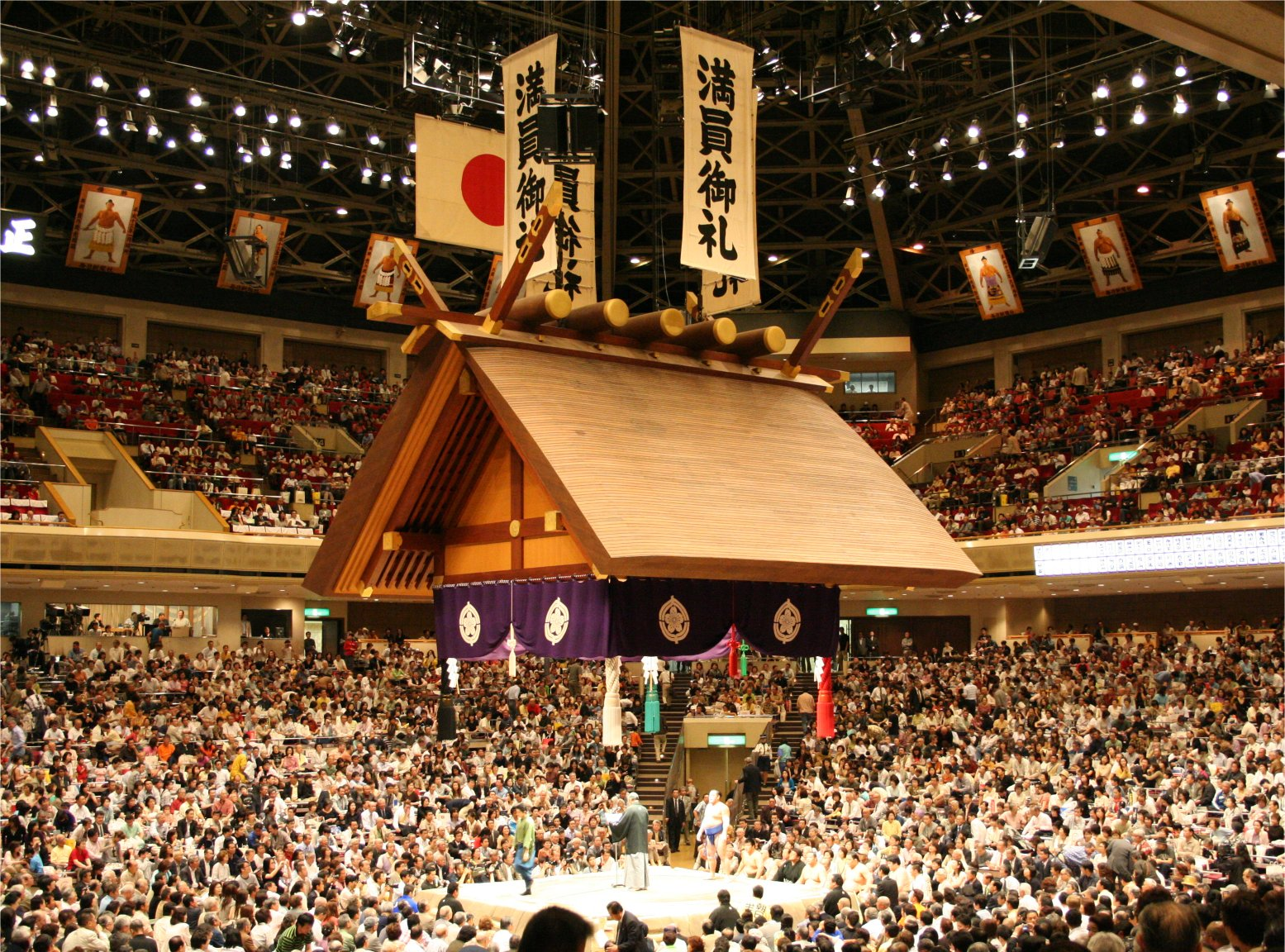
Ryōgoku Kokugikan sumo wrestling arena

== Sports teams in Tokyo ==
=== Football (soccer) ===
- Aries Toshima (KSL Div. 1)
- Criacao Shinjuku (JFL)
- Edo All United (KSL Div. 2)
- Hitachi Building System SC (KSL Div. 2)
- FC Korea (Tokyo League Div. 2)
- Machida Zelvia (J1 League)
- Nankatsu SC (KSL Div. 1)
- Nippon University SC (KSL Div. 1)
- Shibuya City FC (KSL Div. 2)
- FC Tokyo (J1 League)
- Tokyo 23 FC (KSL Div. 1)
- Tokyo Shukyu-Dan (Tokyo League Div. 1)
- Tokyo United (KSL Div. 1)
- Tokyo Verdy (J1 League)
- Yokogawa Musashino (JFL)

=== Futsal ===
- Fugador Sumida (F.League Div 1)
- Ligarevia Katsushika (F.League Div 2)
- Pescadola Machida (F.League Div 1)
- Shinagawa City (F.League Div 1)
- Tachikawa Athletic (F.League Div 1)

=== Baseball ===
- Tokyo Yakult Swallows (Shinjuku)
- Yomiuri Giants (Bunkyō)

=== Basketball ===
- Alvark Tokyo (Shibuya)
- Sun Rockers Shibuya (Shibuya)

=== Volleyball ===
- NEC Blue Rockets (Fuchū)

=== Rugby ===
- Black Rams Tokyo (Setagaya)
- Tokyo Sungoliath (Fuchū)
- Toshiba Brave Lupus Tokyo (Fuchū)

=== Tennis ===
Tokyo hosts one of the ten prestigious Tier I tournaments on the women's tennis tour (WTA) and it takes place in September after the US Open. Tokyo also hosts a tennis event on the men's ATP tour.

=== Olympics ===
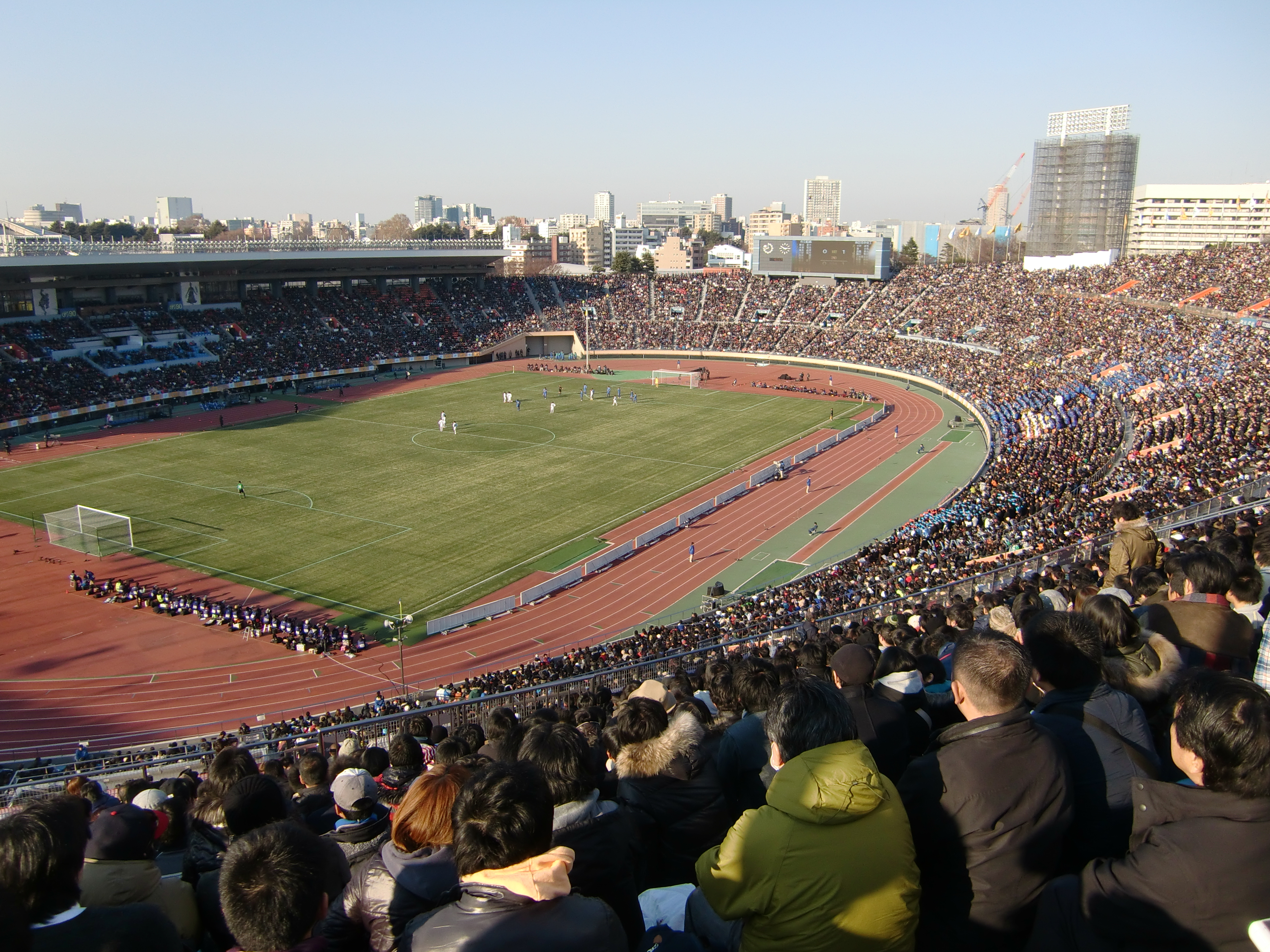
Tokyo Olympic Stadium

Tokyo was scheduled to host the 1940 Summer Olympics, until they were canceled due to the outbreak of World War II. The city subsequently hosted the 1964 Summer Olympics, which was the first time the Olympic Games were held in Asia. On September 7, 2013, Tokyo was elected as the host city of the 2020 Summer Olympics. Tokyo was the first Asian city to host the Olympics twice.
