= F.League Ocean Cup =

- Founded: 2008
- Country: Japan
- Number of clubs: 20
- Current champions: Nagoya Oceans (2023)
- Most championships: Nagoya Oceans (10 titles)
- Website: www.fleague.jp/leaguecup
- Current: 2023 F.League Ocean Cup

F.League Ocean Cup (in Japanese: "Fリーグオーシャンカップ") is a futsal tournament held in Japan. The organizer is the Japan Football Association (JFA) and Japan Futsal Federation (JFF). This tournament is a league cup of the F.League. In 2019, 20 teams participated in this tournament.

== History ==
In 2008, Takeda Teva Ocean Arena was completed as Asia's first full-scale futsal arena. In June 2008 this tournament was held for the first time. The organizer of the first tournament was not the Japan Football Association (JFA) but the Aichi Football Association. As of 2009, this tournament is the official league cup of the F.League.

In 2013, Teva Takeda Pharma Ltd. withdrew from the tournament sponsors, so this tournament name was changed to the F.League Ocean Arena Cup. In 2014, the venue was moved from the Takeda Teva Ocean Arena to the Odawara Arena, so this tournament name was changed to the F.League Ocean Cup. In 2015, this tournament was held at the Kobe Green Arena and Kobe Central Gymnasium. In 2016, this tournament was not held.

== Competition name ==
- Taiyo Yakuhin Ocean Arena Cup (2008)
- F.League Taiyo Yakuhin Ocean Arena Cup (2009–2011)
- F.League Teva Ocean Arena Cup (2012)
- F.League Ocean Arena Cup (2013)
- F.League Ocean Cup (2014–present)

== Results ==
#	Year	Final			3rd place playoff		
#	Year	Champions	result	2nd place	3rd place	result	4th place
1	2008	Shriker Osaka	4–4 (PK 4–2)	Nagoya Oceans	Bardral Urayasu	6–2	Pescadola Machida
2	2009	Shriker Osaka	2–2 (PK 5–4)	Nagoya Oceans	Deução Kobe	5–2	Espolada Hokkaido
3	2010	Nagoya Oceans	4–0	Shriker Osaka	Espolada Hokkaido	8–4	Vasagey Oita
4	2011	Nagoya Oceans	5–0	Shriker Osaka	Vasagey Oita	2–1	Espolada Hokkaido
5	2012	Nagoya Oceans	5–1	Shriker Osaka	Espolada Hokkaido	6–5	Shonan Bellmare
6	2013	Nagoya Oceans	5–1	Fuchu Athletic FC	Shriker Osaka	3–1	Shonan Bellmare
7	2014	Nagoya Oceans	4–3	Pescadola Machida	Shonan Bellmare	1–1 (PK 5–4)	Shriker Osaka
8	2015	Fuchu Athletic FC	6–0	Nagoya Oceans	(Latvia) FK Nikars	1–1 (PK 4–3)	Espolada Hokkaido
The 2006 edition was not held.
9	2017	Nagoya Oceans	5–0	Bardral Urayasu	Shriker Osaka	3–3 (PK 3–2)	Shonan Bellmare
10	2018	Nagoya Oceans	3–0	Shriker Osaka	Pescadola Machida	4–1	Fugador Sumida
11	2019	Nagoya Oceans	7–0	Shonan Bellmare	Pescadola Machida	10–6	Tachikawa Fuchu Athletic
12	2022	Nagoya Oceans	4–3	Tachikawa Athletic	Pescadola Machida	3–2	Shinagawa City
13	2023	Nagoya Oceans	5–1	Bardral Urayasu	Tachikawa Athletic	5–3	Shriker Osaka
14	2024	Nagoya Oceans	4–3	Pescadola Machida	Shriker Osaka	3–3 (PK 5–4)	Tachikawa Athletic

== Number of wins by club ==
#	Clubs	Year
10	Nagoya Oceans	2010, 2011, 2012, 2013, 2014, 2017, 2018, 2019, 2022, 2023
2	Shriker Osaka	2008, 2009
1	Tachikawa Fuchu Athletic FC	2015
