= Athleta (association football brand) =

Brazilian sports equipment

Coordinates: 35°40′06″N 139°42′25″E

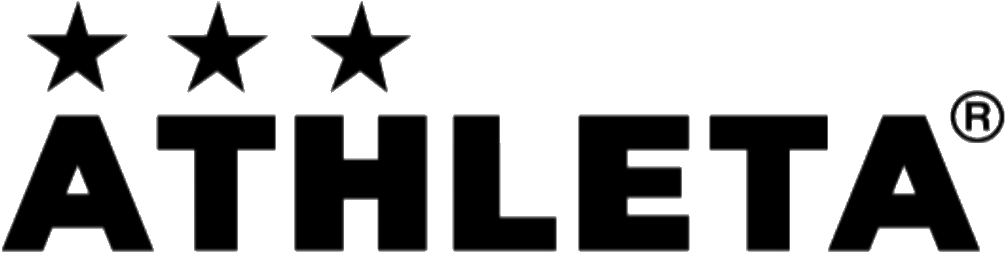
- Product type: Sports equipment
- Current owner: The Brand's Company
- Country: Japan
- Introduced: 1935; 91 years ago in São Paulo
- Markets: Brazil, Japan
- Previous owners: Santa Isabel Textile
- Website: athleta.co.jp

Athleta is a Brazilian-origin Japanese sports equipment brand focused on association football products. The firm manufactures and supplies kit uniforms, balls, and boots.

Athleta was notable for being the brand to supply Brazil national football team the first (now traditional) yellow and green shirts after the team abandoned the white and blue shirt following the Maracanazo in 1950.

== History ==
The brand was created in Belém District, São Paulo, Brazil in 1935 by the company Santa Isabel Textile Manufacturing, founded by Antônio de Oliveira. The brand "Athleta" was chosen by the company to identify its sporting goods. In the beginning, it manufactured socks and shirts for amateur sports.

Athleta's shirt was cotton. When it rained, it weighed about 10 kilos. To take it off, you had to kneel, raise your arms and ask someone to pull. I miss those times.

— Edu, World Champion with Brazil in 1970

In 1954, Athleta became shirt supplier to the Brazil national team, sharing duties with British company Umbro since 1958. Athleta (and Umbro itself) were both manufacturers of Brazil jerseys for the 1958, 1962, and 1970 FIFA World Cups. The production was practically artisanal: the sketches were made by hand on sheets of sulfite and the numbers embroidered in dots. Apart from the national team, Athleta was the brand for several Brazilian clubs including Santos between the 1950s and the 1980s.

In September 2009 the brand reappeared in the market by the Japanese group "The Brand's Company" (TBC), a company specialized in the direction, introduction and development of brands. The resumption of the brand began with the project “The Champions' Shirt”, a limited edition of 1,000 copies of the 31 models used by players in the 1958, 1962 and 1970 World Cups. TBC announced that all proceeds would be donated to the Association of World Champions of Brazil, whose objective was to guarantee a dignified future for athletes who have already played for the national team.

== Sponsorships ==
The following list that are sponsored by Athleta:

=== Association Football ===
==== Clubs teams ====
- (Brazil) America
- (Brazil) Mirassol
- (Brazil) Monte Azul
- (Japan) Blaublitz Akita
- (Japan) FC Maruyasu Okazaki
- (Japan) Kochi United SC
- (Japan) Nippon TV Tokyo Verdy Beleza
- (Japan) Orca Kamogawa FC
- (Japan) Suzuka Point Getters
- (Japan) Tochigi SC
- (Japan) Tokyo Verdy
- (Japan) Azul Claro Numazu
- (Taiwan) EC Desafio Taipei
- (Taiwan) Kaohsiung Attackers

==== Athletes ====
- (Brazil) Leonardo Souza
- (Japan) Noriyoshi Sakai
- (Japan) Junki Koike
- (Japan) Keisuke Oyama
- (Japan) Keigo Numata
- (Japan) Keisuke Fukaya
- (Japan) Ozu Moreira
- (Japan) Takumi Uesato
- (Japan) Teppei Yachida
- (Japan) Ryota Kajikawa
- (Japan) Sho Omori
- (Japan) Yuji Senuma

=== Futsal ===
==== Club teams ====
- (Japan) Deução Kobe
- (Japan) Pescadola Machida
- (Japan) Vasagey Oita

==== Athletes ====
- (Brazil) Leonardo Silva
- (Brazil) Jonathan Araujo
- (Brazil) (Japan) Guilherme Kuromoto
- (Brazil) (Japan) Marcos Honda
- (Japan) Ken Hinenoya
- (Japan) Yuhki Kanayama
- (Japan) Ito Keita
- (Japan) Gensuke Mori
- (Japan) Ryoto Kai
- (Japan) Yudai Takahashi
- (Japan) Yuta Kokado
- (Japan) Takumi Nagasawa
- (Japan) Kentarō Ishida
- (Japan) Yuto Nishimura
- (Japan) Keigo Shibayama
- (Japan) Mitsuru Nakamura
- (Japan) Yusei Arai
- (Japan) Shota Horigome
- (Japan) Yuta Kimura
- (Japan) Hyuga Saito
- (Japan) Shuto Nakata
- (Japan) Yuta Tsutsumi
- (Japan) Yuki Nochimura
- (Japan) Yukari Miyahara
- (Japan) Kaho Ito
- (Japan) Sara Oino
- (Portugal) Arthur Guilherme

== Past Sponsorships ==
=== Association football ===
==== Associations ====
- (Brazil) FPF

==== National Teams ====
- Brazil (1954–1977)
- Paraguay

==== Club teams ====
- (Brazil) Botafogo (1957–1969)
- (Brazil) Cruzeiro
- (Brazil) Flamengo (1970–79)
- (Brazil) Fluminense
- (Brazil) Grêmio
- (Brazil) Internacional
- (Brazil) Juventus
- (Brazil) Palmeiras (1960–67)
- (Brazil) Portuguesa
- (Brazil) Santos (1956–1979)
- (Brazil) São Bento (2022–23)
- (Brazil) São Paulo (1960–67)
- (Brazil) Vasco da Gama (1963–1978)
- (Japan) Avispa Fukuoka (2015–17)
- (Japan) Okayama Yunogo Belle (2018–2020)
- (Japan) Vanraure Hachinohe (2015–2020)
- (United States) Cosmos (1977–78)

==== Athletes ====
- (Brazil) Pelé
- (Brazil) Félix
- (Brazil) Jairzinho
- (Brazil) Rivellino
- (Brazil) Tostão

=== Futsal ===
==== Club teams ====
- (Brazil) Magnus (2016–2021)
