= Matías Hernán Mayedonchi =

Argentine-born Japanese futsal player

Personal information
- Full name: Matías Hernán Mayedonchi
- Date of birth: February 18, 1989 (age 37)
- Place of birth: Buenos Aires, Argentina
- Height: 1.71 m (5 ft 7 1/2 in)
- Position: Universal

Team information
- Current team: Shriker Osaka

Senior career*
Years	Team	Apps	(Gls)
2009–2011	Nagoya Oceans B		
2012–2017	Nagoya Oceans		
2017-2019	Agleymina Hamamatsu		
2019-	Shriker Osaka		

International career^{‡}
2014–	Japan		
- * Club domestic league appearances and goals as of March 15, 2011 ‡ National team caps and goals as of January 10, 2014

Matías Hernán Mayedonchi (前鈍内マティアスエルナン, born 18 February 1989) is an Argentina-born Japanese futsal player who plays for Shriker Osaka. He made his first appearance at Japan national futsal team in a friendly game vs Croatia in 2014.

== Titles ==
- All Japan Futsal Championship (3)
  - 2013, 2014, 2015
- F.League Ocean Cup (3)
  - 2012, 2013, 2014
