= List of Japan international footballers born outside Japan =

This list includes all the Japanese players who played for the Japan senior national football team who are born outside Japan, while others (the minority) are naturalized or born abroad.

== List by country of birth ==
Last update on 25 October 2022

Country	Total	Notes
Brazil	17	
United States	8	
Peru	3	
Canada	2	
Argentina	1	
Bolivia	1	
France	1	
Jamaica	1	
Netherlands	1	
New Zealand	1	
Australia	1	
Finland	1	
Germany	1	
Guam	1	
Spain	1	
Thailand	1	

== Men ==
=== List of Japanese international players ===
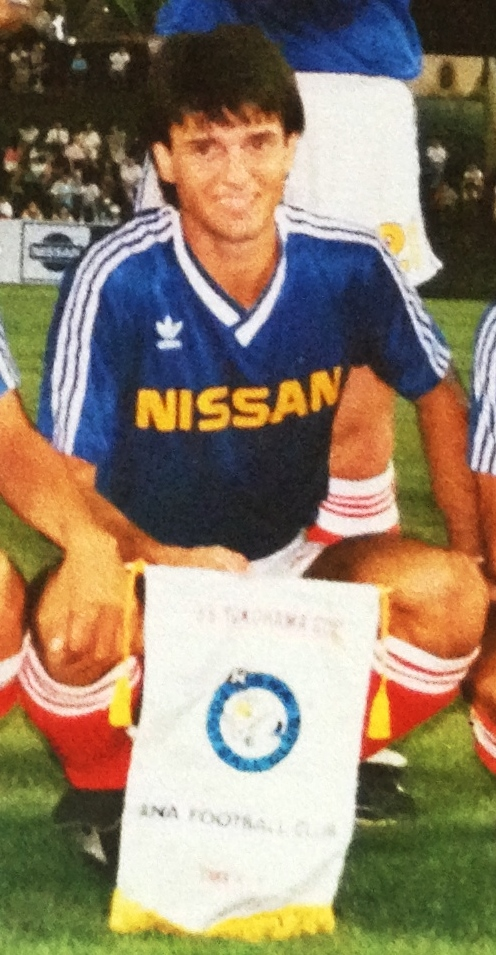
Wagner Lopes has been naturalized as Japanese citizen since September 1997

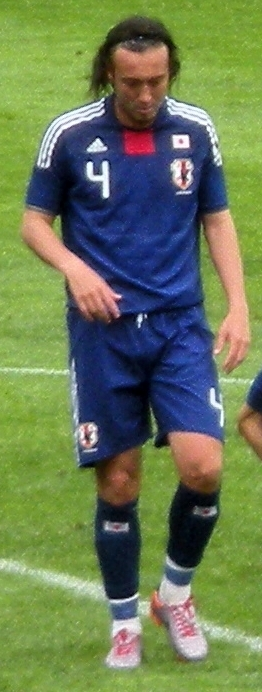
Marcus Tulio Tanaka made 43 appearances for Japan since being naturalized in August 2006

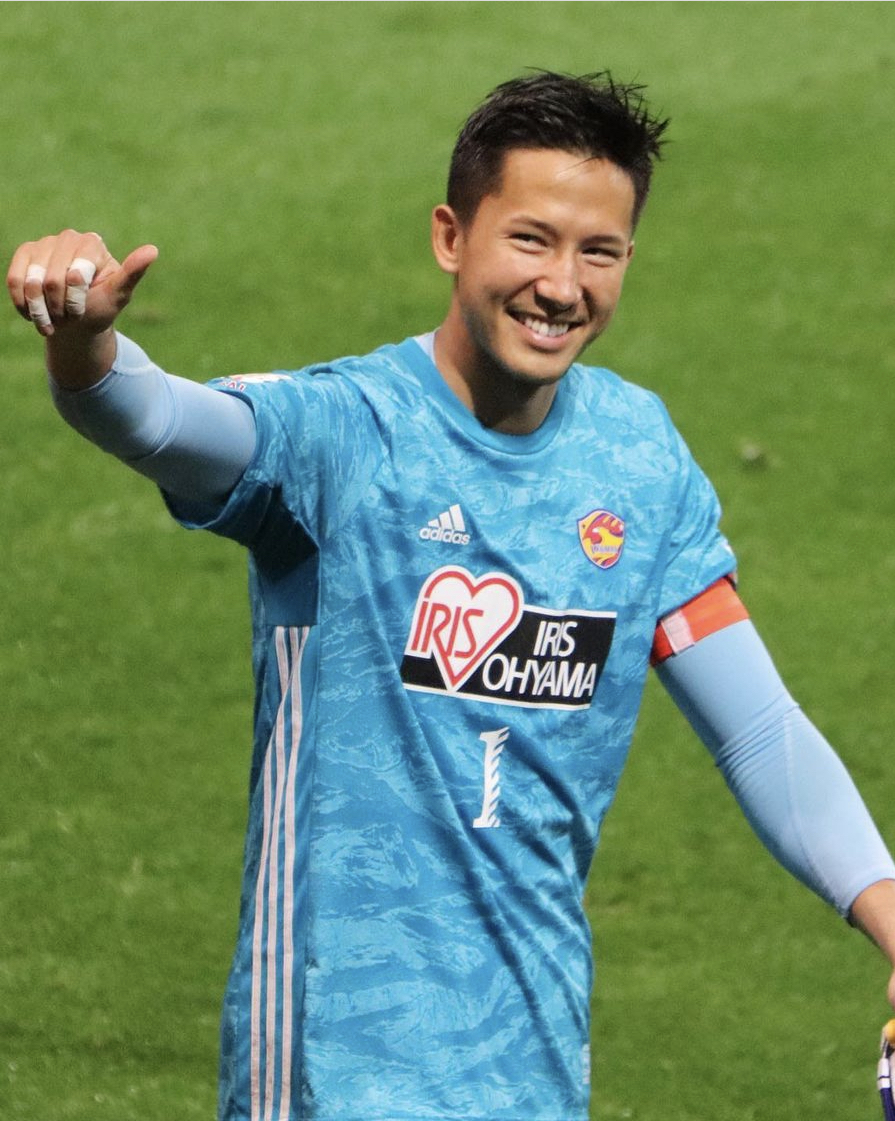
Daniel Schmidt has been naturalized as Japanese citizen since August 2018

List of Japanese international footballers born outside Japanese
Name	Country of birth	Citizenship acquisition	Debut for Japan
Daishiro Yoshimura	Brazil	1967	2 August 1970
George Kobayashi	Brazil	1971	16 July 1972
Ruy Ramos	Brazil	1990	25 September 1990
Wagner Lopes	Brazil	1997	27 September 1997
Alessandro Santos	Brazil	2001	20 March 2002
Marcus Tulio Tanaka	Brazil	2003	8 August 2006
Daniel Schmidt	United States	2014	30 August 2018
Musashi Suzuki	Jamaica	2016	22 March 2019

=== Existing Japanese nationality ===
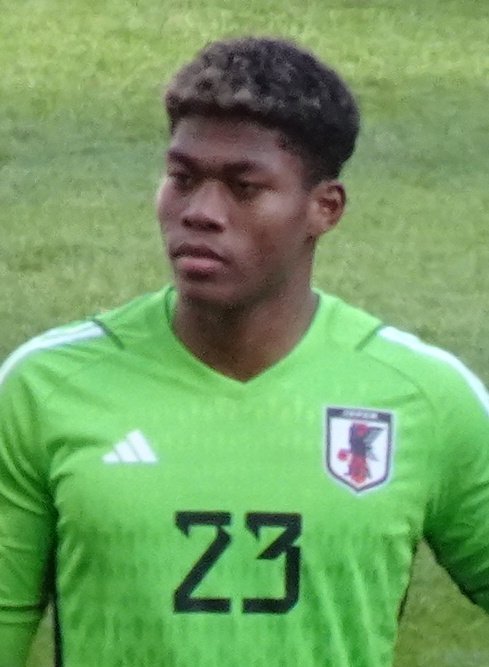
Zion Suzuki played 21 games for Japan after deciding to become a Japanese citizen as a child.

No.	Name	Born	Place of birth	Background(s)	Debut for Japan	National career	Caps	Goals
1	Gōtoku Sakai	1991	(United States) New York City	Germany United States	6 September 2012	2012–2018	42	0
2	Zion Suzuki	2002	(United States) Newark, New Jersey	Ghana United States	19 July 2022	2022–	21	0

=== young players with restored Japanese citizenship ===
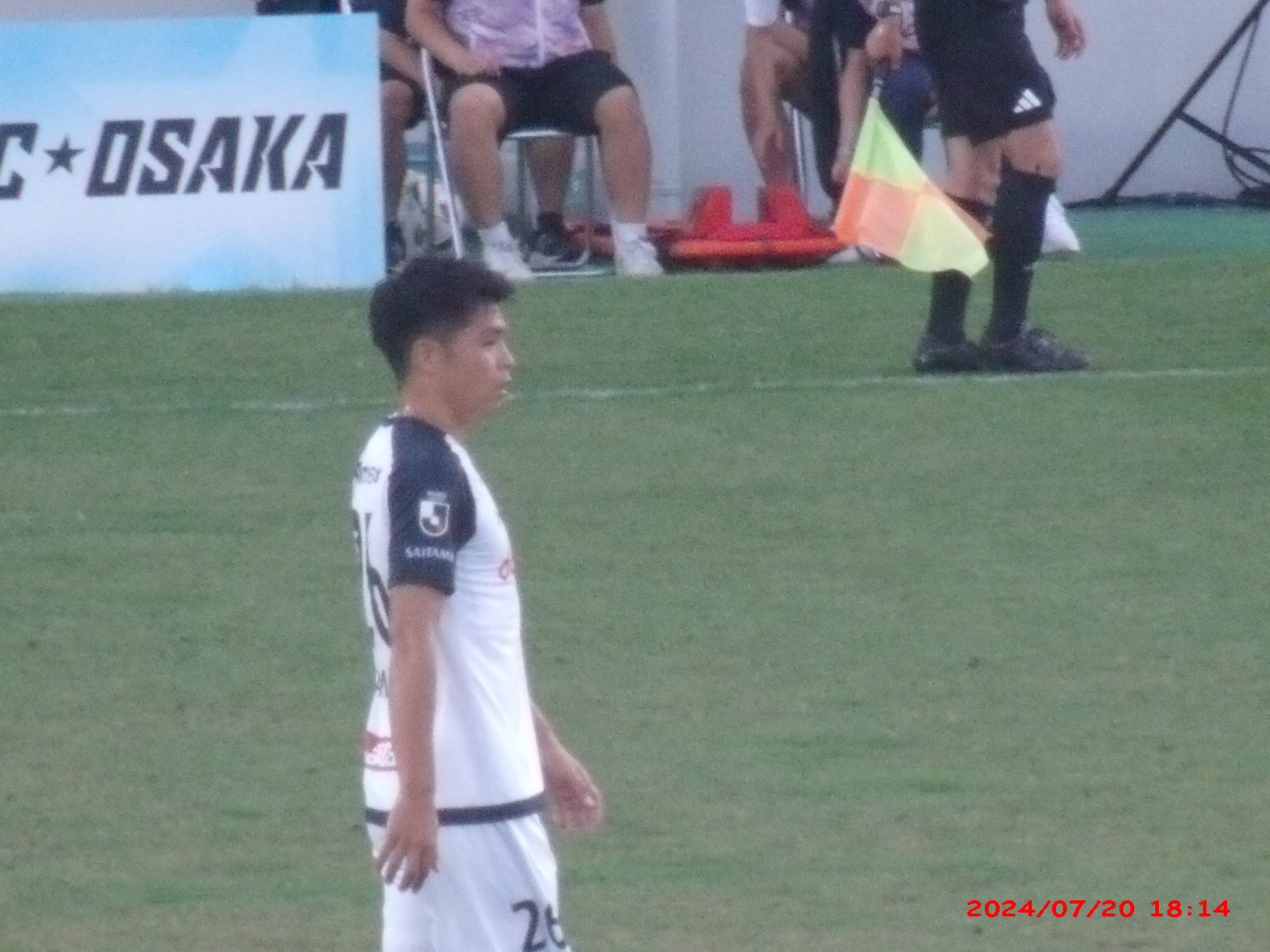
Mizuki Hamada he was born in the United States and decided to represent Japan after obtaining Japanese citizenship in 2008.

The following players were born outside Japan but represent the Japanese national team in the youth level.

No.	Name	Born	Origin	National career	Caps	Goals
1	Sergio Escudero	1988	Spain	2008	5	1
2	Mizuki Hamada	1990	United States	2011	11	2
3	Cy Goddard	1997	England	2013–2014	11	2
4	Daniel Matsuzaka	1997	England	2015	2	0
5	Noah Kenshin Browne	2001	Canada	2016–2018	10	5
6	Louis Yamaguchi	1998	France	2016–2019	9	0
7	Ethan Scally	2008	United States	2025–	6	0

=== Citizens with Japanese ancestry or naturalized Japanese citizens ===
Name	Country of birth	Born
George Yonashiro	Brazil	1950
Edwin Uehara	Peru	1969
Ko Ishikawa	Bolivia	1970
Erikson Noguchipinto	Brazil	1981
Leonardo Moreira	Brazil	1986
Frank Romero	Peru	1987
Michael Fitzgerald	New Zealand	1988
Bruno Suzuki	Brazil	1990
Jelani Reshaun Sumiyoshi	United States	1997
Luís Oyama	Brazil	1997
Leon Morimoto	Guam	2001
Anton Burns	United States	2003
Kai Meriluoto	Finland	2003
Mio Backhaus	Germany	2004
Kaique Kenji	Brazil	2006
Wataru Kamijo	Australia	2006

== Women ==
=== List of Japanese international players ===
Name	Country of birth	Citizenship acquisition	Debut for Japan
Mina Tanaka	Thailand	2010	18 February 2013

== List of players ==
Players in bold are currently playing for Japan futsal men, Japan futsal men U-20 Japan futsal women's, Japan national beach soccer team. The list is updated as 16 October 2022

=== Beach Soccer ===
==== Brazil ====
- Ozu Moreira

=== Women's Futsal ===
==== Argentina ====
- Matías Hernán Mayedonchi

==== Brazil ====
- Arthur Oliveira
- Guilherme Kuromoto
- Higor Pires
- Rikarudo Higa
- Vinicius Crepaldi

==== Peru ====
- Kaoru Morioka

== See also ==
- List of Japan international footballers
