= Nobuya Osodo =

Japanese futsal player

Personal information
- Full name: Nobuya Osodo
- Date of birth: 28 June 1983 (age 43)
- Place of birth: Urawa, Saitama, Japan
- Height: 1.70 m (5 ft 7 in)
- Position: Wing

Team information
- Current team: Shriker Osaka

Senior career*
Years	Team	Apps	(Gls)
2006-2007	Roku FC		
2008-2015	Vasagey Oita		
2015-	Shriker Osaka		

International career
2008-	Japan		
- * Club domestic league appearances and goals

Nobuya Osodo (born 28 June 1983), is a Japanese futsal player who plays for Shriker Osaka and the Japanese national futsal team.

== Title ==
Club

- F.League (1) : 2016-17
- All Japan Futsal Championship (1) : 2017

Individual

- F.League Special Award (1) : 2008-09
- F.League Best 5 (2) : 2012-13, 2013-14

Japan National Futsal Team

- AFC Futsal Championship (1) : 2012
