= All Japan Futsal Championship =

JFA Japan Futsal Championship
- Founded: 1996
- Country: Japan
- Number of clubs: 32
- Current champions: Fugador Sumida (2023)
- Most championships: Nagoya Oceans (6 titles)
- Website: Official website
- Current: 2023 All Japan Futsal Championship

JFA Japan Futsal Championship (in Japanese: "JFA 全日本フットサル選手権大会") is a futsal tournament held in Japan. The organizer is the Japan Football Association (JFA).

== History ==
The first event was held in 1996, earlier than the F. League. From 2005 to 2015, Puma became the sponsor of the tournament, events was also known as the "Puma Cup".

== Statistics ==
#	Year	Champion	2nd place	3rd place
1	1996	Renaiss Gakuen Koka Football Club	Sapporo Football Club	NTT Kyusyu Football Club
2	1997	Fuchu Mizumoto Club	Mitsubishi Chemical Kurosaki Football Club	Hiroshima University Football Club
3	1998	Renaiss Gakuen Koka Football Club	Azul	Yokohama F. Marinos
4	1999	FIRE FOX IPANEMA'S	Tsukuba University Football Club	THE GREAT HOTCH POTCH
5	2000	FIRE FOX IPANEMA'S	ASPA FC	FC Koshirakawa
6	2001	CASCAVEL BANFF	FIRE FOX	BORDON
7	2002	FIRE FOX	Suerte banff	Koganei Jules
8	2003	P.S.T.C LONDRINA	Kankan Boys	CASCAVEL
9	2004	BANFF TOHOKU	FIRE FOX	FUTURO FUTSAL
10	2005	FIRE FOX	EMERSON F.C	Daiwa Sports Nanshin Futsal Club
11	2006	PREDATOR	Forca Verde/BANFF	Takatsuki Matsubara FC
12	2007	Taiyo Yakuhin/BANFF	Fuchu Athletic FC	FIRE FOX
13	2008	Bardral Urayasu	Nagoya Oceans	Shriker Osaka
14	2009	FUGA MEGURO	Nagoya Oceans	Deução Kobe
15	2010	Shriker Osaka	Shonan Bellmare	Deução Kobe
16	2011	The event was canceled on the way because of the Great East Japan Earthquake on March 11, 2011.		
17	2012	Shriker Osaka	Bardral Urayasu	Fuchu Athletic FC
18	2013	Nagoya Oceans	Fuga Sumida	Espolada Hokkaido
19	2014	Nagoya Oceans	Espolada Hokkaido	Bardral Urayasu
20	2015	Nagoya Oceans	Deução Kobe	Pescadola Machida
21	2016	Pescadola Machida	Nagoya Oceans	Bardral Urayasu
22	2017	Shriker Osaka	Fugador Sumida	Fuchu Athletic FC
23	2018	Nagoya Oceans	Shriker Osaka	Shonan Bellmare
24	2019	Nagoya Oceans	Tachikawa Fuchu Athletic	Shriker Osaka; Voscuore Sendai
25	2021	Toruera Kashiwa	Fugador Sumida	Pescadola Machida; Vasagey Oita
26	2022	Tachikawa Athletic	Nagoya Oceans	Bardral Urayasu; Vasagey Oita
27	2023	Fugador Sumida	Shonan Bellmare	Nagoya Oceans; YSCC Yokohama
28	2024	Nagoya Oceans	Tachikawa Athletic	Bardral Urayasu; Pescadola Machida

== Number of wins by club ==
#	Club	Year
6	Nagoya Oceans	2007, 2013, 2014, 2015, 2018, 2019
4	FIRE FOX	1999, 2000, 2002, 2005
3	Shriker Osaka	2010, 2012, 2017
2	Pescadola Machida	2001, 2016
2	Bardral Urayasu	2006, 2008
2	Renaiss Gakuen Koka Football Club	1996, 1998
2	Fugador Sumida	2009, 2023
1	Tachikawa Athletic FC	2022
1	Toruera Kashiwa	2021
1	BANFF TOHOKU	2004
1	Shonan Bellmare	2003
1	Fuchu Mizumoto Club	1997
