= Tomoki Yoshikawa =

Japanese futsal player

Personal information
- Date of birth: 3 February 1989 (age 37)
- Place of birth: Shiga prefecture, Japan
- Height: 1.72 m (5 ft 7 1/2 in)
- Position: Ala

Team information
- Current team: Nagoya Oceans

Senior career*
Years	Team	Apps	(Gls)
2009-2010	Vasagey Oita		
2010-2012	Deução Kobe		
2012-	Nagoya Oceans		
2015-2017	→Magna Gurpea (loan)		

International career
2011-	Japan		
- * Club domestic league appearances and goals

Tomoki Yoshikawa (吉川 智貴, Yoshikawa Tomoki; born 3 February 1989) is a Japanese futsal player who plays for Nagoya Oceans and the Japanese national futsal team.

== Career ==
He was born in Shiga Prefecture, Japan. In March 2007, he graduated Shiga Prefectural Kusatsu Higashi High School. In April 2007, he entered Doshisha University. In 2009, he moved Vasagey Oita in the F.League. In 2010, he moved Deução Kobe. In 2012, he moved Nagoya Oceans. From 2013 to 2014, he was captain of Nagoya Oceans.

In July 2015, he moved to Magna Gurpea in the Spanish First Division on loan. In June 2017, he returned to Nagoya Oceans.

In August 2019, Nagoya Oceans won the AFC Futsal Club Championship, he was selected the Most Valuable Player.

== Title ==
Nagoya Oceans

- AFC Futsal Club Championship (3) : 2014, 2016, 2019
- F.League (5) : 2012–13, 2013–14, 2014–15, 2017–18, 2018-19
- All Japan Futsal Championship (4) : 2013, 2014, 2018, 2019
- F.League Ocean Cup (5) : 2012, 2013, 2014, 2018, 2019

Japan National Futsal Team

- AFC Futsal Championship (1) : 2014

Individual

- F.League Best 5 (1) : 2018-19
- F.League MVP (1) : 2018-19
- AFC Futsal Club Championship MVP (1) : 2019

Sporting positions
Preceded by (Iran) Ali Asghar Hassanzadeh	Asian Futsaler of the Year; 2019	Succeeded by Incumbent
Preceded by (Iran) Mahdi Javid	AFC Futsal Club Championship MVP; 2019	Succeeded by Incumbent
