= 2007–08 F.League =

F. League
- Season: 2007–08
- Champions: Nagoya Oceans

The 2007–08 season of the F. League is the 1st season of top-tier futsal in Japan.

== Teams ==
| Teams | City | Arena | Founded |
|---|---|---|---|
| Bardral Urayasu | Urayasu, Chiba | Urayasu General Gymnasium | 1998 |
| Pescadola Machida | Machida, Tokyo | Machida Municipal General Gymnasium | 1999 |
| Shonan Bellmare | Hiratsuka, Kanagawa | Odawara Arena | 2007 |
| StellAmigo Iwate Hanamaki | Hanamaki, Iwate | Hanamaki Arena | 1996 |
| Nagoya Oceans | Nagoya, Aichi | Taiyo Yakuhin Ocean Arena | 2006 |
| Shriker Osaka | Osaka, Osaka | Osaka Municipal Central Gymnasium | 2002 |
| Deução Kobe | Kobe, Hyogo | Kobe Green Arena | 1993 |
| Vasagey Oita | Ōita, Ōita | Oozu Sports Park | 2003 |

== League table ==
| P | Team | Pts | Pld | W | D | L | GF | GA | GD |
|---|---|---|---|---|---|---|---|---|---|
| 1 | Nagoya Oceans | 53 | 21 | 17 | 2 | 2 | 98 | 33 | +65 |
| 2 | Bardral Urayasu | 47 | 21 | 14 | 5 | 2 | 79 | 39 | +40 |
| 3 | Deucao Kobe | 34 | 21 | 9 | 7 | 5 | 54 | 46 | +8 |
| 4 | ASV Pescadola Machida | 31 | 21 | 10 | 1 | 10 | 88 | 72 | +16 |
| 5 | Shonan Bellmare | 25 | 21 | 8 | 1 | 12 | 58 | 68 | −10 |
| 6 | Vasagey Oita | 20 | 21 | 6 | 2 | 13 | 50 | 83 | −33 |
| 7 | Shriker Osaka | 19 | 21 | 5 | 4 | 12 | 48 | 74 | −26 |
| 8 | StellAmigo Iwate Hanamaki | 11 | 21 | 3 | 2 | 16 | 36 | 96 | −60 |

- Nagoya Oceans Champions of Japan 2007–2008

== Award ==
=== Fairplay ===
- Shonan Bellmare futsal

2007 – 08

=== Individual ===
==== Most Valuable Player (MVP) ====
- Kaoru Morioka (Nagoya)

2007– 08
