= 2013–14 F.League =

F. League
- Season: 2013–14
- Champions: Nagoya Oceans
- AFC Futsal Club Champ.: Nagoya Oceans

The 2013–14 season of the F. League is the 7th season of top-tier futsal in Japan.

== Teams ==
Teams	City	Arena	Founded
Espolada Hokkaido	Sapporo, Hokkaido	Hokkaido Prefectural Sports Center	2008
Bardral Urayasu	Urayasu, Chiba	Urayasu General Gymnasium	1998
Fuchu Athletic F.C.	Fuchū, Tokyo	Fuchu Sports Center	2000
Pescadola Machida	Machida, Tokyo	Machida Municipal General Gymnasium	1999
Shonan Bellmare	Hiratsuka, Kanagawa	Odawara Arena	2007
Agleymina Hamamatsu	Hamamatsu, Shizuoka	Hamamatsu Arena	1996
Nagoya Oceans	Nagoya, Aichi	Taiyo Yakuhin Ocean Arena	2006
Shriker Osaka	Osaka, Osaka	Osaka Municipal Central Gymnasium	2002
Deução Kobe	Kobe, Hyogo	Kobe Green Arena	1993
Vasagey Oita	Ōita, Ōita	Oozu Sports Park	2003

== League table ==
P	Team	Pts	Pld	W	D	L	GF	GA	GD	Qualification
1	Nagoya Oceans	89	36	28	5	3	178	90	+88	AFC Futsal Club Champ.
2	Vasagey Oita	61	36	19	4	13	112	84	+28	Play Off
3	Bardral Urayasu	56	36	16	8	12	91	91	0	Play Off
4	Shriker Osaka	50	36	14	8	14	100	98	+2	Play Off
5	ASV Pescadola Machida	57	36	16	9	11	92	79	+13	Play Off
6	Deucao Kobe	56	36	17	5	14	113	111	+2	Play Off
7	Fuchu Athletic FC	49	36	16	71	19	102	89	+13	
8	Espolada Hokkaido	44	36	13	5	18	93	113	−20	
9	Shonan Bellmare	43	36	12	7	17	99	115	−16	
10	Agleymina Hamamatsu	9	36	9	3	33	70	180	−110	

=== Play Off ===
Round	Arena	Team	Point	Team
Final round 1 2014	(Japan); Nagoya; Ocean Arena	Nagoya Oceans	6–7	Bardral Urayasu
Final round 2 2014	(Japan); Nagoya; Ocean Arena	Nagoya Oceans	7–0	Bardral Urayasu

- Nagoya Oceans Wins the League
- Nagoya Oceans qualification at AFC Futsal Club Championship

Position	Players	Goals
1	PER (Japan) Kaoru Morioka (Nagoya Oceans)	38
2	BRA Bola (Shonan Bellmare)	32
3	BRA Vinicius (Shriker Osaka)	26
4	BRA Ximbinha (Nagoya Oceans)	25
