= Higor Pires =

Japanese futsal player (born 1980)

Personal information
- Date of birth: 7 July 1980 (age 46)
- Place of birth: São Paulo, Brazil
- Height: 1.87 m (6 ft 1 1/2 in)
- Position: Goalkeeper

Team information
- Current team: Bardral Urayasu

Senior career*
Years	Team	Apps	(Gls)
2004–2006	São Paulo FC		
2007–2008	São Caetano Futsal		
2009–2013	Shriker Osaka		
2013– 2022	Pescadola Machida		

International career
2016–	Japan		
- * Club domestic league appearances and goals

Higor Pires (In Japanese : ピレス イゴール, born 7 July 1980) is a professional futsal player. He was born in Brazil and became a Japanese citizen in 2016. He plays for Bardral Urayasu and the Japanese national futsal team.

== Career ==
On 7 July 1980, he was born in São Paulo, Brazil. He started playing futsal when he was six years old. In 2004, he debuted from São Paulo FC. In 2007, he moved to São Caetano Futsal.

In 2009, he moved to Shriker Osaka in F.League in Japan. In 2009, Shriker Osaka won the All Japan Futsal Championship (Puma Cup), he was selected Most Valuable Player (MVP). In 2009–10 season, he was selected in F.League Most Valuable Player (MVP) and F.League Best 5. In 2011–12 season, he was selected in F.League Best 5 again.

In 2013, he moved to Pescadola Machida. On 30 November 2014, he broke his left little phalanx in the game against Espolada Hokkaido. In 2013–14 season, he was selected in F.League Best 5 (3rd title). In 2014–15 season, he was selected in F.League Best 5 (4th title). In 2015–16 season, he was selected in F.League Best 5 (5th title).

Before 2015–16 season, he became the captain of Pescadora Machida. On 22 January 2016, he became a Japanese citizen. In April 2016, he selected in Japanese national futsal team for the first time. In 2016–17 season, he was selected in F.League Best 5 (6th title). In 2017–18 season, he was selected in F.League Best 5 (7th title).

In February 2018, he participated in the 2018 AFC Futsal Championship. Japan lost to the Iran in the final. In 2018–19 season, he was selected in F.League Best 5 (8th title).

== Title ==
Shriker Osaka

- All Japan Futsal Championship (2) : 2009, 2011
- F.League Ocean Cup (1) : 2009

Individual

- F.League Best 5 (8) : 2009–10, 2011–12, 2013–14, 2014–15, 2015–16, 2016–17, 2017–18, 2018-19
- F.League MVP (1) : 2009-10
- All Japan Futsal Championship MVP (1) : 2009
