= F.League =

- Founded: 2007; 19 years ago
- Country: Japan
- Confederation: AFC
- Number of clubs: 12
- Level on pyramid: 1
- Domestic cup(s): All Japan Futsal Championship; F.League Ocean Cup
- International cup: AFC Futsal Club Championship
- Current champions: Nagoya Oceans (17th title) (2025–26)
- Most championships: Nagoya Oceans (17 titles)
- Website: www.fleague.jp
- Current: 2026–27 F.League

The F. League (in Japanese: F・リーグ, officially 日本フットサルリーグ, Nihon Futtosaru Rīgu) is the top league for Futsal in Japan. The winning team obtains the participation right to the AFC Futsal Club Championship.

== History ==
The league was formed in 2007 as a complement for the elimination tournament, which groups regional futsal champions into a final elimination phase.

The league operates on a closed league model combined with promotion and relegation system that are only done within the league. The clubs are thus expansion teams. Fuchu Athletic F.C. and Espolada Hokkaido became the first expansion teams in 2009, which increased the number of clubs from 8 to 10. Since 2024, the league consists of 21 teams divided by two divisions based on the performance of the teams – 12 in Division 1 and 9 in Division 2.

In F. League play, the clubs battle each other three times: once at home, once away and once in a neutral venue (generally Yoyogi National Gymnasium in Tokyo). The season runs from August to February.

An elimination league cup, the Ocean Cup is played every season by the 12 F.League teams.

== 2022–23 season ==
=== Participating clubs ===
==== Division 1 ====
Team	City/Area	Ground	Founded
Bardral Urayasu	Urayasu, Chiba	Urayasu General Gymnasium	1998
Boaluz Nagano	Nagano, Nagano	White Ring	2018
Borkbullet Kitakyushu	Kitakyushu, Fukuoka	Kitakyushu City General Gymnasium	2018
Espolada Hokkaido	Sapporo, Hokkaido	Hokkaido Prefectural Sports Center	2008
Fugador Sumida	Sumida, Tokyo	Sumida City Gymnasium	2001
Nagoya Oceans	Nagoya, Aichi	Takeda Teva Ocean Arena	2006
Pescadola Machida	Machida, Tokyo	Machida Municipal General Gymnasium	1999
Shonan Bellmare	Hiratsuka, Kanagawa	Odawara Arena	2007
Shriker Osaka	Osaka, Osaka	Osaka Municipal Central Gymnasium	2002
Tachikawa Athletic	Fuchū, Tokyo	Fuchu Sports Center	2000
Vasagey Oita	Oita, Oita	Oozu Sports Park	2003
YSCC Yokohama	Yokohama, Kanagawa	Yokohama City Hiranuma Memorial Gymnasium	2018

==== Division 2 ====
Team	City/Area	Ground	Founded
Agleymina Hamamatsu	Hamamatsu, Shizuoka	Hamamatsu Arena	1996
Deução Kobe	Kobe, Hyogo	Kobe Green Arena	2007
Hiroshima F DO	Hiroshima, Hiroshima	Hiroshima City Asakita-ku Sports Center	2018
Ligarevia Katsushika	Katsushika, Tokyo	Katsushika Ward Mizumoto Comprehensive Sports Center Gymnasium	2022
Malva Mito	Mito, Ibaraki	Adastria Mito Arena	1996
Porseid Hamada	Hamada, Shimane	Shimane Prefectural Gymnasium	2018
Shinagawa City Futsal Club	Shinagawa, Tokyo	Shinagawa Municipal General Gymnasium	2018
Vincedor Hakusan	Hakusan, Ishikawa	Matto General Sports Park Gymnasium	2018
Voscuore Sendai	Sendai, Miyagi	Sendai Gymnasium	2012

=== Withdrawing clubs ===
Team	City/Area	Ground	Founded	Withdraw
F.League selection	Nagoya, Aichi	Takeda Teva Ocean Arena	2018	2019–20
Stellamigo Iwate Hanamaki	Hanamaki, Iwate	Hanamaki Gymnasium Center	2007	2011–12

== Statistics ==
=== Champions ===
Seasons	Winner	Runner-up	Third place
2007–08	Nagoya Oceans	Bardral Urayasu	Deução Kobe
2008–09	Nagoya Oceans	Bardral Urayasu	Deução Kobe
2009–10	Nagoya Oceans	Pescadola Machida	Shriker Osaka
2010–11	Nagoya Oceans	Deução Kobe	Vasagey Oita
2011–12	Nagoya Oceans	Shriker Osaka	Deução Kobe
2012–13	Nagoya Oceans	Shriker Osaka	Fuchu Athletic
2013–14	Nagoya Oceans	Shriker Osaka	Vasagey Oita
2014–15	Nagoya Oceans	Shriker Osaka	Bardral Urayasu
2015–16	Nagoya Oceans	Fuchu Athletic	Shriker Osaka
2016–17	Shriker Osaka	Pescadola Machida	Nagoya Oceans
2017–18	Nagoya Oceans	Pescadola Machida	Shonan Bellmare
2018–19	Nagoya Oceans	Shriker Osaka	Tachikawa Fuchu Athletic
2019–20	Nagoya Oceans	Vasagey Oita	Pescadola Machida
2020–21	Nagoya Oceans	Vasagey Oita	Pescadola Machida
2021–22	Nagoya Oceans	Shonan Bellmare	Pescadola Machida
2022–23	Nagoya Oceans	Tachikawa Athletic	Bardral Urayasu
2023–24	Nagoya Oceans	Pescadola Machida	Shriker Osaka
2024–25	Bardral Urayasu	Shinagawa City	Nagoya Oceans
2025–26	Nagoya Oceans	Shinagawa City	Pescadola Machida

=== Most Valuable Player (MVP) ===
Seasons	Player
2007–08	(Japan) Kaoru Morioka (Nagoya Oceans)
2008–09	(Japan) Wataru Kitahara (Nagoya Oceans)
2009–10	(Brazil) Higor Pires (Shriker Osaka)
2010–11	(Portugal) Ricardinho (Nagoya Oceans)
2011–12	(Japan) Kaoru Morioka (Nagoya Oceans)
2012–13	(Portugal) Ricardinho (Nagoya Oceans)
2013–14	(Japan) Kaoru Morioka (Nagoya Oceans)
2014–15	(Japan) Kaoru Morioka (Nagoya Oceans)
2015–16	(Brazil) Vinicius Crepaldi (Shriker Osaka)
2016–17	(Japan) Nobuya Osodo (Shriker Osaka)
2017–18	(Brazil) Rafa Santos (Nagoya Oceans)
2018–19	(Japan) Tomoki Yoshikawa (Nagoya Oceans)
2019–20	(Brazil) Pepita (Nagoya Oceans)
2020–21	(Brazil) Pepita (Nagoya Oceans)
2021–22	(Brazil) Rodrigo (Shonan Bellmare)
2022–23	(Spain) Andresito (Nagoya Oceans)
2023–24	(Brazil) Giovanni (Pescadola Machida)
2024–25	(Brazil) Higor Pires (Bardral Urayasu)
2025–26	(Japan) Kazuya Shimizu (Nagoya Oceans)

== See also ==
- Sport in Japan
  - Futsal in Japan
- Japan Football Association (JFA)
- Futsal Championship (Futsal National Open Cup)
- F.League Ocean Cup (Futsal League Cup)
- Women's F.League (Women's Futsal League)

Futsal national teams
Men's

- Japan national futsal team
- Japan national under-20 futsal team

Women's

- Japan women's national futsal team
