= Daisuke Kikuchi =

Japanese footballer

Daisuke Kikuchi 菊池 大介
Personal information
- Full name: Daisuke Kikuchi
- Date of birth: 12 April 1991 (age 35)
- Place of birth: Yokohama, Kanagawa, Japan
- Height: 1.72 m (5 ft 8 in)
- Position: Midfielder

Youth career
- 2004–2006: Saku Shiritsu Asama; Junior High School
- 2007: Shonan Bellmare

Senior career*
Years	Team	Apps	(Gls)
2007–2016	Shonan Bellmare	199	(25)
2010	→ Thespa Kusatsu (loan)	27	(4)
2017–2018	Urawa Red Diamonds	17	(0)
2019–2021	Kashiwa Reysol	23	(0)
2020	→ Avispa Fukuoka (loan)	16	(0)
2021	→ Tochigi SC (loan)	21	(0)
2022	FC Gifu	20	(2)
2023–2024	Shonan Bellmare (Futsal)		

International career
2009	Japan U-19	7	(1)
Medal record
Urawa Red Diamonds
Winner	AFC Champions League	2017
Winner	Emperor's Cup	2018
- * Club domestic league appearances and goals

Daisuke Kikuchi (菊池 大介, Kikuchi Daisuke; born April 12, 1991) is a Japanese former footballer who played as a midfielder and former futsal player.

Primarily known for his time at Shonan Bellmare, Kikuchi has played in over 350 league matches in the J League system. He was the youngest player to appear and score in the J2 League.

== Career ==
On 7 July 2007, Kikuchi became the youngest player to appear in the J2 League, and in 2008, he became the youngest player to score in the J2 League. After only playing in 9 games during the 2009 season, he moved on loan to Thespa Kusatsu. Kikuchi was part of the 2014 Shonan Bellmare team that was promoted to the J1 League.

On 28 December 2016, Kikuchi was announced at Urawa Red Diamonds on a permanent transfer. He was part of the Urawa Reds team that took part in the 2017 FIFA Club World Cup.

On 5 January 2019, Kikuchi was announced at Kashiwa Reysol on a permanent transfer.

On 8 January 2020, Kikuchi was announced at Avispa Fukuoka on a loan deal.

On 12 January 2021, Kikuchi was announced at Tochigi SC on a one year loan.

On 14 January 2022, Kikuchi was announced at FC Gifu on a permanent transfer. On 17 November 2022, the club announced they would not be extending his contract for the 2023 season.

On 19 February 2023, Kikuchi announced that he was switching to futsal, and joining Shonan Bellmare (Futsal) from FC Gifu.

On 31 December 2024, Kikuchi announced his retirement from futsal at the end of the 2024–25 season.

== Career statistics ==
Updated to end of 2018 season.

Club performance			League		Cup		League Cup		Continental		Other		Total	
Season	Club	League	Apps	Goals	Apps	Goals	Apps	Goals	Apps	Goals	Apps	Goals	Apps	Goals
Japan			League		Emperor's Cup		J. League Cup		AFC		Other^{1}		Total	
2007	Shonan Bellmare	J2 League	1	0	0	0	–		–		–		1	0
2008	Shonan Bellmare	J2 League	14	2	1	0	–		–		–		15	2
2009	Shonan Bellmare	J2 League	6	1	1	0	–		–		–		7	1
2010	Thespa Kusatsu	J2 League	27	4	0	0	–		–		–		27	4
2011	Shonan Bellmare	J2 League	34	2	3	0	–		–		–		37	2
2012	Shonan Bellmare	J2 League	39	7	1	0	–		–		–		40	7
2013	Shonan Bellmare	J1 League	30	2	0	0	4	1	–		–		34	3
2014	Shonan Bellmare	J2 League	41	8	1	0	–		–		–		42	8
2015	Shonan Bellmare	J1 League	34	3	1	0	2	0	–		–		37	3
2016	Shonan Bellmare	J1 League	32	3	3	0	5	0	–		–		40	3
2017	Urawa Red Diamonds	J1 League	8	0	2	0	1	0	3	0	2	0	17	3
2018	Urawa Red Diamonds	J1 League	9	0	1	0	6	0	–		–		16	0
Career total			243	29	14	0	18	1	3	0	2	0	280	30

^{1}Includes Japanese Super Cup and FIFA Club World Cup.

== National Team career ==
As of 6 October 2010

=== Appearances in major competitions ===
Team	Competition	Category	Appearances		Goals	Team record
Team	Competition	Category	Start	Sub	Goals	Team record
Japan	2010 AFC U-19 Championship qualification	U-18	4	1	1	Qualified
Japan	2010 AFC U-19 Championship	U-19	2	0	0	Quarter-finals
