= Kaoru Morioka =

Peruvian-born Japanese futsal player (born 1979)

Personal information
- Full name: Kaoru Morioka
- Date of birth: 7 April 1979 (age 47)
- Place of birth: Lima, Peru
- Height: 1.75 m (5 ft 9 in)
- Position: Pivot

Team information
- Current team: O Parrulo FS

Senior career*
Years	Team	Apps	(Gls)
2007–2016	Nagoya Oceans	233	(229)
2016	Shenzhen Nanling Tielang		
2016–2020	Pescadola Machida		
2018	→ Bintang Timur Surabaya (loan)	10	(5)
2020–	O Parrulo FS		

International career
2012 –	Japan		
- * Club domestic league appearances and goals

Kaoru Morioka (森岡薫, Morioka Kaoru) is a Peruvian-born Japanese futsal player. He plays for O Parrulo FS and Japanese national futsal team.

== Career ==
Morioka was born in Lima, Peru. In his childhood, he moved to Japan with his family. He graduated from Narita City Tomisato Elementary School and Funabashi City Katsushika Junior High School.

He participated in the 2012 FIFA Futsal World Cup, where he scored four goals, the most of anyone on the Japanese team.

In 2014, Morioka participated in the 2014 AFC Futsal Championship. Japan beat Iran in the final. In 2018, he participated in the 2018 AFC Futsal Championship. Japan was defeated by Iran in the final.

== Titles ==
=== Club ===
- F. League: 8

Nagoya Oceans: 2007-08, 2008-09, 2009–10, 2010-11, 2011-12, 2012–13, 2013-14, 2014-15

- F.League Ocean Cup: 5

Nagoya Oceans: 2009-10, 2010-11, 2011–12, 2012-13, 2013-14

- All Japan Futsal Championship: 4

Nagoya Oceans: 2007, 2013, 2014, 2015

- AFC Futsal Club Championship: 2

Nagoya Oceans: 2011, 2014

=== Japan National Team ===
- AFC Futsal Championship: 1

2014

=== Individual ===
- F. League MVP: 4

2007-08, 2011-12, 2013-14, 2014-15

- F. League Best 5: 6

2007-08, 2011-12, 2013-14, 2014-15, 2015-16, 2017-18

- F. League Top Scorer: 4

2011-12, 2012-13, 2013-14, 2014-15

- AFC Futsal Club Championship MVP: 1

2014

- AFC Futsal Club Championship Top Scorer: 2

2013, 2014

Sporting positions
Preceded by (Iran) Ahmad Esmaeilpour	AFC Futsal Club Championship Top Scorers; 2013 (8 Goals); 2014 (5 Goals)	Succeeded by (Iran) Vahid Shamsaei
Preceded by (Thailand) Suphawut Thueanklang	AFC Futsal Club Championship MVP; 2014	Succeeded by (Iran) Vahid Shamsaei
