= Shonan Bellmare (futsal) =

Japanese futsal club

Shonan Bellmare Futsal Club 湘南ベルマーレ
- Full name: Shonan Bellmare Futsal Club
- Founded: 2007; 18 years ago
- Ground: Odawara Arena
- League: F. League
- Website: www.bellmare.co.jp
Home colours	Away colours

Shonan Bellmare Futsal Club (湘南ベルマーレ, Shōnan Berumāre) is a Japanese professional futsal club, currently playing in the F. League Division 1. The team is located in Hiratsuka, in the west of Kanagawa Prefecture, part of the Greater Tokyo Area. Their main ground is Odawara Arena.

== History ==
- 2007 – Founded
- 2007-08 F. League – 5th
- 2008-09 F. League – 7th
- 2009-10 F. League – 8th
- 2010-11 F. League – 8th
- 2011-12 F. League – 8th
- 2012-13 F. League – 9th
- 2013-14 F. League – 9th
- 2014-15 F. League – 10th
- 2015-16 F. League – 10th
- 2016-17 F. League – 10th
- 2017-18 F. League – 3rd
- 2018-19 F. League Division 1 – 4th

== See also ==
- Shonan Bellmare
