= 2009–10 F.League =

F. League
- Season: 2009–10
- AFC Futsal Club Champ.: Nagoya Oceans

The 2009–10 season of the F. League is the 3rd season of top-tier futsal in Japan.

== Teams ==
=== Stadia and locations ===
Location of teams in F League 2009–10

Team	Location	Stadium	Capacity
Espolada Hokkaido	Sapporo, Hokkaido		
StellAmigo Iwate Hanamaki	Hanamaki, Iwate		
Bardral Urayasu	Urayasu, Chiba		
Fuchu Athletic F.C.	Fuchu, Tokyo		
Pescadola Machida	Machida, Tokyo		
Shonan Bellmare	Odawara, Kanagawa		
Nagoya Oceans	Nagoya, Aichi		
Shriker Osaka	Osaka, Osaka		
Deução Kobe	Kobe, Hyogo		
Vasagey Oita	Oita, Oita		

Yoyogi National Gymnasium in Tokyo is used for the "neutral tiebreaker" fixture.

== League table ==
Results are as follows:

P	Team	Pts	Pld	W	D	L	GF	GA	GD	Qualification or relegation
1	Nagoya Oceans	69	27	22	3	2	108	58	+50	AFC Futsal Club Champ.
2	ASV Pescadola Machida	51	27	15	6	6	98	84	+14	
3	Shriker Osaka	47	27	14	5	8	68	50	+18	
4	Espolada Hokkaido	40	27	12	4	11	80	81	-1	
5	Vasagey Oita	39	27	10	9	8	62	61	+1	
6	Bardral Urayasu	37	27	10	7	10	62	64	-2	
7	Deucao Kobe	34	27	8	10	9	66	63	+3	
8	Shonan Bellmare	25	27	6	7	14	76	88	-12	
9	StellAmigo Iwate Hanamaki	17	27	4	5	18	52	86	-34	
10	Tokyo Fuchu Athletic	16	27	4	4	19	51	88	-37	

Source: F. League

== See also ==
- F. League
- Futsal in Japan
