= Takumi Nagasawa =

Japanese footballer

Personal information
- Date of birth: 27 May 1992 (age 34)
- Place of birth: Tokyo, Japan
- Height: 1.86 m (6 ft 1 in)
- Position: Midfielder

Team information
- Current team: YSCC Yokohama
- Number: 13

Youth career
- Tokyo Verdy
- Komazawa University HS
- –2014: Nippon Sport Science University

Senior career*
Years	Team	Apps	(Gls)
2015–2017	BCV Glesch-Paffendorf	13	(1)
2018–	YSCC Yokohama	15	(0)
- * Club domestic league appearances and goals as of 17:04, 10 November 2020 (UTC)

Takumi Nagasawa (長澤 卓己, Nagasawa Takumi; born 27 May 1992) is a Japanese footballer who plays as a midfielder for YSCC Yokohama.

== Career statistics ==
As of 10 November 2020

Appearances and goals by club, season and competition
Club	Season	League			National cup		League cup		Other		Total	
Club	Season	Division	Apps	Goals	Apps	Goals	Apps	Goals	Apps	Goals	Apps	Goals
BCV Glesch-Paffendorf	2015–16	Landesliga Mittelrhein Staffel 2	13	1	0	0	–		0	0	13	1
YSCC Yokohama	2018	J3 League	0	0	0	0	–		0	0	0	0
YSCC Yokohama	2019	J3 League	10	0	0	0	–		0	0	10	0
YSCC Yokohama	2020	J3 League	5	0	0	0	–		0	0	5	0
YSCC Yokohama	Total		15	0	0	0	0	0	0	0	15	0
Career total			28	1	0	0	0	0	0	0	28	1
