= Voscuore Sendai =

Japanese futsal club

Voscuore Sendai ヴォスクオーレ仙台
- Full name: Voscuore Sendai
- Founded: 2012; 2022 (Refounded)
- Dissolved: 2021
- Ground: Sendai Gymnasium
- League: F. League Division 2
- 2018-19: Division 1, 9th
Home colours	Away colours

Voscuore Sendai (ヴォスクオーレ仙台) was a Japanese futsal club, played in the F. League. The team was located in Sendai, Miyagi Prefecture, Japan. Their main arena was Sendai Gymnasium.

== Chronicle ==
Chronicle of Voscuore Sendai

- 2012 - Founded
- 2014–2015 - 11th F. League
- 2015–2016 - 12th F. League
- 2016–2017 - 12th F. League
- 2017–2018 - 9th F. League
- 2018–2019 - 9th F. League Division 1
- 2022 - Refounded
