= Agleymina Hamamatsu =

Japanese futsal club

Agleymina Hamamatsu アグレミーナ浜松
- Full name: Agleymina Hamamatsu
- Founded: 1996; 29 years ago
- Ground: Hamamatsu Arena
- Capacity: 13,000
- League: F. League
Home colours	Away colours

Agleymina Hamamatsu (アグレミーナ浜松) is a Japanese futsal club, currently playing in the F. League Division 2, the league second tier. The team is located in Hamamatsu city, Shizuoka Prefecture, Japan. Their home ground is Hamamatsu Arena.

== Chronicle ==
Chronicle of Agleymina Hamamatsu

- 1996 - Founded
- 2012–2013 - 10th F. League
- 2013–2014 - 10th F. League
- 2014–2015 - 12th F. League
- 2015–2016 - 11th F. League
- 2016–2017 - 11th F. League
- 2017–2018 - 8th F. League
- 2018–2019 - 12th F. League Division 1 (relegated)
- 2019–2020 - F. League Division 2

== Trophies ==
=== Regional ===
- Tokai Regional League: 1

2006
