= Hamamatsu Arena =

Arena in Hamamatsu, Shizuoka, Japan

Coordinates: 34°43′04″N 137°46′00″E

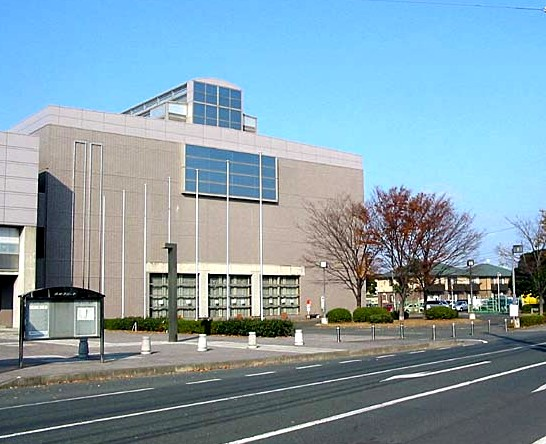
- Interactive map of Hamamatsu Arena
- Location: 808-1, Wadachou, Chūō-ku, Hamamatsu
- Owner: City of Hamamatsu
- Operator: Hamamatsu Sports Association
- Capacity: 8,000

Construction
- Opened: 1990

Tenants
- Hamamatsu Higashimikawa Phoenix (bj league); Agleymina Hamamatsu

Hamamatsu Arena (浜松アリーナ, Hamamatsu Arīna) is a multipurpose indoor sporting arena located in Hamamatsu, Shizuoka, Japan. It is a 15-minute walk from Tenryūgawa Station on the Tōkaidō Main Line railway, or a 10-minute drive from the Hamamatsu Interchange on the Tōmei Expressway.

With a capacity for seating 8,000 spectators, Hamamatsu Arena was opened in 1990. It has been used for numerous music concerts and sporting events, notably the Group C games for the 2006 FIBA World Championship. Hamamatsu Arena was the home stadium for the Hamamatsu Higashimikawa Phoenix bj league professional basketball team. Further, it was one of the host arenas for the official 2010 Women's Volleyball World Championship.

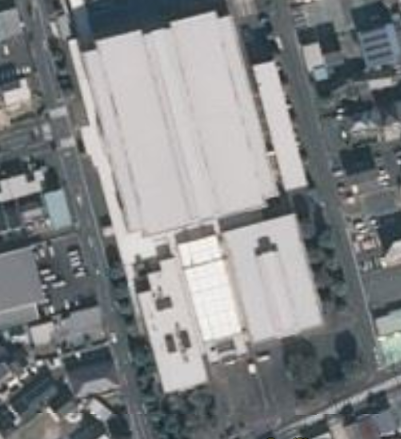
Satellite view
