= Katawut Hankampa =

Thai futsal player

Personal information
- Full name: Katawut Hankampa
- Date of birth: 27 May 1992 (age 34)
- Place of birth: Ranong, Thailand
- Height: 1.72 m (5 ft 7 1/2 in)
- Position: Goalkeeper

Team information
- Current team: Thammasat Stallion
- Number: 12

Youth career
- 2005–2007: Phichai Rattanakhan School
- 2008–2010: Suksanari School

Senior career*
Years	Team	Apps	(Gls)
2011–2013	Bangkok BTS	39	(0)
2014–2021	Chonburi Bluewave	175	(4)
2021–2023	Bangkok BTS	40	(0)
2024-	Thammasat Stallion	0	(0)

International career
2014–	Thailand Futsal	42	(0)
Medal record
Thailand national football team
Asian Championship
Silver medal – second place	AFC Futsal Championship 2024	Futsal
- * Club domestic league appearances and goals

Katawut Hankampa (Thai คฑาวุธ หาญคำภา), is a Thai futsal goalkeeper, and a member of Thailand national futsal team. He plays for Bangkok BTS in Futsal Thailand League.

== Honours ==
Thailand

- AFC Futsal Asian Cup Runners-up: 2024
