= Bardral Urayasu =

Japanese futsal club

Bardral Urayasu バルドラール浦安
- Full name: Bardral Urayasu Futbol Sala
- Founded: 1998; 28 years ago
- Ground: Urayasu General Gymnasium
- Capacity: 1,798
- Head coach (PRIMERO): Yusuke Komiyama
- League: F. League
- 2021-22 F.League D1: 7th
Home colours	Away colours

Bardral Urayasu (バルドラール浦安) is a Japanese professional futsal club, currently playing in the F. League Division 1. The team is located in Urayasu, in the Chiba Prefecture, Japan. Their home ground is Urayasu General Gymnasium.

== Chronicle ==
Chronicle of Bardral Urayasu

- 1998 – Founded
- 2007–2008 – 2nd F. League – Wins the All Japan Futsal Championship
- 2008–2009 – 2nd F. League
- 2009–2010 – 6th F. League
- 2010–2011 – 6th F. League
- 2011–2012 – 5th F. League
- 2012–2013 – 4th F. League
- 2013–2014 – 3rd F. League
- 2014–2015 – 3rd F. League
- 2015–2016 – 8th F. League
- 2016–2017 – 6th F. League
- 2017–2018 – 7th F. League
- 2018–2019 – 10th F. League Division 1
- 2019–2020 – 8th F. League Division 1
- 2020–2021 – 8th F. League Division 1
- 2021–2022 – 7th F. League Division 1

== Current squads ==
=== Bardral Urayasu PRIMERO ===
As of 27 June 2022.

Note: Flags indicate national team as defined under FIFA eligibility rules; some limited exceptions apply. Players may hold more than one non-FIFA nationality.

No.	Pos.	Nation	Player
1	GK	BRA	Higor Pires
12	GK	JPN	Yusuke Onodera
77	GK	JPN	Katsunori Fukushige
4	FP	JPN	Takashi Mikaza
5	FP	JPN	Taiki Okada
6	FP	JPN	Akihiro Oshima
7	FP	JPN	Takumi Nagasaka
8	FP	JPN	Naoki Sanada
9	FP	BRA	Garrincha
10	FP	JPN	Ryuma Kato

No.	Pos.	Nation	Player
11	FP	BRA	Diduda
14	FP	JPN	Kentaro Ishida
16	FP	JPN	Tatsuya Asano
17	FP	JPN	Keigo Yoshida
19	FP	JPN	Iori Uno ^{Type 2}
23	FP	JPN	Hidefumi Nunomiya
36	FP	JPN	Ryogo Sotobayashi ^{Type 2}
37	FP	JPN	Haruki Ito ^{Type 2}
38	FP	JPN	Keigo Shibayama
41	FP	JPN	Shuya Higashide

=== Bardral Urayasu SEGUNDO ===
As of 27 June 2022.

Note: Flags indicate national team as defined under FIFA eligibility rules; some limited exceptions apply. Players may hold more than one non-FIFA nationality.

No.	Pos.	Nation	Player
1	GK	JPN	Yunosuke Hori
2	GK	JPN	Shin Inano
18	GK	JPN	Takuya Kikuchi
3	FP	JPN	Genki Onda
4	FP	JPN	Masahiro Hirai
5	FP	JPN	Shinya Someno
6	FP	JPN	Ryoto Iguchi
8	FP	JPN	Takashi Yamazaki
9	FP	JPN	Matthew Ashwell
10	FP	JPN	Soshi Ogata
11	FP	JPN	Shota Suzuki

No.	Pos.	Nation	Player
12	FP	JPN	Jin Kusano
13	FP	JPN	Koki Tanaka
14	FP	JPN	Yoshimasa Anzai
15	FP	JPN	Takumi Sasaki
16	FP	JPN	Ryogo Sotobayashi
17	FP	JPN	Haruki Ito
19	FP	JPN	Ryosuke Sora
20	FP	JPN	Ryota Yaguchi
21	FP	JPN	Asuki Wada
22	FP	JPN	Yuta Ito

=== Bardral Urayasu TERCERO ===
As of 27 June 2022.

Note: Flags indicate national team as defined under FIFA eligibility rules; some limited exceptions apply. Players may hold more than one non-FIFA nationality.

No.	Pos.	Nation	Player
25	FP	JPN	Riku Kanazawa
26	FP	JPN	Ryoga Anezaki
27	FP	JPN	Kota Sato
29	FP	JPN	Ryuku Muto
30	FP	JPN	Sasuke Tokutake
31	FP	JPN	Haruki Onda
33	FP	JPN	Hiroto Tsuruta
34	FP	JPN	Kojiro Ishibashi
35	FP	JPN	Ryunosuke Mikata

No.	Pos.	Nation	Player
36	FP	JPN	Shuto Horii
37	FP	JPN	Rikuto Uematsu
38	FP	JPN	Haruto Ogawa
39	FP	JPN	Kei Izawa
40	FP	JPN	Kyohei Yamagishi
44	FP	JPN	Shunsuke Yamaguchi
45	FP	JPN	Tsubasa Sakuraba
46	FP	JPN	Takuto Hara

== Trophies ==
- All Japan Futsal Championship : 2
  - Winners: 2006, 2008
