= Fugador Sumida =

Japanese futsal club

Fugador Sumida フウガドールすみだ
- Full name: Fugador Sumida Futsal Club
- Founded: 2001; 24 years ago
- Ground: Sumida City Gymnasium
- Capacity: 2,500
- Manager: Takashi Ogikubo
- League: F. League Division 1
- 2021–22: 8th of 12
Home colours	Away colours

Fugador Sumida (フウガドールすみだ, Fuugadōru Sumida) is a Japanese professional futsal club, currently playing in the F. League Division 1. The team is located in Sumida, Tokyo, Japan. Their main ground is Sumida City Gymnasium.

== History ==
Chronicle of Fugador Sumida

- 2001 – Founded as Botswana until 2006
- 2007 – Change name to Fuuga Meguro until 2008
- 2009 – Change name again to Fuuga Tokyo until 2011
- 2012 – Change name again to Fuuga Sumida until 2013
- 2014-2015 – Change name again to Fugador Sumida
- 2014-2015 – 6th F.League
- 2015-2016 – 3rd F.League
- 2016-2017 – 4th F.League
- 2017-2018 – 4th F.League
- 2018-2019 – 7th F.League Division 1
- 2019-2020 – 3rd F.League Division 1
- 2020-2021 – 6th F.League Division 1
- 2021-2022 – 8th F.League Division 1

== Trophies ==
- All Japan Futsal Championship:
  - Winners: 2009, 2023

== Sources ==
- Official website (in Japanese)
- F. League team page (in Japanese)
