= Deução Kobe =

Japanese futsal club

Deução Kobe デウソン神戸
- Full name: Deução Kobe
- Nickname: Deução
- Founded: 1993; 33 years ago
- Ground: Kobe Green Arena
- Capacity: 4,852
- League: F. League
Home colours	Away colours

Deução Kobe (デウソン神戸) is a Japanese futsal club, currently playing in the F. League Division 2, the league second tier. The team is located in Kobe, Hyogo Prefecture, Japan. Their home ground is Kobe Green Arena.

== Chronicle ==
Chronicle of Deução Kobe

- 1993 - Founded
- 2007–2008 - 3rd F. League
- 2008–2009 - 3rd F. League
- 2009–2010 - 7th F. League
- 2010–2011 - 2nd F. League
- 2011–2012 - 3rd F. League
- 2012–2013 - 5th F. League
- 2013–2014 - 4th F. League
- 2014–2015 - 9th F. League
- 2015–2016 - 9th F. League
- 2016–2017 - 7th F. League
- 2017–2018 - 11th F. League (relegated)
- 2018–2019 - 7th F. League Division 2

== Trophies ==
none
