= Shriker Osaka =

Japanese futsal club

Shriker Osaka シュライカー大阪
- Full name: Shriker Osaka
- Founded: 2002; 23 years ago
- Ground: Osaka Municipal Central Gymnasium
- Capacity: 10,000
- Head coach: Kenichiro Kogure
- League: F. League
Home colours	Away colours

Shriker Osaka (シュライカー大阪, Shuraikā Ōsaka) is a Japanese professional futsal club, currently playing in the F. League Division 1. The team is located in Osaka, Japan. Their main arena is Osaka Municipal Central Gymnasium, but they also play at the Kishiwada General Gymnasium and at the Sumiyoshi Sports Center.

The team's name is a portmanteau of "shrike", the Osaka prefectural bird, and "striker".

== History ==
History of Shriker Osaka

- 2002 – Founded
- 2007–2008 – 7th F. League – Wins the F.League Ocean Cup
- 2008–2009 – 4th F. League – Wins the F.League Ocean Cup
- 2009–2010 – 3rd F. League – Wins the All Japan Futsal Championship
- 2010–2011 – 7th F. League
- 2011–2012 – 2nd F. League – Wins the All Japan Futsal Championship
- 2012–2013 – 2nd F. League
- 2013–2014 – 4th F. League
- 2014–2015 - 5th F. League
- 2015–2016 – 4th F. League
- 2016–2017 – 1st F. League
- 2017–2018 – 5th F. League
- 2018–2019 - 2nd F. League Division 1

== Trophies and records ==
- F. League:
  - Winners: 2016-17
- All Japan Futsal Championship:
  - Winners: 2010, 2012, 2017
- F.League Ocean Cup:
  - Winners: 2008, 2009
  - Runners up: 2010, 2011

=== F League ===
Year	League	PTS	PLD	W	D	L	GF	GA	GD	Place
2007–08	F League	19	21	5	4	12	48	74	−26	7th
2008–09	F League	30	21	9	3	9	63	60	+3	4th
2009–10	F League	47	27	14	5	8	68	50	+18	3rd
2010–11	F League	46	27	14	4	9	70	67	+3	5th
2011–12	F League	60	27	18	6	3	78	43	+35	2nd
Total			123	60	22	41	327	294	+33	

== Mascot ==
The official team mascot is Shrappy (シュラッピー), a shrike, in line with the team's name. Its name was decided through fan submissions of potential mascot names.
