= Tachikawa Athletic FC =

Japanese futsal club

Tachikawa Athletic FC 立川アスレティック
- Full name: Tachikawa Athletic Futsal Club
- Founded: 2000; 25 years ago
- Ground: Arena Tachikawa Tachihi
- Capacity: 3,000
- Manager: Ricardo Higa
- League: F. League
- 2021–22: 5th
Home colours	Away colours

Tachikawa Athletic FC (立川アスレティックFC, Tachikawa Asuretikku Efushi) Japanese formerly Tachikawa Fuchu Athletic FC (立川府中アスレティックFC, Tachikawa Fuchū Asuretikku Efushi) is a professional futsal club, currently playing in the F. League Division 1. The team is located between Tachikawa and Fuchu, Japan. Their main ground is Arena Tachikawa Tachihi. The team changed name to Tachikawa Athletic FC in 2022–23 season.

== Chronicle ==
Chronicle of Tachikawa Fuchu Athletic F.C. (now Tachikawa Athletic FC)

- 2000 – Founded
- 2009–2010 – 10th F.League
- 2010–2011 – 4th F.League
- 2011–2012 – 6th F.League
- 2012–2013 – 3rd F.League
- 2013–2014 – 7th F.League
- 2014–2015 – 7th F.League
- 2015–2016 – 5th F.League
- 2016–2017 – 5th F.League
- 2017–2018 – 6th F.League
- 2018–2019 – 3rd F.League Division 1
- 2019–2020 – 7th F.League Division 1
- 2020–2021 – 5th F.League Division 1
- 2021–2022 – 5th F.League Division 1
- 2022 - Renamed from Tachikawa Fuchu Athletic F.C. to Tachikawa Athletic FC

== Trophies ==
- F.League Ocean Cup:
  - Winners: 2015
