= Espolada Hokkaido =

Japanese futsal club

Espolada Hokkaido エスポラーダ北海道
- Full name: Espolada Hokkaido Futsal Club
- Nickname(s): Espolada
- Founded: 2008; 17 years ago
- Ground: Hokkaido Prefectural Sports Center
- Capacity: 8,000
- Head coach: Shingo Onodera
- League: F. League
Home colours	Away colours

Espolada Hokkaido (エスポラーダ北海道) is a Japanese professional futsal club, currently playing in the F. League Division 1. The team is located in Sapporo, Hokkaido.

== Arena ==
Espolada Hokkaido plays its home games mainly at the Hokkai Kitayell, but, as the team represents the entire Hokkaido Prefecture, also plays some home-games at the Asahikawa Taisetsu Arena, Otaru City Gymnasium, Hakodate Arena, Tomakomai City Gymnasium, Mikaho Gymnasium and Kushiro Kaze Arena.

== History ==
Chronicle of Espolada Hokkaido

- 2008 – Founded
- 2009–2010 – 4th F. League
- 2010–2011 – 7th F. League
- 2011–2012 – 9th F. League
- 2012–2013 – 6th F. League
- 2013–2014 – 8th F. League
- 2014–2015 – 4th F. League
- 2015–2016 – 6th F. League
- 2016–2017 – 9th F. League
- 2017–2018 – 10th F. League
- 2018–2019 – 11th F. League Division 1
