= Shinagawa City Futsal Club =

Japanese futsal club in Tokyo

Shinagawa City Futsal Club 品川シティフットサルクラブ
- Full name: Shinagawa City Futsal Club
- Nickname: Shinagawa City
- Founded: 2006; 20 years ago
- Chairman: Takashi Okuri
- Manager: Kosuke Okayama
- League: F. League Division 2

Shinagawa City Futsal Club (品川シティフットサルクラブ) is a Japanese futsal club. They play in the F.League Division 2, the league's second tier. The team is located in Shinagawa, Tokyo Prefecture, Japan.

== See also ==
- Japan Football Association (JFA)
