= Kobe Green Arena =

Arena in Kobe, Japan

Coordinates: 34.678224°N 135.074622°E

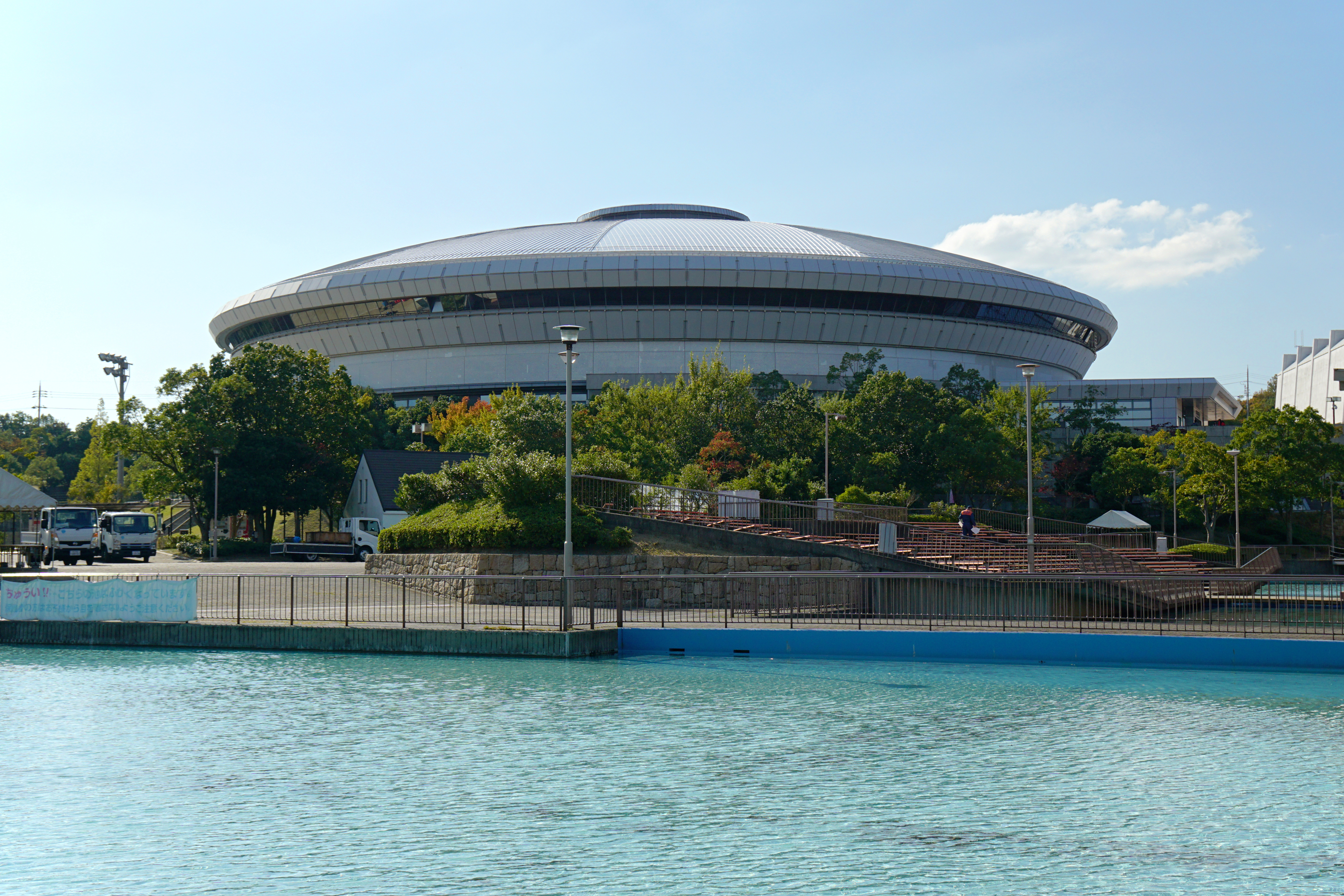
Kobe Green Arena

Kobe Green Arena is an indoor sporting arena located at the Kobe Sports Park in Kobe, Hyōgo Prefecture, Japan. The capacity of the arena is 6,000 people.

The arena was opened in July 1993. It hosted games of several global women's volleyball tournaments, including the official 2006 Women's Volleyball World Championship and also for the FIVB World Grand Prix 2008. Amongst others, the USA, Kazakhstan, Turkey and Japan played there.

== See also ==
- Kobe Sports Park Baseball Stadium
- Kobe Universiade Memorial Stadium
