= Pescadola Machida =

Japanese futsal club

Pescadola Machida ペスカドーラ町田
- Full name: Pescadola Machida Futsal Club
- Founded: 1999; 27 years ago
- Ground: Machida Municipal Gymnasium
- Capacity: 2,880
- League: F. League
Home colours	Away colours

Pescadola Machida (ペスカドーラ町田) is a Japanese professional futsal club, currently playing in the F. League. The team is located in Machida, Tokyo, Tokyo. Their main arena is Machida Municipal Gymnasium.

== Chronicle ==
Chronicle of Pescadola Machida

- 1999 – Founded
- 2007–2008 – 4th F.League
- 2008–2009 – 5th F.League
- 2009–2010 – 2nd F.League
- 2010–2011 – 9th F.League
- 2011–2012 – 7th F.League
- 2012–2013 – 8th F.League
- 2013–2014 – 5th F.League
- 2014–2015 – 8th F.League
- 2015–2016 – 4th F.League
- 2016–2017 – 3rd F.League
- 2017–2018 – 2nd F.League
- 2018–2019 – 5th F. League Division 1

== Trophies ==
- All Japan Futsal Championship : 2

2001, 2016
