= Vasagey Oita =

Japanese futsal club

Vasagey Oita バサジィ大分
- Full name: Vasagey Oita
- Nickname: Vasagey
- Founded: 2003; 23 years ago
- Ground: Oozu Sports Park
- Capacity: 2,000
- League: F. League
Home colours	Away colours

Vasagey Oita (バサジィ大分) is a Japanese professional futsal club, currently playing in the F. League Division 1. The team is located in Ōita, Ōita prefecture, Japan. Their home arena is Oozu Sports Park.

== History ==
Chronicle of Vasagey Oita

- 2003 - Founded
- 2007–2008 F.League - 6th
- 2008–2009 F.League - 6th
- 2009-10 F.League - 5th
- 2010-11 F.League - 3rd
- 2011-12 F.League - 4th
- 2012-13 F.League - 7th
- 2013-14 F.League - 2nd
- 2014-15 F.League - 2nd
- 2015-16 F.League – 7th
- 2016-17 F.League – 8th
- 2017-18 F.League – 12th
- 2018-19 F.League Division 1 - 6th
