= 2022–23 Iranian Futsal Super League =

Iranian Futsal Super League
- Season: 2022–23
- Champions: Mes Sungun
- Relegated: Moghavemat; Rokn Azin
- Matches: 84
- Goals: 473 (5.63 per match)
- Top goalscorer: Mahdi Javid (37 goals)

The 2022–23 Iranian Futsal Super League is the 24th season of the Iran Pro League and the 19th under the name Futsal Super League. Giti Pasand are the defending champions. The season will feature 12 teams from the 2021–22 Super League and two new teams promoted from the 2021–22 Iran Futsal's 1st Division.

== Teams ==
=== Stadiums and locations ===
Locations of clubs in 2022–23 Iranian Futsal Super League

Team	Location	Indoor stadium	Capacity	Past Season
Ana Sanat	Qom	Shahid Heidarian	2,000	10th
Crop	Alvand	Yadegar Imam	3,500	3rd
Farsh Ara	Mashhad	Shahid Beheshti	6,000	7th
Foolad	Zarand	Azad University	1,700	6th
Ghand Katrin	Amol	Payambar Azam	2,100	Replaced for Raga
Giti Pasand	Isfahan	Pirouzi	4,300	Champion
Gohar Zamin	Sirjan	Imam Ali	–	Promoted
Mes Sungun	Varzaqan	Shahid Poursharifi	6,000	2nd
Moghavemat	Karaj	Enghelab Eslami	2,500	4th
Rokn Azin	Mashhad	Shohadaye Taxirani	500	11th
Safir Gofteman	Tehran	Shahid Ghianouri	2,000	Replaced for Sepahan
Sanaye Poshtiban	Bandar Abbas	Fajr	4,000	Promoted
Sunich	Saveh	Fajr-e Felestin	2,500	5th
Zandi Beton	Kelardasht	Besat	–	9th

=== Personnel ===
Team	Manager	Captain
Ana Sanat	(Iran) Saeid Ghasemi	(Iran) Hashem Farajzadeh
Crop	(Iran) Reza Lak Aliabadi	(Iran) Mehran Alighadr
Farsh Ara	(Iran) Ghodrat Bahadori	(Iran) Saeid Sarvari
Foolad	(Iran) Aminollah Paymard	(Iran) Hossein Akbarzadeh
Ghand Katrin	(Iran) Javad Asghari Moghaddam	(Iran) Saeid Taghizadeh
Giti Pasand	(Iran) Mohammad Keshavarz	(Iran) Ali Asghar Hassanzadeh
Gohar Zamin	(Iran) Hossein Afzali	(Iran)
Mes Sungun	(Iran) Esmaeil Taghipour	(Iran) Babak Nassiri
Moghavemat	(Iran) Mehrdad Lotfi	(Iran) Ehsan Soheili Moghaddam
Rokn Azin	(Iran) Hossein Eslami	(Iran) Mohammad Eidi
Safir Gofteman	(Iran) Reza Zarkhanli	(Iran) Mostafa Nematvand
Sanaye Poshtiban	(Iran) Hadi Bezval	(Iran) Mohammad Baniasadi
Sunich	(Iran) Hossein Sabouri	(Iran) Reza Sepandar
Zandi Beton	(Iran) Mohammad Javad Rezaei	(Iran) Saman Ghazvinipour

=== Number of teams by region ===
	Region	Number of teams	Teams
1	Mazandaran	2	Ghand Katrin, Zandi Beton
2	Razavi Khorasan	2	Farsh Ara, Rokn Azin
3	Kerman	2	Foolad, Gohar Zamin
4	Qom	1	Ana Sanat Pasargad
5	Hormozgan	1	Sanaye Poshtiban
6	Tehran	1	Safir Gofteman
7	Alborz	1	Moghavemat
8	East Azerbaijan	1	Mes Sungun
9	Isfahan	1	Giti Pasand
10	Markazi	1	Sunich
11	Qazvin	1	Crop

== League table ==
Pos	Team	Pld	W	D	L	GF	GA	GD	Pts	Qualification or relegation
1	Mes Sungun	26	23	0	3	119	58	+61	69	Qualification for the AFC Futsal Club Championship
2	Giti Pasand	26	19	3	4	102	50	+52	60	
3	Crop	26	18	2	6	71	47	+24	56	
4	Sunich	26	14	5	7	73	67	+6	47	
5	Gohar Zamin	26	13	2	11	86	77	+9	41	
6	Foolad	26	11	3	12	65	69	−4	36	
7	Safir Gofteman	26	10	5	11	66	80	−14	35	
8	Zandi Beton	26	9	6	11	79	83	−4	33	
9	Ghand Katrin	26	9	4	13	68	80	−12	31	
10	Farsh Ara	26	8	6	12	59	75	−16	30	
11	Ana Sanat	26	8	4	14	52	66	−14	28	
12	Sanaye Poshtiban	26	7	4	15	61	76	−15	25	
13	Moghavemat	26	4	6	16	57	81	−24	18	Relegation to the 1st Division
14	Rokn Azin	26	3	2	21	52	101	−49	11	Relegation to the 1st Division

Updated to match(es) played on 25 August 2023. Source: Futsal2020
Rules for classification: 1) Points; 2) Goal difference; 3) Goals scored.

== Results ==
Home \ Away	ASP	CRO	ARA	FZI	GKA	SGP	GZS	MES	MOA	RAK	SGT	SPH	SUN	ZBK
Ana Sanat		0–2	4–2				1–4		2–0	4–1		1–1	2–2	
Crop				2–1	3–1	3–3	5–3	3–4			2–0			2–1
Farsh Ara		1–3			3–4	2–3		3–4			3–2			2–2
Foolad	5–0		1–2				4–2		4–4	4–3		2–1	1–2	
Ghand Katrin	3–3								5–4	6–3		4–2	2–3	
Giti Pasand	2–0			6–3	4–2		8–4	7–3			9–0			7–3
Gohar Zamin					2–1			3–1	8–4	3–1	1–1	5–2		
Mes Sungun	7–2			4–1	5–2					8–3	7–1			
Moghavemat		1–2	5–2					0–1				1–1		1–1
Rokn Azin		1–4	2–5			0–2			2–2			1–2		
Safir Gofteman				3–4	4–4				4–3	4–3			1–3	
Sanaye Poshtiban			0–0			2–1		4–7			4–0			5–3
Sunich		4–2	1–1			3–3	8–3		5–1	4–2		4–3		
Zandi Beton	5–1			5–3	5–2		5–3	2–6			2–2		1–1	

Updated to match(es) played on 6 November 2022. Source: Futsalplanet
Legend: Blue = home team win; Yellow = draw; Red = away team win.

=== Positions by round ===
Team ╲ Round	1	2	3	4	5	6	7	8	9	10	11	12	13	14	15	16	17	18	19	20	21	22	23	24	25	26
Mes Sungun	2	1	4	4	3	3	2	1	1	1	1	1														1
Giti Pasand	1	5	3	3	4	4	3	3	4	3	2	2														2
Crop	4	3	2	2	1	2	4	4	2	4	4	4														3
Sunich	3	2	1	1	2	1	1	2	3	2	3	3														4
Gohar Zamin	5	7	5	7	6	5	5	6	5	5	5	5														5
Foolad	9	6	8	6	7	8	10	7	8	10	7	7														6
Safir Gofteman	14	14	14	9	11	7	9	10	9	12	12	12														7
Zandi Beton	12	11	10	12	8	9	7	8	7	7	8	6														8
Ghand Katrin	11	10	12	13	13	12	12	11	11	9	10	9														9
Farsh Ara	6	8	9	10	10	10	8	9	10	8	9	10														10
Ana Sanat	7	9	6	8	9	11	11	12	13	11	11	11														11
Sanaye Poshtiban	8	4	7	5	5	6	6	5	6	6	6	8														12
Moghavemat	13	12	11	11	12	13	13	13	12	13	13	13														13
Rokn Azin	10	13	13	14	14	14	14	14	14	14	14	14														14

Leader / AFC Futsal Club Championship
Relegation to the 1st Division

Updated to match(es) played on 7 September 2023. Source: Futsalcasa

== Clubs season-progress ==
Team ╲ Round	1	2	3	4	5	6	7	8	9	10	11	12	13	14	15	16	17	18	19	20	21	22	23	24	25	26
Ana Sanat	D	D	W	L	L	L	L	D	L	W	L	W	L	W	W	L	L	L	L	L	L	D	W	L	W	W
Crop	W	W	W	W	W	D	L	W	W	L	W	W	W	W	L	L	W	W	L	W	L	W	W	W	D	W
Farsh Ara	W	L	L	L	D	D	W	L	L	W	D	L	L	W	W	W	L	L	D	D	L	W	L	W	D	L
Foolad	L	W	L	W	L	L	L	W	L	D	W	W	W	L	L	W	W	L	L	W	L	L	W	D	D	W
Ghand Katrin	L	D	L	L	L	W	L	W	D	W	L	W	L	L	L	W	L	L	W	L	D	W	W	W	D	L
Giti Pasand	W	L	W	W	W	D	W	W	D	W	W	W	D	L	W	L	W	W	W	W	W	W	W	W	L	W
Gohar Zamin	W	L	W	L	W	W	D	L	W	L	W	L	W	W	W	L	L	W	W	L	L	L	D	L	W	W
Mes Sungun	W	W	L	W	W	W	W	W	W	W	W	L	W	W	W	W	W	W	W	W	W	W	L	W	W	W
Moghavemat	L	D	D	L	L	L	D	L	W	D	L	L	D	L	L	W	L	L	W	W	D	L	L	L	L	L
Rokn Azin	L	L	D	L	L	L	L	L	L	L	L	L	W	L	L	L	L	L	L	D	W	L	L	L	W	L
Safir Gofteman	L	L	D	W	L	W	D	L	D	L	L	L	W	W	W	W	W	L	L	W	W	L	W	D	D	L
Sanaye Poshtiban	D	W	L	W	W	L	D	W	L	L	D	L	L	L	L	W	L	W	L	L	L	W	L	L	D	L
Sunich	W	W	W	W	D	W	W	D	D	W	D	W	L	W	L	L	W	W	W	L	W	L	D	W	L	L
Zandi Beton	L	D	D	L	W	D	W	L	W	L	D	W	L	L	W	L	W	W	D	L	W	D	L	L	L	W

Updated to match(es) played on 7 September 2023. Source: Futsalcasa
W = Win; D = Draw; L = Lose; W/O = Withdrew

== Awards ==
- Winner: Mes Sungun
- Runners-up: Giti Pasand
- Third-Place: Crop
- Top scorer: (Iran) Mahdi Javid (Mes Sungun) (37 goals)
- Best player: (Iran) Salar Aghapour (Mes Sungun)
- Best manager: (Iran) Esmaeil Taghipour (Mes Sungun)
- Best goalkeeper: (Iran) Saeid Momeni (Crop)
- Best young player: (Iran) Mojtaba Parsapour (Mes Sungun)
- Best team: Mes Sungun
- Fairplay man:
- Fairplay team: Sanaye Poshtiban
- Best referee:
