= 2023–24 Iranian Futsal Super League =

Iranian Futsal Super League
- Season: 2023–24
- Matches: 41
- Goals: 197 (4.8 per match)
- Top goalscorer: Mohammad Hossein Derakhshani (8 goals)

The 2023–24 Iranian Futsal Super League is the 25th season of the Iran Pro League and the 20th under the name Futsal Super League. Mes Sungun are the defending champions. The season will feature 12 teams from the 2022–23 Super League and two new teams promoted from the 2022–23 Iran Futsal's 1st Division.

== Teams ==
=== Stadiums and locations ===
Locations of clubs in 2023–24 Iranian Futsal Super League

Team	Location	Indoor stadium	Capacity	Past Season
Ana Sanat	Qom	Shahid Heidarian	2,000	11th
Crop	Alvand	Yadegar Imam	3,500	3rd
Farsh Ara	Mashhad	Shahid Beheshti	6,000	10th
Foolad	Zarand	Azad University	1,700	6th
Giti Pasand	Isfahan	Pirouzi	4,300	2nd
Gohar Zamin	Sirjan	Imam Ali	–	5th
Iralco	Arak	Aluminium	–	Promoted
Mes Sungun	Tabriz	Shahid Poursharifi	6,000	Champion
Moghavemat	Karaj	Enghelab Eslami	2,500	Replaced for Zandi Beton
Palayesh Naft	Bandar Abbas	Fajr	4,000	12th
Poushak Hafez	Sari	Sayed Rasoul Hosseini	3,727	Replaced for Ghand Katrin
Safir Gofteman	Tehran	Fatemeh Al Zahra	–	7th
Shahrdari	Saveh	Imam Khomeini	–	Promoted
Sunich	Saveh	Fajr-e Felestin	2,500	4th

=== Personnel ===
Team	Manager	Captain
Ana Sanat	(Iran) Hossein Sabouri	(Iran) Hashem Farajzadeh
Crop	(Iran) Alireza Afzal	(Iran) Ahmad Esmaeilpour
Farsh Ara	(Iran) Mohsen Hassanzadeh	(Iran) Saeid Sarvari
Foolad	(Iran) Abbas Rouzpeikar	(Iran) Hossein Akbarzadeh
Giti Pasand	(Iran) Mohammad Keshavarz	(Iran) Mohammad Reza Sangsefidi
Gohar Zamin	(Iran) Hossein Afzali	
Iralco	(Iran) Reza Kordi	(Iran) Ashkan Salehi
Mes Sungun	(Iran) Esmaeil Taghipour	(Iran) Farhad Fakhimzadeh
Moghavemat	(Iran) Mehrdad Lotfi	(Iran) Shayan Banaderi
Palayesh Naft	(Iran) Hadi Bezval	(Iran) Mohammad Baniasadi
Poushak Hafez	(Iran) Mostafa Nazari	(Iran) Taha Mortazavi
Safir Gofteman	(Iran) Reza Zarkhanli	(Iran) Elias Barati
Shahrdari	(Iran) Saeid Keshavarzi	(Iran) Mehrdad Karimi
Sunich	(Iran) Javad Asghari Moghaddam	(Iran) Reza Sepandar

=== Number of teams by region ===
	Region	Number of teams	Teams
1	Markazi	3	Sunich, Shahrdari, Iralco
2	Kerman	2	Foolad, Gohar Zamin
3	Qom	1	Ana Sanat Pasargad
4	Tehran	1	Safir Gofteman
5	Mazandaran	1	Poushak Hafez
6	Hormozgan	1	Palayesh Naft
7	Alborz	1	Moghavemat
8	East Azerbaijan	1	Mes Sungun
9	Isfahan	1	Giti Pasand
10	Razavi Khorasan	1	Farsh Ara
11	Qazvin	1	Crop

== League table ==
Pos	Team	Pld	W	D	L	GF	GA	GD	Pts	Qualification or relegation
1	Giti Pasand	6	6	0	0	24	7	+17	18	Qualification for the AFC Futsal Club Championship
2	Mes Sungun	6	5	1	0	27	11	+16	16	
3	Safir Gofteman	6	4	1	1	22	15	+7	13	
4	Ana Sanat	6	4	1	1	16	10	+6	13	
5	Gohar Zamin	6	3	1	2	15	10	+5	10	
6	Farsh Ara	6	2	4	0	10	6	+4	10	
7	Shahrdari	6	2	2	2	12	16	−4	8	
8	Sunich	6	2	0	4	18	18	0	6	
9	Palayesh Naft	6	1	3	2	14	17	−3	6	
10	Crop	6	1	1	4	9	18	−9	4	
11	Iralco	6	1	1	4	7	17	−10	4	
12	Foolad	6	0	3	3	7	13	−6	3	
13	Poushak Hafez	5	0	1	4	10	19	−9	1	Relegation to the 1st Division
14	Moghavemat	5	0	1	4	6	20	−14	1	Relegation to the 1st Division

Updated to match(es) played on 7 September 2023. Source: Varzesh3
Rules for classification: 1) Points; 2) Goal difference; 3) Goals scored.

== Results ==
Home \ Away	ASP	CRO	ARA	FZI	SGP	GZS	IRA	MES	MOA	PNB	PHS	SGT	SHS	SUN
Ana Sanat				3–1							4–0			4–2
Crop					0–2			1–6		1–1				
Farsh Ara	0–0											1–1	1–1	
Foolad			0–3					1–1			3–3			
Giti Pasand							5–0		6–1	5–2				
Gohar Zamin		5–1			1–2									2–1
Iralco	1–2	1–4	2–2	1–0										
Mes Sungun									6–1	6–4		4–1		
Moghavemat						0–2				2–2			2–4	
Palayesh Naft						1–1	4–2							
Poushak Hafez			2–3									3–4		
Safir Gofteman	6–3					5–4							5–0	
Shahrdari		3–2		2–2										2–4
Sunich					3–4			3–4			5–2			

Updated to match(es) played on 7 September 2023. Source: Varzesh3
Legend: Blue = home team win; Yellow = draw; Red = away team win.

=== Positions by round ===
Team ╲ Round	1	2	3	4	5	6	7	8	9	10	11	12	13	14	15	16	17	18	19	20	21	22	23	24	25	26
Giti Pasand	4	2	2	2	2	1																				
Mes Sungun	1	1	1	1	1	2																				
Safir Gofteman	6	4	3	3	3	3																				
Ana Sanat	2	7	5	5	5	4																				
Gohar Zamin	11	9	8	4	4	5																				
Farsh Ara	7	5	7	6	6	6																				
Shahrdari	3	3	6	8	7	7																				
Sunich	14	6	4	7	8	8																				
Palayesh Naft	13	10	10	9	9	9																				
Crop	10	14	14	14	13	10																				
Iralco	5	8	9	10	10	11																				
Foolad	12	13	12	12	11	12																				
Poushak Hafez	9	12	11	11	12	13																				
Moghavemat	8	11	13	13	14	14																				

Leader / AFC Futsal Club Championship
Relegation to the 1st Division

Updated to match(es) played on 7 September 2023. Source: Futsalcasa

== Clubs season-progress ==
Team ╲ Round	1	2	3	4	5	6	7	8	9	10	11	12	13	14	15	16	17	18	19	20	21	22	23	24	25	26
Ana Sanat	W	L	W	D	W	W																				
Crop	L	L	L	L	D	W																				
Farsh Ara	D	W	D	D	W	D																				
Foolad	L	L	L	D	D	D																				
Giti Pasand	W	W	W	W	W	W																				
Gohar Zamin	L	D	W	W	W	L																				
Iralco	W	L	D	L	L	L																				
Mes Sungun	W	W	W	W	W	D																				
Moghavemat		L	L	L	L	D																				
Palayesh Naft	L	D	L	W	D	D																				
Poushak Hafez		L	L	D	L	L																				
Safir Gofteman	D	W	W	W	L	W																				
Shahrdari	W	W	L	L	D	D																				
Sunich	L	W	W	L	L	L																				

Updated to match(es) played on 7 September 2023. Source: Futsalcasa
W = Win; D = Draw; L = Lose; W/O = Withdrew

== Awards ==
- Winner:
- Runners-up:
- Third-Place:
- Top scorer:
- Best player:
- Best manager:
- Best goalkeeper:
- Best young player:
- Best team:
- Fairplay man:
- Fairplay team:
- Best referee:
