= 2021–22 Iranian Futsal Super League =

Iranian Futsal Super League
- Season: 2021–22
- Champions: Giti Pasand
- Relegated: Melli Haffari; Shahrvand
- Matches: 182
- Goals: 1,018 (5.59 per match)
- Top goalscorer: Saeid Ahmadabbasi (41 goals)
- Biggest home win: Mes Sungun 11–0 Chips Kamel (15 August 2021)
- Biggest away win: Chips Kamel 1–11 Giti Pasand (3 December 2021)
- Highest scoring: Sunich 11–3 Melli Haffari (25 December 2021)
- Longest winning run: 8 matches Moghavemat
- Longest unbeaten run: 14 matches Mes Sungun
- Longest winless run: 11 matches Shahrvand
- Longest losing run: 7 matches Raga

The 2021–22 Iranian Futsal Super League is the 23rd season of the Iran Pro League and the 18th under the name Futsal Super League. Mes Sungun are the defending champions. The season will feature 12 teams from the 2020–21 Super League and two new teams promoted from the 2020–21 Iran Futsal's 1st Division.

== Format changes ==
After the schedule problems caused by COVID-19 pandemic in Iran made some forced major changes in competition format of last season, it returned to its usual one-group round-robin format.

== Teams ==
=== Stadiums and locations ===
Locations of clubs in 2021–22 Iranian Futsal Super League

Team	Location	Indoor stadium	Capacity	Past Season
Chips Kamel	Mashhad	Karegaran	3,000	Replaced for Shahid Mansouri
Crop	Alvand	Yadegar Imam	3,500	5th
Farsh Ara	Mashhad	Shahid Beheshti	6,000	4th
Ferdows	Qom	Shahid Heidarian	2,000	7th
Foolad	Zarand	Azad University	1,700	Promoted
Giti Pasand	Isfahan	Pirouzi	4,300	2nd
Melli Haffari	Ahvaz	Imam Reza	1,000	9th
Mes Sungun	Varzaqan	Shahid Poursharifi	6,000	Champion
Moghavemat	Karaj	Enghelab Eslami	2,500	6th
Raga	Ray	Ayatollah Taleghani	500	8th
Sepahan	Isfahan	Abfa	–	Replaced for Ahoora
Shahrvand	Sari	Sayed Rasoul Hosseini	3,727	12th
Sunich	Saveh	Fajr-e Felestin	2,500	3rd
Zandi Beton	Kelardasht	Besat	–	Promoted

=== Personnel ===
Team	Manager	Captain
Chips Kamel	(Iran) Mohsen Jangi	(Iran) Adel Barjasteh
Crop	(Iran) Mahmoud Khorakchi	(Iran) Mahdi Javid
Farsh Ara	(Iran) Ghodrat Bahadori	(Iran) Saeid Sarvari
Ferdows	(Iran) Reza Zarkhanli	(Iran) Ruhollah Isari
Foolad	(Iran) Reza Kordi	(Iran) Hossein Akbarzadeh
Giti Pasand	(Iran) Mohammad Keshavarz	(Iran) Ali Asghar Hassanzadeh
Melli Haffari	(Iran) Heydar Farhadi	(Iran) Hossein Fahimi Moghaddam
Mes Sungun	(Iran) Hamid Bigham	(Iran) Alireza Samimi
Moghavemat	(Iran) Farhad Keshavarz	(Iran) Ehsan Soheili Moghaddam
Raga	(Iran) Mahdi Golpour	(Iran) Hassan Ahmadi
Sepahan	(Iran) Ahmad Baghbanbashi	(Iran) Mohammad Zareei
Shahrvand	(Iran) Masoud Najjarian	(Iran) Saeid Belbasi
Sunich	(Iran) Mohsen Hassanzadeh	(Iran) Ali Morovvati
Zandi Beton	(Iran) Reza Lak Aliabadi	(Iran) Rashid Gholipour

=== Number of teams by region ===
	Region	Number of teams	Teams
1	Mazandaran	2	Shahrvand, Zandi Beton
2	Razavi Khorasan	2	Farsh Ara, Chips Kamel
3	Isfahan	2	Giti Pasand, Sepahan
4	Alborz	1	Moghavemat
5	East Azerbaijan	1	Mes Sungun
6	Khuzestan	1	Melli Haffari
7	Qom	1	Ferdows
8	Kerman	1	Foolad
9	Markazi	1	Sunich
10	Tehran	1	Raga
11	Qazvin	1	Crop

== League table ==
Pos	Team	Pld	W	D	L	GF	GA	GD	Pts	Qualification or relegation
1	Giti Pasand (C)	26	21	1	4	129	54	+75	64	League Champions
2	Mes Sungun	26	19	3	4	88	41	+47	60	
3	Crop	26	18	5	3	104	62	+42	59	
4	Moghavemat	26	17	4	5	95	66	+29	55	
5	Sunich	26	17	3	6	96	55	+41	54	
6	Foolad	26	10	4	12	67	72	−5	34	
7	Farsh Ara	26	10	4	12	61	78	−17	34	
8	Sepahan	26	10	3	13	58	67	−9	33	
9	Zandi Beton	26	8	3	15	78	82	−4	27	
10	Ferdows	26	6	7	13	61	86	−25	25	
11	Chips Kamel	26	6	4	16	49	104	−55	22	
12	Raga	26	6	2	18	39	73	−34	20	
13	Melli Haffari (R)	26	5	2	19	48	90	−42	17	Relegation to the 1st Division
14	Shahrvand (R)	26	4	5	17	45	88	−43	17	Relegation to the 1st Division

Updated to match(es) played on 12 March 2022. Source: Futsal2020
Rules for classification: 1) Points; 2) Goal difference; 3) Goals scored.
(C) Champions; (R) Relegated

== Results ==
Home \ Away	CKM	CRO	ARA	FER	FZI	SGP	HFR	MES	MOA	RAG	SEI	SAR	SUN	ZBK
Chips Kamel		1–4	1–2	3–2	4–3	1–11	2–1	1–2	5–5	3–0	2–5	2–2	1–4	1–7
Crop	7–2		1–0	5–2	3–3	6–4	4–2	2–2	3–3	4–1	6–1	8–3	3–1	6–2
Farsh Ara	3–1	3–4		3–0	2–1	3–5	5–4	1–2	2–2	3–2	3–2	3–3	1–2	2–2
Ferdows	1–2	3–4	6–1		2–2	1–7	4–3	4–5	4–4	1–1	5–3	3–0	1–6	2–4
Foolad	7–1	2–6	2–2	2–3		1–7	3–0	1–3	3–2	3–0	5–3	0–0	4–3	5–2
Giti Pasand	4–1	6–2	6–0	9–2	7–2		7–2	3–1	3–6	4–1	3–0	5–1	4–3	6–4
Melli Haffari	3–3	3–6	1–4	1–3	3–2	0–6		0–2	2–3	2–0	2–1	1–3	1–2	3–0
Mes Sungun	11–0	4–1	4–2	7–1	4–1	3–3	6–1		3–2	2–1	2–3	2–0	3–3	4–3
Moghavemat	4–3	1–2	6–4	5–4	1–3	3–2	5–3	4–1		6–2	5–2	3–1	6–5	3–0
Raga	3–2	1–3	2–3	2–0	3–1	1–3	1–2	1–4	1–4		1–5	2–4	0–0	4–3
Sepahan	3–4	2–2	5–0	1–1	4–3	0–3	2–2	0–3	2–1	3–2		2–0	0–2	4–0
Shahrvand	2–2	1–4	3–4	2–2	3–4	1–3	2–1	0–4	3–6	4–1	1–3		1–4	3–7
Sunich	5–0	6–5	4–3	2–2	2–1	5–3	11–3	1–0	2–3	2–3	5–2	5–1		4–1
Zandi Beton	3–1	3–3	7–2	2–2	2–3	4–5	3–2	2–4	1–2	2–3	4–0	7–1	3–7	

Updated to match(es) played on 12 March 2022. Source: Futsalplanet
Legend: Blue = home team win; Yellow = draw; Red = away team win.

=== Positions by round ===
Team ╲ Round	1	2	3	4	5	6	7	8	9	10	11	12	13	14	15	16	17	18	19	20	21	22	23	24	25	26
Giti Pasand	7	11	6	3	2	2	2	1	2	1	1	1	1	1	1	1	1	1	1	1	1	1	1	1	1	1
Mes Sungun	1	8	3	4	3	3	3	3	3	3	3	2	2	2	2	2	2	3	3	3	2	4	2	2	2	2
Crop	3	2	5	5	6	5	5	5	5	5	5	5	4	4	4	4	4	2	2	2	3	2	4	3	3	3
Moghavemat	3	3	2	2	4	4	4	4	4	4	4	4	5	5	5	5	5	5	5	5	4	3	5	4	4	4
Sunich	2	1	1	1	1	1	1	2	1	2	2	3	3	3	3	3	3	4	4	4	5	5	3	5	5	5
Foolad	5	10	11	12	13	13	13	11	10	7	10	6	6	6	6	6	9	8	9	9	8	6	7	6	7	6
Farsh Ara	5	9	12	8	7	8	6	6	6	6	6	7	9	7	7	8	6	6	6	6	9	9	8	7	8	7
Sepahan	7	5	7	11	8	7	8	9	9	11	9	10	12	12	10	10	7	7	8	8	7	7	6	8	6	8
Zandi Beton	13	4	4	6	5	6	7	7	8	10	11	11	11	11	9	9	10	9	7	7	6	8	9	9	9	9
Ferdows	7	5	8	7	9	9	10	12	11	8	8	9	7	8	8	7	8	10	10	11	11	10	10	10	10	10
Chips Kamel	7	7	10	9	10	10	9	8	7	9	7	8	10	10	12	12	11	11	11	10	10	11	11	11	11	11
Raga	7	11	13	14	11	11	11	10	12	12	12	12	8	9	11	11	12	12	12	12	12	12	12	12	12	12
Melli Haffari	14	13	9	10	12	12	12	13	13	13	13	14	14	14	14	14	14	14	13	13	14	13	13	14	14	13
Shahrvand	7	14	14	13	14	14	14	14	14	14	14	13	13	13	13	13	13	13	14	14	13	14	14	13	13	14

Leader / AFC Futsal Club Championship
Relegation to the 1st Division

Updated to match(es) played on 12 March 2022. Source: Futsalcasa

== Clubs season-progress ==
Team ╲ Round	1	2	3	4	5	6	7	8	9	10	11	12	13	14	15	16	17	18	19	20	21	22	23	24	25	26
Chips Kamel	L	W	L	D	L	L	W	W	D	L	W	L	L	W	D	L	D	L	L	W	L	L	L	L	L	L
Crop	D	W	D	W	L	W	W	D	W	W	L	W	D	W	W	W	W	W	W	W	L	W	D	W	W	W
Farsh Ara	D	L	L	W	W	L	W	D	L	W	L	D	L	W	L	L	W	W	L	D	L	L	W	W	L	W
Ferdows	W	W	L	L	L	L	L	L	W	W	D	L	W	D	D	D	L	D	L	L	D	D	W	L	L	L
Foolad	D	L	D	L	L	W	L	D	W	W	L	W	W	L	D	L	L	W	L	L	W	W	L	W	L	W
Giti Pasand	W	L	W	W	W	W	W	W	D	W	W	W	W	W	L	W	W	L	W	W	W	W	W	W	L	W
Melli Haffari	L	L	W	L	L	W/O	L	L	W	L	L	L	L	L	D	D	L	L	W	L	L	W	L	L	L	W
Mes Sungun	W	L	W	W	W	W	W	D	D	W	W	W	W	W	D	W	L	L	W	W	W	L	W	W	W	W
Moghavemat	D	W	W	W	L	W	W	W	D	W	D	D	L	L	W	W	W	W	W	W	W	W	L	W	W	L
Raga	W	L	L	L	W	L	L	W	L	L	L	W	W	L	L	L	L	L	L	L	D	L	L	L	W	D
Sepahan	W/O	W	L	L	W	W	L	L	L	L	W	L	D	L	W	D	W	W	L	L	W	D	W	L	W	L
Shahrvand	W/O	L	L	D	L	L	L	D	L	L	W	W	L	D	L	L	D	L	L	D	L	L	L	W	W	L
Sunich	W	W	W	W	W	W	W	L	W	L	W	L	L	W	D	W	W	D	W	W	L	W	W	L	W	D
Zandi Beton	L	W	W	L	W	L	L	D	L	L	L	L	W	L	W	D	L	W	W	L	W	L	D	L	L	W/O

Updated to match(es) played on 12 March 2022. Source: Futsalcasa
W = Win; D = Draw; L = Lose; W/O = Withdrew

== Awards ==
- Winner: Giti Pasand
- Runners-up: Mes Sungun
- Third-Place: Crop
- Top scorer: Saeid Ahmadabbasi (Giti Pasand) (41 goals)
- Best player:
- Best manager:
- Best goalkeeper:
- Best team:
- Fairplay man:
- Best referee:
