= List of Iranian Futsal champions =

Iranian Futsal League

Province Championship (1996–2002) Premiere Futsal League (1998–2003) Futsal Super League (2003 - )
- Founded
- 1996
- Number of Teams
- 14
- Current Champions
- Mes Sungun
- Country
- Iran
- Most successful club
- Mes Sungun (4 times champions)

The Iranian futsal champions are the annual winners of Iranian Futsal Super League, Iran's premier annual Futsal league competition. The title has been contested since 1996, in varying forms of competition. While Mes Sungun has won a record 4 championship titles.

== Winners ==
=== Province championship (1996–2002) ===
Year	Winner (number of titles)	Runners-up	Third-Place	Top scorer (club) (goals)
1996–97	Gilan province (1)		Fars province	
1997–98	Tehran province (1)			
1998–99	Tehran province (2)	Tabriz province	Isfahan province	
1999–00	Fars province (1)			
2000–01	Tehran province (3)			
2001–02	Tehran province (4)			

=== Premier league (1998–2003) ===
Year	Winner (number of titles)	Runners-up	Third-Place	Top scorer (club) (goals)
1998–99	Peyman (1)			
1999–00	Peyman (2)	Faraz	Moghavemat Gilan	
2000–01	Esteghlal (1)	Hesa	Faraz	(Iran) Vahid Shamsaei (Peyman) (34)
2001–02	Esteghlal (2)	Pas	Hesa	
2002–03	Pas (1)	Esteghlal	Shensa	

=== Super league (2003– ) ===
Year	Winner (number of titles)	Runners-up	Third-Place	Top scorer (club) (goals)
2003–04	Shensa (1)	Shahid Mansouri	Eram Kish	(Iran) Mahmoud Lotfi (Shahrvand) (36)
2004–05	Tam Iran Khodro (1)	Eram Kish	Shensa	(Iran) Vahid Shamsaei (Eram Kish) (38)
2005–06	Shensa (2)	Tam Iran Khodro	Rah Ahan	Vahid Shamsaei (Tam Iran Khodro) (55)
2007–08	Tam Iran Khodro (2)	Shahid Mansouri	Foolad Mahan	(Iran) Mohammad Taheri (Shahid Mansouri) (52)
2008–09	Foolad Mahan (1)	Eram Kish	Tam Iran Khodro	(Iran) Morteza Azimaei (Rah) (Iran) Vahid Shamsaei (Foolad Mahan) (32)
2009–10	Foolad Mahan (2)	Shahid Mansouri	Melli Haffari	(Iran) Vahid Shamsaei (Foolad Mahan) (34)
2010–11	Shahid Mansouri (1)	Giti Pasand	Foolad Mahan	(Iran) Masoud Daneshvar (Giti Pasand) (24)
2011–12	Shahid Mansouri (2)	Giti Pasand	Foolad Mahan	(Iran) Ahmad Esmaeilpour (Shahid Mansouri) (32)
2012–13	Giti Pasand (1)	Saba	Shahid Mansouri	(Iran) Ali Asghar Hassanzadeh (Saba) (Iran) Ahmad Esmaeilpour (Giti Pasand) (28)
2013–14	Dabiri (1)	Giti Pasand	Melli Haffari	(Iran) Farhad Fakhimzadeh (Dabiri) (Iran) Ahmad Esmaeilpour (Giti Pasand) (25)
2014–15	Tasisat Daryaei (1)	Giti Pasand	Mes Sungun	(Iran) Moslem Rostamiha (Mes Sungun) (26)
2015–16	Tasisat Daryaei (2)	Mes Sungun	Giti Pasand	(Iran) Ali Asghar Hassanzadeh (Tasisat Daryaei) (29)
2016–17	Giti Pasand (2)	Dabiri	Mes Sungun	(Iran) Mahdi Javid (Giti Pasand) (36)
2017–18	Mes Sungun (1)	Tasisat Daryaei	Giti Pasand	(Iran) Mahdi Javid (Tasisat Daryaei) (35)
2018–19	Mes Sungun. (2)	Giti Pasand	Melli Haffari	(Iran) Mahdi Javid (Giti Pasand) (37)
2019–20	Mes Sungun (3)	Giti Pasand	Setaregan	(Iran) Mahdi Javid (Mes Sungun) (34)
2020–21	Mes Sungun (4)	Giti Pasand	Sunich	(Iran) Saeid Ahmadabbasi (Giti Pasand) (26)
2021–22	Giti Pasand (3)	Mes Sungun	Crop	(Iran) Saeid Ahmadabbasi (Giti Pasand) (41)
2022–23	Mes Sungun (5)	Giti Pasand	Crop	(Iran) Mahdi Javid (Mes Sungun) (37)
2023–24				

AFC Futsal Club Championship

== Performances ==
=== Most successful clubs ===
Club	Winner	Runner-up	Years won	Years runner-up
Mes Sungun	5	3	2017–18, 2018–19, 2019–20, 2020–21, 2022–23	2015–16, 2021–22, 2023–24
Giti Pasand	4	8	2012–13, 2016–17, 2021–22, 2023–24	2010–11, 2011–12, 2013–14, 2014–15, 2018–19, 2019–20, 2020–21, 2022–23
Shahid Mansouri	2	3	2010–11, 2011–12	2003–04, 2007–08, 2009–10
Esteghlal	2	1	2000–2001, 2001–02	2002–03
Tam Iran Khodro	2	1	2004–05, 2007–08	2005–06
Tasisat Daryaei	2	1	2014–15, 2015–16	2017–18
Peyman	2	0	1998–99, 1999–2000	
Shensa	2	0	2003–04, 2005–06	
Foolad Mahan	2	0	2008–09, 2009–10	
Pas	1	1	2002–03	2001–02
Dabiri	1	1	2013–14	2016–17
Eram Kish	0	2		2004–05, 2008–09
Faraz	0	1		1999–2000
Hesa	0	1		2000–2001
Saba	0	1		2012–13

=== Titles by city ===
City	Winners	Runners-up
Tehran	9	4
Tabriz	6	3
Isfahan	5	9
Qarchak	2	3
Saveh	2	0
Qom	0	4

=== Total titles won by province ===
The following table lists the Iranian futsal champions by Province.

Province	Titles	Winning clubs
Tehran	11	Shahid Mansouri (2), Esteghlal (2), Tam Iran Khodro (2), Tasisat Daryaei (2), Peyman (2), Pas (1)
East Azerbaijan	6	Mes Sungun (5), Dabiri (1)
Isfahan	5	Giti Pasand (3), Foolad Mahan (2)
Markazi	2	Shensa (2)

=== Title wins by decade ===
1990s	Team
2	Peyman

2000s	Team
2	Esteghlal, Shensa, Tam Iran Khodro, Foolad Mahan
1	Pas

2010s	Team
3	Mes Sungun
2	Shahid Mansouri, Tasisat Daryaei, Giti Pasand
1	Dabiri

2020s	Team
2	Mes Sungun
1	Giti Pasand

== See also ==
- Futsal in Iran
- Iranian Futsal Super League
- List of Iranian club futsal top goal scorers
- List of Iranian futsal league winning managers
