= 2020–21 Iranian Futsal Super League =

Iranian Futsal Super League
- Season: 2020–21
- Champions: Mes Sungun
- Relegated: Kowsar; Iman
- Matches: 126
- Goals: 736 (5.84 per match)
- Top goalscorer: Saeid Ahmadabbasi (26 Goals)

The 2020–21 Iranian Futsal Super League is the 22nd season of the Iran Pro League and the 17th under the name Futsal Super League. Mes Sungun are the defending champions. The season will feature 12 teams from the 2019–20 Super League and two new teams promoted from the 2019–20 Iran Futsal's 1st Division.

== Format changes ==
Final match of last season and the beginning of this season has some postponements due to COVID-19 pandemic in Iran. And other international futsal games have the same issues too. Therefore, this season has to be held squeezed and these changes has been made:

=== Regular season ===
14 teams will be divided to 2 groups of 7 teams each. Each Groups matches will be held in two regions (with two hosts) in a round-robin format. After the end of regular season, teams will be divided to 3 parts by their rankings:

1. Teams ranked 1st, 2nd and 3rd in each group (total 6 teams) will qualify for the Championship playoffs.
2. Teams ranked 4th and 5th in each group (total 4 teams) will remain in next season's super league.
3. Teams ranked 6th and 7th in each group (total 4 teams) will play in Relegation playoffs.

=== Playoffs ===
Championship playoffs will be held in round-robin format with 6 teams in 10 weeks. Final ranking of this round will define the champion.
Relegation playoffs will be held in round-robin format with 4 teams in 6 weeks. Teams ranked 3rd and 4th in this round will relegate to next season's 1st division.

== Teams ==
=== Stadiums and locations ===
Locations of clubs in 2019–20 Iranian Futsal Super League

Team	Location	Indoor stadium	Capacity	Past Season
Ahoora	Behbahan	Ali ibn Abi Talib	1,000	12th
Crop	Alvand	Yadegar Imam	3,500	Promoted
Farsh Ara	Mashhad	Shahid Beheshti	6,000	5th
Ferdows	Qom	Shahid Heidarian	2,000	7th
Giti Pasand	Isfahan	Shohadaye Mokhaberat	–	2nd
Iman	Shiraz	Shahid Abolfathi	–	Replaced for Labaniyat Arjan
Kowsar	Isfahan	Pirouzi	4,300	Replaced for Hypershahr
Melli Haffari	Ahvaz	Imam Reza	1,000	8th
Mes Sungun	Varzaqan	Shahid Poursharifi	6,000	Champion
Moghavemat	Karaj	Enghelab Eslami	2,500	10th
Raga	Ray	Ayatollah Taleghani	500	Promoted
Shahid Mansouri	Qarchak	Shohadaye 7th Tir	3,000	Replaced for Setaregan
Shahrvand	Sari	Sayed Rasoul Hosseini	3,727	6th
Sunich	Saveh	Fajr-e Felestin	2,500	4th

=== Personnel ===
Team	Manager	Captain
Ahoora	(Iran) Mohsen Alipour Sakhavi	(Iran) Sajjad Masihi
Crop	(Iran) Mansour Molaei	(Iran) Mahdi Javid
Farsh Ara	(Iran) Majid Mortezaei	(Iran) Saeid Sarvari
Ferdows	(Iran) Hossein Sabouri	(Iran) Nasser Etminan
Giti Pasand	(Iran) Vahid Shamsaei	(Iran) Ali Asghar Hassanzadeh
Iman	(Iran) Hamid Reza Abrarinia	(Iran) Morteza Keshavarz
Kowsar	(Iran) Davoud Tavassol	(Iran) Majid Kiani
Melli Haffari	(Iran) Kiyavash Alasvand	(Iran) Farid Namazi
Mes Sungun	(Iran) Ahmad Baghbanbashi	(Iran) Farhad Fakhimzadeh
Moghavemat	(Iran) Farhad Keshavarz	(Iran) Morteza Ezzati
Raga	(Iran) Mohammad Keshavarz	(Iran) Mohammad Keshavarz
Shahid Mansouri	(Iran) Mohsen Hassanzadeh	(Iran) Mohammad Taheri
Shahrvand	(Iran) Masoud Najjarian	(Iran) Taha Mortazavi
Sunich	(Iran) Javad Asghari Moghaddam	(Iran) Nader Hanifi

=== Number of teams by region ===
	Region	Number of teams	Teams
1	Tehran	2	Shahid Mansouri, Raga
2	Khuzestan	2	Melli Haffari, Ahoora
3	Isfahan	2	Giti Pasand, Kowsar
4	Alborz	1	Moghavemat
5	East Azerbaijan	1	Mes Sungun
6	Mazandaran	1	Shahrvand
7	Razavi Khorasan	1	Farsh Ara
8	Qom	1	Ferdows
9	Markazi	1	Sunich
10	Fars	1	Iman
11	Qazvin	1	Crop

== Regular season ==
=== Group A ===
Pos	Team	Pld	W	D	L	GF	GA	GD	Pts	Qualification or relegation
1	Giti Pasand	12	8	3	1	48	31	+17	27	Qualification for the Championship Playoffs
2	Moghavemat	12	7	1	4	43	32	+11	22	Qualification for the Championship Playoffs
3	Crop	12	4	4	4	36	35	+1	16	Qualification for the Championship Playoffs
4	Ferdows	12	4	3	5	36	36	0	15	
5	Shahid Mansouri	12	4	1	7	30	39	−9	13	
6	Shahrvand	12	3	3	6	42	46	−4	12	Qualification for the Relegation Playoffs
7	Ahoora	12	3	3	6	21	37	−16	12	Qualification for the Relegation Playoffs

Updated to match(es) played on March 7, 2021. Source: Futsal Casa
Rules for classification: 1) Points; 2) Goal difference; 3) Goals scored.

=== Group B ===
Pos	Team	Pld	W	D	L	GF	GA	GD	Pts	Qualification or relegation
1	Mes Sungun	12	8	2	2	49	23	+26	26	Qualification for the Championship Playoffs
2	Farsh Ara	12	8	2	2	38	30	+8	26	Qualification for the Championship Playoffs
3	Sunich	12	8	1	3	52	35	+17	25	Qualification for the Championship Playoffs
4	Raga	12	4	2	6	29	32	−3	14	
5	Melli Haffari	12	4	2	6	36	46	−10	14	
6	Kowsar	12	3	2	7	38	48	−10	11	Qualification for the Relegation Playoffs
7	Iman	12	0	3	9	20	48	−28	3	Qualification for the Relegation Playoffs

Updated to match(es) played on March 7, 2021. Source: Futsal Casa
Rules for classification: 1) Points; 2) Goal difference; 3) Goals scored.

== Playoffs ==
=== Championship Playoffs ===
Pos	Team	Pld	W	D	L	GF	GA	GD	Pts	Qualification or relegation
1	Mes Sungun (C)	10	7	1	2	37	22	+15	22	League Champions
2	Giti Pasand	10	6	2	2	32	17	+15	20	
3	Sunich	10	5	2	3	24	21	+3	17	
4	Farsh Ara	10	3	1	6	19	30	−11	10	
5	Crop	10	3	1	6	21	33	−12	10	
6	Moghavemat	10	2	1	7	20	30	−10	7	

Updated to match(es) played on 13 March 2022. Source: Futsal Casa
Rules for classification: 1) Points; 2) Goal difference; 3) Goals scored.
(C) Champions

=== Relegation Playoffs ===
Pos	Team	Pld	W	D	L	GF	GA	GD	Pts	Qualification or relegation
1	Ahoora	6	3	2	1	18	15	+3	11	
2	Shahrvand	6	3	1	2	17	14	+3	10	
3	Kowsar (R)	6	2	3	1	18	13	+5	9	Relegation to the 1st Division
4	Iman (R)	6	0	2	4	12	23	−11	2	Relegation to the 1st Division

Updated to match(es) played on 13 March 2022. Source: Futsal Casa
Rules for classification: 1) Points; 2) Goal difference; 3) Goals scored.
(R) Relegated

== Awards ==
- Winner: Mes Sungun
- Runners-up: Giti Pasand
- Third-Place: Sunich
- Top scorer: Saeid Ahmadabbasi (Giti Pasand) (26 goals)
- Best player:
- Best manager:
- Best goalkeeper:
- Best team:
- Fairplay man:
- Best referee:
