= 2019–20 Iranian Futsal Super League =

Iranian Futsal Super League
- Season: 2019–20
- Champions: Mes Sungun
- Relegated: Azarakhsh; Shahin
- Matches: 200
- Goals: 1,127 (5.64 per match)
- Top goalscorer: Mahdi Javid (34 goals)
- Biggest home win: Giti Pasand 10 – 2 Azarakhsh
- Biggest away win: Moghavemat 2 – 7 Mes Sungun
- Highest scoring: Shahin 7 – 7 Azarakhsh

The 2019–20 Iranian Futsal Super League is the 21st season of the Iran Pro League and the 16th under the name Futsal Super League. Mes Sungun are the defending champions. The season will feature 12 teams from the 2018–19 Super League and two new teams promoted from the 2018–19 Iran Futsal's 1st Division, Shahin and Hyper Shahr.

== Teams ==
=== Stadia, locations and Personnel ===
Locations of clubs in 2019–20 Iranian Futsal Super League

Team	City	Venue	Capacity	Head coach	Team captain	Past Season
Ahoora	Behbahan	Ali ibn Abi Talib	1,000	(Iran) Mohammad Hojjat	(Iran) Amir Shojaei	12th
Azarakhsh	Sarkhun	Fajr	4,000	(Iran) Abbas Rouzpeikar	(Iran) Mohammad Bani Asadi	9th
Farsh Ara	Mashhad	Shahid Beheshti	6,000	(Iran) Majid Mortezaei	(Iran) Ghodrat Bahadori	5th
Giti Pasand	Isfahan	Pirouzi	4,300	(Iran) Hamid Bigham	(Iran) Mohammad Keshavarz	2nd
Hyper Shahr	Shahin Shahr	Takhti	3,500	(Iran) Mehrdad Jaberi	(Iran) Majid Kiani	Promoted
Labaniyat Arjan	Shiraz	Shahid Abolfathi	–	(Iran) Hamid Reza Kamali	(Iran) Reza Javanbakht	10th
Melli Haffari	Ahvaz	Emam Reza	1,000	(Iran) Kiyavash Alasvand	(Iran) Farid Namazi	3rd
Mes Sungun	Varzaqan	Shahid Pour Sharifi	6,000	(Iran) Alireza Afzal	(Iran) Farhad Fakhimzadeh	Champion
Moghavemat	Karaj	Enghelab Eslami	2,500	(Iran) Farhad Keshavarz	(Iran) Alireza Mahmoudi	8th
Setaregan	Varamin	Shahid Golabbasi	1,500	(Iran) Reza Davarzani	(Iran) Mohammad Taheri	Replaced for Moghavemat Qarchak
Shahin	Kermanshah	Shohadaye Bazi Deraz	700	(Iran) Mohsen Khabiri	(Iran) Hamed Eivani	Promoted
Shahrvand	Sari	Sayed Rasoul Hosseini	5,000	(Iran) Reza Lak Aliabadi	(Iran) Taha Mortazavi	7th
Sohan Mohammad Sima	Qom	Shahid Heidarian	2,000	(Iran) Vahid Ghiasi	(Iran) Hashem Farajzadeh	4th
Sunich	Saveh	Fajr-e Felestin	2,500	(Iran) Javad Asghari Moghaddam	(Iran) Nader Hanifi	6th

=== Number of teams by region ===
	Region	Number of teams	Teams
1	Khuzestan	2	Melli Haffari, Ahoora
2	Isfahan	2	Giti Pasand, Hyper Shahr
3	Qom	1	Sohan Mohammad Sima
4	Mazandaran	1	Shahrvand
5	Kermanshah	1	Shahin
6	Alborz	1	Moghavemat
7	East Azerbaijan	1	Mes Sungun
8	Markazi	1	Sunich
9	Tehran	1	Setaregan
10	Hormozgan	1	Azarakhsh
11	Razavi Khorasan	1	Farsh Ara
12	Fars	1	Labaniyat Arjan

== League table ==
Pos	Team	Pld	W	D	L	GF	GA	GD	Pts	Qualification or relegation
1	Mes Sungun	26	19	3	4	100	50	+50	60	Qualification for the Championship Playoffs
2	Giti Pasand	26	15	9	2	89	56	+33	54	Qualification for the Championship Playoffs
3	Farsh Ara	26	13	7	6	67	50	+17	46	Qualification for the Championship Playoffs
4	Shahrvand	26	13	6	7	87	74	+13	45	Qualification for the Championship Playoffs
5	Setaregan	26	13	3	10	78	75	+3	42	Qualification for the Championship Playoffs
6	Sunich	26	11	6	9	82	64	+18	39	Qualification for the Championship Playoffs
7	Sohan Mohammad Sima	26	11	5	10	77	68	+9	38	Qualification for the Championship Playoffs
8	Melli Haffari	26	9	4	13	53	74	−21	31	Qualification for the Championship Playoffs
9	Hyper Shahr	26	8	5	13	62	84	−22	29	
10	Moghavemat	26	8	5	13	61	83	−22	29	
11	Labaniyat Arjan	26	7	5	14	55	72	−17	26	
12	Ahoora	26	7	3	16	74	93	−19	24	
13	Azarakhsh (R)	26	6	6	14	59	80	−21	24	Relegation to the 1st Division
14	Shahin (R)	26	5	7	14	75	94	−19	22	Relegation to the 1st Division

Updated to match(es) played on 13 March 2022. Source: Futsal Casa
Rules for classification: 1) Points; 2) Goal difference; 3) Goals scored.
(R) Relegated

== Results ==
Home \ Away	AHO	ARJ	AZA	ARA	SGP	HSS	HFR	MES	MOA	SET	SHK	SAR	SMS	SUN
Ahoora		3–4	2–1	2–1	3–3	5–6	7–1	4–7	3–1	2–2	2–4	6–4	2–1	4–6
Labaniyat Arjan	2–1		1–3	2–2	1–4	0–1	2–1	0–1	2–3	2–3	4–3	6–1	5–2	2–2
Azarakhsh	1–3	3–3		0–3	2–5	2–0	0–2	7–4	2–3	4–5	3–1	0–3	4–1	3–3
Farsh Ara	6–4	5–3	2–0		0–1	4–1	1–2	1–3	4–1	2–0	2–1	3–3	3–1	1–2
Giti Pasand	3–2	3–1	10–2	3–3		3–3	1–0	2–2	7–5	4–1	2–0	4–4	3–2	3–0
Hyper Shahr	3–3	4–2	1–1	1–3	3–6		3–0	1–4	2–3	3–5	6–2	3–2	4–3	4–3
Melli Haffari	4–1	3–1	1–2	2–2	3–0	2–2		3–2	0–3	5–2	4–2	2–4	0–3 (Note: The game score was 1-2.)	2–2
Mes Sungun	6–3	4–2	4–1	0–1	3–2	4–1	5–1		4–2	7–0	6–1	5–2	2–2	3–0
Moghavemat	1–0	3–3	4–4	1–3	2–2	2–0	2–2	2–7		2–6	2–2	3–6	3–0	0–1
Setaregan	5–4	2–3	2–0	6–3	3–3	1–1	9–1	2–4	5–4		1–3	2–1	4–3	4–3
Shahin	6–1	2–2	7–7	5–5	4–7	7–2	4–6	1–2	2–4	3–1		3–3	1–4	1–1
Shahrvand	5–2	3–0	4–2	3–3	3–3	4–2	3–0	4–4	5–2	2–1	7–4		3–2	0–4
Sohan Mohammad Sima	3–1	5–0	2–2	2–2	1–1	5–3	5–4	3–5	6–3	4–3	7–2	5–4		3–3
Sunich	7–4	5–2	4–3	1–2	3–4	8–2	6–2	3–2	5–0	2–3	4–4	3–4	1–2	

Updated to match(es) played on 16 January 2022. Source: Futsalcasa
Legend: Blue = home team win; Yellow = draw; Red = away team win.

=== Positions by round ===
Team ╲ Round	1	2	3	4	5	6	7	8	9	10	11	12	13	14	15	16	17	18	19	20	21	22	23	24	25	26
Mes Sungun	2	1	2	6	5	3	5	7	9	9	9	6	5	1	1	1										1
Giti Pasand	7	11	7	9	4	2	1	2	2	2	1	1	1	2	2	2										2
Farsh Ara	12	13	12	10	7	8	4	5	3	4	3	3	3	3	3	3										3
Shahrvand	14	7	9	11	12	12	10	10	5	7	5	7	6	6	5	5										4
Setaregan	3	8	10	12	9	9	9	4	6	8	6	4	4	7	7	6										5
Sunich	1	3	1	1	1	1	2	1	1	1	2	2	2	5	6	8										6
Sohan Mohammad Sima	13	5	3	4	6	5	3	3	4	3	4	5	7	4	4	4										7
Melli Haffari	5	2	5	2	3	7	8	6	8	6	8	8	8	8	8	7										8
Hyper Shahr	8	9	11	7	10	11	13	12	12	13	12	11	11	11	9	10										9
Moghavemat	4	6	4	5	8	6	7	9	10	11	10	10	9	9	10	9										10
Labaniyat Arjan	10	14	14	13	13	13	11	11	14	12	13	14	14	14	13	13										11
Ahoora	11	10	8	3	2	4	6	8	7	5	7	9	10	10	11	11										12
Azarakhsh	6	4	6	8	11	10	12	13	13	14	14	13	13	12	12	12										13
Shahin	9	12	13	14	14	14	14	14	11	10	11	12	12	13	14	14										14

Leader / AFC Futsal Club Championship
Relegation to the 1st Division

Updated to match(es) played on 18 February 2022. Source: Futsalplanet

== Championship Playoffs ==
=== Calendar ===
Round	Date	Fixtures	Clubs	Notes
Quarter-finals	1398/10/26; 1398/10/30; 1398/11/02 – 1398/11/25		8 → 4	Teams who win 2 games of 3, qualify to next round
Semifinals	1398/12/05; 1398/12/10; 1398/12/12		4 → 2	Teams who win 2 games of 3, qualify to next round
Final	1399/03/30; 1399/04/06; 1399/04/09 (in Kerman)		2 → 1	Team who wins 2 games of 3, becomes Champion.

=== Bracket ===
Quarter-finals
1	Mes Sungun	3 (5)	8	1	2
8	Melli Haffari	3 (6)	4	0	1
4	Shahrvand	1	5	2	1
5	Setaregan	3	0	3	2
2	Giti Pasand	6	5	-	2
7	Sohan Mohammad Sima	2	2	-	0
3	Farsh Ara	2	2	2 (3)	1
6	Sunich	4	0	2 (4)	2

Semifinals
1	Mes Sungun	5	2	-	2
5	Setaregan	1	0	-	0
2	Giti Pasand	7	4	5	2
6	Sunich	4	5	2	1

Final
1	Mes Sungun	4	3(6)	-	2
2	Giti Pasand	3	3(5)	-	0

== Awards ==
- Winner: Mes Sungun
- Runners-up: Giti Pasand
- Third-Place: Setaregan
- Top scorer: Mahdi Javid (Mes Sungun) (34 goals)
- Best player:
- Best manager:
- Best goalkeeper:
- Best team:
- Fairplay man:
- Best referee:
