= Iman F.C. =

Iranian futsal club

Iman
- Full name: Iman Shiraz Futsal Club
- Founded: 22 October 2020
- Dissolved: 2 January 2022
- Ground: Shahid Abolfathi Indoor Stadium, Shiraz

Iman Shiraz Futsal Club (Persian: باشگاه فوتسال ایمان شیراز) was an Iranian professional futsal club based in Shiraz.

== History ==
On 22 October 2020, the officials of Iman established the club by buying the points of Labaniyat Arjan, which was on the verge of bankruptcy, and participated in the 2020–21 Iranian Futsal Super League. Iman Shiraz Club was dissolved on 2 January 2022 after financial problems and its points were transferred to Heyat Football Darab Club.

== Season-by-season ==
The table below chronicles the achievements of the Club in various competitions.

Season	League									Leagues top goalscorer	
Season	Division	P	W	D	L	GF	GA	Pts	Pos	Name	Goals
2020–21	Super league	Replaced for Labaniyat Arjan								Morteza Keshavarz; Mohammad Reza Ahmadi	6
2020–21	Super league	12	0	3	9	20	48	3	7th	Morteza Keshavarz; Mohammad Reza Ahmadi	6
2020–21	Play Off	6	0	2	4	12	23	2	14th	Morteza Keshavarz; Mohammad Reza Ahmadi	6
Super league total		18	0	5	13	32	71	5			

Last updated: July 8, 2021

Notes:
* unofficial titles
1 worst title in history of club

Key

- P = Played
- W = Games won
- D = Games drawn
- L = Games lost
- GF = Goals for
- GA = Goals against
- Pts = Points
- Pos = Final position

Champions	Runners-up	Third Place	Fourth Place	Relegation	Promoted	Did not qualify	not held

== Managers ==
Last updated: July 8, 2021

Name	Nat	From	To	Record				
Name	Nat	From	To	M	W	D	L	Win %
Hamid Reza Kamali	(Iran)	October 2020	January 2021					
Hamid Reza Abrarinia	(Iran)	January 2021	May 2021					
