= Rokn Azin F.C. =

Rokn Azin
- Full name: Rokn Azin Khavarmianeh Futsal Club
- Founded: 2018; 7 years ago as Chips Kamel
- Ground: Shohadaye Taxirani Indoor Stadium, Mashhad
- Capacity: 500
- Owner: Hossein Mosallapour
- Chairman: Mahdi Khani
- Head coach: Hossein Eslami
- League: Iranian Futsal Super League
- 2021–22: 11th of 14
Home colours	Away colours

Rokn Azin Khavarmianeh Futsal Club (Persian: باشگاه فوتسال رکن آذین خاورمیانه) is an Iranian professional futsal club based in Mashhad.

== Season to season ==
The table below chronicles the achievements of the Club in various competitions.

Season	League									Leagues top goalscorer	
Season	Division	P	W	D	L	GF	GA	Pts	Pos	Name	Goals
2019–20	2nd Division	5	3	0	2	21	14	9	3rd / Group A		
2020–21	1st Division	10	5	2	3	28	20	17	4th / Group D	Nasser Haji; Sajjad Rezvani; Mohammad Eidi	4
2021–22	Super league	Replaced for Shahid Mansouri								Sina Hadian	9
2021–22	Super league	26	6	4	16	49	104	22	11th	Sina Hadian	9
2nd Division total		5	3	0	2	21	14	9			
1st Division total		10	5	2	3	28	20	17			
Super league total		26	6	4	16	49	104	22			
Total		41	14	6	21	98	138	48			

Last updated: 31 July 2022

Notes:
* unofficial titles
1 worst title in history of club

Key

- P = Played
- W = Games won
- D = Games drawn
- L = Games lost
- GF = Goals for
- GA = Goals against
- Pts = Points
- Pos = Final position

Champions	Runners-up	Third Place	Fourth Place	Relegation	Promoted	Did not qualify	not held

== Players ==
=== Current squad ===
As of 25 December 2022

#	Position	Name	Nationality
7		Omid Rakhshani	(Iran)
8		Sajjad Amani	(Iran)
9	Pivot	Mohammad Eidi	(Iran)
15		Abolfazl Minouei	(Iran)
17		Mani Ghane	(Iran)
20	Goalkeeper	Mohammad Javad Akbarzadeh	(Iran)
23		Hamid Reza Moradian	(Iran)
27		Sajjad Yousefzadeh	(Iran)
29		Keel	(Brazil)
31	Goalkeeper	Adel Barjasteh	(Iran)
77		Sina Hadian	(Iran)
98		Ali Asghar Soubdaei	(Iran)

== Personnel ==
=== Current technical staff ===
Position	Name
Head coach	(Iran) Hossein Eslami
Assistant coaches	(Iran) Mansour Molaei (Iran) Ehsan Masihabadi
Goalkeeping coach	(Iran) Ali Raouf
Supervisor	(Iran) Mojtaba Omrani

Last updated: 11 December 2022

== Managers ==
Last updated: 11 December 2022

Name	Nat	From	To	Record				
Name	Nat	From	To	M	W	D	L	Win %
Mohsen Jangi	(Iran)	February 2020	August 2022	49	14	7	28	28.57
Hamid Bigham	(Iran)	September 2022	December 2022	6	1	0	5	16.67
Hossein Eslami	(Iran)	December 2022	Present	0	0	0	0	—

== Club officials ==
Position	Name
Owner	(Iran) Hossein Mosallapour
Chairman	(Iran) Mahdi Khani
Vice-chairman	(Iran) Jamal Vafakhah
Consultant of chairman	(Iran) Bahman Houshmandfar
Chairman of the board	(Iran) Hossein Mosallapour
Members of the board	

Last updated: 7 December 2022
