= Kowsar Isfahan F.C. =

Iranian futsal club

Kowsar
- Full name: Bazarhaye Rouze Kowsar Isfahan Futsal Club
- Founded: 8 December 2020; 4 years ago
- Ground: Shohadaye Dinan Indoor Stadium, Dorcheh
- Chairman: Davoud Tavassol
- Head coach: Davoud Tavassol
- League: Iran Futsal's 1st Division
- 2020–21: 13th (relegated)

Bazarhaye Rouze Kowsar Isfahan Futsal Club (Persian: باشگاه فوتسال بازارهای روز کوثر اصفهان) is an Iranian professional futsal club based in Isfahan.

== History ==
On 8 December 2020, the officials of Bazarhaye Rouze Kowsar established the club by buying the points of Hyper Shahr, which was on the verge of bankruptcy, and participated in the 2020–21 Iranian Futsal Super League.

== Season-by-season ==
The table below chronicles the achievements of the Club in various competitions.

Season	League									Leagues top goalscorer	
Season	Division	P	W	D	L	GF	GA	Pts	Pos	Name	Goals
2020–21	Super league	Replaced for Hyper Shahr								Kambiz Gomroki	14
2020–21	Super league	12	3	2	7	38	48	11	6th	Kambiz Gomroki	14
2020–21	Play Off	6	2	3	1	18	13	9	13th	Kambiz Gomroki	14
Super league total		18	5	5	8	56	61	20			

Last updated: July 1, 2021

Notes:
* unofficial titles
1 worst title in history of club

Key

- P = Played
- W = Games won
- D = Games drawn
- L = Games lost
- GF = Goals for
- GA = Goals against
- Pts = Points
- Pos = Final position

Champions	Runners-up	Third Place	Fourth Place	Relegation	Promoted	Did not qualify	not held

== Players ==
=== Current squad ===
As of 11 December 2022

#	Position	Name	Nationality
3	Goalkeeper	Hamid Reza Zareei	(Iran)
4		Alireza Karimzadeh	(Iran)
6		Majid Kiani	(Iran)
8	Pivot	Hossein Ghapanchi	(Iran)
9		Ali Shahi	(Iran)
10		Ahmad Reza Nazari	(Iran)
15		Erfan Bahrami	(Iran)
16		Mehdi Kazemi	(Iran)
18		Reza Sohrabi	(Iran)
19		Mahdi Ayati	(Iran)
31		Sasan Saman Maniani	(Iran)
77		Mohsen Mahmoudi	(Iran)
99		Iman Edris	(Iran)

== Personnel ==
=== Current technical staff ===
Position	Name
Head coach	(Iran) Davoud Tavassol
Assistant coach	(Iran) Esmaeil Rostami
Technical director	(Iran) Amir Hossein Asadi
Goalkeeping coach	(Iran) Mehrdad Goudarzi
Supervisor	(Iran) Mohammad Reza Nikouei
Doctor	(Iran) Amin Bakhtiari
Procurment	(Iran) Amir Nassiri
Deputy communications	(Iran) Mohammad Hossein Janipour

Last updated: January 8, 2022

== Managers ==
Last updated: July 1, 2021

Name	Nat	From	To	Record				
Name	Nat	From	To	M	W	D	L	Win %
Saeid Rostami	(Iran)	December 2020	March 2021	12	3	2	7	25.00
Davoud Tavassol	(Iran)	March 2021	Present	6	2	3	1	33.33
