= Mahmoud Khorakchi =

Iranian footballer and futsal coach

Personal information
- Full name: Mahmoud Khorakchi
- Date of birth: 5 May 1970 (age 56)
- Place of birth: Tehran, Iran
- Position: Goalkeeper

Youth career
- Homa

Senior career*
Years	Team	Apps	(Gls)
- Gendarmerie
- Keshavarz
- Persepolis
- Polyacryl
- Machine Sazi
- Fath
–2000	Bargh		

International career^{‡}
1992	Iran		

Managerial career
- 2001–2005: Iran (assistant)
- 2002–2003: Persepolis
- 2003–2005: Chini Hamgam
- 2005–2006: Post
- 2006: Iran U23
- 2006–2009: Tam Iran Khodro
- 2010–2011: Gostaresh Foolad
- 2011: Shahrdari Saveh (technical manager)
- 2011–2012: Firooz Sofeh
- 2012–2014: Misagh
- 2014–2015: Shahrdari Saveh
- 2015: Giti Pasand
- 2015–2016: Misagh
- 2016–2017: Bank Dey
- 2017: Tasisat Daryaei (technical manager)
- 2017–2018: Parsian
- 2019–2020: Shahrdari Qarchak
- 2021–2022: Crop
- * Club domestic league appearances and goals as of 19 September 2022 ‡ National team caps and goals as of 27 April 2020

Mahmoud Khorakchi (Persian: محمود خوراکچی; born 5 May 1970) is an Iranian professional futsal coach and former footballer.

== Honours ==
=== Manager ===
- Iranian Futsal Super League
  - Champion : 2007–08 (Tam Iran Khodro)
  - Runners-up : 2005–06 (Tam Iran Khodro)
- Iranian Futsal Hazfi Cup
  - Runners-up : 2013–14 (Misagh)
