= Alireza Afzal =

Iranian futsal player and coach (born 1974)

Personal information
- Full name: Alireza Afzal
- Date of birth: 13 April 1974 (age 52)
- Place of birth: Isfahan, Iran

Youth career
- Esteghlal Isfahan

Senior career*
Years	Team	Apps	(Gls)
- Zob Ahan
- Shahab
- Post

International career^{‡}
1997–2001	Iran		

Managerial career
- 2007–2008: Elmo Adab
- 2008–2009: Foolad Mahan
- 2009–2011: Firooz Sofeh
- 2011–2013: Giti Pasand
- 2013–2014: Nik Andish Shahrdari
- 2014–2015: Kashi Nilou
- 2015–2017: Mes Sungun
- 2017: Giti Pasand
- 2019–2020: Mes Sungun
- 2020–2021: Mes Sungun (technical manager)
- 2021–2022: Sepahan (technical manager)
- * Club domestic league appearances and goals as of 6 September 2022 ‡ National team caps and goals as of 21 June 2020

Alireza Afzal (Persian: علیرضا افضل; born 13 April 1974) is an Iranian professional futsal coach and former player.

== Honours ==
=== Team ===
==== Country ====
- AFC Futsal Championship
  - Champion (1): 1999

=== Managerial Club ===
- Iranian Futsal Super League
  - Champions (3): 2008–09 (Foolad Mahan) - 2012–13 (Giti Pasand) - 2019–20 (Mes Sungun)
  - Runner-Up (1): 2011–12 (Giti Pasand)
- AFC Futsal Club Championship
  - Champion (1): 2012 (Giti Pasand)
  - Runner-Up (1): 2017 (Giti Pasand)
