= Sepahan S.C. (futsal) =

Iranian futsal club

Foolad Mobarakeh Sepahan
- Full name: Foolad Mobarakeh Sepahan Isfahan Futsal Club
- Nickname(s): طوفان زرد (Yellow Storm)
- Founded: 2 August 2021
- Dissolved: 2 July 2022
- Ground: Abfa Indoor Stadium, Isfahan
- Website: http://www.sepahansc.com/
Home colours	Away colours

Foolad Mobarakeh Sepahan Isfahan Futsal Club (Persian: باشگاه فوتسال فولاد مبارکه سپاهان اصفهان) was an Iranian professional futsal club based in Isfahan.

== Season to season ==
The table below chronicles the achievements of the Club in various competitions.

Season	League									Leagues top goalscorer	
Season	Division	P	W	D	L	GF	GA	Pts	Pos	Name	Goals
2021–22	Super league	Replaced for Ahoora								Milad Cheraghi	9
2021–22	Super league	26	10	3	13	58	67	33	8th	Milad Cheraghi	9
Total		26	10	3	13	58	67	33			

Last updated: 14 March 2022

Notes:
* unofficial titles
1 worst title in history of club

Key

- P = Played
- W = Games won
- D = Games drawn
- L = Games lost
- GF = Goals for
- GA = Goals against
- Pts = Points
- Pos = Final position

Champions	Runners-up	Third Place	Fourth Place	Relegation	Promoted	Did not qualify	not held

== Managers ==
Last updated: 6 September 2022

Name	Nat	From	To	Record				
Name	Nat	From	To	M	W	D	L	Win %
Ahmad Baghbanbashi	(Iran)	August 2021	March 2022	26	10	3	13	38.46

== See also ==
- Foolad Mobarakeh Sepahan Sport Club
