= 2023 AFC Futsal Club Championship =

كأس آسيا الأندية داخل الصالات 2023

Tournament details
- Host country: United Arab Emirates
- City: 5
- Dates: 1–23 July 2023
- Teams: 16
- Venues: 2 (in 4 host cities)
- All statistics correct as of 13 April 2023.

The 2023 AFC Futsal Club Championship was to be the 11th edition of the AFC Futsal Club Championship, the annual international futsal club championship in Asia organized by the Asian Football Confederation (AFC).

The schedule and hosts of the tournament are yet to be announced. The United Arab Emirates were originally confirmed by the AFC on 18 March 2020 as tournament hosts of the 2020 edition, which was originally scheduled to be held between 5–16 August 2020, but the AFC announced on 7 July 2020 that it was postponed to 2–13 December 2020 due to the COVID-19 pandemic. On 10 September 2020, the AFC announced that the 2020 tournament would be cancelled, and the United Arab Emirates would instead host the next event in 2021, which was scheduled to be held between 14–25 July 2021. However, on 18 March 2021, the AFC announced that the tournament would be cancelled again for the 2021 edition, and the United Arab Emirates would remain as the host for 2022 edition of the tournament. The 2022 edition was scheduled for 3–14 August, but was again cancelled on 7 May, after the United Arab Emirates withdrew from hosting the tournament.

A total of 16 teams were expected to take part in the tournament. Nagoya Oceans were the defending champions, having won the title in 2019.

== Teams ==
Assocation	Team	Qualifying method	App (last)
Japan	Nagoya Oceans	2022-23 F.League champions	10th
Iran	Mes Sungun	2022–23 Iranian Futsal Super League champions	3rd
Uzbekistan	FC AGMK	2022 Uzbekistan Futsal League champions	5th
Thailand	Port FC	2022 Futsal Thai League champions	2nd
United Arab Emirates	Al Ain FC	2022 Futsal UAE League champions	1st
Qatar	Al Rayyan SC		
Iraq			
Indonesia			

== Squads ==
Each team has to submit a squad of 14 players, including a minimum of two goalkeepers.
