= Ghodrat Bahadori =

Iranian futsal player and coach (born 1990)

Personal information
- Full name: Ghodrat Bahadori
- Date of birth: 4 February 1990 (age 36)
- Place of birth: Mashhad, Iran
- Height: 1.74 m (5 ft 9 in)
- Position: Left winger

Team information
- Current team: Crop
- Number: 17

Youth career
- 2001–2008: Babak Khorasan (football)
- 2008–2010: Elmo Adab

Senior career*
| Years | Team | Apps | (Gls) |
| 2008–2010 | Elmo Adab | | |
| 2010–2012 | Firooz Sofeh | | (42) |
| 2012–2015 | Farsh Ara | | (43) |
| 2015–2016 | Tasisat Daryaei | | (8) |
| 2016 | Naft Al Wasat | 6 | (6) |
| 2016–2017 | Farsh Ara | | (9) |
| 2017 | Naft Al Wasat | | |
| 2017–2018 | Farsh Ara | | (6) |
| 2018 | Naft Al Wasat | | |
| 2018–2019 | Shenzhen Nanling | | |
| 2019–2020 | Farsh Ara | | (16) |
| 2020–2021 | Giti Pasand | | (14) |
| 2021 | Naft Al Wasat | | |
| 2021–2023 | Farsh Ara | | (9) |
| 2023– | Crop | | (0) |

International career^{‡}
- Iran U20
- Iran U23
| | Iran | 60 | (40) |

Managerial career
- 2021–2023: Farsh Ara (Player-coach)
- * Club domestic league appearances and goals as of 15 September 2023 ‡ National team caps and goals as of 16 October 2020

Ghodrat Bahadori (Persian: قدرت بهادری; born 4 February 1990) is an Iranian professional futsal coach and player. He is currently a member of Crop in the Iranian Futsal Super League.

== Honours ==
=== Country ===
- FIFA Futsal World Cup
  - Third place (1): 2016
- AFC Futsal Championship
  - Champion (1): 2016
  - Runners-up (1): 2014
- Asian Indoor and Martial Arts Games
  - Champion (1): 2013
- WAFF Futsal Championship
  - Champion (1): 2012
- Grand Prix
  - Runner-Up (1): 2015

=== Club ===
- AFC Futsal Club Championship
  - Champion (1): 2015 (Tasisat Daryaei)
  - Runner-Up (1): 2016 (Naft Al Wasat)
- Iranian Futsal Super League
  - Champion (1): 2015–16 (Tasisat Daryaei)
  - Runner-Up (1): 2020–21 (Giti Pasand)
- Iraq Futsal League champions
  - Champion (3): 2015–16 (Naft Al Wasat) - 2016–17 (Naft Al Wasat) - 2017–18 (Naft Al Wasat)
