= Saeid Ahmadabbasi =

Iranian futsal player (born 1992)

Saeid Ahmad Abbasi
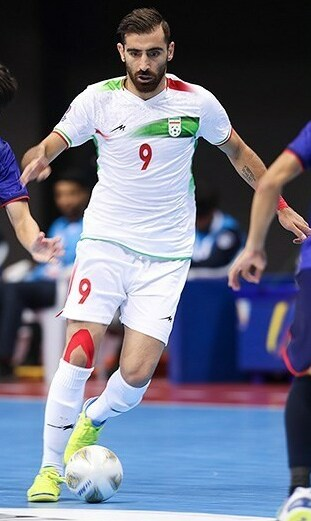
- Ahmadabbasi with Iran in 2022

Personal information
- Full name: Saeid Ahmadabbasi
- Date of birth: 31 July 1992 (age 34)
- Place of birth: Tonekabon, Iran
- Height: 1.81 m (5 ft 11 in)
- Position: Pivot

Team information
- Current team: Valdepeñas
- Number: 13

Senior career*
Years	Team	Apps	(Gls)
2012–2013	Milad		
2013–2017	Tasisat Daryaei		(36)
2017–2022	Giti Pasand		(147)
2022–	Valdepeñas	24	(9)

International career^{‡}
2017–	Iran		(45)
Medal record
Representing Iran
Men's Futsal as player
AFC Futsal Championship
Gold medal – first place	2018 Chinese Taipei
Gold medal – first place	2024 Thailand
Silver medal – second place	2022 Kuwait
AFC Futsal Asian Cup
Gold medal – first place	2026 Indonesia
Asian Indoor and Martial Arts Games
Gold medal – first place	2017 Ashgabat
- * Club domestic league appearances and goals as of 8 July 2023 ‡ National team caps and goals as of 18 September 2022

Saeid Ahmad Abbasi (Persian: سعید احمدعباسی; born 31 July 1992) is an Iranian professional futsal player. He is currently a member of Viña Albali Valdepeñas in the Primera División de Futsal.

== Honours ==
=== International ===
- AFC Futsal Championship
  - Champion (2): 2018, 2024
  - Runner-up (1): 2022
- Asian Indoor and Martial Arts Games
  - Champion (1): 2017

=== Club ===
- AFC Futsal Club Championship
  - Champion (1): 2015 (Tasisat Daryaei)
  - Runner-Up (1): 2017 (Giti Pasand)
- Iranian Futsal Super League
  - Champion (2): 2014–15 (Tasisat Daryaei) - 2015–16 (Tasisat Daryaei)
  - Runner-Up (3): 2018–19 (Giti Pasand) - 2019–20 (Giti Pasand) - 2020–21 (Giti Pasand)

=== Individual ===
- AFC Futsaler of the Year: 2023
- Iranian Futsal Super League top scorer (1): 2020–21 (Giti Pasand) (26 goals)

== International goals ==
No.	Date	Venue	Opponent	Score	Result	Competition
1.	12 March 2017	Shiraz, Iran	Iraq	4–?	9–3	Friendly
2.	12 March 2017	Shiraz, Iran	Iraq	5–?	9–3	Friendly
3.	12 March 2017	Shiraz, Iran	Iraq	6–?	9–3	Friendly
4.	18 September 2017	Ashgabat, Turkmenistan	Tahiti	4–0	16–1	2017 Asian Indoor and Martial Arts Games
5.	21 September 2017	Ashgabat, Turkmenistan	Kyrgyzstan	1–0	10–0	2017 Asian Indoor and Martial Arts Games
6.	21 September 2017	Ashgabat, Turkmenistan	Kyrgyzstan	2–0	10–0	2017 Asian Indoor and Martial Arts Games
7.	21 September 2017	Ashgabat, Turkmenistan	Kyrgyzstan	4–0	10–0	2017 Asian Indoor and Martial Arts Games
8.	21 September 2017	Ashgabat, Turkmenistan	Kyrgyzstan	5–0	10–0	2017 Asian Indoor and Martial Arts Games
9.	21 September 2017	Ashgabat, Turkmenistan	Kyrgyzstan	8–0	10–0	2017 Asian Indoor and Martial Arts Games
10.	24 September 2017	Ashgabat, Turkmenistan	Afghanistan	4–0	10–2	2017 Asian Indoor and Martial Arts Games
11.	15 October 2017	Tabriz, Iran	Afghanistan	6–1	8–2	2018 AFC Futsal Championship qualification
12.	17 October 2017	Tabriz, Iran	Tajikistan	11–1	12–2	2018 AFC Futsal Championship qualification
13.	2 February 2018	Taipei, Taiwan	Myanmar	12–0	14–0	2018 AFC Futsal Championship
14.	23 September 2018	Tabriz, Iran	Belarus	1–1	3–1	Friendly
15.	4 February 2019	Loznica, Serbia	Serbia	1–?	6–3	Friendly
16.	4 February 2019	Loznica, Serbia	Serbia	5–?	6–3	Friendly
17.	4 February 2019	Loznica, Serbia	Serbia	6–?	6–3	Friendly
18.	1 December 2019	Mashhad, Iran	Slovakia	?–?	5–5	Friendly
