= Farsh Ara Mashhad FSC =

Iranian futsal club

Farsh Ara
- Full name: Farsh Ara Mashhad Futsal Club
- Founded: 1994; 31 years ago
- Ground: Shahid Beheshti Indoor Stadium, Mashhad
- Capacity: 6,000
- Owner: Ara Carpet Company
- Chairman: Reza Salar
- Head coach: Mohsen Hassanzadeh
- League: Iranian Futsal Super League
- 2022–23: 10th of 14
| Home colours | Away colours |

Farsh Ara Futsal Club (Persian: باشگاه فوتسال فرش آرا, Bashgah-e Futsal-e Fersh-e Âra) is an Iranian professional Futsal club based in Mashhad.

== Season to season ==
The table below chronicles the achievements of the Club in various competitions.

| Season | League | Position | Hazfi | Notes |
|---|---|---|---|---|
| 2006–07 | 2nd Division | ?? |
| 2007–08 | 2nd Division | ?? |
| 2008–09 | 1st Division | 5th | | bought Azar Aab licence |
| 2009–10 | 1st Division | 3rd / Group A |
| 2010–11 | 1st Division | 2nd / Group A |
| 2011–12 | Super League | 8th | | hired Elmo Adab in half season |
| 2012–13 | Super League | 8th |
| 2013–14 | Super League | 7th | 1/4 Final |
| 2014–15 | Super League | 7th |
| 2015–16 | Super League | 11th |
| 2016–17 | Super League | 9th |
| 2017–18 | Super League | 6th |
| 2018–19 | Super League | 5th |
| 2019–20 | Super League | 5th |
| 2020–21 | Super League | 4th |
| 2021–22 | Super League | 7th |
| 2022–23 | Super League | 10th |
| 2023–24 | Super League |

Last updated: 15 September 2023

| Champions | Runners-up | Third Place | Fourth Place | Relegation | Promoted | Did not qualify | not held |

== Players ==
=== Current squad ===
As of 16 September 2023

| # | Position | Name | Nationality |
|---|---|---|---|
| 2 | Goalkeeper | Mohammad Ali Niknam | (Iran) |
| 4 | | Ahmad Reza Hassanpour | (Iran) |
| 6 | Winger | Hamid Ghahremani | (Iran) |
| 7 | Winger | Hamed Abdollahi | (Iran) |
| 8 | | Meysam Barmshouri | (Iran) |
| 9 | Defender | Vahid Nadri | (Iran) |
| 10 | Winger | Saeid Sarvari | (Iran) |
| 11 | | Sina Asadi | (Iran) |
| 13 | | Abdolghaffar Sadeghi | (Afghanistan) |
| 16 | | Mohammad Komeil Jahedi | (Iran) |
| 20 | | Bahman Gorgij | (Afghanistan) |
| 24 | | Sina Khadembashi | (Iran) |
| 29 | | Majid Lashani | (Iran) |
| 33 | | Mohammad Fathabadi | (Iran) |
| 69 | Goalkeeper | Amir Hossein Torabzadeh | (Iran) |
| 70 | | Farzad Mahmoudi | (Afghanistan) |
| 72 | Goalkeeper | Hamed Sanaei | (Iran) |
| 78 | | Sajjad Amani | (Iran) |
| 82 | | Sajjad Adelipour | (Iran) |
| | | Hamid Reza Hosseini | (Afghanistan) |
| | Goalkeeper | Yasser Karami | (Iran) |
| | | Mehrdad Hatefi Fard | (Iran) |

=== Notable players ===
- (Iran) Ghodrat Bahadori
- (Iran) Mostafa Tayyebi
- (Iran) Farhad Tavakoli
- (Iran) Mohsen Hassanzadeh
- (Iran) Majid Latifi
- (Iran) Meysam Ilanlou
- (Iran) Esmaeil Abbasian
- (Iran) Mohammad Beyzaeinejad
- (Iran) Bagher Mohammadi
- (Iran) Hashem Farajzadeh
- (Iran) Saeid Sarvari
- (Iran) Majid Khazaei
- (Iran) Bahman Jafari
- (Iran) Shahram Sharifzadeh
- (Iran) Soroush Ahmadnia
- (Iran) Nasser Ajam
- (Iran) Abdolrahman Sarani
- (Iran) Ali As'adi
- (Iran) Hamed Abdollahi
- (Iran) Ali Abdollahi
- (Iran) Amir Raeisi
- (Iran) Ebrahim Hajati
- (Iran) Masoud Saadati
- (Iran) Hadi Ahmadi
- (Afghanistan) Mohammad Reza Karimi
- (Afghanistan) Hamid Reza Hosseini
- (Afghanistan) Akbar Kazemi
- (Afghanistan) Farzad Mahmoudi
- (Afghanistan) Bahman Gorgij
- (Afghanistan) Abdolghaffar Sadeghi

== Personnel ==
=== Current technical staff ===
| Position | Name |
|---|---|
| Head coach | (Iran) Mohsen Hassanzadeh |
| Assistant coaches | (Iran) Ahmad Shafiei Fard (Iran) Hossein Hassanzadeh |
| Goalkeeping coach | (Iran) Reza Rouhbakhsh |
| Fitness coach | (Iran) Vahdat Boghrabadi |
| Team manager | (Iran) Alireza Mortezaei |
| Doctor | (Iran) Hassan Nekouei |
| Procurment | (Iran) Amir Hossein Arab Esmaeili |

Last updated: 16 September 2023

== Club officials ==
| Position | Name |
|---|---|
| Owner | |
| Chairman | (Iran) Reza Salar |
| Vice-chairman | |
| Consultant of chairman | |
| Chairman of the board | (Iran) Gholam Ali Mortezaei |
| Members of the board | (Iran) Ahmad Jebelli |

Last updated: 9 November 2022
