= Raga F.C. =

Iranian futsal club

Raga
- Full name: Raga Shahr-e Rey Futsal Club
- Founded: 2019
- Dissolved: 7 May 2022
- Ground: Ayatollah Taleghani Indoor Stadium, Ray
- Capacity: 500
Home colours	Away colours

Raga Shahr-e Rey Futsal Club (Persian: باشگاه فوتسال راگا شهرری, Bashgah-e Futsal-e Raga-ye Shiherri) was an Iranian professional futsal club based in Ray.

== History ==
The club was founded in 2019 as Foodka Tehran. In the season of 2020–21 Iranian Futsal Super League it was renamed Raga Shahr-e Rey due to change of sponsorship.

== Season to season ==
The table below chronicles the achievements of the Club in various competitions.

Season	League									Leagues top goalscorer	
Season	Division	P	W	D	L	GF	GA	Pts	Pos	Name	Goals
2019–20	1st Division	18	9	5	4	57	42	32	2nd / group B		
2019–20	Play Off	3	2	1	0	9	4	7	1st		
2020–21	Super league	Renamed Raga Shahr-e Rey								Hamid Reza Rahanjam	14
2020–21	Super league	12	4	2	6	29	32	14	8th	Hamid Reza Rahanjam	14
2021–22	Super league	26	6	2	18	39	73	20	12th	Mehdi Asadshir	7
1st Division total		21	11	6	4	66	46	39			
Super league total		38	10	4	24	68	105	34			
Total		59	21	10	28	134	151	73			

Last updated: 16 March 2022

Notes:
* unofficial titles
1 worst title in history of club

Key

- P = Played
- W = Games won
- D = Games drawn
- L = Games lost
- GF = Goals for
- GA = Goals against
- Pts = Points
- Pos = Final position

Champions	Runners-up	Third Place	Fourth Place	Relegation	Promoted	Did not qualify	not held

== Honours ==
- Iran Futsal's 1st Division

Winners (1): 2019–20

== Players ==
=== Club captains ===
#	Name	Captaincy
1	(Iran) Mousa Hassan Doust	2019–2020
2	(Iran) Mohammad Keshavarz	2020–2021
3	(Iran) Mohammad Esmaeil Vatankhah	2021
4	(Iran) Meysam Nouri	2021–2022

== Managers ==
Last updated: 6 September 2022

Name	Nat	From	To	Record				
Name	Nat	From	To	M	W	D	L	Win %
Saeid Abdolvand	(Iran)	September 2019	October 2019	2	0	1	1	0.00
Hossein Norouzi	(Iran)	October 2019	December 2019	6	3	3	0	50.00
Reza Zarkhanli	(Iran)	December 2019	September 2020	13	8	2	3	61.54
Mohammad Keshavarz	(Iran)	September 2020	May 2021	12	4	2	6	33.33
Kazem Sadeghi	(Iran)	October 2021	November 2021	8	2	0	6	25.00
Mohammad Javad Rezaei	(Iran)	November 2021	January 2022	9	3	0	6	33.33
Mahdi Golpour	(Iran)	January 2022	March 2022	7	1	2	4	14.29
