= Hamid Reza Abrarinia =

Iranian futsal player and coach (born 1978)

Personal information
- Full name: Hamid Reza Abrarinia
- Date of birth: 29 September 1978 (age 48)
- Place of birth: Tehran, Iran
- Position: Goalkeeper

Team information
- Current team: Giti Pasand (goalkeeping coach)

Senior career*
Years	Team	Apps	(Gls)
- Sadra
–2012	Foolad Mahan		
2013–2014	Dabiri		
2015–2017	Arjan		

International career^{‡}
- Iran

Managerial career
- 2021: Iman
- 2021–: Giti Pasand (goalkeeping coach)
- * Club domestic league appearances and goals as of July 8, 2021 ‡ National team caps and goals as of October 24, 2010

Hamid Reza Abrarinia (Persian: حمیدرضا ابراری‌نیا; born 29 September 1978) is an Iranian professional futsal coach and former player. He is currently goalkeeping coach of Giti Pasand in the Iranian Futsal Super League.

== Honours ==
=== Country ===
- AFC Futsal Championship
  - Champions (6): 2002 - 2003 - 2004 - 2005 - 2008 - 2010

=== Club ===
- AFC Futsal Club Championship
  - Champion (1): 2010 (Foolad Mahan)
- Iranian Futsal Super League
  - Champion (3): 2008–09 (Foolad Mahan) - 2009–10 (Foolad Mahan) - 2013–14 (Dabiri)
