= Ghand Katrin F.C. =

Iranian futsal club

Ghand Katrin
- Full name: Ghand Katrin Amol Futsal Club
- Founded: 7 May 2022; 4 years ago
- Ground: Payambar Azam Arena
- Capacity: 2,100
- Owner: Alireza Amini
- Chairman: Alireza Amini
- Head coach: Javad Asghari Moghaddam
- League: Iranian Futsal Super League
- Website: http://www.katrinco.ir/

Ghand Katrin Amol Futsal Club (Persian: باشگاه فوتسال قند کاترین آمل) is an Iranian professional futsal club based in Amol. It currently plays in the Iranian Futsal Super League

== Players ==
=== Current squad ===
As of 11 December 2022

#	Position	Name	Nationality
2	Goalkeeper	Abolfazl Heidari	(Iran)
3	Goalkeeper	Bagher Mohammadi	(Iran)
4		Mehdi Gholizadeh	(Iran)
6	Right flank	Amirhossein Zeinali	(Iran)
7	Flank	Reza Abgoun	(Iran)
8		Mohammad Taghi Alizadeh	(Iran)
9		Mahdi Dehghannejad	(Iran)
12	Goalkeeper	Farhad Ebrahimi	(Iran)
13	Left flank	Saeid Taghizadeh	(Iran)
14		Amir Reza Khounjahan	(Iran)
15	Left flank	Abdolrahman Sarani	(Iran)
19	Left flank	Masoud Abbasi	(Iran)
20		Sadegh Zivari	(Iran)
24		Alireza Yaghoubi	(Iran)
	Pivot	Eshagh Sourghali	(Iran)
	Pivot	Mohammad Geravand	(Iran)

== Personnel ==
=== Current technical staff ===
Position	Name
Head coach	(Iran) Javad Asghari Moghaddam
Assistant coaches	(Iran) Ali Akbar Amini (Iran) Khosro Amiri
Goalkeeping coach	(Iran) Morteza Mansour Samaei
Fitness coach	(Iran) Shahriar Nasr Esfahani
Supervisor	(Iran) Mostafa Ghanbarizadeh
Doctor	(Iran) Amirhossein Nouranian
Procurmentes	(Iran) Masoud Ehsanifar (Iran) Hesam Daryabari

Last updated: 29 August 2022

== Managers ==
Last updated: 29 August 2022

Name	Nat	From	To	Record				
Name	Nat	From	To	M	W	D	L	Win %
Reza Kordi	(Iran)	May 2022	August 2022	5	0	1	4	0.00
Javad Asghari Moghaddam	(Iran)	August 2022	Present	3	2	0	1	66.67
