= Foolad Zarand F.C. =

Iranian futsal club

Foolad Zarand
- Full name: Foolad Zarand Iranian Futsal Club
- Ground: Azad University Indoor Stadium, Zarand
- Capacity: 19,000
- Owner: Zarand Iranian Steel Company
- Chairman: Mahdi Maher
- Head coach: Aminollah Paymard
- League: Iranian Futsal Super League
- 2021–22: 6th of 14
Home colours	Away colours

Foolad Zarand Iranian Futsal Club (Persian: باشگاه فوتسال فولاد زرند ایرانیان) is an Iranian professional futsal club based in Zarand.

== Season to season ==
The table below chronicles the achievements of the Club in various competitions.

Season	League									Leagues top goalscorer	
Season	Division	P	W	D	L	GF	GA	Pts	Pos	Name	Goals
2017–18	2nd Division	10	3	5	2	29	24	14	2nd / Group 4		
2017–18	Play Off	3	1	0	2	5	9	3	3rd / Group C		
2018–19	2nd Division	10	8	1	1	27	11	25	1st / Group 5		
2018–19	Play Off	5	2	0	3	17	11	6	4th / Group A		
2020–21	1st Division	12	6	4	2	29	17	22	2nd / Group A	Hossein Akbarzadeh	14
2020–21	Play Off	7	3	2	2	25	20	11	2nd	Hossein Akbarzadeh	14
2021–22	Super league	26	10	4	12	67	72	34	6th	Kambiz Gomroki	19
2nd Division total		28	14	6	8	78	55	48			
1st Division total		19	9	6	4	54	37	33			
Super league total		26	10	4	12	67	72	34			
Total		73	33	16	24	199	164	115			

Last updated: 16 March 2022

Notes:
* unofficial titles
1 worst title in history of club

Key

- P = Played
- W = Games won
- D = Games drawn
- L = Games lost
- GF = Goals for
- GA = Goals against
- Pts = Points
- Pos = Final position

Champions	Runners-up	Third Place	Fourth Place	Relegation	Promoted	Did not qualify	not held

== Honours ==
- Iran Futsal's 1st Division

Runners-up (1): 2020–21

== Players ==
=== Current squad ===
As of 7 December 2022

#	Position	Name	Nationality
2	Goalkeeper	Mojtaba Nemati	(Iran)
4		Amir Hossein Gholami	(Iran)
5	Winger	Ahmad Ebrahimi	(Iran)
8		Davoud Khosravi Saadi	(Iran)
10	Pivot	Hossein Akbarzadeh	(Iran)
13		Ali Izadi	(Iran)
14		Amir Moradi	(Iran)
15	Winger	Amin Nasrollahzadeh	(Iran)
20	Pivot	Kambiz Gomroki	(Iran)
21		Javad Mohammadi	(Iran)
23	Goalkeeper	Sajjad Babaei	(Iran)
77	Defender	Mostafa Ahmadi	(Iran)
80		Mohammad Yaghinlou	(Iran)
90	Goalkeeper	Amir Hossein Rezaei	(Iran)
	Winger	Hashem Shirali	(Iran)
		Reza Ramezani	(Iran)
		Alireza Shirazi	(Iran)

== Personnel ==
=== Current technical staff ===
Position	Name
Head coach	(Iran) Aminollah Paymard
Assistant coaches	(Iran) Iman Abdollahi (Iran) Hossein Mirhosseini
Fitness coach	(Iran) Hassan Jafari
Goalkeeping coach	(Iran) Pouya Karim Nazar
Supervisor	(Iran) Mohammad Reza Zamani
Doctor	(Iran) Vahid Rahmani
Procurment	(Iran) Javad Momeni
Media director	(Iran) Milad Izadi

Last updated: 6 September 2022

== Managers ==
Last updated: 29 August 2022

Name	Nat	From	To	Record				
Name	Nat	From	To	M	W	D	L	Win %
Iman Abdollahi	(Iran)	February 2021	July 2021	19	9	6	4	47.37
Reza Kordi	(Iran)	July 2021	March 2022	26	10	4	12	38.46
Aminollah Paymard	(Iran)	May 2022	Present	8	3	0	5	37.50
