= Moghavemat Shahrekord FSC =

Iranian futsal club

Moghavemat Shahrekord مقاومت شهرکرد
- Full name: Moghavemat Basij Shahrekord Futsal Club
- Ground: Shahid Beheshti Arena; Shahrekord
- 2013: 9th/Group B

Moghavemat Basij Shahrekord Futsal Club (Persian: باشگاه فوتسال مقاومت بسیج شهرکرد) is an Iranian futsal club based in Shahrekord, Iran. They currently compete in the Iran Futsal's 2nd Division, the 3rd tier of Iranian futsal.

== Season-by-season ==
The table below chronicles the achievements of the Club in various competitions.

Season	League	Position	Notes
2002-03	Premiere League	?
2003-04	Super League	11th	Relegation to Play Off
2004-05	Super League	13th	Relegation
2006-07	1st Division	?
2007-08	1st Division	?
2008-09	1st Division	?	Relegation
2010	2nd Division	?
2011	2nd Division	6th/Group B
2012	2nd Division	5th/Group B
2013	2nd Division	9th/Group B	Relegation

== Famous players ==
- (Iran) Mostafa Nazari
