= Ahmad Baghbanbashi =

Iranian futsal player

Personal information
- Full name: Ahmad Baghbanbashi Doust
- Date of birth: 31 March 1972 (age 54)
- Place of birth: Isfahan, Iran
- Position: Forward

Youth career
- Daraei Isfahan (football)
- Tam

Senior career*
| Years | Team | Apps | (Gls) |
| 1990–1991 | Sepahan | | |
| 1991–1995 | Fath Isfahan (football) | | |
| 1995–2002 | Sepahan | | |
| 2002–2003 | Zob Ahan | | |
| 2004–2005 | Esteghlal | | |
| 2005–2007 | Post | | |
| 2007–2011 | Foolad Mahan | | |

International career^{‡}
| | Iran | | (30) |

Managerial career
- 2011: Foolad Mahan Novin
- 2011: Firooz Sofeh
- 2011–2012: Foolad Mahan Novin
- 2012–2013: Nik Andish Shahrdari
- 2013–2014: Kashi Nilou
- 2014–2015: Kashi Nilou (assistant)
- 2015: Bank Resalat
- 2017: Giti Pasand (assistant)
- 2019–2020: Mes Sungun (assistant)
- 2020–2021: Mes Sungun
- 2021–2022: Sepahan
- * Club domestic league appearances and goals as of 6 September 2022 ‡ National team caps and goals as of 8 January 2015

Ahmad Baghbanbashi Doust (Persian: احمد باغبانباشی دوست; born 31 March 1972) is an Iranian professional futsal coach and former player.

== Honours ==
=== Player ===
==== Country ====
- AFC Futsal Championship
  - Champion (2): 1999 - 2000

==== Club ====
- AFC Futsal Club Championship
  - Champion (1): 2010 (Foolad Mahan)
- Iranian Futsal Super League
  - Champion (2): 2008–09 (Foolad Mahan) - 2009–10 (Foolad Mahan)

=== Manager ===
- Iranian Futsal Super League
  - Champion (1): 2020–21 (Mes Sungun)
- Iran Futsal's 2nd Division
  - Champion (1): 2011 (Foolad Mahan Novin)
