= Reza Zarkhanli =

Iranian futsal player and coach

Personal information
- Full name: Reza Zarkhanli
- Date of birth: 22 March 1973 (age 53)

Team information
- Current team: Safir Gofteman (manager)

Senior career*
Years	Team	Apps	(Gls)
1996–1997	Entezam (football)		
- Pas

International career^{‡}
- Iran

Managerial career
- 2010–2012: Misagh
- Bank Shahr
- 2014–2016: Shahid Mansouri (assistant)
- 2016: Shahrdari Neka
- 2016–2019: Moghavemat Qarchak
- 2019–2020: Foodka
- 2020–2021: Arvin Gala Maku
- 2021: Iralco Arak
- 2021–2022: Ana Sanat
- 2022–: Safir Gofteman
- * Club domestic league appearances and goals as of 30 October 2022 ‡ National team caps and goals as of 1 December 2016

Reza Zarkhanli (Persian: رضا زرخانلی; born 22 March 1973) is an Iranian professional futsal coach and former player. He is currently head coach of Safir Gofteman in the Iranian Futsal Super League.

== Honours ==
=== Managerial ===
- Iran Futsal's 1st Division
  - Champions (3): 2010–11 (Misagh) - 2016–17 (Moghavemat Qarchak) - 2019–20 (Foodka)
