= Sunich Saveh FSC =

Iranian futsal club

Sunich
- Full name: Sunich Saveh Futsal Club
- Founded: 2001; 24 years ago
- Ground: Fajr-e Felestin Hall
- Capacity: 2,500
- Owner: Alifard company
- Chairman: Davoud Bagheri
- Head coach: Javad Asghari Moghaddam
- League: Iranian Futsal Super League
- 2022–23: 4th of 14
Away colours

Sunich Saveh Futsal Club (Persian: باشگاه فوتسال سن ایچ ساوه, Bashgah-e Futsal-e Sin-e Ayece-ye Saveh) is an Iranian professional futsal club based in Saveh.

The club was founded in 2001 and held its home matches in Fajr-e Felestin Hall, which has a capacity of 2,500 persons.

== Season to season ==
The table below chronicles the achievements of the Club in various competitions.

Season	League	Position	Notes
2013–14	2nd Division	2nd / Group C
2014–15	2nd Division	4th / Group South-East
2015–16	1st Division	2nd / Group A
2016–17	1st Division	1st / Group B
2017–18	1st Division	1st / Group A	Promoted Play Off
2018–19	Super League	6th
2019–20	Super League	4th
2020–21	Super League	3rd
2021–22	Super League	5th
2022–23	Super League	4th

Last updated: 14 March 2023

Champions	Runners-up	Third Place	Fourth Place	Relegation	Promoted	Did not qualify	not held

== Honours ==
- Iran Futsal's 1st Division

Winners (1): 2017–18

== Players ==
=== Current squad ===
As of 7 December 2022

#	Position	Name	Nationality
1	Goalkeeper	Amirhossein Sabouhi	(Iran)
2	Goalkeeper	Alireza Sedigh	(Iran)
5		Mehdi Ameri	(Iran)
6	Defender	Mehdi Asadshir	(Iran)
7	Pivot	Reza Sepandar	(Iran)
8	Winger	Shahab Basharidoust	(Iran)
9	Defender	Vahid Nadri	(Iran)
10	Pivot	Pejman Bahadivand	(Iran)
16		Mohammad Nassiri	(Iran)
17	Pivot	Ruhollah Isari	(Iran)
19	Winger	Farshid Naderi	(Iran)
23		Taleb Arabpour	(Iran)
25	Goalkeeper	Sina Parkas	(Iran)
27		Mohammad Hossein Beyrami	(Iran)
78		Mohammad Hadi Monajjemi	(Iran)
	Left flank	Amir Mohammad Otadi	(Iran)
		Kianoush Shirpour	(Iran)

== Personnel ==
=== Current technical staff ===
Position	Name
Head coach	(Iran) Javad Asghari Moghaddam
Goalkeeping coach	(Iran) Morteza Mansour Samaei
Fitness coach	(Iran) Hossein Ganjian
Supervisor	(Iran) Hamid Taheri
Doctor	(Iran) Reza Rakhshmah
Masseur	(Iran) Sajjad Barghi
Procurment	(Iran) Arash Bahrami
Media director	(Iran) Amirhossein Mirsalehi
Administration manager	(Iran) Arash Taheri
Head of academy	(Iran) Artin Cheraghi

Last updated: 7 December 2022
