= Javad Asghari Moghaddam =

Iranian futsal player and coach

Personal information
- Full name: Javad Asghari Moghaddam
- Date of birth: 12 August 1979 (age 47)
- Place of birth: Ramsar, Iran
- Height: 1.79 m (5 ft 10 in)
- Position: Winger

Team information
- Current team: Ghand Katrin (manager)

Senior career*
Years	Team	Apps	(Gls)
- Milad
- Zoghalsang
- Post
- Foolad Mahan
- Firooz Sofeh
–2012	Foolad Mahan		
2012–2017	Dabiri		(76)
2017–2018	Tasisat Daryaei		(0)
2018–2019	Sunich		(6)

International career^{‡}
2004–2012	Iran		

Managerial career
- 2014–2017: Dabiri (unofficial)
- 2018–2021: Sunich
- 2021: Zandi Beton (technical manager)
- 2021: Crop
- 2022–: Ghand Katrin
- * Club domestic league appearances and goals as of 11 August 2022 ‡ National team caps and goals as of 27 July 2018

Javad Asghari Moghaddam (Persian: جواد اصغری‌مقدم; born 12 August 1979) is an Iranian professional futsal coach and former player. He is currently head coach of Ghand Katrin in the Iranian Futsal Super League.

== Honours ==
=== Country ===
- AFC Futsal Championship
  - Champion (3): 2007 - 2008 - 2010
- Confederations Cup
  - Champion (1): 2009
- WAFF Futsal Championship
  - Champion (1): 2012

=== Club ===
- AFC Futsal Club Championship
  - Champion (1): 2010 (Foolad Mahan)
  - Third place (1): 2014 (Dabiri)
- Iranian Futsal Super League
  - Champions (1): 2013–14 (Dabiri)
  - Runners-up (2): 2016–17 (Dabiri) - 2017–18 (Tasisat Daryaei)

=== Manager ===
- Iranian Futsal Super League
  - Runners-up (1): 2016–17 (Dabiri)

=== Individual ===
- Top Goalscorer:
  - WAFF Futsal Championship: 2012 (8 goals)
