= Reza Lak Aliabadi =

Iranian futsal player and coach

Personal information
- Full name: Reza Lak Aliabadi
- Date of birth: 15 April 1976 (age 50)
- Place of birth: Tehran, Iran

Team information
- Current team: Crop (manager)

Senior career*
| Years | Team | Apps | (Gls) |
- Keshavarz
- Shohada Basij
- Rah Ahan
| 2007–2008 | Shensa | | |
- Shahid Mansouri

International career^{‡}
- Iran

Managerial career
- Shohada Basij
- Rah Ahan
- 2007–2008: Shensa (assistant)
- 2010–2013: Shahid Mansouri
- 2013: Iran (assistant)
- 2013–2014: Giti Pasand
- 2014–2015: Misagh
- 2015–2017: Giti Pasand
- 2017–2018: Shahrdari Saveh
- 2018–2019: Giti Pasand
- 2019–2020: Shahrvand
- 2020–2021: Crop
- 2021: Shahrvand (technical manager)
- 2021–2022: Zandi Beton
- 2022–: Crop
- * Club domestic league appearances and goals as of 6 September 2022 ‡ National team caps and goals as of 5 May 2018

Reza Lak Aliabadi (Persian: رضا لک علی‌آبادی; born 15 April 1976) is an Iranian professional futsal coach and former player. He is currently head coach of Crop in the Iranian Futsal Super League.

== Honours ==
=== Managerial Club ===
- Iranian Futsal Super League
  - Champion (3): 2010–11 (Shahid Mansouri) – 2011–12 (Shahid Mansouri) – 2016–17 (Giti Pasand)
  - Runner-Up (1): 2013–14 (Giti Pasand)
  - Third-Place (2): 2005–06 (Rah Ahan) – 2012–13 (Shahid Mansouri)
- AFC Futsal Club Championship
  - Runner-Up (1): 2011 (Shahid Mansouri) – 2013 (Giti Pasand)

=== Individual ===
- Best Manager
  - Iranian Futsal Super League: 2016–17 (Giti Pasand)
