= Zandi Beton F.C. =

Iranian futsal club

Zandi Beton
- Full name: Zandi Beton Kelardasht Futsal Club
- Founded: 2017; 9 years ago
- Ground: Besat Indoor Stadium, Kelardasht
- Owner: Saber Zandi
- Chairman: Saber Zandi
- Head coach: Mohammad Javad Rezaei
- League: Iranian Futsal Super League
- 2021–22: 9th of 14
Home colours	Away colours

Zandi Beton Kelardasht Futsal Club (Persian: باشگاه فوتسال زندی بتن کلاردشت) is an Iranian professional futsal club based in Kelardasht.

== Season to season ==
The table below chronicles the achievements of the Club in various competitions.

Season	League									Leagues top goalscorer	
Season	Division	P	W	D	L	GF	GA	Pts	Pos	Name	Goals
2017–18	Mazandaran league	24	18	2	4	95	45	56	1st		
2018–19	Local league	5	4	1	0	32	18	13	1st / Group 2		
2018–19	Play Off	5	4	1	0	33	23	13	2nd		
2019–20	2nd Division	6	4	1	1	23	16	13	1st / Group 2	Saman Ghazvinipour	13
2019–20	Play Off	10	5	1	4	40	31	16	3rd / Group A	Saman Ghazvinipour	13
2020–21	1st Division	10	6	2	2	23	16	20	2nd / Group D	Ali Aghaahmadi	11
2020–21	Play Off	7	4	2	1	33	20	14	1st	Ali Aghaahmadi	11
2021–22	Super league	26	8	3	15	78	82	27	9th	Abdolrahman Sarani	13
Mazandaran league total		24	18	2	4	95	45	56			
Local league total		10	8	2	0	65	41	26			
2nd Division total		16	9	2	5	63	47	29			
1st Division total		17	10	4	3	56	36	34			
Super league total		26	8	3	15	78	82	27			
Total		93	53	13	27	357	251	172			

Last updated: 16 March 2022

Notes:
* unofficial titles
1 worst title in history of club

Key

- P = Played
- W = Games won
- D = Games drawn
- L = Games lost
- GF = Goals for
- GA = Goals against
- Pts = Points
- Pos = Final position

Champions	Runners-up	Third Place	Fourth Place	Relegation	Promoted	Did not qualify	not held

== Honours ==
- Iran Futsal's 1st Division

Winners (1): 2020–21

- Local league

Runners-up (1): 2018–19

- Mazandaran league

Winners (1): 2017–18

== Players ==
=== Current squad ===
As of 9 December 2022

#	Position	Name	Nationality
2		Reza Esmaeilzadeh	(Iran)
4	Winger	Miramid Madani	(Iran)
5	Goalkeeper	Alireza Hamdollahi	(Iran)
6		Mehdi Ahangari	(Iran)
7		Mohsen Lotfi	(Iran)
8		Ali Aghaahmadi	(Iran)
9		Mohammad Reza Kord	(Iran)
10		Saman Ghazvinipour	(Iran)
11		Ali Esmaeili	(Iran)
14		Mahmoud Mahmoudi	(Iran)
15		Abolfazl Afzali	(Iran)
16	Goalkeeper	Amir Hossein Nasserkhanlou	(Iran)
17		Ali Khodadadi	(Iran)
19		Akbar Kazemi	(Afghanistan)
20		Manouchehr Zahedi	(Iran)
24		Nasser Ajam	(Iran)
31		Kiarash Taherinejad	(Iran)
77	Goalkeeper	Saeid Bali Eslami	(Iran)

== Personnel ==
=== Current technical staff ===
Position	Name
Head coach	(Iran) Mohammad Javad Rezaei
Assistant coach	(Iran) Yaser Zandi
Supervisor	(Iran) Mostafa Rangraz
Procurment	(Iran) Mohammad Javad Hosseinpour
Media director	(Iran) Esmaeil Babaei Doust

Last updated: 9 December 2022

== Managers ==
Last updated: 9 December 2022

Name	Nat	From	To	Record				
Name	Nat	From	To	M	W	D	L	Win %
Ahmad Amani	(Iran)							
Ali Hemati	(Iran)	January 2021	March 2021	5	3	1	1	60.00
Ahmad Pariazar	(Iran)	March 2021	May 2021	5	3	1	1	60.00
Saeid Keshavarzi	(Iran)	May 2021	July 2021	7	4	2	1	57.14
Majid Raeisi	(Iran)	August 2021	November 2021	10	3	1	6	30.00
Reza Lak Aliabadi	(Iran)	November 2021	March 2022	15	5	2	8	33.33
Mehrdad Lotfi	(Iran)	July 2022	November 2022	13	4	4	5	30.77
Mohammad Javad Rezaei	(Iran)	November 2022	Present	3	1	0	2	33.33
