= Moghavemat Alborz FSC =

Iranian futsal club

Moghavemat Alborz
- Full name: Moghavemat Alborz Futsal Club
- Ground: Enghelab Eslami Indoor Stadium, Karaj
- Capacity: 2,500
- Owner: Basij
- Chairman: Rahim Esfandiyari Rad
- Head coach: Mehrdad Lotfi
- League: Iranian Futsal Super League
- 2021–22: 4th of 14
Home colours	Away colours

Moghavemat Alborz Futsal Club (Persian: باشگاه فوتسال مقاومت البرز, Bashgah-e Futsal-e Miqavâmit Alberz) is an Iranian professional futsal club based in Karaj.

== Crest ==
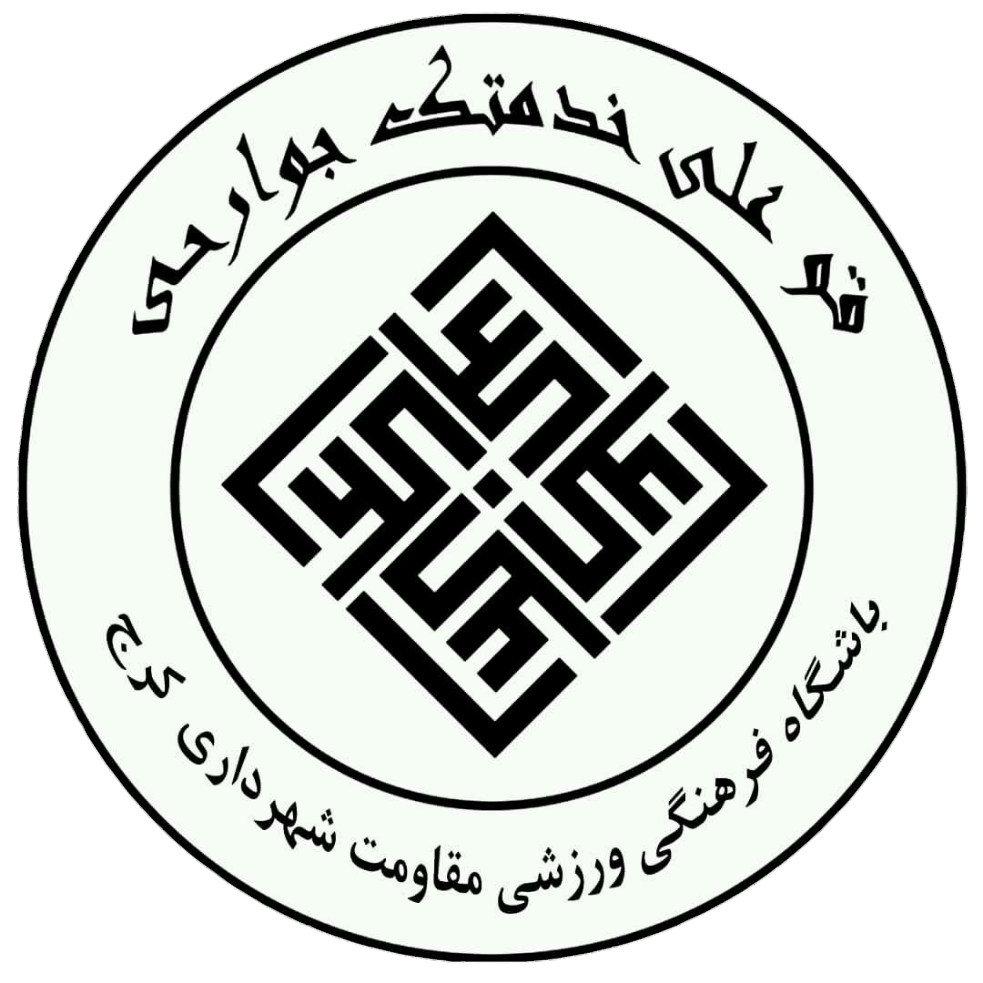
2019–2020

== Season to season ==
The table below chronicles the achievements of the Club in various competitions.

Season	League	Position	Hazfi	Notes
2011–12	2nd Division	12th Group A		Relegation
2012–13	2nd Division	1st Group A		Promoted Play Off
2013–14	1st Division	1st Group B	Withdrew	Promoted Play Off
2014–15	Super League	12th
2015–16	Super League	10th
2016–17	Super League	11th
2017–18	Super League	11th
2018–19	Super League	8th
2019–20	Super League	10th
2020–21	Super League	6th
2021–22	Super League	4th

Last updated: 15 July 2022

Champions	Runners-up	Third Place	Fourth Place	Relegation	Promoted	Did not qualify	not held

== Players ==
=== Current squad ===
As of 7 December 2022

#	Position	Name	Nationality
3	Goalkeeper	Ahmad Reza Khosravani	(Iran)
4	Defender	Mahdi Norouzi	(Afghanistan)
5		Mohammad Ebrahimian	(Iran)
6		Fakhraddin Mousavipour	(Iran)
8		Erfan Eiji Hosseinzadeh	(Iran)
10	Defender	Ehsan Soheili Moghaddam	(Iran)
11	Winger	Soheil Jamedi	(Iran)
15	Winger	Behrouz Azimi	(Iran)
16	Goalkeeper	Ali Rahimi	(Iran)
19	Winger	Ali Ebrahimi	(Iran)
21		Alireza Bohlouli	(Iran)
24		Ali Shirkouhi	(Iran)
44		Mansour Rafinia	(Iran)
61		Erfan Mohammadpour	(Iran)
82		Mobin Asadi	(Iran)
99		Hesamoddin Babaei	(Iran)

== Personnel ==
=== Current technical staff ===
Position	Name
Head coach	(Iran) Mehrdad Lotfi
Assistant coach	(Iran) Ali Kiaei
Goalkeeping coach	(Iran) Masoud Moghimi
Fitness coaches	(Iran) Navid dehghan shoar (Iran) mojtaba joudi
Supervisor	(Iran) Ebrahim Souri
Doctor	(Iran) Amir Bahador Esmaeili
Procurment	(Iran) Ehsan Ghara Hassanlou
Media director	(Iran) Saeid Faghani

Last updated: 17 December 2022
