= Gohar Zamin F.C. =

Iranian futsal club

Gohar Zamin
- Full name: Gohar Zamin Sirjan Futsal Club
- Ground: Imam Ali Indoor Stadium, Sirjan
- Owner: Goharzamin Iron Ore Company
- Head coach: Hossein Afzali
- League: Iranian Futsal Super League
- 2021–22: 1st

Gohar Zamin Sirjan Futsal Club (Persian: باشگاه فوتسال گهر زمین سیرجان) is an Iranian professional futsal club based in Sirjan.

== Honours ==
- Iran Futsal's 1st Division

Winners (1): 2021–22

== Players ==
=== Current squad ===
As of 2 February 2023

#	Position	Name	Nationality
4		Amin Rezaei	(Iran)
6		Majid Hajibandeh	(Iran)
7	Left flank	Behrouz Asadi	(Iran)
8		Mahdi Mahdikhani	(Iran)
9	Pivot	Mohammad Beyzaeinejad	(Iran)
10	Right flank	Mohammad Amin Shojaeifar	(Iran)
11	Defender	Majid Khazaei	(Iran)
12	Goalkeeper	Mojtaba Bazrafshan	(Iran)
13	Goalkeeper	Mehrzad Sadeghi	(Iran)
15	Pivot	Pouria Golshani	(Iran)
17		Amir Reza Kohzadi	(Iran)
23		Abolfazl Hosseini	(Iran)
25		Abbas Soltanpour	(Iran)
78		Moslem Hidari	(Iran)
89	Flank	Hamid Reza Rahanjam	(Iran)

== Personnel ==
=== Current technical staff ===
Position	Name
Head coach	(Iran) Hossein Afzali
Goalkeeping coach	(Iran) Esmaeil Goldoust
Under-23's head coach	(Iran) Ahmad Sadeghi
Under-23's sport doctor assistant	(Iran) Ali Hoseinpour
Under-23's supervisor	(Iran) Ali Nazeri
Under-20's head coach	(Iran) Sajjad Fakhrabadipour
Under-20's sport doctor assistant	(Iran) Ali Hoseinpour

Last updated: 17 October 2022
