= Ahoora Behbahan FSC =

Iranian futsal club

Ahoora
- Full name: Ahoora Behbahan Futsal Club
- Founded: 2011; 14 years ago
- Ground: Ali ibn Abi Talib Indoor Stadium, Behbahan
- Capacity: 1,000
- Owner: Iman Dehin
- Chairman: Iman Dehin
- 2020–21: 11th

Ahoora Behbahan Futsal Club (Persian: باشگاه فوتسال اهورا بهبهان, Bashgah-e Futsal-e Ahura Behebehan) is an Iranian professional futsal club based in Behbahan.

== Season by season ==
The table below chronicles the achievements of the Club in various competitions.

Season	League	Position	Notes
2016–17	2nd Division	1st / Group B	Promoted
2017–18	1st Division	1st / Group B	Promoted Play Off
2018–19	Super League	12th
2019–20	Super League	12th
2020–21	Super League	7th / Group A

Last updated: May 1, 2021

Champions	Runners-up	Third Place	Fourth Place	Relegation	Promoted	Did not qualify	not held

== Honours ==
- Iran Futsal's 1st Division

Runners-up (1): 2017–18

- Iran Futsal's 2nd Division

Winners (1): 2017

== Players ==
=== Current squad ===
As of 22 February 2022

#	Position	Name	Nationality
2	Goalkeeper	Fazel Bahmaei	(Iran)
3	Goalkeeper	Saman Moradipour	(Iran)
5		Iman Naraghinejad	(Iran)
10		Afshin Madari	(Iran)
19		Mehrdad Pourjani	(Iran)
21		Mohammad Amin Shabani	(Iran)
23		Mojtaba Bameri	(Iran)
27		Alireza Zabeh	(Iran)
88		Mehrdad Tayyebi	(Iran)

== Personnel ==
=== Current technical staff ===
Position	Name
Assistant coaches	(Iran) Mohammad Reza Attarpari (Iran) Abdollah Yousefi
Goalkeeping coach	(Iran) Mohammad Abouali
Supervisor	(Iran) Salman Hajavi
Procurment	(Iran) Reza Parvaneh
Media director	(Iran) Reza Aslafi
Director of public relations	(Iran) Mohammad Mostaghar

Last updated: 17 February 2022
