= Palayesh Naft F.C. =

Iranian association football club

Palayesh Naft Bandar Abbas
- Full name: Palayesh Naft Bandar Abbas Football Club
- Founded: 26 August 2024; 23 months ago
- Ground: Khalij-e Fars Stadium
- Capacity: 10,000
- Owner: Bandar Abbas Oil Refinery
- Chairman: Sina Kalhor
- Manager: Reza Enayati
- League: Azadegan League
- 2025–26: 8th
Home colours

Palayesh Naft Bandar Abbas F.C. (Persian: پالایش نفت بندر عباس) is an Iranian association football club based in Bandar Abbas, Hormozgan province.

The club competes in the Azadegan League. The club was established in August 2024 after acquiring the league licence of Esteghlal Mollasani F.C., allowing it to compete in the Azadegan League.

The club is affiliated with Bandar Abbas Oil Refinery Company and also has a futsal team.

== Current squad ==
Note: Flags indicate national team as defined under FIFA eligibility rules; some limited exceptions apply. Players may hold more than one non-FIFA nationality.

No.	Pos.	Nation	Player
1	GK	IRN	Mehdi Amini
3	DF	IRN	Bilal Mirzaali
4	DF	IRN	Seyed Jalal Abdi
6	DF	IRN	Mahyar Jabbari
7	MF	IRN	Sadegh Barani
8	DF	IRN	Farshad Asadi
9	FW	IRN	Peyman Ranjbari
10	FW	IRN	Ali Pourmohammad
11	FW	IRN	Peyman Miri
13	MF	IRN	Mojtaba Pourali
14	DF	IRN	Mehdi Abdoli
18	FW	IRN	Mohammadreza Koushki
19	FW	IRN	Ali Sobhani

No.	Pos.	Nation	Player
20	FW	IRN	Mohammad Aslani
21	FW	IRN	Pouria Rouhi
22	GK	IRN	Iman Sadeghi
26	MF	IRN	Mehdi Karbalai
27	FW	IRN	Iman Razani
46	DF	IRN	Esmail Pourdarvish
70	MF	IRN	Ali Fathi
77	MF	IRN	Jahanbakhsh Khabar
78	MF	IRN	Amirhossein Darvishi
85	FW	IRN	Mohammad Pourjafarnezhad
99	FW	IRN	Mojtaba Moradizadeh
