= Shahrvand Sari FSC =

Iranian futsal club

Shahrvand
- Full name: Shahrvand Sari Futsal Club
- Nickname: عقاب ها (Eagles)
- Founded: 1994; 32 years ago
- Ground: Sayed Rasoul Hosseini Arena
- Capacity: 3,727
- Owner: Saeid Najjarian Saravi
- Chairman: Saeid Najjarian Saravi
- Head coach: Masoud Najjarian
- League: Iran Futsal's 1st Division
- 2021–22: 14th of 14 (relegated)
- Website: http://fc-shahrvandesari.ir/
Away colours

Shahrvand Sari Futsal Club (Persian: باشگاه فوتسال شهروند ساری, Bashgah-e Futsal-e Shihervând Sari) is an Iranian professional futsal club based in Sari.

== History ==
The club was originally known as Shahrvand Sari, since the 2004/05 season. In the season of 2004/05 Super League it was renamed Rah Sari due to change of sponsorship. At 2014/15 Super League season Shahrvand Sari come back to maine name. Maine reason to come back this name is finance problem.

=== 2011–12 ===
Rah sari, in this season placed 13th in table and Relegatian to the 1st Division. But by the increasing of the number of teams, futsal committee decided to stay at the Super league.

=== 2014–15 ===
Rah sari, in 2013–14 Iranian Futsal Super League placed 14th in table and Relegatian to the 1st Division. But by took over the licence of Zam Zam Isfahan FSC in 2014–15 Iranian Futsal Super League.

== Crest ==
1994–2004

2004–2014

2014–present

== Season to season ==
The table below chronicles the achievements of the Club in various competitions.

Season	League										Hazfi	Leagues Top goalscorer		Manager
Season	Division		P	W	D	L	GF	GA	Pts	Pos	Hazfi	Name	Goals	Manager
1994‍~2003	??													
2003–04	Super League		22	7	7	8	84	98	28	8th		Mahmoud Lotfi	36	Alireza Raadi
2004–05	Super League		Renamed Rah Sari											Alireza Raadi
2004–05	Super League		26	10	5	11	102	101	35	8th				Alireza Raadi
2005–06	Super League		26	12	2	12	85	105	38	6th				Alireza Raadi
2007–08	Super League		25	8	4	13	78	108	28	8th				Mostafa Azari
2008–09	Super League		22	10	3	9	63	60	33	5th		Morteza Azimaei	32	Mehdi Nemati
2009–10	Super League		26	9	6	11	82	88	33	9th		Morteza Azimaei	31	Mehdi Nemati
2010–11	Super League		23	9	0	14	57	78	27	9th		Mahmoud Lotfi	17	Mehdi Nemati / Mostafa Azari
2011–12	Super League		26	5	5	16	61	85	20	13th		Iman Ahmadi	16	Mostafa Azari / Alireza Raadi
2012–13	Super League		24	7	2	15	67	79	23	10th		Morteza Azimaei	24	Mohammad Reza Heidarian / Jaber Kiannejad
2013–14	Super League		26	3	3	20	63	117	12	14th^{1}	Withdrew	Mohammad Reza Kord	17	Saeid Bastami / Nasser Saleh / Masoud Najjarian
2013–14	Hazfi Cup	Fourth Round	Cut Shahrud 3 – 0 (w/o) Rah Sari								Withdrew	—	—	—
2014–15	Super League		Renamed Shahrvand Sari									Hamid Reza Rahanjam	17	Mehdi Abtahi
2014–15	Super League		26	7	7	12	75	80	28	11th		Hamid Reza Rahanjam	17	Mehdi Abtahi
2015–16	Super League		25	8	3	14	55	73	27	12th		Taha Mortazavi	14	Mehdi Abtahi / Mahdi Nemati
2016–17	Super League		26	11	4	11	88	95	37	7th		Taha Mortazavi	21	Alireza Raadi
2017–18	Super League		26	7	9	10	61	63	30	9th		Ali Ebrahimi	12	Mohammad Ali Esmaeilpour
2018–19	Super League		26	11	6	9	87	78	39	7th		Morad Nazeri	19	Mohammad Ali Esmaeilpour
2018–19	Play Off		2	0	0	2	6	12	0	7th		Morad Nazeri	19	Mohammad Ali Esmaeilpour
Total			377	124	66	187	1114	1320	438					

Last updated: August 20, 2021

Notes:
* unofficial titles
1 worst title in history of club

Key

- P = Played
- W = Games won
- D = Games drawn
- L = Games lost
- GF = Goals for
- GA = Goals against
- Pts = Points
- Pos = Final position

Champions	Runners-up	Third Place	Fourth Place	Relegation	Promoted	Did not qualify	not held

== Honours ==
=== Individual ===
- Top Goalscorer

2003–04 Iranian Futsal Super League
(Iran) Mahmoud Lotfi (36 goals)
2008–09 Iranian Futsal Super League
(Iran) Morteza Azimaei (31 goals)

- Best Young Player

2013–14 Iranian Futsal Super League
(Iran) Mohammad Reza Kord

== Players ==
=== Current squad ===
As of 17 December 2022

#	Position	Name	Nationality
1	Goalkeeper	Hadi Shoja	(Iran)
3		Mehran Eideli	(Iran)
4		Davoud Mashhadi Kholardi	(Iran)
5		Alireza Nouri	(Iran)
6		Sajjad Ranjbar	(Iran)
8		Saber Khoshnama	(Iran)
9		Ahmad Dastyaran	(Iran)
11		Saeid Belbasi	(Iran)
12	Goalkeeper	Amir Hossein Bangi	(Iran)
13		Sajjad Paein Mahalli	(Iran)
14		Ehsan Sarvari	(Iran)
16		Ashkan Jafari	(Iran)
18		Abolfazl Asghari	(Iran)
20		Arash Ghasemzadeh	(Iran)
21		Milad Farzalipour	(Iran)
22		Shahab Ghorbani	(Iran)
23		Ali As'adi	(Iran)
24		Danial Bajan	(Iran)
25		Abolfazl Aghababaei	(Iran)
26		Reza Mirzapour	(Iran)

=== Notable players ===
- (Iran) Morteza Azimaei
- (Iran) Mohammad Reza Heidarian
- (Iran) Taha Mortazavi
- (Iran) Mahmoud Lotfi
- (Iran) Ali Kiaei
- (Iran) Mohammad Taheri
- (Iran) Ali Rahnama
- (Iran) Afshin Kazemi
- (Iran) Hamidreza Rahanjam

== Personnel ==
=== Current technical staff ===
Position	Name
Head coach	(Iran) Masoud Najjarian
Assistant coach	(Iran) Ramin Talebi
Goalkeeping coaches	(Iran) Mohsen Rasouli
Fitness coach	(Iran) Esmaeil Ghorbani
Supervisor	(Iran) Saeid Kheirandish
Doctor	(Iran) Masoud Ghasemi Taleshi
Procurment	(Iran) Pouria Shafiei

Last updated: 17 January 2022
