= Crop Alvand FSC =

Iranian futsal club

Crop
- Full name: Crop Alvand Iranian Futsal Club
- Founded: 2019; 7 years ago
- Ground: Yadegar Imam Indoor Stadium, Alvand
- Capacity: 3,500
- Owner: Mohammad Nakhbaf
- Chairman: Mohsen Nakhbaf
- Head Coach: Reza Lak Aliabadi
- League: Iranian Futsal Super League
- 2024-25: 3rd of 14

Crop Alvand Iranian Futsal Club (Persian: باشگاه فوتسال کراپ الوند ایرانیان, Bāshgāh-e Futsāl-e Krāp Alvand-e Irāniyān) is an Iranian professional futsal club based in Alvand.

== Season to season ==
The table below chronicles the achievements of the Club in various competitions.

Season	League									League's top goalscorer	
Season	Division	P	W	D	L	GF	GA	Pts	Pos	Name	Goals
2019–20	1st Division	Buy license from Federation									
2019–20	1st Division	18	11	4	3	51	33	37	1st / Group B		
2019–20	Play Off	3	1	1	1	3	5	4	2nd		
2020–21	Super league	12	4	4	4	36	35	16	3rd	Mahdi Javid	15
2020–21	Play Off	10	3	1	6	21	33	10	5th	Mahdi Javid	15
2021–22	Super league	26	18	5	3	104	62	59	3rd	Mahdi Javid	28
1st Division total		21	12	5	4	54	38	41			
Super league total		48	25	10	13	161	130	85			
Total		69	37	15	17	215	168	126			

Last updated: 12 March 2022

Notes:
* unofficial titles
1 worst title in history of club

Key

- P = Played
- W = Games won
- D = Games drawn
- L = Games lost
- GF = Goals for
- GA = Goals against
- Pts = Points
- Pos = Final position

Champions	Runners-up	Third Place	Fourth Place	Relegation	Promoted	Did not qualify	not held

== Honours ==
- Iran Futsal's 1st Division

Runners-up (1): 2019–20

== Players ==
=== Current squad ===
As of 11 December 2022

#	Position	Name	Nationality
2	Goalkeeper	Saeid Momeni	(Iran)
4	Defender	Alireza Rafieipour	(Iran)
6	Flank	Meysam Khayyam	(Iran)
7	Defender	Behzad Azimi	(Iran)
8	Defender	Mohammad Najaf Zangi	(Iran)
10		Erfan Mohammadian	(Iran)
11	Left flank	Mehran Alighadr	(Iran)
12	Goalkeeper	Amir Hossein Alvandi Fard	(Iran)
15		Ali Akrami	(Iran)
19	Flank	Ali Abedin	(Iran)
22	Defender	Saeid Afshari	(Iran)
23	Pivot	Shahab Talebi	(Iran)
45	Goalkeeper	Ali Ehsani	(Iran)
99	Pivot	Alireza Javan	(Iran)
		Alireza Karami	(Iran)

== Personnel ==
=== Current technical staff ===
Position	Name
Head coach	(Iran) Reza Lak Aliabadi
Assistant coaches	(Iran) Ali Zandipour
Goalkeeping coach	(Iran) Mohammad Hamedani
Fitness coach	(Iran) Ehsan Afrazideh
Supervisor	(Iran) Mehdi Haghani
Masseur	(Iran) Amir Sheikhi
Procurment	(Iran) Majid Mohammadkhani Ghiasvand
Media director	(Iran) Soheil Saadatmandi

Last updated: 6 September 2022

== Managers ==
Last updated: 6 September 2022

Name	Nat	From	To	Record				
Name	Nat	From	To	M	W	D	L	Win %
Hossein Afzali	(Iran)	August 2019	August 2020	21	12	5	4	57.14
Reza Lak Aliabadi	(Iran)	September 2020	April 2021	19	6	5	8	31.58
Mansour Molaei	(Iran)	April 2021	May 2021	3	1	0	2	33.33
Javad Asghari Moghaddam	(Iran)	June 2021	December 2021	13	7	4	2	53.85
Mahmoud Khorakchi	(Iran)	December 2021	August 2022	20	16	2	2	80.00
Reza Lak Aliabadi	(Iran)	September 2022	Present	0	0	0	0	—
