= Iranian Futsal Super League =

Futsal Super League
- Founded: 1998 officially; 2003 with current format
- Country: Iran
- Confederation: AFC
- Number of clubs: 14
- Level on pyramid: 1
- Relegation to: Iran Futsal's 1st Division
- International cup: AFC Futsal Club Championship
- Current champions: Mes Sungun (5th title) (2022–23)
- Most championships: Mes Sungun (5 titles)
- Broadcaster(s): IRIB TV3 IRIB Varzesh IRIB Provincial Channels
- Current: 2023–24 Iranian Futsal Super League

The Iranian Futsal Super League (Persian: سوپرلیگ فوتسال ایران, SuperLig-e Futsāl-e Irān), is a professional futsal league competition for clubs located at the highest level of the Iranian futsal league system founded in 2003.

The Super League is the top tier of an extensive pyramid-like structure, above the 1st Division, the 2nd Division and the lower local leagues.

== Champions ==
=== List of champions by season ===
Super League champions
Season	Winner	No. Super League titles
2003–04	Shensa	1
2004–05	Tam Iran Khodro	1
2005–06	Shensa	2
2007–08	Tam Iran Khodro	2
2008–09	Foolad Mahan	1
2009–10	Foolad Mahan	2
2010–11	Shahid Mansouri	1
2011–12	Shahid Mansouri	2
2012–13	Giti Pasand	1
2013–14	Dabiri	1
2014–15	Tasisat Daryaei	1
2015–16	Tasisat Daryaei	2
2016–17	Giti Pasand	2
2017–18	Mes Sungun	1
2018–19	Mes Sungun	2
2019–20	Mes Sungun	3
2020–21	Mes Sungun	4
2021–22	Giti Pasand	3
2022–23	Mes Sungun	5
2023–24	Giti Pasand	4

=== Most successful clubs ===
Team	Winners	Runners-up	Third place
Mes Sungun	5 (2017–18, 2018–19, 2019–20, 2020–21, 2022–23)	3 (2015–16, 2021–22, 2023–24)	2 (2014–15, 2016–17)
Giti Pasand	4 (2012–13, 2016–17, 2021–22, 2023–24)	8 (2010–11, 2011–12, 2013–14, 2014–15, 2018–19, 2019–20, 2020–21, 2022–23)	2 (2015–16, 2017–18)
Shahid Mansouri	2 (2010–11, 2011–12)	3 (2003–04, 2007–08, 2009–10)	1 (2012–13)
Tam Iran Khodro	2 (2004–05, 2007–08)	1 (2005–06)	1 (2008–09)
Tasisat Daryaei	2 (2014–15, 2015–16)	1 (2017–18)	—
Foolad Mahan	2 (2008–09, 2009–10)	—	3 (2007–08, 2010–11, 2011–12)
Shensa	2 (2003–04, 2005–06)	—	1 (2004–05)
Dabiri	1 (2013–14)	1 (2016–17)	—
Eram Kish	—	2 (2004–05, 2008–09)	1 (2003–04)
Saba	—	1 (2012–13)	—
Melli Haffari	—	—	3 (2009–10, 2013–14, 2018–19)
Sunich	—	—	2 (2019-20, 2020–21)
Crop	—	—	2 (2021–22, 2022–23)
Rah Ahan	—	—	1 (2005–06)
Sohan Mohammmad Sima	—	—	1 (2018-19)
Setaregan	—	—	1 (2019–20)
Gohar Zamin	—	—	1 (2023–24)

== All-time Futsal Super League ==
Since the 2003–04 season.

Pos	Team	Seasons	Pts	Pld	W	D	L	G.F.	G.A.	GD	1st	2nd	3rd	1st App	Since/Last App	Best
1	Giti Pasand	10	577 (Note: Persepolis and Giti Pasand were docked 6 points in the 2011–12 season by the Iranian Football Federation.)	267	176	55	36	1036	604	+432	2	6	2	2010-11	2019-20	1
2	Shahid Mansouri	12	539	297	162	53	82	1099	836	+263	2	3	1	2003-04	2015-16	1
3	Melli Haffari	12	498	310	142	72	96	1007	847	+160			2	2008-09	2019–20	3
4	Heyat Football Qom (Note: Eram Kish renamed to Kish Air, Saba, Mahan Tandis, Yasin Pishro, Heyat Football Qom.)	14	498	349	148	54	147	1152	1106	+46		3	1	2003-04	2017-18	2
5	Shahrvand (Note: Shahrvand renamed to Rah Sari)	16	486	406	138	72	196	1207	1400	−193				2003-04	2019–20	5
6	Mes Sungun	6	366	168	112	30	26	589	349	+240	3	1	2	2014-15	2019-20	1
7	Foolad Mahan (Note: Post Isfahan renamed to Foolad Mahan)	7	348	174	106	30	38	668	451	+217	2		3	2004-05	2011-12	1
8	Farsh Ara	8.5	320	223	91	47	85	586	583	+3				2011-12	2019-20	3
9	Dabiri	7	263	176	78	29	69	547	527	+20	1	1		2010-11	2016-17	1
10	Labaniyat Arjan	9	245	225	69	38	118	601	732	−131				2008-09	2019-20	6
11	Tasisat Daryaei	5	239	128	72	23	33	413	299	+114	2	1		2013-14	2017-18	1
12	Tam Iran Khodro	4	203	99	60	23	16	471	290	+181	2	1	1	2004-05	2008-09	1
13	Sh. Saveh	7	195	180	51	42	87	460	561	−101				2011-12	2018-19	6
14	Elmo Adab	5.5	190	135	53	31	51	383	372	+11				2005-06	2011-12	5
15	Shensa	4	182	87	56	14	17	327	220	+107	2		1	2003-04	2007-08	1
16	Sadra	6	175	147	47	34	66	458	473	−15				2003-04	2009-10	6
17	Misagh	5	167	127	47	26	54	326	358	−32				2011-12	2015-16	5
18	Moghavemat Alborz	6	167	157	44	35	78	349	478	−129				2014-15	2019-20	8
19	Gostaresh Foolad	4	148	97	44	16	37	276	255	+21				2008-09	2011-12	5
20	Azarakhsh	5	136	129	37	25	67	282	381	−99				2015-16	2019-20	7
21	Rah Ahan	4	127	102	37	16	49	345	380	−35			1	2003-04	2007-08	3
22	Ana Sanat (Note: Atoliyeh Tehran renamed to Sohan Mohammad Sima, Ferdows, Ana Sanat.)	7	206	154	57	35	62	395	422	−27				2017-18	2023-24	4
23	Esteghlal	4	116	102	33	17	52	290	364	−74				2003-04	2007-08	7
24	Firooz Sofeh	3	114	75	33	15	27	218	214	+4				2009-10	2011-12	4
25	Azad University	4	112	103	30	22	51	280	321	−41				2004-05	2016-17	6
26	S.B Azerbaijan Sharghi	3	110	77	30	20	27	257	232	+25				2004-05	2007-08	6
27	Persepolis	4	93 (Note: Persepolis was docked 3 points in the 2010–11 season by the Iranian Football Federation.)	97	28	18	51	300	381	−81				2003-04	2012-13	9
28	Sunich	2	90	61	26	12	23	181	167	+14				2018-19	2019-20	5
29	Poushineh Baft (Note: Felamingo renamed to Poushineh Baft)	3	80	73	22	14	37	229	261	−32				2007-08	2009-10	7
30	Sh. Tabriz	2	71	50	19	14	17	148	136	+12				2012-13	2013-14	7
31	Pegah	2	67	48	20	7	21	181	178	+3				2003-04	2004-05	4
32	Moghavemat Qarchak	2	59	52	15	14	23	124	142	−18				2017-18	2017-18	8
33	Heyat Football Kerman (Note: Zoghalsang renamed to Heyat Football Kerman)	3	52	73	15	7	51	200	359	−159				2007-08	2009-10	10
34	Ferdosi	2	50	51	14	8	29	122	168	−46				2014-15	2015-16	10
35	Hilal Ahmar	2	49	50	14	7	29	113	159	−46				2012-13	2013-14	11
36	Setaregan	1	48	31	15	3	13	85	88	−3			1	2019-20	2019-20	3
37	Ahoora	2	47	52	13	8	31	149	200	−51				2018-19	2019-20	12
38	Parsian	2	42	52	11	9	32	142	191	−49				2017-18	2018-19	13
39	Petroshimi	1	41	26	11	8	7	87	72	+15				2009-10	2009-10	4
40	Chini Hamgam	2	41	48	11	8	29	202	234	−32				2003-04	2004-05	11
41	PAS	1	35	22	10	5	7	86	70	+16				2003-04	2003-04	5
42	Hyper Shahr	1	29	26	8	5	13	62	84	−22				2019-20	2019-20	9
43	Fajr Ghaem	1	26	26	8	2	16	90	133	−43				2005-06	2005-06	13
44	Shahr Aftab	1	24	26	6	6	14	80	105	−25				2009-10	2009-10	13
45	Zam Zam	1	23	26	6	5	15	40	76	−36				2013-14	2013-14	12
46	Shahin	1	22	26	5	7	14	75	94	−19				2019-20	2019-20	14
47	Paya Sazeh	1	21	26	5	6	15	58	80	−22				2014-15	2014-15	14
48	Gaz Khuzestan	1	17	24	5	2	17	60	106	−46				2012-13	2012-13	12
49	Amaliyat Qeyr Sanati (Note: Amaliyat Qeyr Sanati renamed to Esteghlal Novin Mahshahr)	1	15	26	4	3	19	52	115	−63				2013-14	2013-14	13
50	Sh. Tonekabon	1	12	22	3	3	16	77	134	−57				2003-04	2003-04	12
51	Tarh va Toseh	1	11	26	3	2	21	47	102	−55				2016-17	2016-17	14
52	S.B Gilan	1	9	26	3	0	23	49	134	−85				2005-06	2005-06	14
53	Kashi Nilou	0.5	7	13	2	1	10	25	43	−18				2015-16	2015-16	14
54	Arash Beton	0.5	1	12	0	1	11	15	74	−59				2010-11	2010-11	13

2023–24 Iranian Futsal Super League	2023–24 Iran Futsal's 1st Division	2023 Iran Futsal's 2nd Division	To be determined	Club disappeared

- Updated to games played on 10 March 2019

== Players ==
=== Transfer season ===
- The summer transfer season for teams in the Super League lasts from June 8 to 12pm on July 16.

=== Rules and regulations ===
The Iranian Futsal Clubs who participate Futsal Super League are allowed to have up to maximum 30 players (including up to maximum 3 non-Iranian players) in their player lists, which was categorized in the following groups

- Up to maximum 16 adult (over 23 year old) players
- Up to maximum 4 under-23 players.
- Up to maximum 7 under-20 players.
- Up to maximum 3 under-18 players.

=== Notable foreign players ===
- (Brazil) Alê Falcone
- (Brazil) Walex dos Santos
- (Brazil) Sávio Sousa
- (Brazil) Café
- (Brazil) Rudimar Venâncio
- (Brazil) Jé
- (Brazil) Ciço
- (Kazakhstan) Taynan da Silva
- (Thailand) Suphawut Thueanklang

== Records ==
=== Winning managers ===
Season	Nationality	Winning manager	Club
2003–04	Iran	Saeid Tahmtan	Shensa
2004–05	Iran	Mohammad Hassan Ansarifard	Tam Iran Khodro
2005–06	Brazil	Sávio Sousa	Shensa
2007–08	Iran	Mahmoud Khorakchi	Tam Iran Khodro
2008–09	Iran	Alireza Afzal	Foolad Mahan
2009–10	Iran	Hossein Afzali	Foolad Mahan
2010–11	Iran	Reza Lak Aliabadi	Shahid Mansouri
2011–12	Iran	Reza Lak Aliabadi	Shahid Mansouri
2012–13	Iran	Alireza Afzal	Giti Pasand
2013–14	Iran	Amir Shamsaei	Dabiri
2014–15	Iran	Vahid Shamsaei	Tasisat Daryaei
2015–16	Iran	Vahid Shamsaei	Tasisat Daryaei
2016–17	Iran	Reza Lak Aliabadi	Giti Pasand
2017–18	Iran	Hamid Bigham	Mes Sungun
2018–19	Iran	Esmaeil Taghipour	Mes Sungun
2019–20	Iran	Alireza Afzal	Mes Sungun
2020–21	Iran	Ahmad Baghbanbashi	Mes Sungun
2021–22	Iran	Mohammad Keshavarz	Giti Pasand
2022–23	Iran	Esmaeil Taghipour	Mes Sungun
2023–24			

=== Multiple winning managers ===
No.	Winning manager	Club	No. titles
1	(Iran) Reza Lak Aliabadi	Shahid Mansouri (2) / Giti Pasand	3
1	(Iran) Alireza Afzal	Giti Pasand / Foolad Mahan / Mes Sungun	3
3	(Iran) Vahid Shamsaei	Tasisat Daryaei (2)	2
3	(Iran) Esmaeil Taghipour	Mes Sungun (2)	2
5	(Iran) Saeid Tahmtan	Shensa	1
5	(Brazil) Sávio Sousa	Shensa	1
5	(Iran) Mohammad Hassan Ansarifard	Tam Iran Khodro	1
5	(Iran) Mahmoud Khorakchi	Tam Iran Khodro	1
5	(Iran) Hossein Afzali	Foolad Mahan	1
5	(Iran) Amir Shamsaei	Dabiri	1
5	(Iran) Hamid Bigham	Mes Sungun	1
5	(Iran) Ahmad Baghbanbashi	Mes Sungun	1
5	(Iran) Mohammad Keshavarz	Giti Pasand	1

== See also ==
- Iran Futsal's 1st Division
- Iran Futsal's 2nd Division
- Iranian Futsal Hazfi Cup
- Iran's Premier Football League
- Azadegan League
- Iran Football's 2nd Division
- Iran Football's 3rd Division
- Iranian Super Cup
- Hazfi Cup
