= 2019 AFC Futsal Club Championship =

Tournament details
- Host country: Thailand
- City: Bangkok
- Dates: 7–17 August 2019
- Teams: 16 (from 16 associations)
- Venue: 1 (in 1 host city)

Final positions
- Champions: (Japan) Nagoya Oceans (4th title)
- Runners-up: (Iran) Mes Sungun
- Third place: (Vietnam) Thái Sơn Nam
- Fourth place: (Uzbekistan) AGMK

Tournament statistics
- Matches played: 32
- Goals scored: 215 (6.72 per match)
- Attendance: 16,776 (524 per match)
- Top scorer: (Japan) Kazuya Shimizu (10 goals)
- Best player: (Japan) Tomoki Yoshikawa
- Fair play award: (Iran) Mes Sungun

The 2019 AFC Futsal Club Championship was the 10th edition of the AFC Futsal Club Championship, an annual international futsal club tournament in Asia organised by the Asian Football Confederation (AFC). It was held in Bangkok, Thailand between 7–17 August 2019.

Mes Sungun were the defending champions, and were defeated by Nagoya Oceans in the final.

== Teams ==
Of the 47 AFC member associations, a total of 16 associations teams entered the competition, each entering one team. There was no qualification, and all entrants advanced to the final tournament.

Fifteen of the sixteen associations which participated in the 2018 AFC Futsal Club Championship returned for 2019, with Kuwait entering a representative for the first time since 2015, and replacing the Australian representatives.

Association	Team	Qualifying method	App (Last)
China	Shenzhen Nanling Tielang	2018–19 Chinese Futsal League champions	5th (2017)
Indonesia	Vamos Mataram	2018–19 Indonesia Pro Futsal League champions	3rd (2018)
Iran	Mes Sungun	2018–19 Iranian Futsal Super League champions	2nd (2018)
Iraq	Naft Al-Wasat	2018–19 Iraq Futsal League fourth place	5th (2018)
Japan	Nagoya Oceans	2018–19 F.League champions	9th (2018)
Kuwait	Kazma	2018–19 Kuwait Futsal League runners-up	1st
Kyrgyzstan	Osh EREM	2018–19 Kyrgyzstan Futsal League champions	3rd (2018)
Lebanon	Bank of Beirut	2018–19 Lebanon Futsal League champions	5th (2018)
Myanmar	Victoria University College	2018–19 Myanmar Futsal League runners-up	2nd (2018)
Qatar	Al-Rayyan	2018–19 Qatar Futsal League champions	5th (2017)
South Korea	FS Seoul	2018–19 FK-League champions	1st
Tajikistan	Soro Company	2018 Tajikistan Futsal League champions	1st
Thailand (hosts)	Port FC	2018 Futsal Thai League champions	2nd (2010)
United Arab Emirates	Al-Dhafrah	2018–19 UAE Futsal Federation Cup champions	3rd (2018)
Uzbekistan	AGMK	2018 Uzbekistan Futsal League champions	4th (2018)
Vietnam	Thái Sơn Nam	2018 Vietnam Futsal League champions	6th (2018)

== Venues ==
Nongchok, Bangkok
Bangkok Arena
Capacity: 12,000
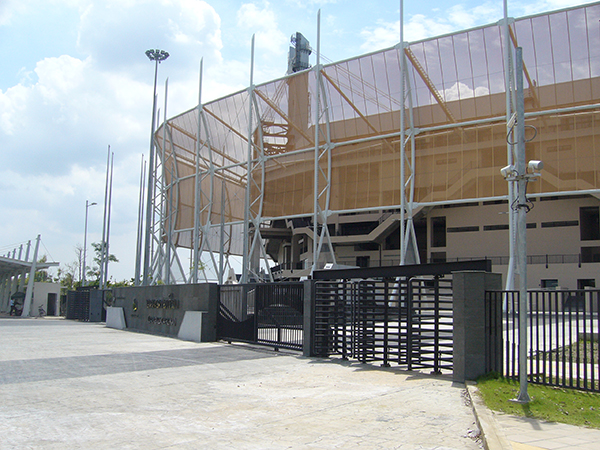

== Draw ==
The draw was held on 27 June 2019, 15:30 MYT (UTC+8), at the AFC House in Kuala Lumpur, Malaysia. The teams were seeded according to their association's performance in the 2018 AFC Futsal Club Championship, with the team from hosts Thailand automatically seeded and assigned to Position A1 in the draw.

Pot 1	Pot 2	Pot 3	Pot 4
1. (Thailand) Port FC; 2. (Iran) Mes Sungun; 3. (Vietnam) Thái Sơn Nam; 4. (Lebanon) Bank of Beirut	5. (Iraq) Naft Al-Wasat; 6. (Japan) Nagoya Oceans; 7. (Indonesia) Vamos Mataram; 8. (Kyrgyzstan) Osh EREM	9. (United Arab Emirates) Al-Dhafrah; 10. (China) Shenzhen Nanling Tielang; 11. (Qatar) Al-Rayyan; 12. (Tajikistan) Soro Company	13. (Uzbekistan) AGMK; 14. (Myanmar) Victoria University College; 15. (South Korea) FS Seoul; 16. (Kuwait) Kazma (unranked)

== Squads ==
Each team had to register a squad of 14 players, minimum two of whom must have been goalkeepers (Regulations Articles 30.1 and 30.2).

== Group stage ==
The top two teams of each group advanced to the quarter-finals.

Tiebreakers

Teams are ranked according to points (3 points for a win, 1 point for a draw, 0 points for a loss), and if tied on points, the following tiebreaking criteria are applied, in the order given, to determine the rankings (Regulations Article 10.5):

1. Points in head-to-head matches among tied teams;
2. Goal difference in head-to-head matches among tied teams;
3. Goals scored in head-to-head matches among tied teams;
4. If more than two teams are tied, and after applying all head-to-head criteria above, a subset of teams are still tied, all head-to-head criteria above are reapplied exclusively to this subset of teams;
5. Goal difference in all group matches;
6. Goals scored in all group matches;
7. Penalty shoot-out if only two teams are tied and they met in the last round of the group;
8. Disciplinary points (yellow card = 1 point, red card as a result of two yellow cards = 3 points, direct red card = 3 points, yellow card followed by direct red card = 4 points);
9. Drawing of lots.

All times are local, ICT (UTC+7).

Schedule
Matchday	Dates	Matches
Matchday 1	7–8 August 2019	1 v 4, 2 v 3
Matchday 2	9–10 August 2019	4 v 2, 3 v 1
Matchday 3	11–12 August 2019	1 v 2, 3 v 4

=== Group A ===
Pos	Team	Pld	W	D	L	GF	GA	GD	Pts	Qualification
1	(Thailand) Port FC (H)	3	3	0	0	10	1	+9	9	Knockout stage
2	(China) Shenzhen Nanling Tielang	3	2	0	1	12	9	+3	6	Knockout stage
3	(Kyrgyzstan) Osh EREM	3	1	0	2	8	14	−6	3	
4	(South Korea) FS Seoul	3	0	0	3	5	11	−6	0	

Source: AFC
Rules for classification: Group stage tiebreakers
(H) Hosts
7 August 2019
14:30

Osh EREM (Kyrgyzstan)	3–8	(China) Shenzhen Nanling Tielang
Farahmand 13'; Salimbaev 32', 37'	Report	Zhuang Jianfa 9', 22'; Gu Haitao 12'; Hassanzadeh 24', 28', 29'; Chen Zhiheng 25'; Zeng Liang 34'

Bangkok Arena, Bangkok
Attendance: 100
Referee: Helday Idang (Malaysia)
7 August 2019
19:30

Port FC (Thailand)	3–0	(South Korea) FS Seoul
Tanakul 3'; Watchara 4'; Nattawut 30'	Report

Bangkok Arena, Bangkok
Attendance: 1,200
Referee: Ebrahim Mehrabi Afshar (Iran)

9 August 2019
14:30

FS Seoul (South Korea)	3–5	(Kyrgyzstan) Osh EREM
Park Han-ul 6'; Lee Sun-ho 21'; Seo Won-geon 22'	Report	Mendibaev 4'; Abdrasul Uulu 13'; Alimov 32', 34'; Salimbaev 40'

Bangkok Arena, Bangkok
Attendance: 100
Referee: Jargalsaikhan Rentsenkhand (Mongolia)
9 August 2019
19:30

Shenzhen Nanling Tielang (China)	1–4	(Thailand) Port FC
Hassanzadeh 36'	Report	Osamanmusa 3', 14'; Nattawut 10'; Pornmongkol 20'

Bangkok Arena, Bangkok
Attendance: 4,196
Referee: Ryan Shepheard (Australia)

11 August 2019
17:00

Shenzhen Nanling Tielang (China)	3–2	(South Korea) FS Seoul
Hassanzadeh 19', 37'; Lu Yue 30'	Report	Seo Won-geon 11'; Lee Sun-ho 25'

Bangkok Arena, Bangkok
Attendance: 400
Referee: Fahad Al-Hosani (United Arab Emirates)
11 August 2019
19:30

Port FC (Thailand)	3–0	(Kyrgyzstan) Osh EREM
Osamanmusa 3'; Watchara 6', 39'	Report

Bangkok Arena, Bangkok
Attendance: 3,030
Referee: Trương Quốc Dũng (Vietnam)

=== Group B ===
Pos	Team	Pld	W	D	L	GF	GA	GD	Pts	Qualification
1	(Vietnam) Thái Sơn Nam	3	3	0	0	15	6	+9	9	Knockout stage
2	(Uzbekistan) AGMK	3	2	0	1	13	12	+1	6	Knockout stage
3	(Iraq) Naft Al-Wasat	3	1	0	2	16	15	+1	3	
4	(Qatar) Al-Rayyan	3	0	0	3	10	21	−11	0	

Source: AFC
Rules for classification: Group stage tiebreakers
7 August 2019
12:00

Naft Al-Wasat (Iraq)	9–4	(Qatar) Al-Rayyan
Zeyad 7'; Caro 13', 23', 23', 34'; Khalid 20'; Tavakoli 21'; Faisal 33'; Al-Deen 37'	Report	Al-Muhaza 8'; Taheri 18', 36'; Al-Boinin 31'

Bangkok Arena, Bangkok
Attendance: 100
Referee: Lee Po-fu (Chinese Taipei)
7 August 2019
17:00

Thái Sơn Nam (Vietnam)	4–1	(Uzbekistan) AGMK
Nguyễn Minh Trí 11'; Shimizu 21'; Trần Thái Huy 29', 33'	Report	Usmonov 6'

Bangkok Arena, Bangkok
Attendance: 200
Referee: Hiroyuki Kobayashi (Japan)

9 August 2019
12:00

AGMK (Uzbekistan)	5–3	(Iraq) Naft Al-Wasat
Ropiev 15', 25', 31'; Zeyad 29' (o.g.); Nishonov 39'	Report	Caro 14', 40'; Riyadh 40'

Bangkok Arena, Bangkok
Attendance: 100
Referee: Fahad Al-Hosani (United Arab Emirates)
9 August 2019
17:00

Al-Rayyan (Qatar)	1–5	(Vietnam) Thái Sơn Nam
Golabvand 13'	Report	Trần Thái Huy 20', 33'; Shimizu 32', 37'; Vũ Đức Tùng 36'

Bangkok Arena, Bangkok
Attendance: 100
Referee: Rey Ritaga (Philippines)

11 August 2019
12:00

Thái Sơn Nam (Vietnam)	6–4	(Iraq) Naft Al-Wasat
Shimizu 4', 9'; Phạm Đức Hoa 11', 35'; Vũ Đức Tùng 26'; Hồ Văn Ý 37'	Report	Khalid 12'; Faisal 12'; Al-Deen 29'; Tavakoli 30'

Bangkok Arena, Bangkok
Attendance: 50
Referee: Hiroyuki Kobayashi (Japan)
11 August 2019
14:30

Al-Rayyan (Qatar)	5–7	(Uzbekistan) AGMK
Taheri 1', 26'; Golabvand 11', 23', 24'	Report	Choriev 3' (pen.), 13'; Hamroev 5'; Usmonov 18', 18'; Nishonov 28'; Ropiev 34'

Bangkok Arena, Bangkok
Attendance: 200
Referee: Ryan Shepheard (Australia)

=== Group C ===
Pos	Team	Pld	W	D	L	GF	GA	GD	Pts	Qualification
1	(Lebanon) Bank of Beirut	3	3	0	0	15	4	+11	9	Knockout stage
2	(Indonesia) Vamos Mataram	3	2	0	1	9	8	+1	6	Knockout stage
3	(Tajikistan) Soro Company	3	1	0	2	12	18	−6	3	
4	(Myanmar) Victoria University College	3	0	0	3	7	13	−6	0	

Source: AFC
Rules for classification: Group stage tiebreakers
8 August 2019
12:00

Vamos Mataram (Indonesia)	6–4	(Tajikistan) Soro Company
Wossiry 3'; Syahidansyah 3'; Al Fajri 7'; Abedin 7'; Bawana 38'; Khalilvand 40'	Report	Alimakhmadov 7'; Sardorov 13', 24'; M. Sharipov 32'

Bangkok Arena, Bangkok
Attendance: 100
Referee: Husain Ali Al-Bahhar (Bahrain)
8 August 2019
17:00

Bank of Beirut (Lebanon)	4–2	(Myanmar) Victoria University College
Koukezian 2'; Suphawut 10'; Tomić 29'; Tneich 38'	Report	Aung Zin Oo 19' (pen.); Naing Lin Tun Kyaw 29'

Bangkok Arena, Bangkok
Attendance: 100
Referee: An Ran (China)

10 August 2019
12:00

Victoria University College (Myanmar)	0–3	(Indonesia) Vamos Mataram
	Report	Sumawijaya 19'; Iqbal 39'; Khalilvand 40'

Bangkok Arena, Bangkok
Attendance: 100
Referee: Kim Jong-hee (South Korea)
10 August 2019
17:00

Soro Company (Tajikistan)	2–7	(Lebanon) Bank of Beirut
Sardorov 7', 21'	Report	Tomić 1'; El-Dine 4', 31', 38'; Tneich 5'; Suphawut 36', 37'

Bangkok Arena, Bangkok
Attendance: 300
Referee: Trương Quốc Dũng (Vietnam)

12 August 2019
12:00

Bank of Beirut (Lebanon)	4–0	(Indonesia) Vamos Mataram
Suphawut 25'; El-Dine 26'; Koukezian 31', 39'	Report

Bangkok Arena, Bangkok
Attendance: 100
Referee: Rey Ritaga (Philippines)
12 August 2019
14:30

Soro Company (Tajikistan)	6–5	(Myanmar) Victoria University College
Kuziev 5'; R. Sharipov 6'; M. Sharipov 15'; Alimakhmadov 27', 35'; Sangov 34'	Report	Kaung Zaw Htet 11'; Aung Zin Oo 34', 35', 38', 40'

Bangkok Arena, Bangkok
Attendance: 100
Referee: Hasan Mousa Al-Gburi (Iraq)

=== Group D ===
Pos	Team	Pld	W	D	L	GF	GA	GD	Pts	Qualification
1	(Japan) Nagoya Oceans	3	3	0	0	10	5	+5	9	Knockout stage
2	(Iran) Mes Sungun	3	2	0	1	15	5	+10	6	Knockout stage
3	(United Arab Emirates) Al-Dhafrah	3	1	0	2	5	11	−6	3	
4	(Kuwait) Kazma	3	0	0	3	5	14	−9	0	

Source: AFC
Rules for classification: Group stage tiebreakers
8 August 2019
14:30

Nagoya Oceans (Japan)	4–2	(United Arab Emirates) Al-Dhafrah
S. Hoshi 15'; Hashimoto 20'; Nishitani 27'; Mizutani 37'	Report	Hatakeyama 4'; Lima 40'

Bangkok Arena, Bangkok
Attendance: 100
Referee: Anatoliy Rubakov (Uzbekistan)
8 August 2019
19:30

Mes Sungun (Iran)	8–2	(Kuwait) Kazma
Taghizadeh 3', 31'; Askari Kohan 12', 19'; Javid 20'; Bocão 24'; Fakhimzadeh 26'; Shajari 38'	Report	Al-Khalifah 28'; Hasan 40'

Bangkok Arena, Bangkok
Attendance: 100
Referee: Nurdin Bukuev (Kyrgyzstan)

10 August 2019
14:30

Kazma (Kuwait)	1–3	(Japan) Nagoya Oceans
Al-Farsi 36'	Report	Pepita 12', 36'; S. Hoshi 27'

Bangkok Arena, Bangkok
Attendance: 100
Referee: Husain Ali Al-Bahhar (Bahrain)
10 August 2019
19:30

Al-Dhafrah (United Arab Emirates)	0–5	(Iran) Mes Sungun
	Report	Shajari 3'; Javid 23', 25'; Vafaei 31'; Fakhimzadeh 36'

Bangkok Arena, Bangkok
Attendance: 100
Referee: Yuttakon Maiket (Thailand)

12 August 2019
17:00

Mes Sungun (Iran)	2–3	(Japan) Nagoya Oceans
Vafaei 19'; Fakhimzadeh 30'	Report	Hirata 8'; Pepita 13', 35'

Bangkok Arena, Bangkok
Attendance: 200
Referee: Yuttakon Maiket (Thailand)
12 August 2019
19:30

Al-Dhafrah (United Arab Emirates)	3–2	(Kuwait) Kazma
Lima 29'; Ab. Al-Hosani 32'; Hassan 38'	Report	Al-Farsi 21'; Hasan 34'

Bangkok Arena, Bangkok
Attendance: 100
Referee: Nurdin Bukuev (Kyrgyzstan)

== Knockout stage ==
In the knockout stage, extra time and penalty shoot-out are used to decide the winner if necessary, except for the third place match where penalty shoot-out (no extra time) is used to decide the winner if necessary (Regulations Articles 14.1 and 15.1).

=== Bracket ===
Quarter-finals
14 August – Bangkok
(Thailand) Port FC	3
(Uzbekistan) AGMK	4
14 August – Bangkok
(Lebanon) Bank of Beirut	2
(Iran) Mes Sungun (a.e.t.)	3
14 August – Bangkok
(Vietnam) Thái Sơn Nam	5
(China) Shenzhen Nanling Tielang	1
14 August – Bangkok
(Japan) Nagoya Oceans	3
(Indonesia) Vamos Mataram	1

Semi-finals
15 August – Bangkok
(Uzbekistan) AGMK	3
(Iran) Mes Sungun	7
15 August – Bangkok
(Vietnam) Thái Sơn Nam	1
(Japan) Nagoya Oceans	3

Final
17 August – Bangkok
(Iran) Mes Sungun	0
(Japan) Nagoya Oceans	2
Third place match
17 August – Bangkok
(Uzbekistan) AGMK	4
(Vietnam) Thái Sơn Nam	6

=== Quarter-finals ===
14 August 2019
11:00

Nagoya Oceans (Japan)	3–1	(Indonesia) Vamos Mataram
Pepita 9'; Hirata 20'; Ando 37'	Report	Sumawijaya 39'

Bangkok Arena, Bangkok
Attendance: 100
Referee: Ebrahim Mehrabi Afshar (Iran)

14 August 2019
14:00

Bank of Beirut (Lebanon)	2–3 (a.e.t.)	(Iran) Mes Sungun
Tneich 4'; El-Homsi 12'	Report	Bocão 3'; Javid 38'; Fakhimzadeh 44'

Bangkok Arena, Bangkok
Attendance: 200
Referee: Trương Quốc Dũng (Vietnam)

14 August 2019
17:00

Thái Sơn Nam (Vietnam)	5–1	(China) Shenzhen Nanling Tielang
Shimizu 22', 35'; Trần Thái Huy 30'; Nguyễn Minh Trí 37'; Tôn Thất Phi 38'	Report	Ding Shunjie 40'

Bangkok Arena, Bangkok
Attendance: 200
Referee: Yuttakon Maiket (Thailand)

14 August 2019
20:00

Port FC (Thailand)	3–4	(Uzbekistan) AGMK
Osamanmusa 39', 40', 40'	Report	Choriev 3', 40'; Hamroev 26'; Usmonov 35'

Bangkok Arena, Bangkok
Attendance: 3,300
Referee: Fahad Al-Hosani (United Arab Emirates)

=== Semi-finals ===
15 August 2019
15:00

Thái Sơn Nam (Vietnam)	1–3	(Japan) Nagoya Oceans
Nguyễn Mạnh Dũng 26'	Report	Pepita 5', 16'; S. Hoshi 35'

Bangkok Arena, Bangkok
Attendance: 100
Referee: Ryan Shepheard (Australia)

15 August 2019
18:00

AGMK (Uzbekistan)	3–7	(Iran) Mes Sungun
Usmonov 18'; Choriev 19'; D. Rakhmatov 32'	Report	Askari Kohan 9', 31'; Fakhimzadeh 12'; Shajari 14'; Javid 16', 36', 36'

Bangkok Arena, Bangkok
Attendance: 200
Referee: Nurdin Bukuev (Kyrgyzstan)

=== Third place match ===
17 August 2019
15:30

AGMK (Uzbekistan)	4–6	(Vietnam) Thái Sơn Nam
Usmonov 1'; Adilov 2'; Ropiev 6'; Choriev 34'	Report	Shimizu 5', 37', 40'; Ropiev 24' (o.g.); Nguyễn Mạnh Dũng 27'; Trần Thái Huy 28'

Bangkok Arena, Bangkok
Attendance: 200
Referee: Fahad Al-Hosani (United Arab Emirates)

=== Final ===
17 August 2019
18:00

Mes Sungun (Iran)	0–2	(Japan) Nagoya Oceans
	Report	Hirata 7'; Ando 33'

Bangkok Arena, Bangkok
Attendance: 1,200
Referee: Yuttakon Maiket (Thailand)

== Winners ==
AFC Futsal Club Championship
2019 Champions

Nagoya Oceans
Fourth Title

== Awards ==
Top Goalscorer	Most Valuable Player	Fair Play award
(Japan) Kazuya Shimizu (10 goals) (Thái Sơn Nam)	(Japan) Tomoki Yoshikawa (Nagoya Oceans)	(Iran) Mes Sungun

=== All-Star Team ===
Dream Team – Starting Five	Dream Team – Reserves
(Japan) Yushi Sekiguchi (Nagoya Oceans) (GK) (Iran) Farhad Fakhimzadeh (Mes Sungun) (Japan) Tomoki Yoshikawa (Nagoya Oceans) (Brazil) Pepita (Nagoya Oceans) (Iran) Mahdi Javid (Mes Sungun)	(Iran) Alireza Samimi (Mes Sungun) (GK) (Japan) Ryuta Hoshi (Nagoya Oceans) (Japan) Shota Hoshi (Nagoya Oceans) (Uzbekistan) Akbar Usmonov (AGMK) (Japan) Kazuya Shimizu (Thái Sơn Nam)
Coach
(Spain) Juan Francisco Fuentes Zamora (Nagoya Oceans)

== Top scorers ==
Team eliminated / inactive for this round.

Rank	Player	Team	MD1	MD2	MD3	QF	SF	TP	F	Total
1	(Japan) Kazuya Shimizu	(Vietnam) Thái Sơn Nam	1	2	2	2		3		10
2	(Iran) Mahdi Javid	(Iran) Mes Sungun	1	2		1	3			7
2	(Brazil) Pepita	(Japan) Nagoya Oceans		2	2	1	2			7
4	(Colombia) Angellot Caro	(Iraq) Naft Al-Wasat	4	2						6
4	(Uzbekistan) Davron Choriev	(Uzbekistan) AGMK			2	2	1	1		6
4	(Iran) Ali Asghar Hassanzadeh	(China) Shenzhen Nanling Tielang	3	1	2					6
4	(Thailand) Muhammad Osamanmusa	(Thailand) Port FC		2	1	3				6
4	(Vietnam) Trần Thái Huy	(Vietnam) Thái Sơn Nam	2	2		1		1		6
4	(Uzbekistan) Akbar Usmonov	(Uzbekistan) AGMK	1		2	1	1	1		6
10	(Myanmar) Aung Zin Oo	(Myanmar) Victoria University College	1		4					5
10	(Iran) Farhad Fakhimzadeh	(Iran) Mes Sungun	1	1	1	1	1			5
10	(Uzbekistan) Ikhtiyor Ropiev	(Uzbekistan) AGMK		3	1			1		5
