= 2024–25 Lebanese Futsal League =

Lebanese Futsal League
- Season: 2024-25
- Dates: 2 February 2025– TBD 2025
- Matches: 90
- Goals: 299 (3.32 per match)
- Top goalscorer: (Lebanon) Ali Hachem (12 goals)
- Biggest home win: Club Central Jounieh 11-1 Aamal Bikfaya
- Biggest away win: Chabibet Hamat 2-9 Sporting 1875

The 2024–25 Lebanese Futsal League is the 17th season of the Lebanese Futsal League, the top Lebanese league for Futsal clubs since its establishment in 2007.

On 26 September 2024, the Lebanese Football Association postponed the season due to the escalation of the conflict in the south with Israel. Following the ceasefire agreement with Israel on 27 November 2024, the Lebanese Football Association announced that the season would start on 2 February 2025.

== Teams ==
This season the number of teams participating are 10 teams other than the regular amount of 12 teams each season

=== Teams and locations ===
The following 10 clubs are playing in the Lebanese Futsal League during the 2024–25 season.

| Club | Home city | Top division titles | Last top division title |
|---|---|---|---|
| Aamal Bikfaya | Bikfaya | 0 | n/a |
| Beirut Stars | Beirut | 5 | 2018-19 |
| Chabibet Hamat | Hamat | 0 | n/a |
| Club Central Jounieh | Jounieh | 0 | n/a |
| Lebanese Army | Mar Roukouz | 1 | 2021-22 |
| Louaize | Zouk Mosbeh | 0 | n/a |
| NSK | Chadra | 0 | n/a |
| Sporting 1875 | Beirut | 0 | n/a |
| Tawfeer | Beirut | 2 | 2023–24 |
| TFA | Sidon | 0 | n/a |

== League table ==
| Pos | Team | Pld | W | D | L | GF | GA | GD | Pts | Qualification or relegation |
|---|---|---|---|---|---|---|---|---|---|---|
| 1 | Tawfeer | 9 | 7 | 1 | 1 | 43 | 16 | +27 | 22 | AFC Futsal Club Championship |
| 2 | Club Central Jounieh | 9 | 7 | 1 | 1 | 51 | 23 | +28 | 22 | |
| 3 | Lebanese Army | 9 | 7 | 0 | 2 | 43 | 26 | +17 | 21 | |
| 4 | NSK | 9 | 6 | 0 | 3 | 31 | 20 | +11 | 18 | |
| 5 | Sporting 1875 | 9 | 5 | 0 | 4 | 34 | 33 | +1 | 15 | |
| 6 | Beirut Stars | 9 | 4 | 1 | 4 | 19 | 21 | −2 | 13 | |
| 7 | TFA | 9 | 3 | 0 | 6 | 32 | 42 | −10 | 9 | |
| 8 | Aamal Bikfaya | 9 | 2 | 0 | 7 | 17 | 40 | −23 | 6 | |
| 9 | Chabibet Hamat | 9 | 1 | 1 | 7 | 20 | 43 | −23 | 4 | |
| 10 | Louaize | 9 | 1 | 0 | 8 | 9 | 35 | −26 | 3 | |

Updated to match(es) played on unknown. Source:
Rules for classification: 1) points; 2) goal difference; 3) number of goals scored.
