= 2019 AFC Futsal Club Championship squads =

The 2019 AFC Futsal Club Championship was an international futsal tournament held in Thailand from 7 to 17 August 2019. The 16 clubs involved in the tournament were required to register a squad of 14 players, minimum two of whom must be goalkeepers (Regulations Articles 30.1 and 30.2). Only players in these squads were eligible to take part in the tournament.

The position listed for each player is per the squad list in the official match reports by the AFC. Flags indicate national team as defined under FIFA eligibility rules. Players may hold more than one non-FIFA nationality. A flag is included for coaches that are of a different nationality than their own club's nationality.

== Group A ==
=== Port FC ===
Manager: Udom Taveesuk

The final squad was announced on 3 August 2019.

Note: Flags indicate national team as defined under FIFA eligibility rules; some limited exceptions apply. Players may hold more than one non-FIFA nationality.

No.	Pos.	Nation	Player
1	GK	THA	Nuttapong Yeemarep
2	MF	THA	Watchara Laisri
3	MF	THA	Nattawut Srirangpirot
4	DF	THA	Thawatchai Rairat
5	MF	THA	Anukul Mini
6	DF	THA	Lertchai Issarasuwipakorn
7	DF	THA	Chaivit Jamgrajang

No.	Pos.	Nation	Player
8	FW	THA	Sarawut Jaipech
9	MF	THA	Thananchai Chomboon
10	DF	BRA	Marcos Vinicius
11	FW	THA	Muhammad Osamanmusa
12	GK	THA	Kanison Phoopun
13	MF	THA	Tanakul Vichienkun
14	DF	THA	Pornmongkol Srisubseang

=== Osh EREM ===
Manager: Daniar Abdyraimov

The final squad was announced on 5 August 2019.

Note: Flags indicate national team as defined under FIFA eligibility rules; some limited exceptions apply. Players may hold more than one non-FIFA nationality.

No.	Pos.	Nation	Player
1	GK	KGZ	Bekbolot Akmataliev
2	DF	KGZ	Bekbolot Aitibaev
3	FW	KGZ	Toktobolot Tilekbekov
4	MF	KGZ	Dilshat Kadyrov
5	FW	KGZ	Azamat Mendibaev
6	FW	KGZ	Iuldashbai Salimbaev
7	DF	KGZ	Ulanbek Baigazy Uulu

No.	Pos.	Nation	Player
8	DF	KGZ	Beksultan Nazarov
9	FW	KGZ	Maksat Alimov
10	FW	IRN	Mohsen Farahmand
11	FW	KGZ	Adilet Kultaev
12	DF	KGZ	Sagyndyk Akimbaev
13	GK	IRN	Farid Soheili
14	DF	KGZ	Manas Abdrasul Uulu

=== Shenzhen Nanling Tielang ===
Manager: (Brazil) Jurandir Dutra

The final squad was announced on 6 August 2019.

Note: Flags indicate national team as defined under FIFA eligibility rules; some limited exceptions apply. Players may hold more than one non-FIFA nationality.

No.	Pos.	Nation	Player
1	GK	CHN	Zhu Bei
2	DF	CHN	Huang Tao
3	FW	CHN	Chen Zhiheng
4	FW	CHN	Huang Jiafu
5	DF	CHN	Liang Shiming
6	FW	CHN	Cong Lin
7	DF	CHN	Zhuang Jianfa

No.	Pos.	Nation	Player
8	MF	IRN	Ali Asghar Hassanzadeh
9	FW	CHN	Zeng Liang
10	FW	CHN	Lu Yue
11	FW	CHN	Gu Haitao
12	MF	CHN	Ding Shunjie
13	GK	CHN	Cheng Yingqiang
14	FW	BRA	Serginho

=== FS Seoul ===
Manager: Lee Chang-hwan

Note: Flags indicate national team as defined under FIFA eligibility rules; some limited exceptions apply. Players may hold more than one non-FIFA nationality.

No.	Pos.	Nation	Player
1	GK	KOR	Seo Jung-woo
2	GK	KOR	Choi Si-hong
3	MF	KOR	Lee Jong-min
4	DF	KOR	Oh Il-lok
5	MF	KOR	Jang Hyeok-chan
6	MF	KOR	Kim Gyeong-geun
7	MF	KOR	Kim Min-kuk

No.	Pos.	Nation	Player
8	MF	KOR	Kim Wan-ho
9	FW	KOR	Eom Tae-youn
10	MF	KOR	Kim Yun-young
11	MF	KOR	Seo Won-geon
12	DF	KOR	Lee Sun-ho
13	MF	KOR	Park Han-ul
14	MF	KOR	Hwang Kyung-jun

== Group B ==
=== Thái Sơn Nam ===
Manager: Phạm Minh Giang

The final squad was announced on 5 August 2019.

Note: Flags indicate national team as defined under FIFA eligibility rules; some limited exceptions apply. Players may hold more than one non-FIFA nationality.

No.	Pos.	Nation	Player
1	GK	VIE	Hồ Văn Ý
2	GK	VIE	Nguyễn Văn Huy
3	MF	VIE	Lê Quốc Nam
4	MF	VIE	Châu Đoàn Phát
5	DF	IRN	Alireza Rafieipour
6	MF	VIE	Phạm Đức Hòa
7	MF	VIE	Nguyễn Anh Duy

No.	Pos.	Nation	Player
8	FW	VIE	Nguyễn Minh Trí
9	MF	VIE	Trần Thái Huy
10	FW	VIE	Vũ Đức Tùng
11	DF	VIE	Trần Văn Vũ
12	FW	JPN	Kazuya Shimizu
13	DF	VIE	Nguyễn Mạnh Dũng
14	MF	VIE	Tôn Thất Phi

=== Naft Al-Wasat ===
Manager: Haitham Abbas

Note: Flags indicate national team as defined under FIFA eligibility rules; some limited exceptions apply. Players may hold more than one non-FIFA nationality.

No.	Pos.	Nation	Player
1	GK	IRQ	Yahya Abdul-Noor
2	FW	IRQ	Muheb Al-Deen
3	FW	IRQ	Haedr Majed
4	FW	IRQ	Tareq Zeyad
5	FW	IRQ	Hassan Ali Jabar
6	GK	IRQ	Abdul-Kadhim Hussein
7	FW	IRQ	Salim Faisal

No.	Pos.	Nation	Player
8	FW	IRQ	Fahad Methaq
9	FW	IRQ	Waleed Khalid
10	FW	COL	Angellot Caro
11	FW	IRQ	Husam Sabti
12	GK	IRQ	Omar Sabti
13	FW	IRN	Farhad Tavakoli
14	FW	IRQ	Ghaith Riyadh

=== Al-Rayyan ===
Manager: (Spain) Carlos Núñez

Note: Flags indicate national team as defined under FIFA eligibility rules; some limited exceptions apply. Players may hold more than one non-FIFA nationality.

No.	Pos.	Nation	Player
1	GK	QAT	Abdulrahman Qahtan
2	DF	QAT	Maaz Yousif
3	DF	QAT	Saad Al-Mohannadi
4	FW	QAT	Mubarak Al-Jarboey
5	FW	QAT	Said Al-Bulushi
6	FW	IRN	Safari Golabvand
7	FW	IRN	Mohammad Taheri

No.	Pos.	Nation	Player
8	FW	QAT	Abdulrahman Al-Yafei
9	MF	QAT	Hazem Selim
10	FW	QAT	Abdullah Al-Yafei
11	FW	QAT	Rashid Al-Boinin
12	GK	QAT	Ahmad Abusabha
13	GK	QAT	Ali Al-Ajmi
14	FW	QAT	Mubarak Al-Muhazaa

=== AGMK ===
Manager: Aleksandr Petrov

Note: Flags indicate national team as defined under FIFA eligibility rules; some limited exceptions apply. Players may hold more than one non-FIFA nationality.

No.	Pos.	Nation	Player
1	GK	UZB	Rustam Umarov
2	GK	UZB	Abbosbek Ulmasbekov
3	DF	UZB	Mashrab Adilov
4	FW	UZB	Ikhtiyor Ropiev
5	FW	UZB	Ilhomjon Hamroev
6	FW	UZB	Khusniddin Nishonov
7	FW	UZB	Dilshod Rakhmatov

No.	Pos.	Nation	Player
8	FW	UZB	Davron Valijonov
9	MF	UZB	Alan Aminov
10	FW	UZB	Akbar Usmonov
11	FW	UZB	Temur Berdiev
12	MF	UZB	Davron Choriev
13	MF	UZB	Islombek Biyturaev
14	FW	UZB	Anaskhon Rakhmatov

== Group C ==
=== Bank of Beirut ===
Manager: Alexandre Cafu

The 15-man preliminary squad was announced on 31 July 2019.

Note: Flags indicate national team as defined under FIFA eligibility rules; some limited exceptions apply. Players may hold more than one non-FIFA nationality.

No.	Pos.	Nation	Player
1	GK	LBN	Hussein Hamadani
2	GK	LBN	Karim Joueidi
3	FW	LBN	Ali Tneich
4	DF	LBN	Ali El-Homsi
5	FW	LBN	Christian El-Khoury
6	FW	LBN	Christophe El Moujabber
7	FW	LBN	Moustafa Serhan

No.	Pos.	Nation	Player
8	FW	LBN	Steve Koukezian
9	DF	LBN	Mouhammad Hammoud
10	DF	LBN	Ahmad Kheir El-Dine
11	FW	SRB	Dragan Tomić
12	DF	LBN	Karim Abou Zeid
13	GK	LBN	Mohamad Zreik
14	FW	THA	Suphawut Thueanklang

=== Vamos Mataram ===
Manager: (Iran) Reza Fallahzadeh

The 15-man preliminary squad was announced on 1 August 2019. The final squad was announced on 8 August.

Note: Flags indicate national team as defined under FIFA eligibility rules; some limited exceptions apply. Players may hold more than one non-FIFA nationality.

No.	Pos.	Nation	Player
1	GK	IDN	Yusuf Kurniawan
2	FW	IDN	Al Fajri Zikri
3	DF	IDN	Adolfo Yembise
4	MF	IDN	Nandi Sumawijaya
5	DF	IDN	Bagus Himawan
6	MF	IDN	Fachri Deriantama
7	MF	IDN	Obay Sobandi

No.	Pos.	Nation	Player
8	MF	IDN	Dennis Bawana
9	FW	IDN	Syahidansyah Lubis
10	MF	IRN	Ali Abedin
11	DF	IRN	Ali Khalilvand
12	GK	IDN	Nizar Nayaruddin
13	MF	IDN	Iqbal Aliefian
14	MF	IDN	Marvin Wossiry

=== Soro Company ===
Manager: Pairav Vohidov

Note: Flags indicate national team as defined under FIFA eligibility rules; some limited exceptions apply. Players may hold more than one non-FIFA nationality.

No.	Pos.	Nation	Player
1	GK	TJK	Firuz Bekmurodov
2	GK	TJK	Murodullo Alikulov
3	DF	TJK	Komron Aliev
4	DF	TJK	Idris Yorov
5	DF	TJK	Sobirdzhon Gulyakov
6	MF	TJK	Nekruz Alimakhmadov
7	MF	TJK	Siyovush Kayumov

No.	Pos.	Nation	Player
8	MF	TJK	Muhammadjon Sharipov
9	FW	TJK	Fayzali Sardorov
10	FW	TJK	Akbarjon Ortukov
11	FW	TJK	Firuz Sangov
12	FW	TJK	Umed Kuziev
13	DF	TJK	Rahmonali Sharipov
14	DF	TJK	Nasim Sharipov

=== Victoria University College ===
Manager: Htay Myint

The final squad was announced on 6 August 2019.

Note: Flags indicate national team as defined under FIFA eligibility rules; some limited exceptions apply. Players may hold more than one non-FIFA nationality.

No.	Pos.	Nation	Player
1	GK	MYA	Zaw Myo Htike
2	MF	MYA	Ye Zaw Hlaing
3	DF	MYA	Thant Zin Tun
4	MF	MYA	Ye Yint Oo
5	DF	MYA	Thu Ya
6	MF	MYA	Soe Lin Htet
7	FW	MYA	Kaung Zaw Htet

No.	Pos.	Nation	Player
8	MF	MYA	Myo Myint Soe
9	FW	MYA	Wai Zin Oo
10	MF	MYA	Thiha Soe
11	FW	MYA	Nyein Min Soe
12	GK	MYA	Pyae Phyo Aung
13	MF	MYA	Aung Zin Oo
14	MF	MYA	Naing Lin Tun Kyaw

== Group D ==
=== Mes Sungun ===
Manager: Esmaeil Taghipour

The final squad was announced on 6 August 2019.

Note: Flags indicate national team as defined under FIFA eligibility rules; some limited exceptions apply. Players may hold more than one non-FIFA nationality.

No.	Pos.	Nation	Player
1	GK	IRN	Saeid Momeni
2	GK	IRN	Alireza Samimi
3	FW	IRN	Mohammad Hajizadeh
4	FW	BRA	Bocão
5	DF	IRN	Mohammad Shajari
6	MF	IRN	Alireza Vafaei
7	FW	IRN	Farhad Fakhimzadeh

No.	Pos.	Nation	Player
8	MF	IRN	Salar Aghapour
9	MF	IRN	Saeid Taghizadeh
10	DF	IRN	Babak Nasiri
11	MF	IRN	Abolghasem Orouji
12	FW	IRN	Alireza Askari
14	FW	IRN	Mahdi Javid

=== Nagoya Oceans ===
Manager: (Spain) Juan Fuentes

The final squad was announced on 5 August 2019.

Note: Flags indicate national team as defined under FIFA eligibility rules; some limited exceptions apply. Players may hold more than one non-FIFA nationality.

No.	Pos.	Nation	Player
1	GK	JPN	Ryuma Shinoda
2	GK	JPN	Yushi Sekiguchi
3	DF	JPN	Shokei Onitsuka
4	MF	JPN	Soma Mizutani
5	DF	JPN	Ryuta Hoshi
6	MF	JPN	Tomoki Yoshikawa
7	FW	JPN	Ryohei Ando

No.	Pos.	Nation	Player
8	MF	BRA	Pepita
9	FW	JPN	António Hirata
10	MF	JPN	Masaya Hashimoto
11	FW	JPN	Shota Hoshi
12	DF	JPN	Daiki Kasai
13	MF	JPN	Yusho Nomura
14	MF	JPN	Ryosuke Nishitani

=== Al-Dhafrah ===
Manager: (Portugal) Rui Guimarães

Note: Flags indicate national team as defined under FIFA eligibility rules; some limited exceptions apply. Players may hold more than one non-FIFA nationality.

No.	Pos.	Nation	Player
1	GK	UAE	Salem Al-Ameri
2	DF	UAE	Mohammed Obaid
3	FW	UAE	Fahad Ahmed
4	DF	UAE	Taher Hassan
5	MF	UAE	Ahmed Al-Hosani
6	FW	JPN	Takashi Hatakeyama
7	GK	UAE	Mayed Al-Maeeni

No.	Pos.	Nation	Player
8	MF	UAE	Talib Al-Fzari
9	FW	POR	Fábio Lima
10	DF	UAE	Mohamed Fadaaq
11	FW	UAE	Hamdan Al-Katheeri
12	GK	UAE	Hassan Al-Hantoobi
13	MF	UAE	Abdalla Al-Hosani
14	FW	UAE	Younis Al-Hammadi

=== Kazma ===
Manager: (Portugal) Tiago Polido

Note: Flags indicate national team as defined under FIFA eligibility rules; some limited exceptions apply. Players may hold more than one non-FIFA nationality.

No.	Pos.	Nation	Player
1	GK	KUW	Mohammad Al-Huzaim
2	DF	IRQ	Mustafa Bachay
3	FW	KUW	Yousef Al-Khalifah
4	DF	KUW	Ahmad Al-Farsi
5	MF	KUW	Salem Al-Mekaimi
6	FW	KUW	Abdulrahman Al-Wadi
7	MF	KUW	Yousef Al-Baghlai

No.	Pos.	Nation	Player
8	MF	KUW	Meshari Al-Zebaibi
9	FW	ITA	Vampeta
10	DF	KUW	Saleh Hasan
11	FW	KUW	Saleh Al-Fadhel
12	MF	KUW	Abdulrahman Al-Tawail
13	GK	KUW	Hani Mhisen
14	FW	KUW	Abdullah Al-Shemali
