= Dejan Đedović =

Serbian futsal coach

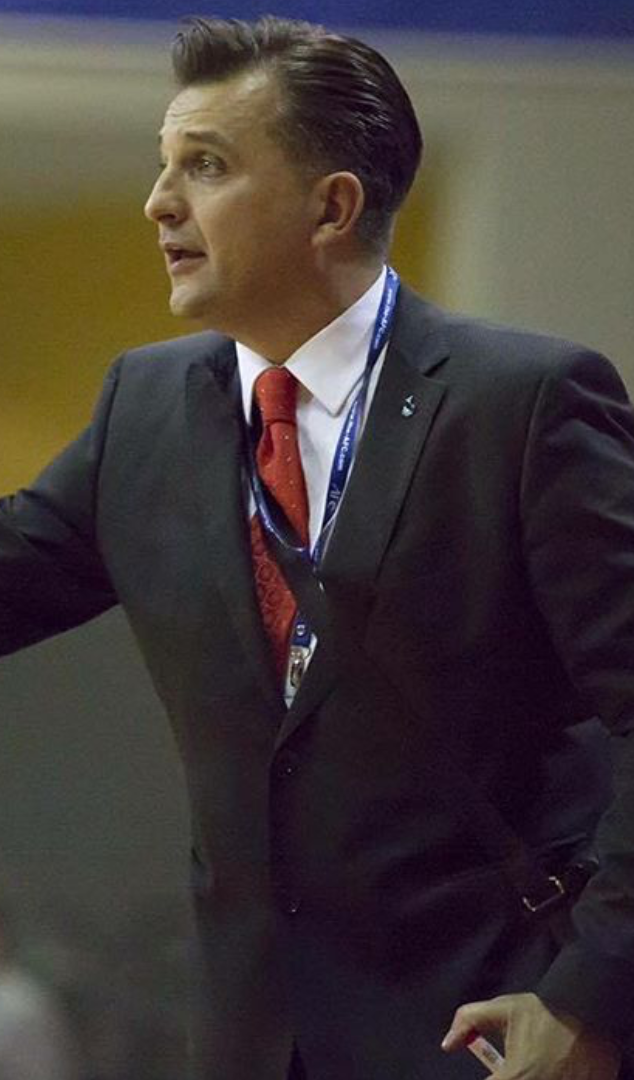

Personal information
- Full name: Dejan Đedović
- Date of birth: 21 August 1973 (age 53)
- Place of birth: Čačak, Serbia
- Height: 1.84 m (6 ft 0 in)

Team information
- Current team: Afghanistan national futsal team

Senior career*
Years	Team	Apps	(Gls)
- KMF Požega

Managerial career
- KMF Požega
- 2009–2011: KMF Kolubara
- 2011: AUST Futsal club
- 2011–2012: All Sports
- 2013–2018: Bank Of Beirut
- 2019: Sipar Khujand
- 2019–2020: Tajikistan (futsal)
- 2020–2022: Al Dhafra (futsal)
- 2022–2022: Al Ittihad Kalba futsal
- 2023-2023: KMF Loznica Grad
- 2023-2025: Fumei Shijiazhuang
- 2026-: Afghanistan national futsal team
- * Club domestic league appearances and goals

Dejan Đedović (Serbian : Дејан Ђедовић, born 21 August 1973) is a Serbian futsal coach from Zlatibor.

== Achievements ==
2011-2012 All Sports Beirut (Lebanon) Champion
2013-2014 Bank Of Beirut SC ( Lebanon ) Champion
2014-2015 Bank of Beirut SC ( Lebanon ) Super Cup Winner
2014-2015 Bank of Beirut SC ( Lebanon ) Champion
2014-2015 Bank of Beirut SC ( Lebanon ) Cup winner
2015-2016 Bank of Beirut SC ( Lebanon ) Vice Champion
2015-2016 Bank of Beirut SC ( Lebanon ) Cup winner
2016-2017 Bank of Beirut SC ( Lebanon ) Champion
2017 Bank of Beirut SC ( Lebanon ) Super Cup Winner
2017-2018 Bank of Beirut SC ( Lebanon ) Cup winner
2017-2018 Bank of Beirut SC ( Lebanon ) Champion
2018 AFC Futsal Club Championship 2018 Bank of Beirut SC 3rd place
2019 Tajikistan futsal league Sipar Vice Champion
2021 UAE President cup Al Dhafra vice champion
2021 UAE Futsal league Al Dhafra Champion
2021 Al Dhafra UAE futsal SUPER CUP Winner
2021 Al Dhafra UAE UAE Federation cup Vice Champion
2023 Fumei (China ) FA Cup runner up
2024 Fumei (China ) CFA league bronze medal 3rd place
2024 Fumei (China ) Shijiazhuang Cup Champion
2024 Fumei (China ) International futsal cup 4th place
2024 Fumei (China ) FA Cup vice champion
2025 Fumei (China ) CFA league silver medal 2nd place

== Other activities ==
2005 to 2008 President Association of Serbian futsal clubs
