= 2017 AFC Futsal Club Championship =

Tournament details
- Host country: Vietnam
- City: Ho Chi Minh City
- Dates: 20–30 July 2017
- Teams: 14 (from 14 associations)
- Venue: 1 (in 1 host city)

Final positions
- Champions: (Thailand) Chonburi Bluewave (2nd title)
- Runners-up: (Iran) Giti Pasand Isfahan
- Third place: (Vietnam) Thái Sơn Nam
- Fourth place: (Qatar) Al Rayyan

Tournament statistics
- Matches played: 26
- Goals scored: 155 (5.96 per match)
- Attendance: 26,950 (1,037 per match)
- Top scorer: (Thailand) Jirawat Sornwichian (9 goals)
- Best player: (Iran) Ali Asghar Hassanzadeh
- Fair play award: (Vietnam) Thái Sơn Nam

The 2017 AFC Futsal Club Championship was the 8th edition of the AFC Futsal Club Championship, an annual international futsal club tournament in Asia organised by the Asian Football Confederation (AFC). It was held in Ho Chi Minh City, Vietnam from 20 to 30 July 2017.

The tournament was won by Chonburi Bluewave from Thailand after defeating Giti Pasand Isfahan from Iran 3–2 in the final. The win was Chonburi Bluewave's second Asian title, following after they won the 2013 AFC Futsal Club Championship four years ago.

Nagoya Oceans from Japan were the defending champions, but they failed to qualify from the 2016–17 season of Japanese futsal league following their loss to Shriker Osaka for the Japanese champions.

== Qualified teams ==
A total of 14 teams from the 14 of the 47 AFC member associations entered the tournament, which included first-time entrants from Tajikistan. Kyrgyzstan returned after a one-year absence, while Indonesia entered a team for the first time since 2011. From the associations participating in 2016, only Chinese Taipei did not enter the tournament.

For teams entering the tournament, they were assigned a seeding position according to their 2016 AFC Futsal Club Championship ranking for the respective draw and the hosts associations.

Rank	Association	Team	Qualifying method
1	Japan	Shriker Osaka	2016–17 F. League champions
2	Iraq	Naft Al-Wasat	2016–17 Iraq Futsal League champions
3	Thailand	Chonburi Bluewave	2016 Futsal Thailand League champions
4	(United Arab Emirates) United Arab Emirates	Al-Dhafra	2016–17 UAE Futsal League champions
5	Iran	Giti Pasand Isfahan	2016–17 Iranian Futsal Super League champions
6	Qatar	Al Rayyan	2016–17 Qatar Futsal League champions
7	Uzbekistan	AGMK	2016 Uzbekistan Futsal League champions
8	Vietnam (hosts)	Thái Sơn Nam	2016 Vietnam Futsal League champions
9	Australia	Vic Vipers	2016 F-League champions
10	Lebanon	Bank of Beirut	2016–17 Lebanon Futsal League champions
11	China	Shenzhen Nanling	2016–17 Chinese Futsal League champions
—	Indonesia	Vamos Mataram	2016–17 Indonesia Pro Futsal League champions
—	Kyrgyzstan	Osh EREM	2016–17 Kyrgyzstan Futsal League champions
—	Tajikistan	Disi Invest	2016–17 Tajikistan Futsal League champions

Location of teams of the 2017 AFC Futsal Club Championship.
ASEAN Region
Central Region
East Region
West Region

== Venue ==
The all matches was held at the Phú Thọ Indoor Stadium in Ho Chi Minh City.

Ho Chi Minh City
Phú Thọ Indoor Stadium
Capacity: 5,000
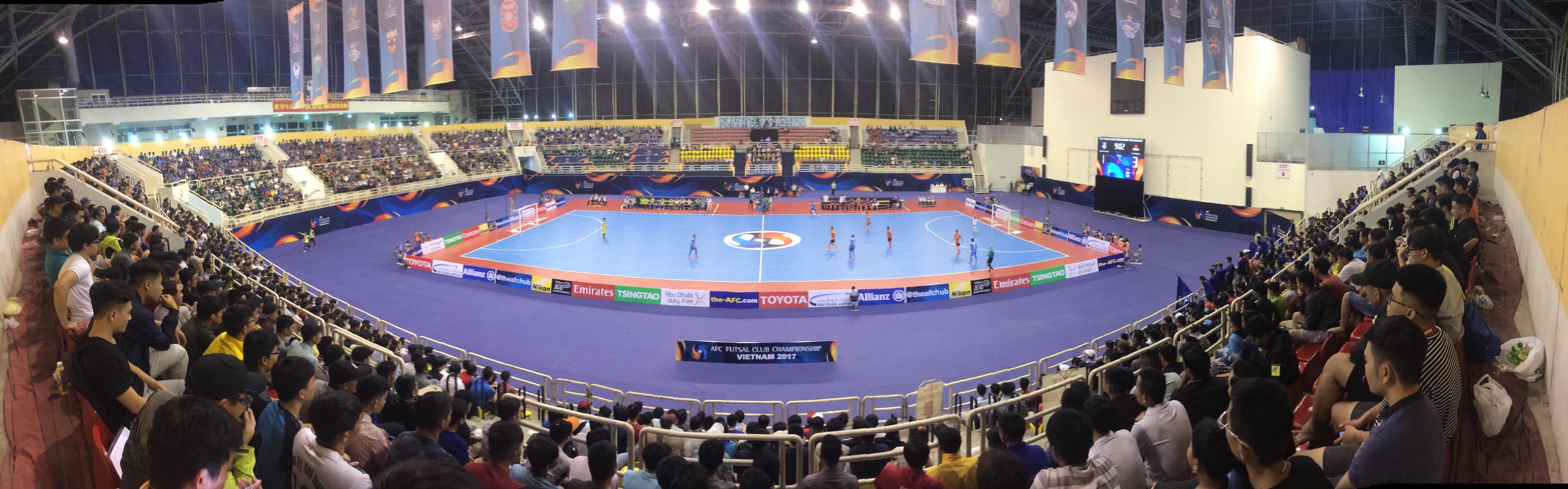

== Draw ==
The draw was held on 30 May 2017, 15:00 ICT (UTC+7), at the Grand Hotel Saigon in Ho Chi Minh City. The 14 teams were drawn into two groups of four teams (Groups A and B) and two groups of three teams (Groups C and D), with the representatives from hosts Vietnam automatically assigned to position A1 in the draw. The teams were seeded according to the performances of their association's representatives in the 2016 AFC Futsal Club Championship.

Pot 1	Pot 2	Pot 3	Pot 4 (unranked)
1. (Vietnam) Thái Sơn Nam; 2. (Japan) Shriker Osaka; 3. (Iraq) Naft Al-Wasat; 4. (Thailand) Chonburi Bluewave	5. (United Arab Emirates) Al-Dhafra; 6. (Iran) Giti Pasand Isfahan; 7. (Qatar) Al Rayyan; 8. (Uzbekistan) AGMK	9. (Australia) Vic Vipers; 10. (Lebanon) Bank of Beirut; 11. (China) Shenzhen Nanling	(Indonesia) Vamos Mataram; (Kyrgyzstan) EREM; (Tajikistan) Disi Invest

== Squads ==
Each team must register a squad of 14 players, minimum two of whom must be goalkeepers (Regulations Articles 30.1 and 30.2).

== Match officials ==
The following referees were chosen for the 2017 AFC Futsal Club Championship.

Referees

- (Australia) Darius Turner
- (Bahrain) Hussain Ali Al-Bahhar
- (China) Liu Jianqiao
- (Chinese Taipei) Lee Po-fu
- (Iran) Mahmoudreza Nasirloo
- (Japan) Hiroyuki Kobayashi
- (Japan) Tomohiro Kozaki
- (Kyrgyzstan) Nurdin Bukuev
- (Lebanon) Mohamad Chami
- (Malaysia) Helday Idang
- (Philippines) Rey Ritaga
- (South Korea) Kim Jong-hee
- (Thailand) Maiket Yuttakon
- (Turkmenistan) Azat Hajypolatov
- (Vietnam) Trương Quốc Dũng

== Group stage ==
The top two teams of each group advance to the quarter-finals.

Tiebreakers

Teams are ranked according to points (3 points for a win, 1 point for a draw, 0 points for a loss), and if tied on points, the following tiebreaking criteria are applied, in the order given, to determine the rankings (Regulations Article 10.5):

1. Points in head-to-head matches among tied teams;
2. Goal difference in head-to-head matches among tied teams;
3. Goals scored in head-to-head matches among tied teams;
4. If more than two teams are tied, and after applying all head-to-head criteria above, a subset of teams are still tied, all head-to-head criteria above are reapplied exclusively to this subset of teams;
5. Goal difference in all group matches;
6. Goals scored in all group matches;
7. Penalty shoot-out if only two teams are tied and they met in the last round of the group;
8. Disciplinary points (yellow card = 1 point, red card as a result of two yellow cards = 3 points, direct red card = 3 points, yellow card followed by direct red card = 4 points);
9. Drawing of lots.

All times are local, Indochina Time (UTC+7).

=== Group A ===
Pos	Team	Pld	W	D	L	GF	GA	GD	Pts	Qualification
1	(United Arab Emirates) Al-Dhafra	3	2	0	1	8	3	+5	6 (Note: Head-to-head results: Thái Sơn Nam 4–5 EREM, EREM 0–4 Al-Dhafra, Thái Sơn Nam 2–0 Al-Dhafra. Head-to-head standings: Al-Dhafra: 3 pts, +2 GD; Thái Sơn Nam: 3 pts, +1 GD; EREM: 3 pts, −3 GD)	Knockout stage
2	(Vietnam) Thái Sơn Nam (H)	3	2	0	1	15	7	+8	6	Knockout stage
3	(Kyrgyzstan) EREM	3	2	0	1	6	8	−2	6	
4	(Australia) Vic Vipers	3	0	0	3	3	14	−11	0	

Source: AFC
Rules for classification: Group stage tiebreakers
(H) Hosts
Notes:
20 July 2017
16:30

Al-Dhafra (United Arab Emirates)	4–1	(Australia) Vic Vipers
Henmi 2', 17'; Vassoura 31', 38'	Report	Alinejad 14'

Phú Thọ Indoor Stadium, Ho Chi Minh City
Attendance: 200
Referee: Lee Po-fu (Chinese Taipei)
20 July 2017
19:00

Thái Sơn Nam (Vietnam)	4–5	(Kyrgyzstan) EREM
Hòa 8'; Nam 34'; Tayyebi 38', 40'	Report	Kadyrov 19'; Alimov 19', 31', 37'; Ulanbek 38'

Phú Thọ Indoor Stadium, Ho Chi Minh City
Attendance: 3,800
Referee: Mahmoudreza Nasirloo (Iran)

22 July 2017
16:30

EREM (Kyrgyzstan)	0–4	(United Arab Emirates) Al-Dhafra
	Report	Jamil 24'; Vassoura 36', 38'; Al-Hammadi 39'

Phú Thọ Indoor Stadium, Ho Chi Minh City
Attendance: 250
Referee: Kim Jong-hee (Korea Republic)
22 July 2017
19:00

Vic Vipers (Australia)	2–9	(Vietnam) Thái Sơn Nam
Barrientos 30'; Constantinidis 39'	Report	Nam 2', 10', 25'; Luân 5', 25'; Huy 13'; Tayyebi 18' (pen.), 35'; Vũ 27'

Phú Thọ Indoor Stadium, Ho Chi Minh City
Attendance: 3,400
Referee: Mohamad Chami (Lebanon)

24 July 2017
16:30

Vic Vipers (Australia)	0–1	(Kyrgyzstan) EREM
	Report	Kultaev 20'

Phú Thọ Indoor Stadium, Ho Chi Minh City
Attendance: 250
Referee: Helday Idang (Malaysia)
24 July 2017
19:00

Thái Sơn Nam (Vietnam)	2–0	(United Arab Emirates) Al-Dhafra
Tayyebi 8', 16'	Report

Phú Thọ Indoor Stadium, Ho Chi Minh City
Attendance: 3,400
Referee: Liu Jianqiao (China)

=== Group B ===
Pos	Team	Pld	W	D	L	GF	GA	GD	Pts	Qualification
1	(Iraq) Naft Al-Wasat	3	3	0	0	17	7	+10	9	Knockout stage
2	(Qatar) Al Rayyan	3	2	0	1	6	6	0	6	Knockout stage
3	(Indonesia) Vamos Mataram	3	1	0	2	9	10	−1	3	
4	(Tajikistan) Disi Invest	3	0	0	3	5	14	−9	0	

Source: AFC
Rules for classification: Group stage tiebreakers
21 July 2017
16:30

Al Rayyan (Qatar)	2–1	(Indonesia) Vamos Mataram
Costa 8', 40'	Report	Saptaji 39'

Phú Thọ Indoor Stadium, Ho Chi Minh City
Attendance: 200
Referee: Hiroyuki Kobayashi (Japan)
21 July 2017
19:00

Naft Al-Wasat (Iraq)	7–2	(Tajikistan) Disi Invest
Bahadori 5', 7', 17', 18', 33'; Abed 31'; Eesa 37'	Report	Halimov 5'; Jonatan 33'

Phú Thọ Indoor Stadium, Ho Chi Minh City
Attendance: 100
Referee: Liu Jianqiao (China)

23 July 2017
16:30

Disi Invest (Tajikistan)	1–2	(Qatar) Al Rayyan
Nasrollahzadeh 30'	Report	Arantes 2'; Oliveira 17'

Phú Thọ Indoor Stadium, Ho Chi Minh City
Attendance: 200
Referee: Maiket Yuttakon (Thailand)
23 July 2017
19:00

Vamos Mataram (Indonesia)	3–6	(Iraq) Naft Al-Wasat
Saud 24'; Kustiawan 35', 40'	Report	Tavakoli 2'; Abed 13', 19'; Fahem 22'; Dakheel 26'; Eesa 28'

Phú Thọ Indoor Stadium, Ho Chi Minh City
Attendance: 100
Referee: Azat Hajypolatov (Turkmenistan)

25 July 2017
16:30

Vamos Mataram (Indonesia)	5–2	(Tajikistan) Disi Invest
Kustiawan 2', 8', 19'; Abedin 31', 34'	Report	Tillozoda 8'; Bekmurodov 39'

Phú Thọ Indoor Stadium, Ho Chi Minh City
Attendance: 150
Referee: Hussain Ali Al-Bahhar (Bahrain)
25 July 2017
19:00

Naft Al-Wasat (Iraq)	4–2	(Qatar) Al Rayyan
Fahem 1'; Tavakoli 1'; Bahadori 39', 40'	Report	Selim 27'; Taheri 36'

Phú Thọ Indoor Stadium, Ho Chi Minh City
Attendance: 100
Referee: Tomohiro Kozaki (Japan)

=== Group C ===
Pos	Team	Pld	W	D	L	GF	GA	GD	Pts	Qualification
1	(Iran) Giti Pasand Isfahan	2	2	0	0	10	2	+8	6	Knockout stage
2	(Japan) Shriker Osaka	2	1	0	1	7	4	+3	3	Knockout stage
3	(China) Shenzhen Nanling	2	0	0	2	1	12	−11	0	

Source: AFC
Rules for classification: Group stage tiebreakers
20 July 2017
14:00

Shenzhen Nanling (China)	1–5	(Japan) Shriker Osaka
Hafizi 6'	Report	Horigome 5'; Osodo 10'; Oliveira 16'; Shibano 22'; Sato 37'

Phú Thọ Indoor Stadium, Ho Chi Minh City
Attendance: 200
Referee: Rey Ritaga (Philippines)

22 July 2017
14:00

Giti Pasand Isfahan (Iran)	7–0	(China) Shenzhen Nanling
Zareei 6'; Hassanzadeh 6'; Esmaeilpour 7', 26', 30'; Keshavarz 14'; Jaberi 37'	Report

Phú Thọ Indoor Stadium, Ho Chi Minh City
Attendance: 250
Referee: Nurdin Bukuev (Kyrgyz Republic)

24 July 2017
14:00

Shriker Osaka (Japan)	2–3	(Iran) Giti Pasand Isfahan
Shibano 1', 30'	Report	Zareei 4', 10'; Hassanzadeh 40'

Phú Thọ Indoor Stadium, Ho Chi Minh City
Attendance: 200
Referee: Darius Turner (Australia)

=== Group D ===
Pos	Team	Pld	W	D	L	GF	GA	GD	Pts	Qualification
1	(Thailand) Chonburi Bluewave	2	2	0	0	14	0	+14	6	Knockout stage
2	(Lebanon) Bank of Beirut	2	1	0	1	8	12	−4	3	Knockout stage
3	(Uzbekistan) AGMK	2	0	0	2	3	13	−10	0	

Source: AFC
Rules for classification: Group stage tiebreakers
21 July 2017
14:00

Bank of Beirut (Lebanon)	0–9	(Thailand) Chonburi Bluewave
	Report	Jirawat 7', 9', 19', 26', 36'; Suphawut 16', 17'; Jetsada 31'; Peerapat 34'

Phú Thọ Indoor Stadium, Ho Chi Minh City
Attendance: 200
Referee: Tomohiro Kozaki (Japan)

23 July 2017
14:00

AGMK (Uzbekistan)	3–8	(Lebanon) Bank of Beirut
Irsaliev 18'; Yunusov 22'; Serhan 38' (o.g.)	Report	Tomić 5', 30'; Serhan 12'; Hammoud 26'; Zeid 30'; Dine 35'; Sviridov 38' (o.g.); Jafari 40'

Phú Thọ Indoor Stadium, Ho Chi Minh City
Attendance: 200
Referee: Trương Quốc Dũng (Vietnam)

25 July 2017
14:00

Chonburi Bluewave (Thailand)	5–0	(Uzbekistan) AGMK
Kritsada 1'; Suphawut 34'; Ronnachai 36'; Peerapat 38'; Apiwat 40'	Report

Phú Thọ Indoor Stadium, Ho Chi Minh City
Attendance: 250
Referee: Lee Po-fu (Chinese Taipei)

== Knockout stage ==
In the knockout stage, extra time and penalty shoot-out are used to decide the winner if necessary, except for the third place match where penalty shoot-out (no extra time) is used to decide the winner if necessary (Regulations Articles 14.1 and 15.1).

=== Bracket ===
Quarter-finals
27 July – Phú Thọ Stadium
(Thailand) Chonburi Bluewave	4
(Japan) Shriker Osaka	2
27 July – Phú Thọ Stadium
(Iraq) Naft Al-Wasat	0
(Vietnam) Thái Sơn Nam	4
27 July – Phú Thọ Stadium
(Iran) Giti Pasand Isfahan	2
(Lebanon) Bank of Beirut	0
27 July – Phú Thọ Stadium
(United Arab Emirates) Al-Dhafra	3
(Qatar) Al Rayyan	4

Semi-finals
28 July – Phú Thọ Stadium
(Thailand) Chonburi Bluewave	6
(Vietnam) Thái Sơn Nam	0
28 July – Phú Thọ Stadium
(Iran) Giti Pasand Isfahan	4
(Qatar) Al Rayyan	2

Final
30 July – Phú Thọ Stadium
(Thailand) Chonburi Bluewave	3
(Iran) Giti Pasand Isfahan	2
Third place match
30 July – Phú Thọ Stadium
(Vietnam) Thái Sơn Nam	6
(Qatar) Al Rayyan	1

=== Quarter-finals ===
27 July 2017
12:00

Chonburi Bluewave (Thailand)	4–2	(Japan) Shriker Osaka
Venâncio 8', 37'; Suphawut 10'; Jirawat 11'	Report	Shibano 33'; Sato 34'

Phú Thọ Indoor Stadium, Ho Chi Minh City
Attendance: 700
Referee: Mohamad Chami (Lebanon)

27 July 2017
14:30

Giti Pasand Isfahan (Iran)	2–0	(Lebanon) Bank of Beirut
Orouji 20'; Esmaeilpour 29'	Report

Phú Thọ Indoor Stadium, Ho Chi Minh City
Attendance: 700
Referee: Trương Quốc Dũng (Vietnam)

27 July 2017
17:00

Naft Al-Wasat (Iraq)	0–4	(Vietnam) Thái Sơn Nam
	Report	Trí 34', 36'; Vũ 38'; Hòa 40'

Phú Thọ Indoor Stadium, Ho Chi Minh City
Attendance: 3,600
Referee: Mahmoudreza Nasirloo (Iran)

27 July 2017
19:30

Al-Dhafra (United Arab Emirates)	3–4	(Qatar) Al Rayyan
Vassoura 17', 29'; Al-Jaberi 40'	Report	Costa 9', 11'; Taheri 25'; Arantes 35'

Phú Thọ Indoor Stadium, Ho Chi Minh City
Attendance: 500
Referee: Tomohiro Kozaki (Japan)

=== Semi-finals ===
28 July 2017
16:00

Chonburi Bluewave (Thailand)	6–0	(Vietnam) Thái Sơn Nam
Jirawat 2', 26' (pen.), 29'; Sorasak 14'; Kritsada 32'; Jetsada 40'	Report

Phú Thọ Indoor Stadium, Ho Chi Minh City
Attendance: 3,500
Referee: Liu Jianqiao (China)

28 July 2017
19:00

Giti Pasand Isfahan (Iran)	4–2	(Qatar) Al Rayyan
Esmaeilpour 3', 18'; Orouji 5'; Hassanzadeh 40'	Report	Arantes 15', 18'

Phú Thọ Indoor Stadium, Ho Chi Minh City
Attendance: 500
Referee: Nurdin Bukuev (Kyrgyz Republic)

=== Third place match ===
30 July 2017
16:00

Thái Sơn Nam (Vietnam)	6–1	(Qatar) Al Rayyan
Vũ 18'; Luân 31'; Tayyebi 33', 40'; Huy 37'; Baptista 38'	Report	Selim 6'

Phú Thọ Indoor Stadium, Ho Chi Minh City
Attendance: 2,500
Referee: Hiroyuki Kobayashi (Japan)

=== Final ===
30 July 2017
19:00

Chonburi Bluewave (Thailand)	3–2	(Iran) Giti Pasand Isfahan
Suphawut 13', 13', 22'	Report	Esmaeilpour 21'; Hassanzadeh 22'

Phú Thọ Indoor Stadium, Ho Chi Minh City
Attendance: 1,500
Referee: Trương Quốc Dũng (Vietnam)

== Tournament team rankings ==
As per statistical convention in football, matches decided in extra time are counted as wins and losses, while matches decided by penalty shoot-outs are counted as draws.

Pos	Team	Pld	W	D	L	GF	GA	GD	Pts	Final result
1st place, gold medalist(s)	(Thailand) Chonburi Bluewave	5	5	0	0	27	4	+23	15	Champions
2nd place, silver medalist(s)	(Iran) Giti Pasand Isfahan	5	4	0	1	18	7	+11	12	Runners-up
3rd place, bronze medalist(s)	(Vietnam) Thái Sơn Nam (H)	6	4	0	2	25	14	+11	12	Third place
4	(Qatar) Al Rayyan	6	3	0	3	13	19	−6	9	Fourth place
5	(United Arab Emirates) Al-Dhafra	4	2	0	2	11	7	+4	6	Eliminated in quarter-finals
6	(Japan) Shriker Osaka	3	1	0	2	9	8	+1	3	Eliminated in quarter-finals
7	(Lebanon) Bank of Beirut	3	1	0	2	8	14	−6	3	Eliminated in quarter-finals
8	(Iraq) Naft Al-Wasat	4	3	0	1	15	7	+8	9	Eliminated in quarter-finals
9	(Kyrgyzstan) EREM	3	2	0	1	6	8	−2	6	Eliminated in group stage
10	(Indonesia) Vamos Mataram	3	1	0	2	9	10	−1	3	Eliminated in group stage
11	(Uzbekistan) AGMK	2	0	0	2	3	13	−10	0	Eliminated in group stage
12	(China) Shenzhen Nanling	2	0	0	2	1	12	−11	0	Eliminated in group stage
13	(Tajikistan) Disi Invest	3	0	0	3	5	14	−9	0	Eliminated in group stage
14	(Australia) Vic Vipers	3	0	0	3	3	14	−11	0	Eliminated in group stage

Source: Pending
(H) Hosts

== Top goalscorers ==
Rank	Player	Team	Goals
1	(Thailand) Jirawat Sornwichian	(Thailand) Chonburi Bluewave	9
2	(Iran) Hossein Tayyebi	(Vietnam) Thái Sơn Nam	8
3	(Thailand) Suphawut Thueanklang	(Thailand) Chonburi Bluewave	7
3	(Iran) Ghodrat Bahadori	(Iraq) Naft Al-Wasat	7
3	(Iran) Ahmad Esmaeilpour	(Iran) Giti Pasand Isfahan	7
6	(Azerbaijan) Vassoura	(United Arab Emirates) Al-Dhafra	6
7	(Indonesia) Andri Kustiawan	(Indonesia) Vamos Mataram	5
8	(Brazil) Diego Costa	(Qatar) Al Rayyan	4
8	(Iran) Ali Asghar Hassanzadeh	(Iran) Giti Pasand Isfahan	4
8	(Qatar) Flavio Barreto Arantes	(Qatar) Al Rayyan	4
8	(Japan) Sota Shibano	(Japan) Shriker Osaka	4
8	(Vietnam) Lê Quốc Nam	(Vietnam) Thái Sơn Nam	4

Source: the-afc.com

== Awards ==
AFC Futsal Club Championship
2017 Champions

Chonburi Bluewave
Second Title

- Most Valuable Player
  - (Iran) Ali Asghar Hassanzadeh ( (Iran) Giti Pasand Isfahan)
- Top Scorer
  - (Thailand) Jirawat Sornwichian (9 goals)
- Fair Play Award
  - (Vietnam) Thái Sơn Nam
- All-Star Team
  - (Thailand) Katawut Hankampa (Chonburi Bluewave) (GK)
  - (Iran) Farhad Tavakoli (Naft Al-Wasat)
  - (Iran) Ali Asghar Hassanzadeh ( (Iran) Giti Pasand Isfahan)
  - (Brazil) Diego Costa (Al Rayyan)
  - (Thailand) Suphawut Thueanklang (Chonburi Bluewave)
- Reserve All-Star Team
  - (Iran) Sepehr Mohammadi Giti Pasand Isfahan) (GK)
  - (Thailand) Kritsada Wongkaeo (Chonburi Bluewave)
  - (Thailand) Jirawat Sornwichian (Chonburi Bluewave)
  - (Iran) Hossein Tayyebi (Thái Sơn Nam)
  - (Iran) Ahmad Esmaeilpour ( (Iran) Giti Pasand Isfahan)
  - Coach: (Thailand) Rakphol Sainetngam (Chonburi Bluewave)
