= 2021 in Japanese football =

Football in Japan
- Season: 2021

Men's football
- J1 League: Kawasaki Frontale
- J2 League: Júbilo Iwata
- J3 League: Roasso Kumamoto
- Japan Football League: Iwaki FC
- Japanese Regional Leagues: Criacao Shinjuku
- Emperor's Cup: Urawa Red Diamonds
- J.League Cup: Nagoya Grampus
- Super Cup: Kawasaki Frontale

Women's football
- Nadeshiko Division 1: Iga FC Kunoichi
- Nadeshiko Division 2: JFA Academy Fukushima

This article summarizes Japanese football in the 2021 season.

== National team results and fixtures ==
=== Men's ===
==== Senior ====
25 March 2021 Friendly	Japan	3–0	South Korea	Yokohama, Japan
19:20 UTC+9	Yamane 16'; Kamada 27'; Endo 83'	Report		Stadium: Nissan Stadium; Referee: Rowan Arumughan (India)

30 March 2021 2022 World Cup qualification	Mongolia	0–14	Japan	Chiba, Japan
19:20 UTC+9		Report	Minamino 13'; Osako 23', 55', 90+2'; Kamada 26'; Morita 33'; Tuya 39' (o.g.); Inagaki 68', 90+3'; Ito 73', 79'; Furuhashi 78', 87'; Asano 90+1'	Stadium: Fukuda Denshi Arena; Attendance: 0 Referee: Omar Mohamed Al-Ali (United Arab Emirates)

28 May 2021 2022 World Cup qualification	Japan	10–0	Myanmar	Chiba, Japan
19:30 UTC+9	Minamino 8', 66'; Osako 22', 30' (pen.), 36', 49', 88'; Morita 56'; Kamada 84'; Itakura 90'	Report		Stadium: Fukuda Denshi Arena; Attendance: 0 Referee: Hasan Akrami (Iran)

7 June 2021 2022 World Cup qualification	Japan	4–1	Tajikistan	Suita, Japan
19:30 UTC+9	Furuhashi 6'; Minamino 40'; Hashimoto 51'; Kawabe 70'	Report	Panjshanbe 9'	Stadium: Panasonic Stadium; Attendance: 0 Referee: Abdulrehman Al Jassim (Qatar)

11 June 2021 Kirin Challenge Cup	Japan	1–0	Serbia	Kobe, Japan
19:25 UTC+9	Ito 48'	Report		Stadium: Noevir Stadium Kobe; Referee: Payam Heidari (Iran)

15 June 2021 2022 World Cup qualification	Japan	5–1	Kyrgyzstan	Suita, Japan
19:30 UTC+9	Onaiwu 27' (pen.), 31', 33'; Sasaki 72'; Asano 77'	Report	Murzaev 45+2' (pen.)	Stadium: Panasonic Stadium; Attendance: 0 Referee: Omar Al-Yaqoubi (Oman)

2 September 2021 2022 World Cup qualification	Japan	0–1	Oman	Suita, Japan
19:15 UTC+9		Report	Al-Sabhi 88'	Stadium: Suita City Football Stadium; Referee: Mohammed Abdulla Hassan Mohamed (United Arab Emirates)

7 September 2021 2022 World Cup qualification	China	0–1	Japan	Doha, Qatar
18:00 UTC+3		Report	Osako 40'	Stadium: Khalifa International Stadium; Attendance: 0 Referee: Nawaf Shukralla (Bahrain)

7 October 2021 2022 World Cup qualification	Saudi Arabia	1–0	Japan	Jeddah, Saudi Arabia
20:00 UTC+3	Al-Buraikan 71'	Report		Stadium: King Abdullah Sports City; Attendance: 51,218; Referee: Adham Makhadmeh (Jordan)

12 October 2021 2022 World Cup qualification	Japan	2–1	Australia	Saitama, Japan
19:14 UTC+9	Tanaka 8'; Behich 85' (o.g.)	Report	Hrustic 70'	Stadium: Saitama Stadium 2002; Attendance: 14,437; Referee: Abdulrahman Al-Jassim (Qatar)

11 November 2021 2022 World Cup qualification	Vietnam	0–1	Japan	Hanoi, Vietnam
19:00 UTC+7		Report	Ito 17'	Stadium: Mỹ Đình National Stadium; Attendance: 11,022; Referee: Mohammed Abdulla Hassan Mohamed (United Arab Emirates)

16 November 2021 2022 World Cup qualification	Oman	0–1	Japan	Muscat, Oman
20:00 UTC+4		Report	Ito 81'	Stadium: Sultan Qaboos Sports Complex; Referee: Ko Hyung-jin (South Korea)

==== U-23 ====
Japan national under-23 football team results (2020–present)

==== U-20 ====
The 2020 AFC U-19 Championship was cancelled after the draw for the group stage was conducted.

March 2021 2020 AFC U-19 Championship Group Stage	Japan	Cancelled	Iraq	Tashkent, Uzbekistan
				Stadium: Lokomotiv Stadium

March 2021 2020 AFC U-19 Championship Group Stage	Bahrain	Cancelled	Japan	Tashkent, Uzbekistan
				Stadium: Lokomotiv Stadium

March 2021 2020 AFC U-19 Championship Group Stage	South Korea	Cancelled	Japan	Tashkent, Uzbekistan
				Stadium: Lokomotiv Stadium

18 December IBARAKI Next Generation Match 2021 1st Round	Kashima Antlers Youth (Japan)	2–6	Japan	Hitachinaka, Japan
11:00	Kai Kikuchi 60'; Keita Imai 90+1'	Report (JFA)	Jiro Nakamura 3'; Isa Sakamoto 13', 19'; Taishin Yamazaki 39'; Koki Toyoda 55'; Kanta Chiba 85'	Stadium: Hitachinaka Athletics Stadium

19 December IBARAKI Next Generation Match 2021 Final	Japan	1–2	(Japan) U-20 Kanto University Selection	Hitachinaka, Japan
14:00	Kanta Chiba 41'	Report (JFA)	unknown 61', 87'	Stadium: Hitachinaka Athletics Stadium

==== U-17 ====
2–6 June U-16 International Dream Cup	Japan	Cancelled	Japan
		Cancellation

2–6 June U-16 International Dream Cup	Japan	Cancelled	Japan
		Cancellation

2–6 June U-16 International Dream Cup	Japan	Cancelled	Japan
		Cancellation

- Fixtures & Results – JFA.jp
- 2021 schedules – JFA.jp (as of 16 December 2020)

==== Futsal ====
19 August 2021 Friendly	Portugal	3–2	Japan	Rio Maior, Portugal
19:00 *Local time	? 25'; ? 29'; ? 37'	Report (JFA)	Shimizu 21'; Henmi 28'	Stadium: Pavilhao Polidesportivo Rio Maior Sports Centre

22 August 2021 Friendly	Japan	2–2	Venezuela	Rio Maior, Portugal
19:00 *Local time	Murota 7'; Arthur 16'	Report (JFA)	? 16'; ? 39'	Stadium: Pavilhão Polidesportivo Rio Maior

25 August 2021 Friendly	Argentina	2–1	Japan	Jaén, Spain
20:30 *Local time	? 1'; ? 6'	Report (JFA)	Shimizu 29'	Stadium: Palacio de deportes Olivo Arena

29 August 2021 Friendly	Japan	1–0	Vietnam	Jaén, Spain
18:00 *Local time	Shimizu 36'	Report (JFA)		Stadium: Palacio de deportes Olivo Arena

31 August 2021 Friendly	Spain	2–0	Japan	Jaén, Spain
20:15 *Local time		Report (JFA)		Stadium: Palacio de deportes Olivo Arena

7 September 2021 Friendly	Japan	3–0	Morocco	Lithuania
		Report (JFA)

14 September 2021 FIFA Futsal World Cup GS Group E	Angola	4–8	Japan	Klaipėda, Lithuania
20:00 EEST (UTC+3)	Guga 19', 21'; R. Hoshi 24' (o.g.); Kaluanda 29'	Report (FIFA); Report (JFA)	Oliveira 13', 20', 23', 37'; Murota 14'; R. Hoshi 25'; Nishitani 25'; S. Hoshi 40'	Stadium: Švyturys Arena; Attendance: 607; Referee: Diego López (Costa Rica)

17 September 2021 FIFA Futsal World Cup GS Group E	Spain	4–2	Japan	Klaipėda, Lithuania
18:00 EEST (UTC+3)	Díaz 4'; Chino 26'; Campos 30'; Tolrà 39'	Report (FIFA); Report (JFA)	S. Hoshi 5'; Henmi 8'	Stadium: Švyturys Arena; Attendance: 712; Referee: Valeria Palma (Chile)

20 September 2021 FIFA Futsal World Cup GS Group E	Japan	1–2	Paraguay	Vilnius, Lithuania
18:00 EEST (UTC+3)	Shimizu 3'	Report (FIFA); Report (JFA)	Mareco 7'; J. Salas 33'	Stadium: Avia Solutions Group Arena; Attendance: 792; Referee: Roberto López (Panama)

23 September 2021 FIFA Futsal World Cup Round of 16	Brazil	4–2	Japan	Kaunas, Lithuania
20:00 EEST (UTC+3)	Ferrão 5'; Leozinho 31'; Pito 38'; Kato 40' (o.g.)	Report (FIFA); Report (JFA)	S. Hoshi 4'; Nishitani 38'	Stadium: Žalgiris Arena; Attendance: 918; Referee: Irina Velikanova (Russia)

- Fixtures & Results (Futsal 2021), JFA.jp

==== Beach soccer ====
19 August 2021 FIFA Beach Soccer World Cup GS Group A	Paraguay	4–7	Japan	Moscow, Russia
16:30 UTC+3	Cantero 10'; N. Medina 10', 13'; Morán 27'	Report (BSWW); Report (FIFA); Report (JFA)	Ojeda 21' (o.g.); Akaguma 26', 32', 32'; Yamauchi 29', 33' (pen.), 36'	Stadium: Luzhniki Beach Soccer Stadium; Attendance: 598; Referee: Francisco de Oses Bumedien (Spain)

21 August 2021 FIFA Beach Soccer World Cup GS Group A	Japan	4–3	United States	Moscow, Russia
16:30 UTC+3	Okuyama 4'; Ozu 23'; Oba 28' (pen.); Yamauchi 31'	Report (BSWW); Report (FIFA); Report (JFA)	Silveira 3'; Canale 29'; Perea 34'	Stadium: Luzhniki Beach Soccer Stadium; Attendance: 1,507; Referee: Aurélien Planchais-Godefroy (Tahiti)

23 August 2021 FIFA Beach Soccer World Cup GS Group A	Japan	1–7	RFU	Moscow, Russia
20:30 UTC+3	Akaguma 32'	Report (BSWW); Report (FIFA); Report (JFA)	Ozu 1' (o.g.); Paporotnyi 3', 25', 27'; Zemskov 8'; Chuzhkov 15'; Nikonorov 36'	Stadium: Luzhniki Beach Soccer Stadium; Attendance: 2,500; Referee: Micke Palomino (Peru)

26 August 2021 FIFA Beach Soccer World Cup Quarter-finals	Tahiti	4–5 (a.e.t.)	Japan	Moscow, Russia
19:00 UTC+3	Tetauira 20' (pen.), 37'; Chan-Kat 30'; Uesato 36' (o.g.)	Report (BSWW); Report (FIFA); Report (JFA)	Tehau 4' (o.g.); Yamauchi 5' (pen.); Oba 36'; Okuyama 37'; Akaguma 38'	Stadium: Luzhniki Beach Soccer Stadium

28 August 2021 FIFA Beach Soccer World Cup Semi-finals	Japan	5–2	Senegal	Moscow, Russia
19:30 UTC+3	Akaguma 15' (pen.), 29', 33'; Oba 27'; Okuyama 27'	Report (BSWW); Report (FIFA); Report (JFA)	Fall 26'; Boye 32'	Stadium: Luzhniki Beach Soccer Arena; Attendance: 1,950; Referee: Łukasz Ostrowski (Poland)

29 August 2021 FIFA Beach Soccer World Cup Final	RFU	5–2	Japan	Moscow, Russia
19:30 UTC+3	Zemskov 4'; Krasheninnikov 13', 34'; Nivikov 15'; Paporotnyi 19'	Report (BSWW); Report (FIFA); Report (JFA)	Akaguma 13', 17' (pen.)	Stadium: Luzhniki Beach Soccer Arena; Attendance: 2,500; Referee: Suhaimi Mat Hassan (Malaysia)

2 November 2021 Tecnotree Intercontinental Beach Soccer Cup	Russia	7–6	Japan	Dubai, United Arab Emirates
18:45 UTC+4		Report (BSWW); Report (JFA)		Stadium: Kite Beach

3 November 2021 Tecnotree Intercontinental Beach Soccer Cup	Iran	6–1	Japan	Dubai, United Arab Emirates
20:00 UTC+4		Report (BSWW); Report (JFA)		Stadium: Kite Beach

4 November 2021 Tecnotree Intercontinental Beach Soccer Cup	Japan	4–6 (a.e.t.)	Paraguay	Dubai, United Arab Emirates
16:00 UTC+4		Report (BSWW); Report (JFA)		Stadium: Kite Beach

5 November 2021 Tecnotree Intercontinental Beach Soccer Cup (5th–8th place semi-finals)	United Arab Emirates	4–6	Japan
17:15		Report(BSWW); Report(JFA)

6 November 2021 Tecnotree Intercontinental Beach Soccer Cup (5th place play-off)	Japan	5–4	Spain
16:15		Report(BSWW); Report(JFA)

- Fixtures & Results (Beach soccer 2021)

=== Women's ===
==== Senior ====
8 April Friendly	Japan	7–0	Paraguay	Sendai, Japan
16:30 UTC+9	Minami 6'; Iwabuchi 26', 63'; Bogarin 36' (o.g.); Sugasawa 52'; Momiki 90+2'; Tanaka 90+3'	Report (JFA); Report (JFA); Report (SW)		Stadium: Yurtec Stadium Sendai; Attendance: 818; Referee: Yoshimi Yamashita (Japan)

11 April Friendly	Japan	7–0	Panama	Tokyo, Japan
13:30 UTC+9	Sugasawa 8', 42', 56'; Shimizu 17'; Hasegawa 32'; Momiki 45'; Sugita 61'	Report (JFA); Report (JFA); Report (SW)		Stadium: Japan National Stadium; Attendance: 4,036; Referee: Azusa Sugino (Japan)

10 June Friendly	Japan	8–0	Ukraine	Hiroshima, Japan
15:15 UTC+9	Shiokoshi 5', 41'; Iwabuchi 30', 58'; Takarada 38'; Sugita 80'; Tanaka 89' (pen.); Momiki 90'	Report (JFA); Report (JFA); Report (SW)		Stadium: Edion Stadium Hiroshima; Attendance: 796; Referee: Yoshimi Yamashita (Japan)

13 June MS&AD CUP	Japan	5–1	Mexico	Utsunomiya, Japan
14:00 UTC+9	Iwabuchi 36'; Tanaka 46'; Momiki 54'; Kinoshita 74'; Endo 88'	Report (JFA); Report (JFA); Report (FMF); Report (SW)	González 49'	Stadium: Kanseki Stadium Tochigi; Attendance: 3,890; Referee: Asaka Koizumi (England)

14 July MS&AD CUP	Japan	1–0	Australia	Kameoka, Japan
19:20 UTC+9	Iwabuchi 54' (pen.)	Report (JFA); Report (JFA); Report (FA); Report (SW)		Stadium: Sanga Stadium by Kyocera; Attendance: 2,584; Referee: Azusa Sugino (Japan)

21 July Olympics GS	Japan	1–1	Canada	Sapporo, Japan
19:30 UTC+9	Iwabuchi 84'	Report (TOCOG); Report (FIFA); Report (JFA); Report (SW)	Sinclair 6'	Stadium: Sapporo Dome; Attendance: 0 Referee: Edina Alves Batista (Brazil)

24 July Olympics GS	Japan	0–1	Great Britain	Sapporo, Japan
19:30 UTC+9		Report (TOCOG); Report (FIFA); Report (JFA); Report (SW)	White 74'	Stadium: Sapporo Dome; Attendance: 0 Referee: Anastasia Pustovoitova (Russia)

27 July Olympics GS	Chile	0–1	Japan	Rifu, Japan
20:00 UTC+9		Report (TOCOG); Report (FIFA); Report (JFA); Report (SW)	Tanaka 77'	Stadium: Miyagi Stadium; Attendance: 1,326; Referee: Melissa Borjas (Honduras)

30 July Olympics QF	Sweden	3–1	Japan	Saitama, Japan
19:00 UTC+9	Eriksson 7'; Blackstenius 53'; Asllani 68' (pen.)	Report (TOCOG); Report (FIFA); Report (JFA); Report (SW)	Tanaka 23'	Stadium: Saitama Stadium 2002; Attendance: 0 Referee: Lucila Venegas (Mexico)

25 November Friendly	Japan	0–2	Iceland	Almere, Netherlands
TBD CET (UTC+1)		Report (JFA); Report (JFA); Report (Soccerway)	S. Jónsdóttir 14'; Torvalsdottir 70'	Stadium: Yanmar Stadion

29 November Friendly	Netherlands	0–0	Japan	The Hague, Netherlands
19:40 CET (UTC+1)		Report (JFA); Report (Soccerway)		Stadium: Cars Jeans Stadion

== Club competitions ==
=== Men's ===
==== Promotion and relegation ====
League	Promoted to league	Relegated from league
J1 League	Tokushima Vortis ▲; Avispa Fukuoka ▲	No relegation
J2 League	Blaublitz Akita ▲; SC Sagamihara ▲	No relegation
J3 League	Tegevajaro Miyazaki ▲	No relegation
Japan Football League	Criacao Shinjuku ▲	No relegation

==== J1 League ====
Pos	Team	Pld	W	D	L	GF	GA	GD	Pts	Qualification or relegation
1	Kawasaki Frontale (C)	38	28	8	2	81	28	+53	92	Qualification for the AFC Champions League group stage
2	Yokohama F. Marinos	38	24	7	7	82	35	+47	79	Qualification for the AFC Champions League group stage
3	Vissel Kobe	38	21	10	7	62	36	+26	73	Qualification for the AFC Champions League play-off round
4	Kashima Antlers	38	21	6	11	62	36	+26	69	
5	Nagoya Grampus	38	19	9	10	44	30	+14	66	
6	Urawa Red Diamonds	38	18	9	11	45	38	+7	63 (Note: The JPFL awarded a 3–0 win to Shonan Bellmare after Urawa Red Diamonds fielded Zion Suzuki who was an ineligible player. The original score was 3–2 for Shonan Bellmare.)	Qualification for the AFC Champions League group stage (Note: Qualified as the 2021 Emperor's Cup winners.)
7	Sagan Tosu	38	16	11	11	43	35	+8	59	
8	Avispa Fukuoka	38	14	12	12	42	37	+5	54	
9	FC Tokyo	38	15	8	15	49	53	−4	53	
10	Hokkaido Consadole Sapporo	38	14	9	15	48	50	−2	51	
11	Sanfrecce Hiroshima	38	12	13	13	44	42	+2	49	
12	Cerezo Osaka	38	13	9	16	47	51	−4	48	
13	Gamba Osaka	38	12	8	18	33	49	−16	44	
14	Shimizu S-Pulse	38	10	12	16	37	54	−17	42	
15	Kashiwa Reysol	38	12	5	21	37	56	−19	41	
16	Shonan Bellmare	38	7	16	15	36	41	−5	37	
17	Tokushima Vortis (R)	38	10	6	22	34	55	−21	36	Relegation to the J2 League
18	Oita Trinita (R)	38	9	8	21	31	55	−24	35	Relegation to the J2 League
19	Vegalta Sendai (R)	38	5	13	20	31	62	−31	28	Relegation to the J2 League
20	Yokohama FC (R)	38	6	9	23	32	77	−45	27	Relegation to the J2 League

Source: Meiji Yasuda J1 League, J.League Data Site
Rules for classification: 1) Points; 2) Goal difference; 3) Goals scored; 4) Head-to-head points; 5) Head-to-head goal difference; 6) Head-to-head goal scored; 7) Fair-play points.
(C) Champions; (R) Relegation to the J2 League

==== J2 League ====
Pos	Team	Pld	W	D	L	GF	GA	GD	Pts	Promotion
1	Júbilo Iwata (C, P)	42	27	10	5	75	42	+33	91	Promotion to J1 League
2	Kyoto Sanga (P)	42	24	12	6	59	31	+28	84	Promotion to J1 League
3	Ventforet Kofu	42	23	11	8	65	38	+27	80	
4	V-Varen Nagasaki	42	23	9	10	69	44	+25	78	
5	Machida Zelvia	42	20	12	10	64	38	+26	72	
6	Albirex Niigata	42	18	14	10	61	40	+21	68	
7	Montedio Yamagata	42	20	8	14	61	49	+12	68	
8	JEF United Chiba	42	17	15	10	48	36	+12	66	
9	FC Ryukyu	42	18	11	13	57	47	+10	65	
10	Mito HollyHock	42	16	11	15	59	50	+9	59	
11	Fagiano Okayama	42	15	14	13	40	36	+4	59	
12	Tokyo Verdy	42	16	10	16	62	66	−4	58	
13	Blaublitz Akita (Note: The team did not hold a J1 license, and so was ineligible for promotion to the 2022 J1 League.)	42	11	14	17	41	53	−12	47	
14	Tochigi SC	42	10	15	17	37	51	−14	45	
15	Renofa Yamaguchi	42	10	13	19	37	51	−14	43	
16	Omiya Ardija	42	9	15	18	51	56	−5	42	
17	Zweigen Kanazawa	42	10	11	21	39	60	−21	41	
18	Thespakusatsu Gunma	42	9	14	19	35	56	−21	41	
19	SC Sagamihara (R)	42	8	14	20	33	54	−21	38	Relegation to J3 League
20	Ehime FC (R)	42	7	14	21	38	67	−29	35	Relegation to J3 League
21	Giravanz Kitakyushu (R)	42	7	14	21	35	66	−31	35	Relegation to J3 League
22	Matsumoto Yamaga (R)	42	7	13	22	36	71	−35	34	Relegation to J3 League

Source: Meiji Yasuda J2 League, J.League Data Site
Rules for classification: 1) Points; 2) Goal difference; 3) Goals scored; 4) Head-to-head points; 5) Head-to-head goal difference; 6) Head-to-head goal scored; 7) Fair-play points.
(C) Champions; (P) Promoted; (R) Relegated

==== J3 League ====
Pos	Team	Pld	W	D	L	GF	GA	GD	Pts	Promotion
1	Roasso Kumamoto (C, P)	28	15	9	4	39	20	+19	54	Promotion to J2 League (Note: Only teams that hold a J2 license are eligible for promotion.)
2	Iwate Grulla Morioka (P)	28	15	8	5	43	28	+15	53	Promotion to J2 League
3	Tegevajaro Miyazaki (Note: The team held neither a J1 nor J2 license, and so was ineligible for promotion to the J2 League.)	28	16	5	7	44	31	+13	53	
4	Kataller Toyama	28	13	7	8	40	34	+6	46	
5	Fukushima United	28	13	6	9	41	32	+9	45 (Note: The match between Fukushima United and Vanraure Hachinohe resulted in a 2–0 win for Fukushima, but was changed to an awarded 0–3 scoreline by the J.League, after Fukushima allowed a player who had not received a negative test to play in the game. The original result was restored following a decision by the JFA Appeal Committee.)	
6	FC Gifu	28	12	5	11	38	35	+3	41	
7	Kagoshima United	28	11	7	10	34	35	−1	40	
8	YSCC Yokohama	28	11	7	10	31	33	−2	40	
9	Nagano Parceiro	28	8	12	8	35	28	+7	36	
10	Fujieda MYFC	28	8	8	12	42	42	0	32	
11	FC Imabari	28	7	9	12	34	33	+1	30	
12	Gainare Tottori	28	9	2	17	36	53	−17	29	
13	Vanraure Hachinohe	28	7	8	13	24	44	−20	29	
14	Azul Claro Numazu	28	7	6	15	32	44	−12	27	
15	Kamatamare Sanuki	28	4	9	15	20	41	−21	21	

Source: 2021 MEIJI YASUDA J3 LEAGUE League table, J.League Data Site
Rules for classification: 1) Points; 2) Goal difference; 3) Head-to-head points; 4) Head-to-head goal difference; 5) Head-to-head goal scored; 6) Number of wins; 7) Goals scored; 8) Fair-play points
(C) Champions; (P) Promoted

==== Japan Football League ====
Pos	Team	Pld	W	D	L	GF	GA	GD	Pts	Promotion or qualification
1	**Iwaki FC** (Note: J.League 100 Year Plan clubs) (C, P)	32	21	8	3	65	28	+37	71	Promotion to J3 League (Note: Promotion was conditional on holding a J3 license (marked in bold in the table), finishing in the top 4 of the JFL, and finishing in the top 2 of the J.League 100 Year Plan clubs.)
2	Honda FC	32	20	7	5	69	25	+44	67	
3	Verspah Oita	32	19	5	8	46	24	+22	62	
4	**Suzuka Point Getters**	32	15	5	12	51	46	+5	50	
5	Matsue City	32	14	8	10	38	37	+1	50	
6	Sony Sendai	32	14	6	12	52	39	+13	48	
7	**F.C. Osaka**	32	13	9	10	37	35	+2	48	
8	Tiamo Hirakata	32	14	6	12	58	57	+1	48	
9	**ReinMeer Aomori**	32	12	9	11	41	49	−8	45	
10	**Nara Club**	32	10	13	9	39	36	+3	43	
11	**Veertien Mie**	32	10	10	12	40	43	−3	40	
12	MIO Biwako Shiga	32	10	7	15	35	48	−13	37	
13	Kochi United	32	9	6	17	30	49	−19	33	
14	Maruyasu Okazaki	32	8	9	15	27	46	−19	33	
15	Tokyo Musashino United	32	9	5	18	38	53	−15	32	
16	Honda Lock (O)	32	6	9	17	26	48	−22	27	Qualification for relegation play-offs (Note: Relegation will occur as follows. In case of 1 team promoted to J3: Japan Regional Football Champions League winners will play the 17th-placed team in JFL, and runners-up will also play the 16th-placed team in JFL.)
17	FC Kariya (R)	32	4	6	22	26	55	−29	18	Qualification for relegation play-offs

Updated to match(es) played on 28 November 2021. Source: JFL website (in Japanese)
Rules for classification: 1) Points; 2) goal difference; 3) goals scored; 4) head-to-head results (a. points, b. goal difference, c. goals scored); 5) number of wins; 6) disciplinary points; 7) play-off (if necessary)
(C) Champions; (O) Play-off winners; (P) Promoted; (R) Relegated

=== Women's ===
==== WE League ====
Pos	Team	Pld	W	D	L	GF	GA	GD	Pts	Qualification or relegation
1	INAC Kobe Leonessa	20	16	2	2	35	9	+26	50	League Winner
2	Urawa Red Diamonds	20	13	3	4	40	24	+16	42	
3	Tokyo Verdy Beleza	20	10	4	6	32	18	+14	34	
4	JEF United Chiba	20	9	7	4	26	18	+8	34	
5	Mynavi Sendai	20	9	4	7	25	16	+9	31	
6	Sanfrecce Hiroshima Regina	20	7	4	9	24	26	−2	25	
7	AC Nagano Parceiro	20	5	6	9	15	24	−9	21	
8	Albirex Niigata	20	4	7	9	20	30	−10	19	
9	Omiya Ardija Ventus	20	3	9	8	17	31	−14	18	
10	Nojima Stella Kanagawa	20	2	7	11	13	31	−18	13	
11	AS Elfen Saitama	20	2	7	11	13	33	−20	13	

Source: WE League, WE League Data Site
Rules for classification: 1) Points; 2) Goal difference; 3) Number of goals scored.
