= Tajikistan Futsal Cup =

- Founded: 2013; 13 years ago
- Region: Tajikistan
- Teams: 8
- Current champions: Disi Invest Dushanbe (2nd title)
- Most championships: Disi Invest Dushanbe (2 titles)

The Tajikistan Futsal Cup, is the top knockout tournament of Tajikistan futsal and the second most important futsal competition in Tajikistan after the Tajikistan Futsal League. It is organized by the Tajikistan Football Federation and was established in the 2013 season.

== Cup winners ==
- 2013: DISI Invest Dushanbe
- 2014: Dinamo Dushanbe
- 2015-16: DISI Invest Dushanbe
- 2016-2017: DISI Invest Dushanbe

== League Cup winners ==
- 2018: Sipar Khujand

== Super Cup winners ==
- 2013: DISI Invest Dushanbe
- 2014: Natsbank Dushanbe

== See also ==
- Tajikistan Futsal League
- AFC Futsal club championship
- Tajikistan Football Federation
- Tajikistan national futsal team
