= 2023 AFF Futsal Club Championship =

International futsal competition

AFF Futsal Club Championship 2023
เอเอฟเอฟ ฟุตซอล คลับ แชมเปี้ยนชิพ 2023

Tournament details
- Host country: Thailand
- City: Nakhon Ratchasima
- Dates: 1–7 May
- Teams: 6 (from 1 sub-confederation)
- Venue: 1 (in 1 host city)

Final positions
- Champions: (Indonesia) Black Steel Papua
- Runners-up: (Thailand) Hongyen Thakam
- Third place: (Vietnam) Thái Sơn Nam
- Fourth place: (Malaysia) Pahang Rangers

Tournament statistics
- Matches played: 10
- Goals scored: 49 (4.9 per match)
- Top scorer(s): (Indonesia) Evan Soumilena (7 goals)
- Best player: (Brazil) Wendel Mendes
- Best goalkeeper: (Indonesia) Muhammad Albagir
- Fair play award: (Thailand) Hongyen Thakam

The 2023 AFF Futsal Club Championship was the eighth edition of AFF Futsal Club Championship. The tournament was held in Nakhon Ratchasima, Thailand from 1 to 7 May 2023.

== Participants ==
=== Group A ===
Association	Team
Thailand	Hongyen Thakam (Host)
Malaysia	Pahang Rangers
Myanmar	Victoria University College

=== Group B ===
Association	Team
Indonesia	Black Steel Papua
Vietnam	Thái Sơn Nam
Australia	Football Victoria

== Group stage ==
All times are local time: UTC+7.

=== Group A ===
Pos	Team	Pld	W	D	L	GF	GA	GD	Pts	Result
1	(Thailand) Hongyen Thakam (H)	2	2	0	0	7	3	+4	6	Advance to Knockout stage
2	(Malaysia) Pahang Rangers	2	1	0	1	5	6	−1	3	Advance to Knockout stage
3	(Myanmar) Victoria University College	2	0	0	2	5	8	−3	0	

Source: AFF
(H) Hosts

==== Match ====
1 May 2023
17:00

Victoria University College (Myanmar)	2–4	(Thailand) Hongyen Thakam
Tota 5'; Htut Wai Htun 35'	Report	Atippong 9'; Gomes 12'; Wendel 25'; Therdsak 39'

Terminal 21 Hall Korat, Nakhon Ratchasima
2 May 2023
17:00

Hongyen Thakam (Thailand)	3–1	(Malaysia) Pahang Rangers
Wendel 14'; Gomes 25'; Jaroenpong 40'	Report	Nasrollah 22'

Terminal 21 Hall Korat, Nakhon Ratchasima
3 May 2023
17:00

Pahang Rangers (Malaysia)	4–3	(Myanmar) Victoria University College
Gonzalez 1'; Idris 2'; Shamil 5'; Bakri 28'	Report	Aung Zin Oo 29', 31'; Khairuddin 30' (o.g.)

Terminal 21 Hall Korat, Nakhon Ratchasima

=== Group B ===
Pos	Team	Pld	W	D	L	GF	GA	GD	Pts	Result
1	(Indonesia) Black Steel Papua	2	2	0	0	9	1	+8	6	Advance to Knockout stage
2	(Vietnam) Thái Sơn Nam	2	1	0	1	4	5	−1	3	Advance to Knockout stage
3	(Australia) Football Victoria	2	0	0	2	1	8	−7	0	

Source: AFF

==== Match ====
1 May 2023
14:30

Football Victoria (Australia)	0–5	(Indonesia) Black Steel Papua
	Report	Amos 12'; Wendy 15'; Soumilena 25', 36'; Piter 40'

Terminal 21 Hall Korat, Nakhon Ratchasima
2 May 2023
14:30

Black Steel Papua (Indonesia)	4–1	(Vietnam) Thái Sơn Nam
Amos 4'; Sulistyo 11'; Soumilena 34'; Nur 37'	Report	Từ Minh Quang 25'

Terminal 21 Hall Korat, Nakhon Ratchasima
3 May 2023
14:30

Thái Sơn Nam (Vietnam)	3–1	(Australia) Football Victoria
Trần Văn Vũ 7' (pen.); Từ Minh Quang 8', 38'	Report	Ali 3'

Terminal 21 Hall Korat, Nakhon Ratchasima

== Knockout stage ==
Semi-final
05 May
(Thailand) Hongyen Thakam	5
(Vietnam) Thái Sơn Nam	1
05 May
(Indonesia) Black Steel Papua	7
(Malaysia) Pahang Rangers	0

Final
07 May
(Thailand) Hongyen Thakam	1 (3)
(Indonesia) Black Steel Papua	1 (4)
Third Place
07 May
(Vietnam) Thái Sơn Nam	3
(Malaysia) Pahang Rangers	0

=== Match ===
Semi Final

5 May 2023
14:30

Black Steel Papua (Indonesia)	7–0	(Malaysia) Pahang Rangers
Sulistyo 8'; Soumilena 13', 25', 37'; Diego 17'; Nur 22'; Piter 30'	Report

Terminal 21 Hall Korat, Nakhon Ratchasima
5 May 2023
17:00

Hongyen Thakam (Thailand)	5–1	(Vietnam) Thái Sơn Nam
Songkhrao 21'; Therdsak 22', 27'; Matwises 29', 36'	Report	Nguyễn Minh Trí 38'

Terminal 21 Hall Korat, Nakhon Ratchasima

Third Place

7 May 2023
14:30

Thái Sơn Nam (Vietnam)	3–0	(Malaysia) Pahang Rangers
Nguyễn Anh Duy 18'; Từ Minh Quang 21'; Bakri 33' (o.g.)	Report

Terminal 21 Hall Korat, Nakhon Ratchasima

Final

7 May 2023
17:00

Hongyen Thakam (Thailand)	1–1	(Indonesia) Black Steel Papua
Therdsak 1'	Report	Soumilena 32'
Penalties
Gomes (penalty scored); Wendel (penalty missed); Therdsak (penalty scored); Wittaya (penalty scored); Atippong (penalty missed)	3–4	Diego (penalty scored); Nur (penalty scored); Soumilena (penalty scored); Henrique (penalty scored)

Terminal 21 Hall Korat, Nakhon Ratchasima

== Winner ==
2023 AFF Futsal Club Championship Winner
(Indonesia)
Black Steel Papua
First title

== Goalscorers ==
There were 49 goals scored in 10 matches, for an average of 4.9 goals per match.

7 goals

- (Indonesia) Evan Soumilena

4 goals

- (Thailand) Therdsak Charoenphong
- (Vietnam) Từ Minh Quang

2 goals

- (Brazil) Rian Gomes
- (Brazil) Wendel Mendes
- (Indonesia) Ardiansyah Nur
- (Indonesia) Guntur Sulistyo
- (Indonesia) Piter Masriat Junior
- (Indonesia) Samuel Amos
- (Myanmar) Aung Zin Oo

1 goal

- (Brazil) Diego De Menezes
- (Brazil) Matheus Gonzalez
- (Brazil) Tota
- (Indonesia) Wendy Brian Ick
- (Iran) Amin Nasrollah
- (Malaysia) Akmarulnizam Mohd Idris
- (Malaysia) Mohamad Sufri Shamil
- (Malaysia) Mohd Ridzwan Bakri
- (Myanmar) Htut Wai Htun
- (New Zealand) Rahan Ali
- (Thailand) Atippong Munphlai
- (Thailand) Bunmee Matwises
- (Thailand) Jaroenpong Prasansat
- (Thailand) Keattisak Songkhrao
- (Vietnam) Nguyễn Minh Trí
- (Vietnam) Trần Văn Vũ
- (Vietnam) Nguyễn Anh Duy

1 own goal

- (Malaysia) Mohd Ridzwan Bakri
- (Malaysia) Mahadir Harahap Khairuddin

== See also ==
- AFF Futsal Club Championship
