= UAE Futsal Cup =

- Founded: 2009; 17 years ago
- Region: United Arab Emirates
- Teams: 8
- Current champions: Al Dhafrah (3rd title)
- Most championships: Al Dhafrah (3 titles)

The UAE Futsal Cup, is the top knockout tournament of the United Arab Emirates futsal and the second most important futsal competition in the United Arab Emirates after the UAE Futsal League. It is organized by the United Arab Emirates Football Association and was established in the 2009 season.

== Cup Winners ==
- 2018: Al Dhafrah
- 2017: Al Dhafrah
- 2016: Al Dhafrah
- 2015: Al Ahli
- 2014: Ittihad Kalba
- 2013: Al Khaleej
- 2012: Al Nasr
- 2011: not played
- 2010: Dibba Al Husn
- 2009: Army Club

== Super Cup Winners ==
- 2017/2018: Al Dhafrah
- 2016/2017: Al Nasr
- 2015/2016: Al Wahda
- 2014/2015: Al Khalej
- 2013/2014: Al Wasl
- 2012/2013: Al Wasl
- 2011/2012: Al Wasl

== UAE President Cup Winners ==
- 2016: Al Ahli
- 2015: Al Dhafrah
- 2014: Al Wasl
- 2013: Al Khaleej
- 2012: Al Wasl
- 2011: Al Wasl
- 2010: Al Wasl

== See also ==
- UAE Futsal League
- AFC Futsal club championship
- United Arab Emirates Football Association
- Tajik futsal
- Official page on Facebook
- United Arab Emirates national futsal team
