= Sepehr Mohammadi =

Iranian futsal player (born 1989)

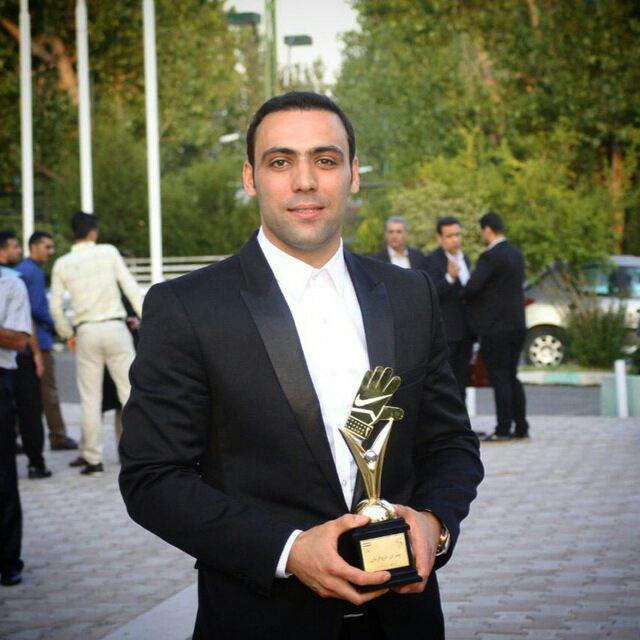

Personal information
- Full name: Sepehr Mohammadi Kamalabadi
- Date of birth: 8 August 1989 (age 37)
- Place of birth: Isfahan, Iran
- Height: 1.80 m (5 ft 11 in)
- Position: Goalkeeper

Team information
- Current team: Palayesh Naft Bandar Abbas
- Number: 1

Youth career
- Sepahan (football)
- Post

Senior career*
Years	Team	Apps	(Gls)
2007–2010	Foolad Mahan		
2010–2011	Firooz Sofeh		
2011–2012	Foolad Mahan		
2012–2015	Giti Pasand		
2015	→ Al Rayyan (loan)		
2015–2019	Giti Pasand	80	(1)
2019–2020	Gazprom-Ugra Yugorsk		
2020–	Giti Pasand		(1)

International career^{‡}
2007	Iran U23		
2011–	Iran	62	(1)
- * Club domestic league appearances and goals as of 22 January 2022 ‡ National team caps and goals as of 8 September 2019

Sepehr Mohammadi (Persian: سپهر محمدی کمال‌آبادیسپهر محمدی; born 8 August 1989) is an Iranian professional futsal player. He is a goalkeeper, and currently a member of Giti Pasand and the Iran national futsal team.

== Honours ==
=== Country ===
- FIFA Futsal World Cup
  - Third place (1): 2016
- AFC Futsal Championship
  - Champion (2): 2016 - 2018
  - Runners-up (1): 2014
- Asian Indoor and Martial Arts Games
  - Champion (2): 2013 - 2017
- WAFF Futsal Championship
  - Champion (1): 2012
- Grand Prix
  - Runner-Up (1): 2015

=== Club ===
- AFC Futsal Club Championship
  - Champion (1): 2010 (Foolad Mahan)
  - Runner-Up (2): 2013 (Giti Pasand) - 2017 (Giti Pasand)
- Iranian Futsal Super League
  - Champion (4): 2008–09 (Foolad Mahan) - 2009–10 (Foolad Mahan) - 2012–13 (Giti Pasand) - 2016–17 (Giti Pasand)
  - Runners-up (3): 2013–14 (Giti Pasand) - 2014–15 (Giti Pasand) - 2018–19 (Giti Pasand)
  - Third place (1) : 2017–18 (Giti Pasand)

=== Individual ===
- Best Goal Keeper:
  - Best Goal Keeper of the Iranian Futsal Super League (2): 2015–16 - 2016–17
  - Nominated for the best goalkeeper of the world By Umbro futsal Awards 2017 (futsalplanet.com).
