= DISI Invest Dushanbe =

- Full name: Futsal Club DISI Invest Dushanbe
- Founded: 2013; 12 years ago
- Ground: SportComplex Dynamo, Dushanbe, Tajikistan
- Chairman: Ismatullo Davlatov
- League: Tajikistan Futsal League
Home colours	Away colours

FC DISI Invest is a futsal club from Dushanbe, Tajikistan, and plays in Tajikistan Futsal League.

== Honours ==
- Tajikistan Futsal League :

2015, 2016, 2017, 2018

- Tajikistan Futsal Cup :

2013, 2015–16, 2016–17
