= Lebanese Army Futsal =

Lebanese futsal club in Beirut

- Full name: Lebanese Army Futsal
- Short name: Lebanese Army
- Founded: 2015
- Ground: Mar Roukouz
- Capacity: 1500
- Chairman: Rodolphe Haykal
- League: Lebanese Futsal League
- 2023-24: Lebanese Futsal League, 2nd of 10
| Home colours | Away colours |

Lebanese Army Futsal is a Lebanese futsal club based in Beirut. Formed in 2015, they represent the Lebanese Army in the Lebanon Futsal League. They won the league once and cup once.

== History ==
The Lebanese Army Futsal Team was established in 2015 and joined the Lebanese Futsal League in the 2018/19 season. Since then, the team has been a strong contender for the league title, securing its first championship in the 2021/22 season. The team enjoys widespread support due to its affiliation with the army. The Lebanese Army Futsal team has given the opportunity to many veterans from the Lebanese Army such as Ali Hamem, Mohammad Khalil, and Ali Akoumi, along with promising young talents, further strengthening its competitive presence.

== Current squad ==
As of 3 March 2025

| # | Position | Name | Nationality |
|---|---|---|---|
| | Goalkeeper | Boutros Zakhia | (Lebanon) |
| | Defender | Hussein El Baba | (Lebanon) |
| | Defender | Mohammed Amine Kobeissy | (Lebanon) |
| | Winger | Ahmad Zreik | (Lebanon) |
| | Winger | Ahmad Kobeissi | (Lebanon) |
| | Pivot | Mohammad Osmane | (Lebanon) |
| | Pivot | Mohamad Abo Zeid | (Lebanon) |
| | Winger | Mohammad Al Haj | (Lebanon) |
| | Defender | Ali Akoumi | (Lebanon) |
| | Winger | Mohammad Khalil | (Lebanon) |
| | Winger | Abbas Houssaini | (Lebanon) |

== Honours ==
- Lebanese Futsal League
  - Winners (1): 2021-22
- Lebanese Futsal Cup
  - Winners (1): 2023-24
