= Club Central Jounieh =

Lebanese sports club

- Nickname: نادي المركزية جونية
- Leagues: Lebanese Basketball League
- Founded: 1985
- Arena: Club Central Gymnasium School Sport Complex
- Capacity: 450
- Location: Jounieh, Lebanon
- Team colors: Blue, White
- Affiliation: Collège Central de Jounieh
- Championships: 1 Lebanese Cup (2025)
Home	Away

Club Central Jounieh (Arabic: نادي المركزية جونية), also known in Arabic as Al Markaziyya Jounieh is a Lebanese sports club located in Jounieh, Lebanon, 20 kilometers north of Beirut, the country's capital. The club is best known for its basketball team, which was founded in 1985, and plays in the Lebanese Basketball League, the top division of Lebanon. The team is also affiliated with the Collège Central de Jounieh, but runs separately.

== Basketball team ==
Club Central Jounieh roster
Players
Coaches

Pos.	No.	Nat.	Name	Ht.	Age
F/C	0	(United States)	Williams, Jarvis	2.03 m (6 ft 8 in)	33 – 21 January 1993
G	1	(United States) (Lebanon)	Jamaleddine, Omar	1.93 m (6 ft 4 in)	26 – 13 June 2000
PG	2	(United States) (Syria)	McGill, Donte	1.90 m (6 ft 3 in)	31 – 16 May 1995
SG	4	(United States)	Khoury, Matthew	1.90 m (6 ft 3 in)
F/C	5	(Lebanon)	Saad, Elios	2.02 m (6 ft 8 in)	25 – 1 September 2001
PG	8	(Lebanon)	Khalil, Jad	1.86 m (6 ft 1 in)	29 – 20 November 1996
F	11	(Lebanon)	El Hachem, Chris	1.97 m (6 ft 6 in)	21 – 27 August 2005
G	13	(Lebanon)	Ghosn, Elio	1.88 m (6 ft 2 in)	26 – 11 August 2000
F	15	(Lebanon)	El Khatib, Jihad	2.06 m (6 ft 9 in)	21 – 24 August 2005
SG	22	(Lebanon)	Ghaleb, Elie	1.85 m (6 ft 1 in)	32 – 3 October 1994
PG	23	(Lebanon) (United States)	Salem, Ghassan	1.86 m (6 ft 1 in)	20 – 20 May 2006
PG	51	(Lebanon)	Kayal, Mark	1.87 m (6 ft 2 in)	18 – 15 July 2008

Head coach

- (Lebanon) Georges Geagea

Assistant coach(es)

- (Lebanon) Sabah Khoury

Legend

- (C) Team captain
- Injured

== Futsal team ==
The club has a futsal program competing in the Lebanese Futsal League. Although affiliated to Collège Central Jounieh, their futsal professional program is also ran independently. The team trains in the school sports complex and plays in various arenas.
