= Mohammad Shajari =

Iranian professional futsal player (born 1991)

Personal information
- Full name: Mohammad Shajari
- Date of birth: 30 August 1991 (age 35)
- Place of birth: Saveh, Iran
- Height: 1.73 m (5 ft 8 in)
- Position: Defender

Team information
- Current team: Giti Pasand
- Number: 8

Youth career
- Shahrdari Saveh

Senior career*
Years	Team	Apps	(Gls)
–2015	Shahrdari Saveh		
2015–2016	Melli Haffari		(6)
2016–2018	Tasisat Daryaei		(17)
2018–2019	Giti Pasand		(17)
2019–2021	Mes Sungun		(13)
2021–2022	Crop		(11)
2022–	Giti Pasand		(0)

International career^{‡}
2014–	Iran		(19)
- * Club domestic league appearances and goals as of 16 November 2022 ‡ National team caps and goals as of 10 February 2019

Mohammad Shajari (Persian: محمد شجری; born 30 August 1991) is an Iranian professional futsal player. He is currently a member of Giti Pasand in the Iranian Futsal Super League.

== Honours ==
=== Country ===
- AFC Futsal Championship
  - Champion (1): 2018
  - Runners-up (1): 2014
- Asian Indoor Games
  - Champion (1): 2017

=== Club ===
- AFC Futsal Club Championship
  - Runners-up (1): 2019 (Mes Sungun)
- Iranian Futsal Super League
  - Runners-up (1): 2017–18 (Tasisat Daryaei) - 2018–19 (Giti Pasand)

== International goals ==
#	Date	Venue	Opponent	Score	Result	Competition
1	19 April 2014	(Uzbekistan) Sports Center, Tashkent	Uzbekistan	1 - 0	6 - 1	Friendly
2	7 May 2014	(Vietnam) Phu Tho Gymnasium, Ho Chi Minh City	Vietnam	3 - 0	15 - 4	2014 AFC Futsal Championship
3	7 May 2014	(Vietnam) Phu Tho Gymnasium, Ho Chi Minh City	Vietnam	10 - 3	15 - 4	2014 AFC Futsal Championship
4	7 May 2014	(Vietnam) Phu Tho Gymnasium, Ho Chi Minh City	Vietnam	12 - 3	15 - 4	2014 AFC Futsal Championship
5	8 May 2014	(Vietnam) Phu Tho Gymnasium, Ho Chi Minh City	Uzbekistan	10 - 0	10 - 0	2014 AFC Futsal Championship
6	12 November 2014	(Brazil) Ginásio Poliesportivo Adib Moysés Dib, São Bernardo do Campo	Guatemala	5 - 0	7 - 2	2014 Grand Prix de Futsal
7	18 December 2015	(China) Changshu Sports Center, Changshu	Myanmar	?? - ??	15 - 2	Changshu International Tournament
8	12 March 2017	(Iran) Azad university Arena, Shiraz	Iraq	2 - 0	9 - 3	Friendly
9	12 March 2017	(Iran) Azad university Arena, Shiraz	Iraq	?? - ??	9 - 3	Friendly
10	3 April 2017	(Croatia) Sportskoj dvorani Osnovna škola Župa Dubrovačka, Župa dubrovačka	Croatia	1 - 3	2 - 4	Friendly
11	18 September 2017	(Turkmenistan) Ice Palace Hall 2, Ashgabat	Tahiti	11 - 1	16 - 1	2017 Asian Indoor Games
12	18 September 2017	(Turkmenistan) Ice Palace Hall 2, Ashgabat	Tahiti	12 - 1	16 - 1	2017 Asian Indoor Games
13	3 December 2017	(Iran) 25 Aban Arena, Isfahan	Azerbaijan	3 - 2	3 - 3	Isfahan 2017
14	6 December 2017	(Iran) 25 Aban Arena, Isfahan	Russia	4 - 0	4 - 0	Isfahan 2017
15	4 February 2018	(Taiwan) University of Taipei Gymnasium, Taipei	China	5 - 0	11 - 1	2018 AFC Futsal Championship
16	8 February 2018	(Taiwan) Xinzhuang Gymnasium, New Taipei City	Thailand	7 - 1	9 - 1	2018 AFC Futsal Championship
17	8 February 2018	(Taiwan) Xinzhuang Gymnasium, New Taipei City	Thailand	8 - 1	9 - 1	2018 AFC Futsal Championship
18	24 September 2018	(Iran) Shahid Poursharifi, Tabriz	Japan	3 - 2	3 - 3	Tabriz 2018
19	4 February 2019	(Serbia) Sportski centar Lagator, Loznica	Serbia	3 - 1	6 - 3	Friendly
