= Club Aamal Sportif Bikfaya =

Lebanese futsal club in Beirut

- Full name: Club Aamal Sportif Bikfaya
- Short name: Aamal Bikfaya
- Founded: 1948
- Ground: Emile Lahoud Stadium
- Capacity: 2000
- Chairman: Antoine Estephan
- Head Coach: Youssef Chebly
- League: Lebanese Futsal League
- 2023-24: Lebanese Futsal League, 9th of 10
Home colours	Away colours

Club Aamal Sportif Bikfaya is a Lebanese multi-sports club founded in 1948 in Bikfaya. The club competes professionally in various sports, including futsal, football, volleyball, and basketball. It currently plays in the first division of both the Lebanese Futsal League and the Lebanese volleyball league.

== Men's Futsal Team ==
The men's futsal team won the 2021-22 Lebanese Second Division Futsal League, earning promotion to the 2022–23 Lebanese Futsal League. In their first season in the top division, they secured 9th place, ensuring their stay in the league

== Men's Basketball Team ==
Aamal Bikfaya is one of the oldest basketball clubs in Lebanon. The team won the national championship in 1992, a season led by coach Ghassan Sarkis that marked the breakthrough of Lebanese basketball legend Elie Mechantaf. However, the club's performance declined in the following years, leading to relegation to the lower divisions. They currently compete in the Lebanese Third Division.

== Honours ==
=== Futsal ===
- Lebanese Futsal Second Division
  - Winners (1): 2021–22

=== Basketball ===
- Lebanese Basketball League
  - Winners (1): 1991-92
