= Al Dhafra FC (futsal) =

Futsal cluub from Madinat Zayed, UAE

Al Dhafra Futsal Club
- Full name: Al Dhafra Futsal Club
- Nickname(s): The Western Knights
- Ground: Baynunah Educational complex Medinat Zayed
- Owner: Hamdan bin Zayed bin Sultan Al Nahyan
- Manager: Dejan Dedovic
- 2019/2020: UAE Futsal League, 6th
- Website: http://www.dfsc.ae/
| Home colours | Away colours |

Al Dhafra Futsal Club is an Emirati futsal club from Madinat Zayed and part of AL DHAFRA SC family. Club participated in AFC Futsal Club Championship.

== History ==
Al Dhafra FC was established as part of a policy to promote sports across the country and the Al Dhafra region of Abu Dhabi had no team, so Al Dhafra is the first and only club to be located in the western region.

== Managers ==
- (Spain) Luis Fonseca
- (Portugal) Rui Guimaraes
- (Serbia) Dejan Dedovic (2020–present)

== Honours ==
- UAE President's Cup:

- Winner (1): 2014/2015

- UAE futsal league:

- Champions: 2016-17, 2017–18, 2020-21

- UAE futsal Cup: 2

- Champions: 2016/17, 2017/18

- UAE Federation Cup:

- Vice Champion: 2021

- UAE Super Cup:

- Winner: 2021
