= Nejmeh SC (futsal) =

Lebanese futsal club in Beirut

Nejmeh
- Full name: Nejmeh Sporting Club Futsal Team
- Short name: Nejmeh
- Founded: 2022; 3 years ago, as Tawfeer Futsal Club
- Ground: Sadaka Stadium
- Capacity: 2,000
- Chairman: Saeed Serbeh
- Head coach: Mohammad Lahham
- League: Lebanese Futsal League
- 2023–24: Lebanese Futsal League, 1st of 10 (champions)
Home colours

Nejmeh Sporting Club Futsal Team (Arabic: فريق نادي النجمة لكرة الصالات), or simply Nejmeh, is a futsal club based in Beirut, Lebanon. It is a part of Nejmeh Sporting Club.

Formed in 2022 as Tawfeer Futsal Team, they won the Lebanese Futsal League twice and the Lebanese Futsal Cup once.

== History ==
=== Tawfeer ===
Tawfeer Futsal Club was established in 2022 by businessman Rami Bitar, the owner of Tawfeer Markets and vice president of Safa SC. The club quickly made an impact in the Lebanese Futsal League, securing back-to-back league titles in the 2022–23 and 2023–24 seasons. Tawfeer Futsal has attracted notable players from the Lebanon national futsal team such as Hussein Hamadani, Kassem Kawsan, and Hasan Zaitun, along with promising young talents, further strengthening its competitive presence.

=== Nejmeh ===
On 2 September 2025, Nejmeh SC announced that the name of Tawfeer Futsal Club had changed to Nejmeh Sporting Club Futsal Team.

== Current squad ==
As of 3 March 2025

#	Position	Name	Nationality
1	Goalkeeper	Hussein Hamadani	(Lebanon)
3	Defender	Mahdi Malak	(Lebanon)
5	Defender	Ali Jammoul	(Lebanon)
7	Winger	Hassan Zaitun	(Lebanon)
8	Winger	Kassem Kawsan	(Lebanon)
9	Pivot	Mustafa Rhayem	(Lebanon)
11	Pivot	John Jabbour	(Lebanon)
12	Winger	George El Khoury	(Lebanon)
20	Defender	Ali Daher	(Lebanon)
29	Winger	Hassan Alame	(Lebanon)
30	Winger	Mohsen Mohsen	(Lebanon)

== Honours ==
- Lebanese Futsal League
  - Winners (2): 2022–23, 2023–24
- Lebanese Futsal Cup
  - Winners (1): 2022–23
