= Lebanese Futsal League =

- Organising body: Lebanese Football Association (LFA)
- Founded: 2007; 19 years ago
- Country: Lebanon
- Confederation: AFC
- Number of clubs: 10
- Level on pyramid: 1
- Relegation to: Lebanese Futsal League Second Division
- Domestic cup: Lebanese Futsal Cup
- International cup: AFC Futsal Club Championship
- Current champions: Nejmeh (1st title) (2025–26)
- Most championships: Beirut Stars (5 titles)
- Broadcaster(s): OTV (TV broadcasting); Mycujoo (Online streaming)
- Current: 2025–26 Lebanese Futsal League

The Lebanese Futsal League (Arabic: دوري كرة القدم الخماسية اللبناني) is the top league of futsal in Lebanon. There are 10 teams competing in the league, which operates on a system of promotion and relegation with the Lebanese Futsal League Second Division.

The league was formed in 2007, with Pro's Cafe Beirut winning the first title. The most successful club in the league is Bank of Beirut, with five league titles.

== Clubs ==
=== Champions ===
Wins by year

No.	Season	Champion
1	2007–08	Pro's Cafe Beirut
2	2008–09	Pro's Cafe Beirut
3	2009–10	Pro's Cafe Beirut
4	2010–11	Sadaka
5	2011–12	All Sports Club
6	2012–13	Sadaka
7	2013–14	Bank of Beirut
8	2014–15	Bank of Beirut
9	2015–16	Mayadeen
10	2016–17	Bank of Beirut

No.	Season	Champion
11	2017–18	Bank of Beirut
12	2018–19	Bank of Beirut
	2019–20	Canceled
13	2020–21	Hurriya Saida
14	2021–22	Lebanese Army
15	2022–23	Tawfeer
16	2023–24	Tawfeer
17	2024–25	Central Jounieh
18	2025–26	Nejmeh

==== Wins by club ====
Club	Wins	Winning years
Beirut Stars	5	2013–14, 2014–15, 2016–17, 2017–18, 2018–19
Pro's Cafe Beirut	3	2007–08, 2008–09, 2009–10
Sadaka	2	2010–11, 2012–13
Tawfeer	2	2022–23, 2023–24
All Sports Club	1	2011–12
Mayadeen	1	2015–16
Hurriya Saida	1	2020–21
Lebanese Army	1	2021–22
Central Jounieh	1	2024–25
Nejmeh	1	2025–26

=== 2024–25 season ===
The following 10 clubs played in the Lebanese Futsal League during the 2024–25 season.

Club	Home city	Top division titles	Last top division title
Aamal Bikfaya	Bikfaya	0	n/a
Beirut Stars	Beirut	5	2018–19
Central Jounieh	Jounieh	0	n/a
Chabibet Hamat	Hamat	0	n/a
Lebanese Army	Mar Roukouz	1	2021–22
Louaize	Zouk Mosbeh	0	n/a
NSK	Chadra	0	n/a
Sporting 1875	Beirut	0	n/a
Tawfeer	Beirut	2	2023–24
TFA	Sidon	0	n/a

== See also ==
- Lebanon national futsal team
- Lebanon women's national futsal team
- Lebanese Premier League
