= Victoria University College (Myanmar) =

Private university college in Myanmar

Coordinates: 16°48′09.1″N 96°10′22.1″E

Victoria University College (Myanmar) is a private university college in Myanmar. Being the first private university in the country, Victoria University College comprises four campuses - three in Yangon, and one in Mandalay.

== History ==
Nay Win Naing founded the Victoria University College (Myanmar) in 2012 (14 years ago). It started as a college which offered Edexce Business and Technology Education Council Higher National Diplomas and sixth forms subjects. In 2014, VUC became an international teaching center of University of Wolverhampton and offer joint Bachelor's degree.

== Courses delivery ==
Since 2012, Victoria University College has been delivering the below BTEC HND Courses;

1. Business (Management/ Marketing/ HR),
2. Computing (Software/ Network/ IT) and
3. Engineering (Civil Engineering, Mechanical Engineering, Electrical & Electronics Engineering).

The University of Wolverhampton has been in partnership with Victoria University College since May 2014, delivering the following courses;

1. BEng (Hons) Electronics and Communications Engineering
2. BEng (Hons) Civil Engineering
3. BA (Hons) Business Management
4. BEng (Hons) Mechatronics
5. BSc (Hons) Computing and Information Technology
6. MSc Programme and Project Management

== Sports team - VUC athletics ==
Victoria University College has been sponsoring a professional Futsal football team under University's name since 2015. Victoria University College Futsal Club is now competing in National's Myanmar Futsal League.
