= Angellot Caro =

Colombian futsal player

Personal information
- Full name: Angellot Alexander Caro Garcés
- Date of birth: 3 December 1988 (age 37)
- Place of birth: Bogotá, Colombia
- Height: 1.69 m (5 ft 7 in)
- Position: Forward

Team information
- Current team: Atlético Parceros FC (Kings League)

Senior career*
Years	Team	Apps	(Gls)
2010–2011	Benago		
2011	Caja Segovia		
2012	Trujillanos		
2013	Al Wasl		
2014	Real Bucaramanga		
2015–2016	Al Mayadeen		
2016	Feniks		
2018	Sparta Praha		
2019	Naft Al Wasat		
2019	Anorthosis		
2022–present	Barranquilleros FS		
2023	Atlético Parceros FC (Kings League)		
2025	Colombia (Kings Nations World Cup)		

International career
2006–2024	Colombia		
- * Club domestic league appearances and goals

Angellot Alexander Caro Garcés (born 3 December 1988) is a Colombian futsal player who plays for Barranquilleros FS. Known for his technical ability, leadership, and international experience, Caro has been a key figure in Colombian futsal for nearly two decades.

== Early life ==
Caro was born in Tunjuelito, a neighborhood in Bogotá, Colombia. Growing up in a humble environment, he developed his skills playing futsal in local tournaments. His early career began with Saeta Bogotá before moving to Czech side Benago in 2008.

== Club career ==
Caro's extensive career has seen him play in over 10 countries, including stints in Spain, Italy, the Czech Republic, Lebanon, and Brazil. Highlights of his club career include:

- Benago (2008–2011, 2012): Caro began his professional career in the Czech Republic with Benago.
- Caja Segovia (2011): Played in the Spanish league under renowned coach Jesús Velasco.
- Al Mayadeen (2015–2016): Won the Lebanese futsal league title.
- Magnus Futsal (2023): Became the first Colombian to win the Copa Brasil.

In 2022, Caro joined Barranquilleros FS in Colombia as both a player and a coach. He also played for Atlético Parceros FC in the Americas Kings League and represented Colombia as player in the Kings Nations World Cup in 2025.

== International career ==
Caro represented Colombia in two FIFA Futsal World Cups, including the team's historic fourth-place finish in the 2012 FIFA Futsal World Cup in Thailand. Known for his creativity and leadership, he served as captain from 2014 until his retirement in 2024.

In February 2024, Caro announced his retirement from the national team after Colombia's elimination in the Copa América, where he publicly took responsibility for a crucial mistake in the tournament.

== Honours ==
=== Club ===
- Copa Brasil: 2023 (Magnus Futsal)
- Lebanese Futsal League: 2015–16 (Al Mayadeen)
- Czech Futsal League: 2018 (Sparta Praha)

=== International ===
- FIFA Futsal World Cup: Fourth place (2012)

== Personal life ==
Angellot Caro is close friends with Colombian football star James Rodríguez, with whom he has shared several social and professional moments.
