= Fábio Lima (futsal player) =

Portuguese futsal player

Personal information
- Full name: Fábio Daniel Marques Lima
- Date of birth: 16 October 1988 (age 38)
- Place of birth: Porto, Portugal
- Height: 1.71 m (5 ft 7 in)
- Position: Winger

Team information
- Current team: SCUT-Torreense
- Number: 9

Youth career
- 2000–2004: Portuguesa Aldoar
- 2004–2007: Boavista

Senior career*
Years	Team	Apps	(Gls)
2007–2012	Boavista		
2012	Zhuhai Ming Shi		
2012–2014	Rio Ave		
2014–2016	Sporting CP	90	(29)
2016–2019	Modicus Sandim	78	(75)
2019	Al Dhafra		
2019–	Modicus Sandim		

International career^{‡}
2013–	Portugal	25	(7)
- * Club domestic league appearances and goals as of 00:00, 20 June 2016 (UTC) ‡ National team caps and goals as of 15:00, 21 June 2016 (UTC)

Fábio Daniel Marques Lima (born 16 October 1988) is a Portuguese futsal player who plays for Modicus Sandim and the Portugal national team.
