= Kazuya Shimizu =

Japanese futsal player

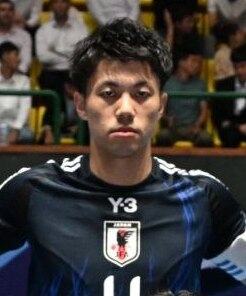

Personal information
- Full name: Kazuya Shimizu
- Date of birth: 6 February 1997 (age 29)
- Place of birth: Tokyo, Japan
- Height: 1.78 m (5 ft 10 in)
- Position: Pivot

Team information
- Current team: Nagoya Oceans
- Number: 11

Senior career*
Years	Team	Apps	(Gls)
2013–2023	Fugador Sumida		
2018–2019	→ ElPozo Murcia FS B (loan)		
2019	→ Thái Sơn Nam (loan)		
2019–2020	→ ElPozo Murcia FS B (loan)		
2020–2021	→ Córdoba CF Futsal (loan)		

International career
2016–2017	Japan U20		
2015–	Japan		
- * Club domestic league appearances and goals

Kazuya Shimizu (清水 和也, Shimizu Kazuya; born 6 February 1997) is a Japanese futsal player who plays for Nagoya Oceans and the Japan national team.

== Career ==
On 6 February 1997, he was born in Tokyo, Japan. He joined Fugador Sumida's youth team in 2014, aged seventeen. He made his senior debut with the top team on September 27, 2014, in F.League. In 2015–16, he won the F.League New Player Award. In July 2018, he moved to ElPozo Murcia FS B in the Spanish Second Division on loan.

In August 2019, he joined Thái Sơn Nam in the Vietnam Futsal League on loan. He won the top scorer of the 2019 AFC Futsal Club Championship. In January 2020, he moved to Córdoba CF Futsal in the Spanish First Division on loan.

== Title ==
Individual

- F.League New Player Award (1) : 2015–16
- AFC Futsal Club Championship Top Scorer (1) : 2019

Team

- AFC Futsal Asian Cup (1) : 2022 AFC Futsal Asian Cup
- AFC Futsal Club Championship : Third place 2019

Sporting positions
Preceded by (Thailand) Jirawat Sornwichian	AFC Futsal Club Championship Top Scorers; 2019 (10 Goals)	Succeeded by Incumbent
