= Beirut Stars SC =

Lebanese futsal club

Beirut Stars
- Full name: Beirut Stars Sporting Club
- Founded: 2013; 12 years ago, as Bank of Beirut Sporting Club; 8 October 2020; 4 years ago, as Beirut Stars Sporting Club
- President: Jad Deaibes
- Head coach: Hassan Hammoud

Beirut Stars Sporting Club (Arabic: نادي نجوم بيروت الرياضي), formerly Bank of Beirut Sporting Club (Arabic: نادي بنك بيروت الرياضي) is a futsal club based in Beirut, Lebanon. Founded in 2020, it is the successor to the futsal club founded in 2013 as Bank of Beirut. The club has won five Lebanese Futsal League titles, four Lebanese Futsal Cups, and three Lebanese Futsal Super Cup, and have came in third place in the 2018 edition of the AFC Futsal Club Championship.

== History ==
Founded in 2013, Bank of Beirut SC was sponsored by Bank of Beirut and have won the Lebanese Futsal League five times. They became the first Lebanese futsal team to achieve a treble, winning the League, Cup, and super cup in the 2014–15 season. On 9 July 2020, due to the economic crisis in Lebanon, Bank of Beirut stopped their futsal activities.

On 8 October 2020, Beirut Stars SC bought the license of the dissolved club. Beirut Stars' president, Jad Deaibes, was the General Secretary of Bank of Beirut, and Hassan Hammoud, the club's coach, was the coach of Bank of Beirut.

== Chronicle ==
Chronicle of Beirut Stars SC

- 2013: Founded as Bank of Beirut SC
- 2013–14 Lebanese Futsal League: Champions
- 2014–15 Lebanese Futsal League: Champions
- 2015–16 Lebanese Futsal League: 2nd
- 2016–17 Lebanese Futsal League: Champions
- 2017–18 Lebanese Futsal League: Champions
- 2018–19 Lebanese Futsal League: Champions
- 2020: Re-founded as Beirut Stars SC

== Honours ==
- Lebanese Futsal League
  - Winners (5): 2013–14, 2014–15, 2016–17, 2017–18, 2018–19
- Lebanese Futsal Cup
  - Winners (4): 2014–15, 2015–16, 2017–18, 2018–19
- Lebanese Futsal Super Cup
  - Winners (3): 2014, 2017, 2018

== Asian record ==
- AFC Futsal Club Championship: 5 appearances

2014: Group stage
2015: Quarter-finals
2017: Quarter-finals
2018: Third place
2019: Quarter-finals
