= Shota Hoshi =

Japanese futsal player

Personal information
- Full name: Shota Hoshi
- Date of birth: 17 November 1985 (age 40)
- Place of birth: Tokyo, Japan
- Height: 1.73 m (5 ft 8 in)
- Position: Pivot

Team information
- Current team: Nagoya Oceans

International career
| Years | Team | Apps | (Gls) |
| 2009- | Japan | | |

Shota Hoshi (星 翔太, Hoshi Shōta; born 17 November 1985), is a Japanese futsal player who plays for Nagoya Oceans and the Japanese national futsal team.

== Clubs ==
- 2004-2009 (Japan) Fugador Sumida
- 2009-2010 (Japan) Bardral Urayasu
- 2010-2011 (Spain) UD Guadalajara FS
- 2011-2012 (Spain) FS García
- 2012 (Qatar) Al-Rayyan SC
- 2012-2018 (Japan) Bardral Urayasu
- 2018- (Japan) Nagoya Oceans

== Titles ==
=== Club ===
- F.League (1)
  - 2018-19
- All Japan Futsal Championship (2)
  - 2018, 2019
- F.League Ocean Cup (2)
  - 2018, 2019

=== Individual ===
- F.League Best 5 (1)
  - 2014-15
