= UAE Futsal League =

UAE futsal league
- Country: UAE
- Confederation: AFC
- Divisions: 2
- Number of clubs: 8
- Level on pyramid: 1
- Relegation to: UAE Futsal's 2nd Division
- International cup(s): AFC Futsal Club Championship
- Current champions: Al_Dhafra_FC_(futsal) (2020-21)
- Current: 2020-21 UAE Futsal League

The UAE Futsal League, is the top league for futsal in the United Arab Emirates. The winning team obtains the participation right to the AFC Futsal Club Championship.

== Champions ==
- 2020/2021: Al Dhafra FC (futsal)
- 2019/2020: Batayeh
- 2018/2019: Al Ahli
- 2017/2018: Al Dhafrah
- 2016/2017: Al Dhafrah
- 2015/2016: Al Ahli
- 2014/2015: Al Wahda
- 2013/2014: Al Khaleej
- 2012/2013: Al Wasl
- 2011/2012: Al Wasl
- 2010/2011: Al Wasl
- 2009/2010: Al Wasl

== See also ==
- AFC Futsal club championship
- United Arab Emirates Football Association
- Tajik futsal
- Official page on Facebook
- United Arab Emirates national futsal team
