= Mar Roukouz =

Mar Roukouz مار روكز
- City
- Location within Lebanon
- Coordinates: 33°52′N 35°33′E
- Country: Lebanon
- Governorate: Mount Lebanon Governorate
- District: Matn District

Government
  - Time Zone: GMT +2 (UTC)
  - - Summer (DST): +3 (UTC)
  - Area Code(s): (+961) 1
- Time zone: UTC+2 (EET)
  - Summer (DST): UTC+3 (EEST)
- Dialing code: +961

Mar Roukouz or Mar Roukoz (Arabic: مار روكز, romanized: Mār Rūkuz) is a village in the Matn District of the Mount Lebanon Governorate, Lebanon.

== Overview ==
Mar Roukoz is mostly a residential region. Notable places include the School of Engineering and the Faculty of Science of Saint Joseph University, as well as several country clubs, and a water park. The village is under the administration of the Municipality of Dekwaneh, and is officially a part of the region of Dahr el Hossein.

== Etymology ==
The region is named after Saint Roch (Mar Roukoz in Arabic) Monastery which is built on a prominent hill, and serves as the headquarters of the Maronite Antonine Order. The monastery was established in 1768.

== Demographics ==
The population is predominantly maronite catholic
