= Tajikistan Futsal League =

Tajikistan futsal league
- Country: Tajikistan
- Confederation: AFC
- Divisions: 2
- Number of clubs: 8
- Level on pyramid: 1
- Relegation to: Tajikistan Futsal's 2nd Division
- International cup: AFC Futsal Club Championship
- Current champions: Soro Company (2018-19)
- Most championships: Disi Invest Dushanbe (4)
- Current: 2019–20 Tajikistan futsal league

The Tajikistan Futsal League, is the top league for Futsal in Tajikistan. The winning team obtains the participation right to the AFC Futsal Club Championship.

== Teams ==
Teams playing the Tajikistan futsal league 2019–20 season.

Soro company
Sipar Khujand
Istaravsan
Ravsan
Karon
Samandar
Artis
Pamir

== Champions ==
- 2015: DISI Invest
- 2016: DISI Invest
- 2017: DISI Invest
- 2018: DISI Invest
- 2019: Soro Company
- 2020:DISI Invest

== See also ==
- AFC Futsal club championship
- Tajikistan Football Federation
- Tajikistan national futsal team
