= 2016 AFC Futsal Club Championship =

ฟุตซอลสโมสรชิงชนะเลิศแห่งเอเชีย 2016

Tournament details
- Host country: Thailand
- City: Bangkok
- Dates: 15–23 July 2016
- Teams: 12 (from 12 associations)
- Venue: 1 (in 1 host city)

Final positions
- Champions: (Japan) Nagoya Oceans (3rd title)
- Runners-up: (Iraq) Naft Al-Wasat
- Third place: (Thailand) Chonburi Bluewave
- Fourth place: (United Arab Emirates) Dibba Al-Hisn

Tournament statistics
- Matches played: 20
- Goals scored: 104 (5.2 per match)
- Attendance: 64,600 (3,230 per match)
- Top scorer: (Thailand) Jirawat Sornwichian (7 goals)
- Best player: (Iran) Farhad Tavakoli
- Fair play award: (United Arab Emirates) Dibba Al-Hisn

The 2016 AFC Futsal Club Championship was the 7th edition of the AFC Futsal Club Championship, the annual Asian futsal club championship organized by the Asian Football Confederation (AFC). The tournament was held in Bangkok, Thailand between July 17 and July 23, 2016.

== Qualified teams ==
Locations of clubs in the 2016 AFC Futsal Club Championship group stage.
Blue: Group A; Green: Group B; Black: Group C; Red: Group D; Purple: Quarter-finals-finals;
Pink: 4th Place; Brown: 3rd Place; Yellow: Runner-up; Orange: Winner.

A total of 12 teams from 12 AFC member associations participated in the tournament.

Association	Team	Qualified as
Iran	Tasisat Daryaei	2015 AFC Futsal Club Championship champions / 2015–16 Iranian Futsal Super League champions
Japan	Nagoya Oceans	2014–15 F. League champions
Thailand	Chonburi Bluewave	Host representative /2015–16 Thailand Futsal League champions
China	Dalian Yuan Dynasty	2014–15 Chinese Futsal League champions
Uzbekistan	AGMK	2015 Uzbekistan Futsal League champions
Australia	Vic Vipers	2015–16 F-League champions
(Chinese Taipei) Chinese Taipei	Taipower	2015–16 Chinese Taipei Futsal League champions
Qatar	Al-Sadd	2015–16 Qatar Futsal League champions
Vietnam	Sanna Khánh Hòa	2015 Vietnam National Futsal League champions
(United Arab Emirates) United Arab Emirates	Dibba Al-Hisn	2014–15 UAE Futsal League champions
Iraq	Naft Al-Wasat	2015–16 Iraq Futsal League champions
Lebanon	Al-Mayadeen	2015–16 Lebanon Futsal League champions

== Venue ==
The matches are played at the Bangkok Arena in Bangkok.

Bangkok Metropolis	Nong Chok
Bangkok Metropolis	Bangkok Arena
Bangkok Metropolis	Capacity: 12,000
2016 AFC Futsal Club Championship (Bangkok)	

== Draw ==
The draw was held on 6 May 2016 in Bangkok. The 12 teams were drawn into four groups of three teams. Besides the team from the host association Thailand, the teams from Iran, Vietnam and Iraq were also seeded as per the final ranking of the 2015 AFC Futsal Club Championship.

Pot 1	Pot 2	Pot 3
(Thailand) Chonburi Bluewave (hosts; position A1); (Iran) Tasisat Daryaei; (Vietnam) Sanna Khánh Hòa; (Iraq) Naft Al-Wasat	(Japan) Nagoya Oceans; (China) Dalian Yuan Dynasty; (Lebanon) Al-Mayadeen; (Qatar) Al-Sadd	(Uzbekistan) AGMK; (Australia) Vic Vipers; (United Arab Emirates) Dibba Al-Hisn; (Chinese Taipei) Taipower

== Squads ==
Each team had to submit a squad of 14 players, including a minimum of two goalkeepers.

== Match officials ==
The following referees were chosen for the 2016 AFC Futsal Club Championship.

Referees

- (Australia) Ryan Shepheard
- (Australia) Scott Kidson
- (China) An Ran
- (Hong Kong) Chan Ka Chung
- (Iran) Mahmoud Reza Nasirlou
- (Iraq) Hasan Mohammed Mousa Al-Gburi
- (Japan) Kobayashi Hiroyuki
- (Japan) Kozaki Tomohiro
- (Jordan) Husein Mahmoud Husein Khalaileh
- (Kyrgyzstan) Nurdin Bukuev
- (Lebanon) Mohamad Chami
- (Malaysia) Helday Idang
- (Philippines) Rey Ritaga
- (Thailand) Yuttakon Maiket

== Group stage ==
The top two teams of each group advanced to the quarter-finals.

Tiebreakers

The teams were ranked according to points (3 points for a win, 1 point for a draw, 0 points for a loss). If tied on points, tiebreakers would be applied in the following order:

1. Greater number of points obtained in the group matches between the teams concerned;
2. Goal difference resulting from the group matches between the teams concerned;
3. Greater number of goals scored in the group matches between the teams concerned;
4. If, after applying criteria 1 to 3, teams still have an equal ranking, criteria 1 to 3 are reapplied exclusively to the matches between the teams in question to determine their final rankings. If this procedure does not lead to a decision, criteria 5 to 9 apply;
5. Goal difference in all the group matches;
6. Greater number of goals scored in all the group matches;
7. Penalty shoot-out if only two teams are involved and they are both on the field of play;
8. Fewer score calculated according to the number of yellow and red cards received in the group matches (1 point for a single yellow card, 3 points for a red card as a consequence of two yellow cards, 3 points for a direct red card, 4 points for a yellow card followed by a direct red card);
9. Drawing of lots.

All times are local, ICT (UTC+7).

=== Group A ===
Pos	Team	Pld	W	D	L	GF	GA	GD	Pts	Qualification
1	(Thailand) Chonburi Bluewave (H)	2	2	0	0	9	4	+5	6	Knockout stage
2	(Japan) Nagoya Oceans	2	0	1	1	3	5	−2	1	Knockout stage
3	(Australia) Vic Vipers	2	0	1	1	5	8	−3	1	

Source: AFC
Rules for classification: Group stage tiebreakers
(H) Hosts
15 July 2016
20:00

Chonburi Bluewave (Thailand)	6–3	(Australia) Vic Vipers
Jirawat 16', 17'; Suphawut 23'; Sarawut 32'; Barrientos 35' (o.g.); Sorasak 38'	Report	Alinejad 9'; Barrientos 24'; Jirawat 27' (o.g.)

Bangkok Arena, Bangkok
Attendance: 5,600
Referee: Mohamad Chami (Lebanon)

16 July 2016
19:30

Nagoya Oceans (Japan)	2–2	(Australia) Vic Vipers
Yoshikawa 16'; Sakai 33'	Report	Alinejad 30'; Cooper 32'

Bangkok Arena, Bangkok
Attendance: 200
Referee: An Ran (China)

17 July 2016
19:30

Chonburi Bluewave (Thailand)	3–1	(Japan) Nagoya Oceans
Jirawat 2'; Suphawut 27'; Jetsada 35'	Report	Ando 26'

Bangkok Arena, Bangkok
Attendance: 10,200
Referee: Mahmoud Reza Nasirloo (Iran)

=== Group B ===
Pos	Team	Pld	W	D	L	GF	GA	GD	Pts	Qualification
1	(Iran) Tasisat Daryaei	2	2	0	0	10	5	+5	6	Knockout stage
2	(Uzbekistan) AGMK	2	0	1	1	5	6	−1	1	Knockout stage
3	(Lebanon) Al-Mayadeen	2	0	1	1	4	8	−4	1	

Source: AFC
Rules for classification: Group stage tiebreakers
15 July 2016
17:00

Tasisat Daryaei (Iran)	4–3	(Uzbekistan) AGMK
Tayyebi 4', 38'; Ahmadabbasi 17', 32'	Report	Farkhod 12', 13'; Javlon 39'

Bangkok Arena, Bangkok
Attendance: 300
Referee: Yuttakon Maiket (Thailand)

16 July 2016
17:00

Al-Mayadeen (Lebanon)	2–2	(Uzbekistan) AGMK
Takaji 4', 20'	Report	Sharipov 3'; Sviridov 31'

Bangkok Arena, Bangkok
Attendance: 200
Referee: Hasan Mohammed Mousa Al-Gburi (Iraq)

17 July 2016
17:00

Tasisat Daryaei (Iran)	6–2	(Lebanon) Al-Mayadeen
Tayyebi 20', 21', 24'; Vafaei 36', 38'; Shamsaei 38'	Report	Tomic 24'; Kobeissy 25'

Bangkok Arena, Bangkok
Attendance: 4,000
Referee: Chan Ka Chung (Hong Kong)

=== Group C ===
Pos	Team	Pld	W	D	L	GF	GA	GD	Pts	Qualification
1	(Iraq) Naft Al-Wasat	2	1	1	0	7	3	+4	4	Knockout stage
2	(United Arab Emirates) Dibba Al-Hisn	2	0	2	0	3	3	0	2	Knockout stage
3	(China) Dalian Yuan Dynasty	2	0	1	1	2	6	−4	1	

Source: AFC
Rules for classification: Group stage tiebreakers
15 July 2016
14:30

Naft Al-Wasat (Iraq)	2–2	(United Arab Emirates) Dibba Al-Hisn
Bahadori 18'; Hamzah 29'	Report	Claudio 6'; Mohamed 31'

Bangkok Arena, Bangkok
Attendance: 200
Referee: Rey Ritaga (Philippines)

16 July 2016
14:30

Dalian Yuan Dynasty (China)	1–1	(United Arab Emirates) Dibba Al-Hisn
Diogo 35'	Report	Abdalla 15'

Bangkok Arena, Bangkok
Attendance: 200
Referee: Scott Kidson (Australia)

17 July 2016
14:30

Naft Al-Wasat (Iraq)	5–1	(China) Dalian Yuan Dynasty
Hamzah 11', 22'; Jabbar 21'; Bahadori 23'; Tavakoli 36'	Report	Hamzah 28' (o.g.)

Bangkok Arena, Bangkok
Attendance: 300
Referee: Helday Idang (Malaysia)

=== Group D ===
Pos	Team	Pld	W	D	L	GF	GA	GD	Pts	Qualification
1	(Vietnam) Sanna Khánh Hòa	2	2	0	0	6	2	+4	6	Knockout stage
2	(Qatar) Al-Sadd	2	1	0	1	6	3	+3	3	Knockout stage
3	(Chinese Taipei) Taipower	2	0	0	2	0	7	−7	0	

Source: AFC
Rules for classification: Group stage tiebreakers
15 July 2016
12:00

Sanna Khánh Hòa (Vietnam)	3–0	(Chinese Taipei) Taipower
Nam 20'; Chi 30'; Thanh 38'	Report

Bangkok Arena, Bangkok
Attendance: 200
Referee: Husein Mahmoud Husein Khalaileh (Jordan)

16 July 2016
12:00

Al-Sadd (Qatar)	4–0	(Chinese Taipei) Taipower
Salem 15', 27'; Ali 29', 32'	Report

Bangkok Arena, Bangkok
Attendance: 200
Referee: Kozaki Tomohiro (Japan)

17 July 2016
12:00

Sanna Khánh Hòa (Vietnam)	3–2	(Qatar) Al-Sadd
Thanh 7'; Chi 16'; Bao 39'	Report	Salem 16'; Ismail 38'

Bangkok Arena, Bangkok
Attendance: 100
Referee: Ryan Shepheard (Australia)

== Knockout stage ==
In the knockout stage, extra time and penalty shoot-out were used to decide the winner if necessary (no extra time would be used in the third place match).

=== Bracket ===
Quarter-finals
July 19 – Bangkok
(Vietnam) Sanna Khánh Hòa	2
(United Arab Emirates) Dibba Al-Hisn	6
July 19 – Bangkok
(Iran) Tasisat Daryaei	2 (2)
(Japan) Nagoya Oceans (p)	2 (3)
July 19 – Bangkok
(Iraq) Naft Al-Wasat	2
(Qatar) Al-Sadd	1
July 19 – Bangkok
(Thailand) Chonburi Bluewave	4
(Uzbekistan) AGMK	1

Semi-finals
July 21 – Bangkok
(United Arab Emirates) Dibba Al-Hisn	1
(Japan) Nagoya Oceans	3
July 21 – Bangkok
(Iraq) Naft Al-Wasat (a.e.t.)	4
(Thailand) Chonburi Bluewave	1

Final
July 23 – Bangkok
(Japan) Nagoya Oceans (p)	4 (6)
(Iraq) Naft Al-Wasat	4 (5)
Third place
July 23 – Bangkok
(United Arab Emirates) Dibba Al-Hisn	1
(Thailand) Chonburi Bluewave	6

=== Quarter-finals ===
19 July 2016
12:00

Sanna Khánh Hòa (Vietnam)	2–6	(United Arab Emirates) Dibba Al-Hisn
Thanh 22'; Tuan 34'	Report	Salim 26', 32'; H.Mohamed 28'; A.Mohamed 36'; Ali 40'; Claudio 40'

Bangkok Arena, Bangkok
Attendance: 200
Referee: Nurdin Bukuev (Kyrgyzstan)

19 July 2016
14:45

Naft Al-Wasat (Iraq)	2–1	(Qatar) Al-Sadd
Hamzah 17'; Jabbar 20'	Report	Shahwani 10'

Bangkok Arena, Bangkok
Attendance: 400
Referee: Kobayashi Hiroyuki (Japan)

19 July 2016
17:15

Tasisat Daryaei (Iran)	2–2 (a.e.t.)	(Japan) Nagoya Oceans
Tayyebi 5'; Shamsaei 49'	Report	Sakai 16'; Saito 42'
Penalties
Sangsefidi (penalty scored); Raeisi (penalty scored); Ahmadabbasi (penalty missed)	2–3	(penalty scored) Ando; (penalty scored) Yoshikawa; (penalty scored) Serginho

Bangkok Arena, Bangkok
Attendance: 7,000
Referee: Ryan Shepheard (Australia)

19 July 2016
19:45

Chonburi Bluewave (Thailand)	4–1	(Uzbekistan) AGMK
Jetsada 12'; Suphawut 14'; Jirawat 17'; Xapa 36'	Report	Sharipov 1'

Bangkok Arena, Bangkok
Attendance: 10,600
Referee: An Ran (China)

=== Semi-finals ===
21 July 2016
16:00

Dibba Al-Hisn (United Arab Emirates)	1–3	(Japan) Nagoya Oceans
Zeid 4'	Report	Sakai 11'; Ando 13'; Yoshikawa 19'

Bangkok Arena, Bangkok
Attendance: 500
Referee: Rey Ritaga (Philippines)

21 July 2016
19:00

Naft Al-Wasat (Iraq)	4–1 (a.e.t.)	(Thailand) Chonburi Bluewave
Bahadori 40', 43' (pen.); Tavakoli 48'; Fahem 50'	Report	Jirawat 16'

Bangkok Arena, Bangkok
Attendance: 11,050
Referee: Truong Quoc Dung (Vietnam)

=== Third place play-off ===
23 July 2016
16:00

Dibba Al-Hisn (United Arab Emirates)	1–6	(Thailand) Chonburi Bluewave
Claudio 5'	Report	Thanatorn 15'; Sorasak 19'; Jirawat 32', 37'; Suphawut 34'; Ampol 39'

Bangkok Arena, Bangkok
Attendance: 7,000
Referee: Nurdin Bukuev (Kyrgyzstan)

=== Final ===
23 July 2016
19:00

Nagoya Oceans (Japan)	4–4 (a.e.t.)	(Iraq) Naft Al-Wasat
Yoshikawa 4'; Kento 14'; Sakai 39'; Ryuta 49'	Report	Bahadori 8'; Tavakoli 16'; Dakheel 33'; Serginho 43' (o.g.)
Penalties
Ando (penalty scored); Yoshikawa (penalty scored); Serginho (penalty scored); Mayedonchi (penalty scored); Sakai (penalty scored); Sekiguchi (penalty scored)	6–5	(penalty scored) Khalid; (penalty scored) Bahadori; (penalty scored) Tavakoli; (penalty scored) Dakheel; (penalty scored) Hussein; (penalty missed) Abdulmalek

Bangkok Arena, Bangkok
Attendance: 6,150
Referee: Ryan Shepheard (Australia)

== Awards ==
AFC Futsal Club Championship
2016 Champions

Nagoya Oceans
Third Title

- Most Valuable Player
  - (Iran) Farhad Tavakoli ( (Iraq) Naft Al-Wasat)
- Top Scorer
  - (Thailand) Jirawat Sornwichian (7 goals)
- Fair-Play Award
  - (United Arab Emirates) Dibba Al-Hisn
- All-Star Team
  - (Japan) Yushi Sekiguchi (Nagoya Oceans) (GK)
  - (Iran) Farhad Tavakoli (Naft Al-Wasat)
  - (Japan) Tomoki Yoshikawa (Nagoya Oceans)
  - (Thailand) Jirawat Sornwichian (Chonburi Bluewave)
  - (Iran) Ghodrat Bahadori (Naft Al-Wasat)
- Reserve All-Star Team
  - (Iraq) Ahmed Duraid (Naft Al-Wasat) (GK)
  - (United Arab Emirates) Karim Abou Zeid (Dibba Al-Hisn)
  - (Iraq) Mustafa Bachay Hamzah (Naft Al-Wasat)
  - (Thailand) Suphawut Thueanklang (Chonburi Bluewave)
  - (Iran) Hossein Tayebi (Tasisat Daryaei)
  - Coach: (Portugal) Pedro Costa (Nagoya Oceans)

== Statistics ==
=== Goalscorers ===
Rank	Player	Team	MD1	MD2	QF	SF	TF	F	Total
1	(Thailand) Jirawat Sornwichian	(Thailand) Chonburi Bluewave	2	1	1	1	2		7
2	(Iran) Hossein Tayebi	(Iran) Tasisat Daryaei	2	3	1				6
3	(Iran) Ghodrat Bahadori	(Iraq) Naft Al-Wasat	1	1		2		1	5
4	(Iraq) Mustafa Bachay Hamzah	(Iraq) Naft Al-Wasat	1	2	1				4
4	(Thailand) Suphawut Thueanklang	(Thailand) Chonburi Bluewave	1	1	1		1		4
4	(Japan) Rafael Sakai	(Japan) Nagoya Oceans	1		1	1		1	4
7	(Qatar) Abdullah Salem	(Qatar) Al-Sadd	2	1					3
7	(Iran) Farhad Tavakoli	(Iraq) Naft Al-Wasat		1		1		1	3
7	(Portugal) Mario Claudio	(United Arab Emirates) Dibba Al-Hisn	1		1		1		3
7	(Japan) Tomoki Yoshikawa	(Japan) Nagoya Oceans	1			1		1	3

=== Tournament team rankings ===
As per statistical convention in football, matches decided in extra time are counted as wins and losses, while matches decided by penalty shoot-outs are counted as draws.

Pos	Team	Pld	W	D	L	GF	GA	GD	Pts	Final result
1st place, gold medalist(s)	(Japan) Nagoya Oceans	5	1	3	1	10	10	0	6	Champions
2nd place, silver medalist(s)	(Iraq) Naft Al-Wasat	5	3	2	0	15	7	+8	11	Runners-up
3rd place, bronze medalist(s)	(Thailand) Chonburi Bluewave (H)	5	4	0	1	20	10	+10	12	Third place
4	(United Arab Emirates) Dibba Al-Hisn	5	1	2	2	11	14	−3	5	Fourth place
5	(Iran) Tasisat Daryaei	3	2	1	0	12	7	+5	7	Eliminated in quarter-finals
6	(Qatar) Al-Sadd	3	1	0	2	7	5	+2	3	Eliminated in quarter-finals
7	(Uzbekistan) AGMK	3	0	1	2	6	10	−4	1	Eliminated in quarter-finals
8	(Vietnam) Sanna Khánh Hòa	3	2	0	1	8	8	0	6	Eliminated in quarter-finals
9	(Australia) Vic Vipers	2	0	1	1	5	8	−3	1	Eliminated in group stage
10	(Lebanon) Al-Mayadeen	2	0	1	1	4	8	−4	1	Eliminated in group stage
11	(China) Dalian Yuan Dynasty	2	0	1	1	2	6	−4	1	Eliminated in group stage
12	(Chinese Taipei) Taipower	2	0	0	2	0	7	−7	0	Eliminated in group stage

Source: Page=82
(H) Hosts
