= Muruntau =

- urban-type settlement
- Location in Uzbekistan
- Coordinates: 41°31′36″N 65°35′54″E
- Country: Uzbekistan
- Region: Navoiy Region
- City: Zarafshon
- Urban-type settlement: 1976

Population (2002)
  - Total: 4,320
- Time zone: UTC+5 (UZT)

Muruntau (Uzbek: Muruntov/Мурунтов, Russian: Мурунтау) is an urban-type settlement in the Navoiy Region, Uzbekistan. Administratively, it is part of the city Zarafshon. The town's population in 1989 was 9193 people.

== Economy ==
Near Muruntau in the Kyzylkum, also spelled Kyzyl Kum or Qizilqum, is the largest gold mine in the world the open pit Muruntau mine which is part of the Zarafshan gold complex and was operated by the Navoi Mining and Metallurgical Company (NMMC) though its Central Mining Administration (CMA) since 1964.
