= 2015 AFC Futsal Club Championship =

- Competition's logo

Tournament details
- Host country: Iran
- City: Isfahan
- Dates: 31 July – 7 August 2015
- Teams: 12 (from 12 associations)
- Venue: 1 (in 1 host city)

Final positions
- Champions: (Iran) Tasisat Daryaei (1st title)
- Runners-up: (Kuwait) Al-Qadsia
- Third place: (Vietnam) Thái Sơn Nam
- Fourth place: (Iraq) Naft Al-Wasat

Tournament statistics
- Matches played: 20
- Goals scored: 143 (7.15 per match)
- Attendance: 13,890 (695 per match)
- Top scorer: (Iran) Vahid Shamsaei (10 goals)
- Best player: (Iran) Vahid Shamsaei
- Fair play award: (Vietnam) Thái Sơn Nam

The 2015 AFC Futsal Club Championship was the 6th edition of the AFC Futsal Club Championship, the annual Asian futsal club championship organized by the Asian Football Confederation (AFC). The tournament was held in Isfahan, Iran between July 31 and August 7, 2015.

== Qualified teams ==
Locations of clubs in 2015 AFC Futsal Club Championship

A total of 12 teams from 12 AFC member associations participated in the tournament. Tasisat Daryaei of Iran, as the representatives of the host association, and Nagoya Oceans of Japan, as the defending champions, automatically qualified for the finals. The other teams are from Thailand, China, Uzbekistan, Kuwait, Kyrgyzstan, Qatar, Vietnam, United Arab Emirates, Iraq, and Lebanon.

Association	Team	Qualified as
Iran	Tasisat Daryaei	Host representatives / 2014–15 Iranian Futsal Super League champions
Japan	Nagoya Oceans	2014 AFC Futsal Club Championship champions / 2014–15 F. League champions
Thailand	Chonburi Blue Wave	2014–15 Thailand Futsal League champions
China	Shenzhen Nanling	2013–14 Chinese Futsal League champions
Uzbekistan	Lokomotiv Tashkent	2014 Uzbekistan Futsal League champions
Kuwait	Al-Qadsia	2013–14 Kuwaiti Futsal League champions
Kyrgyzstan	MFC Emgek	2014–15 Kyrgyzstan Futsal League champions
Qatar	Al-Rayyan	2014–15 Qatar Futsal League champions
Vietnam	Thái Sơn Nam	2014 Vietnam Futsal League champions
(United Arab Emirates) United Arab Emirates	Al-Khaleej	2013–14 UAE Futsal League champions
Iraq	Naft Al-Wasat	2014–15 Iraq Futsal League champions
Lebanon	Bank of Beirut	2014–15 Lebanon Futsal League champions

== Venue ==
Isfahan
Naghsh-e-Jahan Arena
Capacity: 6,000

== Draw ==
The draw was held on 10 June 2015 in Isfahan. The 12 teams were drawn into four groups of three teams (one seeded team and two unseeded teams). Besides the team from the host association Iran, the teams from Japan, Thailand, and China were also seeded as per the final ranking of the 2014 AFC Futsal Club Championship.

Pot 1 (seeded)	Pot 2 (unseeded)
(Iran) Tasisat Daryaei; (Japan) Nagoya Oceans; (China) Shenzhen Nanling; (Thailand) Chonburi Blue Wave	(Iraq) Naft Al-Wasat; (Kyrgyzstan) MFC Emgek; (Kuwait) Al-Qadsia; (Lebanon) Bank of Beirut; (Qatar) Al-Rayyan; (United Arab Emirates) Al-Khaleej; (Uzbekistan) Lokomotiv Tashkent; (Vietnam) Thái Sơn Nam

== Group stage ==
The top two teams of each group advanced to the quarter-finals.

Tiebreakers

The teams were ranked according to points (3 points for a win, 1 point for a draw, 0 points for a loss). If tied on points, tiebreakers would be applied in the following order:

1. Greater number of points obtained in the group matches between the teams concerned;
2. Goal difference resulting from the group matches between the teams concerned;
3. Greater number of goals scored in the group matches between the teams concerned;
4. If, after applying criteria 1 to 3, teams still have an equal ranking, criteria 1 to 3 is reapplied exclusively to the matches between the teams in question to determine their final rankings. If this procedure does not lead to a decision, criteria 5 to 9 apply;
5. Goal difference in all the group matches;
6. Greater number of goals scored in all the group matches;
7. Penalty shoot-out if only two teams are involved and they are both on the field of play;
8. Fewer score calculated according to the number of yellow and red cards received in the group matches (1 point for a single yellow card, 3 points for a red card as a consequence of two yellow cards, 3 points for a direct red card, 4 points for a yellow card followed by a direct red card);
9. Drawing of lots.

All times are local, IRDT (UTC+3:30).

=== Group A ===
Pos	Team	Pld	W	D	L	GF	GA	GD	Pts	Qualification
1	(Iran) Tasisat Daryaei (H)	2	2	0	0	17	3	+14	6	Knockout stage
2	(Kuwait) Al-Qadsia	2	1	0	1	11	10	+1	3	Knockout stage
3	(United Arab Emirates) Al-Khaleej	2	0	0	2	2	17	−15	0	

Source: AFC
Rules for classification: Group stage tiebreakers
(H) Hosts
31 July 2015
19:30

Tasisat Daryaei (Iran)	8–1	(United Arab Emirates) Al-Khaleej
Abolghasem Orouji 2'; Majid Raeisi 8'; Vahid Shamsaei 9', 29'; Mohammad Keshavarz 12'; Saeid Ahmadabbasi 18'; Ghodrat Bahadori 18'; Ali Asghar Hassanzadeh 21'	Report	Yousif Mohamed 19'

Naghsh-e-Jahan Arena, Isfahan
Attendance: 1,000
Referee: Helday Idang (Malaysia)

1 August 2015
19:30

Al-Qadsia (Kuwait)	9–1	(United Arab Emirates) Al-Khaleej
Abdulrahman Altawail 6', 27', 38'; Dario Teodoro Goncalves 14', 22'; Hamad Hayat 20'; Mohammad Taheri 25', 33'; Abdulrahman Al Wadi 36'	Report	Yousif Mohamed 8'

Naghsh-e-Jahan Arena, Isfahan
Attendance: 100
Referee: Liu Jianqiao (China)

2 August 2015
19:30

Tasisat Daryaei (Iran)	9–2	(Kuwait) Al-Qadsia
Mohammad Reza Sangsefidi 4'; Mohammad Zareei 9'; Vahid Shamsaei 24', 26', 28', 31'; Ali Asghar Hassanzadeh 32', 33'; Ali Ebrahimi 36'	Report	Abdulrahman Al Wadi 7'; Rafael de Souza 35'

Naghsh-e-Jahan Arena, Isfahan
Attendance: 1,200
Referee: Lee Po-Fu (Chinese Taipei)

=== Group B ===
Pos	Team	Pld	W	D	L	GF	GA	GD	Pts	Qualification
1	(Kyrgyzstan) MFC Emgek	2	1	1	0	10	5	+5	4	Knockout stage
2	(Japan) Nagoya Oceans	2	1	1	0	7	4	+3	4	Knockout stage
3	(Uzbekistan) Lokomotiv Tashkent	2	0	0	2	5	13	−8	0	

Source: AFC
Rules for classification: Group stage tiebreakers
31 July 2015
17:00

Nagoya Oceans (Japan)	5–2	(Uzbekistan) Lokomotiv Tashkent
Yoshio Sakai 3', 19'; Hoshi Ryuta 22'; Maedonchi Matis Hernan 32'; Pedro Costa 34'	Report	Sanjar Ziyakhanov 17'; Aleksandr Shin 37'

Naghsh-e-Jahan Arena, Isfahan
Attendance: 300
Referee: Truong Quoc Dung (Vietnam)

1 August 2015
17:00

MFC Emgek (Kyrgyzstan)	8–3	(Uzbekistan) Lokomotiv Tashkent
Ilias 2', 38'; Salamat Mambetaliev 13'; Ruslan 21', 39'; Akparaly Danibaev 24'; Rustam Ermekov 37'; Ruslan Gafurov 40'	Report	Feruz Fakhriddinov 6'; Sarvar Shaakhmedov 19'; Tokhir Abdurazzakov 26'

Naghsh-e-Jahan Arena, Isfahan
Attendance: 250
Referee: Hasan Mohammed Mousa Al-Gbur (Iraq)

2 August 2015
17:00

Nagoya Oceans (Japan)	2–2	(Kyrgyzstan) MFC Emgek
Serginho Rodrigo 14'; Kaoru Morioka 36'	Report	Rustam Ermekov 10'; Ruslan Gafurov 40'

Naghsh-e-Jahan Arena, Isfahan
Attendance: 200
Referee: Truong Quoc Dung (Vietnam)

=== Group C ===
Pos	Team	Pld	W	D	L	GF	GA	GD	Pts	Qualification
1	(Iraq) Naft Al-Wasat	2	1	0	1	5	5	0	3	Knockout stage
2	(Qatar) Al-Rayyan	2	1	0	1	4	4	0	3	Knockout stage
3	(Thailand) Chonburi Blue Wave	2	1	0	1	4	4	0	3	

Source: AFC
Rules for classification: Group stage tiebreakers
31 July 2015
14:30

Chonburi Blue Wave (Thailand)	3–2	(Iraq) Naft Al-Wasat
Jirawat Sornwichian 17', 29'; Sarawut Jaipech 28'	Report	Waleed Khalid Fahem 28', 31'

Naghsh-e-Jahan Arena, Isfahan
Attendance: 300
Referee: Hiroyuki Kobayashi (Japan)

1 August 2015
14:30

Al-Rayyan (Qatar)	2–3	(Iraq) Naft Al-Wasat
Lucas Oliveira 38'; Rashid Yousuf 37'	Report	Firas Mohammad Abed 14'; Mohammad Naser Safari 27', 37'

Naghsh-e-Jahan Arena, Isfahan
Attendance: 250
Referee: Lee Po-Fu (Chinese Taipei)

2 August 2015
14:30

Chonburi Blue Wave (Thailand)	1–2	(Qatar) Al-Rayyan
Kritsada Wongkaeo 28'	Report	Diego Costa 27'; Flavio Barreto Aravtes 37'

Naghsh-e-Jahan Arena, Isfahan
Attendance: 100
Referee: Hawkar Salar Ahmed (Iraq)

=== Group D ===
Pos	Team	Pld	W	D	L	GF	GA	GD	Pts	Qualification
1	(Vietnam) Thái Sơn Nam	2	1	1	0	8	4	+4	4	Knockout stage
2	(Lebanon) Bank of Beirut	2	1	1	0	8	6	+2	4	Knockout stage
3	(China) Shenzhen Nanling	2	0	0	2	4	10	−6	0	

Source: AFC
Rules for classification: Group stage tiebreakers
31 July 2015
12:00

Shenzhen Nanling (China)	1–5	(Vietnam) Thái Sơn Nam
Zeng Liang 19'	Report	Saul Olmo Campana 27', 38', 39'; Trần Long Vũ 30'; Lê Quốc Nam 36'

Naghsh-e-Jahan Arena, Isfahan
Attendance: 140
Referee: Vahid Arzpeyma (Iran)

1 August 2015
12:00

Bank of Beirut (Lebanon)	3–3	(Vietnam) Thái Sơn Nam
Rudolpho Da Costa 1', 25'; Ahmad Kheireldine 31'	Report	Trần Văn Vũ 9'; Ahmad Kheireldine 20' (o.g.); Ngô Ngọc Sơn 26'

Naghsh-e-Jahan Arena, Isfahan
Attendance: 125
Referee: Rey Ritaga (Philippines)

2 August 2015
12:00

Shenzhen Nanling (China)	3–5	(Lebanon) Bank of Beirut
Lu Yue 13'; Eder Luan Schader 22'; Ahmad Esmaeilpour 23'	Report	Rudolpho Da Costa 10', 11'; Mohamad Kobeissy 13'; Mahdi Javid 39'; Hussein Hamadani 40'

Naghsh-e-Jahan Arena, Isfahan
Attendance: 175
Referee: Hiroyuki Kobayashi (Japan)

== Knockout stage ==
In the knockout stage, the extra time and penalty shoot-out were used to decide the winner if necessary (no extra time would be used in the third-place match).

=== Bracket ===
Quarter-finals
August 4 – Isfahan
(Vietnam) Thái Sơn Nam	2
(Qatar) Al-Rayyan	1
August 4 – Isfahan
(Kyrgyzstan) MFC Emgek	1
(Kuwait) Al-Qadsia	4
August 4 – Isfahan
(Iraq) Naft Al-Wasat (p)	4 (3)
(Lebanon) Bank of Beirut	4 (2)
August 4 – Isfahan
(Iran) Tasisat Daryaei	4
(Japan) Nagoya Oceans	3

Semi-finals
August 5 – Isfahan
(Vietnam) Thái Sơn Nam	3 (1)
(Kuwait) Al-Qadsia (p)	3 (2)
August 5 – Isfahan
(Iraq) Naft Al-Wasat	3
(Iran) Tasisat Daryaei	7

Final
August 7 – Isfahan
(Kuwait) Al-Qadsia	4
(Iran) Tasisat Daryaei	5
Third place
August 7 – Isfahan
(Vietnam) Thái Sơn Nam	7
(Iraq) Naft Al-Wasat	3

=== Quarter-finals ===
4 August 2015
12:00

Thái Sơn Nam (Vietnam)	2–1	(Qatar) Al-Rayyan
Saul Olmo Campana 1'; Trần Long Vũ 3'	Report	Ngô Đình Thuận 12' (o.g.)

Naghsh-e-Jahan Arena, Isfahan
Attendance: 100
Referee: Tomohiro Kozaki (Japan)

4 August 2015
14:30

Naft Al-Wasat (Iraq)	4–4 (a.e.t.)	(Lebanon) Bank of Beirut
Mohammad Nasser Safari 14', 25', 32'; Waleed Khalid Fahem 28'	Report	Rudolpho Da Costa 5'; Ahmad Kheireldine 15'; Karim Zeid 17', 36'
Penalties
Behzad Fereydoun (penalty scored); Waleed Khalid Fahem (penalty scored); Mohammad Nasser Safari (penalty scored)	3–2	(penalty scored) Ahmad Kheireldine; (penalty scored) Karim Zeid; (penalty missed) Hassan Hammoud

Naghsh-e-Jahan Arena, Isfahan
Attendance: 230
Referee: Chris Colley (Australia)

4 August 2015
17:00

MFC Emgek (Kyrgyzstan)	1–4	(Kuwait) Al-Qadsia
Rustam Ermekov 40'	Report	Rafael de Souza 12', 37'; Mohammad Taheri 16'; Abdulrahman Altawail 27'

Naghsh-e-Jahan Arena, Isfahan
Attendance: 300
Referee: Ali Reza Sohrabi Balsini (Iran)

4 August 2015
19:30

Tasisat Daryaei (Iran)	4–3	(Japan) Nagoya Oceans
Vahid Shamsaei 7', 38'; Mohammad Reza Sangsefidi 21'; Mohammad Zareei 39'	Report	Yoshio Sakai 2'; Kaoru Morioka 34', 40'

Naghsh-e-Jahan Arena, Isfahan
Attendance: 2,300
Referee: Nurdin Bukuev (Kyrgyzstan)

=== Semi-finals ===
5 August 2015
16:30

Thái Sơn Nam (Vietnam)	3–3 (a.e.t.)	(Kuwait) Al-Qadsia
Trần Văn Vũ 2'; Phùng Trọng Luân 22'; Artur Yunusov 36'	Report	Abdulrahman Al Wadi 5', 6'; Mohammad Taheri 16'
Penalties
Nguyễn Bảo Quân (penalty scored); Trần Văn Vũ (penalty missed); Artur Yunusov (penalty missed)	1–2	(penalty scored) Meshari Alnakkas; (penalty scored) Rafael de Souza; (penalty missed) Mohammad Taheri

Naghsh-e-Jahan Arena, Isfahan
Attendance: 250
Referee: Nurdin Bukuev (Kyrgyzstan)

5 August 2015
19:30

Naft Al-Wasat (Iraq)	3–7	(Iran) Tasisat Daryaei
Mohammad Nasser Safari 4'; Rafid Hameed Eesa 15'; Ali Abdulelah Hameed 36'	Report	Ghodrat Bahadori 2'; Majid Raeisi 12', 14', 31'; Mohammad Keshavarz 17'; Mohammad Reza Sangsefidi 21'; Vahid Shamsaei 40'

Naghsh-e-Jahan Arena, Isfahan
Attendance: 1,785
Referee: Chris Colley (Australia)

=== Third place play-off ===
7 August 2015
16:30

Thái Sơn Nam (Vietnam)	7–3	(Iraq) Naft Al-Wasat
Trần Long Vũ 1'; Nguyễn Minh Trí 12', 23'; Mohammad Naser Safari 15' (o.g.); Trần Văn Vũ 29', 40'; Lê Quốc Nam 32'	Report	Mohammad Nasser Safari 7'; Waleed Khalid Fahem 23'; Ali Abdulelah Hameed 26'

Naghsh-e-Jahan Arena, Isfahan
Attendance: 285
Referee: Ali Reza Sohrabi Balsini (Iran)

=== Final ===
7 August 2015
19:30

Al-Qadsia (Kuwait)	4–5	(Iran) Tasisat Daryaei
Hamad Hayat 23'; Abdulrahman Al Wadi 37', 39'; Abdulrahman Altawail 40'	Report	Ali Asghar Hassanzadeh 2', 38'; Ghodrat Bahadori 7'; Mohammad Reza Sangsefidi 22'; Vahid Shamsaei 36'

Naghsh-e-Jahan Arena, Isfahan
Attendance: 4,500
Referee: Scott Kidson (Australia)

== Awards ==
AFC Futsal Club Championship
2015 Champions

Tasisat Daryaei
First Title

- Most Valuable Player
  - (Iran) Vahid Shamsaei
- Top Scorer
  - (Iran) Vahid Shamsaei (10 goals)
- Fair-Play Award
  - (Vietnam) Thái Sơn Nam
- All-Star Team
  - (Iran) Mostafa Nazari (Tasisat Daryaei) (GK)
  - (Iran) Vahid Shamsaei (Tasisat Daryaei)
  - (Iran) Ali Asghar Hassanzadeh (Tasisat Daryaei)
  - (Kuwait) Abdulrahman Al Wadi (Al-Qadsia)
  - (Iran) Mohammad Taheri (Al-Qadsia)
- Reserve All-Star Team
  - (Kyrgyzstan) Kirill Ermolov (MFC Emgek) (GK)
  - (Vietnam) Saul Olmo Campana (Thái Sơn Nam)
  - (Kuwait) Abdulrahman Altawail (Al-Qadsia)
  - (Vietnam) Trần Long Vũ (Thái Sơn Nam)
  - (Iran) Mohammad Nasser Safari (Naft Al-Wasat)
  - Coach: (Iran) Amir Shamsaei (Tasisat Daryaei)

== Top goalscorers ==
Rank	Player	Team	Goals
1	Vahid Shamsaei	(Iran) Tasisat Daryaei	10
2	Mohammad Nasser Safari	(Iraq) Naft Al-Wasat	7
3	Abdulrahman Al Wadi	(Kuwait) Al-Qadsia	6
4	Ali Asghar Hassanzadeh	(Iran) Tasisat Daryaei	5
4	Rudolpho Da Costa	(Lebanon) Bank of Beirut	5
4	Abdulrahman Altawail	(Kuwait) Al-Qadsia	5
7	Mohammad Taheri	(Kuwait) Al-Qadsia	4
7	Saul Olmo Campana	(Vietnam) Thái Sơn Nam	4
7	Trần Văn Vũ	(Vietnam) Thái Sơn Nam	4
7	Mohammad Reza Sangsefidi	(Iran) Tasisat Daryaei	4
7	Waleed Khalid Fahem	(Iraq) Naft Al-Wasat	4
7	Majid Raeisi	(Iran) Tasisat Daryaei	4

Source: the-AFC.com

== Final standing ==
Rank	Team
1st place, gold medalist(s)	(Iran) Tasisat Daryaei
2nd place, silver medalist(s)	(Kuwait) Al-Qadsia
3rd place, bronze medalist(s)	(Vietnam) Thái Sơn Nam
4	(Iraq) Naft Al-Wasat
5	(Lebanon) Bank of Beirut
6	(Japan) Nagoya Oceans
7	(Qatar) Al-Rayyan
8	(Kyrgyzstan) MFC Emgek
9	(Thailand) Chonburi Blue Wave
10	(China) Shenzhen Nanling
11	(Uzbekistan) Lokomotiv Tashkent
12	(United Arab Emirates) Al-Khaleej
