= Tasisat Daryaei FSC =

Iranian futsal club

- Full name: Tasisat Daryaei Futsal Club
- Nickname: Tasisat
- Founded: 2012
- Dissolved: April 2018
- Ground: Futsal Federation Arena, Tehran
- Owner: Iranian Offshore Engineering and Construction Company (IOEC)
- Chairman: (Iran) Majid Halaji
- Head Coach: (Iran) Vahid Shamsaei
- League: Iranian Futsal Super League
- 2017-18: 2nd
- Website: http://iocsclub.ir/

Tasisat Daryaei Futsal Club (Persian: باشگاه فوتسال شرکت مهندسی و ساخت تأسیسات دریایی ایران) was an Iranian futsal club based in Tehran.

== Season-by-season ==
The table below chronicles the achievements of the club in various competitions.

Season	League										international	Hazfi	League's top goalscorer		Manager
Season	Division		P	W	D	L	GF	GA	Pts	Pos	international	Hazfi	Name	Goals	Manager
2012–13	1st Division	Group stage	Replaced for Steel Azin										??	??	?? - Hossein Shams
2012–13	1st Division	Group stage	14	9	1	4	57	36	28	2nd			??	??	?? - Hossein Shams
2012–13	1st Division	Play Off	Tasisat Daryaei 6 - 5 Nik Andish Shahrdari Isfahan										??	??	?? - Hossein Shams
2012–13	1st Division	Play Off	2	1	1	0	6	5	4	-			??	??	?? - Hossein Shams
2013-14	Futsal Super League		26	8	6	12	66	77	30	10^{1}		Semi-Final	Saeed Ahmadabbasi, Mohammad Zarei, Ali Ebrahimi	9	Ali Sanei
2013-14	Hazfi Cup	Fourth Round	Tasisat Daryaei 6 – 1 Payam Valiasr Arak									Semi-Final	??	??	Ali Sanei
2013-14	Hazfi Cup	Fifth Round	Tasisat Daryaei 3 – 2 Ali Sadr Hamedan									Semi-Final	??	??	Ali Sanei
2013-14	Hazfi Cup	Quarter-finals	Tasisat Daryaei 5 – 1 Pas Qavamin									Semi-Final	??	??	Ali Sanei
2013-14	Hazfi Cup	Semi-Final	Tasisat Daryaei (w/o) Misagh Tehran									Semi-Final	??	??	Ali Sanei
2014-15	Futsal Super League		26	14	9	3	64	40	51	1st	Champions		Vahid Shamsaei	18	Vahid Shamsaei
2014-15	AFC Futsal Club Championship	Group stage	3	3	0	0	17	3	9	1st	Champions		Vahid Shamsaei	10	Amir Shamsaei
2014-15	AFC Futsal Club Championship	Quarter-finals	Tasisat Daryaei 4 - 3 (Japan) Nagoya Oceans								Champions		Vahid Shamsaei	10	Amir Shamsaei
2014-15	AFC Futsal Club Championship	Semi-finals	Tasisat Daryaei 7 - 3 (Iraq) Naft Al-Wasat								Champions		Vahid Shamsaei	10	Amir Shamsaei
2014-15	AFC Futsal Club Championship	Finals	Tasisat Daryaei 5 - 4 (Kuwait) Al Qadsia								Champions		Vahid Shamsaei	10	Amir Shamsaei
2015-16	Futsal Super League		25	16	4	5	98	58	52	1st	8th		Ali Asghar Hassanzadeh	29	Vahid Shamsaei
2015-16	Intercontinental Futsal Cup	Group stage	3	0	1	2	7	10	1	4th	8th		Hossein Tayyebi	2	Amir Shamsaei
2015-16	Intercontinental Futsal Cup	Seventh-place match	Tasisat Daryaei 1 - 2 (Portugal) Sport Lisboa								8th		Hossein Tayyebi	2	Amir Shamsaei
2016-17	Futsal Super League		26	16	2	8	79	56	50	5th	5th		Alireza Vafaei	13	Vahid Shamsaei
2016-17	AFC Futsal Club Championship	Group stage	2	2	0	0	10	5	6	1st	5th		Hossein Tayyebi	6	Amir Shamsaei
2016-17	AFC Futsal Club Championship	Quarter-finals	Tasisat Daryaei 2(2) - 2(3) (Japan) Nagoya Oceans								5th		Hossein Tayyebi	6	Amir Shamsaei
2017-18	Futsal Super League		26	19	2	5	106	68	59	2nd			Mahdi Javid	35	Reza Nasseri
Super League Total			129	73	23	33	413	299	242						
AFC Futsal Club Championship Total			9	8	1	0	45	20	25						
Hazfi Cup Total			3	3	0	0	14	4	12						
1st Division Total			16	10	2	4	63	41	32						
Intercontinental Total			4	0	1	3	8	12	1						
Total			161	94	27	40	543	376	312						

Notes:
* unofficial titles
1 worst title in history of club

Key

- P = Played
- W = Games won
- D = Games drawn
- L = Games lost
- GF = Goals for
- GA = Goals against
- Pts = Points
- Pos = Final position

Champions	Runners-up	Third Place	Fourth Place	Did not qualify	not held

== Honors ==
National:

- Iranian Futsal Super League
  - Champions (2): 2014-15 - 2015-16
  - Runners-up (1): 2017–18
- Iran Futsal's 1st Division
  - Champions (1): 2012-13

Continental:

- AFC Futsal Club Championship
  - Champions (1): 2015
- AFC futsal team of the year (1): 2015

Individual

- Best player:
  - Asian Futsaler of the Year:
    - 2015 – (Iran) Vahid Shamsaei
  - AFC Futsal Club Championship MVP Award:
    - 2015 - (Iran) Vahid Shamsaei
  - Iranian Futsal Super League
    - 2017-18 – (Iran) Mahdi Javid
- Top Goalscorer:
  - Iranian Futsal Super League:
    - 2015–16 Iranian Futsal Super League: (Iran) Ali Asghar Hassanzadeh (29)
    - 2017–18 Iranian Futsal Super League: (Iran) Mahdi Javid (35)
  - AFC Futsal Club Championship:
    - 2015 AFC Futsal Club Championship: (Iran) Vahid Shamsaei (10)
- Best Team:
  - AFC futsal team of the 2015
  - Best Team of the 2016–17 Iranian Futsal Super League

== First-team squad ==
Note: Flags indicate national team as defined under FIFA eligibility rules; some limited exceptions apply. Players may hold more than one non-FIFA nationality.

No.	Pos.	Nation	Player
1	GK	IRN	Mahdi Mostafaei
4	DF	IRN	Mohammad Keshavarz
5	DF	IRN	Hamid Ahmadi
6	DF	IRN	Mohammad Reza Sangsefidi
12	DF	IRN	Ali Asghar Hassanzadeh
8	FW	IRN	Abolghasem Orouji
9	FW	IRN	Ali Ebrahimi
9	FW	IRN	Vahid Shamsaei

No.	Pos.	Nation	Player
10	DF	IRN	Majid Raesei
11	FW	IRN	Saeed Ahmadabbasi
12	GK	IRN	Mostafa Nazari
7	FW	IRN	Mohammad Zarei
16	GK	IRN	Vahid Seifan
17	DF	IRN	Ghodrat Bahadori
19	DF	IRN	Mohsen Montazemi
31		IRN	Ali Bahadori

Achievements
Preceded by Dabiri Tabriz	Iranian Futsal Super League; 14-15 (First title); 15-16 (Second title)	Succeeded by Giti Pasand Isfahan
Preceded by Nagoya Oceans (Japan)	AFC Futsal Club Championship; 2015 (First title)	Succeeded by Nagoya Oceans (Japan)
