= Farhad Tavakoli =

Iranian futsal player

Personal information
- Full name: Farhad Tavakoli Rouzbahani
- Date of birth: 14 January 1989 (age 37)
- Place of birth: Ahvaz, Iran
- Height: 1.79 m (5 ft 10 in)
- Positions: Defender; winger

Team information
- Current team: Giti Pasand
- Number: 18

Senior career*
Years	Team	Apps	(Gls)
2005–2010	Gaz		
2010–2014	Melli Haffari		
2014–2015	Farsh Ara		(7)
2015–2018	Melli Haffari		(38)
2016	→ Naft Al Wasat (loan)		
2017	→ Naft Al Wasat (loan)		
2018	→ Naft Al Wasat (loan)		
2018–2019	Qingdao Impulse Chenxi		
2019	Naft Al Wasat		
2019–2020	Kuwait SC		
2020–	Giti Pasand		(18)

International career^{‡}
- Iran U23
2012–	Iran		
- * Club domestic league appearances and goals as of 8 October 2022 ‡ National team caps and goals as of 25 January 2022

Farhad Tavakoli Rouzbahani (Persian: فرهاد توکلی روزبهانی; born 14 January 1989) is an Iranian professional futsal player. He is currently a member of Giti Pasand in the Iranian Futsal Super League.

== Honours ==
=== Country ===
- FIFA Futsal World Cup
  - Third place (1): 2016
- AFC Futsal Championship
  - Champion (2): 2016–2018
  - Runners-up (1): 2014
- Asian Indoor and Martial Arts Games
  - Champion (2): 2013–2017
- Grand Prix
  - Runner-Up (1): 2015

=== Club ===
- AFC Futsal Club Championship
  - Runner-Up (1): 2016 (Naft Al Wasat)
- Iraq Futsal League
  - Champion (3): 2015–16 (Naft Al Wasat), 2016–17 (Naft Al Wasat), 2017–18 (Naft Al Wasat)

=== Individual ===
- Best player:
  - * MVP – AFC Futsal Club Championship: 2016

Sporting positions
Preceded by (Iran) Vahid Shamsaei	AFC Futsal Club Championship MVP; 2016	Succeeded by (Iran) Ali Asghar Hassanzadeh
