= Mohammad Reza Sangsefidi =

Iranian futsal player (born 1989)

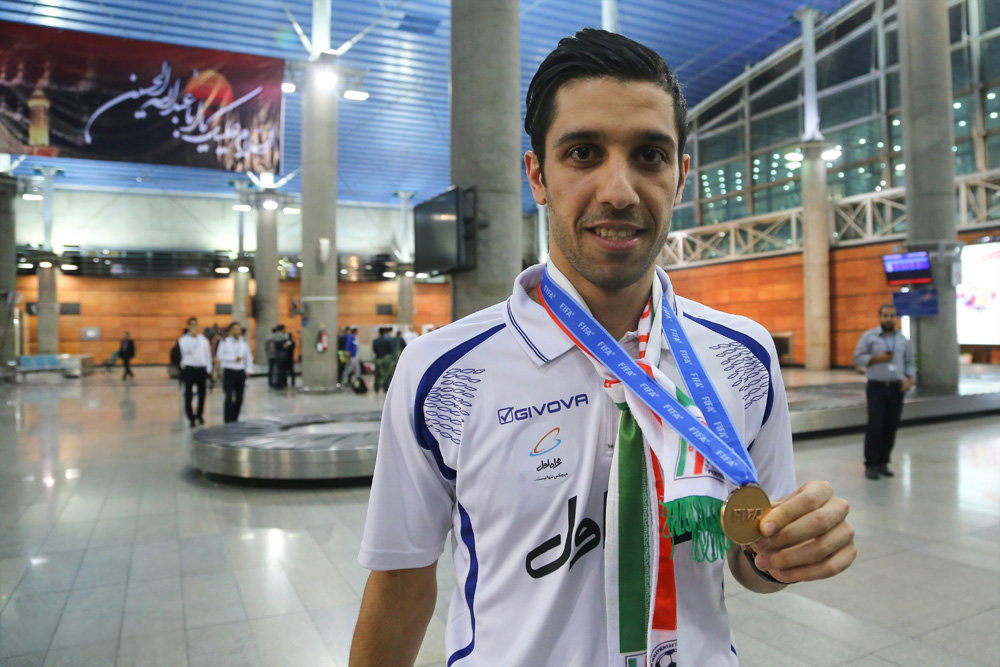

Personal information
- Full name: Mohammad Reza Sangsefidi
- Date of birth: 2 November 1989 (age 36)
- Place of birth: Tehran, Iran
- Height: 1.73 m (5 ft 8 in)
- Position: Left flank

Team information
- Current team: Mes Sungun
- Number: 6

Senior career*
Years	Team	Apps	(Gls)
2013–2014	Dabiri		(8)
2014–2017	Tasisat Daryaei		(19)
2017–2019	Mes Sungun		(9)
2019	Sipar Khujand		
2019–2022	Giti Pasand		(19)
2022–	Mes Sungun		

International career^{‡}
- Iran U23
2013–	Iran		(5)
- * Club domestic league appearances and goals as of 13 August 2022 ‡ National team caps and goals as of 17 September 2020

Mohammad Reza Sangsefidi (Persian: محمدرضا سنگ‌سفیدی; born 2 November 1989) is an Iranian professional futsal player. He is currently a member of Mes Sungun and the Iran national futsal team.

== Honours ==
=== Country ===
- FIFA Futsal World Cup
  - Third place (1): 2016
- AFC Futsal Championship
  - Champion (2): 2016 - 2018
- Grand Prix
  - Runner-Up (1): 2015
  - Third Place (1): 2014
- Asian Indoor Games
  - Champion (1): 2017
- Chinese Touring
  - Champion (1): 2013

=== Club ===
- AFC Futsal Club Championship
  - Champion (2): 2015 (Tasisat Daryaei), 2018 (Mes Sungun)
- Iranian Futsal Super League
  - Champions (6): 2013–14 (Dabiri), 2014–15 (Tasisat Daryaei), 2015–16 (Tasisat Daryaei), 2017–18 (Mes Sungun), 2018–19 (Mes Sungun), 2021–22 (Giti Pasand)

== International goals ==
#	Date	Venue	Opponent	Score	Result	Competition
1	7 January 2015	(Croatia) Športno društvo Novigrad, Novigrad	Croatia	1 – 0	2 – 0	Friendly
2	21 August 2016	(Thailand) Bangkok Arena, Bangkok	Thailand	3 – 1	5 – 7	2016 Thailand Five's
3	5 December 2016	(Iran) Handball Federation Arena, Tehran	Russia	4 – 2	6 – 4	Friendly
4	23 September 2017	(Turkmenistan) Ice Palace Hall 1, Ashgabat	Thailand	1 – 1	10 – 4	2017 Asian Indoor Games
5	23 September 2018	(Iran) Shahid Poursharifi, Tabriz	Belarus	2 – 1	3 – 1	Tabriz 2018
6	1 December 2019	(Iran) Shahid Beheshti Arena, Mashhad	Slovakia	1 – 1	5 – 5	Mashhad 2019
7	1 December 2019	(Iran) Shahid Beheshti Arena, Mashhad	Slovakia	2 – 2	3 – 1	Mashhad 2019
