= Muruntau gold deposit =

Gold deposit in the Qizilqum Desert, Uzbekistan

Coordinates: 41°29′54″N 64°34′18″E

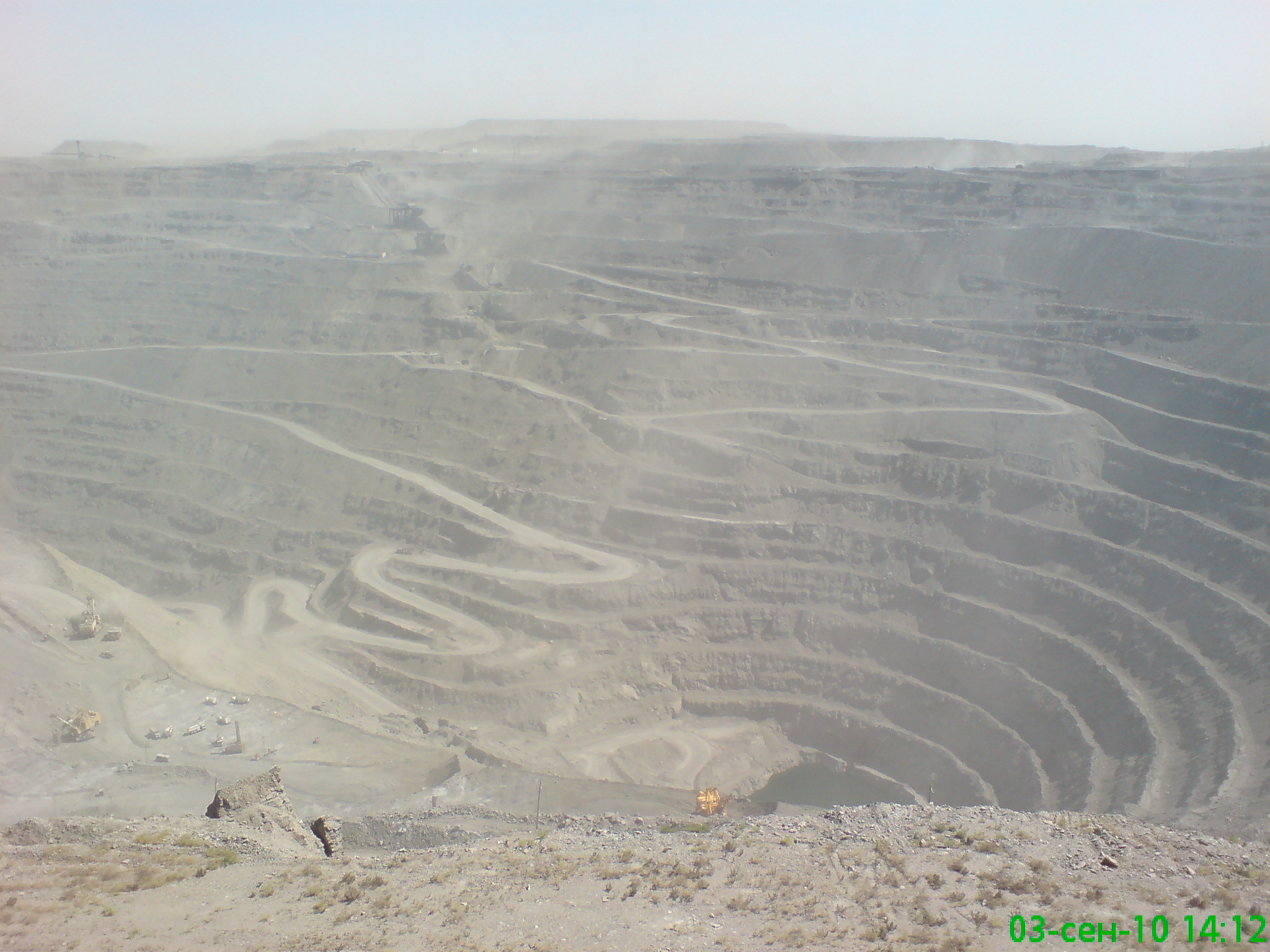
Muruntau mine, 2010

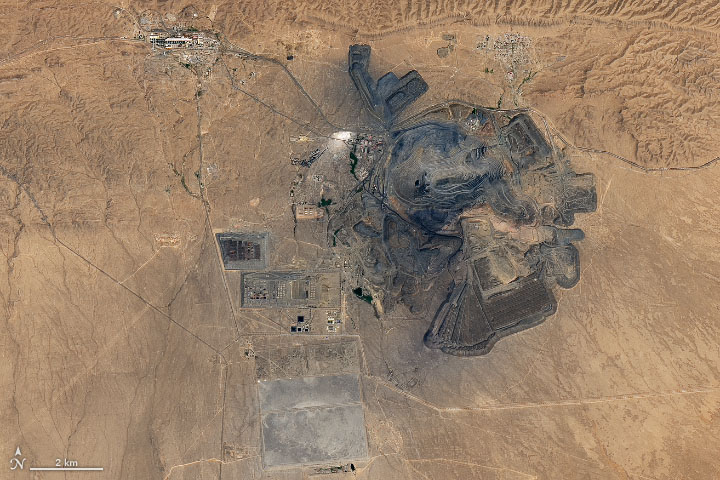
Muruntau mine from space, 2022

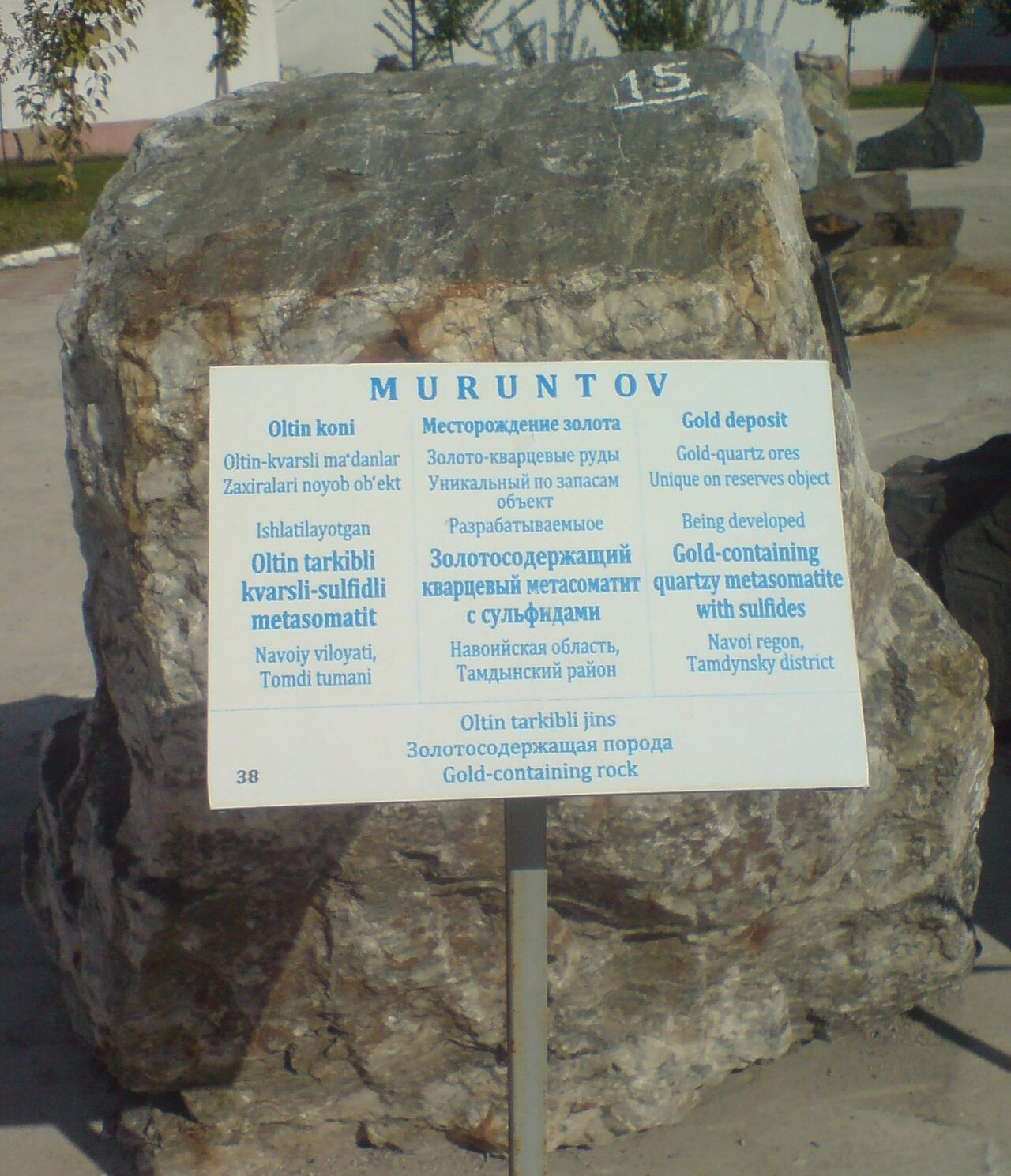
Gold ore from Muruntau, on display at the Museum of Geology, Tashkent

The Muruntau gold deposit is situated in the Qizilqum Desert of Uzbekistan. It is being mined in the world's largest open-pit gold mine with production believed to be of the order of two million ounces per annum (56.7 tonnes). The open pit measures about 3.5 by 2.5 km and extends to a depth of 560m (2012). The gold ore resource in the Muruntau deposit, including production, is about 170 million ounces of gold (4,819 tonnes). This gives the mine a reserves-to-production ratio of 85 years. The mine is owned and operated by Uzbekistan state-owned Navoi Mining and Metallurgical Company.

The giant Muruntau Gold deposit was discovered in 1958. The area was a source of turquoise since the days of the Silk Road. It was not until the 1950s, however, that the Muruntau area was systematically explored. A large gold and arsenic geochemical anomaly, detected during systematic geochemical sampling and geological mapping of the area indicated the Muruntau deposit. Auriferous quartz veins were subsequently found in surface exposures at the site of the current open pit. Mining commenced on the deposit in 1967, and production has been continuous ever since.

== Tectonic setting ==
The Kyzyl Kum area is underlain by three main tectonic units. The oldest, basement, consists of metamorphosed and folded Lower Palaeozoic carbonaceous and sulphidic clastic rock referred to as the Besopan Formation. The Besopan Formation was metamorphosed and deformed during the Lower Palaeozoic Caledonian orogeny. After erosion and exhumation it became basement to an unconformable unit of Devonian to Early Triassic carbonate and clastic sediments and volcanic rocks.

=== Tectonics ===
==== Caledonian (Silurian) deformation ====
The Kyzyl Kum area basement is strongly folded and pelitic rocks have a well-developed axial planar cleavage. Isoclinal folds with east-striking axial planes become overturned to the north. Such isoclinal folding is interpreted to have occurred prior to deposition of the basement, which exhibits open folds with vertical axial planes. Metamorphic grade of the basement does not exceed greenschist facies over much of the region. Rubidium - Strontium dating of metamorphic micas has indicated a Caledonian (Early Devonian) cooling age of 401 ± 11 million years.

==== Late Carboniferous deformation ====
There is evidence of a deformation event during the Hercynian orogeny (late Carboniferous) in this region. North of Muruntau, Devonian and Carboniferous carbonate rocks are thrust over the top of the older basement rocks. Therefore, the age of this thrust is Carboniferous or younger. A thrusting event at this time helps to explain the change at the top of the Carboniferous (in the Karatau Range) from shallow marine to terrestrial.

==== Permo-Triassic deformation ====
A major Permo-Triassic deformation event in the Karatau Range occurs north of Muruntau as well. This event is synchronous with the major unconformity above. The main mechanism of this event is the giant Karatau Fault, which has right-lateral displacement of 150 kilometres (93 mi) and related steeply-plunging Z-shaped folds. Outcrops of the basement throughout the region are elongate in the direction of strike-slip faulting, northwest.

==== Late Mesozoic and Tertiary deformation ====
Open folds which are post-Tertiary in age are superimposed on the Hercynian deformation. These folds occur in Tertiary exposures approximately 50 km to the south-west of the Muruntau deposit. Furthermore, a 70 to 100 kilometres (43 to 62 mi) of right-lateral movement occurred along the Karatau Fault during the late Mesozoic and early Tertiary.
