= Zarafshon =

Zarafshon Zarafshon / Зарафшон
- City
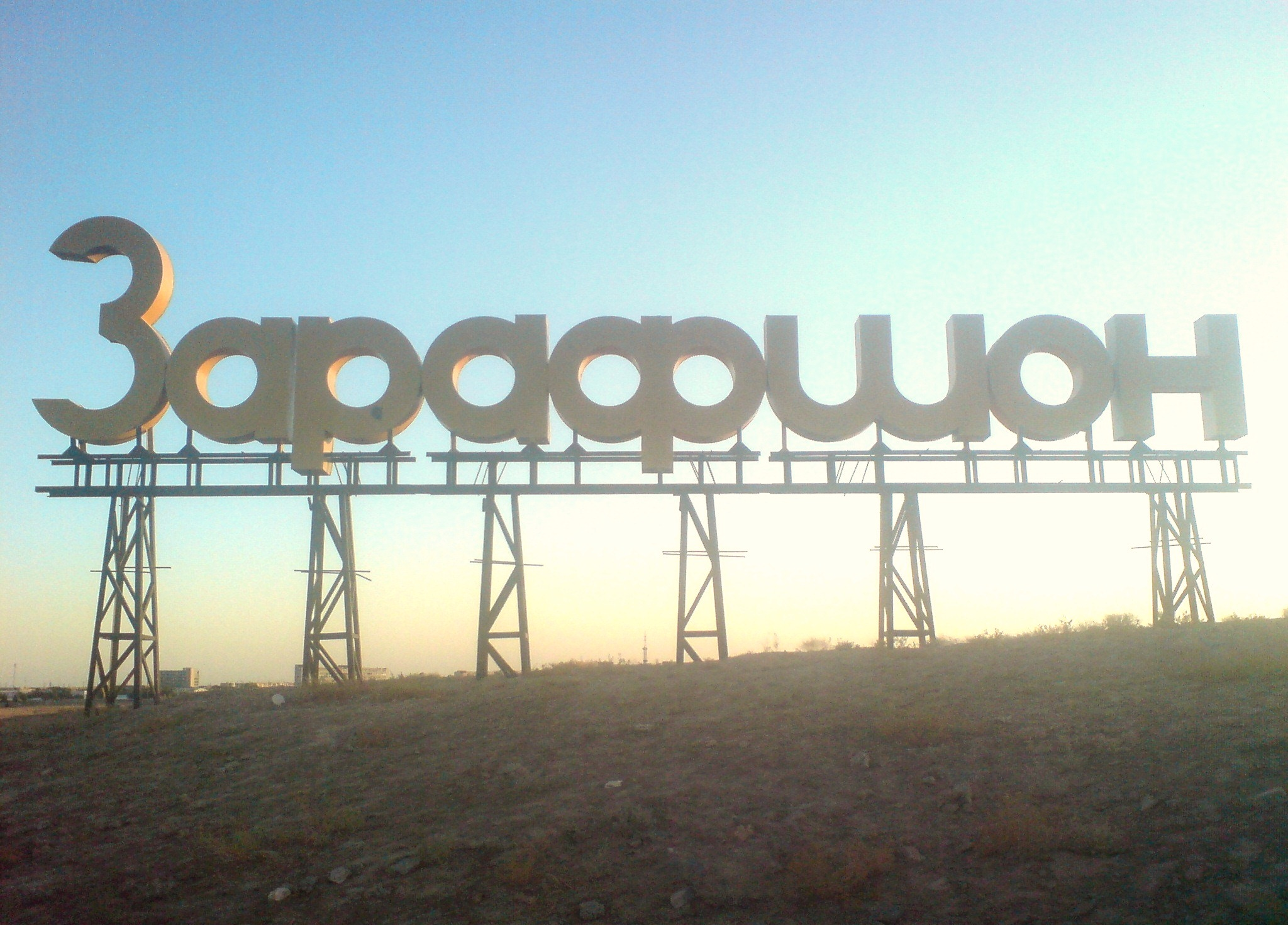
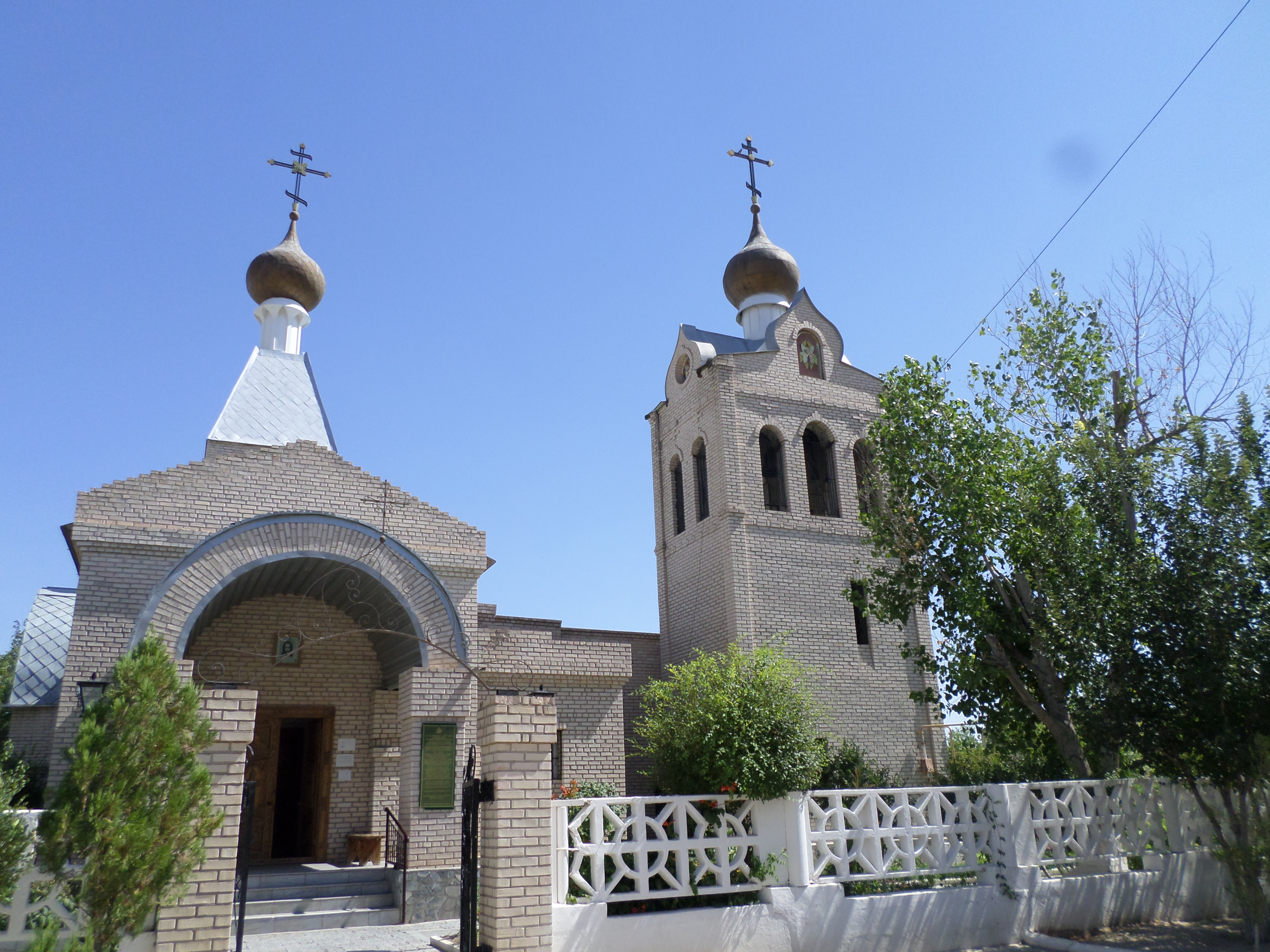
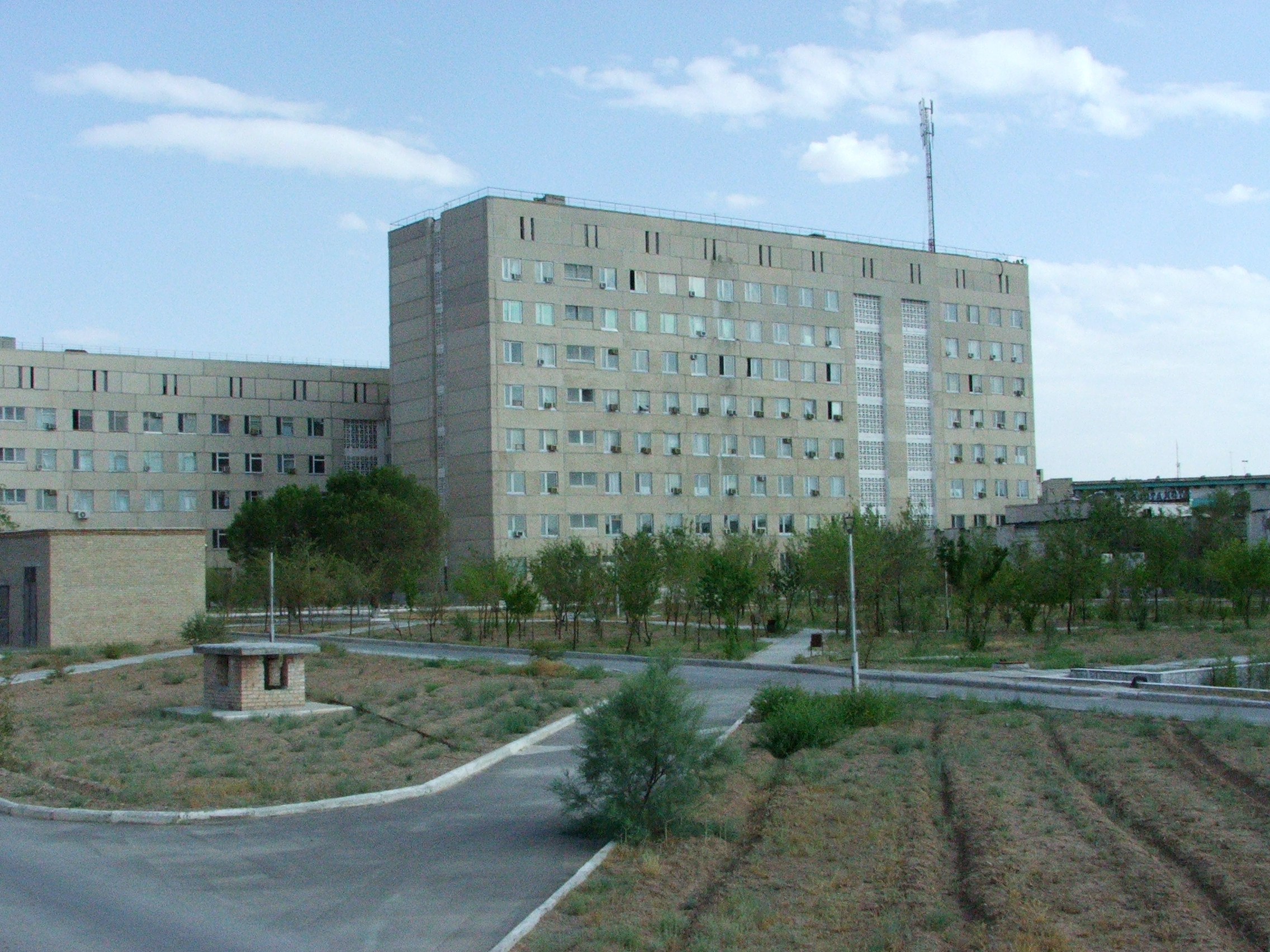
- Zarafshan

- Location in Uzbekistan
- Coordinates: 41°36′29″N 64°13′35″E
- Country: Uzbekistan
- Region: Navoiy Region

Area
  - Total: 20 km^{2} (7.7 sq mi)
- Elevation: 400 m (1,300 ft)

Population (2021)
  - Total: 85,100
  - Density: 4,300/km^{2} (11,000/sq mi)
- Time zone: UTC+05:00 (UZT)
- Postal code: 706801

Zarafshon (Uzbek: Zarafshon / Зарафшон, Persian: زرافشان) is a city in the center of Uzbekistan's Navoiy Region. Administratively, it is a district-level city, that includes the urban-type settlement Muruntau. It has an area of 20 km^{2} (7.7 sq mi) and 85,100 inhabitants (2021).

Zarafshon is called "the gold capital of Uzbekistan". It is home of the Navoi Mining and Metallurgical Company's Central Mining Administration, charged with mining and processing gold from the nearby Muruntau open-pit mine. Between 1995 and 2006, the Muruntau gold mining and processing operation was run by the Zarafshan-Newmont Joint Venture, a foreign direct investment by Newmont Mining Corporation of Denver, Colorado.

Zarafshan Airport (IATA: AFS) is served by Uzbekistan Airlines with direct daily flights to and from Tashkent.

Zarafshon is the sister city of Clinton, Mississippi (USA).

== History ==
The town of Zarafshon had its origins as Zarafshan (Russian: Зарафшан) in the mining of uranium and of gold. (The Uzbek name Zarafshon means "gold-bearing".) Construction of the city began in the early 1960s and continued until the collapse of the USSR, 1965 is considered the official year of the city's foundation. On January 16, 1967, Zarafshon received the status of an urban-type settlement. At the time of the collapse of the USSR in 1991, the city had 12 microdistricts with typical Soviet (3-, 4-, 5-, 7- and 9-story) buildings. There were 8 comprehensive schools and 21 kindergartens in the city.

Initially, the city functioned as the residence of workers servicing industrial facilities for gold mining located at Muruntau Mine and the «Bessopan» industrial site, each a part of the Navoi Mining and Metallurgical Company. Gold production from the Muruntau Mine deposit accounted for approximately 30% of total gold-production in the USSR.

During the Soviet period, the gold mine developed continuously. Workers were recruited from all over the Soviet Union, and only a few left.

Zarafshon became the third industrial city in Navoiy region, after Uchquduq and Navoiy, built due to the establishment of city-forming enterprises (Navoi Mining and Metallurgical Combinat and Navoiyazot) in the region in the late 1950s and early 1960s.

The largest division of Navoi Mining and Metallurgical Combinat is located in the city of Zarafshon, it is the Central Mining Department, which currently includes 29 main and auxiliary divisions. The main task of the Central Mining Department is the development of precious-metal deposits (gold, silver) and their mining.

== Geography ==
The city is situated in the central part of the Kyzylkum Desert, located 30 kilometers away from the largest gold deposit in the republic, "Muruntau". In 2020 it was the largest gold mine in the world

== Industry ==
- The Central Ore Directorate of the State Enterprise "NGMK" (gold and silver mining, non-metallic construction materials).
- "Kyzylkum Phosphorite Complex" LLC, a subsidiary of "Uzkhimprom" (phosphorite concentrate mining).
- Zarafshan Construction Management of the State Enterprise "NGMK" (construction).
- The "Agama" Production and Technological Facility of the State Enterprise "NGMK" (clothing production).

== Infrastructure ==
The city boasts a unique water supply system sourced from the Amu Darya River (with approximately 250 kilometers of pipes under constant control). It includes 12 residential micro-districts with improved architectural planning from the Soviet era, two micro-districts under construction, cultural facilities (cultural centers, creative hubs), sports amenities (stadium, swimming pool, gyms, and sports complexes), commercial areas (shops, markets, shopping centers), healthcare institutions, and various other public facilities. Additionally, the city features artificial vegetation and beautiful parks.

== Sport ==
Zarafshon has been the venue for numerous sports competitions, including the Asian Powerlifting Championship in 2004, an international sailing tournament among CIS countries, and many other events. In 2004 alone, Zarafshon hosted 150 sports events of various levels. Athletes from Zarafshon have excelled in various sports. Swimmers have competed in the Olympic Games, while motocross riders have maintained leadership in national competitions. The powerlifting team has participated in many world championships, achieving significant results and winning top honors.

The sailing team has been involved in numerous international competitions and consistently ranks among the leaders. The football club "FC Qizilqum" has been competing in the Uzbekistan Super League since 2000, with its highest achievement being a 3rd place finish in the 2002 season. The parachuting section was highly popular, but it has ceased to exist. The "Zar-Dan" parachute team has earned many awards, and prizes. In competitions for the CIS Cup, Zarafshon athletes secured a place among the top three.

== Gallery ==
Зарафшанская телебашня

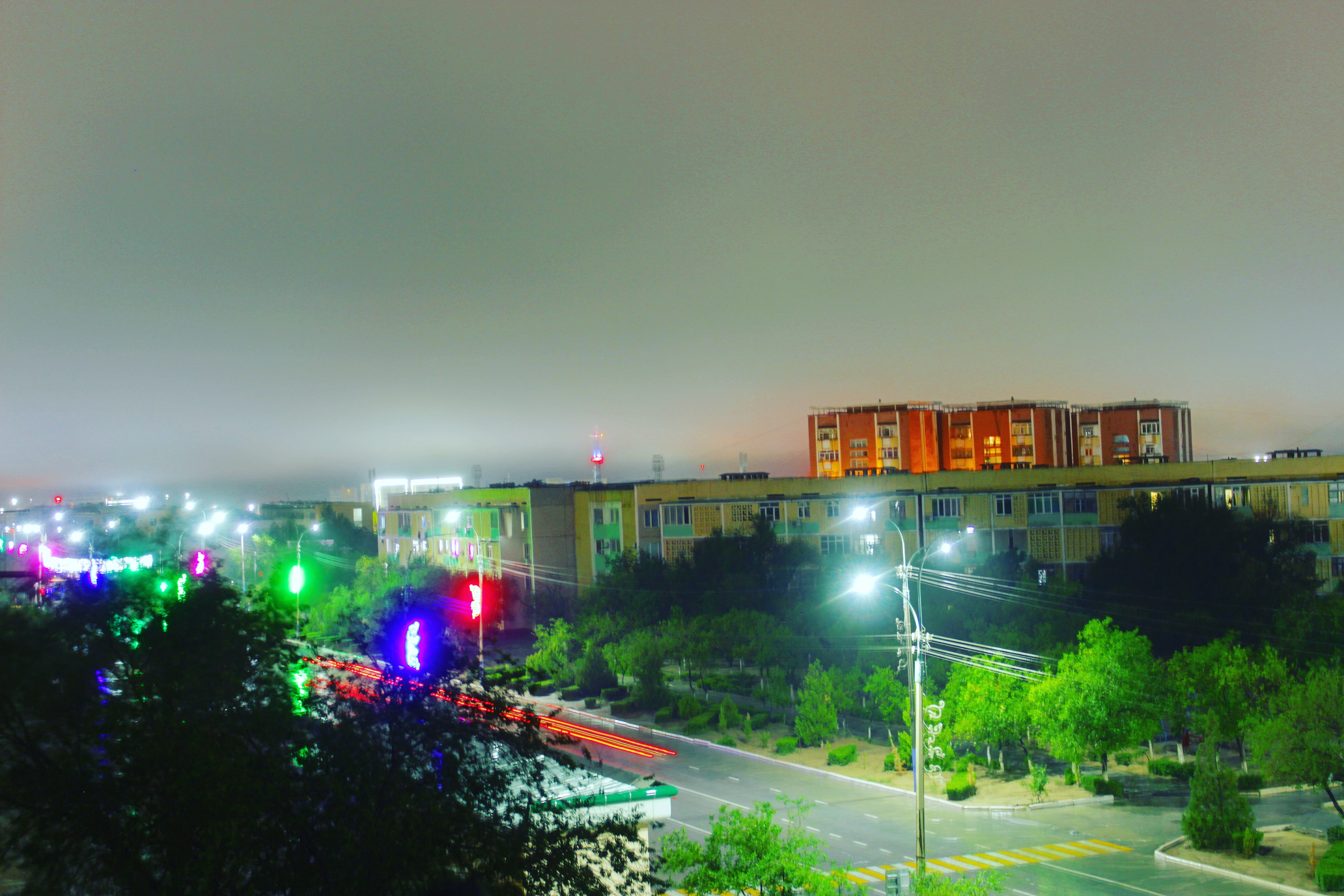
Zarafshon

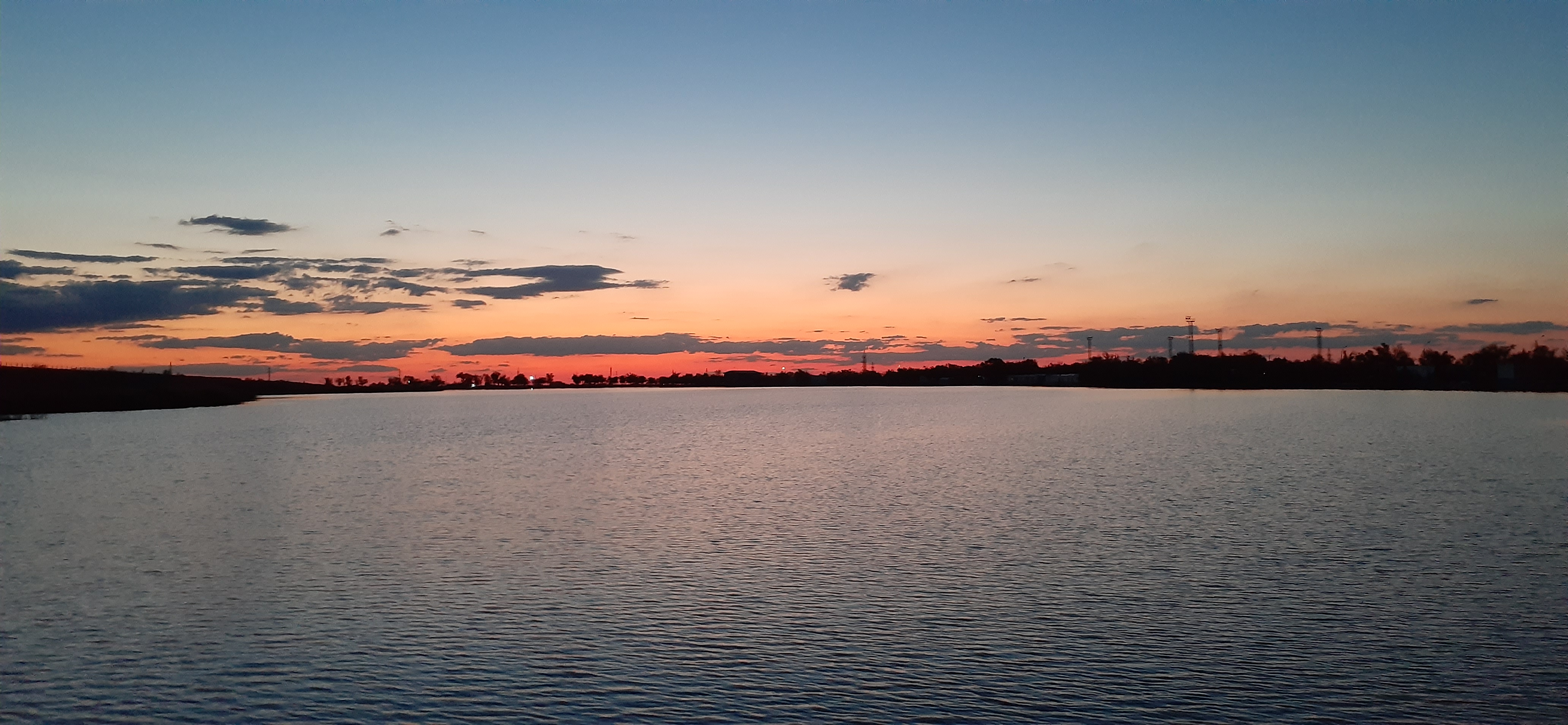
Zarafshan in Ozero Goro

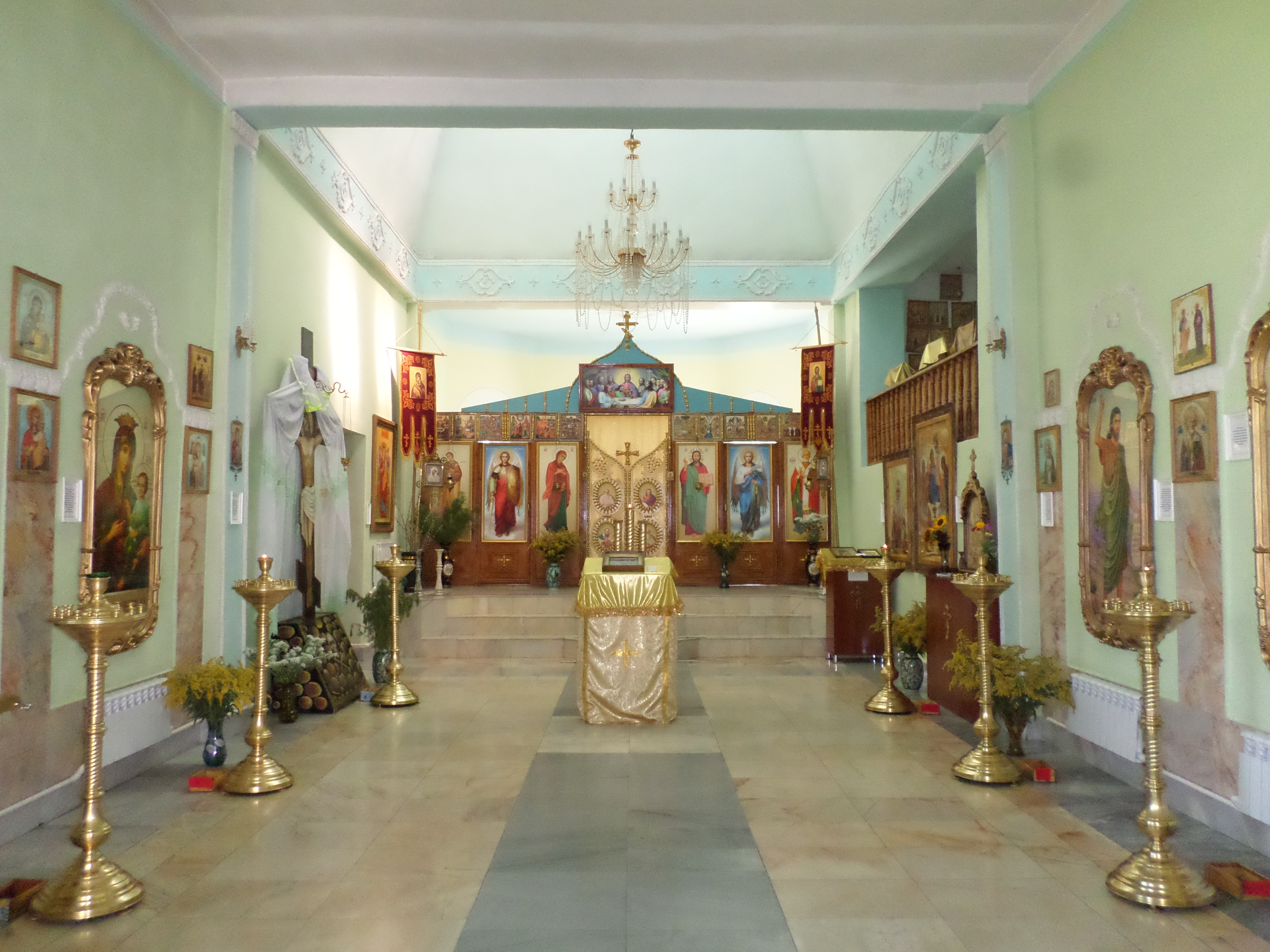
Church in Zarafshon

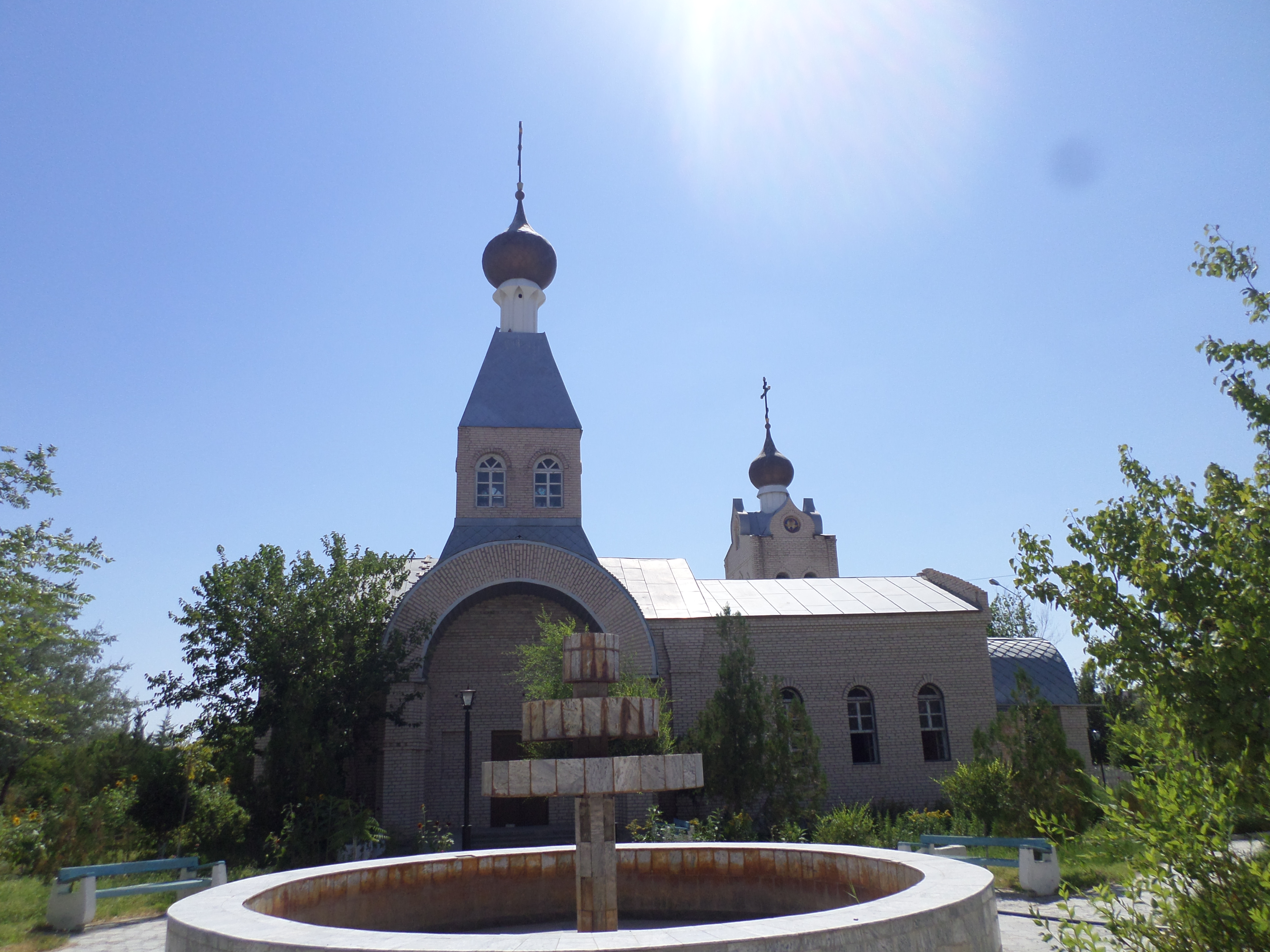
Church in Zarafshon
