= Muruntau mine =

Gold mine in Uzbekistan

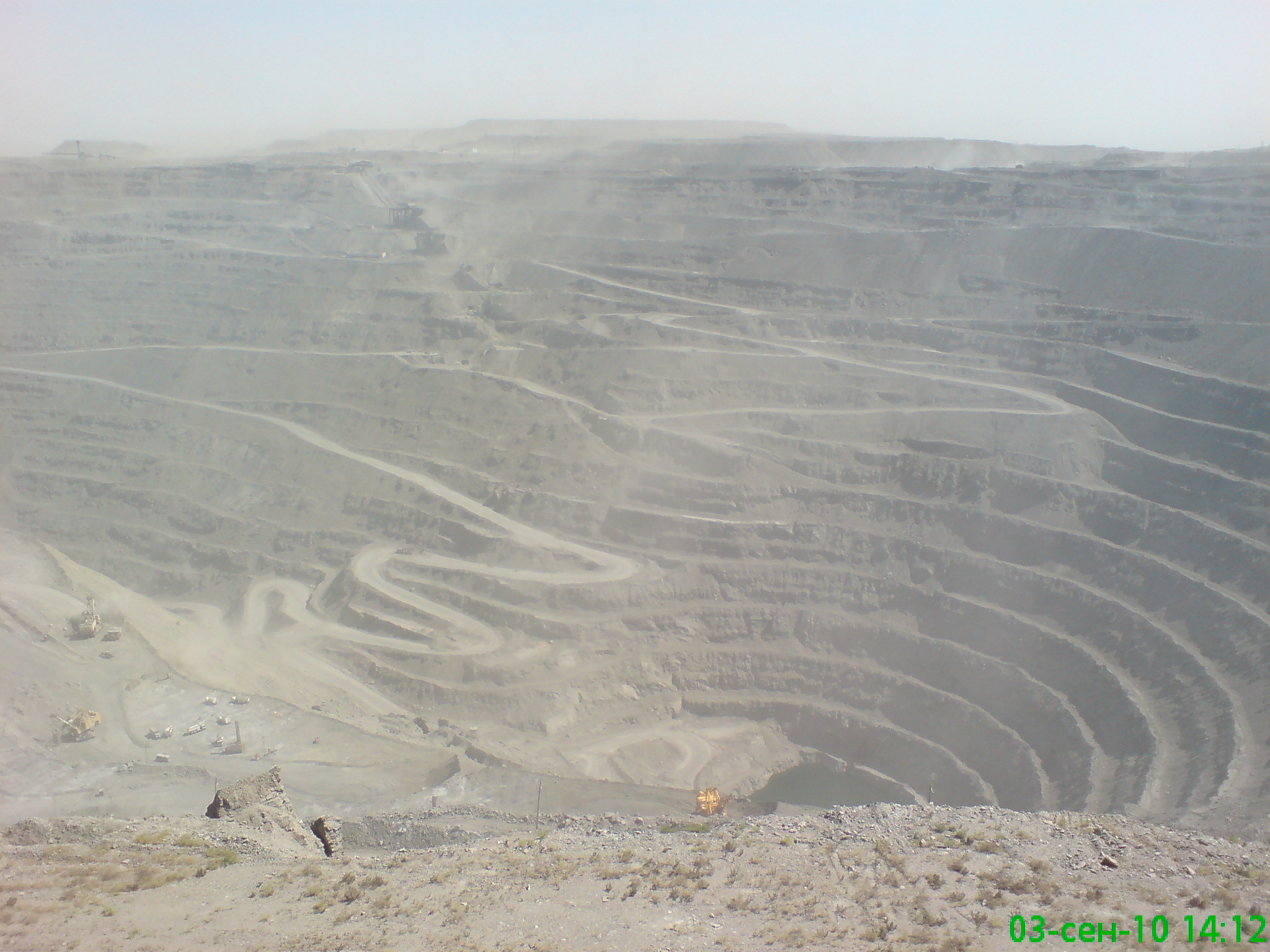
- Interactive map of Muruntau mine
- Location: Navoiy Province, Uzbekistan; 41°29′48″N 64°34′40″E
- Products: Gold

The Muruntau mine (Uzbek: Muruntov koni) is one of the largest gold mines in Uzbekistan and in the world. The mine is located in the mountains of Murintau in the south-west of the Kyzylkum desert, on the territory of the Tamdi district of the Navoi region of Uzbekistan. The mine has estimated reserves of 71,400,000 ounces (2,020 t) of gold.

The field was discovered in 1958, industrial mining process started on July 21, 1969. Navoi Mining and Metallurgical Company is one of the largest Uzbek companies which has control over the mine.

== General information ==
It is the leading deposit of the Zarafshan gold mining complex, which ranks second in terms of gold production (after the Grasberg enterprise in Indonesia). During the mining process, the mine became the largest gold mine in the world (length - 3.5 km, width - 2.7 km, depth - 600 m).

In 2001, production was 53 tons per year and 61 tons in 2014. As of 2007, the residual gold reserves were estimated at 1,750 tons.

== See also ==
- Amantaitau–Daughyztau mine (Navoiy Province), gold and silver
