= 2015–16 Iranian Futsal Super League =

Iranian Futsal Super League
- Season: 2015–16
- Champions: Tasisat Daryaei
- Relegated: Ferdosi Mashhad; Kashi Nilou
- 2016 AFC Futsal Club Championship: Tasisat Daryaei
- Matches: 169
- Goals: 949 (5.62 per match)
- Top goalscorer: Ali Asghar Hassanzadeh (29 goals)
- Biggest home win: Melli Haffari Iran 8 - 1 Misagh
- Biggest away win: Azarakhsh 3 - 9 Giti; Yasin Pishro 2 - 8 Moghavemat
- Highest scoring: Azarakhsh 3 - 9 Giti; Tasisat 7 - 5 Yasin Pishro; Mes 8 - 4 Yasin Pishro; Mansouri 6 - 6 Giti
- Longest winning run: 7 Games; Dabiri (11th week~17th week)
- Longest unbeaten run: 12 Games; Dabiri (11th week~23rd week)
- Longest winless run: 9 Games; Kashi Nilou (4th week~12th week)
- Longest losing run: 8 Games; Kashi Nilou (5th week~12th week); Ferdosi (11th week~18th week)

The 2015–16 Iranian Futsal Super League are the 17th season of the Iran Pro League and the 12th under the name Futsal Super League. Tasisat Daryaei Tehran are the defending champions. The season will feature 12 teams from the 2014–15 Iranian Futsal Super League and two new teams promoted from the 2014–15 Iran Futsal's 1st Division: Azarakhsh Bandar Abbas and Kashi Nilou Isfahan.

== Teams ==
Locations of clubs in 2015–16 Iranian Futsal Super League

=== Stadia, locations and personnel ===
Team	City	Venue	Capacity	Head coach	Team captain	Past Season
Azarakhsh	Sarkhun	Fajr	4,000	(Iran) Abbas Rouzpeykar	–	Promoted
Dabiri	Tabriz	Shahid Pour Sharifi	6,000	(Iran) Javad Asghari Moghaddam	(Iran) Javad Asghari Moghaddam	8th
Farsh Ara	Mashhad	Shahid Beheshti	6,000	(Iran) Majid Mortezaei	(Iran) Ali Abdollahi	7th
Ferdosi	Mashhad	Karegaran	–	(Iran) Mostafa Nemati	–	10th
Giti Pasand	Isfahan	Pirouzi	4,300	(Iran) Reza Lak Aliabadi	–	2nd
Kashi Nilou	Isfahan	Pirouzi	4,300	(Iran) Reza Sadeghi	–	Promoted
Melli Haffari Iran	Ahvaz	Naft	1,000	(Iran) Mohsen Hassanzadeh	–	4th
Mes Sungun	Varzaqan	Shahid Pour Sharifi	6,000	(Iran) Alireza Afzal	–	3rd
Misagh	Tehran	Shahrdari Mantagheh 11	300	(Iran) Mahmoud Khorakchi	(Iran) Hossein Soltani	9th
Moghavemat Alborz	Karaj	Enghelab	2,500	(Iran) Reza Fallahzadeh	–	12th
Shahid Mansouri	Gharchak	7th Tir	3,000	(Iran) Reza Davarzani	(Iran) Hamid Nasiri	5th
Shahrvand	Sari	Sayed Rasoul Hosseini	5,000	(Iran) Mahdi Nemati(unofficial)	(Iran) Mahmoud Lotfi	11th
Tasisat Daryaei	Tehran	Handball Federation	–	(Iran) Vahid Shamsaei	(Iran) Vahid Shamsaei	Champion
Yasin Pishro^{1}	Qom	Shahid Heidarian	2,000	(Iran) Mehdi Ghiasi	(Iran) Saeid Ghasemi	6th

- ^{1} Mahan Tandis Renamed to Atoliyeh Tehran. From 4th Week, Atoliyeh Tehran Renamed to Yasin Pishro.

== Managerial changes ==
=== Before the start of the season ===
Team	Outgoing head coach	Manner of departure	Date of vacancy	Position in table	Incoming head coach	Date of appointment
Mes Sungun	(Iran) Hossein Shams	Contract expired	13 March 2015	Pre-season	(Iran) Alireza Afzal	3 June 2015
Giti Pasand	(Iran) Mohammad Keshavarz	Contract expired	13 March 2015	Pre-season	(Iran) Mahmoud Khorakchi	14 June 2015
Kashi Nilou	(Iran) Alireza Afzal	Contract expired	12 March 2015	Pre-season	(Iran) Reza Sadeghi	15 June 2015
Melli Haffari	(Iran) Mohammad Nazemasharieh	Contract expired	13 March 2015	Pre-season	(Iran) Mohsen Hasanzadeh	17 June 2015
Mahan Tandis	(Iran) Alireza Radi	Contract expired	13 March 2015	Pre-season	(Iran) Mehdi Ghiasi	19 June 2015

=== In season ===
Team	Outgoing head coach	Manner of departure	Date of vacancy	Position in table	Incoming head coach	Date of appointment	Position in table
Giti Pasand	(Iran) Mahmoud Khorakchi	Dismissal	8 October 2015	3	(Iran) Reza Lak Aliabadi	15 October 2015	4
Misagh Tehran	(Iran) Reza Lak Aliabadi	Resigned	14 October 2015	7	(Iran) Mahmoud Khorakchi	19 October 2014	9
Misagh Tehran	(Iran) Mehdi Abtahi	dismissal	13 November 2015	13	(Iran) Mahdi Nemati(unofficial)	19 November 2014	12

== League standings ==
Pos	Team	Pld	W	D	L	GF	GA	GD	Pts	Qualification or relegation
1	Tasisat Daryaei (C)	25	16	4	5	98	58	+40	52	AFC Futsal Club Championship
2	Mes Sungun	25	16	4	5	89	55	+34	52	
3	Giti Pasand	25	15	5	5	94	65	+29	50	
4	Dabiri Tabriz	25	12	6	7	84	70	+14	42	
5	Melli Haffari Iran	25	10	9	6	81	57	+24	39	
6	Yasin Pishro	25	11	4	10	79	77	+2	37	
7	Azarakhsh	25	9	6	10	48	64	−16	33	
8	Shahid Mansouri	25	8	6	11	59	67	−8	30	
9	Misagh Tehran	25	8	6	11	66	84	−18	30	
10	Moghavemat Alborz	25	8	5	12	61	70	−9	29	
11	Farsh Ara	25	7	6	12	62	77	−15	27	
12	Shahrvand Sari	25	8	3	14	55	73	−18	27	
13	Ferdosi (R)	25	6	1	18	49	90	−41	19	Relegation to 1st Division 2016–17
14	Kashi Nilou (R)	13	2	1	10	25	43	−18	7 (Note: Relegation to the 1st Division issued by Iranian Football Federation.)	Relegation to 1st Division 2016–17

Updated to match(es) played on 10 January 2016. Source: Iranian Futsal News Agency
Rules for classification: 1) points; 2) goal difference; 3) number of goals scored.
(C) Champions; (R) Relegated

== Positions by round ==
Team ╲ Round	1	2	3	4	5	6	7	8	9	10	11	12	13	14	15	16	17	18	19	20	21	22	23	24	25	26
Tasisat Daryaei	6	3	1	1	1	1	1	1	1	1	1	1	1	1	1	1	1	2	1	2	1	1	1	2	1	1
Mes Sungun	10	6	5	5	2	5	2	2	2	2	3	2	2	2	2	2	2	3	2	3	2	2	2	1	2	2
Giti Pasand	11	8	3	3	6	3	4	3	3	3	2	3	3	3	4	4	4	1	4	4	4	4	3	3	3	3
Dabiri Tabriz	1	1	4	4	7	4	6	7	4	6	5	5	4	4	3	3	3	4	3	1	3	3	4	4	4	4
Melli Haffari Iran	2	2	2	2	5	7	8	9	7	5	4	4	5	5	5	5	5	5	5	5	5	5	5	6	5	5
Yasin Pishro	5	7	8	7	4	2	3	5	5	8	6	7	6	6	6	6	6	6	6	6	6	6	6	5	6	6
Azarakhsh	13	10	14	14	14	11	13	11	11	11	12	11	11	8	9	10	11	11	11	10	8	7	7	7	8	7
Shahid Mansouri	8	11	12	11	8	9	9	10	12	13	11	9	9	9	8	8	9	10	9	7	9	9	8	9	10	8
Misagh Tehran	4	4	6	6	3	6	5	8	9	10	8	6	7	7	7	7	7	8	8	9	10	10	9	10	7	9
Moghavemat Alborz	7	5	7	9	11	12	10	6	8	9	10	12	12	13	11	9	8	7	7	8	7	8	10	8	9	10
Farsh Ara	3	9	9	13	13	14	12	13	13	12	13	13	13	12	13	11	10	9	10	11	11	12	11	12	11	11
Shahrvand Sari	14	13	11	10	10	8	11	12	10	7	9	10	10	11	12	13	13	13	13	13	13	11	12	11	12	12
Ferdosi	12	14	13	12	9	10	7	4	6	4	7	8	8	10	10	12	12	12	12	12	12	13	13	13	13	13
Kashi Nilou	9	12	10	8	12	13	14	14	14	14	14	14	14	14	14	14	14	14	14	14	14	14	14	14	14	14

Leader / 2016 AFC Futsal Club Championship
Relegation to the 2016–17 Iran Futsal's 1st Division

== Results table ==
Home \ Away	AZA	DAB	ARA	FER	SGP	NIL	HFR	MES	MIS	MOA	MAN	SAR	TST	YAS
Azarakhsh		3–0 (Note: Dabiri received a technical loss of 3-0 to Azarakhsh.)	3–2	4–2	3–9	1–1	1–5	3–2	0–0	1–3	3–0	3–1	1–1	2–1
Dabiri Tabriz	8–3		5–5	7–2	1–2		2–2	4–1	4–3	3–2	1–1	2–1	3–2	3–3
Farsh Ara	3–0 (Note: Azarakhsh received a technical loss of 3-0 to Farsh Ara.)	1–1		3–2	1–6		3–3	2–5	2–0	4–3	5–4	4–4	3–4	1–5
Ferdosi	4–0	1–3	1–4		4–2	3–2	4–4	1–4	3–5	3–6	1–0	4–1	1–2	0–1
Giti Pasand	1–0	3–5	2–1	3–0 (Note: Ferdosi received a technical loss of 3-0 to Giti Pasand.)		4–1	3–3	5–3	5–5	1–3	0–4	2–2	6–2	5–3
Kashi Nilou		3–4	2–4				2–4		4–1	3–2			2–6	2–4
Melli Haffari Iran	0–3	3–2	2–0	7–1	4–4			3–3	8–1	5–0	1–1	3–0	4–4	1–3
Mes Sungun	4–1	3–1	4–1	7–2	4–2	3–0 (Note: Kashi Nilou received a technical loss of 3-0 to Mes Sungun)	2–1		5–1	4–1	2–0	4–1	1–3	8–4
Misagh Tehran	2–1	5–5	4–3	5–4	1–4		4–4	3–4		1–2	2–2	4–1	3–2	2–1
Moghavemat Alborz	3–3	5–4	1–1	0–2	3–4		1–2	2–2	4–1		3–3	1–0	2–7	0–3
Shahid Mansouri	1–2	1–6	3–2	4–2	6–6	5–2	3–2	4–3	3–5	3–3		3–4	2–1	2–1
Shahrvand Sari	2–2	1–5	2–1	6–0	0–4	2–1	3–5	3–4	6–2	6–3	2–1		2–4	3–2
Tasisat Daryaei	6–2	7–1	6–1	6–0	1–5		4–2	4–4	4–4	2–0	3–0 (Note: The game score was 3-1 until the end of first half.)	7–2		7–5
Yasin Pishro	3–3	7–4	5–5	4–2	5–6		3–2	3–3	3–2	2–8	5–3	1–0	2–3	

Updated to match(es) played on 10 January 2016. Source:
Legend: Blue = home team win; Yellow = draw; Red = away team win.

== Clubs season-progress ==
	Win
	Draw
	Lose
	Bye
W/O	Withdrew

Team ╲ Round	1	2	3	4	5	6	7	8	9	10	11	12	13	14	15	16	17	18	19	20	21	22	23	24	25	26
Azarakhsh	L	D	L	D	D	W	L	W	D	D	L	W	L	W	L	L	B	W	L	W	W	W	L	D	W/O	W
Dabiri Tabriz	W	W	L	D	L	W	L	D	W	L	W	W	W	W	W	W	W	D	D	W	D	B	D	L	L	W/O
Farsh Ara	W	L	L	L	L	L	W	D	D	D	L	L	D	W	L	W	D	W	L	B	D	L	W	L	W	L
Ferdosi	L	L	D	W	W	L	W	W	L	W	L	L	L	L	L	L	L	W/O	W	L	B	L	L	L	L	L
Giti Pasand	L	W	W	D	L	W	D	W	W	W	W	L	D	W	B	W	W	W	L	L	W	D	W	W	W	D
Kashi Nilou	L	L	W	D	L	L	L	L	L	W/O	L	L	W	W/O	W/O	W/O	W/O	W/O	W/O	W/O	W/O	W/O	W/O	W/O	W/O	W/O
Melli Haffari Iran	W	W	D	D	L	L	D	D	D	W	W	W	D	L	W	W	L	D	L	W	L	W	D	B	W	D
Mes Sungun	L	W	W	D	W	L	W	W	W	W	L	W	W	D	W	L	W	D	W	L	W	W	B	W	D	W
Misagh Tehran	W	W	L	D	W	L	D	L	L	D	W	W	L	D	L	B	W	L	D	L	L	D	W	L	W	L
Moghavemat Alborz	W	D	L	L	L	D	W	W	L	D	L	L	L	L	W	W	W	D	D	L	W	L	L	W	L	B
Shahid Mansouri	L	L	W	D	W	D	D	L	L	L	W	W	L	D	W	L	L	D	D	W	L	L	W	L	B	W
Shahrvand Sari	L	L	W	D	D	W	L	L	W	W	L	L	D	L	L	L	L	L	B	W	L	W	L	W	L	W
Tasisat Daryaei	W	W	W	D	W	W	W	D	W	L	W	W	W	D	L	W	L	B	W	L	W	W	L	D	W	W
Yasin Pishro	W	L	L	W	W	W	L	L	D	L	W	L	W	B	W	L	D	D	W	W	L	L	W	W	D	L

== Awards ==
Iranian Futsal Super League
2015–16 champions
Tasisat Daryaei
Second title

- Winner: Tasisat Daryaei
- Runners-up: Mes Sungun
- Third-Place: Giti Pasand Isfahan
- Top scorer: (Iran) Ali Asghar Hassanzadeh (Tasisat Daryaei) (29)
- Best Player: (Iran) Hossein Tayyebi (Mes Sungun)
- Best Manager: (Iran) Vahid Shamsaei (Tasisat Daryaei)
- Best Goal Keeper: (Iran) Sepehr Mohammadi (Giti Pasand Isfahan)
- Best Young Player: (Iran) Moslem Oladghobad (Yasin Pishro)
- Best Goal: (Iran) Majid Hajibandeh (Misagh)
- Best Host: Ferdosi Mashhad
- Best Foreign Player: (Brazil) Patrick vieira luz (Mes Sungun)
- Best Team: Tasisat Daryaei
- Fairplay Man: (Iran) Mohammad Taheri (Shahid Mansouri Gharchak)
- Fairplay Team: Azarakhsh
- Best Referee: Mahmoud Nasirlou

== See also ==
- 2015–16 Iran Futsal's 1st Division
- 2016 Iran Futsal's 2nd Division
- 2015–16 Iran Pro League
- 2015–16 Azadegan League
- 2015–16 Iran Football's 2nd Division
- 2015–16 Iran Football's 3rd Division
- 2015–16 Hazfi Cup
- Iranian Super Cup
