= Al Mayadeen FC =

Former Lebanese futsal club in Beirut

Al Mayadeen
- Full name: Al Mayadeen Football Club
- Founded: 2015
- Dissolved: 2017; 9 years ago
- League: Lebanese Futsal League

Al Mayadeen Football Club is a former Lebanese futsal club based in Beirut. Formed in 2015, they represented the Al Mayadeen TV channel in the Lebanon Futsal League. They won the league once, in 2016.

== Honours ==
- Lebanese Futsal League
  - Winners (1): 2015–16
