= Amantaitau–Daughyztau mine =

Gold mine in Navoiy, Uzbekistan

Location
- Location: Navoiy Province, Uzbekistan

Production
- Products: Gold

The Amantaitau–Daughyztau mine is one of the largest gold mines in Uzbekistan and in the world. The mine is located in Navoiy Province. The mine has estimated reserves of 9.71 million oz of gold and 3.74 million oz of silver.
