= Uzbekistan Futsal League =

- Founded: 1996
- Country: Uzbekistan
- Confederation: AFC
- Number of clubs: 12
- Level on pyramid: 1
- International cup: AFC Futsal Club Championship
- Current champions: Olmalik (2015)
- Website: Uzbekistan Futsal League
- Current: 2016 Uzbekistan Futsal League season

The Uzbekistan Futsal League, is the top league for Futsal in Uzbekistan. The winning team obtains the participation right to the AFC Futsal Club Championship.

== Champions ==
=== Men ===
Season	1st place, gold medalist(s)	2nd place, silver medalist(s)	3rd place, bronze medalist(s)
1997	R. Madaminov Khiva		
1998	Turon-S Andijan		
1999	Turon-S Andijan		
2000	Turon-S Andijan		
2001	DJKA Tashkent		
2002	Turon-S Andijan		
2003	Nafis Samarkand		
2004	Jizzax-S Jizzakh		
2005	Ardus Tashkent		
2006	Ardus Tashkent	Stroitel Zarafshan	Jizzax-S Jizzakh
2007	Ardus Tashkent	Stroitel Zarafshan	Stroitel PEM
2008	Uchkuduk		Ardus Tashkent
2009	Stroitel Zarafshan	Ardus Tashkent	
2010	Ardus Tashkent	Bunyodkor Tashkent	Maksam Chirchik
2011	Ardus Tashkent	Bunyodkor Tashkent	Maksam Chirchik
2012	Ardus Tashkent	Lokomotiv Tashkent	Stroitel Zarafshan
2013	Lokomotiv Tashkent	Ardus Tashkent	Maksam Chichik
2014	Lokomotiv Tashkent	Dustlik AIN Karshi	Turon S Jizzakh
2015	Olmalik Tashkent Region	Ardus Tashkent	Nasaf Karshi
2016			

=== Women ===
- 2005: (gold) Sevinch Qarshi
- 2006: (gold) Sevinch Qarshi
- 2007: (gold) Sevinch Qarshi
- 2008: (gold) Sevinch Qarshi (silver) Andijanka Andijan (bronze) Stroitel Zarafshan
- 2009:
- 2010:
- 2011: (gold) Sevinch Qarshi (silver) Olimpia Qarshi (bronze) Andijanka Andijan
