= Sarawut Jaipech =

Thai futsal player

Personal information
- Full name: Sarawut Jaipech
- Date of birth: 29 December 1988 (age 37)
- Place of birth: Samut Songkhram, Thailand
- Height: 1.83 m (6 ft 0 in)
- Position: Defender

Team information
- Current team: Chonburi Bluewave

International career^{‡}
Years	Team	Apps	(Gls)
2011–	Thailand		
Medal record
Thailand national football team
Sea Games
Gold medal – first place	2011 Southeast Asian Games	Futsal
AFF Futsal Championship
Gold medal – first place	AFF Futsal Championship 2012	Futsal
Asian Championship
Silver medal – second place	AFC Futsal Championship 2012	Futsal
- ‡ National team caps and goals as of 13:05, 23 May 2008 (UTC)

Sarawut Jaipech (Thai สราวุธ ใจเพชร), is a Thai futsal Defender, and currently a member of Thailand national futsal team.
