= Navoi Mining and Metallurgical Company =

Uzbek industrial enterprise

Navoi Mining & Metallurgy Company
- Type: Joint-stock company
- ISIN: UZ7057810010
- Industry: Mining
- Founded: 1958
- Headquarters: Navoiy, Navoiy Region, Uzbekistan
- Key people: Kuvondik Sanakulov, Director General
- Products: Gold and silver products
- Revenue: ▲US$7,395 million (2024)
- Operating income: ▲US$3,928 million (2024)
- Net income: ▲US$2,137 million (2024)
- Owner: Ministry of Economy and Finance of the Republic of Uzbekistan (98%); State Assets Management Agency of the Republic of Uzbekistan (2%)
- Number of employees: 46,629 (2023)
- Website: www.ngmk.uz/en/

Navoi Mining and Metallurgical Company (Uzbek: Navoiy kon-metallurgiya kombinati aksiyadorlik jamiyati) is a large Uzbek industrial enterprise. The company's most important gold ore deposits are located in the Kyzylkum Desert.

== History ==
The company was established to mine for uranium, for the Soviet nuclear weapon programme, at the Muruntau mine in the Kyzylkum Desert in 1958. However, in the 1960s and 1970s, it diversified into gold mining at the Muruntau mine.

In 2008, it entered into a contact to supply the South Korean company Korea Electric Power Corporation (KEPCO) with 2,600 tonnes of uranium over the next seven years. and, in 2014, it signed a contract to deliver 2,000 tonnes of uranium concentrates annually to India over the next four years.

In 2022, the company said it was considering issuing Eurobonds in 2022 and then conducting an initial public offering on a major stock exchange.

In accordance with a decision of the Government of Uzbekistan, on 1 January 2022, it was reorganized and split into three divisions: (i) the JSC Navoi Mining and Metallurgical Combine (ii) the state enterprise "Navoiyuran", and (iii) the state institution "Fund of Navoi Mining and Metallurgical Combine".

On 10 September 2026, a vehicle tire explosion occurred during tire-fitting work. Two workers were killed.
